= 2021–22 Vitória S.C. season =

Vitória S.C.
2021–22 season
- Chairman: Miguel Pinto Lisboa
- Manager: Pepa
- Stadium: Estádio D. Afonso Henriques
- Primeira Liga: 6th
- Taça de Portugal: Fourth round
- Taça da Liga: Third round
- Top goalscorer: League: Óscar Estupiñán (15); All: Óscar Estupiñán (16)
Home colours	Away colours	Third colours

The 2021–22 season is the 72nd season in the existence of Vitória S.C. and the club's 15th consecutive season in the top flight of Portuguese football. In addition to the domestic league, Vitória S.C. are participating in this season's edition of the Taça de Portugal and the Taça da Liga.

== Players ==
=== First-team squad ===
As of 31 July 2021

Note: Flags indicate national team as defined under FIFA eligibility rules; some limited exceptions apply. Players may hold more than one non-FIFA nationality.

No.	Pos.	Nation	Player
4	DF	CRO	Toni Borevković
5	DF	POR	Rafa Soares
6	DF	GHA	Abdul Mumin
7	FW	POR	Ricardo Quaresma
8	FW	POR	Rúben Lameiras
9	FW	BRA	Bruno Duarte
10	FW	ENG	Marcus Edwards
11	MF	POR	André André
13	DF	POR	Andre Amaro
14	GK	POR	Bruno Varela
15	MF	GHA	Joseph Amoah
16	FW	POR	Rochinha
17	DF	MLI	Falaye Sacko
19	FW	COL	Óscar Estupiñán
22	MF	POR	Gui Guedes

No.	Pos.	Nation	Player
28	DF	POR	Sílvio
29	GK	CZE	Matouš Trmal
30	MF	GBS	Alfa Semedo
41	MF	CIV	Ibrahima Bamba
44	DF	POR	Jorge Fernandes
60	DF	CIV	Zié Ouattara
61	GK	HUN	Antal Bencze
62	DF	POR	Miguel Magalhães
63	GK	POR	Celton Biai
70	MF	POR	André Almeida
76	MF	POR	Tomás Händel
79	FW	POR	Herculano Nabian
80	MF	POR	Daniel Silva
91	DF	POR	Hélder Sá
98	MF	FRA	Nicolas Janvier

=== Other players under contract ===
Note: Flags indicate national team as defined under FIFA eligibility rules; some limited exceptions apply. Players may hold more than one non-FIFA nationality.

No.	Pos.	Nation	Player
—	FW	GHA	Aziz
—	MF	FRA	Denis-Will Poha
—	MF	POR	Miguel Luís

No.	Pos.	Nation	Player
—	MF	NGR	Mikel Agu
—	DF	BRA	Pedro Henrique

=== Out on loan ===
Note: Flags indicate national team as defined under FIFA eligibility rules; some limited exceptions apply. Players may hold more than one non-FIFA nationality.

No.	Pos.	Nation	Player
—	DF	ENG	Easah Suliman (at Nacional until 30 June 2022)
—	MF	ENG	Jacob Maddox (at Burton Albion until 30 June 2022)
—	GK	BRA	Jhonatan (at Rio Ave until 30 June 2022)

Quaresma - Retirement

== Pre-season and friendlies ==
Win Draw Loss Fixtures

== Competitions ==
=== Overall record ===
Competition	First match	Last match	Starting round	Record							
Competition	First match	Last match	Starting round	Pld	W	D	L	GF	GA	GD	Win %
Primeira Liga	8 August 2021	May 2022	Matchday 1	4	1	2	1	4	1	+3	25.00
Taça de Portugal	16 October 2021		Third round	1	1	0	0	1	0	+1	100.00
Taça da Liga	26 July 2021		First round	2	2	0	0	5	1	+4	100.00
Total				7	4	2	1	10	2	+8	57.14

Last updated: 29 August 2021
Source: Soccerway

=== Primeira Liga ===
==== League table ====
Pos	Team	Pld	W	D	L	GF	GA	GD	Pts	Qualification or relegation
4	Braga	34	19	8	7	52	31	+21	65	Qualification for the Europa League group stage (Note: Since the winners of the 2021–22 Taça de Portugal, Porto, qualified for the Champions League based on league position, the spot awarded to the fourth-placed team (Europa Conference League third qualifying round) was passed to the fifth-placed team, and the spot awarded to the fifth-placed team (Europa Conference League second qualifying round) was passed to the sixth-placed team.)
5	Gil Vicente	34	13	12	9	47	42	+5	51	Qualification for the Europa Conference League third qualifying round
6	Vitória de Guimarães	34	13	9	12	50	41	+9	48	Qualification for the Europa Conference League second qualifying round
7	Santa Clara	34	9	13	12	38	54	−16	40	
8	Famalicão	34	9	12	13	45	51	−6	39 (Note: Head-to-head points: Famalicão 4, Estoril 1.)	

Source: Liga Portugal
Rules for classification: 1) Points; 2) Head-to-head points; 3) Head-to-head goal difference; 4) Head-to-head away goals scored; 5) Goal difference; 6) Matches won; 7) Goals scored; 8) Play-off.

==== Results summary ====
Overall								Home						Away					
Pld	W	D	L	GF	GA	GD	Pts	W	D	L	GF	GA	GD	W	D	L	GF	GA	GD
34	13	9	12	50	41	+9	48	9	3	5	34	20	+14	4	6	7	16	21	−5

Last updated: 15 May 2022.
Source: Liga Portugal

==== Results by round ====
Round	1	2	3	4	5	6	7	8	9	10	11	12	13	14	15	16	17	18	19	20	21	22	23	24	25	26	27	28	29	30	31	32	33	34
Ground	H	A	H	A	H	A	H	A	H	A	H	A	A	H	A	H	A	A	H	A	H	A	H	A	H	A	H	A	H	H	A	H	A	H
Result	L	D	W	D	D	D	L	W	W	L	W	L	W	W	L	D	L	D	W	L	W	L	L	L	W	W	L	W	L	W	D	D	D	W
Position	11	14	9	10	10	10	10	7	7	7	7	7	7	7	7	8	8	8	6	6	6	6	6	6	6	6	6	6	6	6	6	6	6	6

Updated to match(es) played on 15 May 2022. Source: Liga Portugal
A = Away; H = Home; W = Win; D = Draw; L = Loss

==== Matches ====
8 August 2021 1	Vitória de Guimarães	0–1	Portimonense	Guimarães
15:30 WEST (UTC+1)		Report	Beto 86'	Stadium: Estádio D. Afonso Henriques; Attendance: 8,824; Referee: Fábio Melo

13 August 2021 2	Estoril	0–0	Vitória de Guimarães	Estoril
20:15 WEST (UTC+1)		Report		Stadium: Estádio António Coimbra da Mota; Attendance: 876; Referee: João Gonçalves

22 August 2021 3	Vitória de Guimarães	4–0	Vizela	Guimarães
20:30 WEST (UTC+1)	André 70' (pen.); Estupiñán 75'; Edwards 82'; Sacko 90+5' (pen.)	Report		Stadium: Estádio D. Afonso Henriques; Attendance: 8,935; Referee: Hugo Miguel

29 August 2021 4	Braga	0–0	Vitória de Guimarães	Braga
19:00 WEST (UTC+1)		Report		Stadium: Estádio Municipal de Braga; Attendance: 7,590; Referee: Nuno Almeida

12 September 2021 5	Vitória de Guimarães	0–0	Belenenses SAD	Guimarães
20:30 WEST (UTC+1)		Report		Stadium: Estádio D. Afonso Henriques; Attendance: 10,462; Referee: Hélder Malheiro

25 September 2021 7	Vitória de Guimarães	1–3	Benfica	Guimarães
18:00 WEST (UTC+1)	Bruno Duarte 78' (pen.)	Report	Yaremchuk 30', 41'; João Mário 73'; Otamendi (yellow card) 83'	Stadium: Estádio D. Afonso Henriques; Attendance: 14,222; Referee: Luís Godinho

1 October 2021 8	Famalicão	1–2	Vitória de Guimarães	Vila Nova de Famalicão
21:15 WET (UTC+0)	Banza 5'; Pickel (yellow card) 63'; Diogo Figueiras (yellow card) 75'; Ivo Rodrigues (red card) 90+5'	Report	Sacko (yellow card) 26'; Estupiñán 34'; Borevković (yellow card) 38'; Rochinha (yellow card) 42'; Edwards 59'; André André (yellow card) 63'; Bruno Varela (yellow card) 89'	Stadium: Estádio Municipal 22 de Junho; Attendance: 3,429; Referee: (France) Thomas Leonard

22 October 2021 9	Vitória de Guimarães	2–1	Marítimo	Guimarães
20:15 WET (UTC+0)	Estupiñán 76'; Borevković (yellow card) 88'; Rochinha 90+1'	Report	Cláudio Winck (yellow card) 68' (goal) 89'	Stadium: Estádio D. Afonso Henriques; Attendance: 10,458; Referee: (Portugal) André Narciso

30 October 2021 10	Sporting CP	1–0	Vitória de Guimarães	Lisbon
21:15 WEST (UTC+1)	Coates 31'	Report		Stadium: Estádio José Alvalade; Attendance: 21,472; Referee: Rui Costa

6 November 2021 11	Vitória de Guimarães	2–1	Moreirense	Guimarães
20:30 WET (UTC+0)	Edwards 19'; Rochinha (yellow card) 29'; Estupiñán (yellow card) 35'; Bruno Duarte 85'	Report	Camará (yellow card) 42'; Felipe Pires 88'	Stadium: Estádio D. Afonso Henriques; Attendance: 12,396; Referee: (Portugal) Vitor Ferreira

28 November 2021 12	Porto	2–1	Vitória de Guimarães	Porto
20:30 WET (UTC±0)	Díaz 39'; Evanilson 60'	Report	Edwards 36' (pen.)	Stadium: Estádio do Dragão; Attendance: 26,407; Referee: (Portugal) Luis Godinho

4 December 2021 13	Paços de Ferreira	1–2	Vitória de Guimarães	Paços de Ferreira
20:30 WET (UTC±0)	Denílson 34'; Maracás (yellow card) 40'; João Pedro (yellow card) 88'	Report	João Ferreira (yellow card) 4'; Bruno Duarte (yellow card) 40' (goal) 90'; Estupiñán 70'; Borevković (yellow card) 88'; Bruno Varela (yellow card) 90+4'	Stadium: Estádio da Mata Real; Attendance: 1,989; Referee: (Portugal) João Pinheiro

11 December 2021 14	Vitória de Guimarães	5–2	Tondela	Guimarães
18:00 WET (UTC±0)	Tomás Händel (yellow card) 8'; Borevković (yellow card) 14'; Tiago Silva 32' (pen.); Estupiñán 41' (pen.); Mumin (yellow card) 45'; Edwards 62' (pen.) 81'; Rúben Lameiras 88'	Report	João Pedro 18' (pen.); Iker Undabarrena 27'; Tiago Almeida (yellow card) 28'; Eduardo Quaresma (yellow card) 40'; Khacef (yellow card) 45+5'; Neto Borges (yellow card) 57'; Manu Hernando (red card) 61'	Stadium: Estádio D. Afonso Henriques; Attendance: 6,354; Referee: (Portugal) Fábio Melo

17 December 2021 15	Santa Clara	1–0	Vitória de Guimarães	Ponta Delgada
19:00 WET (UTC±0)	Paulo Henrique (yellow card) 9'; Rui Costa 40'; Anderson Carvalho (yellow card) 90+1'	Report	Tomás Händel (yellow card) 55'; Estupiñán (yellow card) 75'; Rúben Lameiras (yellow card) 90+3'	Stadium: Estádio de São Miguel; Attendance: 636; Referee: (Portugal) Hugo Silva

29 December 2021 16	Vitória de Guimarães	1–1	Boavista	Guimarães
19:00 WET (UTC±0)	Janvier (yellow card) 18'; Estupiñán (yellow card) 54' (goal) 81'; Tiago Silva (yellow card) 71'; André André (yellow card) 75'; Mumin (yellow card) 88'; Rochinha (yellow card) 90+5'	Report	Abascal (yellow card) 45+2'; Cannon (yellow card) 49'; Tiago Ilori 85'	Stadium: Estádio D. Afonso Henriques; Attendance: 6,835; Referee: (Portugal) Rui Costa

10 January 2022 17	Gil Vicente	3–2	Vitória de Guimarães	Barcelos
20:15 WET (UTC±0)	Fran Navarro 21' (yellow card) 32' (goal) 53'; Leautey 75'; Frelih (yellow card) 86'	Report	André André (yellow card) 25'; Tiago Silva (yellow card) 32'; Edwards (yellow card) 63' (yellow-red card) 90' (goal) 87' (pen.); Borevković (yellow card) 72'; Nelson da Luz 79'	Stadium: Estádio Cidade de Barcelos; Attendance: 2,348; Referee: (Portugal) Manuel Oliveira

17 January 2022 18	Portimonense	1–1	Vitória de Guimarães	Portimão
20:15 WET (UTC±0)	Moufi (yellow card) 48'; Anderson Oliveira (yellow card) 54' (goal) 85'; Lucas Possignolo (yellow card) 65'; Carlinhos (yellow card) 90+5'	Report	Nelson da Luz 34'; Hélder Sá (yellow card) 43'; João Ferreira (yellow card) 45+1'; Rochinha (yellow card) 54'; André Amaro (yellow card) 76'; Rúben Lameiras (yellow card) 83'	Stadium: Estádio Municipal de Portimão; Attendance: 729; Referee: (Portugal) Hugo Miguel

23 January 2022 19	Vitória de Guimarães	3–1	Estoril	Guimarães
15:30 WET (UTC±0)	Borevković (yellow card) 43'; Rochinha 61'; Rafa Soares (yellow card) 63'; Estupiñán 69' 90+3'; Trmal (yellow card) 79'; Bruno Duarte (yellow card) 90+2'	Report	Ferraresi (yellow card) 25'; André Franco 29'; Thiago (yellow card) 53'; Gamboa (yellow card) 60'	Stadium: Estádio D. Afonso Henriques; Attendance: 7,745; Referee: (Portugal) Artur Soares Dias

30 January 2022 20	Vizela	3–2	Vitória de Guimarães	Caldas de Vizela
15:30 WET (UTC±0)	Raphael Guzzo 33' (yellow card) 35'; Cassiano 54'; Aidara 60'; Kouao (yellow card) 73'; Mendez (yellow card) 90+2'	Report	Rochinha 21'; Mumin (yellow card) 36'; João Ferreira (yellow card) 59'; Alfa Semedo (yellow card) 74'; Bruno Duarte 83'	Stadium: Estádio do FC Vizela; Attendance: 4,108; Referee: (Portugal) Miguel Nogueira

5 February 2022 21	Vitória de Guimarães	2–1	Braga	Guimarães
20:30 WET (UTC±0)	Estupiñán 18'; Da Luz 90'	Report	V. Oliveira 48'	Stadium: Estádio D. Afonso Henriques; Attendance: 15,322; Referee: (Portugal) António Nobre

13 February 2022 22	Belenenses	1–0	Vitória de Guimarães	Oeiras
18:00 WET (UTC±0)	Carraça (yellow card) 34'; Alisson Safira 50'; Luiz Felipe (yellow card) 79'; Luković (yellow card) 83'; Pedro Nuno (yellow card) 88'; Akas (yellow card) 90'	Report	Borevković (yellow card) 9'; Tomás Händel (yellow card) 20'; Nelson da Luz (yellow card) 90+2'; Ricardo Quaresma (yellow card) 90+3'	Stadium: Estádio Nacional; Attendance: 1,089; Referee: (Portugal) Rui Costa

19 February 2022 23	Vitória de Guimarães	1–3	Arouca	Guimarães
20:30 WEST (UTC+1)	Estupiñán 26'; Nelson (yellow card) 67'; Quaresma (yellow card) 79'; Janvier (yellow card) 86'; Fernandes (yellow card) 88'	Report	Basso 13'; Kouassi (yellow card) 28'; Antony 35'; Bukia 41'; Galović (yellow card) 49'; Simão (yellow card) 70'; Leandro Silva (yellow card) 89'	Stadium: Estádio D. Afonso Henriques; Attendance: 8,865; Referee: (Portugal) Artur Soares Dias

27 February 2022 24	Benfica	3–0	Vitória de Guimarães	Lisbon
18:00 WEST (UTC+1)	Gonçalo Ramos 23'; Everton (yellow card) 35'; Núñez 37' 52' (pen.)	Report	Alfa Semedo (yellow card) 3'; Mumin (yellow card) 55'	Stadium: Estádio da Luz; Attendance: 39,846; Referee: (Portugal) André Narciso

6 March 2022 25	Vitória de Guimarães	2–1	Famalicão	Guimarães
20:30 WEST (UTC+1)	Tiago Silva (yellow card) 4'; Alfa Semedo (yellow card) 34'; Estupiñán 45+1'; Rochinha 47'; Rúben Lameiras (yellow card) 65'; Rafa Soares (yellow card) 74'; André Almeida (yellow card) 88'	Report	Pêpê Rodrigues 6'; Batubinsika (yellow card) 37'; Heriberto Tavares (yellow card) 90+3'	Stadium: Estádio D. Afonso Henriques; Attendance: 9,659; Referee: (Portugal) Luís Godinho

13 March 2022 26	Marítimo	0–1	Vitória de Guimarães	Funchal
15:30 WEST (UTC+1)	Edgar Costa (yellow card) 58'; Beltrame (yellow card) 61'	Report	Tiago Silva (yellow card) 58'; Miguel Maga (yellow card) 72'; Janvier 82'; Ricardo Quaresma (yellow card) 89'	Stadium: Estádio do Marítimo; Attendance: 6,727; Referee: (Portugal) Hugo Silva

19 March 2022 27	Vitória de Guimarães	1–3	Sporting Lisbon	Guimarães
20:30 WEST (UTC+1)	Estupiñán 23'; Jorge Fernandes (yellow card) 26'; Mumin (yellow card) 27'; Tiago Silva (yellow card) 39'; Bruno Varela (yellow card) 45'	Report	Pablo Sarabia 45+1' (pen.); Nuno Santos (yellow card) 51'; Ricardo Esgaio (yellow card) 54'; Paulinho 70'; Edwards 90+8'	Stadium: Estádio D. Afonso Henriques; Attendance: 16,122; Referee: (Portugal) Fábio Veríssimo

3 April 2022 28	Moreirense	0–1	Vitória de Guimarães	Moreira de Cónegos
18:00 WEST (UTC+1)	Yan (yellow card) 45+3'; Fábio Pacheco (yellow card) 90+5'	Report	Estupiñán (yellow card) 23'; Alfa Semedo (yellow card) 36'; Rochinha (yellow card) 45+2' (goal) 62'; Bamba (yellow card) 88'; Tiago Silva (yellow card) 90+4'	Stadium: Parque Joaquim de Almeida Freitas; Attendance: 3,486; Referee: (Portugal) Gustavo Correia

10 April 2022 29	Vitória de Guimarães	0–1	Porto	Guimarães
18:00 WEST (UTC+1)	Estupiñán (yellow card) 12' (yellow-red card) 81'; Janvier (yellow card) 74'; Luís Esteves (yellow card) 88'; Rochinha (yellow card) 90+8'; Bruno Duarte (yellow card) 90+8'	Report	Otávio (yellow card) 30'; Taremi 36' (pen.); Diogo Costa (yellow card) 90+2'	Stadium: Estádio D. Afonso Henriques; Attendance: 19,232; Referee: (Portugal) João Pinheiro

=== Taça de Portugal ===
16 October 2021 Third round	Oliveira do Hospital	0–1	Vitória de Guimarães	Oliveira do Hospital
11:00 WEST (UTC+1)		Report	Edwards 16'	Stadium: Estádio Municipal de Oliveira do Hospital; Referee: Vitor Ferreira

21 November 2021 Fourth round	Moreirense	3–2	Vitória de Guimarães	Moreira de Cónegos
16:45 WET (UTC±0)	Yan 20', 45'; Vitória 60'	Report	Soares 89', 90+3'	Stadium: Parque Moreira de Cónegos; Referee: Rui Costa

=== Taça da Liga ===
26 July 2021 First round	Vitória de Guimarães	4–1	Leixões	Guimarães
20:15 WEST (UTC+1)	Rochinha 34'; Gomes 74' (o.g.); Duarte 84'; Magalhães 90+4'	Report	Sapara 21' (o.g.)	Stadium: Estádio D. Afonso Henriques; Attendance: 0 Referee: Hélder Malheiro

1 August 2021 Second round	Casa Pia	0–1	Vitória de Guimarães	Lisbon
18:00 WEST (UTC+1)		Report	Duarte 26'	Stadium: Estádio Pina Manique; Attendance: 266; Referee: Cláudio Pereira

27 October 2021 Third round	Vitória de Guimarães	3–3	Benfica	Guimarães
19:30 WEST (UTC+1)	André 21'; Estupiñán 45+2'; Bruno Duarte 82'; Janvier (yellow card) 86'	Report	Semedo 8' (o.g.); Pizzi 15'; João Mário (yellow card) 27'; Radonjić 28'; Veríssimo (yellow card) 37'	Stadium: Estádio D. Afonso Henriques; Attendance: 11,065; Referee: Hugo Miguel

== Appearances and goals ==
As of 14 September 2021

No.	Pos	Nat	Player	Total		Primeira Liga		Taça de Portugal		Taça da Liga	
No.	Pos	Nat	Player	Apps	Goals	Apps	Goals	Apps	Goals	Apps	Goals
Goalkeepers
14	GK	(Portugal) POR	Bruno Varela	2	0	1	0	0	0	1	0
29	GK	(Czech Republic) CZE	Matouš Trmal	9	0	7	0	0	0	2	0
61	GK	(Hungary) HUN	Antal Bencze	0	0	0	0	0	0	0	0
63	GK	(Portugal) POR	Celton Biai	0	0	0	0	0	0	0	0
Defenders
4	DF	(Croatia) CRO	Toni Borevković	10	0	7	0	0	0	3	0
5	DF	(Portugal) POR	Rafa Soares	10	0	8	0	0	0	2	0
6	DF	(Ghana) GHA	Abdul Mumin	6	0	6	0	0	0	0	0
13	DF	(Portugal) POR	André Amaro	1	0	0	0	0	0	1	0
17	DF	(Mali) MLI	Falaye Sacko	10	1	8	1	0	0	2	0
23	DF	(Portugal) POR	João Ferreira	2	0	0+1	0	0	0	1	0
28	DF	(Portugal) POR	Sílvio	1	0	0	0	0	0	0+1	0
44	DF	(Portugal) POR	Jorge Fernandes	6	0	3+1	0	0	0	2	0
60	DF	(Ivory Coast) CIV	Zié Ouattara	0	0	0	0	0	0	0	0
62	DF	(Portugal) POR	Miguel Magalhães	1	1	0	0	0	0	0+1	1
91	DF	(Portugal) POR	Hélder Sá	1	0	0	0	0	0	1	0
Midfielders
11	MF	(Portugal) POR	André André	11	1	8	1	0	0	2+1	0
15	MF	(Ghana) GHA	Joseph Amoah	0	0	0	0	0	0	0	0
22	MF	(Portugal) POR	Gui Guedes	4	0	0+1	0	0	0	1+2	0
24	MF	(Nigeria) NGR	Mikel Agu	0	0	0	0	0	0	0	0
30	MF	(Guinea-Bissau) GBS	Alfa Semedo	7	0	4+1	0	0	0	1+1	0
36	MF	(France) FRA	Denis-Will Poha	0	0	0	0	0	0	0	0
41	DF	(Ivory Coast) CIV	Ibrahima Bamba	0	0	0	0	0	0	0	0
70	MF	(Portugal) POR	André Almeida	11	0	4+4	0	0	0	3	0
76	MF	(Portugal) POR	Tomás Händel	6	0	4	0	0	0	2	0
88	MF	(Portugal) POR	Tiago Silva	7	1	4+3	1	0	0	0	0
98	MF	(France) FRA	Nicolas Janvier	10	2	0+7	0	0	0	1+2	2
Forwards
7	FW	(Portugal) POR	Ricardo Quaresma	8	1	7+1	1	0	0	0	0
8	FW	(Portugal) POR	Rúben Lameiras	8	0	0+6	0	0	0	1+1	0
9	FW	(Brazil) BRA	Bruno	10	3	2+5	1	0	0	2+1	2
10	FW	(England) ENG	Marcus Edwards	11	2	6+2	2	0	0	2+1	0
16	FW	(Portugal) POR	Rochinha	8	1	3+2	0	0	0	3	1
19	FW	(Colombia) COL	Óscar Estupiñán	9	2	6	2	0	0	1+2	0
79	FW	(Portugal) POR	Herculano Nabian	4	0	0+3	0	0	0	0+1	0
