= 2022–23 Vitória S.C. season =

Vitória S.C.
2022–23 season
- Chairman: António Miguel Cardoso
- Manager: Moreno
- Stadium: Estádio D. Afonso Henriques
- Primeira Liga: 6th
- Taça de Portugal: Fifth round
- Taça da Liga: Group stage
- UEFA Europa Conference League: Third qualifying round
Home colours	Away colours	Third colours

The 2022–23 season was the 100th season in the history of Vitória S.C. and their 16th consecutive season in the top flight. The club participated in the Primeira Liga, the Taça de Portugal, the Taça da Liga and the UEFA Europa Conference League.

== Players ==
As of 31 January 2023

Note: Flags indicate national team as defined under FIFA eligibility rules; some limited exceptions apply. Players may hold more than one non-FIFA nationality.

No.	Pos.	Nation	Player
2	DF	POR	Miguel Maga
3	DF	VEN	Mikel Villanueva
5	DF	POR	Hélder Sá
7	MF	POR	Rúben Lameiras
8	MF	POR	Tomás Händel
9	FW	BRA	Safira
10	MF	POR	Tiago Silva
11	FW	POR	Jota Silva
13	DF	POR	André Amaro
14	GK	POR	Bruno Varela
17	FW	BRA	André Silva
20	FW	ANG	Nelson da Luz
21	MF	POR	André André
22	MF	ITA	Ibrahima Bamba
23	MF	BRA	Índio

No.	Pos.	Nation	Player
25	DF	JPN	Ryoya Ogawa (on loan from FC Tokyo)
28	MF	POR	Zé Carlos (on loan from Varzim)
33	FW	BRA	Anderson Silva
44	DF	POR	Jorge Fernandes
47	FW	FRA	Jason Bahamboula
63	GK	POR	Celton Biai
64	MF	POR	Gonçalo Nogueira
72	DF	POR	Afonso Freitas
76	DF	ANG	Bruno Gaspar
80	MF	POR	Dani Silva
83	DF	FRA	Mamadou Tounkara
90	MF	SCO	Mikey Johnston (on loan from Celtic)
98	MF	FRA	Nicolas Janvier
—	MF	POR	Manu Silva

=== Out on loan ===
Note: Flags indicate national team as defined under FIFA eligibility rules; some limited exceptions apply. Players may hold more than one non-FIFA nationality.

No.	Pos.	Nation	Player
—	GK	CZE	Matouš Trmal (at Marítimo until 30 June 2023)
—	DF	CRO	Toni Borevković (at Hajduk Split until 30 June 2023)
—	DF	MLI	Falaye Sacko (at Montpellier until 30 June 2023)

No.	Pos.	Nation	Player
—	DF	ENG	Easah Suliman (at Nacional until 30 June 2023)
—	FW	POR	Herculano Nabian (at Empoli until 30 June 2023)

== Pre-season and friendlies ==
Win Draw Loss

25 June 2022 Friendly	Vitória de Guimarães (Portugal)	1–1	(Portugal) Seleção AF Braga	TBD
--:--WEST (UTC+1)

30 June 2022 Friendly	Vitória de Guimarães (Portugal)	5–1	(Portugal) São Lourenço do Douro	TBD
--:-- WEST (UTC+1)

6 July 2022 Friendly	Vitória de Guimarães (Portugal)	4–0	(Portugal) Trofense	TBD
18:00 WEST (UTC+1)

13 July 2022 Friendly	Vitória de Guimarães (Portugal)	1–0	(Portugal) Torreense	Guimarães
08:00 WEST (UTC+1)				Stadium: Estádio D. Afonso Henriques

16 July 2022 Friendly	Porto (Portugal)	2–1	(Portugal) Vitória de Guimarães	Vila Nova de Gaia
--:-- WEST (UTC+1)				Stadium: Centro de Treinos e Formação Desportiva PortoGaia

== Competitions ==
=== Overall record ===
Competition	First match	Last match	Starting round	Final position	Record							
Competition	First match	Last match	Starting round	Final position	Pld	W	D	L	GF	GA	GD	Win %
Primeira Liga	7 August 2022	27 May 2023	Matchday 1	6th	34	16	5	13	34	39	−5	47.06
Taça de Portugal	15 October 022	11 January 2023	Third round	Fifth round	3	2	0	1	7	5	+2	66.67
Taça da Liga	19 November 2022	12 December 2022	Group stage	Group stage	3	0	3	0	2	2	+0	0.00
UEFA Europa Conference League	21 July 2022	10 August 2022	Second qualifying round	Third qualifying round	4	2	1	1	5	3	+2	50.00
Total					44	20	9	15	48	49	−1	45.45

Last updated: 31 October 2022
Source: Soccerway

=== Primeira Liga ===
==== League table ====
Pos	Team	Pld	W	D	L	GF	GA	GD	Pts	Qualification or relegation
4	Sporting CP	34	23	5	6	71	32	+39	74	Qualification for the Europa League group stage
5	Arouca	34	15	9	10	36	37	−1	54	Qualification for the Europa Conference League third qualifying round
6	Vitória de Guimarães	34	16	5	13	34	39	−5	53	Qualification for the Europa Conference League second qualifying round
7	Chaves	34	12	10	12	35	40	−5	46	
8	Famalicão	34	13	5	16	39	47	−8	44	

Source: Liga Portugal
Rules for classification: 1) Points; 2) Head-to-head points; 3) Head-to-head goal difference; 4) Goal difference; 5) Matches won; 6) Goals scored; 7) Play-off.

==== Results summary ====
Overall								Home						Away					
Pld	W	D	L	GF	GA	GD	Pts	W	D	L	GF	GA	GD	W	D	L	GF	GA	GD
34	16	5	13	34	39	−5	53	10	3	4	18	12	+6	6	2	9	16	27	−11

Last updated: 27 May 2023.
Source: Liga Portugal

==== Results by round ====
Round	1	2	3	4	5	6	7	8	9	10	11	12	13	14	15	16	17	18	19	20	21	22	23	24	25	26	27	28	29	30	31	32	33	34
Ground	A	H	A	H	A	H	A	H	A	H	H	A	H	A	H	A	H	H	A	H	A	H	A	H	A	H	A	A	H	A	H	A	H	A
Result	W	W	L	L	L	W	D	D	W	W	W	L	W	L	D	L	L	W	W	W	D	W	W	L	L	D	L	L	L	W	W	W	W	L
Position	4	4	6	8	11	9	9	9	9	6	4	6	6	6	6	6	7	6	6	5	5	5	5	5	5	5	5	6	6	5	5	5	5	5

Updated to match(es) played on 27 May 2023. Source: Liga Portugal
A = Away; H = Home; W = Win; D = Draw; L = Loss

==== Matches ====
The league fixtures were announced on 5 July 2022.

7 August 2022 1	Chaves	0–1	Vitória de Guimarães	Chaves
20:30 WEST (UTC+1)		Report	Silva 45+3'	Stadium: Estádio Municipal Eng. Manuel Branco Teixeira; Attendance: 7,526; Referee: Manuel Oliveira

14 August 2022 2	Vitória de Guimarães	1–0	Estoril	Guimarães
20:30 WEST (UTC+1)	Silva 16'	Report		Stadium: Estádio D. Afonso Henriques; Attendance: 15,652; Referee: Claúdio Pereira

21 August 2022 3	Portimonense	2–1	Vitória de Guimarães	Portimão
20:30 WEST (UTC+1)	Welinton Jr. 62'; Cariello 88'	Report	Jota 46'	Stadium: Estádio Municipal de Portimão; Attendance: 3,032; Referee: Ricardo Baixinho

29 August 2022 4	Vitória de Guimarães	0–1	Casa Pia	Guimarães
19:00 WEST (UTC+1)		Report	Kunimoto 7'	Stadium: Estádio D. Afonso Henriques; Attendance: 14,231; Referee: Hélder Malheiro

3 September 2022 5	Braga	1–0	Vitória de Guimarães	Braga
15:30 WEST (UTC+1)	Tormena 90+7'	Report		Stadium: Estádio Municipal de Braga; Attendance: 21,736; Referee: Nuno Almeida

9 September 2022 6	Vitória de Guimarães	1–0	Santa Clara	Guimarães
20:15 WEST (UTC+1)	Anderson 48'	Report		Stadium: Estádio D. Afonso Henriques; Attendance: 12,132; Referee: João Pinheiro

18 September 2022 7	Arouca	2–2	Vitória de Guimarães	Arouca
15:30 WEST (UTC+1)	Bukia 33'; Quaresma 71'	Report	Anderson 57'; Lameiras 90+12'	Stadium: Estádio Municipal de Arouca; Attendance: 2,376; Referee: Fábio Veríssimo

1 October 2022 8	Vitória de Guimarães	0–0	Benfica	Guimarães
20:30 WEST (UTC+1)		Report		Stadium: Estádio D. Afonso Henriques; Attendance: 19,231; Referee: Rui Costa

8 October 2023 9	Paços de Ferreira	0–1	Vitória de Guimarães	Paços de Ferreira
20:30 WEST (UTC+01:00)		Report	da Luz 8'	Stadium: Estádio da Mata Real; Attendance: 5,346; Referee: Nuno Almeida

23 October 2022 10	Vitória de Guimarães	3–2	Boavista	Guimarães
20:30 WEST (UTC+1)	Silva 20'; Janvier 87'; Amaro 90+3'	Report	Sasso 45+3'; Agra 71'	Stadium: Estádio D. Afonso Henriques; Attendance: 11,359; Referee: Fábio Veríssimo

31 October 2022 11	Vitória de Guimarães	3–2	Famalicão	Guimarães
20:15 WEST (UTC+1)	Johnston 20'; da Luz 55' 64'–	Report	Millán 74' 83'	Stadium: Estádio D. Afonso Henriques; Attendance: 14,968; Referee: António Nobre

5 November 2023 12	Sporting CP	3–0	Vitória de Guimarães	Lisbon
20:30 WET (UTC±00:00)	Morita (yellow card) 15' (goal) 40'; Edwards 34' 55'	Report	Freitas (yellow card) 17' (yellow-red card) 26'; Tiago Silva (yellow card) 50'; Bamba (yellow card) 52'; André André (yellow card) 66'	Stadium: Estádio José Alvalade; Attendance: 27,324; Referee: (Portugal) Manuel Mota

13 November 2022 13	Vitória de Guimarães	1–0	Marítimo	Guimarães
15:30 WEST (UTC+1)	Johnston (yellow card) 57'; Tiago Silva 70'	Report	Matheus Costa (yellow card) 78'; Rafael Brito (yellow card) 90+5'	Stadium: Estádio D. Afonso Henriques; Attendance: 14,920; Referee: (France) Bastien Dechepy

30 December 2022 14	Vizela	3–0	Vitória de Guimarães	Vizela
19:00 WEST (UTC+01:00)	Nuno Moreira (yellow card) 27'; Samu 43' (pen.) 47'; Anderson (yellow card) 87'; Osmajić 90+4' (yellow card) 90+5'; Bruno Wilson (yellow card) 90+6'; Mendez (yellow card) 90+7'	Report	Tiago Silva (yellow card) 18'; Janvier (yellow card) 66'; André Silva (yellow card) 90+7'	Stadium: Estádio do FC Vizela; Attendance: 3,820; Referee: (Portugal) Rui Costa

7 January 2022 15	Vitória de Guimarães	0–0	Rio Ave	Guimarães
18:00 WET (UTC+1)	André Amaro (yellow card) 52'; Miguel Maga (yellow card) 56'; Bamba (yellow card) 90+3'	Report	Ruiz (yellow card) 43'; Pantalon (yellow card) 50'	Stadium: Estádio D. Afonso Henriques; Attendance: 9,200; Referee: (Portugal) André Narciso

16 January 2022 16	Gil Vicente	2–1	Vitória de Guimarães	Barcelos
21:15 WET (UTC+1)	Adrián Marín (yellow card) 6'; Ali Alipour 40'; Vitor Carvalho (yellow card) 48'; Fran Navarro 82'	Report	Anderson Silva 17' (yellow card) 48' (yellow-red card) 65'; Bamba (yellow card) 29'; Jorge Fernandes (yellow card) 43'	Stadium: Estádio Cidade de Barcelos; Attendance: 3,088; Referee: (Portugal) Fábio Veríssimo

21 January 2022 17	Vitória de Guimarães	0–1	Porto	Guimarães
20:30 WET (UTC+1)	Janvier (yellow card) 17'; Jota Silva (yellow card) 57'; Nelson da Luz (yellow card) 71'; Safira (yellow card) 87'; André Amaro (yellow card) 90'; Gonçalo Nogueira (yellow card) 90+2'	Report	Otávio (yellow card) 35'; Pepe (yellow card) 41'; João Mário 45+2'; Wendell (yellow card) 47'; Iván Marcano (yellow card) 81'	Stadium: Estádio D. Afonso Henriques; Attendance: 19,653; Referee: (Portugal) Luís Godinho

30 January 2023 18	Vitória de Guimarães	2–1	Chaves	Guimarães
20:15 WET (UTC+1)	Tiago Silva 18' (pen.) (yellow card) 60'; Bamba (yellow card) 22'; Jota Silva (yellow card) 79'; Safira 90+7'	Report	Carlos Ponck (yellow card) 30'; Bruno Langa (yellow card) 58'; Guima (yellow card) 73'; Abass Issah 90+5'	Stadium: Estádio D. Afonso Henriques; Attendance: 9,437; Referee: (Portugal) Hélder Malheiro

4 February 2023 19	Estoril	0–1	Vitória de Guimarães	Estoril
20:30 WET (UTC+1)	Delos (yellow card) 59'	Report	Safira 11'; André Amaro (yellow card) 76'	Stadium: Estádio António Coimbra da Mota; Attendance: 1,624; Referee: (Portugal) Fábio Veríssimo

11 February 2023 20	Vitória de Guimarães	1–0	Portimonense	Guimarães
20:30 WET (UTC+1)	Jota Silva 22' (yellow card) 74'; Bamba (yellow card) 73'	Report	Pedrão (yellow card) 45+4'; Lucão (yellow card) 75'	Stadium: Estádio D. Afonso Henriques; Attendance: 12,956; Referee: (Portugal) João Pinheiro

19 February 2023 21	Casa Pia	0–0	Vitória de Guimarães	Oeiras
20:30 WET (UTC+1)	Vasco Fernandes (yellow card) 49'; Soma (yellow card) 61'; Beni Mukendi (yellow card) 84'	Report	Tounkara (yellow card) 33'; Índio (yellow card) 78'	Stadium: Estádio Nacional; Attendance: 1,818; Referee: (Portugal) Cláudio Pereira

27 February 2023 22	Vitória de Guimarães	2–1	Braga	Guimarães
21:15 WET (UTC+1)	Jota Silva (yellow card) 23'; Tiago Silva 31' (pen.) (yellow card) 45+4' (yellow-red card) 54'; Safira 41' (yellow card) 44'; Anderson Silva (yellow card) 84'; Bamba (yellow card) 90+5'	Report	Niakaté (yellow card) 7' (red card) 29'; Vítor Tormena (yellow card) 16'; Álvaro Djaló (yellow card) 85' (yellow-red card) 90+4' (goal) 88'	Stadium: Estádio D. Afonso Henriques; Attendance: 19,072; Referee: (Portugal) Luis Godinho

5 March 2023 23	Santa Clara	1–3	Vitória de Guimarães	Ponta Delgada
18:00 WET (UTC+1)	Misao (yellow card) 34'; Rildo 64'; Costinha (yellow card) 90+1'; González (yellow card) 90+10'	Report	Safira 22' 30'; André Silva 44'; Rafa (yellow card) 90+9'	Stadium: Estádio de São Miguel; Attendance: 1,598; Referee: (Portugal) Manuel Mota

11 March 2023 24	Vitória de Guimarães	0–2	Arouca	Guimarães
18:00 WET (UTC+1)	André Silva (yellow card) 27'; Bamba (yellow card) 80'; André Amaro (yellow card) 90+7'	Report	Arsénio (yellow card) 36'; Galović (yellow card) 45'; Rafa Mújica 50'; Antony 77'; de Arruabarrena (yellow card) 90+7'	Stadium: Estádio D. Afonso Henriques; Attendance: 21,717; Referee: (Portugal) Hélder Malheiro

18 March 2023 25	Benfica	5–1	Vitória de Guimarães	Lisbon
18:00 WET (UTC+1)	Gonçalo Ramos 13' (yellow card) 65'; João Mário 28' (pen.) 36'; Dani Silva 69' (o.g.); António Silva 89'	Report	André Amaro (yellow card) 26'; André André (yellow card) 43'; André Silva 79'; Safira (yellow card) 87'	Stadium: Estádio da Luz; Attendance: 59,374; Referee: (Portugal) André Narciso

1 April 2023 26	Vitória de Guimarães	0–0	Paços de Ferreira	Guimarães
18:00 WET (UTC+1)	Tiago Silva (yellow card) 40'; Safira (yellow card) 45+1'	Report	Maracás (yellow card) 6'; Rui Pires (yellow card) 45+1'; Delgado (yellow card) 49'; José Marafona (yellow card) 77' (red card) 77'	Stadium: Estádio D. Afonso Henriques; Attendance: 14,784; Referee: (Portugal) Gustavo Correia

7 April 2023 27	Boavista	2–1	Vitória de Guimarães	Porto
20:30 WET (UTC+1)	Bruno Lourenço (yellow card) 8'; Salvador Agra 19' (yellow card) 61'; Makouta (yellow card) 37' (goal) 86'; Abascal (yellow card) 63' (red card) 90+11'; Pedro Malheiro (yellow card) 83'; Boženík (yellow card) 90+9'; Luís Santos (yellow card) 90+9'	Report	Miguel Maga (yellow card) 45+2'; André André 60' (yellow card) 68'; Afonso Freitas (yellow card) 65'; Dani Silva (yellow card) 65'; Bamba (yellow card) 84' (yellow-red card) 90+2'; Bruno Gaspar (red card) 90+12'	Stadium: Estádio do Bessa; Attendance: 5,756; Referee: (Portugal) António Nobre

14 April 2023 28	Famalicão	2–1	Vitória de Guimarães	Vila Nova de Famalicão
20:15 WET (UTC+1)	Cádiz 10'; Riccieli (red card) 23'; Youssouf (yellow card) 45+2'; Francisco Moura 70'	Report	Jota Silva (yellow card) 19'; Tounkara (yellow card) 25'; Tiago Silva (red card) 33'; Dani Silva 64'; Safira (yellow card) 90+6'	Stadium: Estádio Municipal 22 de Junho; Attendance: 4,042; Referee: (Portugal) André Narciso

24 April 2023 29	Vitória de Guimarães	0–2	Sporting CP	Guimarães
20:15 WET (UTC+1)	Miguel Maga (yellow card) 4'	Report	Pote 47'; Arthur Gomes 90+3'	Stadium: Estádio D. Afonso Henriques; Attendance: 21,893; Referee: (Portugal) Luis Godinho

29 April 2023 30	Marítimo	1–2	Vitória de Guimarães	Funchal
15:30 WET (UTC+1)	Mosquera (yellow card) 33'; Félix Correia (yellow card) 40'; Geny Catamo 87'; Riascos (yellow card) 90+11'; Diogo Mendes (yellow card) 90+11'	Report	Tiago Silva 37' (pen.) (yellow card) 38'; Jota Silva (yellow card) 42'; André Silva 65'; Zé Carlos (yellow card) 72'	Stadium: Estádio do Marítimo; Attendance: 9,274; Referee: (Portugal) António Nobre

7 May 2023 31	Vitória de Guimarães	3–0	Vizela	Guimarães
18:00 WET (UTC+1)	Villanueva 16'; André Silva 41'; Bamba (yellow card) 45+4'; Afonso Freitas 70'	Report	Osmajić (yellow card) 45+6'; Ivanildo Fernandes (yellow card) 45+12'	Stadium: Estádio D. Afonso Henriques; Attendance: 20,031; Referee: (Portugal) Hélder Malheiro

14 May 2023 32	Rio Ave	0–1	Vitória de Guimarães	Vila do Conde
15:30 WET (UTC+1)		Report	Tomás Händel 55'	Stadium: Estádio dos Arcos; Attendance: 4,001; Referee: (Portugal) Miguel Nogueira

21 May 2023 33	Vitória de Guimarães	1–0	Gil Vicente	Guimarães
15:30 WET (UTC+1)	Nelson da Luz (yellow card) 46'; André Silva (yellow card) 50'; Anderson Silva 90+3' (yellow card) 90+5'	Report	Aouacheria (yellow card) 45+4'; Vitor Carvalho (yellow card) 90+12'	Stadium: Estádio D. Afonso Henriques; Attendance: 22,733; Referee: (Portugal) Manuel Mota

27 May 2023 34	Porto	3–0	Vitória de Guimarães	Porto
18:00 WET (UTC+1)	Taremi 8'; Otávio 32' (yellow card) 72'; Evanilson 39'; Uribe (yellow card) 87'	Report	Tomás Händel (red card) 2'; Dani Silva (yellow card) 40'; Afonso Freitas (yellow card) 44'; Tounkara (yellow card) 62'; Tiago Silva (yellow card) 71'; Hélder Sá (yellow card) 72'; Matheus Índio (yellow card) 89'	Stadium: Estádio do Dragão; Attendance: 42,417; Referee: (Portugal) Artur Soares Dias

=== Taça de Portugal ===
15 October 2022 Third round	Canelas 2010	1–3	Vitória de Guimarães	Vila Nova de Gaia
15:00WEST (UTC+01:00)	Martins 45'	Report	André 22' (pen.); Johnston 26' 39'	Stadium: Estádio do Canelas; Referee: Helder Malheiro

9 November 2022 Fourth round	Vitória de Guimarães	2–1 (a.e.t.)	Vizela	Guimarães
18:45WEST (UTC+01:00)	Anderson 30' (o.g.); Jota Silva (yellow card) 64'; Bamba (yellow card) 90+3'; André Amaro (yellow card) 94'; Safira 99' (pen.); Dani Silva (yellow card) 116'	Report	Anderson (yellow card) 2' (yellow-red card) 104'; Tomás Silva (yellow card) 79' (yellow-red card) 119'; Zohi 80'; Luiz Felipe (yellow card) 98'; Kiki (yellow card) 105+2'	Stadium: Estádio D. Afonso Henriques; Referee: (Portugal) Claudio Pereira

11 January 2023 Fifth round	Braga	3–2	Vitória de Guimarães	Braga
18:45WEST (UTC+01:00)	Nuno Sequeira (yellow card) 23'; André Horta (yellow card) 45+2'; Vitinha (yellow card) 62' (goal) 83'; Abel Ruiz 80' 85'	Report	Jota Silva 16' (yellow card) 52'; André Amaro (yellow card) 45+2'; Anderson Silva 45+6'; Safira (yellow card) 89'	Stadium: Estádio Municipal de Braga; Referee: (Portugal) Artur Soares Dias

=== UEFA Europa Conference League ===
==== Second qualifying round ====
The draw for the second qualifying round was held on 15 June 2022.

21 July 2022 First leg	Vitória de Guimarães (Portugal)	3–0	(Hungary) Puskás Akadémia	Guimarães
20:30 WEST (UTC+1)	Lameiras 4'; Tiago Silva 39'; Anderson 65'			Stadium: Estádio D. Afonso Henriques; Attendance: 14,863; Referee: Henrik Nalbandyan (Armenia)

28 July 2022 Second leg	Puskás Akadémia (Hungary)	0–0 (0–3 agg.)	(Portugal) Vitória de Guimarães	Felcsút, Hungary
21:00 CEST (UTC+2)		Report		Stadium: Pancho Aréna; Attendance: 2,325; Referee: Jakob Alexander Sundberg (Denmark)

==== Third qualifying round ====
The draw for the third qualifying round was held on 18 July 2022.

4 August 2022 First leg	Hajduk Split (Croatia)	3–1	(Portugal) Vitória de Guimarães	Split, Croatia
21:00 CEST (UTC+2)	Sahiti 67'; Melnjak 75'; Krovinović 87'	Report	Miguel Maga 61'	Stadium: Stadion Poljud; Attendance: 32,000; Referee: Mohammed Al-Hakim (Sweden)

10 August 2022 Second leg	Vitória de Guimarães (Portugal)	1–0 (2–3 agg.)	(Croatia) Hajduk Split	Guimarães
17:00 WEST (UTC+1)	Anderson 5'	Report		Stadium: Estádio D. Afonso Henriques; Attendance: 15,214; Referee: Ali Palabıyık (Turkey)
