= 2023–24 Vitória S.C. season =

Vitória de Guimarães
2023–24 season
- Primeira Liga: 5th
- Taça de Portugal: Semi-finals
- Taça da Liga: Second round
- UEFA Europa Conference League: Second qualifying round
- Top goalscorer: League: Jota Silva (11); All: Jota Silva (15)
- Average home league attendance: 17,388
- Biggest win: Vitória de Guimarães 5–0 Chaves
- Biggest defeat: Benfica 4–0 Vitória de Guimarães

The 2023–24 season was the 102nd season in the history of Vitória Sport Clube, and the 17th consecutive season in Primeira Liga. In addition to the domestic league, the team participated in the Taça de Portugal, Taça da Liga and UEFA Europa Conference League.

== Squad ==
As of 31 January 2024

Note: Flags indicate national team as defined under FIFA eligibility rules; some limited exceptions apply. Players may hold more than one non-FIFA nationality.

No.	Pos.	Nation	Player
2	DF	POR	Miguel Maga
3	DF	VEN	Mikel Villanueva
4	DF	POR	Tomás Ribeiro
6	MF	POR	Manu Silva
7	FW	BRA	André Silva
8	MF	POR	Tomás Händel
10	MF	POR	Tiago Silva
11	FW	POR	Jota Silva
14	GK	CPV	Bruno Varela (Vice-captain)
17	MF	POR	João Mendes
18	FW	CPV	Telmo Arcanjo
19	DF	POR	Ricardo Mangas
21	MF	POR	André André (Captain)
22	FW	ESP	Adrián Butzke
24	DF	CRO	Toni Borevković
27	GK	BRA	Charles

No.	Pos.	Nation	Player
28	MF	POR	Zé Carlos
29	DF	FRA	Mamadou Tounkara
37	FW	BRA	Kaio César (on loan from Coritiba)
44	DF	POR	Jorge Fernandes
52	DF	POR	Alberto Costa
53	GK	POR	Rafa Oliveira
64	MF	POR	Gonçalo Nogueira
72	DF	POR	Afonso Freitas
76	DF	ANG	Bruno Gaspar
77	MF	POR	Nuno Santos
79	FW	POR	Nélson Oliveira
87	FW	POR	Jota Pereira
91	GK	POR	José Ribeiro
92	MF	POR	Diogo Sousa
98	MF	POR	Rodrigo Duarte

=== Out on loan ===
Note: Flags indicate national team as defined under FIFA eligibility rules; some limited exceptions apply. Players may hold more than one non-FIFA nationality.

No.	Pos.	Nation	Player
20	FW	ANG	Nélson da Luz (at Qingdao West Coast until 31 December 2024)
23	MF	BRA	Matheus Índio (at Vojvodina until 30 June 2024)
54	DF	POR	Gabriel Rodrigues (at Vianense until 30 June 2024)

== Transfers ==
=== In ===
Pos.	Player	Transferred from	Fee	Date	Source
MF	(Portugal) Telmo Arcanjo	(Portugal) Tondela	Undisclosed	1 July 2023	
DF	(Portugal) Ricardo Mangas	(Portugal) Boavista	Undisclosed	4 July 2023	
FW	(Spain) Adrián Butzke	(Spain) Granada	Undisclosed	6 July 2023	
MF	(Portugal) Nuno Santos	(United States) Charlotte FC	Undisclosed	19 July 2023	
DF	(Portugal) Tomás Ribeiro	(Switzerland) Grasshopper	Undisclosed	20 July 2023	
FW	(Portugal) Nélson Oliveira	(Turkey) Konyaspor	Free	24 January 2024	

== Competitions ==
=== Overall record ===
Competition	First match	Last match	Starting round	Final position	Record							
Competition	First match	Last match	Starting round	Final position	Pld	W	D	L	GF	GA	GD	Win %
Primeira Liga	13 August 2023	18 May 2024	Matchday 1	5th	34	19	6	9	52	38	+14	55.88
Taça de Portugal	22 October 2023	17 April 2024	Third round	Semi-finals	6	4	0	2	12	7	+5	66.67
Taça da Liga	9 September 2023		Second round	Second round	1	0	0	1	0	1	−1	0.00
UEFA Europa Conference League	27 July 2023	3 August 2023	Second qualifying round	Second qualifying round	2	1	0	1	4	4	+0	50.00
Total					43	24	6	13	68	50	+18	55.81

Source: Competitions

=== Primeira Liga ===
==== League table ====
Pos	Team	Pld	W	D	L	GF	GA	GD	Pts	Qualification or relegation
3	Porto	34	22	6	6	63	27	+36	72	Qualification for the Europa League league phase (Note: Porto qualified for the Europa League league phase by winning the 2023–24 Taça de Portugal.)
4	Braga	34	21	5	8	71	50	+21	68	Qualification for the Europa League second qualifying round (Note: Since the 2023–24 Taça de Portugal winners, Porto, finished in top three, the spot given to the third-placed team (Europa League second qualifying round) was passed to the fourth-placed team, and the spot given to the fourth-placed team (Conference League second qualifying round) was passed to the fifth-placed team.)
5	Vitória de Guimarães	34	19	6	9	52	38	+14	63	Qualification for the Conference League second qualifying round
6	Moreirense	34	16	7	11	36	35	+1	55	
7	Arouca	34	13	7	14	54	50	+4	46	

Source: Liga Portugal
Rules for classification: 1) Points; 2) Head-to-head points; 3) Head-to-head goal difference; 4) Head-to-head away goals scored; 5) Goal difference; 6) Matches won; 7) Goals scored; 8) Play-off.

==== Results summary ====
Overall								Home						Away					
Pld	W	D	L	GF	GA	GD	Pts	W	D	L	GF	GA	GD	W	D	L	GF	GA	GD
34	19	6	9	52	38	+14	63	11	2	4	31	18	+13	8	4	5	21	20	+1

==== Results by round ====
Round	1	2	3	4	5	6	7	8	9	10	11	12	13	14	15	16	17	18	19	20	21	22	23	24	25	26	27	28	29	30	31	32	33	34
Ground	A	H	H	A	H	A	H	A	H	A	H	A	H	A	H	A	H	H	A	A	H	A	H	A	H	A	H	A	H	A	H	A	H	A
Result	W	W	W	L	L	D	W	W	W	L	L	W	W	D	W	D	W	W	L	W	D	D	L	W	W	W	W	W	D	L	W	L	L	W
Position																																		

A = Away; H = Home; W = Win; D = Draw; L = Loss

==== Matches ====
The fixtures were announced on 5 July 2023.

13 August 2023 1	Estrela da Amadora	0–1	Vitória de Guimarães

19 August 2023 2	Vitória de Guimarães	2–1	Gil Vicente

27 August 2023 3	Vitória de Guimarães	2–0	Vizela

2 September 2023 4	Benfica	4–0	Vitória de Guimarães	Lisbon
	Jorge Fernandes 11' (o.g.); Bah (yellow card) 31'; Di María 33'; Kökçü 45+5'; Aursnes 46'; Otamendi (yellow card) 60'		Silva (yellow card) 17'; João Sabino Mendes (red card) 19'; Jota (yellow card) 40'; Händel (yellow card) 79'; Freitas (yellow card) 90+4'	Stadium: Estádio da Luz

17 September 2023 5	Vitória de Guimarães	1–2	Portimonense

23 September 2023 6	Casa Pia	0–0	Vitória de Guimarães

1 October 2023 7	Vitória de Guimarães	3–2	Estoril

8 October 2023 8	Famalicão	1–3	Vitória de Guimarães

28 October 2023 9	Vitória de Guimarães	5–0	Chaves

5 November 2023 10	Moreirense	1–0	Vitória de Guimarães

11 November 2023 11	Vitória de Guimarães	1–2	Porto

2 December 2023 12	Farense	1–2	Vitória de Guimarães

9 December 2023 13	Vitória de Guimarães	3–2	Sporting CP

16 December 2023 14	Boavista	1–1	Vitória de Guimarães

23 December 2023 15	Vitória de Guimarães	1–0	Rio Ave

6 January 2024 16	Braga	1–1	Vitória de Guimarães

15 January 2024 17	Vitória de Guimarães	2–1	Arouca	Guimarães
				Stadium: Estádio D. Afonso Henriques

21 January 2024 18	Vitória de Guimarães	3–0	Estrela da Amadora	Guimarães
				Stadium: Estádio D. Afonso Henriques

28 January 2024 19	Gil Vicente	1–0	Vitória de Guimarães

4 February 2024 20	Vizela	0–1	Vitória de Guimarães

11 February 2024 21	Vitória de Guimarães	2–2	Benfica	Guimarães
				Stadium: Estádio D. Afonso Henriques

7 April 2024 28	Porto	1–2	Vitória de Guimarães	Porto
				Stadium: Estádio do Dragão

13 April 2024 29	Vitória de Guimarães	1–1	Farense	Guimarães
				Stadium: Estádio D. Afonso Henriques

21 April 2024 30	Sporting CP	3–0	Vitória de Guimarães	Lisbon
				Stadium: Estádio José Alvalade

27 April 2024 31	Vitória de Guimarães	1–0	Boavista	Guimarães
				Stadium: Estádio D. Afonso Henriques

4 May 2024 32	Rio Ave	2–1	Vitória de Guimarães	Vila do Conde
				Stadium: Estádio dos Arcos

11 May 2024 33	Vitória de Guimarães	2–3	Braga	Guimarães
	Gaspar 10'; Mangas 80'		Bruma 24'; Horta 75'; Lopes 90+3'	Stadium: Estádio D. Afonso Henriques

18 May 2024 34	Arouca	1–3	Vitória de Guimarães	Arouca
	González 39' (pen.)		Oliveira 50'; Thiago 53' (o.g.); Manu Silva 62'	Stadium: Estádio Municipal de Arouca

=== Taça de Portugal ===
22 October 2023 Third round	Moncarapachense	1–3	Vitória de Guimarães	Almancil
15:00				Stadium: Estádio Algarve; Referee: Tiago Martins

25 November 2023 Fourth round	Vitória de Guimarães	4–1	Länk FC Vilaverdense	Guimarães
				Stadium: Estádio D. Afonso Henriques

3 April 2024 Semi-finals; First leg	Vitória de Guimarães	0–1	Porto	Guimarães
				Stadium: Estádio D. Afonso Henriques

17 April 2024 Semi-finals; Second leg	Porto	3–1	Vitória de Guimarães	Porto
				Stadium: Estádio do Dragão

=== Taça da Liga ===
9 September 2023 Second round	Vitória de Guimarães	0–1	Tondela	Guimarães
20:30			Daniel dos Anjos 56'	Stadium: Estádio D. Afonso Henriques; Referee: Manuel Oliveira

=== UEFA Europa Conference League ===
==== Second qualifying round ====
27 July 2023 First leg	Celje (Slovenia)	3–4	(Portugal) Vitória de Guimarães	Celje, Slovenia
20:00	Bobičanec 1'; Matko 59'; Edmilson 90+6'	Report	J. Silva 25'; A. Silva 35'; Amaro 70'; Nogueira 80'	Stadium: Stadion Z'dežele; Attendance: 2,840; Referee: Chrysovalantis Theouli (Cyprus)

3 August 2023 Second leg	Vitória de Guimarães (Portugal)	0–1 (a.e.t.) (4–4 agg.) (2–4 p)	(Slovenia) Celje	Guimarães, Portugal
20:15		Report	Bajde 65'	Stadium: Estádio D. Afonso Henriques; Attendance: 18,639; Referee: Viktor Kopiievskyi (Ukraine)
	Penalties
	T. Silva (penalty missed); Zé Carlos (penalty missed); Villanueva (penalty scored); Gaspar (penalty scored)		(penalty scored) Popović; (penalty missed) Kouter; (penalty scored) Bizjak; (penalty scored) Vrbanec; (penalty scored) Zec
