= 2023 UEFA European Under-21 Championship squads =

Football team member listings

The following is a list of squads for all sixteen national teams that competed at the 2023 UEFA European Under-21 Championship. Each national team had to submit a final squad of 23 players, three of whom had to be goalkeepers.

Players in boldface were capped at full international level at some point in their career.

Ages, caps, goals and clubs as of 21 June 2023.

== Group A ==
=== Belgium ===
A 23-player squad was announced on 14 June 2023. Arthur Vermeeren and Roméo Lavia withdrew due to injury; they were replaced by Arne Engels and Anthony Descotte.

Head coach: Jacky Mathijssen

No.	Pos.	Player	Date of birth (age)	Caps	Goals	Club
1	GK	Maarten Vandevoordt	26 February 2002 (aged 21)	8	0	(Royal Belgian Football Association) Genk
2	DF	**Hugo Siquet**	9 July 2002 (aged 20)	10	0	(Royal Belgian Football Association) Cercle Brugge
3	DF	**Zeno Debast**	24 October 2003 (aged 19)	0	0	(Royal Belgian Football Association) Anderlecht
4	DF	Ewoud Pletinckx	10 October 2000 (aged 22)	4	0	(Royal Belgian Football Association) OH Leuven
5	DF	**Koni De Winter**	12 June 2002 (aged 21)	10	0	(Italian Football Federation) Empoli
6	MF	**Aster Vranckx** (captain)	4 October 2002 (aged 20)	8	0	(Italian Football Federation) AC Milan
7	FW	**Loïs Openda**	16 February 2000 (aged 23)	1	0	(French Football Federation) Lens
8	MF	Eliot Matazo	15 February 2002 (aged 21)	9	0	(French Football Federation) Monaco
9	FW	Yorbe Vertessen	8 January 2001 (aged 22)	9	3	(Royal Belgian Football Association) Union Saint-Gilloise
10	FW	**Michel-Ange Balikwisha**	10 May 2001 (aged 22)	7	1	(Royal Belgian Football Association) Antwerp
11	FW	Largie Ramazani	27 February 2001 (aged 22)	4	2	(Royal Spanish Football Federation) Almería
12	GK	**Senne Lammens**	7 July 2002 (aged 20)	4	0	(Royal Belgian Football Association) Club Brugge
13	DF	Louis Patris	7 June 2001 (aged 22)	4	0	(Royal Belgian Football Association) OH Leuven
14	DF	**Maxim De Cuyper**	22 December 2000 (aged 22)	7	1	(Royal Belgian Football Association) Westerlo
15	DF	**Ameen Al-Dakhil**	1 April 2002 (aged 21)	3	0	(The Football Association) Burnley
16	MF	**Arne Engels**	8 September 2003 (aged 19)	1	0	(German Football Association) FC Augsburg
17	FW	Anthony Descotte	3 August 2003 (aged 19)	3	0	(Royal Dutch Football Association) FC Utrecht
18	MF	**Olivier Deman**	6 April 2000 (aged 23)	7	1	(Royal Belgian Football Association) Cercle Brugge
19	MF	**Mandela Keita**	10 May 2002 (aged 21)	4	0	(Royal Belgian Football Association) Antwerp
20	DF	Ignace Van Der Brempt	1 April 2002 (aged 21)	10	1	(Austrian Football Association) Red Bull Salzburg
21	GK	Maxime Delanghe	23 May 2001 (aged 22)	2	0	(Royal Belgian Football Association) Lierse
22	FW	**Charles De Ketelaere**	10 March 2001 (aged 22)	6	1	(Italian Football Federation) AC Milan
23	MF	**Nicolas Raskin**	23 February 2001 (aged 22)	6	1	(Scottish Football Association) Rangers

=== Georgia ===
A 23-player squad was announced on 15 June 2023.

Head coach: Ramaz Svanadze

No.	Pos.	Player	Date of birth (age)	Caps	Goals	Club
1	GK	**Giorgi Mamardashvili**	29 September 2000 (aged 22)	4	0	(Royal Spanish Football Federation) Valencia
2	DF	Tsotne Kapanadze	30 August 2001 (aged 21)	9	2	(Georgian Football Federation) Saburtalo Tbilisi
3	DF	**Iva Gelashvili**	8 April 2001 (aged 22)	9	0	(Georgian Football Federation) Saburtalo Tbilisi
4	DF	**Aleksandre Kalandadze**	9 May 2001 (aged 22)	10	0	(Georgian Football Federation) Dinamo Tbilisi
5	DF	**Saba Khvadagiani**	30 January 2003 (aged 20)	7	1	(Georgian Football Federation) Dinamo Tbilisi
6	MF	**Luka Gagnidze**	28 February 2003 (aged 20)	4	0	(Russian Football Union) Dynamo Moscow
7	FW	**Zuriko Davitashvili**	15 February 2001 (aged 22)	4	0	(French Football Federation) Bordeaux
8	MF	**Anzor Mekvabishvili** (captain)	5 June 2001 (aged 22)	9	1	(Georgian Football Federation) Dinamo Tbilisi
9	FW	**Giorgi Guliashvili**	5 September 2001 (aged 21)	15	7	(Football Association of Bosnia and Herzegovina) Sarajevo
10	MF	Giorgi Moistsrapishvili	29 September 2001 (aged 21)	8	3	(Georgian Football Federation) Dinamo Tbilisi
11	FW	Giorgi Gagua	10 October 2001 (aged 21)	9	0	(Royal Spanish Football Federation) Real Unión
12	GK	Nodari Kalichava	24 November 2000 (aged 22)	0	0	(Georgian Football Federation) Samgurali Tsqaltubo
13	DF	**Giorgi Gocholeishvili**	14 February 2001 (aged 22)	7	1	(Ukrainian Association of Football) Shakhtar Donetsk
14	MF	**Gabriel Sigua**	30 June 2005 (aged 17)	1	0	(Georgian Football Federation) Dinamo Tbilisi
15	DF	**Saba Sazonov**	1 February 2002 (aged 21)	2	0	(Russian Football Union) Dynamo Moscow
16	DF	**Irakli Azarovi**	21 February 2002 (aged 21)	8	0	(Football Association of Serbia) Red Star Belgrade
17	FW	Nika Khorkheli	9 September 2001 (aged 21)	5	1	(Georgian Football Federation) Samgurali Tsqaltubo
18	MF	Otar Mamageishvili	15 January 2003 (aged 20)	3	0	(Georgian Football Federation) Saburtalo Tbilisi
19	FW	**Heorhiy Tsitaishvili**	18 November 2000 (aged 22)	0	0	(Polish Football Association) Lech Poznań
20	MF	Nika Gagnidze	20 March 2001 (aged 22)	9	0	(Georgian Football Federation) Dila Gori
21	MF	Nodar Lominadze	4 April 2002 (aged 21)	1	0	(Georgian Football Federation) Samgurali Tsqaltubo
22	DF	Giorgi Jinjolava	28 June 2000 (aged 22)	8	0	(Georgian Football Federation) Saburtalo Tbilisi
23	GK	Luka Kutaladze	27 April 2001 (aged 22)	4	0	(Georgian Football Federation) Dinamo Tbilisi

=== Netherlands ===
The final roster was announced on 29 May 2023. Sepp van den Berg had an injury and was replaced by Shurandy Sambo.

Head coach: Erwin van de Looi

No.	Pos.	Player	Date of birth (age)	Caps	Goals	Club
1	GK	**Bart Verbruggen**	18 August 2002 (aged 20)	1	0	(Royal Belgian Football Association) Anderlecht
2	DF	**Devyne Rensch**	18 January 2003 (aged 20)	7	0	(Royal Dutch Football Association) Ajax
3	DF	**Jan Paul van Hecke**	8 June 2000 (aged 23)	5	0	(The Football Association) Brighton & Hove Albion
4	DF	**Micky van de Ven**	19 April 2001 (aged 22)	8	0	(German Football Association) VfL Wolfsburg
5	DF	**Quilindschy Hartman**	14 November 2001 (aged 21)	2	0	(Royal Dutch Football Association) Feyenoord
6	MF	**Quinten Timber** (captain)	17 June 2001 (aged 22)	12	1	(Royal Dutch Football Association) Feyenoord
7	FW	**Crysencio Summerville**	30 October 2001 (aged 21)	5	2	(The Football Association) Leeds United
8	MF	**Ryan Gravenberch**	16 May 2002 (aged 21)	8	1	(German Football Association) Bayern Munich
9	FW	**Brian Brobbey**	1 February 2002 (aged 21)	14	8	(Royal Dutch Football Association) Ajax
10	MF	**Kenneth Taylor**	16 May 2002 (aged 21)	10	0	(Royal Dutch Football Association) Ajax
11	MF	Jurgen Ekkelenkamp	5 April 2000 (aged 23)	19	7	(Royal Belgian Football Association) Antwerp
12	DF	Milan van Ewijk	8 September 2000 (aged 22)	5	0	(Royal Dutch Football Association) Heerenveen
13	DF	**Shurandy Sambo**	19 August 2001 (aged 21)	2	0	(Royal Dutch Football Association) Sparta Rotterdam
14	MF	Ludovit Reis	1 June 2000 (aged 23)	17	1	(German Football Association) Hamburger SV
15	DF	**Ian Maatsen**	10 March 2002 (aged 21)	10	1	(The Football Association) Burnley
16	GK	Kjell Scherpen	23 January 2000 (aged 23)	18	0	(Royal Dutch Football Association) Vitesse
17	FW	Million Manhoef	3 January 2002 (aged 21)	3	1	(Royal Dutch Football Association) Vitesse
18	MF	Wouter Burger	16 February 2001 (aged 22)	7	0	(Swiss Football Association) Basel
19	FW	**Thijs Dallinga**	3 August 2000 (aged 22)	5	0	(French Football Federation) Toulouse
20	FW	**Joshua Zirkzee**	21 May 2001 (aged 22)	16	7	(Italian Football Federation) Bologna
21	MF	Sven Mijnans	9 March 2000 (aged 23)	3	0	(Royal Dutch Football Association) AZ
22	FW	Elayis Tavşan	30 April 2001 (aged 22)	9	4	(Royal Dutch Football Association) NEC
23	GK	Jasper Schendelaar	2 September 2000 (aged 22)	1	0	(Royal Dutch Football Association) PEC Zwolle

=== Portugal ===
A 25-player preliminary squad was announced on 31 May 2023. The final squad was revealed on 14 June. Tomás Tavares and Fábio Vieira withdrew due to injury and were replaced by Bernardo Vital and Diego Moreira.

Head coach: Rui Jorge

No.	Pos.	Player	Date of birth (age)	Caps	Goals	Club
1	GK	Celton Biai	13 August 2000 (aged 22)	9	0	(Portuguese Football Federation) Vitória de Guimarães
2	DF	Bernardo Vital	29 December 2000 (aged 22)	3	0	(Portuguese Football Federation) Estoril
3	DF	André Amaro	13 August 2002 (aged 20)	1	0	(Portuguese Football Federation) Vitória de Guimarães
4	MF	**Samú Costa**	27 November 2000 (aged 22)	3	1	(Royal Spanish Football Federation) Almería
5	DF	**Nuno Tavares**	26 January 2000 (aged 23)	12	1	(French Football Federation) Marseille
6	MF	Tiago Dantas (captain)	24 December 2000 (aged 22)	14	0	(Hellenic Football Federation) PAOK
7	FW	**Pedro Neto**	9 March 2000 (aged 23)	6	3	(The Football Association) Wolverhampton Wanderers
8	MF	Paulo Bernardo	24 January 2002 (aged 21)	12	5	(Portuguese Football Federation) Paços de Ferreira
9	FW	Henrique Araújo	19 January 2002 (aged 21)	13	7	(The Football Association) Watford
10	MF	Afonso Sousa	3 May 2000 (aged 23)	11	3	(Polish Football Association) Lech Poznań
11	FW	**Francisco Conceição**	14 December 2002 (aged 20)	16	3	(Royal Dutch Football Association) Ajax
12	GK	Samuel Soares	15 June 2002 (aged 21)	5	0	(Portuguese Football Federation) Benfica
13	DF	Zé Carlos	30 October 2001 (aged 21)	6	0	(Portuguese Football Federation) Vitória de Guimarães
14	DF	**Tomás Araújo**	16 May 2002 (aged 21)	2	0	(Portuguese Football Federation) Gil Vicente
15	DF	Leonardo Lelo	30 March 2000 (aged 23)	5	0	(Portuguese Football Federation) Casa Pia
16	DF	Alexandre Penetra	9 September 2001 (aged 21)	5	0	(Portuguese Football Federation) Famalicão
17	MF	**João Neves**	27 September 2004 (aged 18)	0	0	(Portuguese Football Federation) Benfica
18	MF	André Almeida	30 May 2000 (aged 23)	12	2	(Royal Spanish Football Federation) Valencia
19	FW	Vitinha	15 March 2000 (aged 23)	8	4	(French Football Federation) Marseille
20	FW	**Fábio Silva**	19 July 2002 (aged 20)	12	6	(Royal Dutch Football Association) PSV Eindhoven
21	MF	Vasco Sousa	3 April 2003 (aged 20)	6	0	(Portuguese Football Federation) Porto
22	GK	Francisco Meixedo	19 May 2001 (aged 22)	0	0	(Portuguese Football Federation) Porto
23	FW	**Diego Moreira**	6 August 2004 (aged 18)	0	0	(Portuguese Football Federation) Benfica

== Group B ==
=== Croatia ===
Head coach: Dragan Skočić

No.	Pos.	Player	Date of birth (age)	Caps	Goals	Club
1	GK	**Dominik Kotarski**	10 February 2000 (aged 23)	13	0	(Hellenic Football Federation) PAOK
2	DF	**Niko Sigur** (Note: Capped for Canada)	9 September 2003 (aged 19)	0	0	(Croatian Football Federation) HNK Hajduk Split
3	DF	David Čolina	19 July 2000 (aged 22)	16	0	(German Football Association) FC Augsburg
4	MF	Ante Palaversa	6 April 2000 (aged 23)	10	0	(French Football Federation) Troyes
5	DF	Nikola Soldo	25 January 2001 (aged 22)	8	1	(German Football Association) 1. FC Köln
6	DF	Bartol Franjić (captain)	22 March 2000 (aged 23)	12	1	(German Football Association) VfL Wolfsburg
7	FW	Michele Šego	5 August 2000 (aged 22)	4	0	(Croatian Football Federation) Varaždin
8	MF	Jurica Pršir	29 May 2000 (aged 23)	12	1	(Croatian Football Federation) Gorica
9	FW	Roko Šimić	10 September 2003 (aged 19)	15	7	(Swiss Football Association) Zürich
10	MF	**Martin Baturina**	16 February 2003 (aged 20)	9	1	(Croatian Football Federation) Dinamo Zagreb
11	MF	Lukas Kačavenda	2 March 2003 (aged 20)	10	1	(Croatian Football Federation) Lokomotiva Zagreb
12	GK	Ivor Pandur	25 March 2000 (aged 23)	4	0	(Royal Dutch Football Association) Fortuna Sittard
13	FW	Matija Frigan	11 February 2003 (aged 20)	2	0	(Croatian Football Federation) Rijeka
14	DF	Niko Galešić	26 March 2001 (aged 22)	0	0	(Croatian Football Federation) Rijeka
15	MF	Mauro Perković	9 March 2003 (aged 20)	3	0	(Croatian Football Federation) Dinamo Zagreb
16	DF	Krešimir Krizmanić	3 July 2000 (aged 22)	7	0	(Croatian Football Federation) Gorica
17	FW	Luka Stojković	28 October 2003 (aged 19)	4	0	(Croatian Football Federation) Lokomotiva Zagreb
18	FW	Gabriel Vidović	1 December 2003 (aged 19)	7	2	(Royal Dutch Football Association) Vitesse
19	MF	Marko Bulat	9 March 2001 (aged 22)	3	0	(Croatian Football Federation) Dinamo Zagreb
20	FW	**Dion Drena Beljo**	1 March 2002 (aged 21)	9	2	(German Football Association) FC Augsburg
21	MF	Veldin Hodža	15 October 2002 (aged 20)	7	0	(Croatian Football Federation) Rijeka
22	MF	**Toni Fruk**	9 March 2001 (aged 22)	5	2	(Croatian Football Federation) Gorica
23	GK	Nikola Čavlina	2 June 2002 (aged 21)	1	0	(Croatian Football Federation) Lokomotiva Zagreb

=== Romania ===
The final squad was announced on 15 June 2023.

Head coach: Emil Săndoi

No.	Pos.	Player	Date of birth (age)	Caps	Goals	Club
1	GK	**Ștefan Târnovanu**	9 May 2000 (aged 23)	2	0	(Romanian Football Federation) FCSB
2	DF	**Alexandru Pantea**	11 September 2003 (aged 19)	2	0	(Romanian Football Federation) FCSB
3	DF	Valentin Țicu	19 September 2000 (aged 22)	8	0	(Romanian Football Federation) Petrolul Ploiești
4	DF	**Bogdan Racovițan**	6 June 2000 (aged 23)	7	1	(Polish Football Association) Raków Częstochowa
5	DF	Mihai Lixandru	5 June 2001 (aged 22)	6	0	(Romanian Football Federation) Mioveni
6	MF	Dragoș Albu	15 March 2001 (aged 22)	8	1	(Romanian Football Federation) FC U Craiova
7	MF	**Claudiu Petrila**	7 November 2000 (aged 22)	10	0	(Romanian Football Federation) CFR Cluj
8	MF	**David Miculescu**	2 May 2001 (aged 22)	13	2	(Romanian Football Federation) FCSB
9	FW	**Jovan Marković**	23 March 2001 (aged 22)	11	3	(Romanian Football Federation) Universitatea Craiova
10	MF	Alexandru Cîmpanu	8 October 2000 (aged 22)	8	1	(Romanian Football Federation) Universitatea Craiova
11	MF	Alexandru Ișfan	31 January 2000 (aged 23)	4	0	(Romanian Football Federation) Universitatea Craiova
12	GK	Mihai Popa	12 October 2000 (aged 22)	8	0	(Romanian Football Federation) Voluntari
13	MF	**Vladimir Screciu** (captain)	13 January 2000 (aged 23)	11	0	(Romanian Football Federation) Universitatea Craiova
14	DF	Victor Dican	11 October 2000 (aged 22)	11	0	(Romanian Football Federation) Botoșani
15	DF	**Andrei Borza**	12 November 2005 (aged 17)	0	0	(Romanian Football Federation) Farul Constanța
16	MF	Adrian Mazilu	13 September 2005 (aged 17)	1	0	(Romanian Football Federation) Farul Constanța
17	MF	Alexi Pitu	5 June 2002 (aged 21)	8	0	(French Football Federation) Bordeaux
18	MF	**Octavian Popescu**	27 December 2002 (aged 20)	8	1	(Romanian Football Federation) FCSB
19	FW	**Louis Munteanu**	16 June 2002 (aged 21)	3	0	(Romanian Football Federation) Farul Constanța
20	DF	Andres Dumitrescu	11 March 2001 (aged 22)	7	0	(Romanian Football Federation) Sepsi OSK
21	FW	**Daniel Bîrligea**	19 April 2000 (aged 23)	10	4	(Romanian Football Federation) CFR Cluj
22	MF	Vlad Pop	31 August 2000 (aged 22)	6	0	(Romanian Football Federation) FC U Craiova
23	GK	Andrei Gorcea	2 August 2001 (aged 21)	0	0	(Romanian Football Federation) Universitatea Cluj

=== Spain ===
The final squad was announced on 14 June 2023.

Head coach: Santi Denia

No.	Pos.	Player	Date of birth (age)	Caps	Goals	Club
1	GK	Arnau Tenas	30 May 2001 (aged 22)	8	0	(Royal Spanish Football Federation) Barcelona
2	DF	Víctor Gómez	1 April 2000 (aged 23)	7	1	(Portuguese Football Federation) Braga
3	DF	**Juan Miranda**	19 January 2000 (aged 23)	19	3	(Royal Spanish Football Federation) Real Betis
4	MF	**Hugo Guillamón**	31 January 2000 (aged 23)	16	3	(Royal Spanish Football Federation) Valencia
5	DF	Jon Pacheco	9 January 2001 (aged 22)	10	0	(Royal Spanish Football Federation) Real Sociedad
6	MF	**Antonio Blanco**	23 July 2000 (aged 22)	7	0	(Royal Spanish Football Federation) Alavés
7	FW	**Rodrigo Riquelme**	2 April 2000 (aged 23)	10	5	(Royal Spanish Football Federation) Girona
8	MF	**Oihan Sancet**	25 April 2000 (aged 23)	7	0	(Royal Spanish Football Federation) Athletic Bilbao
9	FW	**Abel Ruiz**	28 January 2000 (aged 23)	21	10	(Portuguese Football Federation) Braga
10	MF	Rodri Sánchez	16 May 2000 (aged 23)	12	3	(Royal Spanish Football Federation) Real Betis
11	FW	**Ander Barrenetxea**	27 December 2001 (aged 21)	8	1	(Royal Spanish Football Federation) Real Sociedad
12	DF	Arnau Martínez	25 April 2003 (aged 20)	6	0	(Royal Spanish Football Federation) Girona
13	GK	Julen Agirrezabala	26 December 2000 (aged 22)	7	0	(Royal Spanish Football Federation) Athletic Bilbao
14	DF	**Aitor Paredes**	29 April 2000 (aged 23)	2	0	(Royal Spanish Football Federation) Athletic Bilbao
15	DF	Mario Gila	29 August 2000 (aged 22)	6	0	(Italian Football Federation) Lazio
16	MF	**Álex Baena**	20 July 2001 (aged 21)	7	1	(Royal Spanish Football Federation) Villarreal
17	DF	**Sergio Gómez**	4 September 2000 (aged 22)	13	6	(The Football Association) Manchester City
18	MF	Gabri Veiga	27 May 2002 (aged 21)	2	0	(Royal Spanish Football Federation) Celta Vigo
19	MF	Aimar Oroz	27 November 2001 (aged 21)	3	1	(Royal Spanish Football Federation) Osasuna
20	DF	Manu Sánchez	24 August 2000 (aged 22)	9	3	(Royal Spanish Football Federation) Osasuna
21	FW	Sergio Camello	10 February 2001 (aged 22)	10	0	(Royal Spanish Football Federation) Rayo Vallecano
22	MF	Adrián Bernabé	26 May 2001 (aged 22)	2	0	(Italian Football Federation) Parma
23	GK	**Leo Román**	6 July 2000 (aged 22)	1	0	(Royal Spanish Football Federation) Mallorca

=== Ukraine ===
The final squad was announced on 15 June 2023. On 20 June 2023, Mykola Mykhaylenko withdrew from the squad due to injury and was replaced by Volodymyr Salyuk.

Head coach: Ruslan Rotan

No.	Pos.	Player	Date of birth (age)	Caps	Goals	Club
1	GK	Ruslan Neshcheret	22 January 2002 (aged 21)	9	0	(Ukrainian Association of Football) Dynamo Kyiv
2	DF	Kostyantyn Vivcharenko	10 June 2002 (aged 21)	19	2	(Ukrainian Association of Football) Dynamo Kyiv
3	DF	**Oleksandr Syrota**	11 June 2000 (aged 23)	9	1	(Ukrainian Association of Football) Dynamo Kyiv
4	DF	**Maksym Talovyerov**	28 June 2000 (aged 22)	17	0	(Austrian Football Association) LASK
5	MF	Ivan Zhelizko	12 February 2001 (aged 22)	18	0	(Latvian Football Federation) Valmiera
6	DF	**Oleksiy Sych**	1 April 2001 (aged 22)	17	0	(Royal Belgian Football Association) Kortrijk
7	FW	Bohdan Viunnyk	21 May 2002 (aged 21)	19	4	(Austrian Football Association) Grazer AK
8	DF	Volodymyr Salyuk	25 June 2002 (aged 20)	1	0	(Ukrainian Association of Football) Chornomorets Odesa
9	FW	**Danylo Sikan**	16 April 2001 (aged 22)	14	8	(Ukrainian Association of Football) Shakhtar Donetsk
10	MF	**Mykhailo Mudryk**	5 January 2001 (aged 22)	16	3	(The Football Association) Chelsea
11	FW	**Vladyslav Vanat**	4 January 2002 (aged 21)	9	3	(Ukrainian Association of Football) Dynamo Kyiv
12	GK	**Anatoliy Trubin**	1 August 2001 (aged 21)	11	0	(Ukrainian Association of Football) Shakhtar Donetsk
13	DF	Rostyslav Lyakh	12 October 2000 (aged 22)	6	0	(Ukrainian Association of Football) Rukh Lviv
14	MF	**Oleksandr Nazarenko**	1 February 2000 (aged 23)	19	1	(Ukrainian Association of Football) Dnipro-1
15	DF	Maksym Braharu	21 July 2002 (aged 20)	10	1	(Ukrainian Association of Football) Chornomorets Odesa
16	DF	Arseniy Batahov	5 March 2002 (aged 21)	19	0	(Ukrainian Association of Football) Zorya Luhansk
17	MF	**Volodymyr Brazhko**	23 January 2002 (aged 21)	10	1	(Ukrainian Association of Football) Zorya Luhansk
18	MF	**Dmytro Kryskiv**	6 October 2000 (aged 22)	17	4	(Ukrainian Association of Football) Shakhtar Donetsk
19	MF	**Oleh Ocheretko**	25 May 2003 (aged 20)	11	1	(Ukrainian Association of Football) Shakhtar Donetsk
20	MF	**Oleksiy Kashchuk**	29 June 2000 (aged 22)	8	2	(Association of Football Federations of Azerbaijan) Sabah
21	MF	**Artem Bondarenko** (captain)	21 August 2000 (aged 22)	19	3	(Ukrainian Association of Football) Shakhtar Donetsk
22	MF	**Heorhiy Sudakov**	1 September 2002 (aged 20)	15	3	(Ukrainian Association of Football) Shakhtar Donetsk
23	GK	Kiril Fesyun	7 August 2002 (aged 20)	6	0	(Ukrainian Association of Football) Kolos Kovalivka

== Group C ==
=== Czech Republic ===
The final squad was announced on 5 June 2023. In the following days, injured goalkeepers Matěj Kovář and Antonín Kinský were replaced.

Head coach: Jan Suchopárek

No.	Pos.	Player	Date of birth (age)	Caps	Goals	Club
1	GK	**Vítězslav Jaroš**	23 July 2001 (aged 21)	3	0	(The Football Association) Stockport County
2	DF	**Martin Vitík**	21 January 2003 (aged 20)	12	1	(Football Association of the Czech Republic) Sparta Prague
3	DF	**Robin Hranáč**	29 January 2000 (aged 23)	9	0	(Football Association of the Czech Republic) Pardubice
4	DF	**Adam Gabriel**	28 May 2001 (aged 22)	11	3	(Football Association of the Czech Republic) Hradec Králové
5	DF	Karel Pojezný	23 September 2001 (aged 21)	2	0	(Football Association of the Czech Republic) Baník Ostrava
6	DF	Michal Fukala	22 October 2000 (aged 22)	10	0	(Football Association of the Czech Republic) Slovan Liberec
7	FW	**Vasil Kušej**	24 May 2000 (aged 23)	4	0	(Football Association of the Czech Republic) Mladá Boleslav
8	MF	**Lukáš Červ**	10 April 2001 (aged 22)	11	0	(Football Association of the Czech Republic) Slovan Liberec
9	FW	Václav Sejk	18 May 2002 (aged 21)	15	5	(Football Association of the Czech Republic) Jablonec
10	MF	**Adam Karabec**	2 July 2003 (aged 19)	14	4	(Football Association of the Czech Republic) Sparta Prague
11	MF	**Pavel Šulc**	29 December 2000 (aged 22)	17	2	(Football Association of the Czech Republic) Jablonec
12	DF	Martin Cedidla	22 November 2001 (aged 21)	5	0	(Football Association of the Czech Republic) Trinity Zlín
13	MF	Kryštof Daněk	5 January 2003 (aged 20)	10	2	(Football Association of the Czech Republic) Sparta Prague
14	FW	Daniel Fila	21 August 2002 (aged 20)	10	5	(Football Association of the Czech Republic) Teplice
15	FW	Matěj Koubek	10 January 2000 (aged 23)	4	0	(Football Association of the Czech Republic) Hradec Králové
16	GK	Vladimír Neuman	10 February 2000 (aged 23)	0	0	(Football Association of the Czech Republic) Karvina
17	MF	**Matěj Jurásek**	30 August 2003 (aged 19)	2	0	(Football Association of the Czech Republic) Slavia Prague
18	DF	David Pech	22 February 2002 (aged 21)	4	0	(Football Association of the Czech Republic) Slavia Prague
19	DF	**Tomáš Vlček**	28 February 2001 (aged 22)	3	0	(Football Association of the Czech Republic) Pardubice
20	MF	Jan Žambůrek	13 February 2001 (aged 22)	12	0	(Danish Football Association) Viborg
21	MF	Matěj Valenta	9 February 2000 (aged 23)	5	1	(Football Association of the Czech Republic) Slovan Liberec
22	MF	Filip Kaloč	27 February 2000 (aged 23)	11	0	(Football Association of the Czech Republic) Baník Ostrava
23	GK	Jakub Markovič	13 July 2001 (aged 21)	1	0	(Football Association of the Czech Republic) Pardubice

=== England ===
The final squad was announced on 14 June 2023.

Head coach: Lee Carsley

No.	Pos.	Player	Date of birth (age)	Caps	Goals	Club
1	GK	**James Trafford**	10 October 2002 (aged 20)	4	0	(The Football Association) Manchester City
2	DF	Max Aarons	4 January 2000 (aged 23)	22	0	(The Football Association) Norwich City
3	DF	Luke Thomas	10 June 2001 (aged 21)	12	0	(The Football Association) Leicester City
4	DF	**Levi Colwill**	26 February 2003 (aged 19)	5	0	(The Football Association) Chelsea
5	DF	**Taylor Harwood-Bellis** (captain)	30 January 2002 (aged 21)	13	0	(The Football Association) Manchester City
6	MF	Oliver Skipp	16 September 2000 (aged 22)	17	0	(The Football Association) Tottenham Hotspur
7	MF	**Morgan Gibbs-White**	27 January 2000 (aged 23)	12	2	(The Football Association) Nottingham Forest
8	MF	Jacob Ramsey	28 May 2001 (aged 21)	11	3	(The Football Association) Aston Villa
9	FW	Cameron Archer	9 December 2001 (aged 21)	5	4	(The Football Association) Aston Villa
10	MF	**Emile Smith Rowe**	28 July 2000 (aged 22)	9	3	(The Football Association) Arsenal
11	MF	**Anthony Gordon**	24 February 2001 (aged 21)	9	4	(The Football Association) Newcastle United
12	DF	**Jarrad Branthwaite**	27 June 2002 (aged 20)	0	0	(Royal Dutch Football Association) PSV Eindhoven
13	GK	Josh Griffiths	5 September 2001 (aged 21)	1	0	(The Football Association) West Bromwich Albion
14	MF	**James Garner**	13 March 2001 (aged 21)	11	0	(The Football Association) Everton
15	DF	Charlie Cresswell	17 August 2002 (aged 20)	9	0	(The Football Association) Leeds United
16	DF	Ben Johnson	24 January 2000 (aged 23)	6	0	(The Football Association) West Ham United
17	MF	**Curtis Jones**	30 January 2001 (aged 22)	14	4	(The Football Association) Liverpool
18	MF	Tommy Doyle	17 October 2001 (aged 21)	10	0	(The Football Association) Manchester City
19	MF	Harvey Elliott	4 April 2003 (aged 19)	7	0	(The Football Association) Liverpool
20	MF	**Cole Palmer**	6 May 2002 (aged 20)	8	3	(The Football Association) Manchester City
21	MF	**Angel Gomes**	31 August 2000 (aged 22)	13	0	(French Football Federation) Lille
22	GK	Carl Rushworth	2 July 2001 (aged 21)	0	0	(The Football Association) Brighton & Hove Albion
23	MF	**Noni Madueke**	10 March 2002 (aged 20)	6	1	(The Football Association) Chelsea

=== Germany ===
A 26-player preliminary squad was announced on 2 June 2023. The final squad was revealed on 14 June. Ansgar Knauff had to withdraw because of an injury on 17 June and was replaced by Finn Ole Becker.

Head coach: Antonio Di Salvo

No.	Pos.	Player	Date of birth (age)	Caps	Goals	Club
1	GK	Noah Atubolu	25 May 2002 (aged 20)	7	0	(German Football Association) SC Freiburg
2	DF	**Josha Vagnoman**	12 November 2000 (aged 22)	12	0	(German Football Association) VfB Stuttgart
3	DF	Kenneth Schmidt	3 June 2002 (aged 20)	1	0	(German Football Association) SC Freiburg
4	DF	**Márton Dárdai** (Note: Capped for Hungary)	12 February 2002 (aged 21)	5	0	(German Football Association) Hertha BSC
5	DF	**Yann Aurel Bisseck** (captain)	29 November 2000 (aged 22)	5	0	(Danish Football Association) AGF
6	MF	Tom Krauß	22 June 2001 (aged 21)	11	3	(German Football Association) Schalke 04
7	MF	Finn Ole Becker	8 June 2000 (aged 22)	3	0	(German Football Association) 1899 Hoffenheim
8	MF	Yannik Keitel	15 February 2000 (aged 23)	12	0	(German Football Association) SC Freiburg
9	FW	**Kevin Schade**	27 November 2001 (aged 21)	5	4	(The Football Association) Brentford
10	MF	**Angelo Stiller**	4 April 2001 (aged 21)	14	1	(German Football Association) 1899 Hoffenheim
11	FW	**Youssoufa Moukoko**	20 November 2004 (aged 18)	5	6	(German Football Association) Borussia Dortmund
12	GK	Nico Mantl	6 February 2000 (aged 23)	4	0	(Austrian Football Association) Red Bull Salzburg
13	DF	Kilian Fischer	12 October 2000 (aged 22)	6	0	(German Football Association) VfL Wolfsburg
14	DF	Henning Matriciani	14 March 2000 (aged 22)	1	0	(German Football Association) Schalke 04
15	DF	Maximilian Bauer	9 February 2000 (aged 23)	7	0	(German Football Association) FC Augsburg
16	MF	Eric Martel	29 April 2002 (aged 20)	8	0	(German Football Association) 1. FC Köln
17	MF	Noah Weißhaupt	20 September 2001 (aged 21)	3	0	(German Football Association) SC Freiburg
18	MF	**Denis Huseinbašić** (Note: Capped for Bosnia and Herzegovina)	3 July 2001 (aged 21)	3	2	(German Football Association) 1. FC Köln
19	FW	Nelson Weiper	17 March 2005 (aged 17)	0	0	(German Football Association) Mainz 05
20	FW	Jessic Ngankam	20 July 2000 (aged 22)	2	1	(German Football Association) Hertha BSC
21	FW	Faride Alidou	18 July 2001 (aged 21)	8	0	(German Football Association) Eintracht Frankfurt
22	DF	Luca Netz	15 May 2003 (aged 19)	8	0	(German Football Association) Borussia Mönchengladbach
23	GK	Christian Früchtl	28 January 2000 (aged 23)	0	0	(Austrian Football Association) Austria Wien

=== Israel ===
The final squad was announced on 14 June 2023.

Head coach: Guy Luzon

No.	Pos.	Player	Date of birth (age)	Caps	Goals	Club
1	GK	**Daniel Peretz**	10 July 2000 (aged 22)	7	0	(Israel Football Association) Maccabi Tel Aviv
2	DF	Karem Jaber	31 October 2000 (aged 22)	12	0	(Israel Football Association) Maccabi Netanya
3	DF	Ziv Morgan	19 January 2000 (aged 23)	8	0	(Israel Football Association) Ironi Kiryat Shmona
4	DF	Or Blorian	7 March 2000 (aged 23)	17	0	(Israel Football Association) Hapoel Be'er Sheva
5	DF	Gil Cohen	8 November 2000 (aged 22)	21	0	(Israel Football Association) Ashdod
6	MF	**Omri Gandelman**	16 May 2000 (aged 23)	9	3	(Israel Football Association) Maccabi Netanya
7	MF	**Eden Kartsev**	11 April 2000 (aged 23)	16	2	(Turkish Football Federation) İstanbul Başakşehir
8	MF	Arad Bar	29 January 2000 (aged 23)	9	4	(Israel Football Association) Maccabi Petah Tikva
9	FW	**Idan Gorno**	9 August 2004 (aged 18)	2	1	(Israel Football Association) Maccabi Petah Tikva
10	MF	**Oscar Gloukh**	1 April 2004 (aged 19)	4	0	(Austrian Football Association) Red Bull Salzburg
11	FW	**Dor Turgeman**	24 October 2003 (aged 19)	2	0	(Israel Football Association) Maccabi Tel Aviv
12	DF	Roy Revivo	22 May 2003 (aged 20)	2	0	(Israel Football Association) Hapoel Jerusalem
13	FW	**Anan Khalaily**	3 September 2004 (aged 18)	0	0	(Israel Football Association) Maccabi Haifa
14	MF	Oz Bilu	16 January 2001 (aged 22)	7	1	(Israel Football Association) Maccabi Netanya
15	MF	Ethan Azoulay	26 May 2002 (aged 21)	6	0	(Israel Football Association) Maccabi Netanya
16	MF	**Yoav Hofmayster**	25 December 2000 (aged 22)	6	0	(Israel Football Association) Ironi Kiryat Shmona
17	MF	Ayano Preda	29 April 2002 (aged 21)	0	0	(Israel Football Association) Hapoel Jerusalem
18	GK	Shareef Kayouf	25 June 2001 (aged 21)	2	0	(Israel Football Association) Maccabi Haifa
19	FW	Mohammed Abu Rumi	1 March 2004 (aged 19)	0	0	(Israel Football Association) Ironi Kiryat Shmona
20	FW	Hisham Layous	13 November 2000 (aged 22)	5	0	(Israel Football Association) Hapoel Tel Aviv
21	DF	**Stav Lemkin**	2 April 2003 (aged 20)	6	1	(Israel Football Association) Hapoel Tel Aviv
22	DF	Ilay Hagag	7 November 2001 (aged 21)	4	0	(Israel Football Association) Hapoel Afula
23	GK	Tomer Tzarfati	16 October 2003 (aged 19)	0	0	(Israel Football Association) Maccabi Netanya

== Group D ==
=== France ===
The final squad was announced on 31 May 2023.

Head coach: Sylvain Ripoll

No.	Pos.	Player	Date of birth (age)	Caps	Goals	Club
1	GK	Illan Meslier	2 March 2000 (aged 23)	13	0	(The Football Association) Leeds United
2	DF	Mohamed Simakan	3 May 2000 (aged 23)	3	0	(German Football Association) RB Leipzig
3	DF	**Yasser Larouci** (Note: Capped for Algeria)	1 January 2001 (aged 22)	5	1	(French Football Federation) Troyes
4	DF	**Loïc Badé**	11 April 2000 (aged 23)	4	0	(Royal Spanish Football Federation) Sevilla
5	DF	Niels Nkounkou	1 November 2000 (aged 22)	3	0	(French Football Federation) Saint-Étienne
6	MF	Enzo Le Fée	3 February 2000 (aged 23)	12	3	(French Football Federation) Lorient
7	MF	**Manu Koné**	17 May 2001 (aged 22)	8	0	(German Football Association) Borussia Mönchengladbach
8	MF	Maxence Caqueret (captain)	15 February 2000 (aged 23)	20	3	(French Football Federation) Lyon
9	FW	Arnaud Kalimuendo	20 January 2002 (aged 21)	18	4	(French Football Federation) Rennes
10	FW	**Rayan Cherki**	17 August 2003 (aged 19)	10	4	(French Football Federation) Lyon
11	FW	**Amine Gouiri**	16 February 2000 (aged 23)	27	11	(French Football Federation) Rennes
12	DF	Valentin Gendrey	21 June 2000 (aged 23)	2	0	(Italian Football Federation) Lecce
13	MF	Joris Chotard	24 September 2001 (aged 21)	7	0	(French Football Federation) Montpellier
14	DF	**Castello Lukeba**	17 December 2002 (aged 20)	8	0	(French Football Federation) Lyon
15	FW	**Amine Adli** (Note: Capped for Morocco)	10 May 2000 (aged 23)	9	3	(German Football Association) Bayer Leverkusen
16	GK	**Lucas Chevalier**	6 November 2001 (aged 21)	2	0	(French Football Federation) Lille
17	FW	**Bradley Barcola**	2 September 2002 (aged 20)	3	0	(French Football Federation) Lyon
18	DF	Bafodé Diakité	6 January 2001 (aged 22)	2	0	(French Football Federation) Lille
19	MF	**Khéphren Thuram**	26 March 2001 (aged 22)	15	2	(French Football Federation) Nice
20	DF	**Pierre Kalulu**	5 June 2000 (aged 23)	16	2	(Italian Football Federation) Milan
21	FW	**Elye Wahi** (Note: Capped for Ivory Coast)	2 January 2003 (aged 20)	4	1	(French Football Federation) Montpellier
22	MF	**Michael Olise**	12 December 2001 (aged 21)	5	0	(The Football Association) Crystal Palace
23	GK	Stefan Bajic	23 December 2001 (aged 21)	1	0	(The Football Association) Bristol City

=== Italy ===
The final squad was announced on 13 June 2023.

Head coach: Paolo Nicolato

No.	Pos.	Player	Date of birth (age)	Caps	Goals	Club
1	GK	Marco Carnesecchi	1 July 2000 (aged 22)	19	0	(Italian Football Federation) Cremonese
2	DF	**Giorgio Scalvini**	11 December 2003 (aged 19)	3	0	(Italian Football Federation) Atalanta
3	DF	Fabiano Parisi	9 November 2000 (aged 22)	8	0	(Italian Football Federation) Empoli
4	MF	**Samuele Ricci**	21 August 2001 (aged 21)	14	1	(Italian Football Federation) Torino
5	DF	Lorenzo Pirola	20 February 2002 (aged 21)	10	1	(Italian Football Federation) Salernitana
6	DF	Matteo Lovato	14 February 2000 (aged 23)	13	1	(Italian Football Federation) Salernitana
7	MF	**Salvatore Esposito**	7 October 2000 (aged 22)	10	0	(Italian Football Federation) Spezia
8	MF	**Sandro Tonali** (captain)	8 May 2000 (aged 23)	11	0	(Italian Football Federation) Milan
9	FW	Lorenzo Colombo	8 March 2002 (aged 21)	16	4	(Italian Football Federation) Lecce
10	MF	**Nicolò Rovella**	4 December 2001 (aged 21)	18	3	(Italian Football Federation) Monza
11	FW	**Pietro Pellegri**	17 March 2001 (aged 22)	5	2	(Italian Football Federation) Torino
12	DF	**Raoul Bellanova**	17 May 2000 (aged 23)	18	0	(Italian Football Federation) Internazionale
13	DF	**Destiny Udogie**	28 November 2002 (aged 20)	7	0	(Italian Football Federation) Udinese
14	DF	Giorgio Cittadini	18 April 2002 (aged 21)	2	0	(Italian Football Federation) Modena
15	DF	Caleb Okoli	13 July 2001 (aged 21)	11	1	(Italian Football Federation) Atalanta
16	MF	Edoardo Bove	16 May 2002 (aged 21)	7	0	(Italian Football Federation) Roma
17	FW	**Wilfried Gnonto**	5 November 2003 (aged 19)	0	0	(The Football Association) Leeds United
18	FW	**Matteo Cancellieri**	12 February 2002 (aged 21)	9	4	(Italian Football Federation) Lazio
19	GK	Elia Caprile	25 August 2001 (aged 21)	2	0	(Italian Football Federation) Bari
20	DF	**Andrea Cambiaso**	20 February 2000 (aged 23)	7	0	(Italian Football Federation) Bologna
21	MF	**Fabio Miretti**	3 August 2003 (aged 19)	3	0	(Italian Football Federation) Juventus
22	GK	Stefano Turati	5 September 2001 (aged 21)	4	0	(Italian Football Federation) Frosinone
23	FW	**Nicolò Cambiaghi**	28 December 2000 (aged 22)	7	1	(Italian Football Federation) Empoli

=== Norway ===
The final squad was announced on 31 May 2023.

Head coach: Leif Gunnar Smerud

No.	Pos.	Player	Date of birth (age)	Caps	Goals	Club
1	GK	Mads Hedenstad Christiansen	21 October 2000 (aged 22)	3	0	(Norwegian Football Federation) Lillestrøm
2	DF	Sebastian Sebulonsen	27 January 2000 (aged 23)	16	1	(Danish Football Association) Brøndby
3	DF	Henrik Heggheim	22 April 2001 (aged 22)	15	0	(Norwegian Football Federation) Vålerenga
4	DF	Jesper Daland	6 January 2000 (aged 23)	15	1	(Royal Belgian Football Association) Cercle Brugge
5	DF	**David Møller Wolfe**	23 April 2002 (aged 21)	1	0	(Norwegian Football Federation) Brann
6	MF	Sivert Mannsverk	8 May 2002 (aged 21)	4	0	(Norwegian Football Federation) Molde
7	MF	Joshua Kitolano	3 August 2001 (aged 21)	6	0	(Royal Dutch Football Association) Sparta Rotterdam
8	MF	Johan Hove	7 September 2000 (aged 22)	21	2	(Royal Dutch Football Association) Groningen
9	FW	Seedy Jatta	18 March 2003 (aged 20)	2	0	(Norwegian Football Federation) Vålerenga
10	FW	**Oscar Bobb**	12 July 2003 (aged 19)	3	1	(The Football Association) Manchester City
11	FW	Emil Konradsen Ceïde	3 September 2001 (aged 21)	11	4	(Italian Football Federation) Sassuolo
12	GK	Kristoffer Klaesson	27 November 2000 (aged 22)	18	0	(The Football Association) Leeds United
13	DF	Leo Hjelde	26 August 2003 (aged 19)	7	0	(The Football Association) Rotherham United
14	MF	**Osame Sahraoui**	11 June 2001 (aged 22)	10	2	(Royal Dutch Football Association) Heerenveen
15	DF	**Colin Rösler**	22 April 2000 (aged 23)	4	0	(Swedish Football Association) Mjällby
16	MF	**Håkon Evjen**	14 February 2000 (aged 23)	20	1	(Danish Football Association) Brøndby
17	FW	**Antonio Nusa**	17 April 2005 (aged 18)	0	0	(Royal Belgian Football Association) Club Brugge
18	MF	**Markus Solbakken**	25 July 2000 (aged 22)	7	0	(Norwegian Football Federation) Viking
19	DF	Warren Kamanzi	11 November 2000 (aged 22)	2	0	(French Football Federation) Toulouse
20	FW	**Erik Botheim** (captain)	10 January 2000 (aged 23)	14	3	(Italian Football Federation) Salernitana
21	MF	Tobias Christensen	11 May 2000 (aged 23)	17	4	(Hungarian Football Federation) Fehérvár
22	MF	**Christos Zafeiris** (Note: Capped for Greece)	23 February 2003 (aged 20)	5	0	(Football Association of the Czech Republic) Slavia Prague
23	GK	Rasmus Sandberg	23 April 2001 (aged 22)	0	0	(Norwegian Football Federation) Stjørdals-Blink

=== Switzerland ===
The final squad was announced on 15 June 2023.

Head coach: Patrick Rahmen

No.	Pos.	Player	Date of birth (age)	Caps	Goals	Club
1	GK	**Amir Saipi** (Note: Capped for Kosovo)	8 July 2000 (aged 22)	10	0	(Swiss Football Association) Lugano
2	DF	Lewin Blum	27 July 2001 (aged 21)	7	0	(Swiss Football Association) Young Boys
3	DF	Nicolas Vouilloz	11 May 2001 (aged 22)	7	0	(Swiss Football Association) Servette
4	DF	**Leonidas Stergiou** (captain)	3 March 2002 (aged 21)	14	1	(Swiss Football Association) St. Gallen
5	DF	Marco Burch	19 October 2000 (aged 22)	11	1	(Swiss Football Association) Luzern
6	FW	**Simon Sohm**	11 April 2001 (aged 22)	18	0	(Italian Football Federation) Parma
7	FW	**Dan Ndoye**	25 October 2000 (aged 22)	22	8	(Swiss Football Association) Basel
8	MF	**Ardon Jashari**	30 July 2002 (aged 20)	3	0	(Swiss Football Association) Luzern
9	FW	Filip Stojilković	4 January 2000 (aged 23)	22	2	(German Football Association) Darmstadt 98
10	MF	**Kastriot Imeri**	27 June 2000 (aged 22)	20	7	(Swiss Football Association) Young Boys
11	FW	Julian von Moos	11 April 2001 (aged 22)	4	1	(Swiss Football Association) St. Gallen
12	GK	Nicholas Ammeter	11 December 2000 (aged 22)	0	0	(Swiss Football Association) Wil
13	DF	**Aurèle Amenda**	31 July 2003 (aged 19)	1	0	(Swiss Football Association) Young Boys
14	MF	Matteo Di Giusto	18 August 2000 (aged 22)	7	0	(Swiss Football Association) Winterthur
15	MF	Gabriel Barès	29 August 2000 (aged 22)	12	2	(Swiss Football Association) Thun
16	DF	Serge Müller	18 September 2000 (aged 22)	5	0	(Swiss Football Association) Schaffhausen
17	DF	Jan Kronig	24 June 2000 (aged 22)	12	1	(Swiss Football Association) Aarau
18	MF	**Bledian Krasniqi**	17 June 2001 (aged 22)	5	0	(Swiss Football Association) Zürich
19	MF	Darian Males	3 May 2001 (aged 22)	13	0	(Swiss Football Association) Basel
20	DF	**Bećir Omeragić**	20 January 2002 (aged 21)	6	0	(Swiss Football Association) Zürich
21	GK	Marvin Keller	3 July 2002 (aged 20)	2	0	(Swiss Football Association) Young Boys
22	FW	**Fabian Rieder**	16 February 2002 (aged 21)	11	2	(Swiss Football Association) Young Boys
23	FW	**Zeki Amdouni**	4 December 2000 (aged 22)	11	7	(Swiss Football Association) Basel
