= Mamadou Tounkara =

Mamadou Tounkara may refer to:

- Mamadou Tounkara (footballer, born 1996), Spanish football forward for Avellino
- Mamadou Tounkara (footballer, born 2001), Malian football centre-back for Vitória Guimarães
