= Miguel Maga (footballer, born 2002) =

Portuguese footballer

Maga
Personal information
- Full name: Miguel Ângelo Gomes Ferreira Magalhães
- Date of birth: 16 November 2002 (age 23)
- Place of birth: Porto, Portugal
- Height: 1.75 m (5 ft 9 in)
- Position: Right-back

Team information
- Current team: Vitória Guimarães
- Number: 2

Youth career
- 2010–2013: Porto
- 2013–2017: Rio Ave
- 2017–2018: Padroense
- 2018–2019: Rio Ave
- 2019–2021: Vitória Guimarães

Senior career*
Years	Team	Apps	(Gls)
2021–2022	Vitória Guimarães B	22	(1)
2022–	Vitória Guimarães	101	(0)

International career
2022	Portugal U20	3	(0)
- * Club domestic league appearances and goals as of 16:02, 15 August 2026 (UTC)

Miguel Ângelo Gomes Ferreira Magalhães (born 16 November 2002), known as Maga, is a Portuguese professional footballer who plays as a right-back for Primeira Liga club Vitória de Guimarães.

== Club career ==
Born in Porto, Maga played youth football for four clubs, starting out at FC Porto and finishing his development at Vitória de Guimarães. On 21 April 2022, he signed a professional contract with the latter until 2025.

Maga made his competitive debut on 30 January 2022, in a 3–2 Primeira Liga away loss against F.C. Vizela. He scored his first goal on 4 August, opening an eventual 3–1 loss at HNK Hajduk Split in the third qualifying round of the UEFA Europa Conference League also as a starter.

== International career ==
Maga represented Portugal at under-20 level. He won his first cap on 24 March 2022, in the 3–0 friendly win over the Czech Republic.

== Career statistics ==
As of match played 16 May 2026

Club	Season	League			National cup		League cup		Continental		Other		Total	
Club	Season	Division	Apps	Goals	Apps	Goals	Apps	Goals	Apps	Goals	Apps	Goals	Apps	Goals
Vitória Guimarães	2021–22	Primeira Liga	13	0	0	0	0	0	—		—		13	0
Vitória Guimarães	2022–23	Primeira Liga	24	0	1	0	1	0	4 (Note: Appearances in UEFA Europa Conference League)	1	—		30	1
Vitória Guimarães	2023–24	Primeira Liga	22	0	4	1	1	0	2	0	—		29	1
Vitória Guimarães	2024–25	Primeira Liga	18	0	1	0	0	0	6	0	—		25	0
Vitória Guimarães	2025–26	Primeira Liga	22	0	2	0	0	0	—		—		24	0
Career total			99	0	8	1	2	0	12	1	—		121	2

== Honours ==
Vitória Guimarães

- Taça da Liga: 2025–26
