= Jota Silva =

Portuguese footballer

Personal information
- Full name: João Pedro Ferreira da Silva
- Date of birth: 1 August 1999 (age 27)
- Place of birth: Melres, Portugal
- Height: 1.79 m (5 ft 10 in)
- Position: Winger

Team information
- Current team: Olympiacos
- Number: 20

Youth career
- 2010–2017: Sousense
- 2017–2018: Paços Ferreira

Senior career*
Years	Team	Apps	(Gls)
2017	Sousense	1	(0)
2017–2018	Paços Ferreira B	2	(0)
2018–2019	Sousense	34	(16)
2019–2020	Espinho	25	(14)
2020–2021	Leixões	10	(2)
2021–2022	Casa Pia	50	(13)
2022–2024	Vitória Guimarães	63	(13)
2024–2026	Nottingham Forest	32	(3)
2025–2026	→ Beşiktaş (loan)	18	(5)
2026	→ Olympiacos (loan)	1	(0)
2026–	Olympiacos	10	(6)

International career
2024	Portugal	2	(0)
- * Club domestic league appearances and goals as of 20:43, 22 November 2026 (UTC)

João Pedro Ferreira da Silva (born 1 August 1999), known as Jota Silva, is a Portuguese professional footballer who plays as a winger for Super League Greece club Olympiacos.

== Club career ==
=== Early career ===
Silva was born in Melres, Gondomar, Porto District. He started his senior career in the third division, with Sousense and Espinho.

On 7 July 2020, Silva signed a three-year contract with LigaPro club Leixões. He made his professional debut on 13 September, starting in a 2–2 home draw against Casa Pia. His first goals came on 16 October, a brace in the 3–1 win over Varzim also at the Estádio do Mar.

=== Casa Pia ===
Late in the 2021 January transfer window, Silva joined Casa Pia of the same league until June 2023 after severing his ties to Leixões. In the 2021–22 season, he scored 11 times to help his team return to the Primeira Liga after 83 years, being included in the Team of the Year in the process.

=== Vitória Guimarães ===
On 1 June 2022, Silva agreed to a three-year deal with Vitória de Guimarães on a free transfer. The following day, Casa Pia claimed that he was under contract with them until 2023, rejecting its termination and considering legal action against Vitória; a settlement was eventually reached, with the latter paying the former €190,000 for 50% of his economic rights while also reserving another 20% for a fee of €100,000.

Silva's top-flight debut took place on 7 August 2022, in a 1–0 away defeat of Chaves. He scored his first goal 14 days later, in the 2–1 loss at Portimonense. He also found the net in the reverse fixture between the sides, a 1–0 home victory.

On 27 July 2023, Silva scored his first goal in Europe, in a 4–3 victory over Celje in the second qualifying round of the UEFA Conference League. The following March, he netted in five consecutive matches, leading him to be named both the league's Player and Forward of the Month. He scored 15 times in all competitions during the campaign, adding seven assists in a Conference League qualification.

=== Nottingham Forest ===
On 1 August 2024, Silva signed a four-year contract with Nottingham Forest for an undisclosed transfer fee, reported to be €7 million. He made his Premier League debut on 24 August, as an injury-time substitute in the 1–0 win at Southampton. In his first start, four days later, he scored in a 1–1 home draw against Newcastle United in the second round of the EFL Cup, in an eventual penalty shootout loss.

Silva scored his first league goal on 1 February 2025, in a 7–0 victory over Brighton & Hove Albion. On 5 April, after finding the net in the 2–1 loss away to Aston Villa, his third goal in four appearances from the bench equalled Jason Lee's 1995 record.

On 12 September 2025, Silva joined Süper Lig club Beşiktaş on a season-long loan with an option to buy.

=== Olympiacos ===
In July 2026, on a similar temporary deal, Silva moved to Olympiacos. He agreed to a permanent transfer one month later, scoring twice in his first three Super League Greece appearances.

== International career ==
Silva was never capped by Portugal at any youth level. On 15 March 2024, he was called to the senior squad by manager Roberto Martínez for friendlies with Sweden and Slovenia. He made his debut six days later against the former, coming on as a 62nd-minute substitute for Matheus Nunes in a 5–2 win in Guimarães.

== Career statistics ==
=== Club ===
As of match played 22 August 2026

Appearances and goals by club, season and competition
Club	Season	League			National cup (Note: Includes Taça de Portugal, FA Cup, Turkish Cup)		League cup (Note: Includes Taça da Liga, EFL Cup)		Europe		Total	
Club	Season	Division	Apps	Goals	Apps	Goals	Apps	Goals	Apps	Goals	Apps	Goals
Sousense	2016–17	Campeonato de Portugal	1	0	0	0	—		—		1	0
Espinho	2019–20	Campeonato de Portugal	25	14	5	1	—		—		30	15
Leixões	2020–21	Liga Portugal 2	10	2	2	0	—		—		12	2
Casa Pia	2020–21	Liga Portugal 2	17	2	0	0	—		—		17	2
Casa Pia	2021–22	Liga Portugal 2	33	11	4	3	2	0	—		39	14
Casa Pia	Total		50	13	4	3	2	0	—		56	16
Vitória Guimarães	2022–23	Primeira Liga	30	2	3	1	3	1	4 (Note: Appearances in UEFA Conference League)	0	40	4
Vitória Guimarães	2023–24	Primeira Liga	33	11	6	3	1	0	2	1	42	15
Vitória Guimarães	2024–25	Primeira Liga	—		—		—		1	1	1	1
Vitória Guimarães	Total		63	13	9	4	4	1	7	2	83	20
Nottingham Forest	2024–25	Premier League	31	3	5	0	1	1	—		37	4
Nottingham Forest	2025–26	Premier League	1	0	—		—		—		1	0
Nottingham Forest	Total		32	3	5	0	1	1	—		38	4
Beşiktaş (loan)	2025–26	Süper Lig	18	5	4	0	—		—		22	5
Olympiacos (loan)	2026–27	Super League Greece	1	0	0	0	—		2 (Note: Appearances in UEFA Champions League)	0	3	2
Career total			200	50	29	8	7	2	9	2	245	62

== Honours ==
Individual

- Primeira Liga Team of the Year: 2023–24
- Liga Portugal 2 Team of the Season: 2021–22
