= Alisson Safira =

Brazilian footballer

Personal information
- Full name: Alisson Pelegrini Safira
- Date of birth: 17 March 1995 (age 31)
- Place of birth: Terra Boa, Brazil
- Height: 1.85 m (6 ft 1 in)
- Position: Forward

Team information
- Current team: Juventude
- Number: 25

Youth career
- –2012: Toledo
- 2013–2014: Benevento
- 2014–2015: Foz do Iguaçu

Senior career*
Years	Team	Apps	(Gls)
2016	Foz do Iguaçu	0	(0)
2016	→ Londrina (loan)	19	(2)
2017–2021	Londrina	75	(14)
2017	→ Almirante Barroso (loan)	0	(0)
2018	→ Novorizontino (loan)	0	(0)
2019	→ CSA (loan)	7	(0)
2020	→ Ponte Preta (loan)	0	(0)
2020	→ CRB (loan)	12	(1)
2021–2022	Belenenses SAD	28	(10)
2022–2024	Vitória Guimarães	30	(6)
2024–2026	Santa Clara	34	(8)
2025	→ Universitatea Craiova (loan)	16	(1)
2025	→ Cuiabá (loan)	22	(10)
2026–	Juventude	45	(8)
- * Club domestic league appearances and goals as of 16 November 2026

Alisson Pelegrini Safira (born 17 March 1995) is a Brazilian professional footballer who plays as a forward for Campeonato Brasileiro Série B club Juventude.

== Career ==
Safira was born in Brazil to Italian and Malagasy roots. On 8 January 2024, Safira left Primeira Liga club Vitória de Guimarães and dropped down to the Liga Portugal 2, signing a two-and-a-half-year contract with Santa Clara.

After scoring 8 goals in 39 appearances for the Azorean club, in January 2025 he was sent on loan to Romania, joining Liga I side Universitatea Craiova until June. He was immediately sent on another loan, this time back to Brazil, joining Campeonato Brasileiro Série B club Cuiabá until the end of the 2025 season.

On 26 December 2025, Safira returned to Brazil on a permanent basis, signing a two-year contract with Série B side Juventude.

== Career statistics ==
As of match played 24 May 2025

Appearances and goals by club, season and competition
Club	Season	League			State league		Cup		Continental		Other		Total	
Club	Season	Division	Apps	Goals	Apps	Goals	Apps	Goals	Apps	Goals	Apps	Goals	Apps	Goals
Foz do Iguaçu	2016	Paranaense	—		10 (Note: Appearances in Campeonato Paranaense)	5	—		—		—		10	5
Londrina (loan)	2016	Série B	19	2	—		—		—		—		19	2
Londrina	2017	Série B	24	2	7	1	1	1	—		6 (Note: Appearances in Primeira Liga)	2	38	6
Londrina	2018	Série B	17	3	0	0	0	0	—		—		17	3
Londrina	2019	Série B	19	6	0	0	2	0	—		—		21	6
Londrina	2021	Série B	15	3	12	5	0	0	—		—		27	8
Londrina	Total		94	16	29	6	3	1	—		—		126	23
Almirante Barroso (loan)	2017	Catarinense	—		17 (Note: Appearances in Campeonato Catarinense)	3	—		—		—		17	3
Novorizontino (loan)	2018	Série D	—		12 (Note: Appearances in Campeonato Paulista)	4	—		—		—		12	4
CSA (loan)	2019	Série A	7	0	0	0	0	0	—		—		7	0
Ponte Preta (loan)	2020	Série B	—		10	1	2	0	—		—		12	1
CRB (loan)	2020	Série B	12	1	0	0	0	0	—		—		12	1
Belenenses SAD	2021–22	Primeira Liga	24	7	—		2	0	—		—		26	7
Belenenses SAD	2022–23	Liga Portugal 2	4	3	—		—		—		—		4	3
Belenenses SAD	Total		28	10	—		2	0	—		—		30	10
Vitória Guimarães	2022–23	Primeira Liga	22	5	—		3	1	—		3 (Note: Appearances in Taça da Liga)	0	28	6
Vitória Guimarães	2023–24	Primeira Liga	8	1	—		1	0	1 (Note: Appearances in UEFA Conference League)	0	1	0	11	1
Vitória Guimarães	Total		30	6	—		4	1	1	0	4	0	39	7
Santa Clara	2023–24	Liga Portugal 2	18	6	—		2	0	—		—		20	6
Santa Clara	2024–25	Primeira Liga	16	2	—		2	0	—		1	0	19	2
Santa Clara	Total		34	8	—		4	0	—		1	0	39	8
Universitatea Craiova (loan)	2024–25	Liga I	16	1	—		0	0	—		—		16	1
Career total			222	43	51	17	16	2	1	0	11	2	301	63

== Honours ==
Londrina

- Primeira Liga: 2017

Santa Clara

- Liga Portugal 2: 2023–24
