= Ibrahima Bamba =

Italian footballer (born 2002)

Personal information
- Full name: Ibrahima Kader Ariel Bamba
- Date of birth: 22 April 2002 (age 24)
- Place of birth: Vercelli, Italy
- Height: 1.84 m (6 ft 0 in)
- Positions: Centre-back; defensive midfielder

Youth career
- 2015–2020: Pro Vercelli

Senior career*
Years	Team	Apps	(Gls)
2020–2022	Vitória de Guimarães B	23	(1)
2022–2023	Vitória de Guimarães	35	(0)
2023–2026	Al-Duhail	53	(1)
- * Club domestic league appearances and goals as of 26 June 2026

Ibrahima Kader Ariel Bamba (born 22 April 2002) is an Italian professional footballer who plays as a centre-back or defensive midfielder.

== Club career ==
=== Early career ===
Born in Italy to Ivorian parents, Bamba began playing football with the youth academy of Pro Vercelli at the age of 14 in 2015.

=== Vitória de Guimarães ===
He moved to Portuguese club Vitória de Guimarães in 2020. On 26 January 2022, Bamba signed a professional contract with Vitória, keeping him at the club until 2025 with a €30m release clause. He made his professional debut with Vitória in a 3–0 Primeira Liga loss to Benfica on 27 February 2022.

=== Al-Duhail ===
On 13 July 2023, Vitória de Guimarães announced the sale of Bamba to Qatari Stars League side Al-Duhail, with the player signing an unspecified "long-term contract" for the Middle Eastern club. The transfer fee was reported to be around €9 million.

== International career ==
On 24 May 2022, Italy national football team manager Roberto Mancini called Bamba to join a 53-player training camp for the Azzurri.

== Career statistics ==
As of match played 28 April 2024

Appearances and goals by club, season and competition
Club	Season	League			National cup (Note: Includes Taça de Portugal)		League cup (Note: Includes Taça da Liga)		Continental		Total	
Club	Season	Division	Apps	Goals	Apps	Goals	Apps	Goals	Apps	Goals	Apps	Goals
Vitória SC B	2020–21	Campeonato de Portugal	16	1	–		–		–		16	1
Vitória SC B	2021–22	Liga 3	7	0	–		–		–		7	0
Vitória SC B	Total		23	1	–		–		–		23	1
Vitória SC	2021–22	Primeira Liga	7	0	0	0	0	0	–		7	0
Vitória SC	2022–23	Primeira Liga	28	0	3	0	3	0	1 (Note: Appearance in UEFA Europa Conference League)	0	35	0
Vitória SC	Total		35	0	3	0	3	0	1	0	42	0
Al-Duhail	2023–24	Qatar Stars League	17	0	0	0	0	0	6 (Note: Appearances in AFC Champions League)	0	23	0
Career Total			75	1	3	0	3	0	7	0	88	1
