= Tiago Silva (footballer, born 1993) =

Portuguese footballer

Personal information
- Full name: Tiago Rafael Maia da Silva
- Date of birth: 2 June 1993 (age 33)
- Place of birth: Lisbon, Portugal
- Height: 1.70 m (5 ft 7 in)
- Position: Central midfielder

Team information
- Current team: Al-Shamal
- Number: 70

Youth career
- 2002–2004: Olivais
- 2004–2009: Benfica
- 2009–2012: Belenenses

Senior career*
| Years | Team | Apps | (Gls) |
| 2012–2018 | Belenenses | 98 | (8) |
| 2016–2018 | → Feirense (loan) | 56 | (9) |
| 2018–2019 | Feirense | 29 | (3) |
| 2019–2020 | Nottingham Forest | 44 | (3) |
| 2020–2021 | Olympiacos | 16 | (0) |
| 2021–2025 | Vitória Guimarães | 120 | (19) |
| 2025–2026 | Al-Rayyan | 18 | (1) |
| 2026– | Al-Shamal | 6 | (1) |

International career
| 2013 | Portugal U20 | 8 | (0) |
| 2013–2014 | Portugal U21 | 5 | (0) |
| 2016 | Portugal U23 | 3 | (0) |
- * Club domestic league appearances and goals as of 04:18, 7 November 2026 (UTC)

Tiago Rafael Maia da Silva (born 2 June 1993) is a Portuguese professional footballer who plays for Qatar Stars League club Al-Shamal as a central midfielder.

He made 266 Primeira Liga appearances for Belenenses, Feirense and Vitória de Guimarães. Abroad, he won the Super League Greece for Olympiacos and played in the EFL Championship for Nottingham Forest.

Silva was part of the Portugal squad at the 2016 Summer Olympics.

== Club career ==
=== Belenenses ===
Born in Lisbon, Silva joined local C.F. Os Belenenses' youth system at the age of 16, from S.L. Benfica. He made his senior debut on 29 July 2012, playing the full 90 minutes in a 1–1 home draw against U.D. Oliveirense in the first round of the Taça da Liga. His first match in the Segunda Liga occurred on 11 August, a 3–1 home win over C.D. Feirense where he also started.

Silva ultimately contributed 37 games and four goals as the Estádio do Restelo club returned to the Primeira Liga after a three-year absence. He made his debut in the Portuguese top flight on 18 August 2013, being booked in the 0–3 home loss to Rio Ave FC.

=== Feirense ===
From 2016 to 2018, Silva played with Feirense of the same league on loan. He scored six and three goals in each season, respectively, and on 18 February 2018 the move was made permanent as the player signed a three-year contract.

=== Nottingham Forest ===
On 5 July 2019, Silva joined English side Nottingham Forest on a two-year deal. His maiden appearance in the EFL Championship took place on 3 August, when he played 62 minutes of a 1–2 home defeat against West Bromwich Albion. He scored his first goal ten days later, the only in the first round of the EFL Cup at home to Fleetwood Town.

=== Olympiacos ===
Silva agreed to a contract at Olympiacos F.C. on 3 October 2020, for an undisclosed fee. He played 21 competitive matches during his spell, including 16 in the Super League Greece for the champions.

=== Vitória Guimarães ===
On 7 August 2021, Silva returned to his country and moved to Vitória de Guimarães; the five-year deal included a €50 million buyout clause, while Olympiacos remained entitled to 50% of the player's rights regarding a future sale. He scored his first European goal the following 21 July in the second qualifying round of the UEFA Europa Conference League at home to Puskás Akadémia FC, a 3–0 win. In the next round, he was sent off in a 1–0 victory over HNK Hajduk Split that nonetheless saw his team eliminated.

Silva scored from a direct corner kick to equalise an eventual 2–1 home win against Gil Vicente F.C. on 19 August 2023. The goal was later voted as the best for that month by the Liga Portuguesa de Futebol Profissional.

Over five seasons at the Estádio D. Afonso Henriques, Silva totalled 155 games, 24 goals – 15 being from an attempted 16 penalties – and 19 assists. In 2024–25, he was included in the Team of the Year.

=== Later career ===
Silva moved abroad again in summer 2025, with the 32-year-old joining Al-Rayyan SC. On 4 September 2026, he agreed to a contract at fellow Qatar Stars League club Al-Shamal SC.

== International career ==
Silva won the first of his five caps for Portugal at under-21 level on 14 August 2013, featuring 31 minutes in a 5–2 friendly win over Switzerland. He was also picked by manager Rui Jorge for his squad that appeared at the 2016 Summer Olympics, playing three matches in Rio de Janeiro in an eventual quarter-final exit.

== Career statistics ==
As of match played 18 May 2024

Appearances and goals by club, season and competition
| Club | Season | League | | | National cup | | League cup | | Continental | | Total | |
| Club | Season | Division | Apps | Goals | Apps | Goals | Apps | Goals | Apps | Goals | Apps | Goals |
|---|---|---|---|---|---|---|---|---|---|---|---|---|
| Belenenses | 2012–13 | Segunda Liga | 37 | 4 | 7 | 2 | 3 | 1 | — | | 47 | 7 |
| Belenenses | 2013–14 | Primeira Liga | 24 | 1 | 0 | 0 | 3 | 0 | — | | 27 | 1 |
| Belenenses | 2014–15 | Primeira Liga | 20 | 1 | 3 | 1 | 5 | 0 | — | | 28 | 2 |
| Belenenses | 2015–16 | Primeira Liga | 17 | 2 | 2 | 0 | 4 | 2 | 7 (Note: Appearances in UEFA Europa League) | 0 | 30 | 4 |
| Belenenses | Total | | 98 | 8 | 12 | 3 | 15 | 3 | 7 | 0 | 132 | 14 |
| Feirense (loan) | 2016–17 | Primeira Liga | 27 | 6 | 1 | 0 | 0 | 0 | — | | 28 | 6 |
| Feirense (loan) | 2017–18 | Primeira Liga | 29 | 3 | 2 | 0 | 3 | 0 | — | | 34 | 3 |
| Feirense | 2018–19 | Primeira Liga | 29 | 3 | 2 | 1 | 4 | 1 | — | | 35 | 5 |
| Feirense | Total | | 85 | 12 | 5 | 1 | 7 | 1 | — | | 97 | 14 |
| Nottingham Forest | 2019–20 | Championship | 44 | 3 | 0 | 0 | 3 | 1 | — | | 47 | 4 |
| Olympiacos | 2020–21 | Super League Greece | 16 | 0 | 5 | 0 | — | | 0 | 0 | 21 | 0 |
| Vitória Guimarães | 2021–22 | Primeira Liga | 29 | 3 | 2 | 0 | 1 | 0 | — | | 32 | 3 |
| Vitória Guimarães | 2022–23 | Primeira Liga | 28 | 5 | 2 | 0 | 2 | 0 | 4 (Note: Appearances in UEFA Europa Conference League) | 1 | 36 | 6 |
| Vitória Guimarães | 2023–24 | Primeira Liga | 29 | 5 | 6 | 2 | 1 | 0 | 1 | 0 | 37 | 7 |
| Vitória Guimarães | Total | | 86 | 13 | 10 | 2 | 4 | 0 | 5 | 1 | 105 | 16 |
| Career total | | | 329 | 36 | 32 | 6 | 29 | 5 | 12 | 1 | 402 | 48 |

== Honours ==
Belenenses

- Segunda Liga: 2012–13

Olympiacos

- Super League Greece: 2020–21

Individual

- Primeira Liga Team of the Year: 2024–25
