= Matouš Trmal =

Czech footballer

Personal information
- Full name: Matouš Trmal
- Date of birth: 2 October 1998 (age 28)
- Place of birth: Tasovice, Czech Republic
- Height: 1.91 m (6 ft 3 in)
- Position: Goalkeeper

Team information
- Current team: Teplice
- Number: 29

Youth career
- 2001−2009: Sokol Tasovice
- 2009−2014: Znojmo
- 2014−2018: Slovácko

Senior career*
Years	Team	Apps	(Gls)
2018−2020	Slovácko	50	(0)
2020−2023	Vitória Guimarães	12	(0)
2022−2023	→ Marítimo (loan)	6	(0)
2023−2025	Mladá Boleslav	44	(0)
2025	→ Teplice (loan)	11	(0)
2025−	Teplice	34	(0)

International career
2019−2020	Czech Republic U21	5	(0)
- * Club domestic league appearances and goals as of 27 May 2026

Matouš Trmal (born 2 October 1998) is a Czech professional footballer who plays as a goalkeeper for Czech First League club Teplice.

== Professional career ==
Trmal joined the youth academy of Slovácko in 2014 at the age of 16. Trmal made his professional debut with Slovácko in a 2–1 Czech First League loss to FC Viktoria Plzeň on 28 October 2018. On 31 July 2020, Trmal signed a contract with Vitória Guimarães. On 7 July 2023 Trmal signed a three-year contract with Mladá Boleslav.

On 21 February 2025, Trmal joined Teplice on a half-year loan deal.

On 16 June 2025, Trmal signed a contract with Teplice.

== Personal life ==
His girlfriend is Czech actress Anastasia Chocholatá, who gave birth to their first child, a son named Christian, in October 2022.
