= Hélder Sá =

Portuguese footballer

Personal information
- Full name: Hélder José Oliveira Sá
- Date of birth: 10 November 2002 (age 24)
- Place of birth: Vila Nova de Famalicão, Portugal
- Height: 1.87 m (6 ft 2 in)
- Position: Left-back

Team information
- Current team: União de Santarém
- Number: 55

Youth career
- 2011–2012: Benfica Famalicão
- 2012–2013: Operário Famalicão
- 2013–2015: Benfica Famalicão
- 2015–2021: Vitória Guimarães

Senior career*
| Years | Team | Apps | (Gls) |
| 2021–2024 | Vitória Guimarães B | 19 | (1) |
| 2021–2024 | Vitória Guimarães | 21 | (0) |
| 2023–2024 | → Radomiak Radom (loan) | 0 | (0) |
| 2024–2026 | Rio Ave | 4 | (0) |
| 2024 | → Feirense (loan) | 11 | (0) |
| 2026 | Sertãozinho | | |
| 2026– | União de Santarém | 1 | (0) |

International career
| 2019 | Portugal U18 | 1 | (0) |
| 2021–2022 | Portugal U20 | 6 | (0) |
- * Club domestic league appearances and goals as of 12 September 2026

Hélder José Oliveira Sá (born 10 November 2002) is a Portuguese professional footballer who plays as a left-back for Liga 3 club União de Santarém.

== Club career ==
Born in Vila Nova de Famalicão, Braga District, Sá joined Vitória de Guimarães aged 12. In May 2020, he signed a three-year professional contract with a €30 million buyout clause. The following 4 April, he made his debut in the Primeira Liga, playing 90 minutes in a 2–1 home loss against C.D. Tondela.

On 2 July 2023, Sá joined Ekstraklasa club Radomiak Radom on a one-year loan. He made his sole appearance on 27 September, in a 2–1 defeat to amateurs Garbarnia Kraków in the first round of the Polish Cup. In January 2024, the move was cancelled.

Sá agreed to a four-and-a-half-year deal with fellow Portuguese top-division side Rio Ave F.C. on 10 January 2024. He spent the first half of the 2024–25 season on loan at C.D. Feirense in the Liga Portugal 2.

On 19 January 2026, Sá left Rio Ave and moved to Brazil with Sertãozinho Futebol Clube.

== International career ==
Sá represented Portugal at under-18 and under-20 levels.
