= Zé Carlos (footballer, born 2001) =

Portuguese footballer

Personal information
- Full name: José Carlos Natário Ferreira
- Date of birth: 30 October 2001 (age 25)
- Place of birth: Matosinhos, Portugal
- Height: 1.81 m (5 ft 11 in)
- Positions: Midfielder; right-back

Team information
- Current team: Gil Vicente
- Number: 6

Youth career
- 2009–2012: SC Senhora da Hora
- 2012–2013: CD Torrão
- 2013–2014: Salgueiros
- 2014–2017: Rio Ave
- 2017–2019: Famalicão
- 2019–2021: Varzim

Senior career*
Years	Team	Apps	(Gls)
2021–2023	Varzim	22	(1)
2022–2023	→ Vitória Guimarães (loan)	15	(0)
2023–2025	Vitória Guimarães	30	(0)
2025	→ Farense (loan)	9	(0)
2025–	Gil Vicente	30	(0)

International career^{‡}
2022–2023	Portugal U21	10	(0)
- * Club domestic league appearances and goals as of 25 May 2026 ‡ National team caps and goals as of 00:01, 9 November 2025 (UTC)

José Carlos Natário Ferreira (born 30 October 2001), better known as Zé Carlos, is a Portuguese professional footballer who plays as a midfielder or right-back for Primeira Liga club Gil Vicente.

== Club career ==
Zé Carlos is a youth product of the Portuguese clubs SC Senhora da Hora, CD Torrão, Salgueiros, Rio Ave, Famalicão, and Varzim. He began his senior career with Varzim in the Liga Portugal 2 for the 2021–22 season. On 26 August 2022, he joined Vitória SC on loan in the Primeira Liga with an option to buy. On 2 May 2023, Vitória announced the triggering of the clause, which saw Zé Carlos joining the club on a permanent basis, signing a four-year deal.

On 31 January 2025, he was sent on loan to fellow Primeira Liga side Farense until the end of the season.

In the summer of 2025, Zé Carlos was transferred to Primeira Liga club Gil Vicente, with Vitória de Guimarães keeping 50% of his economic rights.

== International career ==
Zé Carlos is a youth international for Portugal, having been called up to the Portugal U21s in 2022.

== Career statistics ==
=== Club ===
As of match played 3 November 2025

Appearances and goals by club, season and competition
Club	Season	League			National cup		League cup		Continental		Total	
Club	Season	Division	Apps	Goals	Apps	Goals	Apps	Goals	Apps	Goals	Apps	Goals
Varzim	2021–22	Liga Portugal 2	22	1	3	0	0	0	—		25	1
Vitória SC (loan)	2022–23	Primeira Liga	15	0	2	0	2	0	0	0	19	0
Vitória SC	2023–24	Primeira Liga	23	0	2	0	1	0	2 (Note: Appearances in UEFA Europa Conference League)	0	28	0
Vitória SC	2024–25	Primeira Liga	7	0	1	0	0	0	8	0	16	0
Vitória SC	Total		30	0	3	0	1	0	10	0	44	0
Farense (loan)	2024–25	Primeira Liga	9	0	0	0	—		—		9	0
Gil Vicente	2025–26	Primeira Liga	10	0	1	0	—		—		11	0
Career total			86	1	9	0	3	0	10	0	108	1
