= Afonso Freitas =

Portuguese footballer

Personal information
- Full name: Afonso Manuel Abreu de Freitas
- Date of birth: 7 April 2000 (age 26)
- Place of birth: Guimarães, Portugal
- Height: 1.81 m (5 ft 11 in)
- Position: Left-back

Team information
- Current team: Felgueiras
- Number: 23

Youth career
- 2009–2016: Vitória Guimarães
- 2016–2018: Juventus
- 2018–2020: Vitória Guimarães

Senior career*
Years	Team	Apps	(Gls)
2020–2022	Vitória Guimarães B	44	(3)
2022–2024	Vitória Guimarães	39	(1)
2024–2025	Nacional	1	(0)
2025–2026	Marítimo	29	(1)
2026–	Felgueiras	4	(0)
- * Club domestic league appearances and goals as of 6 September 2026

Afonso Manuel Abreu de Freitas (born 7 April 2000) is a Portuguese professional footballer who plays as a left-back for the Liga Portugal 2 club Felgueiras.

== Club career ==
Freitas is mostly a youth product of Vitória Guimarães, and had a short stint in his youth development in Italy with Juventus from 2016 to 2018. He returned to Vitória Guimarães to finish his training, and was promoted to their B-team where he was a starter. On 4 June 2021, he signed a professional contract with the club until 2023. On 8 August 2022, he was promoted to their senior team and renewed his contract until 2025. He made his senior debut with Vitória Guimarães in a 1–0 Primeira Liga loss to Casa Pia on 29 August 2022.
