= Celton Biai =

Bissau-Guinean footballer (born 2000)

Personal information
- Full name: Celton Anssumane Biai
- Date of birth: 13 August 2000 (age 26)
- Place of birth: Lisbon, Portugal
- Height: 1.88 m (6 ft 2 in)
- Position: Goalkeeper

Team information
- Current team: Excelsior
- Number: 16

Youth career
- 2009–2019: Benfica

Senior career*
Years	Team	Apps	(Gls)
2019–2020	Benfica B	0	(0)
2020–2024	Vitória Guimarães B	52	(0)
2020–2024	Vitória Guimarães	5	(0)
2024–2026	Dordrecht	51	(0)
2026–	Excelsior	0	(0)

International career^{‡}
2017	Portugal U17	5	(0)
2018	Portugal U18	4	(0)
2018–2019	Portugal U19	15	(0)
2019	Portugal U20	2	(0)
2021–2023	Portugal U21	13	(0)
2023–	Guinea-Bissau	1	(0)
- * Club domestic league appearances and goals as of 28 April 2026 ‡ National team caps and goals as of 13 October 2023

Celton Anssumane Biai (born 13 August 2000) is a professional footballer who plays as a goalkeeper for Eredivisie club Excelsior. Born in Portugal, he plays for the Guinea-Bissau national team.

== Club career ==
Biai is a youth product of the academy Benfica, having joined them at the age of 9 in 2009. On 14 September 2018, he signed his first professional contract with Benfica until 2023. He was the named the goalie of the season for the U23 Liga Revelação for the 2018–19 season. On 30 January 2020, he transferred to Vitória SC where he was initially assigned to their reserves. He made his senior debut with Vitória SC in a 3–1 Taça de Portugal win over Canelas on 15 October 2022.

In January 2024, Biai signed for Eerste Divisie club Dordrecht on a two-and-a-half-year contract with the option for a further year.

On 17 July 2026, Biai moved to Eredivisie club Excelsior Rotterdam on a two-season deal.

== International career ==
In June 2019, he took part in the Maurice Revello Tournament in France

Born in Portugal, Biai is of Bissau-Guinean descent. He is a youth international for Portugal, having played up to the Portugal U21s.

In March 2023 he was called up to the senior Portugal squad for a UEFA Euro 2024 qualifier against Luxembourg.

In October 2023, Biai was called up to the Guinea-Bissau national team for friendly matches against Guinea and Togo.

== Career statistics ==
=== Club ===
As of match played 14 January 2024

Appearances and goals by club, season and competition
Club	Season	League			Taça de Portugal		Taça da Liga		Continental		Total	
Club	Season	Division	Apps	Goals	Apps	Goals	Apps	Goals	Apps	Goals	Apps	Goals
Benfica B	2019–20	LigaPro	0	0	—		—		—		0	0
Vitória SC B	2019–20	Campeonato de Portugal	0	0	—		—		—		0	0
Vitória SC B	2020–21	Campeonato de Portugal	19	0	—		—		—		19	0
Vitória SC B	2021–22	Liga 3	22	0	—		—		—		22	0
Vitória SC B	2023–24	Campeonato de Portugal	11	0	—		—		—		11	0
Vitória SC B	Total		52	0	—		—		—		52	0
Vitória SC	2022–23	Primeira Liga	5	0	3	0	2	0	0	0	10	0
Career Total			57	0	3	0	2	0	0	0	60	0
