= Jorge Fernandes (footballer, born 1997) =

Portuguese footballer

Personal information
- Full name: Jorge Filipe Oliveira Fernandes
- Date of birth: 2 April 1997 (age 29)
- Place of birth: Braga, Portugal
- Height: 1.93 m (6 ft 4 in)
- Position: Centre-back

Team information
- Current team: Shabab Al Ahli
- Number: 44

Youth career
- 2006–2007: Fernando Pires
- 2007–2016: Porto
- 2012–2013: → Padroense (loan)

Senior career*
Years	Team	Apps	(Gls)
2015–2018	Porto B	39	(1)
2017–2020	Porto	0	(0)
2018–2019	→ Tondela (loan)	32	(0)
2019–2020	→ Kasımpaşa (loan)	18	(0)
2020–2025	Vitória Guimarães	85	(2)
2025–2026	Al Fateh	45	(2)
2026–	Shabab Al Ahli	3	(0)

International career
2013	Portugal U17	2	(0)
2014–2015	Portugal U18	5	(1)
2015–2016	Portugal U19	4	(0)
2016–2017	Portugal U20	12	(0)
2018	Portugal U21	9	(0)
- * Club domestic league appearances and goals as of 16:20, 28 September 2026 (UTC)

Jorge Filipe Oliveira Fernandes (born 2 April 1997) is a Portuguese professional footballer who plays as a centre-back for UAE Pro League club Shabab Al Ahli.

== Club career ==
=== Porto ===
Born in Braga, Minho Province, Fernandes joined FC Porto's youth academy at the age of 10. On 15 August 2015, still a junior, he made his senior debut with their reserves by coming on as a 59th-minute substitute in a 2–1 away win against C.D. Santa Clara in the Segunda Liga. He scored his first goal in the competition on 16 September 2017, helping the hosts defeat C.D. Nacional 2–1.

On 31 January 2018, Fernandes was loaned to Primeira Liga club C.D. Tondela. His maiden appearance in the Portuguese top division took place nine days later when he replaced Pedro Nuno shortly after Ícaro was sent off in the away fixture against F.C. Paços de Ferreira, helping his team secure a 2–0 victory. The move was extended for the 2018–19 season.

=== Vitória Guimarães ===
After a season on loan at Kasımpaşa S.K. in the Turkish Süper Lig, Fernandes rescinded his Porto contract and signed a five-year deal at Vitória de Guimarães, who purchased 60% of his economic rights on 1 August 2020. He scored his first top-flight goal on the following 19 May, in a 3–1 home loss to S.L. Benfica.

=== Al Fateh ===
On 31 January 2025, Fernandes joined Saudi Pro League side Al Fateh SC, on a deal until June 2026 for a €500,000 fee. He scored his first goal on 24 October, in the 2–1 home win over Al-Ettifaq Club.

=== Shabab Al Ahli ===
Fernandes moved to the UAE Pro League on 11 July 2026, on a contract at Shabab Al Ahli Club.

== International career ==
Fernandes earned 32 caps for Portugal across all youth levels. He scored his one goal on 5 June 2015 for the under-18 team in a 3–1 win over China in Mafra, to win the Torneio de Lisboa.

Fernandes was part of the under-20 side that reached the quarter-finals of the 2017 FIFA World Cup in South Korea. In 2018, he took part with the under-21 team in qualification for the following year's UEFA European Championship.
