= Mamadou Tounkara (footballer, born 2001) =

Malian footballer (born 2001)

Personal information
- Date of birth: 14 December 2001 (age 24)
- Place of birth: Épinay-sur-Seine, France
- Height: 1.92 m (6 ft 4 in)
- Position: Centre-back

Team information
- Current team: Chaves
- Number: 29

Youth career
- Drancy

Senior career*
Years	Team	Apps	(Gls)
2019–2020	Drancy	1	(0)
2020–2024	Vitória Guimarães B	50	(1)
2022–2024	Vitória Guimarães	14	(0)
2024–	Chaves	14	(0)

International career^{‡}
2024–	Mali U23	5	(1)
- * Club domestic league appearances and goals as of 20 June 2026 ‡ National team caps and goals as of 22:28, 9 December 2025 (UTC)

Mamadou Tounkara (born 14 December 2001) is a professional footballer who plays as a centre-back for Liga Portugal 2 club Chaves. Born in France, he is a youth international for Mali.

== Club career ==
A youth product of Drancy, Tounkara began his senior career with them in 2019. On 16 June 2020, he transferred to Vitória SC where he signed a 3-year contract. He spent his first 2 seasons with their reserves. He made his professional debut with Vitória SC as a half-time substitute in a 1–0 Primeira Liga loss to Braga on 3 September 2022. On 10 September 2022, he was promoted to their senior side and renewed his contract until 2025.

On 20 August 2024, Tounkara signed for Liga Portugal 2 club Chaves. On 19 January 2026, he extended his contract with the club until June 2028.

== Personal life ==
Born in France, Tounkara is of Malian descent.
