= André Amaro =

Portuguese footballer

Personal information
- Full name: André Fonseca Amaro
- Date of birth: 13 August 2002 (age 24)
- Place of birth: Coimbra, Portugal
- Height: 1.88 m (6 ft 2 in)
- Position: Centre-back

Youth career
- 2011–2017: Naval
- 2017–2018: Académica
- 2018–2020: Vitória SC

Senior career*
Years	Team	Apps	(Gls)
2020–2022	Vitória SC B	23	(1)
2020–2023	Vitória SC	46	(3)
2023–2026	Al-Rayyan	63	(2)

International career^{‡}
2021–	Portugal U20	9	(0)
2022–	Portugal U21	4	(0)
- * Club domestic league appearances and goals as of 26 September 2024 ‡ National team caps and goals as of 26 September 2023

André Fonseca Amaro (born 13 August 2002) is a Portuguese footballer who plays as a centre-back. A physically dominant and tactically intelligent defender, Amaro has established himself as a key player for Al-Rayyan. He has also represented Portugal at youth international levels.

== Club career ==
=== Vitória SC B ===
Amaro began his senior career with Vitória SC B in 2020, competing in the third division. Over two seasons, he made 23 appearances and scored one goal, quickly earning attention for his performances.

=== Vitória SC ===
He made his first-team debut for Vitória SC on 21 December 2020, coming on as an 85th-minute substitute for Pepelu in a 4–0 Primeira Liga victory over Santa Clara. Amaro featured in 12 matches during his first top-flight season, scoring his first goal in a 2–0 derby win over Moreirense on 30 April 2021.

In May 2021, he renewed his contract until 2025, with a buyout clause raised to €50 million.

=== Al-Rayyan ===
On 9 August 2023, Amaro transferred to Al-Rayyan in the Qatar Stars League, for a reported fee of €8.5 million, potentially rising to €10 million through add-ons. He became a key figure in the team's defense, playing under managers such as Leonardo Jardim and Artur Jorge. Over his first two seasons, Amaro made 67 appearances and scored four goals across domestic and continental competitions.

== Career statistics ==
Appearances and goals by club, season and competition
Club	Season	League			National cup		League cup		Continental		Other^{1}		Total	
Club	Season	Division	Apps	Goals	Apps	Goals	Apps	Goals	Apps	Goals	Apps	Goals	Apps	Goals
Vitória SC B	2020–21	Campeonato de Portugal	12	1	–	–	–	–	–	–	–	–	12	1
Vitória SC B	2021–22	Campeonato de Portugal	11	0	–	–	–	–	–	–	–	–	11	0
Vitória SC B	Total		23	1	–	–	–	–	–	–	–	–	23	1
Vitória SC	2020–21	Primeira Liga	12	1	0	0	0	0	–	–	–	–	12	1
Vitória SC	2021–22	Primeira Liga	7	0	1	0	1	0	–	–	–	–	9	0
Vitória SC	2022–23	Primeira Liga	27	1	2	0	0	0	3	0	–	–	32	1
Vitória SC	2023–24	Primeira Liga	0	-	-	-	-	-	2	1	-	-	2	1
Vitória SC	Total		46	2	3	0	1	0	5	1	–	–	55	3
Al-Rayyan	2023–24	Qatar Stars League	21	1	2	0	5	1	-	-	2	0	32	2
Al-Rayyan	2024–25	Qatar Stars League	21	0	0	0	4	0	10	0	–	–	35	0
Al-Rayyan	Total		42	1	2	0	9	1	10	0	2	0	65	2
Career total			111	4	5	0	10	1	15	1	2	0	143	6

== International career ==
Amaro has represented Portugal at under-20 and under-21 levels. He debuted for the U20 side in 2021 before advancing to the U21 team, scoring his first goal during a 3–0 win over Romania in the 2025 UEFA European Under-21 Championship qualifiers.

== Style of play ==
Amaro is a physically strong and tactically intelligent centre-back. Known for his aerial dominance, positional awareness, and ability to play out from the back, he is comfortable in both a back three and four. His leadership and calmness under pressure have drawn comparisons to Portuguese greats such as Pepe.
