= 2022–23 S.L. Benfica season =

Benfica
2022–23 season
- President: Rui Costa
- Head coach: Roger Schmidt
- Stadium: Estádio da Luz
- Primeira Liga: 1st
- Taça de Portugal: Quarter-finals
- Taça da Liga: Group stage
- UEFA Champions League: Quarter-finals
- Top goalscorer: League: Gonçalo Ramos (19); All: Gonçalo Ramos (27)
- Highest home attendance: 64,012 v Santa Clara (27 May 2023)
- Lowest home attendance: 43,263 v Penafiel (26 November 2022)
- Average home league attendance: 57,108 (17 matches)
- Biggest win: Benfica 5–0 Marítimo (18 September 2022); Benfica 5–0 Chaves (29 October 2022); Maccabi Haifa 1–6 Benfica (2 November 2022)
- Biggest defeat: Braga 3–0 Benfica (30 December 2022)
| Home colours | Away colours | Third colours |

The 2022–23 Sport Lisboa e Benfica season was the club's 119th season in existence and its 89th consecutive season in the top flight of Portuguese football. It started on 2 August 2022, with the third qualifying round of the UEFA Champions League, where Benfica qualified for the group stage, reaching the quarter-finals, and concluded on 27 May 2023. Domestically, Benfica played in the Primeira Liga, Taça de Portugal, and Taça da Liga, winning the league title for a record-extending 38th time in their history.

== Season summary ==
=== Pre-Season ===
Benfica entered the 2022–23 season without a trophy since the 2020 Supertaça Cândido de Oliveira. Roger Schmidt was appointed as manager. The squad underwent several changes: defenders John Brooks, João Victor, Mihailo Ristić and Alexander Bah; midfielders Fredrik Aursnes, Enzo Fernández and Julian Draxler (on loan); winger David Neres; and striker Petar Musa all joined the club. Departures included Jan Vertonghen, Tomás Araújo (on loan), Soualiho Meïté, Gabriel, Gedson Fernandes, Julian Weigl, Pizzi, Jota, Roman Yaremchuk, Haris Seferovic and Darwin Núñez.

Pre-season began on 25 June, with the first friendly on 9 July, a 2–0 win over Reading. Further victories followed against OGC Nice, Fulham F.C., Girona FC, Newcastle United F.C. and Amora F.C..

=== August-October ===
The first official match of the season was on 2 August 2022 against Midtjylland in the third qualifying round of the Champions League, at home. Benfica won 4–1, and secured progression with a 3–1 victory in the second leg. In the play-off round, Benfica defeated Dynamo Kyiv 2–0 away and 3–0 at home, qualifying for the group stage. Between Champions League fixtures, the team also recorded league wins over Arouca (4–0), Casa Pia (1–0), Boavista (3–0) and Paços de Ferreira (3–2).

September was a perfect month for Benfica, who won all their matches: Vizela (2–1), Maccabi Haifa (2–0) in the Champions League, Famalicão (1–0), Juventus (2–1) in the Champions League and Marítimo (5–0). The team finished the month two points ahead of Braga. October opened with a 0–0 draw at Vitória de Guimarães and a 1–1 home draw with Paris Saint-Germain, featuring Lionel Messi, Kylian Mbappé and Neymar, followed by a 4–2 win over Rio Ave. Benfica then drew 1–1 away with Paris Saint-Germain, advanced in the Taça de Portugal after a penalty shoot-out against Caldas S.C., and won 1–0 away against Porto at the Estádio do Dragão. The team closed the month with victories over Juventus (4–3) and Chaves (5–0), finishing October with a six-point lead in the league.

=== November-January ===
In November, Benfica won all their matches. They began with a 6–1 away victory over Maccabi Haifa, finishing first in Group H and qualifying for the Champions League round of 16. Domestic wins followed against Estoril (in both the league and the Taça de Portugal), Gil Vicente, Estrela da Amadora and Penafiel (both in the Taça da Liga). The last Taça da Liga group stage match, played during the World Cup, ended in a 1–1 draw away to Moreirense, with Benfica eliminated on goal difference.

After the World Cup break, Benfica resumed competition with a 3–0 away defeat against Braga. January was marked by speculation surrounding Enzo Fernández, who eventually left the club on 31 January. Following the first defeat of the season, Benfica responded with a 1–0 home win over Portimonense, a 2–0 away win over Varzim in the Taça de Portugal round of 16, a 2–2 home draw with Sporting (with two goals from Gonçalo Ramos), a 3–0 away win over Santa Clara, a 2–0 home win against Paços de Ferreira, and a 3–0 away win over Arouca, finishing the month with a five-point lead.

=== February-March ===
Benfica opened February with a 3–0 home win over Casa Pia, but were eliminated in the Taça de Portugal quarter-finals after a penalty shoot-out loss to Braga, having played most of the match with ten men. They reacted with a series of victories: 2–0 away against Club Brugge in the Champions League, 3–1 at home to Boavista, 2–0 away to Vizela, 2–0 at home to Famalicão, 5–1 at home against Brugge in the Champions League, 3–0 away to Marítimo, and 5–1 at home to Vitória de Guimarães. They ended March eliminated from the Taça de Portugal but with a 10-point lead in the league and in the Champions League quarter-finals.

=== April-May ===
April proved difficult for the club. Benfica began the month with a 1–0 away victory against Rio Ave. In the following match, at the Estádio da Luz, they took the lead against Porto but lost 2–1. Expectations were high ahead of the Champions League quarter-finals, but Benfica suffered a 2–0 home defeat to Inter Milan in the first leg. A 1–0 loss to Chaves further reduced their league lead to four points. A 3–3 away draw in Milan in the second leg eliminated Benfica from the Champions League.

The winless run ended with four consecutive league victories against Estoril, Gil Vicente, Braga and Portimonense. On 21 May, Benfica faced Sporting at the Estádio José Alvalade, knowing a win would secure the title. The match ended in a 2–2 draw, leaving the team two points clear. On 27 May, Benfica defeated Santa Clara 3–0 at home, clinching their 38th league championship.

== Players ==
=== First-team squad ===
Note: Flags indicate national team as defined under FIFA eligibility rules; some limited exceptions apply. Players may hold more than one non-FIFA nationality.

| No. | Pos. | Nation | Player |
|---|---|---|---|
| 2 | DF | BRA | Gilberto |
| 3 | DF | ESP | Álex Grimaldo |
| 4 | DF | BRA | Lucas Veríssimo |
| 6 | DF | DEN | Alexander Bah |
| 7 | MF | BRA | David Neres |
| 8 | MF | NOR | Fredrik Aursnes |
| 15 | MF | POR | Gonçalo Guedes (on loan from Wolves) |
| 19 | FW | DEN | Casper Tengstedt |
| 20 | MF | POR | João Mário (vice-captain) |
| 21 | MF | NOR | Andreas Schjelderup |
| 22 | MF | POR | Chiquinho |
| 23 | DF | SRB | Mihailo Ristić |
| 24 | GK | POR | Samuel Soares |

| No. | Pos. | Nation | Player |
|---|---|---|---|
| 27 | MF | POR | Rafa Silva |
| 30 | DF | ARG | Nicolás Otamendi (captain) |
| 33 | FW | CRO | Petar Musa |
| 61 | MF | POR | Florentino |
| 66 | DF | POR | António Silva |
| 73 | MF | ITA | Cher Ndour |
| 75 | GK | POR | André Gomes |
| 87 | MF | POR | João Neves |
| 88 | FW | POR | Gonçalo Ramos |
| 91 | DF | BRA | Morato |
| 93 | MF | GER | Julian Draxler (on loan from PSG) |
| 96 | MF | POR | Diego Moreira |
| 99 | GK | GRE | Odysseas Vlachodimos |

== Transfers ==
=== In ===
| No. | Pos | Player | Transferred from | Fee | Date | Source |
|---|---|---|---|---|---|---|
| 33 | FW | (Croatia) Petar Musa | (Portugal) Boavista | €6,400,000 | 1 July 2022 | |
| 23 | DF | (Serbia) Mihailo Ristić | (France) Montpellier | Free | 1 July 2022 | |
| 6 | DF | (Denmark) Alexander Bah | (Czech Republic) Slavia Prague | €8,600,000 | 1 July 2022 | |
| 7 | FW | (Brazil) David Neres | (Ukraine) Shakhtar Donetsk | €15,300,000 | 1 July 2022 | |
| 38 | DF | (Brazil) João Victor | (Brazil) Corinthians | €8,500,000 | 8 July 2022 | |
| 13 | MF | (Argentina) Enzo Fernández | (Argentina) River Plate | €10,000,000 | 14 July 2022 | |
| 8 | MF | (Norway) Fredrik Aursnes | (Netherlands) Feyenoord | €13,000,000 | 24 August 2022 | |
| 93 | MF | (Germany) Julian Draxler | (France) Paris Saint-Germain | Loan (€2,500,000) | 1 September 2022 | |
| 25 | DF | (United States) John Brooks | (Germany) Wolfsburg | Free | 1 September 2022 | |
| 19 | FW | (Denmark) Casper Tengstedt | (Norway) Rosenborg | €9,500,000 | 11 January 2023 | |
| 21 | MF | (Norway) Andreas Schjelderup | (Denmark) Nordsjælland | €14,000,000 | 11 January 2023 | |
| 15 | MF | (Portugal) Gonçalo Guedes | (England) Wolverhampton Wanderers | Loan | 20 January 2023 | |
Disclosed total
€87,800,000

=== Out ===
| No. | Pos | Player | Transferred to | Fee | Date | Source |
|---|---|---|---|---|---|---|
| 9 | FW | (Uruguay) Darwin Núñez | (England) Liverpool | €75,000,000 | 1 July 2022 | |
| 7 | MF | (Brazil) Everton | (Brazil) Flamengo | €13,500,000 | 1 July 2022 | |
| — | MF | (Portugal) Gedson Fernandes | (Turkey) Beşiktaş | €6,000,000 | 1 July 2022 | |
| — | MF | (Portugal) Tiago Dantas | (Greece) PAOK | Loan | 1 July 2022 | |
| — | DF | (Portugal) Pedro Pereira | (Italy) Monza | €2,500,000 | 1 July 2022 | |
| — | FW | (Portugal) Jota | (Scotland) Celtic | €7,300,000 | 1 July 2022 | |
| 1 | GK | (Serbia) Mile Svilar | (Italy) Roma | Free | 1 July 2022 | |
| — | DF | (Portugal) Ferro | (Netherlands) Vitesse | Loan | 15 July 2022 | |
| 14 | FW | (Switzerland) Haris Seferovic | (Turkey) Galatasaray | Loan (€1,000,000) | 19 July 2022 | |
| 72 | DF | (Portugal) Tomás Araújo | (Portugal) Gil Vicente | Loan | 27 July 2022 | |
| 21 | MF | (Portugal) Pizzi | (United Arab Emirates) Al Wahda | Free | 28 July 2022 | |
| — | MF | (Portugal) Nuno Santos | (United States) Charlotte | €1,000,000 | 4 August 2022 | |
| — | MF | (Brazil) Gabriel | (Brazil) Botafogo | Loan | 12 August 2022 | |
| 9 | FW | (Ukraine) Roman Yaremchuk | (Belgium) Club Brugge | €16,000,000 | 29 August 2022 | |
| — | FW | (Brazil) Carlos Vinícius | (England) Fulham | €5,000,000 | 1 September 2022 | |
| 11 | MF | (France) Soualiho Meïté | (Italy) Cremonese | Loan | 1 September 2022 | |
| 28 | MF | (Germany) Julian Weigl | (Germany) Borussia Mönchengladbach | Loan | 1 September 2022 | |
| 49 | MF | (Morocco) Adel Taarabt | (United Arab Emirates) Al-Nasr | Free | 2 September 2022 | |
| 5 | DF | (Belgium) Jan Vertonghen | (Belgium) Anderlecht | Free | 2 September 2022 | |
| 18 | FW | (Brazil) Rodrigo Pinho | (Brazil) Coritiba | €2,500,000 | 29 December 2022 | |
| 17 | MF | (Portugal) Diogo Gonçalves | (Denmark) Copenhagen | €2,000,000 | 5 January 2023 | |
| 77 | GK | (Brazil) Helton Leite | (Turkey) Antalyaspor | Free | 20 January 2023 | |
| 39 | FW | (Portugal) Henrique Araújo | (England) Watford | Loan | 23 January 2023 | |
| — | DF | (Portugal) Tomás Tavares | (Russia) Spartak Moscow | €3,000,000 | 24 January 2023 | |
| 38 | DF | (Brazil) João Victor | (France) Nantes | Loan | 25 January 2023 | |
| 25 | DF | (United States) John Brooks | (Germany) Hoffenheim | €500,000 | 26 January 2023 | |
| — | DF | (Argentina) Germán Conti | (Russia) Lokomotiv Moscow | Free | 30 January 2023 | |
| 31 | DF | (Portugal) Gil Dias | (Germany) Stuttgart | €2,000,000 | 30 January 2023 | |
| 55 | MF | (Portugal) Paulo Bernardo | (Portugal) Paços de Ferreira | Loan | 31 January 2023 | |
| 14 | FW | (Switzerland) Haris Seferovic | (Spain) Celta de Vigo | Loan | 31 January 2023 | |
| 13 | MF | (Argentina) Enzo Fernandez | (England) Chelsea | €121,000,000 | 31 January 2023 | |
| 34 | DF | (Portugal) André Almeida | | Free | 1 February 2023 | |
| — | DF | (Portugal) Ferro | (Croatia) Hajduk Split | €1,500,000 | 15 February 2023 | |
Disclosed total
€259,800,000

== Pre-season and friendlies ==
Win Draw Loss Fixtures The pre-season began on 25 June and ended on 27 July 2022.

| 9 July 2022 Friendly | Reading | 0–2 | Benfica | Burton upon Trent, England |
| 16:00 WEST (UTC+01:00) | | | Bah 65'; Dias 72' | Stadium: St George's Park; Attendance: 0 Referee: Michael Salisbury |

| 15 July 2022 Algarve Cup | Benfica | 3–0 (5–4 p) | Nice | Faro/Loulé |
| 21:00 WEST (UTC+01:00) | R. Silva 7'; Otamendi 20'; Gilberto 36' | | | Stadium: Estádio Algarve; Referee: Hélder Malheiro |
| | Penalties |
| | Yaremchuk (penalty scored); Dias (penalty scored); A. Silva (penalty scored); Vertonghen (penalty scored); Pizzi (penalty scored) | | (penalty scored) Claude-Maurice; (penalty scored) Trouillet; (penalty scored) Lotomba; (penalty scored) Brahimi; (penalty missed) Atal |
Note: A penalty shoot-out was held after the match in case the competition needed a tiebreaker.

| 17 July 2022 Algarve Cup | Fulham | 1–5 | Benfica | Faro/Loulé |
| 20:15 WEST (UTC+01:00) | Mitrović 61'; Ream (yellow card) 69'; Pereira (yellow card) 88' | | R. Silva 3'; Ramos 21', 29'; Yaremchuk 57'; Araújo 64' | Stadium: Estádio Algarve; Attendance: ~15,000; Referee: Nuno Almeida |
Note: Benfica won the trophy.

| 22 July 2022 Friendly | Benfica | 4–2 | Girona | Yverdon-les-Bains, Switzerland |
| 17:30 CEST (UTC+02:00) | Vertonghen 57'; Bah 60'; Yaremchuk 67' (pen.); A. Silva (yellow card) 80'; Pinho 89' | | Sáiz (yellow card) 37'; Stuani 52'; Bueno 77'; Sala (yellow card) 90+1' | Stadium: Stade Municipal; Referee: Tobias Thies |

| 26 July 2022 Eusébio Cup | Benfica | 3–2 | Newcastle United | Lisbon |
| 20:00 WEST (UTC+01:00) | Ramos 15'; João Mário (yellow card) 20'; Grimaldo 32'; Araújo 89' | | Bruno Guimarães (yellow card) 11'; Almirón 22', 44'; Burn (yellow card) 72'; Joelinton (yellow card) 79' (yellow-red card) 82' | Stadium: Estádio da Luz; Attendance: 49,081; Referee: Nuno Almeida |

| 27 July 2022 Friendly | Benfica | 3–1 | Amora | Seixal |
| WEST (UTC+01:00) | Musa; Chiquinho | Report | Ebah | Stadium: Benfica Campus |
Note: non-televised training match

| 11 December 2022 Friendly | Benfica | 0–1 | Sevilla | Algarve |
| 17:00 WET (UTC±00:00) | Veríssimo (yellow card) 66'; Gilberto (yellow card) 89' | Report | Rakitić 61'; Romero (yellow card) 81' | Stadium: Estádio do Algarve; Referee: Miguel Nogueira (Lisbon) |

== Competitions ==
=== Overall record ===
| Competition | First match | Last match | Starting round | Final position | Record | | | | | | | |
| Competition | First match | Last match | Starting round | Final position | Pld | W | D | L | GF | GA | GD | Win % |
|---|---|---|---|---|---|---|---|---|---|---|---|---|
| Primeira Liga | 5 August 2022 | 27 May 2023 | Matchday 1 | Winners | 34 | 28 | 3 | 3 | 82 | 20 | +62 | 82.35 |
| Taça de Portugal | 15 October 2022 | 9 February 2023 | Third round | Quarter-finals | 4 | 2 | 2 | 0 | 5 | 2 | +3 | 50.00 |
| Taça da Liga | 20 November 2022 | 17 December 2022 | Group stage | Group stage | 3 | 2 | 1 | 0 | 6 | 3 | +3 | 66.67 |
| UEFA Champions League | 2 August 2022 | 19 April 2023 | Third qualifying round | Quarter-finals | 14 | 10 | 3 | 1 | 38 | 15 | +23 | 71.43 |
| Total | | | | | 55 | 42 | 9 | 4 | 131 | 40 | +91 | 76.36 |

Source: Competitions

=== Primeira Liga ===
==== League table ====
| Pos | Team | Pld | W | D | L | GF | GA | GD | Pts | Qualification or relegation |
|---|---|---|---|---|---|---|---|---|---|---|
| 1 | Benfica (C) | 34 | 28 | 3 | 3 | 82 | 20 | +62 | 87 | Qualification for the Champions League group stage |
| 2 | Porto | 34 | 27 | 4 | 3 | 73 | 22 | +51 | 85 | Qualification for the Champions League group stage |
| 3 | Braga | 34 | 25 | 3 | 6 | 75 | 30 | +45 | 78 | Qualification for the Champions League third qualifying round |
| 4 | Sporting CP | 34 | 23 | 5 | 6 | 71 | 32 | +39 | 74 | Qualification for the Europa League group stage |
| 5 | Arouca | 34 | 15 | 9 | 10 | 36 | 37 | −1 | 54 | Qualification for the Europa Conference League third qualifying round |

Source: Liga Portugal
Rules for classification: 1) Points; 2) Head-to-head points; 3) Head-to-head goal difference; 4) Goal difference; 5) Matches won; 6) Goals scored; 7) Play-off.
(C) Champions

==== Results summary ====
| Overall | | | | | | | | Home | | | | | | Away | | | | | |
| Pld | W | D | L | GF | GA | GD | Pts | W | D | L | GF | GA | GD | W | D | L | GF | GA | GD |
|---|---|---|---|---|---|---|---|---|---|---|---|---|---|---|---|---|---|---|---|
| 34 | 28 | 3 | 3 | 82 | 20 | +62 | 87 | 15 | 1 | 1 | 48 | 12 | +36 | 13 | 2 | 2 | 34 | 8 | +26 |

==== Results by round ====
| Round | 1 | 2 | 3 | 4 | 5 | 6 | 7 | 8 | 9 | 10 | 11 | 12 | 13 | 14 | 15 | 16 | 17 | 18 | 19 | 20 | 21 | 22 | 23 | 24 | 25 | 26 | 27 | 28 | 29 | 30 | 31 | 32 | 33 | 34 |
|---|---|---|---|---|---|---|---|---|---|---|---|---|---|---|---|---|---|---|---|---|---|---|---|---|---|---|---|---|---|---|---|---|---|---|
| Ground | H | A | H | A | H | A | H | A | H | A | H | A | H | A | H | H | A | A | H | A | H | A | H | A | H | A | H | A | H | A | H | A | A | H |
| Result | W | W | W | W | W | W | W | D | W | W | W | W | W | L | W | D | W | W | W | W | W | W | W | W | W | W | L | L | W | W | W | W | D | W |
| Position | 2 | 2 | 2 | 1 | 1 | 1 | 1 | 1 | 1 | 1 | 1 | 1 | 1 | 1 | 1 | 1 | 1 | 1 | 1 | 1 | 1 | 1 | 1 | 1 | 1 | 1 | 1 | 1 | 1 | 1 | 1 | 1 | 1 | 1 |
| Points | 3 | 6 | 9 | 12 | 15 | 18 | 21 | 22 | 25 | 28 | 31 | 34 | 37 | 37 | 40 | 41 | 44 | 47 | 50 | 53 | 56 | 59 | 62 | 65 | 68 | 71 | 71 | 71 | 74 | 77 | 80 | 83 | 84 | 87 |

Source: Liga Portugal
A = Away; H = Home; W = Win; D = Draw; L = Loss

==== Matches ====
The league fixtures were announced on 5 July 2022.

| 5 August 2022 1 | Benfica | 4–0 | Arouca | Lisbon |
| 20:15 WEST (UTC+01:00) | Gilberto 8'; R. Silva 41', 86' (yellow card) 83'; Fernández 45+5'; Florentino (yellow card) 54'; Weigl (yellow card) 82' | Report | Opoku (yellow card) 1'; Quaresma (red card) 44' | Stadium: Estádio da Luz; Attendance: 53,617; Referee: Manuel Mota (Braga) |

| 13 August 2022 2 | Casa Pia | 0–1 | Benfica | Leiria |
| 18:00 WEST (UTC+01:00) | Neto (yellow card) 6'; Godwin (yellow card) 26'; Taira (yellow card) 31'; Kunimoto (yellow card) 51'; Fernandes (yellow card) 59'; Anderson (yellow card) 90' | Report | Otamendi (yellow card) 28' (yellow-red card) 90+1'; Florentino (yellow card) 30'; Ramos 58'; R. Silva (yellow card) 90+4' | Stadium: Estádio Dr. Magalhães Pessoa; Attendance: 22,253; Referee: Tiago Martins (Lisbon) |

| 27 August 2022 4 | Boavista | 0–3 | Benfica | Porto |
| 18:00 WEST (UTC+01:00) | Lourenço (yellow card) 27'; Cannon (yellow card) 52'; Sasso (yellow card) 81'; Makouta (yellow card) 90+2' | Report | A. Silva (yellow card) 7'; Morato 30'; Grimaldo (yellow card) 56'; João Mário 67', 81' (pen.) | Stadium: Estádio do Bessa; Attendance: 10,939; Referee: João Pinheiro (Braga) |
Note: Match was brought forward.

| 30 August 2022 3 | Benfica | 3–2 | Paços de Ferreira | Lisbon |
| 20:15 WEST (UTC+01:00) | R. Silva (yellow card) 16'; Neres 42'; João Mário 45+4' (pen.); Ramos 56'; Fernández (yellow card) 83' | Report | Holsgrove (yellow card) 14'; Ramos (yellow card) 34'; Koffi 39', 80'; Oliveira (yellow card) 45+2'; Ibrahim (yellow card) 89' | Stadium: Estádio da Luz; Attendance: 55,151; Referee: Artur Soares Dias (Porto) |

| 2 September 2022 5 | Benfica | 2–1 | Vizela | Lisbon |
| 19:00 WEST (UTC+01:00) | Otamendi (yellow card) 42'; Fernández (yellow card) 51'; Neres 76'; João Mário (yellow card) 82' (yellow-red card) 90+12' (goal) 90+12' (pen.); Aursnes (yellow card) 84'; Ramos (yellow card) 89' (yellow-red card) 90+1' | Report | Osmajić 20'; Guzzo (yellow card) 25'; Tomás (yellow card) 45+1'; Mendez (yellow card) 86'; Rosa (yellow card) 90+9' | Stadium: Estádio da Luz; Attendance: 47,958; Referee: Fábio Veríssimo (Leiria) |

| 10 September 2022 6 | Famalicão | 0–1 | Benfica | Vila Nova de Famalicão |
| 15:30 WEST (UTC+01:00) | Colombatto (yellow card) 90+2'; Sá (yellow card) 90+4'; Rodrigues (red card) | Report | R. Silva 63' | Stadium: Estádio Municipal 22 de Junho; Attendance: 4,867; Referee: Nuno Almeida (Algarve) |

| 18 September 2022 7 | Benfica | 5–0 | Marítimo | Lisbon |
| 18:00 WEST (UTC+01:00) | R. Silva 28'; Grimaldo (yellow card) 63'; Ramos 47', 64'; Neres 82'; Draxler 88' | Report | Andrade (yellow card) 4'; Mendes (yellow card) 35'; Silva (yellow card) 57' | Stadium: Estádio da Luz; Attendance: 56,889; Referee: António Nobre (Leiria) |

| 1 October 2022 8 | Vitória de Guimarães | 0–0 | Benfica | Guimarães |
| 20:30 WEST (UTC+01:00) | André (yellow card) 41'; Bamba (yellow card) 48'; Safira (yellow card) 74'; Lameiras (yellow card) 90+3' | Report | R. Silva (yellow card) 52' | Stadium: Estádio D. Afonso Henriques; Attendance: 19,231; Referee: Rui Costa (Porto) |

| 8 October 2022 9 | Benfica | 4–2 | Rio Ave | Lisbon |
| 18:00 WEST (UTC+01:00) | Ramos 12', 45+1'; Jhonatan 18' (o.g.); Musa (yellow card) 58' (goal) 61' | Report | Ronaldo 5'; Costinha (yellow card) 57'; Amaral (yellow card) 82'; Guga 85' | Stadium: Estádio da Luz; Attendance: 56,176; Referee: Manuel Oliveira (Porto) |

| 21 October 2022 10 | Porto | 0–1 | Benfica | Porto |
| 20:15 WEST (UTC+01:00) | Eustáquio (yellow card) 24' (yellow-red card) 27'; Ramos (yellow card) 43'; Cardoso (yellow card) 63'; Taremi (yellow card) 74' | Report | João Mário (yellow card) 6'; Bah (yellow card) 11'; Fernández (yellow card) 37'; Aursnes (yellow card) 44'; Neres (yellow card) 60'; R. Silva 72'; Grimaldo (yellow card) 80'; Gilberto (yellow card) 90+5' | Stadium: Estádio do Dragão; Attendance: 49,499; Referee: João Pinheiro (Braga) |

| 29 October 2022 11 | Benfica | 5–0 | Chaves | Lisbon |
| 18:00 WEST (UTC+01:00) | Neres 2'; Grimaldo 9'; Aursnes (yellow card) 31'; Otamendi (yellow card) 31'; Ramos 37'; Musa 80'; R. Silva 90+2' | Report | Guima (yellow card) 41'; Issah (yellow card) 44' | Stadium: Estádio da Luz; Attendance: 54,990; Referee: Luís Godinho (Évora) |

| 6 November 2022 12 | Estoril | 1–5 | Benfica | Estoril |
| 20:30 WET (UTC±00:00) | Sérginho 90' | Report | Musa 25'; A. Silva 29', 40'; João Mário 66'; Ristić 88' | Stadium: Estádio António Coimbra da Mota; Attendance: 4,858; Referee: Nuno Almeida (Algarve) |

| 13 November 2022 13 | Benfica | 3–1 | Gil Vicente | Lisbon |
| 18:00 WET (UTC±00:00) | João Mário 9' (pen.); Ramos 36', 53'; Otamendi (yellow card) 86' | Report | Navarro 17'; Simões (yellow card) 86' | Stadium: Estádio da Luz; Attendance: 57,266; Referee: Manuel Oliveira (Porto) |

| 30 December 2022 14 | Braga | 3–0 | Benfica | Braga |
| 21:15 WET (UTC±00:00) | Ruiz 2'; R. Horta 32', 70'; A. Horta (yellow card) 78' | Report | Florentino (yellow card) 27'; R. Silva (yellow card) 85'; Otamendi (yellow card) 87' | Stadium: Estádio Municipal de Braga; Attendance: 19,398; Referee: João Pinheiro (Braga) |

| 6 January 2023 15 | Benfica | 1–0 | Portimonense | Lisbon |
| 19:00 WET (UTC±00:00) | João Mário 9' (pen.) | Report | Nakamura (yellow card) 7'; Ouattara (yellow card) 25' | Stadium: Estádio da Luz; Attendance: 50,559; Referee: Vítor Ferreira (Braga) |

| 15 January 2023 16 | Benfica | 2–2 | Sporting CP | Lisbon |
| 18:00 WET (UTC±00:00) | Otamendi (yellow card) 5'; Ramos 37', 64'; R. Silva (yellow card) 41' | Report | Bah 27' (o.g.); Gonçalves (yellow card) 45+3' (goal) 53' (pen.); Trincão (yellow card) 46'; Ugarte (yellow card) 61'; St. Juste (yellow card) 86'; Chermiti (yellow card) 88' | Stadium: Estádio da Luz; Attendance: 62,295; Referee: Artur Soares Dias (Porto) |

| 21 January 2023 17 | Santa Clara | 0–3 | Benfica | Ponta Delgada |
| 17:00 AZOT (UTC−01:00) | Ítalo (yellow card) 30' | Report | Aursnes 9' (yellow card) 49'; Ramos 15'; Morato (yellow card) 53'; Guedes 80' | Stadium: Estádio de São Miguel; Attendance: 9,701; Referee: Fábio Veríssimo (Leiria) |

| 26 January 2023 20 | Paços de Ferreira | 0–2 | Benfica | Paços de Ferreira |
| 20:15 WET (UTC±00:00) | | Report | Grimaldo 7'; João Mário 11'; Guedes (yellow card) 37'; Florentino (yellow card) 71' | Stadium: Estádio da Mata Real; Attendance: 8,060; Referee: Luís Godinho (Évora) |
Note: Match was brought forward.

| 31 January 2023 18 | Arouca | 0–3 | Benfica | Arouca |
| 21:15 WET (UTC±00:00) | Opoku (yellow card) 47'; Soro (yellow card) 73'; Ruiz (yellow card) 76' | Report | João Mário 23', 54'; A. Silva (yellow card) 50'; Musa 81' | Stadium: Estádio Municipal de Arouca; Attendance: 4,614; Referee: Rui Costa (Porto) |

| 4 February 2023 19 | Benfica | 3–0 | Casa Pia | Lisbon |
| 18:00 WET (UTC±00:00) | João Mário 35', 43'; Bah 71' | Report | Cuca (yellow card) 33' | Stadium: Estádio da Luz; Attendance: 58,763; Referee: André Narciso (Setúbal) |

| 20 February 2023 21 | Benfica | 3–1 | Boavista | Lisbon |
| 21:15 WET (UTC±00:00) | Gilberto 55'; João Mário (yellow card) 73'; Ramos 82'; Musa 90+2' | Report | Lourenço (yellow card) 15'; Camará (yellow card) 18'; Njie 58'; Sasso (yellow card) 72'; Gorré (yellow card) 77'; Onyemaechi (yellow card) 88' | Stadium: Estádio da Luz; Attendance: 56,413; Referee: Hélder Malheiro (Lisbon) |

| 25 February 2023 22 | Vizela | 0–2 | Benfica | Vizela |
| 20:30 WET (UTC±00:00) | Guzzo (yellow card) 16'; Claudemir (yellow card) 60'; Anderson (yellow card) 78' (yellow-red card) 86' | Report | Otamendi (yellow card) 18'; João Mário 38', 90+5' (pen.); A. Silva (yellow card) 42' | Stadium: Estádio do FC Vizela; Attendance: 5,872; Referee: Nuno Almeida (Algarve) |

| 3 March 2023 23 | Benfica | 2–0 | Famalicão | Lisbon |
| 21:15 WET (UTC±00:00) | Ramos 36', 90+3'; Otamendi (yellow card) 70' | Report | Youssouf (yellow card) 60'; Sá (yellow card) 73'; Aguirregabiria (yellow card) 78' | Stadium: Estádio da Luz; Attendance: 56,995; Referee: Artur Soares Dias (Porto) |

| 12 March 2023 24 | Marítimo | 0–3 | Benfica | Funchal |
| 18:00 WET (UTC±00:00) | Santos (yellow card) 29'; João Afonso (yellow card) 52'; Vidigal (yellow card) 72' | Report | Neres (yellow card) 43' (goal) 45+3', 57'; João Mário 50'; Aursnes (yellow card) 88' | Stadium: Estádio do Marítimo; Attendance: 10,547; Referee: Fábio Veríssimo (Leiria) |

| 18 March 2023 25 | Benfica | 5–1 | Vitória de Guimarães | Lisbon |
| 18:00 WET (UTC±00:00) | Ramos 12' (yellow card) 66'; João Mário 28' (pen.), 35'; D. Silva 68' (o.g.); A. Silva 89' | Report | Amaro (yellow card) 27'; André André (yellow card) 42'; André Silva 78'; Safira (yellow card) 86' | Stadium: Estádio da Luz; Attendance: 59,374; Referee: André Narciso (Setúbal) |

| 2 April 2023 26 | Rio Ave | 0–1 | Benfica | Vila do Conde |
| 18:00 WEST (UTC+01:00) | Patrick William (yellow card) 60'; Hernâni (yellow card) 83'; Pereira (yellow card) 90+3' | Report | Ramos 46' (yellow card) 70'; João Mário (yellow card) 58'; Vlachodimos (yellow card) 90+3' | Stadium: Estádio dos Arcos; Attendance: 4,134; Referee: Rui Costa (Porto) |

| 7 April 2023 27 | Benfica | 1–2 | Porto | Lisbon |
| 18:00 WEST (UTC+01:00) | Costa 10' (o.g.); Florentino (yellow card) 14'; Gilberto (yellow card) 49'; A. Silva (yellow card) 83' | Report | Uribe (yellow card) 22' (goal) 45'; Otávio (yellow card) 45+5'; Grujić (yellow card) 49'; Manafá (yellow card) 52'; Taremi 54' (yellow card) 87' | Stadium: Estádio da Luz; Attendance: 62,028; Referee: Artur Soares Dias (Porto) |

| 15 April 2023 28 | Chaves | 1–0 | Benfica | Chaves |
| 18:00 WEST (UTC+01:00) | Guima (yellow card) 28'; Monte (yellow card) 70'; Euller (yellow card) 86'; João Pedro (yellow card) 90+1'; Issah 90+4' | Report | | Stadium: Estádio Municipal de Chaves; Attendance: 8,297; Referee: João Pinheiro (Braga) |

| 23 April 2023 29 | Benfica | 1–0 | Estoril | Lisbon |
| 18:00 WEST (UTC+01:00) | Otamendi 44' (yellow card) 60'; Grimaldo (yellow card) 90+2' | Report | Siliki (yellow card) 90+3'; Geraldes (yellow card) 90+4' | Stadium: Estádio da Luz; Attendance: 58,062; Referee: Rui Costa (Porto) |

| 29 April 2023 30 | Gil Vicente | 0–2 | Benfica | Barcelos |
| 20:30 WEST (UTC+01:00) | Carraça (yellow card) 58'; Fernandes (yellow card) 84'; Depú (yellow card) 90+3' | Report | Chiquinho 74'; Vlachodimos (yellow card) 78'; Grimaldo 86' (pen.); Morato (yellow card) 90+2' | Stadium: Estádio Cidade de Barcelos; Attendance: 11,694; Referee: Fábio Veríssimo (Leiria) |

| 6 May 2023 31 | Benfica | 1–0 | Braga | Lisbon |
| 20:30 WEST (UTC+01:00) | Otamendi (yellow card) 35'; Neves (yellow card) 41'; R. Silva 67'; João Mário (yellow card) 86' | Report | Horta (yellow card) 45+5'; Siqueira (yellow card) 90'; Bruma (yellow card) 90+10'; Djaló (yellow card) 90+12' | Stadium: Estádio da Luz; Attendance: 60,289; Referee: Luís Godinho (Évora) |

| 13 May 2023 32 | Portimonense | 1–5 | Benfica | Portimão |
| 18:00 WEST (UTC+01:00) | Pedrão (yellow card) 34' (goal) 38'; Seck (yellow card) 74' | Report | Grimaldo 4'; Relvas 28' (o.g.); Chiquinho (yellow card) 32'; Ramos 45'; Musa 87', 89' | Stadium: Estádio Municipal de Portimão; Attendance: 4,404; Referee: Artur Soares Dias (Porto) |

| 21 May 2023 33 | Sporting CP | 2–2 | Benfica | Lisbon |
| 20:30 WEST (UTC+01:00) | Trincão 39'; Diomande 44' (yellow card) 48'; Coates (yellow card) 88' | Report | A. Silva (yellow card) 40'; Aursnes 71'; Chiquinho (yellow card) 80'; Neves 90+4' | Stadium: Estádio José Alvalade; Attendance: 39,348; Referee: João Pinheiro (Braga) |

| 27 May 2023 34 | Benfica | 3–0 | Santa Clara | Lisbon |
| 18:00 WEST (UTC+01:00) | Ramos 7'; R. Silva 28'; Grimaldo 60' (pen.) (yellow card) 61' | Report | Adriano (yellow card) 90+1' | Stadium: Estádio da Luz; Attendance: 64,012; Referee: Rui Costa (Porto) |

=== Taça de Portugal ===
| 15 October 2022 Third round | Caldas | 1–1 (a.e.t.) (3–5 p) | Benfica | Caldas da Rainha |
| 20:45 WEST (UTC+01:00) | Sousa (yellow card) 46'; Militão (yellow card) 66'; Marcelo (yellow card) 72'; Barreiras 74' (yellow card) 120+2' | | Florentino (yellow card) 22'; Musa 53'; Grimaldo (yellow card) 71'; Ristić (yellow card) 105' | Stadium: Campo da Mata; Referee: Claúdio Pereira (Aveiro) |
| | Penalties |
| | Clemente (penalty missed); Simões (penalty scored); Borges (penalty scored); Rodrigues (penalty scored) | | (penalty scored) Fernández; (penalty scored) Ristić; (penalty scored) Aursnes; (penalty scored) Chiquinho; (penalty scored) João Mário |

| 9 November 2022 Fourth round | Estoril | 0–1 | Benfica | Estoril |
| 20:45 WET (UTC±00:00) | Ndiaye (yellow card) 15'; Álvaro (yellow card) 39'; Geraldes (red card) 47'; Mexer (yellow card) 79' | | Neres (yellow card) 25' (goal) 66' | Stadium: Estádio António Coimbra da Mota; Referee: Fábio Veríssimo (Leiria) |

| 10 January 2023 Fifth round | Varzim | 0–2 | Benfica | Póvoa de Varzim |
| 20:45 WET (UTC±00:00) | Gonçalves (yellow card) 50'; Barbosa (yellow card) 61'; Teixeira (yellow card) 70'; Tovar (yellow card) 76' | | Grimaldo 4'; Fernández 78' (yellow card) 84' | Stadium: Estádio do Varzim SC; Attendance: ~7,000; Referee: Manuel Oliveira (Porto) |

| 9 February 2023 Quarter-finals | Braga | 1–1 (a.e.t.) (5–4 p) | Benfica | Braga |
| 20:30 WET (UTC±00:00) | Al-Musrati 36'; Račić (yellow card) 55'; Castro (yellow card) 88'; Niakaté (yellow card) 92'; Tormena (yellow card) 100'; Oliveira (yellow card) 106'; Banza (yellow card) 112' | | Guedes 15'; Bah (red card) 31'; Otamendi (yellow card) 83'; Vlachodimos (yellow card) 111'; Morato (yellow card) 115' (yellow-red card) 120' | Stadium: Estádio Municipal de Braga; Referee: Tiago Martins (Lisbon) |
| | Penalties |
| | R. Horta (penalty scored); Djaló (penalty scored); Castro (penalty scored); Oliveira (penalty scored); Al-Musrati (penalty scored) | | (penalty scored) João Mário; (penalty scored) Otamendi; (penalty scored) A. Silva; (penalty missed) Aursnes; (penalty scored) Grimaldo |

=== Taça da Liga ===
==== Group stage ====
| Pos | Team | Pld | W | D | L | GF | GA | GD | Pts | Qualification | MOR | BEN | EST | PEN |
|---|---|---|---|---|---|---|---|---|---|---|---|---|---|---|
| 1 | Moreirense | 3 | 2 | 1 | 0 | 7 | 4 | +3 | 7 | Advance to knockout phase | — | 1–1 | 4–2 | — |
| 2 | Benfica | 3 | 2 | 1 | 0 | 6 | 3 | +3 | 7 | | — | — | — | 2–0 |
| 3 | Estrela da Amadora | 3 | 0 | 1 | 2 | 5 | 8 | −3 | 1 | | — | 2–3 | — | 1–1 |
| 4 | Penafiel | 3 | 0 | 1 | 2 | 2 | 5 | −3 | 1 | | 1–2 | — | — | — |

Source: Liga Portugal
Rules for classification: Tiebreakers

| 20 November 2022 1 | Estrela da Amadora | 2–3 | Benfica | Leiria |
| 19:00 WET (UTC±00:00) | Omurwa (yellow card) 13'; Shinga (yellow card) 16'; Silva 21'; Gustavo Henrique (yellow card) 76' (goal) 90+5' | Report | Musa 12'; Gonçalves (yellow card) 20'; Chiquinho 28' (yellow card) 38'; João Victor (yellow card) 45'; Draxler 90' | Stadium: Estádio Dr. Magalhães Pessoa; Attendance: 6,899; Referee: Miguel Nogueira (Leiria) |

| 26 November 2022 2 | Benfica | 2–0 | Penafiel | Lisbon |
| 20:45 WET (UTC±00:00) | Gilberto 55'; Neres 56'; Pinho (yellow card) 90+2' | Report | Vaz (yellow card) 38'; Freitas (yellow card) 89' | Stadium: Estádio da Luz; Attendance: 43,263; Referee: André Narciso (Setúbal) |

| 17 December 2022 3 | Moreirense | 1–1 | Benfica | Moreira de Cónegos |
| 19:00 WET (UTC±00:00) | André Luis 24' (pen.); Gomes (yellow card) 39'; Franco (yellow card) 45+1'; Mané (yellow card) 48'; Pacheco (yellow card) 85' | Report | Chiquinho (yellow card) 33'; Ramos 43' | Stadium: Parque Joaquim de Almeida Freitas; Attendance: 4,339; Referee: Tiago Martins (Lisbon) |

=== UEFA Champions League ===
==== Third qualifying round ====
The draw for the third qualifying round was held on 18 July 2022.

| 2 August 2022 First leg | Benfica (Portugal) | 4–1 | (Denmark) Midtjylland | Lisbon, Portugal |
| 20:00 WEST (UTC+01:00) | Ramos 17', 33', 61'; Otamendi (yellow card) 22'; Fernández 40'; Morato (yellow card) 77' | Report | Sisto 78' (pen.) | Stadium: Estádio da Luz; Attendance: 53,346; Referee: Alejandro Hernández Hernández (Spain) |

| 9 August 2022 Second leg | Midtjylland (Denmark) | 1–3 (2–7 agg.) | (Portugal) Benfica | Randers, Denmark |
| 19:45 CEST (UTC+02:00) | Sisto 63'; Onyedika (yellow card) 69' | Report | Fernández 23'; Ramos (yellow card) 29'; R. Silva (yellow card) 40'; Araújo 56'; Gonçalves 88' | Stadium: Randers Stadium; Attendance: 5,111; Referee: Srđan Jovanović (Serbia) |

==== Play-off round ====
The draw for the play-off round was held on 2 August 2022.

| 17 August 2022 First leg | Dynamo Kyiv (Ukraine) | 0–2 | (Portugal) Benfica | Łódź, Poland |
| 21:00 CEST (UTC+02:00) | Andriyevskyi (yellow card) 40' | Report | Gilberto 9'; Ramos 37' | Stadium: Stadion Miejski im. Władysława Króla; Attendance: 16,450; Referee: Felix Zwayer (Germany) |

| 23 August 2022 Second leg | Benfica (Portugal) | 3–0 (5–0 agg.) | (Ukraine) Dynamo Kyiv | Lisbon, Portugal |
| 20:00 WEST (UTC+01:00) | Otamendi 27'; R. Silva 40'; Neres 42'; Musa (yellow card) 85' | Report | Shaparenko (yellow card) 81' | Stadium: Estádio da Luz; Attendance: 58,705; Referee: Clément Turpin (France) |

==== Group stage ====
The group stage draw was held on 25 August 2022.

| Pos | Team | Pld | W | D | L | GF | GA | GD | Pts | Qualification | BEN | PAR | JUV | MHA |
|---|---|---|---|---|---|---|---|---|---|---|---|---|---|---|
| 1 | (Portugal) Benfica | 6 | 4 | 2 | 0 | 16 | 7 | +9 | 14 (Note: Tied on head-to-head results, overall goal difference and overall goals scored. Overall away goals scored: Benfica 9, Paris Saint-Germain 6.) | Advance to knockout phase | — | 1–1 | 4–3 | 2–0 |
| 2 | (France) Paris Saint-Germain | 6 | 4 | 2 | 0 | 16 | 7 | +9 | 14 | Advance to knockout phase | 1–1 | — | 2–1 | 7–2 |
| 3 | (Italy) Juventus | 6 | 1 | 0 | 5 | 9 | 13 | −4 | 3 (Note: Tied on head-to-head results. Overall goal difference is used as the tiebreaker.) | Transfer to Europa League | 1–2 | 1–2 | — | 3–1 |
| 4 | (Israel) Maccabi Haifa | 6 | 1 | 0 | 5 | 7 | 21 | −14 | 3 | | 1–6 | 1–3 | 2–0 | — |

Source: UEFA
Rules for classification: Group stage tiebreakers
Notes:

| 6 September 2022 1 | Benfica (Portugal) | 2–0 | (Israel) Maccabi Haifa | Lisbon, Portugal |
| 20:00 WEST (UTC+01:00) | Ramos (yellow card) 45'; R. Silva 50'; Grimaldo 54' | Report | Lavi (yellow card) 58'; Seck (yellow card) 63' | Stadium: Estádio da Luz; Attendance: 55,161; Referee: Andreas Ekberg (Sweden) |

| 14 September 2022 2 | Juventus (Italy) | 1–2 | (Portugal) Benfica | Turin, Italy |
| 21:00 CEST (UTC+02:00) | Milik 4'; Miretti (yellow card) 42'; Perin (yellow card) 45'; Danilo (yellow card) 59'; Paredes (yellow card) 73' | Report | Bah (yellow card) 26'; João Mário 43' (pen.) (yellow card) 45'; Neres 55'; Florentino (yellow card) 85' | Stadium: Juventus Stadium; Attendance: 34,015; Referee: Felix Zwayer (Germany) |

| 5 October 2022 3 | Benfica (Portugal) | 1–1 | (France) Paris Saint-Germain | Lisbon, Portugal |
| 20:00 WEST (UTC+01:00) | Pereira 41' (o.g.); Fernández (yellow card) 45'; Ramos (yellow card) 70' | Report | Messi 22'; Fabián (yellow card) 90+1'; Neymar (yellow card) 90+1'; Verratti (yellow card) 90+4' | Stadium: Estádio da Luz; Attendance: 62,295; Referee: Jesús Gil Manzano (Spain) |

| 11 October 2022 4 | Paris Saint-Germain (France) | 1–1 | (Portugal) Benfica | Paris, France |
| 21:00 CEST (UTC+02:00) | Sarabia (yellow card) 29'; Mbappé 40' (pen.); Verratti (yellow card) 61' | Report | Otamendi (yellow card) 21'; João Mário (yellow card) 43' (goal) 62' (pen.); Florentino (yellow card) 45+3'; Fernández (yellow card) 69'; Gilberto (yellow card) 83' | Stadium: Parc des Princes; Attendance: 46,435; Referee: Michael Oliver (England) |

| 25 October 2022 5 | Benfica (Portugal) | 4–3 | (Italy) Juventus | Lisbon, Portugal |
| 20:00 WEST (UTC+01:00) | A. Silva 17'; João Mário 28' (pen.); R. Silva 35', 50'; Fernández (yellow card) 84' | Report | Kean 21'; Danilo (yellow card) 62'; Milik 77'; McKennie 79' | Stadium: Estádio da Luz; Attendance: 60,131; Referee: Srđan Jovanović (Serbia) |

| 2 November 2022 6 | Maccabi Haifa (Israel) | 1–6 | (Portugal) Benfica | Haifa, Israel |
| 22:00 IST (UTC+02:00) | Chery 26' (pen.); Abu Fani (yellow card) 85'; Menachem (yellow card) 89'; Atzili (yellow card) 90+3' | Report | Ramos 20'; Neres (yellow card) 45+3'; Musa 59'; Grimaldo 69'; R. Silva 73'; Araújo 88'; João Mário 90+2' | Stadium: Sammy Ofer Stadium; Attendance: 30,464; Referee: Anthony Taylor (England) |

==== Knockout phase ====
===== Round of 16 =====
The draw for the round of 16 was held on 7 November 2022.

| 15 February 2023 First leg | Club Brugge (Belgium) | 0–2 | (Portugal) Benfica | Bruges, Belgium |
| 21:00 CET (UTC+01:00) | Odoi (yellow card) 9'; Sowah (yellow card) 29' | Report | Otamendi (yellow card) 43'; João Mário 51' (pen.); Neres 88' | Stadium: Jan Breydel Stadium; Attendance: 24,136; Referee: Davide Massa (Italy) |

| 7 March 2023 Second leg | Benfica (Portugal) | 5–1 (7–1 agg.) | (Belgium) Club Brugge | Lisbon, Portugal |
| 20:00 WET (UTC±00:00) | Otamendi (yellow card) 29'; R. Silva 38'; Ramos 45+2', 57'; João Mário 71' (pen.); Neres 77' | Report | Yaremchuk (yellow card) 17'; Lang (yellow card) 20'; Sylla (yellow card) 43'; Meijer (yellow card) 48' (goal) 87' | Stadium: Estádio da Luz; Attendance: 60,960; Referee: Halil Umut Meler (Turkey) |

===== Quarter-finals =====
The draw for the quarter-finals was held on 17 March 2023.

| 11 April 2023 First leg | Benfica (Portugal) | 0–2 | (Italy) Inter Milan | Lisbon, Portugal |
| 20:00 WEST (UTC+01:00) | A. Silva (yellow card) 22' | Report | Brozović (yellow card) 50'; Barella 51'; Lukaku 82' (pen.); Džeko (yellow card) 83' | Stadium: Estádio da Luz; Attendance: 62,594; Referee: Michael Oliver (England) |

| 19 April 2023 Second leg | Inter Milan (Italy) | 3–3 (5–3 agg.) | (Portugal) Benfica | Milan, Italy |
| 21:00 CEST (UTC+02:00) | Barella 14'; Martínez 65'; Correa 78' | Report | Aursnes 38'; R. Silva (yellow card) 49'; Musa (yellow card) 81' (goal) 90+5'; A. Silva 86'; Neres (yellow card) 90+5' | Stadium: San Siro; Attendance: 75,380; Referee: Carlos del Cerro Grande (Spain) |

== Statistics ==
=== Appearances and goals ===
| No. | Pos | Nat | Player | Total | | Primeira Liga | | Taça de Portugal | | Taça da Liga | | Champions League | |
| No. | Pos | Nat | Player | Apps | Goals | Apps | Goals | Apps | Goals | Apps | Goals | Apps | Goals |
Goalkeepers
| 24 | GK | (Portugal) POR | Samuel Soares | 1 | 0 | 0+1 | 0 | 0 | 0 | 0 | 0 | 0 | 0 |
| 99 | GK | (Greece) GRE | Odysseas Vlachodimos | 54 | 0 | 34 | 0 | 3 | 0 | 3 | 0 | 14 | 0 |
Defenders
| 2 | DF | (Brazil) BRA | Gilberto | 36 | 4 | 8+13 | 2 | 1+2 | 0 | 2+1 | 1 | 6+3 | 1 |
| 3 | DF | (Spain) ESP | Álex Grimaldo | 54 | 8 | 33 | 5 | 4 | 1 | 3 | 0 | 14 | 2 |
| 4 | DF | (Brazil) BRA | Lucas Veríssimo | 6 | 0 | 0+2 | 0 | 1+1 | 0 | 0 | 0 | 0+2 | 0 |
| 6 | DF | (Denmark) DEN | Alexander Bah | 42 | 1 | 21+7 | 1 | 3 | 0 | 1 | 0 | 8+2 | 0 |
| 23 | DF | (Serbia) SRB | Mihailo Ristić | 10 | 1 | 1+6 | 1 | 0+2 | 0 | 0+1 | 0 | 0 | 0 |
| 30 | DF | (Argentina) ARG | Nicolás Otamendi | 46 | 2 | 31 | 1 | 2 | 0 | 0 | 0 | 13 | 1 |
| 66 | DF | (Portugal) POR | António Silva | 44 | 5 | 30 | 3 | 3 | 0 | 1 | 0 | 10 | 2 |
| 91 | DF | (Brazil) BRA | Morato | 20 | 1 | 7+2 | 1 | 1+1 | 0 | 2+1 | 0 | 5+1 | 0 |
Midfielders
| 7 | MF | (Brazil) BRA | David Neres | 48 | 12 | 22+9 | 6 | 3 | 1 | 2 | 1 | 7+5 | 4 |
| 8 | MF | (Norway) NOR | Fredrik Aursnes | 42 | 3 | 24+4 | 2 | 3 | 0 | 1 | 0 | 7+3 | 1 |
| 15 | MF | (Portugal) POR | Gonçalo Guedes | 15 | 2 | 4+8 | 1 | 1 | 1 | 0 | 0 | 0+2 | 0 |
| 20 | MF | (Portugal) POR | João Mário | 51 | 23 | 33 | 17 | 3+1 | 0 | 0 | 0 | 14 | 6 |
| 21 | MF | (Norway) NOR | Andreas Schjelderup | 2 | 0 | 0+1 | 0 | 0 | 0 | 0 | 0 | 0+1 | 0 |
| 22 | MF | (Portugal) POR | Chiquinho | 44 | 2 | 14+11 | 1 | 2+2 | 0 | 3 | 1 | 5+7 | 0 |
| 27 | MF | (Portugal) POR | Rafa Silva | 47 | 14 | 26+2 | 8 | 1+1 | 0 | 3 | 0 | 14 | 6 |
| 61 | MF | (Portugal) POR | Florentino | 54 | 0 | 25+8 | 0 | 3+1 | 0 | 3 | 0 | 14 | 0 |
| 73 | MF | (Italy) ITA | Cher Ndour | 1 | 0 | 0+1 | 0 | 0 | 0 | 0 | 0 | 0 | 0 |
| 87 | MF | (Portugal) POR | João Neves | 20 | 1 | 6+11 | 1 | 0 | 0 | 0 | 0 | 0+3 | 0 |
| 93 | MF | (Germany) GER | Julian Draxler | 19 | 2 | 4+6 | 1 | 2 | 0 | 3+1 | 1 | 0+3 | 0 |
| 96 | MF | (Portugal) POR | Diego Moreira | 1 | 0 | 0 | 0 | 0 | 0 | 0 | 0 | 0+1 | 0 |
Forwards
| 19 | FW | (Denmark) DEN | Casper Tengstedt | 4 | 0 | 0+4 | 0 | 0 | 0 | 0 | 0 | 0 | 0 |
| 33 | FW | (Croatia) CRO | Petar Musa | 41 | 11 | 2+28 | 7 | 1+1 | 1 | 2+1 | 1 | 0+6 | 2 |
| 88 | FW | (Portugal) POR | Gonçalo Ramos | 48 | 27 | 31 | 19 | 1+1 | 0 | 1 | 1 | 14 | 7 |
Players who made an appearance and/or had a squad number but left the team.
| 5 | DF | (Belgium) BEL | Jan Vertonghen | 1 | 0 | 0+1 | 0 | 0 | 0 | 0 | 0 | 0 | 0 |
| 9 | FW | (Ukraine) UKR | Roman Yaremchuk | 5 | 0 | 0+2 | 0 | 0 | 0 | 0 | 0 | 0+3 | 0 |
| 11 | MF | (France) FRA | Soualiho Meïté | 0 | 0 | 0 | 0 | 0 | 0 | 0 | 0 | 0 | 0 |
| 13 | MF | (Argentina) ARG | Enzo Fernández | 29 | 4 | 17 | 1 | 3 | 1 | 0 | 0 | 9 | 2 |
| 17 | MF | (Portugal) POR | Diogo Gonçalves | 20 | 1 | 2+8 | 0 | 0+2 | 0 | 1+1 | 0 | 0+6 | 1 |
| 18 | FW | (Brazil) BRA | Rodrigo Pinho | 7 | 0 | 0+2 | 0 | 1 | 0 | 0+2 | 0 | 0+2 | 0 |
| 25 | DF | (United States) USA | John Brooks | 5 | 0 | 0+2 | 0 | 1 | 0 | 1+1 | 0 | 0 | 0 |
| 28 | MF | (Germany) GER | Julian Weigl | 3 | 0 | 0+2 | 0 | 0 | 0 | 0 | 0 | 0+1 | 0 |
| 31 | MF | (Portugal) POR | Gil Dias | 2 | 0 | 0 | 0 | 0+1 | 0 | 0+1 | 0 | 0 | 0 |
| 34 | DF | (Portugal) POR | André Almeida | 0 | 0 | 0 | 0 | 0 | 0 | 0 | 0 | 0 | 0 |
| 38 | DF | (Brazil) BRA | João Victor | 3 | 0 | 0 | 0 | 0+1 | 0 | 2 | 0 | 0 | 0 |
| 39 | FW | (Portugal) POR | Henrique Araújo | 14 | 2 | 0+5 | 0 | 0+2 | 0 | 0+2 | 0 | 0+5 | 2 |
| 55 | MF | (Portugal) POR | Paulo Bernardo | 2 | 0 | 0 | 0 | 0 | 0 | 0+1 | 0 | 0+1 | 0 |
| 77 | GK | (Brazil) BRA | Helton Leite | 1 | 0 | 0 | 0 | 1 | 0 | 0 | 0 | 0 | 0 |
