= 2020–21 Rio Ave F.C. season =

Rio Ave
2020–21 season
- President: António Silva Campos
- Head coach: Carlos Carvalhal
- Stadium: Estádio dos Arcos
- Primeira Liga: 16th (relegated via play-offs)
- Taça de Portugal: Fifth round
- UEFA Europa League: Play-off round
- Top goalscorer: League: Carlos Mané (6); All: Carlos Mané (6)
Home colours	Away colours	Third colours

The 2020–21 season was the 82nd season in existence of Rio Ave Futebol Clube and the club's 13th consecutive season in the top flight of Portuguese football. In addition to the domestic league, Rio Ave participated in this season's editions of the Taça de Portugal, and the UEFA Europa League. The season covered the period from July 2020 to 30 June 2021.

== Players ==
=== First-team squad ===
As of 3 February 2021

Note: Flags indicate national team as defined under FIFA eligibility rules; some limited exceptions apply. Players may hold more than one non-FIFA nationality.

No.	Pos.	Nation	Player
1	GK	POL	Paweł Kieszek
4	DF	POR	Nélson Monte
5	MF	BRA	Filipe Augusto
6	DF	CRO	Toni Borevković
7	FW	ANG	Gelson Dala
8	MF	POR	Tarantini (captain)
9	FW	BRA	Júnior Brandão (on loan from Ludogorets)
10	FW	ANG	Anderson Cruz
11	MF	POR	Francisco Geraldes
12	DF	BRA	Júnio
16	MF	POR	Guga
17	DF	POR	Fábio Coentrão
18	MF	GBS	Pelé (on loan from Monaco)
19	FW	BRA	Ronan
20	DF	POR	Costinha

No.	Pos.	Nation	Player
21	FW	POR	Carlos Mané
22	GK	BRA	Léo
23	MF	CRO	Nikola Jambor
24	DF	POR	Pedro Amaral
25	DF	POR	Ivo Pinto
28	DF	NZL	Nando Pijnaker
33	DF	BRA	Aderllan Santos
36	DF	BRA	Sávio
40	MF	JPN	Ryotaro Meshino (on loan from Manchester City)
45	FW	BRA	Leandro Silva
64	FW	POR	Rafael Camacho (on loan from Sporting CP)
70	FW	BRA	Gabrielzinho
74	GK	BRA	Magrão
77	FW	POR	André Pereira

=== Other players under contract ===
Note: Flags indicate national team as defined under FIFA eligibility rules; some limited exceptions apply. Players may hold more than one non-FIFA nationality.

No.	Pos.	Nation	Player
37	FW	POR	Manuel Namora
80	MF	POR	Diogo Teixeira
89	FW	GHA	Said Ahmed Said

No.	Pos.	Nation	Player
91	MF	POR	Nuno Silva
92	DF	POR	Luca

=== Out on loan ===
Note: Flags indicate national team as defined under FIFA eligibility rules; some limited exceptions apply. Players may hold more than one non-FIFA nationality.

No.	Pos.	Nation	Player
—	GK	POR	Carlos Alves (at Trofense until 30 June 2021)
—	DF	BRA	Matheus Reis (at Sporting CP until 30 June 2021)

No.	Pos.	Nation	Player
—	MF	POR	Rúben Gonçalves (at Vilafranquense until 30 June 2021)

== Pre-season and friendlies ==
Win Draw Loss

2 September 2020 Friendly	Paços de Ferreira (Portugal)	1–2	(Portugal) Rio Ave	Paços de Ferreira
10:30 WEST (UTC+1)				Stadium: Estádio da Mata Real

== Competitions ==
=== Overview ===
Competition	First match	Last match	Starting round	Final position	Record							
Competition	First match	Last match	Starting round	Final position	Pld	W	D	L	GF	GA	GD	Win %
Primeira Liga	20 September 2020	19 May 2021	Matchday 1	16th	34	7	13	14	25	40	−15	20.59
Primeira Liga relegation play-offs	26 May 2021	30 May 2021	First leg	Second leg	2	0	0	2	0	5	−5	0.00
Taça de Portugal	22 November 2020	12 January 2021	Third round	Fifth round	3	2	0	1	5	4	+1	66.67
Europa League	17 September 2020	1 October 2020	Second qualifying round	Play-off round	3	1	2	0	5	3	+2	33.33
Total					42	10	15	17	35	52	−17	23.81

Source: Soccerway

=== Primeira Liga ===
==== League table ====
Pos	Team	Pld	W	D	L	GF	GA	GD	Pts	Qualification or relegation
14	Portimonense	34	9	8	17	34	41	−7	35 (Note: Portimonense are ranked ahead of Marítimo on head-to-head points: Portimonense 4, Marítimo 1.)	
15	Marítimo	34	10	5	19	27	47	−20	35	
16	Rio Ave (R)	34	7	13	14	25	40	−15	34	Qualification for the Relegation play-offs
17	Farense (R)	34	7	10	17	31	48	−17	31	Relegation to Liga Portugal 2
18	Nacional (R)	34	6	7	21	30	59	−29	25	Relegation to Liga Portugal 2

Source: Liga Portugal
Rules for classification: 1) Points; 2) Head-to-head points; 3) Head-to-head goal difference; 4) Head-to-head away goals scored; 5) Goal difference; 6) Matches won; 7) Goals scored; 8) Play-off.
(R) Relegated

==== Results summary ====
Overall								Home						Away					
Pld	W	D	L	GF	GA	GD	Pts	W	D	L	GF	GA	GD	W	D	L	GF	GA	GD
34	7	13	14	25	40	−15	34	4	6	7	12	18	−6	3	7	7	13	22	−9

Source: Liga Portugal

==== Results by round ====
Round	1	2	3	4	5	6	7	8	9	10	11	12	13	14	15	16	17	18	19	20	21	22	23	24	25	26	27	28	29	30	31	32	33	34
Ground	A	H	A	H	A	H	A	A	H	A	H	A	H	A	H	A	H	H	A	H	A	H	A	H	H	A	H	A	H	A	H	A	H	A
Result	D	D	D	L	W	W	D	L	D	L	L	L	W	D	L	L	D	W	W	L	L	W	D	D	L	D	D	L	D	D	L	L	L	W
Position	10	11	13	16	10	7	7	9	9	9	13	16	10	10	10	12	14	10	9	9	11	9	9	9	11	11	13	14	14	15	15	15	17	16

Source: Liga Portugal
A = Away; H = Home; W = Win; D = Draw; L = Loss

==== Matches ====
The league fixtures were announced on 28 August 2020.

20 September 2020 1	Tondela	1–1	Rio Ave	Tondela
21:00 WEST (UTC+1)	Alves 10'; Štrkalj (yellow card) 87'	Report	Meshino 90+2'	Stadium: Estádio João Cardoso; Attendance: 0 (Note: The match was played behind closed doors due to the COVID-19 pandemic in Portugal.); Referee: Rui Costa

27 September 2020 2	Rio Ave	0–0	Vitória de Guimarães	Vila do Conde
21:00 WEST (UTC+1)	Santos (yellow card) 33'; Jambor (yellow card) 61'	Report	Sílvio (yellow card) 58'; Janvier (yellow card) 65'; Fernandes (yellow card) 77'	Stadium: Estádio dos Arcos; Attendance: 0 Referee: Tiago Martins

4 October 2020 3	Famalicão	1–1	Rio Ave	Vila Nova de Famalicão
18:30 WEST (UTC+1)	Lameiras 22'; Jordão (yellow card) 47'; Campana (yellow card) 56'	Report	Aderlan Santos 78'	Stadium: Estádio Municipal 22 de Junho; Attendance: 0 Referee: Artur Soares Dias

18 October 2020 4	Rio Ave	0–3	Benfica	Vila do Conde
20:00 WEST (UTC+1)	Pinto (yellow card) 81'	Report	Waldschmidt 6', 45+4'; Gilberto (yellow card) 78'; Otamendi (yellow card) 80'; Gabriel 84'; Weigl (yellow card) 90+2'	Stadium: Estádio dos Arcos; Attendance: 0 Referee: João Pinheiro

25 October 2020 5	Farense	0–1	Rio Ave	Faro
15:00 WET (UTC±0)	Falcão (yellow card) 42'; Isidoro (yellow card) 65'; Mansilla (yellow card) 79'; Oudrhiri (yellow card) 84'	Report	Mané 20'; Filipe Augusto (yellow card) 25'; Ronan (yellow card) 32'; Borevković (yellow card) 46'; Diego Lopes (yellow card) 79'; Pelé (yellow card) 79'; Amaral (yellow card) 84'	Stadium: Estádio de São Luís; Attendance: 0 Referee: Manuel Oliveira

31 October 2020 6	Rio Ave	2–0	Moreirense	Vila do Conde
18:00 WET (UTC±0)	Piazon 14', 83' (pen.); Pelé (yellow card) 40'	Report	Pacheco (yellow card) 20'; Ferraresi (yellow card) 32'; Soares (yellow card) 57'; Vitória (yellow card) 79'	Stadium: Estádio dos Arcos; Attendance: 0 Referee: Iancu Vasilica

6 November 2020 7	Belenenses	0–0	Rio Ave	Oeiras
20:30 WET (UTC±0)	Henriques (yellow card) 45+1'; Taira (yellow card) 77'	Report	Borevković (yellow card) 15'; Santos (yellow card) 56'	Stadium: Estádio Nacional; Attendance: 0 Referee: Fábio Veríssimo

29 November 2020 8	Gil Vicente	2–0	Rio Ave	Barcelos
15:00 WET (UTC±0)	Augusto 18' (o.g.); Afonso (yellow card) 33'; Lourency 90+5'	Report	Santos (yellow card) 66'	Stadium: Estádio Cidade de Barcelos; Attendance: 0 Referee: Luís Godinho

6 December 2020 9	Rio Ave	0–0	Boavista	Vila do Conde
17:30 WET (UTC±0)	Geraldes (yellow card) 30'; Mané (yellow card) 38'	Report		Stadium: Estádio dos Arcos; Attendance: 0 Referee: João Bento

22 December 2020 10	Braga	3–0	Rio Ave	Braga
20:15 WET (UTC±0)	Horta 43'; Tormena (yellow card) 60'; Fransérgio 62'; Paulinho 88'	Report		Stadium: Estádio Municipal de Braga; Attendance: 0 Referee: João Pinheiro

28 December 2020 11	Rio Ave	1–3	Marítimo	Vila do Conde
18:45 WET (UTC±0)	Borevković (yellow card) 13'; Diego Lopes 14'; Tarantini (yellow card) 36'; Pelé (yellow card) 67'	Report	Zainadine (yellow card) 43'; Joel 50', 63'; Marcelo 75'; Jean (yellow card) 90+2'	Stadium: Estádio dos Arcos; Attendance: 0 Referee: Gustavo Correira

3 January 2021 12	Paços de Ferreira	2–0	Rio Ave	Paços de Ferreira
19:00 WET (UTC±0)	Douglas 24', 56'	Report		Stadium: Estádio da Mata Real; Attendance: 0 Referee: Hugo Miguel

8 January 2021 13	Rio Ave	3–0	Portimonense	Vila do Conde
21:00 WET (UTC±0)	Pelé 51'; Meshino 54'; Mané 78'	Report	Moufi (yellow card) 50'; Maurício (yellow card) 85'; Fernando (yellow card) 86'	Stadium: Estádio dos Arcos; Attendance: 0 Referee: Luís Godinho

15 January 2021 14	Sporting CP	1–1	Rio Ave	Lisbon
18:30 WET (UTC±0)	Plata (yellow card) 7'; João Mário (yellow card) 24'; Gonçalves 42'; Tabata (yellow card) 87'	Report	Amaral (yellow card) 15'; Coentrão (yellow card) 25'; Gelson 61'; Tarantini (yellow card) 69'; Gabrielzinho (yellow card) 69'; Rodrigues (yellow card) 83'; Pereira (yellow card) 90+4'	Stadium: Estádio José Alvalade; Attendance: 0 Referee: Hélder Malheiro

25 January 2021 15	Rio Ave	1–2	Santa Clara	Vila do Conde
16:30 WET (UTC±0)	Meshino 26'	Report	Carlos 23'; Morita 89'	Stadium: Estádio dos Arcos; Attendance: 0 Referee: Miguel Nogueira

1 February 2021 16	Porto	2–0	Rio Ave	Porto
19:00 WET (UTC±0)	Díaz 44'; Evanilson 74'; Uribe (yellow card) 78'	Report	Ronan (yellow card) 38'; Pinto (yellow card) 72'	Stadium: Estádio do Dragão; Attendance: 0 Referee: Nuno Almeida

5 February 2021 17	Rio Ave	0–0	Nacional	Vila do Conde
17:00 WET (UTC±0)	Tarantini (yellow card) 34'; Coentrão (yellow card) 55'	Report	Azouni (yellow card) 50'; Piscitelli (yellow card) 90+2'	Stadium: Estádio dos Arcos; Attendance: 0 Referee: Iancu Vasilica

9 February 2021 18	Rio Ave	2–1	Tondela	Vila do Conde
17:00 WET (UTC±0)	Borevković (yellow card) 5'; Santos (yellow card) 39'; Mané 59'; Camacho 64'; Pelé (yellow card) 87'; Dala (yellow card) 88'	Report	Medioub (yellow card) 11'; Murillo 31'; Agra (yellow card) 82'	Stadium: Estádio dos Arcos; Attendance: 0 Referee: Vítor Ferreira

13 February 2021 19	Vitória de Guimarães	1–3	Rio Ave	Guimarães
18:00 WET (UTC±0)	Quaresma (yellow card) 58', (goal) 70'; Fernandes (yellow card) 85'	Report	Mané 23'; Camacho 32'; Gelson 74'; Pinto (yellow card) 87'; Amaral (yellow card) 89'	Stadium: Estádio D. Afonso Henriques; Attendance: 0 Referee: Gustavo Correia

21 February 2021 20	Rio Ave	0–1	Famalicão	Vila do Conde
15:00 WET (UTC±0)	Monte (red card) 29'; Augusto (yellow card) 59'	Report	Tavares (yellow card) 25'; Ugarte 40'; Queirós (yellow card) 45+1'; Vinagre (yellow card) 52'	Stadium: Estádio dos Arcos; Attendance: 0 Referee: Hugo Silva

1 March 2021 21	Benfica	2–0	Rio Ave	Lisbon
19:00 WET (UTC±0)	Seferovic 59'; Silva (yellow card) 72'; Pizzi 78'	Report		Stadium: Estádio da Luz; Attendance: 0 Referee: Nuno Almeida

7 March 2021 22	Rio Ave	2–0	Farense	Vila do Conde
20:00 WET (UTC±0)				Stadium: Estádio dos Arcos

14 March 2021 23	Moreirense	1–1	Rio Ave	Braga
15:00 WEST (UTC+01:00)		Report		Stadium: Parque de Jogos Comendador Joaquim de Almeida Freitas; Attendance: 0 Referee: Fábio Melo

21 March 2021 24	Rio Ave	0–0	Belenenses SAD	Vila do Conde
15:00 WEST (UTC+1)				Stadium: Estádio dos Arcos; Referee: Gustavo Correia

3 April 2021 25	Rio Ave	0–2	Gil Vicente	Vila do Conde
18:00 WEST (UTC+1)				Stadium: Estádio dos Arcos; Referee: Hélder Malheiro

10 April 2021 26	Boavista	3–3	Rio Ave	Porto
15:30 WEST (UTC+1)		Report		Stadium: Estádio do Bessa; Attendance: 0 Referee: André Narciso

17 April 2021 27	Rio Ave	0–0	Braga	Vila do Conde
20:30 WEST (UTC+1)	Filipe Augusto (yellow card) 35'; Amaral (yellow card) 41'; Santos (yellow card) 61'; Gelson (red card) 80'	Report	Sequeira (yellow card) 30'; Zé Carlos (yellow card) 69'	Stadium: Estádio dos Arcos; Attendance: 0 Referee: Nuno Almeida

21 April 2021 28	Marítimo	1–0	Rio Ave	Funchal
17:00 WEST (UTC+1)	Tagueu 12'	Report		Stadium: Estádio dos Barreiros; Attendance: 0 Referee: Hélder Malheiro

25 April 2021 29	Rio Ave	1–1	Paços de Ferreira	Vila do Conde
17:30 WET (UTC±0)	Borevković (yellow card) 34'; Pedro Amaral (yellow card) 36'; Fábio Coentrão 49'; Ivo Pinto (red card) 81'	Report	Zé Uilton 31'; Pedro Rebocho (yellow card) 70'	Stadium: Estádio dos Arcos; Attendance: 0 Referee: Manuel António Rodrigues Oliveira

1 May 2021 30	Portimonense	0–0	Rio Ave	Portimão
18:00 WEST (UTC+1)		Report		Stadium: Estádio Municipal de Portimão; Attendance: 0 Referee: João Pinheiro

5 May 2021 31	Rio Ave	0–2	Sporting CP	Vila do Conde
21:15 WEST (UTC+1)	Filipe Augusto (yellow card) 23'; Santos (yellow card) 38'; Tarantini (red card) 62'; Coentrão (yellow card) 65'; Brandão (yellow card) 90+4'	Report	Mendes (yellow card) 26'; Gonçalves 34' (pen.); Feddal (yellow card) 42'; Paulinho 63'; Palhinha (yellow card) 74'; Neto (yellow card) 90+3'; Coates (yellow card) 90+4'	Stadium: Estádio dos Arcos; Attendance: 0 Referee: Fábio Veríssimo

11 May 2021 32	Santa Clara	1–0	Rio Ave	Ponta Delgada
16:00 WEST (UTC+1)	Mansur (yellow card) 38'; Villanueva (yellow card) 45+1'; Carlos 52'; Allano (yellow card) 69'; Crysan (yellow card) 90+3'	Report	Guga (yellow card) 47'; Fábio Coentrão (yellow card) 73'; Meshino (yellow card) 79'; Filipe Augusto (yellow card) 84'	Stadium: Estádio de São Miguel; Attendance: 0 Referee: Hugo Miguel

15 May 2021 33	Rio Ave	0–3	Porto	Vila do Conde
20:30 WEST (UTC+1)	Borevković (yellow card) 31'; Amaral (yellow card) 83'; Gabrielzinho (yellow card) 86'	Report	Martínez 56'; Díaz 59'; Oliveira 68'; Uribe (yellow card) 88'	Stadium: Estádio dos Arcos; Attendance: 0 Referee: Rui Costa

19 May 2021 34	Nacional	1–2	Rio Ave	Funchal
20:00 WEST (UTC+1)		Report		Stadium: Estádio da Madeira; Attendance: 0 Referee: Artur Soares Dias

==== Relegation play-offs ====
26 May 2021 First leg	Arouca	3–0	Rio Ave	Arouca
21:45	Pité 43'; Sema Velázquez 58'; André Silva 75'	Report		Stadium: Estádio Municipal de Arouca; Attendance: 0 Referee: João Pinheiro

30 May 2021 Second leg	Rio Ave	0–2 (0–5 agg.)	Arouca	Vila do Conde
19:00		Report	Arsénio 32'; Sema Velázquez 59'	Stadium: Estádio dos Arcos; Attendance: 0 Referee: Hugo Miguel

=== Taça de Portugal ===
22 November 2020 Third round	Monção	1–2	Rio Ave	Monção
14:30 WET (UTC±0)		Report		Stadium: Campo Manuel Lima; Attendance: 0 Referee: Manuel Mota

12 December 2020 Fourth round	Rio Ave	2–1	Famalicão	Vila do Conde
15:00 WET (UTC±0)	Dala 11'; Lopes (yellow card) 28', (goal) 74'; Santos (yellow card) 49'; Augusto (yellow card) 82'; Tarantini (yellow card) 87'; Pereira (yellow card) 90+6'	Report	Herrera (yellow card) 39'; João Neto (yellow card) 51'; Babić (yellow card) 67'; Dias 79'	Stadium: Estádio dos Arcos; Attendance: 0 Referee: Tiago Martins

12 January 2021 Fifth round	Rio Ave	1–2	Estoril	Vila do Conde
14:00 WET (UTC±0)	Gelson 65'	Report	Yakubu 14'; Vidigal 31'	Stadium: Estádio dos Arcos; Attendance: 0 Referee: Artur Soares Dias

=== UEFA Europa League ===
17 September 2020 Second qualifying round	Borac Banja Luka (Bosnia and Herzegovina)	0–2	(Portugal) Rio Ave	Banja Luka, Bosnia and Herzegovina
20:00 CEST (UTC+2)		Report	Tarantini 90'; Jambor 90+6'	Stadium: City Stadium; Attendance: 0 Referee: Peter Kjærsgaard (Denmark)

24 September 2020 Third qualifying round	Beşiktaş (Turkey)	1–1 (a.e.t.) (2–4 p)	(Portugal) Rio Ave	Istanbul, Turkey
20:00 TRT (UTC+3)	Yalçın 15'; Özyakup (yellow card) 19'; Montero (yellow card) 72'; Uysal (yellow card) 98'; Larin (yellow card) 116'; Mensah (yellow card) 116'	Report	Augusto (yellow card) 47'; Tarantini (yellow card) 74'; Moreira 85', (yellow card) 117'; Geraldes (yellow card) 88'; Aderlan Santos (yellow card) 120+1'	Stadium: Vodafone Park; Attendance: 0 Referee: Daniel Siebert (Germany)
	Penalties
	Mensah (penalty scored); Töre (penalty scored); Welinton (penalty missed); Larin (penalty missed)		(penalty scored) Moreira; (penalty scored) Santos; (penalty scored) Jambor; (penalty scored) Reis

1 October 2020 Play-off round	Rio Ave (Portugal)	2–2 (a.e.t.) (8–9 p)	(Italy) Milan	Vila do Conde, Portugal
20:00 WEST (UTC+1)	Borevković (yellow card) 15' (yellow-red card) 120+1'; Moreira (yellow card) 41'; Santos (yellow card) 47'; Filipe Augusto (yellow card) 65'; Tarantini (yellow card) 68'; Geraldes 72'; Gelson 91'	Report	Saelemaekers 51'; Hernandez (yellow card) 61'; Leão (yellow card) 98'; Kjær (yellow card) 113'; Çalhanoğlu 120+2' (pen.)	Stadium: Estádio dos Arcos; Attendance: 0 Referee: Jesús Gil Manzano (Spain)
	Penalties
	Geraldes (penalty scored); Santos (penalty scored); Jambor (penalty scored); Piazon (penalty scored); Filipe Augusto (penalty scored); Gelson (penalty scored); Gabrielzinho (penalty scored); Monte (penalty missed); Pinto (penalty scored); Kieszek (penalty missed); Geraldes (penalty missed); Santos (penalty missed)		(penalty scored) Bennacer; (penalty scored) Kjær; (penalty scored) Hernandez; (penalty scored) Díaz; (penalty scored) Çalhanoğlu; (penalty scored) Calabria; (penalty scored) Tonali; (penalty missed) Colombo; (penalty scored) Leão; (penalty missed) Donnarumma; (penalty missed) Bennacer; (penalty scored) Kjær

== Statistics ==
=== Goalscorers ===
As of 6 November 2020

Rank	No.	Pos	Nat	Name	Primeira Liga	Taça de Portugal	Taça da Liga	Europa League	Total
1	14	MF	(Brazil)	Lucas Piazon	2	0	0	0	2
2	33	DF	(Brazil)	Aderlan Santos	1	0	0	0	1
2	8	MF	(Portugal)	Tarantini	0	0	0	1	1
2	11	MF	(Portugal)	Francisco Geraldes	0	0	0	1	1
2	23	MF	(Croatia)	Nikola Jambor	0	0	0	1	1
2	40	MF	(Japan)	Ryotaro Meshino	1	0	0	0	1
2	7	FW	(Angola)	Gelson	0	0	0	1	1
2	9	FW	(Portugal)	Bruno Moreira	0	0	0	1	1
2	21	FW	(Portugal)	Carlos Mané	1	0	0	0	1
Totals					5	0	0	5	10
