= 2022–23 Rio Ave F.C. season =

Rio Ave F.C.
2022–23 season
- President: António Silva Campos
- Head coach: Luís Freire
- Stadium: Estádio dos Arcos
- Primeira Liga: 10th
- Taça de Portugal: Third round
- Taça da Liga: Group stage
- Top goalscorer: League: Abdul-Aziz Yakubu (6); All: Abdul-Aziz Yakubu (6)
Home colours	Away colours	Third colours
- All statistics correct as of 1 December 2022.

The 2022–23 season is the 84th in the history of Rio Ave F.C. and their second consecutive season in the top flight. The club will participate in the Primeira Liga, the Taça de Portugal, and the Taça da Liga.

== Players ==
As of 19 September 2022

Note: Flags indicate national team as defined under FIFA eligibility rules; some limited exceptions apply. Players may hold more than one non-FIFA nationality.

No.	Pos.	Nation	Player
1	GK	BRA	Magrão
2	DF	BRA	Júnio Rocha
3	DF	POR	Miguel Nóbrega
4	DF	BRA	Patrick William
6	MF	POR	Guga (vice-captain)
8	MF	POR	Vítor Gomes (captain)
9	FW	COL	Leonardo Acevedo
10	MF	FRA	Amine Oudrhiri
11	MF	POR	Bruno Ventura
13	DF	POR	João Ferreira
14	MF	POR	Joca
15	MF	ESP	Miguel Baeza (on loan from Celta)
17	FW	POR	Ukra
18	GK	BRA	Jhonatan
19	FW	GHA	Abdul-Aziz Yakubu

No.	Pos.	Nation	Player
20	DF	POR	Costinha
21	MF	POR	João Graça
22	FW	GHA	Emmanuel Boateng
23	DF	POR	Josué Sá
24	DF	POR	Pedro Amaral
27	FW	POR	Hernâni
30	MF	GRE	Andreas Samaris
33	DF	BRA	Aderllan Santos
40	GK	BRA	Lucas Flores
42	DF	CRO	Renato Pantalon
77	FW	POR	Fábio Ronaldo
87	DF	GHA	Philomon Baffour
93	MF	BRA	Paulo Vitor
95	FW	POR	André Pereira
99	FW	CRO	Marko Brkić

=== Out on loan ===
Note: Flags indicate national team as defined under FIFA eligibility rules; some limited exceptions apply. Players may hold more than one non-FIFA nationality.

No.	Pos.	Nation	Player
—	DF	BRA	Hugo Gomes (at Moreirense)
—	DF	POR	Nuno Namora (at Felgueiras)
—	DF	NZL	Nando Pijnaker (at Sligo Rovers)

No.	Pos.	Nation	Player
—	DF	BRA	Sávio (at Goiás)
—	FW	POR	Zé Manuel (at Nacional)

== Pre-season and friendlies ==
Win Draw Loss Fixtures

2 July 2022 Friendly	Rio Ave (Portugal)	11–0	(Portugal) Seleção Concelhia de Vila do Conde	Vila do Conde
--:-- WEST (UTC+1)	Pantalon; Pereira; Ukra; Guga; Olinga; Brkić; Figo; Ventura			Stadium: Estádio dos Arcos

9 July 2022 Friendly	Rio Ave (Portugal)	2–0	(Portugal) Tondela	Vila do Conde
10:30 WEST (UTC+1)	Costinha 20'; H. Gomes 77'

16 July 2022 Friendly	Rio Ave (Portugal)	0–0	(Portugal) Paços de Ferreira	Vila do Conde
10:30 WEST (UTC+1)

23 July 2022 Friendly	Rio Ave (Portugal)	0–2	(Portugal) Santa Clara	Vila do Conde
10:00 WEST (UTC+1)		Report	Mohebi; Oliveira	Stadium: Campo de Treinos do Rio Ave FC

27 July 2022 Friendly	Rio Ave (Portugal)	3–1	(Portugal) Oliveirense	Vila do Conde
10:00 WEST (UTC+1)	Pereira (pen.)		Pisco

30 July 2022 Friendly	Rio Ave (Portugal)	1–0	(Portugal) Académico de Viseu	Vila do Conde
18:00 WEST (UTC+1)	Clóvis 54' (o.g.)			Stadium: Estádio dos Arcos; Referee: Bruno Costa

== Competitions ==
=== Overall record ===
Competition	First match	Last match	Starting round	Record							
Competition	First match	Last match	Starting round	Pld	W	D	L	GF	GA	GD	Win %
Primeira Liga	6 August 2022	May 2023	Matchday 1	13	5	3	5	16	18	−2	38.46
Taça de Portugal	16 October 2022		Third round	1	0	0	1	2	3	−1	0.00
Taça da Liga	1 December 2022		Group stage	1	1	0	0	1	0	+1	100.00
Total				15	6	3	6	19	21	−2	40.00

Last updated: 1 December 2022
Source: Soccerway

=== Primeira Liga ===
==== League table ====
Pos	Team	Pld	W	D	L	GF	GA	GD	Pts
10	Casa Pia	34	11	8	15	31	40	−9	41
11	Vizela	34	11	7	16	34	38	−4	40 (Note: Vizela finished ahead of Rio Ave on head-to-head points: Rio Ave 0–1 Vizela, Vizela 3–1 Rio Ave.)
12	Rio Ave	34	10	10	14	36	43	−7	40
13	Gil Vicente	34	10	7	17	32	41	−9	37
14	Estoril	34	10	5	19	33	49	−16	35

Source: Liga Portugal
Rules for classification: 1) Points; 2) Head-to-head points; 3) Head-to-head goal difference; 4) Goal difference; 5) Matches won; 6) Goals scored; 7) Play-off.

==== Results summary ====
Overall								Home						Away					
Pld	W	D	L	GF	GA	GD	Pts	W	D	L	GF	GA	GD	W	D	L	GF	GA	GD
34	10	10	14	36	43	−7	40	8	3	6	18	14	+4	2	7	8	18	29	−11

Last updated: 26 May 2023.
Source: Liga Portugal

==== Results by round ====
Round	1	2	3	4	5	6	7	8	9	10	11	12	13	14	15	16	17	18	19	20	21	22	23	24	25	26	27	28	29	30	31	32	33	34
Ground	H	A	A	H	A	H	A	H	A	H	A	H	A	H	A	H	A	A	H	H	A	H	A	H	A	H	A	H	A	H	A	H	A	H
Result	L	L	D	W	D	L	D	W	L	W	L	W	W	D	D	L	D	L	L	W	L	W	L	W	W	L	D	D	L	W	D	L	L	D
Position	12	15	15	14	12	14	13	10	13	12	13	12	10	7	8	11	11	12	13	11	12	9	11	8	8	9	10	11	12	11	12	12	12	12

Updated to match(es) played on 26 May 2023. Source: Liga Portugal
A = Away; H = Home; W = Win; D = Draw; L = Loss

==== Matches ====
The league fixtures were announced on 5 July 2022.

6 August 2022 1	Rio Ave	0–1	Vizela	Vila do Conde
15:30 WEST (UTC+1)		Report	Moreira 66'	Stadium: Estádio dos Arcos; Referee: Gustavo Correia

13 August 2022 2	Sporting CP	v	Rio Ave	Lisbon
20:30 WEST (UTC+1)				Stadium: Estádio José Alvalade
