= 2023–24 Rio Ave F.C. season =

Rio Ave F.C.
2023–24 season
- Manager: Luís Freire
- Stadium: Estádio dos Arcos
- Primeira Liga: 11th
- Taça de Portugal: Third round
- Taça da Liga: Second round
- Top goalscorer: League: Emmanuel Boateng (7); All: Emmanuel Boateng (7)
Home colours	Away colours	Third colours
- All statistics correct as of 26 May 2024.

The 2023–24 season was Rio Ave F.C.'s 85th season in existence and third consecutive in the Primeira Liga, the top division of association football in Portugal. They also competed in the Taça de Portugal and the Taça da Liga.

== Players ==
=== Current squad ===
As of 1 February 2024

Note: Flags indicate national team as defined under FIFA eligibility rules; some limited exceptions apply. Players may hold more than one non-FIFA nationality.

No.	Pos.	Nation	Player
1	GK	BRA	Lucas Flores
2	DF	GEO	Jorge Karseladze
3	DF	POR	Miguel Nóbrega
4	DF	BRA	Patrick William
5	MF	ARG	Mateo Tanlongo (on loan from Sporting CP)
7	MF	POR	João Teixeira (on loan from Al-Markhiya)
8	MF	POR	Vítor Gomes (captain)
9	FW	COL	Leonardo Ruiz
10	MF	FRA	Amine Oudrhiri
11	FW	POR	Umaro Embaló (on loan from Fortuna Sittard)
12	GK	POL	Cezary Miszta (on loan from Legia Warsaw)
14	MF	POR	Joca
15	MF	POR	Adrien Silva
16	DF	BRA	Sávio
17	FW	POR	Ukra
18	GK	BRA	Jhonatan

No.	Pos.	Nation	Player
19	DF	POR	Ruca
20	DF	POR	Costinha
21	MF	POR	João Graça
22	FW	GHA	Emmanuel Boateng
23	DF	POR	Josué Sá
24	DF	COL	Cristian Devenish (on loan from Atlético Nacional)
27	MF	GRE	Marios Vrousai (on loan from Olympiacos)
28	DF	POR	Hélder Sá
33	DF	BRA	Aderllan Santos
39	MF	NED	Amine Rehmi (on loan from TOP Oss)
42	DF	CRO	Renato Pantalon
70	FW	POR	Zé Manuel
77	FW	POR	Fábio Ronaldo
81	FW	GHA	Abdul-Aziz Yakubu
82	GK	BRA	Magrão
95	FW	POR	André Pereira

=== Out on loan ===
Note: Flags indicate national team as defined under FIFA eligibility rules; some limited exceptions apply. Players may hold more than one non-FIFA nationality.

No.	Pos.	Nation	Player
13	MF	FRA	Julien Lomboto (at Oliveirense until 30 June 2024)
90	FW	ANG	Anderson Cruz (at Petro de Luanda until 30 June 2024)
—	MF	POR	Bruno Ventura (at Leixões until 30 June 2024)

== Pre-season and friendlies ==
15 July 2023 Friendly	Rio Ave	1–1	Vitória de Guimarães
18:00

17 November 2023 Friendly	Moreirense	2–0	Rio Ave
10:30

== Competitions ==
=== Overall record ===
Competition	First match	Last match	Starting round	Final position	Record							
Competition	First match	Last match	Starting round	Final position	Pld	W	D	L	GF	GA	GD	Win %
Primeira Liga	12 August 2023	May 2024	Matchday 1		22	4	9	9	22	31	−9	18.18
Taça de Portugal	22 October 2023		Third round	Third round	1	0	0	1	1	2	−1	0.00
Taça da Liga	22 July 2023	30 July 2023	First round	Second round	2	1	0	1	3	2	+1	50.00
Total					25	5	9	11	26	35	−9	20.00

Last updated: 16 February 2024
Source: Soccerway

=== Primeira Liga ===
==== League table ====
Pos	Team	Pld	W	D	L	GF	GA	GD	Pts
9	Casa Pia	34	10	8	16	38	50	−12	38
10	Farense	34	10	7	17	46	51	−5	37 (Note: Head-to-head points: Farense 4, Rio Ave 1.)
11	Rio Ave	34	6	19	9	38	43	−5	37
12	Gil Vicente	34	9	9	16	42	52	−10	36
13	Estoril	34	9	6	19	49	58	−9	33 (Note: Head-to-head away goals scored: Estoril 1, Estrela da Amadora 0.)

Source: Liga Portugal
Rules for classification: 1) Points; 2) Head-to-head points; 3) Head-to-head goal difference; 4) Head-to-head away goals scored; 5) Goal difference; 6) Matches won; 7) Goals scored; 8) Play-off.

==== Results summary ====
Overall								Home						Away					
Pld	W	D	L	GF	GA	GD	Pts	W	D	L	GF	GA	GD	W	D	L	GF	GA	GD
34	6	19	9	38	43	−5	37	6	8	3	25	20	+5	0	11	6	13	23	−10

Last updated: 17 May 2024.
Source: Liga Portugal

==== Results by round ====
Round	1	2	3	4	5	6	7	8	9	10	11	12	13	14	15	16	17	18	19	20	21	22	23	24	25	26	27	28	29	30	31	32	33	34
Ground	H	A	H	A	H	A	H	A	H	H	A	H	A	H	A	H	A	A	H	A	H	A	H	A	H	A	A	H	A	H	A	H	A	H
Result	W	L	L	D	D	L	L	L	L	W	D	D	D	D	L	W	L	D	D	D	W	L	D	D	D	D	D	W	D	D	D	W	D	D
Position	3	12	13	11	12	14	16	17	17	15	16	16	15	16	16	15	16	16	16	15	13	15	14	13	14	15	14	12	11	11	11	11	11	11

Updated to match(es) played on 17 May 2024. Source: Liga Portugal
A = Away; H = Home; W = Win; D = Draw; L = Loss

==== Matches ====
The league fixtures were unveiled on 5 July 2023.

13 August 2023 1	Rio Ave	2–0	Chaves	Vila do Conde
				Stadium: Estádio dos Arcos

28 August 2023 3	Rio Ave	1–2	Porto	Vila do Conde
				Stadium: Estádio dos Arcos

16 September 2023 5	Rio Ave	1–1	Famalicão	Vila do Conde
				Stadium: Estádio dos Arcos

1 October 2023 7	Rio Ave	0–4	Moreirense	Vila do Conde
				Stadium: Estádio dos Arcos

29 October 2023 9	Rio Ave	3–4	Farense	Vila do Conde
				Stadium: Estádio dos Arcos

5 November 2023 10	Rio Ave	2–0	Boavista	Vila do Conde
				Stadium: Estádio dos Arcos

2 December 2023 12	Rio Ave	1–1	Estrela da Amadora	Vila do Conde
				Stadium: Estádio dos Arcos

16 December 2023 14	Rio Ave	1–1	Vizela	Vila do Conde
				Stadium: Estádio dos Arcos

7 January 2024 16	Rio Ave	2–0	Portimonense	Vila do Conde
				Stadium: Estádio dos Arcos

31 January 2024 19	Rio Ave	1–1	Estoril	Vila do Conde
18:45				Stadium: Estádio dos Arcos

3 February 2024 20	Porto	0–0	Rio Ave	Porto
20:30			Boateng (red card) 90+2'	Stadium: Estádio do Dragão

11 February 2024 21	Rio Ave	1–0	Casa Pia	Vila do Conde
15:30	Yakubu 88'			Stadium: Estádio dos Arcos; Referee: Carlos Macedo

16 February 2024 22	Famalicão	2–1	Rio Ave	Vila Nova de Famalicão
20:15	Cádiz 17', 66'		Yakubu 14' (pen.); Silva (penalty missed) 90+2'	Stadium: Estádio Municipal 22 de Junho; Referee: Artur Soares Dias

25 February 2024 23	Rio Ave	3–3	Sporting CP	Vila do Conde
				Stadium: Estádio dos Arcos

9 March 2024 25	Rio Ave	0–0	Braga	Vila do Conde
				Stadium: Estádio dos Arcos

6 April 2024 28	Rio Ave	3–0	Gil Vicente	Vila do Conde
				Stadium: Estádio dos Arcos

19 April 2024 30	Rio Ave	1–1	Arouca	Vila do Conde
				Stadium: Estádio dos Arcos

=== Taça de Portugal ===
22 October 2023 Third round	Torreense	2–1	Rio Ave	Torres Vedras
14:00 WEST (UTC+1)				Stadium: Estádio Manuel Marques

=== Taça da Liga ===
22 July 2023 First round	Rio Ave	3–0	Académico de Viseu	Vila do Conde
11:00 WEST (UTC+01:00)	Costinha 45+3', 84'; Pantalon 52'	Report		Stadium: Estádio dos Arcos; Attendance: 1,746; Referee: Hélder Carvalho

30 July 2023 Second round	Arouca	2–0	Rio Ave	Arouca
21:30 UTC+1	Kouassi 24'; Fernandes (yellow card) 31'; Mújica 67'; Jason (yellow card) 72'; Galović (yellow card) 75'; Quaresma (yellow card) 84'	Report	Costinha (yellow card) 22'	Stadium: Estádio Municipal; Referee: Flávio Duarte
