= Guga (footballer, born 1997) =

Portuguese footballer

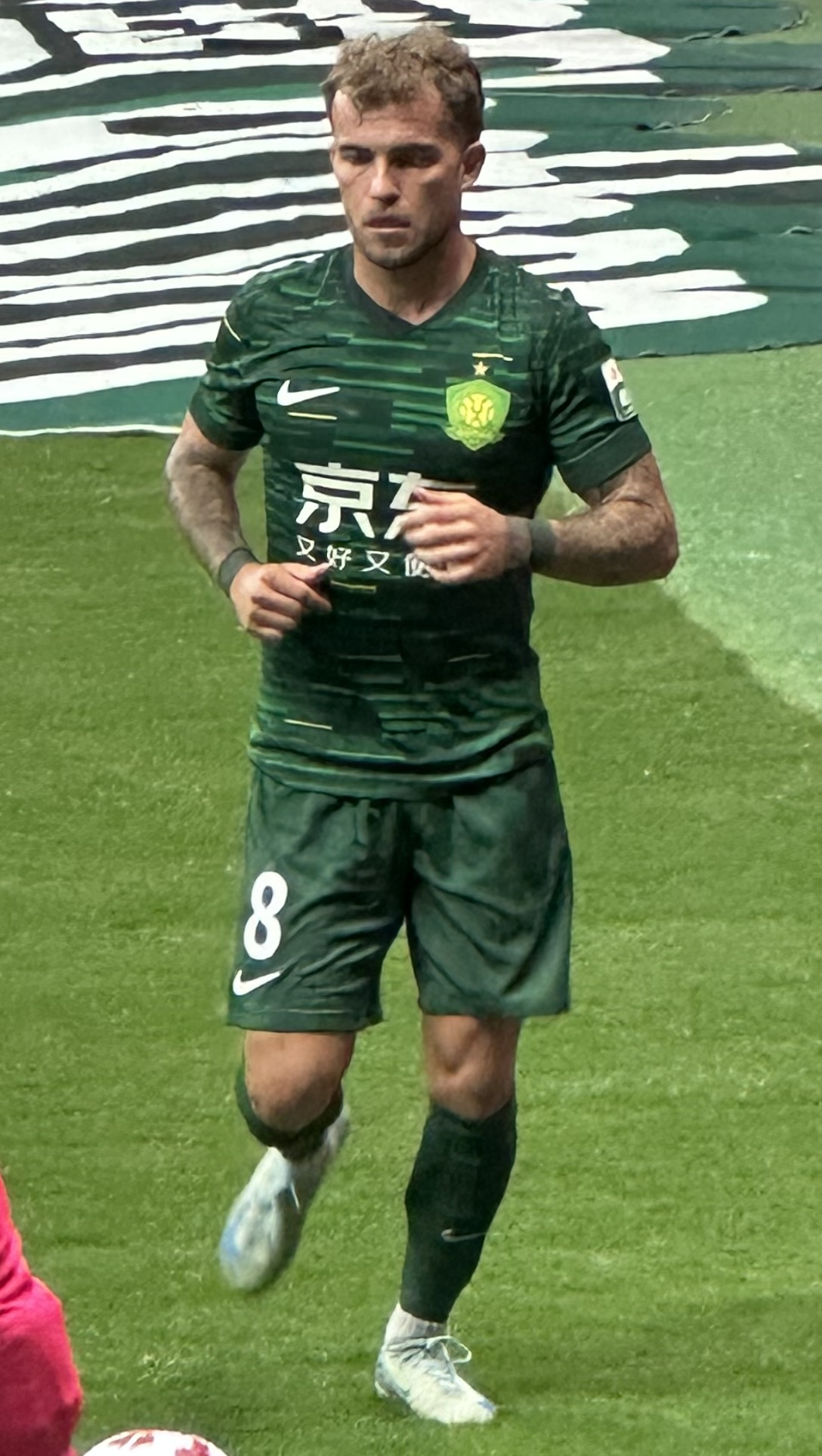
- Guga with Beijing Guoan in 2025

Personal information
- Full name: Gonçalo Rosa Gonçalves Pereira Rodrigues
- Date of birth: 18 July 1997 (age 29)
- Place of birth: Faro, Portugal
- Height: 1.67 m (5 ft 6 in)
- Position: Midfielder

Team information
- Current team: Pafos
- Number: 6

Youth career
- 2005–2007: Lusitano
- 2007–2008: Ferreiras
- 2008–2016: Benfica

Senior career*
Years	Team	Apps	(Gls)
2016–2019	Benfica B	9	(0)
2019	→ Panetolikos (loan)	14	(0)
2019–2021	Famalicão	32	(3)
2021–2024	Rio Ave	101	(5)
2024–2025	Beijing Guoan	59	(9)
2026	Al-Najma	14	(0)
2026–	Pafos	5	(0)

International career
2012	Portugal U15	2	(0)
2013	Portugal U16	10	(1)
2012–2014	Portugal U17	20	(2)
2015	Portugal U18	5	(2)
2015–2016	Portugal U19	15	(4)
- * Club domestic league appearances and goals as of 19:05, 11 October 2026 (UTC)

Gonçalo Rosa Gonçalves Pereira Rodrigues (born 18 July 1997), known as Guga, is a Portuguese professional footballer who plays as a midfielder for Cypriot First Division club Pafos.

== Club career ==
=== Benfica ===
Born in Faro, Algarve, Guga started his career at local club Lusitano in 2005, before joining Benfica's youth system at the age of 11. He made his professional debut with the latter's reserves on 13 August 2016, as a late substitute in a 2–0 away loss against Varzim in the LigaPro.

On 9 January 2019, Guga joined Panetolikos of the Super League Greece on a six-month loan deal with the option for an additional year.

=== Famalicão ===
On 26 June 2019, Guga signed a five-year contract with Famalicão. His Primeira Liga bow took place on 10 August, when he started and finished the 2–0 away win over Santa Clara. He scored his first goal on 14 September, the second of a 4–2 home victory against Paços de Ferreira.

=== Rio Ave ===
Guga joined Rio Ave on 14 January 2021, on a deal until June 2024. He played 20 matches until the end of the season, in an eventual relegation from the top division.

The following campaign, Guga made 40 appearances and scored three goals in all competitions as the Vila do Conde side returned to the top flight as champions; his strike in the 3–0 defeat of local rivals Varzim on 22 August 2021 was chosen as the club's Goal of the Season. On 5 July 2022, he was named Player of the Season for his efforts.

Guga displayed a series of impressive performances during 2022–23, helping Rio Ave finish comfortably in 12th place. At the end of the campaign, with just one year left on his contract, he was linked to Portuguese giants Porto.

=== Beijing Guoan ===
On 1 February 2024, having totalled 115 games during his spell at the Estádio dos Arcos, Guga transferred to Beijing Guoan from the Chinese Super League. He spent two seasons at the Workers' Stadium, making 65 appearances, scoring ten goals and providing nine assists while also claiming the FA Cup in 2025.

=== Al-Najma ===
On 29 January 2026, Guga agreed to a contract at Al-Najma, bottom of the Saudi Pro League; there, he was managed by his compatriot Mário Silva. He suffered relegation in his only season.

=== Pafos ===
Guga signed a three-year deal with Cypriot First Division club Pafos on 29 June 2026.

== International career ==
Guga won 52 caps for Portugal across several youth levels.

== Career statistics ==
As of match played 15 October 2026

Appearances and goals by club, season and competition
Club	Season	League			National cup (Note: Includes Taça de Portugal, Chinese FA Cup)		League cup (Note: Includes Taça da Liga)		Continental		Other		Total	
Club	Season	Division	Apps	Goals	Apps	Goals	Apps	Goals	Apps	Goals	Apps	Goals	Apps	Goals
Benfica B	2016–17	LigaPro	8	0	—		—		—		—		8	0
Benfica B	2017–18	LigaPro	0	0	—		—		—		—		0	0
Benfica B	2018–19	LigaPro	1	0	—		—		—		—		1	0
Benfica B	Total		9	0	—		—		—		—		9	0
Panetolikos (loan)	2018–19	Super League Greece	14	0	0	0	—		—		—		14	0
Famalicão	2019–20	Primeira Liga	26	2	2	0	1	0	—		—		29	2
Famalicão	2020–21	Primeira Liga	6	1	1	0	0	0	—		—		7	1
Famalicão	Total		32	3	3	0	1	0	—		—		36	3
Rio Ave	2020–21	Primeira Liga	20	0	0	0	0	0	—		1 (Note: Appearance in Primeira Liga relegation play-offs)	0	21	0
Rio Ave	2021–22	Liga Portugal 2	33	2	4	1	3	0	—		—		40	3
Rio Ave	2022–23	Primeira Liga	33	2	1	0	2	0	—		—		36	2
Rio Ave	2023–24	Primeira Liga	15	1	1	0	2	0	—		—		18	1
Rio Ave	Total		101	5	6	1	7	0	—		1	0	115	6
Beijing Guoan	2024	Chinese Super League	29	5	1	0	—		—		—		30	5
Beijing Guoan	2025	Chinese Super League	30	4	4	1	—		3 (Note: Appearance in AFC Champions League Two)	0	—		37	5
Beijing Guoan	Total		59	9	5	1	—		3	0	—		67	10
Pafos	2026–27	Cypriot First Division	5	0	0	0	—		7 (Note: Four appearances and one goal in UEFA Europa League, three appearances in UEFA Conference League)	1	1 (Note: Appearance in Cypriot Super Cup)	0	13	1
Career total			209	15	14	2	8	0	10	1	2	0	243	18

== Honours ==
Rio Ave

- Liga Portugal 2: 2021–22

Beijing Guoan

- Chinese FA Cup: 2025

Pafos

- Cypriot Super Cup: 2026

Individual

- Liga Portugal 2 Player of the Season: 2021–22
- Liga Portugal 2 Team of the Season: 2021–22
- Liga Portugal 2 Player of the Month: August 2021
- Liga Portugal 2 Midfielder of the Month: August 2021, April 2022
- Rio Ave Player of the Season: 2021–22
- Rio Ave Goal of the Season: 2021–22
