= Francisco Geraldes =

Portuguese footballer

Personal information
- Full name: Francisco Oliveira Geraldes
- Date of birth: 18 April 1995 (age 31)
- Place of birth: Lisbon, Portugal
- Height: 1.75 m (5 ft 9 in)
- Position: Attacking midfielder

Team information
- Current team: Chungbuk Cheongju
- Number: 80

Youth career
- 2003–2014: Sporting CP

Senior career*
Years	Team	Apps	(Gls)
2013–2017	Sporting CP B	71	(11)
2015–2020	Sporting CP	15	(0)
2016–2017	→ Moreirense (loan)	15	(1)
2017–2018	→ Rio Ave (loan)	30	(3)
2018	→ Eintracht Frankfurt (loan)	0	(0)
2019–2020	→ AEK Athens (loan)	3	(0)
2020–2021	Rio Ave	32	(0)
2021–2023	Estoril	58	(5)
2023–2024	Baniyas	12	(0)
2024–2025	Johor Darul Ta'zim	5	(0)
2024–2025	→ Eldense (loan)	3	(0)
2025	→ Wellington Phoenix (loan)	5	(1)
2025	Athletic-MG	10	(0)
2026	Seoul E-Land	6	(0)
2026–	Chungbuk Cheongju	3	(1)

International career
2012–2013	Portugal U18	3	(0)
2015	Portugal U20	2	(0)
2016	Portugal U21	2	(0)
- * Club domestic league appearances and goals as of 14:35, 25 September 2026 (UTC)

Francisco 'Chico' Oliveira Geraldes (born 18 April 1995) is a Portuguese professional footballer who plays as an attacking midfielder for K League 2 club Chungbuk Cheongju.

== Club career ==
Born in Lisbon, Geraldes joined local Sporting CP's youth system in 2003, aged 8. On 30 March 2013, whilst still a junior, he made his professional debut with their reserves, playing one minute in a 3–1 home loss against Benfica B in the Segunda Liga.

Geraldes spent the first part of the 2016–17 season on loan to Primeira Liga team Moreirense, his maiden appearance in the competition taking place on 13 August 2016 in a 1–1 home draw with Paços de Ferreira. His first goal came the following weekend, when he helped the visitors defeat Feirense 3–0 also as a starter.

In late January 2017, both Geraldes and Daniel Podence were recalled from their loans by Sporting manager Jorge Jesus. He made his competitive debut for his parent club on 11 March, coming on as a late substitute in the 4–1 away win over Tondela.

For 2017–18, still owned by Sporting, Geraldes signed with Rio Ave. The following campaign, also on loan, he joined Germany's Eintracht Frankfurt.

Geraldes was loaned to AEK Athens on 24 June 2019, with no purchase option included in the deal. On 21 August 2020, he returned to Rio Ave on a permanent three-year contract. On 1 October, he equalised an eventual 2–2 home draw against AC Milan, and also converted his attempt in the penalty shoot-out loss in the play-off round of the UEFA Europa League.

On 30 July 2021, with 38 official appearances at the Estádio dos Arcos to his credit (one goal), Geraldes signed a two-year deal with newly promoted Estoril. In August 2023, after it expired, he joined Baniyas in the UAE Pro League on a contract of the same duration.

Geraldes left the latter by mutual agreement on 6 January 2024, moving to Johor Darul Ta'zim from the Malaysia Super League one week later. He scored four times in the year's FA Cup in six games as his side won the tournament.

On 30 August 2024, Geraldes joined Spanish Segunda División side Eldense on a one-year loan. The following 7 February, having made just four total appearances, the move was cancelled, and five days later he agreed to a contract at Wellington Phoenix of the A-League also on loan.

On 12 August 2025, Geraldes signed for Campeonato Brasileiro Série B's Athletic-MG, as the club was coached by his compatriot Rui Duarte. The 31-year-old moved to the K League 2 with Seoul E-Land in March 2026, finishing the year in the same country at Chungbuk Cheongju.

== International career ==
Geraldes won two caps for Portugal at under-21 level. His first was on 6 October 2016, in a 3–3 draw in Hungary in the 2017 UEFA European Championship qualifiers where he provided an assist to Podence. The following month, he featured in the 3–1 friendly win against the Czech Republic in Setúbal.

== Personal life ==
An avid reader, Geraldes listed George Orwell as his favourite author.

== Career statistics ==
As of 24 August 2024

Appearances and goals by club, season and competition
Club	Season	League			National cup		League cup		Continental		Other		Total	
Club	Season	Division	Apps	Goals	Apps	Goals	Apps	Goals	Apps	Goals	Apps	Goals	Apps	Goals
Sporting CP B	2012–13	Segunda Liga	2	0	—		—		—		—		2	0
Sporting CP B	2013–14	Segunda Liga	0	0	—		—		—		—		0	0
Sporting CP B	2014–15	Segunda Liga	25	4	—		—		—		—		25	4
Sporting CP B	2015–16	Segunda Liga	38	7	—		—		—		—		38	7
Sporting CP B	2016–17	Segunda Liga	6	0	—		—		—		—		6	0
Sporting CP B	Total		71	11	0	0	0	0	0	0	0	0	71	11
Moreirense (loan)	2016–17	Primeira Liga	15	1	0	0	4	1	—		—		19	2
Sporting CP	2016–17	Primeira Liga	4	0	0	0	0	0	0	0	—		4	0
Sporting CP	2018–19	Primeira Liga	3	0	0	0	0	0	0	0	—		3	0
Sporting CP	2019–20	Primeira Liga	8	0	0	0	0	0	0	0	—		8	0
Sporting CP	Total		15	0	0	0	0	0	0	0	0	0	15	0
Rio Ave (loan)	2017–18	Primeira Liga	30	3	3	0	4	0	—		—		37	3
Eintracht Frankfurt (loan)	2018–19	Bundesliga	0	0	0	0	—		—		—		0	0
AEK Athens (loan)	2019–20	Super League Greece	3	0	0	0	—		3 (Note: Appearances in UEFA Europa League)	0	–		6	0
Rio Ave	2020–21	Primeira Liga	32	0	3	0	0	0	3	1	0	0	38	1
Rio Ave	2021–22	Liga Portugal 2	0	0	0	0	1	0	—		—		1	0
Rio Ave	Total		32	0	3	0	1	0	3	1	0	0	39	1
Estoril	2021–22	Primeira Liga	32	1	3	1	1	0	—		—		36	2
Estoril	2022–23	Primeira Liga	26	4	2	0	0	0	—		—		28	4
Estoril	Total		58	5	5	1	1	0	0	0	0	0	64	6
Baniyas	2023–24	UAE Pro League	12	0	2	0	0	0	0	0	0	0	14	0
Johor Darul Ta'zim	2024–25	Malaysia Super League	5	0	6	4	0	0	0	0	0	0	11	4
Career total			241	20	17	5	10	1	6	1	0	0	274	27

== Honours ==
Moreirense

- Taça da Liga: 2016–17

Johor Darul Ta'zim

- Malaysia Super League: 2024–25
- Malaysia FA Cup: 2024
