= Toni Borevković =

Croatian footballer

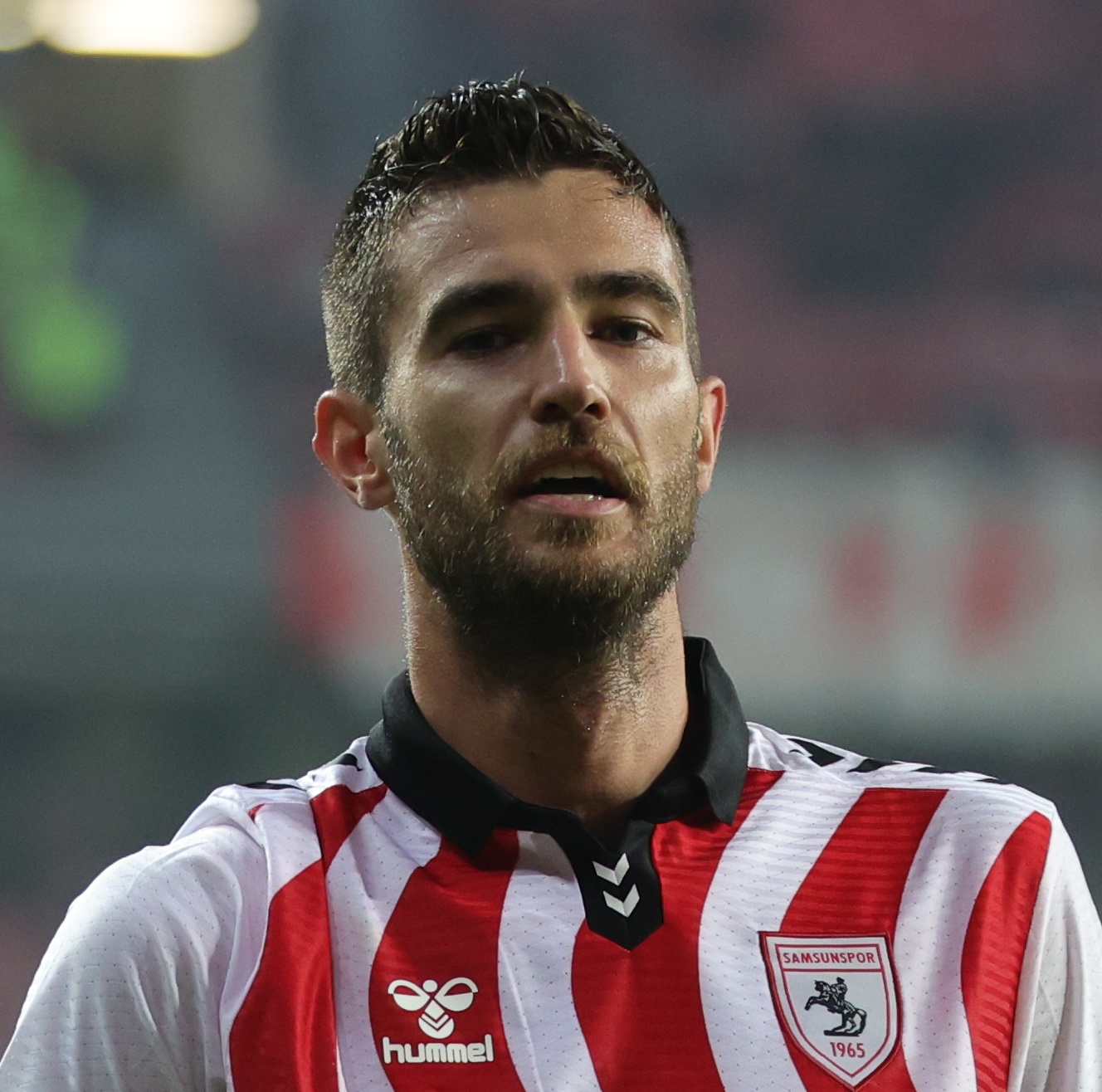

Personal information
- Date of birth: 18 June 1997 (age 29)
- Place of birth: Slavonski Brod, Croatia
- Height: 1.93 m (6 ft 4 in)
- Position: Centre-back

Team information
- Current team: Vitória SC (on loan from Samsunspor)

Youth career
- 2007-2009: Marsonia
- 2009: MV Croatia
- 2010–2011: Marsonia
- 2011–2012: Marsonia 1909
- 2012–2015: Dinamo Zagreb

Senior career*
Years	Team	Apps	(Gls)
2016	Dinamo Zagreb	0	(0)
2016	→ Rudeš (loan)	10	(0)
2016–2018	Rudeš	56	(1)
2018–2021	Rio Ave	84	(1)
2021–2025	Vitória SC	74	(0)
2022–2023	→ Hajduk Split (loan)	15	(0)
2025–	Samsunspor	18	(1)
2026–	→ Vitória SC (loan)	0	(0)

International career^{‡}
2015	Croatia U18	3	(0)
2015	Croatia U19	2	(0)
2018	Croatia U20	1	(0)
2017–2019	Croatia U21	3	(0)
- * Club domestic league appearances and goals as of 4 September 2026 ‡ National team caps and goals as of 11 July 2023

Toni Borevković (born 18 June 1997) is a Croatian professional footballer who plays as a midfielder for Primeira Liga club Vitória SC, on loan from Turkish Süper Lig side Samsunspor.

== Career ==
Born in Slavonski Brod, Croatia, Borevković is a product of local NK Marsonia and NK Marsonia 1909/MV Croatia youth ranks. In June 2018, he started his first experience abroad, joining Rio Ave on a five-year deal. He made his debut on 26 July 2018 in the UEFA Europa League play-offs against Jagiellonia Białystok.

On 8 July 2021, he signed a five-year contract with Vitória SC.

On 20 June he joined Hajduk on a one-year loan deal, with a €1 million option to buy clause.

== Career statistics ==
As of match played 8 December 2025

Appearances and goals by club, season and competition
Club	Season	League			National cup		League cup		Continental		Other		Total	
Club	Season	Division	Apps	Goals	Apps	Goals	Apps	Goals	Apps	Goals	Apps	Goals	Apps	Goals
Rudeš (loan)	2015–16	Druga HNL	10	0	—		—		—		—		10	0
Rudeš	2016–17	Druga HNL	25	0	2	0	—		—		—		27	0
Rudeš	2017–18	Prva HNL	31	1	0	0	—		—		—		31	1
Rudeš	Total		56	1	2	0	—		—		—		58	1
Rio Ave	2018–19	Primeira Liga	19	1	2	0	2	0	1	0	—		24	1
Rio Ave	2019–20	Primeira Liga	32	0	3	0	3	0	—		—		22	1
Rio Ave	2020–21	Primeira Liga	33	0	3	0	0	0	3	0	—		39	0
Rio Ave	Total		84	1	8	0	5	0	4	0	—		101	1
Vitória de Guimarães	2021–22	Primeira Liga	24	0	1	0	4	0	—		—		29	0
Vitória de Guimarães	2023–24	Primeira Liga	23	0	4	0	0	0	0	0	—		27	0
Vitória de Guimarães	2024–25	Primeira Liga	27	0	3	0	1	0	12	1	—		43	1
Vitória de Guimarães	2024–25	Primeira Liga	1	0	—		—		—		—		1	0
Vitória de Guimarães	Total		75	0	8	0	5	0	12	1	—		100	1
Hajduk Split (loan)	2022–23	Prva HNL	15	0	0	0	—		2	0	1	0	18	0
Samsunspor	2025–26	Süper Lig	7	1	0	0	—		3	0	—		10	1
Career total			247	3	18	0	10	0	21	1	1	0	297	4
