= Aderllan Santos =

Brazilian footballer (born 1989)

Personal information
- Full name: Aderllan Leandro de Jesus Santos
- Date of birth: 9 April 1989 (age 37)
- Place of birth: Salgueiro, Brazil
- Height: 1.93 m (6 ft 4 in)
- Position: Centre-back

Youth career
- 1997–2005: Tête
- 2005–2008: Salgueiro

Senior career*
Years	Team	Apps	(Gls)
2008–2010	Salgueiro	4	(0)
2009	→ Araripina (loan)		
2010–2012	Trofense	33	(7)
2012–2013	Braga B	18	(0)
2012–2015	Braga	67	(7)
2015–2019	Valencia	29	(0)
2017–2018	→ São Paulo (loan)	5	(0)
2018	→ Vitória (loan)	20	(1)
2019–2020	Al-Ahli	8	(1)
2019–2020	→ Rio Ave (loan)	30	(0)
2020–2025	Rio Ave	144	(9)
2025–2026	AVS	27	(1)
- * Club domestic league appearances and goals as of 18:58, 10 May 2026 (UTC)

Aderllan Leandro de Jesus Santos (born 9 April 1989) is a Brazilian professional footballer who plays as a central defender.

== Club career ==
=== Early career ===
Born in Salgueiro, Pernambuco, Santos joined Salgueiro Atlético Clube's youth setup in 2005 after starting out at Escolinha de Futebol do Tête. He made his debut for the former in 2008, appearing rarely in the Série C.

In summer 2010, after a loan stint at Araripina Futebol Clube, Santos moved abroad, joining C.D. Trofense. He made his debut on 29 August, starting and scoring his team's only in a 2–1 Segunda Liga away loss against Gil Vicente FC.

After being rarely used during his first season, Santos appeared regularly during his second, scoring a career-best six goals in 28 matches.

=== Braga ===
On 11 July 2012, Santos signed a two-year contract with S.C. Braga, initially being assigned to the reserves also in the second tier. After being an ever-present figure for the latter, he made his first-team – and Primeira Liga – debut on 9 March of the following year, playing the full 90 minutes of a 2–0 home win over C.S. Marítimo.

Santos scored his first goal in the Portuguese top flight on 3 May 2013, his team's second in the 3–2 victory at Moreirense FC. On 25 September he signed a new five-year deal with a €20 million clause, after the Minho side refused an offer from Stade Rennais FC.

Santos was an undisputed starter the following two campaigns, attracting interest from a number of teams, one of them being AS Monaco FC.

=== Valencia ===
On 27 August 2015, Santos agreed to a five-year deal with Valencia CF for a fee of €9.5m. His maiden appearance in La Liga occurred on 22 September, as he featured the entire 1–0 away loss against RCD Espanyol.

Santos had subsequent loan spells in his country's Série A, with São Paulo FC and Esporte Clube Vitória.

=== Later career ===
On 24 January 2019, Santos joined Al Ahli Saudi FC. On 13 August, he made a return to Portugal on a season-long loan to Rio Ave FC, signing a permanent contract with the latter club the following May.

On 23 January 2025, Santos moved to fellow top-tier AVS Futebol SAD on a deal until June 2026.

== Career statistics ==
As of match played 10 May 2026

Appearances and goals by club, season and competition
Club	Season	League			State league		National cup (Note: Includes Taça de Portugal, Copa del Rey)		League cup (Note: Includes Taça da Liga)		Continental		Other		Total	
Club	Season	Division	Apps	Goals	Apps	Goals	Apps	Goals	Apps	Goals	Apps	Goals	Apps	Goals	Apps	Goals
Salgueiro	2008	Série C	4	0	0	0	—		—		—		—		4	0
Salgueiro	2009	Série C	0	0	0	0	—		—		—		—		0	0
Salgueiro	Total		4	0	0	0	—		—		—		—		4	0
Araripina (loan)	2009	—			0	0	—		—		—		—		0	0
Trofense	2009–10	Liga de Honra	0	0	—		0	0	0	0	—		—		0	0
Trofense	2010–11	Liga de Honra	5	1	—		0	0	3	0	—		—		8	1
Trofense	2011–12	Liga de Honra	28	6	—		1	0	3	0	—		—		32	6
Trofense	Total		33	7	—		1	0	6	0	—		—		40	7
Braga B	2012–13	Segunda Liga	18	0	—		—		—		—		—		18	0
Braga	2012–13	Primeira Liga	9	1	—		0	0	1	0	0	0	—		10	1
Braga	2013–14	Primeira Liga	25	3	—		6	1	4	0	2 (Note: Appearances in UEFA Europa League)	0	—		37	4
Braga	2014–15	Primeira Liga	31	3	—		7	2	3	0	—		—		41	5
Braga	2015–16	Primeira Liga	2	0	—		0	0	0	0	0	0	—		2	0
Braga	Total		67	7	—		13	3	8	0	2	0	—		90	10
Valencia	2015–16	La Liga	17	0	—		6	0	—		5 (Note: Three appearances in UEFA Champions League, two appearances and one goal in UEFA Europa League)	1	—		28	1
Valencia	2016–17	La Liga	12	0	—		3	0	—		—		—		15	0
Valencia	Total		29	0	—		9	0	—		5	1	—		43	1
São Paulo (loan)	2017	Série A	3	0	0	0	0	0	—		0	0	—		3	0
São Paulo (loan)	2018	Série A	0	0	2 (Note: Appearances in Campeonato Paulista)	0	0	0	—		0	0	—		2	0
São Paulo (loan)	Total		3	0	2	0	0	0	—		0	0	—		5	0
Vitória (loan)	2018	Série A	20	1	0	0	0	0	—		—		—		20	1
Al-Ahli	2018–19	Saudi Pro League	8	1	—		0	0	—		6 (Note: Appearances in AFC Champions League Elite)	0	—		14	1
Rio Ave (loan)	2019–20	Primeira Liga	30	0	—		2	0	2	0	—		—		34	0
Rio Ave	2020–21	Primeira Liga	32	2	—		3	0	—		3	0	2 (Note: Appearances in 2020–21 Primeira Liga relegation play-offs)	0	40	2
Rio Ave	2021–22	Liga Portugal 2	30	3	—		4	0	2	2	—		—		36	5
Rio Ave	2022–23	Primeira Liga	32	1	—		0	0	3	1	—		—		35	2
Rio Ave	2023–24	Primeira Liga	32	3	—		1	0	2	0	—		—		35	3
Rio Ave	2024–25	Primeira Liga	18	0	—		3	1	—		—		—		21	1
Rio Ave	Total		144	9	—		11	1	7	3	3	0	2	0	167	13
AVS	2024–25	Primeira Liga	10	0	—		0	0	—		—		2 (Note: Appearances in 2024–25 Primeira Liga relegation play-offs)	0	12	0
AVS	2025–26	Primeira Liga	17	1	—		1	0	—		—		—		18	1
AVS	Total		27	1	—		1	0	—		—		2	0	30	1
Career total			383	26	2	0	37	4	23	3	16	1	4	0	465	34

== Honours ==
Braga

- Taça da Liga: 2012–13

Rio Ave

- Liga Portugal 2: 2021–22

Individual

- Liga Portugal 2 Team of the Season: 2021–22
- Liga Portugal 2 Defender of the Month: August 2021
