= Costinha (footballer, born 2000) =

Portuguese footballer

Personal information
- Full name: João Pedro Loureiro da Costa
- Date of birth: March 26, 2000 (age 26)
- Place of birth: Póvoa de Varzim, Portugal
- Height: 1.81 m (5 ft 11 in)
- Position: Right-back

Team information
- Current team: Brighton & Hove Albion
- Number: 20

Youth career
- 2009–2010: Cavalões
- 2010–2011: Aveleda
- 2011–2013: Porto
- 2013–2017: Braga
- 2015–2016: → Palmeiras FC (loan)
- 2017–2020: Rio Ave

Senior career*
Years	Team	Apps	(Gls)
2020–2021	Rio Ave B	6	(2)
2020–2024	Rio Ave	107	(7)
2024–2026	Olympiacos	49	(0)
2026–	Brighton & Hove Albion	10	(0)

International career^{‡}
2018	Portugal U18	8	(0)
2018–2019	Portugal U19	22	(0)
2019	Portugal U20	4	(0)
2022	Portugal U21	1	(0)
- * Club domestic league appearances and goals as of 22 November 2026 ‡ National team caps and goals as of 17:32, 30 November 2022 (UTC)

João Pedro Loureiro da Costa (born 26 March 2000), better known as Costinha, is a Portuguese professional footballer who plays as a right-back for Premier League club Brighton & Hove Albion.

== Club career ==
Costinha is a youth product of Cavalões, Aveleda, Porto, Braga, Palmeiras and Rio Ave. He signed his first professional contract with Rio Ave on 16 May 2018. Costinha made his professional debut with Rio Ave in a 2–0 Primeira Liga loss to Gil Vicente on 29 November 2020.

On 13 June 2024, Costinha was selected in the Primeira Liga Team of the Year for the 2023–24 season. He finished the season with 37 appearances for Rio Ave, scoring five goals and providing six assists.

On 9 July 2024, Costinha joined Greek club Olympiacos in a permanent transfer.

On 15 June 2026, it was announced that Costinha would join Premier League club Brighton & Hove Albion on a five-year contract in a deal worth £11,000,000.

== International career ==
Costinha is a youth international for Portugal, having played up to the Portugal U21s.

== Career statistics ==
As of match played 22 November 2026

Appearances and goals by club, season and competition
Club	Season	League			National cup (Note: Includes Taça de Portugal, Greek Cup)		League cup (Note: Includes Taça da Liga, EFL Cup)		Europe		Other		Total	
Club	Season	Division	Apps	Goals	Apps	Goals	Apps	Goals	Apps	Goals	Apps	Goals	Apps	Goals
Rio Ave B	2020–21	Campeonato de Portugal	6	2	–		–		–		–		6	2
Rio Ave	2020–21	Primeira Liga	9	0	1	0	–		–		–		10	0
Rio Ave	2021–22	Liga Portugal 2	31	2	3	1	4	0	–		–		38	3
Rio Ave	2022–23	Primeira Liga	33	3	1	0	2	0	–		–		36	3
Rio Ave	2023–24	Primeira Liga	34	3	1	0	2	2	–		–		37	4
Rio Ave	Total		107	7	6	1	8	2	–		–		121	10
Olympiacos	2024–25	Super League Greece	25	0	5	0	–		9 (Note: Appearances in UEFA Europa League)	0	–		39	0
Olympiacos	2025–26	Super League Greece	24	0	3	0	–		7 (Note: Appearances in UEFA Champions League)	1	1 (Note: Appearance in Greek Super Cup)	0	35	1
Olympiacos	Total		49	0	8	0	–		16	1	1	0	74	1
Brighton & Hove Albion	2026–27	Premier League	10	0	0	0	2	0	4 (Note: Appearances in UEFA Conference League)	0	–		16	0
Career total			172	9	14	1	10	2	20	1	1	0	217	22

== Honours ==
Rio Ave

- Liga Portugal 2: 2021–22

Olympiacos

- Super League Greece: 2024–25
- Greek Football Cup: 2024–25
- Greek Super Cup: 2025

Individual

- Primeira Liga Team of the Year: 2023–24
