= Abdul-Aziz Yakubu =

Ghanaian footballer (born 1998)

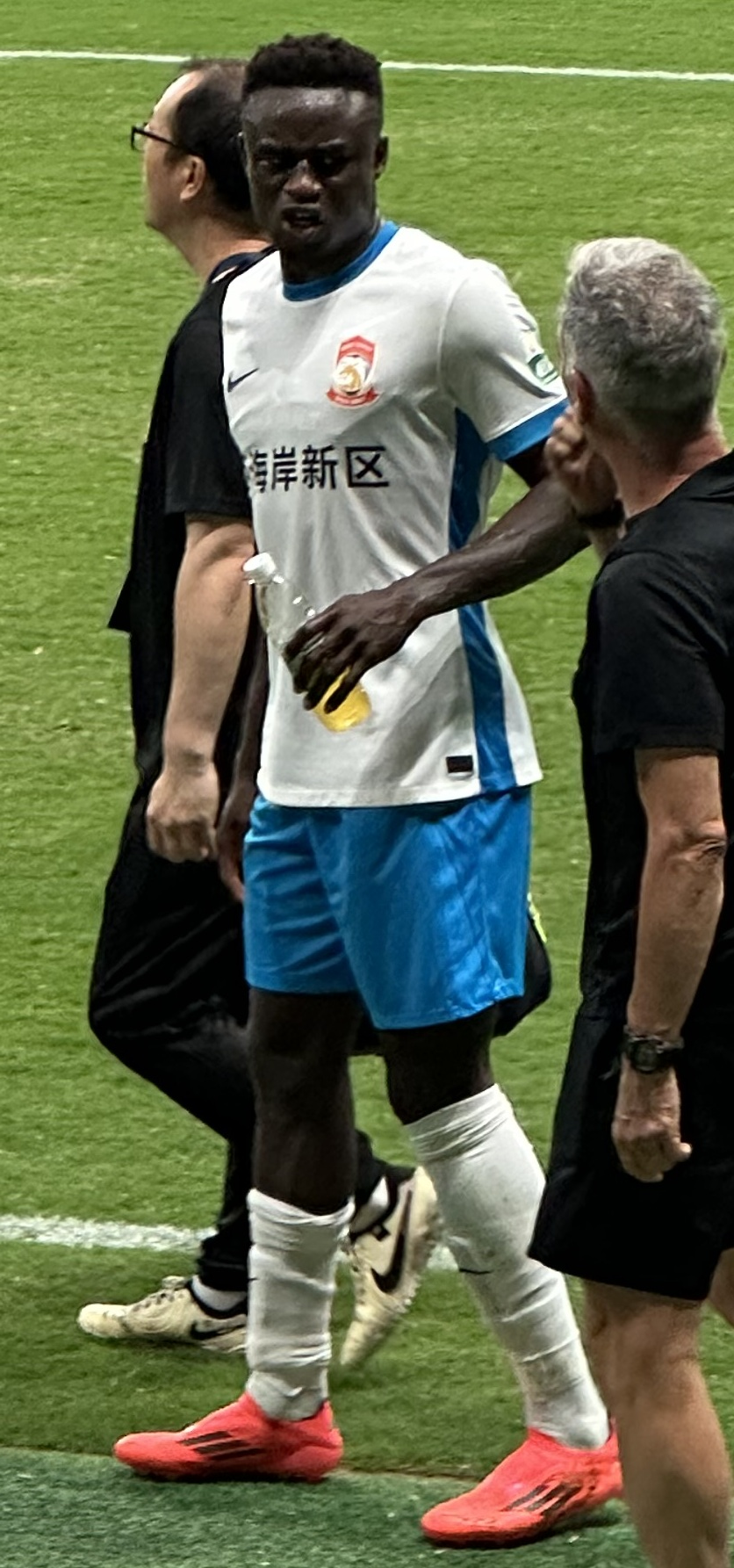
- Yakubu in 2025

Personal information
- Date of birth: 10 November 1998 (age 28)
- Place of birth: Tamale, Ghana
- Height: 1.87 m (6 ft 2 in)
- Position: Forward

Team information
- Current team: Qingdao West Coast
- Number: 9

Youth career
- –2014: Red Bull Ghana
- 2015–2016: Charity Stars
- 2016–2017: Vizela

Senior career*
Years	Team	Apps	(Gls)
2017–2019	Vizela	16	(2)
2018–2019	→ Vitória Guimarães B (loan)	28	(11)
2018–2019	→ Vitória Guimarães (loan)	1	(0)
2019–2020	Vitória Guimarães B	0	(0)
2020–2021	→ Estoril (loan)	28	(12)
2021–2022	→ Rio Ave (loan)	33	(11)
2022–2024	Rio Ave	33	(13)
2023	→ Wuhan Three Towns (loan)	23	(15)
2024–2025	Shimizu S-Pulse	6	(3)
2025	→ Qingdao West Coast (loan)	30	(10)
2026–	Qingdao West Coast	30	(6)
- * Club domestic league appearances and goals as of 8 November 2026

Abdul-Aziz Yakubu (born 10 November 1998) is a Ghanaian professional footballer who plays as a forward for Chinese Super League club Qingdao West Coast.

== Career ==
Yakubu began his senior career Vizela. He scored his first goal for Vizela in Taça de Portugal against Vilaverdense. In August 2018 he was loaned out to Vitória Guimarães B. Yakubu transferred to the Vitória Guimarães first team in 2019. He joined Estoril on loan in 2020. Abdul-Aziz Yakubu scored 12 goals in the 2020–21 season he greatly contributed to Estoril's winning Liga Portugal 2. On 31 July 2021, he joined Rio Ave in Liga Portugal 2 for the 2021–22 season. Aziz Yakubu made his debut against Rio Ave on 8 August 2021 against Académica in Liga Portugal 2 on 8 August 2021 and was included in the game from the reserve at the 72nd minute. Yakubu scored his first goal with Rio Ave in the Taça da Liga match against C.D. Santa Clara in the 16th minute. Yakubu enjoyed the trophy once again with Rio Ave in the 2021–22 season, becoming the champion in Liga Portugal 2 and promoted to Primeira Liga. Permanently transferred to Rio Ave in Vitória Guimarães in the summer of 2022. Yakubu scored his first goal in Primeira Liga with Rio Ave of the 2022–23 season on 19 August 2022, at recorded in the 73rd minute of the game that finished 2–2 against Estoril.

In March 2023, Yakubu joined Chinese Super League club Wuhan Three Towns on loan.

On 8 April, he made his debut in the Chinese FA Super Cup scoring the opener in the 10th minute and eventually beating Shandong Taishan 2–0 to secure the cup. His performance also earned him the man of the match award. At the end of the 2023 season, his loan ended and, on 3 January 2024, he returned to Rio Ave.

On 2 February 2026, Yakubu transferred to Chinese Super League club Wuhan Three Towns.

== Career statistics ==
As of match played 8 November 2026

Appearances and goals by club, season and competition
Club	Season	League			National cup		League cup		Continental		Other		Total	
Club	Season	Division	Apps	Goals	Apps	Goals	Apps	Goals	Apps	Goals	Apps	Goals	Apps	Goals
Vizela	2016–17	LigaPro	1	0	0	0	0	0	—		—		1	0
Vizela	2017–18	Campeonato de Portugal	15	2	1	1	—		—		—		16	3
Vizela	Total		16	2	1	1	0	0	—		—		17	3
Vitória Guimarães B (loan)	2018–19	LigaPro	28	11	—		—		—		—		28	11
Vitória Guimarães (loan)	2018–19	Primeira Liga	1	0	0	0	0	0	—		—		1	0
Vitória Guimarães B	2019–20	LigaPro	0	0	—		—		—		—		0	0
Estoril (loan)	2020–21	Liga Portugal 2	28	12	5	3	1	0	—		—		34	15
Rio Ave (loan)	2021–22	Liga Portugal 2	33	11	5	3	1	1	—		—		39	15
Rio Ave	2022–23	Primeira Liga	17	7	0	0	1	2	—		—		18	9
Rio Ave	2023–24	Primeira Liga	16	6	—		—		—		—		16	6
Rio Ave	Total		33	13	0	0	1	2	—		—		34	15
Wuhan Three Towns (loan)	2023	Chinese Super League	23	15	2	2	—		6 (Note: Appearances in AFC Champions League)	1	1 (Note: Appearance in Chinese FA Super Cup)	1	32	19
Shimizu S-Pulse	2024	J2 League	6	3	0	0	—		—		—		6	3
Qingdao West Coast (loan)	2025	Chinese Super League	30	10	3	2	—		—		—		33	12
Qingdao West Coast	2026	Chinese Super League	30	6	0	0	—		—		—		30	6
Qingdao West Coast	Qingdao total		60	16	3	2	—		—		—		63	18
Career total			228	83	16	11	3	3	6	1	1	1	254	89

== Honours ==
Estoril

- Liga Portugal 2: 2020–21

Rio Ave

- Liga Portugal 2: 2021–22

Wuhan Three Towns

- Chinese FA Super Cup: 2023
