= André Pereira (footballer) =

Portuguese footballer

Personal information
- Full name: André Filipe Ferreira Coelho Pereira
- Date of birth: 5 May 1995 (age 31)
- Place of birth: Milheirós, Portugal
- Height: 1.88 m (6 ft 2 in)
- Position: Forward

Youth career
- 2003–2006: Inter Milheirós
- 2006–2009: Porto
- 2009–2013: Leixões
- 2014: Varzim

Senior career*
| Years | Team | Apps | (Gls) |
| 2014 | Varzim B | 2 | (3) |
| 2014–2015 | Espinho | 29 | (5) |
| 2015–2017 | Sanjoanense | 37 | (11) |
| 2017–2019 | Porto B | 32 | (12) |
| 2017–2020 | Porto | 10 | (1) |
| 2018 | → Vitória Setúbal (loan) | 13 | (4) |
| 2019–2020 | → Vitória Guimarães (loan) | 9 | (2) |
| 2020 | → Zaragoza (loan) | 5 | (0) |
| 2020–2024 | Rio Ave | 43 | (2) |
| Total | | 180 | (40) |
- * Club domestic league appearances and goals

André Filipe Ferreira Coelho Pereira (born 5 May 1995) is a Portuguese former professional footballer who played as a forward.

== Club career ==
=== Early years and Porto ===
Pereira was born in the village of Milheirós in Maia, Porto District. He spent his first years as a senior in the lower leagues, starting out at Varzim SC's reserves.

On 31 January 2017, having scored eight competitive goals for A.D. Sanjoanense – six in the third division – Pereira signed a two-and-a-half-year contract with FC Porto, being assigned to their reserves in the Segunda Liga. He made his debut in the latter competition on 19 February, coming on as a late substitute in a 0–0 home draw against C.D. Santa Clara. His maiden appearance in the Primeira Liga with the first team occurred nine months later, when he played the last minutes of the 1–1 away draw to C.D. Aves; his first official match had taken place the previous week, when he provided the assist for Yacine Brahimi in injury time of the 3–2 win over Portimonense S.C. in the fourth round of the Taça de Portugal.

On 31 January 2018, Pereira was loaned to fellow top-tier club Vitória F.C. until 30 June. He scored his first goal for them in only his second appearance, but in a 3–1 loss at S.C. Braga.

Pereira was also loaned for the 2019–20 season, starting at Vitória de Guimarães and finishing at Real Zaragoza (Spanish Segunda División).

=== Rio Ave ===
On 31 August 2020, Pereira joined Rio Ave F.C. as Mehdi Taremi moved in the opposite direction. The following 15 January, after only one minute on the pitch in a league fixture against Sporting CP, he suffered a serious knee injury after performing a defensive tackle, being sidelined for the rest of the campaign.

Pereira announced his retirement in October 2025. Aged 30, he cited the multiple serious injuries he suffered throughout his career as the main factor for his decision.

== Career statistics ==
Appearances and goals by club, season and competition
| Club | Season | League | | | National cup | | League cup | | Continental | | Other | | Total | |
| Club | Season | Division | Apps | Goals | Apps | Goals | Apps | Goals | Apps | Goals | Apps | Goals | Apps | Goals |
|---|---|---|---|---|---|---|---|---|---|---|---|---|---|---|
| Varzim B | 2013–14 | AF Porto – Elite Division | 2 | 3 | — | | — | | — | | — | | 2 | 3 |
| Espinho | 2014–15 | Campeonato Nacional de Seniores | 29 | 5 | 2 | 0 | — | | — | | — | | 31 | 5 |
| Sanjoanense | 2015–16 | Campeonato de Portugal | 24 | 5 | 1 | 0 | — | | — | | — | | 25 | 5 |
| Sanjoanense | 2016–17 | Campeonato de Portugal | 13 | 6 | 5 | 2 | — | | — | | — | | 18 | 8 |
| Sanjoanense | Total | | 37 | 11 | 6 | 2 | — | | — | | — | | 43 | 13 |
| Porto B | 2016–17 | LigaPro | 13 | 4 | — | | — | | — | | — | | 13 | 4 |
| Porto B | 2017–18 | LigaPro | 18 | 8 | — | | — | | — | | — | | 18 | 8 |
| Porto B | 2018–19 | LigaPro | 1 | 0 | — | | — | | — | | — | | 1 | 0 |
| Porto B | Total | | 32 | 12 | — | | — | | — | | — | | 32 | 12 |
| Porto | 2017–18 | Primeira Liga | 1 | 0 | 1 | 0 | 0 | 0 | 0 | 0 | — | | 2 | 0 |
| Porto | 2018–19 | Primeira Liga | 9 | 1 | 5 | 1 | 3 | 1 | 4 (Note: Appearances in UEFA Champions League) | 0 | 1 (Note: Appearance in Supertaça Cândido de Oliveira) | 0 | 22 | 3 |
| Porto | Total | | 10 | 1 | 6 | 1 | 3 | 1 | 4 | 0 | 1 | 0 | 24 | 3 |
| Vitória Setúbal (loan) | 2017–18 | Primeira Liga | 13 | 4 | 0 | 0 | 0 | 0 | — | | — | | 13 | 4 |
| Vitória Guimarães (loan) | 2019–20 | Primeira Liga | 9 | 2 | 1 | 0 | 3 | 0 | 6 (Note: Appearances in UEFA Europa League) | 1 | — | | 19 | 3 |
| Zaragoza (loan) | 2019–20 | Segunda División | 5 | 0 | 1 | 0 | — | | — | | 2 (Note: Appearances in Segunda División play-offs) | 0 | 8 | 0 |
| Rio Ave | 2020–21 | Primeira Liga | 10 | 0 | 2 | 0 | — | | 0 | 0 | 0 | 0 | 12 | 0 |
| Rio Ave | 2021–22 | Liga Portugal 2 | 1 | 0 | 0 | 0 | 1 | 0 | — | | — | | 2 | 0 |
| Rio Ave | 2022–23 | Primeira Liga | 21 | 1 | 0 | 0 | 3 | 0 | — | | — | | 24 | 1 |
| Rio Ave | 2023–24 | Primeira Liga | 11 | 1 | 1 | 0 | 2 | 0 | — | | — | | 14 | 1 |
| Rio Ave | Total | | 43 | 2 | 3 | 0 | 6 | 0 | 0 | 0 | 0 | 0 | 52 | 2 |
| Career total | | | 180 | 40 | 19 | 3 | 12 | 1 | 10 | 1 | 3 | 0 | 224 | 45 |

== Honours ==
Porto

- Primeira Liga: 2017–18
- Supertaça Cândido de Oliveira: 2018

Rio Ave

- Liga Portugal 2: 2021–22
