= Rúben Gonçalves =

Portuguese footballer

Personal information
- Full name: Rúben Filipe dos Santos Vieira de Sousa Gonçalves
- Date of birth: 23 December 1998 (age 27)
- Place of birth: Valongo, Portugal
- Height: 1.80 m (5 ft 11 in)
- Position: Midfielder

Team information
- Current team: Rebordosa
- Number: 20

Youth career
- 2004–2014: Valonguense
- 2014–2017: Rio Ave

Senior career*
Years	Team	Apps	(Gls)
2017–2018	São Martinho	7	(1)
2018–2022	Rio Ave	11	(0)
2020–2021	→ Vilafranquense (loan)	19	(0)
2022	→ Vitória de Setúbal (loan)	11	(0)
2022–2023	Varzim	23	(1)
2023–2024	Lusitânia	29	(3)
2024–2026	Fafe	21	(1)
2026–	Rebordosa	3	(0)
- * Club domestic league appearances and goals as of 6 September 2026

Rúben Filipe dos Santos Vieira de Sousa Gonçalves (born 23 December 1998) is a Portuguese footballer who plays for Campeonato de Portugal club Rebordosa as a midfielder.

== Football career ==
Gonçalves made his professional debut with Rio Ave in a 2-1 Primeira Liga win over Vitória F.C. on 23 June 2020.
