= Pedro Amaral =

Portuguese footballer

Personal information
- Full name: Pedro Miguel Gaspar Amaral
- Date of birth: 25 August 1997 (age 29)
- Place of birth: Sintra, Portugal
- Height: 1.78 m (5 ft 10 in)
- Position: Left-back

Team information
- Current team: Rio Ave
- Number: 24

Youth career
- 2006–2007: Lourel
- 2007–2016: Benfica
- 2014: → Casa Pia (loan)

Senior career*
Years	Team	Apps	(Gls)
2016–2019	Benfica B	59	(1)
2019	→ Panetolikos (loan)	16	(0)
2019–2023	Rio Ave	82	(1)
2023	Al-Khaleej	15	(1)
2023–2024	Lamia	18	(1)
2024–2026	Estoril	56	(0)
2026–	Rio Ave	1	(0)

International career
2012	Portugal U15	2	(0)
2013	Portugal U16	2	(0)
2013–2014	Portugal U17	3	(0)
2014–2015	Portugal U18	4	(0)
2016	Portugal U19	3	(0)
2016–2017	Portugal U20	4	(0)
2017–2018	Portugal U21	3	(0)
- * Club domestic league appearances and goals as of 22:29, 6 September 2026 (UTC)

Pedro Miguel Gaspar Amaral (born 25 August 1997) is a Portuguese professional footballer who plays as a left-back for Primeira Liga club Rio Ave.

== Club career ==
=== Benfica ===
Born in Sintra, Lisbon District, Amaral joined Benfica's youth system at the age of 10. He made his professional debut for the reserve team on 11 September 2016, as a 60th-minute substitute in a 2–1 home win against Académico de Viseu in the LigaPro where he featured as a right-back.

Amaral scored his only goal in the second division on 8 August 2017, but in a 2–1 away loss to Oliveirense. In January 2019, he signed for Super League Greece club Panetolikos on a six-month loan deal with an option for an additional year.

=== Rio Ave ===
On 4 July 2019, Amaral joined Rio Ave on a five-year contract. His Primeira Liga bow took place on 25 October, in a goalless draw at Paços de Ferreira.

Amaral contributed 28 appearances in the 2021–22 season, as his team returned from the Liga Portugal 2 as champions. He scored his first goal in the top flight on 28 August 2022, in the 3–1 home victory over title holders Porto.

=== Khaleej ===
On 19 January 2023, Amaral agreed to a five-month deal at Al-Khaleej. He scored his only goal in the Saudi Pro League on 22 May, opening an eventual 4–1 away defeat of Al Wehda.

=== Lamia ===
Amaral returned to the Greek top tier in September 2023, on a one-year contract at Lamia. He scored his sole goal on 4 February 2024, in the 4–1 away win over PAS Giannina in the domestic league.

=== Estoril ===
On 9 July 2024, Amaral joined Estoril on a two-year deal. During his spell, where he was an occasional captain, he played 57 games and provided four assists.

=== Later career ===
Amaral returned to Rio Ave in August 2026, on a contract until June 2028.

== International career ==
Amaral won his first cap for the Portugal under-21 side on 5 September 2017, in a 2–0 home win against Wales in the 2019 UEFA European Championship qualifiers where he was also booked.

== Honours ==
Rio Ave

- Liga Portugal 2: 2021–22
