= Estádio do Rio Ave FC =

Stadium in Vila do Conde, Portugal

- Interactive map of Estádio do Rio Ave FC
- Former names: Estádio dos Arcos
- Location: Vila do Conde, Portugal
- Coordinates: 41°21′46″N 8°44′25″W
- Owner: Rio Ave
- Capacity: 5,300
- Surface: Grass
- Field size: 105 x 68 metres
- Public transit: Vila do Conde

Construction
- Built: 1984
- Opened: 1985
- Architect: Branco Ló

Tenant
- Rio Ave

The Estádio do Rio Ave FC, also known as Estadio dos Arcos, is a multi-use stadium in Vila do Conde, Portugal. It is used mostly for football matches of Primeira Liga club Rio Ave. The stadium is able to hold 12,815 people and was built in 1985.

Since November 2020 it is only able to hold around 5,300 people as the eastern stand was demolished for structural problems.
