= 2021–22 Portimonense S.C. season =

Portimonense S.C.
2021–22 season
- Chairman: Fernando Rocha
- Manager: Paulo Sérgio
- Stadium: Estádio Municipal
- Primeira Liga: 11th
- Taça de Portugal: Quarter-finals
- Taça da Liga: Second round
Home colours	Away colours	Third colours

The 2021–22 season is the 72nd season in the existence of Portimonense S.C. and the club's third consecutive season in the top flight of Portuguese football. In addition to the domestic league, Portimonense S.C. participated in this season's editions of the Taça de Portugal and the Taça da Liga.

== Players ==
=== First-team squad ===
As of 16 February 2022

Note: Flags indicate national team as defined under FIFA eligibility rules; some limited exceptions apply. Players may hold more than one non-FIFA nationality.

No.	Pos.	Nation	Player
3	DF	BRA	Lucas Possignolo
4	DF	BRA	Willyan Rocha
6	MF	POR	Henrique Jocú
7	MF	BRA	Ewerton
8	MF	BRA	Lucas Fernandes
9	FW	BRA	Fabrício
10	MF	JPN	Shoya Nakajima (on loan from Porto)
11	FW	BRA	Anderson Oliveira
12	GK	IRI	Payam Niazmand
13	FW	JPN	Shuhei Kawasaki
18	DF	MAR	Fahd Moufi
20	MF	BRA	Luquinha
21	MF	POR	Pedro Sá

No.	Pos.	Nation	Player
22	DF	POR	Filipe Relvas
23	DF	MAR	Achraf Lazaar
25	MF	COD	Giannelli Imbula
26	DF	GBS	Sana Gomes
32	GK	JPN	Kosuke Nakamura
39	FW	COL	Wilinton Aponzá
44	DF	BRA	Pedrão (on loan from Palmeiras)
45	FW	BRA	João Veras
70	FW	COL	Iván Angulo (on loan from Palmeiras)
76	FW	BRA	Carlinhos
91	FW	BRA	Renato Júnior (on loan from Água Santa)
93	FW	BRA	Welinton Júnior
94	GK	BRA	Samuel Portugal

=== Other players under contract ===
Note: Flags indicate national team as defined under FIFA eligibility rules; some limited exceptions apply. Players may hold more than one non-FIFA nationality.

No.	Pos.	Nation	Player
—	DF	BRA	Jadson
—	MF	BRA	Rômulo

=== Out on loan ===
Note: Flags indicate national team as defined under FIFA eligibility rules; some limited exceptions apply. Players may hold more than one non-FIFA nationality.

No.	Pos.	Nation	Player
—	GK	BRA	Léo (to Sporting da Covilhã until 30 June 2022)
—	GK	BRA	Raphael Aflalo (to Felgueiras until 30 June 2022)
—	DF	BRA	Henrique (to Farense until 30 June 2022)
—	DF	BRA	Jean Felipe (to Sporting da Covilhã until 30 June 2022)
—	DF	BRA	Jeferson Bahia (to Água Santa until 30 April 2022)

No.	Pos.	Nation	Player
—	MF	BRA	Felipe Dini (to Sporting da Covilhã until 30 June 2022)
—	MF	POR	Reko Silva (to Estrela until 30 June 2022)
—	MF	POR	Jorge Vilela (to Sporting da Covilhã until 30 June 2022)
—	FW	GBS	Beto (at Udinese until 30 June 2022)
—	FW	BRA	Iury (to Ceará until 31 December 2022)
—	FW	NGR	Abraham Marcus (on loan to Radomiak Radom until 30 June 2022)

== Pre-season and friendlies ==
Win Draw Loss Fixtures

17 July 2021 Friendly	Portimonense (Portugal)	1–1	(Portugal) Braga	Braga, Portugal
10:00 WEST (UTC+1)	Fabrício 21' (pen.)	Report	Ruiz 2'	Stadium: Estádio Municipal de Braga

== Competitions ==
=== Overall record ===
Competition	First match	Last match	Starting round	Final position	Record							
Competition	First match	Last match	Starting round	Final position	Pld	W	D	L	GF	GA	GD	Win %
Primeira Liga	8 August 2021	May 2022	Matchday 1		34	10	8	16	31	45	−14	29.41
Taça de Portugal	17 October 2021	13 January 2022	Third round	Quarter-finals	4	1	2	1	9	8	+1	25.00
Taça da Liga	23 July 2021	1 August 2021	First round	Second round	2	1	0	1	2	3	−1	50.00
Total					40	12	10	18	42	56	−14	30.00

Last updated: 16 April 2022
Source: Soccerway

=== Primeira Liga ===
==== League table ====
Pos	Team	Pld	W	D	L	GF	GA	GD	Pts
11	Paços de Ferreira	34	9	11	14	29	44	−15	38 (Note: Head-to-head points: Marítimo 10, Paços de Ferreira 8, Boavista 7, Portimonense 6.)
12	Boavista	34	7	17	10	39	52	−13	38
13	Portimonense	34	10	8	16	31	45	−14	38
14	Vizela	34	7	12	15	37	58	−21	33
15	Arouca	34	7	10	17	30	54	−24	31

Source: Liga Portugal
Rules for classification: 1) Points; 2) Head-to-head points; 3) Head-to-head goal difference; 4) Head-to-head away goals scored; 5) Goal difference; 6) Matches won; 7) Goals scored; 8) Play-off.

==== Results summary ====
Overall								Home						Away					
Pld	W	D	L	GF	GA	GD	Pts	W	D	L	GF	GA	GD	W	D	L	GF	GA	GD
5	2	1	2	5	3	+2	7	0	0	2	0	2	−2	2	1	0	5	1	+4

Last updated: 12 September 2021.
Source: Liga Portugal

==== Results by round ====
Round	1	2	3	4	5	6	7	8	9	10	11	12	13	14	15	16	17	18	19	20	21	22	23	24	25	26	27	28	29	30
Ground	A	H	A	H	A	H	H	A	H	A	H	A	H	A	H	A	H	H	A	H	A	H	A	A	H	A	H	A	H	A
Result	W	L	W	L	D	W	D	W	L	L	W	W	L	W	D	L	L	D	L	L	D	D	D	D	L	L	L	L	L	L
Position	9	9	5	7	7	6	6	5	6	6	6	6	6	6	6	6	7	7	8	8	8	9	9	9	9	11	11	12	12	12

Updated to match(es) played on 16 April 2022. Source: Liga Portugal
A = Away; H = Home; W = Win; D = Draw; L = Loss

==== Matches ====
8 August 2021 1	Vitória de Guimarães	0–1	Portimonense	Guimarães
15:30 WEST (UTC+1)		Report	Beto 86'	Stadium: Estádio D. Afonso Henriques; Attendance: 8,824; Referee: Fábio Melo

15 August 2021 2	Portimonense	0–1	Gil Vicente	Portimão
15:30 WEST (UTC+1)		Report	Lino 59'	Stadium: Estádio Municipal de Portimão; Attendance: 717; Referee: Rui Costa

22 August 2021 3	Tondela	0–3	Portimonense	Tondela
15:30 WEST (UTC+1)		Report	Beto 35'; Boa Morte 45+1' (pen.); Candé 80'	Stadium: Estádio João Cardoso; Attendance: 906; Referee: Luís Godinho

29 August 2021 4	Portimonense	0–1	Paços de Ferreira	Portimão
20:30 WEST (UTC+1)		Report	Tanque 45'	Stadium: Estádio Municipal de Portimão; Attendance: 1,098; Referee: João Pinheiro

12 September 2021 5	Boavista	1–1	Portimonense	Porto
18:00 WEST (UTC+1)	Musa 90+2'	Report	Carlinhos 45'	Stadium: Estádio do Bessa; Attendance: 2,416; Referee: André Narciso

3 October 2021 8	Benfica	0–1	Portimonense	Lisbon
18:00 WEST (UTC+1)	Yaremchuk (yellow card) 12'; Núñez (yellow card) 43'	Report	Boa Morte (yellow card) 44'; Carlinhos (yellow card) 60'; Possignolo (yellow card) 62', (goal) 66'; Samuel (yellow card) 80'; Rocha (yellow card) 90'	Stadium: Estádio da Luz; Attendance: 38,845; Referee: Fábio Veríssimo

1 November 2021 10	Braga	3–0	Portimonense	Braga
19:00 WET (UTC±0)	Galeno 5', 53'; Mario González 90+1'	Report		Stadium: Estádio Municipal de Braga; Attendance: 6,393; Referee: Gustavo Correia

6 November 2021 11	Portimonense	2–0	Belenenses SAD	Portimão
18:00 WET (UTC±0)	Nakajima 10'; Imbula (yellow card) 24'; Pedrão (yellow card) 54'; Lucas (yellow card) 63'; Aylton (yellow card) 73'; Samuel (yellow card) 78'; Pedro Sá 83'	Report	A. Sousa (yellow card) 2'; Chima (yellow card) 11'; Phete (yellow card) 78'; C. Sousa (yellow card) 90+3'	Stadium: Estádio Municipal de Portimão; Attendance: 1,185; Referee: António Nobre

3 December 2021 13	Portimonense	0–3	Porto	Portimão
19:00 WET (UTC±0)		Report	Pedro Sá 45+3' (o.g.); Vitinha 70'; Otávio 75'	Stadium: Estádio Municipal de Portimão; Referee: Manuel Oliveira

18 December 2021 15	Portimonense	1–1	Arouca	Portimão
15:30 WET (UTC±0)	Willyan (yellow card) 11'; Candé (yellow card) 69'; Luquinha 70'; Carlinhos (yellow card) 88'	Report	A. Silva 51'; Bukia (yellow card) 21'; Campi (yellow card) 81'; Leandro (yellow card) 87'; Kouassi (yellow card) 88'	Stadium: Estádio Municipal de Portimão; Attendance: 767; Referee: Miguel Nogueira

29 December 2021 16	Sporting CP	3–2	Portimonense	Lisbon
21:00 WET (UTC±0)	Paulinho 65', 76', 83'	Report	Reis 21' (o.g.); Possignolo 90+2'	Stadium: Estádio José Alvalade; Attendance: 21,038; Referee: António Nobre

5 March 2022 25	Portimonense	1–2	Benfica	Portimão
18:00 WET (UTC±0)	Welinton Júnior 25', (yellow card) 45+8'; Rocha (yellow card) 45+7'; Dacosta (yellow card) 45+15'; Possignolo (yellow card) 63'; Luquinha (yellow card) 74'	Report	Vertonghen (yellow card) 41'; Grimaldo 45+7'; Ramos 50', (yellow card) 57'; Bernardo (yellow card) 90+2'	Stadium: Estádio Municipal de Portimão; Attendance: 3,880; Referee: Fábio Veríssimo

20 March 2022 27	Portimonense	1–2	Braga	Portimão
20:00 WET (UTC±0)	Carmo 63' (o.g.)	Report	Moura 5'; Couto 22'	Stadium: Estádio Municipal de Portimão; Attendance: 894; Referee: Rui Costa

2 April 2022 28	Belenenses SAD	2–0	Portimonense	Oeiras
15:30 WEST (UTC+1)	Safira 11' (pen.); Phete (yellow card) 32'; Baraye (yellow card) 75'; Sandro (yellow card) 75'; Calila (yellow card) 88'; Nuno 90+4'; Monteiro (yellow card) 90+6'	Report	Possignolo (yellow card) 10'; Willyan (red card) 37'; Pedrão (yellow card) 42'; Welinton Júnior (yellow card) 90'	Stadium: Estádio Nacional; Attendance: 1,409; Referee: Hélder Malheiro

16 April 2022 30	Porto	7–0	Portimonense	Porto
20:30 WEST (UTC+1)	Taremi 19', 34' (pen.), 47'; Grujić 28'; Evanilson 40', 60'; Pepe 55'	Report		Stadium: Estádio do Dragão; Attendance: 48,109; Referee: Tiago Martins

=== Taça de Portugal ===
17 October 2021 Third round	Oliveirense	3–3 (a.e.t.) (4–5 p)	Portimonense	Oliveira de Azeméis
17:00 WEST (UTC+1)	Silva 35'; Paredes 85'; Alves 119'	Report	Renato Júnior 19', 55'; Fernandes 113'	Stadium: Estádio Carlos Osório; Referee: Helder Malheiro

19 November 2021 Fourth round	Penafiel	0–3	Portimonense	Penafiel
18:45 WET (UTC±0)		Report	Boa Morte 26', 30'; Angulo 42'	Stadium: Estádio Municipal 25 de Abril; Referee: Manuel Mota

21 December 2021 Fifth round	Famalicão	1–1 (a.e.t.) (2–4 p)	Portimonense	Vila Nova de Famalicão
20:45 WET (UTC±0)	Bruno Rodrigues 83'	Report	Boa Morte 46'	Stadium: Estádio Municipal 22 de Junho; Referee: Manuel Oliveira

13 January 2022 Quarter-finals	Portimonense	2–4	Mafra	Portimão
20:45 WET (UTC±0)	Nakajima 31'; Boa Morte 90+1'	Report	Martins 4'; Ferreira 16' (pen.); Pedro Lucas 36'; Bura 71' (pen.)	Stadium: Estádio Municipal de Portimão; Referee: Hélder Malheiro

=== Taça da Liga ===
23 July 2021 First round	Portimonense	2–1	Académica	Portimão
20:15 WEST (UTC+1)	Rocha 19'; Boa Morte 42'	Report	Traquina 31'	Stadium: Estádio Municipal de Portimão; Attendance: 0 Referee: André Narciso

1 August 2021 Second round	Boavista	2–0	Portimonense	Porto
20:30 WEST (UTC+1)	Morais 8', 73'	Report		Stadium: Estádio do Bessa; Attendance: 1,068; Referee: João Gonçalves
