= 2021–22 S.L. Benfica season =

Benfica
2021–22 season
- President: Luís Filipe Vieira (until 15 July 2021); Rui Costa (interim from 9 July to 10 October 2021)
- Head coach: Jorge Jesus (until 28 December 2021); Nélson Veríssimo (caretaker)
- Stadium: Estádio da Luz
- Primeira Liga: 3rd
- Taça de Portugal: Fifth round
- Taça da Liga: Runners-up
- UEFA Champions League: Quarter-finals
- Top goalscorer: League: Darwin Núñez (26); All: Darwin Núñez (34)
- Highest home attendance: 59,633 v Liverpool (5 April 2022)
- Lowest home attendance: 13,973 v Arouca (14 August 2021)
- Average home league attendance: 31,956
- Biggest win: Belenenses SAD 0–7 Benfica (27 November 2021)
- Biggest defeat: Benfica 0–4 Bayern Munich (20 October 2021)
Home colours	Away colours	Third colours

The 2021–22 Sport Lisboa e Benfica season was the club's 118th season in existence and its 88th consecutive season in the top flight of Portuguese football. Domestically, Benfica played in the Primeira Liga, were eliminated in the fifth round of Taça de Portugal, and reached the Taça da Liga final. In Europe, Benfica reached the quarter-finals of the UEFA Champions League. The season started on 4 August 2021, with the third qualifying round of the Champions League, and concluded on 13 May 2022 with a third-place finish in the league. This was Benfica's second consecutive season and third year without any trophy won.

== Players ==
=== First-team squad ===
As of 31 August 2021

Note: Flags indicate national team as defined under FIFA eligibility rules; some limited exceptions apply. Players may hold more than one non-FIFA nationality.

No.	Pos.	Nation	Player
1	GK	SRB	Mile Svilar
2	DF	BRA	Gilberto
3	DF	ESP	Álex Grimaldo
4	DF	BRA	Lucas Veríssimo
5	DF	BEL	Jan Vertonghen
7	MF	BRA	Everton
9	FW	URU	Darwin Núñez
11	MF	FRA	Soualiho Meïté
14	FW	SUI	Haris Seferovic
15	FW	UKR	Roman Yaremchuk
17	DF	POR	Diogo Gonçalves
18	FW	BRA	Rodrigo Pinho
20	MF	POR	João Mário
21	MF	POR	Pizzi
22	DF	AUT	Valentino Lazaro (on loan from Inter Milan)

No.	Pos.	Nation	Player
23	MF	SRB	Nemanja Radonjić (on loan from Marseille)
27	MF	POR	Rafa Silva
28	MF	GER	Julian Weigl
30	DF	ARG	Nicolás Otamendi (captain)
31	DF	POR	Gil Dias
34	DF	POR	André Almeida
49	MF	MAR	Adel Taarabt
55	MF	POR	Paulo Bernardo
77	GK	BRA	Helton Leite
83	MF	POR	Gedson Fernandes
88	FW	POR	Gonçalo Ramos
91	DF	BRA	Morato
97	DF	POR	Ferro
99	GK	GRE	Odysseas Vlachodimos

== Transfers ==
=== In ===
No.	Pos	Player	Transferred from	Fee	Date	Source
18	FW	(Brazil) Rodrigo Pinho	(Portugal) Marítimo	Free	1 July 2021	
31	DF	(Portugal) Gil Dias	(France) Monaco	€1,500,000	1 July 2021	
20	MF	(Portugal) João Mário	(Italy) Inter Milan	Free	13 July 2021	
11	MF	(France) Soualiho Meïté	(Italy) Torino	€7,000,000	23 July 2021	
15	FW	(Ukraine) Roman Yaremchuk	(Belgium) Gent	€17,000,000	31 July 2021	
23	MF	(Serbia) Nemanja Radonjić	(France) Marseille	Loan	22 August 2021	
22	DF	(Austria) Valentino Lazaro	(Italy) Inter Milan	Loan	31 August 2021	
Disclosed total
€25,500,000

=== Out ===
No.	Pos	Player	Transferred to	Fee	Date	Source(s)
33	DF	(Brazil) Jardel		Released	1 July 2021	
38	MF	(Brazil) Pedrinho	(Ukraine) Shakhtar Donetsk	€18,000,000	1 July 2021	
11	MF	(Argentina) Franco Cervi	(Spain) Celta Vigo	€4,000,000	5 July 2021	
	MF	(Brazil) Caio Lucas	(United Arab Emirates) Sharjah FC	€2,000,000	6 July 2021	
	MF	(Portugal) Tiago Dantas	(Portugal) Tondela	Loan	7 July 2021	
71	DF	(Portugal) Nuno Tavares	(England) Arsenal	€8,000,000	10 July 2021	
	MF	(Portugal) Nuno Santos	(Portugal) Paços de Ferreira	Loan	11 July 2021	
	MF	(Croatia) Filip Krovinović	(Croatia) Hajduk Split	€1,500,000	19 July 2021	
	MF	(Guinea-Bissau) Alfa Semedo	(Portugal) Vitória de Guimarães	€1,500,000	29 July 2021	
10	FW	(Germany) Luca Waldschmidt	(Germany) Wolfsburg	€12,000,000	22 August 2021	
61	MF	(Portugal) Florentino Luís	(Spain) Getafe	Loan	31 August 2021	
13	MF	(Portugal) Jota	(Scotland) Celtic	Loan	31 August 2021	
95	FW	(Brazil) Carlos Vinícius	(Netherlands) PSV Eindhoven	Loan	31 August 2021	
22	MF	(Greece) Andreas Samaris		Released	31 August 2021	
19	MF	(Portugal) Chiquinho	(Portugal) Braga	Loan	31 August 2021	
8	MF	(Brazil) Gabriel	(Qatar) Al-Gharafa	Loan	28 September 2021	
Disclosed total
€47,000,000

== Pre-season friendlies ==
Win Draw Loss Fixtures Cancelled

16 July 2021 Friendly	Benfica	v	Gent	Faro/Loulé, Portugal
		Report		Stadium: Estádio Algarve

16 July 2021 Friendly	Benfica	2–1	Casa Pia	Seixal, Portugal
19:00 WEST (UTC+01:00)	Ramos 14'; Kelechi 79' (o.g.)	Report	Banjaqui 60' (pen.)	Stadium: Benfica Campus; Attendance: 0 (Note: The match was played behind closed doors due to the COVID-19 pandemic in Portugal.); Referee: João Gonçalves (Porto)

18 July 2021 Friendly	Benfica	v	Boavista	Faro/Loulé, Portugal
		Report		Stadium: Estádio Algarve

18 July 2021 Friendly	Benfica	2–1	Almería	Seixal, Portugal
19:00 WEST (UTC+01:00)	Pizzi 15' (pen.); Waldschmidt 56'	Report	Villar 68'	Stadium: Benfica Campus; Attendance: 0 Referee: António Nobre (Leiria)

22 July 2021 Friendly	Benfica	1–0	Lille	Faro/Loulé, Portugal
20:00 WEST (UTC+01:00)	Ramos 28'	Report		Stadium: Estádio Algarve; Attendance: 0 Referee: João Gonçalves (Porto)

25 July 2021 Friendly	Benfica	1–1	Marseille	Lisbon, Portugal
20:00 WEST (UTC+01:00)	Pizzi 14' (pen.)	Report	Payet 38'	Stadium: Estádio da Luz; Attendance: 0 Referee: Luís Godinho (Évora)

Non-televised friendlies, played at Benfica Campus:

- Benfica 0–1 Benfica B (3 July)
- Benfica 2–0 Sporting da Covilhã (7 July)
- Benfica 3–2 Farense (10 July)
- Benfica 0–0 Belenenses SAD (13 July)

== Competitions ==
=== Overall record ===
Competition	First match	Last match	Starting round	Final position	Record							
Competition	First match	Last match	Starting round	Final position	Pld	W	D	L	GF	GA	GD	Win %
Primeira Liga	7 August 2021	13 May 2022	Matchday 1	3rd	34	23	5	6	78	30	+48	67.65
Taça de Portugal	16 October 2021	23 December 2021	Third round	Fifth round	3	2	0	1	6	5	+1	66.67
Taça da Liga	27 October 2021	29 January 2022	Third round	Runners-up	4	1	2	1	8	6	+2	25.00
UEFA Champions League	4 August 2021	13 April 2022	Third qualifying round	Quarter-finals	14	6	5	3	20	18	+2	42.86
Total					55	32	12	11	112	59	+53	58.18

Last updated: 13 May 2022
Source: Soccerway

=== Primeira Liga ===
==== League table ====
Pos	Team	Pld	W	D	L	GF	GA	GD	Pts	Qualification or relegation
1	Porto (C)	34	29	4	1	86	22	+64	91	Qualification for the Champions League group stage
2	Sporting CP	34	27	4	3	73	23	+50	85	Qualification for the Champions League group stage
3	Benfica	34	23	5	6	78	30	+48	74	Qualification for the Champions League third qualifying round
4	Braga	34	19	8	7	52	31	+21	65	Qualification for the Europa League group stage (Note: Since the winners of the 2021–22 Taça de Portugal, Porto, qualified for the Champions League based on league position, the spot awarded to the fourth-placed team (Europa Conference League third qualifying round) was passed to the fifth-placed team, and the spot awarded to the fifth-placed team (Europa Conference League second qualifying round) was passed to the sixth-placed team.)
5	Gil Vicente	34	13	12	9	47	42	+5	51	Qualification for the Europa Conference League third qualifying round

Source: Liga Portugal
Rules for classification: 1) Points; 2) Head-to-head points; 3) Head-to-head goal difference; 4) Head-to-head away goals scored; 5) Goal difference; 6) Matches won; 7) Goals scored; 8) Play-off.
(C) Champions

==== Results summary ====
Overall								Home						Away					
Pld	W	D	L	GF	GA	GD	Pts	W	D	L	GF	GA	GD	W	D	L	GF	GA	GD
34	23	5	6	78	30	+48	74	10	3	4	36	16	+20	13	2	2	42	14	+28

Last updated: 13 May 2022.

==== Results by round ====
Round	1	2	3	4	5	6	7	8	9	10	11	12	13	14	15	16	17	18	19	20	21	22	23	24	25	26	27	28	29	30	31	32	33	34
Ground	A	H	A	H	A	H	A	H	A	A	H	A	H	A	H	A	H	H	A	H	A	H	A	H	A	H	H	A	H	A	H	A	H	A
Result	W	W	W	W	W	W	W	L	W	D	W	W	L	W	W	L	W	D	W	L	W	W	D	W	W	D	W	L	W	W	D	W	L	W
Position	8	3	2	1	1	1	1	1	1	3	3	3	3	3	3	3	3	3	3	3	3	3	3	3	3	3	3	3	3	3	3	3	3	3
Points	3	6	9	12	15	18	21	21	24	25	28	31	31	34	37	37	40	41	44	44	47	50	51	54	57	58	61	61	64	67	68	71	71	74

Updated to match(es) played on 13 May 2022. Source: Liga Portugal
A = Away; H = Home; W = Win; D = Draw; L = Loss

==== Matches ====
7 August 2021 1	Moreirense	1–2	Benfica	Moreira de Cónegos
18:00 WEST (UTC+01:00)	Martins 30'; Soares (yellow card) 36'; Pires (yellow card) 69'; Artur Jorge (yellow card) 75'; Pacheco (yellow card) 90+3'	Report	Veríssimo 8'; Waldschmidt 19'; Taarabt (yellow card) 33'; Gonçalves (red card) 56'; Weigl (yellow card) 60'; Meïté (yellow card) 81'; R. Silva (yellow card) 90+8'	Stadium: Parque de Jogos Comendador Joaquim de Almeida Freitas; Attendance: 1,498 (Note: The stadium's capacity was limited to 33% due to the COVID-19 pandemic in Portugal.); Referee: Vítor Ferreira (Braga)

14 August 2021 2	Benfica	2–0	Arouca	Lisbon
18:00 WEST (UTC+01:00)	Waldschmidt 38'; Yaremchuk 44'; Morato (yellow card) 85'	Report	Braga (red card) 8'	Stadium: Estádio da Luz; Attendance: 13,973; Referee: Manuel Mota (Braga)

21 August 2021 3	Gil Vicente	0–2	Benfica	Barcelos
18:00 WEST (UTC+01:00)	Cunha (yellow card) 24'; Fujimoto (yellow card) 66'; Kritsyuk (yellow card) 75'	Report	Gilberto (yellow card) 44'; Veríssimo 83'; Grimaldo 88'; Núñez (yellow card) 90'	Stadium: Estádio Cidade de Barcelos; Attendance: 3,751; Referee: Nuno Almeida (Algarve)

29 August 2021 4	Benfica	2–1	Tondela	Lisbon
18:00 WEST (UTC+01:00)	Pizzi (yellow card) 9'; Everton (yellow card) 50'; R. Silva 71'; Gilberto 88'	Report	Khacef (yellow card) 19'; Agra 22'; Niasse (yellow card) 35'; Undabarrena (yellow card) 56'	Stadium: Estádio da Luz; Attendance: 19,425; Referee: Tiago Martins (Lisbon)

11 September 2021 5	Santa Clara	0–5	Benfica	Ponta Delgada
17:00 AZOST (UTC±00:00)	Ramos (yellow card) 45+3'; Mansur (yellow card) 47'	Report	Vlachodimos (yellow card) 28'; Pinho 42'; Núñez 54', 62'; R. Silva 58'; Yaremchuk 68'	Stadium: Estádio de São Miguel; Attendance: 3,326 (Note: The stadium's capacity was limited to 50% due to the COVID-19 pandemic in Portugal.); Referee: Rui Costa (Porto)

20 September 2021 6	Benfica	3–1	Boavista	Lisbon
19:00 WEST (UTC+01:00)	Núñez 14', 61'; Weigl 34'; Veríssimo (yellow card) 59'	Report	Sauer 32'; Nathan (yellow card) 36'; Porozo (yellow card) 69'; Musa (yellow card) 74'	Stadium: Estádio da Luz; Attendance: 23,000; Referee: Hugo Miguel (Lisbon)

25 September 2021 7	Vitória de Guimarães	1–3	Benfica	Guimarães
18:00 WEST (UTC+01:00)	Bruno Duarte 78' (pen.)	Report	Yaremchuk 30', 41'; João Mário 73'; Otamendi (yellow card) 83'	Stadium: Estádio D. Afonso Henriques; Attendance: 14,222; Referee: Luís Godinho (Évora)

3 October 2021 8	Benfica	0–1	Portimonense	Lisbon
18:00 WEST (UTC+01:00)	Yaremchuk (yellow card) 12'; Núñez (yellow card) 43'	Report	Boa Morte (yellow card) 44'; Carlinhos (yellow card) 60'; Possignolo (yellow card) 62' (goal) 66'; Samuel (yellow card) 80'; Rocha (yellow card) 90'	Stadium: Estádio da Luz; Attendance: 38,845; Referee: Fábio Veríssimo (Leiria)

24 October 2021 9	Vizela	0–1	Benfica	Vizela
18:00 WEST (UTC+01:00)	Mendez (yellow card) 41'; Aidara (yellow card) 44'; Kiki (yellow card) 58'	Report	Veríssimo (yellow card) 68'; Radonjić (yellow card) 86'; Everton (yellow card) 90+6'; R. Silva 90+8'	Stadium: Estádio do FC Vizela; Attendance: 4,883; Referee: Luís Godinho (Évora)

30 October 2021 10	Estoril	1–1	Benfica	Estoril
19:00 WEST (UTC+01:00)	Lourenço (yellow card) 42'; Áfrico (yellow card) 54'; Rosier 90'; Geraldes (yellow card) 90+4'	Report	Veríssimo 2' (yellow card) 75'; Radonjić (yellow card) 55'	Stadium: Estádio António Coimbra da Mota; Attendance: 4,128; Referee: João Pinheiro (Braga)

7 November 2021 11	Benfica	6–1	Braga	Lisbon
21:15 WET (UTC±00:00)	Grimaldo 2'; Núñez 38'; R. Silva 42', 45+3'; Gilberto (yellow card) 48'; Everton 52', 59'; Pizzi (yellow card) 81'; Ramos (yellow card) 83'	Report	R. Horta 12'; Musrati (yellow card) 26'; Mineiro (yellow card) 90'	Stadium: Estádio da Luz; Attendance: 40,577; Referee: Artur Soares Dias (Porto)

27 November 2021 12	Belenenses SAD	0–7 (Note: The match ended in the 48th minute because Belenenses SAD were down to six players after playing with nine men in the first-half.)	Benfica	Oeiras
20:30 WET (UTC±00:00)		Report	Kau 1' (o.g.); Seferovic 14', 39' (pen.); Weigl 27'; Núñez 32', 34', 45'	Stadium: Estádio Nacional; Attendance: 6,096; Referee: Manuel Mota (Braga)

3 December 2021 13	Benfica	1–3	Sporting CP	Lisbon
21:15 WET (UTC±00:00)	Vertonghen (yellow card) 22'; Weigl (yellow card) 27'; Taarabt (yellow card) 89'; Pizzi 90+5'	Report	Paulinho (yellow card) 1' (goal) 62'; Feddal (yellow card) 1'; Sarabia 8' (yellow card) 33'; Porro (yellow card) 20'; Gonçalves (yellow card) 45+3'; Nunes 68'; Esgaio (yellow card) 73'	Stadium: Estádio da Luz; Attendance: 48,790; Referee: Artur Soares Dias (Porto)

12 December 2021 14	Famalicão	1–4	Benfica	Vila Nova de Famalicão
18:00 WET (UTC±00:00)	Rodrigues 25'; Ivo (yellow card) 45+1'; Riccieli (yellow card) 74'	Report	Gonçalves (yellow card) 3'; Núñez 6', 15', 55'; R. Silva 46'; Weigl (yellow card) 74'	Stadium: Estádio Municipal 22 de Junho; Attendance: 3,994; Referee: Hugo Miguel (Lisbon)

19 December 2021 15	Benfica	7–1	Marítimo	Lisbon
17:00 WET (UTC±00:00)	Núñez 3', 19' (yellow card) 7'; Gilberto 33'; R. Silva 48'; Yaremchuk 56'; Ramos 86'; Seferovic 90+1'	Report	Rossi (yellow card) 16'; Costa (yellow card) 45+1'; Alipour 81'	Stadium: Estádio da Luz; Attendance: 27,814; Referee: António Nobre (Leiria)

30 December 2021 16	Porto	3–1	Benfica	Porto
21:00 WET (UTC±00:00)	Cardoso (yellow card) 30'; Vieira 34'; Pepê 37', (yellow card) 52'; Taremi 69'; Martínez (yellow card) 90+1'	Report	Almeida (yellow card) 8' (yellow-red card) 49'; Vertonghen (yellow card) 26'; Yaremchuk 46'; Gonçalves (yellow card) 90+1'; Gilberto (yellow card) 90+3'	Stadium: Estádio do Dragão; Attendance: 46,250; Referee: Hugo Miguel (Lisbon)

9 January 2022 17	Benfica	2–0	Paços de Ferreira	Lisbon
18:00 WET (UTC±00:00)	Otamendi (yellow card) 25'; Mário 45+5'; Grimaldo 75'; Bernardo (yellow card) 90+1'	Report	Fonseca (yellow card) 45+2'; Antunes (yellow card) 57'; Djaló (yellow card) 90'; Denílson (red card) 45+2'	Stadium: Estádio da Luz; Attendance: 26,268; Referee: Vítor Ferreira (Braga)

15 January 2022 18	Benfica	1–1	Moreirense	Lisbon
18:00 WET (UTC±00:00)	R. Silva (yellow card) 55'; Núñez 65'; Otamendi (yellow card) 86'; Grimaldo (yellow card) 90+6'	Report	Pacheco (yellow card) 40'; Martins (yellow card) 45+1'; Gilberto 61' (o.g.); Paulinho (yellow card) 72'; Jorge (yellow card) 89'; Kewin (yellow card) 90+6'	Stadium: Estádio da Luz; Attendance: 29,188; Referee: Rui Costa (Porto)

21 January 2022 19	Arouca	0–2	Benfica	Arouca
19:00 WET (UTC±00:00)	Basso (penalty missed) 41'; Adílio (yellow card) 46'; Moreira (yellow card) 56'; Quaresma (yellow card) 90+1'; Ba (yellow card) 90+3'; Kouassi (yellow card) 90+5'	Report	Núñez 32' (pen.); Grimaldo (yellow card) 43'; Ramos 90+2'	Stadium: Estádio Municipal de Arouca; Attendance: 2,387; Referee: Nuno Almeida (Algarve)

2 February 2022 20	Benfica	1–2	Gil Vicente	Lisbon
20:15 WET (UTC±00:00)	Vertonghen (yellow card) 8'; Otamendi (yellow card) 30'; Gonçalves (yellow card) 40'; João Mário (yellow card) 53'; Ramos 88'	Report	Lino 11'; Navarro (yellow card) 26'; Aburjania 64'; Zé Carlos (yellow card) 68'; Andrew (yellow card) 74'	Stadium: Estádio da Luz; Attendance: 21,979; Referee: Artur Soares Dias (Porto)

7 February 2022 21	Tondela	1–3	Benfica	Tondela
19:00 WET (UTC±00:00)	Borges (yellow card) 39' (yellow-red card) 65'; Quaresma 88'	Report	Everton 23'; Núñez 34'; Ramos 53'	Stadium: Estádio João Cardoso; Attendance: 3,973; Referee: João Pinheiro (Braga)

12 February 2022 22	Benfica	2–1	Santa Clara	Lisbon
18:00 WET (UTC±00:00)	R. Silva (yellow card) 24'; Núñez (yellow card) 40', (goal) 60' (pen.), 62'; Weigl (yellow card) 82'	Report	Mohebi 21', (yellow card) 28'; Morita (yellow card) 32'; Barreto (yellow card) 40'; Rocha (yellow card) 45'; Villanueva (yellow card) 59'	Stadium: Estádio da Luz; Attendance: 30,905; Referee: Hélder Malheiro (Lisbon)

18 February 2022 23	Boavista	2–2	Benfica	Porto
20:15 WET (UTC±00:00)	Pérez (yellow card) 40'; García (yellow card) 47'; Gorré (yellow card) 69'; Gustavo 74'; Makouta 80'; Musa (yellow card) 84'; Hamache (yellow card) 90'	Report	Weigl (yellow card) 15'; Taarabt 21'; Otamendi (yellow card) 27'; Grimaldo 30', (yellow card) 84'	Stadium: Estádio do Bessa; Attendance: 7,903; Referee: Rui Costa (Porto)

27 February 2022 24	Benfica	3–0	Vitória de Guimarães	Lisbon
18:00 WET (UTC±00:00)	Ramos 23'; Everton (yellow card) 35'; Núñez 37', 51' (pen.)	Report	Semedo (yellow card) 3'; Mumin (yellow card) 56'	Stadium: Estádio da Luz; Attendance: 39,846; Referee: André Narciso (Porto)

5 March 2022 25	Portimonense	1–2	Benfica	Portimão
18:00 WET (UTC±00:00)	Welinton Júnior 25', (yellow card) 45+8'; Rocha (yellow card) 45+7'; Dacosta (yellow card) 45+15'; Possignolo (yellow card) 63'; Luquinha (yellow card) 74'	Report	Vertonghen (yellow card) 41'; Grimaldo 45+7'; Ramos 50', (yellow card) 57'; Bernardo (yellow card) 90+2'	Stadium: Estádio Municipal de Portimão; Attendance: 3,880; Referee: Fábio Veríssimo (Leiria)

11 March 2022 26	Benfica	1–1	Vizela	Lisbon
20:15 WET (UTC±00:00)	Taarabt (red card) 7'; Núñez (yellow card) 64'; Araújo 75'	Report	Rashid (yellow card) 11'; Wilson (yellow card) 16'; Afonso (yellow card) 45'; Cassiano 65'; Bondoso (yellow card) 78'; Mendez (yellow card) 90+3'; Claudemir (yellow card) 90+5'	Stadium: Estádio da Luz; Attendance: 31,546; Referee: Manuel Oliveira (Porto)

20 March 2022 27	Benfica	2–1	Estoril	Lisbon
18:00 WET (UTC±00:00)	Weigl (yellow card) 29'; R. Silva 34'; Ramos 53'	Report	Acevedo (yellow card) 10'; Joãozinho (yellow card) 81'; Franco 90+3'	Stadium: Estádio da Luz; Attendance: 36,768; Referee: Nuno Almeida (Algarve)

1 April 2022 28	Braga	3–2	Benfica	Braga
20:15 WEST (UTC+01:00)	Ruiz (yellow card) 8'; Medeiros 28'; Al-Musrati (yellow card) 30'; A. Horta 59'; Oliveira 79'	Report	Vertonghen (yellow card) 26'; Núñez 74' (pen.); João Mário 77'	Stadium: Estádio Municipal de Braga; Attendance: 16,073; Referee: Luís Godinho (Évora)

9 April 2022 29	Benfica	3–1	Belenenses SAD	Lisbon
18:00 WEST (UTC+01:00)	Núñez 22', 54', 58'; Lazaro (yellow card) 88'	Report	Sousa 3'; Calila (yellow card) 33'; Sithole (yellow card) 45+1'; Camacho (yellow card) 48'; Tavares (yellow card) 69'; Varela (yellow card) 77'; Licá (yellow card) 85'	Stadium: Estádio da Luz; Attendance: 34,183; Referee: Gustavo Correia (Porto)

17 April 2022 30	Sporting CP	0–2	Benfica	Lisbon
20:30 WEST (UTC+01:00)	Sarabia (yellow card) 13'; Paulinho (yellow card) 51'	Report	Núñez 14'; Everton (yellow card) 41'; Vertonghen (yellow card) 51'; Taarabt (yellow card) 75'; Dias 90+3'	Stadium: Estádio José Alvalade; Attendance: 40,714; Referee: Fábio Veríssimo (Leiria)

23 April 2022 31	Benfica	0–0	Famalicão	Lisbon
18:00 WEST (UTC+01:00)	Gonçalves (yellow card) 34'; Weigl (yellow card) 78'	Report	Pickel (yellow card) 32'; Marín (yellow card) 54'; Riccieli (yellow card) 54'; Rodrigues (yellow card) 89'	Stadium: Estádio da Luz; Attendance: 37,894; Referee: António Nobre (Leiria)

30 April 2022 32	Marítimo	0–1	Benfica	Funchal
17:00 WEST (UTC+01:00)	Costa (yellow card) 41'; Winck (red card) 42'; Alipour (yellow card) 79'	Report	Núñez 2'; Otamendi (yellow card) 45+2'; Weigl (yellow card) 45+6'; Ramos (yellow card) 70'; Bernardo (yellow card) 73'	Stadium: Estádio do Marítimo; Attendance: 9,102; Referee: Hélder Malheiro (Lisbon)

7 May 2022 33	Benfica	0–1	Porto	Lisbon
18:00 WEST (UTC+01:00)	Dias (yellow card) 16'; Ramos (yellow card) 24'; Núñez (yellow card) 53'; Lazaro (yellow card) 62'; Almeida (yellow card) 71'; Otamendi (yellow card) 71'; João Mário (yellow card) 82'; Weigl (yellow card) 84'; Yaremchuk (yellow card) 90'; Gilberto (yellow card) 90+6'	Report	Grujić (yellow card) 30'; Pepe (yellow card) 40'; Taremi (yellow card) 79'; Costa (yellow card) 90+1'; Sanusi 90+4'	Stadium: Estádio da Luz; Attendance: 42,256; Referee: Luís Godinho (Évora)

13 May 2022 34	Paços de Ferreira	0–2	Benfica	Paços de Ferreira
20:15 WEST (UTC+01:00)	Fonseca (yellow card) 57'	Report	Araújo 4', 44'; Gilberto (yellow card) 53'	Stadium: Estádio da Mata Real; Referee: Hugo Silva (Lisbon)

=== Taça de Portugal ===
16 October 2021 Third round	Trofense	1–2 (a.e.t.)	Benfica	Trofa
20:15 WEST (UTC+01:00)	Pachu 80'; Faria (yellow card) 90+3'; Moreira (yellow card) 90+3'; João Paulo (yellow card) 102'		Everton 22' (yellow card) 110'; Meïté (yellow card) 24'; Lazaro (yellow card) 50'; Gilberto (yellow card) 90+7'; Almeida 94'; Leite (yellow card) 111'; Radonjić (yellow card) 120+2'	Stadium: Estádio do CD Trofense; Attendance: 4,265; Referee: António Nobre (Leiria)

19 November 2021 Fourth round	Benfica	4–1	Paços de Ferreira	Lisbon
20:45 WET (UTC±00:00)	Grimaldo 78'; Seferovic 81'; R. Silva 87'; Everton 90+3'		Maracás (yellow card) 30'; João Pedro (yellow card) 43'; Santos 52'; Pires (yellow card) 70'; Ibrahim (yellow card) 75'; Delgado (yellow card) 76'	Stadium: Estádio da Luz; Referee: Manuel Oliveira (Porto)

23 December 2021 Fifth round	Porto	3–0	Benfica	Porto
20:45 WET (UTC+00:00)	Evanilson 1', 31', (yellow card) 20' (yellow-red card) 45+2'; Vitinha 7'; Otávio (yellow card) 58'		Núñez (yellow card) 23'; Otamendi (yellow card) 29' (yellow-red card) 90+5'; Yaremchuk (yellow card) 73'	Stadium: Estádio do Dragão; Referee: Fábio Veríssimo (Leiria)

=== Taça da Liga ===
==== Third round ====
Pos	Team	Pld	W	D	L	GF	GA	GD	Pts	Qualification	BEN	GUI	SCC
1	Benfica	2	1	1	0	6	3	+3	4	Advance to knockout phase	—	—	3–0
2	Vitória de Guimarães	2	1	1	0	5	3	+2	4		3–3	—	—
3	Sporting da Covilhã	2	0	0	2	0	5	−5	0		—	0–2	—

Updated to match(es) played on 15 December 2021. Source: Liga Portugal
Rules for classification: Tiebreakers

27 October 2021 2	Vitória de Guimarães	3–3	Benfica	Guimarães
19:30 WEST (UTC+01:00)	André 21'; Estupiñán 45+2'; Bruno Duarte 82'; Janvier (yellow card) 86'	Report	Semedo 8' (o.g.); Pizzi 15'; João Mário (yellow card) 27'; Radonjić 28'; Veríssimo (yellow card) 37'	Stadium: Estádio D. Afonso Henriques; Attendance: 11,065; Referee: Hugo Miguel (Lisbon)

15 December 2021 3	Benfica	3–0	Sporting da Covilhã	Lisbon
19:00 WET (UTC±00:00)	Meïté (yellow card) 5'; Seferovic 27'; Núñez 67' (pen.), 72'; Taarabt (yellow card) 84'; Almeida (yellow card) 90+1'	Report	Tembeng (yellow card) 19' (yellow-red card) 39'; Héliton (yellow card) 43'; Arnold (yellow card) 85'	Stadium: Estádio da Luz; Attendance: 15,291; Referee: Gustavo Correia (Porto)

==== Semi-finals ====
25 January 2022	Benfica	1–1 (3–2 p)	Boavista	Leiria
19:45 WET (UTC±00:00)	Everton 16'; Bernardo (yellow card) 29'	Report	Musa (yellow card) 17'; Abascal (yellow card) 36'; Makouta (yellow card) 46'; Gustavo 53' (pen.)	Stadium: Estádio Municipal de Leiria; Attendance: 7,539; Referee: Fábio Veríssimo (Leiria)
	Penalties
	Pizzi (penalty missed); Grimaldo (penalty scored); Meïté (penalty scored); Vertonghen (penalty missed); Weigl (penalty scored)		(penalty missed) Pérez; (penalty missed) Musa; (penalty missed) De Santis; (penalty scored) Abascal; (penalty scored) Hamache

==== Final ====
29 January 2022	Benfica	1–2	Sporting CP	Leiria
19:45 WET (UTC±00:00)	Everton 23', (yellow card) 58'; Vertonghen (yellow card) 53'; João Mário (yellow card) 90+2'	Report	Neto (yellow card) 31'; Inácio 49'; Paulinho (yellow card) 53'; Nunes (yellow card) 59'; Esgaio (yellow card) 77'; Sarabia 78'	Stadium: Estádio Municipal de Leiria; Attendance: 20,622; Referee: Manuel Mota (Braga)

=== UEFA Champions League ===
==== Third qualifying round ====
The draw for the third qualifying round was held on 19 July 2021.

4 August 2021 First leg	Spartak Moscow (Russia)	0–2	(Portugal) Benfica	Moscow, Russia
20:00 MSK (UTC+03:00)	Sobolev (yellow card) 33'; Ignatov (yellow card) 87'	Report	Vertonghen (yellow card) 48'; R. Silva 51'; Gilberto 74'	Stadium: Otkritie Arena; Attendance: 2,933 (Note: The stadium's capacity was limited to 3,000 spectators due to the COVID-19 pandemic in Russia.); Referee: Srđan Jovanović (Serbia)

10 August 2021 Second leg	Benfica (Portugal)	2–0 (4–0 agg.)	(Russia) Spartak Moscow	Lisbon, Portugal
20:00 WEST (UTC+01:00)	Otamendi (yellow card) 16'; João Mário 58'; Weigl (yellow card) 71'; Gigot 90+2' (o.g.)	Report	Lomovitsky (yellow card) 25'; Larsson (yellow card) 68'	Stadium: Estádio da Luz; Attendance: 16,312; Referee: Anthony Taylor (England)

==== Play-off round ====
The draw for the play-off round was held on 2 August 2021.

18 August 2021 First leg	Benfica (Portugal)	2–1	(Netherlands) PSV Eindhoven	Lisbon, Portugal
20:00 WEST (UTC+01:00)	R. Silva 10' (yellow card) 61'; Weigl 42'; Otamendi (yellow card) 58'; Almeida (yellow card) 75'; Meïté (yellow card) 86'; Ramos (yellow card) 90+2'	Report	Gakpo 51'; Van Ginkel (yellow card) 57'; Obispo (yellow card) 88'	Stadium: Estádio da Luz; Attendance: 18,199; Referee: Felix Brych (Germany)

24 August 2021 Second leg	PSV Eindhoven (Netherlands)	0–0 (1–2 agg.)	(Portugal) Benfica	Eindhoven, Netherlands
21:00 CEST (UTC+02:00)	Boscagli (yellow card) 64'; Ramalho (yellow card) 85'; Thomas (yellow card) 90+1'	Report	Veríssimo (yellow card) 8' (yellow-red card) 32'; João Mário (yellow card) 66'; Ramos (yellow card) 82'; Vlachodimos (yellow card) 90+4'	Stadium: Philips Stadion; Attendance: 21,855; Referee: Slavko Vinčić (Slovenia)

==== Group stage ====
The draw for the group stage was held on 26 August 2021.

Pos	Team	Pld	W	D	L	GF	GA	GD	Pts	Qualification	BAY	BEN	BAR	DKV
1	(Germany) Bayern Munich	6	6	0	0	22	3	+19	18	Advance to knockout phase	—	5–2	3–0	5–0
2	(Portugal) Benfica	6	2	2	2	7	9	−2	8	Advance to knockout phase	0–4	—	3–0	2–0
3	(Spain) Barcelona	6	2	1	3	2	9	−7	7	Transfer to Europa League	0–3	0–0	—	1–0
4	(Ukraine) Dynamo Kyiv	6	0	1	5	1	11	−10	1		1–2	0–0	0–1	—

Source: UEFA
Rules for classification: Group stage tiebreakers

14 September 2021 1	Dynamo Kyiv (Ukraine)	0–0	(Portugal) Benfica	Kyiv, Ukraine
22:00 EEST (UTC+03:00)	Sydorchuk (yellow card) 52'; Zabarnyi (yellow card) 73'; Harmash (yellow card) 82'	Report	R. Silva (yellow card) 21'; Yaremchuk (yellow card) 44'; Weigl (yellow card) 71'	Stadium: NSC Olimpiyskiy Stadium; Attendance: 21,657; Referee: Anthony Taylor (England)

29 September 2021 2	Benfica (Portugal)	3–0	(Spain) Barcelona	Lisbon, Portugal
20:00 WEST (UTC+01:00)	Núñez 3', 79' (pen.); Otamendi (yellow card) 33'; R. Silva (yellow card) 56' (goal) 69'; Grimaldo (yellow card) 62'; Weigl (yellow card) 72'	Report	Piqué (yellow card) 12'; García (yellow card) 54' (yellow-red card) 87'; Dest (yellow card) 78'; N. González (yellow card) 86'	Stadium: Estádio da Luz; Attendance: 29,454; Referee: Daniele Orsato (Italy)

20 October 2021 3	Benfica (Portugal)	0–4	(Germany) Bayern Munich	Lisbon, Portugal
20:00 WEST (UTC+01:00)	Otamendi (yellow card) 45'; João Mário (yellow card) 51'	Report	Upamecano (yellow card) 56'; Hernandez (yellow card) 59'; Sané 70', 84'; Everton 80' (o.g.); Lewandowski 82'	Stadium: Estádio da Luz; Attendance: 55,201; Referee: Ovidiu Hațegan (Romania)

2 November 2021 4	Bayern Munich (Germany)	5–2	(Portugal) Benfica	Munich, Germany
21:00 CET (UTC+01:00)	Lewandowski 26', 61', 45+1' (penalty missed) 84'; Gnabry 32'; Sané 49'; Upamecano (yellow card) 51'; Nianzou (yellow card) 69'	Report	Morato 38'; Veríssimo (yellow card) 45'; Núñez 74'	Stadium: Allianz Arena; Attendance: 50,000; Referee: Szymon Marciniak (Poland)

23 November 2021 5	Barcelona (Spain)	0–0	(Portugal) Benfica	Barcelona, Spain
21:00 CET (UTC+01:00)	Piqué (yellow card) 49'	Report	Grimaldo (yellow card) 36'; João Mário (yellow card) 49'; Vlachodimos (yellow card) 90+2'; Taarabt (yellow card) 90+5'	Stadium: Camp Nou; Attendance: 49,572; Referee: Sergei Karasev (Russia)

8 December 2021 6	Benfica (Portugal)	2–0	(Ukraine) Dynamo Kyiv	Lisbon, Portugal
20:00 WET (UTC±00:00)	Yaremchuk 16'; Gilberto 22' (yellow card) 24'	Report	Zabarnyi (yellow card) 29'; Verbič (yellow card) 36'; Tsyhankov (yellow card) 44'	Stadium: Estádio da Luz; Attendance: 36,591; Referee: Deniz Aytekin (Germany)

==== Knockout phase ====
===== Round of 16 =====
The draw for the round of 16 was held on 13 December 2021. (Note: Benfica were initially drawn against Real Madrid.)

23 February 2022 First leg	Benfica (Portugal)	2–2	(Netherlands) Ajax	Lisbon, Portugal
20:00 WET (UTC±00:00)	Haller 26' (o.g.); Núñez (yellow card) 46'; Ramos (yellow card) 49'; Yaremchuk 72', (yellow card) 72'	Report	Tadić 18'; Mazraoui (yellow card) 23'; Haller 29'; Berghuis (yellow card) 45'; Antony (yellow card) 87'	Stadium: Estádio da Luz; Attendance: 54,760; Referee: Slavko Vinčić (Slovenia)

15 March 2022 Second leg	Ajax (Netherlands)	0–1 (2–3 agg.)	(Portugal) Benfica	Amsterdam, Netherlands
21:00 CET (UTC+01:00)	Timber (yellow card) 83'; Blind (yellow card) 90+4'; Gravenberch (yellow card) 90+4'	Report	Ramos (yellow card) 67'; Núñez 77'	Stadium: Johan Cruyff Arena; Attendance: 54,066; Referee: Carlos del Cerro Grande (Spain)

===== Quarter-finals =====
The draw for the quarter-finals was held on 18 March 2022.

5 April 2022 First leg	Benfica (Portugal)	1–3	(England) Liverpool	Lisbon, Portugal
20:00 WEST (UTC+01:00)	Núñez 49'; Taarabt (yellow card) 63'	Report	Konaté 17'; Mané 34'; Thiago (yellow card) 58'; Díaz 87'	Stadium: Estádio da Luz; Attendance: 59,633; Referee: Jesús Gil Manzano (Spain)

13 April 2022 Second leg	Liverpool (England)	3–3 (6–4 agg.)	(Portugal) Benfica	Liverpool, England
20:00 BST (UTC+01:00)	Konaté 21'; Firmino 55', 65'	Report	Ramos 32'; Yaremchuk 73'; Núñez 83'	Stadium: Anfield; Attendance: 51,373; Referee: Serdar Gözübüyük (Netherlands)

== Statistics ==
=== Appearances and goals ===
As of 13 May 2022

No.	Pos	Nat	Player	Total		Primeira Liga		Taça de Portugal		Taça da Liga		Champions League	
No.	Pos	Nat	Player	Apps	Goals	Apps	Goals	Apps	Goals	Apps	Goals	Apps	Goals
Goalkeepers
1	GK	(Serbia) SRB	Mile Svilar	0	0	0	0	0	0	0	0	0	0
77	GK	(Brazil) BRA	Helton Leite	7	0	2	0	3	0	2	0	0	0
99	GK	(Greece) GRE	Odysseas Vlachodimos	48	0	32	0	0	0	2	0	14	0
Defenders
2	DF	(Brazil) BRA	Gilberto	35	4	16+5	2	2	0	0	0	9+3	2
3	DF	(Spain) ESP	Álex Grimaldo	48	6	27+2	5	2	1	3	0	14	0
4	DF	(Brazil) BRA	Lucas Veríssimo	18	3	10	3	0	0	1	0	7	0
5	DF	(Belgium) BEL	Jan Vertonghen	46	0	28	0	3	0	2	0	12+1	0
17	DF	(Portugal) POR	Diogo Gonçalves	34	0	10+13	0	0	0	2+1	0	4+4	0
22	DF	(Austria) AUT	Valentino Lazaro	29	0	10+8	0	0+3	0	2	0	1+5	0
30	DF	(Argentina) ARG	Nicolás Otamendi	43	0	28	0	1	0	1	0	13	0
31	DF	(Portugal) POR	Gil Dias	17	1	7+5	1	1	0	0+2	0	0+2	0
34	DF	(Portugal) POR	André Almeida	25	1	9+6	0	3	1	0	0	3+4	0
53	DF	(Portugal) POR	Sandro Cruz	2	0	2	0	0	0	0	0	0	0
72	DF	(Portugal) POR	Tomás Araújo	3	0	1+2	0	0	0	0	0	0	0
91	DF	(Brazil) BRA	Morato	24	1	10+4	0	2	0	3	0	4+1	1
Midfielders
7	MF	(Brazil) BRA	Everton	46	7	20+7	3	2+1	2	3	2	7+6	0
11	MF	(France) FRA	Soualiho Meïté	26	0	10+7	0	1	0	2+1	0	1+4	0
20	MF	(Portugal) POR	João Mário	45	4	20+8	3	1+1	0	2+1	0	10+2	1
23	MF	(Serbia) SRB	Nemanja Radonjić	11	1	1+5	0	1+1	0	1+1	1	0+1	0
27	MF	(Portugal) POR	Rafa Silva	44	19	22+6	15	2	1	0+1	0	12+1	3
28	MF	(Germany) GER	Julian Weigl	48	3	27+2	2	2+1	0	2+1	0	13	1
49	MF	(Morocco) MAR	Adel Taarabt	41	1	9+14	1	2+1	0	1+1	0	5+8	0
55	MF	(Portugal) POR	Paulo Bernardo	23	0	8+9	0	0	0	1	0	0+5	0
76	MF	(Portugal) POR	Martim Neto	1	0	0+1	0	0	0	0	0	0	0
96	MF	(Portugal) POR	Diego Moreira	1	0	0+1	0	0	0	0	0	0	0
Forwards
9	FW	(Uruguay) URU	Darwin Núñez	40	34	24+4	26	2	0	0	2	6+4	6
14	FW	(Switzerland) SUI	Haris Seferovic	14	4	4+6	3	0+2	1	0	0	1+1	0
15	FW	(Ukraine) UKR	Roman Yaremchuk	41	9	13+10	6	0+2	0	2+1	0	8+5	3
18	FW	(Brazil) BRA	Rodrigo Pinho	3	1	1+2	1	0	0	0	0	0	0
39	FW	(Portugal) POR	Henrique Araújo	6	3	1+4	3	0	0	0+1	0	0	0
47	FW	(Portugal) POR	Tiago Gouveia	2	0	1+1	0	0	0	0	0	0	0
88	FW	(Portugal) POR	Gonçalo Ramos	45	8	17+12	7	1+1	0	1+2	0	5+6	1
Players who made an appearance and/or had a squad number but left the team.
10	FW	(Germany) GER	Luca Waldschmidt	2	2	2	2	0	0	0	0	0	0
21	MF	(Portugal) POR	Pizzi	30	2	3+12	1	1+2	0	1+2	1	5+4	0
83	MF	(Portugal) POR	Gedson Fernandes	4	0	0+3	0	1	0	0	0	0	0
95	FW	(Brazil) BRA	Carlos Vinícius	1	0	0+1	0	0	0	0	0	0	0
97	DF	(Portugal) POR	Ferro	2	0	1	0	0+1	0	0	0	0	0
