= 2022–23 Portimonense S.C. season =

Portimonense S.C.
2022–23 season
- President: Rodiney Sampaio
- Manager: Paulo Sérgio
- Stadium: Estádio Municipal de Portimão
- Primeira Liga: 13th
- Taça de Portugal: Third round
- Taça da Liga: Group stage
| Home colours | Away colours | Third colours |

The 2022–23 season is the 109th in the history of Portimonense S.C. and their sixth consecutive season in the top flight. The club will participate in the Primeira Liga, the Taça de Portugal, and the Taça da Liga.

== Players ==
As of 18 September 2022

Note: Flags indicate national team as defined under FIFA eligibility rules; some limited exceptions apply. Players may hold more than one non-FIFA nationality.

| No. | Pos. | Nation | Player |
|---|---|---|---|
| 1 | GK | TUR | Berke Özer |
| 3 | DF | CIV | Zié Ouattara |
| 6 | MF | POR | Henrique Jocú |
| 8 | MF | BRA | Ewerton |
| 10 | FW | KOR | Kim Yong-hak |
| 11 | FW | BRA | Anderson Oliveira |
| 13 | FW | JPN | Shuhei Kawasaki |
| 14 | DF | SEN | Moustapha Seck |
| 17 | FW | POR | Ricardo Matos |
| 18 | DF | MAR | Fahd Moufi |
| 19 | DF | POR | Gonçalo Costa |
| 20 | MF | BRA | Luquinha |
| 21 | MF | POR | Pedro Sá |
| 22 | DF | POR | Filipe Relvas |
| 24 | MF | FRA | Mohamed Diaby |

| No. | Pos. | Nation | Player |
|---|---|---|---|
| 27 | MF | BRA | Gustavo Klismahn |
| 28 | DF | BRA | Pastor |
| 31 | GK | BRA | Mateus |
| 32 | GK | JPN | Kosuke Nakamura |
| 35 | FW | HON | Bryan Róchez |
| 38 | MF | POR | Paulo Estrela |
| 44 | DF | BRA | Pedrão (on loan from Palmeiras) |
| 45 | FW | BRA | João Veras (on loan from Ponte Preta) |
| 70 | FW | POR | Rui Gomes |
| 76 | MF | BRA | Carlinhos |
| 77 | FW | NGR | Adewale Sapara |
| 78 | DF | BRA | Vinícius Guarapuava |
| 85 | MF | POR | Bruno Reis |
| 93 | FW | BRA | Welinton Júnior |
| 99 | FW | BRA | Yago Cariello |

=== Out on loan ===
Note: Flags indicate national team as defined under FIFA eligibility rules; some limited exceptions apply. Players may hold more than one non-FIFA nationality.

| No. | Pos. | Nation | Player |
|---|---|---|---|
| — | DF | BRA | Pedro Casagrande (to Sporting da Covilhã until 30 June 2023) |
| — | DF | POR | Diogo Rodrigues (to Sporting da Covilhã until 30 June 2023) |
| — | MF | BRA | Eduardo (to Sporting da Covilhã until 30 June 2023) |
| — | MF | BRA | Felipe Dini (to Sporting da Covilhã until 30 June 2023) |

| No. | Pos. | Nation | Player |
|---|---|---|---|
| — | MF | BRA | Lucas Fernandes (to Botafogo until 31 December 2022) |
| — | MF | BRA | Rômulo (to Criciúma until 31 December 2022) |
| — | FW | BRA | Iury (to Ceará until 31 December 2022) |

== Pre-season and friendlies ==
Win Draw Loss Fixtures

| 9 July 2022 Friendly | Portimonense (Portugal) | 0–2 | (France) Monaco | Lagos |
| 17:00 WEST (UTC+1) | | | Ben Yedder 43'; Fofana 89' | Stadium: Estádio Municipal Fernando Cabrita |

| 12 July 2022 Friendly | Portimonense (Portugal) | 1–1 | (England) Birmingham City | Ferreiras |
| 19:00 WEST (UTC+1) | Ewerton 10' | | Hogan 33' | Stadium: Estádio da Nora |

| 14 July 2022 Friendly | Portimonense (Portugal) | 0–1 | (Portugal) Porto | Portimão |
| 10:30 WEST (UTC+1) | | Report | Galeno 3' | Stadium: Estádio Municipal de Portimão; Referee: Nuno Alvo |

| 16 July 2022 Friendly | Roma (Italy) | 2–0 | (Portugal) Portimonense | Albufeira |
| 19:00 WEST (UTC+1) | Tripi 27'; Mancini (yellow card) 45+1'; Zaniolo 71'; Abraham (penalty missed) 87' | Report | | Stadium: Estadio Nacional de Albufeira; Attendance: 1,000; Referee: André Narciso |

| 20 July 2022 Friendly | Portimonense (Portugal) | 2–0 | (Portugal) Sporting CP | Lagos |
| 10:30 WEST (UTC+1) | Yago 3'; Welinton Júnior 28' | Report | | Stadium: Estádio Cascade Resort |
Note: Match was played in two 35-minute halves.

| 23 July 2022 Friendly | Portimonense (Portugal) | 2–0 | (Portugal) Braga | Portimão |
| 09:30 WEST (UTC+1) | Sá 25'; Aponzá 41' | Report | | Stadium: Estádio Dois Irmãos; Referee: André Filipe |

| 23 July 2022 Friendly | Portimonense (Portugal) | 0–2 | (Angola) Petro de Luanda | Portimão |
| 18:00 WEST (UTC+1) | | Report | Gilberto 57'; Diógenes João 76' | Stadium: Estádio Dois Irmãos; Referee: Nuno Alvo |

| 26 July 2022 Friendly | Portimonense (Portugal) | 1–0 | (Portugal) Sporting da Covilhã | Portimão |
| 09:30 WEST (UTC+1) | Pedrão 52' (pen.) | Report | | Stadium: Estádio Dois Irmãos |

| 30 July 2022 Friendly | Portimonense (Portugal) | 2–1 | (Portugal) Estrela da Amadora | Portimão |
| 10:00 WEST (UTC+1) | Yago 3'; Welinton Júnior 89' | Report | Papalélé 37' | Stadium: Estádio Dois Irmãos |

| 15 December 2022 Friendly | Portimonense (Portugal) | 1–1 | (Netherlands) Excelsior | Albufeira, Portugal |
| 11:00 CET (UTC+1) | Anderson 85' | | Goudmijn 23' |

== Competitions ==
=== Overall record ===
| Competition | First match | Last match | Starting round | Final position | Record | | | | | | | |
| Competition | First match | Last match | Starting round | Final position | Pld | W | D | L | GF | GA | GD | Win % |
|---|---|---|---|---|---|---|---|---|---|---|---|---|
| Primeira Liga | 7 August 2022 | May 2023 | Matchday 1 | | 19 | 7 | 2 | 10 | 16 | 25 | −9 | 36.84 |
| Taça de Portugal | 16 October 2022 | | Third round | Third round | 1 | 0 | 0 | 1 | 0 | 2 | −2 | 0.00 |
| Taça da Liga | 19 November 2022 | 14 December 2022 | Group stage | Group stage | 3 | 1 | 0 | 2 | 2 | 5 | −3 | 33.33 |
| Total | | | | | 23 | 8 | 2 | 13 | 18 | 32 | −14 | 34.78 |

Last updated: 6 February 2023
Source: Soccerway

=== Primeira Liga ===
==== League table ====
| Pos | Team | Pld | W | D | L | GF | GA | GD | Pts | Qualification or relegation |
|---|---|---|---|---|---|---|---|---|---|---|
| 13 | Gil Vicente | 34 | 10 | 7 | 17 | 32 | 41 | −9 | 37 | |
| 14 | Estoril | 34 | 10 | 5 | 19 | 33 | 49 | −16 | 35 | |
| 15 | Portimonense | 34 | 10 | 4 | 20 | 25 | 48 | −23 | 34 | |
| 16 | Marítimo (R) | 34 | 7 | 5 | 22 | 32 | 63 | −31 | 26 | Qualification for the relegation play-offs |
| 17 | Paços de Ferreira (R) | 34 | 6 | 5 | 23 | 26 | 62 | −36 | 23 | Relegation to Liga Portugal 2 |

Source: Liga Portugal
Rules for classification: 1) Points; 2) Head-to-head points; 3) Head-to-head goal difference; 4) Goal difference; 5) Matches won; 6) Goals scored; 7) Play-off.
(R) Relegated

==== Results summary ====
| Overall | | | | | | | | Home | | | | | | Away | | | | | |
| Pld | W | D | L | GF | GA | GD | Pts | W | D | L | GF | GA | GD | W | D | L | GF | GA | GD |
|---|---|---|---|---|---|---|---|---|---|---|---|---|---|---|---|---|---|---|---|
| 34 | 10 | 4 | 20 | 25 | 48 | −23 | 34 | 6 | 3 | 8 | 14 | 21 | −7 | 4 | 1 | 12 | 11 | 27 | −16 |

Last updated: 27 May 2023.
Source: Liga Portugal

==== Results by round ====
| Round | 1 | 2 | 3 | 4 | 5 | 6 | 7 | 8 | 9 | 10 | 11 | 12 | 13 | 14 | 15 | 16 | 17 | 18 | 19 | 20 | 21 | 22 | 23 | 24 | 25 | 26 | 27 | 28 | 29 | 30 | 31 | 32 | 33 | 34 |
|---|---|---|---|---|---|---|---|---|---|---|---|---|---|---|---|---|---|---|---|---|---|---|---|---|---|---|---|---|---|---|---|---|---|---|
| Ground | H | A | H | A | H | A | H | A | H | A | H | A | H | H | A | H | A | A | H | A | H | A | H | A | H | A | H | A | H | A | A | H | A | H |
| Result | L | W | W | W | W | L | W | L | L | L | D | W | L | L | L | D | L | L | W | L | W | L | L | L | L | L | D | W | W | L | D | L | L | L |
| Position | 13 | 8 | 5 | 4 | 4 | 5 | 5 | 6 | 8 | 10 | 9 | 7 | 7 | 9 | 11 | 12 | 13 | 14 | 11 | 12 | 10 | 14 | 14 | 14 | 14 | 14 | 14 | 14 | 13 | 13 | 13 | 15 | 15 | 15 |

Updated to match(es) played on 27 May 2023. Source: Liga Portugal
A = Away; H = Home; W = Win; D = Draw; L = Loss

==== Matches ====
The league fixtures were announced on 5 July 2022.

| 7 August 2022 1 | Portimonense | 0–1 | Boavista | Portimão |
| 20:30 CEST (UTC+2) | | Report | Njie 9' | Stadium: Estádio Municipal de Portimão; Attendance: 2,590; Referee: Claúdio Pereira |

| 15 August 2022 2 | Paços de Ferreira | 0–3 | Portimonense | Paços de Ferreira |
| 20:30 CEST (UTC+2) | | Report | Cariello 32'; Luquinha 80'; Ewerton 84' | Stadium: Estádio da Mata Real; Attendance: 2,661; Referee: João Pinheiro |

| 21 August 2022 3 | Portimonense | 2–1 | Vitória SC | Portimão |
| 20:30 CEST (UTC+2) | Welinton Jr. 62'; Cariello 88' | Report | Jota 46' | Stadium: Estádio Municipal de Portimão; Attendance: 3,032; Referee: Ricardo Baixinho |

| 27 August 2022 4 | Marítimo | 0–1 | Portimonense | Funchal |
| 15:30 CEST (UTC+2) | | Report | Welinton Jr. 43' | Stadium: Estádio do Marítimo; Attendance: 4,785; Referee: Manuel Mota |

| 4 September 2022 5 | Portimonense | 1–0 | Famalicão | Portimão |
| 20:30 CEST (UTC+2) | Pedrão 65' | Report | | Stadium: Estádio Municipal de Portimão; Attendance: 1,840; Referee: Artur Soares Dias |

| 10 September 2022 6 | Sporting | 4–0 | Portimonense | Lisbon |
| 18:00 CEST (UTC+2) | Trincão 7', 41'; Pedro Gonçalves 72'; Nuno Santos 76' | Report | | Stadium: Estádio José Alvalade; Attendance: 29,782; Referee: Claudio Pereira |

| 16 September 2022 7 | Portimonense | 1–0 | Chaves | Portimão |
| 20:15 CEST (UTC+2) | Paulo Estrela 19' | Report | | Stadium: Estádio Municipal de Portimão; Attendance: 1,411; Referee: Manuel Oliveira |

| 1 October 2022 8 | Vizela | 1–0 | Portimonense | Vizela |
| 15:30 CEST (UTC+2) | Anderson 14' | Report | | Stadium: Estádio do Futebol Clube de Vizela; Attendance: 2,435; Referee: António Nobre |

| 8 October 2022 9 | Portimonense | 0–2 | Porto | Portimão |
| 18:00 WEST (UTC+01:00) | | Report | Otávio 22'; Pepê 52' | Stadium: Estádio Municipal de Portimão; Attendance: 3,969; Referee: Manuel Mota |

| 24 October 2022 10 | Rio Ave | 1–0 | Portimonense | Vila do Conde |
| 15:15 WEST (UTC+01:00) | Boateng 45+2' | Report | | Stadium: Estádio dos Arcos; Attendance: 1,693; Referee: Bruno José Costa |

| 30 October 2022 11 | Portimonense | 1–1 | Estoril | Portimão |
| 15:30 WEST (UTC+01:00) | Welinton Jr 88' (pen.) | Report | Erison 23' | Stadium: Estádio Municipal de Portimão; Attendance: 1,304; Referee: Gustavo Correia |

=== Taça de Portugal ===
| 16 October 2022 Third round | Vilaverdense | 2–0 | Portimonense | Vila Verde |
| 15:00 CEST (UTC+2) | Soares 30'; Filho 90' | Report | | Stadium: Campo Cruz do Reguengo; Referee: Vitor Ferreira |
