= List of Portuguese football transfers winter 2021–22 =

This is a list of Portuguese football transfers for the 2021–22 winter transfer window. The winter transfer window will open 1 January 2022, although a few transfers may take place prior to that date. The window closes at midnight on 1 February 2022 although outgoing transfers might still happen to leagues in which the window is still open. Only moves involving Primeira Liga clubs are listed. Additionally, players without a club may join a club at any time.

== Transfers ==
Date	Name	Moving from	Moving to	Fee
27 December 2021	(Brazil) Eduardo Teixeira	Braga	(Brazil) Náutico	Loan
3 January 2022	(Brazil) Anderson	(Brazil) América Mineiro	Vizela	Undisclosed
6 January 2022	(Argentina) Germán Conti	Benfica	(Brazil) América Mineiro	Loan
8 January 2022	(Morocco) Mohamed Bouldini	Santa Clara	(Spain) Fuenlabrada	Loan
9 January 2022	(Venezuela) Jhon Murillo	Tondela	(Mexico) Atlético San Luis	Undisclosed
10 January 2022	(Colombia) Oscar Barreto	(Colombia) Millonarios	Santa Clara	Undisclosed
10 January 2022	(Guinea-Bissau) Nanu	Porto	(United States) FC Dallas	Loan
10 January 2022	(Portugal) David Simão	(Greece) AEK Athens	Arouca	Undisclosed
12 January 2022	(Portugal) Abdu Conté	Moreirense	(France) Troyes	Undisclosed
12 January 2022	(Portugal) Sérgio Oliveira	Porto	(Italy) Roma	Loan
14 January 2022	(Mexico) Jesús Corona	Porto	(Spain) Sevilla	Undisclosed
14 January 2022	(France) Denis-Will Poha	Vitória de Guimarães	(France) Pau	Loan
15 January 2022	(Nigeria) Mikel Agu	Vitória de Guimarães	(Spain) Fuenlabrada	Undisclosed
15 January 2022	(Spain) Javier Avilés	(Spain) Leganés	Tondela	Loan
17 January 2022	(Portugal) Chiquinho	Estoril Praia	(England) Wolverhampton Wanderers	£3m
18 January 2022	(Colombia) Andrés Sarmiento	(Colombia) Atlético Bucaramanga	Vizela	Undisclosed
18 January 2022	(Japan) Kyosuke Tagawa	(Japan) Tokyo	Santa Clara	Loan
19 January 2022	(Brazil) João Veras	(Brazil) Ponte Preta	Portimonense	Loan
20 January 2022	(Portugal) Aylton Boa Morte	Portimonense	(United Arab Emirates) Khor Fakkan	Undisclosed
24 January 2022	(Canada) Stephen Eustáquio	Paços de Ferreira	Porto	Loan
24 January 2022	(Belgium) Kevin Mirallas	(Turkey) Gaziantep	Moreirense	Free
24 January 2022	(Portugal) Filipe Soares	Moreirense	(Greece) PAOK	Undisclosed
25 January 2022	(Brazil) Bruno Marques	(Brazil) Santos	Arouca	Loan
26 January 2022	(Guinea-Bissau) Fali Candé	Portimonense	(France) Metz	Undisclosed
26 January 2022	(France) Hamidou Keyta	Santa Clara	(Azerbaijan) Zira	Undisclosed
26 January 2022	(Mexico) Eugenio Pizzuto	(France) Lille	Braga	Free
26 January 2022	(Portugal) Tomás Ribeiro	Belenenses SAD	(Switzerland) Grasshopper	Undisclosed
27 January 2022	(Brazil) Jefferson Jr.	(Turkey) Gaziantep	Moreirense	Free
27 January 2022	(Brazil) Luiz Phellype	Sporting CP	(Greece) OFI Crete	Loan
28 January 2022	(France) Noa Cervantes	(France) Stade de Reims	Paços de Ferreira	Loan
28 January 2022	(Croatia) Nino Galović	(Croatia) Rijeka	Arouca	Undisclosed
28 January 2022	(Ivory Coast) N'Dri Philippe Koffi	(France) Stade de Reims	Paços de Ferreira	Loan
28 January 2022	(Brazil) Wellington Nem	(Brazil) Cruzeiro	Arouca	Free
28 January 2022	(Brazil) Guilherme Souza	(Brazil) Bahia	Gil Vicente	Undisclosed
30 January 2022	(Portugal) André André	Vitória de Guimarães	(Saudi Arabia) Al-Ittihad	Loan
30 January 2022	(Spain) Adrián Butzke	(Spain) Granada	Paços de Ferreira	Loan
30 January 2022	(Colombia) Luis Diáz	Porto	(England) Liverpool	£37.5m
30 January 2022	(Argentina) Alan Ruiz	(Argentina) Arsenal de Sarandí	Arouca	Undisclosed
30 January 2022	(Portugal) Tiago Tomás	Sporting CP	(Germany) VfB Stuttgart	Loan
31 January 2022	(Brazil) Marcelo Alves	(Brazil) Madureira	Tondela	Loan
31 January 2022	(Cape Verde) Jovane Cabral	Sporting CP	(Italy) Lazio	Loan
31 January 2022	(Venezuela) Jhonder Cádiz	Benfica	Famalicão	Undisclosed
31 January 2022	(Portugal) Filipe Cardoso	Marítimo	Académico de Viseu	Loan
31 January 2022	(Brazil) Tiago Coser	(Brazil) Chapecoense	Benfica	Undisclosed
31 January 2022	(Benin) Sessi D'Almeida	(France) Valenciennes	Tondela	Loan
31 January 2022	(Portugal) Ferro	Benfica	(Croatia) Hajduk Split	Loan
31 January 2022	(Portugal) Rúben Fonseca	Tondela	Braga	Loan
31 January 2022	(Argentina) Nicolás Gaitán	(Uruguay) Peñarol	Paços de Ferreira	Free
31 January 2022	(Brazil) Galeno	Braga	Porto	Undisclosed
31 January 2022	(Portugal) Pedro Ganchas	Benfica	Paços de Ferreira	Undisclosed
31 January 2022	(Colombia) Pipe Gómez	(Colombia) Leones	Santa Clara	Loan
31 January 2022	(Spain) Mario González	Braga	(Spain) Tenerife	Loan
31 January 2022	(Venezuela) Matías Lacava	(Venezuela) Academia Puerto Cabello	Tondela	Loan
31 January 2022	(Portugal) Ricardo Matos	Olhanense	Portimonense	Undisclosed
31 January 2022	(Spain) Jordi Mboula	(Spain) Mallorca	Estoril Praia	Loan
31 January 2022	(Argentina) Cristian Parano	Paços de Ferreira	(Greece) Chania	Loan
31 January 2022	(Brazil) Patrick	(Brazil) Grêmio	Santa Clara	Undisclosed
31 January 2022	(Mali) Falaye Sacko	Vitória de Guimarães	(France) Saint-Étienne	Loan
31 January 2022	(Nigeria) Adewale Sapara	Leixões	Portimonense	Undisclosed
31 January 2022	(Portugal) Rúben Semedo	(Greece) Olympiacos	Porto	Loan
31 January 2022	(Brazil) Raul Silva	Braga	Estoril Praia	Loan
31 January 2022	(China) Guo Tianyu	(China) Shandong Taishan	Vizela	Loan
1 February 2022	(France) Julien Dacosta	(England) Coventry City	Portimonense	Loan
1 February 2022	(England) Marcus Edwards	Vitória de Guimarães	Sporting CP	€7.67m
1 February 2022	(Angola) Bruno Gaspar	Sporting CP	Vitória de Guimarães	Undisclosed
1 February 2022	(Portugal) João Carlos Teixeira	(Netherlands) Feyenoord	Famalicão	Undisclosed
2 February 2022	(Mozambique) Geny Catamo	Sporting CP	Vitória de Guimarães	Loan
2 February 2022	(Algeria) Islam Slimani	(France) Lyon	Sporting CP	Undisclosed
3 February 2022	(Portugal) Gedson Fernandes	Benfica	(Turkey) Çaykur Rizespor	Loan
5 February 2022	(Portugal) Ricardo	Portimonense	(Slovakia) DAC 1904	Undisclosed
6 February 2022	(Colombia) Yony González	Benfica	(Colombia) Deportivo Cali	Loan
7 February 2022	(Portugal) Chiquinho	Benfica	(Turkey) Giresunspor	Loan
8 February 2022	(Portugal) João Pedro	Paços de Ferreira	(Turkey) Bursaspor	Undisclosed
8 February 2022	(Portugal) Pizzi	Benfica	(Turkey) İstanbul Başakşehir	Loan
9 February 2022	(Brazil) Bruno Viana	Braga	(Russia) Khimki	Loan
10 February 2022	(Portugal) Licá	Farense	Belenenses SAD	Free
12 February 2022	(Angola) Felício Milson	Marítimo	(Russia) Nizhny Novgorod	Undisclosed
12 February 2022	(Brazil) Felipe Pires	Moreirense	(Ukraine) Dnipro-1	Undisclosed
1 July 2022	(Portugal) Gedson Fernandes	Benfica	(Turkey) Beşiktaş	Undisclosed
