= Pedro Sá =

Portuguese footballer (born 1993)

Personal information
- Full name: Pedro Miguel da Cunha e Sá
- Date of birth: 1 December 1993 (age 32)
- Place of birth: Póvoa de Varzim, Portugal
- Height: 1.75 m (5 ft 9 in)
- Position: Defensive midfielder

Team information
- Current team: Penafiel
- Number: 21

Youth career
- 2003–2012: Varzim

Senior career*
Years	Team	Apps	(Gls)
2012–2016	Varzim	111	(5)
2014–2015	Varzim B	2	(0)
2016–2023	Portimonense	172	(2)
2023–2024	Estrela Amadora	18	(0)
2024–2025	Sfaxien	8	(1)
2025	Vyškov	14	(1)
2025–	Penafiel	27	(0)
- * Club domestic league appearances and goals as of 20 June 2026

Pedro Miguel da Cunha e Sá (born 1 December 1993) is a Portuguese professional footballer who plays as a defensive midfielder for Liga Portugal 2 club Penafiel.

== Club career ==
Born in Póvoa de Varzim, Sá joined hometown club Varzim SC's youth ranks at the age of 9. He made his senior debut with eight games in the third division in 2012–13, and played regularly in the next three seasons, the last of which in Segunda Liga; he also appeared in two matches for their reserves in the Porto Football Association's first district league.

Ahead of the 2016–17 campaign, Sá signed with Portimonense S.C. of the same league; in July 2018, a court in Póvoa de Varzim ordered his previous club to pay some of the transfer fee to his agents, Foot Emotions. The team from the Algarve won promotion in his first year, as champions.

Sá made his Primeira Liga debut on 7 August 2017, playing the entire 2–1 home win against Boavista FC. He added a further 27 appearances during the season, scoring in a 3–3 draw at Vitória S.C. on 23 October.

In January 2019, Sá signed a new contract lasting until 2023, with a buyout clause of €30 million. He injured his elbow in December of the following year, requiring surgery; in one of his first games back, on 20 March 2021, he was sent off at the end of a 2–1 home loss to FC Porto. That 6 November, he scored his first league goal for over four years, concluding a 2–0 victory over B-SAD also at the Estádio Municipal de Portimão.

On 30 June 2023, Sá agreed to a two-year deal at recently-promoted C.F. Estrela da Amadora as a free agent. The 30-year-old moved abroad for the first time in July 2024, joining Tunisian Ligue Professionnelle 1 side CS Sfaxien until June 2026. He concluded the season in the Czech National Football League with MFK Vyškov, with whom he reached the promotion play-offs after scoring in the last round, a 2–0 win over 1. SK Prostějov.

Sá returned to Portugal on 5 August 2025, on a one-year contract with second-tier F.C. Penafiel.

== Career statistics ==
As of match played 18 May 2024

Appearances and goals by club, season and competition
Club	Season	League			National cup		League cup		Total	
Club	Season	Division	Apps	Goals	Apps	Goals	Apps	Goals	Apps	Goals
Varzim	2012–13	Segunda Divisão	8	0	0	0	0	0	8	0
Varzim	2013–14	Campeonato Nacional	31	2	0	0	0	0	31	2
Varzim	2014–15	Campeonato Nacional	32	0	1	0	0	0	33	0
Varzim	2015–16	LigaPro	40	3	0	0	2	0	42	3
Varzim	Total		111	5	1	0	2	0	114	5
Portimonense	2016–17	LigaPro	38	0	0	0	1	0	39	0
Portimonense	2017–18	Primeira Liga	28	1	1	1	4	0	33	2
Portimonense	2018–19	Primeira Liga	32	0	0	0	1	0	33	0
Portimonense	2019–20	Primeira Liga	25	0	0	0	3	0	28	0
Portimonense	2020–21	Primeira Liga	16	0	0	0	0	0	16	0
Portimonense	2021–22	Primeira Liga	20	1	4	0	2	0	26	1
Portimonense	2022–23	Primeira Liga	13	0	0	0	0	0	13	0
Portimonense	Total		172	2	5	1	11	0	188	3
Estrela Amadora	2023–24	Primeira Liga	18	0	0	0	0	0	18	0
Career totals			301	7	6	1	13	0	320	8
