= Sana Gomes =

Sana Gomes may refer to:

- Saná Gomes (footballer, born 1999), Bissau-Guinean football left-back for Noah
- Sana Gomes (footballer, born 2002), Bissau-Guinean football left-back for Portimonense
