= Abraham Marcus =

Nigerian footballer (born 2000)

Personal information
- Full name: Abraham Ayomide Marcus
- Date of birth: 2 January 2000 (age 26)
- Place of birth: Lagos, Nigeria
- Height: 1.78 m (5 ft 10 in)
- Position: Winger

Team information
- Current team: Estrela da Amadora
- Number: 99

Youth career
- Remo Stars
- 2018–2020: → Feirense (loan)

Senior career*
Years	Team	Apps	(Gls)
2020–2023	Remo Stars	0	(0)
2020–2021	→ Feirense (loan)	26	(11)
2021–2022	→ Portimonense (loan)	3	(0)
2022	→ Radomiak Radom (loan)	8	(0)
2022–2023	→ Porto B (loan)	30	(9)
2023	→ Porto (loan)	1	(0)
2023–2025	Porto B	55	(10)
2025–	Estrela da Amadora	31	(5)

International career
2021	Nigeria	2	(0)
- * Club domestic league appearances and goals as of 25 May 2026

Abraham Ayomide Marcus (born 2 January 2000) is a Nigerian professional footballer who plays as a forward for Primeira Liga club Estrela da Amadora.

== Club career ==
On 30 August 2021, he joined Portimonense in Portugal's top-tier Primeira Liga on a season-long loan with an option to buy.

On 10 February 2022, he moved on loan until June 2022 with an option to buy from Portimonense to Polish Ekstraklasa side Radomiak Radom.

On 26 May 2022, Marcus moved on a season-long loan with an option-to-buy to Porto B.

In July 2023, Marcus signed permanently for Porto B, after the club triggered the option-to-buy, reported to be around €750.000.

== International career ==
On 14 May 2021, the Super Eagles head coach Gernot Rohr included Marcus in his 31-man list for June friendlies. He made his senior international debut in a 1–0 loss to Cameroon on 4 June 2021.

== Career statistics ==
=== Club ===
As of match played 27 August 2025

Appearances and goals by club, season and competition
Club	Season	League			National cup (Note: Includes Taça de Portugal)		League cup		Total	
Club	Season	Division	Apps	Goals	Apps	Goals	Apps	Goals	Apps	Goals
Remo Stars	—	—			—		—		—	
Feirense (loan)	2020–21	Liga Portugal 2	26	11	2	0	—		28	11
Portimonense (loan)	2021–22	Primeira Liga	3	0	1	0	0	0	4	0
Radomiak Radom (loan)	2021–22	Ekstraklasa	8	0	0	0	—		8	0
Porto (loan)	2022–23	Primeira Liga	0	0	1	0	0	0	1	0
Porto B (loan)	2022–23	Liga Portugal 2	30	9	—		—		30	9
Porto B	2023–24	Liga Portugal 2	32	7	—		—		32	7
Porto B	2024–25	Liga Portugal 2	23	3	—		—		23	3
Porto B	Total		85	19	0	0	0	0	85	19
Estrela da Amadora	2025–26	Primeira Liga	4	0	0	0	0	0	4	0
Career total			126	30	4	0	0	0	130	30

== Honours ==
Individual

- Liga Portugal 2 Goal of the Month: August 2022
