= Ricardo Ferreira (footballer, born 1989) =

Portuguese footballer

Ricardo
Personal information
- Full name: Ricardo Abel Barbosa Ferreira
- Date of birth: 3 December 1989 (age 36)
- Place of birth: Braga, Portugal
- Height: 1.86 m (6 ft 1 in)
- Position: Goalkeeper

Youth career
- 2001–2008: Braga

Senior career*
Years	Team	Apps	(Gls)
2008–2009	Braga	0	(0)
2008–2009	→ Olhanense (loan)	1	(0)
2009–2010	Olhanense	1	(0)
2010–2012	Marítimo B	62	(0)
2012–2014	Marítimo	8	(0)
2013–2014	→ Portimonense (loan)	9	(0)
2014–2021	Portimonense	217	(0)
2022–2023	Dunajská Streda	6	(0)
Total		304	(0)

International career
2007	Portugal U18	2	(0)
2009	Portugal U21	1	(0)
- * Club domestic league appearances and goals

Ricardo Abel Barbosa Ferreira (born 3 December 1989), known simply as Ricardo, is a Portuguese former professional footballer who plays as a goalkeeper.

== Club career ==
Ricardo was born in Braga. A product of hometown S.C. Braga's youth system, he was promoted to the first team for the 2007–08 season as fourth goalkeeper.

In the following two years, Ricardo played for S.C. Olhanense in Algarve, the first on loan, appearing in only two matches. In the 2009–10 campaign, with the club in the Primeira Liga for the first time in 34 years, he started in the last matchday as the side were already safe from relegation, featuring in the 2–2 away draw against F.C. Paços de Ferreira.

Ricardo signed with C.S. Marítimo in the summer of 2010, being mainly associated with the reserves during his spell in Madeira. Four years later, after a season-long loan at the club, he joined Portimonense S.C. from the Segunda Liga on a three-year contract. He contributed 40 games in 2016–17, helping to a top-division return after six years, and was rewarded with a three-year extension.

From 2020, Ricardo lost his starting place to first Shūichi Gonda and later Samuel Portugal. The 32-year-old moved abroad for the first time in his career in February 2022, joining FC DAC 1904 Dunajská Streda of the Slovak Super Liga on a one-and-a-half-year deal.

== International career ==
Ricardo won his only cap for the Portugal under-21s on 16 July 2009, in a 7–1 rout of India in that year's Lusofonia Games.
