= Samuel Portugal =

Brazilian footballer

Personal information
- Full name: Samuel Portugal Lima
- Date of birth: 29 March 1994 (age 32)
- Place of birth: Teixeira de Freitas, Brazil
- Height: 1.88 m (6 ft 2 in)
- Position: Goalkeeper

Team information
- Current team: Gil Vicente
- Number: 90

Youth career
- 2012–2014: Coritiba

Senior career*
Years	Team	Apps	(Gls)
2015–2019	Coritiba	0	(0)
2016	→ Metropolitano (loan)	12	(0)
2016	→ Portuguesa (loan)	0	(0)
2017	→ Água Santa (loan)	0	(0)
2018	→ Grêmio Anápolis (loan)	12	(0)
2020–2022	Portimonense	64	(0)
2022–2026	Porto	0	(0)
2024–2025	Porto B	10	(0)
2025–2026	→ Al-Okhdood (loan)	27	(0)
2026–	Gil Vicente	0	(0)
- * Club domestic league appearances and goals as of 30 April 2026

Samuel Portugal Lima (born 29 March 1994) is a Brazilian professional footballer who plays as a goalkeeper for Gil Vicente.

== Professional career ==
On 4 January 2020, Samuel signed with Portimonense from Coritiba. Samuel made his professional debut with Portimonense in a 1–1 Primeira Liga tie with Paços de Ferreira on 21 September 2020, saving a penalty on his debut.

On 1 September 2022, Portugal signed a five-year contract with fellow Primeira Liga side FC Porto, for a reported fee of €4 million.

== Career statistics ==
As of match played 17 May 2025

Appearances and goals by club, season and competition
Club	Season	League			State league		National cup		League cup (Note: Includes Taça da Liga)		Continental		Other		Total	
Club	Season	Division	Apps	Goals	Apps	Goals	Apps	Goals	Apps	Goals	Apps	Goals	Apps	Goals	Apps	Goals
Coritiba	2015	Série A	0	0	0	0	0	0	—		—		—		0	0
Coritiba	2018	Série B	0	0	0	0	0	0	—		—		—		0	0
Coritiba	Total		0	0	0	0	0	0	—		—		—		0	0
Metropolitano (loan)	2016	Série D	0	0	12 (Note: Appearances in Campeonato Catarinense)	0	—		—		—		—		12	0
Portuguesa (loan)	2016	Série C	0	0	0	0	0	0	—		—		—		0	0
Água Santa (loan)	2017	—			0	0	—		—		—		3 (Note: Appearances in Copa Paulista)	0	3	0
Grêmio Anápolis (loan)	2018	—			12 (Note: Appearances in Campeonato Goiano)	0	—		—		—		—		12	0
Portimonense	2019–20	Primeira Liga	0	0	—		0	0	0	0	—		—		0	0
Portimonense	2020–21	Primeira Liga	30	0	—		0	0	—		—		—		30	0
Portimonense	2021–22	Primeira Liga	30	0	—		0	0	1	0	—		—		31	0
Portimonense	2022–23	Primeira Liga	4	0	—		0	0	0	0	—		—		4	0
Portimonense	Total		64	0	—		0	0	1	0	—		—		65	0
Porto	2022–23	Primeira Liga	0	0	—		0	0	0	0	0	0	0	0	0	0
Porto	2023–24	Primeira Liga	0	0	—		0	0	0	0	0	0	0	0	0	0
Porto	Total		0	0	—		0	0	0	0	0	0	0	0	0	0
Porto B	2024–25	Liga Portugal 2	10	0	—		0	0	0	0	0	0	0	0	10	0
Al-Okhdood (loan)	2025–26	Saudi Pro League	25	0	—		0	0	—		—		—		25	0
Career total			99	0	24	0	0	0	1	0	0	0	3	0	127	0
