= Pedro Casagrande =

Brazilian footballer

Casagrande
Personal information
- Full name: Pedro Henrique Casagrande Oliveira
- Date of birth: 12 May 1999 (age 27)
- Place of birth: Londrina, Brazil
- Height: 1.86 m (6 ft 1 in)
- Position: Defender

Team information
- Current team: Lahti
- Number: 5

Youth career
- 2016–2019: Londrina

Senior career*
Years	Team	Apps	(Gls)
2020–2024	Portimonense	1	(0)
2022–2024	→ Covilhã (loan)	42	(3)
2024–2025	Anadia	10	(0)
2025–	Lahti	24	(1)
- * Club domestic league appearances and goals as of 23 November 2025

Pedro Henrique Casagrande Oliveira (born 12 May 1999), known as simply Casagrande, is a Brazilian professional footballer who plays as a defender for Finnish club Lahti.

== Professional career ==
A youth product of Londrina, Casagrande moved to Portugal with Portimonense in 2019 and was originally a part of their U23 side. Casagrande made his professional debut with Portimonense in a 5–1 Primeira Liga win over C.D. Nacional on 2 April 2021.
