= Renato Júnior =

Brazilian footballer (born 2002)

Personal information
- Full name: Renato Barbosa dos Santos Júnior
- Date of birth: June 5, 2002 (age 24)
- Place of birth: São Paulo, Brazil
- Height: 1.90 m (6 ft 3 in)
- Position: Striker

Team information
- Current team: Al Wasl
- Number: 96

Youth career
- Água Santa

Senior career*
Years	Team	Apps	(Gls)
2021–2023	Água Santa	21	(5)
2021–2022	→ Portimonense (loan)	12	(0)
2022	→ Goiás (loan)	17	(0)
2023–2025	Viborg	62	(5)
2025–	Al Wasl	19	(2)
- * Club domestic league appearances and goals as of 00:53, 2 August 2026 (UTC)

Renato Barbosa dos Santos Júnior (born 5 June 2002), better known as just Renato Júnior, is a Brazilian professional footballer who plays as a striker for UAE Pro League side Al Wasl.

== Professional career ==
Renato Júnior began his career with the Brazilian side, Agua Santa SP before joining the Primeira Liga side Portimonense on 18 June 2021 for the 2021-22 season. He made his professional debut with Portimonense in a 2-1 Taça da Liga loss to Académica on 23 July 2021.

On 31 January 2023, Júnior joined Danish Superliga side Viborg on a deal until June 2026. His debut for the club came on 12 March, coming into the match in the 60th minute as a substitute for Ibrahim Said in a 1–1 draw against Nordsjælland.

After two-and-a-half seasons in Denmark, Júnior joined UAE Pro League side Al Wasl on 8 July 2025.
