= Carlinhos (footballer, born June 1994) =

Brazilian footballer

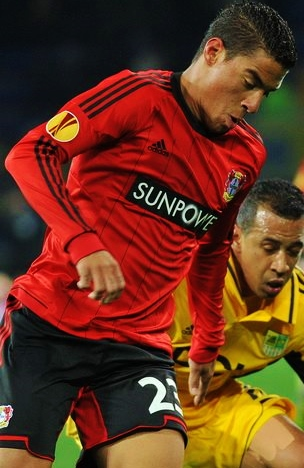
- Carlinhos playing for Bayer Leverkusen in 2012

Personal information
- Full name: Carlos Vinícius Santos de Jesus
- Date of birth: 22 June 1994 (age 32)
- Place of birth: Camacan, Bahia, Brazil
- Height: 1.80 m (5 ft 11 in)
- Position: Midfielder

Youth career
- Desportivo Brasil

Senior career*
Years	Team	Apps	(Gls)
2012–2013	Desportivo Brasil	0	(0)
2012–2013	→ Bayer Leverkusen (loan)	0	(0)
2013	→ Jahn Regensburg (loan)	13	(2)
2013–2015	Internacional	0	(0)
2015–2017	Monte Azul	0	(0)
2015	→ Red Bull Brasil (loan)	5	(0)
2015–2016	→ FC Aarau (loan)	33	(10)
2016	→ FC Thun (loan)	7	(0)
2017	Estoril	12	(3)
2017–2020	Standard Liège	30	(1)
2019	→ Guarani (loan)	6	(0)
2019–2020	→ Vitória de Setúbal (loan)	30	(4)
2020–2021	Vasco da Gama	36	(2)
2021–2026	Portimonense	72	(13)
2024–2025	→ Qatar (loan)	21	(4)
2025–2026	→ Dibba (loan)	23	(6)
2026	Kuwait	0	(0)
- * Club domestic league appearances and goals as of 31 August 2026

Carlos Vinícius Santos de Jesus (born 22 June 1994) is a Brazilian professional footballer who plays as an attacking or central midfielder for Kuwait.

== Club career ==
In July 2015, he joined Aarau on loan for one year. At the end of the loan period in June 2016, Aarau wanted to extend the deal by another year but the owning club Atlético Monte Azul instead reached an agreement with Thun for one-year loan deal.

On 16 July 2021, he joined Portimonense in Portugal on a two-year contract.

== Career statistics ==
As of match played 30 September 2023

Appearances and goals by club, season and competition
Club	Season	League			State league		National cup		League cup		Continental		Total	
Club	Season	Division	Apps	Goals	Apps	Goals	Apps	Goals	Apps	Goals	Apps	Goals	Apps	Goals
Desportivo Brasil	2012	—			0	0	—		—		—		0	0
Bayer Leverkusen (loan)	2012–13	Bundesliga	0	0	—		0	0	—		3 (Note: Appearance(s) in UEFA Europa League)	0	3	0
Jahn Regensburg (loan)	2012–13	2. Bundesliga	13	2	—		0	0	—		—		13	2
Internacional	2013	Série A	0	0	0	0	0	0	—		—		0	0
Internacional	2014	Série A	0	0	0	0	0	0	—		0	0	0	0
Internacional	Total		0	0	0	0	0	0	—		0	0	0	0
Monte Azul	2015	—			0	0	—		—		—		0	0
Red Bull Brasil (loan)	2015	Série D	0	0	5 (Note: Appearance(s) in Campeonato Paulista)	0	—		—		—		5	0
Aarau (loan)	2015–16	Swiss Challenge League	33	10	—		4	0	—		—		37	10
Thun (loan)	2016–17	Swiss Super League	7	0	—		1	0	—		—		8	0
Estoril	2016–17	Primeira Liga	11	3	—		1	1	0	0	—		12	4
Estoril	2017–18	Primeira Liga	1	0	—		0	0	0	0	—		1	0
Estoril	Total		12	3	—		1	1	0	0	—		13	4
Standard Liège	2017–18	Belgian First Division A	28	1	—		4	2	—		—		32	3
Standard Liège	2018–19	Belgian First Division A	2	0	—		1	0	—		0	0	3	0
Standard Liège	Total		30	1	—		5	2	—		0	0	35	3
Guarani (loan)	2019	Série B	0	0	6	0	0	0	—		—		6	0
Vitória FC (loan)	2019–20	Primeira Liga	30	4	—		2	1	4	0	—		36	5
Vasco da Gama	2020	Série A	28	1	0	0	2	0	—		4 (Note: Appearance(s) in Copa Sudamericana)	0	34	1
Vasco da Gama	2021	Série B	0	0	8 (Note: Appearance(s) in Campeonato Carioca)	1	0	0	—		—		8	1
Vasco da Gama	Total		28	1	8	1	2	0	—		4	0	42	2
Portimonense	2021–22	Primeira Liga	31	3	—		4	0	2	0	—		37	3
Portimonense	2022–23	Primeira Liga	9	0	—		0	0	0	0	—		9	0
Portimonense	2023–24	Primeira Liga	7	4	—		0	0	2	1	—		9	5
Portimonense	Total		47	7	—		4	0	4	1	—		55	8
Career total			200	28	19	1	19	4	8	1	7	0	253	34

== Honours ==
Standard Liège

- Belgian Cup: 2017–18
