= Gedson Fernandes =

Portuguese footballer (born 1999)

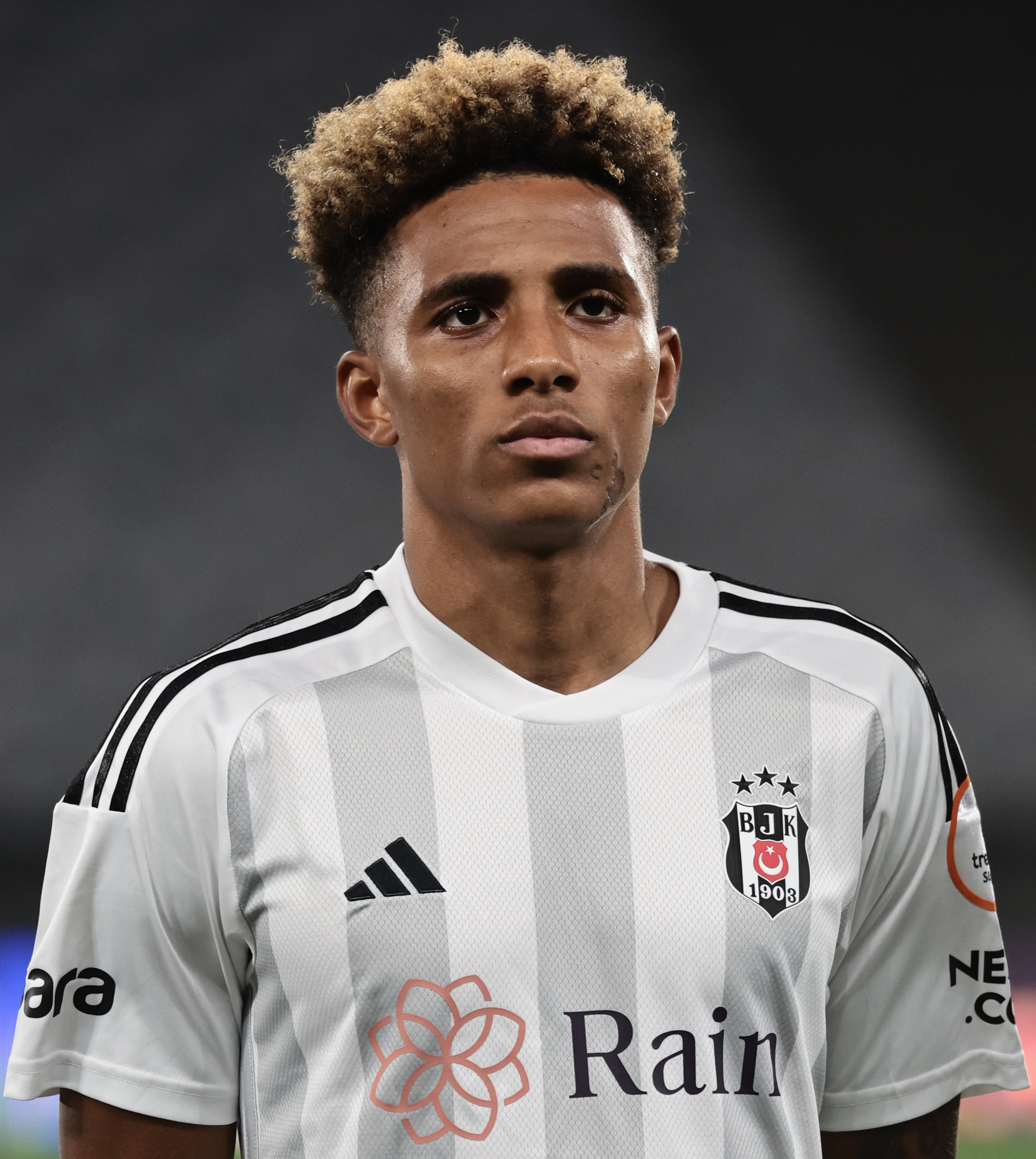
- Fernandes with Beşiktaş in 2023

Personal information
- Full name: Gedson Carvalho Fernandes
- Date of birth: 9 January 1999 (age 27)
- Place of birth: São Tomé, São Tomé and Príncipe
- Height: 1.83 m (6 ft 0 in)
- Position: Midfielder

Team information
- Current team: Spartak Moscow
- Number: 83

Youth career
- 2008–2009: SC Frielas
- 2009–2018: Benfica

Senior career*
Years	Team	Apps	(Gls)
2017–2018	Benfica B	40	(5)
2018–2022	Benfica	32	(0)
2020–2021	→ Tottenham Hotspur (loan)	7	(0)
2021	→ Galatasaray (loan)	17	(0)
2022	→ Çaykur Rizespor (loan)	11	(3)
2022–2025	Beşiktaş	96	(13)
2025–	Spartak Moscow	40	(6)

International career^{‡}
2014	Portugal U15	2	(0)
2015	Portugal U16	3	(0)
2014–2016	Portugal U17	30	(2)
2016–2018	Portugal U19	16	(5)
2017–2019	Portugal U20	13	(0)
2018–2021	Portugal U21	13	(2)
2018	Portugal	2	(0)
Medal record
Men's football
Representing Portugal
UEFA European Under-21 Championship
Runner-up	2021 Hungary–Slovenia
UEFA European Under-19 Championship
Runner-up	2017 Georgia
UEFA European Under-17 Championship
Winner	2016 Finland
- * Club domestic league appearances and goals as of 22 November 2026 ‡ National team caps and goals as of 31 March 2021

Gedson Carvalho Fernandes (born 9 January 1999) is a professional footballer who plays as a midfielder for Russian Premier League club Spartak Moscow. Born in São Tomé and Príncipe, he has represented the Portugal national team.

== Club career ==
=== Benfica ===
Born in São Tomé, Fernandes started his youth career at SC Frielas in Portugal in 2008. A year later, he joined S.L. Benfica's youth system, where he progressed to the club's reserve team in 2017. On 11 February that year, he made his professional debut with Benfica B in a LigaPro 4–2 win over Desportivo das Aves.

Following his promotion to Benfica's first team in the 2018–19 season, Fernandes debuted as a starter in a 1–0 home win over Fenerbahçe in the first leg of the UEFA Champions League third qualifying round on 7 August 2018. A week later, in the second leg away, he scored a 26th-minute opener in a 1–1 draw, which qualified Benfica to the competition's play-off round.

==== Tottenham Hotspur (loan) ====
Fernandes signed on an 18-month loan for Premier League club Tottenham Hotspur on 15 January 2020. He made his Premier League debut coming on in the 80th minute away against Watford on 18 January, which ended 0–0. Fernandes was recalled by Benfica on 1 February 2021.

==== Galatasaray (loan) ====
In January 2021, Fernandes moved to Turkish club Galatasaray, on a loan deal until the end of the season.

=== Beşiktaş ===
On 3 February 2022, Turkish club Beşiktaş announced a deal to purchase Fernandes. Since the club already had met their maximum quota of foreign players, his contract was made to start on 1 July 2022. Until then, Benfica loaned him to fellow Süper Lig club Çaykur Rizespor.

On 13 September 2023, Fernandes extended his contract with Beşiktaş until the end of the 2026–27 season.

=== Spartak Moscow ===
On 31 July 2025, Fernandes signed a four-year contract with Spartak Moscow in Russia.

== Career statistics ==
=== Club ===
As of match played 22 November 2026

Appearances and goals by club, season and competition
Club	Season	League			National cup (Note: Includes Taça de Portugal, FA Cup, Turkish Cup)		League cup (Note: Includes Taça da Liga, EFL Cup)		Europe		Other		Total	
Club	Season	Division	Apps	Goals	Apps	Goals	Apps	Goals	Apps	Goals	Apps	Goals	Apps	Goals
Benfica B	2016–17	LigaPro	9	0	—		—		—		—		9	0
Benfica B	2017–18	LigaPro	31	5	—		—		—		—		31	5
Benfica B	Total		40	5	—		—		—		—		40	5
Benfica	2018–19	Primeira Liga	22	0	4	1	4	0	16 (Note: Ten appearances and two goals in UEFA Champions League, six appearances in UEFA Europa League)	2	—		46	3
Benfica	2019–20	Primeira Liga	7	0	1	0	3	0	2 (Note: Appearances in UEFA Champions League)	0	0	0	13	0
Benfica	2021–22	Primeira Liga	3	0	1	0	0	0	0	0	—		4	0
Benfica	Total		32	0	6	1	7	0	18	2	0	0	63	3
Tottenham Hotspur (loan)	2019–20	Premier League	7	0	3	0	0	0	2	0	—		12	0
Tottenham Hotspur (loan)	2020–21	Premier League	0	0	1	0	1	0	0	0	—		2	0
Tottenham Hotspur (loan)	Total		7	0	4	0	1	0	2	0	—		14	0
Galatasaray (loan)	2020–21	Süper Lig	17	0	1	1	—		—		—		18	1
Çaykur Rizespor (loan)	2021–22	Süper Lig	11	3	0	0	—		—		—		11	3
Beşiktaş	2022–23	Süper Lig	33	3	3	0	—		—		—		36	3
Beşiktaş	2023–24	Süper Lig	29	3	6	0	—		10 (Note: Appearances in UEFA Europa Conference League)	0	—		45	3
Beşiktaş	2024–25	Süper Lig	34	7	4	0	—		10 (Note: Appearances in UEFA Europa League)	5	1 (Note: Appearance in Turkish Super Cup)	0	49	12
Beşiktaş	2025–26	Süper Lig	0	0	0	0	—		1	0	—		1	0
Beşiktaş	Total		96	13	13	0	—		21	5	1	0	131	18
Spartak Moscow	2025–26	Russian Premier League	27	5	9	1	—		—		—		36	6
Spartak Moscow	2026–27	Russian Premier League	13	1	3	0	—		—		1 (Note: Appearance in Russian Super Cup)	0	17	1
Spartak Moscow	Total		40	6	12	1	—		—		1	0	53	7
Career total			243	27	36	3	8	0	41	7	2	0	330	37

== Honours ==
Benfica Youth

- Campeonato Nacional de Juniores: 2017–18

Benfica

- Primeira Liga: 2018–19

Beşiktaş

- Turkish Cup: 2023–24
- Turkish Super Cup: 2024

Spartak Moscow

- Russian Cup: 2025–26

Portugal U17

- UEFA European Under-17 Championship: 2016

Individual

- 2016 UEFA European Under-17 Championship Team of the Tournament
- Primeira Liga Best Young Player of the Month: August 2018
- Russian Premier League Goal of the Month: April 2026 (for Spartak Moscow against Akhmat Grozny on 19 April 2026).
