= Fali Candé =

Bissau-Guinean footballer (born 1998)

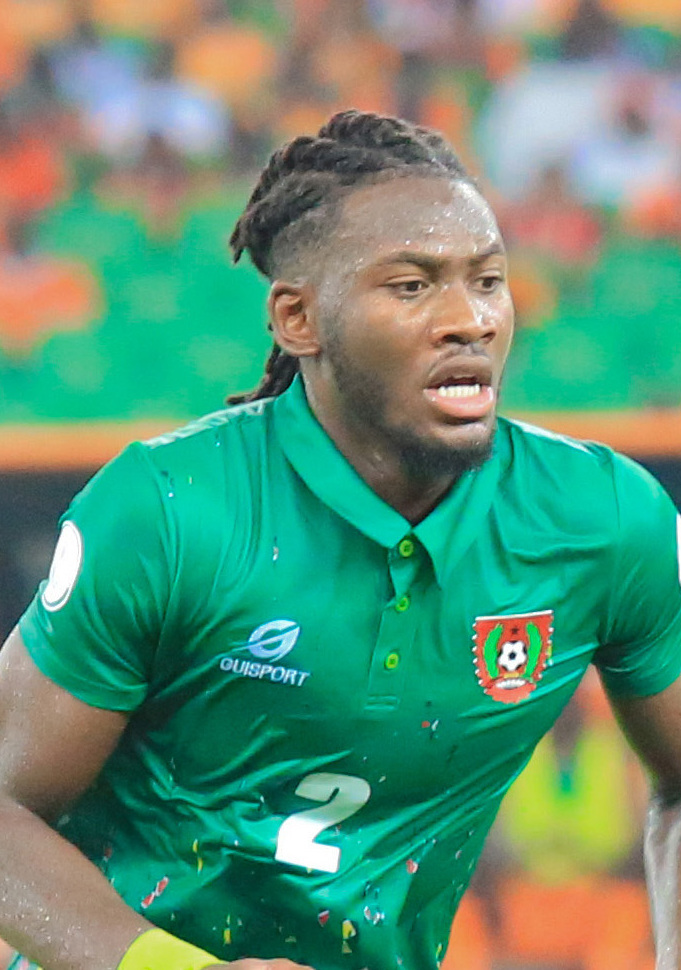
- Candé in 2024

Personal information
- Date of birth: 24 January 1998 (age 28)
- Place of birth: Bissau, Guinea Bissau
- Height: 1.84 m (6 ft 0 in)
- Position: Defender

Team information
- Current team: Sassuolo
- Number: 5

Youth career
- 2009–2011: Estrela da Amadora
- 2011–2012: Atlético CP
- 2012–2015: Casa Pia
- 2015–2016: Niendorfer
- 2016–2017: Porto

Senior career*
Years	Team	Apps	(Gls)
2017–2018	Benfica B	0	(0)
2017–2018	→ Casa Pia (loan)	13	(0)
2018–2022	Portimonense	47	(3)
2022–2025	Metz	82	(1)
2024–2025	Metz II	2	(0)
2025	→ Venezia (loan)	17	(1)
2025–	Sassuolo	12	(0)

International career^{‡}
2021–	Guinea-Bissau	33	(1)
- * Club domestic league appearances and goals as of 25 May 2026 ‡ National team caps and goals as of 12 October 2025

Fali Candé (born 24 January 1998) is a Bissau-Guinean professional footballer who plays as a defender for Serie A club Sassuolo and the Guinea-Bissau national team.

== Club career ==
Candé made his professional debut with Portimonense in a 2–2 Primeira Liga tie with Benfica on 10 June 2020.

On 26 January 2022, Candé signed a contract with Metz in France until June 2026.

On 22 January 2025, Candé moved to Venezia in Italy on loan with an option to buy. On 12 June 2025, Venezia exercised their option to buy and signed a three-year contract with Candé.

On 10 August 2025, Candé signed with Sassuolo.

== International career ==
Candé made his debut for Guinea-Bissau national team on 26 March 2021 in an AFCON 2021 qualifier against Eswatini.

== Career statistics ==
=== Club ===
As of match played 25 May 2025

Appearances and goals by club, season and competition
Club	Season	League			National cup		League Cup		Europe		Other		Total	
Club	Season	Division	Apps	Goals	Apps	Goals	Apps	Goals	Apps	Goals	Apps	Goals	Apps	Goals
Benfica B	2017–18	Liga Portugal 2	0	0	—		—		—		—		0	0
Casa Pia (loan)	2017–18	Campeonato de Portugal	13	0	2	0	1	0	—		—		16	0
Portimonense	2019–20	Primeira Liga	9	0	0	0	0	0	—		—		9	0
Portimonense	2020–21	Primeira Liga	22	2	1	0	0	0	—		—		23	2
Portimonense	2021–22	Primeira Liga	16	1	1	0	1	0	—		—		18	1
Portimonense	Total		47	3	2	0	1	0	—		—		50	3
Metz	2021–22	Ligue 1	11	0	—		—		—		—		11	0
Metz	2022–23	Ligue 2	38	1	2	0	—		—		—		40	1
Metz	2023–24	Ligue 1	25	0	0	0	—		—		1 (Note: Appearance in Ligue 1 relegation/promotion play-offs)	0	26	0
Metz	2024–25	Ligue 2	8	0	0	0	—		—		—		8	0
Metz	Total		81	1	2	0	—		—		1	0	84	1
Metz II	2024–25	National 3	2	0	—		—		—		—		2	0
Venezia (loan)	2024–25	Serie A	17	1	—		—		—		—		17	1
Sassuolo	2025–26	Serie A	0	0	0	0	—		—		—		0	0
Career total			161	5	6	0	2	0	0	0	1	0	170	5

=== International ===
As of match played 12 October 2025

Appearances and goals by national team and year
National team	Year	Apps	Goals
Guinea-Bissau	2021	8	0
Guinea-Bissau	2022	6	0
Guinea-Bissau	2023	5	0
Guinea-Bissau	2024	8	0
Guinea-Bissau	2025	6	1
Total		33	1

Scores and results list Guines-Bissau's goal tally first, score column indicates score after each Candé goal.

List of international goals scored by Fali Candé
No.	Date	Venue	Opponent	Score	Result	Competition
1	8 September 2025	Estádio 24 de Setembro, Bissau, Guinea-Bissau	Djibouti	2–0	2–0	2026 FIFA World Cup qualification
