= Aylton Boa Morte =

Portuguese footballer

Personal information
- Full name: Aylton Filipe Boa Morte
- Date of birth: 23 September 1993 (age 33)
- Place of birth: Almada, Portugal
- Height: 1.82 m (5 ft 11 1/2 in)
- Position: Winger

Team information
- Current team: Khor Fakkan
- Number: 10

Youth career
- 2007–2008: Cova Piedade
- 2008–2011: Amora
- 2011–2012: Beira Mar Almada

Senior career*
Years	Team	Apps	(Gls)
2012–2013	Pinhalnovense	23	(2)
2013–2014	Joane	31	(8)
2014–2015	Ribeirão	25	(1)
2015–2016	Tirsense	20	(4)
2016–2017	Salgueiros	30	(4)
2017–2019	Estoril	29	(3)
2018	→ Cova Piedade (loan)	13	(0)
2019–2022	Portimonense	97	(14)
2022–2023	Khor Fakkan	37	(12)
2023–2025	Kayserispor	50	(12)
2025–	Khor Fakkan	36	(11)
- * Club domestic league appearances and goals as of 02:48, 27 August 2026 (UTC)

Aylton Filipe Boa Morte (born 23 September 1993) is a Portuguese professional footballer who plays as a winger for UAE Pro League club Khor Fakkan.

== Club career ==
=== Estoril ===
Born in Almada, Setúbal District of São Toméan descent, Boa Morte played lower league football until the age of 23. On 15 June 2017, he moved straight to the Primeira Liga after signing a three-year contract with G.D. Estoril Praia.

Boa Morte played his first match in the Portuguese top division on 9 August 2017, coming on as a late substitute in a 4–0 away loss against FC Porto. In January 2018, he was loaned to LigaPro club C.D. Cova da Piedade for five months.

=== Portimonense ===
In another winter transfer window move, Boa Morte joined Portimonense S.C. on 31 January 2019. He scored his first top-tier goal on 10 March in a 5–1 home rout of C.D. Nacional, and repeated the feat the following matchday at B-SAD (2–2).

=== Later career ===
In January 2022, having scored 20 goals at the Estádio Municipal de Portimão and provided 12 assists, Boa Morte moved to UAE Pro League side Khor Fakkan Club on a one-and-a-half-year contract. In summer 2023, the free agent joined Kayserispor of the Turkish Süper Lig.

Boa Morte returned to Khor Fakkan on 30 January 2025.

== Personal life ==
Boa Morte's uncle, Luís, was also a footballer. He spent several years as a professional in England, and was a longtime Portugal international.

== Career statistics ==
As of match played 25 May 2024

Appearances and goals by club, season and competition
Club	Season	League			National cup (Note: Includes Taça de Portugal, UAE President's Cup, Turkish Cup)		League cup (Note: Includes Taça da Liga, UAE League Cup)		Total	
Club	Season	Division	Apps	Goals	Apps	Goals	Apps	Goals	Apps	Goals
Pinhalnovense	2012–13	Segunda Divisão	23	2	2	1	—		25	3
Joane	2013–14	Campeonato Nacional de Seniores	31	8	1	0	—		32	8
Ribeirão	2014–15	Campeonato Nacional de Seniores	25	1	2	1	—		27	2
Tirsense	2015–16	Campeonato de Portugal	20	4	1	0	—		21	4
Salgueiros	2016–17	Campeonato de Portugal	30	4	0	0	—		30	4
Estoril	2017–18	Primeira Liga	10	0	1	0	1	0	12	0
Estoril	2018–19	LigaPro	19	3	2	1	4	0	25	4
Estoril	Total		29	3	3	1	5	0	37	4
Cova Piedade (loan)	2017–18	LigaPro	13	0	0	0	0	0	13	0
Portimonense	2018–19	Primeira Liga	13	2	0	0	0	0	13	2
Portimonense	2019–20	Primeira Liga	33	4	0	0	3	1	36	5
Portimonense	2020–21	Primeira Liga	34	5	0	0	—		34	5
Portimonense	2021–22	Primeira Liga	17	3	4	4	2	1	23	8
Portimonense	Total		97	14	4	4	5	2	106	20
Khor Fakkan	2021–22	UAE Pro League	12	4	0	0	0	0	12	4
Khor Fakkan	2022–23	UAE Pro League	25	8	2	0	4	5	31	13
Khor Fakkan	Total		37	12	2	0	4	5	43	17
Kayserispor	2023–24	Süper Lig	32	8	2	2	—		34	10
Career total			337	56	17	9	14	7	368	72
