= Oscar Barreto =

Colombian footballer (born 1993)

Óscar Barreto
Personal information
- Full name: Óscar David Barreto Pérez
- Date of birth: 28 April 1993 (age 33)
- Place of birth: Bogotá, Colombia
- Height: 1.73 m (5 ft 8 in)
- Position: Right winger

Team information
- Current team: Club Deportivo Universidad César Vallejo
- Number: 7

Youth career
- La Equidad

Senior career*
Years	Team	Apps	(Gls)
2014–2015	La Equidad	53	(6)
2016–2021	Millonarios	44	(3)
2017–2018	→ Rio Ave (loan)	26	(1)
2021–2022	Sport Huancayo	21	(3)
2022	Santa Clara	10	(0)
2023	Unión Comercio	33	(5)
2024–	UCV	12	(1)
- * Club domestic league appearances and goals as of 12 February 2023

Óscar David Barreto Pérez (born 28 April 1993) is a Colombian professional footballer who plays as a right winger for Peruvian club Club Deportivo Universidad César Vallejo.
