= Sana Gomes (footballer, born 2002) =

Bissau-Guinean footballer

Personal information
- Full name: Sana Dafa Gomes
- Date of birth: 7 September 2002 (age 24)
- Place of birth: Bissau, Guinea-Bissau
- Height: 1.74 m (5 ft 9 in)
- Position: Left-back

Team information
- Current team: Al Rams
- Number: 19

Youth career
- 2017–2018: Estrela
- 2018–2019: Real S.C.
- 2019–2021: Alverca

Senior career*
Years	Team	Apps	(Gls)
2021–2022	Portimonense	8	(0)
2022–2025	Al Wasl	0	(0)
2025–	Al Rams	5	(0)
- * Club domestic league appearances and goals as of 20:53, 9 June 2022 (UTC)

Sana Dafa Gomes (born 9 July 2002) is a Bissau-Guinean professional footballer who plays for Al Rams as a left-back.

== Club career ==
A youth product of Estrela, Real S.C. and Alverca, Gomes moved to Portimonense on 16 July 2021. Gomes made his professional debut with Portimonense in a 3–2 Primeira Liga loss to Sporting CP on 29 December 2021.
