= Adewale Sapara =

Nigerian footballer

Personal information
- Full name: Adewale Oluwafemi Sapara
- Date of birth: 27 January 1995 (age 31)
- Place of birth: Lagos, Nigeria
- Height: 1.75 m (5 ft 9 in)
- Position: Left winger

Team information
- Current team: 1º Dezembro
- Number: 17

Youth career
- Team Lagos

Senior career*
Years	Team	Apps	(Gls)
2014	Farense B	0	(6)
2014	Quarteirense	9	(1)
2015	Sertanense	18	(2)
2016	ARC Oleiros		
2016–2018	Almancilense	26	(11)
2018	ARC Oleiros	11	(8)
2019–2020	Olhanense	40	(23)
2020–2022	Leixões	36	(10)
2022–2024	Portimonense	9	(0)
2023–2024	→ Farense (loan)	7	(0)
2026–	1º Dezembro	10	(3)
- * Club domestic league appearances and goals as of 7 May 2026

Adewale Oluwafemi Sapara (born 27 January 1995) is a Nigerian professional footballer who plays as a left winger for Portuguese club 1º Dezembro.

== Career ==
Sapara started with a third division side when he arrived Portugal in the 2018/2019 season. He was adjudged the most valuable player in the division in his first stint.

He would follow that dazzling season with another, with a promotion to the second division with Leixões.

=== Leixões SC ===
On 1 July 2020, Sapara signed a contract with Leixões in the Liga Sabseg.

At Leixões, Sapara was six times voted MVP in the course of the season and also emerged his club’s highest goal scorer.

=== Portimonese S.C. ===
On 31 January 2022, Sapara moved to Portimonense in the Liga Bwin.
