= Lucas Possignolo =

Brazilian footballer

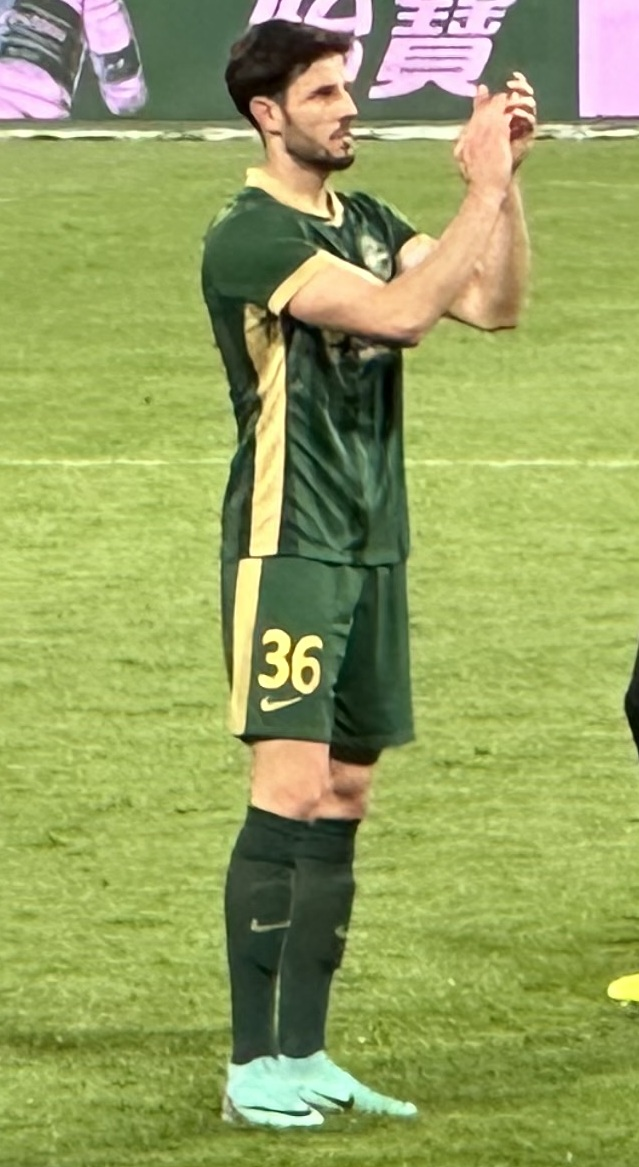
- Possignolo in April 2025

Personal information
- Date of birth: 11 May 1994 (age 32)
- Place of birth: Piracicaba, Brazil
- Height: 1.85 m (6 ft 1 in)
- Position: Central defender

Team information
- Current team: Zhejiang FC
- Number: 36

Youth career
- 2011–2013: São Paulo

Senior career*
Years	Team	Apps	(Gls)
2014–2017	São Paulo	0	(0)
2014	→ Portimonense (loan)	7	(0)
2015–2017	→ Portimonense (loan)	50	(4)
2017–2022	Portimonense	133	(7)
2022–	Zhejiang FC	123	(4)
- * Club domestic league appearances and goals as of 8 November 2026

Lucas Possignolo (born 11 May 1994), or simply Lucas, is a Brazilian professional footballer who plays as a central defender for Chinese Super League club Zhejiang FC.

== Club career ==
Possignolo made his professional debut in the Segunda Liga for Portimonense on 9 March 2014 in a game against Desportivo das Aves.

On 17 April 2022, he joined Chinese Super League club Zhejiang.

== Career statistics ==
As of match played 8 November 2026

Appearances and goals by club, season and competition
Club	Season	League			National cup		League cup		Continental		Other		Total	
Club	Season	Division	Apps	Goals	Apps	Goals	Apps	Goals	Apps	Goals	Apps	Goals	Apps	Goals
Portimonense (loan)	2013–14	LigaPro	7	0	0	0	0	0	—		—		7	0
Portimonense (loan)	2015–16	LigaPro	33	1	3	1	4	0	—		—		40	2
Portimonense (loan)	2016–17	LigaPro	17	3	0	0	0	0	—		—		17	3
Portimonense (loan)	Total		50	4	3	1	4	0	—		—		57	8
Portimonense	2017–18	Primeira Liga	26	1	1	0	2	0	—		—		29	1
Portimonense	2018–19	Primeira Liga	28	0	1	0	1	0	—		—		30	0
Portimonense	2019–20	Primeira Liga	26	2	1	0	0	0	—		—		27	2
Portimonense	2020–21	Primeira Liga	28	2	0	0	—		—		—		28	0
Portimonense	2021–22	Primeira Liga	25	2	3	0	2	0	—		—		30	2
Portimonense	Total		133	7	6	0	5	0	—		—		144	7
Zhejiang FC	2022	Chinese Super League	19	0	4	0	—		—		—		23	0
Zhejiang FC	2023	Chinese Super League	25	1	1	0	—		5	2	—		31	3
Zhejiang FC	2024	Chinese Super League	25	0	2	1	—		5	0	—		32	1
Zhejiang FC	2025	Chinese Super League	29	3	1	0	—		—		—		30	3
Zhejiang FC	2026	Chinese Super League	25	0	0	0	—		—		—		25	0
Zhejiang FC	Total		123	4	8	1	—		10	2	—		141	7
Career total			313	15	17	2	9	0	10	2	0	0	349	19
