= Pedrão (footballer, born 1997) =

Brazilian footballer

Personal information
- Full name: Pedro Henrique de Oliveira Correia
- Date of birth: 3 May 1997 (age 29)
- Place of birth: São Paulo, Brazil
- Height: 1.94 m (6 ft 4 in)
- Position: Centre back

Team information
- Current team: Maccabi Haifa
- Number: 44

Youth career
- 2012–2017: Água Santa
- 2017: → Palmeiras (loan)

Senior career*
Years	Team	Apps	(Gls)
2016–2017	Água Santa	8	(0)
2018–2022	Palmeiras	0	(0)
2019	→ América Mineiro (loan)	9	(1)
2020	→ Athletico Paranaense (loan)	2	(0)
2020–2021	→ Nacional (loan)	30	(1)
2021–2022	→ Portimonense (loan)	17	(0)
2022–2024	Portimonense	70	(5)
2024–	Maccabi Haifa	17	(0)
- * Club domestic league appearances and goals as of 23 June 2026

Pedro Henrique de Oliveira Correia (born 5 May 1997), commonly known as Pedrão, is a Brazilian footballer who plays for Israeli club Maccabi Haifa. Mainly a central defender, he can also play as a defensive midfielder.

== Club career ==
Born in São Paulo, Pedrão joined the youth setup of Água Santa at the age of 15. While playing for the 2015 and 2016 editions of the Copa São Paulo de Futebol Júnior, he drew the attention of scouts. In 2016, he was promoted to the senior team and went on to represent the side in Campeonato Paulista. Although he received an offer from Grêmio at the end of the season, nothing materialised.

On 21 February 2017, Pedrão was loaned to Palmeiras for a year and was assigned to the under-20 team. In October, Italian club S.P.A.L. 2013 expressed their desire to sign him although nothing materialised.

In December 2017, Palmeiras announced the signing of Pedrão on a five-year deal, although the percentage of rights acquired was not disclosed.

In January 2019, Pedrão was loaned to América Mineiro for a year. On 21 February of the following year, he moved to Athletico Paranaense also in a temporary deal.

On 11 August 2021, he joined Portimonense in Portugal on loan.

On 29 August 2024, Maccabi Haifa signed Pedrão from Portimonense in a transfer worth €1.3 million. He signed a three year deal with the club.

== Style of play ==
Although Pedrão started his career as a defender, he switched his position to the midfield because he could attack and score goals. He can also play as a right winger.
