= Henrique Jocú =

Portuguese footballer

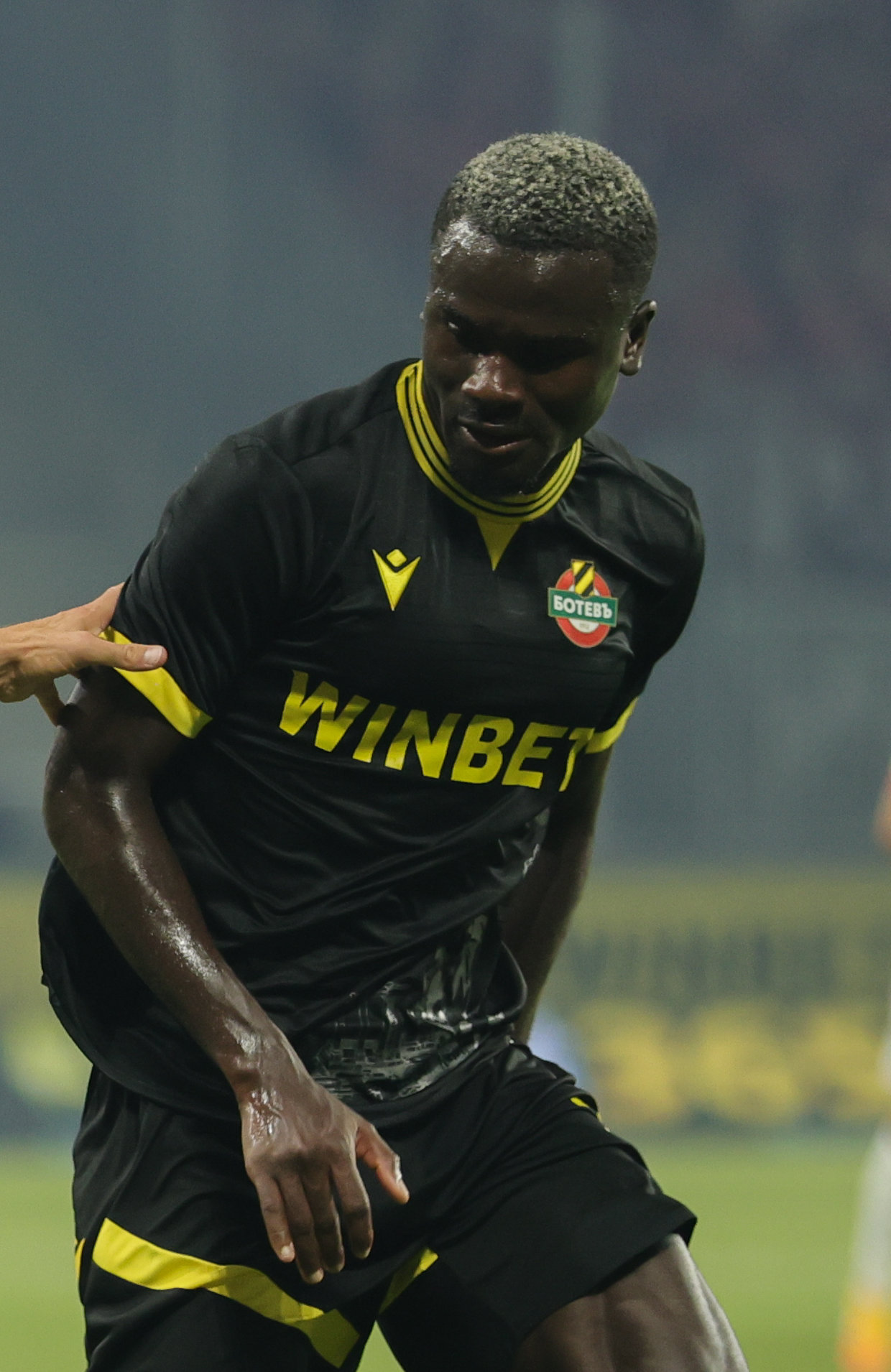

Personal information
- Date of birth: 9 September 2001 (age 25)
- Place of birth: Bissau, Guinea Bissau
- Height: 1.77 m (5 ft 10 in)
- Position: Defensive midfielder

Team information
- Current team: Botev Plovdiv
- Number: 28

Youth career
- 2013–2020: Benfica

Senior career*
Years	Team	Apps	(Gls)
2020–2021	Benfica B	1	(0)
2021–2023	Portimonense	25	(0)
2023–2025	Feirense	41	(2)
2025	Hapoel Tel Aviv	13	(0)
2025–	Botev Plovdiv	13	(0)

International career^{‡}
2016	Portugal U15	2	(0)
2017	Portugal U16	6	(0)
2017–2018	Portugal U17	24	(0)
2018–2019	Portugal U18	10	(1)
2019–2020	Portugal U19	6	(0)
- * Club domestic league appearances and goals as of 11 June 2026 ‡ National team caps and goals as of 25 November 2020

Henrique Jocú (born 9 September 2001) is a professional footballer who plays as a defensive midfielder for Bulgarian First League club Botev Plovdiv. Born in Guinea Bissau, Jocú is a former youth international for Portugal.

== Playing career ==
On 4 April 2020, Jocú signed his first professional contract with Benfica B. Jocú made his professional debut with Benfica B in a 3–2 LigaPro win over Cova da Piedade on 25 November 2020.

On 15 July 2021 he signed a three-year contract with Portimonense.

On 15 July 2023, Jocú signed for Liga Portugal 2 club Feirense.
