= João Veras =

Brazilian footballer

Personal information
- Full name: João Henrique Oliveira Veras
- Date of birth: 26 October 2000 (age 26)
- Place of birth: Gama, Brazil
- Height: 1.87 m (6 ft 2 in)
- Position: Forward

Youth career
- 2016–2017: Palmeirinha
- 2017–2020: XV de Piracicaba

Senior career*
Years	Team	Apps	(Gls)
2019–2020	XV de Piracicaba	10	(0)
2020–2023	Ponte Preta	40	(6)
2022–2023	→ Portimonense (loan)	6	(1)
2023	→ Ferroviária (loan)	2	(1)
2023	Botafogo-SP	5	(0)
2024–	Hoang Anh Gia Lai	10	(1)
- * Club domestic league appearances and goals as of 9 March 2024

João Henrique Oliveira Veras (born 26 October 2000) is a Brazilian professional footballer who plays as a forward for V.League 1 club Hoang Anh Gia Lai.

== Professional career ==
Veras began his senior career with the Brazilian club XV de Piracicaba in 2019, before transferring to Ponte Preta in 2020. He joined the Portuguese club Portimonense on loan in the Primeira Liga on 13 January 2022, with an option to buy. He made his professional debut with Ponte Preta in a 2–0 Campeonato Paulista win over Novorizontino on 22 July 2020.

On 17 January 2023, Veras moved on a new loan to Ferroviária.

In February 2024, Veras joined V.League 1 side LPBank Hoàng Anh Gia Lai.
