= Welinton Júnior =

Brazilian footballer (born 1993)

Personal information
- Full name: Welinton Júnior Ferreira dos Santos
- Date of birth: 8 June 1993 (age 33)
- Place of birth: São Paulo, Brazil
- Height: 1.75 m (5 ft 9 in)
- Positions: Forward; right winger

Team information
- Current team: Portimonense
- Number: 93

Youth career
- 2011–2012: Grêmio
- 2012: Coritiba

Senior career*
Years	Team	Apps	(Gls)
2013–2015	Goiás	28	(4)
2015–2016	Joinville	23	(2)
2015	→ Paysandu (loan)	18	(4)
2016	→ CRB (loan)	23	(5)
2017	Mirassol	13	(1)
2017	→ Paysandu (loan)	20	(1)
2018	Ferroviária	11	(0)
2018	Brasil de Pelotas	22	(5)
2019	Coritiba	11	(1)
2019–2020	Desportivo Aves	23	(7)
2020–2023	Portimonense	46	(11)
2021	→ Shonan Bellmare (loan)	3	(0)
2023–2024	Gangwon FC	12	(0)
2025–	Portimonense	18	(2)
- * Club domestic league appearances and goals as of 20 June 2026

Welinton Júnior Ferreira dos Santos (born 8 June 1993), simply known as Welinton Júnior, is a Brazilian footballer who plays as a forward or right winger for Liga Portugal 2 club Portimonense.

== Career ==
Welinton Júnior played youth-level football for Grêmio and Coritiba before moving to Goiás, where he made his senior debut as a second-half substitute on 30 April 2013 in a Campeonato Goiano game against Aparecidense. He made his national competition debut in the 2013 Copa do Brasil against Fluminense FC on 22 August 2013, deputising for Tartá, who was cup-tied.

In March 2015 he signed a two-year contract with Joinville. Despite playing the majority of games in the 2015 Campeonato Catarinense, he was dropped from the first team after six rounds of the 2015 Campeonato Brasileiro Série A, and loaned to Paysandu until the end of the 2015 Campeonato Brasileiro Série B season. He returned to Joinville having scored 4 goals in 18 games, with a willingness to fight for a place in the team. In June 2016 he was loaned out again, this time to CRB, to play in 2016 Campeonato Brasileiro Série B.

In January 2017, he moved to play for Mirassol in the Campeonato Paulista. At the end of the competition he signed for a second time for Paysandu, on a six-month contract until the end of 2017 Campeonato Brasileiro Série B.

For the 2018 season he signed for another Campeonato Paulista side for the first half of the year, Ferroviária. For the national league season he moved to Brasil de Pelotas to compete in 2018 Campeonato Brasileiro Série B.

He signed for Coritiba in January 2019, on a one-year contract.

On 6 August 2025, Welinton returned to Portimonense in Portugal on a one-year contract.

== Career statistics ==
As of 25 November 2023

Club	Season	League			State League		Cup		League Cup		Continental		Other		Total	
Club	Season	Division	Apps	Goals	Apps	Goals	!Apps	Goals	Apps	Goals	Apps	Goals	Apps	Goals	Apps	Goals
Goiás	2013	Série A	6	1	2	0	4	0	—		—		—		12	1
Goiás	2014	Série A	15	2	5	1	1	0	—		1 (Note: Appearance in 2014 Copa Sudamericana.)	0	—		22	3
Goiás	Total		21	3	7	1	5	0	—		1	0	—		34	4
Joinville	2015	Série A	3	0	10	1	2	0	—		—		—		15	1
Joinville	2016	Série B	—		10	1	—		—		—		—		10	1
Joinville	Total		3	0	20	2	2	0	—		—		—		25	2
Paysandu	2015	Série B	18	4	—		—		—		—		—		18	4
CRB	2016	Série B	23	5	—		—		—		—		—		23	5
Mirassol	2017	Paulista	—		13	1	—		—		—		—		13	1
Paysandu	2017	Série B	20	1	—		—		—		—		—		20	1
Ferroviária	2018	Série D	—		11	0	—		—		—		—		10	0
Brasil de Pelotas	2018	Série B	22	5	—		—		—		—		—		10	0
Coritiba	2019	Série B	6	0	5	1	0	0	—		—		—		11	1
Desportivo Aves	2019–20	Primeira Liga	23	7	—		1	2	1	1	—		—		25	10
Portimonense	2020–21	Primeira Liga	10	0	—		1	0	—		—		—		11	0
Portimonense	2021–22	Primeira Liga	12	5	—		0	0	—		—		—		12	5
Portimonense	2022–23	Primeira Liga	24	6	—		0	0	0	0	—		—		24	6
Portimonense	Total		46	11	—		1	0	0	0	—		—		47	11
Shonan Bellmare (loan)	2021	J1 League	3	0	—		3	0	1	0	—		—		7	0
Gangwon FC	2023	K League 1	9	0	—		—		—		—		0	0	9	0
Career total			194	36	56	5	12	2	2	1	1	0	0	0	265	44
