= Luquinha =

Brazilian footballer

Personal information
- Full name: Lucas Queiroz Canteiro
- Date of birth: 3 October 2000 (age 26)
- Place of birth: Primeiro de Maio, Brazil
- Height: 1.67 m (5 ft 6 in)
- Position: Midfielder

Team information
- Current team: Botafogo-SP
- Number: 18

Senior career*
Years	Team	Apps	(Gls)
2019	Londrina	8	(2)
2019–2024	Portimonense	57	(4)
2024–	Botafogo-SP	8	(0)
- * Club domestic league appearances and goals as of 26 January 2025

Lucas Queiroz Canteiro (born 3 October 2000), known as Luquinha, is a Brazilian professional footballer who plays as a midfielder for Botafogo-SP.

== Professional career ==
On 30 June 2019, Luquinha joined Portimonense in the Portuguese Primeira Liga. Luquinha made his professional debut with Portimonense in a 1-0 Primeira Liga loss to Tondela on 1 February 2020.
