= Estádio Municipal de Portimão =

Stadium in Portimão, Portugal

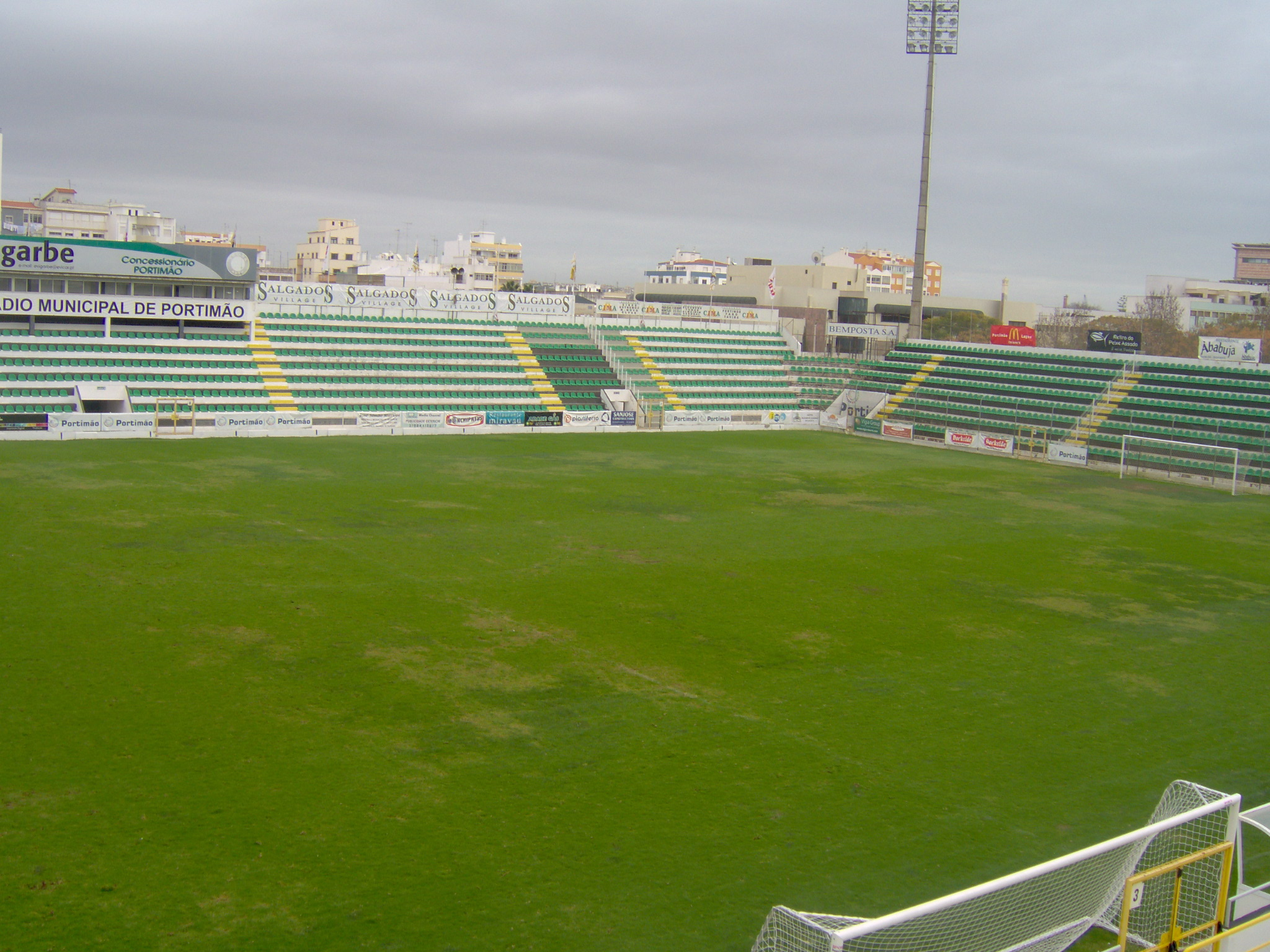
- Interactive map of Estádio Municipal de Portimão
- Location: Portimão, Portugal
- Coordinates: 37°08′9″N 8°32′23″W
- Owner: Portimão Municipality
- Capacity: 4,961
- Surface: Grass
- Field size: 103 x 64 m

Construction
- Groundbreaking: 1936
- Opened: 1937
- Renovated: 2007, 2011, 2017

Tenant
- Portimonense S.C.

Estádio Municipal de Portimão is the current stadium of Portimonense S.C. It is located in the centre of Portimão in the Algarve, Portugal and was opened in 1937 for local football club Portimonense S.C. Its capacity is 4,961 people. It hosted Portimonense's stay in the Primeira Liga in the 1980s.

== History ==
In 2006, Portimonense were forced to play away from the Estádio Municipal in the Estádio Algarve, which – built for Euro 2004 – is 70 kilometres from Portimão. In February 2007, however, Portimonense returned home and the Portimão Municipality purchased the site five months later. This allowed the renovations required for the hosting of higher level competition: the installation of green seats (in the colours of the city), new turnstiles and security facilities.

In the 2009–10 season, Portimonense won promotion to the Primeira Liga for the following season. The summer of 2010 was a time of further renovation of the stadium, as modifications were made to the pitch and drainage system, as well as the west stand, bringing the capacity to 9,544 at the cost of €800,000. The construction took longer than expected and the club had to wait until the turn of the year before they could use their stadium again. The club's first home league match in the renovated stadium was on 19 February 2011 against rival SC Olhanense, that despite the excellent attendance, the game ended in a draw.

The reason for the new postponement is related to the detection of cracks and the company requests a budget increase, anda also for security reasons, with the creation of security boxes for visiting fans, the capacity was reduced to 4,961 spectators.

== Portugal national team matches ==
The following national team matches were held in the stadium.

| # | Date | Score | Opponent | Competition |
|---|---|---|---|---|
| 1. | 5 February 1986 | 2–0 | Luxembourg | Friendly |
