= 2021–22 Rio Ave F.C. season =

Rio Ave
- President: António Silva Campos
- Head coach: Luís Freire
- Stadium: Estádio dos Arcos
- Liga Portugal 2: 1st (promoted)
- Taça de Portugal: Quarter-finals
- Taça da Liga: Third round
- Top goalscorer: League: Pedro Mendes (10); All: Pedro Mendes (10)
Home colours	Away colours

The 2021–22 season was Rio Ave F.C.'s first season back in second division of the Portuguese football league, the Liga Portugal 2, and the 83rd as a football club.

== Players ==
=== First-team squad ===
As of 1 February 2022

Note: Flags indicate national team as defined under FIFA eligibility rules; some limited exceptions apply. Players may hold more than one non-FIFA nationality.

No.	Pos.	Nation	Player
1	GK	BRA	Magrão
2	DF	BRA	Júnio
3	DF	POR	Ângelo Meneses
5	DF	BRA	Hugo Gomes
6	MF	POR	Guga
7	FW	CMR	Fabrice Olinga
8	MF	POR	Vítor Gomes (captain)
9	FW	BRA	Ronan
10	MF	FRA	Amine Oudrhiri
13	DF	SEN	Alhassane Sylla
14	MF	POR	Joca
17	FW	POR	Ukra
18	GK	BRA	Jhonatan (on loan from Vitória Guimarães)

No.	Pos.	Nation	Player
19	FW	POR	Pedro Mendes (on loan from Sporting)
20	DF	POR	Costinha
21	MF	POR	João Graça
22	GK	BRA	Léo
24	DF	POR	Pedro Amaral
25	FW	POR	Zé Manuel
33	DF	BRA	Aderlan Santos
36	DF	BRA	Sávio
42	DF	CRO	Renato Pantalon
70	FW	BRA	Gabrielzinho
80	MF	CPV	Zimbabwé
81	FW	GHA	Abdul-Aziz Yakubu (on loan from Vitória Guimarães)
95	FW	POR	André Pereira

=== Out on loan ===
Note: Flags indicate national team as defined under FIFA eligibility rules; some limited exceptions apply. Players may hold more than one non-FIFA nationality.

No. / Pos. / Nation / Player; — / DF / NZL / Nando Pijnaker (at Sligo Rovers)	No. / Pos. / Nation / Player; — / FW / ANG / Gelson Dala (at Al-Wakrah)

== Competitions ==
Win Draw Loss

=== Overall record ===
Competition	First match	Last match	Starting round	Final position	Record							
Competition	First match	Last match	Starting round	Final position	Pld	W	D	L	GF	GA	GD	Win %
Liga Portugal 2	8 August 2021	15 May 2022	Matchday 1	Winners	34	21	7	6	52	31	+21	61.76
Taça de Portugal	26 September 2021	12 January 2022	Second round	Quarter-finals	5	3	1	1	10	4	+6	60.00
Taça da Liga	25 July 2021	15 December 2021	First round	Third round	4	1	2	1	4	4	+0	25.00
Total					43	25	10	8	66	39	+27	58.14

Source: Soccerway

=== Serie A ===
==== League table ====
Pos	Team	Pld	W	D	L	GF	GA	GD	Pts	Promotion or relegation
1	Rio Ave (C, P)	34	21	7	6	52	31	+21	70	Promotion to Primeira Liga
2	Casa Pia (P)	34	21	5	8	50	22	+28	68	Promotion to Primeira Liga
3	Chaves (O, P)	34	18	10	6	54	35	+19	64	Qualification to Promotion play-offs
4	Feirense	34	17	7	10	50	37	+13	58	
5	Benfica B (I)	34	17	6	11	61	44	+17	57	

Source: Liga Portugal
Rules for classification: 1) Points; 2) Head-to-head points; 3) Head-to-head goal difference; 4) Head-to-head away goals scored; 5) Goal difference; 6) Matches won; 7) Goals scored; 8) Play-off.
(C) Champions; (I) Ineligible for promotion; (O) Play-off winners; (P) Promoted

==== Results summary ====
Overall								Home						Away					
Pld	W	D	L	GF	GA	GD	Pts	W	D	L	GF	GA	GD	W	D	L	GF	GA	GD
27	16	6	5	42	27	+15	54	9	1	3	22	14	+8	7	5	2	20	13	+7

Source: Liga Portugal 2

==== Results by round ====
Round	1	2	3	4	5	6	7	8	9	10	11	12	13	14	15	16	17	18	19	20	21	22	23	24	25	26	27	28	29	30	31	32	33	34
Ground	H	A	A	H	A	H	A	H	A	H	A	H	A	H	A	H	A	A	H	H	A	H	A	H	A	H	A							
Result	W	D	W	W	W	L	D	W	D	L	W	W	L	L	W	W	L	W	W	D	D	W	D	W	W	W	W							
Position	2	3	2	1	1	2	2	3	2	4	4	4	4	4	4	4	4	3	3	3	5	5	5	3	2	2								

Source: Liga Portugal 2
A = Away; H = Home; W = Win; D = Draw; L = Loss

==== Matches ====
The league fixtures were announced on 8 July 2021.

8 August 2021 1	Rio Ave	5–1	Académica	Vila do Conde
14:00 WEST (UTC+1)		Report		Stadium: Estádio dos Arcos

15 August 2021 2	Farense	1–1	Rio Ave	Faro
11:00 WEST (UTC+1)				Stadium: Estádio de São Luís

22 August 2021 3	Varzim	0–3	Rio Ave	Póvoa de Varzim
11:00 WEST (UTC+1)				Stadium: Estádio do Varzim SC

28 August 2021 4	Rio Ave	2–1	Leixões	Vila do Conde
14:00 WEST (UTC+1)		Report		Stadium: Estádio dos Arcos

10 September 2021 5	Estrela da Amadora	2–5	Rio Ave	Amadora
20:15 WEST (UTC+1)				Stadium: Estádio José Gomes

18 September 2021 6	Rio Ave	0–4	Feirense	Vila do Conde
11:00 WEST (UTC+1)		Report		Stadium: Estádio dos Arcos

3 October 2021 7	Porto B	1–1	Rio Ave	Vila Nova de Gaia
15:30 WEST (UTC+1)				Stadium: Estádio Municipal Jorge Sampaio; Referee: Iancu Vasilica

10 October 2021 8	Rio Ave	2–1	Vilafranquense	Vila do Conde
11:00 WEST (UTC+1)		Report		Stadium: Estádio dos Arcos

23 October 2021 9	Penafiel	1–1	Rio Ave	Penafiel
11:00 WEST (UTC+1)				Stadium: Estádio Municipal 25 de Abril; Referee: Cláudio Pereira

31 October 2021 10	Rio Ave	1–2	Académico de Viseu	Vila do Conde
14:00 WEST (UTC+1)		Report		Stadium: Estádio dos Arcos

28 November 2021 12	Rio Ave	1–0	Nacional	Vila do Conde
14:00 WEST (UTC+1)		Report		Stadium: Estádio dos Arcos

11 December 2021 14	Rio Ave	1–2	Mafra	Vila do Conde
14:00 WEST (UTC+1)				Stadium: Estádio dos Arcos

23 January 2022 19	Rio Ave	2–1	Farense	Vila do Conde
15:30 WEST (UTC+1)		Report		Stadium: Estádio dos Arcos

30 January 2022 20	Rio Ave	1–1	Varzim	Vila do Conde
12:45 WEST (UTC+1)		Report		Stadium: Estádio dos Arcos; Referee: António Nobre

2 February 2022 16	Rio Ave	3–1	Sp. Covilhã	Vila do Conde
17:00 WEST (UTC+1)		Report		Stadium: Estádio dos Arcos

14 February 2022 22	Rio Ave	1–0	Estrela da Amadora	Vila do Conde
18:00 WEST (UTC+1)		Report		Stadium: Estádio dos Arcos

20 February 2022 23	Feirense	0–0	Rio Ave	Santa Maria da Feira
14:00 WET (UTC±0)				Stadium: Estadio Marcolino de Castro

27 February 2022 24	Rio Ave	1–0	Porto B	Vila do Conde
14:00 WEST (UTC+1)		Report		Stadium: Estádio dos Arcos

7 March 2022 25	Vilafranquense	1–2	Rio Ave	Rio Maior
18:00 WEST (UTC+1)				Stadium: Estádio Municipal de Rio Maior; Referee: Dinis Gorjão

12 March 2022 26	Rio Ave	2–0	Penafiel	Vila do Conde
14:00 WEST (UTC+1)		Report		Stadium: Estádio dos Arcos

18 March 2022 27	Académico de Viseu	0–1	Rio Ave	Viseu
18:00 WEST (UTC+1)			Aziz 56'	Stadium: Estádio do Fontelo; Referee: Vitor Ferreira

3 April 2022 28	Rio Ave	1–0	Trofense	Vila do Conde
16:00 WEST (UTC+1)				Stadium: Estádio dos Arcos

10 April 2022 29	Nacional	2–0	Rio Ave	Funchal
16:00 WEST (UTC+1)				Stadium: Estádio da Madeira

17 April 2022 30	Rio Ave	2–1	Benfica B	Vila do Conde
16:00 WEST (UTC+1)				Stadium: Estádio dos Arcos

24 April 2022 31	Mafra	1–1	Rio Ave	Mafra
14:00 WEST (UTC+1)				Stadium: Estádio Municipal de Mafra

30 April 2022 32	Rio Ave	1–0	Casa Pia	Vila do Conde
16:00 WEST (UTC+1)				Stadium: Estádio dos Arcos

7 May 2022 33	Sporting da Covilhã	0–1	Rio Ave	Covilhã
14:00 WEST (UTC+1)				Stadium: Estádio Municipal José dos Santos Pinto

15 May 2022 34	Rio Ave	3–0	Chaves	Vila do Conde
16:00 WEST (UTC+1)				Stadium: Estádio dos Arcos

=== Taça de Portugal ===
26 September 2021 Second round	Vitória de Sernache	1–3	Rio Ave	Cernache do Bonjardim
14:00 WEST (UTC+1)	Romário Rodrigues 18'	Report	Ruben Gonçalves 8'; Abdul Yakubu 12'; João Costa 29'	Stadium: Estádio Municipal Nuno Álvares Pereira; Referee: André Narciso

17 October 2021 Third round	Rio Ave	4–0	Boavista	Vila do Conde
20:00 WEST (UTC+1)	Zé Manuel 14' (pen.); Guga 73'; Gabrielzinho 86', 89'	Report		Stadium: Estádio dos Arcos; Referee: Rui Costa

20 November 2021 Fourth round	Rio Ave	2–1	S.C. Olhanense	Vila do Conde
17:00 WET (UTC±0)	Yakubu 58', 68'	Report	Matos 10' (pen.)	Stadium: Estádio dos Arcos; Referee: Helder Malheiro

23 December 2021 Fifth round	Rio Ave	1–1 (a.e.t.) (6–5 p)	Belenenses SAD	Vila do Conde
17:00 WET (UTC±0)	Hugo 42'	Report	Nuno 9'	Stadium: Estádio dos Arcos; Referee: Antonio Nobre

12 January 2022 Quarter-finals	Rio Ave	0–1 (a.e.t.)	Tondela	Vila do Conde
18:45 WET (UTC±0)		Report	Dadashov 96'	Stadium: Estádio dos Arcos; Referee: Artur Soares Dias

=== Taça da Liga ===
25 July 2021 First round	Varzim	1–1 (3–4 p)	Rio Ave	Póvoa de Varzim
15:30 WEST (UTC+01:00)	Ronan Jerônimo 56' (o.g.)	Report	Aderllan Santos 79'	Stadium: Estádio do Varzim SC; Attendance: 0 Referee: Nuno Almeida
	Penalties
	Heliardo (penalty scored); Zé Tiago (penalty scored); Luís Silva (penalty missed); Cássio Scheid (penalty scored); Tavinho (penalty missed)		(penalty missed) Zé Manuel; (penalty scored) Francisco Geraldes; (penalty scored) Aderllan Santos; (penalty scored) Costinha; (penalty scored) Ukra

1 August 2021 Second round	Arouca	0–1	Rio Ave	Arouca
17:00 WEST (UTC+1)		Report	Santos 38'	Stadium: Estádio Municipal de Arouca; Attendance: 358; Referee: Miguel Nogueira

==== Third round ====
Pos	Team	Pld	W	D	L	GF	GA	GD	Pts	Qualification	STA	POR	RAV
1	Santa Clara	2	1	1	0	5	3	+2	4	Advance to knockout phase	—	3–1	—
2	Porto	2	1	0	1	2	3	−1	3		—	—	1–0
3	Rio Ave	2	0	1	1	2	3	−1	1		2–2	—	—

Updated to match(es) played on 15 December 2021. Source: Liga Portugal
Rules for classification: Tiebreakers

22 September 2021 1	Rio Ave	2–2	Santa Clara	Vila do Conde
19:00 WEST (UTC+01:00)	Abdul-Aziz Yakubu 17'; Zé Manuel 59'	Report	Luiz Phellype 15'; Jean Patric 34'	Stadium: Estádio dos Arcos; Attendance: 635; Referee: Fábio Melo

15 December 2021 3	Porto	1–0	Rio Ave	Porto
21:00 WET (UTC±0)	Pepê 83'	Report		Stadium: Estádio do Dragão; Attendance: 4,433; Referee: Miguel Nogueira
