= 2021–22 Taça da Liga =

Allianz Cup

Tournament details
- Country: Portugal
- Dates: 26 July 2021 – 29 January 2022
- Teams: 34

Final positions
- Champions: Sporting CP (4th title)
- Runners-up: Benfica

Tournament statistics
- Matches played: 37
- Goals scored: 94 (2.54 per match)
- Attendance: 99,896 (2,700 per match)

The 2021–22 Taça da Liga was the fifteenth edition of the Taça da Liga (also known as Allianz Cup for sponsorship reasons), a football league cup competition organised by the Liga Portuguesa de Futebol Profissional and contested exclusively by clubs competing in the top two professional tiers of Portuguese football – the Primeira Liga and the LigaPro. It began on 26 July 2021 and concluded with the final in Leiria on 29 January 2022.

Sporting CP were the holders and three-time winners, after beating Braga 1–0 in the 2021 final, and they won their fourth title after defeating Benfica 2–1 in the 2022 final.

== Format ==
Twenty-eight teams consisting in all teams from Primeira and Segunda Liga with exception of the top 6 teams in 2020–21 Primeira Liga take part in the first round; one-legged ties with no extra-time were played between Twenty-eight teams.

In the second round, the fourteen teams advancing from the previous round are joined by the teams placed 5th and 6th in the 2020–21 Primeira Liga. Again, one-legged ties with no extra-time were played between sixteen teams.

The third round features the eight teams advancing from the previous round and the four best-placed teams in the 2020–21 Primeira Liga. The twelve teams will drawn into four groups that are contested in a single round-robin schedule, with each team playing one game at home and one game on the opposition's home.

The four group winners qualify for the knockout phase, which features single-legged ties, again with no extra-time being played. The semi-finals and final are played at a neutral venue, set to be in Leiria in January 2022.

Round	Teams entering in this round	Teams advancing from previous round
First round (28 teams)	16 teams from the 2021–22 Liga Portugal 2; 9 teams ranked 7th–15th in the 2020–21 Primeira Liga; 3 teams promoted to the 2021–22 Primeira Liga	
Second round (16 teams)	2 teams ranked 5th and 6th in the 2020–21 Primeira Liga	14 winners from the first round
Third round (12 teams)	4 teams ranked 1st–4th in the 2020–21 Primeira Liga	8 winners from the second round
Semi-finals (4 teams)		4 group winners from the third round
Final (2 teams)		2 winners from the semi-finals

=== Tiebreakers ===
In the third round, teams are ranked according to points (3 points for a win, 1 point for a draw, 0 points for a loss). If two or more teams are tied on points on completion of the group matches, the following criteria are applied to determine the rankings:

1. highest goal difference in all group matches;
2. highest number of scored goals in all group matches;
3. lowest average age of all players fielded in all group matches (sum of the ages of all fielded players divided by the number of fielded players).

In all other rounds, teams tied at the end of regular time contest a penalty shootout to determine the winner. No extra-time is played.

== Teams ==
Thirty-four teams competing in the two professional tiers of Portuguese football for the 2021–22 season are eligible to participate in this competition. For teams that were either promoted or related, the final position in the previous league season determines in which round they enter the competition.

Third round (Primeira Liga)
Sporting CP (1st)	Porto (2nd)	Benfica (3rd)	Braga (4th)
Second round (Primeira Liga)
Paços de Ferreira (5th)	Santa Clara (6th)		
First round (Primeira and Segunda Liga)
Vitória de Guimarães (7th)	Moreirense (8th)	Famalicão (9th)	Belenenses SAD (10th)
Gil Vicente (11th)	Tondela (12th)	Boavista (13th)	Portimonense (14th)
Marítimo (15th)	Estoril (P1)	Vizela (P1)	Arouca (P1)
Rio Ave (R1)	Farense (R1)	Nacional (R1)	Académica (4th)
Feirense (5th)	Chaves (6th)	Penafiel (7th)	Casa Pia (9th)
Leixões (10th)	Mafra (12th)	Sporting da Covilhã (13th)	Académico de Viseu (14th)
Varzim (15th)	Vilafranquense (17th)	Trofense (P2)	Estrela da Amadora (P2)

Key

- Nth: League position in the 2020–21 season
- P1: Promoted to the Primeira Liga
- R1: Relegated to the Liga Portugal 2
- P2: Promoted to the Liga Portugal 2

== Schedule ==
Round		Draw date	Match date(s)	Teams	Fixtures
First round		8 July 2021	23–26 July 2021	34 → 20	14
Second round		8 July 2021	30 July & 1 August 2021	20 → 12	8
Third round	Matchday 1	2 September 2021	21–23 September 2021	12 → 4	12
Third round	Matchday 2	2 September 2021	26–28 October 2021	12 → 4	12
Third round	Matchday 3	2 September 2021	14–16 December 2021	12 → 4	12
Final four	Semi-finals	2 September 2021	25–26 January 2022	4 → 2	2
Final four	Final	2 September 2021	29 January 2022	2 → 1	1

== First round ==
Twenty-eight teams consisting in all teams from Primeira and Segunda Liga with exception of the top 6 teams in 2020–21 Primeira Liga took part in the first round. Twenty-eight teams were paired against each other for fourteen single-legged ties. The draw took place on 8 July 2021, and the matches were played on 23 and 26 July 2021. Games tied at the end of regular time were decided by a penalty shoot-out, with no extra time being played. The first team drawn in each fixture played at home.

23 July 2021	Portimonense	2–1	Académica	Portimão
20:15 WEST (UTC+01:00)	Willyan Rocha 19'; Aylton Boa Morte 42'	Report	João Traquina 31'	Stadium: Estádio Municipal de Portimão; Attendance: 0 Referee: André Narciso

24 July 2021	Tondela	0–1	Gil Vicente	Tondela
11:00 WEST (UTC+01:00)		Report	Vitor 87'	Stadium: Estádio João Cardoso; Attendance: 0 Referee: Miguel Nogueira

24 July 2021	Estrela da Amadora	2–1	Vizela	Amadora
15:30 WEST (UTC+01:00)	Xavi 15'; Paulinho 89'	Report	Cassiano 66'	Stadium: Estádio José Gomes; Attendance: 0 Referee: David Silva

24 July 2021	Mafra	1–0	Belenenses SAD	Mafra
15:30 WEST (UTC+01:00)	Andrezinho 22'	Report		Stadium: Estádio Municipal de Mafra; Attendance: 0 Referee: João António Gonçalves

24 July 2021	Trofense	0–3	Sporting da Covilhã	Trofa
17:00 WEST (UTC+01:00)		Report	Diogo Almeida 45+1'; André Almeida 53'; Jô Batista 62'	Stadium: Estádio do CD Trofense; Attendance: 0 Referee: Ricardo Baixinho

24 July 2021	Feirense	0–1	Famalicão	Santa Maria da Feira
17:00 WEST (UTC+01:00)		Report	Ivo Rodrigues 17'	Stadium: Estádio Marcolino de Castro; Attendance: 0 Referee: Hugo Silva

24 July 2021	Académico de Viseu	1–4	Casa Pia	Lisbon
17:00 WEST (UTC+01:00)	Paul Ayongo 15'	Report	João Vieira 12'; Lelo 19'; Vitó 85'; Saviour Godwin 90+3'	Stadium: Estádio Pina Manique (Note: The match was originally scheduled to be played Viseu. However due to works, it was later decided it would be played in Lisbon, at Casa Pia home.); Attendance: 0 Referee: Marcos Brazão

24 July 2021	Chaves	1–2	Farense	Chaves
18:00 WEST (UTC+01:00)	João Correia 64'	Report	Pedro Henrique 54'; Eduardo Mancha 88'	Stadium: Estádio Municipal Eng. Manuel Branco Teixeira; Attendance: 0 Referee: Rui Lima

25 July 2021	Penafiel	1–1 (4–3 p)	Moreirense	Penafiel
11:00 WEST (UTC+01:00)	Rui Pedro 66'	Report	Gonçalo Franco 68'	Stadium: Estádio Municipal 25 de Abril; Attendance: 0 Referee: Manuel Mota
	Penalties
	Roberto Rodrigo (penalty scored); Capela (penalty scored); Feliz Vaz (penalty scored); Amorim (penalty missed); Zé Valente (penalty scored)		(penalty scored) Yan; (penalty missed) Rafael Martins; (penalty scored) André Luis; (penalty scored) Walterson; (penalty missed) Gonçalo Franco

25 July 2021	Varzim	1–1 (3–4 p)	Rio Ave	Póvoa de Varzim
15:30 WEST (UTC+01:00)	Ronan Jerônimo 56' (o.g.)	Report	Aderllan Santos 79'	Stadium: Estádio do Varzim SC; Attendance: 0 Referee: Nuno Almeida
	Penalties
	Heliardo (penalty scored); Zé Tiago (penalty scored); Luís Silva (penalty missed); Cássio Scheid (penalty scored); Tavinho (penalty missed)		(penalty missed) Zé Manuel; (penalty scored) Francisco Geraldes; (penalty scored) Aderllan Santos; (penalty scored) Costinha; (penalty scored) Ukra

25 July 2021	Vilafranquense	0–3	Arouca	Rio Maior
17:30 WEST (UTC+01:00)		Report	Eugeni Valderrama 6'; André Silva 30'; João Basso 86' (g.p.)	Stadium: Estádio Municipal de Rio Maior; Attendance: 0 Referee: Fábio Melo

25 July 2021	Nacional	1–2	Estoril	Funchal
18:00 WEST (UTC+01:00)	Bryan Róchez 36'	Report	Miguel Crespo 57'; João Carlos Cardoso Santo 90'	Stadium: Estádio da Madeira; Attendance: 0 Referee: Cláudio Pereira

25 July 2021	Marítimo	0–1	Boavista	Funchal
18:00 WEST (UTC+01:00)		Report	Luís Santos 41'	Stadium: Estádio do Marítimo; Attendance: 1546; Referee: Manuel Oliveira

26 July 2021	Vitória de Guimarães	4–1	Leixões	Guimarães
20:15 WEST (UTC+01:00)	Rochinha 34'; Diogo Gomes 74' (o.g.); Bruno Duarte 84'; Miguel Magalhães 90+4'	Report	Adewale Sapara 21' (g.p.)	Stadium: Estádio D. Afonso Henriques; Attendance: 0 Referee: Hélder Malheiro

== Second round ==
In the second round, the fourteen first-round winners joined the two teams ranked 5th and 6th in the 2021–22 Primeira Liga. Sixteen teams were paired against each other for twelve single-legged ties. The draw took place on 8 July 2021, and the matches were played on 30 July and 1 August 2021. Games tied at the end of regular time were decided by a penalty shoot-out, with no extra time being played. The first team drawn in each fixture played at home.

30 July 2021	Paços de Ferreira	1–1 (4–3 p)	Gil Vicente	Paços de Ferreira
20:15 WEST (UTC+01:00)	Denílson 47'	Report	Bilel Aouacheria 58'	Stadium: Estádio Capital do Móvel; Attendance: 0 Referee: Rui Costa
	Penalties
	Douglas Tanque (penalty scored); Uilton (penalty scored); João Pedro (penalty missed); Juan Delgado (penalty scored); Maracás (penalty scored)		(penalty scored) Talocha; (penalty missed) Paulinho Mota; (penalty missed) Pedrinho; (penalty scored) Rúben Fernandes; (penalty scored) Kanya Fujimoto

1 August 2021	Estrela da Amadora	0–1	Penafiel	Amadora
15:30 WEST (UTC+01:00)	Roberto Rodrigo 36'	Report		Stadium: Estádio José Gomes; Attendance: 302; Referee: Dinis Gorjão

1 August 2021	Famalicão	1–0	Estoril	Vila Nova de Famalicão
14:00 WEST (UTC+01:00)	Bruno Rodrigues 9'	Report		Stadium: Estádio Municipal 22 de Junho; Attendance: 444; Referee: António Nobre

1 August 2021	Farense	0–0 (0–3 p)	Santa Clara	Faro
15:30 WEST (UTC+01:00)		Report		Stadium: Estádio de São Luís; Attendance: 461; Referee: Hugo Silva
	Penalties
	Otávio Gut (penalty missed); Amine Oudrhiri (penalty missed); Elves Baldé (penalty missed)		(penalty scored) Lincoln; (penalty scored) Nené; (penalty scored) Mikel Villanueva

1 August 2021	Arouca	0–1	Rio Ave	Arouca
17:00 WEST (UTC+01:00)		Report	Aderllan Santos 38'	Stadium: Estádio Municipal de Arouca; Attendance: 358; Referee: Miguel Nogueira

1 August 2021	Sporting da Covilhã	3–1	Mafra	Covilhã
17:00 WEST (UTC+01:00)	David Santos 30'; Héliton 88'; Gilberto 90+3'	Report	Bura 59'	Stadium: Estádio Municipal José dos Santos Pinto; Attendance: 177; Referee: Heldér Carvalho

1 August 2021	Casa Pia	0–1	Vitória de Guimarães	Lisbon
18:00 WEST (UTC+01:00)		Report	Bruno Duarte 26'	Stadium: Estádio Pina Manique; Attendance: 266; Referee: Cláudio Pereira

1 August 2021	Boavista	2–0	Portimonense	Porto
20:30 WEST (UTC+01:00)	Tiago Morais 8' (73)	Report		Stadium: Estádio do Bessa; Attendance: 1068; Referee: João Gonçalves

== Third round ==
In the third round, the eight second-round winners joined the four top-ranked teams from the 2020–21 Primeira Liga: Sporting CP (1st), Porto (2nd), Benfica (3rd) and Braga (4th). These twelve teams were drawn into four groups of three, each group containing one of the four top-ranked Primeira Liga teams. Group matches were played in a single round-robin schedule, ensuring that each team played at least one match at home.

=== Group A ===
Pos	Team	Pld	W	D	L	GF	GA	GD	Pts	Qualification	BEN	GUI	SCC
1	Benfica	2	1	1	0	6	3	+3	4	Advance to knockout phase	—	—	3–0
2	Vitória de Guimarães	2	1	1	0	5	3	+2	4		3–3	—	—
3	Sporting da Covilhã	2	0	0	2	0	5	−5	0		—	0–2	—

Updated to match(es) played on 15 December 2021. Source: Liga Portugal
Rules for classification: Tiebreakers

21 September 2021	Sporting da Covilhã	0–2	Vitória de Guimarães	Covilhã
20:15 WEST (UTC+01:00)		Report	Nicolas Janvier 25', 28'	Stadium: Estádio Municipal José dos Santos Pinto; Attendance: 594; Referee: Gustavo Correia

27 October 2021	Vitória de Guimarães	3–3	Benfica	Guimarães
19:30 WEST (UTC+01:00)	André André 21'; Óscar Estupiñán 45+2'; Bruno Duarte 82'	Report	Alfa Semedo 8' (o.g.); Pizzi 15'; Nemanja Radonjić 28'	Stadium: Estádio D. Afonso Henriques; Attendance: 11,065; Referee: Hugo Miguel

15 December 2021	Benfica	3–0	Sporting da Covilhã	Lisbon
19:00 WET (UTC+00:00)	Seferovic 28'; Núñez 68' (pen.), 73'	Report		Stadium: Estádio da Luz; Attendance: 15,291; Referee: Gustavo Correia

=== Group B ===
Pos	Team	Pld	W	D	L	GF	GA	GD	Pts	Qualification	SPO	FAM	PEN
1	Sporting CP	2	2	0	0	3	1	+2	6	Advance to knockout phase	—	2–1	—
2	Famalicão	2	1	0	1	6	2	+4	3		—	—	5–0
3	Penafiel	2	0	0	2	0	6	−6	0		0–1	—	—

Updated to match(es) played on 14 December 2021. Source: Liga Portugal
Rules for classification: Tiebreakers

22 September 2021	Famalicão	5–0	Penafiel	Vila Nova de Famalicão
21:15 WEST (UTC+01:00)	Ivo Rodrigues 35'; Simon Banza 57'; Pedro Marques 70', 89'; Bruno Rodrigues 73'	Report		Stadium: Estádio Municipal 22 de Junho; Attendance: 1,569; Referee: David Silva

26 October 2021	Sporting CP	2–1	Famalicão	Lisbon
21:15 WEST (UTC+01:00)	Ugarte 8'; Nuno Santos 61'	Report	Heriberto Tavares 90'	Stadium: Estádio José Alvalade; Attendance: 14,755; Referee: Manuel Mota

14 December 2021	Penafiel	0–1	Sporting CP	Penafiel
20:15 WET (UTC+00:00)		Report	Tiago Tomás 16'	Stadium: Estádio Municipal 25 de Abril; Attendance: 2,012; Referee: Claúdio Pereira

=== Group C ===
Pos	Team	Pld	W	D	L	GF	GA	GD	Pts	Qualification	BOA	PAÇ	BRA
1	Boavista	2	2	0	0	7	2	+5	6	Advance to knockout phase	—	—	5–1
2	Paços de Ferreira	2	0	1	1	1	2	−1	1		1–2	—	—
3	Braga	2	0	1	1	1	5	−4	1		—	0–0	—

Updated to match(es) played on 16 December 2021. Source: Liga Portugal
Rules for classification: Tiebreakers

23 September 2021	Paços de Ferreira	1–2	Boavista	Paços de Ferreira
20:15 WEST (UTC+01:00)	João Pedro 20'	Report	Yusupha Njie 58'; Gustavo Sauer 73'	Stadium: Estádio Capital do Móvel; Attendance: 988; Referee: Vitor Ferreira

28 October 2021	Braga	0–0	Paços de Ferreira	Braga
20:15 WEST (UTC+01:00)		Report		Stadium: Estádio Municipal de Braga; Attendance: 3,726; Referee: Hélder Malheiro

16 December 2021	Boavista	5–1	Braga	Porto
20:15 WET (UTC+00:00)	Gustavo Sauer 20', 63'; Petar Musa 32'; Yusupha Njie 34'; Nathan Santos 50'	Report	Iuri Medeiros 53' (pen.)	Stadium: Estádio do Bessa; Attendance: 2,969; Referee: Manuel Oliveira

=== Group D ===
Pos	Team	Pld	W	D	L	GF	GA	GD	Pts	Qualification	STA	POR	RAV
1	Santa Clara	2	1	1	0	5	3	+2	4	Advance to knockout phase	—	3–1	—
2	Porto	2	1	0	1	2	3	−1	3		—	—	1–0
3	Rio Ave	2	0	1	1	2	3	−1	1		2–2	—	—

Updated to match(es) played on 15 December 2021. Source: Liga Portugal
Rules for classification: Tiebreakers

22 September 2021	Rio Ave	2–2	Santa Clara	Vila do Conde
19:00 WEST (UTC+01:00)	Abdul-Aziz Yakubu 17'; Zé Manuel 59'	Report	Luiz Phellype 15'; Jean Patric 34'	Stadium: Estádio dos Arcos; Attendance: 635; Referee: Fábio Melo

26 October 2021	Santa Clara	3–1	Porto	Ponta Delgada
18:00 WEST (UTC+01:00)	Andrei Chindriș 17'; Ricardinho 65'; Nené 90+6'	Report	Mehdi Taremi 83'	Stadium: Estádio de São Miguel; Attendance: 1,739; Referee: Manuel Oliveira

15 December 2021	Porto	1–0	Rio Ave	Porto
21:00 WET (UTC+00:00)	Pepê 83'	Report		Stadium: Estádio do Dragão; Attendance: 4,433; Referee: Miguel Nogueira

== Knockout phase ==
The knockout phase was contested as a final-four tournament by the four third-round group winners in one-legged semi-finals and final. All matches were played in a single venue, decided before the competition started. As in the first and second round, games tied at the end of regular time were decided by a penalty shoot-out, with no extra time being played.

All matches were played at Estádio Municipal de Leiria, in Leiria, with the semi-finals scheduled to be played on 25–26 January, and the final on 29 January 2022.

Semi-finals
25 January – Estádio Municipal de Leiria
Benfica (p)	1 (3)
Boavista	1 (2)
26 January – Estádio Municipal de Leiria
Sporting CP	2
Santa Clara	1

Final
29 January – Estádio Municipal de Leiria
Benfica	1
Sporting CP	2

=== Semi-finals ===
25 January 2022
19:45 WET (UTC±00:00)

Benfica	1–1	Boavista
Everton 16'	Report	Gustavo 53' (pen.)
Penalties
Pizzi (penalty missed); Grimaldo (penalty scored); Meïté (penalty scored); Vertonghen (penalty missed); Weigl (penalty scored)	3–2	(penalty missed) Pérez; (penalty missed) Musa; (penalty missed) De Santis; (penalty scored) Abascal; (penalty scored) Hamache

Estádio Municipal de Leiria, Leiria
Attendance: 7,539
Referee: Fábio Veríssimo

26 January 2022
19:45 WET (UTC±00:00)

Sporting CP	2–1	Santa Clara
Villanueva 40' (o.g.); Sarabia 65' (pen.)	Report	Lincoln 32'

Estádio Municipal de Leiria, Leiria
Attendance: 7,337
Referee: António Nobre

=== Final ===
29 January 2022
19:45 WET (UTC±00:00)

Benfica	1–2	Sporting CP
Everton 23'	Report	Inácio 49'; Sarabia 78'

Estádio Municipal de Leiria, Leiria
Attendance: 20,622
Referee: Manuel Mota
