= Darwin Núñez =

Uruguayan footballer (born 1999)

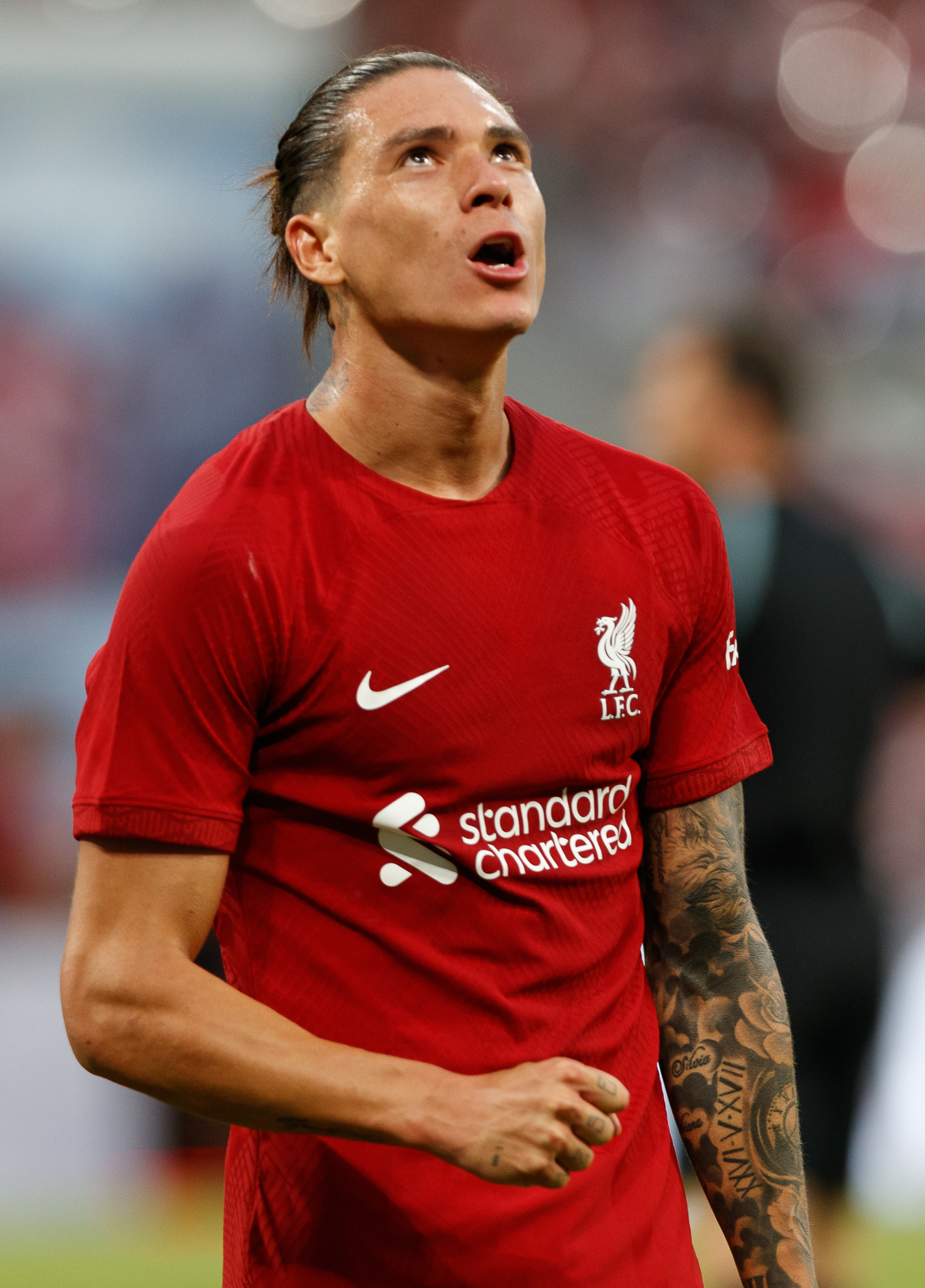
- Núñez playing for Liverpool in 2022

Personal information
- Full name: Darwin Gabriel Núñez Ribeiro
- Date of birth: 24 June 1999 (age 27)
- Place of birth: Artigas, Uruguay
- Height: 1.85 m (6 ft 1 in)
- Position: Striker

Team information
- Current team: Al-Diriyah (on loan from Al-Hilal)
- Number: 29

Youth career
- 2012–2013: La Luz
- 2013–2014: San Miguel
- 2014–2017: Peñarol

Senior career*
| Years | Team | Apps | (Gls) |
| 2017–2019 | Peñarol | 14 | (4) |
| 2019–2020 | Almería | 30 | (16) |
| 2020–2022 | Benfica | 57 | (32) |
| 2022–2025 | Liverpool | 95 | (25) |
| 2025– | Al-Hilal | 16 | (6) |
| 2026– | → Al-Diriyah (loan) | 10 | (3) |

International career^{‡}
| 2018–2019 | Uruguay U20 | 14 | (4) |
| 2019 | Uruguay U22 | 4 | (1) |
| 2019– | Uruguay | 46 | (16) |
Medal record
Men's football
Representing Uruguay
Copa América
| Third place | 2024 United States |
- * Club domestic league appearances and goals as of 23:47, 30 October 2026 (UTC) ‡ National team caps and goals as of 01:50, 18 November 2026 (UTC)

Darwin Gabriel Núñez Ribeiro (Spanish pronunciation: [ˈdaɾwin ˈnuɲeθ]; born 24 June 1999) is a Uruguayan professional footballer who plays as a striker for Saudi Pro League club Al-Diriyah, on loan from Al-Hilal, and the Uruguay national team. Nicknamed "La Pantera" (lit. 'the Panther'), he is known for his technique, explosive speed and athleticism.

Núñez came through Peñarol's youth academy, being promoted to the first team in 2017. In August 2019, he joined Spanish Segunda División club Almería for a club record fee. Benfica signed him in 2020 for a club-record transfer worth €24 million, the most expensive signing in Portuguese football history. In his second season, he won the Bola de Prata for top scorer in the Primeira Liga with 26 goals in 28 games, being named in the Primeira Liga Team of the Year and Primeira Liga Player of the Year. Liverpool then signed him in 2022 for a transfer worth €75 million (£64 million). After winning the 2024–25 Premier League, Núñez was sold to Al-Hilal for €53 million (£46 million).

Having represented Uruguay at various youth levels, Núñez was called up to the senior national team for his first time in 2019. He scored on his international debut against Peru. After missing the 2021 Copa América due to an injury, Núñez represented Uruguay at the 2022 FIFA World Cup, the 2024 Copa América and the 2026 FIFA World Cup.

== Early life ==
Núñez was born in Artigas, Artigas Department. He was born into an impoverished family; his father, Bibiano Núñez, was a builder and his mother, Silvia Ribeiro, was a hawker of milk bottles. Núñez played for local clubs La Luz and San Miguel before being scouted at the age of 14 by former Uruguay international José Perdomo, and then moving by himself to the capital city of Montevideo to join the ranks of Peñarol.

Struggling with homesickness, Núñez returned to his hometown to spend time with his family and went back to Peñarol a year later. At the age of 17, he suffered a cruciate ligament injury that ruled him out for over a year and required two operations. While he was injured, his older brother Junior quit the club and gave up football to provide for the family, telling him, "you're better suited than me".

== Club career ==
=== Early career ===
He made his first-team debut in the Primera División on 22 November 2017, when he came on for Peñarol as a second-half substitute for Maxi Rodríguez in a 2–1 away loss against River Plate Montevideo. The following month, he had knee surgery for a second time. Núñez scored his first professional goal on 13 October 2018, with the opener in a 2–0 home win over Fénix. On 14 July 2019, he scored a hat-trick in a 4–0 victory against Boston River.

On 29 August 2019, Spanish Segunda División club Almería announced the signing of Núñez on a five-year contract, for a rumoured club record fee of US$4.5 million plus $1.5 million in variables. He made his debut on 3 October as a half-time substitute in 4–2 league defeat against Sporting Gijón. On 27 October 2019, starting for the first time, Núñez scored first goal for his new club in a 3–2 home win against Extremadura with a penalty. He finished his only season at the Estadio de los Juegos Mediterráneos as the league's joint fourth top scorer with 16 goals, led by compatriot Cristhian Stuani. Núñez scored these 16 goals in twice as many appearances.

=== Benfica ===
On 4 September 2020, Núñez signed a five-year contract with Portuguese club Benfica, who paid a club record fee of €24 million for the player. This was also Almería's and the Segunda División's biggest transfer, with the club also receiving 20% of a future transfer.

==== 2020–2021: Adaptation to Portugal ====
Eleven days later, he made his debut for the club in a 2–1 loss against PAOK for the 2020–21 UEFA Champions League third qualifying round replacing Pedrinho in the 65th minute of the game. With his assist in a 3–0 win over Rio Ave on 18 October, he reached five assists in his first four league games, best in the league. On 22 October, he scored his first goals for the club with a hat-trick against Lech Poznań in a 4–2 away victory in a 2020–21 UEFA Europa League group stage match. Four days later, he scored his first Primeira Liga goal in a 2–0 home victory over B SAD. On 3 December, after three weeks off through a COVID-19 infection, he returned to action against Lech Poznań in the Europa League group stage, scoring Benfica's second goal in a 4–0 home victory. He struggled over the course of the season with the effects of COVID-19 and various injuries, and did not score for four months. He scored six league goals and provided ten assists – second-best in the league – helping Benfica to a third-place finish and qualification for the Champions League third qualifying round.

==== 2021–2022: Breakthrough and Bola de Prata ====
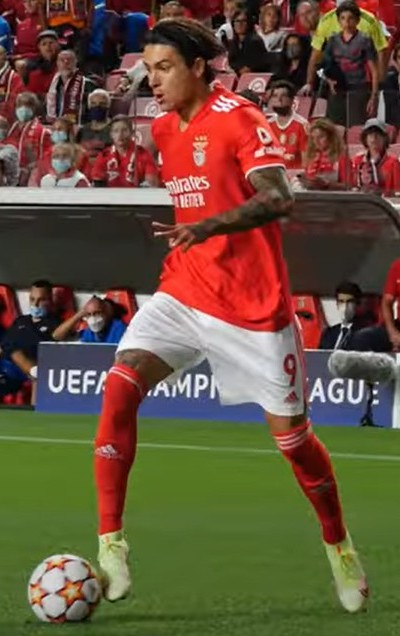
Núñez playing for Benfica in 2021

In May 2021, Núñez underwent surgery due to an injury on his right knee, forcing him to miss Benfica's first months of the new season. He made his return from injury on 21 August, replacing Everton in the 72nd minute, in a 2–0 away victory over Gil Vicente, being booked in the process. Following back-to-back braces against Santa Clara and Boavista in the Primeira Liga, he was named the league's Player of the Month and Forward of the Month for September. On 29 September, he scored his first two Champions League goals in a 3–0 home victory over Barcelona, and was named man of the match. On 27 November, he scored his first hat-trick in the league as his team finished the first half at B-SAD 7–0 up, though the game was abandoned early in the second half due to insufficient players on the COVID-affected host team. He added another treble on 12 December against Famalicão in a 4–1 away win, becoming the seventh player in the league to score back-to-back hat-tricks. Three days later, he scored two goals in a 3–0 home win over Sporting da Covilhã to send his team into the semi-finals of the 2021–22 Taça da Liga, though, while he was away on international duty for Uruguay, Benfica were defeated 2–1 by crosstown rivals Sporting CP in the 2022 Taça da Liga final.

On 27 February, Núñez scored his 20th league goal for Benfica in as many matches, in a 3–0 home victory against Vitória de Guimarães. On 15 March, in the second leg of Champions League round of 16, he scored the only goal of an away win over Ajax, securing a 3–2 aggregate win in the process. On 9 April, he scored his third hat-trick of the season in a 3–1 victory against B-SAD, bringing his total goal count for the season to 31 goals. He scored two goals against Liverpool in the 2021–22 Champions League quarter-finals: one in the first leg and the other in the second leg, while his team were eliminated 6–4 on aggregate. These games caught the eye of Jürgen Klopp, with the Liverpool manager stating that he believed that Núñez had a "big career ahead of him". His sixth goal of the campaign made him Benfica's all-time top scorer in modern Champions League history, surpassing Nuno Gomes' record of five goals set in the 1998–99 season. On 17 April, he scored a goal and provided an assist to help defeat the hosts Sporting 2–0 in the Lisbon derby, being named man of the match. In his last match for the club, on 7 May, Núñez scored a goal that was ruled out by VAR in a 1–0 home loss of O Clássico against rivals Porto, as they sealed the league title. He finished the season with 26 goals in 28 league games, being awarded the Bola de Prata award as top scorer of the Primeira Liga, being named in the Team of the Year and Player of the Year.

=== Liverpool ===
==== 2022–2023: Adaptation to England ====
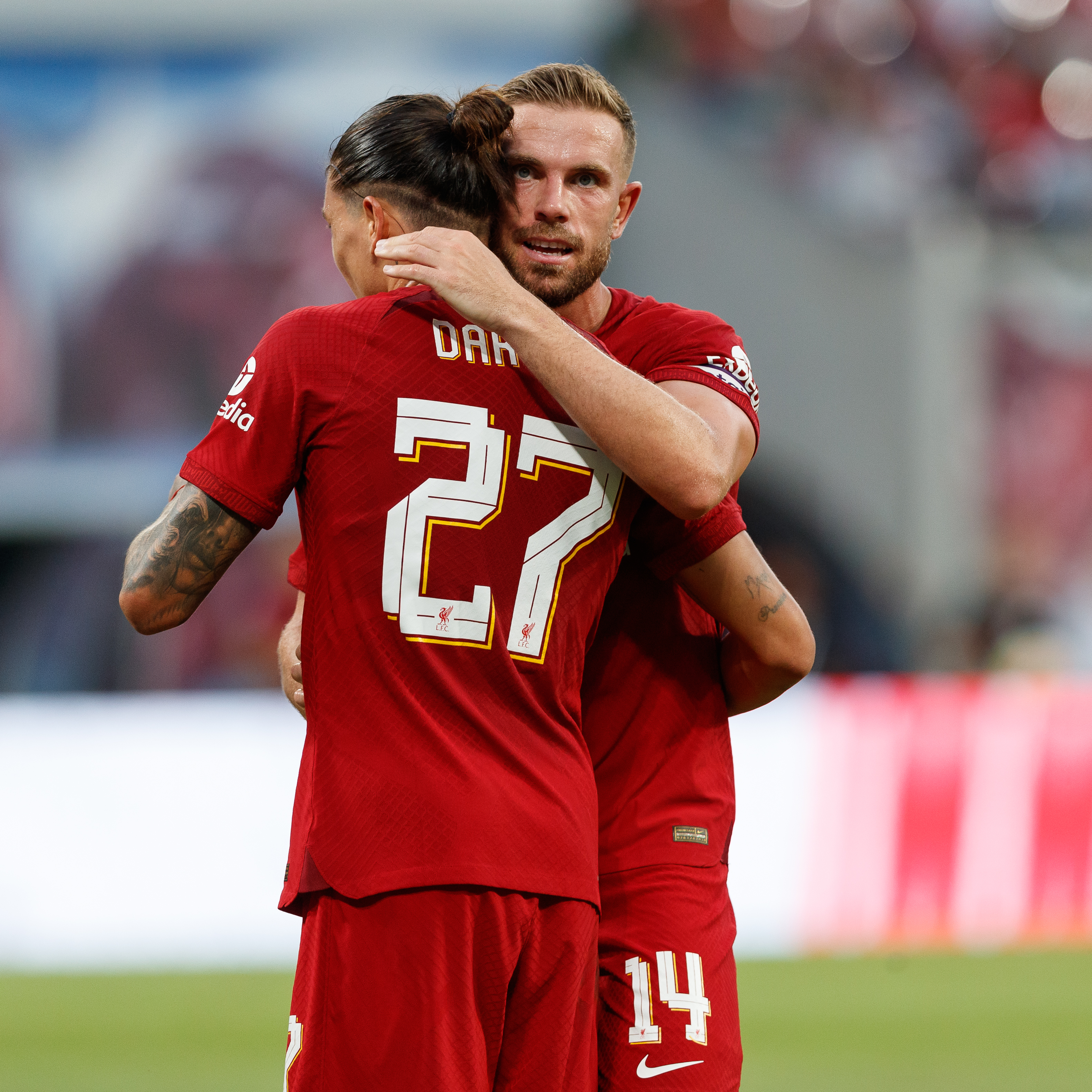
Núñez (left) celebrating a goal for Liverpool in 2022

On 13 June 2022, Benfica reached an agreement with Premier League club Liverpool for the transfer of Núñez for a €75 million fee plus €25 million in add-ons. The following day, the club confirmed the deal, for £64 million, with add-ons potentially taking the overall fee to £85 million at a later date, making him Liverpool's record transfer. On 30 July, Núñez made his debut for Liverpool in the club's 3–1 win over Manchester City in the FA Community Shield at the King Power Stadium. He won a penalty, which was converted by fellow forward Mohamed Salah, and scored his first goal for the club with a stooping header in the fourth minute of stoppage time. On 6 August, he scored his first league goal for Liverpool and provided an assist for Salah on his debut against Fulham, which ended in a 2–2 draw. During the following game, he was sent off for violent conduct in a 1–1 home draw against Crystal Palace, having headbutted opponent Joachim Andersen. On 12 October, Núñez scored his first Champions League goal for Liverpool in a 7–1 away win against Rangers. However, he received criticism during the first half of the season for missing a number of big chances in matches. He was named the Liverpool Player of the Month for November.

On 21 February 2023, Núñez scored Liverpool's first goal in a 5–2 home loss to Real Madrid with a flick between his legs in the first leg of Champions League round of 16. Owing to strong performances throughout the month, he was named the Liverpool Player of the Month again for February. Núñez's goal against Real Madrid was followed by a brace against Liverpool's rivals Manchester United in a 7–0 victory on 5 March. A minor toe injury disrupted some of Núñez's later game time, with Núñez missing out on three matches owing to this problem. Throughout the whole 2022–23 season, Núñez made 42 appearances and scored 15 goals in all competitions, nine of such goals coming in the Premier League, as Liverpool narrowly missed out on Champions League qualification. Goal called Núñez's season "mixed", noting that while he had "undoubtedly shown promise" he also had "plenty of flaws to iron out". However, Goal also recognised that Núñez had "certainly done enough to earn the love and support of the Reds [Liverpool] fans". Others argued that it was unfair to judge him on his first season, especially a season in which many Liverpool players suffered from lapses of form, with former Liverpool player Steve McManaman calling him a "work in progress". Núñez was described as a fan favourite at Liverpool after his first season; and a chant about him set to the tune of Alice Deejay's 'Better Off Alone' was popularised on social media.

==== 2023–2025: EFL Cup and Premier League ====
In the preseason of the upcoming 2023–24 season, Núñez was given the number 9, having previously worn the number 27. Núñez commented that he was "really happy" and "very proud" to wear the number 9, adding that "previously other players [had] represented" the number very well and that now it was his "turn to wear it". On 27 August 2023, Núñez replaced Alexis Mac Allister in the 77th minute in a match against Newcastle United where Liverpool were trailing by a goal and were reduced to 10 men. He scored in the 81st minute and again in the third minute of injury time, meaning that Liverpool won the game 2–1. On 21 September, Núñez scored Liverpool's first goal in the 2023–24 UEFA Europa League with a penalty against Austrian Bundesliga team LASK. On 1 November, he scored a curled goal against Bournemouth in the fourth round of the EFL Cup. On 10 January 2024, Núñez provided two assists for his teammates in an EFL Cup semi-final match against Fulham, causing him to rise to the position of Liverpool's top assist-maker in all competitions with 10.

On 21 January 2024, Núñez scored a brace against Bournemouth; his first goal was the 100th goal of his senior career for club and country, while his second made him the first Premier League player that season to register at least 10 goals and 10 assists in all competitions. On 28 January, Núñez scored against Norwich City in the fourth round proper of the FA Cup, becoming the first player in the 2023–24 season in Europe's top five leagues to reach double figures for both non-penalty goals and also assists in all competitions. On 17 February, Núñez scored his ninth Premier League goal of the season in a 4–1 victory against Brentford which equalled his Premier League goal tally from the previous season. However, he was withdrawn from this game injured at half-time and was later ruled out for the 2024 EFL Cup final, in which Liverpool defeated Chelsea. Núñez was praised as one of Liverpool's best performers throughout their EFL Cup campaign. On 2 March, he scored in the 99th minute of a 1–0 win over Nottingham Forest, which was Liverpool's latest winning Premier League goal since records began in 2006–07.

On 21 September 2024, Núñez scored his first goal of the season against Bournemouth, contributing to a 3–0 win. On 23 October, he scored his first Champions League goal of the season in a 1–0 away win against RB Leipzig. On 18 January 2025, Núñez scored a brace in the stoppage time to win the game against Brentford. In a season marked by limited playing time, Núñez regardless won his first Premier League title with Liverpool, becoming the second Uruguayan to achieve this feat following Diego Forlán.

=== Al-Hilal ===
On 9 August 2025, Núñez joined Saudi Pro League club Al-Hilal. The fee was reported to be €53 million without bonuses. A month later, on 13 September, he scored his first goal in a 2–2 draw with Al Qadsiah. Three days later, he netted a goal in a 2–1 victory over Al Duhail on his AFC Champions League Elite debut. On 13 February 2026, Núñez was omitted from Al-Hilal's league squad following the arrival of Karim Benzema, as foreign-player limits prevented his registration for the second half of the 2025–26 domestic season, although he remained eligible to play in the AFC Champions League Elite.

==== Loan to Al-Diriyah ====
On 22 August 2026, Núñez joined newly promoted fellow Saudi side Al-Diriyah on loan for the 2026–27 season.

== International career ==
=== Youth ===
Núñez is a former Uruguay youth international, and was part of under-20 team squad which finished third in 2019 South American U-20 Championship. He also took part in the 2019 FIFA U-20 World Cup, scoring in the opening match, a 3–1 over Norway. He scored the opening goal in a 2–0 win over New Zealand in the final group match, to help Uruguay finish top of Group C. His country was eliminated from the tournament following a 3–1 loss to Ecuador in the round of 16. Núñez was also in the under-22 team that finished in fourth place at 2019 Pan American Games in Peru, scoring in a 2–0 opening win over the hosts.

=== Senior ===
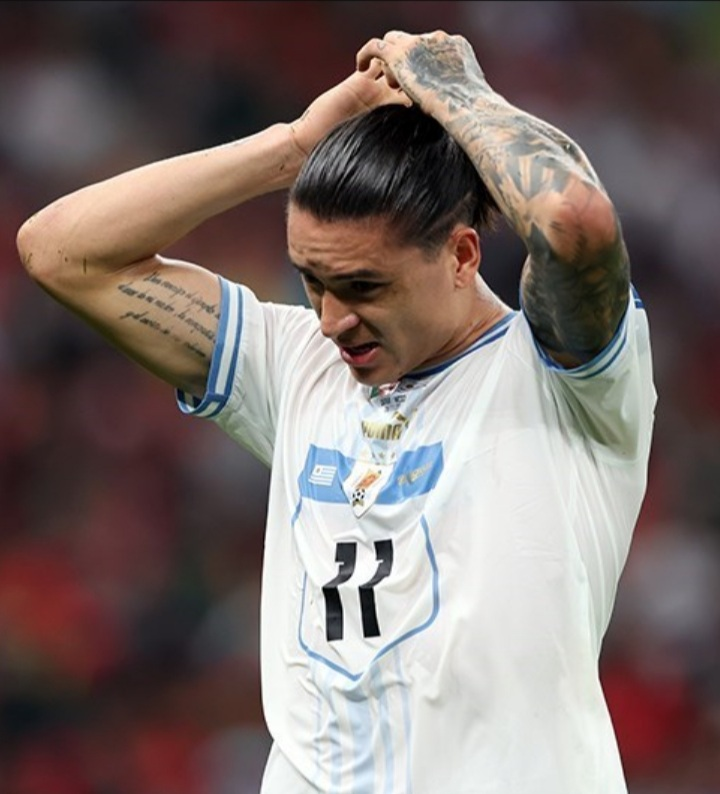
Núñez playing for Uruguay at the 2022 FIFA World Cup

Núñez was called up to the Uruguay senior team for friendlies against Costa Rica and the United States in September 2019. He made his international debut on 16 October in a 1–1 draw away to Peru in a friendly match, replacing Brian Lozano in the 75th minute of the game and scoring five minutes later. In June 2021, Núñez was included in the final 26-man Uruguay squad for the 2021 Copa América in Brazil. Due to a right knee injury that would rule him out for two months, he missed the tournament.

Núñez was selected in Uruguay's squad for the 2022 FIFA World Cup in Qatar. Uruguay were eliminated in the group stages of the tournament, after finishing below South Korea on goals scored. Núñez was lauded for his form in the qualifiers for the 2026 FIFA World Cup, scoring a stoppage-time equaliser in a 2–2 draw against Colombia on 13 October 2023, scoring and assisting in a 2–0 victory against Brazil on 18 October, scoring in a 2–0 victory against Argentina on 17 November, and scoring a brace in a 3–0 victory against Bolivia on 22 November. For this latter performance, compatriot Luis Suárez stated: "I have one of the best No. 9s in the world ahead of me." In June 2024, Núñez was called up to represent Uruguay at the 2024 Copa América in the United States. He scored his first international hat-trick in a 4–0 friendly win against Mexico shortly before the tournament.

== Player profile ==
=== Style of play ===
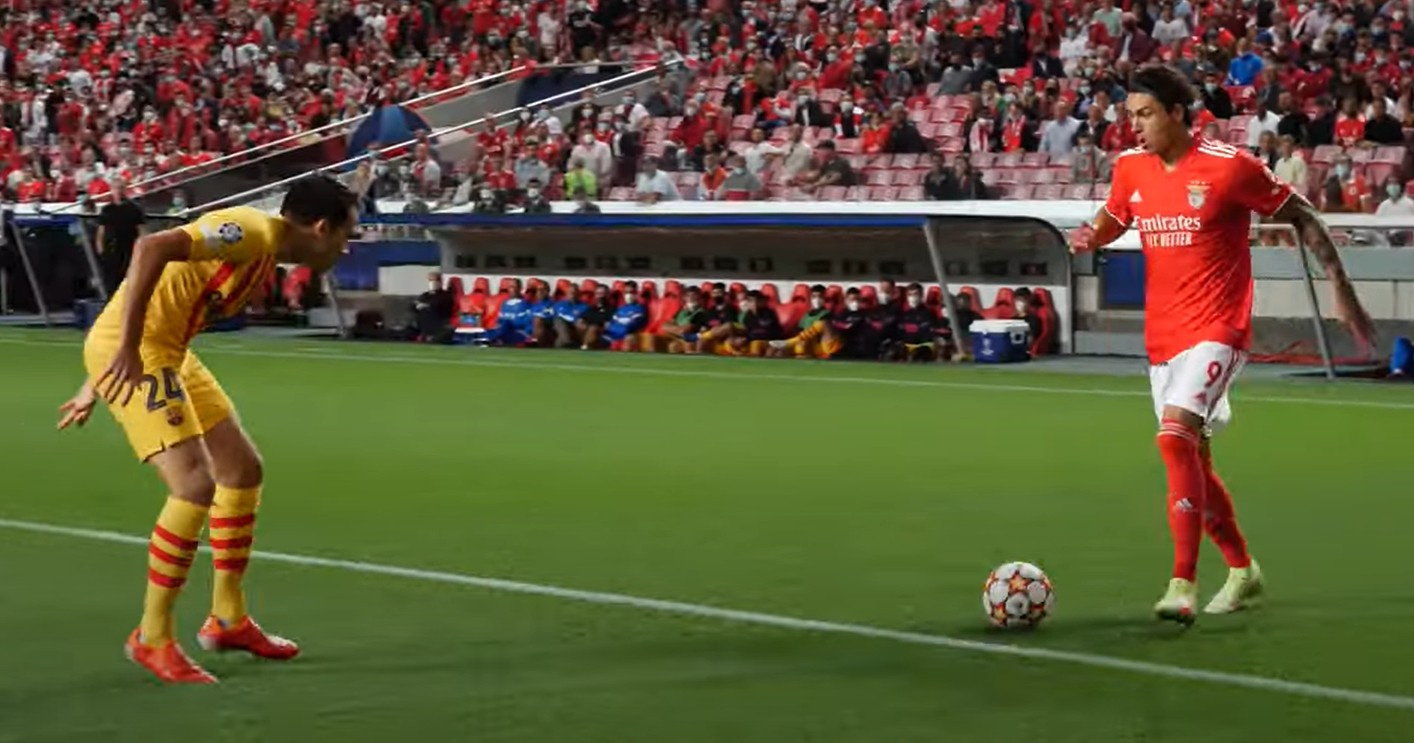
Núñez playing for Benfica in 2021

Núñez is a right-footed player and possesses an athletic frame; excellent acceleration and sprinting speed are the defining facets of his athletic skillset, with his change of pace giving him the ability to create immediate separation. He also has good awareness, he scans space and makes decisions when moving relative to the ball, space, team-mates and opponents. Núñez is a disruptive striker with a dynamic range of mobility who can carry counter-attacks, make incisive movements around the box and strike the ball explosively. He is adept at attacking open spaces and is good at generating shots from varied situations. He is also a promising creator around the box and is capable of playing as a left winger.

Núñez usually opts to rely on intelligent positioning and timing of runs in between defenders, especially in attacking the space between a fullback and centre-back at the backpost, often initially curving his run away from the centre-back before moving back infield. He often makes adjustments to his footwork to find space in the box and he also uses his body either to avoid a foul, but forcefully enough to arrive at a cross ahead of his marker. During his spell at Benfica, under Jorge Jesus and Nélson Veríssimo, Núñez played in a variety of positions and systems. He played as a striker and a left inside-forward in a 4–4–2 and 3–4–3 formations, with the responsibilities in these roles shifting on Benfica's ball possession or counter-attacking approaches for games. His ability to drift into the box and create space was a major part of his game, while also being aided by the presence of another striker (either Haris Seferovic or Gonçalo Ramos), which enabled Núñez to vacate his wide position to take up more positions in the penalty area.

=== Reception ===
Núñez's playing style has led him to be compared to fellow Uruguayan forward Diego Forlán, Edinson Cavani and Luis Suárez. In 2022, Jamie Carragher said: "I think he's got [similarities to] Fernando Torres. He's got that power, physically, to knock defenders off. And that blistering pace." In 2023, Lionel Messi called Núñez as an “excellent” player. The same year, Cristiano Ronaldo stated: "I like the likes of Haaland, Benzema, and Kane, but the Uruguayan playing for Liverpool is something special, I think. He's quick, strong, tall, and possesses a different skill set than the rest. Darwin Núñez". For his occasionally unpredictable style of football, Núñez has been referred to as the "Agent of Chaos".

Amongst Liverpool fans, Núñez quickly became a fan favourite. In June 2026, Núñez reportedly wished to rejoin the club, with fans approving.

== Personal life ==
Núñez and his partner Lorena Mañas announced the birth of their first child, a son, in January 2022. In addition to his native Spanish, Núñez also speaks Portuguese.

== Career statistics ==
=== Club ===
As of match played 30 October 2026

Appearances and goals by club, season and competition
| Club | Season | League | | | National cup (Note: Includes Copa del Rey, Taça de Portugal, FA Cup, King's Cup) | | League cup (Note: Includes Taça da Liga, EFL Cup) | | Continental | | Other | | Total | |
| Club | Season | Division | Apps | Goals | Apps | Goals | Apps | Goals | Apps | Goals | Apps | Goals | Apps | Goals |
|---|---|---|---|---|---|---|---|---|---|---|---|---|---|---|
| Peñarol | 2017 | Uruguayan Primera División | 1 | 0 | — | | — | | 0 | 0 | 0 | 0 | 1 | 0 |
| Peñarol | 2018 | Uruguayan Primera División | 10 | 1 | — | | — | | 2 (Note: Appearances in Copa Sudamericana) | 0 | 1 (Note: Appearance in Uruguayan Primera División championship play-off) | 0 | 13 | 1 |
| Peñarol | 2019 | Uruguayan Primera División | 3 | 3 | — | | — | | 5 (Note: Appearances in Copa Libertadores) | 0 | — | | 8 | 3 |
| Peñarol | Total | | 14 | 4 | 0 | 0 | 0 | 0 | 7 | 0 | 1 | 0 | 22 | 4 |
| Almería | 2019–20 | Segunda División | 30 | 16 | 0 | 0 | — | | — | | 2 (Note: Appearances in Segunda División play-offs) | 0 | 32 | 16 |
| Benfica | 2020–21 | Primeira Liga | 29 | 6 | 4 | 3 | 2 | 0 | 8 (Note: One appearance in UEFA Champions League, seven appearances and five goals in UEFA Europa League) | 5 | 1 (Note: Appearance in Supertaça Cândido de Oliveira) | 0 | 44 | 14 |
| Benfica | 2021–22 | Primeira Liga | 28 | 26 | 2 | 0 | 1 | 2 | 10 (Note: Appearances in UEFA Champions League) | 6 | — | | 41 | 34 |
| Benfica | Total | | 57 | 32 | 6 | 3 | 3 | 2 | 18 | 11 | 1 | 0 | 85 | 48 |
| Liverpool | 2022–23 | Premier League | 29 | 9 | 2 | 1 | 2 | 0 | 8 | 4 | 1 (Note: Appearance in FA Community Shield) | 1 | 42 | 15 |
| Liverpool | 2023–24 | Premier League | 36 | 11 | 3 | 1 | 5 | 1 | 10 (Note: Appearances in UEFA Europa League) | 5 | — | | 54 | 18 |
| Liverpool | 2024–25 | Premier League | 30 | 5 | 2 | 0 | 6 | 1 | 9 | 1 | — | | 47 | 7 |
| Liverpool | Total | | 95 | 25 | 7 | 2 | 13 | 2 | 27 | 10 | 1 | 1 | 143 | 40 |
| Al-Hilal | 2025–26 | Saudi Pro League | 16 | 6 | 2 | 0 | — | | 6 (Note: Appearances in AFC Champions League Elite) | 3 | — | | 24 | 9 |
| Al-Diriyah (loan) | 2026–27 | Saudi Pro League | 10 | 3 | — | | — | | — | | — | | 10 | 3 |
| Career total | | | 222 | 84 | 15 | 5 | 16 | 4 | 58 | 24 | 5 | 1 | 316 | 120 |

=== International ===
As of match played 17 November 2026

Appearances and goals by national team and year
| National team | Year | Apps | Goals |
|---|---|---|---|
| Uruguay | 2019 | 1 | 1 |
| Uruguay | 2020 | 3 | 1 |
| Uruguay | 2021 | 2 | 0 |
| Uruguay | 2022 | 10 | 1 |
| Uruguay | 2023 | 6 | 5 |
| Uruguay | 2024 | 11 | 5 |
| Uruguay | 2025 | 3 | 0 |
| Uruguay | 2026 | 10 | 3 |
| Total | | 46 | 16 |

Scores and results list Uruguay's goal tally first, score column indicates score after each Núñez goal.

List of international goals scored by Darwin Núñez
| No. | Date | Venue | Cap | Opponent | Score | Result | Competition | Ref. |
|---|---|---|---|---|---|---|---|---|
| 1 | 16 October 2019 | National Stadium of Peru, Lima, Peru | 1 | Peru | 1–1 | 1–1 | Friendly | |
| 2 | 13 November 2020 | Estadio Metropolitano Roberto Meléndez, Barranquilla, Colombia | 3 | Colombia | 3–0 | 3–0 | 2022 FIFA World Cup qualification | |
| 3 | 27 September 2022 | Tehelné pole, Bratislava, Slovakia | 13 | Canada | 2–0 | 2–0 | Friendly | |
| 4 | 12 October 2023 | Estadio Metropolitano Roberto Meléndez, Barranquilla, Colombia | 19 | Colombia | 2–2 | 2–2 | 2026 FIFA World Cup qualification | |
| 5 | 17 October 2023 | Estadio Centenario, Montevideo, Uruguay | 20 | Brazil | 1–0 | 2–0 | 2026 FIFA World Cup qualification | |
| 6 | 16 November 2023 | La Bombonera, Buenos Aires, Argentina | 21 | Argentina | 2–0 | 2–0 | 2026 FIFA World Cup qualification | |
| 7 | 21 November 2023 | Estadio Centenario, Montevideo, Uruguay | 22 | Bolivia | 1–0 | 3–0 | 2026 FIFA World Cup qualification | |
| 8 | 21 November 2023 | Estadio Centenario, Montevideo, Uruguay | 22 | Bolivia | 3–0 | 3–0 | 2026 FIFA World Cup qualification | |
| 9 | 5 June 2024 | Empower Field at Mile High, Denver, United States | 23 | Mexico | 1–0 | 4–0 | Friendly | |
| 10 | 5 June 2024 | Empower Field at Mile High, Denver, United States | 23 | Mexico | 3–0 | 4–0 | Friendly | |
| 11 | 5 June 2024 | Empower Field at Mile High, Denver, United States | 23 | Mexico | 4–0 | 4–0 | Friendly | |
| 12 | 23 June 2024 | Hard Rock Stadium, Miami Gardens, United States | 24 | Panama | 2–0 | 3–1 | 2024 Copa América | |
| 13 | 27 June 2024 | MetLife Stadium, East Rutherford, United States | 25 | Bolivia | 2–0 | 5–0 | 2024 Copa América | |
| 14 | 28 September 2026 | Seoul World Cup Stadium, Seoul, South Korea | 43 | South Korea | 1–0 | 4–1 | Friendly | |
| 15 | 28 September 2026 | Seoul World Cup Stadium, Seoul, South Korea | 43 | South Korea | 4–0 | 4–1 | Friendly | |

== Honours ==
Peñarol

- Uruguayan Primera División: 2017, 2018

Benfica

- Taça de Portugal runner-up: 2020–21
- Taça da Liga runner-up: 2021–22

Liverpool

- Premier League: 2024–25
- EFL Cup: 2023–24; runner-up: 2024–25
- FA Community Shield: 2022

Uruguay

- Copa América third place: 2024

Individual

- Cosme Damião Awards – Footballer of the Year: 2021
- Primeira Liga Player of the Month: September 2021
- Primeira Liga Team of the Year: 2021–22
- LPFP Primeira Liga Player of the Year: 2021–22
- SJPF Player of the Month: April 2022
- Primeira Liga Top Scorer: 2021–22
- CNID Footballer of the Year: 2022
- IFFHS Men's CONMEBOL Team: 2023
