= 2017–18 PFC CSKA Sofia season =

CSKA Sofia
2017–18 season
- Controlling owner: Grisha Ganchev
- Manager: Stamen Belchev (until 1 May 2018); Hristo Yanev (since 1 May 2018)
- Parva Liga: Second place
- Bulgarian Cup: Semi-final
Home colours	Away colours	Third colours

The 2017–18 season is CSKA Sofia's 69th season in the Bulgarian A Football Group and their second consecutive participation after their administrative relegation in the third division due to mounting financial troubles. This article shows player statistics and all matches (official and friendly) that the club will play during the 2017–18 season.

== Players ==
=== Squad stats ===
No.	Pos.	Nat.	Name	Totals		Parva Liga		Bulgarian Cup		Discipline	
No.	Pos.	Nat.	Name	Apps	Goals	Apps	Goals	Apps	Goals	Yellow card	Red card
1	GK	(Bulgaria) BUL	Slavi Petrov	0	0	0	0	0	0	0	0
2	DF	(Bulgaria) BUL	Stoycho Atanasov	12	0	8	0	4	0	9	0
3	DF	(Brazil) BRA	Geferson	14	0	13	0	1	0	4	2
4	DF	(Bulgaria) BUL	Bozhidar Chorbadzhiyski	30	4	27	4	3	0	4	0
5	DF	(Bulgaria) BUL	Nikolay Bodurov	38	3	32+1	2	3+2	1	8	0
6	MF	(Portugal) POR	Rúben Pinto	31	4	23+4	4	3+1	0	5	0
7	FW	(Colombia) COL	Jean Carlos Blanco	15	4	5+8	3	1+1	1	1	0
8	MF	(Ghana) GHA	Edwin Gyasi	12	1	4+6	1	1+1	0	1	0
9	FW	(Brazil) BRA	Fernando Karanga	30	25	27	24	2+1	1	11	1
10	MF	(Netherlands) NED	Roland Alberg	13	5	8+3	4	0+2	1	3	0
11	DF	(Bulgaria) BUL	Stanislav Manolev	31	4	27+2	4	1+1	0	7	0
11	MF	(Bulgaria) BUL	Daniel Yordanov	1	0	0+1	0	0	0	0	0
12	GK	(Bulgaria) BUL	Georgi Kitanov	4	-4	2	-2	2	-2	0	0
14	FW	(Portugal) POR	Ukra	1	0	0+1	0	0	0	0	0
14	FW	(Bulgaria) BUL	Ivan Mitrev	1	0	0+1	0	0	0	0	0
15	MF	(Bulgaria) BUL	Kristiyan Malinov	32	2	28+1	2	3	0	12	0
16	MF	(Cameroon) CMR	Raoul Loé	30	2	14+11	2	4+1	0	5	0
17	FW	(Brazil) BRA	Henrique	26	4	17+5	4	4	0	3	0
18	MF	(Bulgaria) BUL	Aleksandar Georgiev	15	1	4+9	1	1+1	0	0	0
19	FW	(Bulgaria) BUL	Kiril Despodov	33	11	19+11	8	2+1	3	5	0
20	MF	(Portugal) POR	Tiago Rodrigues	37	9	31+3	9	3	0	3	0
23	DF	(Bulgaria) BUL	Aleksandar Dyulgerov	22	0	17+3	0	2	0	5	0
24	MF	(Bulgaria) BUL	Nikolay Yankov	1	0	0+1	0	0	0	0	0
25	DF	(France) FRA	Alexandre Barthe	20	1	13+3	1	4	0	2	0
26	DF	(Bulgaria) BUL	Valentin Antov	4	0	3+1	0	0	0	3	0
27	FW	(Bulgaria) BUL	Radoslav Zhivkov	0	0	0	0	0	0	0	0
30	GK	(Lithuania) LTU	Vytautas Černiauskas	37	-29	34	-24	3	-5	1	0
Players sold or loaned out after the start of the season:
3	DF	(Bulgaria) BUL	Anton Nedyalkov	21	0	19	0	2	0	3	0
7	FW	(Ecuador) ECU	Kevin Mercado	18	1	7+8	1	1+2	0	3	1
10	MF	(Portugal) POR	David Simão	2	0	2	0	0	0	0	0
10	MF	(Colombia) COL	Gustavo Culma	17	2	9+6	2	1+1	0	2	0
21	FW	(Republic of the Congo) CGO	Kévin Koubemba	14	5	2+10	1	2	4	0	0
22	MF	(Bulgaria) BUL	Nikola Kolev	2	0	0+2	0	0	0	0	0
25	FW	(Bulgaria) BUL	Tonislav Yordanov	0	0	0	0	0	0	0	0
28	DF	(Bulgaria) BUL	Plamen Galabov	1	0	0+1	0	0	0	0	0
29	FW	(Bulgaria) BUL	Milcho Angelov	5	0	0+3	0	2	0	0	0
	DF	(Bulgaria) BUL	Angel Lyaskov	0	0	0	0	0	0	0	0

As of 20 May 2018

== Players in/out ==
=== Summer transfers ===
In: Note: Flags indicate national team as defined under FIFA eligibility rules; some limited exceptions apply. Players may hold more than one non-FIFA nationality.

No.	Pos.	Nation	Player
1	GK	BUL	Slavi Petrov (from CSKA Sofia U19)
6	MF	POR	Rúben Pinto (from (Portugal) Belenenses, previously on loan)
16	MF	CMR	Raoul Loé (from (Spain) Osasuna)
17	FW	BRA	Henrique (from (Brazil) Atlético Mineiro, previously on loan at (Brazil) Grêmio Novorizontino)
20	MF	POR	Tiago Rodrigues (from (Portugal) Porto B, previously on loan at (Portugal) Nacional)
25	DF	FRA	Alexandre Barthe (from (Romania) Universitatea Craiova)
25	FW	BUL	Tonislav Yordanov (from CSKA Sofia U19)
27	FW	BUL	Radoslav Zhivkov (from CSKA Sofia U19)
30	GK	LTU	Vytautas Černiauskas (from (Romania) Dinamo București)
—	DF	BUL	Angel Lyaskov (from CSKA Sofia U19)

Out: Note: Flags indicate national team as defined under FIFA eligibility rules; some limited exceptions apply. Players may hold more than one non-FIFA nationality.

No.	Pos.	Nation	Player
5	DF	BUL	Martin Simeonov (to Litex Lovech)
10	MF	POR	David Simão (to (Portugal) Boavista)
10	MF	POR	Arsénio (to (Portugal) Moreirense)
10	MF	BUL	Rumen Rumenov (to Etar Veliko Tarnovo)
16	MF	BUL	Krasimir Stanoev (to Dunav Ruse)
20	MF	CMR	Petrus Boumal (to (Russia) Ural Yekaterinburg)
21	FW	POR	Rui Pedro (to (Hungary) Ferencvárosi TC)
22	MF	BUL	Nikola Kolev (on loan at Etar Veliko Tarnovo)
25	MF	BUL	Petar Vitanov (to Vereya Stara Zagora)
25	FW	BUL	Tonislav Yordanov (on loan at Litex Lovech)
26	MF	BUL	Georgi Tartov (to Litex Lovech)
27	FW	BUL	Georgi Minchev (on loan at Tsarsko Selo Sofia, previously on loan)
28	DF	BUL	Plamen Galabov (loaned at Etar Veliko Tarnovo)
30	GK	BUL	Aleksandar Konov (to Dunav Ruse)
—	DF	BUL	Galin Minkov (on loan at Tsarsko Selo Sofia, previously on loan)
—	DF	BUL	Ivan Turitsov (to Litex Lovech)
—	DF	BUL	Emil Petrov (to Litex Lovech, previously on loan at Spartak Pleven)
—	DF	BUL	Angel Lyaskov (on loan at Litex Lovech)
—	MF	BUL	Reyan Daskalov (on loan at Tsarsko Selo Sofia, previously on loan)
—	DF	BUL	Vasil Popov (Released, previously on loan at Tsarsko Selo Sofia)

=== Winter transfers ===
In: Note: Flags indicate national team as defined under FIFA eligibility rules; some limited exceptions apply. Players may hold more than one non-FIFA nationality.

No.	Pos.	Nation	Player
3	DF	BRA	Geferson (from (Brazil) Internacional)
7	FW	COL	Jean Carlos Blanco (from (Colombia) La Equidad)
8	MF	GHA	Edwin Gyasi (from (Norway) Aalesunds)
10	MF	NED	Roland Alberg (from (United States) Philadelphia Union)
14	MF	POR	Ukra (from (Saudi Arabia) Al-Fateh)

Out: Note: Flags indicate national team as defined under FIFA eligibility rules; some limited exceptions apply. Players may hold more than one non-FIFA nationality.

No.	Pos.	Nation	Player
3	DF	BUL	Anton Nedyalkov (to (United States) FC Dallas)
7	FW	ECU	Kevin Mercado (loan return to (Spain) Granada)
10	MF	COL	Gustavo Culma (to (Mexico) Club Necaxa)
21	FW	CGO	Kévin Koubemba (to (France) Bourg-en-Bresse)
29	FW	BUL	Milcho Angelov (to Slavia Sofia)

== Pre-season and friendlies ==
Win Draw Loss Fixtures

=== Pre-season ===
18 June 2017 45 min Friendly	CSKA (Bulgaria)	3–1	(Austria) Wacker Innsbruck	Fulpmes, Austria
18:00 EEST	Koubemba 36'; Karanga 42'; Malinov 45'	Report	Eler 39'	Stadium: Sportplatz Fulpmes

18 June 2017 45 min Friendly	CSKA (Bulgaria)	2–0	(Azerbaijan) Gabala	Fulpmes, Austria
20:00 EEST	Nedyalkov 4'; Koubemba 44'	Report		Stadium: Sportplatz Fulpmes

21 June 2017 Friendly	CSKA (Bulgaria)	2–1	(Russia) Zenit Saint Petersburg	Going am Wilden Kaiser, Austria
19:00 EEST	Karanga 45'; Mercado 64'	Report	Panyukov 16'	Stadium: Sportplatz Going

23 June 2017 Friendly	CSKA (Bulgaria)	4–2	(Romania) Universitatea Craiova	Wörgl, Austria
19:00 EEST	Angelov 31'; Kolev 38'; Malinov 73'; Simão 88'	Report	Ivan 3', 20'	Stadium: Sportzentrum Wörgl

24 June 2017 Friendly	CSKA (Bulgaria)	5–2	(Azerbaijan) Qarabağ	Kössen, Austria
19:00 EEST	Karanga 14', 59'; Yunuszade 29' (o.g.); Malinov 33'; Despodov 44'	Report	Ramazanov 55'; Ndlovu 75'	Stadium: Sportplatz Kössen

1 July 2017 Friendly	CSKA	2–0	Etar	Sofia
19:30 EEST	Despodov 17'; Pinto 38'	Report		Stadium: Sporten kompleks Pancharevo

7 July 2017 Friendly	CSKA	1–0	Beroe	Sofia
20:00 EEST	Karanga 39'	Report		Stadium: Stadion Balgarska Armiya; Attendance: 5,000

26 July 2017 Friendly	CSKA	7–4	Tsarsko Selo	Sofia
10:00 EEST	Koubemba 6', 14', 31'; Culma 10', 54'; Kolev 73'; Angelov 78'	Report	Okechukwu 4'; Katsarov 27'; Tsakovski 50', 51'	Stadium: Sporten kompleks Pancharevo

=== On-season (autumn) ===
2 September 2017 Friendly	CSKA	3–1	Maritsa	Sofia
11:00 EEST	Angelov 7', 71'; Koubemba 60'	Report	Karamatev 56'	Stadium: Sporten kompleks Pancharevo

6 October 2017 Friendly	CSKA	3−1	Montana	Sofia
11:00 EEST	Karanga 39'; Tsonkov 60' (o.g.); Antov 65'		S. Georgiev 26'	Stadium: Sporten kompleks Pancharevo

=== Mid-season ===
20 January 2018 Friendly	CSKA	2−0	Vihren	Sandanski
13:00 EET	Blanco 56'; Alberg 61'	Report		Stadium: Stadion Sandanski; Attendance: 3,000

24 January 2018 Friendly	CSKA (Bulgaria)	8−0	(China) Jiangsu Suning	Marbella, Spain
17:00 EET	Despodov 17', 65' (pen.), 68'; Karanga 36'; Alberg 42'; Zhivkov 84'; Atanasov 88'; Manolev 90' (pen.)	Report		Stadium: La Dama de Noche

27 January 2018 Friendly	CSKA (Bulgaria)	0−0	(Ukraine) Dynamo Kyiv	Marbella, Spain
13:00 EET		Report		Stadium: Marbella Football Center

31 January 2018 Friendly	CSKA (Bulgaria)	0−0	(Russia) Spartak Moscow	La Línea, Spain
18:30 EET		Report		Stadium: Estadio Municipal

2 February 2018 Friendly	CSKA (Bulgaria)	1−1	(China) Tianjin Teda	Sotogrande, Spain
17:00 EET	Karanga 7'	Report	Johnathan 27'	Stadium: Santa María Polo Club

10 February 2018 Friendly	CSKA	2−1	Tsarsko Selo	Sofia
13:00 EET	Karanga 52'; Blanco 76'	Report	Dikov 33'	Stadium: Stadion Balgarska Armiya; Attendance: 1,000

=== On-season (spring) ===
24 March 2018 Friendly	CSKA	2−3	Strumska Slava	Sofia
11:00 EEST	Blanco 6' (pen.); Alberg 67'	Report	Karaneychev 35'; Tasev 52', 54'	Stadium: Sporten kompleks Pancharevo

== Competitions ==
=== Parva Liga ===
==== Regular season ====
===== League table =====
Pos	Team	Pld	W	D	L	GF	GA	GD	Pts	Qualification
1	Ludogorets Razgrad	26	21	3	2	63	13	+50	66	Qualification for the Championship round
2	CSKA Sofia	26	19	6	1	59	14	+45	63	Qualification for the Championship round
3	Levski Sofia	26	14	8	4	37	14	+23	50	Qualification for the Championship round
4	Beroe	26	12	9	5	33	24	+9	45	Qualification for the Championship round
5	Botev Plovdiv	26	11	9	6	44	29	+15	42	Qualification for the Championship round

Source: Soccerway
Rules for classification: 1) Points; 2) Head-to-head points; 3) Head-to-head goal difference; 4) Head-to-head goals scored; 5) Head-to-head away goals scored (only if two teams); 6) Goal difference; 7) Goals scored; 8) Fairplay ranking; 9) Draw.

===== Results summary =====
Overall								Home						Away					
Pld	W	D	L	GF	GA	GD	Pts	W	D	L	GF	GA	GD	W	D	L	GF	GA	GD
26	19	6	1	59	14	+45	63	9	3	1	29	5	+24	10	3	0	30	9	+21

Last updated: 18 March 2018.
Source: See results

===== Results by round =====
Round	1	2	3	4	5	6	7	8	9	10	11	12	13	14	15	16	17	18	19	20	21	22	23	24	25	26
Ground	A	H	A	H	A	H	A	H	A	H	A	H	A	H	A	H	A	H	A	H	A	H	A	H	A	H
Result	D	L	W	W	W	W	W	W	W	W	D	D	D	W	W	D	W	W	W	W	W	D	W	W	W	W
Position	5	11	5	4	2	3	1	1	1	1	2	2	2	2	2	2	2	2	2	2	2	2	2	2	2	2

Source: See Results
A = Away; H = Home; W = Win; D = Draw; L = Loss

===== Results =====
15 July 2017 1	Slavia	1−1	CSKA	Sofia
21:00 EEST	Papoutsogiannopoulos (yellow card) 41'; Velev (yellow card) 47'; Uzunov (yellow card) 50'; Dimitrov 62'; Yomov (yellow card) 62'; Petkov (yellow card) 85'	Report	Karanga 28'; Manolev (yellow card) 62'; Malinov (yellow card) 70'; Despodov (yellow card) 78'	Stadium: Natsionalen stadion Vasil Levski; Attendance: 3,800; Referee: Stefan Apostolov (Simitli)

22 July 2017 2	CSKA	0−1	Ludogorets	Sofia
21:00 EEST	Manolev (yellow card) 9'; Malinov (yellow card) 39'; Karanga (yellow card) 41'; Mercado (yellow card) 45+2' (yellow-red card) 58'; Nedyalkov (yellow card) 55'; Chorbadzhiyski (yellow card) 90+2'	Report	Misidjan (yellow card) 32', (goal) 49'; Lukoki (yellow card) 55'; Quixadá (yellow card) 65'; Broun (yellow card) 76'; Natanael (yellow card) 88'; Dyakov (yellow card) 90'	Stadium: Stadion Balgarska Armiya; Attendance: 7,300; Referee: Ivaylo Stoyanov (Petrich)

30 July 2017 3	Botev	2−6	CSKA	Plovdiv
18:45 EEST	Dimov (yellow card) 6'; Genev (yellow card) 21'; Stoyanov (yellow card) 35'; Baltanov 39', (yellow card) 48'; Minev (yellow card) 53' (yellow-red card) 54'; Kossoko 75'	Report	Karanga 13', 61' (pen.), 69'; Malinov (yellow card) 20'; Tiago 30'; Despodov 84', 90+1'	Stadium: Futbolen complex Botev 1912; Attendance: 3,000; Referee: Valentin Zhelezov (Burgas)

6 August 2017 4	CSKA	4−1	Lokomotiv	Sofia
20:00 EEST	Tiago 13'; Malinov 27'; Karanga 61'; Manolev 78'	Report	Nikolov (yellow card) 27'; Bakalov (yellow card) 45+2', (goal) 74'	Stadium: Stadion Balgarska Armiya; Attendance: 3,150; Referee: Nikola Popov (Sofia)

11 August 2017 5	Septemvri	0−1	CSKA	Sofia
21:00 EEST	Baidoo (yellow card) 37' (yellow-red card) 64'; Galchev (yellow card) 45+2'	Report	Pinto 44'	Stadium: Natsionalen stadion Vasil Levski; Attendance: 1,400; Referee: Stefan Apostolov (Simitli)

19 August 2017 6	CSKA	6−1	Vitosha	Sofia
21:00 EEST	Chorbadzhiyski 5', 39'; Karanga 13'; Tiago 54'; Atanasov (yellow card) 67'; Pinto 78'; Koubemba 90'	Report	Tsankov (yellow card) 44'; Dolapchiev 61'	Stadium: Stadion Balgarska Armiya; Attendance: 1,640; Referee: Stanislav Stavrov (Veliko Tarnovo)

26 August 2017 7	Beroe	0−3	CSKA	Stara Zagora
18:45 EEST	Vidanov (yellow card) 37'	Report	Kato 27' (o.g.); Malinov (yellow card) 36'; Karanga 57', (yellow card) 58'; Bodurov 67'; Pinto (yellow card) 74'	Stadium: Stadion Beroe; Attendance: 7,200; Referee: Nikola Popov (Sofia)

8 September 2017 8	CSKA	3−0	Vereya	Sofia
20:00 EEST	Culma 7', 37'; Karanga 67'	Report	Enchev (yellow card) 42'; Vitanov (yellow card) 60'; Panov (yellow card) 78'	Stadium: Stadion Balgarska Armiya; Attendance: 3,100; Referee: Dragomir Draganov (Varna)

16 September 2017 9	Cherno More	0−1	CSKA	Varna
20:00 EEST	Chunchukov (yellow card) 83' (yellow-red card) 85'; Borovyk (yellow card) 89'	Report	Karanga (yellow card) 6', (goal) 90+6'; Bodurov (yellow card) 44'	Stadium: Stadion Ticha; Attendance: 6,500; Referee: Stefan Apostolov (Simitli)

22 September 2017 10	CSKA	3−0	Dunav	Sofia
20:00 EEST	Karanga 56'; Bodurov 69'; Tiago 73'; Nedyalkov (yellow card) 85'	Report	Budinov (yellow card) 25'; Vasev (yellow card) 34'; Milchev (yellow card) 55'	Stadium: Stadion Balgarska Armiya; Attendance: 1,800; Referee: Petar Dorovski (Sofia)

30 September 2017 11	Etar	2−2	CSKA	Veliko Tarnovo
14:45 EEST	Minev (yellow card) 23'; Badará 32'; Atanasov (yellow card) 35'; Apostolov (yellow card) 82'; Pehlivanov (yellow card) 83'; Pinto 85' (o.g.); Petkov (yellow card) 90+3'; Kyamil (yellow card) 90+9'	Report	Karanga 30', 62'; Dyulgerov (yellow card) 45'	Stadium: Stadion Ivaylo; Attendance: 9,300; Referee: Valentin Zhelezov (Burgas)

15 October 2017 12	CSKA	0−0	Pirin	Sofia
20:00 EEST	Tiago (yellow card) 38'	Report	Popev (yellow card) 29'; Nichev (yellow card) 51'; Souda (yellow card) 75'	Stadium: Stadion Balgarska Armiya; Attendance: 2,900; Referee: Angel Angelov (Sofia)

21 October 2017 13	Levski	2−2	CSKA	Sofia
16:00 EEST	Jablonský 5'; Vutov (yellow card) 22'; Panayotov (yellow card) 27'; Eyjólfsson (yellow card) 35'; Procházka 61'; Goranov (yellow card) 74'	Report	Tiago 12', 15'; Malinov (yellow card) 23'; Nedyalkov (yellow card) 55'; Karanga (yellow card) 68'; Bodurov (yellow card) 86'	Stadium: Natsionalen stadion Vasil Levski; Attendance: 25,107; Referee: Georgi Kabakov (Plovdiv)

28 October 2017 14	CSKA	1−0	Slavia	Sofia
17:30 EEST	Tiago 24'; Pinto (yellow card) 42'	Report	Mbah (yellow card) 8'; Omar (yellow card) 14'; Velev (yellow card) 44'; Ivanov (yellow card) 45'; K. Velkov (yellow card) 79'	Stadium: Stadion Balgarska Armiya; Attendance: 910; Referee: Georgi Dimitrov (Sofia)

5 November 2017 15	Ludogorets	1−2	CSKA	Razgrad
18:00 EET	Campanharo 49'; Lukoki (yellow card) 52'; Natanael (yellow card) 87'; Keșerü (yellow card) 90+1'	Report	Atanasov (yellow card) 1'; Culma (yellow card) 16'; Karanga (yellow card) 56' (yellow-red card) 68', (goal) 58'; Mercado 71'; Černiauskas (yellow card) 90+3'; Dyulgerov (yellow card) 90+5'	Stadium: Ludogorets Arena; Attendance: 5,700; Referee: Dragomir Draganov (Varna)

18 November 2017 16	CSKA	1−1	Botev	Sofia
15:00 EET	Bodurov (yellow card) 22'; Marin 79' (o.g.); Malinov (yellow card) 90+3'	Report	Nedelev 23' (pen.); N'Dongala (yellow card) 55'; Sauer (yellow card) 86'; Brisola (yellow card) 87'	Stadium: Stadion Balgarska Armiya; Attendance: 3,010; Referee: Volen Chinkov (Sofia)

26 November 2017 17	Lokomotiv	0−1	CSKA	Plovdiv
15:30 EET	Krumov (yellow card) 21'; Frikeche (yellow card) 61'	Report	Malinov (yellow card) 30'; Despodov 35'	Stadium: Stadion Lokomotiv; Attendance: 2,830; Referee: Angel Angelov (Sofia)
Note: The match was interrupted in the 42nd minute for about 21 minutes due to a pitch invasion and mass brawl between CSKA and Lokomotiv fans. Both clubs were suspended to play their next two home games under closed doors.

30 November 2017 18	CSKA	2−0	Septemvri	Sofia
17:30 EET	Karanga 26' (pen.), (yellow card) 73'; Despodov 55'	Report		Stadium: Stadion Balgarska Armiya; Attendance: closed-door Referee: Petar Kostadinov (Dobrich)

3 December 2017 19	Vitosha	0−2	CSKA	Sofia
17:30 EET		Report	Loé 42'; Despodov 88'	Stadium: Natsionalen stadion Vasil Levski; Attendance: 980; Referee: Stanislav Stavrov (Veliko Tarnovo)

10 December 2017 20	CSKA	6−0	Beroe	Sofia
17:00 EET	Despodov 11'; Dyulgerov (yellow card) 17'; Karanga 43', 45+2', 52'; Tiago 78'; Manolev 88'	Report	Kamburov (yellow card) 26'	Stadium: Stadion Balgarska Armiya; Attendance: closed-door Referee: Ivaylo Stoyanov (Petrich)

17 February 2018 21	Vereya	0−5	CSKA	Stara Zagora
15:00 EET	Valchev (yellow card) 12'; V. Minev (yellow card) 23'; Tanev (yellow card) 32'; Domovchiyski (yellow card) 35'; Bengyuzov (yellow card) 54'	Report	Karanga 3', 62'; Henrique 16', (yellow card) 53'; Despodov (yellow card) 61'; Tiago (yellow card) 65'; Loé (yellow card) 66'; Alberg 78'; Blanco 89'	Stadium: Trace Arena; Attendance: 3,200; Referee: Ivaylo Stoyanov (Petrich)

23 February 2018 22	CSKA	0−0	Cherno More	Sofia
17:30 EET	Tiago (yellow card) 64'	Report	Dimov (yellow card) 31'; Kuzma (yellow card) 63'; Makendzhiev (yellow card) 90+3'	Stadium: Stadion Balgarska Armiya; Attendance: 1,900; Referee: Angel Angelov (Sofia)

5 March 2018 23	Dunav	0−2	CSKA	Ruse
15:00 EET	Karageren (yellow card) 31'; Vasev (yellow card) 38'; Shopov (yellow card) 38'; Kovachev (yellow card) 41'	Report	Karanga 34', (yellow card) 54'; Bodurov (yellow card) 38'; Chorbadzhiyski (yellow card) 38'; Malinov (yellow card) 74'; Gyasi 90+2'	Stadium: Gradski stadion Attendance: 1,680; Referee: Georgi Kabakov (Plovdiv)
Note: The website of First League lists Kristiyan Malinov as scorer of the first goal for CSKA.

8 March 2018 24	CSKA	2−1	Etar	Sofia
17:30 EET	Karanga 23'; Henrique 86'	Report	Manneh 43'; Sarmov (yellow card) 59'; Skerlev (yellow card) 78'	Stadium: Stadion Balgarska Armiya; Attendance: 960; Referee: Stefan Apostolov (Simitli)

11 March 2018 25	Pirin	1−2	CSKA	Blagoevgrad
15:00 EET	Kirilov 30'; Henderson (yellow card) 45'; Sandev (yellow card) 79'; Kostov (yellow card) 90+2'	Report	Geferson (yellow card) 13'; Karanga (yellow card) 34', (goal) 90+3'; Malinov (yellow card) 44'; Georgiev 88'	Stadium: Stadion Hristo Botev; Attendance: 4,800; Referee: Georgi Dimitrov (Sofia)

18 March 2018 26	CSKA	1−0	Levski	Sofia
13:00 EET	Manolev (yellow card) 42'; Despodov (yellow card) 59'; Malinov (yellow card) 59'; Bodurov (yellow card) 66'; Gyasi (yellow card) 82'; Karanga 84'	Report	Eyjólfsson (yellow card) 34'; Goranov (yellow card) 55'; Jablonský (yellow card) 56'	Stadium: Natsionalen stadion Vasil Levski; Attendance: 16,500; Referee: Nikola Popov (Sofia)

==== Championship round ====
===== League table =====
Pos	Team	Pld	W	D	L	GF	GA	GD	Pts	Qualification
1	Ludogorets Razgrad (C)	36	27	7	2	91	22	+69	88	Qualification for the Champions League first qualifying round
2	CSKA Sofia	36	24	9	3	80	26	+54	81	Qualification for the Europa League first qualifying round
3	Levski Sofia (O)	36	18	10	8	55	27	+28	64	Qualification for the European play-off final
4	Beroe	36	16	11	9	45	43	+2	59	
5	Botev Plovdiv	36	15	11	10	62	49	+13	56	
6	Vereya	36	10	6	20	27	61	−34	36	

Source: Soccerway
Rules for classification: 1) Points; 2) Head-to-head points; 3) Head-to-head goal difference; 4) Head-to-head goals scored; 5) Head-to-head away goals scored (only if two teams); 6) Goal difference; 7) Goals scored; 8) Fairplay ranking; 9) Draw.
(C) Champions; (O) Play-off winners

===== Results summary =====
Overall								Home						Away					
Pld	W	D	L	GF	GA	GD	Pts	W	D	L	GF	GA	GD	W	D	L	GF	GA	GD
10	5	3	2	21	12	+9	18	3	2	0	12	4	+8	2	1	2	9	8	+1

Last updated: 20 May 2018.
Source: See results

===== Results by round =====
Round	1	2	3	4	5	6	7	8	9	10
Ground	H	A	H	H	A	A	H	A	A	H
Result	W	L	W	D	D	L	D	W	W	W
Position	2	2	2	2	2	2	2	2	2	2

Source: See Results
A = Away; H = Home; W = Win; D = Draw; L = Loss

===== Results =====
31 March 2018 27	CSKA	4−1	Botev	Sofia
20:00 EEST	Dimov 40' (o.g.); Loé 45+1'; Tiago 52'; Blanco (yellow card) 67', (goal) 90+3'	Report	Terziev (yellow card) 44'; Marin (yellow card) 56'; Petkov 85'; Dimov (yellow card) 90+2'	Stadium: Stadion Balgarska Armiya; Attendance: 3,830; Referee: Stefan Apostolov (Simitli)

6 April 2018 28	Ludogorets	3−2	CSKA	Razgrad
17:00 EEST	Świerczok 51', 88', (yellow card) 90+1'; Dyakov (yellow card) 56'; Keșerü 84'; Misidjan (yellow card) 90'; Marcelinho (yellow card) 90+1'	Report	Despodov 45+2'; Geferson (yellow card) 53' (yellow-red card) 55'; Henrique (yellow card) 56'; Karanga (yellow card) 57'; Pinto 71'; Manolev (yellow card) 79'; Bodurov (yellow card) 90'	Stadium: Ludogorets Arena; Attendance: 6,700; Referee: Stanislav Todorov (Shumen)

14 April 2018 29	CSKA	5−1	Vereya	Sofia
17:30 EEST	Dyulgerov (yellow card) 9'; Alberg 17', 52'; Chorbadzhiyski 30', 45+1'; Antov (yellow card) 84'; Manolev 90+1' (pen.)	Report	Andonov (yellow card) 14'; Ivanov (yellow card) 47'; Chemlal 83'	Stadium: Stadion Balgarska Armiya; Attendance: 1,400; Referee: Angel Angelov (Sofia)

18 April 2018 30	CSKA	2−2	Levski	Sofia
18:00 EEST	Karanga 6' (pen.); Henrique 9'; Geferson (red card) 83'; Manolev (yellow card) 88'; Atanasov (yellow card) 89'; Pinto (yellow card) 90'	Report	Cvetković (yellow card) 6'; Jablonský (yellow card) 21'; Goranov 48'; Paulinho 61'; Obertan (yellow card) 80'; Buș (red card) 83'	Stadium: Natsionalen stadion Vasil Levski; Attendance: 12,000; Referee: Stefan Apostolov (Simitli)

21 April 2018 31	Beroe	1−1	CSKA	Stara Zagora
20:00 EEST	Raynov (yellow card) 21'; Eugénio 63' (pen.), (yellow card) 85'	Report	Antov (yellow card) 28'; Manolev 55'; Alberg (yellow card) 60'; Loé (yellow card) 87'; Chorbadzhiyski (yellow card) 90'	Stadium: Stadion Beroe; Attendance: 4,800; Referee: Stanislav Stavrov (Veliko Tarnovo)

29 April 2018 32	Botev	2−1	CSKA	Plovdiv
20:15 EEST	João Paulo 31'; Petkov 55'; Minev (red card) 90+4'	Report	Blanco 48', (penalty missed) 90+5'; Atanasov (yellow card) 66'; Alberg (yellow card) 81'	Stadium: Futbolen complex Botev 1912; Attendance: 2,700; Referee: Dragomir Draganov (Varna)

5 May 2018 33	CSKA	0−0	Ludogorets	Sofia
20:00 EEST	Atanasov (yellow card) 68'	Report	Cicinho (yellow card) 18'; Forster (yellow card) 41'	Stadium: Natsionalen stadion Vasil Levski; Attendance: 29,000; Referee: Nikola Popov (Sofia)

12 May 2018 34	Vereya	0−2	CSKA	Stara Zagora
20:30 EEST	Abdulghani (yellow card) 66'	Report	Antov (yellow card) 35'; Alberg (yellow card) 40', (goal) 73'; Manolev (yellow card) 42'; Barthe 64'; Chorbadzhiyski (yellow card) 83'	Stadium: Trace Arena; Attendance: 700; Referee: Georgi Davidov (Veliko Tarnovo)

15 May 2018 35	Levski	2−3	CSKA	Sofia
18:30 EEST	Paulinho 35'; Cabral (yellow card) 40'; Goranov (yellow card) 55'; Belmonte (yellow card) 76'; Kostov 78'	Report	Henrique 20'; Atanasov (yellow card) 48'; Pinto (yellow card) 54', (goal) 90'; Malinov 57'; Bodurov (yellow card) 77'	Stadium: Natsionalen stadion Vasil Levski; Attendance: 7,900; Referee: Volen Chinkov (Sofia)

20 May 2018 36	CSKA	1−0	Beroe	Sofia
20:00 EEST	Despodov (yellow card) 37', (goal) 66' (pen.); Loé (yellow card) 83'	Report	Raynov (yellow card) 65' (yellow-red card) 90+2'	Stadium: Stadion Balgarska Armiya; Attendance: 1,000; Referee: Petar Kirilov (Dobrich)

=== Bulgarian Cup ===
19 September 2017 First Round	Nesebar	1−4	CSKA	Nesebar
16:00 EEST	Manev (yellow card) 44'; Bodurov 90+1' (o.g.)	Report	Koubemba 15', 30', 60'; Atanasov (yellow card) 48'; Despodov 89'	Stadium: Stadion Nesebar; Attendance: 1,190; Referee: Stanislav Stavrov (Veliko Tarnovo)

24 October 2017 Second Round	CSKA	3−1	Botev Vratsa	Sofia
18:00 EEST	Karanga 68'; Mercado (yellow card) 70'; Despodov 81'; Koubemba 84'; Atanasov (yellow card) 85'	Report	Dimitrov 8'; Grigorov (red card) 63'; Gadzhev (yellow card) 64'	Stadium: Stadion Balgarska Armiya; Attendance: 790; Referee: Petar Kostadinov (Dobrich)

14 December 2017 Quarterfinal	CSKA	2−1 (a.e.t.)	Ludogorets	Sofia
17:30 EET	Bodurov 9'; Loé (yellow card) 22'; Dyulgerov (yellow card) 33'; Barthe (yellow card) 50'; Karanga (yellow card) 71'; Malinov (yellow card) 77'; Despodov 96', (yellow card) 97'; Manolev (yellow card) 98'; Culma (yellow card) 105'	Report	Wanderson (yellow card) 22'; Góralski (yellow card) 30'; Moți 34' (pen.); Natanael (red card) 109'; Misidjan (yellow card) 114'; Campanharo (yellow card) 119'	Stadium: Stadion Balgarska Armiya; Attendance: 14,500; Referee: Georgi Kabakov (Plovdiv)

11 April 2018 Semifinal Leg 1	CSKA	0−2	Levski	Sofia
18:00 EEST	Bodurov (yellow card) 69'; Loé (yellow card) 81'; Henrique (yellow card) 85'	Report	Buș 7', 46'; Nascimento (yellow card) 56'; Afonso (yellow card) 89'; Obertan (yellow card) 90+3'	Stadium: Natsionalen stadion Vasil Levski; Attendance: 20,000; Referee: Ivaylo Stoyanov (Petrich)

25 April 2018 Semifinal Leg 2	Levski	2−2 (4−2 agg.)	CSKA	Sofia
18:30 EEST	Gómez 6'; Thiam (red card) 28'; Buș 65'; Paulinho (yellow card) 77'; Mitrev (yellow card) 90+1'	Report	Barthe (yellow card) 40'; Pinto (yellow card) 41'; Blanco 57'; Alberg 82'; Atanasov (yellow card) 88'; Geferson (yellow card) 89'	Stadium: Natsionalen stadion Vasil Levski; Attendance: 24,000; Referee: Nikolay Yordanov (Sofia)

== See also ==
- PFC CSKA Sofia
