= Diogo Gomes (disambiguation) =

Diogo Gomes (c. 1420 – c. 1500) was a Portuguese navigator, explorer and writer.

Diogo Gomes may also refer to:

- Diogo Gomes (footballer, born 1985) (Diogo Soares Gomes), Brazilian footballer
- Diogo Gomes (footballer, born 2000) (Diogo Miguel Ribeiro Gomes), Portuguese footballer

== See also ==
- Diego Gómez (disambiguation)
