= Miguel Magalhães =

Miguel Magalhães may refer to:

- Miguel Maga (footballer, born 1999), Miguel Ângelo Moreira de Magalhães, Portuguese football right-back
- Miguel Maga (footballer, born 2002), Miguel Ângelo Gomes Ferreira Magalhães, Portuguese football right-back
