= Fernando Karanga =

Brazilian footballer (born 1991)

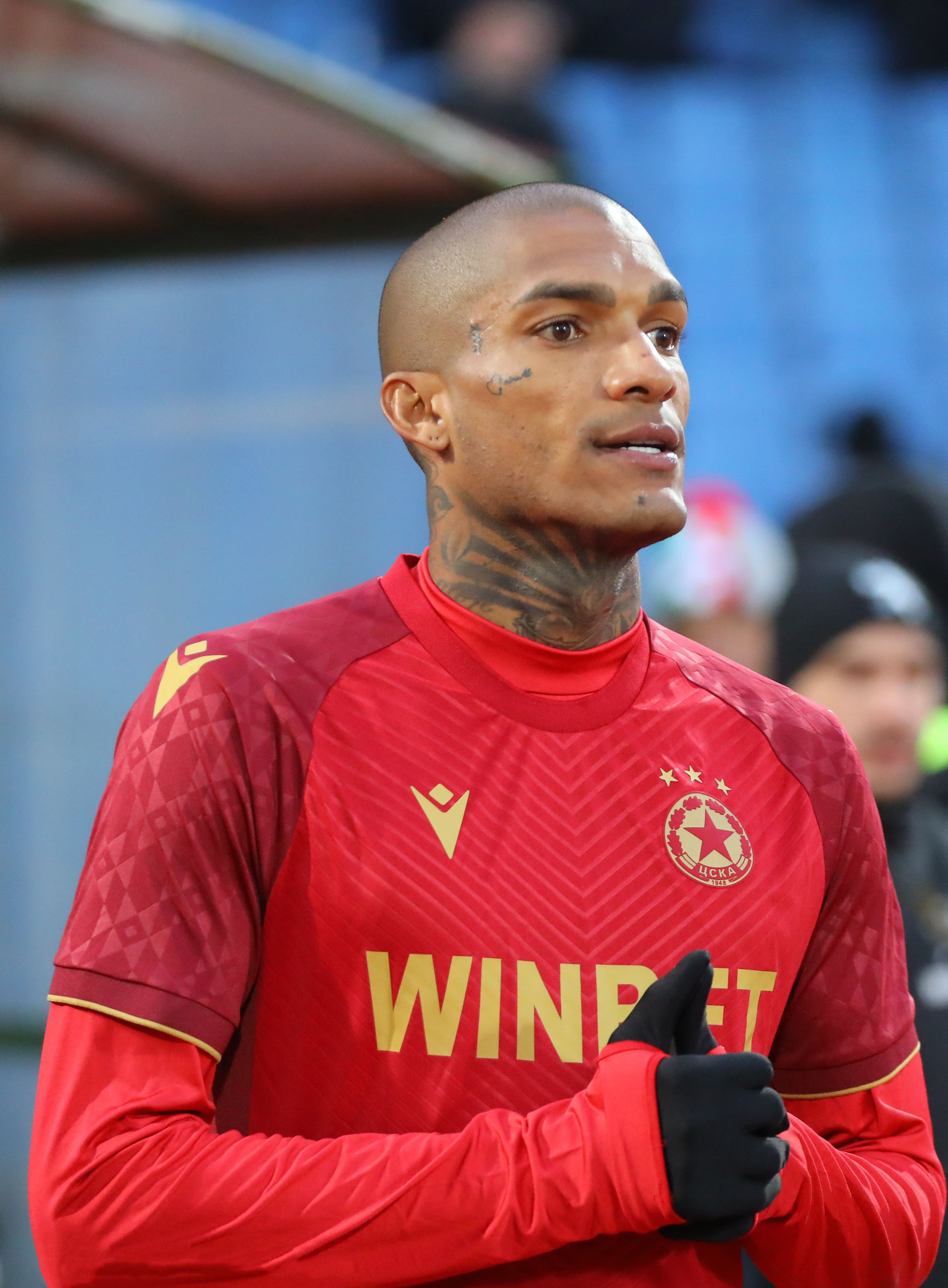
- Karanga in 2024

Personal information
- Full name: Luiz Fernando da Silva Monte
- Date of birth: 14 April 1991 (age 35)
- Place of birth: Camaragibe, Brazil
- Height: 1.91 m (6 ft 3 in)
- Position: Forward

Youth career
- 2008–2010: Náutico
- 2010–2011: Santa Cruz

Senior career*
Years	Team	Apps	(Gls)
2011–2012	Santa Cruz	0	(0)
2011	→ Bragantino (loan)	0	(0)
2012	→ Belo Jardim (loan)	0	(0)
2012	Trindade	0	(0)
2012–2014	Boa Esporte	76	(19)
2014	→ Criciúma (loan)	0	(0)
2015–2017	Jeju United	18	(5)
2016	→ Paraná (loan)	13	(4)
2017–2018	CSKA Sofia	39	(29)
2018–2023	Henan FC	73	(29)
2019	→ Nacional (loan)	0	(0)
2023	Jinan Xingzhou	10	(2)
2024	CSKA Sofia	11	(5)
2024–2025	Dalian Yingbo	23	(7)
- * Club domestic league appearances and goals as of 04:45, 8 July 2025 (UTC)

Luiz Fernando da Silva Monte (born 14 April 1991), commonly known as Fernando Karanga, is a Brazilian footballer who plays as a forward.

== Career ==
=== Early career ===
Karanga began his professional career with Santa Cruz, but failed to cement a first team place and spent loan spells with Bragantino and Belo Jardim before joining Trindade on a permanent basis.

=== CSKA Sofia ===
Karanga signed a two-and-a-half-year deal with CSKA Sofia on 2 February 2017. On 29 April he scored a goal in the Eternal derby of Bulgarian football, netting the third in CSKA's 3–0 win over Levski Sofia.

Karanga began the 2017–18 season with a goal in the first league game against Slavia Sofia on 15 July, which ended in a 1–1 draw. Two weeks later he scored his first hat-trick in Bulgaria during a 6–2 away win over Botev Plovdiv. Karanga continued his scoring run in the following games, scoring 12 goals in his first 11 league matches of the campaign. He also scored on his Bulgarian Cup debut against Botev Vratsa in the 1/8 finals. The Brazilian finished the year with a total of 23 goals in 30 league games for the Reds, in addition to 2 games and 1 goal in the Bulgarian Cup. He continued his fine performances during the first months of 2018, but sustained an injury in the second leg of a Bulgarian Cup match against Levski Sofia on 25 April (after a rough tackle), which sidelined him until the end of the season and was a factor in him finishing in second place for the top goalscorer award in the league.

Karanga is the highest scoring foreign player in the league fixtures of The Eternal Derby with four goals under his belt. He quickly emerged as a favourite with the CSKA Sofia fans.

=== Henan Jianye ===
On 12 July 2018, Karanga was transferred to Chinese Super League side Henan Jianye (later simply known as Henan) for a reported transfer fee of $4 million. He suffered from serious splenic injury in October after a match against Beijing Guoan, and received splenectomy. He discharged from hospital in November, and returned to Brazil for further treatments and recoveries.

In March 2019, he was loaned to Nacional. In July 2019, he recovered from the previous incident, and rejoined Henan Jianye.

On 1 July 2023, he mutually terminated his contract with Henan.

=== Jinan Xingzhou ===
On 19 July 2023, Karanga signed with China League One club Jinan Xingzhou.

=== Return to CSKA Sofia ===
On 16 January 2024, Karanga returned to CSKA Sofia. During his second stay with the "redmen", he managed to find the net on 5 occasions, becoming the foreign player with the most goals in the league for the team, but his stint was marked by disciplinary issues, resulting in two red cards, for the latter of which, received in a heated match against Ludogorets Razgrad, he was handed a six-match ban. He left the team in June 2024, upon the expiration of his contract.

== Career statistics ==
As of 21 May 2025.

Appearances and goals by club, season and competition
Club	Season	League			National Cup		League Cup		Continental		Other		Total	
Club	Season	Division	Apps	Goals	Apps	Goals	Apps	Goals	Apps	Goals	Apps	Goals	Apps	Goals
Santa Cruz	2011	Pernambucano	–		0	0	–		–		0 (Note: Appearances in Campeonato Pernambucano)	0	0	0
Belo Jardim (loan)	2012	Pernambucano	–		0	0	–		–		5	0	5	0
Trindade	2012	Goiano	–		0	0	–		–		9 (Note: Appearances in Campeonato Goiano)	0	9	0
Boa Esporte	2012	Série B	17	3	0	0	–		–		–		17	3
Boa Esporte	2013	Série B	34	5	2	1	–		–		10 (Note: Appearances in Campeonato Mineiro)	4	46	10
Boa Esporte	2014	Série B	25	11	0	0	–		–		–		25	11
Boa Esporte	Total		76	19	2	1	0	0	0	0	10	4	88	24
Criciúma Esporte (loan)	2014	Catarinense	–		1	0	–		–		8 (Note: Appearances in Campeonato Catarinense)	0	9	0
Jeju United	2015	K League	16	5	1	0	–		–		–		17	5
Jeju United	2016	K League	2	0	0	0	–		–		–		2	0
Jeju United	Total		18	5	1	0	0	0	0	0	0	0	19	5
Paraná (loan)	2016	Série B	13	4	0	0	–		–		–		13	4
CSKA Sofia	2016–17	First League	12	6	0	0	–		–		–		12	6
CSKA Sofia	2017–18	First League	27	23	2	1	–		–		–		29	24
CSKA Sofia	Total		39	29	2	1	0	0	0	0	0	0	41	30
Henan Jianye/ Henan Songshan Longmen/ Henan	2018	Chinese Super League	8	5	0	0	–		–		–		8	5
Henan Jianye/ Henan Songshan Longmen/ Henan	2019	Chinese Super League	15	6	0	0	–		–		–		15	6
Henan Jianye/ Henan Songshan Longmen/ Henan	2020	Chinese Super League	15	3	0	0	–		–		–		15	3
Henan Jianye/ Henan Songshan Longmen/ Henan	2021	Chinese Super League	13	4	3	1	–		–		–		16	5
Henan Jianye/ Henan Songshan Longmen/ Henan	2022	Chinese Super League	22	10	0	0	–		–		–		22	10
Henan Jianye/ Henan Songshan Longmen/ Henan	Total		73	28	3	1	0	0	0	0	0	0	76	29
Nacional (loan)	2019	Paulista Série A2	–		0	0	–		–		0 (Note: Appearances in Campeonato Paulista Série A2)	0	0	0
Jinan Xingzhou	2023	China League One	10	2	0	0	–		–		–		10	2
CSKA Sofia	2023–24	First League	11	5	0	0	–		–		–		11	5
Dalian Yingbo	2024	China League One	11	4	0	0	–		–		–		11	4
Dalian Yingbo	2025	China League One	12	3	1	0	–		–		–		13	3
Dalian Yingbo	Total		23	7	1	0	0	0	0	0	0	0	24	7
Career Total			263	99	10	3	0	0	0	0	32	4	316	106

== Honours ==
=== Club ===
Santa Cruz

- Campeonato Pernambucano: 2011

Individual

- Best forward in the Bulgarian First League: 2017
- Best foreign player in the Bulgarian First League: 2017
