= Joca (footballer, born 1996) =

Portuguese footballer

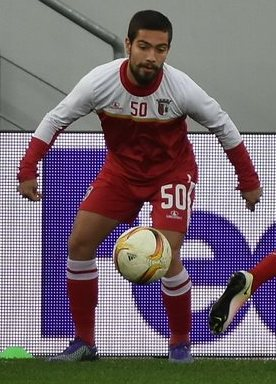

Personal information
- Full name: Jorge Samuel Figueiredo Fernandes
- Date of birth: 30 January 1996 (age 30)
- Place of birth: Braga, Portugal
- Height: 1.67 m (5 ft 6 in)
- Position: Midfielder

Team information
- Current team: Volos
- Number: 10

Youth career
- 2006–2007: Braga
- 2007–2011: Sporting CP
- 2011−2014: Braga

Senior career*
Years	Team	Apps	(Gls)
2014−2018	Braga B	98	(15)
2017−2018	→ Tondela (loan)	14	(0)
2018−2020	Rio Ave	6	(0)
2020	→ Leixões (loan)	3	(0)
2020−2021	Leixões	25	(4)
2021–2024	Rio Ave	65	(7)
2024	Wuhan Three Towns	12	(3)
2025	Gençlerbirliği	14	(1)
2025–	Volos	32	(4)

International career
2015	Portugal U19	3	(0)
2016	Portugal U20	6	(0)
- * Club domestic league appearances and goals as of 21:00, 20 September 2026 (UTC)

Jorge Samuel Figueiredo Fernandes (born 30 January 1996), known as Joca, is a Portuguese professional footballer who plays for Super League Greece club Volos as a midfielder.

== Club career ==
=== Braga ===
Born in Braga, Joca had two youth spells with local S.C. Braga, the last one starting at the age of 15. He made his senior debut with their reserves on 9 August 2014, coming on as a 76th-minute substitute in a 1–0 away loss against C.D. Tondela in the Segunda Liga; he went to spend three full seasons with the side, always in that division.

On 11 July 2017, after scoring a career-best 12 goals during the campaign with Braga B, Joca was loaned to Primeira Liga club Tondela. His first game in the competition occurred on 9 September, when he featured one minute in the 2–2 home draw with F.C. Paços de Ferreira.

=== Rio Ave and Leixões ===
On 27 July 2018, Joca signed a three-year contract at Rio Ave F.C. also of the Portuguese top tier. In January 2020, not being part of manager Carlos Carvalhal's plans, he was loaned to Leixões S.C. until June.

Joca joined Leixões on a permanent basis on 18 August 2020. In July 2021, however, he returned to the Estádio dos Arcos on a one-year deal.

Rio Ave won the second division in 2021–22, with Joca contributing three goals from 31 matches. He missed the vast majority of the following season with a knee injury.

Joca split the 2024–25 season abroad, starting it with Wuhan Three Towns F.C. in the Chinese Super League and finishing with Gençlerbirliği S.K. in the Turkish TFF 1. Lig.

== Career statistics ==
As of match played 13 May 2026

Appearances and goals by club, season and competition
Club	Season	League			National cup		League cup		Continental		Other		Total	
Club	Season	Division	Apps	Goals	Apps	Goals	Apps	Goals	Apps	Goals	Apps	Goals	Apps	Goals
Braga B	2014–15	Segunda Liga	18	0	—		—		—		—		18	0
Braga B	2015–16	LigaPro	42	3	—		—		—		—		42	3
Braga B	2016–17	LigaPro	38	12	—		—		—		—		38	12
Braga B	Total		98	15	—		—		—		—		98	15
Tondela (loan)	2017–18	Primeira Liga	14	0	1	0	1	0	—		—		16	0
Rio Ave	2018–19	Primeira Liga	3	0	0	0	0	0	0	0	—		3	0
Rio Ave	2019–20	Primeira Liga	3	0	0	0	0	0	—		—		3	0
Rio Ave	Total		6	0	0	0	0	0	0	0	—		6	0
Leixões (loan)	2019–20	LigaPro	3	0	—		—		—		—		3	0
Leixões	2020–21	Liga Portugal 2	25	4	1	0	—		—		—		26	4
Leixões	Total		28	4	1	0	—		—		—		29	4
Rio Ave	2021–22	Liga Portugal 2	31	3	5	0	4	0	—		—		40	3
Rio Ave	2022–23	Primeira Liga	6	0	0	0	0	0	—		—		6	0
Rio Ave	2023–24	Primeira Liga	28	4	0	0	2	0	—		—		30	4
Rio Ave	Total		65	7	5	0	6	0	—		—		76	7
Wuhan Three Towns	2024	Chinese Super League	12	3	—		—		—		—		12	3
Gençlerbirliği	2024–25	TFF 1. Lig	14	1	—		—		—		—		14	1
Volos	2024–25	Super League Greece	27	4	2	1	—		—		—		29	5
Career total			264	34	9	1	7	0	0	0	0	0	280	35

== Honours ==
Rio Ave

- Liga Portugal 2: 2021–22
