= Diego Gómez =

Diego Gómez may refer to:

== Sportspeople ==
- Diego Gómez (Colombian footballer) (Diego Fernando Gómez Hurtado, born 1972), retired Colombian football goalkeeper
- Diego Gómez (footballer, born 1984) (Diego Sebastián Gómez), retired Argentine football forward
- Diego Gómez (footballer, born 1990) (Diego José Gómez Heredia), Spanish football goalkeeper
- Diego Gómez (Mexican footballer) (Diego Esaú Gómez Medina, born 2003), Mexican football attacking midfielder
- Diego Gómez (Paraguayan footballer) (Diego Alexander Gómez Amarilla, born 2003), Paraguayan football midfielder
- Diego Gómez (footballer, born 2004) (Diego Gómez Pérez), Spanish football winger

== Other uses ==
- Diego Gómez de Lamadrid (1529–1601), Spanish archbishop
- Diego Gómez (journalist) (1936–2021), Spanish journalist
- Diego Gómez Pickering (born 1977), Mexican diplomat and writer
- Diego Gómez, a Wikimedian, see Wikimedian of the Year#Honorable mentions

== See also ==
- Diogo Gomes (disambiguation)
