= 2022 Taça da Liga final =

- Event: 2021–22 Taça da Liga
Sporting CP	Benfica
2	1
- Date: 29 January 2022
- Venue: Estádio Municipal de Leiria, Leiria
- Referee: Manuel Mota
- Attendance: 20,622

The 2022 Taça da Liga final was the final match of the 2021–22 Taça da Liga, the fifteenth season of the Taça da Liga. It was played on 29 January 2022 at Estádio Municipal de Leiria.

The competition involved the 34 clubs playing in the top two tiers of the Portuguese football league system – 18 from Primeira Liga and 16 from Liga Portugal 2 – during the 2021–22 season. Reserve sides of Primeira Liga teams that played in the 2020–21 Liga Portugal 2 were excluded from the competition. The competition format suffered changes for a to accommodate a reduction in the number of participating teams, particularly from the Liga Portugal 2.

Benfica and Sporting CP faced off for the second time in a rematch of the 2009 final. In the final, Sporting defeated Benfica 2–1 to earn its fourth title in their sixth final, with Benfica losing their first final. Sporting became the second team (after Benfica) in the competition's history to win the competition four times.

== Background ==
The competition format suffered changes this season featuring the return of the final four format with both the semi-finals and the final being played over a space of a few days in the same venue. The Estádio Dr. Magalhães Pessoa hosted all matches. The two teams had played in the second final in 2009 with Benfica winning on penalty kicks.

== Route to the final ==
Note: In all results below, the score of the finalist is given first (H: home; A: away).

Benfica			Round	Sporting CP		
Opponent	Result	Stadium	First round	Opponent	Result	Stadium
Bye			First round	Bye		
Opponent	Result	Stadium	Second round	Opponent	Result	Stadium
Bye			Second round	Bye		
Opponent	Result	Stadium	Third round	Opponent	Result	Stadium
Vitória de Guimarães	3–3 (A)	Estádio D. Afonso Henriques	Matchday 1	Famalicão	2–1 (H)	Estádio José Alvalade
Sporting da Covilhã	3–0 (H)	Estádio da Luz	Matchday 2	Penafiel	1–0 (A)	Estádio Municipal 25 de Abril
Group B winners: Team / Pld / W / D / L / GF / GA / GD / Pts; Benfica / 2 / 2 / 1 / 1 / 6 / 3 / +3 / 4; Vitória de Guimarães / 2 / 2 / 1 / 1 / 5 / 3 / +2 / 4; Sporting da Covilhã / 3 / 0 / 0 / 2 / 0 / 5 / −5 / 0			Final standings	Group A winners: Team / Pld / W / D / L / GF / GA / GD / Pts; Sporting CP / 2 / 2 / 0 / 0 / 3 / 1 / +2 / 6; Famalicão / 2 / 1 / 0 / 1 / 6 / 2 / +4 / 3; Penafiel / 2 / 0 / 0 / 2 / 0 / 6 / –6 / 0		
Opponent	Result	Stadium	Knockout phase	Opponent	Result	Stadium
Boavista	1–1 (3–2p) (N)	Estádio Municipal de Leiria	Semi-finals	Santa Clara	2–1 (N)	Estádio Municipal de Leiria

== Match ==
=== Details ===
29 January 2022
19:45 WET (UTC±00:00)

Benfica	1–2	Sporting CP
Everton 23'	Report	Inácio 49'; Sarabia 78'

Estádio Municipal de Leiria, Leiria
Attendance: 20,622
Referee: Manuel Mota

Benfica	Sporting

GK	99	(Greece) Odysseas Vlachodimos
RB	22	(Austria) Valentino Lazaro
CB	5	(Belgium) Jan Vertonghen (c)	(yellow card) 53'
CB	91	(Brazil) Morato	(substituted off) 83'
LB	3	(Spain) Álex Grimaldo
CM	28	(Germany) Julian Weigl
CM	11	(France) Soualiho Meïté	(substituted off) 83'
CM	20	(Portugal) João Mário	(yellow card) 90+2'
RW	17	(Portugal) Diogo Gonçalves	(substituted off) 74'
CF	15	(Ukraine) Roman Yaremchuk	(substituted off) 61'
LW	7	(Brazil) Everton	(yellow card) 58'	(substituted off) 83'
Substitutes:
GK	77	(Brazil) Helton Leite
DF	34	(Portugal) André Almeida
DF	97	(Portugal) Ferro
MF	55	(Portugal) Paulo Bernardo
MF	21	(Portugal) Pizzi	(substituted in) 83'
MF	49	(Morocco) Adel Taarabt	(substituted in) 83'
FW	29	(Portugal) Henrique Araújo	(substituted in) 83'
FW	88	(Portugal) Gonçalo Ramos	(substituted in) 61'
FW	31	(Portugal) Gil Dias	(substituted in) 74'
Manager:
(Portugal) Nélson Veríssimo

GK	1	(Spain) Antonio Adán
CB	13	(Portugal) Luís Neto (c)	(yellow card) 31'	(substituted off) 66'
CB	52	(Portugal) Gonçalo Inácio
CB	3	(Morocco) Zouhair Feddal
RM	47	(Portugal) Ricardo Esgaio	(yellow card) 77'
CM	6	(Portugal) João Palhinha
CM	8	(Portugal) Matheus Nunes	(yellow card) 59'	(substituted off) 85'
LM	2	(Brazil) Matheus Reis
RW	28	(Portugal) Pedro Gonçalves
CF	21	(Portugal) Paulinho	(yellow card) 53'	(substituted off) 88'
LW	17	(Spain) Pablo Sarabia	(substituted off) 88'
Substitutes:
GK	31	(Portugal) João Virgínia
DF	24	(Spain) Pedro Porro	(substituted in) 66'
MF	15	(Uruguay) Manuel Ugarte	(substituted in) 85'
MF	68	(Portugal) Daniel Bragança
FW	11	(Portugal) Nuno Santos	(substituted in) 88'
FW	7	(Brazil) Bruno Tabata
FW	10	(Cape Verde) Jovane Cabral
FW	57	(Mozambique) Geny Catamo
FW	19	(Portugal) Tiago Tomás	(substituted in) 88'
Manager:
(Portugal) Ruben Amorim

Assistant referees:
Jorge Fernandes
Luciano Maia
Fourth official:
Manuel Oliveira
Video assistant referee:
Artur Soares Dias
Assistant video assistant referee:
Rui Costa

Match rules

- 90 minutes.
- Penalty shoot-out if scores still level.
- Seven named substitutes.
- Maximum of three substitutions.

== See also ==
- Derby de Lisboa
- 2021–22 S.L. Benfica season
- 2021–22 Sporting CP season
- 2022 Taça de Portugal final
