= Miguel Maga (footballer, born 1999) =

Portuguese footballer

Maga
Personal information
- Full name: Miguel Ângelo Moreira de Magalhães
- Date of birth: 19 April 1999 (age 27)
- Place of birth: Marco de Canaveses, Portugal
- Height: 1.74 m (5 ft 8 1/2 in)
- Position: Right-back

Team information
- Current team: União Leiria
- Number: 68

Youth career
- 2007–2008: Alpendorada
- 2008–2011: CB Póvoa Lanhoso
- 2011–2012: Porto
- 2012–2016: Penafiel
- 2016–2017: Vitória Guimarães

Senior career*
Years	Team	Apps	(Gls)
2017–2022	Vitória Guimarães B	68	(2)
2021	Vitória Guimarães	0	(0)
2022–2023	Oliveirense	27	(0)
2023–2025	Penafiel	62	(3)
2025–	União Leiria	30	(3)
- * Club domestic league appearances and goals as of 21:32, 2 June 2026 (UTC)

Miguel Ângelo Moreira de Magalhães (born 19 April 1999), known as Maga, is a Portuguese professional footballer who plays as a right-back for Liga Portugal 2 club União de Leiria.

== Club career ==
Born in Marco de Canaveses, Porto District, Maga joined Vitória de Guimarães' academy at the age of 17. He spent the vast majority of his spell with their reserves, making his debut in the LigaPro on 6 August 2017 in a 3–0 away loss against Varzim SC.

Maga's input for the first team consisted of ten minutes as a substitute for Marcus Edwards, and he closed the 4–1 home win over Leixões S.C. in the first round of the Taça da Liga on 26 July 2021. After being released, he resumed his career in the second division with U.D. Oliveirense and F.C. Penafiel.

Maga scored his first second-tier goal on 11 August 2024, helping hosts Penafiel to come from behind 3–0 and win 4–3 against his former club Oliveirense. He remained in the second tier for the 2025–26 season, on a two-year contract at U.D. Leiria.
