= Ukra =

Portuguese footballer (born 1988)

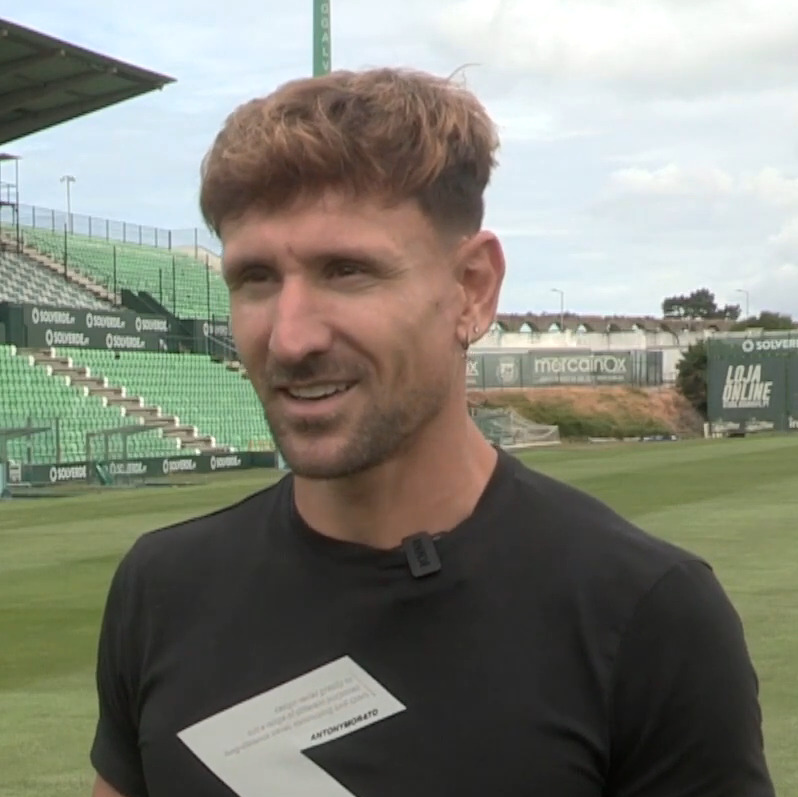
- Ukra in 2024

Personal information
- Full name: André Filipe Alves Monteiro
- Date of birth: 16 March 1988 (age 38)
- Place of birth: Famalicão, Portugal
- Height: 1.76 m (5 ft 9 in)
- Position: Winger

Youth career
- 1999–2001: Famalicão
- 2001–2007: Porto
- 2003–2004: → Padroense (loan)

Senior career*
Years	Team	Apps	(Gls)
2007–2013	Porto	2	(0)
2007–2008	→ Varzim (loan)	21	(1)
2008–2010	→ Olhanense (loan)	58	(7)
2011–2012	→ Braga (loan)	19	(4)
2012–2013	→ Rio Ave (loan)	26	(1)
2013–2016	Rio Ave	84	(9)
2016–2017	Al Fateh	19	(5)
2018	CSKA Sofia	1	(0)
2018–2021	Santa Clara	65	(2)
2021–2024	Rio Ave	42	(0)
Total		337	(29)

International career
2003	Portugal U16	5	(2)
2004–2005	Portugal U17	15	(1)
2005–2006	Portugal U18	2	(0)
2007	Portugal U19	5	(0)
2008	Portugal U20	2	(0)
2008–2010	Portugal U21	16	(3)
2010	Portugal U23	1	(0)
2015	Portugal	1	(0)
- * Club domestic league appearances and goals

André Filipe Alves Monteiro (born 16 March 1988), known as Ukra, is a Portuguese former professional footballer who played as a right winger.

Brought up at Porto, where he made eight senior appearances, he played 245 Primeira Liga games for five clubs, mainly in two spells at Rio Ave and also Olhanense, Braga and Santa Clara.

Ukra earned 46 caps for Portugal at youth level, and played one senior match in 2015.

== Club career ==
=== Porto ===
Born in Vila Nova de Famalicão, Braga District, Ukra began playing football for F.C. Famalicão, moving at age 13 to FC Porto to complete his development. In 2007–08 he got his first taste of first-team football, spending one season on loan to another northern club, Varzim S.C. in the Segunda Liga.

Ukra continued on loan the following two years, now in the south of the country with S.C. Olhanense. He scored six goals in 30 matches in his debut campaign, helping the Algarve team to return to the Primeira Liga after 34 years. In November 2009, it was reported that the player was being scouted by Newcastle United of the Football League Championship after an under-21 match against England at Wembley in which he played the full 90 minutes.

In January 2011, Ukra was loaned to S.C. Braga, contributing solidly as the Minho side finished fourth and qualified for the UEFA Europa League by netting twice, notably in a 3–1 home win against Vitória S.C. in a local derby. He did not participate in the club's Europa League runner-up campaign, being cup-tied after having appeared in the competition for eventual champions Porto; he made his debut for them on 19 August 2010 by starting in the 3–0 win at K.R.C. Genk in the first leg of the playoff, and came off the bench in a 3–1 win at SK Rapid Wien in the group stage.

Ukra was again loaned to Braga for 2011–12, spending however the better part of the season on the sidelines due to injury a left knee tendon injury picked up in a friendly against C.D. Aves in July. He returned on 4 February 2012 in a Taça da Liga group game against Portimonense SC, and 23 days later again as a late replacement, he scored to conclude a 4–0 home win over Vitória de Guimarães. On 22 March, he was one of two Arsenalistas to miss in the penalty shootout defeat to Gil Vicente F.C. in the league cup semi-finals.

=== Rio Ave ===
Ukra spent four years with fellow top-division team Rio Ave FC, the first on loan in 2012–13. He scored his first goal for the club on 2 February 2013 to help the hosts defeat Sporting CP 2–1, and also netted twice during the team's runner-up run in the 2013–14 edition of the Taça de Portugal.

=== Abroad ===
On 18 July 2016, free agent Ukra signed with Al Fateh SC from the Saudi Pro League. In February 2018, in the same capacity, he joined Bulgaria's PFC CSKA Sofia. He made his first (and only) official appearance for the latter on 31 March, in the 4–1 home victory over Botev Plovdiv in a league match, coming on as a substitute during the second half; in June, he was released.

=== Return to Portugal ===
Ukra returned to Portugal's top flight on 8 August 2018, signing with newly promoted C.D. Santa Clara. After making 23 appearances in his first season in the Azores, he was given a two-year contract extension. He missed only seven games in his final season as the team came a best-ever sixth and qualified for the UEFA Europa Conference League; his one goal that campaign was a penalty in the sixth minute of added time to conclude a 5–1 rout of C.D. Nacional at the Estádio de São Miguel on 11 April 2021.

On 12 July 2021, the 33-year-old Ukra returned to Rio Ave on a one-year deal. After helping to promotion as champions, he was retained in the top flight by manager Luís Freire for the next two seasons.

== International career ==
In mid-2009, courtesy of his solid Olhanense displays, Ukra was summoned for the Portugal under-21s. He represented the nation at the 2007 UEFA European Under-19 Championship, and also took part in the unsuccessful qualifying campaign for the 2007 European Under-21 Championship.

Ukra made his debut for the full side on 31 March 2015, coming on as a 46th-minute substitute for João Mário in a 0–2 friendly defeat against Cape Verde in Estoril.

== Personal life ==
Ukra's nickname derives from his youth, when his thin-blond hair led to him being called "Ukrainian" ("Ucraniano" in Portuguese), which was then shortened to "Ukra".

== Career statistics ==
Appearances and goals by club, season and competition
Club	Season	League			National cup (Note: Includes Taça de Portugal, King Cup)		League cup (Note: Includes Taça da Liga, Saudi Crown Prince Cup)		Continental		Other		Total	
Club	Season	Division	Apps	Goals	Apps	Goals	Apps	Goals	Apps	Goals	Apps	Goals	Apps	Goals
Porto	2007–08	Primeira Liga	0	0	0	0	0	0	0	0	0	0	0	0
Porto	2008–09	Primeira Liga	0	0	0	0	0	0	0	0	0	0	0	0
Porto	2009–10	Primeira Liga	0	0	0	0	0	0	0	0	0	0	0	0
Porto	2010–11	Primeira Liga	2	0	3	0	1	0	2 (Note: Appearances in UEFA Europa League)	0	0	0	8	0
Porto	Total		2	0	3	0	1	0	2	0	0	0	8	0
Varzim (loan)	2007–08	Liga de Honra	21	1	1	0	2	1	—		—		24	2
Olhanense (loan)	2008–09	Liga de Honra	30	6	2	1	6	0	—		—		38	7
Olhanense (loan)	2009–10	Primeira Liga	28	1	0	0	1	0	—		—		29	1
Olhanense (loan)	Total		58	7	2	1	7	0	—		—		67	8
Braga (loan)	2010–11	Primeira Liga	12	2	0	0	1	0	0	0	—		13	2
Braga (loan)	2011–12	Primeira Liga	7	2	0	0	2	0	0	0	—		9	2
Braga (loan)	Total		19	4	0	0	3	0	0	0	—		22	4
Rio Ave (loan)	2012–13	Primeira Liga	26	1	1	0	5	0	—		—		32	1
Rio Ave	2013–14	Primeira Liga	25	4	6	2	5	2	—		—		36	8
Rio Ave	2014–15	Primeira Liga	33	4	6	2	2	0	10	0	1 (Note: Appearance in Supertaça Cândido de Oliveira)	0	52	6
Rio Ave	2015–16	Primeira Liga	26	1	5	0	1	0	—		—		32	1
Rio Ave	Total		110	10	18	4	13	2	10	0	1	0	152	16
Al Fateh	2016–17	Saudi Pro League	19	5	1	0	1	0	3 (Note: Appearances in AFC Champions League)	1	—		24	6
CSKA Sofia	2017–18	Bulgarian First League	1	0	0	0	—		—		—		1	0
Santa Clara	2018–19	Primeira Liga	23	0	1	0	0	0	—		—		24	0
Santa Clara	2019–20	Primeira Liga	15	1	1	0	4	0	—		—		20	1
Santa Clara	2020–21	Primeira Liga	27	1	4	2	—		—		—		31	3
Santa Clara	Total		65	2	6	2	4	0	—		—		75	4
Rio Ave	2021–22	Liga Portugal 2	21	0	3	0	4	0	—		—		28	0
Rio Ave	2022–23	Primeira Liga	15	0	1	0	2	0	—		—		18	0
Rio Ave	2023–24	Primeira Liga	6	0	0	0	1	0	—		—		7	0
Rio Ave	Total		42	0	4	0	7	0	—		—		53	0
Career total			337	29	35	7	38	3	15	1	1	0	426	40

== Honours ==
Porto

- Primeira Liga: 2010–11
- Taça de Portugal: 2010–11
- Supertaça Cândido de Oliveira: 2010
- UEFA Europa League: 2010–11

Olhanense

- Segunda Liga: 2008–09

Rio Ave

- Liga Portugal 2: 2021–22
