= Jean Carlos Blanco =

Colombian footballer (born 1992)

Personal information
- Full name: Jean Carlos Blanco Becerra
- Date of birth: 6 April 1992 (age 34)
- Place of birth: Villa del Rosario, Colombia
- Height: 1.85 m (6 ft 1 in)
- Position: Forward

Team information
- Current team: Tecnico Universitario
- Number: 9

Senior career*
Years	Team	Apps	(Gls)
2009	Cúcuta Deportivo	6	(1)
2010–2012	Atlético Huila	16	(1)
2013	Deportes Tolima	0	(0)
2013	Cúcuta Deportivo	8	(2)
2014	Atlético Huila	37	(7)
2015–2017	La Equidad	107	(22)
2018	CSKA Sofia	13	(3)
2018	Independiente Medellín	8	(1)
2019	Once Caldas	13	(2)
2019	Unión Magdalena	14	(0)
2020	Boyacá Chicó	11	(1)
2021	Ilves	24	(2)
2022-2023	Tecnico Universitario	42	(17)
2024-2025	S.D. Aucas	28	(7)
2025	Atlético Bucaramanga	8	(0)
2025-	Tecnico Universitario	3	(1)

International career
2008–2009	Colombia U17	4	(1)
- * Club domestic league appearances and goals as of 4 December 2024

Jean Carlos Blanco Becerra (born 6 April 1992) is a Colombian footballer who plays as a forward for Serie A club Tecnico Universitario.

== Career ==
On 14 December 2017, Blanco signed a long-term contract with Bulgarian side CSKA Sofia. He was released at the end of the 2017–18 season.

On 7 July 2018, Blanco signed with Independiente Medellín.

== Career statistics ==
As of 21 May 2018

Club	Season	League			Cup (Note: Includes Suomen Cup)		League cup (Note: Includes Finnish League Cup)		Europe		Total	
Club	Season	Division	Apps	Goals	Apps	Goals	Apps	Goals	Apps	Goals	Apps	Goals
Cúcuta Deportivo	2009	Categoría Primera A	6	1	0	0	–		–		6	1
Atlético Huila	2010	Categoría Primera A	1	0	0	0	–		–		1	0
Atlético Huila	2011	Categoría Primera A	5	1	0	0	–		–		5	1
Atlético Huila	2012	Categoría Primera A	10	0	5	0	–		–		15	0
Deportes Tolima	2013	Categoría Primera A	0	0	1	0	–		–		1	0
Cúcuta Deportivo	2013	Categoría Primera A	8	2	0	0	–		2 (Note: Relegation Play-offs)	0	10	2
Atlético Huila	2014	Categoría Primera A	37	7	6	1	–		–		43	8
La Equidad	2015	Categoría Primera A	38	10	6	0	–		–		44	10
La Equidad	2016	Categoría Primera A	31	7	6	1	–		–		37	8
La Equidad	2017	Categoría Primera A	38	5	5	1	–		–		43	6
CSKA Sofia	2017–18	Bulgarian First League	13	3	2	1	–		–		15	4
Independiente Medellín	2018	Categoría Primera A	8	1	1	0	–		–		9	1
Once Caldas	2019	Categoría Primera A	13	2	0	0	–		2 (Note: Appearances in Copa Sudamericana)	0	15	2
Unión Magdalena	2019	Categoría Primera A	14	0	1	0	–		–		15	0
Boyacá Chicó	2020	Categoría Primera A	11	1	2	0	–		–		13	1
Ilves	2021	Veikkausliiga	24	2	0	0	–		–		24	2
Tecnico Universitario	2022	Ecuadorian Serie A	22	4	1	0	–		–		23	4
Tecnico Universitario	2023	Ecuadorian Serie A	20	13	0	0	–		–		20	13
Tecnico Universitario	Total		42	17	1	0	0	0	0	0	43	17
S.D. Aucas	2024	Ecuadorian Serie A	28	7	2	1	–		1 (Note: Appearance(s) in Copa Libertadores)	0	31	8
Career total			324	66	40	5	0	0	5	0	369	71
