= Tavinho (footballer, born 1993) =

Portuguese footballer

Personal information
- Full name: Octávio Alexandre Leal de Barros
- Date of birth: 4 September 1993 (age 33)
- Place of birth: Loulé, Portugal
- Height: 1.79 m (5 ft 10 in)
- Position: Winger

Team information
- Current team: Tarxien Rainbows
- Number: 7

Youth career
- 2003–2012: Internacional Almancil

Senior career*
Years	Team	Apps	(Gls)
2012–2013	Moncarapachense		
2013–2014	Internacional Almancil		
2014	Louletano		
2014–2015	Culatrense		
2015	Quarteirense		
2016–2017	Almancilense	33	(12)
2017–2019	Farense	60	(14)
2020–2021	Vizela	39	(9)
2021–2022	Varzim	32	(1)
2022–2023	Alverca	19	(1)
2023–2024	RANS Nusantara	31	(6)
2024–2025	Moncarapachense	18	(11)
2025–	Tarxien Rainbows	8	(0)
- * Club domestic league appearances and goals as of 6 October 2025

Octávio Alexandre Leal de Barros (born 4 September 1993), commonly known as Tavinho, is a Portuguese professional footballer who plays as a winger for Maltese Premier League club Tarxien Rainbows.

== Career ==
On 29 July 2018, Tavinho made his professional debut with Farense in a 2018–19 Taça da Liga match against Estoril Praia. On 30 June 2021, he moved to Varzim.
