= Diogo Gomes (footballer, born 2000) =

Portuguese footballer

Personal information
- Full name: Diogo Miguel Ribeiro Gomes
- Date of birth: 6 October 2000 (age 26)
- Place of birth: Matosinhos, Portugal
- Height: 1.93 m (6 ft 4 in)
- Position: Centre-back

Team information
- Current team: AEL Limassol
- Number: 23

Youth career
- 2008–2020: Leixões

Senior career*
Years	Team	Apps	(Gls)
2020–2022	Leixões	12	(0)
2022	Montalegre	9	(0)
2022–2023	São João de Ver	21	(0)
2023–2025	Felgueiras	5	(0)
2025–2026	Trofense	30	(1)
2026–	AEL Limassol	9	(1)
- * Club domestic league appearances and goals as of 7 November 2026

Diogo Miguel Ribeiro Gomes (born 6 October 2000) is a Portuguese footballer who plays for Cypriot First Division club AEL Limassol as a centre-back.

== Football career ==
He made his professional debut for Leixões on 28 September 2020 in the Liga Portugal 2.
