= 2021–22 Belenenses SAD season =

B-SAD
2021–22 season
- Chairman: Rui Pedro Soares
- Manager: Petit
- Stadium: Estádio Nacional
- Primeira Liga: 18th
- Taça de Portugal: Fifth round
- Taça da Liga: First round
Home colours	Away colours	Third colours

The 2021–22 season was the 4th season in the existence of B-SAD and the club's third consecutive season in the top flight of Portuguese football. In addition to the domestic league, B-SAD participated in this season's editions of the Taça de Portugal and the Taça da Liga.

== Players ==
=== First-team squad ===
As of 29 July 2021

Note: Flags indicate national team as defined under FIFA eligibility rules; some limited exceptions apply. Players may hold more than one non-FIFA nationality.

No.	Pos.	Nation	Player
1	GK	BRA	Luiz Felipe
2	DF	POR	Diogo Calila
4	DF	POR	Tomás Ribeiro
5	DF	POR	Nilton Varela
6	MF	POR	Afonso Taira
7	MF	POR	Pedro Nuno
8	MF	RSA	Sphephelo Sithole
9	FW	COL	Mateo Cassierra
10	MF	POR	Afonso Sousa
13	DF	POR	Jójó
14	DF	NED	Danny Henriques
15	FW	POR	Luís Mota

No.	Pos.	Nation	Player
16	MF	POR	César Sousa
18	FW	SEN	Alioune Ndour
19	MF	POR	Chico Teixeira
20	MF	POR	Rafael Santos
21	DF	RSA	Thibang Phete
23	MF	NED	Jordan van der Gaag
27	DF	NGR	Chima Akas
30	DF	BRA	Sandro
31	GK	POR	João Monteiro
33	DF	BFA	Trova Boni
38	FW	POR	Gonçalo Agrelos
39	GK	POR	Álvaro Ramalho

=== Other players under contract ===
Note: Flags indicate national team as defined under FIFA eligibility rules; some limited exceptions apply. Players may hold more than one non-FIFA nationality.

No.	Pos.	Nation	Player
—	MF	SRB	Andrija Luković

=== Out on loan ===
Note: Flags indicate national team as defined under FIFA eligibility rules; some limited exceptions apply. Players may hold more than one non-FIFA nationality.

No.	Pos.	Nation	Player
—	FW	POR	Kikas (at Doxa Katokopias FC until 30 June 2022)

== Pre-season and friendlies ==
Win Draw Loss Fixtures

4 August 2021 Friendly	Belenenses SAD (Portugal)	1–3	(Italy) Roma	Lagoa, Portugal
12:00 CEST (UTC+2)	Ndour 15'	Report	Džeko 20'; Zaniolo 56'; B. Mayoral 85'	Stadium: Estádio Municipal da Bela Vista; Referee: Pedro Ramalho (Portugal)

== Competitions ==
=== Overall record ===
Competition	First match	Last match	Starting round	Final position	Record							
Competition	First match	Last match	Starting round	Final position	Pld	W	D	L	GF	GA	GD	Win %
Primeira Liga	8 August 2021	15 May 2022	Matchday 1		33	5	10	18	23	55	−32	15.15
Taça de Portugal	16 October 2021	23 December 2021	Third round	Fifth round	3	2	1	0	8	5	+3	66.67
Taça da Liga	24 July 2021		First round	First round	1	0	0	1	0	1	−1	0.00
Total					37	7	11	19	31	61	−30	18.92

Last updated: 9 May 2022
Source: Soccerway

=== Primeira Liga ===
==== League table ====
Pos	Team	Pld	W	D	L	GF	GA	GD	Pts	Qualification or relegation
14	Vizela	34	7	12	15	37	58	−21	33	
15	Arouca	34	7	10	17	30	54	−24	31	
16	Moreirense (R)	34	7	8	19	33	51	−18	29	Qualification for the Relegation play-offs
17	Tondela (R)	34	7	7	20	41	67	−26	28	Relegation to Liga Portugal 2
18	B-SAD (R)	34	5	11	18	23	55	−32	26	Relegation to Liga Portugal 2

Source: Liga Portugal
Rules for classification: 1) Points; 2) Head-to-head points; 3) Head-to-head goal difference; 4) Head-to-head away goals scored; 5) Goal difference; 6) Matches won; 7) Goals scored; 8) Play-off.
(R) Relegated

==== Results summary ====
Overall								Home						Away					
Pld	W	D	L	GF	GA	GD	Pts	W	D	L	GF	GA	GD	W	D	L	GF	GA	GD
33	5	10	18	23	55	−32	25	5	3	9	15	30	−15	0	7	9	8	25	−17

Last updated: 9 May 2022.
Source: Liga Portugal

==== Results by round ====
Round	1	2	3	4	5	6	7	8	9	10	11	12	13	14	15	16	17	18	19	20	21	22	23	24	25	26	27	28	29	30	31	32	33	34
Ground	A	H	A	H	A	H	A	H	A	H	A	H	A	H	A	A	H	H	A	H	A	H	A	H	A	H	A	H	A	H	A	H	H	A
Result	L	L	L	D	D	D	D	L	D	W	L	L	L	L	L	L	W	L	D	L	L	W	L	L	D	D	D	W	L	W	D	L	L	
Position	12	16	18	18	18	17	17	17	18	14	16	17	18	18	18	18	18	18	18	18	18	18	18	18	18	18	18	18	18	18	18	18	18	

Updated to match(es) played on 9 May 2022. Source: Liga Portugal
A = Away; H = Home; W = Win; D = Draw; L = Loss

==== Matches ====
8 August 2021 1	Porto	2–0	Belenenses SAD	Porto
18:00 WEST (UTC+1)	Martínez 19'; Oliveira (yellow card) 26'; Díaz (yellow card) 53', (goal) 65'	Report	Boni (yellow card) 36'; Calila (yellow card) 47'; Teixeira (yellow card) 83'	Stadium: Estádio do Dragão; Attendance: 15,429; Referee: Gustavo Correia

16 August 2021 2	Belenenses SAD	1–2	Marítimo	Oeiras
21:15 WET (UTC±0)	Chima (yellow card) 41'; Ndour 45'; Phete (yellow card) 71'; Sithole (yellow card) 79'; Calila (yellow card) 90+4'	Report	Vidigal 13', (yellow card) 69'; Alipour 15', (yellow card) 64'; Costa (yellow card) 31'; Rossi (yellow card) 40'; Winck (yellow card) 89'	Stadium: Estádio Nacional; Attendance: 653; Referee: Claúdio Pereira

21 August 2021 3	Sporting CP	2–0	Belenenses SAD	Lisbon
20:30 WEST (UTC+1)	Inácio 7'; Palhinha 48'	Report		Stadium: Estádio José Alvalade; Attendance: 13,145; Referee: Manuel Oliveira

27 August 2021 4	Belenenses SAD	1–1	Moreirense	Leiria
19:00 WET (UTC±0)	Chima 29'; Ribeiro (yellow card) 38'; A. Sousa (yellow card) 56'; Boni (red card) 66'; Luiz Felipe (yellow card) 78'; Luković (yellow card) 79'; Carraça (yellow card) 86'; Phete (yellow card) 90+5'	Report	Vitória (yellow card) 45+3'; Yan (yellow card) 53'; Ibrahima (yellow card) 79'; André Luis 86'; Rosić (yellow card) 90+5'	Stadium: Estádio Municipal de Leiria; Attendance: 573; Referee: Fábio Melo

12 September 2021 5	Vitória de Guimarães	0–0	Belenenses SAD	Guimarães
20:30 WEST (UTC+1)		Report		Stadium: Estádio D. Afonso Henriques; Attendance: 10,462; Referee: Hélder Malheiro

18 September 2021 6	Belenenses SAD	1–1	Gil Vicente	Leiria
18:00 WET (UTC±0)	Sithole (yellow card) 35'; Carraça (yellow card) 38'; Safira 83', (yellow card) 86'	Report	Talocha (yellow card) 4'; Pedrinho (yellow card) 12'; Carvalho (yellow card) 25'; Aburjania 90+2'	Stadium: Estádio Municipal de Leiria; Attendance: 673; Referee: Miguel Nogueira

27 September 2021 7	Paços de Ferreira	2–2	Belenenses SAD	Paços de Ferreira
19:00 WEST (UTC+1)	Santos 12'; Rui Pires (yellow card) 16'; H. Ferreira 21'; Zé Uilton (yellow card) 78'; João Pedro (yellow card) 81'	Report	A. Sousa (yellow card) 24'; Ndour 60'; Safira 75'	Stadium: Estádio da Mata Real; Attendance: 1,307; Referee: Nuno Almeida

3 October 2021 8	Belenenses SAD	0–2	Tondela	Leiria
15:30 WET (UTC±0)	Chima (yellow card) 42'; A. Sousa (yellow card) 48'; Carraça (yellow card) 69'; C. Sousa (yellow card) 82'; Sithole (yellow card) 90+6'	Report	Augusto 3'; Borges (yellow card) 40'; Murillo 64'; Khacef (yellow card) 82'	Stadium: Estádio Municipal de Leiria; Attendance: 686; Referee: André Narciso

25 October 2021 9	Boavista	0–0	Belenenses SAD	Porto
21:15 WEST (UTC+1)		Report		Stadium: Estádio do Bessa; Attendance: 2,043; Referee: João Pinheiro

31 October 2021 10	Belenenses SAD	2–1	Santa Clara	Oeiras
18:00 WET (UTC±0)	Safira 43'; Nuno 90+3'	Report	Allano 90'	Stadium: Estádio Nacional; Attendance: 932; Referee: Vítor Ferreira

6 November 2021 11	Portimonense	2–0	Belenenses SAD	Portimão
18:00 WEST (UTC+1)	Nakajima 10'; Imbula (yellow card) 24'; Pedrão (yellow card) 54'; Lucas (yellow card) 63'; Aylton (yellow card) 73'; Samuel (yellow card) 78'; Pedro Sá 83'	Report	A. Sousa (yellow card) 2'; Chima (yellow card) 11'; Phete (yellow card) 78'; César Sousa (yellow card) 90+3'	Stadium: Estádio Municipal de Portimão; Attendance: 1,185; Referee: António Nobre

27 November 2021 12	Belenenses SAD	0–7	Benfica	Oeiras
20:30 WET (UTC±0)		Report	Kau 1' (o.g.); Seferovic 14', 39' (pen.); Weigl 27'; Núñez 32', 34', 45'	Stadium: Estádio Nacional; Attendance: 6,096; Referee: Manuel Mota
Note: The match ended in the 48th minute because Belenenses SAD were down to six players after playing with nine men in the first-half.

12 December 2021 14	Belenenses SAD	0–1	Estoril Praia	Oeiras
15:30 WET (UTC±0)	Nilton (yellow card) 80'; Carraça (yellow card) 87'	Report	Fonte 43'; David (yellow card) 89'	Stadium: Estádio Nacional; Attendance: 724; Referee: Hélder Malheiro

19 December 2021 15	Braga	1–0	Belenenses SAD	Braga
21:00 WET (UTC+0)	Moura 1'	Report		Stadium: Estádio Municipal de Braga; Attendance: 3,477; Referee: Luís Godinho

2 January 2022 13	Vizela	2–0	Belenenses SAD	Vizela
18:30 WET (UTC±0)	Cassiano (yellow card) 1', (goal) 33'; Kiko 12'; Mendez (yellow card) 61'	Report	Luiz Felipe (yellow card) 32'; Carraça (yellow card) 38'; Luković (yellow card) 40'; Diogo Calila (yellow card) 43'	Stadium: Estádio do FC Vizela; Attendance: 1,310; Referee: João Gonçalves

16 January 2022 18	Belenenses SAD	1–4	Porto	Oeiras
20:30 WET (UTC±0)	Camará 13'	Report	Evanilson 36', 58', 84'; Taremi 61'; Luis Díaz (penalty missed) 79'	Stadium: Estádio Nacional; Attendance: 6,992; Referee: Manuel Mota

23 January 2022 19	Marítimo	1–1	Belenenses SAD	Funchal
15:30 WET (UTC±0)	Tagueu (red card) 44'; Matheus Costa 45+4'	Report	Safira 13' (pen.); Tavares (yellow card) 26'; Akas (yellow card) 32'; Van der Gaag (yellow card) 45+3' (yellow-red card) 67'	Stadium: Estádio do Marítimo; Attendance: 3,624; Referee: Vitor Ferreira

2 February 2022 20	Belenenses SAD	1–4	Sporting CP	Oeiras
20:45 WET (UTC±0)	Camará 21'; Safira (yellow card) 36'; Luković (yellow card) 41'; Sousa (yellow card) 67'; Tavares (yellow card) 72'; Carraça (yellow card) 90'	Report	Paulinho 11', 47'; Porro 17'; Sarabia 45+2'; Neto (yellow card) 79'	Stadium: Estádio Nacional; Attendance: 4,463; Referee: Gustavo Correia

7 February 2022 21	Moreirense	4–1	Belenenses SAD	Moreira de Cónegos
21:15 WET (UTC±0)	Yan 18'; Martins (yellow card) 32'; Pablo 43'; André Luis 67'; Lacerda 88', (yellow card) 89'	Report	Camará 25'; Ndour (yellow card) 39', (red card) 40'	Stadium: Parque de Jogos Comendador Joaquim de Almeida Freitas; Attendance: 1,231; Referee: Nuno Almeida

13 February 2022 22	Belenenses SAD	1–0	Vitória de Guimarães	Oeiras
18:00 WET (UTC±0)	Carraça (yellow card) 34'; Safira 50'; Luiz Felipe (yellow card) 79'; Luković (yellow card) 83'; Nuno (yellow card) 88'; Akas (yellow card) 90'	Report	Borevković (yellow card) 9'; Händel (yellow card) 20'; Da Luz (yellow card) 90+2'; Quaresma (yellow card) 90+3'	Stadium: Estádio Nacional; Attendance: 1,089; Referee: Rui Costa

19 February 2022 23	Gil Vicente	2–0	Belenenses SAD	Barcelos
15:30 WET (UTC±0)	Cunha (yellow card) 3'; Calero 68'; Santana 78'; Bueno (yellow card) 90+4'	Report	Calila (yellow card) 37'; Safira (yellow card) 43'; Henriques (yellow card) 50'; Carraça (yellow card) 85'	Stadium: Estádio Cidade de Barcelos; Attendance: 2,862; Referee: João Pinheiro

25 February 2022 24	Belenenses SAD	0–2	Paços de Ferreira	Oeiras
20:15 WET (UTC±0)	Safira (yellow card) 45'; Akas (yellow card) 45+2'	Report	Baixinho (yellow card) 24'; Denílson 45+3' (pen.); H. Ferreira (yellow card) 54', (goal) 62'; A. Ferreira (yellow card) 57'; Santos (yellow card) 60'	Stadium: Estádio Nacional; Attendance: 1,287; Referee: Artur Soares Dias

7 March 2022 25	Tondela	1–1	Belenenses SAD	Tondela
20:15 WET (UTC±0)	Alves (yellow card) 25'; Hernando 32'; Agra (yellow card) 69'; Alves (yellow card) 87'; João Pedro (yellow card) 90+2'	Report	Henriques (yellow card) 26'; Camará 63'; Safira (yellow card) 78'; Sithole (yellow card) 90+1'	Stadium: Estádio João Cardoso; Attendance: 752; Referee: Miguel Nogueira

12 March 2022 26	Belenenses SAD	0–0	Boavista	Oeiras
20:30 WET (UTC±0)	Sambú (yellow card) 16'; Henriques (yellow card) 34'; Sousa (yellow card) 50'; Akas (yellow card) 61'	Report	Abascal (yellow card) 77'; Gorré (yellow card) 84'; García (yellow card) 90'	Stadium: Estádio Nacional; Attendance: 683; Referee: Nuno Miguel

19 March 2022 27	Santa Clara	0–0	Belenenses SAD	Ponta Delgada
18:00 WET (UTC±0)	Carvalho (yellow card) 45+2'; Boateng (yellow card) 86'; Henrique (yellow card) 90'	Report	Carraça (yellow card) 45'; Baraye (yellow card) 56'; Tavares (yellow card) 65'; Calila (yellow card) 89'; Sithole (yellow card) 89'	Stadium: Estádio de São Miguel; Attendance: 1,164; Referee: David Silva

2 April 2022 28	Belenenses SAD	2–0	Portimonense	Oeiras
15:30 WEST (UTC+1)	Safira 11' (pen.); Phete (yellow card) 32'; Baraye (yellow card) 75'; Sandro (yellow card) 75'; Calila (yellow card) 88'; Nuno 90+4'; Monteiro (yellow card) 90+6'	Report	Possignolo (yellow card) 10'; Willyan (red card) 37'; Pedrão (yellow card) 42'; Welinton Júnior (yellow card) 90'	Stadium: Estádio Nacional; Attendance: 1,409; Referee: Hélder Malheiro

9 April 2022 29	Benfica	3–1	Belenenses SAD	Lisbon
18:00 WEST (UTC+1)	Núñez 22', 54', 58'; Lazaro (yellow card) 88'	Report	Sousa 3'; Calila (yellow card) 33'; Sithole (yellow card) 45+2'; Camacho (yellow card) 48'; Tavares (yellow card) 69'; Varela (yellow card) 77'; Licá (yellow card) 85'; Henriques (yellow card) 90+3'	Stadium: Estádio da Luz; Attendance: 34,183; Referee: Gustavo Correia

16 April 2022 30	Belenenses SAD	1–0	Vizela	Oeiras
18:00 WEST (UTC+1)	Baraye (yellow card) 20', (goal) 29'; Sambú (yellow card) 35'	Report	Ofori (yellow card) 56'; Anderson (yellow card) 77'	Stadium: Estádio Nacional; Attendance: 1,384; Referee: Nuno Miguel

24 April 2022 31	Estoril	2–2	Belenenses SAD	Estoril
18:00 WEST (UTC+1)	Arthur (yellow card) 26'; Rosier 27', (yellow card) 70' (yellow-red card) 90+1'; Joãozinho (yellow card) 30'; Franco 45+1' (pen.), (yellow card) 65', (red card) 90+7'; Ferraresi (yellow card) 65'; Lourenço (yellow card) 90+3'; Baró (red card) 90+6'	Report	Carraça (yellow card) 26'; Safira 66' (pen.); Sousa (yellow card) 80'; Tavares (yellow card) 83'; Sandro 90+6'; Camará (red card) 90+7'; Calila (red card) 90+7'	Stadium: Estádio António Coimbra da Mota; Attendance: 1,425; Referee: Tiago Martins

30 April 2022 32	Belenenses SAD	0–1	Braga	Oeiras
21:00 WEST (UTC+1)	Henriques (yellow card) 12'; Akas (yellow card) 34'; Baraye (yellow card) 81'; Sandro (red card) 83'; Sithole (red card) 90+4'	Report	Carmo (yellow card) 61'; Tormena (yellow card) 82'; R. Horta 90'; Couto (yellow card) 90+2'	Stadium: Estádio Nacional; Attendance: 1,834; Referee: André Narciso

9 May 2022 33	Belenenses SAD	2–3	Famalicão	Oeiras
20:15 WEST (UTC+1)	Tavares (yellow card) 26'; Alex 44' (o.g.); Sousa (yellow card) 90+2'; Baraye 90+3'; Carraça (yellow card) 90+6'	Report	Marín 67'; Rodrigues 76'; Banza (yellow card) 90+2'; Pêpê 90+5'	Stadium: Estádio Nacional; Attendance: 1,173; Referee: Hélder Malheiro

15 May 2022 34	Arouca	v	Belenenses SAD	Arouca
--:-- WEST (UTC+1)				Stadium: Estádio Municipal de Arouca

=== Taça de Portugal ===
16 October 2021 Third round	Berço	1–2 (a.e.t.)	Belenenses SAD	Guimarães
15:00 WEST (UTC+1)	Lopes 72'	Report	Sousa 40'; Ndour 120'	Stadium: Campo Gémeos Castro; Referee: Hugo Silva

21 November 2021 Fourth round	Caldas	3–5	Belenenses SAD	Caldas da Rainha
14:00 WET (UTC±0)	Rodrigues 6' (pen.), 32'; Militão 58'	Report	Luković 3'; Nuno 18', 52'; Calila 54'; Sousa 90'	Stadium: Campo da Mata; Referee: David Silva

23 December 2021 Fifth round	Rio Ave	1–1 (a.e.t.) (6–5 p)	Belenenses SAD	Vila do Conde
17:00 WET (UTC±0)	Hugo 42'	Report	Nuno 9'	Stadium: Estádio dos Arcos; Referee: Antonio Nobre

=== Taça da Liga ===
24 July 2021 First round	Mafra	1–0	Belenenses SAD	Mafra
15:30 WEST (UTC+1)	Andrezinho 22'	Report		Stadium: Estádio Municipal de Mafra; Attendance: 0 Referee: João António Gonçalves
