= 2021–22 C.D. Tondela season =

C.D. Tondela
2021–22 season
- Chairman: David Belenguer
- Manager: Pako Ayestarán
- Stadium: Estádio João Cardoso
- Primeira Liga: 17th (relegated)
- Taça de Portugal: Runners-up
- Taça da Liga: First round
- Top goalscorer: League: João Pedro (7); All: Juan Manuel Boselli (8)
| Home colours | Away colours | Third colours |

The 2021–22 season was the 89th season in the existence of C.D. Tondela and the club's ninth consecutive season in the top flight of Portuguese football. In addition to the domestic league, C.D. Tondela participated in this season's editions of the Taça de Portugal and the Taça da Liga.

== Players ==
=== First-team squad ===
As of 04 July 2022

Note: Flags indicate national team as defined under FIFA eligibility rules; some limited exceptions apply. Players may hold more than one non-FIFA nationality.

| No. | Pos. | Nation | Player |
|---|---|---|---|
| 3 | DF | BRA | Neto Borges (on loan from Genk) |
| 4 | DF | POR | Jota Gonçalves |
| 5 | DF | FRA | Modibo Sagnan (on loan from Real Sociedad) |
| 7 | FW | POR | Salvador Agra |
| 8 | MF | POR | João Pedro |
| 10 | FW | ESP | Javier Avilés (on loan from Leganés) |
| 11 | FW | URU | Juan Manuel Boselli (on loan from Defensor) |
| 17 | FW | AZE | Renat Dadashov (on loan from Wolverhampton) |
| 19 | DF | POR | Tiago Almeida |
| 21 | MF | ESP | Iker Undabarrena |

| No. | Pos. | Nation | Player |
|---|---|---|---|
| 23 | DF | BRA | Bebeto |
| 28 | MF | POR | Tiago Dantas (on loan from Benfica) |
| 29 | FW | BRA | Daniel dos Anjos |
| 34 | DF | POR | Ricardo Alves |
| 38 | MF | ITA | Simone Muratore (on loan from Atalanta) |
| 72 | DF | POR | Eduardo Quaresma (on loan from Sporting) |
| 88 | GK | POR | Pedro Trigueira |
| 99 | GK | SEN | Babacar Niasse |

=== Reserve team ===
As of 16 January 2022

Note: Flags indicate national team as defined under FIFA eligibility rules; some limited exceptions apply. Players may hold more than one non-FIFA nationality.

| No. | Pos. | Nation | Player |
|---|---|---|---|
| 70 | FW | POR | Cuba |
| 75 | MF | POR | Martim Boloto |

| No. | Pos. | Nation | Player |
|---|---|---|---|
| 95 | DF | POR | Rafael Alcobia |

=== Other players under contract ===
As of 16 January 2022

Note: Flags indicate national team as defined under FIFA eligibility rules; some limited exceptions apply. Players may hold more than one non-FIFA nationality.

| No. | Pos. | Nation | Player |
|---|---|---|---|
| — | FW | HON | Rubilio Castillo |

=== Out on loan ===
As of 16 January 2022

Note: Flags indicate national team as defined under FIFA eligibility rules; some limited exceptions apply. Players may hold more than one non-FIFA nationality.

| No. / Pos. / Nation / Player; 1 / GK / POR / Joel Sousa (at Oleiros until 30 June 2022) | No. / Pos. / Nation / Player; — / FW / CRO / Tomislav Štrkalj (at Hrvatski Dragovoljac until 30 June 2022) |

== Pre-season and friendlies ==
Win Draw Loss Fixtures

== Competitions ==
=== Overall record ===
| Competition | First match | Last match | Starting round | Final position | Record | | | | | | | |
| Competition | First match | Last match | Starting round | Final position | Pld | W | D | L | GF | GA | GD | Win % |
|---|---|---|---|---|---|---|---|---|---|---|---|---|
| Primeira Liga | 8 August 2021 | 14 May 2022 | Matchday 1 | 17th | 34 | 7 | 7 | 20 | 41 | 67 | −26 | 20.59 |
| Taça de Portugal | 16 October 2021 | 22 May 2022 | Third round | Runners-up | 7 | 5 | 1 | 1 | 14 | 7 | +7 | 71.43 |
| Taça da Liga | 24 July 2021 | | First round | First round | 1 | 0 | 0 | 1 | 0 | 1 | −1 | 0.00 |
| Total | | | | | 42 | 12 | 8 | 22 | 55 | 75 | −20 | 28.57 |

Last updated: 22 May 2022
Source: Soccerway

=== Primeira Liga ===
==== League table ====
| Pos | Team | Pld | W | D | L | GF | GA | GD | Pts | Qualification or relegation |
|---|---|---|---|---|---|---|---|---|---|---|
| 14 | Vizela | 34 | 7 | 12 | 15 | 37 | 58 | −21 | 33 | |
| 15 | Arouca | 34 | 7 | 10 | 17 | 30 | 54 | −24 | 31 | |
| 16 | Moreirense (R) | 34 | 7 | 8 | 19 | 33 | 51 | −18 | 29 | Qualification for the Relegation play-offs |
| 17 | Tondela (R) | 34 | 7 | 7 | 20 | 41 | 67 | −26 | 28 | Relegation to Liga Portugal 2 |
| 18 | B-SAD (R) | 34 | 5 | 11 | 18 | 23 | 55 | −32 | 26 | Relegation to Liga Portugal 2 |

Source: Liga Portugal
Rules for classification: 1) Points; 2) Head-to-head points; 3) Head-to-head goal difference; 4) Head-to-head away goals scored; 5) Goal difference; 6) Matches won; 7) Goals scored; 8) Play-off.
(R) Relegated

==== Results summary ====
| Overall | | | | | | | | Home | | | | | | Away | | | | | |
| Pld | W | D | L | GF | GA | GD | Pts | W | D | L | GF | GA | GD | W | D | L | GF | GA | GD |
|---|---|---|---|---|---|---|---|---|---|---|---|---|---|---|---|---|---|---|---|
| 0 | 0 | 0 | 0 | 0 | 0 | 0 | 0 | 0 | 0 | 0 | 0 | 0 | 0 | 0 | 0 | 0 | 0 | 0 | 0 |

Last updated: August 2021.
Source: Liga Portugal

==== Results by round ====
| Round | 1 | 2 | 3 | 4 | 5 | 6 | 7 | 8 | 9 | 10 | 11 | 12 | 13 | 14 | 15 | 16 | 17 | 18 | 19 | 20 | 21 | 22 | 23 | 24 | 25 | 26 | 27 | 28 | 29 | 30 |
|---|---|---|---|---|---|---|---|---|---|---|---|---|---|---|---|---|---|---|---|---|---|---|---|---|---|---|---|---|---|---|
| Ground | H | A | H | A | H | A | H | A | H | A | H | A | A | H | H | H | A | A | H | A | H | A | H | A | H | A | H | A | H | A |
| Result | W | L | L | L | L | L | W | W | L | L | W | L | L | L | L | D | L | W | L | L | L | L | D | L | D | L | D | W | L | L |
| Position | 3 | 6 | 11 | 14 | 16 | 16 | 13 | 10 | 11 | 11 | 9 | 10 | 9 | 10 | 11 | 13 | 13 | 12 | 15 | 13 | 14 | 14 | 16 | 16 | 16 | 16 | 16 | 16 | 16 | 16 |

Updated to match(es) played on 16 April 2022. Source: Liga Portugal
A = Away; H = Home; W = Win; D = Draw; L = Loss

==== Matches ====
| 8 August 2021 1 | Tondela | 3–0 | Santa Clara | Tondela |
| 15:30 WEST (UTC+1) | | Report | | Stadium: Estádio João Cardoso; Attendance: 764; Referee: João Gonçalves |

| 14 August 2021 2 | Vizela | 2–1 | Tondela | Vizela |
| 15:30 WEST (UTC+1) | | Report | | Stadium: Estádio do FC Vizela; Attendance: 613; Referee: Manuel Oliveira |

| 22 August 2021 3 | Tondela | 0–3 | Portimonense | Tondela |
| 15:30 WEST (UTC+1) | | Report | Beto 35'; Boa Morte 45+1' (pen.); Candé 80' | Stadium: Estádio João Cardoso; Attendance: 906; Referee: Luís Godinho |

| 29 August 2021 4 | Benfica | 2–1 | Tondela | Lisbon |
| 18:00 WEST (UTC+1) | Pizzi (yellow card) 9'; Everton (yellow card) 50'; Silva 71'; Gilberto 88' | Report | Khacef (yellow card) 19'; Agra 22'; Niasse (yellow card) 35'; Undabarrena (yellow card) 56' | Stadium: Estádio da Luz; Attendance: 19,425; Referee: Tiago Martins |

| 13 September 2021 5 | Tondela | 1–2 | Estoril | Tondela |
| 21:15 WEST (UTC+1) | | Report | | Stadium: Estádio João Cardoso; Attendance: 477; Referee: Claúdio Pereira |

| 20 September 2021 6 | Braga | 3–1 | Tondela | Braga |
| 21:15 WEST (UTC+1) | Medeiros 80', 90'; R. Horta 83' | Report | Dadashov 86' | Stadium: Estádio Municipal de Braga; Attendance: 5,164; Referee: João Pinheiro |

| 25 September 2021 7 | Tondela | 3–2 | Famalicão | Tondela |
| 20:30 WEST (UTC+1) | | Report | | Stadium: Estádio João Cardoso; Attendance: 439; Referee: João Gonçalves |

| 3 October 2021 8 | Belenenses SAD | 0–2 | Tondela | Oeiras |
| 15:30 WEST (UTC+1) | Chima (yellow card) 42'; A. Sousa (yellow card) 48'; Carraça (yellow card) 69'; C. Sousa (yellow card) 82'; Sithole (yellow card) 90+6' | Report | Augusto 3'; Borges (yellow card) 40'; Murillo 64'; Khacef (yellow card) 82' | Stadium: Estádio Nacional; Attendance: 686; Referee: André Narciso |

| 23 October 2021 9 | Tondela | 1–3 | Porto | Tondela |
| 18:00 WEST (UTC+1) | Borges 4' | Report | Taremi 19', 43', 79' | Stadium: Estádio João Cardoso; Attendance: 2,898; Referee: Fábio Veríssimo |

| 29 October 2021 10 | Arouca | 2–0 | Tondela | Arouca |
| 20:15 WEST (UTC+1) | Basso 31' (pen.); Bukia 68' | Report | | Stadium: Estádio Municipal de Arouca; Attendance: 574; Referee: Luís Godinho |

| 7 November 2021 11 | Tondela | 4–2 | Marítimo | Tondela |
| 14:00 WET (UTC±0) | | Report | | Stadium: Estádio João Cardoso; Attendance: 700; Referee: Gustavo Correia |

| 28 November 2021 12 | Sporting CP | 2–0 | Tondela | Lisbon |
| 18:00 WET (UTC±0) | Sarabia 10'; Paulinho 50' | Report | | Stadium: Estádio José Alvalade; Attendance: 34,058; Referee: Hugo Miguel |

| 11 December 2021 13 | Vitória de Guimarães | 5–2 | Tondela | Guimarães |
| 18:00 WET (UTC±0) | | Report | | Stadium: Estádio D. Afonso Henriques; Attendance: 6,354; Referee: Fábio Melo |

| 18 December 2021 14 | Tondela | 0–1 | Paços de Ferreira | Tondela |
| 15:30 WET (UTC±0) | | Report | | Stadium: Estádio João Cardoso; Attendance: 672; Referee: Vítor Ferreira |

| 28 December 2021 15 | Tondela | 0–3 | Gil Vicente | Tondela |
| 17:00 WET (UTC±0) | | Report | | Stadium: Estádio João Cardoso; Attendance: 499; Referee: Gustavo Correia |

| 3 January 2022 16 | Tondela | 2–1 | Moreirense | Tondela |
| 20:15 WET (UTC±0) | | Report | | Stadium: Estádio João Cardoso; Attendance: 463; Referee: Hugo Silva |

| 8 January 2022 17 | Boavista | 1–1 | Tondela | Porto |
| 20:30 WET (UTC±0) | | Report | | Stadium: Estádio do Bessa; Attendance: 2,869; Referee: Miguel Nogueira |

| 16 January 2022 18 | Santa Clara | 2–2 | Tondela | Ponta Delgada |
| 15:30 WET (UTC±0) | | Report | | Stadium: Estádio de São Miguel; Attendance: 263; Referee: Claúdio Pereira |

| 22 January 2022 19 | Tondela | 2–3 | Vizela | Tondela |
| 18:00 WET (UTC±0) | | Report | | Stadium: Estádio João Cardoso; Attendance: 829; Referee: Hélder Malheiro |

| 30 January 2022 20 | Portimonense | 1–2 | Tondela | Portimão |
| 15:30 WET (UTC±0) | | Report | | Stadium: Estádio Municipal de Portimão; Attendance: 848; Referee: João Gonçalves |

| 7 February 2022 21 | Tondela | 1–3 | Benfica | Tondela |
| 19:00 WET (UTC±0) | Borges (yellow card) 39' (yellow-red card) 65'; Quaresma 88' | Report | Everton 23'; Núñez 34'; Ramos 53' | Stadium: Estádio João Cardoso; Attendance: 3,973; Referee: João Pinheiro |

| 12 February 2022 22 | Estoril | 1–0 | Tondela | Estoril |
| 20:30 WET (UTC±0) | | Report | | Stadium: Estádio António Coimbra da Mota; Attendance: 1,182; Referee: Vítor Ferreira |

| 20 February 2022 23 | Tondela | 0–1 | Braga | Tondela |
| 20:45 WET (UTC±0) | | Report | R. Horta 58' | Stadium: Estádio João Cardoso; Attendance: 1,061; Referee: Tiago Martins |

| 26 February 2022 24 | Famalicão | 2–1 | Tondela | Vila Nova de Famalicão |
| 15:30 WET (UTC±0) | | Report | | Stadium: Estádio Municipal 22 de Junho; Attendance: 4,388; Referee: Hélder Malheiro |

| 7 March 2022 25 | Tondela | 1–1 | Belenenses SAD | Tondela |
| 20:15 WET (UTC±0) | M. Alves (yellow card) 25'; Hernando 32'; Agra (yellow card) 69'; R. Alves (yellow card) 87'; João Pedro (yellow card) 90+2' | Report | Henriques (yellow card) 26'; Camará 63'; Safira (yellow card) 78'; Sithole (yellow card) 90+1' | Stadium: Estádio João Cardoso; Attendance: 752; Referee: Miguel Nogueira |

| 13 March 2022 26 | Porto | 4–0 | Tondela | Porto |
| 18:00 WET (UTC±0) | Taremi 45' (pen.); Galeno 73'; Vieira 76'; Conceição 79' | Report | | Stadium: Estádio do Dragão; Attendance: 32,609; Referee: Gustavo Correia |

| 19 March 2022 27 | Tondela | 2–2 | Arouca | Tondela |
| 15:30 WET (UTC±0) | Quaresma 16'; Agra 45+4' | Report | A. Silva 4', 69' | Stadium: Estádio João Cardoso; Attendance: 2,186; Referee: João Pinheiro |

| 3 April 2022 28 | Marítimo | 1–3 | Tondela | Funchal |
| 15:30 WET (UTC±0) | | Report | | Stadium: Estádio do Marítimo; Attendance: 2,511; Referee: Manuel Mota |

| 9 April 2022 29 | Tondela | 1–3 | Sporting CP | Tondela |
| 20:30 WEST (UTC+1) | Hernando 71' | Report | Inácio 29'; Sarabia 33', 69' (pen.) | Stadium: Estádio João Cardoso; Attendance: 4,745; Referee: Luís Godinho |

| 16 April 2022 30 | Moreirense | 2–0 | Tondela | Moreira de Cónegos |
| 15:30 WEST (UTC+1) | | Report | | Stadium: Parque Joaquim de Almeida Freitas; Attendance: 2,640; Referee: Artur Soares Dias |

=== Taça de Portugal ===
| 16 October 2021 Third round | Camacha | 1–2 | Tondela | Madeira |
| 15:00 WEST (UTC+1) | Fraga 5' | Report | Hernando 3'; Agra 90' | Stadium: Campo Municipal da Nogueira; Referee: Claudio Pereira |

| 22 November 2021 Fourth round | Tondela | 3–1 | Leixões | Tondela |
| 19:45 WET (UTC±0) | Boselli 36'; Dantas 84'; Murillo 90+1' | Report | Bolgado 90' | Stadium: Estádio João Cardoso; Referee: Miguel Nogueira |

| 21 December 2021 Fifth round | Tondela | 3–1 | Estoril | Tondela |
| 18:45 WET (UTC±0) | Dantas 45'; Boselli 51'; Dos Anjos 68' | Report | Acevedo 18' (pen.) | Stadium: Estádio João Cardoso; Referee: João Pinheiro |

| 12 January 2022 Quarter-finals | Rio Ave | 0–1 (a.e.t.) | Tondela | Vila do Conde |
| 18:45 WET (UTC±0) | | Report | Dadashov 96' | Stadium: Estádio dos Arcos; Referee: Artur Soares Dias |

| 3 March 2022 Semi-finals; First leg | Tondela | 3–0 | Mafra | Tondela |
| 20:15 WET (UTC±0) | Dantas 38'; Hernando 66'; Borges 75' | Report | | Stadium: Estádio João Cardoso; Referee: Vitor Ferreira |

| 20 April 2022 Semi-finals; Second leg | Mafra | 1–1 (1–4 agg.) | Tondela | Mafra |
| 20:15 WEST (UTC+1) | Pacheco 45' | Report | Boselli 89' | Stadium: Estádio Municipal de Mafra; Referee: Manuel Oliveira |

| 22 May 2022 Final | Porto | 3–1 | Tondela | Oeiras |
| 17:15 WEST (UTC+1) | Taremi 22' (pen.), 74', (penalty missed) 66'; Vitinha 52' | Report | Borges 73' | Stadium: Estádio Nacional; Referee: Rui Costa |

=== Taça da Liga ===
| 24 July 2021 First round | Tondela | 0–1 | Gil Vicente | Tondela |
| 11:00 WEST (UTC+1) | | Report | Vitor 87' | Stadium: Estádio João Cardoso; Attendance: 0 Referee: Miguel Nogueira |
