= 2023–24 C.D. Tondela season =

C.D. Tondela
2023–24 season
- Manager: Tozé Marreco (until 10 April); Sérgio Gaminha (from 10 April)
- Stadium: Estádio João Cardoso
- Liga Portugal 2: 6th
- Taça de Portugal: Fifth round
- Taça da Liga: Third round
- Top goalscorer: League: Roberto (10); All: Roberto (12)

The 2023–24 season was C.D. Tondela's 91st season in existence and second consecutive in the Liga Portugal 2. They also competed in the Taça de Portugal and Taça da Liga.

== Players ==
=== First-team squad ===
As of 7 October 2023

Note: Flags indicate national team as defined under FIFA eligibility rules; some limited exceptions apply. Players may hold more than one non-FIFA nationality.

No.	Pos.	Nation	Player
1	GK	POR	Joel Sousa
2	DF	BRA	Bebeto
4	DF	POR	Jota Gonçalves
6	MF	POR	André Ceitil
7	FW	POR	António Xavier
8	MF	CPV	Hélder Tavares
9	FW	BRA	Daniel dos Anjos
10	FW	POR	Rui Gomes (on loan from Portimonense)
11	MF	POR	Costinha
13	DF	SEN	Abdoulaye Ba
15	MF	RSA	Yaya Sithole
16	DF	POR	Luís Rocha
17	FW	POR	Roberto
18	FW	POR	Cuba

No.	Pos.	Nation	Player
19	DF	POR	Tiago Almeida
21	FW	BRA	Pedro Maranhão
22	GK	BRA	Léo Navacchio
23	FW	POR	Rodrigo Cascavel
24	GK	POR	Iuri Miguel
26	DF	BRA	Lucas Barros (on loan from Gil Vicente)
33	FW	BRA	Gustavo França (on loan from São Bernardo)
34	DF	POR	Ricardo Alves (captain)
41	GK	POR	Ricardo Silva
44	DF	BRA	Lucas Mezenga (on loan from Botafogo)
55	FW	BRA	Luan Farias
77	FW	POR	Luisinho
97	MF	BRA	Cícero

== Transfers ==
=== In ===
Pos.	Player	Transferred from	Fee	Date	Source
MF	(Portugal) [[ ]]	(Portugal)	Free	July 2023	

=== Out ===
Pos.	Player	Transferred to	Fee	Date	Source
MF	(Portugal) [[ ]]	(Portugal)	Free	July 2023	

== Pre-season and friendlies ==
Win Draw Loss Fixtures

11 July 2023 Friendly	Tondela (Portugal)	2–1	(Portugal) Canelas 2010

15 July 2023 Friendly	Tondela (Portugal)	1–1	(Portugal) Académica de Coimbra

18 July 2023 Friendly	Oliveirense (Portugal)	2–3	(Portugal) Tondela

22 July 2023 Torneio de Verão da Póvoa de Varzim	Vitória de Guimarães (Portugal)	1–1 (2–4 p)	(Portugal) Tondela

23 July 2023 Torneio de Verão da Póvoa de Varzim	Benfica B (Portugal)	3–0	(Portugal) Tondela
	Varela 16'; Tavares 78', 81'

1 August 2023 Friendly	Tondela (Portugal)	4–1	(Portugal) CD Gouveia

== Competitions ==
=== Overall record ===
Competition	First match	Last match	Starting round	Final position	Record							
Competition	First match	Last match	Starting round	Final position	Pld	W	D	L	GF	GA	GD	Win %
Liga Portugal 2	12 August 2023	19 May 2024	Matchday 1	6th	34	12	13	9	46	43	+3	35.29
Taça de Portugal	24 September 2023	9 January 2024	Second round	Fifth round	4	2	1	1	8	6	+2	50.00
Taça da Liga	29 July 2023	23 December 2023	First round		4	1	1	2	2	3	−1	25.00
Total					42	15	15	12	56	52	+4	35.71

Source: Soccerway

=== Liga Portugal 2 ===
==== League table ====
Pos	Team	Pld	W	D	L	GF	GA	GD	Pts
4	Marítimo	34	18	10	6	52	29	+23	64 (Note: Ranked on head-to-head: AVS 3–2 Marítimo, Marítimo 0–1 AVS)
5	Paços de Ferreira	34	14	10	10	42	35	+7	52
6	Tondela	34	12	13	9	46	43	+3	49
7	Torreense	34	13	9	12	40	37	+3	48
8	Benfica B (Note: Ineligible for promotion)	34	12	9	13	48	48	0	45

Source: Liga Portugal 2
Rules for classification: 1) Points; 2) Head-to-head points; 3) Head-to-head goal difference; 4) Head-to-head away goals scored; 5) Goal difference; 6) Matches won; 7) Goals scored; 8) Play-off.

==== Results summary ====
Overall								Home						Away					
Pld	W	D	L	GF	GA	GD	Pts	W	D	L	GF	GA	GD	W	D	L	GF	GA	GD
34	12	13	9	46	43	+3	49	6	5	6	23	23	0	6	8	3	23	20	+3

Source: Liga Portugal SABSEG

==== Results by round ====
Round	1
Ground	
Result	
Position	

Source: Liga Portugal SABSEG
A = Away; H = Home; W = Win; D = Draw; L = Loss

==== Matches ====
The league fixtures were unveiled on 5 July 2023.

13 August 2023 1	Porto B	1–1	Tondela	Porto

19 August 2023 2	Tondela	2–2	Academico Viseu	Tondela
				Stadium: Estádio Dr. Magalhães Pessoa

26 August 2023 3	Paços de Ferreira	5–1	Tondela	Paços de Ferreira

1 September 2023 4	Tondela	0–1	CF Os Belenenses	Tondela
				Stadium: Estádio Dr. Magalhães Pessoa

16 September 2023 5	Tondela	2–1	Mafra	Tondela
				Stadium: Estádio Dr. Magalhães Pessoa

1 October 2023 6	União de Leiria	2–2	Tondela	Leiria
				Stadium: Estádio Dr. Magalhães Pessoa

17 February 2024 22	Mafra	1–3	Tondela	Mafra

24 February 2024 23	Tondela	1–1	União de Leiria	Tondela
				Stadium: Estádio Dr. Magalhães Pessoa

3 March 2024 24	Leixões	1–1	Tondela	Matosinhos
				Stadium: Estádio do Mar

10 March 2024 25	Tondela	0–3	Marítimo	Tondela
				Stadium: Estádio Dr. Magalhães Pessoa

15 March 2024 26	Torreense	0–1	Tondela	Torres Vedras
18:00				Stadium: Campo Manuel Marques; Referee: Vitor Ferreira

30 March 2024 27	Tondela	v	Vilaverdense	Tondela
				Stadium: Estádio Dr. Magalhães Pessoa

=== Taça de Portugal ===
24 September 2023 Second round	Sporting de Pombal	0–5	Tondela	Pombal
15:00 WEST (UTC+1)			Farias 9'; Gonçalves 12'; Roberto 68'; Cuba 77', 90+4'	Stadium: Estádio Municipal de Pombal; Referee: David Silva

22 October 2023 Third round	Tondela	2–1	SU 1º Dezembro	Tondela
17:00 WEST (UTC+1)	Ba 7' (pen.); Roberto 47'		Castro 52'; Simões (red card) 90+3'	Stadium: Estádio João Cardoso

26 November 2023 Fourth round	Torreense	1–1 (a.e.t.) (2–4 p)	Tondela	Torres Vedras
17:00 WET (UTC±0)	Guzmán 46'		Roberto 68' (pen.)	Stadium: Estádio Manuel Marques

=== Taça da Liga ===
29 July 2023 First round	Santa Clara	0–0 (2–4 p)	Tondela	Ponta Delgada
15:30 WEST (UTC+1)				Stadium: Estádio de São Miguel

9 September 2023 Second round	Vitória de Guimarães	0–1	Tondela	Guimarães
20:30 WEST (UTC+1)			Dos Anjos 56'	Stadium: Estádio D. Afonso Henriques
