= 2022 Taça de Portugal final =

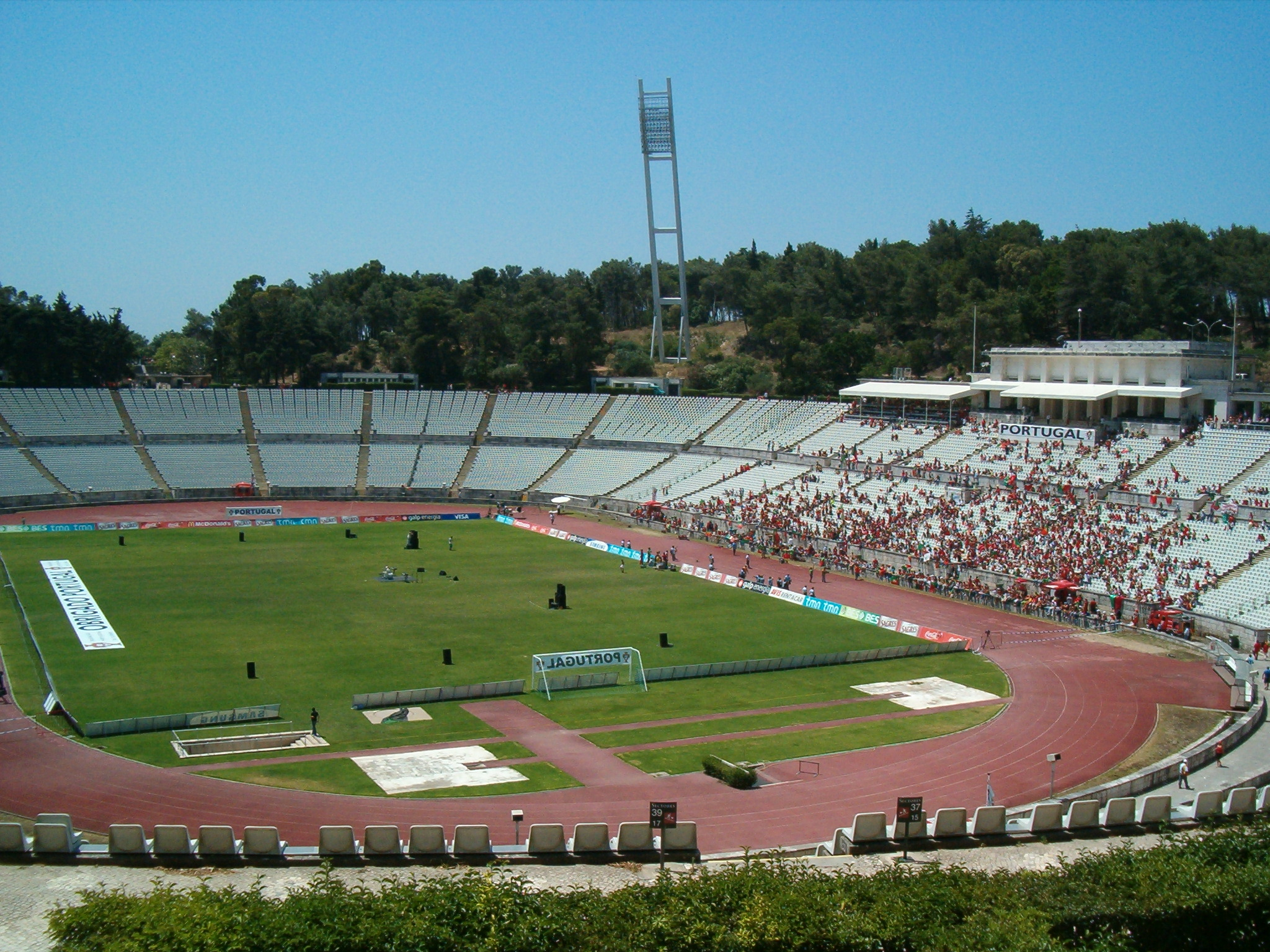
- Estádio Nacional
- Event: 2021–22 Taça de Portugal
Porto	Tondela
3	1
- Date: 22 May 2022
- Venue: Estádio Nacional, Oeiras
- Man of the Match: Mehdi Taremi (Porto)
- Fair Player of the Match: Eduardo Quaresma (Tondela)
- Referee: Rui Costa

The 2022 Taça de Portugal final was the last match of the 2021–22 Taça de Portugal, which decided the winner of the 82nd season of the Taça de Portugal, the premier knockout cup competition in Portuguese football. It was played at the Estádio Nacional in Oeiras, between Primeira Liga sides Porto and Tondela.

Tondela qualified for the first time in its history to the Portuguese Cup final after beating second-tier side Mafra in the semi-finals. Porto return to dispute its 32nd final, two years after winning the 2020 final over Benfica. The defending champions Braga were knocked out in the fifth round by Vizela.

== Route to the final ==
Porto		Round	Tondela
Opponent	Result	2021–22 Taça de Portugal	Opponent	Result
Sintrense	5–0 (A)	Third round	Camacha	2–1 (A)
Feirense	5–1 (H)	Fourth round	Leixões	3–1 (H)
Benfica	3–0 (H)	Fifth round	Estoril	3–1 (H)
Vizela	3–1 (A)	Quarter-finals	Rio Ave	1–0 (a.e.t.) (A)
Sporting CP	2–1 (A)	Semi-finals	Mafra	3–0 (H)
Sporting CP	1–0 (H)	Semi-finals	Mafra	1–1 (A)

Note: H = home fixture, A = away fixture

== Match ==
=== Details ===
22 May 2022
17:15 WEST

Porto	3–1	Tondela
Taremi 22' (pen.), 74'; Vitinha 52'	Report	Borges 73'

Estádio Nacional, Oeiras
Referee: Rui Costa

Porto	Tondela

GK	1	(Argentina) Agustín Marchesín
RB	23	(Portugal) João Mário
CB	19	(Democratic Republic of the Congo) Chancel Mbemba
CB	3	(Portugal) Pepe (c)
LB	12	(Nigeria) Zaidu Sanusi
RW	25	(Portugal) Otávio
CM	16	(Serbia) Marko Grujić	(yellow card) 77'	(substituted off) 83'
LW	20	(Portugal) Vitinha
LF	11	(Brazil) Pepê		(substituted off) 76'
CF	30	(Brazil) Evanilson		(substituted off) 72'
RF	9	(Iran) Mehdi Taremi		(substituted off) 84'
Substitutes:
GK	99	(Portugal) Diogo Costa
DF	2	(Portugal) Fábio Cardoso
MF	8	(Colombia) Mateus Uribe		(substituted on) 83'
MF	50	(Portugal) Fábio Vieira
FW	10	(Portugal) Francisco Conceição	(yellow card) 86'	(substituted on) 76'
FW	13	(Brazil) Galeno		(substituted on) 72'
FW	29	(Spain) Toni Martínez		(substituted on) 84'
Manager:
(Portugal) Sérgio Conceição

GK	99	(Mauritania) Babacar Niasse
RB	19	(Portugal) Tiago Almeida		(substituted off) 69'
CB	72	(Portugal) Eduardo Quaresma
CB	33	(Brazil) Marcelo Alves	(yellow card) 17'
CB	5	(France) Modibo Sagnan
LB	3	(Brazil) Neto Borges
RM	7	(Portugal) Salvador Agra (c)		(substituted off) 82'
CM	6	(Brazil) Pedro Augusto		(substituted off) 56'
CM	21	(Spain) Iker Undabarrena		(substituted off) 69'
LM	70	(Portugal) Rafael Barbosa	(yellow card) 83'
CF	29	(Brazil) Daniel dos Anjos		(substituted off) 56'
Substitutes:
GK	88	(Portugal) Pedro Trigueira
DF	23	(Brazil) Bebeto		(substituted on) 69'
DF	34	(Portugal) Ricardo Alves
MF	8	(Portugal) João Pedro		(substituted on) 56'
MF	28	(Portugal) Tiago Dantas		(substituted on) 69'
FW	11	(Uruguay) Juan Manuel Boselli		(substituted on) 82'
FW	17	(Azerbaijan) Renat Dadashov		(substituted on) 56'
Manager:
(Portugal) Nuno Campos

Man of the Match:
Mehdi Taremi (Porto)
Fair Player of the Match:
Eduardo Quaresma (Tondela)

Assistant referees:
Nuno Manso
João Bessa Silva
Fourth official:
Cláudio Pereira
Video assistant referee:
Bruno Esteves
Assistant video assistant referees:
Ricardo Santos
Vítor Ferreira

Match rules

- 90 minutes
- 30 minutes of extra time if necessary
- Penalty shoot-out if scores still level
- Seven named substitutes
- Maximum of five substitutions, with a sixth allowed in extra time (Note: Each team was given only three opportunities to make substitutions, with a fourth opportunity in extra time, excluding substitutions made at half-time, before the start of extra time and at half-time in extra time.)

== Post-match ==
The winners qualify for the 2022–23 UEFA Europa League group stage and play the 2022 Supertaça Cândido de Oliveira against the 2021–22 Primeira Liga winners. As Porto secured qualification to the 2022–23 UEFA Champions League by league ranking, the cup winner's place in the Europa League was thus transferred to the league's fourth-placed team, Braga. Consequently, the league's fifth- and sixth-placed teams, Gil Vicente and Vitória de Guimarães, qualified instead for the 2022–23 UEFA Europa Conference League third and second qualifying rounds, respectively. As Porto also won the league title, they played the 2022 Supertaça match against the cup runners-up, Tondela.

== See also ==
- 2021–22 FC Porto season
- 2021–22 C.D. Tondela season
- 2022 Taça da Liga final
