= Alioune Ndour =

Alioune Ndour may refer to:

- Alioune Ndour (footballer, born 1997), Senegalese footballer who plays for Zulte Waregem
- Alioune Ndour (footballer, born 2001), Senegalese footballer who plays for Estrela da Amadora
