= 2023–24 G.D. Chaves season =

Portuguese football team's season

G.D. Chaves
2023–24 season
- Chairman: Bruno Carvalho
- Manager: José Gomes (until 19 September); Moreno (from 21 September)
- Stadium: Estádio Municipal Eng. Manuel Branco Teixeira
- Primeira Liga: 18th
- Taça de Portugal: Third round
- Taça da Liga: First round
- Top goalscorer: League: Héctor Hernández (14); All: Héctor Hernández (14)

The 2023–24 season was G.D. Chaves's 75th season in existence and second consecutive in the Primeira Liga, the top division of association football in Portugal. They also competed in the Taça de Portugal and the Taça da Liga.

== Players ==
=== First-team squad ===
As of 9 February 2024

Note: Flags indicate national team as defined under FIFA eligibility rules; some limited exceptions apply. Players may hold more than one non-FIFA nationality.

No.	Pos.	Nation	Player
1	GK	BRA	Hugo Souza (on loan from Flamengo)
2	DF	CIV	Habib Sylla
3	DF	BRA	Ygor Nogueira
4	DF	POR	Bruno Rodrigues
6	MF	RSA	Cafú Phete
7	MF	POR	Benny
9	FW	BRA	Paulo Victor
10	FW	GBS	Leandro Sanca
13	DF	POR	Vasco Fernandes
14	MF	POR	Dário Essugo (on loan from Sporting CP)
18	MF	POR	Pedro Pinho
19	DF	CAN	Steven Vitória
20	MF	POR	Rúben Ribeiro

No.	Pos.	Nation	Player
21	MF	MOZ	Guima
23	FW	ESP	Héctor Hernández
27	DF	POR	Carraça
28	MF	NGR	Kelechi Nwakali
30	GK	POR	Gonçalo Pinto
31	GK	BRA	Rodrigo Moura
33	DF	POR	Sandro Cruz
40	DF	NGR	Junior Pius
70	MF	POR	Hélder Morim
77	DF	CPV	João Correia (captain)
80	MF	POR	Raphael Guzzo
87	FW	POR	Rodrigo Melro
99	FW	BRA	Jô

=== Out on loan ===
Note: Flags indicate national team as defined under FIFA eligibility rules; some limited exceptions apply. Players may hold more than one non-FIFA nationality.

No.	Pos.	Nation	Player
5	DF	MOZ	Bruno Langa (at Almería until 30 June 2024)
11	FW	GHA	Issah Abass (at Sepahan until 30 June 2024)
17	FW	ANG	Picas (at Feirense until 30 June 2024)

No.	Pos.	Nation	Player
24	DF	POR	Edu Borges (at Trofense until 30 June 2024)
72	DF	BRA	Guilherme Ferreira (at Feirense until 30 June 2024)
96	MF	BRA	Ktatau (at Felgueiras until 30 June 2024)

== Transfers ==
=== In ===
Pos.	Player	Transferred from	Fee	Date	Source

=== Out ===
Pos.	Player	Transferred to	Fee	Date	Source

== Pre-season and friendlies ==
Win Draw Loss Fixtures

== Competitions ==
=== Overall record ===
Competition	First match	Last match	Starting round	Final position	Record							
Competition	First match	Last match	Starting round	Final position	Pld	W	D	L	GF	GA	GD	Win %
Primeira Liga	13 August 2023	18 May 2024	Matchday 1	18th	34	5	8	21	31	72	−41	14.71
Taça de Portugal	22 October 2023		Third round	Third round	1	0	1	0	0	0	+0	0.00
Taça da Liga	22 July 2023		First round	First round	1	0	1	0	1	1	+0	0.00
Total					36	5	10	21	32	73	−41	13.89

Last updated: 17 February 2024
Source: Soccerway

=== Primeira Liga ===
==== League table ====
Pos	Team	Pld	W	D	L	GF	GA	GD	Pts	Qualification or relegation
14	Estrela da Amadora	34	7	12	15	33	53	−20	33 (Note: Head-to-head away goals scored: Estoril 1, Estrela da Amadora 0.)	
15	Boavista	34	7	11	16	39	62	−23	32 (Note: Head-to-head points: Boavista 4, Portimonense 1.)	
16	Portimonense (R)	34	8	8	18	39	72	−33	32	Qualification for the relegation play-offs
17	Vizela (R)	34	5	11	18	36	66	−30	26	Relegation to Liga Portugal 2
18	Chaves (R)	34	5	8	21	31	72	−41	23	Relegation to Liga Portugal 2

Source: Liga Portugal
Rules for classification: 1) Points; 2) Head-to-head points; 3) Head-to-head goal difference; 4) Head-to-head away goals scored; 5) Goal difference; 6) Matches won; 7) Goals scored; 8) Play-off.
(R) Relegated

==== Results summary ====
Overall								Home						Away					
Pld	W	D	L	GF	GA	GD	Pts	W	D	L	GF	GA	GD	W	D	L	GF	GA	GD
34	5	8	21	31	72	−41	23	3	4	10	21	37	−16	2	4	11	10	35	−25

Last updated: 20 May 2024.
Source: Liga Portugal

==== Results by round ====
Round	1	2	3	4	5	6	7	8	9	10	11	12	13	14	15	16	17	18	19	20	21	22
Ground	A	H	A	H	A	H	A	H	A	H	A	H	A	H	A	A	H	H	A	H	A	H
Result	L	L	L	L	L	D	W	W	L	L	L	W	L	L	L	D	L	D	D	D	L	W
Position	16	16	18	18	18	18	18	14	14	17	17	17	18	18	18	18	18	18	18	17	18	

Updated to match(es) played on 17 February 2024. Source: Liga Portugal
A = Away; H = Home; W = Win; D = Draw; L = Loss

==== Matches ====
The league fixtures were unveiled on 5 July 2023.

13 August 2023 1	Rio Ave	2–0	Chaves	Vila do Conde
15:30 UTC+1		Report		Stadium: Estadio dos Arcos; Referee: Ricardo Baixinho

19 August 2023 2	Chaves	2–4	Braga	Chaves
18:00 UTC+1		Report		Stadium: Estádio Municipal Eng. Manuel Branco Teixeira; Referee: João Gonçalves

4 February 2024 20	Chaves	1–1	Farense	Chaves
15:30	Nogueira (red card) 16'; Hernández 53' (pen.)		Bruno 35'	Stadium: Estádio Municipal Eng. Manuel Branco Teixeira; Referee: Ricardo Baixinho

10 February 2024 21	Moreirense	1–0	Chaves	Moreira de Cónegos
18:00	Madson 73'			Stadium: Parque de Jogos Comendador Joaquim de Almeida Freitas; Referee: José Bessa

17 February 2024 22	Chaves	2–1	Boavista	Chaves
15:30	Guzzo 7'; Carraça (red card) 59'; Hernández 71'		Lourenço 23' (pen.)	Stadium: Estádio Municipal Eng. Manuel Branco Teixeira

=== Taça da Liga ===
22 July 2023 First round	AVS	1–1 (5–3 p)	Chaves	Vila das Aves
20:00 UTC+1		Report		Stadium: Estádio do CD das Aves; Referee: José Bessa
