= Tiago Almeida =

Tiago Almeida may refer to:

- Tiago Almeida (footballer, born 1990), Cape Verdean footballer
- Tiago Almeida (footballer, born 2001), Portuguese footballer

== See also ==
- Thiago Almeida (disambiguation)
