= Thiago Almeida =

Thiago Almeida may refer to:

- Thiago Almeida (rower) (born 1980), Brazilian rower

== See also ==
- Tiago Almeida (disambiguation)
