= Nélson Agra =

Portuguese footballer

Personal information
- Full name: Nélson José Figueiredo Agra
- Date of birth: 6 January 1991 (age 35)
- Place of birth: Póvoa de Varzim, Portugal
- Height: 1.75 m (5 ft 9 in)
- Position: Midfielder

Youth career
- 2004–2010: Varzim

Senior career*
Years	Team	Apps	(Gls)
2010–2013	Varzim	48	(0)
2013–2014	Gil Vicente	0	(0)
2014	→ Leixões (loan)	7	(0)
2014–2021	Varzim	173	(4)
2021–2022	Salgueiros	20	(1)
2022–2023	Ribeirão	27	(2)
2023–2024	Forjães	30	(0)
2024–2025	Esposende	2	(0)

International career
2011	Portugal U20	1	(0)
- * Club domestic league appearances and goals as of 19:06, 18 May 2025 (UTC)

Nélson José Figueiredo Agra (born 6 January 1991) is a Portuguese professional footballer who plays as a midfielder.

== Club career ==
Born in Póvoa de Varzim, Agra developed in the ranks of hometown club Varzim S.C. from 2004. He made his debut on 5 December 2010 in a 3–3 Liga de Honra away draw against F.C. Arouca, starting and being substituted for his cousin Salvador Agra with ten minutes left. He played four more games, all as starter, as the season ended with relegation.

In June 2013, Agra signed a three-year deal with Gil Vicente F.C. of the Primeira Liga. His playing time was limited to the Taça da Liga, and halfway through the campaign he dropped down a league to Leixões S.C. on a five-month loan.

Agra returned to Varzim, still in the third tier, ahead of 2014–15. They won promotion as runners-up, and he remained a regular in the second division; he left his hometown team in June 2021 and criticised manager António Barbosa for playing him at right-back in his last season.

After his exit from Varzim, Agra signed for S.C. Salgueiros in division four. He scored once in his only season at the side from the north of Porto, deciding a 1–0 win over C.F. União de Coimbra on 19 September 2021.
