= Thibang Phete =

South African soccer player (born 1994)

Cafu Phete
Personal information
- Full name: Thibang Sindile Theophilus Pete
- Date of birth: 4 April 1994 (age 32)
- Place of birth: Kimberley, South Africa
- Height: 1.87 m (6 ft 1 1/2 in)
- Positions: Defensive midfielder; centre-back

Team information
- Current team: Vestri
- Number: 12

Youth career
- Milano United

Senior career*
Years	Team	Apps	(Gls)
2013–2014	Milano United		
2014–2015	Tourizense	15	(0)
2015–2016	Vitória SC	11	(0)
2015–2019	Vitória SC B	67	(4)
2019–2020	Famalicão	1	(0)
2020	→ B-SAD (loan)	14	(0)
2020–2022	B-SAD	53	(1)
2022–2023	Al Bataeh	11	(0)
2023–2024	Chaves	9	(0)
2025–	Vestri	40	(1)

International career^{‡}
2020–	South Africa	4	(0)
- * Club domestic league appearances and goals as of 13 September 2026 ‡ National team caps and goals as of 25 August 2023

Thibang Sindile Theophilus Phete (born 4 April 1994), known as Cafu Phete, is a South African professional soccer player who plays as a defensive midfielder or centre-back for Icelandic club Vestri and the South African national team.

== Club career ==
=== Early career ===
Born in Kimberley, South Africa, Phete began his career in the National First Division with Cape Town-based club Milano United, having previously graduated from the Stars of Africa Academy. In 2014, he joined Portuguese Campeonato Nacional de Seniores side Tourizense with whom he spent one season.

=== Vitória S.C. ===
On 13 August 2015, Primeira Liga side Vitória S.C. announced the signing of Phete from Tourizense. He made his debut for the club on 28 November in a 2–1 win over Boavista during which he was booked in the 29th minute before being substituted at half-time for Otávio. He made 12 appearances over the course of the season as Vitória ended in ninth spot on the Primeira Liga table. At the end of the season Phete was joined at the club by fellow countrymen Bongani Zungu and Haashim Domingo who had signed for the upcoming season. He failed to appear for the senior side in the following two seasons, however, after he was moved to the club's reserve squad, Vitória S.C. B.

=== Famalicão ===
In June 2019, Phete left Guimarães to sign for fellow Primeira Liga side Famalicão on a three-year deal.

=== B-SAD ===
In January 2020, Famalicão sent Phete on loan to Primeira Liga side B-SAD until the end of the 2019–20 season. On 1 August 2020, B-SAD announced the permanent signing of Phete on a two-year contract.

=== Al Bataeh ===
In July 2022, after his contract with B-SAD had expired, Phete signed for UAE Pro League side Al Bataeh.

=== Chaves ===
On 14 August 2023, Phete returned to Portugal, signing a one-year contract with Primeira Liga side Chaves.

=== Vestri ===
In 2025, Phete joined Vestri. On 22 August 2025, he won the Icelandic Cup with Vestri.

== International career ==
He made his international debut for South Africa on 8 October 2020 in a 1–1 draw with Namibia.

== Career statistics ==
As of match played 22 January 2023

Appearances and goals by club, season and competition
Club	Season	League			National cup (Note: Includes Taça de Portugal)		League cup (Note: Includes Taça da Liga and UAE League Cup)		Total	
Club	Season	Division	Apps	Goals	Apps	Goals	Apps	Goals	Apps	Goals
Tourizense	2014–15	Campeonato Nacional de Seniores	15	0	0	0	—		15	0
Vitória SC	2015–16	Primeira Liga	11	0	0	0	0	0	11	0
Vitória SC B	2015–16	LigaPro	12	0	—		—		12	0
Vitória SC B	2016–17	LigaPro	8	0	—		—		8	0
Vitória SC B	2017–18	LigaPro	21	1	—		—		21	1
Vitória SC B	2018–19	LigaPro	26	3	—		—		26	3
Vitória SC B	Total		67	4	—		—		67	4
Famalicão	2019–20	Primeira Liga	1	0	2	0	0	0	3	0
B-SAD (loan)	2019–20	Primeira Liga	14	0	0	0	0	0	14	0
B-SAD	2020–21	Primeira Liga	27	1	2	0	—		29	1
B-SAD	2021–22	Primeira Liga	26	0	3	0	1	0	30	0
B-SAD	Total		67	1	5	0	1	0	73	1
Al Bataeh	2022–23	UAE Pro League	11	0	0	0	1	0	12	0
Chaves	2023–24	Primeira Liga	0	0	0	0	0	0	0	0
Career Total			172	5	7	0	2	0	181	5
