= Eduardo Quaresma =

Portuguese footballer (born 2002)

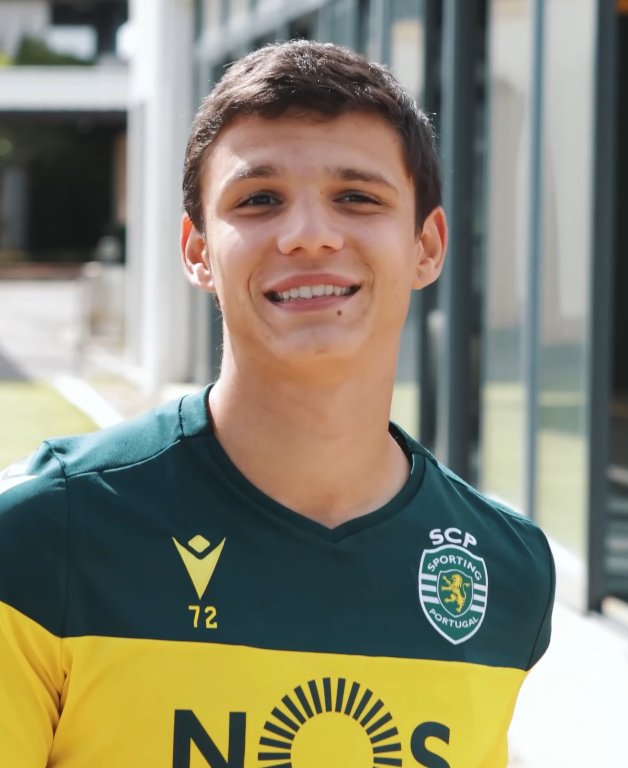
- Quaresma in 2021

Personal information
- Full name: Eduardo Filipe Quaresma Coimbra Simões
- Date of birth: 2 March 2002 (age 24)
- Place of birth: Barreiro, Portugal
- Height: 1.84 m (6 ft 0 in)
- Position: Centre-back

Team information
- Current team: Sporting CP
- Number: 72

Youth career
- 2005–2011: Fabril
- 2011–2020: Sporting CP

Senior career*
Years	Team	Apps	(Gls)
2020–	Sporting CP	74	(4)
2020–2021	Sporting CP B	6	(0)
2021–2022	→ Tondela (loan)	25	(2)
2022–2023	→ Hoffenheim B (loan)	6	(0)
2022–2023	→ Hoffenheim (loan)	4	(0)

International career
2017	Portugal U15	4	(0)
2017–2018	Portugal U16	10	(0)
2018–2019	Portugal U17	14	(0)
2019	Portugal U18	3	(0)
2019	Portugal U19	5	(0)
2021–2025	Portugal U21	12	(0)
- * Club domestic league appearances and goals as of 00:55, 8 November 2026 (UTC)

Eduardo Filipe Quaresma Coimbra Simões (born 2 March 2002) is a Portuguese professional footballer who plays as a centre-back for Primeira Liga club Sporting CP.

== Club career ==
=== Sporting CP ===
==== Early career ====
Born in Barreiro, Setúbal District, Quaresma joined the youth academy of Fabril at the age of 3 before moving to Sporting CP in 2011. In May 2020, the club rejected a bid of €5 million and Diego Laxalt from AC Milan in exchange for his signature. Inter Milan and RB Leipzig were also interested in him, but he agreed to a new contract to tie him to Sporting until 2025, with a €45 million buyout clause and annual salary of €250,000.

Quaresma made his professional debut in a 2–2 Primeira Liga away draw against Vitória de Guimarães on 4 June 2020, playing the full game. In the following season, he contributed two appearances (three overall) as his team won the national championship for the first time in 19 years.

==== 2021–2023: Loans to Tondela and Hoffenheim ====
On 23 July 2021, Quaresma was loaned to Tondela for one year without a buying option. He scored his first goal in the Portuguese top flight on 7 January 2022, a late consolation in the 1–3 home loss to Benfica. He played 30 games as they suffered relegation; one of those was on 22 May when he featured the entire final of the Taça de Portugal, lost 3–1 to Porto.

On 4 August 2022, Quaresma joined Hoffenheim on a season-long loan, with an option to make the move permanent afterwards. He totalled only four matches during his spell in Germany, and the club did not activate the clause.

==== Return from loan ====
Quaresma returned to the Estádio José Alvalade in summer 2023. Having begun the campaign on the bench, he benefitted from injuries to teammates and the absence of Ousmane Diomande, who was competing in the 2023 Africa Cup of Nations, and was given a start against rivals Porto on 18 December; he impressed in the game, and also created a play that led to a goal by Viktor Gyökeres that was disallowed, in a 2–0 win to overtake Benfica at the top of the table. Afterwards, he began appearing regularly as a starter, and scored his first competitive goal for Sporting on 11 February 2024 in a 5–0 home victory over Braga.

Quaresma made his continental debut on 15 February 2024, featuring the entire 3–1 away defeat of Young Boys in the knockout phase of the UEFA Europa League. He made his first appearance in the UEFA Champions League on 1 October, in a 1–1 away draw against PSV Eindhoven in the league stage. On 4 May 2025, he scored a stoppage-time goal in a 2–1 win over Gil Vicente to help his team maintain their lead at the top of the table with two matches remaining.

== International career ==
Quaresma represented Portugal at under-15, under-16, under-17, under-18 and under-19 levels, totalling 36 caps. He made his debut for the under-21s on 6 September 2021, in a 1–0 win over Belarus in the 2023 UEFA European Championship qualifiers held in Amadora.

== Style of play ==
Quaresma was primarily deployed as a central defender, although he was also used as a right-back or defensive midfielder. He was noted for his passing range, anticipation and defensive positioning, as well as his ability to carry the ball and play short passes. His pace and mobility allowed him to contribute in both defensive and build-up phases of play.

== Personal life ==
Quaresma is a distant relative of Brazilian international Zico. He is also a distant cousin of fellow footballer Ricardo Quaresma through his mother.

== Career statistics ==
As of match played 24 May 2026

Appearances and goals by club, season and competition
Club	Season	League			National cup		League cup		Continental		Other		Total	
Club	Season	Division	Apps	Goals	Apps	Goals	Apps	Goals	Apps	Goals	Apps	Goals	Apps	Goals
Sporting CP	2019–20	Primeira Liga	9	0	0	0	0	0	0	0	—		9	0
Sporting CP	2020–21	Primeira Liga	2	0	0	0	1	0	0	0	—		3	0
Sporting CP	2023–24	Primeira Liga	20	1	4	0	2	0	4 (Note: Appearances in UEFA Europa League)	0	—		30	1
Sporting CP	2024–25	Primeira Liga	20	1	3	0	2	0	5 (Note: Appearances in UEFA Champions League)	0	1 (Note: Appearance in Supertaça Cândido de Oliveira)	0	31	1
Sporting CP	2025–26	Primeira Liga	16	2	6	0	2	0	7	0	0	0	31	2
Sporting CP	Total		67	4	13	0	7	0	16	0	1	0	104	4
Sporting CP B	2020–21	Campeonato de Portugal	6	0	—		—		—		—		6	0
Tondela (loan)	2021–22	Primeira Liga	25	2	5	0	0	0	—		—		30	2
Hoffenheim B (loan)	2022–23	Regionalliga	6	0	—		—		—		—		6	0
Hoffenheim (loan)	2022–23	Bundesliga	4	0	0	0	—		—		—		4	0
Career total			108	6	18	0	7	0	16	0	1	0	150	6

== Honours ==
Sporting CP

- Primeira Liga: 2020–21, 2023–24, 2024–25
- Taça de Portugal: 2024–25
- Taça da Liga: 2020–21
