= Héctor Hernández (footballer, born 1995) =

Spanish footballer

Personal information
- Full name: Héctor José Hernández Marrero
- Date of birth: 14 September 1995 (age 31)
- Place of birth: Las Palmas, Spain
- Height: 1.80 m (5 ft 11 in)
- Position: Forward

Team information
- Current team: Gil Vicente
- Number: 23

Youth career
- Las Palmas

Senior career*
Years	Team	Apps	(Gls)
2012–2013	Las Palmas B	1	(0)
2013–2015	Atlético Madrid B	37	(6)
2015–2020	Atlético Madrid	1	(0)
2015–2016	→ Elche (loan)	31	(1)
2016–2018	→ Albacete (loan)	49	(22)
2018–2019	→ Málaga (loan)	7	(0)
2019	→ Rayo Majadahonda (loan)	18	(4)
2019–2020	→ Fuenlabrada (loan)	6	(0)
2020–2021	Cultural Leonesa	23	(4)
2021–2022	Rayo Majadahonda	30	(16)
2022–2024	Chaves	54	(21)
2024–2026	Corinthians	18	(1)
2026–	Gil Vicente	12	(4)

International career
2013	Spain U19	5	(1)
- * Club domestic league appearances and goals as of 16:04, 31 August 2026 (UTC)

Héctor José Hernández Marrero (born 14 September 1995) is a Spanish professional footballer who plays as a forward for Primeira Liga club Gil Vicente.

== Club career ==
Born in Las Palmas, Canary Islands, Hernández started playing football with hometown club UD Las Palmas and made his senior debut with their reserves in the 2012–13 season, in the Tercera División. On 15 May 2013, he signed with Atlético Madrid for a €250,000 fee plus 750,000 in add-ons, being assigned to the B team in the Segunda División B.

Hernández made his debut with the Colchoneros' main squad on 18 December 2013, coming on as a 76th-minute substitute for Léo Baptistão and scoring immediately after in a 2–1 Copa del Rey home win against UE Sant Andreu (6–1 on aggregate). He first appeared in La Liga on 25 August 2014, replacing Mario Mandžukić in the 0–0 draw at Rayo Vallecano.

On 13 August 2015, Hernández joined Elche CF from Segunda División in a season-long loan. One year later, he moved to Albacete Balompié also in a temporary deal; after achieving promotion to the second tier while contributing a career-best 20 goals to the feat, his loan was extended for a further year on 1 September 2017.

On 1 August 2018, Hernández agreed to a one-year loan deal at Málaga CF, still in division two. The following 31 January, he joined CF Rayo Majadahonda of the same league on loan until June.

On 28 July 2019, Hernández moved to another second-division newcomer, CF Fuenlabrada, on loan for one year. In February 2021, after terminating his contract with Atlético Madrid, he signed with third-tier Cultural y Deportiva Leonesa until 30 June. In the summer, he joined Rayo Majadahonda in the newly created Primera División RFEF.

Hernández had his first abroad experience in the 2022–23 campaign, with G.D. Chaves who had just returned to the Portuguese Primeira Liga. He scored seven goals in his first year, leading the squad alongside Steven Vitória in a seventh-place finish. He doubled those figures in 2023–24, but his side was relegated after ranking last.

On 27 August 2024, Hernández signed a two-year contract with Sport Club Corinthians Paulista of the Campeonato Brasileiro Série A. In January 2026, having scored twice in 24 appearances, he left by mutual agreement.

Hours after leaving Corinthians, Hernández returned to the Portuguese top tier on a one-and-a-half-year deal at Gil Vicente FC. He scored on his debut on 7 February 2026, helping to a 2–1 away victory over Moreirense FC.

== Career statistics ==
As of match played 12 June 2025

Appearances and goals by club, season and competition
Club	Season	League			National cup		League cup		Other		Total	
Club	Season	Division	Apps	Goals	Apps	Goals	Apps	Goals	Apps	Goals	Apps	Goals
Atlético Madrid B	2013–14	Segunda División B	16	5	—		—		0	0	16	5
Atlético Madrid B	2014–15	Segunda División B	21	1	—		—		—		21	1
Atlético Madrid B	Total		37	6	—		—		0	0	37	6
Atlético Madrid	2013–14	La Liga	0	0	1	1	—		0	0	1	1
Atlético Madrid	2014–15	La Liga	1	0	0	0	—		0	0	1	0
Atlético Madrid	Total		1	0	1	1	—		0	0	2	1
Elche (loan)	2015–16	Segunda División	31	1	0	0	—		—		31	1
Albacete (loan)	2016–17	Segunda División B	33	20	2	0	—		5 (Note: Appearances in 2017 Segunda División B play-offs)	0	40	20
Albacete (loan)	2017–18	Segunda División	16	2	1	0	—		—		17	2
Albacete (loan)	Total		49	22	3	0	—		5	0	57	22
Málaga (loan)	2018–19	Segunda División	7	0	1	1	—		—		8	1
Rayo Majadahonda (loan)	2018–19	Segunda División	18	4	0	0	—		—		18	4
Fuenlabrada (loan)	2019–20	Segunda División	6	0	2	1	—		—		8	1
Cultural Leonesa	2019–20	Segunda División B	5	2	0	0	—		2 (Note: Appearances in 2020 Segunda División B play-offs)	2	7	4
Cultural Leonesa	2020–21	Segunda División B	18	2	1	0	—		—		19	2
Cultural Leonesa	Total		23	4	1	0	—		2	2	26	6
Rayo Majadahonda	2021–22	Primera División RFEF	30	16	2	0	—		1 (Note: Appearance in 2022 Primera División RFEF play-offs)	0	33	16
Chaves	2022–23	Primeira Liga	22	7	1	0	1	0	—		24	7
Chaves	2023–24	Primeira Liga	32	14	1	0	1	0	—		34	14
Chaves	Total		54	21	2	0	2	0	—		58	21
Corinthians	2024	Série A	3	0	2	0	0	0	0	0	5	0
Corinthians	2025	Série A	9	1	1	1	0	0	9 (Note: Appearances in Campeonato Paulista and Copa Libertadores)	0	19	2
Corinthians	Total		12	1	3	1	0	0	9	0	24	2
Career totals			268	75	15	4	2	0	16	2	302	81

== Honours ==
Corinthians

- Copa do Brasil: 2025
- Campeonato Paulista: 2025
