= Salvador Agra =

Portuguese footballer (born 1991)

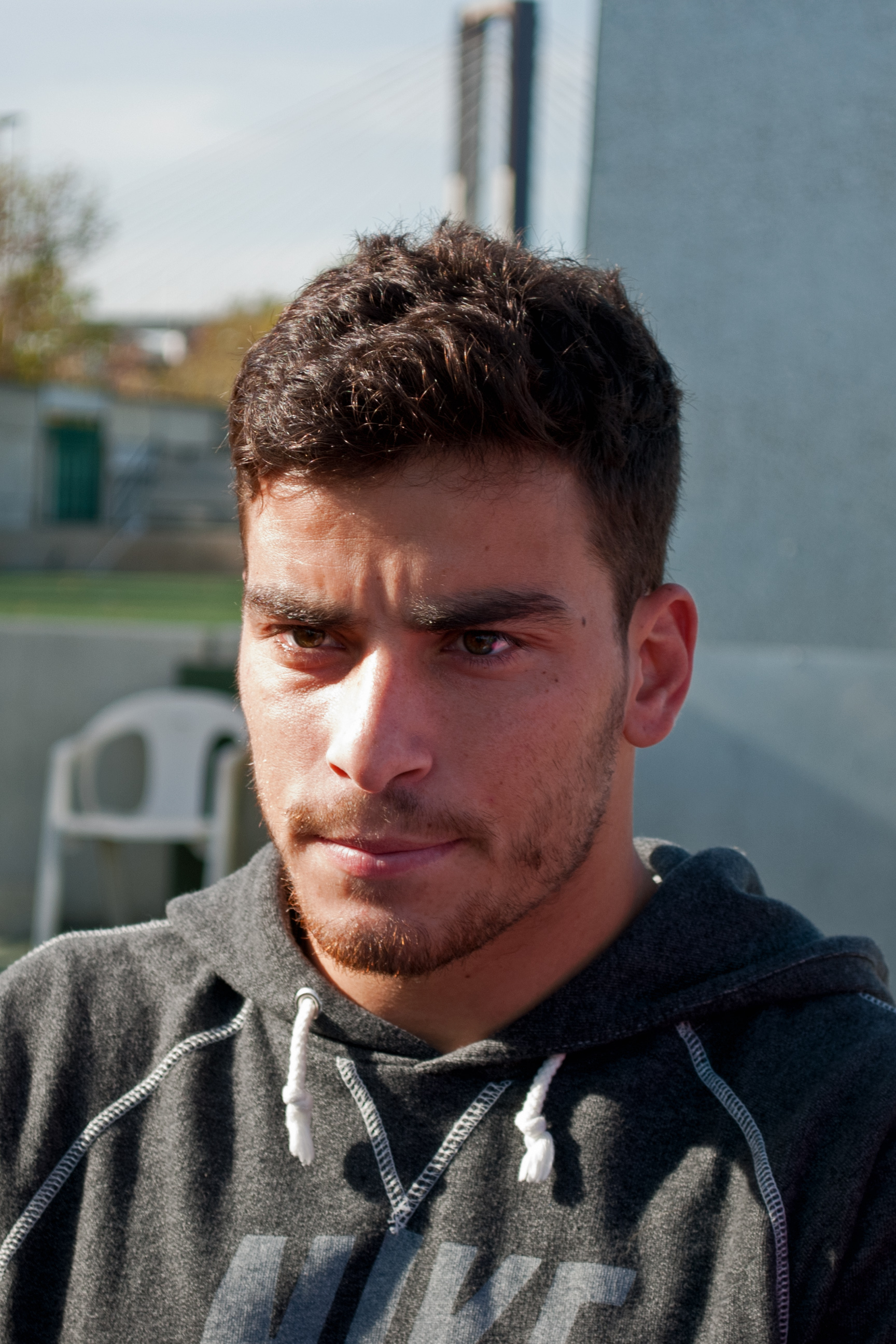
- Agra in 2013

Personal information
- Full name: Salvador José Milhazes Agra
- Date of birth: 11 November 1991 (age 35)
- Place of birth: Vila do Conde, Portugal
- Height: 1.66 m (5 ft 5 in)
- Position: Winger

Team information
- Current team: Leixões
- Number: 11

Youth career
- 2000–2010: Varzim

Senior career*
Years	Team	Apps	(Gls)
2010–2011	Varzim	29	(1)
2011–2012	Olhanense	27	(4)
2012–2015	Betis	10	(1)
2013	→ Siena (loan)	9	(0)
2013–2014	→ Braga (loan)	8	(0)
2014	→ Académica (loan)	14	(4)
2014–2015	→ Braga (loan)	26	(4)
2014	→ Braga B (loan)	1	(0)
2015–2017	Nacional	65	(12)
2017–2019	Benfica	0	(0)
2017–2018	→ Aves (loan)	17	(3)
2018	→ Granada (loan)	14	(0)
2018	→ Cádiz (loan)	6	(0)
2019–2020	Legia Warsaw	6	(0)
2019–2020	Legia Warsaw II	2	(0)
2020–2022	Tondela	63	(9)
2022–2025	Boavista	93	(7)
2025–	Leixões	31	(5)

International career
2010	Portugal U19	5	(2)
2010	Portugal U20	2	(0)
2011–2012	Portugal U21	8	(2)
2016	Portugal Olympic (O.P.)	4	(0)
- * Club domestic league appearances and goals as of 11:59, 18 May 2026 (UTC)

Salvador José Milhazes Agra (born 11 November 1991) is a Portuguese professional footballer who plays as a winger for Liga Portugal 2 club Leixões.

In a journeyman career, he made 313 Primeira Liga appearances for Olhanense, Braga, Académica, Nacional, Aves, Tondela and Boavista, while also being on the books of Benfica. Abroad, he had brief spells in Italy, Spain and Poland.

== Club career ==
=== Early years and Olhanense ===
Born in Vila do Conde, Agra began his career with Varzim SC, joining the club's youth ranks at the age of 13. He made his senior debut in 2010–11, being a very important attacking unit – only one league game missed – as the Póvoa de Varzim team was finally relegated from the Segunda Liga. He scored his one goal on 21 May 2011 in the penultimate round of the season, opening a 1–2 home loss against C.F. Os Belenenses.

Agra signed for S.C. Olhanense in the summer of 2011, penning a three-year contract with the Algarve side on 8 July. He made his Primeira Liga debut on 13 August, playing 15 minutes in a 1–1 draw at Sporting CP. His first goal was on 11 September as a substitute in a 1–2 home defeat to C.D. Feirense.

=== Betis ===
In late January 2012, Agra joined Spanish club Real Betis who paid €300,000 for 60% of his rights, but stayed with Olhanense until the end of the campaign. He appeared in just 14 competitive matches during his spell in Andalusia – scoring his only goal in a 2–4 La Liga home loss against Atlético Madrid– being successively loaned to A.C. Siena, S.C. Braga and Académica de Coimbra.

While on loan to Braga, Agra was sent off for the only time in his career in a goalless draw to rivals Vitória S.C. on 7 December 2014 for an altercation with Hernâni Fortes, who was also dismissed. He made four appearances from the bench in their run to the final of the Taça de Portugal; in that match, on 31 May, he missed the decisive penalty in the shootout as they lost to Sporting.

=== Journeyman ===
On 28 June 2015, Agra cut ties with Betis and signed a four-year contract with C.D. Nacional. On 1 July 2017, after the latter's relegation, he agreed to a three-year deal with Portuguese champions S.L. Benfica; he spent his first year on loan, to C.D. Aves and Granada CF (the latter in the Spanish Segunda División).

For 2018–19, Agra joined Cádiz CF from Spain on a one-year loan. In the following transfer window, however, he terminated his link with Benfica and moved to Legia Warsaw in the Polish Ekstraklasa on a two-and-a-half-year contract. He quit the club a year early on 7 May 2020, having made only nine goalless appearances, weeks before they secured the league title.

=== Tondela ===
Agra returned to Portugal on 14 August 2020, signing a two-year contract with C.D. Tondela. He missed only five league games in his spell at the Estádio João Cardoso and scored nine times, including two on 16 January 2021 in a 3–1 home win over Boavista FC.

On 22 May 2022, days after the team's relegation, Agra captained the side in the 3–1 loss to FC Porto in the domestic cup final; he had featured six times up to the decisive match, and scored an added-time winner in a 2–1 victory against amateurs A.D. Camacha in the third round.

=== Later career ===
On 11 June 2022, Agra agreed to a two-year deal at Boavista. He made 102 appearances during his three-year tenure, scoring seven goals and providing ten assists; at the end of the 2024–25 campaign, they were relegated from the top division to the Porto regional leagues due to severe financial problems.

On 14 July 2025, Agra joined second-tier club Leixões S.C. on a one-year contract.

== International career ==
Agra earned 15 caps for Portugal at youth level, including eight for the under-21 team. His first arrived on 5 September 2011, when he played the last 12 minutes of a 1–0 friendly win over France.

Agra was also one of three over-23 players for the Olympic team in 2016.

== Personal life ==
Agra's cousin, Nélson, was a teammate at Varzim. Also born in 1991, he spent most of his professional career at the club.

== Career statistics ==
As of match played 17 May 2025

Appearances and goals by club, season and competition
Club	Season	League			National cup (Note: Includes Taça de Portugal, Copa del Rey, Polish Cup)		League cup (Note: Includes Taça da Liga)		Continental		Total	
Club	Season	Division	Apps	Goals	Apps	Goals	Apps	Goals	Apps	Goals	Apps	Goals
Varzim	2010–11	Liga de Honra	29	1	4	1	3	0	—		36	2
Olhanense	2011–12	Primeira Liga	27	4	3	0	1	0	—		31	4
Betis	2012–13	La Liga	10	1	4	0	—		—		14	1
Siena (loan)	2012–13	Serie A	9	0	0	0	—		—		9	0
Braga (loan)	2013–14	Primeira Liga	8	0	2	0	1	0	2 (Note: Appearances in UEFA Europa League)	0	13	0
Académica (loan)	2013–14	Primeira Liga	14	4	1	0	0	0	—		15	4
Braga (loan)	2014–15	Primeira Liga	26	4	5	0	3	0	—		34	4
Braga B (loan)	2014–15	Segunda Liga	1	0	—		—		—		1	0
Nacional	2015–16	Primeira Liga	34	9	4	3	3	1	—		41	13
Nacional	2016–17	Primeira Liga	31	3	2	1	0	0	—		33	4
Nacional	Total		65	12	6	4	3	1	—		74	17
Benfica	2017–18	Primeira Liga	0	0	0	0	0	0	0	0	0	0
Aves (loan)	2017–18	Primeira Liga	17	3	4	0	1	0	—		22	3
Granada (loan)	2017–18	Segunda División	14	0	0	0	—		—		14	0
Cádiz (loan)	2018–19	Segunda División	6	0	4	0	—		—		10	0
Legia Warsaw	2018–19	Ekstraklasa	4	0	1	0	—		0	0	5	0
Legia Warsaw	2019–20	Ekstraklasa	2	0	0	0	—		2	0	4	0
Legia Warsaw	Total		6	0	1	0	—		2	0	9	0
Legia Warsaw II	2019–20	III liga	2	0	—		—		—		2	0
Tondela	2020–21	Primeira Liga	31	3	0	0	—		—		31	3
Tondela	2021–22	Primeira Liga	32	6	7	1	1	0	—		40	7
Tondela	Total		63	9	7	1	1	0	—		71	10
Boavista	2022–23	Primeira Liga	30	3	1	0	4	0	—		35	3
Boavista	2023–24	Primeira Liga	31	3	2	0	1	0	—		34	3
Boavista	2024–25	Primeira Liga	32	1	1	0	—		—		33	1
Boavista	Total		93	7	4	0	5	0	—		102	7
Career total			390	45	45	6	18	1	4	0	457	52

== Honours ==
Aves

- Taça de Portugal: 2017–18

Legia Warsaw

- Ekstraklasa: 2019–20
