= Jhon Murillo =

Venezuelan footballer (born 1995)

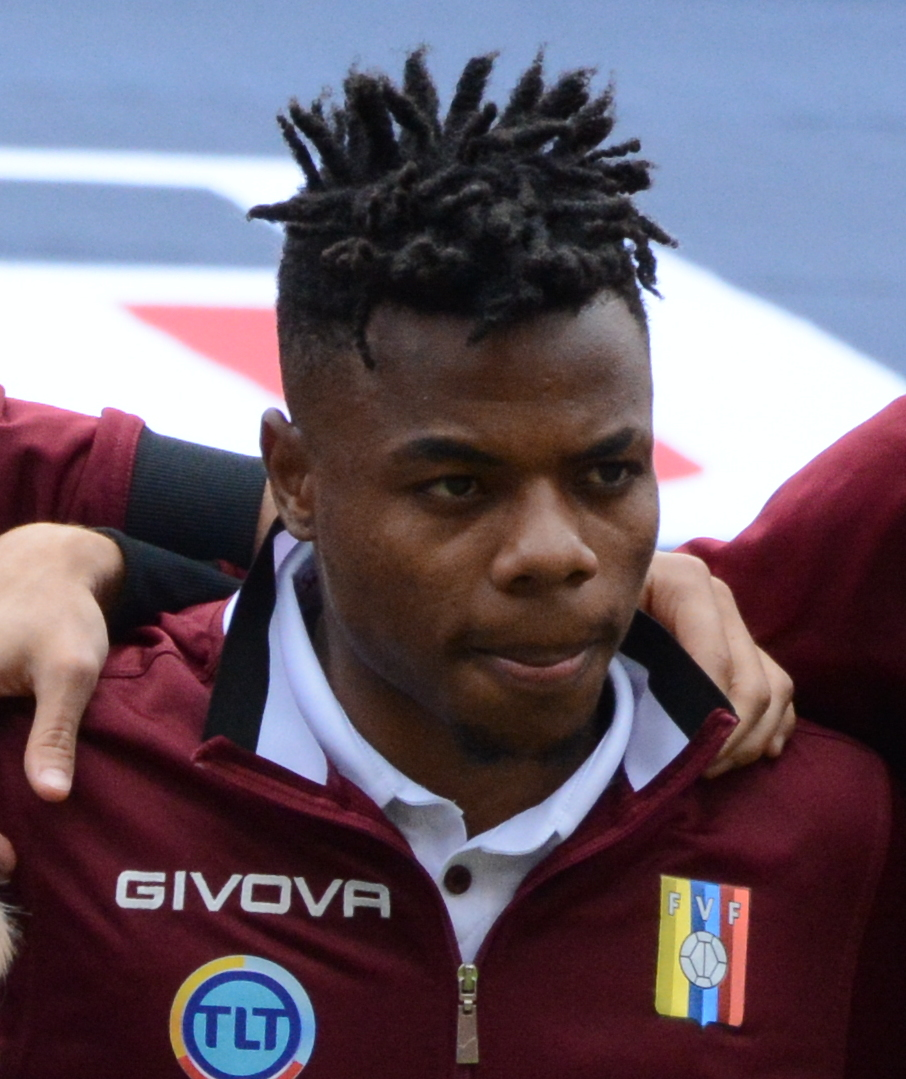
- Murillo with Venezuela in 2019

Personal information
- Full name: Jhon Eduard Murillo Romaña
- Date of birth: 21 November 1995 (age 30)
- Place of birth: El Nula, Venezuela
- Height: 1.70 m (5 ft 7 in)
- Position: Winger

Team information
- Current team: América de Cali
- Number: 11

Youth career
- San Camilo
- Alto Apure

Senior career*
Years	Team	Apps	(Gls)
2012–2015	Zamora	59	(19)
2015–2018	Benfica	0	(0)
2015–2017	→ Tondela (loan)	54	(8)
2017–2018	→ Kasımpaşa (loan)	24	(4)
2018–2021	Tondela	103	(11)
2022–2025	Atlético San Luis	86	(7)
2024	→ Atlas (loan)	33	(3)
2025–	América de Cali	11	(0)

International career^{‡}
2014	Venezuela U21	5	(2)
2015	Venezuela U20	4	(0)
2015–	Venezuela	46	(4)
- * Club domestic league appearances and goals as of 11 December 2025 ‡ National team caps and goals as of 9 September 2025

Jhon Eduard Murillo Romaña (born 21 November 1995) is a Venezuelan professional footballer who plays as a winger for América de Cali. He represents the Venezuela national team.

== Club career ==
Murillo was born in El Nula, Venezuela. After starting his career at Fundación Atlético San Camilo FC, he moved to Unión Atlético Alto Apure. In 2012, he played in the Venezuelan Tercera División.

Murillo made his Venezuelan Primera División debut on 22 October 2012 against Llaneros de Guanare. He scored his first league goal on 19 August 2013 against Deportivo Petare.

On 20 May 2015, Zamora FC confirmed Murillo's transfer to Portuguese champions Benfica on a five-year deal.

On 16 July 2015, he joined C.D. Tondela of Primeira Liga on a one-year loan. On 30 June 2016, Primeira Liga side C.D. Nacional announced that Murillo had signed a season-long loan deal with the club, however, on 25 July, he continued on loan at Tondela for a further season. Afterwards, he was loaned out to Kasımpaşa in Turkey for one season.

In January 2024, Murillo joined Atlas on loan from Atlético San Luis.

== International career ==
In 2014, Murillo helped the under-21s finish second in that year's Central American and Caribbean Games held in Mexico, scoring two goals – including the one in the semi-final against Honduras.

Murillo represented the Venezuela under-20 team in the 2015 South American Youth Football Championship in a first stage exit.

On 11 February 2015, Murillo made his debut for Venezuela in an international friendly against Honduras; he scored the winning goal in a 2–1 victory. In 2016, he was named on the 40-man preliminary list for the Copa América Centenario but he was eventually excluded from the final squad.

== Career statistics ==
=== Club ===
As of match played 30 August 2025

Appearances and goals by club, season and competition
Club	Season	League			National cup		League cup		Continental		Total	
Club	Season	Division	Apps	Goals	Apps	Goals	Apps	Goals	Apps	Goals	Apps	Goals
Zamora	2012–13	Primera División	5	0	0	0	—		—		5	0
Zamora	2013–14	Primera División	32	11	—		—		4 (Note: Appearances in Copa Libertadores)	1	36	12
Zamora	2014–15	Primera División	22	8	0	0	—		4	2	26	10
Zamora	Total		59	19	0	0	—		8	3	67	22
Benfica	2015–16	Primeira Liga	0	0	0	0	0	0	0	0	0	0
Tondela (loan)	2015–16	Primeira Liga	23	3	0	0	0	0	—		23	3
Tondela (loan)	2016–17	Primeira Liga	31	5	2	1	0	0	—		33	6
Tondela (loan)	Total		54	8	2	1	0	0	—		56	9
Kasımpaşa (loan)	2017–18	Süper Lig	24	4	1	0	—		—		25	4
Tondela	2018–19	Primeira Liga	32	3	3	0	3	1	—		38	4
Tondela	2019–20	Primeira Liga	30	2	0	0	1	0	—		31	2
Tondela	2020–21	Primeira Liga	26	4	2	0	—		—		28	4
Tondela	2021–22	Primeira Liga	15	2	3	1	1	0	—		19	3
Tondela	Total		103	11	8	1	5	1	—		116	13
Atlético San Luis	2021–22	Liga MX	19	4	—		—		—		19	4
Atlético San Luis	2022–23	Liga MX	36	2	—		—		1 (Note: Appearance in Leagues Cup)	1	37	3
Atlético San Luis	2023–24	Liga MX	21	1	—		—		—		21	1
Atlético San Luis	2024–25	Liga MX	10	0	—		—		—		10	0
Atlético San Luis	Total		86	7	—		—		1	1	87	8
Atlas (loan)	2023–24	Liga MX	14	1	—		—		—		14	1
Atlas (loan)	2024–25	Liga MX	19	2	0	0	—		3	0	22	2
Atlas (loan)	Total		33	3	0	0	—		3	0	36	3
América de Cali	2025	Categoría Primera A	5	0	1	0	2 (Note: Appearances in Copa Sudamericana)	1	—		8	1
Career total			364	52	12	2	5	1	14	5	395	60

=== International ===
As of match played 9 September 2025

National team	Year	Apps	Goals
Venezuela	2015	3	1
Venezuela	2016	2	0
Venezuela	2017	9	1
Venezuela	2018	3	0
Venezuela	2019	12	2
Venezuela	2020	2	0
Venezuela	2021	1	0
Venezuela	2022	9	0
Venezuela	2023	1	0
Venezuela	2024	4	0
Venezuela	2025	2	0
Total		46	4

Scores and results list Venezuela's goal tally first.

#	Date	Venue	Opponent	Score	Result	Competition
1.	11 February 2015	Agustín Tovar, Barinas, Venezuela	Honduras	2–1	2–1	Friendly
2.	5 September 2017	Estadio Monumental Antonio Vespucio Liberti, Buenos Aires, Argentina	Argentina	1–0	1–1	2018 FIFA World Cup qualification
3.	22 March 2019	Wanda Metropolitano, Madrid, Spain	Argentina	2–0	3–1	Friendly
4.	5 June 2019	Mercedes-Benz Stadium, Atlanta, United States	Mexico	1–0	1–3	Friendly

== Honours ==
=== Club ===
Zamora

- Primera División: 2012–13, 2013–14

=== International ===
Venezuela

- Central American and Caribbean Games Silver Medal: 2014
- Kirin Cup: 2019
