= Steven Vitória =

Canadian soccer player (born 1987)

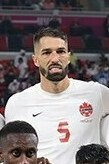
- Vitória with Canada at the 2022 FIFA World Cup

Personal information
- Full name: Steven de Sousa Vitória
- Date of birth: 11 January 1987 (age 39)
- Place of birth: Toronto, Ontario, Canada
- Height: 1.95 m (6 ft 5 in)
- Position: Centre-back

Team information
- Current team: Indonesia (assistant)

Youth career
- Sudbury Lions
- CS Azzurri
- Mississauga Falcons
- Dixie SC
- Kleinburg-Nobleton SC
- Glen Shields SC
- 2004–2005: Woodbridge Strikers
- 2005–2006: Porto

Senior career*
Years	Team	Apps	(Gls)
2006–2010	Porto	0	(0)
2006–2007	→ Tourizense (loan)	11	(2)
2007–2009	→ Olhanense (loan)	35	(1)
2009–2010	→ Covilhã (loan)	24	(1)
2010–2013	Estoril	79	(19)
2013–2014	Benfica B	7	(3)
2013–2016	Benfica	1	(0)
2015	→ Philadelphia Union (loan)	18	(1)
2016–2019	Lechia Gdańsk	37	(2)
2019–2022	Moreirense	56	(10)
2022–2024	Chaves	51	(8)
2025	Boavista	8	(0)
Total		327	(47)

International career
2006	Portugal U19	5	(0)
2006–2007	Portugal U20	6	(0)
2016–2023	Canada	46	(5)

Managerial career
- 2026–: Indonesia (assistant)
Medal record
Representing Canada
Men's soccer
CONCACAF Nations League
Runner-up	2023
- * Club domestic league appearances and goals

Steven de Sousa Vitória (born 11 January 1987) is a Canadian former professional soccer player who played as a centre-back. He is currently assistant manager of the Indonesia national team.

Having started out at Porto, he went on to represent several clubs in Portugal in both the Primeira Liga and the Segunda Liga, this including a one-year spell at Benfica. He also played in the United States and Poland.

Vitória was a Canadian international, making his debut in 2016 at the age of 29, after previously representing Portugal at youth international level. He was part of the squads at the CONCACAF Gold Cup in 2017, 2021 and 2023, reaching the semi-finals in 2021, as well as at the 2022 FIFA World Cup.

== Early life ==
Born in Toronto, Ontario, Canada, to Portuguese immigrants from the Azores, Vitória played youth soccer with the Sudbury Lions, CS Azzurri, Mississauga Falcons, Dixie SC, Kleinburg-Nobleton SC, and Glen Shields SC. He joined the Woodbridge Strikers at the age of 17, being deployed mainly as a striker. He was approached to appear for Canada's youth national teams on multiple occasions after leaving the country, but declined each time.

== Club career ==
=== Porto ===
Vitória was signed by FC Porto at the age of 18, already reconverted as a central defender. In the following years he began a series of loans, starting out at G.D. Tourizense in the third division then joining S.C. Olhanense for two years, and helping the Algarve side promote to the Primeira Liga in his second season by appearing in 18 games, 15 as a starter.

In the 2009–10 campaign, Vitória continued on loan, this time with S.C. Covilhã in the Segunda Liga. He played his first official match for his new club on 2 August 2009, in a 1–0 away win against A.D. Carregado in the Taça da Liga.

=== Estoril ===
Vitória cut all ties with Porto in July 2010, signing with G.D. Estoril Praia in the second division. In his debut season in the top flight, 2012–13, he played 27 games and scored 11 goals to finish ninth in the top scorers' chart– eight of them from penalties – to help his team finish fifth and qualify for the UEFA Europa League.

=== Benfica ===
Free agent Vitória joined S.L. Benfica on 16 June 2013, signing a four-year contract; he called the day of his signing "the most important and happiest day of my life". His only league appearance took place in the last day of the season as the club had already been crowned champions, and he played the full 90 minutes in a 2–1 loss at former side Porto.

Vitória was an unused substitute in Benfica's loss in the Europa League final to Sevilla FC on penalties. After becoming unsatisfied with his status, he was targeted by Real Betis and C.S. Marítimo.

On 9 February 2015, Vitória was loaned to Major League Soccer side Philadelphia Union for one season. He scored his first goal for the team in his hometown, in a 3–1 away defeat to Toronto FC, being released in December after the club declined against exercising its contract option on the player.

=== Lechia Gdańsk ===
Vitória joined Lechia Gdańsk on 17 August 2016, signing a three-year contract. He made his debut on 21 September, playing the entire round-of-16 penalty shootout loss to Puszcza Niepołomice in the Polish Cup (1–1 after 120 minutes).

=== Moreirense ===
Vitória returned to Portugal to sign with Moreirense F.C. on 4 July 2019, agreeing to a three-year deal. He made his debut on 11 August, playing the entire 3–1 defeat at S.C. Braga. He scored his first goal on 2 November, in a 1–1 home draw against Vitória de Guimarães.

=== Chaves ===
On 4 July 2022, after being relegated, the 35-year-old Vitória joined newly promoted G.D. Chaves for an undisclosed fee. He scored his first goal on 27 August, a powerful long-range header to open the 2–0 victory at Sporting CP. Totalling seven goals, he led the squad alongside Héctor Hernández in a seventh-place finish.

=== Boavista ===
On 12 February 2025, Vitória signed with Boavista F.C. on a four-month contract. One year later, he announced his retirement.

== International career ==
=== Portugal ===
Vitória represented Portugal at the 2006 Lusophony Games in Macau, the 2006 UEFA European Under-19 Championship in Poland and the 2007 FIFA U-20 World Cup in his birth nation. In the latter tournament, he featured in the 2–1 group stage loss to Gambia.

=== Canada ===
In September 2012, without having been capped at senior level, 25-year-old Vitória considered switching allegiance to Canada. In January 2016, he accepted a call-up by the country for a friendly against the United States on 5 February, and played the full 90 minutes in the 1–0 defeat at the Home Depot Center. He scored his first goal on 6 October, helping to a 4–0 friendly win over Mauritania.

Vitória was named to the Canadian squads for the CONCACAF Gold Cup in 2017 and 2021. In the latter tournament, he captained the side to the semi-final, where he was suspended for the 2–1 defeat to Mexico in Houston.

In November 2022, Vitória was included in the squad for the 2022 FIFA World Cup. He made his debut in the competition on the 23rd at the age of 35, in a 1–0 loss against Belgium.

In June 2023, Vitória was selected for the 2023 CONCACAF Nations League Finals. Later that month, he made the final 23-man squad due to appear at the 2023 Gold Cup. In the quarter-finals against the United States in Cincinnati, he equalized in added time in a 1–1 draw, but his attempt in the shootout was saved by Matt Turner in a Canadian defeat.

== Coaching career ==
In March 2026, Vitória was appointed assistant coach of the Indonesia national team under John Herdman.

== Style of play ==
Vitória was known for his heading, marking and scoring abilities, especially on penalty kicks and free kicks.

== Career statistics ==
=== Club ===
Appearances and goals by club, season and competition
Club	Season	League			National cup (Note: Includes Taça de Portugal, Polish Cup)		League cup (Note: Includes Taça da Liga)		Other		Total	
Club	Season	Division	Apps	Goals	Apps	Goals	Apps	Goals	Apps	Goals	Apps	Goals
Porto	2006–07	Primeira Liga	0	0	0	0	0	0	0	0	0	0
Tourizense (loan)	2006–07	Segunda Divisão	11	2	0	0	0	0	—		11	2
Olhanense (loan)	2007–08	Liga de Honra	17	0	1	0	2	0	—		20	0
Olhanense (loan)	2008–09	Liga de Honra	18	1	6	0	1	0	—		25	1
Olhanense (loan)	Total		35	1	7	0	3	0	0	0	45	1
Covilhã (loan)	2009–10	Liga de Honra	24	1	0	0	4	0	—		28	1
Estoril	2010–11	Liga de Honra	25	1	0	0	5	0	—		30	1
Estoril	2011–12	Liga de Honra	27	7	2	1	7	2	—		36	10
Estoril	2012–13	Primeira Liga	27	11	0	0	3	2	—		30	13
Estoril	Total		79	19	2	1	15	4	0	0	96	24
Benfica B	2013–14	Segunda Liga	7	3	—		—		—		7	3
Benfica	2013–14	Primeira Liga	1	0	1	0	3	0	0	0	5	0
Benfica	2014–15	Primeira Liga	0	0	0	0	0	0	0	0	0	0
Benfica	2015–16	Primeira Liga	0	0	0	0	0	0	0	0	0	0
Benfica	Total		1	0	1	0	3	0	0	0	5	0
Philadelphia Union (loan)	2015	Major League Soccer	18	1	0	0	—		—		18	1
Lechia Gdańsk	2016–17	Ekstraklasa	8	0	1	0	—		—		9	0
Lechia Gdańsk	2017–18	Ekstraklasa	14	1	1	0	—		—		15	1
Lechia Gdańsk	2018–19	Ekstraklasa	15	1	5	1	—		—		20	2
Lechia Gdańsk	Total		37	2	7	1	0	0	0	0	44	3
Moreirense	2019–20	Primeira Liga	19	5	1	0	1	0	—		21	5
Moreirense	2020–21	Primeira Liga	19	3	3	1	0	0	—		22	4
Moreirense	2021–22	Primeira Liga	18	2	1	1	0	0	1 (Note: Appearance in Primeira Liga relegation play-offs)	0	20	3
Moreirense	Total		56	10	5	2	1	0	1	0	63	12
Chaves	2022–23	Primeira Liga	31	7	1	1	1	0	—		33	8
Chaves	2023–24	Primeira Liga	20	1	1	0	0	0	—		21	1
Chaves	Total		51	8	2	1	1	0	0	0	54	9
Boavista	2024–25	Primeira Liga	8	0	0	0	0	0	—		8	0
Career total			327	47	24	5	27	4	1	0	379	56

=== International ===
Appearances and goals by national team and year
National team	Year	Apps	Goals
Canada	2016	5	1
Canada	2017	5	0
Canada	2018	0	0
Canada	2019	4	1
Canada	2020	0	0
Canada	2021	14	0
Canada	2022	10	2
Canada	2023	8	1
Total		46	5

Scores and results list Canada's goal tally first, score column indicates score after each Vitória goal.

List of international goals scored by Steven Vitória
No.	Date	Venue	Opponent	Score	Result	Competition
1	6 October 2016	Stade de Marrakech, Marrakesh, Morocco	Mauritania	2–0	4–0	Friendly
2	15 November 2019	Exploria Stadium, Orlando, United States	United States	1–3	1–4	2019–20 CONCACAF Nations League A
3	9 June 2022	BC Place, Vancouver, Canada	Curaçao	2–0	4–0	2022–23 CONCACAF Nations League A
4	17 November 2022	Al Maktoum Stadium, Dubai, United Arab Emirates	Japan	1–1	2–1	Friendly
5	9 July 2023	TQL Stadium, Cincinnati, United States	United States	1–1	2–2 (2–3) (p)	2023 CONCACAF Gold Cup

== Honours ==
Olhanense

- Segunda Liga: 2008–09

Estoril

- Segunda Liga: 2011–12

Benfica

- Primeira Liga: 2013–14
- Taça de Portugal: 2013–14
- Taça da Liga: 2013–14
- UEFA Europa League runner-up: 2013–14

Lechia Gdańsk

- Polish Cup: 2018–19

Canada

- CONCACAF Nations League runner-up: 2023

Individual

- CONCACAF Nations League Finals Best XI: 2023
