= Boa Esperança, Espírito Santo =

Boa Esperança
- Municipality
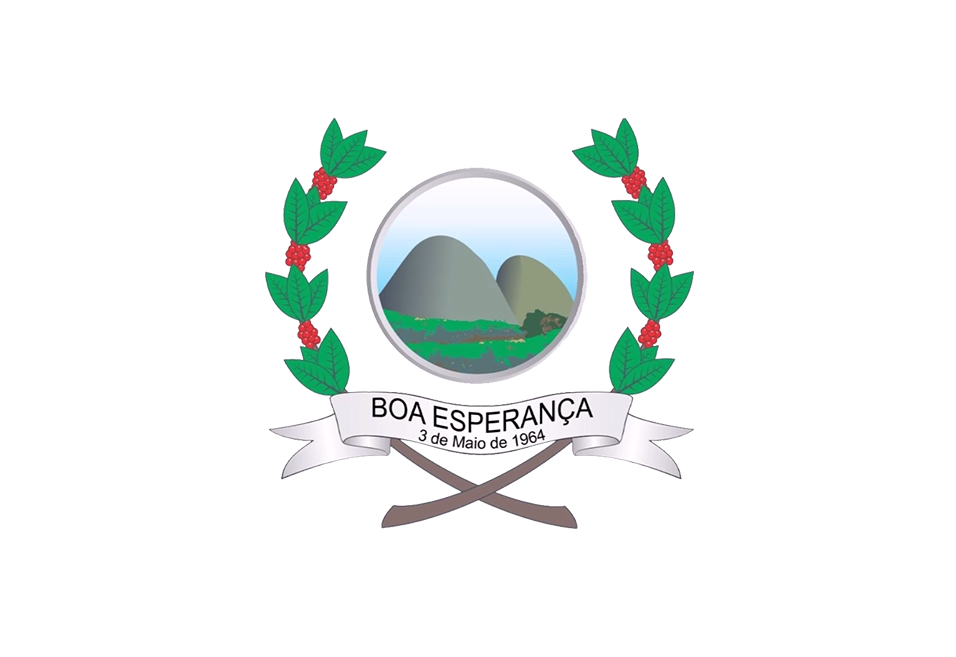
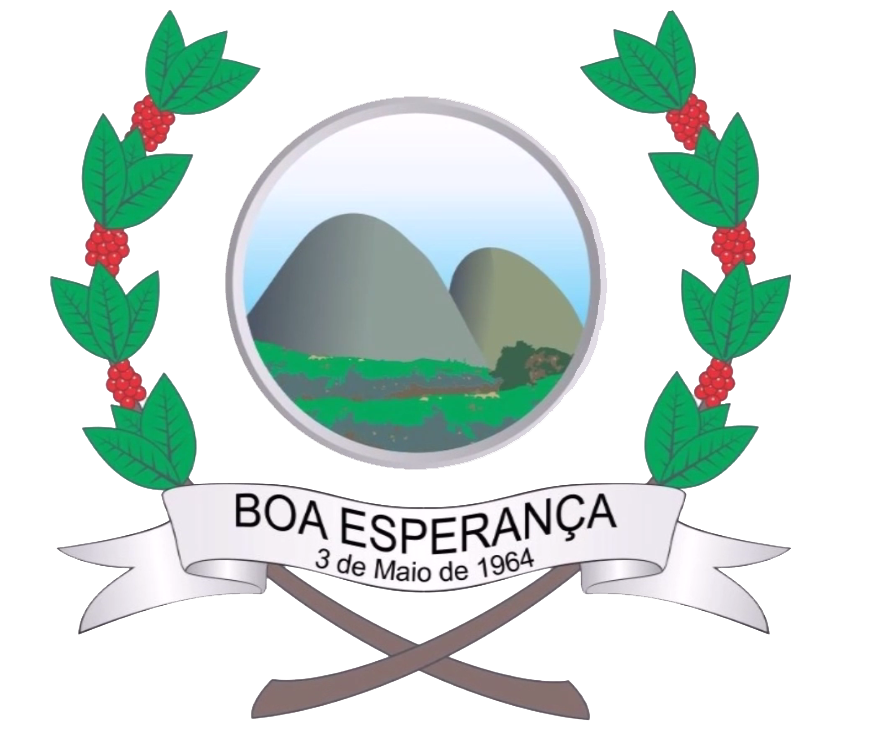
- Flag Coat of arms

- Location in Espírito Santo state

- Location in Brazil
- Coordinates: 18°32′24″S 40°17′45″W
- Country: Brazil
- Region: Southeast
- State: Espírito Santo

Area
  - Total: 429 km^{2} (166 sq mi)

Population (2020)
  - Total: 15,092
  - Density: 35.2/km^{2} (91.1/sq mi)
- Time zone: UTC−3 (BRT)

Boa Esperança is a municipality located in the Brazilian state of Espírito Santo. Its population was 15,092 (2020) and its area is 429 km^{2} (166 sq mi). Its average altitude is 140 meters above sea level.

== Geography ==
=== Climate ===
Climate data for Boa Esperança (1991–2020)
Month	Jan	Feb	Mar	Apr	May	Jun	Jul	Aug	Sep	Oct	Nov	Dec	Year
Mean daily maximum °C (°F)	33.1 (91.6)	33.5 (92.3)	33.0 (91.4)	31.3 (88.3)	29.8 (85.6)	28.8 (83.8)	28.0 (82.4)	28.5 (83.3)	29.7 (85.5)	30.8 (87.4)	30.9 (87.6)	32.0 (89.6)	30.8 (87.4)
Daily mean °C (°F)	26.0 (78.8)	26.2 (79.2)	26.0 (78.8)	24.9 (76.8)	23.2 (73.8)	22.1 (71.8)	21.3 (70.3)	21.5 (70.7)	22.7 (72.9)	23.9 (75.0)	24.6 (76.3)	25.4 (77.7)	24 (75)
Mean daily minimum °C (°F)	20.8 (69.4)	20.9 (69.6)	21.0 (69.8)	20.0 (68.0)	18.1 (64.6)	17.0 (62.6)	16.2 (61.2)	16.2 (61.2)	17.3 (63.1)	18.6 (65.5)	19.5 (67.1)	20.3 (68.5)	18.8 (65.8)
Average precipitation mm (inches)	124.2 (4.89)	92.3 (3.63)	129.9 (5.11)	87.6 (3.45)	45.2 (1.78)	42.1 (1.66)	42.1 (1.66)	37.7 (1.48)	38.1 (1.50)	85.7 (3.37)	214.9 (8.46)	190.7 (7.51)	1,130.5 (44.51)
Average precipitation days (≥ 1.0 mm)	8	7	9	8	5	5	6	6	6	8	12	10	90
Average relative humidity (%)	71.0	70.5	71.8	74.5	75.4	76.3	77.1	75.7	73.7	72.7	73.8	72.7	73.8
Mean monthly sunshine hours	214.4	204.8	196.5	181.0	175.1	167.3	172.3	186.0	162.1	163.0	142.2	177.5	2,142.2
Source: Instituto Nacional de Meteorologia
