= Carraça =

Portuguese footballer (born 1993)

Personal information
- Full name: Rui Filipe Caetano Moura
- Date of birth: 1 March 1993 (age 33)
- Place of birth: Folgosa, Portugal
- Height: 1.77 m (5 ft 9 1/2 in)
- Positions: Right-back; midfielder

Team information
- Current team: Tondela
- Number: 15

Youth career
- 2002–2007: Folgosa Maia
- 2007–2008: Maia
- 2008–2009: Pasteleira
- 2009–2012: Boavista

Senior career*
Years	Team	Apps	(Gls)
2012–2020	Boavista	161	(14)
2014–2015	→ Tondela (loan)	17	(0)
2015–2016	→ Santa Clara (loan)	41	(0)
2020–2023	Porto	2	(0)
2021	Porto B	8	(2)
2021–2022	→ B-SAD (loan)	26	(0)
2022–2023	→ Gil Vicente (loan)	26	(0)
2023–2026	Chaves	80	(2)
2026–	Tondela	1	(0)
- * Club domestic league appearances and goals as of 16:12, 15 August 2026 (UTC)

Rui Filipe Caetano Moura (born 1 March 1993), known as Carraça, is a Portuguese professional footballer who plays mainly as a right-back for Liga Portugal 2 club Tondela.

Developed at Boavista, he went on to make 181 Primeira Liga appearances, also representing Porto (who loaned him to B-SAD and Gil Vicente) and Chaves.

== Club career ==
=== Boavista ===
Born in Folgosa, Maia, Carraça earned his nickname meaning "tick" for his aggressive style of play while at his village club. He finished his development at Boavista F.C. after joining at the age of 16; his first two seasons as a senior were spent in the third division.

From 2014 to 2016, Carraça competed in the Segunda Liga on loan, respectively with C.D. Tondela and C.D. Santa Clara. While with the former team, his first professional game occurred on 31 August 2014 when he played the second half of a 1–1 home draw against Académico de Viseu FC. He contributed eight starts and 809 minutes of action, in an eventual first-ever promotion to the Primeira Liga.

Returned to the Estádio do Bessa for the 2016–17 campaign, Carraça made his debut in the competition on 14 August 2016, playing the entire 2–0 home win over F.C. Arouca. His first league goal arrived on 21 October, awarding the visitors one point with a 1–1 draw at C.S. Marítimo.

A key played under both Erwin Sánchez and his successor Miguel Leal, Carraça renewed his contract with Boavista on 28 December 2016, with the new link running until June 2018.

=== Porto ===
On 12 August 2020, Carraça signed a four-year contract with FC Porto. He took no part in the team until 21 November, when he started in a 2–0 victory at G.D. Fabril in the third round of the Taça de Portugal.

Carraça was loaned to B-SAD on 24 August 2021, for the season. Having provided three assists and missed only eight games as the Lisbon-based side suffered relegation, he moved to Gil Vicente F.C. on the same basis.

On 1 September 2023, Carraça's contract was terminated by mutual agreement.

=== Chaves ===
On 10 October 2023, Carraça agreed to a one-year deal at top-division club G.D. Chaves; this was due to injury to Habib Sylla. He made 20 appearances until the end of the campaign, ended in relegation.

With the team back in the second tier, Carraça scored his first goal on 2 November 2024 to equalise a 2–1 home win over F.C. Paços de Ferreira.

=== Later career ===
Carraça returned to Tondela in summer 2026 one decade after leaving, with the 33-year-old signing a one-year contract.

== Career statistics ==
As of match played 27 May 2023

Appearances and goals by club, season and competition
Club	Season	League			Taça de Portugal		Taça da Liga		Continental		Other		Total	
Club	Season	Division	Apps	Goals	Apps	Goals	Apps	Goals	Apps	Goals	Apps	Goals	Apps	Goals
Boavista	2012–13	Segunda Divisão	26	4	0	0	—		—		—		26	4
Boavista	2013–14	Campeonato Nacional de Seniores	28	4	2	0	—		—		—		30	4
Boavista	Total		54	8	2	0	—		—		—		56	8
Tondela (loan)	2014–15	Segunda Liga	17	0	1	0	2	0	—		—		20	0
Santa Clara	2015–16	LigaPro	41	0	1	0	1	0	—		—		43	0
Boavista	2016–17	Primeira Liga	26	1	2	0	0	0	—		—		28	1
Boavista	2017–18	Primeira Liga	27	3	1	0	1	0	—		—		29	3
Boavista	2018–19	Primeira Liga	24	0	1	0	1	0	—		—		26	0
Boavista	2019–20	Primeira Liga	30	2	1	0	0	0	—		—		31	2
Boavista	Total		107	6	5	0	2	0	—		—		114	6
Porto B	2020–21	Liga Portugal 2	8	2	0	0	0	0	—		—		8	2
Porto	2020–21	Primeira Liga	2	0	1	0	0	0	0	0	0	0	3	0
B-SAD (loan)	2021–22	Primeira Liga	26	0	3	0	0	0	—		—		29	0
Gil Vicente (loan)	2022–23	Primeira Liga	26	0	2	0	3	0	3 (Note: Appearances in UEFA Europa Conference League)	0	—		34	0
Career total			281	16	15	0	8	0	3	0	0	0	307	16

== Honours ==
Tondela

- Segunda Liga: 2014–15
