= João Pedro (footballer, born 3 April 1993) =

Portuguese footballer

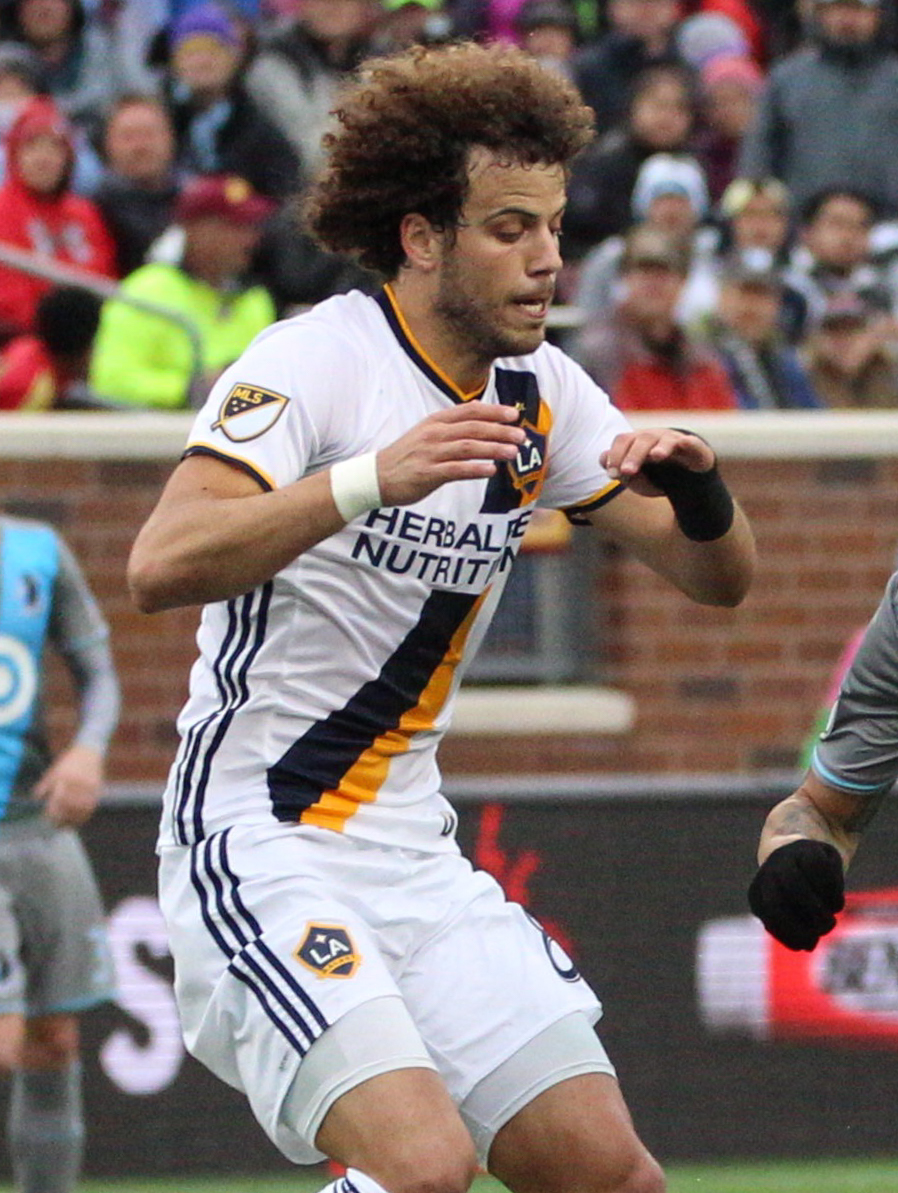
- João Pedro with LA Galaxy in 2017

Personal information
- Full name: João Pedro Almeida Machado
- Date of birth: 3 April 1993 (age 33)
- Place of birth: Vermil, Portugal
- Height: 1.77 m (5 ft 10 in)
- Position: Midfielder

Team information
- Current team: Marco 09
- Number: 35

Youth career
- 2003–2005: Ronfe
- 2005–2012: Vitória Guimarães

Senior career*
Years	Team	Apps	(Gls)
2012−2016	Vitória Guimarães B	118	(5)
2014−2017	Vitória Guimarães	21	(1)
2017−2020	LA Galaxy	31	(1)
2018	LA Galaxy II	5	(0)
2018−2019	→ Apollon Smyrnis (loan)	6	(0)
2019	→ Tondela (loan)	14	(1)
2020−2022	Tondela	92	(17)
2023−2024	Chaves	27	(0)
2024−2025	UTA Arad	23	(3)
2025	Felgueiras	0	(0)
2026	Pevidém	11	(1)
2026–	Marco 09	3	(0)
- * Club domestic league appearances and goals as of 13:31, 10 November 2026 (UTC)

João Pedro Almeida Machado (born 3 April 1993), known as João Pedro, is a Portuguese professional footballer who plays as a midfielder for Liga 3 club Marco 09.

Developed at Vitória de Guimarães, where he was mainly a reserve, he made 154 Primeira Liga appearances for that club, Tondela and Chaves. Abroad, he represented LA Galaxy in Major League Soccer, Apollon Smyrnis in Super League Greece and UTA Arad in Romania.

== Career ==
=== Vitória Guimarães ===
Born in the village of Vermil in Guimarães, João Pedro joined local Vitória SC's youth system at the age of 12. He made his senior debut with their reserves, his first Segunda Liga appearance taking place on 11 November 2012 when he came on as a 73rd-minute substitute in a 0–0 home draw against C.F. Os Belenenses.

João Pedro first appeared with the first team in competitive matches – and in the Primeira Liga – on 4 May 2014, playing injury time in a 0–0 away draw with Académica de Coimbra. In the 2014–15 season he started 42 games for the B side, scoring once to help them finish ninth in the second tier.

João Pedro scored his only goal for Vitória's main squad on 18 December 2016, playing the entire 3–1 home win over Vitória de Setúbal.

=== LA Galaxy ===
On 19 January 2017, João Pedro signed with the LA Galaxy. He made his debut in the Major League Soccer on 4 March, starting and being booked in a 1–2 loss against FC Dallas at StubHub Center. He scored his first goal in the competition on 28 May, contributing to the 4–2 away defeat of the San Jose Earthquakes.

On 20 August 2018, João Pedro joined Super League Greece club Apollon Smyrnis F.C. on loan. He scored his first goal for his new team on 1 November, in a 5–0 home victory over Apollon Paralimnio F.C. in the group stage of the Greek Cup.

=== Tondela ===
João Pedro returned to his homeland after being loaned to C.D. Tondela on a short-team deal on 29 January 2019, and the move was extended in August. On 10 January 2020, he agreed to a permanent contract until June 2022.

On 7 November 2021, João Pedro scored a hat-trick in the first half of a 4–2 home win over C.S. Marítimo, all from the penalty spot.

=== Chaves ===
Unemployed since Tondela's relegation, João Pedro remained in the Portuguese top flight by signing a contract of undisclosed length at G.D. Chaves on 21 January 2023. He totalled 29 appearances during his spell, failing to find the net.

=== UTA Arad ===
On 25 January 2024, João Pedro joined Romanian Liga I club FC UTA Arad on a six-month deal with an option for a further year. On 18 March, he netted twice for the hosts in a 4–3 home victory against FC Voluntari after replacing the injured Marcelo Freitas after 34 minutes; the last goal came deep into injury time.

=== Later career ===
João Pedro returned to Portugal in February 2025, on a contract at second-tier F.C. Felgueiras. However, it was cancelled the following month after the club found out he still had not severed his ties to UTA Arad.

On 14 February 2026, João Pedro joined amateurs Pevidém S.C. in the Braga Football Association.

== Career statistics ==
As of 1 April 2026

Appearances and goals by club, season and competition
Club	Season	League			National cup (Note: Includes Taça de Portugal, U.S. Open Cup, Greek Football Cup and Cupa României)		Taça da Liga		Continental		Other		Total	
Club	Season	Division	Apps	Goals	Apps	Goals	Apps	Goals	Apps	Goals	Apps	Goals	Apps	Goals
Vitória Guimarães B	2012–13	Segunda Liga	22	1	—		—		—		—		22	1
Vitória Guimarães B	2014–15	Segunda Liga	43	1	—		—		—		—		43	1
Vitória Guimarães B	2015–16	Segunda Liga	30	1	—		—		—		—		30	1
Vitória Guimarães B	Total		95	3	—		—		—		—		95	3
Vitória Guimarães	2013–14	Primeira Liga	1	0	0	0	0	0	0	0	—		1	0
Vitória Guimarães	2014–15	Primeira Liga	1	0	0	0	2	0	0	0	—		3	0
Vitória Guimarães	2015–16	Primeira Liga	2	0	0	0	1	0	0	0	—		3	0
Vitória Guimarães	2016–17	Primeira Liga	17	1	1	0	1	0	0	0	—		19	1
Vitória Guimarães	Total		21	1	1	0	4	0	0	0	—		26	1
LA Galaxy	2017	Major League Soccer	28	1	1	0	—		—		—		29	1
LA Galaxy	2018	Major League Soccer	3	0	2	0	—		—		—		5	0
LA Galaxy	Total		31	1	3	0	—		—		—		34	1
LA Galaxy II	2018	USL Championship	5	0	—		—		—		—		5	0
Apollon Smyrnis (loan)	2018–19	Super League Greece	6	0	3	1	—		—		—		9	1
Tondela (loan)	2018–19	Primeira Liga	14	1	—		—		—		—		14	1
Tondela	2019–20	Primeira Liga	32	4	1	0	0	0	—		—		33	4
Tondela	2020–21	Primeira Liga	31	5	2	0	—		—		—		33	5
Tondela	2021–22	Primeira Liga	29	8	5	0	1	0	—		—		35	8
Tondela	Total		92	17	8	0	1	0	—		—		101	17
Chaves	2022–23	Primeira Liga	14	0	—		—		—		—		14	0
Chaves	2023–24	Primeira Liga	13	0	1	0	1	0	—		—		15	0
Chaves	Total		27	0	1	0	1	0	—		—		19	0
UTA Arad	2023–24	Liga I	6	1	—		—		—		8 (Note: Appearances in Liga I relegation group)	3	14	4
UTA Arad	2024–25	Liga I	17	2	2	0	—		—		—		19	2
UTA Arad	Total		23	3	2	0	—		—		8	3	33	6
Career total			314	26	18	1	6	0	0	0	8	3	346	30

== Honours ==
Tondela

- Taça de Portugal runner-up: 2021–22
