= Daniel dos Anjos =

Brazilian footballer (born 1996)

Personal information
- Full name: Daniel da Silva dos Anjos
- Date of birth: 21 January 1996 (age 30)
- Place of birth: Boa Esperança, Espírito Santo, Brazil
- Height: 1.83 m (6 ft 0 in)
- Position: Striker

Team information
- Current team: Becamex Ho Chi Minh City
- Number: 90

Youth career
- 2012–2016: Figueirense
- 2016–2017: Flamengo

Senior career*
Years	Team	Apps	(Gls)
2015–2016	Figueirense	0	(0)
2016–2017	Flamengo	0	(0)
2017	→ Atlético Goianiense (loan)	5	(0)
2017–2021	Benfica B	35	(12)
2021–2024	Tondela	86	(19)
2024	Guarani	4	(0)
2024–2025	União de Leiria	30	(7)
2025–2026	Ninh Binh	11	(4)
2026–	Becamex Ho Chi Minh City	8	(6)
- * Club domestic league appearances and goals as of 21 November 2026

Daniel da Silva dos Anjos (born 21 January 1996) is a Brazilian professional footballer who plays as a striker for V.League 2 club Becamex Ho Chi Minh City.

== Club career ==
Born in Boa Esperança, Anjos arrived at the youth academy of Figueirense in 2012. On 12 April 2015, he made his first team debut in a 3–1 defeat against Joinville in the final of the Campeonato Catarinense. After being promoted to the first team in early 2016, he joined Flamengo on 30 March and was assigned to the under-20 team. On 25 January 2017, he was loaned to the first team of Atlético Goianiense for the season's Campeonato Goiano campaign.

After being released by the Mengão in July 2017, Anjos joined Portuguese club S.L. Benfica and was assigned to its reserve team on 22 July after agreeing to a five-year deal.

On 30 November 2020, dos Anjos tested positive for COVID-19, and in subsequent medical tests post-recovery he was diagnosed with acute myocarditis, which led him to temporarily suspend his career.

On 21 August 2024, dos Anjos returned to Portugal and signed a three-year contract with União de Leiria.

On 31 July 2025, after a month on trial, dos Anjos signed for V.League 1 club Ninh Binh.

In July 2026, dos Anjos moved to V.League 2 club Becamex Ho Chi Minh City.
