= Chima Akas =

Nigerian international footballer

Personal information
- Full name: Chima Uche Akas
- Date of birth: 3 May 1994 (age 32)
- Place of birth: Ibadan, Nigeria
- Height: 1.88 m (6 ft 2 in)
- Positions: Centre-back; left-back

Team information
- Current team: Khaitan

Youth career
- Active Academy Ibadan

Senior career*
Years	Team	Apps	(Gls)
2010–2013	Shooting Stars	65	(8)
2014–2015	Sharks	12	(2)
2016–2017	Enyimba	60	(8)
2018–2019	Kalmar FF	31	(0)
2019–2022	B-SAD	44	(1)
2022–2024	Belenenses	47	(1)
2024–	Khaitan		(1)

International career^{‡}
	Nigeria U17	6	(0)
	Nigeria U20	3	(0)
2015–	Nigeria U23	3	(0)
2015–	Nigeria	11	(0)
- * Club domestic league appearances and goals as of 29 September 2024 ‡ National team caps and goals as of 15:53, 3 May 2017 (UTC)

Chima Akas Uche (born 3 May 1994) is a Nigerian professional footballer who plays as a centre-back or left-back for Kuwaiti club Khaitan and the Nigeria national team.

== Club career ==
After being called up to the full Nigeria international squad, Akas was subject to bids from both Enyimba and Akwa United. After supposedly being offered more money by the latter, he was reported to have signed a contract, and was officially unveiled by the club. The player himself even posted a photo of himself wearing The Promise Keepers jersey on Twitter. However, the transfer was eventually cancelled, and Akas joined Enyimba in March 2016. He was named captain of the NPFL All-Stars in July 2016, and featured in games against Málaga and Valencia.

On 5 December 2022, Akas agreed to join original Belenenses in Liga 3 in January 2023 after playing for the off-shoot club Belenenses SAD for the previous three seasons.

== International career ==
Akas made his senior international debut in a 1–0 friendly defeat by the Ivory Coast in January 2015. He captained his side for qualification for the 2016 African Nations Championship and maintained this status for the full tournament itself.

== International statistics ==
As of match played 20 April 2017.

National team	Year	Apps	Goals
Nigeria	2015	8	0
Nigeria	2016	3	0
Nigeria	2017	0	0
Total		11	0
