= César Sousa =

Angolan footballer

Personal information
- Full name: César Fernando Simões de Sousa
- Date of birth: 20 May 2000 (age 26)
- Place of birth: Lisbon, Portugal
- Height: 1.73 m (5 ft 8 in)
- Position: Midfielder

Team information
- Current team: Atlético CP
- Number: 8

Youth career
- 2016–2017: UDR Santa Maria
- 2017–2018: Loures
- 2018: Sacavenense
- 2018–2020: B-SAD

Senior career*
| Years | Team | Apps | (Gls) |
| 2020–2021 | B-SAD B | 16 | (2) |
| 2021–2022 | B-SAD | 13 | (0) |
| 2023 | Amora | 8 | (0) |
| 2023–2024 | Antequera | 32 | (1) |
| 2024– | Atlético CP | 29 | (1) |

International career^{‡}
| 2021– | Angola | 1 | (0) |
- * Club domestic league appearances and goals as of 7 May 2026 ‡ National team caps and goals as of 18:08, 11 October 2021 (UTC)

César Fernando Simões de Sousa (born 20 May 2000) is a professional footballer who plays as a midfielder for Portuguese Liga 3 club Atlético CP. Born in Portugal, he plays for the Angola national team.

== Playing career ==
Sousa began his senior career with the reserve B-SAD B in the 2020–21 season. He ended up captaining the side, and earned a call up to the senior B-Sad team. He made his professional debut with B-SAD in a 1–1 Primeira Liga loss to S.C. Braga on 11 April 2021. On 6 August 2021, he signed a professional contract with the club until 2025.

== International career ==
Born in Portugal, Sousa is of Angolan descent. He debuted with the Angola national team in a 2–0 2022 FIFA World Cup qualification loss to Gabon on 11 October 2021.
