= Danny Henriques =

Dutch footballer

Personal information
- Full name: Danny Agostinho Henriques
- Date of birth: 29 July 1997 (age 29)
- Place of birth: Rotterdam, Netherlands
- Height: 1.85 m (6 ft 1 in)
- Position: Centre-back

Team information
- Current team: Omonia Aradippou
- Number: 34

Youth career
- 2002–2016: Excelsior
- 2016–2017: Cambuur

Senior career*
Years	Team	Apps	(Gls)
2017–2018	Vilafranquense	6	(0)
2018–2023	Belenenses SAD	56	(1)
2023–2024	FC U Craiova	35	(0)
2024–2026	AEK Larnaca	9	(0)
2025–2026	→ Omonia Aradippou (loan)	26	(0)
2026–	Omonia Aradippou	4	(0)
- * Club domestic league appearances and goals as of 14 June 2026

Danny Agostinho Henriques (born 29 July 1997) is a Dutch professional footballer who plays as a central defender for Cypriot First Division club Omonia Aradippou.

== Club career ==
Henriques was born in Rotterdam in the Netherlands to Portuguese parents. He played youth football with SBV Excelsior and SC Cambuur, before moving to Portugal with U.D. Vilafranquense in the third division.

On 13 June 2018, Henriques signed a three-year contract with Belenenses SAD, being initially assigned to the under-23 team. He made his Primeira Liga debut on 8 February 2020, coming on as an early substitute for the injured Nuno Coelho in a 0–2 home loss against C.D. Santa Clara. He scored his first goal the following weekend, opening the 2–1 away win over Boavista F.C. and later being sent off for two yellow cards.

== Honours ==
AEK Larnaca

- Cypriot Cup: 2024–25
