= Tiago Almeida (footballer, born 2001) =

Portuguese footballer

Personal information
- Full name: Tiago Melo Almeida
- Date of birth: 28 August 2001 (age 25)
- Place of birth: Anadia, Portugal
- Height: 1.77 m (5 ft 10 in)
- Position: Right-back

Team information
- Current team: Sumgayit
- Number: 21

Youth career
- –2019: Anadia
- 2019–2020: Tondela

Senior career*
Years	Team	Apps	(Gls)
2020–2024	Tondela	98	(0)
2024–2026	Chaves	39	(1)
2026–	Sumgayit	4	(0)

International career^{‡}
2022	Portugal U21	1	(0)
- * Club domestic league appearances and goals as of 12 September 2026 ‡ National team caps and goals as of 20:50, 9 December 2025 (UTC)

Tiago Melo Almeida (born 28 August 2001) is a Portuguese professional footballer who plays as a right-back for Azerbaijan Premier League club Sumgayit.

== Career ==
On 13 August 2020 he signed his first professional contract for Tondela.

On 6 August 2024, Almeida signed with Chaves.

== Career statistics ==
=== Club ===
As of match played 7 December 2025

Appearances and goals by club, season and competition
Club	Season	League			National cup		League cup		Other		Total	
Club	Season	Division	Apps	Goals	Apps	Goals	Apps	Goals	Apps	Goals	Apps	Goals
Tondela	2019–20	Primeira Liga	3	0	0	0	0	0	—		3	0
Tondela	2020–21	Primeira Liga	22	0	0	0	—		—		22	0
Tondela	2021–22	Primeira Liga	24	0	3	0	1	0	—		28	0
Tondela	2022–23	Liga Portugal 2	30	0	2	0	4	0	1 (Note: Appearance in Supertaça Cândido de Oliveira)	0	37	0
Tondela	2023–24	Liga Portugal 2	19	0	3	0	2	0	—		24	0
Tondela	Total		98	0	8	0	7	0	1	0	114	0
Chaves	2024–25	Liga Portugal 2	10	0	1	0	—		—		11	0
Chaves	2025–26	Liga Portugal 2	14	0	1	0	—		—		15	0
Chaves	Total		24	0	2	0	—		—		26	0
Career total			122	0	10	0	7	0	1	0	140	0
