= Alioune Ndour (footballer, born 2001) =

Senegalese footballer

Personal information
- Date of birth: 3 March 2001 (age 25)
- Place of birth: Dakar, Senegal
- Height: 1.88 m (6 ft 2 in)
- Position: Forward

Team information
- Current team: Dibba Al-Hisn
- Number: 45

Youth career
- FC Karack

Senior career*
Years	Team	Apps	(Gls)
2018–2019	FC Karack		
2019–2020	MFK Vyškov	0	(0)
2019–2020	→ Loudoun United (loan)	15	(5)
2020–2023	B-SAD	22	(2)
2021	B-SAD B	1	(0)
2022–2023	→ Châteauroux (loan)	25	(3)
2022–2023	→ Châteauroux II (loan)	2	(1)
2023–2025	Estrela da Amadora	9	(0)
2024	→ Zorya Luhansk (loan)	11	(0)
2025–	Dibba Al-Hisn	0	(0)
- * Club domestic league appearances and goals as of 1 March 2025

Alioune Ndour (born 3 March 2001) is a Senegalese professional footballer who plays as a forward for Dibba Al-Hisn.

== Career ==
Ndour began his career in Senegal with FC Karack, before moving to the Czech Republic in 2019 with Vyskov.

On 30 September 2019, Ndour moved to the United States, joining USL Championship side Loudoun United FC. On 7 January 2020, Loudoun announced Ndour would return for the 2020 USL season.

On 21 October 2020, Ndour joined Primeira Liga side B-SAD on a 5-year deal.

On 2 September 2022, Ndour joined French club Châteauroux in Championnat National on loan for the 2022–23 season.

On 5 August 2023, recently-promoted to Primeira Liga side Estrela da Amadora announced the permanent signing of Ndour on a two-year contract. In February 2024, Estrela sent Ndour on loan to Ukrainian Premier League club Zorya Luhansk until the end of the 2023–24 season, with an optional buy-clause reported to be around €300.000. He moved on to Dibba Al-Hisn SC in February 2025.
