= Jota Gonçalves =

Portuguese footballer

Personal information
- Full name: João Paulo Marques Gonçalves
- Date of birth: 17 June 2000 (age 26)
- Place of birth: Espinho, Portugal
- Height: 1.86 m (6 ft 1 in)
- Position: Centre-back

Team information
- Current team: Vizela
- Number: 6

Youth career
- 2008–2009: Espinho
- 2009–2010: Feirense
- 2010–2016: Espinho
- 2016–2017: Académica
- 2017–2018: Feirense
- 2018–2020: Tondela

Senior career*
Years	Team	Apps	(Gls)
2020–2024	Tondela	47	(0)
2024–2026	Vizela	55	(0)
2026–	Hapoel Ramat Gan	0	(0)
- * Club domestic league appearances and goals as of 19 June 2026

João Paulo "Jota" Marques Gonçalves (born 17 June 2000) is a Portuguese professional footballer who plays as a centre-back for Israeli Premier League club Hapoel Ramat Gan.

== Playing career ==
Gonçalves made his professional debut with Tondela in a 3–2 Primeira Liga loss to Gil Vicente on 14 July 2020.

On 2 January 2024, after having spent the previous one-and-a-half seasons with Tondela in the Liga Portugal 2, Gonçalves joined Primeira Liga side Vizela, signing a contract until 2026.
