= Ricardo Alves (footballer, born 1991) =

Portuguese footballer

Personal information
- Full name: Ricardo Miguel Martins Alves
- Date of birth: 9 May 1991 (age 35)
- Place of birth: Vila Nova de Cerveira, Portugal
- Height: 1.81 m (5 ft 11 in)
- Position: Centre-back

Team information
- Current team: Chaves
- Number: 34

Youth career
- 2000–2006: Cerveira
- 2006–2009: Sporting CP
- 2009–2010: Académica

Senior career*
Years	Team	Apps	(Gls)
2010–2011	Tourizense	28	(0)
2011–2014	Marítimo B	92	(2)
2013–2014	Marítimo	0	(0)
2014–2015	Concordia Chiajna	28	(1)
2015–2017	Astra Giurgiu	8	(0)
2017–2018	Leixões	33	(3)
2018–2025	Tondela	156	(10)
2025–	Chaves	17	(0)

International career
2010–2011	Portugal U20	4	(0)
2011	Portugal U21	1	(0)
- * Club domestic league appearances and goals as of 20 June 2026

Ricardo Miguel Martins Alves (born 9 May 1991) is a Portuguese professional footballer who plays as a central defender for Liga Portugal 2 club G.D. Chaves.

== Club career ==
Alves was born in Vila Nova de Cerveira, Viana do Castelo District. He spent his first two years as a senior in the third division with G.D. Tourizense and C.S. Marítimo's reserves, playing 25 matches (24 starts) for the latter during the 2011–12 season as they finished in 12th position but were still promoted to the Segunda Liga, being registered in the competition at the same time as several other reserve teams.

Alves made his professional debut for Marítimo B on 12 August 2012, playing the entire 1–0 away loss against Leixões S.C. and being booked in the process. His first goal in the second tier came the following month, in the 1–0 home win over Portimonense SC.

In the summer of 2014, Alves moved to the Romanian Liga I after signing with CS Concordia Chiajna. His first game in top-flight football took place on 17 August, in a 2–0 defeat away to ASA 2013 Târgu Mureș. He switched to FC Astra Giurgiu in the same league at the end of the campaign, being rarely played during his two-year spell.

Alves returned to Portugal in June 2017, joining Leixões on a two-year contract. In the following off-season, however, he left for C.D. Tondela of the Primeira Liga on a three-year deal.

On 8 December 2018, Alves made his debut in the Portuguese top division on 8 December 2018, coming on as a first-half substitute for the injured Ricardo Costa in an eventual 0–1 home loss against S.C. Braga. He scored his first league goal on 5 January 2020, opening the 1–1 draw with Gil Vicente F.C. also at the Estádio João Cardoso.

== International career ==
Alves won his only cap for Portugal at under-21 level on 3 June 2011, playing the second half of the 2–0 friendly victory over Austria held in Faro, Algarve.

== Honours ==
Astra Giurgiu

- Liga I: 2015–16

Tondela

- Liga Portugal 2: 2024–25
