= 2022–23 F.C. Paços de Ferreira season =

F.C. Paços de Ferreira
2022–23 season
- Chairman: Paulo Meneses
- Manager: César Peixoto (until 16 October); José Mota (18 October - 15 December); César Peixoto (from )
- Stadium: Estádio da Mata Real
- Primeira Liga: 16th
- Taça de Portugal: Third round
- Taça da Liga: Group stage
- Top goalscorer: League: Adrián Butzke (6); All: Adrián Butzke (6)
- Highest home attendance: 8,060 vs Benfica (26 January 2023)
- Lowest home attendance: 655 vs Casa Pia (20 November 2022)
- Average home league attendance: 4,349(7 May 2023)
Home colours	Away colours
- All statistics correct as of 6 February 2023.

The 2022–23 season is the 72nd season in the history of F.C. Paços de Ferreira and their fourth consecutive season in the top flight. The club are participating in the Primeira Liga, the Taça de Portugal, and the Taça da Liga.

== Squad ==
As of match played 27 May 2023

No.	Name	Nationality	Position	Date of birth (age)	Signed from	Signed in	Contract ends	Apps.	Goals
Goalkeepers
24	José Oliveira	(Portugal)	GK	6 April 2002 (aged 21)	Academy	2019		6	0
28	José Marafona	(Portugal)	GK	8 May 1987 (aged 36)	Alanyaspor	2023		35	0
98	Igor Vekić	(Slovenia)	GK	6 May 1998 (aged 25)	on loan from Bravo	2022	2023	15	0
Defenders
3	Nuno Lima	(Portugal)	DF	16 March 2001 (aged 22)	Academy	2020		47	1
4	Pedro Ganchas	(Portugal)	DF	31 May 2000 (aged 22)	Benfica	2022		8	0
5	Vitorino Antunes	(Portugal)	DF	1 April 1987 (aged 36)	Sporting CP	2021		111	10
20	Luís Bastos	(Portugal)	DF	10 September 2001 (aged 21)	Academy	2020		20	0
21	Jorge Silva	(Portugal)	DF	22 March 1996 (aged 27)	Leixões	2019		58	0
23	Erick Ferigra	(Ecuador)	DF	7 February 1999 (aged 24)	Las Palmas	2022		18	0
25	Maracás	(Brazil)	DF	27 April 1994 (aged 29)	on loan from Al Wahda	2023	2023	101	2
27	João Vigário	(Portugal)	DF	20 November 1995 (aged 27)	Nacional	2021		3	0
32	Flávio Ramos	(Brazil)	DF	12 May 1994 (aged 29)	Feirense	2021		23	1
33	Vasco Sousa	(Portugal)	DF	6 April 2004 (aged 19)	Academy	2021		1	0
Midfielders
6	Jordan Holsgrove	(Scotland)	MF	10 September 1999 (aged 23)	Celta de Vigo	2022		27	2
10	Nicolás Gaitán	(Argentina)	MF	23 February 1988 (aged 35)	Peñarol	2022		35	5
15	Juan Delgado	(Chile)	MF	5 March 1993 (aged 30)	Necaxa	2021		74	2
16	Matchoi Djaló	(Portugal)	MF	10 April 2003 (aged 20)	Academy	2019		61	3
18	Tiago Ribeiro	(Portugal)	MF	14 March 2002 (aged 21)	on loan from AS Monaco	2023	2023	5	0
22	Luíz Carlos	(Brazil)	MF	5 July 1985 (aged 37)	Ankaraspor	2019		229	7
26	Rui Pires	(Portugal)	MF	22 March 1998 (aged 25)	Troyes	2022		61	0
55	Paulo Bernardo	(Portugal)	MF	24 January 2002 (aged 21)	on loan from Benfica	2023	2023	13	2
70	Hernâni Infande	(Guinea-Bissau)	MF	3 April 2001 (aged 22)	on loan from Braga	2023	2023	10	1
Forwards
7	Nigel Thomas	(Netherlands)	FW	1 February 2001 (aged 22)	PSV Eindhoven	2022		37	4
9	Zé Uilton	(Brazil)	FW	25 July 1992 (aged 30)	Grêmio Anápolis	2018		167	11
11	Fábio Gomes	(Brazil)	FW	25 May 1997 (aged 26)	on loan from Atlético Mineiro	2023	2023	9	0
17	Adrián Butzke	(Spain)	FW	30 March 1999 (aged 24)	on loan from Granada	2022	2023	29	6
30	Alexandre Guedes	(Portugal)	FW	11 February 1994 (aged 29)	Albirex Niigata	2023		16	1
41	Mauro Couto	(Portugal)	FW	15 November 2005 (aged 17)	Academy	2022		8	0
Out on loan
	Jeimes	(Brazil)	GK	28 April 2001 (aged 22)	Santos	2019		2	0
	Guilherme Pio	(Portugal)	DF	22 September 2003 (aged 19)	Academy	2021		1	0
	Adriano Castanheira	(Portugal)	MF	30 January 1998 (aged 25)	Covilhã	2020		38	2
	Miguel Mota	(Portugal)	MF	26 August 2003 (aged 19)	Academy	2021		0	0
	Cristian Parano	(Argentina)	FW	16 August 1999 (aged 23)	San Antonio	2021		0	0
	Edmilson Mendes	(Guinea-Bissau)	FW	20 March 2003 (aged 20)	Academy	2021		2	0
Left during the season
1	Jordi	(Brazil)	GK	3 September 1993 (aged 29)	Vasco da Gama	2020		43	0
8	Abbas Ibrahim	(Nigeria)	MF	2 January 1998 (aged 25)	Academy	2018		52	1
11	Kayky	(Brazil)	FW	11 June 2003 (aged 19)	on loan from Manchester City	2022	2023	9	0
13	Arthur Sales	(Brazil)	FW	3 July 2002 (aged 20)	on loan from Lommel	2022	2023	14	0
14	Bastien Toma	(Switzerland)	MF	24 June 1999 (aged 23)	on loan from Genk	2022	2023	17	0
19	N'Dri Koffi	(Ivory Coast)	FW	9 March 2002 (aged 21)	on loan from Stade de Reims	2022	2023	15	2
23	Lucas Silva	(Brazil)	FW	30 January 1998 (aged 25)	Flamengo	2020		49	4
29	Fernando Fonseca	(Portugal)	DF	14 March 1997 (aged 26)	Gil Vicente	2020		71	0
34	Tiago Ilori	(Portugal)	DF	26 February 1993 (aged 30)	on loan from Sporting CP	2022	2023	4	0

=== Out on loan ===
Note: Flags indicate national team as defined under FIFA eligibility rules; some limited exceptions apply. Players may hold more than one non-FIFA nationality.

No.	Pos.	Nation	Player
—	GK	BRA	Jeimes (at Montalegre until 30 June 2023)
—	DF	POR	Guilherme Pio (at Montalegre until 30 June 2023)
—	MF	POR	Adriano Castanheira (at Penafiel until 30 June 2023)
—	MF	POR	Miguel Mota (at Montalegre until 30 June 2023)

No.	Pos.	Nation	Player
—	MF	POR	Bruno Silva (at Bragança until 30 June 2023)
—	FW	ARG	Cristian Parano (at San Antonio until 30 November 2022)
—	FW	GBS	Edmilson Mendes (at Montalegre until 30 June 2023)

== Transfers ==
=== In ===
Date	Position	Nationality	Name	From	Fee	Ref.
27 June 2022	MF	(Scotland)	Jordan Holsgrove	Celta de Vigo	Undisclosed	
28 June 2022	FW	(Brazil)	João Magno	Canelas 2010	Undisclosed	
7 July 2022	FW	(Netherlands)	Nigel Thomas	PSV Eindhoven	Undisclosed	
23 August 2022	DF	(Ecuador)	Erick Ferigra	Las Palmas	Free	
15 December 2022	FW	(Portugal)	Alexandre Guedes	Albirex Niigata	Undisclosed	
4 January 2023	GK	(Portugal)	José Marafona	Alanyaspor	Undisclosed	

=== Loans in ===
Start date	Position	Nationality	Name	From	End date	Ref.
19 July 2022	FW	(Brazil)	Arthur Sales	Lommel	9 March 2023	
22 July 2022	DF	(Portugal)	Tiago Ilori	Sporting CP	17 February 2023	
11 August 2022	FW	(Ivory Coast)	N'Dri Koffi	Stade de Reims	31 December 2022	
13 August 2022	FW	(Brazil)	Kayky	Manchester City	31 December 2022	
24 August 2022	FW	(Spain)	Adrián Butzke	Granada	30 June 2023	
31 August 2022	MF	(Switzerland)	Bastien Toma	Genk	31 January 2023	
1 September 2022	GK	(Slovenia)	Igor Vekić	NK Bravo	30 June 2023	
3 January 2023	DF	(Brazil)	Maracás	Al Wahda	30 June 2023	
15 January 2023	FW	(Brazil)	Fábio Gomes	Atlético Mineiro	30 June 2023	
31 January 2023	MF	(Portugal)	Paulo Bernardo	Benfica	30 June 2023	
31 January 2023	MF	(Guinea-Bissau)	Hernâni Infande	Braga	30 June 2023	
31 January 2023	MF	(Portugal)	Tiago Ribeiro	AS Monaco	30 June 2023	

=== Out ===
Date	Position	Nationality	Name	To	Fee	Ref.
22 June 2022	MF	(Australia)	Samuel Silvera	Central Coast Mariners	Undisclosed	
5 July 2022	MF	(Canada)	Stephen Eustáquio	Porto	Undisclosed	
20 July 2022	GK	(Portugal)	André Ferreira	Granada	Undisclosed	
31 July 2022	FW	(Brazil)	João Magno	F91 Dudelange	Undisclosed	
4 August 2022	MF	(France)	Mohamed Diaby	Portimonense	Undisclosed	
16 August 2022	FW	(Brazil)	Lucas Silva	Avaí	Undisclosed	
5 September 2022	FW	(Israel)	Dor Jan	Ashdod	Undisclosed	
4 February 2023	MF	(Nigeria)	Abbas Ibrahim	Zira	Undisclosed	
2 April 2023	GK	(Brazil)	Jordi	Novorizontino	Undisclosed	

=== Loans out ===
Start date	Position	Nationality	Name	To	End date	Ref.
1 July 2022	MF	(Portugal)	Adriano Castanheira	Penafiel	30 June 2023	
1 August 2022	DF	(Portugal)	Guilherme Pio	Montalegre	30 June 2023	
1 August 2022	DF	(Portugal)	Miguel Mota	Montalegre	30 June 2023	
1 August 2022	FW	(Guinea-Bissau)	Edmilson Mendes	Montalegre	30 June 2023	
17 August 2022	MF	(Argentina)	Cristian Parano	San Antonio	30 November 2022	
30 August 2022	MF	(Portugal)	Bruno Silva	Bragança	30 June 2023	
31 August 2022	GK	(Brazil)	Jeimes	Montalegre	30 June 2023	

=== Released ===
Date	Position	Nationality	Name	Joined	Date	Ref
15 February 2023	DF	(Portugal)	Fernando Fonseca			

== Pre-season and friendlies ==
Win Draw Loss Fixtures

2 July 2022 Friendly	Paços de Ferreira	3–0	Seleção Concelhia	Paços de Ferreira
18:00 WEST (UTC+1)	Martelo 2'; Jan 45'; Delgado 60'			Stadium: Estádio da Mata Real

9 July 2022 Friendly	Oliveirense	0–1	Paços de Ferreira	Oliveira de Azeméis
10:30 WEST (UTC+1)			Djaló 20'	Stadium: Estádio Carlos Osório

13 July 2022 Friendly	Moreirense	0–0	Paços de Ferreira	Moreira de Cónegos
10:30 WEST (UTC+1)				Stadium: Parque de Jogos Comendador Joaquim de Almeida Freitas

16 July 2022 Friendly	Rio Ave	0–0	Paços de Ferreira	Vila do Conde
10:30 WEST (UTC+1)

20 July 2022 Friendly	Paços de Ferreira	1–0	Santa Clara	Paços de Ferreira
18:00 WEST (UTC+1)	Martelo 68'			Stadium: Estádio da Mata Real

23 July 2022 Friendly	Paços de Ferreira	1–0	Famalicão	Paços de Ferreira
10:30 WEST (UTC+1)	Sales 66'			Stadium: Estádio da Mata Real

23 July 2022 Friendly	Paços de Ferreira	0–1	Trofense	Paços de Ferreira
18:00 WEST (UTC+1)			Pachu 68'	Stadium: Estádio da Mata Real

30 July 2022 Solverde Cup	Paços de Ferreira	1–2	Vizela	Paços de Ferreira
10:30 WEST (UTC+1)	Uilton 90+2'		Mendez 22'; Moreira 82'	Stadium: Estádio da Mata Real

== Competitions ==
=== Overall record ===
Competition	First match	Last match	Starting round	Final position	Record							
Competition	First match	Last match	Starting round	Final position	Pld	W	D	L	GF	GA	GD	Win %
Primeira Liga	8 August 2022	27 May 2023	Matchday 1	17th	34	6	5	23	26	62	−36	17.65
Taça de Portugal	16 October 2022		Third round	Third round	1	0	0	1	0	2	−2	0.00
Taça da Liga	20 November 2022	11 December 2022	Group stage	Group stage	3	0	2	1	2	4	−2	0.00
Total					38	6	7	25	28	68	−40	15.79

Last updated: 27 May 2023
Source: Soccerway

=== Primeira Liga ===
==== League table ====
Pos	Team	Pld	W	D	L	GF	GA	GD	Pts	Qualification or relegation
14	Estoril	34	10	5	19	33	49	−16	35	
15	Portimonense	34	10	4	20	25	48	−23	34	
16	Marítimo (R)	34	7	5	22	32	63	−31	26	Qualification for the relegation play-offs
17	Paços de Ferreira (R)	34	6	5	23	26	62	−36	23	Relegation to Liga Portugal 2
18	Santa Clara (R)	34	5	7	22	26	58	−32	22	Relegation to Liga Portugal 2

Source: Liga Portugal
Rules for classification: 1) Points; 2) Head-to-head points; 3) Head-to-head goal difference; 4) Goal difference; 5) Matches won; 6) Goals scored; 7) Play-off.
(R) Relegated

==== Results summary ====
Overall								Home						Away					
Pld	W	D	L	GF	GA	GD	Pts	W	D	L	GF	GA	GD	W	D	L	GF	GA	GD
34	6	5	23	26	62	−36	23	3	2	12	13	33	−20	3	3	11	13	29	−16

Last updated: 27 May 2023.
Source: Liga Portugal

==== Results by round ====
Round	1	2	3	4	5	6	7	8	9	10	11	12	13	14	15	16	17	18	19	20	21	22	23	24	25	26	27	28	29	30	31	32	33	34
Ground	A	H	H	A	A	H	A	H	H	A	H	A	H	A	H	A	H	H	H	A	A	H	A	H	A	A	H	A	H	A	H	A	H	A
Result	L	L	L	L	L	L	D	D	L	L	L	L	L	L	D	W	L	L	W	L	W	L	L	W	D	D	L	L	L	W	L	L	W	L
Position	15	16	17	17	18	17	17	17	17	17	18	18	18	18	18	18	18	18	18	18	18	18	18	17	16	17	17	17	17	17	17	17	17	17

Updated to match(es) played on 27 May 2023. Source: Liga Portugal
A = Away; H = Home; W = Win; D = Draw; L = Loss

==== Matches ====
The league fixtures were announced on 5 July 2022.

7 August 2022 1	Gil Vicente	1–0	Paços de Ferreira	Barcelos
20:15 WEST (UTC+1)	Gomes (yellow card) 65'; Alipour 85'	Report	Pires (yellow card) 32'; Delgado (yellow card) 45'; Holsgrove (yellow card) 53'; Antunes (yellow card) 63'; Jordi (yellow card) 67'; Matchoi (yellow card) 81'	Stadium: Estádio Cidade de Barcelos; Attendance: 4,871; Referee: André Narciso

15 August 2022 2	Paços de Ferreira	0–3	Portimonense	Paços de Ferreira
20:30 WEST (UTC+1)	Uilton (red card) 16'; Matchoi (yellow card) 45+2'; Delgado (yellow card) 66'; Holsgrove (yellow card) 73'	Report	Cariello 32'; Estrela (yellow card) 50'; Willyan (yellow card) 55'; Portugal (yellow card) 60'; Welinton Júnior (yellow card) 66'; Relvas (yellow card) 66'; Luquinha 80'; Ewerton 84'	Stadium: Estádio da Mata Real; Attendance: 2,661; Referee: João Pinheiro

26 August 2022 4	Paços de Ferreira	0–3	Estoril	Paços de Ferreira
20:30 WEST (UTC+1)	Kayky (yellow card) 15'; Matchoi (red card) 53'; Butzke (yellow card) 77' (yellow-red card) 89'	Report	Carlos 26', 43'; Siliki 72'	Stadium: Estádio da Mata Real; Attendance: 2,469; Referee: Carlos Macedo

30 August 2022 3	Benfica	3–2	Paços de Ferreira	Lisbon
20:15 WEST (UTC+1)	R. Silva (yellow card) 16'; Neres 42'; João Mário 45+4' (pen.); Ramos 56'; Fernández (yellow card) 83'	Report	Holsgrove (yellow card) 14'; Ramos (yellow card) 34'; Koffi 39', 80'; Oliveira (yellow card) 45+2'; Ibrahim (yellow card) 89'	Stadium: Estádio da Luz; Attendance: 55,151; Referee: Artur Soares Dias

5 September 2022 5	Boavista	1–0	Paços de Ferreira	Porto
19:00 WEST (UTC+1)	Sasso (yellow card) 22'; Lourenço (yellow card) 39'; Boženík (yellow card) 44' (goal) 58'; Cannon (yellow card) 65'	Report	Matchoi (yellow card) 13'; Lima (yellow card) 45+1'; Uilton (yellow card) 45+5'	Stadium: Estádio do Bessa; Attendance: 4,831; Referee: Claúdio Pereira

11 September 2022 6	Paços de Ferreira	2–3	Casa Pia	Paços de Ferreira
15:30 WEST (UTC+1)	Butzke 18', 90+6'; Delgado (yellow card) 55'; Lima (yellow card) 66'	Report	V.Fernandes (yellow card) 43'; Bolgado (yellow card) 52'; Godwin 58'; Neto 60' (yellow card) 65'; Clayton 75' (yellow card) 90'	Stadium: Estádio da Mata Real; Attendance: 4,112; Referee: Tiago Martins

17 September 2022 7	Santa Clara	1–1	Paços de Ferreira	Ponta Delgada
14:30 WEST (UTC+1)	Silva 7'; Henrique (yellow card) 13'; Calila (yellow card) 63'; Allano (yellow card) 72'; Carvalho (yellow card) 90+3'	Report	Matchoi (yellow card) 41' (goal) 53'; Thomas (yellow card) 57'; Delgado (yellow card) 65'	Stadium: Estádio de São Miguel; Attendance: 2,123; Referee: Rui Costa

2 October 2022 8	Paços de Ferreira	1–1	Arouca	Paços de Ferreira
18:00 WEST (UTC+1)	Pires (yellow card) 11'; Antunes (yellow card) 28'; Ibrahim (yellow card) 54'; Gaitán 60'	Report	Antony (yellow card) 75'; Esgaio (yellow card) 78'; Dabbagh 84'	Stadium: Estádio da Mata Real; Attendance: 4,431; Referee: Hélder Malheiro

8 October 2022 9	Paços de Ferreira	0–1	Vitória de Guimarães	Paços de Ferreira
20:30 WEST (UTC+1)	Pires (yellow card) 11'; Matchoi (yellow card) 52'; Antunes (yellow card) 60' (yellow-red card) 89'; Ferigra (yellow card) 76'; Lima (yellow card) 86' (yellow-red card) 90+3'	Report	Nelson da Luz 8'; Amaro (yellow card) 24' (yellow-red card) 41'; Bamba (yellow card) 45+2'; Safira (yellow card) 63'; André (yellow card) 74'; Afonso (yellow card) 87'; Jota (yellow card) 90+4'	Stadium: Estádio da Mata Real; Attendance: 5,346; Referee: Nuno Almeida

22 October 2022 10	Famalicão	2–1	Paços de Ferreira	Vila Nova de Famalicão
15:30 WEST (UTC+1)	Kadile 20'; Youssouf (yellow card) 42'; Moura 46'; Rodríguez (yellow card) 66'	Report	Thomas 23'; Pires (yellow card) 31'; Antunes (yellow card) 64'; Toma (yellow card) 66'	Stadium: Estádio Municipal 22 de Junho; Attendance: 2,380; Referee: Miguel Nogueira

28 October 2022 11	Paços de Ferreira	0–1	Marítimo	Paços de Ferreira
20:15 WEST (UTC+1)	Matchoi (yellow card) 55'; Butzke (yellow card) 73'	Report	Ramírez 28'; V.Costa (yellow card) 72'; Afonso (yellow card) 74'; Beltrame (yellow card) 90+1'; E.Costa (yellow card) 90+4'	Stadium: Estádio da Mata Real; Attendance: 3,067; Referee: André Narciso

5 November 2022 12	Porto	4–0	Paços de Ferreira	Porto
18:00 WET (UTC)	Evanilson 4', 39'; Taremi 31'; Delgado 55' (o.g.); Grujić (yellow card) 68'; Mário (yellow card) 82'	Report	Pires (yellow card) 44'; Delgado (yellow card) 69'; Matchoi (yellow card) 88'	Stadium: Estádio do Dragão; Attendance: 41,730; Referee: Manuel Oliveira

13 November 2022 13	Paços de Ferreira	0–2	Vizela	Paços de Ferreira
15:30 WET (UTC)	Ibrahim (yellow card) 35'	Report	Igor Julião (yellow card) 11'; Guzzo (yellow card) 36'; Etim (yellow card) 48'; Ferigra 52' (o.g.); Mendez (yellow card) 72'; Samu (yellow card) 90+3'	Stadium: Estádio da Mata Real; Attendance: 5,182; Referee: Nuno Almeida

28 December 2022 14	Sporting CP	3–0	Paços de Ferreira	Lisbon
15:30 WET (UTC)	Porro 3'; Santos 22'; Paulinho 44'; Gonçalves (yellow card) 68'; Essugo (red card) 82'	Report	Ferigra (yellow card) 24'; Gaitán (yellow card) 30'; Matchoi (yellow card) 76'; Holsgrove (yellow card) 90'	Stadium: Estádio José Alvalade; Attendance: 31,005; Referee: António Nobre

8 January 2023 15	Paços de Ferreira	1–1	Chaves	Paços de Ferreira
15:30 WET (UTC)	Uilton (yellow card) 4' (goal) 74'; Luíz Carlos (yellow card) 17'; Delgado (yellow card) 26'; Antunes (yellow card) 28'; Holsgrove (yellow card) 53'; Maracás (yellow card) 55'	Report	Issah (yellow card) 29'; Teixeira (yellow card) 37'; Juninho 67'; Habib (yellow card) 83'; Langa (yellow card) 89'; Vítor (yellow card) 90+2'	Stadium: Estádio da Mata Real; Attendance: 2,466; Referee: Fábio Veríssimo

14 January 2023 16	Rio Ave	0–1	Paços de Ferreira	Vila do Conde
18:00 WET (UTC)	Sá (yellow card) 27'; Samaris (yellow card) 41'; Graça (yellow card) 68'; Guga (yellow card) 90+3'; Boateng (yellow card) 90+6'	Report	Thomas (yellow card) 15' (goal) 34'; Antunes (yellow card) 41'; Marafona (yellow card) 44'; Matchoi (yellow card) 49'; Uilton (yellow card) 74'; Lima (yellow card) 90+4'	Stadium: Estádio dos Arcos; Attendance: 2,310; Referee: Ricardo Baixinho

21 January 2023 17	Paços de Ferreira	1–2	Braga	Paços de Ferreira
15:30 WET (UTC)	Luíz Carlos (yellow card) 37'; Holsgrove 68'; Marafona (yellow card) 83'; Maracás (red card) 90+9'	Report	Sequeira (yellow card) 20'; Horta (yellow card) 37'; Vitinha 58' (yellow card) 81'; Banza 90+8'; S.Carvalho (yellow card) 90+12'	Stadium: Estádio da Mata Real; Attendance: 5,904; Referee: Claúdio Pereira

26 January 2023 18	Paços de Ferreira	0–2	Benfica	Paços de Ferreira
20:15 WET (UTC)		Report	Grimaldo 7'; João Mário 11'; Guedes (yellow card) 37'; Luís (yellow card) 71'	Stadium: Estádio da Mata Real; Attendance: 8,060; Referee: Luís Godinho

31 January 2023 19	Paços de Ferreira	2–1	Gil Vicente	Paços de Ferreira
19:00 WET (UTC)	Butzke 34'; Lima (yellow card) 58'; Pires (yellow card) 80'; Marafona (yellow card) 81'	Report	Alipour (yellow card) 42'; Fran Navarro 68'; T.Araújo (yellow card) 89'	Stadium: Estádio da Mata Real; Attendance: 2,901; Referee: Bruno José Costa

6 February 2023 20	Portimonense	1–0	Paços de Ferreira	Portimão
19:00 WET (UTC)	Klismahn (yellow card) 64'; Maurício 90+7'	Report	Maracás (yellow card) 39' (yellow-red card) 47'; Delgado (yellow card) 69'	Stadium: Estádio Municipal de Portimão; Attendance: 745; Referee: Miguel Nogueira

18 February 2023 21	Estoril	1–3	Paços de Ferreira	Alcabideche
18:00 WET (UTC)	Geraldes 50'	Report	Butzke 16'; Thomas 26'; Luíz Carlos (yellow card) 45+1'; Holsgrove (yellow card) 63' (goal) 64'; Uilton (yellow card) 72'	Stadium: Estádio António Coimbra da Mota; Attendance: 2,052; Referee: Nuno Almeida

26 February 2023 22	Paços de Ferreira	1–3	Boavista	Paços de Ferreira
18:00 WET (UTC)	Holsgrove (yellow card) 15'; Butzke 62'; Delgado (yellow card) 69'; Antunes (yellow card) 90+1'; Matchoi (yellow card) 90+7'	Report	Malheiro (yellow card) 14'; Abascal (yellow card) 16'; Njie 28' (yellow card) 90+1'; Mangas 47'; Gorré 57' (yellow card) 63'; Makouta (yellow card) 67'; Agra (yellow card) 89'; Cannon (yellow card) 90+1'	Stadium: Estádio da Mata Real; Attendance: 5,406; Referee: Manuel Oliveira

6 March 2023 23	Casa Pia	2–1	Paços de Ferreira	Lisbon
20:15 WET (UTC)	Soma (yellow card) 34'; Zolotić (yellow card) 39'; Maracás 67' (o.g.); Varela 76'; Batista (yellow card) 90+3'	Report	Bernardo 45+3' (yellow card) 55'; Holsgrove (yellow card) 68'	Stadium: Estádio Pina Manique; Attendance: 530; Referee: João Pinheiro

11 March 2023 24	Paços de Ferreira	1–0	Santa Clara	Paços de Ferreira
15:30 WET (UTC)	Pires (yellow card) 45+2'; Antunes 53' (pen.); Gaitán (yellow card) 59'; Marafona (yellow card) 65'; Thomas (yellow card) 73'; Maracás (yellow card) 80'	Report	Rildo (yellow card) 35'; Jordão (yellow card) 52'; Henrique (yellow card) 61'; MT (yellow card) 64'; Bobsin (yellow card) 71'; Allano (yellow card) 73'	Stadium: Estádio da Mata Real; Attendance: 3,635; Referee: António Nobre

18 March 2023 25	Arouca	1–1	Paços de Ferreira	Arouca
18:00 WET (UTC)	Antony (yellow card) 43'; Mújica 55'; Soro (yellow card) 73'; Esgaio (yellow card) 90+2'	Report	Maracás (yellow card) 38'; Gaitán 75'; Antunes (yellow card) 82'; Matchoi (yellow card) 90+1'	Stadium: Estádio Municipal; Attendance: 1,048; Referee: Vítor Ferreira

1 April 2023 26	Vitória de Guimarães	0–0	Paços de Ferreira	Guimarães
18:00 WEST (UTC+1)	Tiago Silva (yellow card) 40'; Safira (yellow card) 45+1'	Report	Pires (yellow card) 45+1'; Delgado (yellow card) 50'; Maracás (yellow card) 51'; Marafona (yellow card) 77' (red card) 77'	Stadium: Estádio D. Afonso Henriques; Attendance: 14,784; Referee: Gustavo Correia

8 April 2023 27	Paços de Ferreira	1–3	Famalicão	Paços de Ferreira
18:00 WET (UTC)	Hernâni 34'; Lima (yellow card) 50'; Bernardo (yellow card) 68'	Report	Cádiz 41'; Jaime 70', 87'	Stadium: Estádio da Mata Real; Attendance: 4,992; Referee: Rui Costa

15 April 2023 28	Marítimo	3–1	Paços de Ferreira	Funchal
15:30 WET (UTC)	Vidigal 29'; Riascos (yellow card) 35'; Val 42'; Afonso (yellow card) 52'; Vítor Costa 69'; Carné (yellow card) 61'; Paulinho (yellow card) 84'	Report	Gaitán (yellow card) 41'; Butzke 78'; Delgado (yellow card) 80'; Maracás (yellow card) 81'; Antunes (yellow card) 84'	Stadium: Estádio do Marítimo; Attendance: 9,093; Referee: Artur Soares Dias

22 April 2023 29	Paços de Ferreira	0–2	Porto	Paços de Ferreira
20:30 WET (UTC)	Lima (yellow card) 38'; Pires (yellow card) 40'; Holsgrove (yellow card) 45+1' (yellow-red card) 45+3'; Delgado (yellow card) 50'	Report	Taremi 65'; Marcano (yellow card) 68'; Martínez 83'	Stadium: Estádio da Mata Real; Attendance: 7,852; Referee: Fábio Veríssimo

29 April 2023 30	Vizela	1–2	Paços de Ferreira	Vizela
18:00 WET (UTC)	Kiki (yellow card) 9'; Lacava 77'; Fernandes (yellow card) 85'	Report	Gaitán 16'; Bernardo 33'; Carlos (yellow card) 77'; Ferigra (yellow card) 87'; Antunes (yellow card) 90+3'	Stadium: Estádio do FC Vizela; Attendance: 4,423; Referee: Claúdio Pereira

7 May 2023 31	Paços de Ferreira	0–4	Sporting CP	Paços de Ferreira
20:30 WET (UTC)	Delgado (yellow card) 57'	Report	Marafona 7' (o.g.); Santos 33'; Morita (yellow card) 39'; Trincão 61'; Chermiti 90+2'	Stadium: Estádio da Mata Real; Attendance: 4,791; Referee: Nuno Almeida

13 May 2023 32	Chaves	2–0	Paços de Ferreira	Chaves
15:30 WET (UTC)	Obiora 52'; Teixeira 79'	Report	Bernardo (yellow card) 33' (yellow-red card) 42'; Antunes (yellow card) 90+4'; Ribeiro (yellow card) 90+4'	Stadium: Municipal Eng. Manuel Branco Teixeira; Attendance: 2,475; Referee: João Pinheiro

21 May 2023 33	Paços de Ferreira	3–1	Rio Ave	Paços de Ferreira
18:00 WET (UTC)	Thomas 1'; Santos 48' (o.g.); Holsgrove (yellow card) 50'; Guedes 85'; Pires (yellow card) 90'; Ribeiro (yellow card) 90+6'	Report	William 3'; Pantalon (yellow card) 42'; Pereira (yellow card) 79'; Costinha (yellow card) 81'	Stadium: Estádio da Mata Real; Attendance: 2,032; Referee: Hélder Malheiro

28 May 2023 34	Braga	3–0	Paços de Ferreira	Braga
15:30 WET (UTC)	Djaló 8'; Horta 29'; Banza 51'	Report	Ribeiro (yellow card) 75'	Stadium: Estádio Municipal de Braga; Attendance: 14,481; Referee: Manuel Mota

=== Taça de Portugal ===
16 October 2022 Third Round	Vitória de Setúbal	2–0	Paços de Ferreira	Paços de Ferreira
20:30 WEST (UTC+1)	Santos (yellow card) 14'; Varela (yellow card) 35' (goal) 46'; Lima (yellow card) 47'; François 71'	Report	Toma (yellow card) 26'; Delgado (yellow card) 31'; Jordi (yellow card) 35'; Pires (yellow card) 37'; Matchoi (yellow card) 90+1'	Stadium: Estádio da Mata Real; Referee: Carlos Macedo

=== Taça da Liga ===
Pos	Team	Pld	W	D	L	GF	GA	GD	Pts	
1	Braga	3	3	0	0	6	0	+6	9	Advance to the quarter-finals
2	Casa Pia	3	1	1	1	2	2	0	4	
3	Paços de Ferreira	3	0	2	1	2	4	−2	2	
4	Trofense	3	0	1	2	1	5	−4	1	

Source: Soccerway

20 November 2022 Group Stage	Paços de Ferreira	1–1	Casa Pia	Paços de Ferreira
20:15 WET (UTC)	Antunes (penalty missed) 31' 40'; Luíz Carlos (yellow card) 33'; Koffi (yellow card) 89'	Report	Varela 47'	Stadium: Estádio da Mata Real; Attendance: 655; Referee: Cláudio Pereira

3 December 2022 Group Stage	Trofense	1–1	Paços de Ferreira	Trofa
20:45 WET (UTC)	I.Maïga 27'; Liberal (yellow card) 56'	Report	Ferigra (yellow card) 25' (yellow-red card) 53'; Valente 57' (o.g.); M.Couto (yellow card) 90+4'	Stadium: Estádio do CD Trofense; Attendance: 537; Referee: Gustavo Correia

11 December 2022 Group Stage	Braga	2–0	Paços de Ferreira	Braga
19:00 WET (UTC)	Ruiz (penalty missed) 34' 45+1'; Djaló 42'; Gómez (yellow card) 55'	Report	Holsgrove (yellow card) 37'; Pires (yellow card) 68'; Bastos (yellow card) 75'	Stadium: Estádio Municipal de Braga; Attendance: 4,998; Referee: Rui Costa

== Squad statistics ==
As of match played 27 May 2023

=== Appearances and goals ===
No.	Pos	Nat	Player	Total		Primeira Liga		Taça de Portugal		Taça da Liga	
No.	Pos	Nat	Player	Apps	Goals	Apps	Goals	Apps	Goals	Apps	Goals
3	DF	(Portugal) POR	Nuno Lima	31	1	27+1	1	0	0	3	0
4	DF	(Portugal) POR	Pedro Ganchas	6	0	2+3	0	0	0	1	0
5	DF	(Portugal) POR	Vitorino Antunes	35	2	32	1	0	0	2+1	1
6	MF	(Scotland) SCO	Jordan Holsgrove	27	2	21+3	2	0	0	2+1	0
7	FW	(Netherlands) NED	Nigel Thomas	37	4	23+10	4	0+1	0	2+1	0
9	FW	(Brazil) BRA	Zé Uilton	32	1	15+14	1	1	0	2	0
10	MF	(Argentina) ARG	Nicolás Gaitán	28	3	24+2	3	0	0	2	0
11	FW	(Brazil) BRA	Fábio Gomes	9	0	1+8	0	0	0	0	0
15	MF	(Chile) CHI	Juan Delgado	34	0	31	0	1	0	1+1	0
16	MF	(Portugal) POR	Matchoi Djaló	24	1	14+8	1	1	0	1	0
17	FW	(Spain) ESP	Adrián Butzke	29	6	13+12	6	1	0	2+1	0
18	MF	(Portugal) POR	Tiago Ribeiro	5	0	1+4	0	0	0	0	0
20	DF	(Portugal) POR	Luís Bastos	10	0	4+4	0	1	0	1	0
21	DF	(Portugal) POR	Jorge Silva	20	0	3+14	0	0	0	3	0
22	MF	(Brazil) BRA	Luíz Carlos	22	0	13+7	0	0	0	1+1	0
23	DF	(Ecuador) ECU	Erick Ferigra	17	0	11+4	0	0	0	2	0
24	GK	(Portugal) POR	José Oliveira	4	0	3	0	0	0	1	0
25	DF	(Brazil) BRA	Maracás	17	0	17	0	0	0	0	0
26	MF	(Portugal) POR	Rui Pires	33	0	30+1	0	1	0	1	0
27	DF	(Portugal) POR	João Vigário	1	0	0+1	0	0	0	0	0
28	GK	(Portugal) POR	José Marafona	16	0	16	0	0	0	0	0
30	FW	(Portugal) POR	Alexandre Guedes	16	1	10+6	1	0	0	0	0
32	DF	(Brazil) BRA	Flávio Ramos	9	0	9	0	0	0	0	0
33	DF	(Portugal) POR	Vasco Sousa	1	0	0	0	1	0	0	0
41	FW	(Portugal) POR	Mauro Couto	8	0	1+4	0	0	0	0+3	0
55	MF	(Portugal) POR	Paulo Bernardo	13	2	9+4	2	0	0	0	0
70	MF	(Guinea-Bissau) GBS	Hernâni Infande	10	1	4+6	1	0	0	0	0
98	GK	(Slovenia) SLO	Igor Vekić	11	0	10+1	0	0	0	0	0
Players away on loan:
Players who appeared for Paços de Ferreira but left during the season:
1	GK	(Brazil) BRA	Jordi	9	0	6	0	1	0	2	0
8	MF	(Nigeria) NGR	Abbas Ibrahim	9	0	3+4	0	0	0	2	0
11	FW	(Brazil) BRA	Kayky	9	0	4+4	0	0+1	0	0	0
13	FW	(Brazil) BRA	Arthur Sales	14	0	3+8	0	0+1	0	1+1	0
14	MF	(Switzerland) SUI	Bastien Toma	17	0	4+9	0	1	0	1+2	0
19	FW	(Ivory Coast) CIV	N'Dri Koffi	15	2	7+5	2	0+1	0	0+2	0
23	FW	(Brazil) BRA	Lucas Silva	1	0	0+1	0	0	0	0	0
29	DF	(Portugal) POR	Fernando Fonseca	7	0	2+4	0	1	0	0	0
34	DF	(Portugal) POR	Tiago Ilori	4	0	3	0	1	0	0	0

=== Goal scorers ===
Place	Position	Nation	Number	Name	Primeira Liga	Taça de Portugal	Taça da Liga	Total
1	FW	(Spain)	17	Adrián Butzke	6	0	0	6
2	FW	(Netherlands)	7	Nigel Thomas	4	0	0	4
3	MF	(Argentina)	10	Nicolás Gaitán	3	0	0	3
4	FW	(Ivory Coast)	19	N'Dri Koffi	2	0	0	2
4	MF	(Scotland)	6	Jordan Holsgrove	2	0	0	2
4	MF	(Portugal)	55	Paulo Bernardo	2	0	0	2
4	DF	(Portugal)	5	Vitorino Antunes	1	0	1	2
4				Own goal	1	0	1	2
9	MF	(Portugal)	16	Matchoi Djaló	1	0	0	1
9	FW	(Brazil)	9	Zé Uilton	1	0	0	1
9	DF	(Portugal)	3	Nuno Lima	1	0	0	1
9	MF	(Guinea-Bissau)	70	Hernâni Infande	1	0	0	1
9	FW	(Portugal)	30	Alexandre Guedes	1	0	0	1
Total					26	0	2	28

=== Clean sheets ===
Place	Position	Nation	Number	Name	Primeira Liga	Taça de Portugal	Taça da Liga	Total
1	GK	(Portugal)	28	José Marafona	2	0	0	2
TOTALS					2	0	0	2

=== Disciplinary record ===
Number	Nation	Position	Name	Primeira Liga		Taça de Portugal		Taça da Liga		Total	
Number	Nation	Position	Name	Yellow card	Red card	Yellow card	Red card	Yellow card	Red card	Yellow card	Red card
3	(Portugal)	DF	Nuno Lima	7	1	0	0	0	0	7	1
5	(Portugal)	DF	Vitorino Antunes	12	1	0	0	0	0	12	1
6	(Scotland)	MF	Jordan Holsgrove	11	1	0	0	1	0	12	1
7	(Netherlands)	FW	Nigel Thomas	3	0	0	0	0	0	3	0
9	(Brazil)	FW	Zé Uilton	4	1	0	0	0	0	4	1
10	(Argentina)	MF	Nicolás Gaitán	3	0	0	0	0	0	3	0
15	(Chile)	MF	Juan Delgado	12	0	1	0	0	0	13	0
16	(Portugal)	MF	Matchoi Djaló	11	1	1	0	0	0	12	1
17	(Spain)	MF	Adrián Butzke	3	1	0	0	0	0	3	1
18	(Portugal)	MF	Tiago Ribeiro	3	0	0	0	0	0	3	0
20	(Portugal)	DF	Luís Bastos	0	0	0	0	1	0	1	0
22	(Brazil)	MF	Luíz Carlos	4	0	0	0	1	0	5	0
23	(Ecuador)	DF	Erick Ferigra	3	0	0	0	2	1	5	1
24	(Portugal)	GK	José Oliveira	1	0	0	0	0	0	1	0
25	(Brazil)	DF	Maracás	7	2	0	0	0	0	7	2
26	(Portugal)	MF	Rui Pires	10	0	1	0	1	0	12	0
28	(Portugal)	GK	José Marafona	5	1	0	0	0	0	5	1
32	(Brazil)	DF	Flávio Ramos	1	0	0	0	0	0	1	0
41	(Portugal)	FW	Mauro Couto	0	0	0	0	1	0	1	0
55	(Portugal)	MF	Paulo Bernardo	4	1	0	0	0	0	4	1
Players away on loan:
Players who left Paços de Ferreira during the season:
1	(Brazil)	GK	Jordi	1	0	1	0	0	0	2	0
8	(Nigeria)	MF	Abbas Ibrahim	3	0	0	0	0	0	3	0
11	(Brazil)	FW	Kayky	1	0	0	0	0	0	1	0
14	(Switzerland)	MF	Bastien Toma	1	0	1	0	0	0	2	0
19	(Ivory Coast)	FW	N'Dri Koffi	0	0	0	0	1	0	1	0
Total				109	10	5	0	8	1	122	11
