= 2021–22 F.C. Paços de Ferreira season =

F.C. Paços de Ferreira
2021–22 season
- Chairman: Paulo Meneses
- Manager: Jorge Simão
- Stadium: Estádio da Mata Real
- Primeira Liga: 11th
- Taça de Portugal: Fourth round
- Taça da Liga: Third round
- UEFA Europa Conference League: Play-off round
| Home colours | Away colours | Third colours |

The 2021–22 season is the 72nd season in the existence of F.C. Paços de Ferreira and the club's third consecutive season in the top flight of Portuguese football. In addition to the domestic league, Paços de Ferreira will participate in this season's edition of the Taça de Portugal, Taça da Liga, and the Europa Conference League.

== Players ==
=== First-team squad ===
As of 17 February 2022

Note: Flags indicate national team as defined under FIFA eligibility rules; some limited exceptions apply. Players may hold more than one non-FIFA nationality.

| No. | Pos. | Nation | Player |
|---|---|---|---|
| 1 | GK | BRA | Jordi |
| 2 | DF | POR | Marco Baixinho |
| 3 | DF | POR | Nuno Lima |
| 4 | DF | POR | Pedro Ganchas |
| 5 | DF | POR | Vitorino Antunes |
| 6 | DF | BRA | Maracás |
| 7 | FW | POR | Hélder Ferreira |
| 8 | MF | NGR | Abbas Ibrahim |
| 9 | FW | BRA | Zé Uilton |
| 10 | FW | BRA | Denílson |
| 11 | FW | CIV | N'Dri Koffi (on loan from Reims) |
| 12 | GK | BRA | Jeimes |
| 13 | GK | POR | André Ferreira |
| 15 | MF | CHI | Juan Delgado |
| 16 | MF | POR | Matchoi Djaló |

| No. | Pos. | Nation | Player |
|---|---|---|---|
| 17 | FW | ESP | Adrián Butzke (on loan from Granada) |
| 20 | DF | POR | Luís Bastos |
| 21 | DF | POR | Jorge Silva |
| 22 | MF | BRA | Luíz Carlos |
| 23 | FW | BRA | Lucas Silva |
| 24 | MF | FRA | Mohamed Diaby |
| 26 | MF | POR | Rui Pires (on loan from Troyes) |
| 27 | DF | POR | João Vigário |
| 29 | DF | POR | Fernando Fonseca |
| 32 | DF | BRA | Flávio Ramos |
| 77 | MF | POR | Nuno Santos (on loan from Benfica) |
| 98 | GK | SLO | Igor Vekić (on loan from Bravo) |
| — | MF | FRA | Noa Cervantes (on loan from Reims) |
| — | MF | ARG | Nicolás Gaitán |

=== Out on loan ===
Note: Flags indicate national team as defined under FIFA eligibility rules; some limited exceptions apply. Players may hold more than one non-FIFA nationality.

| No. | Pos. | Nation | Player |
|---|---|---|---|
| — | GK | POR | José Oliveira (to Sanjoanense until 30 June 2022) |
| — | DF | POR | Adriano Castanheira (to Chaves until 30 June 2022) |
| — | DF | POR | David Sualehe (to Académica until 30 June 2022) |
| — | DF | POR | Simão Rocha (to SC União Torreense until 30 June 2022) |

| No. | Pos. | Nation | Player |
|---|---|---|---|
| — | MF | CAN | Stephen Eustáquio (to Porto until 30 June 2022) |
| — | FW | AUS | Samuel Silvera (to Newcastle Jets until 30 June 2022) |
| — | FW | ISR | Dor Jan (to Maccabi Petah Tikva until 30 June 2022) |
| — | FW | POR | Pedro Martelo (to Amora until 30 June 2022) |

== Pre-season and friendlies ==
Win Draw Loss Fixtures

| 24 July 2021 Friendly | Braga (Portugal) | 2–1 | (Portugal) Paços de Ferreira | Braga, Portugal |
| 20:00 WEST (UTC+1) | Ruiz 53'; González 86' | Report | Silva 58' | Stadium: Estádio Municipal de Braga |

== Competitions ==
=== Overall record ===
| Competition | First match | Last match | Starting round | Final position | Record | | | | | | | |
| Competition | First match | Last match | Starting round | Final position | Pld | W | D | L | GF | GA | GD | Win % |
|---|---|---|---|---|---|---|---|---|---|---|---|---|
| Primeira Liga | 8 August 2021 | 13 May 2022 | Matchday 1 | 11th | 34 | 9 | 11 | 14 | 29 | 44 | −15 | 26.47 |
| Taça de Portugal | 17 October 2021 | 19 November 2021 | Third round | Fourth round | 2 | 1 | 0 | 1 | 4 | 4 | +0 | 50.00 |
| Taça da Liga | 30 July 2021 | 28 October 2021 | Second round | Third round | 3 | 0 | 2 | 1 | 2 | 3 | −1 | 0.00 |
| UEFA Europa Conference League | 5 August 2021 | 26 August 2021 | Third qualifying round | Play-off round | 4 | 2 | 0 | 2 | 5 | 4 | +1 | 50.00 |
| Total | | | | | 43 | 12 | 13 | 18 | 40 | 55 | −15 | 27.91 |

Source: Soccerway

=== Primeira Liga ===
==== League table ====
| Pos | Team | Pld | W | D | L | GF | GA | GD | Pts |
|---|---|---|---|---|---|---|---|---|---|
| 9 | Estoril | 34 | 9 | 12 | 13 | 36 | 43 | −7 | 39 (Note: Head-to-head points: Famalicão 4, Estoril 1.) |
| 10 | Marítimo | 34 | 9 | 11 | 14 | 39 | 44 | −5 | 38 (Note: Head-to-head points: Marítimo 10, Paços de Ferreira 8, Boavista 7, Portimonense 6.) |
| 11 | Paços de Ferreira | 34 | 9 | 11 | 14 | 29 | 44 | −15 | 38 |
| 12 | Boavista | 34 | 7 | 17 | 10 | 39 | 52 | −13 | 38 |
| 13 | Portimonense | 34 | 10 | 8 | 16 | 31 | 45 | −14 | 38 |

Source: Liga Portugal
Rules for classification: 1) Points; 2) Head-to-head points; 3) Head-to-head goal difference; 4) Head-to-head away goals scored; 5) Goal difference; 6) Matches won; 7) Goals scored; 8) Play-off.

==== Results summary ====
| Overall | | | | | | | | Home | | | | | | Away | | | | | |
| Pld | W | D | L | GF | GA | GD | Pts | W | D | L | GF | GA | GD | W | D | L | GF | GA | GD |
|---|---|---|---|---|---|---|---|---|---|---|---|---|---|---|---|---|---|---|---|
| 0 | 0 | 0 | 0 | 0 | 0 | 0 | 0 | 0 | 0 | 0 | 0 | 0 | 0 | 0 | 0 | 0 | 0 | 0 | 0 |

Last updated: August 2021.
Source: Liga Portugal

==== Results by round ====
| Round | 1 |
|---|---|
| Ground | |
| Result | |
| Position | |

Updated to match(es) played on August 2021. Source: Liga Portugal
A = Away; H = Home; W = Win; D = Draw; L = Loss

==== Matches ====
| 8 August 2021 1 | Paços de Ferreira | 2–0 | Famalicão |

| 16 August 2021 2 | Boavista | 3–0 | Paços de Ferreira |

| 23 August 2021 3 | Paços de Ferreira | 1–3 | Estoril |

| 29 August 2021 4 | Portimonense | 0–1 | Paços de Ferreira |

| 11 September 2021 5 | Paços de Ferreira | 0–0 | Braga |

| 19 September 2021 6 | Vizela | 1–1 | Paços de Ferreira |

| 27 September 2021 7 | Paços de Ferreira | 2–2 | Belenenses |

| 2 October 2021 8 | Porto | 2–1 | Paços de Ferreira |

| 24 October 2021 9 | Paços de Ferreira | 0–0 | Arouca |

| 1 November 2021 10 | Moreirense | 1–1 | Paços de Ferreira |

| 7 November 2021 11 | Paços de Ferreira | 0–2 | Sporting CP |

| 28 November 2021 12 | Marítimo | 2–0 | Paços de Ferreira |

| 4 December 2021 13 | Paços de Ferreira | 1–2 | Vitória de Guimarães |

| 10 December 2021 14 | Paços de Ferreira | 0–1 | Gil Vicente |

| 18 December 2021 15 | Tondela | 0–1 | Paços de Ferreira |

| 30 December 2021 16 | Paços de Ferreira | 2–1 | Santa Clara |

| 9 January 2022 17 | Benfica | 2–0 | Paços de Ferreira |

| 16 January 2022 18 | Famalicão | 0–0 | Paços de Ferreira |

| 21 January 2022 19 | Paços de Ferreira | 1–1 | Boavista |

| 31 January 2022 20 | Estoril | 0–0 | Paços de Ferreira |

| 5 February 2022 21 | Paços de Ferreira | 1–1 | Portimonense |

| 12 February 2022 22 | Braga | 2–1 | Paços de Ferreira |

| 19 February 2022 23 | Paços de Ferreira | 2–1 | Vizela |

| 25 February 2022 24 | Belenenses | 0–2 | Paços de Ferreira |

| 6 March 2022 25 | Paços de Ferreira | 2–4 | Porto |

| 12 March 2022 26 | Arouca | 0–1 | Paços de Ferreira |

| 20 March 2022 27 | Paços de Ferreira | 2–1 | Moreirense |

| 3 April 2022 28 | Sporting CP | 2–0 | Paços de Ferreira |

| 9 April 2022 29 | Paços de Ferreira | 2–0 | Marítimo |

| 15 April 2022 30 | Vitória de Guimarães | 4–0 | Paços de Ferreira |

| 23 April 2022 31 | Gil Vicente | 1–1 | Paços de Ferreira |

| 2 May 2022 32 | Paços de Ferreira | 1–1 | Tondela |

| 8 May 2022 33 | Santa Clara | 2–0 | Paços de Ferreira |

| 13 May 2022 34 | Paços de Ferreira | 0–2 | Benfica |

=== Taça da Liga ===
| 30 July 2021 Second round | Paços de Ferreira | 1–1 (4–3 p) | Gil Vicente F.C. | Paços de Ferreira |
| 20:15 WEST (UTC+1) | Denílson 47' | Report | Bilel Aouacheria 58' | Stadium: Estádio Capital do Móvel; Attendance: 0 Referee: Rui Costa |
| | Penalties |
| | Douglas Tanque (penalty scored); Uilton (penalty scored); João Pedro (penalty missed); Juan Delgado (penalty scored); Maracás (penalty scored) | | (penalty scored) Talocha; (penalty missed) Paulinho Mota; (penalty missed) Pedrinho; (penalty scored) Rúben Fernandes; (penalty scored) Kanya Fujimoto |

=== UEFA Europa Conference League ===
==== Third qualifying round ====
The draw for the third qualifying round was held on 19 July 2021.

| 5 August 2021 First leg | Paços de Ferreira (Portugal) | 4–0 | (Northern Ireland) Larne | Paços de Ferreira, Portugal |
| 19:00 WEST (UTC+1) | Denílson 44', 70'; Eustáquio 73'; Lucas Silva 90' | Report | | Stadium: Estádio da Mata Real; Attendance: 1,577; Referee: Matej Jug (Slovenia) |

| 12 August 2021 Second leg | Larne (Northern Ireland) | 1–0 (1–4 agg.) | (Portugal) Paços de Ferreira | Larne, Northern Ireland |
| 19:30 BST (UTC+1) | Randall 83' | Report | | Stadium: Inver Park; Attendance: 1,150; Referee: Fran Jović (Croatia) |

==== Play-off round ====
The draw for the play-off round was held on 2 August 2021.

| 19 August 2021 First leg | Paços de Ferreira (Portugal) | 1–0 | (England) Tottenham Hotspur | Paços de Ferreira, Portugal |
| 20:30 CEST (UTC+2) | Ferreira (yellow card) 35'; Silva 45'; Antunes (yellow card) 66'; Delgado (yellow card) 74' | Report | Davies (yellow card) 31'; Gil (yellow card) 90' | Stadium: Estádio da Mata Real; Attendance: 2,284; Referee: Maurizio Mariani (Italy) |

| 26 August 2021 Second leg | Tottenham Hotspur (England) | 3–0 (3–1 agg.) | (Portugal) Paços de Ferreira | Tottenham, England |
| 19:45 BST (UTC+1) | Kane 9', 35'; Romero (yellow card) 30'; Gil (yellow card) 63'; Lo Celso 70' | Report | Denílson (yellow card) 41'; Antunes (yellow card) 50'; Pires (yellow card) 64' | Stadium: Tottenham Hotspur Stadium; Attendance: 30,215; Referee: Ruddy Buquet (France) |
