= 2020–21 F.C. Paços de Ferreira season =

Paços de Ferreira
2020–21 season
- Chairman: Paulo Meneses
- Manager: Pepa
- Stadium: Estádio da Mata Real
- Primeira Liga: 5th
- Taça de Portugal: Fifth round
- Taça da Liga: Quarter-finals
- Top goalscorer: League: Douglas Tanque (9); All: Douglas Tanque (11)
Home colours	Away colours	Third colours

The 2020–21 F.C. Paços de Ferreira season was F.C. Paços de Ferreira's second consecutive season in top-division of the Portuguese football league, the Primeira Liga, and the 70th as a football club.

== Players ==
=== First-team squad ===
As of 31 January 2021

Note: Flags indicate national team as defined under FIFA eligibility rules; some limited exceptions apply. Players may hold more than one non-FIFA nationality.

No.	Pos.	Nation	Player
1	GK	BRA	Jordi
2	DF	POR	Marco Baixinho
6	MF	ESP	Martín Calderón (on loan from Real Madrid)
7	FW	POR	Hélder Ferreira
8	MF	NGR	Abbas Ibrahim
9	FW	BRA	Zé Uilton
10	MF	POR	Bruno Costa (on loan from Portimonense)
11	FW	RSA	Luther Singh (on loan from Braga)
12	GK	POR	José Oliveira
16	MF	POR	Matchoi Djaló
17	FW	POR	Adriano Castanheira
18	FW	ISR	Dor Jan
19	FW	POR	Pedro Martelo
20	DF	POR	David Sualehe

No.	Pos.	Nation	Player
21	DF	POR	Jorge Silva
22	MF	BRA	Luíz Carlos
23	FW	BRA	Lucas Silva
24	MF	FRA	Mohamed Diaby
25	MF	POR	Bernardo Martins
26	DF	BRA	Maracás
29	DF	POR	Fernando Fonseca
31	GK	BRA	Michael Fracaro
34	DF	POR	Pedro Marques
44	DF	BRA	Marcelo
45	FW	POR	João Pedro
46	MF	CAN	Stephen Eustáquio
77	FW	POR	João Amaral
99	FW	BRA	Douglas Tanque
—	DF	POR	Pedro Rebocho

=== Out on loan ===
Note: Flags indicate national team as defined under FIFA eligibility rules; some limited exceptions apply. Players may hold more than one non-FIFA nationality.

No.	Pos.	Nation	Player
—	FW	BRA	Getúlio (at Avaí)
—	MF	BRA	Rafael Gava (at Cuiabá)
—	FW	AUS	Samuel Silvera (at Casa Pia)

== Pre-season and friendlies ==
Win Draw Loss

2 September 2020 Friendly	Paços de Ferreira (Portugal)	1–2	(Portugal) Rio Ave	Paços de Ferreira
10:30 WEST (UTC+1)				Stadium: Estádio da Mata Real

5 September 2020 Friendly	Leeds United (England)	3–1	(Portugal) Paços de Ferreira	Thorp Arch
20:15 BST (UTC+1)				Stadium: Thorp Arch; Attendance: 0

== Competitions ==
=== Overview ===
Competition	First match	Last match	Starting round	Final position	Record							
Competition	First match	Last match	Starting round	Final position	Pld	W	D	L	GF	GA	GD	Win %
Primeira Liga	21 September 2020	18 May 2021	Matchday 1	5th	34	15	8	11	40	41	−1	44.12
Taça de Portugal	22 November 2020	11 December 2020	Third round	Fifth round	2	1	0	1	4	3	+1	50.00
Taça da Liga	16 December 2020		Quarter-finals	Quarter-finals	1	0	0	1	1	2	−1	0.00
Total					37	16	8	13	45	46	−1	43.24

Source: Soccerway

=== Primeira Liga ===
==== League table ====
Pos	Team	Pld	W	D	L	GF	GA	GD	Pts	Qualification or relegation
3	Benfica	34	23	7	4	69	27	+42	76	Qualification for the Champions League third qualifying round
4	Braga	34	19	7	8	53	33	+20	64	Qualification for the Europa League group stage (Note: Braga qualified for the Europa League group stage by winning the 2020–21 Taça de Portugal. Since they would have qualified for the Europa Conference League third qualifying round by finishing fourth, the berth was awarded to the fifth-placed team (Paços de Ferreira), and the Europa Conference League second qualifying round berth reserved to the fifth-placed team was awarded to the sixth-placed team (Santa Clara).)
5	Paços de Ferreira	34	15	8	11	40	41	−1	53	Qualification for the Europa Conference League third qualifying round
6	Santa Clara	34	13	7	14	44	36	+8	46	Qualification for the Europa Conference League second qualifying round
7	Vitória de Guimarães	34	12	7	15	37	44	−7	43 (Note: Vitória de Guimarães are ranked ahead of Moreirense on head-to-head points: Vitória de Guimarães 4, Moreirense 1.)	

Source: Liga Portugal
Rules for classification: 1) Points; 2) Head-to-head points; 3) Head-to-head goal difference; 4) Head-to-head away goals scored; 5) Goal difference; 6) Matches won; 7) Goals scored; 8) Play-off.

==== Results summary ====
Overall								Home						Away					
Pld	W	D	L	GF	GA	GD	Pts	W	D	L	GF	GA	GD	W	D	L	GF	GA	GD
34	15	8	11	40	41	−1	53	10	3	4	23	19	+4	5	5	7	17	22	−5

Source: Liga Portugal

==== Results by round ====
Round	1	2	3	4	5	6	7	8	9	10	11	12	13	14	15	16	17	18	19	20	21	22	23	24	25	26	27	28	29	30	31	32	33	34
Ground	A	H	A	H	A	H	A	H	A	H	A	H	A	H	A	A	H	H	A	H	A	H	A	H	A	H	A	H	A	H	A	H	H	A
Result	D	L	L	W	D	W	W	W	L	D	D	W	W	W	W	W	W	D	L	W	L	W	L	W	L	L	L	L	D	W	D	D	L	W
Position	7	15	15	13	13	8	5	5	6	6	6	6	6	5	5	5	5	5	5	5	5	5	5	5	5	5	5	5	5	5	5	5	5	5

Source: Liga Portugal
A = Away; H = Home; W = Win; D = Draw; L = Loss

==== Matches ====
The league fixtures were announced on 28 August 2020.

21 September 2020 1	Portimonense	1–1	Paços de Ferreira	Portimão
19:45 WEST (UTC+1)	Fabrício 52'; Maurício (yellow card) 90+8'	Report	Lucas 45+1' (o.g.); Singh (yellow card) 52'	Stadium: Estádio Municipal de Portimão; Attendance: 0 (Note: The match was played behind closed doors due to the COVID-19 pandemic in Portugal.); Referee: Iancu Vasilica

27 September 2020 2	Paços de Ferreira	0–2	Sporting CP	Paços de Ferreira
18:30 WEST (UTC+1)	Douglas (yellow card) 21'; Eustáquio (yellow card) 74'	Report	Neto (yellow card) 10'; Cabral 23' (pen.), (yellow card) 25'; Wendel (yellow card) 36'; Adán (yellow card) 45+3'; Coates 63'; Nunes (yellow card) 80'; Feddal (yellow card) 84'	Stadium: Estádio da Mata Real; Attendance: 0 Referee: Fábio Veríssimo

2 October 2020 3	Vitória de Guimarães	1–0	Paços de Ferreira	Guimarães
21:15 WEST (UTC+1)	Suliman (yellow card) 75'; Sílvio (yellow card) 79'; André André 82'; Bruno (yellow card) 87'; Varela (yellow card) 90+1'	Report	Marcelo (yellow card) 67'; Baixinho (yellow card) 90+4'	Stadium: Estádio D. Afonso Henriques; Attendance: 0 Referee: Helder Malheiro

18 October 2020 4	Paços de Ferreira	2–1	Santa Clara	Paços de Ferreira
15:00 WEST (UTC+1)	Reabciuk 34', (yellow card) 68'; Douglas 71'; Diaby (yellow card) 83'	Report	F. Cardoso (yellow card) 50'; Santana 68', (yellow card) 79'	Stadium: Estádio da Mata Real; Attendance: 0 Referee: Vítor Ferreira

24 October 2020 5	Nacional	1–1	Paços de Ferreira	Madeira
15:30 WEST (UTC+1)	Pedrão (yellow card) 7'; Gorré (yellow card) 21'; Riascos 57'; Witi (yellow card) 90+8', (red card) 90+8'	Report	Amaral (yellow card) 26'; Eustáquio 76'	Stadium: Estádio da Madeira; Attendance: 0 Referee: Hugo Silva

30 October 2020 6	Paços de Ferreira	3–2	Porto	Paços de Ferreira
20:30 WET (UTC±0)	Jan 11'; Eustáquio 43'; Costa 59' (pen.); Pedro (yellow card) 83'	Report	Oliveira 45+7' (pen.), (yellow card) 84'; Otávio 78'	Stadium: Estádio da Mata Real; Attendance: 0 Referee: Nuno Almeida

1 December 2020 7	Moreirense	0–1	Paços de Ferreira	Braga
21:45 WET (UTC±0)	Franco (yellow card) 51'	Report	Tanque 10'	Stadium: Parque de Jogos Comendador Joaquim de Almeida Freitas; Attendance: 0 Referee: Hélder Malheiro

27 November 2020 8	Paços de Ferreira	2–0	Famalicão	Paços de Ferreira
19:00 WET (UTC±0)	Singh 20'; Costa (yellow card) 22'; Douglas (yellow card) 33'; Ferreira (yellow card) 70'; Reabciuk (yellow card) 80'; Uilton 89'	Report	Babić (yellow card) 17'; Verdonk (yellow card) 70'; Jordão (yellow card) 83'; Gustavo Assunção (yellow card) 90+3'	Stadium: Estádio da Mata Real; Attendance: 0 Referee: João Bento

6 December 2020 9	Benfica	2–1	Paços de Ferreira	Lisbon
20:00 WET (UTC±0)	Silva 58'; Otamendi (yellow card) 74'; Waldschmidt 90+4'	Report	Reabciuk 23'; Eustáquio (yellow card) 66'; Jordi (yellow card) 72'; Zé Uilton (yellow card) 78'	Stadium: Estádio da Luz; Attendance: 0 Referee: Rui Costa

20 December 2020 10	Paços de Ferreira	1–1	Boavista	Paços de Ferreira
15:00 WET (UTC±0)	Douglas (yellow card) 40'; João Pedro 83'	Report	Hamache (yellow card) 38'; Elis (yellow card) 45+1' (goal) 61'; Javi García (yellow card) 52'	Stadium: Estádio da Mata Real; Attendance: 0 Referee: Tiago Martins

27 December 2020 11	Farense	1–1	Paços de Ferreira	Faro
17:30 WET (UTC±0)	Falcão (yellow card) 54'; Gauld (yellow card) 68', (goal) 74'; Oudrhiri (yellow card) 87'	Report	Marcelo (yellow card) 45+1'; Douglas 59', (yellow card) 90+2'; Eustáquio (yellow card) 66'; Diaby (yellow card) 81'; Maracás (yellow card) 90'; Fernando (yellow card) 90+4'	Stadium: Estádio de São Luís; Attendance: 0 Referee: Luís Godinho

3 January 2021 12	Paços de Ferreira	2–0	Rio Ave	Paços de Ferreira
19:00 WET (UTC±0)	Douglas 24', 56'	Report		Stadium: Estádio da Mata Real; Attendance: 0 Referee: Hugo Miguel

10 January 2021 13	Belenenses SAD	0–2	Paços de Ferreira	Lisbon
20:00 WET (UTC±0)	Ramires (yellow card) 85'; Cardoso (yellow card) 88'	Report	Costa 12'; Eustáquito (yellow card) 85'; Pedro (yellow card) 86'; Diaby 90+1'	Stadium: Estádio Nacional; Attendance: 0 Referee: João Pinheiro

16 January 2021 14	Paços de Ferreira	2–0	Braga	Paços de Ferreira
15:30 WET (UTC±0)	Costa 57'; Ferreira 76'; Diaby (yellow card) 90'	Report	Galeno (yellow card) 62'; Medeiros (yellow card) 85'	Stadium: Estádio da Mata Real; Attendance: 0 Referee: Nuno Almeida

24 January 2021 15	Marítimo	0–3	Paços de Ferreira	Funchal
15:00 WET (UTC±0)	Lucas Áfrico (yellow card) 37'; Bambock (yellow card) 39'	Report	Costa 28'; Fernando (yellow card) 43'; Luíz Carlos 48'; Ferreira (yellow card) 61'; Singh (yellow card) 77', (goal) 85'	Stadium: Estádio do Marítimo; Attendance: 0 Referee: Vítor Ferreira

2 February 2021 16	Gil Vicente	1–2	Paços de Ferreira	Barcelos
20:15 WET (UTC±0)	Baraye (yellow card) 19'; Lourency (yellow card) 52'; Talocha (yellow card) 79'; Abbas 88'	Report	Amaral 15'; Singh (yellow card) 30'; Luíz Carlos 35'; Fernando (yellow card) 64'; Rebocho (yellow card) 75'; Eustáquio (yellow card) 90+3'; Ferreira (yellow card) 90+6'	Stadium: Estádio Cidade de Barcelos; Attendance: 0 Referee: Fábio Melo

5 February 2021 17	Paços de Ferreira	2–1	Tondela	Paços de Ferreira
21:00 WET (UTC±0)	Douglas 2'; Uilton (yellow card) 59'; Rebocho (yellow card) 64'; Pedro 85'	Report	Jaume (yellow card) 48'; Pedro 65'	Stadium: Estádio da Mata Real; Attendance: 0 Referee: João Pinheiro

9 February 2021 18	Paços de Ferreira	0–0	Portimonense	Paços de Ferreira
15:00 WET (UTC±0)	Diaby (yellow card) 13'; Singh (yellow card) 31'	Report	Ewerton (yellow card) 22'	Stadium: Estádio da Mata Real; Attendance: 0 Referee: Manuel Mota

15 February 2021 19	Sporting CP	2–0	Paços de Ferreira	Lisbon
20:15 WET (UTC±0)	Mendes (yellow card) 8'; Feddal (yellow card) 14'; João Mário 20' (pen.); Palhinha 48'; Porro (yellow card) 54'; Adán (yellow card) 75'; Cabral (yellow card) 88'	Report	Baixinho (yellow card) 13'; Rebocho (yellow card) 19'; Douglas (yellow card) 22'	Stadium: Estádio José Alvalade; Attendance: 0 Referee: André Narciso

21 February 2021 20	Paços de Ferreira	2–1	Vitória de Guimarães	Paços de Ferreira
15:00 WET (UTC±0)	Pedro 32'; Ferreira 62'	Report	Estupiñán 23'; Sacko (yellow card) 70'; Pepelu (yellow card) 82'	Stadium: Estádio da Mata Real; Attendance: 0 Referee: Nuno Almeida

27 February 2021 21	Santa Clara	3–0	Paços de Ferreira	Ponta Delgada
17:00 WET (UTC±0)	Allano 10', (yellow card) 49'; Crysan 45'; Carlos 56'	Report		Stadium: Estádio de São Miguel; Attendance: 0 Referee: Manuel Mota

5 March 2021 22	Paços de Ferreira	2–1	Nacional	Paços de Ferreira
18:30 WET (UTC±0)				Stadium: Estádio da Mata Real; Attendance: 0

14 March 2021 23	Porto	2–0	Paços de Ferreira	Porto
20:00 WET (UTC±0)	Pepe 77'; Oliveira 78'; Conceição (yellow card) 90'	Report	Maracás (yellow card) 62'; Costa (yellow card) 70'	Stadium: Estádio do Dragão; Attendance: 0 Referee: Tiago Martins

20 March 2021 24	Paços de Ferreira	3–0	Moreirense	Paços de Ferreira
15:30 WET (UTC±0)	Douglas Tanque 12' (pen.) (yellow card) 18'; Singh 20' (yellow card) 76'; Hélder Ferreira 44'; Luíz Carlos (yellow card) 48'; Fernando Fonseca (yellow card) 73'	Report	Ferraresi (yellow card) 11'	Stadium: Estádio da Mata Real; Attendance: 0 Referee: João Carlos Antunes Pereira Bento

4 April 2021 25	Famalicão	2–0	Paços de Ferreira	Vila Nova de Famalicão
20:00 WET (UTC±0)	Anderson Silva 41'; Iván Jaime 64'; Valenzuela (yellow card) 77'; Riccieli (yellow card) 90+5'	Report	Maracás (yellow card) 50'; Hélder Ferreira (yellow card) 79'; Bruno Costa (yellow card) 84'; Eustáquio (yellow card) 90+3'; Douglas Tanque (yellow card) 90+8' (red card) 90+8'	Stadium: Estádio Municipal 22 de Junho; Attendance: 0 Referee: Nuno Miguel Serrano Almeida

10 April 2021 26	Paços de Ferreira	0–5	Benfica	Paços de Ferreira
20:30 WET (UTC±0)	Eustáquio (red card) 22'; Bruno Costa (yellow card) 57'	Report	Diogo Gonçalves (yellow card) 28' (goal) 38'; Lucas Veríssimo (yellow card) 33'; Álex Grimaldo (yellow card) 44'; Rafa Silva 45'; Seferovic 45+8' (yellow card) 61' (goal) 78'; Waldschmidt (yellow card) 57'; Núñez 89'	Stadium: Estádio da Mata Real; Attendance: 0 Referee: Hugo Filipe Ferreira de Campos Moreira Miguel

16 April 2021 27	Boavista	2–0	Paços de Ferreira	Porto
18:45 WET (UTC±0)	Njie 13'; Awaziem (yellow card) 29'; Gomes 42' (pen.) (yellow card) 81'; Porozo (yellow card) 90+8'	Report	Marcelo (yellow card) 62'	Stadium: Estádio do Bessa; Attendance: 0 Referee: Tiago Martins (referee)

20 April 2021 28	Paços de Ferreira	0–2	Farense	Paços de Ferreira
20:00 WET (UTC±0)	Bruno Costa (yellow card) 61'	Report	César Martins (yellow card) 29'; Gauld 77' (pen.); Fabrício Isidoro 84'	Stadium: Estádio da Mata Real; Attendance: 0 Referee: Manuel Mota

25 April 2021 29	Rio Ave	1–1	Paços de Ferreira	Vila do Conde
17:30 WET (UTC±0)	Borevković (yellow card) 34'; Pedro Amaral (yellow card) 36'; Fábio Coentrão 49'; Ivo Pinto (red card) 81'	Report	Zé Uilton 31'; Pedro Rebocho (yellow card) 70'	Stadium: Estádio dos Arcos; Attendance: 0 Referee: Manuel António Rodrigues Oliveira

30 April 2021 30	Paços de Ferreira	1–0	Belenenses	Paços de Ferreira
15:00 WET (UTC±0)	Bruno Costa (yellow card) 11'; Luíz Carlos (yellow card) 76'; João Pedro 85' (pen.); Fernando Fonseca (yellow card) 90+2'; Hélder Ferreira (red card) 90+3'	Report	Henrique (yellow card) 86'; Sithole (yellow card) 90+5'	Stadium: Estádio da Mata Real; Attendance: 0 Referee: Gustavo Fernandes Correira

5 May 2021 31	Sporting Braga	1–1	Paços de Ferreira	Braga
19:00 WET (UTC±0)	Galeno 78' (pen.); Abel Ruiz (yellow card) 90+2'	Report	João Pedro 26' (yellow card) 39'; João Amaral (yellow card) 33'; Jorge Silva (yellow card) 74'	Stadium: Estádio Municipal de Braga; Attendance: 0 Referee: Hélder Miguel Azevedo Malheiro

9 May 2021 32	Paços de Ferreira	1–1	Marítimo	Paços de Ferreira
19:00 WET (UTC±0)	Luíz Carlos 12'; Douglas Tanque (yellow card) 83'; Fernando Fonseca (yellow card) 88'; Bruno Costa (yellow card) 90+1'	Report	Tagueu 40'; Bambock (yellow card) 84'	Stadium: Estádio da Mata Real; Attendance: 0 Referee: João Pinheiro (referee)

14 May 2021 33	Paços de Ferreira	0–2	Gil Vicente	Paços de Ferreira
19:00 WET (UTC±0)	Douglas Tanque (yellow card) 76'; Marcelo (yellow card) 86'	Report	Lourency 11'; Pedro Marques 52'	Stadium: Estádio da Mata Real; Attendance: 0 Referee: Hugo Silva

18 May 2021 34	Tondela	2–3	Paços de Ferreira	Tondela
20:15 WET (UTC±0)	João Pedro 2' 34'; Martínez (yellow card) 17'; Telmo Arcanjo (yellow card) 62'; Anne (yellow card) 90'	Report	Douglas Tanque 5' 36'; Bruno Costa (yellow card) 33'; Hélder Ferreira 58'	Stadium: Estádio João Cardoso; Attendance: 0 Referee: Fábio Oliveira Melo

=== Taça de Portugal ===
22 November 2020 Third round	Oliveirense	0–4	Paços de Ferreira	Oliveira de Azeméis
17:15 WET (UTC±0)				Stadium: Estádio Carlos Osório

11 December 2020 Fourth round	Sporting CP	3–0	Paços de Ferreira	Lisbon
21:15 WET (UTC±0)	Porro (yellow card) 22'; Tomás 26'; Tabata 44'; Palhinha (yellow card) 61', (goal) 64'; Santos (yellow card) 71'	Report	Castanheira (yellow card) 82'	Stadium: Estádio José Alvalade; Attendance: 0 Referee: João Pinheiro

=== Taça da Liga ===
16 December 2020 Quarter-finals	Porto	2–1	Paços de Ferreira	Porto
18:45 WET (UTC±0)	Sarr 73'; Díaz 80'	Report	Castanheira 82'	Stadium: Estádio do Dragão; Attendance: 0 Referee: António Nobre
