= List of Portuguese football transfers winter 2022–23 =

This is a list of Portuguese football transfers for the 2022–23 winter transfer window. The winter transfer window will open 1 January 2023, although a few transfers may take place prior to that date. The window closes at midnight on 1 February 2023 although outgoing transfers might still happen to leagues in which the window is still open. Only moves involving Primeira Liga clubs are listed. Additionally, players without a club may join a club at any time.

== Transfers ==
Date	Name	Moving from	Moving to	Fee
4 November 2022	(Portugal) Paulinho	Moreirense	Marítimo	Free
15 November 2022	(Brazil) Ewerton	Portimonense	(Japan) Vegalta Sendai	Loan
7 December 2022	(Portugal) Alexandre Guedes	(Japan) Albirex Niigata	Paços de Ferreira	Undisclosed
9 December 2022	(Brazil) Marcelo Carné	(Brazil) CSA	Marítimo	Free
12 December 2022	(Japan) Kento Misao	(Japan) Kashima Antlers	Santa Clara	Undisclosed
16 December 2022	(Brazil) René Santos	(Saudi Arabia) Al Raed	Marítimo	Free
21 December 2022	(New Zealand) Nando Pijnaker	Rio Ave	(Republic of Ireland) Sligo Rovers	Undisclosed
24 December 2022	(Brazil) Wagner Leonardo	(Brazil) Santos	Portimonense	Free
24 December 2022	(Brazil) Léo Pereira	(Brazil) Atlético Goianiense	Marítimo	Loan
29 December 2022	(Brazil) Rodrigo Pinho	Benfica	(Brazil) Coritibia	€2m
30 December 2022	(Portugal) João Gamboa	(Belgium) OH Leuven	Estoril	Loan
2 January 2023	(Brazil) Maracás	(United Arab Emirates) Al Wahda	Paços de Ferreira	Undisclosed
4 January 2023	(Portugal) José Marafona	(Turkey) Alanyaspor	Paços de Ferreira	Undisclosed
5 January 2023	(Portugal) Diogo Gonçalves	Benfica	(Denmark) Copenhagen	Undisclosed
5 January 2023	(Colombia) Brayan Riascos	(Ukraine) Metalist Kharkiv	Marítimo	Loan
5 January 2023	(Portugal) Miguel Sousa	Marítimo	Mafra	Undisclosed
5 January 2023	(Argentina) Mateo Tanlongo	(Argentina) Rosario Central	Sporting CP	Free
6 January 2023	(United States) Benji Michel	(United States) Orlando City	Arouca	Free
6 January 2023	(Brazil) Val	(Brazil) Coritiba	Marítimo	Undisclosed
7 January 2023	(Portugal) João Ferreira	Benfica	(England) Watford	Undisclosed
8 January 2023	(Romania) Alex Dobre	(France) Dijon	Famalicão	Loan
8 January 2023	(Japan) Shuhei Kawasaki	Portimonense	(Japan) Vissel Kobe	Loan
11 January 2023	(Georgia (country)) Giorgi Makaridze	(Spain) Ponferradina	Marítimo	Free
11 January 2023	(Denmark) Casper Tengstedt	(Norway) Rosenborg	Benfica	€9.5m
11 January 2023	(Argentina) Lucho Vega	Marítimo	Covilhã	Loan
12 January 2023	(Norway) Andreas Schjelderup	(Denmark) Nordsjælland	Benfica	€14.5m
13 January 2023	(Portugal) Zé Carlos	Braga	Gil Vicente	Loan
13 January 2023	(Spain) Diego Llorente	Boavista	Leça	Loan
13 January 2023	(Portugal) Leandro Sanca	(Italy) Spezia	Famalicão	Loan
15 January 2023	(Brazil) Fábio Gomes	(Brazil) Atlético Mineiro	Paços de Ferreira	Loan
16 January 2023	(Brazil) Anderson	Casa Pia	(Turkey) Ankara Keçiörengücü	Undisclosed
16 January 2023	(Venezuela) Matías Lacava	(Venezuela) Academia Puerto Cabello	Vizela	Loan
17 January 2023	(Argentina) Marcos Díaz	(Argentina) Huracán	Santa Clara	Free
17 January 2023	(Spain) Carlos Isaac	Vizela	(Spain) Albacete	Undisclosed
17 January 2023	(Spain) Pedro Ortiz	(Spain) Sevilla	Vizela	Loan
17 January 2023	(Lithuania) Emilijus Zubas	Arouca	(Israel) Hapoel Tel Aviv	Undisclosed
18 January 2023	(Cameroon) Diederrick Joel Tagueu	Marítimo	(Saudi Arabia) Al-Hazem	Loan
19 January 2023	(Portugal) Pedro Amaral	Rio Ave	(Saudi Arabia) Khaleej	Undisclosed
19 January 2023	(Brazil) Marlon	(Brazil) Paysandu	Gil Vicente	Undisclosed
20 January 2023	(Portugal) Gonçalo Guedes	(England) Wolverhampton Wanderers	Benfica	Loan
20 January 2023	(Brazil) Helton Leite	Benfica	(Turkey) Antalyaspor	Undisclosed
20 January 2023	(Japan) Yuki Soma	(Japan) Nagoya Grampus	Casa Pia	Loan
21 January 2023	(Portugal) João Pedro	Tondela	Chaves	Free
23 January 2023	(Portugal) Henrique Araújo	Benfica	(England) Watford	Loan
24 January 2023	(Portugal) Tomás Tavares	Benfica	(Russia) Spartak Moscow	Undisclosed
25 January 2023	(Brazil) Carlos Eduardo	(Brazil) Palmeiras	Estoril	Loan
25 January 2023	(Colombia) Roberto Hinojosa	(Colombia) Unión Magdalena	Portimonense	Loan
25 January 2023	(South Korea) Park Ji-soo	(China) Guangzhou	Portimonense	Free
25 January 2023	(Brazil) Lucão	(United Arab Emirates) Al-Nasr	Portimonense	Free
25 January 2023	(Brazil) Maurício	(Russia) Rodina Moscow	Portimonense	Undisclosed
25 January 2023	(Cape Verde) Iuri Tavares	Estoril	(United States) Charlotte FC	Undisclosed
25 January 2023	(Brazil) Lucas Ventura	(Brazil) Cruzeiro	Portimonense	Free
25 January 2023	(Brazil) João Victor	Benfica	(France) Nantes	Loan
26 January 2023	(United States) John Brooks	Benfica	(Germany) 1899 Hoffenheim	Undisclosed
26 January 2023	(Brazil) Cassiano	(Saudi Arabia) Al Faisaly	Estoril	Undisclosed
27 January 2023	(Brazil) Léo Andrade	Marítimo	(Russia) Khimki	Undisclosed
27 January 2023	(Ghana) Francis Cann	Vizela	(Saudi Arabia) Al-Hazem	Loan
27 January 2023	(Angola) Beni Mukendi	Trofense	Casa Pia	Undisclosed
28 January 2023	(Brazil) Felippe Cardoso	(Brazil) Santos	Casa Pia	Free
28 January 2023	(Nigeria) Yusuf Lawal	(Azerbaijan) Neftçi	Arouca	Undisclosed
28 January 2023	(Sweden) Joe Mendes	(Sweden) AIK	Braga	Undisclosed
28 January 2023	(Portugal) Bruno Rodrigues	Braga	(Turkey) Fatih Karagümrük	Loan
28 January 2023	(Portugal) Miguel Silva	Marítimo	(Israel) Beitar Jerusalem	Undisclosed
28 January 2023	(Costa Rica) Roan Wilson	(Costa Rica) Municipal Grecia	Gil Vicente	Undisclosed
29 January 2023	(Portugal) Bruma	(Turkey) Fenerbahçe	Braga	Loan
29 January 2023	(Cameroon) Yan Eteki	Casa Pia	(Spain) Cartagena	Loan
30 January 2023	(Argentina) Germán Conti	Benfica	(Russia) Lokomotiv Moscow	Undisclosed
30 January 2023	(Brazil) Denílson	(United Arab Emirates) Hatta	Famalicão	Undisclosed
30 January 2023	(Portugal) Gil Dias	Benfica	(Germany) VfB Stuttgart	Undisclosed
30 January 2023	(Paraguay) Walter González	(Paraguay) Olimpia	Santa Clara	Loan
30 January 2023	(Brazil) Gabriel Pereira	Vilafranquense	Gil Vicente	Undisclosed
30 January 2023	(Portugal) Pizzi	(United Arab Emirates) Al Wahda	Braga	Free
31 January 2023	(Brazil) Ageu	(Brazil) Cruzeiro	Santa Clara	Undisclosed
31 January 2023	(Brazil) Ageu	Santa Clara	B-SAD	Loan
31 January 2023	(Costa Rica) Brandon Aguilera	(England) Nottingham Forest	Estoril	Loan
31 January 2023	(Brazil) Alemão	(Brazil) Corinthians	Portimonense	Undisclosed
31 January 2023	(Haiti) Carnejy Antoine	Casa Pia	(Israel) Hapoel Haifa	Undisclosed
31 January 2023	(Spain) Héctor Bellerín	(Spain) Barcelona	Sporting CP	Undisclosed
31 January 2023	(Portugal) Paulo Bernardo	Benfica	Paços de Ferreira	Loan
31 January 2023	(Portugal) Félix Correia	(Italy) Juventus	Marítimo	Loan
31 January 2023	(Angola) Depú	(Angola) Sagrada Esperança	Gil Vicente	Undisclosed
31 January 2023	(Netherlands) Finn Dicke	(Netherlands) ADO Den Haag	Estoril	Undisclosed
31 January 2023	(Ivory Coast) Ousmane Diomande	(Denmark) Midtjylland	Sporting CP	Undisclosed
31 January 2023	(Argentina) Enzo Fernández	Benfica	(England) Chelsea	€121m
31 January 2023	(Colombia) Carlos Garcés	(Colombia) Deportivo Pereira	Portimonense	Loan
31 January 2023	(France) Rafik Guitane	(France) Stade Reims	Estoril	Loan
31 January 2023	(Brazil) Zé Henrique	(Brazil) Palmeiras	Famalicão	Undisclosed
31 January 2023	(Guinea-Bissau) Hernâni Infande	Braga	Paços de Ferreira	Loan
31 January 2023	(Brazil) João Marcos	Santa Clara	B-SAD	Loan
31 January 2023	(Spain) José Marsà	Sporting CP	(Spain) Sporting Gijón	Loan
31 January 2023	(Guinea-Bissau) Nanu	Porto	Santa Clara	Loan
31 January 2023	(Brazil) Ygor Nogueira	(Mexico) Mazatlán	Santa Clara	Free
31 January 2023	(Brazil) Otávio	(Brazil) Flamengo	Famalicão	Loan
31 January 2023	(Spain) Pedro Porro	Sporting CP	(England) Tottenham Hotspur	Loan
31 January 2023	(Serbia) Haris Seferovic	Benfica	(Spain) Celta Vigo	Loan
31 January 2023	(Portugal) Manu Silva	Feirense	Vitória de Guimarães	€325k
31 January 2023	(Portugal) Tiago Ribeiro	(France) Monaco	Paços de Ferreira	Loan
31 January 2023	(Portugal) Rodrigo Valente	Santa Clara	(Uruguay) Penafiel	Loan
31 January 2023	(Portugal) Renato Veiga	Sporting CP	(Germany) FC Augsburg	Loan
31 January 2023	(Portugal) Vitinha	Braga	(France) Marseille	€32m
1 February 2023	(Portugal) Sérgio Conceição	(Belgium) RFC Seraing	Portimonense	Undisclosed
1 February 2023	(Brazil) Lucas Cunha	Gil Vicente	(Brazil) Red Bull Bragantino	Undisclosed
1 February 2023	(Brazil) Fabiano	Braga	(Turkey) Kasımpaşa	Loan
1 February 2023	(Portugal) Pedro Gomes	Boavista	Atlético CP	Loan
1 February 2023	(Colombia) Yony González	Benfica	Portimonense	Free
1 February 2023	(Nigeria) Abbas Ibrahim	Paços de Ferreira	(Azerbaijan) Zira	Free
1 February 2023	(Portugal) Kiki Silva	Leixões	Casa Pia	Undisclosed
1 February 2023	(Brazil) Bruno Viana	Braga	(Brazil) Coritiba	€1m
2 February 2023	(Uruguay) Cristian González	Santa Clara	(Russia) Khimki	Undisclosed
