= Nuno Lima =

Portuguese footballer

Personal information
- Full name: Nuno Miguel Reis Lima
- Date of birth: March 16, 2001 (age 25)
- Place of birth: Porto, Portugal
- Height: 1.85 m (6 ft 1 in)
- Position: Centre-back

Team information
- Current team: Alanyaspor
- Number: 3

Youth career
- 2009–2010: Anta
- 2010–2014: Porto
- 2014–2015: Paços de Ferreira
- 2015–2018: Feirense
- 2018–2020: Paços de Ferreira

Senior career*
Years	Team	Apps	(Gls)
2020–2023	Paços de Ferreira	45	(2)
2020–2021	→ Felgueiras (loan)	22	(2)
2023–	Alanyaspor	85	(4)
- * Club domestic league appearances and goals as of 23 August 2026

Nuno Miguel Reis Lima (born 16 March 2001) is a Portuguese professional footballer who plays as a centre-back for Turkish Süper Lig club Alanyaspor.

== Career ==
A youth product of Anta, Porto, Paços de Ferreira, and Feirense, Lima signed his first senior contract with Paços de Ferreira in 2020 and was promptly loaned to Felgueiras. He returned to in 2021, where he worked his way up to the senior team. He made his professional debut with Paços de Ferreira in a 2–1 Taça da Liga loss to Boavista on 23 September 2021.

On 14 September 2023, Lima moved to Turkish Süper Lig club Alanyaspor for an undisclosed fee.

== Career statistics ==
=== Club ===
As of match played 2 September 2023

Appearances and goals by club, season and competition
Club	Season	League			National cup		League cup		Continental		Total	
Club	Season	Division	Apps	Goals	Apps	Goals	Apps	Goals	Apps	Goals	Apps	Goals
Paços de Ferreira	2020–21	Primeira Liga	0	0	0	0	0	0	—		0	0
Paços de Ferreira	2021–22	Primeira Liga	13	0	1	0	2	0	0	0	16	0
Paços de Ferreira	2022–23	Primeira Liga	28	1	0	0	3	0	—		31	1
Paços de Ferreira	2023–24	Liga Portugal 2	4	1	0	0	1	0	—		5	1
Paços de Ferreira	Total		45	2	1	0	6	0	0	0	52	2
Felgueiras (loan)	2020–21	Campeonato de Portugal	22	2	2	0	—		—		24	2
Alanyaspor	2023–24	Süper Lig	0	0	0	0	—		—		0	0
Career total			67	4	3	0	6	0	0	0	76	4
