= Juan Delgado (Chilean footballer) =

Chilean footballer (born 1993)

Personal information
- Full name: Juan Antonio Delgado Baeza
- Date of birth: 5 March 1993 (age 33)
- Place of birth: Chillán, Chile
- Height: 1.76 m (5 ft 9 in)
- Positions: Winger; right-back

Team information
- Current team: Deportes Santa Cruz
- Number: 15

Youth career
- Colo-Colo

Senior career*
Years	Team	Apps	(Gls)
2011–2014	Colo-Colo B	34	(9)
2011–2016	Colo-Colo	98	(18)
2016–2019	Gimnàstic	41	(5)
2018–2019	→ Tondela (loan)	44	(7)
2019–2021	Necaxa	58	(7)
2021–2023	Paços Ferreira	62	(2)
2023–2024	Sheffield Wednesday	10	(1)
2024–2025	Everton	10	(0)
2025	Irapuato	1	(0)
2026–	Deportes Santa Cruz	1	(0)

International career^{‡}
2012–2013	Chile U20	4	(1)
2014–2023	Chile	15	(1)
- * Club domestic league appearances and goals as of 28 February 2026 ‡ National team caps and goals as of 08:43, 14 September 2023 (UTC)

Juan Antonio Delgado Baeza (born 5 March 1993) is a Chilean professional footballer who plays as a winger or right-back for Primera B club Deportes Santa Cruz.

== Club career ==
=== Colo-Colo ===
Born in Chillán, Delgado made his first team debut for Colo-Colo at the age of 17 during the 2011 Torneo Apertura. After nearly 2 years playing mostly in the B-team, Delgado became a regular under Héctor Tapia's management, with the first main achievement of his being a goal in a 3–2 victory against the club's main rivals Universidad de Chile. Delgado retained protagonism during the 2014 Torneo Clausura where he played 14 games and scored two goals as Colo-Colo won the title.

=== Gimnàstic ===
On 5 August 2016, Delgado signed a four-year contract with Spanish Segunda División side Gimnàstic de Tarragona.

=== Sheffield Wednesday ===
On 24 July 2023, he joined EFL Championship side Sheffield Wednesday. He made his debut starting against Southampton on 4 August 2023. He scored his maiden Wednesday goal a week later, getting the first goal in a 4–2 defeat against Hull City. Whilst on international duty he returned to Sheffield Wednesday early to undergo hip surgery. On 17 May 2024, it was confirmed he would be released following the expiration of his contract.

=== Everton de Viña del Mar ===
On 2 July 2024, Delgado joined Everton de Viña del Mar on a deal until the end of the 2025 season. He ended his contract in August 2025.

=== Deportes Santa Cruz ===
In January 2026, Delgado returned to his homeland from Mexico and signed with Deportes Santa Cruz in the Liga de Ascenso.

== International career ==
After playing the 2014 Toulon Tournament with the U-20 squad and showing good form in Colo-Colo, Delgado received his first call-up to the national squad for the friendlies against Mexico and Haiti. He made his debut against Mexico, playing a little over five minutes as a late substitute. Days later, he was a starter against Haiti, where he scored his first international goal in the 21st minute.

== Career statistics ==
=== Club ===
As of match played 24 May 2025

Club statistics
Club	Season	League			National cup (Note: Includes Copa Chile, Copa del Rey, Taça de Portugal)		League cup (Note: Includes Taça da Liga, EFL Cup)		Continental		Total	
Club	Season	Division	Apps	Goals	Apps	Goals	Apps	Goals	Apps	Goals	Apps	Goals
Colo-Colo B	2012	Segunda División Profesional	21	4	—		—		—		21	4
Colo-Colo B	2013	Segunda División Profesional	9	2	—		—		—		9	2
Colo-Colo B	2013–14	Segunda División Profesional	4	3	—		—		—		4	3
Colo-Colo B	Total		34	9	—		—		—		34	9
Colo-Colo	2011	Primera División de Chile	1	0	0	0	—		—		1	0
Colo-Colo	2012	Primera División de Chile	0	0	0	0	—		—		0	0
Colo-Colo	2013–14	Primera División de Chile	23	3	4	1	—		0	0	27	4
Colo-Colo	2014–15	Primera División de Chile	32	8	1	0	—		4 (Note: Appearances in Copa Libertadores)	0	37	8
Colo-Colo	2015–16	Primera División de Chile	20	3	8	3	—		5	0	33	6
Colo-Colo	Total		76	14	13	4	—		9	0	98	18
Gimnàstic	2016–17	Segunda División	24	4	3	0	—		—		27	4
Gimnàstic	2017–18	Segunda División	17	1	1	0	—		—		18	1
Gimnàstic	Total		41	5	4	0	—		—		45	5
Tondela (loan)	2017–18	Primeira Liga	11	1	0	0	—		—		11	1
Tondela (loan)	2018–19	Primeira Liga	33	6	2	2	3	0	—		38	8
Tondela (loan)	Total		44	7	2	2	3	0	—		49	9
Necaxa	2019–20	Liga MX	29	4	0	0	—		—		29	4
Necaxa	2020–21	Liga MX	29	2	—		—		—		29	2
Necaxa	Total		58	6	0	0	—		—		58	6
Paços de Ferreira	2021–22	Primeira Liga	31	2	2	0	3	0	4 (Note: Appearances in UEFA Europa Conference League)	0	40	2
Paços de Ferreira	2022–23	Primeira Liga	31	0	1	0	2	0	—		34	0
Paços de Ferreira	Total		62	2	3	0	5	0	4	0	74	2
Sheffield Wednesday	2023–24	EFL Championship	10	1	0	0	2	0	—		12	1
Everton	2024	Chilean Primera División	2	0	1	0	—		—		3	0
Everton	2025	Chilean Primera División	6	0	0	0	3	0	—		9	0
Everton	Total		8	0	1	0	3	0	0	0	12	0
Career total			333	44	23	8	13	0	9	0	378	52

=== International ===
As of 13 September 2023

Chile
Year	Apps	Goals
2014	4	1
2015	1	0
2022	4	0
2023	6	0
Total	15	1

International goals

Score and Result lists Chile's goals first

#	Date	Venue	Opponent	Score	Result	Competition
1.	9 September 2014	Lockhart Stadium, Fort Lauderdale, United States	Haiti	1–0	1–0	Friendly

== Honours ==
Colo-Colo

- Primera División de Chile: 2014 Clausura, 2015 Apertura
