= Matchoi Djaló =

Bissau-Guinean footballer

Personal information
- Full name: Matchoi Bobó Djaló
- Date of birth: 10 April 2003 (age 23)
- Place of birth: Bissau, Guinea-Bissau
- Height: 1.80 m (5 ft 11 in)
- Position: Attacking midfielder

Team information
- Current team: Nacional
- Number: 20

Youth career
- Academia Mabodja
- –2019: Paços de Ferreira

Senior career*
Years	Team	Apps	(Gls)
2019–2024	Paços de Ferreira	83	(10)
2024–2026	İstanbul Başakşehir	9	(0)
2025–2026	→ Wisła Płock (loan)	18	(0)
2026–	Nacional	4	(1)

International career
2019–2020	Portugal U17	8	(1)
2021	Portugal U18	2	(2)
2021–2022	Portugal U19	9	(3)
2022–2023	Portugal U20	4	(0)
- * Club domestic league appearances and goals as of 12 September 2026

Matchoi Bobó Djaló (born 10 April 2003) is a professional footballer who plays as an attacking midfielder for Primeira Liga club Nacional. Born in Guinea-Bissau, he represents Portugal internationally.

== Career ==
Djaló began his career at Academia Mabodja in Guinea-Bissau, before moving to Portugal, signing for Paços de Ferreira.

On 10 August 2019, Djaló made his debut for Paços de Ferreira, coming on as a 72nd-minute substitute for Pedrinho Moreira in a 5–0 loss away to reigning champions Benfica. At the age of 16 years and 122 days, he was the youngest player ever to play in the Primeira Liga.

On 12 March 2024, it was announced that Djaló would join Başakşehir on a three-year at the end of the season.

On 13 August 2025, Djaló joined newly-promoted Ekstraklasa club Wisła Płock on a season-long loan deal.

On 13 August 2026, Djaló returned to Portugal and signed with Nacional for two seasons.

== Personal life ==
Djaló is the son of the retired footballer Bobó Djalo.

== Career statistics ==
As of match played 23 May 2026

Appearances and goals by club, season and competition
Club	Season	League			National cup (Note: Includes Taça de Portugal, Turkish Cup, Polish Cup)		League cup (Note: Includes Taça da Liga)		Other		Total	
Club	Season	Division	Apps	Goals	Apps	Goals	Apps	Goals	Apps	Goals	Apps	Goals
Paços de Ferreira	2019–20	Primeira Liga	3	1	0	0	1	0	0	0	4	1
Paços de Ferreira	2020–21	Primeira Liga	3	0	0	0	1	0	0	0	4	1
Paços de Ferreira	2021–22	Primeira Liga	23	1	1	0	2	0	3 (Note: Appearance(s) in UEFA Conference League)	0	29	1
Paços de Ferreira	2022–23	Primeira Liga	22	1	1	0	1	0	0	0	24	1
Paços de Ferreira	2023–24	Liga Portugal 2	32	7	0	0	1	0	0	0	33	7
Paços de Ferreira	Toplam		83	10	2	0	6	0	3	0	94	10
Başakşehir F.K.	2024–25	Süper Lig	9	0	1	0	—		1	0	11	0
Wisła Płock (loan)	2025–26	Ekstraklasa	18	0	1	0	—		—		19	0
Career total			110	10	4	0	6	0	4	0	124	10
