= Bruno Costa (footballer, born 1997) =

Portuguese footballer

Personal information
- Full name: Bruno Xavier Almeida Costa
- Date of birth: 19 April 1997 (age 29)
- Place of birth: Oliveira de Azeméis, Portugal
- Height: 1.74 m (5 ft 9 in)
- Position: Midfielder

Youth career
- 2005–2009: Feirense
- 2009–2016: Porto

Senior career*
Years	Team	Apps	(Gls)
2016–2019	Porto B	50	(4)
2018–2020	Porto	4	(0)
2020–2021	Portimonense	17	(0)
2020–2021	→ Paços Ferreira (loan)	31	(4)
2021–2023	Porto	18	(0)
2023	Porto B	15	(3)
2023–2024	Valenciennes	10	(0)
2024	Vizela	8	(0)
2024–2025	Nacional	18	(2)
2025–2026	Gyeongnam	17	(2)
2026	Gimhae	13	(1)
2026	CFR Cluj	3	(0)

International career
2012	Portugal U15	2	(0)
2012–2013	Portugal U16	6	(0)
2013	Portugal U17	2	(1)
2016	Portugal U19	4	(1)
2016–2017	Portugal U20	9	(1)
2018	Portugal U21	3	(0)
- * Club domestic league appearances and goals as of 16 August 2026

Bruno Xavier Almeida Costa (born 19 April 1997) is a Portuguese professional footballer who plays mainly as a midfielder but also as a right-back.

== Club career ==
=== Porto ===
Born in Oliveira de Azeméis, Aveiro District, Costa joined FC Porto in 2009 at the age of 12, from C.D. Feirense. On 14 August 2016, he made his professional debut with the former's reserves in a 1–0 home win against Académico de Viseu F.C. in the LigaPro where he played 35 minutes. He scored his first goal in the competition on 22 October 2017, helping the hosts to defeat Varzim S.C. by 3–0.

Costa appeared in his first competitive match with the first team on 6 March 2018 in the last 16 of the UEFA Champions League away to Liverpool, a goalless draw in the second leg following a 5–0 loss at the Estádio do Dragão. His Primeira Liga bow took place on 13 April 2019, in a 3–0 away victory over Portimonense S.C. in which he was an 82nd-minute substitute for Yacine Brahimi.

=== Portimonense ===
It was reported on 8 January 2020 that Costa had signed for Portimonense also of the top division on loan for the rest of the season. Two days later, the Algarvean club's president confirmed this was instead an 18-month transfer. He made his debut on 11 January in a goalless home game with F.C. Paços de Ferreira, replacing Fernando Medeiros at half-time.

Costa joined Paços de Ferreira on 17 August 2020, on a season-long loan. He scored his first goal in the Portuguese top flight on 30 October, from a penalty in a 3–2 home defeat of former side Porto.

=== Return to Porto ===
Costa returned to Porto on 6 July 2021, agreeing to a three-year deal. In January 2022, following successive injuries to Wilson Manafá and João Mário, he was used by manager Sérgio Conceição as an emergency right-back. He scored his only competitive goal on 16 October that year, closing the 6–0 away win over Anadia F.C. in the third round of the Taça de Portugal.

In January 2023, Costa was relegated to the B team after reportedly falling out with Conceição due to a lack of effort in practice. On 4 February, he equalised an eventual 1–2 home loss against B-SAD through a Panenka-style penalty.

=== Valenciennes ===
On 2 September 2023, Costa signed a one-year contract with French Ligue 2 club Valenciennes FC. He left by mutual consent in January 2024.

=== Later career ===
Costa returned to Portugal and its top tier shortly after leaving Valenciennes, joining F.C. Vizela on a five-month deal. On 28 July 2024, he agreed to a two-year contract at C.D. Nacional in the same league.

On 29 December 2024, Costa scored his first goal for the Madeirans, but in a 2–1 loss at Rio Ave FC. The following round, he provided an assist for Zé Vitor as the hosts beat his former employers Porto 2–0.

Costa signed for K League 2 club Gyeongnam FC on 24 June 2025. He scored on his debut on 5 July, a 1–1 home draw against Ansan Greeners FC, and dedicated the goal to Diogo Jota and André Silva, Portuguese brothers killed in a car crash in Spain two days earlier.

Ahead of the 2026 season, Costa moved to Gimhae FC 2008 also in the Korean second division. He moved to Romanian Liga I's CFR Cluj on 21 July that year, rejoining his compatriot manager António Folha who had already coached him at Porto B and Portimonense.

== International career ==
Costa earned the first of his three caps for Portugal at under-21 level on 25 May 2018, playing 45 minutes in the 3–2 friendly win over Italy in Estoril.

== Career statistics ==
As of match played 16 August 2026

Appearances and goals by club, season and competition
Club	Season	League			National cup (Note: Includes Taça de Portugal, Coupe de France)		League cup (Note: Includes Taça da Liga)		Continental		Other		Total	
Club	Season	Division	Apps	Goals	Apps	Goals	Apps	Goals	Apps	Goals	Apps	Goals	Apps	Goals
Porto B	2016–17	LigaPro	6	0	—		—		—		—		6	0
Porto B	2017–18	LigaPro	31	3	—		—		—		—		31	3
Porto B	2018–19	LigaPro	13	1	—		—		—		—		13	1
Porto B	Total		50	4	—		—		—		—		50	4
Porto	2017–18	Primeira Liga	0	0	0	0	0	0	1 (Note: Appearances in UEFA Champions League)	0	—		1	0
Porto	2018–19	Primeira Liga	2	0	0	0	2	0	2	0	0	0	6	0
Porto	2019–20	Primeira Liga	2	0	1	0	2	0	1 (Note: Appearances in UEFA Europa League)	0	—		6	0
Porto	Total		4	0	1	0	4	0	4	0	0	0	13	0
Portimonense	2019–20	Primeira Liga	17	0	—		—		—		—		17	0
Paços Ferreira (loan)	2020–21	Primeira Liga	31	4	2	0	0	0	—		—		33	4
Porto	2021–22	Primeira Liga	12	0	3	0	2	0	4 (Note: One appearance in UEFA Champions League, three appearances in UEFA Europa League)	0	—		21	0
Porto	2022–23	Primeira Liga	6	0	2	1	1	0	3	0	1 (Note: Appearance in Supertaça Cândido de Oliveira)	0	13	1
Porto	Total		18	0	5	1	3	0	7	0	1	0	34	1
Porto B	2022–23	Liga Portugal 2	15	3	—		—		—		—		15	3
Valenciennes	2023–24	Ligue 2	10	0	1	0	—		—		—		11	0
Vizela	2023–24	Primeira Liga	8	0	1	0	—		—		—		9	0
Nacional	2024–25	Primeira Liga	18	2	1	0	0	0	—		—		19	2
Gyeongnam	2025	K League 2	17	2	—		—		—		—		17	2
Gimhae	2026	K League 2	13	1	0	0	—		—		—		13	1
CFR Cluj	2026–27	Liga I	3	0	—		—		2 (Note: Appearances in UEFA Conference League)	0	—		5	0
Career total			204	16	11	1	7	0	13	0	1	0	235	17

== Honours ==
Porto

- Primeira Liga: 2019–20, 2021–22
- Taça de Portugal: 2019–20, 2021–22, 2022–23
- Taça da Liga: 2022–23
- Supertaça Cândido de Oliveira: 2022
