= Mauro Couto =

Portuguese footballer (born 2005)

Personal information
- Full name: Mauro Meireles Couto
- Date of birth: 15 November 2005 (age 20)
- Place of birth: Paredes, Portugal
- Height: 1.70 m (5 ft 7 in)
- Position: Winger

Team information
- Current team: Sporting CP B
- Number: 78

Youth career
- 2012–2014: FC Cête
- 2014–2018: Penafiel
- 2018–2020: Dragon Force
- 2020–2021: Padroense
- 2021–2022: Paços de Ferreira

Senior career*
Years	Team	Apps	(Gls)
2022–2024	Paços de Ferreira	5	(0)
2023–2024	→ Sporting CP B (loan)	12	(3)
2024–	Sporting CP B	59	(6)
2024–	Sporting CP	1	(0)

International career^{‡}
2023	Portugal U18	6	(0)
2023	Portugal U19	5	(1)
2024–	Portugal U20	7	(1)
- * Club domestic league appearances and goals as of 20 June 2026 ‡ National team caps and goals as of 00:42, 2 December 2025 (UTC)

Mauro Meireles Couto (born 15 November 2005) is a Portuguese professional footballer who plays as a winger for Liga Portugal 2 club Sporting CP B.

== Club career ==
Couto is a youth product of the academies of FC Cête, Penafiel, Dragon Force, Padroense and Paços de Ferreira. He made his senior and professional debut with Paços de Ferreira as a substitute in a 3–2 Primeira Liga loss to Casa Pia on 11 September 2022. On 31 January 2023, he signed his first professional contract with Paços de Ferreira until 2025. For the 2023–24 season he was loan to Sporting CP B, and he was formally signed to Sporting on 9 January 2024.

== International career ==
Couto is a youth international for Portugal. In March 2023, he was first called up to the Portugal U18s for a set of friendlies.
