= João Vigário =

Portuguese footballer

Personal information
- Full name: João Miguel Ribeiro Vigário
- Date of birth: 20 November 1995 (age 30)
- Place of birth: Gondomar, Portugal
- Height: 1.80 m (5 ft 11 in)
- Positions: Left-back; winger

Team information
- Current team: Paredes
- Number: 13

Youth career
- 2004–2007: Ataense
- 2007–2012: Salgueiros
- 2013–2014: Vitória Guimarães

Senior career*
Years	Team	Apps	(Gls)
2012–2013	Salgueiros	23	(6)
2014–2018	Vitória Guimarães B	96	(7)
2015–2019	Vitória Guimarães	20	(0)
2018–2019	→ Estoril (loan)	4	(0)
2019–2020	Tondela	1	(0)
2020	→ Nacional (loan)	4	(2)
2020–2021	Nacional	21	(1)
2021–2023	Paços Ferreira	1	(0)
2024	Lleida Esportiu	13	(0)
2024–2026	Fafe	55	(2)
2026–	Paredes	3	(0)

International career
2014–2015	Portugal U20	6	(2)
- * Club domestic league appearances and goals as of 22:21, 3 September 2026 (UTC)

João Miguel Ribeiro Vigário (born 20 November 1995) is a Portuguese professional footballer who plays as a left-back or winger for Liga 3 club Paredes.

== Club career ==
Born in Gondomar, Porto District, Vigário finished his development at Vitória S.C. after arriving from S.C. Salgueiros. He made his senior debut with the latter's reserves in the Segunda Liga, playing his first match on 17 August 2014 in a 1–0 away loss against U.D. Oliveirense and scoring his first goals the following 25 January in the 2–1 win at C.D. Feirense.

Vigário appeared in his first competitive game for the first team on 28 January 2015, as a 66th-minute substitute for David Caiado in a 2–2 draw away to Boavista F.C. in the group stage of the Taça da Liga. His Primeira Liga bow took place on 15 August in the first round of the new season, when he took the field for the last minutes of the 3–0 away defeat against FC Porto.

In July 2018, Vigário was loaned to second-division club G.D. Estoril Praia. He returned to the top flight in summer 2019, signing a two-year contract with C.D. Tondela.

Vigário joined second-tier C.D. Nacional in January 2020, on loan. He scored on his debut as the hosts beat U.D. Vilafranquense 5–1, and the move was subsequently made permanent. Following promotion as champions as the campaign was cut short due to the COVID-19 pandemic, he then scored his only goal in the main division on 13 February 2021 in a 2–3 home loss against S.C. Farense, and the Madeirans were eventually relegated again.

On 6 July 2021, Vigário agreed to a two-year deal at F.C. Paços de Ferreira. He made only three official appearances at the Estádio da Mata Real due to injury problems, and left in June 2023.

Vigário moved abroad for the first time on 2 January 2024, signing a short-term contract with Segunda Federación side Lleida Esportiu. He returned to his country in the summer, going on to represent AD Fafe and U.S.C. Paredes in the Liga 3.

== International career ==
Vigário won his first cap for Portugal at under-20 level on 17 November 2014, in a 1–1 friendly draw against England held in Coimbra. Selected for the 2015 FIFA World Cup, he played once in an eventual quarter-final exit, scoring in the 4–0 group-stage victory over Qatar.
