= Tiago Ribeiro (footballer, born 2002) =

Portuguese footballer

Personal information
- Full name: Tiago Miguel Hora Ribeiro
- Date of birth: 14 March 2002 (age 24)
- Place of birth: Vila Nova de Gaia, Portugal
- Height: 1.85 m (6 ft 1 in)
- Position: Defensive midfielder

Team information
- Current team: Santa Clara
- Number: 20

Youth career
- 2009–2018: Porto
- 2018–2020: Monaco

Senior career*
Years	Team	Apps	(Gls)
2020–2024	Monaco B	28	(6)
2022–2024	Monaco	1	(0)
2022	→ Valencia B (loan)	14	(0)
2023–2024	→ Paços de Ferreira (loan)	15	(1)
2024–2026	Feirense	42	(2)
2026–	Santa Clara	7	(1)

International career^{‡}
2017	Portugal U15	5	(0)
2017–2018	Portugal U16	11	(0)
2018–2019	Portugal U17	15	(0)
2019	Portugal U18	3	(0)
2021	Portugal U20	1	(0)
- * Club domestic league appearances and goals as of 20 September 2026 ‡ National team caps and goals as of 7 September 2021

Tiago Miguel Hora Ribeiro (born 14 March 2002) is a Portuguese professional footballer who plays mainly as a defensive midfielder for Primeira Liga club Santa Clara.

== Club career ==
A youth product of Porto, Ribeiro joined the youth academy of Monaco in 2018. He worked his way up their youth category, making senior debut with their reserves in 2020 in the Championnat National 2. He made his professional debut with the senior Monaco team in a 3–2 Ligue 1 loss to Montepellier on 23 January 2022, coming on as a late sub in the 89th minute.

On 3 August 2022, Monaco sent Ribeiro on loan with an option-to-buy to Spanish side Valencia.

On 31 January 2023, Monaco recalled Ribeiro from Valencia and sent him on another loan to Primeira Liga club Paços de Ferreira.

On 3 July 2026, Ribeiro signed a three-season contract with Santa Clara in Primeira Liga.

== International career ==
Ribeiro is a youth international for Portugal, having represented them at the Portugal U15, U16, U17, U18, and U20 levels.

== Personal life ==
His father Sérgio and his brother, also named Sérgio, also played football professionally.

== Career statistics ==
As of match played 20 September 2026

Appearances and goals by club, season and competition
Club	Season	League			National cup		League cup		Europe		Total	
Club	Season	Division	Apps	Goals	Apps	Goals	Apps	Goals	Apps	Goals	Apps	Goals
Monaco B	2020–21	CFA	0	0	—		—		—		0	0
Monaco B	2021–22	CFA	28	6	—		—		—		28	6
Monaco B	Total		28	6	—		—		—		28	6
Monaco	2021–22	Ligue 1	1	0	—		—		—		1	0
Valencia B (loan)	2022–23	Segunda Federación	14	0	—		—		—		14	0
Paços de Ferreira (loan)	2022–23	Primeira Liga	5	0	—		1	0	—		6	0
Paços de Ferreira (loan)	2023–24	Liga Portugal 2	10	1	—		—		—		10	1
Paços de Ferreira (loan)	Total		15	1	—		1	0	—		16	1
Feirense	2024–25	Liga Portugal 2	11	0	—		—		—		11	0
Feirense	2025–26	Liga Portugal 2	31	2	—		—		—		31	2
Feirense	Total		42	2	—		—		—		42	2
Santa Clara	2026–27	Primeira Liga	7	1	0	0	0	0	—		7	1
Career total			107	10	0	0	1	0	0	0	108	10
