= Nigel Thomas =

Curaçaoan footballer (born 2001)

Personal information
- Date of birth: 1 February 2001 (age 25)
- Place of birth: Rotterdam, Netherlands
- Height: 1.77 m (5 ft 10 in)
- Position: Left winger

Team information
- Current team: ADO Den Haag
- Number: 27

Youth career
- 2010–2012: Spartaan '20
- 2012–2016: Sparta Rotterdam
- 2016–2019: PSV

Senior career*
Years	Team	Apps	(Gls)
2019–2022	Jong PSV	58	(8)
2022–2023	Paços de Ferreira	34	(4)
2023–2025	Viborg	16	(1)
2024	→ Nacional (loan)	9	(1)
2025	→ Académico de Viseu (loan)	8	(0)
2025–	ADO Den Haag	35	(7)

International career^{‡}
2015–2016	Netherlands U15	9	(1)
2016–2017	Netherlands U16	9	(0)
2017–2018	Netherlands U17	13	(1)
2026–	Curaçao	1	(0)
Medal record
Representing Netherlands
UEFA European Under-17 Championship
Winner	2018 England
- * Club domestic league appearances and goals as of 24 October 2026 ‡ National team caps and goals as of 15 November 2026

Nigel Thomas (born 1 February 2001) is a professional footballer who plays as a left winger for Eerste Divisie club ADO Den Haag. Born in the Netherlands, he represents the Curaçao national team.

== Club career ==
Thomas joined Paços de Ferreira on 8 July 2022, signing a three-year contract.

Thomas joined Danish Superliga club Viborg on 2 August 2023, agreeing on a deal until June 2026. In his debut for the club on 7 August, he scored the match-winning goal against OB to win 2–1. After one season with the club, it was rumoured that he would return to Portugal during the 2024 summer transfer window and was later confirmed on 23 July that he would be loaned out to Portuguese club C.D. Nacional on a one-year deal. During January, it was announced that his loan deal with Nacional had ended and he was instead loaned out to Académico de Viseu of Liga Portugal 2.

Thomas was sold to Dutch club ADO Den Haag of the Eerste Divisie on 8 August 2025. He signed a two-year contract, with the option for an additional year.

== International career ==
Born in the Netherlands, Thomas is of Curaçaoan descent. He is a youth international for the Netherlands. He was called up to the preliminary squad for the Curaçao national team for the 2021 CONCACAF Gold Cup.

In September 2026, he was called up for the 2026–27 CONCACAF Nations League A matches against Costa Rica, Nicaragua and Trinidad and Tobago.

On 16 November 2026, he made his debut for the team away against Panama, coming on as a substitution in the second half for Jerolldino Bergraaf. He was later sent off after receiving two yellow cards after 77 and 82 minutes.

== Career statistics ==
As of match played 27 October 2026

Appearances and goals by club, season and competition
Club	Season	League			National cup (Note: Includes Taça de Portugal, Danish Cup, KNVB Cup)		Other		Total	
Club	Season	Division	Apps	Goals	Apps	Goals	Apps	Goals	Apps	Goals
Jong PSV	2018–19	Eerste Divisie	2	0	0	0	0	0	2	0
Jong PSV	2019–20	Eerste Divisie	3	0	0	0	0	0	3	0
Jong PSV	2020–21	Eerste Divisie	30	5	0	0	0	0	30	5
Jong PSV	2021–22	Eerste Divisie	23	3	0	0	0	0	23	3
Jong PSV	Total		58	8	0	0	0	0	58	8
Paços de Ferreira	2022–23	Primeira Liga	34	4	1	0	3 (Note: Appearances in Taça da Liga)	0	38	4
Viborg	2023–24	Danish Superliga	16	1	1	0	0	0	17	1
Nacional	2024–25	Primeira Liga	6	1	0	0	0	0	6	1
Académico de Viseu	2024–25	Liga Portugal 2	8	0	0	0	0	0	8	0
ADO Den Haag	2025–26	Eerste Divisie	29	4	1	0	—		30	4
ADO Den Haag	2026–27	Eredivisie	6	3	1	1	—		7	4
ADO Den Haag	Total		35	7	2	1	—		37	8
Career Total			147	20	4	1	3	0	164	21

== Honours ==
ADO Den Haag

- Eerste Divisie: 2025–26

Netherlands U17

- UEFA European Under-17 Championship: 2018
