= Rui Pires =

Portuguese footballer

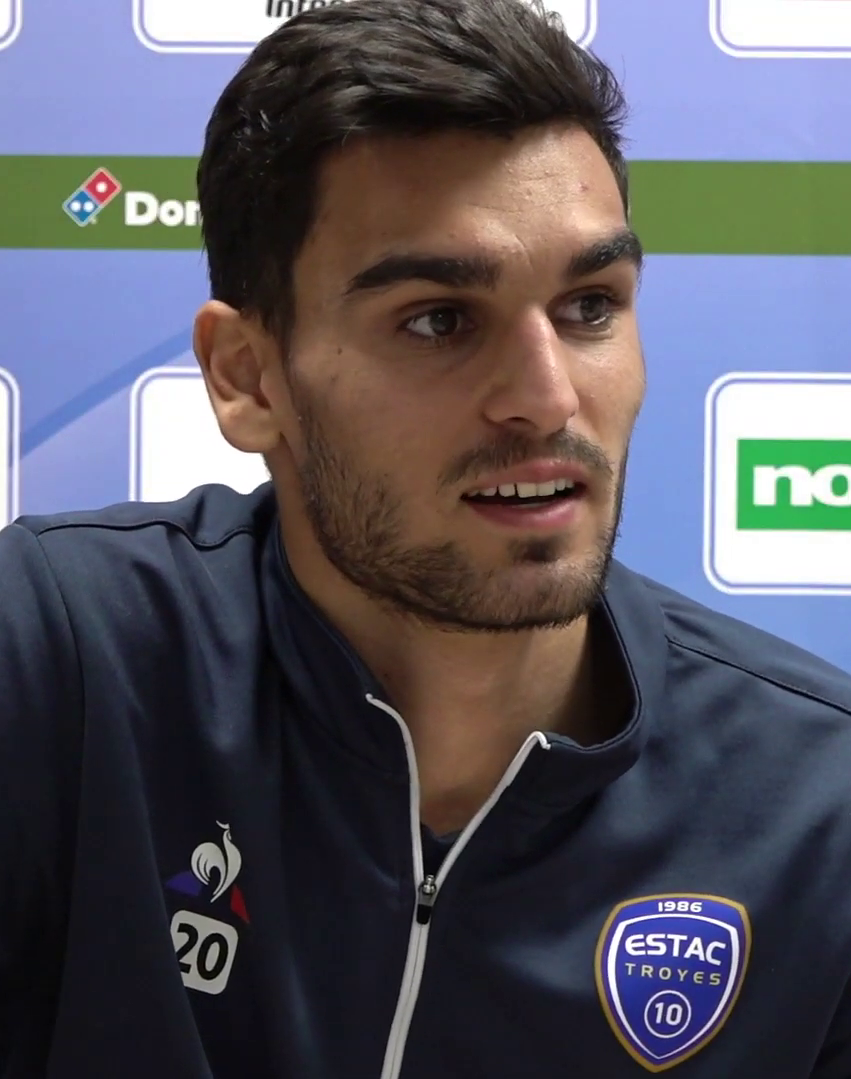
- Pires in a press conference with Troyes in 2019

Personal information
- Full name: Rui Miguel Guerra Pires
- Date of birth: 22 March 1998 (age 28)
- Place of birth: Mirandela, Portugal
- Height: 1.82 m (6 ft 0 in)
- Position: Defensive midfielder

Team information
- Current team: Preah Khan Reach Svay Rieng
- Number: 6

Youth career
- –2008: Mirandela
- 2009–2015: Porto

Senior career*
Years	Team	Apps	(Gls)
2016–2019	Porto B	76	(0)
2019–2022	Troyes	35	(0)
2021–2023	Paços de Ferreira	61	(0)
2023–2026	Lion City Sailors	67	(2)
2026–	Preah Khan Reach Svay Rieng	4	(1)

International career
2015–2016	Portugal U18	7	(0)
2016–2017	Portugal U19	5	(0)
2017–2018	Portugal U20	6	(0)
Medal record
Men's football
Representing Portugal
UEFA European Under-19 Championship
Runner-up	2017 Georgia
- * Club domestic league appearances and goals as of 26 October 2026

Rui Miguel Guerra Pires (born 22 March 1998) is a Portuguese professional footballer who plays as a defensive midfielder for Cambodian Premier League club Preah Khan Reach Svay Rieng.

== Club career ==
=== Porto B ===
Rui began his journey in the acclaimed youth system of FC Porto, where he progressed through the ranks, featuring prominently in its Under-15, U17, and U19 sides. He was subsequently promoted to Porto's B side.

On 7 August 2016, Pires made his professional debut with Porto B in a 2016–17 LigaPro match against Aves.

=== Troyes ===
On 9 July 2019, Pires moved on a free transfer to Ligue 2 side Troyes. He make his debut for the club on 26 July in 2–0 win over Chamois Niort. On 26 October, Pires assisted Lenny Pintor who then went on to scored the winner in the 85th minute in a 1–0 win over Lorient. In December, he suffered anterior cruciate ligament injury ending his season prematurely. He ended up making 13 appearances in his first season.

Pires make his returned on 28 September 2020 coming on as a substitution in a 1–0 win over Clermont Foot. He won the French second-tier Ligue 2 with Troyes in the 2020–21 season where he make 19 appearances.

=== Paços de Ferreira ===
On 26 July 2021, Pires returned to Portugal and joined Paços de Ferreira on loan. His loan was made permanent after a successful loan.

During his time with Paços de Ferreira, Rui showed his capabilities on the European stage, making two appearances in the 2021–22 UEFA Europa Conference League qualifiers against Tottenham.

=== Lion City Sailors ===
On 29 June 2023, it was reported by the Portuguese press that Pires had moved to Singapore to play for Lion City Sailors. He was officially announced as the new signing for the team on 14 July 2023 signing a two-year contract however, as the foreign quota for the league slot is full, Pires will be registered in the club 2023–24 AFC Champions League matches instead. On 26 July 2023, Pires make his debut for the club in a friendly match against Tottenham at the Singapore National Stadium. On 20 September 2023, Pires played his first official game for the club in the 2023–24 AFC Champions League group stage fixture against Thai club Bangkok United in a 2–1 lost.

On 18 July 2024, Pires make his league debut in a 5–0 lost to Tampines Rovers. During the 2024–25 ASEAN Club Championship against Indonesian club Borneo Samarinda, he picked up his second yellow card 35 seconds after receiving the first yellow where he saw red for the first time of his career.

Despite Maxime Lestienne's equaliser in the 91st minute of the 2025 AFC Champions League Two final against Sharjah, the Sailors finished as a runner-up after conceding in the 97th minute to finish the game in a 1–2 defeat.

On 22 September 2025, Pires scored his first career goal in a 7–0 win over Tanjong Pagar United.

=== Preah Khan Reach Svay Rieng ===
On 11 July 2026, Pires signed for Cambodian Premier League club Preah Khan Reach Svay Rieng.

== Career statistics ==
=== Club ===
As of match played 15 Oct 26

Appearances and goals by club, season and competition
Club	Season	League			Domestic Cup		League Cup		Continental		Total	
Club	Season	Division	Apps	Goals	Apps	Goals	Apps	Goals	Apps	Goals	Apps	Goals
Porto B	2016–17	LigaPro	14	0	0	0	0	0	0	0	14	0
Porto B	2017–18	LigaPro	28	0	0	0	0	0	0	0	28	0
Porto B	2018–19	LigaPro	27	0	0	0	0	0	0	0	27	0
Porto B	Total		69	0	0	0	0	0	0	0	69	0
Troyes	2019–20	Ligue 2	13	0	1	0	1	0	0	0	15	0
Troyes	2020–21	Ligue 2	19	0	1	0	0	0	0	0	20	0
Troyes	Total		32	0	2	0	1	0	0	0	35	0
Paços de Ferreira	2021–22	Primeira Liga	21	0	3	0	2	0	2	0	28	0
Paços de Ferreira	2022–23	Primeira Liga	31	0	1	0	1	0	0	0	33	0
Paços de Ferreira	Total		52	0	4	0	3	0	2	0	61	0
Lion City Sailors	2023	Singapore Premier League	0	0	0	0	0	0	6	0	6	0
Lion City Sailors	2024–25	Singapore Premier League	15	0	6	0	0	0	12 (Note: 2 in ASEAN Club Championship and 10 in AFC Champions League Two)	0	33	0
Lion City Sailors	2025–26	Singapore Premier League	15	2	3	0	1 (Note: 1 appearance in Community Shield)	0	7 (Note: 2 in ASEAN Club Championship and 5 in AFC Champions League Two)	0	26	2
Lion City Sailors	Total		30	2	9	0	1	0	25	0	65	2
Preah Khan Reach Svay Rieng	2026–27	Cambodian Premier League	3	0	1	0	0	0	2 (Note: 0 in ASEAN Club Championship and 2 in AFC Champions League Two)	0	6	0
Preah Khan Reach Svay Rieng	Total		3	0	1	0	0	0	2	0	6	0
Career Total			183	2	16	0	5	0	26	0	236	2

=== International ===
==== U20 International caps ====
No	Date	Venue	Opponent	Result	Competition
1	31 August 2017	Estádio Municipal de Abrantes, Portugal	Czech Republic	0-3 (lost)	2017–18 Under 20 Elite League
2	4 September 2017	Sportpark Middelmors, Netherlands	Netherlands	0-1 (lost)	2017–18 Under 20 Elite League
3	5 October 2017	Stade des Arbères, Switzerland	Switzerland	1-1 (draw)	2017–18 Under 20 Elite League
4	9 November 2017	Stadion Miejsk, Poland	Poland	2-1 (won)	2017–18 Under 20 Elite League
5	22 March 2018	Estádio Municipal Sérgio Conceição, Portugal	Germany	0-1 (lost)	2017–18 Under 20 Elite League
6	27 March 2018	Academy Stadium, England	England	0-3 (lost)	2017–18 Under 20 Elite League

==== U19 International caps ====
No	Date	Venue	Opponent	Result	Competition
1	6 October 2016	Estádio Municipal de Fátima, Portugal	Italy	1-2 (lost)	Friendly
2	9 October 2016	Municipal da Marinha Grande, Portugal	Italy	2-1 (won)	Friendly
3	15 November 2016	Stadion Beroe, Bulgaria	Denmark	2-1 (won)	2017 UEFA European Under-19 Championship qualification
4	23 March 2017	Estádio da Mata Real, Portugal	Croatia	2-1 (won)	2017 UEFA European Under-19 Championship qualification
5	28 March 2017	Estádio da Mata Real, Portugal	Poland	3-1 (won)	2017 UEFA European Under-19 Championship qualification
6	2 July 2017	Tengiz Burjanadze Stadium, Georgia	Georgia	1-0 (won)	2017 UEFA European Under-19 Championship
7	5 July 2017	David Petriashvili Stadium, Georgia	Czech Republic	2-1 (won)	2017 UEFA European Under-19 Championship
8	12 July 2017	David Petriashvili Stadium, Georgia	Netherlands	1-0 (won)	2017 UEFA European Under-19 Championship
9	15 July 2017	Tengiz Burjanadze Stadium, Georgia	England	1-2 (lost)	2017 UEFA European Under-19 Championship

== Honours ==
=== Club ===
==== Troyes ====
- Ligue 2: 2020–21

==== Lion City Sailors ====
- AFC Champions League Two runner-up: 2024–25
- Singapore Premier League: 2024–25
- Singapore Cup: 2023, 2024–25, 2025–26
- Singapore Community Shield: 2024; runner-up: 2025

=== Individual ===
- UEFA European Under-19 Championship Team of the Tournament: 2017
