= Igor Vekić =

Slovenian footballer (born 1998)

Personal information
- Date of birth: 6 May 1998 (age 28)
- Place of birth: Slovenia
- Height: 1.92 m (6 ft 4 in)
- Position: Goalkeeper

Team information
- Current team: Rijeka
- Number: 13

Youth career
- –2014: Triglav Kranj
- 2014–2017: Bravo

Senior career*
Years	Team	Apps	(Gls)
2016–2023	Bravo	102	(0)
2021–2022	→ Paços de Ferreira (loan)	1	(0)
2022–2023	→ Paços de Ferreira (loan)	10	(0)
2023–2026	Vejle	60	(0)
2026–	Rijeka	4	(0)

International career^{‡}
2013	Slovenia U15	1	(0)
2013	Slovenia U16	1	(0)
2014	Slovenia U17	4	(0)
2015–2016	Slovenia U18	5	(0)
2016	Slovenia U19	2	(0)
2020–2021	Slovenia U21	7	(0)
2024–	Slovenia	5	(0)
- * Club domestic league appearances and goals as of 22 September 2026 ‡ National team caps and goals as of 31 March 2026

Igor Vekić (born 6 May 1998) is a Slovenian professional footballer who plays as a goalkeeper for Croatian Football League club Rijeka.

== Club career ==
Vekić made his Slovenian PrvaLiga debut for Bravo on 9 August 2019 in a game against Aluminij.

In summer 2023, after spending two years on loan at Paços de Ferreira, Vekić signed a contract with Danish Superliga side Vejle Boldklub until 2026. On 6 September 2023, he debuted in the 2023–24 Danish Cup against Sønderjyske, keeping a clean sheet as Vejle advanced to the third round with a 1–0 victory. Vekić made his league debut in the last round of relegation play-off against Randers, ending in a 1–0 defeat for Vejle. On 28 May 2025, he extended his contract with Vejle Boldklub until 2027.

== International career ==
In January 2024, Vekić debuted for the Slovenia national team in a friendly match away against the United States.
