= Jeimes =

Brazilian footballer (born 2001)

Personal information
- Full name: Jeimes Menezes de Almeida
- Date of birth: 28 April 2001 (age 25)
- Place of birth: Brasília, Brazil
- Height: 1.88 m (6 ft 2 in)
- Position: Goalkeeper

Team information
- Current team: Sumgayit

Youth career
- 2009–2019: Santos
- 2019–2020: Paços de Ferreira

Senior career*
Years	Team	Apps	(Gls)
2020–2026	Paços de Ferreira	20	(0)
2020–2021	→ Montalegre (loan)	21	(0)
2022–2023	→ Montalegre (loan)	17	(0)
2026–	Sumgayit	0	(0)
- * Club domestic league appearances and goals as of 20 June 2026

Jeimes Menezes de Almeida (born 28 April 2001), known as just Jeimes, is a Brazilian professional footballer who plays as a goalkeeper for Azerbaijan Premier League club Sumgayit.

== Professional career ==
A youth product of the Brazilian club Santos, Jeimes moved to Portugal with Paços de Ferreira in 2019. He joined Montalegre on loan for the 2020–21 season. He signed his first professional contract with Paços de Ferreira on 21 July 2021. He made his professional debut with Paços de Ferreira in a 1-1 Primeira Liga tie with Boavista on 21 January 2022.

== Career statistics ==
=== Club ===
As of match played 1 September 2024

Appearances and goals by club, season and competition
Club	Season	League			National cup		Continental		Other		Total	
Club	Season	Division	Apps	Goals	Apps	Goals	Apps	Goals	Apps	Goals	Apps	Goals
Montalegre (loan)	2020-21	Campeonato de Portugal	21	0	1	0	—		—		22	0
Paços de Ferreira	2021-22	Primeira Liga	2	0	0	0	0	0	0	0	2	0
Paços de Ferreira	2022-23	Primeira Liga	0	0	—		—		—		0	0
Paços de Ferreira	2023-24	Liga Portugal 2	4	0	—		—		0	0	4	0
Paços de Ferreira	2024-25	Liga Portugal 2	0	0	—		—		—		0	0
Paços de Ferreira	Total		6	0	0	0	0	0	0	0	6	0
Montalegre (loan)	2022-23	Liga 3	17	0	1	0	—		—		18	0
Career Total			44	0	2	0	0	0	0	0	46	0
