= Adrián Butzke =

Spanish footballer (born 1999)

Personal information
- Full name: Adrián Butzke Benavides
- Date of birth: 30 March 1999 (age 27)
- Place of birth: Monachil, Spain
- Height: 1.93 m (6 ft 4 in)
- Position: Forward

Team information
- Current team: Marítimo
- Number: 3

Youth career
- 2007–2009: Atlético Monachil
- 2009–2018: Granada

Senior career*
Years	Team	Apps	(Gls)
2018–2019	Huétor Vega	32	(9)
2018–2022	Granada B	28	(5)
2020–2021	→ Haro (loan)	21	(2)
2021–2023	Granada	1	(0)
2022–2023	→ Paços Ferreira (loan)	39	(8)
2023–2025	Vitória Guimarães	17	(0)
2024–2025	→ Nacional (loan)	10	(0)
2025	→ Mirandés (loan)	14	(1)
2025–	Marítimo	28	(10)
- * Club domestic league appearances and goals as of 19 June 2026

Adrián Butzke Benavides (born 30 March 1999) is a Spanish professional footballer who plays as a forward for Primeira Liga club Marítimo.

== Club career ==
=== Granada ===
Born in Monachil, Province of Granada, Andalusia to a German father and a Spanish mother, Butzke joined Granada CF's academy from his hometown club. He began his senior with the farm team, CD Huétor Vega, in the Tercera División.

Butzke made his fourth-tier debut on 26 August 2018, starting a 0–2 home loss against Atlético Mancha Real. He first appeared with Granada's reserves on 2 September, coming on as a late substitute for Eliseo Falcón in a 0–1 Segunda División B home defeat to UCAM Murcia CF.

Butzke scored his first senior goal on 11 November 2018, Huétor Vega's second in a 4–3 away win over Martos CD. The following July, having netted nine times for them, he was definitely promoted to the B side.

On 29 June 2020, Butzke renewed his contract with Granada until 2022. On 4 September, he was loaned to fellow third-tier Haro Deportivo for the season.

Upon returning in July 2021, Butzke was again a member of Granada B, now in the Segunda División RFEF. He made his first-team debut on 30 November, scoring a hat-trick in a 7–0 away rout of amateurs CD Laguna de Tenerife in the first round of the Copa del Rey. He played his only La Liga match on 19 December, replacing scorer Jorge Molina in the 4–1 home victory against RCD Mallorca.

Butzke agreed to a new deal in January 2022, until June 2026. Shortly after, he was loaned to Primeira Liga club F.C. Paços de Ferreira.

=== Portugal and Mirandés ===
On 24 August 2022, after spending the entire pre-season with Granada, Butzke returned to Paços on a one-year loan. On 6 July 2023, Vitória de Guimarães announced his signing on a permanent three-year contract. He made 22 appearances during his spell at the latter, failing to find the net or provide an assist.

Still owned by Vitória, Butzke split the 2024–25 campaign with C.D. Nacional (Portuguese top flight) and CD Mirandés (Segunda División). On 1 September 2025, he joined Liga Portugal 2's C.S. Marítimo on a one-year deal.

== Honours ==
Marítimo

- Liga Portugal 2: 2025–26
