= Luís Bastos =

Portuguese footballer

Personal information
- Full name: Luís Pedro Alves Bastos
- Date of birth: 10 September 2001 (age 25)
- Place of birth: Paços de Ferreira, Portugal
- Height: 1.75 m (5 ft 9 in)
- Position: Left-back

Team information
- Current team: Oliveirense
- Number: 55

Youth career
- 2009–2010: Paços de Ferreira
- 2010–2015: Porto
- 2015–2020: Paços de Ferreira

Senior career*
Years	Team	Apps	(Gls)
2020–2024	Paços de Ferreira	21	(1)
2020–2021	→ Felgueiras (loan)	23	(4)
2024–	Oliveirense	46	(3)
- * Club domestic league appearances and goals as of 20 June 2026

Luís Pedro Alves Bastos (born 10 September 2001) is a Portuguese professional footballer who plays as a left-back for Liga 3 club Oliveirense.

== Professional career ==
Bastos signed his first professional contract with Paços de Ferreira on 23 August 2020. He spent the 2020–21 season on loan with Felgueiras, before returning to the senior team of Paços de Ferreira. He made his professional debut with Paços de Ferreira in a 2-1 Taça da Liga loss to Boavista on 23 September 2021.
