= Flávio Ramos (footballer, born 1994) =

Brazilian footballer

Personal information
- Full name: Flávio da Silva Ramos
- Date of birth: 12 May 1994 (age 32)
- Place of birth: Santa Maria da Boa Vista, Brazil
- Height: 1.91 m (6 ft 3 in)
- Position: Centre-back

Senior career*
Years	Team	Apps	(Gls)
2013–2016	Náutico	45	(0)
2016–2021	Feirense	63	(2)
2019–2020	→ Gençlerbirliği (loan)	26	(0)
2021–2023	Paços de Ferreira	18	(0)
- * Club domestic league appearances and goals as of 00:30, 20 October 2023 (UTC)

Flávio da Silva Ramos (born 12 May 1994) is a Brazilian professional footballer who plays as a centre-back. Currently a free agent, he most recently played for Portuguese club Paços de Ferreira.

== Club career ==
On 14 July 2021, Ramos signed a two-year contract with Paços de Ferreira.
