= José Oliveira (footballer, born 2002) =

Portuguese footballer

Personal information
- Full name: José Pedro Ferreira Oliveira
- Date of birth: 6 April 2002 (age 24)
- Place of birth: Penafiel, Portugal
- Height: 1.86 m (6 ft 1 in)
- Position: Goalkeeper

Team information
- Current team: Rebordosa (on loan from Paços Ferreira)
- Number: 30

Youth career
- 2010–2015: AD Várzea
- 2015–2020: Paços Ferreira

Senior career*
Years	Team	Apps	(Gls)
2020–	Paços Ferreira	7	(0)
2021–2022	→ Sanjoanense (loan)	5	(0)
2025	→ Salgueiros (loan)	0	(0)
2026	→ Aparecida (loan)	11	(0)
2026–	→ Rebordosa (loan)	0	(0)

International career
2019–2020	Portugal U18	4	(0)
2021–2022	Portugal U20	3	(0)
- * Club domestic league appearances and goals as of 6 September 2026

José Pedro Ferreira Oliveira (born 6 April 2002) is a Portuguese professional footballer who plays as a goalkeeper for Campeonato de Portugal club Rebordosa on loan from Paços de Ferreira.

== Club career ==
Born in Penafiel, Porto District, Oliveira joined F.C. Paços de Ferreira's academy at the age of 13. He made his competitive and Primeira Liga debut with the first team on 24 July 2020, playing one minute as a substitute in a 3–3 away draw against Gil Vicente F.C. which was the last match of the season.

Oliveira was loaned to third division club A.D. Sanjoanense on 10 September 2021. He served another loan in the first part of the 2025–26 campaign, now to S.C. Salgueiros of the fourth tier.

== Career statistics ==
As of 24 July 2020

Club	Season	League			Cup		Other		Total	
Club	Season	Division	Apps	Goals	Apps	Goals	Apps	Goals	Apps	Goals
Paços Ferreira	2019–20	Primeira Liga	1	0	0	0	0	0	1	0
Career total			1	0	0	0	0	0	1	0
