= Zé Uilton =

Brazilian footballer

Personal information
- Full name: José Uilton Silva de Jesus
- Date of birth: 25 July 1992 (age 34)
- Place of birth: Itapitanga, Brazil
- Height: 1.75 m (5 ft 9 in)
- Position: Right winger

Youth career
- 2009–2013: União Suzano

Senior career*
Years	Team	Apps	(Gls)
2013–2015	Novorizontino	5	(0)
2014–2015	→ Trindade (loan)	17	(1)
2015–2016	Anapolina	12	(0)
2016–2017	CRAC	9	(0)
2017–2018	Grêmio Anápolis	14	(2)
2018–2025	Paços de Ferreira	185	(13)
2025	Al-Arabi		
- * Club domestic league appearances and goals as of 12 January 2025

José Uilton Silva de Jesus (born 25 July 1992), better known as Zé Uilton or just Uilton, is a Brazilian professional footballer who plays as a right winger.

== Career ==
Uilton made his debut for Paços de Ferreira in a 2-0 LigaPro win over S.C. Braga B on 12 August 2018.

== Career statistics ==
As of match played 1 September 2024

Appearances and goals by club, season and competition
Club	Season	League			State League		National cup		Continental		Other		Total	
Club	Season	Division	Apps	Goals	Apps	Goals	Apps	Goals	Apps	Goals	Apps	Goals	Apps	Goals
Novorizontino	2013	—			5 (Note: Appearance(s) in Campeonato Paulista Série A3)	0	—		—		—		5	0
Trindade (loan)	2014	—			8 (Note: Appearance(s) in Campeonato Goiano Primeira Divisão)	1	—		—		—		8	1
Trindade (loan)	2015	—			9	0	—		—		—		9	0
Trindade (loan)	Total		—		17	1	—		—		—		17	1
Anapolina	2016	—			12	0	—		—		—		12	0
CRAC	2017	—			9	0	—		—		—		9	0
Grêmio Anápolis	2018	—			14	2	—		—		—		14	2
Paços de Ferreira	2018-19	LigaPro	19	2	—		2	0	—		3 (Note: Appearance(s) in Taça da Liga)	1	24	3
Paços de Ferreira	2019-20	Primeira Liga	26	2	—		3	0	—		4	0	33	2
Paços de Ferreira	2020-21	Primeira Liga	33	2	—		2	0	—		1	0	36	2
Paços de Ferreira	2021-22	Primeira Liga	33	1	—		2	1	4 (Note: Appearance(s) in UEFA Europa Conference League)	1	3	0	42	3
Paços de Ferreira	2022-23	Primeira Liga	29	1	—		1	0	—		2	0	32	1
Paços de Ferreira	2023-24	Liga Portugal 2	28	3	—		—		—		1	0	29	3
Paços de Ferreira	2024-25	Liga Portugal 2	4	0	—		—		—		—		4	0
Paços de Ferreira	Total		172	11	—		10	1	4	1	14	1	200	14
Career total			172	11	57	3	10	1	4	1	14	1	257	17
