= Luíz Carlos (footballer, born 1985) =

Brazilian footballer

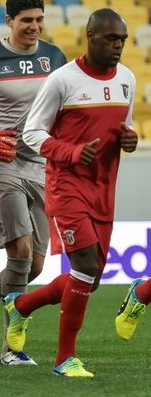
- Luíz Carlos with Braga

Personal information
- Full name: Luíz Carlos Martins Moreira
- Date of birth: 5 July 1985 (age 41)
- Place of birth: Espírito Santo, Brazil
- Height: 1.75 m (5 ft 9 in)
- Position: Midfielder

Senior career*
Years	Team	Apps	(Gls)
2008	São Cristóvão		
2009	Ipitanga	5	(0)
2009–2011	Freamunde	51	(1)
2011–2013	Paços de Ferreira	55	(3)
2013–2016	Braga	72	(1)
2014	Braga B	2	(0)
2016–2017	Al-Ahli	13	(0)
2017–2018	Osmanlıspor	21	(0)
2018–2024	Paços de Ferreira	173	(4)
- * Club domestic league appearances and goals as of 20 June 2024

Luíz Carlos Martins Moreira (born 5 July 1985), simply known as Luíz Carlos, is a Brazilian professional footballer who plays as a midfielder.

== Career ==
In the summer of 2016, Luíz Carlos signed for Al-Ahli Saudi FC.

== Honours ==
Braga

- Taça de Portugal: 2015–16

Al-Ahli

- Saudi Super Cup: 2016

Paços de Ferreira

- LigaPro: 2018–19

Individual

- LigaPro Best Player of the Season: 2018–19
