= Maracás (footballer) =

Brazilian footballer

Personal information
- Date of birth: 27 April 1994 (age 32)
- Place of birth: Itiruçu, Brazil
- Height: 1.84 m (6 ft 0 in)
- Position: Centre-back

Team information
- Current team: Moreirense
- Number: 26

Youth career
- 2012–2014: Bahia
- 2014–2015: Vitória

Senior career*
Years	Team	Apps	(Gls)
2015–2016	Vitória	6	(0)
2016–2017	América de Natal	20	(1)
2017–2019	Sampaio Corrêa	64	(5)
2019	→ Oeste (loan)	22	(0)
2019–2022	Paços de Ferreira	73	(2)
2022–2023	Al-Wahda	3	(0)
2023	→ Paços de Ferreira (loan)	17	(0)
2023–	Moreirense	87	(8)
- * Club domestic league appearances and goals as of 25 May 2026

Jóbson de Brito Gonzaga (born 27 April 1994), better known as Maracás, is a Brazilian professional footballer who plays as a centre-back for Primeira Liga club Moreirense.

== Career ==
Maracás made his professional debut with Vitória in a 2–0 Campeonato Brasileiro Série B loss to Sampaio Corrêa on 8 May 2015. On 14 June 2019, signed with Paços de Ferreira in the Portuguese Primeira Liga.
