= Estádio Capital do Móvel =

Stadium in Paços de Ferreira, Portugal

Capital do Móvel
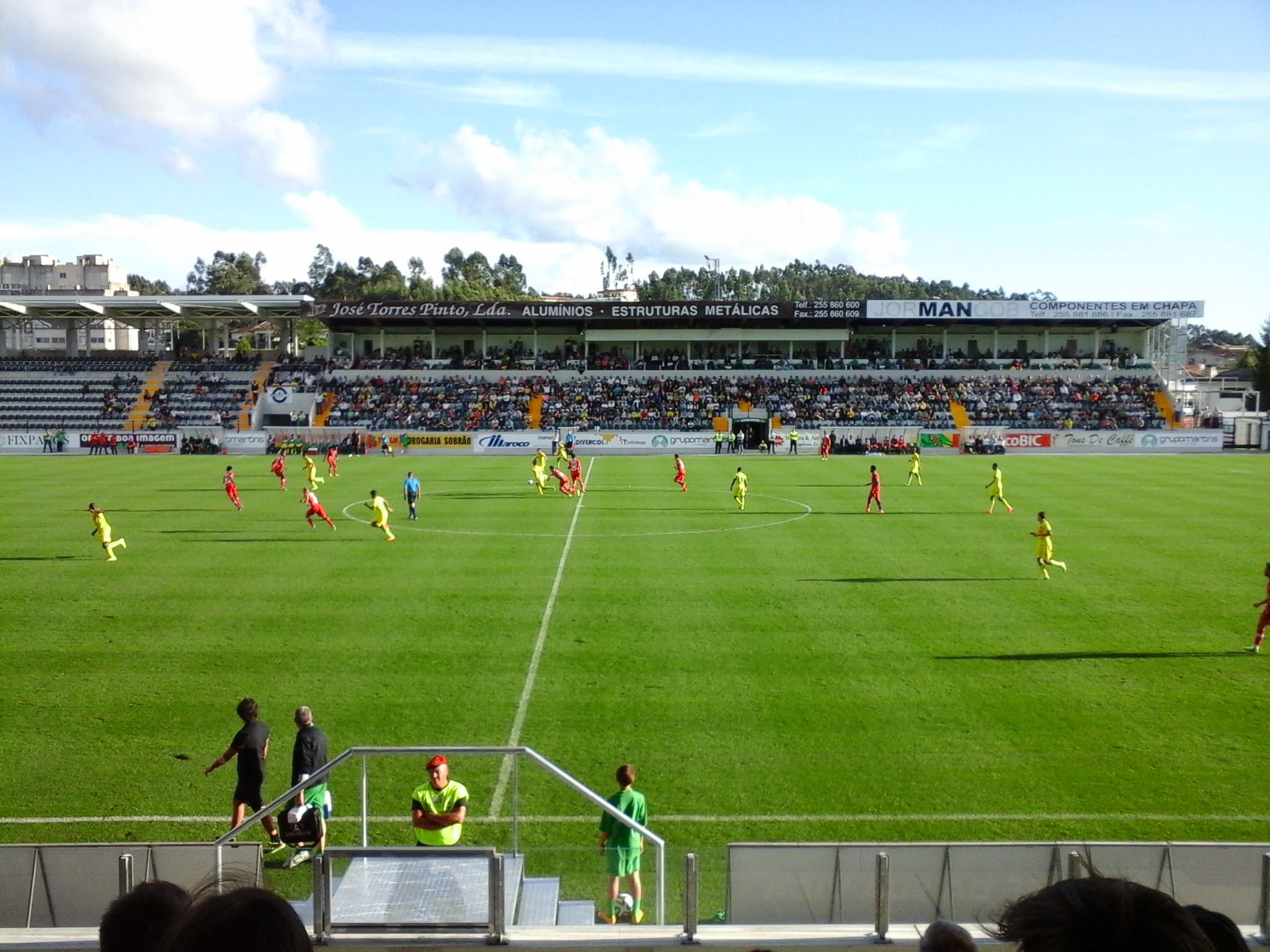
- UEFA
- Interactive map of Capital do Móvel
- Full name: Estádio Capital do Móvel
- Former names: Estádio da Mata Real
- Location: Paços de Ferreira, Portugal
- Coordinates: 41°16′17″N 8°23′7″W
- Owner: Paços de Ferreira
- Capacity: 9,076
- Surface: Grass
- Record attendance: 9,076 (18 March 2017); F.C. Paços de Ferreira 0–0 S.L. Benfica
- Field size: 105 x 68 m

Construction
- Built: 1973
- Opened: 7 October 1973
- Renovated: 2000; 2013; 2017

Tenant
- Paços de Ferreira

The Estádio Capital do Móvel is a multi-use stadium in Paços de Ferreira, Portugal. It is used primarily for football matches. The stadium is able to hold 9,076 people and was built in 1973 under the name Estádio da Mata Real.

The stadium was renovated twice between 2000 and 2013, with the capacity increasing from the original 5,250 to 7,000 seats. In 2017, the new north stand was inaugurated, increasing the stadium's capacity to the current 9,076 seats.

== See also ==
- List of football stadiums in Portugal
