= 2022–23 Belenenses SAD season =

B-SAD
2022–23 season
- President: Rui Pedro Soares
- Head coach: Franclim Carvalho
- Stadium: Benfica Campus
- Liga Portugal 2: 16th
- Taça de Portugal: Quarter-finals
- Taça da Liga: Group stage

The 2022–23 season was the fifth season in the history of B-SAD and their first season back in the second division of Portuguese football. The club participated in the Liga Portugal 2, the Taça de Portugal, and the Taça da Liga. The season covered the period from 1 July 2022 to 30 June 2023.

== Players ==
As of 3 February 2023

Note: Flags indicate national team as defined under FIFA eligibility rules; some limited exceptions apply. Players may hold more than one non-FIFA nationality.

No.	Pos.	Nation	Player
1	GK	POR	Gonçalo Tabuaço
4	DF	POR	Nuno Tomás
5	DF	BRA	Henrique
6	MF	POR	Braima Sambú
7	MF	POR	Chico Teixeira
8	MF	RSA	Sphephelo Sithole
10	FW	USA	Brian Saramago
11	FW	BRA	Jefferson
12	DF	NGR	Kelechi John
16	MF	POR	Rúben Oliveira (on loan from Santa Clara)
17	FW	POR	Diogo Tavares
19	MF	POR	Tomás Castro
21	MF	GUI	Boubacar Fofana

No.	Pos.	Nation	Player
22	DF	POR	Martim Coxixo
23	FW	POR	Edgar Pacheco
24	DF	POR	Bernardo Caldeira
28	MF	POR	Samuel Lobato (on loan from Famalicão)
35	FW	CPV	Tiago Lopes
40	MF	BRA	Ageu (on loan from Santa Clara)
42	MF	POR	António Montez
44	DF	BFA	Trova Boni
77	DF	CPV	Jójó
84	FW	BRA	Fabrício Simões
89	FW	BRA	João Marcos (on loan from Santa Clara)
90	GK	CPV	Dylan Silva
99	GK	POR	Álvaro Ramalho

=== Out on loan ===
Note: Flags indicate national team as defined under FIFA eligibility rules; some limited exceptions apply. Players may hold more than one non-FIFA nationality.

No. / Pos. / Nation / Player; — / FW / POR / Kikas (at Estrela until 30 June 2023)	No. / Pos. / Nation / Player; — / FW / SEN / Alioune Ndour (at Châteauroux until 30 June 2023)

== Pre-season and friendlies ==
Win Draw Loss

== Competitions ==
=== Overall record ===
Competition	First match	Last match	Starting round	Final position	Record							
Competition	First match	Last match	Starting round	Final position	Pld	W	D	L	GF	GA	GD	Win %
Liga Portugal 2	6 August 2022	28 May 2023	Matchday 1	16th	34	9	8	17	41	59	−18	26.47
Taça de Portugal	1 October 2022	8 February 2023	Second round	Quarter-finals	5	4	0	1	14	5	+9	80.00
Taça da Liga	8 November 2022	11 December 2022	Group stage	Group stage	3	0	2	1	4	5	−1	0.00
Total					42	13	10	19	59	69	−10	30.95

Source: Soccerway

=== Liga Portugal 2 ===
==== League table ====
Pos	Team	Pld	W	D	L	GF	GA	GD	Pts	Promotion or relegation
14	Benfica B (I)	34	10	8	16	52	58	−6	38 (Note: Benfica B are ahead of Leixões on head-to-head points: Benfica B 2–1 Leixões, Leixões 1–1 Benfica B. Leixões were deducted 1 point for financial irregularities.)	
15	Leixões	34	10	9	15	38	49	−11	38	
16	B-SAD (R)	34	9	8	17	41	59	−18	35	Qualification to Relegation play-offs
17	Trofense (R)	34	8	8	18	31	51	−20	32	Relegation to Liga 3
18	Sporting da Covilhã (R)	34	7	7	20	31	57	−26	28	Relegation to Liga 3

Updated to match(es) played on 28 May 2023. Source: Liga Portugal 2
Rules for classification: 1) Points; 2) Head-to-head points; 3) Head-to-head goal difference; 4) Head-to-head away goals scored; 5) Goal difference; 6) Matches won; 7) Goals scored; 8) Play-off.
(I) Ineligible for promotion; (R) Relegated

==== Results summary ====
Overall								Home						Away					
Pld	W	D	L	GF	GA	GD	Pts	W	D	L	GF	GA	GD	W	D	L	GF	GA	GD
31	8	6	17	36	55	−19	30	1	4	10	15	29	−14	7	2	7	21	26	−5

Last updated: 5 May 2023.
Source: Liga Portugal

==== Results by round ====
Round	1	2	3	4	5	6	7	8	9	10	11	12	13	14	15	16	17	18	19	20	21	22	23	24	25	26	27	28	29	30	31	32	33	34
Ground	A	H	A	H	A	H	A	H	A	H	A	H	A	H	A	A	H	H	A	H	A	H	A	H	A	H	A	H	A	H	A	H	H	A
Result	L	L	D	L	W	D	L	L	W	L	L	L	D	W	W	L	L	D	W	D	L	L	W	L	L	L	W	D	L	L	W			
Position	13	17	17	17	13	13	15	17	13	15	16	16	16	16	15	15	16	16	16	16	16	16	16	16	16	16	16	16	16	16	16			

Updated to match(es) played on 5 May 2023. Source: Liga Portugal
A = Away; H = Home; W = Win; D = Draw; L = Loss

==== Matches ====
The league fixtures were announced on 5 July 2022.

6 August 2022 1	Trofense	3–2	B-SAD	Trofa
15:30	Tiago André (yellow card) 25'; Beni Mukendi (yellow card) 48'; Bruno Almeida 65' 90+5'; Caio Marcelo (yellow card) 74'; Okitokandjo 76' (yellow card) 83'	Report	Sithole (yellow card) 10'; Edgar Pacheco 35'; Nego Tembeng (yellow card) 37' (yellow-red card) 39'; Luís Mota 88'; Danny Henriques (yellow card) 90+6'	Stadium: Estádio do CD Trofense; Attendance: 666; Referee: (Portugal) Flavio Lima

14 August 2022 2	B-SAD	2–3	Porto B	Seixal
15:30	Francisco Teixeira (yellow card) 22'; Alisson Safira 34' (pen.); Tomás Castro (yellow card) 54'; Ndour (yellow card) 56'; Sithole (yellow card) 86'; Jójó 89'	Report	Marcus 10' (yellow card) 32'; Vasco Sousa (yellow card) 13'; Wendel (yellow card) 53' (goal) 58' 78' (pen.)	Stadium: Caixa Futebol Campus; Attendance: 315; Referee: (Portugal) João Pinho

22 August 2022 3	Penafiel	3–3	B-SAD	Penafiel
18:00	Gonçalo Loureiro (yellow card) 20' (yellow-red card) 20'; Feliz Vaz (yellow card) 38' (goal) 56'; Edi Semedo (yellow card) 41' (goal) 75'; Roberto 70'	Report	Alisson Safira 5' 45'; Francisco Teixeira (yellow card) 45+3'; Tomás Castro 51' (yellow card) 87'; Edgar Pacheco (yellow card) 84'; Kikas (yellow card) 90+2'	Stadium: Estádio Municipal 25 de Abril; Attendance: 456; Referee: (Portugal) Carlos Macedo

27 August 2022 4	B-SAD	2–3	Moreirense	Oeiras
14:00	Jefferson (red card) 24'; Alisson Safira (yellow card) 48'; Sithole (yellow card) 74'; Kikas 89' 90+2'	Report	André Luis (yellow card) 12' (goal) 80' (pen.); Gonçalo Franco 13'; Hugo Gomes (yellow card) 25'; Luís Rocha (yellow card) 25'; Platiny 86'	Stadium: Estádio Nacional; Attendance: 362; Referee: (Portugal) João Ferreira

4 September 2022 5	Nacional	1–3	B-SAD	Funchal
15:30	Danilović 9'; João Aurélio (red card) 23'; Rafael Vieira (yellow card) 40'; Gustavo Silva (yellow card) 66'	Report	Nuno Tomás (yellow card) 32'; Tomás Castro 42'; Rúben Oliveira (yellow card) 44'; Jójó (yellow card) 45+1'; Braima Sambú (yellow card) 60'; Edgar Pacheco 62'; Patrick (yellow card) 74' (goal) 90+4'	Stadium: Estádio da Madeira; Attendance: 802; Referee: (Portugal) Manuel Mota

11 September 2022 6	B-SAD	1–1	Feirense	Oeiras
11:00	Patrick (yellow card) 31'; Danny Henriques (yellow card) 50'; Kikas 62'	Report	Oche Ochowechi 27'; Washington (yellow card) 36'; Tiago Dias (yellow card) 70'; João Pinto (yellow card) 90'; André Rodrigues (yellow card) 90+2'	Stadium: Estádio Nacional; Attendance: 248; Referee: (Portugal) André Narciso

16 September 2022 7	Tondela	3–1	B-SAD	Tondela
18:00	Rafael Barbosa 1'; Marcelo Alves (yellow card) 7'; Tiago Almeida (yellow card) 15'; Daniel dos Anjos 25' (pen.); Khacef (yellow card) 45+2'; Cuba 89'; Rafael Alcobia (yellow card) 89'	Report	Nuno Tomás (yellow card) 31'; Henrique (yellow card) 58'; Braima Sambú 64'; Rúben Oliveira (yellow card) 68'; Nego Tembeng (yellow card) 84'	Stadium: Estádio João Cardoso; Attendance: 1,336; Referee: (Portugal) Marcos Brazão

7 October 2022 8	B-SAD	2–3	Farense	Oeiras
18:00	Kikas 7'; Edgar Pacheco 10' (yellow card) 22'; Rúben Oliveira (yellow card) 19'; Diogo Tavares (yellow card) 27'; Nego Tembeng (yellow card) 30'; Francisco Teixeira (yellow card) 70'	Report	Rui Costa 30' (pen.); Marco Matias (yellow card) 64' (goal) 83'; Cristian Ponde 69'; Ricardo Velho (yellow card) 89'	Stadium: Estádio Nacional; Attendance: 401; Referee: (Portugal) Anzhony Rodrigues

18 October 2022 9	Torreense	0–1	B-SAD	Torres Vedras
18:00	João Afonso (yellow card) 52'; Mateus (yellow card) 71'	Report	Kikas 26'; Boni (yellow card) 59'; Braima Sambú (yellow card) 84'; Patrick (yellow card) 90+6'	Stadium: Estádio Manuel Marques; Attendance: 428; Referee: (Portugal) Luis Godinho

22 October 2022 10	B-SAD	0–2	Benfica B	Oeiras
20:30	Kikas (yellow card) 13'; Boni (yellow card) 17'; Nuno Tomás (yellow card) 69' (yellow-red card) 83'; Jefferson (yellow card) 88'; Patrick (yellow card) 89'; Danny Henriques (yellow card) 90+2'	Report	Henrique Pereira (yellow card) 40'; Paulo Bernardo (yellow card) 45+1'; Filipe Cruz 73'; Pedro Santos 90'; Tiago Cóser (yellow card) 90+3'	Stadium: Estádio Nacional; Attendance: 428; Referee: (Portugal) Hugo Silva

30 October 2022 11	Académico de Viseu	2–1	B-SAD	Viseu
11:00	Arthur Chaves (yellow card) 8'; André Clóvis 21'; Messeguem (yellow card) 24'; Ricardo Ramírez (yellow card) 84'; Yuri 88'	Report	Diogo Tavares (yellow card) 67'; Patrick (yellow card) 71'; Jefferson 73' (yellow card) 85'	Stadium: Estádio do Fontelo; Attendance: 1,003; Referee: (Portugal) Cláudio Pereira

6 November 2022 12	B-SAD	1–3	Estrela	Oeiras
15:30	Nego Tembeng (yellow card) 21'; Nuno Tomás 56'; Jefferson (yellow card) 60'; Braima Sambú (yellow card) 71'; Edgar Pacheco (yellow card) 82'	Report	Gustavo Henrique 22'; Omurwa (yellow card) 26'; João Silva 62'; Rui Correia (yellow card) 76'; Paulinho 79'	Stadium: Estádio Nacional; Attendance: 492; Referee: (Portugal) Bruno Vieira

13 November 2022 13	Sporting da Covilhã	1–1	B-SAD	Covilhã
14:00	Nuno Rodrigues (yellow card) 29'; Jorginho (yellow card) 41'; Jaime (yellow card) 56' (goal) 90+3'; Fatai (yellow card) 90'	Report	Rúben Oliveira 38' (yellow card) 72'; Diogo Tavares (yellow card) 75'	Stadium: Estádio Municipal José dos Santos Pinto; Attendance: 395; Referee: (Portugal) Ricardo Baixinho

29 December 2022 14	B-SAD	2–0	Leixões	Oeiras
17:00	Tomás Castro 13'; Francisco Teixeira 53' (yellow card) 66'; Boni (yellow card) 60'	Report	Oliveira (yellow card) 40'; Thalis (yellow card) 50'	Stadium: Estádio Nacional; Attendance: 256; Referee: (Portugal) Cláudio Pereira

7 January 2023 15	Mafra	0–1	B-SAD	Mafra
15:30	Leandrinho (yellow card) 42'; Lucas Rodrigues (yellow card) 82'; Pité (yellow card) 90+3'	Report	Kikas 22'; Francisco Teixeira (yellow card) 52'; Nuno Tomás (yellow card) 78'; Boni (yellow card) 82'	Stadium: Estádio Municipal de Mafra; Attendance: 466; Referee: (Portugal) Diogo Rosa

15 January 2023 16	Oliveirense	2–1	B-SAD	Oliveira de Azeméis
18:00	Maga (yellow card) 18'; Michel 68'; Jaime (yellow card) 76'; Volnei Feltes (yellow card) 86'; Zé Leite 90'	Report	Boni (yellow card) 73'; Edgar Pacheco 78'; Samuel Lobato (yellow card) 81' (yellow-red card) 90+4'	Stadium: Estádio Carlos Osório; Attendance: 302; Referee: (Portugal) Bruno José Costa

21 January 2023 17	B-SAD	0-3	Vilafranquense	Oeiras
12:45	Tiago Lopes (yellow card) 50'; Henrique (yellow card) 58'; Kikas (yellow card) 75'	Report	Luís Silva 9'; Belkheir 44' (yellow card) 54'; André Ceitil (yellow card) 46'; Nenê (yellow card) 53'; Veiga (yellow card) 62'; Baldé (yellow card) 90+1'	Stadium: Estádio Nacional; Attendance: 263; Referee: (Portugal) Marcos Brazão

30 January 2023 18	B-SAD	1–1	Trofense	Oeiras
18:00	Henrique 58'; Jójó (yellow card) 86'	Report	Pachu (yellow card) 42'; Djalma 48' (pen.); Hélder Morim (yellow card) 52'; Tiago Manso (yellow card) 55'; Issoufi Maïga (yellow card) 73'; Tiago Ferreira (yellow card) 81'	Stadium: Estádio Nacional; Attendance: 166; Referee: (Portugal) João Afonso

4 February 2023 19	Porto B	1–2	B-SAD	Vila Nova de Gaia
15:30	Bruno Costa 24' (pen.); Wendel (yellow card) 43'; Romain Correia (yellow card) 73'; Rui Monteiro (yellow card) 85'	Report	Edgar Pacheco 13'; Samuel Lobato (yellow card) 54'; Henrique 75' (pen.); Rúben Oliveira (yellow card) 82'; Tomás Castro (yellow card) 89'; Fofana (yellow card) 90+1'	Stadium: Estádio Luís Filipe Menezes; Attendance: 328; Referee: (Portugal) Carlos Macedo

=== Taça de Portugal ===
1 October 2022 Round 2	Joane	0–3	B-SAD	Joane
15:00		Report	Kikas 20' (pen.) 66'; Lopes 35'	Stadium: Estádio de Barreiros; Referee: (Portugal) Manuel Oliveira

14 October 2022 Round 3	Olhanense	0–2	B-SAD	Olhão
15:00	Tiago Maia (yellow card) 23'; Jair Brito (yellow card) 25'; Fredrick Agyemang (yellow card) 75'; Edson Pires (yellow card) 84'	Report	Jefferson 15' (yellow card) 43'; Tiago Lopes 52'; Tomás Castro (yellow card) 63'; Rúben Oliveira (yellow card) 84'	Stadium: Estádio José Arcanjo; Referee: (Portugal) Pedro Ramalho

10 November 2022 Round 4	B-SAD	4–0	Machico	Oeiras
11:00	Jefferson 2'; Tiago Lopes 17'; Martim Coxixo 23' (pen.); Boni 55'	Report	João Neri (yellow card) 84'	Stadium: Estádio Nacional; Referee: (Portugal) Hélder Carvalho

11 January 2023 Round 5	Vilaverdense	1–4	B-SAD	Vila Verde
14:00	David Martins (yellow card) 22'; Brian Cipenga (yellow card) 33'; Kikas 66' (o.g.); Joyce Ossa (yellow card) 78'	Report	Tiago Lopes 1'; Braima Sambú (yellow card) 17'; Jefferson 20'; Tomás Castro (yellow card) 77'; Kikas 78' (pen.); Edgar Pacheco 90+5'	Stadium: Campo Cruz do Reguengo; Referee: (Portugal) Fábio Veríssimo

8 February 2023 Quarterfinals	Famalicão	4–1	B-SAD	Vila Nova de Famalicão
18:45	Dobre 37'; Cádiz 57', 59'; Jaime 68'	Report	Oliveira 65'	Stadium: Estádio Municipal 22 de Junho; Referee: João Gonçalves

=== Taça da Liga ===
Pos	Team	Pld	W	D	L	GF	GA	GD	Pts	
1	Boavista	3	2	1	0	4	2	+2	7	Advance to the quarter-finals
2	Vitória de Guimarães	3	0	3	0	2	2	0	3	
3	B-SAD	3	0	2	1	4	5	−1	2	
4	Vilafranquense	3	0	2	1	0	1	−1	2	

Source: Soccerway

18 November 2022 1	B-SAD	2–3	Boavista	Oeiras
20:30	Edgar Pacheco 20'; Brian Saramago 24'	Report	Mangas 37'; Gorré 50'; Lourenço 58'	Stadium: Estádio Nacional; Attendance: 161; Referee: (Portugal) João Gonçalves

1 December 2022 2	Vitória de Guimarães	2–2	B-SAD	Guimarães
20:45	Anderson Silva 14'; Tiago Silva (yellow card) 33'; Jota Silva 36'; Janvier (yellow card) 62'	Report	Danny Henriques 29' (yellow card) 35'; Francisco Teixeira 45' (yellow card) 53'; Kikas (yellow card) 63'; Rúben Oliveira (yellow card) 72'; Nego Tembeng (yellow card) 87'; Henrique (yellow card) 88'; Gonçalo Tabuaço (yellow card) 90+6'	Stadium: Estádio D. Afonso Henriques; Attendance: 6,520; Referee: (Portugal) Vítor Ferreira

11 December 2022 3	Vilafranquense	0–0	B-SAD	Rio Maior
11:00	Léo Alaba (yellow card) 57'; Bernardo Martins (yellow card) 90'	Report	Braima Sambú (yellow card) 88'; Nego Tembeng (red card) 88'; Álvaro Ramalho (yellow card) 90+4'	Stadium: Estádio Municipal de Rio Maior; Attendance: 27; Referee: (Portugal) Hugo Silva
