= 2022–23 Académico de Viseu F.C. season =

Académico de Viseu F.C.
2022–23 season
- Chairman: Mariano Maroto Lopez
- Manager: Pedro Ribeiro
- Stadium: Estádio do Fontelo
- Liga Portugal 2: 4th
- Taça de Portugal: Quarter-finals
- Taça da Liga: Semi-finals
- Top goalscorer: League: André Clóvis (28); All: André Clóvis (30)
colours	Away colours	Third colours

The 2022–23 season is the 109th season in the history of Académico de Viseu F.C. and their ninth consecutive season in the second division of Portuguese football. The club are participating in the Liga Portugal 2, the Taça de Portugal, and the Taça da Liga. The season covers the period from 1 July 2022 to 30 June 2023.

== Players ==
As of 6 January 2023

Note: Flags indicate national team as defined under FIFA eligibility rules; some limited exceptions apply. Players may hold more than one non-FIFA nationality.

No.	Pos.	Nation	Player
1	GK	POR	Ricardo Janota
2	DF	BRA	Ícaro
4	DF	POR	André Almeida
5	DF	BRA	Arthur Chaves
6	MF	GER	Soufiane Messeguem
7	FW	BRA	Yuri
8	MF	HON	Jonathan Toro
9	FW	AUT	Daniel Nussbaumer
10	MF	GBS	Famana Quizera
11	FW	FRA	Gautier Ott
12	FW	ARG	Ricardo Ramírez (on loan from Atlético San Telmo)
13	MF	POR	Capela
14	DF	BRA	Kauã Oliveira
21	DF	BRA	Kayque
22	DF	BDI	Christophe Nduwarugira

No.	Pos.	Nation	Player
25	DF	POR	Rafael Bandeira
27	MF	ESP	Javier Currás
28	DF	POR	Tiago Mesquita
30	FW	FRA	Daniel Labila (on loan from 1899 Hoffenheim)
33	FW	BRA	André Clóvis
51	GK	SEN	Mouhamed Mbaye
55	MF	POR	Tomás Silva
66	DF	BRA	Igor Milioransa
73	MF	GER	Roberto Massimo (on loan from Stuttgart)
75	GK	SLO	Domen Gril
77	FW	POR	Luisinho
88	MF	ANG	Paná
90	DF	POR	Vítor Bruno
99	GK	POR	João Monteiro

== Pre-season and friendlies ==
Win Draw Loss Fixtures

13 July 2022 Friendly	Chaves (Portugal)	1–1	(Portugal) Académico de Viseu	Chaves
10:30 WEST (UTC+1)				Stadium: Estádio Municipal Eng. Manuel Branco Teixeira

20 July 2022 Friendly	Académico de Viseu (Portugal)	0–2	(Portugal) São João de Ver	Viseu
10:00 WEST (UTC+1)				Stadium: Estádio do Fontelo

23 July 2022 Friendly	Vizela (Portugal)	0–1	(Portugal) Académico de Viseu	Praia de Quiaios
10:30 WEST (UTC+1)			Clóvis	Stadium: Centro de Estágio Rosa Náutica

30 July 2022 Friendly	Rio Ave (Portugal)	1–0	(Portugal) Académico de Viseu	Vila do Conde
18:00 WEST (UTC+1)	Clóvis 54' (o.g.)			Stadium: Estádio dos Arcos; Referee: Bruno Costa

== Competitions ==
=== Overall record ===
Competition	First match	Last match	Starting round	Final position	Record							
Competition	First match	Last match	Starting round	Final position	Pld	W	D	L	GF	GA	GD	Win %
Liga Portugal 2	6 August 2022	28 May 2023	Matchday 1	4th	34	14	11	9	51	45	+6	41.18
Taça de Portugal	2 October 2022	8 February 2023	Second round	Quarter-finals	5	4	0	1	12	3	+9	80.00
Taça da Liga	20 November 2022	25 January 2023	Group stage	Semi-finals	6	3	2	1	11	9	+2	50.00
Total					45	21	13	11	74	57	+17	46.67

Source: Soccerway

=== Liga Portugal 2 ===
==== League table ====
Pos	Team	Pld	W	D	L	GF	GA	GD	Pts	Promotion or relegation
2	Farense (P)	34	21	6	7	57	34	+23	69	Promotion to Primeira Liga
3	Estrela da Amadora (O, P)	34	16	15	3	55	35	+20	63	Qualification to Promotion play-offs
4	Académico de Viseu	34	14	11	9	51	45	+6	53	
5	Porto B (I)	34	14	9	11	48	40	+8	51	
6	Mafra	34	12	11	11	46	49	−3	47	

Updated to match(es) played on 28 May 2023. Source: Liga Portugal 2
Rules for classification: 1) Points; 2) Head-to-head points; 3) Head-to-head goal difference; 4) Head-to-head away goals scored; 5) Goal difference; 6) Matches won; 7) Goals scored; 8) Play-off.
(I) Ineligible for promotion; (O) Play-off winners; (P) Promoted

==== Results summary ====
Overall								Home						Away					
Pld	W	D	L	GF	GA	GD	Pts	W	D	L	GF	GA	GD	W	D	L	GF	GA	GD
34	14	11	9	51	45	+6	53	9	5	3	27	19	+8	5	6	6	24	26	−2

Source: Liga Portugal

==== Results by round ====
Round	1
Ground	
Result	
Position	

Updated to match(es) played on August 2022. Source: Liga Portugal
A = Away; H = Home; W = Win; D = Draw; L = Loss

==== Matches ====
The league fixtures were announced on 5 July 2022.

20 May 2023 33	Académico de Viseu	2–1	Feirense	Viseu
14:00 WEST (UTC+1)				Stadium: Estádio do Fontelo; Referee: João Afonso

28 May 2023 34	Nacional	3–2	Académico de Viseu	Funchal
17:30 WEST (UTC+1)				Stadium: Estádio da Madeira; Referee: Miguel Nogueira
