= Tomás Castro (footballer) =

Portuguese footballer (born 1999)

Personal information
- Full name: Tomás Pais Neto Sarmento Castro
- Date of birth: 13 March 1999 (age 27)
- Place of birth: Lisbon, Portugal
- Height: 1.81 m (5 ft 11 in)
- Position: Midfielder

Team information
- Current team: Paços de Ferreira
- Number: 19

Youth career
- 2008–2014: Benfica
- 2014–2016: Casa Pia
- 2016–2017: Braga
- 2017–2020: B-SAD

Senior career*
Years	Team	Apps	(Gls)
2020–2023	B-SAD	26	(3)
2024	Gnistan	11	(0)
2025	Caldas	12	(1)
2025–2026	União de Santarém	16	(2)
2026	Bylis	1	(0)
2026–	Paços de Ferreira	3	(0)
- * Club domestic league appearances and goals as of 13 September 2026

Tomás Pais Neto Sarmento Castro (born 13 March 1999) is a Portuguese professional footballer who plays as a midfielder for Liga 3 club Paços de Ferreira.

== Career ==
Castro debuted for Belenenses SAD in a 2–0 Primeira Liga loss to Gil Vicente on 12 January 2020.

On 25 January 2024, Castro signed with newly promoted Veikkausliiga club IF Gnistan in Finland, on a one-year deal with an option to extend. He made his league debut with the club on 6 April 2024, in the opening match of the 2024 season, defeating Inter Turku 2–1 at home.

== Career statistics ==
As of 5 May 2025

Appearances and goals by club, season and competition
Club	Season	League			National cup (Note: Includes Taça de Portugal, Suomen Cup)		Other		Total	
Club	Season	Division	Apps	Goals	Apps	Goals	Apps	Goals	Apps	Goals
B-SAD	2019–20	Primeira Liga	1	0	0	0	–		1	0
B-SAD	2020–21	Primeira Liga	0	0	0	0	–		0	0
B-SAD	2021–22	Primeira Liga	4	0	0	0	–		4	0
B-SAD	2022–23	Liga Portugal 2	21	3	4	0	3 (Note: Includes Taça da Liga)	0	28	3
B-SAD	Total		26	3	4	0	3	0	33	3
Belenenses SAD II	2020–21	Campeonato de Portugal	7	0	–		–		7	0
Gnistan	2024	Veikkausliiga	11	0	0	0	1 (Note: Includes Finnish League Cup)	0	12	0
Caldas	2024–25	Liga 3	12	1	0	0	0	0	12	1
Career total			56	4	4	0	4	0	64	4
