= Sphephelo Sithole =

South African soccer player (born 1999)

Personal information
- Full name: Sphephelo S'Miso Sithole
- Date of birth: 3 March 1999 (age 27)
- Place of birth: Ulundi, South Africa
- Height: 1.86 m (6 ft 1 in)
- Position: Midfielder

Team information
- Current team: Tondela
- Number: 15

Youth career
- 2016–2017: KZN Academy
- 2017–2018: Sporting
- 2018–2019: Vitória Setúbal

Senior career*
Years	Team	Apps	(Gls)
2019–2023	B-SAD	71	(0)
2023–	Tondela	48	(3)
2024–2025	→ Gil Vicente (loan)	2	(0)

International career^{‡}
2015	South Africa U17		
2022–	South Africa	34	(2)
- * Club domestic league appearances and goals as of 18 May 2026 ‡ National team caps and goals as of 30 September 2026

Sphephelo S'Miso "Yaya" Sithole (born 3 March 1999) is a South African professional soccer player who plays as a midfielder for Liga Portugal 2 club CD Tondela and the South Africa national team.

== Club career ==
Sithole made his professional debut with B-SAD in a 1–1 Primeira Liga tie with Braga on 15 July 2020.

On 11 July 2023, following B-SAD's relegation from the Liga Portugal 2, Sithole signed a two-year contract with Tondela.

On 22 July 2024, Sithole joined Primeira Liga club Gil Vicente on a season-long loan deal with the option to purchase.

== International career ==
On 1 December 2025, Sithole was called up to the South Africa squad for the 2025 Africa Cup of Nations.

On 12 June 2026, in the opening game of the 2026 FIFA World Cup, Sithole received a red card after 50 minutes of play for denying Mexico midfielder Brian Gutiérrez a goal scoring opportunity, becoming the first player to be sent off in the tournament.

== Career statistics ==
=== International ===
As of match played 30 September 2026

Appearances and goals by national team and year
National team	Year	Apps	Goals
South Africa	2022	3	0
South Africa	2023	6	0
South Africa	2024	12	0
South Africa	2025	5	1
South Africa	2026	8	1
Total		34	2

Scores and results list South Africa's goal tally first, score column indicates score after each Sithole goal.

List of international goals scored by Sphephelo Sithole
No.	Date	Venue	Opponent	Score	Result	Competition	Ref.
1	15 November 2025	Nelson Mandela Bay Stadium, Gqeberha, South Africa	Zambia	3–0	3–1	Friendly	
2	30 September 2026	Al Salam Stadium, Cairo, Egypt	Eritrea	3–0	5–0	2027 Africa Cup of Nations qualification	

== Honours ==
South Africa

- Africa Cup of Nations third place: 2023
