= Rafael Vieira =

Rafael Vieira may refer to:

- Rafael Vieira (footballer, born 1992), Portuguese football centre-back

== See also ==
- Rafael (footballer, born 1978), Rafael Pires Vieira, Brazilian football centre-forward
