= Rúben Oliveira (footballer, born 1994) =

Portuguese footballer

Personal information
- Full name: Rúben Alexandre Gomes Oliveira
- Date of birth: 14 December 1994 (age 31)
- Place of birth: Oliveira de Azeméis, Portugal
- Height: 1.70 m (5 ft 7 in)
- Position: Midfielder

Team information
- Current team: Varzim
- Number: 8

Youth career
- 2003–2005: Sanjoanense
- 2005–2009: Sporting CP
- 2009–2012: Feirense
- 2012–2013: Rio Ave

Senior career*
Years	Team	Apps	(Gls)
2013–2017	Feirense	68	(3)
2017–2020	Vitória Guimarães B	17	(0)
2018–2020	→ Aves (loan)	44	(1)
2021–2023	Santa Clara	14	(0)
2022–2023	→ B-SAD (loan)	28	(1)
2024	Telavi	0	(0)
2024–	Varzim	55	(4)
- * Club domestic league appearances and goals as of 7 May 2026

Rúben Alexandre Gomes Oliveira (born 14 December 1994) is a Portuguese professional footballer who plays as a midfielder for Liga 3 club Varzim.

== Club career ==
Born in Oliveira de Azeméis, Aveiro District, Oliveira played youth football for four clubs, spending his last year as a junior with Rio Ave FC. In 2013 he signed with C.D. Feirense, making his debut in the Segunda Liga on 6 November of that year when he played the second half of the 2–1 away loss against FC Porto B.

Oliveira scored his first league goal on 12 September 2015, helping to a 2–2 away draw with Portimonense SC. He contributed a further two during the season (in 38 matches), and his team returned to the Primeira Liga after a four-year absence.

In the summer of 2017, Oliveira joined Vitória S.C. on an undisclosed deal, being initially assigned to the reserves also in the second division. He made his competitive debut with the first team on 14 October, playing the entire 6–1 away victory over amateurs Clube de Futebol Vasco da Gama in the third round of the Taça de Portugal.

For the 2018–19 campaign, Oliveira was loaned to C.D. Aves of the Portuguese top tier. His maiden appearance in the competition took place on 11 August, featuring 36 minutes in a 2–0 defeat at Vitória de Setúbal. The following 27 April he scored his first goal as a substitute to conclude a 3–0 home win over B-SAD.

On 27 January 2021, having been without a team since Aves were removed from the professional leagues the previous summer, Oliveira signed an 18-month contract at C.D. Santa Clara.
