= Kikas (footballer, born 1998) =

Portuguese footballer

Personal information
- Full name: João Diogo Alves Rodrigues
- Date of birth: 17 September 1998 (age 28)
- Place of birth: Castelo Branco, Portugal
- Height: 1.76 m (5 ft 9 1/2 in)
- Position: Striker

Team information
- Current team: Eupen
- Number: 98

Youth career
- 2006–2009: Benfica Castelo Branco
- 2009–2010: Sporting CP
- 2010–2011: Benfica Castelo Branco
- 2011–2014: Desportivo Castelo Branco
- 2014–2017: Vitória Guimarães

Senior career*
Years	Team	Apps	(Gls)
2017–2018	Benfica Castelo Branco	29	(17)
2018–2023	B-SAD	45	(12)
2020	→ Vilafranquense (loan)	6	(0)
2020–2021	→ Doxa (loan)	30	(6)
2021–2022	→ Mafra (loan)	11	(0)
2022	→ União Leiria (loan)	14	(3)
2023	→ Estrela Amadora (loan)	13	(3)
2023–2026	Estrela Amadora	80	(20)
2026–	Eupen	11	(3)
- * Club domestic league appearances and goals as of 20 April 2026

João Diogo Alves Rodrigues (born 17 September 1998), known as Kikas, is a Portuguese professional footballer who plays as a striker for Challenger Pro League club Eupen.

== Club career ==
=== Beginnings and B-SAD ===
Kikas was born in Castelo Branco, and finished his youth career with Vitória de Guimarães up north. He made his senior debut with local club Benfica e Castelo Branco in 2017, scoring 17 goals in his only season as the team finished in third position in the third division, the first outside the promotion play-offs zone. He added four in the Taça de Portugal, and in January 2018 signed a three-year contract with Belenenses to be made effective on 1 July.

Kikas' first match in the Primeira Liga took place on 27 August 2018, when he came on as a late substitute in the 1–1 away draw against Moreirense. Starting on 22 February of the following year, he netted four times in three consecutive league matches, including in a fixture at Benfica that ended 2–2.

=== Loans and journeyman ===
On 7 May 2019, Kikas agreed to an extension until 2023 with a buyout clause of €15 million. Late into the January 2020 transfer window, he was loaned to LigaPro side Vilafranquense until 30 June.

Kikas continued to be loaned by the renamed B-SAD in the subsequent seasons, to Doxa Katokopias of the Cypriot First Division, Mafra in the Portuguese second tier and União de Leiria in the third.

=== Estrela Amadora ===
In January 2023, still owned by B-SAD, Kikas moved to Estrela da Amadora. Having helped them to return to the top flight after a lengthy absence, that summer he joined them on a free transfer and a two-year deal.

Kikas scored the only goal of a 1–0 win over Gil Vicente on the final matchday of 2023–24, to secure Estrela's survival in the main tier. He totalled eight for the campaign.

In 2024–25 and the first half of the following season, Kikas was again his team's top scorer at six goals.

=== Eupen ===
On 21 January 2026, Kikas joined Belgian Challenger Pro League club Eupen on a contract until June 2028. On 6 March, he scored a hat-trick in the 4–0 victory against Jong KAA Gent.
