= Francisco Teixeira (footballer) =

Portuguese footballer

Personal information
- Full name: Francisco José Coelho Teixeira
- Date of birth: 26 April 1998 (age 28)
- Place of birth: São Sebastião, Portugal
- Height: 1.80 m (5 ft 11 in)
- Position: Midfielder

Youth career
- 2009–2017: Oriental

Senior career*
Years	Team	Apps	(Gls)
2017–2018	Oriental	23	(4)
2018–2023	B-SAD	66	(4)
2020	B-SAD B	1	(0)
2023–2025	Penafiel	29	(0)
2025–2026	Floriana	20	(1)
- * Club domestic league appearances and goals as of 23:44, 27 October 2026 (UTC)

Francisco José Coelho Teixeira (born 26 April 1998) is a Portuguese professional footballer who plays as a midfielder.

== Club career ==
Born in São Sebastião da Pedreira, Lisbon, Teixeira was developed at local Clube Oriental de Lisboa, where he debuted in the third division in 2017. At the end of the season he signed with B-SAD, being put in the under-23 team.

Teixeira played his first professional match on 28 September 2020, coming on as a 76th-minute substitute for Silvestre Varela in a 1–2 Primeira Liga home loss against F.C. Famalicão. His first goal for the club came on 23 December in a 3–0 extra-time win over S.C. Espinho at the Estádio Nacional in the fourth round of the Taça de Portugal; on at half-time for Richard Rodrigues, he opened the score. In the next round on 14 January, he netted in the final minute of the extra 30 in a 3–2 comeback victory at AD Fafe.

Teixeira recorded a first league goal on 17 April 2021 to conclude a 2–0 home defeat of C.S. Marítimo, within three minutes of entering the game; nine days later, after deciding the 2–1 win against Gil Vicente F.C. he was praised by manager Petit. He was rewarded with a new contract for 2025.

On 11 July 2023, following B-SAD's relegation from Liga Portugal 2, Teixeira signed a two-year deal with F.C. Penafiel in that league. In August 2025, he joined Floriana F.C. of the Maltese Premier League.
