= Braima Sambú =

Bissau-Guinean footballer

Personal information
- Full name: Braima Embaló Sambú
- Date of birth: 20 March 2001 (age 25)
- Place of birth: Bissau, Guinea-Bissau
- Height: 1.81 m (5 ft 11 in)
- Position: Midfielder

Team information
- Current team: Mafra
- Number: 46

Youth career
- 2016–2020: Belenenses

Senior career*
Years	Team	Apps	(Gls)
2020–2021	B-SAD B	13	(0)
2021–2023	B-SAD	45	(2)
2023–2024	Porto B	23	(0)
2024–2025	Triestina	29	(2)
2025–	Mafra	27	(2)
- * Club domestic league appearances and goals as of 7 May 2026

Braima Embaló Sambú (born 20 March 2001) is a Bissau-Guinean professional footballer who plays as a midfielder for Portuguese Liga 3 club C.D. Mafra.

== Club career ==
A youth product of Belenenses, Sambú signed his first professional contract with B-SAD on 12 May 2020. He made his professional debut with B-SAD in a 1–0 Primeira Liga loss to Braga on 19 December 2021, coming on as a substitute in the 73rd minute.

On 26 August 2023, Sambú signed a two-year contract with FC Porto, to be a part of the club's B team, competing in the Liga Portugal 2.

On 1 August 2024, Sambú moved to Triestina in Italian Serie C on a three-season contract. On 1 September 2025, Sambú moved to Portuguese Liga 3 club C.D. Mafra.

== Career statistics ==
As of match played 23 November 2025

Appearances and goals by club, season and competition
Club	Season	League			National cup		League cup		Other		Total	
Club	Season	Division	Apps	Goals	Apps	Goals	Apps	Goals	Apps	Goals	Apps	Goals
B-SAD B	2020–21	Campeonato de Portugal	13	0	—		—		—		13	0
B-SAD	2021–22	Primeira Liga	13	0	0	0	0	0	—		13	0
B-SAD	2022–23	Liga Portugal 2	32	2	5	0	3	0	2 (Note: Appearances in Liga Portugal 2 relegation play-offs)	0	42	2
B-SAD	Total		45	2	5	0	3	0	2	0	55	2
Porto B	2023–24	Liga Portugal 2	23	0	—		—		—		23	0
Triestina	2024–25	Serie C	27	1	1	0	0	0	2	0	30	2
Triestina	2025–26	Serie C	2	0	0	0	0	0	0	0	2	0
Mafra	2025–26	Liga 3	7	0	1	0	0	0	0	0	8	0
Career total			104	3	7	0	3	0	4	0	118	4
