= Riccardo Galli =

Italian goalkeeper

Personal information
- Date of birth: 19 June 1993 (age 33)
- Place of birth: Cremona, Italy
- Height: 1.85 m (6 ft 1 in)
- Position: Goalkeeper

Team information
- Current team: Vitória Setúbal
- Number: 1

Youth career
- –2010: Cremonese

Senior career*
Years	Team	Apps	(Gls)
2010–2018	Cremonese	40	(0)
2011–2012	→ Caronnese (loan)	36	(0)
2012–2013	→ Renate (loan)	14	(0)
2017–2018	→ Paganese (loan)	13	(0)
2018–2019	Paganese	16	(0)
2019–2020	Padova	0	(0)
2020–2022	Olhanense	52	(0)
2022–2023	Lusitânia	30	(0)
2023–	Vitória Setúbal	9	(0)
- * Club domestic league appearances and goals as of 19:57, 8 June 2024 (UTC)

Riccardo Galli (born 19 June 1993) is an Italian footballer who plays as a goalkeeper for Portuguese club Vitória Setúbal.

== Club career ==
He made his Serie C debut for Cremonese on 6 October 2013 in a game against Reggiana.

After playing for Paganese on loan in the 2017–18 season, he moved to the club on permanent basis on 1 July 2018, signing a two-year contract. He left the club at the end of the 2018–19 season.

On 22 August 2019, he joined Padova on a 1-year contract.
