= Trova Boni =

Burkinabé footballer

Personal information
- Date of birth: 21 December 1999 (age 26)
- Place of birth: Bobo-Dioulasso, Burkina Faso
- Height: 1.85 m (6 ft 1 in)
- Position: Centre-back

Team information
- Current team: Al Ahly SC
- Number: 15

Senior career*
Years	Team	Apps	(Gls)
2016–2017	Salitas		
2018–2021	Mechelen	0	(0)
2020	→ Varzim B (loan)	1	(0)
2021–2025	B-SAD	34	(0)
2023	→ San Antonio FC (loan)	6	(0)
2024–2025	→ San Antonio FC (loan)	16	(0)
2025–2026	Al Akhdar SC	0	(0)
2026-	Al Ahly SC	0	(0)

International career^{‡}
2018–	Burkina Faso	5	(0)
- * Club domestic league appearances and goals as of 03:50, 4 October 2026 (UTC) ‡ National team caps and goals as of 03:50, 4 October 2026 (UTC)

Trova Boni (born 21 December 1999) is a Burkinabé professional footballer who plays as a centre-back for Al Ahly SC.

== Career ==
After joining San Antonio FC on loan from B-SAD in August 2023, Boni returned to the USL Championship club again on loan in January 2024.

Following a successful season with Al Akhdar where he helped the team reach the cup semi-finals, Boni officially transferred to another Libyan club, Al Ahly Benghazi, in June 2026. In an interview, he mentioned that he chose the club because of their strong interest in him and stated his goals were to win the league title and qualify for African continental competitions.

== Career statistics ==
=== Club ===
As of 13 May 2020.

Appearances and goals by club, season and competition
Club	Season	League			Cup		Continental		Other		Total	
Club	Season	Division	Apps	Goals	Apps	Goals	Apps	Goals	Apps	Goals	Apps	Goals
KV Mechelen	2017–18	Jupiler Pro League	1	0	0	0	–		0	0	1	0
KV Mechelen	2018–19	Proximus League	0	0	0	0	–		0	0	0	0
KV Mechelen	2019–20	Jupiler Pro League	0	0	0	0	–		0	0	0	0
KV Mechelen	Total		1	0	0	0	0	0	0	0	1	0
Varzim B (loan)	2019–20	Elite Série 1 AF Porto	1	0	0	0	–		0	0	1	0
Career total			2	0	0	0	0	0	0	0	2	0

=== International ===
As of matches played 23 September 2018.

Appearances and goals by national team and year
National team	Year	Apps	Goals
Burkina Faso	2018	1	0
Total		1	0
