= Franclim Carvalho =

Portuguese football manager

Personal information
- Full name: Franclim Pereira da Silva Maia Carvalho
- Date of birth: 30 March 1987 (age 39)
- Place of birth: Miranda do Corvo, Portugal
- Position: Winger

Team information
- Current team: Braga (manager)

Senior career*
Years	Team	Apps	(Gls)
- Penelense
2010	Ansião		
2010–2011	Eirense		

Managerial career
- 2011–2013: Eirense (assistant)
- 2013–2014: Penelense (assistant)
- 2015–2016: Académica (assistant)
- 2017–2018: Braga U17 (assistant)
- 2018–2020: Braga U19 (assistant)
- 2020–2022: Belenenses SAD (assistant)
- 2022: Belenenses SAD
- 2022–2024: Braga (assistant)
- 2024: Botafogo (assistant)
- 2025–2026: Al-Rayyan (assistant)
- 2026: Botafogo
- 2026–: Braga
- * Club domestic league appearances and goals

Franclim Pereira da Silva Maia Carvalho (born 30 March 1987) is a Portuguese football manager and former player who played as a winger. He is the current manager of Primeira Liga club Braga.

== Career ==
=== Early career ===
Born in Miranda do Corvo, Coimbra District, Carvalho was a player for lowly local sides, and retired at the age of 24 at Eirense to become an assistant coach at the club. In 2013, he was also an assistant at Penelense, before leaving in the following year to Paços de Ferreira, as a scout.

Carvalho worked at Nogueirense also as a scout, and became an assistant manager at Académica de Coimbra in 2015. He became a fitness coach at Famalicão in the following year, before moving abroad in 2017 to work as a fitness trainer at South Korean side Gwangju.

=== Belenenses SAD ===
Back to Portugal in the 2017 summer, Carvalho was an assistant at Braga's under-17 and under-19 squads, before moving to Belenenses SAD under the same role in January 2020. On 11 January 2022, he replaced Filipe Cândido at the helm of the first team, signing an 18-month contract four days later. On his professional debut on 13 January, the side lost 1–0 at Famalicão, and finished the season relegated in last place; he then quoted the late manager Vítor Oliveira that "a new life begins a month or two from now".

=== Assistant ===
On 19 May 2022, Carvalho left Belenenses SAD to be Artur Jorge's assistant on a two-year deal back at Braga. He followed Artur Jorge to Botafogo and Al-Rayyan, under the same role.

=== Botafogo ===
On 2 April 2026, Carvalho returned to Brazil and Botafogo, now as the head coach of the club. On 18 August, after a run of three winless matches which included a 6–1 loss to Cienciano, he was sacked.

=== Braga ===
On 20 October 2026, Carvalho returned to Braga and replaced Carlos Vicens as first team manager.

== Managerial statistics ==
As of match played 21 November 2026

Managerial record by team and tenure
Team	Nat	From	To	Record							
Team	Nat	From	To	G	W	D	L	GF	GA	GD	Win %
Belenenses SAD	(Portugal)	11 January 2022	30 June 2022	18	3	6	9	14	28	−14	16.67
Botafogo	(Brazil)	2 April 2026	18 August 2026	22	10	7	5	36	28	+8	45.45
Braga	(Portugal)	20 October 2026	Present	7	4	2	1	10	3	+7	57.14
Total				47	17	15	15	60	59	+1	36.17
