= Nuno Tomás =

Portuguese footballer (born 1995)

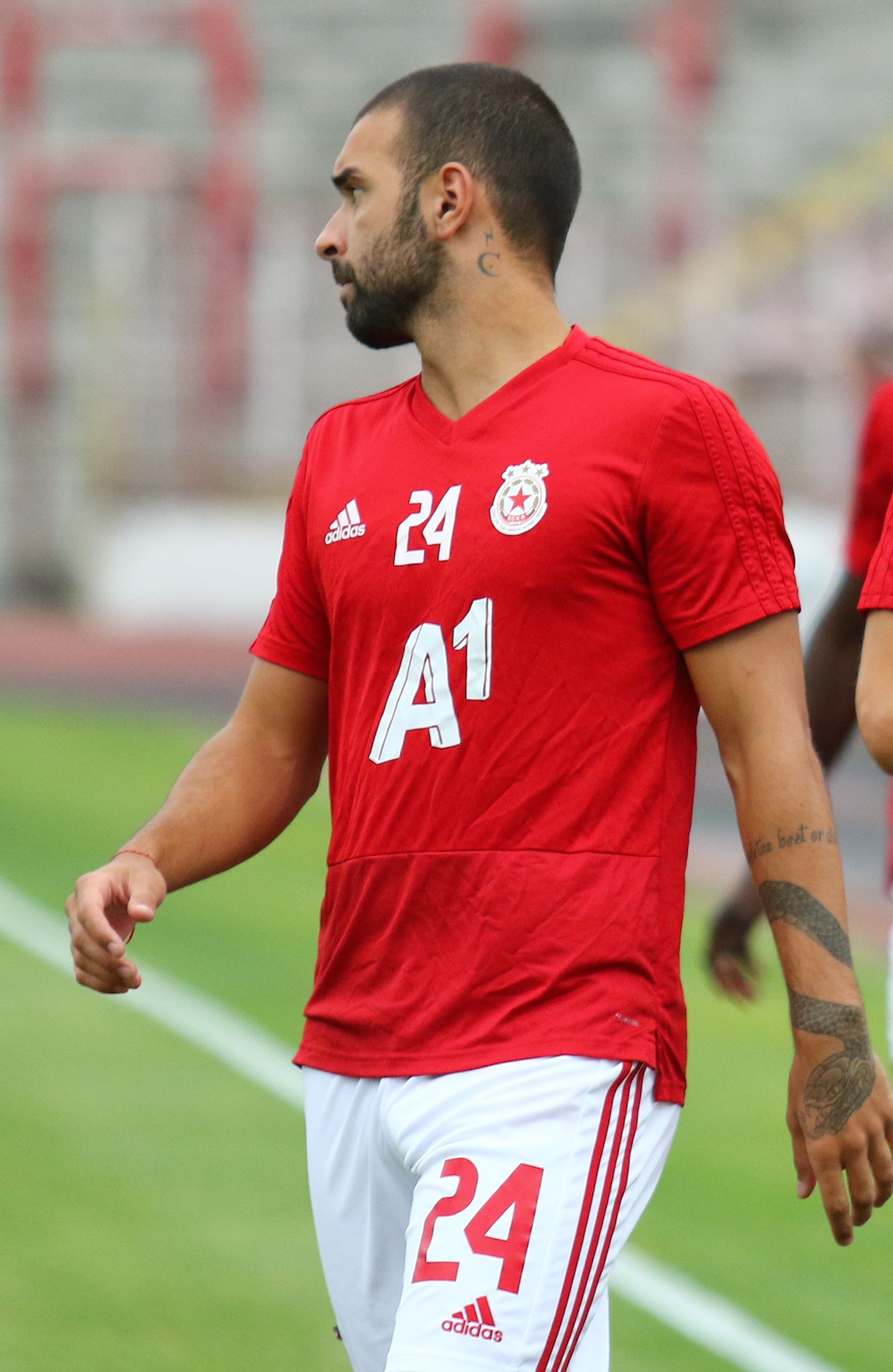
- Tomás with CSKA Sofia in 2019

Personal information
- Full name: Nuno Miguel do Adro Tomás
- Date of birth: 15 September 1995 (age 31)
- Place of birth: Odivelas, Portugal
- Height: 1.84 m (6 ft 0 in)
- Position: Centre-back

Team information
- Current team: Belenenses
- Number: 4

Youth career
- 2004–2009: Odivelas
- 2009–2014: Belenenses

Senior career*
Years	Team	Apps	(Gls)
2014–2018	Belenenses	27	(3)
2014–2015	→ Eléctrico (loan)	29	(2)
2015–2016	→ Sintrense (loan)	29	(0)
2016–2017	→ Real Massamá (loan)	30	(3)
2018–2019	B-SAD	3	(0)
2019	→ CSKA Sofia (loan)	12	(0)
2019–2021	CSKA Sofia	4	(0)
2020	→ KuPS (loan)	17	(0)
2021–2022	Académico Viseu	18	(0)
2022–2023	B-SAD	20	(1)
2024	Covilhã	14	(1)
2024–	Belenenses	41	(3)

International career
2013	Portugal U18	1	(0)
- * Club domestic league appearances and goals as of 7 May 2026

Nuno Miguel do Adro Tomás (born 15 September 1995) is a Portuguese professional footballer who plays as a central defender for Liga 3 club Belenenses.

== Club career ==
=== Belenenses ===
Born in Odivelas, Lisbon District, Tomás played youth football at local club C.F. Os Belenenses. In his first three years as a senior he was loaned to three teams in the third division, including Real S.C. who he helped gain promotion to the Segunda Liga for the first time ever.

After returning to the Estádio do Restelo for the 2017–18 season, Tomás made his Primeira Liga debut on 7 August 2017 in a 1–0 away loss against Rio Ave FC, starting and being directly involved in the opposition's goal. He scored twice in the following three league games, and on 14 September he renewed his contract until 2021.

=== CSKA Sofia ===
On 28 February 2019, Tomás was loaned to PFC CSKA Sofia of the First Professional Football League on a temporary deal with obligation to buy. In June, the Bulgarian club exercised that option.

Tomás also served a short loan at Finnish Veikkausliiga side Kuopion Palloseura.

=== Return to Portugal ===
On 19 August 2021, Tomás signed a two-year deal with Académico de Viseu F.C. as a free agent. For the following campaign, he remained in the second tier with B-SAD.

== Career statistics ==
As of 17 May 2025

Appearances and goals by club, season and competition
Club	Season	League			Cup (Note: Includes Taça de Portugal, Bulgarian Cup and Suomen Cup)		League cup (Note: Includes Taça da Liga)		Europe		Total	
Club	Season	Division	Apps	Goals	Apps	Goals	Apps	Goals	Apps	Goals	Apps	Goals
Eléctrico (loan)	2014–15	Campeonato Nacional de Seniores	29	2	1	0	–		–		30	2
Sintrense (loan)	2015–16	Campeonato de Portugal	29	0	–		–		–		29	0
Real Massamá (loan)	2016–17	Campeonato de Portugal	30	3	2	0	–		–		32	3
Belenenses	2017–18	Primeira Liga	27	3	1	0	3	0	–		31	3
B-SAD	2018–19	Primeira Liga	3	0	1	0	1	0	–		5	0
CSKA Sofia (loan)	2018–19	Bulgarian First League	12	0	3	0	–		–		15	0
CSKA Sofia	2019–20	Bulgarian First League	4	0	0	0	–		5 (Note: Appearances in UEFA Europa League)	0	9	0
KuPS (loan)	2020	Veikkausliiga	17	0	1	0	–		4 (Note: One appearance in UEFA Champions League, three appearances in UEFA Europa League)	0	22	0
Académico Viseu	2021–22	Liga Portugal 2	18	0	1	0	–		–		19	0
B-SAD	2022–23	Liga Portugal 2	20	1	3	0	1	0	2 (Note: Appearances in Liga Portugal 2 relegation play-offs)	0	26	1
Covilhã	2023–24	Liga 3	14	1	–		–		–		14	1
Belenenses	2024–25	Liga 3	20	2	1	0	–		–		21	2
Career total			223	12	14	0	5	0	11	0	253	12
