= Leonardo Chão =

Portuguese footballer

Personal information
- Full name: Leonardo Ventura Jesus Chão
- Date of birth: 1 August 1999 (age 27)
- Place of birth: Setúbal, Portugal
- Position: Forward

Youth career
- 2009–2020: Vitória Setúbal

Senior career*
Years	Team	Apps	(Gls)
2020	Vitória Setúbal	1	(0)

International career
2015	Portugal U16	2	(0)
2019	Portugal U20	1	(0)
- * Club domestic league appearances and goals as of 00:59, 10 July 2025 (UTC)

Leonardo Ventura Jesus Chão (born 1 August 1999) is a Portuguese professional footballer, who played as a forward, making one appearance ´ for Primeira Liga club Vitória Setúbal in 2020.

== Career ==
Chão made his professional debut with Vitória Setúbal in a 3–1 Primeira Liga loss to Sporting CP on 11 January 2020.
