= António Montez (footballer) =

Portuguese footballer (born 2001)

Personal information
- Full name: António Luís Cavaco Silva Sá Montez
- Date of birth: 29 September 2001 (age 25)
- Place of birth: Portugal
- Height: 1.92 m (6 ft 4 in)
- Position: Centre-back

Team information
- Current team: Lusitânia Lourosa
- Number: 6

Youth career
- 2009–2018: CIF
- 2018–2021: B-SAD

Senior career*
Years	Team	Apps	(Gls)
2020–2021	B-SAD II	10	(0)
2021–2023	B-SAD	8	(1)
2023–2024	Vitória Setúbal	33	(2)
2024–2026	Académica de Coimbra	50	(4)
2026–	Lusitânia Lourosa	3	(0)
- * Club domestic league appearances and goals as of 14 September 2026

António Luís Cavaco Silva Sá Montez (born 29 September 2001), known as just António Montez, is a Portuguese professional footballer who plays as a centre-back for Liga Portugal 2 club Lusitânia Lourosa.

== Club career ==
Montez is a youth product of CIF and Belenenses SAD. He was called to the senior team after a COVID-19 outbreak hit the squad. One of only 9 starters in the squad for the match, he made his professional debut with B-SAD in a 7–0 Primeira Liga loss to Benfica on 24 July 2021 that ended up being called off.

== Personal life ==
Montez is the grandson of former Prime Minister and President of Portugal Aníbal Cavaco Silva.
