= Filipe Cândido =

Portuguese footballer

Personal information
- Full name: Filipe Manuel Nunes Cândido
- Date of birth: 28 September 1979 (age 47)
- Place of birth: Lisbon, Portugal
- Height: 1.78 m (5 ft 10 in)
- Position: Winger

Team information
- Current team: Sumgayit (manager)

Youth career
- 1989–1990: Colégio São João de Brito
- 1990–1996: Sporting CP
- 1996–1997: Real Madrid

Senior career*
Years	Team	Apps	(Gls)
1997–1998	Vitória Setúbal	4	(0)
1998–2000	Salgueiros	12	(2)
2000–2002	Felgueiras	31	(3)
2002–2004	Leça	39	(2)
2004–2005	Académico Viseu	26	(3)
2005	Bucheon		
2005	Imortal	6	(0)
2006	Lokomotiv Sofia	0	(0)
2006–2007	Kavala	17	(2)
2007–2008	Vila Meã	20	(0)
2008–2010	Lusitânia	58	(8)
2010–2011	Vila Meã	29	(4)
2011–2013	Sousense	48	(2)
Total		290	(26)

International career
1995	Portugal U15	6	(0)
1998–1999	Portugal U20	10	(3)
2000	Portugal U21	1	(0)

Managerial career
- 2013–2015: Sousense
- 2016: Paços Ferreira (youth)
- 2016–2017: Salgueiros
- 2018–2020: União Leiria
- 2020–2021: Mafra
- 2021: União Leiria
- 2021–2022: B-SAD
- 2022–2023: Nacional
- 2023–2024: Boavista-RJ
- 2024: União Leiria
- 2025: Paços Ferreira
- 2026–: Sumgayit
- * Club domestic league appearances and goals

Filipe Manuel Nunes Cândido (born 28 September 1979) is a Portuguese former professional footballer who played as a left winger. He is currently manager of Azerbaijan Premier League club Sumgayit.

Developed mainly at Sporting CP, also spending one year with Real Madrid, he totalled 16 games and two goals in the Primeira Liga for Vitória de Setúbal and Salgueiros, and 42 appearances and three goals in the second tier for Felgueiras and Leça. He spent most of his career in the lower leagues, and also had brief stops in South Korea, Bulgaria and Greece.

A manager since 2013, Cândido led B-SAD in the top division and Mafra, Nacional, União de Leiria and Paços de Ferreira in the second.

== Club career ==
Born in Lisbon, Cândido played most of his youth career with local Sporting CP before concluding his development at Real Madrid where he trained in the first team under Fabio Capello. Turning down the prospect of a loan to CD Leganés to kickstart his career in Spain, he returned to his homeland with Vitória de Setúbal.

Cândido also represented S.C. Salgueiros in the Primeira Liga, and played in the Segunda Liga for F.C. Felgueiras and Leça FC. He spent the vast majority of his career in the amateur divisions, however, and accused several clubs of wage arrears.

A client of Jorge Mendes, Cândido left third-tier Académico de Viseu F.C. over four months of unpaid wages and signed for Bucheon SK in the K League in 2005, but stayed only a short while in South Korea due to unease with its diet. After a spell in his homeland's lower leagues at Imortal DC, he went back out abroad to PFC Lokomotiv Sofia, where he allegedly received an incomplete salary and was met with veiled threats to his safety; his contract was terminated via a conference call with former Sporting player Ivaylo Yordanov as the interpreter. In June 2006, he and compatriot Ricardo Costa signed two-year deals at Kavala F.C. in the Greek third division.

== International career ==
Cândido earned 17 caps for Portugal at youth level. His sole game for the under-21 team was on 25 January 2000, in a 1–0 friendly win over the United States in Alverca do Ribatejo.

== Coaching career ==
=== Early years ===
After retiring at UD Sousense in 2013, Cândido immediately became manager of the third division side. Following a spell with the under-19s of F.C. Paços de Ferreira, he returned to the senior game on 11 November 2016 as manager of former club Salgueiros. He won seven of his 16 fixtures in charge, resigning in April 2017 due to disputes with the board.

On 25 December 2018, Cândido resumed his career with U.D. Leiria, still in division three. After winning their group, they lost in the play-off semi-finals to U.D. Vilafranquense in a penalty shootout. He quit on 29 January 2020, due to over four months of unpaid wages.

Cândido was given his first professional league managerial job on 20 May 2020, succeeding Vasco Seabra on a two-year deal with C.D. Mafra of the second tier. He resigned the following 14 April, after a run of four defeats put the team in 10th place after a good start to the season.

=== B-SAD ===
In June 2021, Cândido returned to Leiria, in the new Liga 3. He left on 19 October to replace Petit at B-SAD in his first top-flight job; he signed an 18-month deal with the second-from-bottom club. On his debut six days later, he drew 0–0 away to Boavista FC.

On 27 November 2021, Cândido was only able to field nine players against S.L. Benfica due to a bout of COVID-19, most of them being from the under-23 side and two of them goalkeepers, including João Monteiro who made his professional debut as an emergency midfielder. Only seven returned for the second half with the score at 7–0, and shortly after Monteiro suffered an injury; the match was subsequently abandoned.

Cândido resigned on 10 January 2022 in spite of a 2–1 win over F.C. Arouca, following a run-in with chairman Rui Pedro Soares.

=== Nacional ===
On 25 May 2022, Cândido was appointed at C.D. Nacional on a one-year deal. He took the second-tier club to the semi-finals of the Taça de Portugal with a 5–2 extra-time victory at Casa Pia A.C. of the top flight.

After a 3–2 comeback win on the final day of the season at home to former club Académico, Cândido secured the Madeiran team's survival on 28 May 2023. He then left by mutual consent.

== Managerial statistics ==
As of 10 November 2024

Managerial record by team and tenure
Team	Nat	From	To	Record							
Team	Nat	From	To	G	W	D	L	GF	GA	GD	Win %
Sousense	(Portugal)	1 July 2013	30 June 2015	68	27	14	27	91	95	−4	39.71
Salgueiros	(Portugal)	11 November 2016	3 April 2017	16	7	3	6	19	13	+6	43.75
União Leiria	(Portugal)	25 December 2018	29 January 2020	44	24	11	9	67	31	+36	54.55
Mafra	(Portugal)	20 May 2020	14 April 2021	30	9	6	15	30	44	−14	30.00
União Leiria	(Portugal)	20 June 2021	19 October 2021	7	3	2	2	10	8	+2	42.86
B-SAD	(Portugal)	19 October 2021	10 January 2022	10	3	2	5	10	19	−9	30.00
Nacional	(Portugal)	25 May 2022	31 May 2023	44	17	10	17	53	59	−6	38.64
Boavista-RJ	(Brazil)	2 December 2023	22 March 2024	13	6	4	3	22	24	−2	46.15
União Leiria	(Portugal)	22 March 2024	19 November 2024	21	8	5	8	25	21	+4	38.10
Total				253	104	57	92	327	314	+13	41.11
