= Patrick (footballer, born November 1998) =

Brazilian footballer

Personal information
- Full name: Patrick Machado Ferreira
- Date of birth: 23 November 1998 (age 27)
- Place of birth: Porto Alegre, Brazil
- Height: 1.75 m (5 ft 9 in)
- Position: Attacking midfielder

Team information
- Current team: Volta Redonda

Youth career
- 2008–2018: Grêmio

Senior career*
Years	Team	Apps	(Gls)
2017–2021	Grêmio	41	(2)
2018	→ Criciúma (loan)	7	(0)
2021	→ Brasil de Pelotas (loan)	10	(0)
2022–2024	Santa Clara	1	(0)
2022–2023	→ B-SAD (loan)	9	(1)
2024	Audax Rio	6	(0)
2024	Brusque	1	(0)
2024–	Volta Redonda	57	(6)
2026	→ Confiança (loan)	17	(2)
- * Club domestic league appearances and goals as of 11 November 2026

Patrick Machado Ferreira (born 23 November 1998), simply known as Patrick, is a Brazilian professional footballer who plays as an attacking midfielder for Série C club Volta Redonda

== Club career ==
=== Grêmio ===
Born in Porto Alegre, Brazil, Patrick joined the Grêmio's Academy at the age of 10 in 2008. Patrick is a youth exponent from Grêmio. He made his league debut on 6 August 2017 against Atlético Mineiro in a 2–0 home win. He replaced Everton after 86 minutes.

== Career statistics ==
=== Club ===
As of 25 November 2021.

Appearances and goals by club, season and competition
Club	Season	League			State League		National Cup		Continental		Other		Total	
Club	Season	Division	Apps	Goals	Apps	Goals	Apps	Goals	Apps	Goals	Apps	Goals	Apps	Goals
Grêmio	2017	Série A	13	0	—		—		—		1 (Note: Appearance(s) in Primeira Liga.)	0	14	0
Grêmio	2018	Série A	0	0	1 (Note: Appearance(s) in Campeonato Gaúcho.)	0	—		—		—		1	0
Grêmio	2019	Série A	18	2	0	0	0	0	—		—		18	2
Grêmio	2020	Série A	2	0	7	0	—		0	0	—		9	0
Grêmio	2021	Série A	—		—		—		—		—		0	0
Grêmio	Total		33	2	8	0	0	0	0	0	1	0	42	2
Criciúma (loan)	2018	Série B	7	0	—		—		—		—		7	0
Brasil de Pelotas (loan)	2021	Série B	9	0	—		—		—		—		9	0
Career total			49	2	8	0	0	0	0	0	1	0	58	2

== Honours ==
Grêmio

- Copa Libertadores: 2017
- Recopa Sudamericana: 2018
- Campeonato Gaúcho: 2018, 2019, 2020, 2021
- Recopa Gaúcha: 2019, 2021
