= 2021–22 Primeira Liga =

88th season of top-tier Portuguese football

Liga Portugal
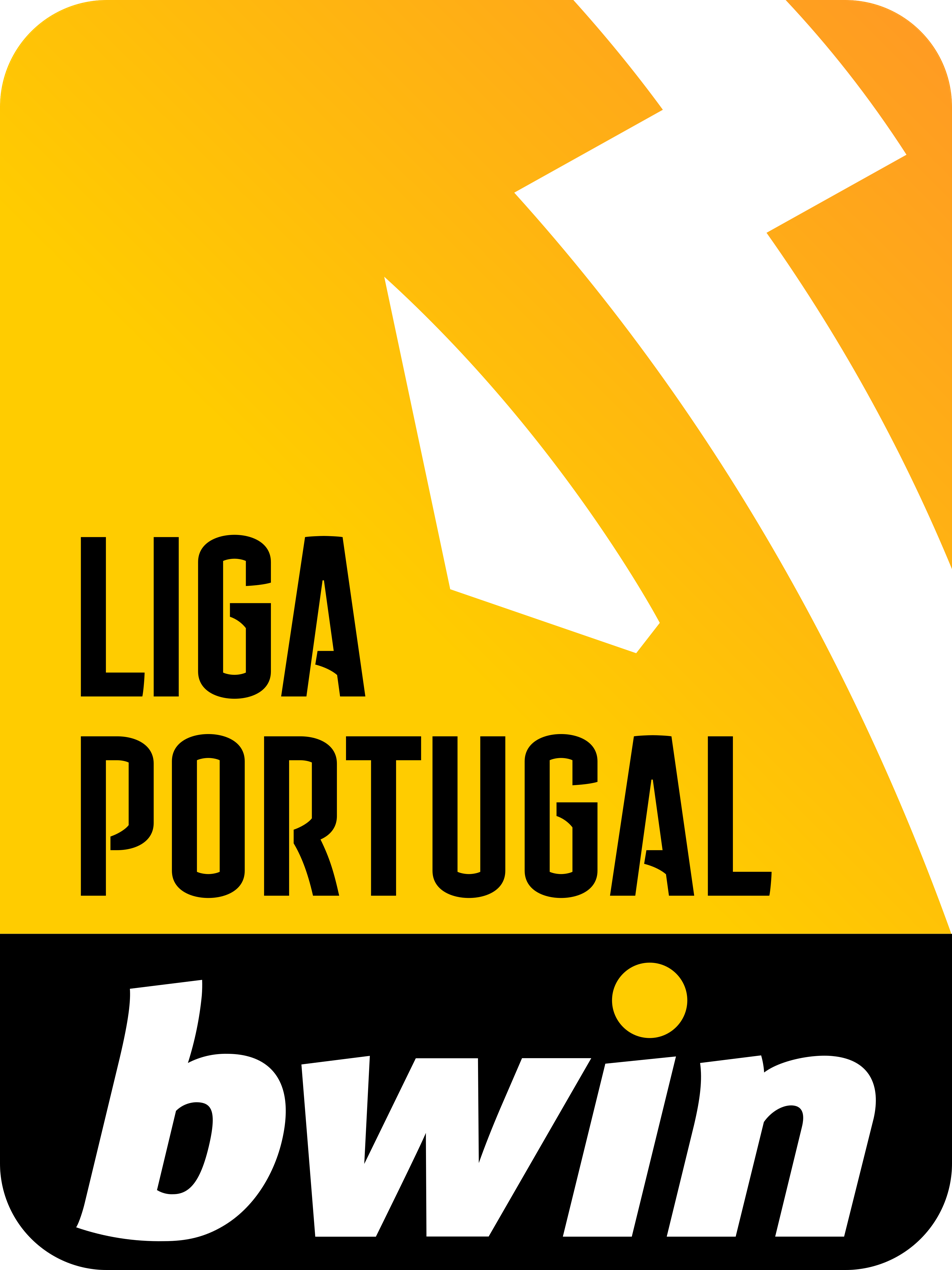
- Season: 2021–22
- Dates: 6 August 2021 – 15 May 2022
- Champions: Porto; 30th title
- Relegated: B SAD; Tondela; Moreirense
- Champions League: Porto; Sporting CP; Benfica
- Europa League: Braga
- Europa Conference League: Gil Vicente; Vitória de Guimarães
- Matches: 306
- Goals: 807 (2.64 per match)
- Top goalscorer: Darwin Núñez (26 goals)
- Biggest home win: Porto 7–0 Portimonense (16 April 2022)
- Biggest away win: B SAD 0–7 Benfica (27 November 2021)
- Highest scoring: Benfica 7–1 Marítimo (19 December 2021)
- Longest winning run: 16 matches Porto
- Longest unbeaten run: 30 matches Porto
- Longest winless run: 16 matches Vizela
- Longest losing run: 6 matches B SAD
- Highest attendance: 48,790; Benfica 1–3 Sporting CP (30 December 2021)
- Lowest attendance: 439; Tondela 3–2 Famalicão (25 September 2021) (Note: Some league matches played were played behind closed doors without any spectators or with a limited capacity due to the COVID-19 pandemic in Portugal)
- Total attendance: 2,364,659
- Average attendance: 7,482

The 2021–22 Liga Portugal (also known as Liga Portugal Bwin for sponsorship reasons) was the 88th season of the Primeira Liga, the top professional league for Portuguese association football clubs, and the first season under the current Liga Portugal Bwin title. This was the fifth Primeira Liga season to use video assistant referee (VAR). The start and end dates for the season were released on 21 May 2021, and the fixtures were released on 8 July 2021.

Sporting CP were the defending champions, having won their nineteenth Primeira Liga and their first title since the 2001–02 season at the previous season. Estoril, Vizela and Arouca joined as the promoted clubs from the 2020–21 Liga Portugal 2. They replaced Farense, Nacional and Rio Ave, which were relegated to Liga Portugal 2 the previous season.

This season saw the return of full capacity crowds, after the final third of the 2019–20 and the entirety of the 2020–21 seasons were held with limited or no attendance due to the restrictions caused by the COVID-19 pandemic in Portugal.

Porto secured their 30th league title with one match remaining, following a 1–0 away victory over rivals Benfica on 7 May 2022.

== Teams ==
Eighteen teams compete in the league – the top fifteen teams from the previous season and three teams promoted from the LigaPro: Estoril, Vizela and Arouca.

=== Changes ===
Estoril (promoted after a three-year absence) and Vizela (promoted after a 36-year absence) were promoted from the 2020–21 Liga Portugal 2 (finishing 1st and 2nd places), replacing Farense and Nacional (both relegated after only one year in the top flight).

Arouca (promoted after a four-year absence) was promoted after finishing in 3rd place in 2020–21 Liga Portugal 2 and winning the Promotion play-offs against Rio Ave (relegated after thirteen years in the top flight).

=== Stadia and locations ===
Location of teams in 2021–22 Primeira Liga (Mainland)
Location of teams in 2021–22 Primeira Liga (Madeira)
Location of teams in 2021–22 Primeira Liga (Azores)

=== Personnel and sponsors ===
Team	Manager	Captain	Kit Manufacturer	Main Sponsor
Arouca	(Portugal) Armando Evangelista	(Brazil) Thales Oleques	Skita	Construções; Carlos Pinho
B-SAD	(Portugal) Franclim Carvalho	(Portugal) Afonso Taira	Kelme	Betway
Benfica	(Portugal) Nélson Veríssimo	(Portugal) André Almeida	Adidas	Emirates
Boavista	(Portugal) Petit	(Brazil) Rafael Bracali	Kelme	Placard
Braga	(Portugal) Carlos Carvalhal	(Portugal) Ricardo Horta	Hummel	Betano
Estoril	(Portugal) Bruno Pinheiro	(Portugal) Joãozinho	Kappa	Solverde
Famalicão	(Portugal) Rui Pedro Silva	(Brazil) Gustavo Assunção	Macron	Placard
Gil Vicente	(Portugal) Ricardo Soares	(Portugal) Rúben Fernandes	Lacatoni	Barcelos Tourism
Marítimo	(Portugal) Vasco Seabra	(Portugal) Edgar Costa	Nike	Betano
Moreirense	(Portugal) Ricardo Sá Pinto	(Serbia) Lazar Rosić	CDT	Placard
Paços de Ferreira	(Portugal) César Peixoto	(Portugal) Marco Baixinho	Joma	Solverde
Portimonense	(Portugal) Paulo Sérgio	(Portugal) Pedro Sá	Mizuno	McDonald's
Porto	(Portugal) Sérgio Conceição	(Portugal) Pepe	New Balance	MEO
Santa Clara	(Portugal) Mário Silva	(Brazil) Anderson Carvalho	Kelme	Solverde
Sporting CP	(Portugal) Ruben Amorim	(Uruguay) Sebastián Coates	Nike	Betano
Tondela	(Portugal) Nuno Campos	(Portugal) João Pedro	CDT	Cabriz
Vitória de Guimarães	(Portugal) Pepa	(Portugal) André André	Macron	Placard
Vizela	(Portugal) Álvaro Pacheco	(Brazil) Marcos Paulo	Lacatoni	Vizela Tourism

=== Managerial changes ===
Team	Outgoing manager	Manner	Date of vacancy	Pos in table	Incoming manager	Date of appointment	Ref.
Pacos de Ferreira	(Portugal) Pepa	Signed by Vitória de Guimarães	1 July 2021	Pre-season	(Portugal) Jorge Simão	1 July 2021	
Vitória de Guimarães	(Portugal) Moreno (caretaker)	End of caretaker spell	1 July 2021	Pre-season	(Portugal) Pepa	1 July 2021	
Boavista	(Portugal) Jesualdo Ferreira	Mutual consent	1 July 2021	Pre-season	(Portugal) João Pedro Sousa	1 July 2021	
Santa Clara	(Portugal) Daniel Ramos	Mutual consent	7 October 2021	15th	(Portugal) Nuno Campos	12 October 2021	
B-SAD	(Portugal) Petit	Mutual consent	19 October 2021	17th	(Portugal) Filipe Cândido	19 October 2021	
Marítimo	(Spain) Julio Velázquez	Sacked	11 November 2021	17th	(Portugal) Vasco Seabra	14 November 2021	
Boavista	(Portugal) João Pedro Sousa	Mutual consent	30 November 2021	11th	(Portugal) Petit	30 November 2021	
Moreirense	(Portugal) João Henriques	Mutual consent	30 November 2021	16th	(Angola) Lito Vidigal	4 December 2021	
Pacos de Ferreira	(Portugal) Jorge Simão	Sacked	11 December 2021	13th	(Portugal) César Peixoto	16 December 2021	
Santa Clara	(Portugal) Nuno Campos	Sacked	13 December 2021	14th	(Portugal) Tiago Sousa (caretaker)	13 December 2021	
Famalicão	(Portugal) Ivo Vieira	Sacked	19 December 2021	16th	(Portugal) Rui Pedro Silva	19 December 2021	
Benfica	(Portugal) Jorge Jesus	Mutual consent	27 December 2021	3rd	(Portugal) Nélson Veríssimo (caretaker)	27 December 2021	
Moreirense	(Angola) Lito Vidigal	Sacked	5 January 2022	16th	(Portugal) Ricardo Sá Pinto	7 January 2022	
Santa Clara	(Portugal) Tiago Sousa	End of caretaker spell	10 January 2022	14th	(Portugal) Mário Silva	10 January 2022	
B-SAD	(Portugal) Filipe Cândido	Resigned	11 January 2022	18th	(Portugal) Franclim Carvalho	11 January 2022	
Tondela	(Spain) Pako Ayestarán	Sacked	16 March 2022	16th	(Portugal) Nuno Campos	16 March 2022	

== League table ==
Pos	Team	Pld	W	D	L	GF	GA	GD	Pts	Qualification or relegation
1	Porto (C)	34	29	4	1	86	22	+64	91	Qualification for the Champions League group stage
2	Sporting CP	34	27	4	3	73	23	+50	85	Qualification for the Champions League group stage
3	Benfica	34	23	5	6	78	30	+48	74	Qualification for the Champions League third qualifying round
4	Braga	34	19	8	7	52	31	+21	65	Qualification for the Europa League group stage (Note: Since the winners of the 2021–22 Taça de Portugal, Porto, qualified for the Champions League based on league position, the spot awarded to the fourth-placed team (Europa Conference League third qualifying round) was passed to the fifth-placed team, and the spot awarded to the fifth-placed team (Europa Conference League second qualifying round) was passed to the sixth-placed team.)
5	Gil Vicente	34	13	12	9	47	42	+5	51	Qualification for the Europa Conference League third qualifying round
6	Vitória de Guimarães	34	13	9	12	50	41	+9	48	Qualification for the Europa Conference League second qualifying round
7	Santa Clara	34	9	13	12	38	54	−16	40	
8	Famalicão	34	9	12	13	45	51	−6	39 (Note: Head-to-head points: Famalicão 4, Estoril 1.)	
9	Estoril	34	9	12	13	36	43	−7	39	
10	Marítimo	34	9	11	14	39	44	−5	38 (Note: Head-to-head points: Marítimo 10, Paços de Ferreira 8, Boavista 7, Portimonense 6.)	
11	Paços de Ferreira	34	9	11	14	29	44	−15	38	
12	Boavista	34	7	17	10	39	52	−13	38	
13	Portimonense	34	10	8	16	31	45	−14	38	
14	Vizela	34	7	12	15	37	58	−21	33	
15	Arouca	34	7	10	17	30	54	−24	31	
16	Moreirense (R)	34	7	8	19	33	51	−18	29	Qualification for the Relegation play-offs
17	Tondela (R)	34	7	7	20	41	67	−26	28	Relegation to Liga Portugal 2
18	B-SAD (R)	34	5	11	18	23	55	−32	26	Relegation to Liga Portugal 2

Source: Liga Portugal
Rules for classification: 1) Points; 2) Head-to-head points; 3) Head-to-head goal difference; 4) Head-to-head away goals scored; 5) Goal difference; 6) Matches won; 7) Goals scored; 8) Play-off.
(C) Champions; (R) Relegated

== Relegation play-offs ==
The relegation play-offs took place on 21 and 29 May 2022 between Moreirense who finished 16th in the Primeira Liga and Chaves who finished 3rd in Liga Portugal 2.

All times are WEST (UTC+1).

Team 1	Agg.	Team 2	1st leg	2nd leg
Chaves	2–1	Moreirense	2–0	0–1

21 May 2022
20:00

Chaves	2–0	Moreirense
João Teixeira 15'; João Correia 67'	Report

Estádio Municipal Eng. Manuel Branco Teixeira, Chaves
Attendance: 4,416
Referee: Hugo Miguel
29 May 2022
19:30

Moreirense	1–0	Chaves
Paulinho 25'	Report

Parque de Jogos Comendador Joaquim de Almeida Freitas, Moreira de Cónegos
Attendance: 4,051
Referee: António Nobre

Chaves won 2–1 on aggregate and were promoted to 2022–23 Primeira Liga; Moreirense were relegated to 2022–23 Liga Portugal 2.

== Results ==
Home \ Away	ARO	BEL	BEN	BOA	BRA	EST	FAM	GIL	MAR	MOR	PAC	PTM	POR	STA	SPO	TON	VSC	VIZ
Arouca	—	0–0	0–2	2–1	0–6	0–2	2–1	2–1	0–3	1–1	0–1	1–0	0–2	1–1	1–2	2–0	2–2	1–4
Belenenses SAD	2–1	—	0–7 (Note: The match between Belenenses SAD and Benfica was abandoned after 48 minutes of play with the visiting team leading by 0–7 after the host team was unable to field more than six players. Belenenses SAD originally fielded nine players after most of their team tested positive for COVID-19 before the match. In the return for the second half, two Belenenses SAD players abandoned the match with one more player abandoning in the 48th minute, leaving only six players on the pitch which forced the abandonment of the match.)	0–0	0–1	0–1	2–3	1–1	1–2	1–1	0–2	2–0	1–4	2–1	1–4	0–2	1–0	1–0
Benfica	2–0	3–1	—	3–1	6–1	2–1	0–0	1–2	7–1	1–1	2–0	0–1	0–1	2–1	1–3	2–1	3–0	1–1
Boavista	1–0	0–0	2–2	—	1–1	1–1	2–5	1–1	1–1	1–0	3–0	1–1	0–1	2–0	0–3	1–1	1–1	2–2
Braga	1–0	1–0	3–2	2–2	—	2–0	2–2	0–1	0–1	2–0	2–1	3–0	1–0	0–0	1–2	3–1	0–0	4–1
Estoril	1–2	2–2	1–1	2–3	0–0	—	2–2	2–2	2–1	1–0	0–0	2–0	2–3	2–2	0–1	1–0	0–0	1–2
Famalicão	0–0	1–0	1–4	1–2	3–2	3–1	—	2–2	0–0	5–0	0–0	0–3	1–2	0–0	1–1	2–1	1–2	1–1
Gil Vicente	1–1	2–0	0–2	3–0	0–1	0–0	4–0	—	1–1	1–2	1–1	1–0	1–2	2–2	0–3	3–0	3–2	2–2
Marítimo	2–2	1–1	0–1	4–0	0–2	0–0	0–1	1–2	—	0–0	2–0	0–1	1–1	4–1	1–1	1–3	0–1	2–0
Moreirense	2–1	4–1	1–2	1–2	2–3	1–0	2–2	2–2	0–1	—	1–1	0–1	0–1	0–2	0–2	2–0	0–1	4–1
Paços de Ferreira	0–0	2–2	0–2	1–1	0–0	1–3	2–0	0–1	2–0	2–1	—	1–1	2–4	2–1	0–2	1–1	1–2	2–1
Portimonense	1–1	2–0	1–2	1–1	1–2	0–2	1–0	0–1	1–2	1–0	0–1	—	0–3	2–1	2–3	1–2	1–1	0–0
Porto	3–0	2–0	3–1	4–1	1–0	2–0	3–1	1–1	2–1	5–0	2–1	7–0	—	3–0	2–2	4–0	2–1	4–2
Santa Clara	2–1	0–0	0–5	2–1	1–1	2–0	0–2	1–0	2–2	2–2	2–0	1–1	0–3	—	3–2	2–2	1–0	3–1
Sporting CP	2–0	2–0	0–2	2–0	1–2	3–0	2–0	4–1	1–0	1–0	2–0	3–2	1–1	4–0	—	2–0	1–0	3–0
Tondela	2–2	1–1	1–3	2–2	0–1	1–2	3–2	0–3	4–2	2–1	0–1	0–3	1–3	3–0	1–3	—	1–1	2–3
Vitória de Guimarães	1–3	0–0	1–3	1–1	2–1	3–1	2–1	5–0	2–1	2–1	4–0	0–1	0–1	1–1	1–3	5–2	—	4–0
Vizela	2–1	2–0	0–1	1–1	0–1	1–1	1–1	0–1	1–1	0–1	1–1	1–1	0–4	1–1	0–2	2–1	3–2	—

Source: Liga Portugal
Legend: Blue = home team win; Yellow = draw; Red = away team win.
For upcoming matches, an "a" indicates there is an article about the rivalry between the two participants.

== Statistics ==
=== Top goalscorers ===
Rank	Player	Club	Goals
1	(Uruguay) Darwin Núñez	Benfica	26
2	(Iran) Mehdi Taremi	Porto	20
3	(Portugal) Ricardo Horta	Braga	19
4	(Spain) Fran Navarro	Gil Vicente	16
5	(Spain) Pablo Sarabia	Sporting	15
5	(Colombia) Óscar Estupiñán	Vitória de Guimarães	15
7	(Colombia) Luis Díaz	Porto	14
7	(Brazil) Evanilson	Porto	14
7	(France) Simon Banza	Famalicão	14
10	(Brazil) Samuel Lino	Gil Vicente	12

==== Hat-tricks ====
Player	For	Against	Result	Date
(Iran) Mehdi Taremi	Porto	Tondela	3–1 (A)	23 October 2021
(Portugal) João Pedro	Tondela	Marítimo	4–2 (H)	7 November 2021
(Uruguay) Darwin Núñez	Benfica	B SAD	7–0 (A)	27 November 2021
(Uruguay) Darwin Núñez	Benfica	Famalicão	4–1 (A)	13 December 2021
(Portugal) Paulinho	Sporting	Portimonense	3–2 (H)	29 December 2021
(Portugal) Vitinha	Braga	Arouca	6–0 (A)	30 December 2021
(Brazil) Evanilson	Porto	B SAD	4–1 (A)	16 January 2022
(Uruguay) Darwin Núñez	Benfica	B SAD	3–1 (H)	9 April 2022
(Cameroon) Joel Tagueu	Marítimo	Boavista	4–0 (H)	16 April 2022
(Iran) Mehdi Taremi	Porto	Portimonense	7–0 (H)	16 April 2022

Notes

(H) – Home team
(A) – Away team

=== Clean sheets ===
Rank	Player	Club	Clean sheets
1	(Spain) Antonio Adán	Sporting CP	17
2	(Portugal) Diogo Costa	Porto	15
2	(Brazil) Matheus	Braga	15
4	(Portugal) André Ferreira	Paços de Ferreira	10
4	(Greece) Odysseas Vlachodimos	Benfica	10
4	(Portugal) Dani Figueira	Estoril	10
4	(Brazil) Samuel Portugal	Portimonense	10
8	(Brazil) Paulo Victor	Marítimo	9
8	(Portugal) Marco Pereira	Santa Clara	9
10	(Brazil) Luiz Júnior	Famalicão	8
10	(Brazil) Luiz Felipe	B SAD	8

=== Discipline ===
==== Player ====
- Most yellow cards: 13
  - (Brazil) Lucas Possignolo (Portimonense)
- Most red cards: 3
  - (Guinea-Bissau) Alfa Semedo (Vitória de Guimarães)

==== Club ====
- Most yellow cards: 118
  - Vitória de Guimarães
- Most red cards: 11
  - Belenenses SAD

== Awards ==
=== Monthly awards ===
Month	Player of the Month		Goalkeeper of the Month		Defender of the Month		Midfielder of the Month		Forward of the Month		Manager of the Month		Goal of the Month	
Month	Player	Club	Player	Club	Player	Club	Player	Club	Player	Club	Manager	Club	Player	Club
August	(Brazil) Lucas Veríssimo	Benfica	(Spain) Antonio Adán	Sporting CP	(Brazil) Lucas Veríssimo	Benfica	(Portugal) Pedro Gonçalves	Sporting CP	(Spain) Toni Martínez	Porto	(Portugal) Bruno Pinheiro	Estoril	(Spain) Álex Grimaldo	Benfica
September	(Uruguay) Darwin Núñez	Benfica	(Portugal) Diogo Costa	Porto	(Spain) Pedro Porro	Sporting CP	(Portugal) João Mário	Benfica	(Uruguay) Darwin Núñez	Benfica	(Portugal) Jorge Jesus	Benfica	(Brazil) Gustavo Sauer	Boavista
October/November	(Colombia) Luis Díaz	Porto	(Spain) Antonio Adán	Sporting CP	(Uruguay) Sebastián Coates	Sporting CP	(Portugal) Matheus Nunes	Sporting CP	(Colombia) Luis Díaz	Porto	(Portugal) Ruben Amorim	Sporting CP	(Colombia) Luis Díaz	Porto
December	(Portugal) Vitinha	Porto	(Portugal) Diogo Costa	Porto	(Portugal) Gonçalo Inácio	Sporting CP	(Portugal) Vitinha	Porto	(Colombia) Luis Díaz	Porto	(Portugal) Sérgio Conceição	Porto	(Portugal) Arsénio	Arouca
January	(Portugal) Vitinha	Porto	(Portugal) Diogo Costa	Porto	(Democratic Republic of the Congo) Chancel Mbemba	Porto	(Portugal) Vitinha	Porto	(Brazil) Evanilson	Porto	(Portugal) Ricardo Soares	Gil Vicente	(Brazil) Evanilson	Porto
February	(Portugal) Pedrinho	Gil Vicente	(Portugal) Diogo Costa	Porto	(Brazil) Matheus Reis	Sporting	(Portugal) Pedrinho	Gil Vicente	(Portugal) Ricardo Horta	Braga	(Portugal) Ricardo Soares	Gil Vicente	(Portugal) Ricardo Horta	Braga
March	(Portugal) Vitinha	Porto	(Portugal) Diogo Costa	Porto	(Brazil) Matheus Reis	Sporting	(Portugal) Vitinha	Porto	(Algeria) Islam Slimani	Sporting	(Portugal) Sérgio Conceição	Porto	(Portugal) Rafa Silva	Benfica
April	(Portugal) Ricardo Horta	Braga	(Brazil) Matheus	Braga	(Portugal) David Carmo	Braga	(Portugal) Fábio Vieira	Porto	(Portugal) Ricardo Horta	Braga	(Portugal) Carlos Carvalhal	Braga	(Brazil) André Silva	Arouca

=== Annual awards ===
Award	Winner	Club
Player of the Season	(Uruguay) Darwin Núñez	Benfica
Manager of the Season	(Portugal) Sérgio Conceição	Porto
Goal of the Season	(Brazil) André Silva	Arouca
Young Player of the Season	(Portugal) Vitinha	Porto
Top scorer	(Uruguay) Darwin Núñez	Benfica
Neno Club Fair-Play Prize	Benfica	

Team of the Year

Team of the Year
Goalkeeper	(Portugal) Diogo Costa (Porto)				
Defence	(Spain) Pedro Porro (Sporting CP)	(Portugal) Pepe (Porto)	(Democratic Republic of the Congo) Chancel Mbemba (Porto)	(Brazil) Matheus Reis (Sporting CP)	
Midfield	(Portugal) Ricardo Horta (Braga)	(Portugal) Matheus Nunes (Sporting CP)	(Portugal) Otávio (Porto)	(Portugal) Vitinha (Porto)	(Uruguay) Darwin Núñez (Benfica)
Attack	(Iran) Mehdi Taremi (Porto)				

== Number of teams by district ==
Rank	District Football Associations	Number	Teams
1	Braga	6	Braga, Famalicão, Gil Vicente, Moreirense, Vitória de Guimarães and Vizela
2	Lisbon	4	Belenenses SAD, Benfica, Estoril and Sporting CP
3	Porto	3	Boavista, Paços de Ferreira and Porto
4	Aveiro	1	Arouca
4	Faro	1	Portimonense
4	Funchal	1	Marítimo
4	Ponta Delgada	1	Santa Clara
4	Viseu	1	Tondela
