= Jojó (footballer, born 2001) =

Cape Verdean footballer (born 2001)

Personal information
- Full name: Jorge Miguel Lopes Xavier
- Date of birth: 19 May 2001 (age 25)
- Place of birth: Lisbon, Portugal
- Height: 1.88 m (6 ft 2 in)
- Position: Right-back

Team information
- Current team: Vizela
- Number: 77

Youth career
- 2009–2012: Amadora
- 2012–2017: Benfica
- 2017–2020: B-SAD

Senior career*
Years	Team	Apps	(Gls)
2020–2021	B-SAD B	17	(0)
2021–2024	B-SAD	32	(1)
2023–2024	→ Paços de Ferreira (loan)	21	(2)
2024–	Vizela	38	(0)
2025–2026	→ Sheriff Tiraspol (loan)	5	(0)

International career^{‡}
2024–	Cape Verde	5	(0)
- * Club domestic league appearances and goals as of 19 June 2026 ‡ National team caps and goals as of 23:06, 11 December 2025 (UTC)

Jorge Miguel Lopes Xavier (Portuguese: [ˈʒɔɾ.ʒɨ mi.ˈɡɛl ˈlɔpɨʃ ʃɐ.vi.ˈɛɾ]; born 19 May 2001), known as Jojó (Portuguese: [ʒɔ.ˈʒɔ]), is a professional footballer who plays as a right-back for Liga Portugal 2 club Vizela. Born in Portugal, he plays for the Cape Verde national team.

== Club career ==
Jojó is a product of the youth academies of Amadora, Benfica and Belenenses SAD. He made his professional debut with B-SAD in a 1–0 Taça da Liga loss to Mafra on 24 July 2021. He signed his first professional contract with B-SAD on 6 August 2021.

On 27 July 2023, recently relegated to Liga Portugal 2 side Paços de Ferreira announced the signing of Jojó from B-SAD on a season-long loan, with a future option to make the move permanent.

On 1 September 2025, Jojó was loaned to Sheriff Tiraspol in Moldova for the season. However, he returned in January 2026 and rejoined the squad.

== International career ==
Born in Portugal, Jojó is of Cape Verdean descent. In May 2024, he was called up to the Cape Verde national team for a set of matches.
