= João Monteiro (footballer) =

Portuguese footballer

Personal information
- Full name: João Manuel Silva Monteiro
- Date of birth: 7 May 2001 (age 25)
- Place of birth: Vila Nova de Gaia, Portugal
- Height: 1.86 m (6 ft 1 in)
- Position: Goalkeeper

Team information
- Current team: A.D. Sanjoanense
- Number: 1

Youth career
- 2010–2013: Coimbrões
- 2013–2019: Benfica
- 2019–2021: Belenenses SAD

Senior career*
Years	Team	Apps	(Gls)
2019–2022	Belenenses SAD	1	(0)
2020–2021	Belenenses SAD B	14	(0)
2022–2024	Académico de Viseu	4	(0)
2024–2025	Lusitânia	22	(0)
2025–	A.D. Sanjoanense	20	(0)

International career^{‡}
2016	Portugal U15	1	(0)
2016–2017	Portugal U16	9	(0)
2016–2018	Portugal U17	17	(0)
2019	Portugal U18	5	(0)
2019	Portugal U19	1	(0)
- * Club domestic league appearances and goals as of 7 May 2026 ‡ National team caps and goals as of 27 November 2021

João Manuel Silva Monteiro (born 7 May 2001) is a Portuguese professional footballer who plays as a goalkeeper for Liga 3 club A.D. Sanjoanense.

== Club career ==
Having started his football in Santa Marinha, Vila Nova de Gaia, Monteiro joined Benfica in 2013, where he signed his first professional contract in 2017. He was later transferred to Belenenses SAD in July 2019.

On 27 November 2021, as a COVID-19-hit Belenenses SAD were forced to name a team of just nine players for the Primeira Liga home game against Benfica, Monteiro made his professional debut as an outfield player, with Álvaro Ramalho playing as the goalkeeper. The encounter led to a 7–0 lead for Benfica at half time, before the game was eventually stopped during the break, as Monteiro was injured.

On 28 June 2022, Monteiro signed a two-year contract with Académico de Viseu.

== International career ==
João Monteiro is a youth international for Portugal.
