= Luís Rocha (footballer, born 1986) =

Portuguese footballer

Personal information
- Full name: Luís Carlos Rocha Rodrigues
- Date of birth: 13 August 1986 (age 40)
- Place of birth: Guimarães, Portugal
- Height: 1.86 m (6 ft 1 in)
- Position: Centre-back

Team information
- Current team: Vizela
- Number: 13

Youth career
- 1997–2005: Vitória Guimarães
- 2001–2002: → Amigos Urgeses (loan)

Senior career*
Years	Team	Apps	(Gls)
2005–2006	Torcatense	18	(3)
2006–2007	Oliveirense		
2007–2009	Mirandela	31	(6)
2009–2011	Merelinense	55	(5)
2011–2012	Lousada	27	(2)
2012–2013	Vizela	27	(2)
2013–2014	Covilhã	36	(2)
2014–2016	Freamunde	72	(4)
2016–2018	Feirense	43	(5)
2018	Dinamo Minsk	5	(1)
2019–2020	Famalicão	10	(2)
2019–2020	→ Farense (loan)	24	(3)
2020–2022	Chaves	59	(7)
2022–2023	Moreirense	30	(1)
2023–2026	Santa Clara	73	(1)
2026–	Vizela	13	(1)
- * Club domestic league appearances and goals as of 19 June 2026

Luís Carlos Rocha Rodrigues (born 13 August 1986), known as Rocha, is a Portuguese professional footballer who plays as a central defender for Liga Portugal 2 club Vizela.

Having played in the lower levels until the age of 26, he spent most of his professional career in the second tier, making over 250 appearances in service of seven clubs and winning promotion at Famalicão, Farense, Chaves, Moreirense and Santa Clara. He also recorded 85 Primeira Liga games and five goals for Feirense and Santa Clara, and had a brief spell in the Belarusian Premier League at Dinamo Minsk.

== Club career ==
=== Early career ===
Born in Guimarães, Rocha competed in lower league and amateur football until the age of 26, starting out at G.D.U. Torcatense. In 2013 he signed with Segunda Liga club S.C. Covilhã, making his debut in the competition on 11 August of that year in a 1–0 away loss against C.S. Marítimo B. He scored his first goal on 5 October, as the visitors defeated FC Porto B 2–1.

=== Feirense ===
On 9 June 2016, after a further two seasons in the second tier with S.C. Freamunde, Rocha joined C.D. Feirense on a one-year contract. His first match in the Primeira Liga took place on 15 August, when he played the full 90 minutes in a 2–0 away win over G.D. Estoril Praia. He added a further 17 appearances until the end of the campaign, helping to an eighth-place finish.

Rocha scored his first goal in the Portuguese top flight on 24 September 2017, but in a 1–4 home loss to C.F. Os Belenenses. With his second, the hosts won 1–0 but he was also sent off in the 36th minute of the fixture against Rio Ave FC.

=== Dinamo Minsk ===
On 15 June 2018, 31-year-old Rocha moved abroad for the only time in his career, to FC Dinamo Minsk of the Belarusian Premier League. He made nine appearances for the team from the capital city – including his only four European appearances in the UEFA Europa League qualifiers – and scored once to open a 1–1 home draw with FC Dynamo Brest on 28 October.

=== Second-tier regular ===
At the end of January 2019, Rocha reached a mutual agreement to end his time in Minsk, and he returned to his country's second tier on a 2 1/2-year deal at F.C. Famalicão. Having contributed ten games and two goals to their promotion as runners-up, he remained at that level by being loaned to S.C. Farense in August.

On 5 June 2020, after a second consecutive promotion, Rocha moved to G.D. Chaves. He scored five goals in his first season with the Trás-os-Montes club, starting with the opener on 15 October as his team began the campaign with a 4–0 victory at Feirense. On 24 January 2021, he netted twice in a 2–1 home win over F.C. Arouca.

Having won another promotion, Rocha again opted to remain in the second tier in June 2022, signing for newly relegated Moreirense F.C. on a one-year deal. He won the league in the ensuing season, scoring one goal to open a 3–1 home defeat of F.C. Penafiel on 10 March 2023.

Rocha also achieved promotion as champion in the 2023–24 campaign, with C.D. Santa Clara. He returned to division two in February 2026 aged 39, on a contract at former employers F.C. Vizela until June 2027.

== Career statistics ==
As of match played 24 January 2026

Appearances and goals by club, season and competition
Club	Season	League			Cup		League Cup		Other		Total	
Club	Season	Division	Apps	Goals	Apps	Goals	Apps	Goals	Apps	Goals	Apps	Goals
Torcatense	2005–06	Segunda Divisão	18	3	—		—		—		18	3
Oliveirense	2006–07	Terceira Divisão	?	?	—		—		—		?	?
Mirandela	2007–08	Terceira Divisão	27	3	—		—		—		27	3
Mirandela	2008–09	Segunda Divisão	4	3	—		—		—		4	3
Mirandela	Total		31	6	—		—		—		31	6
Merelinense	2009–10	Segunda Divisão	26	1	—		—		—		26	1
Merelinense	2010–11	Segunda Divisão	29	4	4	0	—		—		33	4
Merelinense	Total		55	5	4	0	—		—		59	5
Lousada	2011–12	Segunda Divisão	27	2	1	0	—		—		28	2
Vizela	2012–13	Segunda Divisão	27	2	2	0	—		—		29	2
Covilhã	2013–14	Liga Portugal 2	36	2	1	0	9	0	—		46	2
Freamunde	2014–15	Liga Portugal 2	31	3	4	0	2	0	—		37	3
Freamunde	2015–16	Liga Portugal 2	41	1	0	0	1	0	—		42	1
Freamunde	Total		72	4	4	0	3	0	—		79	4
Feirense	2016–17	Primeira Liga	18	0	2	0	4	0	—		24	0
Feirense	2017–18	Primeira Liga	25	5	1	0	1	0	—		27	5
Feirense	Total		43	5	3	0	5	0	—		51	5
Dinamo Minsk	2018	Belarusian Premier League	5	1	0	0	—		4 (Note: Appearances in UEFA Europa League)	0	9	1
Famalicão	2018–19	Liga Portugal 2	10	2	0	0	0	0	0	0	10	2
Farense (loan)	2019–20	Liga Portugal 2	24	3	0	0	0	0	—		24	3
Chaves	2020–21	Liga Portugal 2	32	5	1	0	0	0	—		33	5
Chaves	2021–22	Liga Portugal 2	27	2	1	0	1	0	1 (Note: Appearance in Liga Portugal 2 promotion play-offs)	0	30	2
Chaves	Total		59	7	2	0	1	0	1	0	63	7
Moreirense	2022–23	Liga Portugal 2	30	1	1	0	3	0	—		34	1
Santa Clara	2023–24	Liga Portugal 2	31	1	3	0	1	0	—		35	1
Santa Clara	2024–25	Primeira Liga	29	0	0	0	0	0	—		29	0
Santa Clara	2025–26	Primeira Liga	13	0	3	0	0	0	6 (Note: Appearances in UEFA Conference League)	0	22	0
Santa Clara	Total		73	1	6	0	1	0	6	0	86	1
Career total			510	44	24	0	22	0	11	0	567	44

== Honours ==
Moreirense

- Liga Portugal 2: 2022–23

Santa Clara

- Liga Portugal 2: 2023–24

Individual

- Liga Portugal 2 Team of the Season: 2022–23
