= Gautier Ott =

French footballer (born 2002)

Personal information
- Date of birth: 7 January 2002 (age 24)
- Place of birth: Strasbourg, France
- Height: 1.75 m (5 ft 9 in)
- Position: Winger

Team information
- Current team: Guingamp
- Number: 24

Youth career
- 2008–2014: Rossfeld
- 2014–2017: Schiltigheim
- 2017–2020: Nancy
- 2020: Hoffenheim

Senior career*
Years	Team	Apps	(Gls)
2020	Nancy	1	(0)
2020–2022	Hoffenheim II	36	(4)
2022–2025	Académico de Viseu	88	(5)
2025–	Guingamp	19	(0)

International career
2020	France U18	1	(0)
- * Club domestic league appearances and goals as of 11 May 2026

Gautier Ott (born 7 January 2002) is a French professional footballer who plays as a winger for Ligue 2 club Guingamp.

== Club career ==
Ott made his professional debut for Nancy in a 2–1 Ligue 2 loss to Clermont on 28 February 2020. In June 2020, he signed for German club Hoffenheim.
