= André Clóvis =

Brazilian footballer (born 1997)

Personal information
- Full name: André Clóvis Silva Filho
- Date of birth: 21 November 1997 (age 28)
- Place of birth: São Paulo, Brazil
- Height: 1.86 m (6 ft 1 in)
- Position: Forward

Team information
- Current team: Académico de Viseu
- Number: 33

Youth career
- –2015: Sorocaba

Senior career*
Years	Team	Apps	(Gls)
2016	Guaratinguetá	27	(13)
2017–2020	Internacional	1	(0)
2018	→ Portimonense (loan)	1	(0)
2019–2020	→ Leixões (loan)	16	(5)
2020–2023	Estoril	49	(6)
2022–2023	→ Académico de Viseu (loan)	34	(28)
2023–	Académico de Viseu	98	(42)
- * Club domestic league appearances and goals as of 19 June 2026

André Clóvis Silva Filho (born 21 November 1997), commonly known as André Clóvis, is a Brazilian professional footballer who plays as a forward for Primeira Liga club Académico de Viseu.

== Personal life ==
He is the twin brother of Anderson Silva.

== Career statistics ==
=== Club ===
As of match played 9 November 2025

Appearances and goals by club, season and competition
Club	Season	League			State league		National cup (Note: Includes Taça de Portugal)		League cup (Note: Includes Taça da Liga)		Other		Total	
Club	Season	Division	Apps	Goals	Apps	Goals	Apps	Goals	Apps	Goals	Apps	Goals	Apps	Goals
Guaratinguetá	2016	Série C	8	4	19 (Note: Appearances in Campeonato Paulista Série A3)	9	—		—		—		27	13
Internacional	2017	Série A	0	0	0	0	0	0	—		1 (Note: Appearance in Primeira Liga)	0	1	0
Portimonense (loan)	2017–18	Primeira Liga	1	0	—		0	0	0	0	—		1	0
Leixões (loan)	2018–19	LigaPro	15	4	—		0	0	0	0	—		15	4
Leixões (loan)	2019–20	LigaPro	1	1	—		0	0	0	0	—		1	1
Leixões (loan)	Total		16	5	—		0	0	0	0	—		16	5
Estoril	2020–21	Liga Portugal 2	26	5	—		3	3	0	0	—		29	8
Estoril	2021–22	Primeira Liga	23	1	—		3	1	2	0	—		28	2
Estoril	Total		49	6	—		6	4	2	0	—		57	10
Académico de Viseu (loan)	2022–23	Liga Portugal 2	34	28	—		4	1	5	2	—		43	31
Académico de Viseu	2023–24	Liga Portugal 2	33	12	—		2	1	0	0	—		35	13
Académico de Viseu	2024–25	Liga Portugal 2	32	7	—		1	0	—		—		33	7
Académico de Viseu	2025–26	Liga Portugal 2	11	11	—		2	3	—		—		13	14
Académico de Viseu	Total		76	30	—		5	4	0	0	—		81	34
Career total			184	73	19	9	15	9	7	2	1	0	226	93

== Honours ==
Estoril

- Liga Portugal 2: 2020–21

Individual

- Liga Portugal 2 Player of the Season: 2022–23
- Liga Portugal 2 Top Scorer: 2022–23
- Liga Portugal 2 Team of the Season: 2022–23
- Liga Portugal 2 Player of the Month: August 2022, October/November 2022, December 2022/January 2023, February 2023, March 2023
- Liga Portugal 2 Forward of the Month: August 2022, October/November 2022, December 2022/January 2023, February 2023, March 2023
- Liga Portugal 2 Goal of the Month: December 2022/January 2023
