= André Ceitil =

Portuguese footballer

Personal information
- Full name: André Filipe Castanheira Ceitil
- Date of birth: 11 March 1995 (age 31)
- Place of birth: Almada, Portugal
- Height: 1.84 m (6 ft 1/2 in)
- Position: Defensive midfielder

Team information
- Current team: Académico Viseu
- Number: 6

Youth career
- 2003–2005: Pescadores
- 2005–2010: Benfica
- 2010–2011: Almada
- 2011–2013: Vitória Setúbal
- 2013–2014: Rio Ave

Senior career*
Years	Team	Apps	(Gls)
2014–2016	Cova Piedade	45	(3)
2016–2017	Sintrense	24	(1)
2017–2018	Farense	25	(1)
2018–2019	Leixões	25	(0)
2019	Universitatea Cluj	13	(0)
2020–2023	Vilafranquense	57	(2)
2023−2026	Tondela	65	(4)
2026−	Académico Viseu	16	(0)
- * Club domestic league appearances and goals as of 22:48, 6 September 2026 (UTC)

André Filipe Castanheira Ceitil (born 11 March 1995) is a Portuguese professional footballer who plays as a defensive midfielder for Primeira Liga club Académico de Viseu.

== Club career ==
=== Portugal ===
Born in Almada, Setúbal District, Ceitil spent his first four years as a senior in the lower leagues, representing in the process Cova da Piedade, Sintrense and Farense. On 12 July 2018 he signed a three-year deal with Leixões of the Liga Portugal 2, making his debut in the competition on 26 August in a 2–1 away win against Estoril where he played the full 90 minutes.

In the summer of 2019, Ceitil terminated his contract at the Estádio do Mar.

=== Universitatea Cluj ===
On 7 July 2019, Ceitil joined Romanian club Universitatea Cluj for two seasons. His maiden appearance in Liga II took place on 11 August, when he started and finished the 3–0 home victory over Viitorul Târgu Jiu.

=== Vilafranquense ===
Ceitil returned to both Portugal and its second division during the 2020 January transfer window, joining newly promoted Vilafranquense on a one-and-a-half-year contract. He appeared in six matches until the end of the campaign– curtailed because of the COVID-19 pandemic and with no relegations due to Vitória de Setúbal and Aves' serious financial problems which led to their exclusion from the Primeira Liga.

=== Tondela ===
On 2 June 2023, Ceitil joined Portuguese second division side Tondela on a two-year deal. He went on to make 73 appearances and score four goals, achieving top-tier promotion at the end of his second season as champions.

Ceitil's debut in the top flight took place on 23 August 2025 aged 30, as a late substitute in a 3–0 loss away to Benfica.

=== Later career ===
On 26 January 2026, Ceitil moved to second-tier club Académico de Viseu on a contract until June 2027; in spite of this, he had recently extended his link at the Estádio João Cardoso.

== Honours ==
Tondela

- Liga Portugal 2: 2024–25
