= Álvaro Ramalho =

Portuguese association football player

Personal information
- Full name: Álvaro Raul Sofrimento Ramalho
- Date of birth: 20 January 1999 (age 27)
- Place of birth: Lisbon, Portugal
- Height: 1.88 m (6 ft 2 in)
- Position: Goalkeeper

Team information
- Current team: Chalkanoras Idaliou
- Number: 99

Youth career
- 2009–2010: FC Despertar
- 2010–2011: Estrela
- 2011–2014: Benfica
- 2014–2017: Belenenses
- 2017–2018: Real SC
- 2018–2020: Belenenses SAD

Senior career*
Years	Team	Apps	(Gls)
2020–2021	Belenenses SAD II	4	(0)
2021–2023	Belenenses SAD	4	(0)
2024–	Chalkanoras Idaliou	29	(0)
- * Club domestic league appearances and goals as of 25 June 2025

Álvaro Raul Sofrimento Ramalho (born 20 January 1999) is a Portuguese professional footballer who plays as a goalkeeper for Cypriot club Chalkanoras Idaliou.

== Club career ==
Ramalho is a youth product of FC Despertar, Estrela, Benfica, Belenenses, Real SC and Belenenses SAD. He began his senior career as the U23 goalkeeper for B-SAD, before being promoted to the first team in the summer of 2021. Normally the reserve keeper of B-SAD, Ramalho was called to the senior team after a COVID-19 outbreak hit the squad. One of only 9 starters in the squad for the match, he made his professional debut with B-SAD in a 7–0 Primeira Liga loss to Benfica on 24 July 2021 that ended up being called off.
