= Rafael Vieira (footballer, born 1992) =

Portuguese footballer

Personal information
- Full name: Rafael José Fernandes Teixeira Vieira
- Date of birth: 9 July 1992 (age 34)
- Place of birth: Braga, Portugal
- Height: 1.87 m (6 ft 1 1/2 in)
- Position: Centre-back

Team information
- Current team: Paços de Ferreira
- Number: 33

Youth career
- 2009–2011: Vitória SC

Senior career*
Years	Team	Apps	(Gls)
2011–2013	Vitória SC	0	(0)
2011–2012	→ Lousada (loan)	11	(2)
2012	→ Ribeirão (loan)	9	(0)
2012–2013	Vitória SC B	15	(0)
2013–2014	Ribeirão	16	(1)
2014–2016	Bragança	61	(1)
2016–2018	Vilaverdense	58	(4)
2018–2019	Sporting Covilhã	27	(0)
2019–2020	Farense	15	(0)
2020–2021	Académica	32	(0)
2021–2023	Nacional	52	(2)
2023	Al-Bukiryah	0	(0)
2023–2025	Leixões	34	(0)
2025–	Paços de Ferreira	26	(1)
- * Club domestic league appearances and goals as of 20 June 2026

Rafael José Fernandes Teixeira Vieira, known as Rafael Vieira or Rafa Vieira (born 9 July 1992) is a Portuguese professional footballer who plays as a centre-back for Liga 3 club Paços de Ferreira.

== Club career ==
He made his professional debut in the Segunda Liga for Vitória SC B on 18 August 2012 in a game against Sporting B.

On 9 June 2021, he moved to Nacional on a two-year contract.

On 30 June 2023, Vieira joined Saudi First Division side Al-Bukiryah.

On 9 August 2023, Vieira left Al-Bukiryah without playing a single game and joined Leixões.

On 7 August 2025, Vieira moved to Paços de Ferreira on a one-season deal.
