= 2022–23 Liga Portugal 2 =

33rd season of second-tier football league in Portugal

Liga Portugal 2
- Season: 2022–23
- Dates: August 2022 – May 2023
- Champions: Moreirense
- Promoted: Moreirense; Farense; Estrela da Amadora
- Relegated: B-SAD; Trofense; Sporting Covilhã
- Matches: 306
- Biggest home win: Benfica B 5–1 Mafra (19 October 2022)
- Biggest away win: Benfica B 3–6 Farense (8 January 2023)
- Highest scoring: Moreirense 7–4 Benfica B (16 April 2023)
- All statistics correct as of 18 May 2022.

The 2022–23 Liga Portugal 2, also known as Liga Portugal SABSEG for sponsorship reasons, is the 33rd season of Portuguese football's second-tier league, and the third season under the current Liga Portugal 2 title. A total of 18 teams are competing in this division, including reserve sides from top-flight Primeira Liga teams.

== Teams ==
A total of 18 teams contest the league, including 13 sides from the 2021–22 season, 3 teams relegated from the 2021–22 Primeira Liga and 2 promoted from the 2021–22 Liga 3.

Moreirense, Tondela and B-SAD were relegated to 2021–22 Liga Portugal 2 after finishing in 16th, 17th and 18th placed teams in 2021–22 Primeira Liga.

Torreense (promoted after a 24-year absence) and Oliveirense (promoted after a one-year absence) were promoted from the 2021–22 Liga 3, replacing Varzim and Académica.

=== Team changes ===
Relegated from 2021–22 Primeira Liga

- Moreirense
- Tondela
- B-SAD

Promoted from 2021–22 Liga 3

- Torreense
- Oliveirense

Promoted to 2022–23 Primeira Liga

- Rio Ave
- Casa Pia
- Chaves

Relegated to 2022–23 Liga 3

- Varzim
- Académica

=== Stadium and locations ===
Location of teams in 2021–22 Liga Portugal 2
Location of teams in 2021–22 Primeira Liga (Madeira)

Team	Location	Stadium	Capacity	2021–22 finish
Académico de Viseu	Viseu	Estádio do Fontelo	6,912	15th
Benfica B	Seixal	Benfica Campus	2,644	5th
B-SAD	Oeiras	Estádio Nacional	37,593	18th (PL)
Estrela da Amadora	Amadora	Estádio José Gomes	9,288	14th
Farense	Faro	Estádio de São Luís	7,000	11th
Feirense	Santa Maria da Feira	Estádio Marcolino de Castro	5,401	4th
Leixões	Matosinhos	Estádio do Mar	9,821	8th
Mafra	Mafra	Estádio Municipal de Mafra	1,257	9th
Moreirense	Moreira de Cónegos	Parque de Jogos Comendador; Joaquim de Almeida Freitas	6,150	16th (PL)
Nacional	Funchal	Estádio da Madeira	5,200	6th
Oliveirense	Oliveira de Azeméis	Estádio Carlos Osório	1,750	2nd (L3)
Penafiel	Penafiel	Estádio Municipal 25 de Abril	5,230	7th
Porto B	Vila Nova de Gaia	Estádio Municipal Jorge Sampaio	8,272	10th
Sp. Covilhã	Covilhã	Estádio Municipal; José dos Santos Pinto	3,500	16th
Tondela	Tondela	Estádio João Cardoso	5,000	17th (PL)
Torreense	Torres Vedras	Estádio Manuel Marques	2,431	1st (L3)
Trofense	Trofa	Estádio do CD Trofense	5,074	13th
Vilafranquense	Vila Franca de Xira	Estádio Municipal de Rio Maior	7,000	12th

=== Personnel and sponsors ===
Team	Manager	Captain	Kit Manufacturer	Main Sponsor
Académico de Viseu	(Portugal) Pedro Bessa	(Angola) Paná	Joma	Palácio do Gelo
Benfica B	(Portugal) Luís Castro	(Portugal) Diogo Capitão	Adidas	Emirates
B-SAD	(Portugal) Zé Pedro	(Portugal) Nuno Tomás	Kelme	Betway
Estrela da Amadora	(Portugal) Sérgio Vieira	(Portugal) Miguel Lopes	Lacatoni	My Football Club
Farense	(Portugal) José Mota	(Brazil) Fabrício Isidoro	Lacatoni	Couteiro-Mor
Feirense	(Portugal) Rui Ferreira	(Brazil) Washington	Kelme	
Leixões	(Portugal) Vítor Martins	(Portugal) Fabinho	AM	Matosinhos
Mafra	(Portugal) Rui Borges	(Portugal) Gui Ferreira	Lacatoni	Placard
Moreirense	(Portugal) Paulo Alves	(Portugal) Luís Rocha	CDT	Placard
Nacional	(Portugal) Filipe Cândido	(Portugal) Rafael Vieira	Hummel	Solverde
Oliveirense	(Portugal) Fábio Pereira	(Brazil) Filipe Alves	Kelme	Onodera Group
Penafiel	(Portugal) Hélder Cristóvão	(Portugal) Roberto	Macron	EDIRCOP
Porto B	(Portugal) António Folha	(Portugal) Zé Pedro	New Balance	AMCO
Sp. Covilhã	(Portugal) Alex Costa	(Portugal) Gilberto Silva	Lacatoni	Municipio da Covilhã
Tondela	(Portugal) Tozé Marreco	(Portugal) Ricardo Alves	CDT	Cabriz
Torreense	(Portugal) Pedro Moreira	(Portugal) João Pereira	Kappa	Agriloja
Trofense	(Portugal) Rui Sacramento	(Portugal) Vasco Rocha	Lacatoni	Mercainox
Vilafranquense	(Portugal) Ricardo Chéu	(Portugal) André Ceitil	Adidas	

== Season summary ==
=== League table ===
Pos	Team	Pld	W	D	L	GF	GA	GD	Pts	Promotion or relegation
1	Moreirense (C, P)	34	24	7	3	77	38	+39	79	Promotion to Primeira Liga
2	Farense (P)	34	21	6	7	57	34	+23	69	Promotion to Primeira Liga
3	Estrela da Amadora (O, P)	34	16	15	3	55	35	+20	63	Qualification to Promotion play-offs
4	Académico de Viseu	34	14	11	9	51	45	+6	53	
5	Porto B (I)	34	14	9	11	48	40	+8	51	
6	Mafra	34	12	11	11	46	49	−3	47	
7	Vilafranquense	34	12	10	12	42	36	+6	46 (Note: Vilafranquense are ahead of Feirense on head-to-head points: Vilafranquense 1–0 Feirense, Feirense 1–2 Vilafranquense.)	
8	Feirense	34	11	13	10	43	37	+6	46	
9	Torreense	34	13	5	16	38	41	−3	44	
10	Oliveirense	34	11	10	13	51	50	+1	43	
11	Tondela	34	8	16	10	35	35	0	40	
12	Penafiel	34	9	12	13	36	47	−11	39 (Note: Penafiel are ahead of Nacional on head-to-head points: Penafiel 3–0 Nacional, Nacional 1–1 Pennafiel.)	
13	Nacional	34	10	9	15	35	46	−11	39	
14	Benfica B (I)	34	10	8	16	52	58	−6	38 (Note: Benfica B are ahead of Leixões on head-to-head points: Benfica B 2–1 Leixões, Leixões 1–1 Benfica B. Leixões were deducted 1 point for financial irregularities.)	
15	Leixões	34	10	9	15	38	49	−11	38	
16	B-SAD (R)	34	9	8	17	41	59	−18	35	Qualification to Relegation play-offs
17	Trofense (R)	34	8	8	18	31	51	−20	32	Relegation to Liga 3
18	Sporting da Covilhã (R)	34	7	7	20	31	57	−26	28	Relegation to Liga 3

Updated to match(es) played on 28 May 2023. Source: Liga Portugal 2
Rules for classification: 1) Points; 2) Head-to-head points; 3) Head-to-head goal difference; 4) Head-to-head away goals scored; 5) Goal difference; 6) Matches won; 7) Goals scored; 8) Play-off.
(C) Champions; (I) Ineligible for promotion; (O) Play-off winners; (P) Promoted; (R) Relegated

== Relegation play-offs ==
The relegation play-offs will take place on 3 and 11 June 2023 between B-SAD who finished 16th in the Liga 2 and Länk Vilaverdense who finished 3rd in Liga 3.

All times are WEST (UTC+1).

Team 1	Agg.	Team 2	1st leg	2nd leg
Länk Vilaverdense	2–1	B-SAD	1–1	0–1

3 June 2023
18:00

Länk Vilaverdense	1–1	B-SAD
Gonçalo Teixeira 30'	Report	João Lima 5'

Campo Cruz do Reguengo, Vila Verde
Attendance: 215
Referee: Gustavo Correia (Portugal)
11 June 2023
17:00

B-SAD	0–1	Länk Vilaverdense
	Report	João Batista 21'

Estádio Municipal, Rio Maior
Referee: Artur Soares Dias (Porto)

== Results ==
Home \ Away	ACV	BEN	BSA	EST	FAR	FEI	LEI	MAF	MOR	NAC	OLI	PEN	POR	SCO	TON	TOR	TRO	VIL
Académico de Viseu	—	2–0	2–1	1–1	2–0	2–1	2–2	2–0	1–3	1–1	1–4	0–0	2–1	1–0	2–2	1–2	3–1	2–0
Benfica B	1–1	—	0–1	1–2	0–1	3–6	2–1	5–1	2–1	1–2	2–0	1–2	2–2	4–0	2–1	1–2	0–0	0–2
B-SAD	1–1	0–2	—	1–3	2–3	1–1	2–0	2–2	2–3	0–1	2–1	2–2	2–3	0–1	0–2	1–3	1–1	0–3
Estrela da Amadora	2–1	2–1	2–0	—	1–1	4–1	2–2	2–2	2–4	0–1	1–0	3–0	1–1	2–1	0–0	1–0	2–2	1–1
Farense	2–2	5–2	4–0	2–2	—	0–0	1–0	1–0	3–1	1–0	2–0	2–1	2–0	2–2	3–1	2–1	3–1	2–1
Feirense	1–1	1–2	0–1	1–1	1–2	—	1–1	0–0	1–2	1–1	3–2	2–1	3–0	0–2	1–1	4–1	1–0	1–2
Leixões	2–3	1–1	0–2	1–1	0–1	0–1	—	0–2	0–1	3–0	1–2	2–1	0–0	3–2	1–1	1–0	1–0	2–0
Mafra	2–0	1–1	0–1	2–2	0–3	1–1	1–1	—	0–2	3–3	2–3	3–0	0–1	3–2	1–1	1–0	1–0	2–1
Moreirense	1–0	7–4	4–1	0–0	3–2	0–0	4–2	4–2	—	3–1	4–1	3–1	3–2	6–4	2–1	3–0	1–0	1–0
Nacional	3–2	2–0	1–3	0–1	0–1	0–0	1–2	0–2	0–2	—	0–3	1–1	3–0	2–0	0–1	3–1	0–1	1–1
Oliveirense	1–1	2–2	2–1	1–2	1–2	0–1	4–3	3–1	2–2	0–0	—	1–1	2–1	2–0	0–0	3–1	1–1	2–2
Penafiel	1–2	0–3	3–3	2–4	0–2	0–1	0–0	1–0	1–1	3–0	1–1	—	1–2	1–1	1–0	0–0	3–0	1–1
Porto B	3–1	3–1	1–2	1–2	4–0	0–0	4–0	1–1	0–0	1–1	2–0	0–0	—	0–1	0–0	2–0	4–2	0–1
Sp. Covilhã	2–3	2–1	1–1	0–2	1–0	0–2	1–2	1–2	0–0	1–2	2–1	0–2	1–2	—	1–0	0–3	0–2	0–0
Tondela	1–1	1–1	3–1	1–1	1–0	1–1	2–3	1–2	1–1	1–0	1–3	0–1	0–1	1–1	—	1–1	0–0	1–0
Torreense	1–2	0–0	0–1	1–0	1–0	4–2	2–0	0–1	1–0	0–2	1–1	5–1	3–0	3–1	0–3	—	0–0	0–1
Trofense	1–0	1–2	3–2	2–2	2–1	0–3	1–2	1–2	0–3	2–2	2–1	1–2	0–3	2–0	1–2	0–1	—	1–3
Vilafranquense	1–3	3–2	1–1	0–1	1–1	1–0	2–0	3–3	1–2	4–0	2–1	0–1	1–2	0–0	1–1	2–0	0–1	—

First match(es) will be played: 28 May 2023. Source: Liga Portugal 2
Legend: Blue = home team win; Yellow = draw; Red = away team win.

=== Positions by round ===
The table lists the positions of teams after each week of matches. In order to preserve chronological evolvements, any postponed matches are not included to the round at which they were originally scheduled, but added to the full round they were played immediately afterwards.

Team ╲ Round	1	2	3	4	5	6	7	8	9	10	11	12	13	14	15	16	17	18	19	20	21	22	23	24	25	26	27	28	29	30	31	32	33	34
Académico de Viseu	7	15	15	15	17	18	13	11	11	10	8	10	6	3	3	3	5	4	4	4	4	3	4	4	4	4	4	4	4	4	4	4	4	4
Benfica B	7	13	14	14	11	11	9	9	8	4	3	3	3	5	8	8	9	10	8	10	13	12	14	14	11	11	13	14	14	12	13	13	13	14
B-SAD	13	17	17	17	13	13	15	17	13	15	16	16	16	16	15	15	16	16	16	16	16	16	16	16	16	16	16	16	16	16	16	16	16	16
Estrela da Amadora	7	13	7	6	6	5	6	8	7	8	9	5	4	4	4	4	3	3	3	2	2	2	2	2	2	2	2	2	2	2	3	3	3	3
Farense	3	3	6	3	3	3	2	2	2	2	2	2	2	2	2	2	2	2	2	3	3	4	3	3	3	3	3	3	3	3	2	2	2	2
Feirense	7	2	5	9	10	9	8	6	9	5	5	6	7	8	5	6	6	8	11	8	9	10	10	8	7	7	7	6	5	7	6	8	9	8
Leixões	12	8	9	4	5	8	10	10	10	11	11	9	10	10	11	11	13	12	12	12	10	11	11	12	13	14	11	11	13	14	14	14	14	15
Mafra	18	5	2	8	9	10	11	12	14	14	12	12	12	12	12	13	12	14	15	15	15	15	15	15	14	13	14	13	11	9	7	7	8	6
Moreirense	4	1	1	1	1	1	1	1	1	1	1	1	1	1	1	1	1	1	1	1	1	1	1	1	1	1	1	1	1	1	1	1	1	1
Nacional	15	7	12	16	18	12	14	16	15	16	15	14	13	13	13	14	15	15	14	14	14	14	13	13	15	15	15	15	15	15	15	15	15	13
Oliveirense	1	5	11	11	14	14	16	15	12	12	13	13	14	14	14	12	11	9	9	6	6	8	8	11	12	12	9	12	10	11	11	11	11	10
Penafiel	11	16	16	10	4	7	7	7	6	9	10	11	11	11	9	9	10	11	10	11	11	7	7	9	9	10	12	10	12	13	12	12	12	12
Porto B	15	9	3	5	6	6	5	5	4	3	4	4	8	6	7	7	7	6	6	7	7	6	6	7	6	6	6	7	7	6	8	6	5	5
Sp. Covilhã	4	12	10	13	12	15	17	18	18	18	18	18	18	18	18	18	18	18	18	18	18	18	18	17	17	18	18	18	18	18	18	18	18	18
Tondela	4	4	8	7	6	4	4	4	5	7	7	8	9	9	10	10	8	7	7	9	8	9	9	6	8	9	10	9	9	10	10	10	10	11
Torreense	14	18	18	18	16	17	18	13	16	13	14	15	15	15	16	16	14	13	13	13	12	13	12	10	10	8	8	8	8	8	9	9	7	9
Trofense	2	9	13	12	15	16	12	14	17	17	17	17	17	17	17	17	17	17	17	17	17	17	17	18	18	17	17	17	17	17	17	17	17	17
Vilafranquense	15	11	3	2	2	2	3	3	3	6	6	7	5	7	6	5	4	5	5	5	5	5	5	5	5	5	5	5	6	5	5	5	6	7

Leader and promotion to Primeira Liga
Promotion to Primeira Liga
Qualification to Promotion play-offs
Qualification to Relegation play-offs
Relegation to Liga 3

Updated to match(es) played on 27 May 2023. Source: Liga Portugal 2

== Number of teams by district ==
Rank	District Football Associations	Number	Teams
1	Lisbon	6	B-SAD, Benfica B, Estrela da Amadora, Mafra, Torreense and Vilafranquense
2	Porto	4	Leixões, Penafiel, Porto B and Trofense
3	Aveiro	2	Feirense and Oliveirense
3	Viseu	2	Académico de Viseu and Tondela
5	Braga	1	Moreirense
5	Castelo Branco	1	Sp. Covilhã
5	Faro	1	Farense
5	Funchal	1	Nacional

== Attendances ==
#	Club	Average
1	Farense	3,468
2	Viseu	1,916
3	Estrela	1,822
4	Leixões	1,592
5	Nacional	1,474
6	Moreirense	1,450
7	Feirense	1,362
8	Tondela	994
9	Trofense	791
10	Mafra	731
11	Torreense	731
12	Oliveirense	689
13	Covilhã	681
14	Penafiel	641
15	Benfica B	549
16	Porto B	424
17	B-SAD	393
18	Vilafranquense	163
