= Vitória F.C. =

Portuguese association football club

Vitória de Setúbal
- Full name: Vitória Futebol Clube
- Nicknames: Sadinos; O Velho Senhor
- Founded: 20 November 1910; 115 years ago
- Ground: Estádio do Bonfim
- Capacity: 15,497
- Chairman: Francisco Alves Rito
- Manager: Paulo Martins
- League: AF Setúbal
- 2026–27: Campeonato de Portugal - Tier 4
- Website: vfc.pt
Home colours	Away colours	Third colours

Vitória Futebol Clube (Portuguese pronunciation: [viˈtɔɾiɐ ðɨ sɨˈtuβal]), commonly known as Vitória de Setúbal, is a Portuguese professional football club based in Setúbal that used to compete in the Primeira Liga, the top flight of Portuguese football, at the Estádio do Bonfim. At the moment, they are playing in the fourth tier Campeonato de Portugal after many financial problems. The club was born under the original name Sport Victoria from the ashes of the small Bonfim Foot-Ball Club.

When it comes to main achievements in Portugal, Vitória de Setúbal has won four trophies: three Taça de Portugal one Taça da Liga. In the past two seasons, the team has also won A.F. Setúbal 1ª Divisão and A.F. Setúbal 2ª Divisão. Internationally, Vitória has won a Small Club World Cup and an Iberian Cup. Historically, it is one of the most decorated clubs in the country.

== History ==
Evolution of Vitória Futebol Clube's league performances since 1938

Vitória de Setúbal played in the inaugural Campeonato da Liga in 1934–35.

In 1964–65, Vitória de Setúbal won their first Taça de Portugal, beating holders Benfica 3–1 in the final. After losing 1–0 to Braga in the next season's final, Vitória won the 1967 final by beating Académica de Coimbra 3–2 after extra-time.

Vitoria competed in the European Cup-Winners' Cup in 1965-66 (losing 4–2 on aggregate in the first round to AGF Aarhus), and 1967-68 (losing 7–3 on aggregate to Bayern Munich in the second round).

Vitória de Setúbal played in the Fairs Cup in 1969–70, knocking Liverpool out in the second round. In the next round, they were eliminated 2–1 on aggregate by Hertha BSC.

In the 1973–74 season, Vitória de Setúbal finished in third place, four points behind champions Sporting CP.

After another yo-yo period from the mid-1980s to the mid-2000s, Vitória returned to the Portuguese top flight for the 2004–05 season. The same season saw them win their third Cup, beating holders Benfica 2–1 in the final on 29 May. On 13 August, the two clubs played the Super Cup against each other at the Estádio do Algarve, with Benfica winning 1–0. On 14 May 2006, Vitória lost the cup final by one goal to FC Porto.

On 22 March 2008, Vitória won the Taça da Liga for the first time. In the final, they defeated Sporting on penalties following a goalless draw; on-loan goalkeeper Eduardo saved three times. Ten years later, the final went to penalties against the same opponent, who won this time. Vitória avoided relegation by one point in 2019–20, but due to its financial distress and the failure to gain a licence for the new season, they were administratively relegated to the third-tier Campeonato de Portugal, after failing to obtain the license to remain in the Liga NOS and LigaPro, Portimonense remained in the Primeira Liga, replacing Vitória.

Vitória were promoted after one season, but remained in the third division due to the creation of Liga 3; their registration was permitted due to their improved financial situation. In 2022–23, the team were relegated to the now fourth-tier Campeonato de Portugal on the final day despite beating F.C. Oliveira do Hospital on the final day, due to Sporting CP B's late winner over Real SC.

In June/July 2024, after failing to qualify for Liga 3 and the Campeonato de Portugal, Vitória de Setúbal did not obtain a licence for the 2024–25 season, being relegated to the second division of Setúbal Football Association's district leagues (6th level of football in Portugal) In the 2024–25 season, Vitória won promotion as champions. The newly promoted team joined the First Division of the AF Setúbal, the 5th tier in the pyramid of Portuguese football, for the 2025–26 season, and was once again crowned champion and was promoted. Vitória entered the Campeonato de Portugal, tier 4, in the 2026–27 season.

== Stadium ==
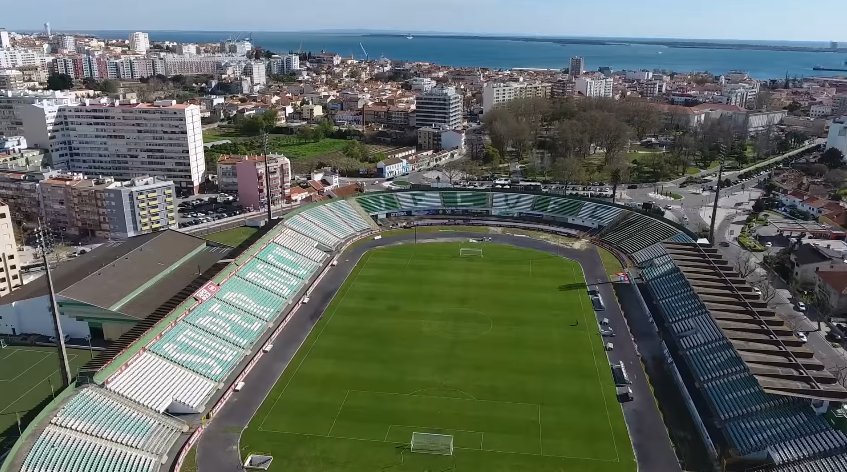
Aerial view of the stadium

Vitória plays at the Estádio do Bonfim, which was inaugurated in 1962 and has a capacity of 15,497.

== Honours ==
- Taça de Portugal
  - Winners (3): 1964–65, 1966–67, 2004–05
  - Runners-up (8): 1926–27, 1942–43, 1953–54, 1961–62, 1965–66, 1967–68, 1972–73, 2005–06
- Taça da Liga
  - Winners (1): 2007–08
  - Runners-up (1): 2017–18
- Supertaça de Portugal
  - Runners-up (2): 2005, 2006
- AF Setúbal I Divisão
  - Winners (1): 2025–26
- AF Setúbal II Divisão
  - Winners (1): 2024–25
- Small Club World Cup
  - Winners (1): 1970
- Recopa Ibérica
  - Winners (1): 2005

== European Record ==
Note: Vitória FC score is always listed first.

Season	Round	Opponent	Home	Away	Agg.
UEFA Cup Winners' Cup - 1962/1963	QR	(France) Saint-Étienne	0–3	1–1	1–4
UEFA Cup Winners' Cup - 1965/1966	1R	(Denmark) AGF	1–2	1–2	2–4
Inter-Cities Fairs Cup - 1966/1967	2R	(Italy) Juventus FC	0–2	1–3	1–5
UEFA Cup Winners' Cup - 1967/1968	1R	(Norway) Fredrikstad	2–1	5–1	7–2
UEFA Cup Winners' Cup - 1967/1968	2R	(Germany) Bayern Munich	1–1	2–6	3–7
Inter-Cities Fairs Cup - 1968/1969	1R	(Northern Ireland) Linfield F.C.	3–0	3–1	6–1
Inter-Cities Fairs Cup - 1968/1969	2R	(France) Olympique Lyonnais	5–0	2–1	7–1
Inter-Cities Fairs Cup - 1968/1969	R16	(Italy) Fiorentina	3–0	1–2	4–2
Inter-Cities Fairs Cup - 1968/1969	QF	(England) Newcastle United	3–1	1–5	4–6
Inter-Cities Fairs Cup - 1969/1970	1R	(Romania) Rapid București	3–1	4–1	7–2
Inter-Cities Fairs Cup - 1969/1970	2R	(England) Liverpool	1–0	2–3	3–3 (Away goals victory)
Inter-Cities Fairs Cup - 1969/1970	R16	(Germany) Hertha BSC	1–1	0–1	1–2
Inter-Cities Fairs Cup - 1970/1971	1R	(Switzerland) Lausanne-Sport	2–1	2–0	4–1
Inter-Cities Fairs Cup - 1970/1971	2R	(Croatia) Hajduk Split	2–0	1–2	3–2
Inter-Cities Fairs Cup - 1970/1971	R16	(Belgium) Anderlecht	3–1 (a.e.t.)	1–2	4–3 (a.e.t.)
Inter-Cities Fairs Cup - 1970/1971	QF	(England) Leeds United	1–1	1–2	2–3
UEFA Cup - 1971/1972	1R	(France) Nîmes	1–0	1–2	2–2 (Away goals victory)
UEFA Cup - 1971/1972	2R	(Soviet Union) Spartak Moskva	4–0	0–0	4–0
UEFA Cup - 1971/1972	R16	(Romania) UTA Arad	1–0	0–3	1–3
UEFA Cup - 1972/1973	1R	(Poland) Zagłębie Sosnowiec	6–1	0–1	6–2
UEFA Cup - 1972/1973	2R	(Italy) Fiorentina	1–0	1–2	2–2 (Away goals victory)
UEFA Cup - 1972/1973	R16	(Italy) Inter Milan	2–0	0–1	2–1
UEFA Cup - 1972/1973	QF	(England) Tottenham Hotspur	2–1	0–1	2–2 (Away goals defeat)
UEFA Cup - 1973/1974	1R	(Belgium) K Beerschot	2–0	2–0	4–0
UEFA Cup - 1973/1974	2R	(Belgium) RWD Molenbeek	1–0	1–2	2–2 (Away goals victory)
UEFA Cup - 1973/1974	R16	(England) Leeds United	3–1	0–1	3–2
UEFA Cup - 1973/1974	QF	(Germany) VfB Stuttgart	2–2	0–1	2–3
UEFA Cup - 1974/1975	1R	(Spain) Real Zaragoza	1–1	0–4	0–4
Intertoto Cup - 1975	GS	(Czech Republic) Baník Ostrava	2–1	0–1	2nd
Intertoto Cup - 1975	GS	(Socialist Federal Republic of Yugoslavia) Čelik Zenica	2–1	1–1	2nd
Intertoto Cup - 1975	GS	(Sweden) Elfsborg	1–0	1–1	2nd
UEFA Cup - 1999/2000	1R	(Italy) AS Roma	1–0	0–7	1–7
UEFA Cup - 2005/2006	1R	(Italy) Sampdoria	1–1	0–1	1–2
UEFA Cup - 2006/2007	1R	(Netherlands) Heerenveen	0–3	0–0	0–3
UEFA Cup - 2008/2009	1R	(Netherlands) Heerenveen	1–1	2–5	3–6

== Players ==
=== Current squad ===
As of 8 June 2024

Note: Flags indicate national team as defined under FIFA eligibility rules; some limited exceptions apply. Players may hold more than one non-FIFA nationality.

No.	Pos.	Nation	Player
1	GK	ITA	Riccardo Galli
3	DF	POR	Guilherme Santos
4	DF	POR	Lourenço Henriques
5	DF	POR	Antonio Montez
6	DF	POR	Gonçalo Maria
7	FW	POR	Joca
8	MF	POR	Mauro Antunes
9	FW	BRA	Heliardo
10	FW	BRA	Caleb
11	FW	BRA	Flavinho Júnior
13	GK	HKG	Yee-Sun Ng
19	FW	POR	Leonardo Chão
20	MF	POR	Daniel Carvalho

No.	Pos.	Nation	Player
21	FW	POR	Tuga
22	MF	POR	João Marouca
23	DF	POR	Joel Monteiro
24	GK	POR	Tiago Neto
25	DF	POR	Tiago Duque
33	FW	POR	Tiago Nascimento
61	DF	POR	Samir Banjai
72	DF	POR	Diogo Martins
77	MF	CAN	Ryan Omrani
79	DF	POR	Francisco Ascenso
88	MF	POR	Paulo Lima
99	FW	POR	Pedro Catarino

=== Out on loan ===
Note: Flags indicate national team as defined under FIFA eligibility rules; some limited exceptions apply. Players may hold more than one non-FIFA nationality.

No.	Pos.	Nation	Player

=== Coaching staff and management ===
Position	Name
Head coach	(Portugal) José Pedro
Assistant coach	(Portugal) Paulo Martins
Assistant coach	(Portugal) Jaime Coelho
Goalkeeper coach	(Portugal) Alemão
Physical coach	(Portugal) Marco Tanganho
Video analyst	(Portugal) Eduardo Marques
Training Coordinator	(Portugal) Carlos Chaby
Physiotherapist	(Portugal) Nuno Pinto
Sports Director	(Portugal) Carlos André
Director of Football	(Portugal) Edinho
General Manager of Football	(Portugal) André Dias
Team Manager	(Portugal) Alexandre Silva
