= B-SAD =

Portuguese football club (2018–2024)

- Nicknames: Azuis, sadE
- Founded: 30 June 2018
- Dissolved: 25 September 2024
- Ground: Campo de Jogos do Pragal
- Capacity: 2,500
Home colours	Away colours	Third colours

B-SAD was a Portuguese professional football club based in Almada, which existed between 2018 and 2024. It originated from the professional football company (SAD; Sociedade Anónima Desportiva) formerly associated with Clube de Futebol Os Belenenses, following a legal and institutional separation between the historic club and its SAD in 2018. Competing initially under the name Belenenses SAD, the club played four seasons in the Primeira Liga between 2018 and 2022, before successive relegations to Liga Portugal 2 and Liga 3.

After a failed merger attempt with Cova da Piedade in 2023, B-SAD was excluded from the national league system and continued in the Setúbal Football Association district competitions. In September 2024, the club was dissolved following a merger with Club Desportivo Portalegrense, formally ending its existence as an independent sporting entity. In December 2024, Os Belenenses confirmed a comprehensive legal settlement that definitively separated the historic club's identity, honours, and symbols from the defunct SAD.

== Background and legal status ==
Historic football club C.F. Os Belenenses created its SAD (Sociedade Anónima Desportiva; Public limited sports company) on 1 July 1999, to run its professional football section. In 2012, with both club and SAD facing enormous financial troubles, club members voted to sell 51% of its SAD to an investor, Codecity, led by Rui Pedro Soares. Added to the stock purchase, a parasocial deal was struck where the founding club could keep special rights, such as veto power over certain SAD decisions and the power to buy its stock back. Also a protocol was agreed upon that would regulate relations between Club and SAD. The club would keep 10% of SAD stocks.

Meanwhile, Codecity terminated the parasocial deal, alleging contractual violations by the club. In 2017, the Court of Arbitration for Sport deemed the termination of the deal valid, ending the possibility of the Club being able to reacquire the 51% of SAD stocks, in order to regain control of its professional football section.

With tensions mounting between Club and SAD, the protocol that regulated relations between both entities expired on 30 June 2018, ceasing any relationship between both parties. This included the use of Estádio do Restelo (property of the club) by the SAD's professional football team. This led to the creation of Belenenses SAD as a separate entity, founded on 1 July 2018, after the secession of the SAD from the club. They joined the Lisbon Football Association as member number 1198 (the original Belenenses is member number 64).

Belenenses' historic achievements, such as the victories in the 1945–46 Campeonato Nacional, its 3 Taças de Portugal and 3 Campeonatos de Portugal, solely belong to the club, since they were won before the creation of the SAD in 1999. The club created its own football team that started playing in the Lisbon FA regional leagues from 2018 to 2019 season. Belenenses SAD meanwhile claimed the place of the club in the Primeira Liga. Given that Estádio do Restelo was property of the club, Belenenses SAD was left without its own stadium. As a consequence, they started playing home games at the Estádio Nacional in Oeiras, paying rent to the state to use it.

In October 2018, Belenenses SAD was prohibited from using the name, cross and symbols of the original Belenenses by an intellectual property court decision. As such, after a judicial confirmation of this decision in March 2019, the new club unveiled a separate badge to differentiate itself from the original club. In March 2022, Portugal's Constitutional Court ordered B-SAD to pay over €30,000 in compensation to C.F. Os Belenenses for the youth development of the player Nilton Varela.

In May 2022, Belenenses SAD reached an agreement to rent the Estádio das Seixas from Lisbon Football Association District League club Atlético Malveira in Malveira, Mafra. The landlord club denied rumours that the two teams were going to merge. Two months later, the club stopped using the name "Belenenses", and confirmed its name as B-SAD.

On 7 March 2023, the boards of B-SAD and C.D. Cova da Piedade approved a merger, with the new club assuming B-SAD's league position but taking on the name, identity and facilities of the latter. Cova da Piedade had not played senior football in two years since being expelled for administrative reasons from the second tier. B-SAD president Rui Pedro Soares said that the merger would be beneficial as his club's gymnasium and laundry had previously been several kilometers from their stadium. However, their place in Liga 3 was denied by the Portuguese Football Federation and the merger was overturned. Following its exclusion from the national league system, B-SAD enrolled in the Setúbal FA district divisions from the 2023–24 season. Financial and structural instability continued, and on 25 September 2024 it was announced that B-SAD would merge with Club Desportivo Portalegrense, resulting in the dissolution of B-SAD as an independent sporting entity. The company ceased to exist under its former identity and became Club Desportivo Portalegrense, SAD, formally ending the existence of B-SAD as a separate club.

On 23 December 2024, C.F. Os Belenenses confirmed that it had reached a comprehensive legal settlement with the former B-SAD, thereby concluding all outstanding disputes that had been ongoing since 2018. In an official statement, the Lisbon club clarified that the former SAD no longer held any rights to the name, emblem, symbols, anthem, motto, or historical legacy of Belenenses, marking the definitive and judicially recognised separation between the historic club and the defunct SAD entity.

== Footballing history ==
Under manager Silas, B-SAD played its first game on 28 July 2018, a 3–1 home win over U.D. Oliveirense in the first round of the Taça da Liga, with Fredy scoring the first goal. The team's first Primeira Liga game was a win at C.D. Tondela on 11 August with the only goal coming from the same player. In February 2019, due to a temporary unavailability of the Estádio Nacional, B-SAD rented Estádio do Bonfim, around sixty kilometres away in Setúbal, for two home games. The game against Moreirense F.C. at this ground on 4 February was attended by 298 spectators, the lowest in the history of the league.

Silas was dismissed in September 2019, being replaced by under-23 manager Pedro Ribeiro, who quit in January with the team one point above the relegation positions. Former Portugal international Petit replaced him, reaching the quarter-finals of the Taça de Portugal in 2020–21, where the team were eliminated 3–1 by S.L. Benfica.

On 19 October 2021, having needed a goal in the last minute of extra time to defeat minnows Berço SC in the cup, Petit resigned with eight months of his contract remaining. The team had earned four points and no wins in the first eight games of the league campaign. In November, under his replacement Filipe Cândido, the team fielded just 9 available players including two goalkeepers in a league match against Benfica, due to an outbreak of Omicron variant. This resulted to a 7–0 loss at halftime and the match was eventually abandoned in the early minutes of the second half. Youth manager Franclim Carvalho was promoted to the first team in January as the third manager of a season that ended in relegation to the second tier with a last place finish in the first tier.

B-SAD played for one season in Liga Portugal 2, coming 16th and qualifying for the promotion/relegation playoff. The team had the season's worst defence, conceding 59 goals in 34 games. In the play-off, its final games before the merger with Cova da Piedade, the team lost 2–1 on aggregate to Länk FC Vilaverdense to begin its new life in Liga 3. However, after a failed merger with Cova da Piedade, their license was revoked and B-SAD subsequently reformed and relocated to Almada to play in the Setúbal district championships, the lowest tier of Portuguese football.

== League and cup history ==
Season		Pos.	Pl.	W	D	L	GS	GA	P	Cup	League Cup
2018–19	1D	9	34	10	3	11	42	51	43	Fourth round	Third round
2019–20	1D	15	34	9	8	17	27	54	35	Fourth round	Second round
2020–21	1D	10	34	9	13	12	25	25	40	Quarter-finals	Did not participate
2021–22	1D	18	34	5	11	18	23	55	26	Fifth round	First round
2022–23	2D	16	34	9	8	17	41	59	35	Quarter-finals	Group stage

== See also ==
- Milton Keynes Dons
- CSA Steaua București
