= List of Portuguese football transfers summer 2021 =

This is a list of Portuguese football transfers for the summer of 2021. The summer transfer window will open 1 July and close at midnight on 31 August. Players may be bought before the transfer windows opens, but may only join their new club on 1 July. Only moves involving Primeira Liga clubs are listed. Additionally, players without a club may join a club at any time.

== Transfers ==
Date	Name	Moving from	Moving to	Fee
18 February 2021	(Brazil) Pepê	(Brazil) Grêmio	Porto	€15m
9 March 2021	(Angola) Bruno Gaspar	Sporting CP	(Canada) Vancouver Whitecaps	Loan
28 April 2021	(Portugal) Iuri Medeiros	(Germany) 1. FC Nürnberg	Braga	Undisclosed
10 May 2021	(Mali) Moussa Marega	Porto	(Saudi Arabia) Al Hilal	Free
14 May 2021	(Portugal) Claude Gonçalves	Gil Vicente	(Bulgaria) Ludogorets Razgrad	Free
24 May 2021	(Portugal) Danilo Pereira	Porto	(France) Paris Saint-Germain	€16m
28 May 2021	(Brazil) Matheus Costa	Vizela	Marítimo	Free
3 June 2021	(Portugal) Marcos Silva	Águeda	Marítimo	Undisclosed
9 June 2021	(Brazil) Pedrinho	Benfica	(Ukraine) Shakhtar Donetsk	€18m
10 June 2021	(Portugal) Samuel Costa	Braga	(Spain) Almería	€5.25m
11 June 2021	(Portugal) André Vidigal	(Netherlands) Fortuna Sittard	Marítimo	Undisclosed
12 June 2021	(Brazil) Henrique	(Bulgaria) CSKA Sofia	Marítimo	Undisclosed
16 June 2021	(Portugal) Fábio Cardoso	Santa Clara	Porto	€2.2m
18 June 2021	(Morocco) Mohamed Bouldini	Académica de Coimbra	Santa Clara	Undisclosed
18 June 2021	(Portugal) Tomás Silva	Sporting CP	Vizela	Undisclosed
19 June 2021	(Portugal) Nuno Moreira	Sporting CP	Vizela	Undisclosed
20 June 2021	(São Tomé and Príncipe) Harramiz	Estoril Praia	(Azerbaijan) Neftçi Baki	Undisclosed
21 June 2021	(Portugal) Paulo Henrique	Penafiel	Santa Clara	Undisclosed
21 June 2021	(Russia) Stanislav Kritsyuk	Belenenses SAD	Gil Vicente	Undisclosed
22 June 2021	(Brazil) Matheus Bueno	(Brazil) Coritiba	Gil Vicente	Undisclosed
22 June 2021	(Portugal) Artur Jorge	(Cyprus) APEOL	Moreirense	Undisclosed
22 June 2021	(Portugal) André Moreira	Belenenses SAD	(Switzerland) Grasshoppers	Undisclosed
22 June 2021	(Portugal) Bruno Wilson	Braga	Vizela	Undisclosed
23 June 2021	(France) Bilel Aouacheria	Farense	Gil Vicente	Free
23 June 2021	(Portugal) Tiago Esgaio	Belenenses SAD	Braga	Undisclosed
23 June 2021	(Portugal) Ricardo Fernandes	Académico de Viseu	Santa Clara	Undisclosed
23 June 2021	(Portugal) André Ferreira	Santa Clara	Paços de Ferreira	Undisclosed
23 June 2021	(Serbia) Đorđe Jovičić	Braga	(Slovakia) Trenčín	Loan
24 June 2021	(Brazil) Caju	Braga	(Cyprus) Aris Limassol	Loan
24 June 2021	(Portugal) Filipe Cardoso	Sporting da Covilhã	Marítimo	Undisclosed
24 June 2021	(Portugal) Zé Carlos	Braga	Gil Vicente	Loan
24 June 2021	(Brazil) Lucas Mineiro	(Brazil) Chapecoense	Braga	Undisclosed
24 June 2021	(Brazil) Rodrigo Pinho	Marítimo	Benfica	Free
25 June 2021	(Portugal) Gil Dias	(France) Monaco	Benfica	Undisclosed
25 June 2021	(Brazil) Élder Santana	Sanjoanense	Gil Vicente	Free
26 June 2021	(Spain) Fran Navarro	(Spain) Valencia	Gil Vicente	Free
28 June 2021	(Nigeria) Tyronne Ebuehi	Benfica	(Italy) Venezia	Loan
28 June 2021	(Croatia) Nikola Jambor	Rio Ave	Moreirense	Undisclosed
28 June 2021	(Portugal) Paulo Oliveira	(Spain) Eibar	Braga	Undisclosed
29 June 2021	(Portugal) David Tavares	Benfica	Famalicão	Undisclosed
30 June 2021	(Brazil) Lucas Cunha	Braga	Gil Vicente	Undisclosed
1 July 2021	(Ghana) Malik Abubakari	Moreirense	(Sweden) Malmö	Undisclosed
1 July 2021	(Brazil) Charles	Marítimo	Vizela	Undisclosed
1 July 2021	(Chile) Juan Delgado	(Mexico) Necaxa	Paços de Ferreira	Undisclosed
1 July 2021	(Spain) Mario González	(Spain) Villarreal	Braga	Undisclosed
1 July 2021	(Ghana) Emmanuel Hackman	Portimonense	Gil Vicente	Undisclosed
1 July 2021	(Guinea-Bissau) Simão Júnior	Cova da Piedade	Estoril	Undisclosed
1 July 2021	(Brazil) Rodrigão	Gil Vicente	(Russia) Sochi	Undisclosed
2 July 2021	(Georgia (country)) Giorgi Aburjania	(Spain) Cartagena	Gil Vicente	Free
2 July 2021	(Brazil) Lucas Áfrico	Marítimo	Estoril	Undisclosed
2 July 2021	(Ghana) Kennedy Boateng	(Austria) Ried	Santa Clara	Free
2 July 2021	(Portugal) Rogério Santos	Braga	Trofense	Undisclosed
3 July 2021	(Senegal) Racine Coly	(France) Nice	Estoril	Undisclosed
3 July 2021	(Portugal) Ricardo Esgaio	Braga	Sporting CP	€5.5m
3 July 2021	(United States) Alex Mendez	(United States) Jong Ajax	Vizela	Undisclosed
5 July 2021	(Burkina Faso) Trova Boni	(Belgium) Mechelen	Belenenses SAD	Free
5 July 2021	(Argentina) Franco Cervi	Benfica	(Spain) Celta de Vigo	Undisclosed
6 July 2021	(Portugal) Bruno Costa	Portimonense	Porto	Undisclosed
6 July 2021	(Brazil) Caio Lucas	Benfica	(United Arab Emirates) Sharjah	Undisclosed
6 July 2021	(Brazil) Guilherme Schettine	Braga	Vizela	Loan
6 July 2021	(Portugal) João Vigário	Nacional	Paços de Ferreira	Undisclosed
7 July 2021	(Portugal) Tiago Dantas	Benfica	Tondela	Loan
7 July 2021	(Brazil) Henrique Jocú	Benfica	Portimonense	Undisclosed
8 July 2021	(Croatia) Toni Borevković	Rio Ave	Vitória de Guimarães	Undisclosed
8 July 2021	(Portugal) David Bruno	(Romania) Astra Giurgiu	Estoril	Undisclosed
8 July 2021	(Brazil) Denílson	(Brazil) Atlético Mineiro	Paços de Ferreira	Undisclosed
8 July 2021	(Portugal) Diogo Motty	Santa Clara	União de Santarém	Loan
8 July 2021	(Portugal) Vasco Paciência	Benfica	(Switzerland) Grasshoppers	Loan
9 July 2021	(Brazil) Vítor Costa	(Brazil) CSA	Marítimo	Undisclosed
9 July 2021	(England) Jacob Maddox	Vitória de Guimarães	(England) Burton Albion	Loan
10 July 2021	(Iran) Alireza Beiranvand	(Belgium) Royal Antwerp	Boavista	Loan
10 July 2021	(Belgium) Anthony D'Alberto	Moreirense	(Denmark) AGF Aarhus	Free
10 July 2021	(Brazil) Murilo	Braga	Gil Vicente	Undisclosed
10 July 2021	(Portugal) Nuno Tavares	Benfica	(England) Arsenal	£8m
10 July 2021	(Portugal) Rúben Vinagre	(England) Wolverhampton Wanderers	Sporting CP	Loan
11 July 2021	(Portugal) Nuno Santos	Benfica	Paços de Ferreira	Loan
12 July 2021	(Portugal) Filipe Ferreira	Tondela	Boavista	Undisclosed
13 July 2021	(Colombia) Cristian Borja	Braga	(Turkey) Alanyaspor	Loan
13 July 2021	(Brazil) Daniel dos Anjos	Benfica	Tondela	Undisclosed
13 July 2021	(Netherlands) Godfried Frimpong	Benfica	Moreirense	Undisclosed
13 July 2021	(Brazil) Jhonatan	Vitória de Guimarães	Rio Ave	Loan
13 July 2021	(Portugal) João Mário	(Italy) Inter Milan	Benfica	Free
13 July 2021	(Portugal) Xadas	Braga	Marítimo	Undisclosed
14 July 2021	(Brazil) Jean	Marítimo	Gil Vicente	Free
14 July 2021	(Brazil) Flávio Ramos	Feirense	Paços de Ferreira	Undisclosed
14 July 2021	(Argentina) Iván Rossi	(Italy) Sambenedettese	Marítimo	Undisclosed
15 July 2021	(South Africa) Lyle Foster	Vitória de Guimarães	(Belgium) Westerlo	Loan
15 July 2021	(Brazil) Renato Júnior	(Brazil) Água Santa	Portimonense	Loan
15 July 2021	(Portugal) André Mesquita	Santa Clara	Vitória de Setúbal	Loan
16 July 2021	(Brazil) Carlinhos	(Brazil) Vasco da Gama	Portimonense	Free
16 July 2021	(Spain) Manu Hernando	(Spain) Real Madrid Castilla	Tondela	Undisclosed
16 July 2021	(Portugal) Pedro Mendes	Sporting CP	Rio Ave	Loan
17 July 2021	(Portugal) Hugo Basto	Estoril Praia	(Azerbaijan) Neftçi Baki	Undisclosed
19 July 2021	(Brazil) Andrew	(Brazil) Botafogo	Gil Vicente	Undisclosed
19 July 2021	(Portugal) João Caiado	Famalicão	Gil Vicente	Undisclosed
19 July 2021	(Israel) Dor Jan	Paços de Ferreira	(Israel) Maccabi Petah Tikva	Loan
19 July 2021	(Croatia) Filip Krovinović	Benfica	(Croatia) Hajduk Split	Undisclosed
20 July 2021	(Serbia) Marko Grujić	(England) Liverpool	Porto	£10.5m
21 July 2021	(Colombia) Leonardo Acevedo	Sporting CP	Estoril	Free
21 July 2021	(Brazil) Bruno Rodrigues	(Brazil) Tombense	Famalicão	Loan
22 July 2021	(Portugal) Rodrigo Conceição	Porto	Moreirense	Loan
22 July 2021	(Curaçao) Kenji Gorré	Nacional	Boavista	Undsiclosed
23 July 2021	(France) Dylan Batubinsika	(Belgium) Royal Antwerp	Famalicão	Undisclosed
23 July 2021	(Brazil) Erick	Braga	(Brazil) Ceará	Undisclosed
23 July 2021	(Senegal) Mamadou Loum	Porto	(Spain) Alavés	Loan
23 July 2021	(France) Soualiho Meïté	(Italy) Torino	Benfica	Undisclosed
23 July 2021	(Portugal) Hugo Oliveira	Oliveirense	Vizela	Undisclosed
23 July 2021	(Portugal) Pedro Pereira	Benfica	(Italy) Monza	Loan
23 July 2021	(Portugal) Eduardo Quaresma	Sporting CP	Tondela	Loan
23 July 2021	(Mali) Kévin Zohi	(France) Strasbourg	Vizela	Undisclosed
26 July 2021	(Uruguay) Rodrigo Abascal	(Uruguay) Peñarol	Boavista	Undsiclosed
26 July 2021	(Brazil) Igor Julião	(Brazil) Fluminense	Vizela	Undisclosed
26 July 2021	(Portugal) Rui Pires	(France) Troyes	Paços de Ferreira	Loan
27 July 2021	(Brazil) Claudemir	(Turkey) Sivasspor	Vizela	Undisclosed
27 July 2021	(Republic of the Congo) Gaius Makouta	Braga	Boavista	Undsiclosed
27 July 2021	(Brazil) Paulinho	Boavista	(Saudi Arabia) Al Shabab	Undsiclosed
28 July 2021	(Portugal) Vitorino Antunes	Sporting CP	Paços de Ferreira	Undisclosed
28 July 2021	(Norway) Noah Holm	Vitória de Guimarães	(Norway) Rosenborg	Undisclosed
28 July 2021	(Spain) Jorge Sáenz	(Spain) Valencia	Marítimo	Loan
29 July 2021	(Azerbaijan) Renat Dadashov	(England) Wolverhampton Wanderers	Tondela	Loan
29 July 2021	(Portugal) André Liberal	Famalicão	Gil Vicente	Undisclosed
29 July 2021	(Guinea-Bissau) Alfa Semedo	Benfica	Vitória de Guimarães	€1.5m
29 July 2021	(England) Easah Suliman	Vitória de Guimarães	Nacional	Loan
31 July 2021	(France) Hamidou Keyta	(Romania) Botoșani	Santa Clara	Undisclosed
31 July 2021	(Ghana) Abdul-Aziz Yakubu	Vitória de Guimarães	Rio Ave	Loan
31 July 2021	(Ukraine) Roman Yaremchuk	(Belgium) Gent	Benfica	Undisclosed
2 August 2021	(Japan) Ryotaro Meshino	(England) Manchester City	Estoril Praia	Loan
3 August 2021	(Brazil) Ricardo Ryller	Braga	(Saudi Arabia) Al-Fayha	Undisclosed
4 August 2021	(Portugal) Ricardo Mangas	Boavista	(France) Bordeaux	Loan
4 August 2021	(Portugal) Pedro Marques	Sporting CP	Famalicão	Loan
6 August 2021	(Venezuela) Nahuel Ferraresi	(England) Manchester City	Estoril Praia	Loan
6 August 2021	(Spain) Iker Undabarrena	(Spain) Sabadell	Tondela	Undisclosed
6 August 2021	(Brazil) Paulo Victor	(Brazil) Grêmio	Marítimo	Undisclosed
7 August 2021	(Brazil) Neto Borges	(Belgium) Genk	Tondela	Loan
7 August 2021	(Portugal) Pêpê Rodrigues	(Greece) Olympiacos	Famalicão	Loan
7 August 2021	(Portugal) Tiago Silva	(Greece) Olympiacos	Vitória de Guimarães	Undisclosed
9 August 2021	(Mozambique) Clésio	(Azerbaijan) Zira	Marítimo	Undisclosed
10 August 2021	(Portugal) Didi	Vizela	Sanjoanense	Undisclosed
10 August 2021	(Uruguay) Manuel Ugarte	Famalicão	Sporting CP	Undisclosed
11 August 2021	(Brazil) Pedrão	(Brazil) Palmeiras	Portimonense	Loan
11 August 2021	(Portugal) Adriano Castanheira	Paços de Ferreira	Chaves	Loan
12 August 2021	(France) Franck-Yves Bambock	Marítimo	(France) Grenoble	Undisclosed
13 August 2021	(Argentina) Hernán De La Fuente	(Argentina) Vélez Sarsfield	Famalicão	Undisclosed
16 August 2021	(Croatia) Tomislav Štrkalj	Tondela	(Croatia) Hrvatski Dragovoljac	Loan
16 August 2021	(Sweden) Philip Tear	Somorrostro	Tondela	Undisclosed
17 August 2021	(Brazil) Alex	(Brazil) Santos	Famalicão	Loan
17 August 2021	(Ecuador) Johan Mina	(Germany) Werder Bremen	Estoril Praia	Loan
17 August 2021	(Portugal) Manuel Namora	Rio Ave	Boavista	Undsiclosed
17 August 2021	(Iran) Payam Niazmand	(Iran) Sepahan	Portimonense	Undisclosed
17 August 2021	(Portugal) Paulinho	Gil Vicente	Moreirense	Undisclosed
17 August 2021	(Montenegro) Ilija Vukotić	Benfica	Boavista	Loan
17 August 2021	(Brazil) Patrick William	Famalicão	Estoril Praia	Loan
18 August 2021	(Portugal) Pedro Brazão	(France) Nice	Famalicão	Undisclosed
18 August 2021	(South Africa) Luther Singh	Braga	(Denmark) Copenhagen	Undisclosed
19 August 2021	(Portugal) Tiago Ilori	Sporting CP	Boavista	Loan
19 August 2021	(Portugal) João Novais	Braga	(Turkey) Alanyaspor	Loan
19 August 2021	(Brazil) Wendell	(Germany) Bayer Leverkusen	Porto	Undisclosed
20 August 2021	(Guinea-Bissau) João Jaquité	Tondela	Vilafranquense	Undisclosed
21 August 2021	(Brazil) Yan Couto	(England) Manchester City	Braga	Loan
22 August 2021	(Brazil) Carlos	Santa Clara	(Saudi Arabia) Al Shabab	Undisclosed
22 August 2021	(Switzerland) Charles Pickel	(France) Grenoble	Famalicão	Undisclosed
22 August 2021	(Germany) Luca Waldschmidt	Benfica	(Germany) VfL Wolfsburg	Undisclosed
24 August 2021	(Honduras) Alberth Elis	Boavista	(France) Bordeaux	Loan
24 August 2021	(Brazil) Iago Maidana	(Brazil) Atlético Mineiro	Gil Vicente	Loan
24 August 2021	(Iran) Shahriyar Moghanlou	Santa Clara	(Iran) Sepahan	Swap Deal
24 August 2021	(Iran) Mohammad Mohebi	(Iran) Sepahan	Santa Clara	Swap Deal
24 August 2021	(Brazil) Marcus Paulo	(Spain) Atlético Madrid	Famalicão	Loan
24 August 2021	(Serbia) Nemanja Radonjić	(France) Marseille	Benfica	Loan
24 August 2021	(France) Adil Rami	Boavista	(France) Troyes	Undisclosed
24 August 2021	(Portugal) João Virgínia	(England) Everton	Sporting CP	Loan
25 August 2021	(Portugal) Tiago Esgaio	Braga	Arouca	Loan
25 August 2021	(Brazil) Fransérgio	Braga	(France) Bordeaux	Undisclosed
25 August 2021	(Croatia) Petar Musa	(Czech Republic) Slavia Prague	Boavista	Loan
25 August 2021	(Japan) Shoya Nakajima	Porto	Portimonense	Loan
26 August 2021	(Colombia) Mateo Cassierra	Belenenses SAD	(Russia) Sochi	Undisclosed
26 August 2021	(Morocco) Achraf Lazaar	(England) Watford	Portimonense	Free
27 August 2021	(Portugal) Miguel Luís	Vitória de Guimarães	(Poland) Raków Częstochowa	Undisclosed
27 August 2021	(Brazil) Pedro Henrique	Vitória de Guimarães	(Brazil) Atlético Goianiense	Loan
28 August 2021	(Brazil) Ewerton	Porto	Portimonense	Undisclosed
28 August 2021	(Brazil) Pablo	Braga	Moreirense	Loan
29 August 2021	(Turkey) Gürkan Başkan	(Turkey) Fenerbahçe	Famalicão	Undisclosed
29 August 2021	(Brazil) Arthur Gomes	(Brazil) Santos	Estoril Praia	Undisclosed
30 August 2021	(Uruguay) Juan Manuel Boselli	(Uruguay) Defensor	Tondela	Undisclosed
30 August 2021	(France) Rafik Guitane	(France) Reims	Marítimo	Loan
30 August 2021	(Nigeria) Abraham Marcus	(Nigeria) Remo Stars	Portimonense	Loan
30 August 2021	(Spain) Adrián Marín	(Spain) Granada	Famalicão	Loan
30 August 2021	(Brazil) Luiz Phellype	Sporting CP	Santa Clara	Loan
30 August 2021	(Portugal) Leandro Sanca	Braga	(Italy) Spezia	€500k
30 August 2021	(Uruguay) Gustavo Viera	Santa Clara	(Uruguay) Fénix	Loan
31 August 2021	(Mauritania) Souleymane Anne	Tondela	(Belgium) Virton	Free
31 August 2021	(Nigeria) Chidozie Awaziem	Porto	Boavista	Undisclosed
31 August 2021	(France) Simon Banza	(France) Lens	Famalicão	Loan
31 August 2021	(Romania) Andrei Chindriș	(Romania) Botoșani	Santa Clara	Undisclosed
31 August 2021	(Portugal) Chiquinho	Benfica	Braga	Loan
31 August 2021	(Guinea-Bissau) Marcelo Djaló	(Spain) Lugo	Boavista	Free
31 August 2021	(Ivory Coast) Idrissa Doumbia	Sporting CP	(Belgium) Zulte Waregem	Loan
31 August 2021	(Portugal) João Ferreira	Benfica	Vitória de Guimarães	Loan
31 August 2021	(Portugal) Florentino	Benfica	(Spain) Getafe	Loan
31 August 2021	(Portugal) Rui Fonte	Braga	Estoril Praia	Free
31 August 2021	(Portugal) Jota	Benfica	(Scotland) Celtic	Loan
31 August 2021	(Austria) Valentino Lazaro	(Italy) Inter	Benfica	Loan
31 August 2021	(Portugal) Diogo Leite	Porto	Braga	Loan
31 August 2021	(Italy) Simone Muratore	(Italy) Atalanta	Tondela	Loan
31 August 2021	(Colombia) Sebastián Pérez	(Argentina) Boca Juniors	Boavista	Undisclosed
31 August 2021	(France) Modibo Sagnan	(Spain) Real Sociedad	Tondela	Loan
31 August 2021	(Brazil) Nathan Santos	(Brazil) Vasco da Gama	Boavista	Undisclosed
31 August 2021	(Slovenia) Andraž Šporar	Sporting CP	(England) Middlesbrough	Loan
31 August 2021	(Slovenia) Igor Vekić	(Slovenia) Bravo	Paços de Ferreira	Loan
31 August 2021	(Brazil) Carlos Vinícius	Benfica	(Netherlands) PSV	Loan
1 September 2021	(Portugal) Romário Baró	Porto	Estoril Praia	Loan
1 September 2021	(Colombia) Juan Calero	(Mexico) Pachuca	Gil Vicente	Loan
1 September 2021	(Spain) Pablo Sarabia	(France) Paris Saint-Germain	Sporting CP	Loan
1 September 2021	(Portugal) António Xavier	(Greece) Panathinaikos	Estoril Praia	Loan
2 September 2021	(Russia) Stanislav Kritsyuk	Gil Vicente	(Russia) Zenit	Undisclosed
3 September 2021	(Slovenia) Žiga Frelih	(Slovenia) Olimpija Ljubljana	Gil Vicente	Undisclosed
3 September 2021	(Portugal) Joel Sousa	Tondela	Oleiros	Loan
4 September 2021	(Cameroon) Paul-Georges Ntep	(France) EA Guingamp	Boavista	Free
6 September 2021	(Portugal) Miguel Crespo	Estoril Praia	(Turkey) Fenerbahçe	Undisclosed
9 September 2021	(Portugal) Pedro Martelo	Paços de Ferreira	Amora	Loan
10 September 2021	(Portugal) José Oliveira	Paços de Ferreira	Sanjoanense	Loan
