= 2021–22 Gil Vicente F.C. season =

Gil Vicente
2021–22 season
- Chairman: Francisco Dias da Silva
- Manager: Ricardo Soares
- Stadium: Estádio Cidade de Barcelos
- Primeira Liga: 5th
- Taça de Portugal: Fourth round
- Taça da Liga: Second round
| Home colours | Away colours | Third colours |

The 2021–22 season is the 72nd season in the existence of Gil Vicente F.C. and the club's third consecutive season in the top flight of Portuguese football. In addition to the domestic league, Gil Vicente F.C. participated in this season's editions of the Taça de Portugal and the Taça da Liga.

== Players ==
=== First-team squad ===
As of 30 July 2021

Note: Flags indicate national team as defined under FIFA eligibility rules; some limited exceptions apply. Players may hold more than one non-FIFA nationality.

| No. | Pos. | Nation | Player |
|---|---|---|---|
| 1 | GK | RUS | Stanislav Kritsyuk |
| 2 | DF | POR | Zé Carlos (on loan from Sporting Braga) |
| 3 | DF | BRA | Lucas Cunha |
| 4 | DF | BRA | Diogo Silva |
| 5 | DF | TOG | Emmanuel Hackman |
| 6 | MF | BRA | João Afonso |
| 7 | FW | FRA | Bilel Aouacheria |
| 8 | MF | POR | Pedrinho |
| 9 | FW | ESP | Fran Navarro |
| 10 | MF | JPN | Kanya Fujimoto (on loan from Tokyo Verdy) |
| 11 | FW | FRA | Antoine Leautey |
| 12 | GK | POR | Brian Araújo |
| 15 | MF | GEO | Giorgi Aburjania |

| No. | Pos. | Nation | Player |
|---|---|---|---|
| 17 | FW | POR | Boubacar Hanne |
| 20 | MF | POR | João Caiado |
| 21 | MF | BRA | Vitor Carvalho |
| 25 | MF | BRA | Jean Irmer |
| 26 | DF | POR | Rúben Fernandes |
| 29 | FW | BRA | Samuel Lino |
| 31 | DF | POR | Talocha |
| 42 | GK | BRA | Andrew |
| 55 | DF | POR | Henrique Gomes |
| 57 | MF | BRA | Matheus Bueno |
| 77 | FW | BRA | Murilo |
| 99 | FW | POR | André Liberal |

=== Other players under contract ===
Note: Flags indicate national team as defined under FIFA eligibility rules; some limited exceptions apply. Players may hold more than one non-FIFA nationality.

| No. | Pos. | Nation | Player |
|---|---|---|---|
| — | FW | NGR | Ahmed Isaiah |
| — | FW | IRQ | Alaa Abbas |
| — | FW | BRA | Élder Santana |

| No. | Pos. | Nation | Player |
|---|---|---|---|
| — | DF | BRA | Guilherme Mantuan |
| — | FW | BRA | Miullen |
| — | DF | SEN | Souleymane Aw |

== Pre-season and friendlies ==
Win Draw Loss Fixtures

== Competitions ==
=== Overall record ===
| Competition | First match | Last match | Starting round | Final position | Record | | | | | | | |
| Competition | First match | Last match | Starting round | Final position | Pld | W | D | L | GF | GA | GD | Win % |
|---|---|---|---|---|---|---|---|---|---|---|---|---|
| Primeira Liga | 9 August 2021 | May 2022 | Matchday 1 | | 29 | 12 | 10 | 7 | 40 | 30 | +10 | 41.38 |
| Taça de Portugal | 17 October 2021 | 20 November 2021 | Third round | Fourth round | 2 | 1 | 0 | 1 | 5 | 1 | +4 | 50.00 |
| Taça da Liga | 24 July 2021 | 30 July 2021 | First round | Second round | 2 | 1 | 1 | 0 | 2 | 1 | +1 | 50.00 |
| Total | | | | | 33 | 14 | 11 | 8 | 47 | 32 | +15 | 42.42 |

Last updated: 9 April 2022
Source: Soccerway

=== Primeira Liga ===
==== League table ====
| Pos | Team | Pld | W | D | L | GF | GA | GD | Pts | Qualification or relegation |
|---|---|---|---|---|---|---|---|---|---|---|
| 3 | Benfica | 34 | 23 | 5 | 6 | 78 | 30 | +48 | 74 | Qualification for the Champions League third qualifying round |
| 4 | Braga | 34 | 19 | 8 | 7 | 52 | 31 | +21 | 65 | Qualification for the Europa League group stage (Note: Since the winners of the 2021–22 Taça de Portugal, Porto, qualified for the Champions League based on league position, the spot awarded to the fourth-placed team (Europa Conference League third qualifying round) was passed to the fifth-placed team, and the spot awarded to the fifth-placed team (Europa Conference League second qualifying round) was passed to the sixth-placed team.) |
| 5 | Gil Vicente | 34 | 13 | 12 | 9 | 47 | 42 | +5 | 51 | Qualification for the Europa Conference League third qualifying round |
| 6 | Vitória de Guimarães | 34 | 13 | 9 | 12 | 50 | 41 | +9 | 48 | Qualification for the Europa Conference League second qualifying round |
| 7 | Santa Clara | 34 | 9 | 13 | 12 | 38 | 54 | −16 | 40 | |

Source: Liga Portugal
Rules for classification: 1) Points; 2) Head-to-head points; 3) Head-to-head goal difference; 4) Head-to-head away goals scored; 5) Goal difference; 6) Matches won; 7) Goals scored; 8) Play-off.

==== Results summary ====
| Overall | | | | | | | | Home | | | | | | Away | | | | | |
| Pld | W | D | L | GF | GA | GD | Pts | W | D | L | GF | GA | GD | W | D | L | GF | GA | GD |
|---|---|---|---|---|---|---|---|---|---|---|---|---|---|---|---|---|---|---|---|
| 34 | 13 | 12 | 9 | 47 | 42 | +5 | 51 | 6 | 6 | 5 | 25 | 19 | +6 | 7 | 6 | 4 | 22 | 23 | −1 |

Last updated: 15 May 2022.
Source: Liga Portugal

==== Results by round ====
| Round | 1 | 2 | 3 | 4 | 5 | 6 | 7 | 8 | 9 | 10 | 11 | 12 | 13 | 14 | 15 | 16 | 17 | 18 | 19 | 20 | 21 | 22 | 23 | 24 | 25 | 26 | 27 | 28 | 29 | 30 | 31 | 32 | 33 | 34 |
|---|---|---|---|---|---|---|---|---|---|---|---|---|---|---|---|---|---|---|---|---|---|---|---|---|---|---|---|---|---|---|---|---|---|---|
| Ground | H | A | H | A | H | A | H | A | H | A | H | A | H | A | H | A | H | A | H | A | H | A | H | A | H | A | H | A | H | A | H | A | H | A |
| Result | W | W | L | L | D | D | L | D | L | W | D | D | W | W | L | W | W | D | W | W | D | W | W | D | D | W | D | L | L | D | D | L | W | L |
| Position | 2 | 2 | 8 | 8 | 8 | 7 | 9 | 9 | 10 | 8 | 8 | 8 | 8 | 8 | 8 | 7 | 5 | 5 | 5 | 5 | 5 | 5 | 5 | 5 | 5 | 5 | 5 | 5 | 5 | 5 | 5 | 5 | 5 | 5 |

Updated to match(es) played on 15 May 2022. Source: Liga Portugal
A = Away; H = Home; W = Win; D = Draw; L = Loss

==== Matches ====
| 9 August 2021 1 | Gil Vicente | 3–0 | Boavista | Barcelos |
| 20:15 WEST (UTC+1) | Navarro 3', 56'; Lino 24' | Report | | Stadium: Estádio Cidade de Barcelos; Attendance: 2,014; Referee: Claúdio Pereira |

| 15 August 2021 2 | Portimonense | 0–1 | Gil Vicente | Portimão |
| 15:30 WEST (UTC+1) | | Report | Lino 59' | Stadium: Estádio Municipal de Portimão; Attendance: 717; Referee: Rui Costa |

| 21 August 2021 3 | Gil Vicente | 0–2 | Benfica | Barcelos |
| 18:00 WEST (UTC+1) | Cunha (yellow card) 24'; Fujimoto (yellow card) 67'; Kritsyuk (yellow card) 75' | Report | Gilberto (yellow card) 45'; Veríssimo 84'; Grimaldo 88'; Núñez (yellow card) 90+1' | Stadium: Estádio Cidade de Barcelos; Attendance: 3,751; Referee: Nuno Almeida |

| 29 August 2021 4 | Santa Clara | 1–0 | Gil Vicente | Ponta Delgada |
| 20:30 WEST (UTC+1) | Rui Costa 12'; Ramos (yellow card) 29'; Jean Patric (yellow card) 69'; Allano (red card) 70'; Ricardinho (yellow card) 85' | Report | Aouacheria (yellow card) 53'; Fernandes (red card) 70'; Pedrinho (yellow card) 73'; Talocha (yellow card) 74'; Aburjania (yellow card) 90+3'; Cunha (yellow card) 90+6' | Stadium: Estádio de São Miguel; Attendance: 588; Referee: Hugo Silva |

| 12 September 2021 5 | Gil Vicente | 2–2 | Vizela | Barcelos |
| 18:00 WEST (UTC+1) | Hackman (yellow card) 35'; Zé Carlos (yellow card) 54'; Navarro 61', 90'; Cunha (yellow card) 90+4' | Report | Schettine (yellow card) 21'; Paulo 24' (pen.), 73'; Kouao (yellow card) 28'; Moreira (yellow card) 67' | Stadium: Estádio Cidade de Barcelos; Attendance: 2,104; Referee: Fábio Veríssimo |

| 18 September 2021 6 | Belenenses SAD | 1–1 | Gil Vicente | Leiria |
| 18:00 WEST (UTC+1) | Sithole (yellow card) 34'; Carraça (yellow card) 38'; Safira 83', (yellow card) 86' | Report | Talocha (yellow card) 4'; Pedrinho (yellow card) 12'; Carvalho (yellow card) 25'; Aburjania 90+2' | Stadium: Estádio Dr. Magalhães Pessoa; Attendance: 673; Referee: Miguel Nogueira |

| 24 September 2021 7 | Gil Vicente | 1–2 | Porto | Barcelos |
| 21:15 WEST (UTC+1) | Lino 24' | Report | Taremi 9'; Oliveira 89' | Stadium: Estádio Cidade de Barcelos; Attendance: 5,258; Referee: Artur Soares Dias |

| 3 October 2021 8 | Estoril | 2–2 | Gil Vicente | Estoril |
| 18:00 WEST (UTC+1) | Rui Fonte 11'; Rosier (yellow card) 30'; Chiquinho (yellow card) 38'; Franco 45+2' (pen.) | Report | Lino 42'; Zé Carlos (yellow card) 45'; Navarro 50'; Costa (yellow card) 65'; Leautey (yellow card) 75'; Pedrinho (yellow card) 86' | Stadium: Estádio António Coimbra da Mota; Attendance: 814; Referee: João Pinheiro |

| 25 October 2021 9 | Gil Vicente | 0–1 | Braga | Barcelos |
| 19:00 WEST (UTC+1) | | Report | Vítor Oliveira 4' | Stadium: Estádio Cidade de Barcelos; Attendance: 2,762; Referee: Tiago Martins |

| 31 October 2021 10 | Marítimo | 1–2 | Gil Vicente | Funchal |
| 15:30 WEST (UTC+1) | Xadas 45'; Winck (yellow card) 50'; Costa (yellow card) 90+2' | Report | Fujimoto 28'; Navarro (yellow card) 32'; Zé Carlos (yellow card) 54'; Cunha 67'; Carvalho (yellow card) 82'; Aburjania (yellow card) 90+2' | Stadium: Estádio do Marítimo; Attendance: 2,106; Referee: David Silva |

| 5 November 2021 11 | Gil Vicente | 1–1 | Arouca | Barcelos |
| 19:00 WET (UTC±0) | Navarro 47'; Talocha (yellow card) 70' | Report | Arsénio 16'; Quaresma (yellow card) 22'; A. Silva (yellow card) 35' (yellow-red card) 83'; Moreira (yellow card) 66'; Kouassi (yellow card) 77' | Stadium: Estádio Cidade de Barcelos; Attendance: 1,694; Referee: Hélder Malheiro |

| 26 November 2021 12 | Moreirense | 2–2 | Gil Vicente | Moreira de Cónegos |
| 20:15 WET (UTC±0) | Paulinho (yellow card) 28'; Rosić (yellow card) 47'; Yan 49' (pen.); Fábio Pacheco (yellow card) 60'; Vitória 90+6' | Report | Zé Carlos (yellow card) 9'; Vitor Carvalho (yellow card) 22'; Frelih (yellow card) 47'; Samuel Lino 68'; Fran Navarro 77'; Aouacheria (yellow card) 90+2'; Lucas Cunha (yellow card) 90+5' | Stadium: Parque de Jogos Comendador Joaquim de Almeida Freitas; Attendance: 1,015; Referee: (Portugal) Manuel Oliveira |

| 5 December 2021 13 | Gil Vicente | 4–0 | Famalicão | Barcelos |
| 18:00 WET (UTC±0) | Fujimoto 3' (yellow card) 18'; Fran Navarro 22' 76'; Hackman (yellow card) 37'; Murilo 40'; Aburjania (yellow card) 73' | Report | De La Fuente (yellow card) 25'; David Tavares (yellow card) 53'; Bruno Rodrigues (yellow card) 90+4' | Stadium: Estádio Cidade de Barcelos; Attendance: 2,117; Referee: (Portugal) Rui Costa |

| 10 December 2021 14 | Paços de Ferreira | 0–1 | Gil Vicente | Paços de Ferreira |
| 20:15 WET (UTC±0) | Denílson (yellow card) 12'; Luíz Carlos (yellow card) 26'; Ibrahim (yellow card) 77' | Report | Zé Carlos (yellow card) 40'; Vitor Carvalho (yellow card) 70'; Leautey 90+5' | Stadium: Estádio da Mata Real; Attendance: 1,542; Referee: (Portugal) Artur Soares Dias |

| 18 December 2021 15 | Gil Vicente | 0–3 | Sporting CP | Barcelos |
| 20:30 WET (UTC±0) | | Report | Santos 53'; Inácio 64'; Bragança 90+3' | Stadium: Estádio Cidade de Barcelos; Attendance: 4,730; Referee: (Portugal) Tiago Martins |

| 28 December 2021 16 | Tondela | 0–3 | Gil Vicente | Tondela |
| 17:00 WET (UTC±0) | Salvador Agra (yellow card) 31'; Ricardo Alves (yellow card) 33'; Bebeto (yellow card) 50'; Manu Hernando (yellow card) 56'; Daniel dos Anjos (yellow card) 90+2' | Report | Matheus Bueno (yellow card) 13' (goal) 77'; Lucas Cunha (yellow card) 44'; Murilo 58'; Boubacar Hanne 90+3' | Stadium: Estádio João Cardoso; Attendance: 499; Referee: (Portugal) Gustavo Correia |

| 10 January 2022 17 | Gil Vicente | 3–2 | Vitória de Guimarães | Barcelos |
| 20:15 WET (UTC±0) | Fran Navarro 21' (yellow card) 32' (goal) 53'; Leautey 75'; Frelih (yellow card) 86' | Report | André André (yellow card) 25'; Tiago Silva (yellow card) 32'; Edwards (yellow card) 63' (yellow-red card) 90' (goal) 87' (pen.); Borevković (yellow card) 72'; Nelson da Luz 79' | Stadium: Estádio Cidade de Barcelos; Attendance: 2,348; Referee: (Portugal) Manuel Oliveira |

| 15 January 2022 18 | Boavista | 1–1 | Gil Vicente | Porto |
| 15:30 WET (UTC±0) | Makouta 4'; Porozo (yellow card) 88'; De Santis (yellow card) 90+2'; Cannon (yellow card) 90+3' | Report | Samuel Lino 67'; Vitor Carvalho (yellow card) 85'; Talocha (yellow card) 90+3' | Stadium: Estádio do Bessa; Attendance: 3,355; Referee: (Portugal) Fábio Melo |

| 23 January 2022 19 | Gil Vicente | 1–0 | Portimonense | Barcelos |
| 18:00 WET (UTC±0) | Fujimoto (yellow card) 30'; Pedrinho 74'; Zé Carlos (yellow card) 86'; Aburjania (yellow card) 86' | Report | Lucas Fernandes (yellow card) 9' (yellow-red card) 24'; Pedrão (yellow card) 45'; Lucas Possignolo (yellow card) 78'; Fali Candé (yellow card) 86'; Ewerton (yellow card) 86' | Stadium: Estádio Cidade de Barcelos; Attendance: 2,233; Referee: (Portugal) João Pinheiro |

| 2 February 2022 20 | Benfica | 1–2 | Gil Vicente | Lisbon |
| 19:00 WET (UTC±0) | Vertonghen (yellow card) 8'; Otamendi (yellow card) 30'; Diogo Gonçalves (yellow card) 40'; João Mário (yellow card) 53'; Gonçalo Ramos 88' | Report | Samuel Lino 11'; Fran Navarro (yellow card) 26'; Aburjania 64'; Zé Carlos (yellow card) 68'; Andrew (yellow card) 74' | Stadium: Estádio da Luz; Attendance: 21,979; Referee: (Portugal) Artur Soares Dias |

| 6 February 2022 21 | Gil Vicente | 2–2 | Santa Clara | Barcelos |
| 15:30 WET (UTC±0) | Talocha (yellow card) 10'; Leautey (yellow card) 17'; Samuel Lino 35' (pen.); Rúben Fernandes 85' | Report | Crysan 28' (yellow card) 54' (yellow-red card) 80'; Lincoln (yellow card) 37' (yellow-red card) 66'; Talocha 78' (o.g.); Rui Costa (yellow card) 78' | Stadium: Estádio Cidade de Barcelos; Attendance: 2,955; Referee: (Portugal) Manuel Oliveira |

| 13 February 2022 22 | Vizela | 0–1 | Gil Vicente | Vizela |
| 20:30 WET (UTC±0) | Cassiano (yellow card) 20'; Osama Rashid (yellow card) 72'; Ofori (yellow card) 90+5' | Report | Fran Navarro 27' (pen.) (yellow card) 32'; Samuel Lino (yellow card) 78'; Aouacheria (yellow card) 90+1'; Élder Santana (yellow card) 90+6' | Stadium: Estádio do FC Vizela; Attendance: 2,020; Referee: (Portugal) Nuno Almeida |

| 19 February 2022 23 | Gil Vicente | 2–0 | Belenenses SAD | Barcelos |
| 15:30 WET (UTC±0) | Cunha (yellow card) 3'; Calero 68'; Santana 78'; Bueno (yellow card) 90+4' | Report | Calila (yellow card) 37'; Safira (yellow card) 43'; Henriques (yellow card) 50'; Carraça (yellow card) 85' | Stadium: Estádio Cidade de Barcelos; Attendance: 2,862; Referee: (Portugal) João Pinheiro |

| 27 February 2022 24 | Porto | 1–1 | Gil Vicente | Porto |
| 20:30 WET (UTC±0) | Evanilson 66' | Report | Navarro 62' | Stadium: Estádio do Dragão; Attendance: 38,430; Referee: (Portugal) Manuel Mota |

| 4 March 2022 25 | Gil Vicente | 0–0 | Estoril | Barcelos |
| 20:15 WET (UTC±0) | Aburjania (yellow card) 20'; Pedrinho (yellow card) 54' | Report | Raul Silva (yellow card) 88' | Stadium: Estádio Cidade de Barcelos; Attendance: 3,562; Referee: (Portugal) André Narciso |

| 13 March 2022 26 | Braga | 0–1 | Gil Vicente | Braga |
| 20:30 WET (UTC±0) | | Report | Gomes 89' | Stadium: Estádio Municipal de Braga; Attendance: 8,092; Referee: (Portugal) Luís Godinho |

| 20 March 2022 27 | Gil Vicente | 1–1 | Marítimo | Barcelos |
| 15:30 WET (UTC±0) | Talocha (yellow card) 19'; Samuel Lino (yellow card) 45' (goal) 45+5'; Aburjania (yellow card) 67' | Report | Matheus Costa (yellow card) 15'; Tagueu 39'; Vítor Costa (yellow card) 51'; Pedro Pelágio (yellow card) 90+4' | Stadium: Estádio Cidade de Barcelos; Attendance: 2,740; Referee: (Portugal) Claúdio Pereira |

| 2 April 2022 28 | Arouca | 2–1 | Gil Vicente | Arouca |
| 18:00 WET (UTC±0) | Bukia (yellow card) 14'; Quaresma (yellow card) 34'; David Simão (red card) 45'; André Silva 55' 59' | Report | Lucas Cunha (yellow card) 82' (goal) 90+2'; Aouacheria (yellow card) 84'; Aburjania (yellow card) 89' (yellow-red card) 90' | Stadium: Estádio Municipal de Arouca; Attendance: 790; Referee: (Portugal) Fábio Veríssimo |

| 8 April 2022 29 | Gil Vicente | 1–2 | Moreirense | Barcelos |
| 20:15 WET (UTC±0) | Samuel Lino 89'; Lucas Cunha (yellow card) 90+2' | Report | Fábio Pacheco (red card) 47'; Jefferson Jr. 61' (yellow card) 74' (goal) 75'; Yan (yellow card) 76'; Mateus Pasinato (yellow card) 81'; Derik Lacerda (yellow card) 90+2' | Stadium: Estádio Cidade de Barcelos; Attendance: 2,839; Referee: (Portugal) Nuno Almeida |

| 15 April 2022 30 | Famalicão | 2–2 | Gil Vicente | Vila Nova de Famalicão |
| 18:00 WET (UTC±0) | Banza 18'; Gustavo Assunção (yellow card) 31'; Pêpê Rodrigues 37' (pen.) (yellow card) 38'; Cádiz (yellow card) 53'; Diogo Figueiras (yellow card) 75'; De La Fuente (yellow card) 87'; Pickel (yellow card) 90+5' | Report | Élder Santana 20'; Rúben Fernandes (yellow card) 45'; Vitor Carvalho (yellow card) 67'; Fujimoto (yellow card) 69'; Samuel Lino (yellow card) 75'; Fran Navarro 89' (pen.) | Stadium: Estádio Municipal 22 de Junho; Attendance: 4,563; Referee: (Portugal) André Narciso |

| 23 April 2022 31 | Gil Vicente | 1–1 | Paços de Ferreira | Barcelos |
| 20:30 WET (UTC±0) | Lucas Cunha (yellow card) 48'; Fran Navarro 73'; Rúben Fernandes (yellow card) 82' | Report | Matchoi Djaló (yellow card) 31'; Antunes 52' (pen.); Marco Baixinho (yellow card) 69'; Adrián Butzke (yellow card) 71'; Hélder Ferreira (yellow card) 87'; Diaby (yellow card) 90' | Stadium: Estádio Cidade de Barcelos; Attendance: 3,355; Referee: (Portugal) Rui Costa |

| 1 May 2022 32 | Sporting CP | 4–1 | Gil Vicente | Lisbon |
| 20:30 WEST (UTC+1) | Sarabia 21' (pen.); Edwards 38'; Cunha 53' (o.g.); Gonçalves 63' (pen.) | Report | Navarro 45+4' | Stadium: Estádio José Alvalade; Attendance: 25,425; Referee: Miguel Nogueira |

| 8 May 2022 33 | Gil Vicente | 3–0 | Tondela | Barcelos |
| 15:30 WET (UTC±0) | Fujimoto 56' (yellow card) 65'; Samuel Lino 63' 76' | Report | Marcelo Alves (red card) 39'; Rafael Barbosa (yellow card) 66'; Iker Undabarrena (yellow card) 90' | Stadium: Estádio Cidade de Barcelos; Attendance: 10,185; Referee: (Portugal) Hugo Miguel |

| 15 May 2022 34 | Vitória de Guimarães | 5–0 | Gil Vicente | Guimarães |
| 20:30 WET (UTC±0) | Estupiñán 20'; Tiago Silva (yellow card) 47'; Rúben Lameiras 51'; Janvier 83'; Ricardo Quaresma 84'; Bruno Duarte 90' | Report | | Stadium: Estádio D. Afonso Henriques; Attendance: 0 Referee: (Portugal) André Narciso |

=== Taça de Portugal ===
| 17 October 2021 Third round | Condeixa | 0–5 | Gil Vicente | Condeixa-a-Nova |
| 15:00 WEST (UTC+1) | | Report | Hanne 12', 37'; Diogo Silva 49'; Lino 75', 90' | Stadium: Estádio Municipal de Condeixa-a-Nova; Referee: Fábio Melo |

| 20 November 2021 Fourth round | Leça | 1–0 | Gil Vicente | Leça da Palmeira |
| 11:00 WET (UTC±0) | Rosado 65' | Report | | Stadium: Estádio do Leça FC; Referee: Claudio Pereira |

=== Taça da Liga ===
| 24 July 2021 First round | Tondela | 0–1 | Gil Vicente | Tondela |
| 11:00 WEST (UTC+1) | | Report | Vitor 87' | Stadium: Estádio João Cardoso; Attendance: 0 Referee: Miguel Nogueira |

| 30 July 2021 Second round | Paços de Ferreira | 1–1 (4–3 p) | Gil Vicente | Paços de Ferreira |
| 20:15 WEST (UTC+1) | Denílson 47' | Report | Bilel Aouacheria 58' | Stadium: Estádio Capital do Móvel; Attendance: 0 Referee: Rui Costa |
| | Penalties |
| | Douglas Tanque (penalty scored); Uilton (penalty scored); João Pedro (penalty missed); Juan Delgado (penalty scored); Maracás (penalty scored) | | (penalty scored) Talocha; (penalty missed) Paulinho Mota; (penalty missed) Pedrinho; (penalty scored) Rúben Fernandes; (penalty scored) Kanya Fujimoto |
