= 2022–23 Gil Vicente F.C. season =

Gil Vicente F.C.
2022–23 season
- Chairman: Francisco Dias da Silva
- Manager: Ivo Vieira (until 2 November); Daniel Sousa (from 14 November)
- Stadium: Estádio Cidade de Barcelos
- Primeira Liga: 16th
- Taça de Portugal: Fourth round
- Taça da Liga: Group stage
- UEFA Europa Conference League: Play-off round

The 2022–23 season is the 99th season in the history of Gil Vicente F.C. and their fourth consecutive season in the top flight. The club participate in the Primeira Liga, the Taça de Portugal, the Taça da Liga, and the UEFA Europa Conference League, where they were eliminated in the play-off round.

== Players ==
As of 28 July 2022

Note: Flags indicate national team as defined under FIFA eligibility rules; some limited exceptions apply. Players may hold more than one non-FIFA nationality.

No.	Pos.	Nation	Player
1	GK	RUS	Stanislav Kritsyuk
3	DF	BRA	Lucas Cunha
4	DF	POR	Né Lopes
5	DF	TOG	Emmanuel Hackman
6	MF	BRA	João Afonso
7	MF	FRA	Bilel Aouacheria
8	MF	GEO	Giorgi Aburjania
9	FW	ESP	Fran Navarro
10	MF	JPN	Kanya Fujimoto
11	MF	BRA	Marlon
12	GK	POR	Brian Araújo
15	MF	POR	Carraça (on loan from Porto)
17	FW	ESP	Kevin (on loan from Málaga)
18	MF	JPN	Mizuki Arai (on loan from Tokyo Verdy)
19	DF	ESP	Adrián Marín

No.	Pos.	Nation	Player
20	FW	URU	Juan Manuel Boselli
21	MF	BRA	Vitor Carvalho
25	MF	POR	Tiba
26	DF	POR	Rúben Fernandes
30	FW	IRI	Ali Alipour
42	GK	BRA	Andrew
44	FW	GHA	Eric Ayiah
55	DF	POR	Henrique Gomes
57	MF	BRA	Matheus Bueno
72	DF	POR	Tomás Araújo (on loan from Benfica)
77	FW	BRA	Murilo
78	DF	POR	Danilo Veiga
93	FW	BRA	Élder Santana
—	DF	BRA	Diogo Silva

=== Out on loan ===
Note: Flags indicate national team as defined under FIFA eligibility rules; some limited exceptions apply. Players may hold more than one non-FIFA nationality.

No.	Pos.	Nation	Player
—	MF	POR	João Caiado (at Länk until 30 June 2023)

== Pre-season and friendlies ==
Win Draw Loss Fixtures

13 July 2022 Friendly	Gil Vicente (Portugal)	2–0	(Portugal) Penafiel	Arcos de Valdevez
17:00 WEST (UTC+1)				Stadium: Estádio Municipal da Coutada

16 July 2022 Friendly	Gil Vicente (Portugal)	3–2	(Portugal) Leixões	TBD
--:-- WEST (UTC+1)

27 July 2022 Friendly	Vizela (Portugal)	2–3	(Portugal) Gil Vicente	Caldas de Vizela
09:00 WEST (UTC+1)				Stadium: Campo de Treinos do Futebol Clube de Vizela

23 September 2022 Friendly	Gil Vicente (Portugal)	8–0	(Portugal) Oliveirense	Barcelos
--:-- WEST (UTC+1)	Santana; Kevin; Navarro; Arai; Gomes; Boselli; Murilo

== Competitions ==
=== Overall record ===
Competition	First match	Last match	Starting round	Final position	Record							
Competition	First match	Last match	Starting round	Final position	Pld	W	D	L	GF	GA	GD	Win %
Primeira Liga	7 August 2022	May 2023	Matchday 1		13	2	3	8	11	21	−10	15.38
Taça de Portugal	15 October 2022	8 November 2022	Third round	Fourth round	2	1	0	1	4	4	+0	50.00
Taça da Liga	20 November 2022		Group stage		2	1	1	0	4	2	+2	50.00
UEFA Europa Conference League	3 August 2022	25 August 2022	Third qualifying round	Play-off round	4	1	1	2	6	7	−1	25.00
Total					21	5	5	11	25	34	−9	23.81

Last updated: 9 October 2022
Source: Soccerway

=== Primeira Liga ===
==== League table ====
Pos	Team	Pld	W	D	L	GF	GA	GD	Pts
11	Vizela	34	11	7	16	34	38	−4	40 (Note: Vizela finished ahead of Rio Ave on head-to-head points: Rio Ave 0–1 Vizela, Vizela 3–1 Rio Ave.)
12	Rio Ave	34	10	10	14	36	43	−7	40
13	Gil Vicente	34	10	7	17	32	41	−9	37
14	Estoril	34	10	5	19	33	49	−16	35
15	Portimonense	34	10	4	20	25	48	−23	34

Source: Liga Portugal
Rules for classification: 1) Points; 2) Head-to-head points; 3) Head-to-head goal difference; 4) Goal difference; 5) Matches won; 6) Goals scored; 7) Play-off.

==== Results summary ====
Overall								Home						Away					
Pld	W	D	L	GF	GA	GD	Pts	W	D	L	GF	GA	GD	W	D	L	GF	GA	GD
34	10	7	17	32	41	−9	37	6	6	5	15	14	+1	4	1	12	17	27	−10

Last updated: 27 May 2023.
Source: Liga Portugal

==== Results by round ====
Round	1	2	3	4	5	6	7	8	9	10	11	12	13	14	15	16	17	18	19	20	21	22	23	24	25	26	27	28	29	30	31	32	33	34
Ground	H	A	H	A	H	A	H	A	H	A	H	H	A	H	A	H	A	A	H	A	H	A	H	A	H	A	H	A	A	H	A	H	A	H
Result	W	L	D	D	L	W	D	L	L	L	L	L	L	W	L	W	W	L	D	W	D	W	W	L	D	L	D	L	L	L	L	W	L	W
Position	4	10	13	12	14	11	10	12	14	16	16	16	16	16	16	15	14	15	15	13	14	12	10	12	12	12	13	13	14	14	14	13	13	13

Updated to match(es) played on 27 May 2023. Source: Liga Portugal
A = Away; H = Home; W = Win; D = Draw; L = Loss

==== Matches ====
The league fixtures were announced on 5 July 2022.

7 August 2022 1	Gil Vicente	1–0	Paços de Ferreira	Barcelos
20:15 WEST (UTC+1)	Alipour 85'	Report		Stadium: Estádio Cidade de Barcelos; Referee: André Narciso

15 August 2022 2	Arouca	1–0	Gil Vicente	Arouca
18:00 WEST (UTC+1)	Rafa Mújica 2'; Soro (yellow card) 44'; Ruiz (yellow card) 52'; de Arruabarrena (yellow card) 73'; Vitinho (yellow card) 90+1'	Report	Lucas Cunha (yellow card) 39'; Carraça (yellow card) 82'	Stadium: Estádio Municipal de Arouca; Attendance: 1,759; Referee: (Portugal) Nuno Almeida

22 August 2022 3	Gil Vicente	0–0	Famalicão	Barcelos
20:15 WEST (UTC+1)	Boselli (yellow card) 48'	Report	Ivo Rodrigues (yellow card) 29'; Colombatto (yellow card) 67'; Luiz Júnior (yellow card) 72'; Théo Fonseca (yellow card) 90+4'; de la Fuente (yellow card) 90+7'	Stadium: Estádio Cidade de Barcelos; Attendance: 4,245; Referee: (Portugal) Cláudio Pereira

29 August 2022 4	Vizela	2–2	Gil Vicente	Vizela
21:15 WEST (UTC+1)	Raphael Guzzo (yellow card) 7'; Kiki Afonso (yellow card) 28'; Kiko Bondoso 45'; Anderson 45+5'	Report	Fran Navarro 8' (pen.); Boselli 26' (yellow card) 70'; Pedro Tiba (yellow card) 39'; Lucas Cunha (yellow card) 45+2'; Aburjania (yellow card) 66'; Adrián Marín (yellow card) 90+1'	Stadium: Estádio do FC Vizela; Attendance: 2,824; Referee: (Portugal) Manuel Oliveira

3 September 2022 5	Gil Vicente	0–2	Porto	Barcelos
20:30 WEST (UTC+1)	Vitor Carvalho (yellow card) 71'	Report	Taremi 41'; Galeno 44'	Stadium: Estádio Cidade de Barcelos; Attendance: 8,458; Referee: (Portugal) João Pinheiro

11 September 2022 6	Marítimo	1–2	Gil Vicente	Funchal
18:00 WEST (UTC+1)	Léo Andrade 27'; Cláudio Winck (yellow card) 73'; Vítor Costa (yellow card) 75'	Report	Fran Navarro 48' 85'	Stadium: Estádio do Marítimo; Attendance: 5,032; Referee: (Portugal) Miguel Nogueira

=== UEFA Europa Conference League ===
==== Third qualifying round ====
The draw for the third qualifying round was held on 18 July 2022.

3 August 2022 First leg	Riga (Latvia)	1–1	(Portugal) Gil Vicente	Riga, Latvia
20:00 EEST (UTC+3)	Aurélio 18'	Report	Boselli 63'	Stadium: Skonto Stadium; Attendance: 7,100; Referee: Jakob Kehlet (Denmark)

11 August 2022 Second leg	Gil Vicente (Portugal)	4–0 (5–1 agg.)	(Latvia) Riga	Barcelos, Portugal
20:00 WEST (UTC+1)	Ngonda 16' (o.g.); Villodres 22'; Navarro 45+1', 76' (pen.)	Report		Stadium: Estádio Cidade de Barcelos; Attendance: 7,596; Referee: Mykola Balakin (Ukraine)

==== Play-off round ====
The draw for the play-off round was held on 2 August 2022.

18 August 2022 First leg	AZ (Netherlands)	4–0	(Portugal) Gil Vicente	Alkmaar, Netherlands
21:00 CEST (UTC+2)	De Wit 24', 89'; Lahdo 78'; Pavlidis 85'	Report		Stadium: AFAS Stadion; Attendance: 11,211; Referee: Guillermo Cuadra Fernández (Spain)

25 August 2022 Second leg	Gil Vicente (Portugal)	1–2 (1–6 agg.)	(Netherlands) AZ	Barcelos, Portugal
20:00 WEST (UTC+1)	Boselli 86'	Report	Evjen 60'; Reijnders 64'	Stadium: Estádio Cidade de Barcelos; Attendance: 4,625; Referee: Fran Jovic (Croatia)
