= 2023–24 Gil Vicente F.C. season =

Gil Vicente F.C.
2023–24 season
- Manager: Vítor Campelos
- Stadium: Estádio de São Luís
- Primeira Liga: 14th
- Taça de Portugal: Fifth round
- Taça da Liga: First round

The 2023–24 season is Gil Vicente F.C.'s 100th season in existence and fifth consecutive in the Primeira Liga. They are also competing in the Taça de Portugal and Taça da Liga.

== Players ==
=== First-team squad ===
As of 26 September 2023

Note: Flags indicate national team as defined under FIFA eligibility rules; some limited exceptions apply. Players may hold more than one non-FIFA nationality.

No.	Pos.	Nation	Player
1	GK	BRA	Vinícius Dias
2	DF	POR	Zé Carlos
4	DF	POR	Né Lopes
5	DF	POR	Kiko Pereira
6	MF	PER	Jesús Castillo
7	FW	FRA	Tidjany Touré (on loan from Feyenoord)
8	MF	SUI	Maxime Dominguez
9	FW	IRI	Ali Alipour
10	MF	JPN	Kanya Fujimoto
11	FW	BRA	Marlon
12	GK	POR	Brian Araújo
13	DF	BRA	Gabriel Pereira
14	MF	CRC	Roan Wilson
16	MF	POR	André Simões

No.	Pos.	Nation	Player
21	FW	CRO	Roko Baturina
23	DF	POR	Leonardo Buta (on loan from Udinese)
24	MF	CIV	Mory Gbane (on loan from Khimki)
25	MF	POR	Pedro Tiba
26	DF	POR	Rúben Fernandes (captain)
27	FW	POR	Miguel Monteiro
29	FW	ANG	Depú
35	DF	BRA	Lipe
42	GK	BRA	Andrew
58	DF	BRA	Thomas Luciano
70	FW	POR	Félix Correia (on loan from Juventus)
76	MF	POR	Martim Neto (on loan from Benfica)
77	FW	BRA	Murilo Costa

=== Other players under contract ===
Note: Flags indicate national team as defined under FIFA eligibility rules; some limited exceptions apply. Players may hold more than one non-FIFA nationality.

No.	Pos.	Nation	Player
—	GK	RUS	Stanislav Kritsyuk

=== Out on loan ===
Note: Flags indicate national team as defined under FIFA eligibility rules; some limited exceptions apply. Players may hold more than one non-FIFA nationality.

No.	Pos.	Nation	Player
99	FW	POR	André Liberal (at Vila Real until 30 June 2024)
—	DF	BRA	Lucas Barros (at Tondela until 30 June 2024)

== Transfers ==
=== In ===
Pos.	Player	Transferred from	Fee	Date	Source
DF	(Portugal) Leonardo Buta	(Italy) Udinese	Loan	18 July 2023	
MF	(Portugal) Martim Neto	(Portugal) Benfica	Loan	1 August 2023	

=== Out ===
Pos.	Player	Transferred to	Fee	Date	Source
FW	(Spain) Fran Navarro	(Portugal) Porto	€7,000,000	5 July 2023	

== Pre-season and friendlies ==
Win Draw Loss Fixtures

29 July 2023 Friendly	Paços de Ferreira (Portugal)	2–3	(Portugal) Gil Vicente

== Competitions ==
=== Overall record ===
Competition	First match	Last match	Starting round	Final position	Record							
Competition	First match	Last match	Starting round	Final position	Pld	W	D	L	GF	GA	GD	Win %
Primeira Liga	16 August 2023	19 May 2024	Matchday 1		13	3	3	7	25	26	−1	23.08
Taça de Portugal	22 October 2023		Third round		2	2	0	0	3	1	+2	100.00
Taça da Liga	22 July 2023		First round	First round	1	0	0	1	0	1	−1	0.00
Total					16	5	3	8	28	28	+0	31.25

Last updated: 11 December 2023
Source: Soccerway

=== Primeira Liga ===
==== League table ====
Pos	Team	Pld	W	D	L	GF	GA	GD	Pts
10	Farense	34	10	7	17	46	51	−5	37 (Note: Head-to-head points: Farense 4, Rio Ave 1.)
11	Rio Ave	34	6	19	9	38	43	−5	37
12	Gil Vicente	34	9	9	16	42	52	−10	36
13	Estoril	34	9	6	19	49	58	−9	33 (Note: Head-to-head away goals scored: Estoril 1, Estrela da Amadora 0.)
14	Estrela da Amadora	34	7	12	15	33	53	−20	33

Source: Liga Portugal
Rules for classification: 1) Points; 2) Head-to-head points; 3) Head-to-head goal difference; 4) Head-to-head away goals scored; 5) Goal difference; 6) Matches won; 7) Goals scored; 8) Play-off.

==== Results summary ====
Overall								Home						Away					
Pld	W	D	L	GF	GA	GD	Pts	W	D	L	GF	GA	GD	W	D	L	GF	GA	GD
13	3	3	7	25	26	−1	12	3	3	1	19	11	+8	0	0	6	6	15	−9

Last updated: 11 December 2023.
Source: Superliga

==== Results by round ====
Round	1
Ground	
Result	
Position	

Updated to match(es) played on 11 December 2023. Source: Superliga
A = Away; H = Home; W = Win; D = Draw; L = Loss

==== Matches ====
The league fixtures were unveiled on 5 July 2023.

v	Gil Vicente

=== Taça de Portugal ===
v	Gil Vicente

=== Taça da Liga ===
v	Gil Vicente
