= Vitor Carvalho =

Brazilian footballer

Personal information
- Full name: Vitor Carvalho Vieira
- Date of birth: 27 May 1997 (age 29)
- Place of birth: Palmas, Brazil
- Height: 6 ft 0 in (1.83 m)
- Position: Midfielder

Team information
- Current team: Braga
- Number: 6

Youth career
- 2011–2016: Coritiba

Senior career*
Years	Team	Apps	(Gls)
2016–2020	Coritiba	65	(1)
2020	→ Gil Vicente (loan)	10	(2)
2020–2023	Gil Vicente	82	(3)
2023–	Braga	73	(3)
- * Club domestic league appearances and goals as of 19 October 2026

Vitor Carvalho Vieira (born 27 May 1997), known as Vitor Carvalho, is a Brazilian professional footballer who plays as a midfielder for Primeira Liga club Braga.

== Career ==
Vitor Carvalho came through the youth ranks at Coritiba. He made his senior debut for the club as a substitute on 11 December 2016, the last game of the 2016 Campeonato Brasileiro Série A against Ponte Preta, when Coritiba had already released a number of first team players.

== Career statistics ==
As of match played 19 October 2026

Appearances and goals by club, season and competition
Club	Season	League			National cup (Note: Includes Taça de Portugal)		League cup (Note: Includes Taça da Liga)		Continental		Total	
Club	Season	Division	Apps	Goals	Apps	Goals	Apps	Goals	Apps	Goals	Apps	Goals
Coritiba	2016	Série A	1	0	0	0	—		—		1	0
Coritiba	2017	Série A	1	0	0	0	—		—		1	0
Coritiba	2018	Série B	29	1	0	0	—		—		29	1
Coritiba	2019	Série B	13	0	0	0	—		—		13	0
Coritiba	Total		44	1	0	0	—		—		44	1
Gil Vicente (loan)	2019–20	Primeira Liga	10	2	0	0	0	0	—		10	2
Gil Vicente	2020–21	Primeira Liga	22	0	3	0	0	0	—		25	0
Gil Vicente	2021–22	Primeira Liga	29	0	1	0	2	1	—		32	1
Gil Vicente	2022–23	Primeira Liga	31	3	2	1	4	1	4 (Note: Appearances in UEFA Europa Conference League)	0	41	5
Gil Vicente	Total		82	3	6	1	6	2	4	0	98	6
Braga	2023–24	Primeira Liga	27	1	3	0	3	0	11 (Note: Nine appearances in UEFA Champions League, two appearances in UEFA Europa League)	0	44	1
Braga	2024–25	Primeira Liga	24	0	2	0	2	0	9 (Note: Appearances in UEFA Europa League)	2	37	2
Braga	2025–26	Primeira Liga	15	2	1	0	2	0	13	2	31	4
Braga	2026–27	Primeira Liga	7	0	0	0	0	0	6	0	13	0
Braga	Total		73	3	6	0	7	0	39	4	125	7
Career total			209	9	12	1	13	2	43	4	276	16

== Honours ==
Braga

- Taça da Liga: 2023–24
