= Diogo Silva (footballer, born 1995) =

Brazilian footballer

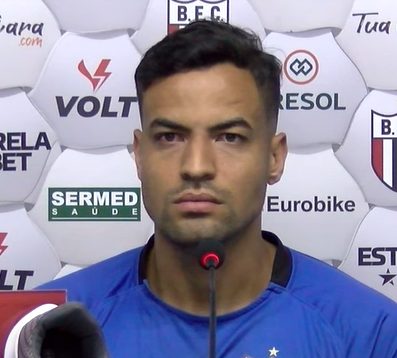
- Diogo Silva in 2023

Personal information
- Full name: Diogo da Costa Silva
- Date of birth: 11 January 1995 (age 31)
- Place of birth: São Paulo, Brazil
- Height: 1.86 m (6 ft 1 in)
- Position: Centre back

Youth career
- 2011−2013: Diadema
- 2014−2015: Corinthians
- 2014−2015: → Flamengo-SP (loan)

Senior career*
Years	Team	Apps	(Gls)
2013	Diadema	18	(3)
2016	Diadema	15	(3)
2017	Maringá	1	(0)
2019	Velo Clube	17	(2)
2019	Londrina	4	(0)
2020	Ypiranga-RS	14	(0)
2020−2022	Gil Vicente	6	(0)
2023	Botafogo-SP	37	(2)
2024	Portuguesa	3	(0)
2024	Amazonas	14	(0)
2024	Tianjin Jinmen Tiger	10	(0)
2025	Noroeste		
2025	Guarani	4	(0)
- * Club domestic league appearances and goals as of 15:53, 5 March 2024 (UTC)

Diogo da Costa Silva (born 11 January 1995), known as Diogo Silva, is a Brazilian professional footballer who plays as a central defender.

== Career ==
Diogo Silva was born in São Paulo, and was a Clube Atlético Diadema youth graduate. After making his first team debut with the side in the 2013 Campeonato Paulista Segunda Divisão, he returned to the youth setup with Corinthians, but was loaned to affiliate club Flamengo-SP during his entire spell.

In 2016, Diogo Silva returned to Diadema, and again featured regularly. He moved to Maringá ahead of the 2017 season, featuring rarely during the Campeonato Paranaense Série Prata but becoming a first-choice in the Taça FPF.

In November 2018, after spending the entire year without a club, Diogo Silva signed for Velo Clube. A regular starter in the 2019 Campeonato Paulista Série A3, he moved to Série B side Londrina on 7 May 2019.

Diogo Silva made his professional debut with LEC on 31 July 2019, starting in a 3–0 home win over Paraná. On 13 November, after appearing in just three more matches, he signed for Ypiranga-RS for the upcoming season.

On 21 September 2020, Diogo Silva moved abroad for the first time in his career, after agreeing to a three-year contract with Primeira Liga side Gil Vicente. After struggling with injuries in his first months, he made his debut on 20 February 2021, coming on as a late substitute for Claude Gonçalves in a 1–0 home win over Santa Clara.

Mainly a backup option to Lucas Cunha and Rúben Fernandes, Diogo Silva left Gil Vicente in July 2022. On 18 November, he was announced at Botafogo-SP in his home country's second division.

On 26 December 2023, Diogo Silva was announced at Portuguesa.

== Career statistics ==
As of match played 9 August 2025

Appearances and goals by club, season and competition
Club	Season	League			State League		Cup		Continental		Other		Total	
Club	Season	Division	Apps	Goals	Apps	Goals	Apps	Goals	Apps	Goals	Apps	Goals	Apps	Goals
Diadema	2013	Paulista 2ª Divisão	—		18	3	—		—		—		18	3
Diadema	2016	Paulista 2ª Divisão	—		15	3	—		—		—		15	3
Maringá	2017	Paranaense Série Prata	—		1	0	—		—		14 (Note: Appearance(s) in Taça FPF)	1	15	1
Velo Clube	2019	Paulista A3	—		17	2	—		—		—		17	2
Londrina	2019	Série B	4	0	—		—		—		—		4	0
Ypiranga-RS	2020	Série C	6	0	8	0	—		—		—		14	0
Gil Vicente	2020–21	Primeira Liga	3	0	—		0	0	—		0	0	3	0
Gil Vicente	2021–22	Primeira Liga	3	0	—		1	1	—		0	0	4	1
Gil Vicente	Total		6	0	—		1	1	—		0	0	7	1
Botafogo-SP	2023	Série B	25	2	12	0	3	1	—		—		40	3
Portuguesa	2024	Paulista	—		3	0	—		—		—		3	0
Amazonas	2024	Série B	14	0	—		2	0	—		—		16	0
Tianjin Jinmen Tiger	2024	Chinese Super League	10	0	—		1	0	—		—		11	0
Noroeste	2025	Paulista	—		0	0	—		—		—		0	0
Guarani	2025	Série C	4	0	—		—		—		—		4	0
Career total			69	2	74	8	7	2	0	0	14	1	164	13

== Honours ==
Maringá

- Campeonato Paranaense Série Prata: 2017
- Taça FPF: 2017
