= Kanya Fujimoto =

Japanese footballer (born 1999)

Kanya Fujimoto 藤本 寛也
Personal information
- Full name: Kanya Fujimoto
- Date of birth: 1 July 1999 (age 27)
- Place of birth: Yamanashi, Japan
- Height: 1.76 m (5 ft 9 in)
- Position: Midfielder

Team information
- Current team: Tokyo Verdy (on loan from Birmingham City)
- Number: 19

Youth career
- Amigos FC
- FC Valie Tsuru
- 2012–2017: Tokyo Verdy

Senior career*
Years	Team	Apps	(Gls)
2018–2022	Tokyo Verdy	49	(4)
2020–2022	→ Gil Vicente (loan)	59	(4)
2022–2025	Gil Vicente	97	(8)
2025–	Birmingham City	4	(0)
2026–	→ Tokyo Verdy (loan)	0	(0)

International career
2018	Japan U19	3	(0)
2019	Japan U20	3	(0)
Medal record
Representing Japan
AFC U-19 Championship
Bronze medal – third place	2018
- * Club domestic league appearances and goals as of 1 October 2025

Kanya Fujimoto (藤本 寛也, Fujimoto Kanya; born 1 July 1999) is a Japanese footballer who plays as a central midfielder or attacking midfielder for J1 League club Tokyo Verdy, on loan from EFL Championship club Birmingham City.

== Early life ==
Kanya was born in Yamanashi Prefecture.

== Career ==
=== Tokyo Verdy ===
After being raised on Tokyo Verdy youth ranks, Fujimoto was promoted to the top team in October 2017. He debuted in a J2 League game in the opening match of the 2018 season against JEF United Chiba. He scored his first goal for the club against Fagiano Okayama on 27 June 2018, scoring in the 20th minute.

=== Gil Vicente ===
In May 2020, Portuguese newspaper A Bola reported advanced talks for a move to Gil Vicente for the 2020-21 season, in a one-year loan with an option to buy his contract. The move was confirmed on 5 August 2020, as he signed for the Portuguese club on loan with an option for them to buy out his contract. He made his debut for Gil against Santa Clara on 3 October 2020. He scored his first goal for the club against Sporting CP on 9 February 2021, scoring in the 36th minute.

=== Birmingham City ===
On 6 July 2025, Fujimoto joined Championship club Birmingham City on a three-year deal. On 26 August 2025, he made his debut for the Blues, being substituted off at half-time in a 1–0 EFL Cup defeat to Port Vale.

== Career statistics ==
As of match played 30 September 2025

Appearances and goals by club, season and competition
Club	Season	League			National cup (Note: Includes Emperor's Cup, Taça de Portugal, FA Cup)		League cup (Note: Includes J.League Cup, Taça da Liga, EFL Cup)		Continental		Total	
Club	Season	Division	Apps	Goals	Apps	Goals	Apps	Goals	Apps	Goals	Apps	Goals
Tokyo Verdy	2018	J2 League	25	3	0	0	0	0	–		25	3
Tokyo Verdy	2019	J2 League	16	0	0	0	0	0	–		16	0
Tokyo Verdy	2020	J2 League	8	1	0	0	0	0	–		8	1
Tokyo Verdy	Total		49	4	0	0	0	0	–		49	4
Gil Vicente (loan)	2020–21	Primeira Liga	27	1	4	0	0	0	–		31	1
Gil Vicente (loan)	2021–22	Primeira Liga	32	3	1	0	2	0	–		35	3
Gil Vicente	2022–23	Primeira Liga	34	0	2	0	4	1	4 (Note: Appearances in UEFA Europa Conference League)	0	44	1
Gil Vicente	2023–24	Primeira Liga	33	3	4	2	1	0	–		38	5
Gil Vicente	2024–25	Primeira Liga	30	5	3	0	0	0	–		33	5
Gil Vicente	Total		156	12	14	2	7	1	4	0	181	15
Birmingham City	2025–26	Championship	1	0	0	0	1	0	—		2	0
Career total			206	16	14	2	8	1	4	0	232	19

== Honours ==
Individual

- Primeira Liga Midfielder of the Month: September/October 2024,
