= Brian Araújo =

Portuguese footballer (born 2000)

Personal information
- Full name: Brian da Rocha Araújo
- Date of birth: 29 April 2000 (age 26)
- Place of birth: Paris, France
- Height: 1.88 m (6 ft 2 in)
- Position: Goalkeeper

Team information
- Current team: Lusitânia
- Number: 29

Youth career
- 2007–2011: Asnières
- 2011–2013: Braga
- 2013–2019: Gil Vicente

Senior career*
Years	Team	Apps	(Gls)
2019–2025	Gil Vicente	3	(0)
2025–2026	Farense	30	(0)
2026–	Lusitânia	1	(0)

International career
2016	Portugal U16	1	(0)
- * Club domestic league appearances and goals as of 17:52, 21 September 2026 (UTC)

Brian da Rocha Araújo (born 29 April 2000) is a professional footballer who plays as a goalkeeper for Liga Portugal 2 club Lusitânia.

Born in France, he represented Portugal at youth level.

== Club career ==
Born in Paris of Portuguese descent, Araújo joined the academy of Gil Vicente F.C. at the age of 13. He made his Primeira Liga debut with the club on 4 January 2021, in a 0–0 home draw against B-SAD.

Following Stanislav Kritsyuk's transfer to FC Zenit Saint Petersburg in September 2021, Araújo acted as backup to Žiga Frelih first and Andrew later. He left the Estádio Cidade de Barcelos on 19 May 2025, ending a 12-year relationship.

On 21 August 2025, Araújo signed a two-year contract with Liga Portugal 2 club S.C. Farense. At the end of only one, however, he joined Lusitânia F.C. in the same tier.

== International career ==
Araújo represented Portugal at under-16 level. He was also picked for the under-17 side, but did not appear in any matches.
