= Rúben Fernandes =

Portuguese footballer

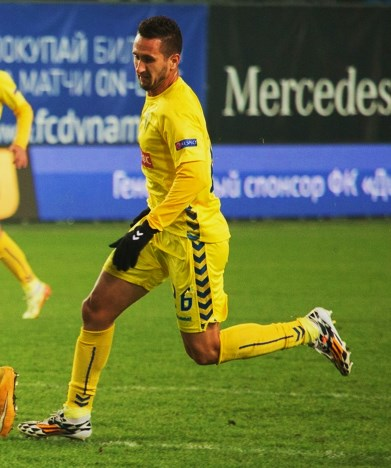
- Fernandes with Estoril in 2014

Personal information
- Full name: Rúben Miguel Marques dos Santos Fernandes
- Date of birth: 6 May 1986 (age 40)
- Place of birth: Portimão, Portugal
- Height: 1.86 m (6 ft 1 in)
- Position: Centre-back

Team information
- Current team: Varzim

Youth career
- 1997–2004: Portimonense

Senior career*
Years	Team	Apps	(Gls)
2004–2008	Portimonense	53	(4)
2007–2008	→ Varzim (loan)	10	(0)
2008–2009	Varzim	13	(1)
2009–2013	Portimonense	114	(12)
2013–2015	Estoril	55	(5)
2015–2017	Sint-Truiden	64	(6)
2017–2019	Portimonense	66	(4)
2019–2025	Gil Vicente	179	(5)
2025–2026	Farense	27	(0)
2026–	Varzim		

International career
2006	Portugal U20	3	(0)
2006	Portugal B	1	(0)
- * Club domestic league appearances and goals as of 05:57, 22 June 2026 (UTC)

Rúben Miguel Marques dos Santos Fernandes (born 6 May 1986) is a Portuguese professional footballer who plays as a central defender for Liga 3 club Varzim.

== Club career ==
Born in Portimão, Faro District, Fernandes started his career with local Portimonense SC. In the summer of 2007, he joined Varzim S.C. on loan as a replacement for Bruno Miguel, returning at the end of the season and renewing his contract for another year.

Fernandes made his debut in the Primeira Liga in the 2010–11 campaign, playing 20 games and scoring once as his team was relegated one year after being promoted. He only returned to the top division for 2013–14 after signing with G.D. Estoril Praia, taking part in two UEFA Europa League campaigns with the team and scoring a late equaliser as a substitute in a 1–1 group stage draw against eventual champions Sevilla FC, on 28 November 2013.

In late April 2015, as his contract with the Lisbon outskirts club was about to expire, Fernandes hinted in his Facebook page he was open to negotiations for its renewal. However, in June, he signed a two-year deal with the option for a third one with promoted Belgian Pro League side Sint-Truidense V.V. In September, he stated in an interview that the main reason for moving abroad was to experience another championship.

Fernandes scored his first goal for his new team on 24 July 2015, to help the hosts to defeat Club Brugge KV 2–1. His second came on 19 September, in a 3–0 away victory over K.V.C. Westerlo.

Fernandes then returned to his country's top tier, where he represented Portimonense and Gil Vicente FC. On 5 October 2024, he made his 300th appearance in the competition in a 3–0 defeat of C.F. Estrela da Amadora.

On 25 June 2025, the 39-year-old Fernandes went back to Liga Portugal 2 on a one-year contract at S.C. Farense.

== International career ==
Fernandes won three caps for the Portugal under-20 team, all in 2006. His first arrived on 5 October, in a 6–0 defeat of São Tomé and Príncipe in the Lusophony Games.

== Career statistics ==
As of match played 17 May 2026

Club	Season	League			National cup (Note: Includes Taça de Portugal, Belgian Cup)		League cup (Note: Includes Taça da Liga)		Continental		Total	
Club	Season	Division	Apps	Goals	Apps	Goals	Apps	Goals	Apps	Goals	Apps	Goals
Portimonense	2004–05	Segunda Liga	5	0	1	0	—		—		6	0
Portimonense	2005–06	Liga de Honra	28	2	2	0	—		—		30	2
Portimonense	2006–07	Liga de Honra	20	2	2	0	—		—		22	2
Portimonense	Total		53	4	5	0	—		—		58	4
Varzim	2007–08	Liga de Honra	10	0	0	0	0	0	—		10	0
Varzim	2008–09	Liga de Honra	13	1	1	0	0	0	—		14	1
Varzim	Total		23	1	1	0	0	0	—		24	1
Portimonense	2009–10	Liga de Honra	24	0	2	0	3	0	—		29	0
Portimonense	2010–11	Primeira Liga	20	1	1	0	2	0	—		23	1
Portimonense	2011–12	Liga de Honra	29	3	2	0	7	0	—		38	3
Portimonense	2012–13	Segunda Liga	41	8	2	1	3	2	—		46	11
Portimonense	Total		114	12	7	1	15	2	—		136	15
Estoril	2013–14	Primeira Liga	24	1	3	0	1	0	5 (Note: Appearances in UEFA Europa League)	1	33	2
Estoril	2014–15	Primeira Liga	31	4	0	0	1	0	3	0	35	4
Estoril	Total		55	5	3	0	2	0	8	1	68	6
Sint-Truiden	2015–16	Belgian Pro League	26	3	1	0	—		—		27	3
Sint-Truiden	2016–17	Belgian First Division A	38	3	2	0	—		—		40	3
Sint-Truiden	Total		64	6	3	0	—		—		67	6
Portimonense	2017–18	Primeira Liga	33	4	2	0	3	0	—		38	4
Portimonense	2018–19	Primeira Liga	33	0	1	0	1	0	—		35	0
Portimonense	Total		66	4	3	0	4	0	—		73	4
Gil Vicente	2019–20	Primeira Liga	31	1	2	0	2	0	—		35	1
Gil Vicente	2020–21	Primeira Liga	32	1	3	0	—		—		35	1
Gil Vicente	2021–22	Primeira Liga	33	1	0	0	2	0	—		35	1
Gil Vicente	2022–23	Primeira Liga	26	0	2	0	3	0	3 (Note: Appearances in UEFA Conference League)	0	34	0
Gil Vicente	2023–24	Primeira Liga	29	1	2	1	1	0	—		32	2
Gil Vicente	2024–25	Primeira Liga	28	1	4	0	—		—		32	1
Gil Vicente	Total		179	5	13	1	8	0	3	0	203	6
Farense	2025–26	Liga Portugal 2	27	0	2	0	—		—		29	0
Career total			581	37	37	2	29	2	11	1	658	42
