= Henrique Gomes (footballer, born 1995) =

Portuguese footballer

Personal information
- Full name: Henrique Martins Gomes
- Date of birth: 30 November 1995 (age 30)
- Place of birth: Barcelos, Portugal
- Height: 1.85 m (6 ft 1 in)
- Position: Left-back

Team information
- Current team: Olympiakos Nicosia
- Number: 55

Youth career
- 2005–2008: Gil Vicente
- 2008–2009: Braga
- 2009–2010: Marinhas
- 2010–2014: Gil Vicente

Senior career*
Years	Team	Apps	(Gls)
2014–2016	Gil Vicente	0	(0)
2014–2015	→ Santa Maria (loan)	19	(0)
2015–2016	→ Vilaverdense (loan)	16	(1)
2016–2018	Vilaverdense	43	(5)
2018–2019	Covilhã	28	(2)
2019–2023	Gil Vicente	46	(2)
2023–2025	Académico Viseu	37	(1)
2025–	Olympiakos Nicosia	35	(1)
- * Club domestic league appearances and goals as of 12:14, 20 October 2026 (UTC)

Henrique Martins Gomes (born 30 November 1995) is a Portuguese professional footballer who plays as a left-back for Cypriot First Division club Olympiakos Nicosia.

== Club career ==
Born in Barcelos, Braga District, Gomes had two youth spells at local club Gil Vicente FC, the second from ages 14 to 18. He made his senior debut on loan, spending one season apiece with Santa Maria F.C. and Vilaverdense F.C. in the third division; in June 2016, he signed a permanent contract with the latter side.

On 30 May 2018, Gomes joined S.C. Covilhã of the LigaPro. His first professional match took place on 21 July, in a 2–0 away loss against C.D. Mafra in the first round of the Taça da Liga. He made his league debut on 12 August in the 0–0 home draw with Académico de Viseu FC, and scored his first goal the following week to help the visitors win 4–2 at C.D. Cova da Piedade.

Gomes returned to Gil on 24 May 2019, agreeing to a two-year deal. He played his first game in the Primeira Liga on 29 September, starting and finishing the 1–0 away defeat to C.D. Santa Clara.

After 21 appearances (23 in all competitions) and one goal in his first year at the Estádio Cidade de Barcelos, Gomes subsequently acted as backup to Talocha. On 20 June 2021, he signed an extension until 2023, leaving upon its expiration.
