= Juan Manuel Boselli =

Uruguayan footballer (born 1999)

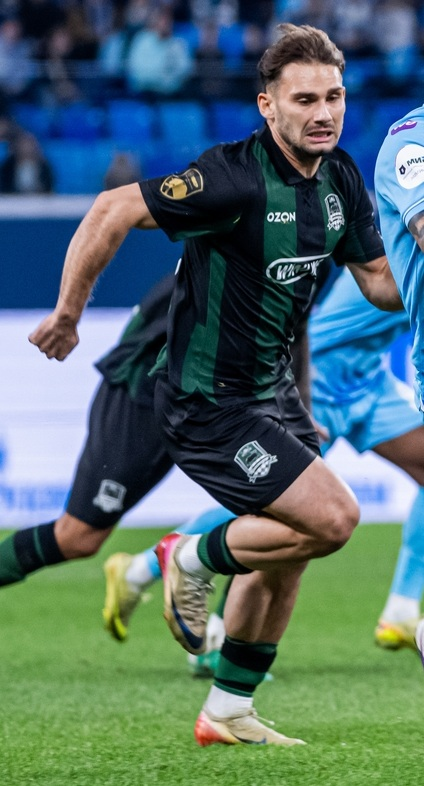
- Boselli with Krasnodar in 2026

Personal information
- Full name: Juan Manuel Boselli Graf
- Date of birth: 9 November 1999 (age 27)
- Place of birth: Montevideo, Uruguay
- Height: 1.73 m (5 ft 8 in)
- Position: Forward

Team information
- Current team: Krasnodar
- Number: 23

Youth career
- Defensor Sporting

Senior career*
Years	Team	Apps	(Gls)
2017–2022	Defensor Sporting	32	(2)
2019	→ Peralada (loan)	12	(2)
2019–2020	→ Athletico Paranaense (loan)	3	(0)
2019	→ América Mineiro (loan)	0	(0)
2020–2021	→ Cádiz B (loan)	23	(2)
2021–2022	→ Tondela (loan)	21	(5)
2022–2023	Gil Vicente	27	(1)
2023–2026	Pari Nizhny Novgorod	64	(20)
2026–	Krasnodar	23	(3)

International career
2017–2019	Uruguay U20	21	(3)
Medal record
Men's football
Representing Uruguay
South American Games
Silver medal – second place	2018 Cochabamba	Team
- * Club domestic league appearances and goals as of 31 October 2026

Juan Manuel Boselli Graf (born 9 November 1999) is a Uruguayan professional footballer who plays as a forward for Russian Premier League club Krasnodar.

== Club career ==
=== Defensor Sporting ===
Having previously represented Defensor Sporting at various youth levels, with whom he won the U17 Clausura title in 2016, Boselli received his first experience with the senior team on 2 February 2017 when he featured as an unused substitute in a 2–0 win over Rampla. He made his debut later that month, replacing goalscorer Gonzalo Bueno in the second half of a 2–1 victory against Juventud.

==== Loan to Peralada ====
In January 2019, he moved on loan to Peralada-Girona B, the reserve team of Girona FC.

==== Loan to Athletico Paranaense ====
On 13 August 2019, Club Athletico Paranaense confirmed that Boselli had joined the club on loan until December 2020. However, he left the club again less than a month later, even before making his debut. It was later revealed by the club's manager, Tiago Nunes, that Boselli "did not come to play in the first team" and that he "came to take the official photo with the black and red shirt but was immediately transferred to the U23 squad". He then began training with América Futebol Clube (MG) and even played a friendly game for the club, before joining the club on 5 September 2019 on loan for the rest of 2019 to guarantee more minutes on the court. However, he would return to Club Athletico Paranaense for the 2020 season, as the loan deal with the club was valid until December 2020. Boselli was registered for Paranaense's U-23 squad.

==== Loan to Cádiz B ====
In September 2020, Boselli began training with Cádiz CF B. The deal was announced on 5 October 2020, signing a loan-deal until 30 June 2022. The loan was terminated early after the 2021–22 season.

==== Loan to Tondela ====
On 30 August 2021, Boselli joined Tondela in the Portuguese Primeira Liga on loan until June 2023.

=== Gil Vicente ===
On 15 July 2022, Primeira Liga side Gil Vicente announced the signing of Boselli on a three-year contract.

=== Pari Nizhny Novgorod ===
On 10 September 2023, Boselli moved to Russian Premier League club Pari Nizhny Novgorod, signing a three-year contract. On 12 May 2025, he scored 4 goals in a 5–2 victory over Krylia Sovetov Samara.

=== Krasnodar ===
On 11 February 2026, Boselli joined the reigning Russian champions Krasnodar and signed a two-and-a-half-season contract.

== International career ==
=== Uruguay national youth teams ===
Boselli was called up to the Uruguay U20 side for the first time in March 2017, and made his debut as a substitute for Nicolás De La Cruz in a 1–0 friendly loss to Argentina. In May the same, he was named in Urruguay's squad for the 2017 FIFA U-20 World Cup in South Korea.

== Career statistics ==
As of match played 31 October 2026

Appearances and goals by club, season and competition
Club	Season	League			State league		National cup		League cup		Continental		Other		Total	
Club	Season	Division	Apps	Goals	Apps	Goals	Apps	Goals	Apps	Goals	Apps	Goals	Apps	Goals	Apps	Goals
Defensor Sporting	2017	Primera División	16	0	—		—		—		0	0	—		16	0
Defensor Sporting	2018	Primera División	16	2	—		—		—		5 (Note: Four appearances in Copa Libertadores, one appearance in Copa Sudamericana)	0	—		21	2
Defensor Sporting	Total		32	2	—		—		—		5	0	—		37	2
Peralada (loan)	2018–19	Segunda División B	12	2	—		—		—		—		—		12	2
América Mineiro (loan)	2019	Série B	0	0	0	0	0	0	—		—		—		0	0
Athletico Paranaense (loan)	2020	Série A	0	0	3 (Note: Appearance(s) in Campeonato Paranaense)	0	0	0	0	0	—		—		3	0
Cádiz B (loan)	2020–21	Segunda División B	23	2	—		—		—		—		—		23	2
Tondela (loan)	2021–22	Primeira Liga	21	5	—		6	3	0	0	—		—		27	8
Gil Vicente	2022–23	Primeira Liga	27	1	—		1	0	4	0	4 (Note: Appearance(s) in UEFA Europa Conference League)	2	—		36	3
Pari Nizhny Novgorod	2023–24	Russian Premier League	22	3	—		2	0	—		—		—		24	3
Pari Nizhny Novgorod	2024–25	Russian Premier League	26	10	—		3	0	—		—		2 (Note: Appearance in the relegation play-offs)	1	31	11
Pari Nizhny Novgorod	2025–26	Russian Premier League	16	7	—		4	3	—		—		—		20	10
Pari Nizhny Novgorod	Total		64	20	—		9	3	—		—		2	1	75	24
Krasnodar	2025–26	Russian Premier League	12	1	—		5	0	—		—		—		17	1
Krasnodar	2026–27	Russian Premier League	11	2	—		4	0	—		—		—		15	2
Krasnodar	Total		23	3	—		9	0	—		—		—		32	3
Career total			202	35	3	0	25	6	4	0	9	2	2	1	245	44

== Honours ==
Uruguay U20

- South American Games silver medal: 2018

== Personal life ==
Boselli also holds citizenship of Italy and is registered with the Russian Premier League as an Italian player.
