= Boubacar Hanne =

Portuguese footballer

Personal information
- Full name: Boubacar Rafael Neto Hanne
- Date of birth: 26 February 1999 (age 27)
- Place of birth: Paços de Ferreira, Portugal
- Height: 1.75 m (5 ft 9 in)
- Position: Winger

Team information
- Current team: Spartak Varna
- Number: 11

Youth career
- 2007–2017: Paços Ferreira
- 2017–2018: Wolverhampton Wanderers

Senior career*
Years	Team	Apps	(Gls)
2018–2020	Wolverhampton Wanderers	0	(0)
2018	→ Estudiantes Murcia (loan)	1	(0)
2018–2019	→ Jumilla (loan)	33	(5)
2020	→ Grasshoppers (loan)	0	(0)
2020–2023	Gil Vicente	21	(1)
2023	Argeș Pitești	7	(0)
2023–2024	Vilaverdense	30	(1)
2024–2025	Torreense	3	(0)
2025–2026	Mesaimeer	5	(0)
2026	Dobrudzha	8	(0)
2026–	Spartak Varna	13	(2)
- * Club domestic league appearances and goals as of 12:00, 10 November 2026 (UTC)

Boubacar Rafael Neto Hanne (born 26 February 1999) is a Portuguese professional footballer who plays as a left winger for Bulgarian First League club Spartak Varna.

== Early life ==
Hanne was born in Paços de Ferreira, Porto District, to Senegalese footballer Hanne Tanou and a Portuguese mother. He joined F.C. Paços de Ferreira's youth system at the age of 8.

== Club career ==
On 18 July 2017, Hanne and his compatriot Pedro Gonçalves signed two-year contracts with English club Wolverhampton Wanderers, being assigned to the under-23 team. He never appeared competitively for the main squad during his tenure, being loaned to FC Jumilla in the Spanish Segunda División B and Grasshopper Club Zürich in the Swiss Challenge League.

Hanne returned to his country on 7 August 2020, joining Gil Vicente F.C. on a three-year deal. He made his Primeira Liga debut on 27 September, coming on as a 75th-minute substitute for Antoine Leautey in a 1–0 home win against Portimonense SC. He scored his only goal in the competition 15 months later, closing the 3–0 away victory over C.D. Tondela.

On 11 January 2023, Hanne agreed to a one-and-a-half-year contract at Liga I club FC Argeș Pitești. He subsequently returned to his country, representing in quick succession Länk FC Vilaverdense and S.C.U. Torreense in the Liga Portugal 2.
