= Murilo Costa =

Brazilian footballer (born 1994)

Personal information
- Full name: Murilo de Souza Costa
- Date of birth: 31 October 1994 (age 32)
- Place of birth: São José do Norte, Brazil
- Height: 1.76 m (5 ft 9 in)
- Position: Winger

Team information
- Current team: Gil Vicente
- Number: 77

Youth career
- Caxias
- Internacional

Senior career*
Years	Team	Apps	(Gls)
2012	Caxias	1	(0)
2013	Internacional	6	(1)
2014–2016	Botafogo	13	(0)
2015	→ Macaé (loan)	3	(0)
2016	→ Lajeadense (loan)	12	(2)
2016	→ Joinville (loan)	13	(1)
2017	Juventude	7	(1)
2017–2018	Barra-RS	0	(0)
2017–2018	→ Nacional (loan)	38	(13)
2018–2021	Braga	20	(3)
2020	→ Sporting Gijón (loan)	16	(2)
2020–2021	→ Mallorca (loan)	14	(0)
2021–2024	Gil Vicente	73	(11)
2024–2025	Kyoto Sanga	18	(0)
2025–	Gil Vicente	42	(13)
- * Club domestic league appearances and goals as of 20:08, 11 November 2026 (UTC)

Murilo de Souza Costa (born 31 October 1994), sometimes known as just Murilo, is a Brazilian professional footballer who plays as a winger for Primeira Liga club Gil Vicente.

== Career ==
=== Internacional ===
Born in São José do Norte, Rio Grande do Sul, Murilo Costa played once as a substitute for Sociedade Esportiva e Recreativa Caxias do Sul in the 2012 Campeonato Gaúcho before joining Sport Club Internacional of the same league. He made six appearances as they won the 2014 title, and scored once in a 2–1 win at Esporte Clube Passo Fundo on 26 January.

In late September 2014, Murilo Costa signed a two-year contract with Campeonato Brasileiro Série A club Botafogo de Futebol e Regatas. The team were runners-up in the 2015 Campeonato Carioca, though his input was just two substitute appearances; that September he was loaned to Macaé Esporte Futebol Clube for the Série B season, playing just three games from the bench.

Murilo returned to his home state in January 2016, joining Clube Esportivo Lajeadense on loan for the Campeonato Gaúcho season. After their relegation, he headed to Joinville Esporte Clube for three months on 4 April. The team finished as runners-up in the Campeonato Catarinense, and he scored in a 1–1 draw at Esporte Clube Comercial (MS) in the first round of the Copa do Brasil on 21 April (2–1 aggregate win).

=== Juventude / Nacional ===
In December 2016, Murilo Costa left Internacional for Esporte Clube Juventude in the same state. He played seven games in the 2017 Gauchão season, scoring the only goal of a home win over Ypiranga Futebol Clube on 12 February.

On 9 June 2017, Murilo moved abroad for the first time, loaned to C.D. Nacional who had recently been relegated to Portugal's LigaPro. He was the Madeiran club's second top scorer behind Ricardo Gomes – fifth overall – with 13 goals as they won promotion as champions; this included braces with a late equaliser in a 3–3 draw at Académico de Viseu F.C. on 18 February and in a 6–0 home win over FC Porto B on 7 March.

=== Braga ===
On 1 July 2018, shortly after Nacional's promotion, Murilo Costa signed a five-year deal with fellow Primeira Liga club S.C. Braga. He scored his first goal for them the following 18 January in a 3–0 win on his return to the Estádio da Madeira, having previously played seven minutes in the league all season.

==== Sporting Gijón (loan) ====
On 31 January 2020, Murilo Costa was loaned to Spanish club Sporting de Gijón until the end of the season.

==== Mallorca (loan) ====
On 17 September 2020, Murilo Costa joined fellow second division side RCD Mallorca on loan for the 2020–21 season.

=== Kyoto Sanga ===
On 8 August 2024, Murilo signed with Kyoto Sanga in Japan. Less than one year after the signing, Murilo and Kyoto Sanga reach an agreement for rescind the contract on 30 July 2025.

== Career statistics ==
=== Club ===
As of match played 8 November 2026

Appearances and goals by club, season and competition
Club	Season	League			State league (Note: Includes Campeonato Gaúcho, Campeonato Carioca, Campeonato Catarinense)		National cup (Note: Includes Copa do Brasil, Taça de Portugal, Emperor's Cup)		League cup (Note: Includes Taça da Liga, J.League Cup)		Continental		Total	
Club	Season	Division	Apps	Goals	Apps	Goals	Apps	Goals	Apps	Goals	Apps	Goals	Apps	Goals
Caxias	2012	Série C	—		1	0	—		—		—		1	0
Internacional	2014	Série A	—		6	1	—		—		—		6	1
Botafogo	2014	Série A	11	0	0	0	1	0	—		—		12	0
Botafogo	2015	Série B	—		2	0	0	0	—		—		2	0
Botafogo	Total		11	0	2	0	1	0	0	0	0	0	14	0
Macaé (loan)	2015	Série B	3	0	—		—		—		—		3	0
Lajeadense (loan)	2016	Gaúcho A1	—		12	2	—		—		—		12	2
Joinville (loan)	2016	Série B	11	1	2	0	1	1	—		—		14	2
Juventude	2017	Série B	0	0	7	1	0	0	—		—		7	1
Nacional (loan)	2017–18	LigaPro	38	13	—		1	0	0	0	—		39	13
Braga	2018–19	Primeira Liga	13	3	—		4	0	2	0	—		19	3
Braga	2019–20	Primeira Liga	7	0	—		0	0	2	0	4 (Note: Appearance in UEFA Europa League)	0	13	0
Braga	Total		20	3	0	0	4	0	4	0	4	0	32	3
Sporting Gijón (loan)	2019–20	Segunda División	16	2	—		0	0	—		—		16	2
Mallorca (loan)	2020–21	Segunda División	14	0	—		2	0	—		—		16	0
Gil Vicente	2021–22	Primeira Liga	14	2	—		1	0	2	0	—		17	2
Gil Vicente	2022–23	Primeira Liga	28	5	—		1	0	3	0	—		32	5
Gil Vicente	2023–24	Primeira Liga	31	4	—		4	1	0	0	—		35	5
Gil Vicente	Total		73	11	—		6	1	5	0	—		84	12
Kyoto Sanga	2024	J1 League	7	0	—		2	0	0	0	—		9	0
Kyoto Sanga	2025	J1 League	11	0	—		2	0	3	1	—		16	1
Kyoto Sanga	Total		18	0	—		4	0	3	1	—		25	1
Gil Vicente	2025–26	Primeira Liga	32	11	—		1	0	0	0	—		33	11
Gil Vicente	2026–27	Primeira Liga	10	2	—		1	0	1	0	—		12	2
Gil Vicente	Total		42	13	—		2	0	1	0	—		45	13
Career total			246	43	30	4	21	2	13	1	4	0	314	50

== Honorus ==
Internacional

- Campeonato Gaúcho: 2014

Nacional

- LigaPro: 2017–18

Braga

- Taça da Liga: 2019–20
