= Kevin Medina (Spanish footballer) =

Spanish association football player

Personal information
- Full name: Kevin Villodres Medina
- Date of birth: 26 February 2001 (age 25)
- Place of birth: Málaga, Spain
- Height: 1.73 m (5 ft 8 in)
- Position: Winger

Team information
- Current team: Córdoba
- Number: 11

Youth career
- 2014–2016: Málaga
- 2016–2017: 26 de Febrero
- 2017–2018: Sevilla
- 2018: 26 de Febrero
- 2018–2020: Málaga

Senior career*
Years	Team	Apps	(Gls)
2019–2021	Málaga B	20	(5)
2021–2025	Málaga	89	(5)
2022–2023	→ Gil Vicente (loan)	21	(0)
2025–	Córdoba	29	(2)
- * Club domestic league appearances and goals as of 6 June 2026

Kevin Villodres Medina (born 26 February 2001), sometimes known as just Kevin, is a Spanish footballer who plays as a left winger for Córdoba.

== Club career ==
Born in Málaga, Andalusia, Kevin represented Málaga, 26 de Febrero and Sevilla as a youth. He made his senior debut with the reserves on 10 November 2019, coming on as a late substitute for Alberto Quintana in a 1–2 Tercera División away loss against Huétor Vega.

Kevin scored his first senior goal on 29 November 2020, netting the B's third in a 3–0 home win over Motril. He scored a brace in a 5–0 home routing of Melilla, and renewed his contract until 2023 on 4 March 2021.

Kevin made his first team debut on 16 August 2021, starting in a 0–0 home draw against Mirandés in the Segunda División. On 23 July 2022, he was loaned to Primeira Liga side Gil Vicente for the season.

Returning to Málaga in 2023, Kevin was a regular starter during the 2023–24 Primera Federación, as the club achieved promotion to the second division. On 4 June 2025, he left upon the expiration of his contract.

On 3 July 2025, Kevin signed a two-year deal with Córdoba, also at the second level.
