= Simão Júnior =

Bissau-Guinean footballer (born 1998)

Personal information
- Full name: Aurísio Saliu Fernandes Embalo Júnior
- Date of birth: 29 August 1998 (age 28)
- Place of birth: Cacém, Sintra, Portugal
- Height: 1.92 m (6 ft 4 in)
- Position: Centre-back

Team information
- Current team: FK Banga
- Number: 6

Youth career
- 2014–2015: Cacém
- 2015–2016: Linda-a-Velha
- 2016–2017: Chaves

Senior career*
Years	Team	Apps	(Gls)
2017–2018	Chaves B		
2018–2019	Moura	25	(1)
2019–2021	Cova da Piedade	23	(0)
2021–2022	Estoril	0	(0)
2021–2022	→ Vilafranquense (loan)	8	(0)
2022–2023	Feirense	2	(0)
2023–2024	Olympiakos Nicosia	0	(0)
2024-2025	Telavi	16	(0)
2025–	FK Banga	40	(2)

International career^{‡}
2021–	Guinea-Bissau	1	(0)
- * Club domestic league appearances and goals as of 13 July 2026 ‡ National team caps and goals as of 26 March 2021

Aurísio Saliu Fernandes Embalo Júnior (born 29 August 1998) known as Simão Júnior, is a professional footballer who currently plays as a centre-back for Banga Club. Born in Portugal, he played for Guinea-Bissau national football team.

== Club career ==
He made his professional debut for Cova da Piedade on 1 March 2020 in the LigaPro.

On 13 February 2025 officlally announced, that Simão Júnior signed with lithuanian Banga Club. On 22 February 2025 Simão Júnior made his debut in Supercup (Supertaurė) match against Žalgiris. On 10 August Simão Júnior scored his first goal in A Lyga against FK Riteriai. Banga Club won 2-0.

On 19 January 2026 announced about new agreement with Banga Club.

== International career ==
He made his debut for Guinea-Bissau national football team on 26 March 2021 in an AFCON 2021 qualifier against Eswatini.
