= André Liberal =

Portuguese footballer

Personal information
- Full name: André Filipe Rio Liberal
- Date of birth: 2 August 2002 (age 24)
- Place of birth: Boticas, Portugal
- Height: 1.81 m (5 ft 11 in)
- Position: Forward

Team information
- Current team: Septemvri Sofia
- Number: 27

Youth career
- 2010–2016: Boticas
- 2016–2017: Chaves
- 2017–2018: Boavista
- 2018–2019: Chaves
- 2020–2021: Famalicão

Senior career*
| Years | Team | Apps | (Gls) |
| 2019–2020 | Chaves B | 9 | (1) |
| 2021–2025 | Gil Vicente | 1 | (0) |
| 2022 | → Tirsense (loan) | 12 | (2) |
| 2023–2024 | → Vila Real (loan) | 24 | (8) |
| 2024–2025 | → Sanjoanense (loan) | 15 | (1) |
| 2025–2026 | Paços de Ferreira | 9 | (0) |
| 2025–2026 | → Sporting da Covilhã (loan) | 25 | (6) |
| 2026– | Septemvri Sofia | 11 | (2) |
- * Club domestic league appearances and goals as of 16 October 2026

André Filipe Rio Liberal (born 2 August 2002) is a Portuguese professional footballer who plays as a forward for Bulgarian First League club Septemvri Sofia.

== Professional career ==
A youth product of Boticas, Boavista, and Chaves, Liberal began his senior career with the reserves of Chaves. He spent the 2020–21 season with the reserves of Famalicão. On 23 July 2021, he transferred to Gil Vicente on a 3-year contract. He made his professional debut with Gil Vicente in a 3-0 Primeira Liga win over Boavista on 9 August 2021.

On 30 January 2025, Liberal moved on a permanent basis to Paços de Ferreira.
