= Fran Navarro =

Spanish footballer

Personal information
- Full name: Francisco José Navarro Aliaga
- Date of birth: 3 February 1998 (age 28)
- Place of birth: Valencia, Spain
- Height: 1.80 m (5 ft 11 in)
- Position: Forward

Team information
- Current team: Braga (on loan from Porto)
- Number: 39

Youth career
- Levante
- Valencia

Senior career*
Years	Team	Apps	(Gls)
2015–2021	Valencia B	98	(27)
2019–2021	Valencia	0	(0)
2019–2020	→ Lokeren (loan)	12	(1)
2021–2023	Gil Vicente	66	(33)
2023–2025	Porto	11	(0)
2023-2024	→ Olympiacos (loan)	16	(5)
2024–2025	→ Braga (loan)	10	(4)
2025–	Braga	34	(7)

International career
2013	Spain U16	2	(1)
2014–2015	Spain U17	13	(1)
2016	Spain U18	2	(0)
2015–2017	Spain U19	5	(2)
2016	Spain U20	6	(1)
- * Club domestic league appearances and goals as of 25 October 2026

Francisco José "Fran" Navarro Aliaga (Valencian pronunciation: [fɾən naˈvaro]; born 3 February 1998) is a Spanish professional footballer who plays as a forward for Portuguese club Braga on loan from Porto.

== Club career ==
=== Valencia ===
Born in Valencia, Navarro moved as a youth across the city from Levante to Valencia, where he played mostly with the reserve team in the Segunda División B. He had his sole call-up for the first team for their La Liga match at home to Villarreal on 26 January 2019, due to Kévin Gameiro's injury; he did not leave the substitutes' bench in the 3–0 win.

On 11 July 2019, Navarro was loaned to Lokeren of the Belgian First Division B for the upcoming season. He scored his first professional goal on 26 September, in a 4–2 extra-time loss to Royal Antwerp in the seventh round of the national cup, and netted his only league goal on 5 October in a 3–2 win at leaders OH Leuven.

=== Gil Vicente ===
Navarro moved to Gil Vicente of Portugal's Primeira Liga on 26 June 2021, on a three-year contract. On his league debut on 9 August, he scored twice in a 3–0 win over visitors Boavista. With 16 goals in 32 games, he finished fourth among the league's top scorers while his team qualified for Europe for the first time with fifth position and a berth in the UEFA Europa Conference League.

In 2022–23, Navarro scored 17 goals, having started all 34 games; this tally included braces in wins away to Marítimo, Casa Pia and at home to Boavista. He finished joint third with Benfica's João Mário as the league's top scorer, behind Porto's Mehdi Taremi and Gonçalo Ramos of Benfica.

=== Porto ===
On 5 July 2023, Porto signed Navarro on a five-year contract, for a reported transfer fee of €7 million. He made his debut for the club on 9 August, in the Supertaça Cândido de Oliveira, coming off the bench to replace Mehdi Taremi in the 81st minute of a 2–0 defeat to rivals Benfica. Navarro made his first start for Porto on 15 September, in a 1–0 league win away at Estrela da Amadora. He made his UEFA Champions League debut on 7 November 2023, coming off the bench to replace Evanilson in the 83rd minute of a 2–0 group stage victory at home to Royal Antwerp. On 24 November, Navarro scored his first goal for Porto, in a 4–0 home victory over Campeonato de Portugal side Montalegre, in the fourth round of the Taça de Portugal.

==== Olympiacos (loan) ====
On 1 January 2024, Porto sent Navarro on loan to Super League Greece club Olympiacos until the end of the 2023–24 season. The deal reportedly included a €7.5 million option-to-buy.

==== Braga (loan) ====
On 30 December 2024, Navarro joined Braga on loan until the end of the season, with an option to buy. Navarro signed a contract with Braga until June 2029 which would be in place if the option is exercised. On 25 September 2025, Navorro scored the winning goal against Feyenoord in the first round of the Europa League.

== Career statistics ==
=== Club ===
As of match played 29 October 2026

Appearances and goals by club, season and competition
Club	Season	League			National cup (Note: Includes Copa del Rey, Belgian Cup, Taça de Portugal, Greek Football Cup)		League cup (Note: Includes Taça da Liga)		Europe		Other		Total	
Club	Season	Division	Apps	Goals	Apps	Goals	Apps	Goals	Apps	Goals	Apps	Goals	Apps	Goals
Valencia B	2014–15	Segunda División B	2	0	—		—		—		—		2	0
Valencia B	2015–16	Segunda División B	4	1	—		—		—		—		4	1
Valencia B	2016–17	Segunda División B	4	2	—		—		—		—		4	2
Valencia B	2017–18	Segunda División B	31	4	—		—		—		—		31	4
Valencia B	2018–19	Segunda División B	35	9	—		—		—		—		35	9
Valencia B	2020–21	Segunda División B	22	11	—		—		—		—		22	11
Valencia B	Total		98	27	—		—		—		—		98	27
Valencia	2018–19	La Liga	0	0	0	0	—		—		—		0	0
Lokeren (loan)	2019–20	Belgian First Division B	12	1	2	1	—		—		—		14	2
Gil Vicente	2021–22	Primeira Liga	32	16	1	0	2	0	—		—		35	16
Gil Vicente	2022–23	Primeira Liga	34	17	2	0	4	2	3 (Note: Appearances in UEFA Conference League)	2	—		43	21
Gil Vicente	Total		66	33	3	0	6	2	3	2	—		78	37
Porto	2023–24	Primeira Liga	6	0	2	1	0	0	1 (Note: Appearance in UEFA Champions League)	0	1 (Note: Appearance in Supertaça Cândido de Oliveira)	0	10	1
Porto	2024–25	Primeira Liga	4	0	1	0	0	0	0	0	1	0	6	0
Porto	Total		10	0	3	1	0	0	1	0	1	0	16	1
Olympiacos (loan)	2023–24	Super League Greece	16	5	2	0	—		0	0	—		18	5
Braga	2024–25	Primeira Liga	10	4	2	0	1	0	0	0	—		13	4
Braga	2025–26	Primeira Liga	28	6	4	1	3	1	19 (Note: Appearances in UEFA Europa League)	4	—		54	12
Braga	2026–27	Primeira Liga	6	1	0	0	1	0	6	1	—		13	2
Braga	Total		34	7	4	1	4	1	24	5	—		67	14
Career total			248	77	16	3	11	3	29	7	2	0	304	90

== Honours ==
Porto

- Supertaça Cândido de Oliveira: 2024

Individual

- Primeira Liga Forward of the Month: December 2022/January 2023, February 2023
