= Talocha =

Portuguese footballer

Personal information
- Full name: João Carlos Araújo Fonseca Silva
- Date of birth: 30 August 1989 (age 37)
- Place of birth: Antas, Portugal
- Height: 1.80 m (5 ft 11 in)
- Position: Left-back

Team information
- Current team: Oliveirense

Youth career
- 2000–2007: Famalicão

Senior career*
Years	Team	Apps	(Gls)
2007–2013	Famalicão	114	(2)
2013–2016	Vizela	94	(6)
2016–2019	Boavista	93	(3)
2019–2020	Atromitos	9	(0)
2020	Riga	2	(0)
2020–2022	Gil Vicente	63	(2)
2022–2024	Farense	47	(0)
2024–2025	Tondela	29	(3)
2025–2026	Varzim	26	(1)
2026–	Oliveirense	2	(0)
- * Club domestic league appearances and goals as of 15:25, 29 September 2026 (UTC)

João Carlos Araújo Fonseca Silva (born 30 August 1989), known as Talocha, is a Portuguese professional footballer who plays as a left-back for Oliveirense.

== Club career ==
Born in Antas, Vila Nova de Famalicão, Talocha developed at F.C. Famalicão, and played his first senior matches for his hometown club in the lower divisions, including their 2008–09 nadir in the Braga Football Association's first district league. He transferred across the third tier to F.C. Vizela in 2013. On 17 December of the following year, he scored twice against Sporting CP in the last 16 of the Taça de Portugal, albeit in a 3–2 home loss.

On 29 May 2016, Talocha jumped two divisions to the Primeira Liga, signing for Boavista F.C. on a two-year deal. He made his professional debut in the season-opening 2–0 home win over F.C. Arouca, on 14 August. Having barely missed a game, he got his first goal on 14 January 2018 to open a win by the same score against Portimonense S.C. also at the Estádio do Bessa, after a free kick by David Simão.

When Talocha was about to become a free agent in May 2018, Boavista gave him a new deal for the next two years. A year later, he completed a century of appearances with the side from Porto in a match with C.S. Marítimo, amidst interest from other clubs.

On 5 August 2019, Talocha reached an agreement to end his contract with a year remaining and headed abroad for the first time, to Atromitos F.C. in Super League Greece; his former employers remained 20% of his economic rights. He switched to the Latvian Higher League the following transfer window, joining champions Riga FC.

Talocha returned to the Portuguese top flight on 7 August 2020, signing a two-year deal with Gil Vicente F.C. He then moved to the Liga Portugal 2 with S.C. Farense, achieving promotion in the 2022–23 campaign.

On 21 August 2024, Talocha joined second-tier C.D. Tondela on a two-year contract. He totalled 30 matches in his only season as they promoted as champions, but was not retained subsequently.

In September 2025, aged 36, Talocha signed for Liga 3 club Varzim SC.

== Honours ==
Tondela

- Liga Portugal 2: 2024–25
