= Stanislav Kritsyuk =

Russian footballer

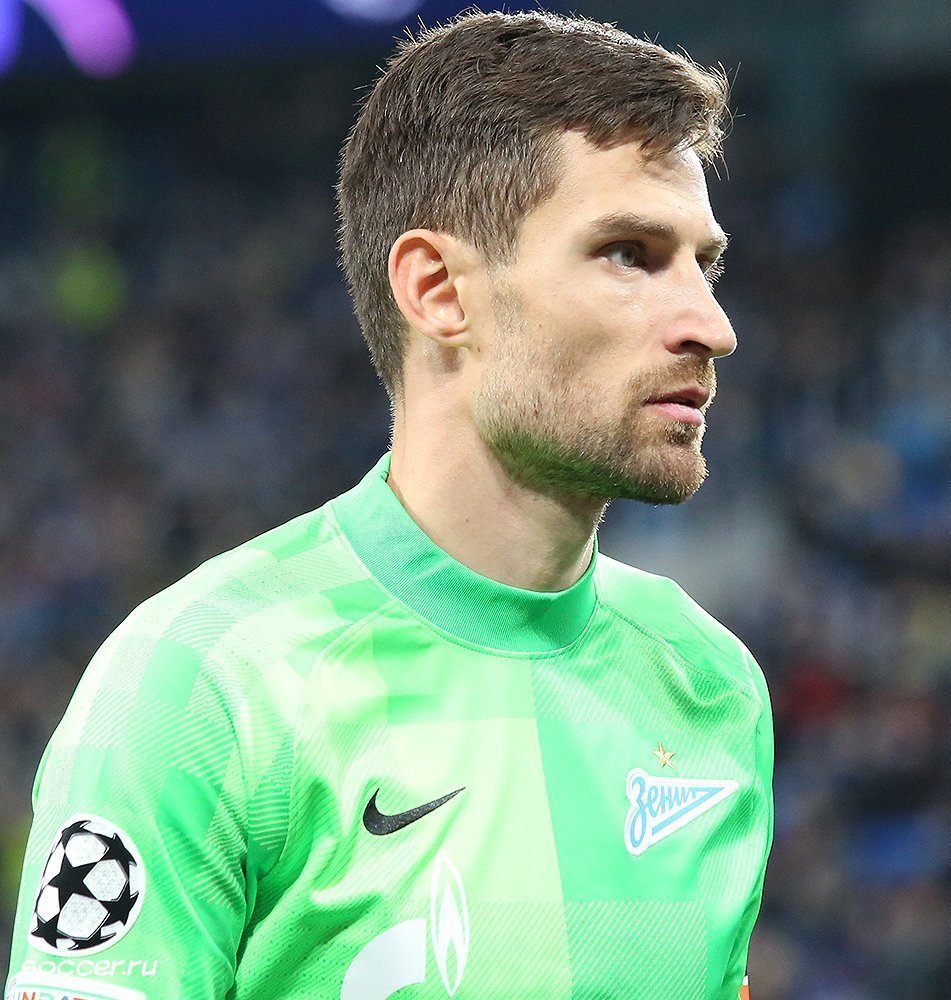
- Kritsyuk with Zenit Saint Petersburg in 2021

Personal information
- Full name: Stanislav Vasilyevich Kritsyuk
- Date of birth: 1 December 1990 (age 35)
- Place of birth: Tolyatti, Soviet Union
- Height: 1.92 m (6 ft 4 in)
- Position: Goalkeeper

Youth career
- 1998–2004: Lada Tolyatti
- 2004–2008: Konoplyov football academy

Senior career*
Years	Team	Apps	(Gls)
2008	Academia Dimitrovgrad	4	(0)
2008–2009	Togliatti	18	(0)
2010–2012	Akademiya Togliatti	39	(0)
2013–2014	Braga B	14	(0)
2013–2016	Braga	29	(0)
2014	→ Rio Ave (loan)	1	(0)
2016	→ FC Krasnodar (loan)	12	(0)
2016–2020	FC Krasnodar	37	(0)
2019	FC Krasnodar-2	1	(0)
2020–2021	Belenenses SAD	27	(0)
2021	Gil Vicente	4	(0)
2021–2022	Zenit Saint Petersburg	7	(0)
2022–2024	Gil Vicente	11	(0)
2024	Tyumen	3	(0)

International career^{‡}
2012–2013	Russia U21	3	(0)
2016	Russia	2	(0)
- * Club domestic league appearances and goals as of 1 December 2024 ‡ National team caps and goals as of 10 November 2016

Stanislav Vasilyevich Kritsyuk (Russian: Станислав Васильевич Крицюк; born 1 December 1990) is a Russian former professional footballer who played as a goalkeeper.

== Club career ==
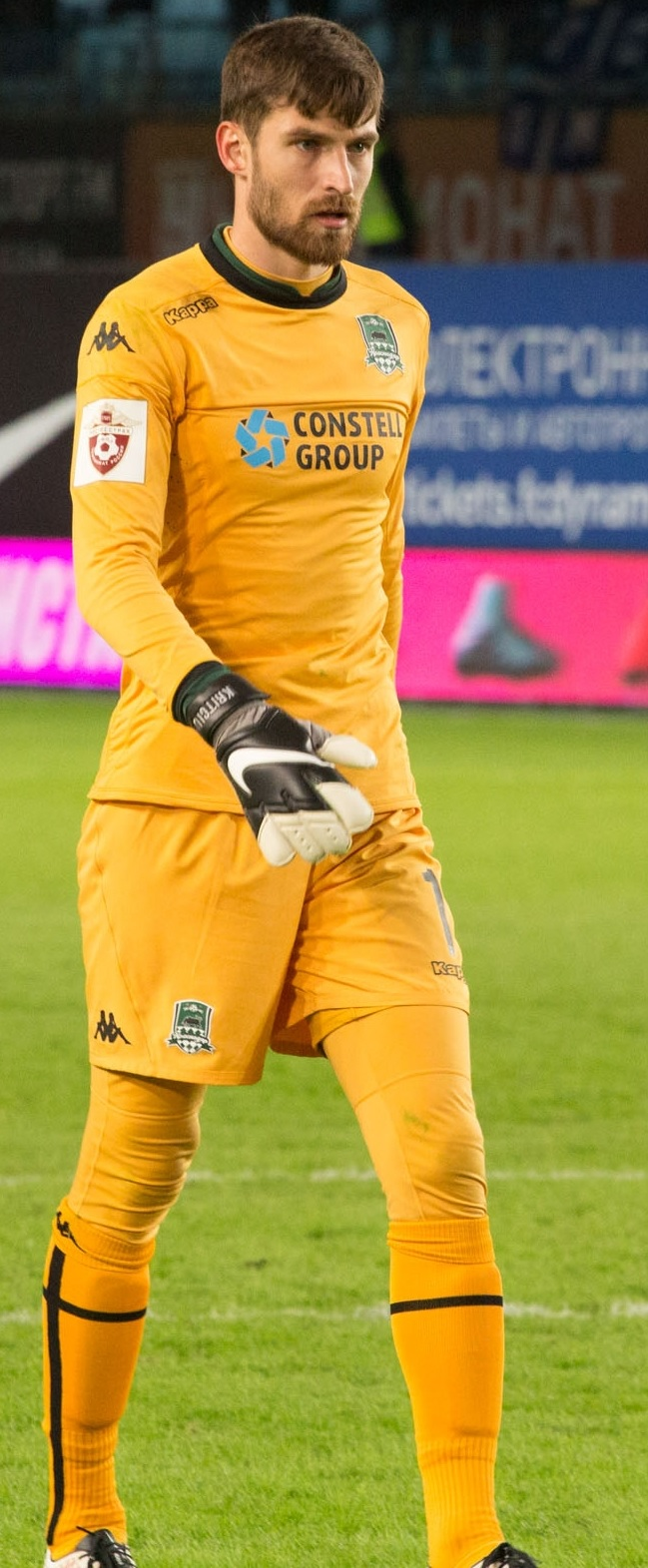
Kritsyuk with Krasnodar in 2016

He made his Russian Premier League debut for FC Krasnodar on 5 March 2016 in a game against FC Zenit Saint Petersburg.

After finishing the 2015–16 season with FC Krasnodar on loan from Braga, Kritsyuk's rights were bought out by Krasnodar and he signed a 4-year contract with the club on 30 May 2016.

On 20 July 2020, he was released from his Krasnodar contract by mutual consent.

On 29 September 2020, he joined Belenenses SAD.

On 21 June 2021, he signed a 3-year contract with Gil Vicente.

On 2 September 2021, he returned to Russia and signed a one-year deal (with an option to extend for another year) with FC Zenit Saint Petersburg.

On 21 June 2022, Zenit confirmed that Kritsyuk's contract with the club was terminated by mutual consent. On the same day, Gil Vicente confirmed his return.

== International ==
On 11 March 2016, he was called up to the Russia national football team for friendly games against Lithuania and France. He made his debut for the national team on 26 March in a game against Lithuania.

== Personal life ==
On 4 March 2022, after the death of a Ukrainian youth soccer coach, he called for peace following the invasion of Ukraine by Russia, but stopped short of condemning the invasion.

== Honours ==
=== Club ===
Braga

- Taça da Liga: 2012-13

Zenit Saint Petersburg

- Russian Premier League: 2021–22

== Career statistics ==
As of match played 12 February 2023

Appearances and goals by club, season and competition
Club	Season	League			National cup		League cup		Continental		Total	
Club	Season	Division	Apps	Goals	Apps	Goals	Apps	Goals	Apps	Goals	Apps	Goals
Akademiya Dimitrovgrad	2008	Russian Second Division	4	0	0	0	—		—		4	0
Togliatti	2008	Russian Second Division	9	0	0	0	—		—		9	0
Togliatti	2009	Russian Second Division	9	0	1	0	—		—		10	0
Togliatti	Total		18	0	1	0	—		—		19	0
Akademiya Tolyatti	2010	Russian Second Division	20	0	0	0	—		—		20	0
Akademiya Tolyatti	2011–12	Russian Second Division	13	0	0	0	—		—		13	0
Akademiya Tolyatti	2012–13	Russian Second Division	6	0	0	0	—		—		6	0
Akademiya Tolyatti	Total		39	0	0	0	—		—		39	0
Braga B	2012–13	Segunda Liga	4	0	—		—		—		4	0
Braga B	2013–14	Segunda Liga	10	0	—		—		—		10	0
Braga B	Total		14	0	—		—		—		14	0
Rio Ave (loan)	2013–14	Primeira Liga	1	0	0	0	2	0	—		3	0
Braga	2014–15	Primeira Liga	11	0	7	0	3	0	—		21	0
Braga	2015–16	Primeira Liga	18	0	0	0	0	0	0	0	18	0
Braga	Total		29	0	7	0	3	0	0	0	39	0
FC Krasnodar (loan)	2015–16	Russian Premier League	12	0	2	0	—		0	0	14	0
FC Krasnodar	2016–17	Russian Premier League	20	0	1	0	—		10 (Note: Appearances in UEFA Europa League)	0	31	0
FC Krasnodar	2017–18	Russian Premier League	4	0	0	0	—		0	0	4	0
FC Krasnodar	2018–19	Russian Premier League	12	0	1	0	—		4	0	17	0
FC Krasnodar	2019–20	Russian Premier League	1	0	1	0	—		4 (Note: One appearance in UEFA Champions League, three appearances in UEFA Europa League)	0	6	0
FC Krasnodar	Total		49	0	5	0	—		18	0	72	0
FC Krasnodar-2	2019–20	Russian Football National League	1	0	—		—		—		1	0
Belenenses SAD	2020–21	Primeira Liga	27	0	0	0	—		—		27	0
Gil Vicente	2021–22	Primeira Liga	4	0	0	0	2	0	—		6	0
Zenit Saint Petersburg	2021–22	Russian Premier League	7	0	0	0	—		4 (Note: Appearances in UEFA Champions League)	0	11	0
Gil Vicente	2022–23	Primeira Liga	11	0	1	0	3	0	0	0	15	0
Gil Vicente	2023–24	Primeira Liga	0	0	0	0	0	0	—		0	0
Gil Vicente	Total		11	0	1	0	3	0	0	0	15	0
Career total			204	0	14	0	10	0	22	0	250	0
