= Giorgi Aburjania =

Georgian footballer (born 1995)

Personal information
- Date of birth: 2 January 1995 (age 31)
- Place of birth: Tbilisi, Georgia
- Height: 1.87 m (6 ft 2 in)
- Position: Defensive midfielder

Team information
- Current team: Odisha

Youth career
- 2010–2012: Metalurgi Rustavi
- 2012: → Olimpiki Tbilisi (loan)

Senior career*
Years	Team	Apps	(Gls)
2011	Metalurgi Rustavi	3	(0)
2012–2014	Dila	17	(1)
2014	Lokomotivi Tbilisi	9	(5)
2014–2016	Anorthosis	42	(2)
2016	Gimnàstic	16	(2)
2016–2020	Sevilla B	35	(0)
2018–2019	→ Lugo (loan)	27	(1)
2019–2020	→ Twente (loan)	19	(2)
2020–2021	Oviedo	2	(0)
2021	Cartagena	13	(1)
2021–2023	Gil Vicente	53	(2)
2023–2024	Hatayspor	20	(0)
2024–2025	AVS	9	(0)
2025–2026	Jeddah	0	(0)
2026–	Odisha	1	(0)

International career^{‡}
2011–2012	Georgia U17	12	(0)
2012–2014	Georgia U19	8	(2)
2015–2016	Georgia U21	6	(0)
2016–	Georgia	39	(1)
- * Club domestic league appearances and goals as of 14 October 2026 ‡ National team caps and goals as of 20:04, 4 October 2023 (UTC)

Giorgi Aburjania (Georgian: გიორგი აბურჯანია, romanized: giorgi aburjania, pronounced [ɡioɾɡi abuɾdʒania]; born 2 January 1995) is a Georgian professional footballer who plays as a defensive midfielder for Indian Super League club Odisha and the Georgia national team.

== Club career ==
Aburjania kicked off his career with Metalurgi Rustavi in 2010. He then had stints with Dila and Lokomotivi Tbilisi. On 17 June 2014, he signed for Cypriot club Anorthosis Famagusta on a two-year contract.

On 8 January 2016, Aburjania moved to Spain, after agreeing to a three-and-a-half-year contract with Segunda División side Gimnàstic de Tarragona. He made his debut for the club late in the month, coming on as a second-half substitute for Lévy Madinda in a 2–1 home win against CD Tenerife.

Aburjania subsequently became an undisputed starter for Vicente Moreno's side, and scored his first goal for the club on 20 March 2016 in a 4–0 away routing of Bilbao Athletic. On 2 August he signed a four-year contract with Sevilla FC, being assigned to the reserves also in the second division, for a rumoured fee of € 1 million.

On 1 August 2018, after suffering relegation, Aburjania was loaned to fellow second division side CD Lugo, for one year. In July of the following year, he moved to FC Twente also in a temporary deal.

On 20 September 2020, Aburjania agreed to a one-year contract with Real Oviedo in the second division. The following 28 January, after being rarely used, he cut ties with the club and signed a short-term deal with fellow league team FC Cartagena just hours later.

On 3 July 2021, free agent Aburjania signed a two-year deal with Primeira Liga side Gil Vicente.

On 8 September 2025, Aburjania joined Saudi FDL club Jeddah.

On 24 August 2026, Aburjania completed a move to Indian Super League club Odisha FC.

== International career ==
After representing Georgia at the under-17, under-19 and under-21 levels, Aburjania made his debut with the full squad on 29 March 2016, starting in a 1–1 friendly draw against Kazakhstan.

== Career statistics ==
=== Club ===
As of match played 19 January 2025

Appearances and goals by club, season and competition
Club	Season	League			National cup (Note: Includes Georgian Cup, Cypriot Cup, Copa del Rey, KNVB Cup, Taça de Portugal, Turkish Cup)		League cup (Note: Includes Taça da Liga)		Continental		Other		Total	
Club	Season	Division	Apps	Goals	Apps	Goals	Apps	Goals	Apps	Goals	Apps	Goals	Apps	Goals
Metalurgi Rustavi	2010-11	Umaglesi Liga	3	0	0	0	—		0	0	0	0	3	0
Metalurgi Rustavi	2011-12	Umaglesi Liga	0	0	0	0	—		2 (Note: Appearance(s) in UEFA Europa League)	0	—		2	0
Metalurgi Rustavi	Total		3	0	0	0	—		2	0	0	0	5	0
Dila	2012-13	Umaglesi Liga	5	1	3	0	—		0	0	0	0	8	1
Dila	2013-14	Umaglesi Liga	12	0	1	0	—		4	0	—		17	0
Dila	Total		17	1	4	0	—		4	0	0	0	25	1
Locomotive Tbilisi	2013-14	Pirveli Liga	9	5	0	0	—		—		—		9	5
Anorthosis	2014-15	Cypriot First Division	30	2	3	0	—		—		—		33	2
Anorthosis	2015-16	Cypriot First Division	12	0	0	0	—		—		—		12	0
Anorthosis	Total		42	2	0	0	—		—		—		42	2
Gimnàstic	2015-16	Segunda División	16	2	0	0	—		—		0	0	16	2
Sevilla B	2016-17	Segunda División	13	0	—		—		—		—		13	0
Sevilla B	2017-18	Segunda División	22	0	—		—		—		—		22	0
Sevilla B	2018-19	Segunda División B	0	0	—		—		—		—		0	0
Sevilla B	2019-20	Segunda División B	0	0	—		—		—		—		0	0
Sevilla B	Total		35	0	—		—		—		—		35	0
Lugo (loan)	2018-19	Segunda División	23	1	3	0	—		—		—		26	1
Twente (loan)	2019-20	Eredivisie	17	2	2	0	—		—		—		19	2
Real Oviedo	2020-21	Segunda División	2	0	2	0	—		—		—		4	0
Cartagena	2020-21	Segunda División	13	1	0	0	—		—		—		13	1
Gil Vicente	2021-22	Primeira Liga	26	2	2	0	0	0	—		—		28	2
Gil Vicente	2022-23	Primeira Liga	27	0	2	0	3	0	3 (Note: Appearance(s) in UEFA Europa Conference League)	0	—		35	0
Gil Vicente	Total		53	2	4	0	3	0	3	0	—		63	2
Hatayspor	2023-24	Süper Lig	20	0	1	0	—		—		—		21	0
AVS	2024-25	Primeira Liga	8	0	1	0	0	0	—		—		9	0
Career total			258	16	20	0	3	0	9	0	0	0	290	16

=== International ===
As of match played 8 September 2023

Appearances and goals by national team and year
National team	Year	Apps	Goals
Georgia	2016	3	0
Georgia	2017	3	0
Georgia	2018	6	0
Georgia	2019	4	0
Georgia	2020	3	0
Georgia	2021	10	1
Georgia	2022	7	0
Georgia	2023	3	0
Total		39	1

Scores and results list Georgia's goal tally first, score column indicates score after each Aburjania goal.

List of international goals scored by Giorgi Aburjania
No.	Date	Venue	Opponent	Score	Result	Competition	Ref.
1	2 June 2021	Ilie Oană Stadium, Ploiești, Romania	Romania	2–0	2–1	Friendly	
