= Matheus Bueno =

Brazilian footballer

- Matheus Bueno with Kashima Antlers in 2026

Personal information
- Full name: Matheus Bueno Batista
- Date of birth: 30 July 1998 (age 28)
- Place of birth: Curitiba, Brazil
- Height: 5 ft 10 in (1.78 m)
- Position: Attacking midfielder

Team information
- Current team: Kashima Antlers
- Number: 8

Youth career
- 2013–2015: Novo Mundo, Curitiba
- 2016–2018: Coritiba

Senior career*
Years	Team	Apps	(Gls)
2018–2021	Coritiba	49	(0)
2021–2023	Gil Vicente	51	(1)
2023–2024	Guarani	77	(3)
2025–2026	Shimizu S-Pulse	55	(2)
2026–	Kashima Antlers	8	(0)
- * Club domestic league appearances and goals as of 21:33, 23 September 2026 (UTC)

Matheus Bueno Batista (born 30 July 1998) is a Brazilian professional footballer who plays as an attacking midfielder for J1 League club Kashima Antlers.

== Career ==
Matheus Bueno initially played amateur football, for a club called Novo Mundo in Curitiba. He was spotted in a friendly with Coritiba in early 2016 and ended up signing. In 2018 he worked with the under-20 team, and was part of the squad for the Copa São Paulo de Futebol Júnior before being promoted to the first team for the Campeonato Paranaense. In the final part of the 2018 Campeonato Brasileiro Série B season he made a return to the first team, making his national league debut as a substitute in a 5–2 defeat against São Bento on 6 November 2018.

On 22 June 2021, he signed a three-year contract with Portuguese club Gil Vicente in the Primeira Liga.

In June 2026, it was announced that Bueno would be joining J1 League club Kashima Antlers.
