= Zé Carlos (footballer, born 1998) =

Portuguese footballer

Personal information
- Full name: José Carlos Teixeira Lopes dos Reis Gonçalves
- Date of birth: 31 July 1998 (age 28)
- Place of birth: Lousada, Portugal
- Height: 1.77 m (5 ft 10 in)
- Position: Right-back

Team information
- Current team: Rio Ave
- Number: 2

Youth career
- 2008–2009: Lousada
- 2009–2010: Alfenense
- 2010–2011: Boavista
- 2011–2017: Leixões

Senior career*
Years	Team	Apps	(Gls)
2017–2018	Salgueiros	0	(0)
2018–2020	Leça	51	(4)
2020	Leixões	5	(0)
2020–2023	Braga	4	(0)
2021–2022	→ Gil Vicente (loan)	30	(0)
2022–2023	→ Ibiza (loan)	6	(0)
2023	→ Gil Vicente (loan)	8	(0)
2023–2026	Gil Vicente	89	(1)
2026–	Rio Ave	3	(0)
- * Club domestic league appearances and goals as of 22:25, 8 November 2026 (UTC)

José Carlos Teixeira Lopes dos Reis Gonçalves (born 31 July 1998), known as Zé Carlos, is a Portuguese professional footballer who plays as a right-back for Primeira Liga club Rio Ave.

== Club career ==
Born in Lousada, Porto District, Zé Carlos spent most of his youth career with Leixões S.C. before beginning as a senior in the lower leagues with S.C. Salgueiros and Leça FC. In January 2018, he returned to Leixões on a 2 1/2-year deal to cover the injury of Edu Machado. He made his professional debut in LigaPro on 8 February in a 1–0 win against Varzim S.C. at home.

On 30 July 2020, Zé Carlos signed a four-year contract with Primeira Liga club S.C. Braga. He played his first match in the competition on 28 December, coming on as a 50th-minute substitute for Nuno Sequeira in the 4–1 away victory over Boavista FC.

Zé Carlos spent the following two seasons on loan, at Gil Vicente FC (twice) and UD Ibiza (Spanish Segunda División). In his first spell at the former, he was a key member of a Ricardo Soares-led side that qualified for the UEFA Europa Conference League – first ever in their history – after a fifth-place finish.

On 21 June 2023, Braga announced the transfer of Zé Carlos to Gil Vicente on a permanent basis, while retaining 50% of the player's economic rights; he agreed to a three-year deal. He scored his only goal in the top division on 2 October, opening the 2–0 home victory over Casa Pia AC.

On 10 September 2026, Zé Carlos joined Rio Ave F.C. on a two-year contract.
