= Žiga Frelih =

Slovenian footballer (born 1998)

Personal information
- Date of birth: 6 February 1998 (age 28)
- Place of birth: Ljubljana, Slovenia
- Height: 1.97 m (6 ft 6 in)
- Position: Goalkeeper

Team information
- Current team: Celje
- Number: 23

Youth career
- Idrija
- –2015: Bravo
- 2016–2017: Domžale

Senior career*
Years	Team	Apps	(Gls)
2015–2016	Bravo	19	(0)
2015–2016	→ Celje (loan)	0	(0)
2016–2017	Domžale	0	(0)
2017–2019	Krško	17	(0)
2019–2020	Inter Zaprešić	22	(1)
2020–2021	Olimpija Ljubljana	36	(0)
2021–2022	Gil Vicente	19	(0)
2022	→ Chaves (loan)	0	(0)
2023	Mirandés	1	(0)
2023–2024	Zemplín Michalovce	18	(0)
2024–2026	Spartak Trnava	53	(0)
2026–	Celje	2	(0)

International career
2019	Slovenia U21	5	(0)
- * Club domestic league appearances and goals as of 12 September 2026

Žiga Frelih (born 6 February 1998) is a Slovenian professional footballer who plays as a goalkeeper for Slovenian PrvaLiga club Celje.

== Club career ==
Frelih is a youth product of Bravo, and began his senior career in the Slovenian third division in 2015. He was later the reserve goalkeeper at Celje and Domžale. Frelih transferred to Krško in 2017, and made his first senior appearance with them in a 0–0 Slovenian Football Cup tie with Ilirija 1911 on 16 August 2017. He made his top division debut for Krško in a 1–0 loss to Olimpija Ljubljana on 8 April 2018.

In 2019, Frelih moved to Croatian club Inter Zaprešić. There, he scored his first goal of his career in a 2–2 draw with Istra on 4 October 2019 in the 92nd minute of the game. After earning his spot as a starter there, he returned to Slovenia and signed with Olimpija Ljubljana in August 2020. He stayed at the club for one year, before his contract was terminated in July 2021 due to alleged violation of disciplinary rules.

In September 2021, Frelih signed a three-year contract with Primeira Liga side Gil Vicente. On 1 August 2022, he was loaned to Chaves, but left the club late in the month due to personal problems, and subsequently rescinded his contract with Gil Vicente.

On 3 February 2023, Frelih moved to Spain and was announced at Segunda División side Mirandés.

On 11 October 2023, Frelih joined Slovak First Football League club Zemplín Michalovce. He made his debut for the club in a 2–0 loss at home against Slovan Bratislava. During the season, Frelih set a league record for the longest time without conceding a goal, with 520 minutes.

On 16 June 2024, Frelih joined fellow Slovak First League club Spartak Trnava, signing a two-year contract. He made his debut for Spartak in the first round of the Conference League qualifiers against Bosnian club Sarajevo, where he was able to keep a clean sheet. In his first season, Frelih won the 2024–25 Slovak Cup with Spartak after beating MFK Ružomberok 1–0 in the final.

== International career ==
Frelih was a youth international for Slovenia, having represented the Slovenia under-21 team. He was called-up to train with the senior team in March 2021.

== Honours ==
Domžale

- Slovenian Cup: 2016–17

Olimpija Ljubljana

- Slovenian Cup: 2020–21

Spartak Trnava

- Slovak Cup: 2024–25
