= Andrew Ventura =

Brazilian footballer (born 2001)

Personal information
- Full name: Andrew da Silva Ventura
- Date of birth: 1 July 2001 (age 25)
- Place of birth: Duque de Caxias, Brazil
- Height: 1.89 m (6 ft 2 in)
- Position: Goalkeeper

Team information
- Current team: Flamengo
- Number: 42

Youth career
- 2010–2018: Botafogo

Senior career*
| Years | Team | Apps | (Gls) |
| 2018–2021 | Botafogo | 0 | (0) |
| 2020 | → Maranhão (loan) | 0 | (0) |
| 2021–2026 | Gil Vicente | 116 | (0) |
| 2026– | Flamengo | 3 | (0) |

International career
| 2023 | Brazil U23 | 1 | (0) |
Medal record
Men's football
Representing Brazil
Pan American Games
| Winner | 2023 Santiago |
- * Club domestic league appearances and goals as of 23:39, 15 January 2026 (UTC)

Andrew da Silva Ventura (born 1 July 2001), known as Andrew Ventura or just Andrew, is a Brazilian professional footballer who plays as a goalkeeper for Campeonato Brasileiro Série A club Flamengo.

== Club career ==
Andrew joined the youth academy of Botafogo at the age of 9, and in 2018 was moved up to their senior team as reserve goalkeeper. He moved to Maranhão on loan in July 2020, until September 2020.

On 21 July 2021, he moved to the Portuguese club Gil Vicente on a free transfer signing a 3-year contract. He made his professional debut with Gil Vicente in a 2–1 Primeira Liga win over Benfica on 2 February 2022.

On 12 January 2026, Andrew returned to Brazil, joining Série A club Flamengo on a four-year contract, for a fee reported to be around €1.5 million.

== International career ==
Andrew was called up to a training camp for the Brazil U18s in July 2019.

== Personal life ==
Andrew is the brother of Andrey, who is also a Brazilian football goalkeeper.

== Career statistics ==
As of match played 18 May 2024

Appearances and goals by club, season and competition
| Club | Season | League | | | State league | | National cup | | League cup | | Continental | | Total | |
| Club | Season | Division | Apps | Goals | Apps | Goals | Apps | Goals | Apps | Goals | Apps | Goals | Apps | Goals |
|---|---|---|---|---|---|---|---|---|---|---|---|---|---|---|
| Botafogo | 2020 | Série A | 0 | 0 | 0 | 0 | 0 | 0 | — | | — | | 0 | 0 |
| Botafogo | 2021 | Série B | 0 | 0 | 0 | 0 | 0 | 0 | — | | — | | 0 | 0 |
| Botafogo | Total | | 0 | 0 | 0 | 0 | 0 | 0 | — | | — | | 0 | 0 |
| Gil Vicente | 2021–22 | Primeira Liga | 10 | 0 | — | | 1 | 0 | 0 | 0 | — | | 11 | 0 |
| Gil Vicente | 2022–23 | Primeira Liga | 24 | 0 | — | | 0 | 0 | 1 | 0 | 3 | 0 | 28 | 0 |
| Gil Vicente | 2023–24 | Primeira Liga | 32 | 0 | — | | 2 | 0 | 1 | 0 | — | | 35 | 0 |
| Gil Vicente | Total | | 66 | 0 | — | | 3 | 0 | 2 | 0 | 3 | 0 | 74 | 0 |
| Career total | | | 66 | 0 | 0 | 0 | 3 | 0 | 2 | 0 | 3 | 0 | 74 | 0 |

== Honours ==
Individual

- Primeira Liga Goalkeeper of the Month: September/October 2025, November 2025
