= Lucas Cunha (footballer, born January 1997) =

Brazilian footballer

Personal information
- Full name: Lucas de Souza Cunha
- Date of birth: 23 January 1997 (age 29)
- Place of birth: Três Lagoas, Brazil
- Height: 1.86 m (6 ft 1 in)
- Position: Centre back

Team information
- Current team: Ponte Preta (on loan from Red Bull Bragantino)
- Number: 3

Youth career
- 2014: Mirassol
- 2014–2015: Braga

Senior career*
Years	Team	Apps	(Gls)
2015–2019	Braga B	67	(1)
2019–2021	Braga	3	(0)
2020	→ Estoril (loan)	3	(0)
2020–2021	→ Celta Vigo B (loan)	23	(0)
2021–2022	Gil Vicente	47	(2)
2023–	Red Bull Bragantino	25	(0)
2025	→ Sport Recife (loan)	9	(0)
2026–	→ Ponte Preta (loan)	27	(0)

International career
2017	Brazil U20	4	(0)
- * Club domestic league appearances and goals as of 18 November 2026

Lucas de Souza Cunha (born 23 January 1997) is a Brazilian professional footballer who plays as a centre back for Ponte Preta, on loan from Red Bull Bragantino.

== Club career ==
Born in Três Lagoas, Mato Grosso, Cunha played as a youth for Mirassol in São Paulo state before joining Braga.

Cunha made his professional debut in the Segunda Liga for Braga B on 30 September 2015 in a 1–0 loss at Covilhã. He scored his first goal on 19 April 2017 in a 3–1 win at S.C. Olhanense, from the penalty spot.

On 25 August 2019, Cunha debuted in Primeira Liga for Braga's first team, in a 1–1 draw at Gil Vicente. Days earlier, he signed a new four-year deal with a €25 million buyout clause. With only two more appearances to his name – including a UEFA Europa League debut – he moved on loan to Estoril of the second division for the rest of the season.

On 10 September 2020, Cunha joined La Liga side Celta de Vigo on loan, being initially assigned to the reserves in Segunda División B.

On 30 June 2021, he joined Primeira Liga club Gil Vicente on a three-year contract.

== International ==
Cunha represented Brazil under-20 at the 2017 South American Youth Football Championship.

== Career statistics ==
As of match played 14 February 2021

Appearances and goals by club, season and competition
Club	Season	League			National cup		League cup		Continental		Other		Total	
Club	Season	Division	Apps	Goals	Apps	Goals	Apps	Goals	Apps	Goals	Apps	Goals	Apps	Goals
Mirassol	2013	Serie D	0	0	—		—		—		2 (Note: Appearances in Copa Paulista)	0	2	0
Mirassol	2014	Serie D	0	0	—		—		—		3	0	3	0
Mirassol	Total		0	0	0	0	0	0	0	0	5	0	5	0
Braga B	2014–15	Segunda Liga	0	0	—		—		—		—		0	0
Braga B	2015–16	LigaPro	9	0	—		—		—		—		9	0
Braga B	2016–17	LigaPro	23	1	—		—		—		—		23	1
Braga B	2017–18	LigaPro	30	0	—		—		—		—		30	0
Braga B	2018–19	LigaPro	2	0	—		—		—		—		2	0
Braga B	2019–20	Campeonato de Portugal	3	0	—		—		—		—		3	0
Braga B	Total		67	1	0	0	0	0	0	0	0	0	67	1
Braga	2016–17	Primeira Liga	0	0	0	0	0	0	—		—		0	0
Braga	2018–19	Primeira Liga	0	0	0	0	0	0	—		—		0	0
Braga	2019–20	Primeira Liga	2	0	0	0	0	0	1 (Note: Appearance in UEFA Europa League)	0	—		3	0
Braga	Total		2	0	0	0	0	0	1	0	0	0	3	0
Estoril (loan)	2019–20	LigaPro	3	0	0	0	0	0	—		—		3	0
Celta B (loan)	2020–21	Segunda División B	13	0	0	0	—		—		—		13	0
Career total			85	1	0	0	0	0	1	0	5	0	91	1
