= 2025 FIFA Club World Cup Group A =

Soccer tournament group stage

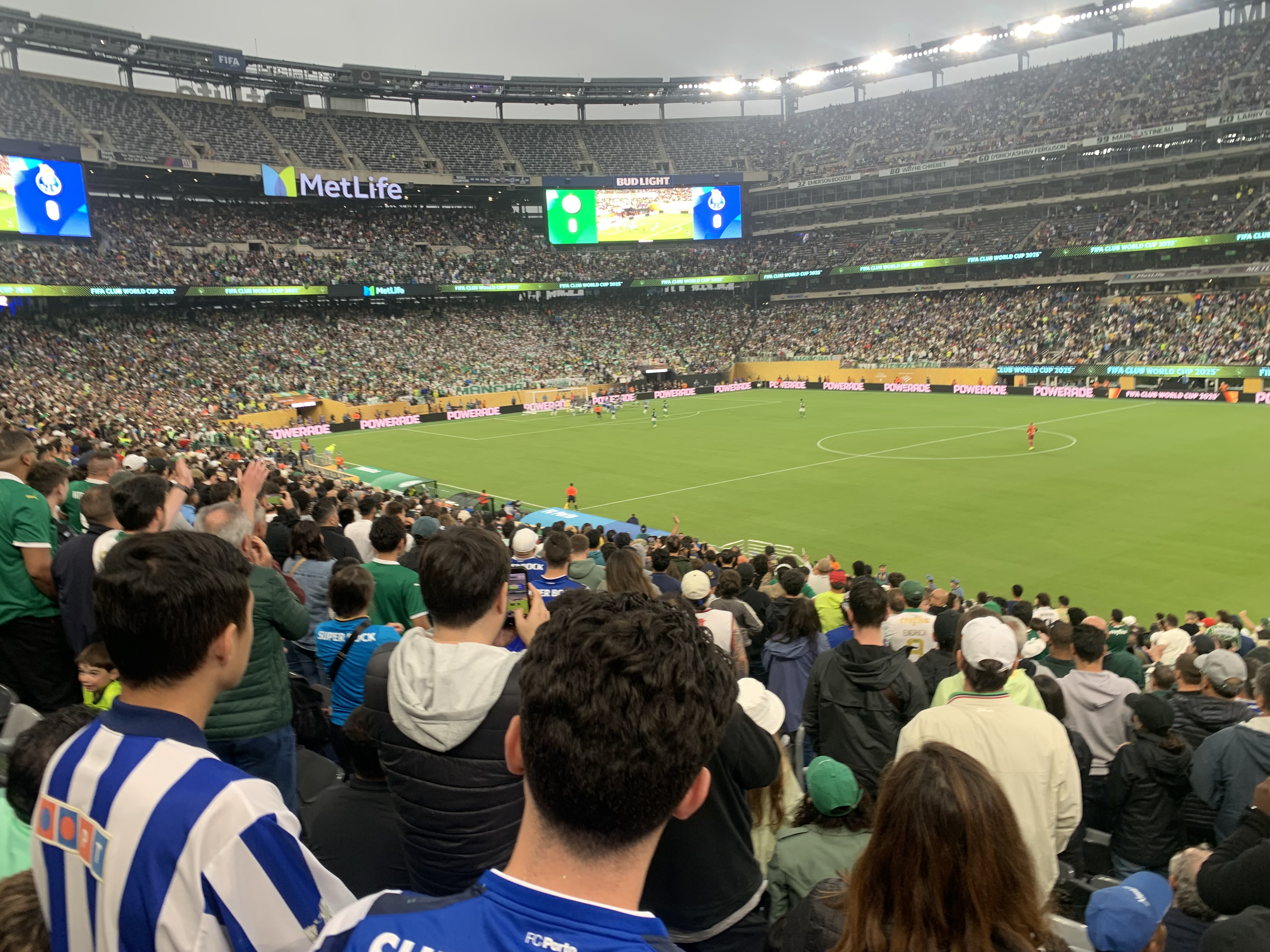
Scene of Palmeiras vs Porto match at MetLife Stadium in East Rutherford, New Jersey

Group A was one of eight groups in the 2025 FIFA Club World Cup, an international club soccer tournament hosted in the United States and organized by FIFA. It comprised four teams: Palmeiras of Brazil; Porto of Portugal; Al Ahly of Egypt; and host Inter Miami CF of the United States. Teams qualified by winning the respective continental club championships of their confederation, through a ranking of their performance in competitions, or as the representative of the host association. Only two clubs per country were allowed to qualify unless three or four won their respective continental club championship. The 2025 edition of the FIFA Club World Cup was the first in the tournament's history to be played under its quadrennial format with 32 teams. The group's matches began on June 14 and concluded on June 23.

== Teams ==
The four teams in Group A were decided by the FIFA Club World Cup draw held by FIFA on December 5, 2024, in the Miami area. The 32 participants were divided into four pots based on their confederation and ranking within FIFA's club ranking system. Each of the eight groups would receive one team from each pot. Teams from the same confederation could not be drawn into the same group except for those from UEFA, which had twelve slots; teams from the same national association were not able to be drawn into the same group. For scheduling purposes, Inter Miami CF were automatically placed in Group A but remained in their assigned Pot 4 position.

2025 FIFA Club World Cup Group A draw
Draw position	Team	Association	Pot	Confederation	Method of qualification	Date of qualification	Appearance	Last appearance	Previous best performance
A1	Palmeiras	Brazil	1	CONMEBOL	Winners of the 2021 Copa Libertadores	March 14, 2023 (Note: Qualification was confirmed on this date by FIFA.)	3rd	2021	Runners-up (2021)
A2	Porto	Portugal	2	UEFA	UEFA four-year ranking (5th among eligible)	December 17, 2023	1st	—N/a	—N/a
A3	Al Ahly	Egypt	3	CAF	Winners of the 2020–21 CAF Champions League	March 14, 2023	10th	2023	Third place (2020, 2021, 2023)
A4	Inter Miami CF	United States	4	CONCACAF	Winners of the 2024 MLS Supporters' Shield	October 19, 2024	1st	—N/a	—N/a

== Standings ==
Pos	Team	Pld	W	D	L	GF	GA	GD	Pts	Qualification
1	(Brazil) Palmeiras	3	1	2	0	4	2	+2	5 (Note: Tied on head-to-head result (Inter Miami CF 2–2 Palmeiras). Overall goal difference was used as the tiebreaker.)	Advance to knockout stage
2	(United States) Inter Miami CF	3	1	2	0	4	3	+1	5	Advance to knockout stage
3	(Portugal) Porto	3	0	2	1	5	6	−1	2 (Note: Tied on head-to-head result (Porto 4–4 Al Ahly). Overall goal difference was used as the tiebreaker.)	
4	(Egypt) Al Ahly	3	0	2	1	4	6	−2	2	

Source: FIFA
Rules for classification: Group stage tiebreakers
Notes:

In the round of 16:

- The winners of Group A, Palmeiras, advanced to play the runners-up of Group B, Botafogo.
- The runners-up of Group A, Inter Miami CF, advanced to play the winners of Group B, Paris Saint-Germain.

== Matches ==
Matches took place from June 14 to 23. All times listed are local.

=== Al Ahly vs Inter Miami CF ===
June 14, 2025
8:00 pm EDT

Al Ahly (Egypt)	0–0	(United States) Inter Miami CF
	Report

Hard Rock Stadium, Miami Gardens
Attendance: 60,927
Referee: Alireza Faghani (Australia)

Al Ahly	Inter Miami CF

GK	1	(Egypt) Mohamed El Shenawy (c)
RB	30	(Egypt) Mohamed Hany
CB	15	(Morocco) Achraf Dari
CB	6	(Egypt) Yasser Ibrahim
LB	36	(Egypt) Ahmed Nabil Koka
RM	8	(Egypt) Hamdy Fathy
CM	13	(Egypt) Marwan Attia	(yellow card) 90+2'
CM	5	(Tunisia) Mohamed Ali Ben Romdhane		(substituted off) 65'
LM	7	(Egypt) Trézéguet		(substituted off) 65'
CF	9	(Palestine) Wessam Abou Ali		(substituted off) 79'
CF	22	(Egypt) Emam Ashour		(substituted off) 14'
Substitutions:
MF	25	(Egypt) Zizo		(substituted on) 14' (substituted off) 79'
MF	14	(Egypt) Hussein El Shahat		(substituted on) 65'
MF	29	(Egypt) Taher Mohamed		(substituted on) 65'
MF	19	(Egypt) Mohamed Magdy		(substituted on) 79'
FW	10	(Slovenia) Nejc Gradišar		(substituted on) 79'
Manager:
(Spain) José Riveiro

GK	19	(Argentina) Oscar Ustari
RB	17	(Jamaica) Ian Fray
CB	6	(Argentina) Tomás Avilés	(yellow card) 25'	(substituted off) 46'
CB	37	(Uruguay) Maximiliano Falcón
LB	32	(Greece) Noah Allen
RM	21	(Argentina) Tadeo Allende		(substituted off) 81'
CM	55	(Argentina) Federico Redondo	(yellow card) 31'
CM	5	(Spain) Sergio Busquets	(yellow card) 86'
LM	8	(Venezuela) Telasco Segovia		(substituted off) 72'
CF	10	(Argentina) Lionel Messi (c)
CF	9	(Uruguay) Luis Suárez	(yellow card) 90+2'
Substitutions:
DF	57	(Argentina) Marcelo Weigandt		(substituted on) 46'
MF	30	(United States) Benjamin Cremaschi		(substituted on) 72'
FW	7	(Haiti) Fafà Picault		(substituted on) 81'
Manager:
(Argentina) Javier Mascherano

Man of the Match:
Oscar Ustari (Inter Miami CF)

Assistant referees:
Anton Shchetinin (Australia)
Ashley Beecham (Australia)
Fourth official:
Szymon Marciniak (Poland)
Video assistant referee:
Carlos del Cerro Grande (Spain)
Assistant video assistant referee:
Alejandro Hernández Hernández (Spain)
Support video assistant referee:
Leodán González (Uruguay)

=== Palmeiras vs Porto ===
June 15, 2025
6:00 pm EDT

Palmeiras (Brazil)	0–0	(Portugal) Porto
	Report

MetLife Stadium, East Rutherford
Attendance: 46,275
Referee: Saíd Martínez (Honduras)

Palmeiras	Porto

GK	21	(Brazil) Weverton
CB	4	(Argentina) Agustín Giay
CB	15	(Paraguay) Gustavo Gómez (c)	(yellow card) 62'
CB	26	(Brazil) Murilo
RM	7	(Brazil) Felipe Anderson	(yellow card) 9'	(substituted off) 65'
CM	8	(Colombia) Richard Ríos		(substituted off) 87'
CM	5	(Argentina) Aníbal Moreno
LM	22	(Uruguay) Joaquín Piquerez
RF	41	(Brazil) Estêvão		(substituted off) 65'
CF	9	(Brazil) Vitor Roque		(substituted off) 77'
LF	18	(Brazil) Maurício		(substituted off) 65'
Substitutions:
FW	10	(Brazil) Paulinho		(substituted on) 65'
MF	40	(Brazil) Allan		(substituted on) 65'
MF	23	(Brazil) Raphael Veiga		(substituted on) 65'
FW	42	(Argentina) José Manuel López		(substituted on) 77'
MF	30	(Brazil) Lucas Evangelista		(substituted on) 87'
Manager:
(Portugal) Abel Ferreira			(yellow card) 63'

GK	14	(Portugal) Cláudio Ramos
CB	52	(Portugal) Martim Fernandes	(yellow card) 15'
CB	97	(Portugal) Zé Pedro
CB	5	(Spain) Iván Marcano (c)
RM	23	(Portugal) João Mário		(substituted off) 78'
CM	22	(Argentina) Alan Varela		(substituted off) 82'
CM	17	(Spain) Gabri Veiga		(substituted off) 67'
LM	74	(Portugal) Francisco Moura
RF	10	(Portugal) Fábio Vieira		(substituted off) 82'
CF	9	(Spain) Samu Aghehowa
LF	86	(Portugal) Rodrigo Mora		(substituted off) 78'
Substitutions:
FW	11	(Brazil) Pepê		(substituted on) 67'
DF	24	(Argentina) Nehuén Pérez	(yellow card) 90+1'	(substituted on) 78'
MF	6	(Canada) Stephen Eustáquio		(substituted on) 78'
MF	25	(Argentina) Tomás Pérez		(substituted on) 82'
MF	20	(Portugal) André Franco		(substituted on) 82'
Manager:
(Argentina) Martín Anselmi

Man of the Match:
Estêvão (Palmeiras)

Assistant referees:
Walter López (Honduras)
Christian Ramírez (Honduras)
Fourth official:
Omar Al Ali (United Arab Emirates)
Video assistant referee:
Tatiana Guzmán (Nicaragua)
Assistant video assistant referee:
Erick Miranda (Mexico)
Support video assistant referee:
Juan Lara (Chile)

=== Palmeiras vs Al Ahly ===
The teams had faced each other at the FIFA Club World Cup on two previous occasions, with Al Ahly winning 3–2 on penalties in 2020, and Palmeiras winning 2–0 in the 2021 edition.

At 1:29 pm EDT, in the 63rd minute, the match was interrupted due to adverse weather conditions. The match was resumed at 2:15 pm EDT.

June 19, 2025
12:00 pm EDT

Palmeiras (Brazil)	2–0	(Egypt) Al Ahly
Abou Ali 49' (o.g.); López 59'	Report

MetLife Stadium, East Rutherford
Attendance: 35,179
Referee: Anthony Taylor (England)

Palmeiras	Al Ahly

GK	21	(Brazil) Weverton
CB	4	(Argentina) Agustín Giay	(yellow card) 43'
CB	15	(Paraguay) Gustavo Gómez (c)
CB	26	(Brazil) Murilo
RM	41	(Brazil) Estêvão		(substituted off) 76'
CM	8	(Colombia) Richard Ríos	(yellow card) 90+5'
CM	5	(Argentina) Aníbal Moreno		(substituted off) 66'
LM	22	(Uruguay) Joaquín Piquerez	(yellow card) 74'
RF	23	(Brazil) Raphael Veiga	(yellow card) 39'	(substituted off) 46'
CF	9	(Brazil) Vitor Roque		(substituted off) 46'
LF	17	(Uruguay) Facundo Torres		(substituted off) 76'
Substitutions:
FW	42	(Argentina) José Manuel López		(substituted on) 46'
FW	18	(Brazil) Maurício		(substituted on) 46'
MF	32	(Uruguay) Emiliano Martínez		(substituted on) 66'
FW	10	(Brazil) Paulinho		(substituted on) 76'
DF	6	(Brazil) Vanderlan		(substituted on) 76'
Manager:
(Portugal) Abel Ferreira

GK	1	(Egypt) Mohamed El Shenawy (c)
RB	30	(Egypt) Mohamed Hany
CB	6	(Egypt) Yasser Ibrahim
CB	15	(Morocco) Achraf Dari		(substituted off) 61'
LB	54	(Morocco) Yahya Attiyat Allah	(yellow card) 45+3'	(substituted off) 87'
DM	13	(Egypt) Marwan Attia	(yellow card) 79'
CM	8	(Egypt) Hamdy Fathy	(yellow card) 42'	(substituted off) 61'
CM	5	(Tunisia) Mohamed Ali Ben Romdhane
RF	25	(Egypt) Zizo
CF	9	(Palestine) Wessam Abou Ali		(substituted off) 61'
LF	7	(Egypt) Trézéguet		(substituted off) 61'
Substitutions:
MF	19	(Egypt) Mohamed Magdy		(substituted on) 61'
MF	17	(Morocco) Achraf Bencharki		(substituted on) 61'
DF	4	(Egypt) Ahmed Ramadan		(substituted on) 61'
FW	10	(Slovenia) Nejc Gradišar		(substituted on) 61'
MF	14	(Egypt) Hussein El Shahat		(substituted on) 87'
Manager:
(Spain) José Riveiro

Man of the Match:
Estêvão (Palmeiras)

Assistant referees:
Gary Beswick (England)
Adam Nunn (England)
Fourth official:
Omar Al Ali (United Arab Emirates)
Video assistant referee:
Ivan Bebek (Croatia)
Assistant video assistant referee:
Bram Van Driessche (Belgium)
Support video assistant referee:
Bastian Dankert (Germany)

=== Inter Miami CF vs Porto ===
June 19, 2025
3:00 pm EDT

Inter Miami CF (United States)	2–1	(Portugal) Porto
Segovia 47'; Messi 54'	Report	Aghehowa 8' (pen.)

Mercedes-Benz Stadium, Atlanta
Attendance: 31,783
Referee: Cristián Garay (Chile)

Inter Miami CF	Porto

GK	19	(Argentina) Oscar Ustari
RB	57	(Argentina) Marcelo Weigandt	(substituted off) 62'
CB	17	(United States) Ian Fray	(substituted off) 79'
CB	37	(Uruguay) Maximiliano Falcón
LB	32	(Greece) Noah Allen
RM	21	(Argentina) Tadeo Allende	(substituted off) 79'
CM	30	(United States) Benjamin Cremaschi
CM	5	(Spain) Sergio Busquets
LM	8	(Venezuela) Telasco Segovia	(substituted off) 71'
CF	10	(Argentina) Lionel Messi (c)
CF	9	(Uruguay) Luis Suárez
Substitutions:
DF	6	(Argentina) Tomás Avilés	(substituted on) 62'
MF	55	(Argentina) Federico Redondo	(substituted on) 71'
FW	7	(Haiti) Fafà Picault	(substituted on) 79'
DF	18	(Spain) Jordi Alba	(substituted on) 79'
Manager:
(Argentina) Javier Mascherano

GK	14	(Portugal) Cláudio Ramos
CB	52	(Portugal) Martim Fernandes	(substituted off) 59'
CB	97	(Portugal) Zé Pedro
CB	5	(Spain) Iván Marcano (c)	(substituted off) 87'
RM	23	(Portugal) João Mário
CM	22	(Argentina) Alan Varela	(substituted off) 74'
CM	10	(Portugal) Fábio Vieira
LM	74	(Portugal) Francisco Moura	(substituted off) 87'
RF	17	(Spain) Gabri Veiga	(substituted off) 59'
CF	9	(Spain) Samu Aghehowa
LF	86	(Portugal) Rodrigo Mora
Substitutions:
MF	6	(Canada) Stephen Eustáquio	(substituted on) 59'
FW	70	(Portugal) Gonçalo Borges	(substituted on) 59'
FW	7	(Brazil) William Gomes	(substituted on) 74'
FW	27	(Turkey) Deniz Gül	(substituted on) 87'
DF	4	(Brazil) Otávio	(substituted on) 87'
Manager:
(Argentina) Martín Anselmi

Man of the Match:
Lionel Messi (Inter Miami CF)

Assistant referees:
Miguel Rocha (Chile)
José Retamal (Chile)
Fourth official:
Ilgiz Tantashev (Uzbekistan)
Video assistant referee:
Juan Lara (Chile)
Assistant video assistant referee:
Nicolás Gallo (Colombia)
Support video assistant referee:
Alejandro Hernández Hernández (Spain)

=== Inter Miami CF vs Palmeiras ===
June 23, 2025
9:00 pm EDT

Inter Miami CF (United States)	2–2	(Brazil) Palmeiras
Allende 16'; Suárez 65'	Report	Paulinho 80'; Maurício 87'

Hard Rock Stadium, Miami Gardens
Attendance: 60,914
Referee: Szymon Marciniak (Poland)

Inter Miami CF	Palmeiras

GK	19	(Argentina) Oscar Ustari
RB	57	(Argentina) Marcelo Weigandt
CB	6	(Argentina) Tomás Avilés
CB	37	(Uruguay) Maximiliano Falcón
LB	32	(Greece) Noah Allen
RM	21	(Argentina) Tadeo Allende		(substituted off) 77'
CM	55	(Argentina) Federico Redondo		(substituted off) 77'
CM	5	(Spain) Sergio Busquets
LM	8	(Venezuela) Telasco Segovia		(substituted off) 66'
CF	10	(Argentina) Lionel Messi (c)	(yellow card) 45+1'
CF	9	(Uruguay) Luis Suárez		(substituted off) 73'
Substitutions:
DF	18	(Spain) Jordi Alba		(substituted on) 66'
MF	30	(United States) Benjamin Cremaschi		(substituted on) 73'
MF	11	(Argentina) Baltasar Rodríguez		(substituted on) 77'
FW	7	(Haiti) Fafà Picault		(substituted on) 77'
Manager:
(Argentina) Javier Mascherano

GK	21	(Brazil) Weverton
RB	2	(Brazil) Marcos Rocha	(substituted off) 67'
CB	15	(Paraguay) Gustavo Gómez (c)
CB	26	(Brazil) Murilo	(substituted off) 18'
LB	22	(Uruguay) Joaquín Piquerez
CM	8	(Colombia) Richard Ríos
CM	30	(Brazil) Lucas Evangelista	(substituted off) 67'
RW	41	(Brazil) Estêvão
AM	23	(Brazil) Raphael Veiga	(substituted off) 46'
LW	17	(Uruguay) Facundo Torres	(substituted off) 55'
CF	42	(Argentina) José Manuel López
Substitutions:
DF	3	(Brazil) Bruno Fuchs	(substituted on) 18'
FW	18	(Brazil) Maurício	(substituted on) 46'
FW	10	(Brazil) Paulinho	(substituted on) 55'
FW	9	(Brazil) Vitor Roque	(substituted on) 67'
MF	40	(Brazil) Allan	(substituted on) 67'
Manager:
(Portugal) Abel Ferreira

Man of the Match:
Luis Suárez (Inter Miami CF)

Assistant referees:
Tomasz Listkiewicz (Poland)
Adam Kupsik (Poland)
Fourth official:
Michael Oliver (England)
Video assistant referee:
Tomasz Kwiatkowski (Poland)
Assistant video assistant referee:
Shaun Evans (Australia)
Support video assistant referee:
Khamis Al-Marri (Qatar)

=== Porto vs Al Ahly ===
June 23, 2025
9:00 pm EDT

Porto (Portugal)	4–4	(Egypt) Al Ahly
Mora 23'; William Gomes 50'; Aghehowa 53'; Pepê 89'	Report	Abou Ali 15', 45+2' (pen.), 51'; Ben Romdhane 64'

MetLife Stadium, East Rutherford
Attendance: 39,893
Referee: Jesús Valenzuela (Venezuela)

Porto	Al Ahly

GK	14	(Portugal) Cláudio Ramos
CB	6	(Canada) Stephen Eustáquio
CB	97	(Portugal) Zé Pedro
CB	5	(Spain) Iván Marcano (c)
RM	23	(Portugal) João Mário		(substituted off) 62'
CM	22	(Argentina) Alan Varela		(substituted off) 46'
CM	7	(Brazil) William Gomes		(substituted off) 68'
LM	74	(Portugal) Francisco Moura
RF	10	(Portugal) Fábio Vieira		(substituted off) 68'
CF	19	(Cameroon) Danny Namaso		(substituted off) 46'
LF	86	(Portugal) Rodrigo Mora
Substitutions:
FW	70	(Portugal) Gonçalo Borges		(substituted on) 46'
FW	9	(Spain) Samu Aghehowa		(substituted on) 46'
DF	52	(Portugal) Martim Fernandes		(substituted on) 62'
MF	17	(Spain) Gabri Veiga		(substituted on) 68'
FW	11	(Brazil) Pepê		(substituted on) 68'
Other disciplinary actions:
TS	—	(Portugal) Jorge Costa	(yellow card) 74'
Manager:
(Argentina) Martín Anselmi

GK	1	(Egypt) Mohamed El Shenawy (c)
RB	30	(Egypt) Mohamed Hany	(yellow card) 25'
CB	15	(Morocco) Achraf Dari	(yellow card) 68'
CB	4	(Egypt) Ahmed Ramadan	(yellow card) 54'
LB	36	(Egypt) Ahmed Nabil Koka
DM	8	(Egypt) Hamdy Fathy		(substituted off) 35'
DM	5	(Tunisia) Mohamed Ali Ben Romdhane		(substituted off) 87'
CM	25	(Egypt) Zizo
RF	14	(Egypt) Hussein El Shahat		(substituted off) 58'
CF	9	(Palestine) Wessam Abou Ali		(substituted off) 58'
LF	7	(Egypt) Trézéguet		(substituted off) 58'
Substitutions:
MF	23	(Mali) Aliou Dieng		(substituted on) 35'
FW	10	(Slovenia) Nejc Gradišar		(substituted on) 58'
MF	17	(Morocco) Achraf Bencharki	(yellow card) 60'	(substituted on) 58'
DF	3	(Egypt) Omar Kamal		(substituted on) 58'
MF	19	(Egypt) Mohamed Magdy		(substituted on) 87'
Manager:
(Spain) José Riveiro

Man of the Match:
Wessam Abou Ali (Al Ahly)

Assistant referees:
Jorge Urrego (Venezuela)
Tulio Moreno (Venezuela)
Fourth official:
Omar Al Ali (United Arab Emirates)
Video assistant referee:
Juan Soto (Venezuela)
Assistant video assistant referee:
Leodán González (Uruguay)
Support video assistant referee:
Alejandro Hernández Hernández (Spain)

== Discipline ==
Fair play points would have been used as tiebreakers if the overall and head-to-head records of teams were tied. These were calculated based on yellow and red cards received in all group matches as follows:

- first yellow card: −1 point;
- indirect red card (second yellow card): −3 points;
- direct red card: −4 points;
- yellow card and direct red card: −5 points;

Only one of the above deductions was applied to a player in a single match.

Team	Match 1				Match 2				Match 3				Points
Team	Booked	(yellow card) (yellow-red card)	Sent off (straight red)	(yellow card) (red card)	Booked	(yellow card) (yellow-red card)	Sent off (straight red)	(yellow card) (red card)	Booked	(yellow card) (yellow-red card)	Sent off (straight red)	(yellow card) (red card)	Points
(Portugal) Porto	2								1				−3
(United States) Inter Miami CF	4								1				−5
(Brazil) Palmeiras	3				4								−7
(Egypt) Al Ahly	1				3				4				−8
