= 2026–27 FC Porto season =

FC Porto
2026–27 season
- President: André Villas-Boas
- Head coach: Francesco Farioli
- Stadium: Estádio do Dragão
- Primeira Liga: 1st
- Taça de Portugal: Fifth round
- Taça da Liga: Semi-finals
- Supertaça Cândido de Oliveira: Winners
- UEFA Champions League: League phase
- Top goalscorer: League: Borja Sainz (6); All: Gabri Veiga (7)
Home colours	Away colours	Third colours
- All statistics correct as of 20 November 2026.

The 2026–27 season is the 134th season in the history of FC Porto, and the club's 92nd consecutive season in the top flight of Portuguese football. In addition to the domestic league, Porto is competing in the Taça de Portugal, the Taça da Liga, the Supertaça Cândido de Oliveira and the UEFA Champions League.

== Squad ==
=== Players ===
As of 30 September 2026

Note: Flags indicate national team as defined under FIFA eligibility rules; some limited exceptions apply. Players may hold more than one non-FIFA nationality.

No.	Pos.	Nation	Player
4	DF	POL	Jakub Kiwior
5	DF	POL	Jan Bednarek
6	DF	ENG	Chris Smalling
7	MF	BRA	William Gomes
8	MF	DEN	Victor Froholdt
9	FW	ESP	Samu Aghehowa
10	MF	ESP	Gabri Veiga
11	FW	BRA	Pepê
12	DF	NGR	Zaidu Sanusi
13	MF	DOM	Pablo Rosario
14	GK	POR	Cláudio Ramos
15	MF	POR	Vasco Sousa
16	MF	KOR	Hwang In-beom
17	FW	ESP	Borja Sainz
18	DF	ARG	Nehuén Pérez

No.	Pos.	Nation	Player
19	FW	POR	André Silva
20	DF	POR	Alberto Costa
21	DF	CRO	Dominik Prpić
22	MF	ARG	Alan Varela (vice-captain)
24	GK	POR	João Costa
29	FW	MEX	Santiago Giménez
33	DF	BRA	Souza
37	FW	BRA	Gabriel Mec
42	MF	CIV	Seko Fofana
50	GK	POR	João Afonso (also B team)
52	DF	POR	Martim Fernandes
74	DF	POR	Francisco Moura
77	FW	POL	Oskar Pietuszewski
99	GK	POR	Diogo Costa (captain)

=== Technical staff ===
Position	Staff
Head coach	(Italy) Francesco Farioli
Assistant coach(es)	(Netherlands) Dave Vos (Argentina) Lucho González (Portugal) Lino Godinho (Portugal) André Castro (Spain) Felipe Sánchez
Goalkeeper coach(es)	(Portugal) Diogo Almeida (Netherlands) Erik Heijblok
Fitness coach(es)	(England) Callum Walsh
Analyst(s)	(Turkey) Osman Kul
Team doctor	(Portugal) Nélson Puga
Nurses	(Portugal) José Macedo (Portugal) José Mário Almeida
Recovery specialist(s)	(Portugal) Telmo Sousa (Portugal) Manuel Vitor
Physiotherapist(s)	(Portugal) Álvaro Magalhães (Portugal) Joca (Portugal) José Ribeiro (Portugal) Nuno Vicente (Portugal) Rúben Silva

Last updated: 1 August 2026
Source: FC Porto

== Transfers ==
=== In ===
Pos.	Player	Transferred from	Fee	Date	Source
GK	(Portugal) João Afonso	(Portugal) Santa Clara	€1,500,000	25 May 2026	
FW	(Portugal) André Silva	Free agent		12 June 2026	
MF	(South Korea) Hwang In-beom	(Netherlands) Feyenoord	€4,500,000	20 July 2026	
MF	(Ivory Coast) Seko Fofana	(France) Rennes	Loan	26 August 2026	
FW	(Mexico) Santiago Giménez	(Italy) Milan	Loan	31 August 2026	
DF	(Brazil) Souza	(England) Tottenham	Loan	31 August 2026	
FW	(Brazil) Gabriel Mec	(Brazil) Grêmio	€11,000,000	2 September 2026	
DF	(England) Chris Smalling	Free agent		30 September 2026	

=== Out ===
Pos.	Player	Transferred to	Fee	Date	Source
FW	(Cameroon) Danny Namaso	(France) Auxerre	€5,000,000	17 May 2026	
FW	(Spain) Ángel Alarcón	(Netherlands) Utrecht	€2,000,000	19 May 2026	
DF	(Brazil) Thiago Silva	Free agent	End of contract	21 May 2026	
FW	(Netherlands) Luuk de Jong	Free agent	End of contract	22 May 2026	
FW	(Nigeria) Terem Moffi	(France) Nice	End of loan	28 May 2026	
MF	(Ivory Coast) Seko Fofana	(France) Rennes	End of loan	29 May 2026	
GK	(Brazil) Samuel Portugal	(Portugal) Gil Vicente	Undisclosed	11 August 2026	
MF	(Portugal) Rodrigo Mora	(Italy) Roma	€25,000,000 (50% rights)	19 August 2026	
FW	(Spain) Iván Jaime	(Spain) Las Palmas	Loan	20 August 2026	
MF	(Canada) Stephen Eustáquio	(Wales) Swansea	€4,000,000	27 August 2026	
FW	(Turkey) Deniz Gül	(Turkey) Galatasaray	€10,000,000	1 September 2026	

== Pre-season ==
The pre-season began on 1 July 2026 and included a training camp at St George's Park National Football Centre in England, between 13 and 18 July.

Win Draw Loss

11 July 2026 Friendly	Porto	1–1	(Scotland) Hibernian	Olival, Vila Nova de Gaia, Portugal
19:00 WEST (UTC+1)	Sainz		Passlack	Stadium: CTFD Jorge Costa

18 July 2026 Friendly	Porto	2–1	(England) Birmingham City	Burton upon Trent, Staffordshire, England
12:00 WEST (UTC+1)	A. Silva 38'; Pepê 82' (pen.)		Priske 8'	Stadium: St George's Park National Football Centre

22 July 2026 Friendly	Gil Vicente	1–0	Porto	Barcelos, Portugal
20:30 WEST (UTC+1)	Tchaptchet 90'			Stadium: Estádio Cidade de Barcelos; Attendance: 8,805

25 July 2026 Presentation	Porto	2–1	(England) Aston Villa	Porto, Portugal
20:00 WEST (UTC+1)	William 5'; Pepê 41'		Lynch 12'	Stadium: Estádio do Dragão; Attendance: 47,098

== Competitions ==
=== Overall record ===
Competition	First match	Last match	Starting round	Final position	Record							
Competition	First match	Last match	Starting round	Final position	Pld	W	D	L	GF	GA	GD	Win %
Primeira Liga	9 August 2026	16 May 2027	Matchday 1		11	11	0	0	27	5	+22	100.00
Taça de Portugal	20 November 2026		Fourth round		1	0	1	0	1	1	+0	0.00
Taça da Liga	28 October 2026		Quarter-finals		1	1	0	0	1	0	+1	100.00
Supertaça Cândido de Oliveira	1 August 2026		Final	Winners	1	1	0	0	1	0	+1	100.00
UEFA Champions League	8 September 2026		League phase		4	1	0	3	6	7	−1	25.00
Total					18	14	1	3	36	13	+23	77.78

Last updated: 20 November 2026
Source: Soccerway

=== Primeira Liga ===
==== League table ====
Pos	Team	Pld	W	D	L	GF	GA	GD	Pts	Qualification or relegation
1	Porto	11	11	0	0	27	5	+22	33	Qualification for the Champions League league phase
2	Benfica	11	9	1	1	30	10	+20	28	Qualification for the Champions League league phase
3	Sporting CP	11	7	3	1	24	11	+13	24	Qualification for the Champions League third qualifying round
4	Santa Clara	11	6	3	2	16	8	+8	21	Qualification for the Europa League second qualifying round (Note: The 2026–27 Taça de Portugal winners qualify for the Europa League league phase (or the fourth-placed team of the Primeira Liga if the Taça de Portugal winners finish in the top three). If the Taça de Portugal winners finish in the top four of the Primeira Liga, the Europa League second qualifying round spot will be passed to the fifth-placed team. If the Taça de Portugal winners finish in the top five of the Primeira Liga, the Conference League spot will be passed to the sixth-placed team.)
5	Arouca	11	6	2	3	13	8	+5	20	Qualification for the Conference League second qualifying round

Updated to match(es) played on 8 November 2026. Source: Liga Portugal
Rules for classification: 1) Points; 2) Head-to-head points; 3) Head-to-head goal difference; 4) Goal difference; 5) Matches won; 6) Goals scored; 7) Play-off.

==== Results summary ====
Overall								Home						Away					
Pld	W	D	L	GF	GA	GD	Pts	W	D	L	GF	GA	GD	W	D	L	GF	GA	GD
11	11	0	0	27	5	+22	33	5	0	0	13	2	+11	6	0	0	14	3	+11

Source: Liga Portugal

==== Results by round ====
Round	1	2	3	4	5	6	7	8	9	10	11	12	13	14	15	16	17	18	19	20	21	22	23	24	25	26	27	28	29	30	31	32	33	34
Ground	H	A	H	A	H	A	H	A	A	H	A	H	A	H	A	H	A	A	H	A	H	A	H	A	H	H	A	H	A	H	A	H	A	H
Result	W	W	W	W	W	W	W	W	W	W	W																							
Position	1	2	1	1	1	1	1	1	1	1	1	1																						

Source: Liga Portugal
A = Away; H = Home; W = Win; D = Draw; L = Loss

==== Matches ====
9 August 2026 1	Porto	2–0	Alverca	Porto
18:00 WEST (UTC+01:00)	Silva 9' (pen.); Veiga 44' (pen.)	Report		Stadium: Estádio do Dragão; Attendance: 47,558; Referee: Luís Godinho

15 August 2026 2	Rio Ave	0–2	Porto	Vila do Conde
20:30 WEST (UTC+01:00)		Report	Pérez 11'; Sainz 82'	Stadium: Estádio dos Arcos; Attendance: 4,583; Referee: Miguel Fonseca

23 August 2026 3	Porto	2–0	Arouca	Porto
20:30 WEST (UTC+01:00)	Veiga 67'; Sainz 86'	Report		Stadium: Estádio do Dragão; Attendance: 46,825; Referee: João Pinheiro

29 August 2026 4	Académico de Viseu	0–3	Porto	Viseu
18:00 WEST (UTC+01:00)		Report	Silva 5'; Veiga 20'; Gomes 38'	Stadium: Estádio do Fontelo; Attendance: 6,746; Referee: Miguel Nogueira

6 September 2026 5	Porto	2–1	Moreirense	Porto
21:15 WEST (UTC+01:00)	Bednarek 37'; Gomes 58'	Report	Pinto 20'	Stadium: Estádio do Dragão; Attendance: 46,318; Referee: António Nobre

13 September 2026 6	Casa Pia	1–4	Porto	Rio Maior
19:00 WEST (UTC+01:00)	Araújo 43' (pen.)	Report	Silva 45+3'; Kiwior 60'; Sainz 66'; Giménez 90+2' (pen.)	Stadium: Estádio Municipal de Rio Maior; Attendance: 4,110; Referee: José Bessa

20 September 2026 7	Porto	3–1	Benfica	Porto
20:30 WEST (UTC+01:00)	Veiga 31'; Froholdt 54'; Hwang 60'	Report	Bah 51'	Stadium: Estádio do Dragão; Attendance: 49,560; Referee: Miguel Nogueira

10 October 2026 8	Marítimo	1–2	Porto	Funchal
18:00 WEST (UTC+01:00)	Szalai 16'	Report	Froholdt 42'; Pietuszewski 84'	Stadium: Estádio do Marítimo; Attendance: 10,014; Referee: João Gonçalves

24 October 2026 9	Gil Vicente	0–1	Porto	Barcelos
20:30 WET (UTC±00:00)		Report	Sainz 64'	Stadium: Estádio Cidade de Barcelos; Attendance: 10,520; Referee: Luís Godinho

31 October 2026 10	Porto	4–0	Estoril	Porto
20:30 WET (UTC±00:00)	Froholdt 4'; Sainz 64'; Silva 70'; Veiga 73'	Report		Stadium: Estádio do Dragão; Attendance: 43,134; Referee: Miguel Nogueira

8 November 2026 11	Vitória de Guimarães	1–2	Porto	Guimarães
18:00 WET (UTC±00:00)	Alanzinho 77'	Report	Sainz 38'; Fernandes 86'	Stadium: Estádio D. Afonso Henriques; Referee: David Rafael Silva

29 November 2026 12	Porto	v	Sporting CP	Porto
20:30 WET (UTC±00:00)		Report		Stadium: Estádio do Dragão

6 December 2026 13	Santa Clara	v	Porto	Ponta Delgada
--:-- AZOT (UTC-01:00)		Report		Stadium: Estádio de São Miguel

20 December 2026 14	Porto	v	Estrela da Amadora	Porto
--:-- WET (UTC±00:00)		Report		Stadium: Estádio do Dragão

20 December 2026 15	Famalicão	v	Porto	Vila Nova de Famalicão
--:-- WET (UTC±00:00)		Report		Stadium: Estádio Municipal 22 de Junho

27 December 2026 16	Porto	v	Nacional	Porto
--:-- WET (UTC±00:00)		Report		Stadium: Estádio do Dragão

10 January 2027 17	Braga	v	Porto	Braga
--:-- WET (UTC±00:00)		Report		Stadium: Estádio Municipal de Braga

17 January 2027 18	Alverca	v	Porto	Alverca do Ribatejo
--:-- WET (UTC±00:00)		Report		Stadium: Complexo Desportivo FC Alverca

24 January 2027 19	Porto	v	Rio Ave	Porto
--:-- WET (UTC±00:00)		Report		Stadium: Estádio do Dragão

31 January 2027 20	Arouca	v	Porto	Arouca
--:-- WET (UTC±00:00)		Report		Stadium: Estádio Municipal de Arouca

7 February 2027 21	Porto	v	Académico de Viseu	Porto
--:-- WET (UTC±00:00)		Report		Stadium: Estádio do Dragão

14 February 2027 22	Moreirense	v	Porto	Moreira de Cónegos
--:-- WET (UTC±00:00)		Report		Stadium: Parque Moreira de Cónegos

21 February 2027 23	Porto	v	Casa Pia	Porto
--:-- WET (UTC±00:00)		Report		Stadium: Estádio do Dragão

28 February 2027 24	Benfica	v	Porto	Lisbon
--:-- WET (UTC±00:00)		Report		Stadium: Estádio da Luz

7 March 2027 25	Porto	v	Marítimo	Porto
--:-- WET (UTC±00:00)		Report		Stadium: Estádio do Dragão

14 March 2027 26	Porto	v	Gil Vicente	Porto
--:-- WET (UTC±00:00)		Report		Stadium: Estádio do Dragão

21 March 2027 27	Estoril	v	Porto	Estoril
--:-- WET (UTC±00:00)		Report		Stadium: Estádio António Coimbra da Mota

4 April 2027 28	Porto	v	Vitória de Guimarães	Porto
--:-- WEST (UTC+01:00)		Report		Stadium: Estádio do Dragão

11 April 2027 29	Sporting CP	v	Porto	Lisbon
--:-- WEST (UTC+01:00)		Report		Stadium: Estádio José Alvalade

18 April 2027 30	Porto	v	Santa Clara	Porto
--:-- WEST (UTC+01:00)		Report		Stadium: Estádio do Dragão

25 April 2027 31	Estrela da Amadora	v	Porto	Amadora
--:-- WEST (UTC+01:00)		Report		Stadium: Estádio José Gomes

2 May 2027 32	Porto	v	Famalicão	Porto
--:-- WEST (UTC+01:00)		Report		Stadium: Estádio do Dragão

9 May 2027 33	Nacional	v	Porto	Funchal
--:-- WEST (UTC+01:00)		Report		Stadium: Estádio da Madeira

16 May 2027 34	Porto	v	Braga	Porto
--:-- WET (UTC±00:00)		Report		Stadium: Estádio do Dragão

=== Taça de Portugal ===
20 November 2026 Fourth round	Porto	1–1 (a.e.t.) (3–1 p)	Paredes	Porto
20:45 WET (UTC±0)	Fofana 40'	Report	Moura 57' (o.g.)	Stadium: Estádio do Dragão; Referee: Anzhony Rodrigues
	Penalties
	Giménez (penalty scored); Pietuszewski (penalty missed); Bednarek (penalty scored); Froholdt (penalty scored)		Duarte (penalty scored); Fernandes (penalty missed); Veiga (penalty missed); Ruca (penalty missed)

=== Taça da Liga ===
28 October 2026 Quarter-finals	Porto	1–0	Académico de Viseu	Porto
20:30 WET (UTC±0)	Giménez 45'	Report		Stadium: Estádio do Dragão; Attendance: 39,151; Referee: Sérgio Guelho

5 January 2027 Semi-finals	Porto	v	Benfica	Leiria
20:15 WET (UTC±0)		Report		Stadium: Estádio Dr. Magalhães Pessoa

=== Supertaça Cândido de Oliveira ===
1 August 2026	Porto	1–0	Torreense	Coimbra
20:15 WEST (UTC+1)	Froholdt 38'	Report		Stadium: Estádio Cidade de Coimbra; Attendance: 26,426; Referee: André Narciso

=== UEFA Champions League ===
==== League phase ====
===== League table =====
Pos	Team	Pld	W	D	L	GF	GA	GD	Pts	Qualification
24	(Netherlands) PSV Eindhoven	4	1	1	2	3	4	−1	4	Advance to knockout phase play-offs (unseeded)
25	(Norway) Bodø/Glimt	4	1	1	2	4	9	−5	4	
26	(Portugal) Porto	4	1	0	3	6	7	−1	3	
27	(Italy) Napoli	4	1	0	3	6	11	−5	3	
28	(Spain) Villarreal	4	1	0	3	8	14	−6	3	

Updated to match(es) played on 4 November 2026. Source: UEFA
Rules for classification: League phase tiebreakers

===== Results by round =====
Round	1	2	3	4	5	6	7	8
Ground	H	A	H	H	A	A	H	A
Result	L	L	L	W				
Position	31	30	34	26				

Updated to match(es) played on 4 November 2026. Source: UEFA
A = Away; H = Home; W = Win; D = Draw; L = Loss

===== Matches =====
8 September 2026 1	Porto (Portugal)	0–2	(England) Manchester City	Porto, Portugal
21:00 WEST (UTC+1)		Report	Haaland 47', 90+1'	Stadium: Estádio do Dragão; Attendance: 49,106; Referee: Szymon Marciniak (Poland)

14 October 2026 2	Real Betis (Spain)	3–2	(Portugal) Porto	Seville, Spain
21:00 CEST (UTC+2)	Ezzalzouli 47'; Hernández 74'; Isco 84' (pen.)	Report	Veiga 54'; Aghehowa 61'	Stadium: Estadio de La Cartuja; Attendance: 67,114; Referee: Clément Turpin (France)

20 October 2026 3	Porto (Portugal)	0–1	(Netherlands) PSV Eindhoven	Porto, Portugal
21:00 WEST (UTC+1)		Report	Til 57'	Stadium: Estádio do Dragão; Attendance: 48,935; Referee: Daniel Siebert (Germany)

4 November 2026 4	Porto (Portugal)	4–1	(Italy) Napoli	Porto, Portugal
21:00 WET (UTC+0)	Bednarek 11'; Veiga 71'; Kiwior 80'; Samu 90' (pen.)	Report	McTominay 43'	Stadium: Estádio do Dragão; Attendance: 49,190; Referee: Michael Oliver (England)

24 November 2026 5	Feyenoord (Netherlands)	v	(Portugal) Porto	Rotterdam, Netherlands
21:00 CET (UTC+1)		Report		Stadium: De Kuip

9 December 2026 6	Liverpool (England)	v	(Portugal) Porto	Liverpool, England
21:00 WET (UTC+0)		Report		Stadium: Anfield

19 January 2027 7	Porto (Portugal)	v	(Czech Republic) Slavia Prague	Porto, Portugal
21:00 WET (UTC+0)		Report		Stadium: Estádio do Dragão

27 January 2027 8	LASK (Austria)	v	(Portugal) Porto	Linz, Austria
21:00 CET (UTC+1)		Report		Stadium: Raiffeisen Arena

== Statistics ==
Updated as of match played against Paredes (Taça de Portugal, fourth round) on 20 November 2026.

=== Appearances and goals ===
No.	Pos	Nat	Player	Total		Primeira Liga		Taça de Portugal		Taça da Liga		Supertaça		Champions League	
No.	Pos	Nat	Player	Apps	Goals	Apps	Goals	Apps	Goals	Apps	Goals	Apps	Goals	Apps	Goals
Goalkeepers
14	GK	(Portugal) POR	Cláudio Ramos	2	0	0	0	1	0	1	0	0	0	0	0
24	GK	(Portugal) POR	João Costa	0	0	0	0	0	0	0	0	0	0	0	0
50	GK	(Portugal) POR	João Afonso	0	0	0	0	0	0	0	0	0	0	0	0
99	GK	(Portugal) POR	Diogo Costa	16	0	11	0	0	0	0	0	1	0	4	0
Defenders
4	DF	(Poland) POL	Jakub Kiwior	16	2	11	1	0	0	0	0	1	0	4	1
5	DF	(Poland) POL	Jan Bednarek	16	2	11	1	0+1	0	0+1	0	1	0	2	1
6	DF	(England) ENG	Chris Smalling	1	0	0	0	0	0	1	0	0	0	0	0
12	DF	(Nigeria) NGR	Zaidu Sanusi	11	0	7	0	0	0	0+1	0	1	0	1+1	0
18	DF	(Argentina) ARG	Nehuén Pérez	10	1	1+6	1	1	0	1	0	0	0	1	0
20	DF	(Portugal) POR	Alberto Costa	15	0	9+1	0	0	0	0	0	1	0	3+1	0
21	DF	(Croatia) CRO	Dominik Prpić	2	0	0+1	0	0	0	1	0	0	0	0	0
33	DF	(Brazil) BRA	Souza	4	0	0+1	0	1	0	1	0	0	0	0+1	0
52	DF	(Portugal) POR	Martim Fernandes	12	1	2+4	1	1	0	1	0	0+1	0	3	0
74	DF	(Portugal) POR	Francisco Moura	7	0	3+1	0	1	0	0	0	0	0	1+1	0
Midfielders
7	MF	(Brazil) BRA	William Gomes	10	2	8	2	0	0	0	0	1	0	1	0
8	MF	(Denmark) DEN	Victor Froholdt	16	4	10	3	0+1	0	0+1	0	1	1	3	0
10	MF	(Spain) ESP	Gabri Veiga	17	7	10+1	5	1	0	0	0	1	0	4	2
13	MF	(Dominican Republic) DOM	Pablo Rosario	18	0	9+2	0	0+1	0	0+1	0	1	0	4	0
16	MF	(South Korea) KOR	Hwang In-beom	16	1	2+7	1	0+1	0	1	0	0+1	0	0+4	0
22	MF	(Argentina) ARG	Alan Varela	12	0	2+5	0	1	0	1	0	0+1	0	2	0
42	MF	(Ivory Coast) CIV	Seko Fofana	8	1	0+3	0	1	1	1	0	0	0	0+3	0
Forwards
9	FW	(Spain) ESP	Samu Aghehowa	8	2	2+3	0	0	0	0	0	0	0	1+2	2
11	FW	(Brazil) BRA	Pepê	18	0	11	0	1	0	0+1	0	1	0	4	0
17	FW	(Spain) ESP	Borja Sainz	17	6	3+8	6	1	0	0	0	0+1	0	2+2	0
19	FW	(Portugal) POR	André Silva	17	4	8+3	4	1	0	0	0	1	0	3+1	0
29	FW	(Mexico) MEX	Santiago Giménez	9	2	0+4	1	0+1	0	1	1	0	0	0+3	0
37	FW	(Brazil) BRA	Gabriel Mec	2	0	0+1	0	0	0	1	0	0	0	0	0
77	FW	(Poland) POL	Oskar Pietuszewski	5	1	0+2	1	0+1	0	0	0	0	0	1+1	0
Players who made an appearance and/or had a squad number but left the team.
6	MF	(Canada) CAN	Stephen Eustáquio	1	0	0+1	0	0	0	0	0	0	0	0	0
86	MF	(Portugal) POR	Rodrigo Mora	1	0	0+1	0	0	0	0	0	0	0	0	0
27	FW	(Turkey) TUR	Deniz Gül	4	0	1+2	0	0	0	0	0	0+1	0	0	0

=== Disciplinary record ===
No.	Pos	Nat	Player	Total			Primeira Liga			Taça de Portugal			Taça da Liga			Supertaça			Champions League		
No.	Pos	Nat	Player	Yellow card	Second yellow card	Red card	Yellow card	Second yellow card	Red card	Yellow card	Second yellow card	Red card	Yellow card	Second yellow card	Red card	Yellow card	Second yellow card	Red card	Yellow card	Second yellow card	Red card
Goalkeepers
14	GK	(Portugal) POR	Cláudio Ramos	0	0	0	0	0	0	0	0	0	0	0	0	0	0	0	0	0	0
24	GK	(Portugal) POR	João Costa	0	0	0	0	0	0	0	0	0	0	0	0	0	0	0	0	0	0
50	GK	(Portugal) POR	João Afonso	0	0	0	0	0	0	0	0	0	0	0	0	0	0	0	0	0	0
99	GK	(Portugal) POR	Diogo Costa	0	0	0	0	0	0	0	0	0	0	0	0	0	0	0	0	0	0
Defenders
4	DF	(Poland) POL	Jakub Kiwior	2	0	0	1	0	0	0	0	0	0	0	0	1	0	0	0	0	0
5	DF	(Poland) POL	Jan Bednarek	2	0	0	1	0	0	1	0	0	0	0	0	0	0	0	0	0	0
6	DF	(England) ENG	Chris Smalling	1	0	0	0	0	0	0	0	0	1	0	0	0	0	0	0	0	0
12	DF	(Nigeria) NGR	Zaidu Sanusi	0	0	0	0	0	0	0	0	0	0	0	0	0	0	0	0	0	0
18	DF	(Argentina) ARG	Nehuén Pérez	1	0	0	0	0	0	1	0	0	0	0	0	0	0	0	0	0	0
20	DF	(Portugal) POR	Alberto Costa	0	0	0	0	0	0	0	0	0	0	0	0	0	0	0	0	0	0
21	DF	(Croatia) CRO	Dominik Prpić	0	0	0	0	0	0	0	0	0	0	0	0	0	0	0	0	0	0
33	DF	(Brazil) BRA	Souza	0	0	0	0	0	0	0	0	0	0	0	0	0	0	0	0	0	0
52	DF	(Portugal) POR	Martim Fernandes	0	0	0	0	0	0	0	0	0	0	0	0	0	0	0	0	0	0
74	DF	(Portugal) POR	Francisco Moura	1	0	0	1	0	0	0	0	0	0	0	0	0	0	0	0	0	0
Midfielders
7	MF	(Brazil) BRA	William Gomes	1	0	0	0	0	0	0	0	0	0	0	0	1	0	0	0	0	0
8	MF	(Denmark) DEN	Victor Froholdt	0	0	0	0	0	0	0	0	0	0	0	0	0	0	0	0	0	0
10	MF	(Spain) ESP	Gabri Veiga	2	0	0	1	0	0	0	0	0	0	0	0	0	0	0	1	0	0
13	MF	(Dominican Republic) DOM	Pablo Rosario	5	0	0	2	0	0	1	0	0	0	0	0	1	0	0	1	0	0
16	MF	(South Korea) KOR	Hwang In-beom	3	0	0	3	0	0	0	0	0	0	0	0	0	0	0	0	0	0
22	MF	(Argentina) ARG	Alan Varela	3	0	0	2	0	0	0	0	0	0	0	0	0	0	0	1	0	0
42	MF	(Ivory Coast) CIV	Seko Fofana	1	0	0	0	0	0	1	0	0	0	0	0	0	0	0	0	0	0
Forwards
9	FW	(Spain) ESP	Samu Aghehowa	0	0	0	0	0	0	0	0	0	0	0	0	0	0	0	0	0	0
11	FW	(Brazil) BRA	Pepê	1	0	0	1	0	0	0	0	0	0	0	0	0	0	0	0	0	0
17	FW	(Spain) ESP	Borja Sainz	1	0	0	1	0	0	0	0	0	0	0	0	0	0	0	0	0	0
19	FW	(Portugal) POR	André Silva	1	0	0	0	0	0	0	0	0	0	0	0	0	0	0	1	0	0
29	FW	(Mexico) MEX	Santiago Giménez	1	0	0	0	0	0	0	0	0	0	0	0	0	0	0	1	0	0
37	FW	(Brazil) BRA	Gabriel Mec	0	0	0	0	0	0	0	0	0	0	0	0	0	0	0	0	0	0
77	FW	(Poland) POL	Oskar Pietuszewski	1	0	0	1	0	0	0	0	0	0	0	0	0	0	0	0	0	0
Players who made an appearance and/or had a squad number but left the team.
6	MF	(Canada) CAN	Stephen Eustáquio	0	0	0	0	0	0	0	0	0	0	0	0	0	0	0	0	0	0
86	MF	(Portugal) POR	Rodrigo Mora	0	0	0	0	0	0	0	0	0	0	0	0	0	0	0	0	0	0
27	FW	(Turkey) TUR	Deniz Gül	0	0	0	0	0	0	0	0	0	0	0	0	0	0	0	0	0	0

=== Own goals ===
No.	Nat.	Player	Opponent	Competition (round)
74	(Portugal) POR	Francisco Moura	Paredes	Taça de Portugal (fourth round)

=== Clean sheets ===
The following keepers have secured clean sheets (first number) per matches played (second number) in each competition:

No.	Nat.	Player	Total	Primeira Liga	Taça de Portugal	Taça da Liga	Supertaça	Champions League
99	(Portugal) POR	Diogo Costa	7 / 16	6 / 11	–	–	1 / 1	0 / 4
14	(Portugal) POR	Cláudio Ramos	1 / 2	–	0 / 1	1 / 1	–	–

== Awards ==
=== Primeira Liga ===
Monthly awards

- Diogo Costa
  - Goalkeeper of the Month (August)
- Jakub Kiwior
  - Defender of the Month (August)
- Gabri Veiga
  - Midfielder of the Month (August)
  - Player of the Month (August)
- Jan Bednarek
  - Defender of the Month (September–October)
