= 2026 Supertaça Cândido de Oliveira =

Supertaça Cândido de Oliveira Placard
- Event: Supertaça Cândido de Oliveira
| FC Porto | Torreense |
| 1 | 0 |
- Date: 1 August 2026
- Venue: Estádio Cidade de Coimbra, Coimbra
- Man of the Match: Victor Froholdt (Porto)
- Referee: André Narciso (Setúbal FA)
- Attendance: 26,426
- Weather: Clear, 21 °C (70 °F)

The 2026 Supertaça Cândido de Oliveira Placard was the 48th edition of the Supertaça Cândido de Oliveira, the Portuguese Supercup match contested between the national champions and cup winners of the previous season. It was played between the champions of the 2025–26 Primeira Liga, FC Porto and the winners of the 2025–26 Taça de Portugal, SCU Torreense at the Estádio Cidade de Coimbra on 1 August 2026.

Coimbra's first hosting of the trophy in 22 years was won by Porto 1–0 and proved controversial due to the pitch's poor playing conditions. The Dragons secured their 25th Supertaça title, and crucially, became the most titled club in Portugal on 88 titles, surpassing Benfica's total tally of 87.

== Background ==
See also: 2025-26 FC Porto season, 2026 Taça de Portugal final

FC Porto and SCU Torreense had qualified after winning the 2025-26 Primeira Liga and Taça de Portugal respectively.

After what had been considered a less than satisfactory 2024-25 season, Porto appointed Francesco Farioli as their new head coach, from Ajax. After beating Sporting away in the first Clássico of the league season on 30 August 2025 by 1-2, the dragons rose to first place where they remained until the end of the season, finishing with 28 wins, four draws and two defeats over the course of the 34-match campaign in which they also had the best defence, conceding only 18 goals - one every two games.

Torreense had started their 2025-26 season in the second division wanting to be in contention for promotion to the top flight. Vítor Martins had initially been appointed from Feirense having finished 8th and five points under the club the season prior. Despite rising as high as second, a run of poor results shortly after sacked him at the end of the calendar year. Nonetheless, he had managed to take to keep them in the Taça de Portugal as far as the quarter-finals, after beating first-tier Casa Pia in the fifth round. On 1 January 2026, Luís Tralhão was promoted to head coach of the main squad from the under-23 side. The azul-grenás beat União de Leiria at home 2-1 in the Cup quarter-final before facing third-tier Fafe in the two-leg semifinals. After a draw away, they qualified for the final with a 2-0 home win. In the cup final at Jamor, they shocked Sporting with an early goal and after conceding later on, won the match from a penalty in extra time by 2-1, becoming the first lower division team to hoist the cup. In the league, they finished third on goal difference and qualified for the two-leg promotion play-off against Casa Pia - having been scheduled midweek on either side of the cup final and ultimately lost by the club, but the dubbed "Torreense Process" had still garnered results through a major piece of silverware and qualification for european competitions.

Although it is not a particularly common fixture, it isn't one without history - Porto had previously faced a final-debutant Torreense at Jamor in 1955/56, where they beat their opponents 2-0. Their paths would memorably cross again in the unpredictable 1998/99 edition of the cup, when SCUT won a quarter-final away at Estádio das Antas by 1-0 during Carnaval week, an event of particular importance to the city of Torres Vedras. In the current squads, one player among those called up for the match, Stephen Eustáquio, has played for both senior teams.

Despite their record cup win in 2026, due to the Supercup's qualification rules, the fixture wasn't a stranger to lower division teams - before winning the 1999 cup final, Beira-Mar were relegated and faced Porto in the fixture as a second-tier side; third-division Leixões replayed the prior season's cup final when they qualified as cup finalists for the 2002 edition against Sporting; and, in 2022, Tondela also qualified the same way against Porto, also repeating the prior cup final. Neither of the three were successful in their supercup match. Porto aside success in the trophy's history was also in familiar territory in Coimbra, being present in all four previous matches played (1992, 1994, 2000 and 2004) there and having lost only on the third instance.

== Pre-match ==
=== Opening ceremony ===
The Supercup featured an opening ceremony shortly before kick-off, featuring group Karetus and an accompanying theme based on the north-eastern caretos costumes, a central inspiration for the band's audiovisual identity and part the costumes' region of origin's carnaval, as well as pyrotechnics. Singers Iolanda and Vitorino performed the national anthem at the end of the ceremony.

== Match ==
=== Details ===
1 August 2026
20:15 WEST (UTC+01:00)

| Porto | 1–0 | Torreense |
|---|---|---|
| Froholdt 38' | Report |

Estádio Cidade de Coimbra, Coimbra
Attendance: 26,426
Referee: Andre Narciso (Setúbal)

| Porto | Torreense |

| GK | 99 | (Portugal) Diogo Costa (c) |
| RB | 20 | (Portugal) Alberto Costa | | (substituted off) 83' |
| CB | 5 | (Poland) Jan Bednarek | | (substituted off) 46' |
| CB | 4 | (Poland) Jakub Kiwior | (yellow card) 90' |
| LB | 12 | (Nigeria) Zaidu Sanusi |
| CM | 13 | (Dominican Republic) Pablo Rosario | (yellow card) 60' |
| CM | 10 | (Spain) Gabri Veiga | | (substituted off) 73' |
| CM | 8 | (Denmark) Victor Froholdt |
| RW | 7 | (Brazil) William Gomes | (yellow card) 45' | (substituted off) 62' |
| LW | 11 | (Brazil) Pepê |
| CF | 19 | (Portugal) André Silva | | (substituted off) 62' |
Substitutes:
| GK | 24 | (Portugal) João Costa |
| DF | 18 | (Argentina) Nehuén Pérez |
| DF | 52 | (Portugal) Martim Fernandes | | (substituted on) 83' |
| DF | 74 | (Portugal) Francisco Moura |
| MF | 6 | (Canada) Stephen Eustáquio |
| MF | 16 | (South Korea) Hwang In-beom | | (substituted on) 73' |
| MF | 22 | (Argentina) Alan Varela | | (substituted on) 46' |
| MF | 86 | (Portugal) Rodrigo Mora |
| FW | 17 | (Spain) Borja Sainz | | (substituted on) 62' |
| FW | 27 | (Turkey) Deniz Gül | | (substituted on) 62' |
| FW | 77 | (Poland) Oskar Pietuszewski |
Manager:
(Italy) Francesco Farioli

| GK | 31 | (Brazil) Adriel |
| RB | 22 | (Portugal) David Bruno | (yellow card) 12' | (substituted off) 77' |
| CB | 5 | (Mauritania) Mohamed Ali Diadié |
| CB | 2 | (Cape Verde) Stopira (c) |
| LB | 23 | (Spain) Javi Vázquez |
| CM | 8 | (Spain) Álex Alfaro | | (substituted off) 83' |
| CM | 6 | (Brazil) Léo Azevedo |
| RM | 29 | (Colombia) Luis Quintero | (yellow card) 18' | (substituted off) 67' |
| AM | 21 | (Germany) Nuha Jatta | | (substituted off) 77' |
| LM | 7 | (Haiti) Dany Jean | (yellow card) 90' |
| CF | 17 | (Spain) Musa Drammeh | | (substituted off) 83' |
Substitutes:
| GK | 16 | (France) Lisandru Olmeta |
| DF | 3 | (Spain) Juan María Alcedo |
| DF | 28 | (Spain) Hugo Pérez |
| DF | 45 | (France) Jonathan Mutombo | | (substituted on) 77' |
| MF | 10 | (Portugal) Costinha |
| MF | 26 | (Portugal) André Simões |
| MF | 55 | (Brazil) José Breno |
| MF | 77 | (Colombia) Joel Romero | | (substituted on) 77' |
| FW | 9 | (Mali) Kévin Zohi | | (substituted on) 83' |
| FW | 19 | (Israel) Karem Zoabi | | (substituted on) 83' |
| FW | 47 | (France) Adama Baradji | | (substituted on) 67' |
Manager:
(Portugal) Luís Tralhão

Match rules
- 90 minutes.
- 30 minutes of extra time if necessary.
- Penalty shoot-out if scores still level.
- Nine named substitutes, of which up to five may be used during regular time.

== Post-match ==
Porto's 25th Supercup also translated into the 88th title, surpassing Benfica's leadership for most titled football team in Portugal. Victor Froholdt was considered the man of the match, in part for his winning goal. The inaugural awarding of the "Revelation Player" (Prémio Revelação Placard) was given to Torreense player Javi Vázquez.

== Controversies ==
=== Pedro Proença controversy ===
In the week leading up to the match, a group of audio files pertaining to conversations of the FPF president Pedro Proença were leaked online, during his time as head of Liga Portugal. Among other topics in the snippets, Proença allegedly criticises the quality of national refereeing, which was poorly received by the APAF, the Portuguese Football Referees Association, who condemned it, while asking for eventual clarifications. On the 29 July, the FPF figurehead commented on the situation criticising the "leak of 2-year old content" which was "meticulously selected, incomplete and discontextualised", also questioning the timing of the leak.

As a consequence of the situation, on the 31 July 2026, the day prior to the match, the officiating team selected for the Supercup did not perform their pre-match training and medical under boycott. Overnight, Proença and the federation travelled to their accommodation in Tomar to apologise to the referee community and therefore guarantee that the Supercup would be held the following day. After the match, Proença remarked in an interview that the conversations in question were private and proceeded to separate his beliefs as "Proença, the citizen" from "Proença, the president", affirming that these two must not be confused.

=== Playing conditions ===
Prior to the match, the playing conditions had been remarked to be poor, with several patches of grass and holes existent on the pitch. Before the match, those in charge of preparing the ground painted many of these holes green so that they wouldn't be visible and as an externality players weren't always aware of their locations. Consequently, Porto defender Jan Bednarek was subbed off in the first half with an injury resulting from the conditions. In the days immediately after the Supercup, Porto submitted a formal complaint and included a demand for compensation from the injury.

Reports prior to the match had attributed the heatwaves felt during the Summer as part of the cause, although after the match the private company in charge of pitch management attributed it to a fungus. The Portuguese federation, parallel to the clubs, also asked for clarifications from the company, seeing as it had reportedly received a positive evaluation of the pitch days before the game which did not coincide with reality.

== See also ==
- 2026–27 Primeira Liga
- 2026–27 Taça de Portugal
- 2026–27 Taça da Liga
- 2026–27 FC Porto season
