= 2025–26 FC Porto season =

FC Porto
2025–26 season
- President: André Villas-Boas
- Head coach: Francesco Farioli
- Stadium: Estádio do Dragão
- Primeira Liga: 1st
- Taça de Portugal: Semi-finals
- Taça da Liga: Quarter-finals
- UEFA Europa League: Quarter-finals
- Top goalscorer: League: Samu Aghehowa (13); All: Samu Aghehowa (20)
- Highest home attendance: 50,002 v Santa Clara; 16 May 2026 (Primeira Liga)
- Average home league attendance: 45,611
- Biggest win: 4–0 v Casa Pia (home); 24 August 2025 (Primeira Liga) v Arouca (away); 29 September 2025 (Primeira Liga) v Celoricense (away); 18 October 2025 (Taça de Portugal)
- Biggest defeat: 1–3 v Vitória de Guimarães (home); 4 December 2025 (Taça da Liga) v AVS (away); 10 May 2026 (Primeira Liga)
Home colours	Away colours	Third colours

The 2025–26 season was the 133rd season in the history of FC Porto, and the club's 91st consecutive season in the top flight of Portuguese football. In addition to the domestic league, the club competed in the Taça de Portugal, the Taça da Liga and the UEFA Europa League.

== Squad ==
=== Players ===
As of 16 May 2026

Note: Flags indicate national team as defined under FIFA eligibility rules; some limited exceptions apply. Players may hold more than one non-FIFA nationality.

No.	Pos.	Nation	Player
3	DF	BRA	Thiago Silva
4	DF	POL	Jakub Kiwior
5	DF	POL	Jan Bednarek
7	MF	BRA	William Gomes
8	MF	DEN	Victor Froholdt
9	FW	ESP	Samu Aghehowa
10	MF	ESP	Gabri Veiga
11	FW	BRA	Pepê
12	DF	NGR	Zaidu Sanusi
13	MF	DOM	Pablo Rosario
14	GK	POR	Cláudio Ramos
17	FW	ESP	Borja Sainz
18	DF	ARG	Nehuén Pérez
20	DF	POR	Alberto Costa
21	DF	CRO	Dominik Prpić
22	MF	ARG	Alan Varela (vice-captain)

No.	Pos.	Nation	Player
24	GK	POR	João Costa
26	FW	NED	Luuk de Jong
27	FW	TUR	Deniz Gül
29	FW	NGR	Terem Moffi
42	MF	CIV	Seko Fofana
45	DF	POR	João Moreira
51	GK	POR	Diogo Fernandes
52	DF	POR	Martim Fernandes
58	MF	POR	Tiago Silva
66	MF	POR	Bernardo Lima
74	DF	POR	Francisco Moura
75	FW	FRA	Yann Karamoh
77	FW	POL	Oskar Pietuszewski
86	MF	POR	Rodrigo Mora
99	GK	POR	Diogo Costa (captain)

=== Technical staff ===
Position	Staff
Head coach	(Italy) Francesco Farioli
Assistant coach(es)	(Netherlands) Dave Vos (Argentina) Lucho González (Portugal) Lino Godinho (Portugal) André Castro (Spain) Felipe Sánchez
Goalkeeper coach(es)	(Portugal) Diogo Almeida (Spain) Iñaki Ulloa
Fitness coach(es)	(England) Callum Walsh
Analyst(s)	(Turkey) Osman Kul
Team doctor	(Portugal) Nélson Puga
Nurses	(Portugal) José Macedo (Portugal) José Mário Almeida
Recovery specialist(s)	(Portugal) Telmo Sousa (Portugal) Manuel Vitor
Physiotherapist(s)	(Portugal) Álvaro Magalhães (Portugal) Joca (Portugal) José Ribeiro (Portugal) Nuno Vicente (Portugal) Rúben Silva

Last updated: 12 January 2026
Source: FC Porto

== Transfers ==
=== In ===
Pos.	Player	Transferred from	Fee	Date	Source
MF	(Spain) Gabri Veiga	(Saudi Arabia) Al-Ahli	€15,000,000	5 June 2025	
GK	(Portugal) João Costa	(Portugal) Estrela da Amadora	Undisclosed	9 July 2025	
DF	(Croatia) Dominik Prpić	(Croatia) Hajduk Split	€4,500,000	10 July 2025	
FW	(Spain) Borja Sainz	(England) Norwich City	€13,300,000	13 July 2025	
MF	(Denmark) Victor Froholdt	(Denmark) Copenhagen	€20,000,000	23 July 2025	
DF	(Portugal) Alberto Costa	(Italy) Juventus	€15,000,000	24 July 2025	
DF	(Poland) Jan Bednarek	(England) Southampton	€7,500,000	29 July 2025	
FW	(Netherlands) Luuk de Jong	Free agent	None	3 August 2025	
MF	(Dominican Republic) Pablo Rosario	(France) Nice	€3,750,000	28 August 2025	
DF	(Poland) Jakub Kiwior	(England) Arsenal	Loan (€2,000,000)	1 September 2025	
DF	(Brazil) Pedro Lima	(England) Wolverhampton Wanderers	Loan	1 September 2025	
FW	(France) Yann Karamoh	Free agent	None	18 September 2025	
DF	(Brazil) Thiago Silva	Free agent	None	20 December 2025	
FW	(Poland) Oskar Pietuszewski	(Poland) Jagiellonia Białystok	€10,000,000	7 January 2026	
FW	(Nigeria) Terem Moffi	(France) Nice	Loan	30 January 2026	
MF	(Ivory Coast) Seko Fofana	(France) Rennes	Loan	31 January 2026	
DF	(Poland) Jakub Kiwior	(England) Arsenal	€17,000,000	5 May 2026	

=== Out ===
Pos.	Player	Transferred to	Fee	Date	Source
FW	(Brazil) Wendel Silva	(Portugal) Santa Clara	€1,350,000	15 June 2025	
DF	(Portugal) Tiago Djaló	(Italy) Juventus	Loan return	1 July 2025	
MF	(Portugal) Fábio Vieira	(England) Arsenal	Loan return	1 July 2025	
DF	(Spain) Iván Marcano	Retired	End of contract	2 July 2025	
GK	(Brazil) Samuel Portugal	(Saudi Arabia) Al-Okhdood	Loan	18 July 2025	
FW	(Portugal) Gonçalo Borges	(Netherlands) Feyenoord	€11,000,000	20 July 2025	
FW	(Portugal) Francisco Conceição	(Italy) Juventus	€32,000,000	22 July 2025	
DF	(Brazil) Otávio	(France) Paris FC	€17,000,000	23 July 2025	
DF	(Portugal) João Mário	(Italy) Juventus	€12,000,000	24 July 2025	
MF	(Portugal) André Franco	(United States) Chicago Fire	Loan	13 August 2025	
FW	(Cameroon) Danny Namaso	(France) Auxerre	Loan	17 August 2025	
MF	(Spain) Iván Jaime	(Canada) CF Montréal	Loan	22 August 2025	
MF	(Portugal) Romário Baró	(Poland) Radomiak Radom	End of contract	22 August 2025	
MF	(Portugal) Vasco Sousa	(Portugal) Moreirense	Loan	1 September 2025	
DF	(Portugal) Zé Pedro	(Italy) Cagliari	€2,000,000	1 September 2025	
DF	(Portugal) Fábio Cardoso	(Spain) Sevilla	End of contract	1 September 2025	
MF	(Serbia) Marko Grujić	(Greece) AEK Athens	End of contract	1 September 2025	
MF	(Portugal) André Franco	(United States) Chicago Fire	$750,000	7 November 2025	
FW	(Spain) Ángel Alarcón	(Netherlands) Utrecht	Loan	26 January 2026	
MF	(Canada) Stephen Eustáquio	(United States) Los Angeles FC	Loan	6 February 2026	
MF	(Argentina) Tomás Pérez	(Brazil) Atlético Mineiro	Loan	19 February 2026	

== Competitions ==
=== Overall record ===
Competition	First match	Last match	Starting round	Final position	Record							
Competition	First match	Last match	Starting round	Final position	Pld	W	D	L	GF	GA	GD	Win %
Primeira Liga	11 August 2025	16 May 2026	Matchday 1	Winners	34	28	4	2	66	18	+48	82.35
Taça de Portugal	18 October 2025	22 April 2026	Third round	Semi-finals	6	4	1	1	12	2	+10	66.67
Taça da Liga	4 December 2025		Quarter-finals	Quarter-finals	1	0	0	1	1	3	−2	0.00
UEFA Europa League	25 September 2025	16 April 2026	League phase	Quarter-finals	12	7	3	2	18	10	+8	58.33
Total					53	39	8	6	97	33	+64	73.58

Source: Soccerway

=== Primeira Liga ===
==== League table ====
Pos	Team	Pld	W	D	L	GF	GA	GD	Pts	Qualification or relegation
1	Porto (C)	34	28	4	2	66	18	+48	88	Qualification for the Champions League league phase
2	Sporting CP	34	25	7	2	89	24	+65	82	Qualification for the Champions League league phase
3	Benfica	34	23	11	0	74	25	+49	80	Qualification for the Europa League second qualifying round
4	Braga	34	16	11	7	64	36	+28	59	Qualification for the Conference League second qualifying round
5	Famalicão	34	15	11	8	42	29	+13	56	

Source: Liga Portugal
Rules for classification: 1) Points; 2) Head-to-head points; 3) Head-to-head goal difference; 4) Goal difference; 5) Matches won; 6) Goals scored; 7) Play-off.
(C) Champions

==== Results summary ====
Overall								Home						Away					
Pld	W	D	L	GF	GA	GD	Pts	W	D	L	GF	GA	GD	W	D	L	GF	GA	GD
34	28	4	2	66	18	+48	88	14	3	0	33	6	+27	14	1	2	33	12	+21

Source: Liga Portugal

==== Results by round ====
Round	1	2	3	4	5	6	7	8	9	10	11	12	13	14	15	16	17	18	19	20	21	22	23	24	25	26	27	28	29	30	31	32	33	34
Ground	H	A	H	A	H	A	A	H	A	H	A	H	A	H	A	H	A	A	H	A	H	A	H	H	A	H	A	H	A	H	A	H	A	H
Result	W	W	W	W	W	W	W	D	W	W	W	W	W	W	W	W	W	W	W	L	D	W	W	W	D	W	W	D	W	W	W	W	L	W
Position	2	3	2	1	1	1	1	1	1	1	1	1	1	1	1	1	1	1	1	1	1	1	1	1	1	1	1	1	1	1	1	1	1	1

Source: Liga Portugal
A = Away; H = Home; W = Win; D = Draw; L = Loss

==== Matches ====
11 August 2025 1	Porto	3–0	Vitória de Guimarães	Porto
20:45 WEST (UTC+01:00)	Pepê 12'; Aghehowa 32', 79'	Report		Stadium: Estádio do Dragão; Attendance: 48,534; Referee: António Nobre

18 August 2025 2	Gil Vicente	0–2	Porto	Barcelos
20:15 WEST (UTC+01:00)		Report	Froholdt 20'; Pepê 47'	Stadium: Estádio Cidade de Barcelos; Attendance: 11,066; Referee: Riacrdo Baixinho

24 August 2025 3	Porto	4–0	Casa Pia	Porto
18:00 WEST (UTC+01:00)	Sainz 20', 67'; Gomes 25'; Pérez 40'	Report		Stadium: Estádio do Dragão; Attendance: 49,045; Referee: Sérgio Guelho

30 August 2025 4	Sporting CP	1–2	Porto	Lisbon
20:30 WEST (UTC+01:00)	Pérez 74' (o.g.)	Report	De Jong 61'; Gomes 64'	Stadium: Estádio José Alvalade; Attendance: 50,946; Referee: João Gonçalves

13 September 2025 5	Porto	1–0	Nacional	Porto
18:00 WEST (UTC+01:00)	Aghehowa 31' (pen.)	Report		Stadium: Estádio do Dragão; Attendance: 47,285; Referee: Luís Godinho

19 September 2025 6	Rio Ave	0–3	Porto	Vila do Conde
20:15 WEST (UTC+01:00)		Report	Rosario 4'; Aghehowa 13'; Veiga 52'	Stadium: Estádio dos Arcos; Attendance: 4,624; Referee: Anzhony Rodrigues

29 September 2025 7	Arouca	0–4	Porto	Arouca
20:30 WEST (UTC+01:00)		Report	Aghehowa 12'; Gül 51'; Moura 60'; Sanusi 85'	Stadium: Estádio Municipal de Arouca; Attendance: 4,192; Referee: Fábio Veríssimo

5 October 2025 8	Porto	0–0	Benfica	Porto
21:15 WEST (UTC+01:00)		Report		Stadium: Estádio do Dragão; Attendance: 49,520; Referee: Miguel Nogueira

27 October 2025 9	Moreirense	1–2	Porto	Moreira de Cónegos
20:15 WET (UTC±00:00)	Alan 18'	Report	Aghehowa 45+4' (pen.); Gül 88'	Stadium: Parque Moreira de Cónegos; Attendance: 5,658; Referee: João Gonçalves

2 November 2025 10	Porto	2–1	Braga	Porto
20:30 WET (UTC±00:00)	Mora 45'; Sainz 79'	Report	Gómez 51'	Stadium: Estádio do Dragão; Attendance: 48,473; Referee: Fábio Veríssimo

9 November 2025 11	Famalicão	0–1	Porto	Vila Nova de Famalicão
18:00 WET (UTC±00:00)		Report	Froholdt 36'	Stadium: Estádio Municipal 22 de Junho; Attendance: 4,906; Referee: José Bessa

30 November 2025 12	Porto	1–0	Estoril	Porto
20:30 WET (UTC±00:00)	Gomes 8'	Report		Stadium: Estádio do Dragão; Attendance: 45,092; Referee: André Narciso

7 December 2025 13	Tondela	0–2	Porto	Tondela
20:30 WET (UTC±00:00)		Report	Aghehowa 48'; Gomes 49'	Stadium: Estádio João Cardoso; Attendance: 4,133; Referee: Luís Godinho

15 December 2025 14	Porto	3–1	Estrela da Amadora	Porto
20:45 WET (UTC±00:00)	Aghehowa 17' (pen.); Moura 63'; Cabral 73' (o.g.)	Report	Marcus 60'	Stadium: Estádio do Dragão; Attendance: 31,247; Referee: Miguel Fonseca

22 December 2025 15	Alverca	0–3	Porto	Alverca do Ribatejo
18:45 WET (UTC±00:00)		Report	Sainz 29', 69'; Varela 57'	Stadium: Complexo Desportivo FC Alverca; Attendance: 5,634; Referee: João Pinheiro

29 December 2025 16	Porto	2–0	AVS	Porto
20:15 WET (UTC±00:00)	Aghehowa 48', 64' (pen.)	Report		Stadium: Estádio do Dragão; Attendance: 48,097; Referee: Bruno Costa

4 January 2026 17	Santa Clara	0–1	Porto	Ponta Delgada
17:00 AZOT (UTC-01:00)		Report	Aghehowa 50'	Stadium: Estádio de São Miguel; Attendance: 5,338; Referee: Cláudio Pereira

18 January 2026 18	Vitória de Guimarães	0–1	Porto	Guimarães
20:30 WET (UTC±00:00)		Report	Varela 85' (pen.)	Stadium: Estádio D. Afonso Henriques; Attendance: 28,526; Referee: João Gonçalves

26 January 2026 19	Porto	3–0	Gil Vicente	Porto
20:15 WET (UTC±00:00)	Aghehowa 37' (pen.); Fernandes 75'; Gomes 86'	Report		Stadium: Estádio do Dragão; Attendance: 34,273; Referee: António Nobre

2 February 2026 20	Casa Pia	2–1	Porto	Rio Maior
20:45 WET (UTC±00:00)	Larrazabal 12'; Thiago Silva 45' (o.g.)	Report	Rosario 46'	Stadium: Estádio Municipal de Rio Maior; Attendance: 3,296; Referee: Pedro Ramalho

9 February 2026 21	Porto	1–1	Sporting CP	Porto
20:45 WET (UTC±00:00)	Fofana 77'	Report	Suárez 90+10'	Stadium: Estádio do Dragão; Attendance: 49,378; Referee: Luís Godinho

15 February 2026 22	Nacional	0–1	Porto	Funchal
15:30 WET (UTC±00:00)		Report	Bednarek 60'	Stadium: Estádio da Madeira; Attendance: 4,926; Referee: José Bessa

22 February 2026 23	Porto	1–0	Rio Ave	Porto
20:30 WET (UTC±00:00)	Froholdt 22'	Report		Stadium: Estádio do Dragão; Attendance: 44,810; Referee: David Rafael Silva

27 February 2026 24	Porto	3–1	Arouca	Porto
18:45 WET (UTC±00:00)	Pietuszewski 1'; Gomes 90+1' (pen.); Moffi 90+9'	Report	Djouahra 70'	Stadium: Estádio do Dragão; Attendance: 41,090; Referee: Iancu Vasilica

8 March 2026 25	Benfica	2–2	Porto	Lisbon
18:00 WET (UTC±00:00)	Schjelderup 69'; Barreiro 88'	Report	Froholdt 10'; Pietuszewski 40'	Stadium: Estádio da Luz; Attendance: 66,366; Referee: João Pinheiro

15 March 2026 26	Porto	3–0	Moreirense	Porto
20:30 WET (UTC±00:00)	Veiga 14'; Pietuszewski 25'; Gomes 81'	Report		Stadium: Estádio do Dragão; Attendance: 44,672; Referee: Carlos Macedo

22 March 2026 27	Braga	1–2	Porto	Braga
20:30 WET (UTC±00:00)	Zalazar 54' (pen.)	Report	Gomes 69'; Fofana 80'	Stadium: Estádio Municipal de Braga; Attendance: 25,611; Referee: António Nobre

4 April 2026 28	Porto	2–2	Famalicão	Porto
20:30 WEST (UTC+01:00)	Costa 35'; Fofana 90+1'	Report	Sorriso 54'; Pinheiro 90+9'	Stadium: Estádio do Dragão; Attendance: 47,562; Referee: Sérgio Guelho

12 April 2026 29	Estoril	1–3	Porto	Estoril
20:30 WEST (UTC+01:00)	Begraoui 78'	Report	Pepê 14'; Xeka 32' (o.g.); Froholdt 72'	Stadium: Estádio António Coimbra da Mota; Attendance: 4,968; Referee: Luís Godinho

19 April 2026 30	Porto	2–0	Tondela	Porto
20:30 WEST (UTC+01:00)	Veiga 48'; Froholdt 65'	Report		Stadium: Estádio do Dragão; Attendance: 46,745; Referee: Cláudio Pereira

26 April 2026 31	Estrela da Amadora	1–2	Porto	Amadora
18:00 WEST (UTC+01:00)	Jovane 79'	Report	Gül 17' (pen.), 37'	Stadium: Estádio José Gomes; Attendance: 7,174; Referee: Hélder Carvalho

2 May 2026 32	Porto	1–0	Alverca	Porto
20:30 WEST (UTC+01:00)	Bednarek 40'	Report		Stadium: Estádio do Dragão; Attendance: 49,561; Referee: David Rafael Silva

10 May 2026 33	AVS	3–1	Porto	Vila das Aves
18:00 WEST (UTC+01:00)	Roni 23', 58'; Santos 80'	Report	Gül 53'	Stadium: Estádio do CD Aves; Attendance: 5,254; Referee: Carlos Macedo

16 May 2026 34	Porto	1–0	Santa Clara	Porto
15:30 WEST (UTC+01:00)	Lima 69' (o.g.)	Report		Stadium: Estádio do Dragão; Attendance: 50,002; Referee: João Gonçalves

=== Taça de Portugal ===
18 October 2025 Third round	Celoricense	0–4	Porto	Barcelos
18:00 WEST (UTC+1)		Report	Bednarek 9'; Aghehowa 62', 71', 73'	Stadium: Estádio Cidade de Barcelos; Referee: Carlos Macedo

22 November 2025 Fourth round	Porto	3–0	Sintrense	Porto
20:15 WET (UTC±0)	Sainz 25'; Gül 70'; Mora 80'	Report		Stadium: Estádio do Dragão; Referee: Hélder Malheiro

18 December 2025 Fifth round	Porto	4–1	Famalicão	Porto
20:45 WET (UTC±0)	Gomes 6'; Froholdt 38'; Aghehowa 80'; Pepê 89'	Report	De Haas 13'	Stadium: Estádio do Dragão; Referee: António Nobre

14 January 2026 Quarter-finals	Porto	1–0	Benfica	Porto
20:45 WET (UTC±0)	Bednarek 15'	Report		Stadium: Estádio do Dragão; Attendance: 47,374; Referee: Fábio Veríssimo

3 March 2026 Semi-finals; First leg	Sporting CP	1–0	Porto	Lisbon
20:45 WET (UTC±0)	Luis Suárez 62' (pen.)	Report		Stadium: Estádio José Alvalade; Attendance: 49,000; Referee: Cláudio Pereira

22 April 2026 Semi-finals; Second leg	Porto	0–0 (0–1 agg.)	Sporting CP	Porto
20:45 WEST (UTC+1)		Report		Stadium: Estádio do Dragão; Attendance: 47,450; Referee: Miguel Nogueira

=== Taça da Liga ===
4 December 2025 Quarter-finals	Porto	1–3	Vitória de Guimarães	Porto
20:15 WET (UTC±0)	Veiga 8'	Report	Oliveira 38' (pen.); Samu 53'; Camara 79' (pen.)	Stadium: Estádio do Dragão; Attendance: 33,875; Referee: Hélder Carvalho

=== UEFA Europa League ===
==== League phase ====
===== League table =====
Pos	Team	Pld	W	D	L	GF	GA	GD	Pts	Qualification
3	(Danish Football Association) Midtjylland	8	6	1	1	18	8	+10	19	Advance to round of 16 (seeded)
4	(Royal Spanish Football Federation) Real Betis	8	5	2	1	13	7	+6	17 (Note: Away goals scored: Real Betis 5, Porto 3.)	Advance to round of 16 (seeded)
5	(Portuguese Football Federation) Porto	8	5	2	1	13	7	+6	17	Advance to round of 16 (seeded)
6	(Portuguese Football Federation) Braga	8	5	2	1	11	5	+6	17	Advance to round of 16 (seeded)
7	(German Football Association) SC Freiburg	8	5	2	1	10	4	+6	17	Advance to round of 16 (seeded)

Source: UEFA
Rules for classification: League phase tiebreakers

===== Results by round =====
Round	1	2	3	4	5	6	7	8
Ground	A	H	A	A	H	H	A	H
Result	W	W	L	D	W	W	D	W
Position	9	6	15	14	8	8	9	5

Source: UEFA
A = Away; H = Home; W = Win; D = Draw; L = Loss

25 September 2025 1	Red Bull Salzburg (Austria)	0–1	(Portugal) Porto	Salzburg, Austria
21:00 CEST (UTC+2)		Report	Gomes 90+3'	Stadium: Red Bull Arena; Attendance: 9,993; Referee: Vasilios Fotias (Greece)

2 October 2025 2	Porto (Portugal)	2–1	(Serbia) Red Star Belgrade	Porto, Portugal
20:00 WEST (UTC+1)	Gomes 8' (pen.); Mora 89'	Report	Kostov 32'	Stadium: Estádio do Dragão; Attendance: 42,812; Referee: Harm Osmers (Germany)

23 October 2025 3	Nottingham Forest (England)	2–0	(Portugal) Porto	West Bridgford, England
20:00 BST (UTC+1)	Gibbs-White 19' (pen.); Igor Jesus 77' (pen.)	Report		Stadium: City Ground; Attendance: 29,195; Referee: Radu Petrescu (Romania)

6 November 2025 4	Utrecht (Netherlands)	1–1	(Portugal) Porto	Utrecht, Netherlands
18:45 CET (UTC+1)	Rodríguez 48'	Report	Sainz 66'	Stadium: Stadion Galgenwaard; Attendance: 23,053; Referee: John Beaton (Scotland)

27 November 2025 5	Porto (Portugal)	3–0	(France) Nice	Porto, Portugal
17:45 WET (UTC±0)	Veiga 1', 33'; Aghehowa 61' (pen.)	Report		Stadium: Estádio do Dragão; Attendance: 37,254; Referee: Matej Jug (Slovenia)

11 December 2025 6	Porto (Portugal)	2–1	(Sweden) Malmö FF	Porto, Portugal
20:00 WET (UTC±0)	Aghehowa 30', 36'	Report	Moura 90+5' (o.g.)	Stadium: Estádio do Dragão; Attendance: 33,364; Referee: Rohit Saggi (Norway)

22 January 2026 7	Viktoria Plzeň (Czech Republic)	1–1	(Portugal) Porto	Plzeň, Czech Republic
18:45 CET (UTC+1)	Červ 6'	Report	Gül 90'	Stadium: Doosan Arena; Attendance: 11,108; Referee: Andris Treimanis (Latvia)

29 January 2026 8	Porto (Portugal)	3–1	(Scotland) Rangers	Porto, Portugal
20:00 WET (UTC±0)	Mora 27'; Moura 36'; Fernandez 41' (o.g.)	Report	Gassama 6'	Stadium: Estádio do Dragão; Attendance: 38,213; Referee: Jasper Vergoote (Belgium)

==== Knockout phase ====
===== Round of 16 =====
12 March 2026 First leg	Stuttgart (Germany)	1–2	(Portugal) Porto	Stuttgart, Germany
18:45 CET (UTC+1)	Undav 40'	Report	Moffi 21'; Mora 27'	Stadium: MHPArena; Attendance: 60,000; Referee: Donatas Rumšas (Lithuania)

19 March 2026 Second leg	Porto (Portugal)	2–0 (4–1 agg.)	(Germany) Stuttgart	Porto, Portugal
20:00 WET (UTC±0)	Gomes 21'; Froholdt 72'	Report		Stadium: Estádio do Dragão; Attendance: 40,675; Referee: Anthony Taylor (England)

===== Quarter-finals =====
9 April 2026 First leg	Porto (Portugal)	1–1	(England) Nottingham Forest	Porto, Portugal
20:00 WET (UTC±0)	Gomes 11'	Report	Fernandes 13' (o.g.)	Stadium: Estádio do Dragão; Attendance: 46,479; Referee: Marco Guida (Italy)

16 April 2026 Second leg	Nottingham Forest (England)	1–0 (2–1 agg.)	(Portugal) Porto	West Bridgford, England
20:00 BST (UTC+1)	Gibbs-White 12'	Report		Stadium: City Ground; Attendance: 29,560; Referee: Danny Makkelie (Netherlands)

== Statistics ==
=== Appearances and goals ===
No.	Pos	Nat	Player	Total		Primeira Liga		Taça de Portugal		Taça da Liga		Europa League	
No.	Pos	Nat	Player	Apps	Goals	Apps	Goals	Apps	Goals	Apps	Goals	Apps	Goals
Goalkeepers
14	GK	(Portugal) POR	Cláudio Ramos	5	0	1+1	0	2	0	1	0	0	0
24	GK	(Portugal) POR	João Costa	1	0	0+1	0	0	0	0	0	0	0
51	GK	(Portugal) POR	Diogo Fernandes	0	0	0	0	0	0	0	0	0	0
99	GK	(Portugal) POR	Diogo Costa	49	0	33	0	4	0	0	0	12	0
Defenders
3	DF	(Brazil) BRA	Thiago Silva	14	0	6+2	0	2	0	0	0	4	0
4	DF	(Poland) POL	Jakub Kiwior	42	0	26	0	3+2	0	0	0	9+2	0
5	DF	(Poland) POL	Jan Bednarek	49	4	31+1	2	5	2	0	0	11+1	0
12	DF	(Nigeria) NGR	Zaidu Sanusi	26	1	11+6	1	0	0	1	0	7+1	0
18	DF	(Argentina) ARG	Nehuén Pérez	6	1	4+2	1	0	0	0	0	0	0
20	DF	(Portugal) POR	Alberto Costa	47	1	25+4	1	3+3	0	0+1	0	7+4	0
21	DF	(Croatia) CRO	Dominik Prpić	12	0	1+5	0	2+1	0	1	0	2	0
45	DF	(Portugal) POR	João Moreira	0	0	0	0	0	0	0	0	0	0
52	DF	(Portugal) POR	Martim Fernandes	33	1	12+8	1	3	0	1	0	5+4	0
74	DF	(Portugal) POR	Francisco Moura	32	3	16+5	2	4	0	0	0	4+3	1
Midfielders
7	MF	(Brazil) BRA	William Gomes	46	13	9+19	8	3+3	1	0+1	0	7+4	4
8	MF	(Denmark) DEN	Victor Froholdt	51	8	32+2	6	4+1	1	0	0	6+6	1
10	MF	(Spain) ESP	Gabri Veiga	48	6	20+11	3	5+1	0	1	1	5+5	2
13	MF	(Dominican Republic) DOM	Pablo Rosario	40	2	12+10	2	5	0	1	0	11+1	0
22	MF	(Argentina) ARG	Alan Varela	45	2	27+3	2	3+2	0	1	0	4+5	0
42	MF	(Ivory Coast) CIV	Seko Fofana	18	3	1+11	3	1+1	0	0	0	4	0
58	MF	(Portugal) POR	Tiago Silva	1	0	0+1	0	0	0	0	0	0	0
66	MF	(Portugal) POR	Bernardo Lima	1	0	0+1	0	0	0	0	0	0	0
86	MF	(Portugal) POR	Rodrigo Mora	44	5	14+14	1	1+5	1	0+1	0	6+3	3
Forwards
9	FW	(Spain) ESP	Samu Aghehowa	32	20	19+1	13	2+2	4	0+1	0	6+1	3
11	FW	(Brazil) BRA	Pepê	48	4	30	3	5+1	1	0+1	0	6+5	0
17	FW	(Spain) ESP	Borja Sainz	47	7	18+12	5	3+1	1	1	0	9+3	1
26	FW	(Netherlands) NED	Luuk de Jong	7	1	2+3	1	0+1	0	0	0	0+1	0
27	FW	(Turkey) TUR	Deniz Gül	43	7	12+17	5	2+2	1	0	0	3+7	1
29	FW	(Nigeria) NGR	Terem Moffi	15	2	1+8	1	1+1	0	0	0	4	1
75	FW	(France) FRA	Yann Karamoh	2	0	0+1	0	0	0	1	0	0	0
77	FW	(Poland) POL	Oskar Pietuszewski	18	3	11+5	3	1+1	0	0	0	0	0
Players who made an appearance and/or had a squad number but left the team.
3	DF	(Portugal) POR	Zé Pedro	2	0	0+2	0	0	0	0	0	0	0
6	MF	(Canada) CAN	Stephen Eustáquio	16	0	0+8	0	1+2	0	1	0	2+2	0
15	MF	(Portugal) POR	Vasco Sousa	0	0	0	0	0	0	0	0	0	0
16	MF	(Serbia) SRB	Marko Grujić	0	0	0	0	0	0	0	0	0	0
25	MF	(Argentina) ARG	Tomás Pérez	0	0	0	0	0	0	0	0	0	0
47	FW	(Spain) ESP	Ángel Alarcón	7	0	0+3	0	1	0	1	0	1+1	0

== Awards ==
=== Primeira Liga ===
Monthly awards

- Victor Froholdt
  - Midfielder of the Month (August)
  - Midfielder of the Month (April)
  - Young Player of the Month (August)
  - Player of the Month (August)
- Francesco Farioli
  - Manager of the Month (August)
  - Manager of the Month (December)
  - Manager of the Month (April)
- William Gomes
  - Goal of the Month (August, vs. Sporting CP)
- Jan Bednarek
  - Defender of the Month (September/October)
  - Defender of the Month (November)
  - Defender of the Month (December)
  - Defender of the Month (February)
  - Defender of the Month (April)
- Diogo Costa
  - Goalkeeper of the Month (December)
  - Goalkeeper of the Month (April)

Season awards

- Victor Froholdt
  - Young Player of the Season
  - Player of the Season
- Francesco Farioli
  - Manager of the Season
- Team of the Season:
  - Goalkeeper: Diogo Costa
  - Defender: Jakub Kiwior
  - Defender: Jan Bednarek
  - Defender: Alberto Costa
  - Midfielder: Victor Froholdt
