= Borja Sainz =

Spanish footballer (born 2001)

Personal information
- Full name: Borja Sainz Eguskiza
- Date of birth: 21 February 2001 (age 25)
- Place of birth: Leioa, Spain
- Height: 1.78 m (5 ft 10 in)
- Position: Left winger

Team information
- Current team: Porto
- Number: 17

Youth career
- –2012: Lagun Artea
- 2012–2017: Athletic Bilbao
- 2017–2018: Alavés

Senior career*
Years	Team	Apps	(Gls)
2018–2020	Alavés B	24	(6)
2019–2022	Alavés	40	(2)
2021–2022	→ Zaragoza (loan)	32	(3)
2022–2023	Giresunspor	32	(9)
2023–2025	Norwich City	74	(24)
2025–	Porto	40	(10)

International career
2019–2020	Spain U19	5	(3)
- * Club domestic league appearances and goals as of 20:23, 4 November 2026 (UTC)

Borja Sainz Eguskiza (born 21 February 2001) is a Spanish professional footballer who plays as a left winger for Primeira Liga club Porto.

== Club career ==
=== Alavés ===
Born in Leioa, Biscay, Basque Country, Spain, Sainz joined Athletic Bilbao's Lezama in 2012, from lowly locals Lagun Artea. In August 2017, he signed for Alavés after refusing a contract renewal from the Lions.

On 2 September 2018, Sainz made his senior debut with the reserves at the age of just 17, playing the last three minutes in a 3–0 Tercera División home win against San Pedro. He scored his first senior goal on 7 October in a 2–0 home defeat of Beasain, and finished the campaign with five goals in 18 appearances.

Sainz made his first team – and La Liga – debut on 25 August 2019, coming on as a second-half substitute for Luis Rioja in a 0–0 home draw against Espanyol; by doing so, he became the first player born in the 21st century to appear for the senior side. He scored his first goal in the senior category on 18 June of the following year, netting the opener in a 2–0 away win against Real Sociedad.

On 5 August 2021, Sainz was loaned to Segunda División side Real Zaragoza for the season.

=== Giresunspor ===
On 28 July 2022, Sainz moved abroad for the first time in his career after signing for Giresunspor in Turkey.

=== Norwich City ===
On 30 June 2023, Sainz signed for Championship club Norwich City on a three-year contract following his departure from Giresunspor. Sainz scored on his debut for Norwich in an EFL Cup tie against Fulham on 27 September 2023. Sainz also scored for Norwich in an FA Cup tie against Liverpool on 28 January 2024.

Following a strong start to the 2024–25 season, scoring four goals in three matches, including a hat-trick against Derby County, he was named EFL Championship Player of the Month for September 2024. He won the award for a second consecutive month following a further four goals and two assists. Sainz scored his second hat-trick of the season on 26 November with three goals against Plymouth Argyle at Carrow Road. Following an incident in a fixture against Sunderland on 21 December 2024, Sainz was charged by the Football Association in January 2025 of "spitting at an opponent", subsequently receiving a six-match ban and being fined £12,000. At the EFL awards for the 2024‍–‍25 season, Sainz was named in the EFL team of the season.

=== Porto ===
On 13 July 2025, Sainz joined Primeira Liga side Porto on a five-year contract, for a reported transfer fee of £14.25m. He made his debut for the club on 11 August, starting in a 3–0 league win over Vitória de Guimarães at the Estádio do Dragão. Two weeks later, he netted a brace in a 4–0 home victory against Casa Pia. On 25 September 2025, Sainz made his continental debut, starting in a 1–0 win away at Red Bull Salzburg, in the league phase of the UEFA Europa League.

== Career statistics ==
As of match played 31 October 2026

Appearances and goals by club, season and competition
Club	Season	League			National cup (Note: Includes Copa del Rey, Turkish Cup, FA Cup, Taça de Portugal)		League cup (Note: Includes EFL Cup, Taça da Liga)		Continental		Other		Total	
Club	Season	Division	Apps	Goals	Apps	Goals	Apps	Goals	Apps	Goals	Apps	Goals	Apps	Goals
Alavés B	2018–19	Tercera División	18	5	—		—		—		4 (Note: Appearances in Tercera División promotion play-offs)	0	22	5
Alavés B	2019–20	Segunda División B	6	1	—		—		—		—		6	1
Alavés B	Total		24	6	0	0	—		—		4	0	28	6
Alavés	2019–20	La Liga	19	1	1	0	—		—		—		20	1
Alavés	2020–21	La Liga	21	1	3	0	—		—		—		24	1
Alavés	Total		40	2	4	0	—		—		—		44	2
Real Zaragoza	2021–22	Segunda División	32	3	3	0	—		—		—		35	3
Giresunspor	2022–23	Süper Lig	32	9	2	1	—		—		—		34	10
Norwich City	2023–24	Championship	33	6	3	1	1	1	—		2 (Note: Appearances in Championship play-offs)	0	39	8
Norwich City	2024–25	Championship	41	18	0	0	2	1	—		—		43	19
Norwich City	Total		74	24	3	1	3	2	—		2	0	82	27
Porto	2025–26	Primeira Liga	30	5	4	1	1	0	12 (Note: Appearances in UEFA Europa League)	1	—		47	7
Porto	2026–27	Primeira Liga	10	5	0	0	0	0	3 (Note: Appearances in UEFA Champions League)	0	1 (Note: Appearance in Supertaça Cândido de Oliveira)	0	14	5
Porto	Total		40	10	4	1	1	0	15	1	1	0	61	12
Career total			242	54	16	3	4	2	15	1	7	0	284	60

== Honours ==
Porto

- Primeira Liga: 2025–26
- Supertaça Cândido de Oliveira: 2026

Individual

- EFL Championship Player of the Month: September 2024, October 2024
- EFL Championship Team of the Season: 2024–25
- PFA Team of the Year: 2024–25 Championship
- Primeira Liga Goal of the Month: December 2025
