= João Costa (footballer, born 1996) =

Portuguese footballer

Personal information
- Full name: João Paulo Santos da Costa
- Date of birth: 2 February 1996 (age 30)
- Place of birth: Barcelos, Portugal
- Height: 1.85 m (6 ft 1 in)
- Position: Goalkeeper

Team information
- Current team: Porto
- Number: 24

Youth career
- 2004–2006: Núcleo Andorinhas
- 2006–2015: Porto

Senior career*
Years	Team	Apps	(Gls)
2015–2017	Porto B	23	(1)
2016–2019	Porto	0	(0)
2018	→ Gil Vicente (loan)	13	(0)
2018–2019	→ Cartagena (loan)	29	(0)
2019–2020	Mirandés	1	(0)
2020–2021	Granada B	27	(0)
2021–2022	Granada	0	(0)
2022–2023	Murcia	21	(0)
2023–2025	Feirense	29	(0)
2025	Estrela Amadora	14	(0)
2025–	Porto	1	(0)
2025–	Porto B	10	(0)

International career
2011	Portugal U15	2	(0)
2011–2012	Portugal U16	9	(0)
2012–2013	Portugal U17	15	(1)
2013	Portugal U18	2	(0)
2014	Portugal U19	1	(0)
2016	Portugal U20	3	(0)
- * Club domestic league appearances and goals as of 16:30, 16 May 2026 (UTC)

João Paulo Santos da Costa (born 2 February 1996), sometimes known as Andorinha, is a Portuguese professional footballer who plays as a goalkeeper for Primeira Liga club Porto.

== Club career ==
Born in Barcelos, Braga District, Costa joined Porto's youth system at the age of 10. On 3 October 2015, he made his debut as a senior with the reserves, in a 2–0 away win against Olhanense in the LigaPro. He added a further six appearances during the season, as they achieved the feat of being the first B team to win the championship.

On 11 September 2016, in the 94th minute of the league fixture against Penafiel, Costa scored to help the hosts to earn one point after the 2–2 draw. On 29 November, he remained on the bench for the first team during a 0–0 home draw with Belenenses in the group stage of the Taça da Liga.

Costa went on to serve two loans subsequently, his first being with Gil Vicente still in the second tier. Afterwards, he joined Spanish Segunda División B club Cartagena.

On 14 August 2019, Costa signed a permanent one-year deal with Mirandés, newly promoted to Segunda División. He played two extra-time away wins in the Copa del Rey, and his sole league appearance was a 4–0 loss at Racing de Santander on 17 September. Following the arrival of Raúl Lizoain, he left on 27 January 2020 and moved to Recreativo Granada on an 18-month deal.

Initially a part of the first team for the 2021 pre-season, Costa spent the 2021–22 campaign unregistered by both the main and reserve squads as he was already 25. In August 2022, he joined Real Murcia of Primera Federación.

Costa returned to Portugal on 16 August 2023, on a contract at second-tier club Feirense. In January 2025, he signed a three-and-a-half-year deal with Estrela da Amadora. His Primeira Liga bow took place on 9 February, in the 1–0 defeat away to Casa Pia.

On 9 July 2025, Costa returned to Porto by agreeing to a contract until June 2030. The following 16 May, by playing 20 minutes of a 1–0 home victory over Santa Clara in place of Diogo Costa in the last matchday, he managed to not only make his competitive debut at age 30 but also become eligible for a league winners medal.

== Career statistics ==
As of match played 16 May 2026

Appearances and goals by club, season and competition
Club	Season	League			National cup (Note: Includes Copa del Rey and Taça de Portugal)		Other		Total	
Club	Season	Division	Apps	Goals	Apps	Goals	Apps	Goals	Apps	Goals
Porto B	2015–16	LigaPro	7	0	—		—		7	0
Porto B	2016–17	LigaPro	16	1	—		—		16	1
Porto B	Total		23	1	0	0	0	0	23	1
Gil Vicente (loan)	2017–18	LigaPro	13	0	0	0	—		13	0
Cartagena (loan)	2018–19	Segunda División B	29	0	2	0	4 (Note: Appearances in Segunda División B play-offs)	0	35	0
Mirandés	2019–20	Segunda División	1	0	2	0	—		3	0
Granada B	2019–20	Segunda División B	6	0	—		—		6	0
Granada B	2020–21	Segunda División B	21	0	—		—		21	0
Granada B	Total		27	0	0	0	0	0	27	0
Granada	2021–22	La Liga	0	0	0	0	—		0	0
Murcia	2022–23	Primera Federación	21	0	0	0	—		21	0
Feirense	2023–24	Liga Portugal 2	11	0	1	0	2 (Note: Appearances in Liga Portugal 2 relegation play-offs)	0	14	0
Feirense	2024–25	Liga Portugal 2	18	0	0	0	—		18	0
Feirense	Total		29	0	1	0	2	0	32	0
Estrela Amadora	2024–25	Primeira Liga	14	0	0	0	0	0	14	0
Porto	2025–26	Primeira Liga	1	0	0	0	0	0	1	0
Porto B	2025–26	Liga Portugal 2	10	0	—		—		10	0
Career total			168	1	5	0	6	0	179	1

== Honours ==
Porto B

- Segunda Liga: 2015–16

Porto

- Primeira Liga: 2025–26
- Supertaça Cândido de Oliveira: 2026
