= Samu Aghehowa =

Spanish footballer (born 2004)

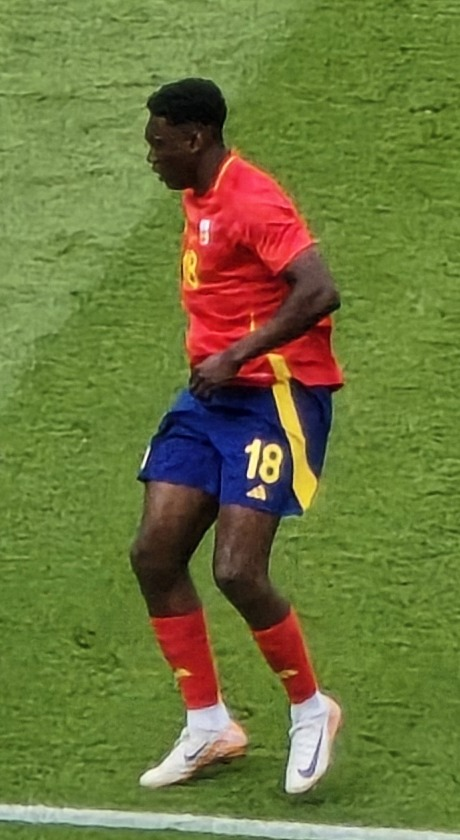
- Aghehowa playing for Spain U23 in the 2024 Summer Olympics

Personal information
- Full name: Samuel Omorodion Aghehowa
- Date of birth: 5 May 2004 (age 22)
- Place of birth: Melilla, Spain
- Height: 1.93 m (6 ft 4 in)
- Position: Forward

Team information
- Current team: Porto
- Number: 9

Youth career
- Sevilla
- 2015–2021: Nervión
- 2021–2022: Granada

Senior career*
Years	Team	Apps	(Gls)
2022–2023	Granada B	32	(14)
2022–2023	Granada	1	(1)
2023–2024	Atlético Madrid	0	(0)
2023–2024	→ Alavés (loan)	34	(8)
2024–	Porto	55	(32)

International career^{‡}
2022–2023	Spain U19	5	(1)
2023–	Spain U21	11	(6)
2024–	Spain U23	4	(1)
2024–	Spain	4	(0)
Medal record
Men's football
Representing Spain
UEFA Nations League
Runner-up	2025 Germany	Team
Olympic Games
Gold medal – first place	2024 Paris	Team
- * Club domestic league appearances and goals as of 23:57, 8 November 2026 (UTC) ‡ National team caps and goals as of 23:33, 18 November 2025 (UTC)

Samuel "Samu" Omorodion Aghehowa (born 5 May 2004) is a Spanish professional footballer who plays as a forward for Primeira Liga club Porto and the Spain national team.

After coming through Granada's youth academy, Aghehowa began playing for the club's reserve team in 2022, being promoted to the first team in 2023. He subsequently signed with Atlético Madrid, being immediately loaned to La Liga club Alavés. In August 2024, Aghehowa joined Porto for a transfer fee of €15 million.

Eligible to play for Nigeria, Aghehowa represented Spain at various youth international levels. He won a gold medal with the Spain under-23 team at the 2024 Summer Olympics. He then made his senior international debut in 2024.

== Club career ==
=== Granada ===
Samu Aghehowa was born in Melilla to Nigerian parents. The parents of Samu Aghehowa arrived as refugees in the North African Spanish enclave. Aghehowa moved to Seville at a young age. After playing for local side AD Nervión in his hometown of Sevilla, he joined Granada's youth setup in 2021.

On 6 March 2022, Aghehowa made his senior debut for Granada's reserve team, Recreativo Granada, coming on as a second-half substitute in a 2–1 league home loss to Marchamalo. On 25 September, he scored his first senior goal, netting the B's equalizer in a 1–1 draw against El Ejido.

On 20 April 2023, Aghehowa renewed his contract with the Nazaríes until 2028. Having scored 18 goals for Granada's B team throughout the 2022–23 season, helping the B team reach the Segunda Federación promotion play-offs.

Aghehowa made his first-team debut on 14 August 2023, starting and scoring in a 3–1 away loss against Atlético Madrid.

=== Atlético Madrid ===
On 21 August, Aghehowa joined fellow top-tier side Atlético Madrid on a permanent deal, signing a five-year contract with the club, with Atlético triggering his €6 million release clause.

Five days later, he was sent to Deportivo Alavés, also in the Spanish first division, on loan until the end of the season. In the 2023–24 season, he became the top scorer for his club in La Liga by scoring 8 goals, out of 9 in total having scored a goal with Granada.

In July 2024, Chelsea negotiated with Atlético for the transfer of Aghehowa, offering a bid worth €40 million (£34 million), plus add-ons, but Atlético initially turned it down. He agreed personal terms with Chelsea, and both clubs agreed on a deal, but issues surrounding an ankle injury during the medical examination and image rights negotiations led to the transfer collapsing in early August. Shortly thereafter, he was excluded from first-team training, with Atlético arranging a permanent transfer for him. Aghehowa later described the experience as a "very complicated summer".

=== Porto ===
On 24 August 2024, Aghehowa joined Primeira Liga club Porto from Atlético Madrid on a five-year contract and reported €100 million release clause. Porto paid Atlético Madrid €15 million for 50% of his rights and also reserved the option to buy 15% of his rights in 2025 and 2026 for €5 million each year.

He made his competitive debut for his new club in the to rivals 2–0 loss to Sporting CP in the Primeira Liga on 31 August, and scored his first goal on 15 September, netting the winner in a 2–1 win against Farense. In his next league match, on 21 September, Aghehowa scored a brace in a 3–0 victory over Vitória de Guimarães at Estádio D. Afonso Henriques. Four days later, he made his debut in European competitions, starting and scoring in a 3–2 loss away at Bodø/Glimt, during the inaugural matchday of the newly formatted UEFA Europa League league stage; followed by two goals in a 3–3 home draw with Manchester United on 3 October at Estádio do Dragão. On 28 October, he scored a hat-trick in a 5–0 victory away against AVS in the Primeira Liga.

On 10 November, Aghehowa scored the lone goal for Porto in a 4–1 away defeat to rivals Benfica in O Clássico. This marked Porto's heaviest league loss to their arch-rivals in 60 years, a result not seen since a 4–0 defeat in the 1964–65 season. After scoring five goals in five matches and helping Porto in an unbeaten streak, he was named the league's Player of the Month and Forward of the Month. His performances throughout the season led to Aghehowa achieving his most prolific campaign, scoring 25 goals, including 19 in the league, as Porto finished third place in the Primeira Liga.

On 5 May 2025, Porto triggered the €5 million clause to purchase a further 15% of Aghehowa's economic rights. Two months later, Porto announced that the remaining 35% of his rights had been acquired for €12 million. Totaling his cost at €32 million, Aghehowa became the most expensive signing ever made by a Portuguese club. On 9 February 2026, he sustained an ACL injury in his right knee during a match against Sporting CP, which would sideline him for the remainder of 2025–26 season.

== International career ==
Prior to receiving his first competitive cap for the Spain senior team in November 2024, Aghehowa was eligible to represent Nigeria through his parents' birthplace, but he chose to represent Spain internationally.

In April 2023, Aghehowa received his first call-up to the Spain under-19 national team. In July of the same year, he took part in the 2023 UEFA European Under-19 Championship in Malta, where the Rojita lost to eventual champions Italy in the semi-finals. He was a member of Spain's national team for the football tournament at the 2024 Summer Olympics, helping the team in their gold medal-winning run.

Aghehowa received his first senior international call-up in November 2024 for a pair of Nations League fixtures against Denmark and Switzerland. He made his debut against the latter on 18 November at the Estadio Heliodoro Rodríguez López in Santa Cruz de Tenerife, replacing Álvaro Morata at half-time, as Spain won the match 3–2.

== Style of play ==
Aghehowa has been described by The Athletic as a "modern No 9" who is "tall, quick, and physically imposing" centre-forward. He combines strength and aerial ability to create opportunities and threaten in the penalty area. His acceleration aids counterattacks, while his finishing shows promise with both feet and his head. He applies pressure effectively, disrupts opposition play, and contributes defensively with tracking and aerial support. His high work rate and direct approach enhance his impact in attack.

According to former Atlético Madrid scout Javier Vidales, Aghehowa is "more than just a strong striker who holds up play and distributes the ball". He sees Aghehowa as playing the "role of two attackers: a target man who occupies defenders and a mobile forward who finds space. If defenders close down the spaces, he acts as a traditional No.9; if they block him, he adapts to exploit openings".

== Personal life ==
Previously known as Samu Omorodion, Samu announced in September 2026 that he wanted to be known by his maternal surname, Aghehowa, to honour his mother.

== Career statistics ==
=== Club ===
As of match played 8 November 2026

Appearances and goals by club, season and competition
Club	Season	League			National cup (Note: Includes Copa del Rey, Taça de Portugal)		League cup (Note: Includes Taça da Liga)		Europe		Other		Total	
Club	Season	Division	Apps	Goals	Apps	Goals	Apps	Goals	Apps	Goals	Apps	Goals	Apps	Goals
Recreativo Granada	2021–22	Segunda División RFEF	3	0	—		—		—		—		3	0
Recreativo Granada	2022–23	Segunda Federación	29	14	—		—		—		4 (Note: Appearances in Segunda Federación play-offs)	4	33	18
Recreativo Granada	Total		32	14	—		—		—		4	4	36	18
Granada	2023–24	La Liga	1	1	—		—		—		—		1	1
Alavés (loan)	2023–24	La Liga	34	8	1	0	—		—		—		35	8
Porto	2024–25	Primeira Liga	30	19	1	0	2	0	9 (Note: Appearances in UEFA Europa League)	6	3 (Note: Appearances in FIFA Club World Cup)	2	45	27
Porto	2025–26	Primeira Liga	20	13	4	4	1	0	7	3	—		32	20
Porto	2026–27	Primeira Liga	5	0	0	0	0	0	3 (Note: Appearances in UEFA Champions League)	2	0	0	8	2
Porto	Total		55	32	5	4	3	0	19	11	3	2	85	49
Career total			122	55	6	4	3	0	19	11	7	6	157	76

=== International ===
As of match played 18 November 2025

Appearances and goals by national team and year
National team	Year	Apps	Goals
Spain	2024	1	0
Spain	2025	3	0
Total		4	0

== Honours ==
Porto

- Primeira Liga: 2025–26

Spain U23

- Summer Olympics gold medal: 2024

Spain

- UEFA Nations League runner-up: 2024–25

Individual

- La Liga Play of the Month: February 2024 (with Álex Sola)
- Primeira Liga Player of the Month: December 2024
- Primeira Liga Forward of the Month: December 2024,
