= Tiago Silva (footballer, born 2007) =

Portuguese footballer (born 2005)

Personal information
- Full name: Tiago Gonçalves da Silva
- Date of birth: 10 July 2007 (age 19)
- Place of birth: Porto, Portugal
- Height: 1.80 m (5 ft 11 in)
- Position: Midfielder

Team information
- Current team: Porto B
- Number: 58

Youth career
- 2019–2025: Porto

Senior career*
Years	Team	Apps	(Gls)
2025–	Porto B	15	(1)
2026–	Porto	1	(0)

International career^{‡}
2023	Portugal U16	2	(0)
2024–2025	Portugal U18	10	(0)
2025	Portugal U19	3	(0)
- * Club domestic league appearances and goals as of 12:27, 11 May 2026 (UTC) ‡ National team caps and goals as of 12:27, 11 May 2026 (UTC)

Tiago Gonçalves da Silva (born 10 July 2007) is a Portuguese professional footballer who plays as a midfielder for Liga Portugal 2 club Porto B.

== Club career ==
A youth product of Porto, Silva signed his first professional contract with the club on 8 October 2024 and was promoted to their reserves. On 30 March 2026, he extended his contract with Porto until 2031. He debuted with the senior Porto team as a substitute in a 3–1 Primeira Liga loss to AVS on 10 May 2026.

== International career ==
Silva is a youth international for Portugal, having played for the Portugal U18s from 2024 to 2025.
