= Oskar Pietuszewski =

Polish professional footballer (born 2008)

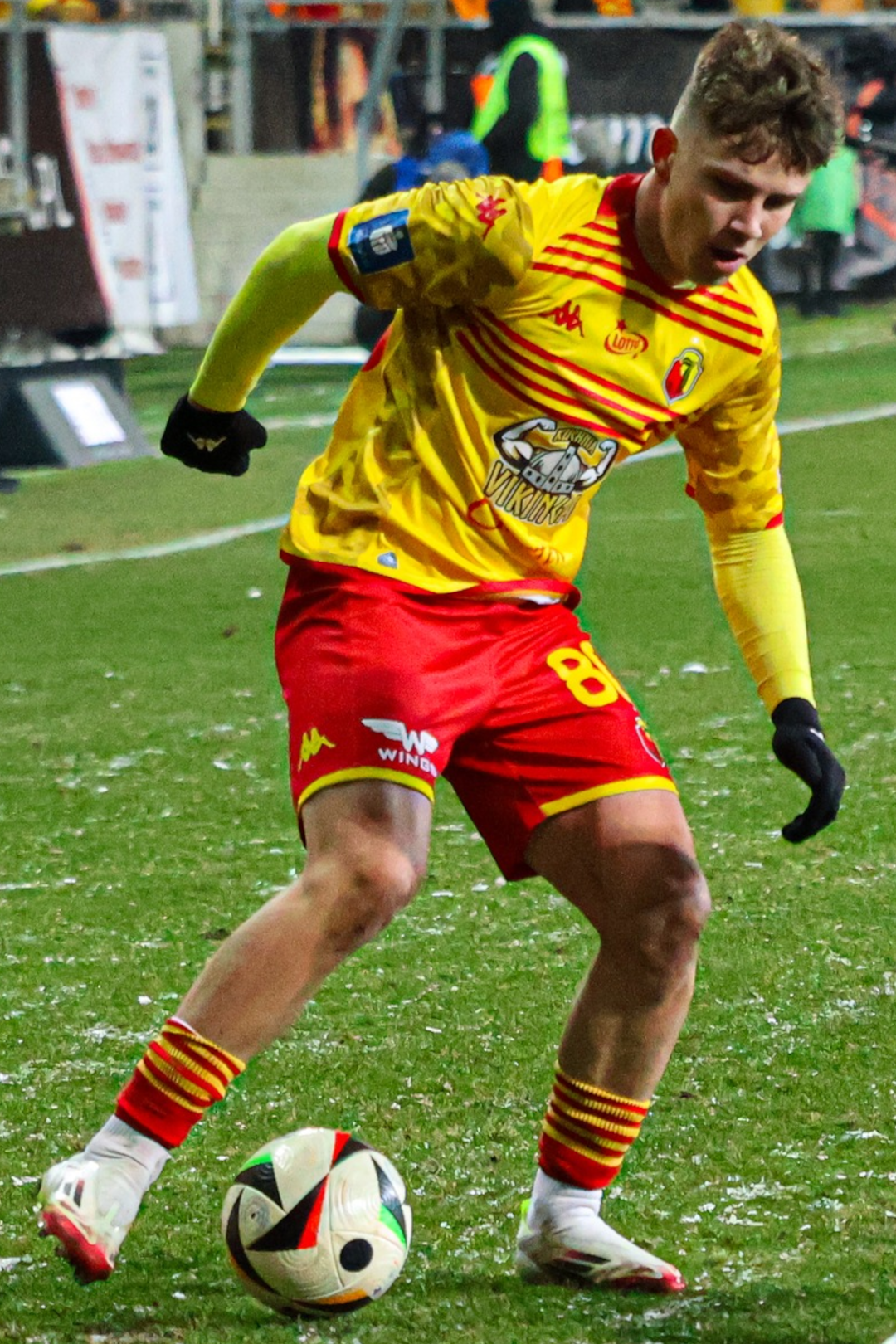
- Pietuszewski in 2025 with Jagiellonia Białystok

Personal information
- Date of birth: 20 May 2008 (age 18)
- Place of birth: Białystok, Poland
- Height: 1.79 m (5 ft 10 in)
- Position: Winger

Team information
- Current team: Porto
- Number: 77

Youth career
- 2016–2024: AP Jagiellonia Białystok

Senior career*
Years	Team	Apps	(Gls)
2024–2026	Jagiellonia Białystok	32	(4)
2025	Jagiellonia Białystok II	1	(0)
2026–	Porto	18	(4)

International career^{‡}
2022	Poland U15	3	(1)
2023–2024	Poland U17	15	(4)
2025	Poland U21	6	(4)
2026–	Poland	6	(0)
- * Club domestic league appearances and goals as of 16:07, 10 October 2026 (UTC) ‡ National team caps and goals as of 16:16, 6 October 2026 (UTC)

Oskar Pietuszewski (Polish: [pjɛtu ˈʂɛvski]; born 20 May 2008) is a Polish professional footballer who plays as a winger for Primeira Liga club Porto and the Poland national team.

== Club career ==
=== Youth career ===
Pietuszewski spent his entire youth career in Jagiellonia Białystok's academy. On 5 July 2022, he won the under-14 championship of Poland with the Podlaskie Football Association's team. On that day, Pietuszewski scored a hat-trick in a 5–2 victory against the Silesian FA's youth team. He was also the tournament's top scorer. On 23 August 2022, Pietuszewski scored a hat-trick during a 3–1 CLJ U-17 victory over Cracovia.

=== Jagiellonia Białystok ===
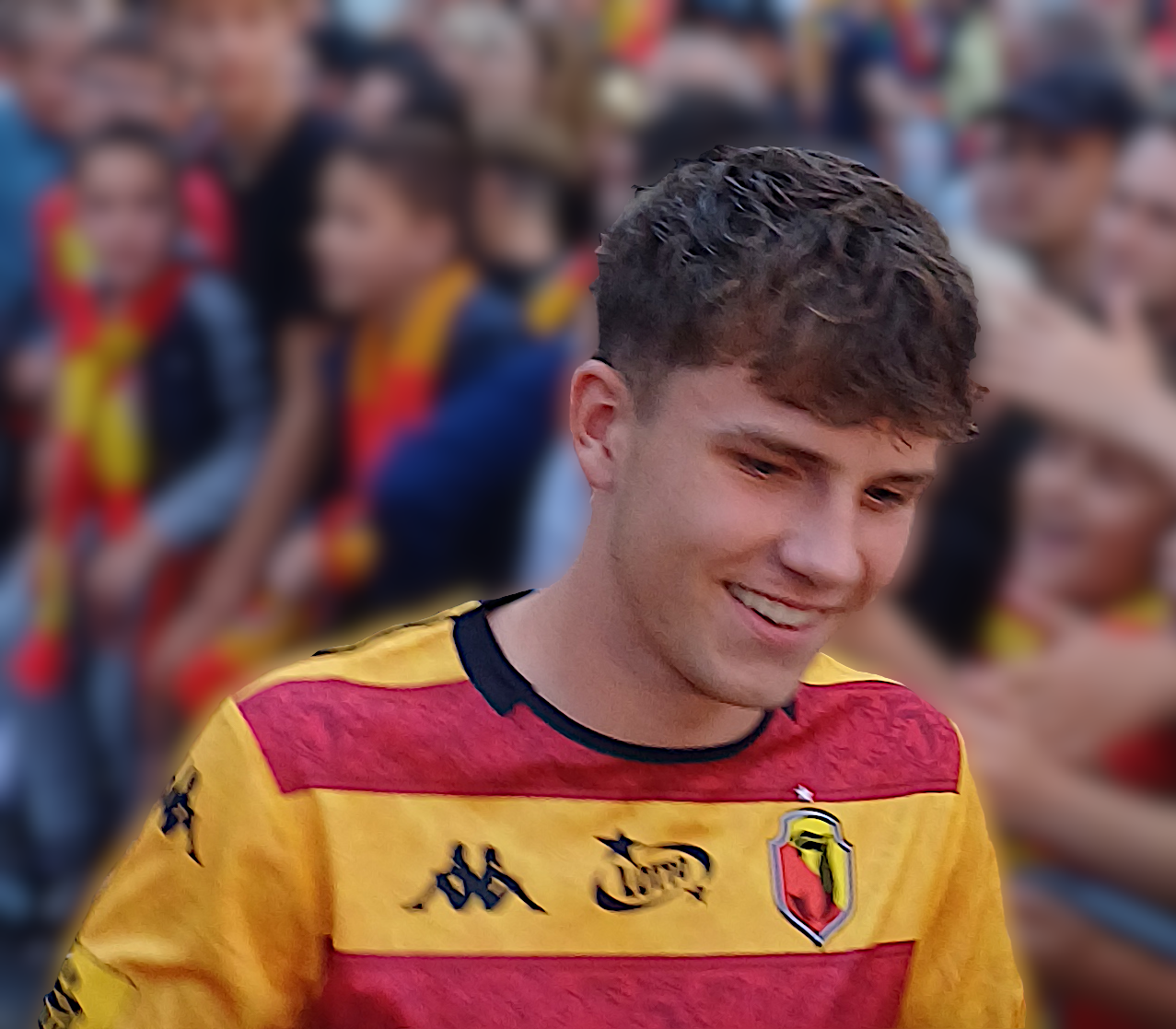
Pietuszewski with Jagiellonia Białystok in 2025 during presentation

At the age of sixteen, Pietuszewski made his debut for Jagiellonia Białystok in the UEFA Europa League play-off round, a 3–0 away loss to AFC Ajax on 29 August 2024. On 1 December 2024, Pietuszewski made his Ekstraklasa debut in a 1–1 draw against Pogoń Szczecin, he substituted Darko Churlinov in the 80th minute.

Six months later, on 4 May 2025, he scored his premiere goal for Jagiellonia during a 1–1 draw against Górnik Zabrze. This goal made him the second-youngest goalscorer in Jagiellonia's history, and the seventh-youngest goalscorer ever in the Ekstraklasa.

=== Porto ===
On 7 January 2026, Pietuszewski signed a three-year contract with Primeira Liga club Porto, where he joined fellow countrymen Jan Bednarek and Jakub Kiwior. The Portuguese side paid a reported €8 million fee, which could rise to €10 million with add-ons, and his release clause was set at €60 million. He made his debut on 18 January, coming on as a substitute and winning a penalty in a 1–0 league victory away at Vitória Guimarães.

On 27 February, Pietuszewski scored his first goal for the club in the 13th second of a 3–1 home win over Arouca. By doing so, he became the youngest ever foreigner to score for Porto, scored the fastest ever goal in Estádio do Dragão's history, and equalled Ljubinko Drulović's record for the fastest goal scored for Porto. In the 2025–26 season, Porto finished first in the Primeira Liga, ended their Taça de Portugal run in the semi-finals and were knocked out of the UEFA Europa League quarter-finals, with Pietuszewski not registered for the latter competition. On 27 May 2026, he signed a new five-year deal with Porto.

On 10 October 2026, Pietuszewski scored a goal after an assist from Jakub Kiwior securing a 2–1 victory for Porto against Marítimo. On 14 October 2026, Pietuszewski entered the pitch in the second half of the match against Real Betis (2–3), becoming the youngest Polish footballer in history to make his debut appearance in UEFA Champions League, aged 18 years, 4 months and 24 days.

== International career ==
=== Poland U15 and U17 ===
In August 2022, Pietuszewski was called-up to the Poland national under-15 team. He also featured for the Poland under-17s, where he made his debut in a 7–2 victory over Wales on 20 August 2023. He scored his first goal for Poland U17 team on 3 October, in the 27th minute of a 2–1 victory over Sweden. Overall, he played 15 matches for the team, scoring four goals.

=== Poland U21 ===
Pietuszewski made his Poland U21 debut on 5 September 2025 as a 63rd-minute substitute, and scored the final goal of a 3–0 win over North Macedonia. At the age of 17 years, three months and 16 days, he became the youngest scorer in Poland U21's history.

=== Poland ===
He was first called-up to the Poland national team in March 2026 for the 2026 FIFA World Cup qualification play-offs. He made a debut on 26 March 2026 in a 2–1 semifinal win against Albania, coming on for the second half of the match.

== Career statistics ==
=== Club ===
As of match played 20 November 2026

Appearances and goals by club, season and competition
Club	Season	League			National cup (Note: Includes Polish Cup, Taça de Portugal)		League cup		Continental		Other		Total	
Club	Season	Division	Apps	Goals	Apps	Goals	Apps	Goals	Apps	Goals	Apps	Goals	Apps	Goals
Jagiellonia Białystok II	2024–25	III liga, gr. I	1	0	—		—		—		—		1	0
Jagiellonia Białystok	2024–25	Ekstraklasa	15	1	2	0	—		5 (Note: One appearance in UEFA Europa League, four appearances in UEFA Conference League)	0	1 (Note: Appearance in Polish Super Cup)	0	23	1
Jagiellonia Białystok	2025–26	Ekstraklasa	17	3	2	0	—		12 (Note: Appearances in UEFA Conference League)	0	—		31	3
Jagiellonia Białystok	Total		32	4	4	0	—		17	0	1	0	54	4
Porto	2025–26	Primeira Liga	16	3	2	0	—		—		—		18	3
Porto	2026–27	Primeira Liga	2	1	1	0	0	0	2 (Note: Appearances in UEFA Champions League)	0	0	0	5	1
Porto	Total		18	4	3	0	0	0	2	0	0	0	23	4
Career total			51	8	7	0	0	0	19	0	1	0	78	8

=== International ===
As of match played 5 October 2026

Appearances and goals by national team and year
National team	Year	Apps	Goals
Poland
Poland	2026	6	0
Total		6	0

== Honours ==
Jagiellonia Białystok

- Polish Super Cup: 2024

Porto

- Primeira Liga: 2025–26
- Supertaça Cândido de Oliveira: 2026

Individual

- Ekstraklasa Young Player of the Month: August 2025, September 2025
