= Cláudio Ramos =

Cláudio Ramos may refer to:

- Cláudio Ramos (television presenter) (born 1973), Portuguese television presenter, social commentator and writer
- Cláudio Ramos (footballer) (born 1991), Portuguese footballer

== See also ==
- Ramos
