= Nehuén Pérez =

Argentine footballer (born 2000)

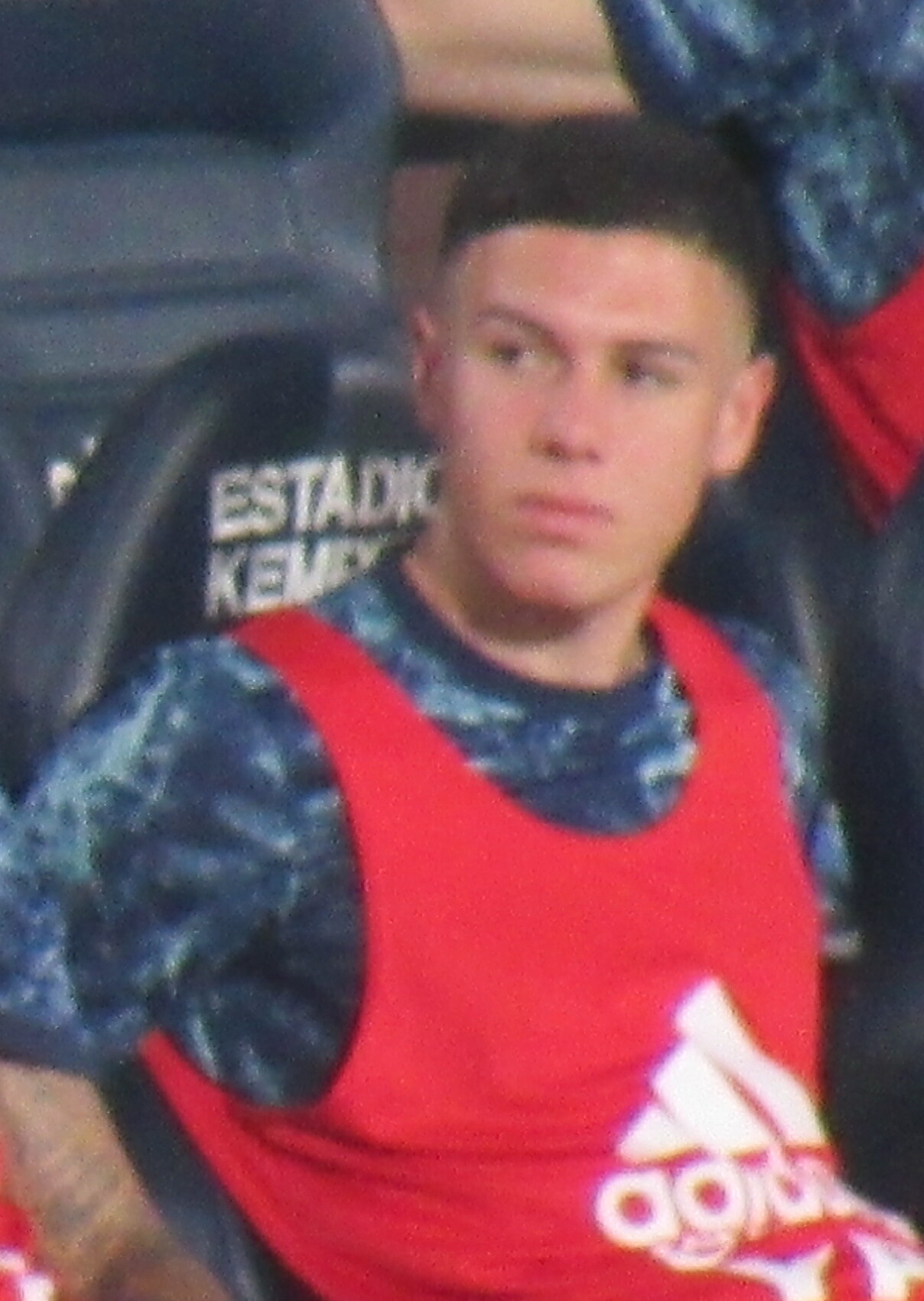
- Pérez with Argentina in 2022

Personal information
- Full name: Patricio Nehuén Pérez
- Date of birth: 24 June 2000 (age 26)
- Place of birth: Hurlingham, Argentina
- Height: 1.86 m (6 ft 1 in)
- Position: Centre-back

Team information
- Current team: Porto
- Number: 18

Youth career
- La Quinta de Los Pibes
- Unión de Tesei
- 2007–2017: Argentinos Juniors

Senior career*
Years	Team	Apps	(Gls)
2017–2018	Argentinos Juniors	0	(0)
2018–2022	Atlético Madrid	0	(0)
2018–2019	→ Argentinos Juniors (loan)	3	(0)
2019–2020	→ Famalicão (loan)	23	(1)
2020–2021	→ Granada (loan)	14	(0)
2021–2022	→ Udinese (loan)	20	(0)
2022–2025	Udinese	72	(2)
2024–2025	→ Porto (loan)	25	(1)
2025–	Porto	9	(2)

International career^{‡}
2017	Argentina U17	4	(0)
2019	Argentina U20	11	(1)
2020–	Argentina U23	14	(2)
2022–	Argentina	3	(0)
Medal record
Representing Argentina
Pre-Olympic Tournament
Winner	2020 Colombia
- * Club domestic league appearances and goals as of 19:28, 25 August 2026 (UTC) ‡ National team caps and goals as of 19 November 2024 (UTC)

Patricio Nehuén Pérez (born 24 June 2000) is an Argentine professional footballer who plays as a centre-back for Primeira Liga club Porto and the Argentina national team.

== Club career ==
Pérez joined Argentinos Juniors' system in 2007, after spells with La Quinta de Los Pibes and Unión de Tesei. He first appeared in the club's first-team squad under manager Alfredo Berti during the 2017–18 Argentine Primera División season which culminated with the defender making his debut in a Copa Argentina tie with Independiente de Chivilcoy on 9 May 2018. In July, Pérez was signed by La Liga's Atlético Madrid. He was immediately loaned back to Argentinos Juniors. Pérez was an unused substitute ten times in 2018–19, before making his league debut during a 2–1 defeat to Tigre on 12 November.

On 10 July 2019, Pérez joined the newly promoted Primeira Liga side Famalicão on a season-long loan. His opening appearance for them came in the Taça da Liga versus Covilhã on 3 August. He scored his first senior goal on 31 August, netting in a league victory away from home against Aves. He was named as the league's best defender for August. In total, Pérez appeared twenty-five times during his time with Famalicão as they placed sixth. He returned to his parent club ahead of the 2020–21 season, subsequently going unused on the bench for all three of Atlético's opening La Liga fixtures.

On 5 October 2020, Pérez was loaned to fellow La Liga side Granada. He made his debut on 25 October away to Getafe, which preceded his first UEFA Europa League appearances arriving on 5 November in Cyprus against Omonia.

On 28 August 2021, Pérez joined Italian side Udinese on a season-long loan. On 29 July 2022, he transferred to Udinese, signing a five-year contract.

On 30 August 2024, Pérez moved on loan to Porto, with an option to buy.

== International career ==
Pérez represented Argentina at U17 level, making four appearances at the 2017 South American U-17 Championship in Chile. He also trained with the senior squad in June 2017 and at the 2018 FIFA World Cup. In December 2018, Pérez was selected for the 2019 South American U-20 Championship. Fernando Batista called up Pérez for the subsequent 2019 FIFA U-20 World Cup in Poland, where he scored once in three games. Batista also picked Pérez for the U23s in the succeeding September for a Bolivia friendly. Pérez received his first senior call for November 2019 friendlies with Brazil and Uruguay.

== Career statistics ==
=== Club ===
As of match played 23 August 2026

Appearances and goals by club, season and competition
Club	Season	League			National cup (Note: Includes Copa Argentina, Taça de Portugal, Copa del Rey, Coppa Italia)		League cup (Note: Includes Taça da Liga)		Continental		Other		Total	
Club	Season	Division	Apps	Goals	Apps	Goals	Apps	Goals	Apps	Goals	Apps	Goals	Apps	Goals
Argentinos Juniors	2017–18	Argentine Primera División	0	0	1	0	—		—		0	0	1	0
Atlético Madrid	2018–19	La Liga	0	0	0	0	—		0	0	0	0	0	0
Atlético Madrid	2019–20	La Liga	0	0	0	0	—		0	0	0	0	0	0
Atlético Madrid	2020–21	La Liga	0	0	0	0	—		0	0	0	0	0	0
Atlético Madrid	Total		0	0	0	0	0	0	0	0	0	0	0	0
Argentinos Juniors (loan)	2018–19	Argentine Primera División	3	0	0	0	0	0	—		0	0	3	0
Famalicão (loan)	2019–20	Primeira Liga	23	1	1	0	1	0	—		0	0	25	1
Granada (loan)	2020–21	La Liga	11	0	2	0	—		3 (Note: Appearances in UEFA Europa League)	0	0	0	16	0
Udinese (loan)	2021–22	Serie A	20	0	2	0	—		—		—		22	0
Udinese	2022–23	Serie A	34	2	2	2	—		—		—		36	4
Udinese	2023–24	Serie A	36	0	0	0	—		—		—		36	0
Udinese	2024–25	Serie A	2	0	1	0	—		—		—		3	0
Udinese	Total		92	2	5	2	0	0	0	0	0	0	97	4
Porto (loan)	2024–25	Primeira Liga	25	1	2	0	2	0	9	0	1 (Note: Appearance in FIFA Club World Cup)	0	39	1
Porto	2025–26	Primeira Liga	6	1	0	0	0	0	0	0	0	0	6	1
Porto	2026–27	Primeira Liga	3	1	0	0	0	0	0	0	0	0	3	1
Porto	Total		9	2	0	0	0	0	0	0	0	0	9	2
Career total			163	6	11	2	3	0	12	0	1	0	190	8

=== International ===
As of match played 19 November 2024

Appearances and goals by national team and year
National team	Year	Apps	Goals
Argentina	2022	1	0
Argentina	2024	2	0
Total		3	0

== Honours ==
Porto

- Primeira Liga: 2025–26
- Supertaça Cândido de Oliveira: 2026

Argentina U23

- Pre-Olympic Tournament: 2020

Individual

- Primeira Liga Defender of the Month: September 2019
