= William Gomes =

Brazilian footballer

Personal information
- Full name: William Gomes Carvalho Santos
- Date of birth: 15 March 2006 (age 20)
- Place of birth: Aracaju, Brazil
- Height: 1.71 m (5 ft 7 in)
- Position: Winger

Team information
- Current team: Porto
- Number: 7

Youth career
- –2021: Baden Powell Clube
- 2021–2024: São Paulo

Senior career*
| Years | Team | Apps | (Gls) |
| 2023–2025 | São Paulo | 16 | (3) |
| 2025– | Porto | 44 | (10) |
| 2025 | Porto B | 1 | (0) |

International career^{‡}
| 2021 | Brazil U15 | | |
| 2022–2023 | Brazil U17 | 2 | (0) |
- * Club domestic league appearances and goals as of 19:40, 17 October 2026 (UTC) ‡ National team caps and goals as of 16 April 2022

William Gomes Carvalho Santos (born 15 March 2006), better known as William Gomes, is a Brazilian professional footballer who plays as a winger for Primeira Liga club Porto.

== Club career ==
Since joining São Paulo's youth academy in 2021, William Gomes was frequently called up for Brazil's youth teams, in the U15 and U17 categories. Being part of a generation considered to have great talent, he had a meteoric rise in the 2023 season, being quickly promoted to the professional squad by manager Dorival Júnior.

William signed his first professional contract in March 2023, with a release clause of R$ 440 million. He was called for the first team squad for the first time on 12 November 2023, in the match against Santos. On 22 November 2023, he made his debut as a professional footballer against Fluminense alongside another youth highlight, Talles Wander.

On 31 January 2025, Gomes moved from São Paulo to Portuguese Primeira Liga club Porto for a fee of €9 million, with left-back Wendell moving in the opposite direction on a free transfer. He signed a contract until June 2029, with a release clause set at €80 million. Gomes made his debut for the Dragons a week later, coming on as a substitute for the final minutes of a 1–1 league draw at home to Sporting CP. He scored his first goal for Porto on 24 June, in a 4–4 draw against Egyptian side Al Ahly, in the FIFA Club World Cup.

Gomes started the 2025–26 season in good form, scoring in a 4–0 win over Casa Pia and in a 2–1 away victory over rivals Sporting CP - with the latter, a long-range shot, earning him the Primeira Liga Goal of the Month award for August 2025. On 25 September 2025, he scored a last-minute winner in a 1–0 UEFA Europa League win away at Red Bull Salzburg.

== Career statistics ==
As of match played 10 October 2026

Appearances and goals by club, season and competition
| Club | Season | League | | | State league (Note: Includes Campeonato Paulista) | | National cup (Note: Includes Copa do Brasil, Taça de Portugal) | | League cup (Note: Includes Taça da Liga) | | Continental | | Other | | Total | |
| Club | Season | Division | Apps | Goals | Apps | Goals | Apps | Goals | Apps | Goals | Apps | Goals | Apps | Goals | Apps | Goals |
|---|---|---|---|---|---|---|---|---|---|---|---|---|---|---|---|---|
| São Paulo | 2023 | Série A | 3 | 0 | 0 | 0 | 0 | 0 | — | | — | | — | | 3 | 0 |
| São Paulo | 2024 | Série A | 11 | 3 | 1 | 0 | 1 | 0 | — | | 3 (Note: Appearances in Copa Libertadores) | 0 | — | | 16 | 3 |
| São Paulo | 2025 | Série A | 0 | 0 | 1 | 0 | 0 | 0 | — | | 0 | 0 | — | | 1 | 0 |
| São Paulo | Total | | 14 | 3 | 2 | 0 | 1 | 0 | — | | 3 | 0 | — | | 20 | 3 |
| Porto B | 2024–25 | Liga Portugal 2 | 1 | 0 | — | | — | | — | | — | | — | | 1 | 0 |
| Porto | 2024–25 | Primeira Liga | 8 | 0 | — | | 0 | 0 | 0 | 0 | 1 (Note: Appearances in UEFA Europa League) | 0 | 2 (Note: Appearances in FIFA Club World Cup) | 1 | 11 | 1 |
| Porto | 2025–26 | Primeira Liga | 28 | 8 | — | | 6 | 1 | 1 | 0 | 11 | 4 | — | | 46 | 13 |
| Porto | 2026–27 | Primeira Liga | 8 | 2 | — | | 0 | 0 | 0 | 0 | 1 (Note: Appearance in UEFA Champions League) | 0 | 1 (Note: Appearance in Supertaça Cândido de Oliveira) | 0 | 10 | 2 |
| Porto | Total | | 44 | 10 | — | | 6 | 1 | 1 | 0 | 13 | 4 | 3 | 1 | 67 | 16 |
| Career total | | | 59 | 13 | 2 | 0 | 7 | 1 | 1 | 0 | 16 | 4 | 3 | 1 | 88 | 19 |

== Honours ==
Porto

- Primeira Liga: 2025–26
- Supertaça Cândido de Oliveira: 2026

Individual

- Primeira Liga Goal of the Month: August 2025
- Primeira Liga Goal of the Season: 2025–26
