= Martim Fernandes =

Portuguese footballer (born 2006)

Personal information
- Full name: Martim Moreira Moutinho Fernandes
- Date of birth: 18 January 2006 (age 20)
- Place of birth: Valongo, Portugal
- Height: 1.83 m (6 ft 0 in)
- Position: Right-back

Team information
- Current team: Porto
- Number: 52

Youth career
- 2015–2017: Valonguense
- 2017–2024: Porto

Senior career*
Years	Team	Apps	(Gls)
2022–	Porto B	36	(1)
2023–	Porto	55	(2)

International career^{‡}
2021	Portugal U16	2	(0)
2022–2023	Portugal U17	14	(1)
2023	Portugal U19	7	(0)
2025–	Portugal U21	4	(0)
Medal record
Men's football
Representing Portugal
UEFA European Under-19 Championship
Runner-up	2023 Malta
- * Club domestic league appearances and goals as of 20:00, 8 November 2026 (UTC) ‡ National team caps and goals as of 21:44, 17 November 2026 (UTC)

Martim Moreira Moutinho Fernandes (born 18 January 2006) is a Portuguese professional footballer who plays as a right-back for Primeira Liga club Porto.

== Club career ==
Born in Valongo, Porto District, Fernandes joined FC Porto's academy aged 11. On 18 January 2022, his 16th birthday, he signed his first professional contract.

Fernandes made his senior debut with the B team on 7 August 2022, starting a 1–0 Liga Portugal 2 home loss against S.C. Covilhã, and at 16 years and six months became their youngest ever debutant in the division, breaking Rui Pedro's record by four months. On 28 September 2023, he was named Porto's Young Athlete of the Year and, the following month, was included in The Guardian's: Next Generation 2023 list of outstanding talents.

On 20 October 2023, Fernandes played his first competitive match with the main squad, as a 73rd-minute replacement for João Mário in the 2–0 away win over GD Vilar de Perdizes in the third round of the Taça de Portugal. He scored his first professional goal on 17 March 2024, helping Porto's reserves to a 1–1 draw at C.D. Feirense.

With starting right-back João Mário injured, Fernandes was surprisingly picked by manager Sérgio Conceição for an important match against rivals Sporting CP on 29 April 2024; in the 40th minute of his Primeira Liga bow, he made a long run forward and assisted Pepê for Porto's second goal, but the hosts eventually conceded a 2–2 draw. He went on to start the remaining three league matches of the season, being a used substitute in the Portuguese Cup final, a 2–1 victory over the same opposition.

Following a collision with S.L. Benfica's Sidny Lopes Cabral in the Portuguese Cup quarter-finals on 14 January 2026, Fernandes played more than 70 minutes with a broken nose; Porto won 1–0 at the Estádio do Dragão to go through. He scored his first goal for the first team 12 days later, the second in a 3–0 home defeat of Gil Vicente F.C. where he was voted player of the match.

== International career ==
Fernandes was part of the Portugal under-17 squad at the 2019 UEFA European Championship. He then represented the under-19s in the 2023 European Championship, where they finished runners-up; in the final against Italy, he had a second-half chance to equalise Michael Kayode's winner, but Davide Mastrantonio saved it to keep the score at 1–0.

On 10 October 2025, Fernandes earned his first cap at under-21 level, featuring 59 minutes of a 3–0 home win over Bulgaria in the 2027 UEFA European Championship qualifiers.

== Career statistics ==
As of match played 2 May 2026

Appearances and goals by club, season and competition
Club	Season	League			Taça de Portugal		Taça da Liga		Continental		Other		Total	
Club	Season	Division	Apps	Goals	Apps	Goals	Apps	Goals	Apps	Goals	Apps	Goals	Apps	Goals
Porto B	2022–23	Liga Portugal 2	11	0	—		—		—		—		11	0
Porto B	2023–24	Liga Portugal 2	24	1	—		—		—		—		24	1
Porto B	2025–26	Liga Portugal 2	1	0	—		—		—		—		1	0
Porto B	Total		36	1	—		—		—		—		36	1
Porto	2023–24	Primeira Liga	4	0	2	0	0	0	0	0	—		6	0
Porto	2024–25	Primeira Liga	25	0	2	0	1	0	5 (Note: Appearances in UEFA Europa League)	0	4 (Note: One appearance in Supertaça Cândido de Oliveira, three appearances in FIFA Club World Cup)	0	37	0
Porto	2025–26	Primeira Liga	20	1	3	0	1	0	9	0	—		33	1
Porto	Total		49	1	7	0	2	0	14	0	4	0	76	1
Career total			85	2	7	0	2	0	14	0	4	0	112	2

== Honours ==
Porto

- Primeira Liga: 2025–26
- Taça de Portugal: 2023–24
- Supertaça Cândido de Oliveira: 2024, 2026
