= 2022–23 Taça de Portugal =

Taça de Portugal Placard

Tournament details
- Country: Portugal
- Dates: 9 September 2022 – 4 June 2023
- Teams: 152

Final positions
- Champions: Porto (19th title)
- Runners-up: Braga

Tournament statistics
- Matches played: 153
- Goals scored: 517 (3.38 per match)
- Top goal scorer(s): Tamble Monteiro (6 goals)

The 2022–23 Taça de Portugal (also known as Taça de Portugal Placard for sponsorship reasons) was the 83rd edition of the Taça de Portugal, the premier knockout competition in Portuguese football. A total of 152 clubs competed in this edition, including all teams from the top four tiers of the Portuguese football league system – excluding reserve or B teams, which were not eligible – and representatives of the fifth-tier District leagues and cups.

The competition began on 9 September 2022 with the first-round matches involving teams from the third, fourth and fifth tiers, and concluded on 4 June 2023 with the final at the Estádio Nacional in Oeiras. Primeira Liga side Porto were the defending champions after defeating Tondela 3–1 in the 2022 final, and successfully defended their title after a 2–0 win over Braga in the 2023 final.

As Porto secured qualification to the 2023–24 UEFA Champions League by league ranking, the cup winner's place in the 2023–24 UEFA Europa League was thus transferred to the league's fourth-placed team, Sporting CP. Consequently, the league's fifth- and sixth-placed teams, Arouca and Vitória de Guimarães, qualified instead for the 2023–24 UEFA Europa Conference League third and second qualifying rounds, respectively. As winners, Porto will also play in the 2023 Supertaça Cândido de Oliveira against the 2022–23 Primeira Liga winners, Benfica.

== Format ==
Round	Clubs remaining	Clubs involved	Winners from previous round	New entries this round	Leagues entering at this round (tier)
First round	152	118	none	118	Liga 3 (3rd): 21 teams Campeonato de Portugal (4th): 54 teams District Football Associations (5th): 43 teams
Second round	110	92	42+34	16	Liga Portugal 2 (2nd): 16 teams
Third round	64	64	46	18	Primeira Liga (1st): 18 teams
Fourth round	32	32	32	none	none
Fifth round	16	16	16	none	none
Quarter-finals	8	8	8	none	none
Semi-finals	4	4	4	none	none
Final	2	2	2	none	none

== Teams ==
A total of 152 teams competed in the 2022–23 edition, comprising 18 teams from the Primeira Liga (tier 1), 16 teams from the Liga Portugal 2 (tier 2), 21 teams from the Liga 3 (tier 3), 54 teams from the Campeonato de Portugal (tier 4) and 43 teams from the District championships and cups (tier 5). (Note: Reserve teams are not allowed to compete in cups. For this reason, Benfica B and Porto B, who play in Liga Portugal 2; Braga B, Sporting CP B and Vitória de Guimarães B, who play in Liga 3; Marítimo B and Pedras Salgadas (Chaves satellite team) who play in Campeonato de Portugal, did not compete in this tournament.)

=== Primeira Liga ===
- Arouca
- Benfica
- Boavista
- Braga
- Casa Pia
- Chaves
- Estoril
- Famalicão
- Gil Vicente
- Marítimo
- Paços de Ferreira
- Porto
- Portimonense
- Rio Ave
- Santa Clara
- Sporting CP
- Vitória de Guimarães
- Vizela

=== Liga Portugal 2 ===
- Académico de Viseu
- B-SAD
- Estrela da Amadora
- Farense
- Feirense
- Leixões
- Mafra
- Moreirense
- Nacional
- Oliveirense
- Penafiel
- Sp. Covilhã
- Tondela
- Torreense
- Trofense
- Vilafranquense

=== Liga 3 ===
Série A

- Anadia
- Canelas 2010
- Fafe
- Felgueiras
- Länk Vilaverdense
- Montalegre
- Paredes
- Sanjoanense
- São João de Ver
- Varzim

Série B

- Académica
- Alverca
- Amora
- Belenenses
- Caldas
- Fontinhas
- Moncarapachense
- Oliveira do Hospital
- Real SC
- União de Leiria
- Vitória de Setúbal

=== Campeonato de Portugal ===
Série A

- Amarante
- Bragança
- Brito
- Dumiense
- Maria da Fonte
- Merelinense
- Monção
- Pevidém
- São Martinho
- Tirsense
- Vianense
- Vila Meã
- G.D. Vilar de Perdizes

Série B

- Alpendorada
- Beira-Mar
- Camacha
- Castro Daire
- Gondomar
- Guarda Desportiva
- Leça
- Lusitânia Lourosa
- Machico
- Rebordosa
- Resende
- Salgueiros
- Valadares Gaia

Série C

- 1º Dezembro
- Alcains
- Arronches
- Benfica Castelo Branco
- Coruchense
- Loures
- Marinhense
- Mortágua
- Pêro Pinheiro
- Rio Maior
- Sertanense
- Sintrense
- União da Serra
- União de Santarém

Série D

- Angrense
- Atlético
- Esperança de Lagos
- Fabril do Barreiro
- Ferreiras
- Imortal
- Juventude Évora
- Lusitano Évora
- Olhanense
- Oriental Dragon
- Praiense
- Rabo de Peixe
- Serpa
- Vasco da Gama Vidigueira

=== District Championships ===
Algarve FA

- Culatrense
- Silves

Angra do Heroísmo FA

- Lajense
- Lusitânia

Aveiro FA

- Águeda
- Paivense

Beja FA

- Castrense
- Moura

Braga FA

- Joane
- Santa Eulália

Bragança FA

- Rebordelo
- Vinhais

Castelo Branco FA

- Águias do Moradal
- Pedrógão de São Pedro

Coimbra FA

- Os Marialvas
- Vigor da Mocidade

Évora FA

- Atlético Reguengos
- Monte do Trigo

Guarda FA

- Mêda
- Vila Cortez

Horta FA

- Madalena

Leiria FA

- Pombal
- Portomosense

Lisbon FA

- Olivais e Moscavide
- Oriental

Madeira FA

- 1º de Maio
- Ribeira Brava

Ponta Delgada FA

- São Roque
- Vasco da Gama Ponta Delgada

Portalegre FA

- Mosteirense
- Os Gavionenses

Porto FA

- Freamunde
- Vila Caiz

Santarém FA

- Fazendense
- União Tomar

Setúbal FA

- Comércio e Indústria
- Olímpico Montijo

Viana do Castelo FA

- Atlético dos Arcos
- Courense

Vila Real FA

- Mondinense
- Régua

Viseu FA

- Lusitano Vildemoinhos
- Lamelas

== Schedule ==
All draws were held at the Portuguese Football Federation (FPF) headquarters in Oeiras. Match kick-off times were in WET (UTC±0) from the third round to the semi-finals, and in WEST (UTC+1) during the rest of the competition.

Round	Draw date	Date(s)	Fixtures	Teams	Prize money (Note: These values don't include television transmission fee.)
First round	11 August 2022	9–11 September 2022	42	152 → 110	€3,000
Second round	13 September 2022	1–2 October 2022	46	110 → 64	€4,000
Third round	4 October 2022	14–16 October 2022	32	64 → 32	€5,000
Fourth round	18 October 2022	8–10 November 2022	16	32 → 16	€6,000
Fifth round	14 November 2022	10–12 January 2023	8	16 → 8	€9,000
Quarter-finals	14 November 2022	8–9 February 2023	4	8 → 4	€12,000
Semi-finals	14 November 2022	12 and 26 April 2023 (1st leg); 25 April and 4 May 2023 (2nd leg)	4	4 → 2	€17,500
Final	14 November 2022	4 June 2023	1	2 → 1	€150,000 (losing finalist) €300,000 (winner)

== First round ==
A total of 118 teams representing the Liga 3, Campeonato de Portugal and the District Championships were involved in the first round draw, which was held on 11 August 2022. Thirty-four teams received a bye to the second round and the remaining teams were split into eight series according to geographical proximity. These teams were then paired inside their serie, with the first team drawn playing at home.

Byes

The following thirty-four teams received a bye to the second round:

- Real SC (3)
- Paivense (5)
- Angrense (4)
- Olivais e Moscavide (5)
- Silves (5)
- São Martinho (4)
- Castro Daire (4)
- Vila Caiz (5)
- Loures (4)
- Olímpico Montijo (5)
- Lamelas (5)
- Machico (4)
- Académica (3)
- Belenenses (3)
- Atlético (4)
- Caldas (3)
- Vasco da Gama Vidigueira (4)
- Coruchense (4)
- Moura (5)
- Courense (5)
- Monte do Trigo (5)
- Vitória de Setúbal (3)
- Águeda (5)
- Vigor da Mocidade (5)
- Imortal (4)
- Vasco da Gama Ponta Delgada (5)
- Anadia (3)
- Pevidém (4)
- Amora (3)
- G.D. Vilar de Perdizes (4)
- Fabril do Barreiro (4)
- Guarda Desportiva (4)
- 1º de Maio (5)
- Rabo de Peixe (4)

Matches

10 September 2022 Serie A	Bragança (4)	2–1 (a.e.t.)	(4) Monção	Bragança
15:00	Silvano 100'; Rocha 117'	Report	André Ferreira 104'	Stadium: Estádio Municipal de Bragança; Referee: Sara Moreira Alves

11 September 2022 Serie A	Rebordelo (5)	0–5	(3) Montalegre	Rebordelo
15:00		Report	Lopes 24'; Dias 32'; Silva 56'; Leonardo Teixeira 76'; Pio 81'	Stadium: Campo de Jogos de Rebordelo; Referee: Miguel Fonseca

11 September 2022 Serie A	Maria da Fonte (4)	0–4	(4) Merelinense	Póvoa de Lanhoso
15:00		Report	Cassama 48' (pen.); Abreu 63'; Costa 80'; Silva 90'	Stadium: Campo dos Moínhos Novos; Referee: Bráulio Sousa

11 September 2022 Serie A	Dumiense (4)	4–1	(4) Brito	Dume
15:00	Silveira 21', 48', 62'; Rodrigues 58'	Report	Soares 28'	Stadium: Campo Celestino Lobo; Referee: Pedro Vieira

11 September 2022 Serie A	Länk Vilaverdense (3)	3–1	(5) Atlético dos Arcos	Vila Verde
15:00	Cerqueira 14'; Rios 82'; Dias 88'	Report	Silva 50'	Stadium: Campo Cruz do Reguengo; Referee: Pedro Ferreira

11 September 2022 Serie A	Vinhais (5)	0–4	(4) Vianense	Vinhais
15:00	Pimenta 6', 11' (pen.), 20'; Silva 90'	Report		Stadium: Estádio Municipal de Vinhais; Referee: Dylan Fernandes

11 September 2022 Serie B	Camacha (4)	1–0	(4) Amarante	Camacha
15:00	Vieira 53' (pen.)}	Report		Stadium: Complexo Desportivo da Camacha; Referee: Diogo Ferreira Gonçalves

11 September 2022 Serie B	Fafe (3)	5–0	(4) Ribeira Brava	Fafe
15:00	Silva 9'; Coelho 33', 84'; Matos 70'; Ribeiro 87'	Report		Stadium: Estádio Municipal de Fafe; Referee: Márcio Torres

11 September 2022 Serie B	Santa Eulália (5)	0–1 (a.e.t.)	(4) Tirsense	Vizela
15:00		Report	Souza 98' (pen.)	Stadium: Campo de Jogos C.C.D. Santa Eulália; Referee: Fábio Nunes

11 September 2022 Serie B	Freamunde (5)	2–3	(5) Joane	Freamunde
15:00	Polo 31'; Gonçalves 52'	Report	Silva 1' (pen.); Azevedo 9'; Fonseca 82'	Stadium: Complexo Desportivo do SC Freamunde; Referee: Daniel Pinto

11 September 2022 Serie B	Varzim (3)	2–1 (a.e.t.)	(4) Vila Meã	Fão
16:00	Tovar 114', 119'	Report	Sanches 94'	Stadium: Complexo Desportivo Clube de Futebol de Fão; Referee: Filipa Cunha

11 September 2022 Serie B	Felgueiras (3)	5–2	(5) Mondinense	Felgueiras
20:00	Lemos 11', 47'; Namora 58'; Junior 75' (pen.); Santos 78'	Report	Queirós 36'; Lukman 73'	Stadium: Estádio Dr. Machado de Matos; Referee: Tiago Mendes

10 September 2022 Serie C	Valadares Gaia (4)	5–2	(4) Salgueiros	Madalena
11:00	Cícero 3' (o.g.); Sancho 10'; F. Junior 28'; Cardoso 56'; P. Junior 67'	Report	Mendonça 43'; Cícero 51'	Stadium: Complexo Desportivo de Valadares; Referee: Francisco Coutinho

11 September 2022 Serie C	Gondomar (4)	1–0	(4) Rebordosa	Gondomar
11:00	Mohamed Leite 84'	Report		Stadium: Estádio de São Miguel; Referee: Daniel Vale

11 September 2022 Serie C	Canelas 2010 (3)	2–0	(5) Régua	Canelas
15:00	Silva 20'; Agostinho 72' (pen.)	Report		Stadium: Estádio Clube Futebol Canelas 2010; Referee: Carlos Teixeira

11 September 2022 Serie C	Leça (4)	1–2 (a.e.t.)	(4) Resende	Leça da Palmeira
15:00	Lucas 56' (pen.)	Report	Mendes 90'; Jesus 99'	Stadium: Estádio do Leça FC; Referee: Miguel Silva

11 September 2022 Serie C	Alpendorada (4)	0–1	(3) Paredes	Alpendorada
15:00		Report	Correia 45' (pen.)	Stadium: Estádio Municipal de Alpendorada; Referee: André Neto

11 September 2022 Serie D	Os Marialvas (5)	3–1	(5) Vila Cortez	Cantanhede
15:00	Soares 48'; Rua 52'; Miranda 90'	Report	Carvalho 27' (o.g.)	Stadium: Complexo Desportivo Cantanhede; Referee: Rui Inácio

11 September 2022 Serie D	Lusitano Vildemoinhos (5)	0–3	(3) Sanjoanense	Vildemoinhos
15:00		Report	Silva 12'; Almeida 45' (o.g.); Meek 88'	Stadium: Trambelos; Referee: Antônio Moreira

11 September 2022 Serie D	Mêda (5)	0–6	(4) Beira-Mar	Mêda
15:00		Report	Santiago 8', 42'; 69'; Silva 82', 89'; Duarte 90'	Stadium: Estádio Dr. Augusto César de Carvalho; Referee: Daniel Vicente

11 September 2022 Serie D	São João de Ver (3)	7–1	(4) Mortágua	São João de Ver
15:00	Cá 42'; Ferreira 45'; Pereira 46'; Monteiro 51', 60', 90'; Tardio 67'	Report	Duarte 77'	Stadium: Estádio Clube São João de Ver; Referee: João Carvalho

11 September 2022 Serie D	Oliveira do Hospital (3)	1–0 (a.e.t.)	(4) Lusitânia Lourosa	Oliveira do Hospital
16:45	Tavares 92' (o.g.)	Report		Stadium: Estádio Municipal Tábua; Referee: Rui Silva

11 September 2022 Serie E	Benfica Castelo Branco (4)	8–0	(5) Águias do Moradal	Castelo Branco
15:00	Nhaga 1', 7'; Santos 17'; Alves 45' (pen.), 57'; Gaspar 61', 80'; Afonso 76'	Report		Stadium: Estádio Municipal Castelo Branco; Referee: Luis Filipe

11 September 2022 Serie E	Marinhense (4)	1–2	(4) Idanhense	Marinha Grande
17:00	Miguel Velosa 53'	Report	Carlos Semedo 54', 80'	Stadium: Municipal da Marinha Grande; Referee: João Carvalho

11 September 2022 Serie E	Alcains (4)	0–1	(4) Sertanense	Alcains
15:00		Report	Fortunato 44'	Stadium: Estádio Trigueiros do Aragão; Referee: Paulo Raposo

11 September 2022 Serie E	Serra (4)	5–1	(5) Pedrógão de São Pedro	Santa Catarina da Serra
15:00	Pereira 31', 38' (pen.); Marques 41'; D. Gonçalves 69', 90'	Report	R. Gonçalves 58'	Stadium: Campo da Portela; Referee: João Santos

11 September 2022 Serie E	Marinhense (4)	0–1	(3) União de Leiria	Marinha Grande
15:00		Report	Antunes 25'	Stadium: Campo Portela; Referee: João Mendes

11 September 2022 Serie E	Pombal (5)	1–1 (a.e.t.) (3–0 p)	(5) União Tomar	Pombal
15:00	Júlio 90'	Report	Silva 20'	Stadium: Estádio Municipal de Pombal; Referee: Luís Máximo

9 September 2022 Serie F	Alverca (3)	2–0	(4) Rio Maior	Alverca do Ribatejo
16:45	Barros 31'; Campos 76'	Report		Stadium: Complexo Desportivo FC Alverca; Referee: Paulo Barradas

11 September 2022 Serie F	União de Santarém (4)	1–0	(5) Os Gavionenses	Santarém
15:00	Cardoso 15'	Report		Stadium: Campo Chã Das Padeiras; Referee: André Mendes

11 September 2022 Serie F	Pêro Pinheiro (4)	7–1	(5) Portomosense	Sintra
15	Anjos 13'; Bastos 37'; Lamas 40' (pen.), 63'; Zago 64', 82'; Pinto 78'	Report	Gregório 4'	Stadium: Parque de Jogos Pardal Monteiro; Referee: David Salvador

11 September 2022 Serie F	Arronches (4)	2–0	(5) Mosteirense	Arronches
15:00	Sá 30'; Gomes 80'	Report		Stadium: Estádio Municipal de Arronches; Referee: Hélder Nunes

11 September 2022 Serie F	Sintrense (5)	1–0	(5) Fazendense	Sintra
15:00	Rodrigues 52'	Report		Stadium: Estadio do Sport União Sintrense; Referee: André Vasques

9 September 2022 Serie G	Lusitânia (5)	2–3 (a.e.t.)	(4) Praiense	Angra do Heroísmo
19:00	Marquez 2'; Araúz 84'	Report	Lara 69'; Cláudio 82'; Supunpasuch 109'	Stadium: Estádio João Paulo II; Referee: João Matos

11 September 2022 Serie G	Oriental (5)	1–0	(5) Madalena	Lisbon
15:00	Baessa 72'	Report		Stadium: Estádio Engenheiro Carlos Salema; Referee: José Jesus

11 September 2022 Serie G	Lajense (5)	3–2	(5) São Roque	Praia da Vitória
15:00	Martins 2'; Queirós 36'; Melo 84'	Report	Costa 13'; Rodrigues 82'	Stadium: Campo Municipal Manuel Linhares Lima; Referee: Filipe Mestre

11 September 2022 Serie G	Oriental Dragon (4)	2–1 (a.e.t.)	(4) 1º Dezembro	Moita
15:00	Águas 10'; Furtado 118'	Report	Costa 35'	Stadium: Campo Santos Jorge; Referee: Eduardo Brites

11 September 2022 Serie G	Lusitano Évora (4)	0–2	(3) Fontinhas	Évora
15:00		Report	Doukoure 63'; Almeida 66'	Stadium: Campo Estrela; Referee: José Rodrigues

10 September 2022 Serie H	Esperança de Lagos (4)	2–0	(5) Comércio e Indústria	Lagos
20:00	Duarte 34' (pen.); Tomé 59'	Report		Stadium: Estádio Municipal de Lagos; Referee: Sandra Bastos

11 September 2022 Serie H	Atlético Reguengos (5)	2–5	(4) Olhanense	Reguengos de Monsaraz
15:00	Elias 59'; Ramalho 90'	Report	Barataud 29'; Pires 52'; Amessan 69' (pen.); Loureiro 79'; Próspero 82'	Stadium: Campo Virgilio Durão; Referee: Teresa Oliveira

11 September 2022 Serie H	Serpa (4)	3–0	(4) Castrense	Serpa
15:00	Seco 8'; Conceição 56'; Ganhão 74'	Report		Stadium: Complexo Desportivo Manuel Baião; Referee: Pedro Afonso

11 September 2022 Serie H	Juventude de Évora (4)	3–0	(3) Moncarapachense	Évora
15:00	Batista 13'; Lima 74'; Semedo 84'	Report		Stadium: Estádio Sanches de Miranda; Referee: Sérgio Jesus

11 September 2022 Serie H	Ferreiras (4)	2–0	(5) Culatrense	Ferreiras
16:00	Barbosa 9'; Rodrigues 32'	Report		Stadium: Estádio da Nora; Referee: André Baltasar

== Second round ==
A total of 92 teams were involved in the second round draw, which was held on 13 September 2022. The 16 teams from the Liga Portugal 2 joined the 42 winners from first round and the 34 teams that received a bye to the second round. All Liga Portugal 2 teams played this round as visitors.

Number of teams per tier entering this round
Primeira Liga (1)	Liga Portugal 2 (2)	Liga 3 (3)	Campeonato de Portugal (4)	District Championships (5)	Total
18 / 18	16 / 16	20 / 21	38 / 54	18 / 43	110 / 152

1 October 2022	Benfica Castelo Branco (3)	0–1	(2) Farense	Castelo Branco
11:00		Report	Costa 20'	Stadium: Estádio Municipal Castelo Branco; Referee: João Gonçalves

1 October 2022	Lajense (5)	1–3	(2) Moreirense	Praia da Vitória
14:00	Queiros 27'	Report	Chagas 11'; Pacheco 15'; Alan 65'	Stadium: Campo Municipal Manuel Linhares Lima; Referee: Anzhony Rodrigues

1 October 2022	Varzim (3)	1–0	(2) Feirense	Cidade da Maia
14:00	Santos 90'	Report		Stadium: Estádio Municipal Dr. José Vieira de Carvalho; Referee: Carlos Macedo

1 October 2022	Joane (3)	0–3	(2) B-SAD	Joane
15:00		Report	Kikas 20' (pen.), 66'; Lopes 35'	Stadium: Estádio de Barreiros; Referee: Manuel Oliveira

1 October 2022	Vasco da Gama Vidigueira (4)	0–5	(2) Leixões	Vidigueira
15:00		Report	Ćalasan 39', 64'; Morais 42'; Freitas 66'; Eduardo 81'	Stadium: Estádio Municipal De Vidigueira; Referee: Pedro Ramalho

1 October 2022	Sanjoanense (3)	3–1	(5) Os Marialvas	São João da Madeira
15:00	Rebelo 14'; Manga 18'; Barbosa 45'	Report	Manga 77' (o.g.)	Stadium: Estádio Conde Dias Garcia; Referee: Rui Silva

1 October 2022	1º de Maio (5)	0–8	(4) Serpa	Viseu
15:00		Report	Cruz 2'; Tounkara 26'; Serrão 32'; Castillo 73', 90'; Delgado 75'; Marques 78'; Maior 80'	Stadium: Campo 1º Maio; Referee: Joao Costa

1 October 2022	Oliveira do Hospital (4)	1–1 (a.e.t.) (4–1 p)	(2) Estrela da Amadora	Oliveira do Hospital
15:00	Daniel 66'	Report	Salomão 90'	Stadium: Estádio Municipal Tábua; Referee: Manuel Mota

1 October 2022	Águeda (5)	0–1	(4) Pevidém	Águeda
15:00		Report	Okwara 90'	Stadium: Estádio Municipal de Águeda; Referee: Tiago Sá

1 October 2022	União de Leiria (3)	0–1	(3) Montalegre	Rio Maior
15:00		Report	Teixeira 34' (pen.)	Stadium: Estádio Municipal de Rio Maior; Referee: José Rodrigues

1 October 2022	Arronches (4)	0–2	(4) Vianense	Arronches
16:00		Report	Ribeiro 39'; Silva 90'	Stadium: Estádio Municipal Arronches; Referee: Flávio Duarte

1 October 2022	Belenenses (3)	3–1	(2) Torreense	Lisbon
16:45	Tavares 44', 89'; Fernandes 76'	Report	Vieira 2'	Stadium: Estádio do Restelo; Referee: Nuno Almeida

2 October 2022	São João de Ver (3)	3–0	(4) Esperança de Lagos	São João de Ver
11:00	Cá 38' (pen.); Poulson 56' (pen.); Monteiro 76'	Report		Stadium: Estádio Clube São João de Ver; Referee: Pedro Ferreira

2 October 2022	Lamelas (5)	0–0 (a.e.t.) (5–6 p)	(4) Camacha	Castro Daire
11:00		Report		Stadium: Complexo Desportivo Castro Daire; Referee: Paulo Silva

2 October 2022	Gondomar (4)	2–3 (a.e.t.)	(2) Penafiel	Gondomar
11:00	Silva 45'; Agbaoye 78'	Report	Fortes 53'; Oliveira 90'; Rodrigo 94'	Stadium: Estádio de São Miguel; Referee: Bruno Pires Costa

2 October 2022	Santarém (4)	0–1	(2) Mafra	Santarém
14:00		Report	Goulart 57'	Stadium: Campo Chã Das Padeiras; Referee: David Silva

2 October 2022	Oriental (5)	1–1 (a.e.t.) (5–4 p)	(3) Paredes	Lisbon
15:00	Fernandes 5'	Report	Correia 49'	Stadium: Estádio Engenheiro Carlos Salema; Referee: José Gorjão

2 October 2022	Resende (4)	1–2	(3) Felgueiras	Resende
15:00	Edelino 77'	Report	Peixoto 55'; Ferreira 83'	Stadium: Estádio Municipal de Fornelos; Referee: Tiago Neves

2 October 2022	Pombal (5)	2–0	(5) Vigor da Mocidade	Pombal
15:00	Paranhos 45'; Rosa 61'	Report		Stadium: Estádio Municipal de Pombal; Referee: Rúben Cardoso

2 October 2022	Machico (4)	1–1 (a.e.t.) (4–3 p)	(3) Alverca	Machico
15:00	Câmara 85'	Report	Brandão 34'	Stadium: Estádio Municipal de Machico; Referee: Sérgio Guelho

2 October 2022	Sertanense (4)	3–0	(4) Castro Daire	Sertã
15:00	Karamoko 9' (pen.); Santos 66'; Victor 81'	Report		Stadium: Campo Dr. Marques Santos; Referee: Henrique Caldeira

2 October 2022	Fafe (3)	1–2	(3) Anadia	Fafe
15:00	Ribeiro 6'	Report	Lourenço 37', 60'	Stadium: Estádio Municipal de Fafe; Referee: Marco Cruz

2 October 2022	Silves (5)	3–5 (a.e.t.)	(5) Courense	Silves
15:00	Gomes 38'; Santos 43'; Martins 78'	Report	Araújo 47'; Barbosa 65' (pen.), 81'; Nogueira 104'; Kakou 118'	Stadium: Estádio Dr. Francisco Vieira; Referee: Gonçalo Nunes

2 October 2022	Moura (5)	0–5	(4) Dumiense	Moura
15:00		Report	Oliveira 16'; Rego 64'; Silveira 67'; Araújo 79', 90'	Stadium: Estádio do Moura Atlético Clube; Referee: Daniel Martins

2 October 2022	Bragança (4)	1–0	(5) Olímpico Montijo	Bragança
15:00	Nshimirimana 90'	Report		Stadium: Estádio Municipal de Bragança; Referee: Fernando Ferreira

2 October 2022	Vila Caiz (5)	1–3 (a.e.t.)	(3) Amora	Amarante
15:00	20'	Report	Rodriguez 50'; Monteiro 100'; Vieira 111'	Stadium: Estádio Municipal de Amarante; Referee: Rui Lima

2 October 2022	Oriental Dragon (4)	0–2	(3) Canelas 2010	Moita
15:00		Report	Agostinho 55'; Monteiro 59'	Stadium: Campo Santos Jorge; Referee: Bruno Rebocho

2 October 2022	Fabril do Barreiro (4)	2–6	(2) Académico de Viseu	Barreiro
15:00	Andrade 25' (pen.); Esguedelhado 37'	Report	Clóvis 7'; Ott 20', 22'; Toro 45'; Almeida 60'; Quizera 82'	Stadium: Complexo Desportivo Alfredo da Silva; Referee: Ricardo Baixinho

2 October 2022	Serra (4)	0–4	(2) Oliveirense	Santa Catarina da Serra
15:00		Report	Pedro 6'; Bastos 17'; Reis 35'; Michel 43'	Stadium: Campo da Portela; Referee: João Pinho

2 October 2022	Juventude Évora (4)	2–3 (a.e.t.)	(2) Vilafranquense	Évora
15:00	Pinto 55'; Delgado 111'	Report	Belkheir 35' (pen.); Nenê 94'; Sangaré 101'	Stadium: Estádio Sanches de Miranda; Referee: Hélder Carvalho

2 October 2022	Coruchense (4)	0–2	(2) Trofense	Coruche
15:00		Report	Okitokandjo 20', 53'	Stadium: Estádio Municipal José Peseiro; Referee: Diogo Rosa

2 October 2022	Loures (4)	0–3	(4) Beira-Mar	Loures
15:00		Report	Duarte 4'; Santiago 11' (pen.); Machado 48'	Stadium: Campo José da Silva Faria; Referee: Gonçalo Teixeira

2 October 2022	Olhanense (4)	1–0	(5) Monte do Trigo	Olhão
15:00	Aubourg 51'	Report		Stadium: Estádio Municipal de Olhão; Referee: Miguel Silva

2 October 2022	Sintrense (4)	2–3 (a.e.t.)	(3) Real SC	Sintra
15:00	Antunes 29'; Elói 42' (pen.)	Report	Barbeiro 31'; Henriques 90'; Soares 111' (pen.)	Stadium: Parque de Jogos do Sport União Sintrense; Referee: João Pinto

2 October 2022	Vitória de Setúbal (3)	4–0	(4) G.D. Vilar de Perdizes	Setúbal
15:00	Fragozo 33', 67'; Varela 48'; Oliveira 64'	Report		Stadium: Estádio do Bonfim; Referee: Gonçalo Neves

2 October 2022	Merelinense (4)	3–4 (a.e.t.)	(4) Rabo de Peixe	Braga
15:00	Samate 11'; Cassama 18'; Rodriguez 83' (o.g.)	Report	Rodriguez 21'; Tavares 24'; Benevides 27'; Medeiros 97'	Stadium: Estádio João Soares Vieira; Referee: Fábio Costa

2 October 2022	Valadares Gaia (4)	2–0	(5) Olivais e Moscavide	Valadares
15:00	Claro 5'; Vieira 45'	Report		Stadium: Complexo Desportivo de Valadares; Referee: Rúben Martins

2 October 2022	São Martinho (4)	3–3 (a.e.t.) (4–3 p)	(4) Guarda Desportiva	São Martinho do Campo
15:00	Carvalho 6'; Martins 74', 119'	Report	Maquiesse 20'; Duque 56'; Garcia 95'	Stadium: Campo Comendador Abílio Ferreira De Oliveira; Referee: Hugo Cerqueira

2 October 2022	Länk Vilaverdense (3)	2–1 (a.e.t.)	(4) Atlético	Vila Verde
15:00	Seguro 8' (o.g.); Cerqueira 117' (pen.)	Report	Rosário 18'	Stadium: Campo Cruz do Reguengo; Referee: Humberto Teixeira

2 October 2022	Pêro Pinheiro (4)	2–1	(4) Ferreiras	Sintra
15:00	Pinto 48'; Lamas 80'	Report	Rodrigues 52'	Stadium: Parque de Jogos Pardal Monteiro; Referee: Jorge Carreira

2 October 2022	Paivense (5)	1–2	(4) Tirsense	Castelo de Paiva
15:00	Cândido 18'	Report	Souza 5'; Martins 86'	Stadium: Campo Municipal Da Boavista; Referee: Hélder Gonçalves

2 October 2022	Vasco da Gama Ponta Delgada (5)	0–1	(4) Imortal	Vila da Povoação
15:00		Report	Domingues 3'	Stadium: Campo Municipal Povoação; Referee: Ricardo Carrico

2 October 2022	Fontinhas (3)	5–0	(4) Praiense	São Bento
15:00	Doukoure 22'; Cruz 45', 88'; Graça 64'; Freitas 85'	Report		Stadium: Estádio João Paulo II; Referee: Rui Soares

2 October 2022	Angrense (4)	0–2	(2) Nacional	Angra do Heroísmo
16:00		Report	Daniel 35'; Manuel 57'	Stadium: Campo Municipal Angra do Heroísmo; Referee: Iancu Vasilica

2 October 2022	Caldas (3)	3–0	(2) Sp. Covilhã	Caldas da Rainha
17:00	Silva 13'; Marques 86', 90'	Report		Stadium: Campo da Mata; Referee: Bruno Vieira

2 October 2022	Académica (3)	1–1 (a.e.t.) (2–4 p)	(2) Tondela	Coimbra
20:00	dos Anjos 55' (o.g.)	Report	Arcanjo 37'	Stadium: Estádio Cidade de Coimbra; Referee: Miguel Nogueira

== Third round ==
A total of 64 teams were involved in the third round draw, which was held on 4 October 2022. The 18 teams from the Primeira Liga joined the 46 winners from second round. All Primeira Liga teams played this round as visitors.

Number of teams per tier entering this round
Primeira Liga (1)	Liga Portugal 2 (2)	Liga 3 (3)	Campeonato de Portugal (4)	District Championships (5)	Total
18 / 18	12 / 16	15 / 21	16 / 54	3 / 43	64 / 154

14 October 2022	Olhanense (4)	0–2	(2) B-SAD	Olhão
15:00		Report	Jefferson 14'; Lopes 52'	Stadium: Estádio José Arcanjo; Referee: Pedro Ramalho

14 October 2022	Moreirense (2)	3–0	(2) Vilafranquense	Moreira de Cónegos
15:30	Kodisang 15'; Amador 30'; Gomes 51' (pen.)	Report		Stadium: Parque de Jogos Comendador Joaquim de Almeida Freitas; Referee: David Silva

14 October 2022	Amora (3)	2–3	(1) Estoril	Amora
20:45	Vieira 14'; Duque 90'	Report	Carvalho 57'; Siliki 63'; Erison 82'	Stadium: Complexo Municipal de Atletismo Carla Sacramento; Referee: Antônio Nobre

15 October 2022	Nacional (2)	3–1 (a.e.t.)	(2) Oliveirense	Funchal
11:00	Witi 14'; Dudu 108'; Danilović 113'	Report	Borges 81'	Stadium: Estádio da Madeira; Referee: Flávio Lima

15 October 2022	Fontinhas (3)	0–2	(1) Arouca	Angra do Heroísmo
11:00		Report	Dabbagh 10'; Marques 79'	Stadium: Estádio João Paulo II; Referee: Hélder Carvalho

15 October 2022	Sanjoanense (3)	3–2 (a.e.t.)	(3) Belenenses	São João da Madeira
15:00	Barbosa 81'; Benedict 95'; Silva 112'	Report	Correia 45' (pen.); Tavares 103' (pen.)	Stadium: Estádio Conde Dias Garcia; Referee: Marco Cruz

15 October 2022	Mafra (2)	4–2 (a.e.t.)	(1) Marítimo	Mafra
15:00	Rodrigues 42'; Murilo 90', 115'; Lucas 111'	Report	Mendes 21'; Xadas 59'	Stadium: Estádio Municipal de Mafra; Referee: Nuno Almeida

15 October 2022	Trofense (2)	0–1	(1) Famalicão	Trofa
15:00		Report	Rodríguez 69'	Stadium: Estádio do CD Trofense; Referee: Rui Costa

15 October 2022	Canelas 2010 (3)	1–3	(1) Vitória de Guimarães	Canelas
15:00	Samu 45'	Report	André 22' (pen.); Johnston 26', 39'	Stadium: Estádio do Canelas; Referee: Hélder Malheiro

15 October 2022	Serpa (4)	0–3	(1) Gil Vicente	Serpa
15:00		Report	Martins 15' (o.g.); Alipour 30'; Arai 53'	Stadium: Parque Desportivo De Serpa; Referee: Fábio Veríssimo

15 October 2022	Académico de Viseu (2)	1–0	(5) Oriental	Viseu
15:30	Quizera 5'	Report		Stadium: Estádio do Fontelo; Referee: João Afonso

15 October 2022	Imortal (4)	0–3	(2) Farense	Albufeira
15:30		Report	Velásquez 6'; Matias 23', 26'	Stadium: Municipal de Albufeira; Referee: Iancu Vasilica

15 October 2022	Penafiel (2)	3–3 (a.e.t.) (1–2 p)	(1) Vizela	Penafiel
15:30	Castanheira 4'; Silva 61'; Mølvadgaard 69'	Report	Bondoso 46'; Sarmiento 76'; Isaac 81'	Stadium: Estádio Municipal 25 de Abril; Referee: Manuel Oliveira

15 October 2022	Tondela (2)	2–0	(1) Santa Clara	Tondela
20:00	Barbosa 38'; Fonseca 90'	Report		Stadium: Estádio João Cardoso; Referee: João Pinheiro

15 October 2022	Caldas (3)	1–1 (a.e.t.) (3–5 p)	(1) Benfica	Caldas da Rainha
20:45	Barreiras 74'	Report	Musa 53'	Stadium: Campo da Mata; Referee: Claúdio Pereira
	Penalties
	Clemente (penalty missed); Simões (penalty scored); Borges (penalty scored); Rodrigues (penalty scored)		(penalty scored) Fernández; (penalty scored) Ristić; (penalty scored) Aursnes; (penalty scored) Chiquinho; (penalty scored) João Mário

16 October 2022	Machico (4)	1–0	(1) Boavista	Machico
15:00	Gouveia 45'	Report		Stadium: Estádio Municipal de Machico; Referee: André Narciso

16 October 2022	Pêro Pinheiro (3)	4–0	(5) Pombal	Sintra
15:00	Lamas 4' (pen.), 20'; Hilário 64'; Mavengo 86'	Report		Stadium: Parque de Jogos Pardal Monteiro; Referee: Rui Inácio

16 October 2022	Montalegre (3)	1–3	(3) São João de Ver	Montalegre
15:00	Guimarães 16' (pen.)	Report	Poulson 50'; Monteiro 63', 69'	Stadium: Estádio Dr. Diogo Alves Vaz Pereira; Referee: Rui Lima

16 October 2022	Rabo de Peixe (4)	2–1	(4) Sertanense	Rabo de Peixe
15:00	Estrela 31'; Andrade 53' (pen.)	Report	Ferreira 27'	Stadium: Campo de Jogos Bom Jesus; Referee: Fábio Nunes

16 October 2022	Dumiense (4)	2–1	(3) Real	Braga
15:00	Silveira 71'; Rego 79'	Report	Tavares 11'	Stadium: Campo Celestino Lobo; Referee: João Casegas

16 October 2022	Bragança (4)	0–1 (a.e.t.)	(4) Pevidém	Bragança
15:00		Report	Costa 97'	Stadium: Estádio Municipal de Bragança; Referee: Miguel Silva

16 October 2022	Länk Vilaverdense (3)	2–0	(1) Portimonense	Vila Verde
15:00	Soares 30'; Filho 90'	Report		Stadium: Campo Cruz do Reguengo; Referee: Vitor Ferreira

16 October 2022	Oliveira do Hospital (3)	3–2 (a.e.t.)	(1) Rio Ave	Oliveira do Hospital
15:00	Batalha 67', 72' (pen.); Daniel 114'	Report	Acevedo 25'; Gomes 76'	Stadium: Estádio Municipal Tábua; Referee: Luís Godinho

16 October 2022	São Martinho (4)	0–2	(1) Casa Pia	São Martinho do Campo
15:00		Report	Martins 51'; Poloni 90'	Stadium: Campo Comendador Abílio Ferreira De Oliveira; Referee: Manuel Mota

16 October 2022	Courense (5)	0–6	(4) Camacha	Paredes de Coura
15:00		Report	Abreu 17'; Gomes 45'; Silva 53'; Vieira 61'; Andrade 81', 88'	Stadium: Campo Jogos Sc Courense; Referee: Flávio Jesus

16 October 2022	Tirsense (4)	1–4	(2) Leixões	Santo Tirso
15:00	Fontes 35'	Report	Morais 37'; Silva 62'; Araújo 74'; Oliveira 82'	Stadium: Estádio Abel Alves de Figueiredo; Referee: João Pinho

16 October 2022	Valadares Gaia (4)	3–2 (a.e.t.)	(1) Chaves	Valadares
15:00	Joseph 84'; F. Junior 90'; P. Junior 112' (pen.)	Report	Vitória 34'; Guima 90'	Stadium: Complexo Desportivo Valadares; Referee: Ricardo Baixinho

16 October 2022	Vianense (4)	1–2	(4) Beira-Mar	Viana do Castelo
15:00	Silva 37'	Report	Santiago 79' (pen.), 82'	Stadium: Estádio Municipal Manuela Machado; Referee: Pedro Vieira

16 October 2022	Vitória de Setúbal (3)	2–0	(1) Paços de Ferreira	Setúbal
15:00	Varela 46'; Sene 71'	Report		Stadium: Estádio do Bonfim; Referee: Carlos Macedo

16 October 2022	Felgueiras (3)	1–2	(1) Braga	Felgueiras
17:00	Rodrigues 64'	Report	Rodrigues 61'; Oliveira 89'	Stadium: Estádio Dr. Machado de Matos; Referee: João Gonçalves

16 October 2022	Varzim (3)	1–0	(1) Sporting	Barcelos
19:00	Faria 70'	Report		Stadium: Estádio Cidade de Barcelos; Referee: Bruno Costa

16 October 2022	Anadia (3)	0–6	(1) Porto	Anadia
20:45		Report	Loader 6'; Veron 11'; Martínez 31', 86'; Cardoso 50'; B. Costa 90'	Stadium: Estádio Municipal Engenheiro Sílvio Henriques Cerveira; Referee: Miguel Nogueira

== Fourth round ==
A total of 32 teams were involved in the fourth round draw, which was held on 18 October 2022.

Number of teams per tier entering this round
Primeira Liga (1)	Liga Portugal 2 (2)	Liga 3 (3)	Campeonato de Portugal (4)	District Championships (5)	Total
10 / 18	8 / 16	6 / 21	8 / 54	0 / 43	32 / 154

8 November 2022	Länk Vilaverdense (3)	7–0	(3) Oliveira do Hospital	Vila Verde
14:00	Monteiro 4', 37'; Silva 9'; Morais 33'; Filho 43'; Fati 85'; Teixeira 90'	Report		Stadium: Campo Cruz do Reguengo; Referee: Pedro Ferreira

8 November 2022	Gil Vicente (1)	1–4	(1) Arouca	Barcelos
18:45	Carvalho 17'	Report	Mújica 6', 38', 58'; Velázquez 45'	Stadium: Estádio Cidade de Barcelos; Referee: Gustavo Correia

8 November 2022	Varzim (3)	1–0	(3) São João de Ver	Póvoa de Varzim
19:00	Quivira 41'	Report		Stadium: Estádio do Varzim SC; Referee: Tiago Neves

8 November 2022	Mafra (2)	0–3	(1) Porto	Mafra
20:45		Report	Marcano 7'; Eustáquio 38'; Galeno 73'	Stadium: Estádio Municipal de Mafra; Referee: Hélder Malheiro

9 November 2022	Académico de Viseu (2)	3–0	(4) Camacha	Viseu
11:00	Almeida 11'; Bruno 17'; Labila 86'	Report		Stadium: Estádio do Fontelo; Referee: João Gonçalves

9 November 2022	Pêro Pinheiro (4)	1–4	(3) Vitória de Setúbal	Sintra
14:30	Mavengo 58'	Report	Varela 44', 45', 80'; Lima 90'	Stadium: Parque de Jogos Pardal Monteiro; Referee: João Pinto

9 November 2022	Nacional (2)	1–0	(2) Tondela	Funchal
15:00	Dudu 74' (pen.)	Report		Stadium: Estádio da Madeira; Referee: Manuel Mota

9 November 2022	Famalicão (1)	4–1	(4) Dumiense	Vila Nova de Famalicão
15:00	Cádiz 19', 28'; Youssouf 45'; Colombatto 48'	Report	Martins 66'	Stadium: Estádio Municipal 22 de Junho; Referee: Manuel Oliveira

9 November 2022	Leixões (2)	3–1	(2) Farense	Matosinhos
15:00	Oliveira 30'; Valente 33', 52'	Report	Falcão 83'	Stadium: Estádio do Mar; Referee: Carlos Macedo

9 November 2022	Rabo de Peixe (4)	2–0	(3) Sanjoanense	Rabo de Peixe
16:00	Reis 40'; Benevides 90'	Report		Stadium: Campo de Jogos Bom Jesus; Referee: Antônio Moreira

9 November 2022	Beira-Mar (4)	3–2	(4) Pevidém	Aveiro
16:00	Carlitos 51'; Vieira 57'; Fonseca 90'	Report	Alves 41'; Monteiro 70'	Stadium: Estádio Municipal de Aveiro; Referee: João Bernardino

9 November 2022	Casa Pia (1)	2–0	(4) Valadares Gaia	Lisbon
17:45	Martins 25'; Anderson 30'	Report		Stadium: Estádio Pina Manique; Referee: André Narciso

9 November 2022	Vitória de Guimarães (1)	2–1 (a.e.t.)	(1) Vizela	Guimarães
18:45	Wilson 30' (o.g.); Safira 100' (pen.)	Report	Zohi 81'	Stadium: Estádio D. Afonso Henriques; Referee: Claudio Pereira

9 November 2022	Estoril (1)	0–1	(1) Benfica	Estoril
20:45		Report	Neres 66'	Stadium: Estádio António Coimbra da Mota; Referee: Fábio Veríssimo

10 November 2022	B-SAD (2)	4–0	(4) Machico	Oeiras
11:00	Jefferson 2'; Lopes 17'; Coxixo 23' (pen.); Boni 55'	Report		Stadium: Estádio Nacional; Referee: Hélder Carvalho

10 November 2022	Braga (1)	2–1	(2) Moreirense	Braga
19:45	Horta 14'; Lainez 88'	Report	Platiny 29'	Stadium: Estádio Municipal de Braga; Referee: Artur Dias

== Fifth round ==
A total of 16 teams were involved in the fifth round draw, which was held on 14 November 2022. Campeonato de Portugal's Rabo de Peixe and Beira-Mar were the lowest ranked teams in the draw.

Number of teams per tier entering this round
Primeira Liga (1)	Liga Portugal 2 (2)	Liga 3 (3)	Campeonato de Portugal (4)	District Championships (5)	Total
7 / 18	4 / 16	3 / 21	2 / 54	0 / 43	16 / 154

10 January 2023	Leixões (2)	1–2 (a.e.t.)	(1) Famalicão	Matosinhos
18:45	Thalis 90+8' (pen.)	Report	Penetra 77'; Cádiz 108'	Stadium: Estádio do Mar; Referee: Ricardo Baixinho

10 January 2023	Varzim (3)	0–2	(1) Benfica	Póvoa de Varzim
20:45		Report	Grimaldo 4'; Fernández 78'	Stadium: Estádio do Varzim SC; Referee: Manuel Oliveira

11 January 2023	Länk Vilaverdense (3)	1–4	(2) B-SAD	Vila Verde
14:00	Kikas 66' (o.g.)	Report	Lopes 1'; Jefferson 20'; Kikas 78' (pen.); Pacheco 90+5'	Stadium: Campo Cruz do Reguengo; Referee: Fábio Veríssimo

11 January 2023	Nacional (2)	1–0	(4) Rabo de Peixe	Funchal
17:30	Gomes 26'	Report		Stadium: Estádio da Madeira; Referee: Cláudio Pereira

11 January 2023	Braga (1)	3–2	(1) Vitória de Guimarães	Braga
18:45	Ruiz 80', 85'; Oliveira 83'	Report	Silva 16'; Anderson 45+6'	Stadium: Estádio Municipal de Braga; Referee: Artur Soares Dias

11 January 2023	Académico de Viseu (2)	2–0	(4) Beira-Mar	Viseu
20:15	Yuri 43'; Quizera 90+5'	Report		Stadium: Estádio do Fontelo; Referee: Carlos Macedo

11 January 2023	Porto (1)	4–0	(1) Arouca	Porto
20:45	Galeno 31'; Martínez 54', 57', 90+3'	Report		Stadium: Estádio do Dragão; Referee: João Gonçalves

12 January 2023	Vitória de Setúbal (3)	0–1	(1) Casa Pia	Setúbal
19:45		Report	Eteki 3'	Stadium: Estádio do Bonfim; Referee: António Nobre

== Quarter-finals ==
Number of teams per tier entering this round
Primeira Liga (1)	Liga Portugal 2 (2)	Liga 3 (3)	Campeonato de Portugal (4)	District Championships (5)	Total
5 / 18	3 / 16	0 / 21	0 / 54	0 / 43	8 / 154

8 February 2023	Famalicão (1)	4–1	(2) B-SAD	Vila Nova de Famalicão
18:45	Dobre 37'; Cádiz 57', 59'; Jaime 68'	Report	Oliveira 65'	Stadium: Estádio Municipal 22 de Junho; Referee: João Gonçalves

8 February 2023	Académico de Viseu (2)	0–1	(1) Porto	Viseu
20:45		Report	Franco 50'	Stadium: Estádio do Fontelo; Referee: Gustavo Correia

9 February 2023	Casa Pia (1)	2–5 (a.e.t.)	(2) Nacional	Lisbon
18:30	Pinto 53'; Nunes 80'	Report	Esteves 44', 46'; Danilović 94' (pen.); Gomes 105+3'; Silva 108'	Stadium: Estádio Pina Manique; Referee: Miguel Nogueira

9 February 2023	Braga (1)	1–1 (a.e.t.) (5–4 p)	(1) Benfica	Braga
20:30	Al-Musrati 36'	Report	Guedes 15'	Stadium: Estádio Municipal de Braga; Referee: Tiago Martins
	Penalties
	R. Horta (penalty scored); Djaló (penalty scored); Castro (penalty scored); Oliveira (penalty scored); Al-Musrati (penalty scored)		(penalty scored) João Mário; (penalty scored) Otamendi; (penalty scored) A. Silva; (penalty missed) Aursnes; (penalty scored) Grimaldo

== Semi-finals ==
Number of teams per tier entering this round
Primeira Liga (1)	Liga Portugal 2 (2)	Liga 3 (3)	Campeonato de Portugal (4)	District Championships (5)	Total
3 / 18	1 / 16	0 / 21	0 / 54	0 / 43	4 / 154

12 April 2023
19:30

Nacional (2)	0–5	(1) Braga
	Report	Račić 25', 53' (pen.); Pizzi 43'; Banza 76' (pen.), 90+1'

Estádio da Madeira, Funchal
Referee: Cláudio Pereira
25 April 2023
19:30

Braga (1)	2–2	(2) Nacional
Račić 33' (pen.); Gomes 48'	Report	Clayton 72'; Dudu 90+2' (pen.)

Estádio Municipal de Braga, Braga
Referee: João Gonçalves

Braga won 7–2 on aggregate.

26 April 2023
20:30

Famalicão (1)	1–2	(1) Porto
Penetra 37'	Report	Marcano 16'; Martínez 63'

Estádio Municipal 22 de Junho, Vila Nova de Famalicão
Referee: Gustavo Correia
4 May 2023
20:30

Porto (1)	3–2 (a.e.t.)	(1) Famalicão
Galeno 28' (pen.); Otávio 120+1'; Evanilson 120+5'	Report	Cádiz 21'; Jaime 75'

Estádio do Dragão, Porto
Referee: Manuel Mota

Porto won 5–3 on aggregate.

== Final ==
4 June 2023
17:15 WEST

Braga	0–2	Porto
	Report	A. Horta 53' (o.g.); Otávio 81'

Estádio Nacional, Oeiras
Attendance: 35,000
Referee: João Pinheiro

== Bracket ==
Fifth round
12 January 2023
Vitória de Setúbal	0
Casa Pia	1
11 January 2023
Nacional	1
Rabo de Peixe	0
11 January 2023
Braga	3
Vitória de Guimarães	2
10 January 2023
Varzim	0
Benfica	2
10 January 2023
Leixões	1
Famalicão (a.e.t.)	2
11 January 2023
Länk Vilaverdense	1
B-SAD	4
11 January 2023
Académico de Viseu	2
Beira-Mar	0
11 January 2023
Porto	4
Arouca	0

Quarter-finals
9 February 2023
Casa Pia	2
Nacional (a.e.t.)	5
9 February 2023
Braga (p)	1 (5)
Benfica	1 (4)
8 February 2023
Famalicão	4
B-SAD	1
8 February 2023
Académico de Viseu	0
Porto	1

Semi-finals
12 and 25 April 2023
Nacional	0	2	2
Braga	5	2	7
26 April and 4 May 2023
Famalicão	1	2	3
Porto (a.e.t.)	2	3	5

Final
4 June 2023
Braga	0
Porto	2

== Top scorers ==
Rank	Player	Club	Goals
1	(Portugal) Tamble Monteiro	São João de Ver	6
1	(Spain) Toni Martínez	Porto	6
1	(Venezuela) Jhonder Cádiz	Famalicão	6
4	(Portugal) Marcelo Santiago	Beira-Mar	5
4	(Brazil) João Victor	Dumiense	5
4	(Portugal) Diogo Lamas	Pêro Pinheiro	5
4	(Cape Verde) José Varela	Vitória de Setúbal	5
8	(Portugal) Tiago Lopes	B-SAD	4
