= 2023–24 Taça de Portugal =

Taça de Portugal Placard

Tournament details
- Country: Portugal
- Dates: 8 September 2023 – 26 May 2024
- Teams: 146

Final positions
- Champions: Porto (20th title)
- Runners-up: Sporting CP

Tournament statistics
- Matches played: 113
- Goals scored: 377 (3.34 per match)
- Top goal scorer(s): Evanilson (8 goals)

The 2023–24 Taça de Portugal (also known as Taça de Portugal Placard for sponsorship reasons) was the 84th edition of the Taça de Portugal, the premier knockout competition in Portuguese football. The winners qualified for the 2024–25 UEFA Europa League league stage.

A total of 146 teams entered the cup. All teams from the top four tiers of the Portuguese football league system competed in this edition – excluding reserve or B teams, which were not eligible – together with representatives of the fifth-tier District leagues and cups. The competition began on 8 September 2023 with the first-round matches involving teams from the third, fourth and fifth tiers, and concluded on 26 May 2024 with the final at the Estádio Nacional in Oeiras.

Primeira Liga side Porto were the two-time defending champions, having beaten Braga 2–0 in the 2023 final. They would go on to successfully defend their title and secure a third consecutive title by defeating Sporting CP 2–1, after extra time, in the 2024 final.

== Format ==
| Round | Clubs remaining | Clubs involved | Winners from previous round | New entries this round | Leagues entering at this round (tier) |
|---|---|---|---|---|---|
| First round | 146 | 112 | none | 112 | Liga 3 (3rd): 18 teams Campeonato de Portugal (4th): 53 teams District Football Associations (5th): 41 teams |
| Second round | 110 | 92 | 36+40 | 16 | Liga Portugal 2 (2nd): 16 teams |
| Third round | 64 | 64 | 46 | 18 | Primeira Liga (1st): 18 teams |
| Fourth round | 32 | 32 | 32 | none | none |
| Fifth round | 16 | 16 | 16 | none | none |
| Quarter-finals | 8 | 8 | 8 | none | none |
| Semi-finals | 4 | 4 | 4 | none | none |
| Final | 2 | 2 | 2 | none | none |

== Teams ==
A total of 146 teams competed in the 2023–24 edition, comprising 18 teams from the Primeira Liga (tier 1), 16 teams from the Liga Portugal 2 (tier 2), 18 teams from the Liga 3 (tier 3), 53 teams from the Campeonato de Portugal (tier 4) and 41 teams from the District championships and cups (tier 5).

=== Primeira Liga ===
- Arouca
- Benfica
- Boavista
- Braga
- Casa Pia
- Chaves
- Estoril
- Estrela da Amadora
- Famalicão
- Farense
- Gil Vicente
- Moreirense
- Porto
- Portimonense
- Rio Ave
- Sporting CP
- Vitória de Guimarães
- Vizela

=== Liga Portugal 2 ===
- Académico de Viseu
- AVS
- Belenenses
- Feirense
- Länk Vilaverdense
- Leixões
- Mafra
- Marítimo
- Nacional
- Oliveirense
- Paços de Ferreira
- Penafiel
- Santa Clara
- Tondela
- Torreense
- União de Leiria

=== Liga 3 ===
Série A

- Anadia
- Canelas 2010
- Fafe
- Felgueiras
- Lusitânia Lourosa
- Sanjoanense
- Trofense
- Varzim
- Vianense

Série B

- Atlético
- 1º Dezembro
- Académica
- Alverca
- Amora
- Caldas
- Oliveira do Hospital
- Pêro Pinheiro
- Sp. Covilhã

=== Campeonato de Portugal ===
Série A

- Brito
- Camacha
- Dumiense
- Limianos
- Mirandela
- Montalegre
- Os Sandinenses
- Portosantense
- Pevidém
- Ribeirão
- Tirsense
- Vilar de Perdizes
- Vila Real

Série B

- Amarante
- Beira-Mar
- Florgrade
- Gondomar
- Lamelas
- Marco 09
- Oliveira do Douro
- Paredes
- Rebordosa
- Salgueiros
- São João de Ver
- Valadares Gaia
- Vila Meã

Série C

- Benfica Castelo Branco
- Fontinhas
- Gouveia
- Lusitânia
- Marinhense
- Mortágua
- Peniche
- Rabo de Peixe
- Sertanense
- União 1919
- União de Santarém
- União Tomar
- Vitória de Sernache

Série D

- Barreirense
- Fabril do Barreiro
- Imortal
- Juventude Évora
- Louletano
- Lusitano Évora
- Moncarapachense
- O Elvas
- Oriental
- Real SC
- Serpa
- Sintrense
- Vasco da Gama Vidigueira
- Vitória de Setúbal

=== District Championships ===
Algarve FA

- Quarteirense SAD

Angra do Heroísmo FA

- Guadalupe
- Luzense

Aveiro FA

- União de Lamas
- Lobão

Beja FA

- Castrense
- Penedo Gordo

Braga FA

- Ponte
- Santa Maria

Bragança FA

- Rebordelo
- Torre Moncorvo

Castelo Branco FA

- Vitória de Sernache
- Pedrógão de São Pedro

Coimbra FA

- Tocha
- Marialvas

Évora FA

- Atlético Reguengos
- Portel

Guarda FA

- Fornos de Algodres
- Os Vilanovenses

Horta FA

- Flamengos
- Vitória Pico

Leiria FA

- Pombal
- Alqueidão da Serra

Lisbon FA

- Atlético da Malveira
- Olivais e Moscavide

Ponta Delgada FA

- Operário Lagoa
- União Micaelense

Portalegre FA

- Gafetense
- Os Gavionenses

Porto FA

- Foz
- Aliados Lordelo

Santarém FA

- Amiense
- Torres Novas

Setúbal FA

- Comércio e Indústria
- Alcochetense

Viana do Castelo FA

- Lanheses
- Atlético Arcos A.D.

Vila Real FA

- Mondinense
- Régua

Viseu FA

- Lusitano Vildemoinhos

== Second round ==
The matches of the second round were played on the 23rd and 24th of September.

Number of teams per tier entering this round
| Primeira Liga (1) | Liga Portugal 2 (2) | Liga 3 (3) | Campeonato de Portugal (4) | District Championships (5) | Total |
|---|---|---|---|---|---|
| 18 / 18 | 16 / 16 | 14 / 18 | 47 / 53 | 15 / 41 | 110 / 146 |

| Team 1 | Score | Team 2 |
|---|---|---|
| Fabril do Barreiro (CP) | 1–3 | Marítimo (II) |
| CD Trofense (L3) | 0–1 | Pevidém S.C. (CP) |
| O Elvas (CP) | 1–0 | UD Lanheses (D) |
| SC São João de Ver (CP) | 0–1 | Leixões SC (II) |
| CD Ponte (D) | 0–5 | Länk FC Vilaverdense (II) |
| Louletano DC (CP) | 0–1 | AVS Futebol SAD (II) |
| Portosantense (CP) | 0–1 | Nacional (II) |
| UD Tocha (D) | 0–1 | Rebordosa AC (CP) |
| L.G.C. Moncarapachense (CP) | 6–2 | União Micaelense (D) |
| Lusitânia Lourosa (L3) | 1–2 | Académico de Viseu FC (II) |
| Benfica de Castelo Branco (CP) | 1–1 (6–7 pso) | UD Oliveirense (II) |
| Lusitano Évora (CP) | 0–0 (2–3 pso) | SC Covilhã (L3) |
| Lusitânia Açores (CP) | 1–0 | C.F. Os Marialvas (D) |
| GD Vilar de Perdizes (CP) | 5–1 | CF Vasco da Gama (CP) |
| CF Canelas 2010 (L3) | 5–0 | G.D. Fontinhas (CP) |
| Vitória de Sernache (CP) | 0–3 | SC Vianense (L3) |
| Sporting de Pombal (D) | 0–5 | CD Tondela (II) |
| Mortágua FC (CP) | 2–1 | Amora FC (L3) |
| Sertanense FC (CP) | 0–2 | Amarante FC (CP) |
| ACDR Lamelas (CP) | 1–3 | FC Tirsense (CP) |
| GD Peniche (CP) | 2–2 (4–5 pso) | CDC Montalegre (CP) |
| Valadares Gaia FC (CP) | 1–1 (2–4 pso) | FC Penafiel (II) |
| CDR Quarteirense (D) | 0–1 | Belenenses (II) |
| Atlético dos Arcos (D) | 2–2 (3–4 pso) | AC Malveira (D) |
| ADRC Pedrogão (D) | 0–12 | União Leiria (II) |
| FC Felgueiras 1932 (L3) | 4–0 | AD Limianos (CP) |
| CCR Alqueidão Serra (D) | 1–3 | AD Marco 09 (CP) |
| Dumiense FC (CP) | 4–3 | União de Santarém (CP) |
| GD Ribeirão (CP) | 0–3 | CD Santa Clara (II) |
| GDR Gafetense (D) | 0–5 | CD Mafra (II) |
| SC Salgueiros (CP) | 0–1 | Santa Maria FC (D) |
| CD Rabo Peixe (CP) | 3–2 | CF Oliveira do Douro (CP) |
| Clube Oriental de Lisboa (CP) | 0–1 | SC União Torreense (II) |
| USC Paredes (CP) | 5–1 | Florgrade FC (CP) |
| Académica de Coimbra (L3) | 3–2 | FC Oliveira Hospital (L3) |
| FC Castrense (D) | 0–3 | AC Vila Meã (CP) |
| AD Sanjoanense (L3) | 0–1 | Vitória Setúbal (CP) |
| FC Barreirense (CP) | 0–3 | SC Mirandela (CP) |
| Juventude Évora (CP) | 1–2 | Sport União Sintrense (CP) |
| FC Serpa (CP) | 2–1 | CD Gouveia (CP) |
| Brito SC (CP) | 0–2 | CD Feirense (II) |
| União de Tomar (CP) | 1–2 | CA Pêro Pinheiro (L3) |
| SU 1º Dezembro (L3) | 2–0 | Paços de Ferreira (II) |
| Atlético CP (L3) | 1–1 (4–2 pso) | FC Alverca (L3) |
| G.D.R.C. Os Sandinenses (CP) | 0–1 | Olivais e Moscavide (CP) |
| GD Luzense (D) | 0–3 (Note: GD Luzense quit from the tournament.) | AD Camacha (CP) |

== Third round ==
The matches of the third round were played between 19 and 22 October. The match between Camacha and Famalicão was rescheduled due to bad weather in Madeira Island that prevented the plane transporting Famalicão players from landing. The match was played on 18 November.

Number of teams per tier entering this round
| Primeira Liga (1) | Liga Portugal 2 (2) | Liga 3 (3) | Campeonato de Portugal (4) | District Championships (5) | Total |
|---|---|---|---|---|---|
| 18 / 18 | 15 / 16 | 8 / 18 | 20 / 53 | 3 / 41 | 64 / 146 |

| Team 1 | Score | Team 2 |
|---|---|---|
| Rebordosa AC (CP) | 0–2 | Sporting Braga (I) |
| Lusitânia Açores (CP) | 1–4 | Benfica (I) |
| SC Covilhã (L3) | 1–4 | Portimonense SC (I) |
| GD Vilar de Perdizes (CP) | 0–2 | FC Porto (I) |
| USC Paredes (CP) | 2–1 | Moreirense FC (I) |
| Atlético CP (L3) | 0–1 | FC Vizela (I) |
| CD Rabo Peixe (CP) | 0–2 | Casa Pia AC (I) |
| AC Malveira (D) | 1–1; 7–6 pso | AD Marco 09 (CP) |
| Leixões SC (II) | 1–1; 3–4 pso | Vitória Setúbal (CP) |
| AC Vila Meã (CP) | 0–1 | CF Estrela Amadora (I) |
| Académico de Viseu FC (II) | 1–3 | União Leiria (II) |
| CD Olivais e Moscavide (D) | 1–3 | Sporting CP (I) |
| Sport União Sintrense (CP) | 0–5 | GD Estoril Praia (I) |
| SC União Torreense (II) | 2–1 | Rio Ave FC (I) |
| FC Penafiel (II) | 3–0 | Santa Maria FC (D) |
| FC Felgueiras 1932 (L3) | 1–3 | FC Arouca (I) |
| Länk FC Vilaverdense (II) | 3–2 | SC Farense (I) |
| L.G.C. Moncarapachense (CP) | 1–3 | Vitória de Guimarães (I) |
| CF Canelas 2010 (L3) | 0–0; 5–3 pso | GD Chaves (I) |
| CD Tondela (II) | 2–1 | SU 1º Dezembro (L3) |
| Amarante FC (CP) | 2–1 | Académica de Coimbra (L3) |
| Dumiense FC (CP) | 1–0 | AVS Futebol SAD (II) |
| Nacional (II) | 6–1 | SC Mirandela (CP) |
| CA Pêro Pinheiro (L3) | 0–0; 7–8 pso | FC Serpa (CP) |
| CD Mafra (II) | 1–1; 3–1 e.t. | CD Feirense (II) |
| O Elvas (CP) | 1–1; 4–2 pso | FC Tirsense (CP) |
| Marítimo (II) | 4–1 | Mortágua FC (CP) |
| CDC Montalegre (CP) | 2–1 | Pevidém SC (CP) |
| CD Santa Clara (II) | 0–0; 2–0 e.t. | SC Vianense (L3) |
| Belenenses (II) | 1–2 | Gil Vicente FC (I) |
| UD Oliveirense (II) | 1–3 | Boavista (I) |
| AD Camacha (CP) | 0–5 | FC Famalicão (I) |

== Fourth round ==
The matches of the fourth round were played between 24 and 26 November.

Number of teams per tier entering this round
| Primeira Liga (1) | Liga Portugal 2 (2) | Liga 3 (3) | Campeonato de Portugal (4) | District Championships (5) | Total |
|---|---|---|---|---|---|
| 14 / 18 | 9 / 16 | 1 / 18 | 7 / 53 | 1 / 41 | 32 / 146 |

| Team 1 | Score | Team 2 |
|---|---|---|
| FC Vizela (I) | 1–1; 2–1 e.t. | CF Estrela Amadora (I) |
| Vitória de Guimarães (I) | 4–1 | Länk FC Vilaverdense (II) |
| FC Porto (I) | 4–0 | CDC Montalegre (CP) |
| Sporting CP (I) | 8–0 | Dumiense FC (CP) |
| USC Paredes (CP) | 0–2 | Amarante FC (CP) |
| Portimonense SC (I) | 1–4 | Sporting Braga (I) |
| Benfica (I) | 2–0 | FC Famalicão (I) |
| CF Canelas 2010 (L3) | 1–3 | Marítimo (II) |
| FC Penafiel (II) | 2–2; 3–2 e.t. | Vitória Setúbal (CP) |
| Nacional (II) | 0–0; 6–5 pso | Casa Pia AC (I) |
| FC Arouca (I) | 2–2; 4–3 pso | Boavista (I) |
| O Elvas (CP) | 1–1; 1–4 pso | CD Santa Clara (II) |
| União Leiria (II) | 5–0 | AC Malveira (D) |
| GD Estoril Praia (I) | 2–1 | CD Mafra (II) |
| SC União Torreense (II) | 1–1; 2–4 pso | CD Tondela (II) |
| FC Serpa (CP) | 0–1 | Gil Vicente FC (I) |

== Fifth round ==
Number of teams per tier entering this round
| Primeira Liga (1) | Liga Portugal 2 (2) | Liga 3 (3) | Campeonato de Portugal (4) | District Championships (5) | Total |
|---|---|---|---|---|---|
| 9 / 18 | 6 / 16 | 0 / 18 | 1 / 53 | 0 / 41 | 16 / 146 |

| 9 January 2024 | Sporting CP (1) | 4–0 | Tondela (2) | Lisbon |
| 18:45 | Pedro Gonçalves 11', 17'; Gyökeres 37', 46' | | | Stadium: Estádio José Alvalade |

| 9 January 2024 | Estoril Praia (1) | 0–4 | Porto (1) | Estoril |
| 20:45 | | | Evanilson 24', 32' (pen.), 56'; Galeno 76' | Stadium: Estádio António Coimbra da Mota |

| 10 January 2024 | Marítimo (2) | 0–3 | União de Leiria (2) | Funchal |
| 18:45 | | | da Silva 1'; Valdir 43' (pen.); Vega 73' | Stadium: Estádio do Marítimo |

| 10 January 2024 | Gil Vicente (1) | 3–1 | Amarante (CP) | Barcelos |
| 19:15 | Miro 3'; Fernandes 88'; Neto 90' | | Leandro Santos 82' | Stadium: Estádio Cidade de Barcelos |

| 10 January 2024 | Vizela (1) | 1–0 | Arouca (1) | Vizela |
| 20:00 | Galović 76' (o.g.) | | | Stadium: Estádio do Futebol Clube de Vizela |

| 10 January 2024 | Benfica (1) | 3–2 | Braga (1) | Lisbon |
| 20:45 | Rafa Silva 42'; Cabral 44'; Aursnes 70' | | João Mário 7' (o.g.); Zalazar 48' | Stadium: Estádio da Luz |

| 11 January 2024 | Santa Clara (2) | 1–1 (a.e.t.) (4–2 p) | Nacional (2) | Ponta Delgada |
| 17:00 | Dudu 111' (o.g.) | | Dudu 120' (pen.) | Stadium: Estádio de São Miguel |
| | Penalties |
| | Almeida (penalty scored); Pacheco (penalty scored); Silva (penalty scored); Ricardinho (penalty scored) | | Daniel (penalty missed); Macedo (penalty missed); Gomes (penalty scored); Dudu (penalty scored) |

| 11 January 2024 | Vitória de Guimarães (1) | 1–0 | Penafiel (2) | Guimarães |
| 20:15 | Jota 74' | | | Stadium: Estádio D. Afonso Henriques |

== Quarter-finals ==
Matches in this round may be affected by the ongoing police protests in Portugal.

Number of teams per tier entering this round
| Primeira Liga (1) | Liga Portugal 2 (2) | Liga 3 (3) | Campeonato de Portugal (4) | District Championships (5) | Total |
|---|---|---|---|---|---|
| 6 / 18 | 2 / 16 | 0 / 18 | 0 / 53 | 0 / 41 | 8 / 146 |

| 7 February 2024 | União de Leiria (2) | 0–3 | (1) Sporting CP | Leiria |
| 20:45 | | | Gyökeres 32', 74'; Gonçalves 37' | Stadium: Estádio Dr. Magalhães Pessoa |

| 8 February 2024 | Vitória de Guimarães (1) | 3–1 | (1) Gil Vicente | Guimarães |
| 18:45 | T. Silva 6'; A. Silva 11'; Jota 45+1' | | Murilo 37' | Stadium: Estádio D. Afonso Henriques |

| 8 February 2024 | Vizela (1) | 1–2 | (1) Benfica | Vizela |
| 20:45 | Petrov 68' | | Cabral 44'; João Mário 65' | Stadium: Estádio do Futebol Clube de Vizela |

| 29 February 2024 | Santa Clara (2) | 1–2 | (1) Porto | Ponta Delgada |
| 16:00 | Martins 27' | | Evanilson 52'; Galeno 61' | Stadium: Estádio de São Miguel |
Note: The match started on 7 February but was suspended with 27 minutes played due to pitch flooding. Match was restarted and concluded on 29 February.

== Semi-finals ==
Number of teams per tier entering this round
| Primeira Liga (1) | Liga Portugal 2 (2) | Liga 3 (3) | Campeonato de Portugal (4) | District Championships (5) | Total |
|---|---|---|---|---|---|
| 4 / 18 | 0 / 16 | 0 / 18 | 0 / 53 | 0 / 41 | 4 / 146 |

3 April 2024
20:15

| Vitória de Guimarães (1) | 0–1 | (1) Porto |
|---|---|---|
| | | Pepê 52' |

Estádio D. Afonso Henriques, Guimarães
Attendance: 18,103
Referee: Nuno Almeida
17 April 2024
20:15

| Porto (1) | 3–1 | (1) Vitória de Guimarães |
|---|---|---|
| Taremi 26' (pen.); Conceição 45+5'; Pepê 75' | | Freitas 1' |

Estádio do Dragão, Porto
Attendance: 30,609
Referee: Artur Soares Dias

Porto won 4–1 on aggregate.

29 February 2024
20:45

| Sporting CP (1) | 2–1 | (1) Benfica |
|---|---|---|
| Gonçalves 9'; Gyökeres 54' | | Aursnes 68' |

Estádio José Alvalade, Lisbon
Attendance: 45,393
Referee: Fábio Veríssimo
2 April 2024
20:45

| Benfica (1) | 2–2 | (1) Sporting CP |
|---|---|---|
| Otamendi 52'; R. Silva 64' | | Hjulmand 47'; Paulinho 55' |

Estádio da Luz, Lisbon
Attendance: 59,113
Referee: João Pinheiro

Sporting CP won 4–3 on aggregate.

== Final ==
26 May 2024
17:15

| Porto | 2–1 (a.e.t.) | Sporting CP |
|---|---|---|
| Evanilson 25'; Taremi 100' (pen.) | Report | St. Juste 20' |

Estádio Nacional, Oeiras
Attendance: 37,593
Referee: Fábio Veríssimo

== Bracket ==
Fifth round
11 January 2024
Vitória de Guimarães | 1
Penafiel | 0
10 January 2024
Gil Vicente | 3
Amarante | 1
11 January 2024
Santa Clara (p) | 1 (4)
Nacional | 1 (2)
9 January 2024
Estoril Praia | 0
Porto | 4
10 January 2024
Marítimo | 0
União de Leiria | 3
9 January 2024
Sporting CP | 4
Tondela | 0
10 January 2024
Vizela | 1
Arouca | 0
10 January 2024
Benfica | 3
Braga | 2

Quarter-finals
8 February 2024
Vitória de Guimarães | 3
Gil Vicente | 1
29 February 2024
Santa Clara | 1
Porto | 2
7 February 2024
União de Leiria | 0
Sporting CP | 3
8 February 2024
Vizela | 1
Benfica | 2

Semi-finals
3 and 17 April 2024
Vitória de Guimarães | 0 | 1 | 1
Porto | 1 | 3 | 4
29 February and 2 April 2024
Sporting CP | 2 | 2 | 4
Benfica | 1 | 2 | 3

Final
26 May 2024
Porto (a.e.t.) | 2
Sporting CP | 1

== Top scorers ==
As of 17 April 2024

| Rank | Player | Team | Goals |
|---|---|---|---|
| 1 | (Brazil) Evanilson | Porto | 7 |
| 2 | (Sweden) Viktor Gyökeres | Sporting | 6 |
| 3 | (Brazil) João Victor | Académica | 5 |
| 4 | (Guinea-Bissau) Evanildo Nhaga | Lusitânia | 4 |
| 4 | (Portugal) Pedro Gonçalves | Sporting | 4 |
| 4 | (Portugal) Paulinho | Sporting | 4 |
| 4 | (Portugal) Rafa Silva | Benfica | 4 |
