= Jimmy Ekua =

Equatoguinean footballer (born 1999)

Personal information
- Full name: Miguel Ekua Iala Mangue
- Date of birth: 29 November 1999 (age 26)
- Place of birth: Bata, Equatorial Guinea
- Height: 1.80 m (5 ft 11 in)
- Position: Midfielder

Team information
- Current team: Rápido Bouzas

Youth career
- Huracán
- Internazionale
- 2016: Las Palmas
- 2016–2017: CEF Puertos Las Palmas

Senior career*
Years	Team	Apps	(Gls)
2019–2020	Oliveirense	17	(1)
2020–2021	Marco	11	(0)
2021	Espinho	7	(0)
2022	Serpa	8	(0)
2022	Moncarapachense	0	(0)
2023–	Rápido Bouzas	0	(0)

International career^{‡}
2021–	Equatorial Guinea	2	(0)
- * Club domestic league appearances and goals as of 3 April 2022 ‡ National team caps and goals as of 29 March 2022

Miguel Ekua Iala Mangue (born 29 November 1999), known as Jimmy Ekua, is an Equatorial Guinean footballer who plays as a midfielder for Spanish Tercera Federación club Rápido de Bouzas and the Equatorial Guinea national team.

== Early life ==
Ekua was born in Equatorial Guinea and raised in Las Palmas de Gran Canaria, Spain, where he moved being too young. Subsequently, he became a naturalized citizen of Spain.

== Club career ==
Ekua is a product of AD Huracán in his hometown. He left good impressions during that time, managing to move to the Inter Milan Youth Sector in Italy. He completed his youth formation back in Las Palmas de Gran Canaria for UD Las Palmas and CEF Puertos Las Palmas. He has developed his senior career in Portugal, for UD Oliveirense, AD Marco 09, SC Espinho and Rabo do Peixe.

== International career ==
Ekua was selected to represent the Canary Islands youth team in late February 2017.

In August 2021, Ekua received maiden call-up to Equatorial Guinea national team for FIFA World Cup qualification matches against Tunisia and Mauritania.

== Career statistics ==
=== International ===
As of match played 3 September 2021

Appearances and goals by national team and year
National team	Year	Apps	Goals
Equatorial Guinea	2021	1	0
Total		1	0

== Personal life ==
Ekua's younger brother, José Nneme, is also a footballer and plays for Austrian club ATSV Stadl-Paura.
