= 2023 Taça de Portugal final =

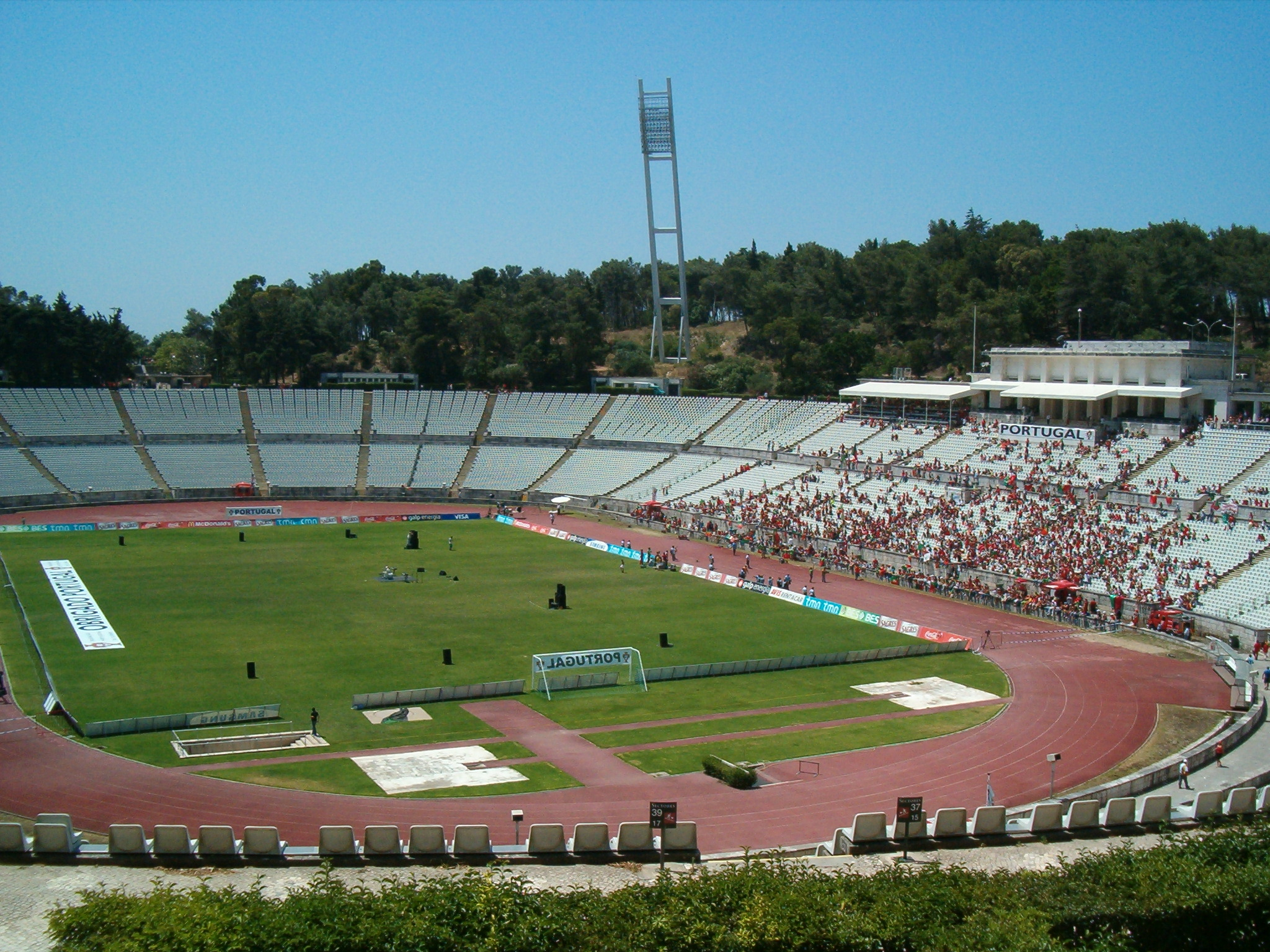
- Estádio Nacional
- Event: 2022–23 Taça de Portugal
Braga	Porto
0	2
- Date: 4 June 2023
- Venue: Estádio Nacional, Oeiras
- Man of the Match: Otávio
- Fair Player of the Match: Ricardo Horta
- Referee: João Pinheiro
- Attendance: 35,000

The 2023 Taça de Portugal final was the last match of the 2022–23 Taça de Portugal, which decided the winner of the 83rd season of the Taça de Portugal, the premier knockout cup competition in Portuguese football. It was played on 4 June 2023 at the Estádio Nacional in Oeiras, between Primeira Liga sides Braga and Porto.

Braga played their eight final in the competition, having last appeared in the 2021 final when they defeated Benfica 2–0 for their third title. Porto played the decisive match for the 33rd time and second consecutive season, having beaten Tondela in the previous season's final to lift the trophy for the 18th time. Braga and Porto have previously played each other in the Taça de Portugal final on three occasions, with Porto winning in 1977 and 1998, and Braga winning their most recent meeting in 2016.

== Route to the final ==
Braga		Round	Porto
Opponent	Result	2022–23 Taça de Portugal	Opponent	Result
Felgueiras 1932	2–1 (A)	Third round	Anadia	6–0 (A)
Moreirense	2–1 (H)	Fourth round	Mafra	3–0 (A)
Vitória de Guimarães	3–2 (H)	Fifth round	Arouca	4–0 (H)
Benfica	1–1 (H) (5–4 pen.)	Quarter-finals	Académico de Viseu	1–0 (A)
Nacional	5–0 (A)	Semi-finals	Famalicão	2–1 (A)
Nacional	2–2 (H)	Semi-finals	Famalicão	3–2 (H) (a.e.t.)

Note: H = home fixture, A = away fixture

== Match ==
=== Details ===
4 June 2023
17:15 WEST

Braga	0–2	Porto
	Report	A. Horta 53' (o.g.); Otávio 81'

Estádio Nacional, Oeiras
Attendance: 35,000
Referee: João Pinheiro

Braga	Porto

GK	1	(Brazil) Matheus
RB	2	(Spain) Víctor Gómez	(yellow card) 66'	(substituted off) 70'
CB	3	(Brazil) Vítor Tormena	(substituted off) 75'
CB	34	(France) Sikou Niakaté	(red card) 79'
LB	26	(Colombia) Cristian Borja	(yellow card) 35'	(substituted off) 58'
RW	21	(Portugal) Iuri Medeiros	(substituted off) 58'
CM	8	(Libya) Ali Musrati
CM	10	(Portugal) André Horta	(yellow card) 29'	(substituted off) 58'
LW	27	(Portugal) Bruma	(yellow card) 85'
CF	9	(Spain) Abel Ruiz
CF	21	(Portugal) Ricardo Horta (c)
Substitutes:
GK	12	(Portugal) Tiago Sá
DF	17	(Sweden) Joe Mendes	(substituted on) 58'
DF	5	(Turkey) Serdar Saatçı
DF	15	(Portugal) Paulo Oliveira
MF	19	(Serbia) Uroš Račić	(substituted on) 58'
MF	22	(Portugal) Pizzi	(substituted on) 75'
MF	88	(Portugal) André Castro
FW	23	(France) Simon Banza	(substituted on) 70'
FW	14	(Spain) Álvaro Djaló	(substituted on) 58'
Manager:
(Portugal) Artur Jorge

GK	14	(Portugal) Cláudio Ramos
RB	11	(Brazil) Pepê	(yellow card) 85'
CB	5	(Spain) Iván Marcano
CB	3	(Portugal) Pepe (c)
LB	22	(Brazil) Wendell	(red card) 62'
RW	25	(Portugal) Otávio	(yellow card) 25'	(substituted off) 90+3'
MF	8	(Colombia) Mateus Uribe	(yellow card) 72'
MF	46	(Canada) Stephen Eustáquio	(substituted off) 90+3'
LW	13	(Brazil) Galeno	(yellow card) 60'	(substituted off) 90+3'
RF	9	(Iran) Mehdi Taremi	(yellow card) 76'
CF	30	(Brazil) Evanilson	(substituted off) 44'
Substitutes:
GK	99	(Portugal) Diogo Costa
DF	17	(Portugal) Rodrigo Conceição	(yellow card) 66'
DF	2	(Portugal) Fábio Cardoso
LB	12	(Nigeria) Zaidu Sanusi	(substituted on) 67'
CM	16	(Serbia) Marko Grujić	(substituted on) 90+3'
FW	20	(Portugal) André Franco	(substituted on) 90+3'
FW	19	(England) Danny Namaso
FW	29	(Spain) Toni Martínez	(substituted on) 44'	(substituted off) 67'
FW	7	(Brazil) Gabriel Veron	(substituted on) 90+3'
Manager:
(Portugal) Sérgio Conceição

Man of the Match:
Otávio
Fair Player of the Match:
Ricardo Horta

Assistant referees:
Bruno Jesus
Luciano Maia
Fourth official:
Manuel Oliveira
Video assistant referee:
Nuno Almeida
Assistant video assistant referees:
Hélder Malheiro
André Campos

Match rules

- 90 minutes
- 30 minutes of extra time if necessary
- Penalty shoot-out if scores still level
- Seven named substitutes
- Maximum of five substitutions, with a sixth allowed in extra time (Note: Each team was given only three opportunities to make substitutions, with a fourth opportunity in extra time, excluding substitutions made at half-time, before the start of extra time and at half-time in extra time.)

== See also ==
- 2022–23 FC Porto season
- 2022–23 S.C. Braga season
- 2023 Taça da Liga final
