= 2023 Taça da Liga final =

- Event: 2022–23 Taça da Liga
Porto	Sporting CP
2	0
- Date: 28 January 2023
- Venue: Estádio Dr. Magalhães Pessoa, Leiria
- Referee: João Pinheiro
- Attendance: 19,263

The 2023 Taça da Liga final was the final match of the 2022–23 Taça da Liga, the sixteenth season of the Taça da Liga. It was played on 28 January 2023 at Estádio Dr. Magalhães Pessoa.

The competition involved the 34 clubs playing in the top two tiers of the Portuguese football league system – 18 from Primeira Liga and 16 from Liga Portugal 2 – during the 2022–23 season. Reserve sides of Primeira Liga teams that played in the 2020–21 Liga Portugal 2 were excluded from the competition. The competition format suffered changes in which all teams entered the competition in a single group stage, with matches beginning on 17 November 2022 and played during the 2022 FIFA World Cup.

Sporting CP were the holders and four-time winners, after defeating Benfica 2–1 in the 2022 final. They reached their third consecutive final but were defeated 2–0 by Porto, who secured their first title in the competition after losing four previous finals in 2010, 2013, 2019 and 2020.

== Background ==
The competition format suffered changes this season, due to the 2022 FIFA World Cup taking place during the same time as the tournament, a new format was adopted in which all teams entered the competition in a single group stage, with matches beginning on 17 November 2022. The eight group winners advanced to a knockout phase comprising quarter-finals, semi-finals and the final, which was played at the Estádio Dr. Magalhães Pessoa in Leiria on 28 January 2023.

== Route to the final ==
Note: In all results below, the score of the finalist is given first (H: home; A: away).

Porto			Round	Sporting CP		
Opponent	Result	Stadium	Group stage	Opponent	Result	Stadium
Mafra	2–2 (H)	Estádio do Dragão	Matchday 1	Farense	6–0 (H)	Estádio José Alvalade
Chaves	2–0 (A)	Estádio Municipal de Chaves	Matchday 2	Rio Ave	2–0 (A)	Estádio dos Arcos
Vizela	4–0 (H)	Estádio do Dragão	Matchday 3	Marítimo	5–0 (H)	Estádio José Alvalade
Group A winners: Team / Pld / W / D / L / GF / GA / GD / Pts; Porto / 3 / 2 / 1 / 0 / 8 / 2 / +6 / 7; Mafra / 3 / 1 / 2 / 0 / 5 / 4 / +1 / 5; Vizela / 3 / 0 / 2 / 1 / 3 / 7 / −4 / 2; Chaves / 3 / 0 / 1 / 2 / 3 / 6 / −3 / 1			Final standings	Group B winners: Team / Pld / W / D / L / GF / GA / GD / Pts; Sporting CP / 3 / 3 / 0 / 0 / 13 / 0 / +13 / 9; Rio Ave / 2 / 2 / 0 / 1 / 3 / 3 / +0 / 6; Farense / 3 / 1 / 0 / 2 / 3 / 8 / –5 / 3; Marítimo / 3 / 0 / 0 / 3 / 0 / 8 / –8 / 0		
Opponent	Result	Stadium	Knockout phase	Opponent	Result	Stadium
Gil Vicente	2–0 (H)	Estádio do Dragão	Quarter-finals	Braga	5–0 (H)	Estádio José Alvalade
Académico de Viseu	3–0 (N)	Estádio Dr. Magalhães Pessoa	Semi-finals	Arouca	2–1 (N)	Estádio Dr. Magalhães Pessoa

== Match ==
=== Details ===
28 January 2023
19:45

Sporting CP	0–2	Porto
	Report	Eustáquio 10'; Marcano 86'

Estádio Dr. Magalhães Pessoa, Leiria
Attendance: 19,263
Referee: João Pinheiro

Sporting	Porto

GK	1	(Spain) Antonio Adán
CB	4	(Uruguay) Sebastián Coates (c)	(substituted off) 80'
CB	52	(Portugal) Gonçalo Inácio	(yellow card) 90+6'
CB	2	(Brazil) Matheus Reis
RM	24	(Spain) Pedro Porro
CM	5	(Japan) Hidemasa Morita	(substituted off) 84'
CM	15	(Uruguay) Manuel Ugarte	(yellow card) 31'	(substituted off) 84'
LM	11	(Portugal) Nuno Santos	(substituted off) 56'
RW	28	(Portugal) Pedro Gonçalves	(yellow card) 67'
CF	21	(Portugal) Paulinho	(yellow card) 63'	(red card) 72'
LW	17	(England) Marcus Edwards	(substituted off) 80'
Substitutes:
GK	12	(Uruguay) Franco Israel
DF	47	(Portugal) Ricardo Esgaio
DF	3	(Netherlands) St. Juste	(substituted on) 80'
MF	32	(Argentina) Mateo Tanlongo	(substituted on) 84'
FW	17	(Portugal) Francisco Trincão	(substituted on) 80'
FW	79	(Portugal) Youssef Chermiti
FW	18	(Ghana) Abdul Fatawu Issahaku	(substituted on) 56'
FW	33	(Brazil) Arthur Gomes	(substituted on) 84'
FW	77	(Cape Verde) Jovane Cabral
Manager:
(Portugal) Ruben Amorim

GK	14	(Portugal) Cláudio Ramos
RB	23	(Portugal) João Mário
CB	5	(Spain) Iván Marcano
CB	3	(Portugal) Pepe (c)	(yellow card) 63'	(substituted off) 90+4'
LB	22	(Brazil) Wendell	(yellow card) 67'	(substituted off) 78'
RW	25	(Portugal) Otávio
MF	8	(Colombia) Mateus Uribe
MF	46	(Canada) Stephen Eustáquio	(substituted off) 88'
RW	11	(Brazil) Pepê	(substituted off) 88'
CF	9	(Iran) Mehdi Taremi	(substituted off) 90+4'
LW	13	(Brazil) Galeno
Substitutes:
GK	99	(Portugal) Diogo Costa
DF	17	(Portugal) Rodrigo Conceição
DF	2	(Portugal) Fábio Cardoso	(substituted on) 90+4'
DF	12	(Nigeria) Zaidu Sanusi	(substituted on) 78'
MF	87	(Portugal) Bernardo Folha	(substituted on) 88'
FW	70	(Portugal) Gonçalo Borges	(substituted on) 88'	(yellow card) 90+6'
FW	19	(England) Danny Namaso	(substituted on) 90+4'
FW	29	(Spain) Toni Martínez
FW	7	(Brazil) Gabriel Veron
Manager:
(Portugal) Sérgio Conceição

Assistant referees:
Rui Cidade
Nelson Pereira
Fourth official:
Cláudio Pereira
Video assistant referee:
Tiago Martins
Assistant video assistant referee:
Fábio Melo

Match rules

- 90 minutes.
- Penalty shoot-out if scores still level.
- Seven named substitutes.
- Maximum of three substitutions.

== See also ==
- FC Porto–Sporting CP rivalry
- 2022–23 FC Porto season
- 2022–23 Sporting CP season
- 2023 Taça de Portugal final
