= Lucas Macedo =

Brazilian footballer (born 2003)

Personal information
- Date of birth: 21 October 2003 (age 23)
- Place of birth: São Paulo, Brazil
- Height: 1.85 m (6 ft 1 in)
- Position: Forward

Team information
- Current team: Spartak Pleven (on loan from Guarani)
- Number: 23

Youth career
- –2022: Ponte Preta
- 2022–2023: Leixões

Senior career*
Years	Team	Apps	(Gls)
2023	Vasco da Gama Vidigueira	3	(0)
2024	Fratria	12	(5)
2024–2025	Karava Piraeus	8	(0)
2025–	Guarani	1	(0)
2025	→ Amora (loan)	6	(0)
2026	→ Oliveira do Hospital (loan)	7	(0)
2026–	→ Spartak Pleven (loan)	0	(0)
- * Club domestic league appearances and goals as of 21:45, 2 May 2026 (UTC)

Lucas Macedo (born 21 October 2003) is a Brazilian professional footballer who plays as a forward for Spartak Pleven, on loan from Guarani.

== Club career ==
In 2022, Macedo moved from Brazil to Portugal in order to move to European football. He was part of Leixões academy, until moving to Vasco da Gama Vidigueira. In January 2024, he joined Bulgarian Second League team Chernomorets Balchik on trials. Month later he was announced as the new signing of the Third League team Fratria. The team won promotion and Macedo scored five goals, but was released from the club in July 2024. He joined the Greek low division team Karava Piraeus. In February 2025, he spend a trials with Portuguese Belenenses and later returned to his home country and spend a trial with Guarani and in March joined the team officially. He made his professional debut for the team in a league match against Caxias on 29 April 2025.
