= Sérgio Santos (footballer, born 1998) =

Portuguese professional footballer

Personal information
- Full name: Sérgio Assis Capitango Fernando Santos
- Date of birth: October 2, 1998 (age 28)
- Place of birth: Lisbon, Portugal
- Height: 1.80 m (5 ft 11 in)
- Position: Forward

Team information
- Current team: Petro Luanda
- Number: 29

Youth career
- 2006–2007: Câmara
- 2007–2008: ADCEO
- 2008–2010: Benfica
- 2010–2014: Sacavenense
- 2014–2015: Sporting CP
- 2015–2016: Sacavenense

Senior career*
Years	Team	Apps	(Gls)
2016–2017	Loures	1	(0)
2017–2018	Penafiel	0	(0)
2017–2018	→Vila Real (loan)	16	(6)
2018–2021	Portimonense	0	(0)
2020–2021	→Alverca (loan)	16	(1)
2021–	Petro Luanda	0	(0)
- * Club domestic league appearances and goals as of 21:59, 18 October 2021 (UTC)

Sérgio Assis Capitango Fernando Santos (born 2 October 1998) is a Portuguese professional footballer who plays as a forward for Petro Luanda.

== Professional career ==
Santos made his professional debut with Portimonense in a 2-1 Taça da Liga win over Gil Vicente F.C. on 25 September 2019. Santos moved to Angola with Petro Luanda in August 2021.

== Personal life ==
Born in Portugal, Santos is of Angolan descent.
