= Tamble Monteiro =

Bissau-Guinean footballer (born 2000)

Personal information
- Full name: Tamble Ulisses Folgado Monteiro
- Date of birth: 15 November 2000 (age 25)
- Place of birth: Coimbra, Portugal
- Height: 1.91 m (6 ft 3 in)
- Position: Forward

Team information
- Current team: Rio Ave
- Number: 9

Youth career
- 2008–2009: GR Vigor Mocidade
- 2009–2017: Académica de Coimbra
- 2017–2020: UC Eirense

Senior career*
Years	Team	Apps	(Gls)
2020–2022	Anadia	44	(6)
2022–2023	São João de Ver	13	(1)
2023–2024	Felgueiras 1932	14	(9)
2024–2026	Portimonense	51	(18)
2026–	Rio Ave	13	(0)

International career^{‡}
2025–	Guinea-Bissau	8	(1)
- * Club domestic league appearances and goals as of 15 May 2026 ‡ National team caps and goals as of 18:27, 28 November 2025 (UTC)

Tamble Ulisses Folgado Monteiro (born 15 November 2000) is a professional footballer who plays as a forward for Rio Ave. Born in Portugal, he plays for the Guinea-Bissau national team.

== Club career ==
Tamble is a product of the youth academies of GR Vigor Mocidade, Académica de Coimbra and UC Eirense. He began his senior career in the Portuguese fourth division with Anadia in 2020, and helped them earn promotion to the Liga 3 in his debut season. For the 2022–23 season, he moved to São João de Ver in the same division where he was the top scorer of the 2022–23 Taça de Portugal with 6 goals. The following season he moved to Felgueiras 1932 again in the Liga 3 and was the top scorer in the league with 10 goals in his first 14 matches. This earned him a move with Primeira Liga side Portimonense on 4 January 2024, for the remainder of the 2023–24 season on a contract until 2028.

== International career ==
Born in Portugal, Tamble is of Bissau-Guinean descent. He was called up to the senior Guinea-Bissau national football team for a set of 2026 FIFA World Cup qualification matches in March 2025. He scored on his debut, a 3–1 loss to Liberia on 20 March 2025.

== Career statistics ==
As of match played 12 October 2025

Appearances and goals by national team and year
National team	Year	Apps	Goals
Guinea-Bissau	2025	8	1
Total		8	1

Scores and results list Guinea-Bissau's goal tally first, score column indicates score after each Monteiro goal.

List of international goals scored by Tamble Monteiro
No.	Date	Venue	Opponent	Score	Result	Competition	Ref.
1	20 March 2025	SKD Stadium, Paynesville, Liberia	Sierra Leone	1–3	1–2	2026 FIFA World Cup qualification	

== Honours ==
- 2022–23 Taça de Portugal top scorer
