= José Varela (footballer) =

Cape Verdean footballer

Personal information
- Full name: José Carlos Moreira Varela
- Date of birth: 15 September 1997 (age 29)
- Place of birth: Praia, Cape Verde
- Height: 1.68 m (5 ft 6 in)
- Position: Winger

Team information
- Current team: Cinfães
- Number: 14

Youth career
- 2012–2015: Real
- 2015–2016: Loures
- 2016–2018: Aves

Senior career*
Years	Team	Apps	(Gls)
2017–2020	Aves	13	(0)
2017–2018	→ Mirandela (loan)	22	(0)
2020–2021	Vilafranquense	6	(0)
2021	→ Leça (loan)	14	(2)
2021–2023	Vitória de Setúbal	26	(2)
2023	Persikabo 1973	17	(3)
2024	Alverca	14	(1)
2024–2025	Os Belenenses	20	(1)
2025–2026	Sintrense	26	(2)
2026–	Cinfães	3	(0)
- * Club domestic league appearances and goals as of 13 September 2026

José Carlos Moreira Varela (born 15 September 1997), commonly known as José Varela, is a Cape Verdean professional footballer who plays as a winger for Campeonato de Portugal club Cinfães.

== Career ==
Varela made his professional debut with Aves in a 2–0 Primeira Liga win over on 31 March 2019.

On 16 August 2021, he signed with Vitória de Setúbal.

On 5 June 2023, he officially joined the club Persikabo 1973 which competed in Indonesian Liga 1.
