= G.C.D. Vila Caiz =

Portuguese association football club

Vila Caiz
- Full name: Grupo Cultural Desportivo de Vila Caiz
- Short name: Vila Caiz
- Founded: 9 March 1978; 48 years ago
- Ground: Campo de Futebol de Vila Caiz
- League: AF Porto Liga Pro
- 2025–26: AF Porto Liga Pro, 9th

Grupo Cultural Desportivo de Vila Caiz, commonly known as G.C.D. Vila Caiz or simply Vila Caiz, is a Portuguese football club based in Vila Caiz, in the municipality of Amarante, Porto District. Founded on 9 March 1978, the club competes in competitions organised by the Porto Football Association (AF Porto).

Vila Caiz won the Taça AF Porto in the 2021–22 season, defeating São Lourenço do Douro in the final. The club reached the final again in 2022–23, finishing as runners-up to FC Foz. Vila Caiz has also participated in the Taça de Portugal, reaching the third round in the 2025–26 edition.

== History ==
Grupo Cultural Desportivo de Vila Caiz was founded on 9 March 1978. The club is based in Vila Caiz, a parish in the municipality of Amarante, in the Porto District of northern Portugal. Its registration and founding date are recorded in the club profile published by the Porto Football Association.

Vila Caiz won the Taça AF Porto for the first time in the 2021–22 season. The final was played on 26 June 2022 at the Estádio Dr. Machado de Matos in Felgueiras, with Vila Caiz facing São Lourenço do Douro. Vila Caiz won 4–2 to secure the trophy.

In the 2022–23 season, Vila Caiz reached the final for a second consecutive year. The club qualified after defeating Oliveira do Douro in the semi-finals and faced FC Foz in the final on 7 May 2023 at the Estádio Municipal das Laranjeiras in Paredes. FC Foz won the final, leaving Vila Caiz as runners-up.

Vila Caiz made its debut in the Taça de Portugal in the 2022–23 season after winning the previous edition of the Taça AF Porto. The club received a bye in the first round and entered the competition in the second round, where it faced Amora. Vila Caiz lost 3–1 after extra time on 2 October 2022 and was eliminated.

Vila Caiz returned to the Taça de Portugal in the 2025–26 season. In the first round, played on 31 August 2025, the club defeated CD Ribeira Brava 1–0. It progressed to the third round after beating Eléctrico FC 3–2 on 21 September. In the third round, Vila Caiz travelled to face fellow Amarante municipality club Vila Meã on 19 October 2025. Vila Meã won 1–0, eliminating Vila Caiz from the competition. The match was the first time two clubs from the municipality of Amarante had met in the third round of the Taça de Portugal.

== Honours ==
=== Regional competitions ===
- Taça AF Porto
  - Winners (1): 2021–22
  - Runners-up (1): 2022–23
