= Stephen Eustáquio =

Canadian soccer player (born 1996)

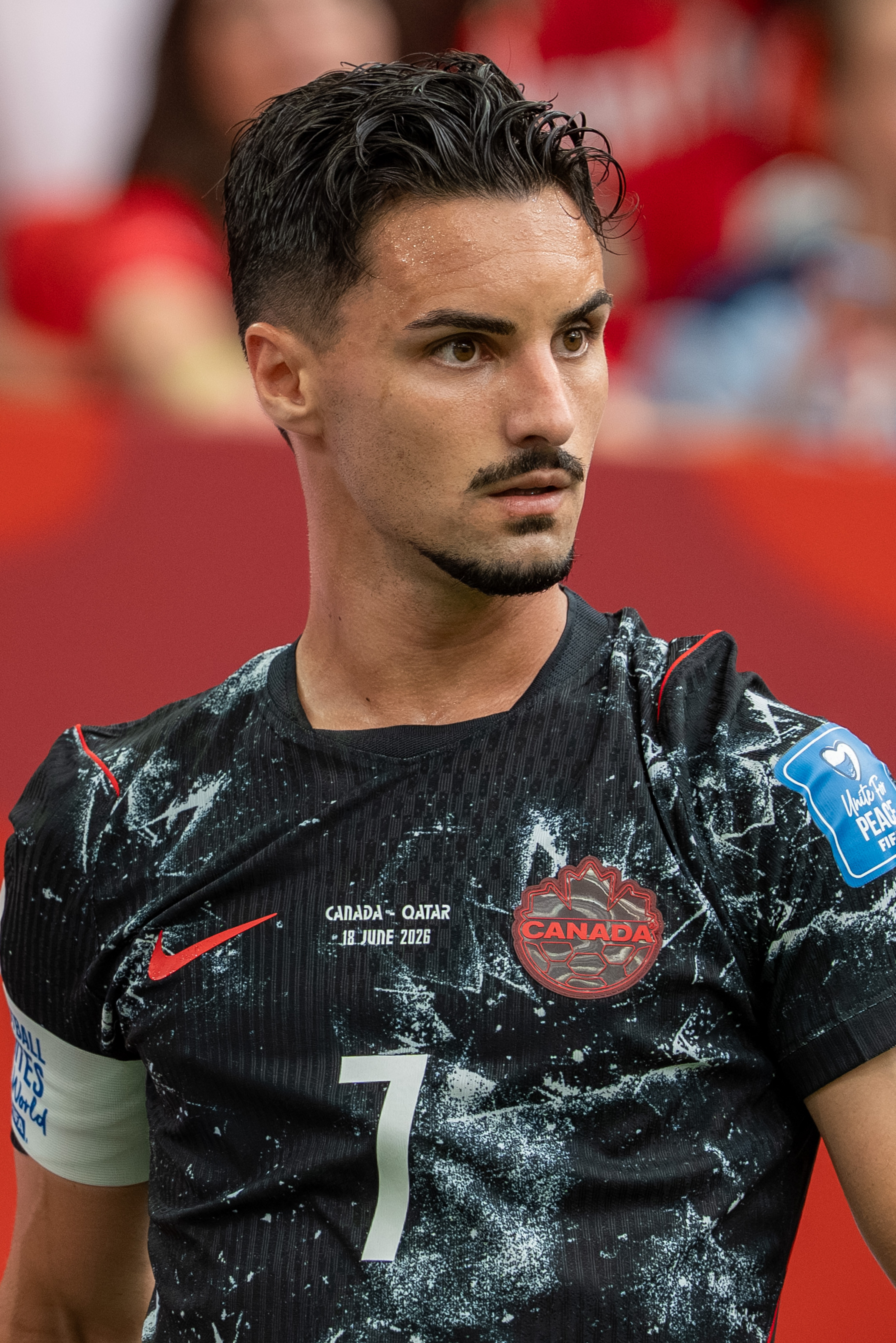
- Eustáquio with Canada in 2026

Personal information
- Full name: Stephen Antunes Eustáquio
- Date of birth: 21 December 1996 (age 29)
- Place of birth: Leamington, Ontario, Canada
- Height: 1.78 m (5 ft 10 in)
- Position: Midfielder

Team information
- Current team: Swansea City
- Number: 46

Youth career
- 2002–2004: Leamington MS
- 2005–2010: Nazarenos
- 2010–2013: União Leiria
- 2014–2015: Torreense

Senior career*
Years	Team	Apps	(Gls)
2013–2014	Nazarenos	17	(1)
2015–2017	Torreense	56	(0)
2017–2018	Leixões	20	(0)
2018–2019	Chaves	29	(1)
2019–2021	Cruz Azul	1	(0)
2020–2021	→ Paços Ferreira (loan)	31	(2)
2021–2022	Paços Ferreira	34	(0)
2022	→ Porto (loan)	8	(0)
2022–2026	Porto	96	(4)
2026	→ Los Angeles FC (loan)	10	(1)
2026–	Swansea City	9	(2)

International career^{‡}
2012	Canada U17		
2017–2018	Portugal U21	7	(0)
2019–	Canada	64	(5)
Medal record
Representing Canada
Men's soccer
CONCACAF Nations League
Runner-up	2023
- * Club domestic league appearances and goals as of 16:33, 31 October 2026 (UTC) ‡ National team caps and goals as of 6 October 2026

Stephen Antunes Eustáquio (Note: /ˈstɛfən/ STEF-ən) (born 21 December 1996) is a Canadian professional soccer player who plays as a midfielder for EFL Championship club Swansea City and vice-captains the Canada national team.

After starting out at Nazarenos, he has spent most of his club career in Portugal with Torreense, Leixões, Chaves, Paços de Ferreira and Porto. He also played briefly in Mexico with Cruz Azul.

Born in Canada, Eustáquio represented Portugal at youth level. However, in 2019 he committed to play for Canada and debuted for them in November of that year. He was part of their squad that reached the semi-finals of the 2021 CONCACAF Gold Cup, also being selected for two FIFA World Cups and the 2024 Copa América.

== Early life ==
Eustáquio was born in Leamington, Ontario, to Portuguese parents, Armando and Esmeralda, who had emigrated from the coastal town of Nazaré to work in the fishing industry in southwestern Ontario. He grew up in a footballing family alongside his older brother Mauro, first playing organized soccer with Leamington Minor Soccer and spending summers on local fields and travelling with their parents to nearby tournaments.

When Eustáquio was seven, the family returned to Nazaré. The move initially proved difficult as the brothers adjusted to a new school and improved their Portuguese, but they quickly integrated through football and became immersed in the town's strong football culture. In Portugal, he initially took up goalkeeping mainly because no other player wanted the position, and made the permanent switch to midfield after arriving late to a match one week, a change his coach chose to keep in place.

Eustáquio said Mauro was instrumental in his path through the Portuguese youth system, insisting that Stephen also be signed when he himself was scouted by União de Leiria. After struggling for time, the former appeared at semi-professional level with Nazarenos playing alongside older, adult opponents at his mother's suggestion, an experience he credited with improving his physicality and pace.

== Club career ==
=== Early career ===
After playing for Nazarenos in regional competition, Eustáquio moved to Torrense in 2015. He spent two seasons with the club in the third division, establishing himself as a central midfielder before earning a move to the Segunda Liga with Leixões.

=== Leixões ===
On 7 June 2017, Eustáquio signed with Leixões. On 23 July, he appeared in his first match as a professional in a 2–0 home win against Académico de Viseu in the first round of the Taça da Liga where he featured the full 90 minutes, and his debut in the second division was on 6 August in a 4–1 away loss to Real Massamá.

=== Chaves ===
Eustáquio joined Chaves on 31 January 2018, on a five-and-a-half-year deal after his buyout clause of €500,000 was paid. He made his Primeira Liga debut four days later, playing the entire 2–1 away victory over Feirense; he scored his first top-flight goal on 14 April, helping his team to come from behind to draw 3–3 at Boavista.

On 14 September 2018, in a Portuguese League Cup match at the Estádio do Dragão, Eustáquio scored a late equaliser which helped Chaves to draw 1–1 and record their first ever point at Porto's home ground.

=== Cruz Azul ===
Eustáquio moved to Cruz Azul of the Mexican Liga MX on 15 January 2019. Vítor Severino, who worked as assistant to manager Luís Castro at Chaves, described him as "like the typical player from La Masia, from Barcelona". On his debut, against Tijuana, he was sent off mere minutes after taking the field as a substitute, but eventually the video assistant referee cautioned him with only a yellow card upon review; shortly after, however, he was stretchered off with an injury.

After being sidelined for eight months, Eustáquio returned to the pitch on 22 September 2019, playing for the under-20 team in preparation for his full return. He said the lengthy injury layoff, while difficult, prompted him to take his fitness, nutrition and long-term physical conditioning more seriously than he previously had.

=== Paços de Ferreira ===
In December 2019, Eustáquio was loaned to Portuguese top-flight club Paços de Ferreira for the remainder of the season. He made his league debut on 11 January 2020, in a 0–0 away draw against Portimonense.

Eustáquio agreed to another loan in September 2020. The following January, the move was made permanent for a fee of €2.5 million. He scored his first goal for them on 24 October, closing the 1–1 league draw at Nacional, and six days later he added another in a 3–2 win over Porto at the Estádio da Mata Real.

On 10 April 2021, Eustáquio lasted only 22 minutes in a 5–0 home loss to Benfica, receiving a straight red card for a foul on Julian Weigl. He made his European debut on 5 August, and netted the third in the 4–0 home victory against Larne in the third qualifying round of the UEFA Europa Conference League.

=== Porto ===
In January 2022, Eustáquio was loaned to Porto for the rest of the season, with an option to buy. He played his first match on 6 February, replacing Fábio Vieira late into a 2–0 away defeat of Arouca.

On 31 May 2022, Porto exercised its purchase option, signing Eustáquio to a contract until 30 June 2027. Having become a starter for the Sérgio Conceição-led side, he scored his first goal on 30 September in the 4–1 home win over Braga. He added two more in the group stage of the UEFA Champions League to help his team to progress as group winners, at Club Brugge in a 4–0 victory and against Atlético Madrid in a 2–1 home win.

In Porto's run to winning the 2022–23 Taça da Liga, Eustáquio scored early opening goals in the 3–0 semi-final victory over Académico de Viseu and the 2–0 final against Sporting CP. On 15 April, he was informed at half-time of the home fixture against Santa Clara that his mother Esmeralda had died aged 51, and was replaced shortly after in an eventual 2–1 win.

Eustáquio joined Major League Soccer club Los Angeles FC on 6 February 2026, on a four-month loan that included a purchase option.

=== Swansea City ===
On 27 August 2026, Eustáquio signed a two-year deal with EFL Championship side Swansea City, for an undisclosed fee reported to be around £3.4 million.

== International career ==
=== Youth ===
Eligible to represent Canada and Portugal, Eustáquio appeared for Canada's under-17 side at the 2012 AGS Cup.

In November 2017, Portugal under-21 manager Rui Jorge selected him for 2019 UEFA European Championship qualifiers against Romania and Switzerland to be held early in that month. He won his first cap against the former, playing 90 minutes and being booked in the 1–1 draw in Constanța.

=== Senior ===
Eustáquio showed potential to qualify for the Portuguese national team, but chose to play for Canada as it would give him an opportunity to take a leadership role, and in February 2019 he committed to the latter at senior level. He said that the latter's head coach John Herdman had stayed in regular contact with him and made clear the interest after the player narrowly missed qualifying for the European Championship with the former's under-21 side, a gesture Eustáquio stated made him feel valued and factored into his decision to commit to Canada.

Upon his return from his knee injury, Eustáquio received his first call-up to the team on 1 October 2019 for a CONCACAF Nations League fixture against the United States. He made his debut on 15 November, coming from the bench for Mark-Anthony Kaye in the second half of the 4–1 away loss.

Eustáquio was named to a 60-man preliminary squad for the 2021 CONCACAF Gold Cup on 18 June, before making the final cut for the tournament. He scored his first international goal in the first group fixture on 11 July, a 4–1 win over Martinique in Kansas City, and added a direct free kick four days later to open a 4–1 defeat of Haiti at the same venue. Canada made the semi-finals, with him concluding the 2–0 victory against Costa Rica in the last eight.

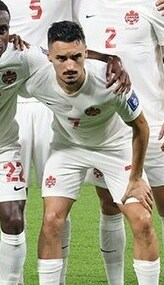
Eustáquio with Canada at the 2022 FIFA World Cup.

Eustáquio was called-up to the 2022 FIFA World Cup squad, playing two games in a group-stage elimination. In June 2023, he was selected for the 2023 CONCACAF Nations League Finals. Later that month, he made the final 23-man squad due to appear at the 2023 Gold Cup, but withdrew shortly before the start of the tournament.

On 20 March 2024, Eustáquio was named captain by head coach Mauro Biello for the Copa América qualifying play-offs against Trinidad and Tobago. In June, he was picked for the finals in the United States, being appointed vice-captain behind Alphonso Davies by manager Jesse Marsch.

Eustáquio was named in Canada's squad for the 2025 CONCACAF Gold Cup, but faced a scheduling conflict due to Porto's participation in the 2025 FIFA Club World Cup. He made his 50th international appearance on 7 June that year, skippering his team in a 4–2 victory against Ukraine in the Canadian Shield.

On 28 May, Eustáquio was selected for the 2026 World Cup. As Davies was ruled out of Canada's group-stage games due to injury, he served as captain in his absence. In their first knockout round match ever, on 28 June, he scored the winning goal in the second minute of added time against South Africa.

== Personal life ==
Eustáquio has both Canadian and Portuguese citizenship. His older brother, Mauro, was a professional player who represented Canada at under-20 and under-23 levels.

In April 2024, one year after the death of Eustáquio's mother from brain cancer, his father Armando died of a heart attack. As of 2026, he is engaged to Portuguese fashion designer Constança Damião, with whom he shares a daughter.

== Career statistics ==
=== Club ===
As of match played 31 October 2026

Appearances and goals by club, season and competition
Club	Season	League			National cup (Note: Includes Taça de Portugal, Copa MX)		League cup (Note: Includes Taça da Liga)		Continental		Other		Total	
Club	Season	Division	Apps	Goals	Apps	Goals	Apps	Goals	Apps	Goals	Apps	Goals	Apps	Goals
Torreense	2014–15	Campeonato de Portugal	1	0	0	0	—		—		—		1	0
Torreense	2015–16	Campeonato de Portugal	24	0	1	0	—		—		—		25	0
Torreense	2016–17	Campeonato de Portugal	31	0	5	0	—		—		—		36	0
Torreense	Total		56	0	6	0	—		—		—		62	0
Leixões	2017–18	LigaPro	20	0	2	0	4	0	—		—		26	0
Chaves	2017–18	Primeira Liga	13	1	0	0	0	0	—		—		13	1
Chaves	2018–19	Primeira Liga	16	0	3	0	3	1	—		—		22	1
Chaves	Total		29	1	3	0	3	1	—		—		35	2
Cruz Azul	2018–19	Liga MX	1	0	1	0	—		—		—		2	0
Paços de Ferreira (loan)	2019–20	Primeira Liga	16	0	1	0	0	0	—		—		17	0
Paços de Ferreira	2020–21 (Note: Part of this season was spent on loan from Cruz Azul)	Primeira Liga	32	2	2	0	1	0	—		—		35	2
Paços de Ferreira	2021–22	Primeira Liga	17	0	0	0	1	0	4 (Note: Appearances in UEFA Europa Conference League)	1	—		22	1
Paços de Ferreira	Total		65	2	3	0	2	0	4	1	—		74	3
Porto (loan)	2021–22	Primeira Liga	8	0	1	0	0	0	2 (Note: Appearances in UEFA Europa League)	0	—		11	0
Porto	2022–23	Primeira Liga	29	2	5	1	2	2	7 (Note: Appearances in UEFA Champions League)	2	1 (Note: Appearance in Supertaça Cândido de Oliveira)	0	44	7
Porto	2023–24	Primeira Liga	28	2	2	0	1	0	8	1	1	0	40	3
Porto	2024–25	Primeira Liga	30	0	1	0	2	1	8	1	4 (Note: One appearance in Supertaça Cândido de Oliveira, three appearances in FIFA Club World Cup)	0	45	2
Porto	2025–26	Primeira Liga	8	0	3	0	1	0	4	0	—		16	0
Porto	2026–27	Primeira Liga	1	0	—		—		—		—		1	0
Porto	Porto total		104	4	12	1	6	3	29	4	6	0	157	12
Los Angeles FC (loan)	2026	Major League Soccer	10	1	—		—		4 (Note: Appearances in CONCACAF Champions Cup)	0	—		14	1
Swansea City	2026–27	Championship	9	2	0	0	—		—		0	0	9	2
Career total			294	10	27	1	15	4	37	5	6	0	379	20

=== International ===
As of match played 6 October 2026

Appearances and goals by national team and year
National team	Year	Apps	Goals
Canada	2019	1	0
Canada	2021	17	3
Canada	2022	10	0
Canada	2023	6	1
Canada	2024	13	0
Canada	2025	7	0
Canada	2026	10	1
Total		64	5

As of match played 28 June 2026
Scores and results list Canada's goal tally first, score column indicates score after each Eustáquio goal.

List of international goals scored by Stephen Eustáquio
No.	Date	Venue	Opponent	Score	Result	Competition
1	11 July 2021	Children's Mercy Park, Kansas City, United States	Martinique	3–1	4–1	2021 CONCACAF Gold Cup
2	15 July 2021	Children's Mercy Park, Kansas City, United States	Haiti	1–0	4–1	2021 CONCACAF Gold Cup
3	25 July 2021	AT&T Stadium, Arlington, United States	Costa Rica	2–0	2–0	2021 CONCACAF Gold Cup
4	18 November 2023	Independence Park, Kingston, Jamaica	Jamaica	2–1	2–1	2023–24 CONCACAF Nations League A
5	28 June 2026	SoFi Stadium, Inglewood, United States	South Africa	1–0	1–0	2026 FIFA World Cup

== Honours ==
Porto

- Primeira Liga: 2021–22, 2025–26
- Taça de Portugal: 2021–22, 2022–23, 2023–24
- Taça da Liga: 2022–23
- Supertaça Cândido de Oliveira: 2022, 2024, 2026

Canada

- CONCACAF Nations League runner up: 2023

Individual

- Primeira Liga Midfielder of the Month: September 2022
- Canada Soccer Player of the Year: 2023
