= Rodrigo Borges =

Portuguese footballer (born 1998)

Personal information
- Full name: Rodrigo da Rocha Borges
- Date of birth: 5 August 1998 (age 28)
- Place of birth: Braga, Portugal
- Height: 1.88 m (6 ft 2 in)
- Position: Centre-back

Team information
- Current team: Farense
- Number: 5

Youth career
- 2007–2009: EF Fernando Pires
- 2009–2011: Vitória Guimarães
- 2011–2012: Os Sandinenses
- 2012–2013: Vitória Guimarães
- 2013–2017: Benfica B

Senior career*
Years	Team	Apps	(Gls)
2017–2018	Merelinense	18	(3)
2018–2022	Braga B	56	(2)
2022–2023	Oliveirense	31	(2)
2023–2024	Torreense	5	(0)
2024–2026	Marítimo	52	(6)
2026–	Farense	1	(0)
- * Club domestic league appearances and goals as of 30 August 2026

Rodrigo da Rocha Borges (born 5 August 1998) is a Portuguese professional footballer who plays as a centre-back for Liga Portugal 2 club Farense.

== Career ==
On 23 January 2024, Borges left Torreense and signed a two-and-a-half-year contract with fellow Liga Portugal 2 club Marítimo.
