= Jaime Poulson =

Portuguese footballer

Personal information
- Full name: Jaime Filipe Machado Poulson
- Date of birth: 22 June 1989 (age 37)
- Place of birth: Paredes, Portugal
- Height: 1.84 m (6 ft 1/2 in)
- Position: Forward

Youth career
- 1997−1998: Paredes
- 1998−2003: Penafiel
- 2003−2004: Boavista
- 2004−2005: Pasteleira
- 2005−2008: Boavista

Senior career*
Years	Team	Apps	(Gls)
2008−2010	Espinho	37	(1)
2010−2011	Paredes	29	(12)
2011−2012	Varzim	33	(10)
2012−2014	Paços Ferreira	10	(0)
2013−2014	→ Aves (loan)	32	(2)
2015	Kabuscorp	18	(1)
2016	Interclube		
2017	Sagrada Esperança		
2017−2018	Famalicão	30	(5)
2018−2019	Espinho	30	(10)
2019−2022	Lusitânia	72	(15)
2022−2023	São João Ver	23	(3)
2023−2024	Florgrade	24	(1)
2024−2025	Paredes	23	(2)
- * Club domestic league appearances and goals as of 19:14, 1 June 2025 (UTC)

Jaime Filipe Machado Poulson (born 22 June 1989) is a Portuguese footballer who plays as a forward.

== Club career ==
Born in Paredes, Porto District, Poulson was on the books of Boavista F.C. as a youth before starting his senior career in the lower leagues with S.C. Espinho and U.S.C. Paredes. In 2011, he signed for Varzim S.C. and won the third-division title in his only season before signing a three-year deal with F.C. Paços de Ferreira of the Primeira Liga on 3 July 2012.

Poulson spent the 2013–14 campaign on loan to C.D. Aves in the Segunda Liga. On 5 January 2014, he scored both goals as they won 2–1 at his parent club in the fifth round of the Taça de Portugal. He rescinded his contract with Paços on 10 December 2014, after 15 goalless appearances.

On 5 January 2015, Poulson joined Kabuscorp S.C.P. in Angola. He spent the next two years also in the Girabola, with G.D. Interclube and G.D. Sagrada Esperança.

Poulson returned home on 9 June 2017, signing with second-tier F.C. Famalicão for a year. He recorded his best professional figures of five goals in that season, including two in a 3–2 home victory over C.D. Nacional on 4 February 2018.
