= Iván Marcano =

Spanish footballer

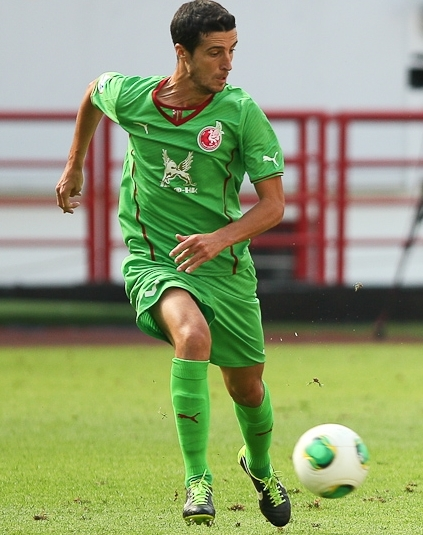
- Marcano with Rubin Kazan in 2013

Personal information
- Full name: Iván Marcano Sierra
- Date of birth: 23 June 1987 (age 39)
- Place of birth: Santander, Spain
- Height: 1.89 m (6 ft 2 in)
- Position: Centre-back

Youth career
- 1997–2005: Racing Santander

Senior career*
Years	Team	Apps	(Gls)
2005–2007	Racing B	42	(0)
2007–2009	Racing Santander	36	(2)
2009–2012	Villarreal	16	(1)
2010–2011	→ Getafe (loan)	29	(1)
2011–2012	→ Olympiacos (loan)	28	(4)
2012–2014	Rubin Kazan	38	(1)
2014	→ Olympiacos (loan)	7	(1)
2014–2018	Porto	104	(11)
2018–2019	Roma	10	(0)
2019–2025	Porto	73	(13)
2021	Porto B	2	(0)
Total		385	(34)

International career
2009	Spain U21	1	(0)
- * Club domestic league appearances and goals

Iván Marcano Sierra (Spanish pronunciation: [iˈβam maɾˈkano]; (Note: In isolation, Iván is pronounced [iˈβan].) born 23 June 1987) is a Spanish former professional footballer who played as a central defender.

After starting out at Racing de Santander and appearing for the club in La Liga, he went on to spend the better part of his career with Porto, playing 268 competitive matches and winning the 2017–18, 2019–20 and 2021–22 Primeira Liga championships. He also had spells abroad in Greece (Olympiacos, twice), Russia and Italy.

Marcano represented Spain at under-21 level.

== Club career ==
=== Racing ===
Santander-born Marcano, a youth graduate of hometown's Racing de Santander, made his first appearance with the main squad in an away win over Almería on 30 September 2007, due to injuries in the Cantabrian side. However, he had to leave the pitch in the second half of the game, also due to injury, and was unable to play for three months.

For the 2008–09 campaign, Marcano was definitely promoted to the first team under new manager Juan Ramón López Muñiz. He scored his first La Liga goal in the fifth match, a 2–1 home loss against Mallorca, and was a regular throughout the campaign, mostly as a left-back.

=== Villarreal ===
Marcano signed a six-year deal with Villarreal in early July 2009. He was first-choice for most of the first part of his first season; however, after consecutive poor performances, he fell out of favour, even losing his position in the defensive pecking order to 19-year-old Argentine Mateo Musacchio (originally signed for the B side). His one goal was on 4 May 2010 in a 4–2 loss at Almería.

Deemed surplus to requirements at Villarreal for 2010–11, Marcano was loaned to Getafe on 8 June 2010. Benefitting from injuries to both Mario and Rafa, he was regularly used in both defensive positions as the Madrid outskirts team narrowly avoided relegation; he netted his only goal of the season on 24 October 2010, in a 3–0 home win over Sporting de Gijón. The following 20 February, on Racing's visit to the Coliseum Alfonso Pérez, he was sent off for a foul on Giovani dos Santos from which Pablo Pinillos scored the only goal from the penalty spot with three minutes remaining.

=== Olympiacos and Rubin ===
On 2 June 2012, after one season with Olympiacos in Greece, where he played alongside several of his compatriots – including manager Ernesto Valverde – to win a double, Marcano was sold by Villarreal to Rubin Kazan in the Russian Premier League, for about €5 million. On 14 July, he made his debut in the Super Cup as a second-half substitute in a 2–0 victory against Zenit Saint Petersburg, with his team being captained by fellow Spaniard César Navas. He played 11 times in a quarter-final run in the UEFA Europa League, heading home in a 3–2 home win over Chelsea who went through 5–4 on aggregate.

In the 2014 winter transfer window, Marcano returned to his previous club on loan until June and with the option to subsequently make the deal permanent.

=== Porto ===
Marcano signed a four-year contract with Porto on 11 August 2014, replacing Manchester City-bound Eliaquim Mangala. He became the sixth Spaniard to join the Portuguese club after compatriot Julen Lopetegui took over three months earlier.

On 21 April 2015, Marcano was sent off for a second yellow card as Porto lost 6–1 away to Bayern Munich in the quarter-finals of the UEFA Champions League, being eliminated from the tournament despite having won the first leg. He scored four goals in his third season – five in all competitions– but his team could only finish third.

On 6 November 2016, after several occasions on which he wore the armband after the titular was replaced, Marcano acted as captain for the first time as a starter, in a 1–1 home draw against Benfica. He scored his first Champions League goal on 17 October 2017, closing the 3–2 group-stage away defeat to RB Leipzig just before half-time. In addition, he netted a career-best five times in the domestic league in the 2017–18 campaign, which ended with the conquest of the Primeira Liga championship after five years.

=== Roma ===
Marcano moved to the Italian Serie A on 31 May 2018, with the 30-year-old agreeing to a three-year deal at Roma. He made his league debut on 31 August, playing the first half of the 2–1 away loss to AC Milan.

During his spell at the Stadio Olimpico, Marcano appeared in only 13 competitive matches, with Federico Fazio, Kostas Manolas and Juan Jesus playing more frequently in central defence. He scored his only goal in the last 16 of the Coppa Italia in a 4–0 home win against Virtus Entella of Serie C on 14 January 2019.

=== Return to Porto ===
Marcano returned to former club Porto on 11 July 2019, again being given the number 5 jersey and signing a four-year contract. He contributed five goals in the first season in his second spell, winning another domestic league.

Marcano spent the better part of the 2020–21 campaign on the sidelines, nursing an anterior cruciate ligament injury. He made a comeback in late February, playing for the reserve team in Liga Portugal 2, but after two games he was ruled out again with a muscular problem.

Following a foot operation in November 2021, Marcano did not return until the 2022 Supertaça Cândido de Oliveira, playing in the 3–0 win over Tondela on 30 July in place of suspended new signing David Carmo. The following 28 January, he scored to conclude a 2–0 defeat of Sporting CP in the final of the Taça da Liga.

On 26 April 2023, Marcano's 16th-minute header opened an eventual 2–1 victory at Famalicão in the first leg of the semi-finals of the Taça de Portugal; in the process, he became Porto's all-time scorer from a defensive position at 27 goals. On 15 September, he suffered another ACL injury in the first half of the league fixture against Estrela da Amadora and was sidelined for 17 months.

Marcano left the Estádio do Dragão on 2 July 2025 at age 38, after his contract expired. Later that day, he announced his retirement.

== International career ==
Marcano was part of Juan Ramón López Caro's squad for the 2009 UEFA European Under-21 Championship in Sweden. He featured in the 2–0 win over Finland, in a group-stage exit.

== Personal life ==
Marcano's older brother, Alejandro (born 1983), was also a footballer. A goalkeeper, he competed solely in the lower leagues.

== Career statistics ==
As of match played 23 June 2025

Appearances and goals by club, season and competition
Club	Season	League			National cup (Note: Includes Copa del Rey, Greek Football Cup, Russian Cup, Taça de Portugal, Coppa Italia)		League cup (Note: Includes Taça da Liga)		Europe		Other		Total	
Club	Season	Division	Apps	Goals	Apps	Goals	Apps	Goals	Apps	Goals	Apps	Goals	Apps	Goals
Racing B	2005–06	Segunda División B	10	0	–		–		–		–		10	0
Racing B	2006–07	Segunda División B	32	0	–		–		–		–		32	0
Racing B	Total		42	0	–		–		–		–		42	0
Racing Santander	2007–08	La Liga	2	0	2	0	–		–		–		4	0
Racing Santander	2008–09	La Liga	34	2	2	0	–		5 (Note: Appearances in UEFA Cup)	0	–		41	2
Racing Santander	Total		36	2	4	0	–		5	0	–		45	2
Villarreal	2009–10	La Liga	16	1	4	0	–		7 (Note: Appearances in UEFA Europa League)	0	–		27	1
Getafe (loan)	2010–11	La Liga	29	1	4	0	–		5	0	–		38	1
Olympiacos (loan)	2011–12	Super League Greece	28	4	4	0	–		9 (Note: Five appearances in UEFA Champions League, four appearances and one goal in UEFA Europa League)	1	–		41	5
Rubin Kazan	2012–13	Russian Premier League	21	1	1	0	–		10	1	1 (Note: Appearance in Russian Super Cup)	0	33	2
Rubin Kazan	2013–14	Russian Premier League	17	0	0	0	–		11	1	–		28	1
Rubin Kazan	Total		38	1	1	0	–		21	2	1	0	61	3
Olympiacos (loan)	2013–14	Super League Greece	7	1	3	0	–		2 (Note: Appearances in UEFA Champions League)	0	–		12	1
Porto	2014–15	Primeira Liga	20	0	1	0	5	0	6	0	–		32	0
Porto	2015–16	Primeira Liga	22	2	4	0	1	0	6 (Note: Five appearances in UEFA Champions League, one appearance in UEFA Europa League)	0	–		33	2
Porto	2016–17	Primeira Liga	32	4	2	0	2	1	10	0	–		46	5
Porto	2017–18	Primeira Liga	30	5	5	1	4	0	7	1	–		46	7
Porto	Total		104	11	12	1	12	1	29	1	–		157	14
Roma	2018–19	Serie A	10	0	1	1	–		2	0	–		13	1
Porto B	2020–21	Liga Portugal 2	2	0	–		–		–		–		2	0
Porto	2019–20	Primeira Liga	23	5	1	1	3	0	10 (Note: Two appearances in UEFA Champions League, eight appearances in UEFA Europa League)	0	–		37	6
Porto	2020–21	Primeira Liga	1	0	0	0	0	0	0	0	0	0	1	0
Porto	2021–22	Primeira Liga	8	1	1	0	1	0	2	0	–		12	1
Porto	2022–23	Primeira Liga	25	4	6	2	6	1	3	0	1 (Note: Appearance in Supertaça Cândido de Oliveira)	0	41	7
Porto	2023–24	Primeira Liga	5	2	0	0	0	0	0	0	1	0	6	2
Porto	2024–25	Primeira Liga	11	1	0	0	0	0	0	0	3 (Note: Appearances in FIFA Club World Cup)	0	14	1
Porto	Total		73	13	8	3	10	1	15	0	5	0	111	17
Career total			385	34	41	5	22	2	95	4	6	0	549	45

== Honours ==
Olympiacos

- Super League Greece: 2011–12, 2013–14
- Greek Football Cup: 2011–12

Rubin Kazan

- Russian Super Cup: 2012

Porto

- Primeira Liga: 2017–18, 2019–20, 2021–22
- Taça de Portugal: 2019–20, 2021–22, 2022–23
- Taça da Liga: 2022–23
- Supertaça Cândido de Oliveira: 2022

Individual

- Primeira Liga Defender of the Month: August 2023
