= S.C. Pinheiro de Loures =

Portuguese football club

Pinheiro de Loures
- Full name: Sporting Clube Pinheiro de Loures
- Founded: 1952
- Ground: Major Rosa Bastos, Loures, Lisbon, Portugal
- Capacity: 1,500
- Chairman: João Marques
- Manager: Hélder Días
- League: AF Lisboa Divisão de Honra
- Website: https://pt-br.facebook.com/Sporting-Clube-Pinheiro-de-Loures-151594691553341/
Home colours	Away colours

S.C. Pinheiro de Loures is a Portuguese football club from the municipality of Loures, Lisbon. It was founded in 1952 and currently plays in the AF Lisboa Divisão de Honra, the fifth tier of the Portuguese football league.

== Current squad ==
Note: Flags indicate national team as defined under FIFA eligibility rules; some limited exceptions apply. Players may hold more than one non-FIFA nationality.

No.	Pos.	Nation	Player
—	GK	POR	Golfinho
—	GK	POR	Luis Cabral
—	DF	POR	Daniel Pendão
—	DF	POR	Ricky
—	DF	POR	Ricardo Costa
—	DF	POR	Oliverio Ribeiro
—	DF	POR	Marcelo Rodrigues
—	DF	POR	Maksym Morozov
—	DF	POR	Jorge Pereira
—	DF	POR	João Costa
—	DF	POR	Gonçalo Marques

No.	Pos.	Nation	Player
—	DF	POR	Guilherme Costa
—	MF	POR	Bruno Rodrigues
—	MF	CPV	Pelé
—	FW	POR	Rodrigo Anjos
—	FW	POR	Páulo Lourenço
—	FW	POR	José Resende
—	FW	POR	Nelson Pereira
—	FW	POR	João Mendes
—	FW	POR	Jota
—	FW	BRA	Júlio Pereira
—	FW	POR	Yuri Gouveia
