= C.F. Os Marialvas =

Portuguese sports club

- Full name: Clube Futebol Os Marialvas
- Founded: 1931
- Ground: Complexo Desportivo de Cantanhede
- Capacity: ≈600
- League: Honra B AF Coimbra
- 2020–21: 2nd

Clube Futebol Os Marialvas is a Portuguese sports club from Cantanhede.

The men's football team plays in the Honra B AF Coimbra. The team played on the second tier of Portuguese football until the 1989–90 Segunda Divisão, then the 1990–91 Segunda Divisão B followed by a stint in the Terceira Divisão until 1998–99. Another stint in the Terceira Divisão was confined to the 2005–06 edition. In the Taça de Portugal, Marialvas among others reached the fourth round in the 1992–93 edition.

== Notable players ==
- (Albania) Eduard Abazi
