= ACDR Lamelas =

- Full name: Associação Cultural Desportivo e Recreativo de Lamelas
- Founded: 2 May 1977; 49 years ago
- Ground: Campo Padre José Tavares
- Capacity: 400
- League: Viseu FA Divisão Honra
- 2025–26: 2nd

Associação Cultural Desportivo e Recreativo de Lamelas is a Portuguese football club from the village of Lamelas in Castro Daire. Founded in 1977, the club plays in the Viseu Football Association's Divisão Honra, in the fifth tier of the Portuguese football league system.

== History ==
On 22 December 2022, Lamelas won the Viseu Football Association's Supertaça for the first time, coming from behind to defeat Mortágua 2–1. With local one-cap Portugal international forward Licá in the team, the club won the district league with one game remaining on 7 May 2023, after a 4–0 home win over Penalva do Castelo.

Lamelas retained the local super cup on 20 December 2023 with a 1–0 win over Cinfães. After one season in the fourth-tier Campeonato de Portugal, the club was relegated back to the district leagues. On 23 May 2026, they won the district cup 2–1 against neighbours Castro Daire, with the winning goal in the last minute of extra time. The club reached the third round of the Taça de Portugal in 2026–27, losing at home on 17 October to Primeira Liga club Vitória de Guimarães by a single goal from Miguel Maga.
