= Dudu (footballer, born August 1999) =

Brazilian footballer

Personal information
- Full name: Luiz Eduardo Teodora da Silva
- Date of birth: 10 August 1999 (age 27)
- Place of birth: Campinas, Brazil
- Height: 1.79 m (5 ft 10 in)
- Position: Forward

Team information
- Current team: Sport Recife
- Number: 77

Youth career
- –2017: Inter de Limeira
- 2017–2018: Fluminense

Senior career*
Years	Team	Apps	(Gls)
2018	Fluminense	5	(1)
2019–2020	Ponte Preta	0	(0)
2020–2021	Marinhense	8	(7)
2021–2025	Nacional	117	(14)
2025–2026	Mazatlán	29	(1)
2026–	Sport Recife	9	(0)
- * Club domestic league appearances and goals as of 16 November 2026

Luiz Eduardo Teodora da Silva (born 10 August 1999), commonly known as Dudu, is a Brazilian professional footballer who plays as a forward for Sport Recife.

== Career ==
On 1 February 2021, he signed a four-and-a-half-year contract with Nacional in Portugal.

== Career statistics ==
As of 5 July 2019

Appearances and goals by club, season and competition
Club	Season	League			State League		Cup		Continental		Other		Total	
Club	Season	Division	Apps	Goals	Apps	Goals	Apps	Goals	Apps	Goals	Apps	Goals	Apps	Goals
Fluminense	2018	Série A	1	0	4 (Note: Appearances in the Campeonato Carioca)	1	2 (Note: Appearances in the Copa do Brasil)	0	–		0	0	7	1
Career total			1	0	4	1	2	0	0	0	0	0	7	1
