= Pepe (footballer, born October 1983) =

Brazilian footballer (born 1983)

Personal information
- Full name: Marcos Paulo Aguiar de Jesus
- Date of birth: 4 October 1983 (age 43)
- Place of birth: São Simão, Brazil
- Height: 1.83 m (6 ft 0 in)
- Position: Forward

Senior career*
Years	Team	Apps	(Gls)
2001	Mogi Mirim		
2002	Brasil de Farroupilha		
2003	Primavera		
2004	Campinas		
2004	Fernandópolis		
2005	Linense		
2005	Cidade Azul		
2006	Primavera		
2006	Guaçuano		
2006–2008	Bidvest Wits		(13)
2009	Alki Larnaca	9	(2)
2009–2013	Enosis Neon Paralimni		
2013–2014	Genus		
- * Club domestic league appearances and goals

Marcos Paulo Aguiar de Jesus (born 4 October 1983), better known as Pepe, is a Brazilian former professional footballer who played as a forward for Bidvest Wits in the South African Premiership, among other clubs.

== Career ==
Born in São Simão, São Paulo state, Pepe started his professional career with Mogi Mirim, then played for teams in São Paulo state as well as for Brasil de Farroupilha and Cidade Azul. He joined Linense in March 2005, a Campeonato Paulista Segunda Divisão club (São Paulo state fourth level). In August 2005 he left for Cidade Azul, playing in the Campeonato Catarinense Série B1 (Santa Catarina third level).

In January 2006 he signed for Primavera of Campeonato Paulista Série A3. in April he moved to Guaçuano of Campeonato Paulista Segunda Divisão.

Pepe joined South African Premiership (PSL) team Bidvest Wits in August 2006, for whom he signed after playing for a Brazilian team against the club's under-23 team. In September he scored twice in Wits' 2–1 win against Kaizer Chiefs. In October he scored the decisive goal in a 1–0 defeat of Lamontville Golden Arrows. By mid-season Pepe was credited with greatly contributing to Wits' third place in the table along with compatriot Danilo Julio, with The Namibian labelling him "arguably the buy of the season". In April 2007 it was reported he would miss the rest of the season, after sustaining a serious injury requiring surgery. He scored eight league goals the 2006–07 season. He was nominated as PSL Club Rookie of the Year, with Clifford Ngobeni winning the award in August 2007.

Pepe scored five times in the 2007–08 season. In 2015 he was placed 29th in Kick Off's list of "top 30 foreign strikers to have played in the PSL".

In January 2009 Pepe signed for Cypriot team Alki Larnaca, where he scored twice in eight appearances. In June, after the club was relegated, he signed a preliminary one-year contract with the option of a further year with Enosis Neon Paralimni, pending the approval of manager Čedomir Janevski, with the contract being due to be activated in August. He was released in August, after pre-season training.

Pepe played in Vietnam before ending his career in his native Brazil.

== Style of play ==
In October 2006, during his spell at Wits University, Pepe was described as "powerfully built", being a strong header of the ball and having a "lethal right foot".

== Later life ==
After his retirement from playing, Pepe worked as a security guard.
