= F.C. Serpa =

Portuguese association football club

Serpa
- Full name: Futebol Clube de Serpa
- Short name: FC Serpa
- Founded: 2 December 1938; 87 years ago
- Ground: Campo Manuel Baião, Serpa
- League: Campeonato de Portugal

Futebol Clube de Serpa, commonly known as FC Serpa or simply Serpa, is a Portuguese football club based in Serpa, Beja District, in the Alentejo region. The club competes in the Campeonato de Portugal, the fourth tier of the Portuguese football league system. Its home matches are played at Campo Manuel Baião in Serpa.

Founded on 2 December 1938, FC Serpa developed through the competitions organised by the Beja Football Association before establishing itself in national football. The club's most significant historical achievement came in the 1956–57 season, when it won the Terceira Divisão championship. Serpa defeated SC Vila Real in the final, played in Coimbra, with goals from Teixeira da Silva and Coureles. The team was coached by Fabian and operated under the presidency of João Diogo Cano during this successful period.

After an extended absence from national competitions, Serpa returned to the national level in 2021, entering the Campeonato de Portugal for the first time in the club's history under that competition's name. The club subsequently featured in the competition's 2022–23 and 2023–24 seasons, including Portuguese Cup campaigns against higher-division opposition. In November 2023, Serpa faced Primeira Liga side Gil Vicente in the Taça de Portugal, losing narrowly 0-1.

== Honours ==
=== National competitions ===
- Terceira Divisão (third tier)
  - Winners (1): 1956–57

=== Regional competitions ===
- AF Beja – 1.ª Divisão
  - Winners (8): 1947–48, 1956–57, 1970–71, 1976–77, 1980–81, 1993–94, 1997–98, 2005–06
- AF Beja Cup
  - Winners (3): 1996–97, 2000–01, 2011–12
