= C.F. Vasco da Gama Vidigueira =

Association football club in Portugal

Vasco da Gama Vidigueira
- Full name: Clube de Futebol Vasco da Gama Vidigueira
- Founded: 10 January 1945; 81 years ago
- Ground: Estádio Municipal de Vidigueira, Rua José António Guerreiro Pinto, Vidigueira
- Capacity: 2,000
- Chairman: Júlio Azevedo
- Manager: Ricardo Vargas
- League: Campeonato de Portugal
- 2023-24: 12° - Grupo D
- Website: http://www.clubefutebolvascogama.pt//
Home colours	Away colours

Clube de Futebol Vasco da Gama Vidigueira, commonly known as Vasco da Gama Vidigueira, is a Portuguese sports club from Vidigueira, Beja. The club was founded on 10 January 1945. It currently plays at the Estádio Municipal de Vidigueira, which also hosts to the club's reserve and youth teams.

Their best campaign in the Taça de Portugal was reaching the third phase, which they did 2 times, in 2003-04 and 2017–18.

== Current squad ==
Note: Flags indicate national team as defined under FIFA eligibility rules; some limited exceptions apply. Players may hold more than one non-FIFA nationality.

No.	Pos.	Nation	Player
1	GK	CRO	Tristan Vidackovic
4	DF	POR	Rodrigo Rodeia
5	MF	POR	Francisco Ganço
6	MF	POR	Marco Castelhano
7	MF	POR	João Pázinho
8	FW	POR	Rafael Estevens
10	MF	POR	António Baixinho
12	MF	POR	Carlos Rato
13	DF	NGA	Hamza Najeeb
14	FW	BRA	Lucas Macedo
16	DF	POR	Afonso Mira
17	DF	POR	Daniel Lança

No.	Pos.	Nation	Player
20	DF	POR	Daniel Andrade
21	DF	UKR	Vitalii Kurylchyk
22	DF	BRA	Caio Zuka
25	DF	POR	Bernardo Godinho
26	MF	POR	André Castelhano
30	DF	POR	Chico Mendes
32	FW	BRA	Isaías Cruz
37	GK	POR	José Borracha
44	DF	BRA	Matheus Xavier
96	FW	ANG	Alberto Lubambi
99	GK	POR	Dinis Duarte

== Honours ==
- AF Beja First Division

- 2017-18, 2021-22, 2024-25.

- AF Beja Cup

- 2005-06

== Greatest performances ==
- Taça de Portugal: Third Phase(2003–04, 2017–18)
