= L.G.C. Moncarapachense =

Sports club in Portugal

Moncarapachense
- Full name: Lusitano Ginásio Clube Moncarapachense
- Founded: 4 March 1953; 73 years ago
- Ground: Estádio Dr. António João Eusébio
- Chairman: Nemésio Martins
- Manager: Ivo Soares
- League: Campeonato de Portugal
- 2023-24: Liga 3: Relegated
- Website: https://www.moncarapachense.pt/pt/
Home colours	Away colours

Lusitano Ginásio Clube Moncarapachense, also commonly known as Moncarapachense, is a Portuguese sports club based in Moncarapacho, Olhão competing in the Campeonato de Portugal following relegation from Liga 3. The club was founded 4 March 1953, influenced by Lusitano Ginásio Clube, from Évora. The club's home ground is the Estádio Dr. António João Eusébio.
