= 2022–23 FC Porto season =

FC Porto
2022–23 season
- President: Jorge Nuno Pinto da Costa
- Head coach: Sérgio Conceição
- Stadium: Estádio do Dragão
- Primeira Liga: 2nd
- Taça de Portugal: Winners
- Taça da Liga: Winners
- Supertaça Cândido de Oliveira: Winners
- UEFA Champions League: Round of 16
- Top goalscorer: League: Mehdi Taremi (22); All: Mehdi Taremi (31)
Home colours	Away colours	Third colours

The 2022–23 season was the 129th season in the existence of FC Porto and the club's 89th consecutive season in the top flight of Portuguese football. In addition to the domestic league, they participated in this season's editions of the Taça de Portugal, Taça da Liga, Supertaça Cândido de Oliveira and UEFA Champions League.

== Players ==
=== Current squad ===
As of 6 July 2022

Note: Flags indicate national team as defined under FIFA eligibility rules; some limited exceptions apply. Players may hold more than one non-FIFA nationality.

No.	Pos.	Nation	Player
1	GK	ARG	Agustín Marchesín
2	DF	POR	Fábio Cardoso
3	DF	POR	Pepe (captain)
5	DF	ESP	Iván Marcano
8	MF	COL	Mateus Uribe
9	FW	IRI	Mehdi Taremi
10	FW	POR	Francisco Conceição
11	FW	BRA	Pepê
12	DF	NGR	Zaidu Sanusi
13	FW	BRA	Galeno
14	GK	POR	Cláudio Ramos
16	MF	SRB	Marko Grujić
18	DF	POR	Wilson Manafá
—	DF	POR	Diogo Leite
—	MF	POR	Carraça

No.	Pos.	Nation	Player
22	DF	BRA	Wendell
23	MF	POR	João Mário
25	MF	POR	Otávio (vice-captain)
28	MF	POR	Bruno Costa
29	FW	ESP	Toni Martínez
30	FW	BRA	Evanilson
38	FW	BRA	Fernando Andrade
46	MF	CAN	Stephen Eustáquio
71	GK	POR	Francisco Meixedo
99	GK	POR	Diogo Costa
—	MF	POR	Romário Baró
—	MF	JPN	Shoya Nakajima
—	MF	POR	Sérgio Oliveira
—	MF	SEN	Mamadou Loum
—	FW	POR	Rodrigo Conceição

=== Transfers ===
==== In ====
Date	Pos.	Name	Nationality	Age	Transferred from	Window	Until	Fee	Ref.
1 July 2022	MF	Stephen Eustáquio	Canada	25	Paços de Ferreira (Portugal)	Summer	2027	€3.5M	
5 July 2022	DF	David Carmo	Portugal	22	Braga (Portugal)	Summer	2027	€20M	
5 July 2022	FW	Gabriel Veron	Brazil	19	Palmeiras (Brazil)	Summer	2027	€10.5M	

==== Out ====
Date	Pos.	Name	Nationality	Age	Transferred to	Window	Fee	Ref.
1 July 2022	MF	Fábio Vieira	Portugal	22	Arsenal (England)	Summer	€35M	
1 July 2022	MF	Vitinha	Portugal	22	Paris Saint-Germain (France)	Summer	€41.5M	
1 July 2022	DF	Chancel Mbemba	Democratic Republic of the Congo	27	Marseille (France)	Summer	Free	

==== Loan return ====
Date	Pos.	Name	Nationality	Age	Returned from	Window
30 June 2022	MF	Mamadou Loum	Senegal	25	Alavés (Spain)	Summer
30 June 2022	MF	Carraça	Portugal	29	Belenenses SAD (Portugal)	Summer
30 June 2022	FW	Shoya Nakajima	Japan	27	Portimonense (Portugal)	Summer
30 June 2022	MF	Romário Baró	Portugal	22	Estoril (Portugal)	Summer
30 June 2022	DF	Diogo Leite	Portugal	23	Braga (Portugal)	Summer
30 June 2022	MF	Sérgio Oliveira	Portugal	30	Roma (Italy)	Summer

== Technical staff ==
Position	Staff
Head coach	(Portugal) Sérgio Conceição
Assistant coaches	(Portugal) Vítor Bruno
Assistant coaches	(France) Siramana Dembélé
Goalkeeper coaches	(Portugal) Diamantino Figueiredo (Croatia) Vedran Runje
Exercise Physiologist	(Portugal) Eduardo Oliveira
Fitness coach	(Portugal) Telmo Sousa

Source: FC Porto

== Competitions ==
=== Overall record ===
Competition	First match	Last match	Starting round	Final position	Record							
Competition	First match	Last match	Starting round	Final position	Pld	W	D	L	GF	GA	GD	Win %
Primeira Liga	6 August 2022	27 May 2023	Matchday 1	2nd	34	27	4	3	73	22	+51	79.41
Taça de Portugal	16 October 2022	4 June 2023	Third round	Winners	7	7	0	0	21	3	+18	100.00
Taça da Liga	25 November 2022	28 January 2023	Group stage	Winners	6	5	1	0	15	2	+13	83.33
Supertaça Cândido de Oliveira	30 July 2022		Final	Winners	1	1	0	0	3	0	+3	100.00
UEFA Champions League	7 September 2022	14 March 2023	Group stage	Round of 16	8	4	1	3	12	8	+4	50.00
Total					56	44	6	6	124	35	+89	78.57

Source: Soccerway

=== Primeira Liga ===
==== League table ====
Pos	Team	Pld	W	D	L	GF	GA	GD	Pts	Qualification or relegation
1	Benfica (C)	34	28	3	3	82	20	+62	87	Qualification for the Champions League group stage
2	Porto	34	27	4	3	73	22	+51	85	Qualification for the Champions League group stage
3	Braga	34	25	3	6	75	30	+45	78	Qualification for the Champions League third qualifying round
4	Sporting CP	34	23	5	6	71	32	+39	74	Qualification for the Europa League group stage
5	Arouca	34	15	9	10	36	37	−1	54	Qualification for the Europa Conference League third qualifying round

Source: Liga Portugal
Rules for classification: 1) Points; 2) Head-to-head points; 3) Head-to-head goal difference; 4) Goal difference; 5) Matches won; 6) Goals scored; 7) Play-off.
(C) Champions

==== Results summary ====
Overall								Home						Away					
Pld	W	D	L	GF	GA	GD	Pts	W	D	L	GF	GA	GD	W	D	L	GF	GA	GD
34	27	4	3	73	22	+51	85	15	0	2	46	11	+35	12	4	1	27	11	+16

Source: Liga Portugal

==== Results by round ====
Round	1	2	3	4	5	6	7	8	9	10	11	12	13	14	15	16	17	18	19	20	21	22	23	24	25	26	27	28	29	30	31	32	33	34
Ground	H	A	H	A	A	H	A	H	A	H	A	H	A	H	A	H	A	A	H	A	H	H	A	H	A	H	A	H	A	H	A	H	A	H
Result	W	W	W	L	W	W	D	W	W	L	D	W	W	W	D	W	W	W	W	W	W	L	W	W	D	W	W	W	W	W	W	W	W	W
Position	1	1	1	3	3	3	3	2	2	2	3	2	2	2	3	3	3	2	2	2	2	2	2	2	2	2	2	2	2	2	2	2	2	2

Source: Liga Portugal
A = Away; H = Home; W = Win; D = Draw; L = Loss

==== Matches ====
6 August 2022 1	Porto	5–1	Marítimo	Porto
20:30 WEST (UTC+01:00)	Taremi 12', 42'; Uribe (yellow card) 28'; Evanilson 40'; Marcano (yellow card) 35', (goal) 68'; Martínez 76'; Galeno (yellow card) 87'	Report	Tagueu (yellow card) 28'; Teles (yellow card) 78'; Winck 88'	Stadium: Estádio do Dragão; Attendance: 46,309; Referee: Hélder Malheiro

14 August 2022 2	Vizela	0–1	Porto	Vizela
18:00 WEST (UTC+01:00)	Rosa (yellow card) 31'; Moreira (yellow card) 48'; Samu (yellow card) 56'; Buntić (yellow card) 68'; Kiki (yellow card) 72'; Rashid (yellow card) 89'	Report	João Mário (yellow card) 44'; Pepe (yellow card) 62'; Marcano 89'	Stadium: Estádio do FC Vizela; Attendance: 4,679; Referee: Fábio Veríssimo

20 August 2022 3	Porto	3–0	Sporting CP	Porto
20:30 WEST (UTC+01:00)	Sanusi (yellow card) 41'; Evanilson 42'; Uribe 77' (pen.); Galeno 86' (pen.)	Report	Ugarte (yellow card) 16'; Neto (yellow card) 40'; Morita (yellow card) 42'; Porro (red card) 75'; Reis (yellow card) 76'	Stadium: Estádio do Dragão; Attendance: 49,430; Referee: Nuno Almeida

28 August 2022 4	Rio Ave	3–1	Porto	Vila do Conde
20:30 WEST (UTC+01:00)	Yakubu 22', 43'; Amaral 33'; Gomes (yellow card) 76'	Report	Taremi (yellow card) 49', (penalty missed) 62'; Veron (yellow card) 85'; Martínez 90+3'	Stadium: Estádio dos Arcos; Attendance: 3,980; Referee: Tiago Martins

3 September 2022 5	Gil Vicente	0–2	Porto	Barcelos
20:30 WEST (UTC+01:00)	Carvalho (yellow card) 71'	Report	Taremi 41'; Galeno 44'	Stadium: Estádio Cidade de Barcelos; Attendance: 8,458; Referee: João Pinheiro

10 September 2022 6	Porto	3–0	Chaves	Porto
20:30 WEST (UTC+01:00)	Taremi 3'; Uribe (yellow card) 29'; Evanilson 70'; Franco 82'	Report	Guimarães (yellow card) 28'; Morim (yellow card) 67'; Monte (yellow card) 81'	Stadium: Estádio do Dragão; Attendance: 44,109; Referee: António Nobre

17 September 2022 7	Estoril	1–1	Porto	Estoril
18:00 WEST (UTC+01:00)	Carvalho (yellow card) 23'; Gouveia 41'; Ndiaye (yellow card) 45+2' (yellow-red card) 77'; Martins (yellow card) 56'; Geraldes (yellow card) 57'; Álvaro (yellow card) 90+11'; Figueira (yellow card) 90+11'; Vital (yellow card) 90+13'	Report	Franco (yellow card) 5'; Cardoso (yellow card) 59'; Grujić (yellow card) 86'; Taremi 90+9' (pen.)	Stadium: Estádio António Coimbra da Mota; Attendance: 4,438; Referee: Luís Godinho

30 September 2022 8	Porto	4–1	Braga	Porto
21:15 WEST (UTC+01:00)	Carmo (yellow card) 29'; Evanilson 32'; Eustáquio 34'; Pepê 63'; D. Costa (yellow card) 74'; Galeno 90+6'	Report	Medeiros (yellow card) 23'; Fabiano (yellow card) 38'; Sequeira (yellow card) 40'; Pepe 55' (o.g.); Magalhães (red card) 84'; Horta (yellow card) 84'	Stadium: Estádio do Dragão; Attendance: 44,830; Referee: Artur Soares Dias

8 October 2022 9	Portimonense	0–2	Porto	Portimão
18:00 WEST (UTC+01:00)	Gomes (yellow card) 4'; Pedrão (yellow card) 73'; Cariello (yellow card) 74'; Costa (yellow card) 90+3'	Report	Taremi (yellow card) 14'; Otávio 22'; Pepê 52'; Cardoso (yellow card) 90+4'	Stadium: Estádio Municipal de Portimão; Attendance: 3,969; Referee: Manuel Mota

21 October 2022 10	Porto	0–1	Benfica	Porto
20:15 WEST (UTC+01:00)	Eustáquio (yellow card) 24' (yellow-red card) 27'; Ramos (yellow card) 43'; Cardoso (yellow card) 64'; Taremi (yellow card) 74'	Report	J. Mário (yellow card) 6'; Bah (yellow card) 11'; Fernández (yellow card) 37'; Aursnes (yellow card) 45'; Neres (yellow card) 61'; R. Silva 72'; Grimaldo (yellow card) 80'; Gilberto (yellow card) 90+5'	Stadium: Estádio do Dragão; Attendance: 49,499; Referee: João Pinheiro

29 October 2022 11	Santa Clara	1–1	Porto	Ponta Delgada
14:30 AZOST (UTC±00:00)	Boateng (yellow card) 13', (goal) 83'; González (yellow card) 17'; Babi (yellow card) 61'; Bobsin (yellow card) 90+3'	Report	Cardoso 3'; Evanilson (yellow card) 65'	Stadium: Estádio de São Miguel; Attendance: 5,692; Referee: Artur Soares Dias

5 November 2022 12	Porto	4–0	Paços de Ferreira	Porto
18:00 WET (UTC±00:00)	Evanilson 4', 39'; Taremi 31'; Delgado 55' (o.g.); Grujić (yellow card) 68'; João Mário (yellow card) 82'	Report	Pires (yellow card) 44'; Delgado (yellow card) 69'; Djaló (yellow card) 88'	Stadium: Estádio do Dragão; Attendance: 41,730; Referee: Manuel Oliveira

12 November 2022 13	Boavista	1–4	Porto	Porto
20:30 WET (UTC±00:00)	Cannon (yellow card) 24' (yellow-red card) 58'; Camará (yellow card) 53'; Lourenço (yellow card) 59'; Costa 90+1' (o.g.); Makouta (yellow card) 90+4'	Report	Marcano 41'; Eustáquio 64'; Galeno 83', 90+2'; Uribe (yellow card) 90'	Stadium: Estádio do Bessa; Attendance: 11,335; Referee: Luís Godinho

28 December 2022 14	Porto	5–1	Arouca	Porto
21:15 WET (UTC±00:00)	Otávio 1'; Taremi 18', 34', 50'; Marcano (yellow card) 59'; Opoku 70' (o.g.)	Report	Ruiz (yellow card) 36'; Sylla (yellow card) 48'; Marques 75'; Basso (yellow card) 85'	Stadium: Estádio do Dragão; Attendance: 45,725; Referee: Tiago Martins

7 January 2023 15	Casa Pia	0–0	Porto	Lisbon
20:30 WET (UTC±00:00)	Soares (yellow card) 33' (yellow-red card) 45+1'; Batista (yellow card) 74'	Report		Stadium: Estádio Pina Manique; Attendance: 8,107; Referee: Nuno Almeida

15 January 2023 16	Porto	4–1	Famalicão	Porto
20:30 WET (UTC±00:00)	Galeno 10', 21', (yellow card) 36'; Otávio 42'; Wendell (yellow card) 44'; Taremi 48'; Marcano (yellow card) 55'	Report	Fonte 52'; Júnior (yellow card) 57'	Stadium: Estádio do Dragão; Attendance: 33,313; Referee: Gustavo Correia

21 January 2023 17	Vitória de Guimarães	0–1	Porto	Guimarães
20:30 WET (UTC±00:00)	Janvier (yellow card) 17'; Silva (yellow card) 57'; da Luz (yellow card) 71'; Safira (yellow card) 87'; Amaro (yellow card) 90'; Nogueira (yellow card) 90+2'	Report	Otávio (yellow card) 35'; Pepe (yellow card) 41'; João Mário 45+2'; Wendell (yellow card) 47'; Marcano (yellow card) 81'	Stadium: Estádio D. Afonso Henriques; Attendance: 19,653; Referee: Luís Godinho

1 February 2023 18	Marítimo	0–2	Porto	Funchal
19:00 WET (UTC±00:00)	Val (yellow card) 6'; Moreno (yellow card) 13' (yellow-red card) 42'; Pereira (yellow card) 36'; Nito (yellow card) 64'; Costa (yellow card) 66'	Report	Folha (yellow card) 7' (yellow-red card) 38'; Wendell 50'; Galeno 55'; Sanusi (yellow card) 85'	Stadium: Estádio do Marítimo; Attendance: 9,624; Referee: Fábio Veríssimo

5 February 2023 19	Porto	2–0	Vizela	Porto
18:00 WET (UTC±00:00)	Wendell (yellow card) 9'; Taremi (yellow card) 12', (goal) 86'; Pepê 41'	Report	Bondoso (yellow card) 26'; Osmajić (yellow card) 79'	Stadium: Estádio do Dragão; Attendance: 41,211; Referee: Claúdio Pereira

12 February 2023 20	Sporting CP	1–2	Porto	Lisbon
18:00 WET (UTC±00:00)	Reis (yellow card) 42'; Ugarte (yellow card) 68'; Edwards (yellow card) 77'; Adán (yellow card) 90+6'; Chermiti 90+7'	Report	Galeno (yellow card) 44'; Uribe 60'; Pepê 90+4'	Stadium: Estádio José Alvalade; Attendance: 39,528; Referee: Artur Soares Dias

18 February 2023 21	Porto	1–0	Rio Ave	Porto
20:30 WET (UTC±00:00)	Martínez 44'; João Mário (yellow card) 65'; Pepê (yellow card) 90+1'	Report	Ronaldo (yellow card) 32'; Pantalon (yellow card) 44'; APereira (yellow card) 67'	Stadium: Estádio do Dragão; Attendance: 40,629; Referee: Vítor Ferreira

26 February 2023 22	Porto	1–2	Gil Vicente	Porto
20:30 WET (UTC±00:00)	Taremi 4'; João Mário (red card) 35'; Uribe (yellow card) 43' (yellow-red card) 52'; Otávio (yellow card) 63'; Eustáquio (yellow card) 76'; Pepe (yellow card) 78'	Report	Fujimoto (yellow card) 22'; Navarro 26', (yellow card) 76'; Costa 45+2'; Zé Carlos (yellow card) 64'; Andrew (yellow card) 83'; Aouacheria (yellow card) 86'	Stadium: Estádio do Dragão; Attendance: 35,509; Referee: Rui Costa

4 March 2023 23	Chaves	1–3	Porto	Chaves
20:30 WET (UTC±00:00)	João Pedro (yellow card) 28'; Vitória 53' (pen.); Langa (yellow card) 54'; Jô (yellow card) 57' (yellow-red card) 73'; Ponck (yellow card) 83'; João Mendes (yellow card) 85' (yellow-red card) 87'; Guima (yellow card) 90+4'; Singh (yellow card) 90+8'	Report	Eustáquio (yellow card) 8'; Loader 15', (yellow card) 48'; Marcano (yellow card) 27'; Otávio 43'; Grujić (yellow card) 84'; Sanusi (yellow card) 90+5'; Martínez 90+6'	Stadium: Estádio Municipal de Chaves; Attendance: 5,568; Referee: Manuel Oliveira

10 March 2023 24	Porto	3–2	Estoril	Porto
20:15 WET (UTC±00:00)	Grujić (yellow card) 4', (goal) 9'; Franco 31'; Pepe (yellow card) 67'; Taremi 73' (pen.); Galeno (yellow card) 90+4'	Report	Geraldes (yellow card) 15' (yellow-red card) 90+6', (goal) 67' (pen.); Cassiano (yellow card) 20'; Gouveia 27'; Santos (yellow card) 53'; Gamboa (yellow card) 90+2'	Stadium: Estádio do Dragão; Attendance: 29,116; Referee: Gustavo Correia

19 March 2023 25	Braga	0–0	Porto	Braga
18:00 WET (UTC±00:00)	Niakaté (yellow card) 81'; Djaló (yellow card) 88'; Gómez (yellow card) 90+3'	Report	Otávio (yellow card) 86'	Stadium: Estádio Municipal de Braga; Attendance: 22,256; Referee: João Pinheiro

2 April 2023 26	Porto	1–0	Portimonense	Porto
20:30 WEST (UTC+01:00)	Cardoso 30', (yellow card) 34'; Marcano (yellow card) 50'	Report	Nonoca (yellow card) 52' (yellow-red card) 71'; Róchez (yellow card) 56'	Stadium: Estádio do Dragão; Attendance: 35,802; Referee: Miguel Nogueira

7 April 2023 27	Benfica	1–2	Porto	Lisbon
18:00 WEST (UTC+01:00)	Costa 10' (o.g.); Florentino (yellow card) 14'; Gilberto (yellow card) 49'; A. Silva (yellow card) 83'	Report	Uribe (yellow card) 22' (goal) 45'; Otávio (yellow card) 45+5'; Grujić (yellow card) 49'; Manafá (yellow card) 52'; Taremi 54' (yellow card) 87'	Stadium: Estádio da Luz; Attendance: 62,028; Referee: Artur Soares Dias

15 April 2023 28	Porto	2–1	Santa Clara	Porto
20:30 WEST (UTC+01:00)	Uribe 34'; Marcano (yellow card) 51'; Loader 80'; Franco (yellow card) 89'	Report	Costinha (yellow card) 17'; Jordão (yellow card) 20'; Nogueira (yellow card) 32'; Allano (yellow card) 33'; Sagna (yellow card) 41'; Tagawa 90+2'	Stadium: Estádio do Dragão; Attendance: 40,708; Referee: Claúdio Pereira

22 April 2023 29	Paços de Ferreira	0–2	Porto	Paços de Ferreira
20:30 WEST (UTC+01:00)	Lima (yellow card) 38'; Pires (yellow card) 40'; Holsgrove (yellow card) 45+2' (yellow-red card) 45+3'; Delgado (yellow card) 45+5'	Report	Taremi 66' (pen.); Marcano (yellow card) 68'; Martínez 83'	Stadium: Estádio da Mata Real; Attendance: 7,852; Referee: Fábio Veríssimo

30 April 2023 30	Porto	1–0	Boavista	Porto
18:00 WEST (UTC+01:00)	Taremi (yellow card) 42', (goal) 59' (pen.); Marcano (red card) 66'; Uribe (yellow card) 84'	Report	Agra (yellow card) 20'; Makouta (yellow card) 25'; Njie (yellow card) 43'; Gorré (yellow card) 90+4'; Pérez (yellow card) 90+5'	Stadium: Estádio do Dragão; Attendance: 47,925; Referee: Rui Costa

8 May 2023 31	Arouca	0–1	Porto	Arouca
21:15 WEST (UTC+01:00)	Sylla (yellow card) 85'	Report	Otávio (yellow card) 31'; Marcano (yellow card) 33', (goal) 44'	Stadium: Estádio Municipal de Arouca; Attendance: 4,092; Referee: João Pinheiro

14 May 2023 32	Porto	2–1	Casa Pia	Porto
20:30 WEST (UTC+01:00)	Taremi 56'; Loader 90+3', (yellow card) 90+9'	Report	Evanilson 45+5'; Zolotić (yellow card) 49'; Cardoso (yellow card) 74'; Taira (yellow card) 90+7'	Stadium: Estádio do Dragão; Attendance: 35,203; Referee: Manuel Oliveira

20 May 2023 33	Famalicão	2–4	Porto	Vila Nova de Famalicão
20:30 WEST (UTC+01:00)	Júnior (yellow card) 6'; Rodrigues (yellow card) 26'; Jaime 33'; Colombatto 44' (pen.), (yellow card) 45+1'; Youssouf (yellow card) 66'; Otávio (yellow card) 73'	Report	Taremi 7' (pen.), 10', 67' (pen.), 75' (pen.), (yellow card) 18'; Pepê (yellow card) 42'; Otávio (yellow card) 57'	Stadium: Estádio Municipal 22 de Junho; Attendance: 4,992; Referee: Fábio Veríssimo

27 May 2023 34	Porto	3–0	Vitória de Guimarães	Porto
18:00 WEST (UTC+01:00)	Taremi 8'; Otávio 32', (yellow card) 72'; Evanilson 39'; Uribe (yellow card) 87'	Report	Händel (red card) 2'; D. Silva (yellow card) 40'; Freitas (yellow card) 44'; Tounkara (yellow card) 62'; T. Silva (yellow card) 72'; Sá (yellow card) 72'; Índio (yellow card) 89'	Stadium: Estádio do Dragão; Attendance: 42,417; Referee: Artur Soares Dias

=== Taça de Portugal ===
16 October 2022 Third round	Anadia	0–6	Porto	Anadia
20:45 WEST (UTC+01:00)	Santos (yellow card) 35'	Report	Conceição (yellow card) 12'; Loader 6', (yellow card) 26'; Veron 11'; Martínez 31', 86'; Cardoso 50'; Wendell (yellow card) 63'; B. Costa 90'	Stadium: Municipal Engº Sílvio Henriques Cerveira; Referee: Miguel Nogueira

8 November 2022 Fourth round	Mafra	0–3	Porto	Mafra
20:45 WET (UTC±00:00)	Cordeiro (yellow card) 47'; Ferreira (yellow card) 83'	Report	Marcano 7'; Eustáquio (yellow card) 24', (goal) 38'; Galeno 73'; Cardoso (yellow card) 83'	Stadium: Estádio Municipal de Mafra; Referee: Hélder Malheiro

11 January 2023 Fifth round	Porto	4–0	Arouca	Porto
20:45 WET (UTC±00:00)	Galeno 31'; Martinez 54', 57', 90+3'	Report		Stadium: Estádio do Dragão; Referee: João Gonçalves

8 February 2023 Quarter-finals	Académico de Viseu	0–1	Porto	Viseu
20:45 WET (UTC±0)	Milioransa (yellow card) 45'; Silva (yellow card) 75'; Almeida (yellow card) 89'; Toro (yellow card) 90+5'	Report	Martínez (yellow card) 45+4'; Uribe (yellow card) 47'; Franco 50'; Mário (yellow card) 53'; Marcelo (yellow card) 90+2'	Stadium: Estádio do Fontelo; Referee: Gustavo Correia

26 April 2023 Semi-finals; First leg	Famalicão	1–2	Porto	Vila Nova de Famalicão
20:30 WEST (UTC+1)	Penetra 36'; Moura (yellow card) 45+1'; Pablo (yellow card) 80'; Otávio (yellow card) 90+1'	Report	Marcano 16'; Grujić (yellow card) 31'; Otávio (yellow card) 44'; Martínez 63'	Stadium: Estádio Municipal 22 de Junho; Referee: Gustavo Correia

4 May 2023 Semi-finals; Second leg	Porto	3–2 (a.e.t.) (5–3 agg.)	Famalicão	Porto
20:30 WEST (UTC+1)	Galeno 28' (pen.); Pepe (yellow card) 30'; Otávio 120+1', (yellow card) 120+3'; Evanilson 120+5'	Report	Cádiz 21'; Dobre (yellow card) 26'; Colombatto (yellow card) 39'; Jaime 75'; Rodrigues (yellow card) 83'; Mihaj (yellow card) 100'; Penetra (yellow card) 108'; Moura (yellow card) 110'; Denílson (yellow card) 112'	Stadium: Estádio do Dragão; Referee: Manuel Mota

4 June 2023 Final	Braga	0–2	Porto	Oeiras
17:15 WEST (UTC+1)	Horta (yellow card) 29'; Borja (yellow card) 35'; Gómez (yellow card) 66'; Niakaté (red card) 79'; Bruma (yellow card) 85'	Report	Otávio (yellow card) 25', (goal) 81'; A. Horta 53' (o.g.); Galeno (yellow card) 60'; Wendell (red card) 62'; Conceição (yellow card) 66'; Uribe (yellow card) 72'; Taremi (yellow card) 76'; Pepê (yellow card) 85'	Stadium: Estádio Nacional; Referee: João Pinheiro

=== Taça da Liga ===
==== Group stage ====
Pos	Team	Pld	W	D	L	GF	GA	GD	Pts	Qualification	POR	MAF	VIZ	CHA
1	Porto	3	2	1	0	8	2	+6	7	Advance to knockout phase	—	2–2	4–0	—
2	Mafra	3	1	2	0	5	4	+1	5		—	—	1–1	—
3	Vizela	3	0	2	1	3	7	−4	2		—	—	—	2–2
4	Chaves	3	0	1	2	3	6	−3	1		0–2	1–2	—	—

Source: Liga Portugal
Rules for classification: Tiebreakers

25 November 2022 1	Porto	2–2	Mafra	Porto
20:45 WET (UTC±00:00)	Uribe (yellow card) 26'; Pepê 48', (yellow card) 78'; Martínez 48'	Report	Fati 16'; Almeida (yellow card) 29'; Ferreira 42', (yellow card) 44'; Pacheco (yellow card) 72'; Samu (yellow card) 80'; Oliveira (yellow card) 84' (yellow-red card) 89'; Barcelos (yellow card) 84'; Banguera (yellow card) 90+2'	Stadium: Estádio do Dragão; Attendance: 22,217; Referee: Miguel Nogueira

8 December 2022 2	Chaves	0–2	Porto	Chaves
19:00 WET (UTC±00:00)	Euller (yellow card) 51'; Singh (yellow card) 54'; Vitória (yellow card) 70'; Guima (yellow card) 82'; Hernández (yellow card) 90+3'	Report	Loader 55', 59'	Stadium: Estádio Municipal de Chaves; Attendance: 5,360; Referee: Claúdio Pereira

16 December 2022 3	Porto	4–0	Vizela	Porto
20:30 WET (UTC±00:00)	Martínez 1'; Galeno (yellow card) 33', (goal) 48'; Wendell (yellow card) 43', (goal) 58'; Taremi 67' (pem.); Evanilson (yellow card) 73'; Grujić (yellow card) 75'; Uribe (yellow card) 90+2'	Report	Claudemir (yellow card) 31'; Guzzo (yellow card) 51'; Julião (yellow card) 52'; Afonso (yellow card) 65'	Stadium: Estádio do Dragão; Attendance: 21,929; Referee: Vítor Ferreira

==== Quarter-finals ====
21 December 2022	Porto	2–0	Gil Vicente	Porto
20:15 WET (UTC±0)	Galeno 4'; Grujić (yellow card) 41'; Martínez (yellow card) 45'; Evanilson (yellow card) 46'; Taremi 67'	Report	Veiga (yellow card) 21' (yellow-red card) 63'; Cunha (yellow card) 26'; Aburjania (yellow card) 45+6'; Boselli (yellow card) 47'	Stadium: Estádio do Dragão; Attendance: 21,813; Referee: Manuel Mota

==== Semi-finals ====
25 January 2023	Porto	3–0	Académico de Viseu	Leiria
19:45 WET (UTC±0)	Eustáquio 7', (yellow card) 50'; Namaso 66'; Folha 79'	Report	Toro (yellow card) 34'; Messeguem (yellow card) 59'; Fonseca (yellow card) 72'; Clóvis (yellow card) 74'; Milioransa (yellow card) 89'	Stadium: Estádio Dr. Magalhães Pessoa; Attendance: 9,576; Referee: Rui Costa

==== Final ====
28 January 2023	Sporting CP	0–2	Porto	Leiria
19:45 WET (UTC±0)	Ugarte (yellow card) 32'; Paulinho (yellow card) 63' (yellow-red card) 72'; Gonçalves (yellow card) 67'; Reis (yellow card) 90+6'	Report	Eustáquio 10'; Pepe (yellow card) 63'; Wendell (yellow card) 67'; Marcano 86'; Borges (yellow card) 90+6'	Stadium: Estádio Dr. Magalhães Pessoa; Attendance: 19,263; Referee: João Pinheiro

=== Supertaça Cândido de Oliveira ===
30 July 2022 Final	Porto	3–0	Tondela	Aveiro
20:45 WEST (UTC+01:00)	Taremi 30', 82', (yellow card) 87'; Evanilson 33'; Uribe (yellow card) 60'; Grujić (yellow card) 64'	Report	Khacef (yellow card) 37'; Rafael Barbosa (yellow card) 63'	Stadium: Estádio Municipal de Aveiro; Attendance: 28,205; Referee: Manuel Mota

=== UEFA Champions League ===
==== Group stage ====
Pos	Team	Pld	W	D	L	GF	GA	GD	Pts	Qualification	POR	BRU	LEV	ATM
1	(Portugal) Porto	6	4	0	2	12	7	+5	12	Advance to knockout phase	—	0–4	2–0	2–1
2	(Belgium) Club Brugge	6	3	2	1	7	4	+3	11	Advance to knockout phase	0–4	—	1–0	2–0
3	(Germany) Bayer Leverkusen	6	1	2	3	4	8	−4	5 (Note: Head-to-head points: Bayer Leverkusen 4, Atlético Madrid 1.)	Transfer to Europa League	0–3	0–0	—	2–0
4	(Spain) Atlético Madrid	6	1	2	3	5	9	−4	5		2–1	0–0	2–2	—

Source: UEFA
Rules for classification: Group stage tiebreakers
Notes:

7 September 2022 1	Atlético Madrid (Spain)	2–1	(Portugal) Porto	Madrid, Spain
21:00 CEST (UTC+2)	Koke (yellow card) 56'; Hermoso 90+1', (yellow card) 90+5'; Griezmann 90+11'	Report	Pepê (yellow card) 54'; Uribe (yellow card) 68', (goal) 90+6' (pen.); Taremi (yellow card) 71' (yellow-red card) 81'	Stadium: Wanda Metropolitano; Attendance: 51,777; Referee: Szymon Marciniak (Poland)

13 September 2022 2	Porto (Portugal)	0–4	(Belgium) Club Brugge	Porto, Portugal
20:00 WEST (UTC+1)	João Mário (yellow card) 14'; Carmo (yellow card) 77'	Report	Jutglà 15' (pen.); Onyedika (yellow card) 19'; Odoi (yellow card) 27'; Nielsen (yellow card) 45+1'; Sowah 47'; Skov Olsen 52'; Sylla (yellow card) 54'; Nusa 89'	Stadium: Estádio do Dragão; Attendance: 39,225; Referee: Anastasios Sidiropoulos (Greece)

4 October 2022 3	Porto (Portugal)	2–0	(Germany) Bayer Leverkusen	Porto, Portugal
20:00 WEST (UTC+1)	João Mário (yellow card) 50'; Uribe (yellow card) 61'; Sanusi 69'; Galeno 87'; Carmo (yellow card) 90+1'	Report	Hincapié (yellow card) 40'; Schick (penalty missed) 45'; Frimpong (yellow card) 53' (yellow-red card) 88'; Andrich (yellow card) 56'	Stadium: Estádio do Dragão; Attendance: 42,399; Referee: Anthony Taylor (England)

12 October 2022 4	Bayer Leverkusen (Germany)	0–3	(Portugal) Porto	Leverkusen, Germany
21:00 CEST (UTC+2)	Demirbay (penalty missed) 16'; Hincapié (yellow card) 63'; Bakker (yellow card) 65'; Paulinho (yellow card) 84'	Report	Galeno 6'; João Mário (yellow card) 32'; Taremi 53' (pen.), 64' (pen.); Borges (yellow card) 90+3'	Stadium: BayArena; Attendance: 30,210; Referee: István Kovács (Romania)

26 October 2022 5	Club Brugge (Belgium)	0–4	(Portugal) Porto	Bruges, Belgium
18:45 CEST (UTC+2)	Odoi (yellow card) 28'; Sylla (yellow card) 54'; Onyedika (yellow card) 56'	Report	Eustáquio (yellow card) 29', (goal) 60'; Taremi 29', 70'; Otávio (yellow card) 42'; Carmo (yellow card) 49'; Evanilson 57'; Uribe (yellow card) 65'	Stadium: Jan Breydel Stadium; Attendance: 26,144; Referee: Michael Oliver (England)

1 November 2022 6	Porto (Portugal)	2–1	(Spain) Atlético Madrid	Porto, Portugal
17:45 WET (UTC±0)	Taremi 5'; Eustáquio 24'; Grujić (yellow card) 39'; Cardoso (yellow card) 68'	Report	Mandava (yellow card) 42'; Savić (yellow card) 48'; De Paul (yellow card) 69'; Marcano 90+5' (o.g.)	Stadium: Estádio do Dragão; Attendance: 47,546; Referee: Daniele Orsato (Italy)

==== Knockout phase ====
===== Round of 16 =====
22 February 2023 First leg	Inter Milan (Italy)	1–0	(Portugal) Porto	Milan, Italy
21:00 CET (UTC+1)	Dimarco (yellow card) 41'; Lukaku 86'	Report	Otávio (yellow card) 41' (yellow-red card) 78'; Pepê (yellow card) 63'	Stadium: San Siro; Attendance: 75,374; Referee: Srđan Jovanović (Serbia)

14 March 2023 Second leg	Porto (Portugal)	0–0 (0–1 agg.)	(Italy) Inter Milan	Porto, Portugal
20:00 WET (UTC±0)	Pepê (yellow card) 79' (yellow-red card) 90+7'	Report	Darmian (yellow card) 33'; Džeko (yellow card) 69'; Acerbi (yellow card) 90'	Stadium: Estádio do Dragão; Attendance: 48,015; Referee: Szymon Marciniak (Poland)

== Statistics ==
=== Appearances and goals ===
No.	Pos	Nat	Player	Total		Primeira Liga		Taça de Portugal		Taça da Liga		Supertaça Cândido de Oliveira		Champions League	
No.	Pos	Nat	Player	Apps	Goals	Apps	Goals	Apps	Goals	Apps	Goals	Apps	Goals	Apps	Goals
Goalkeepers
14	GK	(Portugal) POR	Cláudio Ramos	13	0	1	0	6	0	6	0	0	0	0	0
71	GK	(Portugal) POR	Francisco Meixedo	0	0	0	0	0	0	0	0	0	0	0	0
94	GK	(Brazil) BRA	Samuel Portugal	0	0	0	0	0	0	0	0	0	0	0	0
99	GK	(Portugal) POR	Diogo Costa	41	0	33	0	0	0	0	0	0	0	8	0
Defenders
2	DF	(Portugal) POR	Fábio Cardoso	31	3	14+3	2	4+1	0	4	1	1	0	4	0
3	DF	(Portugal) POR	Pepe	34	0	22+2	0	2	0	3+1	0	0	0	4	0
4	DF	(Portugal) POR	David Carmo	15	0	7+2	0	0	0	1	0	0	0	5	0
5	DF	(Spain) ESP	Iván Marcano	40	7	25	4	6	1	4+1	2	1	0	3	0
12	DF	(Nigeria) NGR	Zaidu Sanusi	30	1	10+8	0	0+1	0	1+1	0	1	0	7+1	1
17	DF	(Portugal) POR	Rodrigo Conceição	25	0	6+10	0	1+3	0	1+2	0	0	0	0+2	0
18	DF	(Portugal) POR	Wilson Manafá	10	0	5+2	0	0	0	2+1	0	0	0	0	0
22	DF	(Brazil) BRA	Wendell	43	2	24+2	1	6	1	5	0	0	0	1+5	0
23	DF	(Portugal) POR	João Mário	27	1	3+9	1	5+1	0	3	0	1	0	4+1	0
Midfielders
8	MF	(Colombia) COL	Mateus Uribe	50	5	29+2	4	6	0	3+2	0	1	0	7	1
16	MF	(Serbia) SRB	Marko Grujić	36	1	14+10	1	3	0	3+1	0	1	0	3+1	0
25	MF	(Portugal) POR	Otávio	43	6	25+2	5	3+1	0	5	1	0	0	6+1	0
28	MF	(Portugal) POR	Bruno Costa	13	1	4+2	0	1	0	1+1	1	0+1	0	1+2	0
46	DF	(Canada) CAN	Stephen Eustáquio	36	5	19+10	2	2	2	2+2	1	0+1	0	0	0
67	MF	(Portugal) POR	Vasco Sousa	1	0	0+1	0	0	0	0	0	0	0	0	0
87	MF	(Portugal) POR	Bernardo Folha	13	1	1+4	0	4	1	1+1	0	0	0	0+2	0
Forwards
7	FW	(Brazil) BRA	Gabriel Veron	25	1	2+15	0	1+1	0	2	1	1	0	0+3	0
9	FW	(Iran) IRI	Mehdi Taremi	50	31	31+2	22	2+3	2	1+3	0	1	2	7	5
11	FW	(Brazil) BRA	Pepê	54	5	28+6	4	5+1	1	3+2	0	1	0	8	0
13	FW	(Brazil) BRA	Galeno	51	15	20+11	8	5+1	2	3+2	3	0+1	0	7+1	2
19	FW	(Cameroon) CMR	Danny Loader	36	7	5+17	3	3+2	3	4+1	1	1	0	0+3	0
20	FW	(Portugal) POR	André Franco	24	3	6+11	2	1+2	0	1+2	1	0	0	0+1	0
29	FW	(Spain) ESP	Toni Martínez	49	13	10+21	5	4	2	4+2	6	0+1	0	0+7	0
30	FW	(Brazil) BRA	Evanilson	40	10	18+5	7	0+3	0	1+4	1	1	1	6+2	1
50	FW	(Brazil) BRA	Wendel	1	0	0	0	0+1	0	0	0	0	0	0	0
70	FW	(Portugal) POR	Gonçalo Borges	20	0	0+10	0	0+4	0	0+2	0	0	0	0+4	0
98	FW	(Nigeria) NGR	Abraham Marcus	1	0	0+1	0	0	0	0	0	0	0	0	0
Players who made an appearance and/or had a squad number but left the team.
1	GK	(Argentina) ARG	Agustín Marchesín	1	0	0	0	0	0	0	0	1	0	0	0
