= 2022 Supertaça Cândido de Oliveira =

Supertaça Cândido de Oliveira Vodafone
- Event: Supertaça Cândido de Oliveira (Portuguese Super Cup)
Porto	Tondela
3	0
- Date: 30 July 2022
- Venue: Estádio Municipal de Aveiro, Aveiro
- Man of the Match: Mehdi Taremi (Porto)
- Referee: Manuel Mota
- Attendance: 28,205

The 2022 Supertaça Cândido de Oliveira was the 44th edition of the Supertaça Cândido de Oliveira. It was played between the winners of the 2021–22 Primeira Liga and the 2021–22 Taça de Portugal, Porto, and the runners-up of the 2021–22 Taça de Portugal, Tondela, on 30 July 2022. Porto won the match 3–0 to secure their 23rd Supertaça title.

== Venue ==
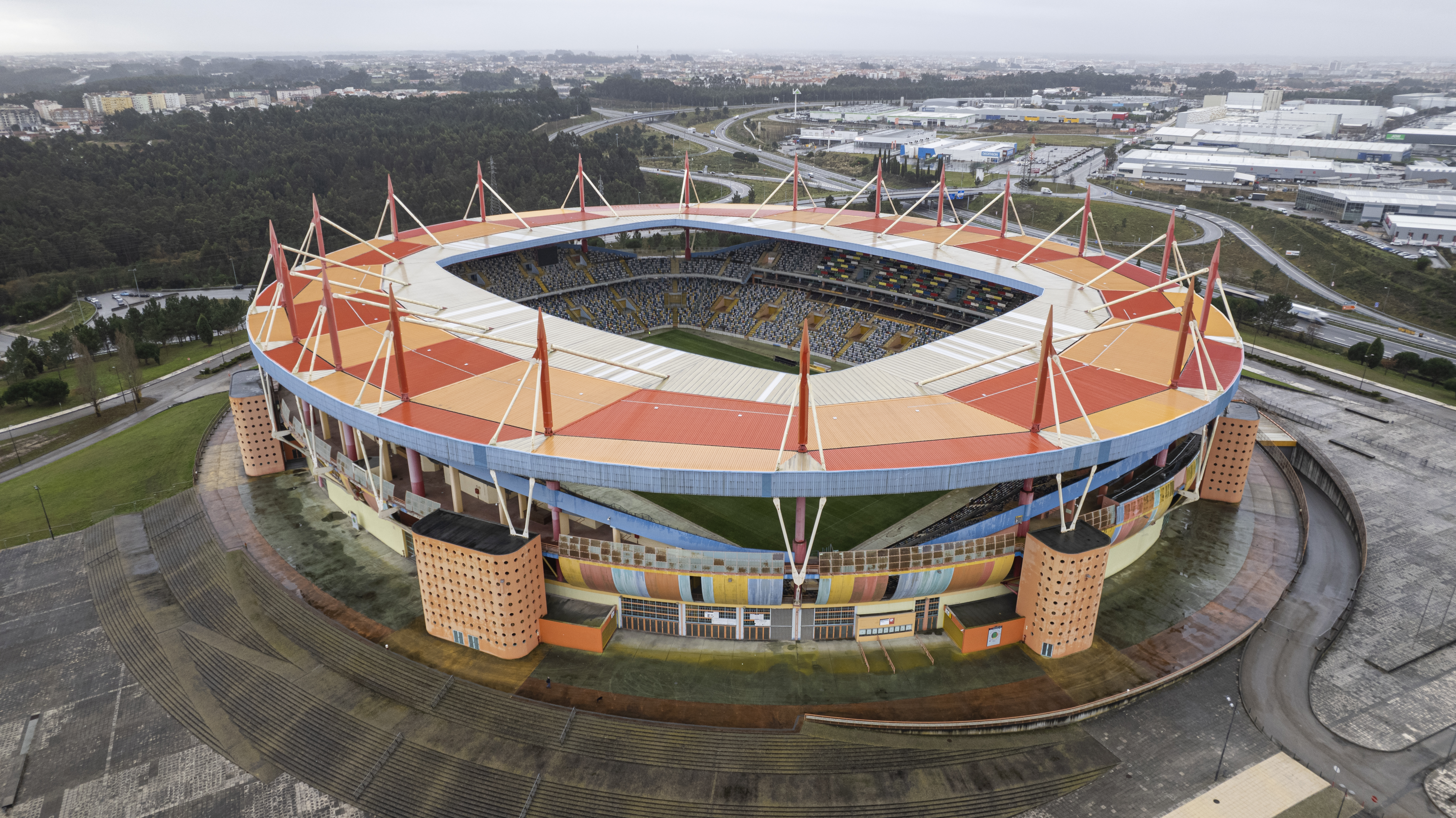
Estádio Municipal de Aveiro

This was the twelfth time the Supertaça was played at the Estádio Municipal de Aveiro, having hosted all Supertaça matches but two since 2009, both of them played at Estádio Algarve, in 2015 and 2019.

== Match ==
=== Details ===
30 July 2022
20:45 WEST (UTC+01:00)

Porto	3–0	Tondela
Taremi 30', 82'; Evanilson 33'	Report

Estádio Municipal de Aveiro, Aveiro
Attendance: 28,205
Referee: Manuel Mota

Porto	Tondela

GK	1	(Argentina) Agustín Marchesín
RB	23	(Portugal) João Mário
CB	5	(Spain) Iván Marcano
CB	3	(Portugal) Pepe (c)
LB	12	(Nigeria) Zaidu Sanusi
RW	8	(Colombia) Mateus Uribe		(yellow card) 60'
CM	16	(Serbia) Marko Grujić	(yellow card) 64'	(substituted off) 70'
LW	19	(England) Danny Loader		(substituted off) 70'
LF	11	(Brazil) Pepê		(substituted off) 87'
CF	30	(Brazil) Evanilson		(substituted off) 46'
RF	9	(Iran) Mehdi Taremi	(yellow card) 87'	(substituted off) 87'
Substitutes:
GK	14	(Portugal) Cláudio Ramos
DF	22	(Brazil) Wendell
DF	43	(Brazil) João Marcelo
MF	28	(Portugal) Bruno Costa		(substituted on) 87'
MF	46	(Canada) Stephen Eustáquio		(substituted on) 70'
FW	7	(Brazil) Gabriel Veron		(substituted on) 87'
FW	13	(Brazil) Galeno		(substituted on) 70'
FW	29	(Spain) Toni Martínez		(substituted on) 46'
FW	70	(Portugal) Gonçalo Borges
Manager:
(Portugal) Sérgio Conceição

GK	16	(Mauritania) Babacar Niasse
RB	19	(Portugal) Tiago Almeida
CB	4	(Portugal) Jota Gonçalves		(substituted off) 80'
CB	33	(Brazil) Marcelo Alves
CB	15	(Spain) Manu Hernando
LB	3	(Algeria) Naoufel Khacef	(yellow card) 37'	(substituted off) 46'
RM	8	(Portugal) Telmo Arcanjo		(substituted off) 90'
CM	6	(Brazil) Pedro Augusto		(c)
CM	21	(Spain) Iker Undabarrena		(substituted off) 86'
LM	2	(Brazil) Bebeto
CF	9	(Brazil) Daniel dos Anjos
Substitutes:
GK	1	(Sweden) Philip Tear
DF	3	(Portugal) Rafael Alcobia
DF	28	(Portugal) Rodrigo Fajardo
MF	18	(Venezuela) Matías Lacava		(substituted on) 80'
MF	23	(Portugal) Cascavel		(substituted on) 90'
MF	45	(Angola) Betel Muhungo
FW	7	(Portugal) Rúben Fonseca		(substituted on) 86'
FW	10	(Portugal) Rafael Barbosa	(substituted on) 46'	(yellow card) 63'
FW	17	(Portugal) Cuba
Manager:
(Portugal) Tozé Marreco

Man of the Match:
(Iran) Mehdi Taremi (Porto)

Assistant referees:
Luciano Maia
Inácio Pereira
Fourth official:
António Nobre
Video assistant referee:
Hugo Miguel
Assistant video assistant referees:
Fábio Veríssimo
Pedro Martins

Match rules

- 90 minutes.
- 30 minutes of extra time if necessary.
- Penalty shoot-out if scores still level.
- Seven named substitutes, of which up to five may be used during regular time. (Note: Each team was given only three opportunities to make substitutions, excluding substitutions made at half-time.)

== See also ==
- 2022–23 Primeira Liga
- 2022–23 Taça de Portugal
- 2022–23 Taça da Liga
- 2022–23 FC Porto season
