= Danny Namaso =

Cameroonian international footballer (born 2000)

Personal information
- Full name: Daniel Namaso Edi-Mesumbe Loader
- Date of birth: 28 August 2000 (age 26)
- Place of birth: Reading, England
- Height: 6 ft 0 in (1.82 m)
- Position: Forward

Team information
- Current team: Auxerre
- Number: 19

Youth career
- Wycombe Wanderers
- 2012–2017: Reading

Senior career*
Years	Team	Apps	(Gls)
2017–2020	Reading	28	(1)
2020–2022	Porto B	63	(22)
2021–2026	Porto	68	(8)
2025–2026	→ Auxerre (loan)	30	(3)
2026–	Auxerre	7	(3)

International career^{‡}
2015–2016	England U16	11	(2)
2016–2017	England U17	14	(6)
2017–2018	England U18	7	(0)
2018–2019	England U19	10	(4)
2019	England U20	9	(1)
2025–	Cameroon	15	(1)
Medal record
Men's football
Representing England
FIFA U17 World Cup
Winner	2017 India
UEFA European U17 Championship
Runner-up	2017 Croatia
- * Club domestic league appearances and goals as of 20 October 2026 ‡ National team caps and goals as of 20 October 2026

Daniel Namaso Edi-Mesumbe Loader (born 28 August 2000) is a professional footballer who plays as a forward for Ligue 1 club Auxerre. Born in England, he plays for the Cameroon national team.

== Club career ==
=== Reading ===
Namaso was born in Reading, Berkshire, and started his career in the youth team of Wycombe Wanderers before joining the under-13 side at his hometown club Reading in 2012. He studied at Leighton Park School and then The Forest School. In 2016 he won the Maurice Edelston Memorial Trophy for the best academy schoolboy at the club. In the summer of 2016 he started a two-year scholarship, but was quickly promoted to the under-23 side after a number of games and went on to represent the side in the EFL Trophy campaign.

He made his professional debut for the first team at the age of sixteen in August 2017, coming on as a substitute for Leandro Bacuna in extra time in the 3–1 victory over Millwall in the EFL Cup. In the process he became only the third Reading player to make his debut under the age of seventeen. At the end of the month he signed his first professional contract when he turned seventeen. Prolific for the youth team, he was given a chance in the first team under José Gomes and became the youngest Reading player to reach 20 appearances. On 27 April, he scored his first senior goal against Middlesbrough. Namaso was close to a move to Wolverhampton Wanderers before Wolves pulled out of the move due to Reading upping the price at the last moment. A few days later he scored the winning penalty in round 2 of the EFL Cup against Wycombe Wanderers.

=== Porto ===
On 20 August 2020, FC Porto announced the signing of Namaso for Porto B, on a two-year contract. He made 32 appearances for the reserve team in his first season, finishing with 8 goals, the highest tally on the team. Namaso began the following season with Porto B and went on to score 15 goals. He was named in the senior squad for the first time for a league match against Boavista on 30 October. He came off the bench late in the match to replace centre-forward Evanilson, and he scored in added time, sealing a 4–1 win.

Namaso started the 2022–23 season by winning the Supertaça Cândido de Oliveira after being handed a surprising first start for Porto in a game that they ran out 3–0 winners over Tondela.

On 23 January 2024, Namaso extended his contract with Porto until June 2028.

=== Auxerre ===
On 17 August 2025, Ligue 1 club AJ Auxerre announced the season-long loan signing of Namaso, with an option to make the move permanent. The move saw Namaso link back up with fellow Reading Academy graduate Gabriel Osho.

On 2 July 2026, Auxerre announced that they had signed Namaso permanently from Porto, on a contract until the summer of 2029.

== International career ==
=== England ===
Namaso was born in England to an English father and a Cameroonian mother. He has represented England at under-16, under-17, under-18, under-19 level and under-20. He was a member of the England U-17 team that came runners-up to Spain in the 2017 UEFA European Under-17 Championship held in May in Croatia, making a total of five appearances in the tournament.

In September 2017, Namaso was called up to England U17 team for the 2017 FIFA U17 World Cup. Loader scored twice in a group stage game against Iraq and came off the bench in the quarter-final against the United States. He did not feature in the final as England defeated Spain to lift the trophy.

In September 2018, Namaso scored twice for the England U19 team against the Netherlands.

On 28 May 2019, Namaso was called up to the England U20 for the 2019 Toulon Tournament. He scored his first goal for the U20 age group on his ninth appearance; a 3–0 win over Iceland U21s at Wycombe on 19 November 2019.

=== Cameroon ===
In January 2025, he received clearance from FIFA that his change of international allegiance from England to Cameroon had gone through, leaving him eligible to represent the Cameroon national team. On 5 March 2025, Namaso was called up to the Cameroon national team for the first time, for their World Cup qualifiers against Eswatini and Libya. He made his debut on 19 March 2025 in a 0–0 draw against Eswatini, as a half-time substitute for Frank Magri.

== Personal life ==
His brother, Ben Loader, is a professional rugby player with Gloucester Rugby.

Ahead of the 2022–23 season, he stated to the Portuguese press that his preference was to be professionally addressed as Danny Namaso rather than Danny Loader.

== Career statistics ==
=== Club ===
As of match played 18 October 2026

Appearances and goals by club, season and competition
Club	Season	League			National cup (Note: Includes FA Cup, Taça de Portugal)		League cup (Note: Includes EFL Cup, Taça da Liga)		Continental		Other		Total	
Club	Season	Division	Apps	Goals	Apps	Goals	Apps	Goals	Apps	Goals	Apps	Goals	Apps	Goals
Reading U23	2016–17	—			—		—		—		2 (Note: Appearance(s) in EFL Trophy)	0	2	0
Reading	2017–18	Championship	0	0	0	0	1	0	—		—		1	0
Reading	2018–19	Championship	21	1	1	0	0	0	—		—		22	1
Reading	2019–20	Championship	7	0	3	1	2	0	—		—		12	1
Reading	Total		28	1	4	1	3	0	—		—		35	2
Porto B	2020–21	Liga Portugal 2	32	8	—		—		—		—		32	8
Porto B	2021–22	Liga Portugal 2	31	14	—		—		—		—		31	14
Porto B	Total		63	22	—		—		—		—		63	22
Porto	2021–22	Primeira Liga	1	1	0	0	1	0	0	0	—		2	1
Porto	2022–23	Primeira Liga	22	3	5	1	5	3	3 (Note: Appearance(s) in UEFA Champions League)	0	1 (Note: Appearance in Supertaça Cândido de Oliveira)	0	36	7
Porto	2023–24	Primeira Liga	16	1	5	1	1	0	3	0	1	0	26	2
Porto	2024–25	Primeira Liga	29	3	2	0	1	0	8 (Note: Appearances in UEFA Europa League)	1	2 (Note: One appearance in the Supertaça Cândido de Oliveira and one appearance in the FIFA Club World Cup)	0	42	4
Porto	2025–26	Primeira Liga	0	0	0	0	0	0	0	0	—		0	0
Porto	Total		68	8	13	2	8	3	14	1	4	0	106	14
AJ Auxerre (loan)	2025–26	Ligue 1	30	3	0	0	—		—		—		30	3
AJ Auxerre	2026–27	Ligue 1	7	3	0	0	—		—		—		7	3
Career total			196	37	16	3	11	3	14	1	6	0	243	44

=== International ===
As of match played 3 October 2026

Appearances and goals by national team and year
National team	Year	Apps	Goals
Cameroon	2025	8	0
Cameroon	2026	7	1
Total		15	1

Scores and results list Comoros' goal tally first, score column indicates score after each Namaso goal.

List of international goals scored by Danny Namaso
No.	Date	Venue	Opponent	Score	Result	Competition
1	24 September 2026	Roumdé Adjia Stadium, Garoua, Cameroon	Comoros	3–1	3–1	2027 Africa Cup of Nations qualification

== Honours ==
Porto

- Primeira Liga: 2021–22
- Taça de Portugal: 2022–23, 2023–24
- Taça da Liga: 2022–23
- Supertaça Cândido de Oliveira: 2022, 2024

England U17

- FIFA U-17 World Cup: 2017
- UEFA European Under-17 Championship runner-up: 2017
