= Francisco Meixedo =

Portuguese footballer (born 2001)

Personal information
- Full name: Francisco Meira Meixedo
- Date of birth: 19 May 2001 (age 25)
- Place of birth: Porto, Portugal
- Height: 1.90 m (6 ft 3 in)
- Position: Goalkeeper

Team information
- Current team: Feirense
- Number: 1

Youth career
- 2009–2020: Porto
- 2016–2017: → Padroense (loan)

Senior career*
Years	Team	Apps	(Gls)
2019–2024	Porto B	43	(0)
2020–2022	Porto	1	(0)
2024–2025	Estrela Amadora	1	(0)
2025–	Feirense	19	(0)

International career
2018	Portugal U17	1	(0)
2018–2019	Portugal U18	4	(0)
2019	Portugal U19	7	(0)
- * Club domestic league appearances and goals as of 19 June 2026

Francisco Meira Meixedo (born 19 May 2001) is a Portuguese professional footballer who plays as a goalkeeper for Liga Portugal 2 club Feirense.

== Club career ==
Born in Porto, Meixedo spent his entire youth career in the ranks of FC Porto. He made his LigaPro debut for their reserves on 18 August 2019 in a 1–1 home draw against Varzim SC, as a 69th-minute substitute for Rodrigo Valente after the dismissal of Ricardo Silva. The following 26 July he was in the first team's matchday squad for the first time, remaining unused as Diogo Costa played in the 2–1 loss at S.C. Braga on the last day of the season for the Primeira Liga champions.

On 15 April 2021, Meixedo renewed his contract until 2023. He earned a league medal in the 2021–22 campaign, replacing third-choice Cláudio Ramos in the last minute of a 2–0 home win over G.D. Estoril Praia on 14 May.

Meixedo signed for fellow top-flight club C.F. Estrela da Amadora on 14 July 2024, on a three-year deal. He returned to the second tier after only one season, however, joining C.D. Feirense.

== Career statistics ==
As of match played 17 February 2024

Appearances and goals by club, season and competition
Club	Season	League			National cup		League cup		Continental		Other		Total	
Club	Season	Division	Apps	Goals	Apps	Goals	Apps	Goals	Apps	Goals	Apps	Goals	Apps	Goals
Porto B	2019–20	LigaPro	1	0	—		—		—		—		1	0
Porto B	2020–21	Liga Portugal 2	0	0	—		—		—		—		0	0
Porto B	2021–22	Liga Portugal 2	5	0	—		—		—		—		5	0
Porto B	2022–23	Liga Portugal 2	19	0	—		—		—		—		19	0
Porto B	2023–24	Liga Portugal 2	18	0	—		—		—		—		18	0
Porto B	Total		43	0	—		—		—		—		43	0
Porto	2021–22	Primeira Liga	1	0	0	0	0	0	0	0	—		1	0
Porto	2022–23	Primeira Liga	0	0	0	0	0	0	0	0	0	0	0	0
Porto	2023–24	Primeira Liga	0	0	0	0	0	0	0	0	0	0	0	0
Porto	Total		1	0	0	0	0	0	0	0	0	0	1	0
Career Total			44	0	0	0	0	0	0	0	0	0	44	0

== Honours ==
Porto Youth

- UEFA Youth League: 2018–19

Porto

- Primeira Liga: 2021–22
