= Pepê (footballer, born 1997) =

Brazilian footballer

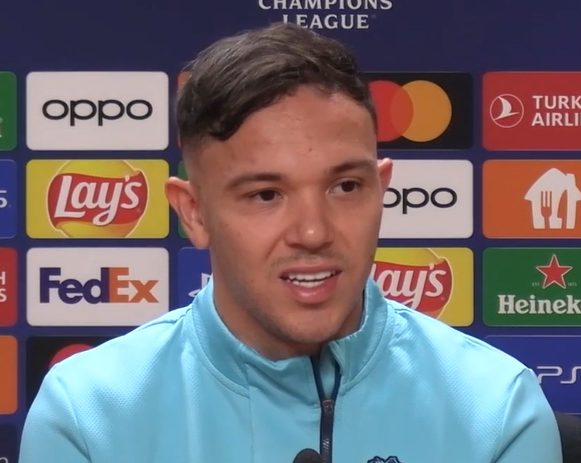
- Pepê during a pre-match interview with Porto in 2023

Personal information
- Full name: Eduardo Gabriel Aquino Cossa
- Date of birth: 24 February 1997 (age 29)
- Place of birth: Foz do Iguaçu, Brazil
- Height: 1.75 m (5 ft 9 in)
- Positions: Winger; right-back

Team information
- Current team: Porto
- Number: 11

Youth career
- 2014–2016: Foz do Iguaçu
- 2016: → Coritiba (loan)
- 2016–2018: Grêmio

Senior career*
Years	Team	Apps	(Gls)
2015–2016	Foz do Iguaçu	14	(5)
2017–2021	Grêmio	113	(27)
2021–	Porto	168	(18)

International career^{‡}
2020	Brazil U23	6	(3)
2023–2024	Brazil	2	(0)
- * Club domestic league appearances and goals as of 19:19, 8 November 2026 (UTC) ‡ National team caps and goals as of 19:19, 25 August 2026 (UTC)

Eduardo Gabriel Aquino Cossa (born 24 February 1997), commonly known as Pepê, is a Brazilian professional footballer who plays for Primeira Liga club Porto and the Brazil national team. Mainly a winger, he can also play as a right-back.

Formed at Foz do Iguaçu, he spent five years at Grêmio, where he made 144 appearances and scored 32 goals, while winning the Campeonato Gaúcho four consecutive times.

== Club career ==
=== Foz do Iguaçu ===
Born in Foz do Iguaçu, Paraná state, Pepê graduated from the youth academy of hometown club Foz do Iguaçu Futebol Clube and spent part of the 2016 season with Coritiba. Ahead of the 2015 season, he was promoted to the senior team. During the 2016 Paranaense, he scored three goals including a brace against Paraná.

=== Grêmio ===
On 4 April 2016, Pepê joined Série A side Grêmio. On 28 May 2017, he made his Série A debut, coming on as a substitute for Everton in a 4–3 victory against Sport Recife. On 3 December, he scored his first goal for the club in a 4–3 defeat against Atlético Mineiro.

On 8 January 2018, Pepê extended his contract until 2020. On 7 August, he made his Copa Libertadores debut, starting in a 2–1 defeat against Argentinian club Estudiantes. His contract was further extended to 2022 on 26 September.

Pepê scored three goals in eight games as the team from Porto Alegre made the quarter-finals of the 2020 Copa Libertadores, including the only goal of an away win over Grenal rivals Internacional on 23 September in the group stage. In the reverse fixture on 12 March, he came on as a substitute and was one of eight players – split equally between the two teams – to be sent off in a brawl. In the year's national championship, he scored nine times, a personal best, including one in a draw away to Inter on 3 October and two in a 3–1 win over Botafogo eleven days later.

=== Porto ===
On 18 February 2021, Pepê signed with Primeira Liga side FC Porto, on a contract effective from 1 July and lasting until 2026. The €15 million fee was paid 70% to Grêmio and the remainder to Foz do Iguaçu, to be issued in four installments over the following two years; Grêmio would receive 12.5% of a future sale. He made his debut on 8 August, replacing Mehdi Taremi for the last eight minutes of a 2–0 home win over Belenenses SAD. He scored his first goal on 19 September to conclude a 5–0 win over Moreirense also at the Estádio do Dragão.

On 28 November 2023, he scored his first Champions League goal in a 2–1 away defeat against Barcelona.

== International career ==
Pepê was born in Brazil, and is of Italian descent through his father and Paraguayan descent through his mother. He represented the Brazil U23s for the 2020 CONMEBOL Pre-Olympic Tournament.

On 6 November 2023, Pepê received his first Brazil senior team call-up, ahead of 2026 World Cup qualifiers against Colombia and Argentina. He made his debut against the former, on 17 November, coming off the bench to replace Renan Lodi in the 81st minute of a 2–1 away loss.

== Career statistics ==
=== Club ===
As of match played 20 November 2026

Appearances and goals by club, season and competition
Club	Season	League			State league (Note: Includes Campeonato Paranaense, Campeonato Gaúcho)		National cup (Note: Includes Copa do Brasil and Taça de Portugal)		League cup (Note: Includes Taça da Liga)		Continental		Other		Total	
Club	Season	Division	Apps	Goals	Apps	Goals	Apps	Goals	Apps	Goals	Apps	Goals	Apps	Goals	Apps	Goals
Foz do Iguaçu	2015	Série D	5	2	2	0	0	0	—		—		—		7	2
Foz do Iguaçu	2016	Série D	0	0	7	3	0	0	—		—		—		7	3
Foz do Iguaçu	Total		5	2	9	3	0	0	—		—		—		14	5
Grêmio	2017	Série A	3	1	—		0	0	—		0	0	—		3	1
Grêmio	2018	Série A	20	2	4	0	1	0	—		3 (Note: Appearances in Copa Libertadores)	0	—		28	2
Grêmio	2019	Série A	32	8	10	4	5	0	—		4	1	—		51	13
Grêmio	2020	Série A	31	9	10	3	8	0	—		8	3	—		57	15
Grêmio	2021	Série A	0	0	3	0	0	0	—		2 (Note: One appearance in Copa Libertadores, one appearance and one goal in Copa Sudamericana)	1	—		5	1
Grêmio	Total		86	20	27	7	14	0	—		17	5	—		144	32
Porto	2021–22	Primeira Liga	28	4	—		5	0	2	1	7 (Note: Three appearances in UEFA Champions League, four appearances and one goal in UEFA Europa League)	1	—		42	6
Porto	2022–23	Primeira Liga	34	4	—		6	0	6	1	8 (Note: Appearances in UEFA Champions League)	0	1 (Note: Appearance in Supertaça Cândido de Oliveira)	0	55	5
Porto	2023–24	Primeira Liga	34	4	—		6	2	2	1	7	1	1	0	50	8
Porto	2024–25	Primeira Liga	31	3	—		1	1	1	0	10 (Note: Appearances in UEFA Europa League)	1	2 (Note: Appearances in FIFA Club World Cup)	1	45	6
Porto	2025–26	Primeira Liga	30	3	—		6	1	1	0	11	0	—		48	4
Porto	2026–27	Primeira Liga	11	0	—		1	0	1	0	4	0	1	0	18	0
Porto	Total		168	18	—		25	4	13	3	47	3	5	1	258	29
Career total			259	40	36	10	39	4	13	3	64	8	5	1	416	66

=== International ===
As of match played 8 June 2024

Appearances and goals by national team and year
National team	Year	Apps	Goals
Brazil	2023	1	0
Brazil	2024	1	0
Total		2	0

== Honours ==
Grêmio

- Campeonato Gaúcho: 2018, 2019, 2020, 2021
- Copa do Brasil runner-up: 2020

Porto

- Primeira Liga: 2021–22, 2025–26
- Taça de Portugal: 2021–22, 2022–23, 2023–24
- Taça da Liga: 2022–23
- Supertaça Cândido de Oliveira: 2022, 2026
