= 2023–24 FC Porto season =

FC Porto
2023–24 season
- President: Jorge Nuno Pinto da Costa
- Head coach: Sérgio Conceição
- Stadium: Estádio do Dragão
- Primeira Liga: 3rd
- Taça de Portugal: Winners
- Taça da Liga: Group stage
- Supertaça Cândido de Oliveira: Runners-up
- UEFA Champions League: Round of 16
- Top goalscorer: League: Evanilson (13); All: Evanilson (25)
- Average home league attendance: 37,912
Home colours	Away colours	Third colours

The 2023–24 season was the 130th season in the existence of FC Porto and the club's 89th consecutive season in the top flight of Portuguese football. In addition to the domestic league, Porto participated in this season's editions of the Taça de Portugal, Taça da Liga, Supertaça Cândido de Oliveira and UEFA Champions League.

== Players ==
=== Current squad ===
As of 31 January 2024

Note: Flags indicate national team as defined under FIFA eligibility rules; some limited exceptions apply. Players may hold more than one non-FIFA nationality.

No.	Pos.	Nation	Player
2	DF	POR	Fábio Cardoso
3	DF	POR	Pepe (captain)
5	DF	ESP	Iván Marcano (vice-captain)
6	MF	CAN	Stephen Eustáquio
8	MF	SRB	Marko Grujić
9	FW	IRI	Mehdi Taremi
10	FW	POR	Francisco Conceição (on loan from Ajax)
11	DF	BRA	Pepê
12	DF	NGR	Zaidu Sanusi
13	FW	BRA	Galeno
14	GK	POR	Cláudio Ramos
15	DF	MEX	Jorge Sánchez (on loan from Ajax)
16	MF	ESP	Nico González
17	MF	ESP	Iván Jaime
18	DF	BRA	Wendell
19	FW	CMR	Danny Namaso

No.	Pos.	Nation	Player
20	MF	POR	André Franco
22	MF	ARG	Alan Varela
23	DF	POR	João Mário
28	MF	POR	Romário Baró
29	FW	ESP	Toni Martínez
30	FW	BRA	Evanilson
31	DF	BRA	Otávio
55	DF	POR	João Mendes
70	FW	POR	Gonçalo Borges
71	GK	POR	Francisco Meixedo
87	MF	POR	Bernardo Folha
91	GK	POR	Gonçalo Ribeiro
94	GK	BRA	Samuel Portugal
97	DF	POR	Zé Pedro
99	GK	POR	Diogo Costa (3rd captain)

== Technical staff ==
Position	Staff
Head coach	(Portugal) Sérgio Conceição
Assistant coaches	(Portugal) Vítor Bruno
Assistant coaches	(France) Siramana Dembélé
Goalkeeper coaches	(Portugal) Diamantino Figueiredo (Croatia) Vedran Runje
Exercise Physiologist	(Portugal) Eduardo Oliveira
Fitness coach	(Portugal) Telmo Sousa

Source: FC Porto

== Competitions ==
=== Overall record ===
Competition	First match	Last match	Starting round	Final position	Record							
Competition	First match	Last match	Starting round	Final position	Pld	W	D	L	GF	GA	GD	Win %
Primeira Liga	14 August 2023	18 May 2024	Matchday 1	3rd	34	22	6	6	63	27	+36	64.71
Taça de Portugal	20 October 2023	26 May 2024	Third round	Winners	7	7	0	0	18	3	+15	100.00
Taça da Liga	6 December 2023	23 December 2023	Group stage	Group stage	2	1	0	1	3	4	−1	50.00
Supertaça Cândido de Oliveira	9 August 2023		Final	Runners-up	1	0	0	1	0	2	−2	0.00
UEFA Champions League	19 September 2023	12 March 2024	Group stage	Round of 16	8	5	0	3	16	9	+7	62.50
Total					52	35	6	11	100	45	+55	67.31

Source: Soccerway

=== Primeira Liga ===
==== League table ====
Pos	Team	Pld	W	D	L	GF	GA	GD	Pts	Qualification or relegation
1	Sporting CP (C)	34	29	3	2	96	29	+67	90	Qualification for the Champions League league phase (Note: Since Atalanta, the winners of the 2023–24 UEFA Europa League, qualified for the Champions League via league position, Benfica was promoted from the Champions League third qualifying round to the league phase, as the team with the highest coefficient out of all the teams in Champions League qualifying.)
2	Benfica	34	25	5	4	77	28	+49	80	Qualification for the Champions League league phase
3	Porto	34	22	6	6	63	27	+36	72	Qualification for the Europa League league phase (Note: Porto qualified for the Europa League league phase by winning the 2023–24 Taça de Portugal.)
4	Braga	34	21	5	8	71	50	+21	68	Qualification for the Europa League second qualifying round (Note: Since the 2023–24 Taça de Portugal winners, Porto, finished in top three, the spot given to the third-placed team (Europa League second qualifying round) was passed to the fourth-placed team, and the spot given to the fourth-placed team (Conference League second qualifying round) was passed to the fifth-placed team.)
5	Vitória de Guimarães	34	19	6	9	52	38	+14	63	Qualification for the Conference League second qualifying round

Source: Liga Portugal
Rules for classification: 1) Points; 2) Head-to-head points; 3) Head-to-head goal difference; 4) Head-to-head away goals scored; 5) Goal difference; 6) Matches won; 7) Goals scored; 8) Play-off.
(C) Champions

==== Results summary ====
Overall								Home						Away					
Pld	W	D	L	GF	GA	GD	Pts	W	D	L	GF	GA	GD	W	D	L	GF	GA	GD
34	22	6	6	63	27	+36	72	11	4	2	35	13	+22	11	2	4	28	14	+14

Source: Liga Portugal

==== Results by round ====
Round	1	2	3	4	5	6	7	8	9	10	11	12	13	14	15	16	17	18	19	20	21	22	23	24	25	26	27	28	29	30	31	32	33	34
Ground	A	H	A	H	A	H	A	H	A	H	A	A	H	A	H	A	H	H	A	H	A	H	A	H	A	H	A	H	H	A	H	A	H	A
Result	W	W	W	D	W	W	L	W	W	L	W	W	W	L	W	D	W	W	W	D	L	W	D	W	W	W	L	L	D	W	D	W	W	W
Position	8	3	2	2	3	2	3	3	3	3	3	3	2	3	3	3	3	3	3	3	3	3	3	3	3	3	3	3	3	3	3	3	3	3

Source: Liga Portugal
A = Away; H = Home; W = Win; D = Draw; L = Loss

==== Matches ====
14 August 2023 1	Moreirense	1–2	Porto	Moreira de Cónegos
18:45 WEST (UTC+01:00)	Frimpong 51'	Report	Martínez 67'; Wendell 74'	Stadium: Parque Moreira de Cónegos; Attendance: 5,674; Referee: Hélder Malheiro

20 August 2023 2	Porto	2–1	Farense	Porto
18:00 WEST (UTC+01:00)	Martínez 13'; Marcano 90+10'	Report	Costa 45+1'	Stadium: Estádio do Dragão; Attendance: 48,129; Referee: Cláudio Pereira

28 August 2023 3	Rio Ave	1–2	Porto	Vila do Conde
20:15 WEST (UTC+01:00)	Costinha 52' (pen.)	Report	Galeno 90+1' (pen.); Marcano 90+4'	Stadium: Estádio dos Arcos; Attendance: 4,811; Referee: Fábio Veríssimo

3 September 2023 4	Porto	1–1	Arouca	Porto
18:00 WEST (UTC+01:00)	Evanilson 90+19'	Report	González 84'	Stadium: Estádio do Dragão; Attendance: 46,516; Referee: Miguel Nogueira

15 September 2023 5	Estrela da Amadora	0–1	Porto	Amadora
19:15 WEST (UTC+01:00)		Report	Taremi 29'	Stadium: Estádio José Gomes; Attendance: 5,976; Referee: João Pinheiro

23 September 2023 6	Porto	2–1	Gil Vicente	Porto
20:30 WEST (UTC+01:00)	Jaime 8'; Eustáquio 90+1'	Report	Depú 37'	Stadium: Estádio do Dragão; Attendance: 37,617; Referee: António Nobre

29 September 2023 7	Benfica	1–0	Porto	Lisbon
20:15 WEST (UTC+01:00)	Di María 68'	Report		Stadium: Estádio da Luz; Attendance: 62,247; Referee: João Pinheiro

8 October 2023 8	Porto	1–0	Portimonense	Porto
18:00 WEST (UTC+01:00)	Evanilson 9'	Report		Stadium: Estádio do Dragão; Attendance: 43,230; Referee: Nuno Almeida

29 October 2023 9	Vizela	0–2	Porto	Vizela
20:30 WET (UTC±00:00)		Report	Taremi 22' (pen.); Eustáquio 44'	Stadium: Estádio do FC Vizela; Attendance: 4,435; Referee: Manuel Oliveira

3 November 2023 10	Porto	0–1	Estoril	Porto
20:15 WET (UTC±00:00)		Report	Holsgrove 75'	Stadium: Estádio do Dragão; Attendance: 30,306; Referee: Tiago Martins

11 November 2023 11	Vitória de Guimarães	1–2	Porto	Guimarães
20:30 WET (UTC±00:00)	Silva 17'	Report	Sanusi 39'; Conceição 59'	Stadium: Estádio D. Afonso Henriques; Attendance: 21,353; Referee: Nuno Almeida

2 December 2023 12	Famalicão	0–3	Porto	Vila Nova de Famalicão
18:00 WET (UTC±00:00)		Report	Evanilson 9'; Taremi 45+4'; Conceição 87'	Stadium: Estádio Municipal 22 de Junho; Attendance: 4,858; Referee: António Nobre

9 December 2023 13	Porto	3–1	Casa Pia	Porto
20:30 WET (UTC±00:00)	Evanilson 12'; Zé Pedro 49'; Pepe 81'	Report	Andrade 89'	Stadium: Estádio do Dragão; Attendance: 29,130; Referee: João Gonçalves

18 December 2023 14	Sporting CP	2–0	Porto	Lisbon
20:15 WET (UTC±00:00)	Gyökeres 11'; Gonçalves 60'	Report		Stadium: Estádio José Alvalade; Attendance: 44,385; Referee: Nuno Almeida

29 December 2023 15	Porto	1–0	Chaves	Porto
20:45 WET (UTC±00:00)	João Mário 58'	Report		Stadium: Estádio do Dragão; Attendance: 41,529; Referee: Gustavo Correia

5 January 2024 16	Boavista	1–1	Porto	Porto
20:45 WET (UTC±00:00)	Lourenço 28'	Report	Martínez 23'	Stadium: Estádio do Bessa; Attendance: 13,945; Referee: Manuel Oliveira

14 January 2024 17	Porto	2–0	Braga	Porto
20:30 WET (UTC±00:00)	Cardoso 12'; Evanilson 49' (pen.)	Report		Stadium: Estádio do Dragão; Attendance: 41,402; Referee: Artur Soares Dias

20 January 2024 18	Porto	5–0	Moreirense	Porto
20:30 WET (UTC±00:00)	Wendell 8', 72'; Evanilson 60'; Galeno 69'; Varela 83'	Report		Stadium: Estádio do Dragão; Attendance: 34,218; Referee: Luís Godinho

28 January 2024 19	Farense	1–3	Porto	Faro
18:00 WET (UTC±00:00)	Duarte 59' (pen.)	Report	Evanilson 35', 76'; Varela 41'	Stadium: Estádio de São Luís; Attendance: 6,356; Referee: João Pinheiro

3 February 2024 20	Porto	0–0	Rio Ave	Porto
20:30 WET (UTC±00:00)		Report		Stadium: Estádio do Dragão; Attendance: 39,330; Referee: António Nobre

12 February 2024 21	Arouca	3–2	Porto	Arouca
20:15 WET (UTC±00:00)	Mújica 1'; González 30' (pen.); Jason 60'	Report	Evanilson 9' (pen.); Conceição 86'	Stadium: Estádio Municipal de Arouca; Attendance: 3,157; Referee: Nuno Almeida

17 February 2024 22	Porto	2–0	Estrela da Amadora	Porto
20:30 WET (UTC±00:00)	Galeno 35'; João Mário 56'	Report		Stadium: Estádio do Dragão; Attendance: 30,613; Referee: Tiago Martins

25 February 2024 23	Gil Vicente	1–1	Porto	Barcelos
18:00 WET (UTC±00:00)	Luciano 90+4'	Report	Evanilson 55'	Stadium: Estádio Cidade de Barcelos; Attendance: 7,121; Referee: Fábio Veríssimo

3 March 2024 24	Porto	5–0	Benfica	Porto
20:30 WET (UTC±00:00)	Galeno 20', 44'; Wendell 55'; Pepê 75'; Namaso 90'	Report		Stadium: Estádio do Dragão; Attendance: 49,013; Referee: João Pinheiro

8 March 2024 25	Portimonense	0–3	Porto	Portimão
18:45 WET (UTC±00:00)		Report	González 7'; Galeno 59'; Pepê 79'	Stadium: Estádio Municipal de Portimão; Attendance: 2,811; Referee: Artur Soares Dias

16 March 2024 26	Porto	4–1	Vizela	Porto
20:30 WET (UTC±00:00)	Conceição 54'; Pepê 68'; Evanilson 77'; Martínez 89'	Report	Pepe 17' (o.g.)	Stadium: Estádio do Dragão; Attendance: 30,117; Referee: João Gonçalves

30 March 2024 27	Estoril	1–0	Porto	Estoril
20:30 WET (UTC±00:00)	Cassiano 69'	Report		Stadium: Estádio António Coimbra da Mota; Attendance: 4,578; Referee: António Nobre

7 April 2024 28	Porto	1–2	Vitória de Guimarães	Porto
20:30 WEST (UTC+01:00)	Galeno 44'	Report	Galeno 12' (o.g.); Jota Silva 33'	Stadium: Estádio do Dragão; Attendance: 34,582; Referee: Fábio Veríssimo

13 April 2024 29	Porto	2–2	Famalicão	Porto
18:00 WEST (UTC+01:00)	Youssouf 17' (o.g.); Taremi 82'	Report	Cádiz 9', 45+1'	Stadium: Estádio do Dragão; Attendance: 30,510; Referee: Gustavo Correia

21 April 2024 30	Casa Pia	1–2	Porto	Lisbon
18:00 WEST (UTC+01:00)	Moreira 37'	Report	Galeno 31'; González 56'	Stadium: Estádio Pina Manique; Attendance: 3,387; Referee: Manuel Oliveira

28 April 2024 31	Porto	2–2	Sporting CP	Porto
20:30 WEST (UTC+01:00)	Evanilson 7'; Pepê 40'	Report	Gyökeres 87', 88'	Stadium: Estádio do Dragão; Attendance: 45,230; Referee: Nuno Almeida

4 May 2024 32	Chaves	0–3	Porto	Chaves
20:30 WEST (UTC+01:00)		Report	Conceição 27'; Evanilson 45+1'; Taremi 73' (pen.)	Stadium: Estádio Municipal de Chaves; Attendance: 3,439; Referee: José Bessa

12 May 2024 33	Porto	2–1	Boavista	Porto
20:30 WEST (UTC+01:00)	Zé Pedro 81'; Taremi 90+8'	Report	Lourenço 60'	Stadium: Estádio do Dragão; Attendance: 33,031; Referee: Artur Soares Dias

18 May 2024 34	Braga	0–1	Porto	Braga
20:30 WEST (UTC+01:00)		Report	Galeno 84'	Stadium: Estádio Municipal de Braga; Attendance: 23,284; Referee: Nuno Almeida

=== Taça de Portugal ===
20 October 2023 Third round	Vilar de Perdizes	0–2	Porto	Chaves
20:45 WEST (UTC+01:00)		Report	Franco 36'; Evanilson 65'	Stadium: Estádio Municipal de Chaves; Referee: Carlos Macedo

24 November 2023 Fourth round	Porto	4–0	Montalegre	Porto
20:45 WET (UTC±00:00)	Loader 13'; Evanilson 18', 44'; Navarro 62'	Report		Stadium: Estádio do Dragão; Referee: Hélder Carvalho

9 January 2024 Fifth round	Estoril	0–4	Porto	Estoril
20:45 WET (UTC±00:00)			Evanilson 24', 31' (pen.), 56'; Galeno 76'	Stadium: Estádio António Coimbra da Mota; Referee: Fábio Veríssimo

29 February 2024 Quarter-finals	Santa Clara	1–2	Porto	Ponta Delgada
15:00 AZOT (UTC-01:00)	Rafael Martins 27'	Report	Evanilson 52'; Galeno 61'	Stadium: Estádio de São Miguel; Referee: Gustavo Correia

3 April 2024 Semi-finals; First leg	Vitória de Guimarães	0–1	Porto	Guimarães
20:15 WEST (UTC+01:00)		Report	Pepê 52'	Stadium: Estádio D. Afonso Henriques; Attendance: 18,103; Referee: Nuno Almeida

17 April 2024 Semi-finals; Second leg	Porto	3–1 (4–1 agg.)	Vitória de Guimarães	Porto
20:15 WEST (UTC+1)	Taremi 26' (pen.); Conceição 45+5'; Pepê 75'	Report	Freitas 1'	Stadium: Estádio do Dragão; Attendance: 30,609; Referee: Artur Soares Dias

26 May 2024 Final	Porto	2–1 (a.e.t.)	Sporting CP	Oeiras
17:15 WEST (UTC+1)	Evanilson 25'; Taremi 100' (pen.)	Report	St. Juste 20'	Stadium: Estádio Nacional; Attendance: 37,593; Referee: Fábio Veríssimo

=== Taça da Liga ===
==== Third round ====
Pos	Team	Pld	W	D	L	GF	GA	GD	Pts	Qualification	EST	POR	LEI
1	Estoril	2	2	0	0	5	2	+3	6	Advance to knockout phase	—	3–1	—
2	Porto	2	1	0	1	3	4	−1	3		—	—	2–1
3	Leixões	2	0	0	2	2	4	−2	0		1–2	—	—

Source: Liga Portugal
Rules for classification: Tiebreakers

6 December 2023 2	Estoril	3–1	Porto	Estoril
18:00 WET (UTC±0)	Cassiano 22'; Guitane 90+1'; João Carlos 90+5' (pen.)	Report	Pepê 34'	Stadium: Estádio António Coimbra da Mota; Attendance: 2,684; Referee: Hélder Malheiro

23 December 2023 3	Porto	2–1	Leixões	Porto
20:30 WET (UTC±0)	Conceição 7'; Taremi 85' (pen.)	Report	Fabinho 14' (pen.)	Stadium: Estádio do Dragão; Attendance: 30,210; Referee: José Bessa

=== Supertaça Cândido de Oliveira ===
9 August 2023 Final	Benfica	2–0	Porto	Aveiro
20:45 WEST (UTC+01:00)	Di María 61'; Musa 68'			Stadium: Estádio Municipal de Aveiro; Attendance: 30,300; Referee: Luís Godinho (Évora)

=== UEFA Champions League ===
==== Group stage ====
Pos	Team	Pld	W	D	L	GF	GA	GD	Pts	Qualification	BAR	POR	SHK	ANT
1	(Spain) Barcelona	6	4	0	2	12	6	+6	12 (Note: Head-to-head points: Barcelona 6, Porto 0.)	Advance to knockout phase	—	2–1	2–1	5–0
2	(Portugal) Porto	6	4	0	2	15	8	+7	12	Advance to knockout phase	0–1	—	5–3	2–0
3	(Ukraine) Shakhtar Donetsk	6	3	0	3	10	12	−2	9	Transfer to Europa League	1–0	1–3	—	1–0
4	(Belgium) Antwerp	6	1	0	5	6	17	−11	3		3–2	1–4	2–3	—

Source: UEFA
Rules for classification: Group stage tiebreakers
Notes:

19 September 2023 1	Shakhtar Donetsk (Ukraine)	1–3	(Portugal) Porto	Hamburg, Germany
21:00 CEST (UTC+2)	Kelsy 13'	Report	Galeno 8', 15'; Taremi 29'	Stadium: Volksparkstadion; Attendance: 46,729; Referee: Davide Massa (Italy)

4 October 2023 2	Porto (Portugal)	0–1	(Spain) Barcelona	Porto, Portugal
20:00 WEST (UTC+1)		Report	Torres 45+1'	Stadium: Estádio do Dragão; Attendance: 49,722; Referee: Anthony Taylor (England)

25 October 2023 3	Antwerp (Belgium)	1–4	(Portugal) Porto	Antwerp, Belgium
21:00 CEST (UTC+2)	Yusuf 37'	Report	Evanilson 46', 69', 84'; Eustáquio 54'	Stadium: Bosuilstadion; Attendance: 13,651; Referee: Benoît Bastien (France)

7 November 2023 4	Porto (Portugal)	2–0	(Belgium) Antwerp	Porto, Portugal
20:00 WET (UTC±0)	Evanilson 13'; Pepe 90+1'	Report		Stadium: Estádio do Dragão; Attendance: 44,830; Referee: Maurizio Mariani (Italy)

28 November 2023 5	Barcelona (Spain)	2–1	(Portugal) Porto	Barcelona, Spain
21:00 CET (UTC+1)	Cancelo 32'; Félix 57'	Report	Pepê 30'	Stadium: Estadi Olímpic Lluís Companys; Attendance: 43,533; Referee: Daniele Orsato (Italy)

13 December 2023 6	Porto (Portugal)	5–3	(Ukraine) Shakhtar Donetsk	Porto, Portugal
20:00 WET (UTC±0)	Galeno 9', 43'; Taremi 62'; Pepe 75'; Conceição 82'	Report	Sikan 29'; Eustáquio 72' (o.g.); Eguinaldo 88'	Stadium: Estádio do Dragão; Attendance: 48,113; Referee: István Kovács (Romania)

==== Knockout phase ====
===== Round of 16 =====
21 February 2024 First leg	Porto (Portugal)	1‒0	(England) Arsenal	Porto, Portugal
20:00 WET (UTC±0)	Galeno 90+4'	Report		Stadium: Estádio do Dragão; Attendance: 49,111; Referee: Serdar Gözübüyük (Netherlands)

12 March 2024 Second leg	Arsenal (England)	1–0 (a.e.t.) (1–1 agg.) (4–2 p)	(Portugal) Porto	London, England
20:00 GMT (UTC±0)	Trossard 41'	Report		Stadium: Emirates Stadium; Attendance: 60,257; Referee: Clément Turpin (France)
	Penalties
	Ødegaard (penalty scored); Havertz (penalty scored); Saka (penalty scored); Rice (penalty scored)		Pepê (penalty scored); Wendell (penalty missed); Grujić (penalty scored); Galeno (penalty missed)

== Statistics ==
=== Appearances and goals ===
No.	Pos	Nat	Player	Total		Primeira Liga		Taça de Portugal		Taça da Liga		Supertaça Cândido de Oliveira		Champions League	
No.	Pos	Nat	Player	Apps	Goals	Apps	Goals	Apps	Goals	Apps	Goals	Apps	Goals	Apps	Goals
Goalkeepers
14	GK	(Portugal) POR	Cláudio Ramos	8	0	1+1	0	4	0	2	0	0	0	0	0
71	GK	(Portugal) POR	Francisco Meixedo	0	0	0	0	0	0	0	0	0	0	0	0
94	GK	(Brazil) BRA	Samuel Portugal	0	0	0	0	0	0	0	0	0	0	0	0
99	GK	(Portugal) POR	Diogo Costa	45	0	33	0	3	0	0	0	1	0	8	0
Defenders
2	DF	(Portugal) POR	Fábio Cardoso	28	1	14+4	1	4	0	2	0	0	0	4	0
3	DF	(Portugal) POR	Pepe	34	3	22	1	4	0	0	0	1	0	7	2
5	DF	(Spain) ESP	Iván Marcano	6	2	5	2	0	0	0	0	1	0	0	0
12	DF	(Nigeria) NGR	Zaidu Sanusi	10	1	5	1	0	0	0	0	1	0	4	0
15	DF	(Mexico) MEX	Jorge Sánchez	22	0	6+8	0	1+1	0	0+1	0	0	0	1+4	0
18	DF	(Brazil) BRA	Wendell	35	4	23+2	4	5	0	0+1	0	0	0	4	0
23	DF	(Portugal) POR	João Mário	44	2	25+2	2	6+1	0	1	0	0+1	0	7+1	0
31	DF	(Brazil) BRA	Otávio	17	0	11+1	0	3	0	0	0	0	0	2	0
52	DF	(Portugal) POR	Martim Fernandes	6	0	4	0	0+2	0	0	0	0	0	0	0
55	DF	(Portugal) POR	João Mendes	9	0	3+2	0	1+1	0	2	0	0	0	0	0
72	DF	(Portugal) POR	Rodrigo Pinheiro	0	0	0	0	0	0	0	0	0	0	0	0
97	DF	(Portugal) POR	Zé Pedro	17	2	9+3	2	3	0	2	0	0	0	0	0
Midfielders
6	DF	(Canada) CAN	Stephen Eustáquio	40	3	16+12	2	0+2	0	1	0	1	0	6+2	1
8	MF	(Serbia) SRB	Marko Grujić	21	0	3+7	0	2+3	0	2	0	1	0	0+3	0
16	MF	(Spain) ESP	Nico González	38	2	20+5	2	6+1	0	0+1	0	0	0	2+3	0
17	MF	(Spain) ESP	Iván Jaime	29	1	5+16	1	0+3	0	1	0	0	0	1+3	0
20	MF	(Portugal) POR	André Franco	23	1	5+10	0	2+1	1	1	0	0	0	3+1	0
22	MF	(Argentina) ARG	Alan Varela	44	2	28+2	2	5+1	0	0	0	0	0	8	0
28	MF	(Portugal) POR	Romário Baró	17	0	2+8	0	1+3	0	1	0	0+1	0	1	0
87	MF	(Portugal) POR	Bernardo Folha	0	0	0	0	0	0	0	0	0	0	0	0
Forwards
9	FW	(Iran) IRI	Mehdi Taremi	35	11	15+8	6	1+1	2	1+1	1	1	0	6+1	2
10	FW	(Portugal) POR	Francisco Conceição	42	8	21+6	5	4+2	1	2	1	0	0	2+5	1
11	FW	(Brazil) BRA	Pepê	50	8	32+2	4	6	2	1+1	1	1	0	7	1
13	FW	(Brazil) BRA	Galeno	45	16	20+8	10	7	1	1+1	0	1	0	7	5
19	FW	(Cameroon) CMR	Danny Loader	26	2	1+15	1	2+3	1	1	0	1	0	0+3	0
29	FW	(Spain) ESP	Toni Martínez	25	4	5+15	4	0+1	0	0+1	0	0+1	0	0+2	0
30	FW	(Brazil) BRA	Evanilson	42	25	24+3	13	5+1	8	0+2	0	0	0	5+2	4
70	FW	(Portugal) POR	Gonçalo Borges	28	0	1+17	0	2+4	0	0+1	0	0+1	0	0+2	0
Players who made an appearance and/or had a squad number but left the team.
4	DF	(Portugal) POR	David Carmo	12	0	7	0	0	0	1	0	0	0	4	0
7	FW	(Brazil) BRA	Gabriel Veron	0	0	0	0	0	0	0	0	0	0	0	0
21	FW	(Spain) ESP	Fran Navarro	10	1	1+5	0	1+1	1	0	0	0+1	0	0+1	0
25	MF	(Portugal) POR	Otávio	2	0	1	0	0	0	0	0	1	0	0	0
