= Wendell (footballer, born 1993) =

Brazilian footballer

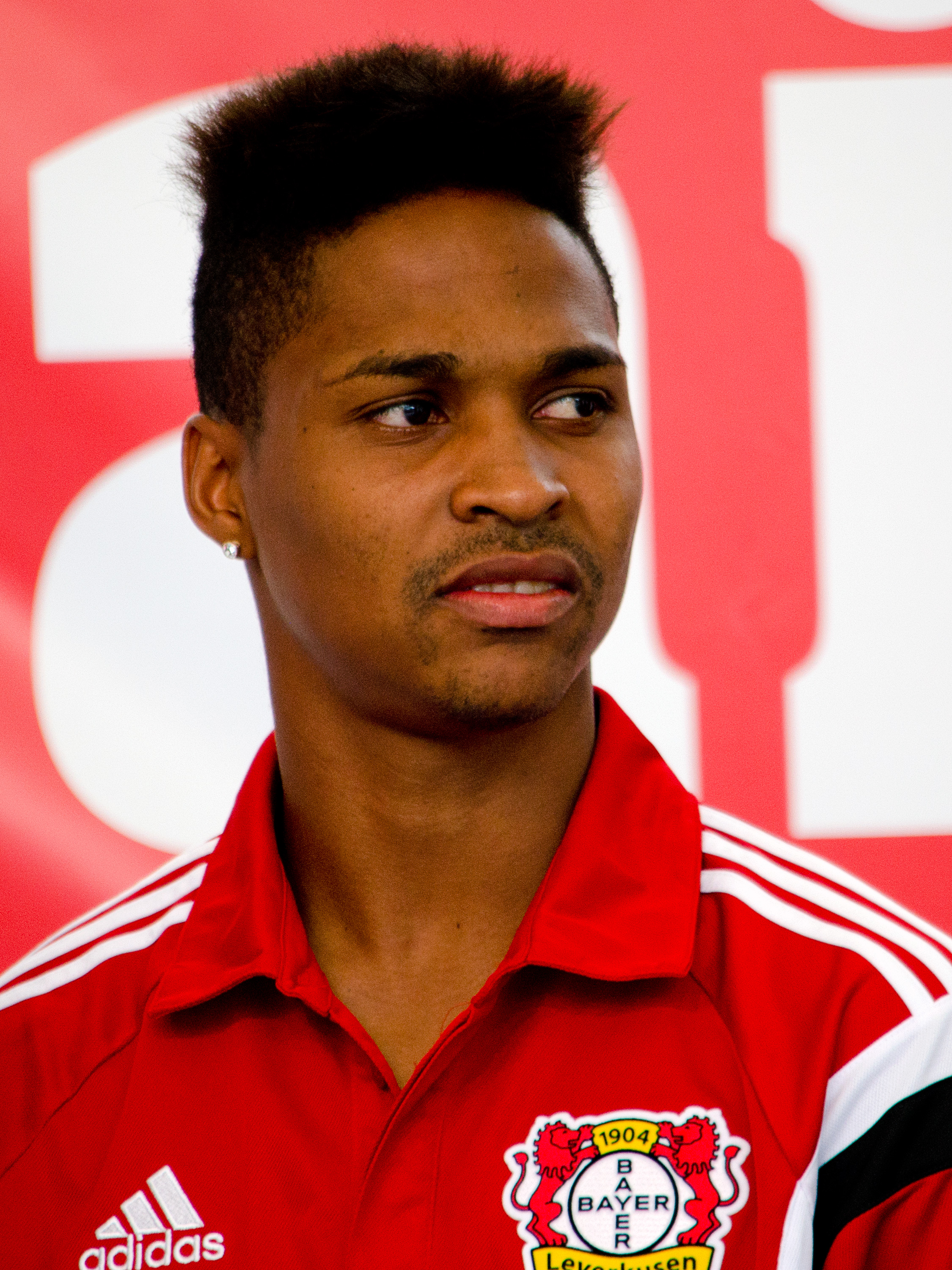
- Wendell with Bayer Leverkusen in 2014

Personal information
- Full name: Wendell Nascimento Borges
- Date of birth: 20 July 1993 (age 33)
- Place of birth: Fortaleza, Brazil
- Height: 1.76 m (5 ft 9 in)
- Position: Left-back

Team information
- Current team: São Paulo
- Number: 18

Youth career
- –2011: Iraty

Senior career*
| Years | Team | Apps | (Gls) |
| 2011 | Iraty | 11 | (0) |
| 2012–2013 | Londrina | 40 | (3) |
| 2012 | → Paraná (loan) | 15 | (0) |
| 2013–2014 | Grêmio | 24 | (1) |
| 2014–2021 | Bayer Leverkusen | 186 | (7) |
| 2021–2025 | Porto | 71 | (6) |
| 2025– | São Paulo | 29 | (0) |

International career
| 2014 | Brazil U20 | 4 | (0) |
| 2014–2016 | Brazil U23 | 8 | (0) |
| 2016–2024 | Brazil | 6 | (0) |
- * Club domestic league appearances and goals as of 6 April 2026

Wendell Nascimento Borges (born 20 July 1993), commonly known as Wendell, is a Brazilian professional footballer who plays as a left-back for Campeonato Brasileiro Série A club São Paulo.

He began his career with Iraty, Londrina and Paraná of the Campeonato Paranaense and Campeonato Brasileiro Série B before transferring to Grêmio in 2013, where he debuted in the Campeonato Brasileiro Série A. In 2014 he signed for Bayer 04 Leverkusen of the German Bundesliga, playing 250 official games over seven years, a club record for a foreigner. He signed for Porto in 2021 for a fee of €4 million, where he won one Primeira Liga title and the Taça de Portugal three times. At the start of 2025, he joined São Paulo.

Wendell played six games for Brazil in 2024, including at the 2024 Copa América.

== Club career ==
=== Early career ===
Born in Fortaleza, Ceará, Wendell grew up in Camaçari near Salvador, Bahia. At age 14, he began his career at Iraty in Paraná. Remaining in the same state, he played for Londrina and Paraná Clube, the latter on loan in 2012 for the Campeonato Brasileiro Série B season. During Wendell's time at Londrina, he gained 4 kg in weight to supplement his light frame, and trained to improve his marking. He almost gave up his career after his father suffered a stroke in 2010, but was advised to continue by his mother.

In June 2013, having been voted the best of his position in the Campeonato Paranaense, Wendell was loaned to Campeonato Brasileiro Série A club Grêmio for the rest of the calendar year. He made his top-flight debut on 11 September as a starter in a 2–0 win at Náutico, due to Alex Telles's injury, and totalled nine appearances as the club from Porto Alegre finished runners-up and qualified for the Copa Libertadores.

After Telles was sold to Galatasaray, Grêmio signed Wendell to a permanent four-year contract, obtaining 65% of his economic rights. On 2 February 2014, he scored his only goal for the club as an equaliser in a 1–1 draw at Juventude in the Campeonato Gaúcho, as his team finished runners-up.

=== Bayer Leverkusen ===
On 27 February 2014, Wendell signed a five-year deal at Bayer 04 Leverkusen of the German Bundesliga, effective from July. He had been recommended to make the transfer by his Grêmio teammate Zé Roberto, who had spent several years at the club. He made his debut for the team on 15 August, replacing Sebastian Boenisch for the last 19 minutes of a 6–0 win away to sixth-tier SV Alemannia Waldalgesheim in the first round of the DFB-Pokal. His Bundesliga debut came on 21 September, playing the entirety of a 1–4 defeat at VfL Wolfsburg. On 13 March 2015 he scored his first goal for the club, opening a 4–0 home win over VfB Stuttgart.

In 2016, Wendell extended his contract to 2021. With a year remaining of that deal, it was prolonged to 2022. He played in the 2020 DFB-Pokal final, being booked after 29 minutes for a foul on Leon Goretzka in a 4–2 loss to double winners FC Bayern Munich. He played 250 total games and scored eight goals during his time at the BayArena, surpassing the club record for games by a foreigner held by Romanian Ioan Lupescu with 234.

=== Porto ===
On 19 August 2021, Wendell signed a four-year contract with Primeira Liga club Porto, for a reported fee of €4 million. He made his debut nine days later, replacing Chancel Mbemba in the 86th minute of a 3–0 home win over Arouca. On 2 October, Wendell scored his first goal for the Estádio do Dragão side, in a 2–1 home win over Paços de Ferreira. He was sent off on 7 December in a UEFA Champions League 2–1 group stage loss at home to Atlético Madrid for an arm in the face of Matheus Cunha, only seven minutes after coming on as a substitute for Zaidu Sanusi. He finished his first season with a league and Taça de Portugal double, though he started at left-back less often than the Nigerian.

Wendell scored in a 4–0 home win over Vizela to help Porto advance to the knockout stages of the Taça da Liga on 16 December 2022, and on 28 January he assisted the opening goal by Stephen Eustáquio in a 2–0 win over Sporting CP in the final at the Estádio Dr. Magalhães Pessoa. On the first day of the 2023–24 Primeira Liga, he scored the winning goal in a 2–1 comeback win away to Moreirense, but was sent off in added time. It was his second consecutive red card, following one in the 2023 Taça de Portugal final victory over Braga; he missed the 2023 Supertaça Cândido de Oliveira as a result of that suspension.

On 20 January 2024, Wendell scored twice in a 4–0 home win over Moreirense, adding another goal on 3 March in a 5–0 victory against title rivals Benfica in O Clássico. He reflected that the latter match was the best moment of his first 100 games for Porto.

=== São Paulo ===
On 6 January 2025, Wendell signed a pre-contract with São Paulo FC, and was originally expected to arrive in July 2025. However, after the arrival of São Paulo players William Gomes and João Moreira to Porto, his immediate release to the Brazilian club was agreed, being officially announced on 4 February.

== International career ==
Wendell got his first call-up to the senior Brazil side for 2018 FIFA World Cup qualifiers against Bolivia and Venezuela in October 2016, replacing Marcelo. He did not make his debut until 23 March 2024, when he played in a 1–0 friendly win over England at Wembley Stadium.

Wendell was called up for the 2024 Copa América in the United States. In the opening goalless draw against Costa Rica, Guilherme Arana played at left back, with Wendell replacing him for a win over Paraguay and draw with Colombia. Arana returned for the quarter-final penalty shootout loss to Uruguay.

== Career statistics ==
=== Club ===
As of match played 24 August 2024

Appearances and goals by club, season and competition
| Club | Season | League | | | National cup | | League cup | | Continental | | Other | | Total | |
| Club | Season | Division | Apps | Goals | Apps | Goals | Apps | Goals | Apps | Goals | Apps | Goals | Apps | Goals |
|---|---|---|---|---|---|---|---|---|---|---|---|---|---|---|
| Iraty | 2011 | — | — | | 1 | 0 | — | | — | | 11 (Note: Appearance(s) in Campeonato Paranaense) | 0 | 12 | 0 |
| Londrina | 2012 | — | — | | — | | — | | — | | 17 | 2 | 17 | 2 |
| Londrina | 2013 | Série D | — | | — | | — | | — | | 23 | 1 | 23 | 1 |
| Londrina | Total | | — | | — | | — | | — | | 40 | 3 | 40 | 3 |
| Paraná Clube (loan) | 2012 | Série B | 15 | 0 | — | | — | | — | | — | | 15 | 0 |
| Grêmio | 2013 | Série A | 9 | 0 | — | | — | | — | | — | | 9 | 0 |
| Grêmio | 2014 | Série A | 2 | 0 | — | | — | | 7 (Note: Appearance(s) in Copa Libertadores) | 0 | 13 (Note: Appearance(s) in Campeonato Gaúcho) | 1 | 22 | 1 |
| Grêmio | Total | | 11 | 0 | — | | — | | 7 | 0 | 13 | 1 | 31 | 1 |
| Bayer Leverkusen | 2014–15 | Bundesliga | 26 | 1 | 3 | 0 | — | | 5 (Note: Appearance(s) in UEFA Champions League) | 0 | — | | 34 | 1 |
| Bayer Leverkusen | 2015–16 | Bundesliga | 28 | 0 | 4 | 0 | — | | 12 (Note: Eight appearances in UEFA Champions League, four appearances in UEFA Europa League) | 0 | — | | 46 | 0 |
| Bayer Leverkusen | 2016–17 | Bundesliga | 32 | 2 | 1 | 0 | — | | 5 | 0 | — | | 38 | 2 |
| Bayer Leverkusen | 2017–18 | Bundesliga | 26 | 2 | 4 | 1 | — | | — | | — | | 30 | 3 |
| Bayer Leverkusen | 2018–19 | Bundesliga | 28 | 2 | 3 | 0 | — | | 8 (Note: Appearance(s) in UEFA Europa League) | 0 | — | | 39 | 2 |
| Bayer Leverkusen | 2019–20 | Bundesliga | 24 | 0 | 4 | 0 | — | | 6 (Note: Four appearances in UEFA Champions League, two appearances in UEFA Europa League) | 0 | — | | 34 | 0 |
| Bayer Leverkusen | 2020–21 | Bundesliga | 22 | 0 | 2 | 0 | — | | 6 | 0 | — | | 30 | 0 |
| Bayer Leverkusen | 2021–22 | Bundesliga | 0 | 0 | 1 | 0 | — | | 0 | 0 | — | | 1 | 0 |
| Bayer Leverkusen | Total | | 186 | 7 | 22 | 1 | — | | 42 | 0 | — | | 250 | 8 |
| Porto | 2021–22 | Primeira Liga | 19 | 1 | 4 | 0 | 0 | 0 | 4 | 0 | — | | 27 | 1 |
| Porto | 2022–23 | Primeira Liga | 26 | 1 | 6 | 0 | 6 | 1 | 6 | 0 | 0 | 0 | 44 | 2 |
| Porto | 2023–24 | Primeira Liga | 25 | 4 | 5 | 0 | 1 | 0 | 5 | 0 | 0 | 0 | 36 | 4 |
| Porto | 2024–25 | Primeira Liga | 1 | 0 | 0 | 0 | 0 | 0 | 0 | 0 | 0 | 0 | 1 | 0 |
| Porto | Total | | 71 | 6 | 15 | 0 | 7 | 1 | 15 | 0 | 0 | 0 | 108 | 7 |
| Career total | | | 283 | 13 | 38 | 1 | 7 | 1 | 64 | 0 | 64 | 4 | 456 | 19 |

=== International ===
As of match played 6 September 2024

Appearances and goals by national team and year
| National team | Year | Apps | Goals |
|---|---|---|---|
| Brazil | 2024 | 6 | 0 |
| Total | | 6 | 0 |

== Honours ==
Londrina

- Campeonato Paranaense do Interior: 2013

Porto

- Primeira Liga: 2021–22
- Taça de Portugal: 2021–22, 2022–23, 2023–24
- Supertaça Cândido de Oliveira: 2022
- Taça da Liga: 2022–23

Brazil U20

- Toulon Tournament: 2014

Individual

- Best Campeonato Paranaense full-back: 2013
- Bundesliga Team of the Season: 2017–18
