= Gabriel Veron =

Brazilian footballer (born 2002)

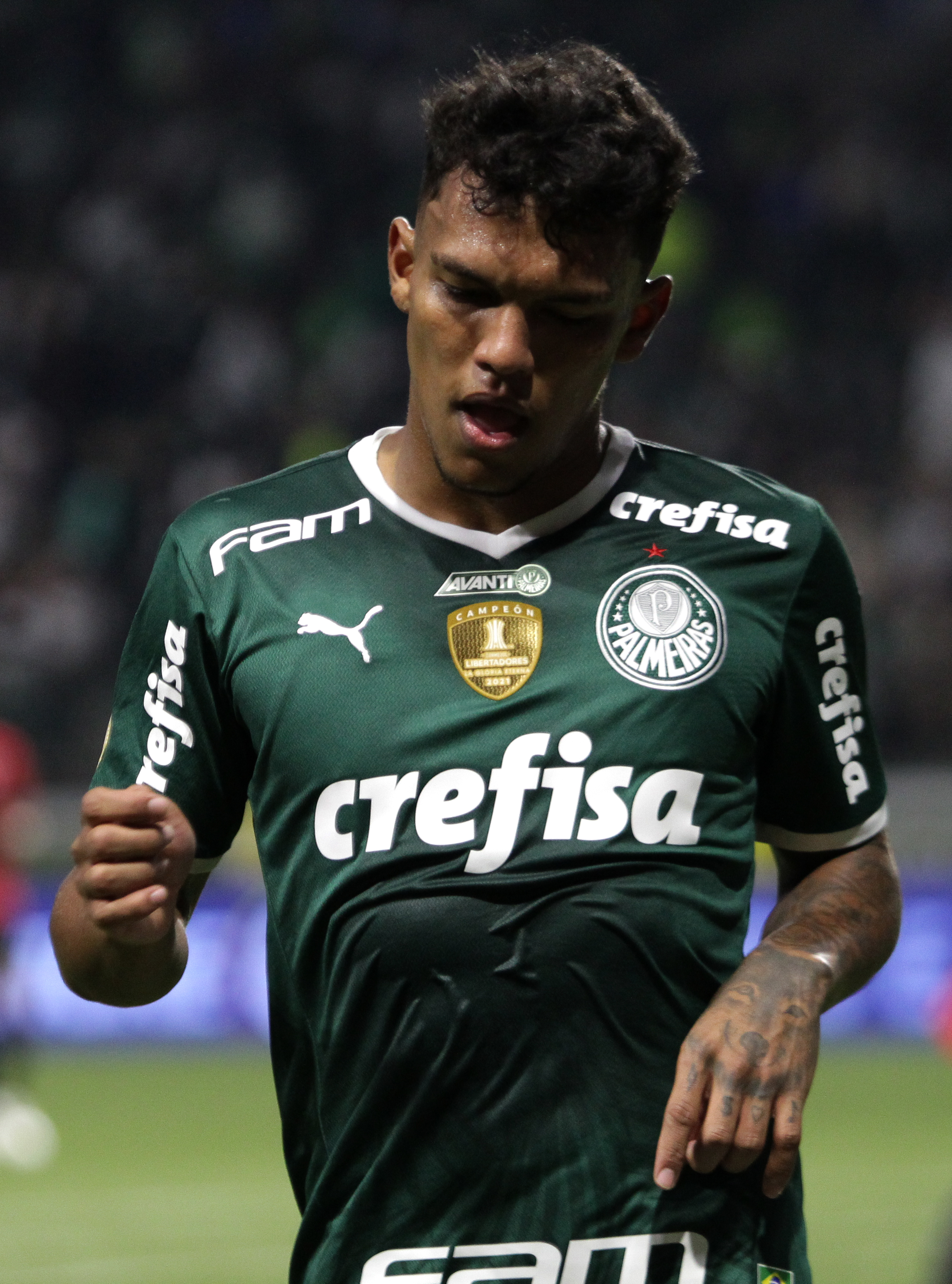
- Veron with Palmeiras in 2022

Personal information
- Full name: Gabriel Veron Fonseca de Souza
- Date of birth: 3 September 2002 (age 24)
- Place of birth: Assu, Brazil
- Height: 1.76 m (5 ft 9 in)
- Positions: Winger; forward

Team information
- Current team: Porto
- Number: 97

Youth career
- 2015–2017: Santa Cruz de Natal
- 2017–2019: Palmeiras

Senior career*
| Years | Team | Apps | (Gls) |
| 2019–2022 | Palmeiras | 68 | (8) |
| 2022– | Porto | 17 | (0) |
| 2023– | Porto B | 2 | (0) |
| 2024 | → Cruzeiro (loan) | 27 | (6) |
| 2025 | → Santos (loan) | 8 | (0) |
| 2025 | → Juventude (loan) | 13 | (0) |
| 2026 | → Nacional (loan) | 13 | (1) |

International career
| 2018–2019 | Brazil U17 | 16 | (5) |
Medal record
Men's football
Representing Brazil
FIFA U17 World Cup
| Winner | 2019 |
- * Club domestic league appearances and goals as of 25 May 2026

Gabriel Veron Fonseca de Souza (born 3 September 2002), known as Gabriel Veron, is a Brazilian professional footballer who plays as a winger or forward for Primeira Liga club Porto.

He began his career at Palmeiras, making 95 appearances and scoring 14 goals, while winning honours including the Copa Libertadores in 2020 and 2021. In 2022, he joined Porto for €10.25 million.

== Early life ==
Veron was born in Assu, Rio Grande do Norte, where he wished to follow his father's career path as a cowboy. His middle name was a tribute to Argentina international Juan Sebastián Verón; a neighbour had three daughters and desired to see a boy named after his favourite player, a wish granted by Veron's mother.

== Club career ==
=== Palmeiras ===
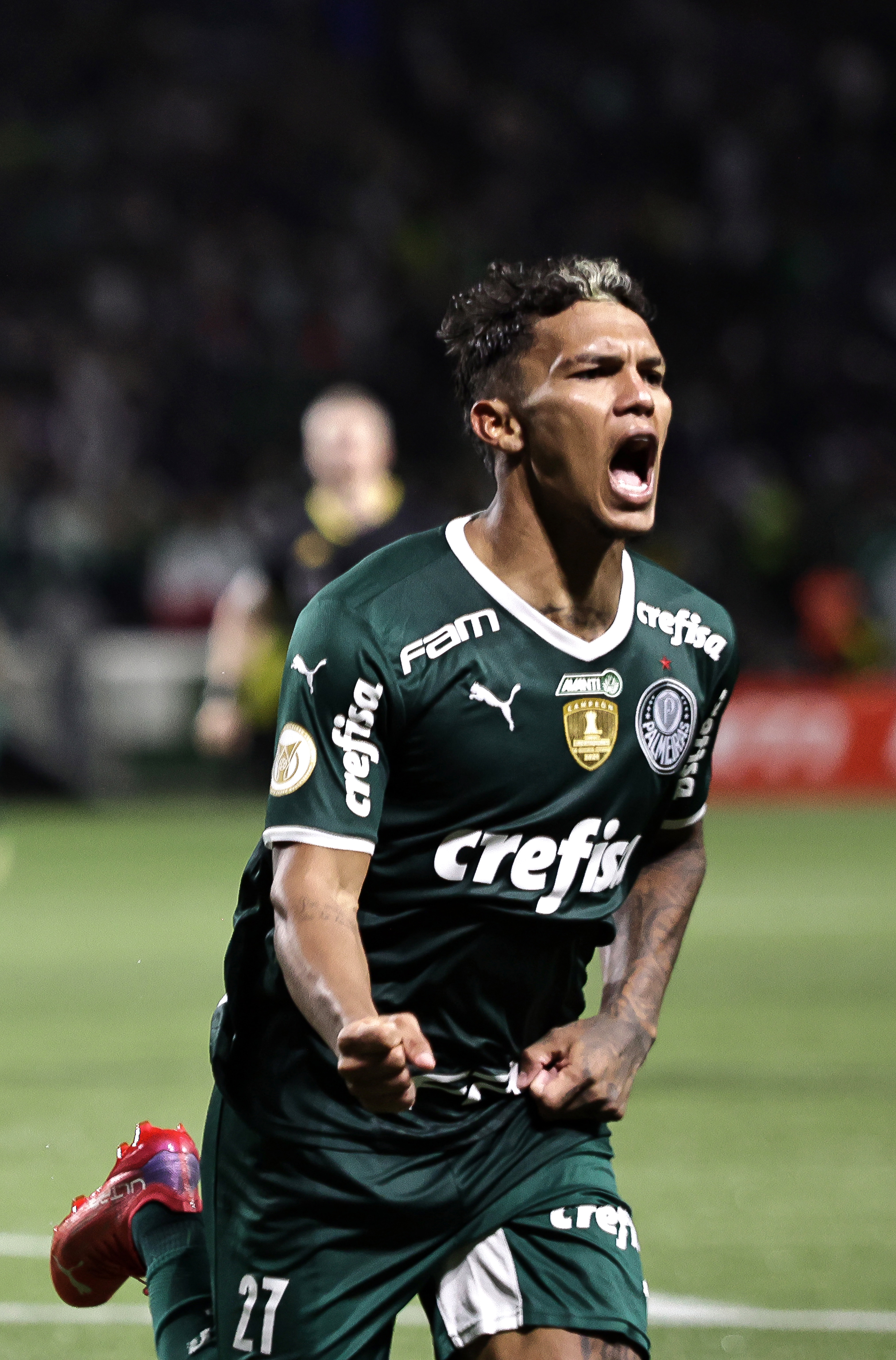
Veron celebrating a goal with Palmeiras in 2022

Veron joined Palmeiras' youth setup in 2017, from local side Santa Cruz de Natal. In June of the following year, he was the top goalscorer and the best player of the Mundial de Clubes de La Comunidad de Madrid Sub-17, helping the under-17 squad lift their first international trophy.

On 14 November 2018, Veron signed his first professional deal with Verdão, until 2021. Roughly one year later, after returning from international duty, he agreed to a pre-contract until 2024, active on his 18th birthday.

Veron made his first team – and Série A – debut on 28 November 2019, coming on as a second-half substitute for Willian in a 1–0 away loss against Fluminense. On 5 December, after coming on only in the second half, he scored twice and provided an assist to Dudu in a 5–1 home routing of Goiás; by doing so, he became the second-youngest player to score for the club.

In Palmeiras' run to winning the Copa do Brasil in 2020, Veron scored the only goal on 5 November in a last-16 home win over Red Bull Bragantino on Abel Ferreira's debut as head coach, and again six days later in a 3–0 quarter-final victory over Ceará. The team also won the Copa Libertadores, with him netting in 5–0 wins at Allianz Parque over Tigre (last group game) and Delfín (two goals, round of 16, second leg).

On 30 November 2021, with Palmeiras fielding youngsters immediately after winning the Libertadores for the third consecutive time, Veron scored to conclude a 3–1 win at Cuiabá and was sent off with a second yellow card for removing his shirt. After the team won the 2022 Campeonato Paulista against São Paulo, he had six titles at the age of 19.

In July 2022, Veron was fined 40% of his wages by Palmeiras after being caught drinking in a party. He was later criticized by Abel Ferreira, urging him to "not waste his talent".

=== Porto ===
On 22 July 2022, Veron signed for Porto of the Portuguese Primeira Liga for a fee of €10.25 million. He made his debut eight days later in the Supertaça Cândido de Oliveira, playing the final three minutes of a 3–0 win over Tondela at the Estádio Municipal de Aveiro.

==== Cruzeiro (loan) ====
On 27 December 2023, Porto sent Veron on loan to Série A side Cruzeiro until 31 December 2024, with a €10 million option-to-buy. Shortly after arriving, he suffered an injury in his right foot which caused him to miss the entire 2024 Campeonato Mineiro.

Back to action in April 2024, Veron became a starter until suffering a thigh injury in July, being sidelined for nearly two months. Despite finishing the year as a first-choice, the club opted to not exercise his buyout clause, and he left in December.

==== Santos (loan) ====
On 4 February 2025, Veron was announced at Santos on loan for the season, with a buyout clause. He made his club debut nineteen days later, replacing Zé Ivaldo at half-time in a 3–0 away win over Inter de Limeira.

In June 2025, after indiscipline problems, his loan was cut short.

==== Juventude (loan) ====
On 16 July 2025, Juventude announced the signing of Veron until December, also on loan from Porto.

==== Nacional (loan) ====
On 13 January 2026, after returning to Porto from his spell at Juventude, Veron was loaned again, this time to fellow Primeira Liga club Nacional until the end of the 2025–26 season.

== International career ==
Already a regular at Brazil under-17s, Veron was included in Guilherme Dalla Déa's 21-man list for the 2019 FIFA U-17 World Cup on 20 September 2019. An undisputed starter during the competition, he contributed with three goals as his side lifted the trophy for the fourth time, and was subsequently awarded the Golden Ball.

== Career statistics ==
=== Club ===
As of 14 May 2025

Appearances and goals by club, season and competition
| Club | Season | League | | | State league (Note: Includes Campeonato Paulista, Campeonato Mineiro) | | National cup (Note: Includes Copa do Brasil and Taça de Portugal) | | League cup (Note: Includes Taça da Liga) | | Continental | | Other | | Total | |
| Club | Season | Division | Apps | Goals | Apps | Goals | Apps | Goals | Apps | Goals | Apps | Goals | Apps | Goals | Apps | Goals |
|---|---|---|---|---|---|---|---|---|---|---|---|---|---|---|---|---|
| Palmeiras | 2019 | Série A | 3 | 2 | — | | 0 | 0 | — | | — | | — | | 3 | 2 |
| Palmeiras | 2020 | Série A | 20 | 4 | 6 | 0 | 4 | 2 | — | | 7 (Note: Appearances in Copa Libertadores) | 3 | — | | 37 | 9 |
| Palmeiras | 2021 | Série A | 14 | 1 | 0 | 0 | 0 | 0 | — | | 4 | 0 | 2 (Note: One appearance in Recopa Sudamericana, one appearance in Supercopa do Brasil) | 0 | 20 | 1 |
| Palmeiras | 2022 | Série A | 12 | 1 | 13 | 0 | 3 | 0 | — | | 5 | 1 | 2 (Note: Appearances in Recopa Sudamericana) | 0 | 35 | 2 |
| Palmeiras | Total | | 49 | 8 | 19 | 0 | 7 | 2 | — | | 16 | 4 | 4 | 0 | 95 | 14 |
| Porto | 2022–23 | Primeira Liga | 17 | 0 | — | | 3 | 1 | 2 | 0 | 3 (Note: Appearances in UEFA Champions League) | 0 | 1 (Note: Appearance in Supertaça Cândido de Oliveira) | 0 | 26 | 1 |
| Porto | 2023–24 | Primeira Liga | 0 | 0 | — | | 0 | 0 | 0 | 0 | 0 | 0 | 0 | 0 | 0 | 0 |
| Porto | 2024–25 | Primeira Liga | 0 | 0 | — | | 0 | 0 | 0 | 0 | 0 | 0 | 0 | 0 | 0 | 0 |
| Porto | Total | | 17 | 0 | — | | 3 | 1 | 2 | 0 | 3 | 0 | 1 | 0 | 26 | 1 |
| Porto B | 2022–23 | Liga Portugal 2 | 1 | 0 | — | | — | | — | | — | | — | | 1 | 0 |
| Porto B | 2023–24 | Liga Portugal 2 | 1 | 0 | — | | — | | — | | — | | — | | 1 | 0 |
| Porto B | Total | | 2 | 0 | — | | — | | — | | — | | — | | 2 | 0 |
| Cruzeiro (loan) | 2024 | Série A | 27 | 6 | 0 | 0 | 0 | 0 | — | | 10 (Note: Appearances in Copa Sudamericana) | 0 | — | | 37 | 6 |
| Santos (loan) | 2025 | Série A | 6 | 0 | 2 | 0 | 1 | 0 | — | | — | | — | | 9 | 0 |
| Career total | | | 101 | 14 | 21 | 0 | 11 | 3 | 2 | 0 | 29 | 4 | 5 | 0 | 169 | 21 |

== Honours ==
Palmeiras

- Campeonato Paulista: 2020, 2022
- Copa do Brasil: 2020
- Copa Libertadores: 2020, 2021
- Recopa Sudamericana: 2022
- Campeonato Brasileiro: 2022

Porto

- Taça de Portugal: 2022–23
- Taça da Liga: 2022–23
- Supertaça Cândido de Oliveira: 2022

Brazil U17

- FIFA U-17 World Cup: 2019

Individual

- FIFA U-17 World Cup Golden Ball: 2019
