= Philip Tear =

Swedish footballer

Personal information
- Full name: Jaan Philip Tear
- Date of birth: 16 August 1998 (age 28)
- Place of birth: Sweden
- Height: 1.87 m (6 ft 2 in)
- Position: Goalkeeper

Team information
- Current team: Portimonense B
- Number: 99

Youth career
- FC Djursholm

Senior career*
Years	Team	Apps	(Gls)
2015–2016	FC Djursholm	19	(0)
2016–2017	Rayo Cantabria	21	(0)
2017–2018	Tenerife B	4	(0)
2018–2019	Las Zocas	11	(0)
2019–2020	Portugalete	30	(0)
2020–2021	Somorrostro	16	(0)
2021–2023	Tondela	2	(0)
2024–2025	Portimonense	1	(0)
2025–	Portimonense B	7	(0)
- * Club domestic league appearances and goals as of 9 November 2025

Jaan Philip Tear (born 16 August 1998) is a Swedish professional footballer who plays as a goalkeeper for Portuguese Campeonato de Portugal side Portimonense B.

== Career ==
Tear started his career with Swedish sixth tier side FC Djursholm. In 2016, he signed for Rayo Cantabria in the Spanish fourth tier.

In 2021, Tear signed a two-year deal with Primeira Liga club Tondela. In June 2023, Tondela announced Tear's departure from the club, after his contract expired.
