= Evanilson (footballer, born 1999) =

Brazilian footballer (born 1999)

- Evanilson in 2024

Personal information
- Full name: Francisco Evanilson de Lima Barbosa
- Date of birth: 6 October 1999 (age 27)
- Place of birth: Fortaleza, Brazil
- Height: 1.83 m (6 ft 0 in)
- Position: Striker

Team information
- Current team: Bournemouth
- Number: 9

Youth career
- Estação
- 2013–2018: Fluminense

Senior career*
Years	Team	Apps	(Gls)
2018–2019	Fluminense	4	(2)
2018	→ Šamorín (loan)	6	(3)
2020	Tombense	0	(0)
2020	→ Fluminense (loan)	16	(7)
2020–2024	Porto	96	(37)
2021	Porto B	5	(6)
2024–	Bournemouth	78	(22)

International career^{‡}
2020	Brazil U23	2	(0)
2024–	Brazil	2	(0)
- * Club domestic league appearances and goals as of 21:16, 21 November 2026 (UTC) ‡ National team caps and goals as of 03:52, 7 July 2024 (UTC)

Francisco Evanilson de Lima Barbosa (born 6 October 1999), commonly known as Evanilson, is a Brazilian professional footballer who plays as a striker for Premier League club Bournemouth and the Brazil national team.

Evanilson is a product of Fluminense's youth system and made his senior debut for the club in January 2018. He spent time on loan at Slovak club Šamorín in the 2017–18 season. In 2020, he joined Tombense but was immediately loaned back to Fluminense. Later that year, he moved to Porto. With the club, he won one Primeira Liga, two Taças de Portugal one Taça da Liga, with the former's being part of a domestic double of the Primeira Liga and the Taça de Portugal in the 2021–22 season. In 2024, Evanilson moved to England with Bournemouth, arriving for a club-record fee.

Evanilson represented Brazil at under-23 level, before making his senior debut in 2024.

== Club career ==
=== Fluminense ===
Born in Fortaleza, Evanilson joined Fluminense's youth setup in 2013, from local side Estação. He made his first team debut on 17 January 2018, coming on as a second-half substitute for Dudu in a 3–1 Campeonato Carioca away loss against Boavista; he also gave away a penalty in that match.

On 23 January 2018, Evanilson was sent to a six-month loan to Fluminense's farm team affiliate Šamorín in Slovakia's 2. Liga. He made his debut abroad on 14 April, replacing Roman Sabler in a 1–0 home win against Partizán Bardejov. Fourteen days later, Evanilson scored his first senior goal, netting the opener in a 2–0 away win over Spišská Nová Ves, before returning to Fluminense in May after contributing with three goals in six appearances.

Upon returning to Fluminense, Evanilson was assigned back at the under-20 squad. In September 2019, after being the top goalscorer of the Campeonato Brasileiro Sub-20 with 11 goals, he was promoted to the main squad. After standing out in Flu's youth sides, he quickly rose to the first team, but fell out of favour within the club, after not being sought as one of the biggest recent promises from Flu youth sides.

Evanilson made his Série A debut on 7 November 2019, replacing fellow youth graduate Marcos Paulo in a 2–0 away win against São Paulo. On 8 December, in his first start for the club, he scored a brace in a 2–1 away defeat of Corinthians.

On 13 December 2019, Evanilson signed a pre-contract with Tombense, effective as of February. The following 15 January, Fluminense announced he would remain at the club on loan until December 2021. Evanilson became a regular starter for Flu in the 2020 campaign, partnering with Marcos Paulo up front.

=== Porto ===
On 7 September 2020, Evanilson signed a five-year contract with Portuguese club Porto in a transfer worth €8.8 million, with Fluminense receiving 30% of the fee paid to Tombense via a 10% stake in the player's rights and a 20% showcase fee that triggered if the player was sold before the end of 2021. Fluminense also retained a 6% profit of a future sale. He made his debut for the club on 24 October, scoring the winning goal in a 1–0 home win against Gil Vicente in the Primeira Liga. The following months, after finding limited first team opportunities, Evanilson dropped into Porto's reserve team in LigaPro, to earn a place in the first team under manager Sérgio Conceição, following advice from team-mate Otávio.

After scoring six goals in five matches for Porto's B team, Evanilson began earning a spot in the first team on 30 October 2021, scoring a brace in a 4–1 home win against local rivals Boavista in the Derby da Invicta. On 23 December, Evanilson scored a brace in a 3–0 win over rivals Benfica in the Taça de Portugal, before being sent off in the process, which forced him to miss the following match against the same opposition in the Primeira Liga.

On 16 January 2022, he scored his first hat-trick in the league in a 4–1 away win over B SAD, doubling his last season's record of ten goals. On 30 January, he scored a backheel goal in a 2–1 home win against Marítimo, earning him the Primeira Liga Goal of the Month award. His performances led to him being also named the league's Forward of the Month for January. On 6 March, Evanilson scored a goal and provided an assist to help his team come from behind in the first leg of Porto's semifinal match in the Taça de Portugal in a 2–1 away win against rivals Sporting CP to become the first Porto player since the 1997–98 season after Mário Jardel to score six or more goals for the club in the competition.

He would contribute to 46 appearances, scoring 21 goals, to help Porto win the domestic double of the Primeira Liga and the Taça de Portugal, while also finishing as the top scorer of the latter competition with 7 goals. On 30 July, Evanilson scored and provided an assist in the 3–0 defeat of Tondela in the Supertaça Cândido de Oliveira. On 26 October, he scored his first Champions League goal in a 4–0 away win over Club Brugge.

On 25 October 2023, Evanilson scored his second career hat-trick in a 4–1 away victory over Royal Antwerp in the group stage of the UEFA Champions League. On 9 January 2024, he scored another hat-trick, in a 4–0 away victory over Estoril in the round of 16 of the Taça de Portugal.

=== Bournemouth ===
On 16 August 2024, Evanilson joined Premier League club Bournemouth, arriving for a club-record fee, reported to be £40.2 million.

He scored his first goal for the club in a 3–1 win over Southampton on 30 September. On 2 November, Evanilson scored Bournemouth's second goal in a 2–1 win against reigning Premier League champions Manchester City. It was the club's first ever win against City in any competition and the result ended City's 32-game unbeaten run in the league. In January 2025, he suffered a broken bone in his foot, which would sideline him for an extended period.

On 27 April 2025, in the match against Manchester United Evanlison was shown a straight red card for the dangerous tackle he made on Noussair Mazraoui. The game ended 1–1 and therefore, would miss the next three games against Arsenal, Aston Villa and Manchester City. However, on 29 April, the red card was overturned via an appeal.

== International career ==
Evanilson has made two appearances for Brazil at under-23 level, in friendlies against South Korea and Egypt in November 2020.

In May 2024, Evanilson received his first call up to the Brazil senior team, being included in the squad for the 2024 Copa América. He made his debut on 8 June 2024 in a friendly against Mexico at Kyle Field in Texas, United States. He started the game and played 61 minutes in a 3–2 victory.

== Career statistics ==
=== Club ===
As of match played 21 November 2026

Appearances and goals by club, season and competition
Club	Season	League			State league (Note: Includes Campeonato Carioca)		National cup (Note: Includes Copa do Brasil, Taça de Portugal, FA Cup)		League cup (Note: Includes Taça da Liga, EFL Cup)		Continental		Other		Total	
Club	Season	Division	Apps	Goals	Apps	Goals	Apps	Goals	Apps	Goals	Apps	Goals	Apps	Goals	Apps	Goals
Fluminense	2018	Série A	0	0	1	0	0	0	—		0	0	—		1	0
Fluminense	2019	Série A	3	2	0	0	0	0	—		0	0	—		3	2
Fluminense	Total		3	2	1	0	0	0	—		0	0	—		4	2
Šamorín (loan)	2017–18	2. Liga	6	3	—		—		—		—		—		6	3
Tombense	2020	Série C	0	0	0	0	—		—		—		—		0	0
Fluminense (loan)	2020	Série A	6	2	10	5	4	0	—		2 (Note: Appearances in Copa Sudamericana)	1	—		22	8
Porto B	2020–21	Segunda Liga	5	6	—		—		—		—		—		5	6
Porto	2020–21	Primeira Liga	15	3	—		4	1	0	0	5 (Note: Appearances in UEFA Champions League)	0	0	0	24	4
Porto	2021–22	Primeira Liga	30	14	—		7	7	1	0	8 (Note: Four appearances in UEFA Champions League, four appearances in UEFA Europa League)	0	—		46	21
Porto	2022–23	Primeira Liga	23	7	—		6	1	3	0	8	1	1 (Note: Appearance in Supertaça Cândido de Oliveira)	1	41	10
Porto	2023–24	Primeira Liga	27	13	—		6	8	2	0	7	4	0	0	42	25
Porto	2024–25	Primeira Liga	1	0	—		—		—		—		0	0	1	0
Porto	Total		96	37	—		23	17	6	0	28	5	1	1	154	60
Bournemouth	2024–25	Premier League	31	10	—		2	2	1	0	—		—		34	12
Bournemouth	2025–26	Premier League	36	6	—		1	0	1	0	—		—		38	6
Bournemouth	2026–27	Premier League	11	6	—		0	0	0	0	4 (Note: Appearances in UEFA Europa League)	2	—		15	8
Bournemouth	Total		78	22	—		3	2	2	0	4	2	—		87	26
Career total			194	72	11	5	30	19	8	0	34	8	1	1	278	105

=== International ===
As of match played 6 July 2024

Appearances and goals by national team and year
National team	Year	Apps	Goals
Brazil	2024	2	0
Total		2	0

== Honours ==
Porto

- Primeira Liga: 2021–22
- Taça de Portugal: 2021–22, 2022–23, 2023–24
- Taça da Liga: 2022–23
- Supertaça Cândido de Oliveira: 2022

Individual

- Primeira Liga's Forward of the Month: January 2022
- Primeira Liga's Goal of the Month: January 2022
- Taça de Portugal Top scorer: 2021–22 (7 goals), 2023–24 (8 goals)
