= Bernardo Folha =

Portuguese footballer

Personal information
- Full name: Bernardo Pereira Folha
- Date of birth: 23 March 2002 (age 24)
- Place of birth: Porto, Portugal
- Height: 1.77 m (5 ft 10 in)
- Position: Midfielder

Team information
- Current team: Aris Limassol
- Number: 23

Youth career
- 2009–2010: Boavista
- 2010–2021: Porto
- 2017–2018: → Padroense (loan)

Senior career*
Years	Team	Apps	(Gls)
2021–2024	Porto B	80	(6)
2021–2023	Porto	5	(0)
2024–2026	Al Wahda	17	(0)
2026–	Aris Limassol	4	(0)

International career
2019	Portugal U18	4	(0)
2021	Portugal U20	4	(0)
2022–2024	Portugal U21	3	(0)
- * Club domestic league appearances and goals as of 15:49, 6 November 2026 (UTC)

Bernardo Pereira Folha (born 23 March 2002) is a Portuguese professional footballer who plays as a midfielder for Cypriot First Division club Aris Limassol.

== Club career ==
=== Porto ===
Born in Porto, Folha joined FC Porto's youth system at age 8. On 18 December 2020, he renewed his contract with the club until 2024.

Folha made his Liga Portugal 2 debut with the reserves on 14 February 2021, coming on as a second-half substitute in a 1–2 home loss against Oliveirense and being sent off with a straight red card after only nine minutes on the pitch. He scored his first goal in the competition one month later, opening the 1–1 away draw with Chaves following an individual effort.

Folha's first competitive appearance for the main squad took place on 15 December 2021, when he replaced Sérgio Oliveira late into the 1–0 win over Rio Ave in the group stage of the Taça da Liga. In the following edition of the tournament, he contributed four appearances for the winners while scoring in the semi-finals on 25 January 2023 to help defeat Académico de Viseu 3–0. On 1 February, his Primeira Liga bow, he was again ejected, after two bookings in the first half of an eventual 2–0 victory at Marítimo who also finished with ten players.

=== Al Wahda ===
On 31 July 2024, his contract having expired at Porto, Folha signed for Al Wahda in the UAE Pro League. He scored once from 29 games, in a 4–2 away defeat of Ajman Club in the League Cup on 6 September 2025 immediately after taking the field.

=== Aris Limassol ===
On 1 October 2026, Folha signed a one-year deal with Aris Limassol, with the possibility of a three-year extension.

== International career ==
Folha won his first cap for Portugal at under-21 level on 29 March 2022, coming on for Fábio Carvalho in the 4–0 win in Greece for the 2023 UEFA European Championship qualifiers.

== Personal life ==
Folha's father, António, was also a footballer. A winger, he was also developed at Porto, and coached his son at the reserve team.

== Career statistics ==
As of match played 17 May 2024

Appearances and goals by club, season and competition
Club	Season	League			National cup		League cup		Continental		Total	
Club	Season	Division	Apps	Goals	Apps	Goals	Apps	Goals	Apps	Goals	Apps	Goals
Porto B	2020–21	Liga Portugal 2	13	1	—		—		—		13	1
Porto B	2021–22	Liga Portugal 2	29	2	—		—		—		29	2
Porto B	2022–23	Liga Portugal 2	16	2	—		—		—		16	2
Porto B	2023–24	Liga Portugal 2	22	1	—		—		—		22	1
Porto B	Total		80	6	—		—		—		80	6
Porto	2021–22	Primeira Liga	0	0	0	0	1	0	0	0	1	0
Porto	2022–23	Primeira Liga	5	0	2	0	4	1	2 (Note: Appearances in UEFA Champions League)	0	13	1
Porto	2023–24	Primeira Liga	0	0	0	0	0	0	0	0	0	0
Porto	Total		5	0	2	0	5	1	2	0	14	1
Career total			85	6	2	0	5	1	2	0	94	7

== Honours ==
Porto

- Taça de Portugal: 2022–23
- Taça da Liga: 2022–23
