= Cláudio Ramos (footballer) =

Portuguese footballer (born 1991)

Personal information
- Full name: Cláudio Pires Morais Ramos
- Date of birth: 16 November 1991 (age 35)
- Place of birth: Vila Nova de Paiva, Portugal
- Height: 1.83 m (6 ft 0 in)
- Position: Goalkeeper

Team information
- Current team: Porto
- Number: 14

Youth career
- 2002–2005: Paivense
- 2005–2006: Académico Viseu
- 2006: Repesenses
- 2007–2010: Vitória Guimarães

Senior career*
| Years | Team | Apps | (Gls) |
| 2010–2012 | Vitória Guimarães | 0 | (0) |
| 2010–2011 | → Amarante (loan) | 16 | (0) |
| 2011–2012 | → Tondela (loan) | 7 | (0) |
| 2012–2020 | Tondela | 240 | (0) |
| 2020–2021 | Porto B | 4 | (0) |
| 2020– | Porto | 8 | (0) |

International career
| 2007 | Portugal U16 | 1 | (0) |
| 2008 | Portugal U17 | 1 | (0) |
| 2008–2009 | Portugal U18 | 3 | (0) |
| 2010 | Portugal U20 | 2 | (0) |
| 2018 | Portugal | 1 | (0) |
- * Club domestic league appearances and goals as of 18:58, 10 May 2026 (UTC)

Cláudio Pires Morais Ramos (born 16 November 1991) is a Portuguese professional footballer who plays as a goalkeeper for Primeira Liga club Porto.

He spent most of his career with Tondela, making 267 total appearances over nine seasons. In 2020, he signed with Porto.

Ramos won one cap for Portugal.

== Club career ==
=== Tondela ===
Born in Vila Nova de Paiva, Viseu District, Ramos represented Académico de Viseu F.C. in his hometown as a youth before moving to Vitória S.C. in 2007. He never played a senior game for the team from Guimarães and was loaned to Amarante F.C. and C.D. Tondela, who he joined permanently after winning promotion from the third division in the 2011–12 season.

Tondela reached the Primeira Liga for the first time in 2014–15, and Ramos made his debut in the competition on 30 October 2015 in a 0–4 home loss against S.L. Benfica after Matt Jones suffered an injury at the 30-minute mark. He was voted by club fans as Player of the Year for the 2015–16 campaign.

Ramos played all 34 matches in 2017–18, and the last one was his 200th for Tondela, making him the second-most used player in their history. He also led the league in saves (126) and penalty saves (three) that year.

From 9 April 2017 to 9 February 2020, Ramos started 94 consecutive league games, surpassing the previous record held by fellow goalkeeper Rui Patrício. He extended that mark to 103 on 1 July.

Ramos left Tondela at the end of the 2019–20 season, when his contract expired.

=== Porto ===
On 13 August 2020, Ramos signed a four-year deal with defending champions FC Porto. His first involvement for the club was on 21 December as the reserves drew 1–1 at G.D. Estoril Praia.

Ramos earned a league medal for the first team in the 2021–22 campaign, starting in a 2–0 home win over Estoril in the last matchday. He took the field in the 2025 FIFA Club World Cup group opener against SE Palmeiras due to the absence of Diogo Costa, and produced a number of saves in a 0–0 draw; after the match, newspaper A Bola and opposition manager Abel Ferreira praised his performance.

== International career ==
Ramos made his senior debut for Portugal on 14 October 2018 in a 3–1 friendly win over Scotland at Hampden Park, playing the last four minutes as a substitute for Beto.

== Career statistics ==
As of match played 10 May 2026

Appearances and goals by club, season and competition
| Club | Season | League | | | National cup | | League cup | | Other | | Total | |
| Club | Season | Division | Apps | Goals | Apps | Goals | Apps | Goals | Apps | Goals | Apps | Goals |
|---|---|---|---|---|---|---|---|---|---|---|---|---|
| Tondela | 2011–12 | Segunda Divisão | 7 | 0 | 3 | 0 | — | | — | | 10 | 0 |
| Tondela | 2012–13 | Liga Portugal 2 | 29 | 0 | 1 | 0 | 2 | 0 | — | | 32 | 0 |
| Tondela | 2013–14 | Liga Portugal 2 | 25 | 0 | 1 | 0 | 0 | 0 | — | | 26 | 0 |
| Tondela | 2014–15 | Liga Portugal 2 | 36 | 0 | 2 | 0 | 2 | 0 | — | | 40 | 0 |
| Tondela | 2015–16 | Primeira Liga | 20 | 0 | 0 | 0 | 1 | 0 | — | | 21 | 0 |
| Tondela | 2016–17 | Primeira Liga | 33 | 0 | 3 | 0 | 0 | 0 | — | | 36 | 0 |
| Tondela | 2017–18 | Primeira Liga | 34 | 0 | 0 | 0 | 1 | 0 | — | | 35 | 0 |
| Tondela | 2018–19 | Primeira Liga | 34 | 0 | 2 | 0 | 1 | 0 | — | | 37 | 0 |
| Tondela | 2019–20 | Primeira Liga | 29 | 0 | 0 | 0 | 1 | 0 | — | | 30 | 0 |
| Tondela | Total | | 247 | 0 | 12 | 0 | 8 | 0 | — | | 267 | 0 |
| Porto B | 2020–21 | Liga Portugal 2 | 4 | 0 | 0 | 0 | 0 | 0 | — | | 4 | 0 |
| Porto | 2021–22 | Primeira Liga | 1 | 0 | 0 | 0 | 1 | 0 | 0 | 0 | 2 | 0 |
| Porto | 2022–23 | Primeira Liga | 1 | 0 | 7 | 0 | 6 | 0 | 0 | 0 | 14 | 0 |
| Porto | 2023–24 | Primeira Liga | 2 | 0 | 4 | 0 | 2 | 0 | 0 | 0 | 8 | 0 |
| Porto | 2024–25 | Primeira Liga | 2 | 0 | 2 | 0 | 2 | 0 | 3 (Note: Appearances in FIFA Club World Cup) | 0 | 9 | 0 |
| Porto | 2025–26 | Primeira Liga | 2 | 0 | 2 | 0 | 1 | 0 | 0 | 0 | 5 | 0 |
| Porto | Total | | 8 | 0 | 15 | 0 | 12 | 0 | 3 | 0 | 38 | 0 |
| Career total | | | 259 | 0 | 27 | 0 | 20 | 0 | 3 | 0 | 309 | 0 |

== Honours ==
Tondela

- Segunda Liga: 2014–15

Porto

- Primeira Liga: 2021–22, 2025–26
- Taça de Portugal: 2021–22, 2022–23, 2023–24
- Taça da Liga: 2022–23
- Supertaça Cândido de Oliveira: 2022, 2024
