= Guilherme Ferreira (footballer, born 1991) =

Portuguese footballer

Personal information
- Full name: Guilherme Filipe Salgado Ferreira
- Date of birth: 17 April 1991 (age 35)
- Place of birth: Alverca do Ribatejo, Portugal
- Height: 1.69 m (5 ft 7 in)
- Position: Left-back

Youth career
- 2006–2010: Alverca

Senior career*
Years	Team	Apps	(Gls)
2010–2012	Vilafranquense		
2012	Real		
2013	Vitória de Sernache	14	(3)
2013–2014	Fátima	13	(0)
2014	Benfica e Castelo Branco	16	(0)
2014–2015	Santa Clara	5	(0)
2015–2016	Olhanense	19	(0)
2016–2025	Mafra	204	(21)
- * Club domestic league appearances and goals as of 5 June 2025

Guilherme Filipe Salgado Ferreira (born 17 April 1991) is a Portuguese professional footballer who plays as a left-back.

== Career ==
On 12 October 2014, Ferreira made his professional debut with Santa Clara in a 2014–15 Segunda Liga match against Portimonense.
