= 2020–21 FC Porto season =

FC Porto
2020–21 season
- President: Jorge Nuno Pinto da Costa
- Head coach: Sérgio Conceição
- Stadium: Estádio do Dragão
- Primeira Liga: 2nd
- Taça de Portugal: Semi-finals
- Taça da Liga: Semi-finals
- Supertaça Cândido de Oliveira: Winners
- UEFA Champions League: Quarter-finals
- Top goalscorer: League: Mehdi Taremi (18 goals); All: Mehdi Taremi (25 goals)
- Biggest win: Boavista 0–5 Porto (26 September 2020)
- Biggest defeat: Manchester City 3–1 Porto (21 October 2020); Porto 0–2 Chelsea (7 April 2021)
Home colours	Away colours	Third colours

The 2020–21 season was Futebol Clube do Porto's 111th competitive season and 87th consecutive season in the top flight of Portuguese football. In addition to the domestic league, Porto participated in this season's editions of the Taça de Portugal, the Taça da Liga and the UEFA Champions League. The season started on 19 September 2020 and concluded on 19 May 2021.

On 23 December 2020, Porto defeated Benfica 2–0 to win the 42nd edition of the Supertaça Cândido de Oliveira, securing their first title of the season and a record-extending 22nd win in the competition.

== Players ==
=== Squad information ===
N	Pos.	Nat.	Name	Age	EU	Since	App	Goals	Ends	Transfer fee	Notes
1	GK	(Argentina)	Agustín Marchesín	32	Non-EU	2019	85	0	2023	€7.5M	
3	DF	(Portugal)	Pepe (captain)	37	EU	2019	187	13	2023	Free	Second spell at the club after 2004-2007
4	DF	(Portugal)	Diogo Leite	21	EU	2018	51	3	2023	Youth system	
5	DF	(Spain)	Iván Marcano	33	EU	2019	195	20	2023	€3M	Second spell at the club after 2014-2018
6	MF	(Senegal)	Mamadou Loum	23	Non-EU	2019	23	1	2022	€7.5M	
7	FW	(Colombia)	Luis Díaz	23	Non-EU	2019	97	25	2024	€7M	
8	MF	(Colombia)	Mateus Uribe	29	Non-EU	2019	87	6	2023	€9M	
9	FW	(Iran)	Mehdi Taremi	28	Non-EU	2020	48	23	2024	Undisclosed	
10	FW	(Japan)	Shoya Nakajima	26	Non-EU	2019	37	1	2024	€12M	Loaned to Al Ain
11	FW	(Mali)	Moussa Marega	29	Non-EU	2016	190	72	2021	€3.8M	
12	DF	(Nigeria)	Zaidu Sanusi	23	Non-EU	2020	41	2	2025	Undisclosed	
14	GK	(Portugal)	Cláudio Ramos	28	EU	2020	0	0	2024	Free	
15	MF	(Portugal)	Carraça	27	EU	2020	3	0	2024	Free	
16	MF	(Serbia)	Marko Grujić	24	Non-EU	2020	39	2	2021	Undisclosed	Loaned from Liverpool
17	FW	(Mexico)	Jesús Corona	27	Non-EU	2015	269	31	2022	€10.5M	
18	DF	(Portugal)	Wilson Manafá	26	EU	2019	110	2	2023	Undisclosed	
19	DF	(Democratic Republic of the Congo)	Chancel Mbemba	26	Non-EU	2018	91	7	2022	€4.5M	
21	MF	(Portugal)	Romário Baró	20	EU	2019	34	0	2023	Youth system	
23	MF	(Portugal)	João Mário	20	EU	2020	23	2	2025	Youth system	
25	MF	(Brazil)	Otávio	25	Non-EU	2014	190	19	2021	€2.5M	
27	MF	(Portugal)	Sérgio Oliveira (vice-captain)	28	EU	2015	146	34	2025	€1M	
28	FW	(Brazil)	Felipe Anderson	27	Non-EU	2020	10	0	2021	Undisclosed	Loaned from West Ham United
29	FW	(Spain)	Toni Martínez	23	EU	2020	27	8	2025	Undisclosed	
30	FW	(Brazil)	Evanilson	20	Non-EU	2020	24	4	2025	Undisclosed	
31	DF	(Guinea-Bissau)	Nanu	21	EU	2020	19	0	2025	Undisclosed	Second nationality: Portugal
32	DF	(France)	Malang Sarr	21	EU	2020	19	1	2021	Undisclosed	Loaned from Chelsea
50	MF	(Portugal)	Fábio Vieira	20	EU	2020	37	3	2022	Youth system	
99	GK	(Portugal)	Diogo Costa	21	EU	2018	25	0	2022	Youth system	

- Last updated: 7 February 2020
- Source: FC Porto
- Ordered by squad number.

=== Transfers ===
==== In ====
Date	Pos.	Name	Nationality	Age	Transferred from	Window	Until	Fee	Ref.
12 August 2020	MF	Carraça	Portugal	27	Boavista (Portugal)	Summer	2024	Free	
13 August 2020	GK	Cláudio Ramos	Portugal	28	Tondela (Portugal)	Summer	2024	Free	
30 August 2020	DF	Zaidu Sanusi	Nigeria	23	Santa Clara (Portugal)	Summer	2025	Undisclosed	
30 August 2020	FW	Mehdi Taremi	Iran	28	Rio Ave (Portugal)	Summer	2024	Undisclosed	
9 September 2020	FW	Evanilson	Brazil	20	Fluminense (Brazil)	Summer	2025	Undisclosed	
4 October 2020	FW	Toni Martínez	Spain	23	Famalicão (Portugal)	Summer	2025	€3.5M	

==== Out ====
Date	Pos.	Name	Nationality	Age	Transferred to	Window	Fee	Ref.
1 August 2020	DF	Jorge Fernandes	Portugal	23	Vitória Guimarães (Portugal)	Summer	€0.25M	
31 August 2020	FW	André Pereira	Portugal	25	Rio Ave (Portugal)	Summer	Undisclosed	
5 September 2020	FW	Fábio Silva	Portugal	18	Wolverhampton Wanderers (England)	Summer	€40M	
24 September 2020	FW	Francisco Soares	Brazil	29	Tianjin Teda (China)	Summer	Undisclosed	
26 September 2020	FW	Vincent Aboubakar	Cameroon	28	Beşiktaş (Turkey)	Summer	Free (terminated contract)	
2 October 2020	GK	Vaná	Brazil	29	Famalicão (Portugal)	Summer	Undisclosed	
5 October 2020	DF	Alex Telles	Brazil	27	Manchester United (England)	Summer	€15M	
5 October 2020	DF	Yordan Osorio	Venezuela	26	Parma (Italy)	Summer	Undisclosed	
6 October 2020	FW	Zé Luís	Cape Verde	26	Lokomotiv Moscow (Russia)	Summer	Undisclosed	
6 October 2020	DF	Diogo Queirós	Portugal	21	Famalicão (Portugal)	Summer	Undisclosed	

==== Loan in ====
Date	Pos.	Name	Nationality	Age	Loaned from	Window	Until	Ref.
6 October 2020	DF	Malang Sarr	France	21	Chelsea (England)	Summer	30 June 2021	
6 October 2020	FW	Felipe Anderson	Brazil	27	West Ham United (England)	Summer	30 June 2021	
6 October 2020	MF	Marko Grujić	Serbia	24	Liverpool (England)	Summer	30 June 2021	

==== Loan return ====
Date	Pos.	Name	Nationality	Age	Returned from	Window
1 July 2020	DF	Diogo Queirós	Portugal	21	Mouscron (Belgium)	Summer

==== Loan out ====
Date	Pos.	Name	Nationality	Age	Loaned to	Window	Until	Ref.
5 September 2020	DF	Chidozie Awaziem	Nigeria	23	Boavista (Portugal)	Summer	30 June 2021	
28 February 2020	DF	Renzo Saravia	Argentina	26	Internacional (Brazil)	Winter	31 December 2020	
9 September 2020	MF	Vítor Ferreira	Portugal	20	Wolverhampton Wanderers (England)	Summer	30 June 2021	
2 October 2020	MF	Fernando Andrade	Brazil	27	Çaykur Rizespor (Turkey)	Summer	30 June 2021	
5 October 2020	MF	Danilo Pereira	Portugal	29	Paris Saint-Germain (France)	Summer	30 June 2021	
5 October 2020	DF	Tomás Esteves	Portugal	18	Reading (England)	Summer	30 June 2021	

== Technical staff ==
Position	Staff
Head coach	(Portugal) Sérgio Conceição
Assistant coaches	(Portugal) Vítor Bruno
Assistant coaches	(France) Siramana Dembélé
Goalkeeper coach	(Portugal) Diamantino Figueiredo
Exercise Physiologist	(Portugal) Eduardo Oliveira

Last updated: 9 September 2020
Source: FC Porto

== Pre-season and friendlies ==
The club's pre-season was shorter due to the late finish of the previous season (1 August 2020) caused by the COVID-19 pandemic. Porto played six matches at home against other Portuguese teams and, unlike previous seasons, there was no official presentation match.

Win Draw Loss

29 August 2020 Friendly	Porto	7–0	Rio Ave B	Olival, Portugal
	Díaz 13'; F. Silva 17', 42'; Uribe 46'; Otávio 56'; Aboubakar 75', 85'			Stadium: CTFD PortoGaia

2 September 2020 Friendly	Porto	5–1	Académica	Olival, Portugal
10:00 WEST (UTC+1)	Díaz 20'; Marega 24'; Corona 39'; Soares 67', 85'		Bouldini 64'	Stadium: CTFD PortoGaia

5 September 2020 Friendly	Porto	0–1	Oliveirense	Olival, Portugal
			Thalis 1'	Stadium: CTFD PortoGaia

9 September 2020 Friendly	Porto	4–3	Tondela	Olival, Portugal
	Uribe 7'; Taremi 63'; Oliveira 70'; Soares 79'		Agra 23', 25'; Barbosa 78'	Stadium: CTFD PortoGaia

11 September 2020 Friendly	Porto	2–0	Farense	Olival, Portugal
16:00 WEST (UTC+1)	Telles 48'; Marega 75'			Stadium: CTFD PortoGaia

12 September 2020 Friendly	Porto	2–0	Nacional	Olival, Portugal
16:00 WEST (UTC+1)	Oliveira 49'; Uribe 74'			Stadium: CTFD PortoGaia

== Competitions ==
=== Overview ===
Competition	First match	Last match	Starting round	Final position	Record							
Competition	First match	Last match	Starting round	Final position	Pld	W	D	L	GF	GA	GD	Win %
Primeira Liga	19 September 2020	19 May 2021	Matchday 1	2nd	34	24	8	2	74	29	+45	70.59
Taça de Portugal	21 November 2020	3 March 2021	Third round	Semi-finals	6	4	1	1	13	7	+6	66.67
Taça da Liga	16 December 2020	19 January 2021	Quarter-finals	Semi-finals	2	1	0	1	3	3	+0	50.00
Supertaça Cândido de Oliveira	23 December 2020		Final	Winners	1	1	0	0	2	0	+2	100.00
UEFA Champions League	21 October 2020	13 April 2021	Group stage	Quarter-finals	10	6	1	3	15	9	+6	60.00
Total					53	36	10	7	107	48	+59	67.92

Last updated: 19 May 2021
Source: Soccerway

=== Primeira Liga ===
==== League table ====
Pos	Team	Pld	W	D	L	GF	GA	GD	Pts	Qualification or relegation
1	Sporting CP (C)	34	26	7	1	65	20	+45	85	Qualification for the Champions League group stage
2	Porto	34	24	8	2	74	29	+45	80	Qualification for the Champions League group stage
3	Benfica	34	23	7	4	69	27	+42	76	Qualification for the Champions League third qualifying round
4	Braga	34	19	7	8	53	33	+20	64	Qualification for the Europa League group stage (Note: Braga qualified for the Europa League group stage by winning the 2020–21 Taça de Portugal. Since they would have qualified for the Europa Conference League third qualifying round by finishing fourth, the berth was awarded to the fifth-placed team (Paços de Ferreira), and the Europa Conference League second qualifying round berth reserved to the fifth-placed team was awarded to the sixth-placed team (Santa Clara).)
5	Paços de Ferreira	34	15	8	11	40	41	−1	53	Qualification for the Europa Conference League third qualifying round

Source: Liga Portugal
Rules for classification: 1) Points; 2) Head-to-head points; 3) Head-to-head goal difference; 4) Head-to-head away goals scored; 5) Goal difference; 6) Matches won; 7) Goals scored; 8) Play-off.
(C) Champions

==== Results summary ====
Overall								Home						Away					
Pld	W	D	L	GF	GA	GD	Pts	W	D	L	GF	GA	GD	W	D	L	GF	GA	GD
34	24	8	2	74	29	+45	80	13	3	1	40	15	+25	11	5	1	34	14	+20

Last updated: 19 May 2021.
Source: Liga Portugal

==== Results by round ====
Round	1	2	3	4	5	6	7	8	9	10	11	12	13	14	15	16	17	18	19	20	21	22	23	24	25	26	27	28	29	30	31	32	33	34
Ground	H	A	H	A	H	A	H	A	H	H	A	H	A	H	A	H	A	A	H	A	H	A	H	A	H	A	A	H	A	H	A	H	A	H
Result	W	W	L	D	W	L	W	W	W	W	W	W	W	D	W	W	D	D	D	W	D	W	W	W	W	W	W	W	D	W	D	W	W	W
Position	2	1	3	2	2	4	4	4	3	3	3	2	2	2	2	2	2	2	2	2	3	3	2	2	2	2	2	2	2	2	2	2	2	2

Updated to match(es) played on 19 May 2021. Source: Liga Portugal
A = Away; H = Home; W = Win; D = Draw; L = Loss

==== Matches ====
The league fixtures were announced on 28 August 2020.

19 September 2020 1	Porto	3–1	Braga	Porto
21:00 WEST (UTC+1)	Oliveira 45+1'; Telles 45+3' (pen.), 89' (pen.)	Report	Castro 21'	Stadium: Estádio do Dragão; Attendance: 0 (Note: The match was played behind closed doors due to the COVID-19 pandemic in Portugal.); Referee: João Pinheiro

26 September 2020 2	Boavista	0–5	Porto	Porto
21:00 WEST (UTC+1)			Corona 47'; Oliveira 59'; Marega 67', 71'; Díaz 90+2'	Stadium: Estádio do Bessa; Attendance: 0 Referee: Luís Godinho

3 October 2020 3	Porto	2–3	Marítimo	Porto
18:30 WEST (UTC+1)	Pepe 42'; Otávio 90+9'		Pinho 24', 52'; Nanu 90+4'	Stadium: Estádio do Dragão; Attendance: 0 Referee: Rui Costa

17 October 2020 4	Sporting CP	2–2	Porto	Lisbon
20:30 WEST (UTC+1)	Santos 9'; Gonçalves (yellow card) 11'; Neto (yellow card) 45+7'; Feddal (yellow card) 61'; Vietto (yellow card) 78', (goal) 87'; Coates (yellow card) 79'	Report	Corona (yellow card) 19', (goal) 45'; Sanusi (yellow card) 20'; Uribe 25'; Otávio (yellow card) 54'; Marchesín (yellow card) 86'	Stadium: Estádio José Alvalade; Attendance: 0 Referee: Luís Godinho

24 October 2020 5	Porto	1–0	Gil Vicente	Porto
21:30 WEST (UTC+1)	Evanilson 41'	Report		Stadium: Estádio do Dragão; Attendance: 0 Referee: Hélder Malheiro

30 October 2020 6	Paços de Ferreira	3–2	Porto	Paços de Ferreira
20:30 WET (UTC±0)	Jan 11'; Eustáquio 43'; Costa 59' (pen.)	Report	Oliveira 45+7' (pen.); Otávio 78'	Stadium: Estádio da Mata Real; Attendance: 0 Referee: Nuno Almeida

8 November 2020 7	Porto	3–1	Portimonense	Porto
17:30 WET (UTC±0)	Mbemba 45+2'; Taremi 46'; Oliveira 89'	Report	Beto 13'	Stadium: Estádio do Dragão; Attendance: 0 Referee: António Nobre

28 November 2020 8	Santa Clara	0–1	Porto	Ponta Delgada
17:00 WET (UTC±0)	Rashid (yellow card) 33'; Costinha (yellow card) 37'	Report	Grujić (yellow card) 35'; Díaz 45+1'	Stadium: Estádio de São Miguel; Attendance: 0 Referee: João Pinheiro

5 December 2020 9	Porto	4–3	Tondela	Porto
20:30 WET (UTC±0)	Sanusi 4'; Marega 36', 48'; Uribe (yellow card) 40' (yellow-red card) 90+3'; Taremi 56'; Evanilson (yellow card) 79'	Report	González 20', 74'; Barbosa 33'; Medioub (yellow card) 39'; Pedro Augusto (yellow card) 62'; Mendes (yellow card) 79'; Grau (yellow card) 82'; Martínez (yellow card) 90+1'	Stadium: Estádio do Dragão; Attendance: 0 Referee: Tiago Martins

20 December 2020 10	Porto	2–0	Nacional	Porto
20:00 WET (UTC±0)	Oliveira 21' (pen.); Marega 39'	Report	Pedrão (yellow card) 20'; Azouni (yellow card) 63'	Stadium: Estádio do Dragão; Attendance: 0 Referee: Manuel Oliveira

29 December 2020 11	Vitória de Guimarães	2–3	Porto	Guimarães
21:00 WET (UTC±0)	Rochinha 7'; Mensah (yellow card) 15'; Pepelu (yellow card) 26'; Estupiñán 63'	Report	Baró (yellow card) 11'; Taremi 42', 65'; Díaz 80'	Stadium: Estádio D. Afonso Henriques; Attendance: 0 Referee: Hélder Malheiro

3 January 2021 12	Porto	3–0	Moreirense	Porto
21:00 WET (UTC±0)	Oliveira 22' (pen.); Corona (yellow card) 30'; Martínez (yellow card) 82', (goal) 88'; Evanilson 90+1'	Report		Stadium: Estádio do Dragão; Attendance: 0 Referee: Manuel Mota

8 January 2021 13	Famalicão	1–4	Porto	Vila Nova de Famalicão
21:00 WET (UTC±0)	Queirós (yellow card) 15'; Robert 20' (pen.); Vaná (yellow card) 31'; Assunção (yellow card) 41'; Riccieli (yellow card) 55'; Morer (yellow card) 90+3'	Report	Mbemba (yellow card) 12'; Taremi 13', 58'; Oliveira 32' (pen.); João Mário 89'	Stadium: Estádio Municipal 22 de Junho; Attendance: 0 Referee: Rui Costa

15 January 2021 14	Porto	1–1	Benfica	Porto
21:00 WET (UTC±0)	Taremi 25', (red card) 73'; Pepe (yellow card) 51'; Corona (yellow card) 64'; Marega (yellow card) 73'; Marchesín (yellow card) 90+5'	Report	Grimaldo 17'; Pizzi (yellow card) 50'; Tavares (yellow card) 54'; Chiquinho (yellow card) 78'; Vertonghen (yellow card) 84'	Stadium: Estádio do Dragão; Attendance: 0 Referee: Luís Godinho

25 January 2021 15	Farense	0–1	Porto	Faro
20:15 WET (UTC±0)	Nunes (yellow card) 89'	Report	Taremi 15'; Otávio (yellow card) 88'	Stadium: Estádio de São Luís; Attendance: 0 Referee: Manuel Mota

1 February 2021 16	Porto	2–0	Rio Ave	Porto
19:00 WET (UTC±0)	Díaz 44'; Evanilson 74'; Uribe (yellow card) 78'	Report	Ronan (yellow card) 38'; Pinto (yellow card) 72'	Stadium: Estádio do Dragão; Attendance: 0 Referee: Nuno Almeida

4 February 2021 17	Belenenses SAD	0–0	Porto	Oeiras
19:00 WET (UTC±0)	Calila (yellow card) 4'; Sithole (yellow card) 14'; Silva (yellow card) 73'; Lima (yellow card) 90+18'	Report	Marega (yellow card) 87'	Stadium: Estádio Nacional; Attendance: 0 Referee: Fábio Veríssimo

7 February 2021 18	Braga	2–2	Porto	Braga
20:45 WET (UTC±0)	Galeno (yellow card) 20'; Tormena (yellow card) 34'; Carmo (yellow card) 59'; Fransérgio 87'; Gaitán 90+4'	Report	Corona (yellow card) 5' (yellow-red card) 60'; Uribe (yellow card) 18'; Oliveira 36' (pen.); Taremi 54'	Stadium: Estádio Municipal de Braga; Attendance: 0 Referee: Artur Soares Dias

13 February 2021 19	Porto	2–2	Boavista	Porto
20:30 WET (UTC±0)	João Mário (yellow card) 29'; Taremi 54'; Oliveira 82' (pen.), (penalty missed) 85'; Evanilson (yellow card) 90+4'	Report	Porozo 8'; Paulinho (yellow card) 18'; Elis 45+1'; Jardim (yellow card) 85'; Rami (yellow card) 90+7'; Pérez (yellow card) 90+7'	Stadium: Estádio do Dragão; Attendance: 0 Referee: Manuel Mota

22 February 2021 20	Marítimo	1–2	Porto	Funchal
19:00 WET (UTC±0)	Andrade 18'; Hermes (yellow card) 31'; Joel (yellow card) 69'; Pelágio (yellow card) 71'; Jean (yellow card) 86'; Abedzadeh (yellow card) 87'; Zainadine (yellow card) 90+3'	Report	Uribe 14'; Manafá (yellow card) 32'; Marchesín (yellow card) 83'; Otávio 90+3' (pen.)	Stadium: Estádio do Marítimo; Attendance: 0 Referee: Vitor Ferreira

27 February 2021 21	Porto	0–0	Sporting CP	Porto
20:30 WET (UTC±0)	Pepe (yellow card) 55'	Report	Mendes (yellow card) 27'; Feddal (yellow card) 55'	Stadium: Estádio do Dragão; Attendance: 0 Referee: João Pinheiro

6 March 2021 22	Gil Vicente	0–2	Porto	Barcelos
18:00 WET (UTC±0)		Report	Uribe 7'; Oliveira 60'	Stadium: Estádio Cidade de Barcelos; Attendance: 0 Referee: Nuno Almeida

14 March 2021 23	Porto	2–0	Paços de Ferreira	Porto
20:00 WET (UTC±0)	Pepe 77'; Oliveira 78'; Conceição (yellow card) 90'	Report	Maracás (yellow card) 62'; Costa (yellow card) 70'	Stadium: Estádio do Dragão; Attendance: 0 Referee: Tiago Martins

20 March 2021 24	Portimonense	1–2	Porto	Portimão
18:00 WET (UTC±0)	Dener (yellow card) 26'; Willyan (yellow card) 45+1'; Candé 64'; Beto (yellow card) 71'; Maurício (yellow card) 71'; Sá (red card) 90+6'	Report	Possignolo 45+1' (o.g.); Samuel 67' (o.g.); Marchesín (yellow card) 71'; Oliveira (yellow card) 90'	Stadium: Estádio Municipal de Portimão; Attendance: 0 Referee: Rui Costa

3 April 2021 25	Porto	2–1	Santa Clara	Porto
20:30 WEST (UTC+1)	Oliveira 49' (pen.); Manafá (yellow card) 53'; Leite (yellow card) 54'; Martínez (yellow card) 90+4', (goal) 90+5'	Report	Marco (yellow card) 47'; Carlos 56' (pen.), (yellow card) 73'; Nené (yellow card) 90+4'	Stadium: Estádio do Dragão; Attendance: 0 Referee: Hugo Miguel

10 April 2021 26	Tondela	0–2	Porto	Tondela
18:00 WEST (UTC+1)	Grau (yellow card) 39'; Medioub (yellow card) 48'; Bebeto (yellow card) 58'; Martínez (yellow card) 88'	Report	Martínez 19'; Otávio (yellow card) 60'; Taremi 83'	Stadium: Estádio João Cardoso; Attendance: 0 Referee: Fábio Veríssimo

18 April 2021 27	Nacional	0–1	Porto	Funchal
17:30 WEST (UTC+1)	Bessa (penalty missed) 6'; Camacho (yellow card) 42'; Gorré (yellow card) 56'; Rouaï (yellow card) 90'	Report	Taremi 20'; Manafá (yellow card) 81'	Stadium: Estádio da Madeira; Attendance: 0 Referee: João Pinheiro

22 April 2021 28	Porto	1–0	Vitória de Guimarães	Porto
21:00 WEST (UTC+1)	Marega 49', (yellow card) 74'	Report	Mensah (yellow card) 55'	Stadium: Estádio do Dragão; Attendance: 0 Referee: Tiago Martins

26 April 2021 29	Moreirense	1–1	Porto	Moreira de Cónegos
21:15 WEST (UTC+1)	Ferraresi 37'; Pacheco (yellow card) 45'; Martins (yellow card) 74'; Pasinato (yellow card) 74'	Report	Pepe (yellow card) 59'; Vieira (yellow card) 70'; Uribe (yellow card) 75'; Taremi (yellow card) 81', (goal) 86' (pen.)	Stadium: Parque Joaquim de Almeida Freitas; Attendance: 0 Referee: Hugo Miguel

30 April 2021 30	Porto	3–2	Famalicão	Porto
21:15 WEST (UTC+1)	Martínez 8'; Grujić (yellow card) 31', (goal) 75'; Taremi 61' (pen.)	Report	Rodrigues 44'; Queirós (yellow card) 57'; Figueiras (yellow card) 61'; Assunção (yellow card) 73'; Anderson 90+1'	Stadium: Estádio do Dragão; Attendance: 0 Referee: Nuno Almeida

6 May 2021 31	Benfica	1–1	Porto	Lisbon
18:30 WEST (UTC+1)	Everton 23'; Weigl (yellow card) 31'; Veríssimo (yellow card) 58'; Silva (yellow card) 60'; Leite (yellow card) 71'; Gabriel (yellow card) 81'; Pizzi (yellow card) 81'; Seferovic (yellow card) 83'; Gonçalves (yellow card) 89'	Report	Oliveira (yellow card) 15'; Pepe (yellow card) 64'; Uribe 75'; Mbemba (yellow card) 81'	Stadium: Estádio da Luz; Attendance: 0 Referee: Artur Soares Dias

10 May 2021 32	Porto	5–1	Farense	Porto
20:15 WEST (UTC+1)	Taremi 6' (pen.), 59'; Mbemba (yellow card) 13'; Martínez 14'; Díaz 20'; Grujić (yellow card) 25'; Leite (yellow card) 72'; João Mário (yellow card) 80', (goal) 84'	Report	Scheid (yellow card) 1'; Tavares (yellow card) 6'; Lucca (yellow card) 6'; Aouacheria (red card) 30'; César (yellow card) 82'; Licá 89'	Stadium: Estádio do Dragão; Attendance: 0 Referee: Tiago Martins

15 May 2021 33	Rio Ave	0–3	Porto	Vila do Conde
20:30 WEST (UTC+1)	Borevković (yellow card) 31'; Amaral (yellow card) 83'; Gabrielzinho (yellow card) 86'	Report	Martínez 56'; Díaz 59'; Oliveira 68'; Uribe (yellow card) 88'	Stadium: Estádio dos Arcos; Attendance: 0 Referee: Rui Costa

19 May 2021 34	Porto	4–0	Belenenses SAD	Porto
18:00 WEST (UTC+1)	Taremi 14'; Manafá (yellow card) 23'; Grujić 28'; Martínez 51'; Leite (yellow card) 63', (goal) 82'	Report	Phete (yellow card) 32'	Stadium: Estádio do Dragão; Attendance: 0 Referee: João Bento

=== Taça de Portugal ===
21 November 2020 Third round	Fabril	0–2	Porto	Barreiro
14:30 WET (UTC±0)		Report	Martínez 45+1'; Taremi 51'	Stadium: Complexo Desportivo Alfredo da Silva; Attendance: 0 Referee: João Bento

13 December 2020 Fourth round	Porto	2–1	Tondela	Porto
18:30 WET (UTC±0)	Taremi 4'; Marega 24'; Oliveira (yellow card) 45+2'	Report	Mendes 20'; Khacef (yellow card) 74'	Stadium: Estádio do Dragão; Attendance: 0 Referee: Fabio Verissimo

12 January 2021 Fifth round	Nacional	2–4 (a.e.t.)	Porto	Funchal
18:00 WET (UTC±0)	Róchez 25', (yellow card) 40'; Freitas (yellow card) 45+1'; Correia (yellow card) 53' (yellow-red card) 64'; Riascos 62'; Azouni (yellow card) 75'; Thill (penalty missed) 120'	Report	Díaz 22'; Taremi (yellow card) 45+2', (goal) 115'; Corona (yellow card) 59'; Evanilson 89'; Sanusi (yellow card) 94'; Oliveira 102'; Marega (yellow card) 117'	Stadium: Estádio da Madeira; Attendance: 0 Referee: António Nobre

29 January 2021 Quarter-finals	Gil Vicente	0–2	Porto	Barcelos
20:45 WET (UTC±0)	Rodrigão (yellow card) 30'; Gonçalves (yellow card) 43'; Mineiro (yellow card) 90+4'	Report	Corona 10'; Grujić (yellow card) 82'; Taremi 88'	Stadium: Estádio Cidade de Barcelos; Attendance: 0 Referee: Rui Costa

10 February 2021 Semi-finals; First leg	Braga	1–1	Porto	Braga
20:15 WET (UTC±0)	Sequeira (yellow card) 46'; Carmo (yellow card) 62'; Elmusrati (yellow card) 79'; A. Horta (yellow card) 90+10'; Esgaio (yellow card) 90+10'; Fransérgio 90+12'	Report	Taremi 9'; Sarr (yellow card) 25'; Díaz (red card) 70'; Costa (yellow card) 90+7'; Uribe (red card) 90+7'; Evanilson (yellow card) 90+11'	Stadium: Estádio Municipal de Braga; Attendance: 0 Referee: Luís Godinho

3 March 2021 Semi-finals; Second leg	Porto	2–3 (3–4 agg.)	Braga	Porto
20:15 WET (UTC±0)	Otávio 30', (yellow card) 84'; Marega 75'	Report	Ruiz 9', 14'; Piazon 28', (yellow card) 77'; Borja (red card) 34'; Esgaio (yellow card) 43'; Matheus (yellow card) 80'	Stadium: Estádio do Dragão; Attendance: 0 Referee: Artur Soares Dias

=== Taça da Liga ===
16 December 2020 Quarter-finals	Porto	2–1	Paços de Ferreira	Porto
18:45 WET (UTC±0)	Sarr 73'; Díaz 80'	Report	Castanheira 82'	Stadium: Estádio do Dragão; Attendance: 0 Referee: António Nobre

19 January 2021 Semi-finals	Sporting CP	2–1	Porto	Leiria
19:45 WET (UTC±0)	Porro (yellow card) 42'; Palhinha (yellow card) 52'; Coates (yellow card) 57'; Antunes (yellow card) 72'; Cabral 86', 90+4'	Report	Grujić (yellow card) 35'; Felipe Anderson (yellow card) 43'; Marega 79'; Vieira (yellow card) 90+6'	Stadium: Estádio Dr. Magalhães Pessoa; Attendance: 0 Referee: João Pinheiro

=== Supertaça Cândido de Oliveira ===
23 December 2020 Final	Porto	2–0	Benfica	Aveiro
20:45 WET (UTC±00:00)	Oliveira 25' (pen.), (yellow card) 53'; Pepe (yellow card) 36'; Mbemba (yellow card) 57'; Díaz 90'		Weigl (yellow card) 30'; Seferovic (yellow card) 90+3'	Stadium: Estádio Municipal de Aveiro; Attendance: 0 Referee: Hugo Miguel

=== UEFA Champions League ===
==== Group stage ====
The group stage draw was held on 1 October 2020.

Pos	Team	Pld	W	D	L	GF	GA	GD	Pts	Qualification	MCI	POR	OLY	MAR
1	(England) Manchester City	6	5	1	0	13	1	+12	16	Advance to knockout phase	—	3–1	3–0	3–0
2	(Portugal) Porto	6	4	1	1	10	3	+7	13	Advance to knockout phase	0–0	—	2–0	3–0
3	(Greece) Olympiacos	6	1	0	5	2	10	−8	3 (Note: Tied on head-to-head points (3). Head-to-head away goals: Olympiacos 1, Marseille 0.)	Transfer to Europa League	0–1	0–2	—	1–0
4	(France) Marseille	6	1	0	5	2	13	−11	3		0–3	0–2	2–1	—

Source: UEFA
Rules for classification: Group stage tiebreakers
Notes:

21 October 2020 1	Manchester City (England)	3–1	(Portugal) Porto	Manchester, England
20:00 BST (UTC+1)	Agüero 21' (pen.); Walker (yellow card) 28'; Silva (yellow card) 34'; Cancelo (yellow card) 36'; Gündoğan 65'; García (yellow card) 67'; Torres 73'; Fernandinho (yellow card) 90'	Report	Díaz 14'; Pepe (yellow card) 84'	Stadium: City of Manchester Stadium; Attendance: 0 (Note: Due to the COVID-19 pandemic in Europe, the match was played behind closed doors.); Referee: Andris Treimanis (Latvia)

27 October 2020 2	Porto (Portugal)	2–0	(Greece) Olympiacos	Porto, Portugal
20:00 WET (UTC±0)	Vieira 11'; Corona (yellow card) 61'; Uribe (yellow card) 82'; Oliveira 85'; Manafá (yellow card) 90'	Report	Fortounis (yellow card) 80'	Stadium: Estádio do Dragão; Attendance: 2,450; Referee: Daniel Siebert (Germany)

3 November 2020 3	Porto (Portugal)	3–0	(France) Marseille	Porto, Portugal
20:00 WET (UTC±0)	Marega 4'; Oliveira 28' (pen.), (yellow card) 32'; Díaz 69'	Report	Payet (penalty missed) 10'; Thauvin (yellow card) 36'; Kamara (yellow card) 58'; Amavi (yellow card) 64'; Álvaro (yellow card) 79'; Strootman (yellow card) 86'	Stadium: Estádio do Dragão; Attendance: 0 Referee: Antonio Mateu Lahoz (Spain)

25 November 2020 4	Marseille (France)	0–2	(Portugal) Porto	Marseille, France
21:00 CET (UTC+1)	Balerdi (yellow card) 29' (yellow-red card) 70'; Sanson (yellow card) 36'; Kamara (yellow card) 49'; Thauvin (yellow card) 54'; Payet (yellow card) 85'	Report	Sanusi 39'; Grujić (yellow card) 58' (yellow-red card) 67'; Oliveira 72' (pen.), (yellow card) 86'	Stadium: Stade Vélodrome; Attendance: 0 Referee: Andreas Ekberg (Sweden)

1 December 2020 5	Porto (Portugal)	0–0	(England) Manchester City	Porto, Portugal
21:00 WET (UTC±0)	Marega (yellow card) 68'	Report	Rodri (yellow card) 51'	Stadium: Estádio do Dragão; Attendance: 0 Referee: Björn Kuipers (Netherlands)

9 December 2020 6	Olympiacos (Greece)	0–2	(Portugal) Porto	Piraeus, Greece
22:00 EET (UTC+2)	Fortounis (yellow card) 43'; Semedo (yellow card) 52' (yellow-red card) 79'; Rafinha (yellow card) 70'	Report	Otávio 10' (pen.); Nanu (yellow card) 27'; Díaz (yellow card) 75'; Uribe 77'	Stadium: Karaiskakis Stadium; Attendance: 0 Referee: Felix Brych (Germany)

==== Knockout phase ====
===== Round of 16 =====
The draw for the round of 16 was held on 14 December 2020.

17 February 2021 First leg	Porto (Portugal)	2–1	(Italy) Juventus	Porto, Portugal
21:00 CET (UTC+1)	Taremi 2'; Marega 46'	Report	De Ligt (yellow card) 63'; Danilo (yellow card) 81'; Chiesa 82'; Demiral (yellow card) 87'; Alex Sandro (yellow card) 90+2'	Stadium: Estádio do Dragão; Attendance: 0 Referee: Carlos del Cerro Grande (Spain)

9 March 2021 Second leg	Juventus (Italy)	3–2 (a.e.t.) (4–4 (a) agg.)	(Portugal) Porto	Turin, Italy
21:00 CET (UTC+1)	Chiesa 49', 63', (yellow card) 90+3'; Cuadrado (yellow card) 92'; Bernardeschi (yellow card) 103'; Rabiot (yellow card) 114', (goal) 117'	Report	Oliveira 19' (pen.), 115', (yellow card) 97'; Otávio (yellow card) 45+2'; Taremi (yellow card) 52' (yellow-red card) 54'; Mbemba (yellow card) 120+2'	Stadium: Juventus Stadium; Attendance: 0 Referee: Björn Kuipers (Netherlands)

===== Quarter-finals =====
The draw for the quarter-finals was held on 19 March 2021.

7 April 2021 First leg	Porto (Portugal)	0–2	(England) Chelsea	Seville, Spain
20:00 WEST (UTC+1)	Mbemba (yellow card) 63'; Grujić (yellow card) 79'	Report	Mount 32'; Chilwell 85'	Stadium: Ramón Sánchez Pizjuán; Attendance: 0 Referee: Slavko Vinčić (Slovenia)
Note: The match was played at Ramón Sánchez Pizjuán in Seville, due to travel restrictions related to the COVID-19 pandemic between Portugal and the United Kingdom.

13 April 2021 Second leg	Chelsea (England)	0–1 (2–1 agg.)	(Portugal) Porto	Seville, Spain
20:00 BST (UTC+1)		Report	Oliveira (yellow card) 46'; Corona (yellow card) 74'; Pepe (yellow card) 82'; Díaz (yellow card) 88'; Taremi 90+4', (yellow card) 90+5'	Stadium: Ramón Sánchez Pizjuán; Attendance: 0 Referee: Clément Turpin (France)
Note: The match was played at Ramón Sánchez Pizjuán in Seville, due to travel restrictions related to the COVID-19 pandemic between Portugal and the United Kingdom.

== Statistics ==
As of 22 February 2021

=== Appearances and discipline ===
Numbers in parentheses denote appearances as substitute.

No.	Pos.	Player	Primeira Liga				Taça de Portugal				Taça da Liga				Supertaça				Champions League				Total			
No.	Pos.	Player	Apps	Yellow card	Second yellow card	Red card	Apps	Yellow card	Second yellow card	Red card	Apps	Yellow card	Second yellow card	Red card	Apps	Yellow card	Second yellow card	Red card	Apps	Yellow card	Second yellow card	Red card	Apps	Yellow card	Second yellow card	Red card
1	GK	(Argentina) Agustín Marchesín	33 (0)	2	0	0	0 (0)	0	0	0	0 (0)	0	0	0	1 (0)	0	0	0	6 (0)	0	0	0	26 (0)	2	0	0
3	DF	(Portugal) Pepe	14 (1)	3	0	0	3 (0)	0	0	0	2 (0)	0	0	0	1 (0)	1	0	0	3 (0)	1	0	0	23 (1)	5	0	0
4	DF	(Portugal) Diogo Leite	6 (4)	0	0	0	2 (0)	0	0	0	2 (0)	0	0	0	1 (1)	0	0	0	2 (0)	0	0	0	13 (5)	0	0	0
5	DF	(Spain) Iván Marcano	0 (0)	0	0	0	0 (0)	0	0	0	0 (0)	0	0	0	0 (0)	0	0	0	0 (0)	0	0	0	0 (0)	0	0	0
6	MF	(Senegal) Mamadou Loum	3 (3)	0	0	0	3 (2)	0	0	0	0 (0)	0	0	0	0 (0)	0	0	0	2 (2)	0	0	0	8 (7)	0	0	0
7	FW	(Colombia) Luis Díaz	16 (6)	0	0	0	5 (2)	0	0	1	1 (0)	0	0	0	1 (1)	0	0	0	6 (3)	1	0	0	29(12)	1	0	1
8	MF	(Colombia) Mateus Uribe	18 (1)	5	1	0	2 (0)	0	0	1	2 (0)	1	0	0	1 (0)	0	0	0	6 (1)	1	0	0	29 (2)	7	1	1
9	FW	(Iran) Mehdi Taremi	20 (7)	0	0	1	5 (0)	1	0	0	1 (1)	0	0	0	1 (0)	0	0	0	4 (3)	0	0	0	31(11)	1	0	1
10	FW	(Japan) Shoya Nakajima	4 (3)	1	0	0	1 (0)	0	0	0	0 (0)	0	0	0	0 (0)	0	0	0	4 (4)	0	0	0	9 (7)	1	0	0
11	FW	(Mali) Moussa Marega	20 (3)	2	0	0	3 (1)	1	0	0	1 (0)	0	0	0	1 (0)	0	0	0	6 (0)	1	0	0	31 (4)	4	0	0
12	DF	(Nigeria) Zaidu Sanusi	18 (5)	3	1	0	3 (1)	1	0	0	1 (0)	0	0	0	1 (0)	0	0	0	7 (0)	0	0	0	30 (6)	4	1	0
13	DF	(Brazil) Alex Telles	3 (0)	0	0	0	0 (0)	0	0	0	0 (0)	0	0	0	0 (0)	0	0	0	0 (0)	0	0	0	3 (0)	0	0	0
14	GK	(Portugal) Cláudio Ramos	0 (0)	0	0	0	0 (0)	0	0	0	0 (0)	0	0	0	0 (0)	0	0	0	0 (0)	0	0	0	0 (0)	0	0	0
15	DF	(Portugal) Carraça	1 (1)	0	0	0	1 (0)	0	0	0	0 (0)	0	0	0	0 (0)	0	0	0	0 (0)	0	0	0	2 (1)	0	0	0
16	MF	(Serbia) Marko Grujić	12 (9)	1	0	0	4 (1)	1	0	0	2 (1)	1	0	0	1 (1)	0	0	0	5 (3)	2	1	0	24(15)	5	1	0
17	FW	(Mexico) Jesús Corona	20 (2)	6	1	0	4 (1)	1	0	0	2 (0)	1	0	0	1 (0)	0	0	0	7 (1)	1	0	0	34 (4)	9	1	0
18	DF	(Portugal) Wilson Manafá	17 (0)	1	0	0	4 (0)	0	0	0	2 (2)	0	0	0	1 (0)	0	0	0	6 (1)	1	0	0	30 (3)	2	0	0
19	DF	(Democratic Republic of the Congo) Chancel Mbemba	18 (0)	3	0	0	3 (0)	0	0	0	1 (0)	0	0	0	1 (0)	1	0	0	7 (0)	0	0	0	30 (0)	4	0	0
20	FW	(Cape Verde) Zé Luís	1 (1)	0	0	0	0 (0)	0	0	0	0 (0)	0	0	0	0 (0)	0	0	0	0 (0)	0	0	0	1 (1)	0	0	0
21	MF	(Portugal) Romário Baró	6 (5)	1	0	0	2 (1)	1	0	0	0 (0)	0	0	0	1 (1)	0	0	0	3 (2)	0	0	0	12 (9)	2	0	0
22	MF	(Portugal) Danilo Pereira	3 (0)	0	0	0	0 (0)	0	0	0	0 (0)	0	0	0	0 (0)	0	0	0	0 (0)	0	0	0	3 (0)	0	0	0
23	MF	(Portugal) João Mário	10 (9)	1	0	0	3 (3)	0	0	0	2 (1)	0	0	0	0 (0)	0	0	0	2 (1)	0	0	0	17(14)	1	0	0
25	MF	(Brazil) Otávio	13 (2)	2	0	0	4 (1)	0	0	0	1 (1)	0	0	0	1 (0)	0	0	0	6 (0)	0	0	0	25 (4)	2	0	0
27	MF	(Portugal) Sérgio Oliveira	19 (1)	3	0	0	5 (2)	1	0	0	1 (0)	0	0	0	1 (0)	1	0	0	6 (0)	2	0	0	32 (3)	7	0	0
28	MF	(Brazil) Felipe Anderson	4 (3)	0	0	0	2 (1)	0	0	0	2 (0)	1	0	0	0 (0)	0	0	0	1 (0)	0	0	0	9 (4)	1	0	0
29	FW	(Spain) Toni Martínez	7 (5)	1	0	0	3 (1)	0	0	0	2 (1)	0	0	0	1 (1)	0	0	0	1 (0)	0	0	0	14 (8)	1	0	0
30	FW	(Brazil) Evanilson	8 (5)	2	0	0	3 (3)	1	0	0	0 (0)	0	0	0	0 (0)	0	0	0	4 (4)	0	0	0	15(12)	3	0	0
31	DF	(Guinea-Bissau) Nanu	9 (2)	0	0	0	1 (0)	0	0	0	2 (1)	0	0	0	0 (0)	0	0	0	3 (2)	1	0	0	15 (5)	1	0	0
32	DF	(France) Malang Sarr	7 (2)	0	0	0	3 (0)	1	0	0	1 (0)	0	0	0	0 (0)	0	0	0	5 (1)	0	0	0	16 (3)	1	0	0
50	MF	(Portugal) Fábio Vieira	13(10)	0	0	0	3 (2)	0	0	0	1 (1)	1	0	0	0 (0)	0	0	0	4 (2)	0	0	0	21(15)	1	0	0
99	GK	(Portugal) Diogo Costa	1 (0)	0	0	0	5 (0)	1	0	0	2 (0)	0	0	0	0 (0)	0	0	0	1 (0)	0	0	0	9 (0)	1	0	0
Totals				37	3	1		10	0	2		5	0	0		3	0	0		11	1	0		56	4	3

=== Goalscorers ===
Rank	No.	Pos.	Player	Primeira Liga	Taça de Portugal	Taça da Liga	Supertaça	Champions League	Total
1	9	FW	(Iran) Mehdi Taremi	16	5	0	0	2	23
2	27	FW	(Portugal) Sérgio Oliveira	12	1	0	1	5	19
3	11	FW	(Mali) Moussa Marega	6	1	1	0	2	10
4	7	FW	(Colombia) Luis Díaz	4	1	1	1	2	9
5	25	MF	(Brazil) Otávio	3	0	0	0	1	4
5	30	FW	(Brazil) Evanilson	3	1	0	0	0	4
7	17	FW	(Mexico) Jesús Corona	2	1	0	0	0	3
8	8	MF	(Colombia) Mateus Uribe	2	0	0	0	1	3
8	12	MF	(Nigeria) Zaidu Sanusi	1	0	0	0	1	2
8	13	DF	(Brazil) Alex Telles	2	0	0	0	0	2
8	29	FW	(Spain) Toni Martínez	4	1	0	0	0	5
12	3	DF	(Portugal) Pepe	1	0	0	0	0	1
12	19	DF	(Democratic Republic of the Congo) Chancel Mbemba	1	0	0	0	0	1
12	23	FW	(Portugal) João Mário	1	0	0	0	0	1
12	32	DF	(France) Malang Sarr	0	0	1	0	0	1
12	50	MF	(Portugal) Fábio Vieira	0	0	0	0	1	1
Totals				45	11	3	2	12	73

=== Clean sheets ===
No.	Player	Primeira Liga	Taça de Portugal	Taça da Liga	Supertaça	Champions League	Total
1	(Argentina) Agustín Marchesín	8	0	0	1	4	13
99	(Portugal) Diogo Costa	0	2	0	0	1	3
Totals		8	2	0	1	5	16
