= Wilson Manafá =

Portuguese footballer (born 1994)

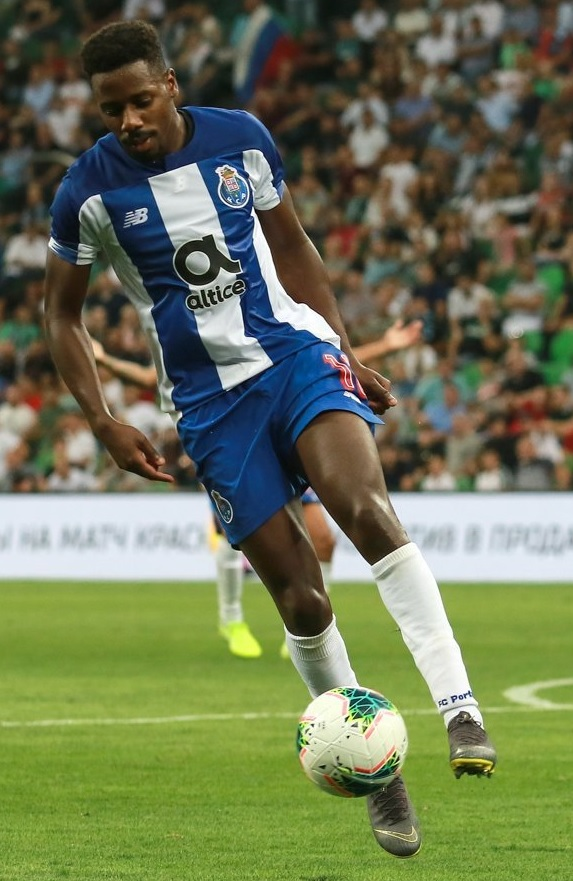
- Manafá with Porto in 2019

Personal information
- Full name: Wilson Migueis Manafá Jancó
- Date of birth: 23 July 1994 (age 32)
- Place of birth: Oliveira do Bairro, Portugal
- Height: 1.74 m (5 ft 9 in)
- Positions: Full-back; winger

Team information
- Current team: Shanghai Shenhua
- Number: 13

Youth career
- 2002–2012: Oliveira Bairro
- 2012–2013: Sporting CP

Senior career*
Years	Team	Apps	(Gls)
2012	Oliveira Bairro	5	(0)
2013–2015	Sporting CP B	13	(0)
2015	Beira-Mar	19	(1)
2015–2016	Anadia	10	(4)
2016	Varzim	21	(1)
2016–2019	Portimonense	71	(5)
2019–2023	Porto	85	(2)
2022–2023	Porto B	8	(0)
2023–2024	Granada	4	(0)
2024–	Shanghai Shenhua	75	(0)
- * Club domestic league appearances and goals as of 19 November 2026

Wilson Migueis Manafá Jancó (born 23 July 1994), known as Manafá, is a Portuguese professional footballer who plays as a full-back or a winger for Chinese Super League club Shanghai Shenhua.

After making his Primeira Liga debut for Portimonense at the age of 23 he transferred to Porto for €7 million in 2019, going on to play 130 games and win two league and Taça de Portugal doubles.

== Club career ==
=== Early years ===
Born in Oliveira do Bairro, Aveiro District of Angolan and Bissau-Guinean descent, Manafá finished his development at Sporting CP. He made his professional debut with their reserves in the Segunda Liga, his first appearance in the competition being on 11 August 2013 when he came on as a 43rd-minute substitute in a 1–0 away loss against Atlético Clube de Portugal.

In the following years, Manafá alternated between the second and third divisions, representing Beira-Mar, Anadia and Varzim. He scored his first goal in the former competition on 4 April 2015 while at the service of the first club, in a 3–0 away victory over Trofense.

=== Portimonense ===
In late May 2016, Manafá joined Portimonense on a three-year contract. In his first season, he netted three times in 38 matches to help the Algarve team return to the Primeira Liga after a six-year absence.

Manafá made his debut in the Portuguese top tier on 7 August 2017, playing 16 minutes in a 2–1 home win against Boavista and providing the assist for Bruno Tabata's winner. He scored his first league goal on 25 August of the following year, also putting one past his own net in a 2–2 draw with Santa Clara also at the Estádio Municipal de Portimão. During the latter campaign, he was reconverted by manager António Folha to a full-back.

=== Porto ===
On 21 January 2019, Manafá signed a four-and-a-half-year deal with Porto; the initial transfer fee was €3 million for 60% of the player's economic rights, with the remainder bought for €4 million in 2020–21. He made his debut nine days later in a 3–0 home win over B-SAD, playing the final ten minutes in place of Éder Militão, and scored his first goal on 4 May in a 4–0 defeat of Aves also at the Estádio do Dragão. His team lost two finals on penalties to Sporting that season: the Taça da Liga in which he was an unused substitute, and the Taça de Portugal in which he came off the bench in the 77th minute.

Manafá started regularly under Sérgio Conceição, but eventually lost his position to João Mário on the right flank and Zaidu Sanusi on the left. On 30 December 2021, shortly after having replaced the former in O Clássico against Benfica, he suffered a serious injury to his right-knee patellar tendon, subsequently undergoing surgery and missing the rest of the season.

Still injured, Manafá was one of four Porto players suspended for the 2022 Supertaça Cândido de Oliveira and fined €510 for having made insults towards Benfica during title celebrations. After recovering, he started playing again with the reserves in the second tier.

=== Later career ===
On 7 August 2023, free agent Manafá signed for Granada, newly-promoted to La Liga. Having arrived injured, he only made five appearances during his spell in Andalusia, his league bow coming on 5 November in a 1–0 away loss to Valencia where he played ten minutes.

Manafá was meant to move to Brazil in January 2024, joining Série A club Botafogo on a two-year contract. However, even after being officially announced, the deal fell through and he stayed at Granada.

On 28 January 2024, Manafá moved to Shanghai Shenhua in the Chinese Super League.

== Career statistics ==
As of match played 9 May 2026

Appearances and goals by club, season and competition
Club	Season	League			National cup		League cup		Continental		Other		Total	
Club	Season	Division	Apps	Goals	Apps	Goals	Apps	Goals	Apps	Goals	Apps	Goals	Apps	Goals
Oliveira do Bairro	2011–12	Segunda Divisão	5	0	0	0	—		—		—		5	0
Sporting CP B	2012–13	Segunda Liga	0	0	—		—		—		—		0	0
Sporting CP B	2013–14	Segunda Liga	13	0	—		—		—		—		13	0
Sporting CP B	Total		13	0	—		—		—		—		13	0
Beira-Mar	2014–15	Segunda Liga	19	1	0	0	0	0	—		—		19	1
Anadia	2015–16	Campeonato de Portugal	10	4	1	0	—		—		—		11	4
Varzim	2015–16	LigaPro	21	1	0	0	0	0	—		—		21	1
Portimonense	2016–17	LigaPro	38	3	1	0	1	0	—		—		40	3
Portimonense	2017–18	Primeira Liga	18	0	1	0	3	0	—		—		22	0
Portimonense	2018–19	Primeira Liga	15	2	1	0	1	0	—		—		17	2
Portimonense	Total		71	5	3	0	5	0	—		—		79	5
Porto	2018–19	Primeira Liga	14	1	3	0	0	0	0	0	0	0	17	1
Porto	2019–20	Primeira Liga	27	1	7	0	5	0	6 (Note: One appearance in UEFA Champions League, five appearances in UEFA Europa League)	0	—		45	1
Porto	2020–21	Primeira Liga	31	0	5	0	2	0	9 (Note: Appearances in UEFA Champions League)	0	1 (Note: Appearance in Supertaça Cândido de Oliveira)	0	48	0
Porto	2021–22	Primeira Liga	6	0	2	0	2	0	0	0	—		10	0
Porto	2022–23	Primeira Liga	7	0	3	0	0	0	0	0	0	0	10	0
Porto	Total		85	2	20	0	9	0	15	0	1	0	130	2
Porto B	2022–23	Liga Portugal 2	8	0	—		—		—		—		8	0
Granada	2023–24	La Liga	4	0	1	0	—		—		—		5	0
Shanghai Shenhua	2024	Chinese Super League	19	0	0	0	—		3 (Note: Appearance in AFC Champions League Elite)	0	1 (Note: Appearance in Chinese Super Cup)	0	23	0
Shanghai Shenhua	2025	Chinese Super League	30	0	2	1	—		9	0	1	0	42	1
Shanghai Shenhua	2026	Chinese Super League	11	0	0	0	—		2	0	—		13	0
Shanghai Shenhua	Total		60	0	2	1	—		14	0	2	0	78	1
Career total			296	13	27	1	14	0	29	0	3	0	369	14

== Honours ==
Porto

- Primeira Liga: 2019–20, 2021–22
- Taça de Portugal: 2019–20, 2021–22, 2022–23
- Supertaça Cândido de Oliveira: 2020

Shanghai Shenhua

- Chinese FA Super Cup: 2024, 2025
