= Agustín Marchesín =

Argentine footballer

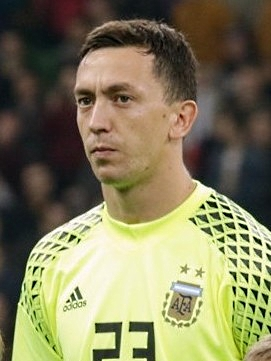
- Marchesín with Argentina in 2017

Personal information
- Full name: Agustín Federico Marchesín
- Date of birth: 16 March 1988 (age 38)
- Place of birth: San Cayetano, Argentina
- Height: 1.88 m (6 ft 2 in)
- Position: Goalkeeper

Team information
- Current team: Boca Juniors

Youth career
- San Cayetano
- Huracán Tres Arroyos
- 2007–2009: Lanús

Senior career*
Years	Team	Apps	(Gls)
2009–2014	Lanús	178	(0)
2014–2016	Santos Laguna	72	(0)
2016–2019	América	105	(0)
2019–2022	Porto	65	(0)
2022–2024	Celta	19	(0)
2024–2025	Grêmio	35	(0)
2025–	Boca Juniors	46	(0)

International career^{‡}
2011–2021	Argentina	8	(0)
Medal record
Men's football
Representing Argentina
Copa América
Winner	2021 Brazil
Runner-up	2015 Chile
Bronze medal – third place	2019 Brazil
- * Club domestic league appearances and goals as of 17:08, 16 June 2026 (UTC) ‡ National team caps and goals as of 9 June 2021 (UTC)

Agustín Federico Marchesín (Spanish pronunciation: [maɾtʃeˈsin]; born 16 March 1988) is an Argentine professional footballer who plays as a goalkeeper for Argentine Primera División club Boca Juniors.

He began his career with Lanús, making 222 appearances and winning the Copa Sudamericana in 2013. He then spent five years in Mexico's Liga MX, winning league titles with Santos Laguna and Club América. He joined Porto in 2019, where he won the Primeira Liga and Taça de Portugal double twice, and later played top-flight football in Spain and Brazil for Celta Vigo and Grêmio.

Marchesín made his international debut for Argentina in 2011, and was part of their squads at three Copa América tournaments. They came runners-up in 2015, third in 2019 and won in 2021.

== Club career ==
=== Lanús ===
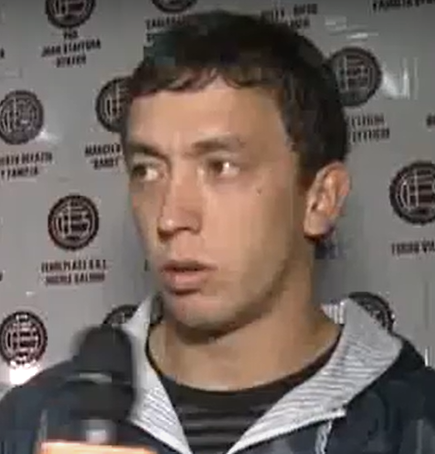
Marchesín in 2012

In 2007, Marchesín was signed by Club Atlético Lanús from regional club Huracán de Tres Arroyos (which he was already a first team member since 2005, but did not play). He was a non-playing member of the Lanús squad that won the 2007 Apertura tournament.

On 1 March 2009, Marchesín made his competitive debut in a 2–0 win against Gimnasia y Esgrima de Jujuy. On 29 April, he made his first appearance in the Copa Libertadores, a 1–1 draw against Caracas FC. That year, he relegated Mauricio Caranta to the bench and established himself as first-choice goalkeeper, playing in most of Lanús' games of the Apertura tournament.

In 2013, Marchesín won the Copa Sudamericana with Lanús, starting in both matches of the finals against Ponte Preta of Brazil.

=== Santos Laguna ===
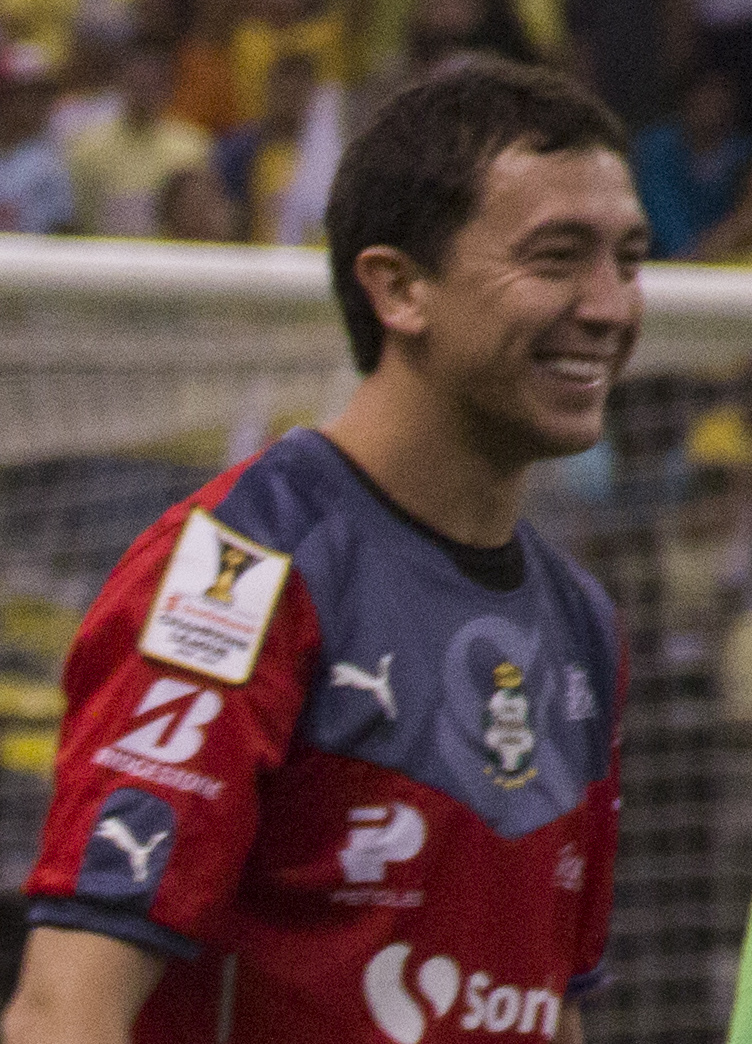
Marchesín in 2016.

In December 2014, Marchesín, along with Lanús teammate Diego González, was sold to Mexican side Santos Laguna as a replacement for retiring goalkeeper Oswaldo Sánchez. In his first year at the club, he won the 2015 Clausura and 2015 Campeón de Campeones cup.

=== América ===
On 2 December 2016, it was announced that Santos Laguna had sold Marchesín to Club América.

Marchesín made his 100th league appearance in Mexico in América's 2–1 win against Toluca on 30 September 2017.

On 16 December 2018, Marchesín won his first league title with América following a 2–0 aggregate victory over Cruz Azul in the Apertura finals.

=== Porto ===
On 31 July 2019, Marchesín moved to Portugal's FC Porto on a four-year deal, for an undisclosed amount reported as €7.2 million. He joined as a replacement for Iker Casillas, who had suffered a heart attack in May. He made his debut on 7 August in the first leg of the third qualifying round of the UEFA Champions League away to FC Krasnodar in Russia, making a late save from Rémy Cabella. He was the Primeira Liga Goalkeeper of the Month in each of his first four months. Porto won the league and Taça de Portugal double, and he was named Goalkeeper of the Year and made the Team of the Year. In November 2019, he missed the local derby with Boavista F.C. due to internal suspension for having partied until early in the morning with teammates Luis Díaz, Mateus Uribe and Renzo Saravia.

Marchesín missed the start of the 2021–22 season through a meniscus injury to his right knee, and was replaced by youngster Diogo Costa. In a title-winning campaign, he played only three minutes in a 2–0 win at F.C. Arouca on 6 February. Five days later, he was one of four players sent off in a melee at the end of a 2–2 draw with Sporting CP, and was handed a two-game suspension; on 7 December he was also dismissed without playing in a similar event against Atlético Madrid in the Champions League group stage.

Marchesín was first-choice as Porto won the 2021–22 Taça de Portugal, including the 3–1 final win over C.D. Tondela on 22 May. On 30 July, days before leaving the club, he played in the 2022 Supertaça Cândido de Oliveira win over the same opposition due to Costa's suspension.

=== Later career ===
On 2 August 2022, La Liga side Celta de Vigo signed Marchesín on a three-year deal with the option of one more. He made his debut 11 days later as the season began with a 2–2 home draw against RCD Espanyol, conceding the equaliser from Joselu's penalty in the seventh minute of added time.

On 10 January 2024, Marchesín moved to Brazil, signing a two-year contract with Grêmio. In his one season in the Campeonato Brasileiro Série A, he played the majority of fixtures, beating competition from Caíque.

Marchesín returned to Argentine football for the first time in over a decade in January 2025, joining Boca Juniors. The transfer fee was around $2 million in U.S. dollars.

== International career ==
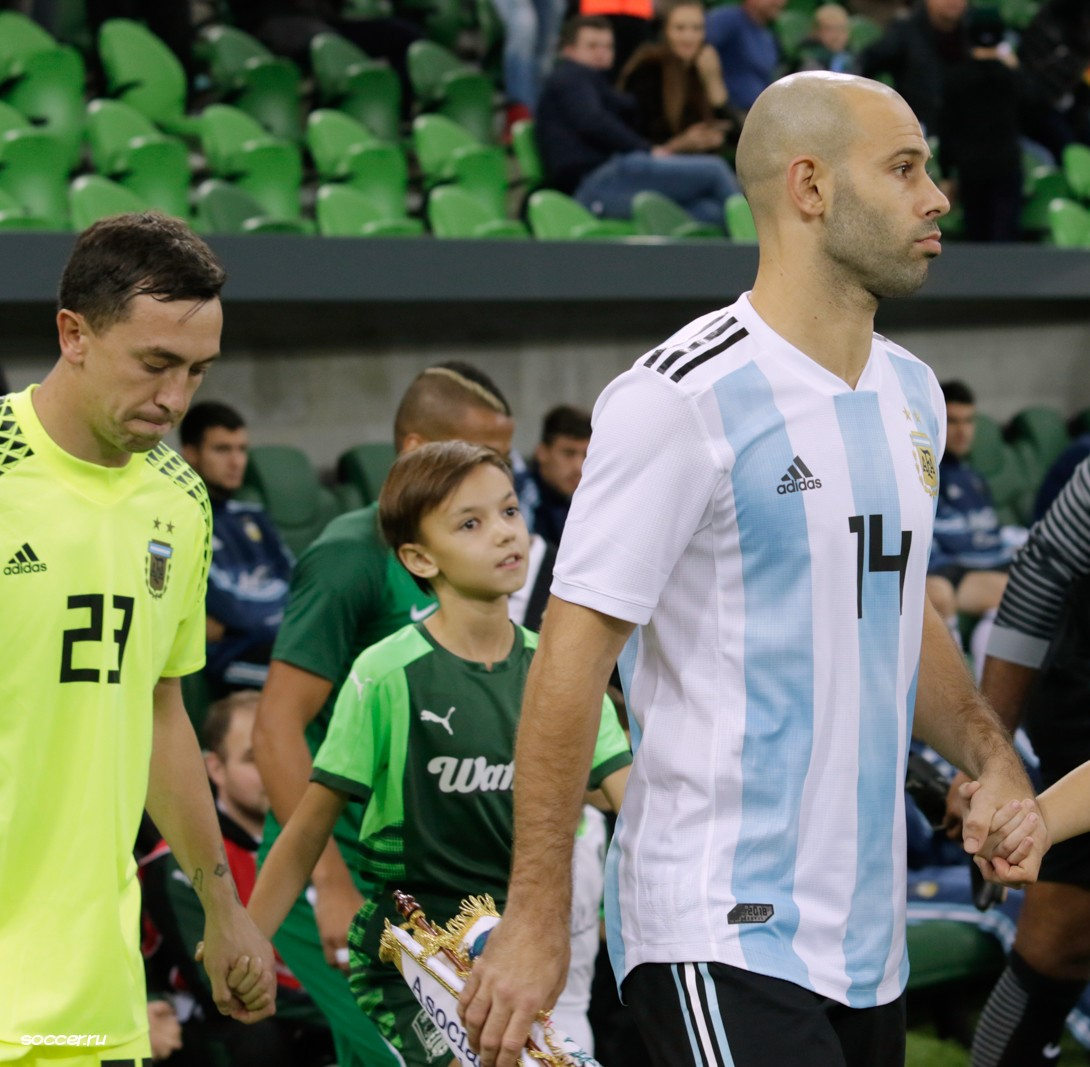
Marchesín (left) entering the pitch for Argentina against Nigeria in 2017

Marchesín was the starting goalkeeper for the Argentina national U21 team that finished third at the 2009 Toulon Tournament. On 20 August 2010, Marchesín received his first call for the senior national team for a friendly match against Spain. Marchesín got his first cap in a friendly match against Venezuela as a half-time substitute for Javier Hernán García on 16 March 2011, with Argentina winning the match 4–1 in San Juan.

In September 2014, Marchesín received his first call-up in more than three years when Gerardo Martino called him up for the friendly matches against Brazil and Hong Kong, playing against the latter and earning his second cap. He was called up for the 2015 Copa América after Mariano Andújar suffered a hand injury midway through the tournament.

On 15 September 2017, Marchesín received his first call-up under Jorge Sampaoli for the 2018 FIFA World Cup Qualification matches against Peru and Ecuador on 2 and 5 October. On 14 November, he made his first start for the national team in a 4–2 friendly loss to Nigeria in Krasnodar, Russia.

In May 2019, Marchesín was included in Argentina's 23-man squad for the 2019 Copa América. He was also named in the 28-man squad for the 2021 edition, which they won for the first time since 1993. On 8 June that year, he made his competitive debut when Emiliano Martínez was injured in a 2022 FIFA World Cup qualification match away to Colombia, and made an added-time error that allowed Miguel Borja to make it 2–2.

== Personal life ==
As of January 2025, Marchesín was married to Sol, with whom he had been in a relationship for over 20 years; the couple had a son and a daughter.

== Career statistics ==
=== Club ===
As of 24 September 2023

Appearances and goals by club, season and competition
Club	Season	League			National Cup		League Cup		Continental		Other		Total	
Club	Season	Division	Apps	Goals	Apps	Goals	Apps	Goals	Apps	Goals	Apps	Goals	Apps	Goals
Lanús	2008–09	Primera División	1	0	–		–		1	0	–		2	0
Lanús	2009–10	Primera División	29	0	–		–		6	0	–		35	0
Lanús	2010–11	Primera División	22	0	–		–		2	0	–		24	0
Lanús	2011–12	Primera División	36	0	–		–		8	0	–		44	0
Lanús	2012–13	Primera División	37	0	2	0	–		10	0	–		49	0
Lanús	2013–14	Primera División	37	0	1	0	–		1	0	–		39	0
Lanús	2014	Primera División	16	0	–		–		10	0	3	0	29	0
Lanús	Total		178	0	3	0	–		38	0	3	0	222	0
Santos Laguna	2014–15	Liga MX	22	0	4	0	–		–		–		26	0
Santos Laguna	2015–16	Liga MX	34	0	–		–		8	0	1	0	43	0
Santos Laguna	2016–17	Liga MX	16	0	3	0	–		–		–		19	0
Santos Laguna	Total		72	0	7	0	–		8	0	1	0	88	0
América	2016–17	Liga MX	17	0	5	0	–		–		–		22	0
América	2017–18	Liga MX	42	0	3	0	–		5	0	1	0	51	0
América	2018–19	Liga MX	44	0	9	0	–		—		—		53	0
América	2019–20	Liga MX	2	0	–		—		0	0	1	0	3	0
América	Total		105	0	17	0	–		5	0	2	0	129	0
Porto	2019–20	Primeira Liga	31	0	1	0	–		10	0	0	0	42	0
Porto	2020–21	Primeira Liga	33	0	0	0	0	0	9	0	1	0	43	0
Porto	2021–22	Primeira Liga	1	0	7	0	1	0	0	0	0	0	9	0
Porto	2022–23	Primeira Liga	0	0	0	0	0	0	0	0	1	0	1	0
Porto	Total		65	0	8	0	1	0	19	0	2	0	95	0
Celta	2022–23	La Liga	19	0	1	0	–		–		–		20	0
Career total			439	0	36	0	1	0	70	0	8	0	554	0

=== International ===
As of 9 June 2021

Appearances and goals by national team and year
National team	Year	Apps	Goals
Argentina	2011	1	0
Argentina	2012	0	0
Argentina	2013	0	0
Argentina	2014	1	0
Argentina	2015	0	0
Argentina	2016	0	0
Argentina	2017	1	0
Argentina	2018	1	0
Argentina	2019	3	0
Argentina	2020	0	0
Argentina	2021	1	0
Total		8	0

== Honours ==
Lanús

- Copa Sudamericana: 2013

Santos Laguna

- Liga MX: Clausura 2015
- Campeón de Campeones: 2015

América

- Liga MX: Apertura 2018
- Copa MX: Clausura 2019
- Campeón de Campeones: 2019

Porto

- Primeira Liga: 2019–20, 2021–22
- Taça de Portugal: 2019–20, 2021–22
- Supertaça Cândido de Oliveira: 2020, 2022

Grêmio

- Campeonato Gaúcho: 2024

Boca Juniors

- Argentine Primera División: 2026 Liga

Argentina

- Copa América: 2021

Individual

- Toulon Tournament Best Goalkeeper: 2009
- Ubaldo Fillol Award: Torneo Inicial 2012
- Liga MX Golden Glove: 2015–16, 2018–19
- Liga MX Best XI: Apertura 2017, Clausura 2018, Apertura 2018
- Primeira Liga Team of the Year: 2019–20
- Primeira Liga Goalkeeper of the Year: 2019–20
