= Marko Grujić =

Serbian footballer (born 1996)

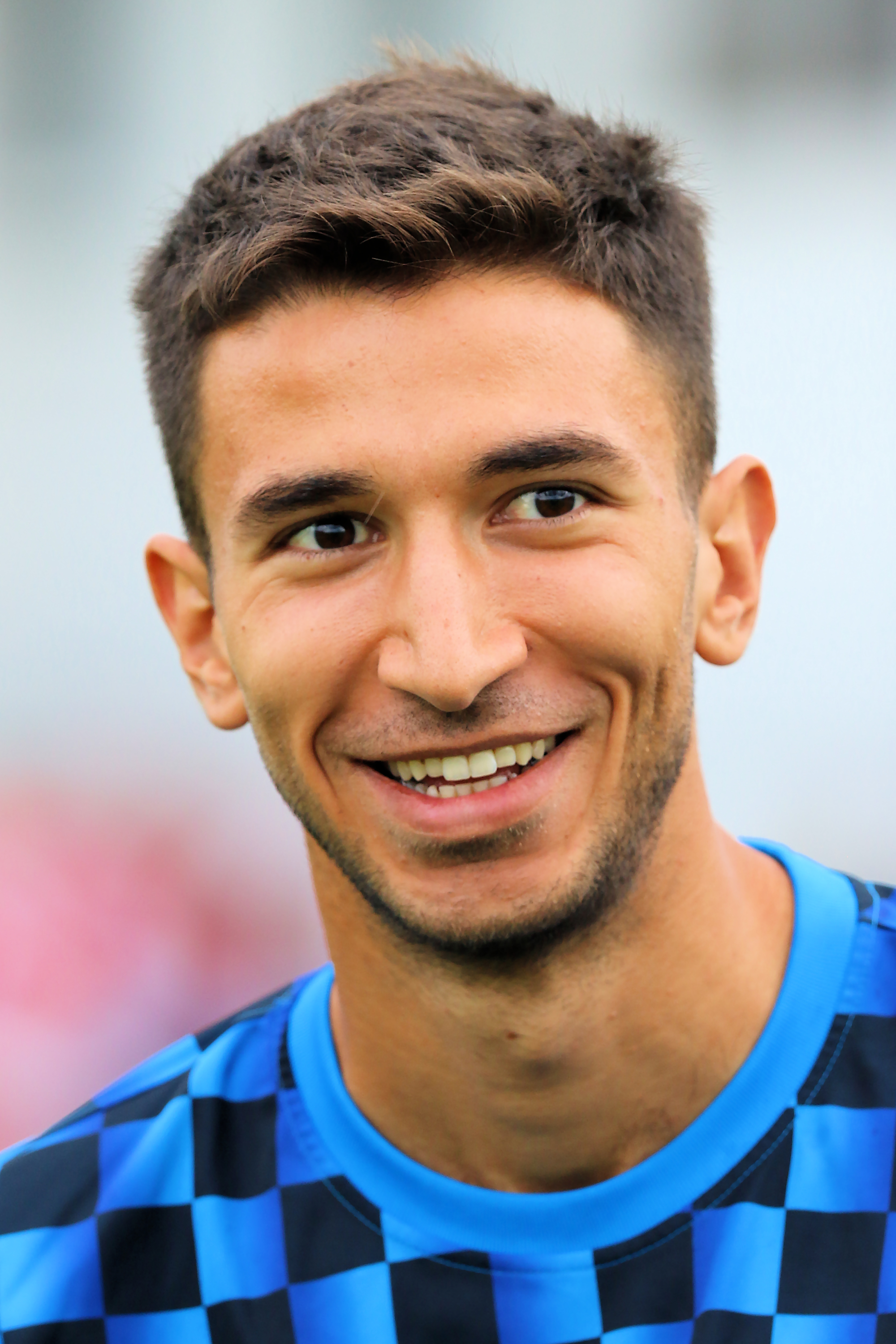
- Grujić with Hertha BSC in 2019

Personal information
- Full name: Marko Grujić
- Date of birth: 13 April 1996 (age 30)
- Place of birth: Belgrade, Serbia, FR Yugoslavia
- Height: 1.91 m (6 ft 3 in)
- Position: Midfielder

Team information
- Current team: Levski Sofia
- Number: 8

Youth career
- 2005–2013: Red Star Belgrade

Senior career*
Years	Team	Apps	(Gls)
2013–2016	Red Star Belgrade	39	(6)
2014	→ Kolubara (loan)	5	(2)
2016–2021	Liverpool	8	(0)
2018	→ Cardiff City (loan)	13	(1)
2018–2020	→ Hertha BSC (loan)	51	(9)
2020–2021	→ Porto (loan)	23	(2)
2021–2025	Porto	57	(2)
2025–2026	AEK Athens	10	(1)
2026–	Levski Sofia	10	(1)

International career^{‡}
2011–2012	Serbia U16	4	(2)
2012	Serbia U17	1	(1)
2014–2015	Serbia U19	3	(0)
2015	Serbia U20	7	(0)
2015–2017	Serbia U21	13	(0)
2016–	Serbia	30	(0)
Medal record
Men's Football
Representing Serbia
FIFA U-20 World Cup
Gold medal – first place	2015 New Zealand	U-20 Team
- * Club domestic league appearances and goals as of 15:23, 22 November 2026 (UTC) ‡ National team caps and goals as of 16 November 2025

Marko Grujić (Serbian Cyrillic: Марко Грујић, pronounced [mâːrko ɡrûːjitɕ]; born 13 April 1996) is a Serbian professional footballer who plays as a midfielder for Bulgarian First League club Levski Sofia and the Serbia national team.

A native of Belgrade, Grujić started his career with his hometown club Red Star Belgrade, progressing through their youth system to the first team squad. He made his professional debut in 2013, and won the SuperLiga title in his final season with Red Star before completing a £5.1 million move to Liverpool. After five years with the Premier League club, he moved to Portuguese club Porto for just over £10 million in 2021.

Grujić is a former Serbian youth international, and represented Serbia at every youth level from under-16 upwards. He was part of the side which won the 2015 U-20 World Cup. He made his full international debut for Serbia in May 2016, and was later included in the squad for two FIFA World Cups (2018 and 2022).

== Club career ==
=== Red Star Belgrade ===
Grujić was born in Belgrade, FR Yugoslavia (now Serbia) and is a product of Red Star Belgrade, where he went through the youth program, passed all categories and was the captain of his generation. He made his professional debut for Red Star on 26 May 2013, in a Serbian SuperLiga match versus Vojvodina.

On 17 May 2015, Grujić signed a three-year contract with Red Star to last until 2018. Grujić scored his first senior goal on 26 September against Novi Pazar in a 2–0 victory; he also assisted Aleksandar Katai for the second goal. Grujić was a part of an unprecedented run of Red Star victories, as the club set a new record for the number of consecutive victories (19), ending the first half of the season without defeat.

=== Liverpool ===
Throughout autumn, Grujić was scouted by a number of high-profile European teams, including Liverpool, Internazionale, Juventus, Chelsea, and Milan. Liverpool manager Jürgen Klopp called Grujić personally to convince him to switch to Anfield, but initially Grujić's father was against his son moving to Liverpool. Klopp's assistant, Željko Buvač, flew to Belgrade to speak with Grujić and on 6 January 2016, it was confirmed that Grujić completed his move to Premier League side Liverpool, signing a five-year deal for a reported fee of £5.1 million. Upon joining, Grujić hailed Klopp for convincing him to join and told the press, "I would choose Liverpool over Real Madrid and Barcelona."

He was immediately loaned back to Red Star until the end of the season for a fee of £740,000, and won the SuperLiga with Red Star while on loan. Grujić finished the season with 29 appearances, 6 goals, 7 assists and was voted into the SuperLiga Team of the Year for his contribution to Red Star's unbeaten season.

On 20 August 2016, Grujić made his Premier League debut for Liverpool in a 2–0 loss against Burnley, coming on as a substitute for Adam Lallana in the 78th minute.

==== Loan to Cardiff City ====
On 17 January 2018, Grujić joined Championship side Cardiff City on loan for the remainder of the 2017–18 season. He made his debut for the club three days later, playing in a 0–0 draw with Sheffield Wednesday. Grujić's first goal for Cardiff came in a 2–1 home victory over Barnsley on 6 March, scoring from range just after the start of the second half.

==== Loan to Hertha BSC ====
On 19 August 2018, Grujić joined Bundesliga club Hertha BSC on a one-year loan. He scored his first goal for the club on 8 December, netting the only goal in a 1–0 win over Eintracht Frankfurt. Hertha coach Pal Dardai hailed Grujić as "by far the best midfielder at Hertha Berlin in 20 years".

On 1 July 2019, Grujić's loan deal was extended for a second season, with a reported loan fee of £2 million.

==== Return to Liverpool ====
On 25 September 2020, Grujić started in Liverpool's EFL Cup tie against Lincoln, winning 7–2 and scoring a goal.

=== Porto ===
On 6 October 2020, Grujić joined Portuguese club Porto on a season-long loan. On 20 July 2021, Porto made his deal permanent for a transfer worth £10,5 million and a 10% sell-on clause.

=== AEK Athens ===
On 2 September 2025, Grujić moved to Super League Greece club AEK Athens. He was part of the team which achieved the league title in the 2025–26 season.

=== Levski Sofia ===
On 15 August 2026, Grujić signed with Bulgarian First League club Levski Sofia on a one-year contract, with an option for an additional year.

== International career ==
Grujić represented Serbia at all youth levels from under-16 to under-21, and was a member of the Serbia squad that won the 2015 FIFA U-20 World Cup in New Zealand.

In May 2016, Grujić made his full international debut for the Serbia national team after coming on in place of Nemanja Matić in a 2–1 win against Cyprus.

In June 2018, Grujić was selected in Serbia's squad for the 2018 World Cup, but he failed to make any appearances in the competition.

In November 2022, Grujić was selected in Serbia's squad for the 2022 FIFA World Cup in Qatar. He played in a group stage match against Cameroon. Serbia finished fourth in the group, ending their campaign early.

== Style of play ==
Standing at 6-foot-3-inches (1.91 m), Grujić has been described as "tall, rangy, comfortable on the ball and with a good range of passing" and dubbed the "new Matić" because of his likeness in both appearance and position to fellow defensive midfielder and compatriot Nemanja Matić.

== Career statistics ==
=== Club ===
As of match played 8 February 2026

Appearances and goals by club, season and competition
Club	Season	League			National cup (Note: Includes Serbian Cup, FA Cup, DFB-Pokal, Taça de Portugal)		League cup (Note: Includes EFL Cup, Taça da Liga)		Continental		Other		Total	
Club	Season	Division	Apps	Goals	Apps	Goals	Apps	Goals	Apps	Goals	Apps	Goals	Apps	Goals
Red Star Belgrade	2012–13	Serbian SuperLiga	1	0	0	0	—		0	0	—		1	0
Red Star Belgrade	2014–15	Serbian SuperLiga	9	0	1	0	—		0	0	—		10	0
Red Star Belgrade	2015–16	Serbian SuperLiga	29	6	1	0	—		0	0	—		30	6
Red Star Belgrade	Total		39	6	2	0	—		0	0	—		41	6
Kolubara (loan)	2014–15	Serbian First League	5	2	0	0	—		—		—		5	2
Liverpool	2016–17	Premier League	5	0	0	0	3	0	0	0	—		8	0
Liverpool	2017–18	Premier League	3	0	0	0	1	0	2 (Note: Appearances in UEFA Champions League)	0	—		6	0
Liverpool	2020–21	Premier League	0	0	0	0	2	1	0	0	0	0	2	1
Liverpool	Total		8	0	0	0	6	1	2	0	0	0	16	1
Cardiff City (loan)	2017–18	Championship	13	1	1	0	0	0	—		—		14	1
Hertha BSC (loan)	2018–19	Bundesliga	22	5	1	0	—		—		—		23	5
Hertha BSC (loan)	2019–20	Bundesliga	29	4	2	0	—		—		—		31	4
Hertha BSC (loan)	Total		51	9	3	0	—		—		—		54	9
Porto (loan)	2020–21	Primeira Liga	23	2	5	0	2	0	8	0	1 (Note: Appearance in Supertaça Cândido de Oliveira)	0	39	2
Porto	2021–22	Primeira Liga	21	1	5	0	1	0	9 (Note: Six appearances in UEFA Champions League, three appearances in UEFA Europa League)	0	—		36	1
Porto	2022–23	Primeira Liga	24	1	7	0	3	0	4	0	1	0	39	1
Porto	2023–24	Primeira Liga	10	0	5	0	2	0	3	0	1	0	21	0
Porto	2024–25	Primeira Liga	2	0	0	0	0	0	2	0	1	0	5	0
Porto	Total		57	2	17	0	6	0	18	0	3	0	101	2
AEK Athens	2025–26	Super League Greece	10	1	4	0	—		5	0	—		19	1
AEK Athens	Total		10	1	4	0	—		5	0	—		19	1
Career total			206	23	32	0	14	1	33	0	4	0	289	24

=== International ===
As of match played 16 November 2025

Appearances and goals by national team and year
National team	Year	Apps	Goals
Serbia	2016	3	0
Serbia	2017	1	0
Serbia	2018	4	0
Serbia	2019	0	0
Serbia	2020	1	0
Serbia	2021	5	0
Serbia	2022	5	0
Serbia	2023	5	0
Serbia	2024	4	0
Serbia	2025	2	0
Total		30	0

== Honours ==
Red Star Belgrade

- Serbian SuperLiga: 2015–16

Porto

- Primeira Liga: 2021–22
- Taça de Portugal: 2021–22, 2022–23, 2023–24
- Taça da Liga: 2022–23
- Supertaça Cândido de Oliveira: 2020, 2022, 2024

AEK Athens

- Super League Greece: 2025–26

Serbia U20

- FIFA U-20 World Cup: 2015

Individual

- Serbian SuperLiga Team of the Season: 2015–16
