= Diogo Costa =

Portuguese footballer (born 1999)

Diogo Costa ComM
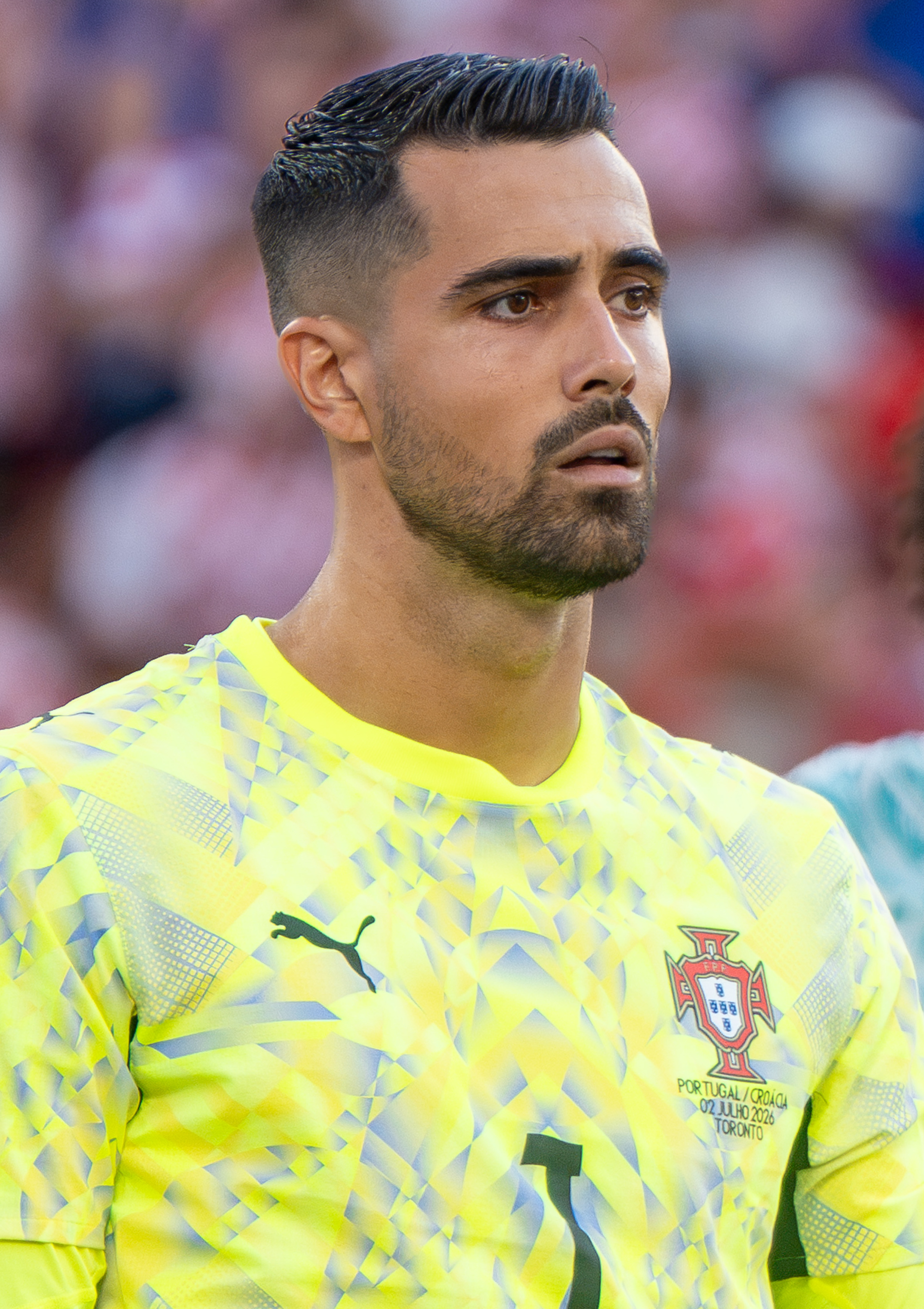
- Costa with Portugal in 2026

Personal information
- Full name: Diogo Meireles da Costa
- Date of birth: 19 September 1999 (age 27)
- Place of birth: Rothrist, Switzerland
- Height: 1.86 m (6 ft 1 in)
- Position: Goalkeeper

Team information
- Current team: Porto
- Number: 99

Youth career
- 2008–2009: AMCH Ringe
- 2009–2011: CB Póvoa Lanhoso
- 2011–2019: Porto

Senior career*
Years	Team	Apps	(Gls)
2017–2021	Porto B	51	(0)
2019–	Porto	179	(0)

International career^{‡}
2014	Portugal U15	1	(0)
2014–2015	Portugal U16	4	(0)
2015–2016	Portugal U17	14	(0)
2015	Portugal U18	2	(0)
2016–2018	Portugal U19	19	(0)
2017–2019	Portugal U20	10	(0)
2018–2021	Portugal U21	16	(0)
2021–	Portugal	54	(0)
Medal record
Men's football
Representing Portugal
UEFA Nations League
Winner	2025 Germany	Team
UEFA European U21 Championship
Runner-up	2021 Hungary–Slovenia
UEFA European U19 Championship
Winner	2018 Finland
Runner-up	2017 Georgia
UEFA European U17 Championship
Winner	2016 Azerbaijan
- * Club domestic league appearances and goals as of 23:17, 8 November 2026 (UTC) ‡ National team caps and goals as of 22:55, 17 November 2026 (UTC)

Diogo Meireles da Costa ComM (European Portuguese pronunciation: [diˈoɣu ˈkɔʃtɐ]; born 19 September 1999) is a Portuguese professional footballer who plays as a goalkeeper for Primeira Liga club Porto, which he captains, and the Portugal national team.

Coming through Porto's youth system, Costa won the UEFA Youth League in 2019. He was promoted from the reserve side to the first-team in 2019, winning a domestic double of the Primeira Liga and the Taça de Portugal in his first season. He broke into the starting line-up in 2021, aged 22, helping Porto to a second domestic double. After Pepe's retirement in July 2024, he took up the role of captain, guiding Porto to another league title in 2025–26. In total with Porto, Costa has won three Primeira Liga titles, four Taças de Portugal, one Taça da Liga, and holds the league record for most clean sheets in a single season, with 21 in the 2025–26 campaign.

Costa represented Portugal at various youth levels, being part of the under-17 team that won the 2016 European Championship, the under-19 team that won the 2018 European Championship and the under-21 team that finished as runners-up at the 2021 European Championship. He made his senior international debut in 2021, and subsequently became first-choice goalkeeper, replacing Portugal's long-term option Rui Patrício. Over the following years, he represented Portugal at the 2022 FIFA World Cup, UEFA Euro 2024 and the 2026 World Cup. He also won the UEFA Nations League in 2025.

== Club career ==
=== Early career ===
Born in Rothrist, Canton of Aargau, Switzerland to Portuguese parents, Costa relocated to Santo Tirso in Portugal at the age of 7. In his childhood, he played football with his cousin Vitor, with their idol being Porto legend Vítor Baía, whom they looked to emulate. He started playing football at a local academy, AMCH Ringe, and later began going through some training sessions with Benfica, being integrated into one of their feeder club, Póvoa de Lanhoso, where he stayed for two years, standing out alongside future teammate Vitinha, before joining Porto's academy in 2011, following the consent of his parents.

=== Porto ===
==== 2017–2021: Youth career and reserves ====
Costa made his senior debut with the reserve team on 6 August 2017, in a 1–2 home loss against Gil Vicente for the LigaPro. He finished the season with a further 31 appearances, helping to a seventh-place finish, and on 15 May he renewed his contract until June 2022. In September, he was named the club's Newcomer of the Year; late in the same year, Spanish goalkeeper Iker Casillas – who started for the first team – heaped praise upon him, regarding him as his "successor".

Costa won the 2018–19 UEFA Youth League with Porto, defeating Chelsea 3–1 in the final in Nyon, Switzerland on 29 April. Days later, after Casillas suffered a heart attack, Vaná replaced him as starting goalkeeper and Costa was called up to the bench for the final three games of the season, starting with a 4–0 win at Aves on 4 May.

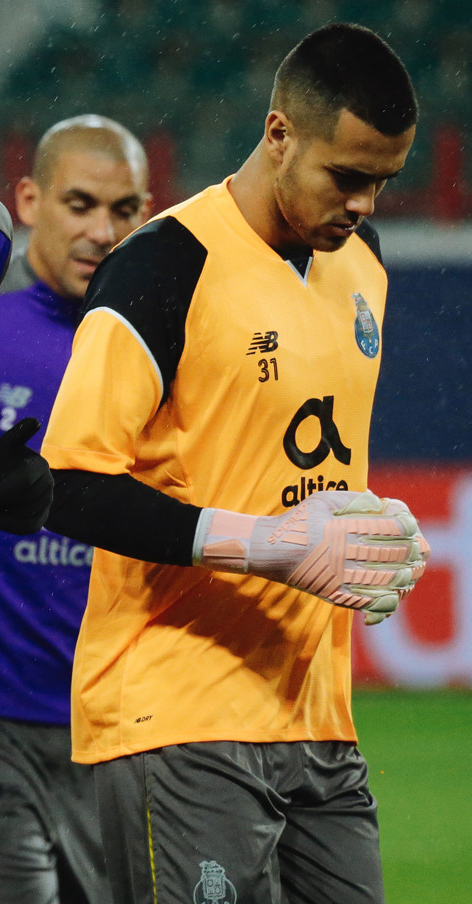
Costa training with Porto in 2018

On 25 September 2019, Costa made his first-team debut in the opening group match of the Taça da Liga, keeping a clean sheet in a 1–0 home victory over Santa Clara. His first Primeira Liga appearance took place on 10 November in a 1–0 away defeat of Boavista, as the habitual starter Agustín Marchesín was suspended internally after a breach of discipline. He made a further two until the end of the campaign for the eventual champions, as well as all seven Taça de Portugal matches as they secured the double.

At the start of the 2020–21 season, Costa inherited Porto's 99 shirt, made famous by goalkeeper and club legend Vítor Baía. He remained Marchesín's backup, only appearing in one league game, and made his Champions League debut on 9 December 2020; he kept a clean sheet in a 2–0 group stage win at Olympiacos.

==== 2021–2023: First-choice goalkeeper and second league title ====
At the start of the 2021–22 season, Costa had a run as first-choice goalkeeper when Marchesín was sidelined with an injury. He was September 2021's Goalkeeper of the Month, receiving 25% of the votes while Benfica's Odysseas Vlachodimos received 22%. On 16 October, he agreed to a contract extension to 2026, increasing his buyout clause from €30 million to €60 million. After helping Porto to an unbeaten run of sixteen consecutive league games, during which he kept eight clean sheets, he was named the league's Goalkeeper of the Month for four consecutive months from December to March 2022.

He would then be part of five more victories that would seal Porto a second domestic double of the Primeira Liga and the Taça de Portugal, after keeping a clean sheet in the 1–0 victory of O Clássico against rivals Benfica on 7 May, and 15 days later Porto 3–1 defeating Tondela in the domestic cup final. Despite finishing the season with 15 clean sheets, the second-highest total behind Antonio Adán of Sporting CP, Costa was still named in the Primeira Liga Team of the Year ahead of him. He also named the Primeira Liga Goalkeeper of the Year, having started in 33 of 34 Porto's league matches of the season, having missed only their last match, with the title being already secured.

On 4 October, Costa managed to save a penalty from Patrik Schick, and preserved a clean sheet in a 2–0 home win over Bayer Leverkusen in a Champions League group stage match. In the reverse fixture against them, on 12 October, Costa managed to provide an assist to a goal from Galeno, then saved a penalty from Kerem Demirbay, and preserved a clean sheet in a 3–0 away win against Leverkusen in Germany, becoming the first goalkeeper to achieve that feat in the Champions League. On 26 October, Costa saved another penalty from Noa Lang, as Porto's went on to win the game 4–0 away against Club Brugge, becoming the first goalkeeper to save three consecutive penalties in the competition's history. His form throughout the club's Champions League group stage campaign, saw him help his side qualify to the round of sixteen, as group winners, following a 2–1 home win over Atlético Madrid on 1 November, amassing 43 saves, and a man of the match award, during the group stage.

On 28 January 2023, Costa kept a clean sheet in the 2–0 final win over Sporting CP, helping Porto win their first Taça da Liga in Leiria. On 22 February, in the first leg of Champions League round-of-16, Costa proved to crucial for Porto, making several crucial saves as they lost 1–0 away in the first leg, to eventual tournament runners-up Inter Milan. On 14 March, in the second leg, despite keeping a clean sheet at home, in his 100th appearance for Porto, producing several decisive saves, a 0–0 draw prevented them from advancing to the quarter-finals. On 4 June, his team won the 2023 Taça de Portugal final 2–0 against Braga, with Costa keeping another clean sheet. In the league, Porto finished as runners-up, with Costa reaching 16 clean sheets goals in 33 games, contributing decisively for the club's second-best defensive record in the competition, being named for the second consecutive season the Primeira Liga Goalkeeper of the Year.

==== 2023–Present: Club captain and individual accolades ====
Over the course of the 2023 summer transfer window, there was much speculation that Costa would leave Porto with Chelsea, and Manchester United linked with the player. Porto were adamant he would not be sold for less than his €75 million release clause, leading both clubs to pull out of the deal, due to the overall cost of the transfer with United signing André Onana instead. He was also linked to a move to Bayern Munich and Real Madrid, following an injury to their starting goalkeepers, but a move never materialised, and he ended up staying at Porto for the upcoming season.

In 2022, he became the first goal-keeper to save a penalty and make an assist in the same Champions League game, proving himself to be a worthy heir to the coveted 99 shirt.

In the 2023–24 season, despite a third-place finish from Porto in the Primeira Liga, he ended the season with 14 clean sheets out of 34 league matches, the highest in the season. Costa also featured in the entirety of Porto's Taça de Portugal final victory over Sporting CP on 26 May, which ended 2–1. Shortly after, he was linked with a move to Saudi Arabia, with three clubs in the Saudi Pro League interested in him, as well as Manchester City as potencial replacement for Ederson, who was linked to a move to Saudi Pro League side Al-Ittihad. However, on 2 July, Porto's President André Villas-Boas confirmed that the club was not willing to sell him, as he was "one of their biggest assets".

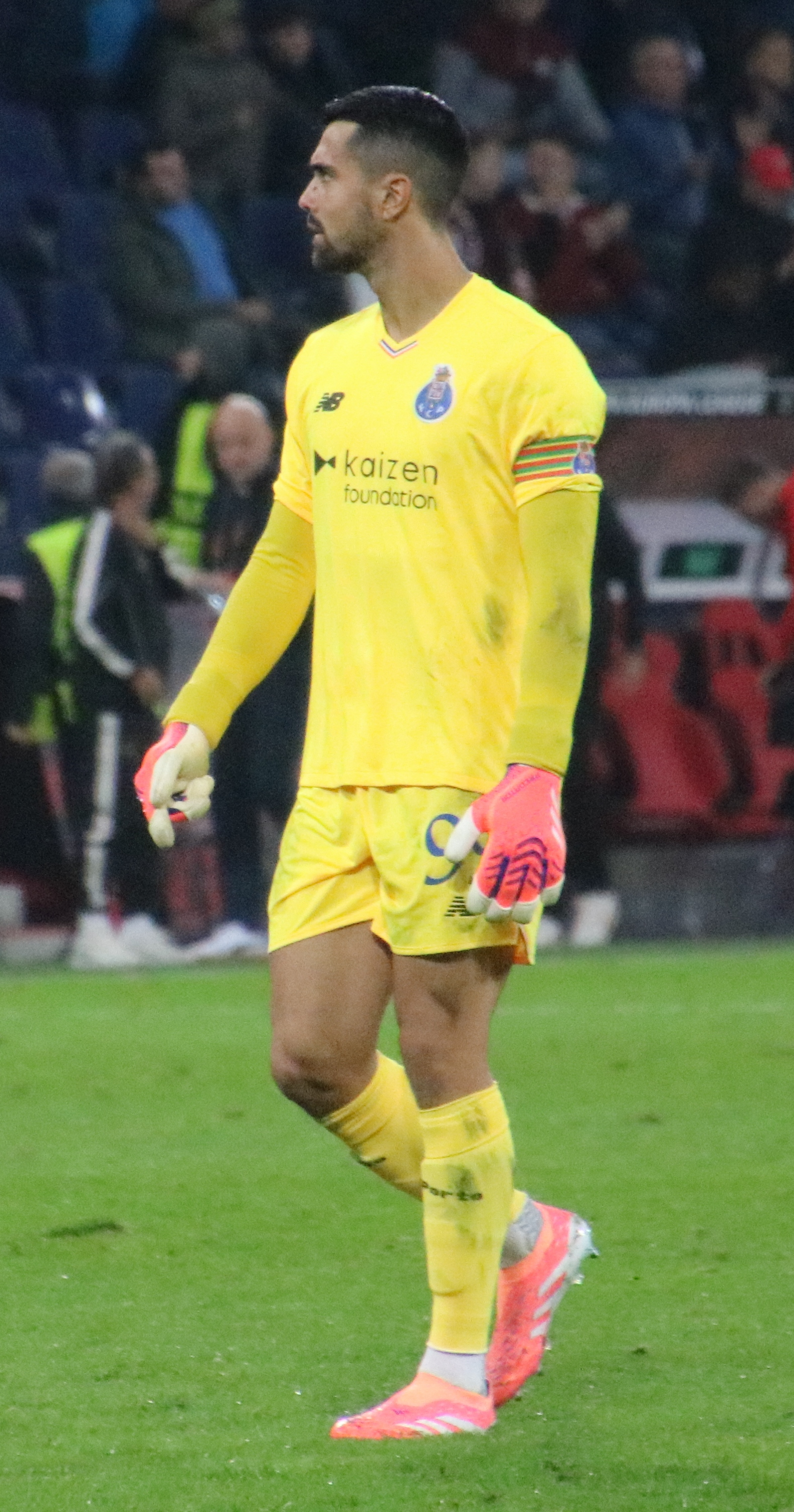
Costa with Porto during the 2025–26 season

On 12 July, it was announced that Costa would become the new club captain following Pepe's retirement and Iván Marcano long-term injury, with new vice-captains being Cláudio Ramos and Fábio Cardoso. On 3 August, he captained his side in the first competitive match of the season as Porto won the 2024 Supertaça Cândido de Oliveira by defeating Sporting CP with a 4–3 victory, despite being down by three goals. On 29 September, in a 4–0 league win against Arouca, Costa kept his 100th career clean sheet, at age of 25, in his 161st appearance for the club. Despite a difficult start to the season for Porto defensively, after keeping three clean sheets in five league matches, he was named the Primeira Liga's Goalkeeper of the Month for September and October. He would finish the season with the most clean sheets in the league at 16, despite Porto finishing third in the Primeira Liga. His performances saw him being named the league's Goalkeeper of the Season, and saw Costa being included in the season's best XI.

During the final days of the 2025 summer transfer window, Aston Villa considered signing Costa as a potential replacement of Emiliano Martínez. Despite Costa not being keen on the move, the transfer collapsed due Martínez remaining at Villa, after failing to secure a move to Manchester United. On 23 December, Costa extended his contract with Porto until June 2030, which saw his release clause decrease to €60 million.

On 2 May 2026, Costa guided Porto to the league title — his third with the club — keeping a clean sheet in a 1–0 win against Alverca, bringing his tally to 26 clean sheets for the campaign. That clean sheet broke the club record for the most clean sheets in a single season in the 21st century — which was previously set at 25, by both Sergei Ovchinnikov in the 2000–01 season and Helton in the 2012–13 season. On 16 May, he broke the record for the most clean sheets in a Primeira Liga season with 21, after a 1–0 home win over Santa Clara in Porto's last league match of the season. He also extended the club's record of 27 clean sheets in all competitions and kept the most clean sheets of any goalkeeper in a Primeira Liga season for the third consecutive season. This led to him being named the league's Goalkeeper of the Year and best XI for the second consecutive season.

== International career ==
=== Youth ===
Costa started all of Portugal's matches in the 2016 UEFA European Under-17 Championship. In the final against Spain, he saved Manu Morlanes' spot kick in a 5–4 penalty shoot-out victory after a 1–1 draw, helping his team win the tournament for the sixth time. With the under-19s, he participated in the 2017 European Championship, playing four out of five matches as they lost in the final to England. He represented the nation at the 2017 FIFA U-20 World Cup, starting in all the matches in a quarter-final exit.

In July 2018, Costa played four matches out of five at the UEFA European Under-19 Championship in Finland, helping Portugal win the tournament for the first time, but missed the final due to a muscle injury. Previously, on 25 May, the 18-year-old won his first cap for the under-21 side, coming on as a second-half substitute in a 3–2 friendly win over Italy. In March 2021, Costa played all of Portugal's matches in the 2021 UEFA European Under-21 Championship, as Portugal finished the tournament as runners-up, losing the final 1–0 to Germany.

=== Senior ===
Costa was called up to the senior team for the first time on 26 August 2021, for 2022 FIFA World Cup qualifiers against the Republic of Ireland and Azerbaijan and a friendly with Qatar. He made his debut on 9 October against the last of those opponents, in a 3–0 victory at Algarve Stadium. Costa was chosen as the first-choice goalkeeper by the head coach Fernando Santos for the 2022 FIFA World Cup qualification play-offs, relegating usual starter Rui Patrício to the bench. On 24 March, at his club ground, he played his first competitive game in a 3–1 win over Turkey in the play-off semi-finals; he featured again five days later in a 2–0 victory over North Macedonia that sealed a place for the tournament.

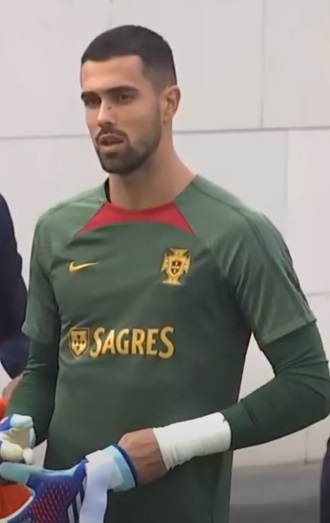
Costa training with Portugal in 2023

Costa was called up for the final 26-man squad for the 2022 FIFA World Cup in Qatar. On 25 November, he played his first World Cup match, a 3–2 group stage win against Ghana. This made him the youngest Portuguese goalkeeper to play in a major international tournament, at age 23. However, Costa had a difficult game, nearly costing his team's match in injury time. While setting the ball down on the pitch, Costa prepared to kick the ball out of the box, but he did not know that Ghana striker Iñaki Williams was lurking behind him, as Williams proceeded to charge forward and steal the ball, he ended up slipping while being challenged by Costa, leading Portugal's defence to clear the ball and seal the victory. He still played every minute of the campaign, as they were knocked out of the tournament after losing in the quarter-finals to Morocco, where he misjudged a cross when coming for the ball, and Youssef En-Nesyri headed the only goal of the game.

Despite a difficult World Cup, Costa retained his place under new manager Roberto Martínez, on the UEFA Euro 2024 qualifiers, helping Portugal keep a clean sheet in the 9–0 home defeat of Luxembourg during the same phase on 11 September 2023, their biggest win in international history. He finished the qualifying campaign, keeping nine clean sheets out of ten matches, only conceding two goals against Slovakia in a 3–2 home win on 13 October, with Portugal topping their qualifying group, and setting a new national team record of 10 consecutive wins. On 21 May 2024, he was selected in the 26-man squad for the UEFA Euro 2024. In the round of 16 match against Slovenia, he was awarded player of the match, as he cleared a one-to-one chance from Benjamin Šeško in the extra time, before saving all three penalties in the shootout, becoming the first ever goalkeeper in the European Championship to do so, securing his country's qualification to the quarter-finals. Costa recalled the match by saying it was "the best match of my life, the match in which I managed to help my team the most. I had to follow my instinct, that's what I felt. I'm very happy and very excited to help the team so much". Portugal were eliminated in the quarter-finals to France after losing 5–3 in another penalty shootout, with Costa failing to save any penalty.

On 20 May 2025, Costa was selected for Portugal's 2025 UEFA Nations League Finals squad. He and his team would go on to win the tournament 5–3 in a penalty shootout over rivals Spain, in which he had a crucial role by saving a penalty from Álvaro Morata.

Costa with Portugal at the 2026 FIFA World Cup

On 19 May 2026, he was selected in the 26-man squad for the 2026 FIFA World Cup. On 28 June, Costa kept a clean sheet and earned Man of the Match award in a 0–0 draw against Colombia in Portugal's last group stage match.

== Style of play ==
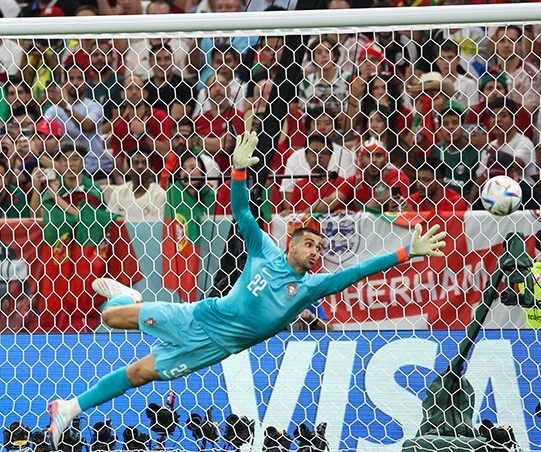
Costa making a save during a 2022 FIFA World Cup group stage match against Uruguay, which Portugal won 2–0

Described as a "sweeper-keeper" because of his playing style, Costa is a goalkeeper distinguished by his technical skills and tactical intelligence. He possesses exceptional reflexes and reaction times, enabling him to execute difficult saves in one-on-one situations and against point-blank shots. Costa also excels in penalty situations, displaying composure and a strong sense of positioning. His effectiveness in collecting crosses further highlights his decision-making abilities and overall goalkeeping prowess.

Tactically, Costa is a goalkeeper who is comfortable with the ball at his feet, facilitating play from the back and aiding in ball distribution. His precise short and long passes help initiate attacks and maintain possession for his team. Additionally, Costa has strong game awareness and positioning, allowing him to anticipate plays and effectively intercept crosses and aerial threats. His leadership qualities are evident on the field; he communicates well with his defensive teammates, showcasing maturity and confidence in organizing the defensive line to ensure team compactness. Pedro Pereira, a goalkeeping coach who worked with Costa in Porto's youth system and B team, described him as "a very calm goalkeeper, one with real presence", and stated that "he has clarity in key moments and controls his emotions very well. He exudes security in everything he does, and that transmits a sense of serenity to the team."

== Personal life ==
Together with his wife Catarina Machado, they have a son born in November 2022, named Tomás Costa.

== Career statistics ==
=== Club ===
As of match played 8 November 2026

Appearances and goals by club, season and competition
Club	Season	League			Taça de Portugal		Taça da Liga		Europe		Other		Total	
Club	Season	Division	Apps	Goals	Apps	Goals	Apps	Goals	Apps	Goals	Apps	Goals	Apps	Goals
Porto B	2017–18	LigaPro	32	0	—		—		—		—		34	0
Porto B	2018–19	LigaPro	17	0	—		—		—		—		18	0
Porto B	2020–21	Liga Portugal 2	2	0	—		—		—		—		2	0
Porto B	Total		51	0	—		—		—		—		51	0
Porto	2019–20	Primeira Liga	3	0	7	0	5	0	0	0	—		15	0
Porto	2020–21	Primeira Liga	1	0	6	0	2	0	1 (Note: Appearance(s) in UEFA Champions League)	0	0	0	10	0
Porto	2021–22	Primeira Liga	33	0	0	0	0	0	10 (Note: Six appearances in UEFA Champions League, four appearances in UEFA Europa League)	0	—		43	0
Porto	2022–23	Primeira Liga	33	0	0	0	0	0	8	0	0	0	41	0
Porto	2023–24	Primeira Liga	33	0	3	0	0	0	8	0	1 (Note: Appearance in Supertaça Cândido de Oliveira)	0	45	0
Porto	2024–25	Primeira Liga	32	0	0	0	0	0	10 (Note: Appearances in UEFA Europa League)	0	1	0	43	0
Porto	2025–26	Primeira Liga	33	0	4	0	0	0	12	0	—		49	0
Porto	2026–27	Primeira Liga	11	0	0	0	0	0	4	0	1	0	16	0
Porto	Total		179	0	20	0	7	0	53	0	3	0	262	0
Career total			230	0	20	0	7	0	53	0	3	0	313	0

=== International ===
As of match played 17 November 2026

Appearances and goals by national team and year
National team	Year	Apps	Goals
Portugal	2021	1	0
Portugal	2022	11	0
Portugal	2023	7	0
Portugal	2024	13	0
Portugal	2025	10	0
Portugal	2026	12	0
Total		54	0

== Honours ==
Porto Youth

- UEFA Youth League: 2018–19

Porto

- Primeira Liga: 2019–20, 2021–22, 2025–26
- Taça de Portugal: 2019–20, 2021–22, 2022–23, 2023–24
- Taça da Liga: 2022–23
- Supertaça Cândido de Oliveira: 2020, 2024, 2026

Portugal U17

- UEFA European Under-17 Championship: 2016

Portugal U19

- UEFA European Under-19 Championship: 2018; runner-up: 2017

Portugal U21

- UEFA European Under-21 Championship runner-up: 2021

Portugal

- UEFA Nations League: 2024–25

Individual

- Primeira Liga Goalkeeper of the Year: 2021–22, 2022–23, 2024–25, 2025–26
- Primeira Liga Team of the Year: 2021–22, 2022–23, 2024–25, 2025–26
- UEFA European Under-17 Championship Team of the Tournament: 2016
- UEFA European Under-19 Championship Team of the Tournament: 2017
- UEFA European Under-21 Championship Team of the Tournament: 2021
- Dragão de Ouro – Newcomer Athlete of the Year: 2018
- Primeira Liga Goalkeeper of the Month: January 2024, September/October 2024, December 2025, April 2026, August 2026

Orders

- Medal of the Order of Merit
