= 2020 Supertaça Cândido de Oliveira =

Supertaça Cândido de Oliveira Vodafone
- Event: Supertaça Cândido de Oliveira (Portuguese Super Cup)
Porto	Benfica
2	0
- Date: 23 December 2020
- Venue: Estádio Municipal de Aveiro
- Man of the Match: Sérgio Oliveira (Porto)
- Referee: Hugo Miguel
- Attendance: 0 (Note: The match was played behind closed doors due to the COVID-19 pandemic in Portugal.)

The 2020 Supertaça Cândido de Oliveira was the 42nd edition of the Supertaça Cândido de Oliveira. It was played between the champions of the 2019–20 Primeira Liga and winners of the 2019–20 Taça de Portugal, Porto, and the runners-up of the Taça de Portugal, Benfica, on 23 December 2020. Porto won the match 2–0 to secure their second Supertaça title in three years and extend their record to 22 titles overall.

== Effects of the COVID-19 pandemic ==
Due to the COVID-19 pandemic in Portugal, the FPF, Porto and Benfica announced on 1 July 2020 that this season's Supertaça would be suspended, providing a clearer schedule at the start of the season. A month later, on 5 August, the date of 23 December was decided for the match.

== Venue ==
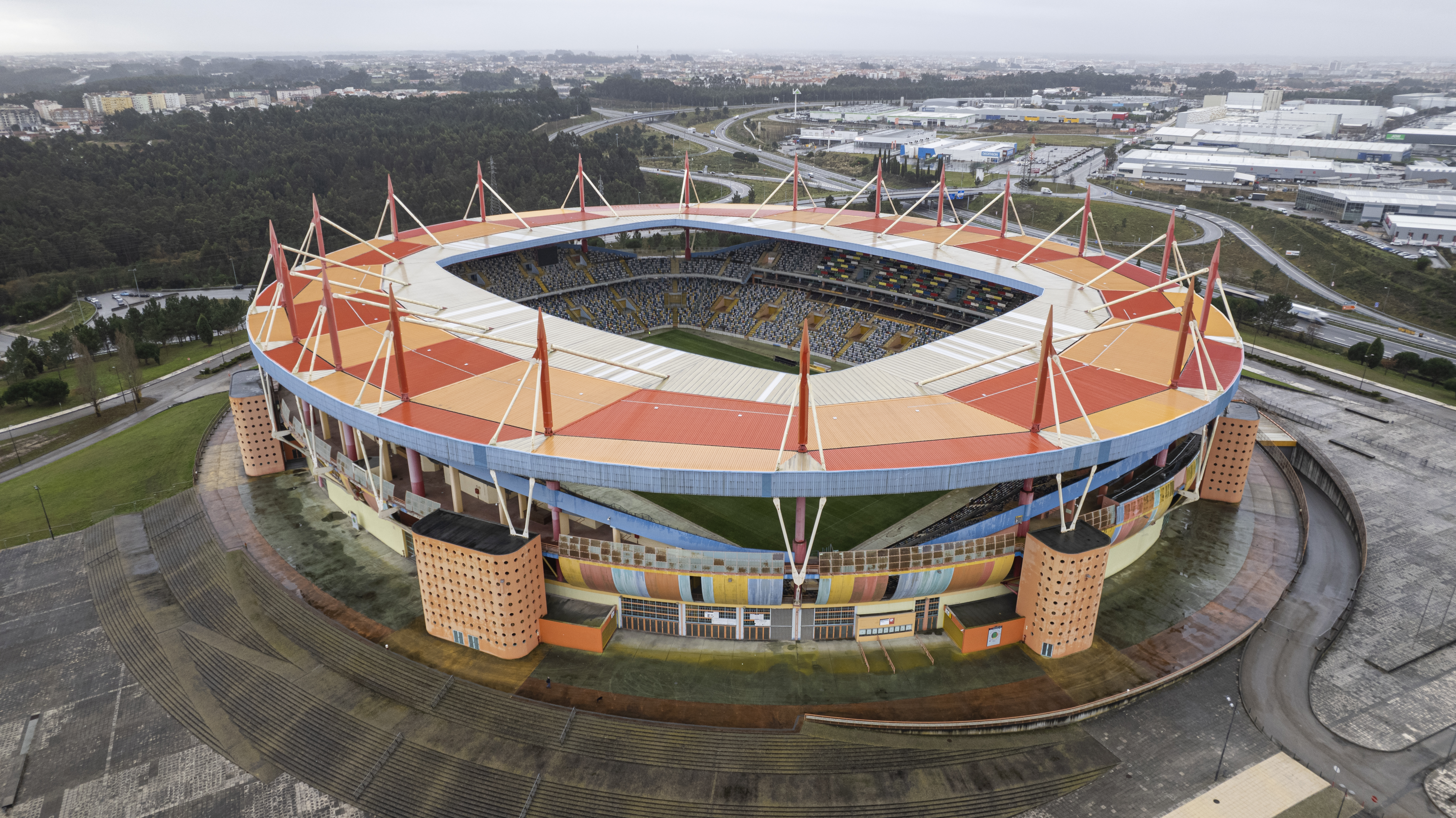
Estádio Municipal de Aveiro

The Portuguese Football Federation announced on 16 October 2020 that the Estádio Municipal de Aveiro would host this season's Supertaça in December, as well as the postponed finals from the previous season's Taça de Portugal Feminina and Taça da Liga Feminina. This was the tenth time the Supertaça was played at the Estádio Municipal de Aveiro, having hosted all Supertaça matches but two since 2009, both of them played at Estádio Algarve, in 2015 and 2019.

== Match ==
=== Details ===
23 December 2020
20:45 WET (UTC+00:00)

Porto	2–0	Benfica
Oliveira 25' (pen.); Díaz 90'	Report

Estádio Municipal de Aveiro, Aveiro
Attendance: 0
Referee: Hugo Miguel

Porto	Benfica

GK	1	(Argentina) Agustín Marchesín
RB	18	(Portugal) Wilson Manafá
CB	19	(Democratic Republic of the Congo) Chancel Mbemba	(yellow card) 57'	(substituted off) 76'
CB	3	(Portugal) Pepe (c)	(yellow card) 36'
LB	12	(Nigeria) Zaidu Sanusi
RM	17	(Mexico) Jesús Corona		(substituted off) 90+4'
CM	27	(Portugal) Sérgio Oliveira	(yellow card) 53'	(substituted off) 89'
CM	8	(Colombia) Mateus Uribe
LM	25	(Brazil) Otávio
CF	11	(Mali) Moussa Marega		(substituted off) 89'
CF	9	(Iran) Mehdi Taremi		(substituted off) 77'
Substitutes:
GK	99	(Portugal) Diogo Costa
DF	4	(Portugal) Diogo Leite		(substituted on) 76'
MF	16	(Serbia) Marko Grujić		(substituted on) 89'
MF	21	(Portugal) Romário Baró		(substituted on) 90+4'
FW	7	(Colombia) Luis Díaz		(substituted on) 77'
FW	23	(Portugal) João Mário
FW	29	(Spain) Toni Martínez		(substituted on) 89'
Manager:
(Portugal) Sérgio Conceição

GK	99	(Greece) Odysseas Vlachodimos
RB	2	(Brazil) Gilberto		(substituted off) 89'
CB	30	(Argentina) Nicolás Otamendi (c)
CB	5	(Belgium) Jan Vertonghen
LB	3	(Spain) Álex Grimaldo		(substituted off) 89'
RM	27	(Portugal) Rafa Silva		(substituted off) 64'
CM	28	(Germany) Julian Weigl	(yellow card) 30'	(substituted off) 89'
CM	49	(Morocco) Adel Taarabt
LM	7	(Brazil) Everton
CF	10	(Germany) Luca Waldschmidt
CF	9	(Uruguay) Darwin Núñez
Substitutes:
GK	77	(Brazil) Helton Leite
DF	33	(Brazil) Jardel
DF	71	(Portugal) Nuno Tavares		(substituted on) 89'
MF	17	(Portugal) Diogo Gonçalves		(substituted on) 89'
MF	22	(Greece) Andreas Samaris
MF	38	(Brazil) Pedrinho		(substituted on) 89'
FW	14	(Switzerland) Haris Seferovic	(yellow card) 90+3'	(substituted on) 64'
Manager:
(Portugal) Jorge Jesus

Man of the Match:
(Portugal) Sérgio Oliveira (Porto)

Assistant referees:
Pedro Martins
Ricardo Santos
Fourth official:
Rui Costa
Video assistant referee:
Bruno Esteves
Assistant video assistant referee:
André Campos

Match rules

- 90 minutes.
- Penalty shoot-out if scores still level.
- Seven named substitutes, of which up to five may be used during regular time.

== See also ==
- O Clássico
- 2020–21 Primeira Liga
- 2020–21 Taça de Portugal
- 2020–21 Taça da Liga
- 2020–21 FC Porto season
- 2020–21 S.L. Benfica season
