= João Mário (footballer, born 2000) =

Portuguese footballer

Personal information
- Full name: João Mário Neto Lopes
- Date of birth: 3 January 2000 (age 26)
- Place of birth: São João da Madeira, Portugal
- Height: 1.78 m (5 ft 10 in)
- Position: Right-back

Team information
- Current team: Fiorentina (on loan from Juventus)
- Number: 17

Youth career
- 2008–2009: Sanjoanense
- 2009–2019: Porto
- 2015–2016: → Padroense (loan)

Senior career*
Years	Team	Apps	(Gls)
2018–2021	Porto B	40	(5)
2020–2025	Porto	116	(5)
2025–	Juventus	10	(0)
2026	→ Bologna (loan)	10	(1)
2026–	→ Fiorentina (loan)	5	(1)

International career^{‡}
2018	Portugal U18	2	(0)
2018–2019	Portugal U19	19	(2)
2019	Portugal U20	6	(1)
2020–2022	Portugal U21	15	(1)
2023–	Portugal	3	(0)
Medal record
Men's football
Representing Portugal
UEFA European Under-19 Championship
Runner-up	2021 Hungary–Slovenia
UEFA European Under-19 Championship
Runner-up	2019 Armenia
- * Club domestic league appearances and goals as of 21:48, 29 October 2026 (UTC) ‡ National team caps and goals as of 21:46, 21 March 2024 (UTC)

João Mário Neto Lopes (born 3 January 2000), known as João Mário, is a Portuguese professional footballer who plays as a right-back for Serie A club Fiorentina, on loan from Juventus, and the Portugal national team.

He spent most of his career with Porto, scoring five goals in 181 appearances and winning several titles, including two Primeira Liga championships and four Taça de Portugal. In July 2025, he signed with Juventus for €12 million.

João Mário made his full international debut for Portugal in 2023.

== Club career ==
=== Porto ===
Born in São João da Madeira, Aveiro District, João Mário began at hometown club Sanjoanense before joining the ranks of Porto at the age of 9. On 7 October 2018, while still a junior, he made his professional debut with the reserve team in a LigaPro match against Arouca, coming on for Tiago Matos for the last 11 minutes of a 1–0 home loss. The following 5 January, he scored his first goal in a 2–2 draw with Benfica B also at the Estádio Dr. Jorge Sampaio.

On 10 June 2020, João Mário had his first call-up to Porto's first team, remaining unused as they won 1–0 at home to Marítimo. He debuted on 15 July as they won the Primeira Liga title with a 2–0 win over Sporting CP also at the Estádio do Dragão, playing the last five minutes in place of Luis Díaz. On 1 August, he was on the bench in the 2–1 defeat of Benfica in the final of the Taça de Portugal, securing a double.

João Mário was eventually reconverted by manager Sérgio Conceição into a right-back. He was later occasionally deployed again as winger, but struggled to provide assists from that position; he totalled 26 during his spell.

=== Juventus ===
On 24 July 2025, João Mário joined Serie A club Juventus on a five-year contract for a €12 million transfer fee. He made his league debut one month later, as a second-half substitute for Federico Gatti in the 2–0 home victory over Parma.

On 2 February 2026, João Mário was loaned to Bologna in the same league for the remainder of the season. He scored his first goal in Italy 24 days later, the only in a win against Brann in the knockout phase play-offs of the UEFA Europa League.

João Mário was loaned out again for 2026–27, to Fiorentina who retained an option to buy him at the end of the campaign.

== International career ==
João Mário won his first cap for Portugal at under-21 level on 4 September 2020. He scored in the 4–0 away victory against Cyprus for the 2021 UEFA European Championship qualifiers.

On 13 November 2023, João Mário was called up by the senior team for the first time, replacing Diogo Dalot (who withdrew for personal reasons) in the squad that would face Liechtenstein and Iceland in UEFA Euro 2024 qualifying matches. Three days later, he made his debut by replacing João Cancelo late into a 2–0 away win over the former. He made his first start on the 19th, in a 2–0 defeat of the latter at the Estádio José Alvalade.

== Career statistics ==
=== Club ===
As of match played 29 October 2026

Appearances and goals by club, season and competition
Club	Season	League			National cup (Note: Includes Taça de Portugal, Coppa Italia)		League cup (Note: Includes Taça da Liga)		Europe		Other		Total	
Club	Season	Division	Apps	Goals	Apps	Goals	Apps	Goals	Apps	Goals	Apps	Goals	Apps	Goals
Porto B	2018–19	Liga Portugal 2	18	4	—		—		—		—		18	4
Porto B	2019–20	Liga Portugal 2	18	0	—		—		—		—		18	0
Porto B	2020–21	Liga Portugal 2	4	1	—		—		—		—		4	1
Porto B	Total		40	5	—		—		—		—		40	5
Porto	2019–20	Primeira Liga	2	0	0	0	0	0	0	0	—		2	0
Porto	2020–21	Primeira Liga	14	2	3	0	2	0	2 (Note: Appearances in UEFA Champions League)	0	0	0	21	2
Porto	2021–22	Primeira Liga	28	0	3	0	0	0	8 (Note: Four appearances in UEFA Champions League, four appearances in UEFA Europa League)	0	—		39	0
Porto	2022–23	Primeira Liga	18	1	3	0	6	0	5	0	1 (Note: Appearance in Supertaça Cândido de Oliveira)	0	33	1
Porto	2023–24	Primeira Liga	27	2	7	0	1	0	8	0	1	0	44	2
Porto	2024–25	Primeira Liga	27	0	1	0	2	0	8 (Note: Appearances in UEFA Europa League)	0	4 (Note: One appearance in Supertaça Cândido de Oliveira, three appearances in FIFA Club World Cup)	0	42	0
Porto	Total		116	5	17	0	11	0	31	0	6	0	181	5
Juventus	2025–26	Serie A	10	0	1	0	—		2	0	—		13	0
Bologna (loan)	2025–26	Serie A	10	1	—		—		5	1	—		15	2
Fiorentina (loan)	2026–27	Serie A	5	1	2	0	—		—		—		7	1
Career total			181	12	20	0	11	0	38	1	6	0	256	13

=== International ===
As of match played 21 March 2024

Appearances and goals by national team and year
National team	Year	Apps	Goals
Portugal	2023	2	0
Portugal	2024	1	0
Total		3	0

== Honours ==
Porto Youth

- UEFA Youth League: 2018–19

Porto

- Primeira Liga: 2019–20, 2021–22
- Taça de Portugal: 2019–20, 2021–22, 2022–23, 2023–24
- Taça da Liga: 2022–23
- Supertaça Cândido de Oliveira: 2020, 2022, 2024
