= Mabrouk Rouaï =

French footballer (born 2000)

Personal information
- Full name: Mabrouk Haiça Rouaï
- Date of birth: 1 November 2000 (age 26)
- Place of birth: Marseille, France
- Height: 1.85 m (6 ft 1 in)
- Position: Midfielder

Team information
- Current team: Valenciennes
- Number: 8

Youth career
- 2005−2018: Air Bel
- 2018−2019: Nacional

Senior career*
Years	Team	Apps	(Gls)
2019−2022	Nacional	33	(1)
2022–2023	Estoril	2	(0)
2023–2024	Anadia	18	(0)
2024–2025	Aubagne	31	(3)
2025–	Valenciennes	30	(2)
- * Club domestic league appearances and goals as of 23 June 2026

Mabrouk Haiça Rouaï (born 1 November 2000) is a French professional footballer who plays as a midfielder for Ligue 3 club Valenciennes.

== Professional career ==
On 22 July 2020, Rouaï signed his first professional contract with Nacional until 2024. Rouaï made his professional debut with Nacional in a 1−0 LigaPro win over Casa Pia on 1 December 2019.

On 1 September 2022, Rouaï transferred to Primeira Liga side Estoril.

On 7 September 2023, Liga 3 club Anadia announced the signing of Rouaï.

== Personal life ==
Born in France, Rouaï was born to an Algerian father and a Tunisian mother.
