= Enzo Martínez (footballer, born 1998) =

Uruguayan footballer

Personal information
- Full name: Enzo Gabriel Martínez Suárez
- Date of birth: 29 April 1998 (age 28)
- Place of birth: Artigas, Uruguay
- Height: 1.83 m (6 ft 0 in)
- Position: Centre-back

Team information
- Current team: Gimnasia LP
- Number: 21

Youth career
- 2013–2018: Peñarol

Senior career*
Years	Team	Apps	(Gls)
2018–2021	Peñarol	21	(1)
2020–2021	→ Tondela (loan)	29	(0)
2021–2022	Vélez Sarsfield	3	(1)
2022–2023	Querétaro	22	(0)
2023	Pachuca	6	(0)
2023–2024	Defensor Sporting	10	(0)
2024	Liverpool Montevideo	16	(0)
2024–	Gimnasia LP	35	(3)
- * Club domestic league appearances and goals as of 17:22, 9 July 2026 (UTC)

Enzo Gabriel Martínez Suárez (born 29 April 1998) is a Uruguayan professional footballer who plays as a centre-back for Gimnasia LP.

== Career ==
A youth academy graduate of Peñarol, Martínez made his professional debut on 29 April 2018 in Peñarol's 1–0 win against Progreso. He scored his first goal on 19 September 2019 in 2–1 win against Rampla Juniors.

He was loaned to the Portuguese team C.D. Tondela for the 2020-21 season, then Club Atlético Vélez Sarsfield in Argentina for 2021. He moved to the Mexican team Querétaro F.C. on 1 January 2022.

== Career statistics ==
As of 20 February 2022

Club	Season	League			Cup		Continental		Other		Total	
Club	Season	Division	Apps	Goals	Apps	Goals	Apps	Goals	Apps	Goals	Apps	Goals
Peñarol	2018	Uruguayan Primera División	2	0	—		0	0	0	0	2	0
Peñarol	2019	Uruguayan Primera División	15	1	—		3 (Note: Two appearances in Copa Sudamericana and one appearance in Copa Libertadores.)	0	2 (Note: One appearance each in Supercopa Uruguaya and Torneo Clausura decider.)	0	20	1
Peñarol	2020	Uruguayan Primera División	2	0	—		0	0	—		2	0
C.D. Tondela	2020-21	Primeira Liga	29	0	—		0	0	0	0	29	0
Club Atlético Vélez Sarsfield	2020-21	Argentine Primera División	3	1	—		0	0	0	0	3	1
Querétaro F.C.	2021-2022	Liga MX	5	0	—		0	0	0	0	5	0
Career total			56	2	0	0	3	0	2	0	61	2
