= Zaidu Sanusi =

Nigerian footballer

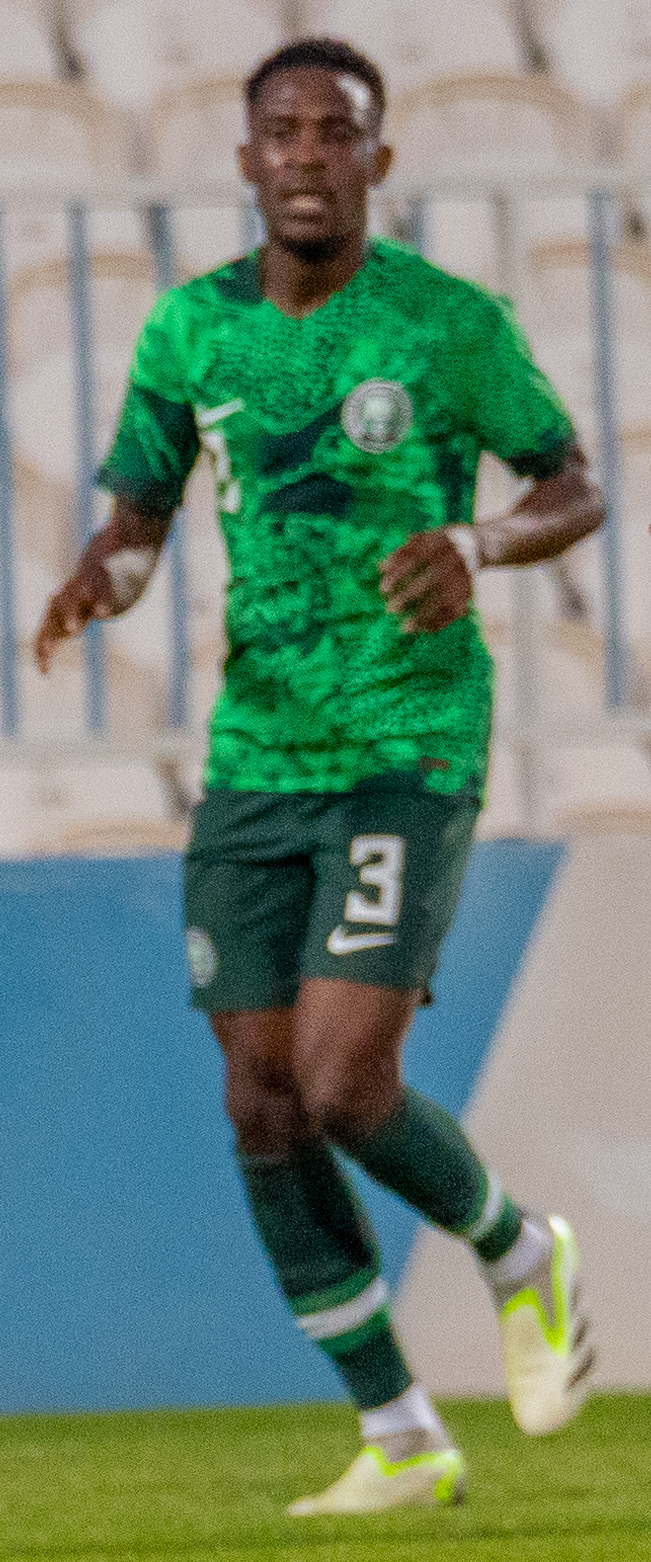
- Sanusi with Nigeria in 2024

Personal information
- Full name: Zaidu Sanusi
- Date of birth: 13 June 1997 (age 29)
- Place of birth: Jega, Nigeria
- Height: 1.82 m (6 ft 0 in)
- Position: Left-back

Team information
- Current team: Porto
- Number: 12

Youth career
- 2013–2016: Jega United

Senior career*
Years	Team	Apps	(Gls)
2016–2018	Gil Vicente	0	(0)
2017–2018	→ Mirandela (loan)	39	(0)
2018–2019	Mirandela	32	(3)
2019–2020	Santa Clara	24	(1)
2020–	Porto	99	(6)
2024	Porto B	2	(0)

International career^{‡}
2020–	Nigeria	32	(0)
Medal record
Representing Nigeria
Africa Cup of Nations
Runner-up	2023 Ivory Coast
Third place	2025 Morocco
- * Club domestic league appearances and goals as of 20:00, 8 November 2026 (UTC) ‡ National team caps and goals as of 21:45, 10 June 2026 (UTC)

Zaidu Sanusi MON (born 13 June 1997) is a Nigerian professional footballer who plays as a left-back for Primeira Liga club Porto and the Nigeria national team.

He spent his senior career in Portugal, playing in the Primeira Liga with Santa Clara and Porto, winning a double of league and Taça de Portugal with the latter in the 2021–22 season.

Sanusi made his senior international debut for Nigeria in 2020, and was part of the squads at the 2021, 2023 and 2025 Africa Cup of Nations.

== Club career ==
=== Early career ===
Born in Jega, Kebbi, the 19-year-old Sanusi signed with Gil Vicente F.C. of the Portuguese Primeira Liga in 2016. In January 2017, he was loaned to third division club SC Mirandela.

Sanusi reached an agreement to join C.D. Santa Clara on 16 March 2019, with the deal being made effective on 1 July. He made his Portuguese top-flight debut on 15 September that year, coming on as a late substitute in a 2–0 home win against Moreirense FC. He scored his first goal in the competition on 23 June 2020, in a 4–3 away victory over S.L. Benfica which marked the Azoreans' first-ever at the Estádio da Luz.

=== Porto ===
On 30 August 2020, Sanusi signed a five-year contract with FC Porto. He scored his first goal on 25 November, opening a 2–1 win at Olympique de Marseille in the group stage of the UEFA Champions League, being named in the tournament's Team of the Week. He won the first trophy of his career on 23 December, when he played the entire 2–0 defeat of Benfica in the Supertaça Cândido de Oliveira, and finished his first year with 41 competitive matches, scoring in the 4–3 league win over C.D. Tondela.

Sanusi remained first choice in the 2021–22 campaign despite the signing of Wendell, and scored the only goal in the 93rd minute of O Clássico against Benfica on 7 May 2022 to seal the club's 30th league title. Fifteen days later, he started and finished the final of the Taça de Portugal, defeating Tondela 3–1.

In 2022–23, Sanusi fought for a starting place with the Brazilian. He suffered a muscle injury in a Champions League group victory against Atlético Madrid on 1 November, and did not return until February.

Sanusi missed the vast majority of the following two seasons, mainly due to a serious anterior cruciate ligament injury to his left knee.

== International career ==
Sanusi made his debut for the Nigeria national team on 9 October 2020, in a 1–0 friendly defeat against Algeria in Klagenfurt. He earned his first official cap the following month, in the 4–4 home draw with Sierra Leone for the 2021 Africa Cup of Nations qualifiers. At the finals in Cameroon, the team were eliminated in the last 16 by Tunisia; manager Augustine Eguavoen was criticised for ordering Sanusi and right-back Ola Aina not to attack before they were losing with ten men.

Sanusi was also selected for the 2023 and 2025 continental tournaments.

== Career statistics ==
=== Club ===
As of match played 8 November 2026

Appearances and goals by club, season and competition
Club	Season	League			Taça de Portugal		Taça da Liga		Europe		Other		Total	
Club	Season	Division	Apps	Goals	Apps	Goals	Apps	Goals	Apps	Goals	Apps	Goals	Apps	Goals
Mirandela (loan)	2016–17	Campeonato de Portugal	17	0	0	0	—		—		—		17	0
Mirandela (loan)	2017–18	Campeonato de Portugal	22	0	0	0	—		—		—		22	0
Mirandela	2018–19	Campeonato de Portugal	32	3	3	0	—		—		—		35	3
Mirandela	Total		71	3	3	0	—		—		—		74	3
Santa Clara	2019–20	Primeira Liga	24	1	1	0	2	0	—		—		27	1
Porto	2020–21	Primeira Liga	25	1	4	0	1	0	10 (Note: Appearances in UEFA Champions League)	1	1 (Note: Appearance in Supertaça Cândido de Oliveira)	0	41	2
Porto	2021–22	Primeira Liga	24	3	6	0	0	0	10 (Note: Six appearances in UEFA Champions League, four appearances in UEFA Europa League)	0	—		40	3
Porto	2022–23	Primeira Liga	18	0	3	0	1	0	8	1	1	0	31	1
Porto	2023–24	Primeira Liga	5	1	0	0	0	0	4	0	1	0	10	1
Porto	2024–25	Primeira Liga	3	0	0	0	1	0	2 (Note: Appearances in UEFA Europa League)	0	0	0	6	0
Porto	2025–26	Primeira Liga	17	1	0	0	1	0	8	0	—		26	1
Porto	2026–27	Primeira Liga	7	0	1	0	0	0	2	0	1	0	11	0
Porto	Total		99	6	14	0	4	0	44	2	4	0	165	8
Porto B	2024–25	Liga Portugal 2	2	0	—		—		—		—		2	0
Career total			196	10	18	0	6	0	44	2	4	0	268	12

=== International ===
As of match played 10 June 2026

Appearances and goals by national team and year
National team	Year	Apps	Goals
Nigeria	2020	3	0
Nigeria	2021	3	0
Nigeria	2022	6	0
Nigeria	2023	3	0
Nigeria	2024	7	0
Nigeria	2025	7	0
Nigeria	2026	3	0
Total		32	0

== Honours ==
Porto

- Primeira Liga: 2021–22, 2025–26
- Taça de Portugal: 2021–22, 2022–23
- Taça da Liga: 2022–23
- Supertaça Cândido de Oliveira: 2020, 2022, 2026

Nigeria

- Africa Cup of Nations runner-up: 2023; third place: 2025

Orders

- Member of the Order of the Niger
