= List of Portuguese football transfers summer 2022 =

This is a list of Portuguese football transfers for the summer of 2022. The summer transfer window will open 1 July and close at midnight on 31 August. Players may be bought before the transfer windows opens, but may only join their new club on 1 July. Only moves involving Primeira Liga clubs are listed. Additionally, players without a club may join a club at any time.

== Transfers ==
Date	Name	Moving from	Moving to	Fee
2 May 2022	(Brazil) Yago Cariello	União de Santarém	Portimonense	Undisclosed
10 May 2022	(South Africa) Lyle Foster	Vitória de Guimarães	(Belgium) Westerlo	€1m
17 May 2022	(Spain) Pedro Porro	(England) Manchester City	Sporting CP	Undisclosed
18 May 2022	(Brazil) Matheus Índio	(Oman) Al-Nasr	Vitória de Guimarães	Undisclosed
19 May 2022	(Brazil) Anderson Silva	(China) Beijing Guoan	Vitória de Guimarães	Free
20 May 2022	(Croatia) Petar Musa	(Czech Republic) Slavia Prague	Benfica	Undisclosed
24 May 2022	(Uruguay) Ignacio de Arruabarrena	(Uruguay) Montevideo Wanderers	Arouca	Free
26 May 2022	(Serbia) Mihailo Ristić	(France) Montpellier	Benfica	Free
28 May 2022	(Japan) Ryoya Ogawa	(Japan) FC Tokyo	Vitória de Guimarães	Loan
31 May 2022	(Portugal) Rui Gomes	Covilhã	Portimonense	Undisclosed
31 May 2022	(Portugal) Nuno Mendes	Sporting CP	(France) Paris Saint-Germain	€38m
1 June 2022	(Portugal) Jota Silva	Casa Pia	Vitória de Guimarães	Undisclosed
1 June 2022	(Portugal) André Simões	(Greece) AEK Athens	Famalicão	Undisclosed
3 June 2022	(Brazil) Sávio	Rio Ave	(Brazil) Goiás	Loan
4 June 2022	(Portugal) Théo Fonseca	Felgueiras 1932	Famalicão	Undisclosed
5 June 2022	(Portugal) Leonardo Buta	Braga	(Italy) Udinese	Undisclosed
5 June 2022	(Portugal) Rafa Soares	Vitória Guimarães	(Greece) PAOK	Undisclosed
7 June 2022	(Denmark) Alexander Bah	(Czech Republic) Slavia Prague	Benfica	Undisclosed
7 June 2022	(France) Vincent Sasso	(Switzerland) Servette	Boavista	Undisclosed
9 June 2022	(Portugal) Pité	Arouca	Mafra	Undisclosed
11 June 2022	(Portugal) Salvador Agra	Tondela	Boavista	Undisclosed
12 June 2022	(Portugal) Luís Rocha	Chaves	Moreirense	Undisclosed
13 June 2022	(Romania) Andrei Chindriș	Santa Clara	(Romania) UTA Arad	Undisclosed
13 June 2022	(Portugal) Rúben Semedo	Porto	(Greece) Olympiacos	Loan Return
13 June 2022	(Portugal) Reko Silva	Portimonense	Estrela da Amadora	Undisclosed
13 June 2022	(Portugal) Pêpê	Famalicão	(Greece) Olympiacos	Loan Return
14 June 2022	(Portugal) Bruno Lourenço	Estoril Praia	Boavista	Undisclosed
14 June 2022	(Uruguay) Darwin Núñez	Benfica	(England) Liverpool	€75m
15 June 2022	(France) Denis-Will Poha	Vitória de Guimarães	(Switzerland) Sion	Undisclosed
15 June 2022	(Portugal) Jair Tavares	Benfica	(Scotland) Hibernian	Undisclosed
20 June 2022	(Croatia) Toni Borevković	Vitória de Guimarães	(Croatia) Hajduk Split	Loan
20 June 2022	(Brazil) Everton	Benfica	(Brazil) Flamengo	Undisclosed
20 June 2022	(Brazil) David Neres	(Ukraine) Shakhtar Donetsk	Benfica	Undisclosed
21 June 2022	(Portugal) Gonçalo Costa	Sporting CP	Portimonense	Undisclosed
21 June 2022	(Russia) Stanislav Kritsyuk	(Russia) Zenit Saint Petersburg	Gil Vicente	Free
21 June 2022	(Portugal) Pedro Marques	Sporting CP	(Netherlands) NEC	Undisclosed
21 June 2022	(Spain) Rafa Mújica	(Spain) Las Palmas	Arouca	Undisclosed
21 June 2022	(Ivory Coast) Zié Ouattara	Vitória de Guimarães	Portimonense	Undisclosed
21 June 2022	(Senegal) Moustapha Seck	Leixões	Portimonense	Undisclosed
21 June 2022	(Portugal) Fábio Vieira	Porto	(England) Arsenal	€35m
21 June 2022	(Brazil) Wellington	Chaves	(Saudi Arabia) Al-Arabi	Undisclosed
22 June 2022	(Portugal) Tomás Domingos	Mafra	Santa Clara	Undisclosed
22 June 2022	(Australia) Samuel Silvera	Paços de Ferreira	(Australia) Central Coast Mariners	Undisclosed
23 June 2022	(Brazil) Vinicius Guarapuava	(Brazil) Azuriz	Portimonense	Loan
23 June 2022	(Portugal) Gui Guedes	Vitória de Guimarães	(Spain) Almería	Undisclosed
23 June 2022	(Portugal) Leandro Silva	Arouca	(Israel) Hapoel Haifa	Undisclosed
23 June 2022	(Guinea) Morlaye Sylla	(Guinea) Horoya	Arouca	Undisclosed
24 June 2022	(Portugal) Fábio Duarte	Benfica	Vilafranquense	Undisclosed
24 June 2022	(England) Jerome Opoku	(England) Fulham	Arouca	Free
24 June 2022	(Ecuador) Jackson Porozo	Boavista	(France) Troyes	Undisclosed
24 June 2022	(Ghana) Maxwell Woledzi	(Denmark) Nordsjælland	Vitória de Guimarães	Undisclosed
25 June 2022	(Portugal) António Xavier	Estoril	(Greece) Panathinaikos	Loan Return
25 June 2022	(Portugal) Tiago Dantas	Benfica	(Greece) PAOK	Loan
25 June 2022	(Portugal) Martim Maia	Amora	Santa Clara	Undisclosed
25 June 2022	(Portugal) Pedro Tiba	(Poland) Lech Poznań	Gil Vicente	Free
26 June 2022	(Portugal) Diogo Pinto	Estrela da Amadora	Casa Pia	Undisclosed
27 June 2022	(Portugal) Rui Fonte	Estoril Praia	Famalicão	Free
27 June 2022	(Scotland) Jordan Holsgrove	(Spain) Celta Vigo	Paços de Ferreira	Undisclosed
27 June 2022	(Venezuela) Mikel Villanueva	Santa Clara	Vitória de Guimarães	Undisclosed
28 June 2022	(Angola) Anderson Cruz	Rio Ave	(Angola) Petro de Luanda	Loan
28 June 2022	(Portugal) Tiago Esgaio	Braga	Arouca	Loan
28 June 2022	(Brazil) João Magno	Canelas 2010	Paços de Ferreira	Undisclosed
28 June 2022	(Portugal) Rodrigo Martins	Mafra	Estoril Praia	Undisclosed
28 June 2022	(France) Sikou Niakaté	(France) EA Guingamp	Braga	Loan
28 June 2022	(Brazil) Raúl Silva	Braga	(Romania) Universitatea Craiova	Undisclosed
29 June 2022	(Portugal) Rafael Brito	Benfica	Marítimo	Loan
29 June 2022	(Spain) Víctor Gómez	(Spain) RCD Espanyol	Braga	Loan
29 June 2022	(Brazil) Henrique	Marítimo	(Bulgaria) CSKA 1948	Undisclosed
29 June 2022	(Portugal) Hélder Morim	Leixões	Chaves	Undisclosed
29 June 2022	(Brazil) Rodrigo Moura	Trofense	Chaves	Undisclosed
29 June 2022	(Portugal) Ricardo Silva	Porto	Santa Clara	Undisclosed
29 June 2022	(Ivory Coast) Habib Sylla	Leiria	Chaves	Undisclosed
30 June 2022	(Portugal) Nuno Campos	Chaves	Torreense	Undisclosed
30 June 2022	(Angola) Gelson Dala	Rio Ave	(Qatar) Al-Wakrah	Undisclosed
30 June 2022	(France) Titouan Thomas	(France) Lyon	Estoril Praia	Undisclosed
30 June 2022	(Portugal) Vitinha	Porto	(France) Paris Saint-Germain	€41.5m
1 July 2022	(Nigeria) Abdullahi Ibrahim Alhassan	Nacional	(Belgium) Beerschot	Free
1 July 2022	(Portugal) Tiago Araújo	Benfica	Estroil Praia	Undisclosed
1 July 2022	(Portugal) Fábio Baptista	Benfica	(Belgium) Sint-Truiden	Undisclosed
1 July 2022	(Portugal) Gonçalo Esteves	Sporting CP	Estoril Praia	Loan
1 July 2022	(Portugal) Jota	Benfica	(Scotland) Celtic	€7.5m
1 July 2022	(Japan) Hidemasa Morita	Santa Clara	Sporting CP	Undisclosed
1 July 2022	(Brazil) Pastor	(Brazil) Ferroviária	Portimonense	Loan
1 July 2022	(Brazil) Alexsandro Ribeiro	Chaves	(France) Lille	Undisclosed
1 July 2022	(Argentina) Iván Rossi	Marítimo	(Colombia) Atlético Junior	Undisclosed
1 July 2022	(Mali) Falaye Sacko	Vitória de Guimarães	(France) Montpellier	Loan
1 July 2022	(Serbia) Mile Svilar	Benfica	(Italy) Roma	Free
2 July 2022	(Brazil) Lucas Barros	Covilhã	Gil Vicente	Undisclosed
2 July 2022	(Croatia) Fabijan Buntić	(Germany) Ingolstadt 04	Vizela	Undisclosed
2 July 2022	(Brazil) Robson Reis	(Brazil) Santos	Boavista	Loan
2 July 2022	(Portugal) Marcos Silva	Marítimo	Alverca	Loan
2 July 2022	(Argentina) Lucho Vega	Estoril Praia	Marítimo	Undisclosed
3 July 2022	(Brazil) João Afonso	Gil Vicente	Marítimo	Free
3 July 2022	(Brazil) Paulo Victor	Marítimo	(Saudi Arabia) Al-Ettifaq	Free
4 July 2022	(Japan) Kanya Fujimoto	(Japan) Tokyo Verdy	Gil Vicente	Undisclosed
4 July 2022	(Portugal) João Palhinha	Sporting CP	(England) Fulham	£20m
4 July 2022	(Spain) Xavi Quintillà	(Spain) Villarreal	Santa Clara	Undisclosed
4 July 2022	(Canada) Steven Vitória	Moreirense	Chaves	Undisclosed
5 July 2022	(Portugal) Diogo Abreu	Porto	Sporting CP	Undisclosed
5 July 2022	(Portugal) Eduardo Borges	Pedras Salgadas	Chaves	Undisclosed
5 July 2022	(Portugal) David Carmo	Braga	Porto	€20m
5 July 2022	(Nigeria) Tyronne Ebuehi	Benfica	(Italy) Empoli	Undisclosed
5 July 2022	(Canada) Stephen Eustáquio	Paços de Ferreira	Porto	Undisclosed
5 July 2022	(Brazil) Lucas Flores	(Brazil) Internacional	Rio Ave	Undisclosed
6 July 2022	(Portugal) Pedro Álvaro	Benfica	Estroil Praia	Undisclosed
6 July 2022	(Brazil) Victor Braga	Arouca	(Saudi Arabia) Al-Tai	Undisclosed
6 July 2022	(Uruguay) Franco Israel	(Italy) Juventus	Sporting CP	Undisclosed
6 July 2022	(Portugal) Nélson Monte	(Ukraine) Dnipro-1	Chaves	Loan
6 July 2022	(Portugal) João Nunes	(Hungary) Puskás Akadémia	Casa Pia	Undisclosed
6 July 2022	(Netherlands) Calvin Verdonk	Famalicão	(Netherlands) NEC	Undisclosed
7 July 2022	(Portugal) Rochinha	Vitória de Guimarães	Sporting CP	Undisclosed
7 July 2022	(Netherlands) Nigel Thomas	(Netherlands) PSV	Paços de Ferreira	Undisclosed
7 July 2022	(Portugal) Rodrigo Valente	Estoril Praia	Santa Clara	Undisclosed
7 July 2022	(Portugal) João Valido	Vitória de Setúbal	Arouca	Undisclosed
7 July 2022	(Brazil) João Victor	(Brazil) Corinthians	Benfica	Undisclosed
8 July 2022	(Brazil) Samuel Lino	Gil Vicente	(Spain) Atlético Madrid	Undisclosed
8 July 2022	(Spain) Álex Millán	(Spain) Villarreal	Famalicão	Loan
8 July 2022	(Ukraine) Bohdan Milovanov	(Spain) Sporting Gijón	Arouca	Undisclosed
8 July 2022	(Brazil) Diego Rosa	(England) Manchester City	Vizela	Loan
8 July 2022	(Cape Verde) Fernando Varela	(Greece) PAOK	Casa Pia	Undisclosed
8 July 2022	(Brazil) Patrick William	Famalicão	Rio Ave	Undisclosed
9 July 2022	(Ivory Coast) Ismaila Soro	(Scotland) Celtic	Arouca	Loan
11 July 2022	(Wales) Owen Beck	(England) Liverpool	Famalicão	Loan
11 July 2022	(Portugal) Zé Carlos	Braga	(Spain) Ibiza	Loan
11 July 2022	(Ecuador) Gonzalo Plata	Sporting CP	(Spain) Real Valladolid	Undisclosed
11 July 2022	(Portugal) Jota Silva	Casa Pia	Vitória de Guimarães	Undisclosed
12 July 2022	(Portugal) Rafael Camacho	Sporting CP	(Greece) Aris	Loan
12 July 2022	(Portugal) Rafael Fernandes	Sporting CP	Arouca	€10m
12 July 2022	(Spain) Carles Soria	Estoril	(Greece) PAS Giannina	Undisclosed
13 July 2022	(Slovakia) Róbert Boženík	(Netherlands) Feyenoord	Boavista	Loan
13 July 2022	(Colombia) Óscar Estupiñán	Vitória de Guimarães	(England) Hull City	Free
13 July 2022	(Brazil) Gustavo Klismahn	Alverca	Portimonense	Undisclosed
13 July 2022	(Honduras) Bryan Róchez	Nacional	Portimonense	Undisclosed
13 July 2022	(Portugal) Francisco Trincão	(Spain) Barcelona	Sporting CP	Loan
14 July 2022	(Argentina) Enzo Fernández	(Argentina) River Plate	Benfica	€10m
14 July 2022	(Spain) Héctor Hernández	(Spain) Rayo Majadahonda	Chaves	Undisclosed
14 July 2022	(Portugal) Manuel Namora	Boavista	Felgueiras 1932	Loan
15 July 2022	(Uruguay) Juan Manuel Boselli	(Uruguay) Defensor	Gil Vicente	Undisclosed
15 July 2022	(Portugal) Ferro	Benfica	(Netherlands) Vitesse	Loan
15 July 2022	(France) Junior Kadile	(France) Rennes	Famalicão	Loan
15 July 2022	(Cape Verde) Luís Lopes	Benfica	(Scotland) Aberdeen	Undisclosed
15 July 2022	(Democratic Republic of the Congo) Chancel Mbemba	Porto	(France) Marseille	Free
15 July 2022	(Brazil) André Silva	Arouca	Vitória de Guimarães	Undisclosed
16 July 2022	(Uganda) Mustafa Kizza	(United States) CF Montréal	Arouca	Free
16 July 2022	(Brazil) Paulo Vitor	(Spain) Real Valladolid	Rio Ave	Loan
17 July 2022	(Brazil) Júlio Romão	Santa Clara	(Azerbaijan) Qarabağ	Undisclosed
18 July 2022	(Spain) Martín Aguirregabiria	(Spain) Alavés	Famalicão	Free
18 July 2022	(Japan) Masaki Watai	(Japan) Tokushima Vortis	Boavista	Loan
19 July 2022	(France) Simon Banza	(France) Lens	Braga	€3m
19 July 2022	(Cameroon) Yan Eteki	(Spain) Granada	Casa Pia	Undisclosed
19 July 2022	(Brazil) Euller	(Cyprus) AEL Limassol	Chaves	Undisclosed
19 July 2022	(Portugal) Vasco Paciência	Benfica	Académica de Coimbra	Undisclosed
19 July 2022	(Brazil) Arthur Sales	(Belgium) Lommel	Paços de Ferreira	Loan
19 July 2022	(Switzerland) Haris Seferovic	Benfica	(Turkey) Galatasaray	Loan
20 July 2022	(Brazil) César	(Brazil) Bahia	Boavista	Undisclosed
20 July 2022	(Portugal) André Ferreira	Paços de Ferreira	(Spain) Granada	Undisclosed
20 July 2022	(Portugal) João Ferreira	Benfica	Rio Ave	Loan
20 July 2022	(Portugal) Fran Pereira	Boavista	Estoril Praia	Undisclosed
20 July 2022	(Brazil) Vitinho	(Brazil) Corinthians	Arouca	Undisclosed
21 July 2022	(Spain) Oriol Busquets	(France) Clermont Foot	Arouca	Undisclosed
21 July 2022	(Portugal) Francisco Conceição	Porto	(Netherlands) Ajax	Undisclosed
21 July 2022	(Portugal) Ricardo Moura	Chaves	Leixões	Free
22 July 2022	(Venezuela) Eduardo Fereira	(Venezuela) Caracas	Casa Pia	Undisclosed
22 July 2022	(Portugal) Tiago Ilori	Sporting CP	Paços de Ferreira	Loan
22 July 2022	(Switzerland) Charles Pickel	Famalicão	(Italy) Cremonese	Undisclosed
22 July 2022	(Brazil) Gabriel Veron	(Brazil) Palmeiras	Porto	€10.5m
23 July 2022	(Portugal) Sandro Cruz	Benfica	Chaves	Loan
23 July 2022	(Cameroon) James Léa Siliki	(France) Rennes	Estoril Praia	Undisclosed
23 July 2022	(Spain) Kevin Villodres	(Spain) Málaga	Gil Vicente	Loan
24 July 2022	(Brazil) Luiz Phellype	Sporting CP	(Japan) FC Tokyo	Loan
24 July 2022	(Czech Republic) Matouš Trmal	Vitória de Guimarães	Marítimo	Loan
25 July 2022	(Spain) Antoñín	(Spain) Granada	Vitória de Guimarães	Loan
25 July 2022	(Senegal) Mor Ndiaye	Porto	Estoril Praia	Undisclosed
25 July 2022	(Brazil) Guilherme Schettine	Braga	(Switzerland) Grasshopper	Loan
26 July 2022	(Portugal) Andrezinho	(Slovakia) DAC 1904	Santa Clara	Free
26 July 2022	(Brazil) Clayton	(Brazil) Vila Nova	Casa Pia	Loan
27 July 2022	(Portugal) Tomás Araújo	Benfica	Gil Vicente	Loan
27 July 2022	(Portugal) Tiago Gouveia	Benfica	Estoril Praia	Loan
27 July 2022	(Japan) Takahiro Kunimoto	(Japan) Jeonbuk Hyundai Motors	Casa Pia	Free
27 July 2022	(Brazil) Rafael Martins	Moreirense	Casa Pia	Undisclosed
27 July 2022	(Portugal) Rúben Vinagre	Sporting CP	(England) Everton	Loan
28 July 2022	(Portugal) Rodrigo Guedes	Rio Ave	Académica de Coimbra	Loan
28 July 2022	(Portugal) Pizzi	Benfica	(United Arab Emirates) Al Wahda	Undisclosed
29 July 2022	(Portugal) Filipe Chaby	Sporting CP	(Azerbaijan) Sumgayit	Undisclosed
29 July 2022	(Mexico) Diego Lainez	(Spain) Real Betis	Braga	Loan
29 July 2022	(Senegal) Mamadou Loum	Porto	(England) Reading	Loan
29 July 2022	(Colombia) Leonardo Acevedo	Estoril Praia	Rio Ave	Undisclosed
30 July 2022	(Japan) Mizuki Arai	(Japan) Tokyo Verdy	Gil Vicente	Loan
30 July 2022	(Brazil) Matheus Pereira	(Brazil) Cruzeiro	Vizela	Undisclosed
30 July 2022	(Venezuela) Jesús Ramírez	(Mexico) Atlético Morelia	Marítimo	Loan
31 July 2022	(Spain) Pablo Moreno	(England) Manchester City	Marítimo	Undisclosed
1 August 2022	(Nigeria) Chidozie Awaziem	Boavista	(Croatia) Hajduk Split	Loan
1 August 2022	(Slovenia) Žiga Frelih	Gil Vicente	Chaves	Loan
1 August 2022	(Spain) Alejandro Marqués	(Italy) Juventus	Estoril Praia	Loan
2 August 2022	(Brazil) Anderson	(Bulgaria) Tsarsko Selo	Casa Pia	Undisclosed
2 August 2022	(Brazil) Pedro Bicalho	(Brazil) Palmeiras	Santa Clara	Loan
2 August 2022	(Argentina) Santiago Colombatto	(Mexico) León	Famalicão	Loan
2 August 2022	(Portugal) Tomás Esteves	Porto	(Italy) Pisa	Loan
2 August 2022	(South Africa) Kobamelo Kodisang	Braga	Moreirense	Loan
2 August 2022	(Brazil) Gabriel Silva	(Brazil) Palmeiras	Santa Clara	Loan
3 August 2022	(Portugal) Hugo Gomes	Rio Ave	Moreirense	Loan
4 August 2022	(Brazil) Victor Bobsin	(Brazil) Grêmio	Santa Clara	Undisclosed
4 August 2022	(Brazil) Cassiano	Vizela	(Saudi Arabia) Al Faisaly	Undisclosed
4 August 2022	(France) Mohamed Diaby	Paços de Ferreira	Portimonense	Undisclosed
4 August 2022	(Spain) Carlos Isaac	(Spain) Alavés	Vizela	Undisclosed
4 August 2022	(France) Lenny Lacroix	(France) Metz	Benfica	Undisclosed
4 August 2022	(Portugal) Eduardo Quaresma	Sporting CP	(Germany) 1899 Hoffenheim	Loan
4 August 2022	(France) Zaydou Youssouf	(France) Saint-Étienne	Famalicão	Undisclosed
5 August 2022	(Ivory Coast) Idrissa Doumbia	Sporting CP	(Turkey) Alanyaspor	Loan
5 August 2022	(Portugal) André Franco	Estoril Praia	Porto	Undisclosed
5 August 2022	(Guinea-Bissau) Pelé	(France) Monaco	Famalicão	Loan
5 August 2022	(Brazil) Nathan Santos	Boavista	(Brazil) Santos	Undisclosed
5 August 2022	(Portugal) Nuno Santos	Benfica	(United States) Charlotte FC	Undisclosed
6 August 2022	(Brazil) Adriano	(Brazil) Cruzeiro	Santa Clara	Undisclosed
6 August 2022	(Brazil) Paulo Eduardo	(Brazil) Cruzeiro	Santa Clara	Undisclosed
6 August 2022	(Portugal) Herculano Nabian	Vitória de Guimarães	(Italy) Empoli	Loan
7 August 2022	(Portugal) Pedro Pelágio	Marítimo	(Cyprus) Pafos	Loan
9 August 2022	(Brazil) Luiz Felipe	Belenenses	Vizela	Undisclosed
9 August 2022	(Portugal) Hernâni	(Spain) Las Palmas	Rio Ave	Free
9 August 2022	(Portugal) Rúben Pereira	Chaves	Trofense	Loan
9 August 2022	(Brazil) Rildo	(Brazil) Grêmio	Santa Clara	Undisclosed
10 August 2022	(Portugal) Bruno Almeida	Trofense	Santa Clara	Loan
10 August 2022	(Montenegro) Milutin Osmajić	(Spain) Cádiz	Vizela	Loan
10 August 2022	(Guinea-Bissau) Alfa Semedo	Vitória de Guimarães	(Saudi Arabia) Al-Tai	Undisclosed
10 August 2022	(Spain) Antonio Zarzana	(Spain) Sevilla	Marítimo	Loan
11 August 2022	(Ivory Coast) N'Dri Philippe Koffi	(France) Reims	Paços de Ferreira	Loan
11 August 2022	(Portugal) João Novais	Braga	(United Arab Emirates) Al Bataeh	Undisclosed
11 August 2022	(Portugal) Pedro Silva	Vizela	Estoril Praia	Undisclosed
12 August 2022	(Brazil) Gabriel	Benfica	(Brazil) Botafogo	Loan
12 August 2022	(Ivory Coast) Koffi Kouao	Vizela	(France) Metz	Undisclosed
13 August 2022	(Brazil) Kayky	(England) Manchester City	Paços de Ferreira	Loan
14 August 2022	(Spain) Adrián Marín	(Spain) Granada	Gil Vicente	Undisclosed
15 August 2022	(Albania) Enea Mihaj	(Greece) PAOK	Famalicão	Undisclosed
15 August 2022	(Panama) Puma Rodríguez	(Spain) Alavés	Famalicão	Free
16 August 2022	(Ghana) Emmanuel Boateng	(China) Dalian Professional	Rio Ave	Undisclosed
17 August 2022	(Nigeria) Bruno Onyemaechi	Feirense	Boavista	Loan
18 August 2022	(Brazil) Mateus	(Brazil) Palmeiras	Portimonense	Loan
18 August 2022	(Portugal) Matheus Nunes	Sporting CP	(England) Wolverhampton Wanderers	£38m
19 August 2022	(Venezuela) Jeriel De Santis	Boavista	(Spain) Cartagena	Loan
19 August 2022	(Portugal) Gonçalo Pinto	Sporting CP	Chaves	Undisclosed
19 August 2022	(Portugal) Eduardo Schürrle	Braga	Trofense	Loan
22 August 2022	(Brazil) Matheus Babi	(Brazil) Athletico Paranaense	Santa Clara	Loan
22 August 2022	(Portugal) João Carvalho	(Greece) Olympiacos	Estoril Praia	Loan
22 August 2022	(Brazil) Guilherme	Vianense	Chaves	Undisclosed
23 August 2022	(Portugal) Romário Baró	Porto	Casa Pia	Loan
23 August 2022	(Ecuador) Erick Ferigra	(Spain) Las Palmas	Paços de Ferreira	Free
23 August 2022	(Portugal) Bruno Jordão	(England) Wolverhampton Wanderers	Santa Clara	Loan
23 August 2022	(Portugal) Tiago Morais	Boavista	Leixões	Loan
23 August 2022	(Portugal) Francisco Moura	Braga	Famalicão	Loan
24 August 2022	(Brazil) Matheus Araújo	(Brazil) Vasco da Gama	Santa Clara	Loan
24 August 2022	(Norway) Fredrik Aursnes	(Netherlands) Feyenoord	Benfica	€13m
24 August 2022	(Spain) Adrián Butzke	(Spain) Granada	Paços de Ferreira	Loan
24 August 2022	(Spain) Mario González	Braga	(Belgium) OH Leuven	Loan
24 August 2022	(Brazil) Kibe	Marítimo	Canelas 2010	Loan
24 August 2022	(Mozambique) Mexer	(France) Bordeaux	Estoril Praia	Free
24 August 2022	(South Africa) Luther Singh	(Denmark) Copenhagen	Chaves	Loan
25 August 2022	(Portugal) André Almeida	Vitória de Guimarães	(Spain) Valencia	Undisclosed
25 August 2022	(Brazil) Gabriel Batista	(Brazil) Flamengo	Santa Clara	Free
25 August 2022	(France) Shaquil Delos	(France) Nancy	Estoril Praia	Loan
25 August 2022	(Portugal) Vivaldo Semedo	Sporting CP	(Italy) Udinese	Undisclosed
25 August 2022	(Algeria) Islam Slimani	Sporting CP	(France) Brest	Undisclosed
26 August 2022	(Portugal) Zé Carlos	Varzim	Vitória de Guimarães	Loan
26 August 2022	(United States) Joel Soñora	(Argentina) Banfield	Marítimo	Undisclosed
28 August 2022	(Portugal) Josué Sá	(Bulgaria) Ludogorets Razgrad	Rio Ave	€200k
29 August 2022	(Portugal) Pedro Mendes	Sporting CP	(Italy) Ascoli	Undisclosed
29 August 2022	(Greece) Andreas Samaris	(Netherlands) Fortuna Sittard	Rio Ave	Free
29 August 2022	(Ukraine) Roman Yaremchuk	Benfica	(Belgium) Club Brugge	Undisclosed
30 August 2022	(Greece) Sotiris Alexandropoulos	(Greece) Panathinaikos	Sporting CP	Undisclosed
30 August 2022	(Guinea) Ibrahima Camará	Moreirense	Boavista	Undisclosed
30 August 2022	(Brazil) Erison	(Brazil) Botafogo	Estoril Praia	Loan
31 August 2022	(Spain) Miguel Baeza	(Spain) Celta Vigo	Rio Ave	Loan
31 August 2022	(France) Dylan Batubinsika	Famalicão	(Israel) Maccabi Haifa	Undisclosed
31 August 2022	(Guinea-Bissau) Umaro Embaló	Benfica	(Netherlands) Fortuna Sittard	Undisclosed
31 August 2022	(Brazil) Willyan Rocha	Portimonense	(Russia) CSKA Moscow	Undisclosed
31 August 2022	(Switzerland) Bastien Toma	(Belgium) Genk	Paços de Ferreira	Loan
1 September 2022	(Ghana) Eric Ayiah	(France) Monaco	Gil Vicente	Undisclosed
1 September 2022	(United States) John Brooks	(Germany) VfL Wolfsburg	Benfica	Free
1 September 2022	(Portugal) Gonçalo Cardoso	(England) West Ham United	Marítimo	Undisclosed
1 September 2022	(Germany) Julian Draxler	(France) Paris Saint-Germain	Benfica	Loan
1 September 2022	(Algeria) Yanis Hamache	Boavista	(Ukraine) Dnipro-1	Undisclosed
1 September 2022	(Scotland) Mikey Johnston	(Scotland) Celtic	Vitória de Guimarães	Loan
1 September 2022	(Portugal) Zé Manuel	Rio Ave	Nacional	Loan
1 September 2022	(Ghana) Abdul Mumin	Vitória de Guimarães	(Spain) Rayo Vallecano	Undisclosed
1 September 2022	(Venezuela) Adalberto Peñaranda	(England) Watford	Boavista	Undisclosed
1 September 2022	(Cape Verde) Carlos Ponck	(Turkey) İstanbul Başakşehir	Chaves	Undisclosed
1 September 2022	(Brazil) Samuel Portugal	Portimonense	Porto	Undisclosed
1 September 2022	(Serbia) Uroš Račić	(Spain) Valencia	Braga	Loan
1 September 2022	(Turkey) Serdar Saatçı	(Turkey) Beşiktaş	Braga	Undisclosed
1 September 2022	(Brazil) Safira	Belenenses	Vitória de Guimarães	Undisclosed
1 September 2022	(Austria) Alexander Schmidt	(Austria) LASK	Vizela	Undisclosed
1 September 2022	(Cameroon) Duplexe Tchamba	(Denmark) SønderjyskE	Casa Pia	Loan
1 September 2022	(Slovenia) Igor Vekić	(Slovenia) Bravo	Paços de Ferreira	Loan
1 September 2022	(Brazil) Carlos Vinícius	Benfica	(England) Fulham	Undisclosed
1 September 2022	(Germany) Julian Weigl	Benfica	(Germany) Borussia Mönchengladbach	Loan
1 September 2022	(Belarus) Kirill Zinovich	(Russia) Lokomotiv Moscow	Vitória de Guimarães	Undisclosed
2 September 2022	(Mozambique) Geny Catamo	Sporting CP	Marítimo	Loan
2 September 2022	(Belgium) Pierre Dwomoh	(Belgium) Royal Antwerp	Braga	Loan
2 September 2022	(Brazil) Arthur Gomes	Estoril Praia	Sporting CP	Undisclosed
2 September 2022	(Peru) Percy Liza	(Peru) Sporting Cristal	Marítimo	Undisclosed
2 September 2022	(Turkey) Berke Özer	(Turkey) Fenerbahçe	Portimonense	Undisclosed
2 September 2022	(Belgium) Jan Vertonghen	Benfica	(Belgium) Anderlecht	Free
3 September 2022	(Nigeria) Emmanuel Maviram	Vizela	Länk FC Vilaverdense	Loan
3 September 2022	(Serbia) Filip Stevanović	(England) Manchester City	Santa Clara	Loan
6 September 2022	(Nigeria) Bamidele Yusuf	(Slovakia) Spartak Trnava	Estoril Praia	Undisclosed
7 September 2022	(Brazil) Ítalo	(Brazil) São Bernardo	Santa Clara	Undisclosed
8 September 2022	(Angola) João Batxi	Chaves	(Russia) Krasnodar	Undisclosed
8 September 2022	(Cape Verde) Kevin Pina	Chaves	(Russia) Krasnodar	Undisclosed
21 September 2022	(Ghana) Abass Issah	(Germany) Mainz 05	Chaves	Free
21 September 2022	(Peru) Didier La Torre	(Croatia) Osijek	Gil Vicente	Undisclosed
