= 2023–24 C.D. Santa Clara season =

C.D. Santa Clara
2023–24 season
- Manager: Vasco Matos
- Stadium: Estádio de São Miguel
- Liga Portugal 2: 1st (promoted)
- Taça de Portugal: Quarter-finals
- Taça da Liga: First round
- Top goalscorer: League: Bruno Almeida (15); All: Bruno Almeida (15)

The 2023–24 season was C.D. Santa Clara's 97th season in existence and first one back in the Liga Portugal 2. They also competed in the Taça de Portugal and Taça da Liga.

== Players ==
=== First-team squad ===
As of 27 September 2023

Note: Flags indicate national team as defined under FIFA eligibility rules; some limited exceptions apply. Players may hold more than one non-FIFA nationality.

No.	Pos.	Nation	Player
1	GK	BRA	Gabriel Batista
2	DF	POR	Diogo Calila
4	DF	POR	Pedro Pacheco
6	DF	VEN	Sema Velázquez
7	FW	BRA	Reinaldo
9	FW	BRA	João Marcos
10	FW	POR	Ricardinho
11	FW	POR	Andrezinho
13	DF	POR	Luís Rocha
16	DF	POR	Paulo Henrique (captain)
18	MF	BRA	Eduardo Ageu
19	MF	POR	Bruno Almeida
20	MF	BRA	Adriano
22	DF	POR	David Bruno

No.	Pos.	Nation	Player
23	DF	BRA	Sidney Lima
25	MF	POR	Miguel Pires
32	DF	BRA	MT (on loan from Vasco da Gama)
35	MF	POR	Serginho
42	DF	BRA	Lucas Soares
48	MF	BRA	Mateus Sarará
49	FW	BRA	Gabriel Silva
50	GK	POR	João Afonso
70	FW	BRA	Vinícius Lopes (on loan from Botafogo)
74	GK	ARG	Marcos Díaz
77	MF	BRA	Gustavo Klismahn (on loan from Portimonense)
98	GK	BRA	João Bravim
99	FW	BRA	Rafael Martins

=== Other players under contract ===
Note: Flags indicate national team as defined under FIFA eligibility rules; some limited exceptions apply. Players may hold more than one non-FIFA nationality.

No.	Pos.	Nation	Player
—	GK	POR	Marco Pereira
—	FW	URU	Gustavo Viera

=== Out on loan ===
Note: Flags indicate national team as defined under FIFA eligibility rules; some limited exceptions apply. Players may hold more than one non-FIFA nationality.

No.	Pos.	Nation	Player
37	MF	BRA	Rildo (at Portimonense until 30 June 2024)
43	DF	BRA	Paulo Eduardo (at Grêmio Novorizontino until 30 June 2024)
44	DF	BRA	Ítalo (at Ural Yekaterinburg until 30 June 2024)
80	MF	BRA	Victor Bobsin (at Daegu FC until 30 June 2024)
90	MF	BRA	Patrick (at Brasil de Pelotas until 31 December 2023)

== Transfers ==
=== In ===
Pos.	Player	Transferred from	Fee	Date	Source
MF	(Portugal) [[ ]]	(Portugal)	Free	July 2023	

=== Out ===
Pos.	Player	Transferred to	Fee	Date	Source
MF	(Portugal) [[ ]]	(Portugal)	Free	July 2023	

== Pre-season and friendlies ==
Win Draw Loss Fixtures

15 July 2023 Friendly	Santa Clara (Portugal)	1–0	(Portugal) SC Vianense

19 July 2023 Friendly	Santa Clara (Portugal)	1–2	(Portugal) Feirense

22 July 2023 Friendly	Santa Clara (Portugal)	1–0	(Saudi Arabia) Al-Hazem

25 July 2023 Friendly	Santa Clara (Portugal)	2–0	(Portugal) Chaves

== Competitions ==
=== Overall record ===
Competition	First match	Last match	Starting round	Final position	Record							
Competition	First match	Last match	Starting round	Final position	Pld	W	D	L	GF	GA	GD	Win %
Liga Portugal 2	16 August 2023	19 May 2024	Matchday 1		26	16	8	2	37	15	+22	61.54
Taça de Portugal	24 September 2023	29 February 2024	Second round	Quarter-finals	5	1	3	1	6	4	+2	20.00
Taça da Liga	29 July 2023		First round	First round	1	0	1	0	0	0	+0	0.00
Total					32	17	12	3	43	19	+24	53.13

Last updated: 17 March 2024
Source: Soccerway

=== Liga Portugal 2 ===
==== League table ====
Pos	Team	Pld	W	D	L	GF	GA	GD	Pts	Promotion or relegation
1	Santa Clara (C, P)	34	21	10	3	48	19	+29	73	Promotion to Liga Portugal
2	Nacional (P)	34	21	8	5	66	35	+31	71	Promotion to Liga Portugal
3	AVS (O, P)	34	20	4	10	47	31	+16	64 (Note: Ranked on head-to-head: AVS 3–2 Marítimo, Marítimo 0–1 AVS)	Qualification for promotion play-offs
4	Marítimo	34	18	10	6	52	29	+23	64	
5	Paços de Ferreira	34	14	10	10	42	35	+7	52	

Source: Liga Portugal 2
Rules for classification: 1) Points; 2) Head-to-head points; 3) Head-to-head goal difference; 4) Head-to-head away goals scored; 5) Goal difference; 6) Matches won; 7) Goals scored; 8) Play-off.
(C) Champions; (O) Play-off winners; (P) Promoted

==== Results summary ====
Overall								Home						Away					
Pld	W	D	L	GF	GA	GD	Pts	W	D	L	GF	GA	GD	W	D	L	GF	GA	GD
26	16	8	2	37	15	+22	56	9	2	2	20	7	+13	7	6	0	17	8	+9

Last updated: 17 March 2024.
Source: Liga Portugal SABSEG

==== Results by round ====
Round	1
Ground	
Result	
Position	

Updated to match(es) played on November 2023. Source: Liga Portugal SABSEG
A = Away; H = Home; W = Win; D = Draw; L = Loss

==== Matches ====
The league fixtures were unveiled on 5 July 2023.

2 February 2024 20	Vilaverdense	1–1	Santa Clara	Coimbra
18:45				Stadium: Estádio Cidade de Coimbra; Referee: João Afonso

12 February 2024 21	Santa Clara	2–1	Feirense	Ponta Delgada
				Stadium: Estádio de São Miguel

18 February 2024 22	Penafiel	1–2	Santa Clara	Penafiel

24 February 2024 23	Santa Clara	3–0	Oliveirense	Ponta Delgada
				Stadium: Estádio de São Miguel

4 March 2024 24	Académico de Viseu	1–1	Santa Clara	Viseu

9 March 2024 25	Benfica B	0–1	Santa Clara	Seixal
15:30			Klismahn 38'	Stadium: Caixa Futebol Campus; Referee: Márcio Torres

17 March 2024 26	Santa Clara	0–1	Nacional	Ponta Delgada
14:00			Carlos Daniel 13'	Stadium: Estádio de São Miguel

30 March 2024 27	AVS	v	Santa Clara	Vila das Aves
				Stadium: Estádio Clube Desportivo das Aves

=== Taça de Portugal ===
24 September 2023 Second round	Ribeirão	0–3	Santa Clara	Ribeirão
15:00 WET (UTC+1)			Paulo Henrique 54'; Serginho 80'; Miguel Pires 90+4'	Stadium: Estádio do Passal

21 October 2023 Third round	Santa Clara	2–0 (a.e.t.)	SC Vianense	Ponta Delgada
12:00 WET (UTC±0)	Paulo Henrique 100'; Ricardinho 120'			Stadium: Estádio de São Miguel; Referee: Halim Shirzad

26 November 2023 Fourth round	O Elvas	1–1 (a.e.t.) (1–4 p)	Santa Clara	Elvas
11:00 WET (UTC±0)	Medina 115'		Silva 95'	Stadium: Campo Domingos Carrilho Patalino; Referee: Diogo Rosa

29 February 2024 Quarter-final	Santa Clara	1–2	Porto	Ponta Delgada
16:00	Martins 27'		Evanilson 52'; Galeno 61'	Stadium: Estádio de São Miguel
Note: The match started on 7 February but was suspended with 27 minutes played due to pitch flooding. Match was restarted and concluded on 29 February.

=== Taça da Liga ===
29 July 2023 First round	Santa Clara	0–0 (2–4 p)	Tondela	Ponta Delgada
15:30 WEST (UTC+1)				Stadium: Estádio de São Miguel
