= 2022–23 C.D. Santa Clara season =

C.D. Santa Clara
2022–23 season
- President: İsmail Uzun
- Manager: Mário Silva (until 6 January 2023); Jorge Simão (until 25 February 2023); Danildo Accioly (from 26 February 2023)
- Stadium: Estádio de São Miguel
- Primeira Liga: 18th
- Taça de Portugal: Third round
- Taça da Liga: Fifth round
- Top goalscorer: League: Gabriel Silva (5); All: Gabriel Silva (5)
- Highest home attendance: 5,692 v Porto (29 October 2022)
- Lowest home attendance: 157 v Arouca (16 December 2022)
- All statistics correct as of 11 March 2023.

The 2022–23 season is the 96th in the history of C.D. Santa Clara and their fourth consecutive season in the top flight. The club will participate in the Primeira Liga, the Taça de Portugal, and the Taça da Liga.

== Players ==
As of 1 January 2023

Note: Flags indicate national team as defined under FIFA eligibility rules; some limited exceptions apply. Players may hold more than one non-FIFA nationality.

No.	Pos.	Nation	Player
1	GK	POR	Ricardo Fernandes
3	DF	ESP	Xavi Quintillà
4	DF	TOG	Kennedy Boateng
5	DF	POR	João Afonso
6	MF	POR	Bruno Jordão
7	FW	BRA	Allano
8	MF	BRA	Anderson Carvalho
9	FW	JPN	Kyosuke Tagawa (on loan from F.C. Tokyo)
10	MF	POR	Ricardinho
11	MF	POR	Costinha
12	GK	BRA	Gabriel Batista
13	DF	POR	Diogo Calila
14	MF	POR	Rúben Oliveira
15	MF	POR	Rodrigo Valente
16	DF	POR	Paulo Henrique
17	DF	URU	Cristian González
19	FW	POR	Bruno Almeida (on loan from Trofense)

No.	Pos.	Nation	Player
20	MF	BRA	Adriano
21	MF	POR	Andrezinho
22	FW	SRB	Filip Stevanović (on loan from Manchester City)
30	FW	IRI	Mohammad Mohebi
32	DF	BRA	Matheus Nunes (on loan from Vasco da Gama)
35	MF	BRA	Pedro Bicalho (on loan from Palmeiras)
37	MF	BRA	Rildo
39	MF	BRA	Matheus Babi (on loan from Athletico Paranaense)
40	DF	JPN	Kento Misao
41	GK	POR	Ricardo Silva
43	DF	BRA	Paulo Eduardo
44	DF	BRA	Ítalo
49	FW	BRA	Gabriel Silva (on loan from Palmeiras)
77	FW	POR	Rui Costa
80	MF	BRA	Victor Bobsin
90	MF	BRA	Patrick
95	DF	SEN	Pierre Sagna
99	GK	POR	Marco Pereira

=== Out on loan ===
Note: Flags indicate national team as defined under FIFA eligibility rules; some limited exceptions apply. Players may hold more than one non-FIFA nationality.

No.	Pos.	Nation	Player
—	FW	POR	André Mesquita (on loan at Vitória de Setúbal until 30 June 2022)
—	FW	POR	Diogo Motty (on loan at União de Santarém until 30 June 2022)
—	FW	MAR	Mohamed Bouldini (on loan at CF Fuenlabrada until 30 June 2022)

No.	Pos.	Nation	Player
—	FW	HON	Jonathan Toro (on loan at Académica until 30 June 2022)
—	FW	URU	Gustavo Viera (at Fénix until 30 June 2022)
—	MF	POR	Martim Maia (at Trofense until 30 June 2023)

== Transfers ==
=== In ===
==== Summer ====
No.	Pos	Player	Transferred from	Fee	Date	Source
–	DF	(Portugal) Tomás Domingos	(Portugal) Mafra	Free	1 July 2022	
–	GK	(Portugal) Ricardo Silva	(Portugal) Porto B	Free	1 July 2022	
3	DF	(Spain) Xavi Quintillà	(Spain) Villarreal	Free	4 July 2022	
15	MF	(Portugal) Rodrigo Valente	(Portugal) Estoril Praia	Free	4 July 2022	
80	MF	(Brazil) Victor Bobsin	(Brazil) Grêmio	Free	18 July 2022	
21	MF	(Portugal) Andrezinho	(Slovakia) Dunajská Streda	Free	26 July 2022	
43	DF	(Brazil) Paulo Eduardo	(Brazil) Cruzeiro	€1,000,000	6 August 2022	
20	MF	(Brazil) Adriano	(Brazil) Cruzeiro	Free	7 August 2022	
37	AM	(Brazil) Rildo	(Brazil) Grêmio	€1,250,000	9 August 2022	
89	AM	(Brazil) João Marcos	(United Arab Emirates) Al-Wahda	Free	11 August 2022	
6	MF	(Portugal) Martim Maia	(Portugal) Amora	Free transfer	19 August 2022	
13	DF	(Portugal) Diogo Calila	(Portugal) B-SAD	€250,000	19 August 2022	
12	GK	(Brazil) Gabriel Batista	(Brazil) Flamengo	Free	25 August 2022	
44	DF	(Brazil) Ítalo	(Brazil) São Bernardo	Undisclosed	1 September 2022	

==== Winter ====
No.	Pos	Player	Transferred from	Fee	Date	Source
–	DF	(Japan) Kento Misao	(Japan) Kashima Antlers	Undisclosed	1 January 2023	

=== Loans in ===
Date from	Position	Nationality	Name	From	Date until	Team	Ref.
18 July 2022	RW	(Brazil)	Gabriel Silva	(Brazil) Palmeiras	30 June 2023	First team	
18 July 2022	MF	(Brazil)	Pedro Bicalho	(Brazil) Palmeiras	30 June 2023	First team	
10 August 2022	LW	(Portugal)	Bruno Almeida	(Portugal) Trofense	30 June 2023	First team	
22 August 2022	FW	(Brazil)	Matheus Babi	(Brazil) Athletico Paranaense	30 June 2023	First team	
23 August 2022	MF	(Portugal)	Bruno Jordão	(England) Wolverhampton Wanderers	30 June 2023	First team	
24 August 2022	LB	(Brazil)	MT	(Brazil) Vasco da Gama	30 June 2023	First team	
31 August 2022	LW	(Serbia)	Filip Stevanović	(England) Manchester City	30 June 2023	First team	

== Pre-season and friendlies ==
Win Draw Loss Fixtures

14 July 2022 Friendly	Santa Clara (Portugal)	5–6	(Portugal) Vitória de Guimarães B	Amarante
10:00 WEST (UTC+1)

16 July 2022 Friendly	Penafiel (Portugal)	0–0	(Portugal) Santa Clara	Penafiel
10:00 WEST (UTC+1)				Stadium: Estádio Municipal 25 de Abril

16 July 2022 Friendly	Tondela (Portugal)	1–1	(Portugal) Santa Clara	TBD
17:30 WEST (UTC+1)

20 July 2022 Friendly	Paços de Ferreira (Portugal)	1–0	(Portugal) Santa Clara	Paços de Ferreira
18:00 WEST (UTC+1)	Martelo 68'			Stadium: Estádio da Mata Real

23 July 2022 Friendly	Rio Ave (Portugal)	0–2	(Portugal) Santa Clara	Vila do Conde
10:00 WEST (UTC+1)		Report	Mohebi; Oliveira	Stadium: Campo de Treinos do Rio Ave FC

29 July 2022 Friendly	Marítimo (Portugal)	1–0	(Portugal) Santa Clara	Funchal
20:30 WEST (UTC+1)	Matheus Costa 43'			Stadium: Estádio do Marítimo

31 July 2022 Friendly	Nacional (Portugal)	1–2	(Portugal) Santa Clara	Funchal
17:00 WEST (UTC+1)	Vieira 25'		Costa 29' (pen.); Gabriel Silva 48'	Stadium: Estadio da Madeira

== Competitions ==
=== Overall record ===
Competition	First match	Last match	Starting round	Record							
Competition	First match	Last match	Starting round	Pld	W	D	L	GF	GA	GD	Win %
Primeira Liga	7 August 2022	May 2023	Matchday 1	25	3	6	16	17	38	−21	12.00
Taça de Portugal	16 October 2022	16 October 2022	Third round	1	0	0	1	0	2	−2	0.00
Taça da Liga	23 November 2022	16 December 2022	Second round	4	0	1	3	6	9	−3	0.00
Total				30	3	7	20	23	49	−26	10.00

Last updated: 17 March 2023
Source: Soccerway

=== Primeira Liga ===
==== League table ====
Pos	Team	Pld	W	D	L	GF	GA	GD	Pts	Qualification or relegation
14	Estoril	34	10	5	19	33	49	−16	35	
15	Portimonense	34	10	4	20	25	48	−23	34	
16	Marítimo (R)	34	7	5	22	32	63	−31	26	Qualification for the relegation play-offs
17	Paços de Ferreira (R)	34	6	5	23	26	62	−36	23	Relegation to Liga Portugal 2
18	Santa Clara (R)	34	5	7	22	26	58	−32	22	Relegation to Liga Portugal 2

Source: Liga Portugal
Rules for classification: 1) Points; 2) Head-to-head points; 3) Head-to-head goal difference; 4) Goal difference; 5) Matches won; 6) Goals scored; 7) Play-off.
(R) Relegated

==== Results summary ====
Overall								Home						Away					
Pld	W	D	L	GF	GA	GD	Pts	W	D	L	GF	GA	GD	W	D	L	GF	GA	GD
25	3	6	16	17	38	−21	15	2	4	7	13	25	−12	1	2	9	4	13	−9

Last updated: 17 March 2023.
Source: Liga Portugal

==== Results by round ====
Round	1	2	3	4	5	6	7	8	9	10	11	12	13	14	15	16	17	18	19	20	21	22	23	24	25	26	27	28	29	30	31	32	33	34
Ground	H	A	H	A	H	A	H	A	H	A	H	A	H	A	H	A	H	A	H	A	H	A	H	A	H	A	H	A	H	A	H	A	H	A
Result	D	L	L	L	W	L	D	L	L	W	D	D	W	L	L	D	L	L	D	L	L	L	L	L	L									
Position	10	13	14	16	16	16	15	16	16	16	15	15	14	15	15	16	16	16	16	16	16	17	17	18	18									

Updated to match(es) played on 17 March 2023. Source: Liga Portugal
A = Away; H = Home; W = Win; D = Draw; L = Loss

==== Matches ====
The league fixtures were announced on 5 July 2022.

7 August 2022 1	Santa Clara	0–0	Casa Pia	Ponta Delgada
15:30 CEST (UTC+2)		Report		Stadium: Estádio de São Miguel; Referee: Bruno José Costa

14 August 2022 2	Boavista	2–1	Santa Clara	Porto
15:30 CEST (UTC+2)	Ferreira (yellow card) 45+2'; Njie 62', (yellow card) 62', 90+3'; Tavares 66'; Bracali (yellow card) 90+7'	Report	Bruno (yellow card) 23' (yellow-red card) 51'; Bobsin (yellow card) 28'; Rildo 34', (yellow card) 57'; González (yellow card) 40' (yellow-red card) 90+1'; Carvalho (yellow card) 57'	Stadium: Estádio do Bessa; Attendance: 5,520; Referee: Hélder Malheiro

20 August 2022 3	Santa Clara	1–2	Arouca	Ponta Delgada
15:30 CEST (UTC+2)	Ricardinho (yellow card) 29'; Rildo 50'; Marcos (yellow card) 83'	Report	Milovanov (yellow card) 40'; Soro (yellow card) 42'; Rildo 34', (yellow card) 57'; Mújica 61'; Esgaio (yellow card) 71'; João Basso 76' (pen.)	Stadium: Estádio de São Miguel; Attendance: 1,172; Referee: Hélder Carvalho

28 August 2022 4	Famalicão	1–0	Santa Clara	Vila Nova de Famalicao
15:30 CEST (UTC+2)	Youssuf 20'; Kadile (yellow card) 45+2'; Mihaj (yellow card) 84'; Moura (yellow card) 87'	Report	Henrique (yellow card) 15'; Rocha (yellow card) 45+2'; Sagna (yellow card) 68'	Stadium: Estadio Municipal de Famalicao; Attendance: 3,636; Referee: Fábio Veríssimo

4 September 2022 5	Santa Clara	2–1	Marítimo	Ponta Delgada
18:00 CEST (UTC+2)	Eduardo (yellow card) 39'; Allano 52' (pen.); Matheus Babi 60'; Boateng (yellow card) 77'; Carvalho (yellow card) 90+1'	Report	Mendes (yellow card) 15'; Xadas 35'; Joel 42'; Costa (yellow card) 53'; Vidigal (red card) 53'; Mosquera (yellow card) 57'	Stadium: Estádio de São Miguel; Attendance: 1,012; Referee: Gustavo Correia

9 September 2022 6	Vitória de Guimarães	1–0	Santa Clara	Guimarães
20:15 CEST (UTC+2)	Amaro (yellow card) 30'; Silva 48'; Silva (yellow card) 86'; Luz (yellow card) 90'; Silva (yellow card) 90+4'	Report	Bobsin (yellow card) 41'; Boateng (yellow card) 53'; González (yellow card) 67'; Nunes (yellow card) 83'; Henrique (yellow card) 86'	Stadium: Estádio D. Afonso Henriques; Attendance: 12,132; Referee: João Pinheiro

17 September 2022 7	Santa Clara	1–1	Paços Ferreira	Ponta Delgada
15:30 CEST (UTC+2)	Silva 7'; Henrique (yellow card) 13'; Calila (yellow card) 63'; Allano (yellow card) 72'; Carvalho (yellow card) 90+3'	Report	Djaló (yellow card) 41', (goal) 53'; Thomas (yellow card) 57'; Delgado (yellow card) 65'	Stadium: Estádio de São Miguel; Attendance: 2,123; Referee: Rui Costa

2 October 2022 8	Rio Ave	1–0	Santa Clara	Villa do Conde
15:30 CEST (UTC+2)	William (yellow card) 8'; Boateng 15'; Costinha (yellow card) 40'	Report	González (yellow card) 65'; Boateng (red card) 66'; Ricardinho (yellow card) 67'; Matheus Babi (yellow card) 89'	Stadium: Estádio dos Arcos; Attendance: 1,984; Referee: Cláudio Pereira

8 October 2022 9	Santa Clara	1–2	Sporting CP	Ponta Delgada
15:30 CEST (UTC+2)	Bobsin (yellow card) 19'; Ricardinho (yellow card) 67'; Eduardo (yellow card) 72'; Tagawa 90+5'; Allano (yellow card) 90+6'	Report	Santos (yellow card) 65', (goal) 90'; Morita 29'; Adan (yellow card) 79'; Reis (yellow card) 90+6'	Stadium: Estádio de São Miguel; Attendance: 4,447; Referee: Artur Soares Dias

23 October 2022 10	Vizela	0–1	Santa Clara	Vizela
15:30 CEST (UTC+2)	Fernandes (red card) 2'; Kiki (yellow card) 33'; Schmidt (yellow card) 77'	Report	Adriano (yellow card) 20'; Fernandes (yellow card) 73'; González (yellow card) 80'; Almeida 87'; Stevanović (yellow card) 90+2'; Silva (yellow card) 90+2'; Andrezinho (yellow card) 90+4'	Stadium: Estádio do FC Vizela; Attendance: 2,007; Referee: Gustavo Correia

29 October 2022 11	Santa Clara	1–1	Porto	Ponta Delgada
15:30 CEST (UTC+2)	Boateng (yellow card) 14', (goal) 83'; González (yellow card) 17'; Matheus Babi (yellow card) 61'; Bobsin 90+3'	Report	Cardoso 3'; Evanilson (yellow card) 65'	Stadium: Estádio de São Miguel; Attendance: 5,692; Referee: Artur Soares Dias

7 November 2022 12	Chaves	0–0	Santa Clara	Chaves
20:15 CET (UTC+1)	Cruz (yellow card) 7'; Ponck (yellow card) 64'; Singh (yellow card) 77'; Monte (yellow card) 90+3'	Report	Gabriel (yellow card) 1'; Adriano (yellow card) 74'; Carvalho (yellow card) 86'; Matheus Babi (yellow card) 90+2'	Stadium: Estadio Municipal de Chaves; Attendance: 2,224; Referee: Rui Costa

14 November 2022 13	Santa Clara	3–1	Estoril Praia	Ponta Delgada
19:15 AZOT (UTC−01:00)	González 23'; Matheus Babi 43'; Gabriel (yellow card) 45+1'; Adriano (yellow card) 65'; Boateng 70', (yellow card) 83'	Report	Léa 18', (yellow card) 22'	Stadium: Estádio de São Miguel; Attendance: 747; Referee: André Narciso

29 December 2022 14	Gil Vicente	1–0	Santa Clara	Barcelos
17:00 CET (UTC+1)	Navarro (yellow card) 6'; Murilo 42'; Ferrugem (yellow card) 63'; Kritsyuk (yellow card) 90+1'	Report	Sagna (yellow card) 7'; Ricardinho (yellow card) 89'	Stadium: Estádio Cidade de Barcelos; Attendance: 2,839; Referee: João Goncalves

5 January 2023 15	Santa Clara	0–4	Braga	Ponta Delgada
20:15 AZOT (UTC−01:00)	Bobsin (yellow card) 87'	Report	Horta 15', 53', 80'; Medeiros 16'; Vitinha (yellow card) 82'	Stadium: Estádio de São Miguel; Attendance: 1,591; Referee: Miguel Nogueira

13 January 2023 16	Portimonense	0–0	Santa Clara	Portimão
20:15 CET (UTC+1)	Cariello (yellow card) 24'; Seck (yellow card) 79'	Report	Adriano (yellow card) 11'; Sagna (yellow card) 24' (yellow-red card) 28'; Babi (yellow card) 32'; Gabriel (yellow card) 86'	Stadium: Estádio Municipal de Portimão; Attendance: 762; Referee: Rui Costa

21 January 2023 17	Santa Clara	0–3	Benfica	Ponta Delgada
17:00 AZOT (UTC−01:00)	Ítalo (yellow card) 30'	Report	Aursnes 9', (yellow card) 50'; Ramos 16'; Morato (yellow card) 53'; Guedes 80'	Stadium: Estádio de São Miguel; Attendance: 9,701; Referee: Fábio Veríssimo (Leiria)

29 January 2023 18	Casa Pia	2–1	Santa Clara	Lisbon
15:30 CET (UTC+1)	Saviour (yellow card) 6'; Kunimoto (yellow card) 12'; Rafael (yellow card) 35'; Soares (yellow card) 42'; Yuki 75'; Baró (yellow card) 78'	Report	Bobsin (yellow card) 70'; Gabriel 82' (pen.); Adriano (yellow card) 90+3'; Babi (yellow card) 90+5'; Henrique (yellow card) 90+7'	Stadium: Estádio Pina Manique; Attendance: 1,003; Referee: Gustavo Correia

4 February 2023 19	Santa Clara	2–2	Boavista	Ponta Delgada
14:30 AZOT (UTC−01:00)	Allano (yellow card) 12'; Calila (yellow card) 38'; Silva 60', 86'	Report	Sasso 13', 64'; Onyemaechi (yellow card) 23'; Camará (yellow card) 72'; Mangas (yellow card) 72'	Stadium: Estádio de São Miguel; Attendance: 1,680; Referee: Vitor Ferreira

11 February 2023 20	Arouca	1–0	Santa Clara	Arouca
18:00 CET (UTC+1)	Soro (yellow card) 40'; Ruiz 49'; Arruabarrena (yellow card) 85'	Report	Bobsin (yellow card) 9'; Costinha (yellow card) 30'; Misao (yellow card) 87'; Quintilla (yellow card) 90+5'	Stadium: Estádio Municipal de Arouca; Attendance: 857; Referee: Hélder Carvalho

19 February 2023 21	Santa Clara	1–3	Famalicão	Ponta Delgada
14:30 AZOT (UTC−01:00)	Adriano (yellow card) 24'; Gabriel 34'; Xavi 74', (yellow card) 75'; Nogueira (red card) 76'	Report	Youssouf (yellow card) 19'; Moura (yellow card) 33'; Jaime 48'; Cádiz (red card) 76'; Eduardo 82' (o.g.); Penetra 90+4'; Sanca (yellow card) 90+5'	Stadium: Estádio de São Miguel; Attendance: 1,618; Referee: André Narciso

25 February 2023 22	Marítimo	3–1	Santa Clara	Funchal
18:00 GMT	Zainadine (yellow card) 32'; Costa (yellow card) 34'; Boateng 61' (o.g.); Winck 21' (pen.); Liza 78'; Mosquera (yellow card) 84'	Report	Silva 18'; Boateng (yellow card) 20'; Almeida (yellow card) 21'; Batista (yellow card) 29'; Misao (yellow card) 69'; Xavi (yellow card) 70'	Stadium: Estádio do Marítimo; Attendance: 9,312; Referee: Artur Soares Dias

5 March 2023 23	Santa Clara	1–3	Vitória de Guimarães	Ponta Delgada
17:00 AZOT (UTC−01:00)	Misao (yellow card) 33'; Rildo 66'; Costinha (yellow card) 90+1'; González (yellow card) 90+9'	Report	Safira 22', 30'; Silva 44'; Oliveira (yellow card) 90+8'	Stadium: Estádio de São Miguel; Attendance: 1,598; Referee: Manuel Mota

11 March 2023 24	Paços de Ferreira	1–0	Santa Clara	Paços de Ferreira
15:30 GMT	Pires (yellow card) 45+2'; Antunes 54'; Gaitán (yellow card) 59'; Marafona (yellow card) 66'; Thomas (yellow card) 73'; Maracás (yellow card) 80'	Report	Rildo (yellow card) 36'; Jordão (yellow card) 51'; Henrique (yellow card) 62'; Nunes (yellow card) 64'; Bobsin (yellow card) 71'; Allano (yellow card) 73'	Stadium: Estádio da Mata Real; Attendance: 3,635; Referee: António Nobre

17 March 2023 25	Santa Clara	0–2	Rio Ave	Ponta Delgada
19:15 AZOT (UTC−01:00)	Diogo Calila (yellow card) 41'; González (yellow card) 45+1'; Almeida (yellow card) 69'; Jordão (yellow card) 75'	Report	Santos (yellow card) 45+3'; Ítalo 51' (o.g.); Ruiz 73', (yellow card) 84'	Stadium: Estádio de São Miguel; Attendance: 912; Referee: Gustavo Correia

=== Taça de Portugal ===
16 October 2022 Third Round	Tondela	2–0	Santa Clara	Tondela
21:00 CEST (UTC+2)	Barbosa 38'; Fonseca 90+1'		Allano 5'; Adriano (yellow card) 61'	Stadium: Estádio João Cardoso; Referee: João Pinheiro

=== Taça da Liga ===
==== Third round ====
Pos	Team	Pld	W	D	L	GF	GA	GD	Pts	Qualification	ARO	FEI	LEI	OLI	SAN
1	Arouca	4	2	2	0	7	3	+4	8	Advance to knockout phase	—	1–1	1–1	—	—
2	Feirense	4	2	2	0	7	5	+2	8		—	—	2–1	—	4–3
3	Leixões	4	2	1	1	6	5	+1	7		—	—	—	2–1	2–1
4	Oliveirense	4	0	2	2	2	6	−4	2		0–3	0–0	—	—	—
5	Santa Clara	4	0	1	3	6	9	−3	1		1–2	—	—	1–1	—

Source: Liga Portugal
Rules for classification: Tiebreakers

23 November 2022 Second Round	Leixões	2–1	Santa Clara	Matosinhos
20:45 CET (UTC+1)	Valente (yellow card) 33'; Thalis 51', (yellow card) 58'; Amorim (yellow card) 55'; Fabinho 59'; Rafael (yellow card) 84'		Rildo 18', (yellow card) 41'; González (red card) 30'; Eduardo (yellow card) 56'	Stadium: Estádio do Mar; Attendance: 1,327; Referee: António Nobre

29 November 2022 Third Round	Santa Clara	1–1	Oliveirense	Ponta Delgada
20:45 CET (UTC+1)	Bobsin (yellow card) 77'; Ricardinho 90'; Sagna (yellow card) 90+5'		Jaime 62'; Ibrahima (yellow card) 90+4'	Stadium: Estádio de São Miguel; Referee: Hélder Carvalho

8 December 2022 Fourth Round	Feirense	4–3	Santa Clara	Santa Maria da Feira
16:30 CET (UTC+1)	Jardel 7'; Oliveira 55'; Luiz 58'; Rodrigues 88', (yellow card) 88'		Rildo (yellow card) 6', (goal) 45+1' (pen.); Ricardinho 19'; Quintillà (yellow card) 60'; Bobsin (yellow card) 63'; Boateng 80'; Matheus Babi (yellow card) 85'; Sagna (yellow card) 87'; Allano (red card) 90+2'	Stadium: Estadio Marcolino de Castro; Attendance: 1,144; Referee: Carlos Macedo

16 December 2022 Fifth Round	Santa Clara	1–2	Arouca	Ponta Delgada
18:30 CET (UTC+1)	Pedro Bicalho (yellow card) 10'; Matheus Babi (yellow card) 35', (goal) 56'; Adriano (yellow card) 90+4'		Opoko (yellow card) 23' (yellow-red card) 50', (goal) 30'; Simao (yellow card) 50' (yellow-red card) 73'; Dabbagh 87', (yellow card) 88'	Stadium: Estádio de São Miguel; Attendance: 157; Referee: Ricardo Baixinho
