= 2022–23 Taça da Liga =

Football competition

Allianz Cup

Tournament details
- Country: Portugal
- Dates: 17 November 2022 – 28 January 2023
- Teams: 34

Final positions
- Champions: Porto (1st title)
- Runners-up: Sporting CP

Tournament statistics
- Matches played: 63
- Goals scored: 166 (2.63 per match)
- Attendance: 257,646 (4,090 per match)
- Top goal scorer: Paulinho (8 goals)

The 2022–23 Taça da Liga was the sixteenth edition of the Taça da Liga (also known as Allianz Cup for sponsorship reasons), a football league cup competition organised by the Liga Portuguesa de Futebol Profissional and contested exclusively by clubs competing in the top two professional tiers of Portuguese football – the Primeira Liga and the Liga Portugal 2.

This edition introduced a new format in which all teams entered the competition in a single group stage, with matches beginning on 17 November 2022 and played during the 2022 FIFA World Cup. The eight group winners advanced to a knockout phase comprising quarter-finals, semi-finals and the final, which was played at the Estádio Dr. Magalhães Pessoa in Leiria on 28 January 2023.

Sporting CP were the holders and four-time winners, after defeating Benfica 2–1 in the 2022 final. They reached their third consecutive final but were defeated 2–0 by Porto, who secured their first title in the competition after losing four previous finals.

== Group stage ==
All times are Western European Time (WET, UTC+0).

=== Group A ===
Pos	Team	Pld	W	D	L	GF	GA	GD	Pts	
1	Porto	3	2	1	0	8	2	+6	7	Advance to the quarter-finals
2	Mafra	3	1	2	0	5	4	+1	5	
3	Vizela	3	0	2	1	3	7	−4	2	
4	Chaves	3	0	1	2	3	6	−3	1	

Source: Soccerway
22 November 2022
20:45

Vizela	2–2	Chaves
Etim 35'; Guzzo 75'	Report	Singh 33'; Issah 90+3'

Estádio do Futebol Clube de Vizela, Vizela
Attendance: 1,490
Referee: Carlos Macedo

25 November 2022
20:45

Porto	2–2	Mafra
Pepê 48'; Martínez 70'	Report	Fati 16'; Ferreira 42' (pen.)

Estádio do Dragão, Porto
Attendance: 22,217
Referee: Miguel Nogueira

5 December 2022
20:45

Mafra	1–1	Vizela
Diomande 9'	Report	Wilson 70'

Estádio Municipal de Mafra, Mafra
Attendance: 520
Referee: João Gonçalves

8 December 2022
19:00

Chaves	0–2	Porto
	Report	Loader 55', 59'

Estádio Municipal de Chaves, Chaves
Attendance: 5,360
Referee: Cláudio Pereira

16 December 2022
20:30

Chaves	1–2	Mafra
Jô 84'	Report	Almeida 64', 77'

Estádio Municipal de Chaves, Chaves
Attendance: 445
Referee: Hélder Carvalho

16 December 2022
20:30

Porto	4–0	Vizela
Martínez 1'; Galeno 48'; Wendell 58'; Taremi 67' (pen.)	Report

Estádio do Dragão, Porto
Attendance: 21,929
Referee: Vítor Ferreira

=== Group B ===
Pos	Team	Pld	W	D	L	GF	GA	GD	Pts	
1	Sporting CP	3	3	0	0	13	0	+13	9	Advance to the quarter-finals
2	Rio Ave	3	2	0	1	3	3	0	6	
3	Farense	3	1	0	2	3	8	−5	3	
4	Marítimo	3	0	0	3	0	8	−8	0	

Source: Soccerway
30 November 2022
20:45

Sporting CP	6–0	Farense
Paulinho 20', 22'; Edwards 39'; Gonçalves 48'; Gomes 75'; Fernandes 85' (pen.)	Report

Estádio José Alvalade, Lisbon
Attendance: 17,008
Referee: Nuno Almeida

1 December 2022
17:00

Marítimo	0–1	Rio Ave
	Report	Santos 90'

Estádio do Marítimo, Funchal
Attendance: 2,752
Referee: Carlos Macedo

7 December 2022
18:30

Farense	2–0	Marítimo
P. Henrique 23', 84'	Report

Estádio de São Luís, Faro
Attendance: 881
Referee: Hélder Malheiro

7 December 2022
20:30

Rio Ave	0–2	Sporting CP
	Report	Inácio 63'; Boateng 72' (o.g.)

Estádio dos Arcos, Vila do Conde
Attendance: 2,622
Referee: Miguel Nogueira

13 December 2022
20:45

Sporting CP	5–0	Marítimo
Paulinho 1', 15', 31'; Porro 73'; Silva 86' (o.g.)	Report

Estádio José Alvalade, Lisbon
Attendance: 0
Referee: André Narciso

13 December 2022
20:45

Rio Ave	2–1	Farense
Yakubu 32', 73'	Report	Muscat 62'

Estádio dos Arcos, Vila do Conde
Attendance: 394
Referee: Manuel Oliveira

=== Group C ===
Pos	Team	Pld	W	D	L	GF	GA	GD	Pts	
1	Moreirense	3	2	1	0	7	4	+3	7	Advance to the quarter-finals
2	Benfica	3	2	1	0	6	3	+3	7	
3	Estrela da Amadora	3	0	1	2	5	8	−3	1	
4	Penafiel	3	0	1	2	2	5	−3	1	

Source: Soccerway
17 November 2022
20:30

Penafiel	1–2	Moreirense
Rodrigo 31'	Report	Petkov 80'; A. Luis 89'

Estádio Municipal 25 de Abril, Penafiel
Attendance: 393
Referee: David Silva

20 November 2022
19:00

Estrela da Amadora	2–3	Benfica
Silva 21'; G. Henrique 90+5'	Report	Musa 12'; Chiquinho 28'; Draxler 90'

Estádio Dr. Magalhães Pessoa, Leiria
Attendance: 6,899
Referee: Miguel Nogueira

26 November 2022
20:45

Benfica	2–0	Penafiel
Gilberto 55'; Neres 56'	Report

Estádio da Luz, Lisbon
Attendance: 43,263
Referee: André Narciso

27 November 2022
17:00

Moreirense	4–2	Estrela da Amadora
Franco 32'; Pacheco 45'; Alan 69'; Kodisang 83'	Report	Salomão 26'; Ndo 77'

Parque de Jogos Comendador Joaquim de Almeida Freitas, Moreira de Cónegos
Attendance: 786
Referee: Anzhony Rodrigues

17 December 2022
19:00

Moreirense	1–1	Benfica
A. Luis 24'	Report	Ramos 43'

Parque de Jogos Comendador Joaquim de Almeida Freitas, Moreira de Cónegos
Attendance: 4,339
Referee: Tiago Martins

17 December 2022
19:00

Estrela da Amadora	1–1	Penafiel
Ndo 69'	Report	Semedo 90+6'

Estádio Dr. Magalhães Pessoa, Leiria
Attendance: 108
Referee: João Pinho

=== Group D ===
Pos	Team	Pld	W	D	L	GF	GA	GD	Pts	
1	Braga	3	3	0	0	6	0	+6	9	Advance to the quarter-finals
2	Casa Pia	3	1	1	1	2	2	0	4	
3	Paços de Ferreira	3	0	2	1	2	4	−2	2	
4	Trofense	3	0	1	2	1	5	−4	1	

Source: Soccerway
20 November 2022
18:45

Braga	3–0	Trofense
Banza 16'; Al-Musrati 42'; Hernâni 90+4'	Report

Estádio Municipal de Braga, Braga
Attendance: 6,244
Referee: Ricardo Baixinho

20 November 2022
20:15

Paços de Ferreira	1–1	Casa Pia
Antunes 40'	Report	Varela 47'

Estádio da Mata Real, Paços de Ferreira
Attendance: 655
Referee: Claúdio Pereira

3 December 2022
17:00

Casa Pia	0–1	Braga
	Report	Vitinha 23'

Estádio Nacional, Oeiras
Attendance: 763
Referee: Fábio Veríssimo

3 December 2022
20:45

Trofense	1–1	Paços de Ferreira
Maïga 27'	Report	Valente 56' (o.g.)

Estádio do CD Trofense, Trofa
Attendance: 537
Referee: Gustavo Correia

11 December 2022
15:00

Casa Pia	1–0	Trofense
Antoine 16'	Report

Estádio Nacional, Oeiras
Attendance: 185
Referee: Luís Godinho

11 December 2022
19:00

Braga	2–0	Paços de Ferreira
Djaló 42'; Ruiz 45'	Report

Estádio Municipal de Braga, Braga
Attendance: 4,998
Referee: Rui Costa

=== Group E ===
Pos	Team	Pld	W	D	L	GF	GA	GD	Pts	
1	Gil Vicente	3	2	1	0	7	2	+5	7	Advance to the quarter-finals
2	Nacional	3	2	0	1	4	3	+1	6	
3	Portimonense	3	1	0	2	2	5	−3	3	
4	Sporting de Covilhã	3	0	1	2	3	6	−3	1	

Source: Soccerway
19 November 2022
15:30

Nacional	2–0	Portimonense
Zé Manuel 50', 53'	Report

Estádio da Madeira, Funchal
Attendance: 497
Referee: Manuel Oliveira

20 November 2022
18:45

Sporting de Covilhã	2–2	Gil Vicente
Vilanculos 65'; Cornélio 68'	Report	Navarro 17'; Alipour 90+4'

Estádio Municipal José dos Santos Pinto, Covilhã
Attendance: 287
Referee: Hélder Carvalho

27 November 2022
11:00

Portimonense	2–0	Sporting de Covilhã
Matos 7'; Oliveira 76'	Report

Estádio Municipal de Portimão, Portimão
Attendance: 340
Referee: João Gonçalves

27 November 2022
15:00

Gil Vicente	2–0	Nacional
Carvalho 4'; Barros 16'	Report

Estádio Cidade de Barcelos, Barcelos
Attendance: 914
Referee: Rui Costa

14 December 2022
20:45

Portimonense	0–3	Gil Vicente
	Report	Cunha 45'; Fujimoto 62'; Navarro 86'

Estádio Municipal de Portimão, Portimão
Attendance: 213
Referee: António Nobre

14 December 2022
20:45

Sporting de Covilhã	1–2	Nacional
Vilanculos 65'	Report	Vieira 52'; Gomes 87'

Estádio Municipal José dos Santos Pinto, Covilhã
Attendance: 94
Referee: Diogo Rosa

=== Group F ===
Pos	Team	Pld	W	D	L	GF	GA	GD	Pts	
1	Boavista	3	2	1	0	4	2	+2	7	Advance to the quarter-finals
2	Vitória de Guimarães	3	0	3	0	2	2	0	3	
3	B-SAD	3	0	2	1	4	5	−1	2	
4	Vilafranquense	3	0	2	1	0	1	−1	2	

Source: Soccerway
18 November 2022
20:30

B-SAD	2–3	Boavista
Pacheco 20'; Saramago 24'	Report	Mangas 37'; Gorré 50'; Lourenço 58'

Estádio Nacional, Oeiras
Attendance: 161
Referee: João Gonçalves

19 November 2022
20:30

Vilafranquense	0–0	Vitória de Guimarães
	Report

Estádio Municipal de Rio Maior, Rio Maior
Attendance: 333
Referee: André Narciso

27 November 2022
20:45

Boavista	1–0	Vilafranquense
Njie 79'	Report

Estádio do Bessa, Porto
Attendance: 1,215
Referee: Manuel Mota

1 December 2022
20:45

Vitória de Guimarães	2–2	B-SAD
A. Silva 14'; J. Silva 36'	Report	Henriques 30'; Teixeira 45'

Estádio D. Afonso Henriques, Guimarães
Attendance: 6,520
Referee: Vítor Ferreira

11 December 2022
11:00

Vilafranquense	0–0	B-SAD
	Report

Estádio Municipal de Rio Maior, Rio Maior
Attendance: 27
Referee: Hugo Silva

12 December 2022
20:30

Boavista	0–0	Vitória de Guimarães
	Report

Estádio do Bessa, Porto
Attendance: 2,884
Referee: Carlos Macedo

=== Group G ===
Pos	Team	Pld	W	D	L	GF	GA	GD	Pts	
1	Arouca	4	2	2	0	7	3	+4	8	Advance to the quarter-finals
2	Feirense	4	2	2	0	7	5	+2	8	
3	Leixões	4	2	1	1	6	5	+1	7	
4	Oliveirense	4	0	2	2	2	6	−4	2	
5	Santa Clara	4	0	1	3	6	9	−3	1	

Source: Soccerway
18 November 2022
18:00

Arouca	1–1	Feirense
Mújica 34'	Report	Teles 48'

Estádio Municipal de Arouca, Arouca
Attendance: 821
Referee: Vítor Ferreira

19 November 2022
11:00

Leixões	2–1	Oliveirense
Brunão 14'; Eduardo 90+2'	Report	Serginho 52'

Estádio do Mar, Matosinhos
Attendance: 0
Referee: Iancu Vasilica

23 November 2022
20:45

Leixões	2–1	Santa Clara
Thalis 51'; Fabinho 59'	Report	Rildo 18'

Estádio do Mar, Matosinhos
Attendance: 1,327
Referee: António Nobre

26 November 2022
11:00

Oliveirense	0–0	Feirense
	Report

Estádio Carlos Osório, Oliveira de Azeméis
Attendance: 487
Referee: João Pinheiro

29 November 2022
19:45

Santa Clara	1–1	Oliveirense
Ricardinho 90'	Report	Jaiminho 62'

Estádio de São Miguel, Ponta Delgada
Attendance: 456
Referee: Hélder Carvalho

4 December 2022
17:00

Arouca	1–1	Leixões
Dabbagh 8'	Report	Silva 77'

Estádio Municipal de Arouca, Arouca
Attendance: 1,049
Referee: Tiago Martins

8 December 2022
16:30

Feirense	4–3	Santa Clara
Jardel 7'; Oliveira 55'; Teixeira 58'; Rodrigues 88'	Report	Ricardinho 19'; Rildo 45+1'; Boateng 80'

Estádio Marcolino de Castro, Santa Maria da Feira
Attendance: 1,144
Referee: Carlos Macedo

10 December 2022
20:45

Oliveirense	0–3	Arouca
	Report	Ruiz 5'; Mújica 69'; Bukia 83'

Estádio Carlos Osório, Oliveira de Azeméis
Attendance: 158
Referee: Manuel Mota

16 December 2022
17:30

Santa Clara	1–2	Arouca
Babi 56'	Report	Opoku 30'; Dabbagh 87'

Estádio de São Miguel, Ponta Delgada
Attendance: 157
Referee: Ricardo Baixinho
16 December 2022
18:30

Feirense	2–1	Leixões
Rodrigues 63'; Jardel 90+6'	Report	Erivaldo 54'

Estádio Marcolino de Castro, Santa Maria da Feira
Attendance: 773
Referee: João Gonçalves

=== Group H ===
Pos	Team	Pld	W	D	L	GF	GA	GD	Pts	
1	Académico de Viseu	4	2	2	0	9	5	+4	8	Advance to the quarter-finals
2	Torreense	4	1	3	0	5	4	+1	6	
3	Famalicão	4	1	2	1	2	2	0	5	
4	Tondela	4	0	3	1	2	5	−3	3	
5	Estoril	4	0	2	2	4	6	−2	2	

Source: Soccerway
19 November 2022
18:00

Tondela	0–0	Estoril
	Report

Estádio João Cardoso, Tondela
Attendance: 577
Referee: Hélder Malheiro

20 November 2022
11:00

Torreense	1–1	Académico de Viseu
Rocha 46'	Report	Yuri 15'

Estádio Manuel Marques, Torres Vedras
Attendance: 273
Referee: Bruno Vieira

24 November 2022
20:45

Tondela	1–1	Torreense
Arcanjo 26'	Report	Maciel 66'

Estádio João Cardoso, Tondela
Attendance: 352
Referee: Flávio Lima

26 November 2022
15:00

Famalicão	1–1	Académico de Viseu
Cádiz 60'	Report	Clóvis 17'

Estádio Municipal 22 de Junho, Vila Nova de Famalicão
Attendance: 2,399
Referee: Manuel Oliveira

1 December 2022
12:45

Académico de Viseu	3–2	Estoril
Quizera 30', 76'; Toro 68'	Report	Marqués 8', 41'

Estádio do Fontelo, Viseu
Attendance: 829
Referee: Ricardo Baixinho

2 December 2022
20:45

Torreense	1–0	Famalicão
Vieira 50'	Report

Estádio Manuel Marques, Torres Vedras
Attendance: 355
Referee: Luís Godinho

6 December 2022
20:45

Estoril	2–2	Torreense
Carvalho 35'; Erison 87'	Report	Picas 6'; Oliveira 25'

Estádio António Coimbra da Mota, Estoril
Attendance: 314
Referee: Hélder Carvalho

9 December 2022
20:45

Famalicão	0–0	Tondela
	Report

Estádio Municipal 22 de Junho, Vila Nova de Famalicão
Attendance: 1,287
Referee: Gustavo Correia

15 December 2022
20:00

Académico de Viseu	4–1	Tondela
Messeguem 21', 45'; Bandeira 73'; Clóvis 83'	Report	Bebeto 79'

Estádio do Fontelo, Viseu
Attendance: 1,697
Referee: Marcos Brazão
15 December 2022
20:00

Estoril	0–1	Famalicão
	Report	Colombatto 9'

Estádio António Coimbra da Mota, Estoril
Attendance: 435
Referee: Fábio Veríssimo

== Knockout phase ==
All times are Western European Time (WET, UTC+0).

=== Bracket ===
Quarter-finals
22 December 2022 – Moreira de Cónegos
Moreirense	1
Arouca	2
19 December 2022 – Lisbon
Sporting CP	5
Braga	0
21 December 2022 – Porto
Porto	2
Gil Vicente	0
20 December 2022 – Viseu
Académico de Viseu	2
Boavista	1

Semi-finals
24 January 2023 – Leiria
Arouca	1
Sporting CP	2
25 January 2023 – Leiria
Porto	3
Académico de Viseu	0

Final
28 January 2023 – Leiria
Sporting CP	0
Porto	2

=== Quarter-finals ===
19 December 2022
20:15

Sporting CP	5–0	Braga
Inácio 4'; Paulinho 7'; Gonçalves 20' (pen.); Trincão 41'; Edwards 45+4' (pen.)	Report

Estádio José Alvalade, Lisbon
Attendance: 20,396
Referee: Luís Godinho

20 December 2022
20:15

Académico de Viseu	2–1	Boavista
Nduwarugira 56'; Bandeira 62'	Report	Onyemaechi 90+6'

Estádio do Fontelo, Viseu
Attendance: 2,009
Referee: João Pinheiro

21 December 2022
20:15

Porto	2–0	Gil Vicente
Galeno 3'; Taremi 68'	Report

Estádio do Dragão, Porto
Attendance: 21,813
Referee: Manuel Mota

22 December 2022
20:15

Moreirense	1–2	Arouca
Luis 44' (pen.)	Report	Esgaio 70'; Mujica 79'

Parque de Jogos Comendador Joaquim de Almeida Freitas, Moreira de Cónegos
Attendance: 1,167
Referee: Nuno Almeida

=== Semi-finals ===
24 January 2023
19:45

Arouca	1–2	Sporting CP
Dabbagh 58'	Report	Paulinho 45+7', 82'

Estádio Dr. Magalhães Pessoa, Leiria
Attendance: 10,259
Referee: Fábio Veríssimo

25 January 2023
19:45

Porto	3–0	Académico de Viseu
Eustáquio 7'; Namaso 66'; Folha 79'	Report

Estádio Dr. Magalhães Pessoa, Leiria
Attendance: 9,576
Referee: Rui Manuel Gomes Costa

=== Final ===
28 January 2023
19:45

Sporting CP	0–2	Porto
	Report	Eustáquio 10'; Marcano 86'

Estádio Dr. Magalhães Pessoa, Leiria
Attendance: 19,263
Referee: João Pinheiro
