= N'Do =

N'Do is a surname. Notable people with the surname include:

- Joseph N'Do (born 1976), Cameroonian footballer
- Régis N'do (born 2001), Ivorian footballer
