= Estádio de São Miguel =

Estádio de São Miguel may mean:

- Estádio de São Miguel (Ponta Delgada), Portugal
- Estádio de São Miguel (Gondomar), Portugal
