= MT (footballer) =

Brazilian footballer (born 2001)

Matheus Araújo
Personal information
- Full name: Matheus Nunes Fagundes de Araújo
- Date of birth: 1 March 2001 (age 25)
- Place of birth: Cabo Frio, Brazil
- Height: 1.85 m (6 ft 1 in)
- Positions: Left-back; centre-back

Team information
- Current team: Santa Clara
- Number: 32

Youth career
- 2018–2019: Volta Redonda
- 2019–2021: Vasco da Gama

Senior career*
Years	Team	Apps	(Gls)
2021–2024	Vasco da Gama	22	(1)
2022–2024	→ Santa Clara (loan)	41	(0)
2024–	Santa Clara	44	(2)
- * Club domestic league appearances and goals as of 21 December 2025

Matheus Nunes Fagundes de Araújo (born 1 March 2001), better known as MT or Matheus Araújo, is a Brazilian professional footballer who plays as a left-back or centre-back for Primeira Liga club Santa Clara.

== Club career ==
MT is a youth product of Volta Redonda, and moved over to the youth academy of Vasco da Gama in 2019. He was transferred to Vasco da Gama's senior team on 18 May 2021, signing a contract until 2023. He made his professional debut with Vasco da Gama in a 1–1 Copa do Brasil tie with Caldense on 18 March 2021. On 8 August 2022, he joined the Portuguese Primeira Liga club Santa Clara on a season-long loan with an option to buy. On 16 June 2023, MT's loan to Santa Clara was extended for a further season. On 27 June 2024, Santa Clara and MT made the deal permanent and give him a 4-year contract.

== Career statistics ==
As of match played 21 December 2025.

Appearances and goals by club, season and competition
Club	Season	League			National cup		League cup		Continental		Other		Total	
Club	Season	Division	Apps	Goals	Apps	Goals	Apps	Goals	Apps	Goals	Apps	Goals	Apps	Goals
Vasco da Gama	2021	Série B	20	1	1	0	—		—		4 (Note: Appearances in the Taça Guanabara)	1	25	2
Vasco da Gama	2022	Série B	2	0	0	0	—		0	0	2	0	4	0
Vasco da Gama	Total		22	1	1	0	—		0	0	6	1	29	2
Santa Clara (loan)	2022–23	Primeira Liga	20	0	1	0	2	0	—		—		20	0
Santa Clara (loan)	2023–24	Liga Portugal 2	21	0	2	0	1	0	—		—		24	0
Santa Clara (loan)	Total		41	0	3	0	3	0	—		—		44	0
Santa Clara	2024–25	Primeira Liga	33	1	1	0	1	0	—		—		35	1
Santa Clara	2025–26	Primeira Liga	11	1	1	0	0	0	6 (Note: Appearances in UEFA Conference League)	0	—		18	1
Santa Clara	Total		44	2	2	0	1	0	6	0	—		53	2
Career total			107	3	5	0	4	0	6	0	6	1	128	3
