= Gonçalo Pinto =

Portuguese footballer

Personal information
- Full name: Gonçalo Filipe Jesus Pinto
- Date of birth: 30 April 2000 (age 26)
- Place of birth: Almada, Portugal
- Height: 1.94 m (6 ft 4 in)
- Position: Goalkeeper

Team information
- Current team: Vitória de Setúbal
- Number: 1

Youth career
- 2008–2010: GC Corroios
- 2010–2014: Sporting CP
- 2014–2016: Almada
- 2016–2017: Belenenses
- 2017: Cova da Piedade
- 2017–2019: Sporting CP

Senior career*
Years	Team	Apps	(Gls)
2020–2022	Sporting CP B	5	(0)
2020–2021	→ União Santarém (loan)	15	(0)
2022–2025	Chaves	2	(0)
2022	→ Pedras Salgadas (loan)	10	(0)
2025–2026	Os Belenenses	0	(0)
2026–	Vitória de Setúbal	3	(0)

International career
2018	Portugal U19	1	(0)
- * Club domestic league appearances and goals as of 13 September 2026

Gonçalo Filipe Jesus Pinto (born 30 April 2000) is a Portuguese professional footballer who plays as a goalkeeper for Campeonato de Portugal club Vitória de Setúbal.

== Career ==
Pinto is a youth product of the academies of GC Corroios, Sporting CP, Almada, Belenenses, and Cova da Piedade. He signed his first professional contract with Sporting CP B in July 2020, and shortly after joined União Santarém on loan for the 2020–21 season in the Campeonato de Portugal. He was the backup goalkeeper for Sporting CP B in the 2021–22 season. On 18 August 2022, he transferred to the Primeira Liga club Chaves. He spent the first half of the 2022–23 season on loan with Pedras Salgadas. He returned to Chaves in December 2022 and made his professional debut with them in a 2–1 Taça da Liga loss to Mafra on 16 December 2022.

== International career ==
Pinto is a youth international for Portugal, having made one appearance for the Portugal U19s.
