= Ricardinho (footballer, born 1998) =

Brazilian footballer (born 1998)

Personal information
- Full name: Ricardo Jorge Oliveira António
- Date of birth: 6 August 1998 (age 28)
- Place of birth: Santa Maria da Feira, Portugal
- Height: 1.67 m (5 ft 6 in)
- Positions: Winger; attacking midfielder

Team information
- Current team: Juárez
- Number: 21

Youth career
- 2006–2014: Porto
- 2013–2014: → Padroense (loan)
- 2014–2017: Rio Ave

Senior career*
Years	Team	Apps	(Gls)
2017–2019	Rio Ave B	55	(10)
2019–2025	Santa Clara	117	(12)
2019–2020	→ Praiense (loan)	16	(4)
2020–2021	→ Torreense (loan)	24	(7)
2025–	Juárez	30	(1)
- * Club domestic league appearances and goals as of 27 September 2026

Ricardo Jorge Oliveira António (born 6 August 1998), known as Ricardinho, is a Portuguese professional footballer who plays as a winger or attacking midfielder for Liga MX club Juárez.

== Club career ==
Born in Santa Maria da Feira, Aveiro District, Ricardinho played youth football with Porto and Rio Ave, starting his senior career with the latter's under-23 and reserve teams. He joined Santa Clara in 2019, and shortly after went on successive loans with third division clubs Praiense and Torreense.

Ricardinho returned to the Estádio de São Miguel for the 2021–22 season. He made his professional debut on 1 August 2021 in the second round of the Taça da Liga against Farense, as a 76th-minute substitute for Carlos; his team won on a penalty shootout after a 0–0 away draw. His Primeira Liga bow was a 3–0 loss at Tondela a week later, also off the bench. His first professional goal was on 26 October, in a 3–1 win over Porto in the League Cup.

Ricardinho scored for the first time in the Portuguese top flight on 7 January 2022, closing the 3–2 home defeat of Sporting CP shortly after having replaced Crysan. In the 2023–24 campaign, he contributed 32 games to a promotion from the Liga Portugal 2 as champions.

In 2024–25, Ricardinho scored seven times to help the Azoreans finish fifth and qualify for the UEFA Conference League, making 31 appearances in all competitions. In May 2025, after rejecting offers to renew his expiring contract, he left.

On 18 June 2025, Ricardinho moved abroad and signed a three-year deal with Liga MX side Juárez.

== Career statistics ==
As of match played on 27 September 2026

Appearances and goals by club, season and competition
Club	Season	League			National cup		League cup		Continental		Other		Total	
Club	Season	Division	Apps	Goals	Apps	Goals	Apps	Goals	Apps	Goals	Apps	Goals	Apps	Goals
Rio Ave B	2017–18	Divisão Elite	23	1	—		—		—		—		23	1
Rio Ave B	2018–19	Divisão Elite	32	9	—		—		—		—		32	9
Rio Ave B	Total		55	10	—		—		—		—		55	10
Praiense (loan)	2019–20	Campeonato de Portugal	16	4	—		—		—		—		16	4
Torreense (loan)	2020–21	Campeonato de Portugal	24	7	5	3	—		—		—		29	10
Santa Clara	2021–22	Primeira Liga	32	5	2	0	4	1	5 (Note: Appearances in UEFA Europa Conference League)	0	—		43	6
Santa Clara	2022–23	Primeira Liga	25	0	1	0	4	2	—		—		30	2
Santa Clara	2023–24	Liga Portugal 2	32	0	4	1	1	0	—		—		37	1
Santa Clara	2024–25	Primeira Liga	28	7	2	0	1	0	—		—		31	7
Santa Clara	Total		117	12	9	1	10	3	5	0	—		141	16
Juárez	2025–26	Liga MX	22	1	—		—		—		3 (Note: Appearances in Leagues Cup)	1	25	1
Juárez	2026–27	Liga MX	8	0	—		—		—		3	1	11	0
Juárez	Total		30	1	—		—		—		6	2	36	3
Career total			242	34	14	4	10	3	5	0	6	2	277	43

== Honours ==
Santa Clara

- Liga Portugal 2: 2023–24
