= Bruno Almeida =

Portuguese footballer

Personal information
- Full name: Bruno Filipe Pereira Soares Almeida
- Date of birth: 9 September 1996 (age 30)
- Place of birth: Porto, Portugal
- Height: 1.72 m (5 ft 8 in)
- Positions: Attacking midfielder; winger

Team information
- Current team: AEL Limassol
- Number: 8

Youth career
- 2006–2008: Bairro Francos
- 2008–2010: Santa Cruz FC
- 2010–2014: Padroense
- 2014–2015: Paços de Ferreira

Senior career*
Years	Team	Apps	(Gls)
2015–2016	Sanjoanense	13	(1)
2016	Bustelo	13	(3)
2016–2017	Pedras Rubras	27	(3)
2017–2018	Anadia	24	(2)
2018–2019	Estoril	24	(2)
2019–2023	Trofense	86	(22)
2022–2023	→ Santa Clara (loan)	22	(1)
2023–2026	Santa Clara	39	(15)
2025	→ Noah (loan)	12	(2)
2025–2026	→ Farense (loan)	22	(0)
2026–	AEL Limassol	3	(0)
- * Club domestic league appearances and goals as of 7 November 2026

Bruno Filipe Pereira Soares Almeida (born 9 September 1996) is a Portuguese professional footballer who plays as an attacking midfielder or winger for Cypriot First Division club AEL Limassol.

== Career ==
Almeida is a youth product of Bairro Francos, Santa Cruz FC, Padroense and Paços de Ferreira. He began his senior career in 2015 with Sanjoanense in the Campeonato de Portugal. He followed that up with other teams in the division including Bustelo, Pedras Rubras, Anadia, and the reserves of Estoril.

In the summer of 2019, Almeida transferred to Trofense in the same division. He became a mainstay, and in his fourth season with the club helped them win the 2020–21 Campeonato de Portugal, earning promotion to the Liga Portugal 2.

After a strong debut season in the second division, on 12 August 2022, Almeida earned a loan to Primeira Liga club Santa Clara for the 2022–23 season. After Santa Clara's relegation to the Liga Portugal 2, Almeida signed a three-year contract with the club.

On 28 January 2025, Armenian Premier League club Noah announced the signing of Almeida on loan from Santa Clara. On 17 July 2025, Almeida moved on a new loan to Farense.

== Career statistics ==
As of match played 4 January 2025

Appearances and goals by club, season and competition
Club	Season	League			National cup		League cup		Other		Total	
Club	Season	Division	Apps	Goals	Apps	Goals	Apps	Goals	Apps	Goals	Apps	Goals
Sanjoanense	2015–16	Campeonato de Portugal	13	1	2	2	0	0	—		15	3
Bustelo	2015–16	Campeonato de Portugal	13	3	0	0	0	0	—		13	3
Pedras Rubas	2016–17	Campeonato de Portugal	27	3	2	0	0	0	—		29	3
Anadia	2017–18	Campeonato de Portugal	24	2	3	1	—		—		27	3
Trofense	2018–19	Campeonato de Portugal	10	3	0	0	—		—		10	3
Trofense	2019–20	Campeonato de Portugal	19	2	1	0	—		—		20	2
Trofense	2020–21	Campeonato de Portugal	25	5	3	0	—		—		28	5
Trofense	2021–22	Liga Portugal 2	31	10	2	0	1	0	—		35	10
Trofense	2022–23	Liga Portugal 2	1	2	0	0	0	0	—		1	2
Trofense	Total		86	22	7	0	1	0	—		94	22
Santa Clara (loan)	2022–23	Primeira Liga	22	1	1	0	2	0	—		25	1
Santa Clara	2023–24	Liga Portugal 2	32	15	4	0	1	0	—		37	15
Santa Clara	2024–25	Primeira Liga	7	0	3	1	1	0	—		11	1
Santa Clara	Total		39	15	7	1	2	0	—		48	16
Career total			224	45	22	4	5	0	0	0	251	49

== Honours ==
Trofense

- Campeonato de Portugal: 2020–21
