= Kennedy Boateng (footballer, born 1996) =

Togolese footballer

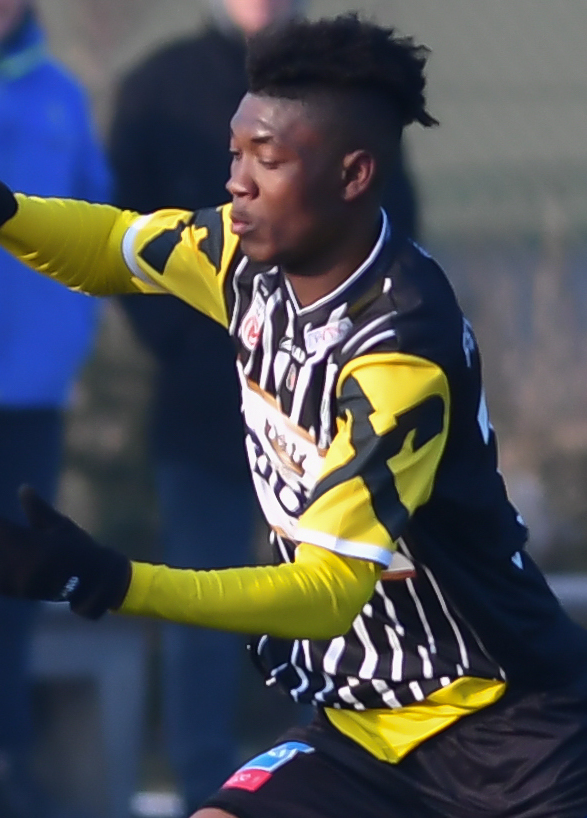
- Boateng with LASK Linz in 2017

Personal information
- Full name: Kennedy Kofi Boateng
- Date of birth: 29 November 1996 (age 29)
- Place of birth: Tamale, Ghana
- Height: 1.91 m (6 ft 3 in)
- Position: Centre-back

Team information
- Current team: Al-Fateh
- Number: 3

Youth career
- –2016: WAFA

Senior career*
Years	Team	Apps	(Gls)
2016	WAFA	20	(1)
2016–2019	LASK Linz	10	(2)
2016–2017	FC Pasching/LASK Linz Juniors	12	(1)
2017–2019	→ SV Ried (loan)	59	(0)
2019–2021	SV Ried	45	(1)
2021–2023	Santa Clara	52	(3)
2023–2024	Austria Lustenau	17	(0)
2024–2026	Dinamo București	66	(7)
2026–	Al-Fateh	9	(0)

International career^{‡}
2022–	Togo	18	(1)
- * Club domestic league appearances and goals as of 15 November 2026 ‡ National team caps and goals as of 17 November 2026

Kennedy Kofi Boateng (born 29 November 1996) is a professional footballer who plays as a centre-back for Saudi Pro League club Al-Fateh. Born in Ghana, he plays for the Togo national team.

== Club career ==
Boateng made his Austrian Football First League debut for LASK Linz on 23 September 2016 in a game against FC Blau-Weiß Linz.

On 2 July 2021, Boateng signed a two-year contract with Santa Clara in Portugal.

On 7 November 2023, Boateng signed a one-year contract with Austrian Bundesliga club Austria Lustenau.

In June 2024, he signed a two-year contract with Romanian side Dinamo București.

== International career ==
Boateng was born in Ghana, and is Togolese by his mother. He was called up to represent the Togo national team in November 2021. He debuted for Togo in a 3–0 friendly win over Sierra Leone on 24 March 2022. He scored his first international goal for Togo on 17 November 2026 against Algeria, in a 3-0 win recorded during 2027 Africa Cup of Nations qualification.

== Career statistics ==
=== Club ===
As of 15 November 2026

Appearances and goals by club, season and competition
Club	Season	League			National cup (Note: Includes Austrian Cup, Taça de Portugal, Cupa României)		League cup (Note: Includes Taça da Liga)		Continental		Other		Total	
Club	Season	Division	Apps	Goals	Apps	Goals	Apps	Goals	Apps	Goals	Apps	Goals	Apps	Goals
WAFA	2016	Ghana Premier League	20	1	—		—		—		—		20	1
LASK	2016–17	2. Liga	10	2	1	0	—		—		—		11	2
LASK Linz Juniors	2016–17	Regionalliga	12	1	—		—		—		—		12	1
SV Ried (loan)	2017–18	2. Liga	29	0	4	3	—		—		—		33	3
SV Ried (loan)	2018–19	2. Liga	30	0	3	0	—		—		—		33	0
SV Ried (loan)	Total		59	0	7	3	—		—		—		66	3
SV Ried	2019–20	2. Liga	21	1	2	0	—		—		—		23	1
SV Ried	2020–21	Austrian Bundesliga	24	0	0	0	—		—		—		24	0
SV Ried	Total		45	1	2	0	—		—		—		47	1
Santa Clara	2021–22	Primeira Liga	26	0	1	0	1	0	2 (Note: Appearances in UEFA Europa Conference League)	0	—		30	0
Santa Clara	2022–23	Primeira Liga	26	3	1	0	3	1	—		—		30	4
Santa Clara	Total		52	3	2	0	4	1	2	0	—		60	4
Austria Lustenau	2023–24	Austrian Bundesliga	17	0	—		—		—		—		17	0
Dinamo București	2024–25	Liga I	28	2	2	0	—		—		—		30	2
Dinamo București	2025–26	Liga I	38	5	5	1	—		—		1 (Note: Appearances in Liga I European play-offs)	0	44	6
Dinamo București	Total		66	7	7	1	—		—		1	0	74	8
Al-Fateh	2026–27	Saudi Pro League	9	0	1	0	—		—		—		10	0
Career total			290	15	20	4	4	1	2	0	1	0	317	20

=== International ===
As of match played 17 November 2026

Appearances and goals by national team and year
National team	Year	Apps	Goals
Togo	2022	6	0
Togo	2023	1	0
Togo	2024	3	0
Togo	2025	4	0
Togo	2026	4	1
Total		18	1

== Honours ==
LASK Linz

- Erste Liga: 2016–17

SV Ried

- 2. Liga: 2019–20

Individual

- Liga I Team of the Season: 2025–26
