= Ítalo (footballer, born February 2002) =

Brazilian football player

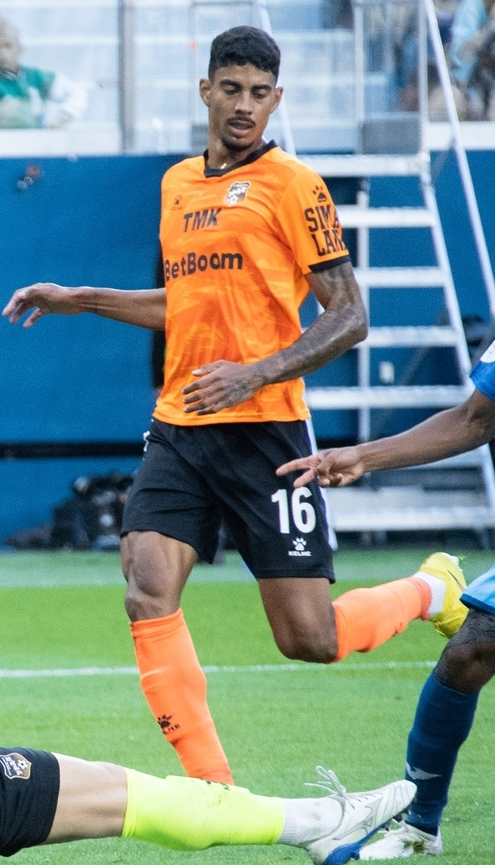

Personal information
- Full name: Ítalo Fernando Assis Gonçalves
- Date of birth: 18 February 2002 (age 24)
- Place of birth: Salvador, Brazil
- Height: 1.95 m (6 ft 5 in)
- Position: Centre-back

Team information
- Current team: Ural Yekaterinburg
- Number: 16

Senior career*
Years	Team	Apps	(Gls)
2021	Figueirense	10	(0)
2022	São Bernardo	22	(0)
2022–2024	Santa Clara	12	(0)
2023–2024	→ Ural Yekaterinburg (loan)	24	(0)
2024–	Ural Yekaterinburg	43	(4)
- * Club domestic league appearances and goals as of 16 May 2026

Ítalo Fernando Assis Gonçalves (born 18 February 2002), known as Ítalo, is a Brazilian football player who plays as a centre-back for Russian club Ural Yekaterinburg.

== Career ==
On 7 July 2023, Ítalo moved to Russian Premier League club Ural Yekaterinburg on a season-long loan. He made his RPL debut for Ural on 5 August 2023 in a game against Orenburg.

On 22 May 2024, Ural exercised their option to buy and signed a three-year contract with Ítalo.

== Career statistics ==
As of match played 1 June 2024

Appearances and goals by club, season and competition
Club	Season	League			Cup		League cup		Continental		Other		Total	
Club	Season	Division	Apps	Goals	Apps	Goals	Apps	Goals	Apps	Goals	Apps	Goals	Apps	Goals
Figuirense	2021	Série C	5	0	0	0	—		—		5 (Note: Appearance(s) in Campeonato Catarinense)	0	10	0
São Bernardo	2022	Série D	18	0	0	0	—		—		4 (Note: Appearance(s) in Campeonato Paulista)	0	22	0
Santa Clara	2022–23	Primeira Liga	12	0	0	0	2	0	—		—		14	0
Ural (loan)	2023–24	Russian Premier League	24	0	7	0	—		—		2 (Note: Appearances in the relegation play-offs)	0	33	0
Career total			59	0	7	0	2	0	0	0	11	0	79	0
