= Cristian Tassano =

Uruguayan footballer (born 1996)

Personal information
- Full name: Cristian Marcelo González Tassano
- Date of birth: 23 July 1996 (age 30)
- Place of birth: Montevideo, Uruguay
- Height: 1.85 m (6 ft 1 in)
- Position: Centre-back

Team information
- Current team: Remo
- Number: 17

Youth career
- Peñarol AUFI
- 2010–2015: Danubio

Senior career*
Years	Team	Apps	(Gls)
2015–2016	Danubio	31	(0)
2016–2020	Sevilla B	31	(2)
2018–2019	→ FC Twente (loan)	33	(0)
2019–2020	→ Mirandés (loan)	10	(0)
2020	→ Rosario Central (loan)	2	(1)
2020–2023	Santa Clara	35	(1)
2023–2024	Khimki	7	(0)
2023–2024	→ Torreense (loan)	12	(1)
2024–2025	Feirense	31	(0)
2025–	Remo	3	(0)

International career^{‡}
2015	Uruguay U20	1	(0)
- * Club domestic league appearances and goals as of 19 October 2025 ‡ National team caps and goals as of 2 September 2023

Cristian Marcelo González Tassano (born 23 July 1996) is an Uruguayan professional footballer who plays as a centre-back for Brazilian club Remo.

== Club career ==
Born in Montevideo, Tassano joined Danubio's youth setup in December 2010, from C.A. Peñarol de AUFI. He made his first team debut on 7 March 2015, starting in a 0–0 home draw against Montevideo Wanderers.

Tassano first appeared in Copa Libertadores on 18 March 2015, playing the full 90 minutes in a 1–2 home loss against Corinthians. He became a regular starter for the side during the 2014–15 campaign, contributing with 22 appearances.

On 23 August 2016, Tassano signed a four-year contract with Sevilla FC, being assigned to the reserves in Segunda División. He made his debut for the club three days later, coming on as a substitute for compatriot Andrés Schetino in a 1–1 away draw against CD Tenerife.

Tassano scored his first senior goal on 13 November 2016, netting the game's only in a home success over UD Almería. On 15 August 2018, after suffering relegation, he was loaned to Eredivisie side FC Twente for one year.

On 14 August 2019, Tassano returned to Spain and its second division, after agreeing to a one-year loan deal with CD Mirandés. Nevertheless, in January 2020 he returned to Sevilla. On 27 January 2020, he then moved to Argentine club Rosario Central on one-year loan deal.

After only two games for Rosario, Tassano terminated his agreement with Rosario and travelled to Portugal to sign with C.D. Santa Clara. The deal with Santa Clara was confirmed on 5 October 2020.

On 10 February 2023, Tassano signed a two-year contract with Russian Premier League club Khimki.

On 1 September 2023, Liga Portugal 2 side Torreense announced the signing of Tassano on a season-long loan from Khimki.

On 1 August 2024, Tassano returned to Liga Portugal 2 and joined Feirense.

== Personal life ==
González Tassano was registered by the Russian Premier League as a citizen of Italy.

== Honours ==
Twente

- Eerste Divisie: 2018–19
