= Paulo Eduardo =

Brazilian footballer (born 2002)

Personal information
- Full name: Paulo Eduardo Ferreira Godinho
- Date of birth: 14 February 2002 (age 24)
- Place of birth: Anápolis, Brazil
- Height: 1.88 m (6 ft 2 in)
- Position: Centre-back

Team information
- Current team: Riga
- Number: 33

Youth career
- 2012–2016: Anápolis
- 2016–2021: Cruzeiro

Senior career*
Years	Team	Apps	(Gls)
2021–2022	Cruzeiro	6	(0)
2022–2024	Santa Clara	8	(0)
2023	→ Novorizontino (loan)	5	(0)
2024	Novorizontino	0	(0)
2024–2025	Alverca	15	(0)
2025–	Riga	28	(3)
2025	→ Auda (loan)	13	(1)

International career
2018	Brazil U17	1	(0)
- * Club domestic league appearances and goals as of 12 November 2026

Paulo Eduardo Ferreira Godinho (born 14 February 2002) is a Brazilian professional footballer who plays as a centre-back for Latvian club Riga.

== Club career ==
Paulo Eduardo is a youth product of Anápolis before moving to Cruzeiro's youth academy in 2016. He signed his first professional contract with Cruzeiro on 3 November 2020. He made his professional debut with Cruzeiro in a 1–0 Campeonato Brasileiro Série B win over Sampaio Corrêa on 9 January 2021.

On 6 August 2022, Paulo Eduardo transferred to Portuguese Primeira Liga club Santa Clara signing a 5-year contract.

In July 2023, Santa Clara sent Paulo Eduardo on a season-long loan to Série B club Grêmio Novorizontino. In January 2024, he joined Novorizontino on a permanent deal.

== Career statistics ==
As of match played 28 May 2023

Appearances and goals by club, season and competition
Club	Season	League			National cup		League cup		Continental		Other		Total	
Club	Season	Division	Apps	Goals	Apps	Goals	Apps	Goals	Apps	Goals	Apps	Goals	Apps	Goals
Cruzeiro	2020	Série B	6	0	—		—		—		—		6	0
Cruzeiro	2021	Série B	3	0	1	0	—		—		—		4	0
Cruzeiro	2022	Série B	0	0	0	0	—		—		1 (Note: Appearance in Campeonato Mineiro)	0	1	0
Cruzeiro	Total		9	0	1	0	—		—		1	0	11	0
Santa Clara	2022–23	Primeira Liga	8	0	1	0	2	0	—		—		11	0
Career total			17	0	2	0	2	0	0	0	1	0	22	0

== International career ==
Paulo Eduardo is a youth international for Brazil, having played for the Brazil U17s in the summer of 2018.
