= Gabriel Silva (footballer, born March 2002) =

Brazilian footballer

Personal information
- Full name: Gabriel Silva Vieira
- Date of birth: 22 March 2002 (age 24)
- Place of birth: Ribeirão Preto, Brazil
- Height: 1.77 m (5 ft 10 in)
- Position: Winger

Team information
- Current team: Braga
- Number: 11

Youth career
- 2015–2020: Palmeiras

Senior career*
Years	Team	Apps	(Gls)
2020–2023	Palmeiras	24	(2)
2022–2023	→ Santa Clara (loan)	33	(5)
2023–2026	Santa Clara	84	(15)
2026–	Braga	8	(0)

International career
2018–2019	Brazil U17	7	(1)
- * Club domestic league appearances and goals as of 25 October 2026

Gabriel Silva Vieira (born 22 March 2002) is a Brazilian professional footballer who plays as a winger for Primeira Liga club Braga.

== Career ==
Silva started his career at Palmeiras before joining Portuguese club Santa Clara on 31 August 2023, following a season-long loan at the club. He recorded a top speed of 40.3 kilometres per hour (25.0 mph) during a stoppage-time counter-attack against Famalicão on 10 May 2025.

On 19 June 2026, Silva signed a five-year contract with Braga.

== Career statistics ==
As of match played 25 October 2026

Appearances and goals by club, season and competition
Club	Season	League			State League		National cup (Note: Includes Copa do Brasil, Taça de Portugal)		Continental		Other		Total	
Club	Season	Division	Apps	Goals	Apps	Goals	Apps	Goals	Apps	Goals	Apps	Goals	Apps	Goals
Palmeiras	2020	Série A	13	0	0	0	2	0	3 (Note: Appearances in Copa Libertadores)	0	—		18	0
Palmeiras	2021	Série A	3	1	6	1	0	0	0	0	—		9	2
Palmeiras	2022	Série A	1	0	0	0	0	0	0	0	—		1	0
Palmeiras	Total		17	1	6	1	2	0	3	0	0	0	28	2
Santa Clara (loan)	2022–23	Primeira Liga	33	5	0	0	2	0	0	0	—		35	5
Santa Clara	2023–24	Liga Portugal 2	22	3	—		3	1	—		—		25	4
Santa Clara	2024–25	Primeira Liga	33	6	—		3	1	—		1 (Note: Appearance(s) in Taça da Liga)	0	37	7
Santa Clara	2025–26	Primeira Liga	27	5	—		1	1	6 (Note: Appearances in UEFA Conference League)	0	1	0	35	12
Santa Clara	Total		82	14	—		7	3	6	0	2	0	97	17
Braga	2026–27	Primeira Liga	8	0	—		0	0	7	0	0	0	15	0
Career total			142	20	6	1	11	3	16	0	2	0	175	24

== Honours ==
Palmeiras

- Campeonato Paulista: 2020
- Copa do Brasil: 2020
- Copa Libertadores: 2020
- Copa São Paulo de Futebol Júnior: 2022
