= Rodrigo Valente =

Portuguese footballer

Personal information
- Full name: Rodrigo Ribeiro Valente
- Date of birth: 15 February 2001 (age 25)
- Place of birth: Santa Maria da Feira, Portugal
- Height: 1.73 m (5 ft 8 in)
- Position: Attacking midfielder

Team information
- Current team: São João de Ver
- Number: 29

Youth career
- 2009–2010: Anta
- 2010–2019: Porto
- 2016–2017: → Padroense (loan)

Senior career*
Years	Team	Apps	(Gls)
2019–2021	Porto B	57	(5)
2021–2022	Estoril	4	(0)
2022–2024	Santa Clara	5	(0)
2023	→ Penafiel (loan)	9	(0)
2024–2025	Felgueiras	6	(0)
2025–	São João de Ver	6	(0)

International career^{‡}
2016	Portugal U15	2	(0)
2016–2017	Portugal U16	11	(0)
2017–2018	Portugal U17	9	(2)
2018–2019	Portugal U18	7	(3)
2019	Portugal U19	5	(0)
- * Club domestic league appearances and goals as of 8 November 2025 ‡ National team caps and goals as of 18 November 2019

Rodrigo Ribeiro Valente (born 15 February 2001) is a Portuguese professional footballer who plays as an attacking midfielder for Liga 3 club São João de Ver.

== Club career ==
He made his LigaPro debut for Porto B on 11 August 2019 in a game against Sporting Covilhã.

On 1 September 2021, he moved to Estoril.

== Career statistics ==
As of match played 29 December 2022

Appearances and goals by club, season and competition
Club	Season	League			National Cup		League Cup		Europe		Other		Total	
Club	Season	Division	Apps	Goals	Apps	Goals	Apps	Goals	Apps	Goals	Apps	Goals	Apps	Goals
Porto B	2018–19	Campeonato Nacional de Juniores	20	4	—		—		4	0	—		24	4
Porto B	2019–20	Campeonato Nacional de Juniores	3	0	0	0	—		3	1	—		6	1
Porto B	2020–21	Liga Portugal 2	34	2	—		—		—		—		34	2
Porto B	Total		57	6	0	0	—		7	1	—		64	6
Estoril	2021–22	Primeira Liga	4	0	1	0	0	0	—		—		5	0
Estoril	2021–22	Liga Portugal 2	4	0	0	0	0	0	—		—		4	0
Estoril	Total		8	0	1	0	0	0	—		—		9	0
Santa Clara	2022–23	Primeira Liga	11	0	0	0	4	0	—		—		16	0
Career total			76	6	1	0	4	0	7	1	0	0	89	7
