= Adriano (footballer, born November 1999) =

Brazilian association football player

Personal information
- Full name: Adriano Firmino dos Santos da Silva
- Date of birth: 4 November 1999 (age 27)
- Place of birth: Rio de Janeiro, Brazil
- Height: 1.87 m (6 ft 2 in)
- Position: Defensive midfielder

Team information
- Current team: Wuhan Three Towns

Youth career
- Cruzeiro

Senior career*
Years	Team	Apps	(Gls)
2019–2022	Cruzeiro	95	(3)
2022–2026	Santa Clara	106	(1)
2026–	Wuhan Three Towns	28	(0)
- * Club domestic league appearances and goals as of 8 November 2026

Adriano Firmino dos Santos da Silva (born 4 November 1999), known as just Adriano, is a Brazilian footballer who plays as a defensive midfielder for Chinese club Wuhan Three Towns.

== Life and career ==
Adriano started playing youth soccer at Resende FC in his native state, Rio de Janeiro. In August 2018, he moved permanently to Cruzeiro, where he started playing at the U20s. After several good performances at the U20 team, the then Cruzeiro's coach, Mano Menezes, moved him up to the senior team in March 2019. On 22 January 2020 he made his professional debut in a Campeonato Mineiro match against Boa Esporte.

On 4 February 2026, Adriano transferred to Chinese Super League club Wuhan Three Towns.

== Career statistics ==
As of match played 8 November 2026

Appearances and goals by club, season and competition
Club	Season	League			State League		Cup		League Cup		Continental		Other		Total	
Club	Season	Division	Apps	Goals	Apps	Goals	Apps	Goals	Apps	Goals	Apps	Goals	Apps	Goals	Apps	Goals
Cruzeiro	2020	Série B	21	0	3	0	1	0	—		—		—		24	0
Cruzeiro	2021	Série B	28	1	12	0	3	0	—		—		—		43	1
Cruzeiro	2022	Série B	14	1	8	1	5	0	—		—		—		27	2
Cruzeiro	Total		63	2	23	1	9	0	—		—		—		95	3
Santa Clara	2022–23	Primeira Liga	31	1	—		1	0	3	0	—		—		35	1
Santa Clara	2023–24	Liga Portugal 2	26	0	—		2	0	1	0	—		—		29	0
Santa Clara	2024–25	Primeira Liga	32	0	—		3	0	1	0	—		—		36	0
Santa Clara	2025–26	Primeira Liga	17	0	—		2	0	1	0	6 (Note: Appearances in UEFA Conference League)	1	—		26	1
Santa Clara	Total		106	1	—		8	0	6	0	6	0	—		126	2
Wuhan Three Towns	2026	Chinese Super League	28	0	—		1	0	—		—		—		29	0
Career total			197	3	23	1	18	0	6	0	6	0	0	0	250	4
