= Thalis =

Brazilian footballer

Personal information
- Full name: Thalis Henrique Cantanhede
- Date of birth: 19 March 1996 (age 30)
- Place of birth: Ariquemes, Brazil
- Height: 1.75 m (5 ft 9 in)
- Positions: Attacking midfielder; winger

Team information
- Current team: Londrina
- Number: 96

Youth career
- –2018: Atlético Mineiro

Senior career*
Years	Team	Apps	(Gls)
2016–2018	Atlético Mineiro	3	(0)
2018	Desportivo Brasil	6	(2)
2018	Boa Esporte	2	(0)
2019–2020	Coimbra-MG	18	(1)
2019	Coimbra-MG B	5	(0)
2020–2021	Oliveirense	31	(4)
2021–2023	Leixões	55	(10)
2023	CSKA 1948 II	3	(1)
2023–2026	CSKA 1948	56	(9)
2026–	Londrina	17	(0)
- * Club domestic league appearances and goals as of 18 November 2026

Thalis Henrique Cantanhede (born 19 March 1996), commonly known as Thalis, is a Brazilian professional footballer who plays as an attacking midfielder or winger for Londrina.

== Career statistics ==
=== Club ===
As of 19 March 2025

Club	Season	League			State League		Cup		League Cup		Continental		Other		Total	
Club	Season	Division	Apps	Goals	Apps	Goals	Apps	Goals	Apps	Goals	Apps	Goals	Apps	Goals	Apps	Goals
Atlético Mineiro	2016	Série A	2	0	0	0	0	0	–		–		–		2	0
Atlético Mineiro	2017	Série A	1	0	0	0	0	0	–		–		–		1	0
Atlético Mineiro	2018	Série A	0	0	0	0	0	0	–		–		–		0	0
Atlético Mineiro	Total		3	0	0	0	0	0	0	0	0	0	0	0	3	0
Desportivo Brasil	2018	–			6 (Note: Appearances in the Campeonato Paulista A3)	2	0	0	–		–		–		6	2
Boa Esporte	2018	Série B	2	0	0	0	0	0	–		–		–		2	0
Coimbra-MG	2019	–			10 (Note: Appearances in the Campeonato Mineiro Module II)	0	0	0	–		–		–		10	0
Coimbra-MG	2020	–			8 (Note: Appearances in the Campeonato Mineiro)	1	0	0	–		–		–		8	1
Coimbra-MG	Total		0	0	18	1	0	0	0	0	0	0	0	0	18	1
Coimbra-MG B	2019	–			5 (Note: Appearances in the Campeonato Mineiro Segunda Divisão)	0	0	0	–		–		–		5	0
Oliveirense	2020–21	Liga Portugal 2	31	2	–		1	0	0	0	–		–		32	2
Leixões	2021–22	Liga Portugal 2	27	2	–		2	1	0	0	–		–		29	3
Leixões	2022–23	Liga Portugal 2	28	8	–		3	1	4	1	–		–		35	10
Leixões	Total		55	10	0	0	5	2	4	1	0	0	0	0	64	13
CSKA 1948	2023–24	First League	23	0	–		1	0	–		2 (Note: Appearances in the UEFA Conference League)	0	2 (Note: Appearances in the Bulgarian Supercup and First League Playoffs)	0	28	0
CSKA 1948	2024–25	First League	33	9	–		2	0	–		4 (Note: Appearances in the UEFA Conference League)	1	–		39	10
CSKA 1948	2025–26	First League	0	0	–		0	0	–		–		–		0	0
CSKA 1948	Total		56	9	0	0	3	0	0	0	6	1	2	0	67	10
CSKA 1948 II	2023–24	Second League	3	1	–		–		–		–		–		3	1
Career total			150	22	29	3	9	2	4	1	6	1	2	0	197	29
