= Régis N'do =

Burkinabé footballer

Personal information
- Date of birth: 22 May 2001 (age 25)
- Place of birth: Attécoubé, Ivory Coast
- Height: 1.81 m (5 ft 11 in)
- Position: Winger

Team information
- Current team: AVS
- Number: 17

Youth career
- Attecoube
- Derby Académie

Senior career*
Years	Team	Apps	(Gls)
2019–2022	Betis Deportivo	17	(0)
2021–2022	→ Oliveira Hospital (loan)	24	(4)
2022–2025	Estrela Amadora	50	(3)
2024–2025	→ Leixões (loan)	29	(1)
2025–2026	Hapoel Haifa	18	(0)
2026–	AVS	1	(0)

International career^{‡}
2024–	Burkina Faso	1	(0)
- * Club domestic league appearances and goals as of 13 September 2026 ‡ National team caps and goals as of 12:32, 13 June 2024 (UTC)

Régis N'do (born 22 May 2001) is a professional footballer who plays as a winger for Liga Portugal 2 club AVS. Born in the Ivory Coast, he plays for the Burkina Faso national team.

== Professional career ==
N'do is a youth product of the Ivorian club Attecoube and the Malian club Derby Académie. He moved to Spain with Betis Deportivo 28 August 2019. In April 2020 during the COVID-19 pandemic, N'do was the only of 15 players that could not travel home after an extended lockdown due to difficulties in Mali and possible issues on return and was forced to train alone. On 31 August 2021 he extended his contract with Betis, and went on loan to Oliveira Hospital in the Liga 3 for the 2021–22 season.

On 5 August 2022, he transferred to the Liga Portugal 2 club Estrela Amadora. He helped Estrela Amadora earn promotion to the Primeira Liga for the 2023–24 season.

On August 23, 2024, N'do was loaned out to Liga Portugal 2 club Leixões for the rest of the season.

== International career ==
N'do was born in the Ivory Coast to a Burkinabé father and Ivorian mother, and moved to Mali at a young age. He holds Malian, Ivorian and Burkinabé citizenship. In December 2023, he opted to play for the Burkina Faso national team. He was part of the extended squad pre-tournament for the 2023 Africa Cup of Nations.
