= Victor Bobsin =

Brazilian footballer

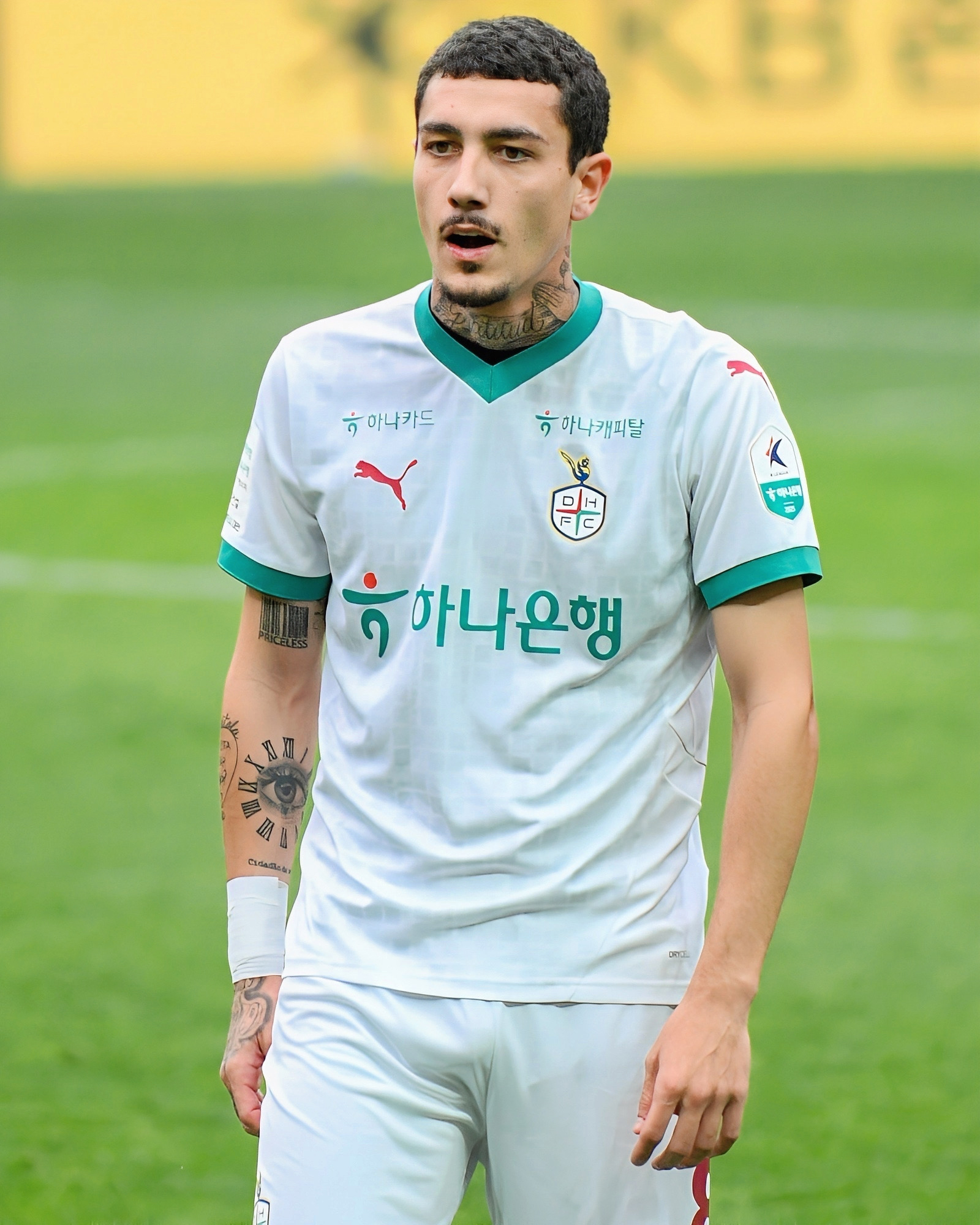
- Bobsin in 2025

Personal information
- Full name: Victor Bobsin Pereira
- Date of birth: 12 January 2000 (age 26)
- Place of birth: Osório, Brazil
- Height: 1.85 m (6 ft 1 in)
- Position: Defensive midfielder

Team information
- Current team: Daejeon Hana Citizen
- Number: 8

Youth career
- 2012–2021: Grêmio

Senior career*
| Years | Team | Apps | (Gls) |
| 2021–2022 | Grêmio | 13 | (0) |
| 2022–2025 | Santa Clara | 24 | (0) |
| 2023–2024 | → Daegu FC (loan) | 26 | (2) |
| 2024 | → Daejeon Hana Citizen (loan) | 13 | (0) |
| 2025– | Daejeon Hana Citizen | 25 | (1) |

International career^{‡}
| 2014–2015 | Brazil U15 | | |
| 2016–2017 | Brazil U17 | 18 | (0) |
| 2018 | Brazil U20 | 4 | (0) |
- * Club domestic league appearances and goals as of 3 August 2026 ‡ National team caps and goals as of 29 March 2021

Victor Bobsin Pereira (born 12 January 2000) is a Brazilian professional footballer who plays as a Defensive midfielder for K League 1 club Daejeon Hana Citizen.

== Club career ==
=== Grêmio ===
Born in Osório, Brazil, Victor Bobsin joined the Grêmio's Academy at the age of 12 in 2012.

=== Santa Clara ===
On 4 August 2022, Bobsin signed a three-year contract with Santa Clara in Portugal.

=== Daegu FC ===
On 4 July 2023, Bobsin signed a season-long loan with Daegu FC from Santa Clara.

=== Daejeon Hana Citizen ===
On 25 July 2024, Bobsin signed a season-long loan with Daejeon Hana Citizen from Santa Clara.

On 17 January 2025, Bobsin will joined Daejeon Hana on a four-year contract deal.

== Career statistics ==
=== Club ===
As of match played 10 November 2024.

Appearances and goals by club, season and competition
| Club | Season | League | | | State League | | National Cup | | League Cup | | Continental | | Other | | Total | |
| Club | Season | Division | Apps | Goals | Apps | Goals | Apps | Goals | Apps | Goals | Apps | Goals | Apps | Goals | Apps | Goals |
|---|---|---|---|---|---|---|---|---|---|---|---|---|---|---|---|---|
| Grêmio | 2021 | Série A | 13 | 0 | 4 (Note: Appearance(s) in Campeonato Gaúcho.) | 0 | 3 | 0 | — | | 4 (Note: Appearance(s) in Copa Sudamericana.) | 0 | — | | 24 | 0 |
| Grêmio | 2022 | Série A | 0 | 0 | 2 | 0 | 0 | 0 | — | | 0 | 0 | — | | 2 | 0 |
| Grêmio | Total | | 13 | 0 | 6 | 0 | 3 | 0 | — | | 4 | 0 | — | | 26 | 0 |
| Santa Clara | 2022–23 | Primeira Liga | 24 | 0 | — | | 0 | 0 | 4 | 0 | — | | — | | 28 | 0 |
| Daegu FC (loan) | 2023 | K League 1 | 11 | 1 | — | | 0 | 0 | — | | — | | — | | 11 | 1 |
| Daegu FC (loan) | 2024 | K League 1 | 15 | 1 | — | | 0 | 0 | — | | — | | — | | 15 | 1 |
| Daegu FC (loan) | Total | | 26 | 2 | — | | 0 | 0 | — | | — | | — | | 26 | 2 |
| Daejeon Hana Citizen | 2024 | K League 1 | 13 | 0 | — | | 0 | 0 | — | | — | | — | | 13 | 0 |
| Daejeon Hana Citizen | 2025 | K League 1 | 0 | 0 | — | | 0 | 0 | — | | — | | — | | 0 | 0 |
| Daejeon Hana Citizen | Total | | 13 | 0 | — | | 0 | 0 | — | | — | | — | | 13 | 0 |
| Career total | | | 76 | 2 | 6 | 0 | 3 | 0 | 4 | 0 | 4 | 0 | 0 | 0 | 93 | 2 |

=== International ===
As of 27 March 2021.

| National team | Year | Competitive | | Friendly | | Total | |
| National team | Year | Apps | Goals | Apps | Goals | Apps | Goals |
|---|---|---|---|---|---|---|---|
| Brazil U17 | 2016 | — | | 2 (Note: Appearance(s) in BRICS U-17 Football Cup.) | 0 | 2 | 0 |
| Brazil U17 | 2017 | 15 (Note: Appearance(s) in Campeonato Sudamericano Sub-17.) (Note: Appearance(s) in FIFA U-17 World Cup.) | 0 | 1 (Note: Appearance(s) in preparatory friendly matches for FIFA U-17 World Cup.) | 0 | 16 | 0 |
| Brazil U17 | Total | 15 | 0 | 3 | 0 | 18 | 0 |
| Brazil U20 | 2018 | — | | 4 | 0 | 4 | 0 |
| Brazil U20 | Total | 0 | 0 | 4 | 0 | 4 | 0 |
| Total | | 15 | 0 | 7 | 0 | 22 | 0 |

== Honours ==
Brazil U17

- Campeonato Sudamericano Sub-17: 2017

Grêmio

- Campeonato Gaúcho: 2021, 2022
- Recopa Gaúcha: 2021
