= Tomás Domingos =

Portuguese footballer (born 1999)

Personal information
- Full name: Tomás Caldas Januário Carvalho Domingos
- Date of birth: 1 May 1999 (age 27)
- Place of birth: Oeiras, Portugal
- Height: 1.75 m (5 ft 9 in)
- Position: Right-back

Team information
- Current team: Académico de Viseu
- Number: 21

Youth career
- 2009–2016: Oeiras
- 2016–2018: Belenenses
- 2018–2020: Benfica

Senior career*
Years	Team	Apps	(Gls)
2020–2022	Mafra	49	(1)
2022–2023	Santa Clara	0	(0)
2023–2025	Marítimo	53	(0)
2025–	Académico de Viseu	13	(0)
- * Club domestic league appearances and goals as of 19 June 2026

Tomás Caldas Januário Carvalho Domingos (born 1 May 1999) is a Portuguese professional footballer who plays as a right-back for Primeira Liga club Académico de Viseu.

== Career ==
On 13 September 2020, Domingos made his professional debut with Mafra in a Liga Portugal 2 match against Cova da Piedade.

On 22 June 2022, Primeira Liga side Santa Clara announced the signing of Domingos on a three-year contract. However, the right-back suffered a car accident on the Summer of 2022, which affected his ability to start off well for Santa Clara, and he went on to never make an appearance for the Azores-based team. In the January transfer window of 2023, Domingos was linked with a move to Casa Pia, but the transfer collapsed.

On 11 July 2023, Domingos signed a two-year contract with Madeira-based side Marítimo, who had been recently relegated to the Liga Portugal 2.

On 1 July 2025, Domingos moved to Académico de Viseu on a two-season deal.
