= Matheus Babi =

Brazilian footballer

Matheus Calvin
Personal information
- Full name: Matheus Barcelos da Silva
- Date of birth: 18 July 1997 (age 29)
- Place of birth: Macaé, Brazil
- Height: 1.91 m (6 ft 3 in)
- Position: Forward

Team information
- Current team: Suwon
- Number: 9

Youth career
- 2014–2017: Macaé
- 2016–2017: → Grêmio (loan)

Senior career*
Years	Team	Apps	(Gls)
2016–2020	Macaé	41	(11)
2019	→ America-RJ (loan)	25	(11)
2020–2021	Serra Macaense	0	(0)
2020–2021	→ Botafogo (loan)	42	(13)
2021–2025	Athletico Paranaense	22	(4)
2022	→ Santa Clara (loan)	26	(5)
2023	→ Goiás (loan)	17	(4)
2024	→ Peñarol (loan)	16	(4)
2025–2026	Juventude	20	(2)
2026–	Suwon	13	(3)
- * Club domestic league appearances and goals as of 5 August 2026

Matheus Barcelos da Silva (born 18 March 1997), known as Matheus Babi, is a Brazilian professional footballer who plays as a forward for K League 2 club Suwon.

== Club career ==
Born in Macaé, Rio de Janeiro, Babi represented Macaé Esporte as a youth. He made his first-team debut on 29 February 2016, coming on as a second-half substitute for Yuri in a 3–1 Campeonato Carioca away loss against Volta Redonda.

On 31 May 2016, Babi signed his first professional contract, agreeing to a deal until May 2018. Thirteen days later, he agreed to a loan deal with Grêmio until December 2017, and was assigned back to the under-20 squad.

Back with Macaé for the 2018 campaign, Babi scored his first senior goal on 10 January of that year, netting the opener in a 3–3 home draw against America-RJ. He also featured regularly in the 2018 Série D and in the 2019 Campeonato Carioca before joining America on loan on 19 March 2019.

Babi scored 12 goals in 27 appearances for America, helping in their promotion as runners-up. He returned to Macaé in November 2019, for the ensuing Cariocão, and scored five goals during the competition.

On 15 February 2020, Babi signed a three-year contract with Serra Macaense, but was loaned to Série A club Botafogo on 3 July. He made his debut in the top tier on 13 August, starting and scoring the equalizer in a 1–1 away draw against Red Bull Bragantino.

== Career statistics ==
As of match played 28 May 2023

Appearances and goals by club, season and competition
Club	Season	League			State League		National Cup		League Cup		Continental		Other		Total	
Club	Season	Division	Apps	Goals	Apps	Goals	Apps	Goals	Apps	Goals	Apps	Goals	Apps	Goals	Apps	Goals
Macaé	2016	Série C	0	0	2	0	—		—		—		—		2	0
Macaé	2018	Série D	7	2	12	1	—		—		4 (Note: Appearance(s) in Copa Rio)	0	—		23	3
Macaé	2019	Carioca	—		11	3	—		—		—		—		11	3
Macaé	2020	Carioca	—		9	5	—		—		—		—		9	5
Macaé	Total		7	2	34	9	0	0	—		4	0	—		45	11
America-RJ (loan)	2019	Carioca B1	—		25	11	—		—		2	1	—		27	12
Serra Macaense	2020	Carioca B1	—		0	0	—		—		—		—		0	0
Botafogo (loan)	2020	Série A	29	7	—		1	0	—		—		—		30	7
Athletico Paranaense	2021	Serie A	11	3	4	1	0	0	—		8 (Note: Appearance(s) in Copa Sudamericana)	0	—		23	4
Santa Clara (loan)	2022–23	Primeira Liga	26	5	—		1	0	4	1	—		—		31	6
Career total			72	16	63	21	2	0	4	1	14	1	0	0	155	39

== Honours ==
=== Club ===
Athletico Paranaense

- Copa Sudamericana: 2021
