= Rildo (footballer, born 2000) =

Brazilian footballer

Personal information
- Full name: Rildo Gonçalves de Amorim Filho
- Date of birth: 21 January 2000 (age 26)
- Place of birth: Rondonópolis, Brazil
- Height: 1.78 m (5 ft 10 in)
- Positions: Attacking midfielder; winger

Team information
- Current team: Avaí (on loan from Santa Clara)
- Number: 37

Youth career
- Academia
- 2013–2016: → São Paulo (loan)
- 2017–2021: Grêmio

Senior career*
Years	Team	Apps	(Gls)
2020–2022	Grêmio	14	(1)
2021	→ Brasil de Pelotas (loan)	18	(1)
2022	→ Bahia (loan)	15	(2)
2022–	Santa Clara	24	(3)
2023	→ Portimonense (loan)	11	(0)
2024	→ Juventude (loan)	17	(1)
2024	→ Goiás (loan)	16	(2)
2025	→ Portuguesa (loan)	14	(4)
2025–2026	→ Levski Sofia (loan)	19	(1)
2026–	→ Avaí (loan)	6	(0)
- * Club domestic league appearances and goals as of 18 November 2026

Rildo Gonçalves de Amorim Filho (born 21 January 2000), known as Rildo, is a Brazilian professional footballer who plays as an attacking midfielder and winger for Campeonato Brasileiro Série B club Avaí on loan from Santa Clara.

== Club career ==
Born in Rondonópolis, Mato Grosso, Rildo began his career with hometown side Academia before joining the youth sides of São Paulo in 2013. In 2017, aged 16, he moved to Grêmio and was initially assigned to the under-17 team.

In May 2020, after impressing with the under-20 side, Rildo signed a contract extension until the end of 2023. He was promoted to the first team by head coach Renato Gaúcho in July, and made his first team debut late in the month, coming on as a second-half substitute for Patrick in a 0–0 Campeonato Gaúcho away draw against Novo Hamburgo.

Rildo made his Série A debut on 10 September 2020, replacing Isaque late into a 2–0 away win over Bahia. On 17 August of the following year, after making no appearances during the season, he was loaned to Série B side Brasil de Pelotas.

Back to Grêmio for the 2022 Campeonato Gaúcho, Rildo moved on loan to Bahia on 12 April 2022. On 19 July, however, his loan was cut short, and signed a five-year deal with Portuguese Primeira Liga side Santa Clara on 9 August.

Rildo featured regularly for Santa Clara during the season, but moved to Portimonense on loan on 28 June 2023, with Gustavo Klismahn moving in the opposite direction. On 29 December, however, he left the club to return to his home country, after joining Juventude also in a temporary deal.

On 13 July 2024, Rildo was presented at Goiás. The following 16 January, still owned by Santa Clara, he moved to Portuguesa until July.

After his loan at Portuguesa was terminated, on 10 June 2025, Rildo was loaned to Bulgarian First League club Levski Sofia for one season.

== Career statistics ==
As of 10 August 2026

Appearances and goals by club, season and competition
Club	Season	League			State league		National cup (Note: Includes Copa do Brasil, Taça de Portugal, Bulgarian Cup)		League cup (Note: Includes Taça da Liga)		Continental		Other		Total	
Club	Season	Division	Apps	Goals	Apps	Goals	Apps	Goals	Apps	Goals	Apps	Goals	Apps	Goals	Apps	Goals
Grêmio	2020	Série A	2	0	1 (Note: Appearance(s) in Campeonato Gaúcho)	1	0	0	—		1 (Note: Appearance(s) in Copa Libertadores)	0	—		4	0
Grêmio	2021	Série A	0	0	—		0	0	—		1 (Note: Appearance(s) in Copa Sudamericana)	0	—		1	0
Grêmio	2022	Série A	0	0	10	1	0	0	—		0	0	—		10	1
Grêmio	Total		2	0	11	1	0	0	—		2	0	—		15	1
Brasil de Pelotas (loan)	2021	Série B	18	1	—		—		—		—		—		18	1
Bahia (loan)	2022	Série B	15	2	—		—		—		—		—		15	2
Santa Clara	2022–23	Primeira Liga	23	3	—		0	0	4	2	—		—		27	5
Santa Clara	2024–25	Primeira Liga	0	0	—		0	0	0	0	—		—		0	0
Santa Clara	2026–27	Primeira Liga	1	0	—		0	0	0	0	—		—		1	0
Santa Clara	Total		24	3	—		0	0	4	2	—		—		28	5
Portimonense (loan)	2023–24	Primeira Liga	11	0	—		2	1	2	1	—		—		15	2
Juventude (loan)	2024	Série A	6	0	11	1	1	0	—		—		—		18	1
Goiás (loan)	2024	Série B	16	2	—		—		—		—		—		16	2
Portuguesa (loan)	2025	Série D	5	2	9 (Note: Appearance(s) in Campeonato Paulista)	2	1	1	—		—		—		15	5
Levski Sofia (loan)	2025–26	Bulgarian First League	19	1	—		1	0	—		8 (Note: Four appearances in UEFA Europa League, four appearances in UEFA Conference League)	0	1 (Note: Appearance in Bulgarian Super Cup)	0	29	1
Career total			115	11	31	4	5	2	6	3	10	0	1	0	169	20

== Honours ==
Grêmio

- Campeonato Gaúcho: 2020, 2021, 2022
- Recopa Gaúcha: 2021

Levski Sofia

- Bulgarian First League: 2025–26

Individual

- Primeira Liga Goal of the Month: August 2022
