= Estádio de São Miguel (Ponta Delgada) =

Stadium in Ponta Delgada, Azores, Portugal

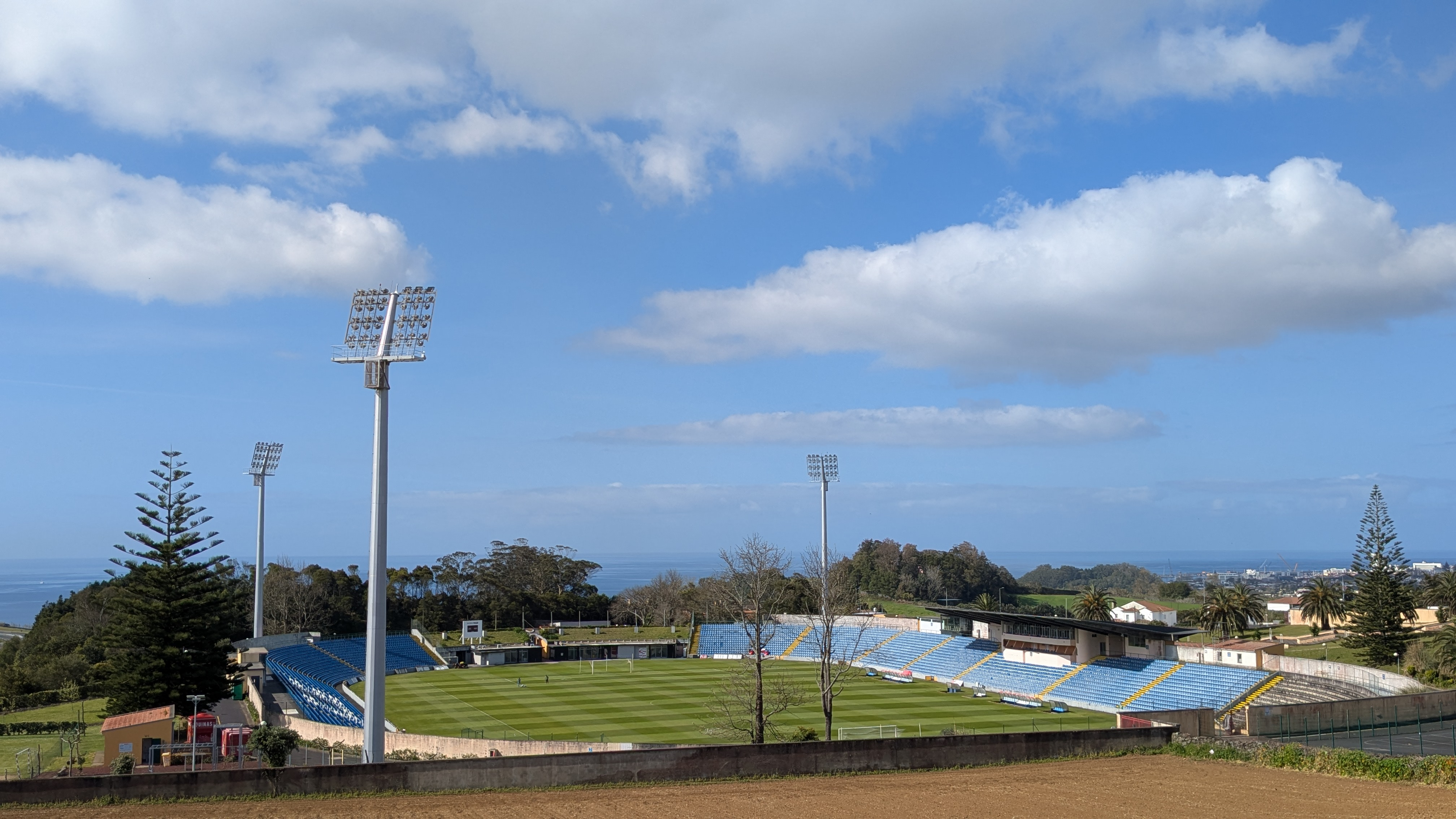
- UEFA
- Interactive map of Estádio de São Miguel
- Full name: Estádio de São Miguel
- Location: Ponta Delgada (Azores), Portugal
- Coordinates: 37°45′49″N 25°37′21″W
- Owner: Regional Government of the Azores
- Operator: Santa Clara
- Capacity: 12,500
- Surface: Grass
- Record attendance: 15,000 (19 August 1998); Portugal 2–1 Mozambique
- Field size: 105 x 68 m

Construction
- Built: 1976; 50 years ago
- Opened: 18 April 1976
- Renovated: 2009, 2014

Tenant
- Santa Clara (1976–present)

The Estádio de São Miguel (English: Stadium of São Miguel) is a large open-air stadium in the municipality of Ponta Delgada in the Portuguese archipelago of the Azores. It is used mostly for national and regional football matches, and official home stadium of Santa Clara.

== History ==
The stadium opened on 18 April 1976; the first official game held at the stadium was a friendly match between Sporting and Benfica, with Sporting winning 4–3. Prior to the official opening game, a friendly tournament was played by representatives of the three local Football Associations in the Azores: Angra do Heroísmo, Horta and Ponta Delgada.

The Portugal national team has already played two matches at the stadium, the last of which was a 2–0 friendly victory over Egypt, with a sold-out crowd.

Renovations to the stadium occurred in the 2008–09 season, with improved lighting, remodelled seating, new turf and improvements to the rest areas. Renovations and expenditures were also slated for the 2013–14, that included: improvements and interventions in the lighting towers and requalification of the exterior spaces of the stadium, respectively.

The stadium, home to the Azorean Football Team, was approved by UEFA in June 2025 with Category 3 status, thus allowing Santa Clara to play the 2nd and 3rd qualifying rounds and play-offs of the Conference League at home. However, some work will need to be done on the stadium so that it can be upgraded and approved for the League Phase of European competitions.

== Architecture ==
The 105 by 68 metres (344 ft × 223 ft) stadium holds approximately 12,500 spectators.

== Portugal national team matches ==
The following national team matches were held in the stadium.

#	Date	Score	Opponent	Competition
1.	19 August 1998	2–1	Mozambique	Friendly
2.	17 August 2005	2–0	Egypt	Friendly

== See also ==
- List of football stadiums in Portugal
