= 2010 Taça de Portugal final =

- Event: 2009–10 Taça de Portugal
Chaves	Porto
1	2
- Date: May 16, 2010
- Venue: Estádio Nacional, Oeiras
- Man of the Match: Hulk
- Referee: Pedro Proença (Lisbon)
- Attendance: 23,400

The 2010 Taça de Portugal final was the final match of the 70th season of the Taça de Portugal, the main Portuguese football knockout competition. It was played at the Estádio Nacional, Oeiras, on the 16 May 2010. The final was contested between Chaves of the Liga de Honra and Porto of the Primeira Liga. Chaves were appearing in their first final, whilst Porto were appearing in their twenty-seventh final of which it was their third consecutive final. In Portugal, the final was televised live in HD on Sport TV and TVI.

As Chaves were in the Liga de Honra they played one more round than Porto. Therefore, Chaves progressed through six rounds to reach the final, whereas Porto progressed through five. Matches up to the semi-final were contested on a one-off basis with the exception of the semi-finals which were contested over two-legs, with a match at each team's home ground.

Porto won the final 2–1, claiming their third Taça de Portugal in five years. Fredy Guarín put Porto in front in the 13th minute, and Radamel Falcao doubled their lead ten minutes later. Chaves halved the deficit in the 85th minute through Clemente, but Porto held on to secure the Taça de Portugal for the 15th time. Due to Porto's cup success, they would go on to face Benfica in the 2010 Supertaça Cândido de Oliveira.

== Background ==
Chaves were appearing in their first Cup final. They were the first team from outside the Primeira Liga to reach the final since the 2002 Taça de Portugal Final, when Leixões of the Segunda Divisão lost to Sporting CP, 1–0. Porto were appearing in their 27th final; they had won 14 (1956, 1958, 1968, 1977, 1984, 1988, 1991, 1994, 1998, 2000, 2001, 2003, 2006, 2009) and lost 12 (1953, 1959, 1961, 1964, 1978, 1980, 1981, 1983, 1985, 1992, 2004, 2008). In Porto's and Chaves' entire history, the clubs have met prior to final on 28 occasions, with 26 league games and 2 cup games. Porto have won 26 of their 28 meetings between the two sides, while Chaves have only beaten Porto once in their entire history. This victory came in a 1988–89 Primeira Divisão home game.

As Chaves had never played in a Taça de Portugal final, this was the first time they had visited the Estádio Nacional. For Porto, this was their seventh final in ten seasons. The last cup final win occurred in the previous season, where they defeated Paços de Ferreira 1–0. Chaves and Porto had previously met two times in the Taça de Portugal. In the most recent meeting between the two sides, a 2007–08 fourth round tie, Porto defeated Chaves at the Estádio Municipal de Chaves 2–0, with goals from Adriano and Hélder Postiga. The first meeting between the two sides in this competition occurred in a third round tie in the 1984–85 season were Porto won 2–0.

== Route to the final ==
=== Chaves ===
Round	Opponents	Score
2	Amares (H)	2–0
3	Leça (A)	0–3
4	União da Serra (H)	2–0
5	Beira-Mar (H)	1–0
QF	Paços de Ferreira (A)	1–2
SF	Naval (H)	1–0
SF	Naval (A)	1–2

As a Liga de Honra team, Chaves entered the 2009–10 Taça de Portugal in the second round, where they were drawn at home against Terceira Divisão side Amares. Chaves would defeat Amares comfortably, 2–0 at the Estádio Municipal de Chaves to progress to the third round. For the third round, Chaves were yet again drawn against a Third Division side, this time they faced Leça away from home. Just like the previous round they defeated Leça with ease with a 3–0 win. In the next round, Chaves were drawn at home against União da Serra from the Segunda Divisão. They would defeat the side from Leiria 2–0, thanks to two goals from Senegalese striker Mbaye Diop.

In the fifth round, Chaves defeated Liga de Honra side Beira-Mar, 1–0 to progress to the quarter finals. At the quarter final stage, they were drawn away against Primeira Liga side Paços de Ferreira. Chaves went into the game as underdogs, they started the game strongly with two early goals in the first ten minutes of the game thanks to goals from Carlos Pinto and Mbaye Diop. In the second half, Paços de Ferreira clawed a goal back in the 64th minute from Brazilian striker William. Chaves would hang on to progress to semi finals. Naval were Chaves opponents in the semi-final. The Taça de Portugal semi-final was played over two legs with one home game and one away game. The first leg was played at Chaves' Estádio Municipal de Chaves, Chaves won the first game 1–0, thanks to a 94th minute late winner from center half Ricardo Rocha. The second leg at the Estádio Municipal José Bento Pessoa saw Naval dominate the opening proceedings and taking an early lead in the 15th minute with a goal from Fábio Júnior. Fábio Júnior's goal would tie the game on aggregate. The game would remain tied on aggregate and would need extra time to settle the winner. In extra time, Edu would score two goals to send Chaves to their very first cup final.

=== Porto ===
Round	Opponents	Score
3	Sertanense (H)	4–0
4	Oliveirense (A)	0–2
5	Belenenses (A)	2–2 (9–10 p)
QF	Sporting CP (H)	5–2
SF	Rio Ave (A)	1–3
SF	Rio Ave (H)	0–4

As a Primeira Liga team, Porto entered the Taça de Portugal in the third round. In the third round they were drawn against Sertanense at home. They defeated the third division side, 4–0 with two goals from Ernesto Farías and Hulk. In the fourth round, Porto faced Liga de Honra side Oliveirense away from home. Goals from Raul Meireles and Rolando secured the win, which allowed Porto to progress into the next phase of the competition.

The next round saw Porto face Belenenses at the Estádio do Restelo. The game began with Belenenses scoring early through Lima. A minute later, however, Radamel Falcao equalized for Porto. The score remained level at 1–1 until the 80th minute, were Lima scored his second goal of the night. With Porto pressing in the closing stages to take the game to extra time, Cristian Rodríguez scored a decisive goal which tied the game 2–2. Following 30 minutes of extra time with no goals, the game went to penalties, where Porto won 9–10.

In the quarter-finals, Porto were drawn at home against rivals Sporting CP. The match, held at the Estádio do Dragão, saw Porto take the lead with a goal from Rolando, though Sporting winger Marat Izmailov would equalize four minutes later. Before half-time, Falcao would go on to score two goals and extend Porto's lead to 3–1. After the interval, Porto would enter strongly and extend their lead with a goal from winger Silvestre Varela; nine minutes later, Mariano González would score for Porto before near the end Brazilian striker Liédson scored a consolation goal for Sporting to make the final score 5–2. In the semi-finals, Porto was pitted against fellow Primeira Liga side Rio Ave. The first game saw Porto defeat Rio Ave at the Estádio do Rio Ave FC, 3–1. The return and final leg saw Porto win 4–0 at Estádio do Dragão, which ensured their place in the final.

== Match ==
=== Summary ===
Porto dominated possession from the beginning of the match. In the eighth minute, Chaves winger Edu took advantage of a goalkeeping error from Helton, though Edu would go on to waste the golden opportunity when his shot hit the post. Five minutes later, Fredy Guarín received the ball unmarked in the box and fired past goalkeeper Rui Rêgo to score the first goal of the match. Shortly after Porto's first goal, they scored again after Hulk beat the offside trap and set up Radamel Falcao for a tap-in. Up until half time, Porto's Hulk missed several opportunities to extend the lead. In the second half, Chaves began to grow more into the game and attempted to create more chances and test the Porto defense. Porto sat back and imposed a slower rhythm into the game. Ten minutes from the end, Paulo Clemente was brought on for Chaves in which five minutes from time he scored following a defensive mistake by Porto center backs Bruno Alves and Rolando. The game ended with each team having a man sent off. Porto would hold on to capture their 15th Taça de Portugal title.

=== Details ===
16 May 2010
17:00 UTC

Chaves	1–2	Porto
Clemente 85'		Guarín 13'; Falcao 23'

Estádio Nacional, Oeiras
Attendance: 23,400
Referee: Pedro Proença

Chaves	Porto

GK	78	(Portugal) Rui Rêgo
RB	2	(Brazil) Danilo	(yellow card) 25'
CB	4	(Portugal) Ricardo Rocha (c)	(yellow card) 40' (yellow-red card) 92'
CB	30	(Portugal) Lameirão
LB	23	(Portugal) Eduardo	(yellow card) 42'
DM	26	(Ivory Coast) Siaka Bamba
CM	14	(Portugal) Vítor Castanheira		(substituted off) 61'
CM	18	(Portugal) Bruno Magalhães	(yellow card) 18'
RW	20	(Portugal) Edu Machado
LW	11	(Nigeria) Samson Joseph		(substituted off) 61'
CF	21	(Senegal) Mbaye Diop		(substituted off) 80'
Substitutes:
GK	48	(Portugal) Daniel Casaleiro
DF	44	(Brazil) Heslley
MF	8	(Portugal) Flávio Igor		(substituted on) 61'
MF	77	(Portugal) João Fernandes
FW	89	(Brazil) Diego Vicente		(substituted on) 61'
FW	7	(Portugal) Vítor Silva
FW	15	(Portugal) Paulo Clemente		(substituted on) 80'
Manager:
(Portugal) Tulipa

GK	1	(Brazil) Helton
RB	22	(Portugal) Miguel Lopes		(substituted off) 62'
CB	2	(Portugal) Bruno Alves (c)	(yellow card) 12' (yellow-red card) 94'
CB	14	(Portugal) Rolando
LB	15	(Uruguay) Álvaro Pereira
DM	25	(Brazil) Fernando
CM	3	(Portugal) Raul Meireles		(substituted off) 45'
CM	7	(Argentina) Fernando Belluschi
AM	6	(Colombia) Fredy Guarín		(substituted off) 72'
CF	9	(Colombia) Radamel Falcao
CF	12	(Brazil) Hulk
Substitutes:
GK	24	(Portugal) Beto
DF	16	(Brazil) Maicon
DF	23	(Ghana) David Addy
MF	8	(Argentina) Diego Valeri		(substituted on) 72'
MF	10	(Uruguay) Cristian Rodríguez		(substituted on) 62'
MF	20	(Argentina) Tomás Costa		(substituted on) 46'
FW	19	(Argentina) Ernesto Farías
Manager:
(Portugal) Jesualdo Ferreira

2009–10 Taça de Portugal Winners
Porto
15th Title

Man of the match

- (Brazil) Hulk (Porto)

Match officials

- Assistant referees:
  - Ricardo Santos (Lisbon)
  - Tiago Trigo (Lisbon)
- Fourth official: João Capela (Lisbon)

Match rules

- 90 minutes
- 30 minutes of extra-time if necessary.
- Penalty shoot-out if scores still level.
- Seven named substitutes
- Maximum of three substitutions

== See also ==
- 2009–10 FC Porto season
- 2009 Taça da Liga final
