= 2009–10 Taça de Portugal =

Taça de Portugal Millenium

Tournament details
- Country: Portugal
- Teams: 172

Final positions
- Champions: Porto
- Runners-up: Chaves

Tournament statistics
- Matches played: 139
- Goals scored: 425 (3.06 per match)
- Top goal scorer: Radamel Falcao (5 goals)

The 2009–10 Taça de Portugal was the 70th season of the Taça de Portugal. The competition began on 30 August 2009, with the first round matches, and concluded with the final, held on 16 May at the Estádio Nacional, in Oeiras, between defending champions Porto and then Liga de Honra team Chaves. Porto won 2–1 to take their second consecutive cup, and assuring a place in play-off round of the 2010–11 UEFA Europa League.

== Qualified teams ==
The following teams competed in the Taça de Portugal 2009–10:

16 teams of Liga Sagres:

- Académica de Coimbra
- Belenenses
- Benfica
- Leixões
- Marítimo
- Nacional
- Naval 1º de Maio
- Olhanense
- Paços de Ferreira
- Porto
- Rio Ave
- Sporting CP
- Braga
- União de Leiria
- Vitória de Guimarães
- Vitória de Setúbal

16 teams of Liga Vitalis:

- Beira-Mar
- Carregado
- Chaves
- Covilhã
- Desportivo das Aves
- Estoril Praia
- Fátima
- Feirense
- Freamunde
- Gil Vicente
- Oliveirense
- Penafiel
- Portimonense
- Santa Clara
- Trofense
- Varzim

48 teams of Second Division (3rd level):

- Aliados Lordelo
- Boavista ^{1}
- Espinho
- Gondomar
- Lourosa
- Lousada
- Merelinense
- Moreirense
- Padroense
- Paredes
- Ribeirão
- Tirsense
- Valdevez
- Vianense
- Vieira
- Vizela
- Académico de Viseu
- Arouca
- Eléctrico
- Esmoriz
- Mafra
- Marinhense
- Monsanto
- Oliveira do Bairro
- Operário
- Pampilhosa
- Praiense
- Sertanense
- Tondela
- Tourizense
- União da Serra
- Vitória do Pico
- Aljustrelense
- Atlético CP
- Atlético de Reguengos
- Camacha
- Estrela da Amadora ^{2}
- Igreja Nova
- Lagoa
- Louletano
- Marítimo B ^{3}
- Odivelas
- Oriental
- Pinhalnovense
- Pontassolense
- Real SC
- Santana
- União da Madeira

^{1}Boavista forfeited the match.
^{2}Estrela da Amadora were disqualified from the competition.
^{3}Marítimo B are excluded for being a reserve team of Marítimo

91 teams of Terceira Divisão (4th level):

- Andorinha
- Lusitânia
- Tojal
- Coimbrőes
- Alcochetense
- Mangualde
- 1º Dezembro
- Candal
- Alcaíns
- Machico
- Oliveira do Douro
- Mêda
- Estrela da Calheta
- Moura
- Limianos
- Sintrense
- Caldas
- Lusitano de Évora
- Esperanaça de Lagos
- Santiago
- Porto da Cruz
- Madalena
- Capelense
- Fabril
- Montalegre
- Fornos de Algodres
- Nelas
- Anadia
- Farense
- Flamengos
- Oeiras
- Marinhas
- Sanjoanense
- Penalva do Castelo
- Castrense
- Amares
- Rabo de Peixe
- Mirandela
- Famalicão
- Avanca
- Pescadores
- Beira-Mar Monte Gordo
- Torre de Moncorvo
- Fiães
- União Micaelense
- Vila Meã
- Sourense
- Penamacorense
- S. João de Ver
- Morais
- Olivais e Moscavide
- Infesta
- Rebordosa
- Benfica e Castelo Branco
- Santa Maria
- Torreense
- Milheiroense
- Macedo de Cavaleiros
- Gavionenses
- Vigor da Mocidade
- Portomosense
- Juventude de Évora
- Cruzado Canicense
- Porto Moniz
- Quarteirense
- Cova da Piedade
- Caniçal
- Tocha
- Joane
- Fão
- Bragança
- União de Montemor
- Pedrouços
- Maria da Fonte
- Boavista S.Mateus
- Angrense
- Amarante
- AD Oliveirense
- Barreiro
- Casa Pia
- Gândara
- Leça
- Sp. Pombal
- Cinfães
- Ribeira Brava
- Fafe
- Valenciano
- Portosantense
- Cesarense
- Câmara de Lobos
- Serzedelo

== First round ==
In this round entered teams from Segunda Divisão (3rd level) and Terceira Divisão (4th level). A number of teams received a bye to the Second Round: Sertanense (III), Mineiro Aljustrelense (III), Camacha (III), Operário (III), Aliados do Lordelo (III), Tirsense (III), Esmoriz (III), Andorinha (IV), Lusitânia (IV), Atlético do Tojal (IV), Coimbrőes (IV), Alcochetense (IV), Mangualde (IV), 1º Dezembro (IV), Candal (IV), Alcaíns (IV), Machico (IV), Oliveira do Douro (IV), Mêda (IV) and Estrela da Calheta (IV). The matches will be played on August 30, 2009.

Home team	Score	Away team
Tourizense (III)	3–0	Moura (IV)
Pampilhosa (III)	0–0 (aet, p. 4–5)	Vizela (III)
Limianos (IV)	1–1 (aet, p. 3–4)	Sintrense (IV)
Praiense (III)	1–0	Caldas (IV)
Ribeirão (III)	1–2	Lusitano de Évora (IV)
Esperanaça de Lagos (IV)	2–1	Santiago (IV)
Santana (III)	1–0	Porto da Cruz (IV)
Madalena (IV)	0–1	Odivelas (III)
Capelense (IV)	1–1 (aet, p. 3–4)	Fabril (IV)
Montalegre (IV)	0–2	Fornos de Algodres (IV)
Nelas (IV)	4–3	Anadia (IV)
Farense (IV)	2–1	Vitória do Pico (III)
Flamengos (IV)	1–5	Oeiras (IV)
Padroense (III)	2–1	Marinhas (IV)
Sanjoanense (IV)	0–1	Pinhalnovense (III)
Penalva do Castelo (IV)	0–2	Merelinense (III)
Castrense (IV)	0–2	Amares (IV)
Rabo de Peixe (IV)	1–3	Mirandela (IV)
Mafra (III)	3–0^{1}	Estrela da Amadora (III)
Real Massamá (III)	2–0	Famalicão (IV)
Monsanto (III)	4–2	Avanca (IV)
Lagoa (III)	0–1	Atlético CP (III)
Pescadores (IV)	3–0^{2}	Boavista (III)
Beira-Mar Monte Gordo (IV)	1–1 (aet, p. 1–2)	Torre de Moncorvo (IV)
Fiães (IV)	2–1	União Micaelense (IV)
Peniche (IV)	3–2	Vianense (III)
Vila Meã (IV)	3–0	Sourense (IV)
Penamacorense (IV)	1–2	S. João de Ver (IV)
Morais (IV)	2–0	Olivais e Moscavide (IV)
Infesta (IV)	1–2	Rebordosa (IV)

Home team	Score	Away team
Académico de Viseu (III)	0–2	Benfica e Castelo Branco (IV)
União da Serra (III)	3–1	Santa Maria (IV)
Torreense (IV)	1–1 (aet, p. 5–3)	Louletano (III)
Milheiroense (IV)	3–1	Lousada (III)
Macedo de Cavaleiros (IV)	0–0 (aet, p. 4–3)	Lusitânia (III)
Gavionenses (IV)	1–1 (aet, p. 3–4)	Vigor da Mocidade (IV)
Gondomar (III)	3–2	Igreja Nova (III)
Portomosense (IV)	0–1	Juventude de Évora (IV)
Cruzado Canicense (IV)	0–0 (aet, p. 6–5)	Porto Moniz (IV)
Quarteirense (IV)	2–1	Cova da Piedade (IV)
Caniçal (IV)	2–1	União da Tocha (IV)
Joane (IV)	3–3 (aet, p. 2–4)	Fão (IV)
Sporting de Espinho (III)	5–0	Bragança (IV)
Vieira (III)	2–1	União de Montemor (IV)
Pedrouços (IV)	1–2	Maria da Fonte (IV)
União da Madeira (III)	6–0	Boavista S.Mateus (IV)
Oliveira do Bairro (III)	0–0 (aet, p. 3–1)	Pontassolense (III)
Arouca (III)	5–0	Angrense (IV)
Tondela (III)	2–0	Amarante (IV)
AD Oliveirense (IV)	4–0	Barreiro (IV)
Casa Pia (IV)	2–0	Gândara (IV)
1º de Maio Sarilhense (DIT)	1–4	Moreirense (III)
Paredes (III)	4–1	Atlético de Reguengos (III)
Valdevez (III)	1–1 (aet, p. 3–5)	Leça (IV)
Sp. Pombal (IV)	0–2	Cinfães (IV)
Ribeira Brava (IV)	2–0	Fafe (IV)
Valenciano (IV)	4–2 (aet)	Portosantense (IV)
Eléctrico (III)	3–1	Cesarense (IV)
Câmara de Lobos (IV)	0–5 (aet)	Oriental (III)
Marinhense (III)	0–0 (aet, p. 7–6)	Serzedelo (IV)

Note: Roman numerals in brackets denote the league tier the clubs participate in during the 2009–10 season.
^{1}Estrela da Amadora were disqualified from the competition.
^{2}Boavista forfeited the match.

== Second round ==
In this round entered teams from Liga Vitalis (2nd level) and the winners from the first round. The matches were played on September 12 and 13, 2009.

Home team	Score	Away team
Estoril (II)	3–3 (aet, p. 3–4)	Esmoriz (III)
Santana (III)	2–5	Camacha (III)
Marinhense (III)	0–4	Feirense (II)
Trofense (II)	1–3	Paredes (III)
Portimonense (II)	2–2 (aet, p. 4–3)	Real Massamá (III)
Beira-Mar (II)	2–0	F.C. Vizela (III)
Praiense (III)	0–1	Varzim (II)
Candal (IV)	0–4	Oliveirense (II)
Gil Vicente (II)	2–0	Macedo de Cavaleiros (IV)
Desportivo de Chaves (II)	2–0	Amares (IV)
Morais (IV)	0–5	Sporting da Covilhã (II)
Mangualde (IV)	1–2	Freamunde (II)
Penafiel (II)	3–1 (aet)	AD Oliveirense (IV)
Vila Meã (IV)	2–0	Desportivo das Aves (II)
Maria da Fonte (IV)	0–5	Carregado (II)
Santa Clara (II)	1–0	Rebordosa (IV)
Odivelas (III)	1–2	Mafra(III)
Sertanense (III)	1–1 (aet, p. 6–5)	Gondomar (III)
União da Madeira (III)	3–2 (aet)	Sporting de Espinho (III)
Pinhalnovense (III)	0–0 (aet, p. 5–4)	Moreirense (III)
União da Serra (III)	1–0	Arouca (III)
Oriental (III)	3–1	Eléctrico (III)
Tirsense (III)	4–1	Oliveira do Douro (IV)
Tondela (III)	6–1	Andorinha (IV)

Home team	Score	Away team
Atlético CP (III)	1–0	Fabril (IV)
Padroense (III)	4–3	Alcochetense (IV)
Aliados do Lordelo (III)	2–1	1º Dezembro (IV)
Caniçal (IV)	0–4	Vieira (III)
Oliveira do Bairro (III)	4–3 (aet)	Esperança de Lagos (IV)
Mêda (IV)	0–1	Monsanto (III)
Oeiras (IV)	3–1	Tourizense (III)
Mineiro Aljustrelense (IV)	2–1	Juventude de Évora (IV)
Milheiroense (IV)	1–2	Merelinense (III)
Operário (III)	2–1	Benfica e Castelo Branco (IV)
Casa Pia (IV)	1–0	Lusitânia (IV)
Nelas (IV)	0–0 (aet, p. 4–2)	S. João de Ver (IV)
Peniche (IV)	0–1	Vigor da Mocidade (IV)
Cruzado Canicense (IV)	1–0 (aet)	Estrela da Calheta (IV)
Mirandela (IV)	3–4	Cinfães (IV)
Sintrense (IV)	0–0 (aet, p. 5–4)	Fão (IV)
Torre de Moncorvo (IV)	2–1	Lusitano de Évora (IV)
Pescadores (IV)	3–0	Atlético do Tojal (IV)
Coimbrőes (IV)	1–0	Quarteirense (IV)
Machico (IV)	2–0	Torreense (IV)
Alcaíns (IV)	3–0	Farense (IV)
Fiães (IV)	0–0 (aet, p. 2–3)	Leça (IV)
Valenciano (IV)	3–2	Fornos de Algodres (IV)
Fátima (II)	3–0	Ribeira Brava (IV)

== Third round ==
In this round entered teams from Liga Sagres (1st level) and the winners from the second round. The matches were played on October 17 and 18, 2009.

Home team	Score	Away team
Rio Ave	2–1	Esmoriz (III)
Camacha (III)	3–1	Paredes (III)
Vitória de Guimarães	3–1	Feirense (II)
Académica de Coimbra	2–1	Portimonense (II)
Beira-Mar (II)	4–0	Torre de Moncorvo (IV)
Varzim (II)	1–2	Nacional
Tondela (III)	1–2	Oliveirense (II)
Gil Vicente (II)	6–1	Nelas (IV)
Leça (IV)	0–3	Desportivo de Chaves (II)
Sporting da Covilhã (II)	0–1	Braga
Freamunde (II)	3–0	Carregado (II)
Sporting CP	3–0	Penafiel (II)
Fátima (II)	3–0	Vila Meã (IV)
Santa Clara (II)	2–1	Marítimo
Vieira (III)	0–1 (aet)	Mafra (III)
Porto	4–0	Sertanense (III)

Home team	Score	Away team
União da Madeira (III)	2–0	Alcaíns (IV)
Sintrense (IV)	0–0 (a.e.t.), p. 3–4)	Pinhalnovense (III)
União da Serra (III)	3–2	Coimbrões (IV)
Belenenses	3–1	Oriental (III)
Tirsense (III)	1–0	Oliveira do Bairro (III)
Atlético CP (III)	0–2	Vitória de Setúbal
Naval	1–0 (aet)	Padroense (III)
Aliados do Lordelo (III)	2–0 (aet)	Machico (IV)
Monsanto (III)	0–6	Benfica
Oeiras (IV)	6–1	Operário (III)
Paços de Ferreira	3–1	Mineiro Aljustrelense (IV)
Merelinense (III)	1–2	União de Leiria
Leixões	2–1	Casa Pia (IV)
Cruzado Canicense (IV)	1–4	Vigor da Mocidade (IV)
Cinfães (IV)	1–1 (aet, p. 1–3)	Pescadores (IV)
Valenciano (IV)	1–1 (aet, p. 4–2)	Olhanense

== Fourth round ==
The matches were played on 22 November 2009 and 2 January 2010.

Team 1	Score	Team 2
Valenciano (IV)	0–1	Belenenses
Oeiras (IV)	1–2	Pinhalnovense (III)
Camacha (III)	1–0	Vigor da Mocidade (IV)
Naval	3–2 (a.e.t.)	Gil Vicente (II)
Mafra (III)	1–1 (a.e.t.), p.3–2)	União da Madeira (III)
Aliados do Lordelo (III)	1–0	Leixões
Oliveirense (II)	0–2	Porto
Braga	3–0	Vitória de Setúbal
Desportivo de Chaves (II)	2–0	União da Serra (III)
Académica de Coimbra	1–2 (a.e.t.)	Beira-Mar (II)
Benfica	0–1	Vitória de Guimarães
Tirsense (III)	0–0 (a.e.t.), p.9 –10)	Paços de Ferreira
Nacional	0–0 (a.e.t.), p.4–3)	Fátima (II)
Rio Ave	1–0	Santa Clara (II)
Pescadores (IV)	1–4	Sporting CP
Freamunde (II)	3–2 (a.e.t.)	União de Leiria

== Fifth round ==
The matches were played on 20 and 24 January 2010.

Team 1	Score	Team 2
Sporting CP	4–3	Mafra (III)
Nacional	1–2	Paços de Ferreira
Camacha (III)	0–1	Pinhalnovense (III)
Rio Ave	2–2 (a.e.t.), p.4–2)	Vitória de Guimarães
Aliados do Lordelo (III)	0–1	Naval
Freamunde (II)	1–3	Braga
Desportivo de Chaves (II)	1–0	Beira-Mar (II)
Belenenses	2–2 (a.e.t.), p.9–10)	Porto

== Quarter-finals ==
The matches were played on 2, 3 and 4 February 2010.

Team 1	Score	Team 2
Porto	5–2	Sporting CP
Pinhalnovense (III)	1–3	Naval
Braga	0–0 (a.e.t.), p. 5–6)	Rio Ave
Paços de Ferreira	1–2	Desportivo de Chaves (II)

== Semi-finals ==
=== Final phase bracket ===
Teams that are listed first play at home in the first leg.

Semi-finals; 23/24 March 2010; 13/14 April 2010
Chaves	1	2	3
Naval	0	1	1
Rio Ave	1	0	1
Porto	3	4	7

Final; 16 May 2010
Chaves	1
Porto	2

Team 1	Agg.	Team 2	1st leg	2nd leg
Chaves	3–1	Naval	1–0	2–1
Rio Ave	1–7	Porto	1–3	0–4

=== First legs ===
23 March 2010
18:15 UTC+0

Chaves	1–0	Naval
Rocha 90+4'

Estádio Municipal de Chaves, Chaves

24 March 2010
20:15 UTC+0

Rio Ave	1–3	Porto
Moraes 37'		Rúben Micael 20'; Meireles 54'; Guarín 76'

Estádio do Rio Ave FC, Vila do Conde

=== Second legs ===
13 April 2010

Naval	1–2	Chaves
Fábio Júnior 15'		Edu 110', 120'

Estádio Municipal José Bento Pessoa, Figueira da Foz

14 April 2010

Porto	4–0	Rio Ave
Belluschi 21'; Guarín 79'; Rúben Micael 86'; Falcao 90+2'

Estádio do Dragão, Porto

== Final ==
16 May 2010
17:00 UTC

Chaves	1–2	Porto
Clemente 85'	Report	Guarín 13'; Falcao 23'

Estádio Nacional, Oeiras
Attendance: 23,400
Referee: Pedro Proença

== Top scorers ==
Rank	Player	Club	Goals
1	(Colombia) Radamel Falcao	Porto	5
3	(Brazil) Lima	Belenenses	4
3	(Senegal) Mbaye Diop	Chaves	4
4	(Brazil) Beré	Sporting da Covilhã	3
4	(Colombia) Fredy Guarín	Porto	3
4	(Portugal) Liédson	Sporting CP	3
4	(Portugal) Rúben Micael	Nacional	3
4	(Brazil) William	Paços de Ferreira	3
4	(China) Zhang Chengdong	Mafra	3

Last updated: 27 January 2013
