= João Fernandes =

João Fernandes may refer to:

- João Fernandes (explorer), Portuguese explorer of the 15th century
- João Pedro Matos Fernandes (born 1967), Portuguese politician
- João Fernandes (footballer, born 1983), Portuguese footballer
- João Paulo Fernandes (boccia) (born 1984), Portuguese Paralympic boccia player
- João Paulo Fernandes (footballer)
- João Fernandes Lavrador (1453–1505), Portuguese explorer of the late 15th century
- João Fernandes (cinematographer), cinematographer also known as Raoul Lomas
- João Fernandes (rower) (born 1976), Portuguese Olympic rower
- João Fernandes (footballer, born 2000), Portuguese footballer
