= Paulo Clemente =

Portuguese footballer

Personal information
- Full name: Paulo Clemente Ventura Raimundo
- Date of birth: 14 October 1983 (age 43)
- Place of birth: Ponta Delgada, Portugal
- Height: 1.78 m (5 ft 10 in)
- Position: Forward

Youth career
- 1995–2001: Operário

Senior career*
Years	Team	Apps	(Gls)
2001–2005	Operário	84	(19)
2005–2007	Louletano	43	(14)
2007–2008	Gondomar	14	(2)
2008–2010	Chaves	79	(25)
2010–2012	Oliveirense	54	(6)
2012–2013	Arouca	35	(3)
2013–2014	Chaves	16	(1)
2014	Farense	18	(2)
2014–2019	Santa Clara	161	(44)
Total		504	(116)
- * Club domestic league appearances and goals

Paulo Clemente Ventura Raimundo (born 14 October 1983), known as Clemente, is a Portuguese former professional footballer who played as a forward.

Over ten seasons, he amassed Segunda Liga totals of 323 games and 62 goals, representing six clubs. He appeared in the Primeira Liga with Santa Clara (three matches).

== Club career ==
Born in Ponta Delgada, Azores, Clemente began his career with boyhood club CD Operário, spending three seasons in the third division and one in the fourth. In 2005, he left for another side in the latter tier, Louletano DC.

Clemente first reached the professionals in the 2007–08 campaign, competing with Gondomar S.C. in the Segunda Liga. In January 2008 he returned to division three, signing for G.D. Chaves and scoring 13 goals in his first full season to help the northerners promote as champions.

Chaves was immediately relegated in 2009–10, but the team managed to reach the final of the Taça de Portugal, with Clemente contributing five games and one goal, which came precisely in the decisive match against FC Porto, who won it 2–1.

Clemente continued playing in the second tier the following seasons, with U.D. Oliveirense and F.C. Arouca. In June 2013, following the latter's promotion to the Primeira Liga, he was released; on the 24th, he returned to former club Chaves also in the second division.

In early January 2014, Clemente parted ways with the Flavienses, moving to fellow league team S.C. Farense shortly after. He joined C.D. Santa Clara in the ensuing off-season, scoring seven goals in the 2017–18 season to help them return to the top flight after a 15-year absence, as runners-up.

Clemente's maiden appearance in the Portuguese top division took place on 22 September 2018 at the age of 34 years and 11 months, when he came on as a second-half substitute in the 1–3 home loss to Rio Ave FC. As the campaign was drawing to an end, both he and teammate Danildo Accioly announced they would retire and become part of Santa Clara's coaching staff.
