= Rúben Rodrigues =

Rúben Rodrigues may refer to:

- Rúben Rodrigues (footballer, born 1987), Portuguese footballer who plays as a forward
- Rúben Rodrigues (footballer, born 1996), Portuguese footballer who plays as a forward
