= Ricardo Rocha (footballer, born 1982) =

Portuguese footballer

Personal information
- Full name: Ricardo Nuno Oliveira da Rocha
- Date of birth: 18 November 1982 (age 43)
- Place of birth: Matosinhos, Portugal
- Height: 1.86 m (6 ft 1 in)
- Position: Centre-back

Youth career
- 1991–1997: Boavista
- 1997–1998: Vilar do Pinheiro
- 1998–1999: Boavista
- 1999: Candal
- 2000: Boavista
- 2000–2001: Infesta

Senior career*
| Years | Team | Apps | (Gls) |
| 2001–2002 | Infesta | 11 | (0) |
| 2002–2003 | Pedrouços | | |
| 2003–2005 | Infesta | 8 | (0) |
| 2005–2006 | Pedras Rubras | 24 | (2) |
| 2006–2007 | Vila Meã | 26 | (2) |
| 2007–2011 | Chaves | 102 | (8) |
| 2011 | Beira-Mar | 4 | (0) |
| 2011–2013 | Covilhã | 47 | (2) |
| 2013–2014 | Chaves | 33 | (1) |
| 2014 | Tondela | 0 | (0) |
| 2015 | Oliveirense | 14 | (1) |
| 2015–2016 | Benfica Castelo Branco | 30 | (2) |
| 2016–2017 | Salgueiros | 26 | (2) |
| Total | | 325 | (20) |
- * Club domestic league appearances and goals

Ricardo Nuno Oliveira da Rocha (born 18 November 1982) is a Portuguese former professional footballer who played as a central defender.

== Club career ==
Born in Matosinhos, Rocha competed in the lower leagues until the age of 26, reaching the Liga de Honra with G.D. Chaves in 2009–10; he had signed for the side in 2007 from AC Vila Meã. He made his second-division debut on 16 August 2009 by featuring the full 90 minutes in a 0–1 home loss against C.D. Feirense, and contributed a further 23 appearances as the season ended in relegation. Additionally, he was part of the squad that reached the final of the Taça de Portugal, being sent off in the last minute of the 2–1 defeat to FC Porto.

Rocha left Chaves in late January 2011, and joined Primeira Liga club S.C. Beira-Mar on a free transfer. After failing to establish himself, he returned to the second tier with S.C. Covilhã in the summer.

In another January transfer window move, and again as a free agent, Rocha went back to Chaves in 2013. He started in all his appearances in his first year, helping the side to promote from division three as champions.

== Honours ==
Chaves

- Segunda Divisão: 2012–13
- Taça de Portugal runner-up: 2009–10
