= Lixa (footballer) =

French association football player (born 1977)

Personal information
- Full name: Domingos Alexandrino Fonseca Gomes
- Date of birth: 22 January 1977 (age 49)
- Place of birth: Cape Verde
- Position: Winger

Senior career*
Years	Team	Apps	(Gls)
1996–1998	Sintrense		
1998–1999	Felgueiras	34	(8)
1999–2002	Vitória de Guimarães	27	(0)
2003	Maia	13	(1)
2003–2004	Felgueiras	26	(5)
2004–2005	Atlético Clube de Portugal		
2005–2006	Odivelas		

International career
2004–2005	Cape Verde	7	(0)
- * Club domestic league appearances and goals

Domingos Alexandrino Fonseca Gomes (born 22 January 1977) is a Cape Verde football former footballer who last played as a winger for Odivelas.

== Early life ==
Lixa was born in 1977 in Cape Verde and moved to Bairro da Cruz Vermelha in Portugal at a young age, where he started playing football.

== Club career ==
In 1999, Lixa signed for Portuguese side Vitória de Guimarães.

== International career ==
Lixa represented Portugal internationally at youth level and was regarded as "one of the most exciting names in Portuguese football".

== Style of play ==
Lixa mainly operated as a winger and was known for speed and dribbling ability.

== Post-playing career ==
After retiring from professional football, Lixa worked as a receptionist at a hotel in Paris, France.
