= Christopher Pilar =

French footballer (born 1985)

Christopher
Personal information
- Full name: Christopher de Almeida Pilar
- Date of birth: 29 March 1985 (age 41)
- Place of birth: Dijon, France
- Height: 1.85 m (6 ft 1 in)
- Position: Goalkeeper

Youth career
- 2001–2004: Sporting

Senior career*
Years	Team	Apps	(Gls)
2004–2005	Torreense	1	(0)
2005–2010	Marítimo	0	(0)
2010–2014	União da Madeira	26	(0)
2015	Ribeirão	11	(0)
2015–2017	Camacha	24	(0)
- * Club domestic league appearances and goals

Christopher de Almeida Pilar, known as Christopher (born 29 March 1985) is a French retired football player.

== Club career ==
He made his professional debut in the Segunda Liga for União da Madeira on 22 September 2011 in a game against Trofense.
