= João Botelho (footballer) =

Portuguese footballer

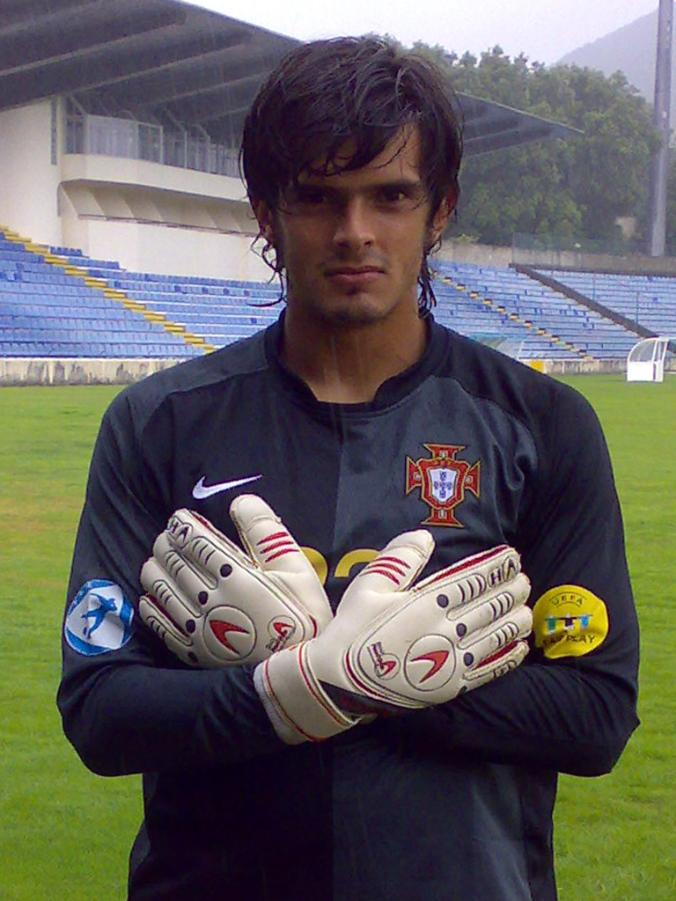

Personal information
- Full name: João Manuel Raposo Botelho
- Date of birth: 22 September 1985 (age 41)
- Place of birth: Ponta Delgada, Portugal
- Height: 1.83 m (6 ft 0 in)
- Position: Goalkeeper

Youth career
- 1995–2004: Santa Clara

Senior career*
Years	Team	Apps	(Gls)
2004–2010	Santa Clara	55	(0)
2010–2011	Camacha	17	(0)
2011–2013	Operário	53	(0)
2013	Santa Clara	0	(0)
2013–2015	Operário	50	(0)
2015–2016	Santa Clara	17	(0)
2017–2018	Operário	27	(0)
2018–2021	Micaelense	22	(0)
- * Club domestic league appearances and goals as of 18:10, 15 May 2020 (UTC)

João Manuel Raposo Botelho (born 22 September 1985) is a Portuguese footballer who plays as a goalkeeper.

== Club career ==
Born in Ponta Delgada, Azores, Botelho was a product of local C.D. Santa Clara's youth system, making his first-team debut in 2003–04 (one match in the Segunda Liga). In the following seasons, with the side also in that level, he backed up Nuno Santos for two years before being first choice the same amount of time.

In 2008–09, with Santa Clara in the same tier, Botelho again appeared as understudy, now to Alemão. In the following campaign more of the same befell, after the signing of English Matt Jones (no league matches).

Botelho resumed his career in division three, with A.D. Camacha and CD Operário. In the summer of 2013 he returned to Santa Clara but, in December of the same year, re-joined his previous club.

== International career ==
Botelho appeared for the Portuguese under-21 team at the 2007 UEFA European Championship in the Netherlands, as backup to Paulo Ribeiro. He did not leave the bench during the competition, and never won caps for that or any category.
