= Gonçalo Reyes =

Portuguese footballer

Personal information
- Full name: Gonçalo Miguel Reyes Dias
- Date of birth: 30 January 1993 (age 33)
- Place of birth: Almada, Portugal
- Height: 1.78 m (5 ft 10 in)
- Position: Midfielder

Team information
- Current team: Operário
- Number: 20

Youth career
- 2002–2003: Pescadores Caparica
- 2003–2010: Benfica
- 2010–2012: Vitória Setúbal

Senior career*
Years	Team	Apps	(Gls)
2011–2014	Vitória Setúbal	6	(0)
2013–2014	→ Casa Pia (loan)	29	(2)
2014–2016	Marítimo B	61	(1)
2016–2018	Operário	58	(7)
2018–2019	Pinhalnovense	13	(0)
2019	Loures	2	(0)
2019–2020	Ideal	23	(0)
2020–	Operário	11	(0)

International career
2008	Portugal U16	3	(0)
- * Club domestic league appearances and goals as of 1 August 2021

Gonçalo Miguel Reyes Dias (born 30 January 1993) is a Portuguese footballer who plays for CD Operário, as a midfielder.

== Career ==
Born in Cova da Piedade, Almada, to a mother from Chile, Reyes spent most of his youth career in the ranks of S.L. Benfica and concluded it at Vitória FC. He made his debut in the Primeira Liga on 6 January 2012 in a 1–1 home draw with Académica de Coimbra, as a substitute for the last eight minutes in place of Bruno Gallo.

After 18 months on loan at Casa Pia A.C. in the third tier, Reyes signed for C.S. Marítimo B of the Segunda Liga on 31 July 2014. On 1 November, he scored his only professional goal in a 2–1 home win over S.C. Covilhã.

Marítimo B were relegated in Reyes' first season, and he continued to play for them in the third, where he would go on to represent CD Operário, C.D. Pinhalnovense, G.S. Loures and S.C. Ideal.

Internationally, Reyes played three games for Portugal at under-16 level.
