= Maximiliano Ré =

Argentine-Italian footballer

Maxi Ré
Personal information
- Full name: Maximiliano Ré
- Date of birth: 23 March 1987 (age 39)
- Place of birth: Rosario, Argentina
- Height: 1.78 m (5 ft 10 in)
- Position: Midfielder

Team information
- Current team: Club Atletico Tiro Federal Argentino

Youth career
- Rosario Central
- 2007–2008: Siena

Senior career*
Years	Team	Apps	(Gls)
2008–2009	Siena	0	(0)
2009	→ Colligiana (loan)	4	(0)
2009–2010	Ibiza-Eivissa	?	(?)
2010	Izarra	4	(0)
- * Club domestic league appearances and goals

Maximiliano Ré (born 23 March 1987) is an Argentine-Italian footballer.

== Biography ==
Re started his career at hometown club Rosario Central. In August 2007, he was signed by Siena, where he played at Primavera Team, and call-up to Torneo di Viareggio 2008.

In February 2009, he was loaned to Colligiana. His teammate Rodrigo De Lazzari also moved to the club on free transfer.

In summer 2009, he went to Spanish regional league side UD Ibiza-Eivissa.
In the winter transfer 2010 signing for the CD Izarra though he plays a few minutes.
