= Joazimar Stehb =

Cape Verdean footballer

Personal information
- Full name: Joazimar Sequeira Conceição
- Date of birth: 26 January 1991 (age 35)
- Place of birth: Tarrafal de São Nicolau, Cape Verde
- Height: 1.76 m (5 ft 9 1/2 in)
- Position: Forward

Team information
- Current team: GD Fontinhas
- Number: 91

Youth career
- 2009–2010: Marítimo

Senior career*
Years	Team	Apps	(Gls)
2009	Batuque		
2010–2011	Pontassolense		
2011–2012	Marítimo B		
2012–2013	Oeiras	29	(0)
2013–2015	Operário	61	(16)
2015–2016	Atlético CP	31	(0)
2016–2018	Praiense	52	(4)
2018–2019	Vilafranquense	24	(3)
2019	Louletano	10	(0)
2019–2020	SC Ideal	10	(0)
2020–	GD Fontinhas	17	(0)

International career
2011	Cape Verde	1	(0)
- * Club domestic league appearances and goals as of 16:51, 11 April 2021 (UTC)

Joazimar Sequeira Conceição, known as Joazimar Stehb (born 26 January 1991) is a Cape Verdean football player who plays for GD Fontinhas.

== Club career ==
He made his professional debut in the Segunda Liga for Atlético CP on 8 August 2015 in a game against Freamunde.
