= Laurindo Tavares =

Portuguese footballer (born 1982)

Laurindo
Personal information
- Full name: Laurindo António Leal Tavares
- Date of birth: 15 June 1982 (age 44)
- Place of birth: Lisbon, Portugal
- Height: 1.73 m (5 ft 8 in)
- Position: Midfielder

Youth career
- 1997–1998: Operário Lisboa
- 1998–2001: Estrela Amadora

Senior career*
Years	Team	Apps	(Gls)
2001–2003	Real Massamá	57	(5)
2003–2004	Estrela Vendas Novas	36	(3)
2004–2006	Odivelas	49	(4)
2006–2008	Olivais Moscavide	47	(2)
2008–2009	Olympiakos Nicosia		
2009–2010	Pinhalnovense	28	(2)
2010–2012	Atlético	59	(9)
2012–2013	Arouca	32	(0)
2013–2014	Oliveirense	37	(0)
2014–2016	Mafra	59	(4)
2016–2017	Pinhalnovense	25	(0)
2017–2018	Oriental	26	(1)
Total		455	(30)
- * Club domestic league appearances and goals

Laurindo António Leal Tavares (born 15 June 1982 in Lisbon), known simply as Laurindo, is a Portuguese former professional footballer who played as a midfielder.
