= Vitinha (disambiguation) =

Vitinha (Vítor Machado Ferreira, born February 2000) is a Portuguese football midfielder.

Vitinha, a hypocorism of Vítor in Portuguese, may also refer to:

- Vitinha (futsal player) (born 1969) (Vítor Manuel da Silva Marques, born 1969), Portuguese futsal player
- Vitinha (footballer, born 1986) (Vítor Tiago de Freitas Fernandes, born 1986), Portuguese football defender
- Vitinha (footballer, born 1991) (Vítor Reis Alves, born 1991), Portuguese football midfielder
- Vitinha (footballer, born 1992) (Vítor Hugo Silva Azevedo, born 1992), Portuguese football midfielder
- Vitinha (footballer, born 1999) (Vítor Hugo de Almeida Tavares, born 1999), Portuguese football defender
- Vitinha (footballer, born March 2000) (Vítor Manuel Carvalho Oliveira, born March 2000), Portuguese football forward
