= Rúben Nunes =

Portuguese footballer

Personal information
- Full name: Rúben Filipe Oliveira Nunes
- Date of birth: 15 April 1992 (age 34)
- Place of birth: Lisbon, Portugal
- Height: 1.80 m (5 ft 11 in)
- Position: Defender

Team information
- Current team: Pinhalnovense
- Number: 14

Youth career
- 2003–2004: Pescadores
- 2004–2009: Benfica
- 2009–2011: Vitória de Setúbal

Senior career*
| Years | Team | Apps | (Gls) |
| 2011–2012 | Pescadores | 1 | (0) |
| 2012–2016 | Cova da Piedade | 83 | (4) |
| 2017– | Pinhalnovense | 10 | (0) |
- * Club domestic league appearances and goals as of 15 April 2017

Rúben Filipe Oliveira Nunes (born 15 April 1992) is a Portuguese footballer who plays for C.D. Pinhalnovense as a defender.

== Club career ==
On 26 October 2016, Nunes made his professional debut with Cova da Piedade in a 2016–17 Taça da Liga match against Arouca.
