= Luís Alves =

Portuguese footballer

Personal information
- Full name: Luís Manuel Rodrigues Alves
- Date of birth: 28 September 1971 (age 55)
- Place of birth: Lisbon, Portugal
- Position: Forward

Youth career
- 1984–1990: Odivelas

Senior career*
Years	Team	Apps	(Gls)
1990–1991	Odivelas		
1991–1992	Sacavenense		
1992–1993	Portosantense		
1993–1994	Odivelas		
1994–1997	Nacional	37	(7)
1997–1998	União Montemor	32	(2)
1998–1999	Seixal	32	(5)
1999–2000	Câmara Lobos	31	(9)
2000–2001	Nacional	10	(0)
2001–2002	Camacha	35	(17)
2002–2005	Pontassolense	79	(39)
2005–2006	Caniçal		
2006–2007	Câmara Lobos		
Total		256+	(79+)
- * Club domestic league appearances and goals

Luís Manuel Rodrigues Alves OLY (born 28 September 1971) is a Portuguese retired footballer who played as a forward.

== Football career ==
Born in Lisbon, Alves spent the majority of his career playing for third division clubs. He made his professional debuts in the 1990–91 season, with Odivelas F.C. in the fourth division.

Alves first came to prominence in 1999–2000, scoring nine goals for C.S.D. Câmara de Lobos in the third level and subsequently earning a contract with C.D. Nacional of division two, where he appeared sparingly over the course of three campaigns, being relegated in his second.

In the 2001 summer, after a failed second stint with Nacional, Alves moved to another team in Madeira, A.D. Camacha, netting 16 goals in his only season. He then signed for his fifth club in the region, A.D. Pontassolense (also in the third tier), where he repeated individual numbers in his first year.

In 2003–04, 32-year-old Alves scored 15 goals for Pontassolense, thus becoming the third division – south zone – runner-up topscorer behind S.C. Olhanense's Edinho. He only found the net five times in the following campaign and, subsequently, moved to amateur football where he played a couple of years for two sides before retiring.
