= Tiago Maia =

Portuguese footballer

Personal information
- Full name: Tiago Manuel da Silva Maia
- Date of birth: 18 September 1992 (age 34)
- Place of birth: Gondomar, Portugal
- Height: 1.83 m (6 ft 0 in)
- Position: Goalkeeper

Team information
- Current team: Olhanense

Youth career
- 2002–2011: Porto
- 2007–2008: → Padroense (loan)

Senior career*
Years	Team	Apps	(Gls)
2011–2012	Santa Clara	0	(0)
2013–2014	Espinho	20	(0)
2014–2016	Olhanense	18	(0)
2016–2020	Praiense	110	(0)
2020–2021	Louletano	9	(0)
2021–2022	Moncarapachense	18	(0)
2022–	Olhanense	55	(0)

International career
2009	Portugal U18	4	(0)
2010−2011	Portugal U19	20	(0)
2012	Portugal U20	3	(0)
Medal record
Men's football
Representing Portugal
FIFA U-20 World Cup
Runner-up	2011 Colombia
- * Club domestic league appearances and goals as of 09:08, 3 September 2026 (UTC)

Tiago Manuel da Silva Maia CvIH (born 18 September 1992) is a Portuguese footballer who plays as a goalkeeper for S.C. Olhanense.

== Club career ==
Born in Gondomar, Porto District, Maia was brought up at FC Porto. He spent the vast majority of his senior career in the third division, representing S.C. Espinho, S.C. Praiense and Louletano DC.

The exception to this happened in the 2014–15 and 2015–16 seasons, when Maia played with S.C. Olhanense in the Segunda Liga. His first appearance in the competition took place on 9 August 2014, in a 2–0 home win against Leixões SC.

Maia did not represent a club in the 2012–13 campaign.

== International career ==
Maia was part of the Portugal under-20 squad that finished second at the 2011 FIFA World Cup, playing no matches in the tournament held in Colombia.

== Honours ==
Portugal U20

- FIFA U-20 World Cup runner-up: 2011

Orders

- Knight of the Order of Prince Henry
