= Diogo Moniz =

Portuguese footballer

Personal information
- Full name: Diogo Pereira Moniz
- Date of birth: 24 January 1993 (age 33)
- Place of birth: Povoação, Portugal
- Height: 1.80 m (5 ft 11 in)
- Positions: Midfielder; defender

Team information
- Current team: Praiense
- Number: 8

Youth career
- 2004–2006: Mira Mar
- 2007–2012: Santa Clara

Senior career*
Years	Team	Apps	(Gls)
2012–2014	Santa Clara	13	(0)
2014	→ Santiago (loan)		
2014–	Praiense	91	(4)
- * Club domestic league appearances and goals as of 22:42, 21 October 2019 (UTC)

Diogo Pereira Moniz (born 24 January 1993) is a Portuguese football player who plays for Praiense.

== Club career ==
He made his professional debut in the Segunda Liga for Santa Clara on 3 March 2013 in a game against Vitória Guimarães B.
