= Daniel Casaleiro =

Portuguese footballer

Personal information
- Full name: Daniel Alexandre Calado Casaleiro
- Date of birth: 2 November 1989 (age 36)
- Place of birth: Entroncamento, Portugal
- Height: 1.84 m (6 ft 0 in)
- Position: Goalkeeper

Team information
- Current team: Pescadores

Youth career
- 1998–2004: CADE
- 2004–2008: Benfica

Senior career*
Years	Team	Apps	(Gls)
2008–2011	Chaves	12	(0)
2012–2013	Amiense	18	(0)
2014–2015	Atlético Reguengos	6	(0)
2017–	Pescadores	2	(0)
Total		38	(0)

International career
2005	Portugal U16	1	(0)
- * Club domestic league appearances and goals as of 10 December 2017

Daniel Alexandre Calado Casaleiro (born 2 November 1989 in Entroncamento, Santarém District) is a Portuguese footballer who plays as a goalkeeper for G.D.P. Costa de Caparica.
