= João Fernandes (footballer, born 2000) =

Portuguese footballer

Personal information
- Full name: João Francisco Pereira Fernandes
- Date of birth: 14 November 2000 (age 25)
- Place of birth: Funchal, Portugal
- Height: 1.80 m (5 ft 11 in)
- Position: Forward

Team information
- Current team: Camacha
- Number: 7

Youth career
- 2009–2019: Nacional

Senior career*
Years	Team	Apps	(Gls)
2019–2022	Nacional	2	(0)
2020	→ Camacha (loan)	3	(0)
2021	→ União de Santarém (loan)	12	(0)
2021–2022	→ Camacha (loan)	11	(0)
2022–	Camacha	15	(0)
- * Club domestic league appearances and goals as of 12 February 2023

João Francisco Pereira Fernandes (born 14 November 2000) is a Portuguese footballer who plays for Camacha, as a forward.

== Football career ==
He made his professional debut for Nacional on 12 January 2020 in the LigaPro.
