= Rui Rêgo =

Portuguese footballer (born 1980)

Personal information
- Full name: Rui Manuel Castanheira do Rêgo
- Date of birth: 5 July 1980 (age 46)
- Place of birth: Mujães, Portugal
- Height: 1.76 m (5 ft 9 in)
- Position: Goalkeeper

Youth career
- 1991–1996: Vila Fria
- 1996–1999: Braga

Senior career*
| Years | Team | Apps | (Gls) |
| 1999–2004 | Braga B | 103 | (0) |
| 2003 | → Marco (loan) | 2 | (0) |
| 2005 | Valenciano | 11 | (0) |
| 2005–2006 | Torre Moncorvo | | |
| 2006–2007 | Lixa | 20 | (0) |
| 2007–2010 | Chaves | 97 | (0) |
| 2010–2015 | Beira-Mar | 155 | (0) |
| 2015–2016 | Vilaverdense | 28 | (0) |
| 2016–2021 | Merelinense | 122 | (0) |
| Total | | 538 | (0) |
- * Club domestic league appearances and goals

Rui Manuel Castanheira do Rêgo (born 5 July 1980 in Mujães, Viana do Castelo) is a Portuguese former professional footballer who played as a goalkeeper.
