= Alemão (footballer, born February 1982) =

Portuguese footballer (born 1982)

Personal information
- Full name: Paulo Jorge Sousa Vieira
- Date of birth: 16 February 1982 (age 44)
- Place of birth: Paris, France
- Height: 1.84 m (6 ft 0 in)
- Position: Goalkeeper

Team information
- Current team: Vitória Setúbal (goalkeeper coach)

Youth career
- 1991–1995: União Leiria
- 1995–1997: Boavista
- 1997–1999: Académica
- 1999–2001: Sporting CP

Senior career*
Years	Team	Apps	(Gls)
2001–2003	Sporting CP B	29	(0)
2003–2004	Marítimo B	15	(0)
2004–2005	Benfica Castelo Branco	31	(0)
2005–2006	Tourizense	24	(0)
2007–2008	União Leiria	0	(0)
2008–2009	Santa Clara	21	(0)
2009–2011	Atromitos	51	(0)
2011	Othellos	11	(0)
2012–2013	União Santiago		
2013–2014	Praia de Milfontes	4	(0)
2017–2019	Lagoa	18	(0)
Total		204	(0)
- * Club domestic league appearances and goals

Paulo Jorge Sousa Vieira (born 16 February 1982), known as Alemão ("German"), is a Portuguese former professional footballer who played as a goalkeeper.

== Playing career ==
Born in Paris, France to Portuguese parents, Alemão started his professional career with Sporting CP after emerging through the Lisbon club's youth ranks. He would only, however, appear for the reserves during his spell, meeting the same fate in 2003–04 with C.S. Marítimo – both teams operated in the third division.

In the following two and a half seasons, Alemão stayed in that tier, playing for Sport Benfica e Castelo Branco and G.D. Tourizense. In January 2007 he was signed by U.D. Leiria of the Primeira Liga, but only managed to be third choice during his tenure.

Alemão moved to C.D. Santa Clara from the Segunda Liga for the 2008–09 campaign, starting ahead of longtime incumbent João Botelho. In the following year he had his first experience abroad, joining Cypriot Second Division side Atromitos Yeroskipou.

== Coaching career ==
Between 2014 and 2020, Alemão was a goalkeeper coach at two different football schools: at Escola Academia Sporting na Povoa de Stª Iria (2014-2017) and at Escola Futebol Benfica de Alverca (2017-2020). During the same period, he also worked for F.C. Alverca for a few years.

After working at the club's academy, Alemão was promoted to Amora's first team ahead of the 2022-23 season, where he would act as goalkeeper coach. In the summer of 2023 he was appointed goalkeeping coach at Vitória Setúbal

== Honours ==
Sporting

- Taça de Portugal: 2001–02
