= João Fernandes (footballer, born 1983) =

Portuguese footballer

Personal information
- Full name: João Miguel Afonso Fernandes
- Date of birth: 2 July 1983 (age 43)
- Place of birth: Chaves, Portugal
- Height: 1.78 m (5 ft 10 in)
- Position: Midfielder

Youth career
- 1998–2002: Chaves

Senior career*
| Years | Team | Apps | (Gls) |
| 2002–2006 | Chaves | 49 | (0) |
| 2002–2004 | → Valpaços (loan) | | |
| 2006–2007 | Feirense | 13 | (0) |
| 2007–2009 | Gondomar | 41 | (0) |
| 2009–2015 | Chaves | 95 | (1) |
| 2015 | → Pedras Salgadas (loan) | 15 | (1) |
| 2015–2016 | Mirandela | 29 | (0) |
| 2016–2022 | Montalegre | 123 | (2) |
| Total | | 365 | (4) |

Managerial career
- 2022–2024: Montalegre (fitness coach)
- 2024: Politehnica Iaşi (fitness coach)
- * Club domestic league appearances and goals

João Miguel Afonso Fernandes (born 2 July 1983) is a Portuguese former footballer who played as a midfielder. He is a fitness coach at Liga I club Politehnica Iaşi.

== Career ==
Fernandes made his professional debut in the Segunda Liga for Chaves on 26 September 2004 in a game against Leixões.

== Honours ==
Chaves

- Segunda Divisão: 2012–13
- Taça de Portugal runner-up: 2009–10
