= Hugo Simões =

Portuguese footballer (born 1986)

Personal information
- Full name: Hugo Tiago Villegas Simões
- Date of birth: 2 May 1986 (age 40)
- Place of birth: Lisbon, Portugal
- Height: 1.73 m (5 ft 8 in)
- Position: Left back

Youth career
- 1996–1998: Real Massamá
- 1998–2005: Estrela Amadora

Senior career*
Years	Team	Apps	(Gls)
2005–2006	Tourizense	12	(0)
2006–2007	Pampilhosa	19	(0)
2007–2008	Tourizense	31	(1)
2008–2009	Pampilhosa	15	(1)
2009	Lokomotiv Mezdra	11	(1)
2009	Enosis Neon	0	(0)
2010	Ayia Napa	8	(0)
2010–2011	PAEEK	14	(0)
2011–2012	Operário	26	(0)
2012–2013	Farense	15	(1)
2013–2014	Sertanense	29	(1)
2014–2015	Benfica Castelo Branco	27	(2)
2015–2018	Operário	79	(6)
2018–2020	SC Ideal	46	(2)
2020–2022	Operário	20	(0)
2022	SC Ideal	4	(0)

Managerial career
- 2024–2025: Puerto Cabello (assistant)
- * Club domestic league appearances and goals

Hugo Tiago Villegas Simões (born 2 May 1986 in Lisbon), known as Chileno, is a Portuguese former footballer who played as a left-back.

== Coaching career ==
In the second half of 2024, Simões served as the assistant coach of Iván Fernández Álvarez in Venezuelan club Academia Puerto Cabello.

== Personal life ==
Born in Portugal to a Chilean mother and a Portuguese father, Simões is known as Chileno.
