= 2002 Taça de Portugal final =

- Event: 2001–02 Taça de Portugal
Leixões	Sporting CP
0	1
- Date: 12 May 2002
- Venue: Estádio Nacional, Oeiras
- Man of the Match: Rui Bento (Sporting CP)
- Referee: Olegário Benquerença (Leiria)
- Attendance: 37,500

The 2002 Taça de Portugal final was the final match of the 2001–02 Taça de Portugal, the 62nd season of the Taça de Portugal, the premier Portuguese football cup competition organized by the Portuguese Football Federation (FPF). The match was played on 12 May 2002 at the Estádio Nacional in Oeiras, and opposed third division side Leixões and Sporting CP. Sporting CP defeated Leixões 1–0 to claim their thirteenth Taça de Portugal.

As Sporting CP claimed both league and cup double in the same season, cup runners-up Leixões faced their cup final opponents in the 2002 Supertaça Cândido de Oliveira at the Estádio do Bonfim in Setúbal.

== Match ==
=== Details ===
12 May 2002
17:00 WEST

Leixões	0–1	Sporting CP
		Jardel 40'

Estádio Nacional, Oeiras
Attendance: 37,500
Referee: Olegário Benquerença (Leiria)

Leixões	Sporting CP

GK	1	(Portugal) Fernando Ferreira
RB	2	(Portugal) Luís Barros		(substituted off) 62'
CB	3	(Portugal) Nuno Silva	(yellow card) 86'
CB	4	(Portugal) José António
LB	5	(Portugal) Sérgio Abreu
CM	10	(Bosnia and Herzegovina) Nail Beširović
CM	6	(France) Christopher Odé		(substituted off) 29'
RM	8	(Portugal) Pedras		(substituted off) 46'
AM	7	(Portugal) Abílio (c)
LM	9	(Brazil) Detinho
CF	11	(Gabon) Henri Antchouet
Substitutes:
GK	12	(Portugal) Chico
DF	13	(Portugal) Jorge Vilaça
DF	15	(Portugal) José Cerqueira		(substituted on) 62'
MF	14	(Portugal) Bruno China		(substituted on) 46'
MF	17	(Portugal) Calica
MF	18	(Portugal) Tozé		(substituted on) 29'
FW	16	(Portugal) Armando
Manager:
(Portugal) Carlos Carvalhal

GK	1	(Portugal) Nélson
RB	26	(Argentina) Facundo Quiroga
CB	22	(Portugal) Beto	(yellow card) 37'
CB	6	(Brazil) André Cruz	(yellow card) 10'
LB	23	(Portugal) Rui Jorge
CM	4	(Portugal) Rui Bento
CM	17	(Portugal) Paulo Bento		(substituted off) 88'
RM	8	(Portugal) Pedro Barbosa (c)		(substituted off) 84'
AM	25	(Portugal) João Pinto	(yellow card) 50'
LM	21	(Greece) Dimitris Nalitzis		(substituted off) 53'
CF	16	(Brazil) Mário Jardel
Substitutes:
GK	31	(Portugal) Alemão
DF	5	(Republic of Ireland) Phil Babb
DF	15	(Portugal) Hugo
DF	29	(Brazil) César Prates		(substituted on) 88'
MF	2	(Portugal) Diogo Matos
MF	20	(Portugal) Ricardo Quaresma		(substituted on) 84'
MF	45	(Portugal) Hugo Viana		(substituted on) 53'
Manager:
(Romania) László Bölöni

2001–02 Taça de Portugal Winners
Sporting CP
13th Title

- (Portugal) Rui Bento (Sporting CP)

Match officials

- Assistant referees:
  - Luís Marcelino (Leiria)
  - Artur Dinis
- Fourth official:

Match rules

- 90 minutes
- Penalty shoot-out if scores level after 90 minutes
- Seven named substitutes
- Maximum of three substitutions

== See also ==
- 2001–02 Sporting CP season
