= Bruno Grou =

Portuguese footballer

Personal information
- Full name: Bruno Martins Grou
- Date of birth: 25 December 1990 (age 35)
- Place of birth: Guimarães, Portugal
- Height: 1.79 m (5 ft 10 in)
- Position: Midfielder

Team information
- Current team: Pinhalnovense
- Number: 10

Youth career
- 2007–2009: Pinhalnovense

Senior career*
Years	Team	Apps	(Gls)
2008–2009	Pinhalnovense		
2009–2010	Sertanense	2	(0)
2010	Fabril Barreiro		
2011	Palmelense		
2011–2013	Pinhalnovense	46	(18)
2013–2014	Académico de Viseu	10	(0)
2014–2015	Sertanense	28	(1)
2015–	Pinhalnovense	56	(5)
- * Club domestic league appearances and goals as of 9 April 2017

Bruno Martins Grou (born 25 December 1990) is a Portuguese footballer who plays for Pinhalnovense as a midfielder.

== Career ==
On 15 August 2013, Grou made his professional debut with Académico de Viseu in a 2013–14 Segunda Liga match against Braga B.
