= Paulo Teles =

Portuguese footballer

Personal information
- Full name: Paulo Sérgio Rodrigues Teles
- Date of birth: 30 March 1993 (age 33)
- Place of birth: Funchal, Portugal
- Height: 1.77 m (5 ft 9 1/2 in)
- Position: Midfielder

Team information
- Current team: Camacha

Youth career
- 2002–2009: Marítimo
- 2009–2012: Benfica

Senior career*
Years	Team	Apps	(Gls)
2012–2014	Deportivo B	43	(4)
2013–2015	Deportivo La Coruña	4	(0)
2014	→ Guijuelo (loan)	8	(0)
2014–2015	→ Compostela (loan)	30	(3)
2016–2017	Lokomotiv Plovdiv	34	(1)
2018	Farense	1	(0)
2019–2020	Praiense	35	(4)
2021–	Camacha	15	(0)
- * Club domestic league appearances and goals as of 10:19, 17 May 2022 (UTC)

Paulo Sérgio Rodrigues Teles (born 30 March 1993) is a Portuguese footballer who plays as a central midfielder for A.D. Camacha.

== Club career ==
Born in Funchal, Madeira, Teles finished his youth career with S.L. Benfica, arriving in the club's academy at the age of 16. In August 2012 he moved to Spain, signing a contract with Deportivo de La Coruña and making his debut as a senior with the reserves in Tercera División.

Teles played his first competitive match with the Galicians' first team on 11 September 2013, starting in a 2–2 draw against Córdoba CF in the second round of the Copa del Rey. After loan spells at Segunda División B sides CD Guijuelo and SD Compostela, he was released on 8 August 2015.

On 20 February 2016, Teles joined Bulgarian team PFC Lokomotiv Plovdiv. He scored his only First Professional Football League goal on 10 April, in the 3–1 home victory over PFC Slavia Sofia.

Teles returned to his homeland in the summer of 2018, with S.C. Farense. He appeared in his only professional game in his country on 18 August, replacing Vanja Marković in the second half of a 3–1 away defeat of FC Porto B in the LigaPro.

Subsequently, Teles competed in the Portuguese lower leagues.
