= Eduardo Machado (footballer) =

Portuguese footballer

Personal information
- Full name: Eduardo José Borges Machado
- Date of birth: 26 April 1990 (age 36)
- Place of birth: Chaves, Portugal
- Height: 1.75 m (5 ft 9 in)
- Positions: Right-back; midfielder

Team information
- Current team: Santa Maria

Youth career
- 1998–2009: Chaves

Senior career*
Years	Team	Apps	(Gls)
2009–2013	Chaves	77	(2)
2013–2014	Freamunde	33	(3)
2014–2016	Tondela	52	(1)
2016	Chaves	8	(0)
2016–2020	Boavista	49	(0)
2020	→ Leixões (loan)	3	(0)
2020–2021	Leixões	22	(0)
2021–2022	Vilafranquense	19	(0)
2022–2023	Paredes	18	(1)
2023–2024	Montalegre	24	(2)
2024–	Santa Maria	41	(3)

International career
2011	Portugal U21	5	(0)
- * Club domestic league appearances and goals as of 19:11, 19 January 2026 (UTC)

Eduardo José Borges Machado (born 26 April 1990) is a Portuguese professional footballer who plays as a right-back or a right midfielder for Santa Maria.

== Club career ==
Born in Chaves, Machado played youth football with local club G.D. Chaves. He appeared in five Segunda Liga matches in 2009–10, when the team was relegated, then spent the following three seasons in the third division. On 13 April 2010, he scored twice to help defeat hosts Associação Naval 1º de Maio 2–1 in the second leg of the semi-finals of the Taça de Portugal, and also appeared in the final against FC Porto.

After spending the 2013–14 campaign also in the third tier with S.C. Freamunde, helping his side to be promoted as champions, Machado signed with C.D. Tondela in the summer of 2014. He contributed 41 games and one goal in his first year, in a first-ever promotion to the Primeira Liga.

Machado made his debut in the Portuguese top flight on 14 August 2015, playing 90 minutes in a 1–2 home loss against Sporting CP. The following transfer window, he was released and returned to Chaves.

On 26 May 2016, Machado joined Boavista FC. He missed the vast majority of 2017–18, due to an anterior cruciate ligament rupture to his right knee.

On 8 January 2020, Machado was loaned to Leixões S.C. of the second division until 30 June.

== International career ==
Machado won five caps for the Portugal under-21 side, all in 2011. His first came on 9 February, when he played the second half of the 3–1 friendly victory over Sweden in Cartaxo.
