= Luís Miguel (footballer, born 1991) =

Portuguese footballer

Personal information
- Full name: Luís Miguel Silva Mendonça
- Date of birth: 24 September 1991 (age 35)
- Place of birth: Porto da Cruz, Machico, Portugal
- Height: 1.83 m (6 ft 0 in)
- Position: Centre-back

Team information
- Current team: Camacha

Youth career
- 2006–2007: Santana
- 2007–2010: Marítimo

Senior career*
Years	Team	Apps	(Gls)
2010–2014	Marítimo B	25	(0)
2014–2015	Marítimo C	12	(2)
2015–2018	Camacha	91	(4)
2018–2020	União da Madeira	53	(0)
2020–	Camacha	0	(0)
- * Club domestic league appearances and goals as of 18:27, 23 August 2020 (UTC)

Luís Miguel Silva Mendonça, known as Luís Miguel (born 24 September 1991) is a Portuguese footballer who plays for A.D. Camacha as a centre-back.

== Career ==
On 17 March 2013, Luís Miguel made his professional debut with Marítimo B in a 2012–13 Segunda Liga match against Freamunde, when he replaced José Tiago (58th minute).
