= Rúben Rodrigues (footballer, born 1987) =

Portuguese footballer

Personal information
- Full name: Rúben Filipe Costa Rodrigues
- Date of birth: 2 June 1987 (age 39)
- Place of birth: Ponta Delgada, Portugal
- Height: 1.78 m (5 ft 10 in)
- Position: Forward

Team information
- Current team: Aljustrelense
- Number: 9

Youth career
- 1999–2006: Santa Clara

Senior career*
Years	Team	Apps	(Gls)
2006–2009	Santa Clara	21	(3)
2009–2011	Operário	33	(9)
2011–2013	Angrense	35	(13)
2013–2015	Praiense	53	(30)
2015–2016	Operário	23	(5)
2016–	Aljustrelense	19	(2)
- * Club domestic league appearances and goals as of 9 April 2017

Rúben Filipe Costa Rodrigues (born 2 June 1987) is a Portuguese footballer who plays for Aljustrelense as a forward.

== Career ==
Rodrigues made his professional debut in the Segunda Liga for Santa Clara on 18 February 2007 in a game against Feirense.
