= Pedro Franco (footballer, born 1974) =

Portuguese football coach and former player

Personal information
- Full name: Pedro Filipe Antunes Matias Silva Franco
- Date of birth: 18 April 1974 (age 52)
- Place of birth: Lisbon, Portugal
- Height: 1.82 m (5 ft 11 1/2 in)
- Position: Centre-back

Youth career
- 1985–1987: Sporting CP
- 1987–1988: Estrela Amadora
- 1988–1991: Musical Caneças
- 1991–1992: Odivelas

Senior career*
Years	Team	Apps	(Gls)
1992–1994	Odivelas	33	(1)
1994–1996	Nacional	40	(2)
1996–1997	Leça	19	(0)
1997–1998	Maia	26	(1)
1998–1999	Leça	8	(0)
1999–2000	União Madeira	25	(1)
2000	Penafiel	7	(0)
2000–2002	Leça	50	(1)
2002–2005	Rio Ave	92	(8)
2005	FC Seoul	11	(1)
2006	Naval	13	(2)
2006–2007	Vitória Guimarães	17	(0)
2007–2008	Penafiel	11	(2)
2008–2009	Moreirense	16	(4)
2009–2010	Vila Meã	22	(3)
Total		390	(26)

Managerial career
- 2012: Leça
- 2013–2014: Salgueiros 08 (assistant)
- 2014–2015: Chaves (assistant)
- 2015–2016: Aves (assistant)
- 2016–2017: Pedras Salgadas
- * Club domestic league appearances and goals

Pedro Filipe Antunes Matias Silva Franco (born 18 April 1974 in Lisbon) is a Portuguese former professional footballer who played as a central defender. He was also a manager.
