= António Jesus =

Portuguese footballer and manager

Personal information
- Full name: António Jesus Pereira
- Date of birth: 11 February 1955
- Place of birth: Espinho, Portugal
- Date of death: 27 September 2010 (aged 55)
- Place of death: Espinho, Portugal
- Height: 1.73 m (5 ft 8 in)
- Position: Goalkeeper

Youth career
- 1970–1971: Espinho
- 1971–1973: Porto

Senior career*
Years	Team	Apps	(Gls)
1973–1974	Chaves		
1974–1976	Lusitânia		
1976–1978	Beira-Mar	14	(0)
1978–1981	Varzim	76	(0)
1981–1988	Vitória Guimarães	139	(0)
1988–1989	Leixões	36	(0)
1989–1990	Chaves	27	(0)
1990–1993	Vitória Guimarães	71	(0)
1993–1994	Chaves	20	(0)
Total		383	(0)

International career
1987	Portugal	7	(0)

Managerial career
- 1989: Leixões
- 1993–1994: Fafe
- 1994: Chaves
- 1994–1995: Marítimo
- 1995–1996: Paços Ferreira
- 1996–2000: Covilhã
- 2000: Operário
- 2000–2001: Chaves
- 2001–2002: Machico
- 2002–2003: Espinho
- 2003–2004: Estarreja
- 2005–2006: Lusitânia
- 2006–2008: Benfica Castelo Branco
- 2008–2010: Tondela
- 2010: Espinho
- * Club domestic league appearances and goals

António Jesus Pereira (11 February 1955 – 27 September 2010), known as Jesus, was a Portuguese football goalkeeper and manager.

== Club career ==
Born in Espinho, Jesus finished his youth career at FC Porto, but never appeared for the team as a senior. After a couple of seasons with S.C. Beira-Mar (his first in the Primeira Liga) he signed for Varzim SC, then Vitória de Guimarães after three more years in the top flight.

With the Minho side, Jesus acted as backup in his first seasons, but was the undisputed starter in his last three, helping Vitória to finish third – 30 matches played and only 22 goals conceded, a competition-best – and reach the quarter-finals in the UEFA Cup in 1986–87, also appearing in the following year's Taça de Portugal final, lost 1–0 to his former club Porto. He left in 1988, spending one top-division campaign apiece with Leixões S.C. and G.D. Chaves, being relegated with the former but finishing fifth with the latter.

The 35-year-old Jesus returned to Vitória in the summer of 1990, taking part in all 38 league games in his debut campaign but subsequently being second-choice. He retired in 1994 at the age of 39 after one year with former side Chaves in the Segunda Liga, having made 363 appearances in Portugal's top tier over 16 seasons.

Already as an active player, Jesus started working as a manager, also being player-coach at Leixões (three matches) and Chaves (11). His subsequent career was almost exclusively spent in divisions two and three, but he led C.S. Marítimo to the seventh position in the top flight in 1994–95; additionally, he spent the 2004–05 season as Guimarães' goalkeeper coach.

== International career ==
After practically all of the Portugal national team defected following the infamous Saltillo Affair at the 1986 FIFA World Cup in Mexico, Jesus was chosen by managers Juca and Ruy Seabra, after their first pick, Zé Beto, as his starter for the UEFA Euro 1988 qualifying campaign. He made his debut on 4 February 1987 at the age of 32, in a 1–0 friendly home win over Belgium. He had 7 caps, all in that year.

== Death ==
On 27 September 2010, around 20:00, Jesus was returning home from a training session with his local club S.C. Espinho. Suddenly, he fell to the ground after suffering a heart attack, being rushed to the hospital but dying shortly after aged 55.
