= Bruno Magalhães (footballer) =

Portuguese footballer (born 1982)

Personal information
- Full name: Bruno António Monteiro Magalhães
- Date of birth: 25 January 1982 (age 44)
- Place of birth: Barcelos, Portugal
- Height: 1.70 m (5 ft 7 in)
- Position: Midfielder

Youth career
- 1992–1995: Gil Vicente
- 1995–1997: Núcleo Andorinhas
- 1997–2001: Braga

Senior career*
Years	Team	Apps	(Gls)
2001–2005	Braga B	119	(2)
2005–2006	Ribeirão	26	(1)
2006–2011	Chaves	120	(3)
2011	Ribeirão	12	(0)
2011–2012	Freamunde	24	(1)
2012–2016	Chaves	77	(0)
2016–2018	Mirandela	65	(1)
Total		443	(8)
- * Club domestic league appearances and goals

Bruno António Monteiro Magalhães (born 25 January 1982 in Barcelos, Braga District) is a Portuguese former professional footballer who played as a midfielder.
