= C.D. Pinhalnovense =

Portuguese association football club

Pinhalnovense
- Full name: Clube Desportivo Pinhalnovense
- Founded: 1948
- Ground: Santos Jorge, Pinhal Novo
- Capacity: 5,000
- Chairman: (Portugal) António Venceslau Sousa
- Manager: (Portugal) João Sousa
- League: AF Setúbal 2ª Divisão
- 2025-26: 2nd of 10 (first phase); 4th of 6 (championship phase)

Clube Desportivo Pinhalnovense is a Portuguese sports club based in the town of Pinhal Novo, Palmela, Setúbal District. Founded in 1948, it currently plays in AF Setúbal 2ª Divisão, holding home games at Campo de Jogos Santos Jorge, with a 5,000-seat capacity.

The club reached the quarter final stage of the 2009–10 Taça de Portugal, where they played at the home stadium of C.D. Cova da Piedade in a 3–1 loss to first league side Naval 1 de Maio. Although the team from the third tier took a 1–0 lead into half time, a strong second-half showing from Naval saw them advance to the semi finals by a score of 3–1. The club subsequently reached the quarter final stage of the following season's cup, where they were drawn against defending champions Porto.

The club's most high-profile player was former Portuguese international Jorge Cadete, who spent the 2004–05 season there before retiring.

== League and cup history ==
Season	I	II	III	IV	V	Pts.	Pl.	W	L	T	GS	GA	Diff.	Portuguese Cup
1999–2000				6 (F)		52 pts	34	13	13	8	55	37	18	
2000–01				3 (F)										
2001–02				1 (F)										
2002–03			14 (S)											
2003–04			2 (S)											
2004–05			3 (S)											
2005–06			6 (S)											1/8 final
2006–07			9 (S/C)											
2007–08			7 (S/C)											1/8 final
2008–09			8 (C)											
2009–10			7 (S)											1/4 final
2010–11			4 (S)											1/4 final
2011–12			5 (S)											
2012–13			10 (S)											
2013–14			7 (S)											
2014–15			6 (G)											
2015–16			6 (H)											
2016–17			5 (H)											
2017–18			5 (E)											
2018–19			12 (D)											
2019–20			6 (D)											
2020–21			6 (H)											
2021–22				10 (F)										

- 2005: 1/8 final (lost 2–1 to CF Belenenses)
- 2007: 1/8 final (lost 6–0 to Sporting Portugal)
- 2010: 1/4 final (lost 3–1 to Naval 1 de Maio)
- 2011: 1/4 final (lost 2–0 to Porto)

== Managers ==
- 2003–2006 : (Spain) Paco Fortes
- 2006–2007 : (Portugal) Rui Nascimento
- 2007–2010 : (Spain) Paco Fortes
- 2010– : (Portugal) Paulo Fonseca

== Current squad ==
As of 17 April 2017

Note: Flags indicate national team as defined under FIFA eligibility rules; some limited exceptions apply. Players may hold more than one non-FIFA nationality.

No.	Pos.	Nation	Player
1	GK	CPV	Romário Andrade
2	DF	CPV	Janício
3	DF	POR	Bruno Miranda
4	DF	POR	Carlos Lomba
5	DF	CHN	Yan Zhang
6	MF	POR	Márcio Delgado
7	FW	POR	Márcio Dieb
8	MF	CPV	José Custódio
9	FW	POR	Rúben Fidalgo
10	MF	POR	Bruno Grou
11	FW	POR	Sébastien Malagueira
12	GK	BRA	Ricardo Andrade
13	FW	CHN	Jiachen Li
14	DF	POR	Rúben Nunes
17	MF	POR	David Silva
20	MF	POR	Dino
20	MF	CHN	Ailong Yang

No.	Pos.	Nation	Player
21	MF	CPV	Laurindo
22	DF	POR	Fábio Oliveira
22	MF	POR	Pedro Mendes
23	MF	CPV	Júnior
24	GK	POR	Jorge Balseiro
24	GK	POR	Iuri Miguel
25	MF	POR	Paulo Regula
30	DF	POR	João Correia
66	FW	CPV	Gilson Varela
70	DF	CHN	Shen Wang
77	FW	POR	Hugo Figueiras
80	MF	CHN	Deng Yubiao
89	FW	BRA	Diego Zaporo
99	DF	POR	Rui Maurício
—	DF	CPV	Vítor Moreno
—	DF	POR	Bruno Bolinhas
—	FW	POR	Tiago Cintra
