= Ohoulo Framelin =

Cameroonian footballer

Personal information
- Full name: Ohoulo Framelin
- Date of birth: 21 November 1996 (age 29)
- Place of birth: Douala, Cameroon
- Height: 1.85 m (6 ft 1 in)
- Position: Goalkeeper

Team information
- Current team: Vitória de Sernache

Youth career
- 2009–2014: EFBC

Senior career*
Years	Team	Apps	(Gls)
2014−2016	Alcanenense	30	(0)
2016−2020	Nacional	3	(0)
2020−	Vitória de Sernache	10	(0)
- * Club domestic league appearances and goals as of 8 August 2021

Ohoulo Framelin (born 21 November 1996) is a Cameroonian footballer who plays for Vitória de Sernache as a goalkeeper.

== Professional career ==
On 30 June 2016, Framelin signed a professional contract with Nacional until 2020. Framelin made his professional debut with Nacional in a 1-0 Taça de Portugal loss to Académica on 19 November 2017.
