= 2012–13 Segunda Divisão =

Segunda Divisão
- Season: 2012–13
- Champions: GD Chaves; 1st D3 title

The 2012–13 Segunda Divisão season was the 79th season since its establishment and the 66th season of recognised third-tier football in Portugal. Varzim were the defending champions. It was the last edition of the competition as Campeonato Nacional de Seniores was created in 2013 to replace the Segunda Divisão B and Terceira Divisão (third and fourth tier of the Portuguese football league system respectively) for the 2013–14 season.

== Zona Norte ==
Pos	Team	Pld	W	D	L	GF	GA	GD	Pts	Qualification or relegation
1	GD Chaves (A)	30	16	10	4	43	21	+22	58	Qualification to championship play-offs
2	GD Ribeirão	30	15	10	5	43	24	+19	55	
3	SC Mirandela	30	15	8	7	41	29	+12	53	
4	FC Vizela	30	14	9	7	41	29	+12	51	
5	AD Os Limianos	30	12	9	9	33	30	+3	45	
6	F.C. Tirsense	30	11	12	7	35	32	+3	45	
7	FC Famalicão	30	11	10	9	42	35	+7	43	
8	Varzim SC	30	8	16	6	31	26	+5	40	
9	AD Fafe	30	10	10	10	37	33	+4	40	
10	Boavista	30	9	11	10	44	40	+4	38	
11	Amarante	30	7	12	11	30	33	−3	33	
12	Gondomar	30	7	12	11	25	27	−2	33	
13	Vilaverdense FC	30	7	12	11	22	36	−14	33	
14	GD Joane	30	7	7	16	27	48	−21	28	
15	FC Infesta (R)	30	7	4	19	30	51	−21	25	Relegation to Distritais
16	Padroense (R)	30	5	6	19	23	53	−30	21	Relegation to Distritais

Source: nifs.no and zerozero.pt
Rules for classification: 1) points; 2) goal difference; 3) number of goals scored.
(A) Advance to a further round; (R) Relegated

== Zona Centro ==
Pos	Team	Pld	W	D	L	GF	GA	GD	Pts	Qualification or relegation
1	Académico Viseu (A)	30	16	10	4	47	21	+26	58	Qualification to championship play-offs
2	Cinfães	30	14	11	5	50	31	+19	53	
3	Operário	30	13	9	8	44	33	+11	48	
4	Espinho	30	13	9	8	36	32	+4	48	
5	Benfica Castelo Branco	30	12	10	8	44	33	+11	46	
6	Pampilhosa	30	13	7	10	42	38	+4	46	
7	UD Sousense	30	10	11	9	37	34	+3	41	
8	Anadia	30	12	4	14	31	38	−7	40	
9	S. João de Ver	30	11	7	12	35	39	−4	40	
10	Coimbrões	30	8	13	9	35	41	−6	37	
11	AD Nogueirense	30	9	9	12	34	39	−5	36	
12	GD Tourizense	30	8	11	11	27	31	−4	35	
13	FC Cesarense	30	8	10	12	28	35	−7	34	
14	SC Bustelo	30	6	13	11	32	41	−9	31	
15	Lusitânia F.C. (R)	30	6	11	13	38	50	−12	29	Relegation to Distritais
16	UD Tocha (R)	30	3	11	16	24	48	−24	20	Relegation to Distritais

Source: nifs.no and zerozero.pt
Rules for classification: 1) points; 2) goal difference; 3) number of goals scored.
(A) Advance to a further round; (R) Relegated

== Zona Sul ==
Pos	Team	Pld	W	D	L	GF	GA	GD	Pts	Qualification or relegation
1	S.C. Farense (A)	30	19	8	3	38	21	+17	65	Qualification to championship play-offs
2	CD Mafra	30	19	7	4	57	28	+29	64	
3	SCU Torreense	30	15	7	8	39	31	+8	52	
4	Sertanense FC	30	15	6	9	44	31	+13	51	
5	Oriental Lisboa	30	15	4	11	55	34	+21	49	
6	SU 1º Dezembro	30	12	11	7	29	25	+4	47	
7	U.D. Leiria	30	13	7	10	36	31	+5	46	
8	C.D. Fátima	30	13	4	13	36	31	+5	43	
9	Casa Pia A.C.	30	9	13	8	30	24	+6	40	
10	CD Pinhalnovense	30	10	8	12	34	38	−4	38	
11	Louletano DC	30	9	8	13	25	35	−10	35	
12	CDR Quarteirense	30	7	13	10	26	34	−8	34	
13	C.F. Benfica	30	8	7	15	36	55	−19	31	
14	AD Carregado	30	5	9	16	34	51	−17	24	
15	AD Oeiras (R)	30	4	9	17	24	45	−21	21	Relegation to Distritais
16	C.D. Ribeira Brava (R)	30	4	5	21	27	56	−29	17	Relegation to Distritais

Source: nifs.no and zerozero.pt
Rules for classification: 1) points; 2) goal difference; 3) number of goals scored.
(A) Advance to a further round; (R) Relegated

== Play-offs ==
Pos	Team	Pld	W	D	L	GF	GA	GD	Pts	Promotion
1	GD Chaves (C, P)	2	1	1	0	3	2	+1	4	Promotion to Segunda Liga
2	S.C. Farense (P)	2	0	2	0	3	3	0	2	Promotion to Segunda Liga
3	Académico Viseu	2	0	1	1	1	2	−1	1	

Source: zerozero.pt
Rules for classification: 1) points; 2) goal difference; 3) number of goals scored.
(C) Champions; (P) Promoted

=== Top goalscorers ===
Rank	Player	Club	Goals
1	(Portugal) Marco Almeida	Académico de Viseu	1
1	(Portugal) Mário Mendonça	Chaves	1
1	(Portugal) Tijane	Chaves	1
1	(Spain) Éder Díez	Chaves	1
1	(Portugal) André Matias	Farense	1
1	(Brazil) Rafael Silveira	Farense	1
1	(Senegal) Mbaye Diop	Farense	1
