= CD Operário =

Portuguese association football club

Operário dos Açores
- Full name: Clube Operário Desportivo
- Founded: 1948
- Ground: Estádio João Gualberto Borges Arruda; Lagoa, Azores; Portugal
- Capacity: 2,500
- Chairman: Gilberto Branquinho
- Head Coach: Emanuel Simão
- League: Campeonato de Portugal
- 2023–24: Liga Meo Azores, 1st (Promoted)
Home colours

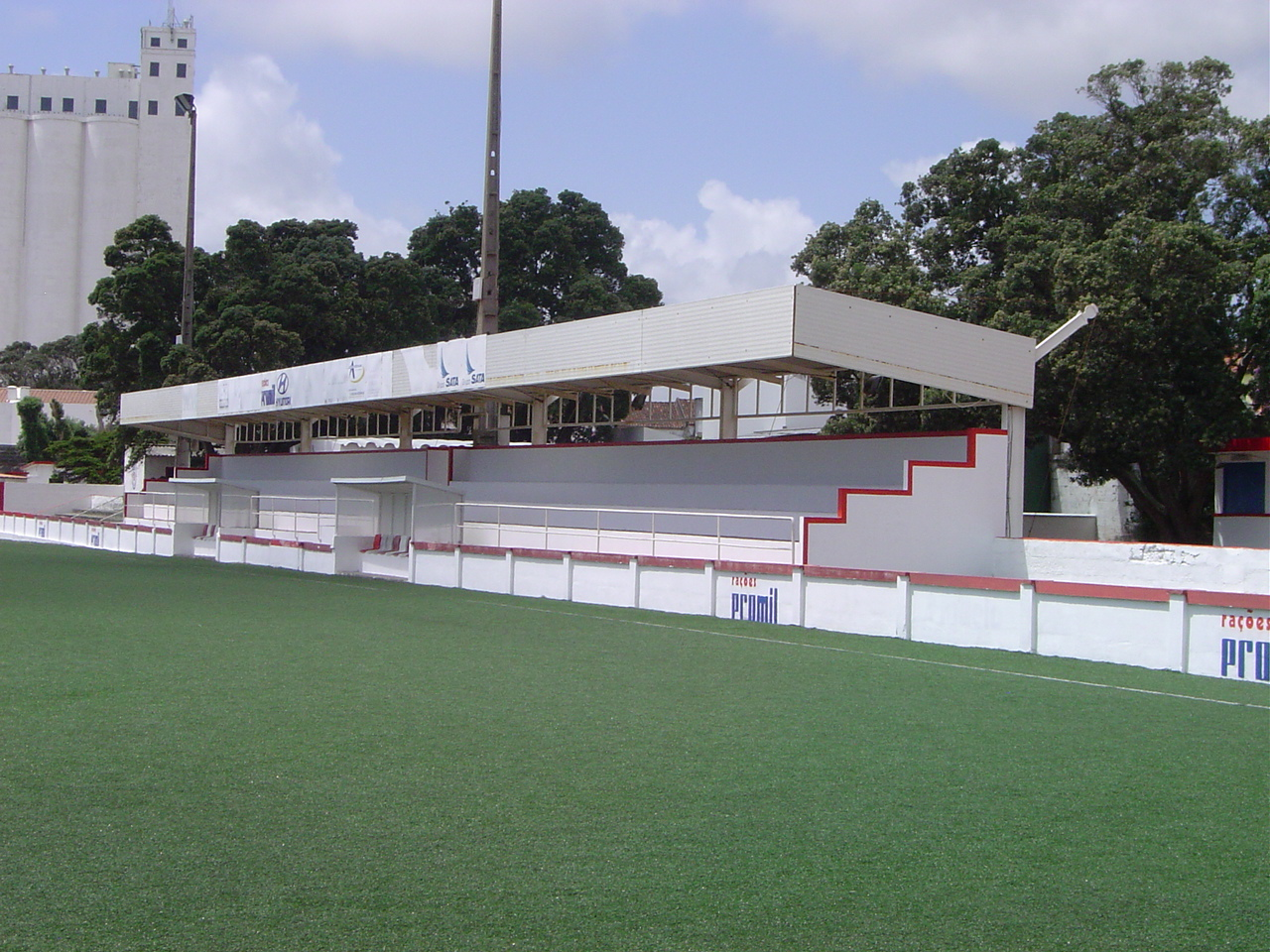
CD Operário Main Stand

Clube Operário Desportivo (known as CD Operário, Operário dos Açores or just Operário), is a Portuguese football club based in Lagoa in the island of São Miguel in the Azores.

== Background ==
CD Operário currently plays in the Campeonato de Portugal which is the fourth tier of Portuguese football. The club was founded in 1948 and they play their home matches at the seaside stadium of João Gualberto Borges Arruda in Lagoa. The stadium is able to accommodate 2,500 spectators. The club colours are red, white and blue.

The club is affiliated to Associação de Futebol de Ponta Delgada and has competed in the AF Ponta Delgada Taça. The club has also entered the national cup competition known as Taça de Portugal on many occasions.

== History ==
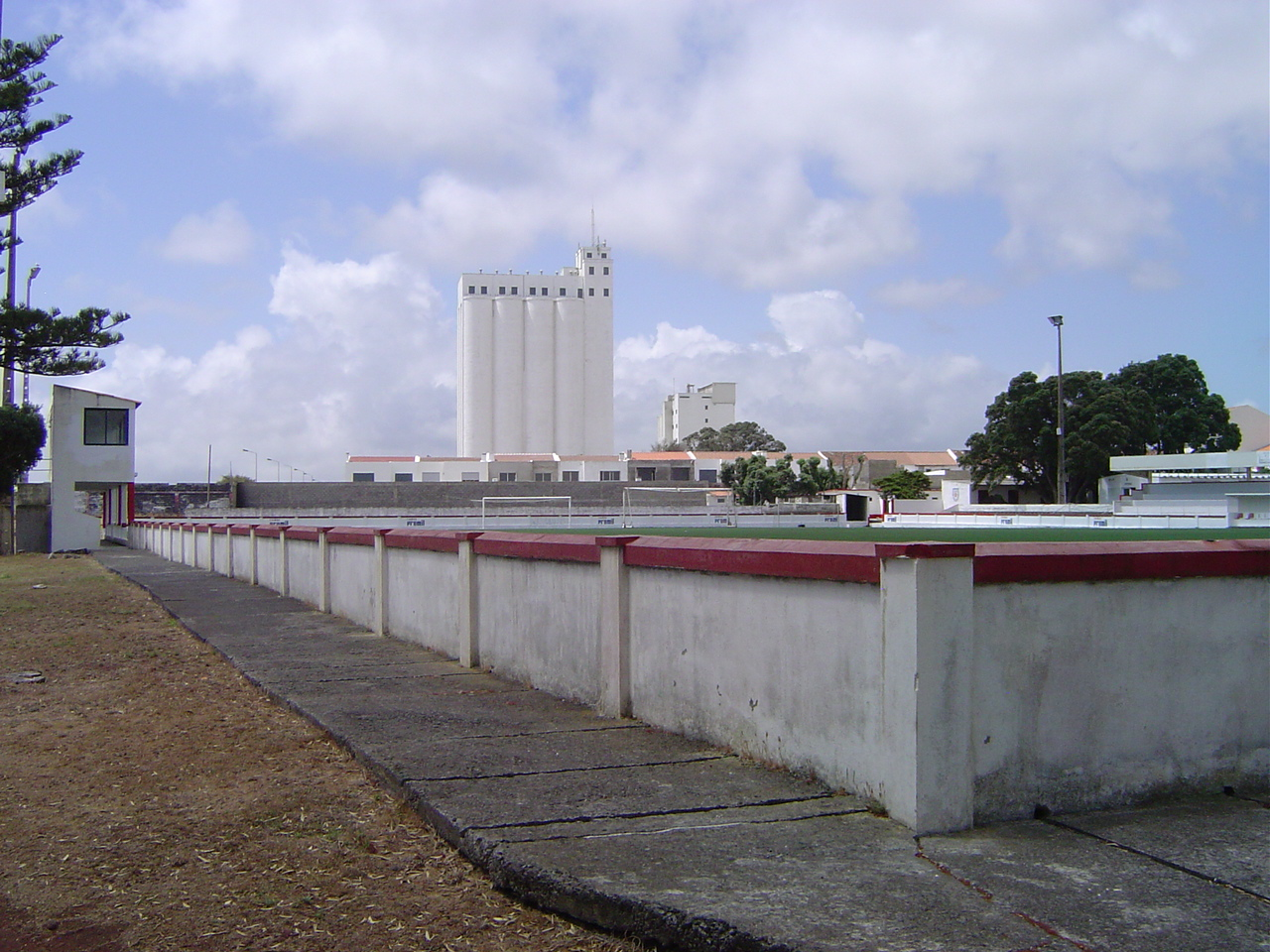
CD Operário can trace their roots to the adjacent Factory complex.

Clube Operário Desportivo was founded on 2 January 1948 by João do Rego Lopes, the Factory Foreman at Álcool da Lagoa. The Board of the Factory agreed to authorise a Works senior football team. It was at first known as “Fábrica do Álcool” before later becoming “Operário” and for many years was known as “Pica-Ferrugem”.

The closure of two existing clubs in Lagoa, “Os Leões” and “Os Vermelhos”, resulted in an influx of new players to Operário including Fernando Reis (goalkeeper) Jacinto Machado, Nazaré, Raul Brum and António Amaral. The club began to grow and moved out of the Factory to a small house in Rua da Fábrica which was later acquired by the club and is still deployed by the club as their headquarters.

In 1994 the club's executive committee, under chairman José Eduardo Martins Mota, undertook a major project to provide new stadium facilities. The project was initiated in 1995 and was completed in 2005. It was undertaken in two phases and has endowed the club with a lasting legacy of excellent facilities.

In terms of success on the pitch the club won their first official competition in the 1968/69 season by winning the AF Ponta Delgada 1ª Divisão championship and the AF Ponta Delgada Taça (District Cup). The following season Operário were the champions of the Azores. The club made significant progress in 1990/91 by again winning the AF Ponta Delgada 1ª Divisão championship and the Azores championship. This time they gained promotion to the Terceira Divisão, national Third Division and in their first season in 1991/92 they competed against mainland teams in Série E, finishing in tenth place. They remained at this level until 1997/98 when they won Série Açores and gained promotion to Segunda Divisão, the national Second Division (third tier). Over the last 14 seasons they have spent all but one in the Segunda Divisão. Their best season was in 2007/08 when they finished second in Série D.

The club recognises the hard work of their coaches in the early years including Gualberto and Prof. Jorge Amaral. In later years Operário's coaches have included Armando Fontes, Vítor Simas, Mariano Raposo, António Barata, Jaime Graça, José Luís, António Jesus Pereira, Filipe Moreira, Jorge Portela and Agathon Francisco. Finally the club acknowledges the contribution that key players have made to the history and advancement of the club, including the efforts of Jacinto Machado, Nazaré, Raul de Brum, João Moleiro, Guilherme Fragoso, Eduíno (goalkeeper), Adriano Russo, António Amaral, José Machado, Eleutério, Isaías Medeiros Ponte (goalkeeper), Diogo, Luís Tavares, Adriano Teodoro, João Correia, Viola, Norberto Machado, Eugénio, Capacheira, Laranja, Brinco, Ganeira, Mariano, Tavares, Jorge and Pauleta.

== Season to season ==
Season	Level	Division	Section	Place	Movements	Taça de Portugal
1990–91	Tier 5	Distritais	AF Ponta Delgada - 1ª Divisão		Promoted	
1991–92	Tier 4	Terceira Divisão	Série E	10th		Second Round
1992–93	Tier 4	Terceira Divisão	Série E	3rd		Second Round
1993–94	Tier 4	Terceira Divisão	Série E	7th		Fifth Round
1994–95	Tier 4	Terceira Divisão	Série E	10th		Third Round
1995–96	Tier 4	Terceira Divisão	Série Açores	3rd		Second Round
1996–97	Tier 4	Terceira Divisão	Série Açores	6th		Second Round
1997–98	Tier 4	Terceira Divisão	Série Açores	1st	Promoted	Third Round
1998–99	Tier 3	Segunda Divisão	Série Sul	12th		Second Round
1999–2000	Tier 3	Segunda Divisão	Série Sul	11th		Second Round
2000–01	Tier 3	Segunda Divisão	Série Sul	8th		Third Round
2001–02	Tier 3	Segunda Divisão	Série Sul	14th		Fourth Round
2002–03	Tier 3	Segunda Divisão	Série Sul	17th	Relegated	Second Round
2003–04	Tier 4	Terceira Divisão	Série Açores	1st	Promoted	Second Round
2004–05	Tier 3	Segunda Divisão	Série Sul	6th		Second Round
2005–06	Tier 3	Segunda Divisão	Série D	4th		Third Round
2006–07	Tier 3	Segunda Divisão	Serie D	2nd		Third Round
2007–08	Tier 3	Segunda Divisão	Série D - 1ª Fase	2nd	Promotion Group	Fourth Round
2007–08	Tier 3	Segunda Divisão	Série D Fase Final	2nd		Fourth Round
2008–09	Tier 3	Segunda Divisão	Série C - 1ª Fase	5th	Promotion Group	Third Round
2008–09	Tier 3	Segunda Divisão	Série C Fase Final	5th		Third Round
2009–10	Tier 3	Segunda Divisão	Série Centro	11th		Third Round
2010–11	Tier 3	Segunda Divisão	Série Sul	9th		Third Round
2011–12	Tier 3	Segunda Divisão	Série Centro	3rd		Second Round
2012–13	Tier 3	Segunda Divisão	Série Centro	3rd		Second Round (Note: Operário won their second round match 3–1 but were eventually excluded from the competition because they fielded irregularly their goalkeeper.)
2013–14	Tier 3	Campeonato Nacional de Seniores	Série G	3rd	Relegation Group	Third Round
2014–15	Tier 3	Campeonato Nacional de Seniores	Série H	1st	Promotion Group	Fourth Round
2015–16	Tier 3	Campeonato de Portugal	Série E	3rd	Relegation Group	Fourth Round
2016–17	Tier 3	Campeonato de Portugal	Série E	2nd	Promotion Group	First Round
2017–18	Tier 3	Campeonato de Portugal	Série E	12th	Relegated	Third Round
2018–19	Tier 4	District Championships	Liga Meo Azores	5th		DNQ
2019–20	Tier 4	District Championships	Liga Meo Azores	3rd		DNQ
2020–21	Tier 4	District Championships	Liga Meo Azores	1st	Promoted	DNQ
2021–22	Tier 4	Campeonato de Portugal	Série E	6th	Relegated	DNE
2022–23	Tier 5	District Championships	Liga Meo Azores	2nd		DNQ
2023–24	Tier 5	District Championships	Liga Meo Azores	1st	Promoted	First Round
2024–25	Tier 4	Campeonato de Portugal	Série D			Second Round

== Honours ==
- Terceira Divisão
  - Champions (2): 1997–98, 2003–04 (Série Açores)

== Current squad ==
As of 24 December 2021

Note: Flags indicate national team as defined under FIFA eligibility rules; some limited exceptions apply. Players may hold more than one non-FIFA nationality.

No.	Pos.	Nation	Player
1	GK	POR	Flávio Brandão
2	DF	POR	Ricardo Carvalho
4	DF	POR	Pedro Tavares
5	MF	POR	Gonçalo Pereira
6	DF	BRA	Igor Cartaxo
7	MF	POR	Raúl Cardoso
8	DF	POR	Gonçalo Reyes
9	FW	BRA	Neto
10	MF	POR	Dani Sousa

No.	Pos.	Nation	Player
11	DF	BRA	Jullyan Duarte
14	FW	BRA	Paulo Bessa
15	DF	POR	Chileno
18	MF	BRA	Marcão
19	FW	CPV	Joazimar Stehb
20	FW	POR	Diogo Medeiros
22	DF	POR	Edgar Teixeira
25	DF	POR	Samuel Velho
29	GK	POR	João Cunha

== Gallery ==
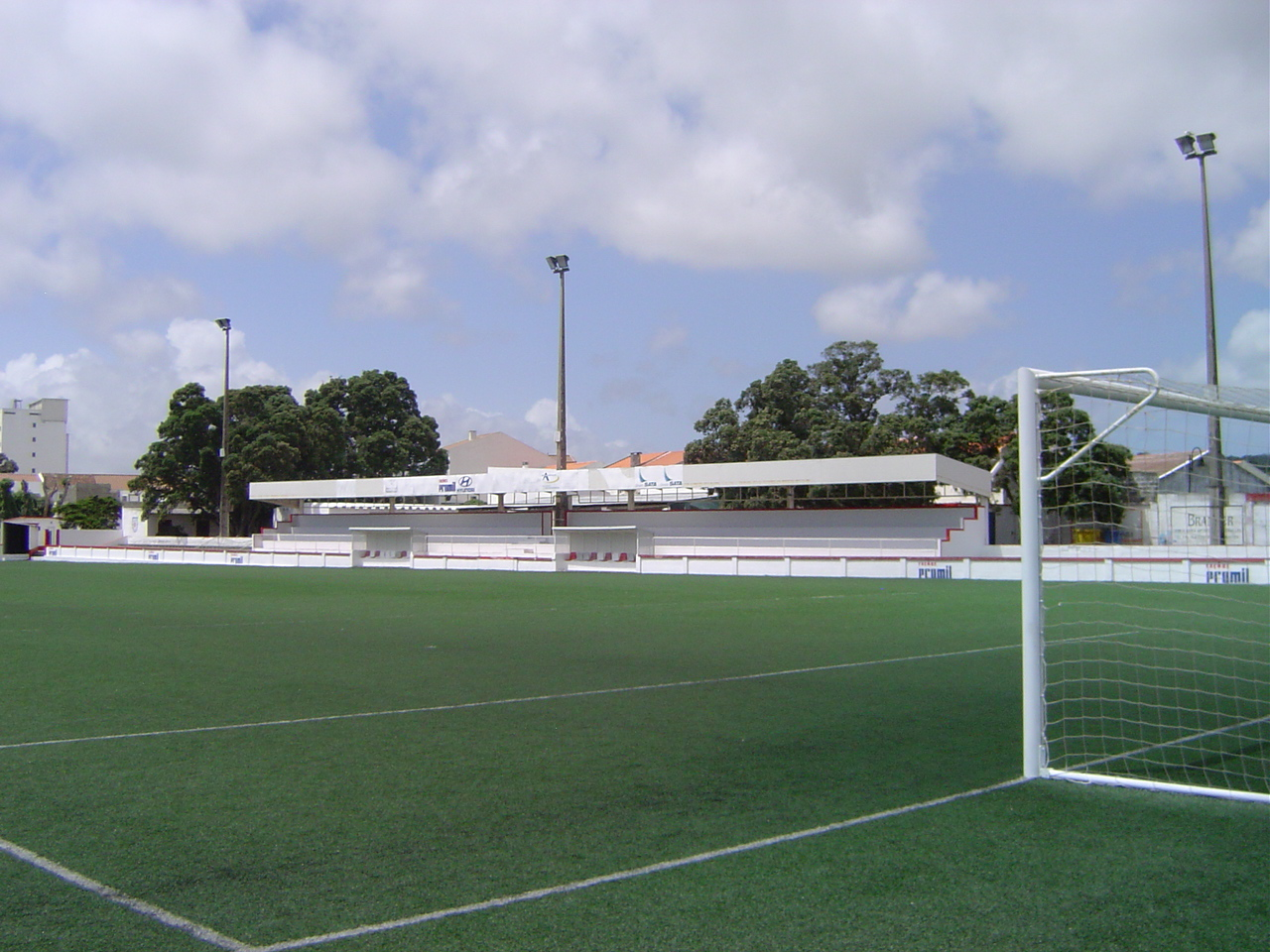
Main stand and setting

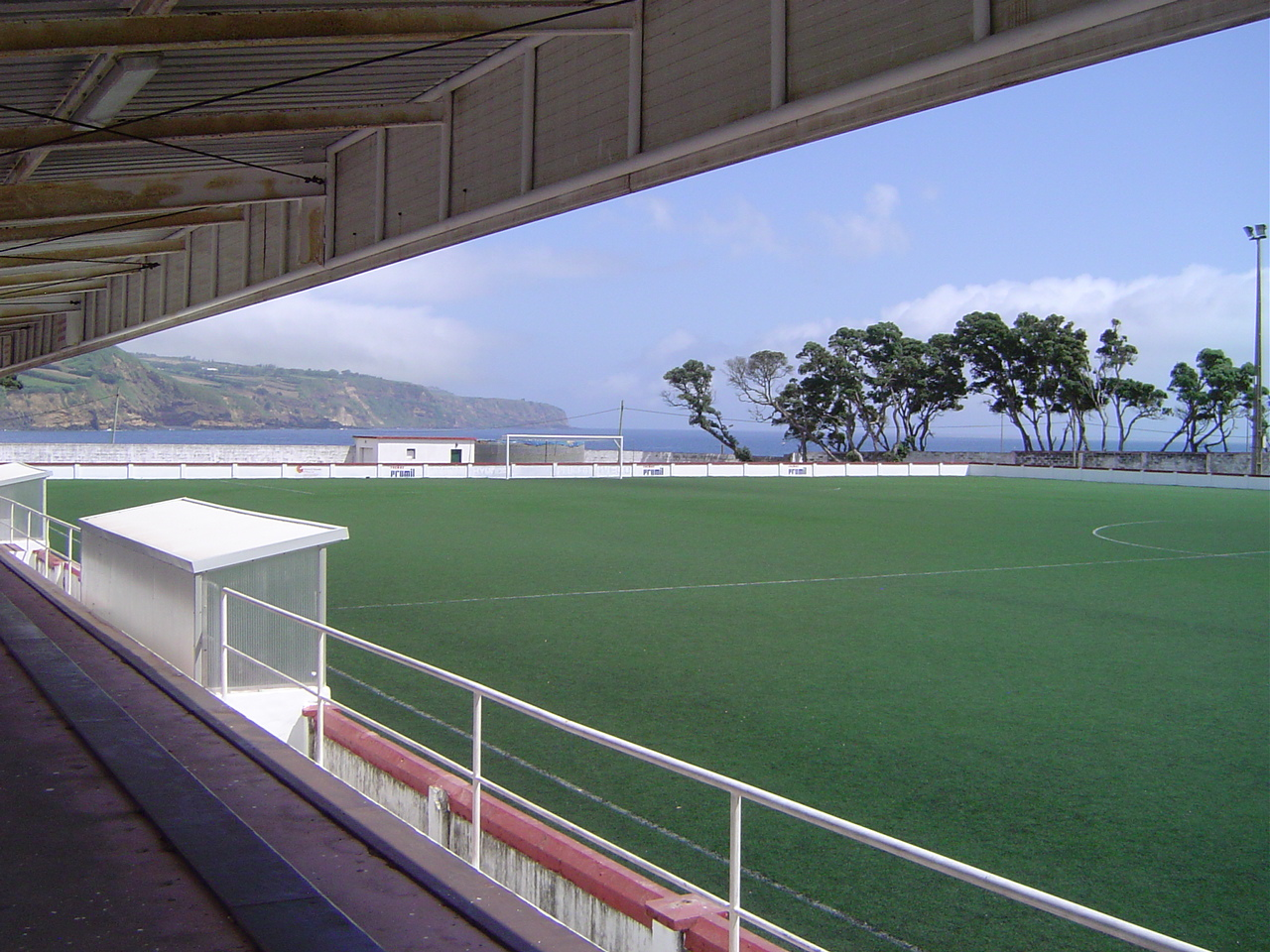
Sea view from the main stand

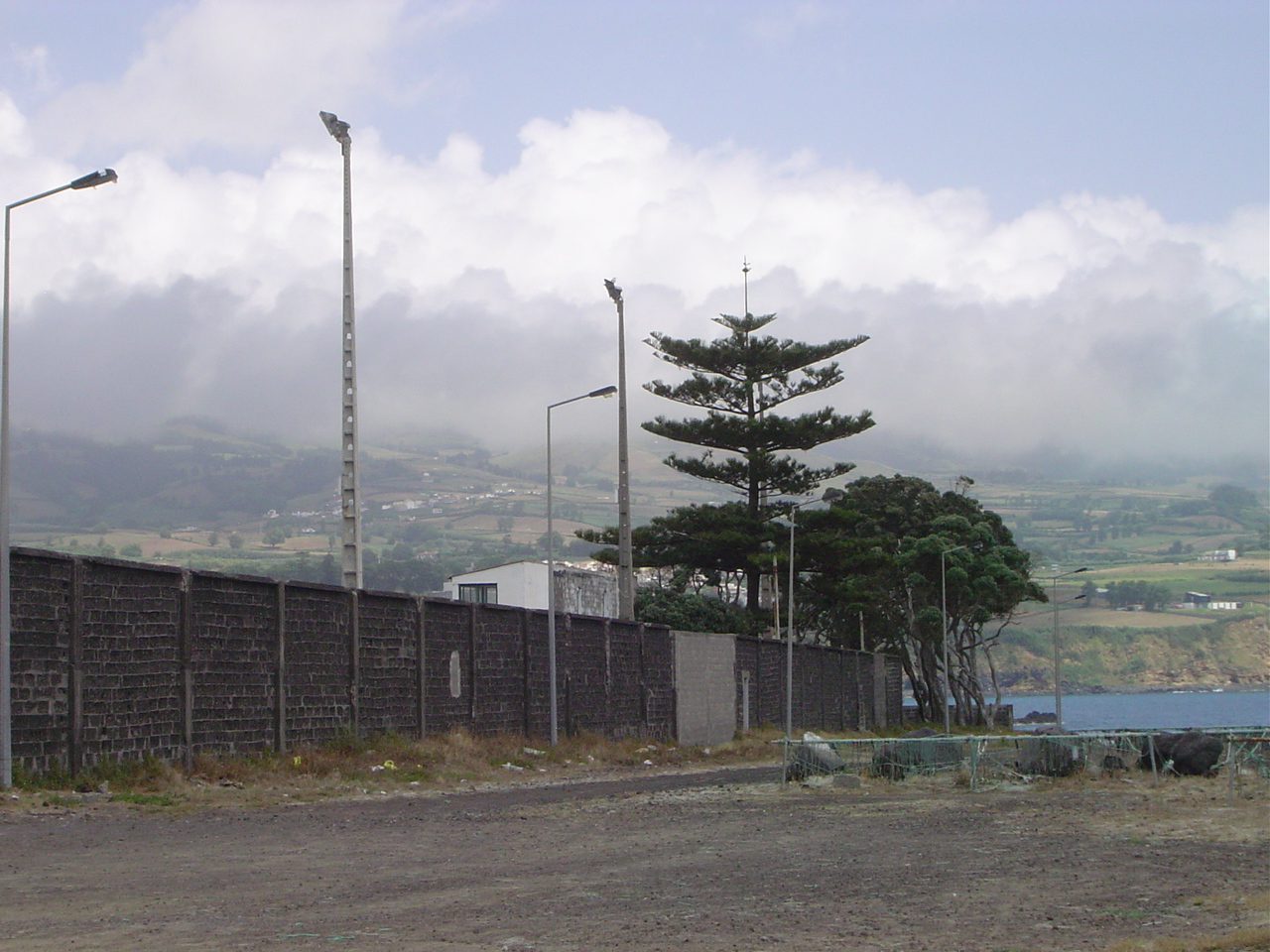
Seafront location of the club

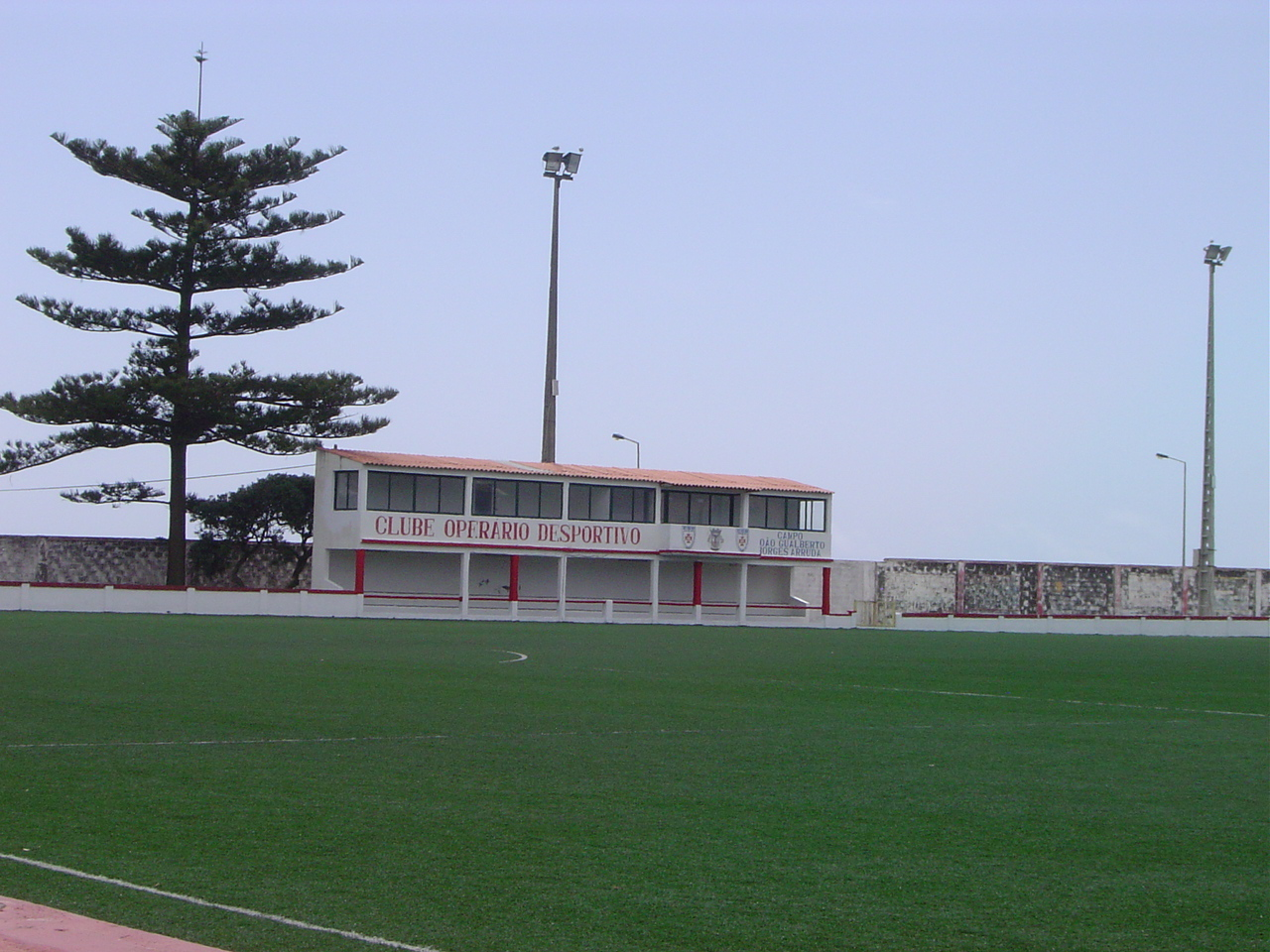
Administration complex

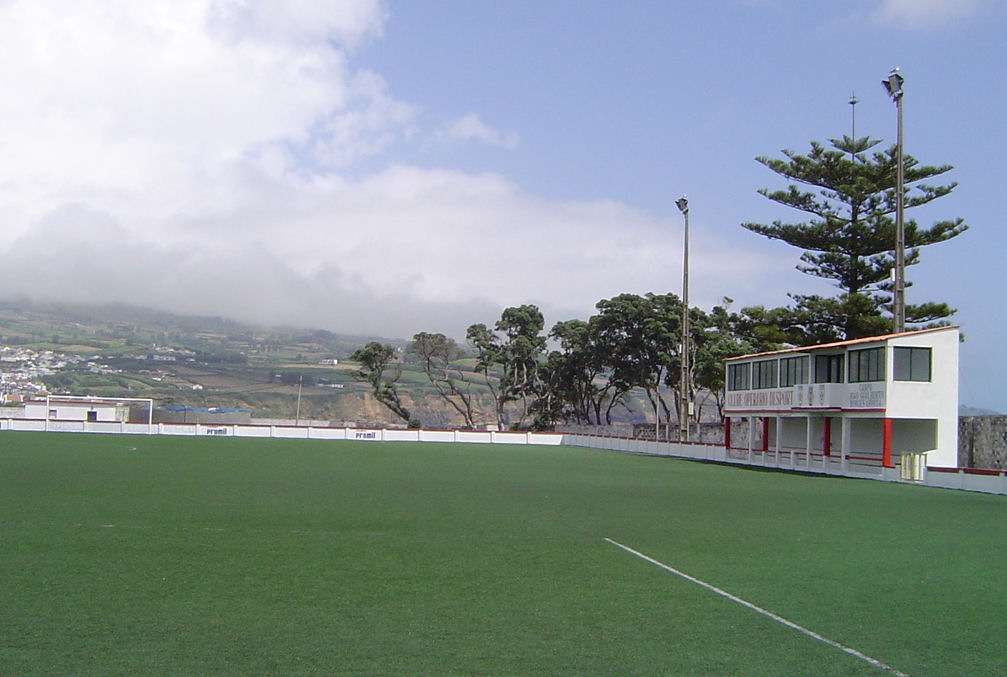
Administration complex and setting

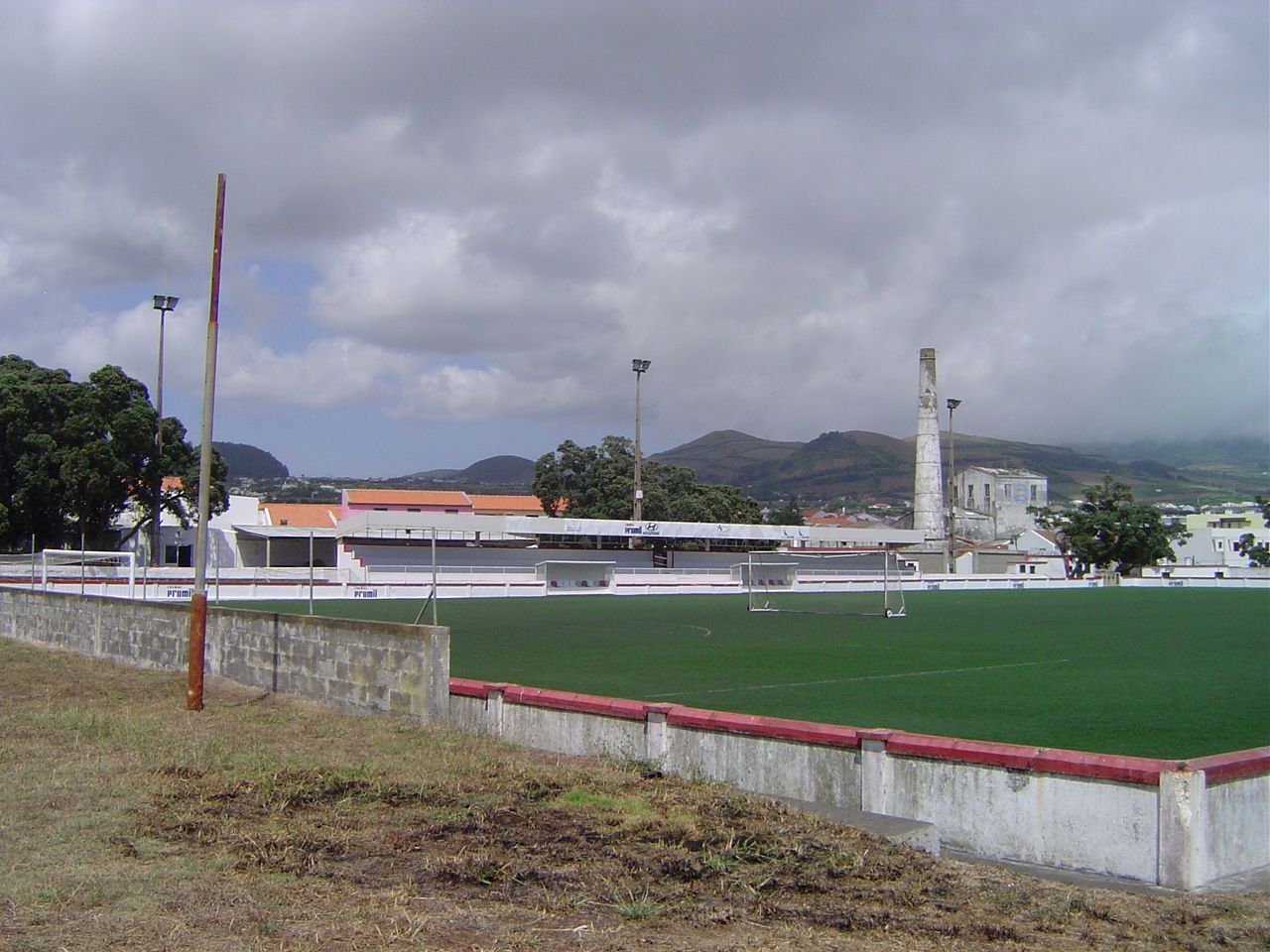
Ground setting

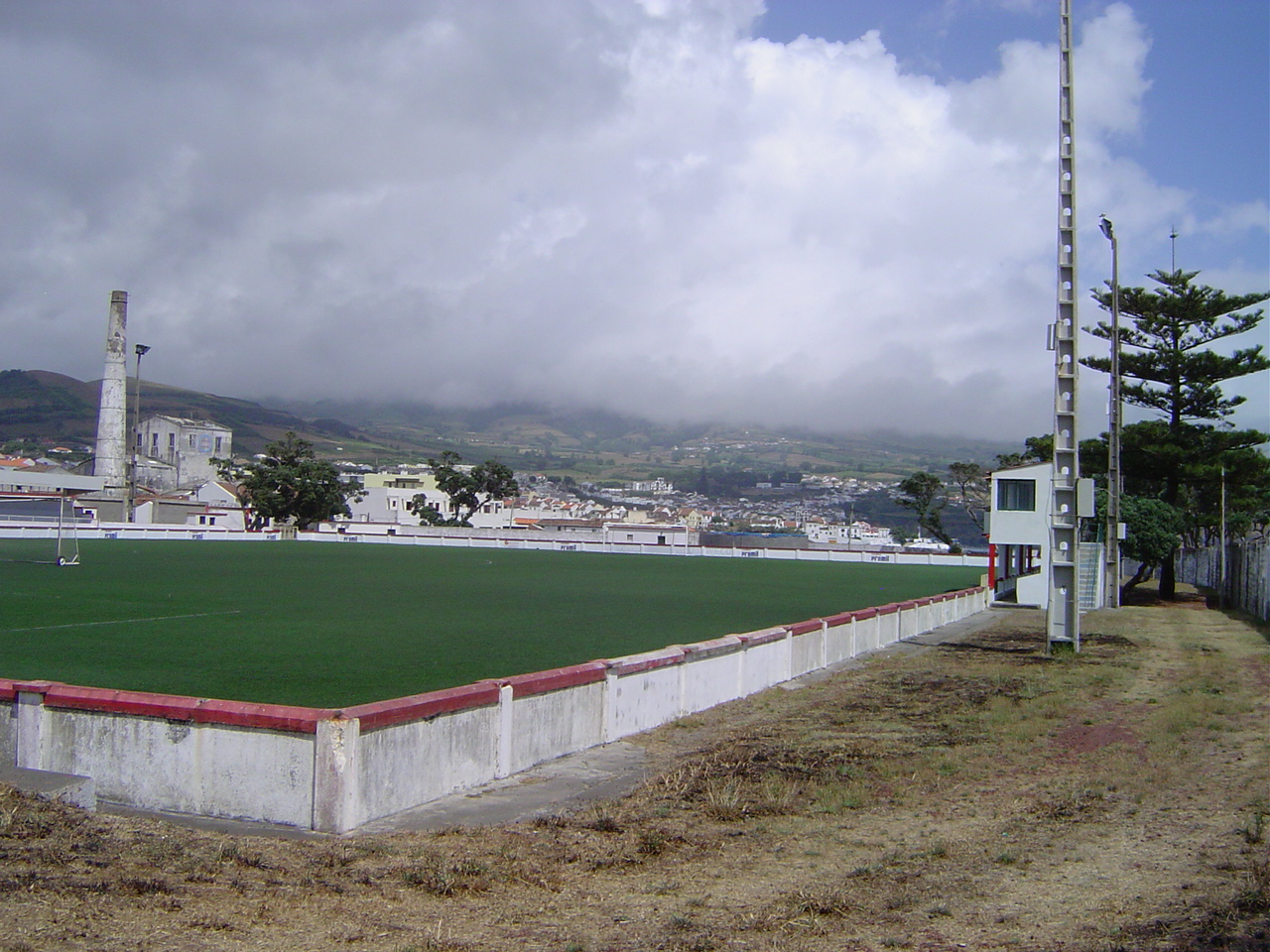
Ground setting

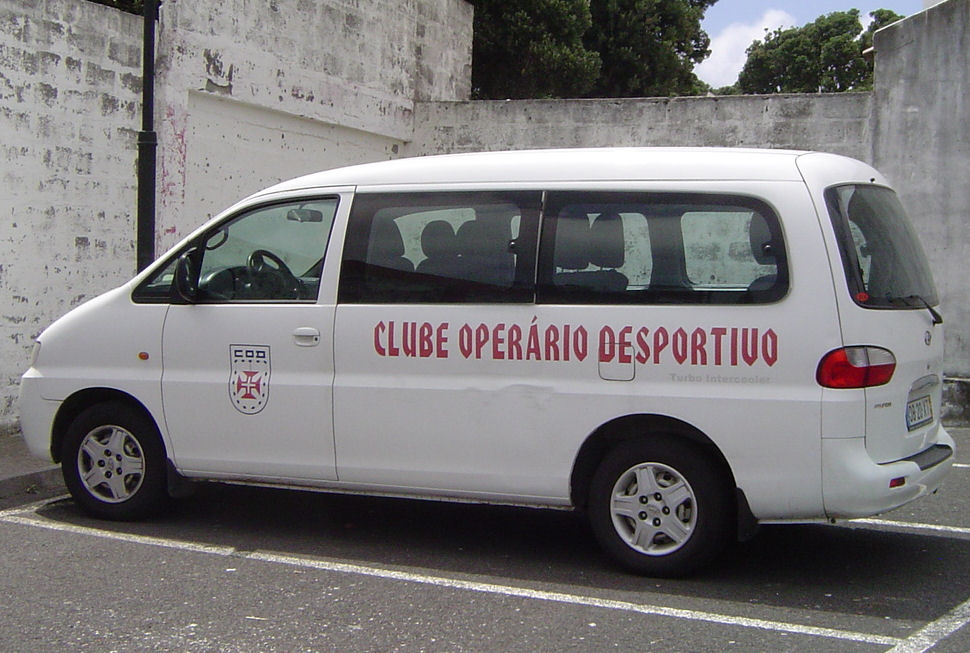
Club minibus

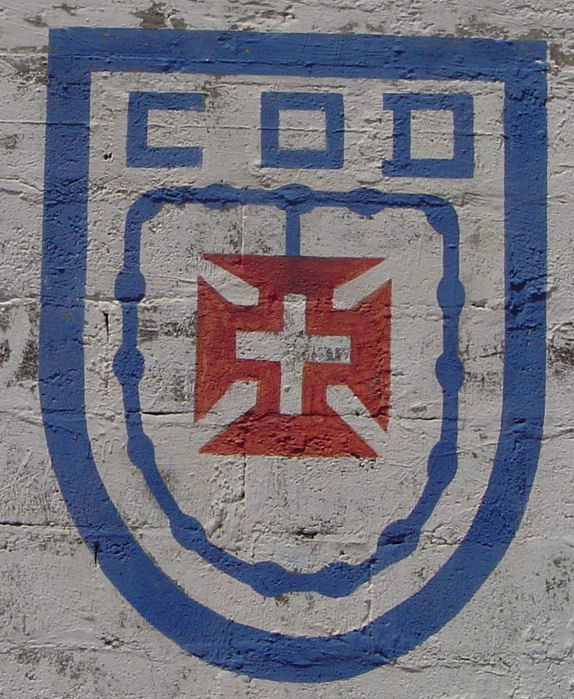
Club badge

== Notable players ==
- (Angola) Rui Paulo Silva Júnior
- (Brazil) Rodrigo De Lazzari
- (Brazil) Júlio César do Nascimento
- (Brazil) Cílio André Souza
- (Cameroon) Clément Beaud
- (Cape Verde) Graciano Brito
- (Portugal) Rui Miguel Rodrigues Pereira Andrade
- (Portugal) João Botelho
- (Portugal) Hélder Godinho
- (Portugal) Miguel Lopes
- (Portugal) Alberto Louzeiro
- (Portugal) Pauleta
- (Portugal) Pedro Pacheco
- (Portugal) Tiago Pires
- (Portugal) Rúben Filipe Costa Rodrigues
- (Portugal) Nuno Santos
- (Portugal) Hugo Simões
- (Portugal) Vado

== Notable managers ==
- (Portugal) António Jesus Pereira
