= Rudy Monteiro =

Cape Verdean footballer

Personal information
- Full name: Rudy Ravy de Pina Monteiro
- Date of birth: 22 May 1996 (age 30)
- Place of birth: São Filipe, Cape Verde
- Height: 1.80 m (5 ft 11 in)
- Position: Forward

Team information
- Current team: União da Madeira

Senior career*
Years	Team	Apps	(Gls)
2014–2015	Spartak d'Aguadinha		
2015–2019	Marítimo B	48	(4)
2016	Marítimo C	11	(6)
2018–2019	Marítimo	0	(0)
2019–	União da Madeira	4	(1)
- * Club domestic league appearances and goals as of 5 October 2019

Rudy Ravy de Pina Monteiro (born 22 May 1996) is a Cape Verdean footballer who plays in Portugal for União da Madeira as a forward.

== Football career ==
On 28 December 2018, Monteiro made his professional debut with Marítimo in a 2018–19 Taça da Liga match against Estoril Praia.
