= Vitinha (footballer, born 1991) =

Portuguese footballer

Personal information
- Full name: Vítor Reis Alves
- Date of birth: 7 March 1991 (age 35)
- Place of birth: Ponta Delgada, Portugal
- Height: 1.79 m (5 ft 10 1/2 in)
- Position: Midfielder

Team information
- Current team: Praiense
- Number: 20

Youth career
- 2000–2002: Capelense
- 2002–2006: Santa Clara
- 2006–2007: Porto
- 2007–2010: Santa Clara

Senior career*
Years	Team	Apps	(Gls)
2010–2011	Capelense	13	(3)
2011–2012	Ideal	27	(5)
2012–2014	Praiense	51	(5)
2014–2016	Santa Clara	5	(0)
2015–2016	→ Praiense (loan)	32	(4)
2016–	Praiense	92	(4)
- * Club domestic league appearances and goals as of 22:45, 21 October 2019 (UTC)

Vítor Reis Alves (born 7 March 1991), known as Vitinha, is a Portuguese professional footballer who plays for S.C. Praiense as a midfielder.
