= Rodrigo De Lazzari =

Brazilian footballer

Personal information
- Full name: Rodrigo De Lazzari
- Date of birth: 10 December 1980 (age 45)
- Place of birth: Curitiba, Brazil
- Height: 1.89 m (6 ft 2 in)
- Position: Defender

Team information
- Current team: Noroeste

Youth career
- 1996–1997: Coritiba

Senior career*
Years	Team	Apps	(Gls)
1998–2001	Malucelli		
2002	Batel de Guarapuava		
2002	Associação Atlética Batel		
2003	Operário dos Açores		
2004	Fanáticos		
2005	Malucelli		
2005	Operário Ferrovário		
2006	Marcílio Dias		
2007	Paranavaí	0	(0)
2007–2008	Siena	1	(0)
2008	→ Martina (loan)	7	(0)
2009	Colligiana	0	(0)
2010	Itumbiara	0	(0)
2010	Operário Ferrovário	11	(0)
2011	Chapecoense	2	(0)
2012–	Noroeste		
- * Club domestic league appearances and goals

Rodrigo De Lazzari (born 10 December 1980) is a Brazilian footballer who plays for Noroeste.

== Biography ==
In January 2003, he was signed by C.D. Operário from Associação Atlética Batel.

On 31 August 2007, he was signed by A.C. Siena along with Vanderson Scardovelli. They left for Martina on loan on 31 January 2008.

In February 2009 he joined Colligiana

After being without a club in June 2009, he joined Itumbiara in December. In July 2010, he was re-signed by Operário Ferrovário.

In December 2010, he left for Chapecoense.

== Honours ==
- Campeonato Paranaense: 2007
