= Mbaye Diop =

Senegalese footballer

Personal information
- Date of birth: July 24, 1984 (age 42)
- Place of birth: Dakar, Senegal
- Height: 1.86 m (6 ft 1 in)
- Position: Striker

Senior career*
Years	Team	Apps	(Gls)
2004–2005	Dragões Sandinenses	2	(4)
2005–2008	Camacha	69	(30)
2008–2009	Slavia Sofia	10	(0)
2009–2010	Chaves	24	(2)
2010	Interclube		
2011–2012	União Madeira	32	(4)
2012–2014	Farense	31	(10)
2014–2015	Quarteirense	11	(4)
2015–2017	Camacha	47	(16)
- * Club domestic league appearances and goals

Mbaye Diop (born July 24, 1984) is a Senegalese retired footballer.
