= S.C. Valenciano =

Portuguese sports club

- Full name: Sport Clube Valenciano
- Founded: 1924
- Ground: Estádio Dr. Lourenço Raimundo, Valença do Minho
- Capacity: 500
- League: Ap. Campeão da AF Viana
- 2020–21: 3rd

Sport Clube Valenciano is a Portuguese sports club from Valença do Minho.

The men's football team plays in the Ap. Campeão da AF Viana. The team played on the third-tier 1997–98 Segunda Divisão B and 2004–05 Segunda Divisão B, being relegated both times. The team was later relegated further from the 2010–11 Terceira Divisão. Another one-off season on the new third tier 2013–14 Campeonato Nacional de Seniores followed.

In the Taça de Portugal, Valenciano notably reached the third round in 2018–19.
