= S.C. Praiense =

Portuguese association football club

- Full name: Sport Clube Praiense
- Founded: 1947
- Ground: Estádio Municipal da Praia da Vitória, Praia da Vitória, Azores
- Capacity: 1,500
- Chairman: Marco Monteiro
- Manager: Luís Manuel
- League: Campeonato de Portugal
- 2022–23: Serie D, 10th
- Website: http://scpraiense.pt.vu/

Sport Clube Praiense commonly known as simply as Praiense is a Portuguese sports club from the region of Praia da Vitória, Azores. Founded in 1947, the club currently plays at the Estádio Municipal da Praia da Vitória which holds a seating capacity of 1500. In its entire history, Praiense has only ever won one major trophy which was in the 2007–08 season where they won the Terceira Divisão.

== Current squad ==
Note: Flags indicate national team as defined under FIFA eligibility rules; some limited exceptions apply. Players may hold more than one non-FIFA nationality.

No.	Pos.	Nation	Player
1	GK	(Portugal) POR	Tiago Maia
2	DF	(Brazil) BRA	Alexsandro Ribeiro
3	DF	(Portugal) POR	Breno Freitas
4	DF	(Portugal) POR	Diogo Careca
5	MF	(Portugal) POR	Marcos Silva
6	MF	(Portugal) POR	Dário Paiva
7	FW	(Brazil) BRA	Ragner Paula
8	MF	(Portugal) POR	Diogo Moniz
9	FW	(Portugal) POR	Cristiano Magina
10	MF	(Portugal) POR	Márcio Augusto
11	FW	(Portugal) POR	Filipe Andrade
13	DF	(Portugal) POR	Bruno Sousa

No.	Pos.	Nation	Player
14	FW	(Portugal) POR	João Pedro
16	FW	(Uruguay) URU	Tiago Nannini
20	MF	(Portugal) POR	Vitinha
22	DF	(Brazil) BRA	Weliton Matos
24	GK	(Portugal) POR	Fábio Pimentel
28	DF	(Brazil) BRA	Itto Cruz
33	FW	(Brazil) BRA	Matheus Souza
70	MF	(Portugal) POR	João Peixoto
93	MF	(Portugal) POR	Paulo Teles
99	GK	(Portugal) POR	Rafa Pires
—	MF	(Portugal) POR	Ricardinho
