= Odivelas F.C. =

Portuguese sports club

Odivelas
- Full name: Odivelas Futebol Clube
- Founded: 1939
- Ground: Estádio Arnaldo Dias, Odivelas
- Capacity: 3,000
- Chairman: (Portugal) Luis Guilherme Baptista
- Manager: (Portugal) Andrade
- League: Portuguese Regional Leagues
- 2011–12: 8

Odivelas Futebol Clube is a sporting association in the city of Odivelas, in Greater Lisbon. It was founded in 1939 and has three football fields a gymnasium and other facilities. Odivelas F.C has won the Third Division in 1993. At youth level Odivelas is one of the best academies in the country with players like Sílvio Manuel Pereira and Roderick Miranda coming out of their ranks.

== Recent Years ==
Odivelas F.C. is currently in a massive financial crisis with lack of funds to support the team. This resulted in a couple of bad seasons that saw Odivelas slip from Second Division to the Regional Leagues. Last season, Odivelas was out of the National League system for the first time in many years achieving a modest 8th place in Lisbon Regional League. But the worst problem last season was play home-matches away from Estádio Arnaldo Dias. Odivelas F.C. had to play their matches on a loaned-field in neighbouring city Lisbon, which drove away the fans from the team.

== Squad ==
Note: Flags indicate national team as defined under FIFA eligibility rules; some limited exceptions apply. Players may hold more than one non-FIFA nationality.

No.	Pos.	Nation	Player
1	GK	POR	João
2	DF	POR	Assis
3	DF	ANG	Gerson
4	DF	POR	Bruno Teixeira
5	MF	POR	Johnny
6	MF	POR	Manu
7	MF	POR	Andre Delfino
8	MF	POR	Rafael
10	FW	POR	Lisandro

No.	Pos.	Nation	Player
11	FW	POR	Claudio
14	MF	POR	Ruben
15	MF	ANG	Miguel Nenganga
18	DF	POR	Bruno Silva
22	DF	POR	Marco Cabaço
23	FW	POR	Falcão
24	GK	POR	Fábio Faia
30	MF	POR	Andrade

== Notable players ==
- (Portugal) Pedro Filipe Franco (1992–1994)
- (Portugal) Luís Alves (1993–1994)
- (Portugal) Sílvio Manuel Pereira (2007–08)
- (Portugal) Roderick Miranda
- (Cape Verde) José Filipe Correia Semedo
