= G.D.P. Costa de Caparica =

Portuguese football club

Grupo Desportivo dos Pescadores da Costa de Caparica
- Full name: Grupo Desportivo dos Pescadores da Costa de Caparica
- Nickname: O Pescadores (The fishermen)
- Founded: January 1, 1944
- Ground: Costa da Caparica, Portugal
- Capacity: N/A
- Chairman: N/A
- Manager: N/A
- League: Second Division
- 2017 - 2018: N/A

Grupo Desportivo dos Pescadores da Costa de Caparica is a football club, an institution and a public utility that is based in the city of Costa da Caparica, Almada in Portugal.

== History ==
G.D.P. Costa de Caparica was founded on January 1, 1944.

It ascended to the second division in the 1996–97 season.

In the 1998–1999 season, G.D.P. Costa de Caparica won its second division championship. In the 1996–97 season, it lost only one game. It reached ninth place in the National Championship of the Premier Division during the 1999–2000 season.

International players include:

- Juniors: Bruno Figueiredo, "B" – Gonçalo Osório, "A" – Pedro Murinello.
- International U-18 players: Allblack Mickael Noble

In the spring of 2000, 6 Beach Rugby was created in order to raise funds for the survival of the club and also for publicity. In 2001, Halcon Viagens organized the Beach Rugby tournament in Porto Santo 1,000 km west in the Azores.
