= A.D. Camacha =

Portuguese association football club

AD Camacha
- Full name: Associação Desportiva da Camacha
- Founded: 1978
- Ground: Campo Municipal da Nogueira, Madeira
- Capacity: 1,000
- Chairman: Celso Almeida e Silva
- Manager: Francisco Sá
- League: Campeonato de Portugal
- 2019–20: Madeira Divisão Honra, 1st (promoted)
- Website: https://web.archive.org/web/20100817010849/http://www.adcamacha.net/

Associação Desportiva da Camacha, known as A.D. Camacha, is a Portuguese football club from Santa Cruz, Madeira. Founded in 1978, they play in the Campeonato de Portugal. They play their home games in Campo Municipal da Nogueira, which has a capacity of 1,000. Their chairman is Celso Almeida e Silva and their manager is José Barros.

== History ==
AD Camacha were founded on 1 August 1978 and started off in the Madeira regional Premier league. Over the past 30 years they have managed to reach the Portuguese Second Division, the third-tier of Portuguese football. Campo Municipal da Nogueira has been their home stadium since their founding, and is normally sold out of tickets for their home games.

== Honours ==
- Terceira Divisão – Serie E: 1
  - 2008–09
- AF Madeira Championship: 2
  - 1989–90
  - 2019–20
- AF Madeira Cup: 5
  - 1989–90, 1991–92, 2000–01, 2003–04, 2010–11

== Current squad ==
As of 24 December 2021

Note: Flags indicate national team as defined under FIFA eligibility rules; some limited exceptions apply. Players may hold more than one non-FIFA nationality.

| No. | Pos. | Nation | Player |
|---|---|---|---|
| 1 | GK | POR | Duarte Nuno |
| 2 | DF | POR | João Diogo |
| 5 | DF | POR | Leo Abreu |
| 6 | DF | NGA | Bede Opara |
| 7 | FW | CPV | Rudy Monteiro |
| 8 | MF | POR | Huguinho |
| 9 | FW | BRA | Gabriel Fraga |
| 10 | MF | POR | Diogo Vieirinha |
| 11 | FW | POR | António Belo |
| 12 | GK | POR | Nuno Castro |
| 13 | DF | POR | Rodrigo Alírio |

| No. | Pos. | Nation | Player |
|---|---|---|---|
| 14 | DF | BRA | Odailson |
| 15 | MF | VEN | José Rainieri |
| 18 | FW | POR | Vitor Fati |
| 21 | MF | POR | Paulo Teles |
| 22 | MF | POR | Carlos Ponte |
| 23 | DF | POR | Jake Gonçalves |
| 24 | MF | CPV | Kenny Nascimento |
| 25 | MF | BRA | Luan Sérgio |
| 26 | GK | CMR | Ohoulo Framelin |
| 27 | DF | POR | Luís Miguel |
