= Serta =

Serta may refer to:

- Sertã, a municipality in central Portugal
- Sertã (parish), a civil parish in the municipality
- Serta (company), a mattress company based in the United States
- Serto, the western form of the Syriac alphabet
- An alternative spelling of Sêrtar County, Garzê Tibetan Autonomous Prefecture, People's Republic of China
- Serta, an ancient and titular bishopric of the Catholic Church in North Africa
- Sertraline, an SSRI used to treat depression and anxiety.
