= Fábio Cardoso =

Portuguese footballer (born 1994)

Personal information
- Full name: Fábio Rafael Rodrigues Cardoso
- Date of birth: 19 April 1994 (age 32)
- Place of birth: Águeda, Portugal
- Height: 1.87 m (6 ft 2 in)
- Position: Centre-back

Team information
- Current team: Sevilla
- Number: 15

Youth career
- 2003–2006: Águeda
- 2006–2012: Benfica

Senior career*
Years	Team	Apps	(Gls)
2012–2016	Benfica B	55	(3)
2015–2016	→ Paços Ferreira (loan)	38	(1)
2016–2017	Vitória Setúbal	23	(0)
2017–2018	Rangers	12	(0)
2018–2021	Santa Clara	88	(10)
2021–2025	Porto	49	(3)
2024–2025	→ Al Ain (loan)	17	(0)
2025–	Sevilla	4	(0)

International career
2009	Portugal U15	2	(0)
2009–2010	Portugal U16	9	(0)
2010	Portugal U17	3	(0)
2011–2012	Portugal U18	6	(0)
2012–2013	Portugal U19	7	(0)
2014	Portugal U20	4	(0)
- * Club domestic league appearances and goals as of 26 May 2026

Fábio Rafael Rodrigues Cardoso (born 19 April 1994) is a Portuguese professional footballer who plays as a centre-back for La Liga club Sevilla.

Formed at Benfica, where he played only in the reserves, he made over 150 Primeira Liga appearances for Paços de Ferreira, Vitória Setúbal, Santa Clara and Porto. Abroad, he had a brief spell in the Scottish Premiership with Rangers and in the UAE Pro League with Al Ain.

== Club career ==
=== Benfica B ===
Born in Águeda, Aveiro District, Cardoso played as a youth for hometown club R.D. Águeda before joining S.L. Benfica in 2006. On 11 August 2012, he made his debut with Benfica B in a 2012–13 Segunda Liga match against Braga B where he played 84 minutes as a centre back, partnering with Lionel Carole. On 19 December, he had his only call-up to the first team under manager Jorge Jesus, as one of five new faces for a Taça da Liga group game at Olhanense; he was an unused substitute in the 2–1 win.

He scored the only goal in a victory at Sporting B (0–1) on 5 January 2015. Six days later, he scored twice in a 3–2 win against Porto B.

On 15 January 2015, Benfica announced Cardoso's loan to fellow Primeira Liga club Paços de Ferreira until the end of the season. The deal was subsequently repeated for the following campaign. In 42 total matches for the northern club, he scored once, the only goal of a win at Vitória de Guimarães on 13 March 2016.

=== Vitória de Setúbal ===
On 7 July 2016, Cardoso signed a four-year contract with Primeira Liga side Vitória de Setúbal. He made 27 total appearances in his only season, and scored in a 2–1 win over Santa Clara on 26 October to qualify the team to the group stage of the Taça da Liga.

=== Rangers ===
In June 2017, Cardoso signed for Rangers on a three-year contract for a reported fee of around £1.3 million. He made his debut for Rangers against Progrès Niederkorn in the Europa League on 29 June 2017. Cardoso was picked less frequently after the departure of compatriot manager Pedro Caixinha, and was released from his contract with Rangers on 30 July 2018.

=== Santa Clara ===
Cardoso joined Santa Clara on a four-year deal the day after leaving Rangers. On his second league appearance on 19 August 2018, he scored the equaliser as the Azorean side came from 3–0 down at half time to draw at home to Braga. The following 11 January, when his former team Benfica visited the Estádio de São Miguel, he made an error that allowed Haris Seferovic to score and was then sent off just before half time for a foul on Pizzi.

=== Porto ===
On 1 July 2021, Cardoso signed a five-year deal at Porto. He made his debut on 28 September in a UEFA Champions League group game at home to Liverpool, due to a warm-up injury to Pepe; his team lost 5–1. His first season at the Estádio do Dragão ended with a league and cup double, though he played under half of the league fixtures and was unused for the cup final win over Tondela.

==== Al Ain (loan) ====
On 14 August 2024, Cardoso signed with Al Ain in UAE, on loan.

=== Sevilla ===
On 1 September 2025, Cardoso joined La Liga side Sevilla on a two-year contract.

== International career ==
Cardoso represented Portugal at the 2013 UEFA European Under-19 Football Championship. Cardoso also represented Portugal at Under-20 level during the 2014 Toulon Tournament.

Uncapped, Cardoso was named in the 55-man preliminary Portugal squad for the 2022 FIFA World Cup in Qatar. However, he didn't make the final cut.

== Career statistics ==
As of match played 22 September 2024

Appearances and goals by club, season and competition
Club	Season	League			National cup (Note: Includes Taça de Portugal, Scottish Cup)		League cup (Note: Includes Taça da Liga, Scottish League Cup, UAE League Cup)		Continental		Other		Total	
Club	Season	Division	Apps	Goals	Apps	Goals	Apps	Goals	Apps	Goals	Apps	Goals	Apps	Goals
Benfica B	2012–13	Segunda Liga	16	0	—		—		—		—		16	0
Benfica B	2013–14	Segunda Liga	27	0	—		—		—		—		27	0
Benfica B	2014–15	Segunda Liga	12	3	—		—		—		—		12	3
Benfica B	Total		55	3	—		—		—		—		55	3
Paços Ferreira (loan)	2014–15	Primeira Liga	16	0	0	0	0	0	—		—		16	0
Paços Ferreira (loan)	2015–16	Primeira Liga	22	1	1	0	4	0	—		—		27	1
Paços Ferreira (loan)	Total		38	1	1	0	4	0	—		—		43	1
Vitória Setúbal	2016–17	Primeira Liga	23	0	1	0	3	1	—		—		27	1
Rangers	2017–18	Scottish Premiership	12	0	1	0	3	0	2 (Note: Appearances in UEFA Europa League)	0	—		18	0
Santa Clara	2018–19	Primeira Liga	30	5	1	1	0	0	—		—		31	6
Santa Clara	2019–20	Primeira Liga	30	2	2	0	2	0	—		—		34	2
Santa Clara	2020–21	Primeira Liga	28	3	4	0	—		—		—		32	3
Santa Clara	Total		88	10	7	1	2	0	—		—		97	11
Porto	2021–22	Primeira Liga	14	0	5	0	0	0	2 (Note: Appearances in UEFA Champions League)	0	—		21	0
Porto	2022–23	Primeira Liga	17	2	4	1	5	0	4	0	0	0	30	3
Porto	2023–24	Primeira Liga	18	1	4	0	2	0	3	0	0	0	27	1
Porto	Total		49	3	13	1	7	0	9	0	0	0	78	4
Al Ain	2024–25	UAE Pro League	2	0	0	0	1	0	1 (Note: Appearance in AFC Champions League)	0	1 (Note: Appearance in FIFA Intercontinental Cup)	1	5	1
Sevilla	2025–26	La Liga	0	0	0	0	—		—		—		0	0
Career total			267	17	23	2	20	1	12	0	1	1	323	21

== Honours ==
Porto

- Primeira Liga: 2021–22
- Taça de Portugal: 2021–22, 2022–23, 2023–24
- Taça da Liga: 2022–23
