= 2021–22 Taça de Portugal =

Taça de Portugal Placard

Tournament details
- Country: Portugal
- Dates: 9 September 2021 – 22 May 2022
- Teams: 154

Final positions
- Champions: Porto (18th title)
- Runners-up: Tondela

Tournament statistics
- Matches played: 155
- Goals scored: 501 (3.23 per match)
- Top goal scorer: Evanilson (7 goals)

The 2021–22 Taça de Portugal (also known as Taça de Portugal Placard for sponsorship reasons) was the 82nd edition of the Taça de Portugal, the premier knockout competition in Portuguese football. A total of 154 clubs competed in this edition, including all teams from the top four tiers of the Portuguese football league system – excluding reserve or B teams, which are not eligible – and representatives of the fifth-tier District leagues and cups.

The competition began on 9 September 2021 with the first-round matches involving teams from the third, fourth and fifth tiers, and concluded on 22 May 2022 with the final at the Estádio Nacional in Oeiras between top-tier sides Porto and Tondela. Primeira Liga side and defending champions Braga were eliminated by Vizela in the fifth round. Porto beat Tondela 3–1 in the final to win their eighteenth title.

The winners qualified for the 2022–23 UEFA Europa League group stage and played the 2022 Supertaça Cândido de Oliveira against the 2021–22 Primeira Liga winners. As Porto secured qualification to the 2022–23 UEFA Champions League by league ranking, the cup winner's place in the Europa League was thus transferred to the league's fourth-placed team, Braga. Consequently, the league's fifth- and sixth-placed teams, Gil Vicente and Vitória de Guimarães, qualified instead for the 2022–23 UEFA Europa Conference League third and second qualifying rounds, respectively. As Porto also won the league title, they played the 2022 Supertaça match against the cup runners-up, Tondela.

== Format ==
Round	Clubs remaining	Clubs involved	Winners from previous round	New entries this round	Leagues entering at this round (tier)
First round	154	120	none	120	Liga 3 (3rd): 21 teams Campeonato de Portugal (4th): 58 teams District Football Associations (5th): 41 teams
Second round	110	92	44+32	16	Liga Portugal 2 (2nd): 16 teams
Third round	64	64	46	18	Primeira Liga (1st): 18 teams
Fourth round	32	32	32	none	none
Fifth round	16	16	16	none	none
Quarter-finals	8	8	8	none	none
Semi-finals	4	4	4	none	none
Final	2	2	2	none	none

== Teams ==
A total of 154 teams compete in the 2021–22 edition, comprising 18 teams from the Liga Portugal Bwin (tier 1), 16 teams from the Liga Portugal SABSEG (tier 2), 21 teams from the Liga 3 (tier 3 ), 58 teams from the Campeonato de Portugal (tier 4) and 41 teams from the District championships and cups (tier 4). (Note: Reserve teams are not allowed to compete in cups. For this reason, Benfica B and Porto B, who play in Liga Portugal 2; Braga B, Sporting CP B and Vitória de Guimarães B, who play in Liga 3; Marítimo B, Pedras Salgadas (Chaves satellite team) and Operário (Santa Clara satellite team) who play in Campeonato de Portugal, did not compete in this tournament.)

=== Liga Portugal Bwin ===
- Arouca
- Belenenses SAD
- Benfica
- Boavista
- Braga
- Estoril
- Famalicão
- Gil Vicente
- Marítimo
- Moreirense
- Paços de Ferreira
- Porto
- Portimonense
- Santa Clara
- Sporting CP
- Tondela
- Vitória de Guimarães
- Vizela

=== Liga Portugal SABSEG ===
- Académica
- Académico de Viseu
- Casa Pia
- Chaves
- Estrela da Amadora
- Farense
- Feirense
- Leixões
- Mafra
- Nacional
- Penafiel
- Rio Ave
- Sp. Covilhã
- Trofense
- Varzim
- Vilafranquense

=== Liga 3 ===
Série A

- Anadia
- Canelas 2010
- Fafe
- Felgueiras
- Lusitânia Lourosa
- Montalegre
- Oliveirense
- Pevidém
- Sanjoanense
- São João de Ver

Série B

- Alverca
- Amora
- Caldas
- Cova da Piedade
- Oliveira do Hospital
- Oriental Dragon
- Real SC
- Torreense
- União de Leiria
- União de Santarém
- Vitória de Setúbal

=== Campeonato de Portugal ===
Série A

- Camacha
- Câmara de Lobos
- Forjães
- Limianos
- Maria da Fonte
- Merelinense
- União da Madeira
- Vianense
- Vilaverdense

Série B

- Amarante
- Berço
- Macedo de Cavaleiros
- Mirandela
- Paredes
- Santa Marta de Penaguião
- São Martinho
- Tirsense
- Vila Meã
- Vila Real

Campeonato de Portugal

Série C

- Alvarenga
- Castro Daire
- Espinho
- Ferreira de Aves
- Gondomar
- Gouveia
- Leça
- Salgueiros
- União de Coimbra
- Valadares

Série D

- Benfica Castelo Branco
- Condeixa
- Fontinhas
- Idanhense
- Marinhense
- Oleiros
- Peniche
- Praiense
- Sertanense
- Vitória de Sernache

Série E

- Belenenses
- Coruchense
- Elvas
- Loures
- Rabo de Peixe
- Pêro Pinheiro
- Sacavenense
- Sintrense
- Sp. Ideal

Série F

- Barreirense
- Esperança de Lagos
- Imortal
- Juventude de Évora
- Louletano
- Moncarapachense
- Olhanense
- Pinhalnovense
- Serpa
- União Montemor

=== District Championships ===
Algarve FA

- Ferreiras
- Culatrense

Angra do Heroísmo FA

- Graciosa
- Lusitânia dos Açores

Aveiro FA

- União de Lamas
- Estarreja

Beja FA

- Vasco da Gama da Vidigueira
- Penedo Gordo

Braga FA

- Ribeirão
- Joane

Bragança FA

- Rebordelo
- Vinhais

Castelo Branco FA

- Águias do Moradal
- Vila Velha de Ródão

Coimbra FA

- Ançã
- Vigor da Mocidade

Évora FA

- Estrela de Vendas Novas
- Lusitano de Évora

Guarda FA

- Guarda Desportiva
- Trancoso

Horta FA

none

Leiria FA

- Pombal
- Matamourisquense

Lisbon FA

- Damaiense
- Olivais e Moscavide

Madeira FA

- Machico

Ponta Delgada FA

- São Roque
- Vasco da Gama V.F. do Campo

Portalegre FA

- Arronches e Benfica
- Eléctrico

Porto FA

- Alpendorada
- Pedroso

Santarém FA

- Abrantes e Benfica
- Glória do Ribatejo

Setúbal FA

- Moitense
- Comércio e Indústria

Viana do Castelo FA

- Âncora Praia
- Valenciano

Vila Real FA

- Cerva
- Régua

Viseu FA

- Cinfães
- Moimenta da Beira

== Schedule ==
All draws are held at the Portuguese Football Federation (FPF) headquarters in Oeiras. Match kick-off times are in WET (UTC±0) from the third round to the semi-finals, and in WEST (UTC+1) during the rest of the competition. The schedule was published along with all national men competitions on 22 July 2021.

Round	Draw date	Date(s)	Fixtures	Teams	Prize money (Note: These values don't include television transmission fee.)
First round	5 August 2021	9–12 September 2021	44	154 → 110	€3,000
Second round	15 September 2021	23–26 September 2021	46	110 → 64	€4,000
Third round	29 September 2021	15–17 October 2021	32	64 → 32	€5,000
Fourth round	21 October 2021	18–22 November 2021	16	32 → 16	€6,000
Fifth round	25 November 2021	21–23 December 2021	8	16 → 8	€9,000
Quarter-finals	27 December 2021	11–13 January 2022	4	8 → 4	€12,000
Semi-finals	27 December 2021	2–3 March 2022 (1st leg); 20–21 April 2022 (2nd leg)	4	4 → 2	€17,500
Final	27 December 2021	22 May 2022	1	2 → 1	€150,000 (losing finalist) €300,000 (winner)

== First round ==
A total of 120 teams representing the Liga 3, Campeonato de Portugal and the District Championships were involved in the first round draw, which was held on 5 August 2021. Thirty-two teams received a bye to the second round and the remaining teams were split into eight series according to geographical proximity. These teams were then paired inside their serie, with the first team drawn playing at home.

Byes

The following thirty-two teams received a bye to the second round:

- Graciosa (5)
- Vitória de Setúbal (3)
- Anadia (3)
- Valadares (4)
- Olivais e Moscavide (5)
- Estrela de Vendas Novas (5)
- Belenenses (4)
- União de Leiria (3)
- Oleiros (4)
- Condeixa (4)
- Moitense (5)
- Pevidém (3)
- Vinhais (5)
- Torreense (3)
- Esperança de Lagos (4)
- Ferreira de Aves (4)
- Coruchense (4)
- Vilaverdense (4)
- Alpendorada (5)
- São João de Ver (3)
- Serpa (4)
- Pombal (5)
- Pêro Pinheiro (4)
- Rabo de Peixe (4)
- Rebordelo (5)
- União Montemor (4)
- Oliveira do Hospital (3)
- Ribeirão (5)
- São Roque (5)
- Fontinhas (4)
- União da Madeira (4)
- Cova da Piedade (3)

Matches

9 September 2021 Serie A	Limianos (4)	3–2	(3) Montalegre	Ponte de Lima
16:00	Joel Marques 58'; Marco Costa 85'; Fábio Pimenta 90'	Report	André Martins 44'; Ruben Neves 61'	Stadium: Campo Cruzeiro; Referee: Tiago Neves

11 September 2021 Serie A	Mirandela (4)	0–1	(3) Fafe	Mirandela
16:00		Report	Leonardo Teixeira 53'	Stadium: Estádio São Sebastião; Referee: André Neto

11 September 2021 Serie A	Valenciano (5)	2–4	(4) Merelinense	Valença do Minho
17:00	Tiago Mendes 63'; Francisco Cerqueira 81'	Report	Thoma Boutin 16'; Zé Diogo 20'; Postiga 28', 77'	Stadium: Estádio Dr Lourenço Raymundo; Referee: Pedro Vieira

11 September 2021 Serie A	Cerva (5)	1–3	(4) Maria da Fonte	Ribeira de Pena
17:00	Tiago Oliveira 67' (pen.)	Report	João Antunes 51'; Hircane Graca 90' (pen.); Rui Neves 90'	Stadium: Campo Cavalinho; Referee: Nelson Cunha

11 September 2021 Serie A	Macedo de Cavaleiros (4)	1–0	(4) Forjães	Macedo de Cavaleiros
17:00	Carlos Barbosa 13'	Report		Stadium: Estadio Municipal Macedo Cavaleiros; Referee: André Santos

11 September 2021 Serie A	Vianense (4)	2–1	(5) Âncora Praia	Viana do Castelo
17:00	Mailo Cruz 22'; Guilherme Silva 37'	Report	Hugo Gomes 52'	Stadium: Estádio Dr José Matos; Referee: Edgar Baptista

11 September 2021 Serie B	Santa Marta de Penaguião (4)	0–3	(4) Camacha	Santa Marta de Penaguião
11:00		Report	Luis Mendonça 7'; José Abreu 24'; Vitor Abreu 58'	Stadium: Estádio Municipal Santa Marta Penaguião; Referee: Duarte Oliveira

11 September 2021 Serie B	Felgueiras (3)	3–0	(4) Câmara de Lobos	Felgueiras
15:00	Isaac Cisse 14', 49'; Fonseca 90' (pen.)	Report		Stadium: Estádio Municipal Dr Machado Matos; Referee: Humberto Teixeira

11 September 2021 Serie B	Machico (5)	0–5	(4) São Martinho	Machico
16:00		Report	Almeida 18', 23', 54'; Sele Davou 27'; Diogo Nunes 71'	Stadium: Estádio Machico; Referee: Luis Filipe

11 September 2021 Serie B	Berço (4)	2–1	(5) Joane	Guimarães
17:00	Túlio Silva 4'; João Silveira 12'	Report	Rui Silva 14'	Stadium: Campo Da Pista De Atletismo Gémeos Castro; Referee: Xavier Gomes

11 September 2021 Serie B	Vila Meã (4)	3–3 (a.e.t.) (4–2 p)	(4) Amarante	Amarante
17:00	Tiago Carneiro 3'; Rabiola 82' (pen.); Pedro Covelinhas 101'	Report	Miguel Tavares 21'; Bruno Guimarães 61'; Diogo Nunes 115' (pen.)	Stadium: Estadio Municipal Vila Meã; Referee: João Matos

12 September 2021 Serie B	Vila Real (4)	1–1 (a.e.t.) (5–4 p)	(4) Tirsense	Vila Real
17:00	Miguel Carreira 19'	Report	Júlio Melo 8'	Stadium: Campo do Calvário; Referee: Bruno Costa

11 September 2021 Serie C	Gondomar (4)	2–3	(4) Salgueiros	Gondomar
11:15	Idelino Colubali 39'; Fábio Pereira 50'	Report	Ivo Lemos 24'; Nelson Agra 76'; Abdoullahi Tanko 90'	Stadium: São Miguel; Referee: Carlos Teixeira

11 September 2021 Serie C	Canelas 2010 (3)	12–0	(5) Régua	Canelas
17:00	Mohamed Toure 5'; João Machado 8', 42'; Francisco Sousa 22', 25', 31'; Inácio Marques 56'; Leonardo Araújo 59', 68', 90'; Isaac Boakye 75'; Diogo Fernandes 76'	Report		Stadium: Estádio Clube Futebol Canelas 2010; Referee: José Bessa

11 September 2021 Serie C	Pedroso (5)	0–2	(4) Paredes	Pedroso e Seixezelo
17:00		Report	Seung Choi 58'; Nilo Leite 61'	Stadium: Complexo Desportivo Pedroso; Referee: Bruno Nunes

11 September 2021 Serie C	Moimenta da Beira (5)	2–3	(5) Cinfães	Moimenta da Beira
17:00	Sérgio Oliveira 15', 84' (pen.)	Report	João Carvalho 42'; Paulo Pereira 75'; José Magalhaes 90', pen.'	Stadium: Estadio Municipal Moimenta Beira; Referee: Luis Maximo

12 September 2021 Serie C	União de Lamas (5)	1–1 (a.e.t.) (6–7 p)	(4) Espinho	Santa Maria de Lamas
14:00	Antônio Magalhães 19'	Report	Kenedy Co 18'	Stadium: Estádio Comendador Henrique Amorim; Referee: Marcio Torres

12 September 2021 Serie C	Leça (4)	1–0	(3) Lusitânia Lourosa	Leça da Palmeira
16:45	Miguel Lopes 62'	Report		Stadium: Estádio do Leça FC; Referee: Rui Silva

11 September 2021 Serie D	Ançã (5)	1–0	(3) Sanjoanense	Ançã
17:00	Nuno Pereira 88'	Report		Stadium: Parque Desportivo De Ançã; Referee: Vasco Almeida

11 September 2021 Serie D	Vigor da Mocidade (5)	0–0 (a.e.t.) (4–5 p)	(4) União de Coimbra	Coimbra
17:00		Report		Stadium: Complexo Desportivo Do Vigor; Referee: André Mendes

11 September 2021 Serie D	Estarreja (5)	1–2	(5) Águias do Moradal	Estarreja
17:00	Carlos Tavares 84'	Report	Pedro Buaro 7'; Duarte Garrido 21' (o.g.)	Stadium: Estadio Do Clube Desportivo De Estarreja; Referee: João Costa

11 September 2021 Serie D	Oliveirense (3)	6–0	(5) Guarda Desportiva	Oliveira de Azeméis
17:00	Luizinho Silva 3'; José Marques 7'; João Paredes 34', 69', 90'; Simão Fernandes 52'	Report		Stadium: Estádio Carlos Osório; Referee: João Bento

11 September 2021 Serie D	Castro Daire (4)	1–0	(5) Trancoso	Castro Daire
17:00	Tiago Veiga 9'	Report		Stadium: Complexo Desportivo Castro Daire; Referee: Joel Pacheco

11 September 2021 Serie D	Alvarenga (4)	3–1	(4) Gouveia	Alvarenga
17:00	João Silva 1'; Michael Santos 17'; Lucas Reis 72'	Report	Luis Nunes 21'	Stadium: Dr Reinaldo Noronha; Referee: Bruno Cunha

11 September 2021 Serie E	Benfica Castelo Branco (4)	1–0	(5) Matamourisquense	Castelo Branco
17:00	Jailson Gomes 29'	Report		Stadium: Estádio Municipal Castelo Branco; Referee: Cláudio Durães

11 September 2021 Serie E	Marinhense (4)	1–2	(4) Idanhense	Marinha Grande
17:00	Miguel Velosa 53'	Report	Carlos Semedo 54', 80'	Stadium: Municipal da Marinha Grande; Referee: João Carvalho

11 September 2021 Serie E	Vila Velha de Ródão (5)	0–3	(4) Vitória de Sernache	Vila Velha de Ródão
17:00		Report	Fábio Santos 7'; Gonçalo Gomes 47'; Rafael Silva 81'	Stadium: Estadio Municipal Vila Velha Rodão; Referee: Helder Nunes

11 September 2021 Serie E	Sertanense (4)	2–0	(4) Peniche	Sertã
17:00	Nicolas Meek 12'; Luis Martins 80'	Report		Stadium: Campo Dr Marques Santos; Referee: Carlos Espadinha

11 September 2021 Serie E	Abrantes e Benfica (5)	2–4 (a.e.t.)	(3) Caldas	Abrantes
19:30	Antonio Matos 51'; Miguel Fernando 61'	Report	Joao Rodrigues 25' (pen.); Gonçalo Chaves 42' (pen.)	Stadium: Estádio Municipal Abrantes; Referee: Pedro Ramalho

11 September 2021 Serie F	União de Santarém (3)	0–0 (a.e.t.) (1–3 p)	(4) Loures	Santarém
11:00		Report		Stadium: Campo Chã Das Padeiras; Referee: Anzhony Rodrigues

11 September 2021 Serie F	Elvas (4)	0–2	(4) Sacavenense	Elvas
16:45		Report	Yannick Medina 18'; Arilton Almeida 85'	Stadium: Estádio Munic Domingos Carrilho Patalino; Referee: Josué Padeiro

11 September 2021 Serie F	Alverca (3)	6–0	(5) Eléctrico	Alverca do Ribatejo
17:00	Emerson Almeida 6'; Diogo Ribeiro 39'; Ricardo Rodrigues 45' (pen.); Jefferson Silva 65', 84'; Miguel Gonçalves 68' (o.g.)	Report		Stadium: Campo Futebol Clube Alverca; Referee: José Rodrigues

11 September 2021 Serie F	Glória do Ribatejo (5)	0–4	(4) Sintrense	Marinhais
17:00		Report	Gonçalo Pinto 13'; Hélio Varela 23'; Luis Mota 73'; Eduardo Marinho 89'	Stadium: Campo Nº1 Complexo Desp. Munic. Marinhais; Referee: Gonçalo Carreira

12 September 2021 Serie F	Arronches e Benfica (5)	3–3 (a.e.t.) (5–3 p)	(5) Vasco da Gama V.F. do Campo	Arronches
15:00	Guilherme Gomes 40'; Dante Santos 90'; Gonçalo Ludovico 113' (pen.)	Report	Pedro Mestre 70'; Ricardo Santos 80'; Paulo Furtado 96'	Stadium: Estadio Municipal Arronches; Referee: Diogo Trancadas

10 September 2021 Serie G	Real SC (3)	1–0	(4) Barreirense	Queluz
20:00	Rodrigo Monteiro 69'	Report		Stadium: Campo Nº 1 Real Sport Clube; Referee: João Pinto

11 September 2021 Serie G	Praiense (4)	0–1	(4) Sp. Ideal	Praia da Vitória
15:00		Report	Ismael Fatadjo 52'	Stadium: Estadio Municipal Praia Vitoria; Referee: Diogo Coelho

11 September 2021 Serie G	Lusitano de Évora (5)	1–2	(3) Oriental Dragon	Évora
17:00	Vitor Martelo 49'	Report	Nii Plange 16'; Wilson Januário 43'	Stadium: Campo Estrela; Referee: Bruno Vieira

11 September 2021 Serie G	Pinhalnovense (4)	0–2	(3) Amora	Pinhal Novo
17:00		Report	Edson Baessa 30'; António Xavier 43'	Stadium: Campo Jogos Santos Jorge; Referee: João Mendes

12 September 2021 Serie G	Damaiense (5)	3–1	(5) Lusitânia dos Açores	Damaia
11:00	Gonçalo Passarinho 71'; Christian Mate 90' (pen.); Pedro Alem 90'	Report	Dario Simão 86'	Stadium: Campo Damaiense; Referee: Joel Martins

11 September 2021 Serie H	Ferreiras (5)	1–0	(5) Penedo Gordo	Vandoma
17:00	Gonçalo Martins 20'	Report		Stadium: Complexo Desportivo da Nora; Referee: Diogo Gonçalves

11 September 2021 Serie H	Moncarapachense (4)	1–1 (a.e.t.) (1–4 p)	(5) Comércio e Indústria	Moncarapacho
17:00	Sérgio Abreu 47'	Report	Martim Mira 90'	Stadium: Estádio Dr.António João Eusébio; Referee: Ricardo Diogo

11 September 2021 Serie H	Vasco da Gama da Vidigueira (5)	1–2	(4) Imortal	Vidigueira
17:00	Thalison Costa 90'	Report	Mateus Vieira 46'; Alexandre Portela 55'	Stadium: Estadio Municipal De Vidigueira; Referee: David Duarte

11 September 2021 Serie H	Olhanense (4)	1–0	(4) Juventude de Évora	Olhão
17:00	Ricardo Matos 17'	Report		Stadium: Estádio José Arcanjo; Referee: João Marques

11 September 2021 Serie H	Culatrense (5)	1–2	(4) Louletano	Faro
17:00	Claudio Pacheco 15' (pen.)	Report	Anibal Andre 11'; Erik Silva 33' (pen.)	Stadium: Campo Complexo Desportivo Penha; Referee: André Vasques

== Second round ==
A total of 92 teams were involved in the second round draw, which was held on 15 September 2021. The 16 teams from the Liga Portugal 2 joined the 44 winners from first round and the 32 teams that received a bye to the second round. All Liga Portugal 2 teams played this round as visitors.

Number of teams per tier entering this round
Primeira Liga (1)	Liga Portugal 2 (2)	Liga 3 (3)	Campeonato de Portugal (4)	District Championships (5)	Total
18 / 18	16 / 16	17 / 21	42 / 58	17 / 41	110 / 154

23 September 2021	Real SC (3)	2–1 (a.e.t.)	(3) Cova da Piedade	Queluz
19:45	Micael Borges 74'; Gustavo Souza 92'	Report	Celsinho 72'	Stadium: Campo Nº 1 Real Sport Clube; Referee: Miguel Silva

24 September 2021	Alverca (3)	3–1	(4) Vila Real	Alverca do Ribatejo
19:30	Gustavo Miranda 3'; João Sousa 26'; Ricardo Rodrigues 89'	Report	Miguel Carreira 90'	Stadium: Campo Futebol Clube Alverca; Referee: Gonçalo Neves

25 September 2021	Vianense (4)	0–2	(3) Vitória de Setúbal	Viana do Castelo
11:00		Report	Rodrigo Pereira 74'; José Varela 86'	Stadium: Estádio Dr José Matos; Referee: Marco Cruz

25 September 2021	União de Coimbra (4)	2–1	(5) Graciosa	Coimbra
11:00	Narcizo Neto 62' (o.g.); David Casimiro 66'	Report	Moacir Soares 90'	Stadium: Campo da Arregaça; Referee: Tiago Martins

25 September 2021	São João de Ver (3)	1–3 (a.e.t.)	(2) Leixões	São João de Ver
14:00	Gilberto Seidi 90'	Report	Jefferson Encada 47'; Ben Traore 117'; Adewale Sapara 120'	Stadium: Estádio Clube São João de Ver; Referee: David Silva

25 September 2021	Fontinhas (4)	0–1	(3) Torreense	Fontinhas
14:00		Report	Lameira 85'	Stadium: Campo Municipal Dr. Durval Monteiro; Referee: João Bernardino

25 September 2021	Limianos (4)	0–1	(4) Berço	Ponte de Lima
15:00		Report	Helder Lopes 84'	Stadium: Campo Cruzeiro; Referee: Renato Gonçalves

25 September 2021	Águias do Moradal (5)	2–1	(5) Damaiense	Oleiros
15:00	David Souza 46'; Edison Antônio 77'	Report	Christian Mate 67' (pen.)	Stadium: Campo Ventoso; Referee: Francisco Coutinho

25 September 2021	São Martinho (4)	0–1	(4) Benfica Castelo Branco	São Martinho do Campo
15:00		Report	Jaílson Gomes 13'	Stadium: Campo Comendador Abílio Ferreira De Oliveira; Referee: Marco Pereira

25 September 2021	Caldas (3)	1–0	(3) Amora	Caldas da Rainha
15:00	João Rodrigues 24'	Report		Stadium: Campo da Mata; Referee: João Pinto

25 September 2021	Canelas 2010 (3)	2–4	(2) Casa Pia	Canelas
15:00	Francisco Sousa 45' (pen.); Samuel Martins 64'	Report	Luis Simão 59' (o.g.); Leandro Sanca 62', 84'; Zidane Banjaqui 80'	Stadium: Estádio de Canelas; Referee: Tiago Martins

25 September 2021	Condeixa (4)	4–3 (a.e.t.)	(4) Esperança de Lagos	Condeixa-a-Nova
15:00	Emmanuel Evaristus 11'; Mateus Lima 64'; Flávio Carvalho 120'; Jovhany Nguema 120'	Report	Juan Costa 22' (pen.); Maxuel Silva 48'	Stadium: Estádio Municipal de Condeixa-a-Nova; Referee: Fa Sanha

25 September 2021	Espinho (4)	1–0	(4) Merelinense	Espinho
15:00	Betinho 72'	Report		Stadium: Estádio Comendador Manuel Violas; Referee: Tiago Dias

25 September 2021	Estrela de Vendas Novas (5)	0–2	(4) Paredes	Vendas Novas
15:00		Report	Helder Teixeira 45'; Claudio Madureira 56' (pen.)	Stadium: Estádio Municipal Vendas Novas; Referee: João Bernardo

25 September 2021	Ferreira de Aves (4)	0–1 (a.e.t.)	(2) Académico de Viseu	Sátão
15:00		Report	Luis Andrade 97'	Stadium: Estádio do Montrangão; Referee: João Afonso

25 September 2021	União Montemor (4)	0–2	(4) Vilaverdense	Montemor-o-Novo
15:00		Report	Rui Furtado 64' (pen.); Edmílson Filho 80'	Stadium: Estádio 1º de Maio; Referee: Diogo Amado

25 September 2021	Imortal (4)	0–2	(2) Vilafranquense	Albufeira
15:00		Report	Mouhamed Belkheir 51'; Anderson Silva 90'	Stadium: Municipal de Albufeira; Referee: José Gorjão

25 September 2021	Loures (4)	2–2 (a.e.t.) (9–10 p)	(3) Oriental Dragon	Loures
15:00	Diogo Lamas 10', 12'	Report	Abou Toure 16' (pen.); João Maia 50'	Stadium: Campo José da Silva Faria; Referee: Pedro Ramalho

25 September 2021	Olhanense (4)	1–0	(4) Alvarenga	Olhão
15:00	Boubacar Diarra 48'	Report		Stadium: Estádio José Arcanjo; Referee: Diogo Rosa

25 September 2021	Oliveira do Hospital (3)	5–0	(4) União da Madeira	Oliveira do Hospital
15:00	Régis N'do 26'; Coulibaly Ibrahim 33'; Adílio Sanches 56'; Ronaldo Afonso 73'; Diogo Martins 78'	Report		Stadium: Estádio Municipal de Oliveira do Hospital; Referee: Sérgio Guelho

25 September 2021	Oliveirense (3)	3–0	(5) Arronches e Benfica	Oliveira de Azeméis
15:00	Luizinho Silva 16'; José Marques 29'; João Paredes 52'	Report		Stadium: Estádio Carlos Osório; Referee: Pedro Ferreira

25 September 2021	Pevidém (3)	1–3 (a.e.t.)	(2) Trofense	Pevidém
15:00	Sérgio Duarte 26'	Report	Barthelemydiedhiou 18'; Mohamed Achouri 96'; André Alves 112'	Stadium: Complexo Desportivo do Pevidém; Referee: Claudio Pereira

25 September 2021	Pombal (5)	0–4	(4) Leça	Pombal
15:00		Report	Diogo Ramalho 20'; Nuno Barbosa 47', 59'; Jorge Monteiro 78'	Stadium: Estádio Municipal do Pombal; Referee: Ricardo Martins

25 September 2021	Rebordelo (5)	1–2	(5) Cinfães	Rebordelo
15:00	Ronaldo Cruz 5'	Report	Gabriel Vulcano 43', 66'	Stadium: Campo de Jogos de Rebordelo; Referee: Miguel Silva

25 September 2021	Sacavenense (4)	0–4	(3) Fafe	Sacavém
15:00		Report	Didi 11'; Rolando Almeida 11', 45'; Elizio Albues 83'	Stadium: Campo do Sacavenense; Referee: Rui Soares

25 September 2021	Sertanense (4)	0–1	(2) Mafra	Sertã
15:00		Report	Leandro Silva 83'	Stadium: Dr. Marques dos Santos; Referee: Marcos Brazão

25 September 2021	Sintrense (4)	1–1 (a.e.t.) (7–6 p)	(4) Macedo de Cavaleiros	Sintra
15:00	Danílson Tavares 26'	Report	Carlos Barbosa 4'	Stadium: Estádio do Sport União Sintrense; Referee: Henrique Caldeira

25 September 2021	Comércio e Indústria (5)	1–1 (a.e.t.) (5–6 p)	(3) União de Leiria	Setúbal
15:00	Jacinto Monteiro 56' (pen.)	Report	Jair Silva 49'	Stadium: Campo da Bela Vista; Referee: João Bento

25 September 2021	Idanhense (4)	0–2	(2) Sp. Covilhã	Idanha-a-Nova
15:00		Report	Heliton Santos 11'; Devid Silva 90'	Stadium: Estádio Municipal de Idanha-a-Nova; Referee: Flávio Lima

25 September 2021	São Roque (5)	0–3	(2) Farense	Ponta Delgada
15:00		Report	Bruno Paz 16'; Pedro Almeida 51', 59'	Stadium: Campo de Jogos de São Roque; Referee: Rui Lima

25 September 2021	Vila Meã (4)	1–5	(2) Feirense	Amarante
15:00	Ivandro Soares 68'	Report	Esmiraldo Silva 37', 45', 54'; Stivan Petkov 50'; Charles Atshimene 77'	Stadium: Estádio Municipal de Vila Meã; Referee: Iancu Vasilica

25 September 2021	Vinhais (5)	0–3	(2) Nacional	Vinhais
15:00		Report	Daniel Rodrigues 37' (pen.); Witiness Quembo 50'; Mabroukhaiça Rouai 89'	Stadium: Estádio Municipal de Vinhais; Referee: Carlos Macedo

25 September 2021	Alpendorada (5)	1–2 (a.e.t.)	(2) Académica	Alpendurada e Matos
15:00	Marcos Pinto 90' (pen.)	Report	Hugo Seco 13'; Daniel Costa 106'	Stadium: Estádio Municipal de Alpendorada; Referee: Helder Carvalho

25 September 2021	Belenenses (4)	5–3	(4) Pêro Pinheiro	Belém
15:00	Micael Simão 15' (o.g.); Carimo Conte 38'; Euclides Tavares 40', 49', 62'	Report	Eduino Junior 42'; Claudio Anjos 55'; Francisco Miranda 57'	Stadium: Estádio do Restelo; Referee: Álvaro Santos

25 September 2021	Moitense (5)	2–1	(5) Ançã	Moita
15:00		Report		Stadium: Juncal Desportos; Referee: Eduardo Brites

25 September 2021	Anadia (3)	3–1	(4) Coruchense	Anadia
16:00	Elson Tavares 28' (pen.); Diogo Costa 90'; Brian Cipenga 90'	Report	Antônio Sanca 4'	Stadium: Estádio Engº Sílvio Henriques Cerveira; Referee: Fábio Silva

25 September 2021	Rabo de Peixe (4)	2–3 (a.e.t.)	(4) Castro Daire	Rabo de Peixe
16:00	Dougllas Trugilho 18'; Alexandre Miguel 90'	Report	Pedro Teles 72'; Luis Augusto 76'; Gonçalo Silva 117'	Stadium: Campo de Jogos Bom Jesus; Referee: André Pereira

25 September 2021	Ferreiras (5)	0–3	(2) Estrela da Amadora	Albufeira
17:00		Report	Diogo Pinto 2'; Madson Silva 39'; Paulo Araújo 80'	Stadium: Estádio da Nora; Referee: Hugo Silva

25 September 2021	Camacha (4)	6–1	(5) Ribeirão	Madeira
17:00	Julian Chamorro 9', 68' (o.g.); Luis Vieira 18'; Rudy Monteiro 22'; Gabriel Fraga 28' (pen.); José Abreu 42'	Report	Igor Santos 53'	Stadium: Campo Municipal da Nogueira; Referee: Paulo Raposo

25 September 2021	Louletano (4)	3–1	(4) Salgueiros	Faro
17:00	Álvaro Gomes 42', 73'; Erik Silva 90'	Report	Nelson Agra 30' (pen.)	Stadium: Estádio Algarve; Referee: Pedro Viveiros

25 September 2021	Serpa (4)	4–0	(5) Olivais e Moscavide	Serpa
17:00	Natalino Silva 41' (o.g.); Rodrigo Souto 67'; Malam Fati 74'; João Graça 90'	Report		Stadium: Complexo Desportivo Manuel Baião; Referee: João Branco

25 September 2021	Felgueiras (3)	2–0	(2) Chaves	Felgueiras
20:00	Fonseca 46'; Diogo Santos 83' (pen.)	Report		Stadium: Estádio Dr. Machado de Matos; Referee: Manuel Mota

26 September 2021	Oleiros (4)	0–2	(2) Varzim	Oleiros
11:00		Report	Luis Silva 63'; TWelesson Borges 90'	Stadium: Estádio Municipal de Oleiros; Referee: Helder Malheiro

26 September 2021	Sp. Ideal (4)	0–3	(4) Valadares	Ribeira Grande
11:00		Report	Nelson Cunha 16'; Rafael Fontes 71'; Pedro Silva 81'	Stadium: Estádio Municipal da Ribeira Grande; Referee: Paulo Ferras

26 September 2021	Vitória de Sernache (4)	1–3	(2) Rio Ave	Cernache do Bonjardim
14:00	Romário Rodrigues 18'	Report	Ruben Gonçalves 8'; Abdul Yakubu 12'; João Costa 29'	Stadium: Estádio Municipal Nuno Álvares Pereira; Referee: André Narciso

26 September 2021	Maria da Fonte (4)	0–1	(2) Penafiel	Póvoa de Lanhoso
15:00		Report	Roberto Rodrigo 62'	Stadium: Campo dos Moínhos Novos; Referee: João Casegas

== Third round ==
A total of 64 teams were involved in the third round draw, which was held on 29 September 2021. The 18 teams from the Primeira Liga joined the 46 winners from second round. All Primeira Liga teams played this round as visitors.

Number of teams per tier entering this round
Primeira Liga (1)	Liga Portugal 2 (2)	Liga 3 (3)	Campeonato de Portugal (4)	District Championships (5)	Total
18 / 18	15 / 16	12 / 21	16 / 58	3 / 41	64 / 154

15 October 2021	Académica (2)	0–4	(1) Famalicão	Coimbra
18:00		Report	Alexandre Penetra 15'; Iván Jaime 18'; Heriberto Tavares 25'; Simon Banza 63'	Stadium: Estádio Cidade de Coimbra; Referee: Manuel Oliveira

15 October 2021	Sintrense (4)	0–5	(1) Porto	Sintra
18:45		Report	Sérgio Oliveira 17', 27'; Evanilson 55', 69'; Toni Martínez 76'	Stadium: Estádio do Sport União Sintrense; Referee: André Narciso

15 October 2021	Belenenses (4)	0–4	(1) Sporting CP	Belém
20:45		Report	Tomás 2', 70'; Cabral 76' (pen.); Santos 79' (pen.)	Stadium: Estádio do Restelo; Referee: Gustavo Correia

16 October 2021	Oliveira do Hospital (3)	0–1	(1) Vitória de Guimarães	Oliveira do Hospital
11:00		Report	Marcus Edwards 16'	Stadium: Estádio Municipal de Oliveira do Hospital; Referee: Vitor Ferreira

16 October 2021	Oriental Dragon (3)	2–3 (a.e.t.)	(1) Moreirense	Pinhal Novo
15:00	João Maia 30'; Filipe Gaspar 75'	Report	Gonçalo Franco 48'; Rafael Martins 59'; André Luis 112'	Stadium: Estádio Alfredo da Silva; Referee: João Gonçalves

16 October 2021	Paredes (4)	3–1	(2) Académico de Viseu	Paredes
15:00	Pedro Correia 12', 69'; Henrique Santos 58'	Report	Famana Quizera 29'	Stadium: Cidade Desportiva De Paredes; Referee: Carlos Macedo

16 October 2021	Berço (4)	1–2 (a.e.t.)	(1) Belenenses SAD	Guimarães
15:00	Helder Lopes 72'	Report	Afonso Sousa 40'; Alioune Ndour 120'	Stadium: Campo Gémeos Castro; Referee: Hugo Silva

16 October 2021	Leixões (2)	5–1	(4) Vilaverdense	Matosinhos
15:00	Yuri 41'; Kiki 51'; Jefferson Encada 63'; Thalis 74'; Luan Santos 75'	Report	José Cerqueira 65'	Stadium: Estádio do Mar; Referee: Bruno Pires Costa

16 October 2021	Valadares (4)	1–3	(2) Casa Pia	Vila Nova de Gaia
15:00	Nelson Cunha 9'	Report	Jota Silva 8'; Lelo 62'; João Vieira 69'	Stadium: Complexo Desportivo Valadares; Referee: José Gorjão

16 October 2021	Camacha (4)	1–2	(1) Tondela	Madeira
15:00	Gabriel Fraga 5'	Report	Manu Hernando 3'; Salvador Agra 90'	Stadium: Campo Municipal da Nogueira; Referee: Claudio Pereira

16 October 2021	Espinho (4)	0–1 (a.e.t.)	(3) Caldas	Espinho
15:00		Report	João Rodrigues 91'	Stadium: Estádio Comendador Manuel Violas; Referee: Antônio Moreira

16 October 2021	Vilafranquense (2)	3–2 (a.e.t.)	(3) Real SC	Vila Franca de Xira
15:00	Anderson Silva 18', 111', 114'	Report	Gustavo Souza 1'; Micael Borges 120'	Stadium: Campo do Cevadeiro; Referee: Helder Carvalho

16 October 2021	União de Leiria (3)	0–2	(1) Santa Clara	Leiria
16:00		Report	Gonçalo Gregório 37' (o.g.); Lincoln 61'	Stadium: Estádio Dr. Magalhães Pessoa; Referee: Manuel Mota

16 October 2021	Trofense (2)	1–2 (a.e.t.)	(1) Benfica	Trofa
20:15	Pachu 80'	Report	Everton 21'; Almeida 94'	Stadium: Estádio CD Trofense; Referee: António Nobre

17 October 2021	Varzim (2)	2–2 (a.e.t.) (3–2 p)	(1) Marítimo	Póvoa de Varzim
11:00				Stadium: Estádio do Varzim Sport Club

17 October 2021	Vitória de Setúbal (3)	0–2	(1) Vizela	Setúbal
14:00		Report	Alex Mendez 27'; Guilherme Schettine 37'	Stadium: Estádio do Bonfim; Referee: Hugo Miguel

17 October 2021	Serpa (4)	0–0 (a.e.t.) (7–6 p)	(2) Sp. Covilhã	Serpa
15:00		Report		Stadium: Complexo Desportivo Manuel Baião; Referee: Ricardo Baixinho

17 October 2021	Felgueiras (3)	0–1	(1) Estoril	Felgueiras
15:00		Report	Leonardo Acevedo 36' (pen.)	Stadium: Estádio Dr. Machado de Matos; Referee: Fábio Veríssimo

17 October 2021	Moitense (5)	0–5	(1) Braga	Moita
15:00		Report	Mario González 39'; Bruno Rodrigues 54'; Roger Fernandes 81'; Vítor Oliveira 85', 89'	Stadium: Estádio Alfredo Silva; Referee: Miguel Nogueira

17 October 2021	Torreense (3)	1–1 (a.e.t.) (3–1 p)	(3) Fafe	Torres Vedras
15:00	Rui Silva 90' (pen.)	Report	Leonardo Teixeira 11'	Stadium: Estádio Manuel Marques; Referee: Bruno Rebocho

17 October 2021	Cinfães (5)	0–4	(2) Farense	Cinfães
15:00		Report	Pedro Henrique 23', 41' (pen.); Jorge Fraga 37' (o.g.); Cristian Ponde 76'	Stadium: Estádio Municipal Cerveira Pinto; Referee: João Casegas

17 October 2021	Leça (4)	1–1 (a.e.t.) (2–1 p)	(1) Arouca	Leça da Palmeira
15:00	Nuno Barbosa 33'	Report	Eboué Kouassi 89'	Stadium: Estádio do Leça FC; Referee: João Pinheiro

17 October 2021	Castro Daire (4)	2–2 (a.e.t.) (1–4 p)	(4) Olhanense	Castro Daire
15:00	Diogo Braz 44', 73'	Report	Ricardo Matos 45'; Xavier Venâncio 87'	Stadium: Complexo Desportivo de Castro Daire; Referee: Daniel Cardoso

17 October 2021	Alverca (3)	4–1	(3) Anadia	Alverca do Ribatejo
15:00	João Sousa 11'; Ricardo Rodrigues 53'; Jorge Bernardo 70' (pen.); Eurico Neto 90'	Report	Fasuto Lourenço 19'	Stadium: Campo Futebol Clube Alverca; Referee: Bruno Vieira

17 October 2021	Louletano (4)	1–2	(2) Estrela da Amadora	Faro
15:00	Álvaro Gomes 8'	Report	Paulo Araújo 27', 90'	Stadium: Estádio Algarve; Referee: Flávio Lima

17 October 2021	Benfica Castelo Branco (4)	1–2	(2) Penafiel	Castelo Branco
15:00	Vitinha 89' (o.g.)	Report	Sunday Akoh 27'; Ruca 80'	Stadium: Estádio Municipal Vale do Romeiro; Referee: Iancu Vasilica

17 October 2021	Mafra (2)	3–0	(4) União de Coimbra	Mafra
15:00	Bernardo Ferreira 18' (o.g.); Kikas 35'; Rodrigo Martins 79'	Report		Stadium: Estádio Municipal de Mafra; Referee: Marcos Brazão

17 October 2021	Condeixa (4)	0–5	(1) Gil Vicente	Condeixa-a-Nova
15:00		Report	Boubacar Hanne 12', 37'; Diogo Silva 49'; Samuel Lino 75', 90'	Stadium: Estádio Municipal de Condeixa-a-Nova; Referee: Fábio Melo

17 October 2021	Feirense (2)	3–1	(2) Nacional	Santa Maria da Feira
15:00		Report		Stadium: Estádio Marcolino de Castro; Referee: Luís Godinho

17 October 2021	Águias do Moradal (5)	0–3	(1) Paços de Ferreira	Oleiros
15:00		Report	Zé Uilton 30'; Flávio Ramos 66'; João Pedro 89'	Stadium: Campo Ventoso; Referee: Nuno Almeida

17 October 2021	Oliveirense (3)	3–3 (a.e.t.) (4–5 p)	(1) Portimonense	Oliveira de Azeméis
17:00	Luizinho Silva 35'; João Paredes 85'; Filipe Alves 119'	Report	Renato Júnior 19', 55'; Simão Fernandes 113'	Stadium: Estádio Carlos Osório; Referee: Helder Malheiro

17 October 2021	Rio Ave (2)	4–0	(1) Boavista	Vila do Conde
20:00	Zé Manuel 14' (pen.); Guga 73'; Gabrielzinho 86', 89'	Report		Stadium: Estádio dos Arcos; Referee: Rui Costa

== Fourth round ==
A total of 32 teams were involved in the fourth round draw, which was held on 21 October 2021.

Number of teams per tier entering this round
Primeira Liga (1)	Liga Portugal 2 (2)	Liga 3 (3)	Campeonato de Portugal (4)	District Championships (5)	Total
15 / 18	10 / 16	3 / 21	4 / 58	0 / 41	32 / 154

18 November 2021	Sporting CP (1)	2–1	(2) Varzim	Lisbon
20:15	Pedro Gonçalves 67', 88' (pen.)	Report	Heliardo 78' (pen.)	Stadium: Estádio José Alvalade; Referee: André Narciso

19 November 2021	Casa Pia (2)	3–1	(2) Farense	Lisbon
16:00	Jota Silva 6'; Nermin Zolotić 19'; Derick Poloni 90+5'	Report	Pedro Henrique 66'	Stadium: Estádio Pina Manique; Referee: Gustavo Correia

19 November 2021	Penafiel (2)	0–3	(1) Portimonense	Penafiel
18:45		Report	Aylton Boa Morte 26', 30'; Iván Angulo 42'	Stadium: Estádio Municipal 25 de Abril; Referee: Manuel Mota

19 November 2021	Benfica (1)	4–1	(1) Paços de Ferreira	Lisbon
20:45	Grimaldo 78'; Seferovic 82'; Silva 87'; Everton 90+3'	Report	Santos 52'	Stadium: Estádio da Luz; Referee: Manuel Oliveira

20 November 2021	Leça (4)	1–0	(1) Gil Vicente	Leça da Palmeira
11:00	Rosado 65'	Report		Stadium: Estádio do Leça FC; Referee: Claudio Pereira

20 November 2021	Vizela (1)	2–0	(2) Estrela da Amadora	Vizela
14:00	Mendez 9'; Kiko Bondoso 52'	Report		Stadium: Estádio do FC Vizela; Referee: Luís Godinho

20 November 2021	Rio Ave (2)	2–1	(4) S.C. Olhanense	Vila do Conde
17:00	Yakubu 58', 68'	Report	Matos 10' (pen.)	Stadium: Estádio dos Arcos; Referee: Helder Malheiro

20 November 2021	Braga (1)	6–0	(1) Santa Clara	Braga
18:00	Vítor Oliveira 3', 8', 16', 51'; Paulo Oliveira 58'; Galeno 88' (pen.)	Report		Stadium: Estádio Municipal de Braga; Referee: João Pinheiro

20 November 2021	Alverca (3)	1–2	(1) Famalicão	Alverca do Ribatejo
19:45	Rodrigues 31'	Report	Brazão 69'; Banza 72'	Stadium: Campo Futebol Clube Alverca; Referee: Joao Goncalves

20 November 2021	Porto (1)	5–1	(2) Feirense	Porto
20:15	Uribe 15'; Otávio 39', 45'; Evanilson 57'; Conceição 72' (pen.)	Report	Vargas 67'	Stadium: Estádio do Dragão; Referee: Hugo Miguel

21 November 2021	Serpa (4)	0–5	(1) Estoril	Serpa
11:00		Report	Leonardo Acevedo 14', 54'; Chiquinho 18'; Francisco Geraldes 57'; André Clóvis 76'	Stadium: Complexo Desportivo Manuel Baião; Referee: Antônio Nobre

21 November 2021	Vilafranquense (2)	0–1	(2) Mafra	Vila Franca de Xira
14:00		Report	Gabriel 72'	Stadium: Campo do Cevadeiro; Referee: Fábio Melo

21 November 2021	Paredes (4)	1–0	(3) Torreense	Paredes
14:00	Pedro Correia 32'	Report		Stadium: Cidade Desportiva De Paredes; Referee: João Mendes

21 November 2021	Caldas (3)	3–5	(1) Belenenses SAD	Caldas da Rainha
14:00	João Rodrigues 6' (pen.), 32'; Thomas Militão 58'	Report	Andrija Luković 3'; Pedro Nuno 18', 52'; Diogo Calila 54'; Afonso Sousa 90'	Stadium: Campo da Mata; Referee: David Silva

21 November 2021	Moreirense (1)	3–2	(1) Vitória de Guimarães	Moreira de Cónegos
16:45	Yan 20', 45'; Steven Vitória 60'	Report	Rafa Soares 89', 90+3'	Stadium: Parque Moreira de Cónegos; Referee: Rui Costa

22 November 2021	Tondela (1)	3–1	(2) Leixões	Tondela
19:45	Juan Manuel Boselli 36'; Tiago Dantas 84'; Jhon Murillo 90+1'	Report	Léo Bolgado 90'	Stadium: Estádio João Cardoso; Referee: Miguel Nogueira

== Fifth round ==
A total of 16 teams were involved in the fifth round draw, which was held on 25 November 2021.

Number of teams per tier entering this round
Primeira Liga (1)	Liga Portugal 2 (2)	Liga 3 (3)	Campeonato de Portugal (4)	District Championships (5)	Total
11 / 18	3 / 16	0 / 21	2 / 58	0 / 41	16 / 154

21 December 2021	Tondela (1)	3–1	(1) Estoril	Tondela
18:45	Tiago Dantas 45'; Juan Manuel Boselli 51'; Daniel dos Anjos 68'	Report	Leonardo Acevedo 18' (pen.)	Stadium: Estádio João Cardoso; Referee: João Pinheiro

21 December 2021	Famalicão (1)	1–1 (a.e.t.) (2–4 p)	(1) Portimonense	Vila Nova de Famalicão
20:45	Bruno Rodrigues 83'	Report	Aylton Boa Morte 46'	Stadium: Estádio Municipal 22 de Junho; Referee: Manuel Oliveira

22 December 2021	Leça (4)	1–1 (a.e.t.) (6–5 p)	(4) Paredes	Leça da Palmeira
14:00	Nani 27'	Report	Ismael Pinto 41' (pen.)	Stadium: Estádio do Leça FC; Referee: João Gonçalves

22 December 2021	Casa Pia (2)	1–2	(1) Sporting CP	Lisbon
20:45	Jota Silva 8'	Report	Sebastián Coates 32'; Pablo Sarabia 57'	Stadium: Estádio Pina Manique; Referee: Rui Costa

23 December 2021	Mafra (2)	3–1	(1) Moreirense	Mafra
14:00	Bura 43' (pen.); Pedrinho 79'; Andrezinho 85'	Report	Yan 27'	Stadium: Estádio Municipal de Mafra; Referee: Andre Narciso

23 December 2021	Rio Ave (2)	1–1 (a.e.t.) (6–5 p)	(1) Belenenses SAD	Vila do Conde
17:00	Hugo 42'	Report	Pedro Nuno 9'	Stadium: Estádio dos Arcos; Referee: Antonio Nobre

23 December 2021	Vizela (1)	1–0	(1) Braga	Vizela
18:45	Moreira 9'	Report		Stadium: Estádio do FC Vizela; Referee: Nuno Almeida

23 December 2021	Porto (1)	3–0	(1) Benfica	Porto
20:45	Evanilson 1', 31'; Vitinha 7'	Report		Stadium: Estádio do Dragão; Referee: Fábio Veríssimo

== Quarter-finals ==
The quarter-final pairings was decided on 27 December 2021.

Number of teams per tier entering this round
Primeira Liga (1)	Liga Portugal 2 (2)	Liga 3 (3)	Campeonato de Portugal (4)	District Championships (5)	Total
5 / 18	2 / 16	0 / 21	1 / 58	0 / 41	8 / 154

11 January 2022	Leça (4)	0–4	(1) Sporting CP	Leça da Palmeira
20:45		Report	Tabata 12', 80'; Nunes 31'; Santos 90+2'	Stadium: Estádio do Leça FC; Referee: Manuel Mota

12 January 2022	Rio Ave (2)	0–1 (a.e.t.)	(1) Tondela	Vila do Conde
18:45		Report	Dadashov 96'	Stadium: Estádio dos Arcos; Referee: Artur Soares Dias

12 January 2022	Vizela (1)	1–3	(1) Porto	Vizela
20:45	Cassiano 24'	Report	Uribe 8'; Vieira 65' (pen.); Evanilson 90'	Stadium: Estádio do FC Vizela; Referee: João Pinheiro

13 January 2022	Portimonense (1)	2–4	(2) Mafra	Portimão
20:45	Nakajima 31'; Boa Morte 90+1'	Report	Martins 4'; Ferreira 16' (pen.); Pedro Lucas 36'; Bura 71' (pen.)	Stadium: Estádio Municipal de Portimão; Referee: Hélder Malheiro

== Semi-finals ==
Number of teams per tier entering this round
Primeira Liga (1)	Liga Portugal 2 (2)	Liga 3 (3)	Campeonato de Portugal (4)	District Championships (5)	Total
3 / 18	1 / 16	0 / 21	0 / 58	0 / 41	4 / 154

Times were WET (UTC±0) in the first leg and WEST (UTC+1) in the second leg.

2 March 2022
20:45

Sporting CP (1)	1–2	(1) Porto
Sarabia 49'	Report	Taremi 59' (pen.); Evanilson 64'

Estádio José Alvalade, Lisbon
Attendance: 44,231
Referee: Artur Soares Dias
21 April 2022
20:15

Porto (1)	1–0	(1) Sporting CP
Martínez 83'	Report

Estádio do Dragão, Porto
Referee: Nuno Almeida

Porto won 3–1 on aggregate.

3 March 2022
20:15

Tondela (1)	3–0	(2) Mafra
Dantas 38'; Hernando 66'; Borges 75'	Report

Estádio João Cardoso, Tondela
Referee: Vitor Ferreira
20 April 2022
20:15

Mafra (2)	1–1	(1) Tondela
Pacheco 45'	Report	Boselli 89'

Estádio Municipal de Mafra, Mafra
Referee: Manuel Oliveira

Tondela won 4–1 on aggregate.

== Final ==
22 May 2022
17:15 WEST

Porto	3–1	Tondela
Taremi 22' (pen.), 74'; Vitinha 52'	Report	Borges 73'

Estádio Nacional, Oeiras
Referee: Rui Costa

== Bracket ==
Fifth round
22 December 2021
Leça (p)	1 (6)
Paredes	1 (5)
22 December 2021
Casa Pia	1
Sporting CP	2
23 December 2021
Vizela	1
Braga	0
23 December 2021
Porto	3
Benfica	0
23 December 2021
Rio Ave (p)	1 (6)
Belenenses SAD	1 (5)
21 December 2021
Tondela	3
Estoril	1
21 December 2021
Famalicão	1 (2)
Portimonense (p)	1 (4)
23 December 2021
Mafra	3
Moreirense	1

Quarter-finals
11 January 2022
Leça	0
Sporting CP	4
12 January 2022
Vizela	1
Porto	3
12 January 2022
Rio Ave	0
Tondela (a.e.t.)	1
13 January 2022
Portimonense	2
Mafra	4

Semi-finals
2 March/21 April 2022
Sporting CP	1	0	1
Porto	2	1	3
3 March/20 April 2022
Tondela	3	1	4
Mafra	0	1	1

Final
22 May 2022
Porto	3
Tondela	1
