= 2021–22 FC Porto season =

FC Porto
2021–22 season
- President: Jorge Nuno Pinto da Costa
- Head coach: Sérgio Conceição
- Stadium: Estádio do Dragão
- Primeira Liga: 1st
- Taça de Portugal: Winners
- Taça da Liga: Third round
- UEFA Champions League: Group stage
- UEFA Europa League: Round of 16
- Top goalscorer: League: Mehdi Taremi (20); All: Mehdi Taremi (26)
Home colours	Away colours	Third colours

The 2021–22 season was the 128th season in the existence of FC Porto and the club's 88th consecutive season in the top flight of Portuguese football. In addition to the domestic league, Porto participated in this season's editions of the Taça de Portugal, the Taça da Liga, the UEFA Champions League and the UEFA Europa League.

== Kits ==
Home	Away	Away alt.	Third

== Players ==
=== First-team squad ===
N	Pos.	Nat.	Name	Age	EU	Since	App	Goals	Ends	Transfer fee	Notes
1	GK	(Argentina)	Agustín Marchesín	33	Non-EU	2019	94	0	2023	€7.5M	
2	DF	(Portugal)	Fábio Cardoso	27	EU	2021	21	0	2026	€2.2M	
3	DF	(Portugal)	Pepe (captain)	38	EU	2019	220	14	2023	Free	Second spell at the club after 2004-2007
5	DF	(Spain)	Iván Marcano	34	EU	2019	207	21	2023	€3M	Second spell at the club after 2014-2018
7	FW	(Colombia)	Luis Díaz	24	Non-EU	2019	125	41	2024	€7M	
8	MF	(Colombia)	Mateus Uribe	30	Non-EU	2019	125	10	2023	€9M	
9	FW	(Iran)	Mehdi Taremi	29	Non-EU	2020	96	49	2024	Undisclosed	
10	FW	(Portugal)	Francisco Conceição	18	EU	2021	50	3	2023	Youth system	
11	FW	(Brazil)	Pepê	24	Non-EU	2021	42	6	2021	€15M	
12	DF	(Nigeria)	Zaidu Sanusi	24	Non-EU	2020	81	5	2025	Undisclosed	
13	FW	(Brazil)	Galeno	23	Non-EU	2022	22	2	2026	€9M	Second spell at the club after 2017-2019
14	GK	(Portugal)	Cláudio Ramos	29	EU	2020	2	0	2024	Free	
16	MF	(Serbia)	Marko Grujić	25	Non-EU	2020	75	3	2021	Undisclosed	
18	DF	(Portugal)	Wilson Manafá	27	EU	2019	120	2	2023	Undisclosed	
19	DF	(Democratic Republic of the Congo)	Chancel Mbemba	27	Non-EU	2018	138	9	2022	€4.5M	
20	MF	(Portugal)	Vitinha	21	EU	2019	47	4	2024	Youth system	
22	DF	(Brazil)	Wendell	28	Non-EU	2021	27	1	2025	€4M	
23	MF	(Portugal)	João Mário	21	EU	2020	62	2	2025	Youth system	
25	MF	(Brazil)	Otávio	26	Non-EU	2014	239	24	2021	€2.5M	
28	MF	(Portugal)	Bruno Costa	24	EU	2021	34	0	2024	Undisclosed	Second spell at the club after 2017-2020
29	FW	(Spain)	Toni Martínez	24	EU	2020	64	15	2025	Undisclosed	
30	FW	(Brazil)	Evanilson	20	Non-EU	2020	70	25	2025	Undisclosed	
46	DF	(Canada)	Stephen Eustáquio	23	Non-EU	2022	11	0	2022	Undisclosed	Loaned from Paços de Ferreira
50	MF	(Portugal)	Fábio Vieira	20	EU	2020	76	10	2022	Youth system	
71	GK	(Portugal)	Francisco Meixedo	20	EU	2021	1	0	2024	Youth system	
99	GK	(Portugal)	Diogo Costa	21	EU	2018	25	0	2022	Youth system	

- Source: FC Porto
- Ordered by squad number.

=== Out on loan ===
Note: Flags indicate national team as defined under FIFA eligibility rules; some limited exceptions apply. Players may hold more than one non-FIFA nationality.

No.	Pos.	Nation	Player
—	DF	POR	Diogo Leite (at Braga until 30 June 2022)
—	DF	BRA	João Pedro (at Corinthians until 30 June 2022)
—	MF	POR	Carraça (at Belenenses SAD until 30 June 2022)
—	MF	SEN	Mamadou Loum (at Alavés until 30 June 2022)
—	MF	POR	Sérgio Oliveira (at Roma until 30 June 2022)

No.	Pos.	Nation	Player
—	MF	POR	Romário Baró (at Estoril until 30 June 2022)
—	MF	JPN	Shoya Nakajima (at Portimonense until 30 June 2022)
—	FW	POR	Rodrigo Conceição (at Moreirense until 30 June 2022)
—	FW	BRA	Fernando Andrade (at Al-Fayha until 30 June 2022)

=== Transfers ===
==== In ====
Date	Pos.	Name	Nationality	Age	Transferred from	Window	Until	Fee	Ref.
1 July 2021	DF	Fábio Cardoso	Portugal	27	Santa Clara (Portugal)	Summer	2026	€2.2M	
1 July 2021	FW	Pepê	Brazil	24	Grêmio (Brazil)	Summer	2026	€15M	
6 July 2021	MF	Bruno Costa	Portugal	24	Portimonense (Portugal)	Summer	2024	€2.5M	
20 July 2021	MF	Marko Grujić	Serbia	25	Liverpool (England)	Summer	2026	€9M	
19 August 2021	DF	Wendell	Brazil	28	Bayer Leverkusen (Germany)	Summer	2025	€4M	
31 January 2022	FW	Galeno	Brazil	24	Braga (Portugal)	Winter	2026	€9M	

==== Out ====
Date	Pos.	Name	Nationality	Age	Transferred to	Window	Fee	Ref.
1 July 2021	DF	Chidozie Awaziem	Nigeria	24	Boavista (Portugal)	Summer	€5M	
1 July 2021	MF	Danilo Pereira	Portugal	29	Paris Saint-Germain (France)	Summer	€16M	
1 July 2021	FW	Moussa Marega	Mali	30	Al Hilal (Saudi Arabia)	Summer	Free	
28 August 2021	MF	Ewerton	Brazil	28	Portimonense (Portugal)	Summer	Free	
14 January 2022	FW	Jesús Corona	Mexico	29	Sevilla (Spain)	Winter	€3M	
30 January 2022	FW	Luis Díaz	Colombia	25	Liverpool (England)	Winter	€45M	

==== Loan in ====
Date	Pos.	Name	Nationality	Age	Loaned from	Window	Until	Ref.
24 January 2022	MF	Stephen Eustáquio	Canada	25	Paços de Ferreira (Portugal)	Winter	30 June 2022	
31 January 2022	DF	Rúben Semedo	Portugal	27	Olympiacos (Greece)	Winter	30 June 2022	

==== Loan return ====
Date	Pos.	Name	Nationality	Age	Returned from	Window
20 July 2022	MF	Vitinha	Portugal	21	Wolverhampton Wanderers (England)	Summer
31 December 2021	DF	Renzo Saravia	Argentina	28	Internacional (Brazil)	Winter

==== Loan out ====
Date	Pos.	Name	Nationality	Age	Loaned to	Window	Until	Ref.
23 July 2021	MF	Mamadou Loum	Senegal	24	Alavés (Spain)	Summer	30 June 2022	
7 August 2021	FW	Fernando Andrade	Brazil	28	Al-Fayha (Saudi Arabia)	Summer	1 July 2022	
24 August 2021	MF	Carraça	Portugal	28	Belenenses (Portugal)	Summer	30 June 2022	
26 August 2021	FW	Shoya Nakajima	Japan	27	Portimonense (Portugal)	Summer	30 June 2022	
31 August 2021	MF	Romário Baró	Portugal	21	Estoril (Portugal)	Summer	30 June 2022	
31 August 2021	DF	Diogo Leite	Portugal	22	Braga (Portugal)	Summer	30 June 2022	
10 January 2022	FW	Nanu	Guinea-Bissau	27	FC Dallas (United States)	Winter	1 January 2023	
13 January 2022	MF	Sérgio Oliveira	Portugal	29	Roma (Italy)	Winter	30 June 2022	

== Technical staff ==
Position	Staff
Head coach	(Portugal) Sérgio Conceição
Assistant coaches	(Portugal) Vítor Bruno
Assistant coaches	(France) Siramana Dembélé
Goalkeeper coaches	(Portugal) Diamantino Figueiredo (Croatia) Vedran Runje
Exercise Physiologist	(Portugal) Eduardo Oliveira
Fitness coach	(Portugal) Telmo Sousa

Last updated: 2 July 2021
Source: FC Porto

== Pre-season and friendlies ==
Win Draw Loss Fixtures

17 July 2021 Friendly	Porto	3–2	Académico de Viseu	Faro, Portugal
11:30 WEST (UTC+1)				Stadium: Vila Real de Santo António

20 July 2021 Friendly	Porto	Cancelled	Anadia	Vila Nova de Gaia, Portugal
12:00 WEST (UTC+1)				Stadium: CTFD PortoGaia

25 July 2021 Friendly	Porto	2–0	Lille	Faro, Portugal
19:45 WEST (UTC+1)	Costa 53'; Manafá (yellow card) 72'; Fernando 78', (yellow card) 90'	Report	Djaló (yellow card) 16'; Yılmaz (yellow card) 44'; Sanches (yellow card) 48'; Weah (yellow card) 76'	Stadium: Estádio Algarve; Attendance: 0

28 July 2021 Friendly	Porto	1–1	Roma	Setúbal, Portugal
20:00 WEST (UTC+1)	B. Costa (yellow card) 69'; Vitinha 89'	Report	Mancini 56'; Mkhitaryan (yellow card) 69'	Stadium: Estádio Municipal da Bela Vista; Attendance: 0 Referee: Rui Soares

31 July 2021 Friendly	Porto	5–3	Lyon	Porto, Portugal
17:30 WEST (UTC+1)	Oliveira 4' (pen.); Vieira 30'; Sanusi (yellow card) 45'; Pepe 79'; Martínez 83', (yellow card) 89'; Taremi 84'	Report	Keïta (yellow card) 34'; Marcelo 40'; Toko Ekambi 54'; Slimani 81'	Stadium: Estádio do Dragão; Referee: Vitor Ferreira

== Competitions ==
=== Overall record ===
Competition	First match	Last match	Starting round	Final position	Record							
Competition	First match	Last match	Starting round	Final position	Pld	W	D	L	GF	GA	GD	Win %
Primeira Liga	8 August 2021	14 May 2022	Matchday 1	Winners	34	29	4	1	86	22	+64	85.29
Taça de Portugal	15 October 2021	22 May 2022	Third round	Winners	7	7	0	0	22	4	+18	100.00
Taça da Liga	26 October 2021	15 December 2021	Third round	Third round	2	1	0	1	2	3	−1	50.00
UEFA Champions League	15 September 2021	7 December 2021	Group stage	Group stage	6	1	2	3	4	11	−7	16.67
UEFA Europa League	17 February 2022	17 March 2022	Knockout round play-offs	Round of 16	4	1	2	1	5	5	+0	25.00
Total					53	39	8	6	119	45	+74	73.58

Last updated: 22 May 2022
Source: Soccerway

=== Primeira Liga ===
==== League table ====
Pos	Team	Pld	W	D	L	GF	GA	GD	Pts	Qualification or relegation
1	Porto (C)	34	29	4	1	86	22	+64	91	Qualification for the Champions League group stage
2	Sporting CP	34	27	4	3	73	23	+50	85	Qualification for the Champions League group stage
3	Benfica	34	23	5	6	78	30	+48	74	Qualification for the Champions League third qualifying round
4	Braga	34	19	8	7	52	31	+21	65	Qualification for the Europa League group stage (Note: Since the winners of the 2021–22 Taça de Portugal, Porto, qualified for the Champions League based on league position, the spot awarded to the fourth-placed team (Europa Conference League third qualifying round) was passed to the fifth-placed team, and the spot awarded to the fifth-placed team (Europa Conference League second qualifying round) was passed to the sixth-placed team.)
5	Gil Vicente	34	13	12	9	47	42	+5	51	Qualification for the Europa Conference League third qualifying round

Source: Liga Portugal
Rules for classification: 1) Points; 2) Head-to-head points; 3) Head-to-head goal difference; 4) Head-to-head away goals scored; 5) Goal difference; 6) Matches won; 7) Goals scored; 8) Play-off.
(C) Champions

==== Results summary ====
Overall								Home						Away					
Pld	W	D	L	GF	GA	GD	Pts	W	D	L	GF	GA	GD	W	D	L	GF	GA	GD
34	29	4	1	86	22	+64	91	15	2	0	50	11	+39	14	2	1	36	11	+25

Last updated: 14 May 2022.
Source: Liga Portugal

==== Results by round ====
Round	1	2	3	4	5	6	7	8	9	10	11	12	13	14	15	16	17	18	19	20	21	22	23	24	25	26	27	28	29	30	31	32	33	34
Ground	H	A	A	H	A	H	A	H	A	H	A	H	A	H	A	H	A	A	H	H	A	H	A	H	A	H	A	H	A	H	A	H	A	H
Result	W	W	D	W	D	W	W	W	W	W	W	W	W	W	W	W	W	W	W	W	W	D	W	D	W	W	W	W	W	W	L	W	W	W
Position	6	4	4	2	3	2	2	2	2	1	1	1	1	1	1	1	1	1	1	1	1	1	1	1	1	1	1	1	1	1	1	1	1	1

Updated to match(es) played on 14 May 2022. Source: Liga Portugal
A = Away; H = Home; W = Win; D = Draw; L = Loss

==== Matches ====
8 August 2021 1	Porto	2–0	Belenenses SAD	Porto
18:00 WEST (UTC+1)	Martínez 19'; Oliveira (yellow card) 26'; Díaz (yellow card) 53', (goal) 65'	Report	Boni (yellow card) 36'; Calila (yellow card) 47'; Teixeira (yellow card) 83'	Stadium: Estádio do Dragão; Attendance: 15,429; Referee: Gustavo Correia

15 August 2021 2	Famalicão	1–2	Porto	Vila Nova de Famalicão
18:00 WEST (UTC+1)	Riccieli 55'	Report	Martínez 13', 43'	Stadium: Estádio Municipal 22 de Junho; Attendance: 1,388; Referee: Nuno Almeida

22 August 2021 3	Marítimo	1–1	Porto	Funchal
18:00 WEST (UTC+1)	Xadas 45+4'	Report	Díaz 35'	Stadium: Estádio do Marítimo; Attendance: 3,591; Referee: João Pinheiro

28 August 2021 4	Porto	3–0	Arouca	Porto
18:00 WEST (UTC+1)	Uribe 24'; Taremi 34'; Marcano 63'	Report		Stadium: Estádio do Dragão; Attendance: 12,588; Referee: Hélder Malheiro

11 September 2021 5	Sporting CP	1–1	Porto	Lisbon
20:30 WEST (UTC+1)	Santos 16'	Report	Díaz 71'	Stadium: Estádio José Alvalade; Attendance: 18,723; Referee: Nuno Almeida

19 September 2021 6	Porto	5–0	Moreirense	Porto
18:00 WEST (UTC+1)	Taremi 33', 71'; Díaz 51', 65'; Pepê 78'	Report		Stadium: Estádio do Dragão; Attendance: 14,009; Referee: António Nobre

24 September 2021 7	Gil Vicente	1–2	Porto	Barcelos
21:15 WEST (UTC+1)	Lino 24'	Report	Taremi 9'; Oliveira 89'	Stadium: Estádio Cidade de Barcelos; Attendance: 5,258; Referee: Artur Soares Dias

2 October 2021 8	Porto	2–1	Paços de Ferreira	Porto
18:00 WEST (UTC+1)	Díaz 44'; Wendell 52'	Report	Santos 19'	Stadium: Estádio do Dragão; Attendance: 22,507; Referee: Manuel Mota

23 October 2021 9	Tondela	1–3	Porto	Tondela
18:00 WEST (UTC+1)	Borges 4'	Report	Taremi 19', 43', 79'	Stadium: Estádio João Cardoso; Attendance: 2,898; Referee: Fábio Veríssimo

30 October 2021 10	Porto	4–1	Boavista	Porto
17:00 WEST (UTC+1)	Díaz 21'; Evanilson 41', 47'; Loader 90+6'	Report	Hamache 30'	Stadium: Estádio do Dragão; Attendance: 31,207; Referee: Tiago Martins

7 November 2021 11	Santa Clara	0–3	Porto	Ponta Delgada
17:00 WET (UTC±0)		Report	Oliveira 42'; Díaz 46', 77'	Stadium: Estádio de São Miguel; Attendance: 3,745; Referee: Rui Costa

28 November 2021 12	Porto	2–1	Vitória de Guimarães	Porto
20:30 WET (UTC±0)	Díaz 39'; Evanilson 60'	Report	Edwards 36' (pen.)	Stadium: Estádio do Dragão; Attendance: 26,407; Referee: Luis Godinho

3 December 2021 13	Portimonense	0–3	Porto	Portimão
19:00 WET (UTC±0)		Report	Pedro Sá 45+3' (o.g.); Vitinha 70'; Otávio 75'	Stadium: Estádio Municipal de Portimão; Referee: Manuel Oliveira

12 December 2021 14	Porto	1–0	Braga	Porto
20:30 WET (UTC±0)	Díaz 22'	Report		Stadium: Estádio do Dragão; Attendance: 22,307; Referee: António Nobre

19 December 2021 15	Vizela	0–4	Porto	Vizela
19:00 WET (UTC±0)		Report	Luis Díaz 14'; Otávio 19'; Zaidu 47'; Samu 64' (pen.)	Stadium: Estádio do FC Vizela; Attendance: 4,970; Referee: Hélder Malheiro

30 December 2021 16	Porto	3–1	Benfica	Porto
21:00 WET (UTC±0)	Vieira 34'; Pepê 37'; Taremi 69'	Report	Yaremchuk 46'	Stadium: Estádio do Dragão; Attendance: 46,250; Referee: Hugo Miguel

8 January 2022 17	Estoril	2–3	Porto	Estoril
18:00 WET (UTC±0)	Arthur 38'; Franco 42'	Report	Taremi 49'; Luis Díaz 84'; Conceição 90'	Stadium: Estádio António Coimbra da Mota; Attendance: 2,876; Referee: António Nobre

16 January 2022 18	Belenenses SAD	1–4	Porto	Oeiras
20:30 WET (UTC±0)	Camará 13'	Report	Evanilson 36', 58', 84'; Taremi 61'; Luis Díaz (penalty missed) 79'	Stadium: Estádio Nacional; Attendance: 6,992; Referee: Manuel Mota

23 January 2022 19	Porto	3–1	Famalicão	Porto
20:30 WET (UTC±0)	Otávio 25'; Luis Díaz 37'; Taremi 78' (pen.)	Report	Riccieli 90+1'	Stadium: Estádio do Dragão; Attendance: 23,725; Referee: Rui Costa

30 January 2022 20	Porto	2–1	Marítimo	Porto
20:30 WET (UTC±0)	Evanilson 19'; Pepe 49'	Report	Costa 53'	Stadium: Estádio do Dragão; Attendance: 22,630; Referee: Fábio Melo

6 February 2022 21	Arouca	0–2	Porto	Arouca
18:00 WET (UTC±0)		Report	Vitinha 54'; Mbemba 57'	Stadium: Estádio Municipal de Arouca; Attendance: 3,753; Referee: Hélder Malheiro

11 February 2022 22	Porto	2–2	Sporting CP	Porto
20:15 WET (UTC±0)	Vieira 38'; Taremi 78'	Report	Paulinho 8'; Santos 34'	Stadium: Estádio do Dragão; Attendance: 48,350; Referee: João Pinheiro

20 February 2022 23	Moreirense	0–1	Porto	Moreira de Cónegos
20:00 WET (UTC±0)		Report	Evanilson 40'	Stadium: Parque Joaquim de Almeida Freitas; Attendance: 3,688; Referee: Luís Godinho

27 February 2022 24	Porto	1–1	Gil Vicente	Porto
20:30 WET (UTC±0)	Evanilson 66'	Report	Navarro 62'	Stadium: Estádio do Dragão; Attendance: 38,430; Referee: Manuel Mota

6 March 2022 25	Paços de Ferreira	2–4	Porto	Paços de Ferreira
18:00 WET (UTC±0)	Delgado 31'; Gaitán 66'	Report	Pepe 17'; Evanilson 38', 53'; Taremi 59'	Stadium: Estádio da Mata Real; Attendance: 6,869; Referee: João Pinheiro

13 March 2022 26	Porto	4–0	Tondela	Porto
18:00 WET (UTC±0)	Taremi 45' (pen.); Galeno 73'; Vieira 76'; Conceição 79'	Report		Stadium: Estádio do Dragão; Attendance: 32,609; Referee: Gustavo Correia

20 March 2022 27	Boavista	0–1	Porto	Porto
20:45 WET (UTC±0)		Report	Vieira 32'; Evanilson (penalty missed) 62'	Stadium: Estádio do Bessa; Attendance: 11,251; Referee: Artur Soares Dias

4 April 2022 28	Porto	3–0	Santa Clara	Porto
20:15 WEST (UTC+1)	Vieira 38', 41'; Sanusi 84'	Report		Stadium: Estádio do Dragão; Attendance: 30,250; Referee: António Nobre

10 April 2022 29	Vitória de Guimarães	0–1	Porto	Guimarães
18:00 WEST (UTC+1)		Report	Taremi 36' (pen.), (penalty missed) 62'	Stadium: Estádio D. Afonso Henriques; Attendance: 19,232; Referee: João Pinheiro

16 April 2022 30	Porto	7–0	Portimonense	Porto
20:30 WEST (UTC+1)	Taremi 19', 34' (pen.), 47'; Grujić 28'; Evanilson 40', 60'; Pepe 55'	Report		Stadium: Estádio do Dragão; Attendance: 48,109; Referee: Tiago Martins

25 April 2022 31	Braga	1–0	Porto	Braga
18:00 WEST (UTC+1)	R. Horta 54'	Report		Stadium: Estádio Municipal de Braga; Attendance: 17,665; Referee: Hugo Miguel

30 April 2022 32	Porto	4–2	Vizela	Porto
19:00 WEST (UTC+1)	Evanilson 21'; Taremi 28' (pen.), 87'; Mbemba 57'	Report	Mendez 36'; Moreira 49'	Stadium: Estádio do Dragão; Attendance: 46,830; Referee: Manuel Mota

7 May 2022 33	Benfica	0–1	Porto	Lisbon
18:00 WEST (UTC+1)		Report	Sanusi 90+4'	Stadium: Estádio da Luz; Attendance: 42,256; Referee: Luís Godinho

14 May 2022 34	Porto	2–0	Estoril	Porto
18:00 WEST (UTC+1)	Joãozinho 48' (o.g.); Fernando 88'	Report		Stadium: Estádio do Dragão; Referee: António Nobre

=== Taça de Portugal ===
15 October 2021 Third round	Sintrense	0–5	Porto	Sintra
18:45 WEST (UTC+1)		Report	Oliveira 17', 27'; Evanilson 55', 69'; Martínez 76'	Stadium: Estádio do Sport União Sintrense; Referee: André Narciso

20 November 2021 Fourth round	Porto	5–1	Feirense	Porto
21:15 WET (UTC±0)	Uribe 15'; Otávio 39', 45'; Evanilson 57'; Conceição 72' (pen.)	Report	Vargas 67'	Stadium: Estádio do Dragão; Referee: Hugo Miguel

23 December 2021 Fifth round	Porto	3–0	Benfica	Porto
20:45 WET (UTC±0)	Evanilson 1', 31'; Vitinha 7'	Report		Stadium: Estádio do Dragão; Referee: Fábio Veríssimo

12 January 2022 Quarter-finals	Vizela	1–3	Porto	Vizela
20:45 WET (UTC±0)	Cassiano 24'	Report	Uribe 8'; Vieira 64' (pen.); Evanilson 89'	Stadium: Estádio do FC Vizela; Referee: João Pinheiro

2 March 2022 Semi-finals; First leg	Sporting CP	1–2	Porto	Lisbon
20:45 WET (UTC+0)	Sarabia 49'	Report	Taremi 59' (pen.); Evanilson 64'	Stadium: Estádio José Alvalade; Attendance: 44,231; Referee: Artur Soares Dias

21 April 2022 Semi-finals; Second leg	Porto	1–0 (3–1 agg.)	Sporting CP	Porto
20:15 WEST (UTC+1)	Martínez 83'	Report		Stadium: Estádio do Dragão; Referee: Nuno Almeida

22 May 2022 Final	Porto	3–1	Tondela	Oeiras
17:15 WEST (UTC+1)	Taremi 22' (pen.), 74', (penalty missed) 66'; Vitinha 52'	Report	Borges 73'	Stadium: Estádio Nacional; Referee: Rui Costa

=== Taça da Liga ===
==== Third round ====
Pos	Team	Pld	W	D	L	GF	GA	GD	Pts	Qualification	STA	POR	RAV
1	Santa Clara	2	1	1	0	5	3	+2	4	Advance to knockout phase	—	3–1	—
2	Porto	2	1	0	1	2	3	−1	3		—	—	1–0
3	Rio Ave	2	0	1	1	2	3	−1	1		2–2	—	—

Updated to match(es) played on 15 December 2021. Source: Liga Portugal
Rules for classification: Tiebreakers

26 October 2021 2	Santa Clara	3–1	Porto	Ponta Delgada
18:00 WEST (UTC+1)	Chindriș 17'; Ricardinho 65'; Nené 90+6'	Report	Taremi 83'	Stadium: Estádio de São Miguel; Attendance: 1,739; Referee: Manuel Oliveira

15 December 2021 3	Porto	1–0	Rio Ave	Porto
21:00 WET (UTC±0)	Pepê 83'	Report		Stadium: Estádio do Dragão; Attendance: 4,433; Referee: Miguel Nogueira

=== UEFA Champions League ===
==== Group stage ====
The draw for the group stage was held on 26 August 2021.

Pos	Team	Pld	W	D	L	GF	GA	GD	Pts	Qualification	LIV	ATM	POR	MIL
1	(England) Liverpool	6	6	0	0	17	6	+11	18	Advance to knockout phase	—	2–0	2–0	3–2
2	(Spain) Atlético Madrid	6	2	1	3	7	8	−1	7	Advance to knockout phase	2–3	—	0–0	0–1
3	(Portugal) Porto	6	1	2	3	4	11	−7	5	Transfer to Europa League	1–5	1–3	—	1–0
4	(Italy) Milan	6	1	1	4	6	9	−3	4		1–2	1–2	1–1	—

Source: UEFA
Rules for classification: Group stage tiebreakers

15 September 2021 1	Atlético Madrid (Spain)	0–0	(Portugal) Porto	Madrid, Spain
21:00 CEST (UTC+2)	Félix (yellow card) 51'; Kondogbia (yellow card) 52'; Felipe (yellow card) 71'	Report	Díaz (yellow card) 16'; Sanusi (yellow card) 21'; Uribe (yellow card) 41'; Vitinha (yellow card) 67'; Corona (yellow card) 76'; Wendell (yellow card) 83'; Mbemba (red card) 90+5'	Stadium: Wanda Metropolitano; Attendance: 40,098; Referee: Ovidiu Hațegan (Romania)

28 September 2021 2	Porto (Portugal)	1–5	(England) Liverpool	Porto, Portugal
20:00 WEST (UTC+1)	Taremi 75'	Report	Salah 18', 60'; Mané 45'; Firmino 77', 81'	Stadium: Estádio do Dragão; Attendance: 23,520; Referee: Sergei Karasev (Russia)

19 October 2021 3	Porto (Portugal)	1–0	(Italy) Milan	Porto, Portugal
20:00 WEST (UTC+1)	Oliveira (yellow card) 3'; Uribe (yellow card) 38'; Díaz 65'	Report	Tomori (yellow card) 16'; Giroud (yellow card) 20'; Kalulu (yellow card) 81'; Ibrahimović (yellow card) 87'; Leão (yellow card) 90'	Stadium: Estádio do Dragão; Attendance: 32,130; Referee: Felix Brych (Germany)

3 November 2021 4	Milan (Italy)	1–1	(Portugal) Porto	Milan, Italy
18:45 CET (UTC+1)	Tomori (yellow card) 55'; Mbemba 61' (o.g.)	Report	Díaz 6'; Grujić (yellow card) 49'; Mbemba (yellow card) 65'; Vitinha (yellow card) 73'; Conceição (yellow card) 90+2'	Stadium: San Siro; Attendance: 39,675; Referee: Clément Turpin (France)

24 November 2021 5	Liverpool (England)	2–0	(Portugal) Porto	Liverpool, England
20:00 GMT (UTC±0)	Konaté (yellow card) 29'; Thiago 52'; Salah 70'; Milner (yellow card) 88'	Report	Uribe (yellow card) 40'; Mbemba (yellow card) 75'	Stadium: Anfield; Attendance: 52,209; Referee: Felix Zwayer (Germany)

7 December 2021 6	Porto (Portugal)	1–3	(Spain) Atlético Madrid	Porto, Portugal
20:00 WET (UTC±0)	Taremi (yellow card) 32'; Otávio (yellow card) 67'; Pepe (yellow card) 69'; Wendell (red card) 70'; Marchesín (red card) 75'; Oliveira 90+6' (pen.)	Report	Griezmann 56'; Carrasco (red card) 67'; Correa (yellow card) 67', (goal) 90'; De Paul 90+2'	Stadium: Estádio do Dragão; Attendance: 38,830; Referee: Clément Turpin (France)

=== UEFA Europa League ===
==== Knockout phase ====
===== Knockout round play-offs =====
The draw for the knockout round play-offs was held on 13 December 2021.

17 February 2022 First leg	Porto (Portugal)	2–1	(Italy) Lazio	Porto, Portugal
21:00 CET (UTC+1)	Grujić (yellow card) 4'; Martínez 37', 49'; Vieira (yellow card) 45+1'; Galeno (yellow card) 72'; Evanilson (yellow card) 73'	Report	Zaccagni 23', (yellow card) 78'; Milinković-Savić (yellow card) 39'	Stadium: Estádio do Dragão; Attendance: 32,929; Referee: Serdar Gözübüyük (Netherlands)

24 February 2022 Second leg	Lazio (Italy)	2–2 (3–4 agg.)	(Portugal) Porto	Rome, Italy
18:45 CET (UTC+1)	Radu (yellow card) 4'; Immobile 19'; Patric (yellow card) 77'; Luis Alberto (yellow card) 78'; Cataldi 90+5'	Report	Taremi 31' (pen.); Sanusi (yellow card) 45+2'; Uribe 68'; Otávio (yellow card) 79'	Stadium: Stadio Olimpico; Attendance: 24,948; Referee: Deniz Aytekin (Germany)

===== Round of 16 =====
The draw for the round of 16 was held on 25 February 2022.

9 March 2022 First leg	Porto (Portugal)	0–1	(France) Lyon	Porto, Portugal
18:45 CET (UTC+1)	Otávio (yellow card) 74'; Conceição (yellow card) 90+6'	Report	Paquetá 59'; Dubois (yellow card) 64'	Stadium: Estádio do Dragão; Attendance: 26,309; Referee: José María Sánchez Martínez (Spain)

17 March 2022 Second leg	Lyon (France)	1–1 (2–1 agg.)	(Portugal) Porto	Décines-Charpieu, France
21:00 CET (UTC+1)	Dembélé 13'; Dubois (yellow card) 60'; Caqueret (yellow card) 83'	Report	Eustáquio (yellow card) 18'; Pepê 27'; Evanilson (yellow card) 82'	Stadium: Groupama Stadium; Attendance: 54,551; Referee: Ovidiu Hațegan (Romania)

== Statistics ==
=== Appearances and goals ===
As of 22 May 2022

No.	Pos	Nat	Player	Total		Primeira Liga		Taça de Portugal		Taça da Liga		Champions League		Europa League	
No.	Pos	Nat	Player	Apps	Goals	Apps	Goals	Apps	Goals	Apps	Goals	Apps	Goals	Apps	Goals
Goalkeepers
1	GK	(Argentina) ARG	Agustín Marchesín	9	0	0+1	0	7	0	1	0	0	0	0	0
14	GK	(Portugal) POR	Cláudio Ramos	2	0	1	0	0	0	1	0	0	0	0	0
71	GK	(Portugal) POR	Francisco Meixedo	1	0	0+1	0	0	0	0	0	0	0	0	0
99	GK	(Portugal) POR	Diogo Costa	43	0	33	0	0	0	0	0	6	0	4	0
Defenders
2	DF	(Portugal) POR	Fábio Cardoso	21	0	11+3	0	4+1	0	0	0	1+1	0	0	0
3	DF	(Portugal) POR	Pepe	34	1	21	1	3+1	0	0	0	5	0	4	0
5	DF	(Spain) ESP	Iván Marcano	12	1	8	1	1	0	1	0	1+1	0	0	0
12	DF	(Nigeria) NGR	Zaidu Sanusi	40	3	20+4	3	5+1	0	0	0	5+1	0	4	0
18	DF	(Portugal) POR	Wilson Manafá	10	0	2+4	0	2	0	2	0	0	0	0	0
19	DF	(Democratic Republic of the Congo) COD	Chancel Mbemba	47	2	31	2	6	0	1	0	5	0	4	0
22	DF	(Brazil) BRA	Wendell	27	1	10+9	1	2+2	0	0	0	1+3	0	0	0
35	DF	(Portugal) POR	Rúben Semedo	2	0	0+1	0	0	0	0	0	0	0	0+1	0
43	DF	(Brazil) BRA	João Marcelo	2	0	0	0	0+1	0	1	0	0	0	0	0
55	DF	(Portugal) POR	João Mendes	2	0	0+1	0	0	0	0+1	0	0	0	0	0
97	DF	(Portugal) POR	Zé Pedro	1	0	0	0	0	0	1	0	0	0	0	0
Midfielders
8	MF	(Colombia) COL	Mateus Uribe	38	4	23+2	1	4+1	2	0	0	4	0	3+1	1
16	MF	(Serbia) SRB	Marko Grujić	30	1	10+11	1	3+2	0	1	0	0	0	2+1	0
20	MF	(Portugal) POR	Vitinha	47	4	27+3	2	6+1	2	0	0	1+5	0	2+2	0
25	MF	(Portugal) POR	Otávio	49	5	32	3	6+1	2	0+1	0	6	0	3	0
28	MF	(Portugal) POR	Bruno Costa	21	0	9+3	0	2+1	0	2	0	0+1	0	2+1	0
46	DF	(Canada) CAN	Stephen Eustáquio	11	0	1+7	0	0+1	0	0	0	0	0	1+1	0
50	MF	(Portugal) POR	Fábio Vieira	39	7	15+12	6	2+3	1	2	0	0+2	0	2+1	0
87	MF	(Portugal) POR	Bernardo Folha	1	0	0	0	0	0	0+1	0	0	0	0	0
Forwards
9	FW	(Iran) IRI	Mehdi Taremi	48	26	27+5	20	6	3	0+1	1	6	1	2+1	1
10	FW	(Portugal) POR	Francisco Conceição	33	4	1+24	2	2+2	1	1	1	0+2	0	0+1	0
11	FW	(Brazil) BRA	Pepê	41	5	15+13	4	2+2	0	1+1	0	0+3	0	4	1
13	FW	(Brazil) BRA	Galeno	18	1	0+12	1	0+2	0	0	0	0	0	1+3	0
23	FW	(Portugal) POR	João Mário	39	0	24+4	0	2+1	0	0	0	4	0	2+2	0
29	FW	(Spain) ESP	Toni Martínez	37	7	4+15	3	0+6	2	2	0	2+4	0	3+1	2
30	FW	(Brazil) BRA	Evanilson	46	21	25+5	14	7	7	0+1	0	4	0	1+3	0
38	FW	(Brazil) BRA	Fernando Andrade	1	1	0+1	1	0	0	0	0	0	0	0	0
42	FW	(Cameroon) CMR	Danny Loader	2	1	0+1	1	0	0	0+1	0	0	0	0	0
70	FW	(Portugal) POR	Gonçalo Borges	2	0	0+1	0	0	0	0+1	0	0	0	0	0
Players who made an appearance and/or had a squad number but left the team.
31	DF	(Guinea-Bissau) GBS	Nanu	2	0	0	0	0	0	2	0	0	0	0	0
17	MF	(Mexico) MEX	Jesús Corona	18	0	3+8	0	1	0	2	0	2+2	0	0	0
27	MF	(Portugal) POR	Sérgio Oliveira	24	5	3+10	2	1+2	2	1+1	0	4+2	1	0	0
7	FW	(Colombia) COL	Luis Díaz	28	16	18	14	2+1	0	0+1	0	6	2	0	0
