= Mendeira =

Village in Cernache de Bonjardim, Portugal

Coordinates: 39°47′28″N 08°15′29″E

Mendeira is a village in the Portuguese parish of Cernache de Bonjardim, with less than twenty inhabitants. The village is near Mount Mendeira and the Zêzere River. The Dutch painter Els Smulders-Waijers have a studio in the village.
