= Cernache do Bonjardim, Nesperal e Palhais =

- Civil parish
- Location in Portugal
- Coordinates: 39.818°N 8.186°W
- Country: Portugal
- Region: Oeste e Vale do Tejo
- Intermunic. comm.: Médio Tejo
- District: Castelo Branco
- Municipality: Sertã

Area
  - Total: 135.39 km^{2} (52.27 sq mi)

Population (2011)
  - Total: 3,625
  - Density: 26.77/km^{2} (69.35/sq mi)
- Time zone: UTC+00:00 (WET)
  - Summer (DST): UTC+01:00 (WEST)
- Website: https://www.jf-cernachebonjardim.pt/

Cernache do Bonjardim, Nesperal e Palhais is a civil parish in the municipality of Sertã, Portugal. It was formed in 2013 by the merger of the former parishes of Cernache do Bonjardim, Nesperal and Palhais. The population in 2011 was 3,625, in an area of 101.59 square kilometres (39.22 sq mi).
