= A Comarca da Sertã =

Local newspaper published weekly in Sertã, Portugal

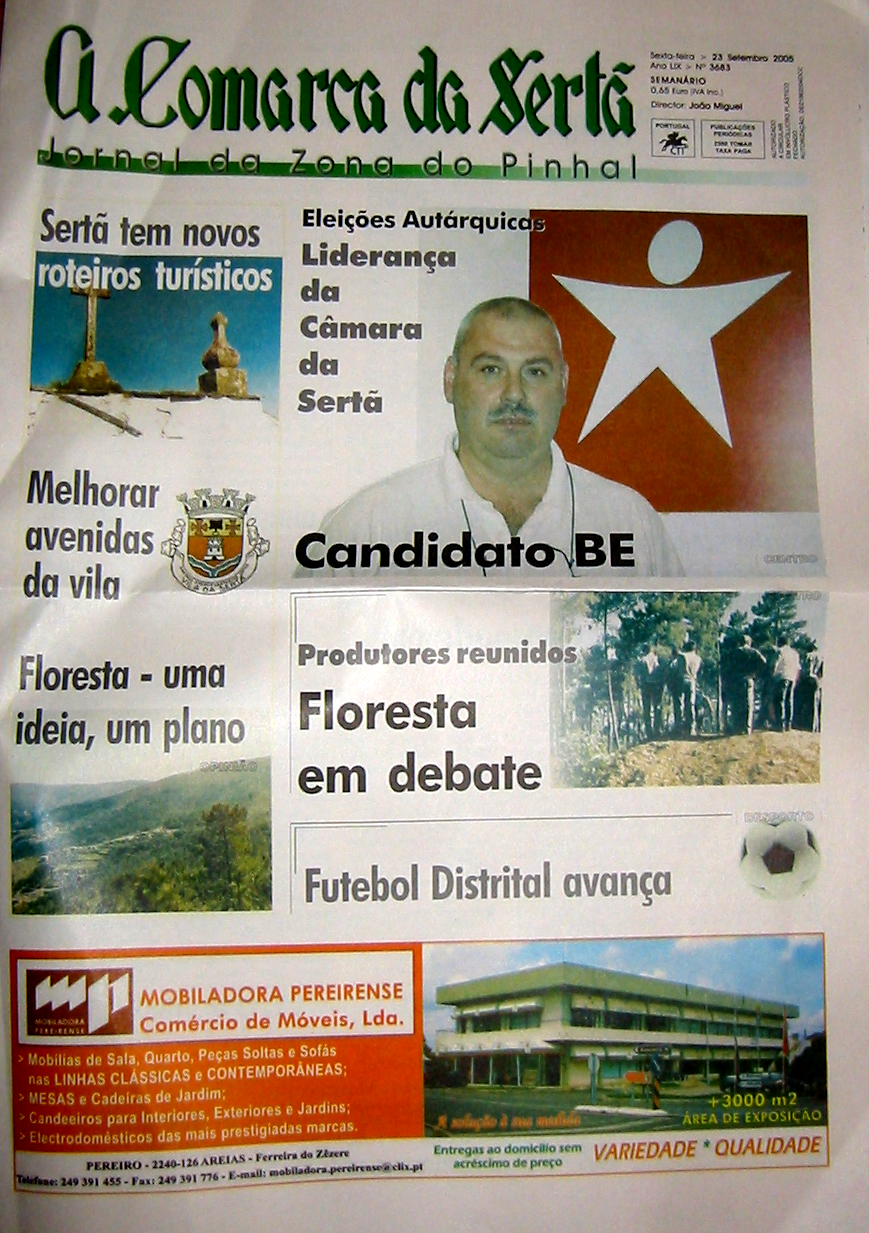
A Comarca da Sertã's cover page

A Comarca da Sertã is a local newspaper published weekly in Sertã, Portugal.

It was first published on 9 May 1936, edited by Eduardo Barata da Silva Corrêa. Later it was developed by Amaro Vicente Martins. Since 2005 it is edited by João Miguel Barata Martins.

The newspaper is owned by Verde Press - Edições, Lda.
