= Fábio Vieira (footballer, born 2000) =

Portuguese footballer (born 2000)

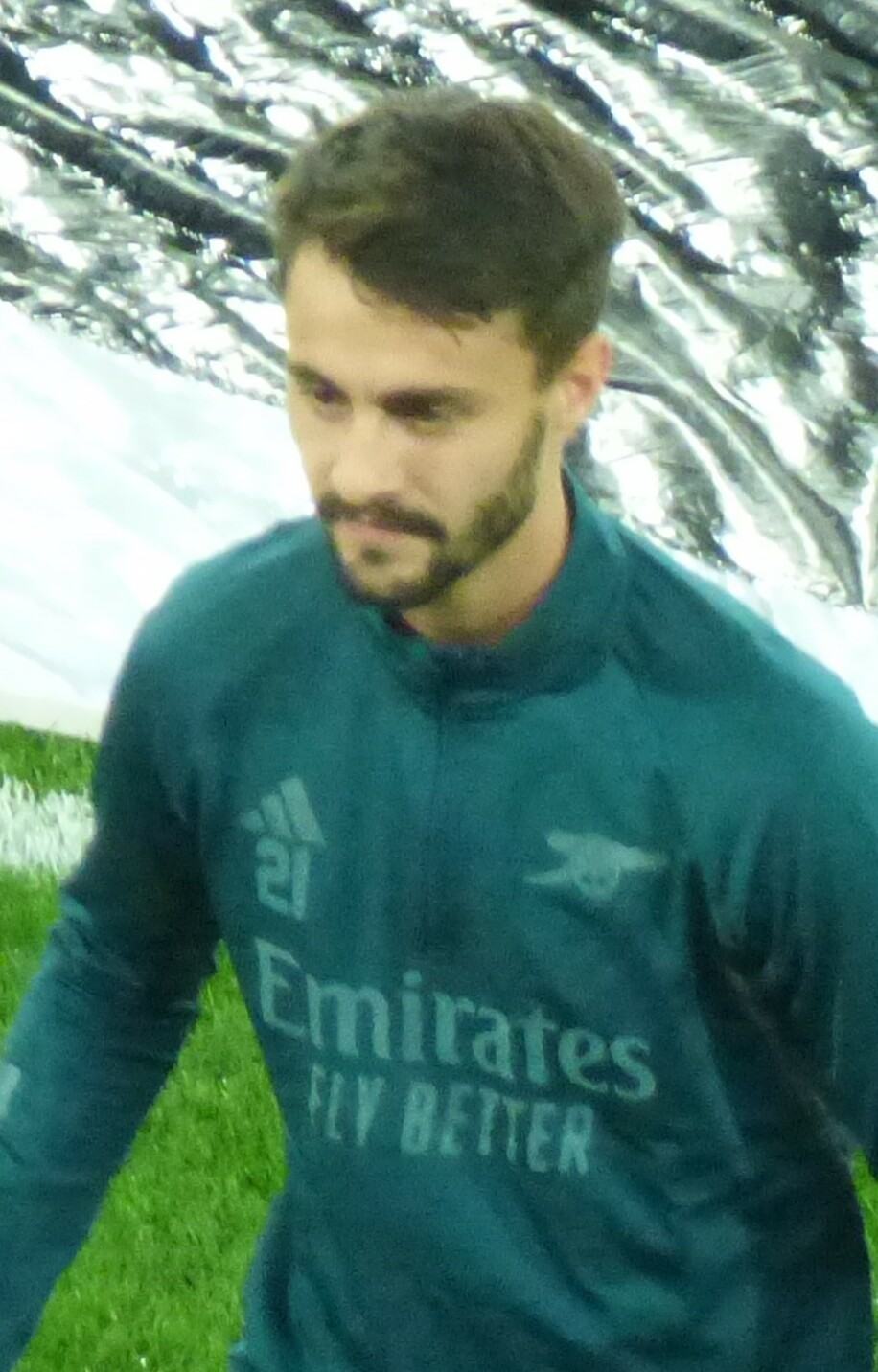
- Vieira with Arsenal in 2023

Personal information
- Full name: Fábio Daniel Ferreira Vieira
- Date of birth: 30 May 2000 (age 26)
- Place of birth: Santa Maria da Feira, Portugal
- Height: 1.73 m (5 ft 8 in)
- Position: Attacking midfielder

Team information
- Current team: Hamburger SV
- Number: 20

Youth career
- 2008–2019: Porto
- 2015–2016: → Padroense (loan)

Senior career*
Years	Team	Apps	(Gls)
2019–2021	Porto B	28	(9)
2020–2022	Porto	54	(8)
2022–2026	Arsenal	33	(2)
2024–2025	→ Porto (loan)	26	(4)
2025–2026	→ Hamburger SV (loan)	29	(7)
2026–	Hamburger SV	6	(0)

International career
2018	Portugal U18	2	(0)
2019	Portugal U19	9	(1)
2019–2020	Portugal U20	4	(2)
2019–2023	Portugal U21	25	(14)
Medal record
Men's football
Representing Portugal
UEFA European Under-21 Championship
Runner-up	2021 Hungary–Slovenia
UEFA European Under-19 Championship
Runner-up	2019 Armenia
- * Club domestic league appearances and goals as of 17:30, 24 October 2026 (UTC)

Fábio Daniel Ferreira Vieira (Portuguese pronunciation: [ˈfaβiu viˈɐjɾɐ]; born 30 May 2000) is a Portuguese professional footballer who plays as an attacking midfielder for Bundesliga club Hamburger SV.

He started his career with Porto, where he made 76 competitive appearances and scored ten goals in his first spell, winning two Primeira Liga and the 2021–22 Taça de Portugal. In July 2022, he signed with Arsenal, returning to Porto on loan two years later.

Vieira represented Portugal at youth level. He finished runner-up at the 2021 European Championship with the under-21 team, being voted the tournament's best player.

== Club career ==
=== Porto ===
Born in Santa Maria da Feira, Aveiro District, Vieira played nine matches as Porto's juniors won the 2018–19 UEFA Youth League, and scored to open their 3–1 win against Chelsea in the final in Nyon on 29 April. On 24 October 2018, in a group game, he was sent off for two yellow cards in a 2–1 loss at Lokomotiv Moscow.

Vieira made his senior debut with Porto B on 24 February 2019, coming on as a 57th-minute substitute for João Mário in a 1–0 away defeat to Arouca in the LigaPro. Six months and a day later, he scored for the first time with a penalty in a 3–1 away victory over Farense.

Vieira played his first competitive match with the first team on 10 June 2020, featuring 19 minutes in the 1–0 Primeira Liga home defeat of Marítimo. Again from the bench, he scored his first goal in the competition on 5 July to help the hosts beat B-SAD 5–0, and totalled eight appearances at the end of the season for the eventual champions.

On 27 October 2020, in only his second appearance in the UEFA Champions League, Vieira netted in the 2–0 win against Olympiacos in the group stage after starting at the Estádio do Dragão. On 20 March 2022, his 32nd-minute strike decided the local derby at Boavista. He scored his first league brace two weeks later, his side's first and second goals in a 3–0 home win over Santa Clara.

Vieira found more space within the first team during the 2021–22 campaign, especially after impressing in the 2021 UEFA European Under-21 Championship where he was named player of the tournament, providing two hat-tricks of assists against Moreirense and B-SAD and totalling 14 – second-best in the league – and six goals to help his side to a domestic double of the league and Taça de Portugal.

=== Arsenal ===
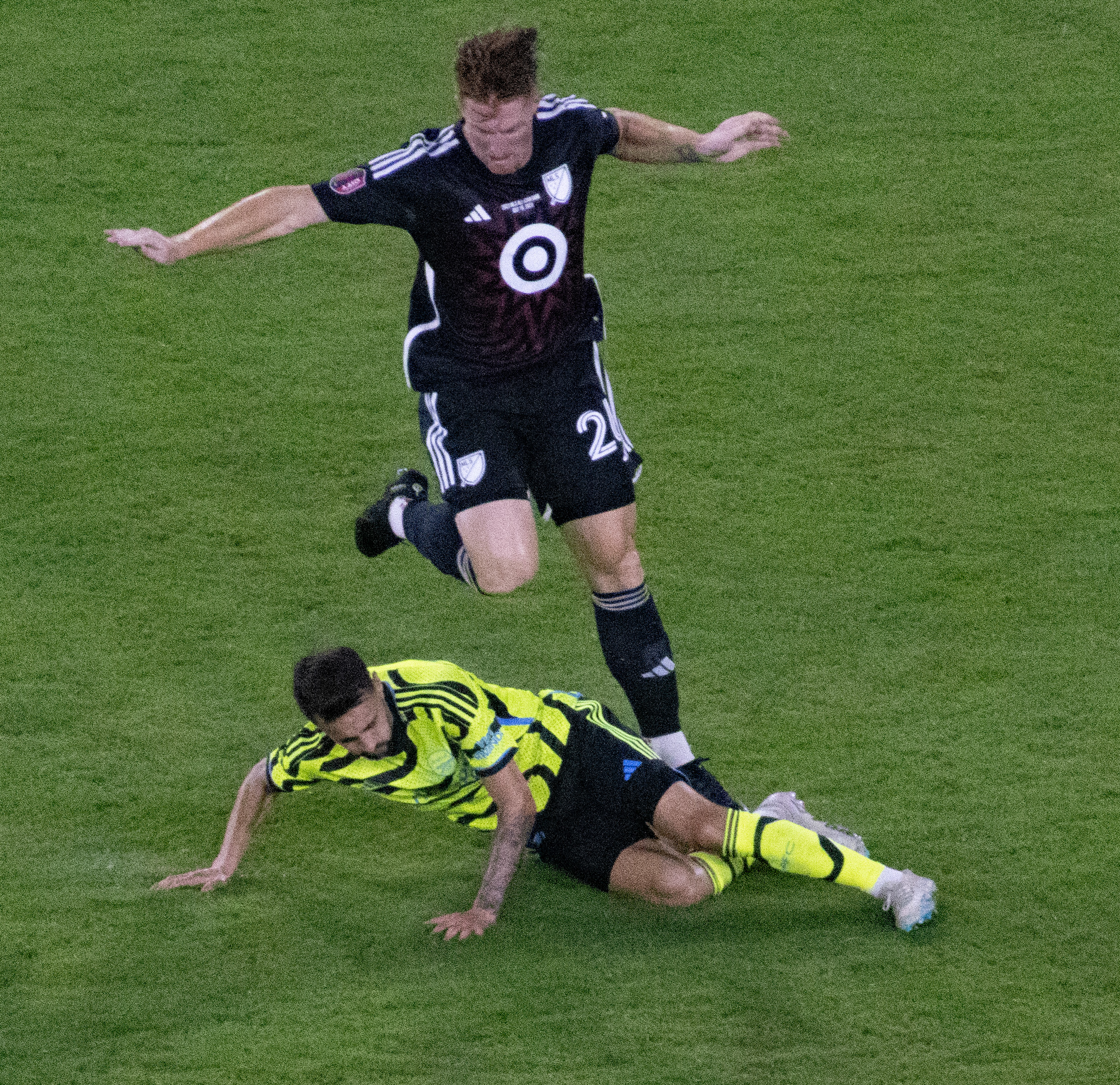
Vieira (bottom) playing for Arsenal in 2023 in a friendly against the MLS All-Stars

On 17 June 2022, Porto reached an agreement with Premier League club Arsenal for the transfer of Vieira for a fee of €35 million (£29.9 million) plus €5 million (£4.4 million) in add-ons. Four days later, a long-term contract was agreed. Having arrived injured, he made his league debut on 4 September, replacing Albert Sambi Lokonga in the 74th minute of the 3–1 loss at Manchester United. His first start occurred four days later in a 2–1 win over FC Zürich in the group stage of the UEFA Europa League, and he scored his first goal on 18 September to close a 3–0 domestic league victory at Brentford.

On 6 August 2023, Vieira scored the decisive penalty in the shoot-out as Arsenal beat Manchester City in the FA Community Shield following a 1–1 draw at Wembley Stadium. On 11 November, he was sent off with a straight red card following a dangerous challenge on Burnley's Josh Brownhill in a 3–1 home victory where he featured 24 minutes from the bench, then endured a lengthy spell on the sidelines due to a groin injury.

Vieira returned to Porto on 27 August 2024, on a season-long loan. He scored five goals from 42 appearances during his second spell, providing six assists. He participated with the team in the 2025 FIFA Club World Cup, where he assisted once and conceded a penalty in the 4–4 group-stage draw against Al Ahly.

=== Hamburger SV ===
On 1 September 2025, Vieira joined Hamburger SV, recently returned to the Bundesliga, on loan for the 2025–26 campaign. He was sent off twice in his first five league appearances; he bounced back, however, finishing with a squad-best seven goals and five assists in an easy escape from relegation.

Vieira agreed to a permanent four-year deal on 1 September 2026, for an undisclosed fee believed to be €10 million.

== International career ==
Vieira played all five matches as Portugal finished runners-up to Spain at the 2019 UEFA European Under-19 Championship in Armenia. In the group phase against the same team on 17 July, he earned a 1–1 draw with a free kick in Yerevan; he and teammate Félix Correia were named in the Team of the Tournament.

On 14 November 2019, Vieira won his first cap for the under-21 side, being booked in the 0–0 friendly home draw with Slovenia. Five days later, he scored once and provided one assist in a 3–2 victory in Norway in the 2021 UEFA European Championship qualifiers. He was voted best player of the finals in Hungary and Slovenia, featuring in all six games and netting once for the runners-up.

In October 2022, Vieira was named in a preliminary 55-man squad for the 2022 FIFA World Cup in Qatar. Having scored seven goals during qualification, he missed the 2023 European Under-21 Championship due to injury.

== Personal life ==
In June 2023, Vieira announced he was expecting his first child with his partner Carina Raquel. Their son was born in October that year.

== Career statistics ==
As of match played 24 October 2026

Appearances and goals by club, season and competition
Club	Season	League			National cup (Note: Includes Taça de Portugal, FA Cup, DFB-Pokal)		League cup (Note: Includes Taça da Liga, EFL Cup)		Europe		Other		Total	
Club	Season	Division	Apps	Goals	Apps	Goals	Apps	Goals	Apps	Goals	Apps	Goals	Apps	Goals
Porto B	2019–20	LigaPro	23	7	—		—		—		—		23	7
Porto B	2020–21	Liga Portugal 2	4	2	—		—		—		—		4	2
Porto B	Total		27	9	—		—		—		—		27	9
Porto	2019–20	Primeira Liga	8	2	—		—		—		—		8	2
Porto	2020–21	Primeira Liga	19	0	3	0	1	0	6 (Note: Appearances in UEFA Champions League)	1	—		29	1
Porto	2021–22	Primeira Liga	27	6	5	1	2	0	5 (Note: Two appearances in UEFA Champions League, three appearances in UEFA Europa League)	0	—		39	7
Porto	Total		54	8	8	1	3	0	11	1	—		76	10
Arsenal	2022–23	Premier League	22	1	2	0	1	0	8 (Note: Appearances in UEFA Europa League)	1	—		33	2
Arsenal	2023–24	Premier League	11	1	0	0	1	0	3	0	1 (Note: Appearance in FA Community Shield)	0	16	1
Arsenal	2024–25	Premier League	0	0	—		—		—		—		0	0
Arsenal	2025–26	Premier League	0	0	—		—		—		—		0	0
Arsenal	2026–27	Premier League	0	0	—		—		—		0	0	0	0
Arsenal	Total		33	2	2	0	2	0	11	1	1	0	49	3
Arsenal U21	2023–24	—			—		—		—		1 (Note: Appearance in EFL Trophy)	1	1	1
Porto (loan)	2024–25	Primeira Liga	26	4	2	0	2	0	9	1	3 (Note: Appearances in FIFA Club World Cup)	0	42	5
Hamburger SV (loan)	2025–26	Bundesliga	29	7	2	0	—		—		—		31	7
Hamburger SV	2026–27	Bundesliga	6	0	0	0	—		—		—		6	0
Career total			175	30	14	1	7	0	31	3	5	1	232	35

== Honours ==
Porto Youth

- UEFA Youth League: 2018–19

Porto

- Primeira Liga: 2019–20, 2021–22
- Taça de Portugal: 2021–22

Arsenal

- FA Community Shield: 2023

Portugal U19

- UEFA European Under-19 Championship runner-up: 2019

Portugal U21

- UEFA European Under-21 Championship runner-up: 2021

Individual

- Primeira Liga Midfielder of the Month: April 2022
- SJPF Young Player of the Month: January 2022
- UEFA European Under-19 Championship Team of the Tournament: 2019
- UEFA European Under-21 Championship Team of the Tournament: 2021
- UEFA European Under-21 Championship Player of the Tournament: 2021
