= Berço SC =

Portuguese sports club

- Full name: Berço Sport Clube
- Founded: 18 July 2016; 8 years ago
- Ground: Academia Berço, Guimarães
- Capacity: 1,500
- League: Campeonato de Portugal
- 2020–21: 6th, Serie C

Berço Sport Clube is a Portuguese sports club from Guimarães.

The men's football team plays in the Campeonato de Portugal, the fourth tier of Portuguese football.

== History ==
The team started out in the AF Braga Honra Série B in 2017–18, but was promoted to the third tier by 2019. In 2021, the Campeonato de Portugal dropped from being the third to the fourth tier.
