= Sertã (parish) =

- Civil parish
- Location in Portugal
- Coordinates: 39.808°N 8.098°W
- Country: Portugal
- Region: Oeste e Vale do Tejo
- Intermunic. comm.: Médio Tejo
- District: Castelo Branco
- Municipality: Sertã

Area
  - Total: 80.85 km^{2} (31.22 sq mi)

Population (2011)
  - Total: 6,196
  - Density: 77/km^{2} (200/sq mi)
- Time zone: UTC+00:00 (WET)
  - Summer (DST): UTC+01:00 (WEST)
- Website: www.jfserta.pt

Sertã is a civil parish in the municipality of Sertã, Portugal. The population in 2011 was 6,196, in an area of 80.95 km^{2}. The parish includes the following villages:

- Aldeia da Ribeira Cimeira
- Aldeia da Ribeira Fundeira
- Amial
- Amioso
- Calvos
- Capitólio
- Chão da Forca
- Codiceira
- Herdade
- Maxial or Maxial da Estrada
- Maxial da Carreira
- Maxialinho
- Moinho da Rola
- Outeiro da Lagoa
- Pombas
- São João do Couto
- Senhora dos Remédios
- Serra do Pinheiro
- Sertã
- Vale de Água
- Vale da Cortiçada or Corkiçada Valley
- Vale Porco
- Venda da Pedra
- Venestal
- Verdelhos
- Vilar da Carga
