= Cernache do Bonjardim =

Coordinates: 39°48′58″N 8°11′13″W

Cernache do Bonjardim is a former civil parish in the municipality of Sertã, central Portugal. In 2013, the parish merged into the new parish Cernache do Bonjardim, Nesperal e Palhais. The population in 2011 was 3,052, in an area of 71.59 km^{2}.

The Portuguese hero Nuno Álvares Pereira was born in Cernache do Bonjardim on 24 June 1360.

The parish includes the following villages:

- Brejo da Correia
- Calvaria
- Carvalhos
- Cernache do Bonjardim
- Escudeiros
- Matos
- Mendeira
- Pampilhal
- Pinheiro da Aldeia Velha
- Porto dos Fusos
- Quintã
- Roda
- Sambado
- Várzea de Pedro Mouro
