= Sertã =

- Municipality
- Town of Sertã
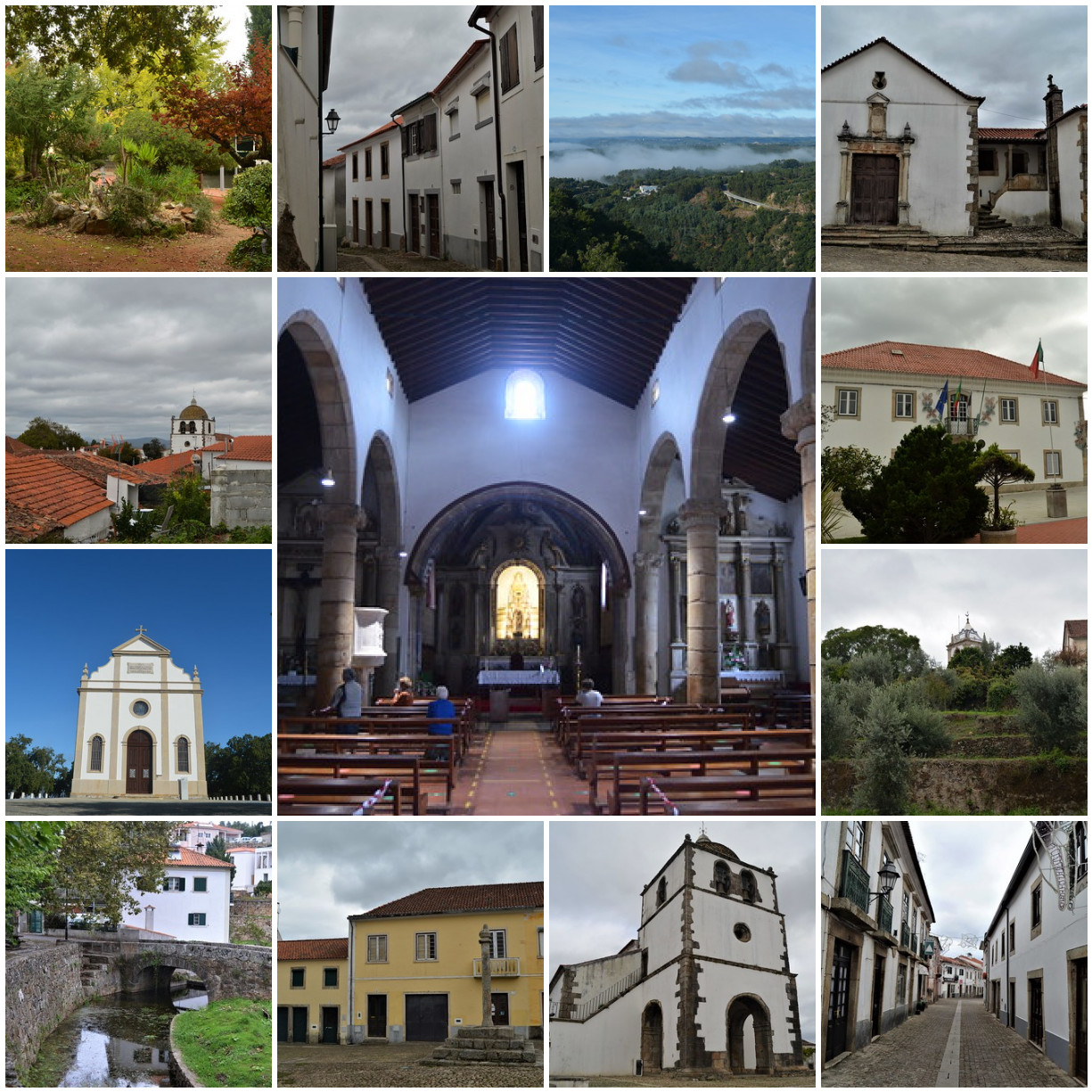

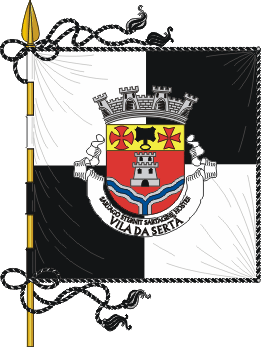
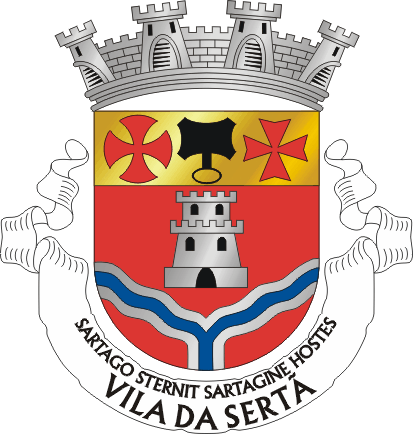
- Flag Coat of arms
- Interactive map of Sertã
- Coordinates: 39.80°N 8.10°W
- Country: Portugal
- Region: Oeste e Vale do Tejo
- Intermunic. comm.: Médio Tejo
- District: Castelo Branco
- Parishes: 10

Government
  - President: Carlos Miranda (PS)

Area
  - Total: 446.73 km^{2} (172.48 sq mi)
- Elevation: 250 m (820 ft)

Population (2011)
  - Total: 15,880
  - Density: 35.55/km^{2} (92.07/sq mi)
- Time zone: UTC+00:00 (WET)
  - Summer (DST): UTC+01:00 (WEST)
- Postal code: 6100
- Area code: (+351) 274
- Local holiday: Birthday of Nuno Álvares Pereira, 24 June
- Website: Official website (in Portuguese)

Sertã (Portuguese pronunciation: [sɨɾˈtɐ̃]), officially Town of Sertã (Portuguese: Vila da Sertã), is a municipality in Castelo Branco District in Portugal. The population in 2011 was 15,880, in an area of 446.73 km^{2}.

The present mayor is Carlos Miranda, elected by the PS. The municipal holiday is the June 24.

Population of Sertã (1801 – 2011)
1801	1849	1900	1930	1960	1981	1991	2001	2011
10235	13456	20380	24057	27997	21503	18199	16720	15880

== Etymology ==
The town's name literally means "frying pan", but is near-certainly a phono-semantic matching of a pre-Roman toponym. This hasn't stopped the creation of all manner of folk etymological legends seeking to explain name of the town, the most famous of which is the so-called "Legend of Celinda", supposedly a Lusitanian woman who had been frying eggs while the settlement was under attack by Quintus Sertorius' forces and, upon learning of her husband's death, poured boiling hot cooking oil on the besiegers. This story has lent the town its name Sartago Sternit Sartagine Hostes (lit. 'Sertã scatters its enemies with a sertã').

== General information ==
Local sports club: Sertanense Futebol Clube (mainly devoted to soccer, playing (2004-2005) the 3rd Division Championship).

Local newspaper: A Comarca da Sertã (weekly)

== Parishes ==
Administratively, the municipality is divided into 10 civil parishes (freguesias):

Parish name	Population (2011)	Area km^{2}
Cabeçudo	957	10.39
Carvalhal	465	10.02
Castelo	1,046	24.57
Cernache do Bonjardim, Nesperal e Palhais	3,625	101.58
Cumeada e Marmeleiro	731	51.73
Ermida e Figueiredo	423	42.74
Pedrógão Pequeno	753	36.86
Sertã	6,196	80.95
Troviscal	864	53.37
Várzea dos Cavaleiros	820	34.51

== Notable people ==
- Nuno Álvares Pereira (born 1360 in Cernache de Bonjardim - 1431) a Portuguese general, he became a mystic and was beatified by Pope Benedict XV, in 1918, and canonised by Pope Benedict XVI in 2009
- João Castel-Branco Goulão (born 1954 in Cernache do Bonjardim) a physician and the current national drug coordinator for Portugal
