= 2020–21 C.D. Santa Clara season =

Santa Clara
2020–21 season
- President: Rui Miguel Melo Cordeiro
- Manager: Daniel Ramos
- Stadium: Estádio de São Miguel
- Primeira Liga: 6th
- Taça de Portugal: Quarter-finals
Home colours	Away colours	Third colours

The 2020–21 season was the 100th season in the existence of C.D. Santa Clara and the club's third consecutive season in the top-flight of Portuguese football. In addition to the domestic league, Santa Clara participated in this season's edition of the Taça de Portugal.

== Players ==
=== First-team squad ===
As of 3 February 2021

Note: Flags indicate national team as defined under FIFA eligibility rules; some limited exceptions apply. Players may hold more than one non-FIFA nationality.

No.	Pos.	Nation	Player
1	GK	POR	André Ferreira
2	DF	POR	Rafael Ramos
3	DF	VEN	Mikel Villanueva
4	DF	POR	Fábio Cardoso
5	DF	POR	João Afonso
6	DF	BRA	Mansur
7	FW	BRA	Allano
10	MF	BRA	Lincoln
11	FW	URU	Gustavo Viera
13	FW	BRA	Carlos
15	DF	POR	João Lucas
17	FW	POR	Ukra
18	MF	POR	Rúben Oliveira
19	MF	BRA	Júlio Romão
20	MF	POR	Costinha

No.	Pos.	Nation	Player
21	MF	POR	Nené
23	FW	BRA	Crysan
25	MF	JPN	Hidemasa Morita
26	FW	BRA	Jean Patric
27	MF	BRA	Anderson Carvalho
31	DF	URU	Cristian González
33	MF	BRA	Lucas Marques
35	FW	POR	Diogo Salomão
70	FW	IRI	Shahriyar Moghanlou
95	DF	SEN	Pierre Sagna
97	GK	POR	Rodolfo Cardoso
99	GK	POR	Marco Pereira
—	DF	BRA	Patrick Vieira
—	FW	POR	Rui Costa

== Pre-season and friendlies ==
Win Draw Loss Fixtures

== Competitions ==
=== Overview ===
Competition	First match	Last match	Starting round	Final position	Record							
Competition	First match	Last match	Starting round	Final position	Pld	W	D	L	GF	GA	GD	Win %
Primeira Liga	18 September 2020	19 May 2021	Matchday 1	6th	34	13	7	14	44	36	+8	38.24
Taça de Portugal	22 November 2020	29 January 2021	Third round	Quarter-finals	4	3	0	1	7	4	+3	75.00
Total					38	16	7	15	51	40	+11	42.11

Source: Soccerway

=== Primeira Liga ===
==== League table ====
Pos	Team	Pld	W	D	L	GF	GA	GD	Pts	Qualification or relegation
4	Braga	34	19	7	8	53	33	+20	64	Qualification for the Europa League group stage (Note: Braga qualified for the Europa League group stage by winning the 2020–21 Taça de Portugal. Since they would have qualified for the Europa Conference League third qualifying round by finishing fourth, the berth was awarded to the fifth-placed team (Paços de Ferreira), and the Europa Conference League second qualifying round berth reserved to the fifth-placed team was awarded to the sixth-placed team (Santa Clara).)
5	Paços de Ferreira	34	15	8	11	40	41	−1	53	Qualification for the Europa Conference League third qualifying round
6	Santa Clara	34	13	7	14	44	36	+8	46	Qualification for the Europa Conference League second qualifying round
7	Vitória de Guimarães	34	12	7	15	37	44	−7	43 (Note: Vitória de Guimarães are ranked ahead of Moreirense on head-to-head points: Vitória de Guimarães 4, Moreirense 1.)	
8	Moreirense	34	10	13	11	37	43	−6	43	

Source: Liga Portugal
Rules for classification: 1) Points; 2) Head-to-head points; 3) Head-to-head goal difference; 4) Head-to-head away goals scored; 5) Goal difference; 6) Matches won; 7) Goals scored; 8) Play-off.

==== Results summary ====
Overall								Home						Away					
Pld	W	D	L	GF	GA	GD	Pts	W	D	L	GF	GA	GD	W	D	L	GF	GA	GD
34	13	7	14	44	36	+8	46	7	5	5	26	16	+10	6	2	9	18	20	−2

Source: Liga Portugal

==== Results by round ====
Round	1	2	3	4	5	6	7	8	9	10	11	12	13	14	15	16	17	18	19	20	21	22	23	24	25	26	27	28	29	30	31	32	33	34
Ground	H	A	H	A	H	A	A	H	A	H	A	H	A	H	A	H	A	A	H	A	H	A	H	H	A	H	A	H	A	H	A	H	A	H
Result	W	W	D	L	L	W	L	L	W	L	L	D	D	L	W	W	D	W	L	L	W	L	W	D	L	W	L	D	L	D	L	W	W	W
Position	5	4	3	4	6	5	9	8	7	7	7	7	7	11	8	7	7	7	8	8	7	8	7	8	7	6	7	7	8	7	8	8	7	6

Source: Liga Portugal
A = Away; H = Home; W = Win; D = Draw; L = Loss

==== Matches ====
The league fixtures were announced on 28 August 2020.

20 September 2020 1	Santa Clara	2–0	Marítimo	Ponta Delgada
15:00 WEST (UTC+1)	Thiago Santana 57', 72', (yellow card) 84'; Nené (yellow card) 90+6'	Report	Correa (yellow card) 47'	Stadium: Estádio de São Miguel; Attendance: 0 (Note: The match was played behind closed doors due to the COVID-19 pandemic in Portugal.); Referee: Manuel Mota

25 September 2020 2	Braga	0–1	Santa Clara	Braga
20:30 WEST (UTC+1)		Report	Thiago Santana 5'	Stadium: Estádio Municipal de Braga; Attendance: 0 Referee: Rui Costa

3 October 2020 3	Santa Clara	0–0	Gil Vicente	Ponta Delgada
15:00 WEST (UTC+1)	Villanueva (yellow card) 4'	Report	Leandrinho (yellow card) 21'; Perreira (yellow card) 65'; Rodrigão (yellow card) 80'	Stadium: Estádio de São Miguel; Attendance: 0 Referee: Iancu Vasilica

18 October 2020 4	Paços de Ferreira	2–1	Santa Clara	Paços de Ferreira
15:00 WEST (UTC+1)	Reabciuk 34', (yellow card) 68'; Douglas 71'; Diaby (yellow card) 83'	Report	F. Cardoso (yellow card) 50'; Santana 68', (yellow card) 79'	Stadium: Estádio da Mata Real; Attendance: 0 Referee: Vítor Ferreira

24 October 2020 5	Santa Clara	1–2	Sporting CP	Ponta Delgada
19:00 WEST (UTC+1)	González (yellow card) 18'; Thiago Santana 42'; Sagna (yellow card) 45'; Carvalho (yellow card) 63'	Report	Gonçalves 20', 81'; Coates (yellow card) 90+3'	Stadium: Estádio de São Miguel; Attendance: 932; Referee: Manuel Mota

1 November 2020 6	Portimonense	1–2	Santa Clara	Portimão
15:00 WEST (UTC+1)	Anzai (yellow card) 41'; Lucas Fernandes (yellow card) 59'; Boa Morte 66', (yellow card) 84'	Report	Carlos (yellow card) 6'; Rashid (yellow card) 18'; Nené (yellow card) 31'; F. Cardoso 37', (yellow card) 51'; Thiago Santana 57'; Jean Patric (yellow card) 82'; Marco (yellow card) 90+4'	Stadium: Estádio Municipal de Portimão; Attendance: 0 Referee: Fábio Veríssimo

7 November 2020 7	Tondela	2–0	Santa Clara	Tondela
15:00 WET (UTC±0)	Agra 35'; González 67'	Report		Stadium: Estádio João Cardoso; Attendance: 0 Referee: João Bento

28 November 2020 8	Santa Clara	0–1	Porto	Ponta Delgada
17:00 WET (UTC±0)	Rashid (yellow card) 33'; Costinha (yellow card) 37'	Report	Grujić (yellow card) 35'; Díaz 45+1'	Stadium: Estádio de São Miguel; Attendance: 0 Referee: João Pinheiro

6 December 2020 9	Nacional	1–3	Santa Clara	Funchal
15:00 WEST (UTC+1)	Pedrão (yellow card) 32'; Gorré 38', (yellow card) 63'; Micael (yellow card) 72'	Report	Carlos 22'; Rashid 34'; Ramos (yellow card) 48'; Costinha (yellow card) 70'; Thiago Santana 85'	Stadium: Estádio da Madeira; Attendance: 0 Referee: Vítor Ferreira

21 December 2020 10	Santa Clara	0–4	Vitória de Guimarães	Ponta Delgada
19:45 WET (UTC±0)	Villanueva (yellow card) 56'	Report	André André 6'; Quaresma 27'; Estupiñán 30', 54'	Stadium: Estádio de São Miguel; Attendance: 0 Referee: Rui Costa

29 December 2020 11	Moreirense	1–0	Santa Clara	Guimarães
18:45 WET (UTC±0)	F. Soares (yellow card) 11'; Yan 72'	Report	Moghanlou (yellow card) 34'; Anderson Carvalho (yellow card) 55'; Villanueva (yellow card) 81'; F. Cardoso (yellow card) 85'; Costinha (yellow card) 88'	Stadium: Parque de Jogos Comendador Joaquim de Almeida Freitas; Attendance: 0 Referee: Iancu Vasilica

4 January 2021 12	Santa Clara	1–1	Benfica	Ponta Delgada
16:00 WET (UTC±0)	Sagna (yellow card) 26'; Cardoso 59', (yellow card) 77'; Rashid (yellow card) 90+5'	Report	Ferro (yellow card) 29'; Núñez 32'	Stadium: Estádio de São Miguel; Attendance: 0 Referee: Hélder Malheiro

9 January 2021 13	Boavista	1–1	Santa Clara	Porto
20:30 WET (UTC±0)	Nuno Santos 20'; Cannon (yellow card) 49'; Paulinho (yellow card) 71'; Rafael Bracalli (yellow card) 71'	Report	João Afonso (yellow card) 26'; Carlos 37'; Anderson Carvalho (yellow card) 43'; Diogo Salomão (yellow card) 71'; Nené (yellow card) 87'	Stadium: Estádio do Bessa; Attendance: 0 Referee: António Emanuel Carvalho Nobre

17 January 2021 14	Santa Clara	1–2	Famalicão	Ponta Delgada, Azores
16:30 WET (UTC±0)	Lucas (yellow card) 26'; Carvalho (yellow card) 41'; Ramos (yellow card) 63'; Queirós 70' (o.g.); Carlos (yellow card) 71'; Costinha (yellow card) 76'	Report	Jhonata Robert 51'; Jaime (yellow card) 53'; William (yellow card) 72'; Luković 83'; Vinagre (yellow card) 85'; Rodrigues (yellow card) 86'	Stadium: Estádio de São Miguel; Attendance: 0 Referee: Fábio Melo

25 January 2021 15	Rio Ave	1–2	Santa Clara	Vila do Conde
16:30 WET (UTC±0)	Meshino 26'; Borevković (yellow card) 35'; Filipe Augusto (yellow card) 57'; Gabrielzinho (yellow card) 60'; Ronan (yellow card) 78'; Silva (yellow card) 80'; Pinto (yellow card) 87'	Report	Carlos 23'; João Lucas (yellow card) 67'; Morita 89'	Stadium: Estádio dos Arcos; Attendance: 0 Referee: Miguel Nogueira

1 February 2021 16	Santa Clara	2–0	Belenenses SAD	Ponta Delgada
16:00 WEST (UTC+1)	Crysan 13'; Mansur (yellow card) 47'; Allano (yellow card) 74'; Marco (yellow card) 86'; Diogo Calila 90+4' (o.g.)	Report	Henriques (yellow card) 34'; Sousa (yellow card) 89'	Stadium: Estádio de São Miguel; Attendance: 0 Referee: Hugo Silva

4 February 2021 17	Farense	1–1	Santa Clara	Faro
15:00 WET (UTC±0)	Gauld 40'	Report	Ramos (yellow card) 42'; Carlos 63', (yellow card) 76'; F. Cardoso (yellow card) 86'	Stadium: Estádio de São Luís; Attendance: 0 Referee: Vítor Ferreira

8 February 2021 18	Marítimo	1–2	Santa Clara	Funchal
19:00 WET (UTC±0)	Joel 61'; Pelágio (yellow card) 72'	Report	Villanueva (yellow card) 59'; Crysan 74'; Carlos 78', (yellow card) 78'; Mansur (yellow card) 89'	Stadium: Estádio do Marítimo; Attendance: 0 Referee: Rui Costa

14 February 2021 19	Santa Clara	0–1	Braga	Ponta Delgada
17:30 WET (UTC±0)	Carlos (yellow card) 75'; Villanueva (yellow card) 83'; Patric (yellow card) 90+1'	Report	Borja 11'; Silva (yellow card) 62'; Sequeira (yellow card) 90+2'	Stadium: Estádio de São Miguel; Attendance: 0 Referee: João Pinheiro

20 February 2021 20	Gil Vicente	1–0	Santa Clara	Barcelos
17:30 WET (UTC±0)	Paulinho (yellow card) 26'; Gomes (yellow card) 63'; Samuel Lino (yellow card) 73'; Fernandes (yellow card) 81'; Pedrinho 90+2'	Report	Ramos (yellow card) 23'; Salomão (yellow card) 78'; F. Cardoso (yellow card) 89'	Stadium: Estádio Cidade de Barcelos; Attendance: 0 Referee: Gustavo Correia

27 February 2021 21	Santa Clara	3–0	Paços de Ferreira	Ponta Delgada
17:00 WET (UTC±0)	Allano 10', (yellow card) 49'; Crysan 45'; Carlos 56'	Report		Stadium: Estádio de São Miguel; Attendance: 0 Referee: Manuel Mota

5 March 2021 22	Sporting CP	2–1	Santa Clara	Lisbon
20:45 WET (UTC±0)	Gonçalves 22'; Antunes (yellow card) 90+1'; Coates 90+3'	Report	Carvalho (yellow card) 41'; Cardoso (yellow card) 62'; Costa 84'	Stadium: Estádio José Alvalade; Attendance: 0 Referee: Manuel Oliveira

13 March 2021 23	Santa Clara	2–0	Portimonense	Ponta Delgada
18:00 WET (UTC±0)		Report		Stadium: Estádio de São Miguel; Attendance: 774; Referee: Iancu Vasilica

20 March 2021 24	Santa Clara	1–1	Tondela	Ponta Delgada
15:30 WET (UTC±0)		Report		Stadium: Estádio de São Miguel; Attendance: 0 Referee: Hélder Malheiro

3 April 2021 25	Porto	2–1	Santa Clara	Porto
16:00 WEST (UTC+1)	Oliveira 49' (pen.); Manafá (yellow card) 53'; Leite (yellow card) 54'; Martínez (yellow card) 90+4', (goal) 90+5'	Report	Marco (yellow card) 47'; Carlos 56' (pen.), (yellow card) 73'; Nené (yellow card) 90+4'	Stadium: Estádio do Dragão; Attendance: 0 Referee: Hugo Miguel

11 April 2021 26	Santa Clara	5–1	Nacional	Ponta Delgada
15:30 WEST (UTC+1)	Villanueva 4'; Lincoln (yellow card) 14'; Rui Costa 35' 47'; Rafael Ramos (yellow card) 69'; Carlos 79'; Ukra 90+6' (pen.)	Report	Thill (yellow card) 8'; Rui Correia 66' (yellow card) 90+6'; Kalindi (yellow card) 77'	Stadium: Estádio de São Miguel; Attendance: 0 Referee: (Portugal) Gustavo Fernandes Correia

17 April 2021 27	Vitória de Guimarães	1–0	Santa Clara	Guimarães
15:30 WEST (UTC+1)	Rochinha 17'; Agu (yellow card) 90+4'	Report	Anderson Carvalho (yellow card) 13'	Stadium: Estádio D. Afonso Henriques; Attendance: 0 Referee: (Portugal) Rui Manuel Gomes Costa

21 April 2021 28	Santa Clara	0–0	Moreirense	Ponta Delgada
15:30 WEST (UTC+1)	Carlos (yellow card) 21'; Fábio Cardoso (yellow card) 34'; Anderson Carvalho (yellow card) 52'; Lincoln (yellow card) 68'; Villanueva (yellow card) 71'	Report	Rafael Martins (yellow card) 45+1'; Gonçalo Franco (yellow card) 68'; Fábio Pacheco (yellow card) 90+1'	Stadium: Estádio de São Miguel; Attendance: 0 Referee: (Portugal) Vitor Jorge Fernandes Ferriera

26 April 2021 29	Benfica	2–1	Santa Clara	Lisbon
19:00 WEST (UTC+1)	Carlos 25' (o.g.); Chiquinho 73'; Weigl (yellow card) 89'; Otamendi (yellow card) 90+2'	Report	Anderson Carvalho 62'	Stadium: Estádio da Luz; Attendance: 0 Referee: (Portugal) Hélder Miguel Azevedo Malheiro

1 May 2021 30	Santa Clara	3–3	Boavista	Ponta Delgada
18:00 WEST (UTC+1)	Anderson Carvalho (yellow card) 34'; Lincoln 45'; Carlos 50'; Mansur (yellow card) 58'; Morita (yellow card) 90+1'; Fábio Cardoso 90+4'	Report	Elis 17' 75'; Porozo (yellow card) 54'; Nuno Santos (yellow card) 66' (yellow-red card) 66'; Marco Pereira 69' (o.g.); Léo Jardim (yellow card) 90'	Stadium: Estádio de São Miguel; Attendance: 0 Referee: (Portugal) Rui Manuel Gomes Costa

7 May 2021 31	Famalicão	1–0	Santa Clara	Vila Nova de Famalicão
19:00 WEST (UTC+1)	Riccieli (yellow card) 21'; Alexandre Guedes (yellow card) 65'; Ivo Rodrigues 82' (pen.); Valenzuela (yellow card) 88'; Diogo Queirós (yellow card) 90+2'	Report	Villaneuva (yellow card) 13'; Nené (yellow card) 35' (red card) 35'; Marco Pereira (yellow card) 77'; Sagna (yellow card) 82' (yellow-red card) 90+8'; Crysan (yellow card) 90+2'	Stadium: Estádio Municipal 22 de Junho; Attendance: 0 Referee: (Portugal) Luis Miguel Branco Godinho

11 May 2021 32	Santa Clara	1–0	Rio Ave	Ponta Delgada
16:00 WEST (UTC+1)	Mansur (yellow card) 38'; Villanueva (yellow card) 45+1'; Carlos 52'; Allano (yellow card) 69'; Crysan (yellow card) 90+3'	Report	Guga (yellow card) 47'; Fábio Coentrão (yellow card) 73'; Meshino (yellow card) 79'; Filipe Augusto (yellow card) 84'	Stadium: Estádio de São Miguel; Attendance: 0 Referee: (Portugal) Hugo Miguel

16 May 2021 33	Belenenses	0–2	Santa Clara	Lisbon
17:00 WEST (UTC+1)	Tiago Esgaio (yellow card) 8'	Report	Carlos 9' (pen.) 60'; Anderson Carvalho (yellow card) 47'	Stadium: Estádio Nacional; Attendance: 0 Referee: (Portugal) Hélder Malheiro

19 May 2021 34	Santa Clara	4–0	Farense	Ponta Delgada
20:00 WEST (UTC+1)	Carlos (yellow card) 12' (goal) 63'; Crysan 33'; Nené (yellow card) 40'; Morita 45'; Allano 59' (yellow card) 60'	Report	Claudio Falcão (yellow card) 29'; Pedro Henrique (yellow card) 48'; Licá (yellow card) 80'	Stadium: Estádio de São Miguel; Attendance: 0 Referee: (Portugal) João Pinheiro (referee)

=== Taça de Portugal ===
13 December 2020 Fourth round	Vitória de Guimarães	0–1	Santa Clara	Guimarães
15:00 WET (UTC±0)	Sacko (yellow card) 43'; Varela (yellow card) 90+4'	Report	Júlio Romão 8'; Ramos (yellow card) 24'	Stadium: Estádio D. Afonso Henriques; Attendance: 0 Referee: Manuel Oliveira

29 January 2021 Quarter-finals	Braga	2–1	Santa Clara	Braga
19:45 WET (UTC±0)	R. Horta 25', (yellow card) 40'; Ruiz 43'	Report	Villanueva (yellow card) 90'; Crysan 90+6'	Stadium: Estádio Municipal de Braga; Attendance: 0 Referee: Nuno Almeida
