= 2021–22 C.D. Santa Clara season =

C.D. Santa Clara
2021–22 season
- President: Rui Miguel Melo Cordeiro
- Manager: Daniel Ramos
- Stadium: Estádio de São Miguel
- Primeira Liga: 10th
- Taça de Portugal: Fourth round
- Taça da Liga: Semi-finals
- UEFA Europa Conference League: Play-off round
- Top goalscorer: League: Crysan (7); All: Crysan (7)
Home colours	Away colours
- All statistics correct as of 6 March 2022.

The 2021–22 season is the 101st season in the existence of C.D. Santa Clara and the club's third consecutive season in the top flight of Portuguese football. In addition to the domestic league, Santa Clara will participate in this season's edition of the Taça de Portugal, Taça da Liga, and the UEFA Europa Conference League.

== Players ==
=== First-team squad ===
As of 16 February 2022

Note: Flags indicate national team as defined under FIFA eligibility rules; some limited exceptions apply. Players may hold more than one non-FIFA nationality.

No.	Pos.	Nation	Player
1	GK	POR	Ricardo Fernandes
2	DF	POR	Rafael Ramos
3	DF	VEN	Mikel Villanueva
4	DF	TOG	Kennedy Boateng
5	DF	POR	João Afonso
6	DF	BRA	Mansur
7	FW	BRA	Allano
8	MF	BRA	Anderson Carvalho
10	MF	BRA	Lincoln
11	MF	POR	Costinha
15	DF	ROU	Andrei Chindriș
16	DF	POR	Paulo Henrique
17	DF	URU	Cristian González

No.	Pos.	Nation	Player
18	MF	POR	Rúben Oliveira
19	MF	BRA	Júlio Romão
20	FW	COL	Oscar Barreto
21	MF	POR	Nené
23	FW	BRA	Crysan
25	MF	JPN	Hidemasa Morita
30	MF	IRI	Mohammad Mohebi
77	FW	POR	Rui Costa
95	DF	SEN	Pierre Sagna
97	GK	POR	Rodolfo Cardoso
98	MF	POR	Ricardinho
99	GK	POR	Marco Pereira
—	FW	JPN	Kyosuke Tagawa (on loan from F.C. Tokyo)

=== Out on loan ===
Note: Flags indicate national team as defined under FIFA eligibility rules; some limited exceptions apply. Players may hold more than one non-FIFA nationality.

No.	Pos.	Nation	Player
—	FW	POR	André Mesquita (on loan at Vitória de Setúbal until 30 June 2022)
—	FW	POR	Diogo Motty (on loan at União de Santarém until 30 June 2022)
—	FW	MAR	Mohamed Bouldini (on loan at CF Fuenlabrada until 30 June 2022)

No.	Pos.	Nation	Player
—	FW	HON	Jonathan Toro (on loan at Académica until 30 June 2022)
—	FW	URU	Gustavo Viera (at Fénix until 30 June 2022)

== Pre-season and friendlies ==
Win Draw Loss Fixtures

== Competitions ==
=== Overall record ===
Competition	First match	Last match	Starting round	Final position	Record							
Competition	First match	Last match	Starting round	Final position	Pld	W	D	L	GF	GA	GD	Win %
Primeira Liga	August 2021	May 2022	Matchday 1		25	7	8	10	30	43	−13	28.00
Taça de Portugal	16 October 2021	20 November 2021	Third round	Fourth round	2	1	0	1	2	6	−4	50.00
Taça da Liga	1 August 2021	26 January 2022	Second round	Semi-finals	4	1	2	1	6	5	+1	25.00
UEFA Europa Conference League	22 July 2021	26 August 2021	Second qualifying round	Play-off round	6	5	0	1	10	3	+7	83.33
Total					37	14	10	13	48	57	−9	37.84

Last updated: 6 March 2022
Source: Soccerway

=== Primeira Liga ===
==== League table ====
Pos	Team	Pld	W	D	L	GF	GA	GD	Pts	Qualification or relegation
5	Gil Vicente	34	13	12	9	47	42	+5	51	Qualification for the Europa Conference League third qualifying round (Note: Since the winners of the 2021–22 Taça de Portugal, Porto, qualified for the Champions League based on league position, the spot awarded to the fourth-placed team (Europa Conference League third qualifying round) was passed to the fifth-placed team, and the spot awarded to the fifth-placed team (Europa Conference League second qualifying round) was passed to the sixth-placed team.)
6	Vitória de Guimarães	34	13	9	12	50	41	+9	48	Qualification for the Europa Conference League second qualifying round
7	Santa Clara	34	9	13	12	38	54	−16	40	
8	Famalicão	34	9	12	13	45	51	−6	39 (Note: Head-to-head points: Famalicão 4, Estoril 1.)	
9	Estoril	34	9	12	13	36	43	−7	39	

Source: Liga Portugal
Rules for classification: 1) Points; 2) Head-to-head points; 3) Head-to-head goal difference; 4) Head-to-head away goals scored; 5) Goal difference; 6) Matches won; 7) Goals scored; 8) Play-off.

==== Results summary ====
Overall								Home						Away					
Pld	W	D	L	GF	GA	GD	Pts	W	D	L	GF	GA	GD	W	D	L	GF	GA	GD
25	7	8	10	30	43	−13	29	6	4	3	18	21	−3	1	4	7	12	22	−10

Last updated: 6 March 2022.
Source: Liga Portugal

==== Results by round ====
Round	1
Ground	
Result	
Position	

Updated to match(es) played on 6 March 2022. Source: Liga Portugal
A = Away; H = Home; W = Win; D = Draw; L = Loss

=== Taça da Liga ===
1 August 2021 Second round	Farense	0–0 (0–3 p)	Santa Clara	Faro
15:30 WEST (UTC+1)		Report		Stadium: Estádio de São Luís; Attendance: 461; Referee: Hugo Silva
	Penalties
	Otávio Gut (penalty missed); Amine Oudrhiri (penalty missed); Elves Baldé (penalty missed)		(penalty scored) Lincoln; (penalty scored) Nené; (penalty scored) Mikel Villanueva

=== UEFA Europa Conference League ===
==== Second qualifying round ====
The draw for the second qualifying round was held on 16 June 2021.

22 July 2021 First leg	Shkupi (North Macedonia)	0–3	(Portugal) Santa Clara	Skopje, North Macedonia
20:00		Report	Rwatubyaye 30' (o.g.); Carlos 49'; Costinha 90+3'	Stadium: Toše Proeski Arena (Note: Shkupi played their home match at Toše Proeski Arena, Skopje, instead of their regular stadium Čair Stadium, Skopje, which did not meet UEFA requirements.); Attendance: 2,000; Referee: Kai Erik Steen (Norway)

29 July 2021 Second leg	Santa Clara (Portugal)	2–0 (5–0 agg.)	(North Macedonia) Shkupi	Ponta Delgada, Portugal
21:00 (19:00 AZOST)	Carlos 13'; Villanueva 39'	Report		Stadium: Estádio de São Miguel; Attendance: 1,000; Referee: Rob Hennessy (Republic of Ireland)

==== Third qualifying round ====
The draw for the third qualifying round was held on 19 July 2021.

5 August 2021 First leg	Santa Clara (Portugal)	2–0	(Slovenia) Olimpija Ljubljana	Ponta Delgada, Portugal
20:30 WEST (UTC+1)	Carlos 14'; Mansur 45+2'	Report		Stadium: Estádio de São Miguel; Referee: Harald Lechner (Austria)

12 August 2021 Second leg	Olimpija Ljubljana (Slovenia)	0–1 (0–3 agg.)	(Portugal) Santa Clara	Ljubljana, Slovenia
20:00 CEST (UTC+2)		Report	Rui Costa 73'	Stadium: Ljubljana Sports Park; Referee: Ali Palabıyık (Turkey)

==== Play-off round ====
The draw for the play-off round was held on 2 August 2021.

19 August 2021 First leg	Santa Clara (Portugal)	2–1	(Serbia) Partizan	Ponta Delgada, Portugal
20:30 WEST (UTC+1)	Carlos 4'; Morita 49'	Report	Vujačić 54'	Stadium: Estádio de São Miguel; Referee: Serdar Gözübüyük (Netherlands)

26 August 2021 Second leg	Partizan (Serbia)	2–0 (3–2 agg.)	(Portugal) Santa Clara	Belgrade, Serbia
21:00 CEST (UTC+2)	Gomes 25' (pen.); Saničanin 27'	Report		Stadium: Partizan Stadium; Referee: Craig Pawson (England)
