= João Lucas =

João Lucas may refer to:

- João Lucas (footballer, born 1979) (1979–2015), Portuguese footballer
- João Lucas (footballer, born 1991), Brazilian football left-back
- João Lucas (footballer, born 1993), Brazilian football goalkeeper
- João Lucas (footballer, born 1996), Portuguese footballer
- João Lucas (footballer, born 1998), Brazilian footballer
- João Lucas (footballer, born 2000), Brazilian footballer
- João Lucas & Marcelo, a sertanejo style Brazilian singing duo
