= Rodolfo Cardoso =

Rodolfo Cardoso may refer to:

- Rodolfo Tan Cardoso (1937–2013), Filipino chessmaster
- Rodolfo Cardoso (footballer, born 1968), Argentine former footballer who played as a midfielder
- Rodolfo Cardoso (footballer, born 1997), Portuguese footballer who plays as a goalkeeper
