= Rui Silva =

Rui Silva may refer to:

- Rui Silva (runner) (born 1977), Portuguese athlete
- Rui Pedro Silva (born 1977), Portuguese football manager
- Rui Pedro Silva (born 1981), Portuguese athlete
- Rui Silva (handballer) (born 1993), Portuguese handballer
- Rui Silva (footballer, born 1994), Portuguese footballer who plays as a goalkeeper
- Rui Silva (footballer, born 1996), Portuguese footballer who plays as a defender
