= Lincoln (footballer, born 1998) =

Brazilian footballer

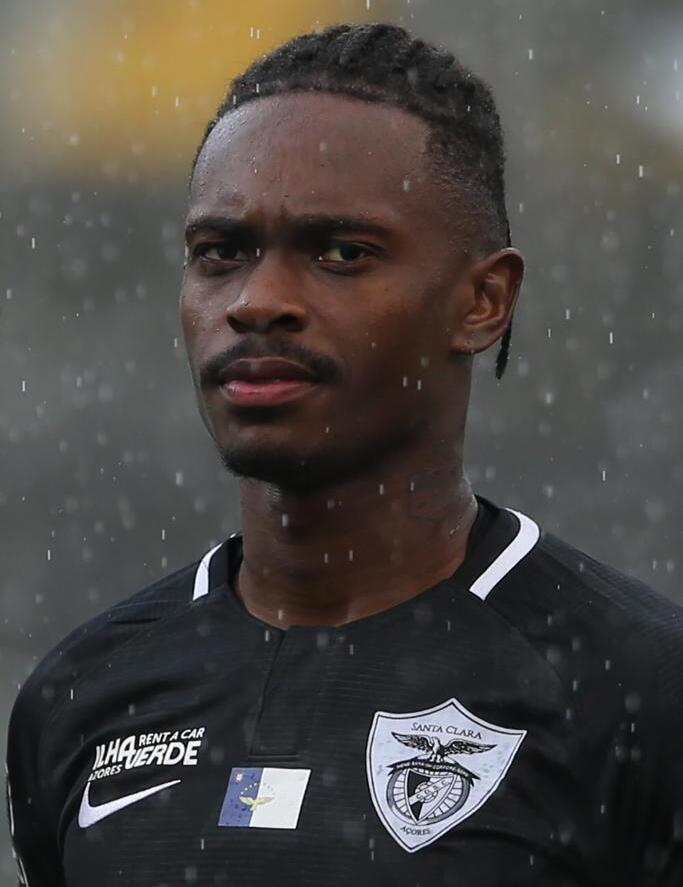
- Lincoln in 2020

Personal information
- Full name: Abraham Lincoln Henrique Oliveira dos Santos
- Date of birth: 7 November 1998 (age 28)
- Place of birth: Porto Alegre, Brazil
- Height: 1.74 m (5 ft 9 in)
- Positions: Attacking midfielder; winger

Team information
- Current team: Bursaspor
- Number: 10

Youth career
- 2007–2014: Grêmio

Senior career*
Years	Team	Apps	(Gls)
2015–2019	Grêmio	21	(0)
2017–2018	→ Çaykur Rizespor (loan)	18	(3)
2018	→ América Mineiro (loan)	3	(0)
2019–2022	Santa Clara	92	(7)
2022–2025	Fenerbahçe	21	(0)
2024	→ Red Bull Bragantino (loan)	28	(3)
2025	→ Hull City (loan)	11	(0)
2025–2026	Alverca	30	(2)
2026–	Bursaspor	10	(2)

International career
2013	Brazil U15		
2014–2015	Brazil U17	12	(3)
- * Club domestic league appearances and goals as of 19 October 2026

Lincoln Henrique Oliveira dos Santos (born 7 November 1998), commonly known as Lincoln or Lincoln Henrique, is a Brazilian professional footballer who plays as an attacking midfielder or a winger for Turkish TFF 1. Lig club Bursaspor.

== Club career ==
=== Grêmio ===
Lincoln started his football career at youth level with Grêmio. Regarded as an exceptionally promising talent, he was named one of the 50 most promising players born in 1998 in world football by The Guardian's Next Generation series. He signed a professional contract with the team in 2014 and made his Série A debut in a 3–3 tie against Ponte Preta on 10 May 2015.

==== Çaykur Rizespor (loan) ====
On 9 September 2017, he moved abroad for the first time in his career, transferring to Turkey for TFF First League team Çaykur Rizespor on a one-year loan.

On 9 September 2017, he made his 1. Lig debut in a 4–3 away win over Altınordu. On 20 March 2018, he helped to the team with a hat-trick in a 5–1 thrashing of Gaziantepspor.

Lincoln helped the Turkish side win the 1. Lig title and recording three goals and two assists in 20 appearances in all competitions.

==== América Mineiro (loan) ====
On 3 September 2018, he was loaned to Brazilian Série A team América Mineiro until the end of the season and made his debut in a 2–1 away win over Vasco da Gama on 7 September 2018.

=== Santa Clara ===
On 1 July 2019, he transferred to Portugal for Primeira Liga team Santa Clara on a four-year deal. He made his Portuguese football debut in a 0–0 tie against B-SAD on 25 August 2019.

=== Fenerbahçe ===
On 1 July 2022, he returned to Turkey, signing for Süper Lig side Fenerbahçe on a four-year deal for €3.5 million. He was the first transfer of new manager Jorge Jesus and became a first-eleven player in multiple positions as central midfielder, attacking midfielder, left/right winger or left back.

He made his UEFA Champions League debut in the second qualifying round first match, an away 0–0 tie against Dynamo Kyiv on 20 July 2022. On 4 August 2022, he made his UEFA Europa League debut in the third qualifying round first match, a 3–0 win over Slovácko.

On 9 March 2023, he ruptured the anterior cruciate ligament (ACL) in his left knee in the UEFA Europa League round of 16 match against Sevilla and was expected to be out for about seven months. On 17 January 2024, he played for the first time in ten months against Adanaspor in a Turkish Cup match and scored one goal and made an assist.

==== Red Bull Bragantino (loan) ====
On 8 February 2024, Lincoln moved on loan to Red Bull Bragantino until the end of 2024.

On 10 February 2024, he made his debut with the team against São Bernardo in a 1–1 tie Campeonato Paulista match. On 28 April 2024, he made his Série A with the team against Fortaleza in a 1–1 tie.

==== Hull City (loan) ====
On 23 January 2025, Lincoln joined EFL Championship club Hull City on loan for the remainder of the 2024–25 season.

=== Alverca ===
On 28 August 2025, Lincoln returned to Portugal, joining recently-promoted Primeira Liga club Alverca.

== Style of play ==
A talented and creative playmaker, with an eye for goal, Lincoln usually played in a free role as an attacking midfielder. He was known for his passing, technical skills, control, low centre of gravity, vision, reading of the game, and ability to provide many assists for his teammates, in addition to being capable of scoring himself, in particular from set pieces. In addition to his usual role as a number ten, he was also deployed as abox-to-box center midfielder on occasion throughout his career, or even on the left winger.

== Career statistics ==
As of 7 October 2026.

Appearances and goals by club, season and competition
Club	Season	League			National cup (Note: Includes Copa do Brasil, Taça de Portugal, Turkish Cup and FA Cup)		Continental		Other		Total	
Club	Season	Division	Apps	Goals	Apps	Goals	Apps	Goals	Apps	Goals	Apps	Goals
Grêmio	2015	Série A	2	0	1	1	0	0	8 (Note: Appearances in Campeonato Gaúcho)	0	11	1
Grêmio	2016	Série A	10	0	0	0	5 (Note: Appearances in Copa Libertadores)	1	14	3	29	4
Grêmio	2017	Série A	8	0	1	0	2	0	10	0	21	0
Grêmio	2018	Série A	1	0	0	0	0	0	0	0	1	0
Grêmio	Total		21	0	2	1	7	1	32	3	62	5
América Mineiro (loan)	2018	Série A	3	0	0	0	0	0	0	0	3	0
Çaykur Rizespor (loan)	2017–18	TFF First League	18	3	2	0	—		—		20	3
Santa Clara	2019–20	Primeira Liga	30	1	1	0	—		3 (Note: Appearances in Taça da Liga)	0	34	1
Santa Clara	2020–21	Primeira Liga	30	1	2	0	—		0	0	32	1
Santa Clara	2021–22	Primeira Liga	32	5	2	1	6 (Note: Appearances in UEFA Europa League)	0	4	1	44	7
Santa Clara	Total		92	7	5	1	6	0	7	1	110	9
Fenerbahçe	2022–23	Süper Lig	21	0	2	0	12 (Note: Two appearances in UEFA Champions League, ten appearances and two goals in UEFA Europa League)	2	—		35	2
Fenerbahçe	2023–24	Süper Lig	0	0	1	1	0	0	0	0	1	1
Fenerbahçe	Total		21	0	3	1	12	2	0	0	36	3
Red Bull Bragantino (loan)	2024	Série A	28	3	4	0	11 (Note: Four appearances in Copa Libertadores, seven appearances and two goal in Copa Sudamericana)	2	6 (Note: Appearances in Campeonato Paulista)	0	49	5
Hull City (loan)	2024–25	Championship	11	0	0	0	—		0	0	11	0
Alverca	2025–26	Primeira Liga	8	1	1	0	—		1	0	10	1
Bursaspor	2026–27	1. Lig	8	2	0	0	—		—		8	2
Career total			210	16	17	3	36	5	53	4	309	25

== Honours ==
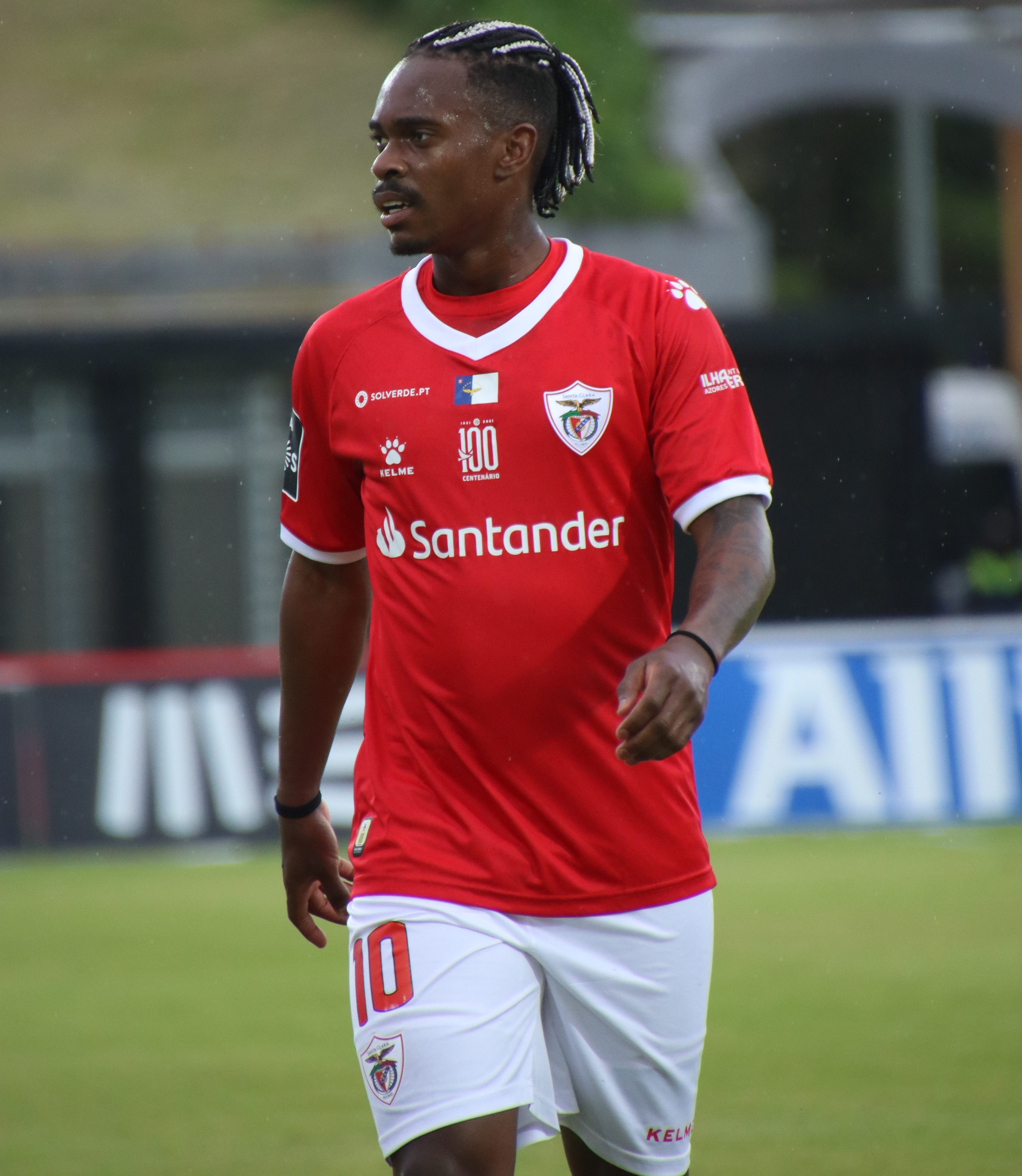
Lincoln with Santa Clara

Grêmio

- Copa do Brasil: 2016
- Campeonato Gaúcho: 2019

Çaykur Rizespor

- TFF First League: 2017–18

Fenerbahçe

- Turkish Cup: 2022–23

Brazil U17

- Torneio Nike Friendlies: 2014
- Torneio Libertador Bernardo O'Higgins: 2014
- South American Under-17 Football Championship: 2015
- Suwon Cup: 2015
