= Anderson Carvalho =

Brazilian footballer (born 1990)

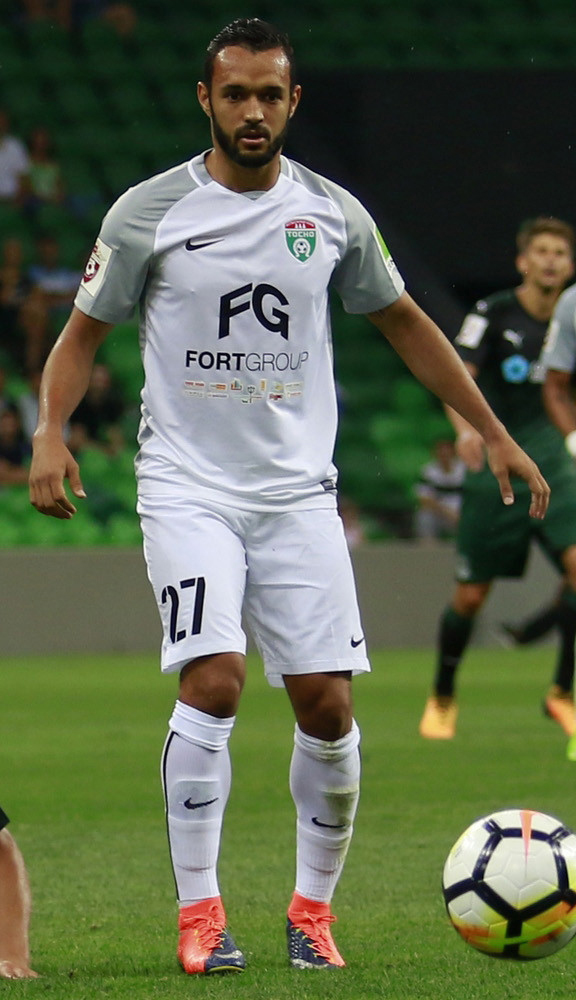
- Carvalho with FC Tosno in 2017

Personal information
- Full name: Anderson de Carvalho Santos
- Date of birth: 20 May 1990 (age 36)
- Place of birth: Cubatão, Brazil
- Height: 1.76 m (5 ft 9 in)
- Position: Defensive midfielder

Youth career
- 2000–2010: Santos

Senior career*
| Years | Team | Apps | (Gls) |
| 2011–2014 | Santos | 15 | (1) |
| 2012 | → Vissel Kobe (loan) | 0 | (0) |
| 2013 | → Penapolense (loan) | 11 | (1) |
| 2014–2017 | Boavista | 78 | (5) |
| 2017–2018 | FC Tosno | 1 | (0) |
| 2018–2023 | Santa Clara | 99 | (2) |
- * Club domestic league appearances and goals as of 21:26, 13 January 2023 (UTC)

Anderson de Carvalho Santos (born 20 May 1990) is a Brazilian footballer who plays as a defensive midfielder. Currently a free agent, he most recently played for Portuguese club Santa Clara.

== Career ==
Born in Cubatão, Carvalho made his debut as a professional on 30 January 2011, replacing Rodrigo Possebon in a 2–0 home success against São Paulo, for the Campeonato Paulista championship. Three days later he was handed his first start, playing 56 minutes in a 2–2 away draw against Ponte Preta, but being replaced due to Rafael's ejection.

In August 2012, Carvalho was loaned to Japanese club Vissel Kobe until December. However, he suffered with muscular injuries in Japan, and returned to Brazil without appearing for the club. On 11 December, he was loaned out to Penapolense until the end of 2013 Campeonato Paulista.

On 1 July 2014, Carvalho was deemed surplus to requirements by new manager Oswaldo de Oliveira, and after rescinding his link with Peixe, joined Portuguese side Boavista in a three-year deal. He played his first match in a 1-0 home victory against Académica, and two weeks later scored two goals in a 3-2 home victory against Gil Vicente.

On 1 July 2017, he signed a 2-year contract with the Russian Premier League club FC Tosno.

== Career statistics ==
As of 13 January 2023

| Club | Season | League | | | State League | | Cup | | Continental | | Other | | Total | |
| Club | Season | Division | Apps | Goals | Apps | Goals | Apps | Goals | Apps | Goals | Apps | Goals | Apps | Goals |
|---|---|---|---|---|---|---|---|---|---|---|---|---|---|---|
| Santos | 2011 | Série A | 5 | 0 | 2 | 0 | — | | — | | — | | 7 | 0 |
| Santos | 2012 | Série A | 1 | 0 | 7 | 1 | — | | 0 | 0 | — | | 8 | 1 |
| Santos | Total | | 6 | 0 | 9 | 1 | — | | 0 | 0 | — | | 15 | 1 |
| Vissel Kobe (loan) | 2012 | J. League Division 1 | 0 | 0 | — | | — | | — | | — | | 0 | 0 |
| Penapolense (loan) | 2013 | Série D | 0 | 0 | 11 | 1 | — | | — | | — | | 11 | 1 |
| Boavista | 2014–15 | Primeira Liga | 20 | 2 | — | | 1 | 0 | — | | 4 | 0 | 25 | 2 |
| Boavista | 2015–16 | Primeira Liga | 30 | 2 | — | | 2 | 0 | — | | 0 | 0 | 32 | 2 |
| Boavista | 2016–17 | Primeira Liga | 28 | 1 | — | | 0 | 0 | — | | 1 | 0 | 29 | 1 |
| Boavista | Total | | 78 | 5 | — | | 3 | 0 | — | | 5 | 0 | 86 | 5 |
| FC Tosno | 2017–18 | Russian Premier League | 1 | 0 | — | | 0 | 0 | — | | — | | 1 | 0 |
| Santa Clara | 2018–19 | Primeira Liga | 16 | 0 | — | | 1 | 0 | — | | 0 | 0 | 17 | 0 |
| Santa Clara | 2019–20 | Primeira Liga | 16 | 0 | — | | 3 | 0 | — | | 1 (Note: Appearance(s) in Taça da Liga) | 0 | 20 | 0 |
| Santa Clara | 2020–21 | Primeira Liga | 29 | 1 | — | | 3 | 0 | — | | 0 | 0 | 32 | 1 |
| Santa Clara | 2021–22 | Primeira Liga | 27 | 0 | — | | 2 | 0 | 5 (Note: Appearances in UEFA Europa Conference League) | 0 | 3 | 0 | 37 | 0 |
| Santa Clara | 2022–23 | Primeira Liga | 11 | 0 | — | | 1 | 0 | — | | 0 | 0 | 12 | 0 |
| Santa Clara | Total | | 99 | 1 | — | | 10 | 0 | 5 | 0 | 4 | 0 | 118 | 1 |
| Career total | | | 184 | 6 | 20 | 2 | 13 | 0 | 5 | 0 | 8 | 0 | 231 | 8 |

== Honours ==
=== Club ===
Santos

- Campeonato Paulista: 2011, 2012
