= Pierre Sagna (footballer) =

Senegalese footballer (born 1990)

Personal information
- Full name: Pierre Emmanuel Sagna
- Date of birth: 21 August 1990 (age 36)
- Place of birth: Dakar, Senegal
- Height: 1.83 m (6 ft 0 in)
- Position: Right back

Youth career
- Valenciennes

Senior career*
Years	Team	Apps	(Gls)
2009–2011	Valenciennes B	16	(0)
2011–2015	Chaves	81	(1)
2015–2018	Moreirense	53	(1)
2018–2019	Belenenses SAD	13	(0)
2019–2020	Panetolikos	18	(1)
2020–2023	Santa Clara	62	(0)
2023	Dijon	0	(0)
2023	Dijon B	7	(0)
2024	Alverca	12	(0)
2024–2025	União Santarém	17	(1)
2025–2026	Leça	1	(0)
- * Club domestic league appearances and goals as of 31 May 2026

Pierre Sagna (born 21 August 1990) is a Senegalese footballer who plays as a full back.

== International career ==
Sagna was born in Senegal, and moved to the France at the age of 10 - he is eligible for both national teams, but prefers to aim for the Senegal national football team.

== Career statistics ==
As of match played 28 May 2023

Appearances and goals by club, season and competition
Club	Season	League			National cup		League cup		Europe		Other		Total	
Club	Season	Division	Apps	Goals	Apps	Goals	Apps	Goals	Apps	Goals	Apps	Goals	Apps	Goals
Valenciennes	2010–11	Ligue 1	0	0	0	0	—		—		—		0	0
Chaves	2011–12	Segunda Liga	32	0	0	0	0	0	—		—		32	0
Chaves	2013–14	Segunda Liga	26	0	3	0	1	0	—		—		30	0
Chaves	2014–15	Segunda Liga	23	1	2	0	4	0	—		—		28	1
Chaves	Total		81	1	5	0	5	0	—		—		90	1
Moreirense	2015–16	Primeira Liga	26	1	0	0	1	0	—		—		27	1
Moreirense	2016–17	Primeira Liga	30	0	0	0	2	0	—		—		32	0
Moreirense	2017–18	Primeira Liga	27	0	3	0	3	0	—		—		33	0
Moreirense	Total		83	1	3	0	6	0	—		—		92	1
B-SAD	2018–19	Primeira Liga	13	0	1	0	2	0	—		—		16	0
Panetolikos	2019–20	Super League Greece	18	1	4	0	—		—		—		22	1
Santa Clara	2019–20	Primeira Liga	7	0	3	0	0	0	—		—		10	0
Santa Clara	2020–21	Primeira Liga	14	0	3	0	0	0	—		—		17	0
Santa Clara	2021–22	Primeira Liga	17	0	0	0	4	0	1 (Note: Appearance(s) in UEFA Europa Conference League)	0	—		22	0
Santa Clara	2022–23	Primeira Liga	24	0	1	0	2	0	—		—		27	0
Santa Clara	Total		62	1	7	0	6	0	1	0	—		76	1
Career total			257	3	20	0	19	0	1	0	0	0	296	3

== Honors ==
Moreirense

- Taça da Liga: 2016–17
