= Mosteirô =

Former civil parish in Portugal

- Civil parish
- Location in Portugal
- Coordinates: 40.899°N 8.531°W
- Country: Portugal
- Region: Norte
- Metropolitan area: Porto
- District: Aveiro
- Municipality: Santa Maria da Feira
- Disbanded: 2013

Area
  - Total: 2.95 km^{2} (1.14 sq mi)

Population (2001)
  - Total: 2,043
  - Density: 690/km^{2} (1,800/sq mi)
- Time zone: UTC+00:00 (WET)
  - Summer (DST): UTC+01:00 (WEST)

Mosteirô is a former civil parish in the municipality of Santa Maria da Feira, Portugal. In 2013, the parish merged into the new parish São Miguel do Souto e Mosteirô. It has a population of 2,043 inhabitants and a total area of 2.95 km^{2}.

== Sites of interests ==
- Traces of an ancient road near Mosteirô
