= Prince Bonkat =

Nigerian football player

Personal information
- Full name: Prince Masino Bonkat
- Date of birth: 22 May 1996 (age 30)
- Place of birth: Kaduna, Nigeria
- Positions: Winger; forward

Team information
- Current team: Fontinhas

Youth career
- 2014–2015: Paços de Ferreira

Senior career*
Years	Team	Apps	(Gls)
2015–2016	Amarante	30	(2)
2017	Vizela	16	(1)
2017–2019	Montalegre	54	(8)
2019–2020	Vila Real	22	(4)
2020–2021	Coimbrões	17	(3)
2021–	Fontinhas	2	(0)
- * Club domestic league appearances and goals as of 21 October 2021

Prince Masino Bonkat (born 22 May 1996) is a Nigerian football player who plays as a forward for Fontinhas.

== Club career ==
He made his professional debut in the Segunda Liga for Vizela on 14 January 2017 in a game against Académico de Viseu.
