= Serginho (footballer, born 1982) =

Portuguese footballer

Personal information
- Full name: Sérgio Gabriel da Silva Andrade
- Date of birth: 6 December 1982 (age 43)
- Place of birth: Souto, Portugal
- Height: 1.91 m (6 ft 3 in)
- Position: Goalkeeper

Youth career
- 1991–1993: Feirense
- 1996–1999: Soutense
- 1999–2001: União Lamas

Senior career*
Years	Team	Apps	(Gls)
2001–2005	União Lamas	25	(0)
2005–2006	Lusitânia		
2006–2012	Vitória Guimarães	6	(0)
2011	→ Covilhã (loan)	15	(0)
2012	Portimonense	13	(0)
2012–2013	Arouca	40	(0)
2013–2014	Santa Clara	41	(0)
2014	Chaves	0	(0)
2014–2015	Santa Clara	40	(0)
2015–2016	Gil Vicente	46	(0)
2016–2019	Santa Clara	72	(0)
2019–2020	Varzim	20	(0)
2020–2021	Trofense	22	(0)
2021–2022	Lusitânia	16	(0)
Total		356	(0)
- * Club domestic league appearances and goals

Sérgio Gabriel da Silva Andrade (born 6 December 1982), known as Serginho, is a Portuguese former professional footballer who played as a goalkeeper.

He played 12 Primeira Liga matches for Vitória de Guimarães and Santa Clara, but spent most of his career in LigaPro, making 290 appearances for nine clubs, including three spells at Santa Clara.

== Club career ==
Born in Souto (Santa Maria da Feira), Serginho spent his youth career at local clubs C.D. Feirense, C.D. Soutense and C.F. União de Lamas. He made his Segunda Liga debut for the last of those on the final day of 2000–01, coming on as a substitute for Ivo Oliveira for the last four minutes of a 2–0 home loss against C.D. Santa Clara. He appeared in a handful more matches over the next four seasons, with the latter half in the third division.

After a year in the fourth tier with Lusitânia FC, Serginho was signed by Vitória S.C. of the Primeira Liga in the summer of 2006. He made his debut in the last matchday, 19 minutes as a replacement for Nilson in a 1–1 draw with S.C. Olhanense at the Estádio D. Afonso Henriques. Having barely made a mark during his tenure, he left on loan for division-two S.C. Covilhã in January 2011 on loan for the rest of the campaign.

In January 2012, Vitória and Serginho reached an agreement to sever his contract, and he moved to Portimonense S.C. thereafter. After a year playing regularly for F.C. Arouca, promoted as runners-up to C.F. Os Belenenses, he joined Santa Clara in July 2013. He briefly left the team from the Azorean for G.D. Chaves, before rescinding his contract there and heading back in August 2014.

After one year as an ever-present fixture for Gil Vicente FC, Serginho signed for a third time to Santa Clara in 2016. In April the following year, he agreed to an extension until June 2018. He won a second promotion as runners-up in 2017–18, but Marco Pereira was preferred for the ensuing top-flight campaign.

In June 2019, Serginho became Varzim S.C.'s first new signing of the season.
