= São Miguel do Souto e Mosteirô =

Civil parish in Portugal

- Civil parish
- Location in Portugal
- Coordinates: 40.888°N 8.551°W
- Country: Portugal
- Region: Norte
- Metropolitan area: Porto
- District: Aveiro
- Municipality: Santa Maria da Feira

Area
  - Total: 13.80 km^{2} (5.33 sq mi)

Population (2011)
  - Total: 6,734
  - Density: 490/km^{2} (1,300/sq mi)
- Time zone: UTC+00:00 (WET)
  - Summer (DST): UTC+01:00 (WEST)

São Miguel do Souto e Mosteirô is a civil parish in the municipality of Santa Maria da Feira, Portugal. It was formed in 2013 by the merger of the former parishes Souto and Mosteirô. The population in 2011 was 6,734, in an area of 13.80 km^{2}.
