= G.D. Fontinhas =

Portuguese sports club

- Full name: Grupo Desportivo das Fontinhas
- Founded: 1975
- Ground: Campo Municipal Dr. Durval Monteiro, Fontinhas
- Capacity: 1,000
- League: Campeonato de Portugal
- 2022–23: Liga 3: Relegated

Grupo Desportivo das Fontinhas is a Portuguese sports club from Fontinhas, Praia da Vitória.

The men's football team plays in the Campeonato de Portugal, the fourth tier of Portuguese football. The team notably reached the fourth round of the 2020–21 Taça de Portugal. They played in Liga 3 in the 22/23 season

Unfortunately, financial issues led to the club closing its senior football team after being relegated to Campeonato de Futebol dos Açores in the 23/24 season, with the reason being the club did not have the resources to field a team made up of Azoreans.

== Current squad ==
As of 15 January 2023

Note: Flags indicate national team as defined under FIFA eligibility rules; some limited exceptions apply. Players may hold more than one non-FIFA nationality.

No.	Pos.	Nation	Player
2	FW	POR	Ricardo Almeida
3	DF	POR	Breno Freitas
4	DF	POR	Diogo Careca
5	DF	POR	Samir Banjai
6	MF	BRA	Ragner
7	FW	NGR	Prince Bonkat
8	MF	POR	Diogo Moniz
10	MF	POR	João Dias
11	FW	POR	Diogo Motty
13	DF	POR	Samuel Velho
14	MF	POR	Hircane Graça
20	DF	POR	Vítor Miranda

No.	Pos.	Nation	Player
23	GK	POR	Leandro Vieira
27	MF	POR	Jordanes
28	DF	BRA	Itto Cruz
29	FW	POR	Luís Cacheira
33	FW	BRA	Vilmar Júnior
47	MF	MLI	Hamed Doukouré
55	DF	GHA	Prince Addico
71	DF	POR	Luciano Serpa
91	GK	CIV	Fabrice Okoua
97	GK	POR	Rodolfo Cardoso
98	DF	BRA	Desailly
99	FW	BRA	Welves (on loan from Trofense)
