= Nené (footballer, born 1995) =

Portuguese footballer (born 1995)

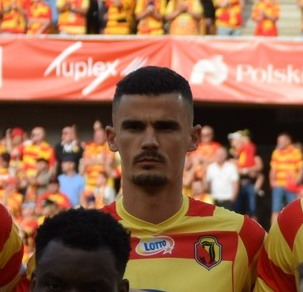
- Nené as a player of Jagiellonia Białystok in 2024

Personal information
- Full name: Rui Filipe Cunha Correia
- Date of birth: 10 June 1995 (age 31)
- Place of birth: Santa Cruz da Graciosa, Portugal
- Height: 1.87 m (6 ft 2 in)
- Position: Defensive midfielder

Team information
- Current team: Johor Darul Ta'zim
- Number: 18

Youth career
- 2003–2006: Sporting Guadalupe
- 2006–2008: Sintrense
- 2009–2012: Sporting Guadalupe
- 2012−2014: Braga

Senior career*
Years	Team	Apps	(Gls)
2014−2017	Braga B	22	(0)
2016–2017	→ Montalegre (loan)	30	(7)
2017–2019	Fafe	56	(12)
2019–2022	Santa Clara	69	(0)
2022–2025	Jagiellonia Białystok	76	(17)
2025	Yunnan Yukun	28	(2)
2026–	Johor Darul Ta'zim	1	(0)

International career
2014	Portugal U19	3	(0)
- * Club domestic league appearances and goals as of 1 February 2026

Rui Filipe Cunha Correia (born 10 June 1995), commonly known as Nené, is a Portuguese professional footballer who plays as a defensive midfielder for Malaysia Super League club Johor Darul Ta'zim.

== Club career ==
On 31 August 2014, Nené made his professional debut with Braga B in a 2014–15 Segunda Liga match against Farense. He failed to break into the first team squad so decided to build his career by gaining experience at third tier clubs.

On 11 June 2019, he signed a three-year contract with Primeira Liga club Santa Clara.

In 2022 he signed for Jagiellonia Białystok, marking the first time he played and lived abroad. Under Adrian Siemieniec, who described him as a "kind of Andrea Pirlo", he became one of the key players at the club which won a historic first ever Ekstraklasa title in 2024.

In January 2026, he signed with Malaysia Super League club Johor Darul Ta'zim.

== Personal life ==
Nene was born and raised on the small island of Graciosa. His father is a carpenter.

Nene's wife is Polish and they have a daughter who was born in Białystok.

He has been described by Bernardo Vasconcelos as the most uncontroversial and peaceful person he has ever met, with no propensity for scandals, controversies or opinions that could agitate public opinion.

== Career statistics ==
As of match played 2 November 2025

Appearances and goals by club, season and competition
Club	Season	League			National cup (Note: Includes Taça de Portugal, Polish Cup, Chinese FA Cup)		Continental		Other		Total	
Club	Season	Division	Apps	Goals	Apps	Goals	Apps	Goals	Apps	Goals	Apps	Goals
Braga B	2014–15	Liga Portugal 2	13	0	0	0	—		—		13	0
Braga B	2015–16	Liga Portugal 2	9	0	0	0	—		—		9	0
Braga B	Total		22	0	0	0	0	0	0	0	22	0
Montalegre (loan)	2016–17	Campeonato de Portugal	30	7	1	0	—		—		31	7
Fafe	2017–18	Campeonato de Portugal	23	5	1	0	—		—		24	5
Fafe	2018–19	Campeonato de Portugal	33	7	3	1	—		—		36	8
Fafe	Total		56	12	4	1	0	0	0	0	60	13
Santa Clara	2019–20	Primeira Liga	18	0	3	0	—		2 (Note: Appearances in Taça da Liga)	0	22	0
Santa Clara	2020–21	Primeira Liga	25	0	4	0	—		—		29	0
Santa Clara	2021–22	Primeira Liga	26	0	2	0	4 (Note: Appearances in UEFA Europa Conference League)	0	4	1	36	1
Santa Clara	Total		69	0	9	0	4	0	6	1	88	1
Jagiellonia Białystok	2022–23	Ekstraklasa	30	5	2	0	—		—		32	5
Jagiellonia Białystok	2023–24	Ekstraklasa	33	9	5	2	—		—		38	11
Jagiellonia Białystok	2024–25	Ekstraklasa	13	3	2	1	11 (Note: Four appearances in UEFA Champions League, two appearances in UEFA Europa League, five appearances in UEFA Conference League)	0	0	0	26	4
Jagiellonia Białystok	Total		76	17	9	3	11	0	0	0	96	20
Yunnan Yukun	2025	Chinese Super League	28	2	2	0	—		—		30	2
Career total			281	38	25	4	15	0	6	1	327	43

== Honours ==
Jagiellonia Białystok

- Ekstraklasa: 2023–24

Individual

- Ekstraklasa Player of the Month: December 2023
- Polish Union of Footballers' Ekstraklasa Team of the Season: 2023–24
