= Rui Pedro Silva (football manager) =

Portuguese football manager

Personal information
- Full name: Rui Pedro Teixeira de Jesus da Silva
- Date of birth: 14 March 1977 (age 49)
- Place of birth: Porto, Portugal

Team information
- Current team: West Ham United (assistant head coach)

Managerial career
- Years: Team
- 2010: Málaga (assistant)
- 2010–2012: Panathinaikos (assistant)
- 2012–2014: Rio Ave (assistant)
- 2014–2015: Valencia (assistant)
- 2016–2017: Porto (assistant)
- 2017–2021: Wolverhampton Wanderers (assistant)
- 2021–2022: Famalicão
- 2023–2025: Nottingham Forest (assistant)
- 2025–2026: Wolverhampton Wanderers (assistant)
- 2026–: West Ham United (assistant)

Rui Pedro Teixeira de Jesus da Silva (born 14 March 1977) is a Portuguese football manager he is the currently assistant head coach of EFL Championship club West Ham United F.C.

Having previously been an assistant to Jesualdo Ferreira and Nuno Espírito Santo in clubs around Europe, he first managed in his own right at Famalicão of the Primeira Liga in 2021.

== Career ==
Born in Porto, Silva began his career in 2005, as a scout for Jesualdo Ferreira at Braga. He followed Ferreira to Porto, Málaga and Panathinaikos, being an assistant in the latter two teams.

In May 2012, Silva joined Nuno Espírito Santo's staff at Rio Ave as his assistant, after previously working with him at Málaga and Panathinaikos. He remained as his assistant at Valencia, Porto and Wolverhampton Wanderers.

In June 2021, after Espírito Santo agreed to become the manager of Tottenham Hotspur, Silva did not follow him to his new club, stating a desire to become a first team manager. On 19 December, he was appointed in charge of Primeira Liga side Famalicão, replacing Ivo Vieira at the 16th-placed team. On his career debut two days later, his team drew 1–1 at home to Portimonense in the fifth round of the Taça de Portugal before losing 4–2 on penalties; his first league game on 9 January was a 2–2 home draw with Braga.

Silva left the club by mutual consent on 20 September 2022, having won once in seven games of the new season. His team were third-from-bottom, with four points. He subsequently returned to Espírito Santo's staff at Nottingham Forest in 2023.

On 9 December 2025, Silva returned to Wolves as assistant head coach to Rob Edwards, having previously worked with him when they were both at the club during the 2018–19 season.

== Managerial statistics ==
As of match played 10 September 2022

Managerial record by team and tenure
Team	Nat	From	To	Record							
Team	Nat	From	To	G	W	D	L	GF	GA	GD	Win %
Famalicão	(Portugal)	19 December 2021	19 September 2022	26	8	9	9	28	29	−1	30.77
Total				26	8	9	9	28	29	−1	30.77
