= João Lucas (footballer, born 1993) =

Brazilian footballer

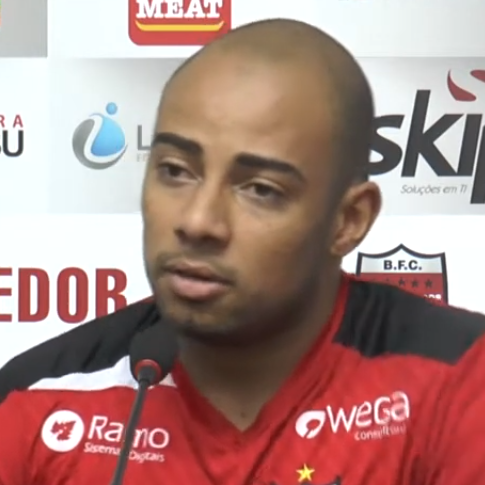
- João Lucas in 2017

Personal information
- Full name: João Lucas Firmino Pinto
- Date of birth: 15 September 1993 (age 33)
- Place of birth: Campinas, Brazil
- Height: 1.86 m (6 ft 1 in)
- Position: Goalkeeper

Team information
- Current team: São José-SP
- Number: 22

Youth career
- 2008–2013: Botafogo-SP

Senior career*
Years	Team	Apps	(Gls)
2012–2018	Botafogo-SP	9	(0)
2019	Água Santa	2	(0)
2020	Portuguesa Santista	11	(0)
2020	Tupi	5	(0)
2021	Lagarto	5	(0)
2022	Joinville	11	(0)
2022	Tupi	9	(0)
2023	São Caetano	11	(0)
2023	Metropolitano	3	(0)
2024	XV de Piracicaba	0	(0)
2024–2025	CRAC	1	(0)
2025	Comercial-SP	0	(0)
2026–	São José-SP	0	(0)
- * Club domestic league appearances and goals as of 21:14, 16 November 2025 (UTC)

João Lucas Firmino Pinto (born 15 September 1993), known as João Lucas, is a Brazilian footballer who plays as a goalkeeper for São José-SP.

== Career ==
Born in Campinas, São Paulo, João Lucas joined Botafogo-SP's youth sides in 2008, aged 14. He made his first team debut in the 2012 Copa Paulista, and subsequently became a backup option in the main squad.

João Lucas only managed to feature in some matches during the 2018 season, but departed the club on 14 November of that year. He later moved to Água Santa, where he was also a second-choice, and was announced at Portuguesa Santista on 11 December 2019.

After ending the 2020 campaign at Tupi, João Lucas signed for Lagarto on 29 January 2021. He later moved to Joinville on 7 December, before returning to Tupi on 20 April 2022.

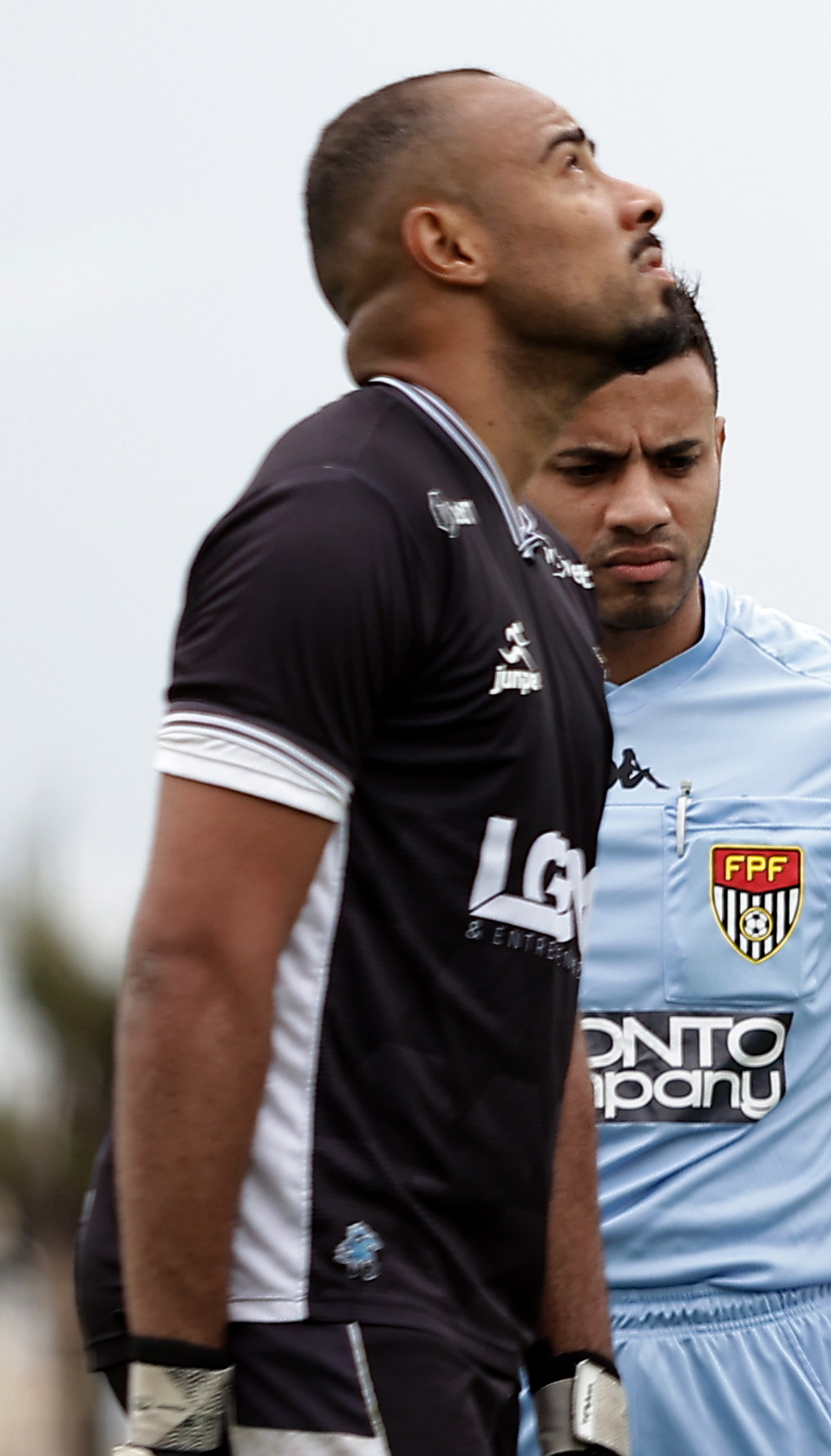
João Lucas playing for São Caetano in 2023

On 18 May 2023, after a short period at São Caetano, João Lucas agreed to a deal with Metropolitano. On 4 December, he was announced at XV de Piracicaba, but did not play for the side and subsequently joined CRAC.

On 21 May 2025, João Lucas signed for Comercial-SP. On 10 November, he was announced as the new signing of São José-SP for the upcoming season.

== Career statistics ==
As of 16 November 2025

Club	Season	League			State League		Cup		Continental		Other		Total	
Club	Season	Division	Apps	Goals	Apps	Goals	Apps	Goals	Apps	Goals	Apps	Goals	Apps	Goals
Botafogo-SP	2012	Paulista	—		—		—		—		2 (Note: Appearance(s) in Copa Paulista)	0	2	0
Botafogo-SP	2013	Série D	0	0	0	0	—		—		—		0	0
Botafogo-SP	2014	Paulista	—		0	0	—		—		23	0	23	0
Botafogo-SP	2015	Série D	0	0	0	0	—		—		—		0	0
Botafogo-SP	2016	Série C	0	0	0	0	—		—		—		0	0
Botafogo-SP	2017	Série C	0	0	0	0	—		—		—		0	0
Botafogo-SP	2018	Série C	7	0	2	0	—		—		—		9	0
Botafogo-SP	Total		7	0	2	0	—		—		25	0	34	0
Água Santa	2019	Paulista A2	—		2	0	—		—		—		2	0
Portuguesa Santista	2020	Paulista A2	—		11	0	—		—		—		11	0
Tupi	2020	Mineiro Módulo II	—		5	0	—		—		—		5	0
Lagarto	2021	Sergipano	—		5	0	—		—		—		5	0
Joinville	2022	Catarinense	—		11	0	—		—		—		11	0
Tupi	2022	Mineiro Módulo II	—		9	0	—		—		—		9	0
São Caetano	2023	Paulista A2	—		11	0	—		—		—		11	0
Metropolitano	2023	Catarinense Série B	—		3	0	—		—		—		3	0
XV de Piracicaba	2024	Paulista A2	—		0	0	—		—		—		0	0
CRAC	2024	Série D	1	0	—		—		—		—		1	0
CRAC	2025	Goiano	—		0	0	—		—		—		0	0
CRAC	Total		1	0	0	0	—		—		—		1	0
Comercial-SP	2025	Paulista A3	—		—		—		—		14	0	14	0
São José-SP	2026	Paulista A2	—		0	0	—		—		—		0	0
Career total			8	0	49	0	0	0	0	0	39	0	96	0
