= Sud Mennucci, São Paulo =

Sud Mennucci
- Municipality
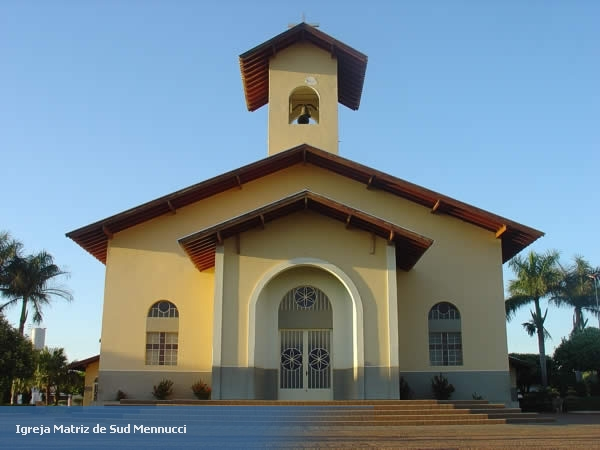

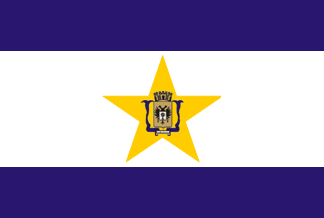
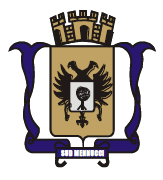
- Flag Coat of arms

- Location in São Paulo state

- Location in Brazil
- Coordinates: 20°41′27″S 50°55′26″W
- Country: Brazil
- Region: Southeast
- State: São Paulo

Area
  - Total: 595 km^{2} (230 sq mi)

Population (2020)
  - Total: 7,728
  - Density: 13.0/km^{2} (33.6/sq mi)
- Time zone: UTC−3 (BRT)

Sud Mennucci is a municipality in the state of São Paulo, Brazil. The population is 7,728 (2020 est.) in an area of 595 km^{2}. Altitude is 386 m.

== Media ==
In telecommunications, the city was served by Companhia de Telecomunicações do Estado de São Paulo until 1975, when it began to be served by Telecomunicações de São Paulo. In July 1998, this company was acquired by Telefónica, which adopted the Vivo brand in 2012.

The company is currently an operator of cell phones, fixed lines, internet (fiber optics/4G) and television (satellite and cable).

The municipality became widely known as a pioneer in the free access of its population to a Wi-Fi municipal wireless network.

== See also ==
- List of municipalities in São Paulo
- Interior of São Paulo
