= Souto (Santa Maria da Feira) =

Former civil parish in Portugal

- Civil parish
- Location in Portugal
- Coordinates: 40.888°N 8.561°W
- Country: Portugal
- Region: Norte
- Metropolitan area: Porto
- District: Aveiro
- Municipality: Santa Maria da Feira
- Disbanded: 2013

Area
  - Total: 9.40 km^{2} (3.63 sq mi)

Population (2001)
  - Total: 4,835
  - Density: 510/km^{2} (1,300/sq mi)
- Time zone: UTC+00:00 (WET)
  - Summer (DST): UTC+01:00 (WEST)

Souto is a former civil parish in the municipality of Santa Maria da Feira, Portugal. In 2013, the parish merged into the new parish São Miguel do Souto e Mosteirô. It has a population of 4,835 inhabitants and a total area of 9.40 km^{2}.
