= Leandro Alves (footballer, born 1999) =

Brazilian footballer

Personal information
- Full name: Leandro da Silva Alves
- Date of birth: 16 January 1999 (age 27)
- Place of birth: Penápolis, Brazil
- Height: 1.74 m (5 ft 9 in)
- Position: Winger

Team information
- Current team: Mafra
- Number: 11

Senior career*
Years	Team	Apps	(Gls)
2019–2022	Rio Ave	5	(0)
2020–2021	Rio Ave B	11	(2)
2022–2025	União Santarém	41	(7)
2025	Qingdao Red Lions	26	(5)
2026	Athletic	5	(0)
2026–	Mafra	5	(0)
- * Club domestic league appearances and goals as of 12 September 2026

Leandro da Silva Alves (born 16 January 1999) is a Brazilian footballer who plays as a winger for Portuguese Liga 3 club Mafra.

== Club career ==
Alves made his professional debut with Rio Ave F.C. in a 0-0 Primeira Liga tie with Belenenses SAD on 29 February 2020.
