= Cryzan =

Brazilian footballer (born 1996)

Personal information
- Full name: Cryzan da Cruz Queiroz Barcelos
- Date of birth: 7 July 1996 (age 30)
- Place of birth: Sud Mennucci, Brazil
- Height: 1.90 m (6 ft 3 in)
- Position: Forward

Team information
- Current team: Shandong Taishan
- Number: 9

Youth career
- Grêmio Barueri
- 2013–2015: Atlético Paranaense

Senior career*
Years	Team	Apps	(Gls)
2015–2019	Athletico Paranaense	46	(8)
2016	→ Oeste (loan)	27	(3)
2017–2018	→ Cercle Brugge (loan)	26	(6)
2018–2019	→ Al Batin (loan)	28	(6)
2019	→ Atlético Goianiense (loan)	0	(0)
2020–2022	Santa Clara	58	(14)
2022–	Shandong Taishan	128	(79)
- * Club domestic league appearances and goals as of 8 November 2026

Cryzan da Cruz Queiroz Barcelos (born 7 July 1996), simply known as Cryzan, is a Brazilian professional footballer who plays as a forward for Chinese Super League club Shandong Taishan.

== Club career ==
=== Grêmio Barueri ===
Born in Sud Mennucci, São Paulo, Cryzan was part of Grêmio Barueri youth setup.

=== Atlético Paranaense ===
In February 2013, Cryzan joined top tier club Atlético Paranaense's youth setup . He would be promoted to their under-23s in January 2015. This would be followed by him being graduating to the senior team and then signing a three-year deal with the club. He would go on to make his debut on 1 February 2015, in a Campeonato Paranaense game against Cascavel that ended in a 0-0 draw. His debut goal would soon follow in the same competition on 5 February 2015 against Rio Branco in a 3-1 defeat. After scoring five goals in Campeonato Paranaense state league, Cryzan made his debut for the Série A national league on 19 July 2015, starting in a 1–0 home win against Chapecoense.

In the following season he would gain his first piece of silverware as part of the team that won the 2016 Campeonato Paranaense state league.

==== Oeste (loan) ====
To gain more playing time was loaned out to second tier club Oeste where he quickly established himself as an integral member of their team that helped them avoid relegation at the end of the Campeonato Brasileiro Série B league season.

==== Cercle Brugge (loan) ====
Another loan would happen, this time he would be going abroad to Belgian team Cercle Brugge where once again he would be an integral member of their team that went on to win the division and promotion to the top tier at the end of the 2017–18 Belgian First Division B season.

==== Al-Batin (loan) ====
On 22 August 2018, Cryzan joined Saudi club Al-Batin on loan for an undisclosed fee.

==== Atlético Goianiense ====
In 2019, Cryzan joined Atlético Goianiense on loan.

=== Santa Clara ===
Cryzan would permanently move abroad to top tier Portuguese club C.D. Santa Clara in 2020.

=== Shandong Taishan ===
On 15 April 2022, Cryzan joined top tier Chinese football club Shandong Taishan for the start of the 2022 Chinese Super League campaign. He made his debut for the club on 3 June 2022 in a league game against Zhejiang Professional that ended in a 1–0 victory. This would be followed by his first goal for the club, which was scored in a league game on 28 June 2022 against Henan Songshan Longmen in a 2–0 victory. He would establish himself as a regular member of the teams attack that went on to the win the 2022 Chinese FA Cup with them. On 28 November 2023, Cryzan scored a hat-trick during the 2023–24 AFC Champions League group stage match against Philippines club, Kaya–Iloilo in a 6–1 huge win.

== Career statistics ==
As of match played 8 November 2026

Appearances and goals by club, season and competition
Club	Season	League			State League		Cup		League Cup		Continental		Other		Total	
Club	Season	Division	Apps	Goals	Apps	Goals	Apps	Goals	Apps	Goals	Apps	Goals	Apps	Goals	Apps	Goals
Athletico Paranaense	2015	Série A	14	0	9 (Note: Appearances in the Campeonato Paranaense)	5	2	0	—		3	0	—		28	5
Athletico Paranaense	2016	Série A	0	0	7	1	2	0	—		0	0	2 (Note: Appearances in the Primeira Liga)	0	11	1
Athletico Paranaense	2017	Série A	0	0	13	2	0	0	—		1	0	—		14	2
Athletico Paranaense	2018	Série A	1	0	0	0	0	0	—		0	0	—		1	0
Athletico Paranaense	Total		15	0	29	8	4	0	—		4	0	2	0	54	8
Oeste (Loan)	2016	Série B	27	3	0 (Note: Appearances in the Campeonato Paulista)	0	0	0	—		—		—		27	3
Cercle Brugge (Loan)	2017–18	Challenger Pro League	26	6	—		2	0	—		—		—		28	6
Al Batin (Loan)	2018–19	Saudi Professional League	28	6	—		3	1	—		—		—		31	7
Atlético Goianiense (Loan)	2019	Série B	0	0	0 (Note: Appearances in the Campeonato Goiano)	0	0	0	—		—		—		0	0
Santa Clara	2019–20	Primeira Liga	13	3	—		0	0	0	0	—		—		13	3
Santa Clara	2020–21	Primeira Liga	24	4	—		2	1	0	0	—		—		26	5
Santa Clara	2021–22	Primeira Liga	21	7	—		1	0	2	0	4	0	—		28	7
Santa Clara	Total		58	14	—		3	1	2	0	4	0	—		67	15
Shandong Taishan	2022	Chinese Super League	31	25	—		1	0	—		0	0	—		32	25
Shandong Taishan	2023	Chinese Super League	22	12	—		5	5	—		6	6	0	0	33	23
Shandong Taishan	2024	Chinese Super League	24	11	—		3	1	—		7	4	—		34	16
Shandong Taishan	2025	Chinese Super League	27	11	—		2	2	—		1	1	—		30	14
Shandong Taishan	2026	Chinese Super League	24	20	—		2	1	—		—		—		26	21
Shandong Taishan	Total		128	79	—		13	9	—		14	11	0	0	154	99
Career total			282	108	29	8	25	11	2	0	22	11	2	0	354	139

== 2Honours ==
Athletico Paranaense

- Campeonato Paranaense: 2016

Cercle Brugge

- Challenger Pro League: 2017–18

Shandong Taishan

- Chinese FA Cup: 2022
