= Rodolfo Cardoso (footballer, born 1997) =

Portuguese footballer

Personal information
- Full name: Rodolfo Amaral Furtado Cardoso
- Date of birth: 13 October 1997 (age 29)
- Place of birth: Ribeira Grande, Portugal
- Height: 1.85 m (6 ft 1 in)
- Position: Goalkeeper

Team information
- Current team: Fontinhas
- Number: 97

Youth career
- 2006–2010: Rabo de Peixe
- 2010–2016: Santa Clara

Senior career*
Years	Team	Apps	(Gls)
2016–	Santa Clara	3	(0)
2017	→ Águia CD (loan)	0	(0)
2018–2019	→ Águia CD (loan)	10	(0)
2019–2020	→ Louletano (loan)	0	(0)
2022–	→ Fontinhas (loan)	4	(0)
- * Club domestic league appearances and goals as of 11 February 2023

Rodolfo Amaral Furtado Cardoso (born 13 October 1997) is a Portuguese footballer who plays for Fontinhas on loan from Santa Clara, as a goalkeeper.

== Career ==
Born in Ribeira Grande in the Azores, Cardoso began his career at local C.D. Santa Clara, being loaned to amateurs Águia CD before being an unused substitute in March 2016. He made his professional debut on 12 May 2018 on the final day of the LigaPro season, as a last-minute replacement for Serginho.

Cardoso spent the first half of 2019–20 on loan at Louletano D.C. in the Campeonato de Portugal. His only appearance for the Algarvean team was on 8 September, in a 1–0 win over F.C. Ferreiras in the first round of the Taça de Portugal.

On 14 July 2020, Cardoso was given his Primeira Liga debut in a 3–0 home win over C.D. Aves, again in the last moments in place of André Ferreira. In September, his contract was extended for three more years.
