= Carlos (footballer, born 1995) =

Brazilian footballer

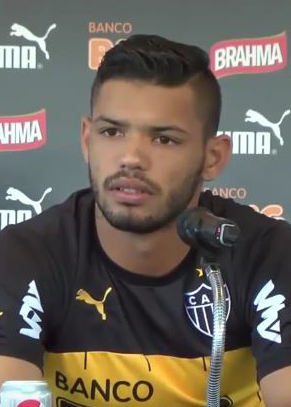

Personal information
- Full name: Carlos Alberto Carvalho da Silva Júnior
- Date of birth: 15 August 1995 (age 31)
- Place of birth: Santaluz, Bahia, Brazil
- Height: 1.76 m (5 ft 9 in)
- Position: Forward

Team information
- Current team: Al-Shabab
- Number: 13

Youth career
- 2009–2014: Atlético Mineiro

Senior career*
Years	Team	Apps	(Gls)
2013–2018	Atlético Mineiro	87	(15)
2017	→ Internacional (loan)	26	(3)
2018	→ Paraná (loan)	19	(1)
2019	Rio Ave	7	(1)
2019–2021	Santa Clara	68	(23)
2021–2026	Al-Shabab	86	(35)
2024–2025	→ Neom (loan)	28	(15)
- * Club domestic league appearances and goals as of 26 August 2026, 14:51 (UTC)

Carlos Alberto Carvalho da Silva Júnior (born 15 August 1995), simply known as Carlos, is a Brazilian footballer who plays for Al-Shabab as a forward.

== Club career ==
=== Atlético Mineiro ===
Born in Santa Luz, Bahia, Carlos joined Atlético Mineiro's youth setup in 2009, aged 14. On 10 August 2013 he made his professional debut, replacing Rosinei in a 0–0 away draw against Náutico for the Série A championship.

In January 2014 Carlos was definitely promoted to the main squad. He scored his first goal on 1 March, netting the last of a 4–1 Campeonato Mineiro away routing over Villa Nova.

Carlos also appeared regularly during the year's national league, scoring a brace in a 3–2 away win against fierce rivals Cruzeiro on 21 September.

=== Internacional ===
On 2 February 2017, Carlos joined Internacional on a season-long loan.

=== Paraná ===
On 17 April 2018, Carlos was once again loaned by Atlético, this time to Paraná, reuniting with his former manager at Atlético's youth team Rogério Micale.

On 29 December 2018 it was announced that Carlos had signed with Vitória F.C. in Portugal. His contract with Atlético was terminated, but the club maintained a percentage in case of future sale of the player. Carlos moved to Setúbal, but the transfer was actually never finalized due to bureaucratic problems.

=== Al Shabab ===
On 20 August 2021, Carlos joined Al-Shabab on a three-year contract.

=== Neom ===
On 2 September 2024, Carlos joined Saudi First Division League club Neom on loan.

== Career statistics ==
As of the end 2024–25 season.

Appearances and goals by club, season and competition
Club	Season	League			State League		Cup		League Cup		Continental		Other		Total	
Club	Season	Division	Apps	Goals	Apps	Goals	Apps	Goals	Apps	Goals	Apps	Goals	Apps	Goals	Apps	Goals
Atlético Mineiro	2013	Série A	1	0	—		—		—		—		—		1	0
Atlético Mineiro	2014	Série A	22	5	7	2	7	1	—		—		—		36	8
Atlético Mineiro	2015	Série A	22	3	14	3	0	0	—		5	1	—		41	7
Atlético Mineiro	2016	Série A	16	2	1	0	1	0	—		3	3	—		21	5
Atlético Mineiro	2017	Série A	—		0	0	—		—		—		0	0	0	0
Atlético Mineiro	2018	Série A	—		4	0	0	0	—		—		—		4	0
Atlético Mineiro	Total		61	10	26	5	8	1	0	0	8	4	0	0	103	20
Internacional (loan)	2017	Série B	16	3	9	0	5	3	—		—		1	0	31	6
Paraná (loan)	2018	Série A	19	1	—		—		—		—		—		19	1
Rio Ave	2018–19	Primeira Liga	7	1	—		—		—		—		—		7	1
Santa Clara	2019–20	Primeira Liga	34	7	—		3	2	2	0	—		—		39	9
Santa Clara	2020–21	Primeira Liga	32	14	—		4	1	—		—		—		36	15
Santa Clara	2021–22	Primeira Liga	2	2	—		—		1	0	5	5	—		8	7
Santa Clara	Total		68	23	0	0	7	3	3	0	5	5	0	0	83	31
Al Shabab	2021–22	SPL	23	13	—		3	4	—		4	5	—		30	22
Al Shabab	2022–23	SPL	22	12	—		1	0	—		1	0	—		24	12
Al Shabab	2023–24	SPL	24	6	—		3	1	—		—		—		27	7
Al Shabab	Total		69	31	0	0	7	5	0	0	5	5	0	0	81	41
Neom SC	2024–25	FDL	25	16	—		0	0	—		0	0	—		25	16
Neom SC	Total		25	16	0	0	0	0	0	0	0	0	0	0	25	16
Career total			264	85	35	5	27	12	3	0	18	14	1	0	348	116

== International career ==
On 27 November 2014, Carlos was preselected by the Brazil under-20s for the 2015 South American Youth Football Championship, hosted in Uruguay.

== Honours ==
Atlético Mineiro

- Copa do Brasil: 2014
- Campeonato Mineiro: 2015

Neom SC

- Saudi First Division League: 2024–25

Individual

- Primeira Liga Team of the Year: 2020–21
- King Cup Top scorer: 2021–22
