= Marco Pereira (footballer) =

Portuguese footballer

Marco
Personal information
- Full name: Marco André Rocha Pereira
- Date of birth: 12 January 1987 (age 39)
- Place of birth: Castelo de Paiva, Portugal
- Height: 1.84 m (6 ft 0 in)
- Position: Goalkeeper

Team information
- Current team: Florgrade

Youth career
- 2000–2001: CCR São Martinho
- 2002: Arrifanense
- 2002: CCR São Martinho
- 2003–2006: Boavista

Senior career*
Years	Team	Apps	(Gls)
2006–2007	Boavista	0	(0)
2006–2007	→ Trofense (loan)	8	(0)
2007–2012	Trofense	63	(0)
2012–2014	Feirense	42	(0)
2014–2017	Freamunde	114	(0)
2017–2024	Santa Clara	140	(0)
2024–2025	Sanjoanense	17	(0)
2025–	Florgrade	5	(0)

International career
2004	Portugal U17	1	(0)
2006	Portugal U19	1	(0)
- * Club domestic league appearances and goals as of 14:34, 19 January 2026 (UTC)

Marco André Rocha Pereira (born 12 January 1987), known simply as Marco, is a Portuguese professional footballer who plays as a goalkeeper for Florgrade.

== Club career ==
Born in Castelo de Paiva, Aveiro District, Marco came through the ranks at Boavista F.C. before moving to C.D. Trofense, initially on loan. In the 2008–09 season, the club's first in the Primeira Liga, he played 12 games and Paulo Lopes 18; his debut was a 1–0 away win against Vitória S.C. on 22 February 2009.

Marco remained playing regularly in the Segunda Liga over the ensuing seasons, for Trofense, C.D. Feirense and S.C. Freamunde. On 24 May 2017, he joined C.D. Santa Clara, being second-choice to Serginho as the Azoreans finished runners-up to C.D. Nacional. He subsequently replaced the veteran as starting goalkeeper, and in June 2021 he was rewarded for his role in a best-ever sixth-place finish with three more seasons to his contract.

Aged 34, Marco made his European debut on 22 July 2021 in the first leg of the second qualifying round of the new UEFA Europa Conference League. He kept a clean sheet in a 3–0 win away to KF Shkupi in North Macedonia, as well as the 2–0 victory in the second leg a week later.

Marco spent the vast majority of the 2022–23 campaign on the sidelines, due to a knee injury. Shortly after recovering, he relapsed and had to undergo surgery again.

On 30 June 2024, Marco signed for Liga 3 side A.D. Sanjoanense.
