= Mikel Villanueva =

Venezuelan footballer (born 1993)

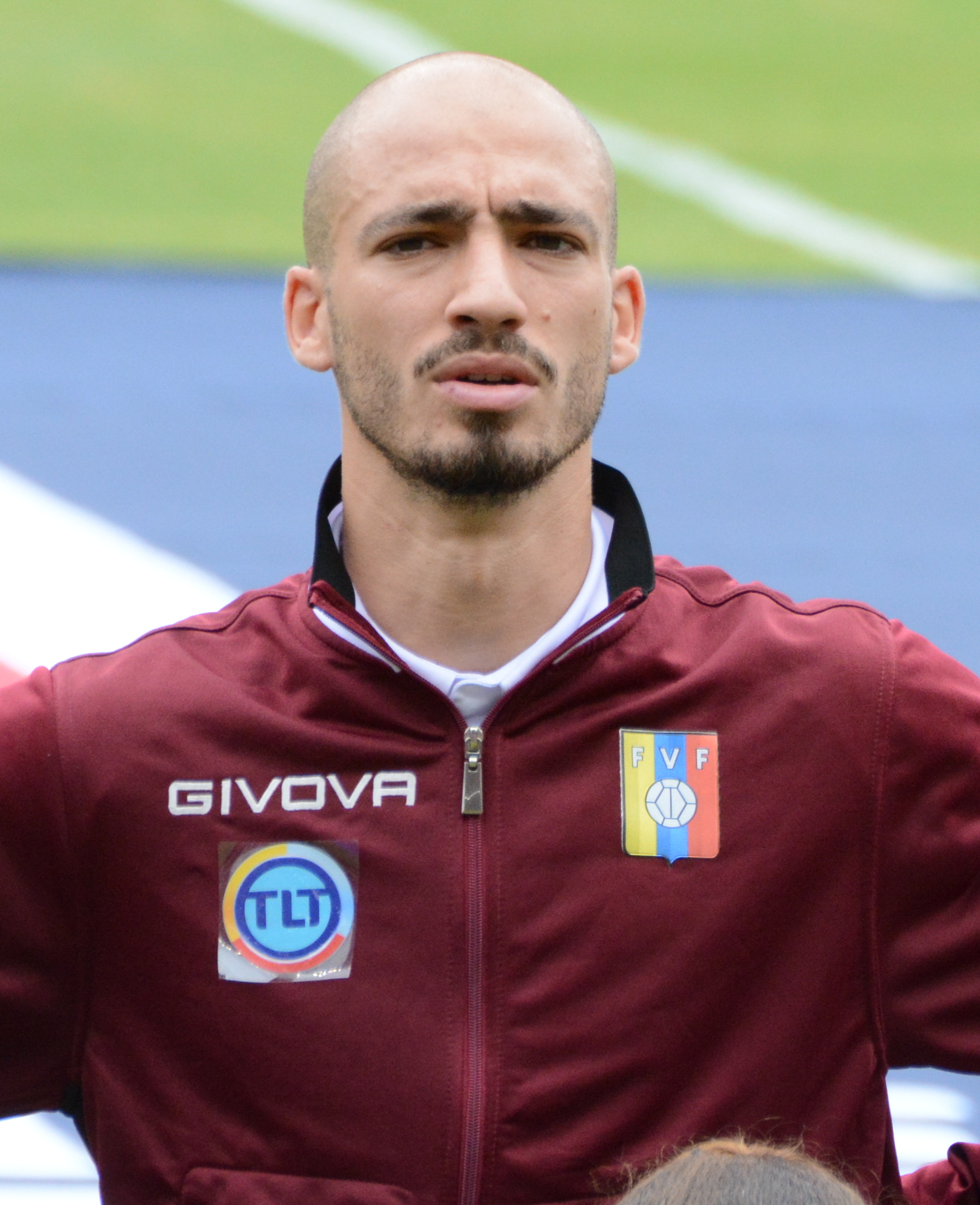
- Villanueva with Venezuela in 2019

Personal information
- Full name: Mikel Villanueva Álvarez
- Date of birth: 14 April 1993 (age 33)
- Place of birth: San Cristóbal, Venezuela
- Height: 1.90 m (6 ft 3 in)
- Position: Centre-back

Youth career
- Deportivo Táchira

Senior career*
Years	Team	Apps	(Gls)
2012–2014	Deportivo Táchira	5	(0)
2014–2016	ACD Lara	20	(4)
2015–2016	→ Málaga B (loan)	31	(3)
2016–2020	Málaga	31	(1)
2017–2018	→ Cádiz (loan)	13	(0)
2018	→ Reus (loan)	12	(0)
2019	→ Gimnàstic (loan)	17	(0)
2020–2022	Santa Clara	61	(2)
2022–2025	Vitória Guimarães	69	(1)
2025–2026	Al-Fayha	30	(1)

International career^{‡}
2016–2022	Venezuela	31	(2)
- * Club domestic league appearances and goals as of 10 January 2026 ‡ National team caps and goals as of 01:47, 15 October 2026 (UTC)

Mikel Villanueva Álvarez (born 14 April 1993) is a Venezuelan professional footballer who plays as a centre-back.

He spent several years at Málaga, where he made 15 La Liga appearances and was mainly loaned to Segunda División clubs. He also played in the Portuguese Primeira Liga for Santa Clara and Vitória Guimarães.

A full international for Venezuela since 2016, Villanueva represented the nation at three Copa América tournaments.

== Club career ==
=== Early career ===
Born in San Cristóbal, Táchira, Villanueva was a Deportivo Táchira youth graduate. On 3 March 2013 he made his professional debut, starting in a 0–1 away loss against Estudiantes de Mérida.

After being rarely used, Villanueva moved to fellow Primera División team ACD Lara in 2014. He scored his first professional goal on 25 January 2015, netting the game's only in an away win against Carabobo FC.

On 22 February 2015, Villanueva scored a brace in a 3–1 home win against Trujillanos FC. He finished the campaign with 20 appearances and four goals.

=== Málaga ===
On 4 July 2015 Villanueva joined Málaga CF, being assigned to the reserves in Tercera División. On 3 May 2016, he was bought outright by the club, signing a permanent three-year deal and being promoted to the main squad in La Liga.

Villanueva made his debut in the main category of Spanish football on 16 October 2016, starting in a 1–1 away draw against Deportivo Alavés. The following 10 August he renewed his contract until 2020, and was immediately loaned to Segunda División club Cádiz CF for one year.

On 24 July 2018, Villanueva joined fellow second division side CF Reus Deportiu, on a season-long loan. On 28 December, he was one of the five players who left the club due to unpaid wages.

On 9 January 2019, Villanueva moved to Gimnàstic de Tarragona still in the second tier, on loan until June. Back at his parent club, he scored his only goal in Spanish football on 20 October to open a 2–0 win at Deportivo de La Coruña.

=== Santa Clara ===
On 31 August 2020, Villanueva signed a two-year deal at C.D. Santa Clara in the Portuguese Primeira Liga. He missed only five games in his first season as the club from the Azores came sixth, and scored a fourth-minute opener in a 5–1 home win over C.D. Nacional on 11 April.

Villanueva took part in the first continental campaign of his career in the 2021–22 UEFA Europa Conference League. On 29 July 2021, he scored in a 2–0 home win (5–0 aggregate) over KF Shkupi of North Macedonia in the second leg of the second qualifying round.

=== Vitória Guimarães ===
On 27 June 2022, at the end of his Santa Clara contract, Villanueva moved to Vitória de Guimarães in the same league on a three-year deal.

=== Al-Fayha ===
On 10 September 2025, Villanueva joined Saudi Pro League side Al-Fayha on a one-year deal.

== International career ==
On 20 January 2016, Villanueva was called up to the Venezuela national team for a friendly against Costa Rica. He made his full international debut on 2 February, starting in the 1–0 win in Barinas.

Villanueva scored his first international goal on 24 March 2016 in 2018 FIFA World Cup qualification, netting the second in a 2–2 away draw against Peru following an assist from Málaga teammate Juanpi. He was named in the Vinotinto's squad for the year's Copa América Centenario in the United States, but did not play.

Villanueva was called up for the 2019 Copa América in Brazil. He played the first two group games as the team reached the quarter-finals, goalless draws against Peru and the hosts, but was then ruled out with fever.

At the 2021 Copa América, in the same country as before, Venezuela were the one team eliminated from five in Group B. Villanueva played only in the last game, a 1–0 loss to Peru at the Estádio Nacional Mané Garrincha.

=== International goals ===
No.	Date	Venue	Opponent	Score	Result	Competition	Ref.
1.	24 March 2016	Estadio Nacional de Lima, Lima, Peru	Peru	2–1	2–2	2018 World Cup qualification	
2.	23 March 2017	Estadio Monumental de Maturín, Maturín, Venezuela	Peru	1–0	2–2	2018 FIFA World Cup qualification	

== Honours ==
Venezuela

- Kirin Cup: 2019
