= Gustavo Viera (Uruguayan footballer) =

Uruguayan footballer (born 2000)

Personal information
- Full name: Gustavo Daniel Viera Moreira
- Date of birth: 21 October 2000 (age 26)
- Place of birth: Montevideo, Uruguay
- Height: 1.75 m (5 ft 9 in)
- Position: Forward

Team information
- Current team: Boston River
- Number: 19

Youth career
- Liverpool MVD

Senior career*
Years	Team	Apps	(Gls)
2017–2020	Liverpool MVD	13	(0)
2020–2024	Santa Clara	1	(0)
2021–2024	→ Fénix (loan)	33	(4)
2024–	Boston River	26	(2)

International career
2014–2015	Uruguay U15	15	(3)
2016–2017	Uruguay U17	14	(2)
- * Club domestic league appearances and goals as of 1 October 2025

Gustavo Daniel Viera Moreira, known as Gustavo Viera (born 21 October 2000) is a Uruguayan footballer who plays as forward for Boston River.

== Club career ==
On 27 August 2021, Santa Clara announced that Viera joined Fénix on loan.

== Career statistics ==
As of 5 November 2019.

Club	Season	League			Cup		Continental		Other		Total	
Club	Season	Division	Apps	Goals	Apps	Goals	Apps	Goals	Apps	Goals	Apps	Goals
Liverpool Montevideo	2017	Primera División	8	0	–		2 (Note: Appearance(s) in Copa Sudamericana.)	0	–		10	0
Liverpool Montevideo	2018	Primera División	1	0	–		–		–		1	0
Liverpool Montevideo	2019	Primera División	2	0	–		0	0	–		2	0
Career total			11	0	0	0	2	0	0	0	13	0
