= João Lucas (footballer, born 1996) =

Portuguese footballer

Personal information
- Full name: João Paulo Lázaro Lucas
- Date of birth: 15 January 1996 (age 30)
- Place of birth: Almada, Portugal
- Height: 1.80 m (5 ft 11 in)
- Position: Left-back

Team information
- Current team: Belenenses
- Number: 15

Youth career
- 2004–2006: Ginásio Corroios
- 2006–2008: Sporting CP
- 2008–2009: Belenenses
- 2009–2011: Ginásio Corroios
- 2011–2014: Belenenses
- 2014–2015: Benfica

Senior career*
Years	Team	Apps	(Gls)
2015–2016	Benfica Castelo Branco	32	(1)
2016–2018	Leixões	38	(0)
2018–2021	Santa Clara	32	(0)
2021–2022	Académica de Coimbra	10	(0)
2022–2023	Paris 13 Atletico	8	(0)
2023	Amora	8	(0)
2023–2024	Alverca	20	(1)
2024–2025	Anadia	20	(0)
2025–	Belenenses	9	(0)
- * Club domestic league appearances and goals as of 7 May 2026

João Paulo Lázaro Lucas (born 15 January 1996) is a Portuguese professional footballer who plays as a left-back for Liga 3 club Belenenses.

== Club career ==
On 31 July 2016, Lucas made his professional debut with Leixões in a 2016–17 Taça da Liga match against Cova da Piedade.

On 29 June 2021, Lucas joined Académica de Coimbra. On 26 June 2022, he signed for French club Paris 13 Atletico.

In January 2023, Lucas returned to Portugal and signed with Amora.
