= Mansur (footballer) =

Brazilian footballer (born 1993)

Personal information
- Full name: Joéliton Lima Santos
- Date of birth: 17 April 1993 (age 33)
- Place of birth: Laranjeiras, Brazil
- Height: 1.82 m (6 ft 0 in)
- Positions: Left-back; centre-back

Team information
- Current team: Atromitos
- Number: 70

Youth career
- 2004–2005: Real Salvador
- 2006–2012: Bahia

Senior career*
Years	Team	Apps	(Gls)
2012	Bahia	0	(0)
2012–2015	Vitória	34	(0)
2015	→ Atlético Mineiro (loan)	1	(0)
2016–2020	Atlético Mineiro	0	(0)
2016–2017	→ Sport Recife (loan)	1	(0)
2018	→ Paraná (loan)	17	(0)
2019	→ São Bento (loan)	24	(1)
2020–2022	Santa Clara	52	(0)
2023–2024	Estrela da Amadora	20	(2)
2024–	Atromitos	50	(6)

International career
2013	Brazil U20	4	(0)
- * Club domestic league appearances and goals as of 15 May 2026

Joéliton Lima Santos (born 17 April 1993), commonly known as Mansur, is a Brazilian professional footballer who plays as a left-back or a centre-back for Greek Super League club Atromitos.

== Club career ==
Born in Laranjeiras, Mansur started his career with the youth academy of Bahia and made his first team debut in 2011. However, he moved to Vitória on 10 January 2012, after his former club failed to clear his fees. On 10 July, he scored his first goal for the club in a 4–3 victory against Paraná. However, he faced stiff competition after the arrival of Gilson on loan from Cruzeiro. On 25 May 2013, he made his Série A debut in a 2–2 draw against Internacional.

In February 2014, Vitória received an offer from Atlético Mineiro to secure Mansur's services. On 8 August 2015, he was loaned out to Atlético Mineiro on a contract running till January 2016. On 3 September, he made his debut in a 1–0 defeat against Atlético Paranaense. On 19 January 2016, he signed permanently with the club, after agreeing to a four-year deal.

After being rarely used in Atlético Mineiro, Mansur joined Sport on 26 June 2016 to get more opportunities and signed a contract which would keep him at the club till May 2017. However, he was sparingly used and made 13 appearances. On 30 January 2018, he joined newly promoted side Paraná on a loan deal until the end of the season.

== International career ==
Mansur played for Brazil under-20 team in 2013, representing the team in the 2013 Copa Sudamericana under-20.

== Career statistics ==
As of match played on 21 October 2018

Appearances and goals by club, season and competition
Club	Season	National league			State league		Cup		Continental		Total	
Club	Season	Division	Apps	Goals	Apps	Goals	Apps	Goals	Apps	Goals	Apps	Goals
Bahia	2011	Série A	0	0	1	0	0	0	—		1	0
Vitória	2012	Série B	12	1	8	0	2	0	—		22	1
Vitória	2013	Série A	3	0	12	1	10	0	—		25	1
Vitória	2014	Série A	14	0	9	0	2	0	4 (Note: Appearances in Copa Sudamericana)	0	29	0
Vitória	2015	Série B	5	0	3	0	10	0	—		18	0
Vitória	Total		34	0	32	1	24	0	4	0	94	1
Atlético Mineiro (loan)	2015	Série A	1	0	0	0	0	0	—		1	0
Atlético Mineiro	2016	Série A	0	0	2	0	1	0	0	0	3	0
Atlético Mineiro	2017	Série A	0	0	0	0	1	0	—		1	0
Atlético Mineiro	Total		0	0	2	0	2	0	—		4	0
Sport (loan)	2017	Série A	1	0	4	0	7	0	—		12	0
Paraná (loan)	2018	Série A	14	0	8	1	2	0	—		24	1
Career total			39	1	46	2	35	0	4	0	124	3

== Honours ==
Vitória

- Campeonato Baiano: 2013

Sport

- Campeonato Pernambucano: 2017

Individual

- Liga Portugal 2 Defender of the Month: April 2023
