= João Afonso (footballer, born 1990) =

Portuguese footballer

Personal information
- Full name: João Ricardo da Silva Afonso
- Date of birth: 28 May 1990 (age 36)
- Place of birth: Castelo Branco, Portugal
- Height: 1.88 m (6 ft 2 in)
- Position: Centre-back

Team information
- Current team: Tondela
- Number: 5

Youth career
- 1999–2004: Bairro Valongo
- 2004–2007: Desportivo Castelo Branco
- 2007–2008: Benfica Castelo Branco

Senior career*
Years	Team	Apps	(Gls)
2008–2014	Benfica Castelo Branco	150	(6)
2014–2019	Vitória Guimarães	60	(3)
2016	Vitória Guimarães B	6	(0)
2016–2017	→ Estoril (loan)	27	(0)
2017–2018	→ Córdoba (loan)	21	(0)
2019–2022	Santa Clara	74	(2)
2022–2024	Torreense	62	(4)
2024–	Tondela	46	(0)
- * Club domestic league appearances and goals as of 19:05, 16 May 2026 (UTC)

João Ricardo da Silva Afonso (born 28 May 1990) is a Portuguese professional footballer who plays for Liga Portugal 2 club Tondela as a central defender.

== Club career ==
=== Vitória Guimarães ===
Born in Castelo Branco, Afonso started playing with local Sport Benfica e Castelo Branco, after joining its youth system in 2007. He went on to spend several seasons with the club in the lower leagues, also being awarded team captaincy.

On 20 June 2014, after being linked with C.S. Marítimo and Gil Vicente FC, Afonso signed with fellow Primeira Liga side Vitória de Guimarães. He made his debut as a professional on 22 August of that year, replacing the injured Moreno midway through the first half of an eventual 3–0 home win against F.C. Penafiel.

Afonso joined G.D. Estoril Praia also from the top division on 31 August 2016, in a season-long loan deal. The following 9 July, still owned by Vitória, he moved abroad after agreeing to a one-year loan with Córdoba CF in the Spanish Segunda División.

=== Santa Clara ===
In late June 2019, Afonso left the Estádio D. Afonso Henriques and joined C.D. Santa Clara on a three-year contract.

== Honours ==
Tondela

- Liga Portugal 2: 2024–25
