= 2023–24 Moreirense F.C. season =

Moreirense F.C.
2023–24 season
- Manager: Rui Borges
- Stadium: Parque Joaquim de Almeida Freitas
- Primeira Liga: 6th
- Taça de Portugal: Third round
- Taça da Liga: First round
- Top goalscorer: League: André Luis (5); All: André Luis (5)
- Biggest win: Rio Ave 0–4 Moreirense
- Biggest defeat: Sporting CP 3–0 Moreirense

The 2023–24 season is Moreirense F.C.'s 86th season in existence and first one back in the Primeira Liga after winning the 2022–23 Liga Portugal 2. They also competed in the Taça de Portugal and Taça da Liga.

== Players ==
=== First-team squad ===
As of 26 September 2023

Note: Flags indicate national team as defined under FIFA eligibility rules; some limited exceptions apply. Players may hold more than one non-FIFA nationality.

No.	Pos.	Nation	Player
2	DF	BRA	Fabiano
4	DF	BRA	Rafael Santos
6	MF	POR	Ismael
7	FW	BRA	Matheus Aiás
8	MF	BRA	Wallisson
9	FW	BRA	André Luis
10	MF	POR	Pedro Aparício
11	MF	BRA	Alan
13	DF	SEN	Alhassane Sylla
14	DF	CPV	Carlos Ponck
17	FW	CUW	Jeremy Antonisse (captain)
18	DF	POR	Pedro Amador
19	FW	POR	João Camacho

No.	Pos.	Nation	Player
21	FW	RSA	Kobamelo Kodisang
22	GK	BRA	Caio Secco
23	DF	NED	Godfried Frimpong
26	DF	BRA	Maracás
28	FW	GBS	Hernâni
31	FW	BRA	Madson
40	GK	BRA	Kewin
44	DF	BRA	Marcelo
66	DF	POR	Gilberto Batista
76	DF	POR	Dinis Pinto
80	MF	GHA	Lawrence Ofori
88	MF	POR	Gonçalo Franco
90	FW	POR	Rodrigo Macedo (on loan from Braga)

=== Out on loan ===
Note: Flags indicate national team as defined under FIFA eligibility rules; some limited exceptions apply. Players may hold more than one non-FIFA nationality.

No.	Pos.	Nation	Player
77	MF	GAM	Matar Manga (at Real S.C. until 1 July 2024)
97	MF	BRA	Luiz Henrique (at Brusque until 31 December 2023)
99	FW	GAM	Ebrima Ndow (at Mirandela until 1 July 2024)

== Transfers ==
=== In ===
Pos.	Player	Transferred from	Fee	Date	Source
MF	(South Africa) Kobamelo Kodisang	(Portugal) Braga	€500,000	1 July 2023	
DF	(Brazil) Fabiano	(Portugal) Braga	€1,000,000	9 August 2023	
MF	(Brazil) Wallisson	(Brazil) Cruzeiro	€350,000	30 August 2023	
DF	(Cape Verde) Carlos Ponck	(Portugal) Chaves	Free	4 September 2023	

=== Out ===
Pos.	Player	Transferred to	Fee	Date	Source

== Pre-season and friendlies ==
Win Draw Loss Fixtures

29 July 2023 Friendly	Moreirense (Portugal)	4–3	(Portugal) Vilaverdense
10:30

3 August 2023 Friendly	Arouca (Portugal)	0–0	(Portugal) Moreirense
10:30

17 November 2023 Friendly	Moreirense (Portugal)	2–0	(Portugal) Rio Ave
10:30

== Competitions ==
=== Overall record ===
Competition	First match	Last match	Starting round	Final position	Record							
Competition	First match	Last match	Starting round	Final position	Pld	W	D	L	GF	GA	GD	Win %
Primeira Liga	16 August 2023	19 May 2024	Matchday 1		13	6	4	3	15	11	+4	46.15
Taça de Portugal	21 October 2023		Third round	Third round	1	0	0	1	1	2	−1	0.00
Taça da Liga	23 July 2023		First round	First round	1	0	1	0	1	1	+0	0.00
Total					15	6	5	4	17	14	+3	40.00

Last updated: 11 December 2023
Source: Soccerway

=== Primeira Liga ===
==== League table ====
Pos	Team	Pld	W	D	L	GF	GA	GD	Pts	Qualification or relegation
4	Braga	34	21	5	8	71	50	+21	68	Qualification for the Europa League second qualifying round (Note: Since the 2023–24 Taça de Portugal winners, Porto, finished in top three, the spot given to the third-placed team (Europa League second qualifying round) was passed to the fourth-placed team, and the spot given to the fourth-placed team (Conference League second qualifying round) was passed to the fifth-placed team.)
5	Vitória de Guimarães	34	19	6	9	52	38	+14	63	Qualification for the Conference League second qualifying round
6	Moreirense	34	16	7	11	36	35	+1	55	
7	Arouca	34	13	7	14	54	50	+4	46	
8	Famalicão	34	10	12	12	37	41	−4	42	

Source: Liga Portugal
Rules for classification: 1) Points; 2) Head-to-head points; 3) Head-to-head goal difference; 4) Head-to-head away goals scored; 5) Goal difference; 6) Matches won; 7) Goals scored; 8) Play-off.

==== Results summary ====
Overall								Home						Away					
Pld	W	D	L	GF	GA	GD	Pts	W	D	L	GF	GA	GD	W	D	L	GF	GA	GD
26	12	6	8	28	27	+1	42	6	3	4	15	14	+1	6	3	4	13	13	0

Last updated: 17 March 2024.
Source: Superliga

==== Results by round ====
Round	1	2	3	4	5	6	7	8	9	10	11	12	13	14	15	16	17	18	19	20	21	22	23	24	25	26	27
Ground	H	A	H	A	A	H	A	H	A	H	A	H	A	H	A	H	A	A	H	A	H	H	A	H	A	H	A
Result	L	D	L	W	L	W	W	D	W	W	W	D	D	W	D	L	W	L	W	L	W	L	W	D	L	W	
Position	13	14	15	10	16	9	8	8	7	6	5	6	6	6	6	6	6	6	6	6	6	6	6	6	6	6	

Updated to match(es) played on 17 March 2024. Source: Superliga
A = Away; H = Home; W = Win; D = Draw; L = Loss

==== Matches ====
The league fixtures were unveiled on 5 July 2023.

14 August 2023 1	Moreirense	1–2	Porto	Moreira de Cónegos
18:45 WET	Frimpong 51'; Ofori (yellow card) 62'; Dinis Pinto (yellow card) 76'; Fabiano (yellow card) 90+5'; Gonçalo Franco (yellow card) 90+8'	Report	João Mário (yellow card) 22'; Toni Martínez 67' (yellow card) 72'; Galeno (yellow card) 68'; Wendell 74' (yellow card) 78' (yellow-red card) 90+2'; Nico González (yellow card) 90+5'	Stadium: Parque de Jogos Comendador Joaquim de Almeida Freitas; Attendance: 5,674; Referee: (Portugal) Hélder Malheiro

21 August 2023 2	Famalicão	0–0	Moreirense	Vila Nova de Famalicão
20:15 WET	Pablo (yellow card) 21' (yellow-red card) 45+5'; Henrique Araújo (yellow card) 30'; Topić (yellow card) 87'	Report	Gonçalo Franco (yellow card) 23'; Pedro Aparício (yellow card) 76'; Ofori (yellow card) 83'	Stadium: Estádio Municipal 22 de Junho; Attendance: 4,640; Referee: (Portugal) António Nobre

3 September 2023 4	Chaves	1–2	Moreirense	Chaves
15:30 WET	Bruno Rodrigues (yellow card) 10'; Nwakali (yellow card) 56'; Bruno Langa 72'; Paulo Victor (yellow card) 90'	Report	Alan 3'; Frimpong (yellow card) 21'; André Luis (yellow card) 45+4'; João Camacho 84'; Fabiano (yellow card) 86'; Ofori (yellow card) 89'	Stadium: Estádio Municipal Eng. Manuel Branco Teixeira; Attendance: 2,406; Referee: (Portugal) Hélder Carvalho

9 September 2023 3	Moreirense	2–3	Braga	Moreira de Cónegos
18:00 WET	Maracás (yellow card) 16'; André Luis 40'; Madson 45+1'; Ofori (yellow card) 65'	Report	Rony Lopes 27'; José Fonte (yellow card) 32'; João Moutinho (yellow card) 55'; Banza 82'; Al-Musrati 90+6'	Stadium: Parque de Jogos Comendador Joaquim de Almeida Freitas; Attendance: 2,875; Referee: (Portugal) Claúdio Pereira

17 September 2023 5	Sporting CP	3–0	Moreirense	Lisbon
20:30 WET	Gonçalo Inácio (yellow card) 4'; Nuno Santos (yellow card) 35'; Hjulmand 55' (yellow card) 69'; Gyökeres 61'; Diomande 90+6'	Report	Maracás (yellow card) 20' (yellow-red card) 88'; Marcelo (yellow card) 49'	Stadium: Estádio José Alvalade; Attendance: 36,815; Referee: (Portugal) Manuel Oliveira

23 September 2023 6	Moreirense	1–0	Farense	Moreira de Cónegos
15:30 WET	Alan 17'; Carlos Ponck (yellow card) 51'	Report	Pastor (yellow card) 22'; Mattheus Oliveira (yellow card) 86'	Stadium: Parque de Jogos Comendador Joaquim de Almeida Freitas; Attendance: 1,695; Referee: (Portugal) João Gonçalves

1 October 2023 7	Rio Ave	0–4	Moreirense	Vila do Conde
20:30 WET	Guga (yellow card) 21'; Pantalon (yellow card) 26'; Costinha (yellow card) 33'	Report	Fabiano 8'; João Camacho 18' 50'; André Luis (yellow card) 43'; Alan (yellow card) 53'; Gonçalo Franco (yellow card) 77'; Madson 82' (yellow card) 83'; Wallisson (yellow card) 85'	Stadium: Estádio dos Arcos; Attendance: 2,695; Referee: (Portugal) Carlos Macedo

6 October 2023 8	Moreirense	1–1	Boavista	Moreira de Cónegos
20:15 WET	André Luis 35'	Report	Marcelo 21' (o.g.); Bruno Lourenço (yellow card) 47'; Awaziem (yellow card) 65'; Miguel Reisinho (yellow card) 80'	Stadium: Parque de Jogos Comendador Joaquim de Almeida Freitas; Attendance: 2,388; Referee: (Portugal) David Silva

27 October 2023 9	Arouca	0–1	Moreirense	Arouca
20:15 WET	Trezza (yellow card) 37'; Kouassi (yellow card) 46'	Report	Marcelo 39'; Antonisse (yellow card) 76' (yellow-red card) 89'	Stadium: Estádio Municipal de Arouca; Attendance: 1,037; Referee: (Portugal) Bruno Pires Costa

5 November 2023 10	Moreirense	1–0	Vitória de Guimarães	Moreira de Cónegos
15:30 WET	Alan (yellow card) 41'; André Luis 76'	Report	Tomás Händel (yellow card) 55'; Tomás Ribeiro (yellow card) 75'	Stadium: Parque de Jogos Comendador Joaquim de Almeida Freitas; Attendance: 4,351; Referee: (Portugal) Gustavo Correia

11 November 2023 11	Estrela da Amadora	0–1	Moreirense	Amadora
18:00 WET	Léo Cordeiro (yellow card) 40'; João Reis (yellow card) 56'; Kialonda Gaspar (yellow card) 90+6'	Report	Madson (yellow card) 11'; André Luis (yellow card) 51' (goal) 90'; Alan (yellow card) 54'; Maracás (yellow card) 62'; Marcelo (yellow card) 76'; Ofori (yellow card) 81'; Wallisson (red card) 90+2'	Stadium: Estádio José Gomes; Attendance: 3,458; Referee: (Portugal) Hélder Carvalho

3 December 2023 12	Moreirense	0–0	Benfica	Moreira de Cónegos
18:00 WET	Ismael (yellow card) 23'; Maracás (yellow card) 45+4'; Gonçalo Franco (yellow card) 46'; Marcelo (yellow card) 50'	Report	Kökçü (yellow card) 79'	Stadium: Parque de Jogos Comendador Joaquim de Almeida Freitas; Attendance: 5,664; Referee: (Portugal) Fábio Veríssimo

11 December 2023 13	Gil Vicente	1–1	Moreirense	Barcelos
20:15 WET	Pedro Tiba 6' (pen.); Leonardo Buta (yellow card) 21'; Zé Carlos (yellow card) 24'; Martim Neto (yellow card) 52'; Murilo Costa (yellow card) 67'; Gbane (yellow card) 80'	Report	Fabiano (yellow card) 31'; Gonçalo Franco (yellow card) 66'; André Luis 83' (pen.); Wallisson (yellow card) 88'	Stadium: Estádio Cidade de Barcelos; Attendance: 2,382; Referee: (Portugal) Hélder Malheiro

17 December 2023 14	Moreirense	5–2	Portimonense	Moreira de Cónegos
15:30 WET	Maracás 23'; Madson 25'; João Camacho (yellow card) 38'; Wallisson (yellow card) 76'; André Luis 84'; Kodisang 89'; Matheus Aiás 90+2'	Report	Jasper 40'; Gonçalo Costa (yellow card) 47'; Filipe Relvas (yellow card) 56' (goal) 74'	Stadium: Parque de Jogos Comendador Joaquim de Almeida Freitas; Attendance: 1,453; Referee: (Portugal) André Narciso

23 December 2023 15	Vizela	0–0	Moreirense	Vizela
15:30 WET	Pedro Ortiz (yellow card) 41'; Rodrigo Escoval (yellow card) 78'; Matheus Pereira (yellow card) 85'	Report	André Luis (yellow card) 17'	Stadium: Estádio do Futebol Clube de Vizela; Attendance: 4,334; Referee: (Portugal) Fábio Melo

8 January 2024 16	Moreirense	1–4	Casa Pia	Moreira de Cónegos
20:15 WET	Matheus Aiás 14'; João Camacho (yellow card) 40'; Antonisse (yellow card) 90+5'	Report	Soma 18'; Felippe Cardoso 26' 56' (yellow card) 35'; João Nunes 39'; Segovia (yellow card) 90+5'	Stadium: Parque de Jogos Comendador Joaquim de Almeida Freitas; Attendance: 944; Referee: (Portugal) Ricardo Baixinho

13 January 2024 17	Estoril	1–3	Moreirense	Estoril
20:30 WET	Rodrigo Gomes (yellow card) 25'; Mateus Fernandes (yellow card) 83'; João Carlos 90'	Report	Pedro Aparício 30'; Marcelo 33'; Ismael (yellow card) 39'; Alan (yellow card) 45+2' (goal) 74'; Antonisse (yellow card) 73'	Stadium: Estádio António Coimbra da Mota; Attendance: 1,762; Referee: (Portugal) Miguel Nogueira

20 January 2024 18	Porto	5–0	Moreirense	Porto
20:30 WET	Wendell 8' 72'; Evanilson 60'; Galeno 69'; Varela 83'	Report	Ismael (yellow card) 34'; Dinis Pinto (yellow card) 45'; Pedro Aparício (yellow card) 90+1'	Stadium: Estádio do Dragão; Attendance: 34,200; Referee: (Portugal) Luís Godinho

28 January 2024 19	Moreirense	1–0	Famalicão	Moreira de Cónegos
15:30 WET	Marcelo (yellow card) 20'; Ofori (yellow card) 43'; Maracás 82'; Kewin (yellow card) 90+5'	Report	Francisco Moura (yellow card) 17'; Gustavo Sá (yellow card) 68'	Stadium: Parque de Jogos Comendador Joaquim de Almeida Freitas; Attendance: 2,327; Referee: (Portugal) Nuno Almeida

4 February 2024 20	Braga	1–0	Moreirense	Braga
20:30 WET	Abel Ruiz 8'; Paulo Oliveira (yellow card) 82'	Report	Gonçalo Franco (yellow card) 34'; Ofori (yellow card) 36'	Stadium: Estádio Municipal de Braga; Attendance: 12,275; Referee: (Portugal) João Pinheiro (referee)

10 February 2024 21	Moreirense	1–0	Chaves	Moreira de Cónegos
18:00 WET	Dinis Pinto (yellow card) 38'; Antonisse (yellow card) 43'; Madson 73'; André Castro (yellow card) 90+1'	Report	Pius (yellow card) 11'; Vasco Fernandes (yellow card) 17'	Stadium: Parque de Jogos Comendador Joaquim de Almeida Freitas; Attendance: 1,340; Referee: (Portugal) José Bessa

19 February 2024 22	Moreirense	0–2	Sporting CP	Moreira de Cónegos
20:15 WET		Report	Morita 3'; Pote 23'; Nuno Santos (yellow card) 56'	Stadium: Parque de Jogos Comendador Joaquim de Almeida Freitas; Attendance: 5,163; Referee: (Portugal) Fábio Veríssimo

=== Taça de Portugal ===
21 October 2023 Third Round	Paredes	2–1	Moreirense	Paredes
14:00 WET	Murilo Rosa (yellow card) 10'; Nuno Moreira 44'; Onyeka Osemene 81'	Report	Carlos Ponck (red card) 1'; Alan 58'	Stadium: Cidade Desportiva De Paredes; Referee: (Portugal) João Ferreira

=== Taça da Liga ===
23 July 2023 First Round	Moreirense	1–1 (3–4 p)	Farense	Moreira de Cónegos
15:30 WET	Dinis Pinto (yellow card) 15'; João Camacho (yellow card) 45'; Kodisang (yellow card) 62'; André Luis 89'	Report	Rui Costa 21'; Mattheus Oliveira (yellow card) 56'; Muscat (yellow card) 63'; Talys (yellow card) 66'; Ricardo Velho (yellow card) 75'; Maxwel Cássio (yellow card) 79'	Stadium: Parque Moreira de Cónegos; Attendance: 1,208; Referee: (Portugal) Claúdio Pereira
