= List of Portuguese football transfers summer 2023 =

This is a list of Portuguese football transfers for the summer of 2023. The summer transfer window will open 1 July and close at midnight on 31 August. Players may be bought before the transfer windows opens, but may only join their new club on 1 July. Only moves involving Primeira Liga clubs are listed. Additionally, players without a club may join a club at any time.

== Transfers ==
Date	Name	Moving from	Moving to	Fee
1 June 2023	(Portugal) Diogo Leite	Porto	(Germany) Union Berlin	€7.5m
3 June 2023	(Spain) Iker Unzueta	(Spain) Logroñés	Vizela	Undisclosed
6 June 2023	(Brazil) Vitor Carvalho	Gil Vicente	Braga	Undisclosed
6 June 2023	(Brazil) Caio Secco	Penafiel	Moreirense	Free
7 June 2023	(Spain) Víctor Gómez	(Spain) Espanyol	Braga	€2m
7 June 2023	(France) Sikou Niakaté	(France) EA Guingamp	Braga	€1.8m
8 June 2023	(Portugal) André Geraldes	(Israel) Maccabi Tel Aviv	Casa Pia	Free
14 June 2023	(Portugal) Bruma	(Turkey) Fenerbahçe	Braga	Undisclosed
14 June 2023	(Portugal) João Mendes	Chvaes	Vitória de Guimarães	Free
14 June 2023	(Brazil) Paulo Vítor	Chaves	(Saudi Arabia) Al-Okhdood	Free
16 June 2023	(Cape Verde) Telmo Arcanjo	Tondela	Vitória de Guimarães	Free
16 June 2023	(Brazil) Otávio	(Brazil) Flamengo	Famalicão	Undisclosed
19 June 2023	(Portugal) Tiago Dias	Feirense	Casa Pia	Undisclosed
19 June 2023	(Portugal) Luís Semedo	Benfica	(England) Sunderland	Undisclosed
20 June 2023	(Spain) Adrián Marín	Gil Vicente	Braga	Undisclosed
21 June 2023	(Portugal) Zé Carlos	Braga	Gil Vicente	Undisclosed
22 June 2023	(Portugal) Gilberto	Sporting CP	Moreirense	Free
23 June 2023	(Portugal) Iuri Medeiros	Braga	(United Arab Emirates) Al-Nasr	€3m
23 June 2023	(Portugal) Francisco Moura	Braga	Famalicão	Undisclosed
23 June 2023	(Portugal) Afonso Taira	Casa Pia	(Saudi Arabia) Al-Kholood	Undisclosed
24 June 2023	(Guinea-Bissau) Jardel	Feirense	Vizela	Undisclosed
25 June 2023	(Brazil) Juninho	Chaves	(Azerbaijan) Qarabağ	Undisclosed
26 June 2023	(Portugal) Rafael Barbosa	Tondela	Farense	Free
26 June 2023	(Portugal) Tiago Esgaio	Braga	Arouca	Loan
26 June 2023	(Portugal) Pedro Santos	Braga	Arouca	Undisclosed
27 June 2023	(Brazil) Charles	(Cyprus) Olympiakos Nicosia	Vitória de Guimarães	Free
27 June 2023	(Venezuela) Matías Lacava	(Venezuela) Puerto Cabello	Vizela	Loan
27 June 2023	(Ghana) Lawrence Ofori	Famalicão	Moreirense	Free
28 June 2023	(South Africa) Kobamelo Kodisang	Braga	Moreirense	€500k
28 June 2023	(Switzerland) Francesco Ruberto	(Switzerland) Schaffhausen	Vizela	Undisclosed
29 June 2023	(Brazil) Luiz Felipe	Vizela	Farense	Undisclosed
29 June 2023	(Portugal) Dinis Pinto	Braga	Moreirense	Free
29 June 2023	(Serbia) Mirko Topić	(Serbia) Vojvodina	Famalicão	Undisclosed
30 June 2023	(Portugal) Sandro Cruz	Benfica	Chaves	Undisclosed
30 June 2023	(Nigeria) Friday Etim	Vizela	Mafra	Undisclosed
30 June 2023	(Portugal) Pedro Pinho	Sanjoanense	Chaves	Free
30 June 2023	(Portugal) Bruno Rodrigues	Braga	Chaves	Undisclosed
30 June 2023	(Portugal) Pedro Sá	Portimonense	Estrela	Free
1 July 2023	(Portugal) Kiki Afonso	Vizela	(Russia) Ural Yekaterinburg	Free
1 July 2023	(Brazil) Fernando Andrade	Porto	Casa Pia	Free
1 July 2023	(Portugal) Rafael Brito	Benfica	Casa Pia	Undisclosed
1 July 2023	(Palestine) Oday Dabbagh	Arouca	(Belgium) Charleroi	Free
1 July 2023	(Spain) Cristo González	(Italy) Udinese	Arouca	Undisclosed
1 July 2023	(Spain) Álex Grimaldo	Benfica	(Germany) Bayer Leverkusen	Free
1 July 2023	(Bulgaria) Sylvester Jasper	(England) Fulham	Portimonense	Free
1 July 2023	(Turkey) Orkun Kökçü	(Netherlands) Feyenoord	Benfica	Undisclosed
1 July 2023	(Portugal) Diego Moreira	Benfica	(England) Chelsea	Free
1 July 2023	(Portugal) Hélder Sá	Vitória de Guimarães	(Poland) Radomiak Radom	Loan
1 July 2023	(Germany) Julian Weigl	Benfica	(Germany) Borussia Mönchengladbach	€8m
2 July 2023	(Portugal) Nuno Sequeira	Braga	(Turkey) Pendikspor	Undisclosed
3 July 2023	(Brazil) Alanzinho	(Brazil) Palmeiras	Moreirense	Free
3 July 2023	(Guinea-Bissau) Manuel Baldé	Vizela	Penafiel	Undisclosed
3 July 2023	(Netherlands) Justin de Haas	(Croatia) Lokomotiva Zagreb	Famalicão	Undisclosed
3 July 2023	(Brazil) Vinícius Dias	(Brazil) Volta Redonda	Gil Vicente	Undisclosed
3 July 2023	(Brazil) Abner Felipe	Farense	(Belgium) RWD Molenbeek	Free
3 July 2023	(Portugal) Artur Jorge	(United Arab Emirates) Al Bataeh	Farense	Free
3 July 2023	(Spain) Gaizka Larrazabal	(Spain) Zaragoza	Casa Pia	Free
4 July 2023	(Brazil) Yago Cariello	Portimonense	(South Korea) Gangwon	Loan
4 July 2023	(Brazil) Léo Jabá	(Brazil) São Bernardo	Estrela	Loan
4 July 2023	(France) Nicolas Janvier	Vitória de Guimarães	(Turkey) Alanyaspor	Undisclosed
4 July 2023	(Portugal) Ricardo Mangas	Boavista	Vitória de Guimarães	€1m
4 July 2023	(Brazil) Lucas Mineiro	Braga	(Brazil) Cuaibá	Loan
4 July 2023	(Brazil) Anderson Silva	Vitória de Guimarães	(Turkey) Alanyaspor	Undisclosed
4 July 2023	(Portugal) Samú Silva	Chaves	Marítimo	Undisclosed
4 July 2023	(Portugal) Heriberto Tavares	Famalicão	Estoril	Undisclosed
4 July 2023	(Portugal) Kiko Vilas Boas	Sanjoanense	Gil Vicente	Free
5 July 2023	(Brazil) Lucas Barros	Gil Vicente	Tondela	Loan
5 July 2023	(Argentina) Ángel Di María	(Italy) Juventus	Benfica	Free
5 July 2023	(Portugal) Kikas	B-SAD	Estrela	Free
5 July 2023	(Spain) Fran Navarro	Gil Vicente	Porto	€7m
5 July 2023	(Portugal) Tiago Santos	Estoril	(France) Lille	€6.5m
5 July 2023	(Switzerland) Haris Seferovic	Benfica	(United Arab Emirates) Al Wasl	Undisclosed
5 July 2023	(Portugal) Ricardo Teixeira	Benfica	Leixões	Loan
5 July 2023	(Portugal) Tiago Tomás	Sporting CP	(Germany) VfL Wolfsburg	Undisclosed
5 July 2023	(Czech Republic) Matouš Trmal	Vitória de Guimarães	(Czech Republic) Mladá Boleslav	Undisclosed
6 July 2023	(Spain) Adrián Butzke	(Spain) Granada	Vitória de Guimarães	Undisclosed
6 July 2023	(Brazil) Thomas Luciano	(Brazil) Grêmio	Gil Vicente	Undisclosed
6 July 2023	(Brazil) Matheus Nogueria	Portimonense	(Brazil) Paysandu	Loan
6 July 2023	(Brazil) Guilherme Schettine	Braga	(Russia) Ural Yekaterinburg	Undisclosed
6 July 2023	(Brazil) Hugo Souza	(Brazil) Flamengo	Chaves	Loan
6 July 2023	(Brazil) Talys	(Croatia) Slaven Belupo	Farense	Undisclosed
7 July 2023	(Colombia) Wilinton Aponzá	Portimonense	(South Korea) Chungnam Asan	Loan
7 July 2023	(Serbia) Nikola Bursać	(Serbia) TSC	Vizela	Undisclosed
7 July 2023	(Brazil) Léo Cordeiro	Mafra	Estrela	Free
7 July 2023	(France) Jean-Baptiste Gorby	Braga	Paços de Ferreira	Loan
7 July 2023	(Ukraine) Orest Lebedenko	(Spain) Deportivo La Coruña	Vizela	Undisclosed
7 July 2023	(Uruguay) Manuel Ugarte	Sporting CP	(France) Paris Saint-Germain	€60m
8 July 2023	(Colombia) Rafael Bustamante	(Colombia) Deportivo Cali	Vizela	Loan
8 July 2023	(Brazil) Maracás	(United Arab Emirates) Al Wahda	Moreirense	Free
8 July 2023	(Portugal) Schürrle	Braga	Oliveirense	Undisclosed
9 July 2023	(Brazil) Gilberto	Benfica	(Brazil) Bahia	€2.5m
9 July 2023	(Brazil) Eduardo Teixeira	Braga	(Armenia) Urartu	Undisclosed
10 July 2023	(Spain) Fran Delgado	(Spain) Real Betis	Farense	Undisclosed
10 July 2023	(Czech Republic) David Jurásek	(Czech Republic) Slavia Prague	Benfica	€14m
10 July 2023	(Cameroon) Duplexe Tchamba	(Denmark) SønderjyskE	Casa Pia	Undisclosed
11 July 2023	(Slovakia) Róbert Boženík	(Netherlands) Feyenoord	Boavista	Undisclosed
12 July 2023	(Italy) Cher Ndour	Benfica	(France) Paris Saint-Germain	Free
13 July 2023	(Italy) Ibrahima Bamba	Vitória de Guimarães	(Qatar) Al-Duhail	€9m
13 July 2023	(Sweden) Viktor Gyökeres	(England) Coventry City	Sporting CP	€20m
13 July 2023	(Portugal) João Resende	Benfica	União de Leiria	Undisclosed
13 July 2023	(Ghana) Maxwell Woledzi	Vitória de Guimarães	(Norway) Fredrikstad	Undisclosed
14 July 2023	(Ecuador) Ronie Carrillo	(Ecuador) El Nacional	Portimonense	Undisclosed
14 July 2023	(Portugal) Ricardo Matos	Portimonense	Belenenses	Loan
14 July 2023	(Ivory Coast) Zié Ouattara	Portimonense	União de Leiria	Undisclosed
14 July 2023	(Uruguay) Rodrigo Zalazar	(Germany) Schalke 04	Braga	Undisclosed
15 July 2023	(Brazil) Marcelo	(United Arab Emirates) Dibba Al Fujairah	Moreirense	Free
17 July 2023	(Nigeria) Monsuru Opeyemi	Vizela	Sporting da Covilhã	Undisclosed
18 July 2023	(Portugal) Henrique Araújo	Benfica	Famalicão	Loan
18 July 2023	(Spain) Héctor Bellerín	Sporting CP	(Spain) Real Betis	Free
18 July 2023	(Portugal) Leonardo Buta	(Italy) Udinese	Gil Vicente	Loan
18 July 2023	(Brazil) Richard dos Santos	Rio Ave	AD Fafe	Loan
18 July 2023	(Brazil) Guilherme Ferreira	Pedras Salgadas	Chaves	Free
18 July 2023	(Portugal) José Fonte	(France) Lille	Braga	Free
18 July 2023	(Spain) Diego Llorente	Boavista	(Spain) Poli El Ejido	Loan
18 July 2023	(Brazil) Ygor Nogueira	Santa Clara	Chaves	Free
18 July 2023	(Brazil) Paulinho	(Denmark) Viborg	Portimonense	Loan
18 July 2023	(France) Loreintz Rosier	Estoril	(Netherlands) Fortuna Sittard	Undisclosed
18 July 2023	(Portugal) Ângelo Taveira	Farense	Portimonense	Undisclosed
18 July 2023	(Brazil) Vinícius	(Brazil) Palmeiras	Portimonense	Undisclosed
19 July 2023	(Peru) Jesús Castillo	(Peru) Sporting Cristal	Gil Vicente	Undisclosed
19 July 2023	(Japan) Toki Hirosawa	Portimonense	Académica de Coimbra	Loan
19 July 2023	(Angola) Manuel Keliano	(Angola) 1º de Agosto	Estrela	Free
20 July 2023	(Croatia) Roko Baturina	(Hungary) Ferencváros	Gil Vicente	Undisclosed
20 July 2023	(Brazil) Bruno Duarte	(Saudi Arabia) Damac	Farense	Free
20 July 2023	(Portugal) João Escoval	(Greece) Volos	Vizela	Free
20 July 2023	(France) Samuel Essende	(France) SM Caen	Vizela	Loan
20 July 2023	(Nigeria) Kelechi Nwakali	(Spain) Ponferradina	Chaves	Undisclosed
20 July 2023	(Portugal) Rúben Vinagre	Sporting CP	(England) Hull City	Loan
21 July 2023	(Portugal) Rafael Alcobia	Tondela	Portimonense	Undisclosed
21 July 2023	(Brazil) Igor Formiga	(Brazil) Cruzeiro	Portimonense	Free
21 July 2023	(Brazil) Rildo	Santa Clara	Portimonense	Loan
21 July 2023	(Brazil) Pablo Roberto	(Brazil) Vila Nova	Casa Pia	Undisclosed
22 July 2023	(Portugal) Tiago Dantas	Benfica	(Netherlands) AZ	Loan
22 July 2023	(Spain) Mario González	Braga	(United States) LAFC	€2.3m
22 July 2023	(Pakistan) Easah Suliman	Vitória de Guimarães	(Azerbaijan) Sumgayit	Undisclosed
24 July 2023	(Portugal) Vasco Oliveira	Farense	União de Leiria	Undisclosed
24 July 2023	(Portugal) Alexandre Penetra	Famalicão	(Netherlands) AZ	Undisclosed
24 July 2023	(Honduras) Bryan Róchez	Portimonense	União de Leiria	Loan
25 July 2023	(France) Tidjany Touré	(Netherlands) Feyenoord	Gil Vicente	Loan
26 July 2023	(Republic of the Congo) Dylan Saint-Louis	(Turkey) Hatayspor	Vizela	Undisclosed
26 July 2023	(Brazil) Lucas Veríssimo	Benfica	(Brazil) Corinthians	Loan
27 July 2023	(France) Rafik Guitane	(France) Reims	Estoril	Undisclosed
27 July 2023	(Venezuela) Alejandro Marqués	(Italy) Juventus	Estoril	Undisclosed
28 July 2023	(Brazil) Erivaldo Almeida	(Brazil) Novorizontino	Estrela	Undisclosed
28 July 2023	(Switzerland) Maxime Dominguez	(Poland) Raków Częstochowa	Gil Vicente	€200k
28 July 2023	(Scotland) Jordan Holsgrove	(Greece) Olympiacos	Estoril	Loan
29 July 2023	(Spain) Nico González	(Spain) Barcelona	Porto	€8.5m
29 July 2023	(Finland) Otso Liimatta	(Finland) AC Oulu	Famalicão	Undisclosed
30 July 2023	(Portugal) Alex Soares	(Angola) Petro Atlético	Estoril	Undisclosed
31 July 2023	(Portugal) Gonçalo Cunha	Vizela	Anadia	Undisclosed
31 July 2023	(Romania) Alex Dobre	(France) Dijon	Famalicão	€600k
31 July 2023	(Ivory Coast) Mory Gbane	(Russia) Khimki	Gil Vicente	Loan
31 July 2023	(Portugal) Serginho	Estoril	(Denmark) Viborg	€500k
1 August 2023	(Portugal) Joãozinho	Estoril	Torreense	Undisclosed
1 August 2023	(Brazil) Rodrigo Macedo	Braga	Moreirense	Loan
1 August 2023	(Brazil) João Marcelo	Porto	(Brazil) Cruzeiro	Loan
1 August 2023	(Portugal) Martim Neto	Benfica	Gil Vicente	Loan
1 August 2023	(Brazil) Paulo Victor	(Brazil) Ituano	Chaves	Undisclosed
2 August 2023	(Japan) Takahiro Kunimoto	Casa Pia	(Malaysia) Johor Darul Ta'zim	Free
2 August 2023	(Portugal) Rony Lopes	(Spain) Sevilla	Braga	Free
3 August 2023	(Portugal) Tomás Esteves	Porto	(Italy) Pisa	Undisclosed
4 August 2023	(Portugal) Rodrigo Gomes	Braga	Estoril	Loan
5 August 2023	(Cape Verde) Ivanildo Fernandes	Vizela	(United Arab Emirates) Ittihad Kalba	Undisclosed
5 August 2023	(Brazil) Jajá	(Brazil) Athletico Paranaense	Casa Pia	Loan
5 August 2023	(Senegal) Alioune Ndour	B-SAD	Estrela	Undisclosed
7 August 2023	(Portugal) Wilson Manafá	Porto	(Spain) Granada	Free
7 August 2023	(Portugal) Gonçalo Ramos	Benfica	(France) Paris Saint-Germain	Loan
8 August 2023	(Spain) Óscar Aranda	(Spain) Real Madrid Castilla	Famalicão	Undisclosed
8 August 2023	(France) Tom Lacoux	(France) Bordeaux	Famalicão	Loan
8 August 2023	(Portugal) Manuel Namora	Boavista	Leixões	Loan
8 August 2023	(Brazil) Nathan	(Brazil) Santos	Famalicão	Loan
9 August 2023	(Portugal) André Amaro	Vitória de Guimarães	(Qatar) Al-Rayyan	€8.5m
9 August 2023	(Brazil) Fabiano	Braga	Moreirense	€700k
9 August 2023	(Austria) Alexander Schmidt	Vizela	Austria Wien	Free
10 August 2023	(Brazil) Arthur Cabral	(Italy) Fiorentina	Benfica	Undisclosed
10 August 2023	(Senegal) Mamadou Loum	Porto	(Saudi Arabia) Al Raed	Loan
10 August 2023	(Ukraine) Anatoliy Trubin	(Ukraine) Shakhtar Donetsk	Benfica	€10m
11 August 2023	(Portugal) Youssef Chermiti	Sporting CP	(England) Everton	Undisclosed
11 August 2023	(France) Mohamed Diaby	Portimonense	(England) Sheffield Wednesday	Loan
13 August 2023	(Denmark) Morten Hjulmand	(Italy) Lecce	Sporting CP	€18m
14 August 2023	(Argentina) Joaquín Novillo	(Argentina) Belgrano	Vizela	Loan
14 August 2023	(South Africa) Thibang Phete	(United Arab Emirates) Al Bataeh	Chaves	Free
14 August 2023	(Portugal) Leandro Sanca	(Italy) Spezia	Chaves	Undisclosed
16 August 2023	(Spain) Pedro Ortiz	(Spain) Sevilla	Vizela	Loan
16 August 2023	(France) Titouan Thomas	Estoril	(France) Laval	Undisclosed
16 August 2023	(Argentina) Alan Varela	(Argentina) Boca Juniors	Porto	€8m
18 August 2023	(Brazil) Luan Campos	(Brazil) América Mineiro	Portimonense	Loan
18 August 2023	(Angola) Picas	Chaves	Feirense	Loan
18 August 2023	(Portugal) Diogo Pinto	Casa Pia	(Slovenia) Olimpija Ljubljana	Undisclosed
18 August 2023	(Brazil) Vítor Tormena	Braga	(Russia) Krasnodar	Undisclosed
19 August 2023	(Brazil) Derick Poloni	Casa Pia	(Spain) Eldense	Undisclosed
21 August 2023	(Portugal) Rúben Lameiras	Vitória de Guimarães	Chaves	Undisclosed
22 August 2023	(Portugal) Félix Correia	(Italy) Juventus	Gil Vicente	Loan
22 August 2023	(Portugal) Otávio	Porto	(Saudi Arabia) Al Nassr	€60m
22 August 2023	(Brazil) Igor Rossi	(United Arab Emirates) Ittihad Kalba	Farense	Free
23 August 2023	(England) Dennis Adeniran	(England) Sheffield Wednesday	Portimonense	Free
23 August 2023	(Brazil) Dener	(Saudi Arabia) Al-Tai	Portimonense	Free
23 August 2023	(Portugal) José Sampaio	Benfica	Vizela	Undisclosed
24 August 2023	(Portugal) Pedro Mendes	(France) Montpellier	Estrela	Free
25 August 2023	(Portugal) João Moutinho	(England) Wolverhampton Wanderers	Braga	Free
27 August 2023	(France) Soualiho Meïté	Benfica	(Greece) PAOK	Loan
29 August 2023	(Portugal) Gonçalo Guedes	(England) Wolverhampton Wanderers	Benfica	Loan
29 August 2023	(Mexico) Jorge Sánchez	(Netherlands) Ajax	Porto	Loan
30 August 2023	(Algeria) Houssem Eddine Mrezigue	(Algeria) CR Belouizdad	Vizela	Loan
31 August 2023	(Serbia) Aleksandar Busnić	(Serbia) Vojvodina	Vizela	Loan
31 August 2023	(Spain) Iván Jaime	Famalicão	Porto	Undisclosed
31 August 2023	(Spain) Alberto Soro	(Spain) Granada	Vizela	Loan
31 August 2023	(South Korea) Lee Ye-chan	(South Korea) Yeongdeungpo Technical High School	Portimonense	Undisclosed
31 August 2023	(Brazil) Zinho	(Brazil) Grêmio	Portimonense	Loan
1 September 2023	(Portugal) Berna	Braga	Trofense	Loan
1 September 2023	(Portugal) Paulo Bernardo	Benfica	(Scotland) Celtic	Loan
1 September 2023	(Spain) Juan Bernat	(France) Paris Saint-Germain	Benfica	Loan
1 September 2023	(Portugal) Francisco Conceição	(Netherlands) Ajax	Porto	Loan
1 September 2023	(Guinea-Bissau) Hernâni	Braga	Moreirense	Undisclosed
1 September 2023	(Serbia) Mihailo Ristić	Benfica	(Spain) Celta Vigo	Undisclosed
1 September 2023	(Norway) Andreas Schjelderup	Benfica	(Denmark) Nordsjælland	Loan
1 September 2023	(Argentina) Mateo Tanlongo	Sporting CP	(Denmark) Copenhagen	Loan
1 September 2023	(Greece) Odysseas Vlachodimos	Benfica	(England) Nottingham Forest	Undisclosed
