= 2021–22 Moreirense F.C. season =

Moreirense F.C.
2021–22 season
- Chairman: Vítor Magalhães
- Manager: João Henriques
- Stadium: Parque Moreira de Cónegos
- Primeira Liga: 14th
- Taça de Portugal: Fifth round
- Taça da Liga: First round
Home colours	Away colours	Third colours

The 2021–22 season is the 72nd season in the existence of Moreirense F.C. and the club's third consecutive season in the top flight of Portuguese football. In addition to the domestic league, Moreirense F.C. participated in this season's editions of the Taça de Portugal and the Taça da Liga.

== Players ==
=== First-team squad ===
As of 31 July 2021

Note: Flags indicate national team as defined under FIFA eligibility rules; some limited exceptions apply. Players may hold more than one non-FIFA nationality.

No.	Pos.	Nation	Player
1	GK	BRA	Kewin
2	DF	POR	Rodrigo Conceição (on loan from Porto)
3	DF	SRB	Lazar Rosić
4	DF	POR	Artur Jorge
5	DF	POR	Abdu Conté
6	MF	POR	Fábio Pacheco
7	FW	BRA	Walterson
8	MF	GUI	Ibrahima Camará
9	FW	BRA	André Luis
10	FW	BRA	Felipe Pires
11	FW	BRA	Yan (on loan from Palmeiras)
13	DF	BRA	Matheus Silva
14	GK	BRA	Mateus Pasinato
16	MF	GBS	Sori Mané

No.	Pos.	Nation	Player
18	MF	CRO	Nikola Jambor
19	DF	CAN	Steven Vitória
21	MF	POR	Filipe Soares
23	DF	NED	Godfried Frimpong
26	MF	POR	Alex Soares
27	FW	BRA	Derik Lacerda
30	DF	SEN	Abdoulaye Ba
36	GK	POR	Miguel Oliveira
37	FW	BRA	Jefferson Galego
66	MF	BRA	Rubén Ramos
81	DF	POR	Pedro Amador
88	MF	POR	Gonçalo Franco
99	FW	BRA	Rafael Martins

=== Other players under contract ===
Note: Flags indicate national team as defined under FIFA eligibility rules; some limited exceptions apply. Players may hold more than one non-FIFA nationality.

No.	Pos.	Nation	Player

=== Out on loan ===
Note: Flags indicate national team as defined under FIFA eligibility rules; some limited exceptions apply. Players may hold more than one non-FIFA nationality.

No.	Pos.	Nation	Player
—	FW	BRA	Lucas Silva (at Casa Pia until 30 June 2022])
—	MF	BRA	Luiz Henrique (at Náutico until 31 December 2021)

== Pre-season and friendlies ==
Win Draw Loss Fixtures

== Competitions ==
=== Overall record ===
Competition	First match	Last match	Starting round	Final position	Record							
Competition	First match	Last match	Starting round	Final position	Pld	W	D	L	GF	GA	GD	Win %
Primeira Liga	7 August 2021	May 2022	Matchday 1		14	1	6	7	14	24	−10	7.14
Taça de Portugal	16 October 2021	23 December 2021	Third round	Fifth round	3	2	0	1	7	7	+0	66.67
Taça da Liga	25 July 2021		First round	First round	1	0	1	0	1	1	+0	0.00
Total					18	3	7	8	22	32	−10	16.67

Last updated: 28 December 2021
Source: Soccerway

=== Primeira Liga ===
==== League table ====
Pos	Team	Pld	W	D	L	GF	GA	GD	Pts	Qualification or relegation
14	Vizela	34	7	12	15	37	58	−21	33	
15	Arouca	34	7	10	17	30	54	−24	31	
16	Moreirense (R)	34	7	8	19	33	51	−18	29	Qualification for the Relegation play-offs
17	Tondela (R)	34	7	7	20	41	67	−26	28	Relegation to Liga Portugal 2
18	B-SAD (R)	34	5	11	18	23	55	−32	26	Relegation to Liga Portugal 2

Source: Liga Portugal
Rules for classification: 1) Points; 2) Head-to-head points; 3) Head-to-head goal difference; 4) Head-to-head away goals scored; 5) Goal difference; 6) Matches won; 7) Goals scored; 8) Play-off.
(R) Relegated

==== Results summary ====
Overall								Home						Away					
Pld	W	D	L	GF	GA	GD	Pts	W	D	L	GF	GA	GD	W	D	L	GF	GA	GD
3	0	1	2	5	7	−2	1	0	0	1	1	2	−1	0	1	1	4	5	−1

Last updated: 20 August 2021.
Source: Liga Portugal

==== Results by round ====
Round	1	2	3
Ground	H	A	H
Result	L	D	L
Position			

Updated to match(es) played on 20 August 2021. Source: Liga Portugal
A = Away; H = Home; W = Win; D = Draw; L = Loss

==== Matches ====
7 August 2021 1	Moreirense	1–2	Benfica	Moreira de Cónegos
18:00 WEST (UTC+1)	Martins 30'; Soares (yellow card) 36'; Pires (yellow card) 69'; Jorge (yellow card) 75'; Pacheco (yellow card) 90+3'	Report	Veríssimo 8'; Waldschmidt 19'; Taarabt (yellow card) 33'; Gonçalves (red card) 56'; Weigl (yellow card) 60'; Meïté (yellow card) 81'; Silva (yellow card) 90+8'	Stadium: Parque Joaquim de Almeida Freitas; Attendance: 1,498; Referee: Vítor Ferreira

15 August 2021 2	Santa Clara	2–2	Moreirense	Ponta Delgada
20:30 WEST (UTC+1)				Stadium: Estádio de São Miguel

20 August 2021 3	Moreirense	2–3	Braga	Moreira de Cónegos
21:15 WEST (UTC+1)	Vitória 80' (pen.); Paulinho 83'	Report	Martins 39'; Medeiros 41'; Horta 90+5'	Stadium: Parque Joaquim de Almeida Freitas; Attendance: 861; Referee: Hélder Malheiro

19 September 2021 6	Porto	5–0	Moreirense	Porto
18:00 WEST (UTC+1)	Taremi 33', 71'; Díaz 51', 65'; Pepê 78'	Report		Stadium: Estádio do Dragão; Attendance: 14,009; Referee: António Nobre

25 September 2021 7	Moreirense	2–1	Arouca	Moreira de Cónegos
15:30 WEST (UTC+1)	Walterson (yellow card) 25', (goal) 29'; Vitória (yellow card) 61'; André Luis 64'; Derik Lacerda (yellow card) 74'; Felipe Pires (yellow card) 78'; Kewin (yellow card) 90+3'	Report	Ba (yellow card) 15'; André Silva 82'; Kouassi (yellow card) 90+3'	Stadium: Parque Joaquim de Almeida Freitas; Attendance: 863; Referee: Fábio Melo

23 October 2021 9	Sporting CP	1–0	Moreirense	Lisbon
20:30 WEST (UTC+1)	Coates 16'	Report		Stadium: Estádio José Alvalade; Attendance: 35,882; Referee: Vítor Ferreira

15 January 2022 18	Benfica	1–1	Moreirense	Lisbon
18:00 WET (UTC±0)	Silva (yellow card) 55'; Núñez 65'; Otamendi (yellow card) 86'; Grimaldo (yellow card) 90+6'	Report	Pacheco (yellow card) 40'; Martins (yellow card) 45+1'; Gilberto 61' (o.g.); Paulinho (yellow card) 72'; Jorge (yellow card) 89'; Kewin (yellow card) 90+6'	Stadium: Estádio da Luz; Attendance: 29,188; Referee: Rui Costa

20 February 2022 23	Moreirense	0–1	Porto	Moreira de Cónegos
20:00 WET (UTC±0)		Report	Evanilson 40'	Stadium: Parque Joaquim de Almeida Freitas; Attendance: 3,688; Referee: Luís Godinho

26 February 2022 24	Arouca	1–1	Moreirense	Arouca
20:30 WET (UTC±0)	Kouassi (yellow card) 67'; Marques 78', (yellow card) 85'; Arsénio (yellow card) 90+3'	Report	Yan 44'; Paulinho (yellow card) 45+3'; Pacheco (yellow card) 56' (yellow-red card) 65'	Stadium: Estádio Municipal de Arouca; Attendance: 1,154; Referee: João Pinheiro

=== Taça de Portugal ===
16 October 2021 Third round	Oriental Dragon	2–3 (a.e.t.)	Moreirense	Pinhal Novo
15:00 WEST (UTC+1)	Maia 30'; Gaspar 75'	Report	Franco 48'; Martins 59'; André Luis 112'	Stadium: Estádio Alfredo da Silva; Referee: João Gonçalves

21 November 2021 Fourth round	Moreirense	3–2	Vitória de Guimarães	Moreira de Cónegos
16:45 WET (UTC±0)	Yan 20', 45'; Vitória 60'	Report	Soares 89', 90+3'	Stadium: Parque Moreira de Cónegos; Referee: Rui Costa

23 December 2021 Fifth round	Mafra	3–1	Moreirense	Mafra
14:00 WET (UTC±0)	Bura 43' (pen.); Pedrinho 79'; Andrezinho 85'	Report	Yan 27'	Stadium: Estádio Municipal de Mafra; Referee: Andre Narciso

=== Taça da Liga ===
25 July 2021 First round	Penafiel	1–1 (4–3 p)	Moreirense	Penafiel
11:00 WEST (UTC+1)	Rui Pedro 66'	Report	Franco 68'	Stadium: Estádio Municipal 25 de Abril; Attendance: 0 Referee: Manuel Mota
	Penalties
	Rodrigo (penalty scored); Capela (penalty scored); Vaz (penalty scored); Amorim (penalty missed); Zé Valente (penalty scored)		(penalty scored) Yan; (penalty missed) Martins; (penalty scored) André Luis; (penalty scored) Walterson; (penalty missed) Franco
