= 2022–23 Moreirense F.C. season =

Moreirense F.C.
2022–23 season
- Chairman: Vítor Magalhães
- Manager: Paulo Alves
- Stadium: Parque Joaquim de Almeida Freitas
- Liga Portugal 2: 1st (promoted)
- Taça de Portugal: Fourth round
- Taça da Liga: Quarter-finals
- Top goalscorer: League: André Luis (14); All: André Luis (17)

The 2022–23 season was the 85th season in the history of Moreirense F.C. and their first season back in the second division of Portuguese football. The club participated in the Liga Portugal 2, the Taça de Portugal, and the Taça da Liga. The season covered the period from 1 July 2022 to 30 June 2023.

== Players ==
As of 3 February 2023

Note: Flags indicate national team as defined under FIFA eligibility rules; some limited exceptions apply. Players may hold more than one non-FIFA nationality.

No.	Pos.	Nation	Player
1	GK	POR	Sérgio Dutra
3	DF	BRA	Hugo Gomes (on loan from Rio Ave)
4	DF	BRA	Rafael Santos
6	MF	POR	Fábio Pacheco
7	FW	BRA	Walterson
9	FW	BRA	André Luis
10	MF	POR	Pedro Aparício
11	MF	BRA	Alan (on loan from Palmeiras)
13	DF	POR	Luís Rocha
16	MF	GBS	Sori Mané
18	DF	POR	Pedro Amador
19	FW	POR	João Camacho
20	DF	SEN	Alhassane Sylla

No.	Pos.	Nation	Player
21	FW	RSA	Kobamelo Kodisang (on loan from Braga)
22	DF	POR	David Bruno
23	DF	NED	Godfried Frimpong
31	FW	BRA	Madson
40	GK	BRA	Kewin
41	GK	POR	Ricardo Silva
42	DF	VEN	Víctor García
43	DF	BRA	Lucas Freitas (on loan from Palmeiras)
80	DF	GHA	Lawrence Ofori (on loan from Famalicão)
88	MF	POR	Gonçalo Franco
95	FW	BUL	Steven Petkov
99	FW	BRA	Platiny

=== Out on loan ===
Note: Flags indicate national team as defined under FIFA eligibility rules; some limited exceptions apply. Players may hold more than one non-FIFA nationality.

No. / Pos. / Nation / Player; — / MF / BRA / Luiz Henrique (at Brusque until 31 December 2023)	No. / Pos. / Nation / Player; — / MF / POR / Rúben Ramos (at Nacional until 30 June 2023)

== Pre-season and friendlies ==
Win Draw Loss Fixtures

13 July 2022 Friendly	Moreirense (Portugal)	0–0	(Portugal) Paços de Ferreira	Moreira de Cónegos
10:30 WEST (UTC+1)				Stadium: Parque de Jogos Comendador Joaquim de Almeida Freitas

== Competitions ==
=== Overall record ===
Competition	First match	Last match	Starting round	Final position	Record							
Competition	First match	Last match	Starting round	Final position	Pld	W	D	L	GF	GA	GD	Win %
Liga Portugal 2	7 August 2022	25 May 2023	Matchday 1	Winners	34	24	7	3	77	38	+39	70.59
Taça de Portugal	1 October 2022	10 November 2022	Second round	Fourth round	3	2	0	1	7	3	+4	66.67
Taça da Liga	17 November 2022	22 December 2022	Group stage	Quarter-finals	4	2	1	1	8	6	+2	50.00
Total					41	28	8	5	92	47	+45	68.29

Source: Soccerway

=== Liga Portugal 2 ===
==== League table ====
Pos	Team	Pld	W	D	L	GF	GA	GD	Pts	Promotion or relegation
1	Moreirense (C, P)	34	24	7	3	77	38	+39	79	Promotion to Primeira Liga
2	Farense (P)	34	21	6	7	57	34	+23	69	Promotion to Primeira Liga
3	Estrela da Amadora (O, P)	34	16	15	3	55	35	+20	63	Qualification to Promotion play-offs
4	Académico de Viseu	34	14	11	9	51	45	+6	53	
5	Porto B (I)	34	14	9	11	48	40	+8	51	

Updated to match(es) played on 28 May 2023. Source: Liga Portugal 2
Rules for classification: 1) Points; 2) Head-to-head points; 3) Head-to-head goal difference; 4) Head-to-head away goals scored; 5) Goal difference; 6) Matches won; 7) Goals scored; 8) Play-off.
(C) Champions; (I) Ineligible for promotion; (O) Play-off winners; (P) Promoted

==== Results summary ====
Overall								Home						Away					
Pld	W	D	L	GF	GA	GD	Pts	W	D	L	GF	GA	GD	W	D	L	GF	GA	GD
34	24	7	3	77	38	+39	79	15	2	0	49	21	+28	9	5	3	28	17	+11

Source: Liga Portugal

==== Results by round ====
Round	1	2	3	4	5	6	7	8	9	10	11	12	13	14	15	16	17	18	19	20	21	22	23	24	25	26	27	28	29	30	31	32	33	34
Ground	H	A	H	A	H	A	A	H	A	H	A	H	A	H	A	H	A	A	H	A	H	A	H	H	A	H	A	H	A	H	A	H	A	H
Result	W	W	W	W	W	W	D	W	W	W	L	W	D	D	W	W	D	W	W	L	W	D	W	W	W	D	L	W	D	W	W	W	W	W
Position																																		

Source: Liga Portugal
A = Away; H = Home; W = Win; D = Draw; L = Loss

==== Matches ====
The league fixtures were announced on 5 July 2022.
