= André Castro =

Portuguese footballer (born 1988)

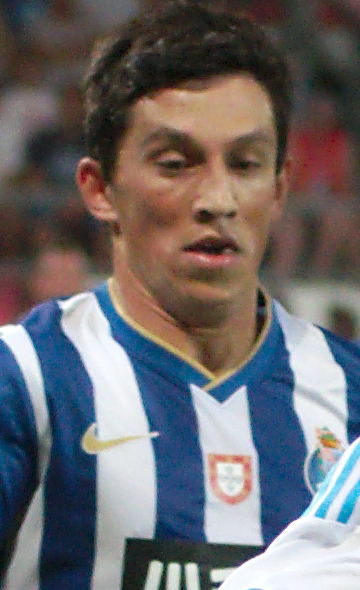
- Castro with Porto in 2013

Personal information
- Full name: André de Castro Pereira
- Date of birth: 2 April 1988 (age 38)
- Place of birth: Gondomar, Portugal
- Height: 1.81 m (5 ft 11 in)
- Position: Midfielder

Team information
- Current team: Porto (assistant)

Youth career
- 1997–1999: Gondomar
- 1999–2007: Porto

Senior career*
Years	Team	Apps	(Gls)
2007–2014	Porto	20	(1)
2008–2010	→ Olhanense (loan)	56	(8)
2011–2012	→ Sporting Gijón (loan)	44	(4)
2013–2014	→ Kasımpaşa (loan)	33	(3)
2014–2017	Kasımpaşa	98	(15)
2017–2020	Göztepe	96	(8)
2020–2024	Braga	69	(3)
2024	Moreirense	15	(1)
2024–2025	Porto B	22	(1)
Total		453	(44)

International career
2004–2005	Portugal U17	10	(0)
2005–2006	Portugal U18	8	(1)
2006–2007	Portugal U19	14	(0)
2007	Portugal U20	6	(0)
2008–2010	Portugal U21	19	(0)
2010	Portugal U23	3	(1)
- * Club domestic league appearances and goals

André de Castro Pereira (born 2 April 1988), known as Castro, is a Portuguese former professional footballer who played as a central midfielder. He is the assistant manager of Primeira Liga club Porto.

Developed at Porto, where he was mainly loaned out, he spent most of his career in Turkey, making 227 Süper Lig appearances and scoring 26 goals for Kasımpaşa and Göztepe. In his country's Primeira Liga, he also played for Olhanense, Braga and Moreirense, totalling 132 games and 11 goals.

== Club career ==
=== Porto ===
Born in Gondomar, Porto District, Castro joined Porto's youth system at the age of 11, from hometown club Gondomar. In 2007, he helped the team conquer the junior championship.

Castro made his first-team – and Primeira Liga – debut on 2 February 2008, coming on as a substitute for Paulo Assunção for the last eleven minutes of a 4–0 home win against União de Leiria. He appeared in a further two official matches during the season.

In the following two years, Castro played with Olhanense on loan, helping the Algarve side return to the top division after an absence of more than 30 years in his debut campaign and also winning several Best Young Player monthly awards during his second, where he scored six goals in 28 games as his team retained their status.

Castro returned to Porto for 2010–11, but was soon deemed surplus to requirements by new manager André Villas-Boas as practically all Portuguese players. In January 2011, after having totalled 106 minutes in six competitive matches, he was loaned to Sporting de Gijón in Spain, making his La Liga debut on the 23rd by playing one minute in a 1–0 home victory over Atlético Madrid.

Castro managed to feature regularly for the Asturians during his spell, starting 11 times and scoring against Mallorca (4–0, away) and Getafe (2–0 at home), in an eventual escape from relegation. In mid-August 2011, another loan spell was arranged. He started in 26 of his 29 league appearances and added another two goals, but his team dropped down a tier.

=== Turkey ===
On 14 August 2013, Castro joined Turkish Süper Lig club Kasımpaşa on loan. The move was made permanent for the 2014–15 season. On 6 May 2017, he scored twice in a 3–1 win at Galatasaray.

Castro signed a three-year contract with Göztepe of the same league on 8 July 2017. He scored four times in his first year, adding nine assists to help to a sixth-place finish one year after promotion.

=== Braga ===
On 28 July 2020, Castro returned to his own country's top flight, on a two-year deal at Braga. Counting two goals and four assists to his name from 66 games, he renewed for a further year at its conclusion.

On 3 October 2023, Castro scored his only UEFA Champions League goal, coming off the bench in the 86th minute and closing the 3–2 away win over Union Berlin in the group stage shortly after.

=== Later career ===
Castro remained in the top tier on 17 January 2024, with the 35-year-old signing for Moreirense until June 2025 after leaving Braga by mutual agreement. He returned to Porto 11 years later on 30 August, being handed the captain's armband at their reserves in the Liga Portugal 2.

At the end of the 2024–25 season, Castro announced his retirement. On 2 July 2025, he was announced as assistant manager of Porto B; however, two months later, he was promoted to the main squad in the same role under Francesco Farioli.

== International career ==
Castro earned 57 caps for Portugal across all youth levels, including 19 for the under-21s. On 5 August 2011, he was called by the full side for a friendly with Luxembourg, but remained an unused substitute.

== Career statistics ==
Appearances and goals by club, season and competition
Club	Season	League			National cup (Note: Includes Taça de Portugal, Turkish Cup)		League cup (Note: Includes Taça da Liga)		Europe		Other		Total	
Club	Season	Division	Apps	Goals	Apps	Goals	Apps	Goals	Apps	Goals	Apps	Goals	Apps	Goals
Porto	2007–08	Primeira Liga	2	0	1	0	0	0	0	0	0	0	3	0
Porto	2010–11	Primeira Liga	1	0	3	0	—		2 (Note: Appearances in UEFA Europa League)	0	—		6	0
Porto	2012–13	Primeira Liga	17	1	3	0	3	0	2 (Note: Appearances in UEFA Champions League)	0	0	0	25	1
Porto	Total		20	1	7	0	3	0	4	0	0	0	34	1
Olhanense (loan)	2008–09	Liga de Honra	28	2	2	0	5	0	—		—		35	2
Olhanense (loan)	2009–10	Primeira Liga	28	6	0	0	1	0	—		—		29	6
Olhanense (loan)	Total		56	8	2	0	6	0	—		—		64	8
Sporting Gijón (loan)	2010–11	La Liga	15	2	0	0	—		—		—		15	2
Sporting Gijón (loan)	2011–12	La Liga	29	2	0	0	—		—		—		29	2
Sporting Gijón (loan)	Total		44	4	0	0	—		—		—		44	4
Kasımpaşa (loan)	2013–14	Süper Lig	33	3	1	0	—		—		—		34	3
Kasımpaşa	2014–15	Süper Lig	32	5	0	0	—		—		—		32	5
Kasımpaşa	2015–16	Süper Lig	33	4	0	0	—		—		—		33	4
Kasımpaşa	2016–17	Süper Lig	33	6	6	1	—		—		—		39	7
Kasımpaşa	Total		98	15	6	1	—		—		—		104	16
Göztepe	2017–18	Süper Lig	33	4	0	0	—		—		—		33	4
Göztepe	2018–19	Süper Lig	31	1	3	0	—		—		—		34	1
Göztepe	2019–20	Süper Lig	32	3	2	1	—		—		—		34	4
Göztepe	Total		96	8	5	1	—		—		—		101	9
Braga	2020–21	Primeira Liga	21	2	4	0	3	0	5	0	—		33	2
Braga	2021–22	Primeira Liga	21	0	1	0	1	0	10	0	—		33	0
Braga	2022–23	Primeira Liga	24	1	5	0	3	0	7 (Note: Five appearances in UEFA Europa League, two appearances and one goal in UEFA Europa Conference League)	1	—		39	2
Braga	2023–24	Primeira Liga	3	0	2	0	0	0	2	1	—		7	1
Braga	Total		69	3	12	0	7	0	24	2	—		112	5
Moreirense	2023–24	Primeira Liga	14	1	0	0	0	0	—		—		14	1
Moreirense	2024–25	Primeira Liga	1	0	0	0	0	0	—		—		1	0
Moreirense	Total		15	1	0	0	0	0	—		—		15	1
Porto B	2024–25	Liga Portugal 2	22	1	—		—		—		—		22	1
Career totals			453	44	33	2	16	0	28	2	0	0	530	48

== Honours ==
Porto

- Primeira Liga: 2007–08, 2010–11, 2012–13
- Taça de Portugal: 2010–11
- Supertaça Cândido de Oliveira: 2012
- UEFA Europa League: 2010–11
- Taça da Liga runner-up: 2012–13

Olhanense

- Segunda Liga: 2008–09

Braga

- Taça de Portugal: 2020–21
