= Godfried Frimpong =

Dutch footballer (born 1999)

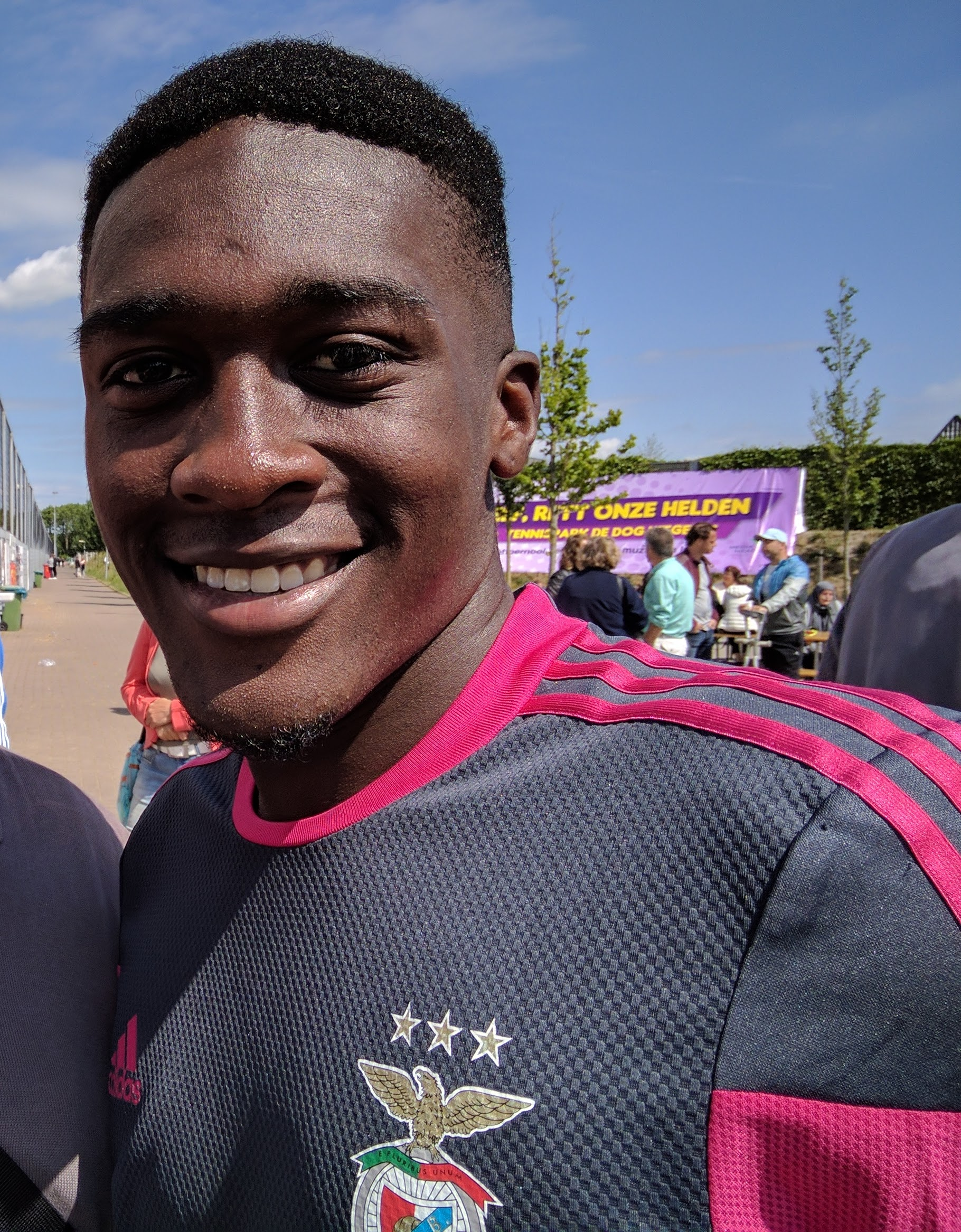

Personal information
- Full name: Godfried Ayesu Owusu Frimpong
- Date of birth: 21 April 1999 (age 27)
- Place of birth: Rotterdam, Netherlands
- Height: 1.80 m (5 ft 11 in)
- Position: Left-back

Team information
- Current team: Kasımpaşa
- Number: 21

Youth career
- –2013: Laakkwartier
- 2014–2015: Sparta
- 2015–2018: Benfica

Senior career*
Years	Team	Apps	(Gls)
2018–2021	Benfica B	40	(1)
2021–2025	Moreirense	103	(2)
2025–	Kasımpaşa	27	(0)

International career^{‡}
2015	Netherlands U16	4	(1)
2016	Netherlands U18	2	(0)
- * Club domestic league appearances and goals as of 10 June 2026 ‡ National team caps and goals as of 16:54, 20 June 2019 (UTC)

Godfried Ayesu Owusu Frimpong (born 21 April 1999) is a Dutch professional footballer who plays as a left-back for Turkish Süper Lig club Kasımpaşa.

== Club career ==
Raised in the Schilderswijk, The Hague, Frimpong left local club HVV Laakkwartier for the Sparta Rotterdam Academy in 2013. From there he moved to the Benfica youth set-up.

Frimpong joined Primeira Liga side Moreirense in July 2021.

On 7 August 2025, Frimpong joined Süper Lig club Kasımpaşa, signing a two-year contract, with an option for a further year.

== International career ==
Born in the Netherlands, Frimpong is of Ghanaian descent. Frimpong is a youth international for the Netherlands.

== Career statistics ==
=== Club ===
As of match played 2 November 2025

Appearances and goals by club, season and competition
Club	Season	League			National cup		League cup		Other		Total	
Club	Season	Division	Apps	Goals	Apps	Goals	Apps	Goals	Apps	Goals	Apps	Goals
Benfica B	2017–18	LigaPro	1	0	—		—		—		1	0
Benfica B	2018–19	LigaPro	11	0	—		—		—		11	0
Benfica B	2019–20	LigaPro	16	1	—		—		—		16	1
Benfica B	2020–21	Liga Portugal 2	12	0	—		—		—		12	0
Benfica B	Total		40	1	—		—		—		40	1
Moreirense	2021–22	Primeira Liga	12	0	0	0	0	0	0	0	12	0
Moreirense	2022–23	Liga Portugal 2	30	0	0	0	1	0	—		31	0
Moreirense	2023–24	Primeira Liga	31	1	0	0	1	0	—		32	1
Moreirense	2024–25	Primeira Liga	30	1	3	0	0	0	—		33	1
Moreirense	Total		103	2	3	0	2	0	0	0	108	2
Kasımpaşa	2025–26	Süper Lig	9	0	0	0	—		—		9	0
Career total			152	3	3	0	2	0	0	0	157	3

== Honours ==
Benfica

- Campeonato Nacional de Juniores: 2017–18
