= Fabiano (footballer, born 2000) =

Brazilian footballer

Personal information
- Full name: Fabiano Josué de Souza Silva
- Date of birth: 14 March 2000 (age 26)
- Place of birth: Presidente Prudente, Brazil
- Height: 1.75 m (5 ft 9 in)
- Position: Right-back

Team information
- Current team: Vitória (on loan from Moreirense)
- Number: 70

Youth career
- 2017: Penapolense
- 2018: Linense
- 2018–2019: Braga

Senior career*
Years	Team	Apps	(Gls)
2017	Penapolense	0	(0)
2019–2020	Braga B	22	(1)
2020–2023	Braga	41	(0)
2020–2021	→ Académica (loan)	25	(1)
2023	→ Kasımpaşa (loan)	9	(0)
2023–	Moreirense	43	(1)
2025	→ Ceará (loan)	40	(0)
2026–	→ Vitória (loan)	1	(0)
- * Club domestic league appearances and goals as of 26 July 2025

Fabiano Josué de Souza Silva (born 14 March 2000), known as Fabiano Souza or just Fabiano, is a Brazilian professional footballer who plays as a right-back for Vitória, on loan from Moreirense.

== Career ==
=== Early career ===
Born in Presidente Prudente, São Paulo, Fabiano played for the youth sides of Penapolense, and made his senior debut with the club in the 2017 Copa Paulista. In 2018, after a short period back to the under-20 side of Linense, he moved abroad with Portuguese side Braga.

=== Braga ===
Fabiano was promoted to the reserves in the Campeonato de Portugal ahead of the 2019–20 season, and scored his first goal for the side on 2 February 2020, netting the opener in a 2–1 away defeat to Fafe. He made his first team debut on 4 July, coming on as a half-time substitute for Diogo Viana in a 4–0 home routing of Desportivo Aves.

==== Loan to Académica ====
On 2 October 2020, Fabiano was loaned to Liga Portugal 2 side Académica de Coimbra. He scored his first professional goal late in the month, netting his side's third in a 3–0 home win over Oliveirense, and finished the season as a starter.

==== Return from loan ====
Upon returning, Fabiano became a regular option for the Minhotas, sharing the starting spot with Yan Couto. After Couto left, he was initially backup to new signing Víctor Gómez, but featured regularly after Gómez was sidelined due to an injury.

==== Loan to Kasımpaşa ====
On 1 February 2023, Fabiano moved to Turkey after agreeing to a six-month loan deal with Kasımpaşa, with a buyout clause. He featured in nine matches for the side, helping them to avoid relegation.

=== Moreirense ===
On 9 August 2023, recently-promoted to Primeira Liga side Moreirense announced the signing of Fabiano on a three-year contract, having paid a reported € 700,000 fee for 50% of the player's economic rights.

== Career statistics ==
=== Club ===
As of 7 January 2025.

Club	Season	League			Cup		League cup		Continental		Other		Total	
Club	Season	Division	Apps	Goals	Apps	Goals	Apps	Goals	Apps	Goals	Apps	Goals	Apps	Goals
Penapolense	2017	Paulista A2	—		—		—		—		10 (Note: Appearance(s) in Copa Paulista)	0	10	0
Braga B	2019–20	Campeonato de Portugal	21	1	—		—		—		—		21	1
Braga B	2020–21	Campeonato de Portugal	1	0	—		—		—		—		1	0
Braga B	Total		22	1	—		—		—		—		22	1
Braga	2019–20	Primeira Liga	2	0	—		—		—		—		2	0
Braga	2021–22	Primeira Liga	27	0	0	0	1	0	7 (Note: Appearance(s) in UEFA Europa League)	0	1 (Note: Appearance(s) in Supertaça Cândido de Oliveira)	0	36	0
Braga	2022–23	Primeira Liga	12	0	2	0	2	0	5	0	—		21	0
Braga	Total		41	0	2	0	3	0	12	0	1	0	59	0
Académica (loan)	2020–21	Liga Portugal 2	25	1	3	0	—		—		—		28	1
Kasımpaşa	2022–23	Süper Lig	9	0	—		—		—		—		9	0
Moreirense	2023–24	Primeira Liga	25	1	1	0	0	0	—		—		26	1
Moreirense	2024–25	Primeira Liga	11	0	1	0	1	0	—		—		13	0
Moreirense	Total		36	1	2	0	1	0	—		—		39	1
Career total			133	3	7	0	4	0	12	0	11	0	167	3

== Honours ==
=== Clubs ===
Ceará

- Campeonato Cearense: 2025
