= Hernâni Infande =

Bissau-Guinean association football player

Personal information
- Full name: Hernâni Infande Tchuda da Silva
- Date of birth: 3 April 2001 (age 25)
- Place of birth: Bissau, Guinea-Bissau
- Height: 1.78 m (5 ft 10 in)
- Position: Winger

Youth career
- –2020: Braga

Senior career*
Years	Team	Apps	(Gls)
2020–2022	Braga B	36	(8)
2021–2023	Braga	4	(0)
2023	→ Paços de Ferreira (loan)	10	(1)
2023–2025	Moreirense	5	(1)
- * Club domestic league appearances and goals as of 16:21, 8 July 2025 (UTC)

Hernâni Infande Tchuda da Silva (born 3 April 2001) is a Bissau-Guinean professional footballer who plays as a winger.

== Club career ==
On 20 September 2020, Infande made his senior debut in the third-tier of Portuguese football for Braga B, scoring in a 3–0 win over Bragança. The following year, he made his professional debut for the first team, coming on as a substitute in a defeat to Roma in the Europa League.

On 31 January 2023, Infande joined Paços de Ferreira on loan until the end of the 2022–23 season. On 8 April, he scored his first Primeira Liga goal, in a 3–1 home loss against Famalicão.

On 1 September 2023, recently promoted to the Primeira Liga club Moreirense announced the signing of Infande on a two-year contract, with Braga keeping 50% of the player's economic rights.

== Career statistics ==
As of match played 17 April 2024

Appearances and goals by club, season and competition
Club	Season	League			Taça de Portugal		Taça da Liga		Continental		Total	
Club	Season	Division	Apps	Goals	Apps	Goals	Apps	Goals	Apps	Goals	Apps	Goals
Braga B	2020–21	Campeonato de Portugal	11	5	—		—		—		11	5
Braga B	2021–22	Liga 3	24	3	—		—		—		24	3
Braga B	2022–23	Liga 3	1	0	—		—		—		1	0
Braga B	Total		36	8	—		—		—		36	8
Braga	2020–21	Primeira Liga	1	0	0	0	0	0	1 (Note: Appearance(s) in UEFA Europa League)	0	2	0
Braga	2021–22	Primeira Liga	0	0	0	0	0	0	0	0	0	0
Braga	2022–23	Primeira Liga	3	0	0	0	4	1	1	0	8	1
Braga	Total		4	0	0	0	4	1	2	0	10	1
Paços de Ferreira (loan)	2022–23	Primeira Liga	10	1	0	0	0	0	—		10	1
Moreirense	2023–24	Primeira Liga	5	1	0	0	0	0	—		5	1
Moreirense	2024–25	Primeira Liga	0	0	0	0	0	0	—		0	0
Moreirense	Total		5	1	0	0	0	0	—		5	1
Career total			55	10	0	0	4	1	2	0	61	11
