= Carlos Ponck =

Cape Verdean footballer (born 1990)

Personal information
- Full name: Carlos dos Santos Rodrigues
- Date of birth: 13 January 1990 (age 36)
- Place of birth: Mindelo, Cape Verde
- Height: 1.83 m (6 ft 0 in)
- Position: Centre-back

Team information
- Current team: AVS
- Number: 26

Youth career
- 2011–2012: Derby
- 2012–2014: Mindelense
- 2014: Quarteirense

Senior career*
Years	Team	Apps	(Gls)
2014–2015	Farense	61	(0)
2015–2018	Benfica	0	(0)
2016	→ Paços Ferreira (loan)	8	(0)
2016	Benfica B	4	(0)
2016–2017	→ Chaves (loan)	7	(0)
2017–2018	→ Aves (loan)	29	(1)
2018–2019	Aves	20	(2)
2019–2023	İstanbul Başakşehir	51	(1)
2022	→ Çaykur Rizespor (loan)	13	(0)
2022–2023	→ Chaves (loan)	21	(0)
2023–2025	Moreirense	24	(0)
2025	Hapoel Be'er Sheva	11	(0)
2025–	AVS	16	(0)

International career
2017–2021	Cape Verde	23	(0)
- * Club domestic league appearances and goals as of 18 May 2026

Carlos dos Santos Rodrigues (born 13 January 1990), known as Carlos Ponck or simply Ponck, is a Cape Verdean professional footballer who plays as a centre-back for Liga Portugal 2 club AVS.

== Club career ==
On 27 July 2014, Ponck made his professional debut with Farense in a 2014–15 Taça da Liga match against Chaves. On 29 December 2015, he joined Portuguese champions Benfica, who loaned him out to Paços de Ferreira in January 2016. He then returned to Benfica to play for their reserve team, playing four matches in LigaPro.

On 31 August 2016, Ponck joined Primeira Liga side Chaves on a season-long loan deal. After playing on loan for Aves in the 2017–18 season, Ponck signed a permanent four-year contract with the club.

On 29 July 2019, Turkish Süper Lig club İstanbul Başakşehir announced the signing of Ponck on a four-year contract. That season, Ponck made 22 league appearances, scoring 1 goal; Başakşehir were crowned Turkish champions for the first time in their history.

On 7 February 2022, Başakşehir sent Ponck on loan to Çaykur Rizespor until the end of the 2021–22 season.

On 1 September 2022, Ponck returned to Portugal, being sent on a season-long loan to his former club Chaves, who had achieved promotion to the Primeira Liga at the end of the previous season.

On 4 September 2023, recently promoted to Primeira Liga club Moreirense announced the signing of Ponck on a three-year contract. In January 2025, following one-and-a-half seasons with Moreirense, he joined Israeli Premier League side Hapoel Be'er Sheva.

On 4 November 2025, Ponck returned to Portugal, signing a contract until the end of the season with AVS, who sat at the bottom of the Primeira Liga table.

== International career ==
Ponck made his international debut for the Cape Verde national team in a 2–0 friendly win over Luxembourg on 28 March 2017.

He was named in the roster for the 2021 Africa cup of nations 2021 when the team reached the round of 16.

== Career statistics ==
=== Club ===
As of match played 27 April 2025

Appearances and goals by club, season and competition
Club	Season	League			National cup (Note: Includes Taça de Portugal, Turkish Cup, Israel State Cup)		League cup (Note: Includes Taça da Liga)		Continental		Other		Total	
Club	Season	Division	Apps	Goals	Apps	Goals	Apps	Goals	Apps	Goals	Apps	Goals	Apps	Goals
Quarteirense	2013–14	Campeonato Nacional de Seniores	11	0	0	0	—		—		—		11	0
Farense	2014–15	Segunda Liga	25	0	0	0	3	0	—		—		28	0
Farense	2015–16	LigaPro	21	0	1	0	1	0	—		—		23	0
Farense	Total		46	0	1	0	4	0	—		—		51	0
Benfica	2015–16	Primeira Liga	0	0	0	0	0	0	0	0	0	0	0	0
Benfica	2016–17	Primeira Liga	0	0	0	0	0	0	0	0	0	0	0	0
Benfica	2017–18	Primeira Liga	0	0	0	0	0	0	0	0	0	0	0	0
Benfica	Total		0	0	0	0	0	0	0	0	0	0	0	0
Paços de Ferreira (loan)	2015–16	Primeira Liga	8	0	0	0	2	0	—		—		10	0
Benfica B	2016–17	LigaPro	4	0	0	0	0	0	0	0	0	0	4	0
Chaves (loan)	2016–17	Primeira Liga	27	0	5	1	1	0	—		—		33	1
Aves (loan)	2017–18	Primeira Liga	29	1	4	0	0	0	—		—		33	1
Aves	2018–19	Primeira Liga	32	2	3	0	1	0	—		0	0	36	2
İstanbul Başakşehir	2019–20	Süper Lig	22	1	2	0	—		9 (Note: One appearance in UEFA Champions League, Eight appearances in UEFA Europa League)	0	—		33	1
İstanbul Başakşehir	2020–21	Süper Lig	23	0	2	0	—		4 (Note: Appearance(s) in UEFA Champions League)	0	1 (Note: Appearance(s) in Turkish Super Cup)	0	30	0
İstanbul Başakşehir	2021–22	Süper Lig	6	0	1	0	—		—		—		7	0
İstanbul Başakşehir	2022–23	Süper Lig	0	0	0	0	—		0	0	—		0	0
İstanbul Başakşehir	Total		51	1	5	0	—		13	0	1	0	70	1
Çaykur Rizespor (loan)	2021–22	Süper Lig	13	0	0	0	—		—		—		13	0
Chaves (loan)	2022–23	Primeira Liga	21	0	1	0	2	0	—		—		24	0
Moreirense	2023–24	Primeira Liga	15	0	1	0	0	0	—		—		16	0
Moreirense	2024–25	Primeira Liga	9	0	3	0	1	0	—		—		13	0
Moreirense	Total		24	0	4	0	1	0	—		—		29	0
Hapoel Be'er Sheva	2024–25	Israeli Premier League	11	0	2	0	0	0	—		—		13	0
AVS	2025–26	Primeira Liga	0	0	0	0	—		—		—		0	0
Career total			277	4	25	1	11	0	13	0	1	0	327	5

=== International ===
As of match played 7 October 2021

Appearances and goals by national team and year
National team	Year	Apps	Goals
Cape Verde	2017	6	0
Cape Verde	2018	5	0
Cape Verde	2019	4	0
Cape Verde	2020	4	0
Cape Verde	2021	4	0
Total		23	0

== Honours ==
Aves

- Taça de Portugal: 2017–18

İstanbul Başakşehir

- Süper Lig: 2019–20

Hapoel Beer Sheva

- Israel State Cup: 2024–25
