= Marcelo (footballer, born 1989) =

Brazilian footballer

Personal information
- Full name: Marcelo dos Santos Ferreira
- Date of birth: 27 July 1989 (age 37)
- Place of birth: São Carlos, Brazil
- Height: 1.82 m (5 ft 11 1/2 in)
- Position: Centre-back

Team information
- Current team: União Leiria
- Number: 44

Youth career
- 2006–2007: Astral EC
- 2007–2009: Vasco da Gama

Senior career*
Years	Team	Apps	(Gls)
2010	Rio Preto	9	(0)
2010–2011	Ribeirão	21	(2)
2011–2018	Rio Ave	152	(6)
2011–2012	→ Leixões (loan)	20	(0)
2018	Sporting CP	0	(0)
2019	Chicago Fire	16	(0)
2020–2021	Paços Ferreira	43	(0)
2021–2022	Al-Tai	26	(1)
2022–2023	Dibba	23	(0)
2023–2026	Moreirense	71	(4)
2026–	União Leiria	26	(3)
- * Club domestic league appearances and goals as of 22:23, 9 November 2026 (UTC)

Marcelo dos Santos Ferreira (born 27 July 1989), known simply as Marcelo, is a Brazilian professional footballer who plays as a centre-back for Liga Portugal 2 club União de Leiria.

== Club career ==
Marcelo was born in São Carlos, São Paulo. After failing to impose himself at CR Vasco da Gama, he joined amateurs Rio Preto Esporte Clube.

In 2010, Marcelo moved to Portugal, signing with G.D. Ribeirão of the third division. For the 2011–12 season he went straight to the Primeira Liga with Rio Ave FC, being immediately loaned to Leixões SC.

Marcelo made his debut in the Portuguese top flight on 18 August 2012, playing the full 90 minutes in a 0–1 home loss against C.S. Marítimo. At the end of the campaign, in which he started in all his 28 appearances (scoring in a 1–0 win at Gil Vicente F.C. on 13 January 2013) to help his team finish in sixth position, he won the club's Player of the Year award.

On 23 May 2018, Marcelo joined Sporting CP on a free transfer and a three-year contract. On 27 December, however, after only one appearance in the Taça de Portugal and another in the Taça da Liga to his credit, he moved to the Major League Soccer with Chicago Fire FC for a reported €500,000 fee.

On 14 January 2020, Marcelo left the Soldier Field by mutual consent. Shortly after, he returned to the Portuguese top tier with F.C. Paços de Ferreira.

Marcelo spent the following two seasons in Western Asia, with Al-Tai FC (Saudi Professional League) and Dibba FC (UAE Pro League). He went back to Portugal and its main division in July 2023, with the 34-year-old signing a one-year contract at recently-promoted side Moreirense FC.

On 16 December 2023, Marcelo extended his link until 2025. He terminated his contract by mutual agreement in January 2026, totalling 76 games during his tenure.

On 16 January 2026, Marcelo joined Liga Portugal 2 club U.D. Leiria on a deal June 2027.

== Career statistics ==
As of match played 11 January 2026

Appearances and goals by club, season and competition
Club	Season	League			State league		National cup (Note: Includes Taça de Portugal, U.S. Open Cup, King's Cup, UAE President's Cup)		League cup (Note: Includes Taça da Liga, UAE League Cup)		Continental		Other		Total	
Club	Season	Division	Apps	Goals	Apps	Goals	Apps	Goals	Apps	Goals	Apps	Goals	Apps	Goals	Apps	Goals
Rio Preto	2010	—			9 (Note: Appearances in Campeonato Paulista Série A2)	0	—		—		—		—		9	0
Ribeirão	2010–11	Segunda Divisão	21	2	—		0	0	—		—		—		21	2
Rio Ave	2011–12	Primeira Liga	0	0	—		0	0	0	0	—		—		0	0
Rio Ave	2012–13	Primeira Liga	28	1	—		1	0	3	0	—		—		32	1
Rio Ave	2013–14	Primeira Liga	24	1	—		7	0	5	0	—		—		36	1
Rio Ave	2014–15	Primeira Liga	14	1	—		1	0	0	0	9 (Note: Appearances in UEFA Europa League)	1	1 (Note: Appearance in Supertaça Cândido de Oliveira)	0	25	2
Rio Ave	2015–16	Primeira Liga	25	2	—		5	1	1	0	—		—		31	3
Rio Ave	2016–17	Primeira Liga	31	1	—		1	0	3	0	2	0	—		37	1
Rio Ave	2017–18	Primeira Liga	30	0	—		4	1	3	1	—		—		37	2
Rio Ave	Total		152	6	—		19	2	15	1	11	1	1	0	198	10
Leixões (loan)	2011–12	Liga de Honra	20	0	—		1	0	0	0	—		—		21	0
Sporting CP	2018–19	Primeira Liga	0	0	—		1	0	1	0	0	0	—		2	0
Chicago Fire	2019	Major League Soccer	16	0	—		1	0	—		—		1 (Note: Appearance in Leagues Cup)	0	18	0
Paços Ferreira	2019–20	Primeira Liga	15	0	—		0	0	0	0	—		—		15	0
Paços Ferreira	2020–21	Primeira Liga	28	0	—		2	1	0	0	—		—		30	1
Paços Ferreira	Total		43	0	—		2	1	0	0	—		—		45	1
Al-Tai	2021–22	Saudi Pro League	26	1	—		1	0	—		—		—		27	1
Dibba	2022–23	UAE Pro League	23	0	—		1	0	1	0	—		—		25	0
Moreirense	2023–24	Primeira Liga	26	2	—		0	0	1	0	—		—		27	2
Moreirense	2024–25	Primeira Liga	33	1	—		3	0	0	0	—		—		36	1
Moreirense	2025–26	Primeira Liga	12	1	—		1	0	—		—		—		13	1
Moreirense	Total		71	4	—		4	0	1	0	—		—		76	4
Career total			372	13	9	0	30	3	18	1	11	1	2	0	442	18

== Honours ==
Sporting CP

- Taça de Portugal: 2018–19
- Taça da Liga: 2018–19

Individual

- Rio Ave Player of the Year: 2012–13
