= Gonçalo Franco =

Portuguese footballer (born 2000)

Personal information
- Full name: Gonçalo Batista Franco
- Date of birth: 17 November 2000 (age 26)
- Place of birth: Porto, Portugal
- Height: 1.76 m (5 ft 9 in)
- Position: Midfielder

Team information
- Current team: Swansea City
- Number: 17

Youth career
- 2008–2010: Boavista
- 2010–2013: Porto
- 2014: Rio Ave
- 2014–2020: Leixões

Senior career*
Years	Team	Apps	(Gls)
2020	Leixões	6	(0)
2020–2024	Moreirense	112	(6)
2024–	Swansea City	92	(5)

International career
2019	Portugal U20	2	(0)
- * Club domestic league appearances and goals as of 19:24, 31 October 2026 (UTC)

Gonçalo Batista Franco (born 17 November 2000) is a Portuguese professional footballer who plays as a midfielder for EFL Championship club Swansea City.

== Club career ==
=== Early career ===
Born in Porto, Franco finished his youth career at Leixões after joining its academy at the age of 13. He made his LigaPro debut with the first team on 4 January 2020, featuring 83 minutes in a 0–1 home loss against Penafiel.

=== Moreirense ===
Franco signed a five-year contract with Primeira Liga club Moreirense in the summer of 2020. He played his first match in the competition on 20 September, coming on as a late substitute in the 2–0 home win over Farense. He scored his first goal the following 10 May, closing the 2–1 away defeat of Portimonense.

During his tenure at the Parque de Jogos Comendador Joaquim de Almeida Freitas, Franco totalled 129 appearances, nine goals and six assists.

=== Swansea City ===
On 12 July 2024, Franco joined EFL Championship side Swansea City on a four-year deal, for an undisclosed fee. He made his debut on 10 August, playing 78 minutes and being booked in the 1–0 away loss to Middlesbrough. He scored his first goal on 26 December as the hosts defeated Queens Park Rangers 3–0, and at the end of his first season was voted both the Swans' Supporters' Player of the Season and Players' Player of the Season.

Franco scored his first goal of the 2025–26 campaign on 30 September 2025, equalising an eventual 2–1 victory at Blackburn Rovers.

== International career ==
Franco won caps for Portugal at under-20 level.

== Personal life ==
Franco's father, Pedro, was also a footballer. A defender, he too represented Moreirense.

== Career statistics ==
As of match played 2 May 2026

Club	Season	League			National cup (Note: Taça de Portugal, FA Cup)		League cup (Note: Taça da Liga, EFL Cup)		Other		Total	
Club	Season	Division	Apps	Goals	Apps	Goals	Apps	Goals	Apps	Goals	Apps	Goals
Leixões	2019–20	LigaPro	6	0	0	0	0	0	—		6	0
Moreirense	2020–21	Primeira Liga	26	1	3	0	—		—		29	1
Moreirense	2021–22	Primeira Liga	23	0	3	1	1	1	2 (Note: Appearances in Primeira Liga relegation play-offs)	0	29	2
Moreirense	2022–23	Liga Portugal 2	30	3	2	0	4	1	—		36	4
Moreirense	2023–24	Primeira Liga	33	2	1	0	1	0	—		35	2
Moreirense	Total		112	6	9	1	6	2	2	0	129	9
Swansea City	2024–25	EFL Championship	40	2	1	0	1	0	—		42	2
Swansea City	2025–26	EFL Championship	45	3	1	0	3	1	—		49	4
Swansea City	Total		85	5	2	0	4	1	—		91	6
Career total			203	11	11	1	10	3	2	0	226	15

== Honours ==
Moreirense

- Liga Portugal 2: 2022–23

Individual

- Liga Portugal 2 Team of the Season: 2022–23
- Liga Portugal 2 Midfielder of the Month: August 2022, October/November 2022
- Swansea City Player of the Year: 2024–25
