= André Luis (footballer, born 1994) =

Brazilian footballer

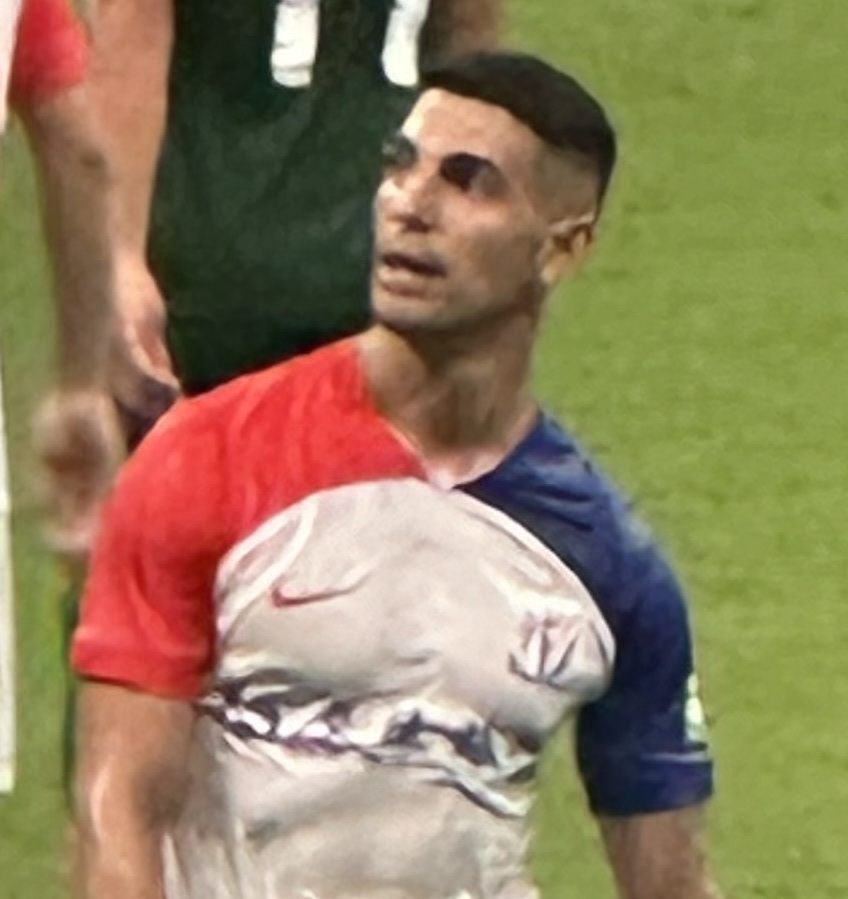
- André Luis in August 2024

Personal information
- Full name: André Luis Silva de Aguiar
- Date of birth: March 9, 1994 (age 32)
- Place of birth: Santarém, Brazil
- Height: 1.84 m (6 ft 0 in)
- Position: Forward

Team information
- Current team: Mirassol
- Number: 99

Senior career*
| Years | Team | Apps | (Gls) |
| 2012–2014 | Grêmio | 1 | (0) |
| 2014–2017 | Botafogo | 0 | (0) |
| 2015–2016 | → Boavista (loan) | 6 | (0) |
| 2017 | Rio Verde | 8 | (5) |
| 2017–2018 | Ypiranga | 13 | (8) |
| 2017 | → Figueirense (loan) | 6 | (2) |
| 2018 | Figueirense | 34 | (7) |
| 2018–2020 | Chaves | 43 | (15) |
| 2020–2024 | Moreirense | 86 | (27) |
| 2024–2025 | Shanghai Shenhua | 51 | (27) |
| 2026– | Mirassol | 8 | (1) |
- * Club domestic league appearances and goals as of 9 April 2026

André Luis Silva de Aguiar (born 9 March 1994), known as just André Luis, is a Brazilian professional footballer who plays as a forward of Mirassol.

== Professional career ==
André Luis began his career in Brazil with Grêmio. André Luis made his professional debut with Grêmio in a 2–1 Campeonato Gaúcho loss to Canoas on 25 January 2013. He then moved to Botafogo where he had various loans in Brazil, before signing with Figueirense in January 2018.

He moved to Portugal with Chaves on 31 August 2018. After a couple seasons with Chaves, he signed with Moreirense on 16 October 2020.

On 28 January 2024, Luis joined Chinese Super League club Shanghai Shenhua. On 3 January 2026, Luis announced his departure after the 2025 season.

On 3 January 2026, Luis joined Campeonato Brasileiro Série A club Mirassol.

== Personal life ==
In April 2019, Luis had a bout of bacterial meningitis, and had to spend three days in an induced coma, followed by two more in intensive care. Afterwards, he had five days of observation with a neurology department. He ended up missing the rest of the 2019–20 season due to the infection.

== Career statistics ==
As of match played 31 December 2025

Appearances and goals by club, season and competition
| Club | Season | League | | | State league | | National cup (Note: Includes Copa do Brasil, Taça de Portugal) | | League cup (Note: Includes Taça da Liga) | | Other | | Total | |
| Club | Season | Division | Apps | Goals | Apps | Goals | Apps | Goals | Apps | Goals | Apps | Goals | Apps | Goals |
|---|---|---|---|---|---|---|---|---|---|---|---|---|---|---|
| Grêmio | 2013 | Série A | 0 | 0 | 1 (Note: Appearance in Campeonato Gaúcho) | 0 | 0 | 0 | — | | 0 | 0 | 1 | 0 |
| Botafogo | 2014 | Série A | 0 | 0 | 0 | 0 | 0 | 0 | — | | 0 | 0 | 0 | 0 |
| Botafogo | 2015 | Série B | 0 | 0 | 0 | 0 | 1 | 0 | — | | — | | 1 | 0 |
| Botafogo | Total | | 0 | 0 | 0 | 0 | 1 | 0 | — | | 0 | 0 | 1 | 0 |
| Boavista (loan) | 2015 | — | | | 0 | 0 | 0 | 0 | — | | 2 (Note: Appearances in Copa Rio) | 1 | 2 | 1 |
| Boavista (loan) | 2016 | Série D | 2 | 0 | 4 (Note: Appearances in Campeonato Carioca) | 0 | — | | — | | 0 | 0 | 6 | 0 |
| Boavista (loan) | Total | | 2 | 0 | 4 | 0 | 0 | 0 | — | | 2 | 1 | 8 | 1 |
| Rio Verde | 2017 | — | | | 8 (Note: Appearances in Campeonato Goiano) | 5 | — | | — | | — | | 8 | 5 |
| Ypiranga | 2017 | Série C | 13 | 8 | — | | 0 | 0 | — | | — | | 13 | 8 |
| Figueirense (loan) | 2017 | Série B | 6 | 2 | — | | 0 | 0 | — | | — | | 6 | 2 |
| Figueirense | 2018 | Série B | 16 | 1 | 18 | 6 | 4 | 2 | — | | — | | 38 | 9 |
| Figueirense | Total | | 22 | 3 | 18 | 6 | 4 | 2 | — | | — | | 44 | 11 |
| Chaves | 2018–19 | Primeira Liga | 16 | 3 | — | | 2 | 2 | 2 | 0 | — | | 20 | 5 |
| Chaves | 2019–20 | LigaPro | 24 | 11 | — | | 4 | 3 | 2 | 2 | — | | 30 | 16 |
| Chaves | 2020–21 | Liga Portugal 2 | 3 | 1 | — | | 0 | 0 | — | | — | | 3 | 1 |
| Chaves | Total | | 43 | 15 | — | | 6 | 5 | 4 | 2 | — | | 53 | 22 |
| Moreirense | 2020–21 | Primeira Liga | 14 | 1 | — | | 2 | 1 | — | | — | | 16 | 2 |
| Moreirense | 2021–22 | Primeira Liga | 30 | 6 | — | | 3 | 1 | 1 | 0 | 2 (Note: Appearances in Primeira Liga relegation play-offs) | 0 | 36 | 7 |
| Moreirense | 2022–23 | Liga Portugal 2 | 27 | 14 | — | | 1 | 0 | 4 | 3 | — | | 32 | 17 |
| Moreirense | 2023–24 | Primeira Liga | 15 | 6 | — | | 1 | 0 | 1 | 1 | — | | 17 | 7 |
| Moreirense | Total | | 86 | 27 | — | | 7 | 2 | 6 | 4 | 2 | 0 | 101 | 33 |
| Shanghai Shenhua | 2024 | Chinese Super League | 28 | 17 | — | | 2 | 0 | 6 | 4 | 1 (Note: Appearance in Chinese Super Cup) | 0 | 37 | 21 |
| Shanghai Shenhua | 2025 | Chinese Super League | 23 | 10 | — | | 2 | 3 | 6 | 1 | 1 | 1 | 32 | 15 |
| Shanghai Shenhua | Total | | 51 | 27 | — | | 4 | 3 | 12 | 5 | 2 | 1 | 69 | 36 |
| Career total | | | 217 | 80 | 31 | 11 | 22 | 12 | 22 | 11 | 6 | 2 | 261 | 116 |

== Honours ==
Moreirense

- Liga Portugal 2: 2022–23

Shenghai Shenhua

- Chinese FA Super Cup: 2024, 2025
