= Artur Jorge (footballer, born 1994) =

Portuguese footballer

Personal information
- Full name: Artur Jorge Marques Amorim
- Date of birth: 14 August 1994 (age 32)
- Place of birth: Braga, Portugal
- Height: 1.86 m (6 ft 1 in)
- Position: Centre-back

Team information
- Current team: Al Shahaniya
- Number: 44

Youth career
- 2004–2013: Braga

Senior career*
Years	Team	Apps	(Gls)
2013–2017	Braga B	59	(4)
2014–2015	→ Vilaverdense (loan)	14	(0)
2015	→ Freamunde (loan)	0	(0)
2016–2018	Braga	20	(0)
2017	→ Mouscron (loan)	0	(0)
2017–2018	→ FCSB (loan)	1	(0)
2018–2020	Vitória Setúbal	51	(0)
2020–2021	APOEL	19	(0)
2021–2022	Moreirense	23	(1)
2022–2023	Al Bataeh	25	(0)
2023–2025	Farense	28	(0)
2025–	Al Shahaniya	12	(0)
- * Club domestic league appearances and goals as of 14:12, 7 June 2026 (UTC)

Artur Jorge Marques Amorim (born 14 August 1994), known as Artur Jorge (Portuguese pronunciation: [aɾˈtuɾ ˈʒɔɾʒɨ]), is a Portuguese professional footballer who plays for Qatar Stars League club Al Shahaniya as a central defender.

Developed at Braga, he made 122 Primeira Liga appearances, also representing in the competition Vitória de Setúbal, Moreirense and Farense. He also played top-flight football in Belgium, Romania, Cyprus and the United Arab Emirates.

== Club career ==
=== Braga ===
Born in Braga, Artur Jorge joined local S.C. Braga's youth system at the age of 10. He started playing as a senior with the B team, going on to spend several seasons with them in the Segunda Liga. Additionally, during 2014–15, he was loaned to Vilaverdense F.C. and S.C. Freamunde.

Artur Jorge made both his main squad and Primeira Liga debut on 19 September 2016, coming on as a 71st-minute substitute for the injured André Pinto in a 3–1 away loss against S.L. Benfica. He contributed a further 15 starts until the end of the season, in a fifth-place finish; on 3 December he was sent off after 35 minutes for conceding a penalty kick in a 1–0 defeat at FC Porto with a foul on André Silva, who missed the attempt. He added four appearances in the Taça da Liga, including a start in the 1–0 final loss to Moreirense F.C. on 29 January 2017.

On 15 August 2017, after renewing his contract for one year and less than one month on loan at Royal Excel Mouscron, Artur Jorge agreed to a season-long loan deal with Romanian club FCSB. His debut came three days later in an away match against SC Juventus București, scoring an own goal after just 13 seconds in an eventual 2–1 win.

=== Vitória Setúbal ===
Artur Jorge returned to his country and its top division on 13 June 2018, joining Vitória F.C. on a three-year contract. He started in all but one of his 30 appearances in his second season, but his team were relegated to the third tier due to irregularities; on 3 August, he scored the only goal at home to Moreirense to reach the League Cup group stage.

=== APOEL and Moreirense ===
In September 2020, Artur Jorge signed a two-year deal with APOEL FC of the Cypriot First Division. He cancelled this arrangement at the halfway point after a runners-up campaign, and signed a three-year deal with Moreirense back home.

Artur Jorge scored the only top-flight goal of his career on 14 May 2022 as the season ended with a 4–1 home victory over F.C. Vizela, putting the Moreira de Cónegos team in the relegation play-offs.

=== Later career ===
Artur Jorge rescinded his contract with the relegated club and went back abroad on 31 July 2022, signing for Al Bataeh Club in the UAE Pro League. He returned to Portugal in summer 2023, on a one-year deal at S.C. Farense.

== Personal life ==
Artur Jorge's father, known by the same name, was also a footballer and a defender. He too played for Braga, and managed the club in two spells.

== Career statistics ==
As of 1 March 2018

Club	Season	League		Cup		League Cup		Europe		Other		Total	
Club	Season	Apps	Goals	Apps	Goals	Apps	Goals	Apps	Goals	Apps	Goals	Apps	Goals
Braga B	2012–13	3	0	0	0	–		–		–		3	0
Braga B	2013–14	7	0	0	0	–		–		–		7	0
Braga B	2015–16	43	3	0	0	–		–		–		43	3
Braga B	2016–17	6	1	0	0	–		–		–		6	1
Total		59	4	0	0	–	–	–	–	–	–	59	4
Vilaverdense (loan)	2014–15	14	0	0	0	–		–		–		14	0
Total		14	0	0	0	–	–	–	–	–	–	14	0
Freamunde (loan)	2014–15	0	0	–		–		–		–		0	0
Total		0	0	–	–	–	–	–	–	–	–	0	0
Braga	2016–17	20	0	2	0	4	0	2	0	–		28	0
Braga	2018–19	0	0	0	0	0	0	0	0	–		0	0
Total		20	0	2	0	4	0	2	0	–	–	28	0
FCSB (loan)	2017–18	1	0	3	0	–		0	0	–		4	0
Total		1	0	3	0	–	–	0	0	–	–	4	0
Career Total		94	4	5	0	4	0	2	0	–	–	105	4
