= Capela (footballer) =

Portuguese footballer

Personal information
- Full name: Fernando Jorge Barbosa Martins
- Date of birth: 28 January 1986 (age 40)
- Place of birth: Arouca, Portugal
- Height: 1.88 m (6 ft 2 in)
- Position: Defensive midfielder

Youth career
- 1999–2005: Arouca

Senior career*
| Years | Team | Apps | (Gls) |
| 2005–2009 | Arouca | 27 | (0) |
| 2009–2011 | Milheiroense | 24 | (0) |
| 2011–2012 | Leixões | 8 | (0) |
| 2012–2013 | Oliveirense | 37 | (0) |
| 2013–2014 | Académico Viseu | 29 | (0) |
| 2014 | Penafiel | 3 | (1) |
| 2015 | Bravos Maquis | 10 | (0) |
| 2015–2018 | Académico Viseu | 107 | (2) |
| 2018–2019 | Famalicão | 24 | (0) |
| 2019–2022 | Penafiel | 62 | (4) |
| 2022–2023 | Académico Viseu | 21 | (0) |
| Total | | 352 | (7) |
- * Club domestic league appearances and goals

Fernando Jorge Barbosa Martins (born 28 January 1986), known as Capela, is a Portuguese former professional footballer who played as a defensive midfielder.

== Club career ==
Born in Arouca, Aveiro District, Capela started playing with local F.C. Arouca, going on to part of the squads that promoted from the regional leagues to the third division in just two years. After two more seasons in amateur football, with G.D. Milheiroense, he moved straight to the Segunda Liga after signing for Leixões SC, making his debut in the competition on 21 August 2011 in a 1–0 away win against Associação Naval 1º de Maio.

In the following years, Capela continued competing in the second tier, joining F.C. Penafiel on 11 June 2014 and scoring the game's only goal in just his third Primeira Liga appearance, at former club Arouca.
