= 2024–25 Moreirense F.C. season =

Moreirense
2024–25 season
- Manager: César Peixoto
- Stadium: Estádio Comendador Joaquim de Almeida Freitas
- Primeira Liga: 8th
- Taça de Portugal: Round of 16
- Taça da Liga: Quarter-finals
- Top goalscorer: League: Luis Nlavo (4); All: Luis Nlavo (5)
- Average home league attendance: 2,387
- All statistics correct as of 21 December 2024.

The 2024–25 season is the 87th season in the history of Moreirense F.C. and their second consecutive season in the Portuguese Primeira Liga. In addition to the domestic league, the club also competed in the Taça de Portugal and the Taça da Liga.

== Transfers ==
=== In ===
Pos.	Player	Transferred from	Fee	Date	Source
MF	(Portugal) Bernardo Martins	(Portugal) AVS	Free	1 July 2024	
FW	(Brazil) Guilherme Schettine	(Russia) Ural Yekaterinburg	Free	15 July 2024	
MF	(Portugal) Pedro Santos	(Portugal) Benfica B	Loan	30 July 2024	
MF	(Brazil) Gabrielzinho	(United Arab Emirates) Al Wasl	Undisclosed	5 August 2024	
DF	(Portugal) Leonardo Buta	(Italy) Udinese	Undisclosed	2 September 2024	

=== Out ===
Pos.	Player	Transferred to	Fee	Date	Source
MF	(Brazil) Wallisson	(Brazil) Athletic Club	Free	1 January 2025	

== Pre-season and friendlies ==
10 July 2024 Friendly	Braga	0–2	Moreirense

13 July 2024 Friendly	Rio Ave	1–2	Moreirense

20 July 2024 Friendly	Moreirense	2–1	União de Leiria

24 July 2024 Friendly	Casa Pia	1–1	Moreirense

27 July 2024 Friendly	Moreirense	2–0	Penafiel

27 July 2024 Friendly	Moreirense	1–1	Chaves

31 July 2024 Friendly	Moreirense	0–0	Paços de Ferreira

3 August 2024 Friendly	Famalicão	3–2	Moreirense

== Competitions ==
=== Overall record ===
Competition	First match	Last match	Starting round	Final position	Record							
Competition	First match	Last match	Starting round	Final position	Pld	W	D	L	GF	GA	GD	Win %
Primeira Liga	11 August 2024	17 May 2025	Matchday 1		15	6	2	7	19	22	−3	40.00
Taça de Portugal	19 October 2024				2	2	0	0	4	2	+2	100.00
Taça da Liga	31 October 2024		Quarter-finals	Quarter-finals	1	0	0	1	0	2	−2	0.00
Total					18	8	2	8	23	26	−3	44.44

Last updated: 21 December 2024
Source: Competitions

=== Primeira Liga ===
==== League table ====
Pos	Team	Pld	W	D	L	GF	GA	GD	Pts
8	Estoril	34	12	10	12	48	53	−5	46
9	Casa Pia	34	12	9	13	39	44	−5	45
10	Moreirense	34	10	10	14	42	50	−8	40
11	Rio Ave	34	9	11	14	39	55	−16	38
12	Arouca	34	9	11	14	35	49	−14	38

Source: Liga Portugal
Rules for classification: 1) Points; 2) Head-to-head points; 3) Head-to-head goal difference; 4) Goal difference; 5) Matches won; 6) Goals scored; 7) Play-off.

==== Results summary ====
Overall								Home						Away					
Pld	W	D	L	GF	GA	GD	Pts	W	D	L	GF	GA	GD	W	D	L	GF	GA	GD
15	6	2	7	19	22	−3	20	4	2	1	10	8	+2	2	0	6	9	14	−5

Last updated: 21 December 2024.

==== Results by round ====
Round	1
Ground	A
Result	W
Position	

Updated to match(es) played on 5 December 2024. Source:
A = Away; H = Home; W = Win; D = Draw; L = Loss

==== Matches ====
The match schedule was released on 7 July 2024.

11 August 2024 1	Farense	1–2	Moreirense

18 August 2024 2	Moreirense	3–1	Arouca	Moreira de Cónegos
				Stadium: Estádio Comendador Joaquim de Almeida Freitas

25 August 2024 3	Braga	3–1	Moreirense	Braga

30 August 2024 4	Moreirense	1–1	Benfica	Moreira de Cónegos
				Stadium: Estádio Comendador Joaquim de Almeida Freitas

14 September 2024 5	Casa Pia	3–1	Moreirense

21 September 2024 6	Moreirense	0–0	Famalicão	Moreira de Cónegos
				Stadium: Estádio Comendador Joaquim de Almeida Freitas

28 September 2024 7	Estrela da Amadora	2–1	Moreirense

5 October 2024 8	Moreirense	1–0	Santa Clara	Moreira de Cónegos
				Stadium: Estádio Comendador Joaquim de Almeida Freitas

26 October 2024 9	Boavista	0–2	Moreirense	Porto
				Stadium: Estádio do Bessa

3 November 2024 10	Vitória de Guimarães	1–0	Moreirense	Guimarães
				Stadium: Estádio D. Afonso Henriques

8 November 2024 11	Moreirense	3–2	Gil Vicente	Moreira de Cónegos
				Stadium: Estádio Comendador Joaquim de Almeida Freitas

30 November 2024 12	Rio Ave	3–2	Moreirense	Vila do Conde
15:30 UTC+0				Stadium: Estádio do Rio Ave FC; Referee: Carlos Macedo

5 December 2024 13	Moreirense	2–1	Sporting CP	Moreira de Cónegos
20:15 UTC+0	Pinto 19'; Guilherme Schettine 35'		Gyökeres 12' (pen.)	Stadium: Estádio Comendador Joaquim de Almeida Freitas; Referee: António Nobre

14 December 2024 14	Nacional	1–0	Moreirense	Funchal
18:00 UTC+0	Gomes 55'			Stadium: Estádio da Madeira; Referee: Sergio Guelho

21 December 2024 15	Moreirense	0–3	Porto	Moreira de Cónegos
20:30			Aghehowa 16'; Mora 66'; Franco 88'	Stadium: Estádio Comendador Joaquim de Almeida Freitas

28 December 2024 16	Estoril	v	Moreirense	Estoril
18:00 UTC+0				Stadium: Estádio António Coimbra da Mota

=== Taça de Portugal ===
19 October 2024 Third round	União de Santarém	1–2	Moreirense	Santarém
				Stadium: Campo Chã das Padeiras

24 November 2024 Fourth round	Moreirense	2–1	Porto	Moreira de Cónegos
				Stadium: Estádio Comendador Joaquim de Almeida Freitas; Referee: Tiago Martins

12 January 2025 Round of 16	Gil Vicente	v	Moreirense	Barcelos
19:45 UTC+0				Stadium: Estádio Cidade de Barcelos

=== Taça da Liga ===
31 October 2024 Quarter-finals	Porto	2–0	Moreirense	Porto
	Buta 34' (o.g.); Eustáquio 61'			Stadium: Estádio do Dragão
