= Caio Secco =

Brazilian footballer (born 1990)

Personal information
- Full name: Caio Gobbo Secco
- Date of birth: 22 December 1990 (age 35)
- Place of birth: Cambé, Brazil
- Height: 1.94 m (6 ft 4 in)
- Position: Goalkeeper

Team information
- Current team: Leixões
- Number: 26

Youth career
- Atlético Mineiro
- Paraná
- Coritiba

Senior career*
Years	Team	Apps	(Gls)
2011–2012	CRB	2	(0)
2012–2013	Vitória	1	(0)
2013	→ Botafogo-BA (loan)	8	(0)
2013	Parma	0	(0)
2013–2015	Crotone	17	(0)
2015	→ San Marino (loan)	16	(0)
2015–2016	Lupa Castelli Romani	20	(0)
2016–2020	Feirense	85	(0)
2020–2021	Marítimo	2	(0)
2021–2023	Penafiel	57	(0)
2023–2026	Moreirense	20	(0)
2026–	Leixões	0	(0)
- * Club domestic league appearances and goals as of 6 September 2026

Caio Gobbo Secco (born 20 December 1990) is a Brazilian professional footballer who plays as a goalkeeper for Liga Portugal 2 club Leixões. He also holds an Italian passport.

== Club career ==
Born in Cambé, Paraná, Secco graduated from local Coritiba's youth setup, and after a trial at VVV-Venlo, he joined CRB.

On 25 June 2012, Secco moved to Vitória. On 21 July, he made his professional debut, replacing injured Gustavo in a 1–0 home success against Atlético-PR.

On 6 December, Secco signed a new six-month deal with Vitória, and was subsequently loaned to Botafogo-BA. After the loan, his link expired and he joined Serie A club Parma in a four-year deal, being subsequently sold to Crotone in co-ownership deal.

On 14 January 2015, he was signed by San Marino Calcio in a temporary deal.

On 2 September 2020, Caio Secco signed with Marítimo.

On 29 June 2021, he moved to Penafiel.

On 6 June 2023, recently-promoted to Primeira Liga side Moreirense announced the free signing of Secco on a two-year contract.

== Honours ==
Individual

- Primeira Liga Goalkeeper of the Month: August 2018, September 2018
