= Rúben Ismael =

Portuguese footballer

Personal information
- Full name: Rúben Ismael Valente Ramos
- Date of birth: 25 March 1999 (age 27)
- Place of birth: Estarreja, Portugal
- Height: 1.84 m (6 ft 1/2 in)
- Position: Defensive midfielder

Team information
- Current team: Vitória
- Number: 16

Youth career
- 2009–2016: Estarreja
- 2011–2013: Beira-Mar
- 2013–2016: Oliveirense
- 2016–2019: Feirense

Senior career*
Years	Team	Apps	(Gls)
2019–2025	Moreirense	57	(1)
2019–2020	→ Felgueiras (loan)	10	(0)
2020–2021	→ Mafra (loan)	22	(0)
2023	→ Nacional (loan)	13	(0)
2025–	Vitória	1	(0)
- * Club domestic league appearances and goals as of 8 November 2025

Rúben Ismael Valente Ramos, known as Rúben Ismael (born 25 March 1999) is a Portuguese professional footballer who plays as a defensive midfielder for Campeonato Brasileiro Série A club Vitória.

== Football career ==
On 13 September 2020, Ismael made his professional debut with Mafra in a Liga Portugal 2 match against Cova da Piedade.

On 23 January 2023, he was sent on loan to Nacional until the end of the 2022–23 season.

On 17 July 2025, Ismael joined Campeonato Brasileiro Série A club Vitória on a contract until the end of 2028.
