= Pedro Aparício =

Portuguese footballer (born 1995)

Personal information
- Full name: Pedro Miguel Santos Aparício
- Date of birth: 22 August 1995 (age 31)
- Place of birth: Aveiro, Portugal
- Height: 1.71 m (5 ft 7 in)
- Position: Midfielder

Team information
- Current team: Petro de Luanda
- Number: 20

Youth career
- 2004–2014: Beira-Mar

Senior career*
Years	Team	Apps	(Gls)
2014–2016	Gafanha	61	(7)
2016–2017	Águeda	17	(3)
2017–2021	Beira-Mar	111	(26)
2021–2022	Mafra	31	(0)
2022–2024	Moreirense	48	(7)
2024–	Petro de Luanda		
- * Club domestic league appearances and goals as of 26 July 2024

Pedro Miguel Santos Aparício (born 22 August 1995) is a Portuguese professional footballer who plays as a midfielder for Girabola club Petro de Luanda.

== Professional career ==
Aparício is a youth product of Beira-Mar's youth academy. In 2014, he began his senior career with Gafanha in the Campeonato de Portugal. In 2016, he moved to Águeda for one season, before returning to Beira-Mar where he stayed for 4 seasons. On 30 June 2020, he extended his contract with Beira-Mar for another season. On 17 July 2021, he moved to the Liga Portugal 2 with Mafra. On 1 June 2022, he moved to Moreirense for 1+1 seasons. He helped Moreirense win the 2022–23 Liga Portugal 2, and on 19 May 2023 the contract to extend his contract was activated.

== Honours ==
Moreirense

- Liga Portugal 2: 2022–23
