= Alan (footballer, born 2000) =

Brazilian footballer

Personal information
- Full name: Alan de Souza Guimarães
- Date of birth: 8 March 2000 (age 26)
- Place of birth: São Paulo, Brazil
- Height: 1.61 m (5 ft 3 in)
- Position: Attacking midfielder

Team information
- Current team: Vitória de Guimarães
- Number: 10

Youth career
- –2013: São Caetano
- 2014–2020: Palmeiras

Senior career*
Years	Team	Apps	(Gls)
2020–2023	Palmeiras	0	(0)
2020	→ Guarani (loan)	3	(0)
2021	→ Operário Ferroviário (loan)	11	(1)
2022	→ Sport Recife (loan)	12	(0)
2022–2023	→ Moreirense (loan)	30	(6)
2023–2026	Moreirense	97	(15)
2026–	Vitória de Guimarães	0	(0)

International career^{‡}
2016–2017	Brazil U17	25	(6)
2018	Brazil U20	3	(0)
- * Club domestic league appearances and goals as of 6 September 2026 ‡ National team caps and goals as of 13:39, 5 October 2020 (UTC)

Alan de Souza Guimarães (born 8 March 2000), simply known as Alan or Alanzinho, is a Brazilian footballer who plays as an attacking midfielder for Primeira Liga club Vitória de Guimarães.

== Career statistics ==
=== Club ===
As of match played 6 October 2023

Appearances and goals by club, season and competition
Club	Season	League			State league		National cup		League cup		Other		Total	
Club	Season	Division	Apps	Goals	Apps	Goals	Apps	Goals	Apps	Goals	Apps	Goals	Apps	Goals
Palmeiras	2020	Série A	0	0	0	0	0	0	—		0	0	0	0
Guarani (loan)	2020	Série B	3	0	0	0	—		—		—		3	0
Operário Ferroviário (loan)	2021	Série B	11	1	0	0	0	0	—		—		11	1
Sport (loan)	2022	Série B	9	0	3 (Note: Appearances in Campeonato Pernambucano)	0	0	0	—		4 (Note: Appearances in Copa do Nordeste)	1	16	1
Moreirense (loan)	2022–23	Liga Portugal 2	30	6	—		3	1	4	1	—		37	8
Moreirense	2023–24	Primeira Liga	8	2	—		0	0	1	0	—		9	2
Moreirense	Total		38	8	—		3	1	5	1	—		46	10
Career total			61	9	3	0	3	1	5	1	4	1	76	12

== Honours ==
Moreirense

- Liga Portugal 2: 2022–23
