= Madson (footballer, born 1999) =

Brazilian footballer

Personal information
- Full name: Madson de Souza Silva
- Date of birth: 26 August 1999 (age 27)
- Place of birth: Curitiba, Brazil
- Height: 1.65 m (5 ft 5 in)
- Position: Forward

Team information
- Current team: Juárez
- Number: 9

Youth career
- –2018: Joinville
- 2019: Corinthians

Senior career*
Years	Team	Apps	(Gls)
2017–2018	Joinville	32	(0)
2018–2019	Coimbra	0	(0)
2019	→ Atlético Goianiense (loan)	12	(1)
2019–2022	Corinthians	2	(0)
2020	→ Fortaleza (loan)	5	(0)
2020	→ Oeste (loan)	1	(0)
2021	→ Santa Cruz (loan)	10	(0)
2021–2022	→ Estrela da Amadora (loan)	27	(3)
2022–2024	Moreirense	69	(11)
2025–	Juárez	8	(3)
- * Club domestic league appearances and goals as of 29 March 2025

Madson de Souza Silva (born 26 August 1999), known as simply Madson, is a Brazilian professional footballer who plays as a forward for Liga MX club Juárez.

== Professional career ==
Madson made his professional debut with Corinthians in a 2-1 Campeonato Paulista loss to Ponte Preta on 30 January 2020.

On 1 September 2021, he joined Estrela da Amadora in Liga Portugal 2 on loan.

On 11 July 2022, Madson signed a four-year contract with Moreirense.

== Honours ==
Atlético Goianiense

- Campeonato Goiano: 2019
