= Dinis Pinto =

Portuguese footballer (born 2000)

Personal information
- Full name: Dinis Lourenço Casals Namura Borges Pinto
- Date of birth: 24 August 2000 (age 26)
- Place of birth: Porto, Portugal
- Height: 1.78 m (5 ft 10 in)
- Position: Right-back

Team information
- Current team: Moreirense
- Number: 76

Youth career
- 2010–2016: Hernâni Gonçalves
- 2016–2017: Paços de Ferreira
- 2017–2019: Penafiel

Senior career*
Years	Team	Apps	(Gls)
2019–2021	Lusitânia	37	(1)
2021–2023	Braga B	47	(2)
2021–2023	Braga	2	(0)
2023–	Moreirense	69	(3)
- * Club domestic league appearances and goals as of 20 September 2026

Dinis Lourenço Casals Namura Borges Pinto (born 24 August 2000) is a Portuguese professional footballer who plays as a right-back for and captains Primeira Liga club Moreirense.

== Professional career ==
Pinto is a youth product of Hernâni Gonçalves, Paços de Ferreira, and Penafiel. He began his senior career with Lusitânia, before signing with Braga on 20 July 2021. He made his professional debut for Braga as a late sub in a 6–0 Primeira Liga win over Arouca on 30 December 2021.

On 29 June 2023, recently-promoted to Primeira Liga side Moreirense announced the free signing of Pinto on a three-year contract.
