= Kobamelo Kodisang =

South African soccer player

Personal information
- Date of birth: 28 August 1999 (age 27)
- Place of birth: Seraleng, South Africa
- Height: 1.69 m (5 ft 7 in)
- Position: Right winger

Team information
- Current team: Mamelodi Sundowns

Youth career
- –2015: Platinum Stars

Senior career*
Years	Team	Apps	(Gls)
2015–2017	Platinum Stars	19	(0)
2017–2019	Bidvest Wits	4	(1)
2018–2019	→ Sanjoanense (loan)	23	(4)
2019–2022	Braga B	56	(16)
2022–2023	Braga	1	(0)
2022–2023	→ Moreirense (loan)	29	(11)
2023–2024	Moreirense	31	(1)
2024–	Mamelodi Sundowns	7	(0)
2025–2026	→ AVS (loan)	4	(0)

International career^{‡}
2015	South Africa U17	3	(0)
2017–2019	South Africa U20	14	(0)
2019–2021	South Africa U23	8	(1)
2023–	South Africa	1	(0)
- * Club domestic league appearances and goals as of 25 October 2025 ‡ National team caps and goals as of 10 October 2023

Kobamelo Kodisang (born 28 August 1999) is a South African professional soccer player who plays as a right winger for Premier Soccer League club Mamelodi Sundowns, and the South Africa national football team. He became one of the youngest players to ever play in the Premier Soccer League when he made his debut at the age of 15 in August 2015.

== Club career ==
Born in the small town of Seraleng (near Rustenburg), Kodisang was first discovered at the age of ten by Cavin Johnson, then-manager of Platinum Stars. He joined the youth team shortly after, and initially received media attention after an impressive performance at the 2014/15 MultiChoice Diski Challenge tournament, including scoring two goals to lead his team to a comeback win against Orlando Pirates.

He was called up to the senior squad for the 2015–16 season, and made his professional debut on 26 August 2015, replacing Robert Ng'ambi after the 85th minute of a 2–0 win against Golden Arrows. At the age of 15 years, 363 days, he became one of the youngest players to ever play in the Premier Soccer League, and the youngest in the past six years.

Kodisang was signed by Portuguese club Sanjoanense on 28 September 2018 on a season-long loan deal. In mid-August 2019, he joined S.C. Braga B.

On 2 August 2022, Kodisang joined Moreirense in Liga Portugal 2 on a season-long loan, with an option to buy.

On 28 June 2023, after achieving promotion to the Primeira Liga, Moreirense announced the permanent signing of Kodisang on a four-year contract, for a reported fee of €500.000.

== International career ==
Kodisang was selected to represent the South African national under-17 team at the 2015 FIFA U-17 World Cup in Chile, and played in all three matches (against Costa Rica, North Korea and Russia). South Africa, however, got eliminated in the group stage with a record of one draw, two losses.

Kodisang made his debut for the South Africa senior team on 9 September 2023, starting in a 0–0 draw at home to Namibia, in a friendly match.

== Honours ==
Moreirense

- Liga Portugal 2: 2022–23

Individual

- Liga Portugal 2 Team of the Season: 2022–23
