= Kewin (footballer) =

Brazilian footballer

Personal information
- Full name: Kewin Oliveira Silva
- Date of birth: 25 January 1995 (age 31)
- Place of birth: São Paulo, Brazil
- Height: 1.89 m (6 ft 2 in)
- Position: Goalkeeper

Team information
- Current team: Fagiano Okayama
- Number: 23

Senior career*
Years	Team	Apps	(Gls)
2013−2019	Red Bull Brasil	2	(0)
2014	→ América (SP) (loan)	16	(0)
2017	→ Boa (loan)	0	(0)
2017	→ Mirassol (loan)	0	(0)
2019	Red Bull Bragantino	1	(0)
2020−2021	Mirassol	14	(0)
2020−2021	→ Moreirense (loan)	2	(0)
2021–2025	Moreirense	105	(0)
2025–2026	Damac	34	(0)
2026–	Fagiano Okayama	0	(0)
- * Club domestic league appearances and goals as of 3 June 2025

Kewin Oliveira Silva (born 25 January 1995), known simply as Kewin, is a Brazilian professional footballer who plays as a goalkeeper for J1 League club Fagiano Okayama.

== Professional career ==
Born in São Paulo, Kewin began his footballing career as a futsal goalkeeper in a football club in Éden (Sorocaba). He then went to the club of Red Bull Bragantino II. Kewin made his professional debut with Red Bull Bragantino in a 1−0 Campeonato Brasileiro Série B loss to Coritiba on 24 November 2019. In 2020 he signed with Mirassol, and in July of that year was loaned to Moreirense in the Primeira Liga.

On 27 August 2025, Kewin joined Saudi Pro League club Damac.

== Honours ==
Red Bull Bragantino

- Série B: 2019

Individual

- Liga Portugal 2 Goalkeeper of the Month: September 2022
