= Lawrence Ofori =

Ghanaian footballer

Personal information
- Date of birth: 28 June 1998 (age 28)
- Place of birth: Ghana
- Height: 1.81 m (5 ft 11 in)
- Position: Midfielder

Team information
- Current team: Casa Pia
- Number: 80

Senior career*
Years	Team	Apps	(Gls)
2016	West African Football Academy	2	(0)
2017–2019	Leixões	17	(0)
2019	→ Feirense (loan)	8	(0)
2019–2023	Famalicão	9	(0)
2020–2021	→ Arouca (loan)	26	(1)
2022	→ Ashod (loan)	11	(0)
2022–2023	→ Moreirense (loan)	32	(5)
2023–2026	Moreirense	60	(2)
2026–	Casa Pia	12	(0)
- * Club domestic league appearances and goals as of 18 May 2026

Lawrence Ofori (born 28 June 1998) is a Ghanaian professional footballer who plays as a midfielder for Portuguese club Casa Pia.

== Career ==
Ofori has played for West African Football Academy, Leixões, Feirense and Famalicão. In February 2022 he moved on loan to Ashod.

For the 2022–23 season, Ofori was loaned to Moreirense in Liga Portugal 2. On 27 June 2023, after achieving promotion to the Primeira Liga, Moreirense announced the permanent signing of Ofori on a three-year contract.

On 18 January 2026, Ofori terminated his contract with Moreirense by mutual agreement and joined fellow Primeira Liga club Casa Pia on a deal until June 2027.

== Honours ==
Moreirense

- Liga Portugal 2: 2022–23

Individual

- Liga Portugal 2 Team of the Season: 2022–23
- Liga Portugal 2 Midfielder of the Month: March 2023, April 2023
