= Leonardo Buta =

Portuguese footballer (born 2002)

Personal information
- Full name: Leonardo Daniel Ulineia Buta
- Date of birth: 5 June 2002 (age 24)
- Place of birth: Anadia, Portugal
- Height: 1.82 m (6 ft 0 in)
- Position: Left-back

Team information
- Current team: Red Star
- Number: 25

Youth career
- –2014: CB Estarreja
- 2014–2015: Benfica
- 2015–2017: Anadia
- 2017–2018: Palmeiras FC
- 2018–2021: SC Braga

Senior career*
Years	Team	Apps	(Gls)
2020–2022	Braga B	15	(0)
2021–2022	Braga	5	(0)
2022–2026	Udinese	2	(0)
2023–2024	→ Gil Vicente (loan)	29	(0)
2024–2025	→ Moreirense (loan)	7	(0)
2025–2026	→ Eibar (loan)	14	(0)
2026	→ Rio Ave (loan)	3	(0)
2026–	Red Star	0	(0)

International career
2018–2019	Portugal U17	5	(0)
2019–2020	Portugal U18	10	(0)
2022	Portugal U20	1	(1)
2023	Portugal U21	3	(0)
- * Club domestic league appearances and goals as of 1 July 2026

Leonardo Daniel Ulineia Buta (born 5 June 2002) is a Portuguese professional footballer who plays as a left-back or winger for Ligue 2 club Red Star.

== Club career ==
Having grown through the youth ranks and reserve team of SC Braga, Leonardo Buta made his professional debut for the club on the 12 February 2022, replacing Bruno Rodrigues at the 56th minute of a 2–1 home Primeira Liga win against Paços de Ferreira.

On 5 June 2022, Buta signed a five-year contract with Udinese in Italy.

On 18 July 2023, Udinese sent Buta on a season-long loan to Primeira Liga side Gil Vicente.

On 2 September 2024, Buta moved to Moreirense, with Udinese announcing it as a permanent transfer. However, that move was retroactively reported as a loan.

On 24 July 2025, Buta was loaned to Eibar in Spain. During the second half of that season, he returned to Portugal, joining Primeira Liga side Rio Ave on loan.

== International career ==
Buta is a youth international for Portugal, playing with the under-17 during the 2018–19 season.

== Personal life ==
Born in a family of Angolan descent, Leonardo is the younger brother of professional footballer Aurélio Buta.
