= Moreira de Cónegos =

- Civil parish
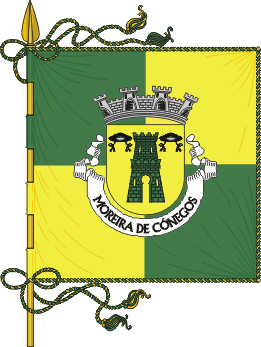
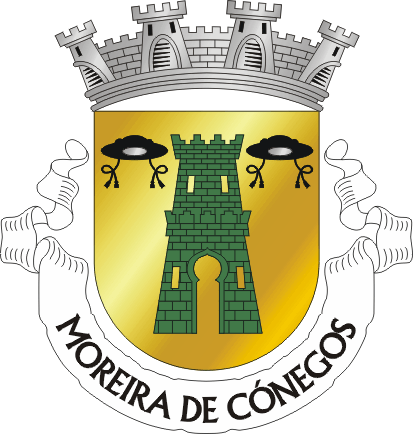
- Flag Coat of arms

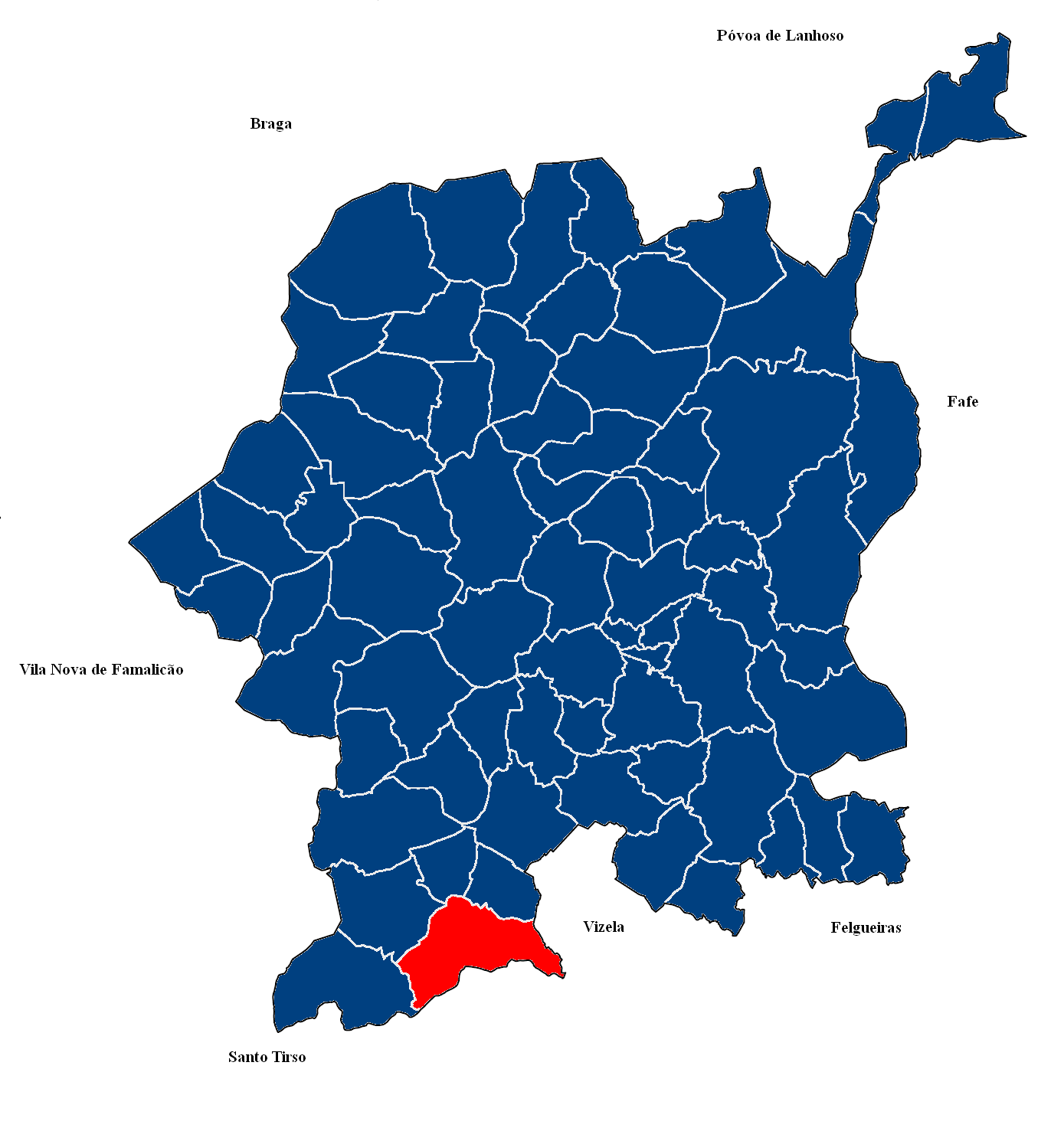
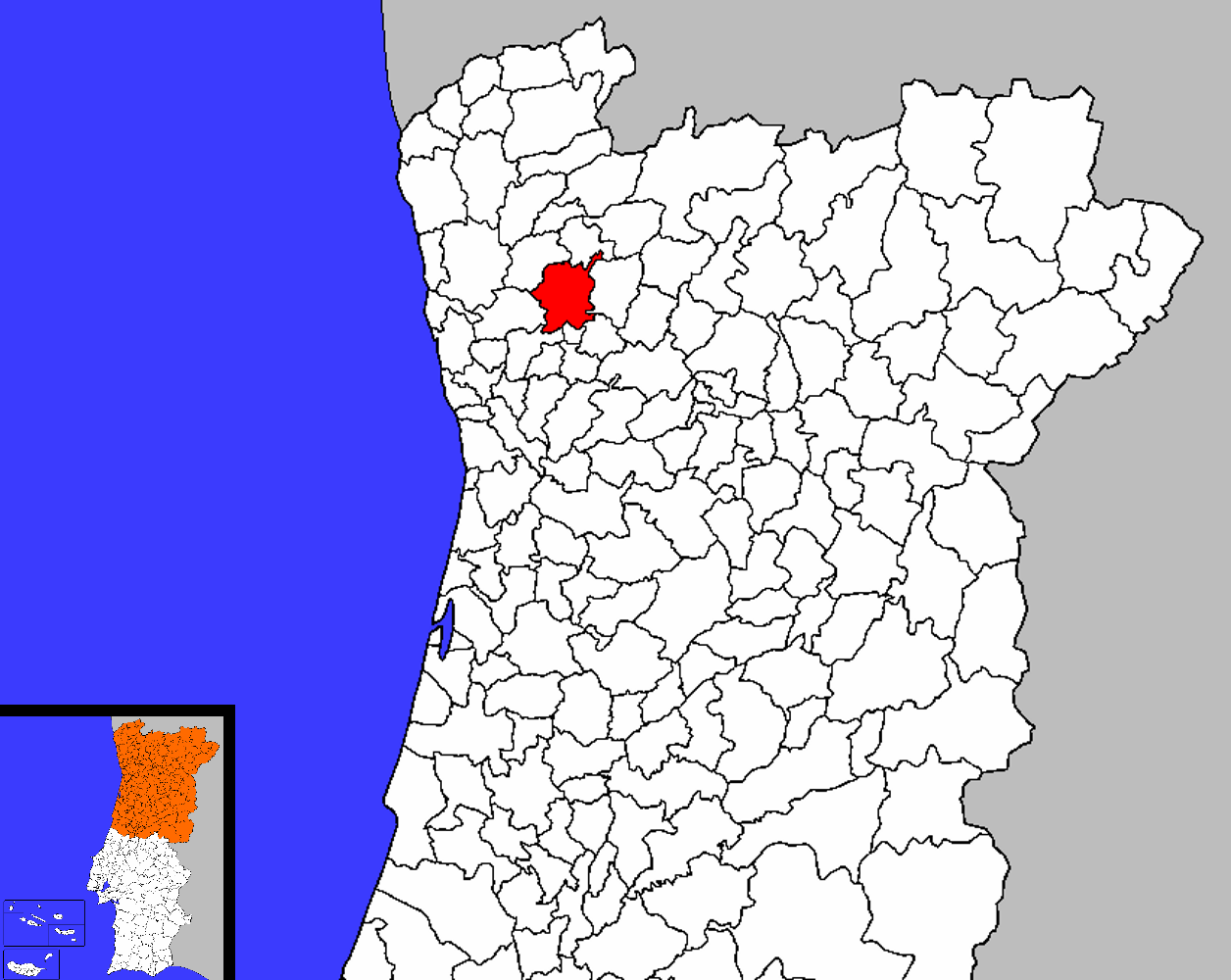
- Coordinates: 41.382°N 8.336°W
- Country: Portugal
- Region: Norte
- Intermunic. comm.: Ave
- District: Braga
- Municipality: Guimarães

Area
  - Total: 4.72 km^{2} (1.82 sq mi)

Population (2021)
  - Total: 4,652
  - Density: 986/km^{2} (2,550/sq mi)
- Time zone: UTC+00:00 (WET)
  - Summer (DST): UTC+01:00 (WEST)

Moreira de Cónegos (Portuguese pronunciation: [muˈɾɐjɾɐ ðɨ ˈkɔnɨɣuʃ]) is a Portuguese freguesia ("civil parish") and town in the municipality of Guimarães which is in the Braga District in northern Portugal. The population in 2021 was 4,652, in an area of 4.72 km².

== Sports ==
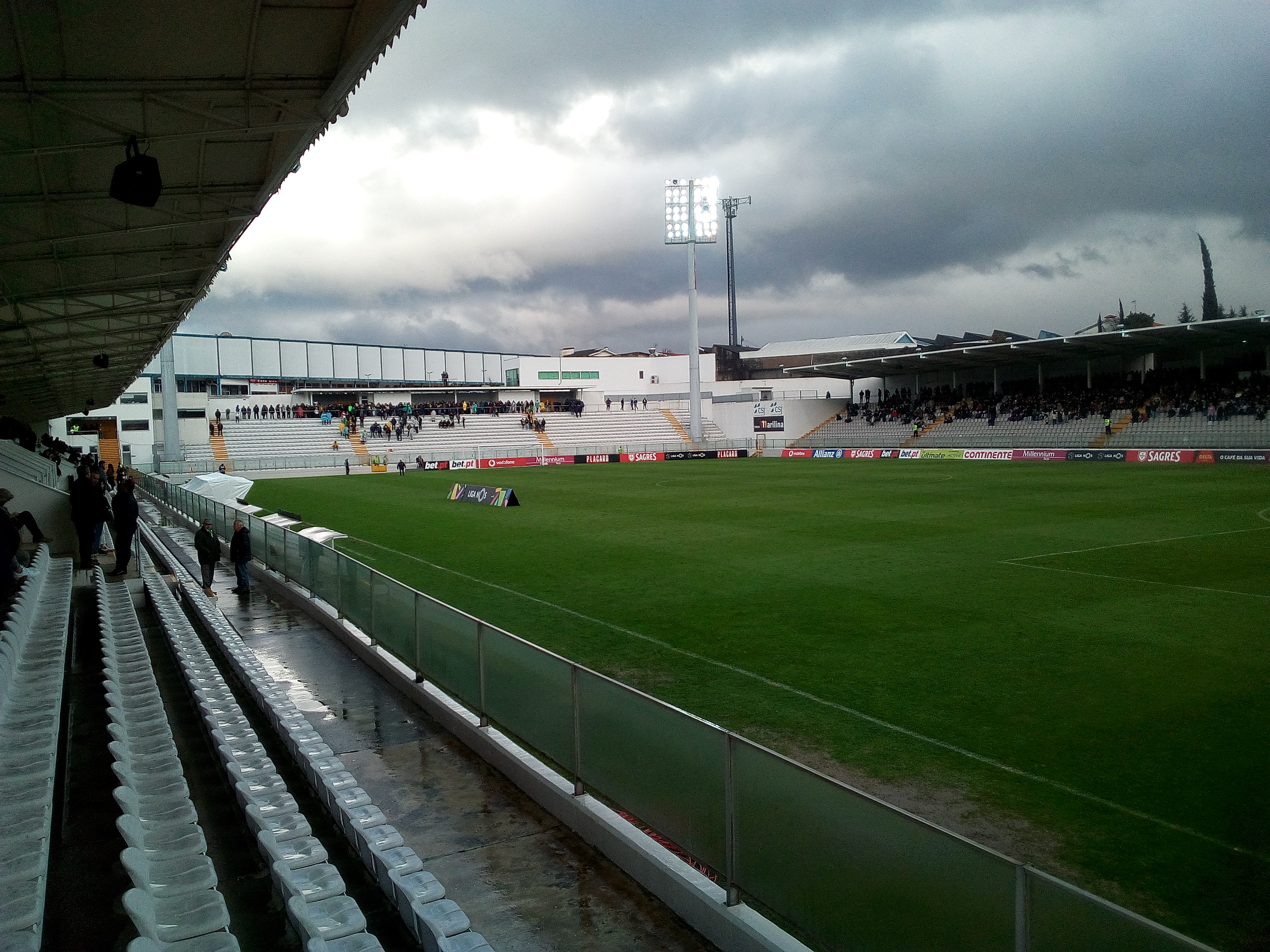
Parque de Jogos Comendador Joaquim de Almeida Freitas

The town is known for its football club of Moreirense who currently plays in Portugal's top division of professional football which is the Primeira Liga.
