= Parque de Jogos Comendador Joaquim de Almeida Freitas =

Stadium in Moreira de Cónegos, Portugal

Coordinates: 41°22′41″N 8°21′17″W

Parque Joaquim de Almeida Freitas
- Parque Moreira de Cónegos
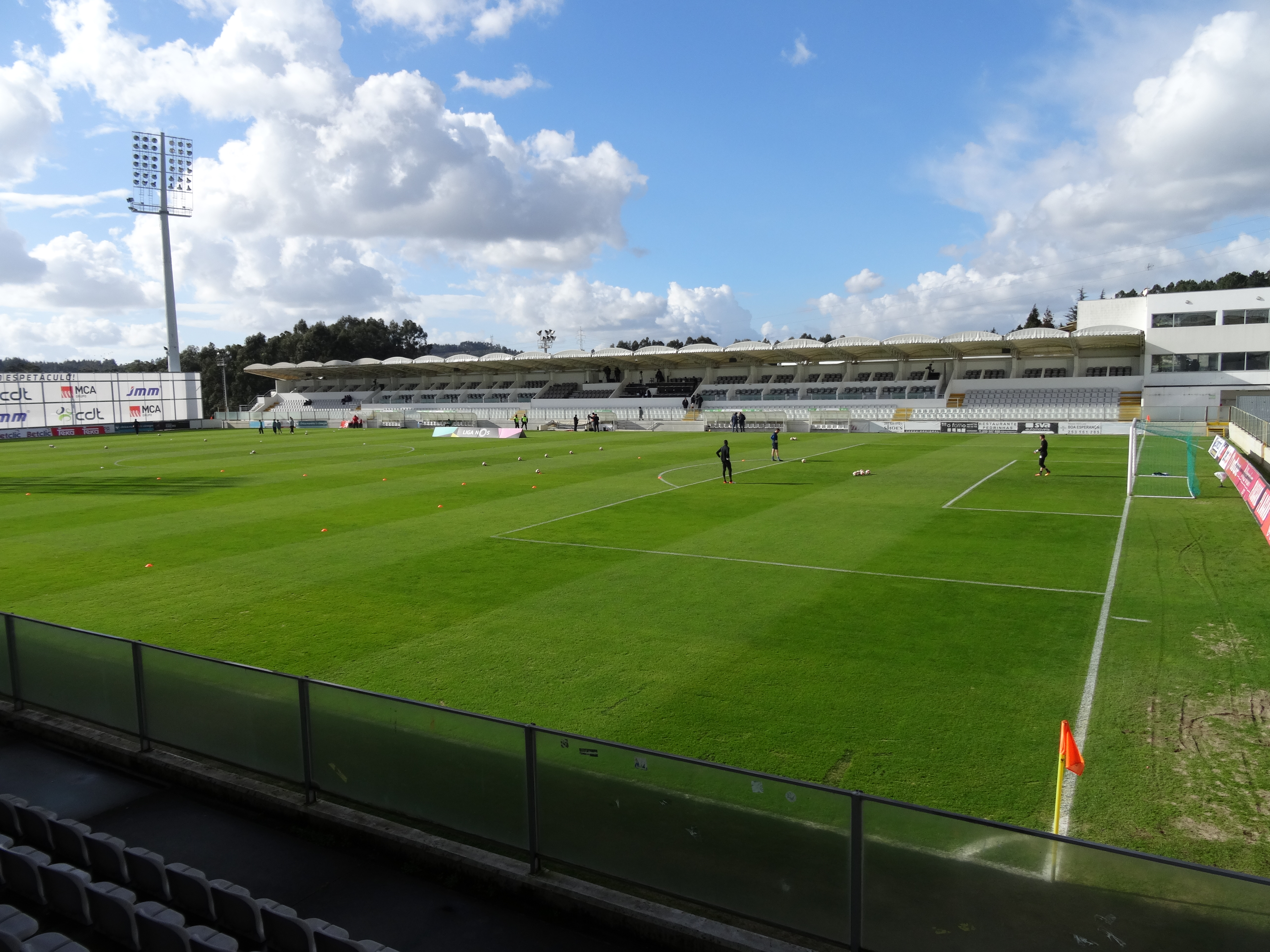
- Interactive map of Parque Joaquim de Almeida Freitas
- Full name: Parque de Jogos Comendador Joaquim de Almeida Freitas
- Location: Moreira de Cónegos, Portugal
- Owner: Moreirense
- Capacity: 6,150
- Surface: Grass
- Field size: 104 x 68 metres

Construction
- Built: 2002
- Opened: 2002
- Architect: Eng. Portilha

Tenant
- Moreirense

Parque de Jogos Comendador Joaquim de Almeida Freitas is a multi-use stadium in Moreira de Cónegos, Guimarães, Portugal. It is currently used for football matches and is the home stadium of Moreirense.

The stadium was constructed in 2002 as a result of two successful back to back promotions by the club. The stadium was constructed to play host to Moreirense's home games in the 2002-03 Primeira Liga season. During the season the club came under great criticism due to its lighting towers as well as its safety conditions around the ground. This led the club to leave the stadium temporarily for a few weeks so that the League association can investigate whether the appropriate facilities and conditions were in place to ensure the safety of the supporters and the players. The stadium was later deemed safe to play in.
