= 2023–24 F.C. Arouca season =

F.C. Arouca
2023–24 season
- Chairman: Carlos Pinho
- Manager: Daniel Ramos (until 15 November); Daniel Sousa (from 15 November)
- Stadium: Estádio Municipal
- Primeira Liga: 7th
- Taça de Portugal: Fifth round
- Taça da Liga: Third round
- UEFA Europa Conference League: Third qualifying round
- Top goalscorer: League: Rafa Mújica (20); All: Rafa Mújica (23)
- Biggest win: Arouca 5–0 Vizela
- Biggest defeat: Arouca 0–3 Benfica
- All statistics correct as of 12 May 2024.

The 2023–24 season is F.C. Arouca's 73rd season in existence and third consecutive in the Primeira Liga, the top division of association football in Portugal. They are also competing in the Taça de Portugal, the Taça da Liga and the UEFA Europa Conference League.

== Players ==
=== First-team squad ===
As of 31 January 2024

Note: Flags indicate national team as defined under FIFA eligibility rules; some limited exceptions apply. Players may hold more than one non-FIFA nationality.

No.	Pos.	Nation	Player
1	GK	POR	João Valido
2	MF	GUI	Morlaye Sylla
3	DF	GHA	Jerome Opoku
5	MF	POR	David Simão
6	DF	BRA	Mateus Quaresma
7	FW	NGR	Yusuf Lawal
8	MF	CIV	Eboue Kouassi
10	FW	ESP	Jason
11	FW	ESP	Miguel Puche
12	GK	URU	Ignacio de Arruabarrena
14	MF	ESP	Oriol Busquets
16	GK	BRA	Thiago

No.	Pos.	Nation	Player
17	MF	GHA	Yaw Moses
18	FW	USA	Benji Michel
19	FW	ESP	Rafa Mújica
20	MF	POR	Pedro Moreira
22	DF	UKR	Bohdan Milovanov
23	FW	ESP	Cristo González
26	DF	BRA	Weverson
28	DF	POR	Tiago Esgaio (on loan from Braga)
43	MF	BRA	Vitinho
44	DF	CRO	Nino Galović
64	DF	POR	Rafael Fernandes
89	MF	POR	Pedro Santos

== Transfers ==
=== In ===
Pos.	Player	Transferred from	Fee	Date	Source
FW	(Spain) Cristo González	(Italy) Udinese	Undisclosed	1 July 2023	
MF	(Spain) Jason	(Spain) Alavés	Undisclosed	4 July 2023	
MF	(Ivory Coast) Eboue Kouassi	(Belgium) Genk	Undisclosed	7 July 2023	
FW	(Spain) Miguel Puche	(Spain) Real Zaragoza	Free	6 August 2023	
DF	(Uruguay) Matías Rocha	(Uruguay) Defensor Sporting	€220,000	11 August 2023	
FW	(Uruguay) Alfonso Trezza	(Uruguay) Nacional	€183,000	16 August 2023	
DF	(Spain) Javi Montero	(Turkey) Beşiktaş	Loan	28 August 2023	

=== Out ===
Pos.	Player	Transferred to	Fee	Date	Source
FW	(Palestine) Oday Dabbagh	(Belgium) Charleroi	Free	1 July 2023	
MF	(Argentina) Alan Ruiz	(Brazil) Sport Recife	Free	6 July 2023	
DF	(Brazil) Luiz Gustavo	(Portugal) Sanjoanense	Undisclosed	26 July 2023	
DF	(Brazil) João Basso	(Brazil) Santos	€2,500,000	31 July 2023	
MF	(Brazil) Antony	(United States) Portland Timbers	Undisclosed	2 August 2023	
FW	(Democratic Republic of the Congo) André Bukia	(Tunisia) Espérance de Tunis	Undisclosed	31 January 2024	

== Pre-season and friendlies ==
Win Draw Loss Fixtures

18 July 2023 Friendly	Arouca (Portugal)	3–0	(Portugal) Boavista	Luso
19:00 UTC+1	Mújica 34'; Cristo 61'; Galović 79'			Stadium: Centro de Estágios de Luso

21 July 2023 Friendly	Arouca (Portugal)	0–0	(Portugal) Braga B	Luso
10:00 UTC+1				Stadium: Centro de Estágios de Luso

21 July 2023 Friendly	Arouca (Portugal)	2–1	(Portugal) Trofense	Luso
18:00 UTC+1	Antony 19'; Cristo 50'		Caetano 56'	Stadium: Centro de Estágios de Luso

22 July 2023 Friendly	Arouca (Portugal)	2–1	(Portugal) Anadia	Luso
19:00 UTC+1				Stadium: Centro de Estágios de Luso

3 August 2023 Friendly	Arouca (Portugal)	0–0	(Portugal) Moreirense	Moreira de Cónegos
12:30 UTC+1				Stadium: Parque de Jogos Comendador Joaquim de Almeida Freitas

== Competitions ==
=== Overall record ===
Competition	First match	Last match	Starting round	Final position	Record							
Competition	First match	Last match	Starting round	Final position	Pld	W	D	L	GF	GA	GD	Win %
Primeira Liga	13 August 2023	19 May 2024	Matchday 1		21	8	4	9	35	29	+6	38.10
Taça de Portugal	21 October 2023	10 January 2024	Third round	Fifth round	3	1	1	1	5	4	+1	33.33
Taça da Liga	30 July 2023	31 October 2023	Second round	Third round	3	2	0	1	4	3	+1	66.67
UEFA Europa Conference League	10 August 2023	17 August 2023	Third qualifying round	Third qualifying round	2	1	0	1	3	4	−1	50.00
Total					29	12	5	12	47	40	+7	41.38

Last updated: 12 February 2024
Source: Soccerway

=== Primeira Liga ===
==== League table ====
Pos	Team	Pld	W	D	L	GF	GA	GD	Pts	Qualification or relegation
5	Vitória de Guimarães	34	19	6	9	52	38	+14	63	Qualification for the Conference League second qualifying round (Note: Since the 2023–24 Taça de Portugal winners, Porto, finished in top three, the spot given to the third-placed team (Europa League second qualifying round) was passed to the fourth-placed team, and the spot given to the fourth-placed team (Conference League second qualifying round) was passed to the fifth-placed team.)
6	Moreirense	34	16	7	11	36	35	+1	55	
7	Arouca	34	13	7	14	54	50	+4	46	
8	Famalicão	34	10	12	12	37	41	−4	42	
9	Casa Pia	34	10	8	16	38	50	−12	38	

Source: Liga Portugal
Rules for classification: 1) Points; 2) Head-to-head points; 3) Head-to-head goal difference; 4) Head-to-head away goals scored; 5) Goal difference; 6) Matches won; 7) Goals scored; 8) Play-off.

==== Results summary ====
Overall								Home						Away					
Pld	W	D	L	GF	GA	GD	Pts	W	D	L	GF	GA	GD	W	D	L	GF	GA	GD
34	13	7	14	54	50	+4	46	7	3	7	26	26	0	6	4	7	28	24	+4

Last updated: 18 May 2024.
Source: Liga Portugal

==== Results by round ====
Round	1	2	3	4	5	6	7	8	9	10	11	12	13	14	15	16	17	18	19	20	21	22	23	24	25	26	27	28	29	30	31	32	33	34
Ground	H	A	H	A	H	A	H	A	H	A	H	A	H	H	A	H	A	A	H	A	H	A	H	A	H	A	H	A	H	A	A	H	A	H
Result	W	D	D	D	L	L	L	L	L	L	L	W	D	W	W	L	L	W	W	W	W	L	W	W	L	L	W	W	W	D	D	D	L	L
Position	4	5	7	8	11	12	13	16	15	18	18	18	16	14	10	13	14	10	8	7	7	7	7	7	7	7	7	7	6	6	7	7	7	7

Updated to match(es) played on 18 May 2024. Source: Liga Portugal
A = Away; H = Home; W = Win; D = Draw; L = Loss

==== Matches ====
The league fixtures were unveiled on 5 July 2023.

13 August 2023 1	Arouca	4–3	Estoril	Arouca
20:30 UTC+1	Esgaio (yellow card) 4'; Sylla (yellow card) 10'; Mújica 20'; Kouassi (yellow card) 21' (yellow-red card) 37'; Cristo 57'; Feltes 73' (o.g.); Santos 90+6', (yellow card) 90+7'	Report	Holsgrove 10', (yellow card) 41'; J. Marques 49'; A. Marqués 70'; Gomes (yellow card) 90+10'	Stadium: Estádio Municipal; Referee: Hélder Carvalho

20 August 2023 2	Vizela	2–2	Arouca	Vizela
20:30 UTC+1	Samu 9' (pen.), (yellow card) 89'; Moreira (yellow card) 37'; Anderson (yellow card) 45'; Pereira (yellow card) 45+6'; Silva (red card) 57'; Essende 88'; Nascimento (yellow card) 90+6'; Ortiz (yellow card) 90+6'	Report	Rocha (red card) 8'; Cristo 39', (yellow card) 45+6'; Esgaio (yellow card) 42'; Sylla (yellow card) 45+2'; Santos (yellow card) 45+8'; Mújica 64'; Quaresma (yellow card) 74'; Busquets (yellow card) 84'	Stadium: Estádio do FC Vizela; Referee: Hélder Malheiro

26 August 2023 3	Arouca	1–1	Portimonense	Arouca
15:30 WEST	David Simão (yellow card) 59'; Sylla 84'	Report	Hélio Varela 5'; Igor Formiga (yellow card) 25'; Dener (yellow card) 64'	Stadium: Estádio Municipal; Attendance: 2,252; Referee: (Portugal) Carlos Macedo

3 September 2023 4	Porto	1–1	Arouca	Porto
18:00 WEST	Fábio Cardoso (yellow card) 26'; Evanilson (yellow card) 57' (goal) 90+19'; Varela (yellow card) 58'	Report	de Arruabarrena (yellow card) 63'; Cristo González 84'; Javi Montero (yellow card) 85'	Stadium: Estádio do Dragão; Attendance: 46,516; Referee: (Portugal) Miguel Nogueira

17 September 2023 5	Arouca	0–1	Casa Pia	Arouca
15:30 WEST	Cristo González (yellow card) 44'; Javi Montero (yellow card) 82'	Report	Vasco Fernandes (yellow card) 11'; Beni Mukendi (yellow card) 83'; Felippe Cardoso 90+1' (yellow card) 90+3'	Stadium: Estádio Municipal; Attendance: 1,346; Referee: (Portugal) André Narciso

22 September 2023 6	Famalicão	1–0	Arouca	Vila Nova de Famalicão
20:15 WEST	Otávio (yellow card) 16' (goal) 28'; Riccieli (yellow card) 39' (yellow-red card) 57'; Óscar Aranda (yellow card) 45+1'; Martín Aguirregabiria (yellow card) 51'	Report	Jason (yellow card) 20'; Galović (yellow card) 64'; Rafa Mújica (red card) 77'	Stadium: Estádio Municipal 22 de Junho; Attendance: 3,678; Referee: (Portugal) Bruno Vieira

1 October 2023 7	Arouca	0–2	Chaves	Arouca
15:30 WEST	Sylla (yellow card) 1'; Weverson (yellow card) 45+2'; David Simão {{sent off (yellow card) 45+1'|0|45+3}}; Trezza (yellow card) 53'	Report	João Correia (yellow card) 35' (goal) 85'; Hugo Souza (yellow card) 45+1'; Héctor Hernández 53' (pen.) (yellow card) 53'; Guima (yellow card) 64'; Ygor Nogueira (yellow card) 73'	Stadium: Estádio Municipal; Attendance: 1,765; Referee: (Portugal) Fábio Melo

8 October 2023 8	Sporting CP	2–1	Arouca	Lisbon
20:30 WEST	Diomande (yellow card) 29' (yellow-red card) 42'; Gyökeres 31'; Edwards (yellow card) 45+2'; Eduardo Quaresma (yellow card) 62'; Morita 68'	Report	Rafa Mújica (yellow card) 29' (goal) 52'; Cristo González (yellow card) 58'; Weverson (yellow card) 60'; Rafael Fernandes (yellow card) 64' (yellow-red card) 87'; de Arruabarrena (yellow card) 74'; Pedro Santos (yellow card) 90+3'	Stadium: Estádio José Alvalade; Attendance: 36,688; Referee: (Portugal) António Nobre

27 October 2023 9	Arouca	0–1	Moreirense	Arouca
20:15 WEST	Trezza (yellow card) 37'; Kouassi (yellow card) 46'	Report	Marcelo 39'; Antonisse (yellow card) 76' (yellow-red card) 89'	Stadium: Estádio Municipal; Attendance: 1,037; Referee: (Portugal) Bruno Pires Costa

6 November 2023 10	Farense	2–0	Arouca	Faro
20:15 WEST	Claudio Falcão (yellow card) 25'; Mattheus Oliveira 31' (pen.); Bruno Duarte 38' (pen.)	Report	David Simão (yellow card) 71'	Stadium: Estádio de São Luís; Attendance: 4,237; Referee: (Portugal) Iancu Vasilica

12 November 2023 11	Arouca	0–1	Braga	Arouca
18:00 WET	David Simão (yellow card) 40'; Pedro Santos (yellow card) 88'	Report	Álvaro Djaló 36'; João Moutinho (yellow card) 45+3'; Bruma (yellow card) 46'; Matheus (yellow card) 85'; Abel Ruiz (yellow card) 90+3'	Stadium: Estádio Municipal; Attendance: 1,525; Referee: (Portugal) João Ferreira

3 December 2023 12	Boavista	0–4	Arouca	Porto
20:30 WET	Onyemaechi (yellow card) 1'; Pérez (yellow card) 45+1'; Tiago Morais (yellow card) 67' (yellow-red card) 90+4'; Berna (yellow card) 81'; Filipe Ferreira (yellow card) 82'	Report	Cristo González 2' 23'; Rafa Mújica 39'; Milovanov (yellow card) 42' (yellow-red card) 49'; Sylla (yellow card) 55'; Trezza (yellow card) 70'; Jason 72'	Stadium: Estádio do Bessa; Attendance: 3,788; Referee: (Portugal) Tiago Martins

10 December 2023 13	Arouca	2–2	Rio Ave	Arouca
18:00 WET	Sylla (yellow card) 1'; Cristo González 50'; Jason 62'	Report	Aderllan Santos 5' (yellow card) 69'; Oudrhiri (yellow card) 26'; Boateng 29'; Jhonatan (yellow card) 59'; João Graça (yellow card) 85'; Fábio Ronaldo (yellow card) 88'	Stadium: Estádio Municipal; Attendance: 1,122; Referee: (Portugal) André Narciso

16 December 2023 14	Arouca	3–0	Gil Vicente	Arouca
18:00 WET	Rafa Mújica (yellow card) 38' (goal) 45+1' 61' 78'; Tiago Esgaio (yellow card) 85'	Report		Stadium: Estádio Municipal; Attendance: 1,386; Referee: (Portugal) Manuel Oliveira

28 December 2023 15	Estrela	1–4	Arouca	Amadora
20:15 WET	Kialonda Gaspar 11'; Dida (red card) 71'	Report	Rafa Mújica (yellow card) 40' (goal) 47'; Sylla (yellow card) 66'; Jason 77'; Javi Montero 80'; Bukia 90+1'; de Arruabarrena (yellow card) 90+7'	Stadium: Estádio José Gomes; Attendance: 4,352; Referee: (Portugal) João Pinheiro

6 January 2024 16	Arouca	0–3	Benfica	Arouca
18:00 WET	Javi Montero (yellow card) 14'; Kouassi (yellow card) 76'	Report	Rafa Silva 39'; Kökçü 47'; Arthur Cabral (yellow card) 72'; Florentino Luís (yellow card) 79'; Musa 85'	Stadium: Estádio Municipal; Attendance: 4,437; Referee: (Portugal) Fábio Veríssimo

15 January 2024 17	Vitória de Guimarães	2–1	Arouca	Guimarães
20:15 WET	Jota Silva 45'; André Silva 64'	Report	Jason 8' (yellow card) 40'; Javi Montero (yellow card) 31'; Trezza (yellow card) 90+3'	Stadium: Estádio D. Afonso Henriques; Attendance: 11,206; Referee: (Portugal) Gustavo Correia

20 January 2024 18	Estoril	1–2	Arouca	Estoril
15:30	Guitane 3'		Mújica 8'; Esgaio 45+1'	Stadium: Estádio António Coimbra da Mota; Referee: (Portugal) João Ferreira

28 January 2024 19	Arouca	5–0	Vizela	Arouca
20:30	Mújica 11', 86'; Cristo 17' (pen.), 90+2'; Pereira 50' (o.g.)			Stadium: Estádio Municipal; Referee: (Portugal) Luís Godinho

3 February 2024 20	Portimonense	1–2	Arouca	Portimão
15:30	Carrillo 71'		Mújica 48'; Rocha 52'	Stadium: Estádio Municipal de Portimão; Referee: (Portugal) David Silva

12 February 2024 21	Arouca	3–2	Porto	Arouca
20:15	Mújica 1'; Cristo 30' (pen.); Jason 60'		Evanilson 9' (pen.); Cardoso (yellow card) 69' (yellow-red card) 90+6'; Conceição 86'	Stadium: Estádio Municipal; Referee: (Portugal) Nuno Miguel Serrano Almeida

18 February 2024 22	Casa Pia	1–0	Arouca	Rio Maior
15:30	Clayton 74'	Report	Javi Montero (yellow card) 64'; David Simão (yellow card) 71'	Stadium: Estádio Municipal de Rio Maior; Attendance: 1,244; Referee: (Portugal) José Bessa

23 February 2024 23	Arouca	3–2	Famalicão	Arouca
20:15 WET	Sylla 33'; Jason (yellow card) 45'; Cristo González 45+1'; Rafa Mújica (yellow card) 54' (goal) 64'	Report	Cádiz 12' (yellow card) 86'; Youssouf (yellow card) 38'; Sorriso (yellow card) 44'; Gustavo Sá 56'; Mihaj (yellow card) 61'; Riccieli (yellow card) 75'; Rodríguez (red card) 90+4'; Óscar Aranda (yellow card) 90+9'	Stadium: Estádio Municipal; Attendance: 1,361; Referee: (Portugal) Luís Godinho

1 March 2024 24	Chaves	1–5	Arouca	Chaves
20:15 WET	Raphael Guzzo 16'; Pius (yellow card) 38'	Report	Cristo González 35' (yellow card) 44'; Rafa Mújica 40' 49'; Sylla (yellow card) 42' (goal) 53'; Jason 47'	Stadium: Estádio Municipal Eng. Manuel Branco Teixeira; Attendance: 1,927; Referee: (Portugal) Iancu Vasilica

10 March 2024 25	Arouca	0–3	Sporting CP	Arouca
18:00 WET	David Simão (yellow card) 80'; Galović (yellow card) 84'	Report	Gyökeres 19'; Geny Catamo 90+1'; Hjulmand 90+6'	Stadium: Estádio Municipal; Attendance: 4,061; Referee: (Portugal) Nuno Almeida

17 March 2024 26	Moreirense	1–0	Arouca	Moreira de Cónegos
15:30 WET	Hernâni Infande 10'; Ofori (yellow card) 26'	Report	Kouassi (yellow card) 19'	Stadium: Parque de Jogos Comendador Joaquim de Almeida Freitas; Attendance: 4,005; Referee: (Portugal) Artur Soares Dias

30 March 2024 27	Arouca	2–1	Farense	Arouca
15:30 WET	Tiago Esgaio 45+1'; de Arruabarrena (yellow card) 55'; Cristo González 68'; Trezza (yellow card) 78'; Pedro Moreira (yellow card) 90+1'	Report	Cáseres (yellow card) 49' (yellow-red card) 90+5'; Bruno Duarte (yellow card) 82' (goal) 88'	Stadium: Estádio Municipal; Attendance: 1,127; Referee: (Portugal) Luís Godinho

6 April 2024 28	Braga	0–3	Arouca	Braga
18:00 WET	João Moutinho (yellow card) 45+4'	Report	Javi Montero (yellow card) 9'; Saatçı 29' (o.g.); Rafa Mújica 34' 89'; David Simão (yellow card) 46'; Pedro Santos (yellow card) 62'	Stadium: Estádio Municipal de Braga; Attendance: 13,031; Referee: (Portugal) João Ferreira

14 April 2024 29	Arouca	2–1	Boavista	Arouca
18:00 WET	Rafa Mújica 30'; David Simão (yellow card) 34'; Weverson 39' (yellow card) 52'; Javi Montero (yellow card) 82'	Report	Pérez (yellow card) 34' (yellow-red card) 43'; Boženík 47'; Salvador Agra (yellow card) 79'; Abascal (yellow card) 90'	Stadium: Estádio Municipal; Attendance: 2,301; Referee: (Portugal) Carlos Macedo

19 April 2024 30	Rio Ave	1–1	Arouca	Vila do Conde
20:15 WET	Joca 36'; Miguel Nóbrega (yellow card) 45'; Tanlongo (yellow card) 70'; Zé Manuel (yellow card) 90+1'	Report	Sylla (yellow card) 42'; Rafa Mújica 47'; Weverson (yellow card) 78'; Robson Bambu (yellow card) 90+5'	Stadium: Estádio dos Arcos; Attendance: 3,225; Referee: (Portugal) Bruno Vieira

26 April 2024 31	Gil Vicente	2–2	Arouca	Barcelos
20:15 WET	Dominguez (yellow card) 34'; Martim Neto (yellow card) 63'; Touré 90+4'; Jonathan Buatu 90+5' (yellow card) 90+6'	Report	Milovanov (yellow card) 35'; Cristo González 47' 82'	Stadium: Estádio Cidade de Barcelos; Attendance: 3,401; Referee: (Portugal) Gustavo Correia

5 May 2024 32	Arouca	0–0	Estrela	Arouca
18:00 WET	Rocha (yellow card) 90'	Report	Nilton Varela (yellow card) 40'; Rodrigo Pinho (yellow card) 44'; Léo Cordeiro (yellow card) 90+3'; Bucca (yellow card) 90+6'	Stadium: Estádio Municipal; Attendance: 1,079; Referee: (Portugal) Miguel Nogueira

12 May 2024 33	Benfica	5–0	Arouca	Lisbon
18:00 WET	Di María 25' (pen.) (yellow card) 59'; Kökçü 32' (pen.); Florentino Luís (yellow card) 36'; Rafa Silva 42' 46'; Tengstedt 77'	Report	Javi Montero (yellow card) 28'; David Simão (yellow card) 59'	Stadium: Estádio da Luz; Attendance: 49,364; Referee: (Portugal) Fábio Melo

18 May 2024 34	Arouca	1–3	Vitória de Guimarães	Arouca
15:30 WET	Cristo González 39' (pen.); Kouassi (yellow card) 45+2'; David Simão (yellow card) 64'; Lawal (yellow card) 82'	Report	Jota Silva (yellow card) 33'; Tiago Silva (yellow card) 45+3'; Nélson Oliveira 50'; Thiago 53' (o.g.); Manu Silva 62'; André André (yellow card) 72'; Bruno Varela (yellow card) 82'; Tomás Ribeiro (yellow card) 90+2'	Stadium: Estádio Municipal; Attendance: 2,208; Referee: (Portugal) Bruno Pires Costa

=== Taça de Portugal ===
21 October 2023 Third round	Felgueiras	1–3	Arouca	Felgueiras
19:00 WEST	Léo Cá 66'; Afonso Silva (yellow card) 90+5'	Report	Trezza (yellow card) 3' (goal) 48'; Javi Montero (yellow card) 11'; Weverson (yellow card) 89'; Kouassi 90+2'; Rafa Mújica 90+7' (pen.)	Stadium: Estádio Dr. Machado de Matos; Referee: (Portugal) Artur Soares Dias

26 November 2023 Fourth round	Arouca	2–2 (a.e.t.) (4–3 p)	Boavista	Arouca
20:00 WET	Kouassi (yellow card) 38'; Cristo González 39'; Milovanov (yellow card) 58'; Trezza (yellow card) 95'; Pedro Santos 105+5' (pen.) (yellow card) 110'	Report	Onyemaechi (yellow card) 18'; Tiago Morais (yellow card) 37'; Awaziem (yellow card) 46'; Lourenço (yellow card) 49' (goal) 106'; Boženík 62' (yellow card) 78'; Berna (yellow card) 105+2'; Vukotić (yellow card) 120'	Stadium: Estádio Municipal de Arouca; Referee: (Portugal) Fábio Melo

10 January 2024 Fifth round	Vizela	1–0	Arouca	Vizela
20:00 WET	Matheus Pereira (yellow card) 13'; Lacava (yellow card) 35'; Galović 76' (o.g.)	Report	Galović (yellow card) 4'	Stadium: Estádio do Futebol Clube de Vizela; Referee: (Portugal) José Bessa

=== Taça da Liga ===
30 July 2023 Second round	Arouca	2–0	Rio Ave	Arouca
21:30 UTC+1	Kouassi 24'; Fernandes (yellow card) 31'; Mújica 67'; Jason (yellow card) 72'; Galović (yellow card) 75'; Quaresma (yellow card) 84'	Report	Costinha (yellow card) 22'	Stadium: Estádio Municipal; Referee: Flávio Duarte

=== Group B ===
Pos	Team	Pld	W	D	L	GF	GA	GD	Pts	Qualification	BEN	ARO	AVS
1	Benfica	2	2	0	0	6	1	+5	6	Advance to knockout phase	—	—	4–1
2	Arouca	2	1	0	1	2	3	−1	3		0–2	—	—
3	AVS	2	0	0	2	2	6	−4	0		—	1–2	—

Source: Liga Portugal
Rules for classification: Tiebreakers

26 September 2023 Third round	AVS	1–2	Arouca	Aves
20:15 WEST	Balla Sangaré (yellow card) 23'; Carlos Daniel 59'; Léo Alaba (red card) 90+5'; Idrissa Dioh (yellow card) 90+6'	Report	Jason 17'; Cristo González 67'; David Simão (yellow card) 90+9'	Stadium: Estádio do CD Aves; Attendance: 602; Referee: (Portugal) Tiago Martins

31 October 2023 Third round	Arouca	0–2	Benfica	Arouca
20:15 WEST	Javi Montero (yellow card) 25'; Rafael Fernandes (yellow card) 39'; Kouassi (yellow card) 57'	Report	Di María 26'; António Silva (yellow card) 35'; Gonçalo Guedes (yellow card) 45'; Arthur Cabral 74'	Stadium: Estádio Municipal de Arouca; Attendance: 3,405; Referee: (Portugal) Hélder Carvalho

=== UEFA Europa Conference League ===
==== Third qualifying round ====
The draw for the third qualifying round was held on 24 July 2023.

10 August 2023 First leg	Arouca (Portugal)	2–1	(Norway) Brann	Arouca
19:00 UTC+1	Mújica 23'; Galović (yellow card) 64'; Cristo 74'; Busquets (yellow card) 85'	Report	Warming (yellow card) 71', (goal) 79'; Pedersen (yellow card) 81'	Stadium: Estádio Municipal; Attendance: 2,388; Referee: David Munro (Scotland)

17 August 2023 Second leg	Brann (Norway)	3–1 (4–3 agg.)	(Portugal) Arouca	Bergen, Norway
19:00 UTC+2	Myhre 6'; Pedersen (yellow card) 38'; Knudsen 42', (yellow card) 64'; Finne 45'; Crone (yellow card) 50'	Report	Galović (yellow card) 27' (yellow-red card) 90+3'; Sylla 57'; Simão (yellow card) 57'; Santos (yellow card) 90+3'; De Arruabarrena (yellow card) 90+3'	Stadium: Brann Stadion; Attendance: 14,119; Referee: Bram Van Driessche (Belgium)
