= 2022–23 F.C. Arouca season =

F.C. Arouca
2022–23 season
- Chairman: Carlos Pinho
- Manager: Armando Evangelista
- Stadium: Estádio Municipal de Arouca
- Primeira Liga: 5th
- Taça de Portugal: Fifth round
- Taça da Liga: Semi-finals
- Top goalscorer: League: Rafa Mújica (8); All: Rafa Mújica (14)

The 2022–23 season was the 71st in the history of F.C. Arouca and their second consecutive season in the top flight. The club participated in the Primeira Liga, the Taça de Portugal, and the Taça da Liga.

== Players ==
=== First-team squad ===
As of 17 January 2023

Note: Flags indicate national team as defined under FIFA eligibility rules; some limited exceptions apply. Players may hold more than one non-FIFA nationality.

No.	Pos.	Nation	Player
2	MF	GUI	Morlaye Sylla
3	DF	ENG	Jerome Opoku
4	DF	VEN	José Manuel Velázquez
5	MF	POR	David Simão
6	DF	BRA	Mateus Quaresma
8	FW	POR	Arsénio
9	FW	BRA	Bruno Marques (on loan from Santos)
10	FW	ARG	Alan Ruiz
11	MF	BRA	Antony
12	GK	URU	Ignacio de Arruabarrena
13	DF	BRA	João Basso
14	MF	ESP	Oriol Busquets
15	FW	PLE	Oday Dabbagh

No.	Pos.	Nation	Player
16	GK	BRA	Thiago
17	MF	GHA	Yaw Moses
19	FW	ESP	Rafa Mújica
20	MF	POR	Pedro Moreira
21	DF	UKR	Bohdan Milovanov
23	MF	CIV	Ismaila Soro (on loan from Celtic)
25	DF	BRA	Weverson
28	MF	POR	Tiago Esgaio (on loan from Braga)
43	MF	BRA	Vitinho
44	DF	CRO	Nino Galović
64	DF	POR	Rafael Fernandes
92	GK	POR	João Valido
—	FW	USA	Benji Michel

=== Out on loan ===
Note: Flags indicate national team as defined under FIFA eligibility rules; some limited exceptions apply. Players may hold more than one non-FIFA nationality.

No.	Pos.	Nation	Player
—	FW	COD	André Bukia (at Al-Batin until 30 June 2023)
—	DF	BRA	Luiz Gustavo (at Gondomar until 30 June 2023)

== Pre-season and friendlies ==
Win Draw Loss

12 July 2022 Friendly	Arouca (Portugal)	2–3	(Portugal) Braga	Apúlia e Fão
18:00 WEST (UTC+1)	Bukia 54'; Bruno Marques 90'		González 79', 83'; Vitinha 90+3'	Stadium: Centro Desportivo de Fão

16 July 2022 Friendly	Boavista (Portugal)	0–2	(Portugal) Arouca	Porto
10:00 WEST (UTC+1)			Antony 45'; Bruno Marques 54'	Stadium: Estádio do Bessa

23 July 2022 Friendly	Arouca (Portugal)	0–0	(Portugal) Chaves	Vila Meã
10:30 WEST (UTC+1)				Stadium: Estádio Municipal de Vila Meã

27 July 2022 Friendly	Arouca (Portugal)	2–1	(France) Paris 13 Atletico	TBD
17:00 WEST (UTC+1)	Antony 57'; Arsénio 67'		Etonde 23'

23 September 2022 Friendly	Sanjoanense (Portugal)	0–0	(Portugal) Arouca	São João da Madeira
--:-- WEST (UTC+1)		Report		Stadium: Estádio Conde Dias Garcia

== Competitions ==
=== Overall record ===
Competition	First match	Last match	Starting round	Final position	Record							
Competition	First match	Last match	Starting round	Final position	Pld	W	D	L	GF	GA	GD	Win %
Primeira Liga	5 August 2022	27 May 2023	Matchday 1	5th	34	15	9	10	36	37	−1	44.12
Taça de Portugal	15 October 2022	11 January 2023	Third round	Fifth round	3	2	0	1	6	5	+1	66.67
Taça da Liga	18 November 2022	24 January 2023	Group stage	Semi-finals	6	3	2	1	10	6	+4	50.00
Total					43	20	11	12	52	48	+4	46.51

Source: Soccerway

=== Primeira Liga ===
==== League table ====
Pos	Team	Pld	W	D	L	GF	GA	GD	Pts	Qualification or relegation
3	Braga	34	25	3	6	75	30	+45	78	Qualification for the Champions League third qualifying round
4	Sporting CP	34	23	5	6	71	32	+39	74	Qualification for the Europa League group stage
5	Arouca	34	15	9	10	36	37	−1	54	Qualification for the Europa Conference League third qualifying round
6	Vitória de Guimarães	34	16	5	13	34	39	−5	53	Qualification for the Europa Conference League second qualifying round
7	Chaves	34	12	10	12	35	40	−5	46	

Source: Liga Portugal
Rules for classification: 1) Points; 2) Head-to-head points; 3) Head-to-head goal difference; 4) Goal difference; 5) Matches won; 6) Goals scored; 7) Play-off.

==== Results summary ====
Overall								Home						Away					
Pld	W	D	L	GF	GA	GD	Pts	W	D	L	GF	GA	GD	W	D	L	GF	GA	GD
34	15	9	10	36	37	−1	54	10	2	5	22	17	+5	5	7	5	14	20	−6

Last updated: 27 May 2023.
Source: Liga Portugal

==== Results by round ====
Round	1	2	3	4	5	6	7	8	9	10	11	12	13	14	15	16	17	18	19	20	21	22	23	24	25	26	27	28	29	30	31	32	33	34
Ground	A	H	A	H	A	H	H	A	H	A	H	A	H	A	H	A	H	H	A	H	A	H	A	A	H	A	H	A	H	A	H	A	H	A
Result	L	W	W	L	D	L	D	D	W	D	W	W	L	L	W	D	W	L	D	W	L	W	D	W	D	W	W	D	W	L	L	L	W	W
Position	18	7	7	10	10	12	11	12	10	11	9	8	8	9	7	7	6	7	7	7	7	6	7	6	7	5	5	5	5	5	5	5	5	5

Updated to match(es) played on 27 May 2023. Source: Liga Portugal
A = Away; H = Home; W = Win; D = Draw; L = Loss

==== Matches ====
The league fixtures were announced on 5 July 2022.

5 August 2022 1	Benfica	4–0	Arouca	Lisbon
20:15 WEST (UTC+1)	Gilberto 8'; R. Silva 41', 86' (yellow card) 83'; Fernández 45+5'; Florentino (yellow card) 54'; Weigl (yellow card) 82'	Report	Opoku (yellow card) 1'; Quaresma (red card) 44'	Stadium: Estádio da Luz; Attendance: 53,617; Referee: Manuel Mota

15 August 2022 2	Arouca	1–0	Gil Vicente	Arouca
18:00 WEST (UTC+1)	Mújica 1'	Report		Stadium: Estádio Municipal de Arouca; Attendance: 1,759; Referee: Nuno Almeida

20 August 2022 3	Santa Clara	1–2	Arouca	Ponta Delgada
15:30 CEST (UTC+2)	Ricardinho (yellow card) 29'; Rildo 50'; Marcos (yellow card) 83'	Report	Milovanov (yellow card) 40'; Soro (yellow card) 42'; Rildo 34', (yellow card) 57'; Mújica 61'; Esgaio (yellow card) 71'; João Basso 76' (pen.)	Stadium: Estádio de São Miguel; Attendance: 1,172; Referee: Hélder Carvalho

28 August 2022 4	Arouca	0–6	Braga	Arouca
18:00 WEST (UTC+1)		Report	Banza 1'; Horta 4' 40'; Vitinha 44'; Castro 67'; Lainez 77'	Stadium: Estádio Municipal de Arouca; Attendance: 2,348; Referee: Gustavo Correia

4 September 2022 5	Casa Pia	0–0	Arouca	Oeiras
15:30 WEST (UTC+1)	Romário Baró (yellow card) 64'; Vasco Fernandes (yellow card) 90+1'	Report		Stadium: Estádio Nacional; Attendance: 1,022; Referee: Carlos Macedo

11 September 2022 6	Arouca	1–2	Boavista	Arouca
18:00 WEST (UTC+1)	Mújica 27'	Report	Sasso 31'; Tavares 70'	Stadium: Estádio Municipal de Arouca; Attendance: 1,395; Referee: João Gonçalves

18 September 2022 7	Arouca	2–2	Vitória de Guimarães	Arouca
15:30 WEST (UTC+1)	Bukia 33'; Quaresma 71'	Report	Anderson 57'; Lameiras 90+12' (pen.)	Stadium: Estádio Municipal de Arouca; Attendance: 2,376; Referee: Fábio Veríssimo

2 October 2022 8	Paços de Ferreira	1–1	Arouca	Paços de Ferreira
18:00 WEST (UTC+1)	Gaitán 60'	Report	Dabbagh 84'	Stadium: Estádio da Mata Real; Attendance: 4,431; Referee: Hélder Malheiro

10 October 2022 9	Arouca	4–1	Famalicão	Arouca
20:15 WEST (UTC+1)	Bukia 30'; Sylla 52'; Antony 58'; Dabbagh 83'	Report	Colombatto 21'; Puma (yellow card) 34'; Millán (yellow card) 61'; Fonte (yellow card) 69'; Gustavo Assunção (yellow card) 77'	Stadium: Estádio Municipal de Arouca; Attendance: 1 018; Referee: André Narciso

23 October 2022 10	Marítimo	1–1	Arouca	Funchal
15:30 WEST (UTC+1)	Vidigal 12'	Report	Antony 44'	Stadium: Estádio do Marítimo; Attendance: 9,072; Referee: Manuel Oliveira

29 October 2022 11	Arouca	1–0	Sporting CP	Arouca
20:30 WEST (UTC+1)	Basso 47'	Report		Stadium: Estádio Municipal de Arouca; Attendance: 2,364; Referee: Rui Costa

5 November 2022 12	Vizela	0–1	Arouca	Vizela
15:30 WET (UTC±0)		Report	Antony 3'	Stadium: Estádio do FC Vizela; Referee: Miguel Nogueira

12 November 2022 13	Arouca	0–1	Rio Ave	Arouca
18:00 WET (UTC±0)		Report	Yakubu 59' (pen.)	Stadium: Estádio Municipal de Arouca; Referee: João Pinheiro

28 December 2022 14	Porto	5–1	Arouca	Porto
20:15 WET (UTC±0)	Otávio 1'; Taremi 18', 34', 50'; Marcano (yellow card) 59'; Opoku 70' (o.g.)	Report	Ruiz (yellow card) 36'; Sylla (yellow card) 48'; Marques 75'; Basso (yellow card) 85'	Stadium: Estádio do Dragão; Attendance: 45,725; Referee: Tiago Martins

7 January 2023 15	Arouca	2–0	Estoril	Arouca
15:30 WET (UTC±0)	Dabbagh 28', 64'	Report		Stadium: Estádio Municipal de Arouca; Attendance: 764; Referee: João Pinheiro

15 January 2023 16	Chaves	1–1	Arouca	Chaves
15:30 WET (UTC±0)	Vitória 17' (pen.)	Report	Basso 78' (pen.); Opoku (red card) 90+1'	Stadium: Estádio Municipal Eng. Manuel Branco Teixeira; Attendance: 1,768; Referee: Nuno Almeida

20 January 2023 17	Arouca	4–0	Portimonense	Arouca
19:00 WET (UTC±0)	Dabbagh 6', 76'; Ruiz 31'; Michel 78'	Report		Stadium: Estádio Municipal de Arouca; Attendance: 839; Referee: André Narciso

31 January 2023 18	Arouca	0–3	Benfica	Arouca
21:15 WET (UTC±0)		Report	João Mário 23', 54'; Musa 81'	Stadium: Estádio Municipal de Arouca; Attendance: 4,614; Referee: Rui Costa

5 February 2023 19	Gil Vicente	1–1	Arouca	Barcelos
20:30 WET (UTC±0)	Vitor Carvalho 37' (yellow card) 77'; Ali Alipour (yellow card) 57'	Report	Milovanov (yellow card) 27'; Oday Dabbagh 30'; João Basso (yellow card) 90+2'; Arsénio (yellow card) 90+6'	Stadium: Estádio Cidade de Barcelos; Attendance: 2,725; Referee: (Portugal) Artur Soares Dias

11 February 2023 20	Arouca	1–0	Santa Clara	Arouca
18:00 WET (UTC±0)	Soro (yellow card) 40'; Ruiz 49'; de Arruabarrena (yellow card) 86'	Report	Victor Bobsin (yellow card) 9'; Costinha (yellow card) 30'; Misao (yellow card) 87'; Xavi Quintillà (yellow card) 90+5'	Stadium: Estádio Municipal de Arouca; Attendance: 857; Referee: (Portugal) Hélder Carvalho

19 February 2023 21	Braga	2–0	Arouca	Braga
18:00 WET (UTC±0)	Abel Ruiz 1'; Račić (yellow card) 37'; Banza 81'	Report	João Basso (yellow card) 45'; Pedro Moreira (yellow card) 66'; Galović (yellow card) 74'; David Simão (yellow card) 74'	Stadium: Estádio Municipal de Braga; Attendance: 13,407; Referee: (Portugal) Fábio Veríssimo

25 February 2023 22	Arouca	2–0	Casa Pia	Arouca
15:30 WET (UTC±0)	Quaresma (yellow card) 76'; Rafa Mújica 81' 90+3' (yellow card) 90+4'	Report	Neto (yellow card) 36'; Beni Mukendi (yellow card) 71' (yellow-red card) 75'; Leonardo Lelo (yellow card) 90'	Stadium: Estádio Municipal de Arouca; Attendance: 1,071; Referee: (Portugal) Gustavo Correia

3 March 2023 23	Boavista	0–0	Arouca	Porto
19:00 WET (UTC±0)	Makouta (yellow card) 41'; Salvador Agra (yellow card) 63'	Report	Weverson (yellow card) 40'; Tiago Esgaio (yellow card) 56'; Ruiz (yellow card) 58'; Milovanov (yellow card) 67'; Galović (yellow card) 89'	Stadium: Estádio do Bessa; Attendance: 4,689; Referee: (Portugal) Luís Godinho

11 March 2023 24	Vitória de Guimarães	0–2	Arouca	Guimarães
18:00 WET (UTC±0)	André Silva (yellow card) 27'; Bamba (yellow card) 80'; André Amaro (yellow card) 90+7'	Report	Arsénio (yellow card) 36'; Galović (yellow card) 45'; Rafa Mújica 50'; Antony 77'; de Arruabarrena (yellow card) 90+7'	Stadium: Estádio D. Afonso Henriques; Attendance: 21,717; Referee: (Portugal) Hélder Malheiro

18 March 2023 25	Arouca	1–1	Paços de Ferreira	Arouca
18:00 WET (UTC±0)	Antony (yellow card) 43'; Rafa Mújica 55'; Soro (yellow card) 74'; Tiago Esgaio (yellow card) 90+3'	Report	Maracás (yellow card) 38'; Gaitán 75'; Antunes (yellow card) 82'; Matchoi Djaló (yellow card) 90+1'	Stadium: Estádio Municipal de Arouca; Attendance: 1,048; Referee: (Portugal) Vitor Ferreira

3 April 2023 26	Famalicão	0–1	Arouca	Vila Nova de Famalicão
20:15 WET (UTC±0)	Gustavo Assunção (yellow card) 90+4'	Report	Sylla 90+3' (pen.)	Stadium: Estádio Municipal 22 de Junho; Attendance: 4,030; Referee: (Portugal) Carlos Macedo

8 April 2023 27	Arouca	1–0	Marítimo	Arouca
15:30 WET (UTC±0)	Rafa Mújica 34'; João Basso (yellow card) 65'; Tiago Esgaio (yellow card) 90+1'	Report	Val (yellow card) 42'; Xadas (yellow card) 82'	Stadium: Estádio Municipal de Arouca; Attendance: 1,719; Referee: (Portugal) Nuno Almeida

16 April 2023 28	Sporting CP	1–1	Arouca	Lisbon
20:30 WET (UTC±0)	Pote 87' (pen.)	Report	Antony 38'	Stadium: Estádio José Alvalade; Attendance: 25,584; Referee: (Portugal) Vitor Ferreira

23 April 2023 29	Arouca	1–0	Vizela	Arouca
20:30 WET (UTC±0)	Sylla 12' (pen.)	Report	Anderson (yellow card) 9'	Stadium: Estádio Municipal de Arouca; Attendance: 1,742; Referee: (Portugal) Bruno Costa

28 April 2023 30	Rio Ave	1–0	Arouca	Vila do Conde
20:15 WET (UTC±0)	Patrick William (yellow card) 13'; João Graça (yellow card) 28'; Paulo Vitor 69'; Boateng (yellow card) 72'; Pantalon (red card) 90+6'; Jhonatan (yellow card) 90+9'	Report	Sylla (yellow card) 45+1'; Tiago Esgaio (yellow card) 45+4'; Opoku (yellow card) 90+6'	Stadium: Estádio dos Arcos; Attendance: 2,298; Referee: (Portugal) Ricardo Baixinho

8 May 2023 31	Arouca	0–1	Porto	Arouca
21:15 WET (UTC±0)	Sylla (yellow card) 85'	Report	Otávio (yellow card) 31'; Iván Marcano (yellow card) 31' (goal) 44'	Stadium: Estádio Municipal de Arouca; Attendance: 4,092; Referee: (Portugal) João Pinheiro

15 May 2023 32	Estoril	2–0	Arouca	Estoril
20:15 WET (UTC±0)	João Carvalho 68'; João Gamboa (yellow card) 74'; Cassiano 90+4'	Report	David Simão (yellow card) 90+8'; Arsénio (yellow card) 90+8'	Stadium: Estádio António Coimbra da Mota; Attendance: 2,826; Referee: (Portugal) Hélder Malheiro

20 May 2023 33	Arouca	1–0	Chaves	Arouca
15:30 WET (UTC±0)	Ruiz (yellow card) 43'; Antony (yellow card) 45+3'; Sylla 63' (pen.)	Report	Guima (yellow card) 13'; Obiora (yellow card) 72'; Sandro Cruz (yellow card) 78'	Stadium: Estádio Municipal de Arouca; Attendance: 1,993; Referee: (Portugal) Gustavo Correia

27 May 2023 34	Portimonense	0–2	Arouca	Portimão
18:00 WET (UTC±0)	González (yellow card) 67'	Report	Antony 49'; Ruiz 51'	Stadium: Estádio Municipal de Portimão; Attendance: 867; Referee: (Portugal) Vitor Ferreira

=== Taça de Portugal ===
15 October 2022 Third round	Fontinhas	0–2	Arouca	Angra do Heroísmo
11:00 WEST (UTC+1)		Report	Dabbagh 10'; Marques 79'	Stadium: Estádio João Paulo II; Referee: Hélder Carvalho

8 November 2022 Fourth round	Gil Vicente	1–4	Arouca	Barcelos
18:45 WET (UTC±0)	Carvalho 17'	Report	Mújica 6', 38', 58'; Velázquez 45'	Stadium: Estádio Cidade de Barcelos; Referee: Gustavo Correia

11 January 2023 Fifth round	Porto	4–0	Arouca	Porto
20:45 WET (UTC±0)	Galeno 31'; Martinez 54', 57', 90+3'	Report		Stadium: Estádio do Dragão; Referee: João Gonçalves

=== Taça da Liga ===
Pos	Team	Pld	W	D	L	GF	GA	GD	Pts	
1	Arouca	4	2	2	0	7	3	+4	8	Advance to the quarter-finals
2	Feirense	4	2	2	0	7	5	+2	8	
3	Leixões	4	2	1	1	6	5	+1	7	
4	Oliveirense	4	0	2	2	2	6	−4	2	
5	Santa Clara	4	0	1	3	6	9	−3	1	

Source: Soccerway

==== Knockout phase ====
22 December 2022 Quarter-finals	Moreirense	1–2	Arouca	Moreira de Cónegos
20:15 WET (UTC±0)	Luis 44' (pen.)	Report	Esgaio 70'; Mujica 79'	Stadium: Parque de Jogos Comendador Joaquim de Almeida Freitas; Attendance: 1,167; Referee: Nuno Almeida

24 January 2023 Semi-finals	Arouca	1–2	Sporting CP	Leiria
19:45 WET (UTC±0)	Dabbagh 58'	Report	Paulinho 45+7', 82'	Stadium: Estádio Dr. Magalhães Pessoa; Attendance: 10,259; Referee: Fábio Veríssimo

== Statistics ==
=== Goalscorers ===
Rank	Pos	No.	Nat	Name	Primeira Liga	Taça de Portugal	Taça da Liga	Total
1	FW	19	(Spain)	Rafa Mújica	8	3	3	14
2	FW	15	(Palestine)	Oday Dabbagh	7	1	3	11
3	MF	11	(Brazil)	Antony	6	0	0	6
3	DF	13	(Brazil)	João Basso	3	0	0	3
3	FW	7	(Democratic Republic of the Congo)	André Bukia	2	0	1	3
6	FW	9	(Brazil)	Bruno Marques	1	1	0	2
6	MF	10	(Argentina)	Alan Ruiz	3	0	1	4
8	MF	28	(Portugal)	Tiago Esgaio	0	0	1	1
8	MF	18	(United States)	Benji Michel	1	0	0	1
8	DF	6	(Brazil)	Mateus Quaresma	1	0	0	1
8	DF	3	(England)	Jerome Opoku	0	0	1	1
8	MF	2	(Guinea)	Morlaye Sylla	4	0	0	4
8	DF	4	(Venezuela)	José Manuel Velázquez	0	1	0	1
Own goals					0	0	0	0
Totals					36	6	10	52

Last updated: 5 February 2023
