= 2024–25 F.C. Arouca season =

F.C. Arouca
2024–25 season
- Head coach: Vasco Seabra (from 29 October)
- Stadium: Estádio Municipal de Arouca
- Primeira Liga: Pre-season
- Taça de Portugal: Pre-season
- Average home league attendance: 2,111

The 2024–25 season is the 73rd season in the history of the F.C. Arouca, and the club's fourth consecutive season in Primeira Liga. In addition to the domestic league, the team will participate in the Taça de Portugal.

== Transfers ==
=== In ===
Pos.	Player	Transferred from	Fee	Date	Source
DF	(Spain) José Fontán	(Spain) Celta Vigo		3 July 2024	
FW	(Portugal) Henrique Araújo	(Portugal) Benfica	Loan	11 July 2024	

=== Out ===
Pos.	Player	Transferred to	Fee	Date	Source
FW	(Spain) Rafa Mújica	(Qatar) Al Sadd	€10,000,000	1 July 2024	
MF	(Algeria) Yanis Hamache	(Algeria) MC Oran	Undisclosed	18 July 2024	
MF	(Portugal) Ivo Rodrigues		Contract terminated	11 December 2024	
DF	(Brazil) Mateus Quaresma		Contract terminated	30 December 2024	
GK	(Brazil) Thiago Rodrigues	(Portugal) Torreense	Contract terminated	30 December 2024	
FW	(Belarus) Vladislav Morozov	(Portugal) Paços de Ferreira	Loan	7 January 2025	

== Friendlies ==
=== Pre-season ===
The team will camp at the Luso Training Center until July 20.

7 July 2024 Friendly	Arouca (Portugal)	2–3	(Portugal) São João de Ver
13:00 UTC+1

13 July 2024 Friendly	Arouca (Portugal)	3–1	(Portugal) U.D. Oliveirense
13:00 UTC+1	Jason 9', 14'; Weverson 47'		Nagata 49'

20 July 2024 Friendly	Rio Ave (Portugal)	3–2	(Portugal) Arouca
11:00 UTC+1	5'; 90'; 90'		45'; 45'

26 July 2024 Friendly	Arouca (Portugal)	0–0	(Portugal) Tondela
10:30 UTC+1

27 July 2024 Friendly	Boavista (Portugal)	v	(Portugal) Arouca
11:00 UTC+1

3 August 2024 Friendly	Arouca (Portugal)	0–2	(Portugal) Académico de Viseu
11:00 UTC+1

== Competitions ==
=== Overall record ===
Competition	First match	Last match	Starting round	Final position	Record							
Competition	First match	Last match	Starting round	Final position	Pld	W	D	L	GF	GA	GD	Win %
Primeira Liga	12 August 2024	May 2025	Matchday 1		15	3	2	10	9	26	−17	20.00
Taça de Portugal	19 Octobre 2024	22 November 2024	Third Round	Fourth Round	2	1	0	1	6	2	+4	50.00
Total					17	4	2	11	15	28	−13	23.53

Source: Soccerway

=== Primeira Liga ===
==== League table ====
Pos	Team	Pld	W	D	L	GF	GA	GD	Pts
10	Moreirense	34	10	10	14	42	50	−8	40
11	Rio Ave	34	9	11	14	39	55	−16	38
12	Arouca	34	9	11	14	35	49	−14	38
13	Gil Vicente	34	8	10	16	34	47	−13	34
14	Nacional	34	9	7	18	32	50	−18	34

Source: Liga Portugal
Rules for classification: 1) Points; 2) Head-to-head points; 3) Head-to-head goal difference; 4) Goal difference; 5) Matches won; 6) Goals scored; 7) Play-off.

==== Results summary ====
Overall								Home						Away					
Pld	W	D	L	GF	GA	GD	Pts	W	D	L	GF	GA	GD	W	D	L	GF	GA	GD
15	3	2	10	9	26	−17	11	2	1	4	4	9	−5	1	1	6	5	17	−12

==== Results by round ====
Round	1	2	3	4	5	6	7	8	9	10	11	12	13	14	15	16
Ground	H	A	H	A	H	A	A	H	A	H	A	H	A	H	A	
Result	L	L	W	L	L	W	L	D	L	L	D	L	L	W	L	
Position	14	16	12	14	16	14	14	13	14	16	17	18	18	17	18	

A = Away; H = Home; W = Win; D = Draw; L = Loss

==== Matches ====
The match schedule was released on 7 July 2024.

12 August 2024 1	Arouca	0–1	Vitória de Guimarães	Arouca
20:15 WEST (UTC+01:00)	Weverson (yellow card) 22'; Trezza (yellow card) 43'; Rocha (yellow card) 47' (yellow-red card); Simão (yellow card) 62'; Joel Pinho (yellow card) 62'; Araújo (yellow card) 75'; Jason (yellow card) 76'	Report	Oliveira 14'; Gaspar (yellow card) 48'; Silva (yellow card) 76'	Stadium: Estádio Municipal de Arouca; Attendance: 3,394; Referee: Gustavo Correia

18 August 2024 2	Moreirense	3–1	Arouca	Moreira de Cónegos
15:30 WEST (UTC+01:00)	Luis Nlavo 9'; Alan 45+1'; Madson 65'	Report	Simão 3'; Quaresma (yellow card) 74'; Lamba (yellow card) 83'	Stadium: Parque de Jogos Comendador Joaquim de Almeida Freitas; Attendance: 1,527; Referee: João Gonçalves

25 August 2024 3	Arouca	1–0	Nacional	Arouca
15:30 WEST (UTC+01:00)	Araújo 26'; Pinho (red card) 90+5'	Report	Margarido (yellow card) 90+1'	Stadium: Estádio Municipal de Arouca; Attendance: 2,081; Referee: Sérgio Guelho

1 September 2024 4	Rio Ave	1–0	Arouca	Vila do Conde
18:00 WEST (UTC+01:00)	Clayton 43'; Freire (yellow card) 84'; Albergaria (yellow card) 90+1'	Report		Stadium: Estádio dos Arcos; Attendance: 2,558; Referee: Bruno Costa

13 September 2024 5	Arouca	0–3	Sporting CP	Arouca
20:15 WEST (UTC+01:00)	Sylla (yellow card) 54'; Fontán (yellow card) 60'; Loum (yellow card) 90+7'	Report	Pedro Gonçalves 24'; Gyökeres 73'; Trincão 80'	Stadium: Estádio Municipal de Arouca; Attendance: 4,644; Referee: João Pinheiro

23 September 2024 6	Farense	0–1	Arouca	Arouca
20:15 WEST (UTC+01:00)	Falcão (yellow card) 44'		Trezza 45+1'; Fukui (yellow card) 69'; Rodrigues (yellow card) 77'; Jason (yellow card) 90+3'; Esgaio (yellow card) 90+5'	Stadium: Estádio de São Luís; Attendance: 5.057; Referee: Luís Godinho

30 September 2024 7	Porto	4–0	Arouca	Porto
: 00:00 WEST (UTC+01:00)	Varela (yellow card) 35'; Aghehowa 47'; González 51'; Galeno 57'; Deniz Gül 85'; Mora (yellow card) 90+1'		Yalçın (yellow card) 32' (yellow-red card) 43'; Sylla (yellow card) 32'	Stadium: Estádio do Dragão; Attendance: 44.209; Referee: André Narciso

6 October 2024 8	Arouca	1–1	AVS	Arouca
12:00 WEST (UTC+01:00)	Rodrigues (yellow card) 7'; Jason 30'; Simão (yellow card) 59'; Fontán (yellow card) 75'	Report	Silva (yellow card) 45+2'; Assunção 77' (pen.); Fonseca (yellow card) 87'	Stadium: Estádio Municipal de Arouca; Attendance: 1.113; Referee: David Silva

26 October 2024 9	Estoril	4–1	Arouca	Estoril
21:30 WEST (UTC+01:00)	Garcia (yellow card) 21'; Marqués 30'; Amaral (yellow card) 40'; Pina 42'; Álvaro 64'; Robles (yellow card) 76'; Holsgrove 90'; Costa (yellow card) 90+4'	Report	Araújo 24'; Esgaio (yellow card) 36'; Loum (yellow card) 89'	Stadium: Estádio António Coimbra da Mota; Attendance: 1.686; Referee: Carlos Macedo

3 November 2024 10	Arouca	1–2	Braga	Arouca
18:00 WEST (UTC+01:00)	Trezza (yellow card) 6'; Fontán (yellow card) 9'; Simão (yellow card) 24'; Sylla 90'; Joel Pinho (red card) 90+8'	Report	Bruma 16' (pen.); Zalazar (yellow card) 28'; El Ouazzani 54'; Carvalho (yellow card) 69'	Stadium: Estádio Municipal de Arouca; Attendance: 1.631; Referee: Ricardo Baixinho

9 November 2024 11	FC Famalicão	0–0	Arouca	Famalicão
18:00 WEST (UTC+01:00)	Aranda (yellow card) 39'; Liimatta (yellow card) 49'; Amorim (yellow card) 65'; Gil Dias (yellow card) 80'; Topić (yellow card) 90'	Report	Simão (yellow card) 40'; Santos (yellow card) 56'; Jason (yellow card) 80ye'	Stadium: Estádio Municipal de Famalicão; Attendance: 3.551; Referee: Miguel Nogueira

1 December 2024 12	Arouca	0–2	Benfica	Arouca
18:00 WEST (UTC+01:00)	Loum (yellow card) 37'; Lamba (yellow card) 40'	Report	Fontán 12' (o.g.); Kökçü (yellow card) 31'; Beste (yellow card) 69'; Di María 71' (pen.); Amdouni (yellow card) 90+1'	Stadium: Estádio Municipal de Arouca; Attendance: 4.644; Referee: Luís Godinho

9 December 2024 13	Estrela Amadora	2–1	Arouca	Amadora
20:15 WEST (UTC+01:00)	Moreira (yellow card) 37'; Veiga (yellow card) 45+4'; Esgaio 58' (o.g.); Kikas (yellow card) 65'; Pinho 68'; Keliano (yellow card) 90+1'	Report	Jason 4', (yellow card) 81'; Dante (yellow card) 6'	Stadium: Estádio José Gomes; Attendance: 2.083; Referee: Fábio Veríssimo

15 December 2024 14	Arouca	1–0	Santa Clara	Arouca
15:30 WEST (UTC+01:00)	Fontán (yellow card) 63'; Jason (yellow card) 65', (goal) 67'	Report	Calila (yellow card) 66'; Ferreira (yellow card) 77'	Stadium: Estádio Municipal de Arouca; Referee: André Narciso

20 December 2024 15	Casa Pia	3–1	Arouca	Rio Maior
20:15 WEST (UTC+01:00)	Livolant 19'; Lelo 20'; Cassiano (yellow card) 61'; Obeng 88'; Beni (yellow card) 90+1'	Report	Sylla (yellow card) 18'; Weverson (yellow card) 58'; Trezza 63'; Simão (yellow card) 75'	Stadium: Estádio Municipal de Rio Maior; Attendance: 912; Referee: Anzhony Rodrigues

27 December 2024 16	Arouca	v	Gil Vicente	Arouca
20:15 WEST (UTC+01:00)		Report		Stadium: Estádio Municipal de Arouca

=== Taça de Portugal ===
19 October 2024 Third round	Maria de Fonte	0–5	Arouca	Póvoa de Lanhoso
20:15 WEST (UTC+01:00)	Macedo (yellow card) 70'		Yalçın 22', 28'; Popović (yellow card) 25'; Jason 45+1'; Araújo 66'; Santos 83' (pen.)	Stadium: Estádio Dos Moinhos Novos; Referee: João Gonçalves

22 November 2024 Fourth round	Arouca	1–2	Farense	Arouca
22:00 WEST (UTC+01:00)	Trezza 16'; Simão (yellow card) 28'; Araújo (yellow card) 90+2'; Puche (yellow card) 90+6'		Poveda 7'; Baldé 32'; Victor (yellow card) 55'; Áfrico (yellow card) 64'; Seruca (yellow card) 90+2'	Stadium: Estádio Municipal de Arouca; Referee: Fábio Veríssimo
