= João Valido =

Portuguese footballer

Personal information
- Full name: João Nuno Figueiredo Valido
- Date of birth: 3 March 2000 (age 26)
- Place of birth: Setúbal, Portugal
- Height: 1.85 m (6 ft 1 in)
- Position: Goalkeeper

Team information
- Current team: Chaves
- Number: 1

Youth career
- 2008–2016: Vitória Setúbal
- 2016–2018: Benfica
- 2018–2019: Vitória Setúbal

Senior career*
| Years | Team | Apps | (Gls) |
| 2019–2022 | Vitória Setúbal | 52 | (0) |
| 2022–2026 | Arouca | 16 | (0) |
| 2026– | Chaves | 3 | (0) |

International career
| 2018 | Portugal U18 | 2 | (0) |
| 2018–2019 | Portugal U19 | 5 | (0) |
| 2019 | Portugal U20 | 2 | (0) |
- * Club domestic league appearances and goals as of 30 August 2026

João Nuno Figueiredo Valido (born 28 April 2001) is a Portuguese professional footballer who plays as a goalkeeper for Liga Portugal 2 club Chaves.

== Professional career ==
Valido is a youth product of Vitória Setúbal and Benfica. He was first called up to the senior team of Vitória Setúbal in 2019, before debuting with them in 2020. He transferred to the Primeira Liga club Arouca on 5 July 2022, signing a 3-year contract.

== International career ==
Valido is a youth international for Portugal, having played with them up to the Portugal U20s.

== Personal life ==
Valido was a Portuguese pentathlon champion in his youth. He has type 1 diabetes.

== Career statistics ==
As of match played 23 November 2025

Appearances and goals by club, season and competition
| Club | Season | League | | | National cup | | League cup | | Europe | | Other | |
| Club | Season | Division | Apps | Goals | Apps | Goals | Apps | Goals | Apps | Goals | Apps | Goals |
|---|---|---|---|---|---|---|---|---|---|---|---|---|
| Vitória Setúbal | 2018–19 | Primeira Liga | 0 | 0 | 0 | 0 | 0 | 0 | — | | 0 | 0 |
| Vitória Setúbal | 2019–20 | Primeira Liga | 0 | 0 | 0 | 0 | 0 | 0 | — | | 0 | 0 |
| Vitória Setúbal | 2020–21 | Campeonato de Portugal | 25 | 0 | 1 | 0 | — | | — | | 26 | 0 |
| Vitória Setúbal | 2021–22 | Liga 3 | 27 | 0 | 2 | 0 | — | | — | | 29 | 0 |
| Vitória Setúbal | Total | | 52 | 0 | 3 | 0 | 0 | 0 | — | | 55 | 0 |
| Arouca | 2022–23 | Primeira Liga | 1 | 0 | 3 | 0 | 4 | 0 | — | | 8 | 0 |
| Arouca | 2023–24 | Primeira Liga | 1 | 0 | 0 | 0 | 1 | 0 | 0 | 0 | 2 | 0 |
| Arouca | 2024–25 | Primeira Liga | 5 | 0 | 1 | 0 | — | | — | | 6 | 0 |
| Arouca | 2025–26 | Primeira Liga | 9 | 0 | 1 | 0 | — | | — | | 10 | 0 |
| Arouca | Total | | 16 | 0 | 5 | 0 | 5 | 0 | 0 | 0 | 26 | 0 |
| Career total | | | 68 | 0 | 8 | 0 | 5 | 0 | 0 | 0 | 81 | 0 |
