= Oriol Busquets =

Spanish footballer (born 1999)

Personal information
- Full name: Oriol Busquets Mas
- Date of birth: 20 January 1999 (age 27)
- Place of birth: Sant Feliu, Spain
- Height: 1.85 m (6 ft 1 in)
- Position: Defensive midfielder

Team information
- Current team: Eupen
- Number: 66

Youth career
- 2007–2017: Barcelona

Senior career*
Years	Team	Apps	(Gls)
2017–2021	Barcelona B	66	(2)
2017–2020	Barcelona	0	(0)
2019–2020	→ Twente (loan)	21	(0)
2021–2022	Clermont	9	(0)
2021–2022	Clermont B	2	(0)
2022–2025	Arouca	42	(0)
2025	Andorra	7	(0)
2025–	Eupen	22	(0)

International career
2014–2015	Spain U16	8	(1)
2015–2016	Spain U17	13	(1)
2017	Spain U18	2	(0)
2016–2018	Spain U19	4	(0)
2019	Spain U21	1	(0)
- * Club domestic league appearances and goals as of 02:15, 11 May 2026 (UTC)

Oriol Busquets Mas (born 20 January 1999) is a Spanish professional footballer who plays as a defensive midfielder for Challenger Pro League club Eupen.

== Club career ==
=== Barcelona ===
Born in Sant Feliu de Guíxols, Girona, Catalonia, Busquets joined FC Barcelona's youth setup in 2007 at age 8, following a successful trial. After progressing through the ranks, he made his senior debut with the reserves on 29 April 2017, while still a youth, coming on as a late substitute for Alberto Perea in a 2–0 Segunda División B home win against AE Prat.

Busquets played his first game as a professional on 19 August 2017, starting in a 2–1 away victory over Real Valladolid in the Segunda División. His maiden appearance for the first team came on 29 November, when he started and played 62 minutes in the 5–0 defeat of Real Murcia CF in the round of 32 of the Copa del Rey.

On 9 February 2018, Busquets sustained a serious knee injury in a training session, tearing the meniscus in a fashion similar to fellow youth graduate Rafinha a year earlier. Having returned to active, he scored his first senior goal on 1 December of the same year in a 2–2 home draw with Valencia CF Mestalla.

On 27 August 2019, Busquets joined Dutch Eredivisie club FC Twente on a one-year loan. His maiden appearance in top-flight football took place on 1 September when he replaced compatriot Javier Espinosa for the final 15 minutes of a 3–1 home win over FC Utrecht, where fellow Spaniards Aitor Cantalapiedra (Twente) and Adrián Dalmau (Utrecht) also scored.

=== Clermont ===
On 28 August 2021, Busquets signed with Clermont Foot on a three-year contract. He played his first Ligue 1 match on 19 September, five minutes in the 1–1 home draw with Stade Brestois 29.

Busquets made only ten competitive appearances during his spell in France.

=== Arouca ===
Busquets moved clubs and countries again in summer 2022, joining F.C. Arouca from Portugal on a three-year deal; Clermont did not require any compensation to release him from his contract, but did retain 35% of the player's rights.

During his tenure at the Estádio Municipal de Arouca, Busquets totalled 53 games, including both legs of the 2023–24 UEFA Europa Conference League third qualifying round against Norway's SK Brann (4–3 aggregate loss).

=== Later career ===
On 24 January 2025, Busquets signed a five-month contract with FC Andorra of the Spanish Primera Federación, with the option to extend until June 2026. He was on the move again in July, however, agreeing to a two-year deal at Belgian Challenger Pro League's K.A.S. Eupen as a free agent.

== International career ==
Busquets won his only cap for Spain at under-21 level on 6 September 2019, playing the entire 1–0 win in Kazakhstan for the 2021 UEFA European Championship qualifiers.

== Personal life ==
Busquets' older brother, Pol, was also a footballer. He played as a goalkeeper, and both he and their father Jordi were developed at Barcelona.

== Career statistics ==
As of 13 March 2026

Appearances and goals by club, season and competition
Club	Season	League			National cup (Note: Includes Copa del Rey, KNVB Cup, Coupe de France, Taça de Portugal)		League cup (Note: Includes Taça da Liga)		Continental		Other		Total	
Club	Season	Division	Apps	Goals	Apps	Goals	Apps	Goals	Apps	Goals	Apps	Goals	Apps	Goals
Barcelona B	2016–17	Segunda División B	2	0	—		—		—		—		2	0
Barcelona B	2017–18	Segunda División	22	0	—		—		—		—		22	0
Barcelona B	2018–19	Segunda División B	30	1	—		—		—		—		30	1
Barcelona B	2020–21	Segunda División B	12 (Note: Includes two appearances in 2020–21 Segunda División B#Second phase)	1	—		—		—		1 (Note: Appearance in Segunda División B play-offs)	0	13	1
Barcelona B	Total		66	2	—		—		—		1	0	67	2
Barcelona	2017–18	La Liga	0	0	1	0	—		0	0	—		1	0
Barcelona	2018–19	La Liga	0	0	1	0	—		0	0	—		1	0
Barcelona	Total		0	0	2	0	—		0	0	—		2	0
Twente (loan)	2019–20	Eredivisie	21	0	2	0	—		—		—		23	0
Clermont	2021–22	Ligue 1	9	0	1	0	—		—		—		10	0
Arouca	2022–23	Primeira Liga	24	0	2	0	3	0	—		—		29	0
Arouca	2023–24	Primeira Liga	18	0	1	0	3	0	2 (Note: Appearances in UEFA Conference League)	0	—		24	0
Arouca	Total		42	0	3	0	6	0	2	0	—		53	0
Andorra	2024–25	Primera Federación	7	0	0	0	—		—		—		7	0
Eupen	2025–26	Challenger Pro League	20	0	1	1	—		—		—		21	1
Career total			165	2	9	1	6	0	2	0	1	0	183	3

== Honours ==
Barcelona

- Copa del Rey: 2017–18
- UEFA Youth League: 2017–18

Spain U17

- UEFA European Under-17 Championship runner-up: 2016
