= Bruno Marques =

Brazilian footballer (born 1999)

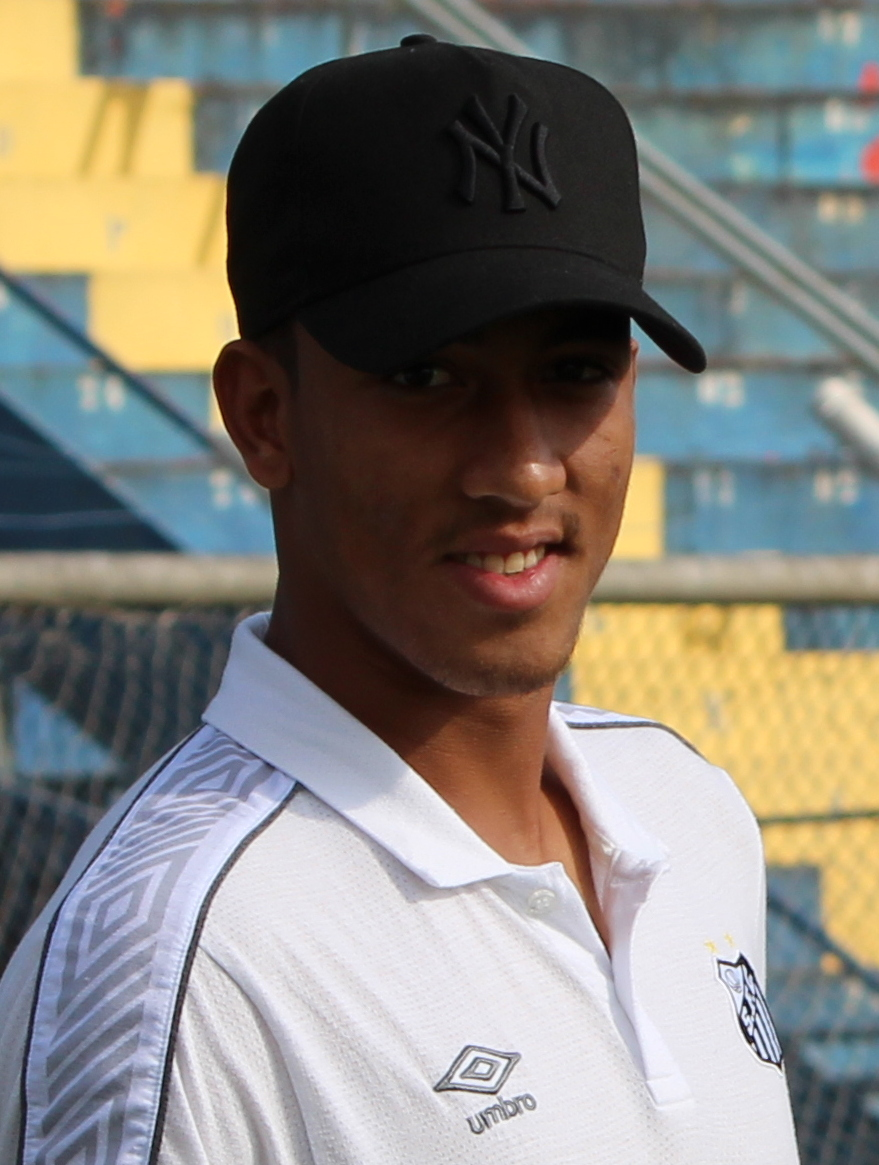
- Bruno Marques in 2019

Personal information
- Full name: Bruno Henrique Marques Torres
- Date of birth: 22 February 1999 (age 27)
- Place of birth: Recife, Brazil
- Height: 1.94 m (6 ft 4 in)
- Position: Forward

Team information
- Current team: Retrô
- Number: 22

Youth career
- Santa Cruz
- Náutico
- Lagarto
- 2018: → Fluminense (loan)
- 2018–2019: → Santos (loan)

Senior career*
Years	Team	Apps	(Gls)
2018–2021	Lagarto	7	(1)
2020–2021	→ Santos (loan)	16	(3)
2021–2024	Santos	8	(1)
2022–2023	→ Arouca (loan)	29	(2)
2023–2024	→ Marítimo (loan)	6	(1)
2023–2024	→ Marítimo B (loan)	1	(0)
2024	→ Botafogo-SP (loan)	13	(1)
2025–	Retrô	4	(0)
- * Club domestic league appearances and goals as of 16:28, 1 July 2025 (UTC)

Bruno Henrique Marques Torres (born 22 September 1999), known as Bruno Marques (Portuguese pronunciation: [ˈbɾunu ˈmaɾkɨs]) or Bruninho (Portuguese pronunciation: [bɾuˈniɲu]), is a Brazilian footballer who plays as a forward for Retrô.

== Club career ==
=== Early career ===
Born in Recife, Pernambuco, Bruno Marques started to impress while playing for Lagarto's under-19 squad. He made his first team debut on 18 February 2018, playing 25 minutes in a 0–1 Campeonato Sergipano away loss against Freipaulistano.

Bruno Marques scored his first senior goal on 24 March 2018, netting a last-minute winner in a 2–1 home success over Olímpico. In July, he was loaned to Fluminense, returning to the youth setup.

=== Santos ===
In September 2018, Bruno Marques was loaned to Santos for one year, and was assigned to the under-20 squad. On 9 December of the following year, his loan was extended for a further season.

Bruno Marques started the 2020 campaign with the B-team, being the top goalscorer of the side in the Campeonato Brasileiro de Aspirantes with seven goals. He made his first team – and Série A – debut on 28 November 2020; after coming on as a second-half substitute for Kaio Jorge, he scored his team's third in a 4–2 home win against Sport Recife.

Bruno Marques made his Copa Libertadores debut on 1 December 2020, again replacing Kaio Jorge in a 0–1 home loss against LDU Quito. Late in the month, the club announced the extension of his loan deal until the end of February, with a permanent four-year deal subsequently arranged, after exercising the buyout clause of R$ 600,000 on his contract. His new contract was signed on 1 March.

==== Loans to Arouca and Marítimo ====
On 25 January 2022, Bruno Marques moved to Portuguese Primeira Liga side Arouca on loan until June 2023. On 7 August 2023, he moved to Liga Portugal 2 team Marítimo on a one-year loan deal, but was sent back to his parent club the following 1 February.

==== Loan to Botafogo-SP ====
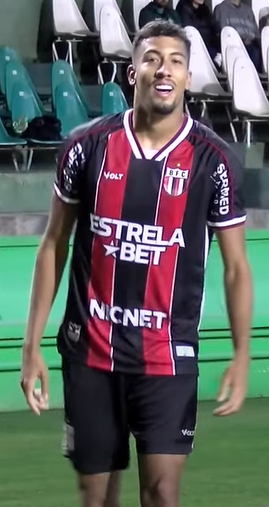
Bruno Marques in action for Botafogo-SP in 2024

On 30 July 2024, after spending more than six months without playing, Bruno Marques was loaned to fellow Série B side Botafogo-SP until the end of the year.

== Career statistics ==
As of 14 December 2024

Club	Season	League			State League		Cup		Continental		Other		Total	
Club	Season	Division	Apps	Goals	Apps	Goals	Apps	Goals	Apps	Goals	Apps	Goals	Apps	Goals
Lagarto	2018	Sergipano	—		7	1	—		—		—		7	1
Santos	2020	Série A	15	3	—		0	0	3 (Note: Appearance(s) in Copa Libertadores)	0	—		18	3
Santos	2021	Série A	2	0	7	1	2	0	4 (Note: Three appearances in Copa Libertadores, one appearance in Copa Sudamericana)	0	5 (Note: Appearance(s) in Copa Paulista)	1	20	2
Santos	2024	Série B	0	0	0	0	—		—		—		0	0
Santos	Total		17	3	7	1	2	0	7	0	5	1	38	5
Arouca (loan)	2021–22	Primeira Liga	12	1	—		—		—		—		12	1
Arouca (loan)	2022–23	Primeira Liga	11	1	—		3	1	—		2 (Note: Appearance(s) in Taça da Liga)	0	16	2
Arouca (loan)	Total		23	2	—		3	1	—		2	0	28	3
Marítimo (loan)	2023–24	Liga Portugal 2	6	1	—		2	0	—		0	0	8	1
Marítimo B (loan)	2023–24	Campeonato de Portugal	1	0	—		—		—		—		1	0
Botafogo-SP (loan)	2024	Série B	13	1	—		—		—		3	0	16	1
Retrô	2025	Série C	4	0	—		2	0	—		—		6	0
Career total			64	7	14	2	9	1	7	0	10	1	104	11
