= Alan Ruiz =

Argentine footballer

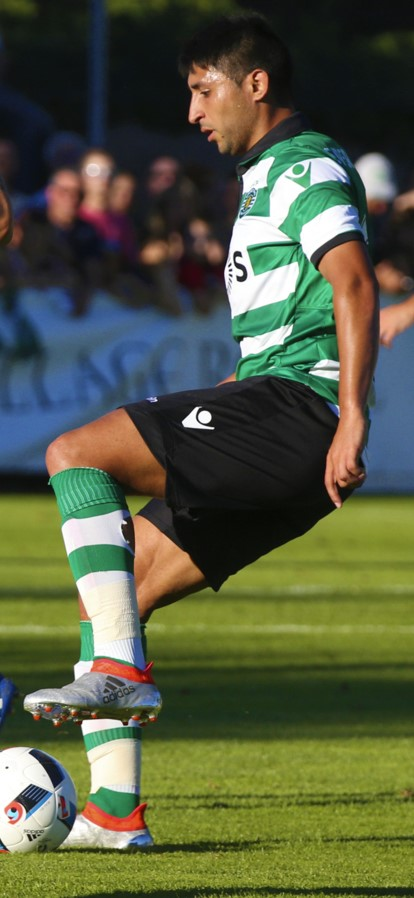
- Ruiz playing for Sporting CP in 2016

Personal information
- Full name: Alan Nahuel Ruiz
- Date of birth: 19 August 1993 (age 33)
- Place of birth: La Plata, Argentina
- Height: 1.83 m (6 ft 0 in)
- Positions: Attacking midfielder; winger

Team information
- Current team: Nueva Chicago

Youth career
- 2007–2011: Gimnasia LP

Senior career*
Years	Team	Apps	(Gls)
2011–2012	Gimnasia LP	27	(0)
2012–2016	San Lorenzo	37	(3)
2014	→ Grêmio (loan)	34	(4)
2015–2016	→ Colón (loan)	25	(8)
2016–2019	Sporting CP	28	(6)
2018–2019	→ Colón (loan)	20	(2)
2019	→ Aldosivi (loan)	7	(1)
2019–2020	Aldosivi	6	(1)
2020–2022	Arsenal de Sarandí	29	(3)
2022–2023	Arouca	40	(4)
2023–2024	Sport Recife	33	(5)
2024–2025	Estrela da Amadora	27	(1)
2026–	Nueva Chicago	2	(1)

International career
2011–2013	Argentina U20	8	(1)
2011	Argentina U23	3	(0)
- * Club domestic league appearances and goals as of 17:15, 13 April 2026 (UTC)

Alan Nahuel Ruiz (born 19 August 1993) is an Argentine professional footballer who plays as an attacking midfielder for Primera Nacional club Nueva Chicago.

== International career ==
He was called in 2011 for the Argentina U-20 National Team, as part of the squad that played on the 2011 FIFA U-20 World Cup.

== Career statistics ==
As of match played 28 October 2023

Appearances and goals by club, season and competition
Club	Season	League			National cup (Note: Includes Copa Argentina, Copa do Brasil, Taça de Portugal)		Continental		Other		Total	
Club	Season	Division	Apps	Goals	Apps	Goals	Apps	Goals	Apps	Goals	Apps	Goals
Gimnasia LP	2010–11	Primera División	7	0	0	0	—		—		7	0
Gimnasia LP	2011–12	Primera B Nacional	20	0	2	0	—		—		22	0
Gimnasia LP	Total		27	0	2	0	—		—		29	0
San Lorenzo	2012–13	Primera División	24	3	4	0	—		—		28	3
San Lorenzo	2013–14	Primera División	10	0	0	0	1 (Note: Appearance(s) in Copa Sudamericana)	0	—		11	0
San Lorenzo	2015	Primera División	3	0	1	0	2 (Note: Appearances in Copa Libertadores)	0	0	0	6	0
San Lorenzo	Total		37	3	5	0	3	0	0	0	45	3
Grêmio (loan)	2014	Série A	23	4	1	0	5	1	11 (Note: Appearances in Campeonato Gaúcho)	0	40	5
Colón (loan)	2015	Primera División	16	1	0	0	—		—		16	1
Colón (loan)	2016	Primera División	9	7	0	0	—		—		9	7
Colón (loan)	Total		25	8	0	0	—		—		25	8
Sporting CP	2016–17	Primeira Liga	23	6	2	0	0	0	1 (Note: Appearance(s) in Taça da Liga)	1	26	7
Sporting CP	2017–18	Primeira Liga	5	0	1	0	1 (Note: Appearance in UEFA Champions League)	0	1	0	8	0
Sporting CP	Total		28	6	3	0	1	0	2	1	34	7
Colón (loan)	2017–18	Primera División	14	2	2	0	2	0	—		18	2
Colón (loan)	2018–19	Primera División	6	0	0	0	4	0	—		10	0
Colón (loan)	Total		20	2	2	0	6	0	—		28	2
Aldosivi (loan)	2018–19	Primera División	7	1	1	0	—		4 (Note: Appearance(s) in Copa de la Superliga)	0	12	1
Aldosivi	2019–20	Primera División	6	1	1	0	—		1	0	8	1
Aldosivi	Total		13	2	2	0	—		5	0	20	2
Arsenal de Sarandí	2020–21	Primera División	29	3	1	0	6	0	—		36	3
Arouca	2021–22	Primeira Liga	9	1	0	0	—		0	0	9	1
Arouca	2022–23	Primeira Liga	31	3	3	0	—		6	1	40	4
Arouca	Total		40	4	3	0	—		6	1	49	5
Sport Recife	2023	Série B	17	2	0	0	—		0	0	17	2
Career total			259	34	19	0	21	1	24	2	323	37

== Honours ==
San Lorenzo

- Argentine Primera División: 2013 Torneo Inicial

Sport Recife

- Campeonato Pernambucano: 2024

== Personal ==
He is the younger brother of Federico Ruiz.
