= Alfonso Trezza =

Uruguayan footballer (born 1999)

Personal information
- Full name: Alfonso Trezza Hernández
- Date of birth: 22 June 1999 (age 27)
- Place of birth: Florida, Uruguay
- Height: 1.66 m (5 ft 5 in)
- Position: Winger

Team information
- Current team: Arouca
- Number: 19

Youth career
- Club Atlético Florida
- Nacional

Senior career*
Years	Team	Apps	(Gls)
2020–2023	Nacional	103	(9)
2023–	Arouca	100	(14)
- * Club domestic league appearances and goals as of 6 November 2026

Alfonso Trezza Hernández (born 22 June 1999) is a Uruguayan professional footballer who plays as a winger for Primeira Liga club Arouca.

== Career ==
Trezza began at his local team Club Atlético Florida, before moving to the youth team of Nacional. Trezza was part of club's under-20 team which won 2018 U-20 Copa Libertadores. After rising through Nacional's youth ranks, he was promoted to the first team in 2020, by coach Gustavo Munúa. He made his professional debut on 27 August 2020 in a 2–1 league win against Progreso. He scored his first goal on 22 October 2020 in a 2–0 Copa Libertadores win against Alianza Lima.

On 16 August 2023, Primeira Liga club Arouca announced the signing of Trezza on a four-year contract.

== Career statistics ==
As of match played 24 October 2026

Appearances and goals by club, season and competition
Club	Season	League			National cup		League cup		Continental		Other		Total	
Club	Season	Division	Apps	Goals	Apps	Goals	Apps	Goals	Apps	Goals	Apps	Goals	Apps	Goals
Nacional	2020	UPD	26	0	—		—		8 (Note: Appearances in Copa Libertadores.)	1	4 (Note: Two appearances in Championship playoffs and one appearance each in Torneo Apertura decider and Torneo Intermedio final.)	0	38	1
Nacional	2021	UPD	27	4	—		—		4 (Note: Three appearances in Copa Libertadores and one appearance in Copa Sudamericana.)	0	1 (Note: Appearance in Supercopa Uruguaya.)	0	32	4
Nacional	2022	UPD	30	3	0	0	—		9 (Note: Six appearances and one goal in Copa Libertadores, three appearances in Copa Sudamericana.)	1	2 (Note: One appearance each in Torneo Intermedio final and championship playoff.)	0	41	4
Nacional	2023	UPD	20	2	0	0	—		7	1	1	0	28	3
Nacional	Total		103	9	0	0	0	0	28	3	8	0	139	12
Arouca	2023–24	Primeira Liga	24	0	3	1	2	0	0	0	—		29	1
Arouca	2024–25	Primeira Liga	33	5	2	1	—		—		—		35	6
Arouca	2025–26	Primeira Liga	32	9	2	0	—		—		—		34	9
Arouca	2026–27	Primeira Liga	9	0	1	0	—		—		—		10	0
Arouca	Total		98	14	8	2	2	0	0	0	0	0	108	16
Career total			201	23	8	2	2	0	28	3	8	0	247	28

== Honours ==
Nacional U20

- U-20 Copa Libertadores: 2018

Nacional

- Uruguayan Primera División: 2020, 2022
- Supercopa Uruguaya: 2021
