= Ignacio de Arruabarrena =

Uruguayan footballer (born 1997)

Personal information
- Full name: Ignacio de Arruabarrena Fernández
- Date of birth: 16 January 1997 (age 29)
- Place of birth: Montevideo, Uruguay
- Height: 1.86 m (6 ft 1 in)
- Position: Goalkeeper

Team information
- Current team: Arouca
- Number: 12

Youth career
- Montevideo Wanderers

Senior career*
Years	Team	Apps	(Gls)
2017–2022	Montevideo Wanderers	120	(0)
2018	→ Tacuarembó (loan)	13	(0)
2022–2024	Arouca	61	(0)
2024	Al Wehda	2	(0)
2025–2026	Barcelona SC	29	(0)
2026–	Arouca	16	(0)

International career^{‡}
2015	Uruguay U20	1	(0)
2020	Uruguay U23	8	(0)
2026–	Uruguay	1	(0)
- * Club domestic league appearances and goals as of 25 May 2026 ‡ National team caps and goals as of 18 November 2026

Ignacio de Arruabarrena Fernández (born 16 January 1997) is a Uruguayan professional footballer who plays as a goalkeeper for Primeira Liga club Arouca and the Uruguay national team.

== Club career ==
De Arruabarrena started his senior career at Montevideo Wanderers in 2017, and was loaned out to Tacuarembó in 2018.

In May 2022, De Arruabarrena joined Primeira Liga club Arouca.

In July 2024, he signed for Saudi side Al Wehda.

On 13 February 2025, De Arruabarrena moved to Ecuador, joining LigaPro Serie A club Barcelona SC on a two-year contract.

On 13 January 2026, he returned to Arouca, signing a contract until the end of the 2025–26 season, with an option for a further year.

== International career ==
De Arruabarrena has represented Uruguay at various youth levels. In December 2019, he was named in Uruguay's squad for the 2020 CONMEBOL Pre-Olympic Tournament.

In November 2026, de Arruabarrena received his first call-up to the Uruguay national team. He made his debut on 17 November 2026 in a 5–0 win over the Dominican Republic.

== Career statistics ==
=== Club ===
As of match played 14 December 2025

Appearances and goals by club, season and competition
Club	Season	League			National cup		League cup		Continental		Other		Total	
Club	Season	Division	Apps	Goals	Apps	Goals	Apps	Goals	Apps	Goals	Apps	Goals	Apps	Goals
Montevideo Wanderers	2017	Uruguayan Primera División	0	0	—		—		2 (Note: Appearances in Copa Libertadores)	0	—		2	0
Montevideo Wanderers	2018	Uruguayan Primera División	14	0	—		—		0	0	—		14	0
Montevideo Wanderers	2019	Uruguayan Primera División	37	0	—		—		6 (Note: Appearances in Copa Sudamericana)	0	—		43	0
Montevideo Wanderers	2020	Uruguayan Primera División	34	0	—		—		—		1 (Note: Appearance in Torneo Intermedio final)	0	35	0
Montevideo Wanderers	2021	Uruguayan Primera División	23	0	—		—		0	0	1 (Note: Appearance in Supercopa Uruguaya)	0	24	0
Montevideo Wanderers	2022	Uruguayan Primera División	12	0	0	0	—		4	0	—		16	0
Montevideo Wanderers	Total		120	0	0	0	—		12	0	2	0	134	0
Tacuarembó (loan)	2018	Uruguayan Segunda División	13	0	—		—		—		—		13	0
Arouca	2022–23	Primeira Liga	30	0	0	0	2	0	—		—		32	0
Arouca	2023–24	Primeira Liga	31	0	0	0	1	0	2 (Note: Appearances in UEFA Europa Conference League)	0	—		34	0
Arouca	Total		61	0	0	0	3	0	2	0	—		66	0
Al Wehda	2024–24	Saudi Pro League	2	0	0	0	—		—		—		2	0
Barcelona	2025	Ecuadorian Serie A	29	0	1	0	—		2 (Note: Appearances in Copa Libertadores)	0	—		32	0
Career total			225	0	1	0	2	0	16	0	2	0	247	0

=== International ===
As of match played 17 November 2026

Appearances and goals by national team and year
National team	Year	Apps	Goals
Uruguay	2026	1	0
Total		1	0
