= Pedro Moreira (footballer, born 1989) =

Portuguese footballer

Personal information
- Full name: Pedro Manuel da Silva Moreira
- Date of birth: 15 March 1989 (age 37)
- Place of birth: Lousada, Portugal
- Height: 1.82 m (6 ft 0 in)
- Position: Midfielder

Youth career
- 1998–2001: Lousada
- 2002: Boavista
- 2002–2003: Pasteleira
- 2003–2007: Boavista

Senior career*
Years	Team	Apps	(Gls)
2007–2008	Boavista	6	(0)
2008–2015	Porto	0	(0)
2008–2009	→ Boavista (loan)	28	(2)
2009–2010	→ Gil Vicente (loan)	26	(0)
2010–2011	→ Portimonense (loan)	21	(2)
2011–2012	→ Gil Vicente (loan)	13	(0)
2012–2014	Porto B	67	(4)
2014–2015	→ Rio Ave (loan)	26	(3)
2015–2018	Rio Ave	48	(2)
2018–2019	Hermannstadt	9	(0)
2020–2025	Arouca	66	(1)
Total		310	(14)

International career
2004–2005	Portugal U16	9	(0)
2005–2006	Portugal U17	13	(1)
2007	Portugal U18	1	(0)
2008	Portugal U19	6	(0)
2009–2010	Portugal U21	10	(0)
- * Club domestic league appearances and goals

Pedro Manuel da Silva Moreira (born 15 March 1989) is a Portuguese former professional footballer who played as a midfielder.

== Club career ==
=== Boavista ===
Moreira was born in Lousada, Porto District. He made his Primeira Liga debut in 2007–08 with Boavista FC, his first match in the competition being on 16 December 2007 in a 2–0 home win against Associação Naval 1º de Maio where he came on as a last-minute substitute, also being booked; in spite of a 9th-place finish, the season ended in relegation due to the Apito Dourado affair.

=== Porto ===
In summer 2008, Moreira signed for FC Porto as a 19-year-old. He spent the next four years on loan in both the top division and the Segunda Liga, to Boavista, Gil Vicente F.C. (twice) and Portimonense SC.

From 2012 to 2014, Moreira competed with Porto's reserves in the second tier, where he acted as captain. In the latter campaign, he helped his team to finish second by contributing 38 appearances and four goals, but they were ineligible for promotion.

=== Rio Ave ===
Moreira was loaned to fellow top-flight club Rio Ave F.C. in June 2014. He totalled 41 games with four goals for the season, including seven to help his team to reach the group phase of the UEFA Europa League.

On 22 July 2015, Moreira joined Rio Ave on a permanent three-year contract.

=== Later career ===
Moreira agreed to a deal at FC Hermannstadt of the Romanian Liga I on 18 October 2018. He returned to Portugal in February 2020, signing with F.C. Arouca in the third tier and going on to achieve two promotions in as many years.

On 2 June 2022, aged 33, Moreira renewed his link at the Estádio Municipal de Arouca until 2024. He retired in June 2025, being immediately appointed his last club's team manager.

== International career ==
Moreira won 39 caps for Portugal across all youth levels. His under-21 bow took place on 11 July 2009, in a 1–0 loss against Cape Verde in the Lusofonia Games.
