= Matías Rocha =

Uruguayan footballer (born 2000)

Personal information
- Full name: Matías Emiliano Rocha Calderón
- Date of birth: 13 February 2001 (age 25)
- Place of birth: Paysandú, Uruguay
- Height: 1.83 m (6 ft 0 in)
- Position: Centre-back

Team information
- Current team: Unión Santa Fe
- Number: 4

Youth career
- Defensor Sporting

Senior career*
Years	Team	Apps	(Gls)
2020–2023	Defensor Sporting	68	(1)
2023–2026	Arouca	27	(1)
2026–	Unión Santa Fe	6	(0)
- * Club domestic league appearances and goals as of 17:23, 22 November 2026 (UTC)

Matías Emiliano Rocha Calderón (born 13 February 2001) is a Uruguayan professional footballer who plays as a centre-back for AFA Liga Profesional de Fútbol club Unión Santa Fe.

== Club career ==
Rocha is a youth product of Defensor Sporting, and on 22 December 2020 signed a professional contract with the club for 3 seasons. He was part of the Defensor side that earned promotion to the Uruguayan Primera División in 2021, and won the 2022 Copa Uruguay. In the summer of 2023, he was due to transfer to the Argentine club Unión de Santa Fe, but the move fell through. Instead on 11 August 2023, he transferred to the Primeira Liga club Arouca on a 4-year contract.

== International career ==
Rocha was called up to the Uruguay U20s in October 2020.

== Career statistics ==
As of 3 September 2023.

Club statistics
Club	Division	League			Cup		Continental		Total	
Club	Division	Season	Apps	Goals	Apps	Goals	Apps	Goals	Apps	Goals
Defensor Sporting	Uruguayan Primera División	2020	13	0	—		—		13	0
Defensor Sporting	Uruguayan Segunda División	2021	17	1	—		—		17	1
Defensor Sporting	Uruguayan Primera División	2022	25	0	—		—		25	0
Defensor Sporting	Uruguayan Primera División	2023	13	0	—		1	0	14	0
Defensor Sporting	Total		68	1	0	0	1	0	69	1
Arouca	Primeira Liga	2023-24	2	0	0	0	0	0	2	0
Total			70	1	0	0	0	0	71	1

== Honour ==
Defensor Sporting

- Copa Uruguay: 2022
