= Rafa Mujica =

Spanish footballer

Personal information
- Full name: Rafael Sebastián Mujica García
- Date of birth: 29 October 1998 (age 28)
- Place of birth: Las Palmas, Spain
- Height: 1.85 m (6 ft 1 in)
- Positions: Forward; winger

Team information
- Current team: Al Sadd
- Number: 19

Youth career
- Las Palmas
- 2015–2017: Barcelona

Senior career*
Years	Team	Apps	(Gls)
2016–2019	Barcelona B	60	(10)
2018	→ Cornellà (loan)	16	(6)
2019–2021	Leeds United	0	(0)
2019–2020	→ Extremadura (loan)	7	(0)
2020	→ Villarreal B (loan)	4	(3)
2020–2021	→ Oviedo (loan)	4	(0)
2021	→ Las Palmas (loan)	13	(1)
2021–2022	Las Palmas	14	(1)
2022–2024	Arouca	57	(28)
2024–	Al Sadd	38	(27)

International career
2016	Spain U19	2	(0)
- * Club domestic league appearances and goals as of 17 July 2026

Rafael Sebastián Mujica García (Spanish pronunciation: [ˈrafa ˈmuxika]; born 29 October 1998) is a Spanish professional footballer who plays for Qatari club Al Sadd. Mainly a forward, he can also play as a winger.

He represented Spain at under-19 level.

== Club career ==
=== Barcelona ===
Born in Las Palmas, Canary Islands, Mújica joined Barcelona's youth setup on 19 May 2015, from Las Palmas. On 26 March 2016, aged only 17, he made his senior debut with the reserves by coming on as a late substitute for Juan Cámara in a 2–0 Segunda División B away win against Llosetense.

Mujica scored his first senior goal on 9 April 2016, netting his team's only strike in a 1–3 home loss against Sabadell. He played for the first team during the 2016–17 pre-season under manager Luis Enrique, including scoring against English side Leicester City in a 4–2 victory during a pre-season friendly on 4 August.

In February 2017, Mujica suffered a hamstring rupture which required surgery, which hampered his progress, keeping him sidelined for nine-and-a-half months and missing out the club's promotion in the play-offs. He made his professional debut on 6 January 2018, replacing Vitinho in a 1–1 away draw against Real Zaragoza in the Segunda División.

On 31 January 2018, Mujica was loaned to Cornellà in the third division, until June. He contributed with six goals in 16 matches for the side; highlights included scoring in the season's Copa Catalunya final in a 3–2 victory against UA Horta on 2 June, to help the club lift the trophy for the first time.

After his loan spell, Mujica returned to Barcelona, training with the first team during the summer of 2018. He returned to the B-team for the 2018–19 season, and played 33 games for the side scoring seven goals and providing one assist in Segunda División B during the season.

In January 2019, Mujica was also named by manager Ernesto Valverde in Barcelona's first team squad for the Copa del Rey fixture against Levante. On 27 June, Mújica announced on his official Twitter page he would be leaving Barcelona, and the club officially released him when his contract expired three days later.

=== Leeds United ===
On 4 July 2019, Leeds United announced the signing of Mujica on a three-year contract, running until the summer of 2022. He would initially be part of Carlos Corberán's under-23 team. On 23 August 2019, Mujica joined Extremadura in the Spanish Segunda División on a one-year loan deal, with the option to buy. He made his debut for the club on 1 September, in a 2–1 loss against Cadiz, but returned to his parent club early in January 2020, having made just seven league appearances for Extremadura.

On 24 January 2020, Mujica joined Villarreal on loan until the end of the season, being assigned to the B-team. On 26 August, he moved to second division club Real Oviedo on a season-long loan.

=== Las Palmas ===
On 1 February 2021, after leaving Oviedo early, Mujica joined his hometown club Las Palmas on loan until the end of the second-tier season. On 2 July, the move was made permanent for an undisclosed fee.

=== Arouca ===
On 21 June 2022, Mujica moved to Portuguese Primeira Liga side Arouca on a two-year deal. This is when Rafa Mujica played his best football scoring 28 goals in 57 games for the club and winning a Forward Of The League award.

=== Al Sadd ===
On 30 May 2024, it was announced Mújica would join Qatari club Al Sadd SC at the opening of the transfer window on 1 July 2024, costing a fee of €10 million, and signing a four-year contract.

== International career ==
He has represented Spain at international level up to under-19s.

== Career statistics ==
As of match played 27 April 2026

Appearances and goals by club, season and competition
Club	Season	League			National cup (Note: Includes Copa del Rey, Taça de Portugal, Qatar Cup)		League cup (Note: Includes Taça da Liga)		Continental		Other		Total	
Club	Season	Division	Apps	Goals	Apps	Goals	Apps	Goals	Apps	Goals	Apps	Goals	Apps	Goals
Barcelona B	2015–16	Segunda División B	6	1	—		—		—		—		6	1
Barcelona B	2016–17	Segunda División B	18	2	—		—		—		—		18	2
Barcelona B	2017–18	Segunda División	3	0	—		—		—		—		3	0
Barcelona B	2018–19	Segunda División B	33	7	—		—		—		—		33	7
Barcelona B	Total		60	10	—		—		—		—		60	10
Cornellà (loan)	2017–18	Segunda División B	16	6	—		—		—		—		16	6
Leeds United U21	2019–20	—	0	0	—		—		—		—		0	0
Extremadura (loan)	2019–20	Segunda División	7	0	1	0	—		—		—		8	0
Villarreal B (loan)	2019–20	Segunda División B	7	4	—		—		—		—		7	4
Real Oviedo (loan)	2020–21	Segunda División	4	0	1	2	—		—		—		5	2
Las Palmas (loan)	2020–21	Segunda División	13	1	—		—		—		—		13	1
Las Palmas	2021–22	Segunda División	16	1	1	0	—		—		—		17	1
Las Palmas	Total		29	2	1	0	—		—		—		30	2
Arouca	2022–23	Primeira Liga	27	8	1	3	4	3	—		—		32	14
Arouca	2023–24	Primeira Liga	30	20	3	1	2	1	2 (Note: Appearances in UEFA Europa Conference League)	1	—		36	23
Arouca	Total		57	28	4	4	6	4	2	1	—		68	37
Al Sadd	2024–25	Qatar Stars League	18	18	2	2	2	0	7 (Note: Appearances in AFC Champions League Elite)	0	1 (Note: Appearance in UAE–Qatar Super Shield)	0	30	20
Al Sadd	2025–26	Qatar Stars League	20	9	0	0	2	0	10 (Note: Appearances in AFC Champions League Elite)	8	0	0	32	17
Al Sadd	Total		38	27	2	2	4	0	17	8	1	0	62	37
Career total			218	77	8	8	8	4	19	9	1	0	256	98

== Honours ==
Barcelona Youth

- UEFA Youth League: 2017–18

Barcelona B

- Segunda División B: 2016–17

UE Cornellà

- Copa Catalunya: 2017–18

Al Sadd

- Qatar Stars League: 2024–25

Individual

- Primeira Liga Player of the Month: February 2024,
- Primeira Liga Forward of the Month: February 2024,
- Primeira Liga Team of the Year: 2023–24
- AFC Champions League Elite top scorer: 2025–26
