= Yaw Moses =

Ghanaian footballer

Personal information
- Date of birth: 7 January 1999 (age 27)
- Place of birth: Accra, Ghana
- Height: 1.70 m (5 ft 7 in)
- Position: Midfielder

Team information
- Current team: İmişli
- Number: 6

Youth career
- –2017: Charity Stars
- 2017–2018: Arouca

Senior career*
Years	Team	Apps	(Gls)
2017–2024	Arouca	44	(1)
2024–2025	Torreense	0	(0)
2025–	İmişli	20	(0)
- * Club domestic league appearances and goals as of 22 June 2026

Yaw Moses (born 7 January 1999) is a Ghanaian footballer who plays as a midfielder for Azerbaijani club İmişli.

== Career statistics ==
=== Club ===
As of 9 January 2019.

Club	Season	League			Cup		Other		Total	
Club	Season	Division	Apps	Goals	Apps	Goals	Apps	Goals	Apps	Goals
Arouca	2017–18	LigaPro	4	0	0	0	0	0	4	0
Arouca	2018–19	LigaPro	0	0	0	0	0	0	0	0
Career total			4	0	0	0	0	0	4	0
