= Rafael Fernandes (footballer) =

Portuguese footballer (born 2002)

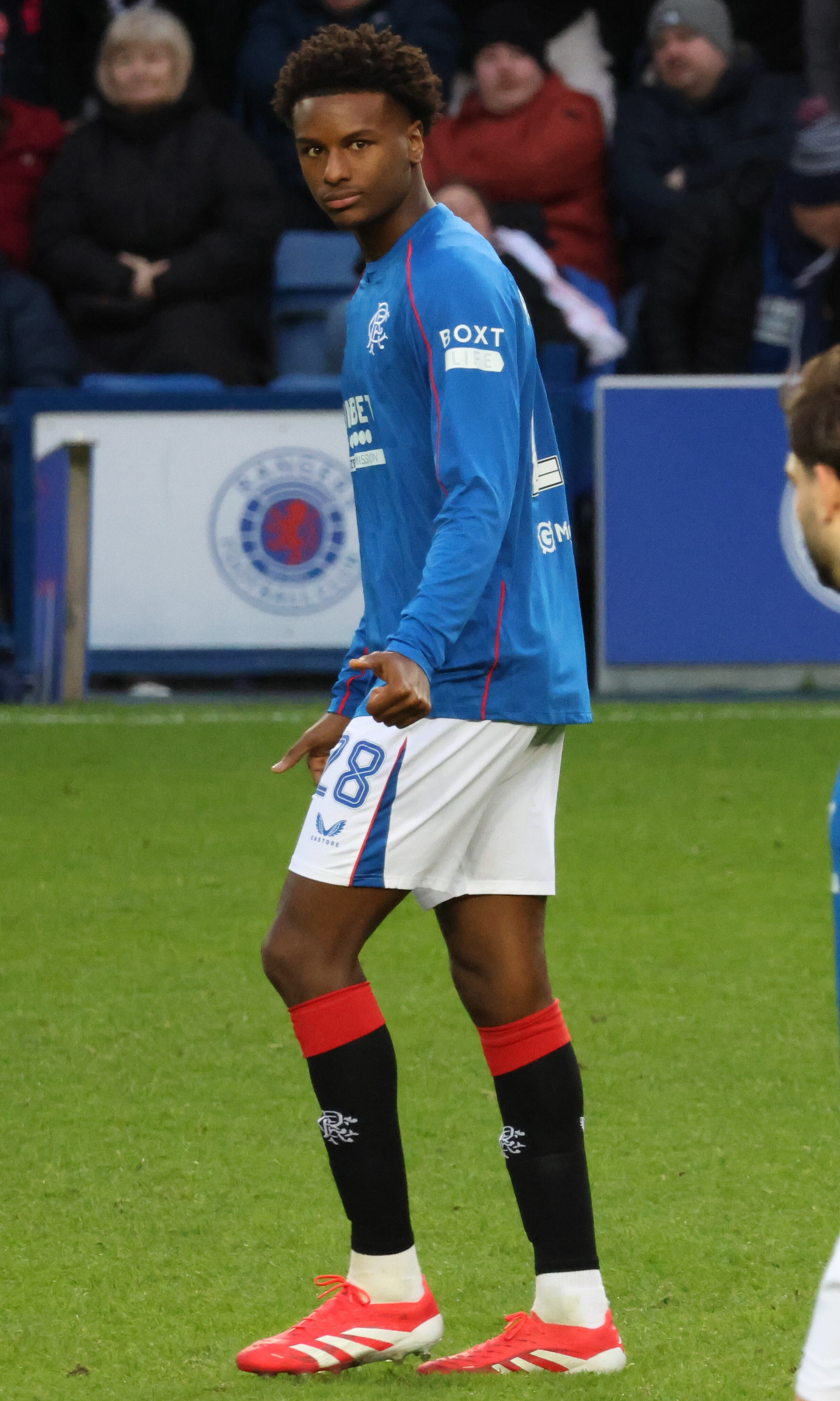

Personal information
- Full name: Rafael Tavares Gomes Fernandes
- Date of birth: 28 June 2002 (age 24)
- Height: 1.91 m (6 ft 3 in)
- Position: Centre-back

Team information
- Current team: Marítimo (on loan from Lille)

Youth career
- 2010–2021: Sporting CP

Senior career*
| Years | Team | Apps | (Gls) |
| 2021–2022 | Sporting CP B | 16 | (3) |
| 2022–2024 | Arouca | 13 | (0) |
| 2024– | Lille | 0 | (0) |
| 2024– | Lille II | 8 | (0) |
| 2025 | → Rangers (loan) | 3 | (0) |
| 2026– | → Marítimo (loan) | 0 | (0) |

International career^{‡}
| 2018-2020 | Portugal U18 | 6 | (0) |
| 2021–2022 | Portugal U20 | 5 | (0) |
- * Club domestic league appearances and goals as of 17 May 2026 ‡ National team caps and goals as of 23:04, 14 November 2023 (UTC)

Rafael Tavares Gomes Fernandes (born 28 June 2002) is a Portuguese professional footballer who plays as a centre-back for Primeira Liga club Marítimo on loan from Ligue 1 club Lille.

== Professional career ==
=== Sporting CP ===
A youth product of Sporting CP since 2010, he started playing with their reserves in the 2021-22 season.

=== Arouca ===
On 11 July 2022, he transferred to Arouca in the Primeira Liga signing a three-year contract. He made his professional debut as a half-time substitute in a 4–0 Primeira Liga loss to Benfica on 5 August 2022.

=== Lille ===
On 31 January 2024, Fernandes moved to Ligue 1 side Lille, signing a four-and-a-half-year contract. The French club paid a reported €3 million transfer fee.

==== Loan to Rangers ====
On 18 January 2025, Fernandes signed for Scottish Premiership side Rangers on loan.

==== Loan to Marítimo ====
On 2 July 2026, Fernandes was loaned by Marítimo for the 2026–27 season.

== International career ==
Fernandes is a youth international for Portugal, having played for the Portugal U18s and U20s.. He's also eligible to represent Cape Verde.
