= João Basso =

Brazilian footballer

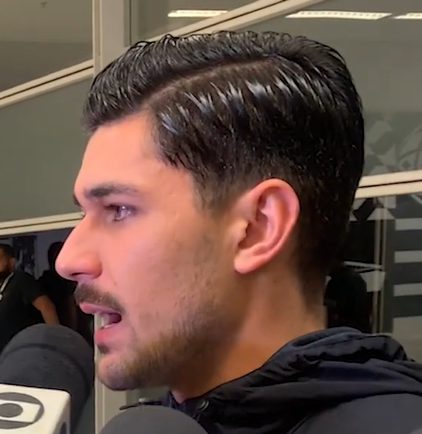
- Basso in 2023

Personal information
- Full name: João Othavio Basso
- Date of birth: 13 January 1997 (age 29)
- Place of birth: Curitiba, Brazil
- Height: 1.87 m (6 ft 2 in)
- Position: Centre-back

Team information
- Current team: Cuiabá
- Number: 13

Youth career
- 2004–2011: Atlético Paranaense
- 2011–2013: Andraus
- 2013–2016: Paraná

Senior career*
Years	Team	Apps	(Gls)
2015–2016	Paraná	22	(0)
2016–2019	Estoril	3	(1)
2017–2018	→ Real Massamá (loan)	22	(2)
2019–2023	Arouca	118	(18)
2023–2026	Santos	35	(3)
2024	→ Estoril (loan)	14	(1)
2026–	Cuiabá	34	(2)
- * Club domestic league appearances and goals as of 18 November 2026

João Othavio Basso (born 13 January 1997) is a Brazilian professional footballer who plays as a centre-back for Cuiabá.

== Career ==
=== Paraná ===
Born in Curitiba, Paraná, Basso joined Paraná Clube's youth categories from Andraus, after representing Atlético Paranaense. He made his first team debut on 28 November 2015, coming on as a late substitute for Carlão in a 1–1 Série B away draw against Sampaio Corrêa.

Basso was definitely promoted to the main squad by head coach Claudinei Oliveira on 9 February 2016, and started to become a regular starter for the club during the year's Série B under Marcelo Martelotte, but as a defensive midfielder.

=== Estoril ===
On 24 August 2016, Basso moved abroad and was announced at Portuguese Primeira Liga side Estoril Praia. He made his debut for the club on 26 October, starting in a 1–0 away loss against Moreirense, for the season's Taça da Liga.

Basso made his debut in the main category of Portuguese football on 13 January 2017, replacing compatriot Eduardo Teixeira and scoring the equalizer in a 2–1 away loss against Arouca.

==== Loan to Real Massamá ====
On 27 July 2017, after just one more match, Basso was loaned to LigaPro side Real Massamá, for one year. He scored twice in 23 appearances overall for the club, before returning to Estoril and being mainly utilized in the under-23 team.

=== Arouca ===
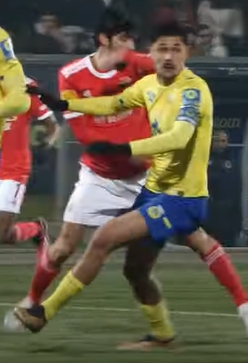
Basso (in yellow) playing for Arouca in 2023

On 31 August 2019, Basso signed for Arouca in the Campeonato de Portugal. An immediate starter, he contributed with the club's two consecutive promotions, and renewed his contract until 2024 on 19 August 2022.

Basso acted as team captain during the 2022–23 campaign, as Arouca qualified to the UEFA Europa Conference League.

=== Santos ===
On 31 July 2023, Basso returned to his home country after agreeing to a three-and-a-half-year contract with Santos in the Série A. He made his debut for the club on 5 August, starting in a 1–1 home draw against Athletico Paranaense.

==== Loan to Estoril ====
On 30 January 2024, following Santos' relegation to the Série B, Basso returned to Estoril on loan until the end of the 2023–24 season.

==== Return from loan ====
After returning to Santos in July 2024, Basso scored his first goal for the club on 31 August, netting the club's second in a 2–2 home draw against Ponte Preta. A backup option in the following years, he terminated his link with Peixe on 3 March 2026.

== Career statistics ==
As of 13 February 2026

Appearances and goals by club, season and competition
Club	Season	League			State league		Cup		Continental		Other		Total	
Club	Season	Division	Apps	Goals	Apps	Goals	Apps	Goals	Apps	Goals	Apps	Goals	Apps	Goals
Paraná	2015	Série B	1	0	0	0	0	0	—		—		1	0
Paraná	2016	Série B	14	0	7	0	1	0	—		—		22	0
Paraná	Total		15	0	7	0	1	0	—		—		23	0
Estoril	2016–17	Primeira Liga	2	1	—		1	0	—		1 (Note: Appearance(s) in Taça da Liga)	0	4	1
Estoril	2018–19	LigaPro	1	0	—		0	0	—		0	0	1	0
Estoril	Total		3	1	—		1	0	—		1	0	5	1
Real Massamá (loan)	2017–18	LigaPro	22	2	—		1	0	—		—		23	2
Arouca	2019–20	Campeonato de Portugal	20	5	—		3	0	—		—		23	5
Arouca	2020–21	Liga Portugal 2	33	7	—		1	0	—		2 (Note: Appearance(s) in the Promotion/relegation play-offs)	0	36	7
Arouca	2021–22	Primeira Liga	33	3	—		1	0	—		2	1	36	4
Arouca	2022–23	Primeira Liga	32	3	—		3	0	—		6	0	41	3
Arouca	Total		118	18	—		8	0	—		10	1	137	19
Santos	2023	Série A	14	0	—		—		—		—		14	0
Santos	2024	Série B	8	2	0	0	—		—		—		8	2
Santos	2025	Série A	6	1	5	0	1	0	—		—		12	1
Santos	2026	Série A	2	0	0	0	0	0	0	0	—		2	0
Santos	Total		30	3	5	0	1	0	0	0	—		36	3
Estoril (loan)	2023–24	Primeira Liga	14	1	—		—		—		—		14	1
Career total			202	25	12	0	12	0	0	0	11	1	237	26

== Honours ==
Santos

- Campeonato Brasileiro Série B: 2024

Individual

- Primeira Liga Defender of the Month: March 2023
