= André Bukia =

Congolese footballer (born 1995)

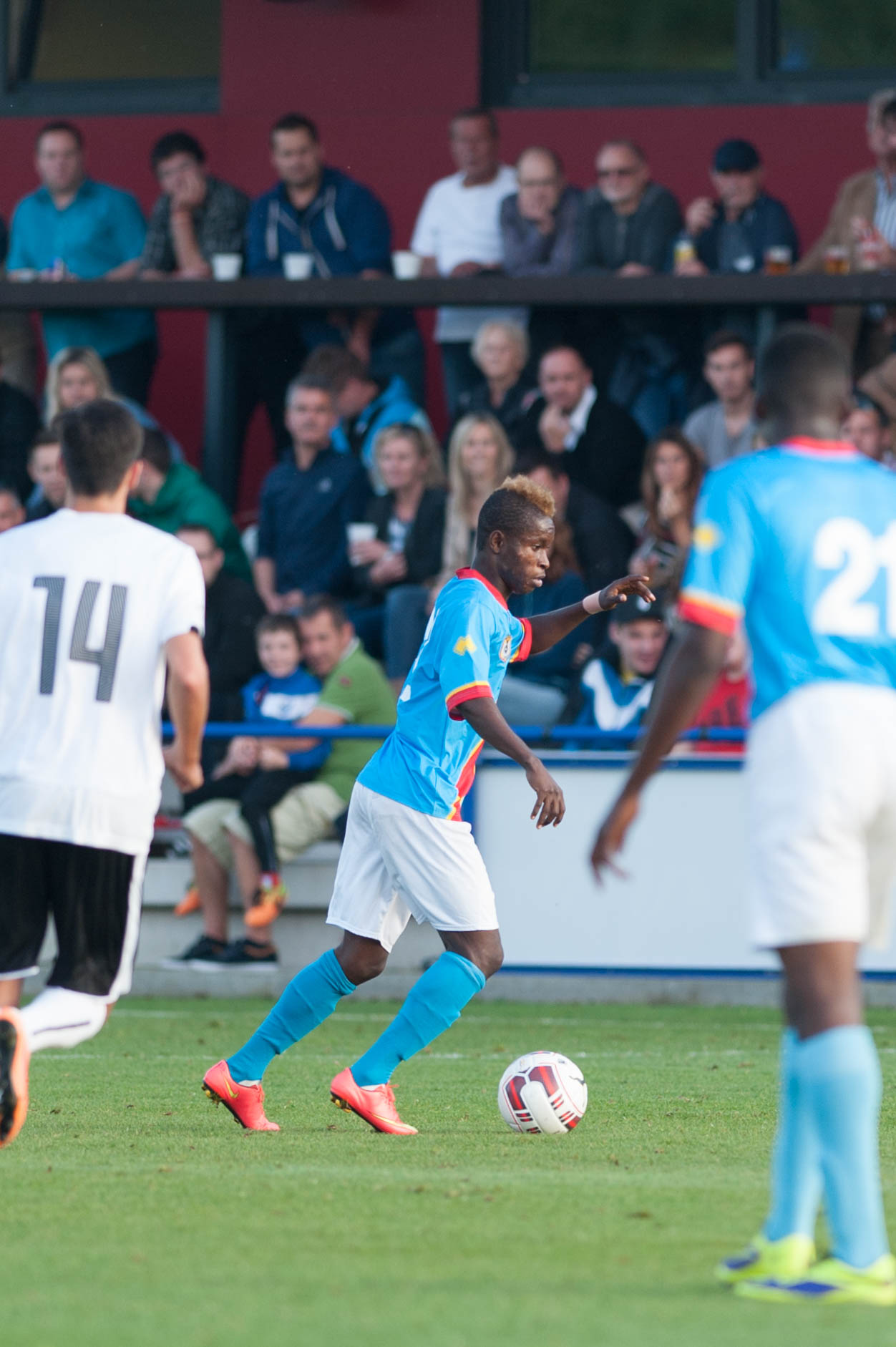
- Bukia, picture centre

Personal information
- Full name: André Watshini Bukia
- Date of birth: 3 March 1995 (age 31)
- Place of birth: Kinshasa, Zaire
- Height: 1.73 m (5 ft 8 in)
- Position: Right winger

Youth career
- 2011–2013: Braga
- 2009–2013: Penafiel

Senior career*
Years	Team	Apps	(Gls)
2014–2015	Vila Real	33	(4)
2015–2018	Boavista	22	(1)
2017–2018	→ Arouca (loan)	32	(6)
2018–2019	Arouca	31	(5)
2019	Kaisar	15	(1)
2020–2024	Arouca	78	(9)
2023	→ Al-Batin (loan)	16	(1)
2024	Espérance de Tunis	7	(0)
2025	Alverca	8	(1)
2025–2024	Al-Adalah	24	(2)

International career^{‡}
2014	DR Congo U21	1	(0)
2016–	DR Congo	1	(0)
- * Club domestic league appearances and goals as of 3 June 2025 ‡ National team caps and goals as of 25 June 2016

André Watshini Bukia (born 3 March 1995) is a Congolese professional footballer who plays as a right winger.

== Career ==
=== Club ===
On 12 July 2019, Bukia signed for FC Kaisar.

On 19 January 2023, Bukia joined Al-Batin on loan from Arouca.

On 31 January 2024, Bukia joined Tunisian club Espérance de Tunis.

=== International ===
Bukia is a youth international for the DR Congo national football team, and received a callup to the senior team for a friendly against Romania in May 2016.
