= Miguel Puche =

Spanish footballer

Personal information
- Full name: Miguel Puche García
- Date of birth: 30 April 2001 (age 25)
- Place of birth: Tarazona, Spain
- Height: 1.79 m (5 ft 10 in)
- Position: Winger

Team information
- Current team: Arouca
- Number: 11

Youth career
- Tudelano
- 2018–2020: Zaragoza

Senior career*
| Years | Team | Apps | (Gls) |
| 2017–2018 | Tudelano | 6 | (0) |
| 2020–2022 | Zaragoza B | 45 | (6) |
| 2021–2023 | Zaragoza | 50 | (2) |
| 2023– | Arouca | 72 | (3) |
- * Club domestic league appearances and goals as of 25 May 2026

Miguel Puche García (born 30 April 2001) is a Spanish footballer who plays as a winger for Portuguese club FC Arouca.

== Club career ==
Born in Tarazona, Zaragoza, Aragon, Puche played for CD Tudelano as a youth. On 8 October 2017, aged just 16, he made his first team debut by playing the last five minutes of a 1–0 Segunda División B home win against SD Leioa.

In the 2018 summer, after six appearances with the main squad, Puche moved to Real Zaragoza and returned to the youth setup. He was promoted to the reserves in the Tercera División in August 2020, and scored his first senior goal on 8 December by netting his team's fifth in a 6–0 home routing of CD Valdefierro.

Puche made his professional debut for Zaragoza on 13 August 2021, coming on as a late substitute for Iván Azón in a 0–0 home draw against UD Ibiza in the Segunda División. He scored his first professional goal on 11 March of the following year, netting the winner in a 2–1 home success over CF Fuenlabrada.

On 1 September 2022, Puche signed a professional contract until 2025, being definitely promoted to the main squad. On 6 August of the following year, he moved abroad for the first time in his career, signing a three-year deal with Portuguese Primeira Liga side FC Arouca.
