= Pedro Santos (footballer, born 2000) =

Portuguese footballer (born 2000)

Personal information
- Full name: Pedro Carvalho Santos
- Date of birth: 12 October 2000 (age 26)
- Place of birth: Porto, Portugal
- Height: 1.83 m (6 ft 0 in)
- Position: Midfielder

Team information
- Current team: Arouca
- Number: 89

Youth career
- 2009–2014: Porto
- 2014–2015: Feirense
- 2015–2016: Sanjoanense
- 2016–2018: Paços Ferreira
- 2018–2021: Braga

Senior career*
Years	Team	Apps	(Gls)
2021–2023	Braga B	51	(3)
2022–2023	Braga	3	(0)
2023–	Arouca	83	(1)
- * Club domestic league appearances and goals as of 22:33, 11 October 2026 (UTC)

Pedro Carvalho Santos (born 12 October 2000) is a Portuguese professional footballer who plays as a midfielder for Primeira Liga club Arouca.

== Club career ==
=== Braga ===
Born in Porto, Santos began his youth career at FC Porto and finished it at S.C. Braga. He made his competitive debut for the first team on 11 December 2022, in a 2–0 home win against F.C. Paços de Ferreira in the group stage of the Taça da Liga as an early substitute for the injured Jean-Baptiste Gorby. His first game in the Primeira Liga was on 21 January 2023, also from the bench in a 2–1 away victory over the same opposition; the previous day, he had signed a professional contract with the club until 2025.

Santos was named Breakthrough Player of the Season with the reserve side of Liga 3 in 2022–23.

=== Arouca ===
On 26 June 2023, Santos joined F.C. Arouca; no details of the deal were disclosed other than the fact that Braga kept 50% of his economic rights. He scored his first goal in the top division on 13 August, closing the 4–3 home defeat of G.D. Estoril Praia deep in injury time.

In October 2024, Santos agreed to an extension until June 2028. He made his 50th official appearance for Arouca on 20 December, in a 3–1 loss at Casa Pia AC.
