= Mateus Quaresma =

Brazilian footballer

Personal information
- Full name: Mateus Quaresma Correia
- Date of birth: 22 August 1996 (age 30)
- Place of birth: Bom Retiro do Sul, Brazil
- Height: 1.81 m (5 ft 11 in)
- Position: Left-back

Team information
- Current team: Avaí
- Number: 66

Senior career*
| Years | Team | Apps | (Gls) |
| 2015–2020 | Lajeadense | 11 | (0) |
| 2017 | → Londrina (loan) | 1 | (0) |
| 2018 | → Cuiabá (loan) | 0 | (0) |
| 2018–2019 | → America RJ (loan) | 6 | (0) |
| 2019–2020 | → Cascavel (loan) | 14 | (1) |
| 2020–2025 | Arouca | 90 | (1) |
| 2025– | Avaí | 18 | (0) |
- * Club domestic league appearances and goals as of 18 November 2026

Mateus Quaresma Correia (born 22 August 1996), sometimes known as just Quaresma, is a Brazilian professional footballer who plays as a left-back for Avaí.

== Career ==
Quaresma began his career with the Brazilian club Lajeadense, and followed that with successive loans with Londrina, Cuiabá, America RJ, and Cascavel. He made his professional debut with Lajeadense in a 1–1 Campeonato Gaúcho tie with Internacional on 1 February 2015. On 1 October 2020, Quaresma transferred to the Portuguese club Arouca.

== Honors ==
=== Clubs ===
Lajeadense

- Recopa Gaúcha: 2015

América-RJ

- Campeonato Carioca Série A2: 2018

Avaí

- Campeonato Catarinense: 2025
