= Thiago (footballer, born 1996) =

Brazilian footballer

Personal information
- Full name: Thiago Rodrigues da Silva
- Date of birth: 12 June 1996 (age 30)
- Place of birth: Rio de Janeiro, Brazil
- Height: 1.85 m (6 ft 1 in)
- Position: Goalkeeper

Youth career
- 2009–2016: Flamengo

Senior career*
Years	Team	Apps	(Gls)
2015–2020	Flamengo	11	(0)
2019	→ América Mineiro (loan)	4	(0)
2020	→ Estoril Praia (loan)	0	(0)
2020–2023	Estoril Praia	15	(0)
2023–2024	Arouca	3	(0)
2025	Torreense	4	(0)

International career
2011	Brazil U15		
2013	Brazil U17		
- * Club domestic league appearances and goals as of 4 June 2025

Thiago Rodrigues da Silva (born 12 June 1996), or simply Thiago, is a Brazilian footballer who plays as a goalkeeper.

== Career ==
=== Flamengo ===
Thiago made his professional debut for Flamengo in a Campeonato Carioca match against Portuguesa in March 2017.

Thiago played his first Brazilian Série A match against Avaí at Estádio da Ressacada on 11 June 2017 in a 1-1 draw.

On 4 January 2019, Atlético Goianiense announced that they had loaned Thiago for one year. But 16 days later, the deal was cancelled because of a divergence about a clause in the loan deal that demanded Thiago to play at least 60% of the club matches.

==== América (MG) (loan) ====
On 20 May 2019, he moved to América Mineiro, on loan until the end of 2019.

== Career statistics ==
As of 10 May 2021.

Appearances and goals by club, season and competition
Club	Season	League			Cup		Continental		Other		Total	
Club	Season	Division	Apps	Goals	Apps	Goals	Apps	Goals	Apps	Goals	Apps	Goals
Flamengo	2015	Série A	0	0	0	0	–		0	0	0	0
Flamengo	2016	Série A	0	0	0	0	0	0	0	0	0	0
Flamengo	2017	Série A	11	0	4	0	1 (Note: Appearance(s) in Copa Sudamericana.)	0	3 (Note: Appearance(s) in Campeonato Carioca.)	0	19	0
Flamengo	2018	Série A	0	0	0	0	0	0	0	0	0	0
Flamengo	Total		11	0	4	0	1	0	3	0	19	0
América Mineiro (loan)	2019	Série B	4	0	0	0	–		0	0	4	0
Estoril Praia (loan)	2019–20	LigaPro	0	0	0	0	–		–		0	0
Estoril Praia	2020–21	Liga Portugal 2	5	0	1 (Note: Appearance(s) in Taça da Liga.)	0	–		–		6	0
Total			20	0	5	0	1	0	3	0	29	0

== Honours ==
Flamengo

- Campeonato Carioca: 2017, 2019
- Copa Libertadores: 2019
- Campeonato Brasileiro: 2019

Estoril Praia

- Liga Portugal 2: 2020–21
