= Weverson (footballer, born 2000) =

Brazilian footballer

Personal information
- Full name: Weverson Moreira da Costa
- Date of birth: 5 July 2000 (age 26)
- Place of birth: Brasília, Brazil
- Height: 1.85 m (6 ft 1 in)
- Position: Left-back

Team information
- Current team: Gil Vicente
- Number: 26

Youth career
- 2013–2020: São Paulo

Senior career*
Years	Team	Apps	(Gls)
2020–2021	São Paulo	0	(0)
2020–2021	→ Red Bull Bragantino (loan)	20	(0)
2021–2022	Red Bull Bragantino	23	(0)
2023–2025	Arouca	56	(2)
2025–2026	Fortaleza	4	(0)
2026–	Gil Vicente	1	(0)

International career
2015–2017	Brazil U17	20	(1)
- * Club domestic league appearances and goals as of 25 May 2026

Weverson Moreira da Costa (born 5 July 2000), simply known as Weverson, is a Brazilian professional footballer who plays as a left-back for Primeira Liga club Gil Vicente.

== Club career ==
On 29 January 2026, Weverson signed a two-and-a-half-year contract with Primeira Liga club Gil Vicente.

== Career statistics ==
As of 13 December 2021

Club	Season	League			State league		Cup		Continental		Other		Total	
Club	Season	Division	Apps	Goals	Apps	Goals	Apps	Goals	Apps	Goals	Apps	Goals	Apps	Goals
Red Bull Bragantino	2020	Série A	15	0	5	0	0	0	—		—		20	0
Red Bull Bragantino	2021	Série A	17	0	3	0	1	0	0	0	—		21	0
Career total			32	0	8	0	1	0	0	0	0	0	41	0

== Honours ==
São Paulo

- Copa São Paulo de Futebol Jr.: 2019
