= Tiago Esgaio =

Portuguese footballer (born 1995)

Personal information
- Full name: Tiago Alexandre Sousa Esgaio
- Date of birth: 1 August 1995 (age 31)
- Place of birth: Nazaré, Portugal
- Height: 1.75 m (5 ft 9 in)
- Position: Right-back

Team information
- Current team: Arouca
- Number: 28

Youth career
- 2003–2009: Nazarenos
- 2009–2013: União Leiria
- 2013–2014: Rio Ave

Senior career*
Years	Team	Apps	(Gls)
2014–2016	Caldas	61	(7)
2016–2018	Torreense	62	(10)
2018–2021	B-SAD	60	(3)
2018–2019	→ Torreense (loan)	23	(3)
2021–2024	Braga	1	(0)
2021–2024	→ Arouca (loan)	73	(2)
2024–	Arouca	64	(6)
- * Club domestic league appearances and goals as of 17:23, 1 November 2026 (UTC)

Tiago Alexandre Sousa Esgaio (born 1 August 1995) is a Portuguese professional footballer who plays as a right-back for Primeira Liga club Arouca, where he is captain.

== Club career ==
=== B-SAD ===
Born in Nazaré, Leiria District, played youth football for three clubs. He made his senior debut in the third division, spending one season apiece with Caldas S.C. and S.C.U. Torreense.

On 4 April 2018, Esgaio moved straight to the Primeira Liga after signing a three-year contract with B-SAD to be made effective on 1 July. He was then loaned to Torreense for the upcoming third-tier campaign.

Back at Belenenses, Esgaio played his first match in the Portuguese top flight on 15 September 2019, coming on as a late substitute in a 3–1 away win against C.S. Marítimo. He scored his first goal in the competition two weeks later, but in a 3–1 loss at F.C. Famalicão.

=== Braga and Arouca ===
On 23 June 2021, Esgaio joined S.C. Braga on a four-year deal. Two months later, he was loaned to F.C. Arouca also of the top tier for the season; the move was extended for 2022–23. He scored his first goal for the latter club on 22 December 2022, equalising an eventual 2–1 away victory over Moreirense F.C. in the quarter-finals of the Taça da Liga.

In June 2023, Esgaio was loaned to Arouca for another year. In summer 2024, he was released by Braga and signed a permanent three-year contract for a €200,000 fee.

== Personal life ==
Esgaio's older brother, Ricardo, is also a footballer and a right-back.
