= Beni Mukendi =

Angolan association football player

Personal information
- Full name: Benedito Mambuene Mukendi
- Date of birth: 21 May 2002 (age 24)
- Place of birth: Luanda, Angola
- Height: 1.80 m (5 ft 11 in)
- Position: Midfielder

Team information
- Current team: Vitória
- Number: 16

Youth career
- Petro de Luanda

Senior career*
Years	Team	Apps	(Gls)
2020–2023	Trofense	49	(0)
2023–2025	Casa Pia	52	(0)
2025–	Vitória	36	(1)

International career^{‡}
2019	Angola U17	9	(0)
2023–	Angola	3	(0)
- * Club domestic league appearances and goals as of 25 May 2026 ‡ National team caps and goals as of 27 March 2025

Benedito "Beni" Mambuene Mukendi (born 21 May 2002) is an Angolan footballer who plays as a midfielder for Vitória and the Angola national team.

== Club career ==
A youth product of the Angolan club Petro de Luanda, Beni moved to Trofense in the fall of 2020. In his debut season, he helped the club win the 2020–21 and earn promotion to the Liga Portugal 2. After 2.5 seasons with Trofense and 49 appearances, he transferred to Primeira Liga side Casa Pia. On 30 January 2023 on a 4-year contract. On 10 January 2026, Beni played in the Portuguese Taça da Liga final against Braga in which Vitória Guimarães won 2–1.

== International career ==
Mukendi played for the Angola U17s at the 2019 FIFA U-17 World Cup. He was called up to the senior Angola national team for the first time in March 2022.

On 3 December 2025, Mukendi was called up to the Angola squad for the 2025 Africa Cup of Nations.

== Honours ==
Trofense

- Campeonato de Portugal: 2020–21

Vitória SC

- Taça da Liga: 2025–26
