= Estádio Municipal de Arouca =

Football stadium in Arouca, Portugal

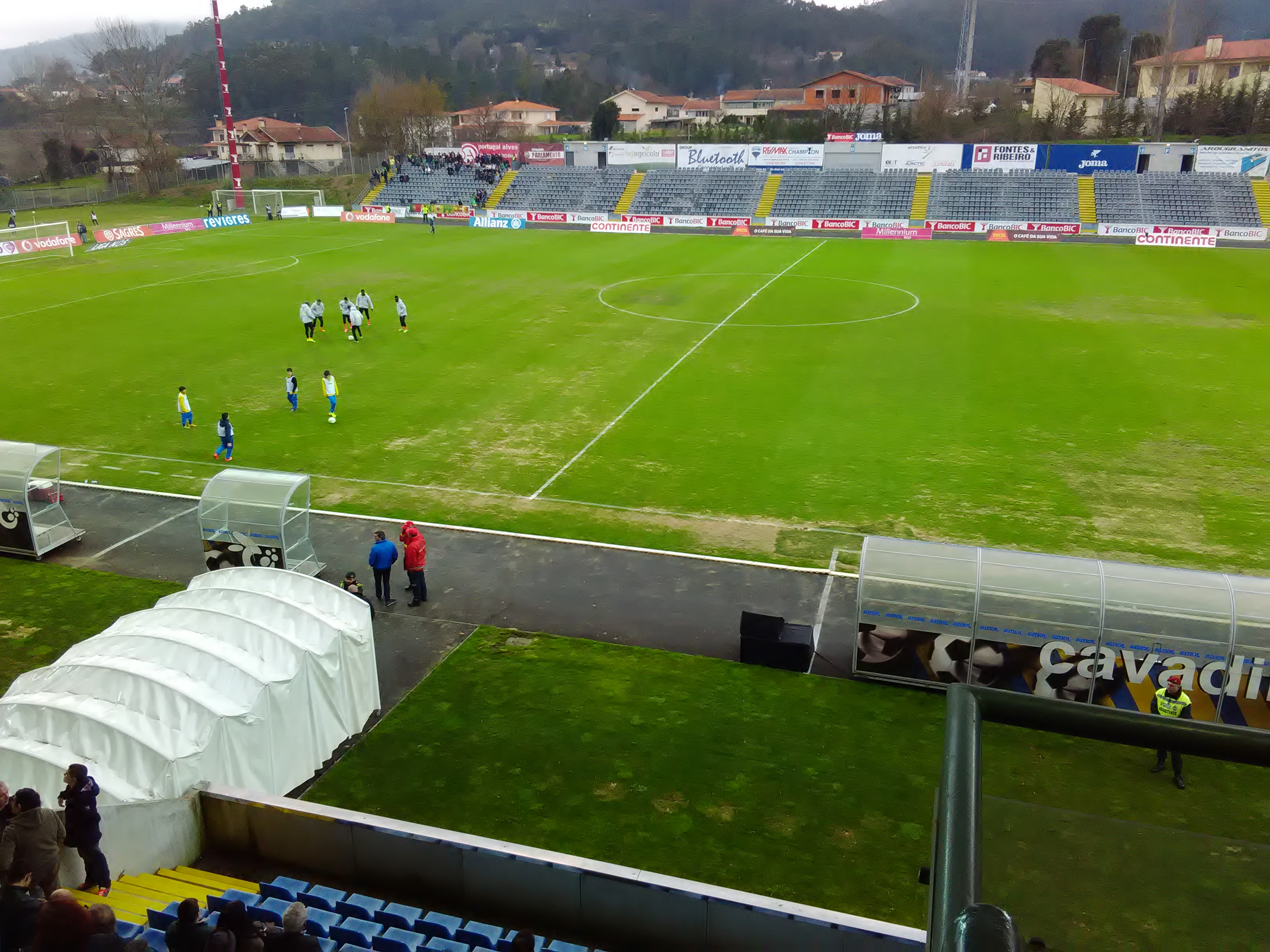
- Interactive map of Estádio Municipal de Arouca
- Location: Arouca, Portugal
- Coordinates: 40.9330°N 8.2503°W
- Owner: Municipality of Arouca
- Operator: F.C. Arouca
- Capacity: 5,600
- Surface: Grass
- Field size: 105 × 68 m

Construction
- Opened: 2006
- Expanded: 2013
- Main contractors: Construções Carlos Pinho, Lda.

Tenant
- F.C. Arouca

The Estádio Municipal de Arouca is an association football stadium located in Arouca, Portugal, which is used by F.C. Arouca as their home ground.

Owned by the local municipality, it was built in 2006 while Arouca were still playing in the Aveiro regional leagues. Major renovation and expansion were completed in July 2013, in time for Arouca's debut on the top-tier Primeira Liga.
