= F.C. Arouca =

Coordinates: 40°55′58.350″N 8°15′1.246″W

Arouca
- Full name: Futebol Clube de Arouca
- Nicknames: Arouquenses, Lobos (Wolves)
- Founded: 25 December 1951; 74 years ago
- Ground: Estádio Municipal de Arouca
- Capacity: 5,600
- President: Carlos Pinho
- Head coach: Vítor Severino
- League: Primeira Liga
- 2025–26: Primeira Liga, 8th of 18
- Website: fcarouca.eu
Home colours	Away colours	Third colours

Futebol Clube de Arouca (pronounced [ɐˈɾokɐ]) is a professional football club based in Arouca, in the Porto metropolitan area. Founded in 1951, the club plays in the Primeira Liga, holding home games at Estádio Municipal de Arouca, with a 5,600-seat capacity.

== History ==
Founded on 25 December 1951, as a FC Porto subsidiary, Arouca spent the first five decades of its existence in the Aveiro regional leagues. In only two years (2006–08) it managed to reach the third division, being managed by television (RTP) presenter Jorge Gabriel for a few months during that timeframe.

Arouca managed its fourth promotion in only seven years at the end of 2012–13, reaching the Primeira Liga for the first time in its history. Subsequently, the Arouca Municipality awarded the club the Medal of Gold Merit for its achievement, with the organization also being granted extra financial means to renovate and expand its stadium.

In 2015–16 under Lito Vidigal, Arouca finished a best-ever fifth place, qualifying for the first time to the UEFA Europa League. After beating Heracles Almelo of the Netherlands on the away goals rule, they lost the play-off 3–1 after extra time to Olympiacos of Greece. A year after their peak finish, Arouca were relegated, ending their four years at the top.

A two-year spell in the second division for Arouca ended in May 2019 when on the last day of the season, they lost to U.D. Oliveirense and Varzim S.C. defeated Académica de Coimbra; this ended nine years in the professional leagues. The 2019–20 season was truncated due to the COVID-19 pandemic and Arouca and Vizela were due to be promoted because of their final position; competitors Olhanense successfully appealed at the Court of Arbitration for Sport for these promotions to be suspended.

== Players ==
=== Current squad ===
As of 5 September 2026

Note: Flags indicate national team as defined under FIFA eligibility rules; some limited exceptions apply. Players may hold more than one non-FIFA nationality.

No.	Pos.	Nation	Player
1	GK	SVK	Jakub Vinarčík
2	DF	ENG	Leo Shahar (on loan from Newcastle)
3	DF	ESP	José Fontán
4	DF	POR	Diogo Monteiro
5	DF	SRB	Boris Popović
6	MF	NED	Espen van Ee
7	MF	FRA	Naïs Djouahra
8	MF	JPN	Taichi Fukui
9	FW	FRA	Fally Mayulu
10	MF	ESP	Pablo Gozálbez
11	FW	ESP	Miguel Puche
12	GK	URU	Ignacio de Arruabarrena
14	MF	KOR	Lee Hyun-ju

No.	Pos.	Nation	Player
15	DF	ESP	Javi Sánchez
17	FW	ESP	Iván Barbero
18	DF	UKR	Orest Lebedenko
19	FW	URU	Alfonso Trezza
20	MF	CRO	Gabriel Rukavina
21	MF	ESP	Mateo Flores
23	FW	URU	Dylan Nandín
24	FW	URU	Brian Mansilla
28	DF	POR	Tiago Esgaio (captain)
37	DF	ESP	Mario Climent
71	GK	POR	Martim Duarte
77	FW	KOR	Park Si-hoo
89	MF	POR	Pedro Santos

=== Out on loan ===
Note: Flags indicate national team as defined under FIFA eligibility rules; some limited exceptions apply. Players may hold more than one non-FIFA nationality.

No. / Pos. / Nation / Player; — / DF / ESP / Arnau Solà (at Atlético Madrileño until 30 June 2027)	No. / Pos. / Nation / Player; — / FW / LTU / Romualdas Jansonas (at UD Ourense until 30 June 2027)

== Statistics ==
=== Most appearances ===
As of 11 June 2026

Rank	Player	Appearances	Goals
1	(Portugal) David Simão	222	14
2	(Democratic Republic of the Congo) André Bukia	175	24
3	(Portugal) Nuno Coelho	174	11
4	(Portugal) Tiago Esgaio	148	8
5	(Brazil) João Basso	136	19
6	(Brazil) Thales Oleques	133	7
7	(Portugal) Hélder Silva	130	16
8	(Portugal) Roberto	124	32
9	(Brazil) Adílio Santos	117	24
10	(Guinea) Morlaye Sylla	114	10

=== Top goalscorers ===
As of 23 January 2025

Rank	Player	Appearances	Goals
1	(Brazil) Joeano	68	46
2	(Spain) Rafa Mújica	68	37
3	(Portugal) Roberto	124	32
4	(Portugal) Fábio Fortes	62	27
5	(Brazil) Adílio Santos	117	24
5	(Democratic Republic of the Congo) André Bukia	175	24
7	(Brazil) André Silva	80	21
8	(Brazil) João Basso	136	19
9	(Spain) Cristo González	44	18
10	(Uruguay) Alfonso Trezza	98	16
10	(Portugal) Hélder Silva	130	16

== Managerial history ==
- (Portugal) Acácio Figueiredo (2000–2001)
- (Portugal) Francisco Batista (2001–2002)
- (Portugal) Artur Quaresma (2003 – June 2004)
- (Portugal) Vasco Coelho (1 July 2004 – 1 November 2004)
- (Portugal) Rui Correia (1 July 2006 – 30 June 2007)
- (Portugal) Jorge Gabriel (1 July 2007 – 4 February 2008)
- (Portugal) José Pedro (4 February 2008 – 30 June 2009)
- (Portugal) Carlos Secretário (1 July 2009 – 7 December 2009)
- (Portugal) Henrique Nunes (9 December 2009 – 20 September 2011)
- (Portugal) Vítor Oliveira (21 September 2011 – 30 June 2013)
- (Portugal) Pedro Emanuel (1 July 2013 – 25 May 2015)
- (Angola) Lito Vidigal (1 July 2015 – 11 February 2017)
- (Portugal) Manuel Machado (11 February 2017 – 21 March 2017)
- (Portugal) Jorge Leitão (22 March 2017 – 30 June 2017)
- (Portugal) Jorge Costa (1 July 2017 – 14 September 2017)
- (Portugal) Miguel Leal (15 September 2017 – 26 September 2018)
- (Portugal) Quim Machado (27 September 2018 – 30 June 2019)
- (Portugal) Henrique Nunes (1 July 2019 – 30 June 2020)
- (Portugal) Armando Evangelista (1 July 2020 – 11 June 2023)
- (Portugal) Daniel Ramos (1 July 2023 – 15 November 2023)
- (Portugal) Daniel Sousa (15 November 2023 – 19 May 2024)
- (Uruguay) Gonzalo García (21 May 2024 – 28 October 2024)
- (Portugal) Vasco Seabra (29 October 2024 – 30 September 2026)
- (Portugal) Vítor Severino (4 October 2026 – present)

== Honours ==
- Segunda Divisão
  - 2009–10
- Terceira Divisão
  - 2007–08
- Aveiro Regional League
  - 2006–07, 2002–03

== Seasons ==
Season	Tier	Domestic League										Cup	Other Cups		Europe / Other		Top goalscorer(s) (Note: Goals in all competitions (Liga Portuguesa, Taça de Portugal, League Cup, County FA leagues and cups, and European) are counted.)	
Season	Tier	League	Division	P	W	D	L	F	A	Pts	Pos	Cup	Other Cups		Europe / Other		Name	Goals
1985–86	4	Aveiro I	Norte	33	8	9	16	29	54	58	16th	—	Aveiro Cup					
1986–87	5	Aveiro II	Norte	26	20	5	1	78	10	71	1st	—	Aveiro Cup					
1987–88	?											—	Aveiro Cup					
1988–89	?											—	Aveiro Cup					
1989–90	?											—	Aveiro Cup					
1990–91	?											—	Aveiro Cup					
1991–92	?											—	Aveiro Cup					
1992–93	?											—	Aveiro Cup					
1993–94	?											—	Aveiro Cup					
1994–95	?											—	Aveiro Cup					
1995–96	?											—	Aveiro Cup					
1996–97	5	Aveiro I	A	30	4	2	24	17	55	14	15th	—	Aveiro Cup					
1997–98	6	Aveiro I B	Norte	30						79	1st	—	Aveiro Cup					
1998–99	5	Aveiro I	A	30	13	5	12	32	37	44	5th	—	Aveiro Cup					
1999–00	5	Aveiro I	A	30							11th	—	Aveiro Cup					
2000–01	5	Aveiro I	A	30	18	8	4	44	18	62	1st	—	Aveiro Cup					
2000–01	5	Aveiro I	Play-Off	6	3	2	1	10	10	11	2nd	—	Aveiro Cup					
2001–02	4	III Divisão	C	34	11	6	17	44	60	39	15th	R1	—					
2002–03	5	Aveiro I		38						89	1st	—	Aveiro Cup					
2003–04	4	III Divisão	C	34	11	7	16	41	46	40	15th	R2	—					
2004–05	5	Aveiro I		38	21	12	5	54	29	75	3rd	—	Aveiro Cup					
2005–06	5	Aveiro I		38	19	8	11	68	42	65	5th	—	Aveiro Cup					
2006–07	5	Aveiro I		34	25	6	3	67	18	81	1st	—	Aveiro Cup					
2007–08	4	III Divisão	C	36	21	9	6	59	26	48	1st	R2	—					
2007–08	4	III Divisão	Play-Off	Cancelled due to financial constraints							Shared	R2	—					
2008–09	3	II Divisão	B	22	9	2	11	26	23	29	7th	R4	—					
2008–09	3	II Divisão	Play-Out	10	5	1	4	12	13	31	7th	R4	—					
2009–10	3	II Divisão	Centro	30	17	6	7	41	23	57	1st	R2	—					
2009–10	3	II Divisão	Play-Off	4	2	0	2	4	5	6	1st	R2	—					
2010–11	2	II Liga		30	11	10	9	47	41	57	5th	R3	League Cup	R3			N'Jock; Kiko	12
2011–12	2	II Liga		30	7	13	10	32	36	34	13th	R2	League Cup	R1			Joeano	19
2012–13	2	II Liga		42	21	10	11	65	48	73	2nd	QF	League Cup	R1			Joeano	27
2013–14	1	I Liga		30	8	7	15	28	42	31	12th	R5	League Cup	R2			Roberto	9
2014–15	1	I Liga		34	7	7	20	26	50	28	16th	R3	League Cup	R3			Roberto	6
2015–16	1	I Liga		34	13	15	6	47	38	54	5th	QF	League Cup	R3			Walter González	7
2016–17	1	I Liga		34	9	5	20	33	57	32	17th	R3	League Cup	R3	EL	PO	Kuca	8
2017–18	2	II Liga		38	16	11	11	42	37	59	6th	R4	League Cup	R2			Roberto Rodrigo	11
2018–19	2	II Liga		34	10	10	13	40	45	40	16th	R4	League Cup	R2			Fábio Fortes	9
2019–20	3	C. Portugal.	D	25	18	4	3	49	19	58	1st (Note: Campeonato de Portugal suspended due to COVID-19 pandemic in Portugal)	R4					Fábio Fortes	18
2020–21	2	II Liga		34	20	10	4	55	26	70	3rd	R3					André Silva	7
2020–21	2	Play-off		2	2	0	0	5	0		1st (Note: Beat Rio Ave in the play-off and was promoted to I Liga)	R3					André Silva	7
2021–22	1	I Liga		34	7	10	17	30	54	31	15th	R3	League Cup	R2			André Silva	10
2022–23	1	I Liga		34	15	9	10	36	37	54	5th	R5	League Cup	SF			Rafa Mújica	14
2023–24	1	I Liga		34									League Cup	R3	ECL	PO		

Champions	Runners-up	Qualified for the Europa League	Qualified for the Europa Conference League	Promoted	Qualified for Play-Off	Relegated

Last updated: 10 November 2023

Key	Meaning	Key	Meaning
P	Played	QR	Qualifying Round
W	Games won	GS	Group Stage
D	Games drawn	R	Round
L	Games lost	QF	Quarter-Finals
GF	Goals for	SF	Semi-Finals
GA	Goals against	RU	Runner Up
Pts	Points	W	Winner
Pos	Final position	?	No information

== European record ==
=== UEFA club competition record ===
Season	Competition	Round	Club	Home	Away	Aggregate
2016–17	UEFA Europa League	3Q	(Netherlands) Heracles Almelo	0–0	1–1	1–1 (a)
2016–17	UEFA Europa League	PO	(Greece) Olympiacos	0–1	1–2 (a.e.t.)	1–3
2023–24	UEFA Europa Conference League	3Q	(Norway) Brann	2–1	1–3	3–4

Notes

- 3Q: Third qualifying round
- PO: Play-off

=== UEFA coefficient ===
Correct as of 21 May 2025.

Rank	Team	Points
127	(Belgium) Cercle Brugge K.S.V.	12.750
128	(Finland) HJK Helsinki	12.500
129	(Portugal) F.C. Arouca	12.453
130	(Portugal) Gil Vicente F.C.	12.453
131	(Portugal) C.D. Santa Clara	12.453
