= 2023–24 F.C. Famalicão season =

F.C. Famalicão
2023–24 season
- Manager: João Pedro Sousa
- Stadium: Estádio Municipal 22 de Junho
- Primeira Liga: 8th
- Taça de Portugal: Fourth round
- Taça da Liga: First round
- Top goalscorer: League: Jhonder Cádiz (15); All: Jhonder Cádiz (16)
- Biggest win: AD Camacha 0–5 Famalicão
- Biggest defeat: Famalicão 0–3 Porto
Home colours	Away colours	Third colours

The 2023–24 season was F.C. Famalicão's 93rd season in existence and fifth consecutive in the Primeira Liga. They are also competing in the Taça de Portugal and Taça da Liga.

== Players ==
=== First-team squad ===
As of 26 September 2023

Note: Flags indicate national team as defined under FIFA eligibility rules; some limited exceptions apply. Players may hold more than one non-FIFA nationality.

No.	Pos.	Nation	Player
1	GK	RUS	Ivan Zlobin
4	DF	ALB	Enea Mihaj
5	DF	POR	Rúben Lima
6	MF	FRA	Tom Lacoux (on loan from Bordeaux)
7	FW	PAN	Puma Rodríguez
8	MF	SRB	Mirko Topić
9	FW	POR	Henrique Araújo (on loan from Benfica)
10	MF	POR	Chiquinho (on loan from Wolverhampton Wanderers)
11	FW	ESP	Óscar Aranda
12	MF	BRA	Gustavo Assunção
13	DF	BRA	Otávio
15	DF	BRA	Riccieli (captain)
16	DF	NED	Justin de Haas
17	FW	POR	Afonso Rodrigues

No.	Pos.	Nation	Player
18	MF	FIN	Otso Liimatta
20	MF	POR	Gustavo Sá
22	DF	BRA	Nathan (on loan from Santos)
23	FW	ROU	Alex Dobre
28	MF	COM	Zaydou Youssouf
29	FW	VEN	Jhonder Cádiz
31	GK	BRA	Luiz Júnior
32	DF	ESP	Martín Aguirregabiria
51	GK	BRA	Zé Henrique
70	MF	POR	Martim Almeida
74	DF	POR	Francisco Moura
77	FW	POR	Pablo
90	GK	POR	Hugo Cunha
95	FW	POR	Théo Fonseca

=== Other players under contract ===
Note: Flags indicate national team as defined under FIFA eligibility rules; some limited exceptions apply. Players may hold more than one non-FIFA nationality.

No.	Pos.	Nation	Player
—	DF	ESP	Dani Morer
—	MF	BRA	João Neto

No.	Pos.	Nation	Player
—	MF	JPN	Toki Yukutomo (on loan from Ehime)

=== Out on loan ===
Note: Flags indicate national team as defined under FIFA eligibility rules; some limited exceptions apply. Players may hold more than one non-FIFA nationality.

No.	Pos.	Nation	Player
—	DF	ARG	Hernán de la Fuente (at Atlético Tucumán until 31 December 2023)
—	MF	POR	André Simões (at Leixões until 30 June 2024)
—	MF	POR	David Tavares (at Torreense until 30 June 2024)

== Transfers ==
=== In ===
Pos.	Player	Transferred from	Fee	Date	Source
MF	(Serbia) Mirko Topić	(Serbia) Vojvodina	€1,000,000	1 July 2023	
DF	(Portugal) Francisco Moura	(Portugal) Braga	€1,000,000	18 July 2023	
FW	(Portugal) Henrique Araújo	(Portugal) Benfica	Loan	18 July 2023	
MF	(Portugal) Chiquinho	(England) Wolverhampton Wanderers	Loan	1 September 2023	

=== Out ===
Pos.	Player	Transferred to	Fee	Date	Source
DF	(Portugal) Alexandre Penetra	(Netherlands) AZ Alkmaar	€4,200,000	24 July 2023	
MF	(Portugal) Iván Jaime	(Portugal) Porto	€10,000,000	31 August 2023	

== Pre-season and friendlies ==
Win Draw Loss Fixtures

15 July 2023 Friendly	Famalicão (Portugal)	1–0	(Portugal) Trofense
17:00

4 August 2023 Friendly	Chaves (Portugal)	0–1	(Portugal) Famalicão

== Competitions ==
=== Overall record ===
Competition	First match	Last match	Starting round	Final position	Record							
Competition	First match	Last match	Starting round	Final position	Pld	W	D	L	GF	GA	GD	Win %
Primeira Liga	16 August 2023	19 May 2024	Matchday 1		13	4	5	4	12	14	−2	30.77
Taça de Portugal	25 November 2023	25 November 2023	Third round	Fourth round	2	1	0	1	5	2	+3	50.00
Taça da Liga	23 July 2023		First round	First round	1	0	0	1	2	3	−1	0.00
Total					16	5	5	6	19	19	+0	31.25

Last updated: 9 December 2023
Source: Soccerway

=== Primeira Liga ===
==== League table ====
Pos	Team	Pld	W	D	L	GF	GA	GD	Pts
6	Moreirense	34	16	7	11	36	35	+1	55
7	Arouca	34	13	7	14	54	50	+4	46
8	Famalicão	34	10	12	12	37	41	−4	42
9	Casa Pia	34	10	8	16	38	50	−12	38
10	Farense	34	10	7	17	46	51	−5	37 (Note: Head-to-head points: Farense 4, Rio Ave 1.)

Source: Liga Portugal
Rules for classification: 1) Points; 2) Head-to-head points; 3) Head-to-head goal difference; 4) Head-to-head away goals scored; 5) Goal difference; 6) Matches won; 7) Goals scored; 8) Play-off.

==== Results summary ====
Overall								Home						Away					
Pld	W	D	L	GF	GA	GD	Pts	W	D	L	GF	GA	GD	W	D	L	GF	GA	GD
34	10	12	12	37	41	−4	42	6	6	5	21	21	0	4	6	7	16	20	−4

Last updated: 17 May 2024.
Source: Superliga

==== Results by round ====
Round	1	2	3	4	5	6	7	8	9	10	11	12	13	14	15	16	17	18	19	20	21	22	23	24	25	26	27	28	29	30	31	32	33	34
Ground	A	H	A	H	A	H	A	H	A	H	A	H	A	H	A	H	A	H	A	H	A	H	A	H	A	H	A	H	A	H	A	H	A	H
Result	W	D	L	W	D	W	D	L	L	W	D	L	D	D	L	D	W	L	L	L	D	W	L	D	L	D	W	W	D	D	L	W	W	L
Position	7	6	9	7	7	5	7	7	8	8	8	8	8	8	8	9	7	8	10	10	10	9	10	9	10	9	8	8	8	8	8	8	8	8

Updated to match(es) played on 17 May 2024. Source: Liga Portugal Betclic
A = Away; H = Home; W = Win; D = Draw; L = Loss

==== Matches ====
The league fixtures were unveiled on 5 July 2023.

11 August 2023 1	Braga	1–2	Famalicão	Braga
20:15 WET	Ricardo Horta 9'; Borja (yellow card) 83'; Zalazar (yellow card) 83'; Álvaro Djaló (yellow card) 90+5'; Saatçı (yellow card) 90+8'	Report	Youssouf (yellow card) 7'; Afonso Rodrigues 67'; Gustavo Assunção (yellow card) 73'; Luiz Júnior (yellow card) 81'; Cádiz (yellow card) 88'; Óscar Aranda 90+5'	Stadium: Estádio Municipal de Braga; Attendance: 19,184; Referee: (Portugal) Fábio Veríssimo

21 August 2023 2	Famalicão	0–0	Moreirense	Vila Nova de Famalicão
20:15 WET	Pablo (yellow card) 21' (yellow-red card) 45+5'; Henrique Araújo (yellow card) 30'; Topić (yellow card) 87'	Report	Gonçalo Franco (yellow card) 23'; Pedro Aparício (yellow card) 76'; Ofori (yellow card) 83'	Stadium: Estádio Municipal 22 de Junho; Attendance: 4,640; Referee: (Portugal) António Nobre

27 August 2023 3	Sporting CP	1–0	Famalicão	Lisbon
20:30 WET	Gyökeres (yellow card) 23'; Coates (yellow card) 45+1'; Paulinho 52'; Morita (yellow card) 90+2'	Report	Riccieli (yellow card) 31'; Topić (yellow card) 68'	Stadium: Estádio José Alvalade; Attendance: 40,287; Referee: (Portugal) André Narciso

2 September 2023 4	Famalicão	1–0	Farense	Vila Nova de Famalicão
18:00 WET	Óscar Aranda (yellow card) 20'; Cádiz 79'	Report	Mattheus Oliveira (yellow card) 24'; Claudio Falcão (yellow card) 37'; Marco Matias (yellow card) 54'; Muscat (red card) 64'	Stadium: Estádio Municipal 22 de Junho; Attendance: 4,171; Referee: (Portugal) Iancu Vasilica

16 September 2023 5	Rio Ave	1–1	Famalicão	Vila do Conde
15:30 WET	Topić 49' (o.g.); Oudrhiri (yellow card) 64'	Report	Cádiz 11'; Youssouf (yellow card) 26'; Topić (yellow card) 54'; Riccieli (yellow card) 64'	Stadium: Estádio dos Arcos; Attendance: 3,075; Referee: (Portugal) Bruno Pires Costa

22 September 2023 6	Famalicão	1–0	Arouca	Vila Nova de Famalicão
20:15 WET	Otávio (yellow card) 16' (goal) 28'; Riccieli (yellow card) 39' (yellow-red card) 57'; Óscar Aranda (yellow card) 45+1'; Martín Aguirregabiria (yellow card) 51'	Report	Jason (yellow card) 20'; Galović (yellow card) 64'; Rafa Mújica (red card) 77'	Stadium: Estádio Municipal 22 de Junho; Attendance: 3,678; Referee: (Portugal) Bruno Vieira

30 September 2023 7	Boavista	2–2	Famalicão	Porto
18:00 WET	Tiago Morais (yellow card) 25' (yellow-red card) 79'; Makouta (yellow card) 43'; Miguel Reisinho 44'; Abascal (yellow card) 53'; Salvador Agra 68'; Vukotić (yellow card) 74'	Report	Cádiz 12' (pen.) (red card) 69'; Lacoux (yellow card) 37'; Martín Aguirregabiria (yellow card) 45+2'; Afonso Rodrigues (yellow card) 65'; Francisco Moura (yellow card) 67'; Chiquinho (red card) 71'; de Haas 90+2'	Stadium: Estádio do Bessa; Attendance: 7,809; Referee: (Portugal) Gustavo Correia

8 October 2023 8	Famalicão	1–3	Vitória de Guimarães	Vila Nova de Famalicão
15:30 WET	Francisco Moura (yellow card) 11'; Otávio 63'; Youssouf (yellow card) 71'; Gustavo Assunção (yellow card) 81'; Nathan Santos (yellow card) 84'	Report	João Mendes 1' 45+4'; Jota Silva (yellow card) 37'; Afonso Freitas (yellow card) 48'; Bruno Gaspar 77'; Tiago Silva (yellow card) 81'	Stadium: Estádio Municipal 22 de Junho; Attendance: 4,278; Referee: (Portugal) Artur Soares Dias

29 October 2023 9	Estrela	1–0	Famalicão	Amadora
18:00 WET	Mansur (yellow card) 17'; Kialonda Gaspar (yellow card) 25'; Miguel Lopes (yellow card) 68'; André Luiz 74'	Report	Nathan Santos (yellow card) 7'; Riccieli (red card) 33'; Chiquinho (yellow card) 54'; Otávio (yellow card) 83'	Stadium: Estádio José Gomes; Attendance: 3,137; Referee: (Portugal) Carlos Macedo

4 November 2023 10	Famalicão	3–1	Gil Vicente	Vila Nova de Famalicão
18:00 WET	Gustavo Sá 36' (yellow card) 82'; Francisco Moura 44'; Chiquinho (yellow card) 46' (goal) 60'; Nathan Santos (yellow card) 84'	Report	Zé Carlos (yellow card) 3'; Murilo Costa (yellow card) 14'; Dominguez 67'; Martim Neto (yellow card) 72'	Stadium: Estádio Municipal 22 de Junho; Attendance: 2,239; Referee: (Portugal) José Bessa

11 November 2023 11	Vizela	0–0	Famalicão	Vizela
18:00 WET	Samu (yellow card) 52'	Report	Topić (yellow card) 58'; Gustavo Assunção (yellow card) 88'; Francisco Moura (yellow card) 90+4'	Stadium: Estádio do Futebol Clube de Vizela; Attendance: 2,235; Referee: (Portugal) Bruno Pires Costa

2 December 2023 12	Famalicão	0–3	Porto	Vila Nova de Famalicão
18:00 WET	Youssouf (yellow card) 29' (yellow-red card) 80'; Martín Aguirregabiria (yellow card) 77'; Chiquinho (yellow card) 90+1'	Report	Evanilson 8'; Fábio Cardoso (yellow card) 34'; Taremi 45+4'; Eustáquio (yellow card) 50'; Francisco Conceição (yellow card) 80' (goal) 87'; Sánchez (yellow card) 90'; Grujić (yellow card) 90+4'	Stadium: Estádio Municipal 22 de Junho; Attendance: 4,858; Referee: (Portugal) António Nobre

9 December 2023 13	Portimonense	1–1	Famalicão	Portimão
15:30 WET	Filipe Relvas (yellow card) 28'; Guga (yellow card) 47'; Alemão (yellow card) 57'; Hélio Varela 61'; Carrillo (red card) 73'; Luan (yellow card) 90+9'	Report	Théo Fonseca 31'; Gustavo Assunção (yellow card) 39'	Stadium: Estádio Municipal de Portimão; Attendance: 1,188; Referee: (Portugal) Hélder Carvalho

17 December 2023 14	Famalicão	1–1	Estoril	Vila Nova de Famalicão
18:00 WET	Francisco Moura (yellow card) 2'; Cádiz 14' (yellow card) 74'; Mihaj (yellow card) 68'; Pablo (yellow card) 85'	Report	Cassiano 5'; Tiago Araújo (yellow card) 88'	Stadium: Estádio Municipal 22 de Junho; Attendance: 3,599; Referee: (Portugal) Miguel Nogueira

29 December 2023 15	Benfica	3–0	Famalicão	Lisbon
18:45 WET	Arthur Cabral 31'; Kökçü (yellow card) 62'; Musa (yellow card) 80' (goal) 89'; Rafa Silva 85'	Report	Chiquinho (yellow card) 37'; Otávio (yellow card) 61'; Gustavo Assunção (yellow card) 90+2'	Stadium: Estádio da Luz; Attendance: 58,725; Referee: (Portugal) André Narciso

7 January 2024 16	Famalicão	2–2	Chaves	Vila Nova de Famalicão
20:30 WET	Cádiz (yellow card) 29'; Théo Fonseca 33'; Chiquinho 40'; Gustavo Sá (yellow card) 43'; Nathan Santos (yellow card) 45'	Report	Héctor Hernández 23' (pen.); Phete (yellow card) 39'; Bruno Rodrigues (yellow card) 51'; Rúben Ribeiro 56'	Stadium: Estádio Municipal 22 de Junho; Attendance: 2,927; Referee: (Portugal) Artur Soares Dias

13 January 2024 17	Casa Pia	0–2	Famalicão	Rio Maior
15:30 WET	Clayton (yellow card) 25'; Ricardo Batista (red card) 86'	Report	Chiquinho 45+1'; Youssouf (yellow card) 61'; Cádiz 66'	Stadium: Estádio Municipal de Rio Maior; Attendance: 1,240; Referee: (Portugal) Fábio Melo

18 January 2024 18	Famalicão	1–2	Braga	Vila Nova de Famalicão
18:45 WET	Otávio (yellow card) 27'; Cádiz 62' (pen.) (yellow card) 76'; Chiquinho (yellow card) 64'; Gustavo Assunção (red card) 90+1'; Filipe Soares (yellow card) 90+13'	Report	Vitor Carvalho (yellow card) 21'; Pizzi (yellow card) 26'; Borja 73' (yellow card) 90+12'; João Moutinho (yellow card) 89'; Álvaro Djaló 90+11'; Abel Ruiz (yellow card) 90+13'	Stadium: Estádio Municipal 22 de Junho; Attendance: 3,988; Referee: (Portugal) Manuel Oliveira

28 January 2024 19	Moreirense	1–0	Famalicão	Moreira de Cónegos
15:30 WET	Marcelo (yellow card) 20'; Ofori (yellow card) 43'; Maracás 82'; Kewin (yellow card) 90+5'	Report	Francisco Moura (yellow card) 17'; Gustavo Sá (yellow card) 68'	Stadium: Parque de Jogos Comendador Joaquim de Almeida Freitas; Attendance: 2,327; Referee: (Portugal) Nuno Almeida

10 February 2024 21	Farense	1–1	Famalicão	Faro
15:30	Bruno 90+2'		Sorriso 19'	Stadium: Estádio de São Lúis; Referee: Hélder Malheiro

16 February 2024 22	Famalicão	2–1	Rio Ave	Vila Nova de Famalicão
20:15	Cádiz 17', 66'		Yakubu 14' (pen.); Silva (penalty missed) 90+2'	Stadium: Estádio Municipal 22 de Junho; Referee: Artur Soares Dias

23 February 2024 23	Arouca	3–2	Famalicão	Arouca
20:15 WET	Sylla 33'; Jason (yellow card) 45'; Cristo González 45+1'; Rafa Mújica (yellow card) 54' (goal) 64'	Report	Cádiz 12' (yellow card) 86'; Youssouf (yellow card) 38'; Sorriso (yellow card) 44'; Gustavo Sá 56'; Mihaj (yellow card) 61'; Riccieli (yellow card) 75'; Rodríguez (red card) 90+4'; Óscar Aranda (yellow card) 90+9'	Stadium: Estádio Municipal de Arouca; Attendance: 1,361; Referee: (Portugal) Luís Godinho

4 March 2024 24	Famalicão	1–1	Boavista	Vila Nova de Famalicão
20:15 WET	Florian Thomas Danho Séké 16'; Topić (yellow card) 40'; de Haas (yellow card) 82'	Report	Pérez (yellow card) 30'; Salvador Agra (yellow card) 48' (goal) 69'	Stadium: Estádio Municipal 22 de Junho; Attendance: 3,198; Referee: (Portugal) Fábio Melo

9 March 2024 25	Vitória de Guimarães	1–0	Famalicão	Guimarães
20:30 WET	Jorge Fernandes (yellow card) 31'; Jota Silva 38'	Report	Mihaj (yellow card) 54'; de Haas (yellow card) 59'; Chiquinho (yellow card) 87'	Stadium: Estádio D. Afonso Henriques; Attendance: 12,909; Referee: (Portugal) Iancu Vasilica

16 March 2024 26	Famalicão	0–0	Estrela	Vila Nova de Famalicão
15:30 WET	Riccieli (yellow card) 90+5'	Report	Kialonda Gaspar (yellow card) 61'; N'do (yellow card) 66'; Rúben Lima (yellow card) 71'; Miguel Lopes (yellow card) 90+6'	Stadium: Estádio Municipal 22 de Junho; Attendance: 4,713; Referee: (Portugal) Nuno Almeida

29 March 2024 27	Gil Vicente	1–2	Famalicão	Barcelos
15:30 WET	Rúben Fernandes (yellow card) 63'; Murilo Costa 72'	Report	Chiquinho (yellow card) 22' (goal) 68'; Cádiz 45+4' (pen.); de Haas (yellow card) 75'; Nathan Santos (yellow card) 84'	Stadium: Estádio Cidade de Barcelos; Attendance: 4,255; Referee: (Portugal) André Narciso

6 April 2024 28	Famalicão	3–2	Vizela	Vila Nova de Famalicão
15:30 WET	Chiquinho 8' (yellow card) 11'; Rodríguez (yellow card) 20'; Riccieli 43' (yellow card) 90'; Youssouf (yellow card) 82'; Francisco Moura (yellow card) 90+2'; Cádiz 90+5' (yellow card) 90+6'	Report	Busnić (yellow card) 47'; Lokilo 55'; Petrov 80'	Stadium: Estádio Municipal 22 de Junho; Attendance: 3,713; Referee: (Portugal) Bruno Vieira

13 April 2024 29	Porto	2–2	Famalicão	Porto
18:00 WET	Youssouf 17' (o.g.); Otávio (yellow card) 43'; Wendell (yellow card) 60'; Taremi 82'; Varela (yellow card) 83'; Evanilson (red card) 90+3'; Galeno (yellow card) 90+3'	Report	Cádiz 9' 45+1' (yellow card) 83'; Youssouf (yellow card) 69'; Mihaj (yellow card) 90+4'	Stadium: Estádio do Dragão; Attendance: 30,510; Referee: (Portugal) Gustavo Correia

16 April 2024 20	Famalicão	0–1	Sporting CP	Vila Nova de Famalicão
20:15 WET	Zlobin (yellow card) 59'; Cádiz (yellow card) 66'	Report	Pote 20'; Diomande (yellow card) 41'; Daniel Bragança (yellow card) 43'; Ricardo Esgaio (yellow card) 74'; Hjulmand (yellow card) 90+1'	Stadium: Estádio Municipal 22 de Junho; Attendance: 4,944; Referee: (Portugal) Fábio Veríssimo

21 April 2024 30	Famalicão	2–2	Portimonense	Vila Nova de Famalicão
15:30 WET	de Haas (red card) 34'; Filipe Soares (yellow card) 45+10'; Cádiz 60' 63'; Gustavo Sá (yellow card) 66'	Report	Carlinhos (yellow card) 5' (goal) 77' (pen.); Alemão 7'; Pedrão (yellow card) 45+8'; Tamble Monteiro (yellow card) 56'; Igor Formiga (yellow card) 90+1'	Stadium: Estádio Municipal 22 de Junho; Attendance: 3,729; Referee: (Portugal) Luís Godinho

28 April 2024 31	Estoril	1–0	Famalicão	Estoril
18:00 WET	Rodrigo Gomes 34'	Report	Nathan Santos (yellow card) 61'; Youssouf (yellow card) 87'	Stadium: Estádio António Coimbra da Mota; Attendance: 3,191; Referee: (Portugal) Manuel Oliveira

5 May 2024 32	Famalicão	2–0	Benfica	Vila Nova de Famalicão
20:30 WET	Cádiz (yellow card) 63'; Rodríguez 71' (yellow card) 87'; Youssouf 85'	Report	Tiago Gouveia (yellow card) 87'	Stadium: Estádio Municipal 22 de Junho; Attendance: 4,827; Referee: (Portugal) João Ferreira

10 May 2024 33	Chaves	0–1	Famalicão	Chaves
20:15 WET	Ygor Nogueira (yellow card) 51'; João Correia (yellow card) 67'; Jô (yellow card) 79'	Report	Gustavo Sá 45+2'; Chiquinho (yellow card) 81'	Stadium: Estádio Municipal Eng. Manuel Branco Teixeira; Attendance: 1,528; Referee: (Portugal) Ricardo Baixinho

17 May 2024 34	Famalicão	1–2	Casa Pia	Vila Nova de Famalicão
18:45 WET	Youssouf 4'; Chiquinho (yellow card) 51'; Gustavo Sá (yellow card) 60'; Francisco Moura (yellow card) 60'; Nathan Santos (yellow card) 70'	Report	Felippe Cardoso 22' (yellow card) 27'; Beni Mukendi (yellow card) 45+3'; Nuno Moreira 56'; Segovia (yellow card) 60'; Neto (yellow card) 85'; Lucas Paes (yellow card) 90+7'	Stadium: Estádio Municipal 22 de Junho; Attendance: 3,115; Referee: (Portugal) Bruno Vieira

=== Taça de Portugal ===
18 November 2023 Third Round	Camacha	0–5	Famalicão	Santa Cruz
14:15 WET	Wellyson Nunes (yellow card) 19'; Luís Miguel (yellow card) 37'; Gabriel Fraga (yellow card) 38'; Fábio Faria (yellow card) 65'; Cristiano Abreu (yellow card) 67'; Kenedy Có (yellow card) 80'	Report	Francisco Moura 20'; Pablo 29' 90+1'; Youssouf (yellow card) 45'; Gustavo Sá 50'; Dobre 90'	Stadium: Campo Municipal da Nogueira; Referee: (Portugal) Bruno Vieira

25 November 2023 Fourth Round	Benfica	2–0	Famalicão	Lisbon
20:45 WET	Riccieli 72' (o.g.); Di María (yellow card) 76'; Rafa Silva 77'	Report	Youssouf (yellow card) 42'; Otávio (red card) 74'; Luiz Júnior (yellow card) 77'	Stadium: Estádio da Luz; Attendance: 52,609; Referee: (Portugal) Manuel Oliveira

=== Taça da Liga ===
23 July 2023 First Round	Belenenses	3–2	Famalicão	Lisbon
18:00 WET	Attard (yellow card) 2' (goal) 14'; Akas 61'; Danny Tavares (yellow card) 72'; Duarte Valente 90+11' (pen.); Moha Keita (yellow card) 90+14'	Report	Gustavo Sá (yellow card) 24' (yellow-red card) 90+1'; Riccieli 31'; Pablo (yellow card) 52'; Cádiz 67'	Stadium: Estádio do Restelo; Attendance: 1,358; Referee: (Portugal) Fábio Melo
