= 2021–22 F.C. Famalicão season =

F.C. Famalicão
2021–22 season
- Owner: Idan Ofer
- Chairman: Miguel Ribeiro
- Manager: Ivo Vieira
- Stadium: Estádio Municipal 22 de Junho
- Primeira Liga: 8th
- Taça de Portugal: Fifth round
- Taça da Liga: Third round
Home colours	Away colours	Third colours

The 2021–22 season was the 72nd season in the existence of F.C. Famalicão and the club's third consecutive season in the top flight of Portuguese football. In addition to the domestic league, Famalicão participated in this season's edition of the Taça de Portugal and the Taça da Liga.

== Players ==
=== First-team squad ===
As of 9 September 2021

Note: Flags indicate national team as defined under FIFA eligibility rules; some limited exceptions apply. Players may hold more than one non-FIFA nationality.

No.	Pos.	Nation	Player
1	GK	RUS	Ivan Zlobin
3	DF	POR	Rúben Lima
4	DF	BRA	Alex (on loan from Santos)
5	DF	ESP	Adrián Marín (on loan from Granada)
6	MF	SUI	Charles Pickel
7	FW	POR	Ivo Rodrigues
8	MF	POR	Pedro Brazão
9	FW	POR	Marcos Paulo (on loan from Atlético Madrid)
10	MF	ESP	Iván Jaime
11	FW	BRA	Bruno Rodrigues (on loan from Tombense)
13	GK	BRA	Dalberson
15	DF	BRA	Riccieli
17	FW	FRA	Simon Banza (on loan from Lens)
19	DF	FRA	Dylan Batubinsika
20	MF	POR	David Tavares

No.	Pos.	Nation	Player
22	DF	ARG	Hernán De La Fuente
25	FW	POR	Pedro Marques (on loan from Sporting CP)
30	MF	POR	André Ricardo
31	GK	BRA	Luiz Júnior
43	DF	POR	Alexandre Penetra
55	DF	GHA	Abdul Ibrahim
63	DF	TUR	Gürkan Başkan
75	FW	BRA	Geovani
77	FW	POR	Pablo
80	MF	GHA	Lawrence Ofori
88	MF	POR	Pêpê (on loan from Olympiacos)
90	DF	POR	Diogo Figueiras
91	FW	POR	Heriberto Tavares
99	FW	BRA	Amarildo
—	MF	POR	Bernardo Silva

=== Out on loan ===
Note: Flags indicate national team as defined under FIFA eligibility rules; some limited exceptions apply. Players may hold more than one non-FIFA nationality.

No.	Pos.	Nation	Player
—	DF	ESP	Dani Morer (at Andorra)
—	DF	POR	Diogo Queirós (at Real Valladolid)
—	DF	NED	Calvin Verdonk (at NEC)
—	DF	BRA	Patrick William (at Estoril)

No.	Pos.	Nation	Player
—	MF	BRA	Gustavo Assunção (at Galatasaray)
—	MF	AUS	Ryan Teague (at Sporting da Covilhã)
—	FW	SUI	Rubén del Campo (at Melilla)
—	FW	BRA	João Neto (at Benfica B)

== Pre-season and friendlies ==
Win Draw Loss Fixtures

== Competitions ==
=== Overall record ===
Competition	First match	Last match	Starting round	Final position	Record							
Competition	First match	Last match	Starting round	Final position	Pld	W	D	L	GF	GA	GD	Win %
Primeira Liga	7 August 2021	May 2022	Matchday 1		19	3	7	9	23	35	−12	15.79
Taça de Portugal	15 October 2021	21 December 2021	Third round	Fifth round	3	2	1	0	7	2	+5	66.67
Taça da Liga	24 July 2021	26 October 2021	First round	Third round	4	3	0	1	8	2	+6	75.00
Total					26	8	8	10	38	39	−1	30.77

Last updated: 23 January 2022
Source: Soccerway

=== Primeira Liga ===
==== League table ====
Pos	Team	Pld	W	D	L	GF	GA	GD	Pts	Qualification or relegation
6	Vitória de Guimarães	34	13	9	12	50	41	+9	48	Qualification for the Europa Conference League second qualifying round (Note: Since the winners of the 2021–22 Taça de Portugal, Porto, qualified for the Champions League based on league position, the spot awarded to the fourth-placed team (Europa Conference League third qualifying round) was passed to the fifth-placed team, and the spot awarded to the fifth-placed team (Europa Conference League second qualifying round) was passed to the sixth-placed team.)
7	Santa Clara	34	9	13	12	38	54	−16	40	
8	Famalicão	34	9	12	13	45	51	−6	39 (Note: Head-to-head points: Famalicão 4, Estoril 1.)	
9	Estoril	34	9	12	13	36	43	−7	39	
10	Marítimo	34	9	11	14	39	44	−5	38 (Note: Head-to-head points: Marítimo 10, Paços de Ferreira 8, Boavista 7, Portimonense 6.)	

Source: Liga Portugal
Rules for classification: 1) Points; 2) Head-to-head points; 3) Head-to-head goal difference; 4) Head-to-head away goals scored; 5) Goal difference; 6) Matches won; 7) Goals scored; 8) Play-off.

==== Results summary ====
Overall								Home						Away					
Pld	W	D	L	GF	GA	GD	Pts	W	D	L	GF	GA	GD	W	D	L	GF	GA	GD
34	9	12	13	45	51	−6	39	5	7	5	22	21	+1	4	5	8	23	30	−7

Last updated: 15 May 2022.
Source: Liga Portugal

==== Results by round ====
Round	1	2	3	4	5	6	7	8	9	10	11	12	13	14	15	16	17	18	19	20	21	22	23	24	25	26	27	28	29	30	31	32	33	34
Ground	A	H	A	H	A	H	A	H	A	H	A	H	A	H	A	A	H	H	A	H	A	H	A	H	A	H	A	H	A	H	A	H	A	H
Result	L	L	L	D	D	D	L	L	W	D	W	L	L	L	D	D	W	D	L	D	L	W	W	W	L	D	D	L	L	D	D	W	W	W
Position	14	17	17	17	17	15	18	18	15	16	12	13	15	15	16	14	16	16	17	16	17	14	12	11	12	12	12	14	14	13	14	13	12	8

Updated to match(es) played on 15 May 2022. Source: Liga Portugal
A = Away; H = Home; W = Win; D = Draw; L = Loss

==== Matches ====
8 August 2021 1	Paços de Ferreira	2–0	Famalicão	Paços de Ferreira
20:30 WEST (UTC+1)		Report		Stadium: Estádio da Mata Real; Attendance: 1,743; Referee: Miguel Nogueira

15 August 2021 2	Famalicão	1–2	Porto	Vila Nova de Famalicão
18:00 WEST (UTC+1)	Riccieli 55'	Report	Martínez 13', 43'	Stadium: Estádio Municipal 22 de Junho; Attendance: 1,388; Referee: Nuno Almeida

20 August 2021 3	Arouca	2–1	Famalicão	Arouca
19:00 WEST (UTC+1)	Basso 66' (pen.); Silva 89'	Report	Rodrigues 23'	Stadium: Estádio Municipal de Arouca; Attendance: 648; Referee: David Silva

28 August 2021 4	Famalicão	1–1	Sporting CP	Vila Nova de Famalicão
20:30 WEST (UTC+1)	Mendes 68' (o.g.)	Report	Palhinha 82'	Stadium: Estádio Municipal de Famalicão; Attendance: 1,332; Referee: Fábio Veríssimo

12 September 2021 5	Moreirense	2–2	Famalicão	Moreira de Cónegos
15:30 WEST (UTC+1)		Report		Stadium: Parque Joaquim de Almeida Freitas; Attendance: 1,331; Referee: Manuel Mota

18 September 2021 6	Famalicão	0–0	Marítimo	Vila Nova de Famalicão
15:30 WEST (UTC+1)		Report		Stadium: Estádio Municipal 22 de Junho; Attendance: 2,014; Referee: Vítor Ferreira

25 September 2021 7	Tondela	3–2	Famalicão	Tondela
20:30 WEST (UTC+1)		Report		Stadium: Estádio João Cardoso; Attendance: 439; Referee: João Gonçalves

1 October 2021 8	Famalicão	1–2	Vitória de Guimarães	Vila Nova de Famalicão
18:00 WEST (UTC+1)		Report		Stadium: Estádio Municipal 22 de Junho; Attendance: 3,429; Referee: Thomas Leonard

23 October 2021 9	Santa Clara	0–2	Famalicão	Ponta Delgada
15:30 WEST (UTC+1)	Lincoln (yellow card) 15'; González (red card) 51'; Allano (yellow card) 57'; Júlio Romão (yellow card) 86' (yellow-red card) 90'	Report	Banza 44' 54' (pen.) (yellow card) 84' (yellow-red card) 89'	Stadium: Estádio de São Miguel; Attendance: 830; Referee: (Portugal) Hugo Silva

31 October 2021 10	Famalicão	1–1	Vizela	Vila Nova de Famalicão
20:30 WEST (UTC+1)	Alexandre Penetra (yellow card) 58'; Batubinsika 90+8'	Report	Claudemir (yellow card) 51'; Guilherme Schettine 82'	Stadium: Estádio Municipal 22 de Junho; Attendance: 1,773; Referee: (Portugal) André Narciso

5 November 2021 11	Boavista	2–5	Famalicão	Porto
21:15 WET (UTC+0)	Hamache (yellow card) 40'; Musa 44'; Nathan (yellow card) 45'; Cannon (red card) 58'; Abascal (yellow card) 63' (yellow-red card) 90+3'; Pérez (yellow card) 65'; Njie 74'	Report	Pedro Brazão 3'; Banza 16' (yellow card) 37' (goal) 48'; Alexandre Penetra 45+1'; Iván Jaime (yellow card) 55'; Pêpê Rodrigues 72'; Pablo (yellow card) 82'	Stadium: Estádio do Bessa; Attendance: 3,479; Referee: (Portugal) Manuel Mota

27 November 2021 12	Famalicão	0–3	Portimonense	Vila Nova de Famalicão
15:30 WET (UTC+0)	Ivo Rodrigues (yellow card) 75'	Report	Alexandre Penetra 23' (o.g.); Carlinhos 39'; Angulo (yellow card) 54'; Willyan (yellow card) 59'; Pedro Sá (yellow card) 62'; Aylton Boa Morte 70'	Stadium: Estádio Municipal 22 de Junho; Attendance: 3,111; Referee: (Portugal) Fábio Veríssimo

5 December 2021 13	Gil Vicente	4–0	Famalicão	Barcelos
18:00 WET (UTC+0)	Fujimoto 3' (yellow card) 18'; Fran Navarro 22' 76'; Hackman (yellow card) 37'; Murilo 40'; Aburjania (yellow card) 73'	Report	De La Fuente (yellow card) 25'; David Tavares (yellow card) 53'; Brono Rodrigues (yellow card) 90+4'	Stadium: Estádio Cidade de Barcelos; Attendance: 2,117; Referee: (Portugal) Rui Costa

12 December 2021 14	Famalicão	1–4	Benfica	Vila Nova de Famalicão
18:00 WET (UTC±0)	Rodrigues 25'; Ivo (yellow card) 45+1'; Riccieli (yellow card) 74'	Report	Gonçalves (yellow card) 3'; Núñez 6', 15', 55'; Silva 46'; Weigl (yellow card) 74'	Stadium: Estádio Municipal 22 de Junho; Attendance: 3,994; Referee: (Portugal) Hugo Miguel

17 December 2021 15	Estoril	2–2	Famalicão	Estoril
21:15 WET (UTC±0)	Bernardo Vital (yellow card) 30'; Rui Fonte 45'; Chiquinho 45+2'; André Franco (yellow card) 90+2'; João Gamboa (yellow card) 90+3'	Report	Luiz Júnior (yellow card) 13'; Alexandre Penetra (yellow card) 21'; Bernardo Vital 42' (o.g.); Banza 53'; Ofori (yellow card) 63'; Pickel (yellow card) 90+2'; Riccieli (yellow card) 90+3'	Stadium: Estádio António Coimbra da Mota; Attendance: 853; Referee: (Portugal) Nuno Almeida

9 January 2022 17	Braga	2–2	Famalicão	Braga
18:00 WET (UTC±0)	R. Horta 13'; González 90'	Report	Lima 31'; Rodrigues 81'	Stadium: Estádio Municipal de Braga; Attendance: 4,487; Referee: (Portugal) Fábio Melo

13 January 2022 16	Famalicão	1–0	B-SAD	Vila Nova de Famalicão
18:00 WET (UTC±0)	Riccieli (yellow card) 48' (goal) 62'	Report	Pedro Nuno (yellow card) 21'; Carraça (yellow card) 77'	Stadium: Estádio Municipal 22 de Junho; Attendance: 2,633; Referee: (Portugal) André Narciso

16 January 2022 18	Famalicão	0–0	Paços de Ferreira	Vila Nova de Famalicão
18:30 WET (UTC±0)	Alexandre Penetra (yellow card) 26' (yellow-red card) 69'; Alex (yellow card) 67'; Batubinsika (yellow card) 90+3'	Report	Maracás (yellow card) 33'; Diaby (yellow card) 74'; Eustáquio (yellow card) 77'	Stadium: Estádio Municipal 22 de Junho; Attendance: 4,559; Referee: (Portugal) Hélder Malheiro

23 January 2022 19	Porto	3–1	Famalicão	Porto
20:30 WET (UTC±0)	Otávio 25'; Luis Díaz 37'; Taremi 78' (pen.)	Report	Riccieli 90+1'	Stadium: Estádio do Dragão; Attendance: 23,725; Referee: Rui Costa

31 January 2022 20	Famalicão	0–0	Arouca	Vila Nova de Famalicão
21:15 WET (UTC±0)	Alex (yellow card) 75'; Marín (yellow card) 90+5'	Report	Basso (yellow card) 37'; Bukia (yellow card) 54'; Esgaio (yellow card) 59'	Stadium: Estádio Municipal 22 de Junho; Attendance: 2,760; Referee: Fábio Veríssimo

6 February 2022 21	Sporting CP	2–0	Famalicão	Lisbon
20:30 WET (UTC±0)	Sarabia 6' (pen.); Reis 63'	Report		Stadium: Estádio José Alvalade; Attendance: 25,640; Referee: André Narciso

13 February 2022 22	Famalicão	5–0	Moreirense	Vila Nova de Famalicão
15:30 WET (UTC±0)	Pêpê Rodrigues 25' (pen.); Riccieli (yellow card) 29'; Banza 31'; Adrián Marín 34'; Alex (yellow card) 40'; João Carlos Teixeira 45'; Ivo Rodrigues (yellow card) 48'; Gustavo Assunção (yellow card) 51'; Dolček 69'	Report	Pablo (yellow card) 33'; Kewin (yellow card) 34'; Mateus Pasinato (yellow card) 35'; Fábio Pacheco (yellow card) 44'; Rosić (yellow card) 56'	Stadium: Estádio Municipal 22 de Junho; Attendance: 2,641; Referee: (Portugal) Tiago Martins (referee)

20 February 2022 23	Marítimo	0–1	Famalicão	Funchal
15:30 WET (UTC±0)	Cláudio Winck (yellow card) 41' (yellow-red card) 45+5'; Xadas (yellow card) 80'	Report	Banza 7'; Luiz Júnior (yellow card) 45'; João Carlos Teixeira (yellow card) 73'; Gustavo Assunção (yellow card) 90+3'	Stadium: Estádio do Marítimo; Attendance: 3,940; Referee: (Portugal) João Ferreira

26 February 2022 24	Famalicão	2–1	Tondela	Vila Nova de Famalicão
15:30 WET (UTC±0)	Banza (yellow card) 53' (goal) 67'; Pickel (yellow card) 55'; João Carlos Teixeira 71'; Cádiz (yellow card) 87'; Luiz Júnior (yellow card) 90+9'; Dolček (yellow card) 90+19'	Report	Iker Undabarrena (yellow card) 47'; Manu Hernando (yellow card) 61'; Sagnan (yellow card) 89'; Daniel dos Anjos 90+2'	Stadium: Estádio Municipal 22 de Junho; Attendance: 4,388; Referee: (Portugal) Hélder Malheiro

23 April 2022 31	Benfica	0–0	Famalicão	Lisbon
18:00 WEST (UTC+1)	Gonçalves (yellow card) 34'; Weigl (yellow card) 78'	Report	Pickel (yellow card) 32'; Marín (yellow card) 54'; Riccieli (yellow card) 54'; Rodrigues (yellow card) 89'	Stadium: Estádio da Luz; Attendance: 37,894; Referee: António Nobre

9 May 2022 33	Belenenses SAD	2–3	Famalicão	Oeiras
20:15 WEST (UTC+1)	Tavares (yellow card) 26'; Alex 44' (o.g.); Sousa (yellow card) 90+2'; Baraye 90+3'; Carraça (yellow card) 90+6'	Report	Marín 67'; Rodrigues 76'; Banza (yellow card) 90+2'; Pêpê 90+5'	Stadium: Estádio Nacional; Attendance: 1,173; Referee: Hélder Malheiro

=== Taça de Portugal ===
15 October 2021 Third round	Académica	0–4	Famalicão	Coimbra
18:00 WEST (UTC+1)		Report	Penetra 15'; Jaime 18'; Tavares 25'; Banza 63'	Stadium: Estádio Cidade de Coimbra; Referee: Manuel Oliveira

20 November 2021 Fourth round	Alverca	1–2	Famalicão	Alverca do Ribatejo
19:45 WET (UTC±0)	Rodrigues 31'	Report	Brazão 69'; Banza 72'	Stadium: Campo Futebol Clube Alverca; Referee: Joao Goncalves

21 December 2021 Fifth round	Famalicão	1–1 (a.e.t.) (2–4 p)	Portimonense	Vila Nova de Famalicão
20:45 WET (UTC±0)	Bruno Rodrigues 83'	Report	Boa Morte 46'	Stadium: Estádio Municipal 22 de Junho; Referee: Manuel Oliveira

=== Taça da Liga ===
24 July 2021 First round	Feirense	0–1	Famalicão	Santa Maria da Feira
17:00 WEST (UTC+1)		Report	I. Rodrigues 17'	Stadium: Estádio Marcolino de Castro; Attendance: 0 Referee: Hugo Silva

1 August 2021 Second round	Famalicão	1–0	Estoril	Vila Nova de Famalicão
14:00 WEST (UTC+1)	B. Rodrigues 9'	Report		Stadium: Estádio Municipal 22 de Junho; Attendance: 444; Referee: António Nobre

22 September 2021 Third round 1	Famalicão	5–0	Penafiel	Vila Nova de Famalicão
21:15 WEST (UTC+1)	I. Rodrigues 35'; Banza 57'; Marques 70', 89'; B. Rodrigues 73'	Report		Stadium: Estádio Municipal 22 de Junho; Attendance: 1,569; Referee: David Silva

26 October 2021 Third round 2	Sporting CP	2–1	Famalicão	Lisbon
21:15 WEST (UTC+1)	Ugarte 8'; Santos 61'	Report	Tavares 90'	Stadium: Estádio José Alvalade; Attendance: 14,755; Referee: Manuel Mota
