= 2022–23 F.C. Famalicão season =

F.C. Famalicão
2022–23 season
- Chairman: Miguel Ribeiro
- Manager: Rui Pedro Silva (until 20 September); João Pedro Sousa (from 22 September)
- Stadium: Estádio Municipal 22 de Junho
- Primeira Liga: 8th
- Taça de Portugal: Semi-finals
- Taça da Liga: Group stage
- Top goalscorer: League: Iván Jaime (9); All: Iván Jaime (11)

The 2022–23 season is the 92nd in the history of F.C. Famalicão and their fourth consecutive season in the top flight. The club will participate in the Primeira Liga, the Taça de Portugal, and the Taça da Liga.

== Players ==
As of 30 January 2023

Note: Flags indicate national team as defined under FIFA eligibility rules; some limited exceptions apply. Players may hold more than one non-FIFA nationality.

No.	Pos.	Nation	Player
1	GK	RUS	Ivan Zlobin
2	DF	POR	Diogo Queirós
4	DF	ALB	Enea Mihaj
5	DF	POR	Rúben Lima
6	DF	POR	Alexandre Penetra
7	FW	POR	Ivo Rodrigues
8	MF	POR	André Simões
9	FW	POR	Leandro Sanca (on loan from Spezia)
10	MF	ESP	Iván Jaime
11	MF	POR	Pedro Brazão
12	MF	BRA	Gustavo Assunção
14	FW	FRA	Junior Kadile (on loan from Rennes)
15	DF	BRA	Riccieli (captain)
17	FW	POR	Rui Fonte

No.	Pos.	Nation	Player
18	MF	CPV	David Tavares
19	MF	PAN	Puma Rodríguez
20	MF	POR	Gustavo Sá
23	FW	ROU	Alex Dobre (on loan from Dijon)
25	MF	GBS	Pelé (on loan from Monaco)
28	MF	FRA	Zaydou Youssouf
29	FW	VEN	Jhonder Cádiz
31	GK	BRA	Luiz Júnior
32	DF	ESP	Martín Aguirregabiria
70	FW	BRA	Denílson
74	DF	POR	Francisco Moura (on loan from Braga)
77	FW	POR	Pablo
95	FW	POR	Théo Fonseca
97	MF	ARG	Santiago Colombatto (on loan from León)

=== Out on loan ===
Note: Flags indicate national team as defined under FIFA eligibility rules; some limited exceptions apply. Players may hold more than one non-FIFA nationality.

No.	Pos.	Nation	Player
—	DF	COD	Dylan Batubinsika (at Maccabi Haifa until 30 June 2023)
—	DF	ARG	Hernán de la Fuente (at Atlético Tucumán until 31 December 2023)
—	DF	ESP	Dani Morer (at Andorra until 30 June 2023)
—	MF	POR	Samuel Lobato (at B-SAD until 30 June 2023)

No.	Pos.	Nation	Player
—	MF	GHA	Lawrence Ofori (at Moreirense until 30 June 2023)
—	MF	POR	Bernardo Silva (at Real until 30 June 2023)
—	FW	POR	Heri (at Ponferradina until 30 June 2023)
—	FW	BRA	João Neto (at Benfica B until 30 June 2023)

== Pre-season and friendlies ==
Win Draw Loss Fixtures

2 July 2022 Friendly	Famalicão (Portugal)	3–0	(Portugal) Famalicão U23	TBD
--:-- WEST (UTC+1)

15 July 2022 Friendly	Famalicão (Portugal)	1–3	(Portugal) Torreense	TBD
--:-- WEST (UTC+1)

16 July 2022 Friendly	Famalicão (Portugal)	1–2	(Portugal) Vizela	TBD
10:00 WEST (UTC+1)

20 July 2022 Friendly	Trofense (Portugal)	2–1	(Portugal) Famalicão	TBD
10:00 WEST (UTC+1)

23 July 2022 Friendly	Paços de Ferreira (Portugal)	1–0	(Portugal) Famalicão	Paços de Ferreira
10:30 WEST (UTC+1)	Sales 66'			Stadium: Estádio da Mata Real

29 July 2022 Friendly	Famalicão (Portugal)	1–1	(France) Paris 13 Atletico	TBD
--:-- WEST (UTC+1)	Millán

== Competitions ==
=== Overall record ===
Competition	First match	Last match	Starting round	Final position	Record							
Competition	First match	Last match	Starting round	Final position	Pld	W	D	L	GF	GA	GD	Win %
Primeira Liga	6 August 2022	26 May 2023	Matchday 1	8th	34	13	5	16	39	47	−8	38.24
Taça de Portugal	15 October 2022	4 May 2023	Third round	Semi-finals	5	3	0	2	12	7	+5	60.00
Taça da Liga	26 November 2022	15 December 2022	Group stage	Group stage	4	1	2	1	2	2	+0	25.00
Total					43	17	7	19	53	56	−3	39.53

Source: Soccerway

=== Primeira Liga ===
==== League table ====
Pos	Team	Pld	W	D	L	GF	GA	GD	Pts	Qualification or relegation
6	Vitória de Guimarães	34	16	5	13	34	39	−5	53	Qualification for the Europa Conference League second qualifying round
7	Chaves	34	12	10	12	35	40	−5	46	
8	Famalicão	34	13	5	16	39	47	−8	44	
9	Boavista	34	12	8	14	43	54	−11	44	
10	Casa Pia	34	11	8	15	31	40	−9	41	

Source: Liga Portugal
Rules for classification: 1) Points; 2) Head-to-head points; 3) Head-to-head goal difference; 4) Goal difference; 5) Matches won; 6) Goals scored; 7) Play-off.

==== Results summary ====
Overall								Home						Away					
Pld	W	D	L	GF	GA	GD	Pts	W	D	L	GF	GA	GD	W	D	L	GF	GA	GD
34	13	5	16	39	47	−8	44	9	1	7	21	19	+2	4	4	9	18	28	−10

Last updated: 26 May 2023.
Source: Liga Portugal

==== Results by round ====
Round	1	2	3	4	5	6	7	8	9	10	11	12	13	14	15	16	17	18	19	20	21	22	23	24	25	26	27	28	29	30	31	32	33	34	35
Ground	A	H	A	H	A	H	A	H	A	H	A	A	H	A	H	A	H	H	A	H	A	H	A	H	A	H	A	H	H	A	H	A	H	A	A
Result	L	L	D	W	L	L	L	W	L	W	L	D	L	W	W	L	D	W	L	L	W	W	L	W	W	L	W	W	W	L	L	D	L	D	D
Position	16	18	16	15	15	15	16	15	15	14	14	14	15	14	14	14	15	13	14	15	13	10	10	12	9	9	10	9	8	8	8	8	8	8	7

Updated to match(es) played on 26 May 2023. Source: Liga Portugal
A = Away; H = Home; W = Win; D = Draw; L = Loss

==== Matches ====
The league fixtures were announced on 5 July 2022.

6 August 2022 1	Estoril	2–0	Famalicão	Estoril
18:00 WEST (UTC+1)	Geraldes 20'; Arthur 45'	Report		Stadium: Estádio António Coimbra da Mota; Referee: Nuno Almeida

12 August 2022 2	Famalicão	0–3	Braga	Vila Nova de Famalicão
20:15 WEST (UTC+1)	Batubinsika (yellow card) 25'; de la Fuente (yellow card) 90+3'; Gustavo Sá (yellow card) 90+4'	Report	Sequeira 13'; Banza 18', 79'; Fabiano (yellow card) 45+1'	Stadium: Estádio António Coimbra da Mota; Attendance: 4 637; Referee: Luís Godinho

22 August 2022 3	Gil Vicente	0–0	Famalicão	Barcelos
20:15 WEST (UTC+1)	Boselli (yellow card) 48'	Report	Rodrigues (yellow card) 29'; Colombatto (yellow card) 67'; Luiz Júnior (yellow card) 72'; Fonseca (yellow card) 90+4'; de la Fuente (yellow card) 90+6'	Stadium: Estádio Cidade de Barcelos; Attendance: 4 245; Referee: Claúdio Pereira

28 August 2022 4	Famalicão	1–0	Santa Clara	Vila Nova de Famalicão
15:30 WEST (UTC+1)	Youssouf 20'; Kadile (yellow card) 45+2'; Mihaj (yellow card) 84'; Moura (yellow card) 87'; Rui Silva (red card) 90'	Report	P. Henrique (yellow card) 15'; Marco (yellow card) 45+2'; Sagna (yellow card) 68'	Stadium: Estádio António Coimbra da Mota; Attendance: 3 636; Referee: Fábio Veríssimo

4 September 2022 5	Portimonense	1–0	Famalicão	Portimão
20:30 WEST (UTC+1)	Pedrão (yellow card) 14' (goal) 65'; Welinton Júnior (yellow card) 31'; Relvas (yellow card) 39'; Seck (yellow card) 47'; Gomes (yellow card) 61'	Report	Youssouf (yellow card) 48'; Colombatto (yellow card) 50'	Stadium: Estádio Municipal de Portimão; Attendance: 1 840; Referee: Artur Soares Dias

10 September 2022 6	Famalicão	0–1	Benfica	Vila Nova de Famalicão
15:30 WEST (UTC+1)	Colombatto (yellow card) 90+2'; Gustavo Sá (yellow card) 90+4'; Rodrigues (red card) 90+6'	Report	Rafa 63'	Stadium: Estádio Municipal 22 de Junho; Attendance: 4 867; Referee: Nuno Almeida
Note: Ivo Rodrigues was sent off after the game was ended.

18 September 2022 7	Casa Pia	1–0	Famalicão	Oeiras
18:00 WEST (UTC+1)	Bolgado 59'; Taira (yellow card) 77'	Report	Pelé (yellow card) 45'	Stadium: Estádio Nacional; Attendance: 917; Referee: Miguel Nogueira

2 October 2022 8	Famalicão	4–0	Boavista	Vila Nova de Famalicão
20:30 WEST (UTC+1)	Rodrigues 25' (yellow card) 31'; Puma 43'; Youssouf 52'; Gustavo Assunção 85'	Report	Abascal (yellow card) 23'; Malheiro (yellow card) 60'; Sasso (yellow card) 68'	Stadium: Estádio Municipal 22 de Junho; Attendance: 3 783; Referee: Gustavo Correira

10 October 2022 9	Arouca	4–1	Famalicão	Arouca
20:15 WEST (UTC+1)	Bukia 30'; Sylla 52'; Antony 58'; Dabbagh 83'	Report	Colombatto 21'; Puma (yellow card) 34'; Millán (yellow card) 61'; Fonte (yellow card) 69'; Gustavo Assunção (yellow card) 77'	Stadium: Estádio Municipal de Arouca; Attendance: 1 018; Referee: André Narciso

22 October 2022 10	Famalicão	2–1	Paços de Ferreira	Vila Nova de Famalicão
15:30 WEST (UTC+1)	Kadile 20'; Youssouf (yellow card) 42'; Moura 46'; Puma (yellow card) 66'	Report	Thomas 23'; Pires (yellow card) 31'; Antunes (yellow card) 64'; Toma (yellow card) 66'	Stadium: Estádio Municipal 22 de Junho; Attendance: 2 380; Referee: Miguel Nogueria

31 October 2022 11	Vitória de Guimarães	3–2	Famalicão	Guimarães
20:15 WEST (UTC+1)	Johnston 20'; da Luz (yellow card) 31' (goal) 55', 64'; Zé Carlos (yellow card) 71'; Afonso (yellow card) 90+1'; Safira (yellow card) 90+4'; Douglas Jesus (red card) 90+5'	Report	Moura (yellow card) 44'; Gustavo Assunção (yellow card) 68'; Millán 74', 83'; Colombatto (yellow card) 85'; Pelé (yellow card) 90+1'; Lima (yellow card) 90+2'; de la Fuente (red card) 90+5'	Stadium: Estádio D. Afonso Henriques; Attendance: 14 968; Referee: António Nobre
Note: Douglas Jesus and Hernán de la Fuente was sent off after the game was ended.

6 November 2022 12	Marítimo	0–0	Famalicão	Funchal
18:00 WEST (UTC+1)	Andrade (yellow card) 30'; Vidigal (yellow card) 62'	Report	Rodrigues (yellow card) 45+4'; Penetra (yellow card) 71'	Stadium: Estádio do Marítimo; Attendance: 9 438; Referee: Fábio Veríssimo

13 November 2022 13	Famalicão	1–2	Sporting CP	Vila Nova de Famalicão
20:30 WEST (UTC+1)	Lima (yellow card) 45'; Puma (yellow card) 45'; Riccieli (yellow card) 53'; Jaime 76'; Fonte (yellow card) 83'	Report	Ugarte (yellow card) 21'; Inácio (yellow card) 29'; Trincão (yellow card) 41' (goal) 43'; Matheus Reis (yellow card) 45'; St. Juste (yellow card) 45'; Gonçalves 45+3'; Pedro Porro (yellow card) 89'; Coates (yellow card) 90+6'	Stadium: Estádio Municipal 22 de Junho; Attendance: 3 937; Referee: Artur Soares Dias

30 December 2022 14	Chaves	0–2	Famalicão	Chaves
17:00 WEST (UTC+1)	Langa (yellow card) 17'; Jô (yellow card) 20'; Guima (yellow card) 39'; Issah (yellow card) 90+4'	Report	Jhonder 18'; Penetra (yellow card) 35'; Gustavo Sá (yellow card) 44'; Mihaj (yellow card) 45+6'; Jaime 53'; Pablo (yellow card) 57'; Colombatto (yellow card) 80'	Stadium: Estádio Municipal Eng. Manuel Branco Teixeira; Attendance: 2 304; Referee: Hélder Malherio

6 January 2023 15	Famalicão	2–1	Vizela	Vila Nova de Famalicão
21:15 WEST (UTC+1)	Iván Jaime (yellow card) 32' (goal) 81'; Alexandre Penetra 45+1'; Gustavo Assunção (yellow card) 62'; Colombatto (yellow card) 90+2'	Report	Bruno Wilson (yellow card) 18'; Igor Julião (yellow card) 43'; Kiko Bondoso 49'; Matheus Pereira (yellow card) 66'; Samu (yellow card) 72'; Claudemir (yellow card) 75'; Mendez (yellow card) 84'	Stadium: Estádio Municipal 22 de Junho; Attendance: 3,334; Referee: (Portugal) Tiago Martins

15 January 2023 16	Porto	4–1	Famalicão	Porto
20:30 WEST (UTC+1)	Galeno 10' 21' (yellow card) 36'; Otávio 42'; Wendell (yellow card) 44'; Taremi 48'; Iván Marcano (yellow card) 55'	Report	Rui Fonte 52'; Luiz Júnior (yellow card) 57'	Stadium: Estádio do Dragão; Attendance: 33,313; Referee: (Portugal) Gustavo Correia

22 January 2023 17	Famalicão	0–0	Rio Ave	Vila Nova de Famalicão
20:30 WEST (UTC+1)		Report	João Graça (yellow card) 29'; Josué Sá (yellow card) 78'; Samaris (yellow card) 90+3'	Stadium: Estádio Municipal 22 de Junho; Attendance: 3,660; Referee: (Portugal) João Ferreira

29 January 2023 18	Famalicão	1–0	Estoril	Vila Nova de Famalicão
20:30 WEST (UTC+1)	Colombatto 54'; Francisco Moura (yellow card) 57'; Alexandre Penetra (yellow card) 72'; Gustavo Assunção (yellow card) 90+5'	Report	Francisco Geraldes (yellow card) 64'; Joãozinho (yellow card) 64'; Mexer (yellow card) 73'; Léa Siliki (yellow card) 90+5'	Stadium: Estádio Municipal 22 de Junho; Attendance: 3,407; Referee: (Portugal) Miguel Nogueira

5 February 2023 19	Braga	4–1	Famalicão	Braga
15:30 WEST (UTC+1)	Mihaj 22' (o.g.); Al-Musrati (yellow card) 53'; Iuri Medeiros (yellow card) 60'; Banza 79'; Paulo Oliveira (yellow card) 82'; Bruma 90+1' 90+3'	Report	Youssouf (yellow card) 45+1'; Leandro Sanca 71'; Gustavo Assunção (yellow card) 81'; Ivo Rodrigues (yellow card) 83'	Stadium: Estádio Municipal de Braga; Attendance: 14,331; Referee: (Portugal) Ricardo Baixinho

12 February 2023 20	Famalicão	0–1	Gil Vicente	Vila Nova de Famalicão
15:30 WEST (UTC+1)	Iván Jaime (yellow card) 50'	Report	Aburjania (yellow card) 27'; Murilo Costa 51'; Rúben Fernandes (yellow card) 53'; Boselli (yellow card) 57'; Pedro Tiba (yellow card) 67'; Zé Carlos (yellow card) 85'; Aouacheria (yellow card) 89'	Stadium: Estádio Municipal 22 de Junho; Attendance: 4,483; Referee: (Portugal) Manuel Oliveira

19 February 2023 21	Santa Clara	1–3	Famalicão	Ponta Delgada
15:30 WEST (UTC+1)	Adriano (yellow card) 24'; Xavi Quintillà 75' (pen.) (yellow card) 75'; Ygor Nogueira (red card) 76'	Report	Youssouf (yellow card) 19'; Francisco Moura (yellow card) 33'; Iván Jaime 48'; Cádiz (red card) 76'; Paulo Eduardo 82' (o.g.); Alexandre Penetra 90+4'; Leandro Sanca (yellow card) 90+5'	Stadium: Estádio de São Miguel; Attendance: 1,618; Referee: (Portugal) André Narciso

24 February 2023 22	Famalicão	1–0	Portimonense	Vila Nova de Famalicão
20:15 WEST (UTC+1)	Leandro Sanca 85'; Gustavo Assunção (yellow card) 90+6'; Dobre (red card) 90+10'	Report	Lucas Ventura (yellow card) 70'; Pedro Sá (yellow card) 79'; Maurício (yellow card) 88'	Stadium: Estádio Municipal 22 de Junho; Attendance: 2,965; Referee: (Portugal) Fábio Veríssimo

3 March 2023 23	Benfica	2–0	Famalicão	Lisbon
21:15 WEST (UTC+1)	Gonçalo Ramos 36' 90+3'; Otamendi (yellow card) 71'	Report	Youssouf (yellow card) 61'; Gustavo Sá (yellow card) 73'; Martín Aguirregabiria (yellow card) 79'	Stadium: Estádio da Luz; Attendance: 56,995; Referee: (Portugal) Artur Soares Dias

13 March 2023 24	Famalicão	1–0	Casa Pia	Vila Nova de Famalicão
20:15 WEST (UTC+1)	Leandro Sanca (yellow card) 21'; Iván Jaime 36'; Alexandre Penetra (yellow card) 48'; Pablo (yellow card) 85'; Gustavo Assunção (yellow card) 90+6'	Report	Ângelo Neto (yellow card) 68'; Felippe Cardoso (yellow card) 70'; Soma (yellow card) 86'	Stadium: Estádio Municipal 22 de Junho; Attendance: 2,729; Referee: (Portugal) Bruno José Costa

19 March 2023 25	Boavista	1–2	Famalicão	Porto
20:30 WEST (UTC+1)	Boženík 72'; Cannon (yellow card) 82'	Report	Iván Jaime 57' (pen.) (yellow card) 88'; Dobre 60'	Stadium: Estádio do Bessa; Attendance: 5,530; Referee: (Portugal) Ricardo Baixinho

3 April 2023 26	Famalicão	0–1	Arouca	Vila Nova de Famalicão
20:15 WEST (UTC+1)	Gustavo Assunção (yellow card) 90+4'	Report	Sylla 90+3' (pen.)	Stadium: Estádio Municipal 22 de Junho; Attendance: 4,030; Referee: (Portugal) Carlos Macedo

8 April 2023 27	Paços de Ferreira	1–3	Famalicão	Paços de Ferreira
18:00 WEST (UTC+1)	Hernâni Infande 34'; Nuno Lima (yellow card) 50'; Paulo Bernardo (yellow card) 69'	Report	Cádiz 41'; Iván Jaime 70' 87'	Stadium: Estádio da Mata Real; Attendance: 4,992; Referee: (Portugal) Rui Costa

14 April 2023 28	Famalicão	2–1	Vitória de Guimarães	Vila Nova de Famalicão
20:15 WEST (UTC+1)	Cádiz 10'; Riccieli (red card) 23'; Youssouf (yellow card) 45+2'; Francisco Moura 70'	Report	Jota Silva (yellow card) 19'; Tounkara (yellow card) 25'; Tiago Silva (red card) 33'; Dani Silva 64'; Safira (yellow card) 90+6'	Stadium: Estádio Municipal 22 de Junho; Attendance: 4,042; Referee: (Portugal) André Narciso

22 April 2023 29	Famalicão	3–2	Marítimo	Vila Nova de Famalicão
15:30 WEST (UTC+1)	Otávio (yellow card) 27'; Cádiz 64'; Ivo Rodrigues 69' (pen.) (yellow card) 90+8'; Pablo 90+8'; Alexandre Penetra (yellow card) 90+10'	Report	Riascos 18'; André Vidigal 38'; João Afonso (yellow card) 45'; Marcelo Carné (yellow card) 62'; Edgar Costa (red card) 65'; Matheus Costa (yellow card) 72'	Stadium: Estádio Municipal 22 de Junho; Attendance: 4,044; Referee: (Portugal) Hélder Malheiro

30 April 2023 30	Sporting CP	2–1	Famalicão	Lisbon
20:30 WEST (UTC+1)	Morita 18'; Ugarte (yellow card) 45+1'; Ricardo Esgaio 60'; Youssef Chermiti (yellow card) 90+3'	Report	Gustavo Sá (yellow card) 45+3'; Riccieli (yellow card) 61'; Coates 69' (o.g.); Gustavo Assunção (yellow card) 78'	Stadium: Estádio José Alvalade; Attendance: 29,443; Referee: (Portugal) Manuel Oliveira

8 May 2023 31	Famalicão	1–2	Chaves	Vila Nova de Famalicão
19:00 WEST (UTC+1)	Ivo Rodrigues (yellow card) 27'; Pablo 53'; Riccieli (yellow card) 88'	Report	Guima (yellow card) 22'; Euller (yellow card) 38'; João Mendes (yellow card) 45+1'; Riccieli 80' (o.g.); João Teixeira 89' (pen.)	Stadium: Estádio Municipal 22 de Junho; Attendance: 3,681; Referee: (Portugal) João Ferreira

13 May 2023 32	Vizela	0–0	Famalicão	Vizela
15:30 WEST (UTC+1)	Matheus Pereira (yellow card) 41'; Anderson (yellow card) 45+2'; Etim (yellow card) 90'	Report	Francisco Moura (yellow card) 58'; Leandro Sanca (yellow card) 71' (yellow-red card) 76'; Gustavo Assunção (yellow card) 90+5'; Rui Fonte (yellow card) 90+7'	Stadium: Estádio do FC Vizela; Attendance: 2,717; Referee: (Portugal) António Nobre

20 May 2023 33	Famalicão	2–4	Porto	Vila Nova de Famalicão
20:30 WEST (UTC+1)	Luiz Júnior (yellow card) 6'; Ivo Rodrigues (yellow card) 26'; Iván Jaime 33'; Colombatto 44' (pen.) (yellow card) 45+1'; Youssouf (yellow card) 66'; Otávio (yellow card) 73'	Report	Taremi 7' (pen.) 10' (yellow card) 18' (goal) 67' (pen.) 75' (pen.); Pepê (yellow card) 42'; Otávio (yellow card) 57'	Stadium: Estádio Municipal 22 de Junho; Attendance: 4,992; Referee: (Portugal) Fábio Veríssimo

26 May 2023 34	Rio Ave	2–2	Famalicão	Vila do Conde
19:00 WEST (UTC+1)	Samaris (yellow card) 65'; Boateng 70'; Ukra (yellow card) 74'; Patrick William (yellow card) 75'; Ruiz 82'; Sávio (yellow card) 87'	Report	Rúben Lima 10'; Dobre 12' (yellow card) 64'; Youssouf (red card) 30'; Colombatto (yellow card) 75'; Ivo Rodrigues (yellow card) 83'; Otávio (yellow card) 90+8'	Stadium: Estádio dos Arcos; Attendance: 3,037; Referee: (Portugal) Carlos Macedo

=== Taça de Portugal ===
15 October 2022 Third round	Trofense	0–1	Famalicão	Trofa
15:00 WET (UTC+0)	Silva (yellow card) 69'; Caio (yellow card) 88'; Okitokandjo (yellow card) 90+5'	Report	Moura (yellow card) 25'; Puma 69'; Colombatto (yellow card) 76'; Penetra (yellow card) 90+4'	Stadium: Estádio do CD Trofense; Referee: Rui Costa
Note: Stevy Okitokandjo got the (yellow card) after the match ended.

9 November 2022 Fourth round	Famalicão	4–1	Dumiense	Vila Nova de Famalicão
15:00 WET (UTC±00:00)	Jhonder 19', 28'; Colombatto (yellow card) 29' (goal) 48'; Youssouf 45+1'	Report	Martins (yellow card) 18' (goal) 66'; Silveira (yellow card) 51'; Albano (yellow card) 58'; Cabrera (yellow card) 68'; T. Ferreira (yellow card) 76'	Stadium: Estádio Municipal 22 de Junho; Referee: Manuel Oliveira

10 January 2023 Fifth round	Leixões	1–2 (a.e.t.)	Famalicão	Matosinhos
18:45 WET (UTC+00:00)	Oliveira (yellow card) 11'; Stefanović (yellow card) 67'; Thalis 90+8' (pen.); Ricardo Valente (yellow card) 96'; João Meira (yellow card) 120+2'	Report	Colombatto (yellow card) 30'; Riccieli (yellow card) 31'; Rui Fonte (yellow card) 58'; Gustavo Assunção (yellow card) 60'; Alexandre Penetra 77'; Youssouf (yellow card) 83'; David Tavares (yellow card) 90+3'; Cádiz (yellow card) 90+6' (yellow-red card) 114' (goal) 108'	Stadium: Estádio do Mar; Referee: (Portugal) Ricardo Baixinho

8 February 2023 Quarter-finals	Famalicão	4–1	B-SAD	Vila Nova de Famalicão
18:45 WET (UTC+00:00)	Gonçalo Tabuaço 37' (o.g.); Gustavo Sá (yellow card) 52'; Cádiz 57' 59'; Iván Jaime 68'	Report	Martim Coxixo (yellow card) 31'; Rúben Oliveira 65'	Stadium: Estádio Municipal 22 de Junho; Referee: (Portugal) João Ferreira

26 April 2023 Semi-finals; First leg	Famalicão	1–2	Porto	Vila Nova de Famalicão
20:30 WEST (UTC+1)	Penetra 36'; Moura (yellow card) 45+1'; Pablo (yellow card) 80'; Otávio (yellow card) 90+1'	Report	Marcano 16'; Grujić (yellow card) 31'; Otávio (yellow card) 44'; Martínez 63'	Stadium: Estádio Municipal 22 de Junho; Referee: Gustavo Correia

4 May 2023 Semi-finals; Second leg	Porto	3–2 (a.e.t.) (5–3 agg.)	Famalicão	Porto
20:30 WEST (UTC+1)	Galeno 28' (pen.); Pepe (yellow card) 30'; Otávio 120+1', (yellow card) 120+3'; Evanilson 120+5'	Report	Cádiz 21'; Dobre (yellow card) 26'; Colombatto (yellow card) 39'; Jaime 75'; Rodrigues (yellow card) 83'; Mihaj (yellow card) 100'; Penetra (yellow card) 108'; Moura (yellow card) 110'; Denílson (yellow card) 112'	Stadium: Estádio do Dragão; Referee: Manuel Mota

=== Taça da Liga ===
==== Third round ====
Pos	Team	Pld	W	D	L	GF	GA	GD	Pts	Qualification	ACV	TOR	FAM	TON	EST
1	Académico de Viseu	4	2	2	0	9	5	+4	8	Advance to knockout phase	—	—	—	4–1	3–2
2	Torreense	4	1	3	0	5	4	+1	6		1–1	—	1–0	—	—
3	Famalicão	4	1	2	1	2	2	0	5		1–1	—	—	0–0	—
4	Tondela	4	0	3	1	2	5	−3	3		—	1–1	—	—	0–0
5	Estoril	4	0	2	2	4	6	−2	2		—	2–2	0–1	—	—

Source: Liga Portugal
Rules for classification: Tiebreakers

26 November 2022 2	Famalicão	1–1	Académico de Viseu	Vila Nova de Famalicão
15:00 WET (UTC±00:00)	Kadile (yellow card) 36'; Jhonder 60'	Report	André Clóvis 17'; Toro (yellow card) 41'; Almeida (yellow card) 62'; Nduwarugira (yellow card) 65'; Messeguem (yellow card) 69'; Gril (yellow card) 74'	Stadium: Estádio Municipal 22 de Junho; Attendance: 2 399; Referee: Manuel Oliveira

2 December 2022 3	Torreense	1–0	Famalicão	Torres Vedras
15:00 WET (UTC±00:00)	Oliveira (yellow card) 33'; Vieira 50'; Gustavo Marques (yellow card) 52'; Cícero (yellow card) 57'; Maciel (yellow card) 64'; Lameira (yellow card) 75'	Report	Colombatto (yellow card) 22'; Riccieli (yellow card) 49' (yellow-red card) 79'; Jhonder (yellow card) 49'	Stadium: Estádio Manuel Marques; Attendance: 355; Referee: Luís Godinho

9 December 2022 4	Famalicão	0–0	Tondela	Vila Nova de Famalicão
20:45 WET (UTC±00:00)	Youssouf (yellow card) 51'	Report	Arcanjo (yellow card) 7' (yellow-red card) 15'; Marcelo Alves (yellow card) 45'; Valésio (yellow card) 90+4'	Stadium: Estádio Municipal 22 de Junho; Attendance: 1 287; Referee: Gustavo Correia

15 December 2022 5	Estoril	0–1	Famalicão	Estoril
20:00 WET (UTC±00:00)	Erison (yellow card) 40' (yellow-red card) 66'; Ndiaye (yellow card) 41'; Carvalho (yellow card) 71'; Léa Siliki (yellow card) 90+3'	Report	Colombatto 9'; Mihaj (yellow card) 44'; Moura (yellow card) 45+3'; Gustavo Sá (yellow card) 45+3'; Pablo (yellow card) 65'	Stadium: Estádio António Coimbra da Mota; Attendance: 435; Referee: Fábio Veríssimo
