= 2024–25 F.C. Famalicão season =

F.C. Famalicão
2024–25 season
- Head coach: Armando Evangelista (until 6 December)
- Stadium: Estádio Municipal de Famalicão
- Primeira Liga: 7th
- Taça de Portugal: Fourth round
- Average home league attendance: 3,808

The 2024–25 season is the 92nd season in the history of Futebol Clube de Famalicão, and the club's sixth consecutive season in Primeira Liga. In addition to the domestic league, the team will participate in the Taça de Portugal.

== Players ==
Note: Flags indicate national team as defined under FIFA eligibility rules; some limited exceptions apply. Players may hold more than one non-FIFA nationality.

No.	Pos.	Nation	Player
1	GK	RUS	Ivan Zlobin (captain)
2	DF	BRA	Lucas Calegari
3	DF	ECU	Leo Realpe
4	DF	ALB	Enea Mihaj
5	DF	POR	Rafa Soares
6	MF	NED	Tom van de Looi
7	FW	BRA	Sorriso
8	MF	SRB	Mirko Topić
10	MF	POR	Rochinha
11	FW	ESP	Óscar Aranda
12	FW	FRA	Simon Elisor
13	DF	ANG	Pedro Bondo
14	MF	POR	Mathias De Amorim
15	MF	GEO	Otar Mamageishvili
16	DF	NED	Justin de Haas
17	DF	POR	Rodrigo Pinheiro
18	MF	FIN	Otso Liimatta

No.	Pos.	Nation	Player
20	MF	POR	Gustavo Sá
21	FW	MAR	Yassir Zabiri
22	GK	BRA	Gabriel Cabral
23	FW	POR	Gil Dias
25	GK	MNE	Lazar Carević
29	FW	CZE	Václav Sejk
55	DF	SEN	Ibrahima Ba
75	DF	POR	Diogo Costa
88	MF	POR	Samuel Lobato
90	GK	POR	Hugo Cunha

== Transfers ==
=== In ===
Pos.	Player	Transferred from	Fee	Date	Source
DF	(Brazil) Calegari	(Brazil) Fluminense	Loan	27 July 2024	

=== Out ===
Pos.	Player	Transferred to	Fee	Date	Source
DF	(Spain) Martín Aguirregabiria	(Spain) FC Cartagena	Contract termination	1 July 2024	
MF	(Portugal) Théo Fonseca	(Portugal) Felgueiras		9 July 2024	

== Friendlies ==
=== Pre-season ===
The club announced a pre-season program on June 21, with the Famalisão team returning to training on July 1, and will play five matches against local clubs and one match against La Liga 2 club Deportivo La Coruña.

13 July 2024 Friendly	Famalicão (Portugal)	4–0	(Portugal) Famalicão U23	Famalicão
		Report		Stadium: Estádio Municipal de Famalicão

17 July 2024 Friendly	Famalicão (Portugal)	3–0	(Portugal) Trofense
10:00 UTC+1	Pablo; Zaydou Youssouf; Rochinha	Report

20 July 2024 Friendly	Famalicão (Portugal)	1–1	(Portugal) Leixões
10:30	Óscar Aranda

24 July 2024 Friendly	Famalicão (Portugal)	3–1	(Portugal) Penafiel
10:30	Ruben Pereira (o.g.); Ibrahima Ba; Leonardo Oliveira		André Silva

27 July 2024 Friendly	Famalicão (Portugal)	v	(Portugal) Casa Pia

30 July 2024 Friendly	Famalicão (Portugal)	v	(Spain) Deportivo La Coruña
19:30

== Competitions ==
=== Overall record ===
Competition	First match	Last match	Starting round	Record							
Competition	First match	Last match	Starting round	Pld	W	D	L	GF	GA	GD	Win %
Primeira Liga	9–12 August 2024	May 2025	Matchday 1	0	0	0	0	0	0	+0	—
Taça de Portugal				0	0	0	0	0	0	+0	—
Total				0	0	0	0	0	0	+0	—

Source: Soccerway

=== Primeira Liga ===
==== League table ====
Pos	Team	Pld	W	D	L	GF	GA	GD	Pts	Qualification or relegation
5	Santa Clara	34	17	6	11	36	32	+4	57	Qualification for the Conference League second qualifying round
6	Vitória de Guimarães	34	14	12	8	47	37	+10	54	
7	Famalicão	34	12	11	11	44	39	+5	47	
8	Estoril	34	12	10	12	48	53	−5	46	
9	Casa Pia	34	12	9	13	39	44	−5	45	

Source: Liga Portugal
Rules for classification: 1) Points; 2) Head-to-head points; 3) Head-to-head goal difference; 4) Goal difference; 5) Matches won; 6) Goals scored; 7) Play-off.

==== Results summary ====
Overall								Home						Away					
Pld	W	D	L	GF	GA	GD	Pts	W	D	L	GF	GA	GD	W	D	L	GF	GA	GD
0	0	0	0	0	0	0	0	0	0	0	0	0	0	0	0	0	0	0	0

==== Results by round ====
Round	1
Ground	H
Result	
Position	

A = Away; H = Home; W = Win; D = Draw; L = Loss

==== Matches ====
The match schedule was released on 7 July 2024.

11 August 2024 1	Famalicão	2–0	Benfica	Vila Nova de Famalicão
18:00	Sorriso 12'; Luiz Júnior (yellow card) 66'; Youssouf (yellow card) 73' (goal) 90'; Lobato (yellow card) 90+2'	Report	João Mário (yellow card) 16'; Prestianni (yellow card) 45+3'; Kökçü (yellow card) 57'; Carreras (yellow card) 80'	Stadium: Estádio Municipal 22 de Junho; Attendance: 5,025; Referee: (Portugal) Fábio Veríssimo

19 August 2024 2	Estrela da Amadora	0–3	Famalicão	Amadora
20:15	Keliano (yellow card) 26'; Kikas (yellow card) 64'; Veiga (yellow card) 80'	Report	Sorriso 36'; Zlobin (yellow card) 66'; Youssouf 83'; González 90+3'	Stadium: Estádio José Gomes; Attendance: 4,769; Referee: (Portugal) Bruno Vieira

24 August 2024 3	Famalicão	1–0	Boavista	Vila Nova de Famalicão
20:30	Sá 6'; Mihaj (yellow card) 58'	Report	Gomes (yellow card) 16'; Ferreira (yellow card) 32'; Vukotić (yellow card) 41'	Stadium: Estádio Municipal 22 de Junho; Attendance: 4,319; Referee: (Portugal) David Silva
