= Riccieli =

Brazilian footballer

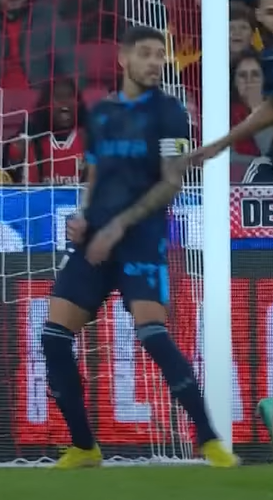
- Riccieli playing for Famalicão in 2023

Personal information
- Full name: Riccieli Eduardo da Silva Junior
- Date of birth: 17 September 1998 (age 28)
- Place of birth: Resende, Brazil
- Height: 1.84 m (6 ft 0 in)
- Position: Centre-back

Team information
- Current team: Vitória (on loan from Famalicão)
- Number: 5

Youth career
- 2015–2016: Resende
- 2016–2017: Mirassol

Senior career*
Years	Team	Apps	(Gls)
2015–2016	Resende	0	(0)
2016–2019	Mirassol	23	(2)
2019–	Famalicão	138	(6)
2025	→ Qingdao West Coast (loan)	29	(2)
2026–	→ Vitória (loan)	5	(0)
- * Club domestic league appearances and goals as of 8 April 2026

Riccieli Eduardo da Silva Junior (born 17 September 1998), known as Riccieli, is a Brazilian footballer who plays as a centre-back for Campeonato Brasileiro Série A club Vitória, on loan from Portuguese club Famalicão.

== Career ==
=== Early career ===
Born in Resende, Rio de Janeiro, Riccieli began his career with hometown side Resende. He made his senior debut on 28 October 2015, starting in a 0–0 away draw against Gonçalense, for the year's Copa Rio; it was his only appearance for the side, as they won the tournament.

Riccieli moved to Mirassol in 2016, being initially a member of the under-20 squad. He first appeared with the senior side on 2 August of that year, replacing Hélio Batista in the first half of a 1–0 Copa Paulista home win over Marília.

Riccieli was definitely promoted to the first team of Leão in January 2017, but only featured in the Copa Paulista in that year. He only started to feature more regularly in the 2018 campaign, scoring his first senior goal on 13 May of that year by netting the opener in a 2–0 Série D home win over Inter de Lages.

Riccieli was a regular starter of Mirassol in the 2019 Campeonato Paulista, and impressed during the competition.

=== Famalicão ===
On 3 July 2019, Riccieli moved abroad and joined Portuguese Primeira Liga side Famalicão. He made his debut for the club on 10 August, replacing Rúben Lameiras late into a 2–0 away win over Santa Clara.

Riccieli scored his first goal abroad on 16 February 2020, netting a last-minute equalizer in a 1–1 home draw against Desportivo Aves. On 19 November, already established as a starter, he renewed his contract until 2025.

Riccieli subsequently became a team captain, and reached 100 matches for Famalicão in December 2022. On 28 December, he further extended his link until 2027.

In January 2024, after having an offer from CSKA Moscow refused by Famalicão, Riccieli lost his starting spot for nearly a month before regaining his status in March. He reached 150 matches for the club in May.

In January 2025, Famalicão sent Riccieli on loan to Chinese Super League club Qingdao West Coast until the end of the 2025 season, with a reported €2 million optional buy-clause.

In January 2026, after his loan with Qingdao West Coast expired, Riccieli was loaned again, this time back to his homeland, joining Série A side Vitória until the end of the 2026 season.

== Career statistics ==
As of match played 22 November 2025

Appearances and goals by club, season and competition
Club	Season	League			State league		Cup		League cup		Continental		Other		Total	
Club	Season	Division	Apps	Goals	Apps	Goals	Apps	Goals	Apps	Goals	Apps	Goals	Apps	Goals	Apps	Goals
Resende	2015	Série D	0	0	—		—		—		—		1 (Note: All appearance(s) in Copa Rio)	0	1	0
Mirassol	2016	Paulista A2	—		—		—		—		—		3 (Note: All appearance(s) in Copa Paulista)	0	3	0
Mirassol	2017	Paulista	—		0	0	—		—		—		10	0	10	0
Mirassol	2018	Série D	6	1	3	0	—		—		—		18	2	27	3
Mirassol	2019	Paulista	—		14	1	—		—		—		—		14	1
Mirassol	Subtotal		6	1	17	1	—		—		—		31	2	54	4
Famalicão	2019–20	Primeira Liga	25	1	—		6	0	0	0	—		—		31	1
Famalicão	2020–21	Primeira Liga	26	1	—		0	0	0	0	—		—		26	1
Famalicão	2021–22	Primeira Liga	25	3	—		1	0	2 (Note: All appearance(s) in Taça da Liga)	0	—		—		28	3
Famalicão	2022–23	Primeira Liga	30	0	—		6	0	6	0	—		—		39	0
Famalicão	2023–24	Primeira Liga	24	1	—		2	0	1	1	—		—		27	2
Famalicão	2024–25	Primeira Liga	8	0	—		2	0	—		—		—		10	0
Famalicão	Subtotal		138	6	—		17	0	9	1	—		—		164	7
Qingdao West Coast (loan)	2025	Chinese Super League	29	2	—		2	0	—		—		—		31	2
Career total			173	9	17	1	19	0	9	1	0	0	32	2	250	13

== Honours ==
Resende

- Copa Rio: 2015
