= Gustavo Sá =

Portuguese footballer (born 2004)

Personal information
- Full name: Gustavo Filipe Alves de Freitas Azevedo e Sá
- Date of birth: 11 November 2004 (age 22)
- Place of birth: Póvoa de Varzim, Portugal
- Height: 1.89 m (6 ft 2 in)
- Position: Attacking midfielder

Team information
- Current team: Olympiacos (on loan from Nottingham Forest)
- Number: 8

Youth career
- 2012–2015: Academia Elite Sport
- 2015–2018: Porto
- 2018–2022: Famalicão

Senior career*
| Years | Team | Apps | (Gls) |
| 2022–2026 | Famalicão | 108 | (11) |
| 2026– | Nottingham Forest | 0 | (0) |
| 2026– | → Olympiacos (loan) | 9 | (0) |

International career^{‡}
| 2022 | Portugal U18 | 10 | (3) |
| 2022–2023 | Portugal U19 | 12 | (6) |
| 2023 | Portugal U20 | 4 | (1) |
| 2024– | Portugal U21 | 17 | (2) |
Medal record
Men's football
Representing Portugal
UEFA European Under-19 Championship
| Runner-up | 2023 Malta |
- * Club domestic league appearances and goals as of 20:55, 22 November 2026 (UTC) ‡ National team caps and goals as of 21:44, 17 November 2026 (UTC)

Gustavo Filipe Alves de Freitas Azevedo e Sá (born 11 November 2004) is a Portuguese professional footballer who plays as an attacking midfielder for Super League Greece club Olympiacos, on loan from Nottingham Forest.

== Club career ==
=== Famalicão ===
Born in Póvoa de Varzim, Porto District, Sá spent three years at Porto's youth system and his final four at Famalicão's. On 19 October 2021, aged 16, he signed a professional contract until 2024; in June 2022, he started training with the first team and he was handed an extension until 2025.

Sá made his Primeira Liga debut with the club on 12 August 2022, as a late substitute in a 3–0 home loss against Braga. He scored his first goal in the competition on 4 November 2023, one week shy of his 19th birthday, opening an eventual 3–1 win over Gil Vicente also at the Estádio Municipal 22 de Junho.

On 24 August 2024, Sá scored the only goal to help the hosts defeat Boavista with a 5th-minute backheel; the effort was later voted Goal of the Month. In February 2026, he rejected a €20 million offer from Saudi Pro League side Al-Ittihad.

On 6 March 2026, Sá took the field in a match against Arouca (1–0 home victory). In the process, he broke João Moutinho's record as the youngest ever player to reach 100 games in the top division aged 21 years, 3 months and 24 days.

=== Nottingham Forest ===
On 30 July 2026, Sá joined Premier League club Nottingham Forest for a fee of around €20 million. He was immediately loaned to Olympiacos, also owned by Evangelos Marinakis.

== International career ==
Sá was a youth international for Portugal. He won his first cap for the under-21 team on 21 March 2024, taking the field in the second half of the 4–0 victory over the Faroe Islands for the 2025 UEFA European Championship qualifiers and providing an assist. He scored his first goal in qualification for the following edition of the tournament, contributing a 11–0 thrashing of Gibraltar in Europa Point.

== Career statistics ==
As of match played 31 October 2026

Appearances and goals by club, season and competition
| Club | Season | League | | | National Cup | | League Cup | | Europe | | Total | |
| Club | Season | Division | Apps | Goals | Apps | Goals | Apps | Goals | Apps | Goals | Apps | Goals |
|---|---|---|---|---|---|---|---|---|---|---|---|---|
| Famalicão | 2022–23 | Primeira Liga | 15 | 0 | 4 | 0 | 2 | 0 | — | | 21 | 0 |
| Famalicão | 2023–24 | Primeira Liga | 28 | 3 | 2 | 1 | 1 | 0 | — | | 31 | 4 |
| Famalicão | 2024–25 | Primeira Liga | 33 | 4 | 1 | 0 | — | | — | | 34 | 4 |
| Famalicão | 2025–26 | Primeira Liga | 32 | 4 | 2 | 0 | — | | — | | 34 | 4 |
| Famalicão | Total | | 108 | 11 | 9 | 1 | 3 | 0 | — | | 120 | 12 |
| Olympiacos (loan) | 2026–27 | Super League Greece | 7 | 0 | 2 | 1 | — | | 3 (Note: One appearances in UEFA Champions League, two appearances in UEFA Europa League) | 0 | 12 | 1 |
| Career total | | | 115 | 11 | 11 | 2 | 3 | 0 | 3 | 0 | 132 | 13 |
