= Francisco Moura =

Portuguese association football player

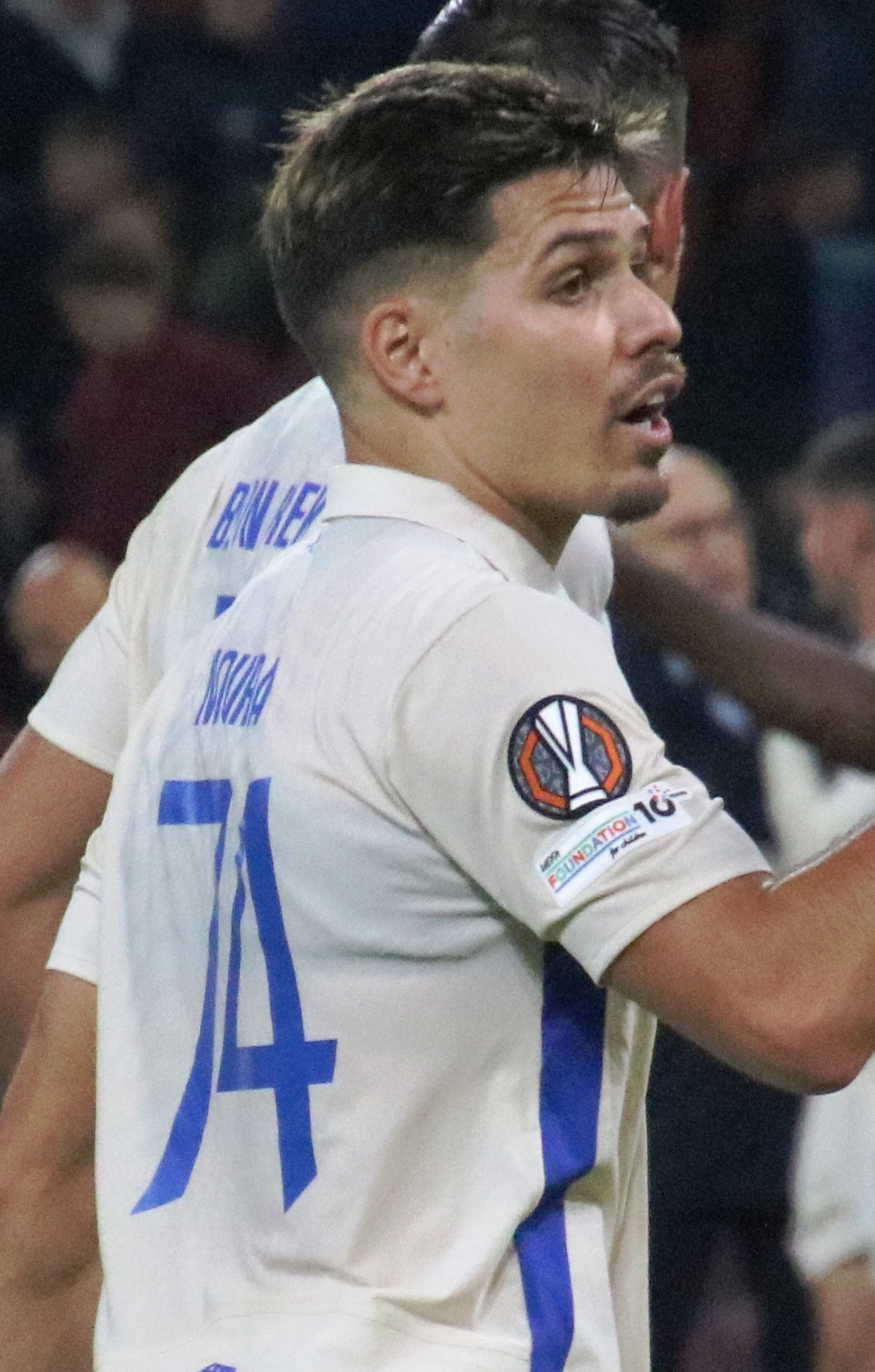
- Moura with Porto in 2025

Personal information
- Full name: Francisco Sampaio de Moura
- Date of birth: 16 August 1999 (age 27)
- Place of birth: Braga, Portugal
- Height: 1.82 m (6 ft 0 in)
- Position: Left-back

Team information
- Current team: Porto
- Number: 74

Youth career
- 2008–2011: Academia Lacatoni
- 2011–2018: Braga
- 2014–2015: → Palmeiras Braga (loan)

Senior career*
Years	Team	Apps	(Gls)
2018–2020	Braga B	5	(0)
2019–2020	→ Académica (loan)	10	(1)
2020–2023	Braga	32	(4)
2022–2023	→ Famalicão (loan)	28	(2)
2023–2024	Famalicão	37	(1)
2024–	Porto	52	(5)

International career
2017	Portugal U18	7	(0)
2017–2018	Portugal U19	14	(1)
2018–2019	Portugal U20	12	(0)
Medal record
Men's football
Representing Portugal
UEFA European Under-19 Championship
Winner	2018 Finland
- * Club domestic league appearances and goals as of 19:58, 10 October 2026 (UTC)

Francisco Sampaio de Moura (born 16 August 1999) is a Portuguese professional footballer who plays as a left-back for Primeira Liga club Porto.

== Club career ==
=== Braga ===
Born in Braga, Moura joined S.C. Braga's youth system at the age of 12. On 28 October 2018 he made his LigaPro debut with their reserves, coming on as a 68th-minute substitute in a 2–0 away loss against U.D. Oliveirense.

In the summer of 2019, Moura was loaned to Académica de Coimbra also in the Portuguese second tier. He scored his first goal as a professional on 28 December in the 4–3 home victory over Oliveirense, but appeared in only ten competitive matches during his spell at the Estádio Cidade de Coimbra.

Moura returned to Braga's first team ahead of the 2020–21 season, under newly appointed manager Carlos Carvalhal. He played his first game in the Primeira Liga on 25 September, being replaced at half-time of the 0–1 home defeat to C.D. Santa Clara.

On 8 November 2020, playing in front of Nuno Sequeira as a left midfielder, Moura scored twice in a 3–2 win at S.L. Benfica. He missed the remainder of the campaign, however, after rupturing the cruciate ligament of his left knee in training later that month.

=== Famalicão ===
Moura was loaned to F.C. Famalicão for 2022–23. At the end of the season, he signed a permanent four-year contract.

During his spell, Moura totalled 77 games, four goals and ten assists.

=== Porto ===
On 2 September 2024, Moura joined FC Porto on a five-year deal, with a €60 million buyout clause. He scored his first goal for the side on 13 February 2025, in a 1–1 home draw against AS Roma in the knockout phase play-offs of the UEFA Europa League.

On 20 November 2026, Moura scored an own goal in the 57th minute of the fourth round of the Taça de Portugal against U.S.C. Paredes where he was deployed at centre-back, levelling the score at 1–1. Visibly shaken, he became emotional and asked to be substituted. He was eventually taken off following another defensive error that could have cost his team another goal, being met with both jeers and applause from the stands at the Estádio do Dragão, and headed straight down the tunnel to the dressing room; Porto went on to win the match 3–1 on penalties, with the incident garnering widespread international attention and sparking concern over the mental health of the player, whose performances had longsince been drawing criticism from his own club's supporters.

== International career ==
Moura made three late substitute appearances for Portugal at the 2018 UEFA European Under-19 Championship that the nation won in Finland, including one in the final against Italy.

== Career statistics ==
As of match played 16 May 2026

Appearances and goals by club, season and competition
Club	Season	League			Taça de Portugal		Taça da Liga		Europe		Other		Total	
Club	Season	Division	Apps	Goals	Apps	Goals	Apps	Goals	Apps	Goals	Apps	Goals	Apps	Goals
Braga B	2018–19	Liga Portugal 2	5	0	—		—		—		—		5	0
Académica (loan)	2019–20	Liga Portugal 2	10	1	0	0	0	0	—		—		10	1
Braga	2020–21	Primeira Liga	5	2	0	0	0	0	3 (Note: Appearances in UEFA Europa League)	0	—		8	2
Braga	2021–22	Primeira Liga	27	2	3	0	2	0	10	0	0	0	42	2
Braga	2022–23	Primeira Liga	0	0	0	0	0	0	0	0	—		0	0
Braga	Total		32	4	3	0	2	0	13	0	—		50	4
Famalicão (loan)	2022–23	Primeira Liga	28	2	5	0	4	0	—		—		37	2
Famalicão	2023–24	Primeira Liga	33	1	2	1	1	0	—		—		36	2
Famalicão	2024–25	Primeira Liga	4	0	—		—		—		—		4	0
Famalicão	Total		65	3	7	1	5	0	—		—		77	4
Porto	2024–25	Primeira Liga	27	3	2	0	1	0	9	1	3 (Note: Appearances in FIFA Club World Cup)	0	42	4
Porto	2025–26	Primeira Liga	21	2	4	0	0	0	7	1	0	0	32	3
Porto	Total		48	5	6	0	1	0	16	2	3	0	74	7
Career total			160	13	16	1	8	0	29	2	3	0	216	16

== Honours ==
Porto

- Primeira Liga: 2025–26
- Supertaça Cândido de Oliveira: 2026
