= Otávio (footballer, born 2002) =

Brazilian footballer (born 2002)

Personal information
- Full name: Otávio Ataide da Silva
- Date of birth: 21 April 2002 (age 24)
- Place of birth: São Paulo, Brazil
- Height: 1.87 m (6 ft 2 in)
- Position: Centre-back

Team information
- Current team: Paris FC
- Number: 6

Youth career
- –2017: Internacional
- 2018–2020: Flamengo

Senior career*
Years	Team	Apps	(Gls)
2020–2023	Flamengo	1	(0)
2022	→ Sampaio Corrêa (loan)	1	(0)
2023	→ Famalicão (loan)	9	(0)
2023–2024	Famalicão	17	(2)
2024–2025	Porto	32	(2)
2025–	Paris FC	23	(1)
- * Club domestic league appearances and goals as of 19 May 2026

Otávio Ataide da Silva (born 21 April 2002), known simply as Otávio, is a Brazilian professional footballer who plays as a centre-back for Ligue 1 club Paris FC.

== Club career ==
=== Flamengo ===
During his youth career, Otávio played for Internacional and Flamengo. He made his professional debut for Flamengo's main team on 27 September 2020, starting in a 1–1 draw in a Série A match away at Palmeiras, after a COVID-19 outbreak ruled out most of the main squad.

==== Sampaio Corrêa (loan) ====
On 18 February 2022, Flamengo loaned Otávio to Série B club Sampaio Corrêa until the end of the 2022 season. However, he failed to break into the team, making just one appearance in the state championship and, in July 2022, the loan was cancelled and Otávio returned to Flamengo.

=== Famalicão ===
On 31 January 2023, Flamengo sent Otávio on loan to Portuguese Primeira Liga club Famalicão, until the end of the 2022–23 season. On 16 June 2023, he joined the side on a permanent deal, signing a five-year contract. Famalicão paid a reported €500.000 transfer fee for 70% of Otávio's economic rights.

=== Porto ===
On 31 January 2024, Otávio moved to Portuguese giants Porto, signing a four-and-a-half-year contract. According to reports, the Dragons paid a €12 million transfer fee for 80% of Otávio's economic rights, and his release clause was set at €50 million.

On 17 February 2024, Otávio made his debut for Porto, starting and playing the full 90 minutes in a 2–0 league victory over Estrela da Amadora at the Estádio do Dragão.

=== Paris FC ===
On 23 July 2025, after 45 matches played for Porto, Otávio signed for Ligue 1 recently promoted club Paris FC on a five-year contract. The disclosed financial details of the transfer include a base fee of €17 million, a maximum of €3 million potential add-ons, and a 15% sell-on clause. His transfer represented the most expensive player purchase for Paris FC.

== Career statistics ==
=== Club ===
As of match played 12 January 2026

Appearances and goals by club, season and competition
Club	Season	League			State league		National cup (Note: Includes Taça de Portugal, Coupe de France)		League cup (Note: Includes Taça da Liga)		Continental		Other		Total	
Club	Season	Division	Apps	Goals	Apps	Goals	Apps	Goals	Apps	Goals	Apps	Goals	Apps	Goals	Apps	Goals
Flamengo	2020	Série A	1	0	0	0	0	0	—		0	0	—		1	0
Flamengo	2021	Série A	0	0	0	0	0	0	—		0	0	—		0	0
Flamengo	Total		1	0	0	0	0	0	—		0	0	—		1	0
Sampaio Corrêa (loan)	2022	Série B	0	0	1 (Note: Appearance in Campeonato Maranhense)	0	0	0	—		—		—		1	0
Famalicão (loan)	2022–23	Primeira Liga	9	0	—		2	0	0	0	—		—		11	0
Famalicão	2023–24	Primeira Liga	17	2	—		1	0	1	0	—		—		19	2
Famalicão	Total		26	2	—		3	0	1	0	—		—		30	2
Porto	2023–24	Primeira Liga	12	0	—		3	0	0	0	2 (Note: Appearances in UEFA Champions League)	0	—		17	0
Porto	2024–25	Primeira Liga	20	2	—		0	0	1	0	5 (Note: Appearances in UEFA Europa League)	0	2 (Note: One appearance in Supertaça Cândido de Oliveira, one appearance in FIFA Club World Cup)	0	28	2
Porto	Total		32	2	—		3	0	1	0	7	0	2	0	45	2
Paris FC	2025–26	Ligue 1	14	0	—		1	0	—		—		—		15	0
Career total			73	4	1	0	7	0	2	0	7	0	2	0	92	4

== Honours ==
=== Club ===
Flamengo

- Campeonato Brasileiro Série A: 2020
- Campeonato Carioca: 2021

Porto

- Taça de Portugal: 2023–24
- Supertaça Cândido de Oliveira: 2024
