= Leonardo Realpe =

Ecuadorian footballer (born 2001)

Personal information
- Full name: Leonardo Javier Realpe Montaño
- Date of birth: 26 February 2001 (age 25)
- Place of birth: Quinindé, Ecuador
- Height: 1.86 m (6 ft 1 in)
- Position: Centre-back

Team information
- Current team: Famalicão
- Number: 3

Youth career
- 2017–2019: Independiente del Valle

Senior career*
Years	Team	Apps	(Gls)
2019	Independiente del Valle	7	(0)
2020–2025	Red Bull Bragantino	67	(1)
2024–2025	→ Famalicão (loan)	5	(0)
2025–	Famalicão	29	(1)

International career^{‡}
2023–	Ecuador	4	(0)
- * Club domestic league appearances and goals as of 5 September 2026 ‡ National team caps and goals as of 5 October 2026 (UTC)

Leonardo Javier Realpe Montaño (born 26 February 2001) is an Ecuadorian professional footballer who plays as a centre-back for Primeira Liga club Famalicão and the Ecuador national team.

== Career ==
=== Independiente Del Valle ===
Born in Quinindé, Realpe started his career at Independiente del Valle. He made his first team debut on 14 July 2019, in a 1–1 away draw against Técnico Universitario.

=== Red Bull Bragantino ===
On 10 December 2019, Realpe signed a five-year contract with Red Bull Bragantino.

On 2 September 2024 it was confirmed that Realpe joined Primeira Liga side Famalicão on a one-year loan deal. On 25 March 2025, he joined the club on a permanent basis, signing a contract until 2029.

== Career statistics ==
=== Club ===
As of match played 5 September 2026

Appearances and goals by club, season and competition
Club	Season	League			State league		National cup (Note: Includes Copa do Brasil, Taça de Portugal)		Continental		Total	
Club	Season	Division	Apps	Goals	Apps	Goals	Apps	Goals	Apps	Goals	Apps	Goals
Independiente del Valle	2019	LigaPro Serie A	7	0	—		0	0	1 (Note: Appearance(s) in Copa Sudamericana)	0	8	0
Red Bull Bragantino	2020	Série A	6	0	2 (Note: Appearances in Campeonato Paulista)	0	0	0	—		8	0
Red Bull Bragantino	2021	Série A	8	0	5	0	0	0	0	0	13	0
Red Bull Bragantino	2022	Série A	8	0	4	1	0	0	1 (Note: Appearance in Copa Libertadores)	0	13	1
Red Bull Bragantino	2023	Série A	21	0	5	0	1	0	3	0	30	0
Red Bull Bragantino	2024	Série A	1	0	7	0	0	0	0	0	8	0
Red Bull Bragantino	Total		44	0	23	1	1	0	4	0	72	1
Famalicão (loan)	2024–25	Primeira Liga	5	0	—		0	0	—		5	0
Famalicão	2025–26	Primeira Liga	24	1	—		2	0	—		26	1
Famalicão	2026–27	Primeira Liga	5	0	—		0	0	—		5	0
Famalicão	Total		29	1	—		2	0	—		31	1
Career total			85	1	23	1	3	0	5	0	116	2

=== International ===
As of 5 October 2026

Ecuador
Year	Apps	Goals
2023	2	0
2024	1	0
2026	1	0
Total	4	0

== Honours ==
=== Club ===
Independiente Del Valle

- Copa Sudamericana: 2019
