= Pablo (footballer, born 2004) =

Portuguese footballer (born 2004)

Personal information
- Full name: Pablo Felipe Pereira de Jesus
- Date of birth: 2 January 2004 (age 22)
- Place of birth: Braga, Portugal
- Height: 1.84 m (6 ft 0 in)
- Position: Forward

Team information
- Current team: West Ham United
- Number: 19

Youth career
- 2019–2022: Famalicão

Senior career*
Years	Team	Apps	(Gls)
2021–2025	Famalicão	28	(2)
2024	→ Paços Ferreira (loan)	15	(1)
2024–2025	→ Gil Vicente (loan)	20	(5)
2025–2026	Gil Vicente	13	(10)
2026–	West Ham United	23	(1)
- * Club domestic league appearances and goals as of 04:00, 1 November 2026 (UTC)

Pablo Felipe Pereira de Jesus (born 2 January 2004), known simply as Pablo, is a professional footballer who plays as a forward for EFL Championship club West Ham United.

== Career ==
=== Famalicão ===
Born in Braga to former Porto and Braga Brazilian player Pena, Pablo joined Famalicão's youth system at the age of 15, following an unsuccessful trial in his father's homeland with Fluminense. In July 2021, after having made his senior debut with the club's under-23 team, he signed a professional contract until 2024.

Pablo made his Primeira Liga debut with the main squad debut on 8 August 2021, coming on as a 60th-minute substitute in a 2–0 away loss against Paços de Ferreira. On 15 September 2022, he further extended his link until 2027. He scored his first goal in the competition the following 22 April, closing the 3–2 home win over Marítimo in the 98th minute.

On 12 January 2024, Famalicão sent Pablo on loan to Liga Portugal 2 side Paços Ferreira until the end of the season.

=== Gil Vicente ===
In September, also on loan, Pablo moved to Gil Vicente of the top division. On 1 April 2025, he scored a ten-minute hat-trick in a 3–1 away defeat of bottom-placed Boavista.

Pablo signed a permanent four-year contract with Gil Vicente on 23 June 2025. During a brief second spell, he consistently ranked amongst the league's top scorers, and spoke of his desire to represent the Portugal national team; he was voted Player of the Month as well as Best Forward and Best Young Player for September/October, collecting 26,14% of the managers' votes.

=== West Ham United ===
On 2 January 2026, Pablo signed for Premier League club West Ham United on a four-and-a-half year deal for an undisclosed fee, reported to be €25 million. He made his league debut four days later, as a 63rd-minute substitute in a 2–1 home loss against relegation rivals Nottingham Forest.

Pablo scored his first goal for the Hammers on 15 September 2026, in a 3–2 home defeat to Fulham in the third round of the EFL Cup. With his team having been relegated to the EFL Championship, his first in the league arrived on 14 October in the 6–0 victory at Lincoln City, who played with two players less for more than 70 minutes.

== Career statistics ==
As of match played 31 October 2026

Appearances and goals by club, season and competition
Club	Season	League			National cup (Note: Includes Taça de Portugal, FA Cup)		League cup (Note: Includes Taça da Liga, EFL Cup)		Other		Total	
Club	Season	Division	Apps	Goals	Apps	Goals	Apps	Goals	Apps	Goals	Apps	Goals
Famalicão	2021–22	Primeira Liga	5	0	0	0	2	0	—		7	0
Famalicão	2022–23	Primeira Liga	15	2	3	0	3	0	—		21	2
Famalicão	2023–24	Primeira Liga	8	0	1	2	1	0	—		10	2
Famalicão	Total		28	2	4	2	6	0	—		38	4
Paços Ferreira (loan)	2023–24	Liga Portugal 2	15	1	—		—		—		15	1
Gil Vicente (loan)	2024–25	Primeira Liga	20	5	3	0	—		—		23	5
Gil Vicente	2025–26	Primeira Liga	13	10	1	0	—		—		14	10
Gil Vicente	Total		33	15	4	0	—		—		37	15
West Ham United	2025–26	Premier League	14	0	3	0	—		—		17	0
West Ham United	2026–27	Championship	9	1	0	0	2	1	—		11	2
West Ham United	Total		23	1	3	0	2	1	—		28	2
Career total			99	19	11	2	8	1	0	0	118	22
