= Sorriso (footballer, born 2001) =

Brazilian footballer

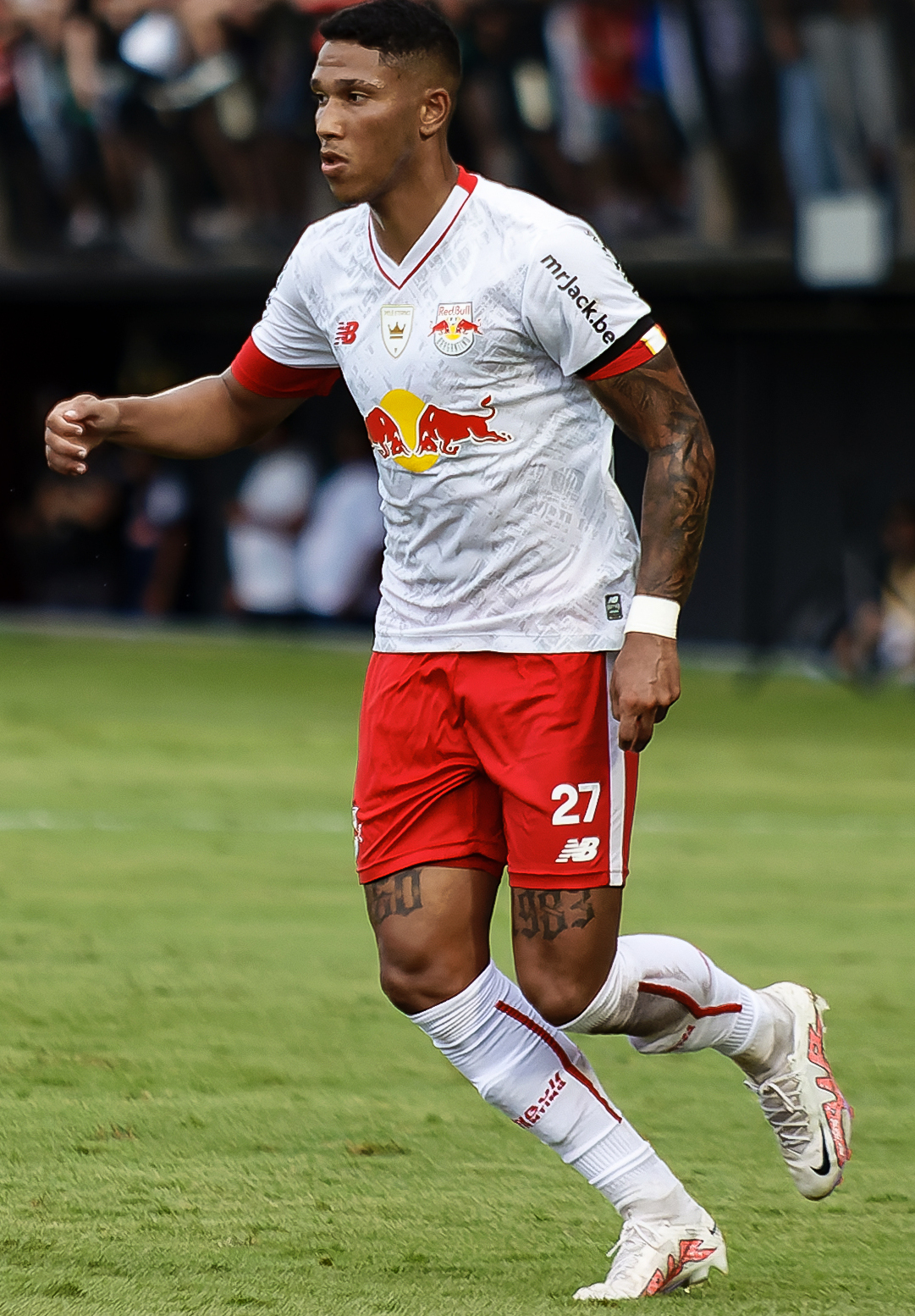
- Sorriso with Red Bull Bragantino in 2023

Personal information
- Full name: Marcos Vinicios Lopes Moura
- Date of birth: 23 February 2001 (age 25)
- Place of birth: Natal, Brazil
- Height: 1.76 m (5 ft 9 in)
- Position: Winger

Team information
- Current team: Famalicão
- Number: 7

Youth career
- 2014–2017: ABC
- 2017–2021: Juventude

Senior career*
Years	Team	Apps	(Gls)
2021–2022	Juventude	48	(4)
2022–2025	Red Bull Bragantino	77	(6)
2024–2025	→ Famalicão (loan)	44	(9)
2025–	Famalicão	40	(8)
- * Club domestic league appearances and goals as of 19 September 2026

Marcos Vinicios Lopes Moura (born 23 February 2001), known as Marcos Vinicios or Sorriso, is a Brazilian professional footballer who plays as a winger for Primeira Liga club Famalicão.

== Club career ==
=== Juventude ===
Born in Natal, Rio Grande do Norte, Sorriso joined Juventude's youth setup in 2017, from ABC. He was promoted to the main squad for the 2021 campaign, and made his senior debut on 1 March of that year, coming on as a late substitute for Yago in a 0–1 Campeonato Gaúcho away loss against Internacional.

On 5 March 2021, Sorriso renewed his contract with Ju for three seasons. He scored his first senior goal on 1 April, netting the game's only goal in a 1–0 home success over Aimoré.

Sorriso made his Série A debut on 29 May 2021, replacing Chico in a 2–2 away draw against Cuiabá.

=== Red Bull Bragantino ===
On 21 January 2022, Red Bull Bragantino announced the signing of Sorriso, on a five-year contract.

=== Famalicão ===
On 26 January 2024, Red Bull Bragantino sent Sorriso on loan to Portuguese Primeira Liga side Famalicão. In the summer of 2025, following one-and-a-half seasons on loan, he joined the club on a permanent basis, signing a four-year contract.

== Career statistics ==
As of match played 19 September 2026

Appearances and goals by club, season and competition
Club	Season	League			State league		National cup (Note: Includes Copa do Brasil, Taça de Portugal)		Continental		Total	
Club	Season	Division	Apps	Goals	Apps	Goals	Apps	Goals	Apps	Goals	Apps	Goals
Juventude	2021	Série A	36	2	12 (Note: Appearances in Campeonato Gaúcho)	2	2	0	—		50	4
Red Bull Bragantino	2022	Série A	31	2	9 (Note: Appearances in Campeonato Paulista)	0	1	0	5 (Note: Appearances in Copa Libertadores)	0	46	2
Red Bull Bragantino	2023	Série A	23	2	14	2	2	0	7 (Note: Appearances in Copa Sudamericana)	5	46	9
Red Bull Bragantino	Total		54	4	23	2	3	0	12	5	92	11
Famalicão (loan)	2023–24	Primeira Liga	15	1	—		0	0	—		15	1
Famalicão (loan)	2024–25	Primeira Liga	29	8	—		0	0	—		29	8
Famalicão (loan)	Total		44	9	—		0	0	—		44	9
Famalicão	2025–26	Primeira Liga	33	5	—		3	1	—		36	6
Famalicão	2026–27	Primeira Liga	7	2	—		0	0	—		7	2
Famalicão	Total		40	7	—		3	1	—		43	8
Career total			174	22	35	4	8	1	12	5	229	32

== Honours ==
Individual

- Primeira Liga Goal of the Month: February 2024,
