= Leandro Sanca =

Portuguese footballer

Personal information
- Full name: Leandro Mário Baldé Sanca
- Date of birth: 4 January 2000 (age 26)
- Place of birth: Lisbon, Portugal
- Height: 1.84 m (6 ft 0 in)
- Position: Winger

Team information
- Current team: Piast Gliwice
- Number: 11

Youth career
- 2010–2013: CR Foot
- 2013–2014: Real
- 2014–2018: Belenenses
- 2018–2020: Braga

Senior career*
Years	Team	Apps	(Gls)
2020–2021	Braga B	1	(0)
2020–2021	Braga	2	(0)
2020–2021	→ Académica (loan)	29	(2)
2021–2023	Spezia	4	(0)
2021–2022	→ Casa Pia (loan)	27	(3)
2023	→ Famalicão (loan)	14	(2)
2023–2025	Chaves	49	(1)
2025–	Piast Gliwice	41	(7)
- * Club domestic league appearances and goals as of 14:52, 6 September 2026 (UTC)

Leandro Mário Baldé Sanca (born 4 January 2000) is a Portuguese professional footballer who plays as a winger for Ekstraklasa club Piast Gliwice.

== Career ==
On 9 June 2020, Sanca signed a professional contract with Braga until 2024. Sanca made his professional debut with Braga in a 4–0 Primeira Liga win over C.D. Aves on 7 July 2020.

On 30 August 2021, he signed a three-year contract with Spezia in Italy and was at the same time loaned to Casa Pia for the 2021–22 season.

Upon his return from loan, Sanca made his Serie A debut for Spezia on 31 August 2022 against Juventus.

On 13 January 2023, he joined Famalicão on loan.

On 14 August 2023, Sanca signed with Chaves.

On 18 July 2025, Sanca moved to Polish Ekstraklasa club Piast Gliwice, signing a two-year contract with an extension option.

== Personal life ==
Born in Portugal, Sanca is of Bissau-Guinean descent.
