= Dalberson =

Brazilian footballer (born 1997)

Personal information
- Full name: Dalberson Ferreira do Amaral
- Date of birth: 13 January 1997 (age 29)
- Place of birth: Matozinhos, Brazil
- Height: 1.91 m (6 ft 3 in)
- Position: Goalkeeper

Team information
- Current team: Vila Nova (on loan from Guarani)
- Number: 29

Senior career*
Years	Team	Apps	(Gls)
2016	Boa	0	(0)
2017–2021	Joinville	32	(0)
2021	Brusque	10	(0)
2021–2022	Famalicão	3	(0)
2023	CSA	38	(0)
2024–2025	América Mineiro	18	(0)
2025–	Guarani	8	(0)
2026–	→ Vila Nova (loan)	2	(0)
- * Club domestic league appearances and goals as of 14 April 2026

Dalberson Ferreira do Amaral, known simply as Dalberson (born 13 January 1997) is a Brazilian football player. He plays for Vila Nova, on loan from Guarani.

== Club career ==
On 7 July 2021, he signed a three-year contract with Primeira Liga club Famalicão in Portugal.

He made his Primeira Liga debut for Famalicão on 18 September 2021 in a game against Marítimo and kept a clean sheet in a 0–0 tie.
