= Hernán de la Fuente =

Argentine footballer

Personal information
- Date of birth: 7 January 1997 (age 29)
- Place of birth: Buenos Aires, Argentina
- Height: 1.78 m (5 ft 10 in)
- Position: Right-back

Team information
- Current team: Instituto
- Number: 2

Youth career
- Vélez Sarsfield

Senior career*
Years	Team	Apps	(Gls)
2017–2021	Vélez Sarsfield	31	(1)
2021–2024	Famalicão	28	(0)
2023	→ Atlético Tucumán (loan)	10	(0)
2024–2026	Huracán	35	(1)
2026–	Instituto	2	(0)

International career
2019–2021	Argentina U23	13	(0)
- * Club domestic league appearances and goals as of 17:59, 10 May 2026 (UTC)

Hernán de la Fuente (born 7 January 1997) is an Argentine professional footballer who plays as a right-back for Primera División club Instituto.

== Club career ==
=== Vélez Sarsfield ===
Born in Buenos Aires, de La Fuente started off with Vélez Sarsfield. The first professional appearance of his career arrived midway through the 2017–18 Argentine Primera División campaign, when he played the full duration of a 1–0 loss to Huracán on 20 November 2017. In total, De la Fuente made seventeen appearances in his debut league season. He signed a new contract through to 2021 on 22 May 2018.

=== Famalicão ===
On 13 August 2021, de La Fuente signed a three-year contract with Portuguese Primeira Liga club Famalicão.

==== Loan to Atlético Tucumán ====
On 18 January 2023, Famalicão sent de La Fuente on a one-year loan to Argentine Primera División club Atlético Tucumán. At the end of the loan spell, he returned to Famalicão, but was not reintegrated into the first team.

=== Huracán ===
On 15 January 2024, de La Fuente left Famalicão and signed a one-year contract with Primera División club Huracán.

== Career statistics ==
As of 21 December 2025.

Appearances and goals by club, season and competition
Club	Season	League			Cup (Note: Includes Copa Argentina, Copa de la Superliga, and Taça de Portugal)		League Cup (Note: Includes Copa de la Liga Profesional and Taça da Liga)		Continental		Total	
Club	Season	Division	Apps	Goals	Apps	Goals	Apps	Goals	Apps	Goals	Apps	Goals
Vélez Sarsfield	2017–18	Primera División	17	0	0	0	—		-		17	0
Vélez Sarsfield	2018-19	Primera División	10	1	2	0	-		-		12	1
Vélez Sarsfield	2019-20	Primera División	4	0	2	1	9	1	7	0	22	2
Vélez Sarsfield	2020-21	Primera División	0	0	0	0	10	1	2	0	12	1
Vélez Sarsfield	Total		31	1	4	1	19	2	9	0	63	4
Famalicão	2021-22	Primeira Liga	19	0	2	0	2	0	-		23	0
Famalicão	2022-23	Primeira Liga	7	0	1	0	2	0	-		10	0
Famalicão	Total		26	0	3	0	4	0	-		33	0
Atlético Tucumán (loan)	2023	Primera División	10	0	0	0	11	0	-		21	0
Huracán	2024	Primera División	19	1	1	1	11	1	-		31	3
Huracán	2025	Primera División	16	0	0	0	0	0	-		16	0
Huracán	Total		35	1	1	1	11	1	-		47	3
Career total			92	2	8	2	34	3	9	0	143	7

== Honours ==
Argentina U23

- Pre-Olympic Tournament: 2020
