= Luiz Júnior (footballer, born 2001) =

Brazilian footballer (born 2001)

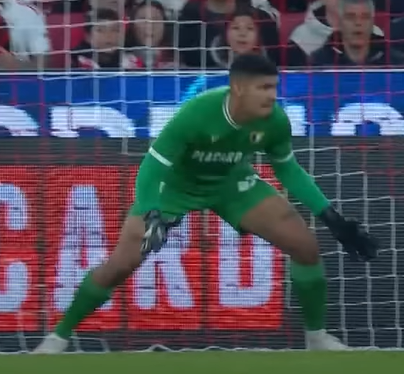
- Luiz Júnior playing for Famalicão in 2023

Personal information
- Full name: Luiz Lúcio Reis Júnior
- Date of birth: 14 January 2001 (age 25)
- Place of birth: Picos, Brazil
- Height: 1.92 m (6 ft 4 in)
- Position: Goalkeeper

Team information
- Current team: Villarreal
- Number: 1

Senior career*
| Years | Team | Apps | (Gls) |
| 2020–2024 | Famalicão | 121 | (0) |
| 2024– | Villarreal | 45 | (0) |
- * Club domestic league appearances and goals as of 12 April 2026

Luiz Lúcio Reis Júnior (born 14 January 2001), known as Júnior Reis or Luiz Júnior, is a Brazilian professional footballer who plays as a goalkeeper for La Liga club Villarreal.

== Club career ==
=== Early career ===
Born in Picos, Piauí, Júnior began his career with Clube Atlético Diadema. After playing for the under-17 squad, he made his senior debut on 9 April 2017, starting in a 3–2 Campeonato Paulista Segunda Divisão home win over Barcelona Capela.

In 2019, after playing for the youth sides of Mirassol Futebol Clube, Júnior moved to Portugal and joined F.C. Famalicão, initially for the under-19 squad.

=== Famalicão ===
After playing for the under-23 team, Júnior made his professional debut with Famalicão on 27 November 2020, in a 2–0 Primeira Liga loss to F.C. Paços de Ferreira. The following 25 February, after a further ten appearances for the main squad, he signed a permanent deal with the club until 2026.

On 7 November 2023, after establishing himself as an undisputed start, Júnior signed a new five-year contract with Famalicão.

=== Villarreal ===
On 20 August 2024, Júnior joined La Liga side Villarreal on a six-year contract.

== Career statistics ==
As of match played 12 April 2026

Appearances and goals by club, season and competition
| Club | Season | League | | | State league (Note: Includes Campeonato Paulista Segunda Divisão) | | National cup (Note: Includes Taça de Portugal, Copa del Rey) | | League cup (Note: Includes Taça da Liga) | | Continental | | Total | |
| Club | Season | Division | Apps | Goals | Apps | Goals | Apps | Goals | Apps | Goals | Apps | Goals | Apps | Goals |
|---|---|---|---|---|---|---|---|---|---|---|---|---|---|---|
| Diadema | 2017 | | — | | 1 | 0 | — | | — | | — | | 1 | 0 |
| Famalicão | 2020–21 | Primeira Liga | 23 | 0 | — | | 2 | 0 | — | | — | | 25 | 0 |
| Famalicão | 2021–22 | Primeira Liga | 31 | 0 | — | | 3 | 0 | 3 | 0 | — | | 37 | 0 |
| Famalicão | 2022–23 | Primeira Liga | 33 | 0 | — | | 6 | 0 | 3 | 0 | — | | 42 | 0 |
| Famalicão | 2023–24 | Primeira Liga | 33 | 0 | — | | 1 | 0 | 1 | 0 | — | | 35 | 0 |
| Famalicão | 2024–25 | Primeira Liga | 1 | 0 | — | | 0 | 0 | 0 | 0 | — | | 1 | 0 |
| Famalicão | Total | | 121 | 0 | — | | 12 | 0 | 7 | 0 | — | | 140 | 0 |
| Villarreal | 2024–25 | La Liga | 17 | 0 | — | | 2 | 0 | — | | — | | 19 | 0 |
| Villarreal | 2025–26 | La Liga | 28 | 0 | — | | 0 | 0 | — | | 5 (Note: Appearances in UEFA Champions League) | 0 | 33 | 0 |
| Villarreal | 2026–27 | La Liga | 0 | 0 | — | | 0 | 0 | — | | 0 | 0 | 0 | 0 |
| Villarreal | Total | | 45 | 0 | — | | 2 | 0 | — | | 5 | 0 | 52 | 0 |
| Career total | | | 166 | 0 | 1 | 0 | 14 | 0 | 7 | 0 | 5 | 0 | 193 | 0 |

== Honours ==
Individual

- Primeira Liga Goalkeeper of the Month: September 2023, October/November 2023
