= Afonso Rodrigues =

Portuguese footballer (born 2002)

Personal information
- Full name: Afonso de Oliveira Rodrigues
- Date of birth: 19 August 2002 (age 24)
- Place of birth: Braga, Portugal
- Height: 1.78 m (5 ft 10 in)
- Position: Winger

Team information
- Current team: Académica de Coimbra
- Number: 19

Youth career
- 2010–2011: EF Fernando Pires
- 2011–2015: Braga
- 2015–2023: Famalicão

Senior career*
| Years | Team | Apps | (Gls) |
| 2023–2025 | Famalicão | 11 | (1) |
| 2024 | → Paços de Ferreira (loan) | 8 | (3) |
| 2025 | → Paços de Ferreira (loan) | 5 | (0) |
| 2025–2026 | Tondela | 7 | (0) |
| 2026 | Egnatia | 14 | (1) |
| 2026– | Académica de Coimbra | 6 | (1) |
- * Club domestic league appearances and goals as of 11 September 2026

Afonso de Oliveira Rodrigues (born 19 August 2002) is a Portuguese professional footballer who plays as a winger for Liga Portugal 2 club Académica de Coimbra.

== Professional career ==
Rodrigues is a youth product of EF Fernando Pires, Braga and Famalicão. On 22 July 2021, he signed his first professional contract with Famalicão for 3 seasons. He was named the "Player of the Season" for the 2022–23 Liga Revelação, with 14 goals in 22 games. He made his professional debut with them in a 3–2 Taça da Liga loss to Belenenses on 23 July 2023. On his third ever Primeira Liga game, he scored his first senior goal in a 2–1 win over Braga on 11 August 2023. On 28 August 2023, he extended his contract with Famalicão until 2027.

On 25 January 2024, Famalicão sent Rodrigues on loan to Liga Portugal 2 side Paços de Ferreira until the end of the 2023–24 season. On 22 January 2025, Rodrigues was loaned to Paços de Ferreira once again, until the end of the 2024–25 season.

On 1 July 2025, Rodrigues signed a three-year contract with Primeira Liga club Tondela.

On 31 January 2026, after making just nine appearances for Tondela in all competitions, Rodrigues moved to Albania, joining Kategoria Superiore club Egnatia.

== Personal life ==
Rodrigues is the cousin of the Portugal international footballer Paulo Oliveira.

== Playing style ==
Rodrigues is a forward.

== Honours ==
=== Individual ===
- 2022–23 Liga Revelação player of the season
- 2022–23 Liga Revelação top scorer
