= Óscar Aranda =

Spanish footballer (born 2002)

Personal information
- Full name: Óscar Aranda Subiela
- Date of birth: 29 April 2002 (age 24)
- Place of birth: Granada, Spain
- Height: 1.81 m (5 ft 11 in)
- Position: Winger

Team information
- Current team: Famalicão
- Number: 11

Youth career
- 2008–2012: Huétor Vega
- 2012–2014: Granada
- 2014–2016: Málaga
- 2016–2018: Granada
- 2018–2021: Real Madrid

Senior career*
Years	Team	Apps	(Gls)
2021–2023	Real Madrid B	58	(10)
2023–	Famalicão	55	(10)

International career
2019	Spain U17	15	(1)
- * Club domestic league appearances and goals as of 25 May 2026

Óscar Aranda Subiela (born 29 April 2002) is a Spanish professional footballer who plays as a winger for Portuguese Primeira Liga club Famalicão. He is a youth international for Spain.

== Career statistics ==
=== Club ===
As of 13 May 2023.

Appearances and goals by club, season and competition
Club	Season	League			Other		Total	
Club	Season	Division	Apps	Goals	Apps	Goals	Apps	Goals
Real Madrid Castilla	2020–21	Segunda División B	1	0	0	0	1	0
Real Madrid Castilla	2021–22	Primera División RFEF	28	7	—		28	7
Real Madrid Castilla	2022–23	Primera Federación	25	3	—		25	3
Career total			54	10	0	0	54	10

== Honours ==
Real Madrid Juvenil A

- UEFA Youth League: 2019–20
