= Mirko Topić =

Serbian footballer (born 2001)

Personal information
- Full name: Mirko Topić
- Date of birth: 5 February 2001 (age 25)
- Place of birth: Novi Sad, FR Yugoslavia
- Height: 1.90 m (6 ft 3 in)
- Position: Defensive midfielder

Team information
- Current team: Norwich City
- Number: 22

Youth career
- Vojvodina

Senior career*
Years	Team	Apps	(Gls)
2019–2023	Vojvodina	100	(3)
2023–2025	Famalicão	65	(1)
2025–	Norwich City	14	(0)

International career^{‡}
2018–2019	Serbia U18	4	(0)
2019	Serbia U19	5	(1)
2020–	Serbia U21	10	(0)
2023–	Serbia	4	(0)
- * Club domestic league appearances and goals as of 09:22, 9 November 2025 (UTC) ‡ National team caps and goals as of 23 March 2025

Mirko Topić (Serbian Cyrillic: Мирко Топић; born 5 February 2001) is a Serbian professional footballer who plays as a defensive midfielder for EFL Championship club Norwich City and the Serbia national team.

== Career ==
On 12 May 2019, Topić made his first team debut, replacing Nemanja Milojević in 64th minute, in 2:1 home loss to Partizan. On 29 June 2023, Topić signed a four-year contract with the Primeira Liga side Famalicão.

On 25 January 2023, Topić debuted for Serbia national team as a starter in a 2–1 friendly victory against United States.

On 3 August 2025, Topić signed for EFL Championship club Norwich City for an initial fee of £3m. He signed a four-year contract with a club option for a further year. In November 2025, it was announced that Topić would miss the remainder of the season due to undergoing surgery on a damaged ACL.

== Career statistics ==
=== Club ===
As of 30 June 2023

Appearances and goals by club, season and competition
Club	Season	League			Cup		Continental		Other		Total	
Club	Season	Division	Apps	Goals	Apps	Goals	Apps	Goals	Apps	Goals	Apps	Goals
Vojvodina	2018–19	Serbian SuperLiga	2	0	0	0	—		—		2	0
Vojvodina	2019–20	Serbian SuperLiga	17	1	2	0	—		—		19	1
Vojvodina	2020–21	Serbian SuperLiga	15	0	1	0	0	0	—		16	0
Vojvodina	2021–22	Serbian SuperLiga	31	2	2	1	4	0	—		37	3
Vojvodina	2022–23	Serbian SuperLiga	35	0	4	0	—		—		39	0
Vojvodina	Total		100	3	9	1	4	0	—		113	4
Career total			100	3	9	1	4	0	—		113	4

=== International ===
As of 23 March 2025

Appearances and goals by national team and year
National team	Year	Apps	Goals
Serbia	2023	1	0
Serbia	2024	1	0
Serbia	2025	2	0
Total		4	0

== Honours ==
Vojvodina

- Serbian Cup: 2019–20
