= Ivan Zlobin =

Russian footballer (born 1997)

Personal information
- Full name: Ivan Sergeyevich Zlobin
- Date of birth: 7 March 1997 (age 29)
- Place of birth: Tyumen, Russia
- Height: 1.91 m (6 ft 3 in)
- Position: Goalkeeper

Team information
- Current team: Famalicão
- Number: 1

Youth career
- 2003–2009: Tyumen
- 2009–2012: Konoplyov football academy
- 2012–2015: CSKA Moscow
- 2015: União Leiria
- 2016: → Benfica (loan)

Senior career*
Years	Team	Apps	(Gls)
2016–2020	Benfica B	64	(0)
2019–2020	Benfica	0	(0)
2020–	Famalicão	23	(0)

International career
2013	Russia U16	2	(0)
2014	Russia U17	8	(0)
2013	Russia U18	1	(0)
- * Club domestic league appearances and goals as of 3 June 2025

Ivan Sergeyevich Zlobin (Russian: Иван Сергеевич Злобин; born 7 March 1997) is a Russian professional footballer who plays as a goalkeeper for and captains Primeira Liga club Famalicão.

== Club career ==
=== Early career ===
Born in Tyumen in Siberia, Zlobin began playing at hometown club FC Tyumen from the age of six. After impressing in a youth tournament at 12, he was approached by the Konoplyov football academy, Lokomotiv Moscow and Krasnodar, and opted for the first of those. When Roman Abramovich withdrew funding from the Tolyatti-based centre, Zlobin moved to CSKA Moscow. Though second choice to Ilya Pomazun, he won all five league games he played (conceding only one goal) and defeated Bayern Munich in the UEFA Youth League. Injuries removed him from play in early 2015.

Zlobin joined Portuguese club União de Leiria in October 2015, aged 18. He was one of several Eastern European players transferred to the club by agent and investor Alexander Tolstikov.

=== Benfica ===
In January 2016, Zlobin was loaned out to Benfica, where he played for their under-19 team before signing a permanent five-year contract on 25 June that year. On 28 November, he made his professional debut with the reserve team as a starter in a 1–0 home loss to Fafe in LigaPro. In his first season, he was second-choice to André Ferreira, but still trained with the first team, where manager Rui Vitória likened him to Lev Yashin.

On 29 January 2019, Zlobin was called to the bench for Benfica's 5–1 home Primeira Liga win over Boavista, as regular back-up Mile Svilar was injured. Three days later he was promoted to the club's main team, alongside three other reserve players. He made his first-team debut in a goalless home draw to Vitória de Guimarães in the Taça da Liga on 25 September.

=== Famalicão ===
Zlobin signed for fellow top-flight club Famalicão on 22 August 2020, on a five-year deal. He made his debut in the season opener on 18 September, a 5–1 home loss to his previous club. Brazilian Luiz Júnior then took his place as the starting goalkeeper.

On 26 February 2022, two days after the Russian invasion of Ukraine, Zlobin posed for photographs at the Estádio Municipal 22 de Junho in Vila Nova de Famalicão with a Ukrainian fan and the flag of Ukraine.

== Honours ==
Benfica

- Supertaça Cândido de Oliveira: 2019
