= Chiquinho (footballer, born 2000) =

Portuguese footballer

Personal information
- Full name: Francisco Jorge Tavares Oliveira
- Date of birth: 5 February 2000 (age 26)
- Place of birth: Cascais, Portugal
- Height: 1.79 m (5 ft 10 in)
- Position: Winger

Team information
- Current team: Alverca
- Number: 10

Youth career
- 2008–2009: AFD Torre
- 2009–2019: Sporting CP
- 2017–2018: → Estoril (loan)
- 2018–2019: → Tondela (loan)

Senior career*
Years	Team	Apps	(Gls)
2019–2022	Estoril	36	(4)
2022–2025	Wolverhampton Wanderers	9	(0)
2023	→ Stoke City (loan)	3	(0)
2023–2024	→ Famalicão (loan)	27	(5)
2024–2025	→ Mallorca (loan)	8	(0)
2025–	Alverca	29	(4)

International career
2019	Portugal U20	4	(0)
2021	Portugal U21	1	(0)
- * Club domestic league appearances and goals as of 19:58, 7 November 2026 (UTC)

Francisco Jorge Tavares Oliveira (born 5 February 2000), known as Chiquinho, is a Portuguese professional footballer who plays as a winger for Primeira Liga club Alverca.

== Club career ==
=== Estoril ===
Born in Cascais, Lisbon District, Chiquinho spent nearly one decade at the youth system of local Sporting CP. In 2019 he signed with neighbouring G.D. Estoril Praia, making his Liga Portugal 2 debut on 18 January 2020 in a 1–0 home win against Académica de Coimbra where he came on as a 60th-minute substitute. He scored his first goal as a professional the following month, in the 4–1 victory over Casa Pia A.C. also at the Estádio António Coimbra da Mota.

In the 2020–21 season, Chiquinho played 13 games to help the club return to the Primeira Liga as champions. He made his first appearance in the competition on 7 August 2021, starting a 2–0 away defeat of F.C. Arouca. His first goal came later that month, when he closed the 2–1 home win over C.S. Marítimo.

=== Wolverhampton Wanderers ===
On 17 January 2022, Chiquinho joined Wolverhampton Wanderers on a three-and-a-half-year contract, for a reported fee of £2.9 million that could potentially rise to £4.2 million with add-ons. He made his debut on 5 February, which coincidentally was his 22nd birthday, replacing Leander Dendoncker late into a 1–0 home loss against Norwich City in the round of 32 of the FA Cup. His Premier League bow took place five days later, against Arsenal and again off the bench, in another defeat at Molineux Stadium by that scoreline. He claimed his first assist on 10 March, setting up Rúben Neves for the fourth goal in the 4–0 home rout of Watford.

Chiquinho suffered a serious knee injury in a pre-season friendly with Burnley in July 2022. In summer 2023, he joined EFL Championship side Stoke City on loan for the season. However, he was recalled after only playing four matches, and shortly after moved to F.C. Famalicão in his country's top division also on loan.

On 30 August 2024, Chiquinho moved to La Liga club RCD Mallorca on a one-year loan.

=== Alverca ===
Chiquinho returned to the Portuguese top division on 9 July 2025, signing a three-year deal with newly promoted F.C. Alverca. Shortly after his arrival, a calf injury sidelined him for several months.

== International career ==
Chiquinho made his Portugal under-21 debut on 12 November 2021, replacing Fábio Silva in the second half of the 1–0 win in Cyprus in the 2023 UEFA European Championship qualifiers.

== Personal life ==
Chiquinho's older brother, Carlos, was also a footballer and a winger.

== Career statistics ==
As of match played 17 May 2024

Appearances and goals by club, season and competition
Club	Season	League			National Cup		League Cup		Other		Total	
Club	Season	Division	Apps	Goals	Apps	Goals	Apps	Goals	Apps	Goals	Apps	Goals
Estoril	2019–20	Liga Portugal 2	8	1	0	0	0	0	—		8	1
Estoril	2020–21	Liga Portugal 2	13	0	1	1	1	0	—		15	1
Estoril	2021–22	Primeira Liga	15	3	3	1	2	0	—		20	4
Estoril	Total		36	4	4	2	3	0	0	0	43	6
Wolverhampton Wanderers	2021–22	Premier League	8	0	1	0	—		—		9	0
Wolverhampton Wanderers	2022–23	Premier League	0	0	0	0	0	0	—		0	0
Wolverhampton Wanderers	2023–24	Premier League	0	0	0	0	0	0	—		0	0
Wolverhampton Wanderers	Total		8	0	1	0	0	0	0	0	9	0
Stoke City (loan)	2023–24	EFL Championship	3	0	0	0	1	0	—		4	0
Famalicão (loan)	2023–24	Primeira Liga	27	5	0	0	0	0	0	0	27	5
Career total			74	9	5	2	4	0	0	0	83	11

== Honours ==
Estoril

- Liga Portugal 2: 2020–21
