= Justin de Haas =

Dutch footballer (born 2000)

Personal information
- Full name: Justin de Haas
- Date of birth: 1 February 2000 (age 26)
- Place of birth: Zaandam, Netherlands
- Height: 1.94 m (6 ft 4 in)
- Positions: Centre-back; left-back

Team information
- Current team: Valencia
- Number: 12

Youth career
- AZ Alkmaar

Senior career*
Years	Team	Apps	(Gls)
2018–2019	Jong AZ	6	(0)
2019–2021	Jong PSV	25	(1)
2021	→ Dinamo Zagreb II (loan)	15	(0)
2021–2023	Lokomotiva Zagreb	41	(0)
2023–2026	Famalicão	82	(8)
2026–	Valencia	2	(0)

International career
2017	Netherlands U17	5	(0)
2017-2018	Netherlands U18	5	(0)
- * Club domestic league appearances and goals as of 18 September 2026

Justin de Haas (born 1 February 2000) is a Dutch footballer who plays as a centre-back or left-back for La Liga club Valencia.

== Club career ==
After representing AZ Alkmaar as a youth, de Haas made his senior debut with Jong AZ in 2018, but moved to Jong PSV in the following year. In January 2021, he was loaned to Dinamo Zagreb, being initially assigned to the B-team.

In July 2021, de Haas signed a contract with Lokomotiva Zagreb also in Croatia. On 3 July 2023, he agreed to a three-year deal with Primeira Liga side Famalicão.

On 1 July 2026, de Haas signed a four-year contract with La Liga side Valencia, becoming the 8th Dutch player in history at the club.

== International career ==
De Haas played 5 games for the Netherlands national under-17 football team and 5 for the U18s.

== Honours ==
Individual

- Primeira Liga Defender of the Month: August 2025
