= João Neto (footballer, born May 2003) =

Brazilian footballer

Personal information
- Full name: João Roberto Rota Neto
- Date of birth: 21 May 2003 (age 23)
- Place of birth: Taubaté, Brazil
- Height: 1.79 m (5 ft 10 in)
- Position: Attacking midfielder

Team information
- Current team: Paços de Ferreira (on loan from Red Bull Bragantino)
- Number: 10

Youth career
- 2014: Corinthians
- 2014–2019: Braga
- 2015–2016: → Palmeiras FC (loan)
- 2018–2019: → Palmeiras FC (loan)
- 2019–2020: Famalicão

Senior career*
Years	Team	Apps	(Gls)
2020–2024	Famalicão	8	(0)
2021–2023	→ Benfica B (loan)	12	(0)
2024–	Red Bull Bragantino	0	(0)
2026–	→ Paços de Ferreira (loan)	3	(0)
- * Club domestic league appearances and goals as of 13 September 2026

João Roberto Rota Neto (born 21 May 2003) is a Brazilian professional footballer who plays as an attacking midfielder for Portuguese Liga 3 club Paços de Ferreira on loan from Red Bull Bragantino.

== Professional career ==
Neto made his professional debut with Famalicão in a 2–2 Primeira Liga tie with Sporting CP on 5 December 2020. At 17 years and 6 months old, he was the youngest ever player to make his professional debut with Famalicão.

On 1 September 2021, he joined Benfica B on loan. Upon returning in 2023, he was not used in the main squad, and returned to his home country with Red Bull Bragantino on a four-year contract on 2 September 2024.

== Honours ==
Benfica

- UEFA Youth League: 2021–22
