= Théo Fonseca =

Portuguese footballer (born 2000)

Personal information
- Full name: Théo Luis Fonseca
- Date of birth: 11 June 2000 (age 26)
- Place of birth: Ermont, France
- Height: 1.78 m (5 ft 10 in)
- Position: Winger

Team information
- Current team: Oliveirense
- Number: 95

Youth career
- 2017–2018: Nancy
- 2018–2020: Vitória Guimarães

Senior career*
Years	Team	Apps	(Gls)
2020–2022	Felgueiras	47	(16)
2022–2024	Famalicão	19	(2)
2024–2025	Felgueiras	21	(0)
2025–2026	Fafe	26	(1)
2026–	Oliveirense	5	(0)

International career^{‡}
2018	Portugal U18	4	(0)
- * Club domestic league appearances and goals as of 12 September 2026 ‡ National team caps and goals as of 16:59, 16 December 2022 (UTC)

Théo Luis Fonseca (born 11 June 2000) is a professional footballer who plays as a winger for Liga 3 club Oliveirense. Born in France, he is a youth international for Portugal.

== Club career ==
Fonseca is a youth product of the French club Nancy and the Portuguese club Vitória Guimarães. He transferred to Felgueiras in the summer of 2020, and began his senior career with them in the Campeonato de Portugal that season. He was named player of the season in the 2021–22 season in the Campeonato de Portugal, which earned him a transfer to the Primeira Liga club Famalicão on 6 June 2022. He made his professional debut with Famalicão as a late substitute in a 3–0 Primeira Liga loss to Braga on 12 August 2022.

== International career ==
Born in France, Fonseca is of Portuguese descent through his father. He represented the Portugal U18s in 2018.

== Honours ==
Individual

- Primeira Liga Goal of the Month: December 2023
