= Estádio Municipal 22 de Junho =

Stadium in Famalicão, Portugal

Estádio Municipal de Famalicão
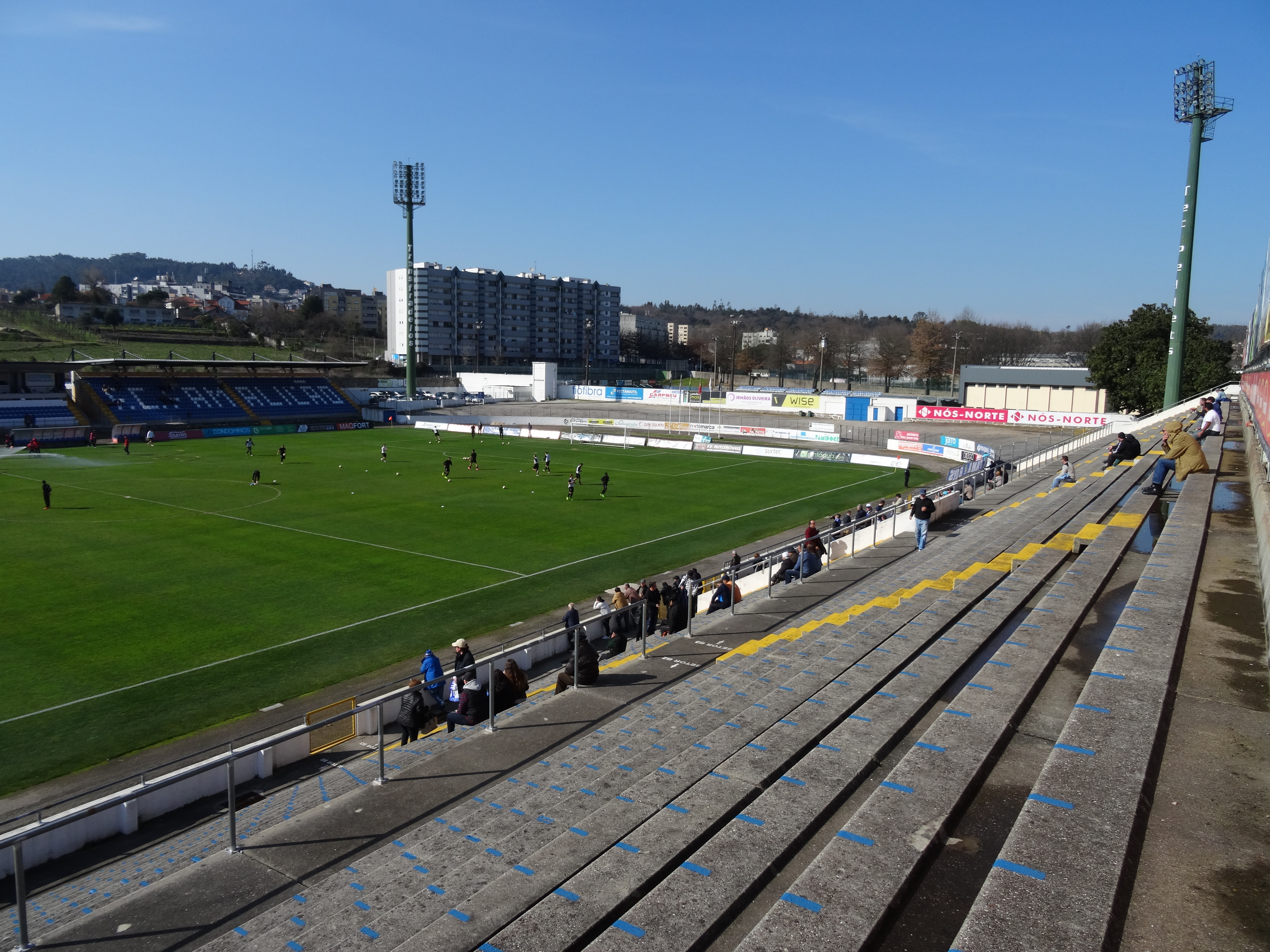
- Interactive map of Estádio Municipal de Famalicão
- Former names: Campo dos Bargos; Estádio Municipal 22 de Junho
- Location: Vila Nova de Famalicão
- Coordinates: 41°24′05″N 8°31′21″W
- Owner: Vila Nova de Famalicão Municipality
- Capacity: 5,186
- Record attendance: 5,226 (28 April 2019); F.C. Famalicão 4–1 Vitória S.C. B

Construction
- Opened: 1952

Tenant
- FC Famalicão

The Estádio Municipal de Famalicão is a multi-use stadium in Vila Nova de Famalicão, Portugal. It is currently used mostly for football matches and is the home stadium of FC Famalicão who currently compete in the Primeira Liga, the top tier of Portuguese football. The stadium is able to hold 5,186 people.

The municipality is planning expansion works on the stadium to increase its capacity to 10,000 people and a general improvement on the conditions of the stadium.
