= 2024–25 S.C. Farense season =

S.C. Farense
2024–25 season
- Stadium: Estádio de São Luís
- Primeira Liga: 18th
- Taça de Portugal: 2024–25 Taça de Portugal
- Taça da Liga: 2024–25 Taça da Liga
- Average home league attendance: 7,165

The 2024–25 season is S.C. Farense's 108th season in existence and second one back in the Primeira Liga. They are also competing in the Taça de Portugal and Taça da Liga.

== Players ==
=== First-team squad ===
As of 4 September 2024

Note: Flags indicate national team as defined under FIFA eligibility rules; some limited exceptions apply. Players may hold more than one non-FIFA nationality.

No.	Pos.	Nation	Player
1	GK	BRA	Kaique Pereira (on loan from Palmeiras)
2	DF	BRA	Paulo Victor
3	DF	ESP	Marco Moreno
4	DF	POR	Artur Jorge
6	MF	BRA	Neto
7	FW	GBS	Elves Baldé
8	MF	POR	Rafael Barbosa
9	FW	POR	Tomané
10	MF	COL	Jhon Velásquez
11	FW	ESP	Álex Bermejo
12	DF	BRA	Talys
14	FW	ESP	Darío Poveda
16	MF	POR	Geovanny Almeida
17	FW	POR	Cuba
19	FW	ESP	Álex Millán
21	MF	POR	Filipe Soares (on loan to PAOK)

No.	Pos.	Nation	Player
22	GK	POR	Miguel Carvalho
23	GK	ESP	Lucas Cañizares
28	DF	BRA	Pastor
29	MF	BRA	Cláudio Falcão
31	DF	BRA	Poloni
33	GK	POR	Ricardo Velho (vice-captain)
34	DF	BRA	Raul Silva
44	DF	BRA	Lucas Áfrico
47	GK	BRA	Kauan
50	MF	POR	André Seruca
70	DF	CPV	Rivaldo Morais
71	FW	POR	Jaime Pinto
77	FW	POR	Marco Matias (captain)
79	FW	FRA	Mehdi Merghem
93	MF	POR	Miguel Menino

=== Other players under contract ===
Note: Flags indicate national team as defined under FIFA eligibility rules; some limited exceptions apply. Players may hold more than one non-FIFA nationality.

No.	Pos.	Nation	Player

=== Out on loan ===
Note: Flags indicate national team as defined under FIFA eligibility rules; some limited exceptions apply. Players may hold more than one non-FIFA nationality.

No.	Pos.	Nation	Player
—	DF	ESP	Fran Delgado (at AD Ceuta until 30 June 2025)

== Transfers ==
=== In ===
Pos.	Player	Transferred from	Fee	Date	Source
GK	(Brazil) Kaique Pereira	(Brazil) Palmeiras	Loan	1 July 2024	
DF	(Spain) Marco Moreno	(Spain) Atlético Madrid B	Undisclosed	1 July 2024	
DF	(Brazil) Raul Silva	(Romania) Universitatea Craiova	Free	1 July 2024	
DF	(Brazil) Lucas Áfrico	(Azerbaijan) Qabala	Free	1 July 2024	
MF	(Brazil) Neto	(Portugal) Casa Pia	Free	1 July 2024	
FW	(Spain) Álex Bermejo	(Spain) Burgos	Free	1 July 2024	
MF	(Portugal) Filipe Soares	(Greece) PAOK	Loan	9 July 2024	
FW	(Portugal) Tomané	(Cyprus) APOEL FC	Free	17 July 2024	
DF	(Brazil) Pastor	(Brazil) Ferroviária	Undisclosed	1 August 2024	
GK	(Spain) Lucas Cañizares	(Spain) Real Madrid B	Free	9 August 2024	
MF	(Portugal) Miguel Menino	(Portugal) Sporting B	Free	19 August 2024	
FW	(Spain) Álex Millán	(Spain) Real Oviedo	Free	20 August 2024	
FW	(Portugal) Jaime Pinto	(Portugal) Oliveirense	Free	24 August 2024	
DF	(Brazil) Poloni	(Brazil) Eldense	Free	30 August 2024	
DF	(Brazil) Paulo Victor	(Brazil) Internacional	Free	2 September 2024	
FW	(France) Mehdi Merghem	(France) Guingamp	Undisclosed	2 September 2024	

=== Out ===
Pos.	Player	Transferred to	Fee	Date	Source
DF	(Portugal) Gonçalo Silva	(Armenia) FC Noah	Free	1 July 2024	
DF	(Malta) Zach Muscat		Released	1 July 2024	
FW	(Portugal) Rui Costa	(Kazakhstan) Tobol	Free	1 July 2024	
FW	(Cape Verde) Zé Luís		Released	1 July 2024	
MF	(Brazil) Mattheus	(United Arab Emirates) Khor Fakkan	Free	5 July 2024	
DF	(Spain) Fran Delgado	(Spain) AD Ceuta	Loan	11 July 2024	
MF	(Brazil) Vítor Gonçalves	(Portugal) Mafra	Free	14 July 2024	
MF	(Brazil) Fabrício Isidoro	(Bahrain) Al-Muharraq	Free	17 July 2024	
FW	(Brazil) Bruno Duarte	(Serbia) Red Star Belgrade	€2,000,000	17 July 2024	
FW	(Brazil) Maxuel	(Indonesia) Madura United	Free	17 July 2024	
DF	(Brazil) Igor Rossi	(Kuwait) Qadsia	Free	20 July 2024	
MF	(Argentina) Facundo Cáseres	(Portugal) Gil Vicente	Free	23 July 2024	
DF	(Portugal) Talocha	(Portugal) Tondela	Free	21 August 2024	
FW	(Portugal) Cristian Ponde	(Portugal) Marítimo	Free	29 August 2024	
FW	(Algeria) Mohamed Belloumi	(England) Hull City	€5,500,000	30 August 2024	
GK	(Brazil) Luiz Felipe		Released	1 September 2024	

== Pre-season and friendlies ==
Win Draw Loss Fixtures

17 July 2024	Marítimo	0-1	Farense	Faro/Loulé
11:00 WET (UTC±0)				Stadium: Estádio Algarve; Referee:

20 July 2024	Farense	1-1	Al Nassr	Faro
21:00 WET (UTC±0)	Rafael Barbosa 37' (pen.)		Talisca 33'	Stadium: Estádio de São Luís; Referee:

31 July 2024	Farense	3-1	Al-Ittihad	Faro
20:00 WET (UTC±0)	Darío Poveda 49' (pen.); Tomané 57' (red card) 85'; Neto (yellow card) 60'; Marco Matias 81'; Artur Jorge (yellow card) 86'		Karim Benzema 12'; Farhah Al-Shamrani (red card) 86'	Stadium: Estádio de São Luís; Referee:

2 August 2024	Portimonense	0-0	Farense	Portimão
21:00 WET (UTC±0)				Stadium: Estádio Municipal; Referee:

== Competitions ==
=== Overall record ===
Competition	First match	Last match	Starting round	Record							
Competition	First match	Last match	Starting round	Pld	W	D	L	GF	GA	GD	Win %
Primeira Liga	11 August 2024	17 May 2025	Matchday 1	15	3	3	9	9	21	−12	20.00
Taça de Portugal	October 2024		Third round	2	2	0	0	6	3	+3	100.00
Taça da Liga	2024		First round					—			
Total				17	5	3	9	15	24	−9	29.41

Last updated: 20 December 2024
Source: Soccerway

=== Primeira Liga ===
==== League table ====
Pos	Team	Pld	W	D	L	GF	GA	GD	Pts	Qualification or relegation
14	Nacional	34	9	7	18	32	50	−18	34	
15	Estrela da Amadora	34	7	8	19	24	50	−26	29	
16	AVS (O)	34	5	12	17	25	60	−35	27 (Note: Head to head points: AVS 4, Farense 1.)	Qualification for the relegation play-offs
17	Farense (R)	34	6	9	19	25	46	−21	27	Relegation to Liga Portugal 2
18	Boavista (D, R)	34	6	6	22	24	59	−35	24	Administrative relegation to Porto Football Association

Source: Liga Portugal
Rules for classification: 1) Points; 2) Head-to-head points; 3) Head-to-head goal difference; 4) Goal difference; 5) Matches won; 6) Goals scored; 7) Play-off.
(D) Disqualified; (O) Play-off winners; (R) Relegated

==== Results summary ====
Overall								Home						Away					
Pld	W	D	L	GF	GA	GD	Pts	W	D	L	GF	GA	GD	W	D	L	GF	GA	GD
14	2	3	9	7	20	−13	9	2	0	5	4	11	−7	0	3	4	3	9	−6

Last updated: 20 December 2024.
Source: Superliga

==== Results by round ====
Round	1	2	3	4	5	6	7	8	9	10	11	12	13	14	15	16	17	18	19	20	21	22	23	24	25	26	27	28	29	30	31	32	33	34
Ground	H	A	H	A	A	H	A	H	A	H	A	H	A	H	A	H	A	A	H	A	H	H	A	H	A	H	A	H	A	H	A	H	A	H
Result	L	L	L	L	L	L	D	W	L	L	D	W	D	L	W																			
Position	12	15	18	18	18	18	18	18	18	18	18	17	17	18	16																			

Updated to match(es) played on 20 December 2024. Source: Superliga
A = Away; H = Home; W = Win; D = Draw; L = Loss

==== Matches ====
The league fixtures were unveiled on 7 July 2024.

11 August 2024 1	Farense	1-2	Moreirense	Faro
18:00 WET (UTC±0)	Álex Bermejo 66'		Maracás 7'; Sidnei Tavares (yellow card) 22' (yellow-red card) 64'; Luis Asué 79'; Kewin (yellow card) 90+6'; Alan (yellow card) 90+7'	Stadium: Estádio de São Luís; Attendance: 5,255; Referee: (Portugal) Miguel Nogueira

17 August 2024 2	Rio Ave	1-0	Farense	Vila do Conde
15:30 WET (UTC±0)	Patrick William 32'; Gualter Pires (red card) 45'; Luís Freire (yellow card) 90+4'		Neto (yellow card) 39'; José Luis Domingos (red card) 45'; João Rodrigues (yellow card) 90+4'	Stadium: Estádio dos Arcos; Attendance: 3,177; Referee: (Portugal) Carlos Macedo

23 August 2024 3	Farense	0-5	Sporting	Faro/Loulé
20:15 WET (UTC±0)	Cláudio Falcão (yellow card) 14'; Tomané (yellow card) 50'; Marco Moreno (yellow card) 51'; Lucas Áfrico (yellow card) 84'		Daniel Bragança (yellow card) 10'; Gyökeres 27', 41', 66' (pen.); Lucas Áfrico 69' (o.g.); Edwards 81'	Stadium: Estádio Algarve; Attendance: 17,793; Referee: (Portugal) Tiago Martins

1 September 2024 4	Nacional	2-0	Farense	Funchal
15:30 WET (UTC±0)	Daniel Penha 43'; Luís Esteves (yellow card) 67'; Adrián Butzke (yellow card) 89'; Isaac 90+2' (yellow card) 90+2'		Artur Jorge (yellow card) 51'; Cláudio Falcão (yellow card) 63'; Rafael Barbosa (yellow card) 67'	Stadium: Estádio da Madeira; Attendance: 2,038; Referee: (Portugal) Cláudio Pereira

15 September 2024 5	Porto	2-1	Farense	Porto
15:30 WET (UTC±0)	Galeno 48' (pen.) (yellow card) 89'; Samu Omorodion 75'; Nico González (yellow card) 90+5'		Artur Jorge (yellow card) 45+1'; Tomané 51'; Raul Silva (yellow card) 82'; Neto (yellow card) 90+5'	Stadium: Estádio do Dragão; Attendance: 47,013; Referee: (Portugal) Nuno Almeida

22 September 2024 6	Farense	0-1	Arouca	Faro
18:00 WET (UTC±0)	Cláudio Falcão (yellow card) 44'		Alfonso Trezza 45+1'; Taichi Fukui (yellow card) 69'; Ivo Rodrigues (yellow card) 77'; Jason (yellow card) 90+3'; Tiago Esgaio (yellow card) 90+5'	Stadium: Estádio de São Luís; Attendance: 5,057; Referee: (Portugal) Luís Godinho

30 September 2024 7	AVS	0-0	Farense	Vila das Aves
20:15 WET (UTC±0)	Jaume Grau (yellow card) 21'; Gustavo Assunção (yellow card) 22'; Vasco Lopes (yellow card) 64'; Lucas Piazon (yellow card) 71'		Lucas Áfrico (yellow card) 40'; Artur Jorge (yellow card) 45'; Rafael Barbosa (yellow card) 65'	Stadium: Estádio do CD Aves; Attendance: 1,615; Referee: (Portugal) Fábio Veríssimo

6 October 2024 8	Farense	1-0	Estoril	Faro
15:30 WET (UTC±0)	Álex Bermejo (yellow card) 22'; Neto (yellow card) 42'; Raul Silva (yellow card) 77'; Artur Jorge (yellow card) 90'; Raul Silva 90+5'		Kévin Boma (yellow card) 9'; Yanis Begraoui 15'; Michel (yellow card) 78'; Jandro Orellana (yellow card) 80'	Stadium: Estádio de São Luís; Attendance: 4,921; Referee: (Portugal) António Nobre

27 October 2024 9	Braga	2-0	Farense	Braga
22.30 WET (UTC±0)	Gharbi 41'; El Ouazzani 70'; Niakaté (yellow card) 90+2'		Millán (yellow card) 56'; Neto (yellow card) 59'	Stadium: Estádio Municipal de Braga; Attendance: 12.841; Referee: João Gonçalves

3 November 2024 10	Farense	1-2	Benfica	Faro
01:00 WET (UTC±0)	Poveda 19'; Neto (yellow card) 84'		Carreras 21'; Pavlidis 54'	Stadium: Estádio Algarve; Attendance: 12.649; Referee: Cláudio Pereira

9 November 2024 11	Casa Pia	1-1	Farense	Rio Maior
15.30 WET (UTC±0)	Cassiano 32' (pen.)	Report	Baldé 7'; Sandro (yellow card) 42'	Stadium: Estádio Municipal de Rio Maior; Attendance: 1.202; Referee: Carlos Macedo

30 November 2024 12	Farense	1-0	Estrela Amadora	Faro
03.15 WET (UTC±0)	Poveda 23'; Áfrico (yellow card) 63'; Merghem (yellow card) 74'; Menino (yellow card) 81'; Bermejo (yellow card) 84'		Ruiz (yellow card) 19'; Jesus (yellow card) 28'	Stadium: Estádio de São Luís; Attendance: 5.178; Referee: João Pinheiro

8 December 2024 13	Boavista	1-1	Farense	Porto
22.30 WET (UTC±0)	Vukotić (yellow card) 86' (yellow-red card) 90+4'; Reisinho 90+5' (pen.); Agra (yellow card) 90+7'		Falcão (yellow card) 47' (yellow-red card) 90+4'; Matias 52'; Áfrico (yellow card) 89'; Victor (yellow card) 90+7'	Stadium: Estádio do Bessa Século XXI; Attendance: 3.845; Referee: David Silva

14 December 2024 14	Farense	0-1	Gil Vicente	Faro
22:30 WET (UTC±0)	Silva (yellow card) 50'; Neto (yellow card) 69'; Soares (yellow card) 90+10'		Josué Sá (yellow card) 20'; Áfrico 47' (o.g.); García (yellow card) 90+11'; Cauê (red card) 90+13'	Stadium: Estádio de São Luís; Referee: Bruno José Costa

21 December 2024 15	Famalicão	1-2	Farense	Famalicão
15:30 WET (UTC±0)	Gil Dias (yellow card) 14'; Aranda 80' (pen.), (yellow card) 83'; Gustavo Sá (yellow card) 88'	Report	Neto (yellow card) 7'; Matias 30'; Áfrico (yellow card) 34'; Menino 47', (yellow card) 85'; Baldé (yellow card) 52'; Poveda (yellow card) 64'; Pastor (yellow card) 82'	Stadium: Estádio Municipal de Famalicão; Referee: Miguel Nogueira

29 December 2024 16	Farense	-	Vitória Guimarães	Faro
15:30 WET (UTC±0)		Report		Stadium: Estádio de São Luís

=== Taça de Portugal ===
20 October 2024 Third round	Sanjoanense	2-4	Farense	Madeira
20.00	Pisco 51', (yellow card) 54'; Santos 73'; Fonseca (yellow card) 62'; Maneta (yellow card) 82'; Pinto (yellow card) 90'		Bermejo 10', 47'; Áfrico (yellow card) 11'; Neto (yellow card) 33'; Jorge (yellow card) 64'; Maneta 70' (o.g.); Silva (yellow card) 65', (goal) 83'; Poloni (yellow card) 90'	Stadium: Estádio Conde Dias Garcia; Referee: Bruno Vieira

23 November 2024 Fourth round	Arouca	1-2	Farense	Arouca
22.00	Trezza 16'; Simão (yellow card) 28'; Araújo (yellow card) 90+2'; Puche (yellow card) 90+6'		Poveda 7'; Baldé 32'; Victor (yellow card) 55'; Áfrico (yellow card) 64'; Seruca (yellow card) 90+2'	Stadium: Estádio Municipal de Arouca; Referee: Fábio Veríssimo

14 January 2025 Fifth round	Farense	v	Benfica	Almancil (Loulé)
20:15				Stadium: Estádio Algarve
