= 2023–24 S.C. Farense season =

S.C. Farense
2023–24 season
- Stadium: Estádio de São Luís
- Primeira Liga: 8th
- Taça de Portugal: Third round
- Taça da Liga: Third round

The 2023–24 season is S.C. Farense's 107th season in existence and first one back in the Primeira Liga. They are also competing in the Taça de Portugal and Taça da Liga.

== Players ==
=== First-team squad ===
As of 26 September 2023

Note: Flags indicate national team as defined under FIFA eligibility rules; some limited exceptions apply. Players may hold more than one non-FIFA nationality.

No.	Pos.	Nation	Player
1	GK	BRA	Luiz Felipe
2	DF	ESP	Fran Delgado
3	DF	BRA	Igor Rossi
4	DF	POR	Artur Jorge
5	MF	ARG	Facundo Cáseres
6	DF	MLT	Zach Muscat
7	FW	GBS	Elves Baldé
8	MF	POR	Rafael Barbosa
9	FW	BRA	Bruno Duarte
10	MF	COL	Jhon Velásquez
12	DF	BRA	Talys
14	MF	BRA	Fabrício Isidoro (captain)
19	FW	POR	Rui Costa
20	FW	POR	Cristian Ponde

No.	Pos.	Nation	Player
22	GK	POR	Miguel Carvalho
27	MF	BRA	Mattheus Oliveira
28	DF	BRA	Pastor (on loan from Ferroviária)
29	MF	BRA	Claudio Falcão
31	DF	POR	Talocha
33	GK	POR	Ricardo Velho
37	DF	POR	Gonçalo Silva
47	GK	BRA	Kauan
50	MF	POR	André Seruca
62	FW	ALG	Mohamed Belloumi
77	FW	POR	Marco Matias
80	MF	POR	Vítor Gonçalves
91	FW	CPV	Zé Luís

=== Other players under contract ===
Note: Flags indicate national team as defined under FIFA eligibility rules; some limited exceptions apply. Players may hold more than one non-FIFA nationality.

No.	Pos.	Nation	Player
—	FW	NGR	Adewale Sapara (on loan from Portimonense)

=== Out on loan ===
Note: Flags indicate national team as defined under FIFA eligibility rules; some limited exceptions apply. Players may hold more than one non-FIFA nationality.

No.	Pos.	Nation	Player
90	FW	BRA	Maxwel Cássio (at Belenenses until 30 June 2024)

== Transfers ==
=== In ===
Pos.	Player	Transferred from	Fee	Date	Source
FW	(Brazil) Bruno Duarte	(Saudi Arabia) Damac	Free	20 July 2023	

=== Out ===
Pos.	Player	Transferred to	Fee	Date	Source
DF	(Brazil) Abner	(Belgium) RWDM	Free	1 July 2023	

== Pre-season and friendlies ==
Win Draw Loss Fixtures

== Competitions ==
=== Overall record ===
Competition	First match	Last match	Starting round	Final position	Record							
Competition	First match	Last match	Starting round	Final position	Pld	W	D	L	GF	GA	GD	Win %
Primeira Liga	16 August 2023	19 May 2024	Matchday 1		13	5	2	6	22	18	+4	38.46
Taça de Portugal	22 October 2023		Third round	Third round	1	0	0	1	2	3	−1	0.00
Taça da Liga	23 July 2023		First round		4	2	1	1	7	7	+0	50.00
Total					18	7	3	8	31	28	+3	38.89

Last updated: 2 December 2023
Source: Soccerway

=== Primeira Liga ===
==== League table ====
Pos	Team	Pld	W	D	L	GF	GA	GD	Pts
8	Famalicão	34	10	12	12	37	41	−4	42
9	Casa Pia	34	10	8	16	38	50	−12	38
10	Farense	34	10	7	17	46	51	−5	37 (Note: Head-to-head points: Farense 4, Rio Ave 1.)
11	Rio Ave	34	6	19	9	38	43	−5	37
12	Gil Vicente	34	9	9	16	42	52	−10	36

Source: Liga Portugal
Rules for classification: 1) Points; 2) Head-to-head points; 3) Head-to-head goal difference; 4) Head-to-head away goals scored; 5) Goal difference; 6) Matches won; 7) Goals scored; 8) Play-off.

==== Results summary ====
Overall								Home						Away					
Pld	W	D	L	GF	GA	GD	Pts	W	D	L	GF	GA	GD	W	D	L	GF	GA	GD
34	10	7	17	46	51	−5	37	6	4	7	24	23	+1	4	3	10	22	28	−6

Last updated: 18 May 2024.
Source: Superliga

==== Results by round ====
Round	1	2	3	4	5	6	7	8	9	10	11	12	13	14	15	16	17	18	19	20	21	22	23	24	25	26	27	28	29	30	31	32	33	34
Ground	H	A	H	A	H	A	H	H	A	H	A	H	A	H	A	H	A	A	H	A	H	A	H	A	A	H	A	H	A	H	A	H	A	H
Result	L	L	W	L	W	L	L	D	W	W	W	L	D	D	L	W	L	W	L	D	D	L	L	L	L	D	L	W	D	L	W	W	L	L
Position	17	17	11	15	10	11	12	13	12	9	7	7	7	7	7	7	8	7	7	8	8	8	8	11	12	11	13	10	10	10	10	10	10	10

Updated to match(es) played on 18 May 2024. Source: Superliga
A = Away; H = Home; W = Win; D = Draw; L = Loss

==== Matches ====
The league fixtures were unveiled on 5 July 2023.

12 August 2023 1	Farense	0–3	Casa Pia	Faro
18:00 WET (UTC±0)	Belloumi (yellow card) 65'; Rafael Barbosa (yellow card) 90+2'	Report	Clayton 15'; Ângelo Neto (yellow card) 45+3'; Ricardo Batista (yellow card) 49'; Pablo Roberto 64'; Beni (yellow card) 74'; Zolotić (yellow card) 86'; Godwin 90' (pen.)	Stadium: Estádio de São Luís; Attendance: 3,953; Referee: (Portugal) Bruno Vieira

20 August 2023 2	Porto	2–1	Farense	Porto
18:00 WET (UTC±0)	Toni Martínez 13'; Pepê (yellow card) 45+5'; Iván Marcano (yellow card) 90+2' (goal) 90+10'	Report	Rui Costa 45+1'; Claudio Falcão (yellow card) 61'; Pastor (yellow card) 74'; Marco Matias (yellow card) 78'	Stadium: Estádio do Dragão; Attendance: 48,129; Referee: (Portugal) Claúdio Pereira

26 August 2023 3	Farense	5–0	Chaves	Faro
18:00 WET (UTC±0)	Muscat 10'; Claudio Falcão 17'; Belloumi 20'; Fabrício Isidoro 22'; Mattheus Oliveira 49'; Rui Costa (yellow card) 69'; Talocha (yellow card) 75'	Report	Paulo Victor (yellow card) 59'	Stadium: Estádio de São Luís; Attendance: 3,858; Referee: (Portugal) Luís Godinho

2 September 2023 4	Famalicão	1–0	Farense	Vila Nova de Famalicão
18:00 WET (UTC±0)	Óscar Aranda (yellow card) 20'; Cádiz 79'	Report	Mattheus Oliveira (yellow card) 24'; Claudio Falcão (yellow card) 37'; Marco Matias (yellow card) 54'; Muscat (red card) 64'	Stadium: Estádio Municipal 22 de Junho; Attendance: 4,171; Referee: (Portugal) Iancu Vasilica

16 September 2023 5	Farense	3–1	Braga	Faro
18:00 WET (UTC±0)	Bruno Duarte 31'; Gonçalo Silva (yellow card) 37'; Rui Costa 44' (yellow card) 71'; Belloumi 58'; Talocha (yellow card) 62'; Artur Jorge (yellow card) 90'	Report	João Moutinho (yellow card) 37'; Abel Ruiz (yellow card) 50'; Banza 56'; Paulo Oliveira (yellow card) 83'; Zalazar (yellow card) 86'; Al-Musrati (yellow card) 90+4'	Stadium: Estádio de São Luís; Attendance: 5,006; Referee: (Portugal) António Nobre

23 September 2023 6	Moreirense	1–0	Farense	Moreira de Cónegos
15:30 WET (UTC±0)	Alan 17'; Carlos Ponck (yellow card) 51'	Report	Pastor (yellow card) 22'; Mattheus Oliveira (yellow card) 86'	Stadium: Parque de Jogos Comendador Joaquim de Almeida Freitas; Attendance: 1,695; Referee: (Portugal) João Gonçalves

30 September 2023 7	Farense	2–3	Sporting CP	Faro
20:30 WET (UTC±0)	Gonçalo Silva (red card) 18'; Mattheus Oliveira 37' 55' (yellow card) 63'; Belloumi (yellow card) 58'; Zé Luís (yellow card) 85'; Ricardo Velho (yellow card) 88'; Artur Jorge (yellow card) 90+3'	Report	Gyökeres 21' (pen.) 90' (pen.); Pote 35' (yellow card) 88'; Hjulmand (yellow card) 36'; Nuno Santos (yellow card) 53'; Daniel Bragança (yellow card) 84'; Gonçalo Inácio (yellow card) 85'; Morita (yellow card) 90+4'	Stadium: Estádio de São Luís; Attendance: 6,020; Referee: (Portugal) Luís Godinho

7 October 2023 8	Farense	0–0	Vizela	Faro
15:30 WET (UTC±0)	Igor Rossi (yellow card) 66'	Report	Alberto Soro (yellow card) 90+8'	Stadium: Estádio de São Luís; Attendance: 4,811; Referee: (Portugal) João Pinheiro

29 October 2023 9	Rio Ave	3–4	Farense	Vila do Conde
15:30 WET (UTC±0)	Miguel Nóbrega (yellow card) 31'; Artur Jorge 33' (o.g.); André Pereira 42' (yellow card) 47'; Costinha 62' (pen.); João Graça (yellow card) 90+5'	Report	Belloumi 4'; Marco Matias (yellow card) 44'; Bruno Duarte 45+2' (yellow card) 57'; Artur Jorge (yellow card) 81'; Claudio Falcão 89'; Rui Costa 90+3'	Stadium: Estádio dos Arcos; Attendance: 1,865; Referee: (Portugal) Tiago Martins

6 November 2023 10	Farense	2–0	Arouca	Faro
20:15 WET (UTC±0)	Claudio Falcão (yellow card) 25'; Mattheus Oliveira 31' (pen.); Bruno Duarte 38' (pen.)	Report	David Simão (yellow card) 71'	Stadium: Estádio de São Luís; Attendance: 4,237; Referee: (Portugal) Iancu Vasilica

12 November 2023 11	Boavista	1–3	Farense	Porto
15:30 WET (UTC±0)	Miguel Reisinho (yellow card) 50'; Awaziem (yellow card) 83'; Boženík 86'; Martim Tavares (yellow card) 90'	Report	Elves Baldé 29'; Fabrício Isidoro (yellow card) 80' (goal) 90+2'; Rafael Barbosa 90+6'	Stadium: Estádio da Luz; Attendance: 6,520; Referee: (Portugal) André Narciso

2 December 2023 12	Farense	1–2	Vitória Guimarães	Faro
15:30 WET (UTC±0)	Pastor (yellow card) 24'; Bruno Duarte 57' (pen.); Fabrício Isidoro (yellow card) 61' (yellow-red card) 63'	Report	Tomás Ribeiro 3' (yellow card) 22'; Miguel Maga (yellow card) 59'; Jorge Fernandes (yellow card) 75'; Jota Silva 87'	Stadium: Estádio de São Luís; Attendance: 4,955; Referee: (Portugal) Manuel Oliveira

8 December 2023 13	Benfica	1–1	Farense	Lisbon
18:00 WET (UTC±0)	Rafa Silva 71'; Otamendi (yellow card) 78'; João Mário (yellow card) 82'	Report	Muscat (yellow card) 36'; Claudio Falcão 51'; Pastor (yellow card) 90'; Cáseres (yellow card) 90'	Stadium: Estádio da Luz; Attendance: 56,766; Referee: (Portugal) Miguel Nogueira

15 December 2023 14	Farense	0–0	Estrela	Faro
20:15 WET (UTC±0)	Mattheus Oliveira (yellow card) 8'; Fabrício Isidoro (yellow card) 81'	Report	Léo Jabá (yellow card) 71'	Stadium: Estádio de São Luís; Attendance: 4,549; Referee: (Portugal) Claúdio Pereira

30 December 2023 15	Estoril	4–0	Farense	Estoril
15:30 WET (UTC±0)	João Marques 4' 47'; Marcelo Carné (yellow card) 22'; Holsgrove (yellow card) 30'; Tiago Araújo 45+5'; Raúl Parra 78'	Report	Claudio Falcão (yellow card) 24'; Pastor (yellow card) 54'	Stadium: Estádio António Coimbra da Mota; Attendance: 2,562; Referee: (Portugal) Ricardo Baixinho

6 January 2024 16	Farense	1–0	Gil Vicente	Faro
15:30 WET (UTC±0)	Claudio Falcão (yellow card) 83'; Talocha (yellow card) 85'; Vítor Gonçalves 90+1'	Report	Zé Carlos (yellow card) 44'; Dominguez (yellow card) 50'	Stadium: Estádio de São Luís; Attendance: 4,437; Referee: (Portugal) José Bessa

12 January 2024 17	Portimonense	1–0	Farense	Portimão
20:15 WET (UTC±0)	Pedrão (yellow card) 18'; Carlinhos 58' (pen.) (yellow card) 69'	Report	Cáseres (yellow card) 39'; Fran Delgado (yellow card) 73'; Muscat (yellow card) 90+5'	Stadium: Estádio Municipal de Portimão; Attendance: 3,611; Referee: (Portugal) Fábio Veríssimo

20 January 2024 18	Casa Pia	1–3	Farense	Lisbon
18:00 WET (UTC±0)	Fernando Andrade 87'	Report	Marco Matias 24'; Muscat 40' (yellow card) 90+5'; Bruno Duarte 75'	Stadium: Estádio Pina Manique; Attendance: 1,726; Referee: (Portugal) Carlos Macedo

28 January 2024 19	Farense	1–3	Farense	Faro
18:00 WET (UTC±0)	Gonçalo Silva (yellow card) 25'; Bruno Duarte 59' (pen.)	Report	Evanilson 35' 76'; Varela 41'	Stadium: Estádio de São Luís; Attendance: 6,356; Referee: (Portugal) João Pinheiro

4 February 2024 20	Chaves	1–1	Farense	Chaves
15:30 WET (UTC±0)	Ygor Nogueira (red card) 16'; Nwakali (yellow card) 24'; Héctor Hernández 53' (pen.); Paulo Victor (yellow card) 84'	Report	Bruno Duarte 35'; Ricardo Velho (yellow card) 51'; Muscat (yellow card) 60'; Claudio Falcão (yellow card) 65'; Fabrício Isidoro (yellow card) 74'	Stadium: Estádio Municipal Eng. Manuel Branco Teixeira; Attendance: 2,308; Referee: (Portugal) Ricardo Baixinho

10 February 2024 21	Farense	1–1	Famalicão	Faro
15:30 WET (UTC±0)	Bruno Duarte 90+2'	Report	Sorriso 19'; Nathan (yellow card) 24'; Gustavo Sá (yellow card) 50'; Mihaj (yellow card) 70'; Chiquinho (yellow card) 75'; Luiz Júnior (yellow card) 78'; de Haas (yellow card) 79'	Stadium: Estádio de São Luís; Attendance: 4,815; Referee: (Portugal) Hélder Malheiro

18 February 2024 22	Braga	2–1	Farense	Braga
20:30 WET (UTC±0)	Zalazar (yellow card) 45'; Banza 62'; José Fonte (yellow card) 63'; Álvaro Djaló (yellow card) 73'; Ndour 85'; Matheus (yellow card) 89'; Niakaté (yellow card) 90+6'	Report	Claudio Falcão (yellow card) 36'; Bruno Duarte (yellow card) 39'; Pastor (yellow card) 40'; Belloumi 74'	Stadium: Estádio Municipal de Braga; Attendance: 11,270; Referee: (Portugal) André Narciso

24 February 2024 23	Farense	0–1	Moreirense	Faro
15:30 WET (UTC±0)	Cáseres (yellow card) 27'; Mattheus Oliveira (red card) 36'	Report	Madson 28'	Stadium: Estádio de São Luís; Attendance: 4,646; Referee: (Portugal) Nuno Almeida

3 March 2024 24	Sporting CP	3–2	Farense	Lisbon
18:00 WET (UTC±0)	Daniel Bragança 11'; Gyökeres 29'; St. Juste (yellow card) 48'; Pote 53'	Report	Fabrício Isidoro (yellow card) 22'; Belloumi 32'; Muscat (yellow card) 40'; Zé Luís (yellow card) 45+1' (goal) 50'	Stadium: Estádio José Alvalade; Attendance: 39,063; Referee: (Portugal) Claúdio Pereira

9 March 2024 25	Vizela	2–1	Farense	Vizela
15:30 WET (UTC±0)	Pedro Ortiz (yellow card) 47'; Petrov 71'; Alberto Soro 85'	Report	Zé Luís 17'; Belloumi (yellow card) 28'; Claudio Falcão (yellow card) 45+2'; Igor Rossi (yellow card) 74'	Stadium: Estádio do Futebol Clube de Vizela; Attendance: 2,006; Referee: (Portugal) Bruno Pires Costa

16 March 2024 26	Farense	1–1	Rio Ave	Faro
18:00 WET (UTC±0)	Marco Matias (yellow card) 22'; Fabrício Isidoro 31'; Claudio Falcão (yellow card) 89'	Report	Boateng 50'; Patrick William (yellow card) 60'	Stadium: Estádio de São Luís; Attendance: 4,713; Referee: (Portugal) Miguel Nogueira

30 March 2024 27	Arouca	2–1	Farense	Arouca
15:30 WET (UTC±0)	Tiago Esgaio 45+1'; de Arruabarrena (yellow card) 55'; Cristo González 68'; Trezza (yellow card) 78'; Pedro Moreira (yellow card) 90+1'	Report	Cáseres (yellow card) 49' (yellow-red card) 90+5'; Bruno Duarte (yellow card) 82' (goal) 88'	Stadium: Estádio Municipal de Arouca; Attendance: 1,127; Referee: (Portugal) Luís Godinho

5 April 2024 28	Farense	2–0	Boavista	Faro
20:15 WET (UTC±0)	Claudio Falcão 28'; Bruno Duarte 39' (yellow card) 79'; Fabrício Isidoro (yellow card) 62'; Igor Rossi (yellow card) 78'	Report	Sasso (yellow card) 53'; Luís Santos (yellow card) 78'; Makouta (yellow card) 90+4'	Stadium: Estádio de São Luís; Attendance: 4,928; Referee: (Portugal) Iancu Vasilica

13 April 2024 29	Vitória de Guimarães	1–1	Farense	Guimarães
15:30 WET (UTC±0)	Jorge Fernandes (yellow card) 17' (goal) 90+6'; Bruno Gaspar (yellow card) 90+8'	Report	Bruno Duarte 9' (yellow card) 65'; Claudio Falcão (yellow card) 40'; Pastor (yellow card) 88'; Mattheus Oliveira (yellow card) 90+4'	Stadium: Estádio D. Afonso Henriques; Attendance: 19,982; Referee: (Portugal) David Silva

22 April 2024 30	Farense	1–3	Benfica	Faro
20:15 WET (UTC±0)	Belloumi 23'; Claudio Falcão (yellow card) 53'	Report	Kökçü 16'; Florentino Luís (yellow card) 26'; Arthur Cabral 34'; João Mário (yellow card) 44'; Álvaro Carreras 67'	Stadium: Estádio de São Luís; Attendance: 6,309; Referee: (Portugal) Gustavo Correia

29 April 2024 31	Estrela	0–3	Farense	Amadora
20:15 WET (UTC±0)	Kialonda Gaspar (yellow card) 45+1'; Hevertton Santos (yellow card) 52'	Report	Bruno Duarte (yellow card) 34' (goal) 44' (pen.); Belloumi 47'; Cáseres (yellow card) 65'; Marco Matias 79'	Stadium: Estádio José Gomes; Attendance: 5,384; Referee: (Portugal) Fábio Veríssimo

5 May 2024 32	Farense	3–2	Estoril	Faro
15:30 WET (UTC±0)	Gonçalo Silva 36'; Claudio Falcão (yellow card) 43'; Mattheus Oliveira 45'; Bruno Duarte 65'; Fabrício Isidoro (yellow card) 82'; Igor Rossi (yellow card) 88'	Report	Fabrício Garcia 45+2'; Rodrigo Gomes 52'	Stadium: Estádio de São Luís; Attendance: 5,508; Referee: (Portugal) Luís Godinho

12 May 2024 33	Gil Vicente	2–0	Farense	Barcelos
15:30 WET (UTC±0)	Fujimoto 17'; Félix Correia 19'; Dominguez (yellow card) 21'; Zé Carlos (yellow card) 22'; Murilo Costa (yellow card) 23'; Touré (yellow card) 88'	Report		Stadium: Estádio Cidade de Barcelos; Attendance: 5,831; Referee: (Portugal) Iancu Vasilica

18 May 2024 34	Farense	1–3	Portimonense	Faro
15:30 WET (UTC±0)	Pastor (yellow card) 49' (yellow-red card) 90+9'; Cristian Ponde 55'; Gonçalo Silva (yellow card) 58'	Report	Hildeberto Pereira 11'; Carlinhos 32'; Guga (yellow card) 83'; Filipe Relvas (red card) 88'; Lucas Ventura 90+7'	Stadium: Estádio de São Luís; Attendance: 5,888; Referee: (Portugal) Artur Soares Dias

=== Taça de Portugal ===
22 October 2023 Third Round	Vilaverdense	3 - 2	Farense	Vila Verde
15:00	João Batista (yellow card) 30'; Lénio Neves 54'; Momo Sacko (yellow card) 73'; André Soares (yellow card) 74'; João Caiado 87'; Bruno Silva 90+1'	Report	Zé Luís (yellow card) 31'; Talocha 90+3'; Bruno Duarte 90+8' (pen.)	Stadium: Campo Cruz do Reguengo; Attendance: 1,500; Referee: (Portugal) José Bessa

=== Taça da Liga ===
23 July 2023 Round 1	Moreirense	1 - 1 (3 – 4 p)	Farense	Moreira de Cónegos
15:30	Dinis Pinto (yellow card) 15'; João Camacho (yellow card) 45'; Kodisang (yellow card) 62'; André Luis 89'	Report	Rui Costa 21'; Mattheus Oliveira (yellow card) 56'; Muscat (yellow card) 63'; Talys (yellow card) 66'; Ricardo Velho (yellow card) 75'; Maxwel Cássio (yellow card) 79'	Stadium: Parque de Jogos Comendador Joaquim de Almeida Freitas; Attendance: 1,208; Referee: (Portugal) Claúdio Pereira

29 July 2023 Round 2	Farense	3 - 2	Oliveirense	Faro
18:00	Marco Matias 16'; Rui Costa 30'; Mattheus Oliveira 35'; Cristian Ponde (yellow card) 86'	Report	Ricardo Schutte 55'; Zé Pedro 60'	Stadium: Estádio de São Luís; Attendance: 1,708; Referee: (Portugal) Pedro Ramalho

27 September 2023 Round 3 Match 1	Farense	1 - 0	Tondela	Faro
19:00	Zé Luís 14'; Vítor Gonçalves (yellow card) 20' (yellow-red card) 47'; Luiz Felipe (yellow card) 24'	Report	Jota Gonçalves (yellow card) 77'	Stadium: Estádio de São Luís; Attendance: 1,545; Referee: (Portugal) André Narciso

2 November 2023 Round 3 Match 2	Sporting CP	4 - 2	Farense	Lisbon
20:15	Matheus Reis (yellow card) 14'; Gyökeres 24' 28' (pen.) 63'; Nuno Santos 56'	Report	Mattheus Oliveira 49'; Vítor Gonçalves 79'	Stadium: Estádio José Alvalade; Attendance: Gustavo Correia; Referee: (Portugal) 22,801
