= 2022–23 S.C. Farense season =

S.C. Farense
2022–23 season
- Chairman: João Rodrigues
- Manager: Vasco Faísca
- Stadium: Estádio de São Luís
- Liga Portugal 2: 2nd
- Taça de Portugal: Fourth round
- Taça da Liga: Group stage
- All statistics correct as of 16 November 2022.

The 2022–23 season is the 113th season in the history of S.C. Farense and their second consecutive season in the second division of Portuguese football. The club are participating in the Liga Portugal 2, the Taça de Portugal, and the Taça da Liga. The season covers the period from 1 July 2022 to 30 June 2023.

== Players ==
As of 23 July 2022

Note: Flags indicate national team as defined under FIFA eligibility rules; some limited exceptions apply. Players may hold more than one non-FIFA nationality.

No.	Pos.	Nation	Player
1	GK	BRA	Rafael Defendi
2	DF	BRA	Róbson
7	FW	CPV	Vasco Lopes
8	MF	BRA	Marcos Paulo
9	FW	BRA	Lucão
10	MF	COL	Jhon Velásquez
11	FW	POR	Elves Baldé
14	MF	BRA	Fabrício Isidoro
17	DF	POR	Miguel Bandarra
20	FW	POR	Cristian Ponde
22	GK	POR	Miguel Carvalho
25	MF	POR	Rafinha

No.	Pos.	Nation	Player
29	MF	BRA	Claudio Falcão
30	DF	BRA	Abner
31	DF	POR	Talocha
33	GK	POR	Ricardo Velho
35	FW	STP	Harramiz
37	DF	POR	Gonçalo Silva
50	MF	POR	André Seruca
72	DF	POR	Vasco Oliveira
77	FW	POR	Marco Matias
80	MF	POR	Vítor Gonçalves
96	FW	BRA	Pedro Henrique

== Pre-season and friendlies ==
Win Draw Loss Fixtures

16 July 2022 Friendly	Farense (Portugal)	2–1	(Portugal) Académica	Luso
10:00 WEST (UTC+1)				Stadium: Centro de Estágios de Luso

16 July 2022 Friendly	Farense (Portugal)	3–2	(Portugal) Anadia	Luso
17:00 WEST (UTC+1)				Stadium: Centro de Estágios de Luso

23 July 2022 Friendly	Mafra (Portugal)	2–3	(Portugal) Farense	Mafra
17:00 WEST (UTC+1)				Stadium: Estádio Municipal de Mafra

31 July 2022 Friendly	Farense (Portugal)	1–1	(England) Wolverhampton Wanderers	Faro
18:45 WEST (UTC+1)	Ponde 5'		Coady (yellow card) 3'; Hwang Hee-chan 56' (pen.)	Stadium: Estádio de São Luís

== Competitions ==
=== Overall record ===
Competition	First match	Last match	Starting round	Final position	Record							
Competition	First match	Last match	Starting round	Final position	Pld	W	D	L	GF	GA	GD	Win %
Liga Portugal 2	6 August 2022	May 2023	Matchday 1	2°	33	20	6	7	54	33	+21	60.61
Taça de Portugal	1 October 2022	9 November 2022	Second round	Fourth round	3	2	0	1	5	3	+2	66.67
Taça da Liga	30 November 2022	13 December 2022	Group stage	3°	3	1	0	2	3	8	−5	33.33
Total					39	23	6	10	62	44	+18	58.97

Last updated: 21 May 2023
Source: Soccerway

=== Liga Portugal 2 ===
==== League table ====
Pos	Team	Pld	W	D	L	GF	GA	GD	Pts	Promotion or relegation
1	Moreirense (C, P)	34	24	7	3	77	38	+39	79	Promotion to Primeira Liga
2	Farense (P)	34	21	6	7	57	34	+23	69	Promotion to Primeira Liga
3	Estrela da Amadora (O, P)	34	16	15	3	55	35	+20	63	Qualification to Promotion play-offs
4	Académico de Viseu	34	14	11	9	51	45	+6	53	
5	Porto B (I)	34	14	9	11	48	40	+8	51	

Updated to match(es) played on 28 May 2023. Source: Liga Portugal 2
Rules for classification: 1) Points; 2) Head-to-head points; 3) Head-to-head goal difference; 4) Head-to-head away goals scored; 5) Goal difference; 6) Matches won; 7) Goals scored; 8) Play-off.
(C) Champions; (I) Ineligible for promotion; (O) Play-off winners; (P) Promoted

==== Results summary ====
Overall								Home						Away					
Pld	W	D	L	GF	GA	GD	Pts	W	D	L	GF	GA	GD	W	D	L	GF	GA	GD
0	0	0	0	0	0	0	0	0	0	0	0	0	0	0	0	0	0	0	0

Last updated: August 2022.
Source: Liga Portugal

==== Results by round ====
Round	1
Ground	
Result	
Position	

Updated to match(es) played on August 2022. Source: Liga Portugal
A = Away; H = Home; W = Win; D = Draw; L = Loss

==== Matches ====
The league fixtures were announced on 5 July 2022.

6 August 2022 1	Farense	2–1	Torreense	Faro

13 August 2022 2	Estrela da Amadora	1–1	Farense	Amadora

20 August 2022 3	Farense	2–2	Académico de Viseu	Faro

29 August 2022 4	Mafra	0–3	Farense	Mafra

4 September 2022 5	Farense	2–2	Sporting Covilhã	Faro

11 September 2022 6	Leixões	0–1	Farense	Matosinhos

18 September 2022 7	Farense	2–1	Vilafranquense	Faro

7 October 2022 8	B-SAD	2–3	Farense	Oeiras
				Stadium: Estádio Nacional

16 November 2022 9	Farense	3–1	Trofense	Faro

23 October 2022 10	Moreirense	3–2	Farense	Moreirense

26 February 2023 22	Sporting Covilhã	1–0	Farense	Covilhã

5 March 2023 23	Farense	1–0	Leixões	Faro

11 March 2023 24	Vilafranquense	1–1	Farense	Vila Franca de Xira

19 March 2023 25	Farense	4–0	B-SAD	Faro

1 April 2023 26	Trofense	2–1	Farense	Trofa

7 April 2023 27	Farense	3–1	Moreirense	Faro

14 April 2023 28	Oliveirense	1–2	Farense	Oliveira de Azeméis

22 April 2023 29	Farense	2–1	Penafiel	Faro

29 April 2023 30	Feirense	1–2	Farense	Santa Maria da Feira

7 May 2023 31	Farense	2–0	Porto B	Faro

14 May 2023 32	Nacional	0–1	Tondela	Funchal

19 May 2023 33	Benfica B	0–1	Tondela	Lisbon

28 May 2023 34	Farense	3–1	Tondela	Faro
