= Mohamed Belloumi =

Algerian footballer (born 2002)

Bachir Belloumi
- Belloumi in 2026

Personal information
- Full name: Mohamed El Bachir Belloumi
- Date of birth: 1 June 2002 (age 24)
- Place of birth: Mascara, Algeria
- Position: Winger

Team information
- Current team: Hull City
- Number: 10

Youth career
- 2012–2020: GC Mascara
- 2020: MC Oran
- 2022: Farense

Senior career*
Years	Team	Apps	(Gls)
2020–2021	MC Oran	28	(3)
2022–2024	Farense	37	(7)
2024–	Hull City	38	(7)

International career^{‡}
2020	Algeria U20	4	(1)
2021	Algeria A'	1	(0)
2026–	Algeria	3	(2)
- * Club domestic league appearances and goals as of 11 October 2026 (UTC) ‡ National team caps and goals as of 6 October 2026 (UTC)

Mohamed El Bachir Belloumi (Arabic: محمد البشير بلومي; born 1 June 2002), also known as Bachir Belloumi, is an Algerian professional footballer who plays as a winger for Premier League club Hull City and the Algeria national team. He is the son of Algerian former footballer Lakhdar Belloumi.

== Club career ==
=== MC Oran ===
Belloumi started his career young with GC Mascara. On 25 August 2020, he was transferred in MC Oran. On 16 January 2021, Belloumi was promoted to MC Oran's first team, and played the first match against CR Belouizdad as a substitute. The first goal in his football career was in a 6–0 victory against US Biskra. He left the club for Europe in September 2021.

=== Farense ===
On 27 February 2022, Belloumi moved to Portugal, joining Liga Portugal 2 club Farense. On 31 July 2023, following promotion to the Primeira Liga, he extended his contract with the Faro-based club until 2026, with his release clause being set at €5 million.

After impressing during the first half of the 2023–24 season, in January 2024 Belloumi extended his contract with Farense until 2027, which saw his release clause rise to €15 million.

=== Hull City ===
==== 2024–25 season ====
On 30 August 2024, Belloumi moved to EFL Championship club Hull City for an undisclosed fee. He signed a four-year deal with the Tigers that would keep him at the club until the summer of 2028. On 13 September, he made his debut in the 0–2 loss at home to Sheffield United. On 28 September, he scored two goals in the 4–1 home win against Cardiff City. However, just over a month later, on 8 November, Hull announced that Belloumi had suffered an ACL injury in the club's recent match against Oxford United, and would miss the remainder of the 2024–25 season.

==== 2025–26 season ====
He made his return on 23 August 2025, in a league match at home to Blackburn Rovers. During the game, Belloumi came off the bench to replace Regan Slater in the 85th minute, as Hull slumped to a 3–0 defeat. On 11 May 2026, Belloumi scored a goal and made an assist in the second leg of the 2026 EFL Championship play-off semi-final against Millwall, securing Hull City's place in the play-off final. Belloumi was a starter in the 2026 EFL Championship play-off final against Middlesbrough, which Hull won, securing promotion to the Premier League.

==== 2026-27 season ====
Following Hull's promotion, Belloumi scored 3 goals, assisting a further 2, in Hull's first 9 games back in the Premier League.

== International career ==
Belloumi was on the final list to participate in the 2020 UNAF U-20 Tournament qualifying for the 2021 Africa U-20 Cup of Nations and participated in all matches and scored one goal against Tunisia.

On 17 June 2021, Belloumi was called up for the first time to the Algeria A' national football team in the opening match of the new stadium in Oran against Liberia and participated as a substitute in a 5–1 win.

On 25 September 2026, Belloumi made his senior debut for the Algeria national football team in a 3–1 win over Zambia during 2027 Africa Cup of Nations qualification.

== Career statistics ==
=== Club ===
As of match played 11 October 2026

Appearances and goals by club, season and competition
Club	Season	League			National cup (Note: Includes Taça de Portugal)		League cup (Note: Includes Algerian League Cup, Taça da Liga, EFL Cup)		Other		Total	
Club	Season	Division	Apps	Goals	Apps	Goals	Apps	Goals	Apps	Goals	Apps	Goals
MC Oran	2020–21	Ligue 1 Pro.	28	3	—		3	0	—		31	3
Farense	2021–22	Liga Portugal 2	0	0	0	0	0	0	—		0	0
Farense	2022–23	Liga Portugal 2	1	0	1	0	1	0	—		3	0
Farense	2023–24	Primeira Liga	33	7	0	0	2	0	—		35	3
Farense	2024–25	Primeira Liga	3	0	—		—		—		3	0
Farense	Total		37	7	1	0	3	0	—		41	7
Hull City	2024–25	Championship	10	2	0	0	—		—		10	2
Hull City	2025–26	Championship	22	2	0	0	0	0	3 (Note: Appearances in EFL Championship play-offs)	1	25	3
Hull City	2026–27	Premier League	6	3	0	0	1	0	—		7	3
Hull City	Total		38	7	0	0	1	0	3	1	42	8
Career total			103	17	1	0	7	0	3	1	114	18

=== International ===
As of match played 6 October 2026

Appearances and goals by national team and year
National team	Year	Apps	Goals
Algeria	2026	3	2
Total		3	2

Scores and results list Algeria's goal tally first, score column indicates score after each Belloumi goal.

List of international goals scored by Mohamed Belloumi
No.	Date	Venue	Opponent	Score	Result	Competition
1	29 September 2026	Intwari Stadium, Bujumbura, Burundi	Burundi	1–2	2–2	2027 Africa Cup of Nations qualification
2	6 October 2026	Hocine Aït Ahmed Stadium, Tizi Ouzou, Algeria	Niger	1–1	2–1	Friendly

== Honours ==
Hull City

- EFL Championship play-offs: 2026

Individual

- Hull City Player of the Month: September 2024
- Hull City Goal of the Month: September 2024 (vs Cardiff City)
