= Miguel Carvalho =

Miguel Carvalho may refer to:

- Miguel Carvalho (race walker) (born 1994), Portuguese racewalker
- Miguel Carvalho (footballer, born 1996), Portuguese footballer who played as a goalkeeper
- Miguel Carvalho (footballer, born 2005), Spanish footballer
