= Rafael Barbosa (footballer, born 1996) =

Portuguese footballer

Personal information
- Full name: Rafael Avelino Pereira Pinto Barbosa
- Date of birth: 29 March 1996 (age 30)
- Place of birth: Amarante, Portugal
- Height: 1.70 m (5 ft 7 in)
- Position: Attacking midfielder

Team information
- Current team: Leixões
- Number: 27

Youth career
- 2004–2005: ACD Madalena
- 2005–2006: Académico Amarante
- 2006–2008: Boavista
- 2007–2008: → Pasteleira (loan)
- 2008–2015: Sporting CP

Senior career*
Years	Team	Apps	(Gls)
2015–2020	Sporting CP B	72	(12)
2016–2017	→ União Madeira (loan)	9	(0)
2018	→ Portimonense (loan)	4	(0)
2019	→ Paços Ferreira (loan)	16	(1)
2019–2020	→ Estoril (loan)	22	(4)
2020–2023	Tondela	92	(10)
2023–2025	Farense	34	(1)
2025	Radomiak Radom	9	(1)
2025–2026	AVS	13	(1)
2026–	Leixões	10	(0)

International career
2011	Portugal U15	2	(0)
2011–2012	Portugal U16	9	(0)
2012–2013	Portugal U17	5	(0)
2017	Portugal U21	1	(0)
- * Club domestic league appearances and goals as of 16:48, 14 June 2026 (UTC)

Rafael Avelino Pereira Pinto Barbosa (born 29 March 1996) is a Portuguese professional footballer who plays as an attacking midfielder for Liga Portugal 2 club Leixões.

== Club career ==
=== Sporting CP ===
Born in Amarante, Porto District, Barbosa joined Sporting CP's youth academy at the age of 12. On 12 September 2015, he made his professional debut with the reserve team, playing 50 minutes in a 4–0 away win against Clube Oriental de Lisboa in the Segunda Liga. He scored his first goal in the competition a month later, helping the visitors defeat C.D. Santa Clara 3–2.

After half a season on loan at fellow second-tier club C.F. União, Barbosa returned to Sporting B and netted eight times in 2017–18 from 34 appearances, in a final relegation to the third division. In the ensuing summer, he was loaned to Portimonense S.C. of the Primeira Liga.

Barbosa played his first match in the Portuguese top flight on 13 August 2018, coming on as a 73rd-minute substitute for Felipe Macedo in a 0–2 home loss to Boavista FC. On 30 September, during a game in the newly created under-23 league against S.L. Benfica, he was assaulted by the chairman of Portimonense's PLSC Rodiney Sampaio, initially pressing charges for the incident but sorting the situation out shortly after.

=== Tondela ===
On 18 August 2020, Barbosa signed a three-year contract with C.D. Tondela. On 23 October, he scored in a 1–0 home victory over Portimonense for his first goal in the top tier.

=== Farense ===
On 26 June 2023, the free agent Barbosa joined recently-promoted S.C. Farense on a two-year deal. He scored his first goal for them on 12 November, netting from outside the penalty area in a 3–1 league win at Boavista; the strike was later considered the Primeira Liga Goal of the Month for October/November.

=== Radomiak Radom ===
On 15 January 2025, Barbosa moved abroad for the first time after agreeing to an eighteen-month contract with Polish Ekstraklasa side Radomiak Radom. He scored once and provided one assist during his tenure, leaving by mutual consent on 18 June.

=== AVS ===
On 4 July 2025, Barbosa returned to Portugal on a two-year deal at top-division AVS Futebol SAD. During a brief spell, he totalled 16 appearances and two goals.

=== Later career ===
Barbosa transferred to second-division club Leixões S.C. on 3 February 2026, for free.

== International career ==
Barbosa won his only cap for the Portugal under-21 team on 5 September 2017, replacing Benfica's João Carvalho early into the second half of a 2–0 home defeat of Wales in the 2019 UEFA European Championship qualifiers.

== Career statistics ==
As of match played 24 May 2025

Appearances and goals by club, season and competition
Club	Season	League			National cup (Note: Includes Taça de Portugal)		League cup (Note: Includes Taça da Liga)		Other		Total	
Club	Season	Division	Apps	Goals	Apps	Goals	Apps	Goals	Apps	Goals	Apps	Goals
Sporting CP B	2015–16	LigaPro	23	1	—		—		—		23	1
Sporting CP B	2016–17	LigaPro	15	3	—		—		—		15	3
Sporting CP B	2017–18	LigaPro	34	8	—		—		—		34	8
Sporting CP B	Total		72	12	—		—		—		72	12
União Madeira (loan)	2016–17	LigaPro	9	0	2	0	2	0	—		13	0
Portimonense (loan)	2018–19	Primeira Liga	4	0	0	0	0	0	—		4	0
Paços Ferreira (loan)	2018–19	LigaPro	16	1	0	0	0	0	—		16	1
Estoril (loan)	2019–20	LigaPro	22	4	1	0	1	0	—		24	4
Tondela	2020–21	Primeira Liga	30	3	2	0	—		—		32	3
Tondela	2021–22	Primeira Liga	29	2	6	0	1	0	—		36	2
Tondela	2022–23	Liga Portugal 2	33	5	2	1	0	0	1 (Note: Appearance in Supertaça Cândido de Oliveira)	0	36	6
Tondela	Total		92	10	10	1	1	0	1	0	104	11
Farense	2023–24	Primeira Liga	27	1	0	0	4	0	—		31	1
Farense	2024–25	Primeira Liga	7	0	1	0	—		—		8	0
Farense	Total		34	1	1	0	4	0	—		39	1
Radomiak Radom	2024–25	Ekstraklasa	9	1	—		—		—		9	1
Career total			258	29	14	1	8	0	1	0	281	30

== Honours ==
Paços de Ferreira

- Segunda Liga: 2018–19

Individual

- Primeira Liga Goal of the Month: October/November 2023
