= 2020–21 MC Oran season =

MC Oran
2020–21 season
- President: Tayeb Mehiaoui (from 11 August 2020)
- Head coach: Bernard Casoni (from 31 August 2020) (until 12 January 2021); Kheïreddine Madoui (from 14 February 2021) (until 13 June 2021); Abdelatif Bouazza (from 13 June 2021)
- Stadium: Ahmed Zabana Stadium
- Ligue 1: Pre-season
- League Cup: Quarter-finals
- Highest home attendance: 0 (Note: no one can attend games due to the COVID-19 pandemic)
- Lowest home attendance: 0 (Note: no one can attend games due to the COVID-19 pandemic)
- Average home league attendance: 0 (Note: no one can attend games due to the COVID-19 pandemic)

In the 2020–21 season, MC Oran is competing in the Ligue 1 for the 55th season, as well as the Algerian Cup. It is their 12th consecutive season in the top flight of Algerian football.

== Squad list ==
Players and squad numbers last updated on 15 November 2020.
Note: Flags indicate national team as has been defined under FIFA eligibility rules. Players may hold more than one non-FIFA nationality.

No.	Name	Nat.	Pos.	Date of birth (age)	Signed from	Signed in
Goalkeepers
1	Houssam Limane	(Algeria)	GK	January 18, 1990 (aged 30)	(Algeria) CS Constantine	2020
16	Oussama Litim (captain)	(Algeria)	GK	June 3, 1990 (aged 30)	(Algeria) DRB Tadjenanet	2018
Defenders
2	Benali Benamar	(Algeria)	CB	January 12, 1995 (aged 25)	(Algeria) Olympique de Médéa	2020
3	Boualem Mesmoudi	(Algeria)	CB	April 15, 1994 (aged 26)	(Algeria) USM Bel Abbès	2019
4	Mohamed Naâmani	(Algeria)	CB	September 21, 1990 (aged 30)	(Saudi Arabia) Al Fateh	2020
13	Mohamed Amine Ezzemani	(Algeria)	LB	November 27, 1994 (aged 26)	(Algeria) USM El Harrach	2019
21	Zineddine Mekkaoui	(Algeria)	LB	January 10, 1987 (aged 33)	(Algeria) RC Relizane	2017
24	Senoussi Fourloul	(Algeria)	RB	March 15, 1991 (aged 29)	(Algeria) DRB Tadjenanet	2019
26	Hichem Belkaroui	(Algeria)	CB	August 24, 1990 (aged 30)	(Algeria) USM Alger	2020
27	Kamel Hamidi	(Algeria)	RB	May 1, 1996 (aged 24)	(Algeria) USM El Harrach	2019
Midfielders
5	Abdelkader Boutiche	(Algeria)	DM	October 26, 1996 (aged 24)	(Algeria) ASM Oran	2019
6	Mohamed Lagraâ	(Algeria)	DM	November 7, 1986 (aged 34)	(Algeria) USM Bel Abbès	2019
8	Bassem Chaouti	(Algeria)	AM	May 21, 1991 (aged 29)	(Algeria) CA Bordj Bou Arréridj	2019
17	Walid Derardja	(Algeria)	AM	September 18, 1990 (aged 30)	(Algeria) MC Alger	2020
18	Mohamed Bentiba	(Algeria)	MF	October 21, 1989 (aged 31)	(Algeria) MO Béjaïa	2020
20	Benamar Mellal	(Algeria)	RW	August 9, 1993 (aged 27)	(Algeria) CA Bordj Bou Arréridj	2019
22	Youcef Guertil	(Algeria)	RW	March 11, 1997 (aged 23)	(Algeria) MC Oran U19	2017
23	Abdelhafid Benamara	(Algeria)	DM	October 1, 1995 (aged 25)	(Algeria) USM El Harrach	2019
62	Bachir Belloumi	(Algeria)	MF	June 1, 2002 (aged 18)	(Algeria) GC Mascara U19	2020
Forwards
7	Zoubir Motrani (vice-captain)	(Algeria)	FW	July 24, 1995 (aged 25)	(Algeria) O Médéa	2019
9	Abdelhakim Berrezoug	(Algeria)	FW	May 14, 1998 (aged 22)	(Algeria) US Biskra	2020
10	Boumediene Freifer	(Algeria)	AM	November 15, 1998 (aged 22)	(Algeria) MC Oran U19	2017
11	Hichem Nekkache	(Algeria)	FW	March 7, 1991 (aged 29)	(Algeria) MC Alger	2020
12	Abdelkrim Benrabah	(Algeria)	FW	January 12, 1997 (aged 23)	(Algeria) IRB Sougueur	2020
14	Yacine Guenina	(Algeria)	FW	February 15, 1995 (aged 25)	(Algeria) MO Béjaïa	2020
15	Chérif Siam	(Algeria)	RW	May 1, 1995 (aged 25)	(Algeria) AS Aïn M'lila	2020
19	Mahi Benhamou	(Algeria)	LW	November 12, 1995 (aged 25)	(Algeria) SA Mohammadia	2019
25	Adel Khettab	(Algeria)	FW	February 18, 1993 (aged 27)	(Algeria) WA Boufarik	2020
38	Adel Ghrib	(Algeria)	FW	November 11, 2000 (aged 20)	(Algeria) MC Oran U19	2020

== Pre-season ==
23 October 2020 Friendly	MC Oran (Algeria)	2–0	(Algeria) AS Sûreté Nationale (Algiers)	Oran
9:00	Guenina; Freifer			Stadium: Ahmed Zabana Stadium; Attendance: 0 (close doors)

29 October 2020 Friendly	WA Tlemcen U21 (Algeria)	0–3	(Algeria) MC Oran	Tlemcen
19:00			Ezzemani; Khettab; Benhamou	Stadium: Stade Akid Lotfi; Attendance: 0 (close doors)

3 November 2020 Friendly	WA Tlemcen (Algeria)	1–1	(Algeria) MC Oran	Tlemcen
16:00	Asli		Mellal (pen.)	Stadium: Stade Akid Lotfi; Attendance: 0 (close doors)

11 November 2020 Friendly	MC Oran (Algeria)	6–0	(Algeria) 2nd Military Region (Oran)	Oran
16:00	Freifer; Khettab; Feghloul; Motrani			Stadium: Ahmed Zabana Stadium; Attendance: 0 (close doors)

14 November 2020 Friendly	MC Oran (Algeria)	1–0	(Algeria) JSM Skikda	Oran
16:00	Naâmani 30'			Stadium: Ahmed Zabana Stadium; Attendance: 0 (close doors)

21 November 2020 Friendly	MC Oran (Algeria)	4–0	(Algeria) MC Oran U21	Oran
15:00	Nekkache; Boutiche (pen.); Khettab			Stadium: Ahmed Zabana Stadium; Attendance: 0 (close doors)

== Competitions ==
=== Overview ===
Competition	Record								Started round	Final position / round	First match	Last match
Competition	G	W	D	L	GF	GA	GD	Win %	Started round	Final position / round	First match	Last match
Ligue 1	0	0	0	0	0	0	+0	—	—N/a	To be confirmed	27 November 2020	In Progress
League Cup	3	1	2	0	1	0	+1	33.33	Preliminary round	Quarter-finals	16 April 2021	5 June 2021
Total	0	0	0	0	0	0	+0	—				

Updated to match played 7 March 2020
Source: Competitions

== Ligue 1 ==
=== League table ===
Pos	Team	Pld	W	D	L	GF	GA	GD	Pts	Qualification or relegation
4	USM Alger	38	19	8	11	62	39	+23	65	
5	JS Kabylie	38	17	10	11	44	33	+11	61	Qualification for Confederation Cup
6	MC Oran	38	15	15	8	51	37	+14	60	
7	MC Alger	38	15	12	11	59	43	+16	57	
8	CS Constantine	38	15	12	11	43	31	+12	57	

Updated to match(es) played on 28 August 2021. Source: dzfoot.com
Rules for classification: 1) points; 2) head-to-head points; 3) head-to-head goal difference; 4) goal difference; 5) total goals; 6) fairplay ranking; 7) playoff.

=== Results summary ===
Overall								Home						Away					
Pld	W	D	L	GF	GA	GD	Pts	W	D	L	GF	GA	GD	W	D	L	GF	GA	GD
0	0	0	0	0	0	0	0	0	0	0	0	0	0	0	0	0	0	0	0

Last updated: 7 March 2020.
Source: Competitive matches

=== Results by round ===
Round	1	2	3	4	5	6	7	8	9	10	11	12	13	14	15	16	17	18	19	20	21	22	23	24	25	26	27	28	29	30	31	32	33	34	35	36	37	38
Ground																																						
Result	D	D	D	W	D	W	D	D	W	L	W	L	W	W	W	W	D	D	D	W	W	D	W	D	L	W	L	D	D	D	W	L	D	L	W	W	L	L
Position	6	12	12	6	9	7	6	8	7	9	7	9	7	5	5	4	4	5	5	4	4	4	4	4	4	4	4	5	5	5	5	5	5	6	5	5	5	6

Updated to match(es) played on 24 August 2021. Source: Competitive matches
A = Away; H = Home; W = Win; D = Draw; L = Loss

=== Matches ===
On 22 October 2020, the Algerian Ligue Professionnelle 1 fixtures were announced.

27 November 2020 Round 1	NA Hussein Dey	1–1	MC Oran	Belouizdad
14:30	Si Ammar 46'	Soccerway report	Boutiche 44' (pen.)	Stadium: Stade 20 Août 1955; Attendance: 0 (close doors); Referee: Abdelali Ibrir

4 December 2020 Round 2	MC Oran	0–0	JS Kabylie	Oran
16:00		Soccerway report		Stadium: Ahmed Zabana Stadium; Attendance: 0 (close doors); Referee: Abderrezzak Arab

11 December 2020 Round 3	Olympique de Médéa	1–1	MC Oran	Médéa
14:00	Khalfallah 40'	Soccerway report	Motrani 65'	Stadium: Stade Imam Lyes; Attendance: 0 (close doors); Referee: Youcef Gamouh

18 December 2020 Round 4	MC Oran	2–1	WA Tlemcen	Oran
15:00	Ezzemani 16'; Hamidi 84'	Soccerway report	Amiri 4'	Stadium: Ahmed Zabana Stadium; Attendance: 0 (close doors); Referee: Lahlou Benbraham

23 December 2020 Round 5	USM Bel Abbès	1–1	MC Oran	Sidi Bel Abbès
15:00	Litt 30'	Soccerway report	Hamidi 67'	Stadium: Stade 24 Fevrier 1956; Attendance: 0 (close doors); Referee: Mehdi Abid Charef

27 December 2020 Round 6	MC Oran	1–0	RC Relizane	Oran
15:00	Boutiche 27' (pen.)	Soccerway report		Stadium: Ahmed Zabana Stadium; Attendance: 0 (close doors); Referee: Said Aouina

11 January 2021 Round 7	MC Alger	1–1	MC Oran	Algiers
15:00	Lamara 27' (pen.)	Soccerway report	Mesmoudi 69'	Stadium: Stade du 5 Juillet; Attendance: 0 (close doors); Referee: Houssam Benyahia

16 January 2021 Round 8	CR Belouizdad	1–1	MC Oran	Belouizdad
14:30	Belahouel 22'	Soccerway report	Nekkache 26'	Stadium: Stade 20 Août 1955; Attendance: 0 (close doors); Referee: Ahmed Bouzrar

22 January 2021 Round 9	MC Oran	1–0	ASO Chlef	Oran
15:00	Mellel 90+2' (pen.)	Soccerway report		Stadium: Ahmed Zabana Stadium; Attendance: 0 (close doors); Referee: Lotfi Bekouassa

26 January 2021 Round 10	USM Alger	2–0	MC Oran	Bologhine
15:00	Benhammouda 51'; Soula 66'	Soccerway report		Stadium: Omar Hamadi Stadium; Attendance: 0 (close doors); Referee: Abderrezzak Arab

30 January 2021 Round 11	MC Oran	2–1	JS Saoura	Oran
15:00	Hamidi 31'; Mellel 64'	Soccerway report	Meddahi 71'	Stadium: Ahmed Zabana Stadium; Attendance: 0 (close doors); Referee: Yazid Ibrir

6 February 2021 Round 12	ES Sétif	4–1	MC Oran	Sétif
14:30	Touré 27'; Ferhani 42'; Kendouci 76'; Bakrar 78'	Soccerway report	Belkaroui 30'	Stadium: Stade 8 Mai 1945; Attendance: 0 (close doors); Referee: Lyés Bekouassa

12 February 2021 Round 13	MC Oran	6–0	US Biskra	Oran
15:00	Hamidi 32'; Guenina 48'; Benamar 50'; Motrani 71'; Bentiba 85'; Belloumi 90+1'	Soccerway report		Stadium: Ahmed Zabana Stadium; Attendance: 0 (close doors); Referee: Hamza Bouslimani

19 February 2021 Round 14	CS Constantine	1–3	MC Oran	El Khroub
14:30	Amokrane 72'	Soccerway report	Motrani 4'; Mesmoudi 32'; Belloumi 77'	Stadium: Stade Abed Hamdani; Attendance: 0 (close doors); Referee: Ahmed Bouzrar

27 February 2021 Round 15	MC Oran	3–1	Paradou AC	Oran
14:30	Mesmoudi 43'; Guenina 48', 66'	Soccerway report	Okello 85'	Stadium: Ahmed Zabana Stadium; Attendance: 0 (close doors); Referee: Abdelmoumen Touabti

6 March 2021 Round 16	JSM Skikda	0–1	MC Oran	Skikda
15:00		Soccerway report	Motrani 60'	Stadium: Stade 20 Août 1955; Attendance: 0 (close doors); Referee: Hamza Bouslimani

13 March 2021 Round 17	MC Oran	1–1	CA Bordj Bou Arreridj	Oran
15:00	Mellel 90+2'	Soccerway report	Rahmani 38'	Stadium: Ahmed Zabana Stadium; Attendance: 0 (close doors); Referee: Houssam Benyahia

17 March 2021 Round 18	MC Oran	0–0	AS Ain M'lila	Oran
15:00		Soccerway report		Stadium: Ahmed Zabana Stadium; Attendance: 0 (close doors); Referee: Amine Hansal

21 March 2021 Round 19	NC Magra	0–0	MC Oran	Magra
15:00		Soccerway report		Stadium: Boucheligue Brothers Stadium; Attendance: 0 (close doors); Referee: Farouk Mial

4 May 2021 Round 20	MC Oran	3–2	NA Hussein Dey	Oran
22:30	Motrani 3'; Mellel 24' (pen.); Guenina 38'	Soccerway report	Sebbah 19'; Banouh 53'	Stadium: Ahmed Zabana Stadium; Attendance: 0 (close doors); Referee: Houssam Benyahia

11 May 2021 Round 21	JS Kabylie	0–1	MC Oran	Tizi Ouzou
22:30		Soccerway report	Mellel 44' (pen.)	Stadium: Stade 1er Novembre 1954; Attendance: 0 (close doors); Referee: Youcef Gamouh

22 May 2021 Round 22	MC Oran	0–0	Olympique de Médéa	Oran
17:00		Soccerway report		Stadium: Ahmed Zabana Stadium; Attendance: 0 (close doors); Referee: Abdelali Ibrir

26 May 2021 Round 23	WA Tlemcen	0–2	MC Oran	Tlemcen
17:00		Soccerway report	Benhamou 29' (pen.); Belloumi 73'	Stadium: Stade Akid Lotfi; Attendance: 0 (close doors); Referee: Lahlou Benbraham

30 May 2021 Round 24	MC Oran	1–1	USM Bel Abbès	Oran
17:00	Nekkache 82'	Soccerway report	Ounnas 57'	Stadium: Ahmed Zabana Stadium; Attendance: 0 (close doors); Referee: Hamza Bouslimani

10 June 2021 Round 25	RC Relizane	2–1	MC Oran	Relizane
17:00	Aoued 17'; Feham 45+2'	Soccerway report	Nekkache 86'	Stadium: Stade Tahar Zoughari; Attendance: 0 (close doors); Referee: Youcef Gamouh

19 June 2021 Round 26	MC Oran	2–1	MC Alger	Oran
17:00	Benamar 38'; Nekkache 84'	Soccerway report	Tahar 83'	Stadium: Ahmed Zabana Stadium; Attendance: 0 (close doors); Referee: Said Aouina

27 June 2021 Round 27	MC Oran	0–3	CR Belouizdad	Oran
17:00		Soccerway report	Sayoud 48'; Belkhir 51'; Khalfallah 63'	Stadium: Ahmed Zabana Stadium; Attendance: 0 (close doors); Referee: Abdelali Ibrir

1 July 2021 Round 28	ASO Chlef	0–0	MC Oran	Chlef
17:00		Soccerway report		Stadium: Stade Mohamed Boumezrag; Attendance: 0 (close doors); Referee: Hamza Bouslimani

4 July 2021 Round 29	MC Oran	1–1	USM Alger	Oran
17:00	Benhamou 82'	Soccerway report	Belkacemi 11' (pen.)	Stadium: Ahmed Zabana Stadium; Attendance: 0 (close doors); Referee: Youcef Gamouh

8 July 2021 Round 30	JS Saoura	1–1	MC Oran	Béchar
18:00	Hamidi 45+3'	Soccerway report	Khettab 57'	Stadium: Stade 20 Août 1955; Attendance: 0 (close doors); Referee: Amine Sekhraoui

13 July 2021 Round 31	MC Oran	4–0	ES Sétif	Oran
21:00	Motrani 19', 69'; Benhamou 43'; Khettab 90'	Soccerway report		Stadium: Ahmed Zabana Stadium; Attendance: 0 (close doors); Referee: Lyés Bekouassa

17 July 2021 Round 32	US Biskra	1–0	MC Oran	Biskra
20:30	Mokhtar 88' (pen.)	Soccerway report		Stadium: Stade du 18 Février; Attendance: 0 (close doors); Referee: Lotfi Bekouassa

23 July 2021 Round 33	MC Oran	0–0	CS Constantine	Oran
21:00		Soccerway report		Stadium: Ahmed Zabana Stadium; Attendance: 0 (close doors); Referee: Ahmed Bouzrar

27 July 2021 Round 34	Paradou AC	5–4	MC Oran	Dar El Beïda
17:45	Bouguerra 9'; Zerrouki 47', 55', 68'; Boucif 88'	Soccerway report	Nekkache 72', 87'; Naâmani 84'; Khettab 90+4'	Stadium: Omar Benrabah Stadium; Attendance: 0 (close doors); Referee: Abdelali Ibrir

9 August 2021 Round 35	MC Oran	1–0	JSM Skikda	Oran
21:00	Freifer 56'	Soccerway report		Stadium: Ahmed Zabana Stadium; Attendance: 0 (close doors); Referee: Mohamed Kralfa

16 August 2021 Round 36	CA Bordj Bou Arreridj	0–2	MC Oran	Bordj Bou Arréridj
17:30		Soccerway report	Freifer 30'; Chaouti 45+4' (pen.)	Stadium: Stade 20 Août 1955; Attendance: 0 (close doors); Referee: Anes Azrine

21 August 2021 Round 37	AS Ain M'lila	2–1	MC Oran	Aïn M'lila
17:30	Tiaïba 29', 48'	Soccerway report	Ezzemani 72'	Stadium: Touhami Zoubir Khelifi Stadium; Attendance: 0 (close doors); Referee: Malek Ait Ameur

24 August 2021 Round 38	MC Oran	1–2	NC Magra	Oran
21:00	Reguig 90'	Soccerway report	Demane 17'; Belhamri 76'	Stadium: Ahmed Zabana Stadium; Attendance: 0 (close doors); Referee: Belhachemi

== Algerian League Cup ==
16 April 2021 Preliminary round	CA Bordj Bou Arréridj	0–0 (a.e.t.) (2–3 p)	MC Oran	Bordj Bou Arréridj
22:30		Report		Stadium: Stade 20 Août 1955; Attendance: 0 (close doors); Referee: Youcef Gamouh
	Penalties
	Sebie (penalty missed); Hammouche (penalty scored); Bousmaha (penalty missed); Rahba (penalty scored); Gagaâ (penalty missed)		(penalty scored) Ezzemani; (penalty missed) Bentiba; (penalty scored) Guertil; (penalty scored) Fourloul
Note: Lineup for MC Oran - Litim, Fourloul, Naâmani, Ezzemani, Benamar (Guertil, 98'), Boutiche (Bounoua, 61'), Benamara, Guenina (Bentiba, 98'), Khettab (Belloumi, 69'), Hamidi, Benhamou (Siam, 46').

30 April 2021 Round of 16	RC Relizane	0–1	MC Oran	Relizane
15:30			Mellal 45'	Stadium: Stade Tahar Zoughari; Attendance: 0 (close doors); Referee: Lotfi Bekouassa
Note: Lineup for MC Oran - Litim, Fourloul (Hamidi, 46'), Ezzemani, Naâmani, Benali, Benamara, Lagraâ (Boutiche, 46'), Mellal (Bounoua, 86'), Motrani (Belloumi, 46'), Nekkache, Freifer (Guenina, 70').

5 June 2021 Quarter-finals	MC Oran	0–0 (a.e.t.) (1–4 p)	WA Tlemcen	Oran
17:00		Report		Stadium: Ahmed Zabana Stadium; Attendance: 0 (close doors); Referee: Mehdi Abid Charef
	Penalties
	Motrani (penalty scored); Ezzemani (penalty missed); Bounoua (penalty missed)		(penalty scored) Aichi; (penalty scored) Amiri; (penalty scored) Nezouani; (penalty scored) Belaribi

== Squad information ==
=== Playing statistics ===
No.	Pos	Nat	Player	Total		Ligue 1		League Cup	
No.	Pos	Nat	Player	Apps	Goals	Apps	Goals	Apps	Goals
Goalkeepers
1	GK	(Algeria) ALG	Houssam Limane	0	0	0	0	0	0
16	GK	(Algeria) ALG	Oussama Litim	0	0	0	0	0	0
	GK	(Algeria) ALG	[[]]	0	0	0	0	0	0
Defenders
2	DF	(Algeria) ALG	Benali Benamar	0	0	0	0	0	0
3	DF	(Algeria) ALG	Boualem Mesmoudi	0	0	0	0	0	0
4	DF	(Algeria) ALG	Mohamed Naâmani	0	0	0	0	0	0
13	DF	(Algeria) ALG	Mohamed Amine Ezzemani	0	0	0	0	0	0
21	DF	(Algeria) ALG	Zineddine Mekkaoui	0	0	0	0	0	0
24	DF	(Algeria) ALG	Senoussi Fourloul	0	0	0	0	0	0
26	DF	(Algeria) ALG	Hichem Belkaroui	0	0	0	0	0	0
27	DF	(Algeria) ALG	Kamel Hamidi	0	0	0	0	0	0
Midfielders
5	MF	(Algeria) ALG	Abdelkader Boutiche	0	0	0	0	0	0
6	MF	(Algeria) ALG	Mohamed Lagraâ	0	0	0	0	0	0
8	MF	(Algeria) ALG	Bassem Chaouti	0	0	0	0	0	0
17	MF	(Algeria) ALG	Walid Derardja	0	0	0	0	0	0
18	MF	(Algeria) ALG	Mohamed Bentiba	0	0	0	0	0	0
20	MF	(Algeria) ALG	Benamar Mellal	0	0	0	0	0	0
22	MF	(Algeria) ALG	Youcef Guertil	0	0	0	0	0	0
23	MF	(Algeria) ALG	Abdelhafid Benamara	0	0	0	0	0	0
62	MF	(Algeria) ALG	Bachir Belloumi	0	0	0	0	0	0
Forwards
7	FW	(Algeria) ALG	Zoubir Motrani	0	0	0	0	0	0
9	FW	(Algeria) ALG	Abdelhakim Berrezoug	0	0	0	0	0	0
10	FW	(Algeria) ALG	Boumediene Freifer	0	0	0	0	0	0
11	FW	(Algeria) ALG	Hichem Nekkache	0	0	0	0	0	0
12	FW	(Algeria) ALG	Abdelkrim Benrabah	0	0	0	0	0	0
14	FW	(Algeria) ALG	Yacine Guenina	0	0	0	0	0	0
15	FW	(Algeria) ALG	Chérif Siam	0	0	0	0	0	0
19	FW	(Algeria) ALG	Mahi Benhamou	0	0	0	0	0	0
25	FW	(Algeria) ALG	Adel Khettab	0	0	0	0	0	0
38	FW	(Algeria) ALG	Adel Ghrib	0	0	0	0	0	0
Players transferred out during the season

Last updated: 27 November 2020
Source: fr.soccerway.com

=== Goalscorers ===
Includes all competitive matches. The list is sorted alphabetically by surname when total goals are equal.

== Transfers ==
=== In ===
Date	Pos	Player	From club	Transfer fee	Source
25 August 2020	GK	(Algeria) Houssem Limane	(Algeria) CS Constantine	Free transfer	
25 August 2020	FW	(Algeria) Adel Khettab	(Algeria) WA Boufarik	Free transfer	
1 September 2020	FW	(Algeria) Hichem Nekkache	(Algeria) MC Alger	Free transfer	
2 September 2020	DF	(Algeria) Mohamed Naâmani	(Saudi Arabia) Al-Fateh SC	Free transfer	
6 September 2020	FW	(Algeria) Walid Derrardja	(Algeria) MC Alger	Free transfer	
17 September 2020	DF	(Algeria) Benali Benamar	(Algeria) Olympique de Médéa	Free transfer	
22 September 2020	CB	(Algeria) Hicham Belkaroui	(Algeria) USM Alger	Free transfer	

=== Out ===
Date	Pos	Player	To club	Transfer fee	Source
7 September 2020	DF	(Algeria) Zine El-Abidine Sebbah	(Algeria) NA Hussein Dey	Free transfer	
9 September 2020	MF	(Algeria) Abderraouf Chouiter	(Algeria) NA Hussein Dey	Free transfer	
10 September 2020	FW	(Algeria) Rachid Nadji	(Algeria) NA Hussein Dey	Free transfer	
16 September 2020	FW	(Algeria) Abdelhak Abdelhafid	(Algeria) MC Alger	Free transfer	

=== New contracts ===
No.	Pos	Player	Contract length	Contract end	Date	Source
7	MF	(Algeria) Zoubir Motrani	3 years	2023	18 September 2020	
