= Ricardo Velho =

Portuguese footballer (born 1998)

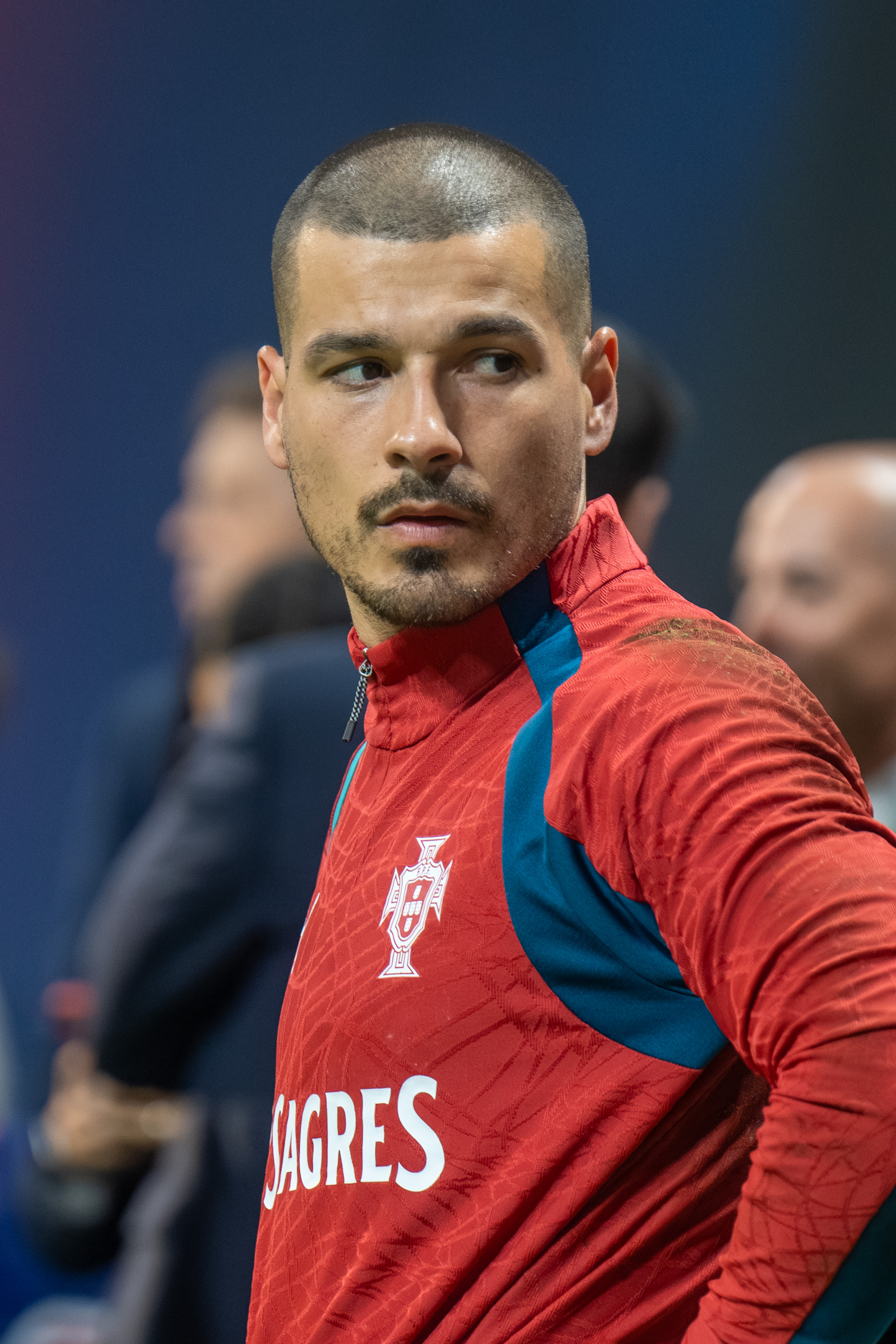
- Velho with Portugal in 2026

Personal information
- Full name: Mário Ricardo da Silva Velho
- Date of birth: 20 August 1998 (age 28)
- Place of birth: Famalicão, Portugal
- Height: 1.88 m (6 ft 2 in)
- Position: Goalkeeper

Team information
- Current team: Aris
- Number: 33

Youth career
- 2006–2007: Vitória Guimarães
- 2007–2009: Porto
- 2009–2010: Salgueiros
- 2010–2012: Trofense
- 2012–2013: Braga
- 2013–2014: Palmeiras Braga
- 2014–2017: Braga

Senior career*
Years	Team	Apps	(Gls)
2017–2020	Braga B	11	(0)
2020–2026	Farense	97	(0)
2025–2026	→ Gençlerbirliği (loan)	23	(0)
2026–	Aris	5	(0)

International career^{‡}
2026–	Portugal	1	(0)
- * Club domestic league appearances and goals as of 22:00, 19 September 2026 (UTC) ‡ National team caps and goals as of 01:05, 1 April 2026 (UTC)

Mário Ricardo da Silva Velho (born 20 August 1998) is a Portuguese professional footballer who plays as a goalkeeper for Super League Greece club Aris and the Portugal national team.

== Club career ==
=== Braga ===
Born in Vila Nova de Famalicão, Braga District, Velho joined Braga's academy when he was 14. On 23 August 2017, he made his professional debut with the reserve team in a 2–1 away loss against Penafiel in the LigaPro.

During his spell, Velho played second-fiddle to Tiago Sá (who later appeared in several matches for the main squad) and Rogério Santos.

=== Farense ===
On 31 July 2020, Velho signed a two-year contract with Primeira Liga club Farense. In the 2022–23 season, he contributed 22 games as his side finished runners-up and returned to the main division after a two-year absence, while they conceded a league-best 34 goals; subsequently, he agreed to an extension until June 2026.

Velho's maiden appearance in the top flight took place on 12 August 2023, in a 0–3 home defeat to Casa Pia. Due to his performances, which included a league-best 143 saves and seven clean sheets with Farense finishing tenth, he was voted the campaign's Goalkeeper of the Year.

In summer 2024, Velho was linked with a move to Benfica, but the deal fell through when Farense demanded that his €10 million buyout clause be paid. This led to him agreeing to extend his contract until 2028.

Velho missed the final month of 2024–25, due to a knee ligament injury that required surgery. His team would be ultimately relegated as second-bottom.

Shortly after the start of the following season, Velho was loaned to Gençlerbirliği with an option to buy. He only made his Süper Lig debut on 7 November, in a 2–1 home win over İstanbul Başakşehir; manager Volkan Demirel later disclosed that he was fielded because the Turkish club would have to pay €200.000 in compensation if he did not take part in the required number of matches in the first half of the campaign.

=== Aris ===
On 18 August 2026, Velho joined Super League Greece side Aris Thessaloniki on a four-year deal.

== International career ==
Velho was not capped by Portugal at any youth level. On 4 October 2024, he was called by the senior team for matches against Poland and Scotland in the UEFA Nations League.

On 31 March 2026, Velho made his full debut, coming on as an 85th-minute substitute for José Sá in a 2–0 friendly victory over the United States in Atlanta. He was selected for the year's FIFA World Cup as an emergency-only fourth goalkeeper.

== Career statistics ==
=== Club ===
As of match played 17 May 2026

Appearances and goals by club, season and competition
Club	Season	League			National cup		League cup		Total	
Club	Season	Division	Apps	Goals	Apps	Goals	Apps	Goals	Apps	Goals
Braga B	2017–18	LigaPro	2	0	—		—		2	0
Braga B	2018–19	LigaPro	0	0	—		—		0	0
Braga B	2019–20	Campeonato de Portugal	9	0	—		—		9	0
Braga B	Total		11	0	—		—		11	0
Farense	2020–21	Primeira Liga	0	0	0	0	—		0	0
Farense	2021–22	Liga Portugal 2	12	0	3	0	0	0	15	0
Farense	2022–23	Liga Portugal 2	22	0	0	0	1	0	23	0
Farense	2023–24	Primeira Liga	32	0	0	0	3	0	35	0
Farense	2024–25	Primeira Liga	28	0	2	0	—		30	0
Farense	2025–26	Liga Portugal 2	3	0	—		—		3	0
Farense	Total		97	0	5	0	4	0	106	0
Gençlerbirliği (loan)	2025–26	Süper Lig	23	0	1	0	—		24	0
Career total			131	0	6	0	4	0	141	0

== Honours ==
Individual

- Primeira Liga Goalkeeper of the Season: 2023–24
- Primeira Liga Team of the Year: 2023–24
