= Lucas Áfrico =

Brazilian footballer (born 1995)

Personal information
- Full name: Lucas Henrique da Silva
- Date of birth: 5 February 1995 (age 31)
- Place of birth: São Paulo, Brazil
- Height: 1.89 m (6 ft 2 in)
- Position: Centre-back

Team information
- Current team: Kairat
- Number: 45

Youth career
- 2012–2014: São Bernardo

Senior career*
Years	Team	Apps	(Gls)
2015	Flamengo-SP	7	(0)
2016–2017	Santos	0	(0)
2018	Londrina	2	(0)
2018–2019	Marítimo B	1	(0)
2018–2021	Marítimo	37	(2)
2019–2020	→ Estoril (loan)	19	(0)
2021–2023	Estoril	17	(0)
2023–2024	Gabala	30	(1)
2024–2025	Farense	21	(1)
2025–2026	Vanspor	11	(0)
2026–	Kairat	18	(1)
- * Club domestic league appearances and goals as of 17 September 2026

Lucas Henrique da Silva (born 5 February 1995), known as Lucas Áfrico, is a Brazilian professional footballer who plays as a centre-back for Kazakhstan Premier League club FC Kairat.

== Football career ==
=== Flamengo-SP ===
Lucas Áfrico made his league debut for Flamengo-SP against Santacruzense on 1 February 2015.

=== Santos ===
Lucas Áfrico made his Copa Paulista for Santos against Joseense on 4 July 2016. He scored his first goal for the club in the Copa Paulista, scoring against RB Bragantino on 15 October 2016, scoring in the 14th minute.

=== Londrina ===
Lucas Áfrico made his league debut for Londrina against Foz do Iguaçu on 21 January 2018.

=== Marítimo ===
On 27 June 2018, Lucas Áfrico signed a five-year contract with Marítimo. He made his debut for the club against Santa Clara on 12 August 2018. Lucas Áfrico scored his first goal for the club against Chaves on 24 August 2018, scoring in the 90th+5th minute.

He also played for Marítimo II, making his debut for the club against Penalva Castelo on 24 March 2019.

=== Loan to Estoril ===
Lucas Áfrico made his league debut for Estoril against FC Porto B on 14 September 2019.

=== Estoril ===
On 2 July 2021, he returned to Estoril on a permanent basis, after playing there on loan earlier. During his second spell with the club, Lucas Áfrico made his league debut against Arouca on 7 August 2021.

=== Gabala ===
On 2 July 2023, Gabala announced the signing of Áfrico from Estoril to a one-year contract with the option of a second. Áfrico made his league debut for Gabala against Sabah on 6 August 2023. He scored his first goal for the club against Qarabağ on 25 September 2023, scoring in the 76th minute.

On 27 May 2024, Gabala announced that Áfrico and five others had left the club with their contracts expiring.

=== Kairat ===
On 16 January 2026, he was signed on a free transfer by the Kazakh club Kairat, with a contract running until 26 December 2026.

== Career statistics ==
=== Club ===
As of match played 17 September 2026

Club	Season	League			National cup		League cup		Continental		Other		Total	
Club	Season	Division	Apps	Goals	Apps	Goals	Apps	Goals	Apps	Goals	Apps	Goals	Apps	Goals
Marítimo	2018–19	Primeira Liga	20	1	1	0	2	0	—		—		23	1
Marítimo	2019–20	Primeira Liga	0	0	0	0	0	0	—		—		0	0
Marítimo	2020–21	Primeira Liga	17	1	2	0	0	0	—		—		19	1
Marítimo	Total		37	2	3	0	2	0	—		—		42	2
Estoril (loan)	2019–20	LigaPro	19	0	0	0	0	0	—		—		19	0
Estoril	2021–22	Primeira Liga	11	0	0	0	2	0	—		—		13	0
Estoril	2022–23	Primeira Liga	6	0	1	0	1	0	—		—		8	0
Estoril	Total		17	0	1	0	3	0	—		—		21	0
Gabala	2023–24	Azerbaijan Premier League	30	1	3	0	—		2 (Note: Appearances in the UEFA Europa Conference League)	1	—		35	1
Farense	2024–25	Primeira Liga	21	0	2	0	—		—		—		23	0
Vanspor	2025–26	TFF 1. Lig	11	0	1	0	—		—		—		12	0
Kairat	2026	Kazakhstan Premier League	18	1	0	0	—		7 (Note: Six appearances in UEFA Champions League, one appearance in UEFA Europa League)	0	—		25	1
Career total			153	4	10	0	5	0	9	0	—		177	4
