= Marco Matias (footballer) =

Portuguese footballer (born 1989)

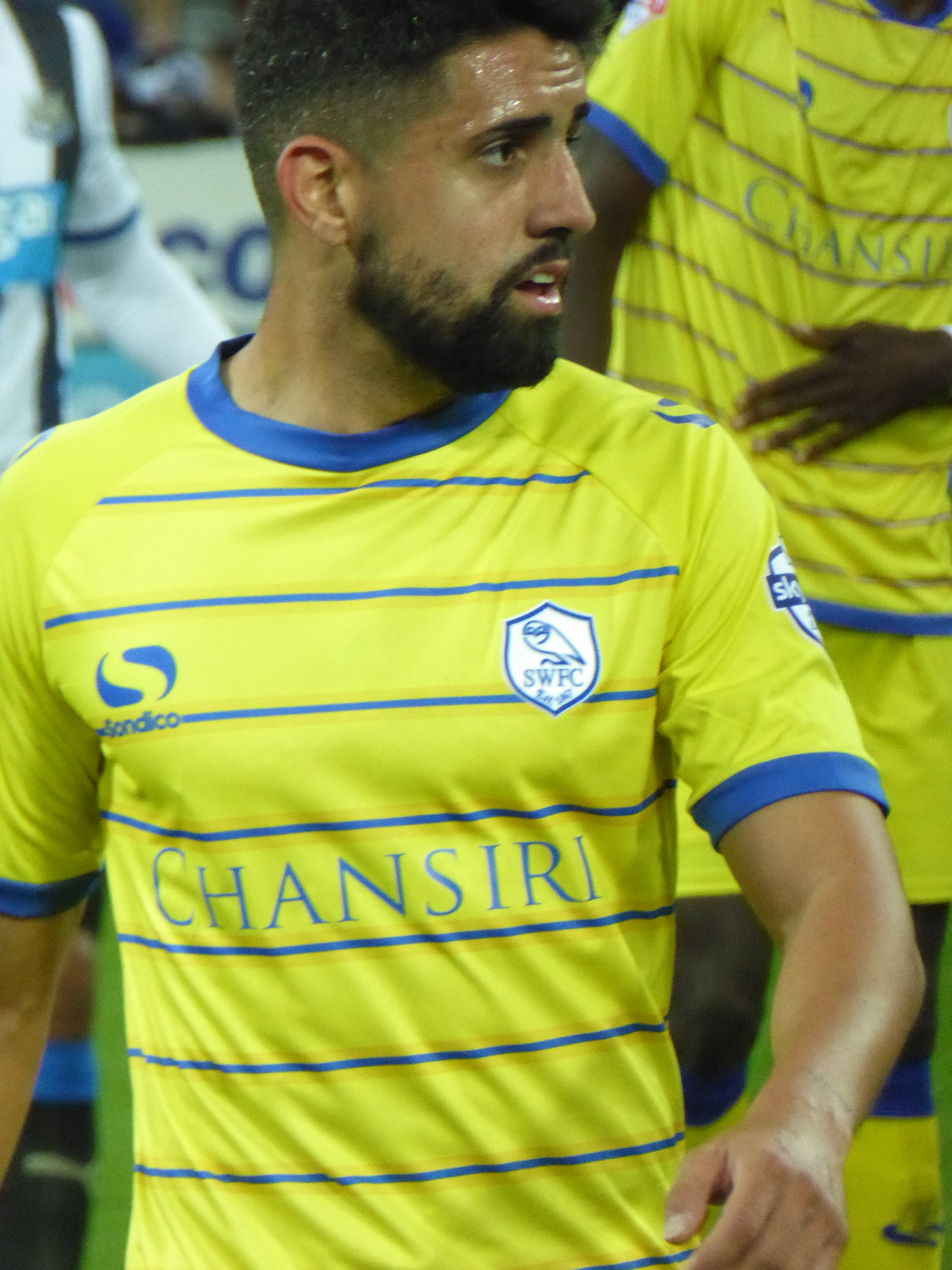
- Matias playing for Sheffield Wednesday in 2015

Personal information
- Full name: Marco André da Silva Lopes Matias
- Date of birth: 10 May 1989 (age 37)
- Place of birth: Barreiro, Portugal
- Height: 1.77 m (5 ft 10 in)
- Position: Winger

Youth career
- 1998–2001: Barreirense
- 2001–2008: Sporting CP

Senior career*
Years	Team	Apps	(Gls)
2008–2010	Sporting CP	0	(0)
2008–2009	→ Varzim (loan)	12	(0)
2009	→ Fátima (loan)	7	(2)
2010	→ Real Massamá (loan)	15	(0)
2010–2014	Vitória Guimarães	42	(6)
2010–2012	→ Freamunde (loan)	43	(7)
2012–2013	Vitória Guimarães B	8	(2)
2014–2015	Nacional	33	(17)
2015–2019	Sheffield Wednesday	60	(9)
2019–2020	B-SAD	27	(1)
2021–2022	Nacional	39	(5)
2022–2026	Farense	112	(11)

International career
2007	Portugal U18	4	(1)
2007–2008	Portugal U19	13	(1)
2009	Portugal U21	5	(0)
- * Club domestic league appearances and goals as of 20 June 2026

Marco André da Silva Lopes Matias (born 10 May 1989) is a Portuguese professional footballer who plays as a winger.

== Club career ==
=== Portugal ===
Born in Barreiro, Setúbal District, Matias finished his youth career at Sporting CP. He never represented the first team officially as a senior, being consecutively loaned to Varzim SC, C.D. Fátima and Real SC, with all the clubs but the third competing in the Segunda Liga.

Matias signed with Vitória S.C. in the summer of 2010, being immediately loaned to S.C. Freamunde of the second division for two years. He subsequently returned to Guimarães, making his debut in the Primeira Liga on 19 August 2012 by coming on as a 62nd-minute substitute in a 0–0 home draw against Sporting, and finished his first season with 20 scoreless appearances.

Matias scored his first goal in the Portuguese top flight on 31 August 2013, but in a 1–4 home loss to Vitória de Setúbal. On 19 July 2014 he joined C.D. Nacional of the same league, netting 21 times from 42 competitive games to help the Madeirans to the seventh position.

=== Sheffield Wednesday ===
In July 2015, Matias signed a four-year deal with Championship club Sheffield Wednesday. His first goal came in his fourth league appearance on 22 August, the 1–1 draw against Leeds United – a volley from 18 yards that flew in off the underside of the bar.

Matias was released at the end of the 2018–19 season. His spell at the Hillsborough Stadium was bothered by several injury problems.

=== Return to Nacional ===
On 26 January 2021, Matias returned to Nacional on a five-month contract, from fellow top-tier side B-SAD.

== International career ==
Matias won five caps for the Portugal under-21 team. His first came on 11 July 2009, as he played the full 90 minutes in a 1–0 loss against Cape Verde in the Lusofonia Games.

== Career statistics ==
As of match played 4 April 2026

Appearances and goals by club, season and competition
Club	Season	League			National cup (Note: Includes Taça de Portugal, FA Cup)		League cup (Note: Includes Taça da Liga, EFL Cup)		Continental		Other		Total	
Club	Season	Division	Apps	Goals	Apps	Goals	Apps	Goals	Apps	Goals	Apps	Goals	Apps	Goals
Sporting CP	2008–09	Primeira Liga	0	0	0	0	0	0	0	0	0	0	0	0
Varzim (loan)	2008–09	Liga de Honra	12	0	2	0	2	0	—		—		16	0
Fátima (loan)	2009–10	Liga de Honra	7	2	2	0	3	0	—		—		12	2
Real SC (loan)	2009–10	Segunda Divisão	15	0	0	0	—		—		—		15	0
Vitória Guimarães	2010–11	Primeira Liga	0	0	0	0	0	0	—		—		0	0
Vitória Guimarães	2012–13	Primeira Liga	20	0	5	1	2	1	—		—		27	2
Vitória Guimarães	2013–14	Primeira Liga	22	6	1	0	0	0	5 (Note: Appearances in UEFA Europa League)	0	1 (Note: Appearance in Supertaça Cândido de Oliveira)	0	29	6
Vitória Guimarães	Total		42	6	6	1	2	1	5	0	1	0	56	8
Freamunde (loan)	2010–11	Liga de Honra	24	5	0	0	2	1	—		—		26	6
Freamunde (loan)	2011–12	Liga de Honra	19	2	0	0	2	1	—		—		21	3
Freamunde (loan)	Total		43	7	0	0	4	2	—		—		47	9
Vitória Guimarães B	2012–13	Segunda Liga	8	2	—		—		—		—		8	2
Nacional	2014–15	Primeira Liga	33	17	6	3	1	0	2	1	—		42	21
Sheffield Wednesday	2015–16	Championship	18	3	1	0	3	0	—		—		22	3
Sheffield Wednesday	2016–17	Championship	2	0	0	0	0	0	—		—		2	0
Sheffield Wednesday	2017–18	Championship	9	0	3	1	2	0	—		—		14	1
Sheffield Wednesday	2018–19	Championship	31	6	2	0	1	1	—		—		34	7
Sheffield Wednesday	Total		60	9	6	1	6	1	—		—		72	11
B-SAD	2019–20	Primeira Liga	27	1	2	0	0	0	—		—		29	1
Nacional	2020–21	Primeira Liga	9	0	0	0	—		—		—		9	0
Nacional	2021–22	Liga Portugal 2	30	5	1	0	0	0	—		—		31	5
Nacional	Total		39	5	1	0	0	0	—		—		40	5
Farense	2022–23	Liga Portugal 2	31	5	2	2	3	0	—		—		36	7
Farense	2023–24	Primeira Liga	33	2	1	0	4	1	—		—		38	3
Farense	2024–25	Primeira Liga	27	3	2	0	—		—		—		29	3
Farense	2025–26	Liga Portugal 2	21	1	0	0	—		—		—		21	1
Farense	Total		112	11	5	2	7	1	—		—		124	14
Career total			398	60	30	7	25	5	7	1	1	0	461	73

== Honours ==
Vitória Guimarães

- Taça de Portugal: 2012–13

Individual

- Liga Portugal 2 Team of the Season: 2022–23
- Liga Portugal 2 Player of the Month: April 2023
- Liga Portugal 2 Forward of the Month: April 2023
