= Facundo Cáseres =

Argentine professional footballer

Personal information
- Full name: Facundo Agustín Cáseres
- Date of birth: 28 May 2001 (age 25)
- Place of birth: Arteaga, Argentina
- Height: 1.78 m (5 ft 10 in)
- Position: Midfielder

Team information
- Current team: Santos Laguna
- Number: 23

Youth career
- 2014–2020: Vélez Sarsfield

Senior career*
Years	Team	Apps	(Gls)
2020–2023	Vélez Sarsfield	3	(0)
2021–2023	→ Istra 1961 (loan)	50	(4)
2023–2024	Farense	21	(0)
2024–2026	Gil Vicente	52	(0)
2026–	Santos Laguna	0	(0)
- * Club domestic league appearances and goals as of 4 September 2026

Facundo Agustín Cáseres (born 28 May 2001) is an Argentine professional footballer who plays as a midfielder for Liga MX club Santos Laguna.

== Career ==
Born in Arteaga, Cáseres joined the academy of Vélez Sarsfield in 2014. He was promoted into their senior set-up in early 2019, though wouldn't make an appearance on a competitive first-team teamsheet until October 2020. He was an unused substitute for a Copa Sudamericana draw with Peñarol on 28 October, which preceded his senior bow arriving on 31 October in a 1–1 draw at home to Huracán in the Copa de la Liga Profesional; he started and remained for 64 minutes, before being substituted for Lucas Janson.

In August 2021, Cáseres was introduced as a new player of the Croatian club NK Istra 1961, on a one-year loan from Vélez Sarsfield. On 26 July 2022, Veléz confirmed that the loan spell had been extended with one year further.

On 30 August 2023, recently promoted to Primeira Liga side Farense announced the signing of Cáseres. The duration of the contract was undisclosed.

On 23 July 2024, Cáseres moved to Gil Vicente on a one-year deal.

On 4 September 2026, Cáseres signed with Santos Laguna.

== Career statistics ==
As of match played on 27 May 2023.

Appearances and goals by club, season and competition
Club	Season	League			National cup		League cup		Continental		Total	
Club	Season	Division	Apps	Goals	Apps	Goals	Apps	Goals	Apps	Goals	Apps	Goals
Vélez Sarsfield	2020–21 (Note: Soccerway counts Copa de la Liga Profesional appearances as league appearances.)	Primera División	3	0	0	0	0	0	0	0	3	0
Istra 1961 (loan)	2021–22	Prva HNL	17	2	1	0	—		—		18	2
Istra 1961 (loan)	2022–23	HNL	33	2	2	0	—		—		35	2
Istra 1961 (loan)	Total		50	4	3	0	—		—		53	4
Farense	2023–24	Primeira Liga	0	0	0	0	0	0	—		0	0
Career total			53	4	3	0	0	0	0	0	56	4
