= Mattheus Oliveira =

Brazilian footballer (born 1994)

Personal information
- Full name: Mattheus de Andrade Gama de Oliveira
- Date of birth: 7 July 1994 (age 32)
- Place of birth: Rio de Janeiro, Brazil
- Height: 1.82 m (5 ft 11 1/2 in)
- Position: Attacking midfielder

Team information
- Current team: Farense

Youth career
- 2006–2013: Flamengo

Senior career*
Years	Team	Apps	(Gls)
2012–2016	Flamengo	19	(0)
2015–2016	→ Estoril (loan)	26	(4)
2016–2017	Estoril	26	(2)
2017–2021	Sporting CP	0	(0)
2018	→ Vitória SC (loan)	14	(0)
2018–2019	→ Vitória SC (loan)	23	(3)
2020–2021	→ Coritiba (loan)	12	(1)
2022	Mafra	24	(0)
2023–2024	Farense	49	(8)
2024–2025	Khor Fakkan	14	(2)
2025	Al-Nasr	12	(2)
2026	Tampa Bay Rowdies	9	(2)
2026–	Farense	0	(0)

International career^{‡}
2013	Brazil U20	4	(0)
- * Club domestic league appearances and goals as of 16 July 2026 ‡ National team caps and goals as of 23:28, 30 September 2023 (UTC)

Mattheus de Andrade Gama de Oliveira, also known as Mattheus Oliveira or Mattheus (born 7 July 1994), is a Brazilian footballer who plays as an attacking midfielder for Liga Portugal 2 side Sporting Club Farense.

== Early life ==
Oliveira is the son of former Brazilian player Bebeto, and became widely known just days after his birth due to his father's 'cradle-rocking' celebration on scoring a crucial goal against the Netherlands in the 1994 FIFA World Cup quarterfinals.

== Career ==
=== Flamengo ===
Oliveira made his professional debut for Flamengo on 3 February 2012, as a 77th-minute substitute for Lucas Quintino in a goalless home Campeonato Carioca match against Olaria; it was his only appearance of the season. On 17 June, he made his Campeonato Brasileiro Série A debut, coming on in added time for Ibson in a 1–0 home win over Santos. He made 11 appearances in that campaign, with three starts, the first of which was a goalless draw against Portuguesa at the Estádio Olímpico Nilton Santos on 27 July.

Oliveira played five games as Flamengo won the 2014 Campeonato Carioca.

=== Estoril ===
On 30 January 2015, Oliveira was loaned to Estoril in Portugal's Primeira Liga. He began playing regularly in 2015–16, scoring his first professional goals on 7 March with two in a 3–1 win at Rio Ave, and repeated the feat 13 days later in a 3–0 win at Académica de Coimbra.

=== Sporting ===
In May 2017, Oliveira signed a five-year deal with Sporting CP. The buyout clause was set at €60 million. In November 2020, the €2 million transfer fee was investigated by Portuguese courts for being double the player's valuation by the website Transfermarkt.

Oliveira made his Sporting debut on 19 September 2017 in a goalless Taça da Liga group game at home to Marítimo, as a starter. He also made a brief appearance in the Taça de Portugal against Famalicão and played one game in the UEFA Champions League in November against Olympiacos.

On 23 January 2018, Oliveira was loaned to fellow Primeira Liga club Vitória SC for the rest of the season. At the end of the campaign, he returned to Sporting, but, at the start of the 2018–19 season, rejoined Vitória on another season-long loan from Sporting.

Oliveira returned to his homeland's top flight on 30 September 2020, being lent to Coritiba until the following June. He played 12 games for the Coxo, scoring once at the end of a 3–1 loss on his return to Flamengo on 21 November. He missed the 2021 Campeonato Paranaense with a thigh injury.

Oliveira cancelled his contract with Sporting by mutual consent in September 2021.

=== Mafra ===
On 25 January 2022, Oliveira signed an 18-month deal with Liga Portugal 2 outfit Mafra.

=== Farense ===
In January 2023, Oliveira signed with Farense in Liga Portugal 2. At the end of the season, the Faro club finished second in the league, achieving promotion to the Primeira Liga.

On 30 September 2023, in a Primeira Liga match at the Estádio de São Luís, Oliveira scored two free kicks against his former club Sporting CP, with Farense losing by 2–3.

=== Tampa Bay Rowdies ===
On 18 March, 2026, Tampa Bay Rowdies of the USL Championship announced they had signed Oliveira to a contract for the 2026 season. In July, 2026 Mattheus and Tampa Bay Rowdies reached a mutual agreement allowing Matheus to return to Farense in Liga Portugal 2.

== Career statistics ==
As of match played 11 July 2026

Appearances and goals by club, season and competition
Club	Season	League			State league		National cup (Note: Appearances in Copa do Brasil, Taça de Portugal, and UAE President's Cup)		League cup		Continental		Total	
Club	Season	Division	Apps	Goals	Apps	Goals	Apps	Goals	Apps	Goals	Apps	Goals	Apps	Goals
Flamengo	2012	Série A	11	0	1 (Note: Appearance(s) in Campeonato Carioca)	0	—		—		0	0	12	0
Flamengo	2013	Série A	0	0	0	0	0	0	—		—		0	0
Flamengo	2014	Série A	2	0	5	0	1	0	—		0	0	8	0
Flamengo	Total		13	0	6	0	1	0	—		0	0	20	0
Estoril (loan)	2014–15	Primeira Liga	4	0	—		0	0	0	0	0	0	4	0
Estoril (loan)	2015–16	Primeira Liga	22	4	—		3	0	0	0	—		25	4
Estoril (loan)	Total		26	4	—		3	0	0	0	0	0	29	4
Estoril	2016–17	Primeira Liga	26	2	—		5	0	1 (Note: Appearances in Taça da Liga)	0	—		32	2
Sporting CP	2017–18	Primeira Liga	0	0	—		2	1	1	0	1 (Note: Appearance(s) in UEFA Champions League)	0	4	1
Sporting CP	2019–20	Primeira Liga	0	0	—		0	0	0	0	0	0	0	0
Sporting CP	2020–21	Primeira Liga	0	0	—		0	0	0	0	0	0	0	0
Sporting CP	Total		0	0	—		2	1	1	0	1	0	4	1
Vitória SC (loan)	2017–18	Primeira Liga	14	0	—		0	0	0	0	0	0	14	0
Vitória SC (loan)	2018–19	Primeira Liga	23	3	—		4	1	0	0	—		27	4
Vitória SC (loan)	Total		37	3	—		4	1	0	0	0	0	41	4
Coritiba (loan)	2020	Série A	12	1	0	0	0	0	—		—		12	1
Mafra	2021–22	Liga Portugal 2	14	0	—		2	0	0	0	—		16	0
Mafra	2022–23	Liga Portugal 2	10	0	—		2	0	2	0	—		14	0
Mafra	Total		24	0	—		4	0	2	0	—		30	0
Farense	2022–23	Liga Portugal 2	17	3	—		0	0	0	0	—		17	3
Farense	2023–24	Primeira Liga	26	4	—		1	0	4	2	—		31	6
Farense	Total		43	7	—		1	0	4	2	—		48	9
Khor Fakkan	2024–25	UAE Pro League	14	2	—		2	0	1 (Note: Appearances in UAE League Cup)	0	—		17	2
Al-Nasr SC	2024–25	UAE Pro League	11	2	—		0	0	0	0	2 (Note: Appearances in Gulf Club Champions League)	1	13	3
Tampa Bay Rowdies	2026	USL Championship	9	2	—		0	0	3 (Note: Appearances in USL Cup)	0	0	0	11	1
Career total			215	23	6	0	22	2	12	2	3	1	258	28

== Honours ==
Flamengo

- Campeonato Carioca: 2014
