= Lucas Cañizares =

Spanish footballer

Personal information
- Full name: Lucas Cañizares Conchello
- Date of birth: 10 May 2002 (age 24)
- Place of birth: Valencia, Spain
- Height: 1.88 m (6 ft 2 in)
- Position: Goalkeeper

Team information
- Current team: Tondela
- Number: 30

Youth career
- 2009–2010: Ciutat de Valencia
- 2010–2014: Alboraya
- 2014–2020: Real Madrid

Senior career*
| Years | Team | Apps | (Gls) |
| 2020–2024 | Real Madrid B | 32 | (0) |
| 2024–2025 | Farense | 0 | (0) |
| 2025 | → Feirense (loan) | 13 | (0) |
| 2025– | Tondela | 0 | (0) |

International career^{‡}
| 2018 | Spain U16 | 2 | (0) |
| 2018 | Spain U17 | 1 | (0) |
- * Club domestic league appearances and goals as of 31 August 2025 ‡ National team caps and goals as of 23 October 2018

Lucas Cañizares Conchello (born 10 May 2002) is a Spanish professional footballer who plays as a goalkeeper for Portuguese Primeira Liga club Tondela. He is a youth international for Spain.

== Club career ==
On 27 January 2025, Cañizares joined Liga Portugal 2 club Feirense on loan.

On 21 August 2025, Cañizares signed a three-season contract with Tondela in Primeira Liga.

== Personal life ==
Cañizares is the son of the retired footballer Santiago Cañizares.

== Career statistics ==
=== Club ===
As of match played 23 November 2025

Appearances and goals by club, season and competition
| Club | Season | League | | | Cup | | League cup | | Other | | Total | |
| Club | Season | Division | Apps | Goals | Apps | Goals | Apps | Goals | Apps | Goals | Apps | Goals |
|---|---|---|---|---|---|---|---|---|---|---|---|---|
| Real Madrid Castilla | 2021–22 | Primera División RFEF | 1 | 0 | — | | — | | — | | 1 | 0 |
| Real Madrid Castilla | 2022–23 | Primera Federación | 2 | 0 | — | | — | | 0 | 0 | 2 | 0 |
| Real Madrid Castilla | 2023–24 | Primera Federación | 29 | 0 | — | | — | | — | | 29 | 0 |
| Real Madrid Castilla | Total | | 32 | 0 | — | | — | | 0 | 0 | 32 | 0 |
| Farense | 2024–25 | Primeira Liga | 0 | 0 | 0 | 0 | — | | — | | 0 | 0 |
| Feirense (loan) | 2024–25 | Liga Portugal 2 | 13 | 0 | — | | — | | — | | 13 | 0 |
| Tondela | 2025–26 | Primeira Liga | 0 | 0 | 2 | 0 | 1 | 0 | — | | 3 | 0 |
| Career total | | | 45 | 0 | 2 | 0 | 1 | 0 | 0 | 0 | 48 | 0 |

== Honours ==
Real Madrid

- FIFA Club World Cup: 2022
- UEFA Champions League: 2023–24
