= Fran Delgado =

Spanish footballer

Personal information
- Full name: Francisco Javier Delgado Rojano
- Date of birth: 11 July 2001 (age 25)
- Place of birth: Écija, Spain
- Height: 1.77 m (5 ft 10 in)
- Position: Right-back

Youth career
- 2004–2011: Écija
- 2011–2017: Real Madrid
- 2017–2020: Betis

Senior career*
Years	Team	Apps	(Gls)
2018–2023	Betis B	81	(0)
2021–2023	Betis	1	(0)
2023–2026	Farense	15	(1)
2024–2025	→ Ceuta (loan)	11	(0)
- * Club domestic league appearances and goals as of 17 May 2026

Francisco "Fran" Javier Delgado Rojano (born 11 July 2001) is a Spanish professional footballer who plays as a right-back.

== Club career ==
Born in Écija, Seville, Andalusia, Delgado joined Real Madrid's La Fábrica in 2011, from hometown club Écija Balompié. He left the club in July 2017, and subsequently signed a three-year deal with Real Betis.

Delgado made his senior debut with the reserves on 19 December 2018, coming on as a late substitute in a 3–1 Tercera División away win against Conil CF. On 10 October 2020, he renewed his contract until 2024.

Delgado made his first team debut on 6 January 2021, replacing Emerson Royal late into a 1–3 away win against UD Mutilvera, for the season's Copa del Rey. His professional debut occurred eleven days later, as he again replaced Emerson in a 2–0 win at Sporting de Gijón, also for the national cup.

On 10 July, Portuguese club S.C. Farense, newly-promoted to the Primeira Liga, announced the signing of Delgado on a two-year contract, with an option for a further year.
