= Miguel Menino =

Portuguese footballer (born 2004)

Personal information
- Full name: Miguel Pedro Miranda Oliveira Menino
- Date of birth: 10 January 2003 (age 23)
- Place of birth: Almada, Portugal
- Height: 1.81 m (5 ft 11 in)
- Position: Midfielder

Team information
- Current team: Farense
- Number: 8

Youth career
- 2010–2021: Sporting CP

Senior career*
Years	Team	Apps	(Gls)
2021–2024	Sporting CP B	52	(6)
2024	Sporting CP	1	(0)
2024–	Farense	51	(3)

International career^{‡}
2018	Portugal U16	2	(0)
- * Club domestic league appearances and goals as of 20 May 2026 ‡ National team caps and goals as of 00:02, 28 May 2024 (UTC)

Miguel Pedro Miranda Oliveira Menino (born 10 January 2003) is a Portuguese professional footballer who plays as a midfielder for Liga Portugal 2 club Farense.

== Club career ==
Menino joined the youth academy of Sporting CP in 2010, and after a decade in their youth academy signed his first professional contract with the club on 8 January 2020. He was promoted to Sporting CP B in 2021, and on 16 December 2021 extended his contract with the club util 2025. He made his senior and professional debut with Sporting in a 1–0 Primeira Liga win over Estoril on 11 May 2024, and in doing was part of their championship in the 2023–24 Primeira Liga.

== International career ==
Menino is a youth international for Portugal, having played for the Portugal U16s in 2018.

== Honours ==
Sporting CP

- Primeira Liga: 2023–24

Individual

- Primeira Liga Goal of the Month: December 2024
