= Derick Poloni =

Brazilian footballer (born 1993)

Personal information
- Full name: Derick Theodoro Santos Poloni
- Date of birth: 1 September 1993 (age 33)
- Place of birth: Osasco, Brazil
- Height: 1.73 m (5 ft 8 in)
- Position: Left-back

Team information
- Current team: Farense
- Number: 6

Youth career
- 2011–2013: São Paulo
- 2013–2014: Académica

Senior career*
Years	Team	Apps	(Gls)
2014–2015	Sourense	43	(15)
2015–2017	Anadia	45	(3)
2017–2020	Leixões	84	(3)
2020–2023	Casa Pia	65	(2)
2023–2024	Eldense	25	(0)
2024–	Farense	53	(5)
- * Club domestic league appearances and goals as of 20 May 2026

Derick Theodoro Santos Poloni (born 1 September 1993) is a Brazilian professional footballer who plays as a left-back for Liga Portugal 2 club Farense.

== Professional career ==
Poloni is a youth product of the Brazilian clubs São Paulo, before moving to Portugal with Académica in 2013. He began his senior career with Sourense in the Portuguese third division in 2014. The following year, he moved to Anadia where he stayed for a couple of years. In 2017, he moved to the professional club Leixões in the LigaPro. In 2018, he was scouted by English Premier League club Arsenal. On 1 October 2020 he transferred to Casa Pia, and helped them achieve promotion to the Primeira Liga for the 2022-23 season.

On 19 August 2023, Poloni moved to Eldense of the Spanish Segunda División. On 30 August of the following year, he returned to Portugal with Farense.
