= Ângelo Neto =

Brazilian footballer

Personal information
- Full name: Ângelo Pelegrinelli Neto
- Date of birth: 2 September 1991 (age 35)
- Place of birth: Junqueirópolis, Brazil
- Height: 1.81 m (5 ft 11 in)
- Position: Midfielder

Team information
- Current team: Vizela
- Number: 31

Senior career*
Years	Team	Apps	(Gls)
2010–2011	Grêmio Barueri	8	(0)
2011	Iraty	6	(0)
2012	Linense	13	(1)
2013	Penapolense	22	(1)
2013	América (RN)	5	(0)
2014	Penapolense	21	(2)
2014	América (RN)	11	(0)
2015–2020	São Caetano	47	(11)
2016–2019	→ Moreirense (loan)	71	(1)
2019–2020	→ Al-Fayha (loan)	28	(1)
2020–2021	Juventude	10	(0)
2021	São Caetano	6	(0)
2021–2024	Casa Pia	86	(4)
2024–2025	Farense	24	(2)
2025–2026	Leixões	12	(0)
2026–	Vizela	5	(1)
- * Club domestic league appearances and goals as of 14 September 2026

Ângelo Pelegrinelli Neto (born 2 September 1991) is a Brazilian footballer who plays as a midfielder for Liga Portugal 2 club Vizela.

== Honours ==
Moreirense

- Taça da Liga: 2016–17
