= Pastor (footballer) =

Brazilian footballer (born 2000)

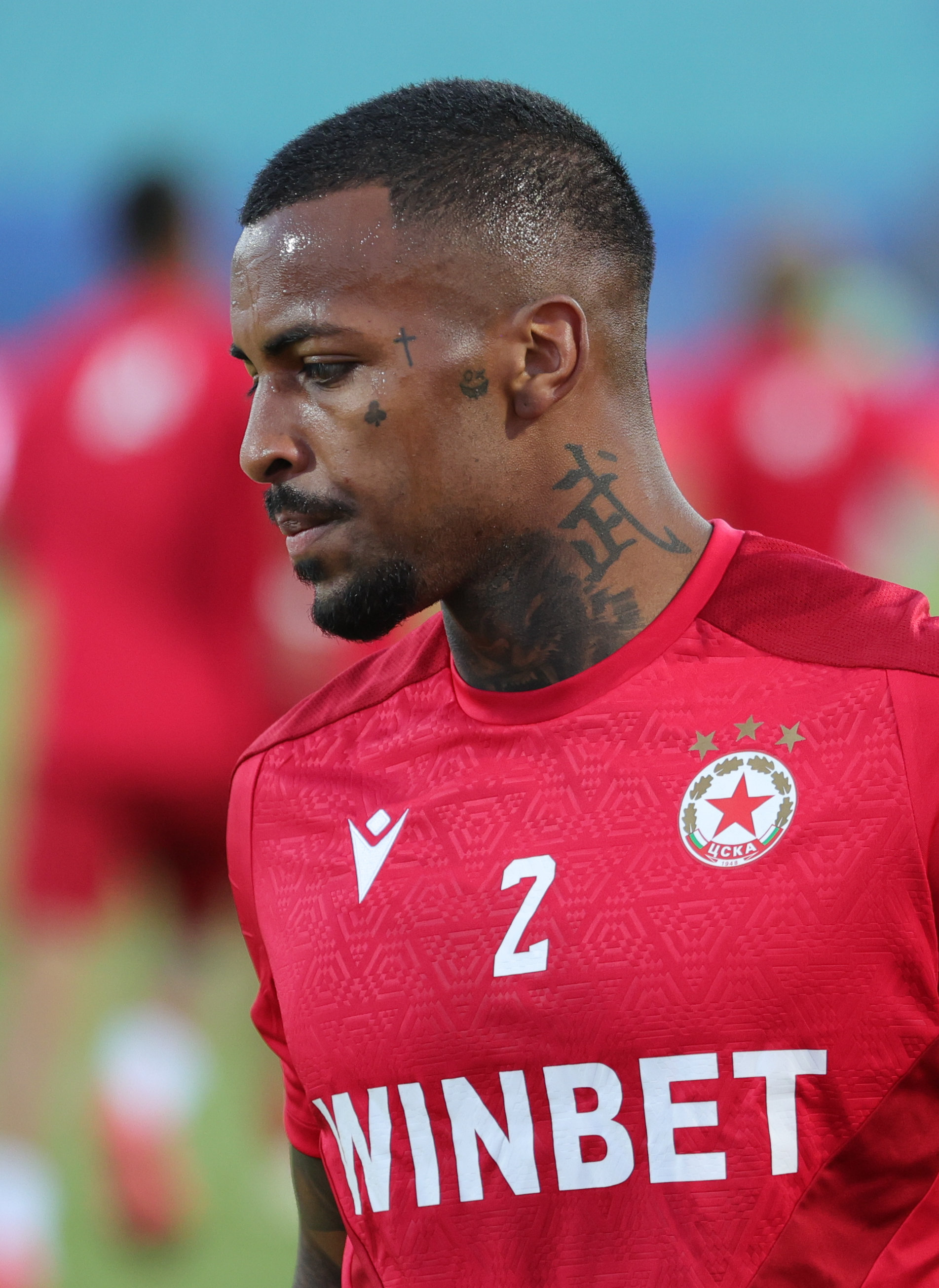

Personal information
- Full name: David Samuel Custódio Lima
- Date of birth: 20 February 2000 (age 26)
- Place of birth: Planaltina-DF, Brazil
- Height: 1.76 m (5 ft 9 in)
- Position: Right-back

Team information
- Current team: CSKA Sofia
- Number: 2

Youth career
- 2017–2019: Elosport
- 2019–2020: Londrina

Senior career*
Years	Team	Apps	(Gls)
2020	Londrina	7	(0)
2020–2024	Ferroviária	17	(0)
2021–2022	→ Leixões (loan)	20	(1)
2022–2023	→ Portimonense (loan)	1	(0)
2023–2024	→ Farense (loan)	44	(0)
2024–2025	Farense	31	(0)
2025–	CSKA Sofia	45	(0)
- * Club domestic league appearances and goals as of 17:09, 22 November 2026 (UTC)

David Samuel Custódio Lima (born 20 February 2000), known as Pastor, is a Brazilian professional footballer who plays as a right-back for Bulgarian First League club CSKA Sofia.

== Career ==
Pastor is a youth product of Elosport and Londrina, and began his senior career with them in the Campeonato Brasileiro Série C in January 2020. He moved to Ferroviária for the following season in the Campeonato Brasileiro Série D on 18 September 2020. On 1 July 2021, he joined Leixões on loan in the Liga Portugal 2. After 28 appearances with Leixões, he joined Portimonense on loan on 1 July 2022, in preparation for the 2022-23 season. On 22 July 2025 he signed for CSKA Sofia.

== Career statistics ==
As of 22 November 2026

Appearances and goals by club, season and competition
Club	Season	League			State league		National cup		League cup		Continental		Other		Total	
Club	Season	Division	Apps	Goals	Apps	Goals	Apps	Goals	Apps	Goals	Apps	Goals	Apps	Goals	Apps	Goals
Londrina	2020	Série C	4	0	3	0	0	0	–		–		–		7	0
Ferroviária	2020	Série D	9	0	0	0	0	0	–		–		–		9	0
Ferroviária	2021	Série D	1	0	7	0	0	0	–		–		0	0	8	0
Ferroviária	Total		10	0	7	0	0	0	0	0	0	0	0	0	17	0
Leixões (loan)	2021–22	Liga Portugal 2	20	1	–		2	0	0	0	–		–		22	1
Portimonense (loan)	2022–23	Primeira Liga	1	0	–		0	0	1	0	–		–		2	0
Farense (loan)	2022–23	Liga Portugal 2	14	0	–		0	0	0	0	–		–		14	0
Farense (loan)	2023–24	Primeira Liga	30	0	–		1	0	1	0	–		–		32	0
Farense	2024–25	Primeira Liga	31	0	–		3	0	0	0	–		–		34	0
Farense	Total		75	0	0	0	4	0	1	0	0	0	0	0	80	0
CSKA Sofia	2025–26	First League	32	0	–		5	0	–		–		–		37	0
CSKA Sofia	2026–27	First League	13	0	–		1	0	–		11	0	1	0	26	0
CSKA Sofia	Total		45	0	0	0	6	0	0	0	11	0	1	0	63	0
Career total			155	1	10	0	12	0	2	0	11	0	1	0	181	1

== Honours ==
CSKA Sofia

- Bulgarian Cup: 2025–26
- Bulgarian Supercup: 2026
