= Cristian Ponde =

Portuguese footballer (born 1995)

Personal information
- Full name: Cristian Ioan Ponde
- Date of birth: 26 January 1995 (age 31)
- Place of birth: Făurești, Romania
- Height: 1.79 m (5 ft 10 in)
- Position: Forward

Youth career
- 2002–2005: Olhanense
- 2005–2014: Sporting CP

Senior career*
| Years | Team | Apps | (Gls) |
| 2013–2018 | Sporting CP B | 88 | (14) |
| 2015 | Sporting CP | 0 | (0) |
| 2016–2017 | → Covilhã (loan) | 29 | (6) |
| 2018–2019 | Karpaty Lviv | 32 | (7) |
| 2020–2021 | Grasshoppers | 28 | (5) |
| 2021–2024 | Farense | 73 | (15) |
| 2024–2025 | Marítimo | 7 | (0) |
| 2025 | → Feirense (loan) | 12 | (2) |
| 2026 | Unirea Slobozia | 14 | (3) |

International career
| 2011–2012 | Portugal U17 | 9 | (1) |
| 2012–2013 | Portugal U18 | 10 | (2) |
| 2013–2014 | Portugal U19 | 10 | (8) |
- * Club domestic league appearances and goals as of 18 May 2026

Cristian Ioan Ponde (born 26 January 1995) is a professional footballer who plays as a forward.

== Club career ==
Born in Făurești, Maramureș County, Romania, Ponde emigrated to Portugal with his parents before his 10th birthday, and started playing football with S.C. Olhanense. In 2005, he joined Sporting CP to complete his development.

Ponde made his senior debut with the club's reserves on 24 February 2013, coming on as a substitute for fellow youth graduate Ricardo Esgaio for the final 14 minutes of a 5–1 home win against S.C. Freamunde in the Segunda Liga. He scored his first goal as a professional on 30 March of that year, but in a 1–3 home loss to S.L. Benfica B.

On 2 March 2014, during a second-tier game against S.C. Covilhã, Ponde contracted a serious injury to his right knee, going on to be sidelined for several months. His only competitive appearance for the first team took place on 21 January 2015, when he played three minutes in a 3–2 defeat at C.F. Os Belenenses in the group stage of the Taça da Liga.

For the 2016–17 season, Ponde was loaned to Covilhã. He then took his game to the Ukrainian Premier League, where he represented FC Karpaty Lviv after signing a three-year contract. He scored his first top-flight goal on 28 October 2018, contributing to the 5–0 away victory over FC Chornomorets Odesa.

Ponde joined Grasshopper Club Zurich on 25 August 2020, on a one-year deal. He returned to the Portuguese second division in summer 2021, agreeing to a one-year contract with the option of a further one at S.C. Farense. He scored six goals in the 2022–23 campaign, adding six assists in a return to the Primeira Liga after a two-year absence.

Ponde's first match in the top flight took place on 12 August 2023, replacing Elves Baldé at half-time of a 0–3 home loss against Casa Pia AC. He scored his first league goal the following 18 May, but in a 1–3 home defeat to Portimonense S.C. in the Algarve derby.

On 29 August 2024, Ponde signed with second-tier club C.S. Marítimo. In the following transfer window, he was loaned to C.D. Feirense of the same league until the end of the season; in July 2025, he left the former by mutual agreement.

Aged 31, Ponde returned to his birth nation halfway through the 2025–26 campaign, on a contract at Liga I side AFC Unirea Slobozia.

== International career ==
Ponde represented Portugal at under-17, under-18 and under-19 levels. He scored in his first appearance for the latter side, a 1–1 draw against Spain in a friendly tournament held in Hungary.

== Career statistics ==
As of 18 May 2026

Appearances and goals by club, season and competition
| Club | Season | League | | | National cup (Note: Includes Taça de Portugal, Ukrainian Cup, Swiss Cup) | | League cup (Note: Includes Taça da Liga) | | Europe | | Other | | Total | |
| Club | Season | Division | Apps | Goals | Apps | Goals | Apps | Goals | Apps | Goals | Apps | Goals | Apps | Goals |
|---|---|---|---|---|---|---|---|---|---|---|---|---|---|---|
| Sporting CP B | 2012–13 | Segunda Liga | 5 | 1 | — | | — | | — | | — | | 5 | 1 |
| Sporting CP B | 2013–14 | Segunda Liga | 21 | 1 | — | | — | | — | | — | | 21 | 1 |
| Sporting CP B | 2014–15 | Segunda Liga | 11 | 2 | — | | — | | — | | — | | 11 | 2 |
| Sporting CP B | 2015–16 | LigaPro | 33 | 6 | — | | — | | — | | — | | 33 | 6 |
| Sporting CP B | 2016–17 | LigaPro | 18 | 4 | — | | — | | — | | — | | 18 | 4 |
| Sporting CP B | Total | | 88 | 14 | 0 | 0 | 0 | 0 | 0 | 0 | 0 | 0 | 88 | 14 |
| Sporting CP | 2014–15 | Primeira Liga | 0 | 0 | 0 | 0 | 1 | 0 | 0 | 0 | — | | 1 | 0 |
| Covilhã (loan) | 2016–17 | LigaPro | 29 | 6 | 2 | 0 | 2 | 0 | — | | — | | 33 | 6 |
| Karpaty Lviv | 2018–19 | Ukrainian Premier League | 21 | 6 | 3 | 1 | — | | — | | 2 (Note: Appearances in Ukrainian Premier League relegation play-offs) | 1 | 26 | 8 |
| Karpaty Lviv | 2019–20 | Ukrainian Premier League | 11 | 1 | 1 | 0 | — | | — | | — | | 12 | 1 |
| Karpaty Lviv | Total | | 32 | 7 | 4 | 1 | 0 | 0 | 0 | 0 | 2 | 1 | 38 | 9 |
| Grasshoppers | 2020–21 | Swiss Challenge League | 28 | 5 | 2 | 1 | — | | — | | — | | 30 | 6 |
| Farense | 2021–22 | Liga Portugal 2 | 29 | 6 | 2 | 1 | 0 | 0 | — | | — | | 31 | 7 |
| Farense | 2022–23 | Liga Portugal 2 | 30 | 8 | 2 | 0 | 3 | 0 | — | | — | | 35 | 8 |
| Farense | 2023–24 | Primeira Liga | 14 | 1 | 1 | 0 | 3 | 0 | — | | — | | 18 | 1 |
| Farense | Total | | 73 | 15 | 5 | 1 | 6 | 0 | 0 | 0 | 0 | 0 | 84 | 16 |
| Marítimo | 2024–25 | Liga Portugal 2 | 7 | 0 | 1 | 0 | 0 | 0 | — | | — | | 8 | 0 |
| Feirense (loan) | 2024–25 | Liga Portugal 2 | 12 | 2 | — | | — | | — | | — | | 12 | 2 |
| Unirea Slobozia | 2025–26 | Liga I | 14 | 3 | — | | — | | — | | — | | 14 | 3 |
| Career total | | | 283 | 52 | 14 | 3 | 9 | 0 | 0 | 0 | 2 | 1 | 308 | 56 |

== Honours ==
Grasshoppers

- Swiss Challenge League: 2020–21
