= Claudio Falcão =

Brazilian footballer (born 1994)

Personal information
- Full name: Claudio Falcão Santos
- Date of birth: 3 July 1994 (age 32)
- Place of birth: Aquidauana, Brazil
- Height: 1.87 m (6 ft 2 in)
- Position: Midfielder

Team information
- Current team: Farense
- Number: 29

Youth career
- 2013–2014: Aquidauanense

Senior career*
Years	Team	Apps	(Gls)
2015–2016	Independente	21	(3)
2016–2020	Desportivo das Aves	49	(3)
2020–	Farense	162	(14)
- * Club domestic league appearances and goals as of 20 May 2026

Claudio Falcão Santos (born 3 July 1994) is a Brazilian professional footballer who plays as a midfielder for Liga Portugal 2 club Farense.

== Career ==
Falcão made his Primeira Liga debut for Desportivo das Aves on 6 August 2017 in a game against Sporting. He plays as defensive midfielder for Farense in the 2nd Portuguese League since 2020.

== Honours ==
Aves

- Taça de Portugal: 2017–18
