= Vítor Gonçalves (footballer, born 1992) =

Portuguese footballer

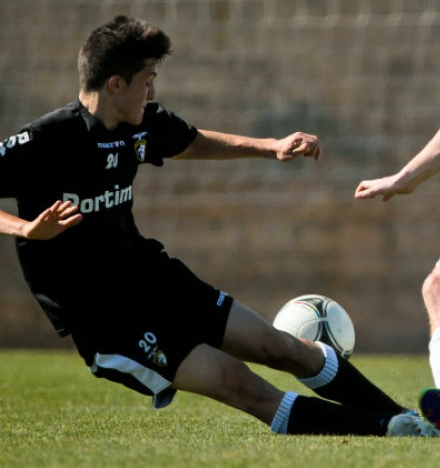
- Gonçalves with Portimonense in 2012

Personal information
- Full name: Vítor Bruno Rodrigues Gonçalves
- Date of birth: 29 March 1992 (age 34)
- Place of birth: São Bartolomeu, Portugal
- Height: 1.74 m (5 ft 9 in)
- Position: Midfielder

Team information
- Current team: Louletano

Youth career
- 2002–2004: Messinense
- 2004–2007: Benfica
- 2007–2011: Portimonense

Senior career*
| Years | Team | Apps | (Gls) |
| 2011–2013 | Portimonense | 52 | (1) |
| 2013–2016 | Gil Vicente | 73 | (4) |
| 2016–2020 | Nacional | 103 | (5) |
| 2020–2021 | Casa Pia | 28 | (0) |
| 2021–2022 | Nacional | 23 | (1) |
| 2022–2024 | Farense | 56 | (2) |
| 2024–2026 | Mafra | 45 | (3) |
| 2026– | Louletano | 3 | (0) |

International career
| 2012–2013 | Portugal U21 | 5 | (0) |
- * Club domestic league appearances and goals as of 15:26, 31 August 2026 (UTC)

Vítor Bruno Rodrigues Gonçalves (born 29 March 1992) is a Portuguese professional footballer who plays as a midfielder for Liga 3 club Louletano.

== Club career ==
Born in São Bartolomeu de Messines, Silves, Gonçalves spent several youth years at S.L. Benfica before returning to his native Algarve with Portimonense SC. He made his professional debut on 31 July 2011 in a Taça da Liga first round game at home to Moreirense FC, playing the full 90 minutes of a 3–1 win; on 27 August he made his Segunda Liga bow as a 77th-minute substitute for Sérgio Organista in a 2–1 victory against Associação Naval 1º de Maio also at the Estádio Municipal de Portimão. He played regularly in his two seasons as a senior at the club, and was sent off on 4 April 2012 in a 1–1 draw at C.D. Aves, moments before teammate Sérgio Semedo.

Gonçalves and Simeon Nwankwo signed with Gil Vicente F.C. in June 2013; the fee was set years later by a court at €176,525 as the two academy products were under 23. He made his Primeira Liga debut off the bench on 21 September in a 1–1 home draw with S.C. Olhanense, and scored his first career goal the following 1 February to earn the same result against visitors Benfica.

On 29 June 2016, after a year with Gil Vicente in the second division, Gonçalves returned to the top flight on a four-year contract at C.D. Nacional. After it expired – and with the team alternating divisions each year – he joined Casa Pia AC, before returning on a two-year deal in June 2021.

Gonçalves remained in the second tier in the 2022–23 campaign, agreeing to a one-year contract at S.C. Farense. In July 2024, the free agent signed with C.D. Mafra of the same league.

== International career ==
Gonçalves won the first of his five caps for Portugal at under-21 level on 15 October 2012, as a late substitute in a 1–0 loss against Ukraine in Moreira de Cónegos.
