= Fabrício Isidoro =

Brazilian footballer (born 1992)

Personal information
- Full name: Fabrício Isidoro Fonseca de Jesus
- Date of birth: 28 January 1992 (age 34)
- Place of birth: Belo Horizonte, Brazil
- Height: 1.72 m (5 ft 7 1/2 in)
- Position: Midfielder

Team information
- Current team: Athletic
- Number: 14

Youth career
- 2008–2011: Cruzeiro
- 2008: → Itaúna (loan)

Senior career*
| Years | Team | Apps | (Gls) |
| 2012 | Cruzeiro | 0 | (0) |
| 2012 | → Poços de Caldas (loan) | 2 | (0) |
| 2012–2013 | Democrata-SL | 3 | (0) |
| 2013 | → Sertãozinho (loan) | 18 | (1) |
| 2013 | Villa Nova | 1 | (0) |
| 2014 | Tupi | 3 | (0) |
| 2014–2015 | Caldas Novas | 23 | (1) |
| 2015–2016 | Formiga | 17 | (1) |
| 2016–2017 | Louletano | 31 | (7) |
| 2017–2024 | Farense | 184 | (14) |
| 2024–2025 | Al-Muharraq | | |
| 2025 | Leixões | 7 | (0) |
| 2025– | Athletic | 20 | (0) |
- * Club domestic league appearances and goals as of 18 December 2025

Fabrício Isidoro Fonseca de Jesus (born 28 January 1992) is a Brazilian football player who plays as a midfielder for Athletic.

== Club career ==
He made his professional debut in the Campeonato Mineiro for Tupi on 1 February 2014 in a game against Minas Boca.
