= Elves Baldé =

Bissau-Guinean footballer

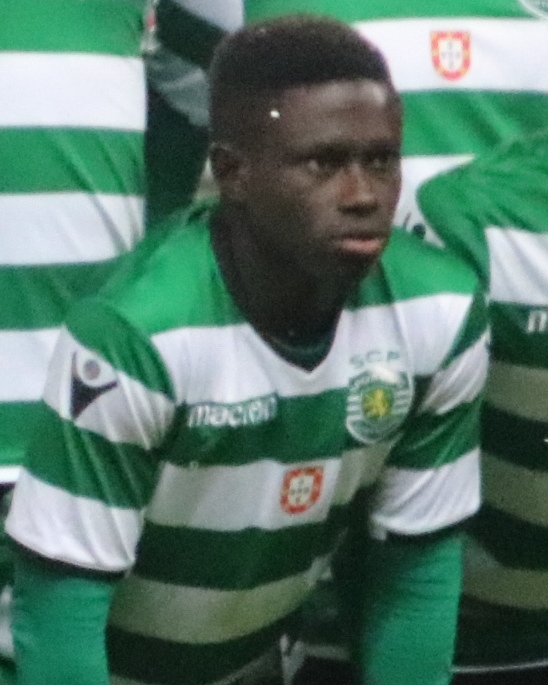
- Elves Baldé in February 2018

Personal information
- Full name: Elves Umar Baldé
- Date of birth: 2 October 1999 (age 27)
- Place of birth: Bissau, Guinea-Bissau
- Height: 1.68 m (5 ft 6 in)
- Position: Winger

Team information
- Current team: Radomiak Radom
- Number: 21

Youth career
- 2008–2009: Loures
- 2009–2017: Sporting CP

Senior career*
| Years | Team | Apps | (Gls) |
| 2016–2021 | Sporting B | 24 | (3) |
| 2019 | → Paços de Ferreira (loan) | 13 | (3) |
| 2019–2020 | → Feirense (loan) | 8 | (0) |
| 2021–2025 | Farense | 98 | (9) |
| 2025– | Radomiak Radom | 27 | (5) |

International career^{‡}
| 2014 | Portugal U15 | 2 | (0) |
| 2014–2015 | Portugal U16 | 7 | (1) |
| 2017 | Portugal U18 | 7 | (1) |
| 2017–2018 | Portugal U19 | 8 | (1) |
| 2018–2019 | Portugal U20 | 7 | (1) |
| 2024– | Guinea-Bissau | 2 | (0) |
Medal record
Men's football
Representing Portugal
UEFA European Under-19 Championship
| Winner | 2018 Finland |
- * Club domestic league appearances and goals as of 22:35, 29 May 2026 (UTC) ‡ National team caps and goals as of 17:04, 8 October 2025 (UTC)

Elves Umar Baldé (born 2 October 1999) is a Bissau-Guinean professional footballer who plays as a winger for Ekstraklasa club Radomiak Radom and the Guinea-Bissau national team.

== Club career ==
On 14 August 2016 Elves made his professional debut with Sporting B starting in a 2015–16 Segunda Liga match against Sporting da Covilhã.

On 27 December 2018 it was confirmed, that Baldé would spend the rest of the season on loan at Paços de Ferreira.

On 26 August 2019, he joined Feirense on loan.

== International career ==
Baldé made his debut for the Guinea-Bissau national team on 6 June 2024 in a World Cup qualifier against Ethiopia at the Estádio 24 de Setembro. He started the game and played 61 minutes as the game ended as a 0–0 draw.

== Career statistics ==
=== International ===
As of match played 8 October 2025

Appearances and goals by national team and year
| National team | Year | Apps | Goals |
|---|---|---|---|
Guinea-Bissau
| Guinea-Bissau | 2024 | 1 | 0 |
| Guinea-Bissau | 2025 | 1 | 0 |
| Total | | 2 | 0 |

== Honours ==
Portugal U19

- UEFA European Under-19 Championship: 2018

Individual

- Primeira Liga Goal of the Month: November 2024
- Primeira Liga Goal of the Season: 2024–25
