= Miguel Carvalho (footballer, born 1996) =

Portuguese footballer

Personal information
- Full name: Miguel Ângelo Loureiro de Carvalho
- Date of birth: 20 June 1996 (age 30)
- Place of birth: Faro, Portugal
- Height: 1.85 m (6 ft 1 in)
- Position: Goalkeeper

Team information
- Current team: Farense (assistant GK coach)

Youth career
- 2005–2008: Internacional Almancil
- 2008–2015: Farense

Senior career*
Years	Team	Apps	(Gls)
2015–2020	Farense	23	(0)
2020	Moura	3	(0)
2021	Condeixa	6	(0)
2021	Olhanense	4	(0)
2022–2026	Farense	3	(0)

Managerial career
- 2026–: Farense (assistant GK coach)
- * Club domestic league appearances and goals

Miguel Ângelo Loureiro de Carvalho (born 20 June 1996) is a Portuguese professional football coach and a former goalkeeper who works as an assistant goalkeeper coach for Liga Portugal 2 club Farense.

== Football career ==
On 21 July 2018, Carvalho made his professional debut with Farense in a 2018–19 Taça da Liga match against Penafiel.
