= 2017 UEFA European Under-19 Championship squads =

Player listings in youth football competition

The 2017 UEFA European Under-19 Championship was an international football tournament held in Georgia from 2 to 15 July 2017.

Each national team submitted a squad of 18 players, two of whom had to be goalkeepers.

Players in boldface have been capped at full international level since the tournament.

Ages are as of the start of the tournament, 2 July 2017.

== Group A ==
=== Georgia ===
Head coach: Georgi Kipiani

No.	Pos.	Player	Date of birth (age)	Caps	Goals	Club
1	GK	Giorgi Chochishvili	7 May 1998 (aged 19)			(Georgian Football Federation) Shevardeni-1906 Tbilisi
12	GK	Luka Gugeshashvili	29 April 1999 (aged 18)			(Polish Football Association) Jagiellonia Białystok
2	DF	**Nikoloz Mali**	27 January 1999 (aged 18)			(Georgian Football Federation) Saburtalo Tbilisi
3	DF	Shalva Burjanadze	29 October 1998 (aged 18)			(Georgian Football Federation) Torpedo Kutaisi
4	DF	Aleksandr Kakhidze	24 April 1999 (aged 18)			(Russian Football Union) Spartak Moscow
5	DF	Davit Kobouri (captain)	24 January 1998 (aged 19)			(Georgian Football Federation) Dinamo Tbilisi
13	DF	Toma Khubashvili	29 July 1998 (aged 18)			(Georgian Football Federation) Saburtalo Tbilisi
21	DF	Luka Lakvekheliani	22 October 1998 (aged 18)			(Georgian Football Federation) Saburtalo Tbilisi
6	MF	Giorgi Kutsia	27 October 1999 (aged 17)			(Georgian Football Federation) Dinamo Tbilisi
7	MF	Giorgi Kokhreidze	18 November 1998 (aged 18)			(Georgian Football Federation) Saburtalo Tbilisi
8	MF	Davit Samurkasovi	5 February 1998 (aged 19)			(Georgian Football Federation) Locomotive Tbilisi
9	MF	**Vato Arveladze**	3 April 1998 (aged 19)			(Georgian Football Federation) Locomotive Tbilisi
10	MF	**Giorgi Chakvetadze**	29 August 1999 (aged 17)			(Georgian Football Federation) Dinamo Tbilisi
14	MF	Giorgi Kochorashvili	29 June 1999 (aged 18)			(Georgian Football Federation) Saburtalo Tbilisi
11	FW	Gabrieli Sagrishvili	17 June 1998 (aged 19)			(Georgian Football Federation) Torpedo Kutaisi
17	FW	Nika Kvantaliani	6 February 1998 (aged 19)			(Georgian Football Federation) Dinamo Batumi
18	FW	Temur Chogadze	5 May 1998 (aged 19)			(Georgian Football Federation) Saburtalo Tbilisi
20	FW	**Giorgi Arabidze**	4 March 1998 (aged 19)			(Ukrainian Association of Football) Shakhtar Donetsk

=== Czech Republic ===
Head coach: Jan Suchopárek

No.	Pos.	Player	Date of birth (age)	Caps	Goals	Club
1	GK	Jan Plachý	5 July 1998 (aged 18)	10	0	(Football Association of the Czech Republic) FK Teplice
16	GK	**Martin Jedlička**	24 January 1998 (aged 19)	10	0	(Football Association of the Czech Republic) 1. FK Příbram
3	DF	**Matěj Chaluš**	2 February 1998 (aged 19)	10	0	(Football Association of the Czech Republic) 1. FK Příbram
4	DF	Libor Holík	12 May 1998 (aged 19)	10	0	(Football Association of the Czech Republic) Slavia Prague
18	DF	Denis Granečný	7 September 1998 (aged 18)	12	0	(Football Association of the Czech Republic) Baník Ostrava
21	DF	František Čech	6 December 1998 (aged 18)	3	0	(Football Association of the Czech Republic) Hradec Králové
5	MF	Daniel Mareček	30 May 1998 (aged 19)	10	1	(Football Association of the Czech Republic) Sparta Prague
6	MF	Emil Tischler	13 March 1998 (aged 19)	6	1	(Football Association of the Czech Republic) 1. FC Slovácko
8	MF	**Michal Sadílek**	31 May 1999 (aged 18)	10	2	(Royal Dutch Football Association) PSV Eindhoven
13	MF	**Alex Král**	19 May 1998 (aged 19)	12	1	(Football Association of the Czech Republic) Slavia Prague
14	MF	Filip Havelka	21 January 1998 (aged 19)	9	1	(Football Association of the Czech Republic) Sparta Prague
15	MF	Ondřej Chvěja	17 July 1998 (aged 18)	8	2	(Football Association of the Czech Republic) Baník Ostrava
20	MF	Michal Hlavatý	17 June 1998 (aged 19)	4	0	(Football Association of the Czech Republic) Baník Sokolov
7	FW	Daniel Turyna	26 February 1998 (aged 19)	9	4	(Football Association of the Czech Republic) Sparta Prague
9	FW	**Ondřej Lingr**	10 July 1998 (aged 18)	11	1	(Football Association of the Czech Republic) Karviná
10	FW	Ondřej Šašinka (captain)	21 March 1998 (aged 19)	14	5	(Football Association of the Czech Republic) Baník Ostrava
12	FW	Ondřej Novotný	2 May 1998 (aged 19)	6	1	(Football Association of the Czech Republic) Sparta Prague
19	FW	Martin Graiciar	4 November 1999 (aged 17)	3	1	(Football Association of the Czech Republic) Slovan Liberec

=== Sweden ===
On 16 June 2017, Sweden named their squad. On 28 June, defender Dennis Hadžikadunić and midfielders Mattias Svanberg and Svante Ingelsson left the squad, being replaced by Anel Ahmedhodžić, Teddy Bergqvist and Joseph Ceesay.

Head coach: Claes Eriksson

No.	Pos.	Player	Date of birth (age)	Caps	Goals	Club
1	GK	Marko Johansson	25 August 1998 (aged 18)	8	0	(Swedish Football Association) Trelleborgs FF
12	GK	**Viktor Johansson**	14 September 1998 (aged 18)	5	0	(The Football Association) Aston Villa
2	DF	Mattias Andersson	13 March 1998 (aged 19)	12	1	(Italian Football Federation) Juventus
3	DF	Charlie Weberg	22 May 1998 (aged 19)	0	0	(Swedish Football Association) Helsingborgs IF
4	DF	Joseph Colley	13 April 1999 (aged 18)	5	0	(The Football Association) Chelsea
5	DF	**Anel Ahmedhodžić** (Note: Capped at senior level for Sweden, then capped for Bosnia and Herzegovina)	26 March 1999 (aged 18)	4	3	(The Football Association) Nottingham Forest
6	DF	Anton Kralj	12 March 1998 (aged 19)	12	0	(Swedish Football Association) Malmö FF
7	DF	Thomas Isherwood	28 January 1998 (aged 19)	13	2	(German Football Association) Bayern Munich
9	MF	Max Svensson	19 June 1998 (aged 19)	2	0	(Swedish Football Association) Helsingborgs IF
10	MF	Carl Johansson	17 June 1998 (aged 19)	6	1	(Swedish Football Association) Kalmar FF
13	MF	**Joseph Ceesay** (Note: Capped for Gambia)	3 June 1998 (aged 19)	2	0	(Swedish Football Association) Vasalunds IF
14	MF	Dušan Jajić (captain)	4 July 1998 (aged 18)	15	2	(Swedish Football Association) Hammarby IF
15	MF	Besard Sabović	5 January 1998 (aged 19)	13	0	(Swedish Football Association) IF Brommapojkarna
16	MF	Samuel Adrian	2 March 1998 (aged 19)	1	0	(Swedish Football Association) Malmö FF
8	FW	Teddy Bergqvist	16 March 1999 (aged 18)	5	1	(Swedish Football Association) Malmö FF
11	FW	**Jesper Karlsson**	25 July 1998 (aged 18)	10	2	(Swedish Football Association) IF Elfsborg
17	FW	**Viktor Gyökeres**	4 June 1998 (aged 19)	13	4	(Swedish Football Association) IF Brommapojkarna
18	FW	**Isac Lidberg**	8 September 1998 (aged 18)	14	10	(Swedish Football Association) Åtvidabergs FF

=== Portugal ===
On 25 June 2017, Portugal announced their final squad. On 28 June, Madi Queta replaced injured José Gomes.

Head coach: Hélio Sousa

No.	Pos.	Player	Date of birth (age)	Caps	Goals	Club
1	GK	**Diogo Costa**	19 September 1999 (aged 17)	9		(Portuguese Football Federation) Porto
12	GK	Daniel Figueira	20 July 1998 (aged 18)	1		(Portuguese Football Federation) Vitória de Guimarães
2	DF	**Diogo Dalot**	18 March 1999 (aged 18)	10		(Portuguese Football Federation) Porto
3	DF	Diogo Queirós	5 January 1999 (aged 18)	8		(Portuguese Football Federation) Porto
4	DF	Diogo Leite	23 January 1999 (aged 18)	1		(Portuguese Football Federation) Porto
5	DF	Abdu Conté	24 March 1998 (aged 19)	6		(Portuguese Football Federation) Sporting CP
15	DF	João Queirós	22 April 1998 (aged 19)	8		(Portuguese Football Federation) Porto
6	MF	Rui Pires	23 March 1998 (aged 19)	5		(Portuguese Football Federation) Porto
8	MF	**Gedson Fernandes**	9 January 1999 (aged 18)	5		(Portuguese Football Federation) Benfica
10	MF	**Bruno Paz** (Note: Capped for Angola)	23 April 1998 (aged 19)	6		(Portuguese Football Federation) Sporting CP
14	MF	Florentino Luís	19 August 1999 (aged 17)	7		(Portuguese Football Federation) Benfica
16	MF	Miguel Luís	27 February 1999 (aged 18)	9		(Portuguese Football Federation) Sporting CP
18	MF	Domingos Quina	18 November 1999 (aged 17)	5		(The Football Association) West Ham United
7	FW	João Filipe	29 March 1999 (aged 18)	3		(Portuguese Football Federation) Benfica
9	FW	**Madi Queta** (Note: Capped for Guinea-Bissau)	21 October 1998 (aged 18)	6		(Portuguese Football Federation) Porto
11	FW	Mesaque Djú	18 March 1999 (aged 18)	5		(Portuguese Football Federation) Benfica
13	FW	Rui Pedro	20 March 1998 (aged 19)	7		(Portuguese Football Federation) Porto
17	FW	**Rafael Leão**	10 June 1999 (aged 18)	9		(Portuguese Football Federation) Sporting CP

== Group B ==
=== Germany ===
On 25 June 2017, Germany announced their final squad. Maxime Awoudja later replaced Salih Özcan due to illness.

Head coach: Frank Kramer

No.	Pos.	Player	Date of birth (age)	Caps	Goals	Club
1	GK	Eike Bansen	21 February 1998 (aged 19)	0	0	(German Football Association) Borussia Dortmund
12	GK	Markus Schubert	12 June 1998 (aged 19)	7	0	(German Football Association) Dynamo Dresden
2	DF	Jonas Busam	3 May 1998 (aged 19)	6	2	(German Football Association) SC Freiburg
3	DF	Dominik Franke	5 October 1998 (aged 18)	8	0	(German Football Association) RB Leipzig
5	DF	Jeff Chabot	12 February 1998 (aged 19)	4	1	(Royal Dutch Football Association) Sparta Rotterdam
19	DF	Maxime Awoudja	2 February 1998 (aged 19)	0	0	(German Football Association) Bayern Munich
4	MF	Gökhan Gül	17 July 1998 (aged 18)	12	2	(German Football Association) Fortuna Düsseldorf
6	MF	Dennis Geiger	10 June 1998 (aged 19)	9	0	(German Football Association) TSG Hoffenheim
7	MF	**Aymen Barkok** (Note: Capped for Morocco)	21 May 1998 (aged 19)	3	1	(German Football Association) Eintracht Frankfurt
8	MF	Sidney Friede	12 April 1998 (aged 19)	4	0	(German Football Association) Hertha BSC
9	MF	**Etienne Amenyido** (Note: Capped for Togo)	1 March 1998 (aged 19)	4	4	(German Football Association) Borussia Dortmund
11	MF	Robin Hack	27 August 1998 (aged 18)	6	1	(German Football Association) TSG Hoffenheim
13	MF	**David Raum**	22 April 1998 (aged 19)	2	1	(German Football Association) Greuther Fürth
14	MF	Felix Götze	11 February 1998 (aged 19)	0	0	(German Football Association) Bayern Munich
15	MF	Görkem Sağlam	11 April 1998 (aged 19)	0	0	(German Football Association) VfL Bochum
16	MF	**Bote Baku**	8 April 1998 (aged 19)	8	3	(German Football Association) Mainz 05
17	FW	Mats Köhlert	2 May 1998 (aged 19)	6	2	(German Football Association) Hamburger SV
18	FW	Tobias Warschewski	6 February 1998 (aged 19)	2	1	(German Football Association) Preußen Münster

=== England ===
Head coach: Keith Downing

No.	Pos.	Player	Date of birth (age)	Club
1	GK	**Aaron Ramsdale**	14 May 1998 (aged 19)	(The Football Association) Bournemouth
13	GK	Nathan Trott	21 November 1998 (aged 18)	(The Football Association) West Ham United
2	DF	Dujon Sterling	24 October 1999 (aged 17)	(The Football Association) Chelsea
3	DF	**Jay Dasilva** (Note: Capped for Wales)	22 April 1998 (aged 19)	(The Football Association) Chelsea
4	DF	Tayo Edun	14 May 1998 (aged 19)	(The Football Association) Fulham
5	DF	**Trevoh Chalobah**	5 July 1999 (aged 17)	(The Football Association) Chelsea
6	DF	**Easah Suliman** (Note: Capped for Pakistan)	26 January 1998 (aged 19)	(The Football Association) Aston Villa
11	DF	Ryan Sessegnon	18 May 2000 (aged 17)	(The Football Association) Fulham
16	DF	Darnell Johnson	3 September 1998 (aged 18)	(The Football Association) Leicester City
18	DF	**Reece James**	8 December 1999 (aged 17)	(The Football Association) Chelsea
8	MF	Andre Dozzell	2 May 1999 (aged 18)	(The Football Association) Ipswich Town
10	MF	**Mason Mount**	10 January 1999 (aged 18)	(The Football Association) Chelsea
14	MF	Marcus Edwards	3 December 1998 (aged 18)	(The Football Association) Tottenham Hotspur
17	MF	Jacob Maddox	3 November 1998 (aged 18)	(The Football Association) Chelsea
7	FW	Isaac Buckley-Ricketts	1 January 1998 (aged 19)	(The Football Association) Manchester City
9	FW	**Ben Brereton** (Note: Capped for Chile)	18 April 1999 (aged 18)	(The Football Association) Nottingham Forest
12	FW	**Lukas Nmecha** (Note: Capped for Germany)	12 December 1998 (aged 18)	(The Football Association) Manchester City
15	FW	Josh Dasilva	23 October 1998 (aged 18)	(The Football Association) Arsenal

=== Bulgaria ===
On 21 June 2017, Bulgaria announced their final squad.

Head coach: Angel Stoykov

No.	Pos.	Player	Date of birth (age)	Caps	Goals	Club
1	GK	**Daniel Naumov**	29 March 1998 (aged 19)	13	0	(Bulgarian Football Union) Ludogorets
12	GK	Dimitar Sheytanov	15 September 1999 (aged 17)	1	0	(Bulgarian Football Union) Levski Sofia
2	DF	**Andrea Hristov**	1 March 1999 (aged 18)	7	0	(Bulgarian Football Union) Slavia Sofia
3	DF	Vasil Dobrev	5 January 1998 (aged 19)	12	0	(Bulgarian Football Union) Septemvri Sofia
4	DF	**Angel Lyaskov**	18 March 1998 (aged 19)	18	0	(Bulgarian Football Union) CSKA Sofia
5	DF	Petar Genchev	29 August 1998 (aged 18)	14	1	(Bulgarian Football Union) Septemvri Sofia
15	DF	**Petko Hristov**	1 March 1999 (aged 18)	12	0	(Bulgarian Football Union) Slavia Sofia
18	DF	Mariyan Dimitrov	28 September 1998 (aged 18)	11	1	(Bulgarian Football Union) Septemvri Sofia
6	MF	Ivaylo Klimentov	3 February 1998 (aged 19)	10	0	(Bulgarian Football Union) Ludogorets
7	MF	Ivaylo Naydenov	22 March 1998 (aged 19)	14	0	(Bulgarian Football Union) Levski Sofia
8	MF	Georgi Yanev	4 January 1998 (aged 19)	8	0	(Bulgarian Football Union) Levski Sofia
10	MF	**Georgi Rusev**	2 July 1998 (aged 19)	14	2	(Royal Spanish Football Federation) Elche
11	MF	**Svetoslav Kovachev**	14 March 1998 (aged 19)	14	0	(Bulgarian Football Union) Ludogorets
20	MF	Mateo Stamatov	22 March 1999 (aged 18)	3	1	(Royal Spanish Football Federation) Espanyol
22	MF	Ivan Tilev	5 January 1999 (aged 18)	9	1	(Bulgarian Football Union) Septemvri Sofia
9	FW	**Tonislav Yordanov**	27 November 1998 (aged 18)	21	6	(Bulgarian Football Union) CSKA Sofia
16	FW	**Kaloyan Krastev**	24 January 1999 (aged 18)	8	6	(Bulgarian Football Union) Slavia Sofia
19	FW	Stanislav Ivanov	16 April 1999 (aged 18)	11	2	(Bulgarian Football Union) Levski Sofia

=== Netherlands ===
On 22 June 2017, the Netherlands named their squad.

Head coach: Maarten Stekelenburg

No.	Pos.	Player	Date of birth (age)	Caps	Goals	Club
1	GK	**Justin Bijlow**	22 January 1998 (aged 19)	9	0	(Royal Dutch Football Association) Feyenoord
16	GK	**Maarten Paes** (Note: Capped for Indonesia)	14 May 1998 (aged 19)	2	0	(Royal Dutch Football Association) NEC
2	DF	Tristan Dekker	27 March 1998 (aged 19)	0	0	(Royal Dutch Football Association) VVV-Venlo
3	DF	Robin Zwartjens	17 March 1998 (aged 19)	0	0	(Royal Dutch Football Association) Feyenoord
4	DF	**Armando Obispo** (Note: Capped for Curaçao)	5 March 1999 (aged 18)	0	0	(Royal Dutch Football Association) PSV Eindhoven
5	DF	**Jurich Carolina**	15 July 1998 (aged 18)	12	0	(Royal Dutch Football Association) PSV Eindhoven
13	DF	**Navajo Bakboord** (Note: Capped for Suriname)	29 January 1999 (aged 18)	0	0	(Royal Dutch Football Association) Ajax
15	DF	Boy Kemper	21 June 1999 (aged 18)	0	0	(Royal Dutch Football Association) Ajax
6	MF	Dani de Wit	12 May 1998 (aged 19)	11	1	(Royal Dutch Football Association) Ajax
8	MF	**Teun Koopmeiners**	28 February 1998 (aged 19)	9	0	(Royal Dutch Football Association) AZ
10	MF	**Ferdi Kadioglu** (Note: Capped for Turkey)	7 October 1999 (aged 17)	3	2	(Royal Dutch Football Association) NEC
11	MF	**Javairô Dilrosun**	22 June 1998 (aged 19)	11	2	(The Football Association) Manchester City
12	MF	Rodney Kongolo	9 January 1998 (aged 19)	7	0	(The Football Association) Manchester City
14	MF	**Justin Lonwijk**	21 December 1999 (aged 17)	0	0	(Royal Dutch Football Association) PSV Eindhoven
18	MF	**Noa Lang**	17 June 1999 (aged 18)	0	0	(Royal Dutch Football Association) Ajax
7	FW	**Jay-Roy Grot**	13 March 1998 (aged 19)	2	0	(Royal Dutch Football Association) NEC
9	FW	**Joël Piroe**	2 August 1999 (aged 17)	2	0	(Royal Dutch Football Association) PSV Eindhoven
17	FW	Ché Nunnely	4 February 1999 (aged 18)	0	0	(Royal Dutch Football Association) Ajax
