= 2017 UEFA European Under-19 Championship qualification =

Tournament details
- Dates: Qualifying round: 4 October – 15 November 2016; Elite round: 22–28 March 2017
- Teams: 53 (from 1 confederation)

Tournament statistics
- Matches played: 120
- Goals scored: 359 (2.99 per match)
- Top scorer(s): (Finland) Lassi Lappalainen (Norway) Birk Risa (Wales) Nathan Broadhead (5 goals each)

The 2017 UEFA European Under-19 Championship qualifying competition was a men's under-19 football competition that determined the seven teams joining the automatically qualified hosts Georgia in the 2017 UEFA European Under-19 Championship final tournament.

A total of 53 UEFA member national teams entered the qualifying competition. Players born on or after 1 January 1998 are eligible to participate.

== Format ==
The qualifying competition consists of two rounds:

- Qualifying round: Apart from Spain, which receive a bye to the elite round as the team with the highest seeding coefficient, the remaining 52 teams are drawn into 13 groups of four teams. Each group is played in single round-robin format at one of the teams selected as hosts after the draw. The 13 group winners, the 13 runners-up, and the third-placed team with the best record against the first and second-placed teams in their group advance to the elite round.
- Elite round: The 28 teams are drawn into seven groups of four teams. Each group is played in single round-robin format at one of the teams selected as hosts after the draw. The seven group winners qualify for the final tournament.

=== Tiebreakers ===
The teams are ranked according to points (3 points for a win, 1 point for a draw, 0 points for a loss). If two or more teams are equal on points on completion of a mini-tournament, the following tie-breaking criteria are applied, in the order given, to determine the rankings (Regulations Articles 14.01 and 14.02):

1. Higher number of points obtained in the mini-tournament matches played among the teams in question;
2. Superior goal difference resulting from the mini-tournament matches played among the teams in question;
3. Higher number of goals scored in the mini-tournament matches played among the teams in question;
4. If, after having applied criteria 1 to 3, teams still have an equal ranking, criteria 1 to 3 are reapplied exclusively to the mini-tournament matches between the teams in question to determine their final rankings. If this procedure does not lead to a decision, criteria 5 to 9 apply;
5. Superior goal difference in all mini-tournament matches;
6. Higher number of goals scored in all mini-tournament matches;
7. If only two teams have the same number of points, and they are tied according to criteria 1 to 6 after having met in the last round of the mini-tournament, their rankings are determined by a penalty shoot-out (not used if more than two teams have the same number of points, or if their rankings are not relevant for qualification for the next stage).
8. Lower disciplinary points total based only on yellow and red cards received in the mini-tournament matches (red card = 3 points, yellow card = 1 point, expulsion for two yellow cards in one match = 3 points);
9. Higher position in the coefficient ranking list used for the qualifying round draw;
10. Drawing of lots.

To determine the best third-placed team from the qualifying round, the results against the teams in fourth place are discarded. The following criteria are applied (Regulations Article 15.01):

1. Higher number of points;
2. Superior goal difference;
3. Higher number of goals scored;
4. Lower disciplinary points total based only on yellow and red cards received (red card = 3 points, yellow card = 1 point, expulsion for two yellow cards in one match = 3 points);
5. Higher position in the coefficient ranking list used for the qualifying round draw;
6. Drawing of lots.

== Qualifying round ==
=== Draw ===
The draw for the qualifying round was held on 3 December 2015, 10:00 CET (UTC+1), at the UEFA headquarters in Nyon, Switzerland.

The teams were seeded according to their coefficient ranking, calculated based on the following:

- 2013 UEFA European Under-19 Championship final tournament and qualifying competition (qualifying round and elite round)
- 2014 UEFA European Under-19 Championship final tournament and qualifying competition (qualifying round and elite round)
- 2015 UEFA European Under-19 Championship final tournament and qualifying competition (qualifying round and elite round)

Each group contained two teams from Pot A and two teams from Pot B. For political reasons, Armenia and Azerbaijan (due to the disputed status of Nagorno-Karabakh), as well as Russia and Ukraine (due to the Russian military intervention in Ukraine), could not be drawn in the same group.

Final tournament hosts: Team / Coeff / Rank; **Georgia** / 7.833 / —	Bye to elite round: Team / Coeff / Rank; Spain / 13.667 / 1

Teams entering qualifying round

Pot A
Team	Coeff	Rank
**Portugal**	11.167	2
Serbia	10.667	3
Austria	9.833	4
**Germany**	9.500	5
Russia	9.000	6
Turkey	9.000	7
Ukraine	8.833	8
France	8.833	9
**Netherlands**	8.500	10
**England**	8.167	11
Denmark	7.000	12
Greece	6.667	13
**Czech Republic**	6.667	14
Belgium	6.333	15
Republic of Ireland	6.167	16
Norway	6.000	17
**Sweden**	6.000	18
Italy	5.833	19
Croatia	5.833	20
Slovakia	5.667	21
Scotland	5.500	22
Switzerland	5.500	23
Israel	5.500	24
Montenegro	5.333	25
Macedonia	4.333	26
Bosnia and Herzegovina	4.167	27

Pot B
Team	Coeff	Rank
**Bulgaria**	4.167	28
Poland	3.833	29
Cyprus	3.833	30
Wales	3.833	31
Hungary	3.667	32
Lithuania	3.333	33
Romania	3.167	34
Estonia	2.667	35
Northern Ireland	2.667	36
Iceland	2.500	37
Latvia	2.333	38
Armenia	2.333	39
Malta	2.333	40
Slovenia	2.333	41
Finland	2.000	42
Azerbaijan	1.833	43
Belarus	1.667	44
Albania	1.667	45
Moldova	1.333	46
Luxembourg	1.333	47
Kazakhstan	0.333	48
Andorra	0.000	49
San Marino	0.000	50
Faroe Islands	0.000	51
Gibraltar	0.000	52
Liechtenstein	0.000	53

Notes

- Teams marked in **bold** have qualified for the final tournament.

=== Groups ===
The qualifying round must be played on the following FIFA International Match Calendar dates unless all four teams agree to play on another date:

- 29 August – 6 September 2016
- 3–11 October 2016
- 7–15 November 2016

Times up to 29 October 2016 are CEST (UTC+2), thereafter times are CET (UTC+1).

==== Group 1 ====
Pos	Team	Pld	W	D	L	GF	GA	GD	Pts	Qualification
1	Belgium (H)	3	1	2	0	9	4	+5	**5**	Elite round
2	Finland	3	1	2	0	9	3	+6	**5**	Elite round
3	Russia	3	1	2	0	8	3	+5	**5**	
4	Kazakhstan	3	0	0	3	0	16	−16	**0**	

Source: UEFA
Rules for classification: Qualification tiebreakers
(H) Hosts
6 October 2016
15:00

Russia	1–1	Finland
Makhatadze 88'	Report	Lappalainen 58'

Gemeentelijk Sportpark, Tessenderlo
Attendance: 100
Referee: Sebastian Colțescu (Romania)
6 October 2016
19:30

Kazakhstan	0–5	Belgium
	Report	Verreth 4', 14'; Vancamp 8'; Vanzeir 55'; Daneels 77'

Gemeentelijk Sportstadion, Maasmechelen
Attendance: 600
Referee: Enea Jorgji (Albania)

8 October 2016
15:00

Belgium	2–2	Finland
Vancamp 33'; Faes 90+3'	Report	Soisalo 29'; Lappalainen 72'

Gemeentelijk Sportpark, Tessenderlo
Attendance: 1,010
Referee: Enea Jorgji (Albania)
8 October 2016
19:30

Russia	5–0	Kazakhstan
Lysov 14'; Galanin 21'; Chalov 44'; Prudnikov 88'; Lomovitskiy 90+2'	Report

Mijnstadion, Beringen
Attendance: 80
Referee: Þorvaldur Árnason (Iceland)

11 October 2016
19:00

Belgium	2–2	Russia
Mangala 19'; Verreth 90+3'	Report	Lomovitskiy 33'; Makhatadze 50' (pen.)

Mijnstadion, Beringen
Attendance: 1,500
Referee: Sebastian Colțescu (Romania)
11 October 2016
19:00

Finland	6–0	Kazakhstan
Ylätupa 16', 44'; Soisalo 25'; Eremenko 45+2', 65'; Lappalainen 46'	Report

Gemeentelijk Sportstadion, Maasmechelen
Attendance: 40
Referee: Þorvaldur Árnason (Iceland)

==== Group 2 ====
Pos	Team	Pld	W	D	L	GF	GA	GD	Pts	Qualification
1	Netherlands (H)	3	3	0	0	7	1	+6	**9**	Elite round
2	Norway	3	2	0	1	12	2	+10	**6**	Elite round
3	Romania	3	1	0	2	8	5	+3	**3**	
4	San Marino	3	0	0	3	0	19	−19	**0**	

Source: UEFA
Rules for classification: Qualification tiebreakers
(H) Hosts
6 October 2016
17:00

San Marino	0–9	Norway
	Report	Ajer 14' (pen.); Risa 19', 32', 48', 56', 76'; Hansson 38'; Agouda 62'; Giorgini 83' (o.g.)

Sportpark Het Midden, Vriezenveen
Attendance: 150
Referee: Ádám Farkas (Hungary)
6 October 2016
19:30

Netherlands	2–1	Romania
Bijleveld 45'; Dilrosun 45+1'	Report	Petre 13'

Sportpark De Boshoek, Hardenberg
Attendance: 350
Referee: Steven McLean (Scotland)

8 October 2016
15:00

Norway	3–1	Romania
Roseth 14'; Ajer 86'; Grødem 90'	Report	Man 68'

Sportpark De Boshoek, Hardenberg
Attendance: 150
Referee: Ádám Farkas (Hungary)
8 October 2016
18:00

Netherlands	4–0	San Marino
Velanas 3'; Sierhuis 64', 67', 78' (pen.)	Report

Sportpark Het Midden, Vriezenveen
Attendance: 650
Referee: Vitali Meshkov (Russia)

11 October 2016
19:30

Norway	0–1	Netherlands
	Report	Dilrosun 5'

Sportpark De Boshoek, Hardenberg
Attendance: 900
Referee: Steven McLean (Scotland)
11 October 2016
19:30

Romania	6–0	San Marino
Coman 23', 51'; Hagi 26', 56', 81'; Petre 37'	Report

Sportpark Het Midden, Vriezenveen
Attendance: 80
Referee: Vitali Meshkov (Russia)

==== Group 3 ====
Pos	Team	Pld	W	D	L	GF	GA	GD	Pts	Qualification
1	Israel	3	3	0	0	9	2	+7	**9**	Elite round
2	Scotland	3	2	0	1	2	1	+1	**6**	Elite round
3	Andorra (H)	3	1	0	2	6	6	0	**3**	
4	Liechtenstein	3	0	0	3	2	10	−8	**0**	

Source: UEFA
Rules for classification: Qualification tiebreakers
(H) Hosts
25 October 2016
11:30

Liechtenstein	0–1	Scotland
	Report	Shaw 10'

Centre d'Entrenament FAF, Andorra la Vella
Attendance: 50
Referee: Pavel Orel (Czech Republic)
25 October 2016
16:00

Israel	3–2	Andorra
Khalaila 18'; Asefa 21'; Mahamid 86' (pen.)	Report	Martínez 56'; Pomares 73'

Estadi Comunal, Andorra la Vella
Attendance: 200
Referee: Ali Palabıyık (Turkey)

27 October 2016
11:30

Israel	5–0	Liechtenstein
Mahamid 15', 43'; Altman 28'; Khalaila 60'; Najjar 73'	Report

Centre d'Entrenament FAF, Andorra la Vella
Attendance: 30
Referee: Juri Frischer (Estonia)
27 October 2016
16:00

Scotland	1–0	Andorra
Hornby 40' (pen.)	Report

Estadi Comunal, Andorra la Vella
Attendance: 280
Referee: Pavel Orel (Czech Republic)

30 October 2016
12:00

Scotland	0–1	Israel
	Report	Abu Fani 14'

Centre d'Entrenament FAF, Andorra la Vella
Attendance: 60
Referee: Ali Palabıyık (Turkey)
30 October 2016
12:00

Andorra	4–2	Liechtenstein
Fernández 27'; Torres 30'; Quaderer 38' (o.g.); Martínez 87'	Report	Marxer 77'; Frick 90'

Estadi Comunal, Andorra la Vella
Attendance: 350
Referee: Juri Frischer (Estonia)

==== Group 4 ====
Pos	Team	Pld	W	D	L	GF	GA	GD	Pts	Qualification
1	Germany	3	3	0	0	12	2	+10	**9**	Elite round
2	Republic of Ireland	3	2	0	1	6	4	+2	**6**	Elite round
3	Albania (H)	3	1	0	2	3	4	−1	**3**	
4	Gibraltar	3	0	0	3	0	11	−11	**0**	

Source: UEFA
Rules for classification: Qualification tiebreakers
(H) Hosts
6 October 2016
12:00

Albania	0–1	Republic of Ireland
	Report	Ronan 43' (pen.)

Selman Stërmasi Stadium, Tirana
Attendance: 250
Referee: Antti Munukka (Finland)
6 October 2016
14:00

Germany	5–0	Gibraltar
Eggestein 38'; Gül 48'; Baku 84', 90+3'; Touré 90+5'	Report

Niko Dovana Stadium, Durrës
Attendance: 100
Referee: Boris Marhefka (Slovakia)

8 October 2016
12:00

Republic of Ireland	5–0	Gibraltar
Hale 21'; Kinsella 36'; Leahy 79', 90+1'; Barrett 84'	Report

Niko Dovana Stadium, Durrës
Attendance: 150
Referee: Boris Marhefka (Slovakia)
8 October 2016
14:00

Germany	3–2	Albania
Köhlert 8'; Shipnoski 33'; Baku 45+1'	Report	Zeka 78' (pen.), 90+2'

Selman Stërmasi Stadium, Tirana
Attendance: 250
Referee: Sergejus Slyva (Lithuania)

11 October 2016
14:00

Republic of Ireland	0–4	Germany
	Report	Schmidt 24' (pen.), 52', 55' (pen.); Busam 65'

Niko Dovana Stadium, Durrës
Attendance: 100
Referee: Antti Munukka (Finland)
11 October 2016
14:00

Gibraltar	0–1	Albania
	Report	Zeka 8'

Selman Stërmasi Stadium, Tirana
Attendance: 200
Referee: Sergejus Slyva (Lithuania)

==== Group 5 ====
Pos	Team	Pld	W	D	L	GF	GA	GD	Pts	Qualification
1	Austria	3	3	0	0	10	4	+6	**9**	Elite round
2	Bosnia and Herzegovina	3	2	0	1	6	4	+2	**6**	Elite round
3	Azerbaijan	3	1	0	2	4	6	−2	**3**	
4	Lithuania (H)	3	0	0	3	2	8	−6	**0**	

Source: UEFA
Rules for classification: Qualification tiebreakers
(H) Hosts
4 October 2016
13:00

Austria	4–1	Azerbaijan
Jakupović 23', 66'; Kogler 46'; Lovrić 81'	Report	Krivotsyuk 41'

Sūduva Stadium, Marijampolė
Attendance: 50
Referee: Jonathan Lardot (Belgium)
4 October 2016
16:00

Lithuania	0–3	Bosnia and Herzegovina
	Report	Žerić 22'; Nikić 39'; Demirović 82' (pen.)

Alytus Stadium, Alytus
Attendance: 500
Referee: Georgi Kabakov (Bulgaria)

6 October 2016
13:00

Bosnia and Herzegovina	2–1	Azerbaijan
Suljić 39'; Hadžić 81'	Report	Khachaiev 68'

Sūduva Stadium, Marijampolė
Attendance: 50
Referee: Jonathan Lardot (Belgium)
6 October 2016
16:00

Austria	3–2	Lithuania
Hainka 10'; Jakupović 13'; Arase 67'	Report	Medelinskas 21', 90+4'

Alytus Stadium, Alytus
Attendance: 400
Referee: Georgios Kyzas (Greece)

9 October 2016
13:00

Bosnia and Herzegovina	1–3	Austria
Hadžić 6'	Report	Lovrić 33' (pen.); Danso 50'; Tüccar 90+3'

Sūduva Stadium, Marijampolė
Attendance: 50
Referee: Georgi Kabakov (Bulgaria)
9 October 2016
13:00

Azerbaijan	2–0	Lithuania
Nabiyev 33'; Muradov 45+1'	Report

Alytus Stadium, Alytus
Attendance: 250
Referee: Georgios Kyzas (Greece)

==== Group 6 ====
Pos	Team	Pld	W	D	L	GF	GA	GD	Pts	Qualification
1	England	3	2	0	1	6	3	+3	**6**	Elite round
2	Greece	3	2	0	1	7	2	+5	**6**	Elite round
3	Wales (H)	3	2	0	1	9	6	+3	**6**	
4	Luxembourg	3	0	0	3	2	13	−11	**0**	

Source: UEFA
Rules for classification: Qualification tiebreakers
(H) Hosts
10 November 2016
16:00

Wales	0–2	Greece
	Report	Mingos 59'; Nikolaou 78'

Racecourse Ground, Wrexham
Attendance: 131
Referee: Ivaylo Stoyanov (Bulgaria)
10 November 2016
18:00

England	2–0	Luxembourg
Mavididi 3'; Sessegnon 80'	Report

Belle Vue, Rhyl
Attendance: 183
Referee: Donatas Rumšas (Lithuania)

12 November 2016
16:00

Greece	5–0	Luxembourg
Limnios 1', 21'; Mingos 15'; Pavlidis 66', 73'	Report

Belle Vue, Rhyl
Attendance: 120
Referee: Ivaylo Stoyanov (Bulgaria)
12 November 2016
18:00

England	2–3	Wales
Harris 63' (o.g.); Alexander-Arnold 73' (pen.)	Report	Broadhead 35' (pen.), 75'; Harris 61'

Nantporth, Bangor
Attendance: 732
Referee: Benoît Millot (France)

15 November 2016
18:00

Greece	0–2	England
	Report	Alexander-Arnold 20' (pen.); Chalobah 63'

Belle Vue, Rhyl
Attendance: 260
Referee: Benoît Millot (France)
15 November 2016
18:00

Luxembourg	2–6	Wales
Da Costa 4'; Brandenburger 35' (pen.)	Report	Woodburn 21', 50'; Broadhead 38', 71', 81'; Cullen 54'

Nantporth, Bangor
Attendance: 592
Referee: Donatas Rumšas (Lithuania)

==== Group 7 ====
Pos	Team	Pld	W	D	L	GF	GA	GD	Pts	Qualification
1	Italy	3	2	1	0	4	2	+2	**7**	Elite round
2	Hungary	3	2	0	1	6	2	+4	**6**	Elite round
3	Switzerland	3	1	1	1	6	3	+3	**4**	
4	Armenia (H)	3	0	0	3	1	10	−9	**0**	

Source: UEFA
Rules for classification: Qualification tiebreakers
(H) Hosts
10 November 2016
12:00

Switzerland	4–0	Armenia
Schmid 15'; Muheim 25'; Domgjoni 58'; Qela 70'	Report

Banants Stadium, Yerevan
Attendance: 855
Referee: Danilo Grujić (Serbia)
10 November 2016
15:00

Hungary	0–1	Italy
	Report	Cutrone 70'

Football Academy Stadium, Yerevan
Attendance: 152
Referee: Andris Treimanis (Latvia)

12 November 2016
12:00

Italy	2–1	Armenia
Cutrone 13'; Marchizza 90+3' (pen.)	Report	Petrosyan 81'

Banants Stadium, Yerevan
Attendance: 670
Referee: Danilo Grujić (Serbia)
12 November 2016
15:00

Switzerland	1–2	Hungary
Guillemenot 62' (pen.)	Report	B. Tóth 55', 85' (pen.)

Football Academy Stadium, Yerevan
Attendance: 70
Referee: Ola Hobber Nilsen (Norway)

15 November 2016
12:00

Italy	1–1	Switzerland
Gabbia 16'	Report	Guillemenot 37'

Banants Stadium, Yerevan
Attendance: 200
Referee: Andris Treimanis (Latvia)
15 November 2016
12:00

Armenia	0–4	Hungary
	Report	Harutyunyan 18' (o.g.); B. Bíró 24'; Kleisz 87'; L. Szabó 90'

Football Academy Stadium, Yerevan
Attendance: 300
Referee: Ola Hobber Nilsen (Norway)

==== Group 8 ====
Pos	Team	Pld	W	D	L	GF	GA	GD	Pts	Qualification
1	Bulgaria (H)	3	2	0	1	4	2	+2	**6**	Elite round
2	Portugal	3	1	1	1	3	3	0	**4**	Elite round
3	Belarus	3	1	1	1	2	6	−4	**4**	Elite round
4	Denmark	3	1	0	2	7	5	+2	**3**	

Source: UEFA
Rules for classification: Qualification tiebreakers
(H) Hosts
10 November 2016
10:00

Bulgaria	1–0	Portugal
Vieira 21' (o.g.)	Report

Hadzhi Dimitar Stadium, Sliven
Attendance: 200
Referee: Alexander Harkam (Austria)
10 November 2016
13:30

Denmark	5–0	Belarus
Kudsk 9'; Buur 18'; Kabongo 38'; Bruun Larsen 39', 60'	Report

Trace Arena, Stara Zagora
Attendance: 50
Referee: Adrien Jaccottet (Switzerland)

12 November 2016
10:00

Portugal	1–1	Belarus
Luís 90+1'	Report	Lisakovich 79' (pen.)

Hadzhi Dimitar Stadium, Sliven
Attendance: 150
Referee: Adrien Jaccottet (Switzerland)
12 November 2016
13:30

Denmark	1–3	Bulgaria
Marcussen 11'	Report	Tilev 21'; Yordanov 64', 80'

Hadzhi Dimitar Stadium, Sliven
Attendance: 400
Referee: Mohammed Al-Hakim (Sweden)

15 November 2016
13:00

Portugal	2–1	Denmark
Dias 79' (pen.); Luís 88'	Report	Harboe Ramkilde 50'

Beroe Stadium, Stara Zagora
Attendance: 50
Referee: Alexander Harkam (Austria)
15 November 2016
13:00

Belarus	1–0	Bulgaria
Bakhar 83'	Report

Hadzhi Dimitar Stadium, Sliven
Attendance: 200
Referee: Mohammed Al-Hakim (Sweden)

==== Group 9 ====
Pos	Team	Pld	W	D	L	GF	GA	GD	Pts	Qualification
1	France	3	2	1	0	7	1	+6	**7**	Elite round
2	Czech Republic (H)	3	2	0	1	7	3	+4	**6**	Elite round
3	Slovenia	3	1	1	1	7	3	+4	**4**	
4	Estonia	3	0	0	3	0	14	−14	**0**	

Source: UEFA
Rules for classification: Qualification tiebreakers
(H) Hosts
6 October 2016
14:30

France	1–1	Slovenia
Souici 90+1'	Report	Mlakar 68'

Letní stadion, Chomutov
Attendance: 132
Referee: Andrew Dallas (Scotland)
6 October 2016
17:00

Estonia	0–5	Czech Republic
	Report	Turyna 17', 70'; Köstl 65'; Šašinka 85'; Chvěja 89'

Na Stínadlech, Teplice
Attendance: 428
Referee: Bojan Pandžić (Sweden)

8 October 2016
14:30

France	4–0	Estonia
Boutobba 8'; Édouard 63' (pen.), 77'; Ikoné 76'	Report

Na Stínadlech, Teplice
Attendance: 116
Referee: Bojan Pandžić (Sweden)
8 October 2016
17:00

Czech Republic	2–1	Slovenia
Sadílek 8'; Šašinka 16'	Report	Novak 5'

Městský stadion, Ústí nad Labem
Attendance: 204
Referee: Tiago Martins (Portugal)

11 October 2016
17:00

Czech Republic	0–2	France
	Report	Boutobba 20'; Édouard 66'

Městský stadion, Ústí nad Labem
Attendance: 446
Referee: Andrew Dallas (Scotland)
11 October 2016
17:00

Slovenia	5–0	Estonia
Mlakar 18'; Sredojevič 24', 59'; Čoralič 27'; Žižek 87'	Report

Letní stadion, Chomutov
Attendance: 69
Referee: Tiago Martins (Portugal)

==== Group 10 ====
Pos	Team	Pld	W	D	L	GF	GA	GD	Pts	Qualification
1	Sweden	3	3	0	0	8	2	+6	**9**	Elite round
2	Serbia (H)	3	2	0	1	5	3	+2	**6**	Elite round
3	Malta	3	1	0	2	1	5	−4	**3**	
4	Moldova	3	0	0	3	0	4	−4	**0**	

Source: UEFA
Rules for classification: Qualification tiebreakers
(H) Hosts
9 November 2016
14:00

Sweden	4–0	Malta
Lidberg 1'; Isherwood 17'; Hadžikadunić 66'; Gyökeres 87'	Report

Zemun Stadium, Belgrade
Attendance: 100
Referee: Kristo Tohver (Estonia)
9 November 2016
14:00

Moldova	0–2	Serbia
	Report	Dinga 84'; Nišić 90+4'

Sports Center of FA of Serbia, Stara Pazova
Attendance: 100
Referee: Tim Marshall (Northern Ireland)

11 November 2016
14:00

Sweden	1–0	Moldova
Lidberg 26'	Report

Sports Center of FA of Serbia, Stara Pazova
Attendance: 200
Referee: Peter Kjærsgaard-Andersen (Denmark)
11 November 2016
17:15

Serbia	1–0	Malta
Zlatanović 22'	Report

Sports Center of FA of Serbia, Stara Pazova
Attendance: 200
Referee: Tim Marshall (Northern Ireland)

14 November 2016
14:00

Serbia	2–3	Sweden
Birmančević 28'; Vlahović 55'	Report	Degerlund 42'; Karlsson 82'; Lidberg 90+1'

Sports Center of FA of Serbia, Stara Pazova
Attendance: 200
Referee: Kristo Tohver (Estonia)
14 November 2016
14:00

Malta	1–0	Moldova
Friggieri 72'	Report

Zemun Stadium, Belgrade
Attendance: 50
Referee: Peter Kjærsgaard-Andersen (Denmark)

==== Group 11 ====
Pos	Team	Pld	W	D	L	GF	GA	GD	Pts	Qualification
1	Slovakia	3	3	0	0	4	0	+4	**9**	Elite round
2	Poland (H)	3	2	0	1	7	1	+6	**6**	Elite round
3	Northern Ireland	3	1	0	2	2	5	−3	**3**	
4	Macedonia	3	0	0	3	1	8	−7	**0**	

Source: UEFA
Rules for classification: Qualification tiebreakers
(H) Hosts
6 October 2016
11:00

Northern Ireland	0–1	Slovakia
	Report	King 37' (o.g.)

Stadion Miejski, Toruń
Attendance: 50
Referee: Mads-Kristoffer Kristoffersen (Denmark)
6 October 2016
15:30

Macedonia	0–4	Poland
	Report	Jóźwiak 48'; Wojtkowski 65', 69'; Tomczyk 82'

Stadion Miejski, Szubin
Attendance: 817
Referee: Alain Bieri (Switzerland)

8 October 2016
11:00

Macedonia	1–2	Northern Ireland
Elmas 60'	Report	McKee 59'; McClean 90'

Stadion Miejski im. Inowrocławskich Olimpijczyków, Inowrocław
Attendance: 100
Referee: Erik Lambrechts (Belgium)
8 October 2016
15:30

Slovakia	1–0	Poland
Tupta 86'	Report

Stadion Miejski im. Inowrocławskich Olimpijczyków, Inowrocław
Attendance: 1,380
Referee: Alain Bieri (Switzerland)

11 October 2016
15:30

Slovakia	2–0	Macedonia
Baumgartner 55'; Jedinák 90+3'	Report

Stadion Miejski, Szubin
Attendance: 150
Referee: Mads-Kristoffer Kristoffersen Denmark)
11 October 2016
15:30

Poland	3–0 Awarded	Northern Ireland
Schikowski 60'	Report

Stadion Miejski, Toruń
Attendance: 900
Referee: Erik Lambrechts (Belgium)

The Poland v Northern Ireland match was completed with a 1–0 scoreline before a default victory was awarded.

==== Group 12 ====
Pos	Team	Pld	W	D	L	GF	GA	GD	Pts	Qualification
1	Croatia	3	3	0	0	11	1	+10	**9**	Elite round
2	Cyprus	3	2	0	1	2	4	−2	**6**	Elite round
3	Faroe Islands	3	1	0	2	2	7	−5	**3**	
4	Montenegro (H)	3	0	0	3	2	5	−3	**0**	

Source: UEFA
Rules for classification: Qualification tiebreakers
(H) Hosts
9 November 2016
12:00

Croatia	4–0	Cyprus
Lovren 37'; Soldo 52'; Majić 60'; Majer 61'	Report

Camp FSCG, Podgorica
Attendance: 40
Referee: Daniel Stefański (Poland)
9 November 2016
12:00

Faroe Islands	2–1	Montenegro
Agnarsson 49'; Muller 57'	Report	Drinčić 36'

Stadion pod Malim brdom, Petrovac
Attendance: 175
Referee: Andrew Davey (Northern Ireland)

11 November 2016
12:00

Croatia	5–0	Faroe Islands
Soldo 32'; Brekalo 37'; Kulenović 58'; Gjira 71'; Moro 85'	Report

Camp FSCG, Podgorica
Attendance: 50
Referee: Andrew Davey (Northern Ireland)
11 November 2016
12:00

Montenegro	0–1	Cyprus
	Report	Matthaiou 75'

Stadion pod Malim brdom, Petrovac
Attendance: 120
Referee: João Pinheiro (Portugal)

14 November 2016
12:00

Montenegro	1–2	Croatia
Krnić 85'	Report	Špikić 4'; Halilović 45+3'

Stadion pod Malim brdom, Petrovac
Attendance: 75
Referee: Daniel Stefański (Poland)
14 November 2016
12:00

Cyprus	1–0	Faroe Islands
Matthaiou 5' (pen.)	Report

Camp FSCG, Podgorica
Attendance: 40
Referee: João Pinheiro (Portugal)

==== Group 13 ====
Pos	Team	Pld	W	D	L	GF	GA	GD	Pts	Qualification
1	Turkey	3	2	1	0	7	4	+3	**7**	Elite round
2	Ukraine (H)	3	2	0	1	6	3	+3	**6**	Elite round
3	Iceland	3	1	0	2	3	4	−1	**3**	
4	Latvia	3	0	1	2	2	7	−5	**1**	

Source: UEFA
Rules for classification: Qualification tiebreakers
(H) Hosts
6 October 2016
14:00

Ukraine	2–0	Iceland
Smyrnyi 76'; Shaparenko 82'	Report

Kolos Stadium, Boryspil
Attendance: 221
Referee: Ognjen Valjić (Bosnia and Herzegovina)
6 October 2016
14:00

Latvia	2–2	Turkey
Davidenkovs 11'; Saveljevs 65'	Report	Demir 77'; Kahraman 84'

Stadion Yuvileinyi, Bucha
Attendance: 450
Referee: Neil Doyle (Republic of Ireland)

8 October 2016
14:00

Ukraine	3–0	Latvia
Alibekov 17' (pen.), 55' (pen.); Popov 90'	Report

Kolos Stadium, Boryspil
Attendance: 223
Referee: Filip Glova (Slovakia)
8 October 2016
14:00

Turkey	2–1	Iceland
Yüksel 10'; Arslan 82'	Report	Andrésson 69'

Stadion Yuvileinyi, Bucha
Attendance: 400
Referee: Neil Doyle (Republic of Ireland)

11 October 2016
14:00

Turkey	3–1	Ukraine
Koçaklı 56', 63'; Yüksel 85'	Report	Dubinchak 19'

Kolos Stadium, Boryspil
Attendance: 400
Referee: Ognjen Valjić (Bosnia and Herzegovina)
11 October 2016
14:00

Iceland	2–0	Latvia
Guðjohnsen 19'; Andrésson 88'	Report

Stadion Yuvileinyi, Bucha
Attendance: 200
Referee: Filip Glova (Slovakia)

=== Ranking of third-placed teams ===
To determine the best third-placed team from the qualifying round which advance to the elite round, only the results of the third-placed teams against the first and second-placed teams in their group are taken into account.

Pos	Grp	Team	Pld	W	D	L	GF	GA	GD	Pts	Qualification
1	8	Belarus	2	1	1	0	2	1	+1	4	Elite round
2	6	Wales	2	1	0	1	3	4	−1	3	
3	1	Russia	2	0	2	0	3	3	0	2	
4	7	Switzerland	2	0	1	1	2	3	−1	1 (Note: Tie broken by disciplinary points.)	
5	9	Slovenia	2	0	1	1	2	3	−1	1	
6	4	Albania	2	0	0	2	2	4	−2	0 (Note: Tie broken by disciplinary points.)	
7	3	Andorra	2	0	0	2	2	4	−2	0	
8	2	Romania	2	0	0	2	2	5	−3	0	
9	13	Iceland	2	0	0	2	1	4	−3	0	
10	5	Azerbaijan	2	0	0	2	2	6	−4	0	
11	11	Northern Ireland	2	0	0	2	0	4	−4	0	
12	10	Malta	2	0	0	2	0	5	−5	0	
13	12	Faroe Islands	2	0	0	2	0	6	−6	0	

Source: UEFA
Rules for classification: 1) points; 2) goal difference; 3) goals scored; 4) disciplinary points; 5) coefficient; 6) drawing of lots.

== Elite round ==
=== Draw ===
The draw for the elite round was held on 13 December 2016, 11:00 CET (UTC+1), at the UEFA headquarters in Nyon, Switzerland.

The teams were seeded according to their results in the qualifying round. Spain, which received a bye to the elite round, were automatically seeded into Pot A. Each group contained one team from Pot A, one team from Pot B, one team from Pot C, and one team from Pot D. Winners and runners-up from the same qualifying round group could not be drawn in the same group, but the best third-placed team (Belarus) could be drawn in the same group as winners or runners-up from the same qualifying round group.

Pos	Grp	Team	Pld	W	D	L	GF	GA	GD	Pts	Seeding
1	—	Spain	0	0	0	0	0	0	0	0	Pot A
2	4	Germany	3	3	0	0	12	2	+10	9	Pot A
3	12	Croatia	3	3	0	0	11	1	+10	9	Pot A
4	3	Israel	3	3	0	0	9	2	+7	9	Pot A
5	5	Austria	3	3	0	0	10	4	+6	9	Pot A
6	10	Sweden	3	3	0	0	8	2	+6	9	Pot A
7	2	Netherlands	3	3	0	0	7	1	+6	9	Pot A
8	11	Slovakia	3	3	0	0	4	0	+4	9	Pot B
9	9	France	3	2	1	0	7	1	+6	7	Pot B
10	13	Turkey	3	2	1	0	7	4	+3	7	Pot B
11	7	Italy	3	2	1	0	4	2	+2	7	Pot B
12	2	Norway	3	2	0	1	12	2	+10	6	Pot B
13	6	Greece	3	2	0	1	7	2	+5	6	Pot B
14	9	Czech Republic	3	2	0	1	7	3	+4	6	Pot B
15	7	Hungary	3	2	0	1	6	2	+4	6	Pot C
16	11	Poland	3	2	0	1	5	1	+4	6 (Note: Poland were seeded according to their results in the qualifying round before their default victory against Northern Ireland was awarded.)	Pot C
17	6	England	3	2	0	1	6	3	+3	6 (Note: Tie broken by disciplinary points.)	Pot C
18	13	Ukraine	3	2	0	1	6	3	+3	6	Pot C
19	5	Bosnia and Herzegovina	3	2	0	1	6	4	+2	6 (Note: Tie broken by disciplinary points.)	Pot C
20	4	Republic of Ireland	3	2	0	1	6	4	+2	6	Pot C
21	10	Serbia	3	2	0	1	5	3	+2	6	Pot C
22	8	Bulgaria	3	2	0	1	4	2	+2	6	Pot D
23	3	Scotland	3	2	0	1	2	1	+1	6	Pot D
24	12	Cyprus	3	2	0	1	2	4	−2	6	Pot D
25	1	Finland	3	1	2	0	9	3	+6	5	Pot D
26	1	Belgium	3	1	2	0	9	4	+5	5	Pot D
27	8	Portugal	3	1	1	1	3	3	0	4	Pot D
28	8	Belarus	3	1	1	1	2	6	−4	4	Pot D

Source: UEFA
Rules for classification: 1) points; 2) goal difference; 3) goals scored; 4) disciplinary points; 5) coefficient; 6) drawing of lots.

=== Groups ===
The elite round must be played on the following FIFA International Match Calendar dates unless all four teams agree to play on another date:

- 20–28 March 2017

Times up to 25 March 2017 are CET (UTC+1), thereafter times are CEST (UTC+2).

==== Group 1 ====
Pos	Team	Pld	W	D	L	GF	GA	GD	Pts	Qualification
1	Netherlands (H)	3	2	1	0	3	0	+3	7	Final tournament
2	Greece	3	1	1	1	4	3	+1	4	
3	Finland	3	1	0	2	3	6	−3	3	
4	Ukraine	3	1	0	2	3	4	−1	3	

Source: UEFA
Rules for classification: Qualification tiebreakers
(H) Hosts
23 March 2017
16:00

Netherlands	1–0	Finland
Pikkarainen 88' (o.g.)	Report

Sportpark Marsdijk, Assen
Attendance: 2,060
Referee: Craig Pawson (England)
23 March 2017
19:00

Ukraine	2–0	Greece
Mykolenko 45+2'; Rusyn 49'	Report

Sportpark de Bosk, Harkema
Attendance: 200
Referee: Srđan Jovanović (Serbia)

25 March 2017
14:00

Greece	4–1	Finland
Kampetsis 48', 90+1'; Pavlidis 62'; Vrousai 88'	Report	Eremenko 18' (pen.)

Sportpark Marsdijk, Assen
Attendance: 250
Referee: Srđan Jovanović (Serbia)
25 March 2017
17:00

Netherlands	2–0	Ukraine
Kadioglu 80' (pen.), 88'	Report

Sportpark de Bosk, Harkema
Attendance: 1,000
Referee: Daniyar Sakhi (Kazakhstan)

28 March 2017
17:00

Greece	0–0	Netherlands
	Report

Sportpark Marsdijk, Assen
Attendance: 3,485
Referee: Craig Pawson (England)
28 March 2017
17:00

Finland	2–1	Ukraine
Lappalainen 31', 51'	Report	Yanakov 90+3'

Sportpark de Bosk, Harkema
Attendance: 35
Referee: Daniyar Sakhi (Kazakhstan)

==== Group 2 ====
Pos	Team	Pld	W	D	L	GF	GA	GD	Pts	Qualification
1	Germany (H)	3	3	0	0	8	1	+7	9	Final tournament
2	Serbia	3	1	1	1	1	2	−1	4	
3	Slovakia	3	1	0	2	5	5	0	3	
4	Cyprus	3	0	1	2	1	7	−6	1	

Source: UEFA
Rules for classification: Qualification tiebreakers
(H) Hosts
23 March 2017
11:00

Germany	2–1	Cyprus
Amenyido 3', 90+3'	Report	Matthaiou 16'

Stadion am Sommerdamm, Rüsselsheim am Main
Attendance: 1,102
Referee: Tomasz Musiał (Poland)
23 March 2017
16:00

Serbia	1–0	Slovakia
Jovanović 62'	Report

Stadion am Sommerdamm, Rüsselsheim am Main
Attendance: 312
Referee: Massimiliano Irrati (Italy

25 March 2017
11:00

Germany	2–0	Serbia
Barkok 44'; Busam 87'	Report

Sportpark Kelsterbach, Kelsterbach
Attendance: 1,651
Referee: Bojan Pandžić (Sweden)
25 March 2017
16:00

Slovakia	5–0	Cyprus
Tupta 37', 40'; Štefanec 68'; Herc 75'; Dubec 90+1'	Report

Sportpark Kelsterbach, Kelsterbach
Attendance: 155
Referee: Tomasz Musiał (Poland)

28 March 2017
17:00

Slovakia	0–4	Germany
	Report	Hack 5'; Özcan 18'; Amenyido 57', 75'

Stadion am Bornheimer Hang, Frankfurt
Attendance: 1,543
Referee: Massimiliano Irrati (Italy)
28 March 2017
17:00

Cyprus	0–0	Serbia
	Report

Stadion am Sommerdamm, Rüsselsheim am Main
Attendance: 168
Referee: Bojan Pandžić (Sweden)

==== Group 3 ====
Pos	Team	Pld	W	D	L	GF	GA	GD	Pts	Qualification
1	England (H)	3	3	0	0	11	1	+10	9	Final tournament
2	Spain	3	2	0	1	7	3	+4	6	
3	Norway	3	1	0	2	2	6	−4	3	
4	Belarus	3	0	0	3	2	12	−10	0	

Source: UEFA
Rules for classification: Qualification tiebreakers
(H) Hosts
22 March 2017
15:00

Spain	5–0	Belarus
Óscar 16'; Gómez 37', 74'; Mboula 72', 90+2'	Report

St George's Park Pitch 4, Burton-on-Trent
Attendance: 35
Referee: Bojan Nikolić (Serbia)
22 March 2017
15:00

England	3–0	Norway
Mount 32'; Edun 46'; Field 55'	Report

St George's Park Main Stadium, Burton-on-Trent
Attendance: 162
Referee: Erez Papir (Israel)

24 March 2017
15:00

Spain	0–3	England
	Report	Alexander-Arnold 9', 64' (pen.); Willock 86'

St George's Park Main Stadium, Burton-on-Trent
Attendance: 232
Referee: Bastian Dankert (Germany)
24 March 2017
15:00

Norway	2–1	Belarus
Grødem 19'; Ajer 27' (pen.)	Report	Dichenkov 61'

St George's Park Pitch 4, Burton-on-Trent
Attendance: 36
Referee: Bojan Nikolić (Serbia)

27 March 2017
15:00

Norway	0–2	Spain
	Report	Gómez 45+2'; Mboula 68'

Harrison Park, Leek
Attendance: 67
Referee: Bastian Dankert (Germany)
27 March 2017
15:00

Belarus	1–5	England
Mukhamedov 5'	Report	Nmecha 15'; Buckley-Ricketts 24'; Edwards 57'; Willock 61', 74'

St George's Park Main Stadium, Burton-on-Trent
Attendance: 182
Referee: Erez Papir (Israel)

==== Group 4 ====
Pos	Team	Pld	W	D	L	GF	GA	GD	Pts	Qualification
1	Portugal (H)	3	2	0	1	6	4	+2	6	Final tournament
2	Croatia	3	1	1	1	3	2	+1	4	
3	Turkey	3	1	1	1	2	2	0	4	
4	Poland	3	1	0	2	2	5	−3	3	

Source: UEFA
Rules for classification: Qualification tiebreakers
(H) Hosts
23 March 2017
15:00

Poland	1–0	Turkey
Hołownia 48'	Report

Complexo Desportivo Clube de Futebol de Fão, Apúlia e Fão
Attendance: 200
Referee: Þorvaldur Árnason (Iceland)
23 March 2017
17:00

Croatia	1–2	Portugal
Ivanušec 28'	Report	Djú 8'; Jota 90' (pen.)

Estádio da Mata Real, Paços de Ferreira
Attendance: 700
Referee: Manuel Schüttengruber (Austria)

25 March 2017
15:00

Croatia	2–0	Poland
Kalaica 5'; Brekalo 13' (pen.)	Report

Estádio dos Arcos, Vila do Conde
Attendance: 200
Referee: Sandro Schärer (Switzerland)
25 March 2017
17:00

Turkey	2–1	Portugal
Özcan 82', 88'	Report	Gomes 15'

Estádio da Mata Real, Paços de Ferreira
Attendance: 1,000
Referee: Manuel Schüttengruber (Austria)

28 March 2017
17:00

Turkey	0–0	Croatia
	Report

Estádio Dr. Machado de Matos, Felgueiras
Attendance: 120
Referee: Sandro Schärer (Switzerland)
28 March 2017
17:00

Portugal	3–1	Poland
Rui Pedro 39', 82'; Queirós 75'	Report	Listkowski 29'

Estádio Cidade de Barcelos, Barcelos
Attendance: 750
Referee: Þorvaldur Árnason (Iceland)

==== Group 5 ====
Pos	Team	Pld	W	D	L	GF	GA	GD	Pts	Qualification
1	Bulgaria	3	2	1	0	6	3	+3	7	Final tournament
2	Bosnia and Herzegovina	3	1	1	1	4	4	0	4	
3	Israel	3	0	3	0	2	2	0	3	
4	France (H)	3	0	1	2	1	4	−3	1	

Source: UEFA
Rules for classification: Qualification tiebreakers
(H) Hosts
22 March 2017
16:00

Bosnia and Herzegovina	2–0	France
Demirović 40'; Ćavar 90+2'	Report

Stade Jules Ladoumègue, Romorantin-Lanthenay
Attendance: 2,250
Referee: Dimitrios Massias (Cyprus)
22 March 2017
19:00

Israel	1–1	Bulgaria
Abu Fani 56'	Report	Genchev 86'

Stade municipal des Allées Jean Leroi, Blois
Attendance: 457
Referee: José María Sánchez Martínez (Spain)

24 March 2017
16:30

Israel	1–1	Bosnia and Herzegovina
Abu Fani 18'	Report	Mustedanagić 3'

Stade Jules Ladoumègue, Romorantin-Lanthenay
Attendance: 452
Referee: Ádám Farkas (Hungary)
24 March 2017
19:00

France	1–2	Bulgaria
Diaby 66'	Report	Krastev 14'; Yordanov 56'

Stade municipal des Allées Jean Leroi, Blois
Attendance: 1,828
Referee: Dimitrios Massias (Cyprus)

27 March 2017
19:00

France	0–0	Israel
	Report

Stade municipal des Allées Jean Leroi, Blois
Attendance: 1,450
Referee: José María Sánchez Martínez (Spain)
27 March 2017
19:00

Bulgaria	3–1	Bosnia and Herzegovina
Rusev 4' (pen.); Krastev 29', 45+1'	Report	Demirović 64'

Stade Municipal, Vineuil
Attendance: 428
Referee: Ádám Farkas (Hungary)

==== Group 6 ====
Pos	Team	Pld	W	D	L	GF	GA	GD	Pts	Qualification
1	Czech Republic (H)	3	3	0	0	6	1	+5	9	Final tournament
2	Hungary	3	2	0	1	6	4	+2	6	
3	Austria	3	1	0	2	4	6	−2	3	
4	Scotland	3	0	0	3	1	6	−5	0	

Source: UEFA
Rules for classification: Qualification tiebreakers
(H) Hosts
22 March 2017
11:00

Austria	3–0	Scotland
Arase 8'; Jakupović 65' (pen.); Lovrić 79' (pen.)	Report

Letná Stadion, Zlín
Attendance: 154
Referee: Charalambos Kalogeropoulos (Greece)
22 March 2017
17:00

Hungary	1–2	Czech Republic
Csernik 58'	Report	Lingr 16'; Turyna 27'

Městský fotbalový stadion Miroslava Valenty, Uherské Hradiště
Attendance: 514
Referee: Laurent Kopriwa (Luxembourg)

24 March 2017
11:00

Austria	1–3	Hungary
Sahanek 22'	Report	Tömösvári 36'; Á. Bíró 44'; L. Szabó 90+3'

Městský fotbalový stadion Miroslava Valenty, Uherské Hradiště
Attendance: 132
Referee: Manfredas Lukjančukas (Lithuania)
24 March 2017
17:00

Czech Republic	1–0	Scotland
Šašinka 78' (pen.)	Report

Letná Stadion, Zlín
Attendance: 1,394
Referee: Laurent Kopriwa (Luxembourg)

27 March 2017
19:00

Czech Republic	3–0	Austria
Sahanek 2' (o.g.); Mareček 76'; Sadílek 89'	Report

Městský fotbalový stadion Miroslava Valenty, Uherské Hradiště
Attendance: 1,734
Referee: Charalambos Kalogeropoulos (Greece)
27 March 2017
19:00

Scotland	1–2	Hungary
Johnston 74' (pen.)	Report	B. Bíró 35'; B. Szabó 87' (pen.)

Letná Stadion, Zlín
Attendance: 69
Referee: Manfredas Lukjančukas (Lithuania)

==== Group 7 ====
Pos	Team	Pld	W	D	L	GF	GA	GD	Pts	Qualification
1	Sweden	3	2	0	1	5	2	+3	6	Final tournament
2	Republic of Ireland	3	2	0	1	3	3	0	6	
3	Belgium (H)	3	1	1	1	3	3	0	4	
4	Italy	3	0	1	2	1	4	−3	1	

Source: UEFA
Rules for classification: Qualification tiebreakers
(H) Hosts
23 March 2017
16:00

Sweden	1–2	Belgium
Ingelsson 17'	Report	Verstraete 37'; Rigo 82'

Freethiel Stadion, Beveren
Attendance: 850
Referee: François Letexier (France)
23 March 2017
19:00

Republic of Ireland	2–0	Italy
Levingston 34'; Hale 73' (pen.)	Report

Gemeentelijk Stadion Vigor Wuitens Hamme, Hamme
Attendance: 400
Referee: Nikola Dabanović (Montenegro)

25 March 2017
14:00

Sweden	3–0	Republic of Ireland
Ingelsson 25'; Sabovic 52'; Isak 73'	Report

Freethiel Stadion, Beveren
Attendance: 175
Referee: Cătălin Găman (Romania)
25 March 2017
15:00

Italy	1–1	Belgium
Maggiore 90'	Report	Verreth 80'

Gemeentelijk Stadion Vigor Wuitens Hamme, Hamme
Attendance: 800
Referee: Nikola Dabanović (Montenegro)

28 March 2017
19:00

Italy	0–1	Sweden
	Report	Gyökeres 69'

Gemeentelijk Stadion Vigor Wuitens Hamme, Hamme
Attendance: 150
Referee: François Letexier (France)
28 March 2017
19:00

Belgium	0–1	Republic of Ireland
	Report	Faes 21' (o.g.)

Freethiel Stadion, Beveren
Attendance: 1,200
Referee: Cătălin Găman (Romania)

== Qualified teams ==
The following eight teams qualify for the final tournament.

Team	Qualified as	Qualified on	Previous appearances in tournament^{1} only U-19 era (since 2002)
Georgia	Hosts	26 January 2015	1 (2013)
Netherlands	Elite round Group 1 winners	28 March 2017	4 (2010, 2013, 2015, 2016)
Germany	Elite round Group 2 winners	28 March 2017	8 (2002, 2004, 2005, 2007, **2008**, **2014**, 2015, 2016)
England	Elite round Group 3 winners	24 March 2017	8 (2002, 2003, 2005, 2008, 2009, 2010, 2012, 2016)
Portugal	Elite round Group 4 winners	28 March 2017	8 (2003, 2006, 2007, 2010, 2012, 2013, 2014, 2016)
Bulgaria	Elite round Group 5 winners	27 March 2017	2 (2008, 2014)
Czech Republic	Elite round Group 6 winners	27 March 2017	5 (2002, 2003, 2006, 2008, 2011)
Sweden	Elite round Group 7 winners	28 March 2017	0 (debut)

^{1} Bold indicates champion for that year. Italic indicates host for that year.

== Top goalscorers ==
The following players scored four goals or more in the qualifying competition:

5 goals

- (Finland) Lassi Lappalainen
- (Norway) Birk Risa
- (Republic of Ireland) Nathan Broadhead

4 goals

- (Austria) Arnel Jakupović
- (Belgium) Matthias Verreth
- (England) Trent Alexander-Arnold
- (Germany) Etienne Amenyido

Source: UEFA.com
