= 2016–17 FC Porto season =

Porto
2016–17 season
- President: Jorge Nuno Pinto da Costa
- Head coach: Nuno Espírito Santo
- Stadium: Estádio do Dragão
- Primeira Liga: 2nd
- Taça de Portugal: Fourth round
- Taça da Liga: Third round
- UEFA Champions League: Round of 16
- Top goalscorer: League: André Silva (16); All: André Silva (21)
- Highest home attendance: 50,019; Porto 1–1 Benfica (6 November 2016)
- Lowest home attendance: 14,228; Porto 3–1 Belenenses (29 November 2016)
- Average home league attendance: 37,130
Home colours	Away colours	Third colours

The 2016–17 FC Porto season was the club's 107th competitive season and the 83rd consecutive season in the top flight of Portuguese football. It began on 12 August 2016 and concluded on 21 May 2017. For the third consecutive season, Porto failed to win any of the official competitions in which it was involved. The last time the team had at least three successive seasons without winning a trophy was before 1976–77.

As in the previous two seasons, Porto did not begin their campaign by playing the Supertaça Cândido de Oliveira, as they failed to qualify for the 2016 edition by not winning either the 2015–16 Primeira Liga title (retained by Benfica) or the 2015–16 Taça de Portugal (final lost to Braga). Their 2016–17 Primeira Liga debut match was a 3–1 away win against Rio Ave, with Mexican winger Jesús Corona scoring the team's first league goal. Porto finished the league in second place with 76 points, 6 points behind four-time champions Benfica, thus failing to win the title for the fourth successive season, which had not happened since the 1982–83 season.

Besides competing for the Primeira Liga title, Porto participated in other domestic competitions. In the 2016–17 Taça de Portugal, they were eliminated in the fourth round by Chaves, losing 3–2 after a penalty shootout. The team also participated in the 2016–17 Taça da Liga, but were eliminated in the starting round for the second consecutive season after finishing last in their third-round group.

In UEFA competitions, Porto secured their sixth consecutive and 21st overall participation in the UEFA Champions League group stage – a record shared with Barcelona and Real Madrid – after overcoming the play-off round. They reached the round of 16, where they were eliminated by eventual losing finalists Juventus.

== Players ==
=== Squad information ===
N	Pos.	Nat.	Name	Age	EU	Since	App	Goals	Ends	Transfer fee	Notes
1	GK	(Spain)	Iker Casillas	45	EU	2015	83	0	2017	Undisclosed	
2	DF	(Uruguay)	Maxi Pereira	42	EU	2015	77	3	2018	Free	
4	DF	(France)	Willy Boly	35	EU	2016	8	0	2021	€6.5M	
5	DF	(Spain)	Iván Marcano	39	EU	2014	111	7	2018	€2.65M	
6	MF	(Portugal)	Rúben Neves	29	EU	2014	93	4	2019	Youth system	
8	FW	(Algeria)	Yacine Brahimi	36	EU	2014	117	29	2019	€6.5M	Second nationality: France
9	FW	(Belgium)	Laurent Depoitre	37	EU	2016	13	2	2020	€6M	
10	FW	(Portugal)	André Silva	30	EU	2015	58	24	2019	Youth system	
12	GK	(Portugal)	José Sá	33	EU	2016	6	0	2020	Undisclosed	
13	DF	(Brazil)	Alex Telles	33	EU	2016	45	1	2021	€6.5M	Second nationality: Italy
16	MF	(Mexico)	Héctor Herrera	36	Non-EU	2013	150	21	2019	€8M	
17	FW	(Mexico)	Jesús Corona	33	Non-EU	2015	76	14	2020	€10.5M	
18	MF	(Portugal)	João Carlos Teixeira	33	EU	2016	10	0	2020	Free	
19	FW	(Portugal)	Diogo Jota	29	EU	2016	38	9	2017	—	Loan from Atlético Madrid
20	MF	(Portugal)	André André	37	EU	2015	70	7	2019	€1.5M	
21	DF	(Mexico)	Miguel Layún	38	EU	2015	66	9	2019	€6M	Second nationality: Spain
22	MF	(Portugal)	Danilo Pereira	35	EU	2015	86	10	2019	€2.8M	
24	GK	(Portugal)	João Costa	30	EU	2016	0	0	Undisclosed	Youth system	Also plays for Porto B
25	MF	(Brazil)	Otávio	31	Non-EU	2014	33	3	2021	€2.5M	
28	DF	(Brazil)	Felipe	37	Non-EU	2016	45	3	2021	€6M	
29	FW	(Brazil)	Soares	35	Non-EU	2017	17	12	2021	€5.6M	
30	MF	(Spain)	Óliver Torres	31	EU	2014	79	10	2017	—	Loan from Atlético Madrid
33	DF	(Nigeria)	Chidozie Awaziem	29	EU	2016	13	1	2020	Undisclosed	Also plays for Porto B
45	DF	(Brazil)	Inácio	30	EU	2016	1	0	2021	€3M	Also plays for Porto B
59	FW	(Portugal)	Rui Pedro	28	EU	2016	13	2	2021	Youth system	Also plays for Porto B

- Source: FC Porto,
- Ordered by squad number.

=== Transfers ===
==== In ====
Date	Pos.	Name	Nationality	Age	Transferred from	Window	Until	Fee	Ref.
28 May 2016	DF	Miguel Layún	Mexico	38	Watford (England)	Summer	2019	€6M	
13 June 2016	MF	João Carlos Teixeira	Portugal	33	Liverpool (England)	Summer	2020	Free (end of contract)	
15 June 2016	DF	Felipe	Brazil	37	Corinthians (Brazil)	Summer	2021	€6M	
28 June 2016	FW	Zé Manuel	Portugal	35	Boavista (Portugal)	Summer	Undisclosed	Undisclosed	
12 July 2016	DF	Alex Telles	Brazil	33	Galatasaray (Turkey)	Summer	2021	€6.5M	
8 August 2016	FW	Laurent Depoitre	Belgium	37	Gent (Belgium)	Summer	2020	€6M	
31 August 2016	DF	Willy Boly	France	35	Braga (Portugal)	Summer	2021	€6.5M	
23 January 2017	FW	Soares	Brazil	35	Vitória de Guimarães (Portugal)	Winter	2021	€5.6M	

==== Loan in ====
Date	Pos.	Name	Nationality	Age	Loaned from	Window	Until	Ref.
25 August 2016	MF	Óliver Torres	Spain	31	Atlético Madrid (Spain)	Summer	31 December 2017	
26 August 2016	FW	Diogo Jota	Portugal	29	Atlético Madrid (Spain)	Summer	30 June 2017	

==== Loan return ====
Date	Pos.	Name	Nationality	Age	Returned from	Window	Until	Ref.
1 July 2016	MF	Otávio	Brazil	31	Vitória de Guimarães (Portugal)	Summer	30 June 2021	
1 July 2016	FW	Adrián López	Spain	38	Villarreal (Spain)	Summer	30 June 2019	
1 January 2017	FW	Kelvin	Brazil	33	São Paulo (Brazil)	Winter	30 June 2018	

==== Out ====
Date	Pos.	Name	Nationality	Age	Transferred to	Window	Fee	Ref.
31 August 2016	FW	Licá	Portugal	38	Nottingham Forest (England)	Summer	Undisclosed	
13 January 2017	MF	Evandro	Brazil	40	Hull City (England)	Winter	Undisclosed	
21 January 2017	MF	Silvestre Varela	Portugal	41	Kayserispor (Turkey)	Winter	Undisclosed	

==== Loan out ====
Date	Pos.	Name	Nationality	Age	Loaned to	Window	Until	Ref.
6 June 2016	MF	Tiago Rodrigues	Portugal	34	Nacional (Portugal)	Summer	30 June 2017	
8 June 2016	GK	Ricardo Nunes	Portugal	44	Chaves (Portugal)	Summer	30 June 2017	
1 July 2016	GK	Fabiano	Brazil	38	Fenerbahçe (Turkey)	Summer	30 June 2017	
20 July 2016	FW	Moussa Marega	Mali	35	Vitória de Guimarães (Portugal)	Summer	30 June 2017	
20 July 2016	FW	Zé Manuel	Portugal	35	Vitória de Setúbal (Portugal)	Summer	30 June 2017	
23 July 2016	GK	Andrés Fernández	Spain	39	Villarreal (Spain)	Summer	30 June 2017	
23 July 2016	DF	José Ángel	Spain	37	Villarreal (Spain)	Summer	30 June 2017	
26 July 2016	DF	Abdoulaye Ba	Senegal	35	Alanyaspor (Turkey)	Summer	25 January 2017	
26 July 2016	FW	Leocísio Sami	Guinea-Bissau	37	Akhisar Belediyespor (Turkey)	Summer	30 June 2017	
2 August 2016	DF	Igor Lichnovsky	Chile	32	Valladolid (Spain)	Summer	30 June 2017	
11 August 2016	FW	Suk Hyun-jun	South Korea	35	Trabzonspor (Turkey)	Summer	30 June 2017	
23 August 2016	MF	Josué	Portugal	36	Galatasaray (Turkey)	Summer	30 June 2017	
25 August 2016	FW	Hernâni	Portugal	35	Vitória de Guimarães (Portugal)	Summer	30 June 2017	
27 August 2016	FW	Vincent Aboubakar	Cameroon	34	Beşiktaş (Turkey)	Summer	30 June 2017	
31 August 2016	GK	Sinan Bolat	Turkey	38	Nacional (Portugal)	Summer	30 June 2017	
31 August 2016	DF	Bruno Martins Indi	Netherlands	34	Stoke City (England)	Summer	30 June 2017	
31 August 2016	DF	Diego Reyes	Mexico	34	Espanyol (Spain)	Summer	30 June 2017	
31 August 2016	FW	Alberto Bueno	Spain	38	Granada (Spain)	Summer	31 January 2017	
31 August 2016	FW	Nabil Ghilas	Algeria	36	Gaziantepspor (Turkey)	Summer	30 June 2018	
13 September 2016	MF	Juan Quintero	Colombia	33	Independiente Medellín (Colombia)	Summer	31 December 2017	
21 January 2017	FW	Adrián López	Spain	38	Villarreal (Spain)	Winter	30 June 2017	
25 January 2017	DF	Abdoulaye Ba	Senegal	35	1860 Munich (Germany)	Winter	30 June 2017	
31 January 2017	FW	Alberto Bueno	Spain	38	Leganés (Spain)	Winter	30 June 2017	
31 January 2017	MF	Sérgio Oliveira	Portugal	34	Nantes (France)	Winter	30 June 2017	
3 February 2017	FW	Kelvin	Brazil	33	Vasco da Gama (Brazil)	Winter	30 June 2018	

== Technical staff ==
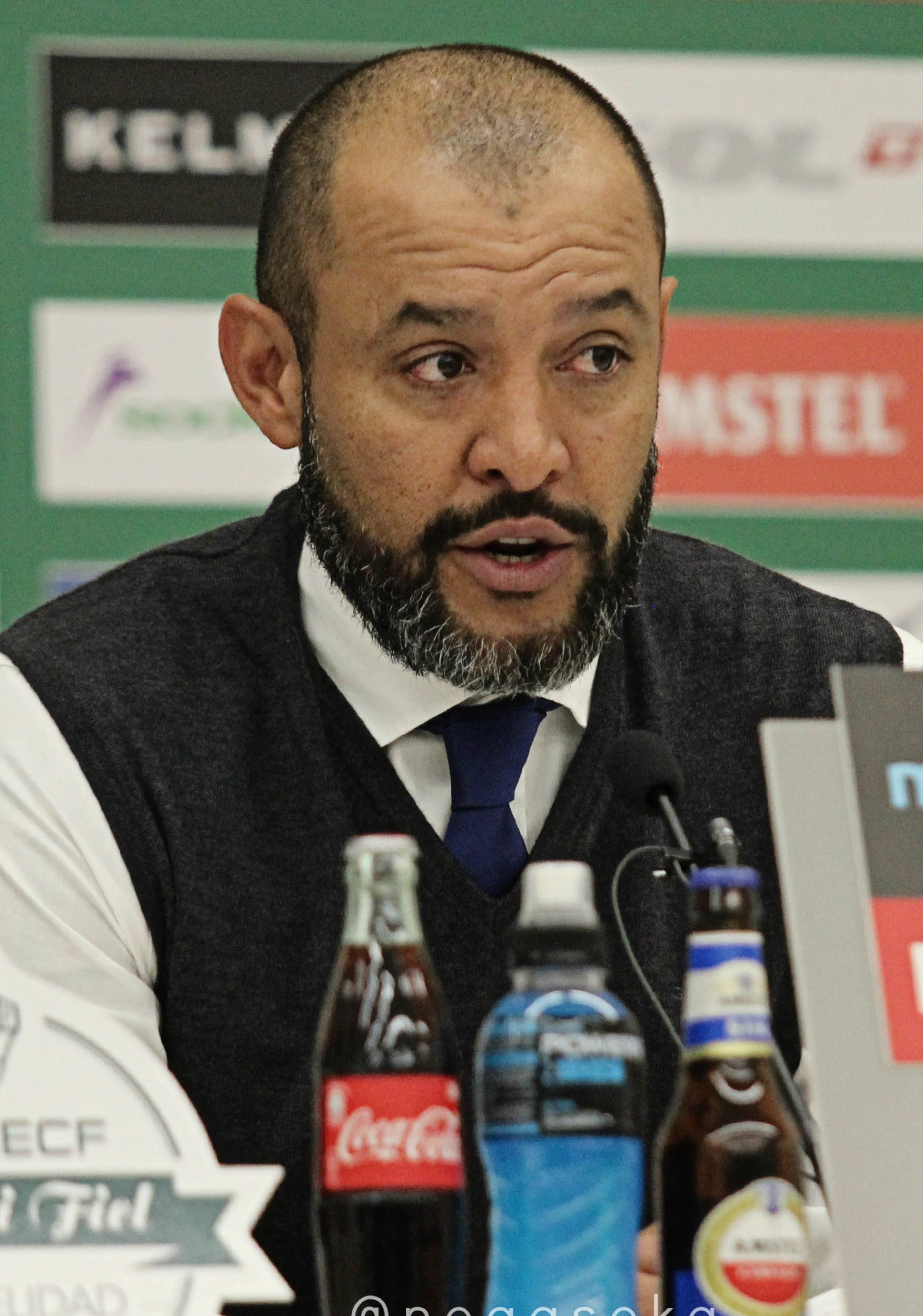
Nuno Espírito Santo, the incumbent head coach

Position	Name
Head coach	(Portugal) Nuno Espírito Santo
Assistant coach(es)	(Portugal) Rui Barros (Portugal) Rui Pedro Silva
Goalkeeping coach	(Portugal) Rui Barbosa
Fitness coach	(Portugal) António Dias

Source: FC Porto

== Pre-season and friendlies ==
Porto announced their pre-season fixture list on 22 June 2016.

Win Draw Loss

17 July 2016 Friendly	VfL Osnabrück	1–2	Porto	Oer-Erkenschwick, Germany
17:00 CEST (UTC+02:00)	Heider 6'		Marcano 34'; Silva 64'	Stadium: Stimbergstadion; Referee: Benjamin Bläser (Germany)

21 July 2016 Fox Sports Cup	Porto	0–3	PSV	Arnhem, Netherlands
21:00 CEST (UTC+02:00)			Pröpper 23'; Felipe 35' (o.g.); Maher 76'	Stadium: GelreDome; Referee: Ed Janssen (Netherlands)

23 July 2016 Fox Sports Cup	Vitesse	1–2	Porto	Arnhem, Netherlands
15:30 CEST (UTC+02:00)	Baker 18'		Corona 79'; Silva 83' (pen.)	Stadium: GelreDome; Referee: Kevin Blom (Netherlands)

27 July 2016 Friendly	Bayer Leverkusen	1–1	Porto	Bergisch Gladbach, Germany
18:00 CEST (UTC+02:00)	Hernández 58'		Silva 8'	Stadium: BELKAW-Arena; Referee: Sascha Stegemann (Germany)

31 July 2016 Guimarães Trophy	Vitória de Guimarães	0–2	Porto	Guimarães, Portugal
20:00 WEST (UTC+01:00)			Silva 9', 32'	Stadium: Estádio D. Afonso Henriques; Attendance: 7,811; Referee: Carlos Xistra (Castelo Branco)

6 August 2016 Presentation	Porto	1–0	Villarreal	Porto, Portugal
21:30 WEST (UTC+01:00)	Silva 13'			Stadium: Estádio do Dragão; Attendance: 46,110; Referee: Manuel Oliveira (Portugal)

== Competitions ==
=== Overall record ===
Performance by competition
Competition	Starting round	Final position/round	First match	Last match
Primeira Liga	—N/a	2nd	12 August 2016	21 May 2017
Taça de Portugal	Third round	Fourth round	15 October 2016	18 November 2016
Taça da Liga	Third round	Third round (4th)	29 November 2016	3 January 2017
UEFA Champions League	Play-off round	Round of 16	17 August 2016	14 March 2017

Statistics by competition
Competition	Pld	W	D	L	GF	GA	GD	Win%
Primeira Liga	34	22	10	2	71	19	+52	64.71
Taça de Portugal	2	1	1	0	3	0	+3	50.00
Taça da Liga	3	0	2	1	1	2	−1	0.00
UEFA Champions League	10	4	3	3	13	7	+6	40.00
Total	49	27	16	6	88	28	+60	55.10

=== Primeira Liga ===
==== League table ====
Pos	Team	Pld	W	D	L	GF	GA	GD	Pts	Qualification or relegation
1	Benfica (C)	34	25	7	2	72	18	+54	82	Qualification for the Champions League group stage
2	Porto	34	22	10	2	71	19	+52	76	Qualification for the Champions League group stage
3	Sporting CP	34	21	7	6	68	36	+32	70	Qualification for the Champions League play-off round
4	Vitória de Guimarães	34	18	8	8	50	39	+11	62	Qualification for the Europa League group stage (Note: Since Benfica won the 2016–17 Taça de Portugal, the spot awarded to the cup winner (Europa League group stage) was passed to the fourth-placed team and the spot originally meant for the fourth-placed team (Europa League third qualifying round) was given to the sixth-placed team.)
5	Braga	34	15	9	10	51	36	+15	54	Qualification for the Europa League third qualifying round

Source: Liga Portugal
Rules for classification: 1) Points; 2) Head-to-head points; 3) Head-to-head goal difference; 4) Head-to-head away goals scored; 5) Goal difference; 6) Matches won; 7) Goals scored; 8) Play-off.
(Note: The LPFP decided that only criteria 1, 5, 6 and 7 would be applied to establish the classification during the competition.)
(C) Champions

==== Results by round ====
Round	1	2	3	4	5	6	7	8	9	10	11	12	13	14	15	16	17	18	19	20	21	22	23	24	25	26	27	28	29	30	31	32	33	34
Ground	A	H	A	H	A	H	A	H	A	H	A	H	A	H	H	A	H	H	A	H	A	H	A	H	A	H	A	H	A	H	A	A	H	A
Result	W	W	L	W	D	W	W	W	D	D	D	W	W	W	W	D	W	W	W	W	W	W	W	W	W	D	D	W	D	D	W	D	W	L
Position	1	1	6	4	3	3	2	2	2	2	4	3	2	2	2	2	2	2	2	2	2	2	2	2	2	2	2	2	2	2	2	2	2	2

A = Away; H = Home; W = Win; D = Draw; L = Loss

==== Matches ====
12 August 2016 1	Rio Ave	1–3	Porto	Vila do Conde
20:30 WEST (UTC+01:00)	Marcelo 36'	Report	Corona 40'; Herrera 52'; Silva 60'	Stadium: Estádio dos Arcos; Attendance: 8,357; Referee: Fábio Veríssimo

20 August 2016 2	Porto	1–0	Estoril	Porto
20:30 WEST (UTC+01:00)	Silva 84'	Report		Stadium: Estádio do Dragão; Attendance: 36,210; Referee: Luís Ferreira

28 August 2016 3	Sporting CP	2–1	Porto	Lisbon
18:00 WEST (UTC+01:00)	Slimani 14'; Martins 26'	Report	Felipe 8'	Stadium: Estádio José Alvalade; Attendance: 49,399; Referee: Tiago Martins

10 September 2016 4	Porto	3–0	Vitória de Guimarães	Porto
20:30 WEST (UTC+01:00)	Marcano 38'; Óliver 46'; Aurélio 55' (o.g.)	Report		Stadium: Estádio do Dragão; Attendance: 40,105; Referee: Jorge Sousa

18 September 2016 5	Tondela	0–0	Porto	Tondela
18:00 WEST (UTC+01:00)		Report		Stadium: Estádio João Cardoso; Attendance: 3,390; Referee: Hugo Miguel

23 September 2016 6	Porto	3–1	Boavista	Porto
19:00 WEST (UTC+01:00)	Silva 19', 41' (pen.); Telles 86'	Report	Henrique 5'	Stadium: Estádio do Dragão; Attendance: 31,210; Referee: Nuno Almeida

1 October 2016 7	Nacional	0–4	Porto	Funchal, Madeira
20:30 WEST (UTC+01:00)		Report	Jota 11', 38', 44'; Silva 58'	Stadium: Estádio da Madeira; Attendance: 4,169; Referee: Rui Costa

22 October 2016 8	Porto	3–0	Arouca	Porto
20:30 WEST (UTC+01:00)	Silva 43', 78'; Brahimi 90+1'	Report		Stadium: Estádio do Dragão; Attendance: 31,310; Referee: Manuel Mota

29 October 2016 9	Vitória de Setúbal	0–0	Porto	Setúbal
18:15 WEST (UTC+01:00)		Report		Stadium: Estádio do Bonfim; Attendance: 7,245; Referee: João Pinheiro

6 November 2016 10	Porto	1–1	Benfica	Porto
18:00 WET (UTC±00:00)	Jota 50'	Report	López 90+2'	Stadium: Estádio do Dragão; Attendance: 50,019; Referee: Artur Soares Dias

26 November 2016 11	Belenenses	0–0	Porto	Lisbon
20:30 WET (UTC±00:00)		Report		Stadium: Estádio do Restelo; Attendance: 6,663; Referee: Manuel Oliveira

3 December 2016 12	Porto	1–0	Braga	Porto
20:30 WET (UTC±00:00)	Rui Pedro 90+5'	Report		Stadium: Estádio do Dragão; Attendance: 31,219; Referee: Carlos Xistra

11 December 2016 13	Feirense	0–4	Porto	Santa Maria da Feira
16:00 WET (UTC±00:00)		Report	Silva 4' (pen.), 66'; Brahimi 33'; Marcano 50'	Stadium: Estádio Marcolino de Castro; Attendance: 4,635; Referee: Luís Ferreira

15 December 2016 (Note: The match was originally to be played on 21 December 2016 but it was brought forward.) 15	Porto	2–1	Marítimo	Porto
20:30 WET (UTC±00:00)	Brahimi 45'; Silva 67'	Report	Djoussé 85'	Stadium: Estádio do Dragão; Attendance: 22,208; Referee: Bruno Esteves

19 December 2016 14	Porto	2–1	Chaves	Porto
20:00 WET (UTC±00:00)	Depoitre 72'; D. Pereira 77'	Report	R. Lopes 12'	Stadium: Estádio do Dragão; Attendance: 35,210; Referee: Vasco Santos

7 January 2017 16	Paços de Ferreira	0–0	Porto	Paços de Ferreira
20:30 WET (UTC±00:00)		Report		Stadium: Estádio Capital do Móvel; Attendance: 5,144; Referee: Artur Soares Dias

15 January 2017 17	Porto	3–0	Moreirense	Porto
18:00 WET (UTC±00:00)	Óliver 30'; Silva 42'; Marcano 62'	Report		Stadium: Estádio do Dragão; Attendance: 32,230; Referee: Fábio Veríssimo

21 January 2017 18	Porto	4–2	Rio Ave	Porto
16:00 WET (UTC±00:00)	Felipe 18'; Marcano 55'; D. Pereira 62'; Rui Pedro 88'	Report	Guedes 35'; Roderick 49' (pen.)	Stadium: Estádio do Dragão; Attendance: 43,328; Referee: Jorge Sousa

28 January 2017 19	Estoril	1–2	Porto	Estoril
18:15 WET (UTC±00:00)	Dankler 90+3'	Report	Silva 83'; Corona 90'	Stadium: Estádio António Coimbra da Mota; Attendance: 5,497; Referee: Manuel Oliveira

4 February 2017 20	Porto	2–1	Sporting CP	Porto
20:30 WET (UTC±00:00)	Soares 6', 40'	Report	A. Ruiz 60'	Stadium: Estádio do Dragão; Attendance: 48,329; Referee: Hugo Miguel

11 February 2017 21	Vitória de Guimarães	0–2	Porto	Guimarães
20:30 WET (UTC±00:00)		Report	Soares 36'; Jota 85'	Stadium: Estádio D. Afonso Henriques; Attendance: 27,212; Referee: Carlos Xistra

17 February 2017 22	Porto	4–0	Tondela	Porto
20:30 WET (UTC±00:00)	Silva 43' (pen.); Neves 54'; Soares 63'; Jota 90+1'	Report		Stadium: Estádio do Dragão; Attendance: 35,210; Referee: Luís Ferreira

26 February 2017 23	Boavista	0–1	Porto	Porto
20:15 WET (UTC±00:00)		Report	Soares 7'	Stadium: Estádio do Bessa; Attendance: 13,549; Referee: Fábio Veríssimo

4 March 2017 24	Porto	7–0	Nacional	Porto
18:15 WET (UTC±00:00)	Óliver 32'; Brahimi 45+1'; Silva 52', 90'; Soares 55', 71'; Layún 64'	Report		Stadium: Estádio do Dragão; Attendance: 39,230; Referee: Bruno Paixão

10 March 2017 25	Arouca	0–4	Porto	Arouca
20:30 WET (UTC±00:00)		Report	D. Pereira 15'; Soares 25', 86'; Jota 72'	Stadium: Estádio Municipal de Arouca; Attendance: 5,000; Referee: Hugo Miguel

19 March 2017 26	Porto	1–1	Vitória de Setúbal	Porto
18:00 WET (UTC±00:00)	Corona 45+1'	Report	Carvalho 56'	Stadium: Estádio do Dragão; Attendance: 49,417; Referee: Manuel Oliveira

2 April 2017 27	Benfica	1–1	Porto	Lisbon
20:30 WEST (UTC+01:00)	Jonas 7' (pen.)	Report	M. Pereira 50'	Stadium: Estádio da Luz; Attendance: 63,323; Referee: Carlos Xistra

9 April 2017 28	Porto	3–0	Belenenses	Porto
18:15 WEST (UTC+01:00)	D. Pereira 37'; Soares 69'; Brahimi 74'	Report		Stadium: Estádio do Dragão; Attendance: 41,322; Referee: Fábio Veríssimo

15 April 2017 29	Braga	1–1	Porto	Braga
20:30 WEST (UTC+01:00)	Santos 6'	Report	Soares 61'	Stadium: Estádio Municipal de Braga; Attendance: 21,106; Referee: Hugo Miguel

23 April 2017 30	Porto	0–0	Feirense	Porto
20:15 WEST (UTC+01:00)		Report		Stadium: Estádio do Dragão; Attendance: 39,229; Referee: Rui Costa

29 April 2017 31	Chaves	0–2	Porto	Chaves
20:30 WEST (UTC+01:00)		Report	Soares 52'; André 72'	Stadium: Estádio Municipal Eng. Manuel Branco Teixeira; Attendance: 6,550; Referee: Carlos Xistra

6 May 2017 32	Marítimo	1–1	Porto	Funchal, Madeira
20:30 WEST (UTC+01:00)	Djoussé 69'	Report	Otávio 28'	Stadium: Estádio do Marítimo; Attendance: 10,454; Referee: Jorge Sousa

14 May 2017 33	Porto	4–1	Paços de Ferreira	Porto
18:00 WEST (UTC+01:00)	Herrera 35'; Brahimi 39'; Jota 47'; Silva 88'	Report	Andrezinho 30'	Stadium: Estádio do Dragão; Attendance: 25,416; Referee: Artur Soares Dias

21 May 2017 34	Moreirense	3–1	Porto	Moreira de Cónegos
18:00 WEST (UTC+01:00)	Boateng 15'; Maciel 36'; Alex 83'	Report	M. Pereira 65'	Stadium: Parque de Jogos Comendador Joaquim de Almeida Freitas; Attendance: 4,925; Referee: Fábio Veríssimo

=== Taça de Portugal ===
==== Third round ====
15 October 2016	Gafanha	0–3	Porto	Aveiro
20:15 WEST (UTC+01:00)			Otávio 32'; Corona 70'; Depoitre 90'	Stadium: Estádio Municipal de Aveiro; Attendance: 8,000; Referee: Jorge Ferreira

==== Fourth round ====
18 November 2016	Chaves	0–0 (a.e.t.) (3–2 p)	Porto	Chaves
20:15 WET (UTC±00:00)				Stadium: Estádio Municipal Eng. Manuel Branco Teixeira; Attendance: 7,900; Referee: João Capela
	Penalties
	Braga (penalty missed); Battaglia (penalty scored); Patrão (penalty scored); Lopes (penalty missed); Freire (penalty scored)		(penalty scored) Evandro; (penalty missed) Layún; (penalty scored) Telles; (penalty missed) Depoitre; (penalty missed) Silva

=== Taça da Liga ===
==== Third round ====
Pos	Team	Pld	W	D	L	GF	GA	GD	Pts	Qualification	MOR	BEL	FEI	POR
1	Moreirense	3	2	1	0	6	4	+2	7	Advance to knockout phase	—	3–3	—	1–0
2	Belenenses	3	0	3	0	5	5	0	3		—	—	2–2	—
3	Feirense	3	0	2	1	4	5	−1	2		1–2	—	—	—
4	Porto	3	0	2	1	1	2	−1	2		—	0–0	1–1	—

Source: LPFP
Rules for classification: Tiebreakers

29 November 2016 1	Porto	0–0	Belenenses	Porto
21:15 WET (UTC±00:00)		Report		Stadium: Estádio do Dragão; Attendance: 14,228; Referee: Nuno Almeida

29 December 2016 2	Porto	1–1	Feirense	Porto
19:15 WET (UTC±00:00)	Marcano 49'	Report	Flávio 73'	Stadium: Estádio do Dragão; Attendance: 41,305; Referee: João Pinheiro

3 January 2017 3	Moreirense	1–0	Porto	Moreira de Cónegos
21:15 WET (UTC±00:00)	Geraldes 49'	Report		Stadium: Parque de Jogos Comendador Joaquim de Almeida Freitas; Attendance: 2,534; Referee: Luís Godinho

=== UEFA Champions League ===
==== Play-off round ====
17 August 2016 1st leg	Porto (Portugal)	1–1	(Italy) Roma	Porto, Portugal
20:45 CEST (UTC+02:00)	Silva 61' (pen.)	Report	Felipe 21' (o.g.)	Stadium: Estádio do Dragão; Attendance: 46,310; Referee: Björn Kuipers (Netherlands)

23 August 2016 2nd leg	Roma (Italy)	0–3 (1–4 agg.)	(Portugal) Porto	Rome, Italy
20:45 CEST (UTC+02:00)		Report	Felipe 8'; Layún 73'; Corona 75'	Stadium: Stadio Olimpico; Attendance: 39,866; Referee: Szymon Marciniak (Poland)

==== Group stage ====
Pos	Team	Pld	W	D	L	GF	GA	GD	Pts	Qualification	LEI	POR	CPH	BRU
1	(England) Leicester City	6	4	1	1	7	6	+1	13	Advance to knockout phase	—	1–0	1–0	2–1
2	(Portugal) Porto	6	3	2	1	9	3	+6	11	Advance to knockout phase	5–0	—	1–1	1–0
3	(Denmark) Copenhagen	6	2	3	1	7	2	+5	9	Transfer to Europa League	0–0	0–0	—	4–0
4	(Belgium) Club Brugge	6	0	0	6	2	14	−12	0		0–3	1–2	0–2	—

Source: UEFA
Rules for classification: Group stage tiebreakers

14 September 2016 1	Porto (Portugal)	1–1	(Denmark) Copenhagen	Porto, Portugal
20:45 CEST (UTC+02:00)	Otávio 13'	Report	Cornelius 52'	Stadium: Estádio do Dragão; Attendance: 34,325; Referee: Matej Jug (Slovenia)

27 September 2016 2	Leicester City (England)	1–0	(Portugal) Porto	Leicester, England
20:45 CEST (UTC+02:00)	Slimani 25'	Report		Stadium: King Power Stadium; Attendance: 31,805; Referee: Cüneyt Çakır (Turkey)

18 October 2016 3	Club Brugge (Belgium)	1–2	(Portugal) Porto	Bruges, Belgium
20:45 CEST (UTC+02:00)	Vossen 12'	Report	Layún 68'; Silva 90+3' (pen.)	Stadium: Jan Breydel Stadium; Attendance: 23,325; Referee: Paolo Tagliavento (Italy)

3 November 2016 4	Porto (Portugal)	1–0	(Belgium) Club Brugge	Porto, Portugal
20:45 CET (UTC+01:00)	Silva 37'	Report		Stadium: Estádio do Dragão; Attendance: 32,310; Referee: Alberto Undiano Mallenco (Spain)

22 November 2016 5	Copenhagen (Denmark)	0–0	(Portugal) Porto	Copenhagen, Denmark
20:45 CET (UTC+01:00)		Report		Stadium: Parken Stadium; Attendance: 32,036; Referee: Milorad Mažić (Serbia)

7 December 2016 6	Porto (Portugal)	5–0	(England) Leicester City	Porto, Portugal
20:45 CET (UTC+01:00)	Silva 6', 64' (pen.); Corona 26'; Brahimi 44'; Jota 77'	Report		Stadium: Estádio do Dragão; Attendance: 39,310; Referee: Felix Zwayer (Germany)

==== Round of 16 ====
22 February 2017 1st leg	Porto (Portugal)	0–2	(Italy) Juventus	Porto, Portugal
20:45 CET (UTC+01:00)		Report	Pjaca 72'; Alves 74'	Stadium: Estádio do Dragão; Attendance: 49,229; Referee: Felix Brych

14 March 2017 2nd leg	Juventus (Italy)	1–0 (3–0 agg.)	(Portugal) Porto	Turin, Italy
20:45 CET (UTC+01:00)	Dybala 42' (pen.)	Report		Stadium: Juventus Stadium; Attendance: 41,161; Referee: Ovidiu Haţegan

== Statistics ==
=== Appearances and discipline ===
No.	Pos.	Nat.	Player	Primeira Liga				Taça de Portugal				Taça da Liga				Champions League				Total			
No.	Pos.	Nat.	Player	Apps	Yellow card	Second yellow card	Red card	Apps	Yellow card	Second yellow card	Red card	Apps	Yellow card	Second yellow card	Red card	Apps	Yellow card	Second yellow card	Red card	Apps	Yellow card	Second yellow card	Red card
1	GK	(Spain)	Iker Casillas	33 (0)	2	0	0	0 (0)	0	0	0	0 (0)	0	0	0	10 (0)	0	0	0	43 (0)	2	0	0
2	DF	(Uruguay)	Maxi Pereira	23 (1)	8	1	1	2 (0)	1	0	0	2 (0)	2	0	0	7 (0)	2	0	1	34 (1)	13	1	2
3	MF	(Portugal)	Sérgio Oliveira	1 (1)	0	0	0	0 (0)	0	0	0	0 (0)	0	0	0	1 (1)	1	0	0	2 (2)	1	0	0
4	DF	(France)	Willy Boly	4 (0)	0	0	0	1 (0)	0	0	0	2 (0)	1	0	0	1 (1)	0	0	0	8 (1)	1	0	0
5	DF	(Spain)	Iván Marcano	32 (0)	5	0	0	2 (0)	1	0	0	2 (0)	0	0	0	10 (0)	2	0	0	46 (0)	8	0	0
6	MF	(Portugal)	Rúben Neves	13 (7)	4	0	0	0 (0)	0	0	0	2 (0)	1	0	0	3 (2)	0	0	0	18 (9)	5	0	0
7	FW	(Portugal)	Silvestre Varela	4 (3)	0	0	0	1 (0)	0	0	0	1 (0)	0	0	0	1 (1)	0	0	0	7 (4)	0	0	0
8	MF	(Algeria)	Yacine Brahimi	22 (6)	2	0	1	1 (1)	0	0	0	3 (0)	3	1	0	5 (2)	0	0	0	31 (9)	5	1	1
9	FW	(Belgium)	Laurent Depoitre	7 (5)	0	0	0	2 (2)	0	0	0	3 (0)	0	0	0	1 (1)	0	0	0	13 (8)	0	0	0
10	FW	(Portugal)	André Silva	32 (4)	3	0	0	2 (0)	0	0	0	0 (0)	0	0	0	10 (0)	3	0	0	44 (4)	6	0	0
11	FW	(Spain)	Adrián López	5 (4)	0	0	0	0 (0)	0	0	0	1 (1)	0	0	0	3 (1)	0	0	0	9 (6)	0	0	0
12	GK	(Portugal)	José Sá	1 (0)	2	0	0	2 (0)	0	0	0	3 (0)	0	0	0	0 (0)	0	0	0	6 (0)	2	0	0
13	DF	(Brazil)	Alex Telles	32 (0)	6	1	0	2 (0)	0	0	0	2 (0)	1	0	0	9 (0)	2	1	0	45 (0)	9	2	0
15	MF	(Brazil)	Evandro	0 (0)	0	0	0	1 (1)	1	0	0	1 (0)	0	0	0	2 (2)	0	0	0	4 (3)	1	0	0
16	MF	(Mexico)	Héctor Herrera	23 (9)	1	0	0	1 (0)	1	0	0	3 (0)	0	0	0	8 (2)	3	0	0	35 (11)	5	0	0
17	FW	(Mexico)	Jesús Corona	29 (9)	4	0	0	1 (1)	0	0	0	2 (1)	0	0	0	9 (5)	1	0	0	41 (16)	5	0	0
18	MF	(Portugal)	João Carlos Teixeira	8 (8)	0	0	0	0 (0)	0	0	0	2 (1)	0	0	0	0 (0)	0	0	0	10 (9)	0	0	0
19	FW	(Portugal)	Diogo Jota	27 (12)	3	0	0	2 (0)	0	0	0	1 (1)	0	0	0	8 (4)	1	0	0	38 (17)	4	0	0
20	MF	(Portugal)	André André	25 (6)	7	0	0	1 (0)	1	0	0	2 (0)	0	0	0	5 (1)	2	0	0	33 (7)	10	0	0
21	DF	(Mexico)	Miguel Layún	16 (4)	3	0	0	1 (1)	0	0	0	0 (0)	0	0	0	8 (4)	2	0	0	25 (9)	5	0	0
22	MF	(Portugal)	Danilo Pereira	28 (1)	4	0	0	2 (0)	0	0	0	1 (0)	2	1	0	10 (0)	1	0	0	41 (1)	7	1	0
23	FW	(Brazil)	Kelvin	1 (1)	0	0	0	0 (0)	0	0	0	0 (0)	0	0	0	0 (0)	0	0	0	1 (1)	0	0	0
24	GK	(Portugal)	João Costa	0 (0)	0	0	0	0 (0)	0	0	0	0 (0)	0	0	0	0 (0)	0	0	0	0 (0)	0	0	0
25	MF	(Brazil)	Otávio	23 (7)	3	0	0	2 (0)	0	0	0	0 (0)	0	0	0	8 (1)	1	0	0	33 (8)	4	0	0
28	DF	(Brazil)	Felipe	32 (0)	9	0	0	1 (0)	0	0	0	2 (0)	1	0	0	10 (0)	2	0	0	45 (0)	12	0	0
29	FW	(Brazil)	Soares	15 (0)	1	0	0	0 (0)	0	0	0	0 (0)	0	0	0	2 (0)	0	0	0	17 (0)	1	0	0
30	MF	(Spain)	Óliver Torres	29 (5)	1	0	0	1 (0)	0	0	0	2 (1)	0	0	0	7 (0)	0	0	0	39 (6)	1	0	0
45	DF	(Brazil)	Inácio	0 (0)	0	0	0	0 (0)	0	0	0	1 (0)	0	0	0	0 (0)	0	0	0	1 (0)	0	0	0
59	FW	(Portugal)	Rui Pedro	9 (9)	1	0	0	0 (0)	0	0	0	3 (3)	0	0	0	1 (1)	0	0	0	13 (13)	1	0	0
Total					69	2	2		5	0	0		7	2	0		23	1	1		105	5	3

=== Goalscorers ===
Rank	No.	Pos.	Nat.	Player	Primeira Liga	Taça de Portugal	Taça da Liga	Champions League	Total
1	10	FW	(Portugal)	André Silva	16	0	0	5	21
2	29	FW	(Brazil)	Soares	12	0	0	0	12
3	19	FW	(Portugal)	Diogo Jota	8	0	0	1	9
4	8	MF	(Algeria)	Yacine Brahimi	6	0	0	1	7
5	17	FW	(Mexico)	Jesús Corona	3	1	0	2	6
6	5	DF	(Spain)	Iván Marcano	4	0	1	0	5
7	22	MF	(Portugal)	Danilo Pereira	4	0	0	0	4
8	28	DF	(Brazil)	Felipe	2	0	0	1	3
8	21	DF	(Mexico)	Miguel Layún	1	0	0	2	3
8	30	MF	(Spain)	Óliver Torres	3	0	0	0	3
8	25	MF	(Brazil)	Otávio	1	1	0	1	3
12	9	FW	(Belgium)	Laurent Depoitre	1	1	0	0	2
12	16	MF	(Mexico)	Héctor Herrera	2	0	0	0	2
12	59	FW	(Portugal)	Rui Pedro	2	0	0	0	2
12	2	DF	(Uruguay)	Maxi Pereira	2	0	0	0	2
16	20	MF	(Portugal)	André André	1	0	0	0	1
16	6	MF	(Portugal)	Rúben Neves	1	0	0	0	1
16	13	DF	(Brazil)	Alex Telles	1	0	0	0	1
Total					70	3	1	13	87
