= Juan Felipe Moreno =

Colombian footballer (born 2002)

Personal information
- Full name: Juan Felipe Gómez Moreno
- Date of birth: 21 September 2002 (age 24)
- Place of birth: Puerto Tejada, Cauca, Colombia
- Height: 1.88 m (6 ft 2 in)
- Position: Forward

Youth career
- –2020: Puerto Pro FC
- 2020–2023: Midtjylland

Senior career*
Years	Team	Apps	(Gls)
2023–2025	Mafra	9	(0)
2024	→ 1º Dezembro (loan)	8	(1)
- * Club domestic league appearances and goals as of 12 November 2024 (UTC)

Juan Felipe Gómez Moreno (born 21 September 2002) is a Colombian footballer who plays as a forward.

== Career ==
=== Club career ===
In October 2020, Danish club FC Midtjylland confirmed that they had signed 18-year-old Moreno from Puerto Pro FC. Moreno was included in the club's U-19 team. In the 2020–21 and 2021–22 seasons, Moreno played for the club's U-19 team. In the following 2022–23 season, Moreno sat out most of the season due to injury and rehabilitation.

On July 18, 2023, Moreno, along with two teammates from Midtjylland, joined Liga Portugal 2 club C.D. Mafra. Moreno made his debut on August 26, 2023, against Os Belenenses when he replaced Mesaque Djú in the 86th minute.

After playing just 235 minutes for Mafra, it was confirmed on January 31, 2024, that Moreno had been loaned out to Liga 3 side 1º Dezembro until the end of the season.
