= David Petriashvili Stadium =

Stadium in Tbilisi, Georgia

Coordinates: 41°47′30″N 44°46′46″E

- Interactive map of David Petriashvili Stadium
- Former names: Athletics Stadium (2015-2017)
- Address: Tbilisi; Georgia
- Capacity: 2130

Construction
- Opened: July 1, 2015

The David Petriashvili Stadium is a sports venue in Tbilisi, Georgia. The stadium is currently used by 2 teams: FC Gagra and FC Rustavi, mainly for Erovnuli Liga matches. The stadium has a capacity of 2130 seats.

== History ==
The stadium was constructed in 2015 as an athletic and sports ground to host events for the 2015 European Youth Summer Festival. The stadium also hosted some matches in the 2017 UEFA European Under-19 Championship: Czechia 1-2 Portugal, Germany 1-4 Netherlands, England 4-1 Germany and the stadium is the most famous for hosting the semi-final between Portugal and Netherlands where Portugal won 1–0. The stadium also hosted all the matches in the 2019 Amputee Champions League. It hosted the 2027 FIFA Women's World Cup UEFA play-offs match between Belarus and Italy, Belarus were supposed to host a home match but due to Russia's invasion of Ukraine and Belarusian Involvement, the David Petriashvili stadium was chosen to host the match. The match was also closed behind doors. The stadium hosts some of Georgia's youth teams matches (Under-21, Under-19, Under-17). It also hosted the 2024 Georgian Super Cup final and semi-final.

== Name ==
The stadium was renamed in 2017 after David Petriashvili, who tragically passed away in 2015. David Petriashvili joined UEFA in 2011, and became a senior project manager in 2013. Old name of the stadium was Athletics Stadium.
