= Giorgi Chochishvili =

Georgian footballer

Personal information
- Date of birth: 7 May 1998 (age 28)
- Place of birth: Tbilisi, Georgia
- Height: 1.95 m (6 ft 5 in)
- Position: Goalkeeper

Team information
- Current team: Merani Tbilisi
- Number: 16

Youth career
- –2014: Saburtalo Tbilisi

Senior career*
Years	Team	Apps	(Gls)
2013–2017	Saburtalo Tbilisi	1	(0)
2017	→ Shevardeni Tbilisi (loan)		
2017–2018	Slavia Prague	0	(0)
2018	→ ViOn Zlaté Moravce (loan)	1	(0)
2018	Sioni Bolnisi	2	(0)
2019	Shevardeni Tbilisi	15	(0)
2019–2020	Dila Gori	16	(0)
2021	Telavi	12	(0)
2021–	Merani Tbilisi	3	(0)

International career^{‡}
2014–2015	Georgia U17	3	(0)
2015–2017	Georgia U19	5	(0)
2018–	Georgia U21	1	(0)
- * Club domestic league appearances and goals as of 28 September 2021 ‡ National team caps and goals as of 23 January 2018

Giorgi Chochishvili (Georgian: გიორგი ჩოჩიშვილი; born 7 May 1998) is a Georgian football player. He plays for Merani Tbilisi.

== Club career ==
He made his fully professional debut in the Fortuna Liga for ViOn Zlaté Moravce on 5 May 2018 in a game against Senica, as a starter.

== International ==
He was the starting goalkeeper for the Georgia U19 team that participated in the 2017 UEFA European Under-19 Championship as hosts. Georgia did not advance from the group stage.
