= Inácio (footballer, born 1996) =

Brazilian footballer

Personal information
- Full name: Inácio Carneiro dos Santos
- Date of birth: 29 January 1996 (age 30)
- Place of birth: Conceição do Coité, Brazil
- Height: 1.79 m (5 ft 10 in)
- Position: Left-back

Team information
- Current team: Inhumas

Youth career
- 2013: Bahia
- 2014–2016: São Paulo

Senior career*
Years	Team	Apps	(Gls)
2016–2021	Porto B	31	(1)
2017–2018	→ Portimonense (loan)	1	(0)
2019	→ Guarani (loan)	5	(0)
2019–2020	→ Penafiel (loan)	11	(2)
2023	Vitória da Conquista	9	(0)
2024	EC São Bernardo	11	(0)
2025–	Inhumas	5	(0)
- * Club domestic league appearances and goals as of 1 February 2025

Inácio Carneiro dos Santos (born 29 January 1996), known as Inácio, is a Brazilian footballer who plays as a left-back for Inhumas.

== Career ==
Inácio made his professional debut in the Segunda Liga for Porto B on 21 September 2016 in a game against Sporting Covilhã.

He made his debut for the main squad of Porto on 29 November 2016 in a 2016–17 Taça da Liga game against Belenenses.

On 8 January 2019, Guarani FC announced that they had signed Inácio on a season-long loan deal.
