= Alija Krnić =

Montenegrin footballer (born 1998)

Personal information
- Full name: Alija Krnić
- Date of birth: 2 January 1998 (age 28)
- Place of birth: Podgorica, FR Yugoslavia
- Height: 1.75 m (5 ft 9 in)
- Position: Left winger

Team information
- Current team: OFK Petrovac

Youth career
- –2015: Budućnost Podgorica

Senior career*
Years	Team	Apps	(Gls)
2015–2016	Dečić	24	(1)
2016–2017	Almudévar	17	(3)
2017–2020	Javor Ivanjica	49	(6)
2020–2021	Iskra Danilovgrad	12	(1)
2021	Javor Ivanjica	6	(0)
2021–2022	Kukësi	15	(0)
2022–2024	FK Jedinstvo	60	(7)
2024–2025	Jezero	22	(1)
2025–	OFK Petrovac	5	(0)

International career
2015–2016	Montenegro U19	11	(2)
2019	Montenegro U21	5	(0)
- * Club domestic league appearances and goals as of 24 October 2025

Alija Krnić (Montenegrin: Алија Крнић, Albanian: Ali Kërnaj; born 2 January 1998) is a Montenegrin footballer who plays as a left winger for OFK Petrovac in Montenegro.

== Club career ==
=== Early career ===
Born in Podgorica, he played with FK Dečić in the 2015–16 Montenegrin First League. Then he moved to Spain, and played one season with AD Almudévar playing in the 2016–17 Tercera División. In summer 2017 he joined Serbian top-level side FK Javor Ivanjica.

=== Kukësi ===
On 25 June 2021, Krnić signed a two-year contract with Kategoria Superiore club Kukësi.
