= Theodoros Mingos =

Greek footballer

Personal information
- Date of birth: 6 February 1998 (age 28)
- Place of birth: Athens, Greece
- Height: 1.81 m (5 ft 11 in)
- Position: Midfielder

Youth career
- 2008–2016: Panathinaikos

Senior career*
Years	Team	Apps	(Gls)
2016–2018	Panathinaikos	1	(0)
2017–2018	→ Kallithea (loan)	26	(0)
2018–2019	Olympiakos Nicosia	13	(0)
2019–2021	OFI	3	(0)
2021–2022	Rodos	23	(0)
2022–2023	Thesprotos	21	(2)
2023–2024	Pierikos		
2024	Kukësi	11	(0)

International career
2014–2015	Greece U17	13	(0)
2016–2017	Greece U19	12	(3)
2018	Greece U20	2	(1)
2017	Greece U21	1	(0)
- * Club domestic league appearances and goals as of 1 June 2024

Theodoros Mingos (Greek: Θεόδωρος Μίγγος, Albanian: Thodhori Mingo; born 6 February 1998) is a Greek professional footballer who plays as a central midfielder.

== Career ==
He plays mainly as a central midfielder, and joined Panathinaikos from the youth ranks of Panathinaikos in the summer of 2016. He signed a 4-year contract that keeps him in Panathinaikos until 30 June 2020.

On 3 July 2019, he joined OFI on a three-year deal.
