= Robin Zwartjens =

Dutch footballer

Personal information
- Date of birth: 17 March 1998 (age 28)
- Place of birth: Delft, Netherlands
- Height: 1.85 m (6 ft 1 in)
- Position: Centre back

Team information
- Current team: Jong ADO Den Haag

Youth career
- SV Wippolder
- Sparta Rotterdam
- –2015: DHC Delft
- 2015–2017: Feyenoord

Senior career*
| Years | Team | Apps | (Gls) |
| 2017–2020 | Jong FC Utrecht | 34 | (1) |
| 2020– | Jong ADO Den Haag | | |

International career
| 2017 | Netherlands U19 | 2 | (0) |
- * Club domestic league appearances and goals as of 17 May 2018

Robin Zwartjens (born 17 March 1998) is a Dutch football player. He plays for the Jong-team of ADO Den Haag.

== Club career ==
He made his Eerste Divisie debut for Jong FC Utrecht on 21 August 2017 in a game against FC Oss. On 11 January 2020, Zwartjens moved to ADO Den Haag to play for the club's Jong-team.
