= 2017 UEFA European Under-19 Championship =

2017 უეფას 19-წლამდელთა ევროპის ჩემპიონატი

Tournament details
- Host country: Georgia
- Dates: 2–15 July
- Teams: 8 (from 1 confederation)
- Venues: 4 (in 2 host cities)

Final positions
- Champions: England (10th title)
- Runners-up: Portugal

Tournament statistics
- Matches played: 15
- Goals scored: 39 (2.6 per match)
- Attendance: 53,707 (3,580 per match)
- Top scorer(s): (England) Ben Brereton (England) Ryan Sessegnon (Netherlands) Joël Piroe (Sweden) Viktor Gyökeres (3 goals each)
- Best player: (England) Mason Mount

The 2017 UEFA European Under-19 Championship (also known as UEFA Under-19 Euro 2017) was the 16th edition of the UEFA European Under-19 Championship (66th edition if the Under-18 and Junior eras are included), the annual international youth football championship organised by UEFA for the men's under-19 national teams of Europe. Georgia, which were selected by UEFA on 26 January 2015, hosted the tournament.

A total of eight teams played in the tournament, with players born on or after 1 January 1998 eligible to participate.

In the final, which was played on 15 July, England defeated Portugal 2–1.

== Qualification ==
All 54 UEFA nations entered the competition, and with the hosts Georgia qualifying automatically, the other 53 teams competed in the qualifying competition to determine the remaining seven spots in the final tournament. The qualifying competition consisted of two rounds: Qualifying round, which took place in autumn 2016, and Elite round, which took place in spring 2017.

=== Qualified teams ===
The following eight teams qualified for the final tournament.

Note: All appearance statistics include only U-19 era (since 2002).

Team	Method of qualification	Finals appearance	Last appearance	Previous best performance
Georgia	Hosts	2nd	2013	Group stage (2013)
Netherlands	Elite round Group 1 winners	5th	2016	Group stage (2010, 2013, 2015, 2016)
Germany	Elite round Group 2 winners	9th	2016	Champions (2008, 2014)
England	Elite round Group 3 winners	9th	2016	Runners-up (2005, 2009)
Portugal	Elite round Group 4 winners	9th	2016	Runners-up (2003, 2014)
Bulgaria	Elite round Group 5 winners	3rd	2014	Group stage (2008, 2014)
Czech Republic	Elite round Group 6 winners	6th	2011	Runners-up (2011)
Sweden	Elite round Group 7 winners	1st	–	Debut

=== Final draw ===
The final draw was held in 13 April 2017, 14:00 GET (UTC+4), at the Ballroom of Hotels & Preference Hualing in Tbilisi, Georgia. The eight teams were drawn into two groups of four teams. There was no seeding, except that hosts Georgia were assigned to position A1 in the draw.

== Venues ==
Map of the final tournament venues

The final tournament matches were held in four stadium venues located in two cities:

Stadium	Location	Capacity
Mikheil Meskhi Stadium	Tbilisi	27,000
Mikheil Meskhi Stadium-2	Tbilisi	2,000
David Petriashvili Stadium	Tbilisi	3,000
Tengiz Burjanadze Stadium	Gori	5,000

== Match officials ==
A total of 6 referees, 8 assistant referees and 2 fourth officials were appointed for the final tournament.

Referees

- (Denmark) Mads-Kristoffer Kristoffersen
- (Italy) Davide Massa
- (Norway) Ole Hobber Nilsen
- (Russia) Sergey Lapochkin
- (Serbia) Srđan Jovanović
- (Turkey) Ali Palabıyık

Assistant referees

- (Albania) Denis Rexha
- (Belarus) Yury Khomchanka
- (Belgium) Thibaud Nijssen
- (Estonia) Silver Koiv
- (Hungary) Balázs Buzás
- (Luxembourg) Daniel Da Costa
- (Scotland) Graeme Stewart
- (Ukraine) Igor Alokhin

Fourth officials

- (Georgia (country)) Giorgi Kruashvili
- (Georgia (country)) George Vadachkoria

Volunteer

- (Georgia (country)) Lazare Erkomaishvili

== Squads ==
Each national team had to submit a squad of 18 players.

== Group stage ==
The final tournament schedule was confirmed on 24 April 2017.

The group winners and runners-up advanced to the semi-finals.

Tiebreakers

The teams were ranked according to points (3 points for a win, 1 point for a draw, 0 points for a loss). If two or more teams were equal on points on completion of the group matches, the following tie-breaking criteria were applied, in the order given, to determine the rankings (Regulations Articles 17.01 and 17.02):

1. Higher number of points obtained in the group matches played among the teams in question;
2. Superior goal difference resulting from the group matches played among the teams in question;
3. Higher number of goals scored in the group matches played among the teams in question;
4. If, after having applied criteria 1 to 3, teams still had an equal ranking, criteria 1 to 3 were reapplied exclusively to the group matches between the teams in question to determine their final rankings. If this procedure did not lead to a decision, criteria 5 to 9 applied;
5. Superior goal difference in all group matches;
6. Higher number of goals scored in all group matches;
7. If only two teams had the same number of points, and they were tied according to criteria 1 to 6 after having met in the last round of the group stage, their rankings were determined by a penalty shoot-out (not used if more than two teams had the same number of points, or if their rankings were not relevant for qualification for the next stage).
8. Lower disciplinary points total based only on yellow and red cards received in the group matches (red card = 3 points, yellow card = 1 point, expulsion for two yellow cards in one match = 3 points);
9. Higher position in the coefficient ranking list used for the qualifying round draw;
10. Drawing of lots.

All times are local, GET (UTC+4).

=== Group A ===
Pos	Team	Pld	W	D	L	GF	GA	GD	Pts	Qualification
1	Portugal	3	2	1	0	5	3	+2	7	Knockout stage
2	Czech Republic	3	2	0	1	5	3	+2	6	Knockout stage
3	Georgia (H)	3	1	0	2	2	4	−2	3	
4	Sweden	3	0	1	2	4	6	−2	1	

Source: UEFA
Rules for classification: Group stage tiebreakers
(H) Hosts
2 July 2017
17:30

Sweden	1–2	Czech Republic
Gyökeres 77'	Report	Turyna 42', 55'

Mikheil Meskhi Stadium, Tbilisi
Attendance: 214
Referee: Sergey Lapochkin (Russia)
2 July 2017
20:00

Georgia	0–1	Portugal
	Report	Rui Pedro 66' (pen.)

Tengiz Burjanadze Stadium, Gori
Attendance: 4,156
Referee: Davide Massa (Italy)

5 July 2017
17:30

Georgia	2–1	Sweden
Kokhreidze 3'; Chakvetadze 31'	Report	Gyökeres 47'

Mikheil Meskhi Stadium, Tbilisi
Attendance: 8,300
Referee: Srđan Jovanović (Serbia)
5 July 2017
20:00

Czech Republic	1–2	Portugal
Graiciar 40'	Report	Djú 35'; Rui Pedro 74'

David Petriashvili Stadium, Tbilisi
Attendance: 743
Referee: Ali Palabıyık (Turkey)

8 July 2017
20:00

Czech Republic	2–0	Georgia
Šašinka 45+1'; Holík 70'	Report

Mikheil Meskhi Stadium, Tbilisi
Attendance: 25,154
Referee: Mads-Kristoffer Kristoffersen (Denmark)
8 July 2017
20:00

Portugal	2–2	Sweden
Leão 70'; João Filipe 87' (pen.)	Report	Gyökeres 43'; Karlsson 61'

Tengiz Burjanadze Stadium, Gori
Attendance: 1,753
Referee: Ola Hobber Nilsen (Norway)

=== Group B ===
Pos	Team	Pld	W	D	L	GF	GA	GD	Pts	Qualification
1	England	3	3	0	0	7	1	+6	9	Knockout stage
2	Netherlands	3	1	1	1	5	3	+2	4	Knockout stage
3	Germany	3	1	0	2	5	8	−3	3	
4	Bulgaria	3	0	1	2	1	6	−5	1	

Source: UEFA
Rules for classification: Group stage tiebreakers
3 July 2017
17:30

Bulgaria	0–2	England
	Report	Mount 1'; Sessegnon 48'

Mikheil Meskhi Stadium-2, Tbilisi
Attendance: 220
Referee: Ola Hobber Nilsen (Norway)
3 July 2017
20:00

Germany	1–4	Netherlands
Barkok 46'	Report	Piroe 49', 65', 79'; Grot 90+1'

David Petriashvili Stadium, Tbilisi
Attendance: 1,245
Referee: Mads-Kristoffer Kristoffersen (Denmark)

6 July 2017
17:30

England	1–0	Netherlands
Brereton 84'	Report

Mikheil Meskhi Stadium, Tbilisi
Attendance: 355
Referee: Davide Massa (Italy)
6 July 2017
20:00

Germany	3–0	Bulgaria
Amenyido 10'; Gül 19' (pen.); Friede 54' (pen.)	Report

Tengiz Burjanadze Stadium, Gori
Attendance: 3,252
Referee: Sergey Lapochkin (Russia)

9 July 2017
20:00

England	4–1	Germany
Brereton 52' (pen.), 64'; Sessegnon 80', 84'	Report	Warschewski 76'

David Petriashvili Stadium, Tbilisi
Attendance: 1,887
Referee: Ali Palabıyık (Turkey)
9 July 2017
20:00

Netherlands	1–1	Bulgaria
Kongolo 50'	Report	Rusev 55'

Tengiz Burjanadze Stadium, Gori
Attendance: 1,214
Referee: Srđan Jovanović (Serbia)

== Knockout stage ==
In the knockout stage, extra time and a penalty shoot-out were used to decide the winner if necessary.

On 2 May 2016, the UEFA Executive Committee agreed that the competition would be part of the International Football Association Board (IFAB)'s trial to allow a fourth substitute to be made during extra time. On 1 June 2017, it was also announced as part of a trial sanctioned by the IFAB to reduce the advantage of the team shooting first in a penalty shoot-out, a different sequence of taking penalties, known as "ABBA", that mirrors the serving sequence in a tennis tiebreak would be used if a penalty shoot-out was needed (team A kicks first, team B kicks second):

Original sequence
AB AB AB AB AB (sudden death starts) AB AB etc.
Trial sequence
AB BA AB BA AB (sudden death starts) BA AB etc.

=== Bracket ===
Semi-finals
12 July – Tbilisi
Portugal	1
Netherlands	0
12 July – Tbilisi
England	1
Czech Republic	0

Final
15 July – Gori
Portugal	1
England	2

=== Semi-finals ===
12 July 2017
17:00

Portugal	1–0	Netherlands
Fernandes 24'	Report

David Petriashvili Stadium, Tbilisi
Attendance: 352
Referee: Mads-Kristoffer Kristoffersen (Denmark)

12 July 2017
20:00

England	1–0	Czech Republic
Nmecha 90+3'	Report

Mikheil Meskhi Stadium, Tbilisi
Attendance: 762
Referee: Davide Massa (Italy)

=== Final ===
15 July 2017
20:00

Portugal	1–2	England
Sterling 56' (o.g.)	Report	Suliman 50'; Nmecha 68'

Tengiz Burjanadze Stadium, Gori
Attendance: 4,100
Referee: Srđan Jovanović (Serbia)

== Goalscorers ==
3 goals

- (England) Ben Brereton
- (England) Ryan Sessegnon
- (Netherlands) Joël Piroe
- (Sweden) Viktor Gyökeres

2 goals

- (Czech Republic) Daniel Turyna
- (England) Lukas Nmecha
- (Portugal) Rui Pedro

1 goal

- (Bulgaria) Georgi Rusev
- (Czech Republic) Martin Graiciar
- (Czech Republic) Libor Holík
- (Czech Republic) Ondřej Šašinka
- (England) Mason Mount
- (England) Easah Suliman
- (Georgia (country)) Giorgi Chakvetadze
- (Georgia (country)) Giorgi Kokhreidze
- (Germany) Etienne Amenyido
- (Germany) Aymen Barkok
- (Germany) Sidney Friede
- (Germany) Gökhan Gül
- (Germany) Tobias Warschewski
- (Netherlands) Jay-Roy Grot
- (Netherlands) Rodney Kongolo
- (Portugal) Mesaque Djú
- (Portugal) Gedson Fernandes
- (Portugal) João Filipe
- (Portugal) Rafael Leão
- (Sweden) Jesper Karlsson

1 own goal

- (England) Dujon Sterling (playing against Portugal)

Source: UEFA.com

== Team of the Tournament ==
Goalkeepers

- (Netherlands) Justin Bijlow
- (Portugal) Diogo Costa

Defenders

- (Czech Republic) Alex Král
- (England) Dujon Sterling
- (Portugal) Abdu Conté
- (Portugal) Diogo Dalot
- (Portugal) Diogo Queirós

Midfielders

- (Czech Republic) Ondřej Šašinka
- (England) Tayo Edun
- (England) Mason Mount
- (Georgia (country)) Giorgi Kutsia
- (Portugal) Rui Pires

Forwards

- (England) Ryan Sessegnon
- (Georgia (country)) Giorgi Chakvetadze
- (Netherlands) Javairô Dilrosun
- (Portugal) Mesaque Djú
- (Portugal) Rui Pedro
- (Sweden) Viktor Gyökeres

Source: UEFA Technical Report
