= Rui Pedro (footballer, born 1998) =

Portuguese footballer

Personal information
- Full name: Rui Pedro da Silva e Sousa
- Date of birth: 20 March 1998 (age 28)
- Place of birth: Castelo de Paiva, Portugal
- Height: 1.82 m (6 ft 0 in)
- Positions: Forward; winger

Youth career
- 2009–2012: Sporting Paivense
- 2012–2017: Porto
- 2013–2014: → Padroense (loan)

Senior career*
Years	Team	Apps	(Gls)
2015–2018	Porto B	23	(5)
2016–2020	Porto	9	(2)
2017–2018	→ Boavista (loan)	19	(1)
2019	→ Varzim (loan)	13	(1)
2019–2020	→ Granada B (loan)	14	(2)
2020	→ Leixões (loan)	2	(0)
2020–2021	Leixões	13	(1)
2021–2022	Penafiel	40	(4)
2022–2024	Olimpija Ljubljana	46	(16)
2024–2025	Hatayspor	38	(4)

International career
2013	Portugal U15	2	(1)
2013–2014	Portugal U16	15	(3)
2014–2015	Portugal U17	11	(4)
2015–2016	Portugal U18	5	(3)
2016–2017	Portugal U19	11	(5)
2017	Portugal U20	2	(0)
Medal record
Men's football
Representing Portugal
UEFA European Under-19 Championship
Runner-up	2017
- * Club domestic league appearances and goals as of 31 October 2025

Rui Pedro da Silva e Sousa (born 20 March 1998), known as Rui Pedro, is a Portuguese professional footballer who plays as a forward or winger.

== Club career ==
Born in Castelo de Paiva, Aveiro District, Rui Pedro joined Porto's youth system in 2012, aged 14. On 24 January 2015, at the age of 16, he made his professional debut with their B team, coming on as a late substitute in a 1–0 away loss against Oliveirense in the Segunda Liga.

On 3 December 2016, whilst still a junior, Rui Pedro first appeared in the Primeira Liga with the main squad; after replacing Óliver Torres 15 minutes from the end of the home fixture against Braga, he scored the only goal in injury time, ending the club's negative run of 520 minutes without finding the net. Four days later, also from the bench, he played his first match in the UEFA Champions League, as the hosts defeated already qualified Leicester City 5–0 to also reach the knockout stage; late in the year, UEFA.com selected him as their "weekly wonderkid".

Rui Pedro went on to serve four loans during his spell at the Estádio do Dragão, starting out at Boavista (top division), then moving to Varzim (second tier), Granada B (Spanish Segunda División B) and Leixões (division two). In September 2020, he signed a permanent two-year contract with the latter.

From January 2021 to June 2022, Rui Pedro continued competing in his country's second division with Penafiel, but he only managed to score five times in all competitions during his tenure. In August 2022, he agreed to a deal at Olimpija Ljubljana of the Slovenian PrvaLiga. He claimed the double in his first season at the latter, contributing six goals in the league.

Rui Pedro was deemed surplus to requirements by manager Zoran Zeljković in January 2024 due to contract issues, in spite of leading the team and league in scoring and having been voted Player of the Month for the previous November. He moved to Turkey on 9 February, signing a two-and-a-half-year deal with Süper Lig club Hatayspor but leaving in November 2025.

== Career statistics ==
As of match played 14 December 2023

Appearances and goals by club, season and competition
Club	Season	League			National cup		League cup		Continental		Total	
Club	Season	Division	Apps	Goals	Apps	Goals	Apps	Goals	Apps	Goals	Apps	Goals
Porto B	2014–15	Segunda Liga	3	0	—		—		—		3	0
Porto B	2015–16	LigaPro	1	0	—		—		—		1	0
Porto B	2016–17	LigaPro	16	5	—		—		—		16	5
Porto B	2018–19	LigaPro	3	0	—		—		—		3	0
Porto B	Total		23	5	—		—		—		23	5
Porto	2016–17	Primeira Liga	9	2	0	0	3	0	1 (Note: Appearance in UEFA Champions League)	0	13	2
Boavista (loan)	2017–18	Primeira Liga	19	1	1	0	0	0	—		20	1
Varzim (loan)	2018–19	LigaPro	13	1	0	0	0	0	—		13	1
Granada B (loan)	2019–20	Segunda División B	14	2	—		—		—		14	2
Leixões (loan)	2019–20	LigaPro	2	0	0	0	0	0	—		2	0
Leixões	2020–21	Liga Portugal 2	13	1	2	1	—		—		15	2
Leixões	Total		15	1	2	1	0	0	—		17	2
Penafiel	2020–21	Liga Portugal 2	16	2	0	0	—		—		16	2
Penafiel	2021–22	Liga Portugal 2	24	2	2	0	4	1	—		30	3
Penafiel	Total		40	4	2	0	4	1	—		46	5
Olimpija Ljubljana	2022–23	Slovenian PrvaLiga	27	6	4	0	—		0	0	31	6
Olimpija Ljubljana	2023–24	Slovenian PrvaLiga	19	10	1	0	—		14 (Note: Six appearances and two goals in UEFA Champions League, two appearances in UEFA Europa League, six appearances in UEFA Europa Conference League)	2	34	12
Olimpija Ljubljana	Total		46	16	5	0	—		14	2	65	18
Career total			179	32	10	1	7	1	15	2	211	36

== Honours ==
Porto B

- LigaPro: 2015–16

Olimpija Ljubljana

- Slovenian PrvaLiga: 2022–23
- Slovenian Cup: 2022–23

Individual

- Slovenian PrvaLiga Player of the Month: November 2023
- UEFA European Under-19 Championship Team of the Tournament: 2017
