= Ondřej Šašinka =

Czech footballer

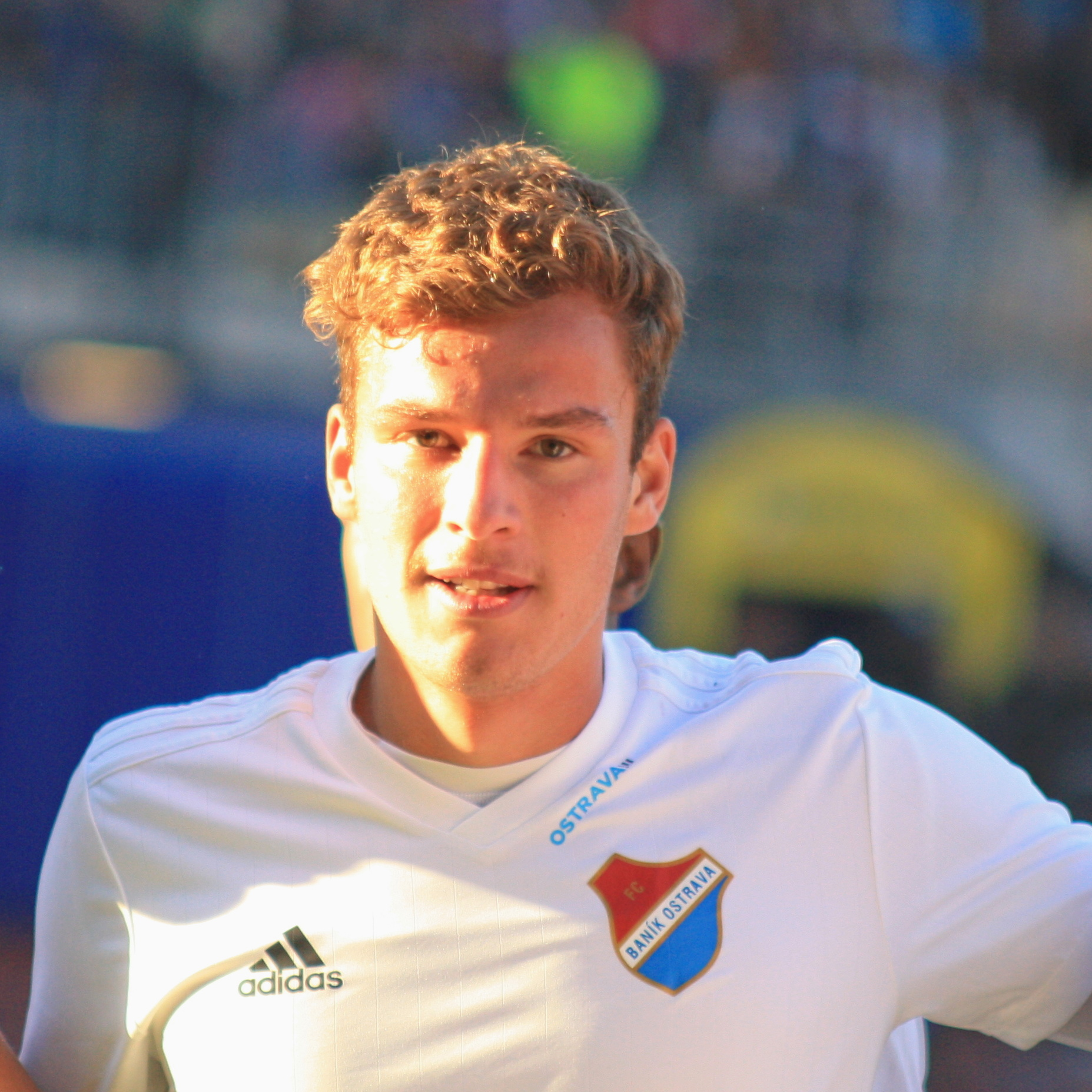

Personal information
- Full name: Ondřej Šašinka
- Date of birth: 21 March 1998 (age 28)
- Place of birth: Frýdek-Místek, Czech Republic
- Height: 1.85 m (6 ft 1 in)
- Position: Forward

Team information
- Current team: Ružomberok
- Number: 38

Youth career
- Ostrava

Senior career*
Years	Team	Apps	(Gls)
2016–2023	Baník Ostrava	70	(4)
2017	→ Senica (loan)	12	(0)
2018	→ ViOn Zlaté Moravce (loan)	12	(2)
2019–2020	→ Slovácko (loan)	14	(5)
2021–2023	→ Slovácko (loan)	32	(2)
2023–2025	Hradec Králové	28	(1)
2023–2025	Hradec Králové B	12	(2)
2025–	Ružomberok	19	(2)

International career^{‡}
2015	Czech Republic U17	6	(3)
2016	Czech Republic U19	4	(2)
2018–	Czech Republic U21	7	(4)
- * Club domestic league appearances and goals as of 25 May 2026 ‡ National team caps and goals as of 18:52, 19 January 2021 (UTC)

Ondřej Šašinka (born 21 March 1998) is a Czech footballer who plays as a forward for Slovak side Ružomberok.

His older brother Jakub is also a football player.

== Career ==
=== FK Senica ===
Šašinka made his professional debut for Senica against Žilina on 18 February 2017.

== Honours ==
Individual

- UEFA European Under-19 Championship Team of the Tournament: 2017
