= Mesaque Djú =

Portuguese association football player

Personal information
- Full name: Mesaque Geremias Djú
- Date of birth: 18 March 1999 (age 27)
- Place of birth: Bissau, Guinea-Bissau
- Height: 1.78 m (5 ft 10 in)
- Position: Winger

Youth career
- 2009–2010: Amadora CF
- 2010–2018: Benfica
- 2018–2022: West Ham United Reserves

Senior career*
Years	Team	Apps	(Gls)
2017–2019	Benfica B	8	(1)
2019–2022	West Ham United	0	(0)
2022–2023	OFI	10	(0)
2023–2024	Mafra	31	(2)
2024	Gorica	10	(0)
2025	Oliveirense	14	(2)
2025–2026	Portimonense	17	(1)

International career^{‡}
2015	Portugal U16	8	(3)
2016	Portugal U17	11	(3)
2017	Portugal U18	2	(1)
2017–2018	Portugal U19	23	(5)
2017–2019	Portugal U20	13	(2)
Medal record
Men's football
Representing Portugal
UEFA European Under-19 Championship
Winner	2018 Finland
Runner-up	2017 Georgia
UEFA European Under-17 Championship
Winner	2016 Azerbaijan
- * Club domestic league appearances and goals as of 20 June 2026 ‡ National team caps and goals as of 28 May 2019

Mesaque Geremias Djú (born 18 March 1999) is a Portuguese professional footballer who plays as a winger. Born in Guinea-Bissau, he was a youth international for Portugal.

== Career ==
=== Benfica B ===
After joining Benfica as a youth player in 2010, Djú made his debut for Benfica B as a 63rd minute substitute in a 4–1 loss to Braga B on 14 May 2017. During his time at Benfica B, he made eight LigaPro appearances, scoring once.

=== West Ham United ===
On 30 January 2019, Djú signed for English club West Ham United on a free transfer.

=== OFI ===
On 28 September 2022, Djú signed for Greek club OFI on a two-year deal.

=== Portimonense ===
On 13 June 2025, Djú joined Portimonense on a two-season contract.

== Honours ==
Benfica

- Campeonato Nacional de Juniores: 2017–18
- 2016–17 UEFA Youth League runner-up: 2016–17

Portugal U17

- UEFA European Under-17 Championship: 2016

Portugal U19

- UEFA European Under-19 Championship: 2018

Individual

- UEFA European Under-19 Championship Team of the Tournament: 2017
