= Gökhan Gül =

German footballer

Personal information
- Date of birth: 17 July 1998 (age 28)
- Place of birth: Castrop-Rauxel, Germany
- Height: 1.80 m (5 ft 11 in)
- Positions: Defensive midfielder; centre-back

Team information
- Current team: Amedspor
- Number: 18

Youth career
- VfB Habinghorst
- –2005: Arminia Ickern
- 2005–2017: VfL Bochum
- 2017: Fortuna Düsseldorf

Senior career*
Years	Team	Apps	(Gls)
2015–2017	VfL Bochum	2	(0)
2017–2021	Fortuna Düsseldorf	1	(0)
2017–2021	Fortuna Düsseldorf II	46	(4)
2019–2020	→ Wehen Wiesbaden (loan)	20	(1)
2021–2023	Gençlerbirliği	49	(9)
2023–2025	Kasımpaşa	63	(4)
2025–2026	Al-Okhdood	33	(1)
2026–	Amedspor	4	(1)

International career
2013–2014	Germany U-16	9	(0)
2014–2015	Germany U-17	19	(2)
2016	Germany U-18	2	(1)
2016–2017	Germany U-19	15	(3)
2017	Germany U-20	1	(0)
Medal record
Men's football
Representing Germany
UEFA European Under-17 Championship
Runner-up	2015 Bulgaria
- * Club domestic league appearances and goals as of 10 October 2026

Gökhan Gül (born 17 July 1998) is a German professional footballer who plays as a defensive midfielder or centre-back for Turkish Süper Lig club Amedspor.

== Club career ==
Gül left Fortuna Düsseldorf upon the expiration of his contract on 24 May 2021.

On 17 July 2025, Gül joined Saudi Pro League club Al-Okhdood.

== International career ==
Gül was born in Germany and is of Turkish descent. He is a youth international for Germany, having played up to the Germany U-20s.

== Career statistics ==
As of 22 August 2018

Appearances and goals by club, season and competition
Club	Season	League			Cup		Total	
Club	Season	Division	Apps	Goals	Apps	Goals	Apps	Goals
VfL Bochum	2014–15	2. Bundesliga	0	0	0	0	0	0
VfL Bochum	2015–16	2. Bundesliga	0	0	0	0	0	0
VfL Bochum	2016–17	2. Bundesliga	2	0	0	0	2	0
VfL Bochum	Total		2	0	0	0	2	0
Fortuna Düsseldorf	2016–17	2. Bundesliga	1	0	0	0	1	0
Fortuna Düsseldorf II	2016–17	Regionalliga West	9	1	–		9	1
Fortuna Düsseldorf II	2017–18	Regionalliga West	15	2	–		15	2
Fortuna Düsseldorf II	2018–19	Regionalliga West	3	0	–		3	0
Fortuna Düsseldorf II	Total		27	3	0	0	27	3
Career total			30	3	0	0	30	3

== Honours ==
Individual

- Fritz Walter Medal U19 Bronze: 2017
