= 1998–99 FC Porto season =

FC Porto
1998–99 season
- President: Jorge Nuno Pinto da Costa
- Head coach: Fernando Santos
- Stadium: Estádio das Antas
- Primeira Divisão: 1st
- Taça de Portugal: Fifth round
- Supertaça Cândido de Oliveira: Winners
- UEFA Champions League: Group stage
- Top goalscorer: League: Mário Jardel (36); All: Mário Jardel (38)
- Average home league attendance: 24,342
colours	colours

The 1998–99 season was the 114th season in the existence of FC Porto and the club's 84th consecutive season in the top flight of Portuguese football. In addition to the domestic league, Porto participated in this season's editions of the Taça de Portugal and the UEFA Champions League.

== Squad ==
Note: Flags indicate national team as defined under FIFA eligibility rules; some limited exceptions apply. Players may hold more than one non-FIFA nationality.

No.	Pos.	Nation	Player
—	GK	POR	Vítor Baía
—	GK	POR	Rui Correia
—	GK	MNE	Ivica Kralj
—	GK	POR	Paulo Costinha
—	DF	POR	Carlos Secretário
—	DF	POR	Fernando Nélson
—	DF	POR	Fernando Mendes
—	DF	BRA	Esquerdinha
—	DF	POR	Jorge Costa (captain)
—	DF	BRA	Aloísio
—	DF	POR	João Pinto
—	DF	POR	Ricardo Carvalho
—	MF	POR	Capucho
—	MF	SRB	Ljubinko Drulović
—	MF	SLO	Zlatko Zahovič

No.	Pos.	Nation	Player
—	MF	POR	Paulinho Santos
—	MF	BRA	Doriva
—	MF	POR	Carlos Chaínho
—	MF	POR	Rui Barros
—	MF	POR	Emílio Peixe
—	MF	MAR	Youssef Chippo
—	MF	BRA	Deco
—	MF	ROU	Basarab Panduru
—	MF	BRA	Artur Oliveira
—	MF	POR	Carlos Manuel
—	FW	BRA	Mário Jardel
—	FW	ANG	Quinzinho
—	FW	POL	Grzegorz Mielcarski
—	FW	HUN	Miklós Fehér
—	FW	POR	António Folha

== Competitions ==
=== Overall record ===
Competition	First match	Last match	Starting round	Final position	Record							
Competition	First match	Last match	Starting round	Final position	Pld	W	D	L	GF	GA	GD	Win %
Primeira Divisão	22 August 1998	30 May 1999	Matchday 1	Winners	34	24	7	3	85	26	+59	70.59
Taça de Portugal	10 January 1999	16 February 1999	Fourth round	Fifth round	2	1	0	1	4	3	+1	50.00
Supertaça Cândido de Oliveira	8 August 1998	9 September 1998	Final	Winners	2	1	1	0	2	1	+1	50.00
UEFA Champions League	16 September 1998	9 December 1999	Group stage	Group stage	6	2	1	3	11	9	+2	33.33
Total					44	28	9	7	102	39	+63	63.64

Source: Competitions

=== Supertaça Cândido de Oliveira ===
8 August 1998 First leg	Porto	1–0	Braga	Porto
WEST (UTC+1)	Costa (yellow card) 26'; Zahovič 75'; Secretário (yellow card) 53'		Jordão (yellow card) 37'; Lino (yellow card) 67'; Dé (yellow card) 82'	Stadium: Estádio das Antas; Referee: Vítor Pereira

9 September 1998 Second leg	Braga	1–1 (1–2 agg.)	Porto	Braga
WEST (UTC+1)	Lino (yellow card) 41'; Idalécio (yellow card) 57'; Formoso 80'		Aloísio (yellow card) 31'; Zahovič (red card) 41'; Drulović (yellow card) 41'; Paulinho Santos (yellow card) 51'; Capucho 69' (yellow card) 69'; João Pinto (yellow card) 89'	Stadium: Estádio Primeiro de Maio; Referee: Jorge Coroado

=== Primeira Liga ===
==== League table ====
Pos	Team	Pld	W	D	L	GF	GA	GD	Pts	Qualification or relegation
1	Porto (C)	34	24	7	3	85	26	+59	79	Qualification to Champions League group stage
2	Boavista	34	20	11	3	57	29	+28	71	Qualification to Champions League third qualifying round
3	Benfica	34	19	8	7	71	29	+42	65	Qualification to UEFA Cup first round
4	Sporting CP	34	17	12	5	64	32	+32	63	Qualification to UEFA Cup first round
5	Vitória de Setúbal	34	15	8	11	37	38	−1	53	Qualification to UEFA Cup first round

Source: Primeira Divisão
Rules for classification: 1st points, 2nd head-to-head, 3rd goals average
(C) Champions

==== Results summary ====
Overall								Home						Away					
Pld	W	D	L	GF	GA	GD	Pts	W	D	L	GF	GA	GD	W	D	L	GF	GA	GD
34	24	7	3	85	26	+59	79	16	0	1	51	9	+42	8	7	2	34	17	+17

Source: Primeira Divisão

==== Results by round ====
Round	1	2	3	4	5	6	7	8	9	10	11	12	13	14	15	16	17	18	19	20	21	22	23	24	25	26	27	28	29	30	31	32	33	34
Ground	H	A	H	A	H	A	H	A	H	A	A	H	A	H	A	H	A	A	H	A	H	A	H	A	H	A	H	H	A	H	A	H	A	H
Result	W	L	W	W	W	W	L	D	W	D	W	W	W	W	W	W	D	D	W	W	W	L	W	D	W	W	W	W	D	W	W	W	D	W
Position	1	9	5	1	2	1	3	4	3	3	3	2	1	1	1	1	1	1	1	1	1	1	1	1	1	1	1	1	1	1	1	1	1	1

Source: Primeira Divisão
A = Away; H = Home; W = Win; D = Draw; L = Loss

==== Matches ====
22 August 1998 1	Porto	4–0	Rio Ave	Porto
WEST (UTC+1)	Doriva 20'; Capucho 34'; Paulinho Santos (yellow card) 46'; Mielcarski 71', 80'	Report	Bolinhas (yellow card) 81'; Coentrão (yellow card) 86'	Stadium: Estádio das Antas; Attendance: 30,000; Referee: António Costa

29 August 1998 2	Beira-Mar	2–1	Porto	Aveiro
WEST (UTC+1)	Gila 24' (yellow card) 77'; Caetano (yellow card) 41'; Quintas (yellow card) 56'; Faye 74'; Silva (yellow card) 75'	Report	Zahovič 14'; Costa (yellow card) 36'; Mendes (yellow card) 44'; Aloísio (yellow card) 88'	Stadium: Estádio Mário Duarte; Attendance: 7,000; Referee: Lucílio Batista

12 September 1998 3	Porto	2–0	Farense	Porto
WEST (UTC+1)	Capucho 7'; Aloísio (yellow card) 29'; Doriva 46'	Report	Paulo Sérgio (yellow card) 13'; Constantino (yellow card) 27'; Gouveia (yellow card) 28'; Eugénio (yellow card) 48'	Stadium: Estádio das Antas; Attendance: 20,000; Referee: Francisco Vicente

20 September 1998 4	Marítimo	0–1	Porto	Funchal
WEST (UTC+1)	Paulo Sérgio (yellow card) 28'; Carlos Jorge (yellow card) 86'	Report	Jardel 4'; Paulinho Santos (yellow card) 42'	Stadium: Estádio dos Barreiros; Attendance: 8,000; Referee: Paulo Paraty

26 September 1998 5	Porto	2–0	Vitória de Guimarães	Porto
WEST (UTC+1)	Paulinho Santos 15' (yellow card) 29'; Mendes (yellow card) 25'; Drulović (yellow card) 27'; Jardel (yellow card) 33' (goal) 62'	Report	Quim Berto (yellow card) 8'; Arley (yellow card) 31'; Gilmar (yellow card) 45'; Evando (yellow card) 65'	Stadium: Estádio das Antas; Attendance: 20,000; Referee: Manuel Martins

4 October 1998 6	Alverca	1–5	Porto	Alverca
WEST (UTC+1)	Ramires 66'; Valido (red card) 89'	Report	Zahovič 8'; Jardel 19', 63' (yellow card) 50'; Capucho 42'; João Pinto 49'; Costa (yellow card) 64'	Stadium: Complexo do Alverca; Attendance: 5,000; Referee: José Pratas

18 October 1998 7	Porto	0–2	Boavista	Porto
WEST (UTC+1)	Capucho (yellow card) 33'; Aloísio (yellow card) 48'; Costa (yellow card) 56'; Secretário (yellow card) 80'	Report	Litos (yellow card) 33'; Timofte 41' (yellow card) 81'; Quevedo (yellow card) 42'; Silva (yellow card) 59'; Bento (yellow card) 85'; Rogério 90'	Stadium: Estádio das Antas; Attendance: 20,000; Referee: Isidoro Rodrigues

26 October 1998 8	União de Leiria	2–2	Porto	Leiria
WET (UTC+0)	João Manuel (yellow card) 6'; Ahinful 8' (yellow card) 64'; Dinda (yellow card) 16'; Žitnjak (yellow card) 45' (yellow-red card) 90'; Nunes (yellow card) 46'; Zezinho 63'; Luís Vouzela (yellow card) 75'	Report	Jardel (yellow card) 26' (goal) 90'; Costa (yellow card) 28'; Secretário (yellow card) 48'; Capucho (yellow card) 68' (goal) 71'; Aloísio (yellow card) 87'	Stadium: Estádio Dr. Magalhães Pessoa; Attendance: 12,000; Referee: Paulo Paraty

31 October 1998 9	Porto	4–1	Salgueiros	Porto
WET (UTC+0)	Jardel 45', 55'; Drulović 51' (pen.); Capucho (yellow card) 61'; Quinzinho 88'	Report	Celso 42'; Fonseca (yellow card) 51'; Almeida (yellow card) 74'; Ferreira (yellow card) 81'; Cao (yellow card) 88'	Stadium: Estádio das Antas; Attendance: 2,000; Referee: Martins dos Santos

9 November 1998 10	Braga	3–3	Porto	Braga
WET (UTC+0)	Silva 17'; Gamboa (yellow card) 34'; Zé Nuno (yellow card) 36'; Jordão 65' (yellow card) 69'; Formoso (yellow card) 75'; Toni 78'	Report	Jardel 22', 73' (yellow card) 40'; Zahovič 27'; Mendes (yellow card) 59'; Paulinho Santos (red card) 67'	Stadium: Estádio Primeiro de Maio; Attendance: 8,000; Referee: António Costa

14 November 1998 11	Campomaiorense	0–2	Porto	Campo Maior
WET (UTC+0)	Ferreira (yellow card) 21'; Miguel (yellow card) 56'; Soares (yellow card) 70'; Rivas (yellow card) 86'	Report	João Pinto (yellow card) 8'; Jardel 35', 60'; Quinzinho (yellow card) 59'; Costa (yellow card) 63'; Correia (yellow card) 77'; Aloísio (yellow card) 88'; Barros (yellow card) 90'	Stadium: Estádio Capitão Cesar Correia; Attendance: 5,000; Referee: Lucílio Batista

21 November 1998 12	Porto	3–1	Benfica	Porto
WET (UTC+0)	Mendes (yellow card) 10'; Chaínho 18'; Doriva (yellow card) 21'; Jardel 39', 54'; Costa (yellow card) 66'; Secretário (yellow card) 76'	Report	Kandaurov 57'; Pinto (yellow card) 66' (yellow-red card) 76'; Calado (yellow card) 70'	Stadium: Estádio das Antas; Attendance: 45,000; Referee: José Pratas

30 November 1998 13	Vitória de Setúbal	1–2	Porto	Setúbal
WET (UTC+0)	Chipenda (yellow card) 46'; Nando (red card) 57'; Amaral (yellow card) 74'; Sousa 81'	Report	Chaínho (yellow card) 8'; Jardel 51', 90'; Mendes (yellow card) 84'; Zahovič (yellow card) 89'	Stadium: Estádio do Bonfim; Attendance: 5,000; Referee: Paulo Costa

5 December 1998 14	Porto	1–0	Chaves	Porto
WET (UTC+0)	Jardel 44'; Secretário (yellow card) 89'	Report	Pérez (yellow card) 35' (yellow-red card) 66'	Stadium: Estádio das Antas; Attendance: 15,000; Referee: Paulo Paraty

14 December 1998 15	Académica Coimbra	0–2	Porto	Coimbra
WET (UTC+0)	Zé Nando (yellow card) 49'; Maurício (yellow card) 57'; Dário (yellow card) 70'; Tó Sá (yellow card) 78'	Report	Mendes (yellow card) 48'; Doriva (yellow card) 71'; Zahovič 79' (pen.); Barros 88'; Mielcarski (yellow card) 89'	Stadium: Estádio Cidade de Coimbra; Attendance: 7,000; Referee: Manuel Martins

19 December 1998 16	Porto	3–2	Sporting CP	Porto
WET (UTC+0)	Doriva 35', 60'; Jardel 62'; Paulinho Santos (yellow card) 89'	Report	Edmílson 13'; Duscher (yellow card) 31'; Vidigal (yellow card) 40'; Saber (yellow card) 59'; Heinze 82'	Stadium: Estádio das Antas; Attendance: 40,000; Referee: Vítor Melo Pereira

3 January 1999 17	Estrela da Amadora	1–1	Porto	Amadora
WET (UTC+0)	Lázaro (yellow card) 37'; Assis 65'; Andrade (yellow card) 69'; Neves (yellow card) 82'; Gilberto (yellow card) 88'	Report	Secretário (yellow card) 44' (yellow-red card) 57'; João Pinto (yellow card) 65'; Jardel 84'	Stadium: Estádio José Gomes; Attendance: 3,000; Referee: Paulo Costa

18 January 1999 18	Rio Ave	1–1	Porto	Vila do Conde
WET (UTC+0)	Coentrão (yellow card) 3'; Emanuel (yellow card) 10'; Sérgio China (yellow card) 38' (goal) 42'; Martins (yellow card) 71'; Jacaré (yellow card) 83'; Niquinha (yellow card) 85'	Report	Zahovič 2'; Chaínho (yellow card) 15'; Mendes (yellow card) 20'; Paulinho Santos (yellow card) 88'	Stadium: Estádio dos Arcos; Attendance: 8,000; Referee: Paulo Paraty

24 January 1999 19	Porto	7–0	Beira-Mar	Porto
WET (UTC+0)	Capucho 29'; Jardel 37', 43', 55', 66'; João Pinto 44'; Mendes (yellow card) 58'; Zahovič 64'; Emílio Peixe (yellow card) 73'; Aloísio (yellow card) 89'	Report		Stadium: Estádio das Antas; Attendance: 15,000; Referee: António Marçal

30 January 1999 20	Farense	0–3	Porto	Faro
WET (UTC+0)	Barros 15'; Mendes (yellow card) 18' (goal) 88'; Aloísio (yellow card) 24'; Costa (yellow card) 49'; Chippo (yellow card) 83'; Paulinho Santos (yellow card) 84'; Zahovič 90+3'	Report	Nader (yellow card) 1'; Serôdio (yellow card) 4' (yellow-red card) 20'; Eugénio (yellow card) 26'; Beširović (yellow card) 69'; Paixão (red card) 77'	Stadium: Estádio de São Luís; Attendance: 5,000; Referee: Manuel Martins

5 February 1999 21	Porto	1–0	Marítimo	Porto
WET (UTC+0)	Capucho (yellow card) 26'; Drulović 32'; Mendes (yellow card) 55'; Costa (yellow card) 90'	Report	Afonso (yellow card) 36'; Eusébio (yellow card) 90'; Jokanović (yellow card) 90'; Alex Bach (yellow card) 90'	Stadium: Estádio das Antas; Attendance: 20,000; Referee: João Vilas Boas

13 February 1999 22	Vitória de Guimarães	3–2	Porto	Guimarães
WET (UTC+0)	Riva 15'; Márcio Theodoro (yellow card) 20'; Edmilson (yellow card) 29' (goal) 36'; Arley (yellow card) 44'; José Carlos (yellow card) 49'; Söderström 66'	Report	Jardel 34', 83' (yellow card) 70'; Costa (yellow card) 41'; Secretário (yellow card) 46'; Aloísio (yellow card) 79'; Zahovič (red card) 85'	Stadium: Estádio D. Afonso Henriques; Attendance: 12,000; Referee: José Pratas

21 February 1999 23	Porto	3–1	Alverca	Porto
WET (UTC+0)	Costa 24' (yellow card) 33'; Jardel 53' (pen.), 83' (pen.)	Report	Abel (yellow card) 26'; Soares (yellow card) 29' (yellow-red card) 83'; Maniche 32'; Morais (yellow card) 66'	Stadium: Estádio das Antas; Attendance: 15,000; Referee: Bento Marques

28 February 1999 24	Boavista	0–0	Porto	Porto
WET (UTC+0)	Luís Manuel (yellow card) 23'; Rogerinho (yellow card) 80'	Report	Drulović (yellow card) 31'; Mendes (yellow card) 44'; Jardel (yellow card) 55'	Stadium: Estádio do Bessa; Attendance: 8,000; Referee: Jorge Coroado

13 March 1999 25	Porto	3–1	União de Leiria	Porto
WET (UTC+0)	Aloísio 16'; Jardel 58'; Peixe (yellow card) 78' (goal) 82'	Report	Costa 74' (o.g.)	Stadium: Estádio das Antas; Attendance: 10,000; Referee: Paulo Costa

20 March 1999 26	Salgueiros	1–3	Porto	Porto
WET (UTC+0)	Paulinho (yellow card) 14'; Cao (yellow card) 37'; Teixeira (yellow card) 40'; Cândido 79'	Report	Zahovič 3'; Jardel 35', 77'; Secretário (yellow card) 60'; Chaínho (yellow card) 72'	Stadium: Estádio Engenheiro Vidal Pinheiro; Attendance: 7,000; Referee: Manuel Martins

10 April 1999 27	Porto	1–0	Braga	Porto
WEST (UTC+1)	Jardel (yellow card) 15' (yellow-red card) 33'; Capucho (yellow card) 15'; Zahovič 82'	Report	Lino (yellow card) 16'; Idalécio (yellow card) 33' (yellow-red card) 38'; Luís Carlos (yellow card) 51'; Jordão (yellow card) 53'	Stadium: Estádio das Antas; Attendance: 26,552; Referee: Gomes Araújo

18 April 1999 28	Porto	2–0	Campomaiorense	Porto
WEST (UTC+1)	Costa (yellow card) 15'; Quinzinho 17', 47'; Esquerdinha (yellow card) 52'; Capucho (yellow card) 64'	Report	Soares (yellow card) 23'; Campos (yellow card) 38'; Laelson (yellow card) 44'; Luís Miguel (yellow card) 73'; Sousa (yellow card) 89'	Stadium: Estádio das Antas; Attendance: 24,011; Referee: Paulo Baptista

24 April 1999 29	Benfica	1–1	Porto	Lisbon
WEST (UTC+1)	Guiaro (yellow card) 3'; Harkness (yellow card) 32'; Basto 48' (yellow card) 77'; Calado (yellow card) 85'	Report	Zahovič 40'; Deco (yellow card) 44'; Costa (yellow card) 66'; Quinzinho (yellow card) 88'	Stadium: Estádio da Luz; Attendance: 40,000; Referee: Jorge Coroado

2 May 1999 30	Porto	6–0	Vitória de Setúbal	Porto
WEST (UTC+1)	Capucho 5'; Zahovič 11'; Jardel 31'; Aloísio 43', 59'; Quinzinho 85'	Report	Mamede (yellow card) 25'; Loja (yellow card) 27'; Nando (yellow card) 89'	Stadium: Estádio das Antas; Attendance: 25,000; Referee: José Pratas

8 May 1999 31	Chaves	0–4	Porto	Chaves
WEST (UTC+1)	Barbosa (yellow card) 50'	Report	Zahovič 12'; Jardel 27', 71'; Aloísio 61' (yellow card) 77'; Chaínho (yellow card) 73'; Costa (yellow card) 89'	Stadium: Estádio Municipal de Chaves; Attendance: 6,000; Referee: Paulo Costa

16 May 1999 32	Porto	7–1	Académica Coimbra	Porto
WEST (UTC+1)	Jardel 24', 38', 85'; Esquerdinha 54'; Chaínho 64'; Zahovič 74'; Costa 82'	Report	Barroso (yellow card) 37'; Tó Sá 63'; Veríssimo (yellow card) 83'; Adriano (yellow card) 89'	Stadium: Estádio das Antas; Attendance: 20,000; Referee: Isidoro Rodrigues

22 May 1999 33	Sporting CP	1–1	Porto	Lisbon
WEST (UTC+1)	Beto (yellow card) 35'; Barbosa 46'; Marcos (yellow card) 57'	Report	Capucho (yellow card) 4'; Zahovič (yellow card) 6' (goal) 85'; Costa (yellow card) 8'; Peixe (yellow card) 74'	Stadium: Estádio José Alvalade; Attendance: 30,000; Referee: Vítor Melo Pereira

30 May 1999 34	Porto	2–0	Estrela da Amadora	Porto
WEST (UTC+1)	Jardel (yellow card) 29' (goal) 66'; Drulović 38'; Nélson (yellow card) 52'; Capucho (yellow card) 65'	Report	Kenedy (yellow card) 34'	Stadium: Estádio das Antas; Attendance: 48,254; Referee: Emanuel Câmara

=== Taça de Portugal ===
10 January 1999 Fourth round	Porto	4–2 (a.e.t.)	Famalicão	Porto
WET (UTC+0)	Barros 56'; Quinzinho 58', 120'; Peixe (yellow card) 65'; Fehér 91' (yellow card) 95'		Ipintza 44'; Sequeira 55'; Rocha (yellow card) 59' (yellow-red card) 98'; Chiquinho (red card) 67'; João Cruz (yellow card) 115'	Stadium: Estádio das Antas; Referee: Luís Miranda

16 February 1999 Fifth round	Porto	0–1	Torreense	Porto
WET (UTC+0)	Mielcarski (yellow card) 38'; Mendes (yellow card) 52'; Carlos Manuel (yellow card) 58'		Tetinha (yellow card) 9'; Hipólito (yellow card) 28'; Duarte (yellow card) 40'; Oeiras 85'	Stadium: Estádio das Antas; Referee: Bruno Paixão

=== UEFA Champions League ===
Pos	Team	Pld	W	D	L	GF	GA	GD	Pts	Qualification
1	(Greece) Olympiacos	6	3	2	1	8	6	+2	11	Advance to knockout stage
2	Croatia Zagreb	6	2	2	2	5	7	−2	8	
3	(Portugal) Porto	6	2	1	3	11	9	+2	7	
4	(Netherlands) Ajax	6	2	1	3	4	6	−2	7	

Source: UEFA

16 September 1998 1	Porto (Portugal)	2–2	(Greece) Olympiacos	Porto
19:45 WEST (UTC+1)	Secretário (yellow card) 26'; Zahovič (yellow card) 44' (goal) 65'; Costa (yellow card) 61'; Jardel 82'	Report	Ofori-Quaye (yellow card) 14'; Poursanidis (yellow card) 25'; Georgatos (yellow card) 43'; Giannakopoulos 87'; Gogić 90'	Stadium: Estádio das Antas; Attendance: 26,000; Referee: Gilles Veissière (France)

30 September 1998 2	Ajax (Netherlands)	2–1	(Portugal) Porto	Amsterdam
19:45 WEST (UTC+1)	Rudy 57'; Litmanen 86' (pen.)	Report	Paulinho Santos (yellow card) 45+1'; Mendes (yellow card) 45+3'; Zahovič 68'	Stadium: Amsterdam Arena; Attendance: 41,000; Referee: Piero Ceccarini (Italy)

21 October 1998 3	Porto (Portugal)	3–0	Croatia Zagreb	Porto
19:45 WEST (UTC+1)	Doriva 33'; Zahovič 43', 75'; Costa (yellow card) 58'	Report	Krznar (yellow card) 41'; Mujčin (yellow card) 76'	Stadium: Estádio das Antas; Attendance: 16,500; Referee: Günter Benkö (Austria)

4 November 1998 4	Croatia Zagreb	3–1	(Portugal) Porto	Zagreb
19:45 WET (UTC+0)	Mikić 7' (yellow card) 69'; Mujčin (yellow card) 23' (goal) 61'; Rukavina 37'; Jeličić (yellow card) 72'	Report	Jardel 39'; Paulinho Santos (yellow card) 41'; Capucho (yellow card) 45'; Aloísio (yellow card) 64'	Stadium: Stadion Maksimir; Attendance: 5,000; Referee: Markus Merk (Germany)

25 November 1998 5	Olympiacos (Greece)	2–1	(Portugal) Porto	Athens
19:45 WET (UTC+0)	Gogić 18'; Đorđević (yellow card) 44' (goal) 55'; Karapialis (yellow card) 47'; Anatolakis (yellow card) 75'; Antzas (red card) 84'	Report	Mendes (yellow card) 13'; Doriva (yellow card) 48'; Capucho (yellow card) 58'; Secretário (yellow card) 69'; Zahovič 76'	Stadium: Olympic Stadium; Attendance: 70,232; Referee: Hugh Dallas (Scotland)

9 December 1998 6	Porto (Portugal)	3–0	(Netherlands) Ajax	Porto
19:45 WET (UTC+0)	João Pinto (yellow card) 43'; Zahovič 54', 73'; Paulinho Santos (yellow card) 60'; Drulović 79' (yellow card) 81'	Report	Wamberto (yellow card) 36'; Blind (yellow card) 42'; Babangida (yellow card) 89'	Stadium: Estádio das Antas; Attendance: 15,000; Referee: Pierluigi Collina (Italy)
