= Fabiano Freitas =

Brazilian footballer (born 1988)

Fabiano
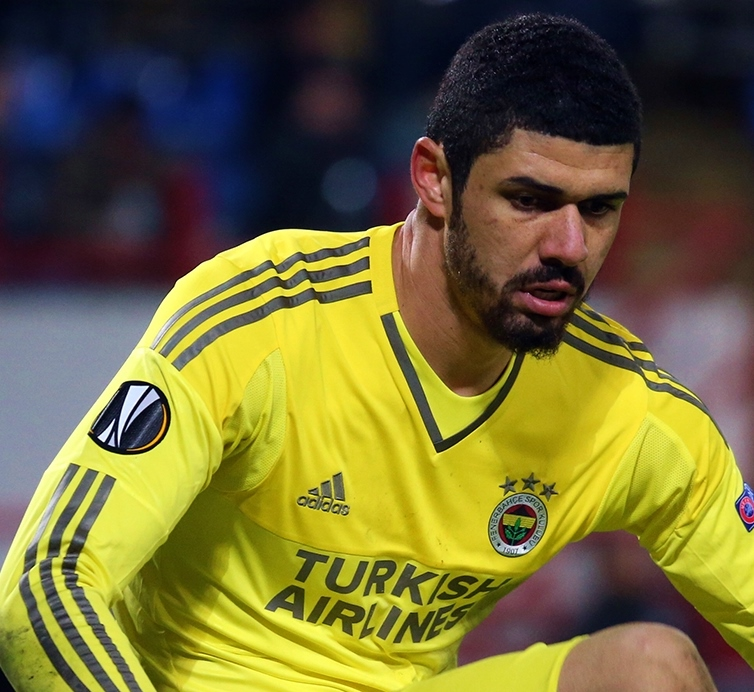
- Fabiano with Fenerbahçe in 2016

Personal information
- Full name: Fabiano Ribeiro de Freitas
- Date of birth: 29 February 1988 (age 38)
- Place of birth: Mundo Novo, Brazil
- Height: 1.97 m (6 ft 6 in)
- Position: Goalkeeper

Team information
- Current team: Omonia
- Number: 40

Youth career
- 2003–2006: Rio Branco-SP

Senior career*
Years	Team	Apps	(Gls)
2007–2011	São Paulo	1	(0)
2009	→ Toledo (loan)		
2010	→ Santo André (loan)	1	(0)
2010	→ América-RN (loan)	7	(0)
2011–2012	Olhanense	30	(0)
2012–2019	Porto B	16	(0)
2012–2019	Porto	37	(0)
2015–2017	→ Fenerbahçe (loan)	8	(0)
2019–	Omonia	161	(0)

International career^{‡}
2025–	Cyprus	10	(0)
- * Club domestic league appearances and goals as of 08:27, 28 May 2026 (UTC) ‡ National team caps and goals as of 20:50, 15 November 2026 (UTC)

Fabiano Ribeiro de Freitas (born 29 February 1988), known simply as Fabiano, is a professional footballer who plays as a goalkeeper for Cypriot First Division club Omonia. Born in Brazil, he plays for the Cyprus national team.

== Club career ==
=== São Paulo and Olhanense ===
Born in Mundo Novo, Bahia, Fabiano joined São Paulo in 2006, aged 18. During his four-year spell he only played two Série A games, also being loaned to several modest teams. He made his debut in the top division on 13 October 2007 in a 1–1 draw against Fluminense at the Maracanã Stadium where he saved a penalty, being part of the squads that won back-to-back national championships.

On 28 June 2011, Fabiano signed with Portuguese club Olhanense. He made his debut in the Primeira Liga on 13 August in a 1–1 draw at Sporting CP, and went on to appear in all league matches during the season as the Algarve side comfortably retained their status.

=== Porto ===
Fabiano moved to Porto in late May 2012, penning a four-year contract. He acted as understudy to compatriot Helton in his debut campaign, subsequently becoming a starter after an injury to the latter.

On 21 April 2015, in an away fixture in the quarter-finals of the UEFA Champions League against Bayern Munich, Fabiano's team lost 6–1, making it the worst in their European history. In the subsequent off-season, he was loaned to Fenerbahçe.

Back at the Estádio do Dragão, Fabiano missed the vast majority of 2017–18 due to an injury to his right knee. He earned a champions' winners medal in the last matchday after playing the last minutes of the 1–0 away win over Vitória de Guimarães, having replaced third choice Vaná.

Fabiano played all the matches save one in the 2018–19 edition of the Taça de Portugal, where his team reached the final. He was not featured in the domestic league, however.

=== Omonia ===
Fabiano signed a one-year deal with Omonia of the Cypriot First Division on 17 October 2019, as a free agent. He made his debut three days later, in a 0–0 away draw with Anorthosis Famagusta. In January 2020, he sustained an injury which kept him out of action until the abandonment of the season due to the COVID-19 pandemic; on 9 June, he agreed to an extension until 2022.

On 16 September 2020, Fabiano was in goal for a Champions League qualifier against Red Star Belgrade, saving two attempts in the penalty shootout to help his team reach the group stage of a European competition for the first time in their history. He was crowned champion on the domestic front, a first for the club since 2010; as a result, he was voted Footballer of the Year and also renewed his contract until June 2024.

In the 2021–22 campaign, Fabiano was involved in four shootouts, helping Omonia beat Anorthosis in the Cypriot Super Cup, Flora Tallinn in the third qualifying round of the UEFA Europa League and Ethnikos Achna in the final of the Cypriot Cup; he prevented the opposition from scoring a total of six times.

On 24 May 2023, Fabiano won the Cypriot Cup for the second year in a row.

== International career ==
After six years living in the country, Fabiano became a citizen of Cyprus. He won his first cap for its national team on 6 September 2025 aged 37, in a 1–0 away loss against Austria in the 2026 FIFA World Cup qualifiers; he was beaten by a 54th-minute penalty from Marcel Sabitzer.

== Career statistics ==
As of match played 7 May 2025

Appearances and goals by club, season and competition
Club	Season	League			National cup (Note: Includes Taça de Portugal, Turkish Cup, Cypriot Cup)		League cup (Note: Includes Taça da Liga)		Continental		Other		Total	
Club	Season	Division	Apps	Goals	Apps	Goals	Apps	Goals	Apps	Goals	Apps	Goals	Apps	Goals
São Paulo	2007	Série A	1	0	—		—		0	0	0	0	1	0
São Paulo	2008	Série A	0	0	—		—		0	0	0	0	0	0
São Paulo	2009	Série A	0	0	—		—		0	0	0	0	0	0
São Paulo	Total		1	0	—		—		0	0	0	0	1	0
Toledo (loan)	2009	Campeonato Paranaense	0	0	—		—		—		—		0	0
Santo André (loan)	2010	Série B	0	0	—		—		—		1 (Note: Appearance in Campeonato Paulista)	0	1	0
América-RN (loan)	2010	Série B	7	0	0	0	—		—		1 (Note: Appearance in Copa do Nordeste)	0	8	0
Olhanense	2011–12	Primeira Liga	30	0	3	0	1	0	—		—		34	0
Porto B	2012–13	Segunda Liga	6	0	—		—		—		—		6	0
Porto B	2013–14	Segunda Liga	7	0	—		—		—		—		7	0
Porto B	2018–19	LigaPro	3	0	—		—		—		—		3	0
Porto B	Total		16	0	—		—		—		—		16	0
Porto	2012–13	Primeira Liga	1	0	3	0	4	0	0	0	0	0	8	0
Porto	2013–14	Primeira Liga	8	0	6	0	4	0	3 (Note: Appearances in UEFA Europa League)	0	0	0	21	0
Porto	2014–15	Primeira Liga	27	0	0	0	0	0	11 (Note: Appearances in UEFA Champions League)	0	—		38	0
Porto	2017–18	Primeira Liga	1	0	0	0	0	0	0	0	—		1	0
Porto	2018–19	Primeira Liga	0	0	6	0	0	0	0	0	0	0	6	0
Porto	Total		37	0	15	0	8	0	14	0	0	0	74	0
Fenerbahçe (loan)	2015–16	Süper Lig	2	0	8	0	—		7	0	—		17	0
Fenerbahçe (loan)	2016–17	Süper Lig	6	0	7	0	—		1	0	—		14	0
Fenerbahçe (loan)	Total		8	0	15	0	—		8	0	—		31	0
Omonia	2019–20	Cypriot First Division	11	0	1	0	—		—		—		12	0
Omonia	2020–21	Cypriot First Division	32	0	2	0	—		11 (Note: Five appearances in UEFA Champions League, six appearances in UEFA Europa League)	0	—		45	0
Omonia	2021–22	Cypriot First Division	20	0	4	0	—		9 (Note: Two appearances in UEFA Champions League, four appearances in UEFA Europa League, three appearances in UEFA Europa Conference League)	0	1 (Note: Appearance in Cypriot Super Cup)	0	34	0
Omonia	2022–23	Cypriot First Division	15	0	5	0	—		5	0	1	0	26	0
Omonia	2023–24	Cypriot First Division	27	0	2	0	—		4 (Note: Appearances in UEFA Europa Conference League)	0	1	0	34	0
Omonia	2024–25	Cypriot First Division	30	0	3	0	—		13	0	—		46	0
Omonia	Total		135	0	17	0	—		42	0	3	0	197	0
Career total			234	0	50	0	9	0	64	0	5	0	362	0

== Honours ==
São Paulo

- Campeonato Brasileiro Série A: 2007

Porto

- Primeira Liga: 2012–13, 2017–18
- Supertaça Cândido de Oliveira: 2012, 2013

Omonia

- Cypriot First Division: 2020–21, 2025–26
- Cypriot Cup: 2021–22, 2022–23
- Cypriot Super Cup: 2021

Individual

- Cypriot First Division Player of the Year: 2020–21
