= List of FC Porto seasons =

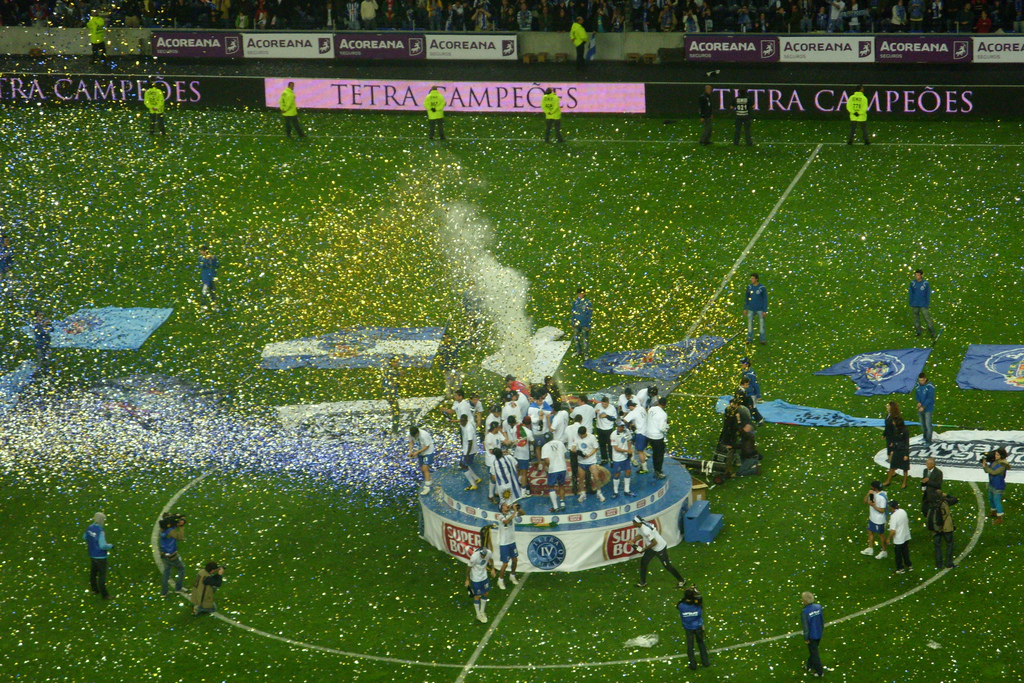
Porto players celebrate the club's 24th championship title and fourth consecutive in 2008–09.

Futebol Clube do Porto is a Portuguese sports club founded in 1893 in Porto. Its association football team played its first competitive matches in 1911, when it took part and won the first edition of the José Monteiro da Costa Cup. Two years later, the club began competing in the Campeonato do Porto, a regional championship organised by the Porto Football Association. In 1921–22, Porto won the inaugural Campeonato de Portugal, a nationwide competition to determine the Portuguese champions from among the winners of the different regional championships.

The Primeira Liga was established in 1934–35 as an experimental nationwide competition played in a league format, and was contested in parallel with the Campeonato de Portugal. Porto were its first winners and repeated the triumph in 1938–39, when it became the official top-tier championship in place of the Campeonato de Portugal, which was converted into the Taça de Portugal. Porto is one of three clubs, together with Benfica and Sporting CP, to have never been relegated from the Primeira Liga since its establishment. Between 1940 and 1978, Porto endured the darkest period of its league history, during which they collected only two titles (1955–56 and 1958–59), and recorded an all-time low ninth place (1969–70). Under the presidency of Jorge Nuno Pinto da Costa (1982–2024), Porto experienced routine league success, winning the competition 23 times in 40 seasons – five of them in succession (1995–1999), a record in Portuguese football. The club achieved their first league and cup double in 1956, and have repeated it eight more times (1988, 1998, 2003, 2006, 2009, 2011, 2020, 2022).

Porto's debut in international competitions took place in 1956–57, when they competed in the second edition of the European Cup. They reached their first European final in 1984, losing the Cup Winners' Cup to Juventus, and won their first European silverware three years later, beating Bayern Munich in the 1987 European Cup final. The following season, Porto collected the European Super Cup and Intercontinental Cup trophies. In 2003, they won the UEFA Cup for the first time, becoming the only Portuguese team to have won any of these three international trophies.

As of the end of the 2025–26 season, Porto have won 87 major honours, (Note: Regional competitions are not considered.) which include 31 Primeira Liga, 20 Taça de Portugal, 1 Taça da Liga, 24 Supertaça Cândido de Oliveira, 4 Campeonato de Portugal, 2 European Cup/UEFA Champions League, 2 UEFA Cup/Europa League, 1 UEFA Super Cup, and 2 Intercontinental Cup. This list details the club's competitive performance and achievements for each season since 1911, and provides statistics and top scorers for domestic (regional and national) championships.

== Key ==
Table headers

- Pos = Final position
- Pld = Matches played
- W = Matches won
- D = Matches drawn
- L = Matches lost
- GF = Goals for
- GA = Goals against
- Pts = Points

Divisions

- Reg = Regional championship (Campeonato do Porto)
- Prim = Primeira Liga / Primeira Divisão (1st tier)

Top scorers

^{‡}	Top league scorer
^{§}	Top scorer of all European leagues

Results and rounds

- 1st or W = Champion or Winner
- 2nd or RU = Runner-up
- 3rd = Third place
- GS / GS2 = Group stage / Second group stage
- PO = Play-offs
- KPO = Knockout phase play-offs
- PR = Preliminary round
- Q3 = Third qualifying round
- QF = Quarter-finals
- R16 / R32 / R64 = Round of 16, 32 and 64
- R1 / R2 / R3 / R4 = First, second, third and fourth round
- SF = Semi-finals

== Seasons ==
This list is updated as of 16 May 2026. Ongoing competitions or player statistics are shown in italics.

FC Porto performance in domestic and international competitions by season
Season	League (Note: Sources: Campeonato do Porto (winners and season statistics); Primeira Liga/Primeira Divisão (winners and season statistics).)									Taça de Portugal	Taça da Liga	International competitions (Note: Sources: European Cup/UEFA Champions League, Cup Winners' Cup, UEFA Cup/Europa League, and Super Cup; Inter-Cities Fairs Cup; Intercontinental Cup.)		Other competitions (Note: Sources: José Monteiro da Costa Cup; Campeonato de Portugal; Supertaça Cândido de Oliveira.)		Top scorer(s) (Note: Unless specified, it includes goals scored in all competitions disputed in that season. Sources: season top scorers until 2010–11; in 2011–12,)	
Season	Division	Pos	Pld	W	D	L	GF	GA	Pts	Taça de Portugal	Taça da Liga	International competitions		Other competitions		Player(s)	Goals
1910–11	—	—	—	—	—	—	—	—	—	—	—	—	—	José Monteiro da Costa Cup	W	—	—
1911–12	—	—	—	—	—	—	—	—	—	—	—	—	—	José Monteiro da Costa Cup	W	—	—
1912–13	—	—	—	—	—	—	—	—	—	—	—	—	—	José Monteiro da Costa Cup	RU	—	—
1913–14	Reg	2nd	2	0	1	1	2	3	—	—	—	—	—	José Monteiro da Costa Cup	W	—	—
1914–15	Reg	1st	2	2	0	0	8	3	—	—	—	—	—	José Monteiro da Costa Cup	W	—	—
1915–16	Reg	1st	3	2	0	1	10	9	—	—	—	—	—	José Monteiro da Costa Cup	W	—	—
1916–17	Reg	1st	2	2	0	0	10	4	—	—	—	—	—	—	—	—	—
1917–18	Reg	2nd	2	1	0	1	3	2	—	—	—	—	—	—	—	—	—
1918–19	Reg	1st	2	2	0	0	9	1	—	—	—	—	—	—	—	—	—
1919–20	Reg	1st	4	3	1	0	20	3	—	—	—	—	—	—	—	—	—
1920–21	Reg	1st	4	4	0	0	10	3	—	—	—	—	—	—	—	—	—
1921–22	Reg	1st	5	5	0	0	30	1	—	—	—	—	—	Campeonato de Portugal	W	Balbino; José Tavares Bastos	2 (Note: Goals scored in the Campeonato de Portugal.)
1922–23	Reg	1st	4	2	2	0	14	6	—	—	—	—	—	Campeonato de Portugal	SF	—	—
1923–24	Reg	1st	6	3	3	0	12	7	—	—	—	—	—	Campeonato de Portugal	RU	Simplício; Norman Hall	2
1924–25	Reg	1st	6	6	0	0	22	8	—	—	—	—	—	Campeonato de Portugal	W	Norman Hall	11
1925–26	Reg	1st	6	3	1	2	16	8	—	—	—	—	—	Campeonato de Portugal	SF	Norman Hall	16
1926–27	Reg	1st	8	6	1	1	37	8	—	—	—	—	—	Campeonato de Portugal	R16	Fridolf Resberg	11
1927–28	Reg	1st	9	9	0	0	39	11	—	—	—	—	—	Campeonato de Portugal	R16	Acácio Mesquita	14
1928–29	Reg	1st	8	7	0	1	44	8	—	—	—	—	—	Campeonato de Portugal	R16	Valdemar Mota	26
1929–30	Reg	1st	8	8	0	0	43	7	—	—	—	—	—	Campeonato de Portugal	R16	Acácio Mesquita	12
1930–31	Reg	1st	9	8	0	1	35	10	—	—	—	—	—	Campeonato de Portugal	RU	Acácio Mesquita	18
1931–32	Reg	1st	8	8	0	0	53	8	—	—	—	—	—	Campeonato de Portugal	W	Pinga; Valdemar Mota	24
1932–33	Reg	1st	12	12	0	0	83	5	—	—	—	—	—	Campeonato de Portugal	SF	Pinga	42
1933–34	Reg	1st	8	6	2	0	37	7	—	—	—	—	—	—	—	Valdemar Mota	11
1934–35	Reg	1st	10	10	0	0	67	12	—	—	—	—	—	Campeonato de Portugal	SF	Valdemar Mota	26
1934–35	Prim	1st	14	10	2	2	43	19	22	—	—	—	—	Campeonato de Portugal	SF	Valdemar Mota	26
1935–36	Reg	1st	10	9	1	0	57	10	—	—	—	—	—	Campeonato de Portugal	QF	Pinga^{‡}	36 (Note: Scored 19 goals in the Primeira Liga.)
1935–36	Prim	2nd	14	9	2	3	50	18	20	—	—	—	—	Campeonato de Portugal	QF	Pinga^{‡}	36
1936–37	Reg	1st	10	9	0	1	57	11	—	—	—	—	—	Campeonato de Portugal	W	Pinga	40
1936–37	Prim	4th	14	6	2	6	31	31	14	—	—	—	—	Campeonato de Portugal	W	Pinga	40
1937–38	Reg	1st	10	10	0	0	62	5	—	—	—	—	—	Campeonato de Portugal	QF	Ângelo Faria	24
1937–38	Prim	2nd	14	11	1	2	42	22	23	—	—	—	—	Campeonato de Portugal	QF	Ângelo Faria	24
1938–39	Reg	1st	10	9	1	0	75	11	—	SF	—	—	—	—	—	Carlos Nunes	40 (Note: Costuras was the team's second-best scorer, with 33 goals, but his 18 goals in the Primeira Divisão made him the league season's top scorer.)
1938–39	Prim (Note: After four experimental seasons, the Primeira Liga was adopted as the official top-tier league championship for the 1938–39 season, superseding the Campeonato de Portugal.)	1st	14	10	3	1	57	20	23	SF	—	—	—	—	—	Carlos Nunes	40
1939–40	Reg	3rd	10	6	3	1	27	13	—	SF	—	—	—	—	—	Slavko Kodrnja^{‡}	37 (Note: Scored 29 goals in the Primeira Divisão, sharing the first place with Sporting CP's Fernando Peyroteo.)
1939–40	Prim	1st	18	17	0	1	76	21	34	SF	—	—	—	—	—	Slavko Kodrnja^{‡}	37
1940–41	Reg	1st	10	9	1	0	61	14	—	QF	—	—	—	—	—	Slavko Kodrnja	32
1940–41	Prim	2nd	14	8	4	2	47	27	20	QF	—	—	—	—	—	Slavko Kodrnja	32
1941–42	Reg	3rd	10	6	1	3	31	12	—	R16	—	—	—	—	—	Correia Dias^{‡}	48 (Note: Scored 36 goals in the Primeira Divisão.)
1941–42	Prim	4th	22	13	2	7	77	48	28	R16	—	—	—	—	—	Correia Dias^{‡}	48
1942–43	Reg	1st	10	9	1	0	58	15	—	SF	—	—	—	—	—	António Araújo	27
1942–43	Prim	7th	18	5	4	9	40	56	14	SF	—	—	—	—	—	António Araújo	27
1943–44	Reg	1st	10	10	0	0	42	4	—	QF	—	—	—	—	—	António Araújo	35
1943–44	Prim	4th	18	10	3	5	46	36	23	QF	—	—	—	—	—	António Araújo	35
1944–45	Reg	1st	10	8	2	0	51	14	—	R1	—	—	—	—	—	Catolino	24
1944–45	Prim	4th	18	9	2	7	64	48	20	R1	—	—	—	—	—	Catolino	24
1945–46	Reg	1st	10	7	2	1	60	19	—	SF	—	—	—	—	—	Correia Dias	50
1945–46	Prim	6th	22	9	2	11	65	44	20	SF	—	—	—	—	—	Correia Dias	50
1946–47	Reg	1st	10	8	2	0	54	11	—	Not held (Note: The Taça de Portugal was not held in the 1946–47 season due to scheduling complications caused by the reformulation of the Portuguese football league system.)	—	—	—	—	—	António Araújo	33
1946–47	Prim	3rd	26	15	3	8	73	45	33	Not held	—	—	—	—	—	António Araújo	33
1947–48	Prim	5th	26	17	2	7	73	42	36	R16	—	—	—	—	—	António Araújo^{‡}	39 (Note: Scored 36 goals in the Primeira Divisão.)
1948–49	Prim	4th	26	16	1	9	55	37	33	QF	—	—	—	—	—	António Araújo	12
1949–50	Prim	5th	26	12	2	12	61	52	26	Not held (Note: The Taça de Portugal was not held in the 1949–50 season because the Estádio Nacional was designated as the host venue for that season's Latin Cup.)	—	—	—	—	—	Monteiro da Costa	17
1950–51	Prim	2nd	26	15	4	7	67	32	34	QF	—	—	—	—	—	Monteiro da Costa	20
1951–52	Prim	3rd	26	15	6	5	68	33	36	SF	—	—	—	—	—	Carlos Vieira	23
1952–53	Prim	4th	26	16	4	6	58	35	36	RU	—	—	—	—	—	José Maria Pedroto	16
1953–54	Prim	2nd	26	16	4	6	83	35	36	QF	—	—	—	—	—	António Teixeira	28
1954–55	Prim	4th	26	12	6	8	51	34	30	R16	—	—	—	—	—	António Teixeira	16
1955–56	Prim	1st	26	18	7	1	77	20	43	W	—	—	—	—	—	Jaburu	29
1956–57	Prim	2nd	26	18	4	4	86	23	40	QF	—	European Cup	PR	—	—	Hernâni	29
1957–58	Prim	2nd	26	21	1	4	64	25	43	W	—	—	—	—	—	Hernâni	21
1958–59	Prim	1st	26	17	7	2	81	22	41	RU	—	—	—	—	—	António Teixeira	35
1959–60	Prim	4th	26	13	4	9	48	36	30	SF	—	European Cup	PR	—	—	Hernâni	18
1960–61	Prim	3rd	26	14	5	7	51	28	33	RU	—	—	—	—	—	Noé	22
1961–62	Prim	2nd	26	14	5	7	51	28	33	R16	—	—	—	—	—	Azumir^{‡}	31 (Note: Scored 23 goals in the Primeira Divisão.)
1962–63	Prim	2nd	26	19	4	3	61	24	42	QF	—	Fairs Cup	R1	—	—	Azumir	20
1963–64	Prim	2nd	26	16	8	2	51	20	40	RU	—	Fairs Cup	R1	—	—	Azumir	20
1964–65	Prim	2nd	26	17	3	6	47	27	37	R32	—	Cup Winners' Cup	R2	—	—	Valdir	16
1965–66	Prim	3rd	26	14	6	6	41	25	34	QF	—	Fairs Cup	R2	—	—	Manuel António	15
1966–67	Prim	3rd	26	17	5	4	56	22	39	SF	—	Fairs Cup	R1	—	—	Djalma	27
1967–68	Prim	3rd	26	16	4	6	60	24	36	W	—	Fairs Cup	R1	—	—	Djalma	27
1968–69	Prim	2nd	26	15	7	4	39	23	37	R32	—	Cup Winners' Cup	R2	—	—	Custódio Pinto	20
1969–70	Prim	9th	26	8	6	12	30	37	22	R32	—	Fairs Cup	R2	—	—	Custódio Pinto	10
1970–71	Prim	3rd	26	16	5	5	44	21	37	QF	—	—	—	—	—	António Lemos	20
1971–72	Prim	5th	30	13	7	10	51	32	33	SF	—	UEFA Cup	R1	—	—	Flávio	23
1972–73	Prim	4th	30	15	7	8	56	28	37	QF	—	UEFA Cup	R3	—	—	Abel Miglietti	24
1973–74	Prim	4th	30	18	7	5	43	22	43	SF	—	—	—	—	—	Abel Miglietti	19
1974–75	Prim	2nd	30	19	6	5	62	30	44	QF	—	UEFA Cup	R2	—	—	Fernando Gomes	17
1975–76	Prim	4th	30	16	7	7	73	33	39	QF	—	UEFA Cup	R3	—	—	Teófilo Cubillas	36
1976–77	Prim	3rd	30	18	5	7	72	27	41	W	—	UEFA Cup	R1	—	—	Fernando Gomes^{‡}	33 (Note: Scored 25 goals in the Primeira Divisão.)
1977–78	Prim	1st	30	22	7	1	81	21	51	RU	—	Cup Winners' Cup	QF	—	—	Fernando Gomes^{‡}	28 (Note: Scored 24 goals in the Primeira Divisão.)
1978–79	Prim	1st	30	21	8	1	70	19	50	R64	—	European Cup	R1	—	—	Fernando Gomes^{‡}	27
1979–80	Prim	2nd	30	22	6	2	59	9	50	RU	—	European Cup	R2	Supertaça	RU	Fernando Gomes	31
1980–81	Prim	2nd	30	21	6	3	53	18	48	RU	—	UEFA Cup	R2	—	—	Mickey Walsh	16
1981–82	Prim	3rd	30	17	9	4	46	17	43	QF	—	Cup Winners' Cup	QF	Supertaça	W	Jacques^{‡}	34 (Note: Scored 27 goals in the Primeira Divisão.)
1982–83	Prim	2nd	30	20	7	3	73	18	47	RU	—	UEFA Cup	R2	—	—	Fernando Gomes^{§}	50 (Note: Scored 36 goals in the Primeira Divisão.)
1983–84	Prim	2nd	30	22	5	3	65	9	49	W	—	Cup Winners' Cup	RU	Supertaça	W	Fernando Gomes^{‡}	22 (Note: Scored 21 goals in the Primeira Divisão, sharing the first place with Benfica's Nené.)
1984–85	Prim	1st	30	26	3	1	78	13	55	RU	—	Cup Winners' Cup	R1	Supertaça	W	Fernando Gomes^{§}	46 (Note: Scored 39 goals in the Primeira Divisão.)
1985–86	Prim	1st	30	22	5	3	64	20	49	R16	—	European Cup	R2	Supertaça	RU	Fernando Gomes	21
1986–87	Prim	2nd	30	20	6	4	67	22	46	SF	—	European Cup	W	Supertaça	W	Fernando Gomes	31
1987–88	Prim	1st	38	29	8	1	88	15	66	W	—	European Cup	R2	—	—	Fernando Gomes	22
1987–88	Prim	1st	38	29	8	1	88	15	66	W	—	Super Cup	W	—	—	Fernando Gomes	22
1987–88	Prim	1st	38	29	8	1	88	15	66	W	—	Intercontinental Cup	W	—	—	Fernando Gomes	22
1988–89	Prim	2nd	38	21	14	3	52	17	56	R16	—	European Cup	R2	Supertaça	RU	Rui Águas	16
1989–90	Prim	1st	34	27	5	2	72	16	59	R16	—	UEFA Cup	R3	—	—	Rui Águas	24
1990–91	Prim	2nd	38	31	5	2	77	22	67	W	—	European Cup	QF	Supertaça	W	Domingos Paciência	31
1991–92	Prim	1st	34	24	8	2	58	11	56	RU	—	Cup Winners' Cup	R2	Supertaça	W	Ion Timofte	13
1992–93	Prim	1st	34	24	6	4	59	17	54	R16	—	Champions League	GS	Supertaça	RU	Emil Kostadinov	15
1993–94	Prim	2nd	34	21	10	3	56	15	52	W	—	Champions League	SF	Supertaça	W	Emil Kostadinov	19
1994–95	Prim	1st	34	29	4	1	73	15	62	SF	—	Cup Winners' Cup	QF	Supertaça	W	Domingos Paciência	28
1995–96	Prim	1st	34	26	6	2	84	20	84 (Note: The 1995–96 league season was the first to use the three-points-per-win system.)	SF	—	Champions League	GS	Supertaça	RU	Domingos Paciência^{‡}	31 (Note: Scored 25 goals in the Primeira Divisão.)
1996–97	Prim	1st	34	27	4	3	80	24	85	SF	—	Champions League	QF	Supertaça	W	Mário Jardel^{‡}	35 (Note: Scored 30 goals in the Primeira Divisão.)
1997–98	Prim	1st	34	24	5	5	75	38	77	W	—	Champions League	GS	Supertaça	RU	Mário Jardel^{‡}	39 (Note: Scored 26 goals in the Primeira Divisão.)
1998–99	Prim	1st	34	24	7	3	85	26	79	R32	—	Champions League	GS	Supertaça	W	Mário Jardel^{§}	38 (Note: Scored 36 goals in the Primeira Divisão.)
1999–2000	Prim	2nd	34	22	7	5	66	26	73	W	—	Champions League	QF	Supertaça	W	Mário Jardel^{‡}	56 (Note: Scored 38 goals in the Primeira Liga.)
2000–01	Prim	2nd	34	24	4	6	73	27	76	W	—	Champions League	Q3	Supertaça	RU	Pena^{‡}	29 (Note: Scored 22 goals in the Primeira Liga.)
2000–01	Prim	2nd	34	24	4	6	73	27	76	W	—	UEFA Cup	QF	Supertaça	RU	Pena^{‡}	29
2001–02	Prim	3rd	34	21	5	8	66	34	68	QF	—	Champions League	GS2	Supertaça	W	Deco	19
2002–03	Prim	1st	34	27	5	2	73	26	86	W	—	UEFA Cup	W	—	—	Derlei	21
2003–04	Prim	1st	34	25	7	2	63	19	82	RU	—	Champions League	W	Supertaça	W	Benni McCarthy^{‡}	25 (Note: Scored 20 goals in the Primeira Liga.)
2003–04	Prim	1st	34	25	7	2	63	19	82	RU	—	Super Cup	RU	Supertaça	W	Benni McCarthy^{‡}	25
2004–05	Prim	2nd	34	17	11	6	39	26	62	R64	—	Champions League	R16	Supertaça	W	Benni McCarthy	14
2004–05	Prim	2nd	34	17	11	6	39	26	62	R64	—	Super Cup	RU	Supertaça	W	Benni McCarthy	14
2004–05	Prim	2nd	34	17	11	6	39	26	62	R64	—	Intercontinental Cup	W	Supertaça	W	Benni McCarthy	14
2005–06	Prim	1st	34	24	7	3	54	16	79	W	—	Champions League	GS	—	—	Lucho González	12
2006–07	Prim	1st	30	22	3	5	65	20	69	R64	—	Champions League	R16	Supertaça	W	Adriano; Lucho González	12
2007–08	Prim	1st	30	24	3	3	60	13	69 (Note: Porto finished the league with 75 points but were punished by the Liga Portuguesa de Futebol Profissional disciplinary committee with a six-point deduction as a result of an investigation on bribery allegations.)	RU	R3	Champions League	R16	Supertaça	RU	Lisandro López^{‡}	27 (Note: Scored 24 goals in the Primeira Liga.)
2008–09	Prim	1st	30	21	7	2	61	18	70	W	SF	Champions League	QF	Supertaça	RU	Lisandro López	22
2009–10	Prim	3rd	30	21	5	4	70	26	68	W	RU	Champions League	R16	Supertaça	W	Radamel Falcao	34
2010–11	Prim	1st	30	27	3	0	73	16	84	W	R3	Europa League	W	Supertaça	W	Radamel Falcao	38 (Note: Hulk was the team's second-best scorer, with 36 goals, but his 23 goals in the Primeira Liga made him the league season's top scorer.)
2011–12	Prim	1st	30	23	6	1	69	19	75	R32	SF	Champions League	GS	Supertaça	W	Hulk	21
2011–12	Prim	1st	30	23	6	1	69	19	75	R32	SF	Europa League	R32	Supertaça	W	Hulk	21
2011–12	Prim	1st	30	23	6	1	69	19	75	R32	SF	Super Cup	RU	Supertaça	W	Hulk	21
2012–13	Prim	1st	30	24	6	0	70	14	78	R16	RU	Champions League	R16	Supertaça	W	Jackson Martínez^{‡}	31 (Note: Scored 26 goals in the Primeira Liga.)
2013–14	Prim	3rd	30	19	4	7	57	25	61	SF	SF	Champions League	GS	Supertaça	W	Jackson Martínez^{‡}	29 (Note: Scored 20 goals in the Primeira Liga.)
2013–14	Prim	3rd	30	19	4	7	57	25	61	SF	SF	Europa League	QF	Supertaça	W	Jackson Martínez^{‡}	29
2014–15	Prim	2nd	34	25	7	2	74	13	82	R64	SF	Champions League	QF	—	—	Jackson Martínez^{‡}	32 (Note: Scored 21 goals in the Primeira Liga.)
2015–16	Prim	3rd	34	23	4	7	67	30	73	RU	R3	Champions League	GS	—	—	Vincent Aboubakar	18
2015–16	Prim	3rd	34	23	4	7	67	30	73	RU	R3	Europa League	R32	—	—	Vincent Aboubakar	18
2016–17	Prim	2nd	34	22	10	2	71	19	76	R32	R3	Champions League	R16	—	—	André Silva	21
2017–18	Prim	1st	34	28	4	2	82	18	88	SF	SF	Champions League	R16	—	—	Moussa Marega	26
2018–19	Prim	2nd	34	27	4	3	74	20	85	RU	RU	Champions League	QF	Supertaça	W	Francisco Soares	22
2019–20	Prim	1st	34	26	4	4	74	22	82	W	RU	Champions League	Q3	—	—	Francisco Soares	19
2019–20	Prim	1st	34	26	4	4	74	22	82	W	RU	Europa League	R32	—	—	Francisco Soares	19
2020–21	Prim	2nd	34	24	8	2	74	29	80	SF	SF	Champions League	QF	Supertaça	W	Mehdi Taremi	25
2021–22	Prim	1st	34	29	4	1	86	22	91	W	R3	Champions League	GS	—	—	Mehdi Taremi	26
2021–22	Prim	1st	34	29	4	1	86	22	91	W	R3	Europa League	R16	—	—	Mehdi Taremi	26
2022–23	Prim	2nd	34	27	4	3	73	22	85	W	W	Champions League	R16	Supertaça	W	Mehdi Taremi^{‡}	31 (Note: Scored 22 goals in the Primeira Liga.)
2023–24	Prim	3rd	34	22	6	6	63	27	72	W	R3	Champions League	R16	Supertaça	RU	Evanilson	25
2024–25	Prim	3rd	34	22	5	7	65	30	71	R4	SF	Europa League	KPO	Supertaça	W	Samu Aghehowa	27
2024–25	Prim	3rd	34	22	5	7	65	30	71	R4	SF	Club World Cup	GS	Supertaça	W	Samu Aghehowa	27
2025–26	Prim	1st	34	28	4	2	66	18	88	SF	QF	Europa League	QF	—	—	Samu Aghehowa	20
Season	Division	Pos	Pld	W	D	L	GF	GA	Pts	Taça de Portugal	Taça da Liga	International competitions		Other competitions		Player(s)	Goals
