= Mundo Novo =

Mundo Novo refers to the following places in Brazil:

- Mundo Novo, Goiás, municipality in Goiás
- Mundo Novo, Bahia, municipality in Bahia
- Mundo Novo, Mato Grosso do Sul, municipality in Mato Grosso do Sul
