= São Miguel do Mato =

São Miguel de Mato may refer to the following places in Portugal:

- São Miguel do Mato (Arouca), a parish in the municipality of Arouca
- São Miguel do Mato (Vouzela), a parish in the municipality of Vouzela
