= Simão Rodrigues =

Portuguese priest

Simão Rodrigues SJ
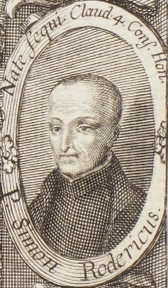
- Detail of Simão Rodrigues on the title page of Chronica da Companhia de Iesv nos Reynos de Portugal, by Balthazar Telles (1645-47)

Personal details
- Born: Simão Rodrigues de Azevedo; 1510 Vouzela, Kingdom of Portugal
- Died: 15 June 1579 (aged 68–69) Lisbon, Kingdom of Portugal
- Denomination: Catholic
- Occupation: Jesuit priest; Co-founder of the Society of Jesus

Simão Rodrigues de Azevedo, SJ (1510 – 15 June 1579), also known in English as Simon Rodericks, was a Portuguese Catholic priest and one of the co-founders of the Society of Jesus.

A Portuguese nobleman, Rodrigues was one of the six very first companions of Ignatius of Loyola at the University of Paris who took vows of poverty and chastity at the chapel of Montmartre, on the 15 August 1534. The group of 'Friends in the Lord' will ultimately form the nucleus of the Society of Jesus, approved in 1540 (in Regimini militantis ecclesiae).

After some years working under the direction of Ignatius in Italy, he was sent to Portugal, where his strong personality immediately attracted many young men to the Society and he became very influential at the royal court. Unfortunately, as the Provincial of the Portuguese Jesuits he allowed certain spiritual devotions to develop into extreme ascetical practices, and thus cause public scandal (night-time public calls to penance, with self-flagellation, in the streets of Coimbra). Several letters of Ignatius, calling to restrain and obedience, fell on deaf ears. The province was in two minds as many Jesuits admired and respected him. Complaints were made and Rodrigues was recalled.

Dragging his feet he finally reached Rome where, at his own request, he was tried (1544). His three Jesuit judges found him guilty of 'excesses and lack of obedience'. All penances were lifted by Ignatius except that he was not allowed to return to Portugal. He was assigned to other duties in Italy and, later, Spain. Rodrigues was recalcitrant and for several years sought to overthrow the decision against him, but his appeals to friends he had made in high places were unsuccessful.

Eventually, he gave up these attempts and returned to obedience. As an old man, he was allowed to go back to his native country, where, before dying, he wrote a history of the early years of the Society.

== Bibliography ==
- A brief and exact account: the recollections of Simao Rodrigues on the origin and progress of the Society of Jesus (Introd. And commentary by Joseph F. Conwell), Saint-Louis (USA), Institute of Jesuit sources, 2004, 104pp.
