= Giles of Santarém =

Blessed Giles of Santarém O.P.
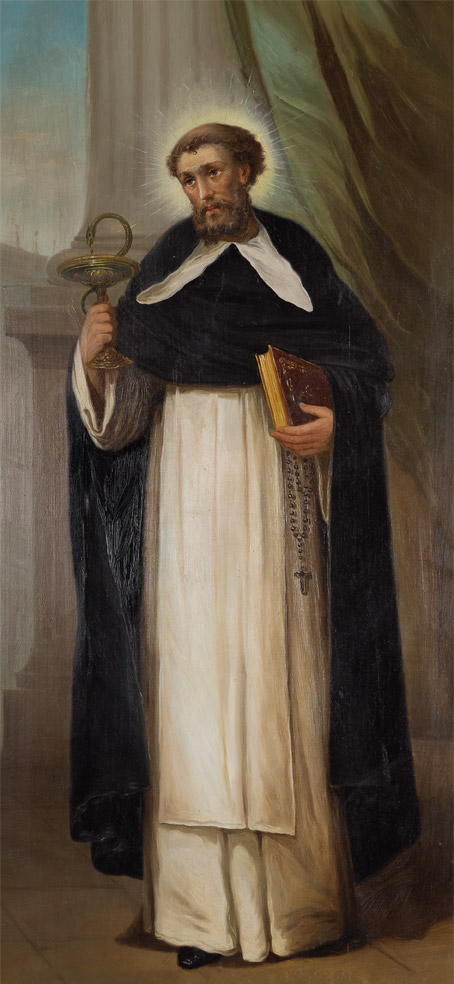
- Painting of Giles of Santarém in the Major Seminary of Viseu.
- Born: Gil Rodrigues de Valadares c. 1185; Vouzela
- Died: May 14, 1265; Santarém
- Beatified: March, 9 1748, Saint Peter's Basilica, Papal States by Pope Benedict XIV

Giles of Santarém (also Gil; ca. 1185 – 14 May 1265) was a Portuguese Dominican scholar.

== Life ==
He was born Gil Rodrigues de Valadares at the castle of Vouzela. His father, Rui Pais de Valadares, was alcaide of Coimbra and councillor of Sancho I. It was the wish of his parents that Giles should enter the ecclesiastical state, and the king was very lavish in bestowing ecclesiastical benefices upon him: still a boy, he already held prebends at Braga, Coimbra, Idanha, and Santarém. Giles, however, wished to become a physician. After devoting some time to the study of philosophy and medicine at Coimbra he set out for Paris.

According to a popular story, he was accosted on his journey by a courteous stranger who promised to teach the art of magic at Toledo. As payment, so the legend runs, the stranger required that Giles should make over his soul to the devil and sign the compact with his blood. Giles obeyed and after devoting himself seven years to the study of magic under the direction of Satan, went to Paris, easily obtained the degree of doctor of medicine, and performed many wonderful cures. One night while he was locked up in his library a gigantic knight, armed head to foot, appeared to him and, with his sword drawn, demanded that Giles should change his wicked life. The same spectre appeared a second time, and threatened to kill Giles if he would not reform.

Giles returned to Portugal, after taking the habit of St. Dominic in the newly erected monastery at Palencia, about 1221. Shortly after, his superiors sent him to the Dominican house at Santarém. Here he led a life of prayer and penance, and for seven years his mind was tormented by the thought of the compact which was still in the hands of Satan. Finally, his biographer narrates, the devil was compelled to surrender the compact and place it before the altar of the Blessed Virgin.

Giles returned to Paris to study theology and on his return to Portugal became famous for his piety and learning. He was twice elected provincial of his order in Castile. He died at Santarém, Portugal. He was beatified on 9 March 1748 by Pope Benedict XIV.

The story did not appear until 300 years after his death, and is rejected by Dominican historians. It was revived in the mid-nineteenth century is some popular accounts of the lives of Dominican saints.
