= 2017–18 FC Porto season =

Porto
2017–18 season
- President: Jorge Nuno Pinto da Costa
- Head coach: Sérgio Conceição
- Stadium: Estádio do Dragão
- Primeira Liga: 1st
- Taça de Portugal: Semi-finals
- Taça da Liga: Semi-finals
- UEFA Champions League: Round of 16
- Top goalscorer: League: Moussa Marega (22 goals); All: Vincent Aboubakar (26 goals)
- Highest home attendance: 50,027; Porto 2–1 C.D Feirense (6 May 2018)
- Lowest home attendance: 26,207; Porto 0–0 Leixões (24 October 2017)
- Average home league attendance: 42,674
Home colours	Away colours	Third colours

The 2017–18 FC Porto season was the club's 108th competitive season and the 84th consecutive season in the top flight of Portuguese football. The season began on 9 August 2017 and concluded on 12 May 2018.

Porto won the 2017–18 Primeira Liga title in the penultimate matchday following a draw between direct rivals Benfica and Sporting CP. In doing so, they secured their first league title since the 2012–13 season and first overall title since the 2013 Supertaça Cândido de Oliveira. Porto also competed in the 2017–18 Taça da Liga and the 2017–18 Taça de Portugal; in both competitions, they reached the semi-finals but were eliminated by Sporting CP after a penalty shootout.

In UEFA competitions, Porto participated for the 7th consecutive and 22nd overall time in the UEFA Champions League group stage, a record shared with Barcelona and Real Madrid. They advanced to the round of 16 as group runners-up, behind Beşiktaş, where they were eliminated by Liverpool.

== Players ==
=== Squad information ===
N	Pos.	Nat.	Name	Age	EU	Since	App	Goals	Ends	Transfer fee	Notes
1	GK	(Spain)	Iker Casillas	45	EU	2015	114	0	2018	Undisclosed	
2	DF	(Uruguay)	Maxi Pereira	42	EU	2015	96	4	2018	Free	
5	DF	(Spain)	Iván Marcano	39	EU	2014	149	12	2018	€2.65M	
6	MF	(Brazil)	Paulinho	32	Non-EU	2018	2	0	2018	Undisclosed	
7	FW	(Portugal)	Hernâni	35	EU	2015	27	3	2019	€2.9M	
8	FW	(Algeria)	Yacine Brahimi	36	EU	2014	158	39	2019	€6.5M	Second nationality: France
9	FW	(Cameroon)	Vincent Aboubakar	34	Non-EU	2014	100	52	2018	€3M	
10	MF	(Spain)	Óliver Torres	31	EU	2014	100	10	2021	€20M	
11	FW	(Mali)	Moussa Marega	35	Non-EU	2016	49	22	2020	€3.8M	
12	GK	(Portugal)	José Sá	33	EU	2016	27	0	2020	Undisclosed	
13	DF	(Brazil)	Alex Telles	33	EU	2016	82	3	2021	€6.5M	Second nationality: Italy
14	FW	(Portugal)	Gonçalo Paciência	32	EU	2014	11	1	2019	Youth system	
16	MF	(Mexico)	Héctor Herrera	36	Non-EU	2013	184	25	2019	€8M	
17	FW	(Mexico)	Jesús Corona	33	Non-EU	2015	113	16	2020	€10.5M	
18	FW	(Ghana)	Majeed Waris	34	Non-EU	2018	8	0	2018	Undisclosed	
20	MF	(Portugal)	André André	37	EU	2015	93	9	2019	€1.5M	
21	FW	(Portugal)	Ricardo Pereira	32	EU	2013	70	4	2019	€1.6M	Second nationality: Cape Verde
22	MF	(Portugal)	Danilo Pereira	35	EU	2015	115	14	2019	€2.8M	
23	DF	(Mexico)	Diego Reyes	33	Non-EU	2013	45	3	2018	€7M	
24	DF	(Venezuela)	Yordan Osorio	32	Non-EU	2018	0	0	2018	Undisclosed	
25	MF	(Brazil)	Otávio	31	Non-EU	2014	49	5	2021	€2.5M	
26	GK	(Brazil)	Vaná	35	Non-EU	2017	0	0	2021	Undisclosed	
27	MF	(Portugal)	Sérgio Oliveira	34	EU	2015	44	6	2020	Undisclosed	
28	DF	(Brazil)	Felipe	37	Non-EU	2016	82	7	2021	€6M	
29	FW	(Brazil)	Soares	35	Non-EU	2017	43	23	2021	€5.6M	
30	DF	(Portugal)	Diogo Dalot	27	EU	2017	8	0	2019	Youth system	
40	GK	(Brazil)	Fabiano Freitas	38	Non-EU	2013	67	0	2019	Undisclosed	
44	DF	(Portugal)	Jorge Fernandes	29	EU	2017	1	0	Undisclosed	Youth system	Also plays for Porto B
50	MF	(Brazil)	Luizão	28	Non-EU	2017	1	0	2022	Youth system	Also plays for Porto B
87	MF	(Portugal)	Bruno Costa	29	EU	2018	1	0	2022	Youth system	Also plays for Porto B
90	FW	(Brazil)	Galeno	28	Non-EU	2017	3	1	2022	Youth system	Also plays for Porto B

- Last updated: 17 March 2018
- Source: FC Porto
- Ordered by squad number.

=== Transfers and loans ===
==== In ====
Date	Pos.	Name	Nationality	Age	Transferred from	Window	Until	Fee	Ref.
15 July 2017	GK	Vaná	Brazil	35	Feirense (Portugal)	Summer	2021	Undisclosed	

==== Out ====
Date	Pos.	Name	Nationality	Age	Transferred to	Window	Fee	Ref.
7 June 2017	DF	Pité	Portugal	32	Tondela (Portugal)	Summer	Free (terminated contract)	
8 June 2017	DF	David Bruno	Portugal	34	Tondela (Portugal)	Summer	Free (terminated contract)	
12 June 2017	FW	André Silva	Portugal	30	Milan (Italy)	Summer	€38M	
12 June 2017	MF	Tomás Podstawski	Portugal	31	Vitória de Setúbal (Portugal)	Summer	Free (terminated contract)	
21 June 2017	GK	Andrés Fernández	Spain	39	Villarreal (Spain)	Summer	€2M	
22 June 2017	DF	Igor Lichnovsky	Chile	32	Necaxa (Mexico)	Summer	€1.8M	
23 June 2017	FW	Laurent Depoitre	Belgium	37	Huddersfield Town (England)	Summer	£3.5M	
27 June 2017	FW	Joris Kayembe	Belgium	32	Nantes (France)	Summer	Free (terminated contract)	
30 June 2017	MF	Francisco Ramos	Portugal	31	Vitória de Guimarães (Portugal)	Summer	Free (terminated contract)	
1 July 2017	MF	Tiago Rodrigues	Portugal	34	CSKA Sofia (Bulgaria)	Summer	Free (terminated contract)	
3 July 2017	MF	Leocísio Sami	Guinea-Bissau	37	Aves (Portugal)	Summer	Free (terminated contract)	
8 July 2017	MF	Rúben Neves	Portugal	29	Wolverhampton Wanderers (England)	Summer	€18M	
14 July 2017	DF	José Ángel	Spain	37	Eibar (Spain)	Summer	Free (terminated contract)	
11 August 2017	DF	Bruno Martins Indi	Netherlands	34	Stoke City (England)	Summer	€7.7M	
30 August 2017	DF	Abdoulaye Ba	Senegal	35	Rayo Vallecano (Spain)	Summer	Undisclosed	
31 January 2018	DF	Rafa Soares	Portugal	31	Portimonense (Portugal)	Winter	Undisclosed	

==== Loan in ====
Date	Pos.	Name	Nationality	Age	Loaned from	Window	Until	Ref.
19 January 2018	FW	Majeed Waris	Ghana	34	Lorient (France)	Winter	30 June 2018	
22 January 2018	MF	Paulinho	Brazil	32	Portimonense (Portugal)	Winter	30 June 2018	
29 January 2018	DF	Yordan Osorio	Venezuela	32	Tondela (Portugal)	Winter	30 June 2018	

==== Loan return ====
Date	Pos.	Name	Nationality	Age	Returned from	Window	Ref.
1 July 2017	DF	Bruno Martins Indi	Netherlands	34	Stoke City (England)	Summer	
1 July 2017	DF	Diego Reyes	Mexico	33	Espanyol (Spain)	Summer	
1 July 2017	DF	Rafa Soares	Portugal	33	Rio Ave (Portugal)	Summer	
1 July 2017	MF	Sérgio Oliveira	Portugal	34	Nantes (France)	Summer	
1 July 2017	FW	Moussa Marega	Mali	35	Vitória de Guimarães (Portugal)	Summer	
1 July 2017	FW	Hernâni	Portugal	35	Vitória de Guimarães (Portugal)	Summer	
1 July 2017	FW	Vincent Aboubakar	Cameroon	34	Beşiktaş (Turkey)	Summer	
1 July 2017	FW	Ricardo Pereira	Portugal	32	Nice (France)	Summer	
28 January 2018	FW	Gonçalo Paciência	Portugal	32	Vitória de Setúbal (Portugal)	Winter	

==== Loan out ====
Date	Pos.	Name	Nationality	Age	Loaned to	Window	Until	Ref.
5 July 2017	DF	Chidozie Awaziem	Nigeria	29	Nantes (France)	Summer	30 June 2018	
8 July 2017	DF	Willy Boly	France	35	Wolverhampton Wanderers (England)	Summer	30 June 2018	
7 August 2017	MF	Mikel Agu	Nigeria	33	Bursaspor (Turkey)	Summer	30 June 2018	
11 August 2017	FW	Adrián López	Spain	38	Deportivo La Coruña (Spain)	Summer	30 June 2018	
22 August 2017	DF	Rafa Soares	Portugal	31	Fulham (England)	Summer	30 June 2018	
30 August 2017	FW	Suk Hyun-jun	South Korea	35	Troyes (France)	Summer	30 June 2018	
31 August 2017	MF	João Carlos Teixeira	Portugal	33	Braga (Portugal)	Summer	30 June 2018	
1 January 2018	FW	Kelvin	Brazil	33	Vasco da Gama (Brazil)	Winter	31 December 2018	
22 January 2018	GK	João Costa	Portugal	30	Gil Vicente (Portugal)	Winter	30 June 2018	
24 January 2018	MF	Juan Quintero	Colombia	33	River Plate (Argentina)	Winter	31 December 2018	
29 January 2018	DF	Miguel Layún	Mexico	38	Sevilla (Spain)	Summer	30 June 2018	
31 January 2018	FW	André Pereira	Portugal	31	Vitória de Setúbal (Portugal)	Winter	30 June 2018	

==== End of loan ====
Date	Pos.	Name	Nationality	Age	Returned to	Window	Ref.
1 July 2017	FW	Diogo Jota	Portugal	29	Atlético Madrid (Spain)	Summer	

== Technical staff ==
Position	Staff
Head coach	(Portugal) Sérgio Conceição
Assistant coach	(France) Siramana Dembélé
Goalkeeping coach	(Portugal) Diamantino Figueiredo
Fitness coach	(Portugal) Vítor Bruno
Physiologist	(Portugal) Eduardo Oliveira

Last updated: 30 July 2017
Source: FC Porto, O Jogo (in Portuguese)

== Pre-season and friendlies ==
Porto began their pre-season on 3 July 2017. The fixture list was announced on 18 June 2017 and included a participation in a tournament in Mexico. The traditional presentation match was played on 30 July against Spanish La Liga side Deportivo de La Coruña.

Win Draw Loss

17 July 2017 Supercopa Tecate	Cruz Azul	0–0 (3–2 p)	Porto	Mexico City, Mexico
21:00 CEST (UTC+02:00)				Stadium: Estadio Azul; Referee: José Soto

19 July 2017 Supercopa Tecate	Guadalajara	2–2	Porto	Guadalajara, Mexico
19:00 CEST (UTC+02:00)	Macías 57'; Fierro 84'		Aboubakar 2'; Otávio 38'	Stadium: Estadio Chivas; Referee: Paul Delgadillo

23 July 2017 Guimarães Trophy	Vitória de Guimarães	0–2	Porto	Guimarães, Portugal
20:30 CEST (UTC+02:00)			Aboubakar 21'; Soares 26'	Stadium: Estádio D. Afonso Henriques; Referee: Jorge Sousa, João Pinheiro

27 July 2017 Friendly	Portimonense	1–5	Porto	Portimão, Portugal
20:30 CEST (UTC+02:00)	Ewerton 33'		Soares 8'; Aboubakar 11'; Brahimi 22', 72'; Hernâni 85'	Stadium: Estádio Municipal de Portimão; Referee: Sérgio Piscarreta

30 July 2017 Presentation	Porto	4–0	Deportivo La Coruña	Porto, Portugal
19:30 CEST (UTC+02:00)	Aboubakar 14', 43'; Corona 55'; Marega 88'			Stadium: Estádio do Dragão; Referee: Fábio Veríssimo, Jorge Sousa

2 August 2017 Friendly	Gil Vicente	1–3	FC Porto	Barcelos, Portugal
20:00 CEST (UTC+02:00)	Rubio 30'		Soares 3', 86', 90+1'	Stadium: Estádio Cidade de Barcelos; Referee: Joel Vale (Braga)

== Competitions ==
As of 13 May 2018

=== Overall record ===
Performance by competition
Competition	Starting round	Final position/round	First match	Last match
Primeira Liga	—N/a	1st	9 August 2017	13 May 2018
Taça de Portugal	Third round	Semi-finals	14 October 2017	18 April 2018
Taça da Liga	Third round	Semi-finals	24 October 2017	24 January 2018
UEFA Champions League	Group stage	Round of 16	13 September 2017	6 March 2018

Statistics by competition
Competition	Pld	W	D	L	GF	GA	GD	Win%
Primeira Liga	34	28	4	2	82	18	+64	82.35
Taça de Portugal	6	5	0	1	16	4	+12	83.33
Taça da Liga	4	2	2	0	6	2	+4	50.00
UEFA Champions League	8	3	2	3	15	15	+0	37.50
Total	52	38	8	6	119	39	+80	73.08

=== Primeira Liga ===
==== League table ====
Pos	Team	Pld	W	D	L	GF	GA	GD	Pts	Qualification or relegation
1	Porto (C)	34	28	4	2	82	18	+64	88	Qualification for the Champions League group stage
2	Benfica	34	25	6	3	80	22	+58	81	Qualification for the Champions League third qualifying round
3	Sporting CP	34	24	6	4	63	24	+39	78	Qualification for the Europa League group stage (Note: Desportivo das Aves qualified for the Europa league group stage by winning the 2017–18 Taça de Portugal. However, since they failed to obtain a license for European competitions, the spot awarded to the cup winners (Europa League group stage) was passed to the third-placed team, the spot awarded to the third-placed team (Europa League third qualifying round) was passed to the fourth-placed team, and the spot awarded to the fourth-placed team was passed to the fifth-placed team (Europa league second qualifying round).)
4	Braga	34	24	3	7	74	29	+45	75	Qualification for the Europa League third qualifying round
5	Rio Ave	34	15	6	13	40	42	−2	51	Qualification for the Europa League second qualifying round

Source: Liga Portugal
Rules for classification: 1) Points; 2) Head-to-head points; 3) Head-to-head goal difference; 4) Head-to-head away goals scored; 5) Goal difference; 6) Matches won; 7) Goals scored; 8) Play-off. (Note: only criteria 1, 5, 6 and 7 are applied to establish the classification during the competition.)
(C) Champions

==== Results by round ====
Round	1	2	3	4	5	6	7	8	9	10	11	12	13	14	15	16	17	18	19	20	21	22	23	24	25	26	27	28	29	30	31	32	33	34
Ground	H	A	H	A	H	A	H	A	H	A	H	A	H	A	H	A	H	A	H	A	H	A	H	A	H	A	H	A	H	A	H	A	H	A
Result	W	W	W	W	W	W	W	D	W	W	W	D	D	W	W	W	W	W	W	D	W	W	W	W	W	L	W	L	W	W	W	W	W	W
Position	1	1	2	2	1	1	1	1	1	1	1	1	1	1	1	1	1	1	1	2	1	1	1	1	1	1	1	2	2	1	1	1	1	1

Updated to match(es) played on 7 May 2018. Source: Liga Portugal
A = Away; H = Home; W = Win; D = Draw; L = Loss

==== Matches ====
9 August 2017 1	Porto	4–0	Estoril	Porto
19:00 CEST (UTC+02:00)	Marega 35', 62'; Brahimi 54'; Marcano 71'	Report		Stadium: Estádio do Dragão; Attendance: 48,011; Referee: Hugo Miguel

13 August 2017 2	Tondela	0–1	Porto	Tondela
20:15 CEST (UTC+02:00)		Report	Aboubakar 37'	Stadium: Estádio João Cardoso; Attendance: 4,987; Referee: Fábio Veríssimo

20 August 2017 3	Porto	3–0	Moreirense	Porto
18:00 CEST (UTC+02:00)	Aboubakar 18', 21', 77'	Report		Stadium: Estádio do Dragão; Attendance: 46,509; Referee: Manuel Oliveira

27 August 2017 4	Braga	0–1	Porto	Braga
20:15 CEST (UTC+02:00)		Report	Corona 7'	Stadium: Estádio AXA; Referee: Carlos Xistra

10 September 2017 5	Porto	3–0	Chaves	Porto
20:30 CEST (UTC+02:00)	Aboubakar 49'; Soares 86'; Marega 88'	Report		Stadium: Estádio do Dragão; Attendance: 43,109; Referee: Rui Oliveira

17 September 2017 6	Rio Ave	1–2	Porto	Vila do Conde
18:00 CEST (UTC+02:00)	Santos 80'	Report	D. Pereira 54'; Marega 67'	Stadium: Estádio do Rio Ave F.C. Attendance: 8,052; Referee: Jorge Sousa

24 September 2017 7	Porto	5–2	Portimonense	Porto
20:30 CEST (UTC+02:00)	Marcano 20'; Aboubakar 22'; Marega 25'; Brahimi 49', 67'	Report	Shoya 36'; Fernandes 72'	Stadium: Estádio do Dragão; Attendance: 38,105; Referee: Luís Ferreira

1 October 2017 8	Sporting CP	0–0	Porto	Lisbon
19:15 CEST (UTC+02:00)		Report		Stadium: Estádio José Alvalade; Attendance: 47,017; Referee: Carlos Xistra

22 October 2017 9	Porto	6–1	Paços de Ferreira	Porto
20:30 CEST (UTC+02:00)	R. Pereira 3'; Felipe 17'; Marega 25', 33'; Corona 65'; Aboubakar 72'	Report	Welthon 7'	Stadium: Estádio do Dragão; Attendance: 40,121; Referee: Manuel Oliveira

29 October 2017 10	Boavista	0–3	Porto	Porto
21:30 CET (UTC+01:00)		Report	Aboubakar 50'; Marega 80'; Brahimi 85'	Stadium: Estádio do Bessa; Attendance: 14,676; Referee: Hugo Miguel

5 November 2017 11	Porto	2–0	Belenenses	Porto
21:30 CET (UTC+01:00)	Herrera 43'; Aboubakar 90'	Report		Stadium: Estádio do Dragão; Attendance: 38,516; Referee: Fábio Veríssimo

26 November 2017 12	Desportivo das Aves	1–1	Porto	Vila das Aves
20:30 CET (UTC+01:00)	Gomes 63'		R. Pereira 6'	Stadium: Estádio do CD Aves; Attendance: 5,393; Referee: Manuel Rui Costa

3 December 2017 13	Porto	0–0	Benfica	Porto
20:30 CET (UTC+01:00)		Report		Stadium: Estádio do Dragão; Attendance: 49,809; Referee: Jorge Sousa

10 December 2017 14	Vitória de Setúbal	0–5	Porto	Setúbal
20:15 CET (UTC+01:00)		Report	Aboubakar 31', 45+3' (pen.), 69'; Marega 40', 83'	Stadium: Estádio do Bonfim; Attendance: 4,228; Referee: Tiago Martins

17 December 2017 15	Porto	3–1	Marítimo	Porto
20:15 CET (UTC+01:00)	Reyes 19'; Marega 45', 78'	Report	Pacheco 26'	Stadium: Estádio do Dragão; Attendance: 34,123; Referee: Manuel Mota

3 January 2018 16	Feirense	1–2	Porto	Santa Maria da Feira
20:15 CET (UTC+01:00)	Rocha 26'	Report	Aboubakar 21'; Felipe 75'	Stadium: Estádio Marcolino de Castro; Attendance: 5,113; Referee: Fábio Veríssimo

7 January 2018 17	Porto	4–2	Vitória de Guimarães	Porto
20:15 CET (UTC+01:00)	Aboubakar 57'; Brahimi 62'; Marega 79', 83'	Report	Raphinha 22'; Héldon 88'	Stadium: Estádio do Dragão; Attendance: 40,309; Referee: Artur Soares Dias

15 January 2018 18	Estoril	1–0 (Note: The match was abandoned at half-time due to safety reasons involving one of the stadium stands that forced evacuation of spectators onto the pitch.)	Porto	Estoril
21:00 CET (UTC+01:00)	Eduardo 16'	Report		Stadium: Estádio António Coimbra da Mota

20 January 2018 19	Porto	1–0	Tondela	Porto
21:00 CET (UTC+01:00)	Marega 13'	Report		Stadium: Estádio do Dragão; Attendance: 32,711; Referee: Luís Godinho

30 January 2018 20	Moreirense	0–0	Porto	Moreira de Cónegos
21:00 CET (UTC+01:00)		Report		Stadium: Parque de Jogos Comendador Joaquim de Almeida Freitas; Attendance: 3,232; Referee: Luís Ferreira

3 February 2018 21	Porto	3–1	Braga	Porto
20:30 CET (UTC+01:00)	Oliveira 13'; Reyes 38'; Aboubakar 73'	Report	Silva 31'	Stadium: Estádio do Dragão; Attendance: 43,627; Referee: Hugo Miguel

11 February 2018 22	Chaves	0–4	Porto	Chaves
16:00 CET (UTC+01:00)		Report	Soares 14', 28'; Marega 57'; Oliveira 91'	Stadium: Estádio Municipal Eng. Manuel Branco Teixeira; Referee: Artur Soares Dias

18 February 2018 23	Porto	5–0	Rio Ave	Porto
18:00 CET (UTC+01:00)	Oliveira 2'; Soares 22', 86'; Marega 34', 72'	Report		Stadium: Estádio do Dragão; Attendance: 42,127; Referee: Carlos Xistra

21 February 2018 18	Estoril	1–3	Porto	Estoril
20:15 CET (UTC+01:00)	Eduardo 16'	Report	Telles 52'; Soares 59', 65'	Stadium: Estádio António Coimbra da Mota; Attendance: 4,437; Referee: Vasco Santos

25 February 2018 24	Portimonense	1–5	Porto	Portimão
20:15 CET (UTC+01:00)	Marega 10', 44'; Otávio 16'; Soares 59'; Brahimi 66'	Report	Possignolo 90+2'	Stadium: Estádio Municipal de Portimão; Attendance: 5,517; Referee: Jorge Sousa

2 March 2018 25	Porto	2–1	Sporting CP	Porto
20:30 CET (UTC+01:00)	Marcano 29'; Brahimi 49'	Report	Leão 45+1'	Stadium: Estádio do Dragão; Attendance: 48,405; Referee: Artur Soares Dias

11 March 2018 26	Paços de Ferreira	1–0	Porto	Paços de Ferreira
20:15 CET (UTC+01:00)	Vieira 34'	Report		Stadium: Estádio da Mata Real; Attendance: 7,232; Referee: Bruno Paixão

18 March 2018 27	Porto	2–0	Boavista	Porto
20:30 CET (UTC+01:00)	Felipe 2'; Herrera 62'	Report		Stadium: Estádio do Dragão; Attendance: 45,428; Referee: Manuel Oliveira

31 March 2018 28	Belenenses	2–0	Porto	Lisbon
20:00 CEST (UTC+02:00)	Nathan 10'; Maurides 70'	Report		Stadium: Estádio do Restelo; Attendance: 12,851; Referee: Hugo Miguel

7 April 2018 29	Porto	2–0	Desportivo das Aves	Porto
18:00 CEST (UTC+02:00)	Telles 8'; Otávio 11'	Report		Stadium: Estádio do Dragão; Attendance: 39,213; Referee: Nuno Almeida

15 April 2018 30	Benfica	0–1	Porto	Lisbon
18:00 CEST (UTC+02:00)		Report	Herrera 90'	Stadium: Estádio da Luz; Attendance: 63,526; Referee: Artur Soares Dias

22 April 2018 31	Porto	5–1	Vitória de Setúbal	Porto
20:00 CEST (UTC+02:00)	Marega 5'; Marcano 13'; Brahimi 15'; Corona 35'; Telles 72'	Report	Amaral 23'	Stadium: Estádio do Dragão; Attendance: 45,311; Referee: João Pinheiro

29 April 2018 32	Marítimo	0–1	Porto	Funchal, Madeira
18:00 CEST (UTC+02:00)		Report	Marega 89'	Stadium: Estádio dos Barreiros; Attendance: 10,535; Referee: Carlos Xistra

6 May 2018 33	Porto	2–1	Feirense	Porto
20:15 CEST (UTC+02:00)	Oliveira 37'; Brahimi 59'	Report	Valencia 90'	Stadium: Estádio do Dragão; Attendance: 50,027; Referee: Luís Godinho

12 May 2018 34	Vitória de Guimarães	0–1	Porto	Guimarães
16:00 CEST (UTC+02:00)		Report	Marcano 69'	Stadium: Estádio D. Afonso Henriques; Attendance: 20090; Referee: João Capela

=== Taça de Portugal ===
==== Third round ====
13 October 2017	Lusitano Évora (D)	0–6	(I) Porto	Lisbon
20:15 WEST (UTC+01:00)			Aboubakar 20', 21'; Marcano 49'; Otávio 55'; Galeno 59'; Hernâni 90'	Stadium: Estádio do Restelo; Referee: Hélder Malheiro

==== Fourth round ====
17 November 2017	Porto (I)	3–2	(I) Portimonense	Porto
20:30 WET (UTC±00:00)	D. Pereira 4'; Aboubakar 90+1'; Brahimi 90+6'		Wellington 30'; Sá 69'	Stadium: Estádio do Dragão; Referee: Artur Soares Dias

==== Fifth round ====
14 December 2017	Porto (I)	4–0	(I) Vitória de Guimarães	Porto
20:15 WET (UTC±00:00)	Aboubakar 12' (pen.); D. Pereira 58'; André 64', 83'			Stadium: Estádio do Dragão; Referee: Carlos Xistra

==== Quarter-finals ====
11 January 2018	Moreirense (I)	1–2	(I) Porto	Moreira de Cónegos
20:30 WET (UTC±00:00)	Edno 73'		Herrera 8'; Layún 20'	Stadium: Parque de Jogos Comendador Joaquim de Almeida Freitas; Referee: Manuel Moreira

==== Semi-finals ====
7 February 2018 First leg	Porto (I)	1–0	(I) Sporting CP	Porto
20:15 WET (UTC±00:00)	Soares 60'			Stadium: Estádio do Dragão; Attendance: 32,855; Referee: João Pinheiro

18 April 2018 Second leg	Sporting CP (I)	1–0 (a.e.t.) (1–1 agg.) (5–4 p)	(I) Porto	Lisbon
20:30 WET (UTC±00:00)	Coates 86'			Stadium: Estádio José Alvalade; Referee: Jorge Sousa
	Penalties
	Fernandes (penalty scored); B. Ruiz (penalty scored); Mathieu (penalty scored); Coates (penalty scored); Montero (penalty scored)		(penalty missed) Marcano; (penalty scored) Telles; (penalty scored) Felipe; (penalty scored) Reyes; (penalty scored) Oliveira

=== Taça da Liga ===
==== Third round ====
Pos	Team	Pld	W	D	L	GF	GA	GD	Pts	Qualification
1	Porto	3	2	1	0	6	2	+4	7	Advanced to knockout phase
2	Leixões	3	1	1	1	3	3	0	4	
3	Rio Ave	3	1	1	1	4	6	−2	4	
4	Paços de Ferreira	3	0	1	2	3	5	−2	1	

Source: LPFP
Rules for classification: Tiebreakers

24 October 2017	Porto	0–0	Leixões	Porto
20:15 WEST (UTC+01:00)		Report		Stadium: Estádio do Dragão; Attendance: 26,207; Referee: Vasco Santos

21 December 2017	Porto	3–0	Rio Ave	Porto
21:15 WET (UTC+00:00)	Soares 11'; Marega 21'; Aboubakar 90+1' (pen.)	Report		Stadium: Estádio do Dragão; Attendance: 27,911; Referee: Nuno Almeida

30 December 2017	Paços de Ferreira	2–3	Porto	Paços de Ferreira
20:15 WET (UTC±00:00)	Luiz Phellype 30', 45'	Report	Reyes 17'; Brahimi 21'; Aboubakar 49'	Stadium: Estádio Capital do Móvel; Attendance: 5,227; Referee: Bruno Esteves

==== Semi-finals ====
24 January 2018	Sporting CP	0–0 (a.e.t.) (4–3 p)	Porto	Braga
20:45 WET (UTC±00:00)		Report		Stadium: Estádio Municipal de Braga; Attendance: 26,536; Referee: Nuno Almeida
	Penalties
	Dost (penalty scored); Fernandes (penalty scored); Mathieu (penalty scored); Coates (penalty missed); Carvalho (penalty missed); B. Ruiz (penalty scored)		(penalty scored) Telles; (penalty scored) Marcano; (penalty missed) Herrera; (penalty scored) Waris; (penalty missed) Aboubakar; (penalty missed) Brahimi

=== UEFA Champions League ===
==== Group stage ====
Pos	Team	Pld	W	D	L	GF	GA	GD	Pts	Qualification	BES	POR	RBL	MON
1	(Turkey) Beşiktaş	6	4	2	0	11	5	+6	14	Advance to knockout phase	—	1–1	2–0	1–1
2	(Portugal) Porto	6	3	1	2	15	10	+5	10	Advance to knockout phase	1–3	—	3–1	5–2
3	(Germany) RB Leipzig	6	2	1	3	10	11	−1	7	Transfer to Europa League	1–2	3–2	—	1–1
4	(France) Monaco	6	0	2	4	6	16	−10	2		1–2	0–3	1–4	—

Source: UEFA

13 September 2017 1	Porto	1–3	Beşiktaş	Porto
20:45 CEST (UTC+02:00)	Tošić 21' (o.g.)	Report	Talisca 13'; Tosun 28'; Babel 86'	Stadium: Estádio do Dragão; Attendance: 42,429; Referee: Anthony Taylor (England)

26 September 2017 2	Monaco	0–3	Porto	Monaco
20:45 CEST (UTC+02:00)		Report	Aboubakar 31', 69'; Layún 89'	Stadium: Stade Louis II; Attendance: 11,703; Referee: Slavko Vinčić (Slovenia)

17 October 2017 3	RB Leipzig	3–2	Porto	Leipzig
20:45 CEST (UTC+02:00)	Orbán 8'; Forsberg 38'; Augustin 41'	Report	Aboubakar 18'; Marcano 44'	Stadium: Red Bull Arena; Attendance: 41,496; Referee: Paolo Tagliavento (Italy)

1 November 2017 4	Porto	3–1	RB Leipzig	Porto
20:45 CET (UTC+01:00)	Herrera 13'; D. Pereira 61'; M. Pereira 90+3'	Report	Werner 48'	Stadium: Estádio do Dragão; Attendance: 41,616; Referee: Ovidiu Hațegan (Romania)

21 November 2017 5	Beşiktaş	1–1	Porto	Istanbul
18:00 CET (UTC+01:00)	Talisca 41'	Report	Felipe 29'	Stadium: Vodafone Park; Attendance: 36,919; Referee: Antonio Mateu Lahoz (Spain)

6 December 2017 6	Porto	5–2	Monaco	Porto
20:45 CET (UTC+01:00)	Aboubakar 9', 33'; Brahimi 45'; Telles 65'; Soares 88'	Report	Glik 61' (pen.); Falcao 78'	Stadium: Estádio do Dragão; Attendance: 42,509; Referee: Jonas Eriksson (Sweden)

==== Knockout phase ====
===== Round of 16 =====
14 February 2018 First leg	Porto (Portugal)	0–5	(England) Liverpool	Porto, Portugal
19:45 GMT		Report	Mané 25', 53', 85'; Salah 29'; Firmino 69'	Stadium: Estádio do Dragão; Attendance: 47,718; Referee: Daniele Orsato (Italy)

6 March 2018 Second leg	Liverpool (England)	0–0	(Portugal) Porto	Liverpool, England
19:45 GMT		Report		Stadium: Anfield; Attendance: 48,768; Referee: Felix Zwayer (Germany)

== Statistics ==
As of 6 May 2018

=== Appearances and discipline ===
Numbers in parentheses denote appearances as substitute.

No.	Pos.	Nat.	Player	Primeira Liga				Taça de Portugal				Taça da Liga				Champions League				Total			
No.	Pos.	Nat.	Player	Apps	Yellow card	Second yellow card	Red card	Apps	Yellow card	Second yellow card	Red card	Apps	Yellow card	Second yellow card	Red card	Apps	Yellow card	Second yellow card	Red card	Apps	Yellow card	Second yellow card	Red card
1	GK	(Spain)	Iker Casillas	19 (1)	0	0	0	5 (0)	0	0	0	3 (0)	0	0	0	3 (0)	1	0	0	30 (1)	1	0	0
2	DF	(Uruguay)	Maxi Pereira	12 (3)	2	0	0	2 (0)	0	0	0	2 (0)	0	0	0	3 (1)	1	0	0	19 (4)	3	0	0
5	DF	(Spain)	Iván Marcano	24 (1)	5	0	0	4 (0)	1	0	0	3 (0)	0	0	0	7 (0)	0	0	0	38 (1)	6	0	0
6	MF	(Brazil)	Paulinho	2 (1)	0	0	0	0 (0)	0	0	0	0 (0)	0	0	0	0 (0)	0	0	0	2 (1)	0	0	0
7	FW	(Portugal)	Hernâni	10 (9)	1	0	0	4 (1)	1	0	0	1 (0)	0	0	0	2 (2)	0	0	0	17 (12)	2	0	0
8	FW	(Algeria)	Yacine Brahimi	26 (1)	1	0	0	4 (1)	0	0	0	4 (1)	0	0	0	7 (0)	1	0	0	41 (3)	2	0	0
9	FW	(Cameroon)	Vincent Aboubakar	24 (1)	2	0	0	4 (1)	0	0	0	4 (3)	0	0	0	6 (0)	0	0	0	38 (5)	2	0	0
10	MF	(Spain)	Óliver Torres	13 (6)	2	0	0	3 (1)	0	0	0	2 (1)	1	0	0	3 (1)	0	0	0	21 (9)	3	0	0
11	FW	(Mali)	Moussa Marega	24 (2)	1	0	0	2 (0)	0	0	0	4 (1)	1	0	0	6 (0)	0	0	0	36 (3)	2	0	0
12	GK	(Portugal)	José Sá	14 (0)	1	0	1	1 (0)	0	0	0	1 (0)	0	0	0	5 (0)	0	0	0	21 (0)	1	0	1
13	DF	(Brazil)	Alex Telles	23 (0)	1	0	0	4 (0)	1	0	0	3 (0)	0	0	0	7 (0)	0	0	0	37 (0)	2	0	0
14	FW	(Portugal)	Gonçalo Paciência	4 (3)	0	0	0	1 (1)	0	0	0	0 (0)	0	0	0	2 (2)	0	0	0	7 (6)	0	0	0
16	MF	(Mexico)	Héctor Herrera	22 (3)	6	0	0	3 (0)	0	0	0	3 (0)	0	0	1	6 (0)	1	0	0	34 (3)	7	0	1
17	FW	(Mexico)	Jesús Corona	23 (7)	5	1	0	3 (0)	0	0	0	3 (2)	0	0	0	8 (5)	0	0	0	37 (14)	5	1	0
18	FW	(Ghana)	Majeed Waris	5 (4)	2	0	0	0 (0)	0	0	0	1 (1)	0	0	0	2 (1)	0	0	0	8 (6)	2	0	0
19	DF	(Mexico)	Miguel Layún	7 (4)	1	0	0	2 (1)	1	0	0	3 (2)	0	0	0	2 (1)	0	0	0	15 (8)	2	0	0
20	MF	(Portugal)	André André	12 (9)	1	0	0	4 (2)	0	0	0	3 (1)	0	0	0	4 (2)	3	0	0	23 (14)	4	0	0
21	DF	(Portugal)	Ricardo Pereira	21 (1)	1	0	0	4 (1)	1	0	0	3 (0)	0	0	0	7 (1)	1	0	0	35 (3)	3	0	0
22	MF	(Portugal)	Danilo Pereira	18 (0)	5	0	0	3 (0)	0	0	0	2 (0)	2	1	0	6 (0)	2	0	0	29 (0)	9	1	0
23	DF	(Mexico)	Diego Reyes	11 (3)	2	0	0	3 (0)	0	0	0	1 (0)	0	0	0	6 (4)	0	0	0	21 (7)	2	0	0
24	DF	(Venezuela)	Yordan Osorio	0 (0)	0	0	0	0 (0)	0	0	0	0 (0)	0	0	0	0 (0)	0	0	0	0 (0)	0	0	0
25	MF	(Brazil)	Otávio	11 (6)	4	0	0	2 (1)	0	0	0	1 (0)	0	0	0	2 (1)	0	0	0	16 (8)	4	0	0
26	GK	(Brazil)	Vaná	1 (0)	0	0	0	0 (0)	0	0	0	0 (0)	0	0	0	0 (0)	0	0	0	1 (0)	0	0	0
27	MF	(Portugal)	Sérgio Oliveira	13 (4)	2	0	0	1 (0)	0	0	0	1 (0)	0	0	0	5 (1)	3	0	0	20 (5)	5	0	0
28	DF	(Brazil)	Felipe	24 (0)	5	1	0	3 (0)	1	0	0	3 (0)	1	0	0	7 (0)	0	0	1	37 (0)	7	1	1
29	FW	(Brazil)	Soares	17 (12)	1	0	0	3 (1)	0	0	0	3 (0)	1	0	0	3 (1)	0	0	0	26 (14)	2	0	0
30	DF	(Portugal)	Diogo Dalot	6 (2)	0	0	0	1 (0)	0	0	0	0 (0)	0	0	0	1 (0)	1	0	0	8 (2)	1	0	0
40	GK	(Brazil)	Fabiano	0 (1)	0	0	0	0 (0)	0	0	0	0 (0)	0	0	0	0 (0)	0	0	0	0 (1)	0	0	0
44	DF	(Portugal)	Jorge Fernandes	0 (0)	0	0	0	1 (0)	0	0	0	0 (0)	0	0	0	0 (0)	0	0	0	1 (0)	0	0	0
50	MF	(Brazil)	Luizão	0 (0)	0	0	0	1 (0)	0	0	0	0 (0)	0	0	0	0 (0)	0	0	0	1 (0)	0	0	0
87	MF	(Portugal)	Bruno Costa	0 (0)	0	0	0	0 (0)	0	0	0	0 (0)	0	0	0	1 (0)	0	0	0	1 (0)	0	0	0
90	FW	(Brazil)	Galeno	2 (2)	0	0	0	1 (0)	0	0	0	0 (0)	0	0	0	0 (0)	0	0	0	3 (2)	0	0	0
95	FW	(Portugal)	André Pereira	1 (1)	0	0	0	1 (1)	0	0	0	0 (0)	0	0	0	0 (0)	0	0	0	2 (2)	0	0	0
Total					54	2	1		6	0	0		6	1	1		14	0	1		80	3	3

=== Goalscorers ===
Rank	No.	Pos.	Nat.	Player	Primeira Liga	Taça de Portugal	Taça da Liga	Champions League	Total
1	9	FW	(Cameroon)	Vincent Aboubakar	15	4	2	5	26
2	11	FW	(Mali)	Moussa Marega	20	0	1	0	21
3	29	FW	(Brazil)	Soares	8	1	1	1	11
4	8	FW	(Algeria)	Yacine Brahimi	7	1	1	1	10
5	28	DF	(Brazil)	Felipe	3	0	0	1	4
5	16	MF	(Mexico)	Héctor Herrera	2	1	0	1	4
5	5	DF	(Spain)	Iván Marcano	3	1	0	1	5
5	22	MF	(Portugal)	Danilo Pereira	1	2	0	1	4
9	27	MF	(Portugal)	Sérgio Oliveira	3	0	0	0	3
9	23	DF	(Mexico)	Diego Reyes	2	0	1	0	3
11	20	MF	(Portugal)	André André	0	2	0	0	2
11	17	FW	(Mexico)	Jesús Corona	2	0	0	0	2
11	19	DF	(Mexico)	Miguel Layún	0	1	0	1	2
11	25	MF	(Brazil)	Otávio	1	1	0	0	1
11	21	DF	(Portugal)	Ricardo Pereira	2	0	0	0	2
16	90	FW	(Brazil)	Galeno	0	1	0	0	1
16	7	FW	(Portugal)	Hernâni	0	1	0	0	1
16	2	DF	(Uruguay)	Maxi Pereira	0	0	0	1	1
16	13	DF	(Brazil)	Alex Telles	0	0	0	1	1
Total					70	16	6	14	106

=== Hat-tricks ===
Player	Against	Result	Date	Competition
(Cameroon) Vincent Aboubakar	Moreirense (H)	3–0	20 August 2017	Primeira Liga
(Cameroon) Vincent Aboubakar	Vitória de Setúbal (A)	0–5	10 December 2017	Primeira Liga

(H) – Home; (A) – Away

=== Clean sheets ===
No.	Player	Primeira Liga	Taça de Portugal	Taça da Liga	Champions League	Total
1	(Spain) Iker Casillas	11	2	2	2	17
12	(Portugal) José Sá	7	1	1	0	9
26	(Brazil) Vaná	0	0	0	0	0
40	(Brazil) Fabiano	0	0	0	0	0
Totals		18	3	3	2	26
