= Paulo Alexandre =

Portuguese singer (1931–2024)

- Born: 16 February 1931; Vouzela, Portugal
- Died: 17 November 2024 (aged 93)
- Occupations: Singer, actor
- Instrument: Vocals
- Years active: 1954–early 1990s

Paulo Alexandre (16 February 1931 – 16 November 2024) was a Portuguese singer.

Alexandre started his artistic career in 1954 on National Radio. Together with António Sala they started Rossil records, Verde Vinho gained two gold discs in 1978 and 1979, before also being a big hit in Brazil also going gold.

In 2010, Paulo published the book "Duas Vidas numa Só", subtitled "Entre Cifrões e Canções", which includes accounts of his artistic career and also his successful career as a banker. The Compact Records released a CD with some of the most successful songs of the artist.

Alexandre died on 17 November 2024, at the age of 93.

== Discography ==
=== Albums ===
- Eu e o Outro (LP, Transmédia) VLP 50.002
- Canções Da Minha (CD)
- Melhor dos Melhores nº 90 (CD)
- Tributo (CD, Polygram, 1991)
- Canções da Minha Saudade, vol.1 (CD, Movieplay, 1993)
- Verde Vinho - Colecção Caravela (CD, EMi)
- O melhor dos melhores #90 (CD, Movieplay, 1999)
- Verde Vinho (CD, Compact, 2010)

=== Singles and EPs ===
- Agora Ou Nunca/Ana Cristina/Escravo/Nocturno (EP, Alvorada) AEP 60533
- Dancemos O Twist/Horizonte de Esperança/T-4/Galope (EP, Alvorada) AEP 60615
- Estranhos Na Noite (EP, Alvorada)
- História de Amor/Um Dia, Amor (Orfeu)
- Concerto Para Ti/África (O Primeiro Do Emigrante) (Single, Orfeu, 1976) KSAT 554
- Verde Vinho/Vem Valsar Com o Papá (Single, Rossil, 1977) Ross 7001
- Oferece As Tuas Mãos/Foi Tudo (Single, Rossil, 1978) Ross 7007
- Voltei Para Ficar/Rosas Vermelhas Para O Meu Amor (Single, Rossil) Ross 7010
- Meninos da Cidade/ Gaiato de Lisboa (Single, Rossil) Ross 7021
- Aquela Cativa/Alma Perdida (Single, Rossil) Ross 7066
- Vem Comigo a Portugal / Ven conmigo A Portugal (Single, Rossil, 1979)
- Vede Minho (Single, CBS, 1983)
- Verde Vinho (New recording/Verde Vinho (orchestral version) (Single, CBS) CBS A4446
- Guitarra Minha Amiga/Versão Instrumental (Single, Polygram, 1987)
