= Cao (footballer, born 1968) =

Portuguese footballer

Personal information
- Full name: Carlos Alberto Correia Fortes
- Date of birth: 20 October 1968 (age 58)
- Place of birth: Praia, Cape Verde
- Height: 1.78 m (5 ft 10 in)
- Position: Defensive midfielder

Youth career
- 1988–1990: Porto

Senior career*
Years	Team	Apps	(Gls)
1990–1991	Porto	0	(0)
1991–1992	Rio Ave	22	(0)
1992–1993	Tirsense	2	(0)
1993–1997	Leça	114	(7)
1997–1999	Salgueiros	59	(1)
1999–2002	Campomaiorense	59	(2)
2002–2003	Felgueiras	28	(1)
2004–2005	Leça		
2005–2006	Rio Tinto		
2008–2009	Salgueiros 08	9	(0)
Total		293	(11)

International career
1990–1991	Portugal U20	6	(0)
1992	Portugal U21	3	(0)
Medal record
Men's football
Representing Portugal
FIFA U-20 World Cup
Winner	1991 Portugal
- * Club domestic league appearances and goals

Carlos Alberto Correia Fortes (born 20 October 1968), commonly known as Cao, is a former professional footballer who played as a defensive midfielder.

== Club career ==
Cao was born in Praia, Cape Verde. After unsuccessfully emerging through FC Porto's youth academy, he went on to play 12 seasons in the two major levels of Portuguese football, representing Rio Ave FC (Segunda Liga), F.C. Tirsense (Primeira Liga), Leça FC (first and second tiers), S.C. Salgueiros (both), S.C. Campomaiorense (both) and F.C. Felgueiras (second).

Cao retired from professional football in 2003 with totals of 284 matches and 11 goals, going on to spend the rest of his career in amateur football, which included a second spell with Leça. Subsequently, he worked as a graphic designer.

== International career ==
Cao was part of the Portugal under-20 team that won the 1991 FIFA World Youth Championship, with the competition being held on home soil. In 2002, it was revealed that he had in fact been born in 1968, meaning he was crowned champion at the age of 22.
