= Fernando Mendes (footballer, born 1966) =

Portuguese footballer

Personal information
- Full name: Fernando Manuel Antunes Mendes
- Date of birth: 5 November 1966 (age 59)
- Place of birth: Setúbal, Portugal
- Height: 1.78 m (5 ft 10 in)
- Position: Left-back

Youth career
- 1979–1980: Montijo
- 1980–1985: Sporting CP

Senior career*
Years	Team	Apps	(Gls)
1985–1989	Sporting CP	94	(1)
1989–1993	Benfica	28	(1)
1991–1992	→ Boavista (loan)	32	(0)
1993–1994	Estrela Amadora	18	(0)
1994–1995	Boavista	13	(0)
1995–1996	Belenenses	31	(3)
1996–1999	Porto	61	(5)
1999–2000	Belenenses	22	(2)
2000–2002	Vitória Setúbal	51	(10)
2004–2005	Montijo		
2005–2008	São Marcos		
2008–2009	Olímpico Montijo		
Total		350	(22)

International career
1982	Portugal U14	4	(0)
1983–1984	Portugal U16	8	(0)
1984–1986	Portugal U18	10	(0)
1986–1988	Portugal U21	3	(0)
1988	Portugal Olympic	1	(0)
1986–1996	Portugal	11	(0)
- * Club domestic league appearances and goals

Fernando Manuel Antunes Mendes (born 5 November 1966) is a Portuguese former footballer who played as a left-back. He is the only player to have represented the five Portuguese clubs who have won a Primeira Liga title (Sporting CP, Benfica, Boavista, Belenenses and Porto).

== Club career ==
Mendes was born in Setúbal. Having been brought up at Sporting CP's youth system at the same time as Paulo Futre, he made his first-team debut in 1984–85 aged 18, and reached the Portugal national team shortly after. In the following seasons, he started regularly for the Lions but they only won one trophy.

In summer 1989, Mendes joined Sporting's rivals S.L. Benfica, being sparingly used over three years – in between, he spent one season at Boavista F.C. – winning the Taça de Portugal in his last, where he teamed up with Futre. Released by Benfica, he appeared for three teams in as many years before joining the last of the Big Three, FC Porto, thus representing all the major clubs in his country as Futre.

Mendes won his first Primeira Liga championship with the northern side in 1996–97 (the second overall), contributing 22 matches and three goals to the feat. In the following two campaigns, which ended in the same fashion, he was also regularly played.

Aged nearly 33, Mendes left for another spell at Belenenses, then joined hometown's Vitória F.C. for his first season in the Segunda Liga, which ended in promotion. After helping the Sadinos to retain their league status, he retired from professional football with top-division totals of 321 games and 12 goals.

== International career ==
Mendes earned 11 full caps in one decade, but did not attend any major international tournament. He made his debut on 12 October 1986 at age 19 as practically the entire squad had renounced the national team after the infamous Saltillo Affair, in a 1–1 home draw against Sweden for the UEFA Euro 1988 qualifiers.

== Honours ==
Sporting CP

- Supertaça Cândido de Oliveira: 1987

Benfica

- Primeira Liga: 1990–91
- Taça de Portugal: 1992–93

Boavista

- Taça de Portugal: 1991–92

Porto

- Primeira Liga: 1996–97, 1997–98, 1998–99
- Taça de Portugal: 1997–98
- Supertaça Cândido de Oliveira: 1996, 1998; runner-up: 1997
