= Norman Hall (footballer) =

English footballer (1897–?)

Personal information
- Date of birth: 12 October 1897
- Place of birth: England
- Position: Forward

Senior career*
Years	Team	Apps	(Gls)
1916–1917	Staines Town		
1918–1920	Woking		
1920–1922	Chesterfield		
1922–1931	Porto	71	(57)
- * Club domestic league appearances and goals

Norman Hall (12 October 1897) was an English footballer who played as a forward for Portuguese club Porto for nine seasons, scoring 57 goals in 71 games played at the Portuguese and Regional Championships, very high numbers in that period of history.

== Career ==
After an eventful career in England, in which he played for the likes of Staines Town, Woking, and Chesterfield, Hall moved to Portugal due to work reasons. He was working as a commercial employee when he had the opportunity to join the ranks of FC Porto in 1922, at the age of 25. He signed up as a member of the Dragons in September 1922, with number 2337, after several months playing in the blue and white shirt where he showed his natural talent for football.

Under the guidance of French coach Adolphe Cassaigne, Hall quickly became the club's striker in the FC Porto squad. Even though he did not participate in the team that won the club's very first official Portuguese football competition in 1922, Hall scored a hat-trick against SC Espinho in the semifinal of the 1924–25 Campeonato de Portugal, and then in the final, which was held in Viana do Castelo, he opened the scoring in a 2–1 victory against Sporting CP, thus contributing decisively in the club's second national title. This was his second goal in the final of a Portuguese championship, having already scored in the previous final, but in a 4–2 loss to Olhanense.

For an away match against Belenenses in 1927, FC Porto already had two foreign players in their eleven (Mihaly Siska, a Hungarian who had been recruited by the then Porto coach Akos Tezler, his compatriot, and Fridolf Resberg, a Norwegian who belonged to the Consulate of Norway in Porto, and who one day appeared in the Constitution to train and become a striker), so even though FC Porto understood that Norman Hall, who had lived in Portugal since he was eight years old and who had played for the club since 1920, was "morally" a Portuguese player, the club did not want to take risks, and asked the Portuguese Football Federation, via the Porto Football Association, whether or not Norman Hall would be considered a Portuguese player to comply with the regulations. This issue was appreciated and discussed at a meeting of the executive committee of the Portuguese Championship, which was attended by Manuel Mesquita, the representative of FC Porto, among other delegates, with the final decision coinciding with Porto's point of view, classifying Norman Hall as a Portuguese player. In the said match against Belenenses, FC Porto conceded a last-minute equalizer when the referee from Beja failed to disallow a goal that was clearly offside, thus taking the match into extra time, during which Belenenses scored again with another goal offside, as the press at the time unanimously recognized. FC Porto was compensated in 500 escudos.

Hall's career at FC Porto would have come to an end in 1931, when he hung up his boots. In total, he was at FC Porto for nine seasons, between 1922 and 1931. In total, he scored 57 goals in 71 just games at the Portuguese and Regional Championships, very high numbers in that period of history, but despite his goalscoring prowess, he failed to earn a single international cap for both England and Portugal. He also won eight titles, including a Portuguese Championship in 1925.

Due to the abilities that he demonstrated on the field and his great human qualities, Hall was elevated to honorary member of FC Porto in 1930, shortly after finishing his football career, during a party that included a football match between FC Porto and CD Candal from Vila Nova de Gaia, which contested the Norman Hall Cup, a one-off trophy named after him and which was won by Porto (5–2).

Hall was the first Englishman to ever play for FC Porto and also the only one to have done so for over 90 years, until the club signed Danny Loader in 2021, who made his debut against Boavista on 30 October 2021, scoring in injury time to seal a 4–1 victory. Loader then had to wait nearly a year to make his debut for Porto as a starter, on 30 July, in the 2022 Supertaça Cândido de Oliveira, thus becoming the second Englishmen to do so after Hall.

== Later life ==
Hall lived in Lisbon, for professional reasons, where he worked in the communications office at the Embassy of the United States of America.> In 1952, he helped to import, from England, the seeds that gave rise to the first pitch at the Estádio das Antas, which opened that year.

== Honours ==
Porto

- Campeonato de Portugal: 1924–25; runner-up 1923–24
- Campeonato Regional do Porto (7)
