= Luís Vouzela =

Portuguese footballer

Personal information
- Full name: Luís Miguel Silva Tavares
- Date of birth: 10 March 1974 (age 52)
- Place of birth: Vouzela, Portugal
- Height: 1.68 m (5 ft 6 in)
- Position: Midfielder

Youth career
- 1989–1991: Vouzelenses
- 1991–1992: Académico Viseu

Senior career*
Years	Team	Apps	(Gls)
1992–1996	Académico Viseu	82	(5)
1996–2002	União Leiria	158	(4)
2002–2004	Santa Clara	44	(0)
2004–2005	Moreirense	38	(0)
2005–2006	Beira-Mar	20	(1)
2006–2007	Olympiakos Nicosia	10	(0)
2007–2008	Chaves	25	(1)
2008–2009	Nelas	19	(0)
2009–2010	Penalva do Castelo	30	(1)
2010–2012	Académico Viseu	41	(0)
2012–2013	Nogueirense	23	(2)
2013–2014	Oliveira Frades	20	(0)
Total		510	(14)

International career
2000	Portugal B	1	(0)
- * Club domestic league appearances and goals

Luís Miguel Silva Tavares (born 10 March 1974), commonly known as Luís Vouzela, is a Portuguese retired footballer who played as a defensive midfielder.

He amassed Primeira Liga totals of 215 games and four goals over the course of eight seasons, mainly with União de Leiria (five years).

== Club career ==
Born in Vouzela, Viseu District, Vouzela started his senior career with local Académico de Viseu FC, going on to remain four seasons with the club, two apiece in the second and third divisions. He made his debut in the Primeira Liga in the 1996–97 season with U.D. Leiria, playing 28 games and scoring one goal but suffering team relegation as second from bottom.

From 1998 to 2005 Vouzela competed almost exclusively in his country's top flight, representing Leiria, C.D. Santa Clara and Moreirense FC. He split the 2003–04 campaign with the last two teams, starting it with the former in division two; in 2005–06 he helped S.C. Beira-Mar promote to the top tier of Portuguese football, as champions.

After one year in the Cypriot First Division, with Olympiakos Nicosia, Vouzela returned to his country, going on to play exclusively in lower league and amateur football. He returned to Académico Viseu in the 2010 summer, suffering a serious leg injury the following year. He retired in 2014 at the age of 40, after one season in the Viseu regional championships with Grupo Desportivo Oliveira de Frades, and returned once again to Académico, where he was given a position in the backroom staff.
