= José Monteiro da Costa Cup =

- Organiser(s): FC Porto
- Founded: 1910
- Abolished: 1916
- Region: Portugal
- Most championships: FC Porto (5 titles)

The José Monteiro da Costa Cup (Portuguese: Taça José Monteiro da Costa), also known as North of Portugal Championship (Campeonato do Norte de Portugal), was a Portuguese football competition established by FC Porto in 1910 to honour its president José Monteiro da Costa. Participating teams played against each other and were required to field an all-Portuguese squad. The winners would host the tournament in the following year, and the first team to win it three consecutive times would become the outright winners.

Porto won the competition in its first two years, but Académica de Coimbra prevented Porto's ultimate win in 1913. In the following year, Porto recovered the title at Académica's ground and won the cup definitely after securing their third consecutive win in 1916.

== Editions ==
Year	Winner	Runner-up
1911	Porto	Leixões
1912	Porto	Académica de Coimbra
1913	Académica de Coimbra	Porto
1914	Porto	Académica de Coimbra
1915	Porto	Académico do Porto
1916	Porto	Boavista

== Performances by club ==
Club	Winner	Runner-up	Years won	Years runner-up
Porto	5	1	1911, 1912, 1914, 1915, 1916	1913
Académica de Coimbra	1	2	1913	1912, 1914
Leixões	0	1	—	1911
Académico do Porto	0	1	—	1915
Boavista	0	1	—	1916
