= Vaná =

Brazilian footballer

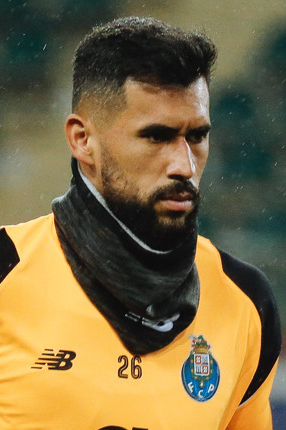
- Vaná training with Porto in 2018

Personal information
- Full name: Vanailson Luciano de Souza Alves
- Date of birth: 25 April 1991 (age 35)
- Place of birth: Planaltina, Federal District, Brazil
- Height: 1.94 m (6 ft 4 in)
- Position: Goalkeeper

Team information
- Current team: Aris Limassol
- Number: 1

Youth career
- 2006–2010: Atlético-PR
- 2010–2012: Coritiba

Senior career*
Years	Team	Apps	(Gls)
2012–2016	Coritiba	21	(0)
2012	→ Canoas (loan)	9	(0)
2012	→ Chapecoense (loan)	0	(0)
2016	→ ABC (loan)	26	(0)
2016–2017	Feirense	25	(0)
2017–2020	Porto	4	(0)
2019–2020	→ Famalicão (loan)	17	(0)
2020–2021	Famalicão	6	(0)
2021–	Aris Limassol	156	(0)
- * Club domestic league appearances and goals as of 14 June 2026

Vanailson Luciano de Souza Alves (born 25 April 1991), commonly known as Vaná, is a Brazilian professional footballer who plays as goalkeeper for Cypriot First Division club Aris Limassol.

After starting his professional career at Coritiba, he spent several years in Portugal with Feirense, Porto and Famalicão. He made 52 Primeira Liga appearances and played a small role in Porto's league title in 2017–18.

== Career ==
=== Brazil ===
Born in Planaltina, Distrito Federal, Vaná was brought to Clube Atlético Paranaense in 2006. On his release in 2010, a former coach took him to Coritiba Foot Ball Club, where he was promoted to the first team in 2012.

Vaná was loaned to Canoas Sport Club in Rio Grande do Sul for the 2012 Campeonato Gaúcho and later that year joined Associação Chapecoense de Futebol on the same basis, being recalled to Coritiba due to their injury situation. He became known as "Vaneuer", a reference to German goalkeeper Manuel Neuer.

In the final of the 2015 Campeonato Paranaense, Vaná was blamed by the fans for both goals in a 2–0 first leg loss at Operário Ferroviário Esporte Clube, losing his place to Bruno Brigido thereafter. For 2016, he moved to ABC Futebol Clube in Natal, Rio Grande do Norte, where he won the Campeonato Potiguar and played a part in their promotion to the Campeonato Brasileiro Série B.

=== Feirense and Porto ===
Vaná moved to Portugal in 2016, signing for newly promoted Primeira Liga club C.D. Feirense. His performances in his only season at the Santa Maria da Feira-based club drew interest from S.L. Benfica, S.C. Braga – who bid €800,000 for him – and FC Porto, and he signed a four-year deal with the latter on 15 July 2017. He was back-up to Iker Casillas and made his debut on 12 May 2018 in the final game of the season away to Vitória S.C. with the title already secured (1–0 victory).

A year later, after the Spaniard suffered a heart attack, Vaná played the final three matches of the season, winning all of them as the title went to S.L. Benfica on the last day. He also played the 2019 Taça de Portugal Final on 25 May, a penalty shootout defeat to Sporting CP.

=== Famalicão ===
After the signing of Argentine Agustín Marchesín and promotion of youth player Diogo Costa, Vaná fell to third-choice goalkeeper at Porto and on 31 August 2019 he was loaned to fellow Primeira Liga team F.C. Famalicão for the season. Second choice to experienced compatriot Rafael Defendi, he made his debut on 30 October in a 2–1 home win over Gil Vicente FC. He played 23 total games for the club from Vila Nova de Famalicão, who fell short of a European place after a good start to the season.

On 2 October 2020, Vaná returned to Famalicão on a permanent transfer. He battled for a starting place against Russian Ivan Zlobin, and after a period of self-isolation due to COVID-19, the teenager Luiz Júnior.

=== Aris Limassol ===
Vaná left Portugal on 1 July 2021, when he joined newly promoted Cypriot First Division club Aris Limassol. He helped Aris finish 4th in the 2021–22 Cypriot First Division, and qualify for European football for the first time in the club's history. The following season, he helped them win the league for the first time ever, and was voted as the best goalkeeper of the league season. He also received the Best Save and Golden Gloves awards.

== Career statistics ==
As of match played 14 August 2025

Appearances and goals by club, season and competition
Club	Season	League			State league		National cup		League cup		Continental		Other		Total	
Club	Season	Division	Apps	Goals	Apps	Goals	Apps	Goals	Apps	Goals	Apps	Goals	Apps	Goals	Apps	Goals
Coritiba	2012	Série A	0	0	—		—		—		0	0	—		0	0
Coritiba	2013	Série A	2	0	1	0	1	0	—		1	0	—		5	0
Coritiba	2014	Série A	0	0	0	0	0	0	—		—		—		0	0
Coritiba	2015	Série A	1	0	17	0	3	0	—		—		—		21	0
Coritiba	Total		3	0	18	0	4	0	—		1	0	—		26	0
Canoas (loan)	2012	Gaúcho	—		9	0	—		—		—		—		9	0
Chapecoense (loan)	2012	Série C	0	0	—		—		—		—		—		0	0
ABC (loan)	2016	Série C	10	0	16	0	4	0	—		—		5	0	35	0
Farense	2016–17	Primeira Liga	25	0	—		1	0	3	0	—		—		29	0
Porto	2017–18	Primeira Liga	1	0	—		0	0	0	0	0	0	—		1	0
Porto	2018–19	Primeira Liga	3	0	—		1	0	5	0	0	0	0	0	9	0
Porto	Total		4	0	—		1	0	5	0	0	0	0	0	10	0
Famalicão (loan)	2019–20	Primeira Liga	17	0	—		6	0	0	0	—		—		23	0
Famalicão	2020–21	Primeira Liga	6	0	—		0	0	0	0	—		—		6	0
Aris Limassol	2021–22	Cypriot First Division	31	0	—		1	0	—		—		—		32	0
Aris Limassol	2022–23	Cypriot First Division	33	0	—		1	0	—		2	0	—		36	0
Aris Limassol	2023–24	Cypriot First Division	35	0	—		1	0	—		12	0	1	0	49	0
Aris Limassol	2024–25	Cypriot First Division	34	0	—		0	0	—		—		—		34	0
Aris Limassol	2025–26	Cypriot First Division	0	0	—		0	0	—		4	0	—		4	0
Aris Limassol	Total		133	0	—		3	0	—		18	0	1	0	155	0
Career total			198	0	43	0	19	0	8	0	19	0	6	0	293	0

== Honours ==
Coritiba

- Campeonato Paranaense: 2013

ABC

- Campeonato Potiguar: 2016

Porto

- Primeira Liga: 2017–18
- Supertaça Cândido de Oliveira: 2018

Aris Limassol

- Cypriot First Division: 2022–23
