= Fernando Almeida =

Brazilian footballer (born 1967)

Personal information
- Full name: Fernando da Silva Almeida
- Date of birth: 10 April 1967 (age 59)
- Place of birth: Goiás, Brazil
- Height: 1.74 m (5 ft 9 in)
- Position: Forward

Senior career*
Years	Team	Apps	(Gls)
–1993	Atlético Goianiense		
1994–2000	Salgueiros		
2000–2001	Maia		
2001–2003	Ermesinde		
2003–2004	Rio Tinto		
2004–2006	Ermesinde		
2006–2008	Guilhabreu		
2008–2010	Salgueiros 08		
- * Club domestic league appearances and goals

Fernando da Silva Almeida (born 10 April 1967) is a retired Brazilian football striker.
