= Vouzela =

- Municipality
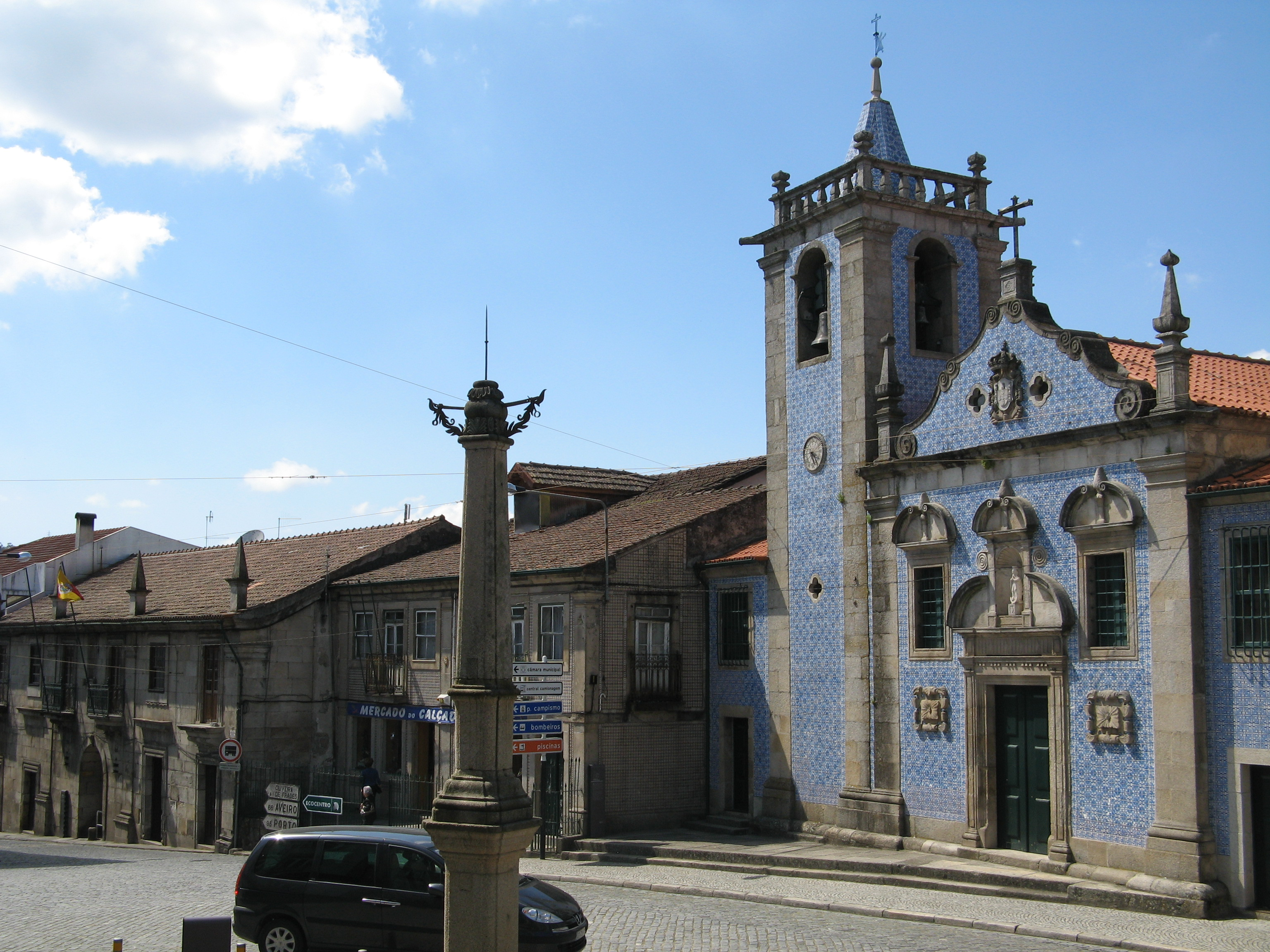
- Church of Mercy of Vouzela

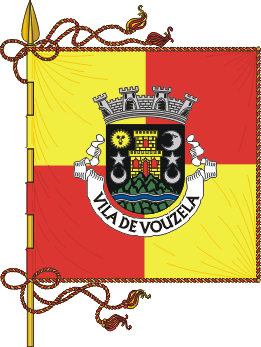
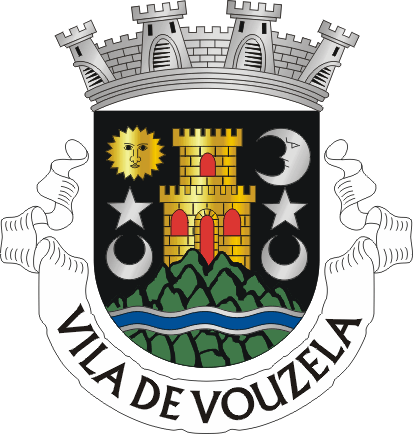
- Flag Coat of arms
- Interactive map of Vouzela
- Coordinates: 40°43′N 8°05′W
- Country: Portugal
- Region: Centro
- Intermunic. comm.: Viseu Dão Lafões
- District: Viseu
- Parishes: 9

Government
  - President: Rui Ladeira (PSD)

Area
  - Total: 193.69 km^{2} (74.78 sq mi)

Population (2011)
  - Total: 10,564
  - Density: 54.541/km^{2} (141.26/sq mi)
- Time zone: UTC+00:00 (WET)
  - Summer (DST): UTC+01:00 (WEST)
- Local holiday: May 14
- Website: http://www.cm-vouzela.pt/

Vouzela (Portuguese pronunciation: [voˈzɛlɐ]) is a municipality in the district Viseu in Portugal. The population in 2011 was 10,564, in an area of 193.69 km^{2}.

The present mayor is Rui Ladeira, elected by the Social Democratic Party. The municipal holiday is May 14.

== Parishes ==
Administratively, the municipality is divided into 9 civil parishes (freguesias):

- Alcofra
- Cambra e Carvalhal de Vermilhas
- Campia
- Fataunços e Figueiredo das Donas
- Fornelo do Monte
- Queirã
- São Miguel do Mato
- Ventosa
- Vouzela e Paços de Vilharigues

== Notable people ==
- Giles of Santarém (c.1185–1265) a Portuguese-Dominican scholar.
- João Ramalho (1493–1582) a Portuguese explorer and adventurer.
- Simão Rodrigues (1510–1579) a Portuguese-Jesuit priest and one of the co-founders of the Society of Jesus.
- Paulo Alexandre (1931–2024) a Portuguese singer.
- Luís Miguel Silva Tavares (born 1974) known as Luís Vouzela, a retired footballer with 510 club caps
