= Luís Miguel (footballer, born 1970) =

Portuguese footballer (born 1970)

Personal information
- Full name: Luís Miguel Moreira Silva
- Date of birth: 18 October 1971 (age 55)
- Place of birth: Espinho, Portugal
- Position: Forward

Youth career
- 1984–1987: Espinho
- 1987–1989: Boavista

Senior career*
Years	Team	Apps	(Gls)
1989–1990	Infesta	12	(0)
1990–1991	Arsenal Bessa		
1991–1992	Estarreja		
1992–1995	União de Lamas	42	(7)
1995–1998	Feirense	75	(17)
1998	Espinho	13	(2)
1999	Feirense	17	(7)
1999–2000	Paços de Ferreira	12	(1)
2000–2002	Ovarense	54	(4)
2002–2003	Feirense	26	(8)
2003–2004	Sanjoanense	32	(1)
2004–2005	Estarreja	23	(2)
2005–2006	Fornos de Algodres	1	(0)

Managerial career
- 2005–2006: Fornos de Algodres
- 2006: União de Lamas
- 2007–2008: Feirense
- 2011: Paços de Ferreira
- 2012–2013: Santa Clara
- * Club domestic league appearances and goals

Luís Miguel Moreira da Silva (born 18 October 1970), known as Luís Miguel, is a Portuguese football manager and former player.

He managed Paços de Ferreira in the Primeira Liga and Feirense and Santa Clara in the second tier. From 2013, he worked as an assistant to Vítor Pereira at clubs in several countries.

== Playing career ==
Born in Espinho, Luís Miguel played as a forward. He played as high as the second tier, in which he represented União de Lamas, Feirense, Espinho, Paços de Ferreira and Ovarense. He was part of the Paços side that won the 1999–2000 Segunda Liga.

== Managerial career ==
Luís Miguel was manager of Feirense's under-19 side and also took over the first team in the second tier in October 2007. He resigned on 24 February 2008 with the club in 11th, after accusing the club president of entering the changing room at half time to criticise the players. After two years in Qatar with the Aspire Academy, on 30 August 2011 he signed as manager of Paços de Ferreira until the end of the Primeira Liga season with the option of one more season, replacing Rui Vitória. His debut on 10 September was a 3–2 home loss to Sporting CP. On 27 November, after one win and a draw from his eight games, he left by mutual consent.

Luís Miguel was hired at second-tier club Santa Clara on 1 April 2012, with five games remaining of the season. After a 1–1 draw against União da Madeira on 23 January 2013, he reported opposing assistant manager António Romão to the police for alleged assault. On 3 May, with four games left of the season, he turned down a contract extension and said that he would leave at the end of the campaign.

Luís Miguel is the brother-in-law of fellow manager Vítor Pereira. From 2013, he worked as Pereira's assistant at Al-Ahli Saudi, Olympiacos, Fenerbahçe, 1860 Munich, Shanghai SIPG, Corinthians, Flamengo, Al Shabab, Wolverhampton Wanderers and Nottingham Forest.
