= Nail Beširović =

Bosnian footballer (born 1967)

Personal information
- Full name: Nail Beširović
- Date of birth: 22 July 1967 (age 59)
- Place of birth: Sarajevo, SR Bosnia and Herzegovina, SFR Yugoslavia
- Height: 1.69 m (5 ft 6 1/2 in)
- Position: Midfielder

Senior career*
Years	Team	Apps	(Gls)
1987–1991	Sloboda Tuzla	101	(9)
1992	Estrela Amadora	18	(1)
1992–1994	Académico Viseu	66	(7)
1994–1995	Académica Coimbra	27	(2)
1995–1997	Espinho	65	(6)
1997–2001	Farense	102	(3)
2001–2003	Leixões	55	(4)
2003–2004	GD Beira-Mar		
Total		434	(32)

International career
1998	Bosnia and Herzegovina	1	(0)
- * Club domestic league appearances and goals

Nail Beširović (born 22 July 1967) is a Bosnian retired footballer who played as a midfielder.

He spent the better part of his 16-year professional career in Portugal, representing six clubs.

== Club career ==
Born in Sarajevo, SR Bosnia and Herzegovina, Socialist Federal Republic of Yugoslavia, Beširović began his career with FK Sloboda Tuzla. In January 1992 he moved to Portugal, where he remained until the end of his playing days twelve years later.

In that country Beširović represented S.C. Espinho and S.C. Farense in the Primeira Liga, and C.F. Estrela da Amadora, Académico de Viseu FC, Académica de Coimbra and Espinho in the second division, amassing totals in the former competition of 134 games and seven goals over the course of five seasons. He retired at the age of nearly 37 after a spell with amateurs Grupo Desportivo Beira-Mar, in Monte Gordo (Vila Real do Santo António).

== International career ==
Beširović made one appearance for the Bosnia and Herzegovina national team, a June 1998 friendly match away against Macedonia in which he came on as a late substitute for Senad Repuh.

== Personal life ==
Beširević's son Dino Beširović was born in Viseu, Portugal and is also a professional footballer.
