= Idalécio =

Portuguese footballer

Personal information
- Full name: Idalécio Silvestre Lopes Soares Rosa
- Date of birth: 27 September 1973 (age 53)
- Place of birth: Loulé, Portugal
- Height: 1.96 m (6 ft 5 in)
- Position: Defender

Youth career
- 1990–1991: Louletano

Senior career*
Years	Team	Apps	(Gls)
1991–1992	Almancilense		
1992–1995	Louletano		
1995–1996	Farense	22	(3)
1996–2002	Braga	113	(5)
2002–2003	Nacional	28	(0)
2003–2006	Rio Ave	79	(2)
2006–2008	Trofense	33	(1)
2008	→ Gondomar (loan)	8	(0)
2008–2009	Louletano		
2009–2010	Farense		
2010–2011	Quarteirense		
- * Club domestic league appearances and goals

Idalécio Silvestre Lopes Soares Rosa (born 27 September 1973), known as Idalécio, is a Portuguese former professional footballer who played as a defender.

He played 11 seasons and 242 games in the Primeira Liga, mostly for Braga and Rio Ave and also for Nacional and Farense.

== Career ==
Idalécio made his professional debut in the Primeira Liga for Farense on 19 August 1995 as a starter in a 2–1 victory over Tirsense.
