= Carlos Manuel (footballer, born 1976) =

Portuguese footballer (born 1976)

Personal information
- Full name: Carlos Manuel Borges Sebastião
- Date of birth: September 5, 1976 (age 50)
- Place of birth: Portugal
- Position: Midfielder

Senior career*
Years	Team	Apps	(Gls)
1995–1998	Vitória de Setúbal	61	(10)
1998–2001	Porto	2	(0)
1999–2000	→ Vitória de Setúbal (loan)	14	(1)
2001	→ Leça (loan)	5	(0)
2001–2002	Oriental		
2002–2003	Sporting da Covilhã	5	(0)
2003	Amora	5	(0)
2004	Sesimbra		
- * Club domestic league appearances and goals

Carlos Manuel Borges Sebastião (born 5 September 1976) is a Portuguese former footballer.

== Early life ==
Manuel has been a supporter of Portuguese side Porto. He is a native of Sesimbra, Portugal.

== Career ==
Manuel started his career with Portuguese side Vitória de Setúbal. In 1998, he signed for Portuguese side Porto. In 1999, he returned to Portuguese side Vitória de Setúbal on loan. In 2001, he was sent on loan to Portuguese side Leça. After that, he signed for Portuguese side Oriental. In 2002, he signed for Portuguese side Sporting da Covilhã. In 2003, he signed for Portuguese side Amora. In 2004, he signed for Portuguese side Sesimbra.

== Style of play ==
Manuel operated as a midfielder. He mainly operated as an attacking midfielder.

== Personal life ==
Manuel has been married. After retiring from professional football, he worked as a civil servant.
