= Mundo Novo, Bahia =

Municipality of Bahia, Brazil

Coordinates: 11°51′32″S 40°28′19″W

- Municipality
- Flag Coat of arms
- Interactive map of Mundo Novo, Bahia
- Country: Brazil
- Region: Nordeste
- State: Bahia

Population (2020)
  - Total: 26,970
- Time zone: UTC−3 (BRT)

Mundo Novo, Bahia is a municipality in the state of Bahia in the North-East region of Brazil.

== See also ==
- List of municipalities in Bahia
