= 2020 Taça da Liga final =

- Event: 2019–20 Taça da Liga
Braga	Porto
1	0
- Date: 25 January 2020
- Venue: Estádio Municipal de Braga, Braga
- Man of the Match: Ricardo Horta
- Referee: Luís Godinho
- Attendance: 23,794

The 2020 Taça da Liga final was the final match of the 2019–20 Taça da Liga, the thirteenth season of the Taça da Liga. It was played on 25 January 2020 at Estádio Municipal de Braga.

The competition involved the 34 clubs playing in the top two tiers of the Portuguese football league system – 18 from Primeira Liga and 16 from LigaPro – during the 2019–20 season. Reserve sides of Primeira Liga teams that played in the 2018–19 LigaPro were excluded from the competition.

Braga and Porto faced off for the second time in a rematch of the 2013 final. In the final, Braga defeated Porto 1–0 to earn its second title in their third final. Braga became the third team (after Benfica and Sporting CP) in the competition's history to win multiple Taças da Liga. Porto lost their fourth consecutive league cup final, after appearances in the 2010, 2013, and 2019 finals.

== Background ==
For the third consecutive season, this competition featured a final four format with both the semi-finals and the final being played over a space of a few days in the same venue. The Estádio Municipal de Braga hosted all matches.

== Route to the final ==
Note: In all results below, the score of the finalist is given first (H: home; A: away).

Braga			Round	Porto		
Opponent	Result	Stadium	First round	Opponent	Result	Stadium
Bye			First round	Bye		
Opponent	Result	Stadium	Second round	Opponent	Result	Stadium
Bye			Second round	Bye		
Opponent	Result	Stadium	Third round	Opponent	Result	Stadium
Penafiel	3–1 (A)	Estádio Municipal 25 de Abril	Matchday 1	Santa Clara	1–0 (H)	Estádio do Dragão
Marítimo	2–1 (H)	Estádio Municipal de Braga	Matchday 2	Casa Pia	3–0 (A)	Estádio Pina Manique
Paços de Ferreira	4–1 (A)	Estádio Capital do Móvel	Matchday 3	Chaves	4–2 (A)	Estádio Municipal de Chaves
Group A winners: Team / Pld / W / D / L / GF / GA / GD / Pts; Braga / 3 / 3 / 0 / 0 / 8 / 2 / +6 / 9; Paços de Ferreira / 3 / 1 / 1 / 1 / 4 / 6 / -2 / 4; Marítimo / 3 / 0 / 2 / 1 / 2 / 3 / −1 / 2; Penafiel / 3 / 0 / 1 / 2 / 2 / 5 / −3 / 1			Final standings	Group D winners: Team / Pld / W / D / L / GF / GA / GD / Pts; Porto / 3 / 3 / 0 / 0 / 8 / 2 / +6 / 9; Chaves / 3 / 2 / 0 / 1 / 4 / 4 / 0 / 6; Casa Pia / 3 / 1 / 0 / 2 / 2 / 5 / –3 / 3; Santa Clara / 3 / 0 / 0 / 3 / 1 / 4 / −3 / 0		
Opponent	Result	Stadium	Knockout phase	Opponent	Result	Stadium
Sporting CP	2–1 (N)	Estádio Municipal de Braga	Semi-finals	Vitória de Guimarães	2–1 (N)	Estádio Municipal de Braga

== Match ==
=== Details ===
25 January 2020
19:45 WET (UTC±00:00)

Braga	1–0	Porto
R. Horta 90+5'	Report

Estádio Municipal de Braga, Braga
Attendance: 23,794
Referee: Luís Godinho

Braga	Porto

GK	1	(Brazil) Matheus
RB	47	(Portugal) Ricardo Esgaio
CB	3	(Brazil) Vítor Tormena		(substituted off) 56'
CB	34	(Brazil) Raul Silva	(yellow card) 67'
CB	36	(Brazil) Bruno Viana	(yellow card) 81'
LM	5	(Portugal) Nuno Sequeira
CM	60	(Portugal) João Palhinha	(yellow card) 64'	(substituted off) 90'
CM	27	(Portugal) Fransérgio (c)
RW	21	(Portugal) Ricardo Horta
LW	90	(Brazil) Galeno		(substituted off) 50'
CF	20	(Portugal) Paulinho
Substitutes:
GK	12	(Portugal) Tiago Sá
DF	11	(Portugal) Diogo Viana
DF	13	(Portugal) Wallace		(substituted on) 56'
MF	17	(Portugal) João Novais		(substituted on) 90'
FW	77	(Portugal) Francisco Trincão		(substituted on) 50'
FW	18	(Portugal) Rui Fonte
FW	7	(Angola) Wilson Eduardo
Manager:
(Portugal) Ruben Amorim

GK	31	(Portugal) Diogo Costa
RB	17	(Mexico) Jesús Corona	(yellow card) 73'
CB	19	(Democratic Republic of the Congo) Chancel Mbemba
CB	5	(Spain) Iván Marcano
LB	13	(Brazil) Alex Telles
CM	25	(Portugal) Otávio	(yellow card) 30'
CM	22	(Portugal) Danilo Pereira (c)		(substituted off) 74'
CM	27	(Portugal) Sérgio Oliveira	(yellow card) 19'	(substituted off) 72'
RW	11	(Mali) Moussa Marega		(substituted off) 78'
CF	29	(Brazil) Francisco Soares
LW	7	(Colombia) Luis Díaz
Substitutes:
GK	32	(Argentina) Agustín Marchesín
DF	18	(Portugal) Wilson Manafá		(substituted on) 78'
DF	4	(Portugal) Diogo Leite
MF	8	(Portugal) Romário Baró	(yellow card) 72'	(substituted on) 80'
MF	16	(Colombia) Mateus Uribe	(yellow card) 74'	(substituted on) 90+3'
MF	77	(Portugal) Vitinha
FW	9	(Cameroon) Vincent Aboubakar
Manager:
(Portugal) Sérgio Conceição

Man of the match

- (Portugal) Ricardo Horta

Assistant referees:
Rui Teixeira
Valter Rufo
Fourth official:
Cláudio Pereira
Video assistant referee:
Tiago Martins
Assistant video assistant referee:
Artur Soares Dias

Match rules

- 90 minutes.
- Penalty shoot-out if scores still level.
- Seven named substitutes.
- Maximum of three substitutions.

== See also ==
- 2019–20 FC Porto season
- 2019–20 S.C. Braga season
- 2020 Taça de Portugal final
