= 2019–20 Taça da Liga =

Allianz Cup

Tournament details
- Country: Portugal
- Dates: 27 July 2019 – 25 January 2020
- Teams: 34

Final positions
- Champions: Braga (2nd title)
- Runners-up: Porto

Tournament statistics
- Matches played: 45
- Goals scored: 106 (2.36 per match)
- Attendance: 192,830 (4,285 per match)
- Top goal scorer(s): Ricardo Horta; Soares (4 goals each)

The 2019–20 Taça da Liga was the thirteenth edition of the Taça da Liga (also known as Allianz Cup for sponsorship reasons), a football league cup competition organised by the Liga Portuguesa de Futebol Profissional and contested exclusively by clubs competing in the top two professional tiers of Portuguese football – the Primeira Liga and the LigaPro. It began on 27 July 2019 and concluded with the final in Braga on 25 January 2020, between Braga and Porto.

Sporting CP, who had won the previous two titles, were eliminated by Braga in the semi-finals. In a rematch of the 2013 final, Braga defeated Porto 1–0 to earn its second title. Porto lost their fourth consecutive league cup final, after appearances in the 2010, 2013, and 2019 finals.

== Format ==
Ten teams placed 4th–15th in the 2018–19 LigaPro (reserve teams from Primeira Liga clubs are excluded) and the two teams promoted to the 2019–20 LigaPro take part in the first round; one-legged ties with no extra-time were played between twelve teams.

In the second round, the six teams advancing from the previous round are joined by the fourteen teams placed 5th–18th in the 2018–19 Primeira Liga, by the three teams promoted to 2019–20 Primeira Liga and the team placed 3rd in the 2018–19 LigaPro. Again, one-legged ties with no extra-time were played between twenty-four teams.

The third round features the twelve teams advancing from the previous round and the four best-placed teams in the 2018–19 Primeira Liga. The sixteen teams were drawn into four groups that are contested in a single round-robin schedule, with each team playing at least one game at home.

The four group winners qualify for the knockout phase, which features single-legged ties, again with no extra-time being played. The semi-finals and final are played at a neutral venue, set to be in Braga until 2020.

Round	Teams entering in this round	Teams advancing from previous round
First round (12 teams)	10 teams ranked 4th–15th in the 2018–19 LigaPro; 2 teams promoted to the 2019–20 LigaPro	
Second round (24 teams)	14 teams ranked 5th–18th in the 2018–19 Primeira Liga; 1 team ranked 3rd in the 2018–19 LigaPro; 3 teams promoted to the 2019–20 Primeira Liga	6 winners from the first round
Third round (16 teams)	4 teams ranked 1st–4th in the 2018–19 Primeira Liga	12 winners from the second round
Semi-finals (4 teams)		4 group winners from the third round
Final (2 teams)		2 winners from the semi-finals

=== Tiebreakers ===
In the third round, teams are ranked according to points (3 points for a win, 1 point for a draw, 0 points for a loss). If two or more teams are tied on points on completion of the group matches, the following criteria are applied to determine the rankings:

1. highest goal difference in all group matches;
2. highest number of scored goals in all group matches;
3. lowest average age of all players fielded in all group matches (sum of the ages of all fielded players divided by the number of fielded players).

In all other rounds, teams tied at the end of regular time contest a penalty shootout to determine the winner. No extra-time is played.

== Teams ==
Thirty-four teams competing in the two professional tiers of Portuguese football for the 2019–20 season are eligible to participate in this competition. For teams that were either promoted or related, the final position in the previous league season determines in which round they enter the competition.

Third round (Primeira Liga)
Benfica (1st)	Porto (2nd)	Sporting CP (3rd)	Braga (4th)
Second round (Primeira Liga and LigaPro)
Vitória de Guimarães (5th)	Moreirense (6th)	Rio Ave (7th)	Boavista (8th)
Belenenses SAD (9th)	Santa Clara (10th)	Marítimo (11th)	Portimonense (12th)
Vitória de Setúbal (13th)	Aves (14th)	Tondela (15th)	Chaves (R1)
Nacional (R1)	Feirense (R1)	Paços de Ferreira (P1)	Famalicão (P1)
Gil Vicente (P1)	Estoril (3rd)		
First round (LigaPro)
Académica (5th)	Sporting da Covilhã (6th)	Leixões (7th)	Penafiel (8th)
Farense (10th)	Académico de Viseu (11th)	Oliveirense (12th)	Cova da Piedade (13th)
Mafra (14th)	Varzim (15th)	Casa Pia (P2)	Vilafranquense (P2)

Key

- Nth: League position in the 2018–19 season
- P1: Promoted to the Primeira Liga
- P2: Promoted to the LigaPro
- R1: Relegated to the LigaPro

== Schedule ==
Round		Draw date	Match date(s)	Teams	Fixtures
First round		5 July 2019	27–28 July 2019	34 → 28	6
Second round		5 July 2019	3 & 5 August 2019	28 → 16	12
Third round	Matchday 1	3 September 2019	25–26 September, 5 & 13 October, 16 November 2019	16 → 4	24
Third round	Matchday 2	3 September 2019	4–5 October, 7 October, 3–5 December 2019	16 → 4	24
Third round	Matchday 3	3 September 2019	21–22 December 2019	16 → 4	24
Final four	Semi-finals	3 September 2019	21–22 January 2020	4 → 2	2
Final four	Final	3 September 2019	25 January 2020	2 → 1	1

== First round ==
The twelve non-reserve teams competing in the 2019–20 LigaPro entered the competition in this round. Twelve teams were paired against each other for six single-legged ties. The draw took place on 5 July 2019, and the matches were played on 27 and 28 July 2019. Games tied at the end of regular time were decided by a penalty shootout with no extra-time being played. The first team drawn in each fixture played at home.

27 July 2019	Académica	1–1 (4–3 p)	Farense	Coimbra
20:30 WEST (UTC+01:00)	Reko 89'	Report	Vieira 78'	Stadium: Estádio Cidade de Coimbra; Attendance: 1,533; Referee: João Gonçalves
	Penalties
	Silva (penalty scored); Castro (penalty scored); Barnes (penalty scored); Cerqueira (penalty missed); Dani (penalty scored)		(penalty missed) Alvarinho; (penalty scored) Cássio; (penalty scored) Fabrício; (penalty scored) Bandarra; (penalty missed) Irobiso

28 July 2019	Casa Pia	0–0 (4–1 p)	Vilafranquense	Mafra (Note: The match was originally scheduled to be played in a temporary home stadium in Mafra, due to renovation works at Casa Pia's Estádio Pina Manique.)
16:00 WEST (UTC+01:00)		Report		Stadium: Parque Municipal de Mafra; Attendance: 391; Referee: Luís Máximo
	Penalties
	Kenidy (penalty scored); Coito (penalty scored); Roncatto (penalty scored); Rosa (penalty scored)		(penalty missed) Vieira; (penalty scored) Oliveira; (penalty missed) Grilo

28 July 2019	Leixões	0–0 (5–4 p)	Cova da Piedade	Matosinhos
16:00 WEST (UTC+01:00)		Report		Stadium: Estádio do Mar; Attendance: 1,210; Referee: Anzhony Rodrigues
	Penalties
	Zé Paulo (penalty scored); João Pedro (penalty scored); Bura (penalty scored); Poloni (penalty scored); Alan Júnior (penalty scored)		(penalty scored) Carvalhas; (penalty missed) Allef; (penalty scored) Marcos; (penalty scored) Zézinho; (penalty scored) Cele

28 July 2019	Oliveirense	2–1	Mafra	Vila Nova de Gaia (Note: The match was originally scheduled to be played in a temporary home stadium, Estádio Municipal de Aveiro, due to renovation works at Oliveirense's Estádio Carlos Osório. However, it was later decided it would be played in Vila Nova de Gaia.)
16:00 WEST (UTC+01:00)	Oliveira 15'; Marcos 41'	Report	Medeiros 60'	Stadium: Estádio Dr. Jorge Sampaio; Attendance: 364; Referee: Sérgio Guelho

28 July 2019	Penafiel	1–0	Académico de Viseu	Penafiel
16:00 WEST (UTC+01:00)	Pires 90'	Report		Stadium: Estádio Municipal 25 de Abril; Attendance: 501; Referee: André Castro

28 July 2019	Sporting da Covilhã	0–0 (3–1 p)	Varzim	Covilhã
18:00 WEST (UTC+01:00)		Report		Stadium: Estádio José dos Santos Pinto; Attendance: 455; Referee: Miguel Nogueira
	Penalties
	Martins (penalty scored); Silva (penalty missed); Castanheira (penalty scored); Bonani (penalty scored)		(penalty scored) Alan Henrique; (penalty missed) Luís Pedro; (penalty missed) Awurum; (penalty missed) Basse

== Second round ==
In the second round, the six first-round winners joined the fourteen teams ranked 5th–18th in the 2018–19 Primeira Liga, the team ranked 3rd in the 2018–19 LigaPro and the three teams promoted to the 2018–19 Primeira Liga. Twenty-four teams were paired against each other for twelve single-legged ties. The draw took place on 5 July 2019, and the matches were played on 3 and 5 August 2019. Games tied at the end of regular time were decided by a penalty shootout with no extra-time being played. The first team drawn in each fixture played at home.

3 August 2019	Casa Pia	2–0	Boavista	Mafra (Note: The match was originally scheduled to be played in a temporary home stadium in Mafra, due to renovation works at the Casa Pia's Estádio Pina Manique.)
16:00 WEST (UTC+01:00)	Maia 47'; Kenidy 83'	Report		Stadium: Parque Municipal de Mafra; Attendance: 436; Referee: Rui Oliveira

3 August 2019	Leixões	1–2	Marítimo	Matosinhos
16:00 WEST (UTC+01:00)	Harramiz 13'	Report	Correa 26'; Jhon Cley 45'	Stadium: Estádio do Mar; Attendance: 1,380; Referee: Artur Soares Dias

3 August 2019	Penafiel	1–0	Tondela	Penafiel
16:00 WEST (UTC+01:00)	Pires 73'	Report		Stadium: Estádio Municipal 25 de Abril; Attendance: 573; Referee: António Nobre

3 August 2019	Nacional	2–2 (3–4 p)	Chaves	Funchal
16:00 WEST (UTC+01:00)	Róchez 60', 77'	Report	Platiny 11'; André Luis 76'	Stadium: Estádio da Madeira; Attendance: 357; Referee: Manuel Mota
	Penalties
	Róchez (penalty scored); Perotti (penalty scored); Camacho (penalty missed); Gonçalves (penalty scored); Kalindi (penalty missed)		(penalty scored) André Luis; (penalty scored) Jean Filipe; (penalty scored) Teixeira; (penalty missed) Platiny; (penalty scored) Gamboa

3 August 2019	Vitória de Setúbal	1–0	Moreirense	Setúbal
16:00 WEST (UTC+01:00)	Artur Jorge 69'	Report		Stadium: Estádio do Bonfim; Attendance: 3,341; Referee: João Bento

3 August 2019	Belenenses SAD	0–1	Santa Clara	Oeiras
17:00 WEST (UTC+01:00)		Report	Rashid 81'	Stadium: Estádio Nacional; Attendance: 1,107; Referee: Gustavo Correia

3 August 2019	Famalicão	0–2	Sporting da Covilhã	Vila Nova de Famalicão
18:00 WEST (UTC+01:00)		Report	Jean Batista 29'; Silva 33'	Stadium: Estádio Municipal de Famalicão; Attendance: 3,022; Referee: Cláudio Pereira

3 August 2019	Gil Vicente	3–2	Aves	Vila das Aves (Note: The match was originally scheduled to be played in Gil Vicente's home stadium, Estádio Cidade de Barcelos. However, due to renovation works, it was later decided it would be hosted by Aves.)
18:00 WEST (UTC+01:00)	Lima 63'; Lourency 72'; Kraev 90'	Report	Welinton 53'; Peu 71'	Stadium: Estádio do Aves; Attendance: 1,271; Referee: Iancu Vasilica

3 August 2019	Paços de Ferreira	1–1 (5–4 p)	Estoril	Paços de Ferreira
18:00 WEST (UTC+01:00)	Micael 31'	Report	Roberto 79'	Stadium: Estádio Capital do Móvel; Attendance: 1,192; Referee: Vítor Ferreira
	Penalties
	Pedrinho (penalty scored); Baixinho (penalty scored); Teles (penalty scored); Almeida (penalty scored); Leão (penalty scored)		(penalty scored) Roberto; (penalty scored) Juninho; (penalty missed) Belima; (penalty scored) Franco; (penalty scored) Crespo

3 August 2019	Portimonense	2–0	Académica	Portimão
18:00 WEST (UTC+01:00)	Paulinho 18'; Boa Morte 45+2'	Report		Stadium: Estádio Municipal de Portimão; Attendance: 1,985; Referee: Manuel Oliveira

3 August 2019	Rio Ave	6–1	Oliveirense	Vila do Conde
18:00 WEST (UTC+01:00)	N. Santos 27', 57'; Filipe Augusto 31'; Lopes 42'; Taremi 70'; Tarantini 87'	Report	Bouldini 68'	Stadium: Estádio dos Arcos; Attendance: 1,551; Referee: Hélder Malheiro

5 August 2019	Feirense	0–1	Vitória de Guimarães	Santa Maria da Feira
19:45 WEST (UTC+01:00)		Report	Bondarenko 10'	Stadium: Estádio Marcolino de Castro; Attendance: 2,232; Referee: Carlos Xistra

== Third round ==
In the third round, the twelve second-round winners joined the four top-ranked teams from the 2018–19 Primeira Liga: Benfica (1st), Porto (2nd), Sporting CP (3rd) and Braga (4th). These sixteen teams were drawn into four groups of four, each group containing one of the four top-ranked Primeira Liga teams. Group matches were played in a single round-robin schedule, ensuring that each team played at least one match at home.

For the draw, the teams were seeded into four pots based on their league position in the previous season, with the teams participating in the 2018–19 Primeira Liga being seeded higher regardless of any relegation. The draw took place on 3 September 2019, and the matches were played between 25 September and 21 December 2019. The fixtures and match dates were decided by an additional draw.

=== Group A ===
Pos	Team	Pld	W	D	L	GF	GA	GD	Pts	Qualification	BRA	PAÇ	MAR	PEN
1	Braga	3	3	0	0	9	3	+6	9	Advance to knockout phase	—	—	2–1	—
2	Paços de Ferreira	3	1	1	1	4	6	−2	4		1–4	—	1–1	—
3	Marítimo	3	0	2	1	2	3	−1	2		—	—	—	0–0
4	Penafiel	3	0	1	2	2	5	−3	1		1–3	1–2	—	—

Source: Liga Portugal
Rules for classification: Tiebreakers

5 October 2019	Paços de Ferreira	1–1	Marítimo	Paços de Ferreira
16:00 WEST (UTC+01:00)	Murilo 18'	Report	Correa 76'	Stadium: Estádio Capital do Móvel; Attendance: 975; Referee: Manuel Mota

7 October 2019	Penafiel	1–3	Braga	Penafiel
16:00 WEST (UTC+01:00)	Schons 72'	Report	Fonte 2'; Pablo 17'; R. Horta 67'	Stadium: Estádio Municipal 25 de Abril; Attendance: 1,103; Referee: Cláudio Pereira

13 October 2019	Braga	2–1	Marítimo	Braga
15:00 WEST (UTC+01:00)	A. Horta 10'; Paulinho 34'	Report	Bambock 66'	Stadium: Estádio Municipal de Braga; Attendance: 5,041; Referee: Nuno Almeida

13 October 2019	Penafiel	1–2	Paços de Ferreira	Penafiel
16:00 WEST (UTC+01:00)	Yuri 17'	Report	Murilo 49' (pen.); Welthon 83' (pen.)	Stadium: Estádio Municipal 25 de Abril; Attendance: 522; Referee: Iancu Vasilica

21 December 2019	Marítimo	0–0	Penafiel	Funchal
15:00 WET (UTC±00:00)		Report		Stadium: Estádio do Marítimo; Attendance: 1,586; Referee: Iancu Vasilica

22 December 2019	Paços de Ferreira	1–4	Braga	Paços de Ferreira
17:00 WET (UTC±00:00)	Douglas Tanque 1'	Report	Fransérgio 44'; Palhinha 51'; R. Horta 71'; Eduardo 75' (pen.)	Stadium: Estádio Capital do Móvel; Attendance: 2,472; Referee: Luís Godinho

=== Group B ===
Pos	Team	Pld	W	D	L	GF	GA	GD	Pts	Qualification	GUI	BEN	SET	SCC
1	Vitória de Guimarães	3	2	1	0	5	0	+5	7	Advance to knockout phase	—	—	—	3–0
2	Benfica	3	0	3	0	3	3	0	3		0–0	—	—	—
3	Vitória de Setúbal	3	0	2	1	3	5	−2	2		0–2	2–2	—	—
4	Sporting da Covilhã	3	0	2	1	2	5	−3	2		—	1–1	1–1	—

Source: Liga Portugal
Rules for classification: Tiebreakers

25 September 2019	Benfica	0–0	Vitória de Guimarães	Lisbon
19:00 WEST (UTC+01:00)		Report		Stadium: Estádio da Luz; Attendance: 37,507; Referee: Rui Costa

5 October 2019	Sporting da Covilhã	1–1	Vitória de Setúbal	Covilhã
16:00 WEST (UTC+01:00)	Silva 90+2'	Report	Moreira 36' (o.g.)	Stadium: Estádio José dos Santos Pinto; Attendance: 1,014; Referee: Gustavo Correia

3 December 2019	Sporting da Covilhã	1–1	Benfica	Covilhã
20:15 WET (UTC±00:00)	Bonani 46'	Report	Jota 82'	Stadium: Estádio José dos Santos Pinto; Attendance: 2,678; Referee: Rui Oliveira

4 December 2019	Vitória de Setúbal	0–2	Vitória de Guimarães	Setúbal
18:45 WET (UTC±00:00)		Report	Bonatini 31', 37'	Stadium: Estádio do Bonfim; Attendance: 1,736; Referee: Fábio Veríssimo

21 December 2019	Vitória de Guimarães	3–0	Sporting da Covilhã	Guimarães
20:00 WET (UTC±00:00)	Davidson 65', 86'; Bonatini 72'	Report		Stadium: Estádio D. Afonso Henriques; Attendance: 7,191; Referee: Rui Costa

21 December 2019	Vitória de Setúbal	2–2	Benfica	Setúbal
20:00 WET (UTC±00:00)	Guedes 83', 90+2'	Report	De Tomás 49'; Jota 73'	Stadium: Estádio do Bonfim; Attendance: 4,084; Referee: Manuel Oliveira

=== Group C ===
Pos	Team	Pld	W	D	L	GF	GA	GD	Pts	Qualification	SPO	RAV	PTM	GIL
1	Sporting CP	3	2	0	1	7	4	+3	6	Advance to knockout phase	—	1–2	—	—
2	Rio Ave	3	1	1	1	3	3	0	4		—	—	—	0–1
3	Portimonense	3	1	1	1	5	6	−1	4		2–4	1–1	—	—
4	Gil Vicente	3	1	0	2	2	4	−2	3		0–2	—	1–2	—

Source: Liga Portugal
Rules for classification: Tiebreakers

25 September 2019	Gil Vicente	1–2	Portimonense	Barcelos
17:00 WEST (UTC+01:00)	Villa 56'	Report	Hackman 45'; Rocha 90+5'	Stadium: Estádio Cidade de Barcelos; Attendance: 765; Referee: Carlos Xistra

26 September 2019	Sporting CP	1–2	Rio Ave	Lisbon
20:00 WEST (UTC+01:00)	Fernandes 35'	Report	Ronan 32'; Piazon 83'	Stadium: Estádio José Alvalade; Attendance: 12,656; Referee: Manuel Mota

5 October 2019	Portimonense	1–1	Rio Ave	Portimão
20:30 WEST (UTC+01:00)	Taremi 48' (o.g.)	Report	Moreira 33'	Stadium: Estádio Municipal de Portimão; Attendance: 1,956; Referee: Fábio Veríssimo

4 December 2019	Gil Vicente	0–2	Sporting CP	Barcelos
20:45 WET (UTC±00:00)		Report	Fernandes 89'; Vietto 90+4'	Stadium: Estádio Cidade de Barcelos; Attendance: 3,202; Referee: Rui Costa

21 December 2019	Portimonense	2–4	Sporting CP	Portimão
17:00 WET (UTC±00:00)	Martínez 16' (pen.); Mathieu 31' (o.g.)	Report	Vietto 37'; Camacho 77'; Plata 84'; Luiz Phellype 90+5'	Stadium: Estádio Municipal de Portimão; Attendance: 3,499; Referee: João Pinheiro

21 December 2019	Rio Ave	0–1	Gil Vicente	Vila do Conde
17:00 WET (UTC±00:00)		Report	Lima 90+5' (pen.)	Stadium: Estádio dos Arcos; Attendance: 1.564; Referee: André Narciso

=== Group D ===
Pos	Team	Pld	W	D	L	GF	GA	GD	Pts	Qualification	POR	CHA	CAS	STC
1	Porto	3	3	0	0	8	2	+6	9	Advance to knockout phase	—	—	—	1–0
2	Chaves	3	2	0	1	4	4	0	6		2–4	—	—	1–0
3	Casa Pia	3	1	0	2	2	5	−3	3		0–3	0–1	—	—
4	Santa Clara	3	0	0	3	1	4	−3	0		—	—	1–2	—

Source: Liga Portugal
Rules for classification: Tiebreakers

25 September 2019	Porto	1–0	Santa Clara	Porto
21:00 WEST (UTC+01:00)	Leite 45+1'	Report		Stadium: Estádio do Dragão; Attendance: 25,004; Referee: António Nobre

4 October 2019	Chaves	1–0	Santa Clara	Chaves
16:00 WEST (UTC+01:00)	Wágner 51' (pen.)	Report		Stadium: Estádio Municipal de Chaves; Attendance: 1,164; Referee: André Narciso

16 November 2019	Casa Pia	0–1	Chaves	Lisbon
15:00 WEST (UTC±00:00)		Report	Paredes 36'	Stadium: Estádio Pina Manique; Attendance: 353; Referee: Cláudio Pereira

5 December 2019	Casa Pia	0–3	Porto	Lisbon
20:15 WET (UTC±00:00)		Report	Saravia 50'; Díaz 69'; Soares 72'	Stadium: Estádio Pina Manique; Attendance: 1,254; Referee: Vítor Ferreira

22 December 2019	Santa Clara	1–2	Casa Pia	Ponta Delgada
14:00 AZOT (UTC−01:00)	João Afonso 90+3'	Report	Kenidy 77'; Fonseca 90+4'	Stadium: Estádio de São Miguel; Attendance: 379; Referee: Hélder Malheiro

22 December 2019	Chaves	2–4	Porto	Chaves
19:15 WET (UTC±00:00)	Platiny 79'; André Luis 84'	Report	Soares 8', 16'; Marega 26'; Díaz 80'	Stadium: Estádio Municipal de Chaves; Attendance: 5,276; Referee: Carlos Xistra

== Knockout phase ==
The knockout phase was contested as a final-four tournament by the four third-round group winners in one-legged semi-finals and final. All matches were played in a single venue, decided before the competition starts. As in the first and second round, games tied at the end of regular time were decided by a penalty shootout with no extra-time being played.

The first semi-final was played between the winners of Groups A (Braga) and C (Sporting CP), while the second between Group B (Vitória de Guimarães) and D (Porto) winners. Groups A and B winners (Braga and Vitória de Guimarães, respectively) were designated as the "home" teams (for administrative purposes) in their semi-final clashes as was the winner of the first semi-final in the final. If the team that played at home in the appointed neutral stadium was still in competition, in this case Braga, they would be designated the home team regardless of which group or semi-final they played.

All matches were played at Estádio Municipal de Braga, in Braga, with the semi-finals played on 21 and 22 January, and the final on 25 January 2020.

Semi-finals
21 January – Estádio Municipal de Braga
Braga	2
Sporting CP	1
22 January – Estádio Municipal de Braga
Vitória de Guimarães	1
Porto	2

Final
25 January – Estádio Municipal de Braga
Braga	1
Porto	0

=== Semi-finals ===
21 January 2020
19:45 WET (UTC±00:00)

Braga	2–1	Sporting CP
R. Horta 8'; Paulinho 90'	Report	Mathieu 44'

Estádio Municipal de Braga, Braga
Attendance: 10,047
Referee: Nuno Almeida

22 January 2020
19:45 WET (UTC±00:00)

Vitória de Guimarães	1–2	Porto
Tapsoba 65' (pen.)	Report	Telles 66'; Soares 75'

Estádio Municipal de Braga, Braga
Attendance: 13,107
Referee: Jorge Sousa

=== Final ===
25 January 2020
19:45 WET (UTC±00:00)

Braga	1–0	Porto
R. Horta 90+5'	Report

Estádio Municipal de Braga, Braga
Attendance: 23,794
Referee: Luís Godinho
