= Rafael van der Laan =

Portuguese footballer

Personal information
- Full name: Rafael van der Laan Teixeira Miranda
- Date of birth: 8 June 1999 (age 27)
- Place of birth: Lisbon, Portugal
- Height: 1.94 m (6 ft 4 in)
- Position: Goalkeeper

Team information
- Current team: Casa Pia
- Number: 99

Youth career
- 2007–2010: 9 Abril Trajouce
- 2010–2018: Sporting
- 2018–2019: Estoril Praia

Senior career*
Years	Team	Apps	(Gls)
2019–	Casa Pia	20	(0)
2021	→ Real (loan)	8	(0)
- * Club domestic league appearances and goals as of 30 May 2021

Rafael van der Laan Teixeira Miranda (born 8 June 1999) is a Portuguese footballer who plays for Casa Pia as a goalkeeper.

== Football career ==
He made his professional debut for Casa Pia on 5 December 2019 in the Taça da Liga.
