= 2019–20 FC Porto season =

Porto
2019–20 season
- President: Jorge Nuno Pinto da Costa
- Head coach: Sérgio Conceição
- Stadium: Estádio do Dragão
- Primeira Liga: 1st
- Taça de Portugal: Winners
- Taça da Liga: Runners-up
- UEFA Champions League: Third qualifying round
- UEFA Europa League: Round of 32
- Top goalscorer: League: Moussa Marega (12 goals); All: Soares (19 goals)
- Highest home attendance: 49,227; Porto 3–2 Benfica (8 February 2020)
- Lowest home attendance: 10,661; Porto 1–0 Santa Clara (19 December 2019)
- Average home league attendance: 35,625
Home colours	Away colours	Third colours

The 2019–20 season was Futebol Clube do Porto's 110th competitive season and 86th consecutive season in the top flight of Portuguese football. It started with the UEFA Champions League third qualifying round on 7 August 2019 and concluded with the Taça de Portugal final against Benfica on 1 August 2020.

Porto won the 2019–20 Primeira Liga with two matches remaining, following a 2–0 home win against Sporting CP, and thus became Portuguese champions for the 29th time in their history.

== Players ==
=== Squad information ===
N	Pos.	Nat.	Name	Age	EU	Since	App	Goals	Ends	Transfer fee	Notes
2	DF	(Portugal)	Tomás Esteves	17	EU	2019	3	0	2024	Youth system	
3	DF	(Portugal)	Pepe	36	EU	2019	58	3	2021	Free	
4	DF	(Portugal)	Diogo Leite	20	EU	2018	24	2	2023	Youth system	
5	DF	(Spain)	Iván Marcano	32	EU	2019	36	6	2023	€3M	
7	FW	(Colombia)	Luis Díaz	22	Non-EU	2019	50	14	2024	€7M	
8	MF	(Portugal)	Romário Baró	19	EU	2019	17	0	2023	Youth system	
9	FW	(Cameroon)	Vincent Aboubakar	27	Non-EU	2014	119	58	2021	€11.2M	
10	FW	(Japan)	Shoya Nakajima	24	Non-EU	2019	27	1	2024	€12M	
11	FW	(Mali)	Moussa Marega	28	Non-EU	2016	145	59	2021	€3.8M	
13	DF	(Brazil)	Alex Telles	26	Non-EU	2016	193	21	2021	€6.5M	Second nationality: Italy
15	MF	(Senegal)	Mamadou Loum	22	Non-EU	2019	14	1	2022	€7.5M	
16	MF	(Colombia)	Mateus Uribe	28	Non-EU	2019	41	1	2023	€9M	
17	FW	(Mexico)	Jesús Corona	26	Non-EU	2015	220	28	2022	€10.5M	
18	DF	(Portugal)	Wilson Manafá	25	EU	2019	62	2	2023	Undisclosed	
19	DF	(Democratic Republic of the Congo)	Chancel Mbemba	24	Non-EU	2018	48	5	2022	€4.5M	
20	FW	(Cape Verde)	Zé Luís	28	Non-EU	2019	31	10	2023	€8.5M	
22	MF	(Portugal)	Danilo Pereira	27	EU	2015	197	19	2022	€4.5M	Captain
25	MF	(Brazil)	Otávio	24	Non-EU	2014	140	13	2021	€2.5M	
27	MF	(Portugal)	Sérgio Oliveira	27	EU	2015	101	14	2021	€1M	
29	FW	(Brazil)	Soares	28	Non-EU	2017	131	63	2021	€5.6M	
31	GK	(Portugal)	Diogo Costa	19	EU	2018	15	0	2022	Youth system	
32	GK	(Argentina)	Agustín Marchesín	31	Non-EU	2019	41	0	2023	€7.5M	
49	FW	(Portugal)	Fábio Silva	17	EU	2019	20	3	2022	Youth system	
50	MF	(Portugal)	Fábio Vieira	19	EU	2020	8	2	2022	Youth system	
51	GK	(Senegal)	Mouhamed Mbaye	21	Non-EU	2019	1	0	2021	Youth system	
57	MF	(Portugal)	João Mário	19	EU	2020	2	0	2022	Youth system	
71	GK	(Portugal)	Francisco Meixedo	18	EU	2020	0	0	2021	Youth system	
77	MF	(Portugal)	Vítor Ferreira	19	EU	2020	12	0	2024	Youth system	

- Last updated: 1 August 2020
- Source: FC Porto
- Ordered by squad number.

=== Transfers and loans ===
==== In ====
Date	Pos.	Name	Nationality	Age	Transferred from	Window	Until	Fee	Ref.
8 June 2019	DF	Renzo Saravia	Argentina	25	Racing Club (Argentina)	Summer	2023	€5.5M	
1 July 2019	MF	Mamadou Loum	Senegal	22	Braga (Portugal)	Summer	2022	€7.5M	
5 July 2019	FW	Shoya Nakajima	Japan	24	Al-Duhail (Qatar)	Summer	2024	€12M	
5 July 2019	FW	Zé Luís	Cape Verde	28	Spartak Moscow (Russia)	Summer	2023	€8.5M	
10 July 2019	FW	Luis Díaz	Colombia	22	Atlético Junior (Colombia)	Summer	2024	€7M	
11 July 2019	DF	Iván Marcano	Spain	32	Roma (Italy)	Summer	2023	€3M	
2 August 2019	GK	Agustín Marchesín	Argentina	31	América (Mexico)	Summer	2023	€7.5M	
5 August 2019	MF	Mateus Uribe	Colombia	28	América (Mexico)	Summer	2023	€9M	

Total expending: ▼€60 million

==== Out ====
Date	Pos.	Name	Nationality	Age	Transferred to	Window	Fee	Ref.
14 March 2019	DF	Éder Militão	Brazil	21	Real Madrid (Spain)	Summer	€50M	
15 May 2019	GK	José Sá	Portugal	26	Olympiacos (Greece)	Summer	€2.5M	
28 May 2019	DF	Felipe	Brazil	30	Atlético Madrid (Spain)	Summer	€20M	
1 July 2019	GK	Fabiano	Brazil	31	Unattached	Summer	Free	
1 July 2019	DF	Maxi Pereira	Uruguay	35	Unattached	Summer	Free	
1 July 2019	FW	Adrián López	Spain	31	Osasuna (Spain)	Summer	Free	
1 July 2019	FW	Yacine Brahimi	Algeria	29	Al-Rayyan (Qatar)	Summer	Free	
2 July 2019	FW	Hernâni	Portugal	27	Levante (Spain)	Summer	Free	
3 July 2019	MF	Héctor Herrera	Mexico	29	Atlético Madrid (Spain)	Summer	Free	
15 July 2019	MF	Óliver Torres	Spain	24	Sevilla (Spain)	Summer	€12M	
18 July 2019	MF	Mikel Agu	Nigeria	26	Vitória de Guimarães (Portugal)	Summer	Free	
6 August 2019	MF	Galeno	Brazil	21	Braga (Portugal)	Summer	€3.5M	
14 August 2019	GK	João Costa	Portugal	23	Mirandés (Spain)	Summer	Free	
10 January 2020	MF	Bruno Costa	Portugal	22	Portimonense (Portugal)	Winter	Undisclosed	

Total income: ▲€88 million

==== Loan return ====
Date	Pos.	Name	Nationality	Age	Returned from	Window
1 July 2019	GK	João Costa	Portugal	23	Cartagena (Spain)	Summer
1 July 2019	DF	Chidozie Awaziem	Nigeria	22	Çaykur Rizespor (Turkey)	Summer
1 July 2019	DF	Jorge Fernandes	Portugal	22	Tondela (Portugal)	Summer
1 July 2019	DF	Saidy Janko	Switzerland	23	Nottingham Forest (England)	Summer
1 July 2019	DF	Yordan Osorio	Venezuela	25	Vitória de Guimarães (Portugal)	Summer
1 July 2019	MF	Mikel Agu	Nigeria	26	Vitória de Setúbal (Portugal)	Summer
1 July 2019	MF	Sérgio Oliveira	Portugal	27	PAOK (Greece)	Summer
1 July 2019	FW	Majeed Waris	Ghana	27	Nantes (France)	Summer
1 July 2019	FW	Galeno	Brazil	21	Rio Ave (Portugal)	Summer

==== Loan out ====
Date	Pos.	Name	Nationality	Age	Loaned to	Window	Until	Ref.
14 June 2019	DF	Jorge Fernandes	Portugal	22	Kasımpaşa (Turkey)	Summer	30 June 2020	
1 July 2019	DF	Saidy Janko	Switzerland	23	Young Boys (Switzerland)	Summer	30 June 2020	
19 July 2019	FW	André Pereira	Portugal	24	Vitória de Guimarães (Portugal)	Summer	30 June 2020	
30 July 2019	DF	João Pedro	Brazil	22	Bahia (Brazil)	Summer	31 December 2020	
9 August 2019	FW	Fernando Andrade	Brazil	26	Sivasspor (Turkey)	Summer	30 June 2020	
15 August 2019	DF	Chidozie Awaziem	Nigeria	22	Leganés (Spain)	Summer	30 June 2020	
27 August 2019	DF	Diogo Queirós	Portugal	20	Mouscron (Belgium)	Summer	30 June 2020	
31 August 2019	GK	Vaná	Brazil	28	Famalicão (Portugal)	Summer	30 June 2020	
31 August 2019	DF	Yordan Osorio	Venezuela	25	Zenit Saint Petersburg (Russia)	Summer	30 June 2020	
28 February 2020	DF	Renzo Saravia	Argentina	26	Internacional (Brazil)	Winter	30 June 2020	

== Technical staff ==
Position	Staff
Head coach	(Portugal) Sérgio Conceição
Assistant coaches	(Portugal) Vítor Bruno
Assistant coaches	(France) Siramana Dembélé
Goalkeeper coach	(Portugal) Diamantino Figueiredo
Exercise Physiologist	(Portugal) Eduardo Oliveira

Last updated: 15 July 2019
Source: FC Porto

== Pre-season and friendlies ==
Win Draw Loss

6 July 2019 Friendly	Porto	6–0	Águeda	Olival, Portugal
10:00 WEST	Manafá 10'; Silva 23'; Corona 50', 55', 78'; Soares 58'			Stadium: CTFD PortoGaia

10 July 2019 Friendly	Porto	4–0	Varzim	Olival, Portugal
10:00 WEST	Soares 53', 81'; Nakajima 60'; Óliver 63'			Stadium: CTFD PortoGaia

13 July 2019 Friendly	Porto	1–0	Penafiel	Olival, Portugal
11:00 WEST	Marcano 89'			Stadium: CTFD PortoGaia

16 July 2019 Friendly	Porto	1–0	Fulham	Albufeira, Portugal
20:30 WEST	Otávio 30'			Stadium: Estádio Municipal de Albufeira; Referee: Tiago Martins

19 July 2019 Copa Ibérica	Porto	1–1 (5–4 p)	Betis	Portimão, Portugal
20:30 WEST	Zé Luís 31'		Juanmi 13'	Stadium: Estádio Municipal de Portimão; Referee: António Nobre
	Penalties
	Telles (penalty scored); Soares (penalty scored); Marcano (penalty scored); B. Costa (penalty scored); Pereira (penalty scored)		Joaquín (penalty scored); Boudebouz (penalty scored); Abreu (penalty scored); Bartra (penalty missed); Barragán (penalty scored)

21 July 2019 Copa Ibérica	Porto	2–1	Getafe	Portimão, Portugal
20:30 WEST	Pepe 52'; Silva 81'		Cabrera 39'	Stadium: Estádio Municipal de Portimão; Referee: Quitério Almeida

24 July 2019 Friendly	Porto	4–2	Farense	Lagos, Portugal
	Fernando 27'; Silva 35'; Nakajima 70'; Queta 72'			Stadium: Municipal de Lagos

27 July 2019 Presentation	Porto	0–1	Monaco	Porto, Portugal
19:00 WEST			Martins 23'	Stadium: Estádio do Dragão; Attendance: 45,217

31 July 2019 Friendly	Porto	1–0	Braga	Olival, Portugal
	Corona 89'			Stadium: CTFD PortoGaia

31 July 2019 Friendly	Porto	6–2	Porto B	Olival, Portugal
	Fernando 13'; Díaz 16', 83'; Soares 76'; Aboubakar 84'; Pereira 89'		Djim 9'; Borges 60'	Stadium: CTFD PortoGaia

== Competitions ==
=== Overall record ===
Competition	First match	Last match	Starting round	Final position	Record							
Competition	First match	Last match	Starting round	Final position	Pld	W	D	L	GF	GA	GD	Win %
Primeira Liga	10 August 2019	26 July 2020	Matchday 1	Winners	34	26	4	4	74	22	+52	76.47
Taça de Portugal	19 October 2019	1 August 2020	Third round	Winners	7	6	1	0	18	3	+15	85.71
Taça da Liga	25 September 2019	25 January 2020	Group stage	Runners-up	5	4	0	1	10	4	+6	80.00
UEFA Champions League	7 August 2019	13 August 2019	Third qualifying round	Third qualifying round	2	1	0	1	3	3	+0	50.00
UEFA Europa League	19 September 2019	27 February 2020	Group stage	Round of 32	8	3	1	4	10	14	−4	37.50
Total					56	40	6	10	115	46	+69	71.43

Last updated: 1 August 2020
Source: Competitions

=== Primeira Liga ===
==== League table ====
Pos	Team	Pld	W	D	L	GF	GA	GD	Pts	Qualification or relegation
1	Porto (C)	34	26	4	4	74	22	+52	82	Qualification for the Champions League group stage
2	Benfica	34	24	5	5	71	26	+45	77	Qualification for the Champions League third qualifying round
3	Braga	34	18	6	10	61	40	+21	60 (Note: Head-to-head away goals: Braga 1, Sporting 0)	Qualification for the Europa League group stage (Note: Since the winners of the 2019–20 Taça de Portugal, Porto, qualified for the Champions League based on league position, the spot awarded to the third-placed team (Europa League third qualifying round) was passed to the fourth-placed team, and the spot awarded to the fourth-placed team (Europa League second qualifying round) was passed to the fifth-placed team.)
4	Sporting CP	34	18	6	10	49	34	+15	60	Qualification for the Europa League third qualifying round
5	Rio Ave	34	15	10	9	48	36	+12	55	Qualification for the Europa League second qualifying round

Source: Liga Portugal
Rules for classification: 1) Points; 2) Head-to-head points; 3) Head-to-head goal difference; 4) Head-to-head away goals scored; 5) Goal difference; 6) Matches won; 7) Goals scored; 8) Play-off.
(C) Champions

==== Results summary ====
Overall								Home						Away					
Pld	W	D	L	GF	GA	GD	Pts	W	D	L	GF	GA	GD	W	D	L	GF	GA	GD
34	26	4	4	74	22	+52	82	15	1	1	44	7	+37	11	3	3	30	15	+15

Last updated: 25 July 2020.
Source: Liga Portugal

==== Results by round ====
Round	1	2	3	4	5	6	7	8	9	10	11	12	13	14	15	16	17	18	19	20	21	22	23	24	25	26	27	28	29	30	31	32	33	34
Ground	A	H	A	H	A	H	A	H	A	H	A	H	A	H	A	A	H	H	A	H	A	H	A	H	A	H	A	H	A	H	A	H	H	A
Result	L	W	W	W	W	W	W	W	D	W	W	W	D	W	W	W	L	W	W	W	W	W	W	D	L	W	D	W	W	W	W	W	W	L
Position	14	6	3	3	3	3	3	1	2	2	2	2	2	2	2	2	2	2	2	2	2	2	1	1	2	1	2	1	1	1	1	1	1	1

Updated to match(es) played on 25 July 2020. Source: Liga Portugal
A = Away; H = Home; W = Win; D = Draw; L = Loss

==== Matches ====
10 August 2019 1	Gil Vicente	2–1	Porto	Barcelos
19:00 WEST	Lourency 60'; Kraev 77'		Telles 73' (pen.)	Stadium: Estádio Cidade de Barcelos; Attendance: 10,962; Referee: Nuno Almeida

17 August 2019 2	Porto	4–0	Vitória de Setúbal	Porto
21:30 WEST	Zé Luís 11', 20', 63'; Díaz 64'			Stadium: Estádio do Dragão; Attendance: 38,820; Referee: Manuel Mota

24 August 2019 3	Benfica	0–2	Porto	Lisbon
19:00 WEST			Zé Luís 22'; Marega 86'	Stadium: Estádio da Luz; Attendance: 62,735; Referee: Jorge Sousa

1 September 2019 4	Porto	3–0	Vitória de Guimarães	Porto
18:30 WEST	Marega 14', 90+3'; Marcano 88'			Stadium: Estádio do Dragão; Attendance: 47,711; Referee: Carlos Xistra

15 September 2019 5	Portimonense	2–3	Porto	Portimão
18:00 WEST	Dener 74'; Anzai 77'		Telles 25' (pen.); Zé Luís 45'; Marcano 90+8'	Stadium: Estádio Municipal de Portimão; Attendance: 5,499; Referee: Rui Costa

22 September 2019 6	Porto	2–0	Santa Clara	Porto
20:30 WEST	Zé Luís 15'; César 41' (o.g.)			Stadium: Estádio do Dragão; Attendance: 36,120; Referee: Luís Godinho

29 September 2019 7	Rio Ave	0–1	Porto	Vila do Conde
20:00 WEST			Marega 12'	Stadium: Estádio dos Arcos; Attendance: 4,411; Referee: Nuno Almeida

27 October 2019 8	Porto	3–0	Famalicão	Porto
17:30 WEST	Díaz 45'; Soares 72'; Silva 88'			Stadium: Estádio do Dragão; Attendance: 47,807; Referee: Fábio Veríssimo

30 October 2019 9	Marítimo	1–1	Porto	Funchal
18:45 WEST	Bambock 11'		Pepe 85'	Stadium: Estádio dos Barreiros; Attendance: 9,381; Referee: Jorge Sousa

3 November 2019 10	Porto	1–0	Desportivo das Aves	Porto
20:00 WEST	Marcano 13'			Stadium: Estádio do Dragão; Attendance: 29,205; Referee: Hélder Malheiro

10 November 2019 11	Boavista	0–1	Porto	Porto
21:00 WEST			Telles 9'	Stadium: Estádio do Bessa; Attendance: 16,514; Referee: Nuno Almeida

2 December 2019 12	Porto	2–0	Paços de Ferreira	Porto
20:45 WEST	Loum 18'; Zé Luís 76'			Stadium: Estádio do Dragão; Attendance: 26,215; Referee: Tiago Martins

8 December 2019 13	Belenenses	1–1	Porto	Oeiras
20:00 WEST	Santos 14'		Telles 32' (pen.)	Stadium: Estádio Nacional; Attendance: 5,153; Referee: João Pinheiro

16 December 2019 14	Porto	3–0	Tondela	Porto
20:15 WEST	Soares 10', 32'; Otávio 51'			Stadium: Estádio do Dragão; Attendance: 19,829; Referee: Manuel Oliveira

5 January 2020 15	Sporting CP	1–2	Porto	Lisbon
17:30 WEST	Acuña 44'		Marega 6'; Soares 73'	Stadium: Estádio José Alvalade; Attendance: 41,247; Referee: Jorge Sousa

10 January 2020 16	Moreirense	2–4	Porto	Moreira de Cónegos
21:15 WEST	Abreu 3'; Aurélio 44'		Soares 32'; Telles 39' (pen.); Díaz 72'; Corona 85'	Stadium: Parque de Jogos Comendador Joaquim de Almeida Freitas; Attendance: 3,525; Referee: Artur Soares Dias

17 January 2020 17	Porto	1–2	Braga	Porto
19:00 WEST	Soares 58'		Fransérgio 5'; Paulinho 75'	Stadium: Estádio do Dragão; Attendance: 35,611; Referee: Carlos Xistra

28 January 2020 18	Porto	2–1	Gil Vicente	Porto
20:15 WEST	Marcano 45+2'; Oliveira 57'		Lima 45'	Stadium: Estádio do Dragão; Attendance: 18,605; Referee: Rui Oliveira

1 February 2020 19	Vitória de Setúbal	0–4	Porto	Setúbal
18:00 WEST			Corona 39'; Telles 44'; Soares 48'; Díaz 90+1'	Stadium: Estádio do Bonfim; Attendance: 7,390; Referee: Manuel Mota

8 February 2020 20	Porto	3–2	Benfica	Porto
20:30 WEST	Oliveira 10'; Telles 38' (pen.); Dias 44' (o.g.)		Carlos Vinícius 18', 50'	Stadium: Estádio do Dragão; Attendance: 49,227; Referee: Artur Soares Dias

16 February 2020 21	Vitória de Guimarães	1–2	Porto	Guimarães
17:30 WEST	Bruno Duarte 49'		Douglas 10' (o.g.); Marega 60'	Stadium: Estádio D. Afonso Henriques; Attendance: 23,896; Referee: Luís Godinho

23 February 2020 22	Porto	1–0	Portimonense	Porto
20:30 WEST	Telles 87'			Stadium: Estádio do Dragão; Attendance: 40,129; Referee: Hugo Miguel

2 March 2020 23	Santa Clara	0–2	Porto	Ponta Delgada
19:30 WEST			Manafá 37'; Marcano 76'	Stadium: Estádio de São Miguel; Attendance: 6,271; Referee: Carlos Xistra

7 March 2020 24	Porto	1–1	Rio Ave	Porto
20:30 WEST	Mbemba 18'		Taremi 32'	Stadium: Estádio do Dragão; Attendance: 38,219; Referee: Artur Soares Dias

3 June 2020 25	Famalicão	2–1	Porto	Vila Nova de Famalicão
21:15 WEST	Martins 48'; Gonçalves 78'		Corona 74'	Stadium: Estádio Municipal 22 de Junho; Attendance: – Referee: Nuno Almeida

10 June 2020 26	Porto	1–0	Marítimo	Porto
21:30 WEST	Corona 6'			Stadium: Estádio do Dragão; Attendance: – Referee: Tiago Martins

16 June 2020 27	Desportivo das Aves	0–0	Porto	Vila das Aves
21:15 WEST				Stadium: Estádio do CD Aves; Attendance: – Referee: Carlos Xistra

23 June 2020 28	Porto	4–0	Boavista	Porto
21:15 WEST	Marega 53', 84'; Telles 60' (pen.); Oliveira 70' (pen.)			Stadium: Estádio do Dragão; Attendance: – Referee: Artur Soares Dias

29 June 2020 29	Paços de Ferreira	0–1	Porto	Paços de Ferreira
21:15 WEST			Mbemba 7'	Stadium: Estádio da Mata Real; Attendance: – Referee: Luís Godinho

5 July 2020 30	Porto	5–0	Belenenses	Porto
21:30 WEST	Soares 31'; Marega 59'; Telles 75' (pen.); Vieira 82'; Díaz 90+2'			Stadium: Estádio do Dragão; Attendance: – Referee: Rui Oliveira

9 July 2020 31	Tondela	1–3	Porto	Tondela
19:15 WEST	Ronan 77' (pen.)		Pereira 47'; Marega 64'; Vieira 90+5' (pen.)	Stadium: Estádio João Cardoso; Attendance: – Referee: Fábio Veríssimo

15 July 2020 32	Porto	2–0	Sporting CP	Porto
21:30 WEST	Pereira 64'; Marega 90+3'			Stadium: Estádio do Dragão; Attendance: – Referee: João Pinheiro

20 July 2020 33	Porto	6–1	Moreirense	Porto
21:15 WEST	Díaz 4'; Otávio 51'; Telles 56' (pen.); Marega 60'; Soares 78', 87'		Abreu 20'	Stadium: Estádio do Dragão; Attendance: – Referee: Carlos Xistra

25 July 2020 34	Braga	2–1	Porto	Braga
21:15 WEST	R. Horta 54'; Fransérgio 66'		Uribe 6'	Stadium: Estádio Municipal de Braga; Attendance: – Referee: Jorge Sousa

=== Taça de Portugal ===
==== Third round ====
19 October 2019	SC Coimbrões (CP)	0–5	(I) Porto	Pedroso
18:45 WEST			Díaz 6', 68'; Soares 8'; Mbemba 12'; Silva 81'	Stadium: Estádio Municipal Jorge Sampaio; Referee: Rui Oliveira

==== Fourth round ====
24 November 2019	Porto (I)	4–0	(I) Vitória de Setúbal	Porto
17:30 WEST	Mbemba 35'; Silva 42'; Jubal 56' (o.g.); Marega 59'			Stadium: Estádio do Dragão; Attendance: 22,148; Referee: Carlos Xistra

==== Fifth round ====
19 December 2019	Porto (I)	1–0	(I) Santa Clara	Porto
19:15 WEST	Nakajima 29'			Stadium: Estádio do Dragão; Attendance: 10,661; Referee: Fábio Veríssimo

==== Quarter-finals ====
14 January 2020	Porto (I)	2–1	(II) Varzim	Porto
18:00 WEST	Soares 28'; Marcano 41'		Hugo 36'	Stadium: Estádio do Dragão; Attendance: 13,179; Referee: Rui Costa

==== Semi-finals ====
4 February 2020 First leg	Académico de Viseu (II)	1–1	(I) Porto	Viseu
20:45 WEST	João Mário 71'		Zé Luís 59'	Stadium: Estádio do Fontelo; Attendance: 6,043; Referee: João Pinheiro

12 February 2020 Second leg	Porto (I)	3–0 (4–1 agg.)	(II) Académico de Viseu	Porto
20:45 WEST	Telles 19' (pen.); Zé Luís 64'; Oliveira 72'			Stadium: Estádio do Dragão; Attendance: 19,929; Referee: Manuel Oliveira

==== Final ====
1 August 2020	Benfica (I)	1–2	(I) Porto	Coimbra
20:45 WEST	Vinícius 84' (pen.)		Mbemba 47', 57'	Stadium: Estádio Cidade de Coimbra; Attendance: – Referee: Artur Soares Dias

=== Taça da Liga ===
==== Third round ====
Pos	Team	Pld	W	D	L	GF	GA	GD	Pts	Qualification
1	Porto	3	3	0	0	8	2	+6	9	Advanced to knockout phase
2	Chaves	3	2	0	1	4	4	0	6	
3	Casa Pia	3	1	0	2	2	5	−3	3	
4	Santa Clara	3	0	0	3	1	4	−3	0	

Source: Liga Portugal
Rules for classification: Tiebreakers

25 September 2019 1	Porto	1–0	Santa Clara	Porto
21:00 WEST	Leite 45+2'			Stadium: Estádio do Dragão; Attendance: 25,004; Referee: António Nobre

5 December 2019 2	Casa Pia	0–3	Porto	Lisbon
20:15 WET			Saravia 50'; Díaz 68'; Soares 72'	Stadium: Estádio Pina Manique; Attendance: 1,254; Referee: Vítor Ferreira

22 December 2019 3	Chaves	2–4	Porto	Chaves
19:15 WET	Platiny 78'; André Luís 84'		Soares 8', 16'; Marega 26'; Díaz 80'	Stadium: Estádio Municipal de Chaves; Attendance: 5,276; Referee: Carlos Xistra

==== Semi-finals ====
22 January 2020	Vitória de Guimarães	1–2	Porto	Braga
19:45 WET	Tapsoba 65' (pen.)		Telles 66'; Soares 75'	Stadium: Estádio Municipal de Braga; Attendance: 13,107; Referee: Jorge Sousa

==== Final ====
25 January 2020	Braga	1–0	Porto	Braga
19:45 WET	R. Horta 90+5'			Stadium: Estádio Municipal de Braga; Attendance: 23,794; Referee: Luís Godinho

=== UEFA Champions League ===
==== Third qualifying round ====
7 August 2019 First leg	Krasnodar (Russia)	0–1	(Portugal) Porto	Krasnodar, Russia
18:00 WEST			Oliveira 89'	Stadium: Krasnodar Stadium; Attendance: 34,874; Referee: Tobias Stieler (Germany)

13 August 2019 Second leg	Porto (Portugal)	2–3	(Russia) Krasnodar	Porto, Portugal
20:00 WEST	Zé Luís 57'; Díaz 76'		Vilhena 3'; Suleymanov 12', 34'	Stadium: Estádio do Dragão; Attendance: 48,520; Referee: Marco Guida (Italy)

3–3 on aggregate. Krasnodar won on away goals.

=== UEFA Europa League ===
==== Group stage ====
Pos	Team	Pld	W	D	L	GF	GA	GD	Pts	Qualification
1	(Portugal) Porto	6	3	1	2	8	9	−1	10	Advance to knockout phase
2	(Scotland) Rangers	6	2	3	1	8	6	+2	9	Advance to knockout phase
3	(Switzerland) Young Boys	6	2	2	2	8	7	+1	8	
4	(Netherlands) Feyenoord	6	1	2	3	7	9	−2	5	

Source: UEFA
Rules for classification: Group stage tiebreakers

19 September 2019 1	Porto (Portugal)	2–1	(Switzerland) Young Boys	Porto, Portugal
20:00 WEST	Soares 8', 29'		Nsame 15' (pen.)	Stadium: Estádio do Dragão; Attendance: 32,929; Referee: Andris Treimanis (Latvia)

3 October 2019 2	Feyenoord (Netherlands)	2–0	(Portugal) Porto	Rotterdam, Netherlands
17:55 WEST	Toornstra 49'; Karsdorp 80'			Stadium: De Kuip; Referee: Sergei Karasev (Russia)

24 October 2019 3	Porto (Portugal)	1–1	(Scotland) Rangers	Porto, Portugal
17:55 WEST	Díaz 36'		Morelos 44'	Stadium: Estádio do Dragão; Attendance: 31,307; Referee: Nikola Dabanović (Montenegro)

7 November 2019 4	Rangers (Scotland)	2–0	(Portugal) Porto	Glasgow, Scotland
20:00 WEST	Morelos 69'; Davis 73'			Stadium: Ibrox Stadium; Attendance: 49,645; Referee: Davide Massa (Italy)

28 November 2019 5	Young Boys (Switzerland)	1–2	(Portugal) Porto	Bern, Switzerland
17:55 WEST	Fassnacht 6'		Aboubakar 75', 79'	Stadium: Stade de Suisse; Referee: Tamás Bognár (Hungary)

12 December 2019 6	Porto (Portugal)	3–2	(Netherlands) Feyenoord	Porto, Portugal
20:00 WET	Díaz 14'; Malacia 15' (o.g.); Soares 33'		Botteghin 19'; Larsson 22'	Stadium: Estádio do Dragão; Attendance: 28,507; Referee: Deniz Aytekin (Germany)

==== Knockout phase ====
===== Round of 32 =====
20 February 2020 First leg	Bayer Leverkusen (Germany)	2–1	(Portugal) Porto	Leverkusen, Germany
20:00 WEST	Alario 29'; Havertz 57' (pen.)		Díaz 73'	Stadium: BayArena; Attendance: 26,839; Referee: Slavko Vinčić (Slovenia)

27 February 2020 Second leg	Porto (Portugal)	1–3 (2–5 agg.)	(Germany) Bayer Leverkusen	Porto, Portugal
20:00 WEST	Marega 65'		Alario 10'; Demirbay 50'; Havertz 57'	Stadium: Estádio do Dragão; Attendance: 30,292; Referee: István Kovács (Romania)

== Statistics ==
As of 1 August 2020

=== Appearances and discipline ===
Numbers in parentheses denote appearances as substitute.

No.	Pos.	Player	Primeira Liga				Taça de Portugal				Taça da Liga				Champions League				Europa League				Total			
No.	Pos.	Player	Apps	Yellow card	Second yellow card	Red card	Apps	Yellow card	Second yellow card	Red card	Apps	Yellow card	Second yellow card	Red card	Apps	Yellow card	Second yellow card	Red card	Apps	Yellow card	Second yellow card	Red card	Apps	Yellow card	Second yellow card	Red card
2	DF	(Portugal) Tomás Esteves	2 (0)	0	0	0	0 (0)	0	0	0	0 (1)	0	0	0	0 (0)	0	0	0	0 (0)	0	0	0	2 (1)	0	0	0
3	DF	(Portugal) Pepe	24 (1)	5	0	0	2 (0)	0	0	0	1 (0)	0	0	0	2 (0)	0	0	0	6 (1)	2	0	0	35 (2)	7	0	0
4	DF	(Portugal) Diogo Leite	4 (5)	1	0	0	5 (1)	2	0	0	2 (0)	0	0	0	0 (0)	0	0	0	0 (1)	0	0	0	11 (7)	3	0	0
5	DF	(Spain) Iván Marcano	23 (0)	6	0	0	1 (0)	0	0	0	3 (0)	1	0	0	2 (0)	0	0	0	8 (0)	3	0	0	37 (0)	10	0	0
7	FW	(Colombia) Luis Díaz	20 (9)	2	0	0	6 (0)	0	1	0	3 (2)	1	0	0	1 (1)	0	0	0	5 (3)	1	0	0	35 (15)	4	1	0
8	MF	(Portugal) Romário Baró	4 (5)	0	0	0	1 (3)	1	0	0	1 (2)	2	0	0	1 (0)	1	0	0	0 (1)	0	0	0	7 (11)	4	0	0
9	FW	(Cameroon) Vincent Aboubakar	1 (4)	0	0	0	0 (2)	0	0	0	0 (0)	0	0	0	0 (1)	0	0	0	1 (0)	1	0	0	2 (7)	1	0	0
10	FW	(Japan) Shoya Nakajima	5 (11)	1	0	0	2 (2)	0	0	0	3 (0)	0	0	0	1 (0)	0	0	0	1 (3)	1	0	0	12 (16)	2	0	0
11	FW	(Mali) Moussa Marega	27 (2)	5	0	0	3 (1)	0	0	0	3 (0)	0	0	0	2 (0)	1	0	0	7 (0)	0	0	0	42 (3)	6	0	0
13	DF	(Brazil) Alex Telles	28 (3)	7	1	1	4 (1)	1	0	0	3 (0)	0	0	0	2 (0)	0	0	0	8 (0)	2	0	0	45 (4)	10	1	1
15	MF	(Senegal) Mamadou Loum	4 (2)	0	0	0	3 (1)	1	0	0	0 (0)	0	0	0	0 (0)	0	0	0	1 (0)	0	0	0	8 (3)	1	0	0
16	MF	(Colombia) Mateus Uribe	22 (4)	5	0	0	4 (0)	0	0	0	2 (1)	1	0	0	0 (1)	1	0	0	7 (0)	2	0	0	35 (6)	9	0	0
17	FW	(Mexico) Jesús Corona	33 (0)	5	1	0	4 (1)	0	0	0	3 (1)	2	0	0	2 (0)	1	0	0	7 (0)	2	0	0	49 (2)	10	1	0
18	DF	(Portugal) Wilson Manafá	20 (7)	6	0	0	7 (0)	0	0	0	3 (2)	0	0	0	1 (0)	0	0	0	3 (2)	2	0	0	34 (11)	8	0	0
19	DF	(Democratic Republic of the Congo) Chancel Mbemba	21 (5)	3	0	0	6 (0)	0	0	0	5 (0)	1	0	0	0 (0)	0	0	0	4 (1)	1	0	0	36 (6)	5	0	0
20	FW	(Cape Verde) Zé Luís	11 (8)	4	0	0	3 (0)	1	0	0	0 (1)	0	0	0	0 (2)	1	0	0	3 (3)	1	0	0	17 (14)	7	0	0
22	MF	(Portugal) Danilo Pereira	23 (3)	2	0	0	2 (1)	0	0	0	2 (0)	1	0	0	2 (0)	1	0	0	6 (1)	1	0	0	35 (5)	5	0	0
25	MF	(Brazil) Otávio	29 (2)	11	0	0	5 (0)	1	0	0	2 (2)	1	0	0	0 (1)	0	0	0	7 (0)	3	0	0	43 (5)	16	0	0
27	MF	(Portugal) Sérgio Oliveira	14 (6)	7	0	0	1 (4)	0	0	0	4 (0)	1	0	0	2 (0)	0	0	0	2 (1)	1	0	0	23 (11)	9	0	0
29	FW	(Brazil) Soares	20 (10)	7	0	0	2 (3)	0	0	0	5 (0)	0	0	0	1 (0)	0	0	0	4 (3)	0	0	1	32 (16)	7	0	1
31	GK	(Portugal) Diogo Costa	3 (0)	0	0	0	7 (0)	0	0	0	5 (0)	0	0	0	0 (0)	0	0	0	0 (0)	0	0	0	15 (0)	0	0	0
32	GK	(Argentina) Agustín Marchesín	31 (0)	4	0	0	0 (0)	0	0	0	0 (0)	0	0	0	2 (0)	0	0	0	8 (0)	1	0	0	41 (0)	5	0	0
49	FW	(Portugal) Fábio Silva	1 (11)	0	0	0	3 (0)	0	0	0	1 (2)	0	0	0	0 (0)	0	0	0	0 (3)	0	0	0	5 (16)	0	0	0
50	MF	(Portugal) Fábio Vieira	2 (6)	0	0	0	0 (0)	0	0	0	0 (0)	0	0	0	0 (0)	0	0	0	0 (0)	0	0	0	2 (6)	0	0	0
51	GK	(Senegal) Mouhamed Mbaye	0 (1)	0	0	0	0 (0)	0	0	0	0 (0)	0	0	0	0 (0)	0	0	0	0 (0)	0	0	0	0 (1)	0	0	0
57	MF	(Portugal) João Mário	0 (2)	1	0	0	0 (0)	0	0	0	0 (0)	0	0	0	0 (0)	0	0	0	0 (0)	0	0	0	0 (2)	1	0	0
71	GK	(Portugal) Francisco Meixedo	0 (0)	0	0	0	0 (0)	0	0	0	0 (0)	0	0	0	0 (0)	0	0	0	0 (0)	0	0	0	0 (0)	0	0	0
77	MF	(Portugal) Vítor Ferreira	0 (8)	0	0	0	2 (1)	0	0	0	0 (1)	0	0	0	0 (0)	0	0	0	0 (0)	0	0	0	2 (10)	0	0	0
Totals				82	2	1		7	1	0		11	0	0		6	0	0		24	0	1		130	3	2

=== Goalscorers ===
Rank	No.	Pos.	Player	Primeira Liga	Taça de Portugal	Taça da Liga	Champions League	Europa League	Total
1	29	FW	(Brazil) Francisco Soares	10	2	4	0	3	19
2	11	FW	(Mali) Moussa Marega	12	1	1	0	1	15
3	7	FW	(Colombia) Luis Díaz	6	2	2	1	3	14
4	13	DF	(Brazil) Alex Telles	11	1	1	0	0	13
5	20	FW	(Cape Verde) Zé Luís	7	2	0	1	0	10
6	19	DF	(Democratic Republic of the Congo) Chancel Mbemba	2	4	0	0	0	6
6	5	DF	(Spain) Iván Marcano	5	1	0	0	0	6
7	27	MF	(Portugal) Sérgio Oliveira	3	1	0	1	0	5
9	17	FW	(Mexico) Jesús Corona	4	0	0	0	0	4
10	49	FW	(Portugal) Fábio Silva	1	2	0	0	0	3
11	22	MF	(Portugal) Danilo Pereira	2	0	0	0	0	2
11	50	MF	(Portugal) Fábio Vieira	2	0	0	0	0	2
11	25	MF	(Brazil) Otávio	2	0	0	0	0	2
11	9	FW	(Cameroon) Vincent Aboubakar	0	0	0	0	2	2
15	4	DF	(Portugal) Diogo Leite	0	0	1	0	0	1
15	3	DF	(Portugal) Pepe	1	0	0	0	0	1
15	18	DF	(Portugal) Wilson Manafá	1	0	0	0	0	1
15	15	MF	(Senegal) Mamadou Loum	1	0	0	0	0	1
15	16	MF	(Colombia) Mateus Uribe	1	0	0	0	0	1
15	10	MF	(Japan) Shoya Nakajima	0	1	0	0	0	1
Totals				71	17	9	3	9	109

=== Clean sheets ===
No.	Player	Primeira Liga	Taça de Portugal	Taça da Liga	Champions League	Europa League	Total
32	(Argentina) Agustín Marchesín	18	0	0	1	0	19
31	(Portugal) Diogo Costa	1	4	2	0	0	7
Totals		19	4	2	1	0	26
