= Zezinho =

Zezinho may refer to:

- Zezinho (footballer, born June 1930) (1930–1980), full name Moyses Ferreira Alves, Brazilian football midfielder
- Zézinho (footballer, born March 1930) (1930–2015), full name José Gouveia Martins, Portuguese football half-back
- Zezinho (footballer, born March 1992), full name José Luís dos Santos Pinto, Brazilian football winger
- Zezinho (Bissau-Guinean footballer) (born 1992), full name José Luís Mendes Lopes, Bissau-Guinean football midfielder
- Zezinho (footballer, born 1995), full name Inácio José Trocado Marques, Portuguese left-back
