= 2020 Taça de Portugal final =

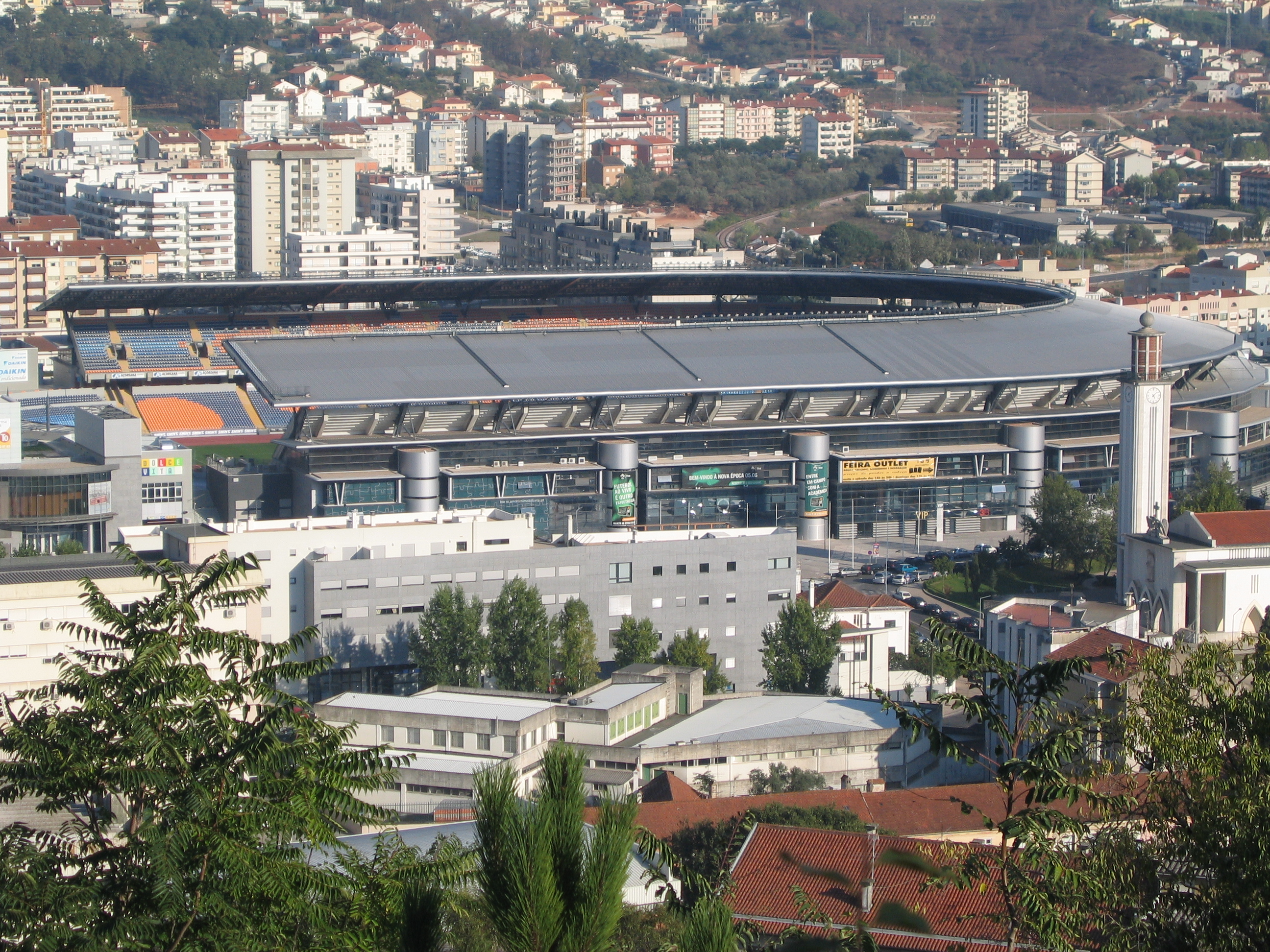
- Estádio Cidade de Coimbra
- Event: 2019–20 Taça de Portugal
Benfica	Porto
1	2
- Date: 1 August 2020
- Venue: Estádio Cidade de Coimbra, Coimbra
- Man of the Match: Chancel Mbemba (Porto)
- Fair Player of the Match: Danilo Pereira (Porto)
- Referee: Artur Soares Dias
- Attendance: 0 (Note: The final was played behind closed doors due to the COVID-19 pandemic in Portugal.)

The 2020 Taça de Portugal final was the final match of the 2019–20 Taça de Portugal, which decided the winner of the 80th season of the Taça de Portugal. It was played at the Estádio Cidade de Coimbra in Coimbra, between Benfica and Porto.

It was the 37th final for Benfica in the competition's history after they won the 2017 final, while Porto returned a year later to dispute its 31st final of the Portuguese Cup, after they lost the 2019 final to Sporting CP.

The defending champions were Sporting CP, however, they were knocked out in the third round by third-tier side Alverca.

The final was originally scheduled to take place on 24 May 2020 at the Estádio Nacional venue in Oeiras. However, on 12 March, the Portuguese Football Federation (FPF) announced that it would be postponed due to the COVID-19 pandemic in Portugal, following the recommendations of the government. On 28 April, the Portuguese Prime Minister António Costa reunited with the presidents of the "Big Three" clubs in Portugal (Benfica, Sporting CP, and Porto), the president of the Portuguese Football Federation, and the president of the Liga Portuguesa de Futebol Profissional, to discuss the conditions of the return of football competitions in Portugal. Two days later, with the consent of the Ministry of Health, Costa approved the return of the final, with the match being played behind closed doors.

On 2 July, it was announced that the final would be played on 1 August at the Estádio Cidade de Coimbra in Coimbra, behind closed doors. The match marked the fifth time the final was played outside of the Estadio Nacional which traditionally held the occasion every year since the 1983 final was played at Porto's former ground, the Estádio das Antas. The match also became the fourth final played at Coimbra after the city had hosted it last time 83 years ago at the Campo do Arnado.

== Route to the final ==
Benfica		Round	Porto
Opponent	Result	2019–20 Taça de Portugal	Opponent	Result
Cova da Piedade	4–0 (A)	Third round	SC Coimbrões	5–0 (A)
Vizela	2–1 (A)	Fourth round	Vitória de Setúbal	4–0 (H)
Braga	2–1 (H)	Fifth round	Santa Clara	1–0 (H)
Rio Ave	3–2 (H)	Quarter-finals	Varzim	2–1 (H)
Famalicão	3–2 (H)	Semi-finals	Académico de Viseu	1–1 (A)
Famalicão	1–1 (A)	Semi-finals	Académico de Viseu	3–0 (H)

Note: H = home fixture, A = away fixture

== Match ==
=== Details ===
1 August 2020
20:45 WEST

Benfica	1–2	Porto
Vinícius 84' (pen.)		Mbemba 47', 58'

Estádio Cidade de Coimbra, Coimbra
Attendance: 0
Referee: Artur Soares Dias

Benfica	Porto

GK	99	(Greece) Odysseas Vlachodimos
RB	34	(Portugal) André Almeida
CB	6	(Portugal) Rúben Dias	(yellow card) 12'
CB	33	(Brazil) Jardel (c)	(yellow card) 44'
LB	71	(Portugal) Nuno Tavares
RW	21	(Portugal) Pizzi		(substituted off) 76'
CM	28	(Germany) Julian Weigl	(yellow card) 46'	(substituted off) 60'
CM	8	(Brazil) Gabriel
LW	11	(Argentina) Franco Cervi		(substituted off) 46'
CF	19	(Portugal) Chiquinho		(substituted off) 60'
CF	14	(Switzerland) Haris Seferovic		(substituted off) 76'
Substitutes:
GK	1	(Belgium) Mile Svilar
DF	84	(Portugal) Tomás Tavares
DF	97	(Portugal) Ferro
MF	27	(Portugal) Rafa Silva		(substituted on) 46'
MF	49	(Morocco) Adel Taarabt		(substituted on) 60'
MF	61	(Portugal) Florentino Luís
FW	20	(Portugal) Dyego Sousa		(substituted on) 76'
FW	73	(Portugal) Jota		(substituted on) 76'
FW	95	(Brazil) Carlos Vinícius	(yellow card) 75'	(substituted on) 60'
Manager:
(Portugal) Nélson Veríssimo

GK	31	(Portugal) Diogo Costa
RB	18	(Portugal) Wilson Manafá
CB	19	(Democratic Republic of the Congo) Chancel Mbemba
CB	3	(Portugal) Pepe
LB	13	(Brazil) Alex Telles	(yellow card) 90'
CM	25	(Portugal) Otávio		(substituted off) 73'
CM	22	(Portugal) Danilo Pereira (c)
CM	16	(Colombia) Mateus Uribe		(substituted off) 88'
RW	17	(Mexico) Jesús Corona		(substituted off) 80'
CF	11	(Mali) Moussa Marega
LW	7	(Colombia) Luis Díaz	(yellow card) 9' (yellow-red card) 38'
Substitutes:
GK	32	(Argentina) Agustín Marchesín
DF	4	(Portugal) Diogo Leite		(substituted on) 73'
MF	8	(Portugal) Romário Baró
MF	15	(Senegal) Mamadou Loum		(substituted on) 88'
MF	27	(Portugal) Sérgio Oliveira		(substituted on) 80'
MF	57	(Portugal) João Mário
MF	77	(Portugal) Vítor Ferreira
FW	9	(Cameroon) Vincent Aboubakar
FW	29	(Brazil) Francisco Soares
Manager:
(Portugal) Sérgio Conceição

Man of the Match:
Chancel Mbemba (Porto)
Fair Player of the Match:
Danilo Pereira (Porto)

Assistant referees:
Rui Tavares
Paulo Soares
Fourth official:
Manuel Mota
Video assistant referee:
Hugo Miguel
Assistant video assistant referees:
António Godinho
Nuno Almeida

Match rules

- 90 minutes
- 30 minutes of extra time if necessary
- Penalty shoot-out if scores still level
- Nine named substitutes
- Maximum of five substitutions, with a sixth allowed in extra time (Note: Each team was given only three opportunities to make substitutions, with a fourth opportunity in extra time, excluding substitutions made at half-time, before the start of extra time and at half-time in extra time.)

== See also ==
- O Clássico
- 2019–20 S.L. Benfica season
- 2019–20 FC Porto season
- 2020 Taça da Liga final
