= Chancel Mbemba =

Congolese footballer (born 1994)

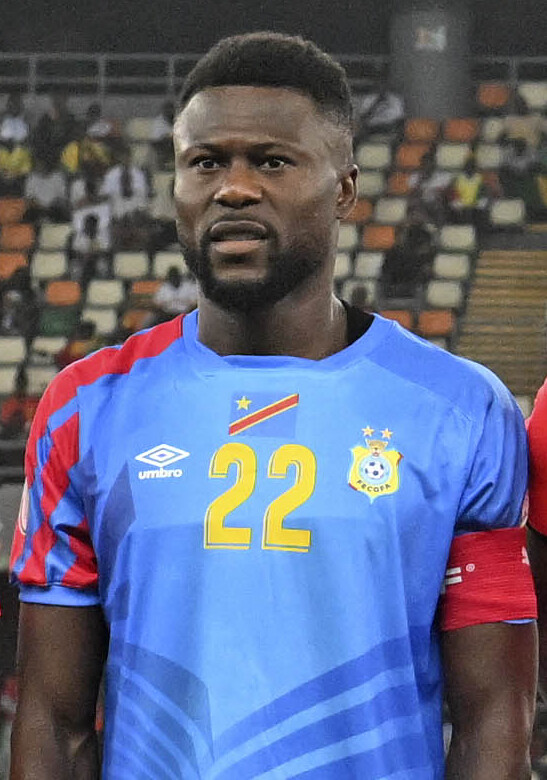
- Mbemba in 2024

Personal information
- Full name: Chancel Mangulu Mbemba
- Date of birth: 8 August 1994 (age 32)
- Place of birth: Kinshasa, Zaire (now DR Congo)
- Height: 1.82 m (6 ft 0 in)
- Position: Centre-back

Team information
- Current team: Al-Diriyah
- Number: 99

Youth career
- 2006–2007: E.S. La Grace
- 2007–2008: Mputu
- 2008–2012: MK Etanchéité
- 2012–2013: Anderlecht

Senior career*
Years	Team	Apps	(Gls)
2013–2015	Anderlecht	63	(6)
2015–2018	Newcastle United	54	(1)
2018–2022	Porto	87	(5)
2022–2025	Marseille	61	(7)
2025–2026	Lille	13	(0)
2026–	Al-Diriyah	12	(0)

International career^{‡}
2012–	DR Congo	119	(8)
Medal record
Men's Football
Representing DR Congo
Africa Cup of Nations
Bronze medal – third place	2015
- * Club domestic league appearances and goals as of 17:00, 30 October 2026 (UTC) ‡ National team caps and goals as of 17:54, 17 November 2026 (UTC)

Chancel Mangulu Mbemba (born 8 August 1994) is a Congolese professional footballer who plays as a centre-back for Saudi Pro League club Al-Diriyah and captains the DR Congo national team.

Mbemba began his professional career at Anderlecht, where he won the Belgian Pro League in his debut season of 2013–14. A year later, he moved to Newcastle United, where he played in the Premier League and won the Championship in 2017. In four years at Porto, he won the Primeira Liga and Taça de Portugal double in 2020 and 2022.

A full international for DR Congo since 2012, Mbemba is the national team's most capped player. He represented the country at six Africa Cup of Nations tournaments, finishing third in 2015, and the 2026 FIFA World Cup.

== Early life ==
Mbemba was born and raised in Kinshasa. He is one of nine children. His mother, Antoinette, is a former basketball player who represented the DR Congo women's national basketball team.

A 2013 report by CNN found conflicting documents that support four different dates of birth for Mbemba ranging from 1988 to 1994, with the player saying himself that he was born in 1990; an anonymous member of the Congolese Association Football Federation said that his date of birth was changed to 1991 so that he could be eligible for the 2012 Olympics where players must be under 23. Upon signing for Newcastle, he said that he was born in 1994 and that there was forensic proof.

== Club career ==
=== Anderlecht ===
After playing youth football for several clubs including E.S. La Grace and FC MK Etanchéité in Kinshasa, Mbemba joined Belgian club Anderlecht in 2012. Upon moving, he mainly played with Anderlecht reserve and youth teams, and requested to have a bone scan to dispel rumours that he was older than he actually was.

On 21 July 2013, Mbemba was an unused substitute as Anderlecht won the Belgian Super Cup 1–0 against Genk. He made his debut a week later in their opening match of the Belgian Pro League season, a 3–2 home defeat to Lokeren. He scored five goals in 35 games of a league-winning campaign, starting by concluding a 2–0 win at Mons on 18 October, a contribution to becoming the league's Player of the Month.

Mbemba played in the 2014 Belgian Super Cup, a 2–1 win over Lokeren. he made 28 appearances during the 2014–15 season as they finished in third spot in the league, and runners-up in the 2014–15 Belgian Cup, losing 1–2 to Club Brugge in the final.

=== Newcastle United ===
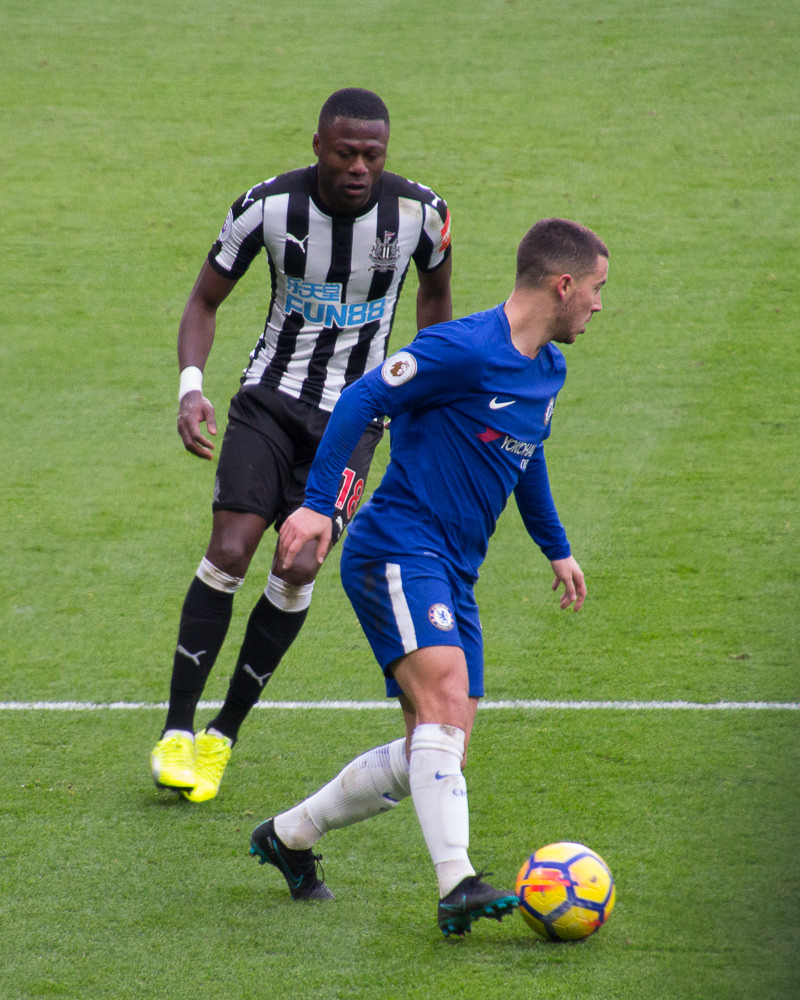
Mbemba (left) and Chelsea's Eden Hazard in 2017

On 26 July 2015, Premier League side Newcastle United announced the signing of Mbemba. Four days later, he signed a five-year contract with the club. He made his debut on 9 August on the first day of the Premier League season, starting in a 2–2 home draw with Southampton.

He scored his only goal for the club on 7 May 2017 against Barnsley in a 3–0 home win, on the same day that Newcastle clinched the EFL Championship title a year after relegation.

=== Porto ===
On 23 July 2018, Primeira Liga side Porto signed Mbemba for a reported £7.14 million fee. He made his debut on 31 October in a 4–2 home win over Varzim in the group stage of the Taça da Liga, with manager Sérgio Conceição sending out a completely different team to the previous league game. Four days later he made his Primeira Liga bow as an 80th-minute substitute for striker Yacine Brahimi in a 2–0 victory at Marítimo; he played only two more league games that season, one of which was a start in a 3–1 win over Nacional at the Estádio do Dragão on 7 January 2019. He also played two matches for the reserve team in LigaPro.

Mbemba scored his first goal for the Dragons on 24 November 2019, opening a 4–0 home win over Vitória de Setúbal that qualified his team to the last 16 of the Taça de Portugal. The following 7 March, he was on the scoreboard for the first time in the league, in a 1–1 draw with Rio Ave at the same venue; his team ended the season as champions. On 1 August 2020, Mbemba scored both goals of a 2–1 win over Benfica in the Taça de Portugal Final.

=== Marseille ===
On 15 July 2022, Mbemba signed a three-year contract with Marseille on a free transfer. He made his debut on 7 August as the Ligue 1 season began with a 4–1 home win over Reims, and scored his first goal in his third game on 20 August to open a 2–1 win over Nantes also at the Stade Vélodrome. On 7 September, he was sent off in a 2–0 Champions League loss at Tottenham Hotspur for a professional foul on Son Heung-min.

In August 2024, Mbemba was left out of the Marseille's squad by newly appointed head coach Roberto De Zerbi. He didn't play a single match during the 2024–25 season. His contract with Marseille expired on 30 June 2025.

=== Lille ===
On 1 September 2025, Mbemba signed a one-year contract with Lille OSC.

=== Al-Diriyah ===
On 5 August 2026, Mbemba joined newly promoted Saudi Pro League club Al-Diriyah.

== International career ==
Mbemba made his debut for the DR Congo on 17 June 2012, in a 3–0 home win over the Seychelles at the Stade des Martyrs in Kinshasa, in 2013 Africa Cup of Nations qualification. He was an unused member of Claude Le Roy's squad for the finals. He was part of the squad that came third at the 2015 Africa Cup of Nations in Equatorial Guinea, and scored a penalty in the shootout win over the hosts for the bronze medal.

On 13 October 2015, Mbemba scored his first international goal, a late long-distance winner in a 2–1 friendly against Gabon in Visé, Belgium. He also went to the Africa Cup of Nations in 2017 and 2019; in the latter in Egypt he scored a late header in a 2–2 draw with Madagascar in the last 16, though his team lost in a shootout.

On 13 November 2025, Mbemba earned his 100th international cap, becoming the first Congolese player to reach the milestone, and marked the occasion by scoring a stoppage-time winner in a 1–0 victory over Cameroon during the 2026 World Cup qualification second round. Three days later, he scored the decisive penalty in a 4–3 shootout victory over Nigeria after a 1–1 draw, sending his nation to the inter-confederation play-offs.

On May 19, 2026, he was included in the 26-man squad selected by head coach Sébastien Desabre to represent the DR Congo at the 2026 FIFA World Cup.

== Career statistics ==
=== Club ===
As of match played 30 October 2026

Appearances and goals by club, season and competition
Club	Season	League			National cup (Note: Includes Belgian Cup, FA Cup, Taça de Portugal, Coupe de France, King's Cup)		League cup (Note: Includes EFL Cup, Taça da Liga)		Continental		Other		Total	
Club	Season	Division	Apps	Goals	Apps	Goals	Apps	Goals	Apps	Goals	Apps	Goals	Apps	Goals
Anderlecht	2013–14	Belgian Pro League	35	5	0	0	—		5 (Note: Appearances in UEFA Champions League)	1	0	0	40	6
Anderlecht	2014–15	Belgian Pro League	28	1	2	0	—		6	2	1 (Note: Appearance in Belgian Super Cup)	0	37	3
Anderlecht	Total		63	6	2	0	—		11	3	1	0	77	9
Newcastle United	2015–16	Premier League	33	0	1	0	1	0	—		—		35	0
Newcastle United	2016–17	Championship	12	1	0	0	1	0	—		—		13	1
Newcastle United	2017–18	Premier League	9	0	1	0	1	0	—		—		11	0
Newcastle United	Total		54	1	2	0	3	0	—		—		59	1
Porto B	2018–19	Liga Portugal 2	2	0	—		—		—		—		2	0
Porto	2018–19	Primeira Liga	3	0	2	0	1	0	0	0	0	0	6	0
Porto	2019–20	Primeira Liga	26	2	6	4	5	0	5 (Note: Appearances in UEFA Europa League)	0	—		42	6
Porto	2020–21	Primeira Liga	27	1	4	0	1	0	10	0	1 (Note: Appearance in Supertaça Cândido de Oliveira)	0	43	1
Porto	2021–22	Primeira Liga	31	2	6	0	1	0	9 (Note: Five appearances in UEFA Champions League, four appearances in UEFA Europa League)	0	—		47	2
Porto	Total		87	5	18	4	8	0	24	0	1	0	138	9
Marseille	2022–23	Ligue 1	36	5	4	0	—		5	2	—		45	7
Marseille	2023–24	Ligue 1	25	2	0	0	—		15 (Note: Two appearances in UEFA Champions League, thirteen appearances and four goals in UEFA Europa League)	4	—		40	6
Marseille	2024–25	Ligue 1	0	0	0	0	—		0	0	—		0	0
Marseille	Total		61	7	4	0	—		20	6	—		85	13
Lille	2025–26	Ligue 1	13	0	0	0	—		8	0	—		21	0
Al-Diriyah	2026–27	Saudi Pro League	12	0	1	0	—		—		—		13	0
Career total			292	19	27	4	11	0	63	9	2	0	395	31

=== International ===
As of match played 17 November 2026

Appearances and goals by national team and year
National team	Year	Apps	Goals
DR Congo	2012	2	0
DR Congo	2013	2	0
DR Congo	2014	4	0
DR Congo	2015	14	1
DR Congo	2016	7	0
DR Congo	2017	12	2
DR Congo	2018	4	0
DR Congo	2019	10	1
DR Congo	2020	2	0
DR Congo	2021	8	0
DR Congo	2022	2	0
DR Congo	2023	8	0
DR Congo	2024	16	2
DR Congo	2025	14	1
DR Congo	2026	14	1
Total		119	8

Scores and results list DR Congo's goal tally first, score column indicates score after each Mbemba goal.

List of international goals scored by Chancel Mbemba
No.	Date	Venue	Opponent	Score	Result	Competition
1	12 October 2015	Stade de la Cité de l'Oie, Visé, Belgium	Gabon	2–1	2–1	Friendly
2	10 June 2017	Stade des Martyrs, Kinshasa, DR Congo	Congo	3–1	1–1	2019 Africa Cup of Nations qualification
3	5 September 2017	Stade des Martyrs, Kinshasa, DR Congo	Tunisia	1–0	2–2	2018 FIFA World Cup qualification
4	7 July 2019	Alexandria Stadium, Alexandria, Egypt	Madagascar	2–2	2–2 (a.e.t.) (2–4 p)	2019 Africa Cup of Nations
5	10 January 2024	Baniyas Stadium, Abu Dhabi, United Arab Emirates	Burkina Faso	1–2	1–2	Friendly
6	2 February 2024	Alassane Ouattara Stadium, Abidjan, Ivory Coast	Guinea	1–1	3–1	2023 Africa Cup of Nations
7	13 November 2025	Al Barid Stadium, Rabat, Morocco	Cameroon	1–0	1–0	2026 FIFA World Cup qualification
8	24 September 2026	Stade des Martyrs, Kinshasa, DR Congo	Equatorial Guinea	1–0	2–0	2027 Africa Cup of Nations qualification

== Honours ==
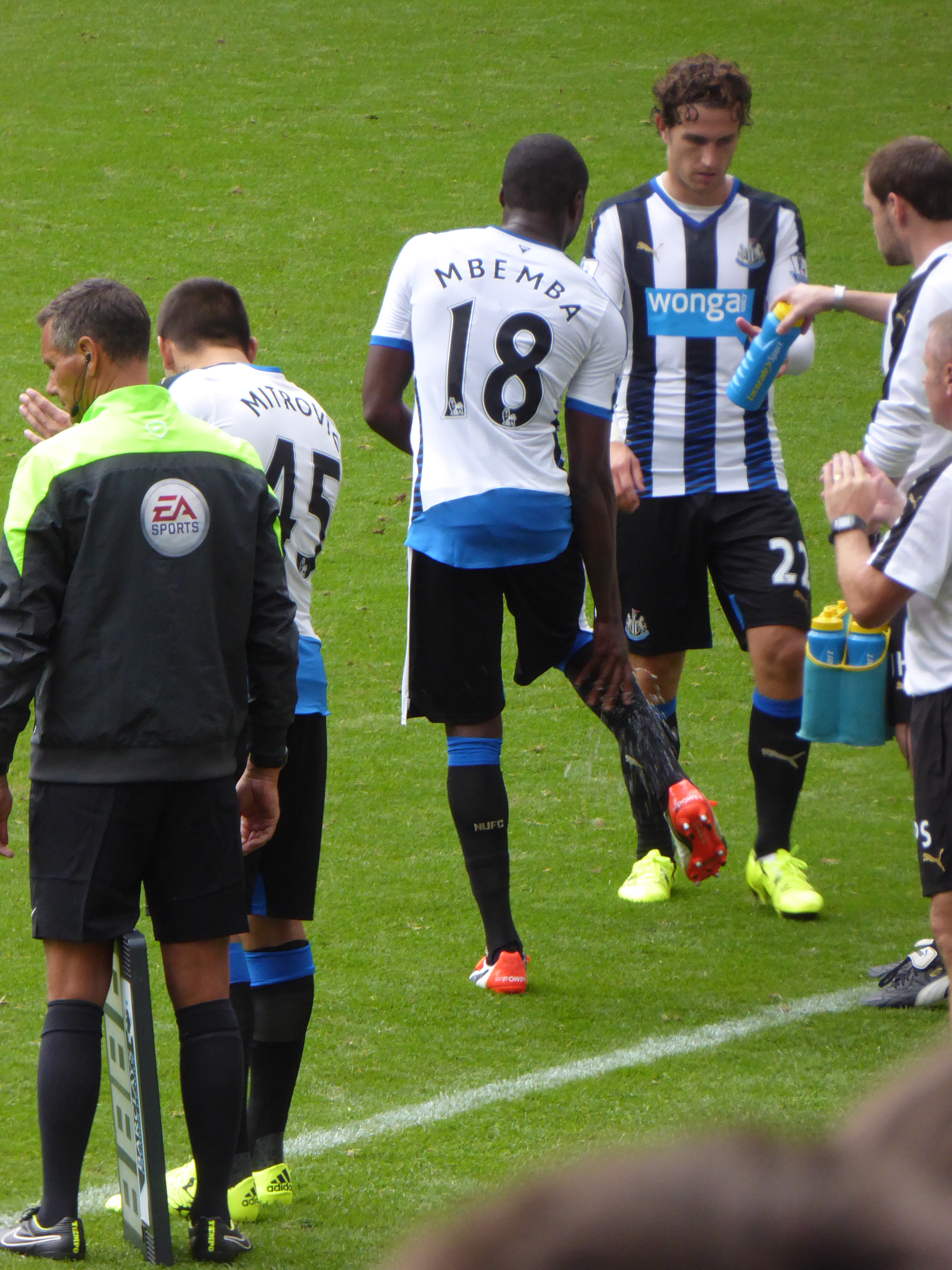
Mbemba (number 18) on his Newcastle debut in August 2015

Anderlecht

- Belgian Pro League: 2013–14
- Belgian Super Cup: 2013, 2014
- Belgian Cup runner-up: 2014–15

Newcastle United

- EFL Championship: 2016–17

Porto

- Primeira Liga: 2019–20 2021–22
- Taça de Portugal: 2019–20, 2021–22
- Supertaça Cândido de Oliveira: 2018, 2020
- Taça da Liga runner-up: 2018–19, 2019–20

DR Congo

- Africa Cup of Nations bronze: 2015

Individual

- Primeira Liga Team of the Year: 2021–22
- UNFP Ligue 1 Team of the Year: 2022–23
- Prix Marc-Vivien Foé: 2022–23
- CAF Team of the Year: 2023, 2024
- Africa Cup of Nations Team of the Tournament: 2023

== See also ==
- List of men's footballers with 100 or more international caps
