= João Bonani =

Brazilian footballer

João Vítor Bonani
Personal information
- Full name: João Vítor Bonani Rodrigues
- Date of birth: 25 October 1998 (age 28)
- Place of birth: Araraquara, Brazil
- Height: 1.80 m (5 ft 11 in)
- Position: Forward

Team information
- Current team: Casa Pia

Youth career
- 2011–2015: Senhora da Hora
- 2015–2016: Salgueiros
- 2016–2017: Lavrense
- 2017–2019: Sporting Covilhã
- 2017–2018: → Maia Lidador (loan)

Senior career*
Years	Team	Apps	(Gls)
2017–2020	Sporting Covilhã	47	(4)
2021–	Casa Pia	5	(0)
2021	→ Estrela da Amadora (loan)	8	(0)
- * Club domestic league appearances and goals as of 6 June 2021

João Vítor Bonani Rodrigues (born 25 October 1998) is a Brazilian professional footballer who plays as a forward. He is under contract with the Portuguese club Casa Pia.

== Football career ==
On 21 July 2018, Bonani made his professional debut with Sporting Covilhã in a 2018–19 Taça da Liga match against Mafra.
