= Wilson Kenidy =

Angolan footballer

Personal information
- Full name: Wilson Kenidy Correia Silva
- Date of birth: 2 February 1993 (age 33)
- Place of birth: Luanda, Angola
- Height: 1.78 m (5 ft 10 in)
- Position: Winger

Team information
- Current team: Lusitano de Évora
- Number: 14

Youth career
- 2007–2010: Casa Pia
- 2010–2012: Belenenses

Senior career*
Years	Team	Apps	(Gls)
2012–2013	→ Casa Pia (loan)	27	(3)
2012–2015	Casa Pia	54	(10)
2015–2018	Doxa Katokopias	80	(4)
2018–2019	Louletano	17	(2)
2019–2020	Casa Pia	26	(3)
2020-2021	Cova da Piedade	8	(1)
2021	Oliveirense	13	(0)
2021–2022	Real SC	27	(5)
2022–2023	Oliveira do Hospital	21	(1)
2023–2024	Oriental	26	(4)
2024–	Lusitano de Évora	9	(0)
- * Club domestic league appearances and goals as of 23:32, 1 February 2025 (UTC)

Wilson Kenidy Correia Silva (born 2 February 1993), known as Wilson Kenidy, is an Angolan footballer who plays as a left winger for Portuguese club Lusitano de Évora.
