= Sérgio Oliveira =

Portuguese footballer (born 1992)

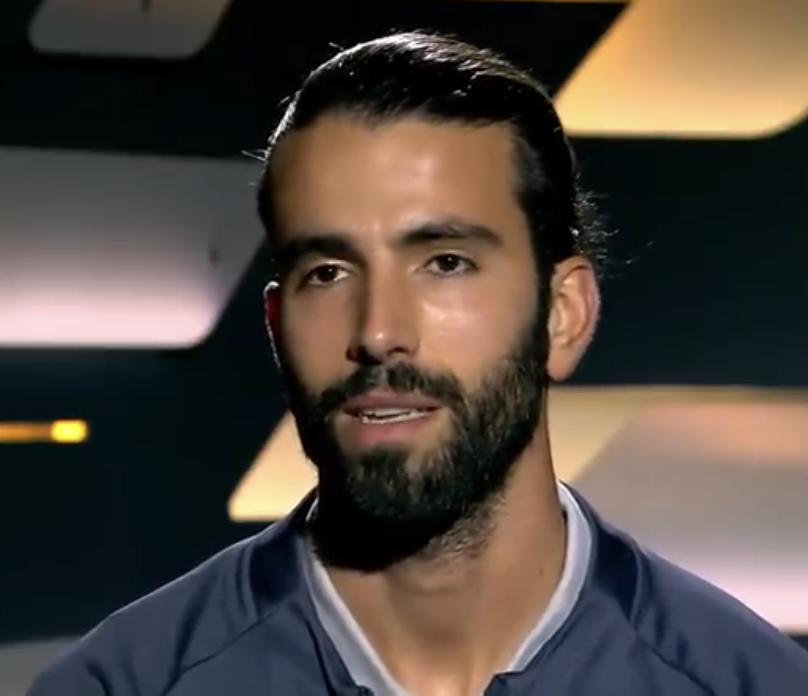
- Oliveira in 2022

Personal information
- Full name: Sérgio Miguel Relvas de Oliveira
- Date of birth: 2 June 1992 (age 34)
- Place of birth: Paços de Brandão, Portugal
- Height: 1.81 m (5 ft 11 in)
- Position: Central midfielder

Youth career
- 2000–2002: Paços Brandão
- 2002–2010: Porto
- 2007–2008: → Padroense (loan)

Senior career*
Years	Team	Apps	(Gls)
2009–2014	Porto	0	(0)
2010–2011	→ Beira-Mar (loan)	6	(0)
2011	→ Mechelen (loan)	6	(1)
2012	→ Penafiel (loan)	12	(2)
2012–2013	Porto B	36	(6)
2013–2014	→ Paços Ferreira (loan)	30	(2)
2014–2015	Paços Ferreira	26	(2)
2015–2022	Porto	102	(25)
2017	→ Nantes (loan)	6	(0)
2019	→ PAOK (loan)	11	(3)
2019	Porto B	1	(0)
2022	→ Roma (loan)	14	(2)
2022–2024	Galatasaray	44	(5)
2024–2025	Olympiacos	9	(0)
2025	Sport Recife	24	(1)

International career
2008–2009	Portugal U17	15	(0)
2008–2009	Portugal U18	4	(1)
2009–2010	Portugal U19	13	(3)
2010–2012	Portugal U20	20	(3)
2012–2015	Portugal U21	23	(3)
2016	Portugal Olympic (O.P.)	3	(0)
2018–2021	Portugal	13	(0)
Medal record
Men's football
Representing Portugal
FIFA U-20 World Cup
Runner-up	2011 Colombia
UEFA European Under-21 Championship
Runner-up	2015 Czech Republic
- * Club domestic league appearances and goals as of 23:02, 27 December 2025 (UTC)

Sérgio Miguel Relvas de Oliveira CvIH (born 2 June 1992) is a Portuguese professional footballer who plays as a central midfielder.

He spent the better part of his career with Porto after making his first-team debut at the age of 17, going on to appear in 174 competitive matches and win three Primeira Liga championships, three Taça de Portugal and two Supertaça Cândido de Oliveira. He was also loaned to Beira-Mar, Mechelen, Penafiel, Nantes, PAOK and Roma, winning another double with PAOK in the 2018–19 season and the Europa Conference League with Roma in 2022. In the Portuguese top division, he also represented Paços de Ferreira.

Oliveira finished second at the 2015 European Under-21 Championship with Portugal. He made his senior debut in 2018, being part of the squad at Euro 2020.

== Club career ==
=== Porto ===
Born in Paços de Brandão, Santa Maria da Feira, Aveiro District, Oliveira arrived at Porto's youth system in 2002, at the age of 10. On 17 October 2009, he became the club's youngest ever player to appear for the first team, at the age of 17 years, four months and 15 days, in a 4–0 home win against Sertanense in the third round of the Taça de Portugal; during the game, he provided an assist for Hulk in one of the goals. He signed a renewed contract the following month, running until June 2012 with a €30 million buyout clause.

Oliveira was loaned to Beira-Mar of the Primeira Liga for the 2010–11 campaign. He debuted in the competition on 23 October 2010, playing one minute in a 1–1 away draw with Paços de Ferreira.

In the summer of 2011, still owned by Porto, Oliveira was deemed surplus to requirements by new manager Vítor Pereira as practically all Portuguese players, and joined Belgian Pro League club Mechelen. He scored his first career goals on 21 September in the sixth round of the national cup away to Oostende, two in a 3–0 victory; his one goal of the league season was a consolation in a 3–2 loss at Standard Liège on 25 November. In the following transfer window, in the same situation, he returned to his country and signed for Penafiel in the Segunda Liga.

=== Paços Ferreira ===
Oliveira agreed to a three-year contract with Paços de Ferreira for 2013–14, also in the Portuguese top tier. In each of his two seasons, the first spent on loan, he scored twice in the league.

=== Return to Porto ===
After having been sold back to Porto before the start of the 2015–16 campaign, Oliveira scored his first competitive goal for the side on 3 February 2016, helping to a 3–0 away defeat of Gil Vicente in the semi-finals of the domestic cup. Late into the 2017 January transfer window, he was loaned to Nantes as the French side was coached by compatriot Sérgio Conceição, who subsequently would be his boss at Porto.

Oliveira was a very important unit for the 2017–18 national champions, first rising to prominence after a remarkable performance against Monaco in the group stage of the UEFA Champions League. His importance grew even further as he spent the final stretch of the season as a starter, forming a revamped midfield partnership with Héctor Herrera after Danilo Pereira suffered a serious injury which ruled him out for several months.

Oliveira still took the field in the 2018 edition of the Supertaça Cândido de Oliveira, a 3–1 victory over Aves. On 31 January 2019, having ceased to be part of Conceição's plans, he joined PAOK on a five-month loan deal. On 18 February, he contributed to a 5–1 Super League Greece rout at Apollon Smyrnis for his first goal. He added two more the following month in wins against Atromitos (3–0) and Xanthi (2–1), and eventually helped the club conquer the double for the first time in its history.

In the 2019–20 campaign, Oliveira played 34 games in all competitions and scored five times to win another double, edging Benfica on both domestic fronts. In the final of the Portuguese Cup, he came on as an 80th-minute substitute for Jesús Corona as his team (reduced to ten men since the end of the first half) held on to a 2–1 victory in Coimbra.

Oliveira achieved a career-best 20 goals in 2020–21. On 9 March 2021, he scored a brace in a 3–2 loss after extra-time to Juventus in the Champions League round of 16 – an early penalty and a 115th-minute free kick – to qualify his team on the away goals rule. Consequently, he was given the "Dragão de Ouro" award for Porto's footballer of the year.

Subsequently, Oliveira attracted interest from clubs such as Fiorentina, Roma and Tottenham Hotspur. As the summer transfer window closed, no moves materialised, and he began the 2021–22 season on the bench, as fellow youth graduate Bruno Costa who had just been re-signed started in his place. However, after scoring a late winner in a 2–1 league victory against Gil Vicente, he returned to the starting eleven.

On 12 January 2022, Oliveira joined Serie A club Roma, coached by his compatriot José Mourinho; the €1 million loan deal included a €13.5 million buying option at the end of the campaign. He scored on his debut four days later, his 33rd-minute penalty being the only goal of the home fixture with Cagliari. He made six appearances as the Giallorossi won the inaugural edition of the UEFA Europa Conference League, and scored the only goal in the last-16 first leg away to Vitesse in which he was also sent off; he replaced the injured Henrikh Mkhitaryan after a quarter of an hour in the final on 25 May in another single-goal win over a Dutch side, Feyenoord.

=== Galatasaray ===
On 9 July 2022, Galatasaray announced the signing of Oliveira on a four-year contract. He made his Süper Lig debut on 7 August, starting as the season began with a 1–0 win at Antalyaspor. His first goal came on 16 September to open a 2–1 home victory over Konyaspor in 59 seconds; he won the domestic league in his first season, confirming it with two games to spare in a 4–1 away defeat of Ankaragücü where he scored.

Oliveira tore a chest muscle in training in December 2023, being sidelined for several months following surgery. On 4 September 2024, he left by mutual consent.

=== Later career ===
Immediately after leaving Galatasaray, Oliveira joined Greek top-tier Olympiacos. On 19 February 2025, he joined Campeonato Brasileiro Série A club Sport Recife on a deal until December 2026; he was released ten months later, however, having totalled 29 matches, two goals and two assists for the bottom-placed side.

== International career ==
Oliveira was selected by the Portugal under-19 team for the 2010 UEFA European Championship; in the tournament in France, he scored in a 2–0 group stage victory over Italy as both nations went on to be eliminated after the first three games. He was also part of the under-20 side at the 2011 FIFA World Cup in Colombia, finishing in second place.

Oliveira was the captain of the under-21s at the 2015 European Championship in the Czech Republic. He hit the crossbar in the first half of the final against Sweden, and was replaced as they went on to lose in a penalty shootout after a 0–0 draw in Prague.

Oliveira was selected by full side manager Fernando Santos to a preliminary 35-man squad for the 2018 FIFA World Cup, but he did not make the final cut. He won his first cap on 6 September of that year, replacing William Carvalho for the final ten minutes of a 1–1 friendly draw with Croatia in São João da Venda, Algarve. His maiden competitive appearance took place four days later, when he came on for the same player late into a 1–0 win over Italy for the UEFA Nations League.

On 20 May 2021, Oliveira was named in the squad for UEFA Euro 2020. He made his debut in the competition on 23 June, in a 2–2 draw against France which closed the group stage.

In October 2022, Oliveira was included in a preliminary 55-man squad for the 2022 World Cup in Qatar.

== Personal life ==
Oliveira married Cristiana Gonçalves Pereira at Porto's Church of Our Lady of Lapa in June 2019. He thanked Julen Lopetegui for often leaving him on the Estádio do Dragão stands when the Spaniard was manager in 2015–16, as it was there that he met his wife.

== Career statistics ==
=== Club ===
As of match played 7 December 2025

Appearances and goals by club, season and competition
Club	Season	League			National cup (Note: Includes Taça de Portugal, Belgian Cup, Greek Cup, Coppa Italia, Turkish Cup, Copa do Brasil)		League cup (Note: Includes Taça da Liga)		Continental		Other		Total	
Club	Season	Division	Apps	Goals	Apps	Goals	Apps	Goals	Apps	Goals	Apps	Goals	Apps	Goals
Porto	2009–10	Primeira Liga	0	0	1	0	3	0	0	0	0	0	4	0
Beira-Mar (loan)	2010–11	Primeira Liga	6	0	2	0	4	0	—		—		12	0
Mechelen (loan)	2011–12	Belgian Pro League	6	1	2	2	—		—		—		8	3
Penafiel (loan)	2011–12	Segunda Liga	12	2	0	0	1	1	—		—		13	3
Porto B	2012–13	Segunda Liga	36	6	—		—		—		—		36	6
Paços Ferreira	2013–14	Primeira Liga	30	2	2	1	2	1	6 (Note: Appearances in UEFA Europa League)	0	2 (Note: Appearances in Primeira Liga relegation play-offs)	0	42	4
Paços Ferreira	2014–15	Primeira Liga	26	2	1	0	0	0	—		—		27	2
Paços Ferreira	Total		56	4	3	1	2	1	6	0	2	0	69	6
Porto	2015–16	Primeira Liga	9	2	5	1	3	0	1	0	—		18	3
Porto	2016–17	Primeira Liga	1	0	0	0	0	0	1 (Note: Appearances in UEFA Champions League)	0	—		2	0
Porto	2017–18	Primeira Liga	19	4	2	0	1	0	5	0	—		27	4
Porto	2018–19	Primeira Liga	8	1	3	0	1	0	4	1	1 (Note: Appearance in Supertaça Cândido de Oliveira)	0	17	2
Porto	2019–20	Primeira Liga	20	3	5	1	4	0	5 (Note: Two appearances and one goal in UEFA Champions League, three appearances in UEFA Europa League)	1	—		34	5
Porto	2020–21	Primeira Liga	32	13	6	1	1	0	8	5	1	1	48	20
Porto	2021–22	Primeira Liga	13	2	3	2	2	0	6	1	—		24	5
Porto	Total		102	25	24	5	12	0	30	8	2	1	170	39
Nantes (loan)	2016–17	Ligue 1	6	0	0	0	0	0	—		—		6	0
PAOK (loan)	2018–19	Super League Greece	11	3	4	0	—		—		—		15	3
Porto B	2019–20	LigaPro	1	0	—		—		—		—		1	0
Roma (loan)	2021–22	Serie A	14	2	2	0	—		6 (Note: Appearances in UEFA Europa Conference League)	1	—		22	3
Galatasaray	2022–23	Süper Lig	32	4	2	0	—		—		—		34	4
Galatasaray	2023–24	Süper Lig	12	1	1	0	—		11 (Note: Ten appearances and one goal in UEFA Europa Conference League, one appearance in UEFA Europa League)	1	0	0	24	2
Galatasaray	Total		44	5	3	0	—		11	1	0	0	58	6
Olympiacos	2024–25	Super League Greece	9	0	2	0	—		3	0	—		14	0
Sport Recife	2025	Série A	19	1	1	0	—		—		9 (Note: Five appearances in Campeonato Pernambucano, four appearances and one goal in Copa do Nordeste)	1	29	2
Career total			322	49	44	8	22	2	56	10	13	2	457	71

=== International ===
Appearances and goals by national team and year
National team	Year	Apps	Goals
Portugal	2018	3	0
Portugal	2020	4	0
Portugal	2021	6	0
Total		13	0

== Honours ==
Porto

- Primeira Liga: 2017–18, 2019–20, 2021–22
- Taça de Portugal: 2009–10, 2019–20, 2021–22
- Supertaça Cândido de Oliveira: 2018, 2020

PAOK

- Super League Greece: 2018–19
- Greek Football Cup: 2018–19

Roma

- UEFA Europa Conference League: 2021–22

Galatasaray

- Süper Lig: 2022–23, 2023–24

Olympiacos

- Super League Greece: 2024–25
- Greek Football Cup: 2024–25

Sport Recife

- Campeonato Pernambucano: 2025

Portugal U20

- FIFA U-20 World Cup runner-up: 2011

Portugal U21

- UEFA European Under-21 Championship runner-up: 2015

Individual

- Primeira Liga Team of the Year: 2020–21
- UEFA Champions League Squad of the Season: 2020–21
- FC Porto Player of the Year: 2020–21

Orders

- Knight of the Order of Prince Henry
