= Mouhamed Mbaye =

Senegalese footballer

Personal information
- Date of birth: 13 October 1997 (age 29)
- Place of birth: Dakar, Senegal
- Height: 1.93 m (6 ft 4 in)
- Position: Goalkeeper

Team information
- Current team: Varzim
- Number: 51

Youth career
- 2012–2015: Aspire Academy
- 2015–2017: Porto

Senior career*
Years	Team	Apps	(Gls)
2017–2021	Porto B	26	(0)
2020–2021	Porto	1	(0)
2021–2024	Académico Viseu	3	(0)
2024–	Varzim	44	(0)

International career
2017	Senegal U20	4	(0)
- * Club domestic league appearances and goals as of 7 May 2026

Mouhamed Mbaye (born 13 October 1997), known as Momo Mbaye, is a Senegalese professional footballer who plays as a goalkeeper for Portuguese club Varzim.

== Career ==
Mbaye made his professional debut with FC Porto B in a 3–1 LigaPro home win over Real S.C. on 1 November 2017.

On 10 November 2019, Mbaye was called up to FC Porto's first team for the first time, remaining unused in their 1–0 win away to city neighbours Boavista F.C. in the Primeira Liga; regular substitute goalkeeper Diogo Costa was playing in place of the injured Agustín Marchesín. He made his debut the following 20 July in a 6–1 home win for the already-crowned champions against Moreirense FC, as a 79th-minute substitute for Costa.
