= Zézinho (footballer, born 1995) =

Portuguese footballer

Personal information
- Full name: Inácio José Trocado Marques
- Date of birth: 2 November 1995 (age 31)
- Place of birth: Póvoa de Varzim, Portugal
- Height: 1.80 m (5 ft 11 in)
- Position: Left-back

Team information
- Current team: São João de Ver
- Number: 26

Youth career
- 2003–2014: Varzim

Senior career*
Years	Team	Apps	(Gls)
2014–2016	Varzim B	69	(5)
2016–2017	Tirsense	36	(2)
2017–2019	Castelo Branco	62	(4)
2019–2020	Cova da Piedade	0	(0)
2019–2020	→ Castelo Branco (loan)	19	(1)
2020–2021	Torreense	17	(1)
2021–2023	Canelas	47	(3)
2023–	São João de Ver	9	(0)
- * Club domestic league appearances and goals as of 23:08, 9 November 2023 (UTC)

Inácio José Trocado Marques (born 2 November 1995), known as Zézinho, is a Portuguese professional footballer who plays as a left-back for Campeonato de Portugal club São João de Ver.

== Career ==
Zézinho made his Taça da Liga debut for Cova da Piedade on 28 July 2019 in a game against Leixões.
