= Alex Telles =

Brazilian footballer (born 1992)

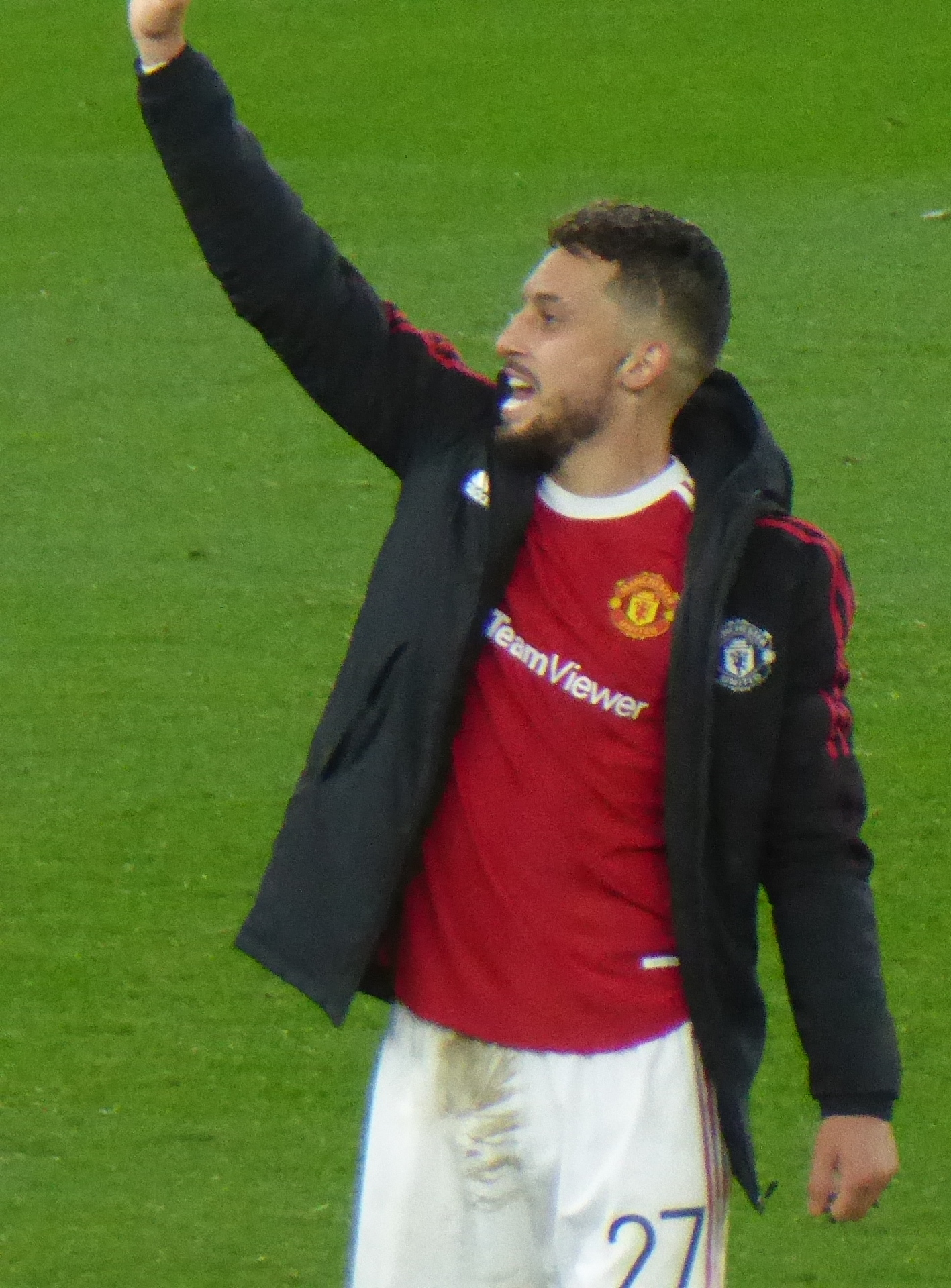
- Telles with Manchester United in 2021

Personal information
- Full name: Alex Nicolao Telles
- Date of birth: 15 December 1992 (age 33)
- Place of birth: Caxias do Sul, Rio Grande do Sul, Brazil
- Height: 1.81 m (5 ft 11 in)
- Position: Left-back

Team information
- Current team: Botafogo
- Number: 13

Youth career
- 2007–2011: Juventude

Senior career*
Years	Team	Apps	(Gls)
2011–2012	Juventude	28	(2)
2013–2014	Grêmio	42	(1)
2014–2016	Galatasaray	39	(2)
2015–2016	→ Inter Milan (loan)	21	(0)
2016–2020	Porto	129	(21)
2020–2023	Manchester United	30	(1)
2022–2023	→ Sevilla (loan)	27	(0)
2023–2024	Al-Nassr	29	(2)
2024–	Botafogo	70	(9)

International career^{‡}
2019–	Brazil	12	(0)
- * Club domestic league appearances and goals as of 23:16, 19 September 2026 (UTC) ‡ National team caps and goals as of 23:11, 20 June 2023 (UTC)

Alex Nicolao Telles (Brazilian Portuguese: [aˈlɛks ˈtɛlis]; born 15 December 1992) is a Brazilian professional footballer who plays as a left-back for Campeonato Brasileiro Série A club Botafogo and the Brazil national team.

Telles started his career at Brazilian Série D side Juventude, before being sold to Série A side Grêmio in 2013. That year, he was voted the best left-back in the league. In January 2014, Telles signed with Turkish Süper Lig club Galatasaray, winning various trophies including a league title, two Turkish Cups and the Turkish Super Cup, only to be loaned to Serie A team Inter Milan during the 2015–16 season.

In July 2016, Telles was sold to Primeira Liga side Porto, where he established himself as one of the best left-backs in the league. He made almost 200 appearances for Porto and won four trophies, including two league titles, one Taça de Portugal and one Supertaça Cândido de Oliveira, as well as being named in the Primeira Liga Team of the Year for three consecutive seasons. Telles' performances sparked the interest of several European clubs, and in October 2020, he signed for Manchester United for an initial €18 million (£15.4 million).

Born in Brazil, Telles also holds Italian citizenship, but ended up representing Brazil at international level. He made his senior international debut in 2019.

== Club career ==
=== Juventude and Grêmio ===
Telles was born in Caxias do Sul, a city in the Brazilian state of Rio Grande do Sul. At the age of eight, he began playing football with the neighbouring kids and was later enrolled to a youth academy of Juventude.

Telles began his professional career with Juventude, making his debut on 24 January 2011 against São José-PA. He scored his first goal on 20 August in a 1–1 home draw against Cruzeiro.

In December, Telles was transferred to Grêmio after a partnership was established with Juventude. He made his Grêmio debut on 3 February 2013 against Internacional. On 26 May, Telles made his Série A debut, starting in a 2–0 home win against Náutico.

=== Galatasaray ===
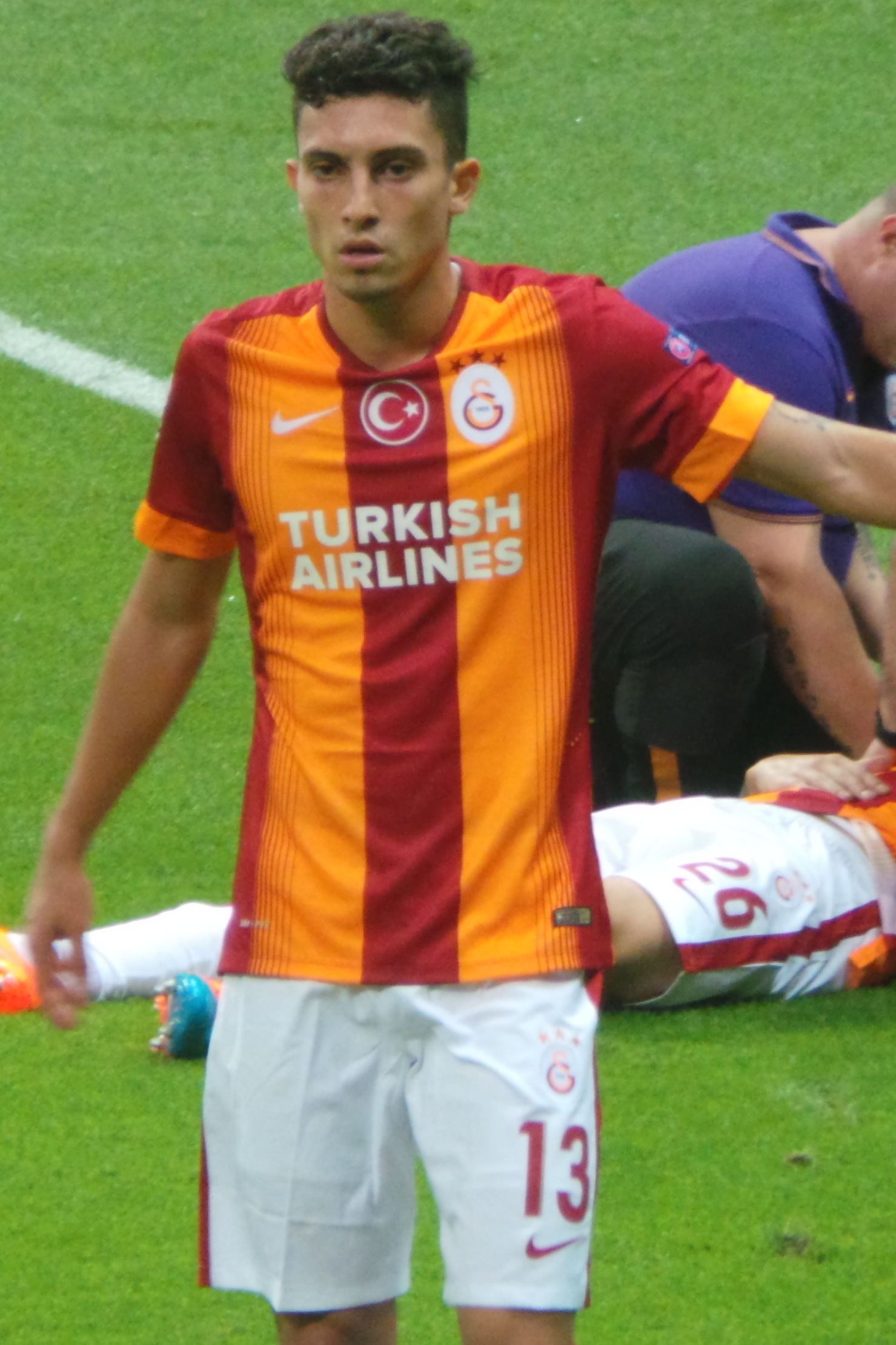
Telles with Galatasaray in 2014

On 22 January 2014, after long negotiations, Telles completed a move to Turkish club Galatasaray for €6 million, signing a contract that would keep him with the club until 2018. He made his debut two weeks later, starting in a 3–0 win against Tokatspor for the campaign's Turkish Cup, and made his maiden Süper Lig debut in a 3–0 home victory against Eskişehirspor on 8 February 2014. Telles made his first assist for the club against Antalyaspor in a 2–2 away game on 17 February. He also scored his first goal for Galatasaray against Akhisar Belediyespor on 8 March in a 6–1 home win.

In August 2015, there were rumours mentioning Telles as a good choice to fill the place made by the departure of left-back Filipe Luís at Chelsea. In response to the rumour, Galatasaray manager Hamza Hamzaoğlu said the club would only be tempted by an acceptable offer.

==== Loan to Inter Milan ====
On 31 August 2015, Galatasaray agreed to let Telles join Italian club Internazionale of Serie A on a one-year loan for a €1.3 million fee, in addition to €250,000 if Inter qualify for the group stage of the 2016–17 UEFA Champions League. The deal included a buyout option for €8.5 million, letting Internazionale make the move permanent when the loan deal is finished. Telles reunited with Internazionale manager Roberto Mancini in Italy, who previously coached him at Galatasaray.

He made his debut for the club on 13 September in the 2015–16 Serie A matchday 3 against city rivals Milan, playing the entirety of the match as Inter won 1–0.

=== Porto ===
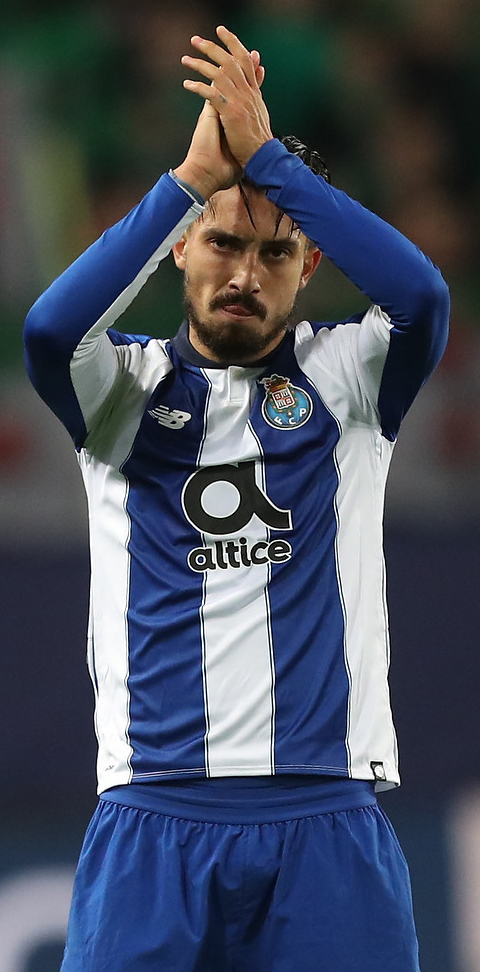
Telles playing for Porto in 2018

On 12 July 2016, Portuguese side Porto announced the signing of Telles for a €6.5 million fee. According to a Galatasaray press release, the Istanbul club reserved a further 10% of any added value in a future transfer deal. The following day, after signing a five-year contract, he stated: "I ambition titles, I ambition a very beautiful story. I have recently commented with my relatives that I do not want to come here in passing, I want to leave a legacy." On 12 August, in a 3–1 away win against Rio Ave, he marked his league debut and first competitive match with a poor performance and subsequent expulsion. Despite the rough start, Telles gradually cemented himself in the team's starting eleven, scoring his first goal when facing rivals Boavista in a 3–1 home victory at the Estádio do Dragão.

=== Manchester United ===
On 5 October 2020, Manchester United had agreed a deal in principle to sign Telles for a fee believed to be £15.4 million. The transfer was completed and Telles was announced as a United player that day. He made his debut playing as a left wing-back on 20 October in a 2–1 win over Paris Saint-Germain in the UEFA Champions League group stage. On 29 September 2021, Telles scored his first goal for Manchester United with a left-footed volley from outside the penalty area in a 2–1 home win against Villarreal in the 2021–22 UEFA Champions League group stage.

==== Loan to Sevilla ====
On 4 August 2022, Telles was loaned to La Liga club Sevilla until the end of the 2022–23 season.

=== Al-Nassr ===
On 23 July 2023 Alex Telles was introduced by Al-Nassr, signing a contract valid until 2025. According to European media, the transfer fee was approximately €7 million (R$38 million).

On 25 July, head coach Luís Castro made Telles' debut in a pre-season friendly against Paris Saint-Germain, resulting in a 0–0 tie in Japan.

Despite being used often throughout the 2023-24 season, participating in 40 games, Alex Telles' contract was mutually canceled on 2 September 2024. His contract with the Saudi club was originally scheduled to last until June 2025, the decision was made because of the club's new plans, not because of bad performances by Telles, as he was loved by the fans for how much passion he had for the club.

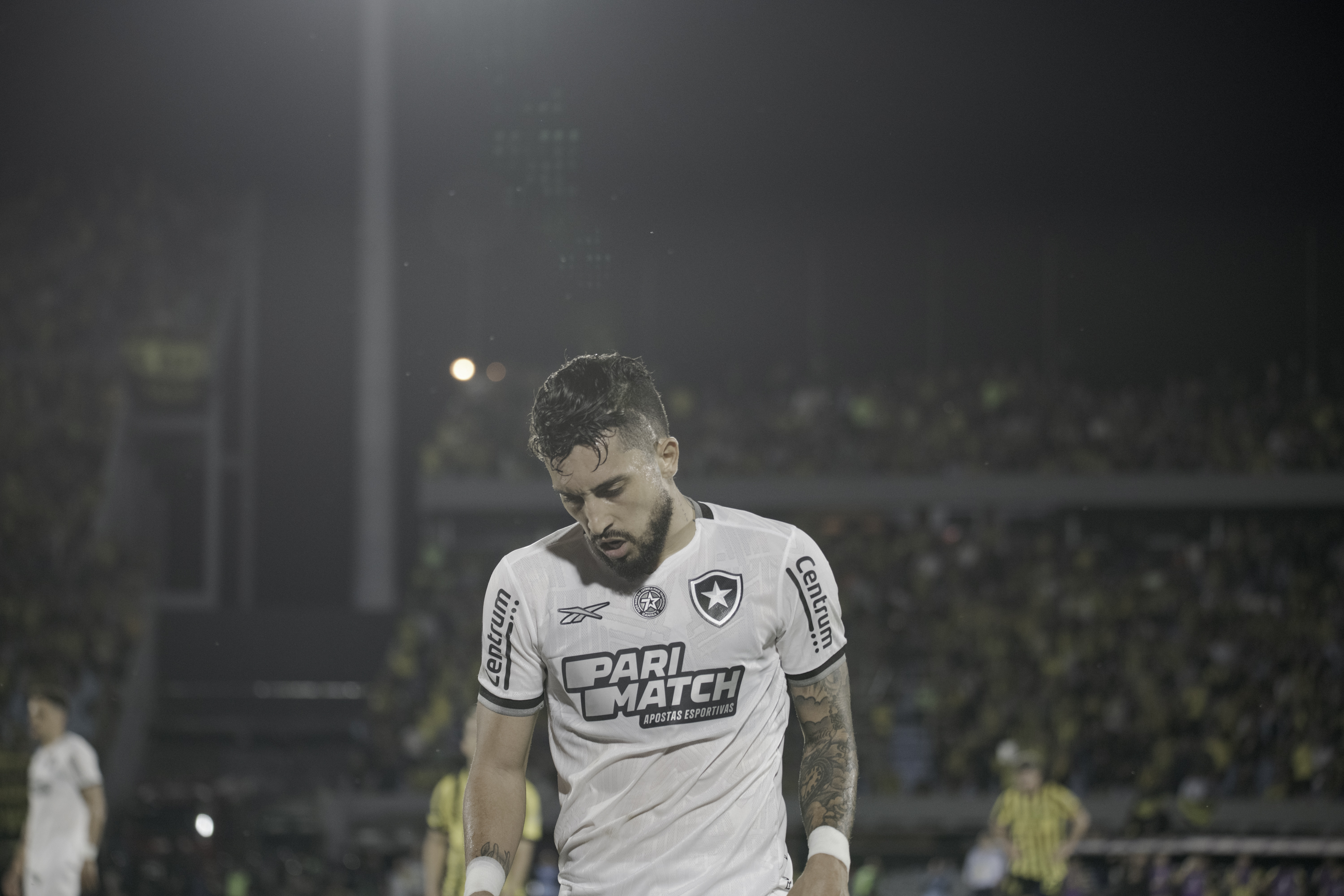
Telles with Botafogo in 2024

=== Botafogo ===
On 3 September 2024, Telles returned to Brazil and signed for Botafogo on a 2-year contract that ends on 31 December 2026. On 1 December, 2024, Telles was named in the starting 11 for Botafogo in the Copa Libertadores final. In that game, Telles scored his first goal for the club in a 3–1 win for a historical title.

== International career ==
Although he was born in Brazil, Telles also has an Italian passport, making him in the past eligible to represent Italy national team. In October 2016, Telles said that he would "welcome" a call-up from the "Azzurri", adding that his great-grandparents are Italian and he feels Italian. In March 2019, however, he received his first call-up to the Brazil national team. He made his debut for Brazil on 23 March 2019 in a friendly against Panama, as a starter.

On 7 November 2022, Telles was named in the squad for the 2022 FIFA World Cup. He was ruled out for the rest of the competition after picking up a right knee injury in the final group stage match against Cameroon.

== Style of play ==
Telles is an offensive full back and is described as a skilled, quick and playmaking defender.

== Career statistics ==
=== Club ===
As of match played 19 September 2026

Appearances and goals by club, season and competition
Club	Season	League			State league (Note: Includes Campeonato Gaúcho, Campeonato Carioca)		National cup (Note: Includes Copa do Brasil, Turkish Cup, Coppa Italia, Taça de Portugal, FA Cup, King's Cup)		League cup (Note: Includes Taça da Liga, EFL Cup)		Continental		Other		Total	
Club	Season	Division	Apps	Goals	Apps	Goals	Apps	Goals	Apps	Goals	Apps	Goals	Apps	Goals	Apps	Goals
Juventude	2011	Série D	4	1	11	0	0	0	—		—		—		15	1
Juventude	2012	Série D	9	1	4	0	2	0	—		—		—		15	1
Juventude	Total		13	2	15	0	2	0	—		—		—		30	2
Grêmio	2013	Série A	36	1	6	0	6	0	—		3 (Note: Appearances in Copa Libertadores)	0	—		51	1
Galatasaray	2013–14	Süper Lig	15	1	—		4	0	—		2 (Note: Appearances in UEFA Champions League)	0	—		21	1
Galatasaray	2014–15	Süper Lig	22	1	—		8	0	—		5	0	1 (Note: Appearance in Turkish Super Cup)	0	36	1
Galatasaray	2015–16	Süper Lig	2	0	—		—		—		—		1	0	3	0
Galatasaray	Total		39	2	—		12	0	—		7	0	2	0	60	2
Inter Milan (loan)	2015–16	Serie A	21	0	—		1	0	—		—		—		22	0
Porto	2016–17	Primeira Liga	32	1	—		2	0	2	0	9	0	—		45	1
Porto	2017–18	Primeira Liga	30	3	—		5	0	3	0	7	1	—		45	4
Porto	2018–19	Primeira Liga	33	4	—		5	1	4	0	10	1	1 (Note: Appearance in Supertaça Cândido de Oliveira)	0	53	6
Porto	2019–20	Primeira Liga	31	11	—		5	1	3	1	10 (Note: Two appearances in UEFA Champions League, eight appearances in UEFA Europa League)	0	—		49	13
Porto	2020–21	Primeira Liga	3	2	—		—		—		—		—		3	2
Porto	Total		129	21	—		17	2	12	1	36	2	1	0	195	26
Manchester United	2020–21	Premier League	9	0	—		3	0	1	0	11 (Note: Four appearances in UEFA Champions League, seven appearances in UEFA Europa League)	0	—		24	0
Manchester United	2021–22	Premier League	21	0	—		0	0	1	0	4	1	—		26	1
Manchester United	Total		30	0	—		3	0	2	0	15	1	—		50	1
Sevilla (loan)	2022–23	La Liga	27	0	—		0	0	—		11 (Note: Six appearances in UEFA Champions League, five appearances in UEFA Europa League)	0	—		38	0
Al-Nassr	2023–24	Saudi Pro League	27	2	—		4	0	—		2 (Note: Appearances in AFC Champions League)	1	7 (Note: One appearance in Saudi Super Cup, six appearances in Arab Club Champions Cup)	0	40	3
Al-Nassr	2024–25	Saudi Pro League	2	0	—		—		—		—		2 (Note: Appearances in Saudi Super Cup)	0	4	0
Al-Nassr	Total		29	2	—		4	0	—		2	1	9	0	44	3
Botafogo	2024	Série A	11	0	—		—		—		5	1	0	0	16	1
Botafogo	2025	Série A	27	5	3	0	6	2	—		8	0	7 (Note: One appearance in Supercopa do Brasil, two appearances in Recopa Sudamericana, four appearances in FIFA Club World Cup)	0	51	7
Botafogo	2026	Série A	25	3	4	1	2	1	—		10 (Note: Four appearances and one goal in Copa Libertadores, six appearances in Copa Sudamericana)	1	—		41	6
Botafogo	Total		63	8	7	1	8	3	—		23	1	7	0	108	14
Career total			387	36	28	1	53	5	14	1	97	6	19	0	598	49

=== International ===
As of match played 20 June 2023

Appearances and goals by national team and year
National team	Year	Apps	Goals
Brazil	2019	1	0
Brazil	2020	3	0
Brazil	2021	0	0
Brazil	2022	6	0
Brazil	2023	2	0
Total		12	0

== Honours ==
Juventude

- Copa FGF: 2011, 2012

Galatasaray

- Süper Lig: 2014–15
- Turkish Cup: 2013–14, 2014–15
- Turkish Super Cup: 2015

Porto

- Primeira Liga: 2017–18, 2019–20
- Taça de Portugal: 2019–20
- Supertaça Cândido de Oliveira: 2018

Sevilla

- UEFA Europa League: 2022–23

Al-Nassr

- Arab Club Champions Cup: 2023

Botafogo

- Série A: 2024
- Copa Libertadores: 2024

Individual

- Brasileirão Série A Team of the Year – Best Left-back: 2013
- Bola de Prata – Best Left-back: 2013
- Troféu Mesa Redonda Team of the Year: 2013, 2024
- SJPF Primeira Liga Team of the Year: 2016, 2017
- Primeira Liga Player of the Month: February 2020
- Primeira Liga Team of the Year: 2017–18, 2018–19, 2019–20
- Primeira Liga Goal of the Month: October/November 2019
- Primeira Liga top assist provider: 2016–17, 2017–18
- Porto Player of the Year – Dragão de Ouro Award: 2018
- Copa Libertadores Team of the Tournament: 2024
- South American Team of the Year: 2024
