= 2014–15 FC Porto season =

Porto
2014–15 season
- President: Jorge Nuno Pinto da Costa
- Manager: Julen Lopetegui
- Stadium: Estádio do Dragão
- Primeira Liga: 2nd
- Taça de Portugal: Third round
- Taça da Liga: Semi-finals
- UEFA Champions League: Quarter-finals
- Top goalscorer: League: Jackson Martínez (21); All: Jackson Martínez (32)
- Highest home attendance: 50,092 vs Bayern Munich (15 April 2015)
- Lowest home attendance: 11,510 vs União da Madeira (13 January 2015)
- Average home league attendance: 31,847
| Home colours | Away colours | Third colours |

The 2014–15 FC Porto season was the club's 105th competitive season and the 81st consecutive season in the top flight of Portuguese football. For the first time since the 1988–89 season, and the third during the presidency of Jorge Nuno Pinto da Costa, Porto did not win any official competition.

The pre-season began on 3 July 2014 and featured eight preparation matches: four in Portugal (including a presentation match on 27 July against Saint-Étienne) and four abroad, in the Netherlands, Belgium and England.

Porto started the official season on 15 August 2014 with a 2–0 home win against Marítimo for the 2014–15 Primeira Liga. For the first time in nine seasons, the Supertaça Cândido de Oliveira was not Porto's season-opening match, as the club failed to qualify for the 36th edition by not winning the 2013–14 Primeira Liga title or being present in the final of the 2013–14 Taça de Portugal (as Benfica made the double).

Porto also competed in other domestic competitions, such as the Taça de Portugal and the Taça da Liga. Together with the other Primeira Liga teams, they entered the 2014–15 Taça de Portugal in the third round, but were eliminated by Sporting CP after a 3–1 home loss. Beginning their 2014–15 Taça da Liga campaign in the third round, Porto topped their group and qualified for the semi-finals, where they were barred from a third final appearance after losing 2–1 away to Marítimo.

In UEFA competitions, Porto participated in the 2014–15 UEFA Champions League. They reached the group stage for the 19th time after eliminating French side Lille in the play-off round. Porto topped their group and secured qualification for the knockout phase. In the round of 16, they eliminated Basel with an aggregate score of 5–1. In doing so, Porto booked a place in the quarter-finals for the first time since 2008–09, where they faced Bayern Munich. After beating the Germans 3–1 for the first leg, in what was Porto's first-ever home win over Bayern Munich, the team lost the second leg 6–1 and were eliminated with a 7–4 aggregate score. This defeat was their worst ever defeat in UEFA competitions, together with a 6–1 away defeat against AEK Athens in the 1978–79 European Cup.

== Players ==
=== Squad information ===
| N | Pos. | Nat. | Name | Age | EU | Since | App | Goals | Ends | Transfer fee | Notes |
|---|---|---|---|---|---|---|---|---|---|---|---|
| 1 | GK | (Brazil) | Helton | 48 | EU | 2005 | 322 | 0 | 2015 | Undisclosed | Second nationality: Portugal |
| 2 | DF | (Brazil) | Danilo (vice-captain) | 35 | Non-EU | 2011 | 141 | 13 | 2016 | €13M | |
| 3 | DF | (Netherlands) | Bruno Martins Indi | 34 | EU | 2014 | 37 | 2 | 2018 | €7.7M | Second nationality: Portugal |
| 4 | DF | (Brazil) | Maicon (vice-captain) | 38 | Non-EU | 2009 | 168 | 10 | 2017 | Undisclosed | |
| 5 | DF | (Spain) | Iván Marcano | 39 | EU | 2014 | 32 | 0 | 2018 | €2M | |
| 6 | MF | (Brazil) | Casemiro | 34 | Non-EU | 2014 | 41 | 4 | 2015 | N/A | Loan from Real Madrid |
| 7 | FW | (Portugal) | Ricardo Quaresma | 43 | EU | 2004 | 225 | 50 | 2016 | Free | |
| 8 | MF | (Algeria) | Yacine Brahimi | 36 | EU | 2014 | 42 | 13 | 2019 | €6.5M | Second nationality: France |
| 9 | FW | (Colombia) | Jackson Martínez (captain) | 40 | Non-EU | 2012 | 136 | 92 | 2017 | US $11M | |
| 10 | MF | (Colombia) | Juan Quintero | 33 | Non-EU | 2013 | 64 | 7 | 2017 | €5M | |
| 11 | FW | (Spain) | Cristian Tello | 35 | EU | 2014 | 37 | 8 | 2016 | N/A | Loan from Barcelona |
| 12 | GK | (Brazil) | Fabiano | 38 | Non-EU | 2012 | 67 | 0 | 2016 | Undisclosed | |
| 13 | DF | (Mexico) | Diego Reyes | 34 | Non-EU | 2013 | 23 | 0 | 2018 | €7M | |
| 14 | DF | (Spain) | José Ángel | 37 | EU | 2014 | 13 | 0 | 2018 | Free | |
| 15 | MF | (Brazil) | Evandro | 40 | Non-EU | 2014 | 35 | 5 | | €1M | Second nationality: Serbia |
| 16 | MF | (Mexico) | Héctor Herrera | 36 | Non-EU | 2013 | 77 | 10 | 2017 | €8M | |
| 17 | FW | (Portugal) | Hernâni | 35 | EU | 2015 | 10 | 2 | 2019 | €2.9M | |
| 18 | FW | (Spain) | Adrián | 38 | EU | 2014 | 18 | 1 | 2019 | €11M | |
| 21 | FW | (Portugal) | Ricardo Pereira | 33 | EU | 2013 | 34 | 2 | 2019 | €1.6M | Second nationality: Cape Verde |
| 22 | MF | (Spain) | José Campaña | 33 | EU | 2014 | 6 | 0 | 2015 | N/A | Loan from Sampdoria |
| 24 | GK | (Portugal) | Ricardo | 44 | EU | 2014 | 0 | 0 | | Free | |
| 25 | GK | (Spain) | Andrés Fernández | 39 | EU | 2014 | 4 | 0 | 2018 | €1.6M | |
| 26 | DF | (Brazil) | Alex Sandro | 35 | Non-EU | 2011 | 136 | 3 | 2016 | €9.6M | |
| 30 | MF | (Spain) | Óliver | 32 | EU | 2014 | 40 | 7 | 2015 | N/A | Loan from Atlético Madrid |
| 36 | MF | (Portugal) | Rúben Neves | 29 | EU | 2014 | 37 | 1 | 2017 | Youth system | |
| 39 | FW | (Portugal) | Gonçalo Paciência | 32 | EU | 2015 | 4 | 1 | 2016 | Youth system | |
| 80 | FW | (Portugal) | Ivo Rodrigues | 31 | EU | 2015 | 1 | 0 | 2019 | Youth system | |
| 99 | FW | (Cameroon) | Vincent Aboubakar | 34 | Non-EU | 2014 | 20 | 8 | 2018 | €3M | |

- Last updated: 22 May 2015
- Source: FCPorto.pt
- Ordered by squad number.

=== Transfers in ===
| No. | Pos. | Name | Nationality | Age | Previous club | Window | Type | Date | Until | Fee |
|---|---|---|---|---|---|---|---|---|---|---|
| 15 | MF | Evandro | Brazil | 27 | Estoril (Portugal) | Summer | Transfer | 1 July 2014 | 2018 | €2.35M |
| 24 | GK | Ricardo | Portugal | 31 | Académica de Coimbra (Portugal) | Summer | Transfer | 1 July 2014 | — | Free |
| 44 | DF | Daniel Opare | Ghana | 23 | Standard Liège (Belgium) | Summer | Transfer | 1 July 2014 | 2018 | Free |
| — | FW | Leocísio Sami | Guinea-Bissau | 25 | Marítimo (Portugal) | Summer | Transfer | 1 July 2014 | 2018 | Free |
| 30 | MF | Óliver | Spain | 19 | Atlético Madrid (Spain) | Summer | Loan | 3 July 2014 | 2015 | Free |
| 18 | FW | Adrián | Spain | 26 | Atlético Madrid (Spain) | Summer | Transfer | 13 July 2014 | 2019 | €11M (60% rights) |
| 3 | DF | Bruno Martins Indi | Netherlands | 22 | Feyenoord (Netherlands) | Summer | Transfer | 15 July 2014 | 2018 | €7.7M |
| 11 | FW | Cristian Tello | Spain | 22 | Barcelona (Spain) | Summer | Loan | 16 July 2014 | 2016 | Undisclosed |
| 6 | MF | Casemiro | Brazil | 22 | Real Madrid (Spain) | Summer | Loan | 19 July 2014 | 2015 | Free |
| 8 | MF | Yacine Brahimi | Algeria | 24 | Granada (Spain) | Summer | Transfer | 23 July 2014 | 2019 | €6.5M |
| 14 | DF | José Ángel | Spain | 24 | Roma (Italy) | Summer | Transfer | 29 July 2014 | 2018 | Free (50% rights) |
| 25 | GK | Andrés Fernández | Spain | 27 | Osasuna (Spain) | Summer | Transfer | 30 July 2014 | 2018 | Undisclosed |
| 5 | DF | Iván Marcano | Spain | 27 | Rubin Kazan (Russia) | Summer | Transfer | 11 August 2014 | 2018 | €2.65M |
| 99 | FW | Vincent Aboubakar | Cameroon | 22 | Lorient (France) | Summer | Transfer | 24 August 2014 | 2018 | €3M (30% rights) |
| 22 | MF | José Campaña | Spain | 21 | Sampdoria (Italy) | Summer | Loan | 1 September 2014 | 2015 | Free |
| 17 | MF | Otávio | Brazil | 19 | Internacional (Brazil) | Summer | Transfer | 1 September 2014 | 2019 | €2.5M (33% rights) |
| 17 | FW | Hernâni | Portugal | 23 | Vitória de Guimarães (Portugal) | Winter | Transfer | 2 February 2015 | 2019 | €2.9M (75% rights) |

Total expending: ▼€35.7 million

=== Transfers out ===
| No. | Pos. | Name | Nationality | Age | New club | Window | Type | Date | Fee |
|---|---|---|---|---|---|---|---|---|---|
| — | MF | André Castro | Portugal | 26 | Kasımpaşa (Turkey) | Summer | Transfer | 9 May 2014 | €2M |
| — | FW | Juan Iturbe | Argentina | 20 | Hellas Verona (Italy) | Summer | Transfer | 23 May 2014 | €15M (45% rights) |
| 25 | MF | Fernando | Brazil | 26 | Manchester City (England) | Summer | Transfer | 26 June 2014 | €15M (80% rights) |
| — | DF | Jorge Fucile | Uruguay | 29 | Nacional (Uruguay) | Summer | Transfer | 4 July 2014 | Free |
| — | MF | Tozé | Portugal | 21 | Estoril (Portugal) | Summer | Loan | 5 July 2014 | Free |
| — | MF | Marat Izmailov | Russia | 31 | Krasnodar (Russia) | Summer | Loan | 16 July 2014 | Free |
| — | FW | Djalma Campos | Angola | 27 | Konyaspor (Turkey) | Summer | Loan | 20 July 2014 | Free |
| — | GK | Sinan Bolat | Turkey | 25 | Galatasaray (Turkey) | Summer | Loan | 22 July 2014 | Free |
| 19 | FW | Licá | Portugal | 25 | Rayo Vallecano (Spain) | Summer | Loan | 1 August 2014 | Free |
| 23 | DF | Abdoulaye Ba | Senegal | 23 | Rayo Vallecano (Spain) | Summer | Loan | 4 August 2014 | Free |
| 22 | DF | Eliaquim Mangala | France | 23 | Manchester City (England) | Summer | Transfer | 11 August 2014 | €30.5M (56.67% rights) |
| 8 | MF | Josué | Portugal | 23 | Bursaspor (Turkey) | Summer | Loan | 11 August 2014 | Free |
| 35 | MF | Steven Defour | Belgium | 26 | Anderlecht (Belgium) | Summer | Transfer | 13 August 2014 | €6M (90% rights) |
| 17 | FW | Silvestre Varela | Portugal | 29 | West Bromwich Albion (England) | Summer | Loan | 24 August 2014 | Free |
| 20 | MF | Carlos Eduardo | Brazil | 24 | Nice (France) | Summer | Loan | 1 September 2014 | Free |
| 11 | FW | Nabil Ghilas | Algeria | 24 | Córdoba (Spain) | Summer | Loan | 1 September 2014 | Free |
| — | FW | Kléber | Brazil | 24 | Estoril (Portugal) | Summer | Loan | 1 September 2014 | Free |
| — | FW | Leocísio Sami | Guinea-Bissau | 25 | Braga (Portugal) | Summer | Loan | 1 September 2014 | Free |
| 28 | FW | Kelvin | Brazil | 21 | Palmeiras (Brazil) | Winter | Loan | 13 January 2015 | Free |
| 44 | DF | Daniel Opare | Ghana | 24 | Beşiktaş (Turkey) | Winter | Loan | 21 January 2015 | Free |
| 17 | MF | Otávio | Brazil | 19 | Vitória de Guimarães (Portugal) | Winter | Loan | 2 February 2015 | Free |
| 80 | FW | Ivo Rodrigues | Portugal | 19 | Vitória de Guimarães (Portugal) | Winter | Loan | 2 February 2015 | Free |
| — | FW | Leocísio Sami | Guinea-Bissau | 26 | Vitória de Guimarães (Portugal) | Winter | Loan | 2 February 2015 | Free |

Total income: ▲€80.25 million

== Technical staff ==
| Position | Staff |
|---|---|
| Head coach | Julen Lopetegui |
| Assistant coach | Julián Calero; Juan Carlos Martínez; Rui Barros |
| Goalkeeping coach | Juan Carlos Arévalo |
| Fitness coach | Raul Costa |
| Masseur | José Luís |
| Nurse | Eduardo Braga; José Mário Almeida |
| Doctor | Nélson Puga; José Carlos Esteves |
| Medical team | Paulo Colaço; Pedro Vale |
| Director of football | Antero Henrique |

Source: FC Porto

== Pre-season and friendlies ==
Win Draw Loss

| 7 July 2014 Friendly | Porto | 9–0 | Valadares | Olival |
| 17:00 | | | | Stadium: CTFD PortoGaia |

| 12 July 2014 Friendly | Porto | 1–0 | Desportivo das Aves | Olival |
| | Pereira | | | Stadium: CTFD PortoGaia |

| 16 July 2014 Friendly | Venlo | 2–6 | Porto | Venray, Netherlands |
| 18:30 CEST | Wolters 38'; Sevinç 89' | Report | Leemans 52' (o.g.); Josué 62'; Pereira 67'; Carlos Eduardo 74'; Tello 80'; Sami 81' | Stadium: De Wieën; Attendance: 2,000; Referee: Kevin Blom (Netherlands) |

| 19 July 2014 Friendly | Genk | 1–3 | Porto | Genk, Belgium |
| 19:00 CEST | Vossen 10' | Report | Quaresma 8'; Sami 62', 78' | Stadium: Cristal Arena; Referee: Luc Wouters (Belgium) |

| 27 July 2014 Friendly | Porto | 0–0 | Saint-Étienne | Porto |
| 19:00 WEST | | Report | | Stadium: Estádio do Dragão; Attendance: 46,211; Referee: Artur Soares Dias (Portugal) |

| 3 August 2014 Friendly | Everton | 1–1 | Porto | Liverpool, England |
| 16:00 | Naismith 41' | Report | Martínez 56' | Stadium: Goodison Park; Referee: Chris Foy (England) |

| 9 August 2014 Friendly | West Bromwich Albion | 1–3 | Porto | West Bromwich, England |
| 16:00 | Olsson 40' | Report | Casemiro 22'; Martínez 51', 54' | Stadium: The Hawthorns; Attendance: 8,670; Referee: Neil Swarbrick (England) |

== Competitions ==
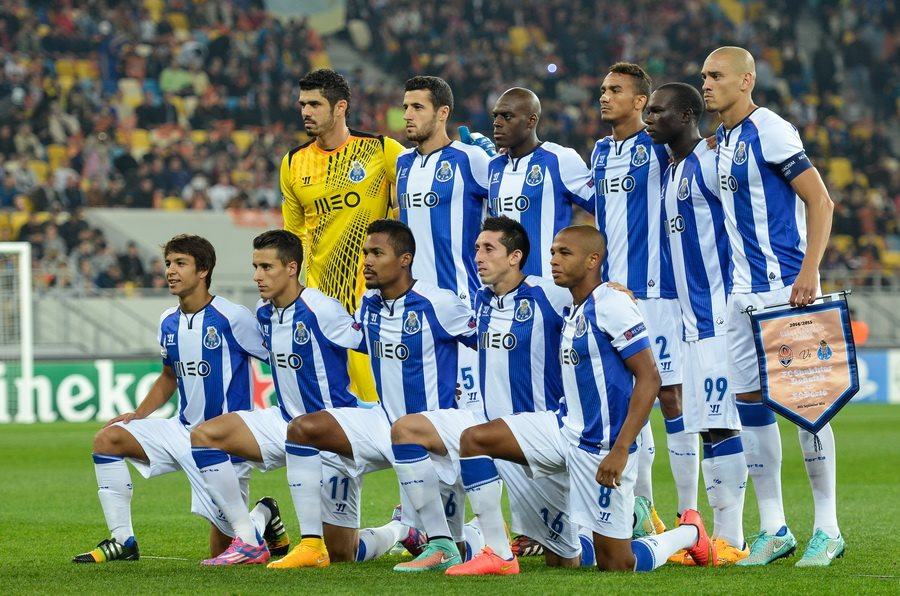
Porto players before UEFA Champions League match against Shakhtar Donetsk

=== Overall record ===
Performance by competition
| Competition | Starting round | Final position/round | First match | Last match |
|---|---|---|---|---|
| Primeira Liga | —N/a | 2nd | 15 August 2014 | 22 May 2015 |
| Taça de Portugal | Third round | Third round | 18 October 2014 | |
| Taça da Liga | Third round | Semi-finals | 30 December 2014 | 2 April 2015 |
| UEFA Champions League | Play-off round | Quarter-finals | 20 August 2014 | 21 April 2015 |

Statistics by competition
| Competition | Pld | W | D | L | GF | GA | GD | Win% |
|---|---|---|---|---|---|---|---|---|
| Primeira Liga | 34 | 25 | 7 | 2 | 74 | 13 | +61 | 73.53 |
| Taça de Portugal | 1 | 0 | 0 | 1 | 1 | 3 | −2 | 0.00 |
| Taça da Liga | 5 | 3 | 1 | 1 | 10 | 5 | +5 | 60.00 |
| UEFA Champions League | 12 | 8 | 3 | 1 | 28 | 12 | +16 | 66.67 |
| Total | 52 | 36 | 11 | 5 | 113 | 33 | +80 | 69.23 |

=== Primeira Liga ===
==== League table ====
| Pos | Team | Pld | W | D | L | GF | GA | GD | Pts | Qualification or relegation |
|---|---|---|---|---|---|---|---|---|---|---|
| 1 | Benfica (C) | 34 | 27 | 4 | 3 | 86 | 16 | +70 | 85 | Qualification for the Champions League group stage |
| 2 | Porto | 34 | 25 | 7 | 2 | 74 | 13 | +61 | 82 | Qualification for the Champions League group stage |
| 3 | Sporting CP | 34 | 22 | 10 | 2 | 67 | 29 | +38 | 76 | Qualification for the Champions League play-off round |
| 4 | Braga | 34 | 17 | 7 | 10 | 55 | 28 | +27 | 58 | Qualification for the Europa League group stage (Note: Since Sporting CP won the 2014–15 Taça de Portugal, the spot awarded to the cup winner (Europa League group stage) was passed to the fourth-placed team and the spot originally meant for the fourth-placed team (Europa League third qualifying round) was given to the sixth-placed team.) |
| 5 | Vitória de Guimarães | 34 | 15 | 10 | 9 | 50 | 35 | +15 | 55 | Qualification for the Europa League third qualifying round |

Source: LPFP
Rules for classification: 1) points; 2) points in matches between tied teams; 3) goal difference in matches between tied teams; 4) away goals in matches between tied teams; 5) goal difference; 6) wins; 7) goals scored. The LPFP decided that only criteria 1, 5, 6 and 7 would be applied to establish the classification during the competition. Qualification for the 2015–16 Europa League has changed: the best-placed non-qualified domestic championship club will enter the UEFA Europa League from the 2015–16 season, rather than the domestic cup runners-up, should the domestic cup winners also qualify for the UEFA Champions League via the final championship standings.
(C) Champions

==== Results by round ====
| Round | 1 | 2 | 3 | 4 | 5 | 6 | 7 | 8 | 9 | 10 | 11 | 12 | 13 | 14 | 15 | 16 | 17 | 18 | 19 | 20 | 21 | 22 | 23 | 24 | 25 | 26 | 27 | 28 | 29 | 30 | 31 | 32 | 33 | 34 |
|---|---|---|---|---|---|---|---|---|---|---|---|---|---|---|---|---|---|---|---|---|---|---|---|---|---|---|---|---|---|---|---|---|---|---|
| Ground | H | A | H | A | H | A | H | A | H | A | H | A | H | H | A | H | A | A | H | A | H | A | H | A | H | A | H | A | H | A | A | H | A | H |
| Result | W | W | W | D | D | D | W | W | W | D | W | W | L | W | W | W | W | L | W | W | W | W | W | W | W | D | W | W | W | D | W | W | D | W |
| Position | 4 | 4 | 3 | 4 | 3 | 2 | 2 | 2 | 2 | 3 | 3 | 2 | 2 | 2 | 2 | 2 | 2 | 2 | 2 | 2 | 2 | 2 | 2 | 2 | 2 | 2 | 2 | 2 | 2 | 2 | 2 | 2 | 2 | 2 |

Updated to match(es) played on 22 May 2015. Source: LPFP
A = Away; H = Home; W = Win; D = Draw; L = Loss

==== Matches ====
| 15 August 2014 1 | Porto | 2–0 | Marítimo | Porto |
| 20:00 WEST (UTC+01:00) | Neves 11'; Martínez 90+4' | Report | | Stadium: Estádio do Dragão; Attendance: 48,036; Referee: Carlos Xistra |

| 24 August 2014 2 | Paços de Ferreira | 0–1 | Porto | Paços de Ferreira |
| 18:00 WEST (UTC+01:00) | | Report | Martínez 40' | Stadium: Estádio da Mata Real; Attendance: 5,785; Referee: Manuel Mota |

| 31 August 2014 3 | Porto | 3–0 | Moreirense | Porto |
| 18:00 WEST (UTC+01:00) | Óliver 70'; Martínez 82', 86' | Report | | Stadium: Estádio do Dragão; Attendance: 35,509; Referee: Bruno Esteves |

| 14 September 2014 4 | Vitória de Guimarães | 1–1 | Porto | Guimarães |
| 17:00 WEST (UTC+01:00) | Mensah 70' (pen.) | Report | Martínez 61' (pen.) | Stadium: Estádio D. Afonso Henriques; Attendance: 25,368; Referee: Paulo Baptista |

| 21 September 2014 5 | Porto | 0–0 | Boavista | Porto |
| 21:00 WEST (UTC+01:00) | | Report | | Stadium: Estádio do Dragão; Attendance: 31,209; Referee: Jorge Ferreira |

| 26 September 2014 6 | Sporting CP | 1–1 | Porto | Lisbon |
| 20:30 WEST (UTC+01:00) | J. Silva 2' | Report | Sarr 56' (o.g.) | Stadium: Estádio José Alvalade; Attendance: 37,999; Referee: Olegário Benquerença |

| 5 October 2014 7 | Porto | 2–1 | Braga | Porto |
| 18:00 WEST (UTC+01:00) | Martins Indi 24'; Quintero 59' | Report | Zé Luís 32' | Stadium: Estádio do Dragão; Attendance: 37,103; Referee: Pedro Proença |

| 25 October 2014 8 | Arouca | 0–5 | Porto | Arouca |
| 20:15 WEST (UTC+01:00) | | Report | Quintero 24'; Martínez 26', 60'; Casemiro 39'; Aboubakar 87' | Stadium: Estádio Municipal de Arouca; Attendance: 2,576; Referee: Carlos Xistra |

| 1 November 2014 9 | Porto | 2–0 | Nacional | Porto |
| 20:15 WET (UTC±00:00) | Danilo 8'; Brahimi 74' | Report | | Stadium: Estádio do Dragão; Attendance: 30,202; Referee: Nuno Almeida |

| 9 November 2014 10 | Estoril | 2–2 | Porto | Estoril |
| 20:15 WET (UTC±00:00) | Kuca 26'; Tozé 80' (pen.) | Report | Brahimi 20'; Óliver 90+4' | Stadium: Estádio António Coimbra da Mota; Attendance: 5,067; Referee: Artur Soares Dias |

| 30 November 2014 11 | Porto | 5–0 | Rio Ave | Porto |
| 20:15 WET (UTC±00:00) | Tello 48'; Martínez 79'; Alex Sandro 89'; Óliver 90+2'; Danilo 90+3' | Report | | Stadium: Estádio do Dragão; Attendance: 30,328; Referee: Olegário Benquerença |

| 6 December 2014 12 | Académica de Coimbra | 0–3 | Porto | Coimbra |
| 20:15 WET (UTC±00:00) | | Report | Martínez 13', 24'; Herrera 47' | Stadium: Estádio Cidade de Coimbra; Attendance: 7,189; Referee: Manuel Mota |

| 14 December 2014 13 | Porto | 0–2 | Benfica | Porto |
| 20:00 WET (UTC±00:00) | | Report | Lima 36', 55' | Stadium: Estádio do Dragão; Attendance: 48,109; Referee: Jorge Sousa |

| 19 December 2014 14 | Porto | 4–0 | Vitória de Setúbal | Porto |
| 20:30 WET (UTC±00:00) | Quaresma 22' (pen.); Martínez 26'; Brahimi 88'; Danilo 90+3' (pen.) | Report | | Stadium: Estádio do Dragão; Attendance: 20,207; Referee: Manuel Oliveira |

| 3 January 2015 15 | Gil Vicente | 1–5 | Porto | Barcelos |
| 20:15 WET (UTC±00:00) | Gonçalves 74' | Report | Casemiro 35'; Martins Indi 55'; Brahimi 70'; Óliver 79'; Martínez 86' | Stadium: Estádio Cidade de Barcelos; Attendance: 5,153; Referee: Nuno Almeida |

| 10 January 2015 16 | Porto | 3–0 | Belenenses | Porto |
| 20:15 WET (UTC±00:00) | Martínez 10'; Óliver 47'; Evandro 90+3' | Report | | Stadium: Estádio do Dragão; Attendance: 26,509; Referee: Manuel Mota |

| 17 January 2015 17 | Penafiel | 1–3 | Porto | Penafiel |
| 20:15 WET (UTC±00:00) | Rabiola 50' | Report | Herrera 30'; Martínez 34'; Óliver 62' | Stadium: Estádio Municipal 25 de Abril; Attendance: 2,477; Referee: Artur Soares Dias |

| 25 January 2015 18 | Marítimo | 1–0 | Porto | Funchal, Madeira |
| 18:00 WET (UTC±00:00) | Gallo 32' | Report | | Stadium: Estádio dos Barreiros; Attendance: 7,091; Referee: João Capela |

| 1 February 2015 19 | Porto | 5–0 | Paços de Ferreira | Porto |
| 20:15 WET (UTC±00:00) | Martínez 29'; Quaresma 39' (pen.), 44'; Herrera 47'; Tello 83' | Report | | Stadium: Estádio do Dragão; Attendance: 24,309; Referee: Marco Ferreira |

| 7 February 2015 20 | Moreirense | 0–2 | Porto | Moreira de Cónegos |
| 20:15 WET (UTC±00:00) | | Report | Martínez 28'; Casemiro 59' | Stadium: Parque de Jogos Comendador Joaquim de Almeida Freitas; Attendance: 4,184; Referee: Carlos Xistra |

| 13 February 2015 21 | Porto | 1–0 | Vitória de Guimarães | Porto |
| 20:30 WET (UTC±00:00) | Brahimi 32' | Report | | Stadium: Estádio do Dragão; Attendance: 26,108; Referee: Nuno Almeida |

| 23 February 2015 22 | Boavista | 0–2 | Porto | Porto |
| 20:00 WET (UTC±00:00) | | Report | Martínez 80'; Brahimi 87' | Stadium: Estádio do Bessa; Attendance: 9,487; Referee: Hugo Miguel |

| 1 March 2015 23 | Porto | 3–0 | Sporting CP | Porto |
| 19:15 WET (UTC±00:00) | Tello 31', 58', 82' | Report | | Stadium: Estádio do Dragão; Attendance: 43,111; Referee: Artur Soares Dias |

| 6 March 2015 24 | Braga | 0–1 | Porto | Braga |
| 20:30 WET (UTC±00:00) | | Report | Tello 72' | Stadium: Estádio Municipal de Braga; Attendance: 16,430; Referee: Jorge Sousa |

| 15 March 2015 25 | Porto | 1–0 | Arouca | Porto |
| 19:15 WET (UTC±00:00) | Aboubakar 32' | Report | | Stadium: Estádio do Dragão; Attendance: 34,199; Referee: Jorge Tavares |

| 21 March 2015 26 | Nacional | 1–1 | Porto | Funchal, Madeira |
| 20:15 WET (UTC±00:00) | Wágner 62' | Report | Tello 45' | Stadium: Estádio da Madeira; Attendance: 3,526; Referee: Manuel Oliveira |

| 6 April 2015 27 | Porto | 5–0 | Estoril | Porto |
| 20:00 WEST (UTC+01:00) | Óliver 33'; Aboubakar 45+1'; Quaresma 52' (pen.), 76'; Danilo 70' | Report | | Stadium: Estádio do Dragão; Attendance: 29,230; Referee: Bruno Esteves |

| 11 April 2015 28 | Rio Ave | 1–3 | Porto | Vila do Conde |
| 18:00 WEST (UTC+01:00) | Tarantini 71' | Report | Quaresma 25' (pen.); Danilo 45+2'; Hernâni 83' | Stadium: Estádio do Rio Ave FC; Attendance: 5,543; Referee: Vasco Santos |

| 18 April 2015 29 | Porto | 1–0 | Académica de Coimbra | Porto |
| 18:00 WEST (UTC+01:00) | Hernâni 11' | Report | | Stadium: Estádio do Dragão; Attendance: 36,117; Referee: Duarte Gomes |

| 26 April 2015 30 | Benfica | 0–0 | Porto | Lisbon |
| 17:00 WEST (UTC+01:00) | | Report | | Stadium: Estádio da Luz; Attendance: 63,534; Referee: Jorge Sousa |

| 3 May 2015 31 | Vitória de Setúbal | 0–2 | Porto | Setúbal |
| 19:15 WEST (UTC+01:00) | | Report | Brahimi 15'; Martínez 90+1' | Stadium: Estádio do Bonfim; Attendance: 4,782; Referee: Marco Ferreira |

| 10 May 2015 32 | Porto | 2–0 | Gil Vicente | Porto |
| 19:15 WEST (UTC+01:00) | Martínez 12', 86' | Report | | Stadium: Estádio do Dragão; Attendance: 25,109; Referee: Bruno Esteves |

| 17 May 2015 33 | Belenenses | 1–1 | Porto | Lisbon |
| 18:00 WEST (UTC+01:00) | Caeiro 85' | Report | Martínez 44' | Stadium: Estádio do Restelo; Attendance: 6,492; Referee: Rui Costa |

| 22 May 2015 34 | Porto | 2–0 | Penafiel | Porto |
| 20:30 WEST (UTC+01:00) | Aboubakar 82'; Danilo 90+2' | Report | | Stadium: Estádio do Dragão; Attendance: 16,009; Referee: Olegário Benquerença |

=== Taça de Portugal ===
==== Third round ====
| 18 October 2014 | Porto | 1–3 | Sporting CP | Porto |
| 17:00 WEST (UTC+01:00) | Martínez 35' | | Marcano 31' (o.g.); Nani 39'; Carrillo 82' | Stadium: Estádio do Dragão; Attendance: 36,869; Referee: Jorge Sousa |

=== Taça da Liga ===
==== Third round ====
| Pos | Team | Pld | W | D | L | GF | GA | GD | Pts | Qualification |
|---|---|---|---|---|---|---|---|---|---|---|
| 1 | Porto | 4 | 3 | 1 | 0 | 9 | 3 | +6 | 10 | Advances to knockout phase |
| 2 | Braga | 4 | 2 | 1 | 1 | 5 | 3 | +2 | 7 | |
| 3 | Académica de Coimbra | 4 | 2 | 0 | 2 | 5 | 6 | −1 | 6 | |
| 4 | União da Madeira | 4 | 2 | 0 | 2 | 6 | 8 | −2 | 6 | |
| 5 | Rio Ave | 4 | 0 | 0 | 4 | 1 | 6 | −5 | 0 | |

Source: LPFP
Rules for classification: Tiebreakers

| 30 December 2014 1 | Rio Ave | 0–1 | Porto | Vila do Conde |
| 19:15 WET (UTC±00:00) | | Report | Aboubakar 61' | Stadium: Estádio do Rio Ave FC; Attendance: 4,230; Referee: Rui Costa |

| 13 January 2015 2 | Porto | 3–1 | União da Madeira | Porto |
| 20:15 WET (UTC±00:00) | Quintero 24'; Quaresma 54'; Evandro 86' (pen.) | Report | Martins 56' | Stadium: Estádio do Dragão; Attendance: 11,510; Referee: Rui Rodrigues |

| 21 January 2015 3 | Braga | 1–1 | Porto | Braga |
| 20:45 WET (UTC±00:00) | Alan 52' (pen.) | Report | Evandro 25' (pen.) | Stadium: Estádio Municipal de Braga; Attendance: 8,393; Referee: Cosme Machado |

| 28 January 2015 4 | Porto | 4–1 | Académica de Coimbra | Porto |
| 20:45 WET (UTC±00:00) | Martínez 6', 59'; Paciência 75'; Evandro 80' (pen.) | Report | Nzola 72' | Stadium: Estádio do Dragão; Attendance: 14,609; Referee: Tiago Martins |

==== Semi-finals ====
| 2 April 2015 | Marítimo | 2–1 | Porto | Funchal, Madeira |
| 19:45 WEST (UTC+01:00) | Gallo 37' (pen.); Marega 45' | Report | Evandro 32' | Stadium: Estádio dos Barreiros; Attendance: 5,127; Referee: Carlos Xistra |

=== UEFA Champions League ===
==== Play-off round ====
| 20 August 2014 1st leg | Lille (France) | 0–1 | (Portugal) Porto | Villeneuve-d'Ascq |
| 20:45 CEST (UTC+02:00) | | Report | Herrera 61' | Stadium: Stade Pierre-Mauroy; Attendance: 33,853; Referee: Björn Kuipers (Netherlands) |

| 26 August 2014 2nd leg | Porto (Portugal) | 2–0 (3–0 agg.) | (France) Lille | Porto |
| 20:45 CEST (UTC+02:00) | Brahimi 49'; Martínez 69' | Report | | Stadium: Estádio do Dragão; Attendance: 45,208; Referee: Svein Oddvar Moen (Norway) |

==== Group stage ====
| Pos | Team | Pld | W | D | L | GF | GA | GD | Pts | Qualification | POR | SHK | ATH | BATE |
|---|---|---|---|---|---|---|---|---|---|---|---|---|---|---|
| 1 | (Portugal) Porto | 6 | 4 | 2 | 0 | 16 | 4 | +12 | 14 | Advance to knockout phase | — | 1–1 | 2–1 | 6–0 |
| 2 | (Ukraine) Shakhtar Donetsk | 6 | 2 | 3 | 1 | 15 | 4 | +11 | 9 | Advance to knockout phase | 2–2 | — | 0–1 | 5–0 |
| 3 | (Spain) Athletic Bilbao | 6 | 2 | 1 | 3 | 5 | 6 | −1 | 7 | Transfer to Europa League | 0–2 | 0–0 | — | 2–0 |
| 4 | (Belarus) BATE Borisov | 6 | 1 | 0 | 5 | 2 | 24 | −22 | 3 | | 0–3 | 0–7 | 2–1 | — |

Source: UEFA
Rules for classification: Group stage tiebreakers

| 17 September 2014 1 | Porto (Portugal) | 6–0 | (Belarus) BATE Borisov | Porto |
| 20:45 CEST (UTC+02:00) | Brahimi 5', 32', 57'; Martínez 37'; Adrián 61'; Aboubakar 76' | Report | | Stadium: Estádio do Dragão; Attendance: 35,108; Referee: Bas Nijhuis (Netherlands) |

| 30 September 2014 2 | Shakhtar Donetsk (Ukraine) | 2–2 | (Portugal) Porto | Lviv |
| 20:45 CEST (UTC+02:00) | Teixeira 52'; Luiz Adriano 85' | Report | Martínez 89' (pen.), 90+4' | Stadium: Arena Lviv; Attendance: 33,217; Referee: Cüneyt Çakır (Turkey) |

| 21 October 2014 3 | Porto (Portugal) | 2–1 | (Spain) Athletic Bilbao | Porto |
| 20:45 CEST (UTC+02:00) | Herrera 45'; Quaresma 75' | Report | Guillermo 58' | Stadium: Estádio do Dragão; Attendance: 38,116; Referee: Damir Skomina (Slovenia) |

| 5 November 2014 4 | Athletic Bilbao (Spain) | 0–2 | (Portugal) Porto | Bilbao |
| 20:45 CET (UTC+01:00) | | Report | Martínez 55'; Brahimi 74' | Stadium: San Mamés; Attendance: 47,243; Referee: Felix Brych (Germany) |

| 25 November 2014 5 | BATE Borisov (Belarus) | 0–3 | (Portugal) Porto | Barysaw |
| 18:00 CET (UTC+01:00) | | Report | Herrera 56'; Martínez 65'; Tello 89' | Stadium: Borisov Arena; Attendance: 10,147; Referee: Ovidiu Haţegan (Romania) |

| 10 December 2014 6 | Porto (Portugal) | 1–1 | (Ukraine) Shakhtar Donetsk | Porto |
| 20:45 CET (UTC+01:00) | Aboubakar 87' | Report | Stepanenko 50' | Stadium: Estádio do Dragão; Attendance: 28,010; Referee: Ruddy Buquet (France) |

==== Round of 16 ====
| 18 February 2015 1st leg | Basel (Switzerland) | 1–1 | (Portugal) Porto | Basel |
| 20:45 CET (UTC+01:00) | González 11' | Report | Danilo 79' (pen.) | Stadium: St. Jakob-Park; Attendance: 34,464; Referee: Mark Clattenburg (England) |

| 10 March 2015 2nd leg | Porto (Portugal) | 4–0 (5–1 agg.) | (Switzerland) Basel | Porto |
| 20:45 CET (UTC+01:00) | Brahimi 14'; Herrera 47'; Casemiro 56'; Aboubakar 76' | Report | | Stadium: Estádio do Dragão; Attendance: 43,108; Referee: Jonas Eriksson (Sweden) |

==== Quarter-finals ====
| 15 April 2015 1st leg | Porto (Portugal) | 3–1 | (Germany) Bayern Munich | Porto |
| 20:45 CEST (UTC+02:00) | Quaresma 3' (pen.), 10'; Martínez 65' | Report | Thiago 28' | Stadium: Estádio do Dragão; Attendance: 50,092; Referee: Carlos Velasco Carballo (Spain) |

| 21 April 2015 2nd leg | Bayern Munich (Germany) | 6–1 (7–4 agg.) | (Portugal) Porto | Munich |
| 20:45 CEST (UTC+02:00) | Thiago 14'; Boateng 22'; Lewandowski 27', 40'; Müller 36'; Alonso 88' | Report | Martínez 73' | Stadium: Allianz Arena; Attendance: 70,000; Referee: Martin Atkinson (England) |

== Statistics ==
=== Squad ===
| No. | Pos. | Nat. | Player | Primeira Liga | | | | | Taça de Portugal | | | | | Taça da Liga | | | | | Europe | | | | | Total | | | | |
| No. | Pos. | Nat. | Player | Apps | Goals | Yellow card | Second yellow card | Red card | Apps | Goals | Yellow card | Second yellow card | Red card | Apps | Goals | Yellow card | Second yellow card | Red card | Apps | Goals | Yellow card | Second yellow card | Red card | Apps | Goals | Yellow card | Second yellow card | Red card |
|---|---|---|---|---|---|---|---|---|---|---|---|---|---|---|---|---|---|---|---|---|---|---|---|---|---|---|---|---|
| 1 | GK | (Brazil) | Helton | 7 | 0 | 0 | 0 | 0 | 0 | 0 | 0 | 0 | 0 | 4 | 0 | 0 | 0 | 0 | 0 | 0 | 0 | 0 | 0 | 11 | 0 | 0 | 0 | 0 |
| 2 | DF | (Brazil) | Danilo | 29 | 6 | 8 | 0 | 0 | 1 | 0 | 1 | 0 | 0 | 1 | 0 | 1 | 0 | 0 | 10 | 1 | 4 | 0 | 0 | 41 | 7 | 14 | 0 | 0 |
| 3 | DF | (Netherlands) | Bruno Martins Indi | 23 | 2 | 5 | 0 | 0 | 0 | 0 | 0 | 0 | 0 | 2 | 0 | 1 | 0 | 0 | 11 | 0 | 0 | 0 | 0 | 36 | 2 | 6 | 0 | 0 |
| 4 | DF | (Brazil) | Maicon | 26 | 0 | 2 | 0 | 1 | 1 | 0 | 0 | 0 | 0 | 1 | 0 | 0 | 0 | 0 | 11 | 0 | 2 | 0 | 0 | 39 | 0 | 4 | 0 | 1 |
| 5 | DF | (Spain) | Iván Marcano | 20 | 0 | 2 | 0 | 0 | 1 | 0 | 0 | 0 | 0 | 5 | 0 | 1 | 0 | 0 | 6 | 0 | 3 | 1 | 0 | 32 | 0 | 6 | 1 | 0 |
| 6 | MF | (Brazil) | Casemiro | 28 | 3 | 13 | 0 | 0 | 1 | 0 | 1 | 0 | 0 | 1 | 0 | 0 | 0 | 0 | 10 | 1 | 2 | 0 | 0 | 40 | 4 | 16 | 0 | 0 |
| 7 | FW | (Portugal) | Ricardo Quaresma | 30 | 6 | 3 | 0 | 0 | 0 | 0 | 0 | 0 | 0 | 3 | 1 | 0 | 0 | 0 | 10 | 3 | 1 | 0 | 0 | 43 | 10 | 4 | 0 | 0 |
| 8 | MF | (Algeria) | Yacine Brahimi | 28 | 7 | 0 | 0 | 0 | 1 | 0 | 0 | 0 | 0 | 2 | 0 | 0 | 0 | 0 | 11 | 6 | 0 | 0 | 0 | 42 | 13 | 0 | 0 | 0 |
| 9 | FW | (Colombia) | Jackson Martínez | 30 | 21 | 3 | 0 | 0 | 1 | 1 | 0 | 0 | 0 | 1 | 2 | 1 | 0 | 0 | 10 | 8 | 1 | 0 | 0 | 42 | 32 | 5 | 0 | 0 |
| 10 | MF | (Colombia) | Juan Quintero | 20 | 2 | 0 | 0 | 0 | 1 | 0 | 0 | 0 | 0 | 4 | 1 | 0 | 0 | 0 | 5 | 0 | 0 | 0 | 0 | 30 | 3 | 0 | 0 | 0 |
| 11 | FW | (Spain) | Cristian Tello | 25 | 7 | 1 | 0 | 0 | 1 | 0 | 0 | 0 | 0 | 3 | 0 | 1 | 0 | 0 | 8 | 1 | 0 | 0 | 0 | 37 | 8 | 2 | 0 | 0 |
| 12 | GK | (Brazil) | Fabiano | 28 | 0 | 2 | 0 | 1 | 0 | 0 | 0 | 0 | 0 | 0 | 0 | 0 | 0 | 0 | 10 | 0 | 0 | 0 | 0 | 38 | 0 | 2 | 0 | 1 |
| 13 | DF | (Mexico) | Diego Reyes | 3 | 0 | 1 | 0 | 0 | 0 | 0 | 0 | 0 | 0 | 4 | 0 | 0 | 1 | 0 | 2 | 0 | 0 | 0 | 0 | 9 | 0 | 1 | 1 | 0 |
| 14 | DF | (Spain) | José Ángel | 7 | 0 | 0 | 0 | 0 | 1 | 0 | 0 | 0 | 0 | 4 | 0 | 1 | 0 | 0 | 0 | 0 | 0 | 0 | 0 | 12 | 0 | 1 | 0 | 0 |
| 15 | MF | (Brazil) | Evandro | 21 | 1 | 1 | 0 | 0 | 0 | 0 | 0 | 0 | 0 | 5 | 4 | 1 | 0 | 1 | 7 | 0 | 0 | 0 | 0 | 33 | 5 | 2 | 0 | 1 |
| 16 | MF | (Mexico) | Héctor Herrera | 33 | 3 | 3 | 0 | 0 | 1 | 0 | 0 | 0 | 0 | 1 | 0 | 0 | 0 | 0 | 11 | 4 | 1 | 0 | 0 | 46 | 7 | 4 | 0 | 0 |
| 17 | FW | (Portugal) | Hernâni | 7 | 2 | 0 | 0 | 0 | 0 | 0 | 0 | 0 | 0 | 1 | 0 | 0 | 0 | 0 | 1 | 0 | 0 | 0 | 0 | 9 | 2 | 0 | 0 | 0 |
| 18 | FW | (Spain) | Adrián | 9 | 0 | 0 | 0 | 0 | 1 | 0 | 0 | 0 | 0 | 3 | 0 | 0 | 0 | 0 | 5 | 1 | 0 | 0 | 0 | 18 | 1 | 0 | 0 | 0 |
| 21 | FW | (Portugal) | Ricardo Pereira | 5 | 0 | 2 | 0 | 0 | 0 | 0 | 0 | 0 | 0 | 5 | 0 | 1 | 0 | 0 | 3 | 0 | 1 | 0 | 0 | 13 | 0 | 4 | 0 | 0 |
| 22 | MF | (Spain) | José Campaña | 2 | 0 | 1 | 0 | 0 | 0 | 0 | 0 | 0 | 0 | 4 | 0 | 1 | 0 | 0 | 0 | 0 | 0 | 0 | 0 | 6 | 0 | 2 | 0 | 0 |
| 24 | GK | (Portugal) | Ricardo | 0 | 0 | 0 | 0 | 0 | 0 | 0 | 0 | 0 | 0 | 0 | 0 | 0 | 0 | 0 | 0 | 0 | 0 | 0 | 0 | 0 | 0 | 0 | 0 | 0 |
| 25 | GK | (Spain) | Andrés Fernández | 1 | 0 | 0 | 0 | 0 | 1 | 0 | 0 | 0 | 0 | 1 | 0 | 0 | 0 | 0 | 1 | 0 | 0 | 0 | 0 | 4 | 0 | 0 | 0 | 0 |
| 26 | DF | (Brazil) | Alex Sandro | 28 | 1 | 8 | 1 | 0 | 0 | 0 | 0 | 0 | 0 | 1 | 0 | 0 | 0 | 0 | 11 | 0 | 3 | 0 | 0 | 40 | 1 | 11 | 1 | 0 |
| 30 | FW | (Spain) | Óliver | 26 | 7 | 3 | 0 | 0 | 1 | 0 | 0 | 0 | 0 | 3 | 0 | 1 | 0 | 0 | 10 | 0 | 2 | 0 | 0 | 40 | 7 | 6 | 0 | 0 |
| 36 | MF | (Portugal) | Rúben Neves | 24 | 1 | 1 | 0 | 0 | 1 | 0 | 0 | 0 | 0 | 3 | 0 | 0 | 0 | 0 | 9 | 0 | 0 | 0 | 0 | 37 | 1 | 1 | 0 | 0 |
| 39 | FW | (Portugal) | Gonçalo Paciência | 1 | 0 | 0 | 0 | 0 | 0 | 0 | 0 | 0 | 0 | 3 | 1 | 0 | 0 | 0 | 0 | 0 | 0 | 0 | 0 | 4 | 1 | 0 | 0 | 0 |
| 80 | FW | (Portugal) | Ivo Rodrigues | 0 | 0 | 0 | 0 | 0 | 0 | 0 | 0 | 0 | 0 | 1 | 0 | 0 | 0 | 0 | 0 | 0 | 0 | 0 | 0 | 1 | 0 | 0 | 0 | 0 |
| 99 | FW | (Cameroon) | Vincent Aboubakar | 13 | 4 | 0 | 0 | 0 | 0 | 0 | 0 | 0 | 0 | 2 | 1 | 0 | 0 | 0 | 4 | 3 | 0 | 0 | 0 | 19 | 8 | 0 | 0 | 0 |
| Total | | | | — | 73 | 58 | 1 | 2 | — | 1 | 2 | 0 | 0 | — | 10 | 12 | 1 | 1 | — | 28 | 20 | 1 | 0 | — | 112 | 92 | 3 | 3 |

=== Goalscorers ===
| Rank | Pos. | Nat. | Player | Primeira Liga | Taça de Portugal | Taça da Liga | Europe | Total |
|---|---|---|---|---|---|---|---|---|
| 1 | FW | (Colombia) | Jackson Martínez | 21 | 1 | 2 | 8 | 32 |
| 2 | MF | (Algeria) | Yacine Brahimi | 7 | 0 | 0 | 6 | 13 |
| 3 | FW | (Portugal) | Ricardo Quaresma | 6 | 0 | 1 | 3 | 10 |
| 4 | FW | (Cameroon) | Vincent Aboubakar | 4 | 0 | 1 | 3 | 8 |
| 4 | FW | (Spain) | Cristian Tello | 7 | 0 | 0 | 1 | 8 |
| 6 | DF | (Brazil) | Danilo | 6 | 0 | 0 | 1 | 7 |
| 6 | MF | (Mexico) | Héctor Herrera | 3 | 0 | 0 | 4 | 7 |
| 6 | FW | (Spain) | Óliver | 7 | 0 | 0 | 0 | 7 |
| 9 | MF | (Brazil) | Evandro | 1 | 0 | 4 | 0 | 5 |
| 10 | MF | (Brazil) | Casemiro | 3 | 0 | 0 | 1 | 4 |
| 11 | MF | (Colombia) | Juan Quintero | 2 | 0 | 1 | 0 | 3 |
| 12 | FW | (Portugal) | Hernâni | 2 | 0 | 0 | 0 | 2 |
| 12 | DF | (Netherlands) | Bruno Martins Indi | 2 | 0 | 0 | 0 | 2 |
| 14 | FW | (Spain) | Adrián | 0 | 0 | 0 | 1 | 1 |
| 14 | MF | (Portugal) | Rúben Neves | 1 | 0 | 0 | 0 | 1 |
| 14 | FW | (Portugal) | Gonçalo Paciência | 0 | 0 | 1 | 0 | 1 |
| 14 | DF | (Brazil) | Alex Sandro | 1 | 0 | 0 | 0 | 1 |
| Total | | | | 73 | 1 | 10 | 28 | 112 |

== Awards ==
| No. | Pos | Name | Award | Ref |
|---|---|---|---|---|
| 8 | MF | (Algeria) Yacine Brahimi | BBC African Footballer of the Year (2014) | |
| 8 | MF | (Algeria) Yacine Brahimi | CAF Most Promising Talent of the Year (2014) | |
| 9 | FW | (Colombia) Jackson Martínez | SJPF Player of the Month (December 2014) | |
| 9 | FW | (Colombia) Jackson Martínez | SJPF Player of the Month (January 2015) | |
| 11 | FW | (Spain) Cristian Tello | SJPF Player of the Month (March 2015) | |

== See also ==
- List of FC Porto seasons
