= 2018–19 FC Porto season =

Porto
2018–19 season
- President: Jorge Nuno Pinto da Costa
- Head coach: Sérgio Conceição
- Stadium: Estádio do Dragão
- Primeira Liga: 2nd
- Taça de Portugal: Runners-up
- Taça da Liga: Runners-up
- Supertaça Cândido de Oliveira: Winners
- UEFA Champions League: Quarter-finals
- Top goalscorer: League: Francisco Soares (15 goals); All: Francisco Soares (22 goals)
- Highest home attendance: 49,220; Porto 1–2 Benfica (2 March 2019)
- Lowest home attendance: 15,945; Porto 4–3 Moreirense (18 December 2018)
- Average home league attendance: 41,626
Home colours	Away colours	Third colours
- All statistics correct as of 25 May 2019.

The 2018–19 season was Futebol Clube do Porto's 109th competitive season and 85th consecutive season in the top flight of Portuguese football. It began on 4 August 2018 and concluded on 25 May 2019.

Porto started the season with a 3–1 victory in the Supertaça Cândido de Oliveira against the 2017–18 Taça de Portugal holders, Desportivo das Aves, which secured the club's 21st Supertaça win and first since 2013. Porto led the 2018–19 Primeira Liga for more than half of the season, but lost it to Benfica on 2 March 2019, after a 1–2 home defeat. Porto finished the league as runners-up with 85 points, two points behind Benfica. Porto reached the finals of the 2018–19 Taça da Liga and the 2018–19 Taça de Portugal, but were defeated on both occasions by Sporting CP after a penalty shootout, for the second consecutive season.

In UEFA competitions, Porto participated for the 8th consecutive and 23rd overall time in the UEFA Champions League group stage, a record shared with Barcelona and Real Madrid. They advanced to the round of 16 as group winners, where they beat Italian side Roma to qualify for the quarter-finals for the first time since 2015. For the second consecutive season, they were eliminated from the competition after losing to English side Liverpool.

== Players ==
=== Squad information ===
N	Pos.	Nat.	Name	Age	EU	Since	App	Goals	Ends	Transfer fee	Notes
1	GK	(Spain)	Iker Casillas	37	EU	2015	156	0	2020	Free	
2	DF	(Uruguay)	Maxi Pereira	34	Non-EU	2015	126	5	2019	Free	
3	DF	(Brazil)	Éder Militão	20	Non-EU	2018	47	5	2023	€7M	
4	DF	(Portugal)	Diogo Leite	19	EU	2018	6	1	2023	Youth system	
6	MF	(Portugal)	Bruno Costa	21	EU	2018	7	0	2022	Youth system	
7	FW	(Portugal)	Hernâni	26	EU	2015	50	7	2019	€2.9M	
8	FW	(Algeria)	Yacine Brahimi	28	Non-EU	2014	215	54	2019	€6.5M	Second nationality: France
9	FW	(Cameroon)	Vincent Aboubakar	26	Non-EU	2014	111	56	2021	€11.2M	
10	MF	(Spain)	Óliver Torres	23	EU	2014	139	12	2021	€20M	
11	FW	(Mali)	Moussa Marega	27	Non-EU	2016	101	44	2021	€3.8M	
12	DF	(Portugal)	Wilson Manafá	24	EU	2019	17	1	2023	Undisclosed	
13	DF	(Brazil)	Alex Telles	25	Non-EU	2016	143	9	2021	€6.5M	Second nationality: Italy
14	FW	(Chad)	Marius Mouandilmadji	20	EU	2018	2	1	2022	Undisclosed	
15	MF	(Senegal)	Mamadou Loum	21	Non-EU	2019	3	0	2019	Undisclosed	
16	MF	(Mexico)	Héctor Herrera	28	Non-EU	2013	244	36	2019	€11M	
17	FW	(Mexico)	Jesús Corona	25	Non-EU	2015	170	24	2022	€10.5M	
19	DF	(Democratic Republic of the Congo)	Chancel Mbemba	23	Non-EU	2018	6	0	2022	€4.5M	
20	FW	(Spain)	Adrián López	30	EU	2014	43	7	2019	€11M	
21	FW	(Portugal)	André Pereira	23	EU	2017	23	3	2021	Undisclosed	
22	MF	(Portugal)	Danilo Pereira	26	EU	2015	158	17	2022	€4.5M	
23	DF	(Brazil)	João Pedro	21	Non-EU	2018	3	0	2023	€4M	
25	MF	(Brazil)	Otávio	23	Non-EU	2014	93	11	2021	€2.5M	
26	GK	(Brazil)	Vaná	27	Non-EU	2017	10	0	2021	€1M	
28	DF	(Brazil)	Felipe	29	Non-EU	2016	142	11	2021	€6.2M	
29	FW	(Brazil)	Soares	27	Non-EU	2017	84	45	2021	€5.6M	
31	GK	(Portugal)	Diogo Costa	18	EU	2018	0	0	2022	Youth system	
33	DF	(Portugal)	Pepe	35	EU	2019	21	2	2021	Free	
37	FW	(Brazil)	Fernando	25	Non-EU	2019	21	2	2023	€1.5M	
40	GK	(Brazil)	Fabiano	30	Non-EU	2013	74	0	2019	€1.2M	

- Last updated: 25 May 2019
- Source: FC Porto
- Ordered by squad number.

=== Transfers and loans ===
==== In ====
Date	Pos.	Name	Nationality	Age	Transferred from	Window	Until	Fee	Ref.
2 June 2018	DF	Yordan Osorio	Venezuela	24	Tondela (Portugal)	Summer	2022	€2M	
7 June 2018	DF	João Pedro	Brazil	21	Palmeiras (Brazil)	Summer	2023	€4M	
8 June 2018	MF	Paulinho	Brazil	23	Portimonense (Portugal)	Summer	2022	Undisclosed	
26 June 2018	FW	Majeed Waris	Ghana	26	Lorient (France)	Summer	2022	€5.2M	
27 June 2018	DF	Saidy Janko	Switzerland	22	Saint-Étienne (France)	Summer	2022	€3M	
2 July 2018	MF	Ewerton	Brazil	25	Portimonense (Portugal)	Summer	2022	Undisclosed	
17 July 2018	FW	Marius Mouandilmadji	Chad	20	Coton Sport (Cameroon)	Summer	2022	Undisclosed	
23 July 2018	DF	Chancel Mbemba	(Democratic Republic of the Congo) DR Congo	23	Newcastle United (England)	Summer	2022	€4.5M	
7 August 2018	DF	Éder Militão	Brazil	20	São Paulo (Brazil)	Summer	2023	€7M	
4 January 2019	FW	Fernando	Brazil	25	Santa Clara (Portugal)	Winter	2023	€1.5M	
8 January 2019	DF	Pepe	Portugal	35	Unattached	Winter	2021	Free	
21 January 2019	DF	Wilson Manafá	Portugal	24	Portimonense (Portugal)	Winter	2023	Undisclosed	

Total expending: ▼€27.2 million

==== Out ====
Date	Pos.	Name	Nationality	Age	Transferred to	Window	Fee	Ref.
14 May 2018	FW	Ivo Rodrigues	Portugal	23	Royal Antwerp (Belgium)	Summer	Undisclosed	
19 May 2018	DF	Ricardo Pereira	Portugal	24	Leicester City (England)	Summer	€22M	
31 May 2018	DF	Iván Marcano	Spain	30	Roma (Italy)	Summer	Free	
1 June 2018	DF	Willy Boly	France	27	Wolverhampton Wanderers (England)	Summer	€12M	
1 June 2018	FW	Suk Hyun-jun	South Korea	26	Troyes (France)	Summer	€2M	
6 June 2018	DF	Diogo Dalot	Portugal	19	Manchester United (England)	Summer	€22M	
1 July 2018	DF	Diego Reyes	Mexico	25	Unattached	Summer	Free	
4 July 2018	MF	André André	Portugal	28	Vitória de Guimarães (Portugal)	Summer	Free	
5 July 2018	FW	Zé Manuel	Portugal	27	Santa Clara (Portugal)	Summer	Undisclosed	
11 July 2018	DF	Miguel Layún	Mexico	30	Villarreal (Spain)	Summer	€4M	
12 July 2018	FW	Gonçalo Paciência	Portugal	23	Eintracht Frankfurt (Germany)	Summer	€3M	
26 July 2018	MF	João Carlos Teixeira	Portugal	25	Vitória de Guimarães (Portugal)	Summer	Free	
21 August 2018	MF	Paulinho	Brazil	24	Portimonense (Portugal)	Summer	Undisclosed	

Total income: ▲€65 million

==== Loan in ====
Date	Pos.	Name	Nationality	Age	Loaned from	Window	Until	Ref.
30 August 2018	DF	Jorge	Brazil	22	Monaco (France)	Summer	30 June 2019	
31 August 2018	MF	Riechedly Bazoer	Netherlands	21	Vfl Wolfsburg (Germany)	Summer	30 June 2019	
31 January 2019	MF	Mamadou Loum	Senegal	22	Braga (Portugal)	Winter	30 June 2019	

==== Loan return ====
Date	Pos.	Name	Nationality	Age	Returned from	Window
1 July 2018	GK	João Costa	Portugal	22	Gil Vicente (Portugal)	Summer
1 July 2018	DF	Chidozie Awaziem	Nigeria	21	Nantes (France)	Summer
1 July 2018	DF	Miguel Layún	Mexico	30	Sevilla (Spain)	Summer
1 July 2018	MF	Alberto Bueno	Spain	30	Málaga (Spain)	Summer
1 July 2018	MF	João Carlos Teixeira	Portugal	25	Braga (Portugal)	Summer
1 July 2018	MF	Mikel Agu	Nigeria	25	Bursaspor (Turkey)	Summer
1 July 2018	FW	Adrián López	Spain	30	Deportivo La Coruña (Spain)	Summer
1 July 2018	FW	Rui Pedro	Portugal	20	Boavista (Portugal)	Summer
31 January 2019	FW	Kelvin	Brazil	25	Vasco da Gama (Brazil)	Winter

==== Loan out ====
Date	Pos.	Name	Nationality	Age	Loaned to	Window	Until	Ref.
28 June 2018	DF	Jorge Fernandes	Portugal	21	Tondela (Portugal)	Summer	30 June 2019	
5 July 2018	DF	Yordan Osorio	Venezuela	24	Vitória de Guimarães (Portugal)	Summer	30 June 2019	
10 July 2018	FW	Galeno	Brazil	20	Rio Ave (Portugal)	Summer	30 June 2019	
24 July 2018	MF	Ewerton	Brazil	25	Portimonense (Portugal)	Summer	30 June 2019	
4 August 2018	GK	João Costa	Portugal	22	Cartagena (Spain)	Summer	30 June 2019	
7 August 2018	FW	Majeed Waris	Ghana	26	Nantes (France)	Summer	30 June 2019	
31 August 2018	GK	José Sá	Portugal	25	Olympiacos (Greece)	Summer	30 June 2019	
31 August 2018	DF	Saidy Janko	Switzerland	22	Nottingham Forest (England)	Summer	30 June 2019	
31 August 2018	MF	Mikel Agu	Nigeria	25	Vitória de Setúbal (Portugal)	Summer	30 June 2019	
21 January 2019	DF	Chidozie Awaziem	Nigeria	22	Çaykur Rizespor (Turkey)	Winter	30 June 2019	
31 January 2019	MF	Sérgio Oliveira	Portugal	26	PAOK (Greece)	Winter	30 June 2019	

== Technical staff ==
Position	Staff
Head coach	(Portugal) Sérgio Conceição
Assistant coaches	(France) Siramana Dembélé
Assistant coaches	(Portugal) Vítor Bruno
Fitness coaches	(Portugal) Manuel Vítor
Fitness coaches	(Portugal) Telmo Sousa
Fitness coaches	(Portugal) Eduardo Oliveira
Goalkeeping coach	(Portugal) Diamantino Figueiredo

Last updated: 5 April 2019
Source: FC Porto, O Jogo (in Portuguese)

== Pre-season and friendlies ==
Win Draw Loss

7 July 2018 Friendly	Porto	4–0	Espinho	Olival, Portugal
10:30 WEST	A. Pereira; Adrián; Adrián; Hernâni			Stadium: CTFD PortoGaia

11 July 2018 Friendly	Porto	8–0	Varzim	Olival, Portugal
10:00 WEST	A. Pereira; A. Pereira; Otávio; Soares; Soares; Hernâni; Brahimi; Ewerton			Stadium: CTFD PortoGaia

14 July 2018 Friendly	Porto	3–0	Académica	Olival, Portugal
	A. Pereira; B. Costa; Adrián			Stadium: CTFD PortoGaia

17 July 2018 Friendly	Portimonense	2–1	Porto	Portimão, Portugal
20:30 WEST	Pires 42'; Bruno Tabata 44'		A. Pereira 82'	Stadium: Estádio Municipal de Portimão

20 July 2018 Algarve Football Cup	Porto	1–2 (3–4 p)	Lille	Algarve, Portugal
20:00 WEST	Hernâni 72'		Xeka 64'; Mothiba 87'	Stadium: Estádio Algarve
	Penalties
	Felipe (penalty scored); Soares (penalty missed); Otávio (penalty scored); Leite (penalty missed); Hernâni (penalty scored)		Ikoné (penalty scored); Mothiba (penalty missed); Droehnle (penalty scored); Mendes (penalty scored); El Ghazi (penalty scored)

22 July 2018 Algarve Football Cup	Porto	1–0	Everton	Algarve, Portugal
20:00 WEST	Marega 51'			Stadium: Estádio Algarve

25 July 2018 Friendly	Porto	2–0	Farense	Lagos, Portugal
11:00 WEST	Corona 8'; Hernâni 14'			Stadium: Municipal de Lagos

28 July 2018 Presentation	Porto	0–0	Newcastle United	Porto, Portugal
20:00 WEST				Stadium: Estádio do Dragão; Attendance: 43,829

== Competitions ==
=== Overall record ===
Competition	First match	Last match	Starting round	Final position	Record							
Competition	First match	Last match	Starting round	Final position	Pld	W	D	L	GF	GA	GD	Win %
Primeira Liga	11 August 2018	18 May 2019	Matchday 1	2nd	34	27	4	3	74	20	+54	79.41
Taça de Portugal	19 October 2018	25 May 2019	3rd round	Runners-up	7	5	2	0	20	7	+13	71.43
Taça da Liga	14 September 2018	26 January 2019	Group stage	Runners-up	5	3	2	0	11	6	+5	60.00
Supertaça Cândido de Oliveira	4 August 2018		Final	Winners	1	1	0	0	3	1	+2	100.00
UEFA Champions League	18 September 2018	17 April 2019	Group stage	Quarter-finals	10	6	1	3	20	15	+5	60.00
Total					57	42	9	6	128	49	+79	73.68

Last updated: 25 May 2019
Source: Competitions

=== Supertaça Cândido de Oliveira ===
4 August 2018	Porto	3–1	Aves	Aveiro
20:45 WEST	Brahimi 25'; M. Pereira 67'; Corona 84'		Falcão 14'	Stadium: Estádio Municipal de Aveiro; Attendance: 28,560; Referee: Luís Godinho (Évora); Man of the Match: M. Pereira

=== Primeira Liga ===
==== League table ====
Pos	Team	Pld	W	D	L	GF	GA	GD	Pts	Qualification or relegation
1	Benfica (C)	34	28	3	3	103	31	+72	87	Qualification for the Champions League group stage
2	Porto	34	27	4	3	74	20	+54	85	Qualification for the Champions League third qualifying round
3	Sporting CP	34	23	5	6	72	33	+39	74	Qualification for the Europa League group stage (Note: Since the winners of the 2018–19 Taça de Portugal, Sporting CP, qualified for European competition based on league position, the spot awarded to the third-placed team (Europa League third qualifying round) was passed to the fourth-placed team, and the spot awarded to the fourth-placed team (Europa League second qualifying round) was passed to the fifth-placed team.)
4	Braga	34	21	4	9	56	37	+19	67	Qualification for the Europa League third qualifying round
5	Vitória de Guimarães	34	15	7	12	46	34	+12	52 (Note: Vitória de Guimarães finished ahead of Moreirense on head-to-head points: Vitória de Guimarães 1–0 Moreirense, Moreirense 1–3 Vitória de Guimarães.)	Qualification for the Europa League second qualifying round

Source: Liga Portugal
Rules for classification: 1) Points; 2) Head-to-head points; 3) Head-to-head goal difference; 4) Head-to-head away goals scored; 5) Goal difference; 6) Matches won; 7) Goals scored; 8) Play-off.
(C) Champions

==== Results by round ====
Round	1	2	3	4	5	6	7	8	9	10	11	12	13	14	15	16	17	18	19	20	21	22	23	24	25	26	27	28	29	30	31	32	33	34
Ground	H	A	H	H	A	H	A	H	A	H	A	H	A	H	A	H	A	A	H	A	A	H	A	H	A	H	A	H	A	H	A	H	A	H
Result	W	W	L	W	W	W	L	W	W	W	W	W	W	W	W	W	D	W	W	D	D	W	W	L	W	W	W	W	W	W	D	W	W	W
Position	1	1	5	4	3	2	3	1	1	1	1	1	1	1	1	1	1	1	1	1	1	1	1	2	2	2	2	2	2	2	2	2	2	2

Updated to match(es) played on 18 May 2019. Source: Liga Portugal
A = Away; H = Home; W = Win; D = Draw; L = Loss

==== Matches ====
11 August 2018 1	Porto	5–0	Chaves	Porto
21:00 WEST	Aboubakar 14', 20'; Brahimi 45'; Corona 71'; Marius 88'			Stadium: Estádio do Dragão; Attendance: 46,509; Referee: Nuno Almeida; Man of the Match: Aboubakar

19 August 2018 2	Belenenses	2–3	Porto	Oeiras
18:30 WEST	Fredy 55' (pen.); Keita 83'		Leite 26'; Otávio 46'; Telles 90+6' (pen.)	Stadium: Estádio Nacional; Attendance: 10,901; Referee: Carlos Xistra

25 August 2018 3	Porto	2–3	Vitória de Guimarães	Porto
21:00 WEST	Brahimi 37'; A. Pereira 43'		André 63' (pen.); Tozé 76'; Davidson 87'	Stadium: Estádio do Dragão; Attendance: 47,008; Referee: Fábio Veríssimo; Man of the Match: Douglas

2 September 2018 4	Porto	3–0	Moreirense	Porto
20:30 WEST	Herrera 15'; Aboubakar 28'; Marega 90+4'			Stadium: Estádio do Dragão; Attendance: 43,316; Referee: Hélder Malheiro; Man of the Match: Herrera

22 September 2018 5	Vitória de Setúbal	0–2	Porto	Setúbal
21:00 WEST			Aboubakar 17'; Oliveira 78'	Stadium: Estádio do Bonfim; Attendance: 10,628; Referee: Manuel Oliveira

28 September 2018 6	Porto	1–0	Tondela	Porto
20:30 WEST	Soares 85'			Stadium: Estádio do Dragão; Attendance: 40,011; Referee: Luís Godinho (Évora); Man of the Match: Soares

7 October 2018 7	Benfica	1–0	Porto	Lisbon
17:30 WEST	Seferovic 62'			Stadium: Estádio da Luz; Attendance: 61,567; Referee: Fábio Veríssimo

28 October 2018 8	Porto	2–0	Feirense	Porto
17:30 WET	Felipe 22'; Marega 80'			Stadium: Estádio do Dragão; Attendance: 46,028; Referee: Rui Oliveira; Man of the Match: Óliver

3 November 2018 9	Marítimo	0–2	Porto	Funchal
18:00 WET			Otávio 70'; Marega 73'	Stadium: Estádio dos Barreiros; Attendance: 9,620; Referee: Carlos Xistra

10 November 2018 10	Porto	1–0	Braga	Porto
20:30 WET	Soares 88'			Stadium: Estádio do Dragão; Attendance: 47,929; Referee: Artur Soares Dias; Man of the Match: Soares

2 December 2018 11	Boavista	0–1	Porto	Porto
20:00 WEST			Hernâni 90+5'	Stadium: Estádio do Bessa; Attendance: 13,556; Referee: Hugo Miguel

7 December 2018 12	Porto	4–1	Portimonense	Porto
20:30 WEST	Marega 23', 64'; Soares 57'; Brahimi 59'		Tormena 9'	Stadium: Estádio do Dragão; Attendance: 33,511; Referee: Manuel Mota

15 December 2018 13	Santa Clara	1–2	Porto	Ponta Delgada
20:30 WEST	Zé Manuel 38'		Soares 45+1'; Marega 56'	Stadium: Estádio de São Miguel; Attendance: 8,315; Referee: Luís Godinho (Évora)

23 December 2018 14	Porto	2–1	Rio Ave	Porto
15:00 WEST	Brahimi 16'; Marega 26'		Carlos Vinícius 12'	Stadium: Estádio do Dragão; Attendance: 48,208; Referee: Tiago Martins

3 January 2019 15	Desportivo das Aves	0–1	Porto	Vila das Aves
20:15 WEST			Militão 25'	Stadium: Estádio do CD Aves; Attendance: 5,338; Referee: João Pinheiro

7 January 2019 16	Porto	3–1	Nacional	Porto
21:15 WEST	Brahimi 32', 57'; Soares 38'		Róchez 40'	Stadium: Estádio do Dragão; Attendance: 33,708; Referee: Rui Costa

12 January 2019 17	Sporting CP	0–0	Porto	Lisbon
15:30 WEST				Stadium: Estádio José Alvalade; Attendance: 45,174; Referee: Hugo Miguel

18 January 2019 18	Chaves	1–4	Porto	Chaves
19:00 WEST	Gallo 76' (pen.)		Soares 24', 42', 68'; Coelho 87' (o.g.)	Stadium: Estádio Municipal Eng. Manuel Branco Teixeira; Attendance: 5,950; Referee: Nuno Almeida

30 January 2019 19	Porto	3–0	Belenenses	Porto
21:15 WEST	Brahimi 5'; Militão 29'; Soares 71'			Stadium: Estádio do Dragão; Attendance: 21,808; Referee: Luís Godinho (Évora)

3 February 2019 20	Vitória de Guimarães	0–0	Porto	Guimarães
20:00 WEST				Stadium: Estádio D. Afonso Henriques; Attendance: 25,110; Referee: Rui Costa

8 February 2019 21	Moreirense	1–1	Porto	Moreira de Cónegos
20:30 WEST	Texeira 79'		Herrera 90+2'	Stadium: Parque de Jogos Comendador Joaquim de Almeida Freitas; Attendance: 3,941; Referee: Jorge Sousa

16 February 2019 22	Porto	2–0	Vitória de Setúbal	Porto
20:30 WEST	Herrera 15'; Soares 65'			Stadium: Estádio do Dragão; Attendance: 41,116; Referee: Nuno Almeida

22 February 2019 23	Tondela	0–3	Porto	Tondela
21:15 WEST			Pepe 11'; Óliver 52'; Herrera 74'	Stadium: Estádio João Cardoso; Attendance: 3,963; Referee: Luís Godinho (Évora)

2 March 2019 24	Porto	1–2	Benfica	Porto
20:30 WEST	Adrián 18'		Félix 26'; Silva 52'	Stadium: Estádio do Dragão; Attendance: 49,220; Referee: Jorge Sousa

10 March 2019 25	Feirense	1–2	Porto	Santa Maria da Feira
20:00 WEST	Felipe 4' (o.g.)		D. Pereira 18'; Pepe 35'	Stadium: Estádio Marcolino de Castro; Attendance: 5,414; Referee: Artur Soares Dias

16 March 2019 26	Porto	3–0	Marítimo	Porto
20:30 WEST	Telles 57' (pen.); Militão 72'; Brahimi 88'			Stadium: Estádio do Dragão; Attendance: 46,413; Referee: João Capela

30 March 2019 27	Braga	2–3	Porto	Braga
15:30 WEST	Eduardo 4'; Murilo 47'		Soares 26', 79' (pen.); Telles 69' (pen.)	Stadium: Estádio Municipal de Braga; Attendance: 20,106; Referee: Jorge Sousa

5 April 2019 28	Porto	2–0	Boavista	Porto
20:30 WEST	Soares 41' (pen.); Otávio 48'			Stadium: Estádio do Dragão; Attendance: 39,129; Referee: Rui Costa

13 April 2019 29	Portimonense	0–3	Porto	Portimão
18:00 WEST			Brahimi 14'; Marega 73'; Herrera 90+3'	Stadium: Estádio Municipal de Portimão; Attendance: 5,989; Referee: Fábio Veríssimo

20 April 2019 30	Porto	1–0	Santa Clara	Porto
20:30 WEST	Marega 18'			Stadium: Estádio do Dragão; Attendance: 43,911; Referee: Manuel Oliveira

26 April 2019 31	Rio Ave	2–2	Porto	Vila do Conde
20:30 WEST	Santos 85'; Ronan 90'		Brahimi 18'; Marega 22'	Stadium: Estádio dos Arcos; Attendance: 7,532; Referee: Artur Soares Dias

4 May 2019 32	Porto	4–0	Desportivo das Aves	Porto
20:30 WEST	Corona 18'; Soares 30' (pen.), 70'; Manafá 68'			Stadium: Estádio do Dragão; Attendance: 40,017; Referee: Hugo Miguel

12 May 2019 33	Nacional	0–4	Porto	Funchal
17:30 WEST			Telles 14'; Óliver 28'; Corona 59'; Marega 88' (pen.)	Stadium: Estádio da Madeira; Attendance: 4,098; Referee: Carlos Xistra

18 May 2019 34	Porto	2–1	Sporting CP	Porto
18:30 WEST	D. Pereira 78'; Herrera 87'		Luiz Phellype 61'	Stadium: Estádio do Dragão; Attendance: 39,808; Referee: Fábio Veríssimo

=== Taça de Portugal ===
==== Third round ====
19 October 2018	Vila Real (D)	0–6	(I) Porto	Vila Real
20:15 WEST			Adrián 7', 14', 45+2', 66'; Soares 49'; A. Pereira 61'	Stadium: Complexo Desportivo do Monte da Forca; Referee: António Nobre

==== Fourth round ====
24 November 2018	Porto (I)	2–0	(I) Belenenses	Porto
20:45 WEST	Soares 13'; Otávio 58'			Stadium: Estádio do Dragão; Attendance: 17,717; Referee: Nuno Almeida; Man of the Match: Corona

==== Fifth round ====
18 December 2018	Porto (I)	4–3	(I) Moreirense	Porto
20:45 WEST	Felipe 13'; Hernâni 16'; Marega 65', 89'		Texeira 8'; Santos 45+1'; Tavares 90+2'	Stadium: Estádio do Dragão; Attendance: 15,945; Referee: Carlos Xistra

==== Quarter-finals ====
15 January 2019	Leixões (II)	1–2 (a.e.t.)	(I) Porto	Matosinhos
19:30 WEST	Zé Paulo 78'		Herrera 11'; Hernâni 118'	Stadium: Estádio do Mar; Attendance: 6,100; Referee: João Capela

==== Semi-finals ====
26 February 2019 First leg	Porto (I)	3–0	(I) Braga	Porto
20:15 WEST	Telles 37' (pen.); Soares 63'; Brahimi 90+4'			Stadium: Estádio do Dragão; Attendance: 33,705; Referee: João Pinheiro

2 April 2019 Second leg	Braga (I)	1–1 (1–4 agg.)	(I) Porto	Braga
20:15 WEST	Paulinho 41'		D. Pereira 74'	Stadium: Estádio Municipal de Braga; Attendance: 7,673; Referee: Manuel Mota

==== Final ====
25 May 2019	Sporting CP	2–2 (5–4 p)	Porto	Oeiras
17:15 WEST	D. Pereira 45' (o.g.); Dost 101'		Soares 40'; Felipe 120+1'	Stadium: Estádio Nacional; Attendance: 38,000; Referee: Jorge Sousa
	Penalties
	Dost (penalty missed); Fernandes (penalty scored); Mathieu (penalty scored); Raphinha (penalty scored); Coates (penalty scored); Luiz Phellype (penalty scored)		(penalty scored) Soares; (penalty scored) D. Pereira; (penalty missed) Pepe; (penalty scored) Adrián; (penalty scored) Hernâni; (penalty missed) Fernando

=== Taça da Liga ===
==== Third round ====
Pos	Team	Pld	W	D	L	GF	GA	GD	Pts	Qualification	POR	CHA	VAR	BEL
1	Porto	3	2	1	0	7	4	+3	7	Advanced to knockout phase	—	1–1	4–2	—
2	Chaves	3	2	1	0	5	2	+3	7		—	—	3–1	—
3	Varzim	3	1	0	2	5	8	−3	3		—	—	—	2–1
4	Belenenses SAD	3	0	0	3	2	5	−3	0		1–2	0–1	—	—

Source: Liga Portugal
Rules for classification: Tiebreakers

14 September 2018 1	Porto	1–1	Chaves	Porto
20:30 WEST	Hernâni 74'		Eustáquio 83'	Stadium: Estádio do Dragão; Attendance: 37,708; Referee: Vítor Ferreira

31 October 2018 2	Porto	4–2	Varzim	Porto
19:00 WEST	Bazoer 42'; Soares 73'; Payne 81' (o.g.); A. Pereira 86'		Jonathan 30'; Haman 75'	Stadium: Estádio do Dragão; Attendance: 17,824; Referee: João Capela

30 December 2018 3	Belenenses	1–2	Porto	Oeiras
17:00 WEST	Reinildo 4'		Marega 53'; Soares 63'	Stadium: Estádio Nacional; Attendance: 6,319; Referee: Manuel Oliveira

==== Semi-finals ====
22 January 2019	Benfica	1–3	Porto	Braga
19:45 WEST	Silva 31'		Brahimi 24'; Marega 35'; Fernando 86'	Stadium: Estádio Municipal de Braga; Attendance: 22,945; Referee: Carlos Xistra

==== Final ====
26 January 2019	Porto	1–1 (1–3 p)	Sporting CP	Braga
19:45 WEST	Fernando 79'		Dost 90+2'	Stadium: Estádio Municipal de Braga; Attendance: 25,213; Referee: João Pinheiro
	Penalties
	Telles (penalty scored); Militão (penalty missed); Hernâni (penalty missed); Felipe (penalty missed)		(penalty scored) Dost; (penalty missed) Coates; (penalty scored) Fernandes; (penalty scored) Nani

=== UEFA Champions League ===
==== Group stage ====
Pos	Team	Pld	W	D	L	GF	GA	GD	Pts	Qualification
1	(Portugal) Porto	6	5	1	0	15	6	+9	16	Advance to knockout phase
2	(Germany) Schalke 04	6	3	2	1	6	4	+2	11	Advance to knockout phase
3	(Turkey) Galatasaray	6	1	1	4	5	8	−3	4	Transfer to Europa League
4	(Russia) Lokomotiv Moscow	6	1	0	5	4	12	−8	3	

Source: UEFA
Rules for classification: Group stage tiebreakers

18 September 2018 1	Schalke 04 (Germany)	1–1	(Portugal) Porto	Gelsenkirchen, Germany
20:00 WEST	Embolo 64'		Otávio 75' (pen.)	Stadium: Veltins-Arena; Attendance: 45,755; Referee: Jesús Gil Manzano (Spain)

3 October 2018 2	Porto (Portugal)	1–0	(Turkey) Galatasaray	Porto, Portugal
20:00 WEST	Marega 49'			Stadium: Estádio do Dragão; Attendance: 42,711; Referee: Michael Oliver (England); Man of the Match: Casillas

24 October 2018 3	Lokomotiv Moscow (Russia)	1–3	(Portugal) Porto	Moscow, Russia
20:00 WEST	Miranchuk 38'		Marega 26' (pen.); Herrera 35'; Corona 47'	Stadium: RZD Arena; Attendance: 16,034; Referee: Bobby Madden (Scotland)

6 November 2018 4	Porto (Portugal)	4–1	(Russia) Lokomotiv Moscow	Porto, Portugal
20:00 WEST	Herrera 2'; Marega 42'; Corona 67'; Otávio 90+3'		Farfán 59'	Stadium: Estádio do Dragão; Attendance: 34,616; Referee: Davide Massa (Italy)

28 November 2018 5	Porto (Portugal)	3–1	(Germany) Schalke 04	Porto, Portugal
20:00 WEST	Militão 52'; Corona 55'; Marega 90+4'		Bentaleb 89' (pen.)	Stadium: Estádio do Dragão; Attendance: 41,603; Referee: Ovidiu Hațegan (Romania)

11 December 2018 6	Galatasaray (Turkey)	2–3	(Portugal) Porto	Istanbul, Turkey
17:55 WEST	Feghouli 45+1' (pen.); Derdiyok 65'		Felipe 17'; Marega 42' (pen.); Oliveira 57'	Stadium: Türk Telekom Stadium; Attendance: 33,972; Referee: Aleksei Kulbakov (Belarus)

==== Knockout phase ====
===== Round of 16 =====
12 February 2019 First leg	Roma (Italy)	2–1	(Portugal) Porto	Rome, Italy
20:00 WEST	Zaniolo 70', 76'		Adrián 79'	Stadium: Stadio Olimpico; Attendance: 51,727; Referee: Danny Makkelie (Netherlands)

6 March 2019 Second leg	Porto (Portugal)	3–1 (a.e.t.) (4–3 agg.)	(Italy) Roma	Porto, Portugal
20:00 WEST	Soares 26'; Marega 52'; Telles 117' (pen.)		De Rossi 37' (pen.)	Stadium: Estádio do Dragão; Attendance: 49,029; Referee: Cüneyt Çakır (Turkey)

===== Quarter-finals =====
9 April 2019 First leg	Liverpool (England)	2–0	(Portugal) Porto	Liverpool, England
20:00 GMT	Keïta 5'; Firmino 26'			Stadium: Anfield; Attendance: 52,465; Referee: Antonio Mateu Lahoz (Spain)

17 April 2019 Second leg	Porto (Portugal)	1–4 (1–6 agg.)	(England) Liverpool	Porto, Portugal
20:00 GMT	Militão 68'		Mané 26'; Salah 65'; Firmino 77'; Van Dijk 84'	Stadium: Estádio do Dragão; Attendance: 49,117; Referee: Danny Makkelie (Netherlands)

== Statistics ==
As of 25 May 2019

=== Appearances and discipline ===
Numbers in parentheses denote appearances as substitute.

No.	Pos.	Player	Supertaça				Primeira Liga				Taça de Portugal				Taça da Liga				Champions League				Total			
No.	Pos.	Player	Apps	Yellow card	Second yellow card	Red card	Apps	Yellow card	Second yellow card	Red card	Apps	Yellow card	Second yellow card	Red card	Apps	Yellow card	Second yellow card	Red card	Apps	Yellow card	Second yellow card	Red card	Apps	Yellow card	Second yellow card	Red card
1	GK	(Spain) Iker Casillas	1 (0)	0	0	0	31 (0)	4	0	0	0 (0)	0	0	0	0 (0)	0	0	0	10 (0)	0	0	0	42 (0)	4	0	0
2	DF	(Uruguay) Maxi Pereira	1 (0)	0	0	0	14 (4)	2	0	0	2 (0)	0	0	0	1 (0)	0	0	0	7 (1)	0	0	0	25 (5)	2	0	0
3	DF	(Brazil) Éder Militão	0 (0)	0	0	0	29 (0)	0	0	0	5 (1)	0	0	0	3 (0)	0	0	0	9 (0)	2	0	0	45 (1)	2	0	0
4	DF	(Portugal) Diogo Leite	1 (0)	0	0	0	3 (0)	2	0	0	0 (0)	0	0	0	1 (0)	1	0	0	1 (0)	0	0	0	6 (0)	3	0	0
6	MF	(Portugal) Bruno Costa	0 (0)	0	0	0	0 (2)	0	0	0	0 (0)	0	0	0	1 (1)	0	0	0	0 (2)	0	0	0	1 (5)	0	0	0
7	FW	(Portugal) Hernâni	0 (0)	0	0	0	0 (10)	1	0	0	0 (3)	1	0	0	1 (3)	1	0	0	1 (5)	0	0	0	2 (21)	3	0	0
8	FW	(Algeria) Yacine Brahimi	1 (0)	0	0	0	27 (5)	2	0	0	1 (2)	0	0	0	3 (1)	0	0	0	7 (2)	0	0	0	39 (10)	2	0	0
9	FW	(Cameroon) Vincent Aboubakar	1 (0)	0	0	0	6 (2)	1	0	0	0 (0)	0	0	0	0 (1)	1	0	0	1 (0)	0	0	0	8 (3)	2	0	0
10	MF	(Spain) Óliver Torres	0 (1)	0	0	0	13 (12)	2	0	0	5 (0)	1	0	0	2 (1)	1	0	0	4 (1)	1	0	0	24 (15)	5	0	0
11	FW	(Mali) Moussa Marega	0 (0)	0	0	0	28 (1)	5	0	0	2 (3)	1	0	0	4 (0)	3	0	0	9 (0)	1	0	0	43 (4)	10	0	0
12	DF	(Portugal) Wilson Manafá	0 (0)	0	0	0	8 (6)	1	0	0	2 (1)	1	0	0	0 (0)	0	0	0	0 (0)	0	0	0	10 (7)	2	0	0
13	DF	(Brazil) Alex Telles	1 (0)	0	0	0	33 (0)	4	0	0	5 (0)	1	0	0	4 (0)	1	0	0	10 (0)	1	0	0	53 (0)	7	0	0
14	FW	(Chad) Marius Mouandilmadji	0 (0)	0	0	0	0 (1)	0	0	0	0 (1)	0	0	0	0 (0)	0	0	0	0 (0)	0	0	0	0 (2)	0	0	0
15	MF	(Senegal) Mamadou Loum	0 (0)	0	0	0	0 (2)	0	0	0	0 (1)	0	0	0	0 (0)	0	0	0	0 (0)	0	0	0	0 (3)	0	0	0
16	MF	(Mexico) Héctor Herrera	1 (0)	0	0	0	29 (4)	5	0	0	6 (0)	0	0	0	4 (0)	0	0	0	9 (0)	3	0	0	49 (4)	8	0	0
17	FW	(Mexico) Jesús Corona	0 (1)	1	0	0	26 (8)	4	0	1	4 (1)	0	0	0	4 (1)	1	0	0	7 (1)	3	0	0	41 (12)	9	0	1
19	DF	(Democratic Republic of the Congo) Chancel Mbemba	0 (0)	0	0	0	1 (2)	0	0	0	1 (1)	0	0	0	1 (0)	0	0	0	0 (0)	0	0	0	3 (3)	0	0	0
20	FW	(Spain) Adrián López	0 (0)	0	0	0	3 (8)	0	0	0	6 (1)	0	0	0	2 (1)	1	0	0	1 (3)	0	0	0	12 (13)	1	0	0
21	FW	(Portugal) André Pereira	1 (0)	0	0	0	3 (6)	0	0	0	5 (0)	1	0	0	3 (0)	1	0	0	0 (4)	0	0	0	12 (10)	2	0	0
22	MF	(Portugal) Danilo Pereira	0 (0)	0	0	0	24 (2)	2	0	0	3 (1)	2	0	0	2 (1)	0	0	0	10 (0)	2	0	0	39 (4)	6	0	0
23	DF	(Brazil) João Pedro	0 (0)	0	0	0	0 (0)	0	0	0	1 (0)	0	0	0	2 (0)	0	0	0	0 (0)	0	0	0	3 (0)	0	0	0
25	MF	(Brazil) Otávio	1 (0)	0	0	0	19 (9)	3	0	0	4 (1)	0	0	0	2 (0)	1	0	0	6 (2)	2	0	0	32 (12)	6	0	0
26	GK	(Brazil) Vaná	0 (0)	0	0	0	3 (0)	0	0	0	1 (0)	0	0	0	5 (0)	0	0	0	0 (0)	0	0	0	9 (0)	0	0	0
28	DF	(Brazil) Felipe	1 (0)	0	0	0	31 (0)	10	0	0	7 (0)	1	1	0	4 (0)	2	0	0	10 (0)	2	0	0	53 (0)	15	1	0
29	FW	(Brazil) Soares	0 (1)	0	0	0	24 (4)	5	0	0	3 (2)	1	0	0	0 (3)	1	0	0	3 (1)	1	0	0	30 (11)	8	0	0
31	GK	(Portugal) Diogo Costa	0 (0)	0	0	0	0 (0)	0	0	0	0 (0)	0	0	0	0 (0)	0	0	0	0 (0)	0	0	0	0 (0)	0	0	0
33	DF	(Portugal) Pepe	0 (0)	0	0	0	13 (0)	4	0	0	3 (0)	1	0	0	2 (0)	0	0	0	3 (0)	2	0	0	21 (0)	7	0	0
37	FW	(Brazil) Fernando	0 (0)	0	0	0	1 (11)	1	0	0	3 (1)	0	0	0	0 (2)	0	0	0	1 (3)	0	0	0	5 (17)	1	0	0
40	GK	(Brazil) Fabiano	0 (0)	0	0	0	0 (0)	0	0	0	6 (0)	0	0	0	0 (0)	0	0	0	0 (0)	0	0	0	6 (0)	0	0	0
Totals				1	0	0		58	0	1		11	1	0		16	0	0		20	0	0		106	1	1

=== Goalscorers ===
Rank	No.	Pos.	Player	Supertaça	Primeira Liga	Taça de Portugal	Taça da Liga	Champions League	Total
1	29	FW	(Brazil) Soares	0	15	4	2	1	22
2	11	FW	(Mali) Moussa Marega	0	11	2	2	6	21
3	8	FW	(Algeria) Yacine Brahimi	1	10	1	1	0	13
4	16	MF	(Mexico) Héctor Herrera	0	6	1	0	2	9
5	17	FW	(Mexico) Jesús Corona	1	3	0	0	3	7
6	13	DF	(Brazil) Alex Telles	0	4	1	0	1	6
6	25	MF	(Brazil) Otávio	0	3	1	0	2	6
6	20	FW	(Spain) Adrián López	0	1	4	0	1	6
9	3	DF	(Brazil) Éder Militão	0	3	0	0	2	5
10	28	DF	(Brazil) Felipe	0	1	2	0	1	4
10	7	FW	(Portugal) Hernâni	0	1	2	1	0	4
10	9	FW	(Cameroon) Vincent Aboubakar	0	4	0	0	0	4
13	22	MF	(Portugal) Danilo Pereira	0	2	1	0	0	3
13	21	FW	(Portugal) André Pereira	0	1	1	1	0	3
15	33	DF	(Portugal) Pepe	0	2	0	0	0	2
15	10	MF	(Spain) Óliver Torres	0	2	0	0	0	2
15	37	FW	(Brazil) Fernando	0	0	0	2	0	2
18	4	DF	(Portugal) Diogo Leite	0	1	0	0	0	1
18	2	DF	(Uruguay) Maxi Pereira	1	0	0	0	0	1
18	12	DF	(Portugal) Wilson Manafá	0	1	0	0	0	1
18	14	FW	(Chad) Marius Mouandilmadji	0	1	0	0	0	1
Totals				3	72	20	9	19	123

=== Clean sheets ===
No.	Player	Supertaça	Primeira Liga	Taça de Portugal	Taça da Liga	Champions League	Total
1	(Spain) Iker Casillas	0	18	0	0	1	19
40	(Brazil) Fabiano	0	0	3	0	0	3
26	(Brazil) Vaná	0	2	0	0	0	2
Totals		0	20	3	0	1	24
