= Hernâni Fortes =

Portuguese footballer (born 1991)

Hernâni
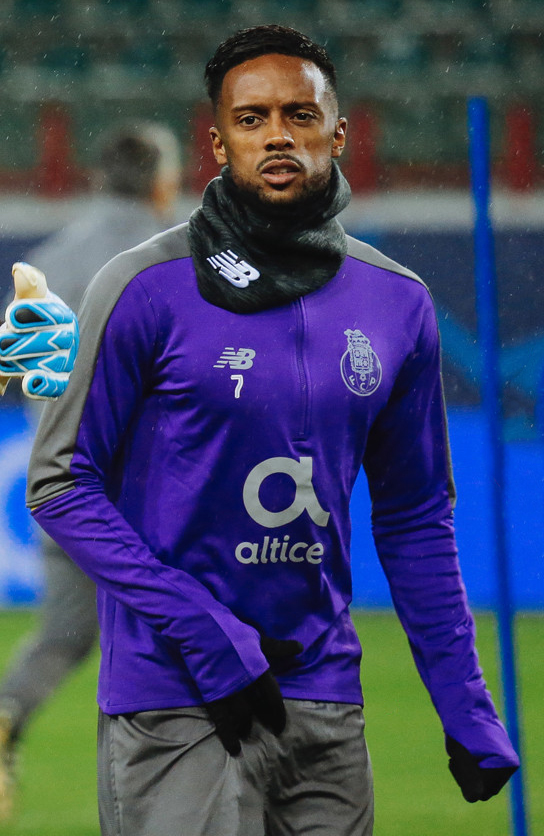
- Hernâni with Porto in 2018

Personal information
- Full name: Hernâni Jorge Santos Fortes
- Date of birth: 20 August 1991 (age 35)
- Place of birth: Lisbon, Portugal
- Height: 1.80 m (5 ft 11 in)
- Position: Winger

Youth career
- 2003–2009: Cova Piedade
- 2009–2010: Atlético

Senior career*
Years	Team	Apps	(Gls)
2010–2013	Atlético	42	(3)
2012	→ Mirandela (loan)	13	(4)
2013–2014	Vitória Guimarães B	30	(10)
2013–2015	Vitória Guimarães	25	(4)
2015–2019	Porto	30	(3)
2015–2016	→ Olympiacos (loan)	16	(4)
2016–2017	→ Vitória Guimarães (loan)	27	(8)
2018	Porto B	1	(0)
2019–2021	Levante	20	(2)
2020–2021	→ Al Wehda (loan)	27	(5)
2022	Las Palmas	5	(0)
2022–2024	Rio Ave	33	(2)
2024	Al-Najma	15	(3)
2024–2025	Osijek	24	(6)
2025–2026	Ferroviária	5	(0)
- * Club domestic league appearances and goals as of 15:49, 14 October 2025 (UTC)

Hernâni Jorge Santos Fortes (born 20 August 1991), known simply as Hernâni, is a Portuguese professional footballer who plays as a winger.

He played 115 Primeira Liga games for Vitória de Guimarães, Porto and Rio Ave, winning a league title with the second of those clubs in 2017–18. Abroad, he won Super League Greece with Olympiacos in 2015–16, and also competed in Spain, Saudi Arabia, Croatia and Brazil.

== Club career ==
=== Early years and Vitória ===
Born in Lisbon of Cape Verdean descent, Hernâni started playing with local Atlético Clube de Portugal. In the 2010–11 season he contributed 21 appearances – only one start – to help the club return to the Segunda Liga after a lengthy absence, making his debut in the competition on 4 September 2011 by coming on as a 73rd-minute substitute in a 2–1 away win against C.D. Santa Clara.

In January 2013, Hernâni signed a three-and-a-half-year contract with Vitória de Guimarães, being initially assigned to the B team in the second division. His first Primeira Liga appearance occurred on 28 April of that year, when he featured one minute in a 2–2 home draw with F.C. Paços de Ferreira. His first goal in the competition only arrived on 16 August 2014, but he scored a brace in a 3–1 away victory over Gil Vicente FC.

=== Porto ===
Hernâni joined FC Porto on the last day of the 2015 January transfer window, after scoring four goals for Vitória in the first half of the campaign. He played his first game precisely against his former side, when he replaced Ricardo Quaresma for the last minutes of the 1–0 home victory on 13 February.

Hernâni moved to Olympiacos F.C. of the Super League Greece on 31 August 2015, in a season-long loan. On 3 April 2016, he netted twice for the second consecutive league match to help to a 4–0 home win over Panthrakikos FC, going on to finish with 26 appearances and eight goals in all competitions.

In the summer of 2016, still owned by Porto, Hernâni returned to Guimarães in a season-long move. He scored 12 times overall during his second spell in the Minho Province, and his goal against C.F. Os Belenenses (1–1 away draw) was also voted the league's best.

=== Later career ===
On 2 July 2019, Hernâni signed a three-year deal with Levante UD. He scored his first La Liga goal on 24 September, but in a 3–1 away loss to Real Betis. He repeated the feat in the next match, but was also sent off for two bookable offences in the 1–1 draw against CA Osasuna at the Estadi Ciutat de València.

Hernâni joined Al Wehda FC of the Saudi Professional League on 13 October 2020, on loan. One year later, he was released by his parent club.

On 27 December 2021, Hernâni agreed to a six-month contract with UD Las Palmas in the Spanish Segunda División. Having played just five games – all off the bench – in his only season in the Canary Islands, he returned to his country's top flight on 9 August at Rio Ave F.C. on a one-year deal with the option of a second. He made his debut 19 days later in a brief cameo in a 3–1 home win over former club and title holders Porto.

Hernâni terminated his contract with Rio Ave by mutual agreement in January 2024 and went back to Saudi Arabia, signing with Al-Najma SC of the First Division League until 30 June. In August, he joined Croatian Football League side NK Osijek, where his compatriot José Boto worked as director of football.

On 29 July 2025, Hernâni moved to Associação Ferroviária de Esportes of the Campeonato Brasileiro Série B. Five months later, he left.

== Career statistics ==
As of match played 23 December 2023

Appearances and goals by club, season and competition
Club	Season	League			National cup		League Cup		Continental		Other		Total	
Club	Season	Division	Apps	Goals	Apps	Goals	Apps	Goals	Apps	Goals	Apps	Goals	Apps	Goals
Atlético	2010–11	Segunda Divisão	21	0	4	0	—		—		—		25	0
Atlético	2011–12	Liga de Honra	2	0	1	0	0	0	—		—		3	0
Atlético	2012–13	Segunda Liga	19	3	1	0	1	0	—		—		21	3
Atlético	Total		42	3	6	0	1	0	—		—		49	3
Mirandela (loan)	2011–12	Segunda Divisão	13	4	0	0	—		—		—		13	4
Vitória Guimarães B	2012–13	Segunda Liga	5	1	—		—		—		—		5	1
Vitória Guimarães B	2013–14	Campeonato Nacional de Seniores	24	9	—		—		—		2 (Note: Appearances in Campeonato Nacional de Seniores promotion play-off)	0	26	9
Vitória Guimarães B	2014–15	Segunda Liga	1	0	—		—		—		—		1	0
Vitória Guimarães B	Total		30	10	—		—		—		2	0	32	10
Vitória Guimarães	2012–13	Primeira Liga	3	0	0	0	0	0	—		—		3	0
Vitória Guimarães	2013–14	Primeira Liga	4	0	0	0	0	0	0	0	0	0	4	0
Vitória Guimarães	2014–15	Primeira Liga	18	4	2	0	1	0	—		—		21	4
Vitória Guimarães	Total		25	4	2	0	1	0	0	0	0	0	28	4
Porto	2014–15	Primeira Liga	8	2	0	0	1	0	1 (Note: Appearances in UEFA Champions League)	0	—		10	2
Porto	2017–18	Primeira Liga	12	0	4	1	1	0	2	0	—		19	1
Porto	2018–19	Primeira Liga	10	1	3	2	4	1	6	0	0	0	23	4
Porto	Total		30	3	7	3	6	1	9	0	0	0	52	7
Olympiacos (loan)	2015–16	Super League Greece	16	4	5	4	—		5	0	—		26	8
Vitória Guimarães (loan)	2016–17	Primeira Liga	27	8	6	3	2	1	—		—		35	12
Porto B	2017–18	LigaPro	1	0	—		—		—		—		1	0
Levante	2019–20	La Liga	20	2	3	1	—		—		—		23	3
Al Wehda (loan)	2020–21	Saudi Pro League	27	5	1	0	—		0	0	—		28	5
Las Palmas	2021–22	Segunda División	5	0	0	0	—		—		—		5	0
Rio Ave	2022–23	Primeira Liga	21	2	1	0	2	0	—		—		24	2
Rio Ave	2023–24	Primeira Liga	12	0	1	0	2	0	—		—		15	0
Rio Ave	Total		33	2	2	0	4	0	—		—		39	2
Al-Najma	2023–24	Saudi First Division League	0	0	0	0	—		—		—		0	0
Career total			269	45	32	11	14	2	14	0	2	0	331	58

== Honours ==
Olympiacos

- Super League Greece: 2015–16

Porto

- Primeira Liga: 2017–18
- Supertaça Cândido de Oliveira: 2018
