= Óliver Torres =

Spanish footballer (born 1994)

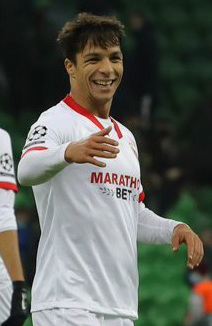
- Torres with Sevilla in 2020

Personal information
- Full name: Óliver Torres Muñoz
- Date of birth: 10 November 1994 (age 32)
- Place of birth: Navalmoral de la Mata, Spain
- Height: 1.76 m (5 ft 9 1/2 in)
- Position: Midfielder

Team information
- Current team: Monterrey
- Number: 8

Youth career
- 2008–2012: Atlético Madrid

Senior career*
Years	Team	Apps	(Gls)
2012–2013	Atlético Madrid B	21	(3)
2012–2017	Atlético Madrid	36	(1)
2014	→ Villarreal (loan)	9	(0)
2014–2015	→ Porto (loan)	26	(7)
2016–2017	→ Porto (loan)	18	(2)
2017–2019	Porto	55	(3)
2019–2024	Sevilla	146	(8)
2024–	Monterrey	78	(8)

International career
2012	Spain U18	2	(0)
2012–2013	Spain U19	10	(0)
2013	Spain U20	7	(0)
2013–2016	Spain U21	24	(3)
- * Club domestic league appearances and goals as of 18:07, 27 September 2026 (UTC)

Óliver Torres Muñoz (Spanish pronunciation: [ˈoliβeɾ ˈtores]; born 10 November 1994) is a Spanish professional footballer who plays as a central or attacking midfielder for Liga MX club Monterrey.

After starting out at Atlético Madrid he went on spend several years in Portugal with Porto since first joining on loan in 2014, winning the Primeira Liga in the 2017–18 season. In July 2019, he signed for Sevilla, going on to make 201 competitive appearances and win the Europa League twice.

Torres won 43 caps for Spain across all youth levels and scored three goals.

== Club career ==
=== Atlético Madrid ===
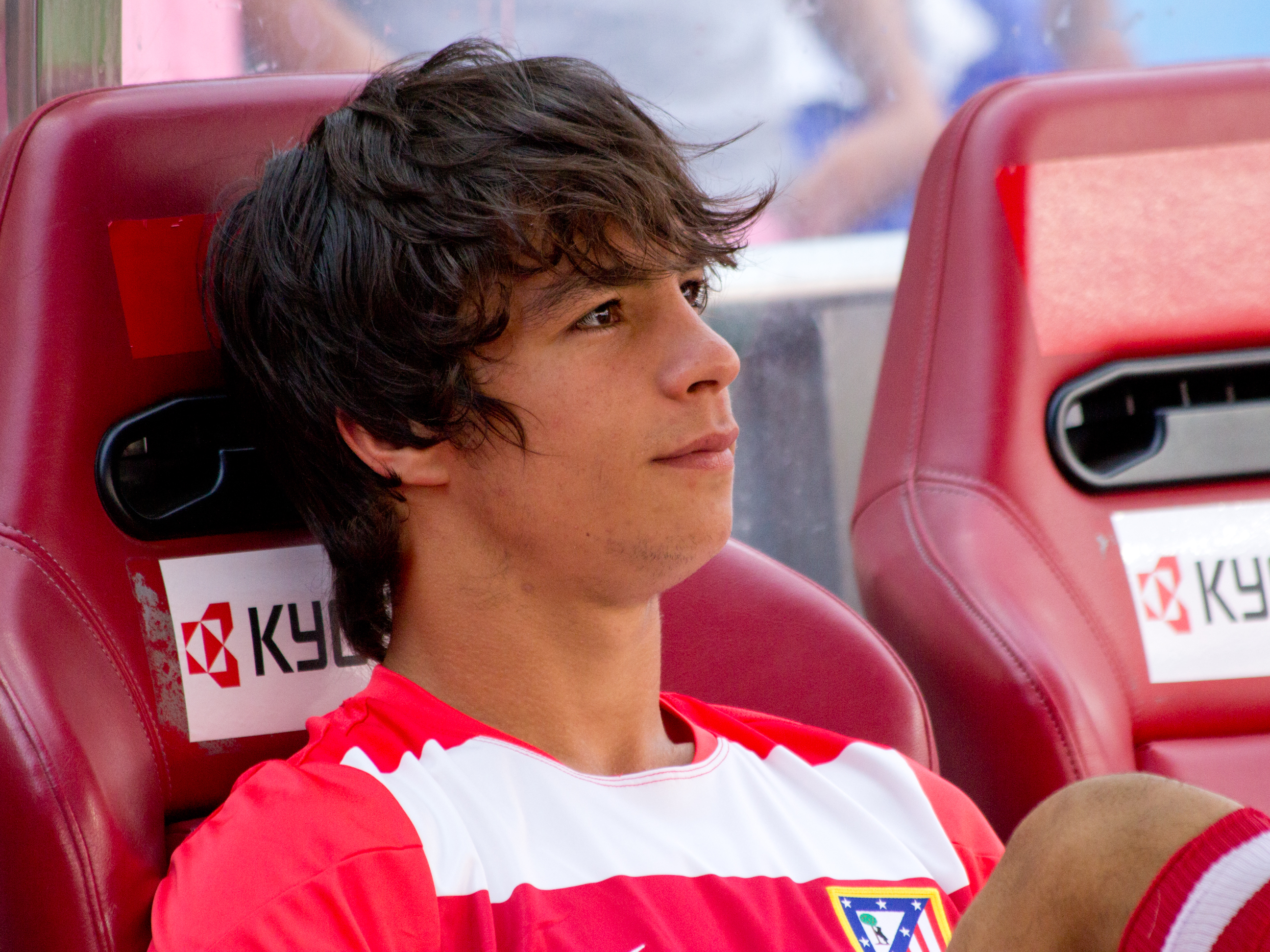
Torres on the bench for Atlético Madrid in 2013

Born in Navalmoral de la Mata, Cáceres, Extremadura, Torres joined Atlético Madrid in the summer of 2008 at age 13. He spent four years progressing through the youth ranks before being introduced to the first team by manager Diego Simeone.

In late April 2012, despite not yet having featured for the club's reserves, Torres was called up to the main squad for a La Liga game against Real Betis. On 19 August, in the 2012–13 season opener, he made his professional debut, coming on as a substitute for Adrián López in the 64th minute of the 1–1 away draw with Levante UD.

Torres made his first appearance in the UEFA Champions League on 1 October 2013 at the age of 18 years and 10 months, replacing the injured Raúl García for the last 12 minutes of a 2–1 away win over FC Porto in the group stage, becoming the Colchoneros' fourth-youngest player to do so. On the 27th, he scored his first official goal with the main squad, netting after 12 seconds in an eventual 5–0 home rout of Betis.

On 31 January 2014, Atlético loaned Torres to fellow top-division side Villarreal CF until the end of the campaign, his opportunities having been disadvantaged by the club's acquisition of Diego. He said of the deal, "I will try to learn as much as I can in this period and continue growing as a footballer and person." He made his debut on 2 March, playing the second half of the 1–1 home draw against Betis, and started for the first time with his new team six days later, in a 2–0 loss at Granada CF.

=== Porto ===
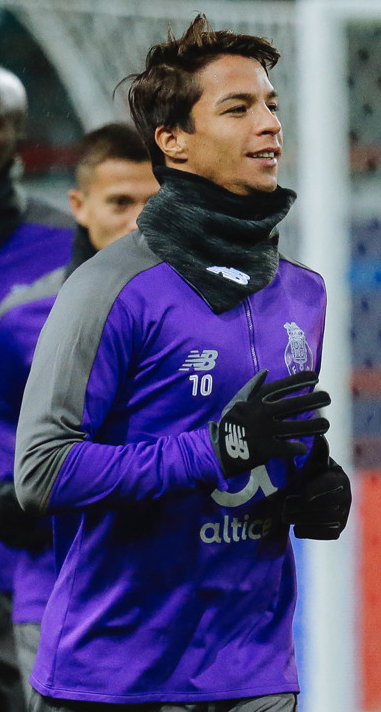
Torres with Porto in 2018

On 3 July 2014, Torres was loaned to Porto in a season-long loan deal. He made his Primeira Liga debut on 15 August in a 2–0 victory over C.S. Marítimo at the Estádio do Dragão, playing the full 90 minutes. On 31 August he scored his first goal for his new team, opening a 3–0 home win against Moreirense F.C. in the 70th minute.

Torres was nominated for the 2014 Golden Boy Award. On 25 August 2016 he rejoined the Portuguese in another loan move, which was made permanent the following 9 February for a fee of €20 million.

Torres contributed 19 league games in 2017–18, helping to conquer the domestic league after a five-year wait. On 4 August 2018, he replaced André Pereira after 72 minutes in the 3–1 defeat of C.D. Aves in the Supertaça Cândido de Oliveira, providing the assist for Jesús Manuel Corona in the last goal.

=== Sevilla ===
On 15 July 2019, Torres signed a five-year contract with Sevilla FC. He finished his first year at the Ramón Sánchez Pizjuán Stadium with 37 competitive appearances, including five in the side's victorious run in the UEFA Europa League.

Torres celebrated his 200th game for the Andalusians on 14 April 2024, in a 2–0 away win over UD Las Palmas. On 30 May, he announced he would be leaving when his link expired the following month.

=== Monterrey ===
On 8 June 2024, Torres joined Liga MX club C.F. Monterrey on a three-year deal.

== International career ==
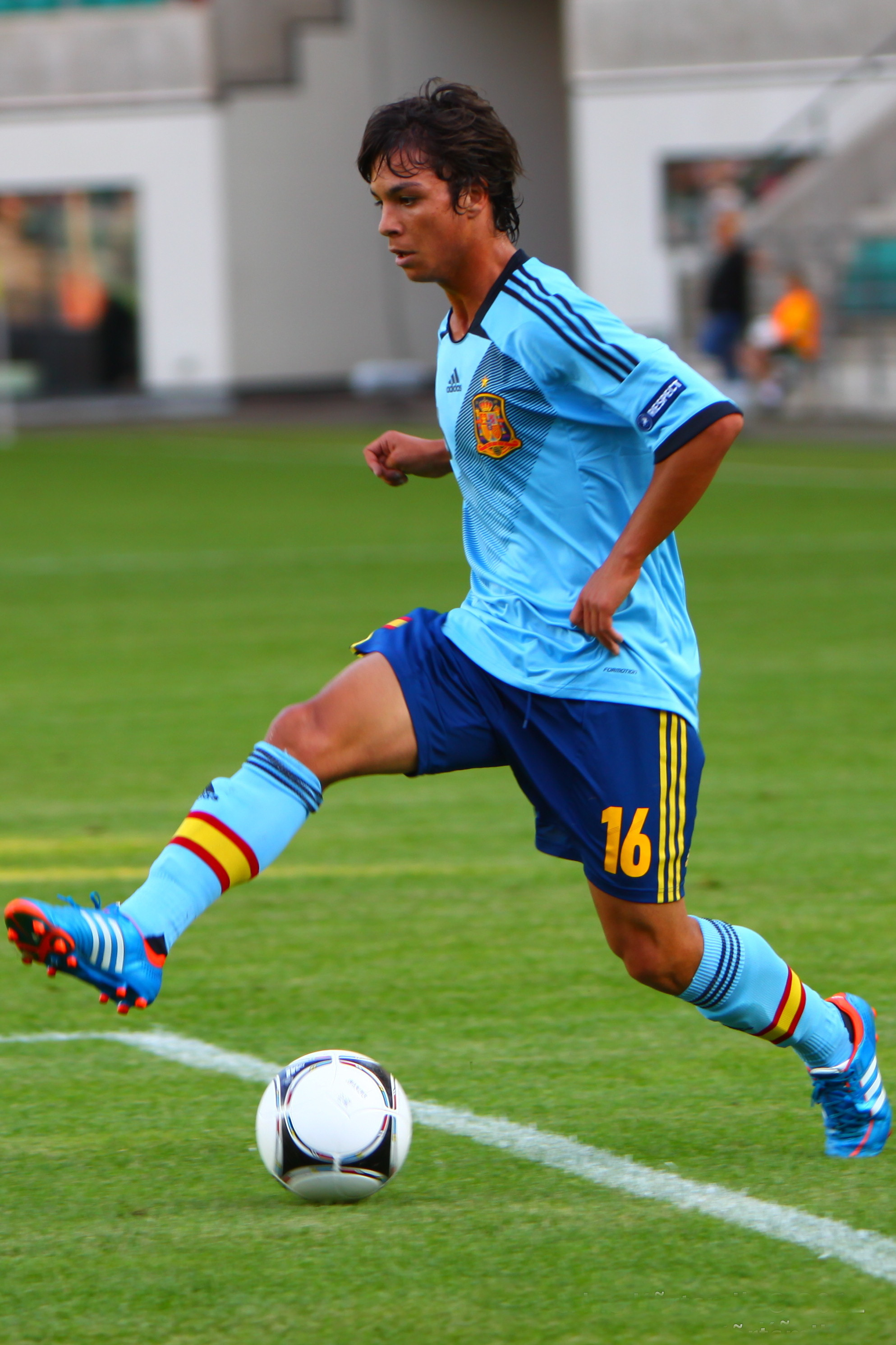
Torres playing at the 2012 European Under-19 Championship

Torres was a member of the Spain team that won the 2012 UEFA European Under-19 Championship in Estonia. He played the entirety of the final on 15 July, in which the nation defeated Greece 1–0 in Tallinn.

Torres was part of the under-20 squad at the 2013 FIFA World Cup in Turkey, featuring in all five matches as the side reached the quarter-finals. He made his debut for the under-21s on 5 September 2013, replacing Suso for the final nine minutes of a 6–2 away victory against Austria at the start of Euro 2015 qualifiers.

Torres scored his first goals on 14 November on his fifth under-21 cap, grabbing a brace in a 6–1 defeat of Bosnia and Herzegovina in Zenica also in the European Championship qualifying phase.

== Career statistics ==
As of match played on 1 July 2025

Appearances and goals by club, season and competition
Club	Season	League			National cup (Note: Includes Copa del Rey, Taça de Portugal)		League cup (Note: Includes Taça da Liga)		Continental		Other		Total	
Club	Season	Division	Apps	Goals	Apps	Goals	Apps	Goals	Apps	Goals	Apps	Goals	Apps	Goals
Atlético Madrid	2012–13	La Liga	8	0	2	0	—		0	0	—		10	0
Atlético Madrid	2013–14	La Liga	7	1	2	0	—		4 (Note: Appearances in UEFA Champions League)	0	1 (Note: Appearance in Supercopa de España)	0	14	1
Atlético Madrid	2015–16	La Liga	21	0	5	0	—		7	1	—		33	1
Atlético Madrid	Total		36	1	9	0	—		11	1	1	0	57	2
Villarreal (loan)	2013–14	La Liga	9	0	0	0	—		—		—		9	0
Porto (loan)	2014–15	Primeira Liga	26	7	1	0	3	0	10	0	—		40	7
Porto (loan)	2016–17	Primeira Liga	29	3	1	0	2	0	7	0	—		39	3
Porto	2017–18	Primeira Liga	19	0	4	0	2	0	3	0	—		28	0
Porto	2018–19	Primeira Liga	25	2	5	0	3	0	5	0	1 (Note: Appearance in Supertaça Cândido de Oliveira)	0	39	2
Porto	Total		99	12	11	0	10	0	25	0	1	0	146	12
Sevilla	2019–20	La Liga	28	3	4	2	—		5 (Note: Appearances in UEFA Europa League)	1	—		37	6
Sevilla	2020–21	La Liga	33	0	6	0	—		7	0	1 (Note: Appearance in UEFA Super Cup)	0	47	0
Sevilla	2021–22	La Liga	26	2	4	0	—		8 (Note: Four appearances in UEFA Champions League, four appearances in UEFA Europa League)	0	—		38	2
Sevilla	2022–23	La Liga	32	3	4	0	—		8	0	—		44	3
Sevilla	2023–24	La Liga	27	0	4	0	—		3	0	1	0	35	0
Sevilla	Total		146	8	22	2	—		31	1	2	0	201	11
Monterrey	2024–25	Liga MX	36	6	—		—		4 (Note: Appearance in CONCACAF Champions Cup)	0	3 (Note: Appearances in FIFA Club World Cup)	0	43	6
Career total			326	27	42	2	10	0	71	2	7	0	456	33

== Honours ==
Atlético Madrid

- La Liga: 2013–14
- Copa del Rey: 2012–13
- Supercopa de España runner-up: 2013
- UEFA Champions League runner-up: 2013–14, 2015–16

Porto

- Primeira Liga: 2017–18
- Supertaça Cândido de Oliveira: 2018

Sevilla

- UEFA Europa League: 2019–20, 2022–23
- UEFA Super Cup runner-up: 2020, 2023

Spain U19

- UEFA European Under-19 Championship: 2012

Individual

- Primeira Liga Breakthrough Player of the Year: 2014–15
- UEFA European Under-19 Championship Team of the Tournament: 2012
