= 2018 Supertaça Cândido de Oliveira =

- Event: Supertaça Cândido de Oliveira (Portuguese Super Cup)
Porto	Desportivo das Aves
3	1
- Date: 4 August 2018
- Venue: Estádio Municipal de Aveiro, Aveiro
- Man of the Match: Maxi Pereira (Porto)
- Referee: Luís Godinho
- Attendance: 28,560

The 2018 Supertaça Cândido de Oliveira was the 40th edition of the Supertaça Cândido de Oliveira. It was played on 4 August 2018 at the Estádio Municipal de Aveiro between the winners of the 2017–18 Primeira Liga, Porto, and the winners of the 2017–18 Taça de Portugal, Desportivo das Aves. Porto won 3–1 and to secure their first Supertaça title since 2013 and extend their record to 21 titles overall.

== Venue ==
The Estádio Municipal de Aveiro was announced as the venue for both the 2017 and 2018 editions of Supertaça Cândido de Oliveira on 6 June 2017, following the decision of the Portuguese Football Federation Directive Board. This was the ninth time that this stadium hosted the Supertaça Cândido de Oliveira, after 2009, 2010, 2011, 2012, 2013, 2014, 2016 and 2017.

== Match ==
=== Details ===
4 August 2018
20:45 WEST (UTC+01:00)

Porto	3–1	Desportivo das Aves
Brahimi 25'; M. Pereira 67'; Corona 84'	Report	Claudio Falcão 14'

Estádio Municipal de Aveiro, Aveiro
Attendance: 28,560
Referee: Luís Godinho

Porto	Desportivo das Aves

GK	1	(Spain) Iker Casillas
RB	2	(Uruguay) Maxi Pereira
CB	4	(Portugal) Diogo Leite
CB	28	(Brazil) Felipe
LB	13	(Brazil) Alex Telles
RW	25	(Brazil) Otávio
CM	16	(Mexico) Héctor Herrera (c)
CM	27	(Portugal) Sérgio Oliveira	(yellow card) 57'
LW	8	(Algeria) Yacine Brahimi	(substituted off) 39'
CF	9	(Cameroon) Vincent Aboubakar	(substituted off) 75'
CF	21	(Portugal) André Pereira	(substituted off) 71'
Substitutes:
GK	26	(Brazil) Vaná
DF	5	(Nigeria) Chidozie Awaziem
MF	10	(Spain) Óliver	(substituted in) 71'
FW	17	(Mexico) Jesús Corona	(substituted in) 39' (yellow card) 84'
FW	7	(Portugal) Hernâni
FW	20	(Spain) Adrián
FW	29	(Brazil) Soares	(substituted in) 75'
Manager:
(Portugal) Sérgio Conceição

GK	24	(France) Quentin Beunardeau
RB	2	(Brazil) Rodrigo
CB	44	(Brazil) Diego Galo
CB	46	(Brazil) Jorge Fellipe
LB	21	(Portugal) Nélson Lenho (c)
CM	29	(Brazil) Claudio Falcão	(yellow card) 36'
CM	30	(Portugal) Vítor Gomes
RW	23	(Brazil) Amilton	(substituted off) 85'
AM	8	(Portugal) Bruno Braga	(substituted off) 70'
LW	16	(Brazil) Nildo Petrolina	(substituted off) 77' (yellow card) 27'
CF	33	(Brazil) Derley
Substitutes:
GK	1	(Portugal) Marco Pinto
DF	5	(Brazil) Rodrigo Defendi
DF	26	(Cape Verde) Carlos Ponck
MF	13	(Guinea-Bissau) Bura
FW	11	(Argentina) Luis Fariña	(substituted in) 77'
FW	50	(Guinea-Bissau) Mama Baldé	(substituted in) 85'
FW	9	(Brazil) Michel Douglas	(substituted in) 70'
Manager:
(Portugal) José Mota

Man of the match

- (Uruguay) Maxi Pereira (Porto)

Assistant referees:

- Ricardo Santos
- Pedro Ribeiro

Fourth official:

- Hélder Malheiro

Video assistant referees:

- Bruno Esteves
- Luís Ferreira

Match rules

- 90 minutes.
- 30 minutes of extra time if necessary.
- Penalty shoot-out if scores still level.
- Seven named substitutes, of which up to three may be used during regular time.
- Fourth substitution in case of extra time.

== See also ==
- 2018–19 Primeira Liga
- 2018–19 Taça de Portugal
- 2018–19 Taça da Liga
- 2018–19 FC Porto season
