= Diogo Leite (footballer, born 1999) =

Portuguese footballer (born 1999)

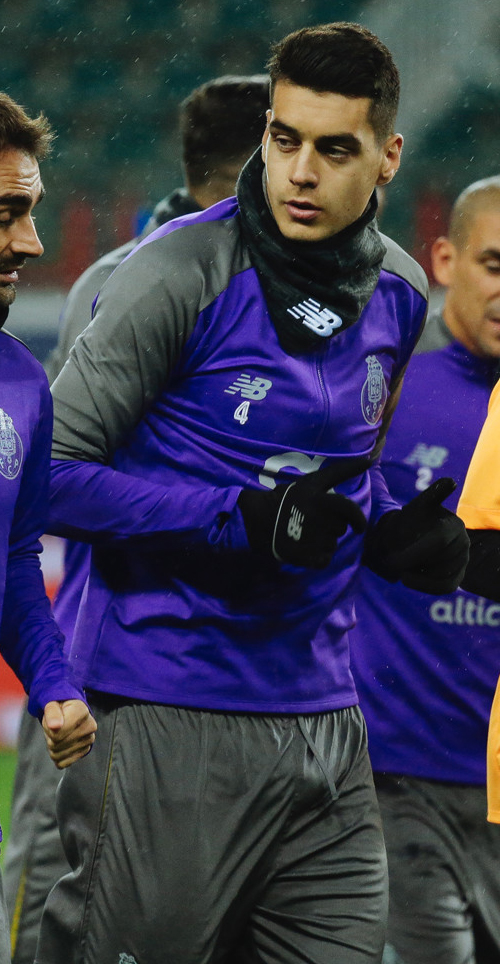
- Leite with Porto in 2018

Personal information
- Full name: Diogo Filipe Monteiro Pinto Leite
- Date of birth: 23 January 1999 (age 27)
- Place of birth: Porto, Portugal
- Height: 1.90 m (6 ft 3 in)
- Position: Centre-back

Team information
- Current team: Lazio
- Number: 2

Youth career
- 2007–2008: Leixões
- 2008–2018: Porto
- 2014–2015: → Padroense (loan)

Senior career*
Years	Team	Apps	(Gls)
2017–2021	Porto B	47	(1)
2018–2023	Porto	31	(2)
2021–2022	→ Braga (loan)	23	(0)
2022–2023	→ Union Berlin (loan)	28	(0)
2023–2026	Union Berlin	85	(1)
2026–	Lazio	2	(0)

International career
2014–2015	Portugal U16	9	(1)
2015–2016	Portugal U17	16	(0)
2017	Portugal U18	5	(0)
2017–2018	Portugal U19	10	(0)
2017–2019	Portugal U20	8	(0)
2018–2021	Portugal U21	22	(2)
Medal record
Men's football
Representing Portugal
UEFA European Under-21 Championship
Runner-up	2021 Hungary–Slovenia
UEFA European Under-19 Championship
Runner-up	2017 Georgia
UEFA European Under-17 Championship
Winner	2016 Azerbaijan
- * Club domestic league appearances and goals as of 15:24, 17 October 2026 (UTC)

Diogo Filipe Monteiro Pinto Leite (born 23 January 1999) is a Portuguese professional footballer who plays as a centre-back for Serie A club Lazio.

== Club career ==
=== Porto ===
Born in Porto, Leite joined FC Porto's youth academy at the age of 9. He made his professional debut with the reserve team on 27 August 2017, playing the entire 1–0 home win against C.D. Santa Clara in the LigaPro.

In late July 2018, due to several injuries to the back sector, first-team manager Sérgio Conceição called Leite for the upcoming Supertaça Cândido de Oliveira match against C.D. Aves; he partnered Felipe in that match, a 3–1 victory in Aveiro. Shortly before that event, he had renewed his contract until 2023.

Leite's maiden appearance in the Primeira Liga took place on 11 August 2018 in the season opener, and he again played the entire 5–0 home defeat of G.D. Chaves. He scored his first goal in the competition the following weekend, helping to a 3–2 victory at B-SAD; shortly after, however, he returned to the reserves.

On 31 August 2021, Leite was loaned to S.C. Braga for one year. He made 34 competitive appearances during his spell at the Estádio Municipal de Braga, but only five in the last three months.

=== Union Berlin ===
In July 2022, still owned by Porto, Leite joined 1. FC Union Berlin with a buying option. After a successful first season, helping the Bundesliga club to secure qualification for the UEFA Champions League for the first time in its history and totalling 40 games, he signed a permanent deal for €7.500.000.

Leite scored his first official goal on 13 August 2023, contributing to a 4–0 away win over amateurs FC Astoria Walldorf in the first round of the DFB-Pokal. His only in the league came on 19 April 2025, when he put the hosts ahead 2–0 in an eventual 4–4 draw against VfB Stuttgart; all the other seven were scored still in the first half.

On 19 May 2026, Leite confirmed he would leave Union on 30 June when his contract expired.

=== Lazio ===
Leite agreed to a two-year contract at SS Lazio on 8 September 2026, with the possibility of a two-year extension; he arrived at the side in the same transfer window as his Union teammate Danilho Doekhi.

== International career ==
Leite won his first cap for Portugal at under-21 level at the age of only 19, coming on as a second-half substitute in a 3–2 friendly win over Italy. He was later used as a starter by coach Rui Jorge in both legs of the 2019 UEFA European Championship play-offs, lost to Poland 3–1 on aggregate.

In October 2022, Leite was named in a preliminary 55-man squad for the 2022 FIFA World Cup in Qatar. On 26 March 2023, he remained on the bench of a 6–0 victory in Luxembourg for the UEFA Euro 2024 qualifiers.

== Career statistics ==
As of match played 16 May 2026

Club	Season	League			National Cup (Note: Includes Taça de Portugal and DFB-Pokal)		League Cup (Note: Includes Taça da Liga)		Continental		Other		Total	
Club	Season	Division	Apps	Goals	Apps	Goals	Apps	Goals	Apps	Goals	Apps	Goals	Apps	Goals
Porto B	2017–18	LigaPro	28	0	—		—		—		3 (Note: Appearances in Premier League International Cup)	0	31	0
Porto B	2018–19	LigaPro	16	1	—		—		—		—		16	1
Porto B	2019–20	LigaPro	2	0	—		—		—		—		2	0
Porto B	2020–21	LigaPro	1	0	—		—		—		—		1	0
Porto B	Total		47	1	—		—		—		3	0	50	1
Porto	2018–19	Primeira Liga	3	1	0	0	1	0	1 (Note: Appearances in UEFA Champions League)	0	1 (Note: Appearance in Supertaça Cândido de Oliveira)	0	6	1
Porto	2019–20	Primeira Liga	9	0	6	0	2	1	1 (Note: Appearances in UEFA Europa League)	0	—		18	1
Porto	2020–21	Primeira Liga	19	1	2	0	2	0	3	0	1	0	27	1
Porto	Total		31	2	8	0	5	1	5	0	2	0	51	3
Braga (loan)	2021–22	Primeira Liga	23	0	3	0	2	0	6	0	0	0	34	0
Union Berlin (loan)	2022–23	Bundesliga	28	0	3	0	—		9	0	—		40	0
Union Berlin	2023–24	Bundesliga	32	0	2	1	—		6	0	—		40	1
Union Berlin	2024–25	Bundesliga	30	1	1	0	—		—		—		31	1
Union Berlin	2025–26	Bundesliga	23	0	2	0	—		—		—		25	0
Union Berlin	Total		113	1	8	1	—		15	0	—		136	2
Career total			214	4	19	1	7	1	26	0	5	0	271	6

== Honours ==
Porto Youth

- UEFA Youth League: 2018–19

Porto

- Primeira Liga: 2019–20
- Taça de Portugal: 2019–20
- Supertaça Cândido de Oliveira: 2018, 2020

Portugal

- UEFA European Under-17 Championship: 2016

Individual

- UEFA European Under-17 Championship Team of the Tournament: 2016
- Primeira Liga Defender of the Month: August 2018
