= Otávio (footballer, born 1995) =

Association football player (born 1995)

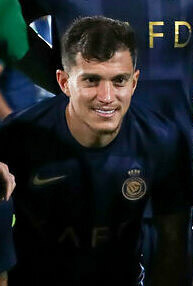
- Otávio with Al-Nassr in 2023

Personal information
- Full name: Otávio Edmilson da Silva Monteiro
- Date of birth: 9 February 1995 (age 31)
- Place of birth: João Pessoa, Brazil
- Height: 1.72 m (5 ft 8 in)
- Positions: Attacking midfielder; winger

Team information
- Current team: Al-Rayyan (on loan from Al-Qadsiah)
- Number: 25

Youth career
- 2006–2010: Santa Cruz
- 2010–2012: Internacional

Senior career*
| Years | Team | Apps | (Gls) |
| 2012–2014 | Internacional | 55 | (6) |
| 2014–2015 | Porto B | 6 | (2) |
| 2014–2023 | Porto | 183 | (19) |
| 2015–2016 | → Vitória SC (loan) | 35 | (7) |
| 2015–2016 | → Vitória SC B (loan) | 2 | (0) |
| 2023–2025 | Al-Nassr | 57 | (11) |
| 2025– | Al-Qadsiah | 16 | (0) |
| 2026– | → Al-Rayyan (loan) | 0 | (0) |

International career^{‡}
| 2014–2015 | Brazil U20 | 4 | (1) |
| 2021–2024 | Portugal | 22 | (3) |
- * Club domestic league appearances and goals as of 16:29, 06 September 2026 (UTC) ‡ National team caps and goals as of 23:27, 18 November 2024 (UTC)

Otávio Edmilson da Silva Monteiro (born 9 February 1995), commonly known as Otávio or Otavinho, is a professional footballer who plays as an attacking midfielder for Qatar Stars League club Al-Rayyan on loan from Saudi Pro League club Al-Qadsiah.

Born and raised in Brazil, he signed with Portuguese Primeira Liga side Porto in 2014 as a free agent. He was immediately sent two-year loan deal to Vitória de Guimarães, before returning in 2016. After returning he became a starter, and won three Primeira Liga titles, two Taça de Portugal and two Supertaças Cândido de Oliveira, while being part of the squad that won two domestic doubles in 2020 and 2022, making over 200 official appearances for them.

Otávio represented his native country Brazil internationally at the under-20 level in 2014, but switched allegiance at the senior international level to Portugal, making his senior international debut in 2021.

== Club career ==
=== Internacional ===
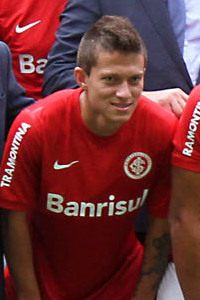
Otávio with Internacional in 2014

Born in João Pessoa, Paraíba, Otávio finished his development at Internacional after joining the Porto Alegre club's academy at the age of 15. He made his Série A debut only two years later, coming on as a second-half substitute in the 0–0 home draw against Santos on 15 July.

Otávio's first league goal arrived on 8 June 2013, when he started and helped to a 2–2 away draw to Cruzeiro. He added a further five during the season, in a 13th-place finish.

Otávio credited manager Dunga for helping him overcome his weight problems. During his spell at the Estádio Beira-Rio, he netted seven times in 62 competitive matches.

=== Porto ===
On 1 September 2014, even though it was originally thought the transfer had cost €5 million, Otávio joined FC Porto as a free agent after Internacional ceded his federative rights, and signed a five-year contract with a €50 million buyout clause. He was initially assigned to the reserve team, who competed in the Segunda Liga.

In the last day of the 2015 January transfer window, Otávio, Ivo Rodrigues and Leocísio Sami were loaned to Vitória SC in the Primeira Liga. He made his debut in the competition on 8 February by playing 30 minutes in a 0–1 home loss against Belenenses, and scored his first goal in the last matchday of the campaign to help the visitors beat Académica de Coimbra 4–2.

The deal was extended for the entire 2015–16, and his performances while on loan earned him a contract extension with Porto subsequently. He made his competitive debut for the latter on 12 August 2016, starting in the 3–1 away defeat of Rio Ave.

Otávio won the Portuguese League at the end of his second season, contributing two goals from 15 appearances. He was sidelined for several weeks during the tournament, due to injury problems.

During the 2019–20 campaign, Otávio featured in 48 games and scored two goals, helping the team conquer the double. As a result, he was included in the league's Best XI.

=== Al Nassr ===
On 22 August 2023, Saudi Pro League side Al Nassr announced the signing of Otávio on a three-year contract, after activating the player's €60 million release clause, making him both the most expensive player in the Saudi club's history and Porto's highest ever sale.

=== Al Qadsiah ===
On 9 September 2025, Otávio signed for Al-Qadsiah on a two-year deal.

==== Loan to Al-Rayyan ====
On 4 September 2026, Otávio joined Qatar Stars League club Al-Rayyan on a one-season loan, with an obligation to buy.

== International career ==
=== Brazil ===
Shortly after making his Internacional debut, Otávio was selected to the Brazil under-20 side by Alexandre Gallo.

=== Portugal ===
Otávio became a Portuguese citizen in March 2021. On 26 August of that year, he was called up to the Portugal national team by Fernando Santos for 2022 FIFA World Cup qualifiers against the Republic of Ireland and Azerbaijan and a friendly with Qatar. He made his debut against the latter, scoring in the 3–1 win at the Nagyerdei Stadion in Debrecen, Hungary.

On 24 March 2022, Otávio scored his second goal, opening an eventual 3–1 home victory over Turkey in the semi-finals of the World Cup qualification play-offs and later providing an assist for Diogo Jota.

In October, he was named in Portugal's preliminary 55-man squad for the 2022 FIFA World Cup in Qatar, being included in the final 26-man squad for the tournament.

On 21 May 2024, he was selected in the 26-man squad for the UEFA Euro 2024. However, on 3 June, he was withdrawn due to injury.

== Career statistics ==
=== Club ===
As of match played 17 August 2026

Appearances and goals by club, season and competition
| Club | Season | League | | | State league (Note: Includes Campeonato Gaúcho) | | National cup (Note: Includes Copa do Brasil, Taça de Portugal, King's Cup) | | League cup (Note: Includes Taça da Liga) | | Continental | | Other | | Total | |
| Club | Season | Division | Apps | Goals | Apps | Goals | Apps | Goals | Apps | Goals | Apps | Goals | Apps | Goals | Apps | Goals |
|---|---|---|---|---|---|---|---|---|---|---|---|---|---|---|---|---|
| Internacional | 2012 | Série A | 7 | 0 | 0 | 0 | 0 | 0 | — | | 0 | 0 | — | | 7 | 0 |
| Internacional | 2013 | Série A | 26 | 6 | 7 | 0 | 6 | 1 | — | | — | | — | | 39 | 7 |
| Internacional | 2014 | Série A | 6 | 0 | 9 | 0 | 1 | 0 | — | | 0 | 0 | — | | 16 | 0 |
| Internacional | Total | | 39 | 6 | 16 | 0 | 7 | 1 | — | | 0 | 0 | — | | 62 | 7 |
| Porto B | 2014–15 | Segunda Liga | 6 | 2 | — | | — | | — | | — | | — | | 6 | 2 |
| Porto | 2016–17 | Primeira Liga | 23 | 1 | — | | 2 | 1 | — | | 8 (Note: Appearances in UEFA Champions League) | 1 | — | | 33 | 3 |
| Porto | 2017–18 | Primeira Liga | 15 | 2 | — | | 3 | 1 | 1 | 0 | 2 | 0 | — | | 21 | 3 |
| Porto | 2018–19 | Primeira Liga | 28 | 3 | — | | 5 | 1 | 2 | 0 | 8 | 2 | 1 (Note: Appearance in Supertaça Cândido de Oliveira) | 0 | 44 | 6 |
| Porto | 2019–20 | Primeira Liga | 31 | 2 | — | | 5 | 0 | 4 | 0 | 8 (Note: One appearance in UEFA Champions League, seven appearances in UEFA Europa League) | 0 | — | | 48 | 2 |
| Porto | 2020–21 | Primeira Liga | 26 | 3 | — | | 5 | 1 | 1 | 0 | 9 | 1 | 1 | 0 | 42 | 5 |
| Porto | 2021–22 | Primeira Liga | 32 | 3 | — | | 7 | 2 | 1 | 0 | 9 (Note: Six appearances in UEFA Champions League, three appearances in UEFA Europa League) | 0 | — | | 49 | 5 |
| Porto | 2022–23 | Primeira Liga | 27 | 5 | — | | 6 | 2 | 4 | 0 | 7 | 0 | 0 | 0 | 44 | 7 |
| Porto | 2023–24 | Primeira Liga | 1 | 0 | — | | — | | — | | — | | 1 | 0 | 2 | 0 |
| Porto | Total | | 183 | 19 | — | | 33 | 8 | 13 | 0 | 51 | 4 | 3 | 0 | 283 | 31 |
| Vitória SC (loan) | 2014–15 | Primeira Liga | 10 | 1 | — | | 0 | 0 | 1 | 0 | — | | — | | 11 | 1 |
| Vitória SC (loan) | 2015–16 | Primeira Liga | 25 | 6 | — | | 1 | 0 | 0 | 0 | 1 (Note: Appearance in UEFA Europa League) | 0 | — | | 27 | 6 |
| Vitória SC (loan) | Total | | 35 | 7 | — | | 1 | 0 | 1 | 0 | 1 | 0 | — | | 38 | 7 |
| Vitória SC B (loan) | 2015–16 | Segunda Liga | 2 | 0 | — | | — | | — | | — | | — | | 2 | 0 |
| Al-Nassr | 2023–24 | Saudi Pro League | 29 | 10 | — | | 5 | 0 | — | | 9 (Note: Appearances in AFC Champions League) | 1 | 1 (Note: Appearance(s) in Saudi Super Cup) | 0 | 44 | 11 |
| Al-Nassr | 2024–25 | Saudi Pro League | 28 | 1 | — | | 2 | 0 | — | | 8 | 0 | 2 | 0 | 40 | 1 |
| Al-Nassr | Total | | 57 | 11 | — | | 7 | 0 | — | | 17 | 1 | 3 | 0 | 84 | 12 |
| Al-Qadsiah | 2025–26 | Saudi Pro League | 15 | 0 | — | | 3 | 0 | — | | — | | — | | 18 | 0 |
| Al-Qadsiah | 2026–27 | Saudi Pro League | 1 | 0 | — | | 1 | 0 | — | | 0 | 0 | 0 | 0 | 2 | 0 |
| Al-Qadsiah | Total | | 16 | 0 | — | | 4 | 0 | — | | 0 | 0 | 0 | 0 | 20 | 0 |
| Career total | | | 338 | 45 | 18 | 0 | 51 | 9 | 14 | 0 | 69 | 5 | 6 | 0 | 496 | 59 |

=== International ===
As of match played 18 November 2024

Appearances and goals by national team and year
| National team | Year | Apps | Goals |
|---|---|---|---|
| Portugal | 2021 | 2 | 1 |
| Portugal | 2022 | 9 | 1 |
| Portugal | 2023 | 8 | 1 |
| Portugal | 2024 | 3 | 0 |
| Total | | 22 | 3 |

As of match played 18 November 2024
Portugal score listed first, score column indicates score after each Otávio goal.

List of international goals scored by Otávio
| No. | Date | Venue | Cap | Opponent | Score | Result | Competition |
|---|---|---|---|---|---|---|---|
| 1 | 4 September 2021 | Nagyerdei Stadion, Debrecen, Hungary | 1 | Qatar | 2–0 | 3–1 | Friendly |
| 2 | 24 March 2022 | Estádio do Dragão, Porto, Portugal | 3 | Turkey | 1–0 | 3–1 | 2022 FIFA World Cup qualification |
| 3 | 26 March 2023 | Stade de Luxembourg, Luxembourg City, Luxembourg | 12 | Luxembourg | 5–0 | 6–0 | UEFA Euro 2024 qualifying |

== Honours ==
Internacional

- Campeonato Gaúcho: 2013, 2014

Porto

- Primeira Liga: 2017–18, 2019–20, 2021–22
- Taça de Portugal: 2019–20, 2021–22, 2022–23
- Taça da Liga: 2022–23
- Supertaça Cândido de Oliveira: 2018, 2020

Individual

- LPFP Primeira Liga Player of the Year: 2022–23
- Primeira Liga Team of the Year: 2019–20, 2021–22, 2022–23
- SJPF Player of the Month: July 2020
