= CTFD PortoGaia =

Football training complex of FC Porto

CTFD Jorge Costa
- Interactive map of CTFD Jorge Costa
- Full name: Centro de Treinos e Formação Desportiva Jorge Costa
- Location: Olival, Vila Nova de Gaia, Portugal
- Coordinates: 41.065921°N 8.51707°W
- Owner: Vila Nova de Gaia Municipality
- Operator: FC Porto
- Capacity: 3,800
- Type: Training ground
- Surface: Natural grass, artificial turf

Construction
- Opened: 5 August 2002
- Architect: Alcino Soutinho

Tenant
- FC Porto

The CTFD PortoGaia (Centro de Treinos e Formação Desportiva Jorge Costa; English: Centro de Treinos e Formação Desportiva Jorge Costa) is a football training complex located in Olival, Vila Nova de Gaia, Portugal, that is used by the senior, reserve and youth teams of FC Porto.

Designed by Portuguese architect Alcino Soutinho and inaugurated in the summer of 2002, the complex is property of the Vila Nova de Gaia municipality, with the official name CTFD Olival/Crestuma. It had a construction cost of €16 million but was leased to FC Porto for €500 a month for a period of 50 years.

== Facilities ==
- One grass pitch with a 3,800-capacity grandstand and floodlighting named Estádio Luís Filipe Menezes.
- Three grass pitches for training purposes.
- One artificial turf pitch with floodlighting.
- One artificial turf mini-pitch (40×30 metres).
- Three support buildings:
  - Entry building (reception, cafeteria, press center and auditorium).
  - Youth teams (three team dressing rooms, one referee dressing room, one coach dressing room, medical department, and hydrotherapy room).
  - Senior team (two team dressing rooms, two coach dressing rooms, two medical support rooms, hydrotherapy and massage room, gym).
