= 2024 Taça de Portugal final =

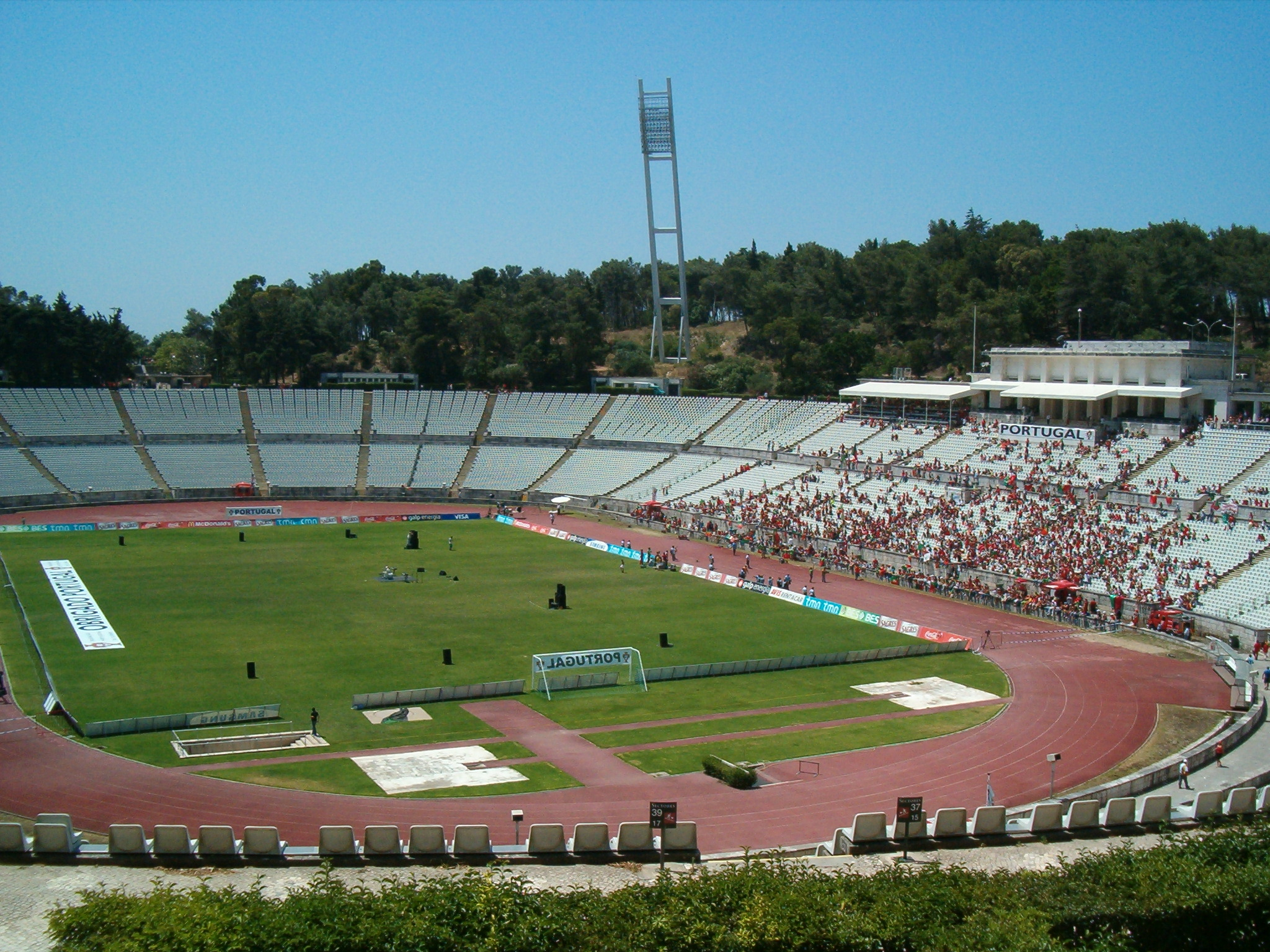
- Estádio Nacional
- Event: 2023–24 Taça de Portugal
Sporting CP	Porto
1	2
- Date: 26 May 2024
- Venue: Estádio Nacional, Oeiras
- Man of the Match: Evanilson
- Fair Player of the Match: Gonçalo Inácio
- Referee: Fábio Veríssimo
- Attendance: 37,593

The 2024 Taça de Portugal final was the last match of the 2023–24 Taça de Portugal, which decided the winner of the 84th season of the Taça de Portugal, the premier knockout cup competition in Portuguese football. It was played on 26 May 2024 at the Estádio Nacional in Oeiras, between Primeira Liga sides Sporting CP and Porto.

Sporting played their thirtieth final in the competition, having last appeared in the 2019 final when they defeated Porto on penalties for their seventeenth title. Porto played the decisive match for the 34th time and third consecutive season, having beaten Braga in the previous season's final to lift the trophy for the 19th time. Sporting and Porto have previously played each other in the Taça de Portugal final on five occasions, with Porto winning three and Sporting winning their most recent meeting in 2019. Porto went on to successfully defend their title and secure a third consecutive title by defeating Sporting 2–1, after extra time.

== Route to the final ==
Sporting		Round	Porto
Opponent	Result	2023–24 Taça de Portugal	Opponent	Result
CD Olivais e Moscavide	3–1 (A)	Third round	Vilar de Perdizes	2–0 (A)
Dumiense	8–0 (H)	Fourth round	Montalegre	4–0 (H)
Tondela	4–0 (H)	Fifth round	Estoril	4–0 (A)
União de Leiria	3–0 (A)	Quarter-finals	Santa Clara	2–1 (A)
Benfica	2–1 (H)	Semi-finals	Vitória de Guimarães	1–0 (A)
Benfica	2–2 (A)	Semi-finals	Vitória de Guimarães	3–1 (H)

Note: H = home fixture, A = away fixture

== Match ==
=== Details ===
26 May 2024
17:15 WEST (UTC+01:00)

Porto	2–1 (a.e.t.)	Sporting CP
Evanilson 25'; Taremi 100' (pen.)	Report	St. Juste 20'

Estádio Nacional, Oeiras
Attendance: 37,593
Referee: Fábio Veríssimo

Porto	Sporting

GK	99	(Portugal) Diogo Costa
RB	23	(Portugal) João Mário	(yellow card) 37'	(substituted off) 46'
CB	97	(Portugal) Zé Pedro	(yellow card) 90+1'
CB	31	(Brazil) Otávio	(yellow card) 110'
LB	18	(Brazil) Wendell
CM	22	(Argentina) Alan Varela (c)	(yellow card) 66'	(substituted off) 85'
CM	16	(Spain) Nico González	(substituted off) 85'
RW	10	(Portugal) Francisco Conceição	(substituted off) 119'
AM	11	(Brazil) Pepê	(substituted off) 113'
LW	13	(Brazil) Galeno
CF	30	(Brazil) Evanilson	(yellow card) 104'	(substituted off) 104'
Substitutes:
GK	14	(Portugal) Cláudio Ramos
DF	52	(Portugal) Martim Fernandes	(substituted on) 113'
DF	2	(Portugal) Fábio Cardoso
CM	16	(Serbia) Marko Grujić	(substituted on) 85'
MF	6	(Canada) Stephen Eustáquio	(substituted on) 85'
MF	6	(Portugal) Romário Baró	(substituted on) 104'
FW	70	(Portugal) Gonçalo Borges	(substituted on) 119'
FW	9	(Iran) Mehdi Taremi	(substituted on) 46'
FW	19	(England) Danny Namaso
Manager:
(Portugal) Sérgio Conceição

GK	51	(Portugal) Diogo Pinto
CB	3	(Netherlands) Jerry St. Juste	(red card) 30'
CB	4	(Uruguay) Sebastián Coates (c)		(substituted off) 103'
CB	25	(Portugal) Gonçalo Inácio
RM	11	(Portugal) Nuno Santos	(yellow card) 30'	(substituted off) 83'
CM	42	(Denmark) Morten Hjulmand		(yellow card) 106'
CM	5	(Japan) Hidemasa Morita	(substituted off) 35'
LM	20	(Mozambique) Geny Catamo	(substituted off) 71'
AM	17	(Portugal) Francisco Trincão		(substituted off) 71'
AM	8	(Portugal) Pedro Gonçalves		(substituted off) 90+1'
CF	9	(Sweden) Viktor Gyökeres	(yellow card) 39'
Substitutes:
GK	99	(Portugal) Francisco Silva
DF	47	(Portugal) Ricardo Esgaio	(substituted on) 83'
DF	13	(Portugal) Luís Neto	(yellow card) 81'
DF	26	(Ivory Coast) Ousmane Diomande	(substituted on) 71'
DF	35	(Portugal) Eduardo Quaresma	(substituted on) 35'
MF	23	(Portugal) Daniel Bragança	(substituted on) 71'	(yellow card) 80'
MF	80	(France) Koba Koindredi	(substituted on) 90+1'
FW	10	(England) Marcus Edwards
FW	20	(Portugal) Paulinho	(substituted on) 103'	(yellow card) 109'
Manager:
(Portugal) Ruben Amorim

Man of the Match:
Evanilson
Fair Player of the Match:
Gonçalo Inácio

Assistant referees:
Pedro Martins
Hugo Marques
Fourth official:
André Narciso
Video assistant referee:
João Pinheiro
Assistant video assistant referees:
Fábio Melo
Luciano Maia

Match rules

- 90 minutes
- 30 minutes of extra time if necessary
- Penalty shoot-out if scores still level
- Seven named substitutes
- Maximum of five substitutions, with a sixth allowed in extra time (Note: Each team was given only three opportunities to make substitutions, with a fourth opportunity in extra time, excluding substitutions made at half-time, before the start of extra time and at half-time in extra time.)

== See also ==
- FC Porto–Sporting CP rivalry
- 2023–24 FC Porto season
- 2023–24 Sporting CP season
- 2024 Taça da Liga final
