= 2023–24 Sporting CP season =

Sporting CP
2023–24 season
- President: Frederico Varandas
- Head coach: Ruben Amorim
- Stadium: Estádio José Alvalade
- Primeira Liga: 1st
- Taça de Portugal: Runners-up
- Taça da Liga: Semi-finals
- UEFA Europa League: Round of 16
- Top goalscorer: League: Viktor Gyökeres (29); All: Viktor Gyökeres (43)
- Average home league attendance: 40,102
Home colours	Away colours	Third colours

The 2023–24 season was the 118th season in the history of Sporting CP and their 90th consecutive season in the top flight of Portuguese football. In addition to the domestic league, Sporting participated in this season's editions of the Taça de Portugal, Taça da Liga and UEFA Europa League.

On 5 May, Sporting were confirmed as league champions with two matches to spare following Benfica's 2–0 away defeat to Famalicão, clinching the club's 20th league title and first since the 2020–21 season. In this league season, Sporting set several club records: Most points in a season (90 points), most wins in a season (29 wins) and for the first time in the club's history, Sporting finished with a 100% win record for all home matches (17 wins out of 17).

== Players ==
=== First-team squad ===
As of 1 February 2024

Note: Flags indicate national team as defined under FIFA eligibility rules; some limited exceptions apply. Players may hold more than one non-FIFA nationality.

No.	Pos.	Nation	Player
1	GK	ESP	Antonio Adán (3rd captain)
2	DF	BRA	Matheus Reis
3	DF	NED	Jerry St. Juste
4	DF	URU	Sebastián Coates (captain)
5	MF	JPN	Hidemasa Morita
8	MF	POR	Pedro Gonçalves
9	FW	SWE	Viktor Gyökeres
10	FW	ENG	Marcus Edwards
11	FW	POR	Nuno Santos
12	GK	URU	Franco Israel
13	DF	POR	Luís Neto (vice-captain)
17	FW	POR	Francisco Trincão

No.	Pos.	Nation	Player
20	FW	POR	Paulinho
21	FW	MOZ	Geny Catamo
22	DF	ESP	Iván Fresneda
23	MF	POR	Daniel Bragança
25	DF	POR	Gonçalo Inácio (5th captain)
26	DF	CIV	Ousmane Diomande
42	MF	DEN	Morten Hjulmand
45	DF	BRA	Rafael Pontelo
47	DF	POR	Ricardo Esgaio (4th captain)
72	DF	POR	Eduardo Quaresma
80	MF	FRA	Koba Koindredi

=== Other players under contract ===
Note: Flags indicate national team as defined under FIFA eligibility rules; some limited exceptions apply. Players may hold more than one non-FIFA nationality.

No.	Pos.	Nation	Player
—	FW	POR	Rafael Camacho

== Transfers ==
=== In ===
No.	Pos	Player	Transferred from	Fee	Date	Source
Summer transfers
9	FW	(Sweden) Viktor Gyökeres	(England) Coventry City	€21,000,000	1 July 2023	
17	FW	(Portugal) Francisco Trincão	(Spain) Barcelona	€7,000,000	1 July 2023	
22	DF	(Spain) Iván Fresneda	(Spain) Valladolid	€9,000,000	30 August 2023	
42	MF	(Denmark) Morten Hjulmand	(Italy) Lecce	€18,000,000	13 August 2023	
Winter transfers
45	DF	(Brazil) Rafael Pontelo	(Portugal) Leixões	€700,000	2 January 2024	
80	MF	(France) Koba Koindredi	(Portugal) Estoril	€4,250,000	31 January 2024	
Disclosed total
€59,950,000

=== Out ===
No.	Pos	Player	Transferred to	Fee	Date	Source
Summer transfers
—	MF	(Ivory Coast) Idrissa Doumbia	(Qatar) Al-Ahli	Free transfer (Note: Sporting will receive a 50% of any future sale.)	26 June 2023	
22	GK	(Portugal) André Paulo	(Portugal) Mafra	End of contract	3 July 2023	
24	DF	(Spain) Pedro Porro	(England) Tottenham Hotspur	€40,000,000	1 July 2023	
33	FW	(Brazil) Arthur Gomes	(Brazil) Cruzeiro	€3,000,000	1 July 2023	
—	FW	(Portugal) Tiago Tomás	(Germany) VfL Wolfsburg	€8,000,000	5 July 2023	
15	MF	(Uruguay) Manuel Ugarte	(France) Paris Saint-Germain	€60,000,000	7 July 2023	
19	DF	(Spain) Héctor Bellerín	(Spain) Real Betis	End of contract	11 July 2023	
16	FW	(Portugal) Rochinha	(Qatar) Al-Markhiya	Loan	19 July 2023	
—	DF	(Portugal) Rúben Vinagre	(England) Hull City	Loan	20 July 2023	
—	DF	(Portugal) Tiago Ilori	Free agent	Contract termination	2 August 2023	
63	DF	(Spain) José Marsà	(Spain) Andorra	Free transfer (Note: Sporting reserves a right to first refusal and 50% of any future sale.)	3 August 2023	
6	MF	(Greece) Sotiris Alexandropoulos	(Greece) Olympiacos	Loan	3 August 2023	
79	FW	(Portugal) Youssef Chermiti	(England) Everton	€12,500,000	13 August 2023	
77	FW	(Cape Verde) Jovane Cabral	(Italy) Salernitana	Loan	24 August 2023	
95	MF	(Portugal) Renato Veiga (Note: Highest transfer fee at the time for a Sporting player with no official games for the first team.)	(Switzerland) Basel	€4,600,000 (Note: Sporting will receive a 10% for any future sale.)	28 August 2023	
82	MF	(Portugal) Mateus Fernandes	(Portugal) Estoril	Loan	29 August 2023	
18	FW	(Ghana) Abdul Fatawu	(England) Leicester City	Loan	31 August 2023	
32	MF	(Argentina) Mateo Tanlongo	(Denmark) Copenhagen	Loan	1 September 2023	
71	DF	(Portugal) Flávio Nazinho	(Belgium) Cercle Brugge	Loan	6 September 2023	
Winter transfers
—	MF	(Argentina) Mateo Tanlongo	(Portugal) Rio Ave	Loan	11 January 2024	
41	GK	(Brazil) Diego Callai	(Portugal) Feirense	Loan	11 January 2024	
—	DF	(Portugal) Rúben Vinagre	(Italy) Hellas Verona	Loan	26 January 2024	
90	FW	(Portugal) Afonso Moreira	(Portugal) Gil Vicente	Loan	29 January 2024	
14	MF	(Portugal) Dário Essugo	(Portugal) Chaves	Loan	31 January 2024	
91	FW	(Portugal) Rodrigo Ribeiro	(England) Nottingham Forest	Loan	31 January 2024	
—	FW	(Cape Verde) Jovane Cabral	(Greece) Olympiacos	Loan	31 January 2024	
—	FW	(Portugal) Rochinha	(Turkey) Kasımpaşa	Contract termination	31 January 2024	
Disclosed total
€128,100,000

== Pre-season friendlies ==
14 July 2023 Friendly	Sporting CP (Portugal)	4–1	(Portugal) Estrela da Amadora	Lisbon, Portugal
12:00 WEST (UTC+1)	Chermiti,, Cabral	Report	Tavares
Note: The match featured two 35-minute halves.

14 July 2023 Friendly	Sporting CP (Portugal)	3–0	(Portugal) Marítimo	Lisbon, Portugal
19:00 WEST (UTC+1)	Trincão, Catamo	Report
Note: The match featured two 35-minute halves.

19 July 2023 Friendly	Sporting CP (Portugal)	2–1	(Portugal) Farense	Lisbon, Portugal
13:00 WEST (UTC+1)	João Muniz; Catamo	Report	Diogo Paulo

19 July 2023 Friendly	Sporting CP (Portugal)	1–1	(Belgium) Genk	Loulé, Portugal
22:30 WEST (UTC+1)	Trincão 10'	Report	Fadera 25'	Stadium: Estádio Algarve

25 July 2023 Friendly	Sporting CP (Portugal)	1–1	(Portugal) Portimonense	Lagos, Portugal
13:00 WEST (UTC+1)	Catamo	Report	Davis	Stadium: Estádio Municipal

25 July 2023 Friendly	Sporting CP (Portugal)	3–0	(Spain) Real Sociedad	Loulé, Portugal
22:30 WEST (UTC+1)	Gyökeres 19'; Esgaio 28'; Gonçalves 56'; Barroso (red card) 85'	Report		Stadium: Estádio Algarve

30 July 2023 Troféu Cinco Violinos	Sporting CP (Portugal)	3–0	(Spain) Villarreal	Lisbon, Portugal
20:00 WEST (UTC+1)	Matheus Reis (yellow card) 26'; Edwards 44'; Gonçalves 71'; Paulinho 75'	Report	Parejo (yellow card) 8'; Cuenca (yellow card) 21'; Gabbia (yellow card) 78'	Stadium: Estádio José Alvalade; Referee: Halim Aqa Shirzad (Afghanistan)

== Competitions ==
=== Overall record ===
Competition	First match	Last match	Starting round	Final position	Record							
Competition	First match	Last match	Starting round	Final position	Pld	W	D	L	GF	GA	GD	Win %
Primeira Liga	12 August 2023	18 May 2024	Matchday 1	Winners	34	29	3	2	96	29	+67	85.29
Taça de Portugal	21 October 2023	26 May 2024	Third round	Runners-up	7	5	1	1	23	6	+17	71.43
Taça da Liga	2 November 2023	23 January 2024	Group stage	Semi-finals	3	2	0	1	6	4	+2	66.67
UEFA Europa League	21 September 2023	14 March 2024	Group stage	Round of 16	10	4	4	2	16	11	+5	40.00
Total					54	40	8	6	141	50	+91	74.07

Source: Soccerway

=== Primeira Liga ===
==== League table ====
Pos	Team	Pld	W	D	L	GF	GA	GD	Pts	Qualification or relegation
1	Sporting CP (C)	34	29	3	2	96	29	+67	90	Qualification for the Champions League league phase (Note: Since Atalanta, the winners of the 2023–24 UEFA Europa League, qualified for the Champions League via league position, Benfica was promoted from the Champions League third qualifying round to the league phase, as the team with the highest coefficient out of all the teams in Champions League qualifying.)
2	Benfica	34	25	5	4	77	28	+49	80	Qualification for the Champions League league phase
3	Porto	34	22	6	6	63	27	+36	72	Qualification for the Europa League league phase (Note: Porto qualified for the Europa League league phase by winning the 2023–24 Taça de Portugal.)
4	Braga	34	21	5	8	71	50	+21	68	Qualification for the Europa League second qualifying round (Note: Since the 2023–24 Taça de Portugal winners, Porto, finished in top three, the spot given to the third-placed team (Europa League second qualifying round) was passed to the fourth-placed team, and the spot given to the fourth-placed team (Conference League second qualifying round) was passed to the fifth-placed team.)
5	Vitória de Guimarães	34	19	6	9	52	38	+14	63	Qualification for the Conference League second qualifying round

Source: Liga Portugal
Rules for classification: 1) Points; 2) Head-to-head points; 3) Head-to-head goal difference; 4) Head-to-head away goals scored; 5) Goal difference; 6) Matches won; 7) Goals scored; 8) Play-off.
(C) Champions

==== Results summary ====
Overall								Home						Away					
Pld	W	D	L	GF	GA	GD	Pts	W	D	L	GF	GA	GD	W	D	L	GF	GA	GD
34	29	3	2	96	29	+67	90	17	0	0	57	11	+46	12	3	2	39	18	+21

Source: Liga Portugal

==== Results by round ====
Round	1	2	3	4	5	6	7	8	9	10	11	12	13	14	15	16	17	18	19	20	21	22	23	24	25	26	27	28	29	30	31	32	33	34
Ground	H	A	H	A	H	H	A	H	A	H	A	H	A	H	A	H	A	A	H	A	H	A	A	H	A	H	A	H	A	H	A	H	A	H
Result	W	W	W	D	W	W	W	W	W	W	L	W	L	W	W	W	W	W	W	W	W	W	D	W	W	W	W	W	W	W	D	W	W	W
Position	6	2	3	3	2	1	1	1	1	1	2	1	1	1	1	1	1	1	1	1	1	1	1	1	1	1	1	1	1	1	1	1	1	1

Source: Liga Portugal
A = Away; H = Home; W = Win; D = Draw; L = Loss; P = Postponed

==== Matches ====
12 August 2023 1	Sporting CP	3–2	Vizela	Lisbon
20:30 WEST (UTC+01:00)	Gyökeres 14', 15'; Paulinho 90+8'	Report	Essende 75'; Moreira 77'	Stadium: Estádio José Alvalade; Attendance: 37,152; Referee: Fábio Melo

18 August 2023 2	Casa Pia	1–2	Sporting CP	Rio Maior
20:15 WEST (UTC+01:00)	Clayton 58'	Report	Paulinho 3', 61'	Stadium: Estádio Municipal de Rio Maior; Attendance: 6,981; Referee: Nuno Almeida

27 August 2023 3	Sporting CP	1–0	Famalicão	Lisbon
20:30 WEST (UTC+01:00)	Paulinho 52'	Report		Stadium: Estádio José Alvalade; Attendance: 40,287; Referee: André Narciso

3 September 2023 4	Braga	1–1	Sporting CP	Braga
20:30 WEST (UTC+01:00)	Djaló 78'	Report	Gonçalves 25'	Stadium: Estádio Municipal de Braga; Attendance: 22,781; Referee: Luís Godinho

17 September 2023 5	Sporting CP	3–0	Moreirense	Lisbon
20:30 WEST (UTC+01:00)	Hjulmand 54'; Gyökeres 61'; Diomande 90+6'	Report		Stadium: Estádio José Alvalade; Attendance: 36,815; Referee: Manuel Oliveira

25 September 2023 6	Sporting CP	2–0	Rio Ave	Lisbon
20:15 WEST (UTC+01:00)	Paulinho 10'; Edwards 26'	Report		Stadium: Estádio José Alvalade; Attendance: 34,355; Referee: Cláudio Pereira

30 September 2023 7	Farense	2–3	Sporting CP	Faro
20:30 WEST (UTC+01:00)	Oliveira 37', 55'	Report	Gyökeres 21' (pen.), 90' (pen.); Gonçalves 35'	Stadium: Estádio de São Luís; Attendance: 6,020; Referee: Luís Godinho

8 October 2023 8	Sporting CP	2–1	Arouca	Lisbon
20:30 WEST (UTC+01:00)	Gyökeres 31'; Morita 68'	Report	Mújica 52'	Stadium: Estádio José Alvalade; Attendance: 36,688; Referee: António Nobre

30 October 2023 9	Boavista	0–2	Sporting CP	Porto
20:15 WET (UTC±00:00)		Report	Catamo 37'; Gonçalves 85'	Stadium: Estádio do Bessa; Attendance: 12,608; Referee: Nuno Almeida

5 November 2023 10	Sporting CP	3–2	Estrela da Amadora	Lisbon
20:30 WET (UTC±00:00)	Bragança 33'; Edwards 71'; Paulinho 79'	Report	Jabá 50' (pen.); Kikas 55'	Stadium: Estádio José Alvalade; Attendance: 38,408; Referee: André Narciso

12 November 2023 11	Benfica	2–1	Sporting CP	Lisbon
20:30 WET (UTC±00:00)	Neves 90+4'; Tengstedt 90+7'	Report	Gyökeres 45'	Stadium: Estádio da Luz; Attendance: 62,166; Referee: Artur Soares Dias

4 December 2023 12	Sporting CP	3–1	Gil Vicente	Lisbon
20:15 WET (UTC±00:00)	Tiba 43' (o.g.); Gyökeres 52', 56'	Report	Fernandes 34'	Stadium: Estádio José Alvalade; Attendance: 33,712; Referee: Cláudio Pereira

9 December 2023 13	Vitória de Guimarães	3–2	Sporting CP	Guimarães
18:00 WET (UTC±00:00)	Tiago Silva 45+7' (pen.); André Silva 73'; Dani Silva 80'	Report	Inácio 41'; Santos 77'	Stadium: Estádio D. Afonso Henriques; Attendance: 20,357; Referee: João Pinheiro

18 December 2023 14	Sporting CP	2–0	Porto	Lisbon
20:15 WET (UTC±00:00)	Gyökeres 11'; Gonçalves 60'	Report		Stadium: Estádio José Alvalade; Attendance: 44,385; Referee: Nuno Almeida

30 December 2023 15	Portimonense	1–2	Sporting CP	Portimão
20:30 WET (UTC±00:00)	Relvas 69'	Report	Gyökeres 11'; Paulinho 79'	Stadium: Estádio Municipal de Portimão; Attendance: 4,574; Referee: Manuel Oliveira

5 January 2024 16	Sporting CP	5–1	Estoril	Lisbon
18:45 WET (UTC±00:00)	Edwards 21', 45+2'; Álvaro 51' (o.g.); Gonçalves 60'; Trincão 78'	Report	Cassiano 82'	Stadium: Estádio José Alvalade; Attendance: 37,483; Referee: Cláudio Pereira

13 January 2024 17	Chaves	0–3	Sporting CP	Chaves
18:00 WET (UTC±00:00)		Report	Paulinho 44'; Trincão 52'; Gonçalves 56'	Stadium: Estádio Municipal de Chaves; Attendance: 5,690; Referee: Luís Godinho

18 January 2024 18	Vizela	2–5	Sporting CP	Vizela
20:45 WET (UTC±00:00)	Soro 13'; Essende 63'	Report	Gyökeres 45+8', 86'; Trincão 46'; Paulinho 57'; Coates 72'	Stadium: Estádio do FC Vizela; Attendance: 4,386; Referee: André Narciso

29 January 2024 19	Sporting CP	8–0	Casa Pia	Lisbon
20:45 WET (UTC±00:00)	Coates 14', 81'; Gyökeres 23', 32' (pen.); Gonçalves 25'; Trincão 43', 90+4'; Catamo 64'	Report		Stadium: Estádio José Alvalade; Attendance: 32,869; Referee: Hélder Carvalho

11 February 2024 21	Sporting CP	5–0	Braga	Lisbon
18:00 WET (UTC±00:00)	Trincão 8'; Quaresma 18'; Gyökeres 71'; Bragança 73'; Santos 85'	Report		Stadium: Estádio José Alvalade; Attendance: 39,851; Referee: António Nobre

19 February 2024 22	Moreirense	0–2	Sporting CP	Moreira de Cónegos
20:15 WET (UTC±00:00)		Report	Morita 3'; Gonçalves 23'	Stadium: Parque Moreira de Cóngeos; Attendance: 5,163; Referee: Fábio Veríssimo

25 February 2024 23	Rio Ave	3–3	Sporting CP	Vila do Conde
20:30 WET (UTC±00:00)	Embaló 3'; Yakubu 45+4' (pen.), 67' (pen.)	Report	Hjulmand 9'; Gyökeres 44'; Coates 73'	Stadium: Estádio dos Arcos; Attendance: 4,406; Referee: André Narciso

3 March 2024 24	Sporting CP	3–2	Farense	Lisbon
18:00 WET (UTC±00:00)	Bragança 11'; Gyökeres 29'; Gonçalves 53'	Report	Belloumi 32'; Zé Luís 50'	Stadium: Estádio José Alvalade; Attendance: 39,063; Referee: Cláudio Pereira

10 March 2024 25	Arouca	0–3	Sporting CP	Arouca
18:00 WET (UTC±00:00)		Report	Gyökeres 19'; Catamo 90+1'; Hjulmand 90+6'	Stadium: Estádio Municipal de Arouca; Attendance: 4,061; Referee: Nuno Almeida

17 March 2024 26	Sporting CP	6–1	Boavista	Lisbon
20:30 WET (UTC±00:00)	Gyökeres 45', 68', 79' (pen.); Paulinho 54', 90+5'; Santos 88'	Report	Makouta 3'	Stadium: Estádio José Alvalade; Attendance: 38,260; Referee: António Nobre

29 March 2024 27	Estrela da Amadora	1–2	Sporting CP	Amadora
20:30 WET (UTC±00:00)	Bucca 16'	Report	Paulinho 23'; Santos 40'	Stadium: Estádio José Gomes; Attendance: 6,764; Referee: Fábio Veríssimo

6 April 2024 28	Sporting CP	2–1	Benfica	Lisbon
20:30 WEST (UTC+01:00)	Catamo 1', 90+1'	Report	Bah 45+3'	Stadium: Estádio José Alvalade; Attendance: 48,113; Referee: Artur Soares Dias

12 April 2024 29	Gil Vicente	0–4	Sporting CP	Barcelos
20:15 WEST (UTC+01:00)		Report	Trincão 7', 31'; Diomande 11'; Andrew 38' (o.g.)	Stadium: Estádio Cidade de Barcelos; Attendance: 11,121; Referee: Manuel Oliveira

16 April 2024 20	Famalicão	0–1	Sporting CP	Vila Nova de Famalicão
20:15 WEST (UTC+01:00)		Report	Gonçalves 19'	Stadium: Estádio Municipal 22 de Junho; Attendance: 4,944; Referee: Fábio Veríssimo

21 April 2024 30	Sporting CP	3–0	Vitória de Guimarães	Lisbon
20:30 WEST (UTC+01:00)	Gonçalves 30'; Gyökeres 45+3', 49'	Report		Stadium: Estádio José Alvalade; Attendance: 46,101; Referee: Cláudio Pereira

28 April 2024 31	Porto	2–2	Sporting CP	Porto
20:30 WEST (UTC+01:00)	Evanilson 7'; Pepê 40'	Report	Gyökeres 87', 88'	Stadium: Estádio do Dragão; Attendance: 45,230; Referee: Nuno Almeida

4 May 2024 32	Sporting CP	3–0	Portimonense	Lisbon
18:00 WEST (UTC+01:00)	Paulinho 13'; Trincão 70'; Gyökeres 90+2'	Report		Stadium: Estádio José Alvalade; Attendance: 49,557; Referee: Iancu Vasilica

11 May 2024 33	Estoril	0–1	Sporting CP	Estoril
18:00 WEST (UTC+01:00)		Report	Paulinho 81'	Stadium: Estádio António Coimbra da Mota; Attendance: 5,018; Referee: João Gonçalves

18 May 2024 34	Sporting CP	3–0	Chaves	Lisbon
18:00 WEST (UTC+01:00)	Gyökeres 23' (pen.), 37'; Paulinho 55'	Report		Stadium: Estádio José Alvalade; Attendance: 48,628; Referee: Manuel Oliveira

=== Taça de Portugal ===
21 October 2023 Third round	Olivais e Moscavide	1–3	Sporting CP	Amadora
20:45 WEST (UTC+01:00)	Simões 8' (pen.)	Report	Edwards 44' (pen.); Catano 53'; Bragança 90+4'	Stadium: Estádio José Gomes; Referee: Hélder Carvalho

25 November 2023 Fourth round	Sporting CP	8–0	Dumiense	Lisbon
18:00 WET (UTC±00:00)	Neto 8'; Paulinho 28', 58', 71'; Trincão 46'; Coates 53'; Santos 75' (pen.); Gyökeres 83'	Report		Stadium: Estádio José Alvalade; Referee: Bruno Costa

9 January 2024 Fifth round	Sporting CP	4–0	Tondela	Lisbon
18:45 WET (UTC±00:00)	Gonçalves 11', 16'; Gyökeres 37', 46'			Stadium: Estádio José Alvalade; Referee: Hélder Malheiro

7 February 2024 Quarter-finals	União de Leiria	0–3	Sporting CP	Leiria
20:45 WET (UTC±00:00)		Report	Gyökeres 32', 74'; Gonçalves 37'	Stadium: Estádio Dr. Magalhães Pessoa; Attendance: 20,310; Referee: Tiago Martins

29 February 2024 Semi-finals; First leg	Sporting CP	2–1	Benfica	Lisbon
20:45 WET (UTC±00:00)	Gonçalves 9'; Gyökeres 54'	Report	Aursnes 68'	Stadium: Estádio José Alvalade; Attendance: 45,393; Referee: Fábio Veríssimo

2 April 2024 Semi-finals; Second leg	Benfica	2–2 (3–4 agg.)	Sporting CP	Lisbon
20:45 WEST (UTC+1)	Otamendi 52'; R. Silva 64'	Report	Hjulmand 47'; Paulinho 55'	Stadium: Estádio da Luz; Attendance: 59,113; Referee: João Pinheiro

26 May 2024 Final	Porto	2–1 (a.e.t.)	Sporting CP	Oeiras
17:15 WEST (UTC+1)	Evanilson 25'; Taremi 100' (pen.)	Report	St. Juste 20'	Stadium: Estádio Nacional; Attendance: 37,593; Referee: Fábio Veríssimo

=== Taça da Liga ===
==== Third round ====
Pos	Team	Pld	W	D	L	GF	GA	GD	Pts	Qualification	SPO	FAR	TON
1	Sporting CP	2	2	0	0	6	3	+3	6	Advance to knockout phase	—	4–2	—
2	Farense	2	1	0	1	3	4	−1	3		—	—	1–0
3	Tondela	2	0	0	2	1	3	−2	0		1–2	—	—

Source: Liga Portugal
Rules for classification: Tiebreakers

2 November 2023 2	Sporting CP	4–2	Farense	Lisbon
20:15 WET (UTC±0)	Gyökeres 24', 28' (pen.), 63'; Santos 56'	Report	Mattheus 49'; Gonçalves 79'	Stadium: Estádio José Alvalade; Attendance: 22,801; Referee: Gustavo Correia

23 December 2023 3	Tondela	1–2	Sporting CP	Tondela
18:00 WET (UTC±0)	Tavares 76'	Report	Bragança 17'; Paulinho 32'	Stadium: Estádio João Cardoso; Attendance: 4,689; Referee: David Rafael Silva

==== Semi-finals ====
23 January 2024	Braga	1–0	Sporting CP	Leiria
19:45 WET (UTC±0)	Ruiz 65'	Report		Stadium: Estádio Dr. Magalhães Pessoa; Attendance: 18,504; Referee: Nuno Almeida

=== UEFA Europa League ===
==== Group stage ====
The draw for the group stage was held on 1 September 2023.

Pos	Team	Pld	W	D	L	GF	GA	GD	Pts	Qualification	ATA	SCP	STU	RAK
1	(Italy) Atalanta	6	4	2	0	12	4	+8	14	Advance to round of 16	—	1–1	1–0	2–0
2	(Portugal) Sporting CP	6	3	2	1	10	6	+4	11	Advance to knockout round play-offs	1–2	—	3–0	2–1
3	(Austria) Sturm Graz	6	1	1	4	4	9	−5	4 (Note: Tied on head-to-head results. Overall goal difference used as a tiebreaker.)	Transfer to Europa Conference League	2–2	1–2	—	0–1
4	(Poland) Raków Częstochowa	6	1	1	4	3	10	−7	4		0–4	1–1	0–1	—

Source: UEFA
Rules for classification: Group stage tiebreakers
Notes:

21 September 2023 1	Sturm Graz (Austria)	1–2	(Portugal) Sporting CP	Graz, Austria
21:00 CEST (UTC+2)	Bøving 58'	Report	Gyökeres 75'; Diomande 84'	Stadium: Liebenauer Stadium; Attendance: 13,517; Referee: Nikola Dabanović (Montenegro)

5 October 2023 2	Sporting CP (Portugal)	1–2	(Italy) Atalanta	Lisbon, Portugal
17:45 WEST (UTC+1)	Gyökeres 76' (pen.)	Report	Scalvini 33'; Ruggeri 43'	Stadium: Estádio José Alvalade; Attendance: 42,301; Referee: Alejandro Hernández (Spain)

26 October 2023 3	Raków Częstochowa (Poland)	1–1	(Portugal) Sporting CP	Sosnowiec, Poland
18:45 CEST (UTC+2)	Piasecki 79'	Report	Coates 14'	Stadium: Zagłębiowski Park Sportowy; Attendance: 10,518; Referee: Anastasios Papapetrou (Greece)

9 November 2023 4	Sporting CP (Portugal)	2–1	(Poland) Raków Częstochowa	Lisbon, Portugal
20:00 WET (UTC±0)	Gonçalves 14' (pen.), 52' (pen.)	Report		Stadium: Estádio José Alvalade; Attendance: 32,940; Referee: Enea Jorgji (Albania)

30 November 2023 5	Atalanta (Italy)	1–1	(Portugal) Sporting CP	Bergamo, Italy
18:45 CET (UTC+1)	Scamacca 23'	Report	Edwards 56'	Stadium: Stadio Atleti Azzurri d'Italia; Attendance: 14,865; Referee: Michael Oliver (England)

14 December 2023 6	Sporting CP (Portugal)	3–0	(Austria) Sturm Graz	Lisbon, Portugal
20:00 WET (UTC±0)	Gyökeres 39'; Inácio 60', 70'	Report		Stadium: Estádio José Alvalade; Attendance: 24,733; Referee: Willie Collum (Scotland)

==== Knockout phase ====
===== Knockout round play-offs =====
The draw for the knockout round play-offs was held on 18 December 2023.

15 February 2024 First leg	Young Boys (Switzerland)	1–3	(Portugal) Sporting CP	Bern, Switzerland
18:45 CET	Ugrinic 42'	Report	Amenda 31' (o.g.); Gyökeres 41' (pen.); Inácio 48'	Stadium: Stadion Wankdorf; Attendance: 31,500; Referee: Benoît Bastien (France)

22 February 2024 Second leg	Sporting CP (Portugal)	1–1 (4–1 agg.)	(Switzerland) Young Boys	Lisbon, Portugal
20:00 WET	Gyökeres 13'	Report	Ganvoula 84' (pen.)	Stadium: Estádio José Alvalade; Attendance: 29,393; Referee: Ivan Kružliak (Slovakia)

===== Round of 16 =====
The draw for the round of 16 was held on 23 February 2024.

6 March 2024 First leg	Sporting CP (Portugal)	1–1	(Italy) Atalanta	Lisbon, Portugal
17:45 WET	Paulinho 17'	Report	Scamacca 39'	Stadium: Estádio José Alvalade; Attendance: 28,528; Referee: Daniel Siebert (Germany)

14 March 2024 Second leg	Atalanta (Italy)	2–1 (3–2 agg.)	(Portugal) Sporting CP	Bergamo, Italy
21:00 CET	Lookman 46'; Scamacca 59'	Report	Gonçalves 33'	Stadium: Stadio Atleti Azzurri d'Italia; Attendance: 14,649; Referee: Sandro Schärer (Switzerland)

== Statistics ==
=== Appearances and goals ===
No.	Pos	Nat	Player	Total		Primeira Liga		Taça de Portugal		Taça da Liga		UEFA Europa League	
No.	Pos	Nat	Player	Apps	Goals	Apps	Goals	Apps	Goals	Apps	Goals	Apps	Goals
Goalkeepers
1	GK	(Spain) ESP	Antonio Adán	28	0	22	0	0	0	0	0	6	0
12	GK	(Uruguay) URU	Franco Israel	23	0	10	0	6	0	3	0	4	0
51	GK	(Portugal) POR	Diogo Pinto	3	0	2	0	1	0	0	0	0	0
99	GK	(Portugal) POR	Francisco Silva	1	0	0+1	0	0	0	0	0	0	0
Defenders
2	DF	(Brazil) BRA	Matheus Reis	47	0	15+13	0	4+2	0	2+1	0	9+1	0
3	DF	(Netherlands) NED	Jerry St. Juste	20	1	5+6	0	2+2	1	1	0	3+1	0
4	DF	(Uruguay) URU	Sebastián Coates	44	6	26+3	4	5+1	1	1+1	0	5+2	1
13	DF	(Portugal) POR	Luís Neto	15	0	2+5	0	3+1	0	1+1	0	1+1	0
22	DF	(Spain) ESP	Iván Fresneda	10	0	0+6	0	1	0	0	0	1+2	0
25	DF	(Portugal) POR	Gonçalo Inácio	49	4	28+4	1	3+2	0	3	0	8+1	3
26	DF	(Ivory Coast) CIV	Ousmane Diomande	38	3	25+1	2	2+1	0	1	0	7+1	1
43	DF	(Portugal) POR	João Muniz	0	0	0	0	0	0	0	0	0	0
45	DF	(Brazil) BRA	Rafael Pontelo	2	0	0+1	0	1	0	0	0	0	0
47	DF	(Portugal) POR	Ricardo Esgaio	47	0	19+9	0	3+4	0	3	0	7+2	0
72	DF	(Portugal) POR	Eduardo Quaresma	30	1	9+11	1	2+2	0	1+1	0	3+1	0
80	DF	(France) FRA	Koba Koindredi	8	0	0+4	0	0+1	0	0	0	1+2	0
Midfielders
5	MF	(Japan) JPN	Hidemasa Morita	40	2	24+5	2	2+2	0	0	0	4+3	0
8	MF	(Portugal) POR	Pedro Gonçalves	49	18	32	11	5	4	2+1	0	6+3	3
23	MF	(Portugal) POR	Daniel Bragança	46	5	10+18	3	4+2	1	2+1	1	5+4	0
42	MF	(Denmark) DEN	Morten Hjulmand	49	4	28+2	3	5+2	1	2	0	8+2	0
93	MF	(Portugal) POR	Miguel Menino	1	0	0+1	0	0	0	0	0	0	0
Forwards
9	FW	(Sweden) SWE	Viktor Gyökeres	50	43	32+1	29	5+1	6	2	3	8+1	5
10	FW	(England) ENG	Marcus Edwards	44	6	15+11	4	3+2	1	1+2	0	6+4	1
11	FW	(Portugal) POR	Nuno Santos	50	6	24+7	4	5+2	1	3	1	4+5	0
17	FW	(Portugal) POR	Francisco Trincão	48	10	18+13	9	6	1	3	0	7+1	0
20	FW	(Portugal) POR	Paulinho	47	21	11+20	15	4+2	4	2+1	1	5+2	1
21	FW	(Mozambique) MOZ	Geny Catamo	41	5	17+10	4	4+2	1	0+1	0	2+5	0
86	FW	(Portugal) POR	Rafael Nel	1	0	0	0	0	0	0	0	0+1	0
88	FW	(Portugal) POR	Tiago Ferreira	1	0	0	0	0	0	0	0	0+1	0
Players who transferred out during the season
14	MF	(Portugal) POR	Dário Essugo	10	0	0+4	0	1+2	0	0+2	0	0+1	0
41	GK	(Brazil) BRA	Diego Callai	0	0	0	0	0	0	0	0	0	0
90	FW	(Portugal) POR	Afonso Moreira	3	0	0+1	0	0+1	0	0+1	0	0	0
91	FW	(Portugal) POR	Rodrigo Ribeiro	0	0	0	0	0	0	0	0	0	0

- Source: Soccerway
