= 2022–23 Sporting CP season =

Sporting CP
2022–23 season
- President: Frederico Varandas
- Head coach: Ruben Amorim
- Stadium: Estádio José Alvalade
- Primeira Liga: 4th
- Taça de Portugal: Third round
- Taça da Liga: Runners-up
- UEFA Champions League: Group stage
- UEFA Europa League: Quarter-finals
- Top goalscorer: League: Pedro Gonçalves (15); All: Pedro Gonçalves (20)
Home colours	Away colours	Third colours

The 2022–23 season was the 117th season in the history of Sporting CP and their 89th consecutive season in the top flight of Portuguese football. In addition to the domestic league, they participated in this season's editions of the Taça de Portugal, Taça da Liga, UEFA Champions League and UEFA Europa League.

== Players ==
=== Current squad ===
As of 3 February 2023

Note: Flags indicate national team as defined under FIFA eligibility rules; some limited exceptions apply. Players may hold more than one non-FIFA nationality.

No.	Pos.	Nation	Player
1	GK	ESP	Antonio Adán (3rd captain)
2	DF	BRA	Matheus Reis
3	DF	NED	Jerry St. Juste
4	DF	URU	Sebastián Coates (captain)
5	MF	JPN	Hidemasa Morita
6	MF	GRE	Sotiris Alexandropoulos
10	MF	ENG	Marcus Edwards
11	MF	POR	Nuno Santos
12	GK	URU	Franco Israel
13	DF	POR	Luís Neto (vice-captain)
15	MF	URU	Manuel Ugarte
16	MF	POR	Rochinha
17	FW	POR	Francisco Trincão (on loan from Barcelona)
18	FW	GHA	Abdul Fatawu Issahaku
19	DF	ESP	Héctor Bellerín
20	FW	POR	Paulinho
22	GK	POR	André Paulo

No.	Pos.	Nation	Player
23	MF	POR	Daniel Bragança
25	DF	POR	Gonçalo Inácio (5th captain)
26	DF	CIV	Ousmane Diomande
28	MF	POR	Pedro Gonçalves
32	MF	ARG	Mateo Tanlongo
33	FW	BRA	Arthur Gomes
41	GK	BRA	Diego Callai
46	DF	POR	Gonçalo Esteves
47	DF	POR	Ricardo Esgaio (4th captain)
71	DF	POR	Flávio Nazinho
73	DF	POR	Chico Lamba
77	FW	CPV	Jovane Cabral
79	FW	POR	Youssef Chermiti
82	MF	POR	Mateus Fernandes
84	MF	POR	Dário Essugo
91	FW	POR	Rodrigo Ribeiro

=== Other players under contract ===
Note: Flags indicate national team as defined under FIFA eligibility rules; some limited exceptions apply. Players may hold more than one non-FIFA nationality.

No.	Pos.	Nation	Player
92	MF	BRA	Eduardo Henrique

=== Out on loan ===
Note: Flags indicate national team as defined under FIFA eligibility rules; some limited exceptions apply. Players may hold more than one non-FIFA nationality.

No.	Pos.	Nation	Player
—	DF	POR	Eduardo Quaresma (at 1899 Hoffenheim until 30 June 2023)
—	DF	ESP	José Marsà (at Sporting Gijón until 30 June 2023)
—	DF	ESP	Pedro Porro (at Tottenham Hotspur until 30 June 2023)
—	DF	POR	Rúben Vinagre (at Everton until 30 June 2023)
—	DF	POR	Tiago Ilori (at Paços de Ferreira until 30 June 2023)

No.	Pos.	Nation	Player
—	MF	CIV	Idrissa Doumbia (at Alanyaspor until 30 June 2023)
—	MF	POR	Renato Veiga (at Augsburg until 31 December 2023)
—	FW	POR	Rafael Camacho (at Aris until 30 June 2023)
—	FW	POR	Tiago Tomás (at VfB Stuttgart until 30 June 2023)

== Transfers ==
=== In ===
==== Summer ====
No.	Pos	Player	Transferred from	Fee	Date	Source
16	DF	(Portugal) Rúben Vinagre	(England) Wolverhampton Wanderers	€10,000,000	1 July 2022	
24	DF	(Spain) Pedro Porro	(England) Manchester City	€8,500,000	1 July 2022	
3	DF	(Netherlands) Jeremiah St. Juste	(Germany) Mainz 05	€9,500,000	1 July 2022	
5	MF	(Japan) Hidemasa Morita	(Portugal) Santa Clara	€3,800,000	1 July 2022	
22	GK	(Uruguay) Franco Israel	(Italy) Juventus U23	€650,000	5 July 2022	
27	FW	(Portugal) Rochinha	(Portugal) Vitória de Guimarães	€2,000,000	6 July 2022	
17	FW	(Portugal) Francisco Trincão	(Spain) Barcelona	Loan (€3,000,000)	13 July 2022	
6	MF	(Greece) Sotiris Alexandropoulos	(Greece) Panathinaikos	€4,500,000	29 August 2022	
33	FW	(Brazil) Arthur Gomes	(Portugal) Estoril	€2,500,000	1 September 2022	
Disclosed total
€44,450,000

==== Winter ====
No.	Pos	Player	Transferred from	Fee	Date	Source
32	MF	(Argentina) Mateo Tanlongo	(Argentina) Rosario Central	Free	5 January 2023	

=== Out ===
No.	Pos	Player	Transferred to	Fee	Date	Source
3	DF	(Morocco) Zouhair Feddal	(Spain) Valladolid	Free	15 May 2022	
—	DF	(Portugal) Nuno Mendes	(France) Paris Saint-Germain	€38,000,000	10 June 2022	
—	FW	(Portugal) Pedro Marques	(Netherlands) NEC	Free	21 June 2022	
87	DF	(Portugal) Gonçalo Esteves	(Portugal) Estoril	Loan	1 July 2022	
6	MF	(Portugal) João Palhinha	(England) Fulham	€20,000,000	4 July 2022	
—	FW	(Ecuador) Gonzalo Plata	(Spain) Valladolid	€3,000,000	11 July 2022	
40	GK	(Brazil) Renan Ribeiro	(Saudi Arabia) Al Ahli	Free	20 July 2022	
—	FW	(Brazil) Luiz Phellype	(Japan) FC Tokyo	Loan	20 July 2022	
—	FW	(Portugal) Rafael Camacho	(Greece) Aris	Loan	20 July 2022	
—	FW	(Slovenia) Andraž Šporar	(Greece) Panathinaikos	€3,500,000	26 July 2022	
16	DF	(Portugal) Rúben Vinagre	(England) Everton	Loan	27 July 2022	
8	MF	(Portugal) Matheus Nunes	(England) Wolverhampton Wanderers	€45,000,000	17 August 2022	
—	DF	(Portugal) Tiago Ilori	(Portugal) Paços de Ferreira	Loan	22 July 2022	
—	DF	(Portugal) Eduardo Quaresma	(Germany) Hoffenheim	Loan	4 August 2022	
—	MF	(Ivory Coast) Idrissa Doumbia	(Portugal) Paços de Ferreira	Loan	5 August 2022	
9	FW	(Algeria) Islam Slimani	(France) Brest	€1,500,000	25 August 2022	
—	FW	(Portugal) Pedro Mendes	(Italy) Ascoli	€500,000	29 August 2022	
Disclosed total
€111,500,000

== Pre-season and friendlies ==
Win Draw Loss Fixtures

13 July 2022 Friendly	Sporting CP (Portugal)	1–1	(Belgium) Union Saint-Gilloise	Parchal
19:00 WEST (UTC+1)	Porro 19' (pen.)	Report	Sykes (yellow card) 20', (goal) 50'	Stadium: Complexo Desportivo Belavista

14 July 2022 Friendly	Sporting CP (Portugal)	1–1	(Spain) Villarreal	Faro/Loulé
21:00 WEST (UTC+1)	Gonçalves 40'	Report	Baena 68'	Stadium: Estádio Algarve; Referee: Ricardo Baixinho

19 July 2022 Friendly	Sporting CP (Portugal)	3–2	(Italy) Roma	Faro/Loulé
20:00 WEST (UTC+1)	Gonçalves 29' (pen.); Inácio 53'; Ugarte (yellow card) 62'; Nunes (yellow card) 85'; Tabata 86'	Report	Inácio 31' (o.g.); Smalling (yellow card) 52'; Mancini (yellow card) 58'; Pellegrini 69'; Zaniolo (yellow card) 79'; Veretout (yellow card) 85'	Stadium: Estádio Algarve; Referee: Hugo Silva

24 July 2022 Troféu Cinco Violinos	Sporting CP (Portugal)	1–1 (5–6 p)	(Spain) Sevilla	Lisbon
19:45 WEST (UTC+1)	Tabata (yellow card) 55'; Paulinho 82'; Edwards (yellow card) 90'	Report	Corona 15'; Acuña (yellow card) 54'	Stadium: Estádio José Alvalade; Referee: António Nobre (Portugal)
	Penalties
	Porro (penalty scored); Gonçalves (penalty scored); Rochinha (penalty scored); Tabata (penalty scored); Edwards (penalty scored); Issahaku (penalty missed)		(penalty scored) Gudelj; (penalty scored) Ocampos; (penalty scored) Gómez; (penalty scored) Jordán; (penalty scored) Suso; (penalty scored) Montiel

30 July 2022 Friendly	Sporting CP (Portugal)	1–1	(England) Wolverhampton Wanderers	Faro/Loulé
--:-- WEST (UTC+1)				Stadium: Estádio Algarve

23 September 2022 Friendly	Sporting CP (Portugal)	1–0	(Portugal) Vilafranquense	Alcochete
19:00 WEST (UTC+1)		Report		Stadium: Academia

== Competitions ==
=== Overall record ===
Competition	First match	Last match	Starting round	Final position	Record							
Competition	First match	Last match	Starting round	Final position	Pld	W	D	L	GF	GA	GD	Win %
Primeira Liga	7 August 2022	26 May 2023	Matchday 1	4th	34	23	5	6	71	32	+39	67.65
Taça de Portugal	16 October 2022		Third round	Third round	1	0	0	1	0	1	−1	0.00
Taça da Liga	30 November 2022	28 January 2023	Group stage	Runners-up	6	5	0	1	20	3	+17	83.33
UEFA Champions League	7 September 2022	1 November 2022	Group stage	Group stage	6	2	1	3	8	9	−1	33.33
UEFA Europa League	16 February 2023	20 April 2023	Knockout round play-offs	Quarter-finals	6	1	4	1	9	6	+3	16.67
Total					53	31	10	12	108	51	+57	58.49

Source: Soccerway

=== Primeira Liga ===
==== League table ====
Pos	Team	Pld	W	D	L	GF	GA	GD	Pts	Qualification or relegation
2	Porto	34	27	4	3	73	22	+51	85	Qualification for the Champions League group stage
3	Braga	34	25	3	6	75	30	+45	78	Qualification for the Champions League third qualifying round
4	Sporting CP	34	23	5	6	71	32	+39	74	Qualification for the Europa League group stage
5	Arouca	34	15	9	10	36	37	−1	54	Qualification for the Europa Conference League third qualifying round
6	Vitória de Guimarães	34	16	5	13	34	39	−5	53	Qualification for the Europa Conference League second qualifying round

Source: Liga Portugal
Rules for classification: 1) Points; 2) Head-to-head points; 3) Head-to-head goal difference; 4) Goal difference; 5) Matches won; 6) Goals scored; 7) Play-off.

==== Results summary ====
Overall								Home						Away					
Pld	W	D	L	GF	GA	GD	Pts	W	D	L	GF	GA	GD	W	D	L	GF	GA	GD
34	23	5	6	71	32	+39	74	13	2	2	42	12	+30	10	3	4	29	20	+9

Source: Liga Portugal

==== Results by round ====
Round	1	2	3	4	5	6	7	8	9	10	11	12	13	14	15	16	17	18	19	20	21	22	23	24	25	26	27	28	29	30	31	32	33	34
Ground	A	H	A	H	A	H	A	H	A	H	A	H	A	H	A	A	H	H	A	H	A	H	A	H	A	H	A	H	A	H	A	H	H	A
Result	D	W	L	L	W	W	L	W	W	W	L	W	W	W	L	D	W	W	W	L	W	W	W	W	D	W	W	D	W	W	W	W	D	W
Position	8	5	12	13	8	7	8	7	5	4	6	5	4	4	4	4	4	4	4	4	4	4	4	4	4	4	4	4	4	4	4	4	4	4

Source: Liga Portugal
A = Away; H = Home; W = Win; D = Draw; L = Loss

==== Matches ====
7 August 2022 1	Braga	3–3	Sporting CP	Braga
18:00 WEST (UTC+01:00)	Banza 14'; Niakaté 45+1'; Ruiz 88'	Report	Gonçalves 9'; Santos 18'; Edwards 83'	Stadium: Estádio Municipal de Braga; Attendance: 17,714; Referee: Fábio Veríssimo

13 August 2022 2	Sporting CP	3–0	Rio Ave	Lisbon
20:30 WEST (UTC+01:00)	Gonçalves 36', 75'; Nunes 66'	Report		Stadium: Estádio José Alvalade; Attendance: 31,760; Referee: Manuel Mota

20 August 2022 3	Porto	3–0	Sporting CP	Porto
20:30 WEST (UTC+01:00)	Evanilson 42'; Uribe 77' (pen.); Galeno 86' (pen.)	Report		Stadium: Estádio do Dragão; Attendance: 49,430; Referee: Nuno Almeida

27 August 2022 4	Sporting CP	0–2	Chaves	Lisbon
20:30 WEST (UTC+01:00)		Report	Vitória 60'; Vieira 63'	Stadium: Estádio José Alvalade; Attendance: 31,408; Referee: André Narciso

2 September 2022 5	Estoril	0–2	Sporting CP	Estoril
21:15 WEST (UTC+01:00)		Report	Juste 13'; Edwards 21'	Stadium: Estádio António Coimbra da Mota; Attendance: 4,718; Referee: Manuel Oliveira

10 September 2022 6	Sporting CP	4–0	Portimonense	Lisbon
18:00 WEST (UTC+01:00)	Trincão 7', 41'; Gonçalves 72'; Santos 76'	Report		Stadium: Estádio José Alvalade; Attendance: 29,782; Referee: Claúdio Pereira

17 September 2022 7	Boavista	2–1	Sporting CP	Porto
20:30 WEST (UTC+01:00)	Lourenço 45+2', 83' (pen.)	Report	Edwards 55'	Stadium: Estádio do Bessa; Attendance: 8,480; Referee: João Pinheiro

30 September 2022 8	Sporting CP	3–1	Gil Vicente	Lisbon
19:00 WEST (UTC+01:00)	Morita 16'; Gonçalves 22'; Rochinha 82'	Report	Navarro 90+3'	Stadium: Estádio José Alvalade; Attendance: 27,829; Referee: Tiago Martins

8 October 2022 9	Santa Clara	1–2	Sporting CP	Ponta Delgada
14:30 AZOST (UTC±00:00)	Tagawa 90+4'	Report	Morita 29'; Santos 90'	Stadium: Estádio de São Miguel; Attendance: 4,447; Referee: Artur Soares Dias

22 October 2022 10	Sporting CP	3–1	Casa Pia	Lisbon
20:30 WEST (UTC+01:00)	Paulinho 57'; Santos 59'; Gonçalves 65'	Report	Clayton 43'	Stadium: Estádio José Alvalade; Attendance: 26,679; Referee: Hélder Malheiro

29 October 2022 11	Arouca	1–0	Sporting CP	Arouca
20:30 WEST (UTC+01:00)	Basso 47'	Report		Stadium: Estádio Municipal de Arouca; Attendance: 2,364; Referee: Rui Costa

5 November 2022 12	Sporting CP	3–0	Vitória de Guimarães	Lisbon
20:30 WET (UTC±00:00)	Edwards 34', 55'; Morita 40'	Report		Stadium: Estádio José Alvalade; Attendance: 27,324; Referee: Manuel Mota

13 November 2022 13	Famalicão	1–2	Sporting CP	Vila Nova de Famalicão
20:30 WET (UTC±00:00)	Jaime 78'	Report	Trincão 42'; Gonçalves 45+3'	Stadium: Estádio Municipal 22 de Junho; Attendance: 3,937; Referee: Artur Soares Dias

29 December 2022 14	Sporting CP	3–0	Paços de Ferreira	Lisbon
21:15 WET (UTC±00:00)	Porro 3'; Santos 22'; Paulinho 44'	Report		Stadium: Estádio José Alvalade; Attendance: 31,005; Referee: António Nobre

8 January 2023 15	Marítimo	1–0	Sporting CP	Funchal
18:00 WET (UTC±00:00)	Winck 55' (pen.)	Report		Stadium: Estádio do Marítimo; Attendance: 9,510; Referee: Hélder Malheiro

15 January 2023 16	Benfica	2–2	Sporting CP	Lisbon
18:00 WET (UTC±00:00)	Ramos 37', 64'	Report	Bah 27' (o.g.); Gonçalves 53' (pen.)	Stadium: Estádio da Luz; Attendance: 62,295; Referee: Artur Soares Dias

20 January 2023 17	Sporting CP	2–1	Vizela	Lisbon
21:15 WET (UTC±00:00)	Gonçalves 59'; Porro 90+5' (pen.)	Report	Mendez 75'	Stadium: Estádio José Alvalade; Attendance: 23,358; Referee: Rui Costa

2 February 2023 18	Sporting CP	5–0	Braga	Lisbon
21:15 WET (UTC±00:00)	Morita 9', 46'; Edwards 61'; Reis 86'; Gonçalves 90+3' (pen.)	Report		Stadium: Estádio José Alvalade; Attendance: 26,338; Referee: Nuno Almeida

6 February 2023 19	Rio Ave	0–1	Sporting CP	Vila do Conde
21:15 WET (UTC±00:00)		Report	Chermiti 84'	Stadium: Estádio dos Arcos; Attendance: 4,125; Referee: Manuel Mota

12 February 2023 20	Sporting CP	1–2	Porto	Lisbon
18:00 WET (UTC±00:00)	Chermiti 90+7'	Report	Uribe 60'; Pepê 90+4'	Stadium: Estádio José Alvalade; Attendance: 39,528; Referee: Artur Soares Dias

20 February 2023 21	Chaves	2–3	Sporting CP	Chaves
19:00 WET (UTC±00:00)	Teixeira 34'; Hernández 90+6'	Report	Gonçalves 8' (pen.), 61'; Santos 70'	Stadium: Estádio Municipal de Chaves; Attendance: 4,981; Referee: António Nobre

27 February 2023 22	Sporting CP	2–0	Estoril	Lisbon
19:00 WET (UTC±00:00)	Bellerín 40'; Trincão 51'	Report		Stadium: Estádio José Alvalade; Attendance: 22,313; Referee: Manuel Mota

4 March 2023 23	Portimonense	0–1	Sporting CP	Portimão
18:00 WET (UTC±00:00)		Report	Paulinho 77'	Stadium: Estádio Municipal de Portimão; Attendance: 4,474; Referee: Gustavo Correia

12 March 2023 24	Sporting CP	3–0	Boavista	Lisbon
20:30 WET (UTC±00:00)	Santos 17'; Agra 43' (o.g.); Paulinho 90+3'	Report		Stadium: Estádio José Alvalade; Attendance: 27,535; Referee: João Pinheiro

1 April 2023 26	Sporting CP	3–0	Santa Clara	Lisbon
20:30 WEST (UTC+01:00)	Paulinho 14'; Trincão 22'; Edwards 52'	Report		Stadium: Estádio José Alvalade; Attendance: 31,603; Referee: André Narciso

5 April 2023 25	Gil Vicente	0–0	Sporting CP	Barcelos
20:15 WEST (UTC+01:00)		Report		Stadium: Estádio Cidade de Barcelos; Attendance: 8,076; Referee: Nuno Almeida

9 April 2023 27	Casa Pia	3–4	Sporting CP	Oeiras
18:00 WEST (UTC+01:00)	Martins 7'; Soma 45+1'; Cardoso 62'	Report	Trincão 1', 39', 85'; Gonçalves 48'	Stadium: Estádio Nacional; Attendance: 10,509; Referee: Fábio Veríssimo

16 April 2023 28	Sporting CP	1–1	Arouca	Lisbon
20:30 WEST (UTC+01:00)	Gonçalves 87' (pen.)	Report	Antony 38'	Stadium: Estádio José Alvalade; Attendance: 25,584; Referee: Vítor Ferreira

24 April 2023 29	Vitória de Guimarães	0–2	Sporting CP	Guimarães
20:15 WEST (UTC+01:00)		Report	Gonçalves 47'; Arthur 90+3'	Stadium: Estádio D. Afonso Henriques; Attendance: 21,893; Referee: Luís Godinho

30 April 2023 30	Sporting CP	2–1	Famalicão	Lisbon
20:30 WEST (UTC+01:00)	Morita 18'; Esgaio 60'	Report	Coates 69' (o.g.)	Stadium: Estádio José Alvalade; Attendance: 29,443; Referee: Manuel Oliveira

7 May 2023 31	Paços de Ferreira	0–4	Sporting CP	Paços de Ferreira
20:30 WEST (UTC+01:00)		Report	Marafona 7' (o.g.); Santos 33'; Trincão 62'; Chermiti 90+3'	Stadium: Estádio da Mata Real; Attendance: 4,791; Referee: Nuno Almeida

13 May 2023 32	Sporting CP	2–1	Marítimo	Lisbon
20:30 WEST (UTC+01:00)	Matheus Costa 85'; Coates 90+3'	Report	Costa 10'	Stadium: Estádio José Alvalade; Attendance: 27,130; Referee: Tiago Martins

21 May 2023 33	Sporting CP	2–2	Benfica	Lisbon
20:30 WEST (UTC+01:00)	Trincão 39'; Diomande 44'	Report	Aursnes 71'; Neves 90+4'	Stadium: Estádio José Alvalade; Attendance: 39,348; Referee: João Pinheiro

26 May 2023 34	Vizela	1–2	Sporting CP	Vizela
21:15 WEST (UTC+01:00)	Osmajić 6'	Report	Inácio 20'; Fernandes 85' (o.g.)	Stadium: Estádio do FC Vizela; Attendance: 3,309; Referee: Claúdio Pereira

=== Taça de Portugal ===
Sporting entered in the third round.

16 October 2022 Third round	Varzim	1–0	Sporting	Barcelos
19:00 WEST (UTC+01:00)	João Faria 70'	Report		Stadium: Estádio Cidade de Barcelos; Referee: Bruno Costa

=== Taça da Liga ===
==== Third round ====
Pos	Team	Pld	W	D	L	GF	GA	GD	Pts	Qualification	SPO	RIO	FAR	MAR
1	Sporting CP	3	3	0	0	13	0	+13	9	Advance to knockout phase	—	—	6–0	5–0
2	Rio Ave	3	2	0	1	3	3	0	6		0–2	—	2–1	—
3	Farense	3	1	0	2	3	8	−5	3		—	—	—	2–0
4	Marítimo	3	0	0	3	0	8	−8	0		—	0–1	—	—

Source: Liga Portugal
Rules for classification: Tiebreakers

30 November 2022 1	Sporting CP	6–0	Farense	Lisbon
20:45 WET (UTC±00:00)	Paulinho 20', 22'; Edwards 39'; Gonçalves 48'; Arthur 75'; Fernandes 85' (pen.)	Report		Stadium: Estádio José Alvalade; Attendance: 17,008; Referee: Nuno Almeida

7 December 2022 2	Rio Ave	0–2	Sporting CP	Vila do Conde
20:30 WET (UTC±00:00)		Report	Inácio 62'; Boateng 73' (o.g.)	Stadium: Estádio dos Arcos; Attendance: 2,622; Referee: Miguel Nogueira

13 December 2022 3	Sporting CP	5–0	Marítimo	Lisbon
20:45 WET (UTC±00:00)	Paulinho 1', 15', 31'; Porro 73'; Silva 86' (pen.)	Report		Stadium: Estádio José Alvalade; Attendance: 1 Referee: André Narciso

==== Quarter-finals ====
19 December 2022	Sporting CP	5–0	Braga	Lisbon
20:15 WET (UTC±0)	Inácio 4'; Paulinho 7'; Gonçalves 20' (pen.); Trincão 41'; Edwards 45+4' (pen.)	Report		Stadium: Estádio José Alvalade; Attendance: 20,396; Referee: Luís Godinho

==== Semi-finals ====
24 January 2023	Arouca	1–2	Sporting CP	Leiria
19:45 WET (UTC±0)	Dabbagh 58'	Report	Paulinho 45+7', 82'	Stadium: Estádio Dr. Magalhães Pessoa; Attendance: 10,259; Referee: Fábio Veríssimo

==== Final ====
28 January 2023	Sporting CP	0–2	Porto	Leiria
19:45 WET (UTC±0)		Report	Eustáquio 10'; Marcano 86'	Stadium: Estádio Dr. Magalhães Pessoa; Attendance: 19,263; Referee: João Pinheiro

=== UEFA Champions League ===
==== Group stage ====
The draw for the group stage was held on 25 August 2022.

Pos	Team	Pld	W	D	L	GF	GA	GD	Pts	Qualification	TOT	FRA	SPO	MAR
1	(England) Tottenham Hotspur	6	3	2	1	8	6	+2	11	Advance to knockout phase	—	3–2	1–1	2–0
2	(Germany) Eintracht Frankfurt	6	3	1	2	7	8	−1	10	Advance to knockout phase	0–0	—	0–3	2–1
3	(Portugal) Sporting CP	6	2	1	3	8	9	−1	7	Transfer to Europa League	2–0	1–2	—	0–2
4	(France) Marseille	6	2	0	4	8	8	0	6		1–2	0–1	4–1	—

Source: UEFA
Rules for classification: Group stage tiebreakers

7 September 2022 1	Eintracht Frankfurt (Germany)	0–3	(Portugal) Sporting CP	Frankfurt, Germany
18:45 CEST (UTC+2)		Report	Edwards 65'; Trincão 67'; Santos 82'	Stadium: Waldstadion; Attendance: 50,500; Referee: Orel Grinfeld (Israel)

13 September 2022 2	Sporting CP (Portugal)	2–0	(England) Tottenham Hotspur	Lisbon, Portugal
17:45 WEST (UTC+1)	Paulinho 90'; Arthur 90+3'	Report		Stadium: Estádio José Alvalade; Attendance: 39,899; Referee: Srđan Jovanović (Serbia)

4 October 2022 3	Marseille (France)	4–1	(Portugal) Sporting CP	Marseille, France
19:05 CEST (UTC+2)	Sánchez 13'; Harit 16'; Balerdi 28'; Mbemba 84'	Report	Trincão 1'	Stadium: Stade Vélodrome; Attendance: 618; Referee: Davide Massa (Italy)
Note: The match was originally scheduled to be played at 18:45, but was delayed to 19:05 after the bus carrying Sporting CP's players was caught in traffic and arrived late at the stadium.

12 October 2022 4	Sporting CP (Portugal)	0–2	(France) Marseille	Lisbon, Portugal
20:00 WEST (UTC+1)		Report	Guendouzi 20' (pen.); Sánchez 30'	Stadium: Estádio José Alvalade; Attendance: 38,126; Referee: Alejandro Hernández Hernández (Spain)

26 October 2022 5	Tottenham Hotspur (England)	1–1	(Portugal) Sporting CP	London, England
20:00 BST (UTC+1)	Bentancur 80'	Report	Edwards 22'	Stadium: Tottenham Hotspur Stadium; Attendance: 59,588; Referee: Danny Makkelie (Netherlands)

1 November 2022 6	Sporting CP (Portugal)	1–2	(Germany) Eintracht Frankfurt	Lisbon, Portugal
20:00 WET (UTC±0)	Arthur 39'	Report	Kamada 62' (pen.); Kolo Muani 72'	Stadium: Estádio José Alvalade; Attendance: 41,744; Referee: Szymon Marciniak (Poland)

=== UEFA Europa League ===
==== Knockout phase ====
===== Knockout round play-offs =====
The Knockout round play-offs draw was held on 7 November 2022.

16 February 2023 First leg	Sporting CP (Portugal)	1–1	(Denmark) Midtjylland	Lisbon, Portugal
20:00 WET	Coates 90+4'	Report	Ashour 77'	Stadium: Estádio José Alvalade; Attendance: 23,279; Referee: François Letexier (France)

23 February 2023 Second leg	Midtjylland (Denmark)	0–4 (1–5 agg.)	(Portugal) Sporting CP	Herning, Denmark
18:45 CET		Report	Coates 21'; Gonçalves 50', 77'; Gartenmann 85' (o.g.)	Stadium: MCH Arena; Attendance: 9,576; Referee: Ivan Kružliak (Slovakia)

===== Round of 16 =====
The Round of 16 draw was held on 24 February 2023.

9 March 2023 First leg	Sporting CP (Portugal)	2–2	(England) Arsenal	Lisbon, Portugal
20:00 WET	Inácio 34'; Paulinho 55'	Report	Saliba 22'; Morita 62' (o.g.)	Stadium: Estádio José Alvalade; Attendance: 36,006; Referee: Tobias Stieler (Germany)

16 March 2023 Second leg	Arsenal (England)	1–1 (3–3 agg.) (3–5 p)	(Portugal) Sporting CP	London, England
20:00 GMT	Xhaka 19'	Report	Gonçalves 62'	Stadium: Emirates Stadium; Attendance: 59,929; Referee: Antonio Mateu Lahoz (Spain)
	Penalties
	Ødegaard (penalty scored); Saka (penalty scored); Trossard (penalty scored); Martinelli (penalty missed)		(penalty scored) St. Juste; (penalty scored) Esgaio; (penalty scored) Inácio; (penalty scored) Arthur; (penalty scored) Santos

===== Quarter-finals =====
The Quarter-finals draw was held on 17 March 2023.

13 April 2023 First leg	Juventus (Italy)	1–0	(Portugal) Sporting CP	Turin, Italy
21:00 CEST	Gatti 73'	Report		Stadium: Juventus Stadium; Attendance: 38,490; Referee: Halil Umut Meler (Turkey)

20 April 2023 Second leg	Sporting CP (Portugal)	1–1 (1–2 agg.)	(Italy) Juventus	Lisbon, Portugal
20:00 WEST	Edwards 20' (pen.)	Report	Rabiot 9'	Stadium: Estádio José Alvalade; Attendance: 45,903; Referee: François Letexier (France)

== Statistics ==
=== Appearances and goals ===
As of 26 May 2023

No.	Pos	Nat	Player	Total		Primeira Liga		Taça de Portugal		Taça da Liga		UEFA Champions League		UEFA Europa League	
No.	Pos	Nat	Player	Apps	Goals	Apps	Goals	Apps	Goals	Apps	Goals	Apps	Goals	Apps	Goals
Goalkeepers
1	GK	(Spain) ESP	Antonio Adán	46	0	31	0	0	0	4	0	5	0	6	0
12	GK	(Uruguay) URU	Franco Israel	8	0	3	0	1	0	2	0	1+1	0	0	0
22	GK	(Portugal) POR	André Paulo	0	0	0	0	0	0	0	0	0	0	0	0
41	GK	(Brazil) BRA	Diego Callai	0	0	0	0	0	0	0	0	0	0	0	0
Defenders
2	DF	(Brazil) BRA	Matheus Reis	51	1	26+7	1	1	0	6	0	5+1	0	3+2	0
3	DF	(Netherlands) NED	Jerry St. Juste	32	1	7+14	1	0	0	1+1	0	3+1	0	5	0
4	DF	(Uruguay) URU	Sebastián Coates	44	3	30	1	0	0	4	0	5	0	5	2
13	DF	(Portugal) POR	Luís Neto	7	0	4+2	0	0	0	0	0	0+1	0	0	0
19	DF	(Spain) ESP	Héctor Bellerín	13	1	6+4	1	0	0	0	0	0	0	0+3	0
25	DF	(Portugal) POR	Gonçalo Inácio	52	4	26+7	1	1	0	5+1	2	6	0	5+1	1
26	DF	(Ivory Coast) CIV	Ousmane Diomande	17	1	11+2	1	0	0	0	0	0	0	2+2	0
46	DF	(Portugal) POR	Gonçalo Esteves	6	0	0	0	0	0	0	0	0	0	6	0
47	DF	(Portugal) POR	Ricardo Esgaio	32	1	15+10	1	0	0	1+3	0	2+1	0	0	0
71	DF	(Portugal) POR	Flávio Nazinho	6	0	2+1	0	0	0	0	0	0+3	0	0	0
73	DF	(Portugal) POR	Chico Lamba	1	0	0+1	0	0	0	0	0	0	0	0	0
Midfielders
5	MF	(Japan) JPN	Hidemasa Morita	41	6	21+8	6	1	0	2	0	5	0	4	0
6	MF	(Greece) GRE	Sotiris Alexandropoulos	14	0	0+6	0	1	0	0+4	0	0+3	0	0	0
10	MF	(England) ENG	Marcus Edwards	51	12	27+6	7	1	0	5	2	6	2	6	1
11	MF	(Portugal) POR	Nuno Santos	49	9	25+6	8	1	0	5	0	5+1	1	3+3	0
15	MF	(Uruguay) URU	Manuel Ugarte	45	0	28+3	0	0+1	0	4+1	0	6	0	0+2	0
16	MF	(Portugal) POR	Rochinha	20	1	3+13	1	0+1	0	0+2	0	0+1	0	0	0
23	MF	(Portugal) POR	Daniel Bragança	0	0	0	0	0	0	0	0	0	0	0	0
28	MF	(Portugal) POR	Pedro Gonçalves	51	20	33	15	0+1	0	5+1	2	5	0	6	3
32	MF	(Argentina) ARG	Mateo Tanlongo	14	0	0+9	0	0	0	0+2	0	0	0	0+3	0
82	MF	(Portugal) POR	Mateus Fernandes	7	1	1+2	0	0	0	1+1	1	0+1	0	0+1	0
84	MF	(Portugal) POR	Dário Essugo	10	0	3+1	0	0	0	2+1	0	0+1	0	0+2	0
Forwards
17	FW	(Portugal) POR	Francisco Trincão	52	13	26+8	10	1	0	4+1	1	5+1	2	4+2	0
18	FW	(Ghana) GHA	Abdul Fatawu Issahaku	12	0	1+5	0	0+1	0	0+2	0	0+2	0	0+1	0
20	FW	(Portugal) POR	Paulinho	38	15	14+8	5	1	0	6	8	2+3	1	4	1
33	FW	(Brazil) BRA	Arthur Gomes	38	4	6+18	1	0	0	1+5	1	1+2	2	2+3	0
77	FW	(Cape Verde) CPV	Jovane Cabral	10	0	0+4	0	0+1	0	1+3	0	0+1	0	0	0
79	FW	(Portugal) POR	Youssef Chermiti	31	3	16+9	3	0	0	0+1	0	0	0	1+4	0
91	FW	(Portugal) POR	Rodrigo Ribeiro	2	0	0+2	0	0	0	0	0	0	0	0	0
Players who have made an appearance this season but have left the club
24	DF	(Spain) ESP	Pedro Porro	21	3	12+2	2	1	0	5+1	1	0	0	0	0
63	DF	(Spain) ESP	José Marsà	7	0	2	0	1	0	2	0	0+2	0	0	0
8	DF	(Portugal) POR	Matheus Nunes	2	1	2	1	0	0	0	0	0	0	0	0

- Source: soccerway
