= Ousmane Diomande =

Ivorian footballer (born 2003)

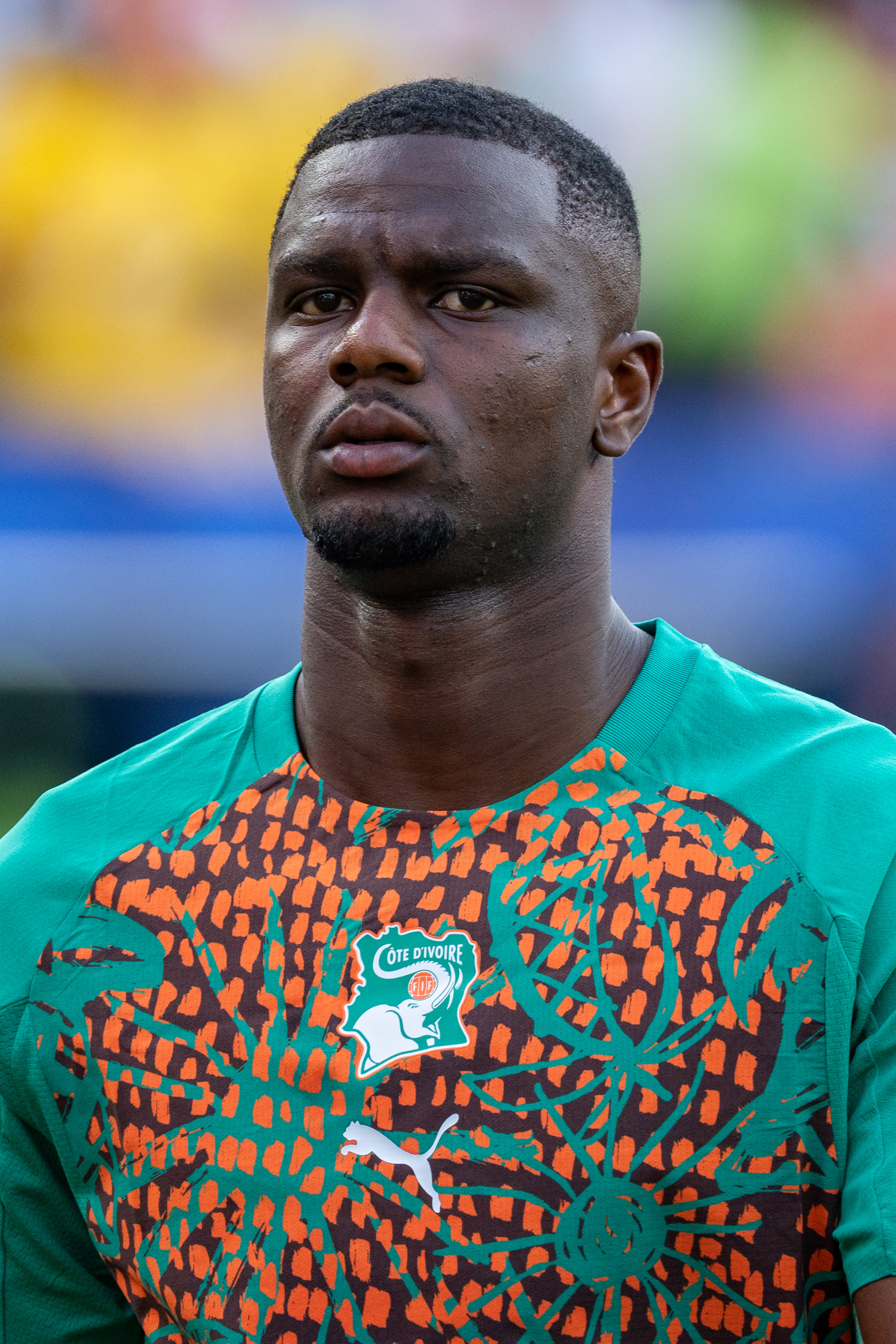
- Diomande with the Ivory Coast in 2026

Personal information
- Full name: Ousmane Diomande
- Date of birth: 4 December 2003 (age 22)
- Place of birth: Abidjan, Ivory Coast
- Height: 1.88 m (6 ft 2 in)
- Position: Centre-back

Team information
- Current team: Nottingham Forest
- Number: 2

Youth career
- 2014–2020: OS Abobo
- 2020–2022: Midtjylland

Senior career*
| Years | Team | Apps | (Gls) |
| 2022–2023 | Midtjylland | 0 | (0) |
| 2022–2023 | → Mafra (loan) | 13 | (0) |
| 2023–2026 | Sporting CP | 87 | (5) |
| 2026– | Nottingham Forest | 5 | (0) |

International career^{‡}
| 2023– | Ivory Coast | 18 | (1) |
Medal record
Men's football
Representing Ivory Coast
Africa Cup of Nations
| Winner | 2023 Ivory Coast |
- * Club domestic league appearances and goals as of 18:23, 18 October 2026 (UTC) ‡ National team caps and goals as of 21:15, 3 October 2026 (UTC)

Ousmane Diomande (born 4 December 2003) is an Ivorian professional footballer who plays as a centre-back for Premier League club Nottingham Forest and the Ivory Coast national team.

== Club career ==
=== Midtjylland ===
Diomande is a youth product of the Ivorian club Olympic Sport Abobo, having joined at the age of 10. He moved to the youth academy of the Danish club Midtjylland in January 2020.

Diomande joined the Portuguese club Mafra on loan on 5 August 2022 on a season-long loan. The next day he made his professional debut with Mafra in a 3–1 Liga Portugal 2 loss to Oliveirense on 6 August 2022.

=== Sporting ===
Thanks to impressive performances with Mafra, Diomande's loan was cut short halfway through the season and he transferred to Primeira Liga club Sporting CP on 31 January 2023, signing a contract until June 2027 for a fee of €7.5 million, which could rise to €12.5 million with add-ons. Midtjylland is also owed 20% of the profit Sporting receives from a future transfer. Diomande's release clause was set at €80 million.

Diomande made his debut for the Lisbon club on 7 February, coming off the bench to replace Matheus Reis on the final minutes of a 1–0 league victory away at Rio Ave. Two weeks later, he made his first start for the Lions, in a 3–2 league victory away at Chaves, where he was replaced by Jeremiah St. Juste on the 71st minute. Diomande made his European debut on 9 March, coming off the bench to replace Ricardo Esgaio on the 77th minute of a 2–2 draw at home to Arsenal in the UEFA Europa League round of 16 first leg. Eight days later, on the return fixture in the Emirates Stadium, Diomande started and played the full match, as Sporting drew 1–1 and eliminated Arsenal through penalty shootout. The Ivorian scored his first goal for the Lions on 21 May 2023, in the Lisbon derby, out-jumping Álex Grimaldo to head a Nuno Santos corner into the net, making the score 2–0 for Sporting; however, Benfica went on to salvage a 2–2 draw. Sporting CP finished the 2022–23 season in 4th place in the Primeira Liga, qualifying for the 2023–24 UEFA Europa League group stage.

On 21 September 2023, Diomande scored his first goal in European competitions, through a 84th-minute winner in a 2–1 victory away at Sturm Graz in the UEFA Europa League. On 23 January 2026, Diomande extended his contract with Sporting CP until June 2030.

=== Nottingham Forest ===
On 11 August 2026, Diomande signed for Premier League club Nottingham Forest on a four-year contract with an option to extend for a further year. The transfer fee was reportedly €40m.

== International career ==
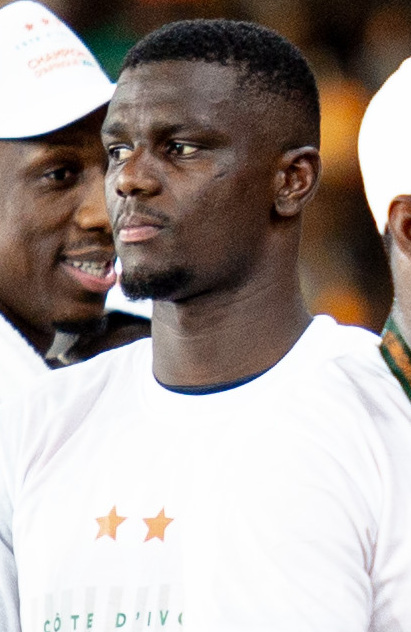
Diomande in 2024

Diomande was called up to the Ivory Coast national team for a set of 2023 Africa Cup of Nations qualification matches in September 2023. He debuted in a 1–0 win over Lesotho on 9 September 2023. In December 2023, Diomande was named to the Ivory Coast's squad for the 2023 Africa Cup of Nations. Despite only featuring for first two group stage matches against Guinea-Bissau and Nigeria, Ivory Coast ended up winning the tournament on 11 February, after defeating Nigeria 2–1 in the final.

Diomande was included in the list of Ivorian players selected by coach Emerse Faé to participate in the 2025 Africa Cup of Nations. On 15 May 2026, Diomandé was integrated by Ivory Coast coach Emerse Fae in his list of 26 players in order to compete in the 2026 World Cup.

== Style of play ==
As a central defender, he has the ability to play out from the back and drive the team forward, allowing his team to play out of trouble and turn defence to attack quickly. His main strengths are his physicality, his vision and his speed, but he has also notable short passing, dribbling, positioning, anticipation and tackling attributes.

== Career statistics ==
=== Club ===
As of match played 18 October 2026

Appearances and goals by club, season and competition
| Club | Season | League | | | National cup (Note: Includes Taça de Portugal) | | League cup (Note: Includes Taça da Liga, EFL Cup) | | Europe | | Other | | Total | |
| Club | Season | Division | Apps | Goals | Apps | Goals | Apps | Goals | Apps | Goals | Apps | Goals | Apps | Goals |
|---|---|---|---|---|---|---|---|---|---|---|---|---|---|---|
| Mafra (loan) | 2022–23 | Liga Portugal 2 | 13 | 0 | 1 | 0 | 3 | 1 | — | | — | | 17 | 1 |
| Sporting CP | 2022–23 | Primeira Liga | 13 | 1 | 0 | 0 | 0 | 0 | 4 (Note: Appearances in UEFA Europa League) | 0 | — | | 17 | 1 |
| Sporting CP | 2023–24 | Primeira Liga | 26 | 2 | 3 | 0 | 1 | 0 | 8 | 1 | — | | 38 | 3 |
| Sporting CP | 2024–25 | Primeira Liga | 31 | 2 | 3 | 0 | 2 | 0 | 9 (Note: Appearances in UEFA Champions League) | 0 | 1 (Note: Appearance in Supertaça Cândido de Oliveira) | 0 | 46 | 2 |
| Sporting CP | 2025–26 | Primeira Liga | 17 | 0 | 4 | 0 | 0 | 0 | 9 | 1 | 1 | 0 | 31 | 1 |
| Sporting CP | Total | | 87 | 5 | 10 | 0 | 3 | 0 | 30 | 2 | 2 | 0 | 132 | 7 |
| Nottingham Forest | 2026–27 | Premier League | 5 | 0 | 0 | 0 | 1 | 0 | — | | — | | 6 | 0 |
| Career total | | | 105 | 5 | 11 | 0 | 7 | 1 | 30 | 2 | 2 | 0 | 155 | 8 |

=== International ===
As of match played 3 October 2026

Appearances and goals by national team and year
| National team | Year | Apps | Goals |
|---|---|---|---|
| Ivory Coast | 2023 | 3 | 0 |
| Ivory Coast | 2024 | 5 | 1 |
| Ivory Coast | 2025 | 3 | 0 |
| Ivory Coast | 2026 | 7 | 0 |
| Total | | 18 | 1 |

Scores and results list Ivory Coast's goal tally first, score column indicates score after each Diomande goal.

List of international goals scored by Ousmane Diomande
| No. | Date | Venue | Opponent | Score | Result | Competition |
|---|---|---|---|---|---|---|
| 1 | 6 January 2024 | Laurent Pokou Stadium, San Pédro, Ivory Coast | Sierra Leone | 1–0 | 5–1 | Friendly |

== Honours ==
Sporting CP

- Primeira Liga: 2023–24, 2024–25
- Taça de Portugal: 2024–25

Ivory Coast

- Africa Cup of Nations: 2023

Individual

- Primeira Liga Team of the Year: 2023–24, 2024–25
- Primeira Liga Defender of the Month: September 2023, January 2025
