= Franco Israel =

Uruguayan footballer (born 2000)

Personal information
- Full name: Franco Israel Wibmer
- Date of birth: 22 April 2000 (age 26)
- Place of birth: Nueva Helvecia, Uruguay
- Height: 1.90 m (6 ft 3 in)
- Position: Goalkeeper

Team information
- Current team: Torino
- Number: 81

Youth career
- 2010–2016: Club Artesano
- 2016–2018: Nacional
- 2018–2020: Juventus

Senior career*
Years	Team	Apps	(Gls)
2020–2022	Juventus U23	50	(0)
2022–2025	Sporting CP	24	(0)
2025–	Torino	9	(0)

International career^{‡}
2016–2017	Uruguay U17	6	(0)
2017	Uruguay U18	7	(0)
2018–2019	Uruguay U20	14	(0)
2023–	Uruguay	3	(0)
Medal record
Men's football
Representing Uruguay
Copa América
Third place	2024 United States
South American Games
Silver medal – second place	2018 Cochabamba	Team
- * Club domestic league appearances and goals as of 8 December 2025 ‡ National team caps and goals as of 13 October 2025

Franco Israel Wibmer (born 22 April 2000) is a Uruguayan professional footballer who plays as a goalkeeper for Serie A club Torino and the Uruguay national team.

== Early life ==
Franco Israel was born on 22 April 2000 in Nueva Helvecia, a city in the Colonia Department of Uruguay. He is of maternal German descent, whereas his father's side is of Italian heritage, tracing his ancestry to Bobbio Pellice, a comune in the Piedmont region. Along with his native Uruguayan passport, Franco Israel also holds an Italian passport. He has one older brother, Alec, whom he lived with during his tenure with Nacional. During his youth, Israel played basketball and football as a child, before opting for the latter, when the games of the two teams he represented began being scheduled on the same day.

== Club career ==
=== Early career ===
Israel started his football career in the youth ranks of local club Artesano, before joining Nacional's youth setup in 2016, moving subsequently to the city of Montevideo.

=== Juventus U23 ===
Having impressed in Nacional's 2018 U-20 Copa Libertadores campaign, which they won, Italian club Juventus signed him on 17 August 2018, on a five-year deal for a transfer worth €2.2 million. He made his professional debut on 28 September 2020 in Juventus U23's 2–1 league win against Pro Sesto. On 24 November, first-team manager, Andrea Pirlo called up Israel for a UEFA Champions League match against Ferencváros; he was eventually called up three other times in the 2020–21 season.

=== Sporting CP ===
On 5 July 2022, Israel signed a five-year contract with Portuguese club Sporting CP for a fee of €650,000 for 60% of his economic rights. He made his competitive debut for Sporting, on 4 October, in a Champions League away match against Marseille, where he replaced Marcus Edwards early in the first-half, after starting goalkeeper Antonio Adán was sent off; he conceded two goals as the match ended in a 4–1 loss. In the reverse fixture a week later, Israel made his first start, featuring in a 2–0 home loss.

=== Torino ===
On 27 July 2025, Israel joined Serie A club Torino on a three-year contract.

== International career ==
Israel is a former Uruguay youth international. He has represented Uruguay at several tournaments including the 2019 South American U-20 Championship and the 2019 FIFA U-20 World Cup.

In June 2023, Israel received his first call-up to the senior team. He made his debut on 14 June 2023 in a 4–1 win against Nicaragua. In June 2024, he was named in Uruguay's 26-man squad for the 2024 Copa América.

== Career statistics ==
=== Club ===
As of match played 30 November 2025

Appearances and goals by club, season and competition
Club	Season	League			National cup (Note: Includes Taça de Portugal, Coppa Italia)		League cup		Continental		Other		Total	
Club	Season	Division	Apps	Goals	Apps	Goals	Apps	Goals	Apps	Goals	Apps	Goals	Apps	Goals
Juventus U23	2020–21	Serie C	18	0	—		—		—		2 (Note: Appearances in Serie C promotion play-offs)	0	20	0
Juventus U23	2021–22	Serie C	32	0	—		—		—		7 (Note: One appearance in Coppa Italia Serie C, six appearances in Serie C promotion play-offs)	0	39	0
Juventus U23	Total		50	0	—		—		—		9	0	59	0
Juventus	2020–21	Serie A	0	0	0	0	—		0	0	0	0	0	0
Juventus	2021–22	Serie A	0	0	0	0	—		0	0	0	0	0	0
Juventus	Total		0	0	0	0	—		0	0	0	0	0	0
Sporting CP	2022–23	Primeira Liga	3	0	1	0	2	0	2 (Note: Appearances in UEFA Champions League)	0	—		8	0
Sporting CP	2023–24	Primeira Liga	10	0	6	0	3	0	4 (Note: Appearances in UEFA Europa League)	0	—		23	0
Sporting CP	2024–25	Primeira Liga	11	0	1	0	2	0	8	0	0	0	22	0
Sporting CP	Total		24	0	8	0	7	0	14	0	0	0	53	0
Torino	2025–26	Serie A	8	0	1	0	—		—		—		9	0
Career total			82	0	9	0	7	0	14	0	9	0	121	0

=== International ===
As of match played 13 October 2025

Appearances and goals by national team and year
National team	Year	Apps	Goals
Uruguay	2023	1	0
Uruguay	2024	1 (Note: Includes a Non-FIFA friendly played against the Basque Country, which is counted as an official match by the Uruguayan Football Association.)	0
Uruguay	2025	1	0
Total		3	0

== Honours ==
Nacional U20

- U-20 Copa Libertadores: 2018

Sporting CP

- Primeira Liga: 2023–24, 2024–25
- Taça de Portugal: 2024–25

Uruguay U20

- South American Games silver medal: 2018

Uruguay

- Copa América third place: 2024
