= Paulinho (footballer, born November 1992) =

Portuguese footballer (born 1992)

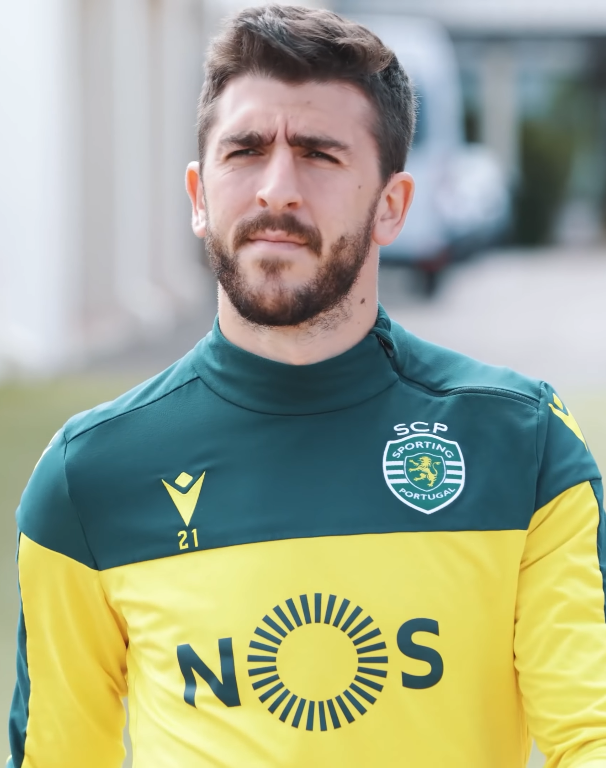
- Paulinho with Sporting CP in 2021

Personal information
- Full name: João Paulo Dias Fernandes
- Date of birth: 9 November 1992 (age 34)
- Place of birth: Barcelos, Portugal
- Height: 1.87 m (6 ft 2 in)
- Position: Striker

Team information
- Current team: Toluca
- Number: 26

Youth career
- 2001–2011: Santa Maria

Senior career*
Years	Team	Apps	(Gls)
2010–2012	Santa Maria	39	(9)
2012–2013	Trofense	35	(11)
2013–2017	Gil Vicente	112	(28)
2017–2021	Braga	100	(38)
2021–2024	Sporting CP	96	(34)
2024–	Toluca	78	(51)

International career^{‡}
2012	Portugal U21	1	(0)
2020–	Portugal	5	(2)
- * Club domestic league appearances and goals as of 05:50, 10 October 2026 (UTC) ‡ National team caps and goals as of 01:05, 1 April 2026 (UTC)

João Paulo Dias Fernandes (born 9 November 1992), commonly known as Paulinho, is a Portuguese professional footballer who plays for Liga MX club Toluca and the Portugal national team as a striker.

He amassed Primeira Liga totals of 230 matches and 74 goals over nine seasons, representing Gil Vicente, Braga and Sporting CP (for whom he signed in January 2021 for €16 million), winning the 2019–20 Taça da Liga and the 2020–21 Taça de Portugal with the second of those clubs and the 2021 and 2024 national championships and the 2021 Supertaça Cândido de Oliveira with the third. In the Segunda Liga, he played with Trofense and Gil. He joined Liga MX side Toluca in June 2024, where he won several team and individual honours, most notably the Balón de Oro for best player.

Paulinho won his first cap for Portugal in 2020, scoring twice in his first appearance.

== Club career ==
=== Trofense ===
Born in Barcelos, Braga District, Paulinho started playing with local amateurs Santa Maria. In 2012 he signed with Segunda Liga club Trofense, making his debut as a professional on 29 July by playing the full 90 minutes in a 5–1 away loss against Aves in the group stage of the Taça da Liga. His maiden appearance in the league took place on 12 August, in a 2–0 defeat to the same opponent where he also started.

=== Gil Vicente ===
In the 2013 off-season, after scoring 11 goals during the season, Paulinho moved to the Primeira Liga with Gil Vicente. He made his debut in the competition on 18 August, coming on as a 49th-minute substitute in a 2–0 home win over Académica de Coimbra. He netted his first goal on 24 November of the same year, but in a 3–2 loss at Marítimo.

During the 2016–17 campaign, with the team again in the second tier, Paulinho scored a career-best 19 times for a runner-up position in the individual charts.

=== Braga ===
On 24 May 2017, Paulinho moved to Braga on a four-year contract. He finished his first year as team top scorer at 13 – 17 across all competitions – helping them to qualify for the group phase of the UEFA Europa League after ranking fourth in the league.

Paulinho was the top scorer of the 2018–19 Taça da Liga, netting braces in group stage wins against Nacional (5–0 at home) and Vitória de Setúbal (4–0 away). In the next year's edition he scored twice for the winners, including a last-minute winner over Sporting CP in the semi-finals. On the league front, he set a new personal best in the top flight, including a hat-trick in a 5–1 away rout of Paços de Ferreira on 10 July 2020.

On 26 November 2020, Paulinho scored in a 3–3 home draw with Leicester City in the Europa League group stage; in doing so, he beat Alan's record of 11 European goals for Braga. He scored all of his side's goals in a 3–1 victory against Estoril on 17 December to make the League Cup semi-finals.

=== Sporting CP ===
On 1 February 2021, Paulinho joined Sporting on a deal running until June 2025 for a club-record €16 million fee, reuniting with former Braga manager Ruben Amorim; as part of the arrangement, Cristian Borja and Andraž Šporar moved in the opposite direction. On 11 May, his 36th-minute goal was the only of the home fixture against Boavista, and the club won the domestic league for the first time in 19 years.

Paulinho scored three times in the group stage of the 2021–22 UEFA Champions League, helping his team to progress as runners-up. On 29 December 2021, he netted a hat-trick in a 3–2 home win over Portimonense in the domestic league.

Paulinho topped the scoring charts of the 2022–23 League Cup with eight goals. However, in the 2–0 final loss to Porto, he was sent off for two quick yellow cards, being later handed a three-match suspension for insulting the refereeing team.

In the 2023–24 season, Paulinho won his second league with Sporting. He totalled 21 goals in all competitions, only trailing in the squad Viktor Gyökeres (who also led all players overall) who had 43.

=== Toluca ===
On 21 June 2024, Paulinho agreed to a three-year contract at Liga MX side Toluca with the option of a further season, for a €7,75 million fee plus €250,000 in add-ons. He scored twice in his second match, helping the hosts to defeat Juárez 3–2. He finished the season as top scorer in both the Apertura and Clausura with a combined total of 27 goals, while his team finished second in the former tournament before being eliminated in the quarter-finals. In the latter, his 12 goals saw them top the table and later be crowned champions by defeating América 2–0 in the final; for his displays, he received the Balón de Oro as both Player of the Year and Best Forward.

== International career ==
Paulinho won his only cap for the Portugal under-21 team on 14 November 2012, playing the last 18 minutes of the 3–2 friendly defeat of Scotland. In May 2018, he was included by full side manager Fernando Santos in a preliminary 35-man squad for the upcoming edition of the FIFA World Cup in Russia, but did not make the final cut.

On 11 November 2020, Paulinho made his senior debut in a home exhibition against Andorra, scoring twice in a 7–0 win. In October 2022, he was one of 55 players pre-selected for the 2022 World Cup in Qatar.

On 22 March 2026, after more than five years away from the national team, Paulinho was called up ahead of friendlies with Mexico and the United States as a replacement for the injured Rafael Leão and Rodrigo Mora. He took the field in the 64th minute of the former, a 0–0 draw in the country where he played his professional football at.

== Career statistics ==
=== Club ===
As of match played 15 September 2026

Appearances and goals by club, season and competition
Club	Season	League			National cup (Note: Includes Taça de Portugal)		League cup (Note: Includes Taça da Liga)		Continental		Other		Total	
Club	Season	Division	Apps	Goals	Apps	Goals	Apps	Goals	Apps	Goals	Apps	Goals	Apps	Goals
Santa Maria	2010–11	Terceira Divisão	8	1	2	0	—		—		—		10	1
Santa Maria	2011–12	Terceira Divisão	31	8	4	2	—		—		—		35	10
Santa Maria	Total		39	9	6	2	—		—		—		45	11
Trofense	2012–13	Segunda Liga	35	11	0	0	3	0	—		—		38	11
Gil Vicente	2013–14	Primeira Liga	20	1	3	0	5	2	—		—		28	3
Gil Vicente	2014–15	Primeira Liga	14	1	2	0	2	0	—		—		18	1
Gil Vicente	2015–16	LigaPro	42	7	4	2	1	0	—		—		47	9
Gil Vicente	2016–17	LigaPro	36	19	3	1	2	0	—		—		41	20
Gil Vicente	Total		112	28	12	3	10	2	—		—		134	33
Braga	2017–18	Primeira Liga	30	13	2	0	2	1	9 (Note: Appearances in UEFA Europa League)	3	—		43	17
Braga	2018–19	Primeira Liga	29	5	6	2	3	4	0	0	—		38	11
Braga	2019–20	Primeira Liga	29	17	3	0	4	2	12	6	—		48	25
Braga	2020–21	Primeira Liga	12	3	3	1	3	3	6	3	—		24	10
Braga	Total		100	38	14	3	12	10	27	12	—		153	63
Sporting CP	2020–21	Primeira Liga	14	3	—		—		—		—		14	3
Sporting CP	2021–22	Primeira Liga	29	11	5	0	3	0	8 (Note: Appearances in UEFA Champions League)	3	1 (Note: Appearance in Supertaça Cândido de Oliveira)	0	46	14
Sporting CP	2022–23	Primeira Liga	22	5	1	0	6	8	9 (Note: Five appearances and one goal in UEFA Champions League, four appearances and one goal in UEFA Europa League)	2	—		38	15
Sporting CP	2023–24	Primeira Liga	31	15	6	4	3	1	7	1	—		47	21
Sporting CP	Total		96	34	12	4	12	9	24	6	1	0	145	53
Toluca	2024–25	Liga MX	39	27	—		—		—		3 (Note: Appearances in Leagues Cup)	1	42	28
Toluca	2025–26	Liga MX	34	21	—		—		7 (Note: Appearances in CONCACAF Champions Cup)	8	6 (Note: One appearance and one goal in Campeón de Campeones, four appearances and four goals in Leagues Cup, one appearance in Campeones Cup)	5	47	34
Toluca	2026–27	Liga MX	2	1	—		—		0	0	1 (Note: Appearance in Leagues Cup)	0	3	1
Toluca	Total		75	49	—		—		7	8	10	6	92	63
Career total			457	169	44	12	37	21	58	26	11	6	607	234

=== International ===
As of match played 31 March 2026

Appearances and goals by national team and year
National team	Year	Apps	Goals
Portugal	2020	3	2
Portugal	2021	0	0
Portugal	2022	0	0
Portugal	2023	0	0
Portugal	2024	0	0
Portugal	2025	0	0
Portugal	2026	2	0
Total		5	2

Scores and results list Portugal's goal tally first, score column indicates score after each Paulinho goal.

List of international goals scored by Paulinho
No.	Date	Venue	Cap	Opponent	Score	Result	Competition
1	11 November 2020	Estádio da Luz, Lisbon, Portugal	1	Andorra	2–0	7–0	Friendly
2	11 November 2020	Estádio da Luz, Lisbon, Portugal	1	Andorra	4–0	7–0	Friendly

== Honours ==
Braga

- Taça de Portugal: 2020–21
- Taça da Liga: 2019–20

Sporting CP

- Primeira Liga: 2020–21, 2023–24
- Taça da Liga: 2021–22
- Supertaça Cândido de Oliveira: 2021

Toluca

- Liga MX: Clausura 2025, Apertura 2025
- Campeón de Campeones: 2025
- Campeones Cup: 2025
- CONCACAF Champions Cup: 2026
- Leagues Cup: 2026

Individual

- Primeira Liga Team of the Year: 2019–20
- Taça da Liga top scorer: 2022–23
- Liga MX Golden Boot: Apertura 2024, Clausura 2025 (shared), Apertura 2025 (shared)
- Liga MX Best XI: Apertura 2024, Clausura 2025, Apertura 2025
- Liga MX Balón de Oro: 2024–25
- Liga MX Best Forward: 2024–25
- CONCACAF Champions Cup Best Player: 2026
- CONCACAF Champions Cup Golden Boot: 2026
- CONCACAF Champions Cup Best XI: 2026
