= Chico Lamba =

Portuguese footballer

Personal information
- Full name: Chico Faria Camará Lamba
- Date of birth: 10 March 2003 (age 23)
- Place of birth: Bissau, Guinea-Bissau
- Height: 1.89 m (6 ft 2 in)
- Position: Centre-back

Team information
- Current team: Saint-Étienne
- Number: 15

Youth career
- 2013–2014: CF Benfica
- 2014–2020: Sporting CP

Senior career*
Years	Team	Apps	(Gls)
2020–2024	Sporting CP B	62	(3)
2022–2024	Sporting CP	1	(0)
2024–2025	Arouca	26	(1)
2025–	Saint-Étienne	14	(0)

International career^{‡}
2018	Portugal U16	1	(0)
2021	Portugal U18	2	(0)
2021–2022	Portugal U19	8	(1)
2024–2025	Portugal U21	5	(0)
- * Club domestic league appearances and goals as of 11 May 2026 ‡ National team caps and goals as of 21 June 2025

Chico Faria Camará Lamba (born 10 March 2003) is a professional footballer who plays as a centre-back for Ligue 2 club Saint-Étienne. Born in Guinea-Bissau, he is a youth international for Portugal.

== Club career ==
Lamba is a youth product of CF Benfica, and moved to Sporting CP's youth academy at the age of 10 in 2014. In October 2020, he was integrated with Sporting CP B. In the summer of 2022, he started training with the senior team of Sporting. On 7 July 2022, he extended his contract with the club until 2024. He made his professional debut with Sporting as a half-time substitute in a 3–1 Primeira Liga win over Casa Pia on 22 October 2022.

On 12 June 2024, it was announced that Lamba would join Primeira Liga side Arouca on a permanent deal on 1 July, signing a three-year contract.

On 7 July 2025, Lamba signed a four-year contract with Saint-Étienne in French Ligue 2.

== International career ==
Lamba was born in Guinea-Bissau and moved to Portugal at a young age, and holds dual citizenship. He is a youth international for Portugal. He was the starting centre-back for Portugal at the 2025 UEFA European Under-21 Championship, where they reached quarterfinals.
