= Pedro Gonçalves =

Portuguese footballer (born 1998)

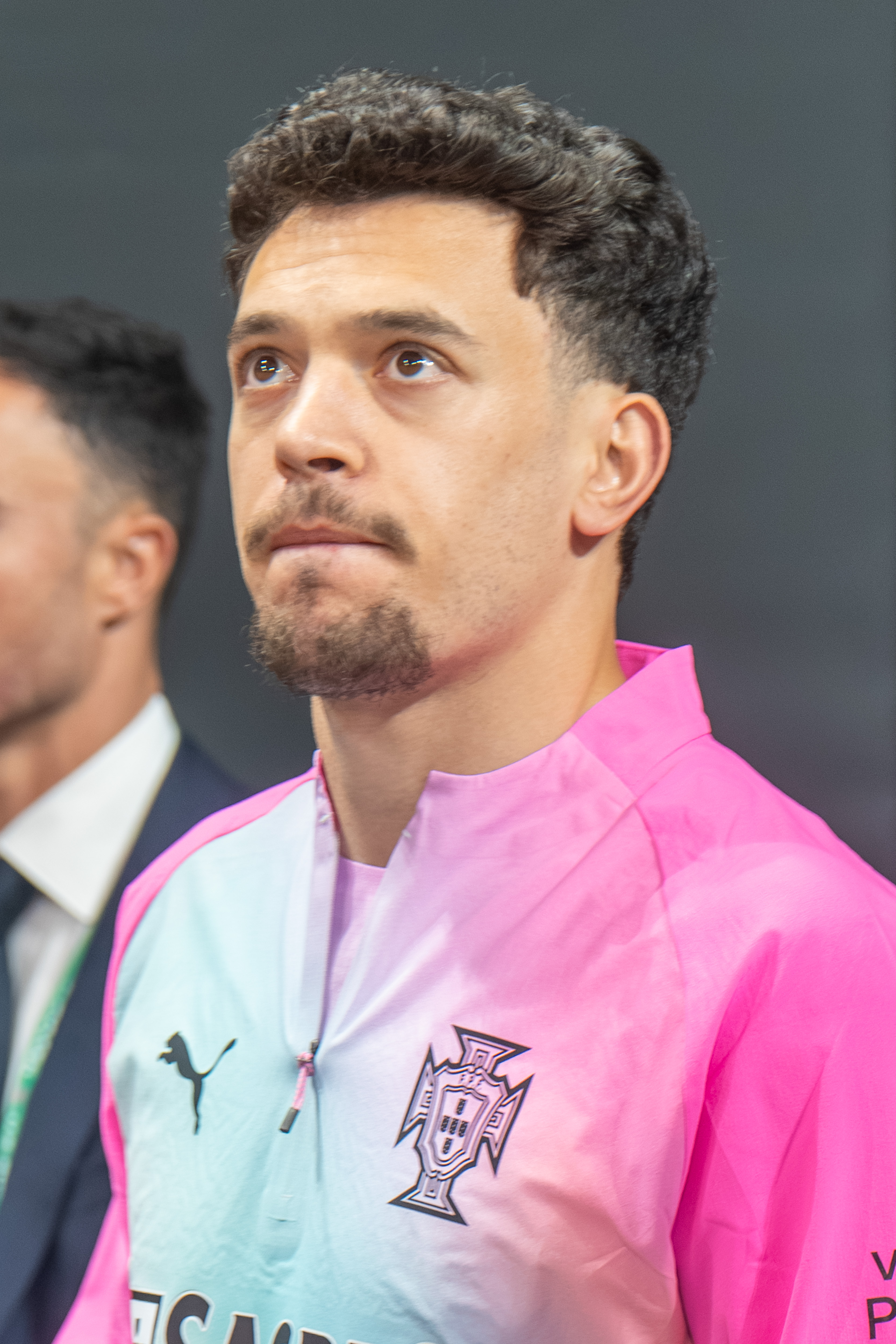
- Gonçalves with Portugal in 2026

Personal information
- Full name: Pedro António Pereira Gonçalves
- Date of birth: 28 June 1998 (age 28)
- Place of birth: Vidago, Portugal
- Height: 1.73 m (5 ft 8 in)
- Positions: Attacking midfielder; winger

Team information
- Current team: Fiorentina (on loan from Sporting CP)
- Number: 28

Youth career
- 2006–2008: Vidago
- 2008–2010: Chaves
- 2010–2015: Braga
- 2015–2017: Valencia
- 2017–2018: Wolverhampton Wanderers

Senior career*
Years	Team	Apps	(Gls)
2018–2019	Wolverhampton Wanderers	0	(0)
2019–2020	Famalicão	33	(5)
2020–	Sporting CP	165	(75)
2026–	→ Fiorentina (loan)	6	(0)

International career^{‡}
2016	Portugal U18	2	(0)
2018	Portugal U20	2	(0)
2020–2021	Portugal U21	8	(2)
2021–	Portugal	4	(0)
Medal record
Men's football
Representing Portugal
UEFA Nations League
Winner	2025 Germany
UEFA European Under-21 Championship
Runner-up	2021 Hungary–Slovenia
- * Club domestic league appearances and goals as of 16:55, 18 October 2026 (UTC) ‡ National team caps and goals as of 6 September 2025

Pedro António Pereira Gonçalves (Portuguese pronunciation: [ˈpeðɾu ɣõˈsalvɨʃ]; (Note: In isolation, Gonçalves is pronounced [ɡõˈsalvɨʃ].) born 28 June 1998), also known as Pote, is a Portuguese professional footballer who plays as an attacking midfielder or winger for Serie A club Fiorentina, on loan from Primeira Liga club Sporting CP, and the Portugal national team.

Gonçalves started his career with Wolverhampton Wanderers, before signing for newly promoted Primeira Liga side Famalicão in 2019. After being named Primeira Liga's Best Young Player of the Year in 2020, he signed for fellow Primeira Liga side Sporting CP. There, he won the Bola de Prata for being the top scorer in the Primeira Liga, and was the league's top assist provider in consecutive seasons in 2023 and 2024.

He is a former Portugal youth international, representing his country at under-18, under-20 and under-21 levels. He made his senior international debut in 2021, being chosen in Portugal's squad for the UEFA Euro 2020.

== Early life ==
Born in the village of Vidago, a spa town in Chaves, Vila Real District, Gonçalves' father died a month after his birth. He started his career at Vidago at the age of 8, where his mother worked as the kit provider. He was integrated into the club's youth team by vice president José Sousa, after being a regular presence around the premises. Due to being chubby and short during his childhood, he earned the nickname "Potinho" and later "Pote".

== Club career ==
=== Early career ===
Following his performances in Vidago, Gonçalves caught the attention of his hometown club Chaves, joining the club's youth system at the age of 11. Two years later, he was taken to S.C. Braga by Jorge Pires, whose father was a friend of Pedro's father, usually travelling one hour for each training session.

After passing his trial aged 13, Gonçalves moved to the city of Braga, living in the house of a lady with two other teammates. He stayed in the youth system for five years, but left the club following the departure of his manager Agostinho Oliveira, whose contract was not renewed. Upon learning of the situation, Valencia's coach Nuno Espírito Santo offered him a professional contract, integrating him into the club's youth teams, with Pedro easily adapting to his new life in Spain and becoming club captain.

=== Wolverhampton Wanderers ===
In July 2017, Gonçalves signed a two-year contract with English club Wolverhampton Wanderers. He made his only competitive appearance for the first team on 28 August 2018, in a 2–0 away win against Sheffield Wednesday in the second round of the EFL Cup, coming on as a 62nd-minute substitute for Elliot Watt.

=== Famalicão ===
Gonçalves returned to Portugal on 2 July 2019, joining newly promoted Famalicão on a five-year deal, citing homesickness during his time in England, as one of the reasons for his transfer. He made his Primeira Liga debut on 10 August, playing the entire 2–0 victory at Santa Clara. His first goal was scored one month later, helping the hosts beat Paços de Ferreira in a 4–2 victory. During his spell at the Estádio Municipal 22 de Junho, Gonçalves established himself as a regular at midfield and made a significant contribution to the team's strong start to the season, becoming club captain in January 2020, scoring seven times and providing eight assists in all competitions from 40 appearances, helping the club to a record sixth-place finish in the league. Following his good performance for Famalicão, during the season, he was named the Primeira Liga's Best Young Player of the Year.

=== Sporting CP ===
==== 2020–21: First Primeira Liga title and league top scorer ====
On 18 August 2020, Gonçalves signed a five-year contract with Sporting CP of the same league, for a fee of €6.5 million for half of his economic rights. On 1 October, he made his debut for the club in a 4–1 home loss against LASK in the play-off round of the UEFA Europa League, as a 67th-minute substitute for Luciano Vietto. With two goals in a 4–0 win over Tondela on 1 November, he reached five goals in his first six league games, second-best in the league. On 5 December, he scored and was sent off in a 2–2 draw at his previous club; this was his tenth goal over six consecutive matches.

On 15 May 2021, Gonçalves scored two goals in a 4–3 away loss against Benfica in the Lisbon derby, marking the first and only defeat for Sporting in the league. Four days later, he scored a hat-trick in a 5–1 home thrashing of Marítimo, taking his tally up to 23 goals, finishing as the top scorer in the league, being awarded the Bola de Prata, while also surpassing Benfica's Haris Seferovic by one goal to win the individual accolade and becoming the first national player since Domingos Paciência in 1996 to do so. On 8 July, Gonçalves was awarded the Primeira Liga's Young Player of the Year for the second consecutive year.

==== 2021–22: Second Taça da Liga ====
On 31 July, Gonçalves scored a goal in the 2–1 defeat of Braga in the Supertaça Cândido de Oliveira, and was named man of the match. From 6 August until 14 August, he scored three goals in two consecutive league matches in a 3–0 home victory over against newly promoted side Vizela, and in a 2–1 away victory against Braga, leading him to be named the Primeira Liga's Midfielder of the Month in August. At the end of the month, he injured his left foot, causing him to be sidelined for almost two months. On 29 October, he agreed to a contract extension, tying him to the club until 2026 and increasing his buyout clause from €60 million to €80 million.

On 3 November, he scored his first two UEFA Champions League goals in a 4–0 home group stage victory against Beşiktaş, and was named man of the match. He repeated the feat three weeks later in a 3–1 win against Borussia Dortmund, ensuring the team's qualification to the round of sixteen for the first time since the 2008–09 season. In doing so, he became the second Portuguese player after Cristiano Ronaldo to score two or more in consecutive Champions League matches.

His second season would be marked by continuous injuries resulted in Gonçalves performances declining, finishing the season appearing in 31 games, scoring 14 goals and providing 7 assists, which resulted in him being the highest contributor of his team that season.

==== 2022–25: Primeira Liga's top assist provider and consecutive league titles ====
Gonçalves started the season by scoring in a 3–3 away draw to Braga on 7 August, followed by a brace against Rio Ave a week later. He quickly regained his form from last season, scoring three goals and providing three assists in September, despite his team poor run of form, sometimes filling as a number 8, when his teammates were sidelined with an injury.

On 16 March 2023, he scored an equalizer from almost half-way pitch in a 1–1 away draw against Arsenal, with his team progressing to the UEFA Europa League quarter-finals, beating by penalty shootout after a 3–3 aggregate score in London. Gonçalves' goal was later considered the Best Goal of the 2022–23 edition of the competition. He ended the season as the club's top scorer with 20 goals, and the Primeira Liga's top assist provider with 11 assists in total.

Ahead of the 2023–24 season, Sporting handed Gonçalves the number 8 shirt, who had previously belonged to Matheus Nunes and Bruno Fernandes. Sporting also acquired 40 of the 50% of Gonçalves' economic still held by Famalicão, for a fee of €7.7 million. On 19 December, he closed the 2–0 league victory at home to rivals Porto, netting his first goal against the opposition and as a result allowing his side to overtake rivals Benfica at the top of the Primeira Liga table. Over the following months, Gonçalves formed an attacking trio with Francisco Trincão and striker Viktor Gyökeres, that led Sporting mathematically securing their 20th Primeira Liga title, following Benfica's defeat to Famalicão on 5 May, with Gonçalves registering 12 assists, finishing as the league's top assist provider for the second consecutive season.

The following season, he spent most of the season injured, only playing eight league matches, however, on 17 May, he scored Sporting's first goal in a 2–0 victory over Vitória de Guimarães as Sporting won the league for the second consecutive season, their first time in 71 years; this was Gonçalves' third Primeira League title. On 25 May, Gonçalves helped Sporting win the Taça de Portugal final against Benfica, by the score of 3–1, winning their first domestic double since the 2001–02 season.

==== Loan to Fiorentina ====
On 1 September 2026, Gonçalves joined Serie A side Fiorentina on loan.

== International career ==
=== Youth ===
Gonçalves began his international career with under-18 level in 2016. In March 2018, he was called up to the under-20 level to play two friendlies, against Germany and England.

He earned his first cap for Portugal at under-21 level on 4 September 2020, in a 4–0 win in Cyprus for the 2021 UEFA European Championship qualifiers. On 13 October, in another away fixture for the same competition, he scored twice against Gibraltar in a 3–0 away victory.

On 15 March 2021, Gonçalves was selected by Rui Jorge for his 2021 UEFA European Under-21 Championship squad.

=== Senior ===
Having already participated in the first stage of the under-21 finals, in May 2021 Gonçalves was selected by Fernando Santos for his UEFA Euro 2020 squad due to the delay caused by the COVID-19 pandemic. He made his full debut the following 4 June, playing the second half of the 0–0 friendly draw with Spain in Madrid. Gonçalves ended up not playing for Portugal in the Euro 2020 in an eventual round-of-16 exit.

In October 2022, he was named in Portugal's preliminary 55-man squad for the 2022 FIFA World Cup in Qatar, but did not make the final cut.

== Style of play ==
During his time with Famalicão, Gonçalves played predominantly as a central midfielder at a deeper position. Under manager Ruben Amorim at Sporting CP, Gonçalves was deployed as an attacking midfielder or a right winger in the team's 3–4–2–1 or 3–4–3 formations, during which, he is allowed the freedom to fluidly move, coming infield to get close to the central striker or pulling off to the edge of the box. Gonçalves also has good ball control and balance, which allows him to roam around the attacking areas of the pitch. While playing as a false 9, Gonçalves contributes to the possession of his team dropping deep to pick up possession and when receiving the ball in these half-spaces, his spatial awareness allows him to reliably transfer the ball to a dangerous area of the pitch.

== Career statistics ==
=== Club ===
As of match played 18 October 2026

Appearances and goals by club, season and competition
Club	Season	League			National cup (Note: Includes Taça de Portugal, Coppa Italia)		League cup (Note: Includes EFL Cup, Taça da Liga)		Europe		Other		Total	
Club	Season	Division	Apps	Goals	Apps	Goals	Apps	Goals	Apps	Goals	Apps	Goals	Apps	Goals
Wolverhampton Wanderers	2017–18	Championship	0	0	0	0	0	0	—		—		0	0
Wolverhampton Wanderers	2018–19	Premier League	0	0	0	0	1	0	—		—		1	0
Wolverhampton Wanderers	Total		0	0	0	0	1	0	—		—		1	0
Famalicão	2019–20	Primeira Liga	33	5	6	2	1	0	—		—		40	7
Sporting CP	2020–21	Primeira Liga	32	23	1	0	3	0	1 (Note: Appearance(s) in UEFA Europa League)	0	—		37	23
Sporting CP	2021–22	Primeira Liga	27	8	4	2	4	0	5 (Note: Appearances in UEFA Champions League)	4	1 (Note: Appearance in Supertaça Cândido de Oliveira)	1	41	15
Sporting CP	2022–23	Primeira Liga	33	15	1	0	6	2	11 (Note: Five appearances in UEFA Champions League, six appearances and three goals in UEFA Europa League)	3	—		51	20
Sporting CP	2023–24	Primeira Liga	32	11	5	4	3	0	9	3	—		49	18
Sporting CP	2024–25	Primeira Liga	14	5	2	0	0	0	3	0	1	1	20	6
Sporting CP	2025–26	Primeira Liga	27	13	5	1	0	0	8	1	1	0	41	15
Sporting CP	Total		165	75	18	7	16	2	37	11	3	2	239	97
Fiorentina (loan)	2026–27	Serie A	6	0	2	2	—		—		—		8	2
Career total			204	80	26	11	18	2	37	11	3	2	288	106

=== International ===
As of match played 6 September 2025

Appearances and goals by national team and year
National team	Year	Apps	Goals
Portugal	2021	2	0
Portugal	2022	0	0
Portugal	2023	0	0
Portugal	2024	1	0
Portugal	2025	1	0
Total		4	0

== Honours ==
Sporting CP

- Primeira Liga: 2020–21, 2023–24, 2024–25
- Taça de Portugal: 2024–25
- Taça da Liga: 2020–21, 2021–22
- Supertaça Cândido de Oliveira: 2021

Portugal

- UEFA Nations League: 2024–25

Individual

- Primeira Liga Best Young Player of the Year: 2019–20, 2020–21
- Primeira Liga top scorer: 2020–21
- Primeira Liga Team of the Year: 2019–20, 2020–21, 2023–24
- Primeira Liga top assist provider: 2022–23, 2023–24
- UEFA Europa League Goal of the Season: 2022–23
- Primeira Liga Midfielder of the Month: April 2024, August, September/October 2025,
