= Jerry St. Juste =

Dutch footballer (born 1996)

Jeremiah St. Juste
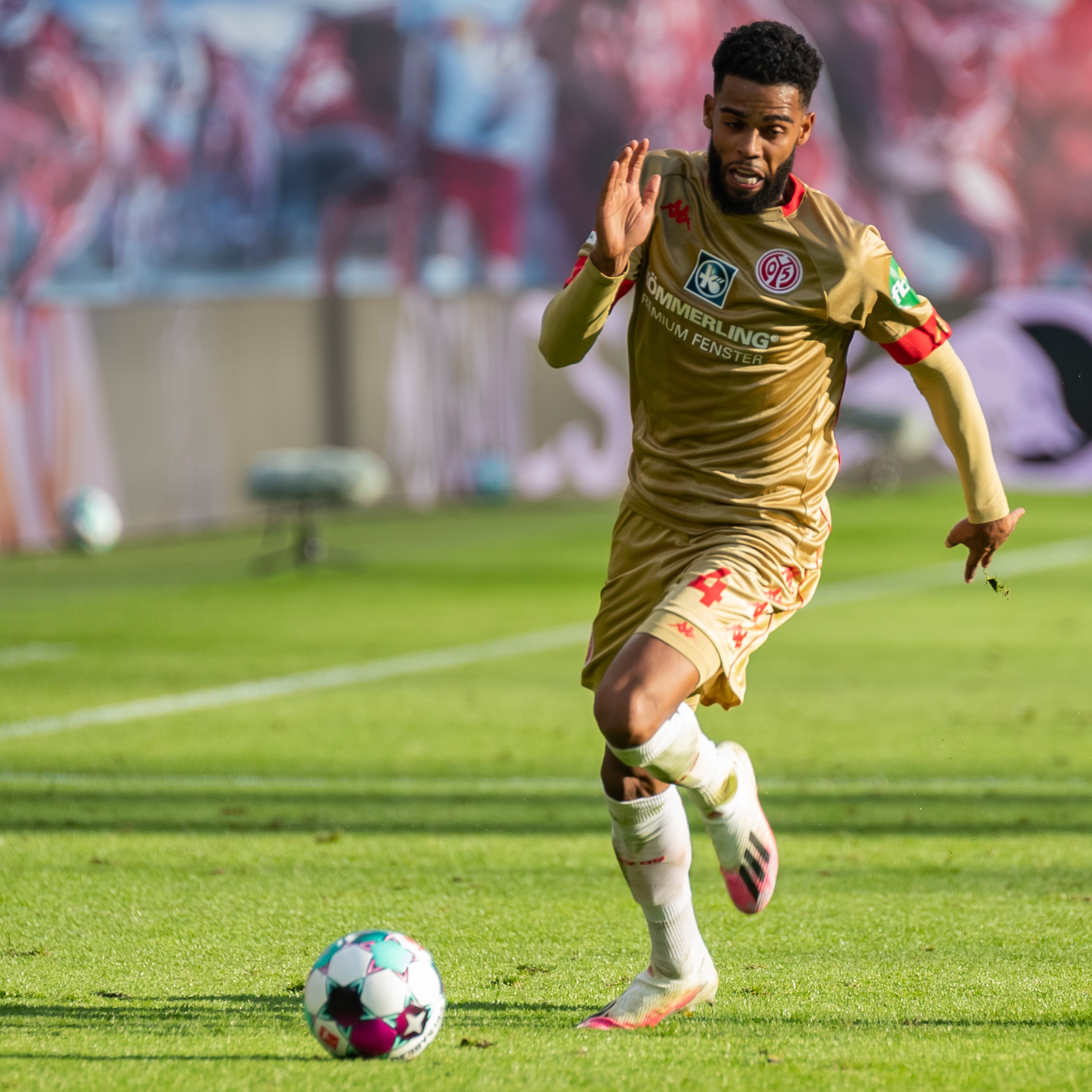
- St. Juste with Mainz 05 in 2020

Personal information
- Full name: Jeremiah Israël St. Juste
- Date of birth: 19 October 1996 (age 30)
- Place of birth: Groningen, Netherlands
- Height: 1.86 m (6 ft 1 in)
- Position: Centre-back

Team information
- Current team: Feyenoord
- Number: 6

Youth career
- 2002-2007: SV Marum
- 2007–2015: Heerenveen

Senior career*
Years	Team	Apps	(Gls)
2015–2017	Heerenveen	64	(3)
2017–2019	Feyenoord	39	(5)
2019–2022	Mainz 05	65	(3)
2022–2026	Sporting CP	46	(1)
2026–	Feyenoord	14	(0)

International career
2013	Netherlands U18	3	(0)
2014	Netherlands U19	2	(0)
2015–2016	Netherlands U20	3	(0)
2016–2018	Netherlands U21	9	(1)
- * Club domestic league appearances and goals as of 25 October 2026

Jeremiah Israël "Jerry" St. Juste (born 19 October 1996) is a Dutch professional footballer who plays as a centre-back for Eredivisie club Feyenoord.

== Early life ==
St. Juste was born in Groningen to a Dutch mother and a Kittitian father. He grew up with three siblings. His brother Benjamin is a former Heerenveen and Groningen youth player, and has played futsal for VV Pelikaan. His other brother Yoshua plays futsal for the Netherlands national futsal team. His sister Naomi works as a fashion model and television actress in the Netherlands.

== Club career ==
=== Heerenveen ===
St. Juste started his career at SV Marum. In the summer of 2007, he joined SC Heerenveen's reserve team.

He made his Eredivisie debut on 24 January 2015 against Vitesse. He replaced Joost van Aken in injury time in a 4–1 home win. On 16 January 2016, he scored first Eredivisie goal in a 5–2 away defeat against Zwolle.

=== Feyenoord ===
St. Juste moved to Feyenoord on 18 July 2017 on a four-year deal. He made his debut for the club on 9 September 2017 in a match against Heracles Almelo. Later that year, on 17 December, he scored his first goal in a 7–0 away victory over Sparta Rotterdam in the Rotterdam derby.

=== Mainz 05 ===
On 7 August 2019, Feyenoord announced on their website St. Juste was moving to Mainz on a four-year contract for an undisclosed fee. A month later, on 14 September, he scored his inaugural Bundesliga goal in the 88th minute of a 2–1 victory over Hertha BSC.

=== Sporting CP ===
On 11 May 2022, it was confirmed that St. Juste would sign for Portuguese club Sporting CP at the beginning of the 2022–23 season. The deal was worth a reported €9.5 million. Later that year, on 2 September, he scored his first Primeira Liga goal in a 2–0 away win over Estoril. The next season, St. Juste had rumors of interest from Liverpool after becoming a frequent starter for Ruben Amorim.

In the 2024 Taça de Portugal final, he scored the first goal for his club against FC Porto, before being sent off in the first half, in a match which ended in a 2–1 defeat after extra time.

At the start of the 2025–26 season, after being considered surplus to requirements by manager Rui Borges and allegedly rejecting arranged transfers to Osasuna and Union Berlin, St. Juste was relegated to Sporting's B team.

=== Return to Feyenoord ===
On 22 January 2026, St. Juste left Sporting CP and returned to Feyenoord on a free transfer, signing a contract until June 2027, with an option for a further year.

== International career ==
St. Juste was called up for the Netherlands U21 national team for qualifiers for the 2017 UEFA European Under-21 Championship in Poland. He is also eligible to play for the Saint Kitts and Nevis national team at senior level.

St. Juste was called up to the senior Netherlands squad in March 2021.

== Career statistics ==
As of match played 25 October 2026

Appearances and goals by club, season and competition
Club	Season	League			National cup (Note: Includes KNVB Cup, DFB-Pokal, Taça de Portugal)		League cup (Note: Includes Taça da Liga)		Continental		Other		Total	
Club	Season	Division	Apps	Goals	Apps	Goals	Apps	Goals	Apps	Goals	Apps	Goals	Apps	Goals
Heerenveen	2014–15	Eredivisie	9	0	0	0	—		—		4	0	13	0
Heerenveen	2015–16	Eredivisie	28	1	3	0	—		—		—		31	1
Heerenveen	2016–17	Eredivisie	27	2	3	0	—		—		1	0	31	2
Heerenveen	Total		64	3	6	0	—		—		5	0	75	3
Feyenoord	2017–18	Eredivisie	15	2	3	0	—		5 (Note: Appearances in UEFA Champions League)	1	—		23	2
Feyenoord	2018–19	Eredivisie	23	3	2	0	—		0	0	1 (Note: Appearance in Johan Cruyff Shield)	0	26	3
Feyenoord	2019–20	Eredivisie	1	0	0	0	—		0	0	0	0	1	0
Feyenoord	Total		39	5	5	0	—		5	1	1	0	50	5
Mainz 05	2019–20	Bundesliga	25	2	1	0	—		—		—		26	2
Mainz 05	2020–21	Bundesliga	32	0	2	0	—		—		—		34	0
Mainz 05	2021–22	Bundesliga	8	1	1	0	—		—		—		9	1
Mainz 05	Total		65	3	4	0	—		—		—		69	3
Sporting CP	2022–23	Primeira Liga	21	1	0	0	2	0	9 (Note: Four appearances in UEFA Champions League, five appearances in UEFA Europa League)	0	—		32	1
Sporting CP	2023–24	Primeira Liga	11	0	4	1	1	0	4 (Note: Appearances in UEFA Europa League)	0	—		20	1
Sporting CP	2024–25	Primeira Liga	14	0	5	0	3	0	6	0	0	0	28	0
Sporting CP	Total		46	1	9	1	6	0	19	0	0	0	80	2
Feyenoord	2025–26	Eredivisie	6	0	—		—		—		—		6	0
Feyenoord	2026–27	Eredivisie	8	0	0	0	—		3	0	—		11	0
Feyenoord	Total		14	0	0	0	—		3	0	—		17	0
Career total			228	14	24	1	6	0	27	1	6	0	289	13

== Honours ==
Feyenoord

- KNVB Cup: 2017–18
- Johan Cruyff Shield: 2017, 2018

Sporting CP

- Primeira Liga: 2023–24, 2024–25
- Taça de Portugal: 2024–25
