= Mateo Tanlongo =

Argentine footballer (born 2003)

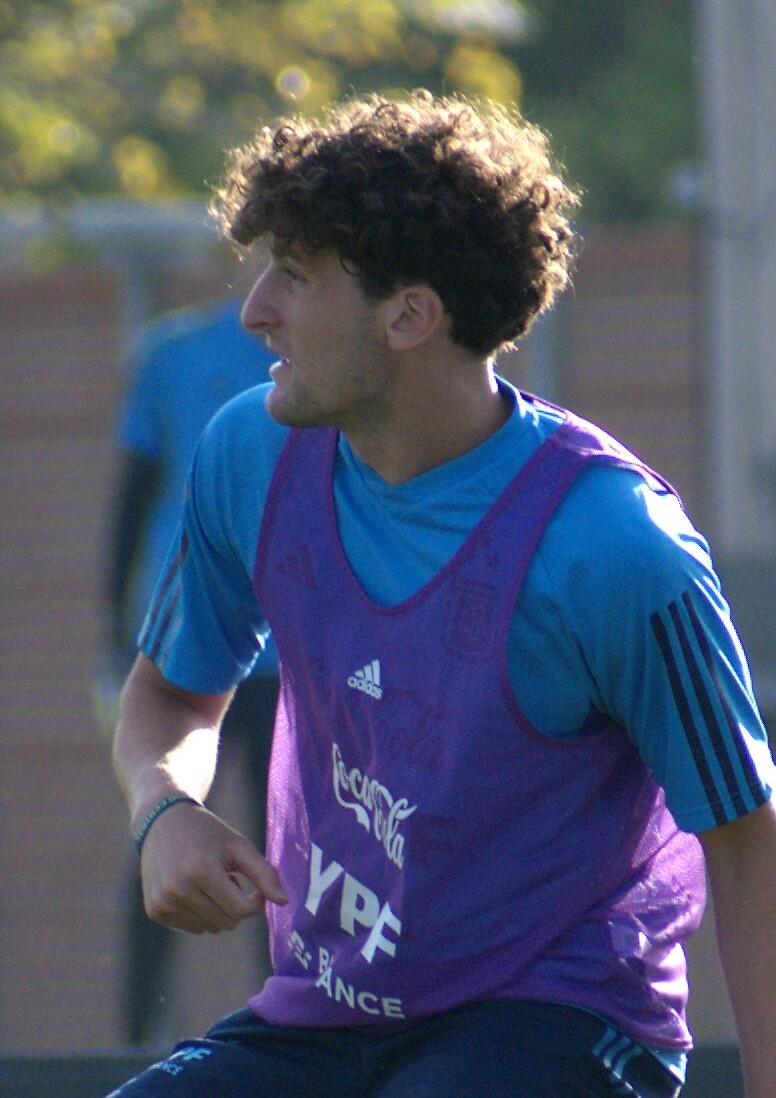
- Tanlongo in 2023

Personal information
- Full name: Mateo Tanlongo
- Date of birth: 12 August 2003 (age 23)
- Place of birth: Funes, Argentina
- Height: 1.77 m (5 ft 10 in)
- Position: Defensive midfielder

Team information
- Current team: Sporting CP B
- Number: 40

Youth career
- 2010–2021: Rosario Central

Senior career*
| Years | Team | Apps | (Gls) |
| 2021–2022 | Rosario Central | 25 | (0) |
| 2023– | Sporting CP | 9 | (0) |
| 2023–2024 | → Copenhagen (loan) | 0 | (0) |
| 2024 | → Rio Ave (loan) | 12 | (0) |
| 2024–2025 | → Pafos (loan) | 24 | (1) |
| 2026– | Sporting CP B | 10 | (1) |

International career^{‡}
| 2019 | Argentina U16 | | |
| 2022–2023 | Argentina U20 | 5 | (0) |
- * Club domestic league appearances and goals as of 20 June 2026 ‡ National team caps and goals as of 18:16, 1 February 2026 (UTC)

Mateo Tanlongo (born 12 August 2003) is an Argentine professional footballer who plays as a defensive midfielder for Liga Portugal 2 club Sporting CP B.

== Club career ==
=== Rosario Central ===
Tanlongo joined the youth system of Rosario Central in March 2010. After spending the next ten years in their academy, notably becoming the second youngest reserve debutant, the midfielder was promoted into the first-team by Kily González in mid-2020; having signed his first professional contract in June. A knee injury in October saw him miss two months. In January 2021, having gone unused on the bench versus Defensa y Justicia on 2 January, Tanlongo made his debut in the Copa de la Liga Profesional on 9 January in a loss away to Lanús; replacing Emmanuel Ojeda with seventeen minutes left, aged seventeen.

=== Sporting CP ===
On January 5, Tanlongo signed a contract until 2027 with Primeira Liga club Sporting CP, on a free transfer. His release clause was set at €60 million.

==== Loan to Copenhagen ====
On 1 September 2023, Danish Superliga club Copenhagen announced the signing of Tanlongo on a season-long loan from Sporting CP, with an optional buy-clause.

==== Loan to Rio Ave ====
On 11 January 2024, Tanlongo returned to Portugal by joining Primeira Liga club Rio Ave on loan until the end of the season.

==== Loan to Pafos ====
On 6 September 2024, Tanlogo joined Cypriot First Division club Pafos on a season-long loan with the option to buy.

== International career ==
In 2019, Tanlongo was selected by the Argentina U16s by manager Pablo Aimar.

== Personal life ==
Tanlongo was born in Argentina and is of Italian descent, holding dual citizenship.

== Career statistics ==
=== Club ===
As of match played 26 June 2025

Appearances and goals by club, season and competition
| Club | Season | League | | | National cup (Note: Includes Copa Argentina, Danish Cup, Cypriot Cup) | | League cup (Note: Includes Copa de la Liga Profesional, Taça da Liga) | | Continental | | Total | |
| Club | Season | Division | Apps | Goals | Apps | Goals | Apps | Goals | Apps | Goals | Apps | Goals |
|---|---|---|---|---|---|---|---|---|---|---|---|---|
| Rosario Central | 2020–21 (Note: Soccerway counts Copa de la Liga Profesional appearances as league appearances.) | Argentine Primera División | 1 | 0 | 0 | 0 | 0 | 0 | — | | 1 | 0 |
| Rosario Central | 2021 | Argentine Primera División | 4 | 0 | 0 | 0 | 1 | 0 | 0 | 0 | 5 | 0 |
| Rosario Central | 2022 | Argentine Primera División | 20 | 0 | 2 | 0 | 7 | 0 | — | | 29 | 0 |
| Rosario Central | Total | | 25 | 0 | 2 | 0 | 8 | 0 | 0 | 0 | 35 | 0 |
| Sporting CP | 2022–23 | Primeira Liga | 9 | 0 | 0 | 0 | 2 | 0 | 3 (Note: Appearance(s) in UEFA Europa League) | 0 | 14 | 0 |
| Copenhagen (loan) | 2023–24 | Danish Superliga | 0 | 0 | 1 | 0 | — | | 0 | 0 | 1 | 0 |
| Pafos (loan) | 2024–25 | Cypriot First Division | 24 | 1 | 4 | 1 | — | | — | | 28 | 2 |
| Career total | | | 58 | 1 | 7 | 1 | 10 | 0 | 3 | 0 | 78 | 2 |

== Honours ==
Pafos

- Cypriot First Division: 2024–25
