= Francisco Silva (footballer, born 2005) =

Portuguese footballer (born 2004)

Personal information
- Full name: Francisco Diogo Pereira da Silva
- Date of birth: 20 November 2005 (age 20)
- Place of birth: Felgueiras, Portugal
- Height: 1.91 m (6 ft 3 in)
- Position: Goalkeeper

Team information
- Current team: Sporting CP B
- Number: 99

Youth career
- 2014–2017: Cova de Piedade
- 2017–2024: Sporting CP

Senior career*
Years	Team	Apps	(Gls)
2024–	Sporting CP	1	(0)
2024–	Sporting CP B	14	(0)

International career^{‡}
2019	Portugal U15	1	(0)
2021	Portugal U16	3	(0)
2021–2022	Portugal U17	4	(0)
2022–2023	Portugal U18	6	(0)
2023–	Portugal U19	5	(0)
2024–	Portugal U20	5	(0)
- * Club domestic league appearances and goals as of 4 February 2026 ‡ National team caps and goals as of 16:05, 9 November 2025 (UTC)

Francisco Diogo Pereira da Silva (born 20 November 2005) is a Portuguese professional footballer who plays as a goalkeeper for Sporting CP B.

== Club career ==
Silva is a youth product of Cova de Piedade before moving to the academy of Sporting CP in 2017. On 2 6 November 2021, he signed his first professional contract with the club. In 2023, he was promoted to their U23 side. After a series of injuries to the first 2 goalkeepers for Sporting, Silva was promoted to the second goalkeeper for the last 2 matches in the 2023–24 Primeira Liga. He made his senior and professional debut with Sporting as a late substitute in a 3–0 Primeira Liga win over Chaves on 18 May 2024.

== International career ==
Pinto is a youth international for Portugal, having played up to the Portugal U19s.

== Personal life ==
Silva is the son of the Brazilian volleyball player Wagner Silva who played for Sporting CP volleyball.

== Honours ==
Sporting CP

- Primeira Liga: 2023–24
