= Diego Callai =

Brazilian footballer (born 2004)

Personal information
- Full name: Diego Callai Silva
- Date of birth: 18 July 2004 (age 22)
- Place of birth: Caxias do Sul, Brazil
- Height: 1.90 m (6 ft 3 in)
- Position: Goalkeeper

Team information
- Current team: Sporting CP
- Number: 41

Youth career
- 2013–2015: Juventude
- 2015–2021: Sporting CP

Senior career*
Years	Team	Apps	(Gls)
2021–	Sporting CP B	92	(0)
2021–	Sporting CP	0	(0)
2024	→ Feirense (loan)	11	(0)
- * Club domestic league appearances and goals as of 21:00, 16 May 2026 (UTC)

Diego Callai Silva (born 18 July 2004) is a Brazilian professional footballer who plays as a goalkeeper for Primeira Liga club Sporting CP.

== Club career ==
A youth product of the Brazilian club Juventude, Callai moved to the youth academy of Sporting CP in 2015. On 23 July 2020, he signed his first professional contract with Sporting and was promoted to Sporting CP B in 2021. In the summer of 2021, he joined the senior team during preseason and was promoted as their third goalkeeper. On 22 April 2022, he extended his contract with Sporting CP until 2027.

On 11 January 2024, Callai joined Feirense on loan in Liga Portugal 2.

On 12 December 2025, while starting regularly for Sporting B, competing in Liga Portugal 2, Callai extended his contract with the club until 2030, with his release clause being set at €80 million.

== Personal life ==
Callai is the son of the Brazilian former goalkeeper Diego Costa Silva. He holds Brazilian, Italian and Portuguese nationalities.

== Career statistics ==
As of match played 16 May 2026

Appearances and goals by club, season and competition
Club	Season	League			National cup		League cup		Continental		Other		Total	
Club	Season	Division	Apps	Goals	Apps	Goals	Apps	Goals	Apps	Goals	Apps	Goals	Apps	Goals
Sporting CP B	2021–22	Liga 3	18	0	—		—		—		—		18	0
Sporting CP B	2022–23	Liga 3	25	0	—		—		—		—		25	0
Sporting CP B	2023–24	Liga 3	12	0	—		—		—		—		12	0
Sporting CP B	2024–25	Liga 3	12	0	—		—		—		—		12	0
Sporting CP B	2025–26	Liga Portugal 2	25	0	—		—		—		—		25	0
Sporting CP B	Total		92	0	—		—		—		—		92	0
Sporting CP B	2022–23	Primeira Liga	0	0	0	0	0	0	0	0	—		0	0
Sporting CP B	2023–24	Primeira Liga	0	0	0	0	0	0	0	0	—		0	0
Sporting CP B	2024–25	Primeira Liga	0	0	0	0	0	0	0	0	—		0	0
Sporting CP B	2025–26	Primeira Liga	0	0	0	0	0	0	0	0	—		0	0
Sporting CP B	Total		0	0	0	0	0	0	0	0	—		92	0
Feirense (loan)	2023–24	Liga Portugal 2	11	0	—		—		—		0	0	11	0
Career total			103	0	0	0	0	0	0	0	0	0	103	0
