= José Marsà =

Spanish footballer (born 2002)

Personal information
- Full name: José Martínez Marsà
- Date of birth: 4 March 2002 (age 24)
- Place of birth: Esplugues de Llobregat, Spain
- Height: 1.83 m (6 ft 0 in)
- Position: Centre-back

Team information
- Current team: Mechelen
- Number: 3

Youth career
- 2008–2020: Barcelona

Senior career*
Years	Team	Apps	(Gls)
2020–2021	Barcelona B	13	(0)
2021–2023	Sporting CP B	24	(0)
2022–2023	Sporting CP	3	(0)
2023	→ Sporting Gijón (loan)	13	(0)
2023–2024	Andorra	30	(0)
2024–	Mechelen	70	(2)

International career^{‡}
2017–2018	Spain U17	7	(0)
2019–2020	Spain U18	5	(0)
- * Club domestic league appearances and goals as of 31 May 2026 ‡ National team caps and goals as of 18:05, 16 May 2022 (UTC)

José Martínez Marsà (born 4 March 2002) is a Spanish professional footballer who plays as a centre-back for Belgian Pro League club Mechelen.

== Club career ==
Born in Esplugues de Llobregat, Barcelona, Catalonia, Marsà was a youth product of La Masia. He began his senior career with Barcelona B in 2020. On 1 July 2021, he transferred to the Portuguese club Sporting CP, initially heading to their reserves.

Marsà made his professional debut with Sporting in a 4–0 Primeira Liga win over Santa Clara on 14 May 2022, coming on as a sub in the 79th minute. On 31 January 2023, he returned to Spain after being loaned to Segunda División side Sporting de Gijón for the remainder of the season.

On 3 August 2023, Marsà joined Segunda División club FC Andorra on a free transfer, signing a three-year contract; with Sporting CP keeping 50% of his economic rights.

After one season in the Spanish second flight, Marsà moved to Belgian Pro League club Mechelen in July 2024. He signed a three-year contract.

== International career ==
Marsà is a youth international for Spain, having represented their Spain U17s and U18s. He represented the Spain U17s at the 2019 FIFA U-17 World Cup.
