= 2019–20 Sporting CP season =

Sporting CP
2019–20 season
- President: Frederico Varandas
- Manager: Leonel Pontes (until 26 September); Silas (from 26 September until 4 March); Ruben Amorim (from 4 March)
- Stadium: Estádio José Alvalade
- Primeira Liga: 4th
- Taça de Portugal: Third round
- Taça da Liga: Semi-finals
- Supertaça Cândido de Oliveira: Runners-up
- UEFA Europa League: Round of 32
- Top goalscorer: League: Bruno Fernandes (8); All: Bruno Fernandes (Note: Left the club halfway through the season.) (15)
Home colours	Away colours	Third colours

The 2019–20 Sporting CP season was the club's 114th season in existence and 87th consecutive season in the top flight of Portuguese football. The season covered the period from 1 July 2019 to 25 July 2020.

== Players ==
=== Current squad ===
As of 30 January 2020

Note: Flags indicate national team as defined under FIFA eligibility rules; some limited exceptions apply. Players may hold more than one non-FIFA nationality.

No.	Pos.	Nation	Player
1	GK	BRA	Renan Ribeiro
3	DF	POR	Tiago Ilori
4	DF	URU	Sebastián Coates
5	MF	BRA	Eduardo
7	MF	POR	Rafael Camacho
9	FW	ARG	Marcos Acuña
10	FW	ARG	Luciano Vietto
13	DF	MKD	Stefan Ristovski
14	DF	POR	Luís Neto
16	MF	ARG	Rodrigo Battaglia
18	FW	BRA	Fernando (on loan from Shakhtar Donetsk)
19	DF	FRA	Valentin Rosier

No.	Pos.	Nation	Player
20	FW	ECU	Gonzalo Plata
21	FW	ESP	Jesé (on loan from Paris Saint-Germain)
22	DF	FRA	Jérémy Mathieu
26	DF	COL	Cristian Borja
27	MF	POR	Miguel Luís
29	FW	BRA	Luiz Phellype
37	MF	BRA	Wendel
77	FW	CPV	Jovane Cabral
81	GK	POR	Luís Maximiano
89	FW	COD	Yannick Bolasie (on loan from Everton)
98	MF	CIV	Idrissa Doumbia
99	GK	POR	Diogo Sousa

==== Other players under contract ====
Note: Flags indicate national team as defined under FIFA eligibility rules; some limited exceptions apply. Players may hold more than one non-FIFA nationality.

No.	Pos.	Nation	Player
—	GK	ITA	Emiliano Viviano
—	DF	POR	Mauro Riquicho
—	MF	BRA	Mattheus

==== Out on loan ====
Note: Flags indicate national team as defined under FIFA eligibility rules; some limited exceptions apply. Players may hold more than one non-FIFA nationality.

No.	Pos.	Nation	Player
—	DF	GHA	Lumor Agbenyenu (at Mallorca until 30 June 2020)
—	DF	POR	Bruno Gaspar (at Olympiacos until 30 June 2020)
—	DF	POR	André Geraldes (at Maccabi Tel Aviv until 30 June 2020)
—	MF	POR	Filipe Chaby (at Académica until 30 June 2020)
—	MF	POR	Francisco Geraldes (at AEK Athens until 30 June 2020)
—	MF	CRO	Josip Mišić (at PAOK until 30 June 2020)

No.	Pos.	Nation	Player
—	MF	POR	João Palhinha (at Braga until 30 June 2020)
—	FW	COL	Leonardo Acevedo (at Varzim until 30 June 2020)
—	FW	MLI	Abdoulay Diaby (at Beşiktaş until 30 June 2020)
—	FW	ANG	Gelson (at Antalyaspor until 30 June 2020)
—	FW	BRA	Matheus Pereira (at West Bromwich Albion until 30 June 2020)
—	FW	ARG	Alan Ruiz (at Aldosivi until 30 June 2020)

== Transfers ==
=== In ===
No.	Pos.	Nat.	Name	Age	Moving from	Type	Transfer window	Ends	Transfer fee	Source
14	DF	(Portugal)	Luís Neto	31	Zenit Saint Petersburg (Russia)	Transfer	Summer	2022	Free	jn.pt
10	FW	(Argentina)	Luciano Vietto	25	Atlético Madrid (Spain)	Transfer	Summer	2024	€7.5M	desporto.sapo.pt
5	MF	(Brazil)	Eduardo	24	Internacional (Brazil)	Transfer	Summer	2024	€3M	
7	FW	(Portugal)	Rafael Camacho	19	Liverpool (England)	Transfer	Summer	2024	Undisclosed	
19	DF	(France)	Valentin Rosier	22	Dijon (France)	Transfer	Summer	2022	€7.5M	

Last updated: 18 March 2024

=== Out ===
No.	Pos.	Nat.	Name	Age	Moving to	Type	Transfer window	Transfer fee	Source
8	MF	(Portugal)	Bruno Fernandes	25	Manchester United (England)	Transfer	January	€55M (+€25M)	

Last updated: 18 March 2024

== Pre-season and friendlies ==
Win Draw Loss

On 29 April 2019, Sporting announced the first pre-season plans, including two matches in Switzerland as well as an unprecedented match against Liverpool in New York. The presentation match, against Valencia, was announced on 7 June following the announcement of a match against Club Brugge in Belgium three days earlier.

10 July 2019 Friendly	Rapperswil-Jona (Switzerland)	2–1	(Portugal) Sporting CP	Rapperswil, Switzerland
19:00 CEST (UTC+2)	Gele 49'; Hadzi 68'		B. Fernandes 13' (pen.)	Stadium: Stadion Grünfeld

13 July 2019 Friendly	St. Gallen (Switzerland)	2–2	(Portugal) Sporting CP	St. Gallen, Switzerland
19:00 CEST (UTC+2)	Kutesa 43'; Heftis 52'		B. Fernandes 2'; Wendel 25'	Stadium: Kybunpark

19 July 2019 Friendly	Club Brugge (Belgium)	2–2 (4–3 p)	(Portugal) Sporting CP	Bruges, Belgium
20:30 CEST (UTC+2)	Okereke 16'; Vanaken 62' (pen.)		B. Fernandes 45+2' (pen.); Cabral 53'	Stadium: Jan Breydel Stadium
	Penalties
	Vossen (penalty scored); Schrijvers (penalty scored); Danjuma (penalty missed); Mitrović (penalty scored); Deli (penalty missed); Okereke (penalty scored)		(penalty scored) Luiz Phellype; (penalty scored) Plata; (penalty missed) Luís; (penalty scored) Cabral; (penalty missed) Henrique; (penalty missed) Bragança

24 July 2019 Friendly	Liverpool (England)	2–2	(Portugal) Sporting CP	New York, United States
21:30 EDT (UTC−4)	Origi 20'; Wijnaldum 44'; Fabinho (yellow card) 88'		B. Fernandes 5'; Neto (yellow card) 30'; Wendel 54'	Stadium: Yankee Stadium; Attendance: 31,112; Referee: Sorin Stoica (United States)

28 July 2019 Troféu Cinco Violinos	Sporting CP (Portugal)	1–2	(Spain) Valencia	Lisbon, Portugal
19:00 WEST (UTC+1)	Dost 5'; B. Fernandes (yellow card) 54'		Kondogbia 9'; Gameiro 66'; Gabriel (yellow card) 71'	Stadium: Estádio José Alvalade; Attendance: 32,154; Referee: João Pinheiro (Portugal)

== Competitions ==
=== Overview ===
Competition	First match	Last match	Starting round	Final position	Record							
Competition	First match	Last match	Starting round	Final position	Pld	W	D	L	GF	GA	GD	Win %
Primeira Liga	11 August 2019	25 July 2020	Matchday 1	4th	34	18	6	10	49	34	+15	52.94
Taça de Portugal	17 October 2019		Third round	Third round	1	0	0	1	0	2	−2	0.00
Taça da Liga	26 September 2019	21 January 2020	Group stage	Semi-finals	4	2	0	2	8	6	+2	50.00
Supertaça Cândido de Oliveira	4 August 2019		Final	Runners-up	1	0	0	1	0	5	−5	0.00
Europa League	19 September 2019	27 February 2020	Group stage	Round of 32	8	5	0	3	15	12	+3	62.50
Total					48	25	6	17	72	59	+13	52.08

Last updated: 25 July 2020
Source: Sporting.pt

=== Supertaça Cândido de Oliveira ===
4 August 2019	Benfica	5–0	Sporting CP	Faro/Loulé
20:45 WEST (UTC+1)	Silva 40'; Dias (yellow card) 45+2'; Grimaldo (yellow card) 46', (goal) 64'; Ferro (yellow card) 50'; Pizzi 60', 75'; Seferovic (yellow card) 70'; De Tomás (yellow card) 72'; Chiquinho 90'		Acuña (yellow card) 20'; Doumbia (yellow card) 32' (yellow-red card) 89'; Raphinha (yellow card) 49'; B. Fernandes (yellow card) 62'; Coates (yellow card) 62'	Stadium: Estádio Algarve; Referee: Nuno Almeida

=== Primeira Liga ===
==== League table ====
Pos	Team	Pld	W	D	L	GF	GA	GD	Pts	Qualification or relegation
2	Benfica	34	24	5	5	71	26	+45	77	Qualification for the Champions League third qualifying round
3	Braga	34	18	6	10	61	40	+21	60 (Note: Head-to-head away goals: Braga 1, Sporting 0)	Qualification for the Europa League group stage (Note: Since the winners of the 2019–20 Taça de Portugal, Porto, qualified for the Champions League based on league position, the spot awarded to the third-placed team (Europa League third qualifying round) was passed to the fourth-placed team, and the spot awarded to the fourth-placed team (Europa League second qualifying round) was passed to the fifth-placed team.)
4	Sporting CP	34	18	6	10	49	34	+15	60	Qualification for the Europa League third qualifying round
5	Rio Ave	34	15	10	9	48	36	+12	55	Qualification for the Europa League second qualifying round
6	Famalicão	34	14	12	8	53	51	+2	54	

Source: Liga Portugal
Rules for classification: 1) Points; 2) Head-to-head points; 3) Head-to-head goal difference; 4) Head-to-head away goals scored; 5) Goal difference; 6) Matches won; 7) Goals scored; 8) Play-off.

==== Results summary ====
Overall								Home						Away					
Pld	W	D	L	GF	GA	GD	Pts	W	D	L	GF	GA	GD	W	D	L	GF	GA	GD
34	18	6	10	49	34	+15	60	12	1	4	25	13	+12	6	5	6	24	21	+3

Last updated: 25 July 2020.
Source: Liga Portugal

==== Result round by round ====
Round	1	2	3	4	5	6	7	8	9	10	11	12	13	14	15	16	17	18	19	20	21	22	23	24	25	26	27	28	29	30	31	32	33	34
Ground	A	H	A	H	A	H	A	H	A	A	H	A	H	A	H	A	H	H	A	H	A	H	A	H	A	H	H	A	H	A	H	A	H	A
Result	D	W	W	L	D	L	W	W	W	L	W	L	W	W	L	W	L	W	L	W	D	W	L	W	D	W	W	W	W	D	W	L	D	L
Position	7	4	1	5	8	7	5	4	4	4	4	4	4	3	4	4	4	3	4	3	4	4	4	4	4	4	3	3	3	3	3	3	3	4

Updated to match(es) played on 25 July 2020. Source: Liga Portugal
A = Away; H = Home; W = Win; D = Draw; L = Loss

==== Matches ====
11 August 2019 1	Marítimo	1–1	Sporting CP	Funchal, Madeira
18:30 WEST (UTC+01:00)	Getterson 7'	Report	Coates 29'	Stadium: Estádio do Marítimo; Attendance: 9,673; Referee: Tiago Martins

18 August 2019 2	Sporting CP	2–1	Braga	Lisbon
21:00 WEST (UTC+01:00)	Wendel 16'; B. Fernandes 44'	Report	Eduardo 73'	Stadium: Estádio José Alvalade; Attendance: 35,692; Referee: Luis Godinho

25 August 2019 3	Portimonense	1–3	Sporting CP	Portimão
18:30 WEST (UTC+01:00)	Rômulo 9'	Report	Raphinha 3', 65'; Luiz Phellype 5'	Stadium: Estádio Municipal de Portimão; Attendance: 5,634; Referee: Carlos Xistra

31 August 2019 4	Sporting CP	2–3	Rio Ave	Lisbon
19:00 WEST (UTC+01:00)	B. Fernandes 20'; Luiz Phellype 53'	Report	Filipe Augusto 6' (pen.), 90+2' (pen.); Ronan 86' (pen.)	Stadium: Estádio José Alvalade; Attendance: 37,942; Referee: João Pinheiro

15 September 2019 5	Boavista	1–1	Sporting CP	Porto
20:00 WEST (UTC+01:00)	Marlon 7'	Report	B. Fernandes 62'	Stadium: Estádio do Bessa; Attendance: 12,314; Referee: Jorge Sousa

23 September 2019 6	Sporting CP	1–2	Famalicão	Lisbon
21:00 WEST (UTC+01:00)	Vietto 25'	Report	Lameiras 55'; Coates 89' (o.g.)	Stadium: Estádio de Alvalade; Attendance: 28,576; Referee: Hugo Miguel

30 September 2019 7	Desportivo das Aves	0–1	Sporting CP	Vila das Aves
20:15 WEST (UTC+01:00)		Report	B. Fernandes 83' (pen.)	Stadium: Estádio do Clube Desportivo das Aves; Attendance: 2,850; Referee: Carlos Xistra

27 October 2019 8	Sporting CP	3–1	Vitória de Guimarães	Lisbon
20:00 WET (UTC±00:00)	Jesé 30'; Acuña 32'; Coates 73'	Report	Bonatini 67'	Stadium: Estádio José Alvalade; Attendance: 28,135; Referee: Artur Soares Dias

31 October 2019 9	Paços de Ferreira	1–2	Sporting CP	Paços de Ferreira
19:45 WET (UTC±00:00)	Douglas 73'	Report	Luiz Phellype 12'; B. Fernandes 79' (pen.)	Stadium: Estádio da Mata Real; Attendance: 2,901; Referee: Rui Costa

3 November 2019 10	Tondela	1–0	Sporting CP	Tondela
17:30 WET (UTC±00:00)	Bruno Wilson 88'	Report		Stadium: Estádio João Cardoso; Attendance: 4,096; Referee: Fábio Veríssimo

10 November 2019 11	Sporting CP	2–0	Belenenses	Lisbon
18:30 WET (UTC±00:00)	Vietto 74', 80'	Report		Stadium: Estádio José Alvalade; Attendance: 27,102; Referee: Manuel Oliveira

1 December 2019 12	Gil Vicente	3–1	Sporting CP	Barcelos
20:00 WET (UTC±00:00)	Kraev 18'; Lima 54' (pen.); Naidji 90+8'	Report	Wendel 45+3'	Stadium: Estádio Cidade de Barcelos; Attendance: 7,009; Referee: Hugo Miguel

8 December 2019 13	Sporting CP	1–0	Moreirense	Lisbon
17:30 WET (UTC±00:00)	Luiz Phellype 71'	Report		Stadium: Estádio José Alvalade; Attendance: 26,093; Referee: Artur Soares Dias

16 December 2019 14	Santa Clara	0–4	Sporting CP	Ponta Delgada
19:05 WET (UTC±00:00)		Report	Luiz Phellype 40', 47'; Bolasie 54'; B. Fernandes 60' (pen.)	Stadium: Estádio de São Miguel; Attendance: 5,282; Referee: Manuel Mota

5 January 2020 15	Sporting CP	1–2	Porto	Lisbon
17:30 WET (UTC±00:00)	Acuña 44'	Report	Marega 6'; Soares 73'	Stadium: Estádio José Alvalade; Attendance: 41,247; Referee: Jorge Sousa

11 January 2020 16	Vitória de Setúbal	1–3	Sporting CP	Setúbal
20:30 WET (UTC±00:00)	Carlinhos 63'	Report	Meira 27' (o.g.); B. Fernandes 34', 90+5'	Stadium: Estádio do Bonfim; Attendance: 5,761; Referee: Tiago Martins

17 January 2020 17	Sporting CP	0–2	Benfica	Lisbon
21:15 WET (UTC±00:00)		Report	Silva 80', 90+9'	Stadium: Estádio José Alvalade; Attendance: 41,017; Referee: Hugo Miguel

27 January 2020 18	Sporting CP	1–0	Marítimo	Lisbon
21:00 WET (UTC±00:00)	Borja 76'	Report		Stadium: Estádio José Alvalade; Attendance: 12,798; Referee: Rui Costa

2 February 2020 19	Braga	1–0	Sporting CP	Braga
17:30 WET (UTC±00:00)	Trincão 75'	Report		Stadium: Estádio Municipal de Braga; Attendance: 18,379; Referee: Jorge Sousa

9 February 2020 20	Sporting CP	2–1	Portimonense	Lisbon
17:30 WET (UTC±00:00)	Mathieu 31'; Jadson 72' (o.g.)	Report	Martínez 26'	Stadium: Estádio José Alvalade; Attendance: 28,763; Referee: Hugo Miguel

15 February 2020 21	Rio Ave	1–1	Sporting CP	Vila do Conde
20:30 WET (UTC±00:00)	Piazon 2'	Report	Cabral 84' (pen.)	Stadium: Estádio dos Arcos; Attendance: 4,434; Referee: Fábio Veríssimo

23 February 2020 22	Sporting CP	2–0	Boavista	Lisbon
17:30 WET (UTC±00:00)	Šporar 13'; Plata 42'	Report		Stadium: Estádio José Alvalade; Attendance: 29,171; Referee: Nuno Almeida

3 March 2020 23	Famalicão	3–1	Sporting CP	Vila Nova de Famalicão
20:00 WET (UTC±00:00)	Račić 5'; Gonçalves 8', 65'	Report	Coates 45'	Stadium: Estádio Municipal 22 de Junho; Attendance: 3,824; Referee: Luís Godinho

8 March 2020 24	Sporting CP	2–0	Desportivo das Aves	Lisbon
17:30 WET (UTC±00:00)	Šporar 62'; Vietto 68' (pen.)	Report		Stadium: Estádio José Alvalade; Attendance: 27,272; Referee: Manuel Oliveira

4 June 2020 25	Vitória de Guimarães	2–2	Sporting CP	Guimarães
21:15 WEST (UTC+01:00)	Teixeira 32'; Edwards 68'	Report	Šporar 18', 54'	Stadium: Estádio D. Afonso Henriques; Attendance: 0 Referee: Carlos Xistra

12 June 2020 26	Sporting CP	1–0	Paços de Ferreira	Lisbon
21:15 WEST (UTC+01:00)	Cabral 64'	Report		Stadium: Estádio José Alvalade; Attendance: 0 Referee: Rui Costa

18 June 2020 27	Sporting CP	2–0	Tondela	Lisbon
21:15 WEST (UTC+01:00)	Cabral 13'; Šporar 31' (pen.)	Report		Stadium: Estádio José Alvalade; Attendance: 0 Referee: Manuel Oliveira

26 June 2020 28	Belenenses	1–3	Sporting CP	Lisbon
19:15 WEST (UTC+01:00)	Licá 9'	Report	Coates 21'; Cabral 36', 45+2' (pen.)	Stadium: Estádio do Restelo; Attendance: 0 Referee: Hélder Malheiro

1 July 2020 29	Sporting CP	2–1	Gil Vicente	Lisbon
21:15 WEST (UTC+01:00)	Wendel 21'; Plata 49'	Report	Ribeiro 90' (pen.)	Stadium: Estádio José Alvalade; Attendance: 0 Referee: Rui Oliveira

6 July 2020 30	Moreirense	0–0	Sporting CP	Moreira de Cónegos
21:00 WEST (UTC+01:00)		Report		Stadium: Parque de Jogos Comendador Joaquim de Almeida Freitas; Attendance: 0 Referee: Tiago Martins

10 July 2020 31	Sporting CP	1–0	Santa Clara	Lisbon
19:15 WEST (UTC+01:00)	Cabral 67'	Report		Stadium: Estádio José Alvalade; Attendance: 0 Referee: António Nobre

15 July 2020 32	Porto	2–0	Sporting CP	Porto
21:30 WEST (UTC+01:00)	Pereira 64'; Marega 90+1'	Report		Stadium: Estádio do Dragão; Attendance: 0 Referee: João Pinheiro

21 July 2020 33	Sporting CP	0–0	Vitória de Setúbal	Lisbon
19:00 WEST (UTC+01:00)		Report		Stadium: Estádio José Alvalade; Attendance: 0 Referee: Nuno Almeida

25 July 2020 34	Benfica	2–1	Sporting CP	Lisbon
21:15 WEST (UTC+01:00)	Seferovic 28'; Carlos Vinícius 88'	Report	Šporar 69'	Stadium: Estádio da Luz; Attendance: 0 Referee: Fábio Veríssimo

=== Taça de Portugal ===
==== Third round ====
17 October 2019	Alverca	2–0	Sporting CP	Alverca
20:45 WEST (UTC+01:00)	Apolinário 10'; Silva 55'			Stadium: Complexo Desportivo FC Alverca; Referee: Luis Godinho

=== Taça da Liga ===
==== Third round ====
Pos	Team	Pld	W	D	L	GF	GA	GD	Pts	Qualification	SPO	RAV	PTM	GIL
1	Sporting CP	3	2	0	1	7	4	+3	6	Advance to knockout phase	—	1–2	—	—
2	Rio Ave	3	1	1	1	3	3	0	4		—	—	—	0–1
3	Portimonense	3	1	1	1	5	6	−1	4		2–4	1–1	—	—
4	Gil Vicente	3	1	0	2	2	4	−2	3		0–2	—	1–2	—

Source: Liga Portugal
Rules for classification: Tiebreakers

26 September 2019 1	Sporting CP	1–2	Rio Ave	Lisbon
20:00 WEST (UTC+01:00)	B. Fernandes 35'	Report	Ronan 32'; Piazon 83'	Stadium: Estádio José Alvalade; Attendance: 12,656; Referee: Manuel Mota

4 December 2019 2	Gil Vicente	0–2	Sporting CP	Barcelos
20:45 WET (UTC±00:00)		Report	B. Fernandes 89'; Vietto 90+4'	Stadium: Estádio Cidade de Barcelos; Attendance: 3,202; Referee: Rui Costa

21 December 2019 3	Portimonense	2–4	Sporting CP	Portimão
17:00 WET (UTC±00:00)	Martínez 16' (pen.); Mathieu 31' (o.g.)	Report	Vietto 37'; Camacho 77'; Plata 84'; Luiz Phellype 90+5'	Stadium: Estádio Municipal de Portimão; Attendance: 3,499; Referee: João Pinheiro

==== Knockout phase ====
21 January 2020 Semi-finals	Braga	2–1	Sporting CP	Braga
19:45 WET (UTC±00:00)	R. Horta 8'; Paulinho 90'	Report	Mathieu 44'	Stadium: Estádio Municipal de Braga; Attendance: 10,047; Referee: Nuno Almeida

=== UEFA Europa League ===
==== Group stage ====
Pos	Team	Pld	W	D	L	GF	GA	GD	Pts	Qualification	LASK	SPO	PSV	ROS
1	(Austria) LASK	6	4	1	1	11	4	+7	13	Advance to knockout phase	—	3–0	4–1	1–0
2	(Portugal) Sporting CP	6	4	0	2	11	7	+4	12	Advance to knockout phase	2–1	—	4–0	1–0
3	(Netherlands) PSV Eindhoven	6	2	2	2	9	12	−3	8		0–0	3–2	—	1–1
4	(Norway) Rosenborg	6	0	1	5	3	11	−8	1		1–2	0–2	1–4	—

Source: UEFA
Rules for classification: Group stage tiebreakers

19 September 2019 1	PSV Eindhoven (Netherlands)	3–2	(Portugal) Sporting CP	Eindhoven
18:55 CEST	Malen 19'; Coates 25' (o.g.); Baumgartl 48'	Report	B. Fernandes 38' (pen.); Mendes 82'	Stadium: Philips Stadion; Attendance: 30,000; Referee: Ivan Kružliak (Slovakia)

3 October 2019 2	Sporting CP (Portugal)	2–1	(Austria) LASK	Lisbon
20:00 WEST	Luiz Phellype 58'; B. Fernandes 63'	Report	Raguž 16'	Stadium: Estádio José Alvalade; Attendance: 31,225; Referee: Alain Durieux (Luxembourg)

24 October 2019 3	Sporting CP (Portugal)	1–0	(Norway) Rosenborg	Lisbon
20:00 WEST	Bolasie 70'	Report		Stadium: Estádio José Alvalade; Attendance: 27,671; Referee: Lawrence Visser (Belgium)

7 November 2019 4	Rosenborg (Norway)	0–2	(Portugal) Sporting CP	Trondheim
18:55 CET		Report	Coates 16'; B. Fernandes 38'	Stadium: Lerkendal Stadion; Attendance: 11,018; Referee: Kevin Clancy (Scotland)

28 November 2019 5	Sporting CP (Portugal)	4–0	(Netherlands) PSV Eindhoven	Lisbon
20:00 WET	Luiz Phellype 9'; B. Fernandes 16', 64' (pen.); Mathieu 43'	Report		Stadium: Estádio José Alvalade; Attendance: 30,146; Referee: Orel Grinfeld (Israel)

12 December 2019 6	LASK (Austria)	3–0	(Portugal) Sporting CP	Linz
18:55 CET	Trauner 23'; Klauss 38' (pen.); Raguž 90+3'	Report		Stadium: Waldstadion; Attendance: 11,627; Referee: Willie Collum (Scotland)

==== Knockout phase ====
===== Round of 32 =====
20 February 2020 First leg	Sporting CP (Portugal)	3–1	(Turkey) İstanbul Başakşehir	Lisbon
17:55 WET	Coates 3'; Šporar 44'; Vietto 51'	Report	Višća 76' (pen.)	Stadium: Estádio José Alvalade; Attendance: 27,392; Referee: Anthony Taylor (England)

27 February 2020 Second leg	İstanbul Başakşehir (Turkey)	4–1 (a.e.t.) (5–4 agg.)	(Portugal) Sporting CP	Istanbul
20:55 TRT	Škrtel 31'; Aleksić 45'; Višća 90+2', 119' (pen.)	Report	Vietto 68'	Stadium: Başakşehir Fatih Terim Stadium; Attendance: 5,892; Referee: Antonio Mateu Lahoz (Spain)

== Statistics ==
=== Appearances and goals ===
No.	Pos	Nat	Player	Total		Primeira Liga		Taça de Portugal		Taça da Liga		UEFA Europa League		Supertaça Cândido de Oliveira	
No.	Pos	Nat	Player	Apps	Goals	Apps	Goals	Apps	Goals	Apps	Goals	Apps	Goals	Apps	Goals
Goalkeepers
1	GK	(Brazil) BRA	Renan Ribeiro	18	0	11	0	0	0	1	0	5	0	1	0
81	GK	(Portugal) POR	Luís Maximiano	31	0	23	0	1	0	3	0	3+1	0	0	0
99	GK	(Portugal) POR	Diogo Sousa	0	0	0	0	0	0	0	0	0	0	0	0
Defenders
3	DF	(Portugal) POR	Tiago Ilori	14	0	6+2	0	1	0	1	0	4	0	0	0
4	DF	(Uruguay) URU	Sebastián Coates	40	6	28+1	4	0	0	3	0	7	2	1	0
13	DF	(North Macedonia) MKD	Stefan Ristovski	26	0	19+2	0	0	0	3	0	2	0	0	0
14	DF	(Portugal) POR	Luís Neto	22	0	11+1	0	1	0	2+1	0	4+1	0	1	0
19	DF	(France) FRA	Valentin Rosier	16	0	8+1	0	1	0	1	0	5	0	0	0
26	DF	(Colombia) COL	Cristian Borja	30	1	15+8	1	1	0	1	0	2+2	0	0+1	0
35	DF	(Portugal) POR	Nuno Mendes	9	0	7+2	0	0	0	0	0	0	0	0	0
72	DF	(Portugal) POR	Eduardo Quaresma	9	0	9	0	0	0	0	0	0	0	0	0
Midfielders
5	MF	(Brazil) BRA	Eduardo Henrique	22	0	8+7	0	1	0	0+1	0	2+3	0	0	0
7	MF	(Portugal) POR	Rafael Camacho	26	1	9+10	0	0	0	2+1	1	1+3	0	0	0
16	MF	(Argentina) ARG	Rodrigo Battaglia	20	0	9+6	0	0	0	2+1	0	2	0	0	0
17	MF	(Portugal) POR	Francisco Geraldes	8	0	1+7	0	0	0	0	0	0	0	0	0
27	MF	(Portugal) POR	Miguel Luís	7	0	2	0	1	0	1	0	3	0	0	0
37	MF	(Brazil) BRA	Wendel	39	3	26+2	3	0	0	4	0	6	0	1	0
73	MF	(Brazil) BRA	Matheus Luiz	10	0	9+1	0	0	0	0	0	0	0	0	0
93	MF	(Portugal) POR	Rodrigo Fernandes	4	0	1+1	0	0	0	0	0	1+1	0	0	0
98	MF	(Ivory Coast) CIV	Idrissa Doumbia	35	0	17+5	0	1	0	3	0	5+3	0	1	0
Forwards
9	FW	(Argentina) ARG	Marcos Acuña	36	2	23+1	2	0+1	0	4	0	6	0	1	0
10	FW	(Argentina) ARG	Luciano Vietto	35	8	19+5	4	1	0	2+1	2	6+1	2	0	0
20	FW	(Ecuador) ECU	Gonzalo Plata	24	3	12+9	2	0	0	0+1	1	0+2	0	0	0
29	FW	(Brazil) BRA	Luiz Phellype	26	9	12+4	6	1	0	2+2	1	3+1	2	0+1	0
51	FW	(Portugal) POR	Tiago Tomás	5	0	1+4	0	0	0	0	0	0	0	0	0
55	FW	(Portugal) POR	Pedro Mendes	12	1	0+6	0	0	0	0	0	1+5	1	0	0
77	FW	(Cape Verde) CPV	Jovane Cabral	20	6	10+6	6	0	0	0+1	0	2+1	0	0	0
90	FW	(Slovenia) SVN	Andraž Šporar	18	7	15+1	6	0	0	0	0	2	1	0	0
96	FW	(Portugal) POR	Joelson Fernandes	4	0	0+4	0	0	0	0	0	0	0	0	0
Players who have made an appearance this season but have left the club
50	DF	(Portugal) POR	Thierry Correia	5	0	4	0	0	0	0	0	0	0	1	0
76	DF	(Portugal) POR	Bruno Gaspar	0	0	0	0	0	0	0	0	0	0	0	0
8	MF	(Portugal) POR	Bruno Fernandes	28	15	17	8	0+1	0	4	2	5	5	1	0
11	FW	(Brazil) BRA	Raphinha	5	2	4	2	0	0	0	0	0	0	1	0
18	FW	(Brazil) BRA	Fernando	0	0	0	0	0	0	0	0	0	0	0	0
21	FW	(Spain) ESP	Jesé	17	1	6+6	1	1	0	1+1	0	1+1	0	0	0
22	DF	(France) FRA	Jérémy Mathieu	25	3	19	1	0	0	2	1	3	1	1	0
23	FW	(Mali) MLI	Abdoulay Diaby	3	0	2	0	0	0	0	0	0	0	0+1	0
28	FW	(Netherlands) NED	Bas Dost	2	0	1	0	0	0	0	0	0	0	1	0
89	FW	(Democratic Republic of the Congo) COD	Yannick Bolasie	25	2	12+2	1	0+1	0	2+1	0	7	1	0	0

- Last updated: 25 July 2020
