= 2020 UEFA Europa League final =

- Match programme cover
- Event: 2019–20 UEFA Europa League
Sevilla	Inter Milan
(Spain)	(Italy)
3	2
- Date: 21 August 2020
- Venue: RheinEnergieStadion, Cologne
- Man of the Match: Luuk de Jong (Sevilla)
- Referee: Danny Makkelie (Netherlands)
- Attendance: 0 (Note: The remainder of the competition, held in August 2020, was played behind closed doors due to the COVID-19 pandemic in Europe.)
- Weather: Partly cloudy night 24 °C (75 °F); 55% humidity

The 2020 UEFA Europa League final was the final match of the 2019–20 UEFA Europa League, the 49th season of Europe's secondary club football tournament organised by UEFA, and the 11th season since it was renamed from the UEFA Cup to the UEFA Europa League. It was played at the RheinEnergieStadion in Cologne, Germany on 21 August 2020, between Spanish side Sevilla and Italian side Inter Milan. The match was held behind closed doors due to the COVID-19 pandemic in Europe.

The final was originally scheduled to be played on 27 May 2020 at the Stadion Energa Gdańsk in Gdańsk, Poland. However, UEFA announced on 23 March 2020 that the final was postponed due to the COVID-19 pandemic. On 17 June 2020, the UEFA Executive Committee chose to relocate the final to Cologne, as part of a "final-eight tournament" consisting of single-match knockout ties played in four stadiums across Germany.

Sevilla won the match 3–2 for their record sixth UEFA Cup/Europa League title. As winners, they earned the right to play against the winners of the 2019–20 UEFA Champions League, Bayern Munich, in the 2020 UEFA Super Cup. They also qualified to enter the group stage of the 2020–21 UEFA Champions League; since Sevilla had already qualified through their league performance, the berth reserved was given to the third-placed team of the 2019–20 Ligue 1 (Rennes), the 5th-ranked association according to next season's access list.

== Venue ==
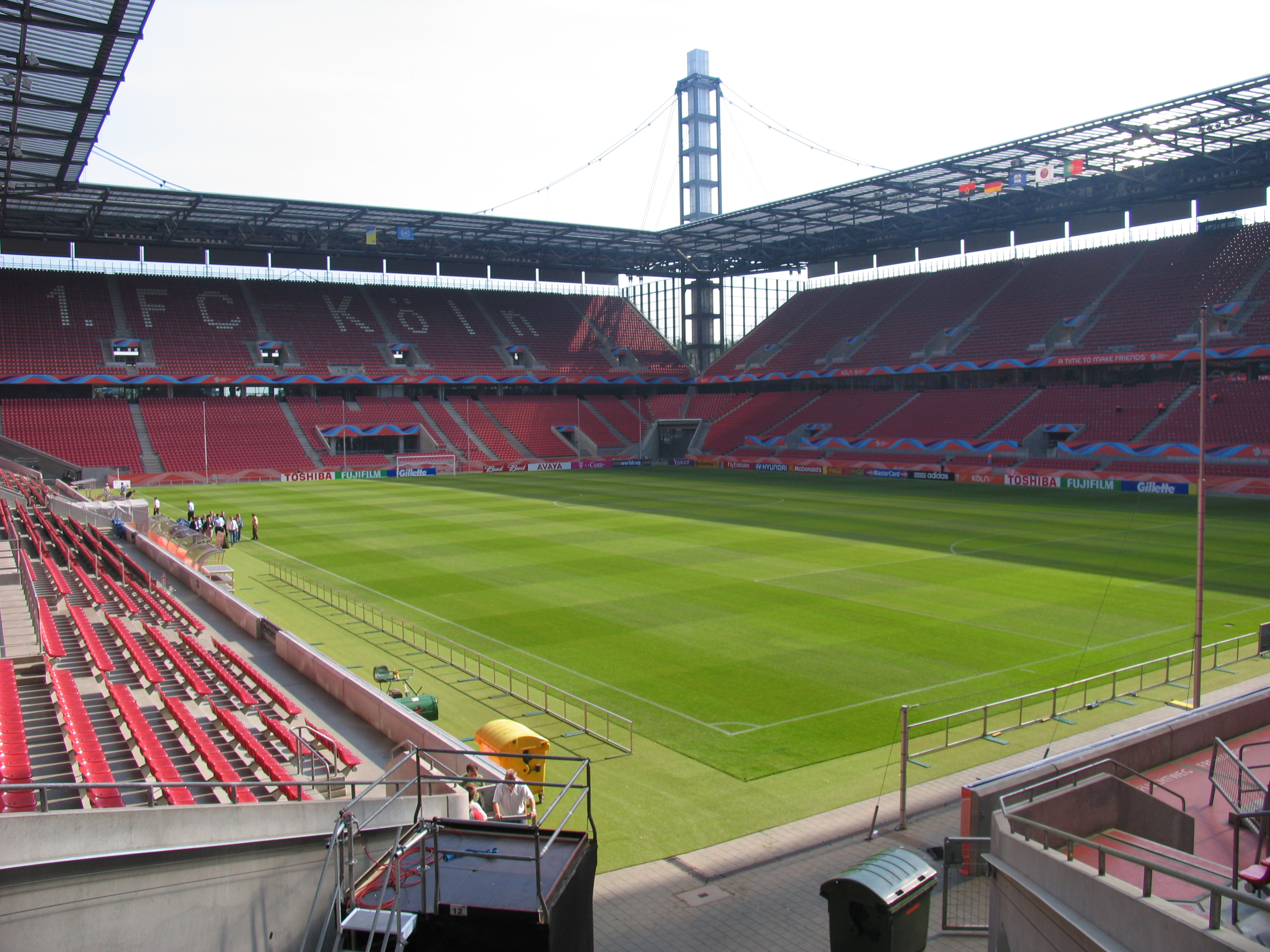
The RheinEnergieStadion in Cologne hosted the final.

The UEFA Executive Committee chose RheinEnergieStadion in Cologne as the host at their meeting on 17 June 2020. This was the first UEFA club competition final hosted at the stadium and the first Europa League final held in Germany since 2010. During the two-legged final era, the country hosted either one or both legs 11 times, before hosting the single-legged 2001 UEFA Cup Final in Dortmund and the 2010 final in Hamburg.

The stadium was first opened in 1923 as the Müngersdorfer Stadion and has been the home stadium of German Bundesliga side 1. FC Köln since 1948. It underwent two major renovations during its lifetime. It hosted UEFA Euro 1988 as well as the 2005 FIFA Confederations Cup and the 2006 FIFA World Cup.

== Background ==
The match was a record-extending sixth UEFA Cup/Europa League final for Sevilla, the most successful team in competition history. The club won all their prior finals in 2006, 2007, 2014, 2015 and 2016.

Inter Milan reached their fifth UEFA Cup/Europa League final, second only to Sevilla. They previously won three finals in 1991, 1994 and 1998, and lost to Schalke 04 in 1997. They were the first Italian team to reach a UEFA Cup/Europa League final since Parma in 1999.

=== Previous finals ===
In the following table, finals until 2009 were in the UEFA Cup era, since 2010 were in the UEFA Europa League era.

Team	Previous final appearances (bold indicates winners)
(Spain) Sevilla	5 (**2006**, **2007**, **2014**, **2015**, **2016**)
(Italy) Inter Milan	4 (**1991**, **1994**, 1997, **1998**)

== Route to the final ==
Note: In all results below, the score of the finalist is given first (H: home; A: away; N: neutral).

(Spain) Sevilla				Round	(Italy) Inter Milan			
**Europa League**					**Champions League**			
Opponent	Result			Group stage (EL, CL)	Opponent	Result		
(Azerbaijan) Qarabağ	3–0 (A)			Matchday 1	(Czech Republic) Slavia Prague	1–1 (H)		
(Cyprus) APOEL	1–0 (H)			Matchday 2	(Spain) Barcelona	1–2 (A)		
(Luxembourg) F91 Dudelange	3–0 (H)			Matchday 3	(Germany) Borussia Dortmund	2–0 (H)		
(Luxembourg) F91 Dudelange	5–2 (A)			Matchday 4	(Germany) Borussia Dortmund	2–3 (A)		
(Azerbaijan) Qarabağ	2–0 (H)			Matchday 5	(Czech Republic) Slavia Prague	3–1 (A)		
(Cyprus) APOEL	0–1 (A)			Matchday 6	(Spain) Barcelona	1–2 (H)		
**Group A winners**: Pos / Team / Pld / Pts; **1** / (Spain) Sevilla / **6** / **15**; 2 / (Cyprus) APOEL / 6 / **10**; 3 / (Azerbaijan) Qarabağ / 6 / **5**; 4 / (Luxembourg) F91 Dudelange / 6 / **4**; Source: UEFA				Final standings	**Group F third place**: Pos / Team / Pld / Pts; 1 / (Spain) Barcelona / 6 / **14**; 2 / (Germany) Borussia Dortmund / 6 / **10**; **3** / (Italy) Inter Milan / **6** / **7**; 4 / (Czech Republic) Slavia Prague / 6 / **2**; Source: UEFA			
**Group A winners**: Pos / Team / Pld / Pts; **1** / (Spain) Sevilla / **6** / **15**; 2 / (Cyprus) APOEL / 6 / **10**; 3 / (Azerbaijan) Qarabağ / 6 / **5**; 4 / (Luxembourg) F91 Dudelange / 6 / **4**; Source: UEFA					**Europa League**			
Opponent	Agg.	1st leg	2nd leg	Knockout phase	Opponent	Agg.	1st leg	2nd leg
(Romania) CFR Cluj	1–1 (a)	1–1 (A)	0–0 (H)	Round of 32	(Bulgaria) Ludogorets Razgrad	4–1	2–0 (A)	2–1 (H)
(Italy) Roma	2–0 (N)			Round of 16	(Spain) Getafe	2–0 (N)		
(England) Wolverhampton Wanderers	1–0 (N)			Quarter-finals	(Germany) Bayer Leverkusen	2–1 (N)		
(England) Manchester United	2–1 (N)			Semi-finals	(Ukraine) Shakhtar Donetsk	5–0 (N)		

== Pre-match ==
Original identity of the 2020 UEFA Europa League Final

=== Identity ===
The original identity of the 2020 UEFA Europa League Final was unveiled at the group stage draw on 30 August 2019.

=== Ambassador ===
The original ambassador for the Gdańsk final was former Polish international Andrzej Buncol, who won the 1987–88 UEFA Cup with Bayer Leverkusen.

=== Officials ===
On 18 August 2020, UEFA named Dutchman Danny Makkelie as the referee for the final. Makkelie had been a FIFA referee since 2011, and was previously an additional assistant referee in the 2018 UEFA Europa League Final and the video assistant referee in the 2019 UEFA Champions League Final. He was also an assistant video assistant referee in the 2018 FIFA World Cup Final. He was joined by four of his fellow countrymen, with Mario Diks and Hessel Steegstra as assistant referees, Jochem Kamphuis as the video assistant referee and Kevin Blom as one of the assistant VAR officials. The other assistant VAR for the final was Paweł Gil from Poland, with his compatriot Tomasz Sokolnicki serving as the offside VAR official. Anastasios Sidiropoulos of Greece was the fourth official.

== Match ==
=== Details ===
The "home" team (for administrative purposes) was determined by an additional draw held on 10 July 2020 (after the quarter-final and semi-final draws), at the UEFA headquarters in Nyon, Switzerland.

21 August 2020
21:00 UTC+2

Sevilla (Spain)	3–2	(Italy) Inter Milan
De Jong 12', 33'; Lukaku 74' (o.g.)	Report	Lukaku 5' (pen.); Godín 36'

RheinEnergieStadion, Cologne
Attendance: 0
Referee: Danny Makkelie (Netherlands)

**Sevilla**	**Inter Milan**

GK	13	(Morocco) Yassine Bounou
RB	16	(Spain) Jesús Navas (c)
CB	12	(France) Jules Koundé
CB	20	(Brazil) Diego Carlos	(yellow card) 4'	(substituted off) 86'
LB	23	(Spain) Sergio Reguilón
RM	24	(Spain) Joan Jordán
CM	25	(Brazil) Fernando
LM	10	(Argentina) Éver Banega	(yellow card) 45'
RF	5	(Argentina) Lucas Ocampos		(substituted off) 71'
CF	19	(Netherlands) Luuk de Jong		(substituted off) 85'
LF	41	(Spain) Suso		(substituted off) 77'
Substitutes:
GK	1	(Czech Republic) Tomáš Vaclík
GK	31	(Spain) Javi Díaz
DF	3	(Spain) Sergi Gómez
DF	18	(Spain) Sergio Escudero
DF	36	(Spain) Genaro Rodríguez
DF	40	(Spain) Pablo Pérez
MF	17	(Serbia) Nemanja Gudelj		(substituted on) 86'
MF	21	(Spain) Óliver Torres
MF	22	(Argentina) Franco Vázquez		(substituted on) 77'
FW	11	(Spain) Munir		(substituted on) 71'
FW	28	(Spain) José Lara
FW	51	(Morocco) Youssef En-Nesyri		(substituted on) 85'
Manager:
(Spain) Julen Lopetegui

GK	1	(Slovenia) Samir Handanović (c)
CB	2	(Uruguay) Diego Godín		(substituted off) 90'
CB	6	(Netherlands) Stefan de Vrij
CB	95	(Italy) Alessandro Bastoni	(yellow card) 55'
RM	33	(Italy) Danilo D'Ambrosio		(substituted off) 78'
CM	23	(Italy) Nicolò Barella	(yellow card) 41'
CM	77	(Croatia) Marcelo Brozović
CM	5	(Italy) Roberto Gagliardini	(yellow card) 73'	(substituted off) 78'
LM	15	(England) Ashley Young
CF	9	(Belgium) Romelu Lukaku
CF	10	(Argentina) Lautaro Martínez		(substituted off) 78'
Substitutes:
GK	27	(Italy) Daniele Padelli
DF	13	(Italy) Andrea Ranocchia
DF	31	(Italy) Lorenzo Pirola
DF	34	(Italy) Cristiano Biraghi
DF	37	(Slovakia) Milan Škriniar
MF	11	(Nigeria) Victor Moses		(substituted on) 78'
MF	12	(Italy) Stefano Sensi
MF	20	(Spain) Borja Valero
MF	24	(Denmark) Christian Eriksen		(substituted on) 78'
MF	87	(Italy) Antonio Candreva		(substituted on) 90'
FW	7	(Chile) Alexis Sánchez		(substituted on) 78'
FW	30	(Italy) Sebastiano Esposito
Manager:
(Italy) Antonio Conte			(yellow card) 18'

Man of the Match:
Luuk de Jong (Sevilla)

Assistant referees:
Mario Diks (Netherlands)
Hessel Steegstra (Netherlands)
Fourth official:
Anastasios Sidiropoulos (Greece)
Video assistant referee:
Jochem Kamphuis (Netherlands)
Assistant video assistant referees:
Kevin Blom (Netherlands)
Paweł Gil (Poland)
Offside video assistant referee:
Paweł Sokolnicki (Poland)

**Match rules**

- 90 minutes
- 30 minutes of extra time if necessary
- Penalty shoot-out if scores still level
- Twelve named substitutes
- Maximum of five substitutions, with a sixth allowed in extra time (Note: Each team was only given three opportunities to make substitutions, with a fourth opportunity in extra time, excluding substitutions made at half-time, before the start of extra time and at half-time in extra time.)

=== Statistics ===
First half
Statistic	Sevilla	Inter Milan
Goals scored	2	2
Total shots	8	4
Shots on target	5	2
Saves	0	3
Ball possession	57%	43%
Corner kicks	1	0
Fouls committed	6	11
Offsides	0	1
Yellow cards	2	2
Red cards	0	0

Second half
Statistic	Sevilla	Inter Milan
Goals scored	1	0
Total shots	6	5
Shots on target	0	2
Saves	2	0
Ball possession	38%	62%
Corner kicks	0	2
Fouls committed	10	8
Offsides	0	1
Yellow cards	0	2
Red cards	0	0

Overall
Statistic	Sevilla	Inter Milan
Goals scored	3	2
Total shots	14	9
Shots on target	5	4
Saves	2	3
Ball possession	47%	53%
Corner kicks	1	2
Fouls committed	16	19
Offsides	0	2
Yellow cards	2	4
Red cards	0	0

== See also ==
- 2020 UEFA Champions League final
- 2020 UEFA Women's Champions League final
- 2020 UEFA Super Cup
- Inter Milan in European football
- Sevilla FC in European football
- 2019–20 Inter Milan season
- 2019–20 Sevilla FC season
