= Pedro Mendes (footballer, born 1999) =

Portuguese footballer

Personal information
- Full name: Pedro Manuel Lobo Peixoto Mineiro Mendes
- Date of birth: 1 August 1999 (age 27)
- Place of birth: Guimarães, Portugal
- Height: 1.87 m (6 ft 2 in)
- Position: Striker

Team information
- Current team: Gençlerbirliği
- Number: 9

Youth career
- 2008–2012: Vitória Guimarães
- 2012–2013: Sandinenses
- 2013–2014: Vitória Guimarães
- 2014–2017: Moreirense
- 2017–2018: Sporting CP

Senior career*
Years	Team	Apps	(Gls)
2018–2020	Sporting U23	53	(32)
2019–2022	Sporting CP	6	(0)
2020–2021	→ Almería (loan)	10	(0)
2021	→ Nacional (loan)	12	(2)
2021–2022	→ Rio Ave (loan)	34	(10)
2022–2024	Ascoli	57	(15)
2024–2026	Modena	60	(9)
2026–	Gençlerbirliği	3	(0)

International career
2017	Portugal U18	5	(1)
2019	Portugal U21	2	(0)
- * Club domestic league appearances and goals as of 14:36, 25 September 2026 (UTC)

Pedro Manuel Lobo Peixoto Mineiro Mendes (born 1 August 1999) is a Portuguese professional footballer who plays as a striker for Süper Lig club Gençlerbirliği.

== Club career ==
=== Sporting CP ===
Born in Guimarães, Mendes started his youth career with local clubs Vitória S.C. and Moreirense F.C. before joining Sporting CP's academy at the age of 18. On 19 September 2019, after having scored seven goals in six games for the under-23 side to start the new season and before he had made his debut with the first team in the Primeira Liga due to registration problems, he appeared with the latter in a group stage match in the UEFA Europa League against PSV Eindhoven, and found the net immediately after having come as an 81st-minute substitute for fellow youth graduate Miguel Luís, albeit in a 3–2 away defeat; in the process, he became Sporting's first player to achieve the feat on his debut in European competition.

Mendes finally made his debut in the Portuguese top division on 11 January 2020, playing 14 minutes in the 3–1 away victory over Vitória de Setúbal. On 16 September, he joined Segunda División side UD Almería on a season-long loan. The following 1 February, however, he signed with C.D. Nacional also on loan. In his second appearance for the latter, as a second-half substitute against S.C. Farense, he scored twice (but once in his own net) in a 2–3 home loss.

On 16 July 2021, Mendes moved to Liga Portugal 2 club Rio Ave F.C. on a deal until the end of the campaign with an option to buy. He scored a squad-best ten goals as the champions returned to the top flight after one year out.

=== Ascoli ===
On 29 August 2022, Mendes signed a three-year contract with Ascoli Calcio 1898 FC of Italy's Serie B. He scored a team-best 11 times in his second season, in a final relegation; he also missed the final two months due to a tendon injury.

=== Modena ===
Mendes remained in the Italian second tier for the 2024–25 campaign, joining Modena FC 2018. He scored his first goal on 23 August 2024, in a 2–1 comeback win over SSC Bari.

Modena reached the promotion playoffs in 2025–26, but were eliminated in the first round by SS Juve Stabia, with Mendes featuring one minute of the 1–0 loss.

=== Gençlerbirliği ===
On 4 September 2026, Mendes agreed to a two-year deal at Gençlerbirliği S.K. of the Turkish Süper Lig.

== International career ==
Mendes won his first cap for Portugal at under-21 level on 11 October 2019, in a 4–2 away loss against the Netherlands in the 2021 UEFA European Championship qualifiers where he replaced AC Milan's Rafael Leão.

== Career statistics ==
As of match played 3 March 2024

Club	Season	League			National cup (Note: Includes Taça de Portugal, Coppa Italia)		League cup (Note: Includes Taça da Liga)		Europe		Total	
Club	Season	Division	Apps	Goals	Apps	Goals	Apps	Goals	Apps	Goals	Apps	Goals
Sporting CP	2019–20	Primeira Liga	6	0	0	0	0	0	6 (Note: Appearances in UEFA Europa League)	1	12	1
Almería (loan)	2020–21	Segunda División	10	0	0	0	–		–		10	0
Nacional (loan)	2020–21	Primeira Liga	12	2	–		–		–		12	2
Rio Ave (loan)	2021–22	Liga Portugal 2	34	10	4	0	4	0	–		42	10
Ascoli	2022–23	Serie B	30	4	1	0	–		–		31	4
Ascoli	2023–24	Serie B	27	11	1	0	–		–		28	11
Ascoli	Total		57	15	2	0	–		–		59	15
Career total			119	27	6	0	4	0	6	1	135	28

== Honours ==
Rio Ave

- Liga Portugal 2: 2021–22
