= 2019–20 UEFA Europa League knockout phase =

Phase of the 49th UEFA Europa League

The 2019–20 UEFA Europa League knockout phase began on 20 February with the round of 32 and ended on 21 August 2020 with the final at RheinEnergieStadion in Cologne, Germany, to decide the champions of the 2019–20 UEFA Europa League. A total of 32 teams competed in the knockout phase.

Times are CET/CEST, (Note: CET (UTC+1) for dates up to 28 March 2020 (round of 32 and round of 16), and CEST (UTC+2) for dates thereafter (quarter-finals, semi-finals and final).) as listed by UEFA (local times, if different, are in parentheses).

== Qualified teams ==
The knockout phase involved 32 teams: the 24 teams which qualified as winners and runners-up of each of the twelve groups in the group stage, and the eight third-placed teams from the Champions League group stage.

=== Europa League group stage winners and runners-up ===
| Group | Winners (seeded in round of 32 draw) | Runners-up (unseeded in round of 32 draw) |
|---|---|---|
| A | (Spain) Sevilla | (Cyprus) APOEL |
| B | (Sweden) Malmö FF | (Denmark) Copenhagen |
| C | (Switzerland) Basel | (Spain) Getafe |
| D | (Austria) LASK | (Portugal) Sporting CP |
| E | (Scotland) Celtic | (Romania) CFR Cluj |
| F | (England) Arsenal | (Germany) Eintracht Frankfurt |
| G | (Portugal) Porto | (Scotland) Rangers |
| H | (Spain) Espanyol | (Bulgaria) Ludogorets Razgrad |
| I | (Belgium) Gent | (Germany) VfL Wolfsburg |
| J | (Turkey) İstanbul Başakşehir | (Italy) Roma |
| K | (Portugal) Braga | (England) Wolverhampton Wanderers |
| L | (England) Manchester United | (Netherlands) AZ |

=== Champions League group stage third-placed teams ===
| Seed | Grp | Team | Pld | W | D | L | GF | GA | GD | Pts | Seeding |
|---|---|---|---|---|---|---|---|---|---|---|---|
| 1 | H | (Netherlands) Ajax | 6 | 3 | 1 | 2 | 12 | 6 | +6 | 10 | Seeded in round of 32 draw |
| 2 | E | (Austria) Red Bull Salzburg | 6 | 2 | 1 | 3 | 16 | 13 | +3 | 7 | Seeded in round of 32 draw |
| 3 | F | (Italy) Inter Milan | 6 | 2 | 1 | 3 | 10 | 9 | +1 | 7 | Seeded in round of 32 draw |
| 4 | G | (Portugal) Benfica | 6 | 2 | 1 | 3 | 10 | 11 | −1 | 7 | Seeded in round of 32 draw |
| 5 | D | (Germany) Bayer Leverkusen | 6 | 2 | 0 | 4 | 5 | 9 | −4 | 6 | Unseeded in round of 32 draw |
| 6 | C | (Ukraine) Shakhtar Donetsk | 6 | 1 | 3 | 2 | 8 | 13 | −5 | 6 | Unseeded in round of 32 draw |
| 7 | B | (Greece) Olympiacos | 6 | 1 | 1 | 4 | 8 | 14 | −6 | 4 | Unseeded in round of 32 draw |
| 8 | A | (Belgium) Club Brugge | 6 | 0 | 3 | 3 | 4 | 12 | −8 | 3 | Unseeded in round of 32 draw |

Source: UEFA
Rules for classification: 1) Points; 2) Goal difference; 3) Goals scored; 4) Away goals scored; 5) Wins; 6) Away wins; 7) Disciplinary points; 8) Club coefficient (UCL Regulations Article 16.04).

== Format ==
Each tie in the knockout phase, apart from the final, was played over two legs, with each team playing one leg at home. The team that scored more goals on aggregate over the two legs advanced to the next round. If the aggregate score was level, the away goals rule was applied, i.e. the team that scored more goals away from home over the two legs advanced. If away goals were also equal, then extra time was played. The away goals rule was again applied after extra time, i.e. if there were goals scored during extra time and the aggregate score was still level, the visiting team advanced by more away goals scored. If no goals were scored during extra time, the winners were decided by a penalty shoot-out. In the final, which was played as a single match, if the score was level at the end of normal time, extra time was played, followed by a penalty shoot-out if the score was still level. The mechanism of the draws for each round was as follows:

- In the draw for the round of 32, the twelve group winners and the four third-placed teams from the Champions League group stage with the better group records were seeded, and the twelve group runners-up and the other four third-placed teams from the Champions League group stage were unseeded. The seeded teams were drawn against the unseeded teams, with the seeded teams hosting the second leg. Teams from the same group or the same association cannot be drawn against each other.
- In the draws for the round of 16 onwards, there were no seedings, and teams from the same group or the same association could be drawn against each other. As the draws for the quarter-finals and semi-finals were held together before the quarter-finals were played, the identity of the quarter-final winners was not known at the time of the semi-final draw. A draw was also held to determine which semi-final winner was designated as the "home" team for the final (for administrative purposes as it was played at a neutral venue).

On 17 June 2020, UEFA announced that due to the COVID-19 pandemic in Europe, the final stages of the competition would feature a format change. The quarter-finals, semi-finals, and final would be played in a single-leg format from 10 to 21 August 2020 in the German cities of Cologne, Düsseldorf, Duisburg and Gelsenkirchen. The matches were tentatively played behind closed doors, though spectators could be allowed subject to a review of the situation and the decisions of the national and local government.

Following the competition restarts in August 2020, a maximum of five substitutions were allowed, with a sixth allowed in extra time. However, each team was only given three opportunities to make substitutions, with a fourth opportunity in extra time, excluding substitutions made at half-time, before the start of extra time, and at half-time in extra time. This followed a proposal from FIFA and approval by IFAB to lessen the impact of fixture congestion.

In the knockout phase, teams from the same or nearby cities (Porto and Braga) were not scheduled to play at home on the same day, due to logistics and crowd control. Consequently, UEFA adjusted to avoid such scheduling conflicts. For the round of 32, since both teams were seeded and play at home for the second leg, the home match of the team which was not domestic cup champions in the qualifying season, or the team with the lower domestic ranking (if neither team were the domestic cup champions, e.g. Braga for this season), was moved from Thursday to Wednesday. For the round of 16, quarter-finals, and semi-finals, if the two teams were drawn to play at home for the same leg, the order of legs of the tie involving the team with the lowest priority was reversed from the original draw.

== Schedule ==
The schedule was as follows (all draws are held at the UEFA headquarters in Nyon, Switzerland).

Following the round of 16 first legs, the competition was postponed indefinitely due to the COVID-19 pandemic in Europe. The final, originally scheduled to take place on 27 May 2020, was officially postponed on 23 March 2020. A working group was set up by UEFA to decide the calendar of the remainder of the season.

Knockout phase schedule
| Round | Draw date | First leg | Second leg |
|---|---|---|---|
| Round of 32 | 16 December 2019, 13:00 | 20 February 2020 | 27 February 2020 |
| Round of 16 (Note: The two round of 16 ties which did not play their first leg were played on 5–6 August 2020.) | 28 February 2020, 13:00 | 12 March 2020 | 5–6 August 2020 (Note: Round of 16 second legs originally scheduled for 19 March 2020) |
| Quarter-finals | 10 July 2020, 13:00 (Note: The quarter-final, semi-final, and final draws were originally scheduled for 20 March 2020) | 10–11 August 2020 (Note: The quarter-final first legs were originally scheduled for 9 April, and second legs 16 April 2020) | |
| Semi-finals | 10 July 2020, 13:00 | 16–17 August 2020 (Note: The semi-final first legs were originally scheduled for 30 April, and second legs 7 May 2020) | |
| Final | 10 July 2020, 13:00 | 21 August 2020 at RheinEnergieStadion, Cologne (Note: The final was originally scheduled for 27 May 2020) | |

Matches could also be played on Tuesdays or Wednesdays instead of the regular Thursdays due to scheduling conflicts.

== Bracket ==
Round of 32
(Greece) Olympiacos (a.e.t.; a) | 0 | 2 | 2
(England) Arsenal | 1 | 1 | 2
(England) Wolverhampton Wanderers | 4 | 2 | 6
(Spain) Espanyol | 0 | 3 | 3
(Romania) CFR Cluj | 1 | 0 | 1
(Spain) Sevilla (a) | 1 | 0 | 1
(Italy) Roma | 1 | 1 | 2
(Belgium) Gent | 0 | 1 | 1
(Netherlands) AZ | 1 | 0 | 1
(Austria) LASK | 1 | 2 | 3
(Belgium) Club Brugge | 1 | 0 | 1
(England) Manchester United | 1 | 5 | 6
(Portugal) Sporting CP | 3 | 1 | 4
(Turkey) İstanbul Başakşehir (a.e.t.) | 1 | 4 | 5
(Denmark) Copenhagen | 1 | 3 | 4
(Scotland) Celtic | 1 | 1 | 2
(Bulgaria) Ludogorets Razgrad | 0 | 1 | 1
(Italy) Inter Milan | 2 | 2 | 4
(Spain) Getafe | 2 | 1 | 3
(Netherlands) Ajax | 0 | 2 | 2
(Scotland) Rangers | 3 | 1 | 4
(Portugal) Braga | 2 | 0 | 2
(Germany) Bayer Leverkusen | 2 | 3 | 5
(Portugal) Porto | 1 | 1 | 2
(Germany) VfL Wolfsburg | 2 | 3 | 5
(Sweden) Malmö FF | 1 | 0 | 1
(Ukraine) Shakhtar Donetsk | 2 | 3 | 5
(Portugal) Benfica | 1 | 3 | 4
(Germany) Eintracht Frankfurt | 4 | 2 | 6
(Austria) Red Bull Salzburg | 1 | 2 | 3
(Cyprus) APOEL | 0 | 0 | 0
(Switzerland) Basel | 3 | 1 | 4

Round of 16
(Greece) Olympiacos | 1 | 0 | 1
(England) Wolverhampton Wanderers | 1 | 1 | 2
(Spain) Sevilla | 2
(Italy) Roma | 0
(Austria) LASK | 0 | 1 | 1
(England) Manchester United | 5 | 2 | 7
(Turkey) İstanbul Başakşehir | 1 | 0 | 1
(Denmark) Copenhagen | 0 | 3 | 3
(Italy) Inter Milan | 2
(Spain) Getafe | 0
(Scotland) Rangers | 1 | 0 | 1
(Germany) Bayer Leverkusen | 3 | 1 | 4
(Germany) VfL Wolfsburg | 1 | 0 | 1
(Ukraine) Shakhtar Donetsk | 2 | 3 | 5
(Germany) Eintracht Frankfurt | 0 | 0 | 0
(Switzerland) Basel | 3 | 1 | 4

Quarter-finals
11 August – Duisburg
(England) Wolverhampton Wanderers | 0
(Spain) Sevilla | 1
10 August – Cologne
(England) Manchester United (a.e.t.) | 1
(Denmark) Copenhagen | 0
10 August – Düsseldorf
(Italy) Inter Milan | 2
(Germany) Bayer Leverkusen | 1
11 August – Gelsenkirchen
(Ukraine) Shakhtar Donetsk | 4
(Switzerland) Basel | 1

Semi-finals
16 August – Cologne
(Spain) Sevilla | 2
(England) Manchester United | 1
17 August – Düsseldorf
(Italy) Inter Milan | 5
(Ukraine) Shakhtar Donetsk | 0

Final
21 August – Cologne
(Spain) Sevilla | 3
(Italy) Inter Milan | 2

== Round of 32 ==
The draw for the round of 32 was held on 16 December 2019, 13:00 CET.

=== Summary ===
The first legs were played on 20 February, and the second legs were played on 26, 27, and 28 February 2020.

| Team 1 | Agg. | Team 2 | 1st leg | 2nd leg |
|---|---|---|---|---|
| Wolverhampton Wanderers (England) | 6–3 | (Spain) Espanyol | 4–0 | 2–3 |
| Sporting CP (Portugal) | 4–5 | (Turkey) İstanbul Başakşehir | 3–1 | 1–4 (a.e.t.) |
| Getafe (Spain) | 3–2 | (Netherlands) Ajax | 2–0 | 1–2 |
| Bayer Leverkusen (Germany) | 5–2 | (Portugal) Porto | 2–1 | 3–1 |
| Copenhagen (Denmark) | 4–2 | (Scotland) Celtic | 1–1 | 3–1 |
| APOEL (Cyprus) | 0–4 | (Switzerland) Basel | 0–3 | 0–1 |
| CFR Cluj (Romania) | 1–1 (a) | (Spain) Sevilla | 1–1 | 0–0 |
| Olympiacos (Greece) | 2–2 (a) | (England) Arsenal | 0–1 | 2–1 (a.e.t.) |
| AZ (Netherlands) | 1–3 | (Austria) LASK | 1–1 | 0–2 |
| Club Brugge (Belgium) | 1–6 | (England) Manchester United | 1–1 | 0–5 |
| Ludogorets Razgrad (Bulgaria) | 1–4 | (Italy) Inter Milan | 0–2 | 1–2 |
| Eintracht Frankfurt (Germany) | 6–3 | (Austria) Red Bull Salzburg | 4–1 | 2–2 |
| Shakhtar Donetsk (Ukraine) | 5–4 | (Portugal) Benfica | 2–1 | 3–3 |
| VfL Wolfsburg (Germany) | 5–1 | (Sweden) Malmö FF | 2–1 | 3–0 |
| Roma (Italy) | 2–1 | (Belgium) Gent | 1–0 | 1–1 |
| Rangers (Scotland) | 4–2 | (Portugal) Braga | 3–2 | 1–0 |

=== Matches ===
20 February 2020
21:00 (20:00 UTC+0)

| Wolverhampton Wanderers (England) | 4–0 | (Spain) Espanyol |
|---|---|---|
| Jota 15', 67', 81'; Neves 52' | Report |

Molineux Stadium, Wolverhampton
Attendance: 30,435
Referee: Tobias Stieler (Germany)
27 February 2020
18:55

| Espanyol (Spain) | 3–2 | (England) Wolverhampton Wanderers |
|---|---|---|
| Calleri 16', 57' (pen.), 90+1' | Report | Traoré 22'; Doherty 79' |

RCDE Stadium, Cornellà de Llobregat
Attendance: 14,525
Referee: Marco Guida (Italy)

Wolverhampton Wanderers won 6–3 on aggregate.

20 February 2020
18:55 (17:55 UTC+0)

| Sporting CP (Portugal) | 3–1 | (Turkey) İstanbul Başakşehir |
|---|---|---|
| Coates 3'; Šporar 44'; Vietto 51' | Report | Višća 77' (pen.) |

Estádio José Alvalade, Lisbon
Attendance: 27,392
Referee: Anthony Taylor (England)
27 February 2020
18:55 (20:55 UTC+3)

| İstanbul Başakşehir (Turkey) | 4–1 (a.e.t.) | (Portugal) Sporting CP |
|---|---|---|
| Škrtel 31'; Aleksić 45'; Višća 90+2', 119' (pen.) | Report | Vietto 68' |

Başakşehir Fatih Terim Stadium, Istanbul
Attendance: 5,892
Referee: Antonio Mateu Lahoz (Spain)

İstanbul Başakşehir won 5–4 on aggregate.

20 February 2020
18:55

| Getafe (Spain) | 2–0 | (Netherlands) Ajax |
|---|---|---|
| Deyverson 38'; Kenedy 90+3' | Report |

Coliseum Alfonso Pérez, Getafe
Attendance: 14,039
Referee: Ruddy Buquet (France)
27 February 2020
21:00

| Ajax (Netherlands) | 2–1 | (Spain) Getafe |
|---|---|---|
| Danilo 10'; Oliveira 63' (o.g.) | Report | Mata 5' |

Johan Cruyff Arena, Amsterdam
Attendance: 51,487
Referee: Anastasios Sidiropoulos (Greece)

Getafe won 3–2 on aggregate.

20 February 2020
21:00

| Bayer Leverkusen (Germany) | 2–1 | (Portugal) Porto |
|---|---|---|
| Alario 29'; Havertz 57' (pen.) | Report | Díaz 73' |

BayArena, Leverkusen
Attendance: 26,839
Referee: Slavko Vinčić (Slovenia)
27 February 2020
18:55 (17:55 UTC+0)

| Porto (Portugal) | 1–3 | (Germany) Bayer Leverkusen |
|---|---|---|
| Marega 65' | Report | Alario 10'; Demirbay 50'; Havertz 58' |

Estádio do Dragão, Porto
Attendance: 30,292
Referee: István Kovács (Romania)

Bayer Leverkusen won 5–2 on aggregate.

20 February 2020
18:55

| Copenhagen (Denmark) | 1–1 | (Scotland) Celtic |
|---|---|---|
| N'Doye 52' | Report | Édouard 14' |

Parken Stadium, Copenhagen
Attendance: 34,346
Referee: Sergei Karasev (Russia)
27 February 2020
21:00 (20:00 UTC+0)

| Celtic (Scotland) | 1–3 | (Denmark) Copenhagen |
|---|---|---|
| Édouard 83' (pen.) | Report | Santos 51'; Biel 85'; N'Doye 88' |

Celtic Park, Glasgow
Attendance: 56,172
Referee: Artur Soares Dias (Portugal)

Copenhagen won 4–2 on aggregate.

20 February 2020
21:00 (22:00 UTC+2)

| APOEL (Cyprus) | 0–3 | (Switzerland) Basel |
|---|---|---|
| | Report | Petretta 16'; Stocker 53'; Cabral 66' |

GSP Stadium, Nicosia
Attendance: 8,191
Referee: Orel Grinfeld (Israel)
27 February 2020
18:55

| Basel (Switzerland) | 1–0 | (Cyprus) APOEL |
|---|---|---|
| Frei 38' (pen.) | Report |

St. Jakob-Park, Basel
Attendance: 14,428
Referee: Pavel Královec (Czech Republic)

Basel won 4–0 on aggregate.

20 February 2020
18:55 (19:55 UTC+2)

| CFR Cluj (Romania) | 1–1 | (Spain) Sevilla |
|---|---|---|
| Deac 59' (pen.) | Report | En-Nesyri 82' |

Stadionul Dr. Constantin Rădulescu, Cluj-Napoca
Attendance: 14,820
Referee: Deniz Aytekin (Germany)
27 February 2020
21:00

| Sevilla (Spain) | 0–0 | (Romania) CFR Cluj |
|---|---|---|
| | Report |

Ramón Sánchez Pizjuán, Seville
Attendance: 31,338
Referee: Andris Treimanis (Latvia)

1–1 on aggregate; Sevilla won on away goals.

20 February 2020
21:00 (22:00 UTC+2)

| Olympiacos (Greece) | 0–1 | (England) Arsenal |
|---|---|---|
| | Report | Lacazette 81' |

Karaiskakis Stadium, Piraeus
Attendance: 31,456
Referee: Felix Zwayer (Germany)
27 February 2020
21:00 (20:00 UTC+0)

| Arsenal (England) | 1–2 (a.e.t.) | (Greece) Olympiacos |
|---|---|---|
| Aubameyang 113' | Report | Cissé 53'; El-Arabi 120' |

Emirates Stadium, London
Attendance: 60,242
Referee: Davide Massa (Italy)

2–2 on aggregate; Olympiacos won on away goals.

20 February 2020
21:00

| AZ (Netherlands) | 1–1 | (Austria) LASK |
|---|---|---|
| Koopmeiners 86' (pen.) | Report | Raguž 26' |

AFAS Stadion, Alkmaar
Attendance: 12,526
Referee: Mattias Gestranius (Finland)
27 February 2020
18:55

| LASK (Austria) | 2–0 | (Netherlands) AZ |
|---|---|---|
| Raguž 44' (pen.), 50' | Report |

Linzer Stadion, Linz (Note: LASK played their home matches at Linzer Stadion, Linz, instead of their regular home stadium Waldstadion, Pasching.)
Attendance: 12,855
Referee: Srđan Jovanović (Serbia)

LASK won 3–1 on aggregate.

20 February 2020
18:55

| Club Brugge (Belgium) | 1–1 | (England) Manchester United |
|---|---|---|
| Dennis 15' | Report | Martial 36' |

Jan Breydel Stadium, Bruges
Attendance: 27,006
Referee: Aleksei Kulbakov (Belarus)
27 February 2020
21:00 (20:00 UTC+0)

| Manchester United (England) | 5–0 | (Belgium) Club Brugge |
|---|---|---|
| Fernandes 27' (pen.); Ighalo 34'; McTominay 41'; Fred 82', 90+3' | Report |

Old Trafford, Manchester
Attendance: 70,397
Referee: Serdar Gözübüyük (Netherlands)

Manchester United won 6–1 on aggregate.

20 February 2020
18:55 (19:55 UTC+2)

| Ludogorets Razgrad (Bulgaria) | 0–2 | (Italy) Inter Milan |
|---|---|---|
| | Report | Eriksen 71'; Lukaku 90+5' (pen.) |

Huvepharma Arena, Razgrad
Attendance: 10,024
Referee: Carlos del Cerro Grande (Spain)
27 February 2020
21:00

| Inter Milan (Italy) | 2–1 | (Bulgaria) Ludogorets Razgrad |
|---|---|---|
| Biraghi 32'; Lukaku 45+4' | Report | Cauly 26' |

San Siro, Milan
Attendance: 0 (Note: The Inter Milan v Ludogorets Razgrad match was played behind closed doors due to the COVID-19 pandemic in Italy.)
Referee: Daniel Siebert (Germany)

Inter Milan won 4–1 on aggregate.

20 February 2020
18:55

| Eintracht Frankfurt (Germany) | 4–1 | (Austria) Red Bull Salzburg |
|---|---|---|
| Kamada 12', 43', 53'; Kostić 56' | Report | Hwang Hee-chan 85' (pen.) |

Waldstadion, Frankfurt
Attendance: 47,000
Referee: Ali Palabıyık (Turkey)
28 February 2020 (Note: The Red Bull Salzburg v Eintracht Frankfurt match, originally scheduled to be played on 27 February 2020, 21:00, was postponed to 28 February 2020, 18:00 CET, due to a storm warning.)
18:00

| Red Bull Salzburg (Austria) | 2–2 | (Germany) Eintracht Frankfurt |
|---|---|---|
| Ulmer 10'; Onguéné 72' | Report | Silva 30', 83' |

Stadion Wals-Siezenheim, Wals-Siezenheim
Attendance: 29,000
Referee: Benoît Bastien (France)

Eintracht Frankfurt won 6–3 on aggregate.

20 February 2020
18:55 (19:55 UTC+2)

| Shakhtar Donetsk (Ukraine) | 2–1 | (Portugal) Benfica |
|---|---|---|
| Alan Patrick 56'; Kovalenko 72' | Report | Pizzi 67' (pen.) |

Metalist Stadium, Kharkiv (Note: Shakhtar Donetsk played their round of 32 home match at Metalist Stadium, Kharkiv, and round of 16 home match at NSC Olimpiyskiy Stadium, Kyiv, instead of their regular home stadium, the Donbas Arena in Donetsk, due to the war in Donbas.)
Attendance: 24,429
Referee: Bobby Madden (Scotland)
27 February 2020
21:00 (20:00 UTC+0)

| Benfica (Portugal) | 3–3 | (Ukraine) Shakhtar Donetsk |
|---|---|---|
| Pizzi 9'; Dias 36'; Silva 47' | Report | Dias 12' (o.g.); Stepanenko 49'; Alan Patrick 71' |

Estádio da Luz, Lisbon
Attendance: 48,302
Referee: Björn Kuipers (Netherlands)

Shakhtar Donetsk won 5–4 on aggregate.

20 February 2020
21:00

| VfL Wolfsburg (Germany) | 2–1 | (Sweden) Malmö FF |
|---|---|---|
| Brekalo 49'; Kiese Thelin 62' (o.g.) | Report | Kiese Thelin 47' (pen.) |

Volkswagen Arena, Wolfsburg
Attendance: 13,801
Referee: Gediminas Mažeika (Lithuania)
27 February 2020
18:55

| Malmö FF (Sweden) | 0–3 | (Germany) VfL Wolfsburg |
|---|---|---|
| | Report | Brekalo 42'; Gerhardt 65'; João Victor 69' |

Eleda Stadion, Malmö
Attendance: 20,500
Referee: Willie Collum (Scotland)

VfL Wolfsburg won 5–1 on aggregate.

20 February 2020
21:00

| Roma (Italy) | 1–0 | (Belgium) Gent |
|---|---|---|
| Pérez 13' | Report |

Stadio Olimpico, Rome
Attendance: 28,248
Referee: Georgi Kabakov (Bulgaria)
27 February 2020
18:55

| Gent (Belgium) | 1–1 | (Italy) Roma |
|---|---|---|
| David 25' | Report | Kluivert 29' |

Ghelamco Arena, Ghent
Attendance: 17,557
Referee: José María Sánchez Martínez (Spain)

Roma won 2–1 on aggregate.

20 February 2020
21:00 (20:00 UTC+0)

| Rangers (Scotland) | 3–2 | (Portugal) Braga |
|---|---|---|
| Hagi 67', 82'; Aribo 75' | Report | Fransérgio 11'; Ruiz 59' |

Ibrox Stadium, Glasgow
Attendance: 49,378
Referee: Xavier Estrada Fernández (Spain)
26 February 2020 (Note: The Braga v Rangers match was rescheduled to 26 February 2020 in order to avoid a scheduling conflict with the Porto v Bayer Leverkusen match.)
18:00 (17:00 UTC+0)

| Braga (Portugal) | 0–1 | (Scotland) Rangers |
|---|---|---|
| | Report | Kent 61' |

Estádio Municipal, Braga
Attendance: 18,113
Referee: Andreas Ekberg (Sweden)

Rangers won 4–2 on aggregate.

== Round of 16 ==
The draw for the round of 16 was held on 28 February 2020, 13:00 CET.

=== Summary ===
Six of the eight first leg matches were played on 12 March, while the remaining first legs and all second leg fixtures were postponed by UEFA due to concerns over the COVID-19 pandemic in Europe. On 17 June 2020, UEFA announced that the second legs would be played on 5–6 August 2020. In July 2020, they confirmed that the second legs would be played at the home team's stadium as normal. For the two ties that had not played their first legs, the matches were instead played in a single-leg format, at neutral venues in Germany.

| Team 1 | Agg. | Team 2 | 1st leg | 2nd leg |
|---|---|---|---|---|
| İstanbul Başakşehir (Turkey) | 1–3 | (Denmark) Copenhagen | 1–0 | 0–3 |
| Olympiacos (Greece) | 1–2 | (England) Wolverhampton Wanderers | 1–1 | 0–1 |
| Rangers (Scotland) | 1–4 | (Germany) Bayer Leverkusen | 1–3 | 0–1 |
| VfL Wolfsburg (Germany) | 1–5 | (Ukraine) Shakhtar Donetsk | 1–2 | 0–3 |
| Inter Milan (Italy) | 2–0 | (Spain) Getafe | | |
| Sevilla (Spain) | 2–0 | (Italy) Roma | | |
| Eintracht Frankfurt (Germany) | 0–4 | (Switzerland) Basel | 0–3 | 0–1 |
| LASK (Austria) | 1–7 | (England) Manchester United | 0–5 | 1–2 |

=== Matches ===
12 March 2020
18:55 (20:55 UTC+3)

| İstanbul Başakşehir (Turkey) | 1–0 | (Denmark) Copenhagen |
|---|---|---|
| Višća 88' (pen.) | Report |

Başakşehir Fatih Terim Stadium, Istanbul
Attendance: 12,205
Referee: Willie Collum (Scotland)
5 August 2020 (Note: All of the round of 16 second leg matches, originally scheduled to be played on 19 March 2020, were postponed following the suspension of UEFA competitions due to the COVID-19 pandemic in Europe.)
18:55

| Copenhagen (Denmark) | 3–0 | (Turkey) İstanbul Başakşehir |
|---|---|---|
| Wind 4', 53' (pen.); Falk 62' | Report |

Parken Stadium, Copenhagen
Attendance: 0 (Note: The match was played behind closed doors due to the COVID-19 pandemic)
Referee: Daniele Orsato (Italy)

Copenhagen won 3–1 on aggregate.

12 March 2020
21:00 (22:00 UTC+2)

| Olympiacos (Greece) | 1–1 | (England) Wolverhampton Wanderers |
|---|---|---|
| El-Arabi 54' | Report | Neto 67' |

Karaiskakis Stadium, Piraeus
Attendance: 0 (Note: The Olympiacos v Wolverhampton Wanderers match was played behind closed doors due to the COVID-19 pandemic in Greece.)
Referee: Clément Turpin (France)
6 August 2020
21:00 (20:00 UTC+1)

| Wolverhampton Wanderers (England) | 1–0 | (Greece) Olympiacos |
|---|---|---|
| Jiménez 9' (pen.) | Report |

Molineux Stadium, Wolverhampton
Attendance: 0
Referee: Szymon Marciniak (Poland)

Wolverhampton Wanderers won 2–1 on aggregate.

12 March 2020
21:00 (20:00 UTC+0)

| Rangers (Scotland) | 1–3 | (Germany) Bayer Leverkusen |
|---|---|---|
| Edmundson 75' | Report | Havertz 37' (pen.); Aránguiz 67'; Bailey 88' |

Ibrox Stadium, Glasgow
Attendance: 47,494
Referee: Szymon Marciniak (Poland)
6 August 2020
18:55

| Bayer Leverkusen (Germany) | 1–0 | (Scotland) Rangers |
|---|---|---|
| Diaby 51' | Report |

BayArena, Leverkusen
Attendance: 0
Referee: Danny Makkelie (Netherlands)

Bayer Leverkusen won 4–1 on aggregate.

12 March 2020
21:00

| VfL Wolfsburg (Germany) | 1–2 | (Ukraine) Shakhtar Donetsk |
|---|---|---|
| Brooks 48' | Report | Júnior Moraes 17'; Marcos Antônio 73' |

Volkswagen Arena, Wolfsburg
Attendance: 0 (Note: The VfL Wolfsburg v Shakhtar Donetsk match was played behind closed doors due to the COVID-19 pandemic in Germany.)
Referee: Damir Skomina (Slovenia)
5 August 2020
18:55 (19:55 UTC+3)

| Shakhtar Donetsk (Ukraine) | 3–0 | (Germany) VfL Wolfsburg |
|---|---|---|
| Júnior Moraes 89', 90+3'; Solomon 90+1' | Report |

NSC Olimpiyskiy Stadium, Kyiv (Note: The Shakhtar Donetsk v VfL Wolfsburg match, originally scheduled to be played at Metalist Stadium, Kharkiv, prior to the suspension of the tournament, was later moved to NSC Olimpiyskiy Stadium, Kyiv.)
Attendance: 0
Referee: Ivan Kružliak (Slovakia)

Shakhtar Donetsk won 5–1 on aggregate.

5 August 2020 (Note: The first leg of the Inter Milan v Getafe tie, originally scheduled to be played on 12 March 2020, 21:00, at San Siro, Milan, was postponed due to the COVID-19 pandemic in Italy and subsequent travel restrictions. The second leg, originally scheduled for 19 March 2020, 18:55 CET at Coliseum Alfonso Pérez, Getafe, was subsequently postponed. UEFA later decided to stage the tie as a single-leg match, to be played at a neutral venue in Germany.)
21:00

| Inter Milan (Italy) | 2–0 | (Spain) Getafe |
|---|---|---|
| Lukaku 33'; Eriksen 83' | Report |

Veltins-Arena, Gelsenkirchen
Attendance: 0
Referee: Anthony Taylor (England)

6 August 2020 (Note: The first leg of the Sevilla v Roma tie, originally scheduled to be played on 12 March 2020, 18:55, at Ramón Sánchez Pizjuán Stadium, Seville, was postponed date due to the COVID-19 pandemic in Spain and subsequent travel restrictions. The second leg, originally scheduled for 19 March 2020, 21:00 CET at Stadio Olimpico, Rome, was subsequently postponed. UEFA later decided to stage the tie as a single-leg match, to be played at a neutral venue in Germany.)
18:55

| Sevilla (Spain) | 2–0 | (Italy) Roma |
|---|---|---|
| Reguilón 22'; En-Nesyri 44' | Report |

MSV-Arena, Duisburg
Attendance: 0
Referee: Björn Kuipers (Netherlands)

12 March 2020
18:55

| Eintracht Frankfurt (Germany) | 0–3 | (Switzerland) Basel |
|---|---|---|
| | Report | Campo 27'; Bua 73'; Frei 85' |

Waldstadion, Frankfurt
Attendance: 0 (Note: The Eintracht Frankfurt v Basel match was played behind closed doors due to the COVID-19 pandemic in Germany.)
Referee: Andreas Ekberg (Sweden)
6 August 2020
21:00

| Basel (Switzerland) | 1–0 | (Germany) Eintracht Frankfurt |
|---|---|---|
| Frei 88' | Report |

St. Jakob-Park, Basel
Attendance: 0
Referee: Antonio Mateu Lahoz (Spain)

Basel won 4–0 on aggregate.

12 March 2020
18:55

| LASK (Austria) | 0–5 | (England) Manchester United |
|---|---|---|
| | Report | Ighalo 28'; James 58'; Mata 82'; Greenwood 90+2'; Pereira 90+3' |

Linzer Stadion, Linz
Attendance: 0 (Note: The LASK v Manchester United match was played behind closed doors due to the COVID-19 pandemic in Austria.)
Referee: Artur Soares Dias (Portugal)
5 August 2020
21:00 (20:00 UTC+1)

| Manchester United (England) | 2–1 | (Austria) LASK |
|---|---|---|
| Lingard 57'; Martial 88' | Report | Wiesinger 55' |

Old Trafford, Manchester
Attendance: 0
Referee: Anastasios Sidiropoulos (Greece)

Manchester United won 7–1 on aggregate.

== Quarter-finals ==
The draw for the quarter-finals took place on 10 July 2020.

=== Summary ===
The matches were played on 10 and 11 August 2020.

| Team 1 | Score | Team 2 |
|---|---|---|
| Shakhtar Donetsk (Ukraine) | 4–1 | (Switzerland) Basel |
| Manchester United (England) | 1–0 (a.e.t.) | (Denmark) Copenhagen |
| Inter Milan (Italy) | 2–1 | (Germany) Bayer Leverkusen |
| Wolverhampton Wanderers (England) | 0–1 | (Spain) Sevilla |

=== Matches ===
11 August 2020
21:00

| Shakhtar Donetsk (Ukraine) | 4–1 | (Switzerland) Basel |
|---|---|---|
| Júnior Moraes 2'; Taison 22'; Alan Patrick 75' (pen.); Dodô 88' | Report | Van Wolfswinkel 90+2' |

Arena AufSchalke, Gelsenkirchen
Attendance: 0
Referee: Michael Oliver (England)

10 August 2020
21:00

| Manchester United (England) | 1–0 (a.e.t.) | (Denmark) Copenhagen |
|---|---|---|
| Fernandes 95' (pen.) | Report |

RheinEnergieStadion, Cologne
Attendance: 0
Referee: Clément Turpin (France)

10 August 2020
21:00

| Inter Milan (Italy) | 2–1 | (Germany) Bayer Leverkusen |
|---|---|---|
| Barella 15'; Lukaku 21' | Report | Havertz 25' |

Merkur Spiel-Arena, Düsseldorf
Attendance: 0
Referee: Carlos del Cerro Grande (Spain)

11 August 2020
21:00

| Wolverhampton Wanderers (England) | 0–1 | (Spain) Sevilla |
|---|---|---|
| | Report | Ocampos 88' |

MSV-Arena, Duisburg
Attendance: 0
Referee: Daniele Orsato (Italy)

== Semi-finals ==
The draw for the semi-finals took place on 10 July 2020 (after the quarter-final draw).

=== Summary ===
The matches were played on 16 and 17 August 2020.

| Team 1 | Score | Team 2 |
|---|---|---|
| Sevilla (Spain) | 2–1 | (England) Manchester United |
| Inter Milan (Italy) | 5–0 | (Ukraine) Shakhtar Donetsk |

=== Matches ===
16 August 2020
21:00

| Sevilla (Spain) | 2–1 | (England) Manchester United |
|---|---|---|
| Suso 26'; De Jong 78' | Report | Fernandes 9' (pen.) |

RheinEnergieStadion, Cologne
Attendance: 0
Referee: Felix Brych (Germany)

17 August 2020
21:00

| Inter Milan (Italy) | 5–0 | (Ukraine) Shakhtar Donetsk |
|---|---|---|
| Martínez 19', 74'; D'Ambrosio 64'; Lukaku 78', 84' | Report |

Merkur Spiel-Arena, Düsseldorf
Attendance: 0
Referee: Szymon Marciniak (Poland)

== Final ==
The final was played at the RheinEnergieStadion in Cologne. The "home" team (for administrative purposes) was determined by an additional draw held after the quarter-final and semi-final draws.

21 August 2020
21:00

| Sevilla (Spain) | 3–2 | (Italy) Inter Milan |
|---|---|---|
| De Jong 12', 33'; Lukaku 74' (o.g.) | Report | Lukaku 5' (pen.); Godín 36' |

RheinEnergieStadion, Cologne
Attendance: 0 (Note: The remainder of the competition, held in August 2020, was played behind closed doors due to the COVID-19 pandemic in Europe.)
Referee: Danny Makkelie (Netherlands)
