= Pablo Pérez (footballer, born 2001) =

Spanish footballer (born 2001)

Personal information
- Full name: Pablo Pérez Rico
- Date of birth: 18 August 2001 (age 25)
- Place of birth: Madrid Spain
- Height: 1.74 m (5 ft 9 in)
- Position: Left-back

Team information
- Current team: Mirandés
- Number: 17

Youth career
- Fortaleza CEIF
- 2017–2018: Levante
- 2018–2019: Nervión
- 2019–2020: Sevilla

Senior career*
Years	Team	Apps	(Gls)
2020–2023	Sevilla B	52	(2)
2023–2026	Atlético Madrid B	63	(2)
2025–2026	→ Mirandés (loan)	27	(0)
2026–	Mirandés	0	(0)

International career
2020	Spain U19	1	(0)
- * Club domestic league appearances and goals as of 9 June 2026

Pablo Pérez Rico (born 18 August 2001) is a Spanish footballer who plays as a left-back for CD Mirandés.

== Club career ==
=== Sevilla ===
Pérez was born in Madrid, but moved to Colombia at early age due to his family's work. There, he played for a number of teams, including Fortaleza CEIF before returning to his home country and staying in Valencia for a year, where he represented Levante UD. In 2018, as his family moved to Seville, he joined AD Nervión, playing as a winger before joining Sevilla FC in 2019.

Initially assigned to the Juvenil A squad, Pérez was converted into a left back during the 2019–20 season, while also training with the first team. He made his senior debut with the reserves on 31 January 2021, playing the last 17 minutes in a 1–1 Segunda División B home draw against Real Murcia CF.

=== Atlético Madrid ===
On 23 August 2023, after failing to make a breakthrough in his first team, Pérez signed a two-year contract with Atlético Madrid and was assigned to the B-team in Primera Federación. On 10 July of the following year, he renewed his link until 2027.

On 31 July 2025, Pérez moved to Segunda División side CD Mirandés on loan for one year.

== Style of play ==
A left-back, Pérez has received comparisons to Spain international Jordi Alba.

== Personal life ==
Pérez studied engineering. He is related to Spanish handball player Lorenzo Rico.

== Honours ==
Sevilla

- UEFA Europa League: 2019–20
