= 2019–20 UEFA Europa League group stage =

Football tournament group stage

The 2019–20 UEFA Europa League group stage began on 19 September and ended on 12 December 2019. A total of 48 teams competed in the group stage to decide 24 of the 32 places in the knockout phase of the 2019–20 UEFA Europa League.

== Draw ==
The draw for the group stage was held on 30 August 2019, 13:00 CEST, at the Grimaldi Forum in Monaco.

The 48 teams were drawn into twelve groups of four, with the restriction that teams from the same association could not be drawn against each other. For the draw, the teams were seeded into four pots based on their 2019 UEFA club coefficients.

On 17 July 2014, the UEFA emergency panel ruled that Ukrainian and Russian clubs would not be drawn against each other "until further notice" due to the political unrest between the countries.

Moreover, for associations with two or more teams, teams were paired in order to split them into two sets of six groups (A–F, G–L) for maximum television coverage. The following pairings were announced by UEFA after the group stage teams were confirmed:

- (Spain) Sevilla and Espanyol
- (England) Arsenal and Manchester United
- (Italy) Roma and Lazio
- (Germany) Borussia Mönchengladbach and Eintracht Frankfurt
- (France) Saint-Étienne and Rennes
- (Russia) CSKA Moscow and Krasnodar
- (Portugal) Porto and Sporting CP
- (Portugal) Braga and Vitória de Guimarães
- (Ukraine) Dynamo Kyiv and Oleksandriya
- (Belgium) Gent and Standard Liège
- (Turkey) Beşiktaş and Trabzonspor
- (Netherlands) PSV Eindhoven and Feyenoord
- (Austria) LASK and Wolfsberger AC
- (Switzerland) Basel and Young Boys
- (Scotland) Celtic and Rangers

On each matchday, one set of six groups play their matches at 18:55 CET/CEST, while the other set of six groups play their matches at 21:00 CET/CEST, with the two sets of groups alternating between each matchday. The fixtures were decided after the draw, using a computer draw not shown to public, with the following match sequence (Regulations Article 15.02):

Group stage schedule
Matchday	Date	Matches (Note: Positions for scheduling do not use the seeding pots, e.g. Team 1 is not necessarily the team from Pot 1 in the draw.)
Matchday 1	19 September 2019	2 v 3, 4 v 1
Matchday 2	3 October 2019	1 v 2, 3 v 4
Matchday 3	24 October 2019	3 v 1, 2 v 4
Matchday 4	6–7 November 2019	1 v 3, 4 v 2
Matchday 5	28 November 2019	3 v 2, 1 v 4
Matchday 6	12 December 2019	2 v 1, 4 v 3

There were scheduling restrictions: for example, teams from the same city (e.g. Lazio and Roma) in general were not scheduled to play at home on the same matchday (to avoid them playing at home on the same day, due to logistics and crowd control), and teams from "winter countries" (e.g. Russia) were not scheduled to play at home on the last matchday (due to cold weather).

== Teams ==
Below were the participating teams (with their 2019 UEFA club coefficients), grouped by their seeding pot. They included:

- 17 teams which entered in the group stage
- 21 winners of the play-off round (8 from Champions Path, 13 from Main Path)
- 6 losers of the Champions League play-off round (4 from Champions Path, 2 from League Path)
- 4 League Path losers of the Champions League third qualifying round

Key to colours
Group winners and runners-up advanced to round of 32

Pot 1
Team	Notes	Coeff.
(Spain) Sevilla		104.000
(England) Arsenal		101.000
(Portugal) Porto		93.000
(Italy) Roma		81.000
(England) Manchester United		78.000
(Ukraine) Dynamo Kyiv		65.000
(Turkey) Beşiktaş		62.000
(Switzerland) Basel		54.500
(Portugal) Sporting CP		50.000
(Russia) CSKA Moscow		48.000
(Germany) VfL Wolfsburg		40.000
(Italy) Lazio		37.000

Pot 2
Team	Notes	Coeff.
(Netherlands) PSV Eindhoven		37.000
(Russia) Krasnodar		34.500
(Scotland) Celtic		31.000
(Denmark) Copenhagen		31.000
(Portugal) Braga		31.000
(Belgium) Gent		29.500
(Germany) Borussia Mönchengladbach		29.000
(Switzerland) Young Boys		27.500
(Kazakhstan) Astana		27.500
(Bulgaria) Ludogorets Razgrad		27.000
(Cyprus) APOEL		25.500
(Germany) Eintracht Frankfurt		24.000

Pot 3
Team	Notes	Coeff.
(France) Saint-Étienne		23.000
(Azerbaijan) Qarabağ		22.000
(Netherlands) Feyenoord		22.000
(Spain) Getafe		20.713
(Spain) Espanyol		20.713
(Sweden) Malmö FF		20.000
(Serbia) Partizan		18.000
(Belgium) Standard Liège		17.500
(England) Wolverhampton Wanderers		17.092
(France) Rennes		11.699
(Norway) Rosenborg		11.500
(Turkey) İstanbul Başakşehir		10.500

Pot 4
Team	Notes	Coeff.
(Netherlands) AZ		10.500
(Portugal) Vitória de Guimarães		9.646
(Turkey) Trabzonspor		8.000
(Ukraine) Oleksandriya		7.780
(Luxembourg) F91 Dudelange		6.250
(Austria) LASK		6.250
(Austria) Wolfsberger AC		6.250
(Slovakia) Slovan Bratislava		6.000
(Switzerland) Lugano		6.000
(Scotland) Rangers		5.250
(Romania) CFR Cluj		3.500
(Hungary) Ferencváros		3.500

Notes

1. ^{EL-CP} Winners of play-off round (Champions Path).
2. ^{EL-MP} Winners of play-off round (Main Path).
3. ^{CL-CP} Losers of Champions League play-off round (Champions Path).
4. ^{CL-LP} Losers of Champions League play-off round (League Path).
5. ^{CL-LQ} Losers of Champions League third qualifying round (League Path).

== Format ==
In each group, teams played against each other home-and-away in a round-robin format. The group winners and runners-up advanced to the round of 32, where they were joined by the eight third-placed teams of the Champions League group stage.

=== Tiebreakers ===
Teams were ranked according to points (3 points for a win, 1 point for a draw, 0 points for a loss), and if tied on points, the following tiebreaking criteria were applied, in the order given, to determine the rankings (Regulations Articles 16.01):

1. Points in head-to-head matches among tied teams;
2. Goal difference in head-to-head matches among tied teams;
3. Goals scored in head-to-head matches among tied teams;
4. Away goals scored in head-to-head matches among tied teams;
5. If more than two teams were tied, and after applying all head-to-head criteria above, a subset of teams were still tied, all head-to-head criteria above were reapplied exclusively to this subset of teams;
6. Goal difference in all group matches;
7. Goals scored in all group matches;
8. Away goals scored in all group matches;
9. Wins in all group matches;
10. Away wins in all group matches;
11. Disciplinary points (red card = 3 points, yellow card = 1 point, expulsion for two yellow cards in one match = 3 points);
12. UEFA club coefficient.

== Groups ==
The matchdays were 19 September, 3 October, 24 October, 7 November, 28 November, and 12 December 2019. The scheduled kickoff times were 18:55 and 21:00 CET/CEST, with possible exceptions at 16:50 CET/CEST due to geographical reasons.

Times are CET/CEST, (Note: CEST (UTC+2) for dates up to 26 October 2019 (matchdays 1–3), and CET (UTC+1) for dates thereafter (matchdays 4–6).) as listed by UEFA (local times, if different, are in parentheses).

=== Group A ===
Pos	Team	Pld	W	D	L	GF	GA	GD	Pts	Qualification	SEV	APO	QRB	DUD
1	(Spain) Sevilla	6	5	0	1	14	3	+11	15	Advance to knockout phase	—	1–0	2–0	3–0
2	(Cyprus) APOEL	6	3	1	2	10	8	+2	10	Advance to knockout phase	1–0	—	2–1	3–4
3	(Azerbaijan) Qarabağ	6	1	2	3	8	11	−3	5		0–3	2–2	—	1–1
4	(Luxembourg) F91 Dudelange	6	1	1	4	8	18	−10	4		2–5	0–2	1–4	—

Source: UEFA
Rules for classification: Group stage tiebreakers
19 September 2019
18:55 (20:55 UTC+4)

Qarabağ (Azerbaijan)	0–3	(Spain) Sevilla
	Report	Hernández 62'; Munir 78'; Torres 85'

Tofiq Bahramov Republican Stadium, Baku (Note: Qarabağ played their home matches at Tofiq Bahramov Republican Stadium, Baku, instead of their regular stadium Azersun Arena, Baku.)
Attendance: 30,826
Referee: Yevhen Aranovskyi (Ukraine)
19 September 2019
18:55 (19:55 UTC+3)

APOEL (Cyprus)	3–4	(Luxembourg) F91 Dudelange
Pavlović 54', 58'; De Vincenti 56' (pen.)	Report	Sinani 36', 82'; Bernier 51'; Stolz 72'

GSP Stadium, Nicosia
Attendance: 9,313
Referee: Dumitru Muntean (Moldova)

3 October 2019
21:00

F91 Dudelange (Luxembourg)	1–4	(Azerbaijan) Qarabağ
Bernier 90'	Report	Zoubir 11'; Míchel 30'; Almeida 37' (pen.); Quintana 69'

Stade Josy Barthel, Luxembourg City (Note: F91 Dudelange played their home matches at Stade Josy Barthel, Luxembourg City, instead of their regular stadium Stade Jos Nosbaum, Dudelange.)
Attendance: 3,005
Referee: John Beaton (Scotland)
3 October 2019
21:00

Sevilla (Spain)	1–0	(Cyprus) APOEL
Hernández 17'	Report

Ramón Sánchez Pizjuán, Seville
Attendance: 30,008
Referee: Bas Nijhuis (Netherlands)

24 October 2019
18:55 (20:55 UTC+4)

Qarabağ (Azerbaijan)	2–2	(Cyprus) APOEL
Quintana 13'; Ailton 58'	Report	Medvedev 29' (o.g.); Hallenius 45'

Tofiq Bahramov Republican Stadium, Baku
Attendance: 30,824
Referee: Filip Glova (Slovakia)
24 October 2019
21:00

Sevilla (Spain)	3–0	(Luxembourg) F91 Dudelange
Vázquez 48', 75'; Munir 78'	Report

Ramón Sánchez Pizjuán, Seville
Attendance: 26,165
Referee: Anastasios Papapetrou (Greece)

7 November 2019
18:55

F91 Dudelange (Luxembourg)	2–5	(Spain) Sevilla
Sinani 69', 80'	Report	Dabbur 17', 36'; Munir 27', 33', 67'

Stade Josy Barthel, Luxembourg City
Attendance: 2,848
Referee: Vilhjálmur Thórarinsson (Iceland)
7 November 2019
18:55 (19:55 UTC+2)

APOEL (Cyprus)	2–1	(Azerbaijan) Qarabağ
Souza 59'; Ioannou 88'	Report	Medvedev 10'

GSP Stadium, Nicosia
Attendance: 9,432
Referee: Manuel Schüttengruber (Austria)

28 November 2019
21:00

Sevilla (Spain)	2–0	(Azerbaijan) Qarabağ
Gil 61'; Dabbur 90+2'	Report

Ramón Sánchez Pizjuán, Seville
Attendance: 19,803
Referee: Mohammed Al-Hakim (Sweden)
28 November 2019
21:00

F91 Dudelange (Luxembourg)	0–2	(Cyprus) APOEL
	Report	Matić 12' (pen.); Merkis 43'

Stade Josy Barthel, Luxembourg City
Attendance: 2,912
Referee: Gianluca Rocchi (Italy)

12 December 2019
18:55 (21:55 UTC+4)

Qarabağ (Azerbaijan)	1–1	(Luxembourg) F91 Dudelange
Gueye 90+1'	Report	Bougrine 63'

Tofiq Bahramov Republican Stadium, Baku
Attendance: 5,823
Referee: Kristo Tohver (Estonia)
12 December 2019
18:55 (19:55 UTC+2)

APOEL (Cyprus)	1–0	(Spain) Sevilla
Savić 61'	Report

GSP Stadium, Nicosia
Attendance: 5,608
Referee: Nikola Dabanović (Montenegro)

=== Group B ===
Pos	Team	Pld	W	D	L	GF	GA	GD	Pts	Qualification	MAL	KOB	DKV	LUG
1	(Sweden) Malmö FF	6	3	2	1	8	6	+2	11	Advance to knockout phase	—	1–1	4–3	2–1
2	(Denmark) Copenhagen	6	2	3	1	5	4	+1	9	Advance to knockout phase	0–1	—	1–1	1–0
3	(Ukraine) Dynamo Kyiv	6	1	4	1	7	7	0	7		1–0	1–1	—	1–1
4	(Switzerland) Lugano	6	0	3	3	2	5	−3	3		0–0	0–1	0–0	—

Source: UEFA
Rules for classification: Group stage tiebreakers
19 September 2019
18:55 (19:55 UTC+3)

Dynamo Kyiv (Ukraine)	1–0	(Sweden) Malmö FF
Buyalskyi 84'	Report

NSC Olimpiyskiy Stadium, Kyiv
Attendance: 17,159
Referee: Aleksandar Stavrev (North Macedonia)
19 September 2019
18:55

Copenhagen (Denmark)	1–0	(Switzerland) Lugano
Santos 50'	Report

Parken Stadium, Copenhagen
Attendance: 18,240
Referee: Fábio Veríssimo (Portugal)

3 October 2019
21:00

Lugano (Switzerland)	0–0	(Ukraine) Dynamo Kyiv
	Report

Kybunpark, St. Gallen (Note: Lugano played their home matches at Kybunpark, St. Gallen, instead of their regular stadium Cornaredo Stadium, Lugano, which did not meet UEFA requirements.)
Attendance: 1,281
Referee: Karim Abed (France)
3 October 2019
21:00

Malmö FF (Sweden)	1–1	(Denmark) Copenhagen
Rosenberg 55'	Report	Nielsen 45+5' (o.g.)

Eleda Stadion, Malmö
Attendance: 19,884
Referee: Deniz Aytekin (Germany)

24 October 2019
21:00

Malmö FF (Sweden)	2–1	(Switzerland) Lugano
Berget 13' (pen.); Molins 32'	Report	Gerndt 50'

Eleda Stadion, Malmö
Attendance: 16,789
Referee: Rob Harvey (Republic of Ireland)
24 October 2019
21:00 (22:00 UTC+3)

Dynamo Kyiv (Ukraine)	1–1	(Denmark) Copenhagen
Shabanov 53'	Report	Sotiriou 2'

NSC Olimpiyskiy Stadium, Kyiv
Attendance: 21,202
Referee: Halil Umut Meler (Turkey)

7 November 2019
18:55

Lugano (Switzerland)	0–0	(Sweden) Malmö FF
	Report

Kybunpark, St. Gallen
Attendance: 1,875
Referee: Giorgi Kruashvili (Georgia)
7 November 2019
18:55

Copenhagen (Denmark)	1–1	(Ukraine) Dynamo Kyiv
Stage 4'	Report	Verbič 70'

Parken Stadium, Copenhagen
Attendance: 23,166
Referee: Tamás Bognár (Hungary)

28 November 2019
21:00

Malmö FF (Sweden)	4–3	(Ukraine) Dynamo Kyiv
Bengtsson 2'; Rosenberg 48', 90+6'; Rakip 57'	Report	Mykolenko 18'; Tsyhankov 39'; Verbič 77'

Eleda Stadion, Malmö
Attendance: 19,224
Referee: Pavel Královec (Czech Republic)
28 November 2019
21:00

Lugano (Switzerland)	0–1	(Denmark) Copenhagen
	Report	Thomsen 27'

Kybunpark, St. Gallen
Attendance: 1,281
Referee: Aleksei Eskov (Russia)

12 December 2019
18:55 (19:55 UTC+2)

Dynamo Kyiv (Ukraine)	1–1	(Switzerland) Lugano
Tsyhankov 90+4'	Report	Aratore 45'

NSC Olimpiyskiy Stadium, Kyiv
Attendance: 15,774
Referee: Aliyar Aghayev (Azerbaijan)
12 December 2019
18:55

Copenhagen (Denmark)	0–1	(Sweden) Malmö FF
	Report	Papagiannopoulos 77' (o.g.)

Parken Stadium, Copenhagen
Attendance: 32,941
Referee: Davide Massa (Italy)

=== Group C ===
Pos	Team	Pld	W	D	L	GF	GA	GD	Pts	Qualification	BSL	GET	KRA	TRA
1	(Switzerland) Basel	6	4	1	1	12	4	+8	13	Advance to knockout phase	—	2–1	5–0	2–0
2	(Spain) Getafe	6	4	0	2	8	4	+4	12	Advance to knockout phase	0–1	—	3–0	1–0
3	(Russia) Krasnodar	6	3	0	3	7	11	−4	9		1–0	1–2	—	3–1
4	(Turkey) Trabzonspor	6	0	1	5	3	11	−8	1		2–2	0–1	0–2	—

Source: UEFA
Rules for classification: Group stage tiebreakers
19 September 2019
18:55

Getafe (Spain)	1–0	(Turkey) Trabzonspor
Ángel 18'	Report

Coliseum Alfonso Pérez, Getafe
Attendance: 5,786
Referee: Matej Jug (Slovenia)
19 September 2019
18:55

Basel (Switzerland)	5–0	(Russia) Krasnodar
Bua 9', 40'; Zuffi 52'; Vilhena 55' (o.g.); Okafor 79'	Report

St. Jakob-Park, Basel
Attendance: 14,127
Referee: Mattias Gestranius (Finland)

3 October 2019
21:00 (22:00 UTC+3)

Krasnodar (Russia)	1–2	(Spain) Getafe
Ari 69'	Report	Ángel 36', 61'

Krasnodar Stadium, Krasnodar
Attendance: 20,035
Referee: Ivan Bebek (Croatia)
3 October 2019
21:00 (22:00 UTC+3)

Trabzonspor (Turkey)	2–2	(Switzerland) Basel
Parmak 26'; Sosa 78'	Report	Widmer 20'; Okafor 80'

Şenol Güneş Stadium, Trabzon
Attendance: 23,867
Referee: Marco Di Bello (Italy)

24 October 2019
21:00 (22:00 UTC+3)

Trabzonspor (Turkey)	0–2	(Russia) Krasnodar
	Report	Berg 49'; Vilhena 90+2'

Şenol Güneş Stadium, Trabzon
Attendance: 26,405
Referee: Harald Lechner (Austria)
24 October 2019
21:00

Getafe (Spain)	0–1	(Switzerland) Basel
	Report	Frei 18'

Coliseum Alfonso Pérez, Getafe
Attendance: 6,213
Referee: Jérôme Brisard (France)

7 November 2019
18:55 (20:55 UTC+3)

Krasnodar (Russia)	3–1	(Turkey) Trabzonspor
Asan 27' (o.g.); Fernandes 34'; Ignatyev 90+3'	Report	Nwakaeme 90+4'

Krasnodar Stadium, Krasnodar
Attendance: 21,669
Referee: Benoît Bastien (France)
7 November 2019
18:55

Basel (Switzerland)	2–1	(Spain) Getafe
Arthur 8'; Frei 60'	Report	Mata 45' (pen.)

St. Jakob-Park, Basel
Attendance: 26,298
Referee: Serhiy Boyko (Ukraine)

28 November 2019
16:50 (18:50 UTC+3)

Trabzonspor (Turkey)	0–1	(Spain) Getafe
	Report	Mata 50'

Şenol Güneş Stadium, Trabzon
Attendance: 11,465
Referee: Andris Treimanis (Latvia)
28 November 2019
16:50 (18:50 UTC+3)

Krasnodar (Russia)	1–0	(Switzerland) Basel
Ari 72' (pen.)	Report

Krasnodar Stadium, Krasnodar
Attendance: 22,826
Referee: Bobby Madden (Scotland)

12 December 2019
18:55

Getafe (Spain)	3–0	(Russia) Krasnodar
Cabrera 76'; Molina 78'; Kenedy 86'	Report

Coliseum Alfonso Pérez, Getafe
Attendance: 9,389
Referee: Daniel Siebert (Germany)
12 December 2019
18:55

Basel (Switzerland)	2–0	(Turkey) Trabzonspor
Widmer 21'; Stocker 72'	Report

St. Jakob-Park, Basel
Attendance: 17,921
Referee: Aleksandar Stavrev (North Macedonia)

=== Group D ===
Pos	Team	Pld	W	D	L	GF	GA	GD	Pts	Qualification	LASK	SPO	PSV	ROS
1	(Austria) LASK	6	4	1	1	11	4	+7	13	Advance to knockout phase	—	3–0	4–1	1–0
2	(Portugal) Sporting CP	6	4	0	2	11	7	+4	12	Advance to knockout phase	2–1	—	4–0	1–0
3	(Netherlands) PSV Eindhoven	6	2	2	2	9	12	−3	8		0–0	3–2	—	1–1
4	(Norway) Rosenborg	6	0	1	5	3	11	−8	1		1–2	0–2	1–4	—

Source: UEFA
Rules for classification: Group stage tiebreakers
19 September 2019
18:55

PSV Eindhoven (Netherlands)	3–2	(Portugal) Sporting CP
Malen 19'; Coates 25' (o.g.); Baumgartl 48'	Report	Fernandes 38' (pen.); Mendes 82'

Philips Stadion, Eindhoven
Attendance: 30,000
Referee: Ivan Kružliak (Slovakia)
19 September 2019
18:55

LASK (Austria)	1–0	(Norway) Rosenborg
Holland 45+3'	Report

Linzer Stadion, Linz (Note: LASK played their home matches at Linzer Stadion, Linz, instead of their regular stadium Waldstadion, Pasching.)
Attendance: 12,179
Referee: Donatas Rumšas (Lithuania)

3 October 2019
21:00

Rosenborg (Norway)	1–4	(Netherlands) PSV Eindhoven
Adegbenro 70'	Report	Rosario 14'; Meling 38' (o.g.); Malen 41', 79'

Lerkendal Stadion, Trondheim
Attendance: 10,296
Referee: Halil Umut Meler (Turkey)
3 October 2019
21:00 (20:00 UTC+1)

Sporting CP (Portugal)	2–1	(Austria) LASK
Luiz Phellype 58'; Fernandes 63'	Report	Raguž 16'

Estádio José Alvalade, Lisbon
Attendance: 31,225
Referee: Alain Durieux (Luxembourg)

24 October 2019
21:00 (20:00 UTC+1)

Sporting CP (Portugal)	1–0	(Norway) Rosenborg
Bolasie 70'	Report

Estádio José Alvalade, Lisbon
Attendance: 27,671
Referee: Lawrence Visser (Belgium)
24 October 2019
21:00

PSV Eindhoven (Netherlands)	0–0	(Austria) LASK
	Report

Philips Stadion, Eindhoven
Attendance: 29,000
Referee: Chris Kavanagh (England)

7 November 2019
18:55

Rosenborg (Norway)	0–2	(Portugal) Sporting CP
	Report	Coates 16'; Fernandes 38'

Lerkendal Stadion, Trondheim
Attendance: 11,018
Referee: Kevin Clancy (Scotland)
7 November 2019
18:55

LASK (Austria)	4–1	(Netherlands) PSV Eindhoven
Ranftl 56'; Frieser 60'; Klauss 78', 82'	Report	Schwaab 5' (pen.)

Linzer Stadion, Linz
Attendance: 12,658
Referee: Radu Petrescu (Romania)

28 November 2019
21:00 (20:00 UTC+0)

Sporting CP (Portugal)	4–0	(Netherlands) PSV Eindhoven
Luiz Phellype 9'; Fernandes 16', 64' (pen.); Mathieu 43'	Report

Estádio José Alvalade, Lisbon
Attendance: 30,146
Referee: Orel Grinfeld (Israel)
28 November 2019
21:00

Rosenborg (Norway)	1–2	(Austria) LASK
Johnsen 45'	Report	Goiginger 20'; Frieser 54'

Lerkendal Stadion, Trondheim
Attendance: 9,775
Referee: Giorgi Kruashvili (Georgia)

12 December 2019
18:55

PSV Eindhoven (Netherlands)	1–1	(Norway) Rosenborg
Ihattaren 63'	Report	Helland 22'

Philips Stadion, Eindhoven
Attendance: 24,000
Referee: Vitali Meshkov (Russia)
12 December 2019
18:55

LASK (Austria)	3–0	(Portugal) Sporting CP
Trauner 23'; Klauss 38' (pen.); Raguž 90+3'	Report

Linzer Stadion, Linz
Attendance: 11,627
Referee: Willie Collum (Scotland)

=== Group E ===
Pos	Team	Pld	W	D	L	GF	GA	GD	Pts	Qualification	CEL	CLJ	LAZ	REN
1	(Scotland) Celtic	6	4	1	1	10	6	+4	13	Advance to knockout phase	—	2–0	2–1	3–1
2	(Romania) CFR Cluj	6	4	0	2	6	4	+2	12	Advance to knockout phase	2–0	—	2–1	1–0
3	(Italy) Lazio	6	2	0	4	6	9	−3	6		1–2	1–0	—	2–1
4	(France) Rennes	6	1	1	4	5	8	−3	4		1–1	0–1	2–0	—

Source: UEFA
Rules for classification: Group stage tiebreakers
19 September 2019
18:55

Rennes (France)	1–1	(Scotland) Celtic
Niang 38' (pen.)	Report	Christie 59' (pen.)

Roazhon Park, Rennes
Attendance: 27,026
Referee: José María Sánchez Martínez (Spain)
19 September 2019
18:55 (19:55 UTC+3)

CFR Cluj (Romania)	2–1	(Italy) Lazio
Deac 41' (pen.); Omrani 75'	Report	Bastos 25'

Stadionul Dr. Constantin Rădulescu, Cluj-Napoca
Attendance: 9,222
Referee: Daniel Stefański (Poland)

3 October 2019
21:00

Lazio (Italy)	2–1	(France) Rennes
Milinković-Savić 63'; Immobile 75'	Report	Morel 55'

Stadio Olimpico, Rome
Attendance: 13,072
Referee: Serhiy Boyko (Ukraine)
3 October 2019
21:00 (20:00 UTC+1)

Celtic (Scotland)	2–0	(Romania) CFR Cluj
Édouard 20'; Elyounoussi 59'	Report

Celtic Park, Glasgow
Attendance: 56,172
Referee: Daniel Siebert (Germany)

24 October 2019
21:00 (20:00 UTC+1)

Celtic (Scotland)	2–1	(Italy) Lazio
Christie 67'; Jullien 89'	Report	Lazzari 40'

Celtic Park, Glasgow
Attendance: 56,172
Referee: Ivan Bebek (Croatia)
24 October 2019
21:00

Rennes (France)	0–1	(Romania) CFR Cluj
	Report	Deac 9'

Roazhon Park, Rennes
Attendance: 27,330
Referee: Aleksei Eskov (Russia)

7 November 2019
18:55

Lazio (Italy)	1–2	(Scotland) Celtic
Immobile 7'	Report	Forrest 38'; Ntcham 90+5'

Stadio Olimpico, Rome
Attendance: 26,155
Referee: Tobias Stieler (Germany)
7 November 2019
18:55 (19:55 UTC+2)

CFR Cluj (Romania)	1–0	(France) Rennes
Rondón 87'	Report

Stadionul Dr. Constantin Rădulescu, Cluj-Napoca
Attendance: 11,067
Referee: Tiago Martins (Portugal)

28 November 2019
21:00 (20:00 UTC+0)

Celtic (Scotland)	3–1	(France) Rennes
Morgan 22'; Christie 45+1'; Johnston 74'	Report	Hunou 89'

Celtic Park, Glasgow
Attendance: 56,172
Referee: Espen Eskås (Norway)
28 November 2019
21:00

Lazio (Italy)	1–0	(Romania) CFR Cluj
Correa 24'	Report

Stadio Olimpico, Rome
Attendance: 7,604
Referee: Ali Palabıyık (Turkey)

12 December 2019
18:55

Rennes (France)	2–0	(Italy) Lazio
Gnagnon 31', 87'	Report

Roazhon Park, Rennes
Attendance: 25,082
Referee: Srđan Jovanović (Serbia)
12 December 2019
18:55 (19:55 UTC+2)

CFR Cluj (Romania)	2–0	(Scotland) Celtic
Burcă 49'; Djoković 70'	Report

Stadionul Dr. Constantin Rădulescu, Cluj-Napoca
Attendance: 12,890
Referee: Halis Özkahya (Turkey)

=== Group F ===
Pos	Team	Pld	W	D	L	GF	GA	GD	Pts	Qualification	ARS	FRA	STL	VSC
1	(England) Arsenal	6	3	2	1	14	7	+7	11	Advance to knockout phase	—	1–2	4–0	3–2
2	(Germany) Eintracht Frankfurt	6	3	0	3	8	10	−2	9	Advance to knockout phase	0–3	—	2–1	2–3
3	(Belgium) Standard Liège	6	2	2	2	8	10	−2	8		2–2	2–1	—	2–0
4	(Portugal) Vitória de Guimarães	6	1	2	3	7	10	−3	5		1–1	0–1	1–1	—

Source: UEFA
Rules for classification: Group stage tiebreakers
19 September 2019
18:55

Eintracht Frankfurt (Germany)	0–3	(England) Arsenal
	Report	Willock 38'; Saka 85'; Aubameyang 88'

Waldstadion, Frankfurt
Attendance: 47,000
Referee: Davide Massa (Italy)
19 September 2019
18:55

Standard Liège (Belgium)	2–0	(Portugal) Vitória de Guimarães
Hanin 66' (o.g.); M'Poku 90+1'	Report

Stade Maurice Dufrasne, Liège
Attendance: 13,477
Referee: Sergey Ivanov (Russia)

3 October 2019 (Note: Vitória de Guimarães' home matches were initially scheduled on Wednesdays at 16:50 (15:50 UTC+1/UTC+0), pending confirmation, due to security concerns related to scheduling conflicts with Braga's home matches. On 4 September 2019, the Vitória de Guimarães v Eintracht Frankfurt match was rescheduled to 3 October 2019, 21:00 (20:00 UTC+1), after a "risk reassessment by the security forces". On 11 September 2019, the Vitória de Guimarães v Arsenal match was refused rescheduling to 7 November 2019, 18:55 (17:55 UTC+0), in order to avoid a scheduling conflict with the Braga v Beşiktaş match. On 5 October 2019, the Vitória de Guimarães v Standard Liège match was moved to 28 November 2019, 21:00 (20:00 UTC+0).)
21:00 (20:00 UTC+1)

Vitória de Guimarães (Portugal)	0–1	(Germany) Eintracht Frankfurt
	Report	Ndicka 36'

Estádio D. Afonso Henriques, Guimarães
Attendance: 15,187
Referee: Radu Petrescu (Romania)
3 October 2019
21:00 (20:00 UTC+1)

Arsenal (England)	4–0	(Belgium) Standard Liège
Martinelli 13', 16'; Willock 22'; Ceballos 57'	Report

Emirates Stadium, London
Attendance: 58,725
Referee: Sandro Schärer (Switzerland)

24 October 2019
21:00 (20:00 UTC+1)

Arsenal (England)	3–2	(Portugal) Vitória de Guimarães
Martinelli 32'; Pépé 80', 90+3'	Report	Edwards 9'; Bruno 37'

Emirates Stadium, London
Attendance: 60,195
Referee: Serdar Gözübüyük (Netherlands)
24 October 2019
21:00

Eintracht Frankfurt (Germany)	2–1	(Belgium) Standard Liège
Abraham 28'; Hinteregger 73'	Report	Amallah 82'

Waldstadion, Frankfurt
Attendance: 47,000
Referee: Daniel Stefański (Poland)

6 November 2019
16:50 (15:50 UTC+0)

Vitória de Guimarães (Portugal)	1–1	(England) Arsenal
Bruno 90+1'	Report	Mustafi 81'

Estádio D. Afonso Henriques, Guimarães
Attendance: 17,822
Referee: Halis Özkahya (Turkey)
7 November 2019
18:55

Standard Liège (Belgium)	2–1	(Germany) Eintracht Frankfurt
Vanheusden 56'; Lestienne 90+4'	Report	Kostić 65'

Stade Maurice Dufrasne, Liège
Attendance: 15,952
Referee: Matej Jug (Slovenia)

28 November 2019
21:00 (20:00 UTC+0)

Vitória de Guimarães (Portugal)	1–1	(Belgium) Standard Liège
Pereira 45+2'	Report	Lestienne 40' (pen.)

Estádio D. Afonso Henriques, Guimarães
Attendance: 11,221
Referee: Serhiy Boyko (Ukraine)
28 November 2019
21:00 (20:00 UTC+0)

Arsenal (England)	1–2	(Germany) Eintracht Frankfurt
Aubameyang 45+1'	Report	Kamada 55', 64'

Emirates Stadium, London
Attendance: 49,419
Referee: Ruddy Buquet (France)

12 December 2019
18:55

Eintracht Frankfurt (Germany)	2–3	(Portugal) Vitória de Guimarães
Da Costa 31'; Kamada 38'	Report	Rochinha 8'; Al-Musrati 85'; Edwards 87'

Waldstadion, Frankfurt
Attendance: 47,000
Referee: Gediminas Mažeika (Lithuania)
12 December 2019
18:55

Standard Liège (Belgium)	2–2	(England) Arsenal
Bastien 47'; Amallah 69'	Report	Lacazette 78'; Saka 81'

Stade Maurice Dufrasne, Liège
Attendance: 21,797
Referee: Andreas Ekberg (Sweden)

=== Group G ===
Pos	Team	Pld	W	D	L	GF	GA	GD	Pts	Qualification	POR	RAN	YB	FEY
1	(Portugal) Porto	6	3	1	2	8	9	−1	10	Advance to knockout phase	—	1–1	2–1	3–2
2	(Scotland) Rangers	6	2	3	1	8	6	+2	9	Advance to knockout phase	2–0	—	1–1	1–0
3	(Switzerland) Young Boys	6	2	2	2	8	7	+1	8		1–2	2–1	—	2–0
4	(Netherlands) Feyenoord	6	1	2	3	7	9	−2	5		2–0	2–2	1–1	—

Source: UEFA
Rules for classification: Group stage tiebreakers
19 September 2019
21:00 (20:00 UTC+1)

Porto (Portugal)	2–1	(Switzerland) Young Boys
Soares 8', 29'	Report	Nsame 15' (pen.)

Estádio do Dragão, Porto
Attendance: 32,929
Referee: Andris Treimanis (Latvia)
19 September 2019
21:00 (20:00 UTC+1)

Rangers (Scotland)	1–0	(Netherlands) Feyenoord
Ojo 24'	Report

Ibrox Stadium, Glasgow
Attendance: 46,858
Referee: Antonio Mateu Lahoz (Spain)

3 October 2019
18:55

Feyenoord (Netherlands)	2–0	(Portugal) Porto
Toornstra 49'; Karsdorp 80'	Report

De Kuip, Rotterdam
Attendance: 41,000
Referee: Sergei Karasev (Russia)
3 October 2019
18:55

Young Boys (Switzerland)	2–1	(Scotland) Rangers
Assalé 50'; Fassnacht 90+3'	Report	Morelos 44'

Stade de Suisse, Bern
Attendance: 26,348
Referee: Manuel Schüttengruber (Austria)

24 October 2019
18:55

Young Boys (Switzerland)	2–0	(Netherlands) Feyenoord
Assalé 14' (pen.); Nsame 28' (pen.)	Report

Stade de Suisse, Bern
Attendance: 27,641
Referee: Jakob Kehlet (Denmark)
24 October 2019
18:55 (17:55 UTC+1)

Porto (Portugal)	1–1	(Scotland) Rangers
Díaz 36'	Report	Morelos 44'

Estádio do Dragão, Porto
Attendance: 31,307
Referee: Nikola Dabanović (Montenegro)

7 November 2019
21:00

Feyenoord (Netherlands)	1–1	(Switzerland) Young Boys
Berghuis 18' (pen.)	Report	Spielmann 71'

De Kuip, Rotterdam
Attendance: 45,022
Referee: Paweł Gil (Poland)
7 November 2019
21:00 (20:00 UTC+0)

Rangers (Scotland)	2–0	(Portugal) Porto
Morelos 69'; Davis 73'	Report

Ibrox Stadium, Glasgow
Attendance: 49,645
Referee: Davide Massa (Italy)

28 November 2019
18:55

Young Boys (Switzerland)	1–2	(Portugal) Porto
Fassnacht 6'	Report	Aboubakar 76', 79'

Stade de Suisse, Bern
Attendance: 31,120
Referee: Tamás Bognár (Hungary)
28 November 2019
18:55

Feyenoord (Netherlands)	2–2	(Scotland) Rangers
Toornstra 33'; Sinisterra 68'	Report	Morelos 53', 65'

De Kuip, Rotterdam
Attendance: 47,500
Referee: Damir Skomina (Slovenia)

12 December 2019
21:00 (20:00 UTC+0)

Porto (Portugal)	3–2	(Netherlands) Feyenoord
Díaz 14'; Malacia 16' (o.g.); Soares 34'	Report	Botteghin 19'; Larsson 22'

Estádio do Dragão, Porto
Attendance: 28,507
Referee: Deniz Aytekin (Germany)
12 December 2019
21:00 (20:00 UTC+0)

Rangers (Scotland)	1–1	(Switzerland) Young Boys
Morelos 30'	Report	Barišić 89' (o.g.)

Ibrox Stadium, Glasgow
Attendance: 49,015
Referee: Felix Brych (Germany)

=== Group H ===
Pos	Team	Pld	W	D	L	GF	GA	GD	Pts	Qualification	ESP	LUD	FER	CSKA
1	(Spain) Espanyol	6	3	2	1	12	4	+8	11	Advance to knockout phase	—	6–0	1–1	0–1
2	(Bulgaria) Ludogorets Razgrad	6	2	2	2	10	10	0	8	Advance to knockout phase	0–1	—	1–1	5–1
3	(Hungary) Ferencváros	6	1	4	1	5	7	−2	7		2–2	0–3	—	0–0
4	(Russia) CSKA Moscow	6	1	2	3	3	9	−6	5		0–2	1–1	0–1	—

Source: UEFA
Rules for classification: Group stage tiebreakers
19 September 2019
21:00 (22:00 UTC+3)

Ludogorets Razgrad (Bulgaria)	5–1	(Russia) CSKA Moscow
Wanderson 48'; Lukoki 50'; Keșerü 52', 68', 73' (pen.)	Report	Diveyev 11'

Ludogorets Arena, Razgrad
Attendance: 8,423
Referee: Irfan Peljto (Bosnia and Herzegovina)
19 September 2019
21:00

Espanyol (Spain)	1–1	(Hungary) Ferencváros
Vargas 60'	Report	J. López 10' (o.g.)

RCDE Stadium, Cornellà de Llobregat
Attendance: 18,125
Referee: Nikola Dabanović (Montenegro)

3 October 2019
18:55

Ferencváros (Hungary)	0–3	(Bulgaria) Ludogorets Razgrad
	Report	Lukoki 1'; Rafael Forster 40', 64'

Groupama Arena, Budapest
Attendance: 16,163
Referee: Bartosz Frankowski (Poland)
3 October 2019
18:55 (19:55 UTC+3)

CSKA Moscow (Russia)	0–2	(Spain) Espanyol
	Report	Wu Lei 64'; Campuzano 90+5'

VEB Arena, Moscow
Attendance: 22,288
Referee: Ali Palabıyık (Turkey)

24 October 2019
18:55 (19:55 UTC+3)

CSKA Moscow (Russia)	0–1	(Hungary) Ferencváros
	Report	R. Varga 86'

VEB Arena, Moscow
Attendance: 18,518
Referee: Pavel Orel (Czech Republic)
24 October 2019
18:55 (19:55 UTC+3)

Ludogorets Razgrad (Bulgaria)	0–1	(Spain) Espanyol
	Report	Campuzano 13'

Ludogorets Arena, Razgrad
Attendance: 10,334
Referee: Aliyar Aghayev (Azerbaijan)

7 November 2019
21:00

Ferencváros (Hungary)	0–0	(Russia) CSKA Moscow
	Report

Groupama Arena, Budapest
Attendance: 18,153
Referee: Aleksandar Stavrev (North Macedonia)
7 November 2019
21:00

Espanyol (Spain)	6–0	(Bulgaria) Ludogorets Razgrad
Melendo 4'; L. López 19'; Vargas 36' (pen.); Campuzano 52'; Pedrosa 73'; Ferreyra 76'	Report

RCDE Stadium, Cornellà de Llobregat
Attendance: 13,963
Referee: François Letexier (France)

28 November 2019
18:55 (20:55 UTC+3)

CSKA Moscow (Russia)	1–1	(Bulgaria) Ludogorets Razgrad
Chalov 76'	Report	Keșerü 66'

VEB Arena, Moscow
Attendance: 12,948
Referee: Jakob Kehlet (Denmark)
28 November 2019
18:55

Ferencváros (Hungary)	2–2	(Spain) Espanyol
Sigér 23'; Škvarka 90+1' (pen.)	Report	Melendo 31'; Darder 90+6'

Groupama Arena, Budapest
Attendance: 19,111
Referee: Tiago Martins (Portugal)

12 December 2019
21:00 (22:00 UTC+2)

Ludogorets Razgrad (Bulgaria)	1–1	(Hungary) Ferencváros
Lukoki 24'	Report	Signevich 90+5'

Ludogorets Arena, Razgrad
Attendance: 5,528
Referee: Matej Jug (Slovenia)
12 December 2019
21:00

Espanyol (Spain)	0–1	(Russia) CSKA Moscow
	Report	Vlašić 84'

RCDE Stadium, Cornellà de Llobregat
Attendance: 10,615
Referee: Kevin Blom (Netherlands)

=== Group I ===
Pos	Team	Pld	W	D	L	GF	GA	GD	Pts	Qualification	GNT	WLF	STE	OLE
1	(Belgium) Gent	6	3	3	0	11	7	+4	12	Advance to knockout phase	—	2–2	3–2	2–1
2	(Germany) VfL Wolfsburg	6	3	2	1	9	7	+2	11	Advance to knockout phase	1–3	—	1–0	3–1
3	(France) Saint-Étienne	6	0	4	2	6	8	−2	4		0–0	1–1	—	1–1
4	(Ukraine) Oleksandriya	6	0	3	3	6	10	−4	3		1–1	0–1	2–2	—

Source: UEFA
Rules for classification: Group stage tiebreakers
19 September 2019
21:00

Gent (Belgium)	3–2	(France) Saint-Étienne
David 2', 43'; Perrin 64' (o.g.)	Report	Khazri 38'; Kaminski 75' (o.g.)

Ghelamco Arena, Ghent
Attendance: 14,928
Referee: Roi Reinshreiber (Israel)
19 September 2019
21:00

VfL Wolfsburg (Germany)	3–1	(Ukraine) Oleksandriya
Arnold 20'; Mehmedi 24'; Brekalo 67'	Report	Banada 66'

Volkswagen Arena, Wolfsburg
Attendance: 10,112
Referee: Halis Özkahya (Turkey)

3 October 2019
18:55 (19:55 UTC+3)

Oleksandriya (Ukraine)	1–1	(Belgium) Gent
Sitalo 60'	Report	Depoitre 6'

Arena Lviv, Lviv (Note: Oleksandriya played their home matches at Arena Lviv, Lviv, instead of their regular stadium CSC Nika Stadium, Oleksandriia, which did not meet UEFA requirements.)
Attendance: 7,588
Referee: Jens Maae (Denmark)
3 October 2019
18:55

Saint-Étienne (France)	1–1	(Germany) VfL Wolfsburg
Kolodziejczak 13'	Report	William 15'

Stade Geoffroy-Guichard, Saint-Étienne
Attendance: 24,815
Referee: Craig Pawson (England)

24 October 2019
18:55

Saint-Étienne (France)	1–1	(Ukraine) Oleksandriya
Gabriel Silva 8'	Report	Gabriel Silva 14' (o.g.)

Stade Geoffroy-Guichard, Saint-Étienne
Attendance: 28,573
Referee: Espen Eskås (Norway)
24 October 2019
18:55

Gent (Belgium)	2–2	(Germany) VfL Wolfsburg
Yaremchuk 41', 90+4'	Report	Weghorst 3'; João Victor 24'

Ghelamco Arena, Ghent
Attendance: 15,437
Referee: Sergey Ivanov (Russia)

7 November 2019
21:00 (22:00 UTC+2)

Oleksandriya (Ukraine)	2–2	(France) Saint-Étienne
Bezborodko 84'; Zaderaka 90+1'	Report	Khazri 24' (pen.); Camara 72'

Arena Lviv, Lviv
Attendance: 6,361
Referee: João Pinheiro (Portugal)
7 November 2019
21:00

VfL Wolfsburg (Germany)	1–3	(Belgium) Gent
João Victor 20'	Report	Yaremchuk 50'; Depoitre 65'; Ngadeu-Ngadjui 76'

Volkswagen Arena, Wolfsburg
Attendance: 11,620
Referee: Massimiliano Irrati (Italy)

28 November 2019
18:55

Saint-Étienne (France)	0–0	(Belgium) Gent
	Report

Stade Geoffroy-Guichard, Saint-Étienne
Attendance: 25,315
Referee: Irfan Peljto (Bosnia and Herzegovina)
28 November 2019
18:55 (19:55 UTC+2)

Oleksandriya (Ukraine)	0–1	(Germany) VfL Wolfsburg
	Report	Weghorst 45+1' (pen.)

Arena Lviv, Lviv
Attendance: 7,118
Referee: Manuel Schüttengruber (Austria)

12 December 2019
21:00

Gent (Belgium)	2–1	(Ukraine) Oleksandriya
Depoitre 7', 16'	Report	Miroshnichenko 54'

Ghelamco Arena, Ghent
Attendance: 13,156
Referee: Radu Petrescu (Romania)
12 December 2019
21:00

VfL Wolfsburg (Germany)	1–0	(France) Saint-Étienne
Otávio 52'	Report

Volkswagen Arena, Wolfsburg
Attendance: 10,802
Referee: Paul Tierney (England)

=== Group J ===
Pos	Team	Pld	W	D	L	GF	GA	GD	Pts	Qualification	IBS	ROM	MGB	WLB
1	(Turkey) İstanbul Başakşehir	6	3	1	2	7	9	−2	10	Advance to knockout phase	—	0–3	1–1	1–0
2	(Italy) Roma	6	2	3	1	12	6	+6	9	Advance to knockout phase	4–0	—	1–1	2–2
3	(Germany) Borussia Mönchengladbach	6	2	2	2	6	9	−3	8		1–2	2–1	—	0–4
4	(Austria) Wolfsberger AC	6	1	2	3	7	8	−1	5		0–3	1–1	0–1	—

Source: UEFA
Rules for classification: Group stage tiebreakers
19 September 2019
21:00

Roma (Italy)	4–0	(Turkey) İstanbul Başakşehir
Júnior Caiçara 42' (o.g.); Džeko 58'; Zaniolo 71'; Kluivert 90+3'	Report

Stadio Olimpico, Rome
Attendance: 21,348
Referee: Xavier Estrada Fernández (Spain)
19 September 2019
21:00

Borussia Mönchengladbach (Germany)	0–4	(Austria) Wolfsberger AC
	Report	Weismann 13'; Leitgeb 31', 68'; Ritzmaier 41'

Borussia-Park, Mönchengladbach
Attendance: 34,846
Referee: Tamás Bognár (Hungary)

3 October 2019
18:55

Wolfsberger AC (Austria)	1–1	(Italy) Roma
Liendl 51'	Report	Spinazzola 27'

Liebenauer Stadium, Graz (Note: Wolfsberger AC played their home matches at Liebenauer Stadium, Graz, instead of their regular stadium Lavanttal-Arena, Wolfsberg.)
Attendance: 11,169
Referee: Tiago Martins (Portugal)
3 October 2019
18:55 (19:55 UTC+3)

İstanbul Başakşehir (Turkey)	1–1	(Germany) Borussia Mönchengladbach
Višća 55'	Report	Herrmann 90+1'

Başakşehir Fatih Terim Stadium, Istanbul
Attendance: 5,646
Referee: Stuart Attwell (England)

24 October 2019
18:55 (19:55 UTC+3)

İstanbul Başakşehir (Turkey)	1–0	(Austria) Wolfsberger AC
Kahveci 78'	Report

Başakşehir Fatih Terim Stadium, Istanbul
Attendance: 4,101
Referee: Irfan Peljto (Bosnia and Herzegovina)
24 October 2019
18:55

Roma (Italy)	1–1	(Germany) Borussia Mönchengladbach
Zaniolo 32'	Report	Stindl 90+5' (pen.)

Stadio Olimpico, Rome
Attendance: 29,037
Referee: Willie Collum (Scotland)

7 November 2019
21:00

Wolfsberger AC (Austria)	0–3	(Turkey) İstanbul Başakşehir
	Report	Višća 73' (pen.); Crivelli 84', 87'

Liebenauer Stadium, Graz
Attendance: 5,286
Referee: Sandro Schärer (Switzerland)
7 November 2019
21:00

Borussia Mönchengladbach (Germany)	2–1	(Italy) Roma
Fazio 35' (o.g.); Thuram 90+5'	Report	Fazio 64'

Borussia-Park, Mönchengladbach
Attendance: 44,570
Referee: Jesús Gil Manzano (Spain)

28 November 2019
18:55 (20:55 UTC+3)

İstanbul Başakşehir (Turkey)	0–3	(Italy) Roma
	Report	Veretout 30' (pen.); Kluivert 41'; Džeko 45+1'

Başakşehir Fatih Terim Stadium, Istanbul
Attendance: 12,879
Referee: Ovidiu Hațegan (Romania)
28 November 2019
18:55

Wolfsberger AC (Austria)	0–1	(Germany) Borussia Mönchengladbach
	Report	Stindl 60'

Liebenauer Stadium, Graz
Attendance: 12,073
Referee: Serdar Gözübüyük (Netherlands)

12 December 2019
21:00

Roma (Italy)	2–2	(Austria) Wolfsberger AC
Perotti 7' (pen.); Džeko 19'	Report	Florenzi 10' (o.g.); Weissman 64'

Stadio Olimpico, Rome
Attendance: 21,672
Referee: Craig Pawson (England)
12 December 2019
21:00

Borussia Mönchengladbach (Germany)	1–2	(Turkey) İstanbul Başakşehir
Thuram 33'	Report	Kahveci 44'; Crivelli 90+1'

Borussia-Park, Mönchengladbach
Attendance: 40,046
Referee: José María Sánchez Martínez (Spain)

=== Group K ===
Pos	Team	Pld	W	D	L	GF	GA	GD	Pts	Qualification	BRA	WOL	SLO	BES
1	(Portugal) Braga	6	4	2	0	15	9	+6	14	Advance to knockout phase	—	3–3	2–2	3–1
2	(England) Wolverhampton Wanderers	6	4	1	1	11	5	+6	13	Advance to knockout phase	0–1	—	1–0	4–0
3	(Slovakia) Slovan Bratislava	6	1	1	4	10	13	−3	4		2–4	1–2	—	4–2
4	(Turkey) Beşiktaş	6	1	0	5	6	15	−9	3		1–2	0–1	2–1	—

Source: UEFA
Rules for classification: Group stage tiebreakers
19 September 2019
21:00

Slovan Bratislava (Slovakia)	4–2	(Turkey) Beşiktaş
Šporar 14', 58'; Ljubičić 90+3'; Moha 90+4'	Report	Ljajić 29' (pen.); Bozhikov 45+1' (o.g.)

Tehelné pole, Bratislava
Attendance: 5,273 (Note: The match was supposed to play behind closed doors due to UEFA punishment, but Slovan Bratislava used the UEFA regulation, which allows children under 14 years old to visit.)
Referee: Kristo Tohver (Estonia)
19 September 2019
21:00 (20:00 UTC+1)

Wolverhampton Wanderers (England)	0–1	(Portugal) Braga
	Report	R. Horta 71'

Molineux Stadium, Wolverhampton
Attendance: 28,314
Referee: Jakob Kehlet (Denmark)

3 October 2019
18:55 (17:55 UTC+1)

Braga (Portugal)	2–2	(Slovakia) Slovan Bratislava
Viana 31'; Galeno 63'	Report	Šporar 45+4'; Viana 87' (o.g.)

Estádio Municipal, Braga
Attendance: 9,077
Referee: Adrien Jaccottet (Switzerland)
3 October 2019
18:55 (19:55 UTC+3)

Beşiktaş (Turkey)	0–1	(England) Wolverhampton Wanderers
	Report	Boly 90+3'

Vodafone Park, Istanbul
Attendance: 22,670
Referee: Harald Lechner (Austria)

24 October 2019
18:55 (19:55 UTC+3)

Beşiktaş (Turkey)	1–2	(Portugal) Braga
Nayir 71'	Report	R. Horta 38'; Eduardo 80'

Vodafone Park, Istanbul
Attendance: 20,956
Referee: Alejandro Hernández Hernández (Spain)
24 October 2019
18:55

Slovan Bratislava (Slovakia)	1–2	(England) Wolverhampton Wanderers
Šporar 11'	Report	Saïss 58'; Jiménez 64' (pen.)

Tehelné pole, Bratislava
Attendance: 20,333
Referee: Yevhen Aranovskyi (Ukraine)

7 November 2019
21:00 (20:00 UTC+0)

Braga (Portugal)	3–1	(Turkey) Beşiktaş
Paulinho 14', 37'; Eduardo 81'	Report	Boyd 29'

Estádio Municipal, Braga
Attendance: 8,833
Referee: Gediminas Mažeika (Lithuania)
7 November 2019
21:00 (20:00 UTC+0)

Wolverhampton Wanderers (England)	1–0	(Slovakia) Slovan Bratislava
Jiménez 90+2'	Report

Molineux Stadium, Wolverhampton
Attendance: 29,789
Referee: Bas Nijhuis (Netherlands)

28 November 2019
18:55 (20:55 UTC+3)

Beşiktaş (Turkey)	2–1	(Slovakia) Slovan Bratislava
Roco 75'; Ljajić 90+2' (pen.)	Report	Daniel 35'

Vodafone Park, Istanbul
Attendance: 11,526
Referee: Enea Jorgji (Albania)
28 November 2019
18:55 (17:55 UTC+0)

Braga (Portugal)	3–3	(England) Wolverhampton Wanderers
A. Horta 6'; Paulinho 65'; Fransérgio 79'	Report	Jiménez 14'; Doherty 34'; Traoré 35'

Estádio Municipal, Braga
Attendance: 12,058
Referee: Aleksei Kulbakov (Belarus)

12 December 2019
21:00

Slovan Bratislava (Slovakia)	2–4	(Portugal) Braga
Šporar 42'; Moha 70'	Report	Fonte 44'; Trincão 72'; Bozhikov 75' (o.g.); Paulinho 90+3'

Tehelné pole, Bratislava
Attendance: 10,856
Referee: Paweł Gil (Poland)
12 December 2019
21:00 (20:00 UTC+0)

Wolverhampton Wanderers (England)	4–0	(Turkey) Beşiktaş
Jota 58', 63', 69'; Dendoncker 67'	Report

Molineux Stadium, Wolverhampton
Attendance: 27,866
Referee: Andris Treimanis (Latvia)

=== Group L ===
Pos	Team	Pld	W	D	L	GF	GA	GD	Pts	Qualification	MUN	AZ	PAR	AST
1	(England) Manchester United	6	4	1	1	10	2	+8	13	Advance to knockout phase	—	4–0	3–0	1–0
2	(Netherlands) AZ	6	2	3	1	15	8	+7	9	Advance to knockout phase	0–0	—	2–2	6–0
3	(Serbia) Partizan	6	2	2	2	10	10	0	8		0–1	2–2	—	4–1
4	(Kazakhstan) Astana	6	1	0	5	4	19	−15	3		2–1	0–5	1–2	—

Source: UEFA
Rules for classification: Group stage tiebreakers
19 September 2019
21:00

Partizan (Serbia)	2–2	(Netherlands) AZ
Natcho 42' (pen.), 61'	Report	Stengs 13'; Boadu 67'

Partizan Stadium, Belgrade
Attendance: 22,564 (Note: Partizan was supposed to play two matches behind closed doors, for the racist behaviour of its supporters against Yeni Malatyaspor at the third qualifying round. However, new regulations allowed little fans in their match against AZ. Apparently the sanction was not imposed either in the match against Manchester United.)
Referee: Marco Guida (Italy)
19 September 2019
21:00 (20:00 UTC+1)

Manchester United (England)	1–0	(Kazakhstan) Astana
Greenwood 73'	Report

Old Trafford, Manchester
Attendance: 50,783
Referee: François Letexier (France)

3 October 2019
16:50 (20:50 UTC+6)

Astana (Kazakhstan)	1–2	(Serbia) Partizan
Sigurjónsson 85'	Report	Sadiq 29', 73'

Astana Arena, Nur-Sultan
Attendance: 20,137
Referee: Mohammed Al-Hakim (Sweden)
3 October 2019
18:55

AZ (Netherlands)	0–0	(England) Manchester United
	Report

Cars Jeans Stadion, The Hague (Note: AZ played their home matches at Cars Jeans Stadion, The Hague, instead of their regular stadium AFAS Stadion, Alkmaar due to its roof collapse.)
Attendance: 13,863
Referee: Gediminas Mažeika (Lithuania)

24 October 2019
18:55

AZ (Netherlands)	6–0	(Kazakhstan) Astana
Koopmeiners 39' (pen.), 83' (pen.); Boadu 43'; Stengs 77'; Sugawara 85'; Idrissi 90+2'	Report

Cars Jeans Stadion, The Hague
Attendance: 8,123
Referee: Enea Jorgji (Albania)
24 October 2019
18:55

Partizan (Serbia)	0–1	(England) Manchester United
	Report	Martial 43' (pen.)

Partizan Stadium, Belgrade
Attendance: 25,627
Referee: Xavier Estrada Fernández (Spain)

7 November 2019
16:50 (21:50 UTC+6)

Astana (Kazakhstan)	0–5	(Netherlands) AZ
	Report	Boadu 29', 77'; Midtsjø 52'; Idrissi 57'; Chatzidiakos 76'

Astana Arena, Nur-Sultan
Attendance: 11,584
Referee: Mads-Kristoffer Kristoffersen (Denmark)
7 November 2019
21:00 (20:00 UTC+0)

Manchester United (England)	3–0	(Serbia) Partizan
Greenwood 22'; Martial 33'; Rashford 49'	Report

Old Trafford, Manchester
Attendance: 62,955
Referee: Mattias Gestranius (Finland)

28 November 2019
16:50 (21:50 UTC+6)

Astana (Kazakhstan)	2–1	(England) Manchester United
Shomko 55'; Bernard 62' (o.g.)	Report	Lingard 10'

Astana Arena, Nur-Sultan
Attendance: 28,949
Referee: Donatas Rumšas (Lithuania)
28 November 2019
18:55

AZ (Netherlands)	2–2	(Serbia) Partizan
Druijf 88', 90+2'	Report	Asano 16'; Soumah 27'

Cars Jeans Stadion, The Hague
Attendance: 9,092
Referee: Daniel Stefański (Poland)

12 December 2019
21:00

Partizan (Serbia)	4–1	(Kazakhstan) Astana
Soumah 4'; Sadiq 22', 76'; Asano 26'	Report	Rotariu 79'

Partizan Stadium, Belgrade
Attendance: 8,075
Referee: Filip Glova (Slovakia)
12 December 2019
21:00 (20:00 UTC+0)

Manchester United (England)	4–0	(Netherlands) AZ
Young 53'; Greenwood 58', 64'; Mata 62' (pen.)	Report

Old Trafford, Manchester
Attendance: 65,773
Referee: Sandro Schärer (Switzerland)
