= 2021 Taça da Liga final =

- Event: 2020–21 Taça da Liga
Sporting CP	Braga
1	0
- Date: 23 January 2021
- Venue: Estádio Dr. Magalhães Pessoa, Leiria
- Man of the Match: Pedro Porro
- Referee: Tiago Martins
- Attendance: 0 (Note: The final was played behind closed doors due to the COVID-19 pandemic in Portugal.)

The 2021 Taça da Liga final was the final match of the 2020–21 Taça da Liga, the fourteenth season of the Taça da Liga. It was played on 23 January 2021 at Estádio Dr. Magalhães Pessoa.

The competition was contested exclusively by clubs competing in the two professional divisions of Portuguese football – the top-tier Primeira Liga and the second-tier Liga Portugal 2.

Braga were the holders and two-time winners, they played the decisive match for the 4th time and second consecutive season, having beaten Porto 1–0 in the previous season's final. Meanwhile, Sporting CP played their fifth final in the competition, having last appeared in the 2019 final when they defeated Porto on penalties for their second title. Sporting CP won the final 1–0 over Braga for their third title, as result, became the second team (after Benfica) in the competition's history to win three Taças da Liga.

== Background ==
Due to calendar limitations derived from the COVID-19 pandemic in Portugal, this season followed a transitory format where only eight teams enter the competition. The final was also held behind closed doors due to the effects of the pandemic in Portugal. The Estádio Dr. Magalhães Pessoa in Leiria was chosen as the competition's final-four venue until 2023.

== Route to the final ==
Note: In all results below, the score of the finalist is given first (H: home; A: away).

Sporting CP		Round	Braga	
Opponent	Result	2020–21 Taça da Liga	Opponent	Result
Mafra (H)	2–0	Quarter-finals	Estoril (H)	3–1
Porto (N)	2–0	Semi-finals	Benfica (N)	2–1

== Match ==
=== Details ===
23 January 2021
19:45 WET (UTC±00:00)

Sporting CP	1–0	Braga
Porro 41'	Report

Estádio Dr. Magalhães Pessoa, Leiria
Attendance: 0
Referee: Tiago Martins

Sporting	Braga

GK	1	(Spain) Antonio Adán
RB	52	(Portugal) Gonçalo Inácio	(substituted off) 89'
CB	4	(Uruguay) Sebastián Coates (c)
LB	3	(Morocco) Zouhair Feddal
RM	24	(Spain) Pedro Porro	(yellow card) 81'
CM	6	(Portugal) João Palhinha
CM	17	(Portugal) João Mário	(substituted off) 68'
LM	5	(Portugal) Nuno Mendes	(yellow card) 76'
RF	28	(Portugal) Pedro Gonçalves	(yellow card) 90+5'	(red card) 90+6'
CF	19	(Portugal) Tiago Tomás	(substituted off) 59'
LF	10	(Cape Verde) Jovane Cabral	(yellow card) 24'	(substituted off) 46'
Substitutes:
GK	81	(Portugal) Luís Maximiano
DF	13	(Portugal) Luís Neto	(substituted in) 89'	(yellow card) 90+6'
DF	26	(Colombia) Cristian Borja	(substituted in) 80'
DF	55	(Portugal) Antunes
CM	8	(Brazil) Matheus Nunes	(substituted in) 68'	(yellow card) 88'
CM	68	(Portugal) Daniel Bragança
FW	11	(Portugal) Nuno Santos	(substituted in) 46'
FW	20	(Ecuador) Gonzalo Plata
FW	9	(Slovenia) Andraž Šporar	(substituted in) 59'
Manager:
(Portugal) Ruben Amorim (red card) 33'

GK	1	(Brazil) Matheus
CB	3	(Brazil) Vítor Tormena
CB	16	(Portugal) David Carmo
CB	5	(Portugal) Nuno Sequeira	(yellow card) 33'
RM	47	(Portugal) Ricardo Esgaio
CM	8	(Libya) Ali Musrati	(yellow card) 90+4'
CM	88	(Portugal) André Castro	(substituted off) 62'
LM	90	(Brazil) Galeno
RF	21	(Portugal) Ricardo Horta
CF	9	(Spain) Abel Ruiz	(substituted off) 46'
LF	27	(Brazil) Fransérgio (c)	(substituted off) 73'
Substitutes:
GK	12	(Portugal) Tiago Sá
DF	34	(Brazil) Raul Silva
DF	36	(Brazil) Bruno Viana
MF	7	(Portugal) João Novais	(substituted in) 73'
MF	11	(Brazil) Lucas Piazon
MF	15	(Portugal) André Horta
MF	45	(Portugal) Iuri Medeiros	(substituted in) 62'
FW	20	(Portugal) Paulinho	(substituted in) 46'
FW	95	(Brazil) Guilherme Schettine	(substituted in) 81'
Manager:
(Portugal) Carlos Carvalhal (red card) 33'

Man of the match

- Pedro Porro (Sporting)

Assistant referees:
André Campos
Pedro Mota
Fourth official:
Hugo Miguel
Video assistant referee:
Ricardo Santos
Assistant video assistant referee:
Manuel Mota

Match rules

- 90 minutes.
- Penalty shoot-out if scores still level.
- Seven named substitutes.
- Maximum of three substitutions.

== See also ==
- 2020–21 S.C. Braga season
- 2020–21 Sporting CP season
- 2021 Taça de Portugal final
