= Gonçalo Inácio =

Portuguese footballer (born 2001)

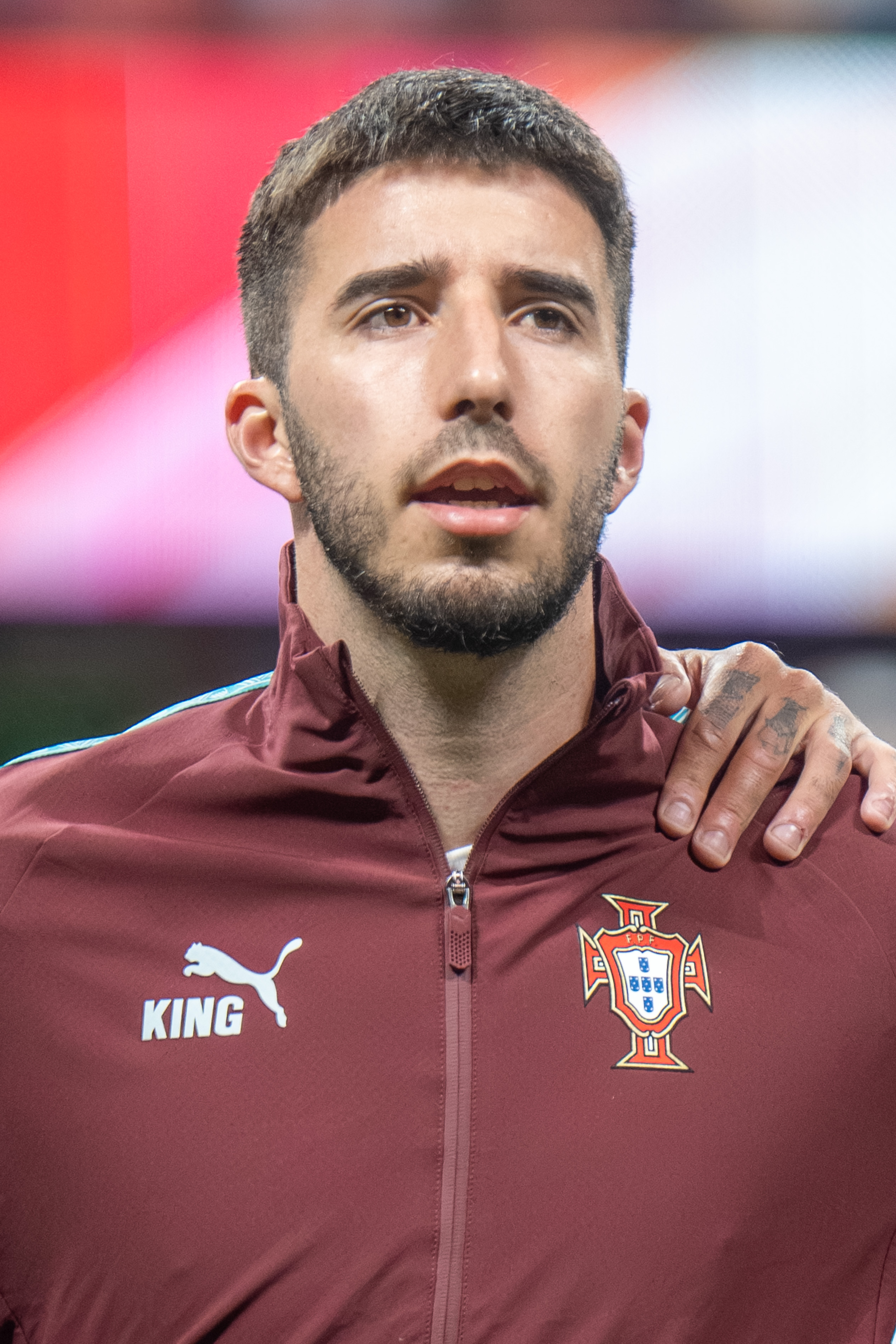
- Inácio with Portugal in 2026

Personal information
- Full name: Gonçalo Bernardo Inácio
- Date of birth: 25 August 2001 (age 25)
- Place of birth: Almada, Portugal
- Height: 1.85 m (6 ft 1 in)
- Position: Centre-back

Team information
- Current team: Sporting CP
- Number: 25

Youth career
- 2010–2012: Almada
- 2012–2020: Sporting CP

Senior career*
Years	Team	Apps	(Gls)
2020–	Sporting CP	180	(13)

International career^{‡}
2017	Portugal U17	1	(0)
2019	Portugal U18	8	(0)
2019	Portugal U19	3	(0)
2019	Portugal U20	1	(0)
2021–2022	Portugal U21	6	(1)
2023–	Portugal	22	(2)
Medal record
Men's football
Representing Portugal
UEFA Nations League
Winner	2025 Germany
- * Club domestic league appearances and goals as of 00:55, 8 November 2026 (UTC) ‡ National team caps and goals as of 21:45, 10 June 2026 (UTC)

Gonçalo Bernardo Inácio (Portuguese pronunciation: [ɡõˈsalu iˈnasju]; born 25 August 2001) is a Portuguese professional footballer who plays as a centre-back for Primeira Liga club Sporting CP, which he captains, and the Portugal national team.

Coming through Sporting CP's youth academy, he made his first-team debut in 2020. He went on to win three Primeira Liga titles with the club in the 2020–21, 2023–24 and 2024–25 seasons (being named to the 2024 and 2025 Teams of the Year), as well as back-to-back Taças da Liga in 2021 and 2022.

Having also been a Portugal youth international, Inácio made his full debut in 2023, being part of the squad at Euro 2024 and the 2026 World Cup. He won the 2024–25 UEFA Nations League.

== Early life ==
Inácio was born in Almada, Setúbal District and raised in Seixal, a municipality located 34.2 km (21.3 mi) away. Growing up, he would play football wherever he could on the streets or in his house, and regularly attended Sporting CP matches with his father.

Despite not having a particular idol, Inácio looked to emulate Jérémy Mathieu.

== Club career ==
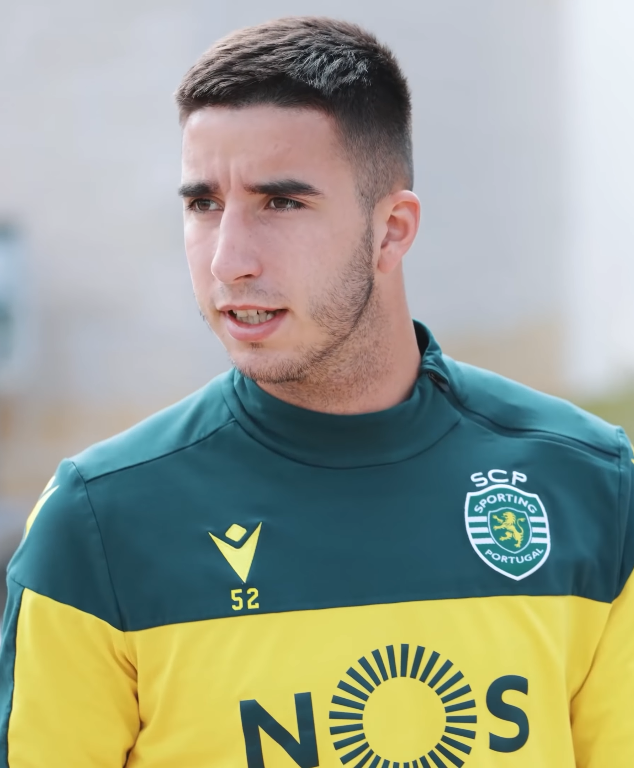
Inácio with Sporting CP in 2021

Inácio began his career at local Almada, before moving to Sporting's academy. Prior to this, he had several trials with crosstown rivals Benfica, but ultimately decided not to join them when his father's car broke down on two occasions when he was being taken to training. On 13 January 2018, he signed his first professional contract at the age of 16.

Inácio had his first call-up to the first team on 6 July 2020, remaining unused in a goalless draw at Moreirense in the Primeira Liga; he would initially struggle to be integrated, due to being reserved by nature, but managed to succeed with the help of manager Ruben Amorim and his teammates Nuno Mendes, Eduardo Quaresma and Tiago Tomás, whom he had befriended during his time in the youth sides. He made his debut in a 2–0 away win against Portimonense on 4 October, as a 62nd-minute substitute for Zouhair Feddal.

On 20 March 2021, Inácio scored his first goal, heading home from close range in the 1–0 home victory over Vitória de Guimarães. On 23 January, he provided the assist for Pedro Porro in a 1–0 defeat of Braga to help his club win the Taça da Liga; his performance in the match impressed Amorim, with the player eventually surpassing Luís Neto in the pecking order. He played 20 times in the domestic league for the eventual champions, ending a 19-year drought.

Inácio was named defender of the month for December 2021. The following 29 January, his second-half header helped his team come from behind to defeat Benfica 2–1 in the league cup final. On 1 April, he agreed to an extension until 2026.

On 12 November 2023, in the Lisbon derby against Benfica at the Estádio da Luz, Inácio was sent off after receiving a second yellow card at the start of the second half; Sporting went on to lose 2–1. On 14 December, in their final UEFA Europa League group game, at home to Sturm Graz, he came off the bench at half-time and scored twice in ten minutes to seal a 3–0 victory. During the season, he contributed 32 appearances and nearly 2,500 minutes as the club own its 20th league, being consequently included in the Team of the Year.

Inácio made his 200th competitive appearance on 23 February 2025, in a 2–2 away draw against AVS. He totalled six goals for the campaign (three in the league), again claiming the national championship.

On 11 December 2025, Inácio renewed his contract until June 2030.

== International career ==
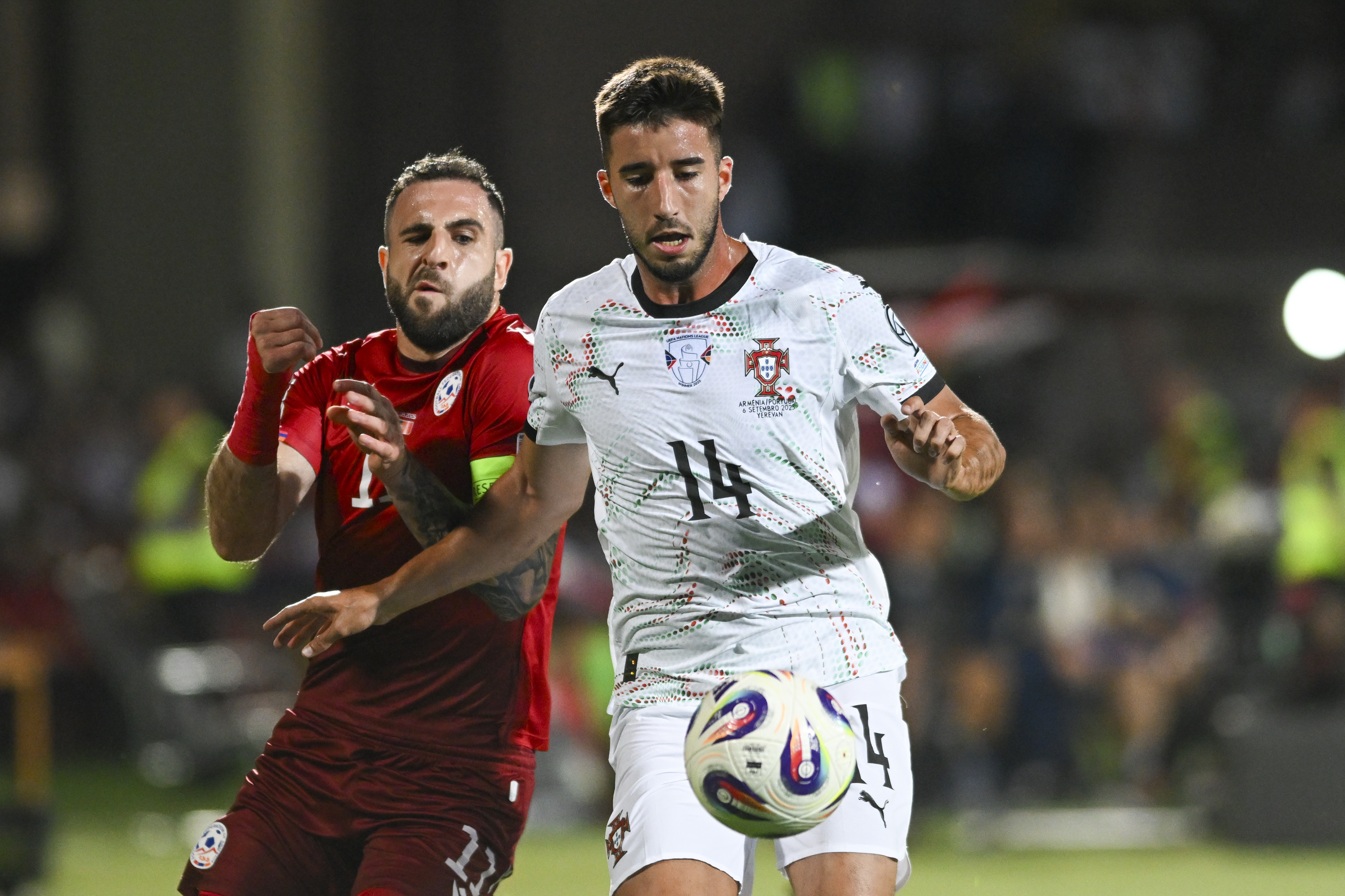
Inácio with Portugal in 2025

Inácio represented Portugal at under-17, under-18, under-19, under-20 and under-21 levels, for a total of 19 caps. He was called up to the senior side by Fernando Santos on 26 August 2021, for 2022 FIFA World Cup qualifiers against Azerbaijan and the Republic of Ireland and a friendly with Qatar. Four days later, however, he was dropped from the squad after picking up an injury on his left thigh.

On 12 November 2021, Inácio made his under-21 debut, playing the entire 1–0 win in Cyprus in the 2023 UEFA European Championship qualifying stage. He scored his first goal in the reverse fixture four days later, in a 6–0 rout in Faro.

In October 2022, Inácio was named in a preliminary 55-man squad for the 2022 FIFA World Cup in Qatar. His first appearance took place on 23 March 2023, when he played the entire 4–0 victory over Liechtenstein in the UEFA Euro 2024 qualifiers which was the first game in charge of new manager Roberto Martínez. On 11 September, still during that stage, he scored his first and second goals in a 9–0 home defeat of Luxembourg, Portugal's biggest win in international history.

Inácio was selected for the Euro 2024 finals. In the team's opening match against the Czech Republic, he replaced Diogo Dalot in the 63rd minute of the 2–1 comeback win. He also featured 90 minutes of the final group fixture, a 2–0 loss to Georgia, in a quarter-final elimination against France.

On 20 May 2025, Inácio was included in Martínez's squad for the upcoming UEFA Nations League Finals to be held in Germany. He started twice for the champions, including in the 5–3 penalty shootout defeat of Spain.

Inácio was also picked for the 2026 FIFA World Cup. He made no appearances in a round-of-16 exit.

== Style of play ==
Inácio has been predominantly deployed as a central defender, but can also play as a left-back and a midfielder due to his attributes. He is noted for his anticipation, composure, decisions, positioning, tackling and passing ability, including long-range passes which enables him to break down attacks and subsequently play the ball out or start offensive plays from the back, as well as for his acceleration, agility and pace.

== Personal life ==
Inácio was a Sporting fan since he was a child, and his brother Rodrigo was born with a disability. The former considered himself a shy person who did not feel comfortable posting about himself on social media; his favourite hobbies were playing street football and the PlayStation alone or with friends.

== Career statistics ==
=== Club ===
As of match played 21 November 2026

Appearances and goals by club, season and competition
Club	Season	League			Taça de Portugal		Taça da Liga		Europe		Other		Total	
Club	Season	Division	Apps	Goals	Apps	Goals	Apps	Goals	Apps	Goals	Apps	Goals	Apps	Goals
Sporting CP	2020–21	Primeira Liga	20	1	2	1	3	0	0	0	—		25	2
Sporting CP	2021–22	Primeira Liga	28	4	5	0	4	1	7 (Note: Appearances in UEFA Champions League)	0	1 (Note: Appearance in Supertaça Cândido de Oliveira)	0	45	5
Sporting CP	2022–23	Primeira Liga	33	1	1	0	6	2	12 (Note: Six appearances in UEFA Champions League, six appearances and one goal in UEFA Europa League)	1	—		52	4
Sporting CP	2023–24	Primeira Liga	32	1	5	0	3	0	9 (Note: Appearances in UEFA Europa League)	3	—		49	4
Sporting CP	2024–25	Primeira Liga	28	3	5	1	1	0	7	1	1	1	42	6
Sporting CP	2025–26	Primeira Liga	29	2	5	0	0	0	11	1	1	0	46	3
Sporting CP	2026–27	Primeira Liga	10	1	1	0	0	0	4	0	—		15	1
Career total			180	13	24	2	17	3	50	6	3	1	274	25

=== International ===
As of match played 10 June 2026

Appearances and goals by national team and year
National team	Year	Apps	Goals
Portugal	2023	5	2
Portugal	2024	7	0
Portugal	2025	7	0
Portugal	2026	3	0
Total		22	2

Portugal score listed first, score column indicates score after each Inácio goal.

List of international goals scored by Gonçalo Inácio
No.	Date	Venue	Opponent	Score	Result	Competition
1.	11 September 2023	Estádio Algarve, Faro/Loulé, Portugal	Luxembourg	1–0	9–0	UEFA Euro 2024 qualifying
2.	11 September 2023	Estádio Algarve, Faro/Loulé, Portugal	Luxembourg	4–0	9–0	UEFA Euro 2024 qualifying

== Honours ==
Sporting CP

- Primeira Liga: 2020–21, 2023–24, 2024–25
- Taça de Portugal: 2024–25
- Taça da Liga: 2020–21, 2021–22
- Supertaça Cândido de Oliveira: 2021

Portugal

- UEFA Nations League: 2024–25

Individual

- Primeira Liga Team of the Year: 2023–24, 2024–25
