= Matheus Reis =

Brazilian footballer

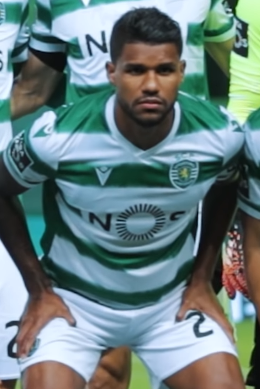
- Reis with Sporting CP in 2021

Personal information
- Full name: Matheus Reis de Lima
- Date of birth: 18 February 1995 (age 31)
- Place of birth: São João da Boa Vista, Brazil
- Height: 1.84 m (6 ft 0 in)
- Position: Defender

Team information
- Current team: CSKA Moscow
- Number: 2

Youth career
- 2008–2014: São Paulo

Senior career*
Years	Team	Apps	(Gls)
2014–2018	São Paulo	28	(0)
2014	→ Atlético Sorocaba (loan)	8	(0)
2017	→ Bahia (loan)	22	(0)
2018	→ Moreirense (loan)	2	(0)
2018–2021	Rio Ave	52	(1)
2021	→ Sporting CP (loan)	15	(0)
2021–2026	Sporting CP	125	(3)
2026–	CSKA Moscow	13	(0)
- * Club domestic league appearances and goals as of 25 October 2026

Matheus Reis de Lima (born 18 February 1995) is a Brazilian professional footballer who plays as a left-back or a centre-back for Russian Premier League club CSKA Moscow.

== Club career ==
=== São Paulo ===
Born in São João da Boa Vista, São Paulo, Reis joined São Paulo FC's academy at the age of 13. He started his senior career with Clube Atlético Sorocaba, on loan.

Reis made his debut in the Campeonato Brasileiro Série A for São Paulo on 2 July 2015, in a 2–1 away loss against Club Athletico Paranaense. In January 2017, he was loaned to fellow top-division club Esporte Clube Bahia.

On 1 January 2018, still on loan, Reis moved to Portugal with Moreirense FC. His first Primeira Liga appearance took place on 4 February, when he came on as a 79th-minute substitute for Arsénio Nunes in the 2–1 away win over C.D. Tondela.

=== Rio Ave ===
On 26 June 2018, Reis signed with Rio Ave F.C. for an undisclosed fee. He made his competitive debut one month later, in a 1–0 defeat at Jagiellonia Białystok in the second qualifying round of the UEFA Europa League.

Reis scored his only goal for the Vila do Conde-based side on 27 January 2020, their second of a 2–1 away victory over Vitória de Guimarães. After refusing to play against the same opposition early into the 2020–21 season, he was suspended by the board of directors.

=== Sporting CP ===
Reis joined Sporting CP on a five-month loan on 2 February 2021. In the summer, after his three-year contract with Rio Ave expired, he agreed to a permanent four-year deal with a €45 million buyout clause.

Reis won the 2020–21, 2023–24 and 2024–25 national championships during his tenure at the Estádio José Alvalade, contributing respectively 15, 27 and 30 games to these achievements. He made his 200th appearance for the Lions on 10 May 2025, in a 1–1 draw away to S.L. Benfica. Fifteen days later, at the start of injury time of the Taça de Portugal final against the same adversary, who led 1–0, he and teammate Maximiliano Araújo brought Andrea Belotti down as he tried to protect the ball near the corner flag, and Reis deliberately stamped on the Italian's head; no foul was awarded and Sporting went on to claim the trophy 3–1, and he subsequently boasted of his actions on social media. On 30 July, in spite of an appeal, a five-match suspension for him was confirmed.

=== CSKA Moscow ===
On 12 February 2026, Reis signed a three-and-a-half-year contract with Russian club PFC CSKA Moscow, with an option to extend for an additional season.

== Career statistics ==
As of match played 25 October 2026

Appearances and goals by club, season and competition
Club	Season	League			State league		National cup		League cup		Continental		Other		Total	
Club	Season	Division	Apps	Goals	Apps	Goals	Apps	Goals	Apps	Goals	Apps	Goals	Apps	Goals	Apps	Goals
São Paulo	2015	Série A	13	0	0	0	3	0	—		—		—		16	0
São Paulo	2016	Série A	15	0	0	0	0	0	—		1 (Note: Appearance in Copa Libertadores)	0	—		16	0
São Paulo	Total		28	0	0	0	3	0	—		1	0	—		32	0
Atlético Sorocaba (loan)	2014	—			8 (Note: Appearances in Campeonato Paulista)	0	—		—		—		—		8	0
Bahia (loan)	2017	Série A	19	0	3 (Note: Appearances in Campeonato Baiano)	0	—		—		—		4 (Note: Appearances in Copa do Nordeste)	1	26	1
Moreirense (loan)	2017–18	Primeira Liga	2	0	—		0	0	0	0	—		—		2	0
Rio Ave	2018–19	Primeira Liga	22	0	—		3	0	0	0	2 (Note: Appearances in UEFA Europa League)	0	—		27	0
Rio Ave	2019–20	Primeira Liga	30	1	—		4	0	3	0	—		—		37	1
Rio Ave	2020–21	Primeira Liga	0	0	—		0	0	0	0	2	0	—		2	0
Rio Ave	Total		52	1	—		7	0	3	0	4	0	—		66	1
Sporting CP	2020–21	Primeira Liga	15	0	—		0	0	0	0	0	0	—		15	0
Sporting CP	2021–22	Primeira Liga	26	2	—		5	0	4	0	8 (Note: Appearances in UEFA Champions League)	0	1 (Note: Appearance in Supertaça Cândido de Oliveira)	0	44	2
Sporting CP	2022–23	Primeira Liga	33	1	—		1	0	6	0	11 (Note: Six appearances in UEFA Champions League, five appearances in UEFA Europa League)	0	—		51	1
Sporting CP	2023–24	Primeira Liga	27	0	—		6	0	3	0	10	0	—		46	0
Sporting CP	2024–25	Primeira Liga	30	0	—		6	0	2	0	8	0	—		46	0
Sporting CP	2025–26	Primeira Liga	9	0	—		3	0	2	0	6	0	—		20	0
Sporting CP	Total		140	3	—		21	0	17	0	43	0	1	0	222	3
CSKA Moscow	2025–26	Russian Premier League	9	0	—		2	0	—		—		—		11	0
CSKA Moscow	2026–27	Russian Premier League	4	0	—		4	1	—		—		—		8	1
CSKA Moscow	Total		13	0	—		6	1	—		—		—		19	1
Career total			254	4	11	0	37	1	20	0	48	0	5	1	375	6

== Honours ==
Bahia

- Copa do Nordeste: 2017

Sporting CP

- Primeira Liga: 2020–21, 2023–24, 2024–25
- Taça de Portugal: 2024–25
- Supertaça Cândido de Oliveira: 2021
- Taça da Liga: 2021–22

Individual

- Primeira Liga Defender of the Month: February 2022, March 2022
- Primeira Liga Team of the Year: 2021–22
- Primeira Liga Goal of the Month: February 2023
