= Nuno Santos (footballer, born 1995) =

Portuguese footballer (born 1995)

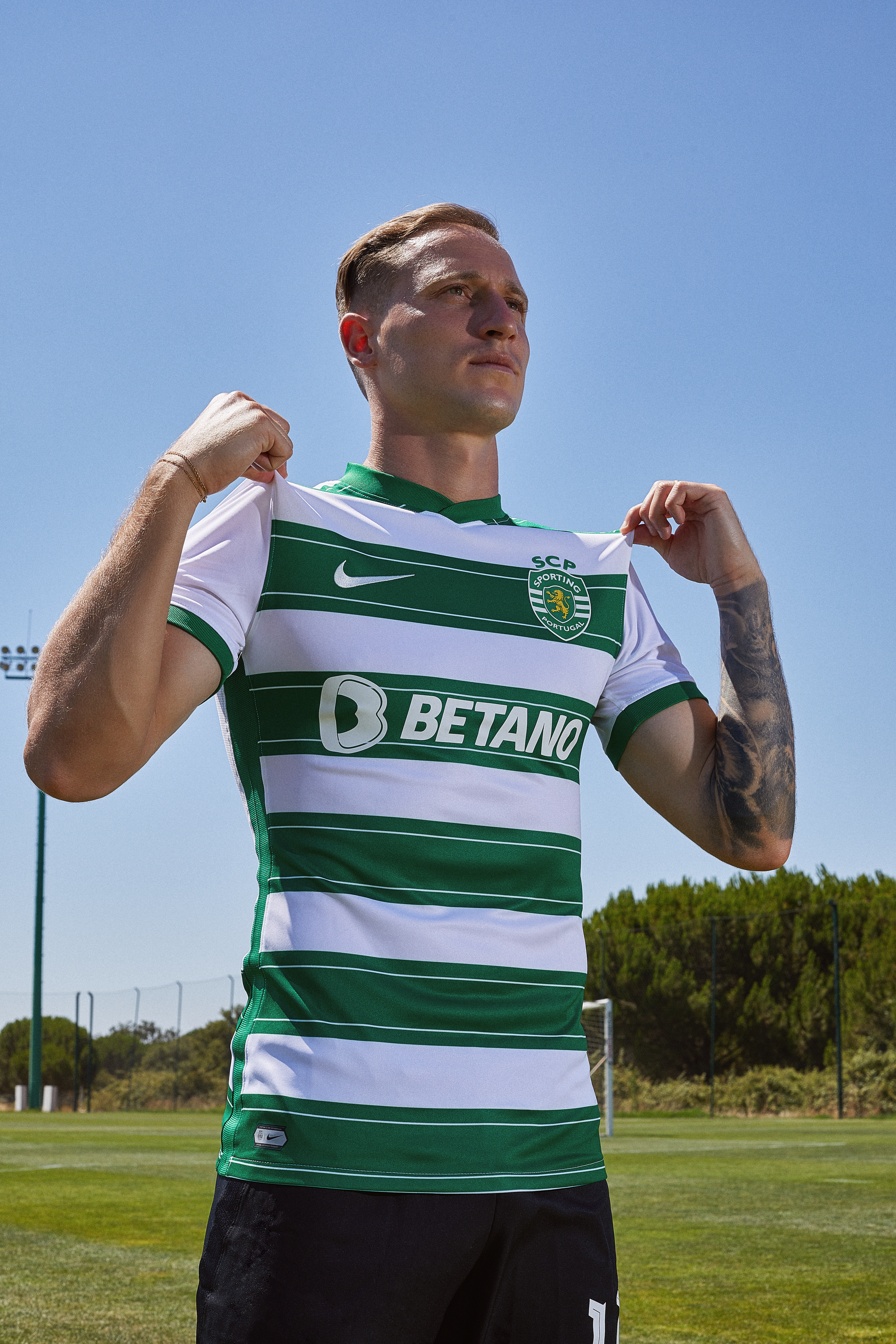
- Santos with Sporting CP in 2021

Personal information
- Full name: Nuno Miguel Gomes dos Santos
- Date of birth: 13 February 1995 (age 31)
- Place of birth: Trofa, Portugal
- Height: 1.76 m (5 ft 9 in)
- Positions: Winger; wing-back

Team information
- Current team: Sporting CP
- Number: 11

Youth career
- 2003–2005: Trofense
- 2005–2012: Porto
- 2010–2011: → Padroense (loan)
- 2012–2013: Rio Ave
- 2013–2014: Benfica

Senior career*
Years	Team	Apps	(Gls)
2014–2015	Benfica B	42	(10)
2015–2017	Benfica	1	(0)
2016–2017	→ Vitória Setúbal (loan)	26	(0)
2017–2020	Rio Ave	66	(6)
2020–	Sporting CP	136	(25)
2026–	Sporting CP B	1	(0)

International career
2010	Portugal U16	2	(0)
2012–2013	Portugal U18	10	(1)
2013–2014	Portugal U19	15	(3)
2014–2015	Portugal U20	9	(2)
2015	Portugal U21	2	(0)
Medal record
Men's football
Representing Portugal
UEFA European Under-19 Championship
Runner-up	2014 Hungary
- * Club domestic league appearances and goals as of 21:19, 4 May 2026 (UTC)

Nuno Miguel Gomes dos Santos (born 13 February 1995) is a Portuguese professional footballer who plays as a left winger or left wing-back for Sporting CP.

== Club career ==
=== Benfica ===
Born in Trofa, Porto District, Santos began his development at local C.D. Trofense before joining the ranks of FC Porto, and after a year at Rio Ave F.C. he signed for S.L. Benfica in 2013. On 30 August 2014, he made his professional debut with their reserves in the Segunda Liga, coming on as a 69th-minute substitute for João Amorim in a 3–1 home win against S.C. Covilhã. He scored eight goals in 36 games in his first season, starting in a 3–2 loss at S.C. Braga B on 14 December. On 14 February 2015, he scored twice in a 4–1 home victory over U.D. Oliveirense (4–1).

Santos made his only appearance for the first team in the Primeira Liga on 11 September 2015, playing the final 11 minutes in place of Pizzi in a 6–0 home rout of C.F. Os Belenenses. That December, he suffered an injury to his left knee that was still an issue when he signed a season-long loan to fellow top-flight club Vitória F.C. in June 2016.

=== Rio Ave ===
On 16 June 2017, Santos signed a five-year contract with Rio Ave also of the top tier. Almost exclusively a substitute in his first season, he scored once for his first goal in the league on 17 September, at the end of a 1–2 home defeat to eventual champions FC Porto.

Santos suffered more problems with his left knee in July 2018, and did not return to the pitch until the following March. On 17 June 2020, he was one of three players in his team to be sent off in a 2–1 home loss to Benfica – for a high foot on Pizzi – and was subjected to social media abuse by his club's fans.

=== Sporting CP ===
On 21 August 2020, Santos joined Sporting CP on a five-year deal for €4 million plus shares in the economic rights of Gelson Dala (50%) and Francisco Geraldes (75%), and a buyout clause of €60 million. He scored eight competitive goals in his first season for the champions, seven in the league.

As Sporting often operated on a 3–5–2 formation under Ruben Amorim, Santos was deployed as a left wing-back on several occasions. He contributed four goals in 2,073 minutes in 2023–24 to another league title, but missed the vast majority of the following campaign after rupturing the tendon of his right knee; in November 2024, he was handed an eight-match suspension for smashing a glass protection while in the stands – he was not part of the squad due to injury – and injuring two spectators (one of them seriously) during the 4–3 loss against Porto in the Supertaça Cândido de Oliveira in August but, controversially, the ban was to be served while he recovered.

Santos returned to action on 1 February 2026, playing 26 minutes for Sporting's reserves in the 2–0 second-division home win over Oliveirense. His first appearance for the main squad since his injury took place four days later, as he replaced Francisco Trincão late into the second half in a 3–2 extra-time victory against AVS Futebol SAD in the quarter-finals of the Taça de Portugal.

== International career ==
Santos was part of the Portugal squad at the 2015 FIFA U-20 World Cup, scoring an early goal against Senegal (3–0) and a late one against Colombia (3–1 win) in the group stage, in an eventual quarter-final exit in New Zealand. He won the first of his two caps for the under-21 side on 12 November of that year, replacing Rony Lopes midway through the second half of the 4–0 victory over Albania for the 2017 UEFA European Championship qualifiers held in Arouca.

In October 2022, Santos was named in a preliminary 55-man squad for the 2022 FIFA World Cup in Qatar.

== Career statistics ==
As of match played 4 May 2026

Appearances and goals by club, season and competition
Club	Season	League			Taça de Portugal		Taça da Liga		Europe		Other		Total	
Club	Season	Division	Apps	Goals	Apps	Goals	Apps	Goals	Apps	Goals	Apps	Goals	Apps	Goals
Benfica B	2014–15	Segunda Liga	36	8	—		—		—		—		36	8
Benfica B	2015–16	LigaPro	6	2	—		—		—		—		6	2
Benfica B	Total		42	10	—		—		—		—		42	10
Benfica	2015–16	Primeira Liga	1	0	1	0	0	0	0	0	0	0	2	0
Vitória Setúbal (loan)	2016–17	Primeira Liga	26	0	2	0	4	0	—		—		32	0
Rio Ave	2017–18	Primeira Liga	26	1	2	1	4	0	—		—		32	2
Rio Ave	2018–19	Primeira Liga	8	3	0	0	0	0	0	0	—		8	3
Rio Ave	2019–20	Primeira Liga	32	2	3	1	3	2	—		—		38	5
Rio Ave	Total		66	6	5	2	7	2	0	0	—		78	10
Sporting CP	2020–21	Primeira Liga	31	7	3	1	2	0	1 (Note: Appearance(s) in UEFA Europa League)	0	—		37	8
Sporting CP	2021–22	Primeira Liga	32	6	6	2	4	1	7 (Note: Appearances in UEFA Champions League)	1	1 (Note: Appearance in Supertaça Cândido de Oliveira)	0	50	10
Sporting CP	2022–23	Primeira Liga	31	8	1	0	5	0	12 (Note: Six appearances and one goal in UEFA Champions League, five appearances in UEFA Europa League)	1	—		49	9
Sporting CP	2023–24	Primeira Liga	31	4	7	1	3	1	9	0	—		50	6
Sporting CP	2024–25	Primeira Liga	7	0	1	0	0	0	2	1	0	0	10	1
Sporting CP	2025–26	Primeira Liga	4	0	2	0	0	0	2	0	0	0	8	0
Sporting CP	2026–27	Primeira Liga	0	0	0	0	0	0	0	0	—		0	0
Sporting CP	Total		136	25	20	4	14	2	33	3	1	0	204	34
Sporting CP B	2025–26	Liga Portugal 2	1	0	—		—		—		—		1	0
Career total			271	41	28	6	25	4	33	3	1	0	358	54

== Honours ==
Benfica Youth

- UEFA Youth League runner-up: 2013–14

Benfica

- Primeira Liga: 2015–16

Sporting CP

- Primeira Liga: 2020–21, 2023–24, 2024–25
- Taça de Portugal: 2024–25
- Taça da Liga: 2020–21, 2021–22
- Supertaça Cândido de Oliveira: 2021

Individual

- Primeira Liga Goal of the Month: March 2023
