= 2021 Supertaça Cândido de Oliveira =

Supertaça Cândido de Oliveira Vodafone
- Event: Supertaça Cândido de Oliveira (Portuguese Super Cup)
Sporting CP	Braga
2	1
- Date: 31 July 2021
- Venue: Estádio Municipal de Aveiro
- Man of the Match: Pedro Gonçalves (Sporting CP)
- Referee: João Pinheiro
- Attendance: 7,710 (Note: The match was played in front of a limited attendance due to the COVID-19 pandemic in Portugal.)

The 2021 Supertaça Cândido de Oliveira was the 43rd edition of the Supertaça Cândido de Oliveira. It was played between the champions of the 2020–21 Primeira Liga, Sporting CP, and winners of the 2020–21 Taça de Portugal, Braga, on 31 July 2021. Sporting CP won the match 2–1 to secure their ninth Supertaça title overall and the first since 2015.

== Venue ==
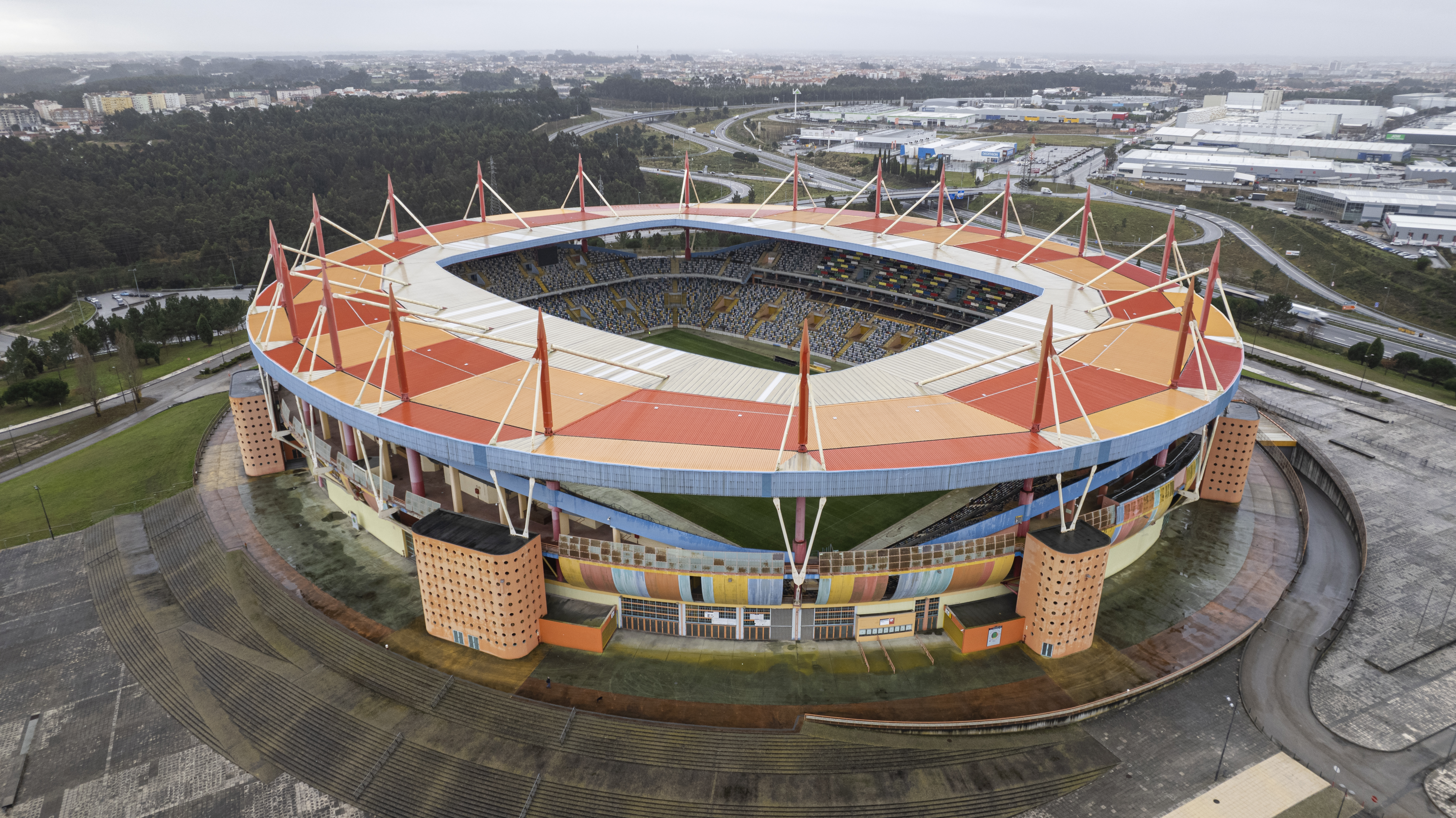
Estádio Municipal de Aveiro

The Portuguese Football Federation announced on 27 July 2021 that the Estádio Municipal de Aveiro would host this season's Supertaça with 33 percent of its capacity filled by supporters of both clubs.

This was the eleventh time the Supertaça was played at the Estádio Municipal de Aveiro, having hosted all Supertaça matches but two since 2009, both of them played at Estádio Algarve, in 2015 and 2019.

== Background ==
The match marked the return of spectators to Portuguese football for the first time after a year and a half of absence, and was noted by the two captains of Sporting CP and Braga, Sebastián Coates and Ricardo Horta, respectively, by a message that saluted the supporters before the kick-off of the game.

== Match ==
=== Details ===
31 July 2021
20:45 WEST (UTC+01:00)

Sporting CP	2–1	Braga
Cabral 29'; Gonçalves 43'	Report	Fransérgio 20'

Estádio Municipal de Aveiro, Aveiro
Attendance: 7,710
Referee: João Pinheiro

Sporting CP	Braga

GK	1	(Spain) Antonio Adán
RB	25	(Portugal) Gonçalo Inácio
CB	4	(Uruguay) Sebastián Coates (c)
LB	3	(Morocco) Zouhair Feddal		(substituted off) 80'
RM	47	(Portugal) Ricardo Esgaio
CM	6	(Portugal) João Palhinha	(yellow card) 17'
CM	8	(Brazil) Matheus Nunes	(yellow card) 49'
LM	5	(Portugal) Nuno Mendes
RF	28	(Portugal) Pedro Gonçalves	(yellow card) 44'	(substituted off) 83'
CF	21	(Portugal) Paulinho		(substituted off) 69'
LF	10	(Cape Verde) Jovane Cabral		(substituted off) 80'
Substitutes:
GK	81	(Portugal) Luís Maximiano
DF	2	(Brazil) Matheus Reis		(substituted on) 80'
DF	13	(Portugal) Luís Neto
DF	16	(Portugal) Rúben Vinagre
FW	7	(Brazil) Bruno Tabata		(substituted on) 83'
FW	11	(Portugal) Nuno Santos		(substituted on) 80'
FW	19	(Portugal) Tiago Tomás		(substituted on) 69'
Manager:
(Portugal) Ruben Amorim

GK	1	(Brazil) Matheus
RB	15	(Portugal) Paulo Oliveira
CB	34	(Brazil) Raul Silva		(substituted off) 46'
LB	5	(Portugal) Nuno Sequeira	(yellow card) 87'
RM	70	(Brazil) Fabiano Silva
CM	8	(Libya) Ali Musrati
CM	10	(Portugal) André Horta		(substituted off) 54'
LM	90	(Brazil) Galeno		(substituted off) 69'
RF	21	(Portugal) Ricardo Horta (c)
CF	9	(Spain) Abel Ruiz		(substituted off) 81'
LF	27	(Brazil) Fransérgio	(yellow card) 45+2'	(substituted off) 81'
Substitutes:
GK	12	(Portugal) Tiago Sá
DF	3	(Brazil) Vítor Tormena	(yellow card) 62'	(substituted on) 46'
DF	13	(Portugal) Tiago Esgaio
MF	7	(Portugal) João Novais	(yellow card) 90+1'	(substituted on) 81'
MF	78	(Portugal) Roger Fernandes		(substituted on) 69'
FW	19	(Spain) Mario Gonzalez		(substituted on) 54'
FW	99	(Portugal) Vítor Oliveira		(substituted on) 81'
Manager:
(Portugal) Carlos Carvalhal

Man of the Match:
(Portugal) Pedro Gonçalves (Sporting CP)

Assistant referees:
Tiago Costa
Nuno Eiras
Fourth official:
Gustavo Correia
Video assistant referee:
André Narciso
Assistant video assistant referees:
Ricardo Santos
Vasco Santos

Match rules

- 90 minutes.
- 30 minutes of extra time if necessary.
- Penalty shoot-out if scores still level.
- Seven named substitutes, of which up to five may be used during regular time. (Note: Each team was given only three opportunities to make substitutions, excluding substitutions made at half-time.)

== See also ==
- 2021–22 Primeira Liga
- 2021–22 Taça de Portugal
- 2021–22 Taça da Liga
- 2021–22 S.C. Braga season
- 2021–22 Sporting CP season
