= Nuno Mendes (footballer, born 2002) =

Portuguese footballer (born 2002)

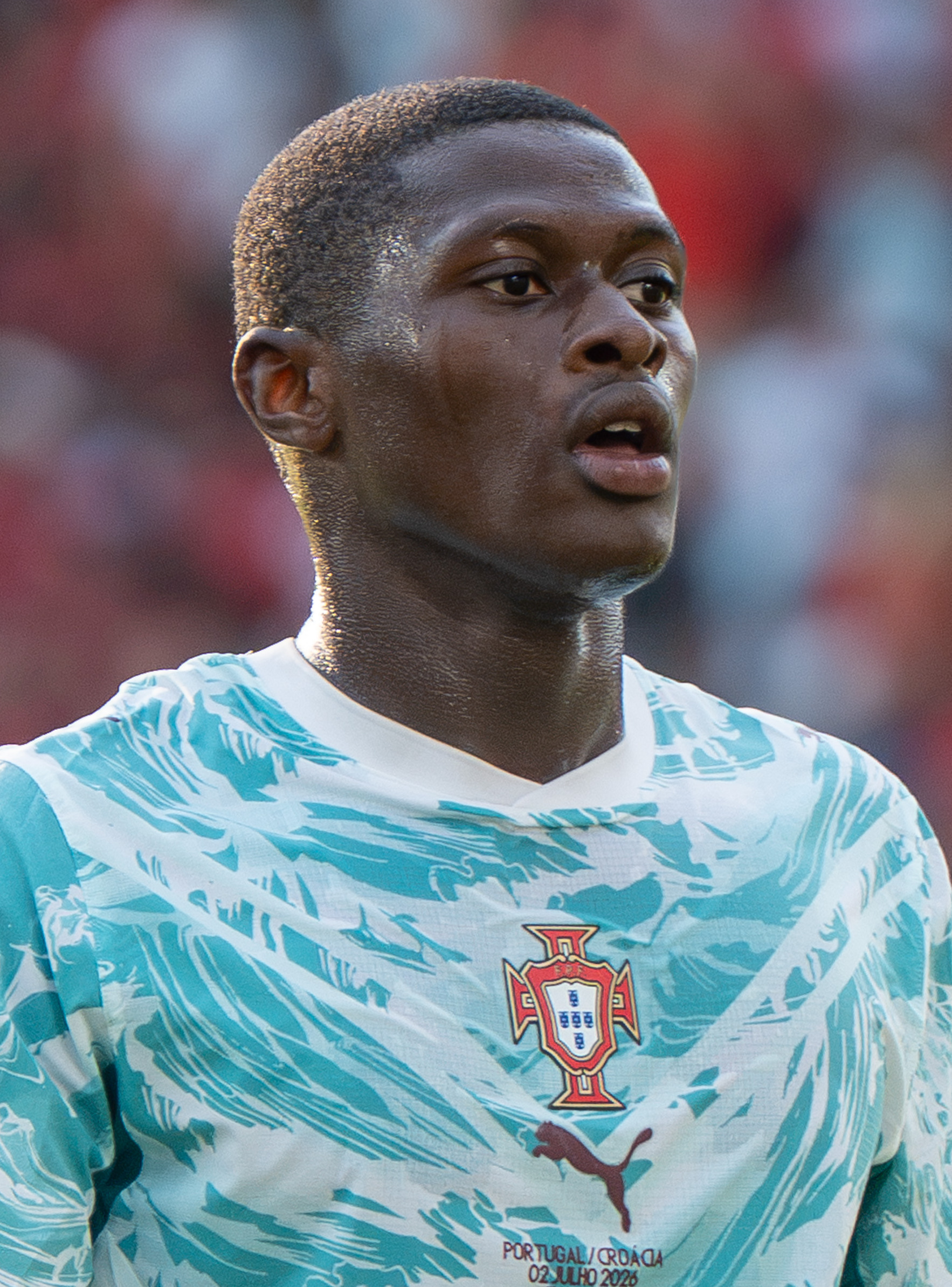
- Mendes with Portugal in 2026

Personal information
- Full name: Nuno Alexandre Tavares Mendes
- Date of birth: 19 June 2002 (age 24)
- Place of birth: Sintra, Portugal
- Height: 1.80 m (5 ft 11 in)
- Position: Left-back

Team information
- Current team: Paris Saint-Germain
- Number: 25

Youth career
- 2011–2012: Despertar
- 2012–2020: Sporting CP

Senior career*
Years	Team	Apps	(Gls)
2020–2022	Sporting CP	40	(1)
2021–2022	→ Paris Saint-Germain (loan)	27	(0)
2022–	Paris Saint-Germain	77	(7)

International career^{‡}
2018	Portugal U16	3	(0)
2018	Portugal U17	3	(0)
2019	Portugal U18	3	(0)
2019	Portugal U19	5	(0)
2020	Portugal U21	4	(0)
2021–	Portugal	53	(2)
Medal record
Men's football
Representing Portugal
UEFA Nations League
Winner	2025 Germany
- * Club domestic league appearances and goals as of 17:02, 21 November 2026 (UTC) ‡ National team caps and goals as of 21:43, 4 October 2026 (UTC)

Nuno Alexandre Tavares Mendes (Portuguese pronunciation: [ˈnunu ˈmẽdɨʃ]; born 19 June 2002) is a Portuguese professional footballer who plays as a left-back for Ligue 1 club Paris Saint-Germain and the Portugal national team. He is widely regarded as one of the best left-backs in the world.

He came through Sporting CP's youth academy, making his first-team debut in 2020 and winning a double of Primeira Liga and Taça da Liga the following season while being named in the Primeira Liga Team of the Year. In August 2021, he moved to Paris Saint-Germain on loan, joining permanently for €38 million in June 2022. In 2024–25, he was a prominent player as they attained a continental treble; he won several honours during his spell at the latter club, including five Ligue 1 titles and back-to-back Champions Leagues in 2025 and 2026.

Mendes represented Portugal at various youth levels. He made his full debut in 2021, and was chosen in the squads for two World Cups and as many European Championships. He won the UEFA Nations League in 2025, being named the best player of the finals.

== Club career ==
=== Early career ===
Born in Sintra, Lisbon District of Cape Verdean descent, Mendes started playing football aged 9, and his idols growing up were Cristiano Ronaldo, Lionel Messi, David Alaba and Marcelo, the two last players being the ones he tried to emulate. He was invited to play for local club Despertar by his school teacher Bruno Botelho on the outskirts of Lisbon. He quickly stood out, subsequently catching the eye of Benfica, Porto and Sporting CP and joining the latter's youth system at the age of 10.

During his scouting process, as he returned home from school, Mendes realised he was being followed by a man. For fear of being robbed, he ran home, located in a very poor neighbourhood; the "stalker" was actually a Sporting scout, who later convinced him to sign. He spent the next four years making a two-hour round trip in order to train every night with his teacher, before moving to Sporting's academy at the age of 14.

Mendes initially played as an attacking midfielder before being converted to a left-back, a position he struggled with in the beginning.

=== Sporting CP ===
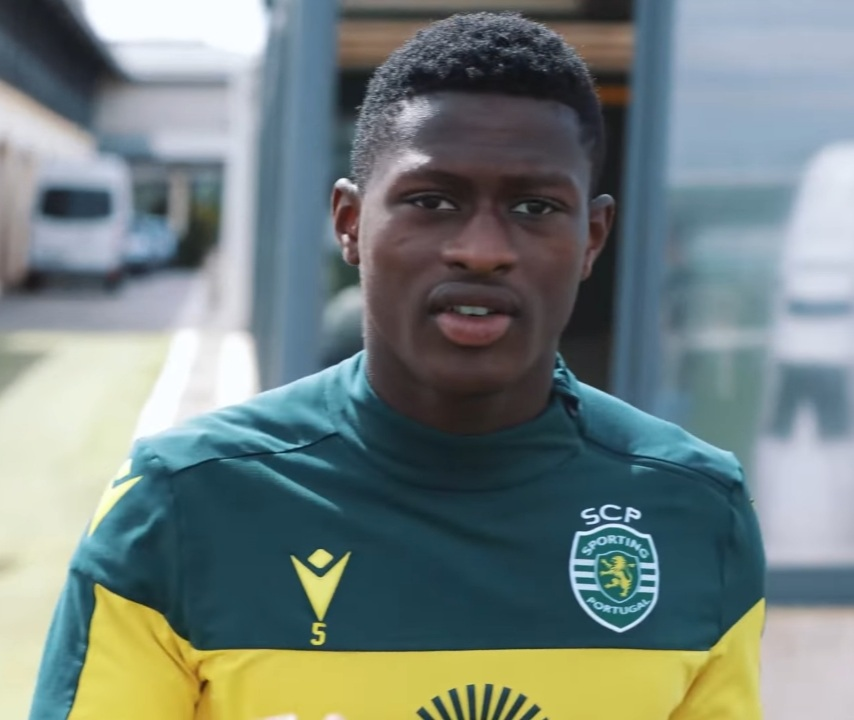
Mendes with Sporting CP in 2021

Following the outbreak of the COVID-19 pandemic in February, which brought a premature end to the youth football season, Mendes was one of a small group of youth players to be called up to the first team by manager Ruben Amorim, despite having only played once since November due to an injury. He made his professional debut in a 1–0 Primeira Liga home win against Paços de Ferreira on 12 June 2020, as a 72nd-minute substitute for Marcos Acuña.

After the latter left for Sevilla in the 2020 off-season, Mendes became first choice at only 18, becoming the youngest player to make the club's starting XI since Ronaldo in September 2002; he went onto start six of his side's seven remaining league matches. He scored his first competitive goal for them on 4 October of the same year, in the 2–0 away victory over Portimonense.

Mendes agreed to a contract extension on 19 December 2020, increasing his buyout clause from €45 million to €70 million. He played 29 games for the eventual champions, while also being named in the Team of the Year.

On 31 July 2021, Mendes provided an assist for Jovane Cabral in the 2–1 defeat of Braga and conquest of the Supertaça Cândido de Oliveira.

=== Paris Saint-Germain ===
==== 2021–23: First league titles and Ligue Young Player of the Year ====
On 31 August 2021, Mendes joined Paris Saint-Germain on a season-long loan with an option to buy. He made his Ligue 1 debut for the club on 11 September, coming on as a 85th-minute substitute in a 4–0 defeat of Clermont. He appeared in his first game in the UEFA Champions League four days later, replacing Abdou Diallo 75 minutes into a 1–1 draw away to Club Brugge in the group stage; he had an instant impact on the pitch, notably making a "brilliant" run to set up a shooting opportunity for Lionel Messi at the 77th minute. He made his first start later that month, in a 2–1 win over Lyon. He helped PSG to win their record-tying 10th national championship by making 27 appearances (18 starts), and later was nominated to the Young Player of the Year award and named to the Team of the Year alongside two of his teammates.

On 31 May 2022, Mendes' buyout clause of €38 million was triggered and he signed a permanent four-year contract. He scored his first official goal on 3 September, closing a 3–0 away victory against Nantes. His first in the Champions League came on 2 November, the winner in a 2–1 victory away to Juventus in the last group fixture. During the season, he was a key contributor to his team's record 11th title, winning the Young Player of the Year and being included in the Team of the Year in the process.

==== 2023–present: Champions League titles and further domestic honours ====
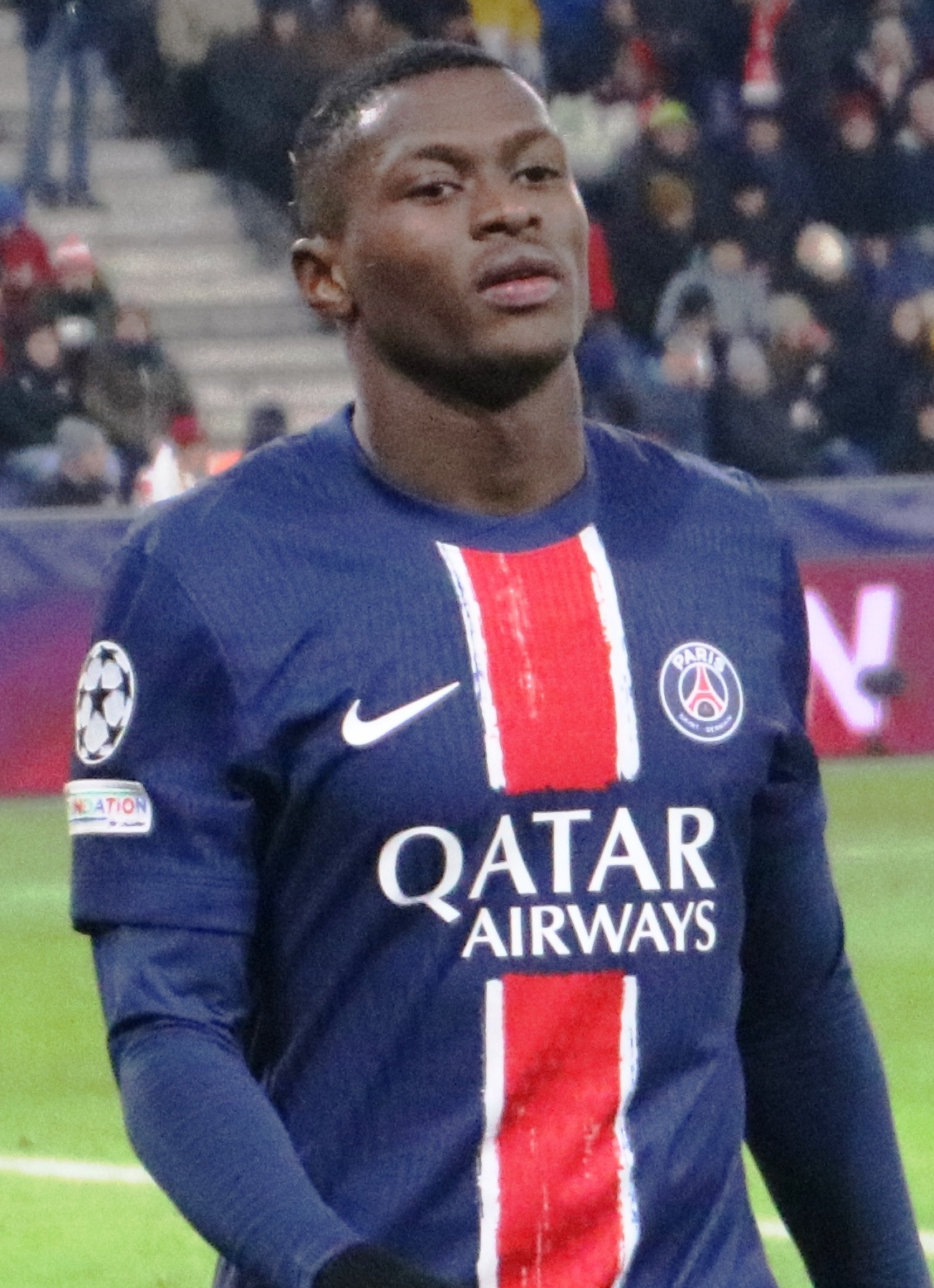
Mendes with Paris Saint-Germain in 2024

Mendes had suffered from a hamstring injury since May 2023, and was successfully operated in October by surgeon Lasse Lempainen in Turku, Finland. He only made his return on 25 February 2024, playing 20 minutes of the 1–1 league home draw against Rennes in place of Lucas Hernandez. He eventually helped his team to reach the Champions League semi-finals, where they were knocked out by Borussia Dortmund 2–0 on aggregate; they also won the domestic treble with record-extending successes in Ligue 1, the Coupe de France and the Trophée des Champions, with the player only not taking part in the latter due to his injury.

On 9 February 2025, Mendes agreed to an extension until 2029. Ten days later, in the second leg of the Champions League knockout phase play-offs, he scored PSG's fifth goal in the 7–0 win over fellow French Brest, helping his side to a 10–0 aggregate victory; he also found the net in both legs of the quarter-finals against Aston Villa (3–1 home victory, 3–2 away loss), achieving the continental treble by winning the Ligue 1, the Coupe de France and a first-ever Champions League after a 5–0 defeat of Inter Milan in the final, being named in the latter competition's Team of the Season; his performances led to him emerging as a contender for the 2025 Ballon d'Or, finally ranking 10th.

On 5 October 2025, Mendes scored the first free kick of his career, opening a 1–1 away draw against Lille. After helping his team to the 12th league title in 14 years, he won his second Champions League at the end of the campaign; in the final against Arsenal, however, he had his attempt in the penalty shootout saved by David Raya.

== International career ==
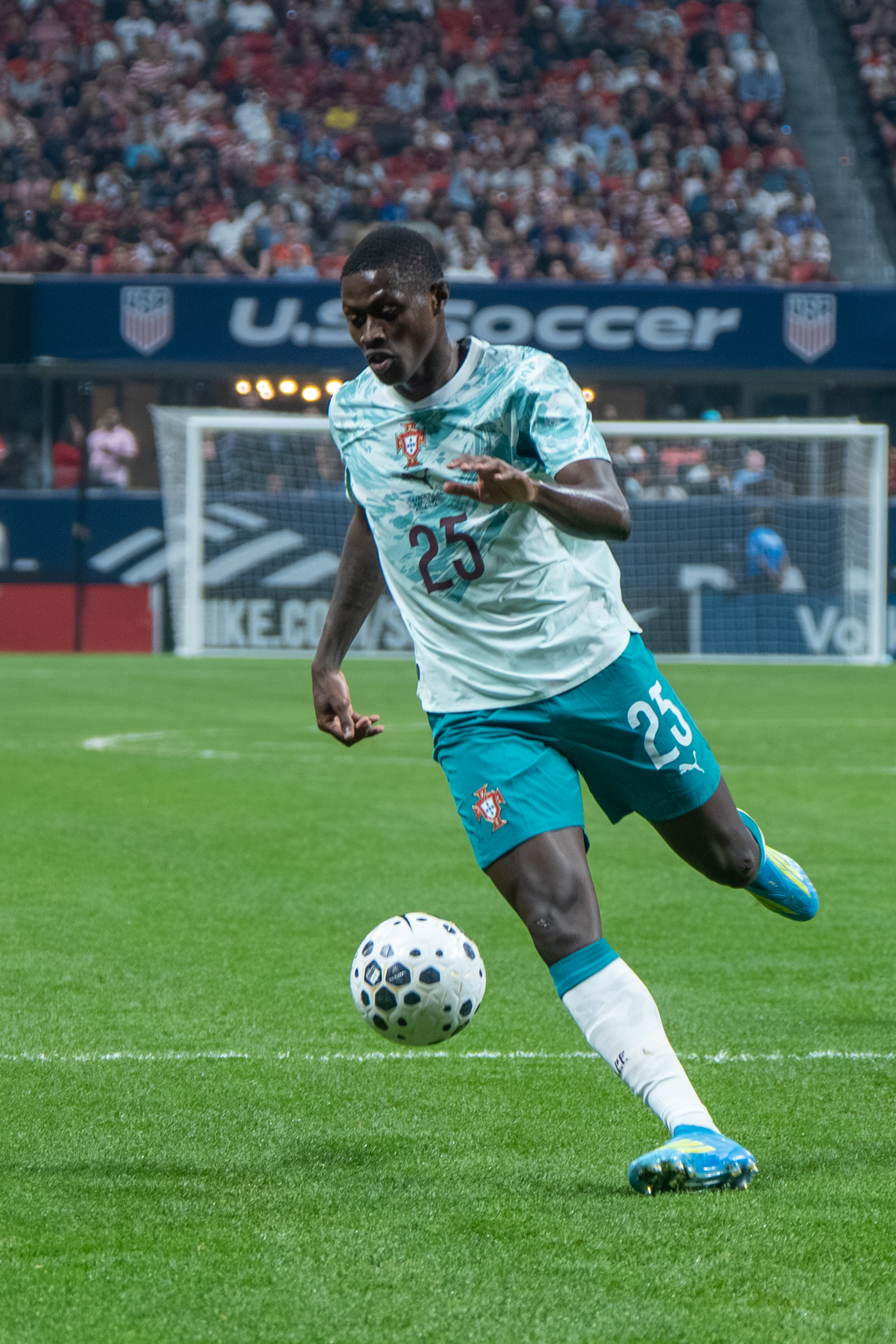
Mendes with Portugal in 2026

Mendes earned his first cap for Portugal at under-21 level shortly after having made his club debut, in a 4–0 win in Cyprus for the 2021 UEFA European Championship qualifiers on 4 September 2020. Previously, he represented the nation's under-16, under-17, under-18 and under-19s.

Six months later, Mendes was called up to the senior team by manager Fernando Santos for 2022 FIFA World Cup qualifying matches against Azerbaijan, Luxembourg and Serbia, and subsequently removed from the under-21 squad due to appear in the finals. He first appeared with the former on 24 March 2021, playing the entire 1–0 victory against Azerbaijan.

Mendes was selected for UEFA Euro 2020, playing no games in a round-of-16 exit. Santos later revealed that he had planned to use him alongside Raphaël Guerreiro during the tournament, but could not do so due to injury problems.

In November 2022, Mendes was named in the final squad for the World Cup in Qatar. After a first-half thigh injury in the second group-stage match against Uruguay, he missed the rest of the competition.

During qualifying for Euro 2024, Mendes made one appearance against Luxembourg, assisting Cristiano Ronaldo's opening goal of the 6–0 win in the ninth minute; he missed the remainder of the campaign with a hamstring injury, as Portugal won all ten matches in Group J. He was picked for the finals in Germany, starting against the Czech Republic and Turkey in the group phase and Slovenia (3–0 victory in a penalty shootout) and France in the knockout stage (5–3 loss in another shootout).

Mendes was selected for the 2025 UEFA Nations League Finals. On 4 June, he assisted Ronaldo for the 2–1 winner in the semi-finals against Germany. He scored his first international goal four days later in a 2–2 draw against Spain in the final; he was crucial in defending Lamine Yamal throughout the match, and also converted his attempt in the 5–3 shootout win, being named player of the match and best player of the tournament.

Mendes was included in the 2026 World Cup squad. On 23 June, he scored a free kick in the 5–0 group win over Uzbekistan for his first goal in the competition, with the set piece reportedly catching the opposition off guard as many expected Ronaldo to take it instead.

== Style of play ==
Mendes playing for Portugal at the 2026 FIFA World Cup

Mendes is known for his offensive capabilities, speed and technical qualities, playing mainly as a left-sided attacking full-back or wing-back, which allows him to create danger either from a standing start or whilst on the counter-attack. Apart from his dribbling, he boasts an excellent crossing ability whether tightly marked or open in space, and his physical prowess allows him to beat out opponents to the ball either with his speed or strength. He is also capable of anticipating attacks and cutting in front of a pass and winning the ball back.

Despite his ability going forward, however, the defensive side of Mendes's game was brought into question by pundits early into his career, with the latter citing the inconsistency on his decision-making in front of goal, positioning and awareness as areas of weakness in need of improvement. Over the following years, however, under Luis Enrique at Paris Saint-Germain, he became more tactically disciplined, displaying better judgment on when to push forward and when to hold his line. His one-on-one defending matured, committing fewer rash challenges while displaying greater awareness of space and opponents' movement. These developments were particularly evident in high-stakes matches, where his defensive performances against players such as Mohamed Salah and Yamal drew praise from pundits and coaches alike, marking his improvement into a more complete and balanced full-back.

== Career statistics ==
=== Club ===
As of match played 21 November 2026

Appearances and goals by club, season and competition
Club	Season	League			National cup (Note: Includes Taça de Portugal, Coupe de France)		League cup (Note: Includes Taça da Liga)		Continental		Other		Total	
Club	Season	Division	Apps	Goals	Apps	Goals	Apps	Goals	Apps	Goals	Apps	Goals	Apps	Goals
Sporting CP	2019–20	Primeira Liga	9	0	0	0	0	0	0	0	0	0	9	0
Sporting CP	2020–21	Primeira Liga	29	1	2	0	2	0	2 (Note: Appearances in UEFA Europa League)	0	—		35	1
Sporting CP	2021–22	Primeira Liga	2	0	—		—		—		1 (Note: Appearance in Supertaça Cândido de Oliveira)	0	3	0
Sporting CP	Total		40	1	2	0	2	0	2	0	1	0	47	1
Paris Saint-Germain (loan)	2021–22	Ligue 1	27	0	2	0	—		8 (Note: Appearances in UEFA Champions League)	0	—		37	0
Paris Saint-Germain	2022–23	Ligue 1	23	1	2	0	—		6	1	1 (Note: Appearance in Trophée des Champions)	0	32	2
Paris Saint-Germain	2023–24	Ligue 1	6	1	3	0	—		5	0	0	0	14	1
Paris Saint-Germain	2024–25	Ligue 1	24	1	5	0	—		16	4	8 (Note: One appearance in Trophée des Champions, seven appearances in FIFA Club World Cup)	0	53	5
Paris Saint-Germain	2025–26	Ligue 1	20	4	1	0	—		17	2	3 (Note: One appearance in UEFA Super Cup, one appearance in FIFA Intercontinental Cup, one appearance in Trophée des Champions)	0	41	6
Paris Saint-Germain	2026–27	Ligue 1	4	0	0	0	—		2	0	2 (Note: One appearance in UEFA Super Cup, one appearance in Trophée des Champions)	0	8	0
Paris Saint-Germain	PSG total		104	7	13	0	—		54	7	14	0	185	14
Career total			144	8	15	0	2	0	56	7	15	0	232	15

=== International ===
As of match played 4 October 2026

Appearances and goals by national team and year
National team	Year	Apps	Goals
Portugal	2021	11	0
Portugal	2022	7	0
Portugal	2023	1	0
Portugal	2024	14	0
Portugal	2025	8	1
Portugal	2026	12	1
Total		53	2

As of match played 23 June 2026
Scores and results list Portugal's goal tally first, score column indicates score after each Mendes goal.

List of international goals scored by Nuno Mendes
No.	Date	Venue	Cap	Opponent	Score	Result	Competition
1	8 June 2025	Allianz Arena, Munich, Germany	37	Spain	1–1	2–2 (a.e.t.) (5–3 p)	2025 UEFA Nations League Finals
2	23 June 2026	NRG Stadium, Houston, United States	46	Uzbekistan	2–0	5–0	2026 FIFA World Cup

== Honours ==
Sporting CP

- Primeira Liga: 2020–21
- Taça da Liga: 2020–21
- Supertaça Cândido de Oliveira: 2021

Paris Saint-Germain

- Ligue 1: 2021–22, 2022–23, 2023–24, 2024–25, 2025–26
- Coupe de France: 2023–24, 2024–25
- Trophée des Champions: 2022, 2024, 2025
- UEFA Champions League: 2024–25, 2025–26
- UEFA Super Cup: 2025, 2026
- FIFA Intercontinental Cup: 2025
- FIFA Club World Cup runner-up: 2025

Portugal

- UEFA Nations League: 2024–25

Individual

- Primeira Liga Team of the Year: 2020–21
- IFFHS Men's Youth (U20) World Team: 2021, 2022
- Ligue 1 Young Player of the Year: 2022–23
- UNFP Ligue 1 Team of the Year: 2021–22, 2022–23, 2024–25
- UEFA Champions League Team of the Season: 2024–25, 2025–26
- The Athletic European Men's Team of the Season: 2024–25
- UEFA Nations League Finals Player of the Tournament: 2025
- FIFA Club World Cup Team of the Tournament: 2025
- FIFPRO World 11: 2025, 2026
- FIFA Men's World 11: 2025
