= 2021–22 Sporting CP season =

Sporting CP
2021–22 season
- President: Frederico Varandas
- Head coach: Ruben Amorim
- Stadium: Estádio José Alvalade
- Primeira Liga: 2nd
- Taça de Portugal: Semi-finals
- Taça da Liga: Winners
- Supertaça Cândido de Oliveira: Winners
- UEFA Champions League: Round of 16
- Top goalscorer: League: Pablo Sarabia (15); All: Pablo Sarabia (21)
- Highest home attendance: 48,129 Sporting CP 0–5 Manchester City 15 de fevereiro de 2022
- Lowest home attendance: 9,066 Sporting CP 3–0 F.C Vizela 06 de agosto de 2021
- Average home league attendance: 25,158
Home colours	Away colours	Third colours

The 2021–22 season was the 116th season in the existence of Sporting CP and the club's 88th consecutive season in the top flight of Portuguese football. In addition to the domestic league, Sporting CP participated in this season's editions of the Taça de Portugal, the Taça da Liga, the Supertaça Cândido de Oliveira and the UEFA Champions League.

== Players ==
=== First-team squad ===
As of 1 February 2022

Note: Flags indicate national team as defined under FIFA eligibility rules; some limited exceptions apply. Players may hold more than one non-FIFA nationality.

No.	Pos.	Nation	Player
1	GK	ESP	Antonio Adán
2	DF	BRA	Matheus Reis
3	DF	MAR	Zouhair Feddal
4	DF	URU	Sebastián Coates (captain)
6	MF	POR	João Palhinha (3rd captain)
7	FW	BRA	Bruno Tabata
8	MF	POR	Matheus Nunes
9	FW	ALG	Islam Slimani
11	FW	POR	Nuno Santos
13	DF	POR	Luís Neto (vice-captain)
15	MF	URU	Manuel Ugarte
16	DF	POR	Rúben Vinagre (on loan from Wolverhampton)
17	MF	ESP	Pablo Sarabia (on loan from Paris Saint-Germain)

No.	Pos.	Nation	Player
21	FW	POR	Paulinho
22	GK	POR	André Paulo
23	MF	ENG	Marcus Edwards
24	DF	ESP	Pedro Porro (on loan from Manchester City)
25	DF	POR	Gonçalo Inácio
28	MF	POR	Pedro Gonçalves
31	GK	POR	João Virgínia (on loan from Everton)
47	DF	POR	Ricardo Esgaio
68	MF	POR	Daniel Bragança
71	DF	POR	Flávio Nazinho
84	MF	POR	Dário Essugo
87	DF	POR	Gonçalo Esteves

=== Other players under contract ===
Note: Flags indicate national team as defined under FIFA eligibility rules; some limited exceptions apply. Players may hold more than one non-FIFA nationality.

No.	Pos.	Nation	Player
40	GK	BRA	Renan Ribeiro
91	FW	POR	Rodrigo Ribeiro

=== Out on loan ===
Note: Flags indicate national team as defined under FIFA eligibility rules; some limited exceptions apply. Players may hold more than one non-FIFA nationality.

No.	Pos.	Nation	Player
—	DF	POR	Eduardo Quaresma (at Tondela until 30 June 2022)
—	DF	POR	Nuno Mendes (at Paris Saint-Germain until 30 June 2022)
—	DF	POR	Tiago Ilori (at Boavista until 30 June 2022)
—	MF	ARG	Rodrigo Battaglia (at Mallorca until 30 June 2022)
—	MF	BRA	Carlos Jatobá (at Santo André until 31 December 2022)
—	MF	BRA	Eduardo Henrique (at Al Raed until 30 June 2022)
—	MF	CIV	Idrissa Doumbia (at Zulte Waregem until 30 June 2022)
—	MF	POR	Filipe Chaby (at Nacional until 30 June 2022)

No.	Pos.	Nation	Player
—	FW	BRA	Luiz Phellype (at OFI until 30 June 2022)
—	FW	CPV	Jovane Cabral (at Lazio until 30 June 2022)
—	FW	ECU	Gonzalo Plata (at Valladolid until 30 June 2022)
—	FW	POR	Pedro Marques (at Famalicão until 30 June 2022)
—	FW	POR	Pedro Mendes (at Rio Ave until 30 June 2022)
—	FW	POR	Rafael Camacho (at Belenenses SAD until 30 June 2022)
—	FW	POR	Tiago Tomás (at Stuttgart until 30 June 2023)
—	FW	SLO	Andraž Šporar (at Middlesbrough until 30 June 2022)

== Transfers ==
=== In ===
No.	Pos.	Player	Transferred from	Fee	Date	Source
	MF	(Croatia) Josip Mišić	(Croatia) Dinamo Zagreb	Return from loan	1 June 2021	
47	DF	(Portugal) Ricardo Esgaio	(Portugal) Braga	€5,500,000	3 July 2021	
16	DF	(Portugal) Rúben Vinagre	(England) Wolverhampton Wanderers	Loan	9 July 2021	
15	MF	(Uruguay) Manuel Ugarte	(Portugal) Famalicão	€6,500,000	9 August 2021	
31	GK	(Portugal) João Virgínia	(Portugal) Everton	Loan	24 August 2021	
17	MF	(Spain) Pablo Sarabia	(France) Paris Saint-Germain	Loan (fee €2,000,000)	1 September 2021	

Total Spending = €14,000,000

=== Out ===
No.	Pos.	Player	Transferred to	Fee	Date	Source
	MF	(Croatia) Josip Mišić	(Croatia) Dinamo Zagreb	€2,000,000	2 June 2021	
27	DF	(Portugal) João Pereira	Retired		1 July 2021	

== Pre-season and friendlies ==
Win Draw Loss Fixtures

14 July 2021 Friendly	Sporting CP (Portugal)	Cancelled	(Belgium) Gent	Portugal
20:30 WEST (UTC+1)

14 July 2021 Friendly	Sporting CP (Portugal)	2–2	(Portugal) Portimonense	Parchal, Portugal
20:00 WEST (UTC+1)	Inácio 28'; Bragança 85'	Report	Renato 65', 88'	Stadium: Estádio Municipal Bela Vista

15 July 2021 Friendly	Sporting CP (Portugal)	2–1	(Portugal) Belenenses SAD	Parchal, Portugal
20:00 WEST (UTC+1)	Sandro 5' (o.g.); Cabral 32' (pen.)	Report	Ndour 21'	Stadium: Estádio Municipal Bela Vista

20 July 2021 Friendly	Sporting CP (Portugal)	2–0	(France) Angers	Faro, Portugal
20:00 WEST (UTC+1)	Tabata (yellow card) 59'; Feddal (yellow card) 60'; Inácio 63'; Paulinho 86'	Report	Thomas (yellow card) 50'	Stadium: Estádio Algarve

25 July 2021 Friendly	Sporting CP (Portugal)	3–2	(France) Lyon	Lisbon, Portugal
21:00 WEST (UTC+1)	Mendes (yellow card) 23'; Paulinho 31', 49'; Gonçalves 35'	Report	Aouar 8'; Slimani 90+2'	Stadium: Estádio José Alvalade

== Competitions ==
=== Overall record ===
Competition	First match	Last match	Starting round	Final position	Record							
Competition	First match	Last match	Starting round	Final position	Pld	W	D	L	GF	GA	GD	Win %
Primeira Liga	6 August 2021	14 May 2022	Matchday 1	2nd	34	27	4	3	73	23	+50	79.41
Taça de Portugal	15 October 2021	21 April 2022	Third round	Semi-finals	6	4	0	2	13	5	+8	66.67
Taça da Liga	26 October 2021	29 January 2022	Third round	Winners	4	4	0	0	7	3	+4	100.00
Supertaça Cândido de Oliveira	31 July 2021		Final	Winners	1	1	0	0	2	1	+1	100.00
UEFA Champions League	15 September 2021	9 March 2022	Group stage	Round of 16	8	3	1	4	14	17	−3	37.50
Total					53	39	5	9	109	49	+60	73.58

Last updated: 14 May 2022
Source: Soccerway

=== Primeira Liga ===
==== League table ====
Pos	Team	Pld	W	D	L	GF	GA	GD	Pts	Qualification or relegation
1	Porto (C)	34	29	4	1	86	22	+64	91	Qualification for the Champions League group stage
2	Sporting CP	34	27	4	3	73	23	+50	85	Qualification for the Champions League group stage
3	Benfica	34	23	5	6	78	30	+48	74	Qualification for the Champions League third qualifying round
4	Braga	34	19	8	7	52	31	+21	65	Qualification for the Europa League group stage (Note: Since the winners of the 2021–22 Taça de Portugal, Porto, qualified for the Champions League based on league position, the spot awarded to the fourth-placed team (Europa Conference League third qualifying round) was passed to the fifth-placed team, and the spot awarded to the fifth-placed team (Europa Conference League second qualifying round) was passed to the sixth-placed team.)
5	Gil Vicente	34	13	12	9	47	42	+5	51	Qualification for the Europa Conference League third qualifying round

Source: Liga Portugal
Rules for classification: 1) Points; 2) Head-to-head points; 3) Head-to-head goal difference; 4) Head-to-head away goals scored; 5) Goal difference; 6) Matches won; 7) Goals scored; 8) Play-off.
(C) Champions

==== Results summary ====
Overall								Home						Away					
Pld	W	D	L	GF	GA	GD	Pts	W	D	L	GF	GA	GD	W	D	L	GF	GA	GD
34	27	4	3	73	23	+50	85	14	1	2	34	8	+26	13	3	1	39	15	+24

Last updated: 14 May 2022.
Source: Liga Portugal

==== Results by round ====
Round	1	2	3	4	5	6	7	8	9	10	11	12	13	14	15	16	17	18	19	20	21	22	23	24	25	26	27	28	29	30	31	32	33	34
Ground	H	A	H	A	H	A	H	A	H	H	A	H	A	H	A	H	A	A	H	A	H	A	H	A	H	A	A	H	A	H	A	H	A	H
Result	W	W	W	D	D	W	W	W	W	W	W	W	W	W	W	W	L	W	L	W	W	D	W	D	W	W	W	W	W	L	W	W	W	W
Position	1	1	1	3	4	3	3	3	3	2	2	2	2	2	2	2	2	2	2	2	2	2	2	2	2	2	2	2	2	2	2	2	2	2

Updated to match(es) played on 14 May 2022. Source: Liga Portugal
A = Away; H = Home; W = Win; D = Draw; L = Loss

==== Matches ====
6 August 2021 1	Sporting CP	3–0	Vizela	Lisbon
20:15 WEST (UTC+1)	Cabral (penalty missed) 32'; Gonçalves 48', 64'; Paulinho 74'	Report		Stadium: Estádio José Alvalade; Attendance: 9,066; Referee: António Nobre

14 August 2021 2	Braga	1–2	Sporting CP	Braga
20:30 WEST (UTC+1)	Ruiz 90+2'	Report	Cabral 40'; Gonçalves 50'	Stadium: Estádio Municipal de Braga; Attendance: 7,009; Referee: Luís Godinho

21 August 2021 3	Sporting CP	2–0	Belenenses SAD	Lisbon
20:30 WEST (UTC+1)	Inácio 7'; Palhinha 48'	Report		Stadium: Estádio José Alvalade; Attendance: 13,145; Referee: Manuel Oliveira

28 August 2021 4	Famalicão	1–1	Sporting CP	Vila Nova de Famalicão
20:30 WEST (UTC+1)	Mendes 68' (o.g.)	Report	Palhinha 82'	Stadium: Estádio Municipal de Famalicão; Attendance: 1,332; Referee: Fábio Veríssimo

11 September 2021 5	Sporting CP	1–1	Porto	Lisbon
20:30 WEST (UTC+1)	Santos 16'	Report	Díaz 71'	Stadium: Estádio José Alvalade; Attendance: 18,723; Referee: Nuno Almeida

19 September 2021 6	Estoril	0–1	Sporting CP	Estoril
20:30 WEST (UTC+1)		Report	Pedro Porro 67'	Stadium: Estádio António Coimbra da Mota; Attendance: 1,987; Referee: Tiago Martins

24 September 2021 7	Sporting CP	1–0	Marítimo	Lisbon
19:00 WEST (UTC+1)	Pedro Porro 90+8' (pen.)	Report		Stadium: Estádio José Alvalade; Attendance: 18,741; Referee: João Pinheiro

2 October 2021 8	Arouca	1–2	Sporting CP	Arouca
20:30 WEST (UTC+1)	Dabbagh 51'	Report	Nunes 16'; Santos 54'	Stadium: Estádio Municipal de Arouca; Attendance: 3,338; Referee: Rui Costa

23 October 2021 9	Sporting CP	1–0	Moreirense	Lisbon
20:30 WEST (UTC+1)	Coates 16'	Report		Stadium: Estádio José Alvalade; Attendance: 35,882; Referee: Vítor Ferreira

30 October 2021 10	Sporting CP	1–0	Vitória de Guimarães	Lisbon
21:15 WEST (UTC+1)	Coates 31'	Report		Stadium: Estádio José Alvalade; Attendance: 21,472; Referee: Rui Costa

7 November 2021 11	Paços de Ferreira	0–2	Sporting CP	Paços de Ferreira
19:00 WET (UTC±0)		Report	Inácio 47'; Gonçalves 69'	Stadium: Estádio da Mata Real; Attendance: 5,903; Referee: Luís Godinho

28 November 2021 12	Sporting CP	2–0	Tondela	Lisbon
18:00 WET (UTC±0)	Sarabia 10'; Paulinho 50'	Report		Stadium: Estádio José Alvalade; Attendance: 34,058; Referee: Hugo Miguel

3 December 2021 13	Benfica	1–3	Sporting CP	Lisbon
21:15 WET (UTC±0)	Pizzi 90+5'	Report	Pablo Sarabia 8'; Paulinho 62'; Matheus Nunes 68'	Stadium: Estádio da Luz; Attendance: 48,790; Referee: Artur Soares Dias

11 December 2021 14	Sporting CP	2–0	Boavista	Lisbon
20:30 WET (UTC±0)	Sarabia 53'; Nuno Santos 59'	Report		Stadium: Estádio José Alvalade; Attendance: 18,551; Referee: Nuno Almeida

18 December 2021 15	Gil Vicente	0–3	Sporting CP	Barcelos
20:30 WET (UTC±0)		Report	Santos 53'; Inácio 64'; Bragança 90+3'	Stadium: Estádio Cidade de Barcelos; Attendance: 4,730; Referee: Tiago Martins

29 December 2021 16	Sporting CP	3–2	Portimonense	Lisbon
21:00 WET (UTC±0)	Paulinho 65', 76', 83'	Report	Reis 21' (o.g.); Possignolo 90+2'	Stadium: Estádio José Alvalade; Attendance: 21,038; Referee: António Nobre

7 January 2022 17	Santa Clara	3–2	Sporting CP	Ponta Delgada
18:30 WET (UTC±0)	Patric 30'; Lincoln 51'; Ricardinho 78'	Report	Palhinha 10'; Sarabia 50'	Stadium: Estádio de São Miguel; Attendance: 1,761; Referee: Rui Costa

16 January 2022 18	Vizela	0–2	Sporting CP	Vizela
18:00 WET (UTC±0)		Report	Gonçalves 28'; Bragança 42'	Stadium: Estádio do FC Vizela; Attendance: 3,800; Referee: Fábio Veríssimo

22 January 2022 19	Sporting CP	1–2	Braga	Lisbon
20:30 WET (UTC±0)	Gonçalves 24'	Report	Galeno 52' (pen.); Gorby 90+7'	Stadium: Estádio José Alvalade; Attendance: 26,989; Referee: Hugo Miguel

2 February 2022 20	Belenenses SAD	1–4	Sporting CP	Oeiras
20:45 WET (UTC±0)	Camará 21'	Report	Paulinho 11', 47'; Porro 17'; Sarabia 45+2'	Stadium: Estádio Nacional; Attendance: 4,463; Referee: Gustavo Correia

6 February 2022 21	Sporting CP	2–0	Famalicão	Lisbon
20:30 WET (UTC±0)	Sarabia 6' (pen.); Reis 63'	Report		Stadium: Estádio José Alvalade; Attendance: 25,640; Referee: André Narciso

11 February 2022 22	Porto	2–2	Sporting CP	Porto
20:15 WET (UTC±0)	Vieira 38'; Taremi 78'	Report	Paulinho 8'; Santos 34'	Stadium: Estádio do Dragão; Attendance: 48,350; Referee: João Pinheiro

20 February 2022 23	Sporting CP	3–0	Estoril	Lisbon
18:00 WET (UTC±0)	Gonçalves 40'; Reis 76'; Sarabia 81'	Report		Stadium: Estádio José Alvalade; Attendance: 35,270; Referee: Hélder Malheiro

26 February 2022 24	Marítimo	1–1	Sporting CP	Funchal
18:00 WET (UTC±0)	Xadas 5'	Report	Slimani 38'	Stadium: Estádio do Marítimo; Attendance: 6,221; Referee: Manuel Oliveira

5 March 2022 25	Sporting CP	2–0	Arouca	Lisbon
20:30 WET (UTC±0)	Slimani 46', 52'	Report		Stadium: Estádio José Alvalade; Attendance: 25,254; Referee: António Nobre

14 March 2022 26	Moreirense	0–2	Sporting CP	Moreira de Cónegos
20:15 WET (UTC±0)		Report	Slimani 29'; Paulinho 39'	Stadium: Parque Joaquim de Almeida Freitas; Attendance: 2,821; Referee: João Pinheiro

19 March 2022 27	Vitória de Guimarães	1–3	Sporting CP	Guimarães
20:30 WET (UTC±0)	Estupiñán 23'	Report	Sarabia 45+1' (pen.); Paulinho 70'; Edwards 90+8'	Stadium: Estádio D. Afonso Henriques; Attendance: 16,122; Referee: Fábio Veríssimo

3 April 2022 28	Sporting CP	2–0	Paços de Ferreira	Lisbon
20:30 WEST (UTC+1)	Sarabia 20' (pen.); Santos 72'	Report		Stadium: Estádio José Alvalade; Attendance: 28,788; Referee: Vítor Ferreira

9 April 2022 29	Tondela	1–3	Sporting CP	Tondela
20:30 WEST (UTC+1)	Hernando 71'	Report	Inácio 29'; Sarabia 33', 69' (pen.)	Stadium: Estádio João Cardoso; Attendance: 4,745; Referee: Luís Godinho

17 April 2022 30	Sporting CP	0–2	Benfica	Lisbon
20:30 WEST (UTC+1)		Report	Núñez 14'; Dias 90+3'	Stadium: Estádio José Alvalade; Attendance: 40,714; Referee: Fábio Veríssimo

25 April 2022 31	Boavista	0–3	Sporting CP	Porto
20:30 WEST (UTC+1)		Report	Nunes 37'; Abascal 58' (o.g.); Tabata 83' (pen.)	Stadium: Estádio do Bessa; Attendance: 7,434; Referee: Manuel Mota

1 May 2022 32	Sporting CP	4–1	Gil Vicente	Lisbon
20:30 WEST (UTC+1)	Sarabia 21' (pen.); Edwards 38'; Cunha 53' (o.g.); Gonçalves 63' (pen.)	Report	Navarro 45+4'	Stadium: Estádio José Alvalade; Attendance: 25,425; Referee: Miguel Nogueira

7 May 2022 33	Portimonense	2–3	Sporting CP	Portimão
20:30 WEST (UTC+1)	Carlinhos 25'; Welinton Júnior 30'	Report	Tabata 12'; Sarabia 71', 76'	Stadium: Estádio Municipal de Portimão; Attendance: 3,903; Referee: Rui Costa

14 May 2022 34	Sporting CP	4–0	Santa Clara	Lisbon
20:30 WEST (UTC+1)	Tabata 41'; Porro 51'; Sarabia 56'; Edwards 78'	Report		Stadium: Estádio José Alvalade; Referee: Hugo Miguel

=== Taça de Portugal ===
15 October 2021 Third round	Belenenses	0–4	Sporting CP	Belém
20:45 WEST (UTC+1)		Report	Tomás 2', 70'; Cabral 76' (pen.); Santos 79' (pen.)	Stadium: Estádio do Restelo; Referee: Gustavo Correia

18 November 2021 Fourth round	Sporting CP	2–1	Varzim	Lisbon
20:15 WET (UTC±0)	Gonçalves 67', 88' (pen.)	Report	Heliardo 78' (pen.)	Stadium: Estádio José Alvalade; Referee: André Narciso

22 December 2021 Fifth round	Casa Pia	1–2	Sporting CP	Lisbon
20:45 WET (UTC+0)	Jota 8'	Report	Coates 32'; Sarabia 57'	Stadium: Estádio Pina Manique; Referee: Rui Costa

11 January 2022 Quarter-finals	Leça	0–4	Sporting CP	Leça da Palmeira
20:45 WET (UTC+0)		Report	Tabata 12', 80'; Nunes 31'; Santos 90+2'	Stadium: Estádio do Leça FC; Referee: Manuel Mota

2 March 2022 Semi-finals; First leg	Sporting CP	1–2	Porto	Lisbon
20:45 WET (UTC+0)	Sarabia 49'	Report	Taremi 59' (pen.); Evanilson 64'	Stadium: Estádio José Alvalade; Attendance: 44,231; Referee: Artur Soares Dias

21 April 2022 Semi-finals; Second leg	Porto	1–0 (3–1 agg.)	Sporting CP	Porto
20:15 WEST (UTC+1)	Martínez 83'	Report		Stadium: Estádio do Dragão; Referee: Nuno Almeida

=== Taça da Liga ===
==== Third round ====
Pos	Team	Pld	W	D	L	GF	GA	GD	Pts	Qualification	SPO	FAM	PEN
1	Sporting CP	2	2	0	0	3	1	+2	6	Advance to knockout phase	—	2–1	—
2	Famalicão	2	1	0	1	6	2	+4	3		—	—	5–0
3	Penafiel	2	0	0	2	0	6	−6	0		0–1	—	—

Updated to match(es) played on unknown. Source: Liga Portugal
Rules for classification: Tiebreakers

26 October 2021 2	Sporting CP	2–1	Famalicão	Lisbon
21:15 WEST (UTC+1)	Ugarte 8'; Santos 61'	Report	Heriberto Tavares 90'	Stadium: Estádio José Alvalade; Attendance: 14,755; Referee: Manuel Mota

14 December 2021 3	Penafiel	0–1	Sporting CP	Penafiel
20:15 WET (UTC±0)		Report	Tomás 16'	Stadium: Estádio Municipal 25 de Abril; Attendance: 2,012; Referee: Claúdio Pereira

==== Semi-finals ====
26 January 2022	Sporting CP	2–1	Santa Clara	Leiria
19:45 WET (UTC±0)	Villanueva 16' (o.g.); Sarabia 65' (pen.)	Report	Lincoln 32'	Stadium: Estádio Municipal de Leiria; Attendance: 7,337; Referee: António Nobre

==== Final ====
29 January 2022	Benfica	1–2	Sporting CP	Leiria
19:45 WET (UTC±0)	Everton 23'	Report	Inácio 49'; Sarabia 78'	Stadium: Estádio Municipal de Leiria; Attendance: 20,622; Referee: Manuel Mota

=== Supertaça Cândido de Oliveira ===
31 July 2021 Final	Sporting CP	2–1	Braga	Aveiro
20:45 WEST (UTC+1)	Palhinha (yellow card) 17'; Cabral 29'; Gonçalves 43', (yellow card) 44'; Nunes (yellow card) 49'	Report	Fransérgio 20', (yellow card) 45+2'; Tormena (yellow card) 62'; Sequeira (yellow card) 87'; Novais (yellow card) 90+1'	Stadium: Estádio Municipal de Aveiro; Attendance: 7,710; Referee: João Pinheiro

=== UEFA Champions League ===
==== Group stage ====
The draw for the group stage was held on 26 August 2021.

Pos	Team	Pld	W	D	L	GF	GA	GD	Pts	Qualification	AJX	SPO	DOR	BES
1	(Netherlands) Ajax	6	6	0	0	20	5	+15	18	Advance to knockout phase	—	4–2	4–0	2–0
2	(Portugal) Sporting CP	6	3	0	3	14	12	+2	9 (Note: Tied on head-to-head points. Head-to-head goal difference: Sporting CP +1, Borussia Dortmund −1.)	Advance to knockout phase	1–5	—	3–1	4–0
3	(Germany) Borussia Dortmund	6	3	0	3	10	11	−1	9	Transfer to Europa League	1–3	1–0	—	5–0
4	(Turkey) Beşiktaş	6	0	0	6	3	19	−16	0		1–2	1–4	1–2	—

Source: UEFA
Rules for classification: Group stage tiebreakers
Notes:

15 September 2021 1	Sporting CP (Portugal)	1–5	(Netherlands) Ajax	Lisbon, Portugal
20:00 WEST (UTC+1)	Paulinho 33'; Palhinha (yellow card) 41'; Tomás (yellow card) 83'; Feddal (yellow card) 84'	Report	Haller 2', 9', 51', 63'; Berghuis 39'; Timber (yellow card) 45+1'; Álvarez (yellow card) 49'; Martínez (yellow card) 86'	Stadium: Estádio José Alvalade; Attendance: 20,382; Referee: José María Sánchez Martínez (Spain)

28 September 2021 2	Borussia Dortmund (Germany)	1–0	(Portugal) Sporting CP	Dortmund, Germany
21:00 CEST (UTC+2)	Malen 37'; Bellingham (yellow card) 42'; Hummels (yellow card) 59'	Report	Nunes (yellow card) 42'; Neto (yellow card) 90'	Stadium: Westfalenstadion; Attendance: 25,000; Referee: Srđan Jovanović (Serbia)

19 October 2021 3	Beşiktaş (Turkey)	1–4	(Portugal) Sporting CP	Istanbul, Turkey
18:45 CET (UTC+1)	Larin 24'; Vida (yellow card) 43'; Teixeira (yellow card) 47'; Ghezzal (yellow card) 58'; Pjanić (yellow card) 90+3'	Report	Coates 15', 27'; Porro (yellow card) 25'; Sarabia 44' (pen.); Inácio (yellow card) 72'; Feddal (yellow card) 76'; Paulinho 89'	Stadium: Vodafone Park; Attendance: 22,936; Referee: Slavko Vinčić (Slovenia)

3 November 2021 4	Sporting CP (Portugal)	4–0	(Turkey) Beşiktaş	Lisbon, Portugal
20:00 WET (UTC±0)	Gonçalves 31' (pen.), 38'; Paulinho 41'; Sarabia 56'	Report	De Souza (yellow card) 50' (yellow-red card) 90'; Larin (yellow card) 50'	Stadium: Estádio José Alvalade; Attendance: 40,835; Referee: Sergei Karasev (Russia)

24 November 2021 5	Sporting CP (Portugal)	3–1	(Germany) Borussia Dortmund	Lisbon, Portugal
20:00 WET (UTC±0)	Gonçalves 30', 39', (penalty missed) 81'; Palhinha (yellow card) 55'; Coates (yellow card) 57'; Paulinho (yellow card) 74'; Nunes (yellow card) 74'; Porro (yellow card) 74', (goal) 81'; Adán (yellow card) 90+8'	Report	Reus (yellow card) 74'; Zagadou (yellow card) 74'; Can (red card) 74'; Malen 90+3'	Stadium: Estádio José Alvalade; Attendance: 41,341; Referee: Carlos del Cerro Grande (Spain)

7 December 2021 6	Ajax (Netherlands)	4–2	(Portugal) Sporting CP	Amsterdam, Netherlands
21:00 CET (UTC+1)	Haller 8' (pen.); Antony 42'; Schuurs (yellow card) 44'; Álvarez (yellow card) 54'; Neres 58'; Berghuis 62'	Report	Bragança (yellow card) 7'; Santos 22'; Tabata (yellow card) 35', (goal) 78'	Stadium: Johan Cruyff Arena; Attendance: 0 Referee: Davide Massa (Italy)

==== Knockout phase ====
===== Round of 16 =====
The draw for the round of 16 was held on 13 December 2021.

15 February 2022 First leg	Sporting CP (Portugal)	0–5	(England) Manchester City	Lisbon, Portugal
21:00 CET (UTC+1)	Nunes (yellow card) 65'; Esgaio (yellow card) 78'; Ugarte (yellow card) 83'	Report	Mahrez 7'; Silva 17', 44'; Foden 32'; Sterling 58'; Gündoğan (yellow card) 74'	Stadium: Estádio José Alvalade; Attendance: 48,129; Referee: Srđan Jovanović (Serbia)

9 March 2022 Second leg	Manchester City (England)	0–0 (5–0 agg.)	(Portugal) Sporting CP	Manchester, England
20:00 GMT (UTC+0)	Gabriel Jesus (yellow card) 39'	Report	Paulinho (yellow card) 15'; Slimani (yellow card) 40'	Stadium: City of Manchester Stadium; Attendance: 51,213; Referee: Halil Umut Meler (Turkey)

== Statistics ==
=== Appearances and goals ===
No.	Pos	Nat	Player	Total		Primeira Liga		Taça de Portugal		Taça da Liga		Supertaça Cândido de Oliveira		UEFA Champions League	
No.	Pos	Nat	Player	Apps	Goals	Apps	Goals	Apps	Goals	Apps	Goals	Apps	Goals	Apps	Goals
Goalkeepers
1	GK	(Spain) ESP	Antonio Adán	45	0	33	0	2	0	2	0	1	0	7	0
22	GK	(Portugal) POR	André Paulo	1	0	0+1	0	0	0	0	0	0	0	0	0
31	GK	(Portugal) POR	João Virgínia	8	0	1	0	4	0	2	0	0	0	1	0
40	GK	(Brazil) BRA	Renan Ribeiro	0	0	0	0	0	0	0	0	0	0	0	0
Defenders
2	DF	(Brazil) BRA	Matheus Reis	44	2	23+3	2	4+1	0	3+1	0	0+1	0	7+1	0
3	DF	(Morocco) MAR	Zouhair Feddal	27	0	13+1	0	3	0	2	0	1	0	5+2	0
4	DF	(Uruguay) URU	Sebastián Coates	41	5	30	2	3	1	1	0	1	0	6	2
13	DF	(Portugal) POR	Luís Neto	32	0	16+5	0	3+1	0	4	0	0	0	2+1	0
16	DF	(Portugal) POR	Rúben Vinagre	18	0	7+5	0	2	0	1+1	0	0	0	1+1	0
24	DF	(Spain) ESP	Pedro Porro	35	5	19+4	4	2+2	0	0+1	0	0	0	7	1
25	DF	(Portugal) POR	Gonçalo Inácio	45	5	28	4	5	0	3+1	1	1	0	7	0
47	DF	(Portugal) POR	Ricardo Esgaio	44	0	15+12	0	4+1	0	3	0	1	0	2+6	0
63	DF	(Spain) ESP	José Marsà	1	0	0+1	0	0	0	0	0	0	0	0	0
71	DF	(Portugal) POR	Flávio Nazinho	5	0	1+1	0	1	0	0	0	0	0	0+2	0
87	DF	(Portugal) POR	Gonçalo Esteves	10	0	1+3	0	2+1	0	1+1	0	0	0	1	0
Midfielders
6	MF	(Portugal) POR	João Palhinha	39	3	23+4	3	1+1	0	2+1	0	1	0	6	0
8	MF	(Portugal) POR	Matheus Nunes	50	4	31+2	3	4+2	1	2+2	0	1	0	6	0
15	MF	(Uruguay) URU	Manuel Ugarte	38	1	10+15	0	4+1	0	3+1	1	0	0	2+2	0
17	MF	(Spain) ESP	Pablo Sarabia	45	21	26+3	15	3+1	2	4	2	0	0	6+2	2
23	MF	(England) ENG	Marcus Edwards	15	3	5+7	3	0+2	0	0	0	0	0	0+1	0
28	MF	(Portugal) POR	Pedro Gonçalves	41	15	25+2	8	3+1	2	2+2	0	1	1	4+1	4
68	MF	(Portugal) POR	Daniel Bragança	36	2	5+21	2	3+1	0	1	0	0	0	1+4	0
84	MF	(Portugal) POR	Dário Essugo	2	0	1	0	0	0	0	0	0	0	0+1	0
91	MF	(Portugal) POR	Rodrigo Ribeiro	5	0	0+4	0	0	0	0	0	0	0	0+1	0
Forwards
7	FW	(Brazil) BRA	Bruno Tabata	41	6	21+9	3	3	2	2+1	0	0+1	0	2+2	1
9	FW	(Algeria) ALG	Islam Slimani	12	4	4+5	4	0+1	0	0	0	0	0	1+1	0
11	FW	(Portugal) POR	Nuno Santos	50	10	23+9	6	3+3	2	3+1	1	0+1	0	2+5	1
21	FW	(Portugal) POR	Paulinho	46	14	27+2	11	3+2	0	1+2	0	1	0	7+1	3
Players who departed during the season
5	DF	(Portugal) POR	Nuno Mendes	3	0	1+1	0	0	0	0	0	1	0	0	0
34	DF	(Portugal) POR	João Goulart	1	0	0	0	0+1	0	0	0	0	0	0	0
57	DF	(Mozambique) MOZ	Geny Catamo	1	0	0+1	0	0	0	0	0	0	0	0	0
10	FW	(Cape Verde) CPV	Jovane Cabral	17	3	4+6	1	2	1	1	0	1	1	1+2	0
19	FW	(Portugal) POR	Tiago Tomás	24	3	0+13	0	2	2	1+2	1	0+1	0	2+3	0

- Source: soccerway
