= Fazendas de Almeirim =

- Civil parish
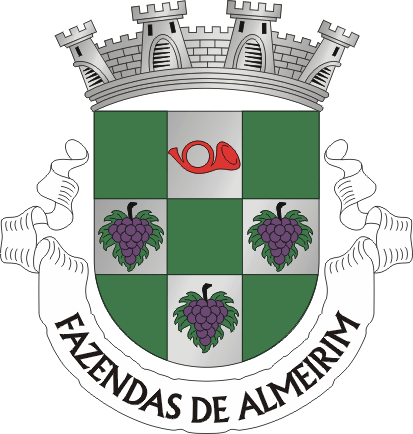
- Coat of arms

- Location in Portugal
- Coordinates: 39.18°N 8.58°W
- Country: Portugal
- Region: Oeste e Vale do Tejo
- Intermunic. comm.: Lezíria do Tejo
- District: Santarém
- Municipality: Almeirim

Area
  - Total: 58.3 km^{2} (22.5 sq mi)

Population (2011)
  - Total: 6,949
- Time zone: UTC+00:00 (WET)
  - Summer (DST): UTC+01:00 (WEST)

Fazendas de Almeirim is a town and a civil parish in the municipality of Almeirim, Portugal.

== Notable people ==
Daniel Bragança - footballer for Primeira Liga club Sporting CP
