= Jovane Cabral =

Cape Verdean footballer (born 1998)

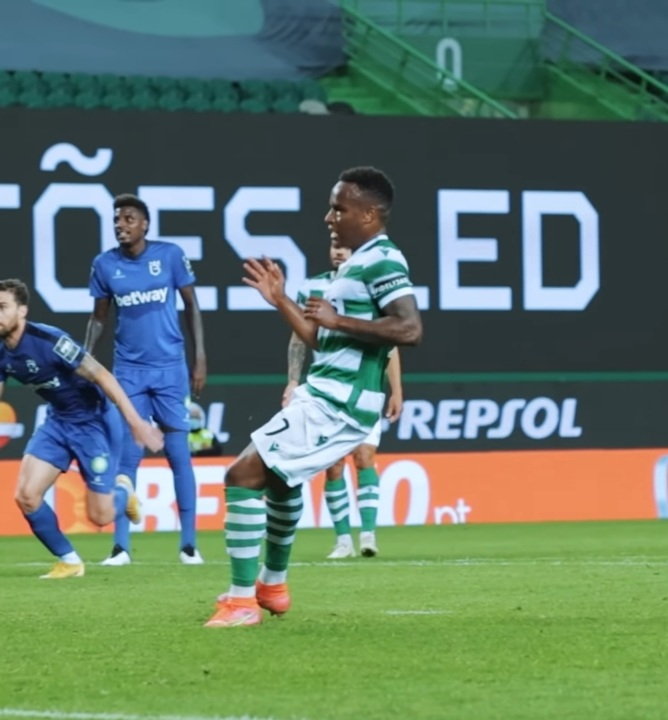
- Cabral with Sporting CP in 2021

Personal information
- Full name: Jovane Eduardo Borges Cabral
- Date of birth: 14 June 1998 (age 28)
- Place of birth: Assomada, Cape Verde
- Height: 1.74 m (5 ft 9 in)
- Position: Winger

Team information
- Current team: Grêmio
- Number: 77

Youth career
- 2008–2014: Grémio Nhagar
- 2014–2016: Sporting CP

Senior career*
Years	Team	Apps	(Gls)
2016–2018	Sporting CP B	34	(2)
2018–2024	Sporting CP	72	(14)
2022	→ Lazio (loan)	3	(1)
2023–2024	→ Salernitana (loan)	12	(1)
2024	→ Olympiacos (loan)	4	(0)
2024–2026	Estrela Amadora	53	(9)
2026–	Grêmio	6	(1)

International career^{‡}
2017–	Cape Verde	33	(3)
Medal record
Men's football
Representing Cape Verde
FIFA Series
Winner	2024 Saudi Arabia A
- * Club domestic league appearances and goals as of 19:05, 19 September 2026 (UTC) ‡ National team caps and goals as of 20:13, 29 September 2026 (UTC)

Jovane Eduardo Borges Cabral (Portuguese: [ʒɔ.ˈvɐ.nɨ e.du.ˈaɾ.du ˈbɔɾ.ʒɨʃ kɐ.ˈbɾal]; born 14 June 1998) is a Cape Verdean professional footballer who plays as a winger for Campeonato Brasileiro Série A club Grêmio and the Cape Verde national team.

== Club career ==
=== Sporting CP ===
Born in Assomada, Sotavento Islands, Cabral joined Sporting CP's youth academy at the age of 16 from Grémio Nhagar. On 20 August 2016 he made his senior debut with the reserve side, coming on as a 61st-minute substitute in a 2–4 home loss against Fafe in the LigaPro. His first goal in the competition came on 19 March 2017, netting through a free kick in a 2–1 away victory over Leixões. Still that year, he helped the juniors win the national championship.

Cabral was called by first-team manager Jorge Jesus for the 2017 pre-season, but eventually returned to the B team. He made his competitive debut for the former on 12 October, replacing Mattheus Oliveira for the final 12 minutes of the 4–2 victory at Oleiros in the third round of the Taça de Portugal.

Cabral scored his first official goal for Sporting on 1 September 2018, his 88th-minute strike earning the hosts a 1–0 Primeira Liga home win against Feirense. On 3 December, in what was new manager Marcel Keizer's first match in charge, he netted through a 20-meter curl to close the score in a 3–1 defeat of Rio Ave at the Estádio dos Arcos; the goal was later named as the best of the season at the annual awards ceremony.

In June 2020, after the season resumed following the COVID-19 shutdown, Cabral scored four goals over three consecutive games. This concluded with two in a 3–1 win at B-SAD on 26 June, when he was replaced injured at half-time; he was named the league's Player of the Month.

On 19 January 2021, after having replaced fellow youth graduate Tiago Tomás late into the second half, Cabral scored twice to help his team come from behind and beat Porto 2–1 in the semi-finals of the Taça da Liga. One year later, he was loaned to Italian Serie A club Lazio with an option to buy. He made his debut for the latter on 17 February, playing ten minutes in the 2–1 away loss against Porto in the knockout play-offs of the UEFA Europa League. He totalled four games for the Romans, scoring in a 3–3 home draw with Hellas Verona on 21 May in the last fixture of the campaign.

Cabral was supposed to join Real Valladolid on loan in the January 2023 transfer window, but the deal fell through due to bureaucratic reasons. On 24 August, also on loan, he signed for one season with Italian top-flight Salernitana, with a buying option reported to be around €3.5 million.

On 1 February 2024, Cabral's loan was cancelled. Hours later, Sporting loaned him to Super League Greece club Olympiacos until the end of the campaign, with a reported €3 million buying option.

=== Estrela Amadora ===
Cabral signed a two-year contract with Estrela da Amadora on 2 September 2024, for €800,000 and 90% of his sporting rights. In July 2026, having scored nine league goals as his team consecutively managed to remain in the top tier, he left.

=== Grêmio ===
On 12 July 2026, Cabral joined Campeonato Brasileiro Série A side Grêmio on a two-year deal.

== International career ==
Cabral won his first cap for Cape Verde on 28 March 2017, in a 2–0 friendly win over Luxembourg. However, in October 2018 he announced he was applying for Portuguese nationality and that he intended to represent its national team.

On 23 March 2022, five years after his debut, Cabral scored his first goal, in the 2–0 friendly defeat of Guadeloupe in Orléans, France. He was selected by Bubista for the 2023 Africa Cup of Nations.

Cabral was named in Cape Verde's squad for the 2026 FIFA World Cup, the country's first-ever participation in the tournament. He made his first appearance in the competition on 15 June, starting the 0–0 draw against Spain in Atlanta.

== Career statistics ==
=== Club ===
As of match played 19 September 2026

Appearances and goals by club, season and competition
Club	Season	League			National cup (Note: Includes Taça de Portugal, Coppa Italia)		League cup (Note: Includes Taça da Liga)		Continental		Other		Total	
Club	Season	Division	Apps	Goals	Apps	Goals	Apps	Goals	Apps	Goals	Apps	Goals	Apps	Goals
Sporting CP B	2016–17	LigaPro	20	1	—		—		—		—		20	1
Sporting CP B	2017–18	LigaPro	14	1	—		—		—		—		14	1
Sporting CP B	Total		34	2	0	0	0	0	0	0	0	0	34	2
Sporting CP	2018–19	Primeira Liga	18	2	3	0	2	0	7 (Note: Appearances in UEFA Europa League)	2	—		30	4
Sporting CP	2019–20	Primeira Liga	16	6	0	0	1	0	3	0	0	0	20	6
Sporting CP	2020–21	Primeira Liga	24	5	1	1	2	2	1	0	—		28	8
Sporting CP	2021–22	Primeira Liga	10	1	2	1	1	0	3 (Note: Appearances in UEFA Champions League)	0	1 (Note: Appearance in Supertaça Cândido de Oliveira)	1	17	3
Sporting CP	2022–23	Primeira Liga	4	0	1	0	4	0	1	0	—		10	0
Sporting CP	Total		72	14	7	2	10	2	15	2	1	1	105	21
Lazio (loan)	2021–22	Serie A	3	1	0	0	—		1	0	—		4	1
Salernitana (loan)	2023–24	Serie A	12	1	1	1	—		—		—		13	2
Olympiacos (loan)	2023–24	Super League Greece	4	0	—		—		0	0	—		4	0
Estrela Amadora	2024–25	Primeira Liga	26	2	0	0	—		—		—		26	2
Estrela Amadora	2025–26	Primeira Liga	27	7	0	0	—		—		—		27	7
Estrela Amadora	Total		53	9	0	0	—		—		—		53	9
Grêmio	2026	Série A	6	1	3	0	—		0	0	—		9	1
Career total			184	28	11	3	10	2	16	2	1	1	222	36

=== International ===
As of match played 29 September 2026

Appearances and goals by national team and year
National team	Year	Apps	Goals
Cape Verde	2017	1	0
Cape Verde	2022	4	1
Cape Verde	2023	1	0
Cape Verde	2024	12	1
Cape Verde	2025	7	1
Cape Verde	2026	8	0
Total		33	3

Scores and results list Cape Verde's goal tally first, score column indicates score after each Cabral goal.

List of international goals scored by Jovane Cabral
No.	Date	Venue	Opponent	Score	Result	Competition
1	23 March 2022	Stade de la Source, Orléans, France	Guadeloupe	1–0	2–0	Friendly
2	26 March 2024	Prince Abdullah Al-Faisal Sports City, Jeddah, Saudi Arabia	Equatorial Guinea	1–0	1–0	Friendly
3	4 September 2025	Côte d'Or National Sports Complex, Saint Pierre, Mauritius	Mauritius	1–0	2–0	2026 FIFA World Cup qualification

== Honours ==
Sporting CP

- Primeira Liga: 2020–21
- Taça de Portugal: 2018–19
- Taça da Liga: 2018–19, 2020–21, 2021–22
- Supertaça Cândido de Oliveira: 2021

Individual

- Primeira Liga Goal of the Season: 2018–19
