= Daniel Bragança =

Portuguese footballer (born 1999)

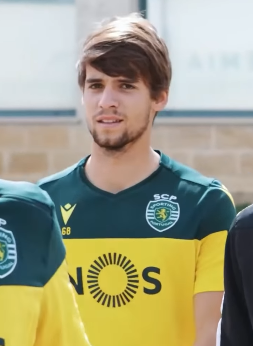
- Bragança with Sporting CP in 2021

Personal information
- Full name: Daniel Santos Bragança
- Date of birth: 27 May 1999 (age 27)
- Place of birth: Fazendas de Almeirim, Portugal
- Height: 1.78 m (5 ft 10 in)
- Position: Midfielder

Team information
- Current team: Torino (on loan from Sporting CP)
- Number: 21

Youth career
- 2007–2018: Sporting CP

Senior career*
| Years | Team | Apps | (Gls) |
| 2018– | Sporting CP | 107 | (14) |
| 2019 | → Farense (loan) | 16 | (2) |
| 2019–2020 | → Estoril (loan) | 20 | (4) |
| 2026 | Sporting CP B | 1 | (0) |
| 2026– | → Torino (loan) | 10 | (1) |

International career
| 2017 | Portugal U18 | 2 | (1) |
| 2018 | Portugal U20 | 2 | (1) |
| 2019–2021 | Portugal U21 | 13 | (0) |
Medal record
Men's football
Representing Portugal
UEFA European Under-21 Championship
| Runner-up | 2021 |
- * Club domestic league appearances and goals as of 22:13, 22 November 2026 (UTC)

Daniel Santos Bragança (born 27 May 1999) is a Portuguese professional footballer who plays as a midfielder for Serie A club Torino, on loan from Primeira Liga club Sporting CP.

== Club career ==
Born in Fazendas de Almeirim, Santarém District, Bragança spent his entire youth career with Sporting CP. On 10 January 2019, he was loaned to LigaPro club Farense until the end of the season. He scored his first goal on 14 April to open a 3–1 home win against Estoril, and followed it five days later with another in a 1–1 draw with Penafiel also at the Estádio de São Luís.

Bragança was loaned again to a second-tier side on 9 August 2019, this time Estoril. He was sent off on 3 November for pulling the hair of Académico de Viseu's Kelvin Medina, and received a two-match ban.

Bragança made his competitive debut on 24 September 2020 in the third qualifying round of the UEFA Europa League at home to Aberdeen, as an 86th-minute substitute for Wendel in a 1–0 victory. Three days later, he appeared in his first Primeira Liga game, a 2–0 away defeat of Paços de Ferreira where he featured 25 minutes in place of Luciano Vietto. He finished the campaign with 25 official appearances – 21 in the league – for the champions, and was given an improved salary at its closure.

On 18 December 2021, Bragança scored his first goal for the club, closing the 3–0 away defeat of Gil Vicente. He missed the entire 2022–23 due to an anterior cruciate ligament injury.

Bragança marked his 100th Sporting appearance on 6 April 2024, in the 2–1 home win over Benfica in the Lisbon derby; he played 42 minutes in place of Hidemasa Morita.

On 15 February 2025, early into the league fixture against Arouca, Bragança again injured the ACL of his knee (left one this time), going on to be sidelined for nearly one year. He returned to action the following 4 January, featuring 28 minutes for Sporting's reserves in a 1–2 second-division loss to Académico Viseu. Two weeks later, on his first appearance for the main squad since his comeback, he scored to close the 3–0 league victory over Casa Pia.

On 1 September 2026, shortly after renewing his contract, Bragança was loaned to Torino of Serie A with an obligation to buy. He scored his first goal on 12 October, in a 2–1 home defeat of Udinese.

== International career ==
On 5 September 2019, Bragança won his first cap for the Portugal under-21 team, playing the entire 4–0 win against Gibraltar for the 2021 UEFA European Championship qualifiers. Selected for the finals in Hungary and Slovenia, he played all six games for the runners-up, starting in four.

== Career statistics ==
As of match played 21 November 2026

Appearances and goals by club, season and competition
| Club | Season | League | | | Taça de Portugal | | Taça da Liga | | Europe | | Other | | Total | |
| Club | Season | Division | Apps | Goals | Apps | Goals | Apps | Goals | Apps | Goals | Apps | Goals | Apps | Goals |
|---|---|---|---|---|---|---|---|---|---|---|---|---|---|---|
| Farense (loan) | 2018–19 | Liga Portugal 2 | 16 | 2 | — | | — | | — | | — | | 16 | 2 |
| Estoril (loan) | 2019–20 | Liga Portugal 2 | 20 | 4 | 2 | 0 | — | | — | | — | | 22 | 4 |
| Sporting CP | 2020–21 | Primeira Liga | 21 | 0 | 1 | 0 | 2 | 0 | 1 (Note: Appearances in UEFA Europa League) | 0 | 0 | 0 | 25 | 0 |
| Sporting CP | 2021–22 | Primeira Liga | 26 | 2 | 4 | 0 | 1 | 0 | 5 (Note: Appearances in UEFA Champions League) | 0 | 0 | 0 | 36 | 2 |
| Sporting CP | 2023–24 | Primeira Liga | 28 | 3 | 7 | 1 | 3 | 1 | 9 | 0 | — | | 47 | 5 |
| Sporting CP | 2024–25 | Primeira Liga | 18 | 3 | 2 | 0 | 0 | 0 | 8 | 1 | 1 (Note: Appearance in Supertaça Cândido de Oliveira) | 0 | 29 | 4 |
| Sporting CP | 2025–26 | Primeira Liga | 14 | 6 | 4 | 0 | 0 | 0 | 0 | 0 | 0 | 24 | 6 | |
| Sporting CP | Total | | 107 | 14 | 18 | 1 | 6 | 1 | 29 | 1 | 1 | 0 | 161 | 17 |
| Sporting CP B | 2025–26 | Liga Portugal 2 | 1 | 0 | — | | — | | — | | — | | 1 | 0 |
| Torino (loan) | 2026–27 | Serie A | 10 | 1 | 0 | 0 | — | | — | | — | | 10 | 1 |
| Career total | | | 154 | 21 | 20 | 1 | 6 | 1 | 29 | 1 | 1 | 0 | 210 | 24 |

== Honours ==
Sporting CP

- Primeira Liga: 2020–21, 2023–24, 2024–25
- Taça de Portugal: 2024–25
- Taça da Liga: 2020–21, 2021–22
