= Tiago Tomás =

Portuguese footballer (born 2002)

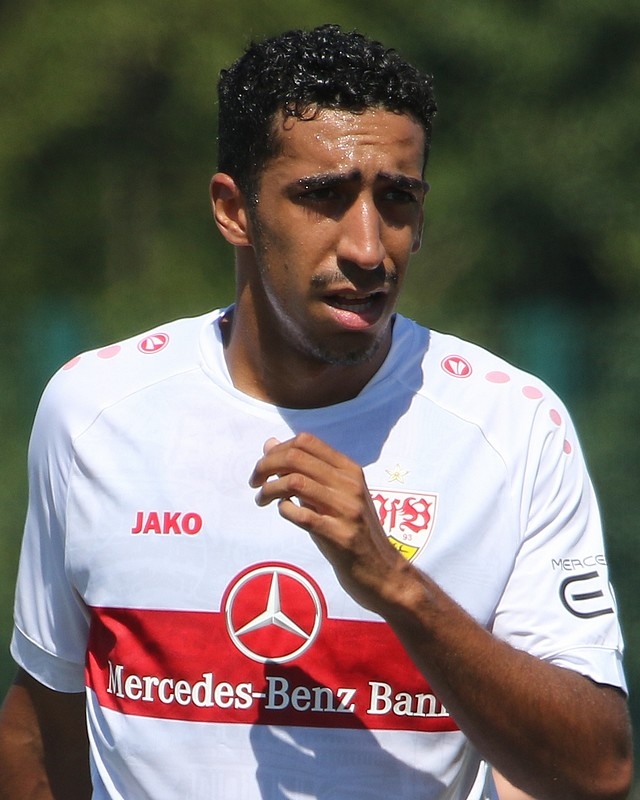
- Tómas with VfB Stuttgart in 2022

Personal information
- Full name: Tiago Barreiros de Melo Tomás
- Date of birth: 16 June 2002 (age 24)
- Place of birth: Cascais, Portugal
- Height: 1.80 m (5 ft 11 in)
- Position: Forward

Team information
- Current team: VfB Stuttgart
- Number: 8

Youth career
- 2010–2012: Carcavelos
- 2012–2013: Colégio Marista
- 2013–2014: Estoril
- 2014–2020: Sporting CP

Senior career*
| Years | Team | Apps | (Gls) |
| 2020–2023 | Sporting CP | 48 | (3) |
| 2022–2023 | → VfB Stuttgart (loan) | 41 | (7) |
| 2023–2025 | VfL Wolfsburg | 58 | (7) |
| 2025– | VfB Stuttgart | 29 | (5) |

International career
| 2018–2019 | Portugal U17 | 16 | (5) |
| 2019 | Portugal U18 | 4 | (5) |
| 2020 | Portugal U19 | 1 | (0) |
| 2021–2025 | Portugal U21 | 24 | (2) |
Medal record
Men's football
Representing Portugal
UEFA European Under-21 Championship
| Runner-up | 2021 |
- * Club domestic league appearances and goals as of 00:55, 8 November 2026 (UTC)

Tiago Barreiros de Melo Tomás (born 16 June 2002) is a Portuguese professional footballer who plays as a forward for Bundesliga club VfB Stuttgart.

== Club career ==
=== Sporting CP ===
Born in Cascais, Lisbon District of Angolan descent, Tomás came through the youth system of Sporting CP after a year at nearby Estoril. On 25 June 2020, he signed a five-year contract at the former club, with a buyout clause of €60 million.

Tomás made his professional debut on 1 July 2020 one month after his 18th birthday, as an 81st-minute substitute for Matheus Nunes in a 2–1 Primeira Liga win against Gil Vicente at home. He scored his first goal on 24 September, the only one of a home victory over Aberdeen in the third qualifying round of the UEFA Europa League. He contributed three goals from 30 appearances during the season, helping his team to conquer the league after 19 years.

=== VfB Stuttgart loan ===
On 30 January 2022, Tomás was loaned to VfB Stuttgart until June 2023 with a buying option. He played his first match in the Bundesliga six days later, replacing Chris Führich for the final ten minutes of the 3–2 home loss to Eintracht Frankfurt. He scored twice in his next appearance, but was unable to keep his team from a 4–2 defeat at Bayer Leverkusen.

In the 2022–23 campaign, Tomás helped the Mercedes-Benz Arena club to avoid relegation via the playoffs, with the player coming from the bench in both legs of the 6–1 aggregate win over Hamburger SV. On 16 June 2023, Stuttgart did not exercise its option and he left, thanking the organisation for "believing in me when no one else did".

=== VfL Wolfsburg ===
On 5 July 2023, Tomás signed a four-year contract with VfL Wolfsburg also of the German top division, for a fee of €8.8 million which could rise to €10.3 million with add-ons; Sporting were also entitled to 15% of any future transfer. He scored two of his three goals of his first season on 13 August, in the 6–0 away rout of amateurs Makkabi Berlin in the opening round of the DFB-Pokal.

Tomás scored six times in the following campaign, also providing two assists.

=== Return to Stuttgart ===
On 16 August 2025, Tomás returned to Stuttgart on a four-year deal. He scored in the first match upon returning, but in a 2–1 away loss against 1. FC Union Berlin; his was a late consolation goal after a Ilyas Ansah brace in the first half.

Tomás' father died in January 2026, when he was 23. On 19 February, he broke down in tears after closing the 4–1 victory at Celtic in the Europa League knockout phase play-offs; he had already shown emotion in the league match against 1. FC Köln five days before upon his return.

== International career ==
Aged 18, Tomás was selected by Portugal under-21 manager Rui Jorge for his 2021 UEFA European Championship squad. He earned his first cap in the first group stage match, starting a 1–0 win against Croatia in Koper.

Tomás scored his first goal on 7 October 2021, his team's tenth in the 11–0 demolition of Liechstenstein in Vizela for the 2023 European Championship qualifiers.

== Career statistics ==
As of match played 7 November 2026

Appearances and goals by club, season and competition
| Club | Season | League | | | National cup (Note: Includes Taça de Portugal, DFB-Pokal) | | League cup (Note: Includes Taça da Liga) | | Europe | | Other | | Total | |
| Club | Season | Division | Apps | Goals | Apps | Goals | Apps | Goals | Apps | Goals | Apps | Goals | Apps | Goals |
|---|---|---|---|---|---|---|---|---|---|---|---|---|---|---|
| Sporting CP | 2019–20 | Primeira Liga | 5 | 0 | 0 | 0 | 0 | 0 | — | | — | | 5 | 0 |
| Sporting CP | 2020–21 | Primeira Liga | 30 | 3 | 2 | 1 | 3 | 0 | 2 (Note: Appearances in UEFA Europa League) | 2 | — | | 37 | 6 |
| Sporting CP | 2021–22 | Primeira Liga | 13 | 0 | 2 | 2 | 3 | 1 | 5 (Note: Appearances in UEFA Champions League) | 0 | 1 (Note: Appearance in Supertaça Cândido de Oliveira) | 0 | 24 | 3 |
| Sporting CP | Total | | 48 | 3 | 4 | 3 | 6 | 1 | 7 | 2 | 1 | 0 | 66 | 9 |
| VfB Stuttgart (loan) | 2021–22 | Bundesliga | 14 | 4 | — | | — | | — | | — | | 14 | 4 |
| VfB Stuttgart (loan) | 2022–23 | Bundesliga | 27 | 3 | 4 | 1 | — | | — | | 2 (Note: Appearances in Bundesliga relegation play-offs) | 0 | 33 | 4 |
| VfB Stuttgart (loan) | Total | | 41 | 7 | 4 | 1 | — | | — | | — | | 47 | 8 |
| VfL Wolfsburg | 2023–24 | Bundesliga | 26 | 1 | 3 | 2 | — | | — | | — | | 29 | 3 |
| VfL Wolfsburg | 2024–25 | Bundesliga | 32 | 6 | 4 | 0 | — | | — | | — | | 36 | 6 |
| VfL Wolfsburg | Total | | 58 | 7 | 7 | 2 | — | | — | | — | | 65 | 9 |
| VfB Stuttgart | 2025–26 | Bundesliga | 27 | 5 | 3 | 1 | — | | 9 | 2 | — | | 39 | 8 |
| VfB Stuttgart | 2026–27 | Bundesliga | 2 | 0 | 1 | 1 | — | | 1 | 0 | — | | 4 | 1 |
| VfB Stuttgart | Total | | 29 | 5 | 4 | 2 | — | | 10 | 2 | — | | 43 | 9 |
| Career total | | | 176 | 22 | 19 | 8 | 6 | 1 | 17 | 4 | 3 | 0 | 221 | 35 |

== Honours ==
Sporting CP

- Primeira Liga: 2020–21
- Taça da Liga: 2020–21, 2021–22
- Supertaça Cândido de Oliveira: 2021
