= Zouhair Feddal =

Moroccan footballer (born 1989)

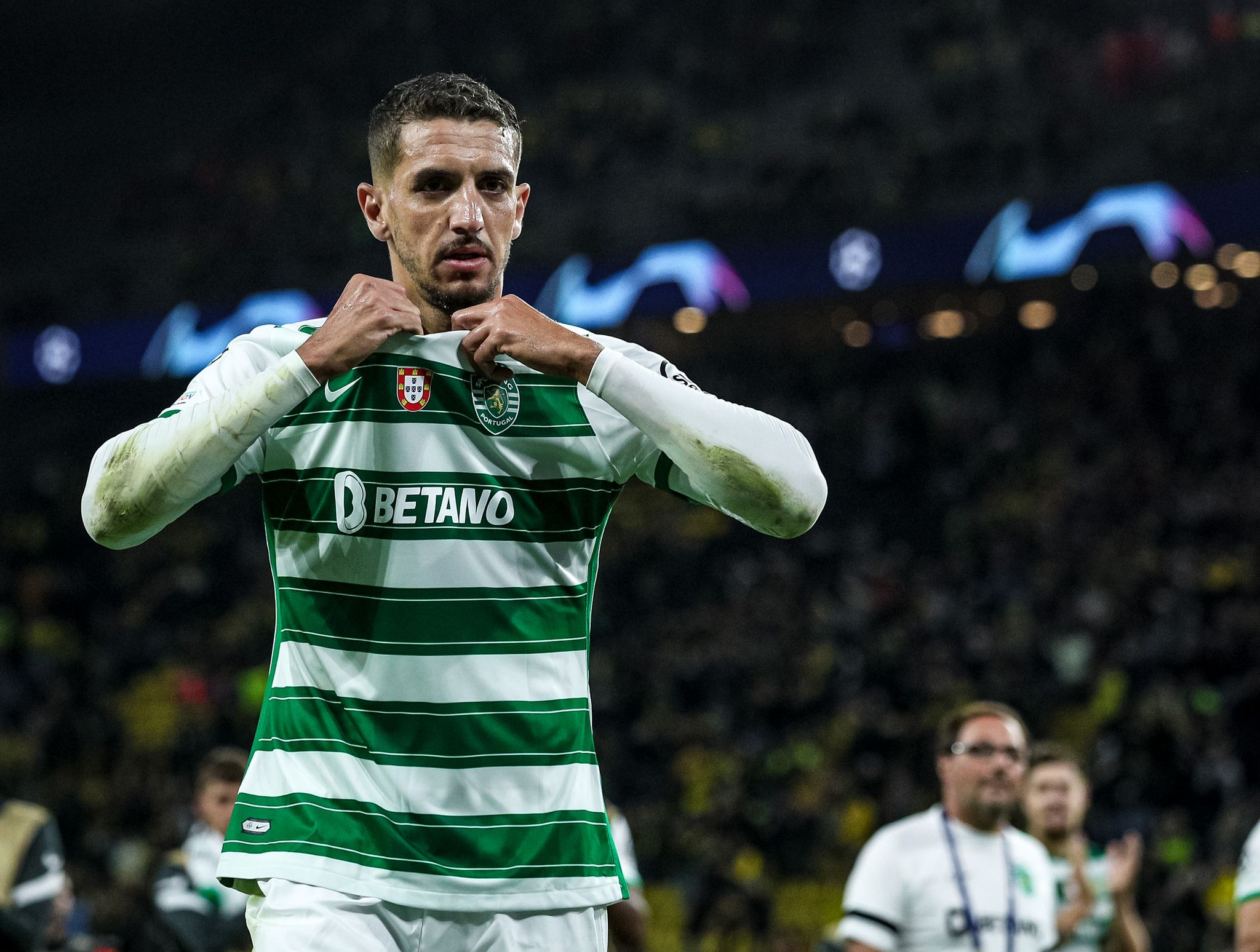
- Feddal with Sporting CP

Personal information
- Full name: Zouhair Feddal Agharbi
- Date of birth: 23 December 1989 (age 36)
- Place of birth: Tétouan, Morocco
- Height: 1.92 m (6 ft 4 in)
- Position: Defender

Youth career
- Moghreb Tétouan
- Vilamalla
- Peralada
- 2006–2007: Monaco
- 2007–2008: Mataró

Senior career*
Years	Team	Apps	(Gls)
2008–2009	Vilajuïga	34	(2)
2009–2010	Terrassa	12	(0)
2010	Teruel	6	(0)
2010–2011	San Roque	22	(0)
2011–2012	Espanyol B	27	(0)
2012–2013	FUS Rabat	18	(1)
2013–2015	Parma	13	(0)
2013–2014	→ Siena (loan)	27	(0)
2014–2015	→ Palermo (loan)	7	(0)
2015–2016	Levante	28	(1)
2016–2017	Alavés	27	(2)
2017–2020	Betis	53	(5)
2020–2022	Sporting CP	36	(2)
2022–2023	Valladolid	8	(0)
2023	Alanyaspor	5	(0)
Total		323	(13)

International career^{‡}
2011–2012	Morocco U23	11	(0)
2012–2021	Morocco	22	(1)
Medal record
Representing Morocco
Africa U-23 Cup of Nations
Runner-up	2011 Morocco
- * Club domestic league appearances and goals as of 3 June 2023 ‡ National team caps and goals as of 23:59, 26 March 2021 (UTC)

Zouhair Feddal Agharbi (Arabic: زهير فضال; born 23 December 1989) is a Moroccan former professional footballer who played as a defender.

== Club career ==
=== Early career ===
Born in Tétouan, Feddal started playing for Moghreb Tétouan at a young age, before moving with his family to Spain when at the age of six. In 2006, after representing FC Vilamalla and CF Peralada as a youth, he joined AS Monaco FC's youth setup, but moved back to Spain with CE Mataró in the following year.

Feddal joined UE Vilajuïga in the 2008 summer, making his senior debuts with the side in Tercera División. In July 2009 he signed a three-year deal with Segunda División B side Terrassa FC, but moved to CD Teruel in the fourth tier in January of the following year.

On 13 August 2010, Feddal signed for CD San Roque de Lepe in the third division, after being previously on trial. In May of the following year he moved to RCD Espanyol, being assigned to the reserves in the same level.

Feddal was released by the Pericos in June 2012, and subsequently signed for FUS de Rabat in September.

=== Parma ===
Feddal moved to Italian club Parma in August 2013, being subsequently loaned to Siena in Serie B. He picked no.11 shirt.

Feddal made his debut for the Bianconeri on 14 September 2013, starting in a 2–2 away draw against Juve Stabia. He made 27 appearances for the side before returning to his parent club.

On 2 August 2014, Feddal moved to Palermo in Serie A, with an option for the Sicilians to permanently sign him by the end of the season. He made his debut in the competition on 15 September, starting in a 2–1 loss at Hellas Verona.

Feddal's loan was cut short on 2 February 2015, and he made his Parma debut nine days later, playing the full 90 minutes in a 1–0 home defeat to Chievo Verona.

=== Levante ===
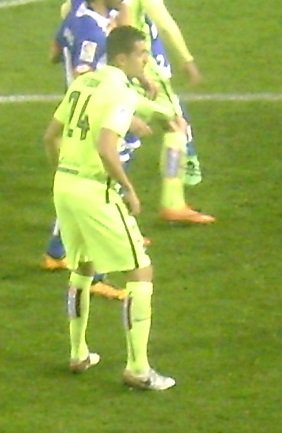
Feddal with Levante in 2016.

On 8 August 2015, Feddal returned to Spain, after agreeing to a three-year deal with La Liga side Levante UD. He made his debut in the category on 30 August, starting in a 0–0 away draw against UD Las Palmas.

Feddal scored his first goal in the main category of Spanish football on 22 November 2015, netting the second in a 3–0 away win against Sporting de Gijón. He was released in May 2016, after the club's relegation, due to a clause in his contract.

=== Alavés ===
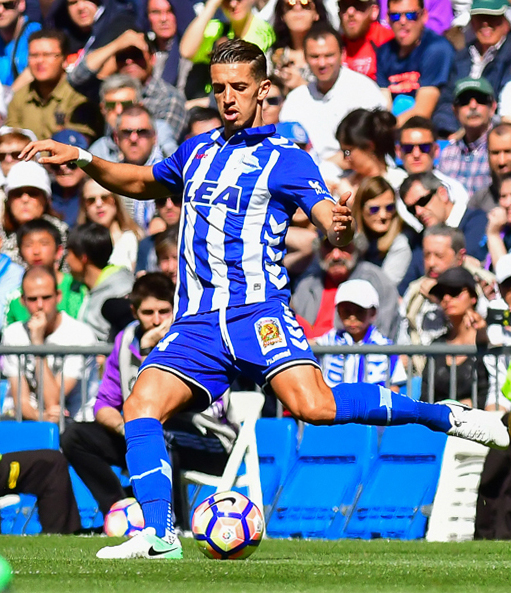
Feddal with Alavés in 2017.

On 16 July 2016, Feddal signed a three-year deal with fellow top-tier club Deportivo Alavés. On 11 March, he netted his first goal for the club against Málaga CF.

=== Betis ===
On 24 July of the following year, Feddal moved to fellow league team Real Betis after agreeing to a four-year deal. He scored his first goal in a 2–1 victory against RC Celta de Vigo.

=== Sporting CP ===
On 18 August 2020, Feddal joined Portuguese club Sporting CP on a two-year deal.

=== Later career ===
On 24 August 2022, free agent Feddal agreed to a one-year contract with Real Valladolid in the Spanish top tier. On 31 January 2023, after just eight league matches, he terminated his contract.

Following a brief stint with Alanyaspor in 2023, Feddal announced his retirement from football on 22 August 2024.

== International career ==
Feddal represented Morocco at under-23 level at the 2012 Summer Olympics. He made his full squad debut on 14 November 2012, starting in a 1–0 friendly loss against Togo.

== Career statistics ==
=== Club ===
As of 7 January 2023

Appearances and goals by club, season and competition
Club	Season	League			Cup		Continental		Other		Total	
Club	Season	Division	Apps	Goals	Apps	Goals	Apps	Goals	Apps	Goals	Apps	Goals
Vilajuïga	2008–09	Tercera División	34	2	—		—		—		34	2
Terrassa	2009–10	Segunda División B	12	0	—		—		—		12	0
Teruel	2009–10	Tercera División	6	0	—		—		—		6	0
San Roque	2010–11	Segunda División B	22	0	—		—		—		22	0
Espanyol B	2011–12	Tercera División	27	0	—		—		—		27	0
FUS Rabat	2012–13	Botola	17	1	—		8 (Note: Appearance(s) in the CAF Champions League)	0	—		25	1
FUS Rabat	2013–14	Botola	1	0	—		3	1	—		4	1
FUS Rabat	Total		18	1	—		11	1	—		29	2
Siena (loan)	2013–14	Serie B	27	0	3	1	—		—		30	1
Palermo (loan)	2014–15	Serie A	7	0	1	0	—		—		8	0
Parma	2014–15	Serie A	13	0	0	0	—		—		13	0
Levante	2015–16	La Liga	28	1	1	0	—		—		29	1
Alavés	2016–17	La Liga	27	2	0	0	—		—		27	2
Real Betis	2017–18	La Liga	15	3	0	0	—		—		15	3
Real Betis	2018–19	La Liga	21	1	5	0	3 (Note: Appearance(s) in the UEFA Europa League)	0	—		29	1
Real Betis	2019–20	La Liga	17	1	1	0	—		—		18	1
Real Betis	Total		53	5	6	0	3	0	0	0	62	5
Sporting CP	2020–21	Primeira Liga	28	2	2	0	2	0	2 (Note: Appearance(s) in the Taça de Portugal)	0	34	2
Sporting CP	2021–22	Primeira Liga	14	0	2	0	6 (Note: Appearance(s) in the UEFA Champions League)	0	3	0	25	0
Sporting CP	Total		42	2	4	0	8	0	5	0	59	2
Real Valladolid	2022–23	La Liga	8	0	2	0	—		—		10	0
Career total			324	13	17	1	22	1	5	0	368	15

=== International ===
As of 26 March 2021

Appearances and goals by national team and year
National team	Year	Apps	Goals
Morocco	2012	1	0
Morocco	2013	4	0
Morocco	2014	5	0
Morocco	2015	4	0
Morocco	2016	1	0
Morocco	2017	1	0
Morocco	2018	0	0
Morocco	2019	4	1
Morocco	2020	1	0
Morocco	2021	1	0
Total		22	1

Scores and results list Morocco's goal tally first, score column indicates score after each Feddal goal.

List of international goals scored by Zouhair Feddal
No.	Date	Venue	Opponent	Score	Result	Competition
1	6 September 2019	Stade de Marrakech, Marrakesh, Morocco	Burkina Faso	1–1	1–1	Friendly

== Honours ==
Alavés

- Copa del Rey runner-up: 2016–17

Sporting CP

- Primeira Liga: 2020–21
- Taça da Liga: 2020–21, 2021–22
- Supertaça Cândido de Oliveira: 2021

Morocco U23

- CAF U-23 Championship runner-up: 2011

== Personal life ==
Feddal acquired a Spanish citizenship in January 2012.
