= Buyout clause =

Clause in a employment contract

A buyout clause or release clause refers to a clause in an employment contract. It allows the employee to terminate the contract unilaterally upon payment of a specified (usually substantial) fee to the employer. The fee may be paid by the employee directly, but is more usually paid by a prospective employer who wishes to acquire the employee's services.

It is most commonly used in reference to sports teams, where a transfer fee is usually paid for a player under contract; however, the current owning club is not obliged to sell their player, and if an agreement on a suitable fee cannot be reached, the buying club can instead resort to paying the player's buyout fee – should their contract have such a clause – which the owning club cannot block. Buyout clauses are usually set at a higher amount than the player's expected market value. However, on occasion, a player at a smaller club will sign a contract but insist on a low buyout fee to attract bigger clubs if their performances generate interest, which de facto functions as a reservation price set for the selling club.

The aim of this clause is twofold; firstly with its high amount, competing teams are discouraged from attempting to acquire the player if the current club shows no signs of selling them, and secondly it raises any hint to the players not to go through with their contractual commitment.

In Spain, buyout clauses have been mandatory in football contracts since 1985. If wishing to rescind their contract, the players are required to pay the buyout fee to their current club personally (via the league body), which would be advanced to them by the club signing them; however this advance of funds was originally deemed by the Spanish government to be taxable income, requiring the buying club to pay income tax on top of the fee itself, with the prohibitively high costs involved in this dual transaction discouraging clubs from making such deals. In October 2016 the laws were changed, with the buyout fee advances to the players no longer subject to tax, meaning only the fee itself had to be paid.

As of April 2025, the €1 billion buyout-clause tier in football included 11 players: Barcelona's Pedri, Ferran Torres, Gavi, Lamine Yamal, Ansu Fati and Jules Koundé, plus Real Madrid's Vinícius Júnior, Jude Bellingham, Kylian Mbappé, Eduardo Camavinga and Rodrygo.

On 3 August 2017, Paris Saint-Germain activated the buyout clause of Brazilian footballer Neymar from FC Barcelona, which was set at €222 million, making him the most expensive football player in history, ahead of the previous record set by Paul Pogba (€105 million) in 2016, when he returned to English club Manchester United from Juventus.
