= 2020–21 Sporting CP season =

Sporting CP
2020–21 season
- President: Frederico Varandas
- Head coach: Ruben Amorim
- Stadium: Estádio José Alvalade
- Primeira Liga: 1st
- Taça de Portugal: Fifth round
- Taça da Liga: Winners
- UEFA Europa League: Play-off round
- Top goalscorer: League: Pedro Gonçalves (23); All: Pedro Gonçalves (23)
Home colours	Away colours	Third colours

The 2020–21 season was the 115th season in existence of Sporting Clube de Portugal and the club's 87th consecutive season in the top flight of Portuguese football. In addition to the domestic league, Sporting CP participated in this season's editions of the Taça de Portugal and the UEFA Europa League. The club also qualified for the Taça da Liga, winning the competition and achieving an unofficial double. The season covered the period from 26 July 2020 to 30 June 2021.

Sporting won the 2020–21 Primeira Liga with two matches remaining, following a 1–0 home win against Boavista, and thus became Portuguese champions for the 19th time in their history, and for the first time since the 2001–02 season. In this season, Sporting set a league record for the longest unbeaten run in a single season with 32 matches in a row (25 wins and seven draws) out of 34 matches.

== Players ==
=== First-team squad ===
As of 15 February 2021.

Note: Flags indicate national team as defined under FIFA eligibility rules; some limited exceptions apply. Players may hold more than one non-FIFA nationality.

No.	Pos.	Nation	Player
1	GK	ESP	Antonio Adán
2	DF	BRA	Matheus Reis (on loan from Rio Ave)
3	DF	MAR	Zouhair Feddal
4	DF	URU	Sebastián Coates (captain)
5	DF	POR	Nuno Mendes
6	MF	POR	João Palhinha
7	FW	BRA	Bruno Tabata
8	MF	BRA	Matheus Nunes
11	FW	POR	Nuno Santos
13	DF	POR	Luís Neto
17	MF	POR	João Mário (on loan from Inter Milan)
19	FW	POR	Tiago Tomás

No.	Pos.	Nation	Player
20	FW	ECU	Gonzalo Plata
21	FW	POR	Paulinho
22	GK	POR	André Paulo
24	DF	ESP	Pedro Porro (on loan from Manchester City)
27	DF	POR	João Pereira
28	MF	POR	Pedro Gonçalves
52	DF	POR	Gonçalo Inácio
55	DF	POR	Vitorino Antunes
68	MF	POR	Daniel Bragança
72	DF	POR	Eduardo Quaresma
77	FW	CPV	Jovane Cabral
81	GK	POR	Luís Maximiano

=== Other players under contract ===
Note: Flags indicate national team as defined under FIFA eligibility rules; some limited exceptions apply. Players may hold more than one non-FIFA nationality.

No.	Pos.	Nation	Player
40	GK	BRA	Renan Ribeiro
76	DF	ANG	Bruno Gaspar
80	MF	POR	Rodrigo Fernandes

No.	Pos.	Nation	Player
89	DF	GHA	Lumor
96	FW	POR	Joelson
99	GK	POR	Diogo Sousa

=== Out on loan ===
Note: Flags indicate national team as defined under FIFA eligibility rules; some limited exceptions apply. Players may hold more than one non-FIFA nationality.

No.	Pos.	Nation	Player
—	DF	POR	Ivanildo Fernandes (at Almería until 30 June 2021)
—	DF	POR	Tiago Ilori (at Lorient until 30 June 2021)
—	DF	POR	Mauro Riquicho (at Fátima until 30 June 2021)
—	DF	FRA	Valentin Rosier (at Beşiktaş until 30 June 2021)
—	DF	POR	João Silva (at Istra 1961 until 30 June 2021)
—	MF	ARG	Rodrigo Battaglia (at Alavés until 30 June 2021)
—	MF	POR	Filipe Chaby (at Académica until 30 June 2021)
—	MF	MLI	Abdoulay Diaby (at Getafe until 30 June 2021)
—	MF	CIV	Idrissa Doumbia (at Huesca until 30 June 2021)

No.	Pos.	Nation	Player
—	MF	BRA	Eduardo (at Crotone until 30 June 2021)
—	MF	BRA	Mattheus (at Coritiba until 30 June 2021)
—	MF	CRO	Josip Mišić (at Dinamo Zagreb until 30 June 2021)
—	FW	COL	Leonardo Acevedo (at Logroñés until 30 June 2021)
—	FW	POR	Rafael Camacho (at Rio Ave until 30 June 2021)
—	FW	POR	Pedro Marques (at Gil Vicente until 30 June 2021)
—	FW	POR	Pedro Mendes (at Nacional until 30 June 2021)
—	FW	SLO	Andraž Šporar (at Braga until 30 June 2021)

== Transfers ==
=== In ===
No.	Pos.	Player	Transferred from	Fee	Date	Source
1	GK	(Spain) Antonio Adán	(Spain) Atlético Madrid	Free transfer	20 August 2020	

=== Out ===
No.	Pos.	Player	Transferred to	Fee	Date	Source
15			TBD		1 July 2020	

== Pre-season and friendlies ==
Win Draw Loss

28 August 2020 Friendly	Portimonense (Portugal)	1–2	(Portugal) Sporting CP	Portimão, Portugal
20:30 WEST (UTC+1)	Possignolo 53' (pen.)	Report	Šporar 65' (pen.); Tomás 74'	Stadium: Estádio Municipal de Portimão; Referee: Miguel Nogueira

30 August 2020 Friendly	Sporting CP (Portugal)	3–1	(Portugal) Belenenses	Faro, Portugal
20:30 WEST (UTC+1)	Gonçalves 14'; Tomás 23'; Šporar 74'	Report	Agrelos 85'	Stadium: Estádio Algarve; Referee: Hugo Silva

4 September 2020 Friendly	Sporting CP (Portugal)	2–1	(Spain) Valladolid	Alverca do Ribatejo, Portugal
20:00 WEST (UTC+1)	Feddal 71'; Cabral 79' (pen.)	Report	Gassama 64' (pen.); Miguel Ángel (red card) 78'	Stadium: Complexo Desportivo FC Alverca

13 September 2020 Troféu Cinco Violinos	Sporting CP (Portugal)	Cancelled	(Italy) Napoli	Lisbon, Portugal
19:30 WEST (UTC+1)				Stadium: Estádio José Alvalade
Note: The match was cancelled after several Sporting CP players tested positive for COVID-19.

== Competitions ==
=== Overview ===
Competition	First match	Last match	Starting round	Final position	Record							
Competition	First match	Last match	Starting round	Final position	Pld	W	D	L	GF	GA	GD	Win %
Primeira Liga	27 September 2020	19 May 2021	Matchday 1	Winners	34	26	7	1	65	20	+45	76.47
Taça de Portugal	23 November 2020	11 January 2021	Third round	Fifth round	3	2	0	1	10	3	+7	66.67
Taça da Liga	15 December 2020	23 January 2021	Quarter-finals	Winners	3	3	0	0	5	1	+4	100.00
Europa League	24 September 2020	1 October 2020	Third qualifying round	Play-off round	2	1	0	1	2	4	−2	50.00
Total					42	32	7	3	82	28	+54	76.19

Source: Soccerway

=== Primeira Liga ===
==== League table ====
Pos	Team	Pld	W	D	L	GF	GA	GD	Pts	Qualification or relegation
1	Sporting CP (C)	34	26	7	1	65	20	+45	85	Qualification for the Champions League group stage
2	Porto	34	24	8	2	74	29	+45	80	Qualification for the Champions League group stage
3	Benfica	34	23	7	4	69	27	+42	76	Qualification for the Champions League third qualifying round
4	Braga	34	19	7	8	53	33	+20	64	Qualification for the Europa League group stage (Note: Braga qualified for the Europa League group stage by winning the 2020–21 Taça de Portugal. Since they would have qualified for the Europa Conference League third qualifying round by finishing fourth, the berth was awarded to the fifth-placed team (Paços de Ferreira), and the Europa Conference League second qualifying round berth reserved to the fifth-placed team was awarded to the sixth-placed team (Santa Clara).)
5	Paços de Ferreira	34	15	8	11	40	41	−1	53	Qualification for the Europa Conference League third qualifying round

Source: Liga Portugal
Rules for classification: 1) Points; 2) Head-to-head points; 3) Head-to-head goal difference; 4) Head-to-head away goals scored; 5) Goal difference; 6) Matches won; 7) Goals scored; 8) Play-off.
(C) Champions

==== Results summary ====
Overall								Home						Away					
Pld	W	D	L	GF	GA	GD	Pts	W	D	L	GF	GA	GD	W	D	L	GF	GA	GD
34	26	7	1	65	20	+45	85	13	4	0	34	10	+24	13	3	1	31	10	+21

Source: Liga Portugal

==== Results by round ====
Round	1	2	3	4	5	6	7	8	9	10	11	12	13	14	15	16	17	18	19	20	21	22	23	24	25	26	27	28	29	30	31	32	33	34
Ground	H	A	A	H	A	H	A	H	A	H	A	H	A	H	A	H	A	A	H	H	A	H	A	H	A	H	A	H	A	H	A	H	A	H
Result	W	W	D	W	W	W	W	W	D	W	W	W	W	D	W	W	W	W	W	W	D	W	W	W	D	D	W	D	W	W	W	W	L	W
Position	3	3	2	2	2	1	1	1	1	1	1	1	1	1	1	1	1	1	1	1	1	1	1	1	1	1	1	1	1	1	1	1	1	1

Source: Liga Portugal
A = Away; H = Home; W = Win; D = Draw; L = Loss

==== Matches ====
The league fixtures were announced on 28 August 2020.

27 September 2020 2	Paços de Ferreira	0–2	Sporting CP	Paços de Ferreira
18:30 WEST (UTC+1)	Douglas (yellow card) 21'; Eustáquio (yellow card) 74'	Report	Neto (yellow card) 10'; Cabral 23' (pen.), (yellow card) 25'; Wendel (yellow card) 36'; Adán (yellow card) 45+3'; Coates 63'; Nunes (yellow card) 80'; Feddal (yellow card) 84'	Stadium: Estádio da Mata Real; Attendance: 0 (Note: The match was played behind closed doors due to the COVID-19 pandemic in Portugal.); Referee: Fábio Veríssimo

4 October 2020 3	Portimonense	0–2	Sporting CP	Portimão
21:00 WEST (UTC+1)	Lucas Fernandes (yellow card) 40'	Report	Mendes 4'; Santos 11'; Coates (yellow card) 46'	Stadium: Estádio Municipal de Portimão; Attendance: 0 Referee: Manuel Oliveira

17 October 2020 4	Sporting CP	2–2	Porto	Lisbon
20:30 WEST (UTC+1)	Santos 9'; Gonçalves (yellow card) 11'; Neto (yellow card) 45+7'; Feddal (yellow card) 61'; Vietto (yellow card) 78', (goal) 87'; Coates (yellow card) 79'	Report	Corona (yellow card) 19', (goal) 45'; Sanusi (yellow card) 20'; Uribe 25'; Otávio (yellow card) 54'; Marchesín (yellow card) 86'	Stadium: Estádio José Alvalade; Attendance: 0 Referee: Luís Godinho

24 October 2020 5	Santa Clara	1–2	Sporting CP	Ponta Delgada
19:00 WEST (UTC+1)	González (yellow card) 18'; Thiago Santana 42'; Sagna (yellow card) 45'; Carvalho (yellow card) 63'	Report	Gonçalves 20', 81'; Coates (yellow card) 90+3'	Stadium: Estádio de São Miguel; Attendance: 932; Referee: Manuel Mota

28 October 2020 1	Sporting CP	3–1	Gil Vicente	Lisbon
21:45 WET (UTC±0)	Palhinha (yellow card) 1'; Neto (yellow card) 60'; Feddal (yellow card) 64'; Gonçalves (yellow card) 64', (goal) 90+5'; Šporar (yellow card) 68', (goal) 83'; Tomás 84'	Report	Denis (yellow card) 35'; João Afonso (yellow card) 37'; Mineiro 52'; Miullen (yellow card) 66'; Rodrigão (yellow card) 88'	Stadium: Estádio José Alvalade; Attendance: 0 Referee: André Narciso

1 November 2020 6	Sporting CP	4–0	Tondela	Lisbon
20:00 WET (UTC±0)	Palhinha (yellow card) 32'; Gonçalves 45', 49'; Porro 79'; Nunes (yellow card) 85'; Santos (yellow card) 86'; Šporar 90+3'	Report	Ferreira (yellow card) 28'; Augusto (yellow card) 85'	Stadium: Estádio José Alvalade; Attendance: 0 Referee: António Nobre

7 November 2020 7	Vitória de Guimarães	0–4	Sporting CP	Guimarães
20:30 WET (UTC±0)	Agu (yellow card) 3'; André (yellow card) 39'; Suliman (yellow card) 42'	Report	Santos 11'; Porro (yellow card) 39'; Gonçalves 43', 55'; Cabral 79'	Stadium: Estádio D. Afonso Henriques; Attendance: 0 Referee: Hugo Miguel

28 November 2020 8	Sporting CP	2–1	Moreirense	Lisbon
20:30 WET (UTC±0)	Gonçalves 8', 75'; Santos (yellow card) 78'	Report	Neto 3' (o.g.); Lacerda (yellow card) 74'; Galego (yellow card) 82'	Stadium: Estádio José Alvalade; Attendance: 0 Referee: Vítor Ferreira

5 December 2020 9	Famalicão	2–2	Sporting CP	Vila Nova de Famalicão
18:00 WET (UTC±0)	Campana (yellow card) 8'; Assunção 43', (yellow card) 68'; Riccieli (yellow card) 45'; Pereyra (yellow card) 45+3'; Babić (yellow card) 74'; Jhonata Robert (yellow card) 83', (goal) 89'	Report	Gonçalves (yellow card) 22' (yellow-red card) 80', (goal) 37'; Santos (yellow card) 45'; Porro 45+4'; Palhinha (yellow card) 87'; Feddal (yellow card) 90+3'	Stadium: Estádio Municipal 22 de Junho; Attendance: 0 Referee: Luís Godinho

19 December 2020 10	Sporting CP	1–0	Farense	Lisbon
20:30 WET (UTC±0)	Tomás (yellow card) 26'; Palhinha (yellow card) 41'; Coates (yellow card) 68'; Šporar 90+1' (pen.); Santos (yellow card) 90+7'	Report	Defendi (yellow card) 36' (yellow-red card) 86'; Isidoro (yellow card) 43'; Nunes (yellow card) 75'; Mancha (yellow card) 83'	Stadium: Estádio José Alvalade; Attendance: 0 Referee: André Narciso

27 December 2020 11	Belenenses SAD	1–2	Sporting CP	Oeiras
20:00 WET (UTC±0)	Cardoso 14', (penalty missed) 16', (yellow card) 45+1'; Esgaio (yellow card) 23'; Ribeiro (yellow card) 75' (yellow-red card) 77'	Report	Tomás 5'; Adán (yellow card) 16'; João Mário 24' (pen.); Inácio (yellow card) 63'; Neto (yellow card) 82'	Stadium: Estádio Nacional; Attendance: 0 Referee: Rui Costa

2 January 2021 12	Sporting CP	2–0	Braga	Lisbon
18:00 WET (UTC±0)	Gonçalves 54'; Nunes 78', (yellow card) 90+1'; Porro (yellow card) 79'; Antunes (yellow card) 90+2'	Report	Galeno (yellow card) 37'; Silva (yellow card) 51'; Elmusrati (yellow card) 58'; Matheus (yellow card) 88'	Stadium: Estádio José Alvalade; Attendance: 0 Referee: Fábio Veríssimo

8 January 2021 13	Nacional	0–2	Sporting CP	Madeira
18:00 WET (UTC±0)	Micael (yellow card) 11'; Borges (yellow card) 61'; Freitas (yellow card) 69'	Report	Feddal (yellow card) 27'; Santos 43'; Cabral 90'	Stadium: Estádio da Madeira; Attendance: 0 Referee: Manuel Mota

15 January 2021 14	Sporting CP	1–1	Rio Ave	Lisbon
18:30 WET (UTC±0)	Plata (yellow card) 7'; João Mário (yellow card) 24'; Gonçalves 42'; Tabata (yellow card) 87'	Report	Amaral (yellow card) 15'; Coentrão (yellow card) 25'; Gelson 61'; Tarantini (yellow card) 69'; Gabrielzinho (yellow card) 69'; Rodrigues (yellow card) 83'; Pereira (yellow card) 90+4'	Stadium: Estádio José Alvalade; Attendance: 0 Referee: Hélder Malheiro

26 January 2021 15	Boavista	0–2	Sporting CP	Porto
21:15 WET (UTC±0)	Paulinho (yellow card) 87'; Nathan (yellow card) 90'	Report	Santos 24'; Porro 77'; Palhinha (yellow card) 79'; João Mário (yellow card) 79'	Stadium: Estádio do Bessa; Attendance: 0 Referee: Fábio Veríssimo

1 February 2021 16	Sporting CP	1–0	Benfica	Lisbon
21:30 WET (UTC±0)	Tomás (yellow card) 15'; Neto (yellow card) 40'; Nunes 90+2'; Tabata (yellow card) 90+5'	Report	Gilberto (yellow card) 13'; Weigl (yellow card) 16'; Otamendi (yellow card) 53'; Pizzi (yellow card) 76'; Gabriel (yellow card) 79'	Stadium: Estádio José Alvalade; Attendance: 0 Referee: Artur Soares Dias

5 February 2021 17	Marítimo	0–2	Sporting CP	Funchal
19:00 WET (UTC±0)	Andrade (yellow card) 30'; Renê (yellow card) 84'	Report	Gonçalves 9', 57'; Pereira (yellow card) 90+3'	Stadium: Estádio do Marítimo; Attendance: 0 Referee: Hugo Miguel

9 February 2021 18	Gil Vicente	1–2	Sporting CP	Barcelos
21:00 WET (UTC±0)	Lucas (yellow card) 3'; Fujimoto 36'; Lino (yellow card) 73'; Pedrinho (yellow card) 87'; Denis (yellow card) 89'	Report	Nunes (yellow card) 31'; Coates 83', 90+1'	Stadium: Estádio Cidade de Barcelos; Attendance: 0 Referee: Nuno Almeida

15 February 2021 19	Sporting CP	2–0	Paços de Ferreira	Lisbon
20:15 WET (UTC±0)	Mendes (yellow card) 8'; Feddal (yellow card) 14'; João Mário 20' (pen.); Palhinha 48'; Porro (yellow card) 54'; Adán (yellow card) 75'; Cabral (yellow card) 88'	Report	Baixinho (yellow card) 13'; Rebocho (yellow card) 19'; Douglas (yellow card) 22'	Stadium: Estádio José Alvalade; Attendance: 0 Referee: André Narciso

20 February 2021 20	Sporting CP	2–0	Portimonense	Lisbon
20:30 WET (UTC±0)	Feddal 27'; Santos 31'	Report	Ewerton (yellow card) 37'; Henrique (yellow card) 49'; Dener (yellow card) 90+1'	Stadium: Estádio José Alvalade; Attendance: 0 Referee: Rui Costa

27 February 2021 21	Porto	0–0	Sporting CP	Porto
20:30 WET (UTC±0)	Pepe (yellow card) 55'	Report	Mendes (yellow card) 27'; Feddal (yellow card) 55'	Stadium: Estádio do Dragão; Attendance: 0 Referee: João Pinheiro

5 March 2021 22	Sporting CP	2–1	Santa Clara	Lisbon
20:45 WET (UTC±0)	Gonçalves 22'; Antunes (yellow card) 90+1'; Coates 90+3'	Report	Carvalho (yellow card) 41'; Cardoso (yellow card) 62'; Costa 84'	Stadium: Estádio José Alvalade; Attendance: 0 Referee: Manuel Oliveira

13 March 2021 23	Tondela	0–1	Sporting CP	Tondela
20:30 WET (UTC±0)	Khacef (yellow card) 40'; Olabe (yellow card) 52'; Alves (yellow card) 60'	Report	Coates (yellow card) 44'; Pereira (red card) 56'; Tomás 81'	Stadium: Estádio João Cardoso; Attendance: 0 Referee: Nuno Almeida

20 March 2021 24	Sporting CP	1–0	Vitória de Guimarães	Lisbon
20:30 WET (UTC±0)	Inácio 44'; Neto (yellow card) 68'; João Mário (yellow card) 72'	Report	Pepelu (yellow card) 89'	Stadium: Estádio José Alvalade; Attendance: 0 Referee: Tiago Martins

5 April 2021 25	Moreirense	1–1	Sporting CP	Moreira de Cónegos
21:00 WEST (UTC+1)	Ba (yellow card) 39'; Walterson 90'; Pasinato (yellow card) 90+5'	Report	Paulinho 21'; Tomás (yellow card) 78'; Inácio (yellow card) 85'	Stadium: Parque Joaquim de Almeida Freitas; Attendance: 0 Referee: João Pinheiro

11 April 2021 26	Sporting CP	1–1	Famalicão	Lisbon
20:00 WEST (UTC+1)	Palhinha (yellow card) 10'; Gonçalves 25'; Antunes (yellow card) 51'; Porro (yellow card) 58'	Report	Anderson 27'; William (yellow card) 53'; Riccieli (yellow card) 69'; Luiz Júnior (yellow card) 90+4'	Stadium: Estádio José Alvalade; Attendance: 0 Referee: Rui Costa

16 April 2021 27	Farense	0–1	Sporting CP	Faro
21:00 WEST (UTC+1)	Gauld (yellow card) 90+3'	Report	Gonçalves 35'; Reis (yellow card) 40'; Adán (yellow card) 86'	Stadium: Estádio de São Luís; Attendance: 0 Referee: Hugo Miguel

21 April 2021 28	Sporting CP	2–2	Belenenses SAD	Lisbon
21:15 WEST (UTC+1)	Tomás (yellow card) 3'; João Mário (penalty missed) 42'; Coates 83'; Cabral 90+5' (pen.)	Report	Cassierra 13', 54'; Henrique (yellow card) 41'; Cardoso (yellow card) 81'; Silva (yellow card) 90+1'	Stadium: Estádio José Alvalade; Attendance: 0 Referee: Nuno Almeida

25 April 2021 29	Braga	0–1	Sporting CP	Braga
20:00 WEST (UTC+1)	Fransérgio (yellow card) 17'; Gaitán (yellow card) 64'; A. Horta (yellow card) 78'; Esgaio (yellow card) 90+4'	Report	Inácio (yellow card) 10' (yellow-red card) 18'; Tomás (yellow card) 76'; Nunes 81'; Gonçalves (yellow card) 90+4'; Adán (yellow card) 90+6'	Stadium: Estádio Municipal de Braga; Attendance: 0 Referee: Artur Soares Dias

1 May 2021 30	Sporting CP	2–0	Nacional	Lisbon
20:30 WEST (UTC+1)	Paulinho (yellow card) 31'; Bragança (yellow card) 53'; Feddal 83'; Cabral 90+2' (pen.)	Report	Alhassan (yellow card) 23' (yellow-red card) 67'; Bessa (yellow card) 57'; Júlio César (yellow card) 65'; Correia (yellow card) 90+1'	Stadium: Estádio José Alvalade; Attendance: 0 Referee: Manuel Oliveira

5 May 2021 31	Rio Ave	0–2	Sporting CP	Vila do Conde
21:15 WEST (UTC+1)	Filipe Augusto (yellow card) 23'; Santos (yellow card) 38'; Tarantini (red card) 62'; Coentrão (yellow card) 65'; Brandão (yellow card) 90+4'	Report	Mendes (yellow card) 26'; Gonçalves 34' (pen.); Feddal (yellow card) 42'; Paulinho 63'; Palhinha (yellow card) 74'; Neto (yellow card) 90+3'; Coates (yellow card) 90+4'	Stadium: Estádio dos Arcos; Attendance: 0 Referee: Fábio Veríssimo

11 May 2021 32	Sporting CP	1–0	Boavista	Lisbon
20:30 WEST (UTC+1)	Paulinho 36', (yellow card) 85'; Feddal (yellow card) 61'	Report	Pérez (yellow card) 41'; Gomes (yellow card) 66'; Rami (yellow card) 71'	Stadium: Estádio José Alvalade; Attendance: 0 Referee: Luís Godinho

15 May 2021 33	Benfica	4–3	Sporting CP	Lisbon
18:00 WEST (UTC+1)	Grimaldo (yellow card) 7'; Seferovic 12', 48' (pen.); Pizzi 29'; Veríssimo 37', (yellow card) 38'; Otamendi (yellow card) 43'; Gabriel (yellow card) 57'; Tavares (yellow card) 87'; Núñez (yellow card) 90+2'	Report	Reis (yellow card) 31'; Gonçalves 45+1', 77' (pen.), (yellow card) 90+2'; Mendes (yellow card) 57'; Santos 62'; João Mário (yellow card) 65'	Stadium: Estádio da Luz; Attendance: 0 Referee: Tiago Martins

19 May 2021 34	Sporting CP	5–1	Marítimo	Lisbon
21:45 WEST (UTC+1)	Gonçalves 7', 20', 62'; Karo 21' (o.g.); Nunes (yellow card) 28'; Coates (yellow card) 46'; Plata 75'; Tomás (yellow card) 79'	Report	Cléber (yellow card) 66'; Beltrame 89'	Stadium: Estádio José Alvalade; Attendance: 0 Referee: Gustavo Correia

=== Taça de Portugal ===
23 November 2020 Third round	Sacavenense	1–7	Sporting CP	Sacavém
21:15 WET (UTC±0)	Iaquinta 53'	Report	Santos 3'; Coates 26', 47'; Cabral 32' (pen.); Marques 86', 90'; Inácio 90+2'	Stadium: Complexo Desportivo Elias Pereira; Attendance: 0 Referee: Helder Malheiro

11 December 2020 Fourth round	Sporting CP	3–0	Paços de Ferreira	Lisbon
21:15 WET (UTC±0)	Porro (yellow card) 22'; Tomás 26'; Tabata 44'; Palhinha (yellow card) 61', (goal) 64'; Santos (yellow card) 71'	Report	Castanheira (yellow card) 82'	Stadium: Estádio José Alvalade; Attendance: 0 Referee: João Pinheiro

11 January 2021 Fifth round	Marítimo	2–0	Sporting CP	Funchal
21:15 WET (UTC±0)	Joel (yellow card) 45+4'; Andrade (yellow card) 49', (goal) 79'; Winck (yellow card) 61'; Pinho 68'; Correa (yellow card) 90+5'	Report	Neto (yellow card) 37'; Tabata (yellow card) 66'; Gonçalves (yellow card) 72'; Plata (yellow card) 90+5'	Stadium: Estádio do Marítimo; Attendance: 0 Referee: Manuel Oliveira

=== Taça da Liga ===
15 December 2020 Quarter-finals	Sporting CP	2–0	Mafra	Lisbon
20:15 WET (UTC±0)	Šporar 64'; Tabata 71'	Report	Lourenço (yellow card) 29'; Camará (yellow card) 40'; Graça (yellow card) 58'; Okitokandjo (yellow card) 72'	Stadium: Estádio José Alvalade; Attendance: 0 Referee: Tiago Martins

19 January 2021 Semi-finals	Sporting CP	2–1	Porto	Leiria
19:45 WET (UTC±0)	Porro (yellow card) 42'; Palhinha (yellow card) 52'; Coates (yellow card) 57'; Antunes (yellow card) 72'; Cabral 86', 90+4'	Report	Grujić (yellow card) 35'; Anderson (yellow card) 43'; Marega 79'; Vieira (yellow card) 90+6'	Stadium: Estádio Dr. Magalhães Pessoa; Attendance: 0 Referee: João Pinheiro

23 January 2021 Final	Sporting CP	1–0	Braga	Leiria
19:45 WET (UTC±0)	Cabral (yellow card) 24'; Porro 41', (yellow card) 81'; Mendes (yellow card) 76'; Nunes (yellow card) 87'; Gonçalves (yellow card) 90+5', (red card) 90+6'; Neto (yellow card) 90+6'	Report	Sequeira (yellow card) 32'; Elmusrati (yellow card) 90+4'	Stadium: Estádio Dr. Magalhães Pessoa; Attendance: 0 Referee: Tiago Martins

=== UEFA Europa League ===
24 September 2020 Third qualifying round	Sporting CP (Portugal)	1–0	(Scotland) Aberdeen	Lisbon, Portugal
20:00 WEST (UTC+1)	Tomás 8', (yellow card) 64'; Vietto (yellow card) 30'	Report	McLennan (yellow card) 90+3'	Stadium: Estádio José Alvalade; Attendance: 0 Referee: Nikola Dabanović (Montenegro)

1 October 2020 Play-off round	Sporting CP (Portugal)	1–4	(Austria) LASK	Lisbon, Portugal
20:00 WEST (UTC+1)	Neto (yellow card) 25'; Porro (yellow card) 36'; Tomás 42'; Coates (red card) 63'; Gonçalves (yellow card) 90+3'	Report	Trauner 14'; Michorl (yellow card) 20'; Raguž 58'; Michorls 65'; Gruber 69'	Stadium: Estádio José Alvalade; Attendance: 0 Referee: Aleksei Kulbakov (Belarus)

== Statistics ==
=== Appearances and goals ===
No.	Pos	Nat	Player	Total		Primeira Liga		Taça de Portugal		Taça da Liga		UEFA Europa League	
No.	Pos	Nat	Player	Apps	Goals	Apps	Goals	Apps	Goals	Apps	Goals	Apps	Goals
Goalkeepers
1	GK	(Spain) ESP	Antonio Adán	37	0	32	0	1	0	2	0	2	0
22	GK	(Portugal) POR	André Paulo	1	0	0+1	0	0	0	0	0	0	0
40	GK	(Brazil) BRA	Renan Ribeiro	0	0	0	0	0	0	0	0	0	0
81	GK	(Portugal) POR	Luís Maximiano	5	0	2	0	2	0	1	0	0	0
99	GK	(Portugal) POR	Diogo Sousa	0	0	0	0	0	0	0	0	0	0
Defenders
2	DF	(Brazil) BRA	Matheus Reis	15	0	4+11	0	0	0	0	0	0	0
3	DF	(Morocco) MAR	Zouhair Feddal	34	2	28	2	2	0	2	0	2	0
4	DF	(Uruguay) URU	Sebastián Coates	40	7	33	5	2+1	2	2	0	2	0
5	DF	(Portugal) POR	Nuno Mendes	35	1	29	1	2	0	1+1	0	2	0
13	DF	(Portugal) POR	Luís Neto	28	0	20+2	0	3	0	0+1	0	2	0
24	DF	(Spain) ESP	Pedro Porro	37	4	30	3	1+1	0	2+1	1	2	0
27	DF	(Portugal) POR	João Pereira	5	0	3+2	0	0	0	0	0	0	0
52	DF	(Portugal) POR	Gonçalo Inácio	25	2	15+5	1	1+1	1	3	0	0	0
55	DF	(Portugal) POR	Vitorino Antunes	13	0	4+4	0	1+1	0	2	0	0+1	0
72	DF	(Portugal) POR	Eduardo Quaresma	3	0	1+1	0	0	0	1	0	0	0
Midfielders
6	MF	(Portugal) POR	João Palhinha	38	2	28+4	1	2+1	1	2+1	0	0	0
8	MF	(Brazil) BRA	Matheus Nunes	39	3	12+19	3	2+1	0	1+2	0	2	0
17	MF	(Portugal) POR	João Mário	34	2	24+4	2	2+1	0	2+1	0	0	0
28	MF	(Portugal) POR	Pedro Gonçalves	37	23	32	23	0+1	0	3	0	0+1	0
68	MF	(Portugal) POR	Daniel Bragança	25	0	6+15	0	0+1	0	1+1	0	0+1	0
80	MF	(Portugal) POR	Rodrigo Fernandes	0	0	0	0	0	0	0	0	0	0
82	MF	(Portugal) POR	Tomás Silva	1	0	0+1	0	0	0	0	0	0	0
84	MF	(Portugal) POR	Dário Essugo	1	0	0+1	0	0	0	0	0	0	0
Forwards
7	FW	(Brazil) BRA	Bruno Tabata	20	2	2+14	0	2+1	1	0+1	1	0	0
11	FW	(Portugal) POR	Nuno Santos	37	8	23+8	7	3	1	1+1	0	1	0
19	FW	(Portugal) POR	Tiago Tomás	37	6	16+14	3	2	1	3	0	2	2
20	FW	(Ecuador) ECU	Gonzalo Plata	14	1	1+8	1	1+1	0	1+1	0	0+1	0
21	FW	(Portugal) POR	Paulinho	14	3	13+1	3	0	0	0	0	0	0
29	FW	(Brazil) BRA	Luiz Phellype	0	0	0	0	0	0	0	0	0	0
77	FW	(Cape Verde) CPV	Jovane Cabral	28	8	6+18	5	1	1	1+1	2	1	0
Players who have made an appearance this season but have left the club
9	FW	(Slovenia) SLO	Andraž Šporar	20	4	6+7	3	1+2	0	1+1	1	0+2	0
10	FW	(Argentina) ARG	Luciano Vietto	5	1	2+1	1	0	0	0	0	2	0
23	DF	(North Macedonia) MKD	Stefan Ristovski	0	0	0	0	0	0	0	0	0	0
25	FW	(Portugal) POR	Pedro Marques	1	2	0	0	0+1	2	0	0	0	0
26	DF	(Colombia) COL	Cristian Borja	4	0	1+1	0	1	0	1	0	0	0
27	MF	(Portugal) POR	Miguel Luís	0	0	0	0	0	0	0	0	0	0
37	MF	(Brazil) BRA	Wendel	3	0	1	0	0	0	0	0	2	0
73	DF	(Portugal) POR	Tiago Ilori	0	0	0	0	0	0	0	0	0	0
74	DF	(France) FRA	Valentin Rosier	0	0	0	0	0	0	0	0	0	0
78	FW	(Portugal) POR	Rafael Camacho	0	0	0	0	0	0	0	0	0	0
98	MF	(Ivory Coast) CIV	Idrissa Doumbia	0	0	0	0	0	0	0	0	0	0

- Source: [[[Category:All articles with unsourced statements]]]

=== Goalscorers ===
Rank	No.	Pos.	Nat	Name	Primeira Liga	Taça de Portugal	Taça da Liga	Europa League	Total
1	28	FW	(Portugal)	Pedro Gonçalves	23	0	0	0	23
2	11	FW	(Portugal)	Nuno Santos	7	1	0	0	8
2	77	FW	(Cape Verde)	Jovane Cabral	5	1	2	0	8
4	4	DF	(Uruguay)	Sebastián Coates	5	2	0	0	7
5	19	FW	(Portugal)	Tiago Tomás	3	1	0	2	6
6	9	FW	(Slovenia)	Andraž Šporar (Note: Player left during the season)	3	0	1	0	4
6	24	MF	(Spain)	Pedro Porro	3	0	1	0	4
8	8	MF	(Brazil)	Matheus Nunes	3	0	0	0	3
8	21	FW	(Portugal)	Paulinho	3	0	0	0	3
10	3	DF	(Morocco)	Zouhair Feddal	2	0	0	0	2
10	6	MF	(Portugal)	João Palhinha	1	1	0	0	2
10	7	MF	(Portugal)	Bruno Tabata	0	1	1	0	2
10	17	MF	(Portugal)	João Mário	2	0	0	0	2
10	25	FW	(Portugal)	Pedro Marques	0	2	0	0	2
10	52	DF	(Portugal)	Gonçalo Inácio	1	1	0	0	2
16	10	FW	(Argentina)	Luciano Vietto	1	0	0	0	1
16	20	FW	(Ecuador)	Gonzalo Plata	1	0	0	0	1
16	35	DF	(Portugal)	Nuno Mendes	1	0	0	0	1
Own goals					1	0	0	0	1
Totals					65	10	5	2	82
