= João Palhinha =

Portuguese footballer (born 1995)

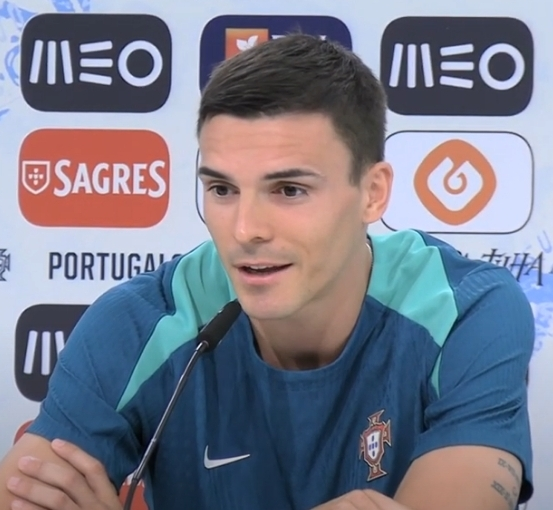
- Palhinha with Portugal in 2024

Personal information
- Full name: João Maria Lobo Alves Palhares Costa Palhinha Gonçalves
- Date of birth: 9 July 1995 (age 31)
- Place of birth: Lisbon, Portugal
- Height: 1.90 m (6 ft 3 in)
- Position: Defensive midfielder

Team information
- Current team: Benfica
- Number: 36

Youth career
- 2008–2009: Alta de Lisboa
- 2009–2012: Sacavenense
- 2012–2014: Sporting CP

Senior career*
Years	Team	Apps	(Gls)
2014–2017	Sporting CP B	21	(1)
2015–2016	→ Moreirense (loan)	29	(0)
2016–2022	Sporting CP	72	(4)
2016–2017	→ Belenenses (loan)	13	(1)
2018–2020	→ Braga (loan)	50	(4)
2022–2024	Fulham	68	(7)
2024–2026	Bayern Munich	17	(0)
2025–2026	→ Tottenham Hotspur (loan)	33	(5)
2026–	Benfica	9	(0)

International career^{‡}
2013	Portugal U18	2	(0)
2013−2014	Portugal U19	14	(1)
2015	Portugal U20	2	(0)
2021−	Portugal	41	(2)
Medal record
Men's football
Representing Portugal
UEFA Nations League
Winner	2025 Germany
UEFA European Under-19 Championship
Runner-up	2014 Hungary
- * Club domestic league appearances and goals as of 23:39, 8 November 2026 (UTC) ‡ National team caps and goals as of 22:30, 14 November 2026 (UTC)

João Maria Lobo Alves Palhares Costa Palhinha Gonçalves (Portuguese pronunciation: [ʒuˈɐ̃w̃ pɐˈʎiɲɐ]; born 9 July 1995) is a Portuguese professional footballer who plays as a defensive midfielder for Primeira Liga club Benfica and the Portugal national team.

He came through at Sporting CP, first appearing with the first team in 2017 and also having loans at Moreirense, Belenenses and Braga. After returning in 2020, he became a starter, notably winning the 2020–21 Primeira Liga and back-to-back Taças da Liga in 2021 and 2022. In July 2022, he was signed by Premier League side Fulham for £20 million, spending two seasons with the club and helping them achieve mid-table finishes in both. He joined Bayern Munich in July 2024, had a loan spell with Tottenham Hotspur before returning to Portugal with Benfica in 2026.

Palhinha finished second with Portugal at the 2014 European Under-19 Championship. He made his full debut in 2021, and was chosen in the squads for the 2022 World Cup and two European Championships (2020 and 2024), also winning the 2024–25 UEFA Nations League.

== Club career ==
=== Sporting CP ===
==== 2012–15: Early career ====
Born in Lisbon, Palhinha joined local Sporting CP's youth system in 2012, aged 17. He played his first game as a professional with the B team, coming on as a late substitute for fellow youth graduate Iuri Medeiros in a 3−2 home win against Portimonense in the Segunda Liga, on 3 February 2014; it was one of only two appearances during the season.

Still in the second division, Palhinha scored his first senior goal on 4 April 2015, his header contributing to a 3−1 home victory over Leixões.

==== 2015–20: Various loans and short return ====
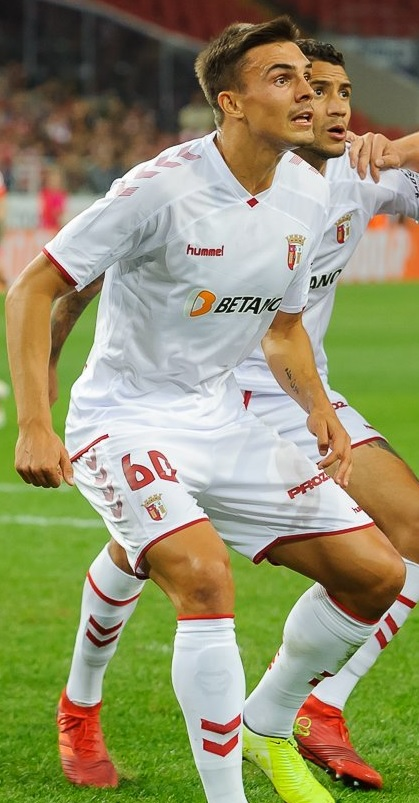
Palhinha playing with Braga in 2019

From July 2015 to January 2017, Palhinha was loaned to Primeira Liga sides Moreirense and Belenenses, respectively, making his debut in the competition whilst with the former in a 0−2 home loss to Arouca where he played 22 minutes from the bench. He scored for the first time while at the service of the latter, against Vitória de Guimarães (1−1 away draw, 90 minutes played).

Subsequently, returning to the Estádio José Alvalade, Palhinha made his competitive debut with the first team on 21 January 2017, starting in a 2−2 draw at Marítimo. He scored his first goals for them on 12 October, netting twice in a 4–2 away win over Oleiros in the Taça de Portugal.

Palhinha spent the following two seasons on loan to Braga. He appeared in 76 competitive matches during his spell, winning the 2019–20 edition of the Taça da Liga and helping to a third-place finish in the same season, notably scoring the game's only goal against Benfica for the club's first win at that opposition in 65 years.

==== 2020–22: Breakthrough and departure ====
Having returned from his loan at Braga, Palhinha wanted to play in a different league, and thus started the 2020–21 campaign training on his own in the midst of negotiations with Al-Nassr and CSKA Moscow. However, after a move failed to materialise, due to Braga possessing a loan clause that required 15% of a future transfer, Sporting felt that the proposals they received were low, leading him to be reinstated in the main squad by his former manager at Braga Ruben Amorim, who chose him as their main defensive midfielder, causing him to renew his contract until 2025. He missed the first month after contracting COVID-19, but recovered to make his return on 17 October starting in the 2–2 home draw with rivals Porto.

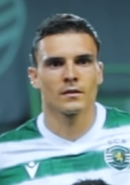
Palhinha with Sporting CP in 2021

On 26 January 2021, Palhinha was suspended for the Lisbon derby against Benfica for accumulation of yellow cards, after being booked in the previous round against Boavista. However, he filed a precautionary measure with the Central Administrative Court of the South, leading him to feature off the bench in the 1–0 win on 1 February. Shortly after, the Court of Arbitration for Sport annulled the automatic sanction of the punishment but did not remove the booking based on the admission of referee Fábio Veríssimo that he had made a mistake, and ended the season without serving the ban. The Portuguese Football Federation took the case to CACS, and the latter's appeal was ultimately accepted given the "absence of CAS jurisdiction to assess and decide on the issue of committing the foreseen infraction", revoking the annulment; the decision was confirmed by the Portuguese Supreme Administrative Court after an appeal filed by Palhinha, who unanimously decided that this body lacked jurisdiction.

Palhinha scored his first goal for Sporting on 15 February 2021, in a 2–0 home defeat of Paços de Ferreira. Over the following months, he proved to be an influential midfield figure, establishing himself as a ball winner and registering the most tackles for the league campaign at 185. He would contribute 32 appearances as the club won the domestic league for the first time in 19 years, being consequently named in the Primeira Liga Team of the Year alongside five of his teammates.

In 2021–22, still under Amorim, Palhinha began facing stiff competition from newly signed Manuel Ugarte, with various injury issues limiting his time and his tackles also reduced compared to the previous season. He later attributed this decline in tackles to the refereeing in Portugal, stating that "in Portugal he felt he couldn't make a tackle, every touch was a yellow card". In total, he played 95 official games during his spell, scoring seven times and winning a national championship, two League Cups and a Supertaça Cândido de Oliveira.

=== Fulham ===
On 4 July 2022, Palhinha signed a five-year contract with Fulham for £20 million. He made his Premier League debut on 6 August, playing the entire 2–2 home draw against Liverpool. He scored his first goal 14 days later, helping the hosts to beat Brentford 3–2. He was his team's Player of the Season with 68% of the votes, to runner-up Bernd Leno's 17%; he also managed to lead all players in tackles, with a total of 147.

On 26 August 2023, Palhinha scored a late equaliser in a 2–2 away draw against Arsenal. On the summer transfer deadline day, he had his medical tests in Germany ahead of a €65 million transfer to Bayern Munich, yet the deal collapsed as Fulham failed to find a replacement before the window shut; on 14 September, he agreed to a new contract until 2028, with an option to extend a further year. He again was the player with the most tackles for the campaign, at 154.

=== Bayern Munich ===
On 11 July 2024, Palhinha joined Bayern Munich on a four-year deal for €51 million, plus €5 million in add-ons, potentially taking the overall fee to €56 million (£47.4 million). He made his official debut on 16 August, as a substitute in a 4–0 win against SSV Ulm in the first round of the DFB-Pokal.

Palhinha won the Bundesliga in his first season. However, he was often sidelined due to physical problems and also faced stiff competition from Leon Goretzka, Joshua Kimmich and Aleksandar Pavlović.

==== Loan to Tottenham Hotspur ====
On 3 August 2025, Palhinha moved to Tottenham Hotspur on a season-long loan with an option to make the deal permanent for €30 million. He made his debut ten days later, playing 72 minutes of the penalty shoot-out loss against Paris Saint-Germain in the UEFA Super Cup (2–2 after extra time). He scored his first goal on 23 August, opening a 2–0 away victory over Manchester City.

Palhinha's second goal came on 24 September 2025, a bicycle kick in a 3–0 defeat of Doncaster Rovers in the third round of the EFL Cup; in that game, he deputised at centre-back. On 4 November, he netted for the first time in the UEFA Champions League, closing the 4–0 home win against Copenhagen in the league phase.

On 25 April 2026, Palhinha scored the only goal at Wolverhampton Wanderers, securing Tottenham's first league victory of the year in their fight against relegation. A month later, in the final matchday, he repeated the feat against Everton to confirm survival.

=== Benfica ===
Palhinha returned to Portugal on 26 August 2026, agreeing to a four-year contract with Benfica.

== International career ==
Palhinha represented Portugal at under-18, under-19 and under-20 levels. He participated in the 2014 UEFA European Under-19 Championship, where his team finished second.

In March 2021, Palhinha was called up to the full side for the first time, for 2022 FIFA World Cup qualifiers against Azerbaijan, Luxembourg and Serbia. He won his first cap in the match with the first adversary, replacing Rúben Neves late into the 1–0 victory in Turin. He scored his first goal in the same phase, closing the 3–1 away win over Luxembourg.

Being selected for UEFA Euro 2020, Palhinha appeared against France in the group stage (2–2) and Belgium in the round of 16 (1–0 loss). In November 2022, he was named in the final squad for the World Cup finals in Qatar, playing all three group-phase matches in an eventual quarter-final exit to Morocco.

Palhinha also made a 26-man squad for Euro 2024. After not featuring in Portugal's opening match against the Czech Republic, he started in the 3–0 victory over Turkey, being substituted by Neves at half-time. He made a further three appearances for the quarter-finalists.

In May 2025, Palhinha was called to the UEFA Nations League Finals. He contributed two minutes for the champions, as a late replacement in the 2–1 defeat of hosts Germany in the semi-finals.

== Player profile ==
=== Style of play ===
Palhinha is known for his defensive positioning, stamina and tackling. Described as an astute ball-winning midfielder, he is especially aggressive in stopping counter-attacks early by lunging into challenges, often preferring slide tackles in order to maximise his radius. A physical and tall player, his height helps him dominate aerial duels and his strength allows him to hold off opponents when dribbling. His ability to break up opposition play, distribute the ball efficiently, and contribute defensively and offensively, has led him to be described as a complete midfielder.

Palhinha usually stays back and covers the back line, with a largely defensive role. He sits in front of the back four, breaking up opposition play as well as acting as the focal point to his team own build-up – playing the ball diagonally into the channels for the side's marauding full-backs and wingers. He was also noted for his strong vocal leadership, serving as a pillar of support while fostering team cohesion and providing essential guidance with clear vocal commands and precise hand gestures.

During his spell at Fulham, Palhinha registered a passing average of 81.5%, his presence helping his team in transition, timing his challenges to secure possession while enabling counter-attacks. He consistently ranked among the Premier League's top players for tackles, interceptions and duels won. In addition, he was the third player to be given 13 or more yellow cards in two separate campaigns, after Olivier Dacourt (1998–99, 2000–01) and Robbie Savage (2001–02, 2003–04).

=== Reception ===
Rio Ferdinand discussed being impressed with Palhinha's first season at Fulham, stating that he had "been sensational" [...] and that a team "need someone like that in front of a defender". His teammate at that club Tom Cairney branded him as "one of the best [players] he had ever seen off the ball, in terms of getting back, recovering and trying to win back the ball.

In March 2023, Fulham manager Marco Silva stated that Palhinha "was an important player in so many moments of the game as well as at set-pieces, due to covering many spaces and allowing the other midfielders to create more freedom." His Portugal coach Roberto Martínez claimed that he had brought balance to his team due to his hard work without the ball, quick ball recovery and transitions, as well as for giving time and space with the ball to other players.

== Personal life ==
Palhinha married singer Patrícia Palhares in 2021, with the couple fathering son João Maria (born October 2022). They separated in September 2024, while she was expecting a second child.

== Career statistics ==
=== Club ===
As of match played 8 November 2026

Appearances and goals by club, season and competition
Club	Season	League			National cup (Note: Includes Taça de Portugal, FA Cup, DFB-Pokal)		League cup (Note: Includes Taça da Liga, EFL Cup)		Europe		Other		Total	
Club	Season	Division	Apps	Goals	Apps	Goals	Apps	Goals	Apps	Goals	Apps	Goals	Apps	Goals
Sporting CP B	2013–14	Segunda Liga	2	0	—		—		—		—		2	0
Sporting CP B	2014–15	Segunda Liga	17	1	—		—		—		—		17	1
Sporting CP B	2016–17	LigaPro	1	0	—		—		—		—		1	0
Sporting CP B	2017–18	LigaPro	1	0	—		—		—		—		1	0
Sporting CP B	Total		21	1	—		—		—		—		21	1
Moreirense (loan)	2015–16	Primeira Liga	29	0	0	0	0	0	—		—		29	0
Sporting CP	2016–17	Primeira Liga	11	0	0	0	—		—		—		11	0
Sporting CP	2017–18	Primeira Liga	2	0	2	2	0	0	3 (Note: Two appearances in UEFA Champions League, one appearance in UEFA Europa League)	0	—		7	2
Sporting CP	2020–21	Primeira Liga	32	1	3	1	3	0	0	0	—		38	2
Sporting CP	2021–22	Primeira Liga	27	3	2	0	3	0	6 (Note: Appearances in UEFA Champions League)	0	1 (Note: Appearance in Supertaça Cândido de Oliveira)	0	39	3
Sporting CP	Total		72	4	7	3	6	0	9	0	1	0	95	7
Belenenses (loan)	2016–17	Primeira Liga	13	1	1	0	4	0	—		—		18	1
Braga (loan)	2018–19	Primeira Liga	23	2	6	0	3	0	—		—		32	2
Braga (loan)	2019–20	Primeira Liga	27	2	2	0	4	1	11 (Note: Appearances in UEFA Europa League)	1	—		44	4
Braga (loan)	Total		50	4	8	0	7	1	11	1	—		76	6
Fulham	2022–23	Premier League	35	3	5	1	0	0	—		—		40	4
Fulham	2023–24	Premier League	33	4	1	0	5	0	—		—		39	4
Fulham	Total		68	7	6	1	5	0	—		—		79	8
Bayern Munich	2024–25	Bundesliga	17	0	2	0	—		5	0	1 (Note: Appearance in FIFA Club World Cup)	0	25	0
Tottenham Hotspur (loan)	2025–26	Premier League	33	5	1	0	2	1	8	1	1 (Note: Appearance in UEFA Super Cup)	0	45	7
Benfica	2026–27	Primeira Liga	9	0	0	0	1	0	4	0	—		14	0
Career total			312	22	25	4	25	2	37	2	3	0	402	30

=== International ===
As of match played 14 November 2026

Appearances and goals by national team and year
National team	Year	Apps	Goals
Portugal	2021	12	2
Portugal	2022	6	0
Portugal	2023	6	0
Portugal	2024	9	0
Portugal	2025	4	0
Portugal	2026	4	0
Total		41	2

As of match played 12 October 2021. Portugal score listed first, score column indicates score after each Palhinha goal.

List of international goals scored by João Palhinha
No.	Date	Venue	Cap	Opponent	Score	Result	Competition
1	30 March 2021	Stade Josy Barthel, Luxembourg City, Luxembourg	3	Luxembourg	3–1	3–1	2022 FIFA World Cup qualification
2	12 October 2021	Estádio Algarve, Loulé/Faro, Portugal	10	Luxembourg	4–0	5–0	2022 FIFA World Cup qualification

== Honours ==
Braga

- Taça da Liga: 2019–20

Sporting CP

- Primeira Liga: 2020–21
- Taça da Liga: 2020–21, 2021–22
- Supertaça Cândido de Oliveira: 2021

Bayern Munich

- Bundesliga: 2024–25

Portugal

- UEFA Nations League: 2024–25

Individual

- Primeira Liga Team of the Year: 2020–21
- Fulham Player of the Season: 2022–23
