= André Paulo =

Portuguese footballer

Personal information
- Full name: André Filipe Eusébio Paulo
- Date of birth: 18 December 1996 (age 29)
- Place of birth: Albufeira, Portugal
- Height: 1.88 m (6 ft 2 in)
- Position: Goalkeeper

Team information
- Current team: Alverca
- Number: 23

Youth career
- 2004–2014: Imortal
- 2014–2015: Portimonense

Senior career*
Years	Team	Apps	(Gls)
2015–2016	Oeiras	11	(0)
2016–2019	Casa Pia	15	(0)
2019–2020	Real Massamá	14	(0)
2020–2022	Sporting CP B	32	(0)
2021–2023	Sporting CP	2	(0)
2023–2024	Mafra	3	(0)
2025	Oliveira Hospital	10	(0)
2025–	Alverca		
- * Club domestic league appearances and goals as of 15:50, 5 July 2025 (UTC)

André Filipe Eusébio Paulo (born 18 December 1996) is a Portuguese professional footballer who plays as a goalkeeper for Primeira Liga club Alverca.

== Club career ==
Born in Albufeira, Algarve, Paulo spent most of his formative years in the academy of Imortal, finishing his youth career with Portimonense. He made his senior debut in the lower leagues of the Lisbon Football Association, winning the 2018–19 Campeonato de Portugal with Casa Pia and failing to achieve another promotion from that tier with Real Massamá in the following season as the league was curtailed by the COVID-19 pandemic.

Paulo signed a two-year contract with Sporting CP on 7 June 2020, being assigned to their reserves also in the third division. Third choice at the first team behind Antonio Adán and Luís Maximiano, he played his first match in the Primeira Liga on 19 May 2021 which was the last of the campaign, replacing Maximiano in the 66th minute of the 5–1 home win against Marítimo and thus being eligible for a winners' medal.

On 3 July 2023, Paulo joined Liga Portugal 2 club Mafra as a free agent. In July 2025, after spending the second part of the season in the Liga 3 with Oliveira do Hospital, he returned to the top flight on a deal at Alverca.

== Honours ==
Casa Pia

- Campeonato de Portugal: 2018–19

Sporting CP

- Primeira Liga: 2020–21
- Taça da Liga: 2020–21
