= Pedro Porro =

Spanish footballer (born 1999)

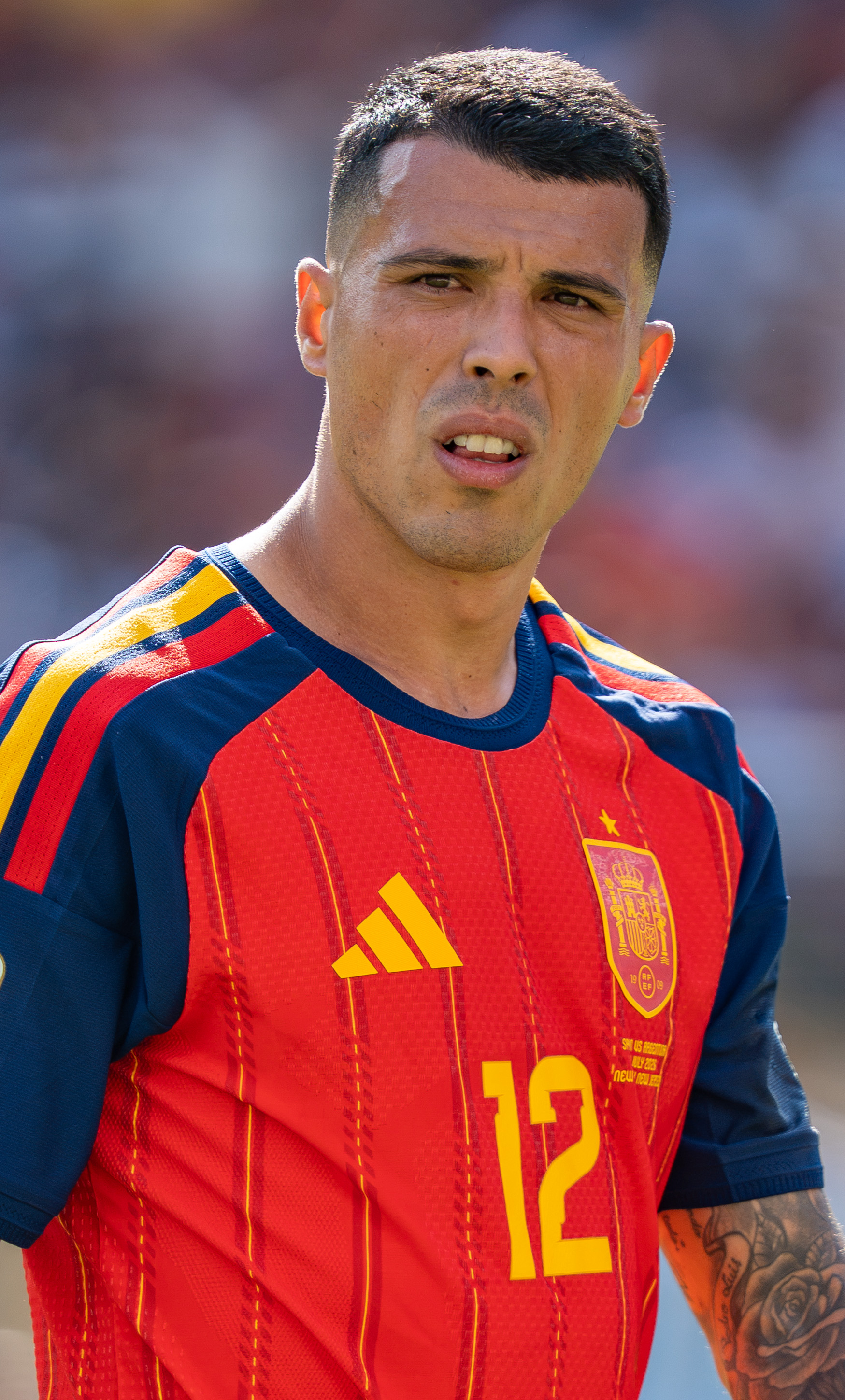
- Porro with Spain in 2026

Personal information
- Full name: Pedro Antonio Porro Sauceda
- Date of birth: 13 September 1999 (age 27)
- Place of birth: Don Benito, Spain
- Height: 1.73 m (5 ft 8 in)
- Position: Right-back

Team information
- Current team: Tottenham Hotspur
- Number: 23

Youth career
- 2008–2015: Gimnástico Don Benito
- 2015–2017: Rayo Vallecano

Senior career*
Years	Team	Apps	(Gls)
2017–2018	Peralada-Girona B	5	(3)
2017–2019	Girona	32	(0)
2019–2022	Manchester City	0	(0)
2019–2020	→ Valladolid (loan)	14	(0)
2020–2022	→ Sporting CP (loan)	53	(7)
2022–2023	Sporting CP	14	(2)
2023	→ Tottenham Hotspur (loan)	15	(3)
2023–	Tottenham Hotspur	109	(6)

International career^{‡}
2019–2020	Spain U21	7	(0)
2021–	Spain	26	(2)
Medal record
Men's football
Representing Spain
FIFA World Cup
Winner	2026 Canada–Mexico–US
UEFA Nations League
Runner-up	2021 Italy
Runner-up	2025 Germany
- * Club domestic league appearances and goals as of 23:02, 21 November 2026 (UTC) ‡ National team caps and goals as of 22:10, 15 November 2026 (UTC)

Pedro Antonio Porro Sauceda (Spanish pronunciation: [peðɾo ˈporo]; born 13 September 1999) is a Spanish professional footballer who plays as a right-back for Premier League club Tottenham Hotspur and the Spain national team.

Porro started his career with Girona's reserve team Peralada, before being promoted to the first team in 2017. In 2019, he signed for Premier League club Manchester City, but had successive loans to Real Valladolid and then Sporting CP, who later signed him permanently. With Sporting, he won the Primeira Liga title and two Taças da Liga titles, while being named in the Primeira Liga Team of the Year. In January 2023, Porro joined Tottenham Hotspur for €45 million, and went on to win the UEFA Europa League title, ending a 17-year trophy drought for them in the process.

Porro first appeared with the Spain under-21s in March 2019, aged 19. He made his senior international debut in 2021 and later represented the side at 2021 and 2025 UEFA Nations League Finals, where Spain finished as runners-up and at the 2026 FIFA World Cup, won by Spain.

== Early life ==
Porro was born in Don Benito, a town in the Province of Badajoz, to father Luis and mother Eva. Due to his parents' busy work schedules, he was raised mostly by his grandparents. At the age of 14, he left his hometown to pursue football in Madrid.

== Club career ==
=== Early career ===
Porro represented Gimnástico de Don Benito and Rayo Vallecano before joining Girona on 10 August 2017. He reportedly rejected Real Madrid, Atlético Madrid and Bayern Munich to sign for the Catalans.

=== Girona ===
On 28 November 2017, before even appearing with the reserves, Porro made his first team debut by coming on as a late substitute for goalscorer Johan Mojica in a 1–1 away draw against Levante, for the season's Copa del Rey. He made his first appearance for the B-side five days later, playing the last seven minutes in a 0–0 Segunda División B draw at Ebro.

Porro scored his first senior goals on 6 May 2018, scoring twice in a 3–0 away win against Villarreal B. On 2 July, he renewed his contract until 2022, and played most of the pre-season as a right back. Porro made his La Liga debut on 17 August 2018, starting as right back in a 0–0 home draw against Real Valladolid. The following day, he extended his contract for a further year.

Porro established himself as a starter under Eusebio Sacristán, becoming first choice ahead of Aday Benítez and replacing departed Pablo Maffeo. He scored his first professional goal on 31 January 2019, his team's only goal in a 1–3 cup loss at Real Madrid.

=== Manchester City ===
On 8 August 2019, Porro signed for Manchester City, for a reported fee of £11 million.

==== Loan to Real Valladolid ====
Upon signing for Manchester City, Porro was immediately loaned to Real Valladolid in La Liga for one season. The club had an option to make a permanent move, and after playing 13 league games, helping the Pucelanos to a 13th place finish, Valladolid opted to not exercise their option to sign Porro on a permanent basis.

=== Sporting CP ===
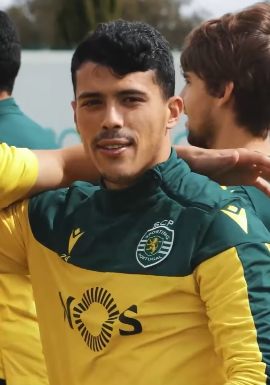
Porro with Sporting CP in 2021

On 16 August 2020, Porro joined Sporting CP on a two-year loan deal until 30 June 2022 with the option of making the move permanent for €8.5 million (£7 million).

On 24 September 2020, he made his debut for the club in a 1–0 home win against Aberdeen in the third qualifying round of the UEFA Europa League. Porro made his league debut in a 2–0 away victory against Paços de Ferreira, and scored his first goal for the Leões on 1 November in a 4–0 victory against Tondela. Porro was named the Primeira Liga's Defender of the Month for three consecutive months, between November and January 2021. On 23 January, Porro scored the only goal in the defeat of Braga to help his club win the Taça da Liga. Three days later, Porro scored a shot outside the box, in a 2–0 away victory against Boavista. His strike was later voted as the Primeira Liga's Goal of the Month. He played 30 games for the eventual champions, ending a 19-year drought, while also being named in the Team of the Year.

At the beginning of the following season, Porro provided an assist for Nuno Santos in a 1–1 home draw against Sporting's rivals Porto, and scored two goals from the penalty spot in two consecutive league games – in a 1–0 victory against Estoril on 19 September and a 1–0 victory against Marítimo on 24 September – which earned him the Primeira Liga's Defender of the Month award for two consecutive months in August and September. On 24 November, Porro scored the third goal against Borussia Dortmund in a 3–1 home victory at a group stage match of the 2021–22 UEFA Champions League to ensure his team qualification to the round of sixteen, for the first time since the 2008–09 season. Shortly afterwards, Porro began suffering from recurring hamstring injuries, which sidelined him for two months of the season. He made his return from injury on 29 January 2022, with his assist to Pablo Sarabia helping his team come from behind to defeat crosstown rivals Benfica 2–1 in the 2021–22 Taça da Liga final.

On 16 May 2022, Sporting triggered Porro's buyout clause of €8.5m (£7.2m) million, signing him on a permanent three-year deal with a reported €20m (£17.6m) million buy-back clause. Following a season in which he helped Sporting to a runner-up finish behind rivals Porto, scoring five goals and providing seven assists, he was named in the Team of the Year for a second consecutive season.

=== Tottenham Hotspur ===
2022-23

On 31 January 2023, the deadline day of the transfer window, Premier League club Tottenham Hotspur announced the signing of Porro on loan from Sporting for a loan fee of €5 million, with an obligation to buy in the summer for €40 million. In return, Sporting also received 15% of Marcus Edwards' economic rights.

Porro made his Spurs debut on 11 February, starting in a 4–1 defeat to Leicester City. His performance drew criticism from former Spurs manager Tim Sherwood, who described Porro as "so bad it's unbelievable."

He scored his first goal for the club on 18 March 2023 in a 3–3 away draw at Southampton. On 27 April, Porro scored the first goal in a 2-2 comeback against Manchester United, his first home goal. On 28 May, Porro scored and assisted as Tottenham beat Leeds United 4-1 on the final day, relegating them.

2023-24

On 19 August, Porro made his first start of the season in a 2-0 win over Manchester United. On 30 September, Joël Matip's clearance found the back of his own net from a Porro cross as Tottenham took all 3 points in stoppage time against a nine-man Liverpool.

On 5 January 2024, Porro scored the only goal in a 1–0 victory against Burnley in the FA Cup third round. On 11 May, Porro scored the equaliser in a 2-1 win over Burnley, the loss seeing them relegated. on 19 May, Porro scored in a 3-0 win over Sheffield United securing a UEFA Europa League place.

2024-25

On 19 August, Porro scored the opener against Leicester City in a 1-1 draw in the first game of the season. On 23 November, Porro came back to haunt his old club Manchester City, scoring in a 4-0 win at the Etihad Stadium, a result which ended a 52-match unbeaten run at home, giving Pep Guardiola his biggest ever home defeat and Manchester City's worst home defeat in over 20 years.

On 10 April, Porro scored a back-heel equaliser in the 2024-25 UEFA Europa League quarter-final against Eintracht Frankfurt. Tottenham drew the first leg 1-1 and won the second 1-0 sending them to the semi-final.

On 1 May, Porro assisted James Maddison as Tottenham won the first-leg 3-1 against FK Bodø/Glimt in the UEFA Europa League semi-final. A week later, Porro scored the final goal in a 2–0 second-leg victory against Bodø/Glimt in the UEFA Europa League semi-final to secure a 5–1 aggregate victory, sending Tottenham into the final.

On 21 May, Tottenham won 1–0 against Manchester United in the 2025 UEFA Europa League final winning their first trophy in 17 years and first European trophy in 41 years. Porro was named in the Europa League Team of the Season.

2025-26

On 13 August 2025, Tottenham played against Paris Saint-Germain in the 2025 UEFA Super Cup, Porro registered an assist and scored in the penalty-shootout as Tottenham were beaten 4-3 on penalties after drawing 2-2.

On 10 March 2026, Porro scored his first UEFA Champions League goal for Tottenham in the 5-2 round of 16 defeat against Atlético Madrid, also assisting the other goal.

On 18 April, Porro scored the opener against Brighton & Hove Albion in a 2-2 draw, the first goal of the Roberto De Zerbi era.

On 14 June 2026, Porro signed a new multi-year contract with the club.

== International career ==
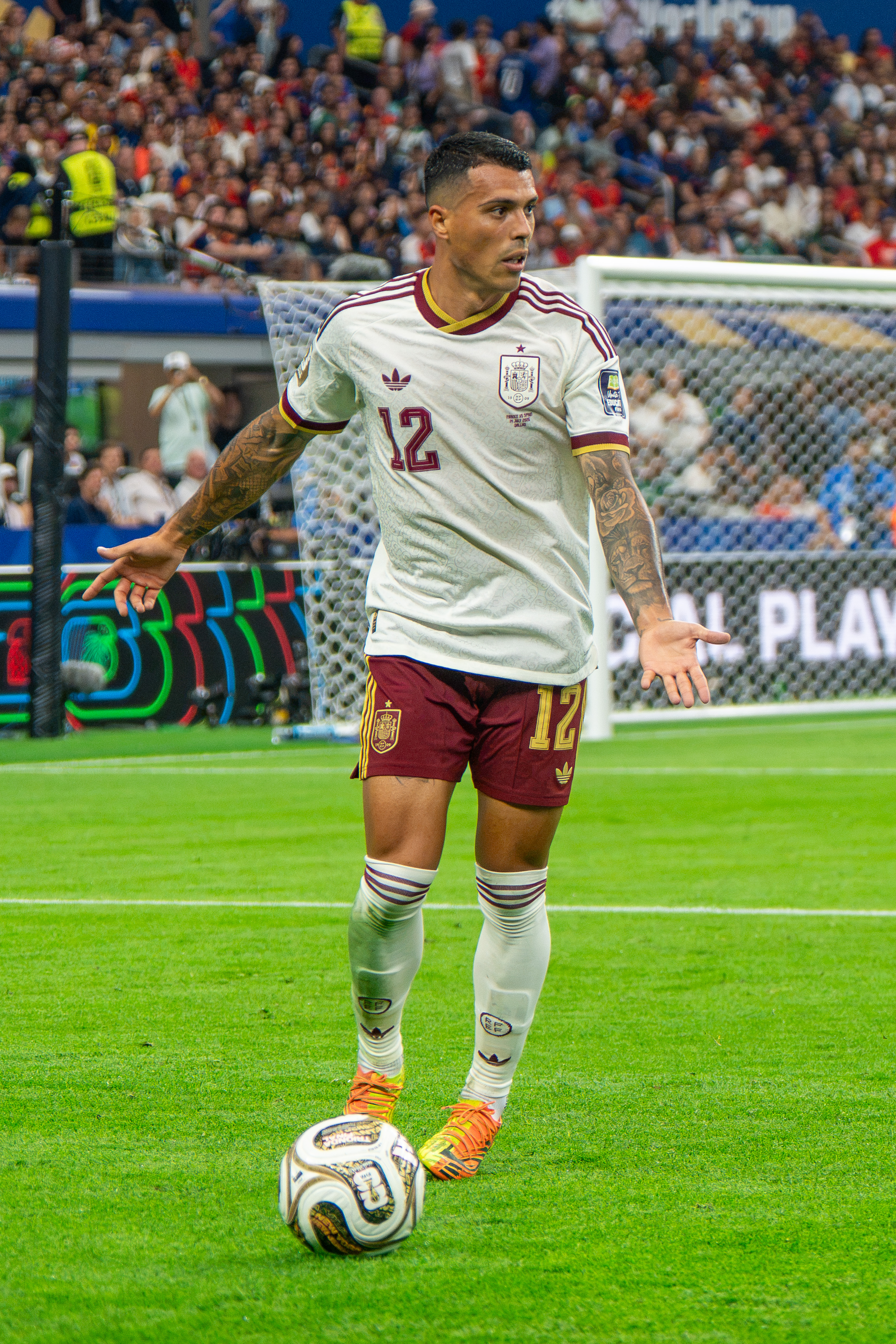
Pedro Porro with Spain at the 2026 FIFA World Cup

In March 2019, Porro received his first call-up for Spain at the under-21 level, making his debut on 29 March in a 1–0 friendly victory against Romania. In March 2021, he received his first call-up to the Spain national football team for the group stage of the 2022 FIFA World Cup qualification. He made his debut on 28 March 2021 in a 2–1 victory against Georgia.

On 25 May 2026, Porro was named in Spain’s squad for the 2026 FIFA World Cup. He made his World Cup debut in the group stage match against Saudi Arabia, which Spain won 4–0. He was again named to the starting lineup in the Round of 32 match against Austria, scoring his first international goal in a 3–0 victory. In the semi-final against France, he was named Man of the Match after scoring the second goal in a 2–0 victory, securing his nation's place in the World Cup final. On 19 July, Porro played the full match as Spain beat Argentina 1–0 after extra time, providing the cross that led to Ferran Torres' winning goal.

== Personal life ==
Porro has a son with his partner, María Hurtado, born in September 2025. Hurtado also has a daughter, Carla, from a previous relationship. Porro helps raise her as part of their family, and she often appears alongside them in their family photos and posts.

== Career statistics ==
=== Club ===
As of match played 21 November 2026

Appearances and goals by club, season and competition
Club	Season	League			National cup (Note: Includes Copa del Rey, Taça de Portugal, FA Cup)		League cup (Note: Includes Taça da Liga, EFL Cup)		Europe		Other		Total	
Club	Season	Division	Apps	Goals	Apps	Goals	Apps	Goals	Apps	Goals	Apps	Goals	Apps	Goals
Peralada-Girona B	2017–18	Segunda División B	5	3	—		—		—		—		5	3
Girona	2017–18	La Liga	0	0	1	0	—		—		—		1	0
Girona	2018–19	La Liga	32	0	2	1	—		—		—		34	1
Girona	Total		32	0	3	1	—		—		—		35	1
Valladolid (loan)	2019–20	La Liga	13	0	2	0	—		—		—		15	0
Sporting CP (loan)	2020–21	Primeira Liga	30	3	2	0	3	1	2 (Note: Appearances in UEFA Europa League)	0	—		37	4
Sporting CP (loan)	2021–22	Primeira Liga	23	4	4	0	1	0	7 (Note: Appearance(s) in UEFA Champions League)	1	0	0	35	5
Sporting CP	2022–23	Primeira Liga	14	2	1	0	6	1	5	0	—		26	3
Sporting CP	Sporting total		67	9	7	0	10	2	14	1	0	0	98	12
Tottenham Hotspur (loan)	2022–23	Premier League	15	3	1	0	—		1	0	—		17	3
Tottenham Hotspur	2023–24	Premier League	35	3	2	1	0	0	—		—		37	4
Tottenham Hotspur	2024–25	Premier League	33	2	2	0	3	0	13	2	—		51	4
Tottenham Hotspur	2025–26	Premier League	34	1	1	0	2	0	9	1	1 (Note: Appearance in UEFA Super Cup)	0	47	2
Tottenham Hotspur	2026–27	Premier League	7	0	0	0	1	0	—		—		8	0
Tottenham Hotspur	Tottenham total		124	9	6	1	6	0	23	3	1	0	160	13
Career total			241	21	18	2	16	2	37	4	1	0	313	29

=== International ===
As of match played 15 November 2026

Appearances and goals by national team and year
National team	Year	Apps	Goals
Spain	2021	1	0
Spain	2022	0	0
Spain	2023	1	0
Spain	2024	4	0
Spain	2025	9	0
Spain	2026	11	2
Total		26	2

Spain score listed first, score column indicates score after each Porro goal.

List of international goals scored by Pedro Porro
No.	Date	Venue	Cap	Opponent	Score	Result	Competition
1	2 July 2026	SoFi Stadium, Inglewood, United States	20	Austria	2–0	3–0	2026 FIFA World Cup
2	14 July 2026	AT&T Stadium, Arlington, United States	23	France	2–0	2–0	2026 FIFA World Cup

== Honours ==
Porro after winning the 2026 FIFA World Cup Final

Sporting CP

- Primeira Liga: 2020–21
- Taça da Liga: 2020–21, 2021–22

Tottenham Hotspur

- UEFA Europa League: 2024–25

Spain

- FIFA World Cup: 2026
- UEFA Nations League runner-up: 2020–21, 2024–25

Individual

- Primeira Liga Defender of the Month: November 2020, December 2020, January 2021, September 2021
- Primeira Liga Goal of the Month: January 2021
- Primeira Liga Team of the Year: 2020–21, 2021–22
- UEFA Europa League Team of the Season: 2024–25
- FIFA World Cup Dream XI: 2026
