= Luís Maximiano =

Portuguese footballer (born 1999)

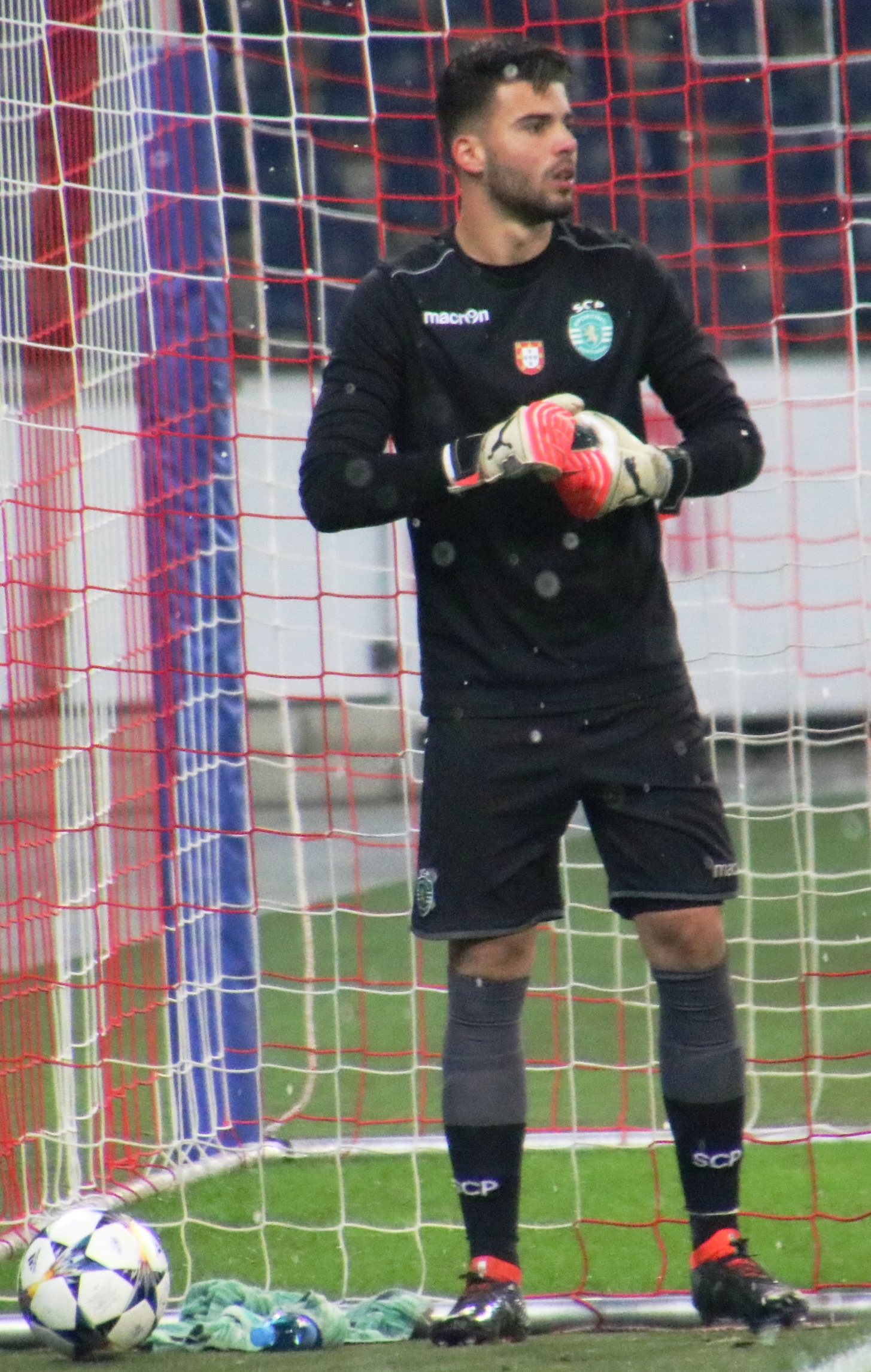
- Maximiano with Sporting CP youth in 2018

Personal information
- Full name: Luís Manuel Arantes Maximiano
- Date of birth: 5 January 1999 (age 27)
- Place of birth: Celeirós, Portugal
- Height: 1.90 m (6 ft 3 in)
- Position: Goalkeeper

Team information
- Current team: Neom
- Number: 81

Youth career
- 2008–2009: Celeirós
- 2009–2010: Ferreirense
- 2010–2012: Braga
- 2012–2017: Sporting CP

Senior career*
Years	Team	Apps	(Gls)
2017–2018	Sporting CP B	6	(0)
2018–2021	Sporting CP	25	(0)
2021–2022	Granada	35	(0)
2022–2024	Lazio	1	(0)
2023–2024	→ Almería (loan)	33	(0)
2024–2025	Almería	28	(0)
2025–	Neom	30	(0)

International career
2015	Portugal U16	2	(0)
2015–2016	Portugal U17	3	(0)
2017	Portugal U18	3	(0)
2016–2018	Portugal U19	5	(0)
2017–2019	Portugal U20	9	(0)
2019–2020	Portugal U21	2	(0)
Medal record
Men's football
Representing Portugal
UEFA European Under-21 Championship
Runner-up	2021 Hungary–Slovenia
UEFA European Under-17 Championship
Winner	2016 Azerbaijan
- * Club domestic league appearances and goals as of 5 November 2026

Luís Manuel Arantes Maximiano (born 5 January 1999) is a Portuguese professional footballer who plays as a goalkeeper for Saudi Pro League club Neom.

Developed at Sporting CP, where he made 36 first-team appearances, he went on to play in La Liga for Granada and Almería and for Lazio in Serie A.

== Club career ==
=== Sporting CP ===
Born in Celeirós, Aveleda e Vimieiro, Braga District, Maximiano joined Sporting CP's youth system at the age of 13, from Braga. He made his senior debut in the LigaPro with the former's reserves on 25 October 2017, in a 1–1 away draw against Nacional. He also began training with the first team, acting as third choice behind Rui Patrício and Romain Salin.

Maximiano played his first competitive match with the main squad on 26 September 2019, in a 1–2 home loss to Rio Ave in the group stage of the Taça da Liga. His maiden appearance in the UEFA Europa League took place two months and two days later (same phase), as he played the entire 4–0 victory over PSV Eindhoven also at the Estádio José Alvalade. On 1 December he made his Primeira Liga bow in a 3–1 defeat at Gil Vicente, and eventually became first choice ahead of Brazilian Renan Ribeiro.

At the start of the 2020–21 season, Maximiano's starting role was taken by incoming Spaniard Antonio Adán.

=== Granada ===
On 15 August 2021, Maximiano signed a four-year contract with Spanish club Granada, for a €4.5 million fee. He made his debut in La Liga on 13 September in a 2–1 home loss to Real Betis, with his compatriot and predecessor Rui Silva in the opposite net.

Maximiano only missed three games in his only season – making a league-best 127 saves in the process – but the Andalusians returned to Segunda División after three years.

=== Lazio ===
On 13 July 2022, Maximiano joined Lazio. He made his Serie A debut in the campaign opener on 14 August, being sent off in the sixth minute of the home fixture against Bologna for handling the ball just outside the penalty area as the hosts eventually won 2–1.

Maximiano lost his place to fellow new arrival Ivan Provedel and did not play again until 19 January 2023, a 2–0 win over the same opponents in the round of 16 of the Coppa Italia also at the Stadio Olimpico.

=== Almería ===
Maximiano returned to Spain and its top tier in August 2023, joining Almería on loan for the season. He totalled 34 appearances in his first year, suffering relegation as second-bottom.

On 2 July 2024, Maximiano signed a permanent five-year contract for an €8 million fee.

=== Neom ===
On 11 September 2025, Maximiano moved to Neom, newcomers to the Saudi Pro League. He agreed to a four-year deal.

== International career ==
Maximiano won his first cap for the Portugal under-21 side on 14 November 2019, featuring 45 minutes in the 0–0 friendly draw with Slovenia.

== Career statistics ==
As of match played 1 June 2025

Appearances and goals by club, season and competition
Club	Season	League			National Cup		League Cup		Europe		Other		Total	
Club	Season	Division	Apps	Goals	Apps	Goals	Apps	Goals	Apps	Goals	Apps	Goals	Apps	Goals
Sporting CP B	2016–17	LigaPro	0	0	—		—		—		—		0	0
Sporting CP B	2017–18	LigaPro	6	0	—		—		—		—		6	0
Sporting CP B	Total		6	0	—		—		—		—		6	0
Sporting CP	2018–19	Primeira Liga	0	0	0	0	0	0	0	0	—		0	0
Sporting CP	2019–20	Primeira Liga	23	0	1	0	3	0	4 (Note: Appearances in UEFA Europa League)	0	—		31	0
Sporting CP	2020–21	Primeira Liga	2	0	2	0	1	0	0	0	—		5	0
Sporting CP	2021–22	Primeira Liga	0	0	—		—		—		0	0	0	0
Sporting CP	Total		25	0	3	0	4	0	4	0	0	0	36	0
Granada	2021–22	La Liga	35	0	0	0	—		—		—		35	0
Lazio	2022–23	Serie A	1	0	2	0	—		3 (Note: Appearances in UEFA Europa Conference League)	0	—		6	0
Almería (loan)	2023–24	La Liga	33	0	1	0	—		—		—		34	0
Almería	2024–25	Segunda División	28	0	2	0	—		—		0	0	30	0
Career total			128	0	8	0	4	0	7	0	0	0	147	0

== Honours ==
Sporting CP

- Primeira Liga: 2020–21
- Taça da Liga: 2020–21
- Supertaça Cândido de Oliveira: 2021
