= 2022–23 Fulham F.C. season =

Fulham
2022–23 season
- Chairman: Shahid Khan
- Head coach: Marco Silva
- Stadium: Craven Cottage
- Premier League: 10th
- FA Cup: Quarter-finals
- EFL Cup: Second round
- Top goalscorer: League: Aleksandar Mitrović (14); All: Aleksandar Mitrović (15)
- Highest home attendance: 24,498 vs Manchester City (30 April 2023, Premier League)
- Lowest home attendance: 21,798 vs Brentford (20 August 2022, Premier League)
- Average home league attendance: 23,267
- Biggest win: 3–0 vs Aston Villa (20 October 2022, Premier League); 3–0 vs Crystal Palace (26 December 2022, Premier League)
- Biggest defeat: 1–4 vs Newcastle United (1 October 2022, Premier League); 0–3 vs Arsenal (12 March 2023, Premier League)
| Home colours | Away colours | Third colours |

The 2022–23 season marked the 125th season for Fulham Football Club since it turned professional. It was the club's first campaign back in the Premier League since the 2020–21 season, following their promotion from the previous season. In addition to the league, they also competed in the FA Cup and the EFL Cup.

== Transfers ==
=== In ===
| Date | Position | Nationality | Player | From | Fee | Ref. |
|---|---|---|---|---|---|---|
| 4 July 2022 | DM | (Portugal) | João Palhinha | (Portugal) Sporting CP | Undisclosed (Note: Fee reported as £17,000,000) | |
| 5 July 2022 | RW | (England) | Tom Olyott | (England) Manchester City | Free transfer | |
| 5 July 2022 | CB | (England) | Damon Park | (England) Oldham Athletic | Free transfer | |
| 5 July 2022 | AM | (Switzerland) | Kristian Šekularac | (Italy) Juventus | Free transfer | |
| 9 July 2022 | FW | (England) | Callum McFarlane | (England) Bradfield College | Free transfer | |
| 11 July 2022 | AM | (Brazil) | Andreas Pereira | (England) Manchester United | Undisclosed | |
| 27 July 2022 | RB | (Switzerland) | Kevin Mbabu | (Germany) Wolfsburg | Undisclosed | |
| 2 August 2022 | GK | (Germany) | Bernd Leno | (England) Arsenal | Undisclosed | |
| 10 August 2022 | CB | (France) | Issa Diop | (England) West Ham United | Undisclosed | |
| 1 September 2022 | CF | (Brazil) | Carlos Vinícius | (Portugal) Benfica | Undisclosed | |
| 1 September 2022 | LW | (Brazil) | Willian | (Brazil) Corinthians | Free Transfer | |
| 31 January 2023 | CB | (Republic of Ireland) | Shane Duffy | (England) Brighton & Hove Albion | Undisclosed | |
| 31 January 2023 | CM | (Serbia) | Saša Lukić | (Italy) Torino | Undisclosed | |

=== Out ===
| Date | Position | Player | To | Fee | Ref. |
|---|---|---|---|---|---|
| 30 June 2022 | CF | (England) Timmy Abraham | (England) Walsall | Released | |
| 30 June 2022 | GK | (England) Jacob Adams | (England) Hayes & Yeading United | Released | |
| 30 June 2022 | CB | (United States) Eric Ameyaw | Unattached | Released | |
| 30 June 2022 | RB | (England) Xavier Benjamin | (Wales) Cardiff City | Released | |
| 30 June 2022 | AM | (Portugal) Fábio Carvalho | (England) Liverpool | £5,000,000 (Note: plus £2,700,000 in add-ons) | |
| 30 June 2022 | CM | (England) Tyler Caton | (England) Corinthian-Casuals | Released | |
| 30 June 2022 | RB | (Republic of Ireland) Cyrus Christie | (England) Hull City | Released | |
| 30 June 2022 | GK | (Spain) Fabri | Unattached | Released | |
| 30 June 2022 | CB | (Jamaica) Michael Hector | (England) Charlton Athletic | Released | |
| 30 June 2022 | CB | (England) Alfie Mawson | (England) Wycombe Wanderers | Released | |
| 30 June 2022 | CB | (England) Jerome Opoku | (Portugal) Arouca | Released | |
| 30 June 2022 | DM | (England) Jonathon Page | Unattached | Released | |
| 30 June 2022 | GK | (Australia) Julian Schwarzer | (Philippines) Azkals Development Team | Released | |
| 30 June 2022 | DM | (Ivory Coast) Jean Michaël Seri | (England) Hull City | Released | |
| 30 June 2022 | LW | (England) Jaylan Wildbore | Unattached | Released | |
| 1 July 2022 (Note: The transfer was announced on 26 May, and would become official on 1 July once the transfer window opened) | DM | (Cameroon) André-Frank Zambo Anguissa | (Italy) Napoli | Undisclosed | |
| 29 July 2022 | RW | (England) Michael Olakigbe | (England) Brentford | Undisclosed | |
| 6 September 2022 | RB | (United States) Marlon Fossey | (Belgium) Standard Liège | Undisclosed | |
| 31 January 2023 | DM | (England) Nathaniel Chalobah | (England) West Bromwich Albion | Undisclosed | |
| 31 January 2023 | CM | (England) Josh Onomah | (England) Preston North End | Mutual Consent | |

=== Loans in ===
| Date | Position | Nationality | Name | From | On loan until | Ref. |
|---|---|---|---|---|---|---|
| 25 July 2022 | LW | (Israel) | Manor Solomon | (Ukraine) Shakhtar Donetsk | End of Season | |
| 5 August 2022 | CB | (Republic of Ireland) | Shane Duffy | (England) Brighton & Hove Albion | 31 January 2023 (Note: On 31 January, Duffy joined the club permanently) | |
| 1 September 2022 | FW | (Wales) | Daniel James | (England) Leeds United | End of Season | |
| 1 September 2022 | LB | (France) | Layvin Kurzawa | (France) Paris Saint-Germain | End of Season | |
| 1 February 2023 | RB | (Portugal) | Cédric Soares | (England) Arsenal | End of Season | |

=== Loans out ===
| Date | Position | Nationality | Player | To | On loan until | Ref. |
|---|---|---|---|---|---|---|
| 22 June 2022 | AM | (England) | Sonny Hilton | (England) Carlisle United | 4 January 2023 (Note: On 4 January, Hilton was recalled from his season-long loan at Carlisle) | |
| 23 June 2022 | GK | (England) | Taye Ashby-Hammond | (England) Stevenage | End of Season | |
| 5 July 2022 | RB | (England) | Steven Sessegnon | (England) Charlton Athletic | End of Season | |
| 12 July 2022 | CF | (Scotland) | Kieron Bowie | (England) Northampton Town | End of Season | |
| 14 July 2022 | GK | (England) | Luca Ashby-Hammond | (England) Aldershot Town | End of Season | |
| 2 August 2022 | DM | (England) | Jonathon Page | (England) Farnborough | End of Season | |
| 6 August 2022 | CF | (France) | Jean-Pierre Tiéhi | (Scotland) Hamilton Academical | End of Season | |
| 21 August 2022 | CF | (Brazil) | Rodrigo Muniz | (England) Middlesbrough | End of Season | |
| 30 August 2022 | CB | (England) | Idris Odutayo | (England) Maidenhead United | End of Season (Note: On 7 January, Odutayo's loan at Maidenhead United, which was initially until 2 January, was extended until end of the season) | |
| 31 August 2022 | LB | (England) | Joe Bryan | (France) Nice | End of Season | |
| 1 September 2022 | GK | (Argentina) | Paulo Gazzaniga | (Spain) Girona | End of Season | |
| 1 September 2022 | LW | (Bulgaria) | Sylvester Jasper | (England) Bristol Rovers | End of Season | |
| 1 September 2022 | CB | (Netherlands) | Terence Kongolo | (France) Le Havre | End of Season | |
| 2 September 2022 | CM | (Australia) | Tyrese Francois | (Croatia) Gorica | 3 February 2023 (Note: On 3 February, Francois was recalled from his season-long loan at Gorica) | |
| 2 September 2022 | CF | (England) | Jay Stansfield | (England) Exeter City | End of Season | |
| 3 September 2022 | CM | (England) | Imani Lanquedoc | (England) Basingstoke Town | 1 January 2023 | |
| 7 September 2022 | LW | (Portugal) | Ivan Cavaleiro | (Turkey) Alanyaspor | End of Season | |
| 10 September 2022 | RW | (France) | Anthony Knockaert | (Greece) Volos | 10 January 2023 (Note: On 10 January, Knockaert was recalled from his season-long loan at Volos and was subsequently loaned to Huddersfield) | |
| 12 September 2022 | LB | (France) | Ziyad Larkeche | (England) Barnsley | End of Season | |
| 18 September 2022 | CM | (Cyprus) | Georgios Okkas | (England) Harrow Borough | 1 January 2023 | |
| 18 September 2022 | CF | (England) | Oliver Sanderson | (England) Oxford City | End of Season | |
| 18 September 2022 | RB | (Colombia) | Devan Tanton | (England) Walton & Hersham | 1 January 2023 | |
| 11 January 2023 | RW | (France) | Anthony Knockaert | (England) Huddersfield Town | End of Season | |
| 31 January 2023 | CB | (Scotland) | Connor McAvoy | (Scotland) Partick Thistle | 16 March 2023 (Note: On 16 March, McAvoy's loan, which was due to last until the end of the season, was ended early after he sustained a season-ending injury) | |
| 13 February 2023 | RB | (Switzerland) | Kevin Mbabu | (Switzerland) Servette | End of Season | |
| 16 February 2023 | LW | (Republic of Ireland) | Ollie O'Neill | (Northern Ireland) Derry City | 1 August 2023 | |
| 26 February 2023 | CM | (Albania) | Adrion Pajaziti (Note: On 2 August, Pajaziti's loan, which was due to last until the end of the Norwegian season in December 2023, was ended early) | (Norway) Haugesund | 2 August 2023 | |

== Pre-season and friendlies ==
On 27 May Fulham announced they would visit Portugal as part of pre-season preparations and participate in a mini-tournament at the Estádio Algarve on 16 and 17 July 2022. During the club's stay in Algarve they would compete in the Algarve Trophy tournament against Nice and Benfica. A third friendly match whilst in Portugal was confirmed against Estoril Praia. The final pre-season game of the schedule was scheduled to be at home against Villarreal.

During the 2022 FIFA World Cup winter break, Fulham confirmed a friendly against West Ham United.

Win Draw Loss Fixtures

| 16 July 2022 Algarve Cup | Nice | 0–2 (2–3 p) | Fulham | Faro/Loulé, Portugal |
| 20:15 WEST | | Report | Kebano 42' (pen.); Wilson 84' (pen.) | Stadium: Estádio Algarve; Referee: Hélder Carvalho (Portugal) |
| | Penalties |
| | Rosario (penalty missed); Bard (penalty scored); Mendy (penalty missed); Gouiri (penalty scored); Dante (penalty missed) | | (penalty scored) Wilson; (penalty scored) Pereira; (penalty scored) Tiéhi; (penalty missed) Bryan; (penalty missed) Jasper |
Note: A penalty shoot-out was held after the match in case the competition needed a tiebreaker.

| 17 July 2022 Algarve Cup | Benfica | 5–1 | Fulham | Faro/Loulé, Portugal |
| 20:15 WEST | R. Silva 3'; Ramos 21', 29'; Yaremchuk 57'; Araújo 64' | Report | Mitrović 61'; Ream (yellow card) 69'; Pereira (yellow card) 88' | Stadium: Estádio Algarve; Attendance: 13,000; Referee: Nuno Almeida (Portugal) |

| 24 July 2022 Friendly | Estoril Praia | 1–3 | Fulham | Alcabideche, Portugal |
| 17:45 WEST | Franco 34' (pen.) | Report | Mitrović 7', 11'; Palhinha 24' | Stadium: Estádio António Coimbra da Mota |

| 31 July 2022 Friendly | Fulham | 1–1 | Villarreal | Fulham |
| 15:00 BST | Kebano (yellow card) 57'; Mitrović (yellow card) 66', (goal) 86' | Report | Foyth (yellow card) 15'; Parejo 34'; Albiol (yellow card) 80' | Stadium: Craven Cottage; Referee: John Brooks (England) |

| 17 December 2022 Friendly | Fulham | 1–1 | West Ham United | Fulham |
| 13:00 GMT | Carlos Vinícius 43' | Report | Bowen 62' | Stadium: Craven Cottage; Referee: John Brooks |

== Competitions ==
=== Overall record ===
| Competition | First match | Last match | Starting round | Final position | Record | | | | | | | |
| Competition | First match | Last match | Starting round | Final position | Pld | W | D | L | GF | GA | GD | Win % |
|---|---|---|---|---|---|---|---|---|---|---|---|---|
| Premier League | 6 August 2022 | 28 May 2023 | Matchday 1 | 10th | 38 | 15 | 7 | 16 | 55 | 53 | +2 | 39.47 |
| FA Cup | 7 January 2023 | 19 March 2023 | Third round | Quarter-finals | 5 | 3 | 1 | 1 | 9 | 6 | +3 | 60.00 |
| EFL Cup | 23 August 2022 | | Second round | Second round | 1 | 0 | 0 | 1 | 0 | 2 | −2 | 0.00 |
| Total | | | | | 44 | 18 | 8 | 18 | 64 | 61 | +3 | 40.91 |

Source: Soccerway

=== Premier League ===
==== League table ====
| Pos | Team | Pld | W | D | L | GF | GA | GD | Pts |
|---|---|---|---|---|---|---|---|---|---|
| 8 | Tottenham Hotspur | 38 | 18 | 6 | 14 | 70 | 63 | +7 | 60 |
| 9 | Brentford | 38 | 15 | 14 | 9 | 58 | 46 | +12 | 59 |
| 10 | Fulham | 38 | 15 | 7 | 16 | 55 | 53 | +2 | 52 |
| 11 | Crystal Palace | 38 | 11 | 12 | 15 | 40 | 49 | −9 | 45 |
| 12 | Chelsea | 38 | 11 | 11 | 16 | 38 | 47 | −9 | 44 |

Source: Premier League
Rules for classification: 1) Points; 2) Goal difference; 3) Goals scored; 4) If the champions, relegated teams or qualified teams for UEFA competitions cannot be determined by rules 1 to 3, rules 4.1 to 4.3 are applied – 4.1) Points gained in head-to-head record between such teams; 4.2) Away goals scored in head-to-head record between such teams; 4.3) Play-offs

==== Results summary ====
| Overall | | | | | | | | Home | | | | | | Away | | | | | |
| Pld | W | D | L | GF | GA | GD | Pts | W | D | L | GF | GA | GD | W | D | L | GF | GA | GD |
|---|---|---|---|---|---|---|---|---|---|---|---|---|---|---|---|---|---|---|---|
| 38 | 15 | 7 | 16 | 55 | 53 | +2 | 52 | 8 | 5 | 6 | 31 | 29 | +2 | 7 | 2 | 10 | 24 | 24 | 0 |

Source: Premier League

==== Results by round ====
| Round | 1 | 2 | 3 | 4 | 5 | 6 | 7 | 8 | 9 | 10 | 11 | 12 | 13 | 14 | 15 | 16 | 17 | 18 | 19 | 20 | 21 | 22 | 23 | 24 | 25 | 26 | 27 | 28 | 29 | 30 | 31 | 32 | 33 | 34 | 35 | 36 | 37 | 38 |
|---|---|---|---|---|---|---|---|---|---|---|---|---|---|---|---|---|---|---|---|---|---|---|---|---|---|---|---|---|---|---|---|---|---|---|---|---|---|---|
| Ground | H | A | H | A | H | A | H | A | H | A | H | H | A | H | A | H | A | H | A | A | H | A | H | A | H | A | H | A | A | H | A | H | A | H | H | A | H | A |
| Result | D | D | W | L | W | L | W | W | L | L | D | W | W | D | L | L | W | W | W | L | L | D | W | W | D | L | L | L | L | L | W | W | L | L | W | W | D | L |
| Position | 10 | 13 | 7 | 11 | 8 | 10 | 10 | 6 | 8 | 9 | 9 | 9 | 7 | 7 | 9 | 9 | 9 | 7 | 7 | 6 | 7 | 8 | 7 | 6 | 6 | 7 | 8 | 9 | 10 | 10 | 10 | 9 | 10 | 10 | 10 | 10 | 10 | 10 |

Source: Premier League
A = Away; H = Home; W = Win; D = Draw; L = Loss; P = Postponed

==== Matches ====
Win Draw Loss Fixtures

On 16 June, the Premier League fixtures were released.

| 6 August 2022 1 | Fulham | 2–2 | Liverpool | Fulham |
| 12:30 BST | Tete (yellow card) 17'; Mitrović 32', 72' (pen.); Decordova-Reid (yellow card) 90+1' | Report | Núñez 64'; Salah 80' | Stadium: Craven Cottage; Attendance: 22,207; Referee: Andrew Madley |

| 13 August 2022 2 | Wolverhampton Wanderers | 0–0 | Fulham | Wolverhampton |
| 15:00 BST | Podence (yellow card) 17'; Neves (yellow card) 36'; Gibbs-White (yellow card) 90+5' | Report | Palhinha (yellow card) 44'; Reed (yellow card) 50'; Mitrović (penalty missed) 81', (yellow card) 90+5' | Stadium: Molineux Stadium; Attendance: 31,178; Referee: John Brooks |

| 20 August 2022 3 | Fulham | 3–2 | Brentford | Fulham |
| 15:00 BST | Decordova-Reid 1'; Palhinha 20', (yellow card) 29'; Tete (yellow card) 31'; Mitrović 90'; Mbabu (yellow card) 90+4' | Report | Nørgaard 44'; Dasilva (yellow card) 56'; Toney 71'; Mee (yellow card) 80' | Stadium: Craven Cottage; Attendance: 21,798; Referee: Peter Bankes |

| 27 August 2022 4 | Arsenal | 2–1 | Fulham | Holloway |
| 17:30 BST | White (yellow card) 36'; Gabriel Jesus (yellow card) 45'; Ødegaard 64'; Gabriel 86' | Report | Palhinha (yellow card) 45'; Robinson (yellow card) 51'; Mitrović 56'; Decordova-Reid (yellow card) 70' | Stadium: Emirates Stadium; Attendance: 60,164; Referee: Jarred Gillett |

| 30 August 2022 5 | Fulham | 2–1 | Brighton & Hove Albion | Fulham |
| 19:30 BST | Mitrović 48'; Dunk 55' (o.g.); Robinson (yellow card) 68'; Reed (yellow card) 83' | Report | Estupiñán (yellow card) 55'; Mac Allister 60' (pen.) | Stadium: Craven Cottage; Attendance: 22,224; Referee: Thomas Bramall |

| 3 September 2022 6 | Tottenham Hotspur | 2–1 | Fulham | Tottenham |
| 15:00 BST | Romero (yellow card) 27'; Højbjerg 40'; Bentancur (yellow card) 69'; Kane 75'; Richarlison (yellow card) 90+1' | Report | Tete (yellow card) 36'; Decordova-Reid (yellow card) 55'; Palhinha (yellow card) 63'; Mitrović 83', (yellow card) 86' | Stadium: Tottenham Hotspur Stadium; Attendance: 61,641; Referee: Stuart Attwell |

| 16 September 2022 8 | Nottingham Forest | 2–3 | Fulham | West Bridgford |
| 20:00 BST | Awoniyi 11'; Cook (yellow card) 27'; Boly (yellow card) 34'; Diop (yellow card) 40'; O'Brien 77' | Report | Adarabioyo 54'; Palhinha 57', (yellow card) 58'; Reed 60'; Tete (yellow card) 63'; Pereira (yellow card) 79' | Stadium: The City Ground; Attendance: 28,654; Referee: Jarred Gillett |

| 1 October 2022 9 | Fulham | 1–4 | Newcastle United | Fulham |
| 15:00 BST | Chalobah (red card) 8'; Mitrović (yellow card) 12'; Reed (yellow card) 54'; Decordova-Reid 88' | Report | Wilson 11'; Almirón 33', 57'; Longstaff 43' | Stadium: Craven Cottage; Attendance: 22,913; Referee: Darren England |

| 9 October 2022 10 | West Ham United | 3–1 | Fulham | Stratford |
| 14:00 BST | Bowen 29' (pen.); Scamacca 62'; Kehrer (yellow card) 83'; Antonio 90+1' | Report | Pereira 5', (yellow card) 27'; Reed (yellow card) 58'; Carlos Vinícius (yellow card) 66' | Stadium: London Stadium; Attendance: 62,454; Referee: Chris Kavanagh |
Note: The match was originally scheduled for 8 October at 15:00 BST, but was rescheduled due to West Ham's participation in the UEFA Europa Conference League group stage.

| 15 October 2022 11 | Fulham | 2–2 | Bournemouth | Fulham |
| 15:00 BST | Diop 22'; Decordova-Reid (yellow card) 38'; Mitrović 52' (pen.); Ream (yellow card) 54' | Report | Solanke 2'; Lerma 29' | Stadium: Craven Cottage; Attendance: 22,913; Referee: Graham Scott |

| 20 October 2022 12 | Fulham | 3–0 | Aston Villa | Fulham |
| 19:30 BST | Reed 36'; Mitrović 68' (pen.); Mings 83' (o.g.) | Report | Bailey (yellow card) 57'; Mings (yellow card) 60'; Douglas Luiz (red card) 62' | Stadium: Craven Cottage; Attendance: 23,508; Referee: Michael Oliver |
Note: Douglas Luiz's red card was revoked by the FA the day after the match following an appeal.

| 23 October 2022 13 | Leeds United | 2–3 | Fulham | Leeds |
| 14:00 BST | Rodrigo 20'; Cooper (yellow card) 39'; Summerville 90+1' | Report | Mitrović 26'; Robinson (yellow card) 62'; Decordova-Reid 74'; Willian 84' | Stadium: Elland Road; Attendance: 36,447; Referee: Anthony Taylor |

| 29 October 2022 14 | Fulham | 0–0 | Everton | Fulham |
| 17:30 BST | Mitrović (yellow card) 24'; Decordova-Reid (yellow card) 58' | Report | Onana (yellow card) 64' | Stadium: Craven Cottage; Attendance: 23,534; Referee: John Brooks |

| 5 November 2022 15 | Manchester City | 2–1 | Fulham | Manchester |
| 15:00 GMT | Álvarez 17'; Cancelo (red card) 26'; Silva (yellow card) 45+3'; Haaland 90+5' (pen.), (yellow card) 90+7' | Report | Pereira (yellow card) 7', (goal) 28' (pen.); Reed (yellow card) 45'; Tete (yellow card) 63'; Robinson (yellow card) 90' | Stadium: City of Manchester Stadium; Attendance: 52,395; Referee: Darren England |

| 13 November 2022 16 | Fulham | 1–2 | Manchester United | Fulham |
| 16:30 GMT | Decordova-Reid (yellow card) 33'; James 62' | Report | Eriksen 14'; Garnacho 90+3', (yellow card) 90+4' | Stadium: Craven Cottage; Attendance: 24,246; Referee: Paul Tierney |

Mid-season break for 2022 FIFA World Cup

| 26 December 2022 17 | Crystal Palace | 0–3 | Fulham | Selhurst |
| 15:00 GMT | Mitchell (red card) 34'; Tomkins (yellow card) 20' (yellow-red card) 57' | Report | Decordova-Reid 31'; Ream 71'; Mitrović 80' | Stadium: Selhurst Park; Attendance: 25,176; Referee: Andrew Madley |

| 31 December 2022 18 | Fulham | 2–1 | Southampton | Fulham |
| 15:00 GMT | Ward-Prowse 32' (o.g.); Palhinha 88'; Mitrović (penalty missed) 90+6' | Report | Ward-Prowse 56'; Elyounoussi (yellow card) 70' | Stadium: Craven Cottage; Attendance: 24,344; Referee: Graham Scott |

| 3 January 2023 19 | Leicester City | 0–1 | Fulham | Leicester |
| 19:45 GMT | Ndidi (yellow card) 61'; Castagne (yellow card) 74' | Report | Mitrović 17', (yellow card) 78'; Adarabioyo (yellow card) 52'; Palhinha (yellow card) 60'; Cairney (yellow card) 62'; Tete (yellow card) 68'; Leno (yellow card) 90+6' | Stadium: King Power Stadium; Attendance: 30,813; Referee: Darren Bond |

| 12 January 2023 7 | Fulham | 2–1 | Chelsea | Fulham |
| 20:00 GMT | Robinson (yellow card) 9'; Pereira (yellow card) 14'; Willian 25'; Carlos Vinícius 73'; Adarabioyo (yellow card) 84' | Report | Chalobah (yellow card) 36'; Koulibaly 47'; Félix (red card) 58'; Hall (yellow card) 62'; Mount (yellow card) 76' | Stadium: Craven Cottage; Attendance: 24,460; Referee: David Coote |
Note: The match was originally scheduled for 10 September 2022, but was postponed as a mark of respect following the passing of Queen Elizabeth II.

| 15 January 2023 20 | Newcastle United | 1–0 | Fulham | Newcastle upon Tyne |
| 14:00 GMT | Pope (yellow card) 69'; Isak 89' | Report | Kurzawa (yellow card) 48'; Ream (yellow card) 60'; Pereira (yellow card) 63'; Mitrović (penalty missed) 69' | Stadium: St James' Park; Attendance: 52,247; Referee: Robert Jones |

| 23 January 2023 21 | Fulham | 0–1 | Tottenham Hotspur | Fulham |
| 20:15 GMT | Palhinha (yellow card) 17' | Report | Son (yellow card) 28'; Kane 45+1'; Romero (yellow card) 70'; Bentancur (yellow card) 78' | Stadium: Craven Cottage; Attendance: 24,190; Referee: Paul Tierney |

| 3 February 2023 22 | Chelsea | 0–0 | Fulham | Fulham |
| 20:00 GMT | Gallagher (yellow card) 64' | Report | Palhinha (yellow card) 22'; Pereira (yellow card) 51'; Decordova-Reid (yellow card) 67'; Wilson (yellow card) 90+3' | Stadium: Stamford Bridge; Attendance: 40,041; Referee: Stuart Attwell |

| 11 February 2023 23 | Fulham | 2–0 | Nottingham Forest | Fulham |
| 15:00 GMT | Willian 17'; Solomon 88' | Report | Aurier (yellow card) 15' | Stadium: Craven Cottage; Attendance: 24,244; Referee: Andrew Madley |

| 18 February 2023 24 | Brighton & Hove Albion | 0–1 | Fulham | Falmer |
| 15:00 GMT | | Report | Diop (yellow card) 70'; Carlos Vinícius (yellow card) 82'; Robinson (yellow card) 84'; Solomon 88'; Palhinha (yellow card) 90+1'; Willian (yellow card) 90+6' | Stadium: Falmer Stadium; Attendance: 31,619; Referee: Darren England |

| 24 February 2023 25 | Fulham | 1–1 | Wolverhampton Wanderers | Fulham |
| 20:00 GMT | Palhinha (yellow card) 18'; Solomon 64'; Pereira (yellow card) 73' | Report | Sarabia 23' | Stadium: Craven Cottage; Attendance: 24,399; Referee: Michael Oliver |

| 6 March 2023 26 | Brentford | 3–2 | Fulham | Brentford |
| 20:00 GMT | Pinnock 6'; Toney 53' (pen.); Jensen 85' | Report | Willian (yellow card) 25'; Lukić (yellow card) 35'; Mitrović (yellow card) 61'; Solomon 39'; Carlos Vinícius 90+9' | Stadium: Brentford Community Stadium; Attendance: 17,025; Referee: Anthony Taylor |

| 12 March 2023 27 | Fulham | 0–3 | Arsenal | Fulham |
| 14:00 GMT | | Report | Gabriel 21'; Martinelli 26'; Ødegaard 45+2', (yellow card) 74' | Stadium: Craven Cottage; Attendance: 24,426; Referee: David Coote |

| 1 April 2023 29 | Bournemouth | 2–1 | Fulham | Bournemouth |
| 15:00 BST | Tavernier 50'; Lerma (yellow card) 60'; Solanke 79' | Report | Pereira 16', (yellow card) 59'; Tete (yellow card) 67'; Cairney (yellow card) 81'; Robinson (yellow card) 90+2' | Stadium: Vitality Stadium; Attendance: 10,305; Referee: Peter Bankes |

| 8 April 2023 30 | Fulham | 0–1 | West Ham United | Fulham |
| 15:00 BST | Carlos Vinícius (yellow card) 62' | Report | Reed 23' (o.g.); Rice (yellow card) 73' | Stadium: Craven Cottage; Attendance: 24,491; Referee: Jarred Gillett |

| 15 April 2023 31 | Everton | 1–3 | Fulham | Walton |
| 15:00 BST | Gueye (yellow card) 27'; McNeil 35'; Gray (yellow card) 70'; Mykolenko (yellow card) 80' | Report | Reed 22'; Wilson 51'; James 68'; Adarabioyo (yellow card) 81'; Leno (yellow card) 90+6' | Stadium: Goodison Park; Attendance: 39,241; Referee: Anthony Taylor |

| 22 April 2023 32 | Fulham | 2–1 | Leeds United | Fulham |
| 12:30 BST | Palhinha (yellow card) 16'; Wilson 58'; Pereira 72' | Report | McKennie (yellow card) 37'; Wöber (yellow card) 62'; Cooper (yellow card) 67'; Palhinha 79' (o.g.); Roca (yellow card) 90+4' | Stadium: Craven Cottage; Attendance: 24,356; Referee: Peter Bankes |

| 25 April 2023 33 | Aston Villa | 1–0 | Fulham | Aston |
| 19:45 BST | Mings 21'; Young (yellow card) 74'; Martínez (yellow card) 88'; Traoré (yellow card) 89' | Report | Decordova-Reid (yellow card) 45+2'; Palhinha (yellow card) 79' | Stadium: Villa Park; Attendance: 41,046; Referee: Thomas Bramall |

| 30 April 2023 34 | Fulham | 1–2 | Manchester City | Fulham |
| 14:00 BST | Carlos Vinícius 15'; Tete (yellow card) 70' | Report | Haaland 3' (pen.); Álvarez 36'; Grealish (yellow card) 70'; Ederson (yellow card) 90+6'; Walker (yellow card) 90+8' | Stadium: Craven Cottage; Attendance: 24,498; Referee: Simon Hooper |

| 3 May 2023 28 | Liverpool | 1–0 | Fulham | Liverpool |
| 20:00 BST | Salah 39' (pen.) | Report | | Stadium: Anfield; Attendance: 52,602; Referee: Stuart Attwell |
Note: The match was originally scheduled for 18 March 2023, but was postponed due to Fulham’s participation in the FA Cup quarter-finals.

| 8 May 2023 35 | Fulham | 5–3 | Leicester City | Fulham |
| 15:00 BST | Willian 10', 70'; Carlos Vinícius 18'; Cairney 44', 51' | Report | Barnes (yellow card) 24', (goal) 59', 89'; Maddison (yellow card) 58', (goal) 81' (pen.); Vardy (penalty missed) 66'; Soumaré (yellow card) 70' | Stadium: Craven Cottage; Attendance: 24,442; Referee: Robert Jones |

| 13 May 2023 36 | Southampton | 0–2 | Fulham | Southampton |
| 15:00 BST | Lavia (yellow card) 53'; Djenepo (yellow card) 77' | Report | Carlos Vinícius 48'; Mitrović 72' | Stadium: St Mary's Stadium; Attendance: 28,978; Referee: Thomas Bramall |

| 20 May 2023 37 | Fulham | 2–2 | Crystal Palace | Fulham |
| 15:00 BST | Mitrović 45+5' (pen.), 61'; Adarabioyo (yellow card) 71'; Palhinha (yellow card) 85'; Robinson (yellow card) 90+1' | Report | Édouard 34'; Ward 83' | Stadium: Craven Cottage; Attendance: 24,356; Referee: Josh Smith |

| 28 May 2023 38 | Manchester United | 2–1 | Fulham | Manchester |
| 16:30 BST | Sancho 39'; Fernandes 55'; McTominay (yellow card) 87' | Report | Tete 19'; Mitrović (penalty missed) 26', (yellow card) 79'; Palhinha (yellow card) 51' | Stadium: Old Trafford; Attendance: 73,465; Referee: Robert Jones |

=== FA Cup ===
The club entered in the third round and were drawn away to Hull City. In the fourth round they were drawn at home to Sunderland.

Win Draw Loss Fixtures

| 7 January 2023 Third round | Hull City | 0–2 | Fulham | Kingston upon Hull |
| 15:00 GMT | Elder (yellow card) 47' | Report | Kurzawa 37'; Diop (yellow card) 42'; James 90+4' | Stadium: KCOM Stadium; Attendance: 14,175; Referee: Josh Smith |

| 28 January 2023 Fourth round | Fulham | 1–1 | Sunderland | Fulham |
| 15:00 GMT | Wilson (yellow card) 45+4'; Cairney 61'; Kurzawa (yellow card) 63' | Report | Clarke 6'; Alese (yellow card) 43'; Batth (yellow card) 75' | Stadium: Craven Cottage; Attendance: 22,905; Referee: Michael Salisbury |

| 8 February 2023 Fourth round replay | Sunderland | 2–3 | Fulham | Sunderland |
| 19:45 GMT | Clarke 77'; Bennette 90' | Report | Wilson 8'; Duffy (yellow card) 55'; Pereira 59'; Kurzawa 82' | Stadium: Stadium of Light; Attendance: 29,651; Referee: Tim Robinson |

| 28 February 2023 Fifth round | Fulham | 2–0 | Leeds United | Fulham |
| 19:45 GMT | Palhinha 21'; Solomon 56' | Report | | Stadium: Craven Cottage; Attendance: 19,359; Referee: Chris Kavanagh |

| 19 March 2023 Quarter-finals | Manchester United | 3–1 | Fulham | Manchester |
| 16:30 GMT | Maguire (yellow card) 21'; Fernandes 75' (pen.), 90+6'; Sabitzer 77' | Report | Pereira (yellow card) 18'; Mitrović 50', (red card) 72'; Robinson (yellow card) 67'; Willian (red card) 72' | Stadium: Old Trafford; Attendance: 73,511; Referee: Chris Kavanagh |

=== EFL Cup ===
Fulham entered the EFL Cup in the second round and were drawn away to Crawley Town.

Win Draw Loss Fixtures

| 23 August 2022 Second round | Crawley Town | 2–0 | Fulham | Crawley |
| 19:45 BST | Nichols 16'; Balagizi 49'; Omole (yellow card) 75' | Report | Diop (yellow card) 80' | Stadium: The People's Pension Stadium; Attendance: 5,577; Referee: Lee Swabey |

== Squad statistics ==
=== Appearances and goals ===
- Players listed with no appearances have been in the matchday squad but only as unused substitutes.

| No. | Pos | Nat | Player | Total | | Premier League | | FA Cup | | EFL Cup | |
| No. | Pos | Nat | Player | Apps | Goals | Apps | Goals | Apps | Goals | Apps | Goals |
Goalkeepers
| 1 | GK | (Slovakia) SVK | Marek Rodák | 7 | 0 | 2 | 0 | 4 | 0 | 1 | 0 |
| 17 | GK | (Germany) GER | Bernd Leno | 37 | 0 | 36 | 0 | 1 | 0 | 0 | 0 |
| 40 | GK | (England) ENG | George Wickens | 0 | 0 | 0 | 0 | 0 | 0 | 0 | 0 |
Defenders
| 2 | RB | (Netherlands) NED | Kenny Tete | 36 | 1 | 29+2 | 1 | 3+2 | 0 | 0 | 0 |
| 3 | LB | (France) FRA | Layvin Kurzawa | 6 | 2 | 2+1 | 0 | 3 | 2 | 0 | 0 |
| 4 | CB | (England) ENG | Tosin Adarabioyo | 29 | 1 | 23+2 | 1 | 4 | 0 | 0 | 0 |
| 5 | CB | (Republic of Ireland) IRL | Shane Duffy | 7 | 0 | 0+5 | 0 | 1 | 0 | 1 | 0 |
| 12 | RB | (Portugal) POR | Cédric Soares | 8 | 0 | 2+4 | 0 | 1+1 | 0 | 0 | 0 |
| 13 | CB | (United States) USA | Tim Ream | 35 | 1 | 33 | 1 | 2 | 0 | 0 | 0 |
| 31 | CB | (France) FRA | Issa Diop | 29 | 1 | 21+4 | 1 | 3 | 0 | 1 | 0 |
| 33 | LB | (United States) USA | Antonee Robinson | 38 | 0 | 35 | 0 | 2+1 | 0 | 0 | 0 |
| 41 | RB | (England) ENG | Luciano D'Auria-Henry | 0 | 0 | 0 | 0 | 0 | 0 | 0 | 0 |
| 42 | CB | (England) ENG | Charlie Robinson | 0 | 0 | 0 | 0 | 0 | 0 | 0 | 0 |
Midfielders
| 6 | CM | (England) ENG | Harrison Reed | 42 | 3 | 35+2 | 3 | 2+3 | 0 | 0 | 0 |
| 7 | LW | (Democratic Republic of the Congo) COD | Neeskens Kebano | 17 | 0 | 9+8 | 0 | 0 | 0 | 0 | 0 |
| 10 | CM | (Scotland) SCO | Tom Cairney | 38 | 3 | 6+27 | 2 | 3+1 | 1 | 1 | 0 |
| 11 | LW | (Israel) ISR | Manor Solomon | 24 | 5 | 4+15 | 4 | 3+2 | 1 | 0 | 0 |
| 18 | AM | (Brazil) BRA | Andreas Pereira | 38 | 5 | 33 | 4 | 4+1 | 1 | 0 | 0 |
| 20 | RW | (Brazil) BRA | Willian | 30 | 5 | 25+2 | 5 | 1+2 | 0 | 0 | 0 |
| 26 | DM | (Portugal) POR | João Palhinha | 40 | 4 | 35 | 3 | 4+1 | 1 | 0 | 0 |
| 28 | CM | (Serbia) SRB | Saša Lukić | 13 | 0 | 4+8 | 0 | 1 | 0 | 0 | 0 |
| 35 | CM | (Australia) AUS | Tyrese Francois | 2 | 0 | 0+1 | 0 | 0 | 0 | 1 | 0 |
| 38 | CM | (Wales) WAL | Luke Harris | 5 | 0 | 0+3 | 0 | 1 | 0 | 1 | 0 |
| 45 | AM | (Switzerland) SUI | Kristian Šekularac | 0 | 0 | 0 | 0 | 0 | 0 | 0 | 0 |
| 47 | LW | (England) ENG | Martial Godo | 1 | 0 | 0 | 0 | 0 | 0 | 0+1 | 0 |
| 49 | CM | (England) ENG | Matthew Dibley-Dias | 0 | 0 | 0 | 0 | 0 | 0 | 0 | 0 |
Forwards
| 8 | RW | (Wales) WAL | Harry Wilson | 33 | 3 | 13+16 | 2 | 4 | 1 | 0 | 0 |
| 9 | ST | (Serbia) SRB | Aleksandar Mitrović | 28 | 15 | 23+1 | 14 | 2+2 | 1 | 0 | 0 |
| 14 | AM/ST | (Jamaica) JAM | Bobby Decordova-Reid | 41 | 4 | 29+7 | 4 | 2+3 | 0 | 0 | 0 |
| 21 | RW/ST | (Wales) WAL | Daniel James | 23 | 3 | 5+15 | 2 | 1+2 | 1 | 0 | 0 |
| 30 | ST | (Brazil) BRA | Carlos Vinícius | 32 | 5 | 11+17 | 5 | 3+1 | 0 | 0 | 0 |
| 37 | ST | (Finland) FIN | Terry Ablade | 1 | 0 | 0 | 0 | 0 | 0 | 0+1 | 0 |
Out on Loan
| 19 | ST | (Brazil) BRA | Rodrigo Muniz | 0 | 0 | 0 | 0 | 0 | 0 | 0 | 0 |
| 22 | GK | (Argentina) ARG | Paulo Gazzaniga | 0 | 0 | 0 | 0 | 0 | 0 | 0 | 0 |
| 23 | LB | (England) ENG | Joe Bryan | 1 | 0 | 0 | 0 | 0 | 0 | 1 | 0 |
| 27 | RB | (Switzerland) SUI | Kevin Mbabu | 7 | 0 | 1+5 | 0 | 0 | 0 | 1 | 0 |
| 43 | CB | (Scotland) SCO | Connor McAvoy | 0 | 0 | 0 | 0 | 0 | 0 | 0 | 0 |
| 44 | CM | (Albania) ALB | Adrion Pajaziti | 0 | 0 | 0 | 0 | 0 | 0 | 0 | 0 |
| 46 | LW | (Republic of Ireland) IRL | Ollie O'Neill | 0 | 0 | 0 | 0 | 0 | 0 | 0 | 0 |
| 65 | ST | (England) ENG | Jay Stansfield | 4 | 0 | 1+2 | 0 | 0 | 0 | 1 | 0 |
Left the club during the Season
| 12 | CM | (England) ENG | Nathaniel Chalobah | 6 | 0 | 1+3 | 0 | 0+1 | 0 | 1 | 0 |
| 25 | CM | (England) ENG | Josh Onomah | 2 | 0 | 0+2 | 0 | 0 | 0 | 0 | 0 |
| 39 | RB | (United States) USA | Marlon Fossey | 1 | 0 | 0 | 0 | 0 | 0 | 1 | 0 |

Last updated: 28 May 2023
Source: Competitions, SoccerWay.com

=== Top scorers ===
Includes all competitive matches. The list is sorted by squad number when total goals are equal.

Last updated 28 May 2023

| Rank | No. | Nationality | Player | Premier League | FA Cup | EFL Cup | Total |
|---|---|---|---|---|---|---|---|
| 1 | 9 | (Serbia) | Aleksandar Mitrović | 14 | 1 | 0 | 15 |
| 2 | 11 | (Israel) | Manor Solomon | 4 | 1 | 0 | 5 |
| 2 | 18 | (Brazil) | Andreas Pereira | 4 | 1 | 0 | 5 |
| 2 | 20 | (Brazil) | Willian | 5 | 0 | 0 | 5 |
| 2 | 30 | (Brazil) | Carlos Vinícius | 5 | 0 | 0 | 5 |
| 6 | 14 | (Jamaica) | Bobby Decordova-Reid | 4 | 0 | 0 | 4 |
| 6 | 26 | (Portugal) | João Palhinha | 3 | 1 | 0 | 4 |
| 8 | 6 | (England) | Harrison Reed | 3 | 0 | 0 | 3 |
| 8 | 8 | (Wales) | Harry Wilson | 2 | 1 | 0 | 3 |
| 8 | 10 | (Scotland) | Tom Cairney | 2 | 1 | 0 | 3 |
| 8 | 21 | (Wales) | Daniel James | 2 | 1 | 0 | 3 |
| 12 | 3 | (France) | Layvin Kurzawa | 0 | 2 | 0 | 2 |
| 13 | 2 | (Netherlands) | Kenny Tete | 1 | 0 | 0 | 1 |
| 13 | 4 | (England) | Tosin Adarabioyo | 1 | 0 | 0 | 1 |
| 13 | 13 | (United States) | Tim Ream | 1 | 0 | 0 | 1 |
| 13 | 31 | (France) | Issa Diop | 1 | 0 | 0 | 1 |
| Own goals | | | | 3 | 0 | 0 | 3 |
| TOTALS | | | | 55 | 7 | 0 | 62 |
