= Gonçalo Agrelos =

Portuguese footballer (born 1998)

Personal information
- Full name: Gonçalo Alexandre Domingues Agrelos
- Date of birth: 18 February 1998 (age 28)
- Place of birth: Lisbon, Portugal
- Height: 1.80 m (5 ft 11 in)
- Position: Forward

Team information
- Current team: St George City
- Number: 18

Youth career
- 2007–2013: Sporting CP
- 2013–2014: Estoril Praia
- 2014–2015: Vitória Guimarães
- 2015–2016: Leixões
- 2016–2017: Belenenses

Senior career*
Years	Team	Apps	(Gls)
2017–2018	Belenenses	0	(0)
2017–2018	→ 1º Dezembro (loan)	3	(0)
2018–2022	Belenenses SAD	2	(0)
2020–2021	Belenenses SAD B	18	(0)
2022–2023	Real	18	(1)
2023–2024	Pero Pinheiro	13	(0)
2024	Primorje	16	(9)
2025–	St George City	9	(1)
- * Club domestic league appearances and goals as of 10 April 2025

Gonçalo Alexandre Domingues Agrelos (born 18 February 1998) sometimes known as Salo, is a Portuguese professional footballer who plays for Australian National Premier Leagues NSW side St George City as a forward.

== Football career ==
He made his Taça da Liga debut for Belenenses SAD on 3 August 2019 in a game against Santa Clara.
