= Bruno Tabata =

Brazilian footballer (born 1997)

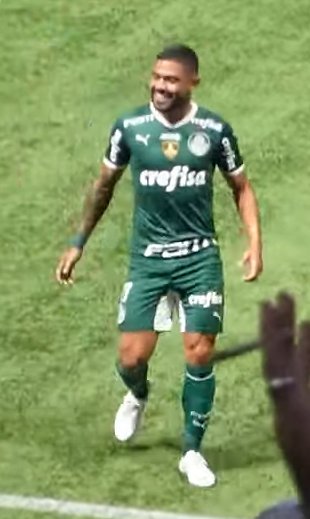

Personal information
- Full name: Bruno Vinícius Souza Ramos
- Date of birth: 30 March 1997 (age 29)
- Place of birth: Ipatinga, Brazil
- Height: 1.75 m (5 ft 9 in)
- Positions: Attacking midfielder; winger

Youth career
- 2014–2016: Atlético Mineiro

Senior career*
Years	Team	Apps	(Gls)
2016–2020	Portimonense	108	(8)
2020–2022	Sporting CP	37	(3)
2022–2024	Palmeiras	18	(0)
2023–2024	→ Qatar SC (loan)	21	(9)
2024–2026	Internacional	54	(5)

International career^{‡}
2019–2020	Brazil U23	7	(1)
- * Club domestic league appearances and goals as of 05:00, 25 July 2026 (UTC) ‡ National team caps and goals as of 1 October 2020

Bruno Vinícius Souza Ramos, known as Bruno Tabata (born 30 March 1997) is a Brazilian footballer who plays as an attacking midfielder.

== Club career ==
=== Early career ===
Born in Ipatinga, Tabata began playing at local clubs Aciaria FC and Usipa, before joining Atlético Mineiro's youth setup in 2014.

=== Portimonense ===
He signed for Portuguese club Portimonense in 2016 and made his professional debut for the side in a Segunda Liga match against Sporting B, on 6 August 2016.

=== Sporting CP ===
On 29 September 2020, Tabata joined Sporting CP on a five-year contract.

== Career statistics ==
As of match played 19 May 2025

Appearances and goals by club, season and competition
Club	Season	League			State league		National cup (Note: Includes Taça de Portugal, Copa do Brasil, Emir of Qatar Cup)		League cup (Note: Includes Taça da Liga, Qatari Stars Cup)		Continental		Other		Total	
Club	Season	Division	Apps	Goals	Apps	Goals	Apps	Goals	Apps	Goals	Apps	Goals	Apps	Goals	Apps	Goals
Portimonense	2016-17	LigaPro	32	2	—		0	0	1	0	—		—		33	2
Portimonense	2017-18	Primeira Liga	19	2	—		1	0	1	0	—		—		21	2
Portimonense	2018-19	Primeira Liga	31	3	—		0	0	1	0	—		—		32	3
Portimonense	2019-20	Primeira Liga	26	1	—		0	0	4	0	—		—		30	1
Portimonense	Total		108	8	—		1	0	7	0	—		—		116	8
Sporting CP	2020-21	Primeira Liga	16	0	—		3	1	1	1	0	0	—		20	2
Sporting CP	2021-22	Primeira Liga	21	3	—		3	2	3	0	4 (Note: Appearance(s) in UEFA Champions League)	1	1 (Note: Appearance(s) in Supertaça Cândido de Oliveira)	0	32	6
Sporting CP	Total		37	3	—		6	3	4	1	4	1	1	0	52	8
Palmeiras	2022	Série A	13	0	0	0	0	0	—		2 (Note: Appearance(s) in Copa Libertadores)	0	—		15	0
Palmeiras	2023	Série A	5	0	9 (Note: Appearance(s) in Campeonato Paulista)	1	2	1	—		1	0	0	0	17	2
Palmeiras	2024	Série A	0	0	0	0	0	0	—		0	0	0	0	0	0
Palmeiras	Total		18	0	9	1	2	1	—		3	0	0	0	32	2
Qatar SC (loan)	2023-24	Qatar Stars League	21	9	—		3	3	2	0	—		—		26	12
Internacional	2024	Série A	17	2	0	0	0	0	—		0	0	—		17	2
Internacional	2025	Série A	6	0	0	0	1	0	—		3	0	—		10	0
Internacional	Total		23	2	0	0	1	0	—		3	0	—		27	2
Career total			207	22	9	1	13	7	13	1	10	1	1	0	253	32

== Honours ==
Portimonense

- Segunda Liga: 2016–17

Sporting CP

- Primeira Liga: 2020–21
- Taça da Liga: 2020–21
- Supertaça Cândido de Oliveira: 2021

Palmeiras

- Campeonato Brasileiro Série A: 2022

Internacional

- Recopa Gaúcha: 2026
