= 2020–21 Taça da Liga =

Allianz Cup

Tournament details
- Country: Portugal
- Dates: 15 December 2020 – 23 January 2021
- Teams: 8

Final positions
- Champions: Sporting CP (3rd title)
- Runners-up: Braga

Tournament statistics
- Matches played: 7
- Goals scored: 18 (2.57 per match)

The 2020–21 Taça da Liga was the fourteenth edition of the Taça da Liga (also known as Allianz Cup for sponsorship reasons), a football league cup competition organised by the Liga Portuguesa de Futebol Profissional and contested exclusively by clubs competing in the two professional divisions of Portuguese football – the top-tier Primeira Liga and the second-tier Liga Portugal 2. Due to calendar limitations derived from the COVID-19 pandemic in Portugal, this season will follow a transitory format where only eight teams enter the competition.

The competition started with a quarter-final round played from 15 to 17 December 2020, and concluded with a final-four tournament, played at a neutral ground from 18 to 23 January 2021 with the final between Braga and Sporting CP. The Estádio Dr. Magalhães Pessoa in Leiria was chosen as the competition's final-four venue until 2023.

Braga were the holders and two-time winners, after beating Porto 1–0 in the 2020 final. Sporting CP won the final 1–0 over Braga for their third title.

== Format ==
The top six teams from the Primeira Liga and the top two non-reserve teams from the Liga Portugal 2 at the end of November (matchday 8 for Primeira Liga and matchday 10 for Liga Portugal 2) will be paired according to their league positions to play single-leg quarter-final matches:

- 1st place (Primeira Liga) vs. 2nd place (Liga Portugal 2)
- 2nd place (Primeira Liga) vs. 1st place (Liga Portugal 2)
- 3rd place (Primeira Liga) vs. 6th place (Primeira Liga)
- 4th place (Primeira Liga) vs. 5th place (Primeira Liga)

The winners qualify to the final-four tournament, which was played at a neutral venue and comprised two single-leg semi-finals and a final. The final four was scheduled to be played at the Estádio Dr. Magalhães Pessoa, in Leiria, until 2023.

== Qualified teams ==
Team	Tier	Rank (end of November 2020)
Sporting CP	Primeira Liga	1st place
Braga	Primeira Liga	2nd place
Benfica	Primeira Liga	3rd place
Porto	Primeira Liga	4th place
Paços de Ferreira	Primeira Liga	5th place
Vitória de Guimarães	Primeira Liga	6th place
Estoril	Liga Portugal 2	1st place
Mafra	Liga Portugal 2	2nd place

== Quarter-finals ==
In this round, teams were paired according to their league position at the end of November, with the best placed teams playing at home.

15 December 2020	Sporting CP	2–0	Mafra	Lisbon
20:15 WET (UTC±00:00)	Šporar 64'; Tabata 71'	Report		Stadium: Estádio de Alvalade; Attendance: 0 Referee: Tiago Martins

16 December 2020	Porto	2–1	Paços de Ferreira	Porto
18:45 WET (UTC±00:00)	Sarr 73'; Díaz 80'	Report	Castanheira 82'	Stadium: Estádio do Dragão; Attendance: 0 Referee: António Nobre

16 December 2020	Benfica	1–1 (4–1 p)	Vitória de Guimarães	Lisbon
21:00 WET (UTC±00:00)	Pizzi 83' (pen.)	Report	Estupiñán 16'	Stadium: Estádio da Luz; Attendance: 0 Referee: Fábio Veríssimo
	Penalties
	Everton (penalty scored); Pizzi (penalty scored); Gabriel (penalty scored); Seferovic (penalty scored)		(penalty missed) Almeida; (penalty scored) Pepelu; (penalty missed) Poha

17 December 2020	Braga	3–1	Estoril	Braga
20:15 WET (UTC±00:00)	Paulinho 14', 59', 78'	Report	Franco 64'	Stadium: Estádio Municipal de Braga; Attendance: 0 Referee: Luís Godinho

== Final-four ==
The final-four was played from 16 to 23 January 2021 in Estádio Dr. Magalhães Pessoa, Leiria, and comprised the semi-finals and final of the competition. The draw for this stage, where the semi-finals' pairings were made and the administrative home team was decided for both semi-finals and final, was made through videoconference on 21 December 2020, by Helton.

=== Bracket ===
Semi-finals
19 January – Estádio Dr. Magalhães Pessoa
Sporting CP	2
Porto	1
20 January – Estádio Dr. Magalhães Pessoa
Braga	2
Benfica	1

Final
23 January – Estádio Dr. Magalhães Pessoa
Sporting CP	1
Braga	0

=== Semi-finals ===
19 January 2021
19:45 WET (UTC±00:00)

Sporting CP	2–1	Porto
Cabral 86', 90+4'	Report	Marega 79'

Estádio Dr. Magalhães Pessoa, Leiria
Attendance: 0
Referee: João Pinheiro

20 January 2021
19:45 WET (UTC±00:00)

Braga	2–1	Benfica
Ruiz 28'; Tormena 59'	Report	Pizzi 45' (pen.)

Estádio Dr. Magalhães Pessoa, Leiria
Attendance: 0
Referee: Fábio Veríssimo

=== Final ===
23 January 2021
19:45 WET (UTC±00:00)

Sporting CP	1–0	Braga
Porro 41'	Report

Estádio Dr. Magalhães Pessoa, Leiria
Attendance: 0
Referee: Tiago Martins
