= 2023–24 Taça da Liga =

Allianz Cup

Tournament details
- Country: Portugal
- Dates: 21 July 2023 – 27 January 2024
- Teams: 34

Final positions
- Champions: Braga (3rd title)
- Runners-up: Estoril

Tournament statistics
- Matches played: 37
- Goals scored: 92 (2.49 per match)
- Attendance: 224,098 (6,057 per match)
- Top goal scorer(s): Clayton (4 goals)

The 2023–24 Taça da Liga was the seventeenth edition of the Taça da Liga (also known as Allianz Cup for sponsorship reasons), a football league cup competition organised by the Liga Portuguesa de Futebol Profissional and contested exclusively by clubs competing in the top two professional tiers of Portuguese football – the Primeira Liga and the LigaPro. It began on 21 July 2023 and concluded with the final in Leiria on 27 January 2024.

Porto were the defending champions, having beaten Sporting CP 2–0 in the 2023 final, but were eliminated in the group stage after losing 3–1 to Estoril on 6 December 2023.

== Format ==
Twenty-eight teams, consisting of all teams from the 2022–23 Primeira Liga and Segunda Liga (with the exception of the top six teams in the 2022–23 Primeira Liga), took part in the first round; one-legged ties with no extra-time were played between the sided.

In the second round, the fourteen teams advancing from the previous round were joined by the teams which placed 5th and 6th in the 2022–23 Primeira Liga. Again, one-legged ties with no extra time were played between the sixteen sides.

The third round featured the eight teams advancing from the previous round and the four best-placed teams in the 2022–23 Primeira Liga. The twelve teams were drawn into four groups that were contested in a single round-robin schedule, with each team playing one game at home and one game on the opposition's home.

The four group winners qualified for the knockout phase, which featured single-legged ties, again with no extra time being played. The semi-finals and final were played at a neutral venue, held in Leiria in January 2024.

Round	Teams entering in this round	Teams advancing from previous round
First round (28 teams)	16 teams from the 2023–24 Liga Portugal 2; 9 teams ranked 7th–15th in the 2022–23 Primeira Liga; 3 teams promoted to the 2023–24 Primeira Liga	
Second round (16 teams)	2 teams ranked 5th and 6th in the 2022–23 Primeira Liga	14 winners from the first round
Third round (12 teams)	4 teams ranked 1st–4th in the 2022–23 Primeira Liga	8 winners from the second round
Semi-finals (4 teams)		4 group winners from the third round
Final (2 teams)		2 winners from the semi-finals

=== Tiebreakers ===
In the third round, teams were ranked according to points (3 points for a win, 1 point for a draw, 0 points for a loss). If two or more teams were tied on points on completion of the group matches, the following criteria were applied to determine the rankings:

1. highest goal difference in all group matches;
2. highest number of scored goals in all group matches;
3. lowest average age of all players fielded in all group matches (sum of the ages of all fielded players divided by the number of fielded players).

In all other rounds, teams tied at the end of regular time contested a penalty shoot-out to determine the winner. No extra time was played.

== Teams ==
The thirty-four teams competing in the two professional tiers of Portuguese football for the 2023–24 season were eligible to participate in this competition. For teams that were either promoted or related, the final position in the previous league season determined in which round they entered the competition.

Third round (Primeira Liga)
Benfica (1st)	Porto (2nd)	Braga (3rd)	Sporting CP (4th)
Second round (Primeira Liga)
Arouca (5th)	Vitória de Guimarães (6th)		
First round (Primeira and Segunda Liga)
Chaves (7th)	Famalicão (8th)	Boavista (9th)	Casa Pia (10th)
Vizela (11th)	Rio Ave (12th)	Gil Vicente (13th)	Estoril (14th)
Portimonense (15th)	Moreirense (P1)	Farense (P1)	Estrela da Amadora (P1)
Marítimo (R1)	Paços de Ferreira (R1)	Santa Clara (R1)	Académico de Viseu (4th)
Mafra (6th)	AVS (7th)	Feirense (8th)	Torreense (9th)
Oliveirense (10th)	Tondela (11th)	Penafiel (12th)	Nacional (13th)
Leixões (15th)	União de Leiria (P2)	Belenenses (P2)	Länk Vilaverdense (P2)

Key

- Nth: League position in the 2022–23 season
- P1: Promoted to the Primeira Liga
- R1: Relegated to the Liga Portugal 2
- P2: Promoted to the Liga Portugal 2

== Schedule ==
Round		Draw date	Match date(s)	Teams	Fixtures
First round		3 July 2023	21–29 July 2023	34 → 20	14
Second round		3 July 2023	28 July – 9 September 2023	20 → 12	8
Third round	Matchday 1	11 September 2023	26–28 September 2023	12 → 4	12
Third round	Matchday 2	11 September 2023	31 October – 6 December 2023	12 → 4	12
Third round	Matchday 3	11 September 2023	21–23 December 2023	12 → 4	12
Final four	Semi-finals	11 September 2023	23–24 January 2024	4 → 2	2
Final four	Final	11 September 2023	27 January 2024	2 → 1	1

== First round ==
Twenty-eight teams consisting in all teams from Primeira and Segunda Liga with exception of the top 6 teams in 2022–23 Primeira Liga took part in the first round. Twenty-eight teams were paired against each other for fourteen single-legged ties. The draw took place on 3 July 2023, and the matches were played on 21 and 29 July 2023. Games tied at the end of regular time were decided by a penalty shoot-out, with no extra time being played. The first team drawn in each fixture played at home.

21 July 2023	Torreense	1–0	Mafra	Torres Vedras
20:15 WEST (UTC+01:00)	Welthon 90+3'	Report		Stadium: Estádio Manuel Marques; Attendance: 1,021; Referee: Márcio Torres

22 July 2023	Rio Ave	3–0	Académico de Viseu	Vila do Conde
11:00 WEST (UTC+01:00)	Costinha 45+3', 84'; Pantalon 52'	Report		Stadium: Estádio dos Arcos; Attendance: 1,746; Referee: Hélder Carvalho

22 July 2023	Vizela	2–1	Marítimo	Vizela
15:30 WEST (UTC+01:00)	Samu 45+1'; Nuno Moreira 90+1'	Report	Xadas 31' (pen.)	Stadium: Estádio do FC Vizela; Attendance: 2,020; Referee: Bruno Vieira

22 July 2023	Nacional	0–0 (5–3 p)	Penafiel	Funchal
15:30 WEST (UTC+01:00)		Report		Stadium: Estádio da Madeira; Attendance: 636; Referee: João Pedro Afonso
	Penalties
	Dudu (penalty scored); João Aurélio (penalty scored); Carlos Daniel (penalty scored); Esteves (penalty scored); Jota (penalty scored)		Teixeira (penalty scored); João Oliveira (penalty missed); Robinho (penalty scored); João Miguel (penalty scored)

22 July 2023	AVS	1–1 (5–3 p)	Chaves	Vila das Aves
18:00 WEST (UTC+01:00)	Nenê 44'	Report	Correira 68'	Stadium: Estádio do CD Aves; Attendance: 1,047; Referee: José Bessa
	Penalties
	Nenê (penalty scored); Paraíba (penalty scored); Luís Silva (penalty scored); Dioh (penalty scored); Correia (penalty scored)		Langa (penalty scored); Pinho (penalty scored); Jô (penalty scored); Rodrigues (penalty missed)

22 July 2023	Estoril	2–0	Paços de Ferreira	Estoril
20:30 WEST (UTC+01:00)	Marques 34'; Cassiano 71'	Report		Stadium: Estádio António Coimbra da Mota; Attendance: 1,139; Referee: Carlos Macedo

22 July 2023	Oliveirense	1–0	Gil Vicente	Oliveira de Azeméis
20:30 WEST (UTC+01:00)	Schutte 66'	Report		Stadium: Estádio Carlos Osório; Attendance: 733; Referee: David Rafael Silva

23 July 2023	Leixões	0–0 (4–3 p)	Feirense	Matosinhos
11:00 WEST (UTC+01:00)		Report		Stadium: Estádio do Mar; Attendance: 1,136; Referee: Vítor Ferreira
	Penalties
	Fábio (penalty scored); Amorim (penalty scored); Alves (penalty scored); Miguel Silva (penalty scored)		Cláudio Silva (penalty missed); Brás (penalty scored); Oche (penalty scored); Jorge Pereira (penalty scored); Jocú (penalty missed)

23 July 2023	Moreirense	1–1 (3–4 p)	Farense	Moreira de Cónegos
15:30 WEST (UTC+01:00)	André Luis 89'	Report	Rui Costa 21'	Stadium: Parque Moreira de Cónegos; Attendance: 1,208; Referee: Claúdio Pereira
	Penalties
	André Luis (penalty scored); Alan (penalty scored); Franco (penalty missed); Amador (penalty scored); Marcelo (penalty missed)		Ponde (penalty missed); Talocha (penalty scored); Falcão (penalty scored); Matias (penalty scored); Rafael Barbosa (penalty scored)

23 July 2023	Länk Vilaverdense	0–2	Casa Pia	Paços de Ferreira
18:00 WEST (UTC+01:00)		Report	Clayton 13'; Pinto 35' (pen.)	Stadium: Estádio da Capital do Móvel; Attendance: 390; Referee: João Gonçalves

23 July 2023	Belenenses	3–2	Famalicão	Lisbon
18:00 WEST (UTC+01:00)	Attard 14'; Uche 61'; Valente 90+11' (pen.)	Report	Riccieli 31'; Cádiz 61'	Stadium: Estádio do Restelo; Attendance: 1,358; Referee: Fábio Melo

23 July 2023	Portimonense	3–1	Estrela da Amadora	Portimão
20:30 WEST (UTC+01:00)	Rildo 6' (pen.); Carrilo 62'; Carlinhos 82' (pen.)	Report	Tavares 58'	Stadium: Estádio Municipal de Portimão; Attendance: 968; Referee: Ricardo Baixinho

24 July 2023	Boavista	0–0 (4–5 p)	União de Leiria	Porto
20:15 WEST (UTC+01:00)		Report		Stadium: Estádio do Bessa; Attendance: 0 Referee: Bruno Costa
	Penalties
	Vukotić (penalty missed); Reisinho (penalty scored); Morais (penalty scored); Abascal (penalty scored); Malheiro (penalty scored); Pérez (penalty missed)		Bura (penalty scored); Baixinho (penalty scored); Empis (penalty scored); Ouattara (penalty scored); Leandro Silva (penalty missed); Valente (penalty scored)

29 July 2023	Santa Clara	0–0 (2–4 p)	Tondela	Ponta Delgada
14:30 WEST (UTC+01:00)		Report		Stadium: Estádio de São Miguel; Attendance: 796; Referee: Diogo Rosa
	Penalties
	Adriano (penalty scored); Klismahn (penalty missed); Vinícius Lopes (penalty scored); Paulo Henrique (penalty missed)		Rocha (penalty scored); Clebinho (penalty scored); Gustavo França (penalty scored); Rui Gomes (penalty scored)

== Second round ==
In the second round, the fourteen first-round winners joined the two teams ranked 5th and 6th in the 2022–23 Primeira Liga. Sixteen teams were paired against each other for twelve single-legged ties. The draw took place on 3 July 2023, and the matches were played on 28 July and 9 September 2023. Games tied at the end of regular time were decided by a penalty shoot-out, with no extra time being played. The first team drawn in each fixture played at home.

28 July 2023	AVS	1–0	Vizela	Vila das Aves
20:15 WEST (UTC+01:00)	Nenê 33'	Report		Stadium: Estádio do CD Aves; Attendance: 1,833; Referee: David Rafael Silva

29 July 2023	Farense	3–2	Oliveirense	Faro
18:00 WEST (UTC+01:00)	Matias 16'; Rui Costa 30'; Mattheus Oliveira 35'	Report	Schutte 55'; Zé Pedro 60'	Stadium: Estádio de São Luís; Attendance: 1,708; Referee: Pedro Ramalho

29 July 2023	Estoril	5–1	Belenenses	Estoril
20:30 WEST (UTC+01:00)	Rodrigo Martins 45+2'; Tiago Araújo 56'; Feltes 64'; Joãozinho 74', 89'	Report	Sambú 90+2'	Stadium: Estádio António Coimbra da Mota; Attendance: 2,149; Referee: Anzhony Rodrigues

30 July 2023	Leixões	0–0 (5–4 p)	Portimonense	Matosinhos
11:00 WEST (UTC+01:00)		Report		Stadium: Estádio do Mar; Attendance: 1,384; Referee: Márcio Torres
	Penalties
	Ricardo Valente (penalty scored); Freitas (penalty scored); Amorim (penalty scored); Bolgado; Paulinho (penalty missed); Renato Luís (penalty scored)		Carlinhos (penalty scored); Estrela (penalty scored); Relvas (penalty scored); Paulinho (penalty missed); Seck (penalty scored); Gonçalo (penalty missed)

30 July 2023	União de Leiria	3–3 (4–5 p)	Nacional	Leiria
11:00 WEST (UTC+01:00)	Jair 11'; Róchez 37' (pen.); Bura 45'	Report	Pira 24'; Carlos Daniel 69'; Gustavo 90+2'	Stadium: Estádio Municipal de Leiria; Attendance: 6,121; Referee: Sérgio Guelho
	Penalties
	Bura (penalty missed); Leandro Silva (penalty scored); Baixinho (penalty missed); Ouattara (penalty scored); Valente (penalty missed); Valdir (penalty scored); Resende (penalty scored); Jair (penalty missed)		Esteves (penalty missed); Carlos Daniel (penalty scored); Aurélio (penalty scored); Paulo Vitor (penalty missed); Pira (penalty missed); Pola (penalty scored); Shatri (penalty scored); Gustavo (penalty scored)

30 July 2023	Torreense	0–2	Casa Pia	Torres Vedras
18:00 WEST (UTC+01:00)		Report	Clayton 42'; Felippe 68'	Stadium: Estádio Manuel Marques; Attendance: 1,087; Referee: João Pedro Afonso

30 July 2023	Arouca	2–0	Rio Ave	Arouca
20:30 WEST (UTC+01:00)	Kouassi 24'; Mújica 67'	Report		Stadium: Estádio Municipal de Arouca; Attendance: 1,669; Referee: Flávio Duarte

9 September 2023	Vitória de Guimarães	0–1	Tondela	Guimarães
20:30 WEST (UTC+01:00)		Report	dos Anjos 56'	Stadium: Estádio D. Afonso Henriques; Attendance: 10,115; Referee: Manuel Oliveira

== Third round ==
In the third round, the eight second-round winners joined the four top-ranked teams from the 2022–23 Primeira Liga: Benfica (1st), Porto (2nd), Braga (3rd) and Sporting CP (4th). These twelve teams were drawn into four groups of three, each group containing one of the four top-ranked Primeira Liga teams. Group matches were played in a single round-robin schedule, ensuring that each team played at least one match at home.

=== Group A ===
Pos	Team	Pld	W	D	L	GF	GA	GD	Pts	Qualification	BRA	CAS	NAC
1	Braga	2	1	1	0	4	2	+2	4	Advance to knockout phase	—	1–1	—
2	Casa Pia	2	1	1	0	3	2	+1	4		—	—	2–1
3	Nacional	2	0	0	2	2	5	−3	0		1–3	—	—

Source: Liga Portugal
Rules for classification: Tiebreakers

28 September 2023	Casa Pia	2–1	Nacional	Lisbon
20:15	Cardoso 55'; Clayton 90+4'	Report	Witi 3'	Stadium: Estádio Pina Manique; Attendance: 1,314; Referee: Miguel Fonseca

1 November 2023	Braga	1–1	Casa Pia	Braga
20:15	Pizzi 62'	Report	Clayton 76' (pen.)	Stadium: Estádio Municipal de Braga; Attendance: 6,005; Referee: André Narciso

22 December 2023	Nacional	1–3	Braga	Funchal
20:15	Gomes 62'	Report	Moutinho 16' (pen.); Niakaté 24'; Horta 44'	Stadium: Estádio da Madeira; Attendance: 1,784; Referee: Miguel Nogueira

=== Group B ===
Pos	Team	Pld	W	D	L	GF	GA	GD	Pts	Qualification	BEN	ARO	AVS
1	Benfica	2	2	0	0	6	1	+5	6	Advance to knockout phase	—	—	4–1
2	Arouca	2	1	0	1	2	3	−1	3		0–2	—	—
3	AVS	2	0	0	2	2	6	−4	0		—	1–2	—

Source: Liga Portugal
Rules for classification: Tiebreakers

26 September 2023	AVS	1–2	Arouca	Vila das Aves
20:15	Carlos Daniel 59'	Report	Jason 17'; González 67'	Stadium: Estádio do CD Aves; Attendance: 602; Referee: Tiago Martins

31 October 2023	Arouca	0–2	Benfica	Arouca
20:15		Report	Di María 26'; Cabral 74'	Stadium: Estádio Municipal de Arouca; Attendance: 3,405; Referee: Hélder Carvalho

21 December 2023	Benfica	4–1	AVS	Lisbon
20:15	Di María 26'; João Mário 44'; Gouveia 65'; Correia 68' (o.g.)	Report	Mercado 21'	Stadium: Estádio da Luz; Attendance: 48,959; Referee: Carlos Macedo

=== Group C ===
Pos	Team	Pld	W	D	L	GF	GA	GD	Pts	Qualification	SPO	FAR	TON
1	Sporting CP	2	2	0	0	6	3	+3	6	Advance to knockout phase	—	4–2	—
2	Farense	2	1	0	1	3	4	−1	3		—	—	1–0
3	Tondela	2	0	0	2	1	3	−2	0		1–2	—	—

Source: Liga Portugal
Rules for classification: Tiebreakers

27 September 2023	Farense	1–0	Tondela	Faro
19:00	Zé Luís 14'	Report		Stadium: Estádio de São Luís; Attendance: 1,545; Referee: André Narciso

2 November 2023	Sporting CP	4–2	Farense	Lisbon
20:15	Gyökeres 24', 28' (pen.), 63'; Nuno Santos 56'	Report	Mattheus 49'; Gonçalves 79'	Stadium: Estádio José Alvalade; Attendance: 22,801; Referee: Gustavo Correia

23 December 2023	Tondela	1–2	Sporting CP	Tondela
18:00	Tavares 76'	Report	Bragança 17'; Paulinho 32'	Stadium: Estádio João Cardoso; Attendance: 4,689; Referee: David Rafael Silva

=== Group D ===
Pos	Team	Pld	W	D	L	GF	GA	GD	Pts	Qualification	EST	POR	LEI
1	Estoril	2	2	0	0	5	2	+3	6	Advance to knockout phase	—	3–1	—
2	Porto	2	1	0	1	3	4	−1	3		—	—	2–1
3	Leixões	2	0	0	2	2	4	−2	0		1–2	—	—

Source: Liga Portugal
Rules for classification: Tiebreakers

27 September 2023	Leixões	1–2	Estoril	Matosinhos
20:45	Bolgado 8'	Report	Cassiano 3'; Tavares 62'	Stadium: Estádio do Mar; Attendance: 2,187; Referee: Hélder Carvalho

6 December 2023	Estoril	3–1	Porto	Estoril
18:00	Cassiano 22'; Guitane 90+1'; João Carlos 90+5' (pen.)	Report	Pepê 34'	Stadium: Estádio António Coimbra da Mota; Attendance: 2,684; Referee: Hélder Malheiro

23 December 2023	Porto	2–1	Leixões	Porto
20:30	Conceição 7'; Taremi 85' (pen.)	Report	Fabinho 14' (pen.)	Stadium: Estádio do Dragão; Attendance: 30,210; Referee: José Bessa

== Knockout phase ==
The knockout phase was contested as a final-four tournament by the four third round group winners in one-legged semi-finals and final. All matches were played in a single venue, decided before the competition had started. As in the first and second round, matches tied at the end of regular time were decided by a penalty shoot-out, with no extra time being played.

All matches were played at the Estádio Dr. Magalhães Pessoa in Leiria, with the semi-finals played on 23–24 January, and the final on 27 January 2024.

Semi-finals
23 January – Leiria
Braga	1
Sporting CP	0
24 January – Leiria
Benfica	1 (4)
Estoril (p)	1 (5)

Final
27 January – Leiria
Braga (p)	1 (5)
Estoril	1 (4)

=== Semi-finals ===
23 January 2024
19:45 WET (UTC±00:00)

Braga	1–0	Sporting CP
Ruiz 65'	Report

Estádio Dr. Magalhães Pessoa, Leiria
Attendance: 18,504
Referee: Nuno Almeida

24 January 2024
19:45 WET (UTC±00:00)

Benfica	1–1	Estoril
Otamendi 58'	Report	Guitane 16'
Penalties
João Mário (penalty scored); Marcos Leonardo (penalty missed); Otamendi (penalty scored); Cabral (penalty scored); Di María (penalty scored); Tomás Araújo (penalty missed)	4–5	(penalty scored) Guitane; (penalty scored) Marqués; (penalty scored) Ndiaye; (penalty missed) Marques; (penalty scored) Tiago Araújo; (penalty scored) Vital

Estádio Dr. Magalhães Pessoa, Leiria
Attendance: 20,155
Referee: Cláudio Pereira

=== Final ===
27 January 2024
19:45 WET

Braga	1–1	Estoril
Horta 20'	Report	Cassiano 6' (pen.)
Penalties
Horta (penalty scored); Moutinho (penalty scored); Ruiz (penalty scored); Pizzi (penalty scored); Al-Musrati (penalty scored)	5–4	(penalty scored) Feltes; (penalty scored) Marqués; (penalty scored) Tavares; (penalty scored) Pina; (penalty missed) Araújo

Estádio Dr. Magalhães Pessoa, Leiria
Attendance: 18,989
Referee: Fábio Veríssimo (Leiria)
