= 2024 Taça da Liga final =

2024 Taça da Liga Final
- Event: 2023–24 Taça da Liga
Braga	Estoril
1	1
- Braga won 5–4 on penalties
- Date: 27 January 2024
- Venue: Estádio Dr. Magalhães Pessoa, Leiria
- Referee: Fábio Veríssimo
- Attendance: 18,998

The 2024 Taça da Liga final was the final match of the 2023–24 Taça da Liga, the seventeenth season of the Taça da Liga. It was played on 27 January 2024 at Estádio Dr. Magalhães Pessoa.

The competition involved the 34 clubs playing in the top two tiers of the Portuguese football league system – 18 from Primeira Liga and 16 from Liga Portugal 2 – during the 2022–23 season. Reserve sides of Primeira Liga teams that played in the 2023–24 Primeira Liga were excluded from the competition.

Braga and Estoril faced off for the first time in the first final involving both teams, with Estoril making into their first cup final since the 1944 Taça de Portugal final. In the final, Braga won the final 5–4 after a penalty shootout, thus becoming only the third team (after Benfica and Sporting CP) in the competition's history to win the Taça da Liga for their third time.

== Background ==
This season featured the return of the final four format with both the semi-finals and the final being played over a space of a few days in the same venue. The Estádio Dr. Magalhães Pessoa hosted all matches. Braga made their fifth appearance in the Taça da Liga final after their last final in 2021, where they were defeated by Sporting CP 2–1. Estoril made into their first appearance in any national competition final in the club's history in 80 years, with their last cup final being in the 1944 Taça de Portugal final, where they lost to Benfica.

== Route to the final ==
Note: In all results below, the score of the finalist is given first (H: home; A: away).

Braga			Round	Estoril		
Opponent	Result	Stadium	First round	Opponent	Result	Stadium
Bye			First round	Paços de Ferreira	2–0 (H)	Estádio António Coimbra da Mota
Opponent	Result	Stadium	Second round	Opponent	Result	Stadium
Bye			Second round	Belenenses	5–1 (H)	Estádio António Coimbra da Mota
Opponent	Result	Stadium	Third round	Opponent	Result	Stadium
Casa Pia	1–1 (H)	Estádio Municipal de Braga	Matchday 1	Leixões	2–1 (A)	Estádio do Mar
Nacional	3–1 (A)	Estádio da Madeira	Matchday 2	Porto	3–1 (H)	Estádio António Coimbra da Mota
Group A winners: Team / Pld / W / D / L / GF / GA / GD / Pts; Braga / 2 / 1 / 1 / 0 / 4 / 2 / +2 / 4; Casa Pia / 2 / 1 / 1 / 0 / 3 / 2 / +1 / 4; Nacional / 2 / 0 / 0 / 2 / 2 / 5 / -3 / 0			Final standings	Group D winners: Team / Pld / W / D / L / GF / GA / GD / Pts; Estoril / 2 / 2 / 0 / 0 / 5 / 2 / +3 / 6; Porto / 2 / 1 / 0 / 1 / 3 / 4 / -1 / 3; Leixões / 2 / 0 / 0 / 2 / 2 / 4 / –2 / 0		
Opponent	Result	Stadium	Knockout phase	Opponent	Result	Stadium
Benfica	1–1 (5–4p) (N)	Estádio Dr. Magalhães Pessoa	Semi-finals	Sporting CP	1–0 (N)	Estádio Dr. Magalhães Pessoa

== Match ==
=== Details ===
27 January 2024
19:45 WET

Braga	1–1	Estoril
Horta 20'	Report	Cassiano 6' (pen.)
Penalties
Horta (penalty scored); Moutinho (penalty scored); Ruiz (penalty scored); Pizzi (penalty scored); Al-Musrati (penalty scored)	5–4	(penalty scored) Feltes; (penalty scored) Marqués; (penalty scored) Tavares; (penalty scored) Pina; (penalty missed) Araújo

Estádio Dr. Magalhães Pessoa, Leiria
Attendance: 18,989
Referee: Fábio Veríssimo (Leiria)

Braga	Estoril

GK	1	(Brazil) Matheus
RB	2	(Spain) Víctor Gómez	(substituted off) 76'
CB	6	(Portugal) José Fonte	(yellow card) 5'	(substituted off) 76'
CB	15	(Portugal) Paulo Oliveira
LB	26	(Colombia) Cristian Borja
CM	18	(Brazil) Vitor Carvalho	(substituted off) 67'
CM	28'	(Portugal) João Moutinho
RW	14	(Spain) Álvaro Djaló	(yellow card) 22'	(substituted off) 56'
AM	16	(Uruguay) Rodrigo Zalazar	(substituted off) 67'
LW	21	(Portugal) Ricardo Horta (c)	(yellow card) 64'
CF	9	(Spain) Abel Ruiz
Substitutes:
GK	12	(Portugal) Tiago Sá
DF	17	(Sweden) Joe Mendes	(substituted in) 76'
DF	5	(Turkey) Serdar Saatçı	(substituted in) 76'
DF	55	(Portugal) Francisco Chissumba]
MF	8	(Libya) Ali Musrati	(substituted in) 67'
MF	90	(Senegal) Djibril Soumaré
MF	22	(Portugal) Pizzi	(substituted in) 67'
FW	20	(Portugal) Rony Lopes
FW	11	(Guinea-Bissau) Roger Fernandes	(substituted in) 56'
Manager:
(Portugal) Artur Jorge

GK	14	(Portugal) Dani Figueira (c)	(yellow card) 83'
CB	23	(Portugal) Pedro Álvaro	(substituted off) 63'
CB	3	(Portugal) Bernardo Vital
CB	22	(France) Eliaquim Mangala
LM	79	(Portugal) Wagner Pina	(yellow card) 45+1'
CM	82	(Portugal) Mateus Fernandes	(yellow card) 43'
CM	83	(France) Koba Koindredi	(substituted off) 59'
RM	78	(Portugal) Tiago Araújo	(yellow card) 37'
RW	10	(France) Rafik Guitane	(yellow card) 62'	(substituted off) 85'
CF	11	(Brazil) Cassiano	(substituted off) 59'
LW	33	(Portugal) João Marques
Substitutes:
GK	31	(Brazil) Marcelo Carné
DF	2	(Spain) Raúl Parra
DF	5	(Brazil) Volnei Feltes	(substituted in) 63'
MF	64	(Nigeria) Mor Ndiaye
MF	8	(Scotland) Jordan Holsgrove	(substituted in) 59'
FW	91	(Portugal) Heriberto Tavares	(substituted in) 85'
FW	9	(Venezuela) Alejandro Marqués	(substituted in) 59'
FW	20	(Brazil) João Carlos
FW	29	(Serbia) Nemanja Jović
Manager:
(Portugal) Vasco Seabra (yellow card) 43'

Assistant referees:
Pedro Martins
Hugo Marques
Fourth official:
Hélder Carvalho
Video assistant referee:
Luís Godinho
Assistant video assistant referee:
Hugo Miguel

Match rules

- 90 minutes.
- Penalty shoot-out if scores still level.
- Seven named substitutes.
- Maximum of three substitutions.

== See also ==
- 2023–24 G.D. Estoril Praia season
- 2023–24 S.C. Braga season
- 2024 Taça de Portugal final
