= 2023–24 G.D. Estoril Praia season =

G.D. Estoril Praia
2023–24 season
- President: Ignacio Beristain
- Head coach: Álvaro Pacheco
- Stadium: Estádio António Coimbra da Mota
- Primeira Liga: 13th
- Taça de Portugal: Fifth round
- Taça da Liga: Runner-up
- Top goalscorer: League: Cassiano; Alejandro Marqués; João Marques (5 each); All: Cassiano (8 goals)

The 2023–24 season is G.D. Estoril Praia's 85th season in existence and third consecutive in the Primeira Liga, the top division of association football in Portugal. They are also competing in the Taça de Portugal and the Taça da Liga.

== Players ==
=== First-team squad ===
As of 11 August 2023

Note: Flags indicate national team as defined under FIFA eligibility rules; some limited exceptions apply. Players may hold more than one non-FIFA nationality.

No.	Pos.	Nation	Player
2	DF	ESP	Raúl Parra
3	DF	POR	Bernardo Vital
5	DF	BRA	Volnei Feltes
6	MF	POR	Alex Soares
7	FW	POR	Rodrigo Martins
8	MF	SCO	Jordan Holsgrove (on loan from Olympiacos)
9	FW	VEN	Alejandro Marqués
10	MF	FRA	Rafik Guitane
11	FW	BRA	Cassiano
18	DF	URU	Erick Cabaco
20	FW	BRA	João Carlos
21	FW	POR	Rodrigo Gomes (on loan from Braga)
22	DF	FRA	Eliaquim Mangala
23	DF	POR	Pedro Álvaro
24	MF	NED	Finn Dicke

No.	Pos.	Nation	Player
25	FW	NGR	Bamidele Yusuf
28	MF	NED	Ivan Pavlić
30	FW	POR	Rodrigo Ramos
31	GK	BRA	Marcelo Carné
33	MF	POR	João Marques
64	MF	SEN	Mor Ndiaye
67	DF	STP	Ricardo Fernandes
78	FW	POR	Tiago Araújo
79	DF	POR	Wagner Pina
81	GK	POR	Diogo Dias
83	MF	FRA	Koba Koindredi (on loan from Valencia)
87	MF	POR	Fran Pereira
91	FW	POR	Heriberto Tavares
95	MF	CMR	James Léa Siliki
99	GK	POR	Dani Figueira (Captain)
—	MF	FRA	Mabrouk Rouaï

=== Out on loan ===
Note: Flags indicate national team as defined under FIFA eligibility rules; some limited exceptions apply. Players may hold more than one non-FIFA nationality.

No.	Pos.	Nation	Player
—	FW	COL	Juan Esteban Mina (at Metalac until 30 June 2024)
—	FW	CPV	Benchimol (at Benfica B until 30 June 2024)

== Transfers ==
=== In ===
Pos.	Player	Transferred from	Fee	Date	Source
DF	(France) Eliaquim Mangala	Free agent	Free	7 August 2023	
MF	(Portugal) Rodrigo Gomes	(Portugal) Braga	Loan	8 August 2023	
MF	(New Caledonia) Koba Koindredi	(Spain) Valencia	Loan	8 August 2023	
DF	(Uruguay) Erick Cabaco	(Spain) Getafe	Free	9 August 2023	
GK	(Brazil) Marcelo Carné	(Portugal) Marítimo	Free	10 August 2023	

=== Out ===
Pos.	Player	Transferred to	Fee	Date	Source
MF	(France) Titouan Thomas	(France) Laval	Undisclosed	16 August 2023	

== Pre-season and friendlies ==
Win Draw Loss Fixtures

Estoril started the pre-season on 30 June.

8 July 2023 Friendly	Estoril (Portugal)	1–1	(Portugal) Braga B	Alcochete
10:00 UTC+1	Tavares 60'	Report	Mendonça 78'	Stadium: Academia Cristiano Ronaldo

12 July 2023 Friendly	Mafra (Portugal)	1–3	(Portugal) Estoril	Mafra
10:30 UTC+1				Stadium: Estádio Municipal de Mafra

15 July 2023 Friendly	Estoril (Portugal)	2–1	(Portugal) Belenenses	Estoril
10:00 UTC+1	Cassiano 45'; João Carlos 85'		Sambú 55'	Stadium: Estádio António Coimbra da Mota

19 July 2023 Friendly	Estoril (Portugal)	0–0	(England) Sheffield United	Estoril
19:30 UTC+1				Stadium: Estádio António Coimbra da Mota; Referee: Hélder Carvalho (Portugal)

5 August 2023 Friendly	Boavista (Portugal)	0–0	(Portugal) Estoril	Porto
10:30 UTC+1

== Competitions ==
=== Overall record ===
Competition	First match	Last match	Starting round	Record							
Competition	First match	Last match	Starting round	Pld	W	D	L	GF	GA	GD	Win %
Primeira Liga	13 August 2023	May 2024	Matchday 1	2	1	0	1	5	4	+1	50.00
Taça de Portugal	TBD			0	0	0	0	0	0	+0	—
Taça da Liga	22 July 2023		First round	2	2	0	0	7	1	+6	100.00
Total				4	3	0	1	12	5	+7	75.00

Last updated: 20 August 2023
Source: Soccerway

=== Primeira Liga ===
==== League table ====
Pos	Team	Pld	W	D	L	GF	GA	GD	Pts
11	Rio Ave	34	6	19	9	38	43	−5	37 (Note: Head-to-head points: Farense 4, Rio Ave 1.)
12	Gil Vicente	34	9	9	16	42	52	−10	36
13	Estoril	34	9	6	19	49	58	−9	33 (Note: Head-to-head away goals scored: Estoril 1, Estrela da Amadora 0.)
14	Estrela da Amadora	34	7	12	15	33	53	−20	33
15	Boavista	34	7	11	16	39	62	−23	32 (Note: Head-to-head points: Boavista 4, Portimonense 1.)

Source: Liga Portugal
Rules for classification: 1) Points; 2) Head-to-head points; 3) Head-to-head goal difference; 4) Head-to-head away goals scored; 5) Goal difference; 6) Matches won; 7) Goals scored; 8) Play-off.

==== Results summary ====
Overall								Home						Away					
Pld	W	D	L	GF	GA	GD	Pts	W	D	L	GF	GA	GD	W	D	L	GF	GA	GD
2	1	0	1	5	4	+1	3	1	0	0	2	0	+2	0	0	1	3	4	−1

Last updated: 20 August 2023.
Source: Liga Portugal

==== Results by round ====
Round	1	2	3
Ground	A	H	A
Result	L	W	
Position			

Updated to match(es) played on 20 August 2023. Source: Liga Portugal
A = Away; H = Home; W = Win; D = Draw; L = Loss

==== Matches ====
The league fixtures were unveiled on 5 July 2023.

13 August 2023 1	Arouca	4–3	Estoril	Arouca
20:30 UTC+1	Esgaio (yellow card) 4'; Sylla (yellow card) 10'; Mújica 20'; Kouassi (yellow card) 21' (yellow-red card); Cristo 57'; Feltes 73' (o.g.); Santos 90+6', (yellow card) 90+7'	Report	Holsgrove 10', (yellow card) 41'; J. Marques 49'; A. Marqués 70'; Gomes (yellow card) 90+10'	Stadium: Estádio Municipal; Referee: Hélder Carvalho

20 August 2023 2	Estoril	2–0	Rio Ave	Estoril
15:30 UTC+1	Vital (yellow card) 5'; Mangala 55'; Araújo (yellow card) 75'; Holsgrove (yellow card) 77'; Marqués (yellow card) 86', (goal) 90+8'	Report	Pantalon (yellow card) 21'; Boateng (yellow card) 90+5'	Stadium: Estadio António Coimbra da Mota; Attendance: 2,359; Referee: Iancu Vasilica

25 August 2023 3	Estrela da Amadora	v	Estoril	Amadora
20:15 UTC+1		Report		Stadium: Estádio José Gomes; Referee: José Bessa

7 October 2023 8	Estoril	0–1	Benfica	Estoril
20:30 WEST (UTC+1)	Cassiano (yellow card) 41'; Tavares (yellow card) 62'; Fernandes (yellow card) 70'	Report	Chiquinho (yellow card) 49'; A. Silva (yellow card) 61' (goal) 90+3'	Stadium: Estádio António Coimbra da Mota; Attendance: 4,966; Referee: André Narciso (Setúbal)

3 November 2023 10	Porto	0–1	Estoril	Porto
20:15 WET (UTC±00:00)		Report	Holsgrove 75'	Stadium: Estádio do Dragão; Attendance: 30,306; Referee: Tiago Martins

3 December 2023 12	Braga	3–1	Estoril	Braga
15:30 WEST (UTC+01:00)	R. Horta 31'; Banza 51'; Carné 90' (o.g.)	Report	Guitane 24'	Stadium: Estádio Municipal de Braga; Attendance: 12,902; Referee: Bruno Vieira

5 January 2024 16	Sporting CP	5–1	Estoril	Lisbon
18:45 WET (UTC±00:00)	Edwards 21', 45+2'; Álvaro 51' (o.g.); Gonçalves 60'; Trincão 78'	Report	Cassiano 82'	Stadium: Estádio José Alvalade; Attendance: 37,483; Referee: Cláudio Pereira

10 March 2024 25	Benfica	v	Estoril	Lisbon
--:-- WET (UTC+0)				Stadium: Estádio da Luz

30 March 2024 27	Estoril	v	Porto	Estoril
--:-- WET (UTC±00:00)		Report		Stadium: Estádio António Coimbra da Mota

12 May 2024 33	Estoril	v	Sporting CP	Estoril
--:-- WEST (UTC+01:00)		Report		Stadium: Estádio António Coimbra da Mota

=== Taça de Portugal ===
22 October 2023 Third round	Sintrense	0–5	Estoril	Sintra
			Rodrigo Gomes 34', 42'; Alejandro Marqués 54'; Bernardo Vital 73'; João Carlos 78'	Stadium: Estadio do Sport União Sintrense

26 November 2023 Fourth round	Estoril	2–1	Mafra	Estoril
	Heriberto Tavares 51'; Cassiano 82'		Diogo Almeida 28'	Stadium: Estádio António Coimbra da Mota

9 January 2024 Fifth round	Estoril	0–4	Porto	Estoril
20:45			Evanilson 24', 32' (pen.), 56'; Galeno 76'	Stadium: Estádio António Coimbra da Mota

=== Taça da Liga ===
==== Third round ====
Pos	Team	Pld	W	D	L	GF	GA	GD	Pts	Qualification	EST	POR	LEI
1	Estoril	2	2	0	0	5	2	+3	6	Advance to knockout phase	—	3–1	—
2	Porto	2	1	0	1	3	4	−1	3		—	—	2–1
3	Leixões	2	0	0	2	2	4	−2	0		1–2	—	—

Source: Liga Portugal
Rules for classification: Tiebreakers

27 September 2023 1	Leixões	1–2	Estoril	Matosinhos
20:45	Bolgado 8'	Report	Cassiano 3'; Tavares 62'	Stadium: Estádio do Mar; Attendance: 2,187; Referee: Hélder Carvalho

6 December 2023 2	Estoril	3–1	Porto	Estoril
18:00	Cassiano 22'; Guitane 90+1'; João Carlos 90+5' (pen.)	Report	Pepê 34'	Stadium: Estádio António Coimbra da Mota; Attendance: 2,684; Referee: Hélder Malheiro

==== Semi-final ====
24 January 2024	Benfica	1–1 (4–5 p)	Estoril	Estádio Dr. Magalhães Pessoa, Leiria
19:45 WET (UTC±00:00)	Otamendi 58'	Report	Guitane 16'	Attendance: 20,155; Referee: Cláudio Pereira
	Penalties
	João Mário (penalty scored); Marcos Leonardo (penalty missed); Otamendi (penalty scored); Cabral (penalty scored); Di María (penalty scored); Tomás Araújo (penalty missed)		(penalty scored) Guitane; (penalty scored) Marqués; (penalty scored) Ndiaye; (penalty missed) Marques; (penalty scored) Tiago Araújo; (penalty scored) Vital

==== Final ====
27 January 2024	Braga	1–1 (5–4 p)	Estoril	Estádio Dr. Magalhães Pessoa, Leiria
19:45 WET (UTC±00:00)	Horta 20'	Report	Cassiano 6' (pen.)	Attendance: 18,989; Referee: Fábio Veríssimo
	Penalties
	Horta (penalty scored); Moutinho (penalty scored); Ruiz (penalty scored); Pizzi (penalty scored); Al-Musrati (penalty scored)		(penalty scored) Feltes; (penalty scored) Marqués; (penalty scored) Tavares; (penalty scored) Pina; (penalty missed) Araújo
