= 2022–23 G.D. Estoril Praia season =

G.D. Estoril Praia
2022–23 season
- Owner: Globalon Football Holdings S.L
- President: Ignacio Beristain
- Head coach: Nélson Veríssimo
- Stadium: Estádio António Coimbra da Mota
- Primeira Liga: 14th
- Taça de Portugal: Fourth round
- Taça da Liga: Group stage

The 2022–23 season is the 84th in the history of G.D. Estoril Praia and their second consecutive season in the top flight. The club will participate in the Primeira Liga, the Taça de Portugal, and the Taça da Liga.

== Players ==
As of 22 July 2022

Note: Flags indicate national team as defined under FIFA eligibility rules; some limited exceptions apply. Players may hold more than one non-FIFA nationality.

No.	Pos.	Nation	Player
3	DF	POR	Bernardo Vital
4	DF	BRA	Lucas Áfrico
5	DF	BRA	Volnei Feltes
6	MF	POR	Francisco Geraldes
7	FW	POR	Rodrigo Martins
8	MF	POR	Serginho
9	FW	COL	Leonardo Acevedo
10	MF	POR	André Franco
11	FW	BRA	Arthur Gomes
12	GK	BRA	Thiago
14	DF	SEN	Racine Coly
17	FW	TUN	Elias Achouri

No.	Pos.	Nation	Player
19	MF	POR	Afonso Valente
20	MF	POR	Duarte Carvalho
22	MF	FRA	Titouan Thomas
23	DF	POR	Pedro Álvaro
29	FW	CPV	Gilson Tavares
31	DF	POR	Joãozinho (Captain)
32	MF	FRA	Loreintz Rosier
50	FW	BRA	João Carlos
78	MF	POR	Tiago Araújo
87	DF	POR	Gonçalo Esteves (on loan from Sporting CP)
99	GK	POR	Dani Figueira
—	MF	CMR	James Léa Siliki

== Pre-season and friendlies ==
Win Draw Loss Fixtures

9 July 2022 Friendly	Sporting CP (Portugal)	4–0	(Portugal) Estoril	Alcochete
10:00 WEST (UTC+1)	Reis; Santos; Gonçalves; Chermiti			Stadium: Stadium Aurélio Pereira
Note: Match was played in two 35-minute halves.

16 July 2022 Friendly	Estoril (Portugal)	1–0	(Portugal) Mafra	Estoril
10:30 WEST (UTC+1)	Goal			Stadium: Estádio António Coimbra da Mota

16 July 2022 Friendly	Estoril (Portugal)	1–4	(England) Brighton & Hove Albion	Lisbon
18:30 WEST (UTC+1)	Martins 23'		Maupay 1', 12'; Mitoma 65'; Undav 85'	Stadium: Estadio Pina Manique

20 July 2022 Friendly	Estrela da Amadora (Portugal)	1–3	(Portugal) Estoril	Alcabideche
10:00 WEST (UTC+1)	Aloísio Souza		Franco; Acevedo; Arthur	Stadium: Centro de Excelência do Estoril

24 July 2022 Friendly	Estoril (Portugal)	1–3	(England) Fulham	Estoril
17:45 WEST (UTC+1)	Franco 34' (pen.)		Mitrović 7', 11'; Palhinha 24'	Stadium: Estádio António Coimbra da Mota

30 July 2022 Friendly	Estoril (Portugal)	3–2	(Portugal) Casa Pia	Estoril
10:30 WEST (UTC+1)	Léa Siliki 41'; Gouveia 44', 52'		Godwin 26', 70'	Stadium: Estádio António Coimbra da Mota

30 July 2022 Friendly	Vilafranquense (Portugal)	2–1	(Portugal) Estoril	Vila Franca de Xira
18:00 WEST (UTC+1)	Sangaré 81'; Martins 90+5'		João Carlos 44'	Stadium: Campo do Cevadeiro

24 September 2022 Friendly	Estoril (Portugal)	4–2	(Portugal) Estrela da Amadora	Estoril
--:-- WEST (UTC+1)	Marqués; Pinto (o.g.); Geraldes (pen.)	Report	Silva	Stadium: Estádio António Coimbra da Mota

== Competitions ==
=== Overall record ===
Competition	First match	Last match	Starting round	Record							
Competition	First match	Last match	Starting round	Pld	W	D	L	GF	GA	GD	Win %
Primeira Liga	6 August 2022	May 2023	Matchday 1	11	4	4	3	12	10	+2	36.36
Taça de Portugal				0	0	0	0	0	0	+0	—
Taça da Liga				0	0	0	0	0	0	+0	—
Total				11	4	4	3	12	10	+2	36.36

Last updated: 30 October 2022
Source: Soccerway

=== Primeira Liga ===
==== League table ====
Pos	Team	Pld	W	D	L	GF	GA	GD	Pts	Qualification or relegation
12	Rio Ave	34	10	10	14	36	43	−7	40 (Note: Vizela finished ahead of Rio Ave on head-to-head points: Rio Ave 0–1 Vizela, Vizela 3–1 Rio Ave.)	
13	Gil Vicente	34	10	7	17	32	41	−9	37	
14	Estoril	34	10	5	19	33	49	−16	35	
15	Portimonense	34	10	4	20	25	48	−23	34	
16	Marítimo (R)	34	7	5	22	32	63	−31	26	Qualification for the relegation play-offs

Source: Liga Portugal
Rules for classification: 1) Points; 2) Head-to-head points; 3) Head-to-head goal difference; 4) Goal difference; 5) Matches won; 6) Goals scored; 7) Play-off.
(R) Relegated

==== Results summary ====
Overall								Home						Away					
Pld	W	D	L	GF	GA	GD	Pts	W	D	L	GF	GA	GD	W	D	L	GF	GA	GD
34	10	5	19	33	49	−16	35	7	2	8	20	24	−4	3	3	11	13	25	−12

Last updated: 27 May 2023.
Source: Liga Portugal

==== Results by round ====
Round	1	2	3	4	5	6	7	8	9	10	11	12	13	14	15	16	17	18	19	20	21	22	23	24	25	26	27	28	29	30	31	32	33	34
Ground	H	A	H	A	H	A	H	A	A	H	A	H	A	H	A	H	A	A	H	A	H	A	H	A	H	H	A	H	A	H	A	H	A	H
Result	W	L	D	W	L	W	D	D	W	L	D	L	L	W	L	W	L	L	L	L	L	L	L	L	L	W	L	L	L	W	L	W	D	W
Position	3	8	8	5	8	8	7	8	7	8	8	10	12	8	12	8	8	10	12	14	15	15	15	15	15	15	15	15	15	15	15	14	14	14

Updated to match(es) played on 27 May 2023. Source: Liga Portugal
A = Away; H = Home; W = Win; D = Draw; L = Loss

==== Matches ====
The league fixtures were announced on 5 July 2022.

6 August 2022 1	Estoril	2–0	Famalicão	Estoril
18:00 WEST (UTC+1)	Geraldes 20'; Arthur 45'	Report		Stadium: Estádio António Coimbra da Mota; Attendance: 1,473; Referee: Nuno Almeida

14 August 2022 2	Vitória de Guimarães	1–0	Estoril	Guimarães
20:30 WEST (UTC+1)	Silva 16'	Report		Stadium: Estádio D. Afonso Henriques; Attendance: 15,652; Referee: Claúdio Pereira

19 August 2022 3	Estoril	2–2	Rio Ave	Estoril
20:15 WEST (UTC+1)	Gouveia 6'; Arthur 80'	Report	Costinha 61'; Aziz 72'	Stadium: Estádio António Coimbra da Mota; Attendance: 1,742; Referee: Vítor Ferreira

26 August 2022 4	Paços de Ferreira	0–3	Estoril	Paços de Ferreira
20:15 WEST (UTC+1)		Report	Carlos 26' 43'; Siliki 72'	Stadium: Estádio da Mata Real; Attendance: 2,469; Referee: Carlos Macedo

2 September 2022 5	Estoril	0–2	Sporting CP	Estoril
21:15 WEST (UTC+01:00)		Report	Juste 13'; Edwards 21'	Stadium: Estádio António Coimbra da Mota; Attendance: 4,718; Referee: Manuel Oliveira

12 September 2022 6	Vizela	0–1	Estoril	Vizela
20:15 WEST (UTC+1)		Report	Erison 27'	Stadium: Estádio do FC Vizela; Attendance: 2,335; Referee: Manuel Mota

17 September 2022 7	Estoril	1–1	Porto	Estoril
18:00 WEST (UTC+01:00)	Gouveia 41'	Report	Taremi 90+8' (pen.)	Stadium: Estádio António Coimbra da Mota; Attendance: 4,438; Referee: Luís Godinho

1 October 2022 8	Chaves	1–1	Estoril	Chaves
18:00 WEST (UTC+1)	Héctor 39'	Report	Martins 76'	Stadium: Estádio Municipal de Chaves; Attendance: 3,345; Referee: Fábio Veríssimo

7 October 2022 9	Gil Vicente	0–1	Estoril	Barcelos
20:15 WEST (UTC+1)		Report	Siliki 90+6'	Stadium: Estádio Cidade de Barcelos; Attendance: 2,516; Referee: Hélder Carvalho

22 October 2022 10	Estoril	0–2	Braga	Estoril
18:00 WEST (UTC+1)		Report	Al-Musrati 10'; Vitinha 30'	Stadium: Estádio António Coimbra da Mota; Attendance: 2,674; Referee: André Narciso

30 October 2022 12	Portimonense	1–1	Estoril	Portimão
15:30 WEST (UTC+01:00)	Welinton Jr 88' (pen.)	Report	Erison 23'	Stadium: Estádio Municipal de Portimão; Attendance: 1,304; Referee: Gustavo Correia

=== Taça de Portugal ===
14 October 2022 Third round	Amora	2–3	Estoril	Amora
20:45 WEST (UTC+01:00)	Vieira 14'; Duque 90'	Report	Carvalho 57'; Siliki 63'; Erison 82'	Stadium: Estádio da Medideira; Referee: Antonio Nobre

9 November 2022 Fourth round	Estoril	0–1	Benfica	Estoril
20:45 WEST (UTC+01:00)		Report	Neres 66'	Stadium: Estádio António Coimbra da Mota; Referee: Fábio Veríssimo
