= Finn Dicke =

Dutch footballer (born 2004)

Personal information
- Full name: Finn Jesper Dicke
- Date of birth: 14 September 2004 (age 22)
- Place of birth: The Hague, Netherlands
- Height: 1.90 m (6 ft 3 in)
- Positions: Defensive midfielder; centre-back

Team information
- Current team: MVV
- Number: 3

Youth career
- –2013: HVV
- 2013–2021: ADO Den Haag

Senior career*
Years	Team	Apps	(Gls)
2022–2023	ADO Den Haag	1	(0)
2022–2023	→ Estoril (loan)	0	(0)
2023–2025	Estoril	0	(0)
2024–2025	→ Beveren (loan)	14	(0)
2025–	MVV	20	(0)

International career^{‡}
2021–2022	Netherlands U18	3	(0)
- * Club domestic league appearances and goals as of 28 April 2026 ‡ National team caps and goals as of 11 August 2023

Finn Jesper Dicke (born 14 September 2004) is a Dutch professional footballer who plays a defensive midfielder or centre-back for Eerste Divisie club MVV.

== Club career ==
=== ADO Den Haag ===
Dicke was born and raised in The Hague, Netherlands. Having first joined the youth set-up at the club in 2013, Dicke signed his first professional contract with his hometown club ADO Den Haag in January 2022, at the age of 17 years-old. The four-and-a-half year contract lasted until the end of the 2025–26 season. He made his Eerste Divisie debut on 6 May 2022 as a second-half substitute in a 3–0 away defeat against FC Emmen.

=== Estoril ===
In August 2022, Dicke joined Portuguese club Estoril on loan, with French midfield player Titouan Thomas moving on a season-long loan going in the opposite direction. He was assigned to the Under-23 squad in Liga Revelação. In January 2023, Estoril made the transfer permanent and signed a contract with Dicke until 2027.

==== Beveren (loan) ====
He signed for Belgian club S.K. Beveren of the Challenger Pro League on a season-long loan in August 2024. Beveren General manager Bob Peeters speaking about the deal we quoted as saying "Dicke has a lot of interesting qualities for a defensive midfielder" saying that he "combines defensive strength with strong footballing ability, which enables him to bring balance to a team" adding that "Dicke is a smart footballer who thinks ahead and is also strong in the air".

Dicke made his debut for the club on 31 August 2024, appearing as a 73rd-minute substitute for Sander Coopman against RFC Liège in a 0–0 draw, in the Challenger Pro League.

=== MVV ===
On 3 September 2025, Dicke returned to the Netherlands to sign a one-year contract, with an option for a further year, with Eerste Divisie club MVV. He made his debut on 12 September, coming on as an 82nd-minute substitute for Mats Kuipers in a 1–0 home defeat to Cambuur. On 21 September, Dicke made his first start for the club in a derby against VVV-Venlo, but was forced off with an injury in the 40th minute, as MVV lost 1–0.

== International career ==
Dicke was called up to the Netherlands under-18 squad in spring 2022.

== Career statistics ==
As of match played 20 December 2025

Appearances and goals by club, season and competition
Club	Season	League			National cup		Other		Total	
Club	Season	Division	Apps	Goals	Apps	Goals	Apps	Goals	Apps	Goals
ADO Den Haag	2021–22	Eerste Divisie	1	0	0	0	—		1	0
Estoril	2023–24	Primeira Liga	0	0	2	0	—		2	0
Beveren (loan)	2024–25	Challenger Pro League	14	0	2	0	—		16	0
MVV	2025–26	Eerste Divisie	9	0	0	0	—		9	0
Career total			24	0	4	0	0	0	28	0
