= 2021–22 F.C. Arouca season =

F.C. Arouca
2021–22 season
- Chairman: Carlos Pinho
- Manager: Armando Evangelista
- Stadium: Estádio Municipal
- Primeira Liga: 15th
- Taça de Portugal: Third round
- Taça da Liga: Second round
- Top goalscorer: League: André Silva (9); All: André Silva (10)
Home colours	Away colours	Third colours

The 2021–22 season was the 71st season in the existence of F.C. Arouca and the club's return to the top flight after promotion from Liga Portugal 2 of Portuguese football. In addition to the domestic league, Arouca participated in this season's editions of the Taça de Portugal and the Taça da Liga.

== Players ==
=== First-team squad ===
As of 18 February 2022

Note: Flags indicate national team as defined under FIFA eligibility rules; some limited exceptions apply. Players may hold more than one non-FIFA nationality.

No.	Pos.	Nation	Player
1	GK	BRA	Victor Braga
3	DF	BRA	Brunão
4	DF	VEN	José Manuel Velázquez
5	MF	POR	David Simão
6	DF	BRA	Mateus Quaresma
7	FW	BRA	André Silva
8	FW	POR	Arsénio
10	FW	COD	André Bukia
11	FW	BRA	Adílio
12	GK	LTU	Emilijus Zubas
13	DF	BRA	João Basso
14	MF	POR	Pité
15	FW	PLE	Oday Dabbagh
17	MF	GHA	Yaw Moses
18	MF	CIV	Eboue Kouassi (on loan from Genk)

No.	Pos.	Nation	Player
19	FW	ISR	Or Dasa
20	MF	POR	Pedro Moreira
21	MF	POR	Leandro Silva
22	FW	ARG	Alan Ruiz
23	MF	BRA	Wellington Nem
27	MF	BRA	Antony
30	GK	CMR	Norbert Haymamba
31	DF	POR	Tiago Esgaio (on loan from Braga)
44	DF	CRO	Nino Galović
53	DF	SEN	Abdoulaye Ba
60	MF	CPV	Marco Soares
72	DF	BRA	Thales
78	FW	POR	Tiago Araújo (on loan from Benfica)
97	GK	BRA	Fernando Castro
99	FW	BRA	Bruno Marques (on loan from Santos)

=== Out on loan ===
Note: Flags indicate national team as defined under FIFA eligibility rules; some limited exceptions apply. Players may hold more than one non-FIFA nationality.

No.	Pos.	Nation	Player
—	FW	BRA	Heliardo (at Varzim until 30 June 2022)

== Pre-season and friendlies ==
Win Draw Loss Fixtures

== Competitions ==
=== Overall record ===
Competition	First match	Last match	Starting round	Final position	Record							
Competition	First match	Last match	Starting round	Final position	Pld	W	D	L	GF	GA	GD	Win %
Primeira Liga	7 August 2021	15 May 2022	Matchday 1	15th	34	7	10	17	30	54	−24	20.59
Taça de Portugal	17 October 2021		Third round	Third round	1	0	1	0	1	1	+0	0.00
Taça da Liga	25 July 2021	1 August 2021	First round	Second round	2	1	0	1	3	1	+2	50.00
Total					37	8	11	18	34	56	−22	21.62

Source: Soccerway

=== Primeira Liga ===
==== League table ====
Pos	Team	Pld	W	D	L	GF	GA	GD	Pts	Qualification or relegation
13	Portimonense	34	10	8	16	31	45	−14	38 (Note: Head-to-head points: Marítimo 10, Paços de Ferreira 8, Boavista 7, Portimonense 6.)	
14	Vizela	34	7	12	15	37	58	−21	33	
15	Arouca	34	7	10	17	30	54	−24	31	
16	Moreirense (R)	34	7	8	19	33	51	−18	29	Qualification for the Relegation play-offs
17	Tondela (R)	34	7	7	20	41	67	−26	28	Relegation to Liga Portugal 2

Source: Liga Portugal
Rules for classification: 1) Points; 2) Head-to-head points; 3) Head-to-head goal difference; 4) Head-to-head away goals scored; 5) Goal difference; 6) Matches won; 7) Goals scored; 8) Play-off.
(R) Relegated

==== Results summary ====
Overall								Home						Away					
Pld	W	D	L	GF	GA	GD	Pts	W	D	L	GF	GA	GD	W	D	L	GF	GA	GD
34	7	10	17	30	54	−24	31	5	4	8	15	29	−14	2	6	9	15	25	−10

Source: Liga Portugal

==== Results by round ====
Round	1	2	3	4	5	6	7	8	9	10	11	12	13	14	15	16	17	18	19	20	21	22	23	24	25	26	27	28	29	30	31	32	33	34
Ground	H	A	H	A	A	H	A	H	A	H	A	H	A	H	A	H	A	A	H	A	H	H	A	H	A	H	A	H	A	H	A	H	A	H
Result	L	L	W	L	D	D	L	L	D	W	D	W	L	L	D	L	L	W	L	D	L	L	W	D	L	L	D	W	L	D	L	W	L	D
Position	12	18	13	15	13	13	15	16	16	12	13	9	10	12	13	14	17	14	14	15	16	17	15	15	15	15	15	15	15	15	15	15	15	15

Source: Liga Portugal
A = Away; H = Home; W = Win; D = Draw; L = Loss

==== Matches ====
7 August 2021 1	Arouca	0–2	Estoril	Arouca
12:45 WEST (UTC+1)		Report	Franco 4'; Meshino 90+6'	Stadium: Estádio Municipal de Arouca; Attendance: 513; Referee: Hugo Silva

14 August 2021 2	Benfica	2–0	Arouca	Lisbon
18:00 WEST (UTC+1)	Waldschmidt 38'; Yaremchuk 44'; Morato (yellow card) 85'	Report	Braga (red card) 8'	Stadium: Estádio da Luz; Attendance: 13,973; Referee: Manuel Mota

20 August 2021 3	Arouca	2–1	Famalicão	Arouca
19:00 WEST (UTC+1)	Basso 66' (pen.); Silva 89'	Report	Rodrigues 23'	Stadium: Estádio Municipal de Arouca; Attendance: 648; Referee: David Silva

28 August 2021 4	Porto	3–0	Arouca	Porto
18:00 WEST (UTC+1)	Uribe 24'; Taremi 34'; Marcano 63'	Report		Stadium: Estádio do Dragão; Attendance: 12,588; Referee: Hélder Malheiro

13 September 2021 5	Marítimo	2–2	Arouca	Funchal
19:00 WEST (UTC+1)	André Vidigal (yellow card) 7' (yellow-red card) 87'; Ricardinho 35'; Xadas (yellow card) 36'; Alipour 45+11' (pen.); Rossi (yellow card) 49'; Vítor Costa (yellow card) 90+1'	Report	Bukia 8'; L. Silva (yellow card) 36'; A. Silva (yellow card) 45+3', (goal) 82'; Araújo (yellow card) 47'; Basso (yellow card) 61'; Kouassi (yellow card) 85'; Dabbagh (yellow card) 90+5'	Stadium: Estádio do Marítimo; Attendance: 2,056; Referee: Manuel Oliveira

18 September 2021 6	Arouca	2–2	Vitória de Guimarães	Arouca
20:30 WEST (UTC+1)	Thales (yellow card) 54'; Dabbagh 75'; Pité 90+4'	Report	Quaresma 7', (yellow card) 37'; Fernandes (yellow card) 23'; Tiago Silva 72'	Stadium: Estádio Municipal de Arouca; Attendance: 1,589; Referee: Nuno Miguel Serrano Almeida

25 September 2021 7	Moreirense	2–1	Arouca	Moreira de Cónegos
15:30 WEST (UTC+1)	Walterson (yellow card) 25', (goal) 29'; Vitória (yellow card) 61'; André Luis 64'; Lacerda (yellow card) 74'; Pires (yellow card) 78'; Kewin (yellow card) 90+3'	Report	Ba (yellow card) 15'; A. Silva 82'; Kouassi (yellow card) 90+3'	Stadium: Parque de Jogos Comendador Joaquim de Almeida Freitas; Attendance: 863; Referee: Fábio Melo

2 October 2021 8	Arouca	1–2	Sporting CP	Arouca
20:30 WEST (UTC+1)	Arsénio (yellow card) 45+1'; Dabbagh 51'; L. Silva (yellow card) 63'; Araújo (yellow card) 85'	Report	Nunes 14'; Sarabia (yellow card) 45'; Nuno Santos 54'; Paulinho (yellow card) 62'; Porro (yellow card) 63'; Bragança (yellow card) 77'; Tomás (yellow card) 90+3'	Stadium: Estádio Municipal de Arouca; Attendance: 3,338; Referee: Rui Costa

24 October 2021 9	Paços de Ferreira	0–0	Arouca	Paços de Ferreira
15:30 WEST (UTC+1)	Nuno Santos (yellow card) 14' (yellow-red card) 55'; Denílson (yellow card) 53'; Hélder Ferreira (yellow card) 57'; Antunes (yellow card) 68'; Delgado (yellow card) 88'; Ibrahim (yellow card) 90+7'	Report	Arsénio (yellow card) 33'; João Basso (yellow card) 90+7'	Stadium: Estádio da Mata Real; Attendance: 1,886; Referee: António Nobre

29 October 2021 10	Arouca	2–0	Tondela	Arouca
20:15 WEST (UTC+1)	Basso 31' (pen.); Bukia 68'	Report		Stadium: Estádio Municipal de Arouca; Attendance: 574; Referee: Luís Godinho

5 November 2021 11	Gil Vicente	1–1	Arouca	Barcelos
19:00 WEST (UTC+1)	Navarro 47'; Talocha (yellow card) 70'	Report	Arsénio 16'; Quaresma (yellow card) 22'; A. Silva (yellow card) 35' (yellow-red card) 83'; Moreira (yellow card) 66'; Kouassi (yellow card) 77'	Stadium: Estádio Cidade de Barcelos; Attendance: 1,694; Referee: Hélder Malheiro

27 November 2021 12	Arouca	2–1	Boavista	Arouca
18:00 WET (UTC±0)	Dabbagh 11', (yellow card) 49'; Bukia (yellow card) 68'; Campi (yellow card) 69'; Antony 90+1'	Report	Yusupha (yellow card) 28'; Vukotić (yellow card) 36'; Musa 54'; Makouta (yellow card) 71'; Malheiro (yellow card) 89'	Stadium: Estádio Municipal de Arouca; Attendance: 988; Referee: João Pinheiro

5 December 2021 13	Santa Clara	2–1	Arouca	Ponta Delgada
14:30 WEST (UTC+1)	Crysan 21', 45+5'; Marco (yellow card) 47'; Nené (yellow card) 49'; Ramos (yellow card) 58'; Boateng (yellow card) 63'	Report	Quaresma (yellow card) 16'; Arsénio 45+1', (yellow card) 90+4'; Eugeni (yellow card) 70'; Campi (yellow card) 90+1'	Stadium: Estádio de São Miguel; Attendance: 687; Referee: António Nobre

13 December 2021 14	Arouca	1–4	Vizela	Arouca
20:15 WET (UTC±0)	A. Silva (yellow card) 14'; Bukia 61'; Araújo (yellow card) 90+1'	Report	Zag (yellow card) 5'; Samu 9'; Ba 16' (o.g.); Guilherme 19', 38', (yellow card) 63'; Ofori (yellow card) 42'; Kouao (yellow card) 61'	Stadium: Estádio Municipal de Arouca; Attendance: 723; Referee: Tiago Martins

18 December 2021 15	Portimonense	1–1	Arouca	Portimão
15:30 WEST (UTC+1)	Willyan (yellow card) 11'; Candé (yellow card) 69'; Luquinha 70'; Carlinhos (yellow card) 88'	Report	A. Silva 51'; Bukia (yellow card) 21'; Campi (yellow card) 81'; Leandro (yellow card) 87'; Kouassi (yellow card) 88'	Stadium: Estádio Municipal de Portimão; Attendance: 767; Referee: Miguel Nogueira

30 December 2021 16	Arouca	0–6	Braga	Arouca
19:00 WET (UTC±0)		Report	V. Oliveira 6', 12', 26'; Medeiros 70' (pen.); Fernandes 75', 79'	Stadium: Estádio Municipal de Arouca; Attendance: 622; Referee: Manuel Oliveira

9 January 2022 17	Belenenses SAD	2–1	Arouca	Oeiras
20:30 WEST (UTC+1)	Phete (yellow card) 11' (yellow-red card) 18'; Sithole (yellow card) 45+2'; A. Sousa (yellow card) 53'; Calila (yellow card) 57'; Nuno (yellow card) 65'; Safira (yellow card) 70'; Nilton 73'; Tavares (yellow card) 86'; Camará 90+3'; Ramalho (yellow card) 90+5'	Report	A. Silva (red card) 6'; Dabbagh 37', (yellow card) 59' (yellow-red card) 76'; Arsénio (yellow card) 43'	Stadium: Estádio Nacional; Attendance: 323; Referee: David Silva

21 January 2022 19	Arouca	0–2	Benfica	Arouca
19:00 WET (UTC±00:00)	Basso (penalty missed) 41'; Adílio (yellow card) 46'; Moreira (yellow card) 56'; Quaresma (yellow card) 90+1'; Ba (yellow card) 90+3'; Kouassi (yellow card) 90+5'	Report	Núñez 32' (pen.); Grimaldo (yellow card) 43'; Ramos 90+2'	Stadium: Estádio Municipal de Arouca; Attendance: 2,387; Referee: Nuno Almeida

27 January 2022 18	Estoril Praia	1–2	Arouca	Estoril
20:30 WEST (UTC+1)	Ba 6' (o.g.); Joãozinho (yellow card) 26'; André Franco (yellow card) 67'; Francisco Geraldes (yellow card) 90+6'	Report	Ba (yellow card) 54'; Pedro Moreira (yellow card) 75'; A. Silva 89'; Kouassi 90+7'	Stadium: Estádio António Coimbra da Mota; Attendance: 458; Referee: Manuel Oliveira

31 January 2022 20	Famalicão	0–0	Arouca	Vila Nova de Famalicão
21:15 WEST (UTC+1)	Alex (yellow card) 75'; Adrián Marín (yellow card) 90+5'	Report	Basso (yellow card) 37'; Bukia (yellow card) 54'; Esgaio (yellow card) 59'	Stadium: Estádio Municipal 22 de Junho; Attendance: 2,760; Referee: Fábio Veríssimo

6 February 2022 21	Arouca	0–2	Porto	Arouca
18:00 WET (UTC±0)	Kouassi (yellow card) 1'; Basso (yellow card) 45+3'; Pedro Moreira (yellow card) 61'; A. Silva (yellow card) 68'; Antony (yellow card) 90+10'	Report	Pepê (yellow card) 53'; Vitinha 54'; Mbemba 57'; Zaidu (yellow card) 75'; Marchesín (yellow card) 90+3'; Eustáquio (yellow card) 90+7'	Stadium: Estádio Municipal de Arouca; Attendance: 3,753; Referee: Hélder Malheiro

14 February 2022 22	Arouca	0–3	Marítimo	Arouca
20:15 WET (UTC±0)	Ba (yellow card) 18'; Arsénio (yellow card) 24'	Report	Alipour 9', 79', (yellow card) 79'; Tagueu 27'; Henrique (yellow card) 47' (yellow-red card) 56'; Vítor Costa (yellow card) 51'	Stadium: Estádio Municipal de Arouca; Attendance: 347; Referee: Miguel Nogueira

19 February 2022 23	Vitória de Guimarães	1–3	Arouca	Guimarães
20:30 WEST (UTC+1)	Estupiñán 26'; Nelson (yellow card) 67'; Quaresma (yellow card) 79'; Janvier (yellow card) 86'; Fernandes (yellow card) 88'	Report	Basso 13'; Kouassi (yellow card) 28'; Antony 35'; Bukia 41'; Galović (yellow card) 49'; Simão (yellow card) 70'; Leandro Silva (yellow card) 89'	Stadium: Estádio D. Afonso Henriques; Attendance: 8,865; Referee: Artur Soares Dias

26 February 2022 24	Arouca	1–1	Moreirense	Arouca
20:30 WET (UTC±0)	Kouassi (yellow card) 67'; Marques 78', (yellow card) 85'; Arsénio (yellow card) 90+3'	Report	Yan 44'; Paulinho (yellow card) 45+3'; Pacheco (yellow card) 56' (yellow-red card) 65'	Stadium: Estádio Municipal de Arouca; Attendance: 1,154; Referee: João Pinheiro

5 March 2022 25	Sporting CP	2–0	Arouca	Lisbon
20:30 WET (UTC±0)	Slimani 46', 52'	Report		Stadium: Estádio José Alvalade; Attendance: 25,254; Referee: António Nobre

12 March 2022 26	Arouca	0–1	Paços de Ferreira	Arouca
18:00 WET (UTC±0)		Report	Gaitán 33'	Stadium: Estádio Municipal de Arouca; Attendance: 1,108; Referee: Rui Costa

19 March 2022 27	Tondela	2–2	Arouca	Tondela
15:30 WET (UTC±0)	Quaresma 16'; Agra 45+4'	Report	A. Silva 4', 69'	Stadium: Estádio João Cardoso; Attendance: 2,186; Referee: João Pinheiro

2 April 2022 28	Arouca	2–1	Gil Vicente	Arouca
18:00 WEST (UTC+1)	A. Silva 55', 59'	Report	Cunha 90+2'	Stadium: Estádio Municipal de Arouca; Attendance: 790; Referee: Fábio Veríssimo

9 April 2022 29	Boavista	1–0	Arouca	Porto
18:00 WEST (UTC+1)	Gorré 12'	Report		Stadium: Estádio do Bessa; Attendance: 10,128; Referee: Vítor Ferreira

15 April 2022 30	Arouca	1–1	Santa Clara	Arouca
15:30 WEST (UTC+1)	A. Silva 54'	Report	Tagawa 72'	Stadium: Estádio Municipal de Arouca; Attendance: 1,453; Referee: Manuel Oliveira

22 April 2022 31	Vizela	2–1	Arouca	Vizela
20:15 WEST (UTC+1)	Guilherme 38', 72'	Report	Ruiz 49'	Stadium: Estádio do FC Vizela; Attendance: 2,795; Referee: Artur Soares Dias

30 April 2022 32	Arouca	1–0	Portimonense	Arouca
15:00 WEST (UTC+1)	Simão 50'	Report		Stadium: Estádio Municipal de Arouca; Attendance: 1,791; Referee: Luís Godinho

8 May 2022 33	Braga	1–0	Arouca	Braga
18:00 WEST (UTC+1)	R. Horta 87'	Report		Stadium: Estádio Municipal de Braga; Attendance: 16,237; Referee: Tiago Martins

15 May 2022 34	Arouca	0–0	Belenenses SAD	Arouca
16:30 WEST (UTC+1)				Stadium: Estádio Municipal de Arouca

=== Taça de Portugal ===
17 October 2021 Third round	Leça	1–1 (a.e.t.) (2–1 p)	Arouca	Leça da Palmeira
15:00 WEST (UTC+1)	Barbosa 33'	Report	Kouassi 89'	Stadium: Estádio do Leça FC; Referee: João Pinheiro

=== Taça da Liga ===
25 July 2021 First round	Vilafranquense	0–3	Arouca	Rio Maior
17:30 WEST (UTC+1)		Report	Valderrama 6'; André Silva 30'; Basso 86' (o.g.)	Stadium: Estádio Municipal de Rio Maior; Attendance: 0 Referee: Fábio Melo

1 August 2021 Second round	Arouca	0–1	Rio Ave	Arouca
17:00 WEST (UTC+1)		Report	Santos 38'	Stadium: Estádio Municipal de Arouca; Attendance: 358; Referee: Miguel Nogueira
