= Cocada (footballer) =

Brazilian footballer and manager (born 1961)

Personal information
- Full name: Luiz Edmundo Lucas Corrêa
- Date of birth: April 16, 1961 (age 65)
- Place of birth: Campo Grande, Brazil
- Position: Defender

Senior career*
| Years | Team | Apps | (Gls) |
- Flamengo
- Vasco da Gama

Managerial career
- 2007: Taubaté
- * Club domestic league appearances and goals

Luiz Edmundo Lucas Corrêa, usually known as Cocada (born on April 16, 1961 in Campo Grande, Mato Grosso do Sul state) is a Brazilian former football defender. He is the brother of another footballer, Müller.

== Nickname ==
His nickname, Cocada, is the name of a Brazilian popular candy made with coconut. He earned this nickname because, one day after the 1988 Campeonato Carioca final, he offered cocadas to his Flamengo's rivals.

== Playing career ==
Cocada played eight matches for Flamengo in 1983. He won six matches and drew two, scoring two goals.

He has also played for Vasco da Gama. On June 22, 1988, he played the Campeonato Carioca final, against Flamengo. He replaced Vivinho at the 41st minute of the second half, and scored the only goal of the match (at the 44th minute), so Vasco won the competition. After scoring the goal, he insulted Flamengo's manager, Carlinhos, because he was released on free by him when was playing for Flamengo, and was sent off by the referee.

Cocada has also played for Santa Cruz.

== Post-football career ==
In 1999, he started his manager career, being trained by Luiz Felipe Scolari, who was Palmeiras' manager at the time. He was Vitória's assistant manager in 2005 and 2006. He left the club after Vitória lost the Campeonato Baiano championship to Colo-Colo. Cocada has also worked on Operário's under-20 section.

After retirement, he studied physical education. Cocada graduated in 2006.

He owns a football academy, where children from 10 to 16 years old can join.

On February 9, 2007, Cocada was hired as Taubaté's manager.

== Honors ==
=== Player ===
Flamengo

- Campeonato Brasileiro Série A: 1983

Vasco da Gama

- Campeonato Carioca: 1988
