= Luís Esteves =

Luís Esteves may refer to:

- Luis R. Esteves, Puerto Rican military officer
- Luís Esteves (footballer), Portuguese footballer
