= Rafik Guitane =

Algerian footballer (born 1999)

Personal information
- Date of birth: 26 May 1999 (age 27)
- Place of birth: Évreux, France
- Height: 1.70 m (5 ft 7 in)
- Positions: Attacking midfielder; winger

Team information
- Current team: Estoril
- Number: 99

Youth career
- 2005–2009: ALM Évreux
- 2009–2013: Évreux FC 27
- 2013–2017: Le Havre

Senior career*
Years	Team	Apps	(Gls)
2016–2017	Le Havre II	17	(0)
2017–2018	Le Havre	11	(1)
2018–2020	Rennes II	7	(0)
2018–2021	Rennes	2	(0)
2018	→ Le Havre (loan)	7	(1)
2018	→ Le Havre II (loan)	1	(0)
2020–2021	→ Marítimo (loan)	26	(0)
2021–2023	Reims	1	(0)
2021–2022	→ Marítimo (loan)	29	(4)
2022	Reims II	3	(1)
2023	→ Estoril (loan)	13	(0)
2023–	Estoril	84	(8)
2024	→ Braga (loan)	1	(0)

International career^{‡}
2015–2016	France U17	10	(2)
2016	France U18	5	(0)
2017–2018	France U19	10	(4)
2018–2019	France U20	2	(1)
2025–	Algeria	2	(0)
- * Club domestic league appearances and goals as of 25 May 2026 ‡ National team caps and goals as of 18:31, 28 January 2026 (UTC)

Rafik Guitane (born 26 May 1999) is a professional footballer who plays as an attacking midfielder or winger for Primeira Liga club Estoril Praia. Born in France, he plays for the Algeria national team.

== Career ==
=== Le Havre ===
Guitane signed his first professional contract with Le Havre on 21 July 2016 at the age of 17. Guitane made his professional debut with Le Havre in a 4–0 Coupe de France win over Saint-Colomban Locminé on 4 December 2016. He made his league debut on 19 September 2017 in a 1–0 home win against FC Sochaux-Montbéliard. His first professional goal came on 25 November, two minutes after coming off the bench in the 71st minute of a league game against Lens. Cutting inside from the right, Guitane fired a shot past opposing goalkeeper Jérémy Vachoux to secure a 1–0 victory.

=== Rennes ===
On 1 February 2018, Guitane was sold to Rennes for €10 million. He however spent the rest of the season on loan with Le Havre.

His first full season with Rennes, the 2018–19 season, was spoiled by injury, as he tore his anterior cruciate ligament in October 2018.

He returned to action in the 2019–20 season, and made his competitive debut for the club on 20 October 2019 in a 3–2 away loss to Monaco, coming off the bench for Hamari Traoré in the 88th minute. On 7 November, Guitane made his UEFA Europa League debut as a late substitute for Benjamin Bourigeaud in a 1–0 loss to CFR Cluj. He finished the season with four total appearances, as he struggled to find playing time.

==== Loan to Marítimo ====
On 12 August 2020, Guitane was sent on a one-season loan to Primeira Liga club Marítimo. He made his debut for the club on 20 September against Santa Clara, coming on as an 85th-minute substitute for Pedro Pelágio. He eventually managed to assert himself as a starter in the team, making 30 total appearances that season, as Marítimo finished 15th – just above the relegation spots.

=== Reims ===
On 30 August 2021, Guitane signed a permanent contract with Reims. He would, however, continue on loan with Marítimo for his second successive season.

=== Estoril ===
On 31 January 2023, Guitane returned to Portugal and joined Estoril on loan until the end of the 2022–23 season.

On 23 July 2023, Estoril announced the permanent signing of Guitane for an undisclosed fee. The midfielder signed a three-year contract and was handed the club's number 10 shirt. He was an important starter during the 2023-24 season as the club finished 13th in the league and reached the 2024 Taça da Liga final losing on penalties to Braga.

On 31 August 2024, Braga signed Guitane on a season loan with an option to make the transfer permanent for a €5 million fee. However, due to lack of game time he would return to Estoril on 1 January 2025. He would play once again for the club 4 days later coming on as a substitute in the second-half against Estrela da Amadora making an assist for the final goal in a 4–2 away win.

== International career ==
Guitane was born in France to an Algerian father and a Moroccan mother. He is eligible to play for the France, Algeria or Morocco national teams having previously represented France at youth international level. He was called up to the Algeria national team for the 2025 FIFA Arab Cup.

== Career statistics ==
=== Club ===
As of match played 6 September 2025

Appearances and goals by club, season and competition
Club	Season	League			National cup (Note: Includes Coupe de France, Taça de Portugal)		League cup (Note: Includes Taça da Liga)		Continental		Other		Total	
Club	Season	Division	Apps	Goals	Apps	Goals	Apps	Goals	Apps	Goals	Apps	Goals	Apps	Goals
Le Havre II	2015–16	CFA 2	2	0	–		–		–		–		2	0
Le Havre II	2016–17	CFA	12	0	–		–		–		–		12	0
Le Havre II	2017–18	National 2	4	0	–		–		–		–		4	0
Le Havre II	Total		18	0	–		–		–		–		18	0
Le Havre	2016–17	Ligue 2	0	0	1	1	0	0	—		—		1	1
Le Havre	2017–18	Ligue 2	18	2	0	0	0	0	—		1 (Note: Appearance in Ligue 2 promotion play-offs)	0	19	2
Le Havre	Total		18	2	1	1	0	0	—		1	0	20	3
Rennes II	2018–19	National 3	3	0	–		–		–		–		3	0
Rennes II	2019–20	National 3	4	0	–		–		–		–		4	0
Rennes II	Total		7	0	–		–		–		–		7	0
Rennes	2019–20	Ligue 1	2	0	0	0	0	0	2 (Note: Appearances in UEFA Europa League)	0	—		4	0
Marítimo (loan)	2020–21	Primeira Liga	26	0	4	0	–		–		–		30	0
Reims	2021–22	Ligue 1	0	0	0	0	–		–		–		0	0
Reims	2022–23	Ligue 1	1	0	2	1	–		–		–		3	1
Reims	Total		1	0	2	1	–		–		–		3	1
Marítimo (loan)	2021–22	Primeira Liga	29	4	1	1	0	0	–		–		30	5
Reims II	2022–23	National 2	3	1	–		–		–		–		3	1
Estoril (loan)	2022–23	Primeira Liga	13	0	0	0	0	0	–		–		13	0
Estoril	2023–24	Primeira Liga	33	5	3	0	5	2	–		–		41	7
Estoril	Total		46	5	3	0	5	2	–		–		54	7
Braga (loan)	2024–25	Primeira Liga	1	0	1	0	0	0	1	0	—		3	0
Estoril	2024–25	Primeira Liga	21	0	0	0	—		—		—		21	0
Estoril	2025–26	Primeira Liga	4	2	0	0	—		—		—		4	2
Estoril	Total		25	2	0	0	—		–		–		25	2
Career total			176	14	12	3	5	2	3	0	1	0	197	19
