= Carlos Daniel =

Portuguese footballer (born 1994)

Personal information
- Full name: Carlos Daniel Cevada Teixeira
- Date of birth: 11 July 1994 (age 32)
- Place of birth: Figueira da Foz, Portugal
- Height: 1.78 m (5 ft 10 in)
- Positions: Winger; attacking midfielder

Team information
- Current team: Al-Jabalain
- Number: 28

Youth career
- 2002–2004: Buarcos
- 2004–2005: Naval
- 2005–2007: Cova-Gala
- 2007–2009: Benfica
- 2009–2013: União Leiria

Senior career*
Years	Team	Apps	(Gls)
2011–2013	União Leiria	3	(0)
2012–2013	→ Tourizense (loan)	10	(1)
2013–2018	Marítimo B	136	(21)
2017	Marítimo	1	(0)
2018–2019	União Leiria	31	(9)
2019–2020	Fátima	18	(2)
2020	Beira-Mar	7	(1)
2020–2021	Mafra	31	(2)
2021–2022	Wisła Puławy	33	(10)
2022–2024	Nacional	65	(14)
2024–2026	Marítimo	63	(17)
2026–	Al-Jabalain	1	(0)

International career
2011	Portugal U17	7	(2)
2012	Portugal U18	7	(1)
2012	Portugal U19	2	(0)
- * Club domestic league appearances and goals as of 02:59, 25 August 2026 (UTC)

Carlos Daniel Cevada Teixeira (born 11 July 1994) is a Portuguese professional footballer who plays as a winger or an attacking midfielder for Saudi First Division League club Al-Jabalain.

== Club career ==
Born in Figueira da Foz, Coimbra District, Daniel joined U.D. Leiria's youth system in 2009. On 14 May 2011, aged 16 years, 10 months and 3 days, he became the second youngest player to ever appear as a professional for the club, featuring eight minutes in a 3–3 Primeira Liga away draw against S.L. Benfica, whom he also represented for two years as a youth.

Daniel spent the second half of the 2012–13 season on loan at G.D. Tourizense, in the third division. Subsequently, he signed with C.S. Marítimo's reserves who competed in the Segunda Liga.

Daniel only played one competitive match with the first team during his spell at the Estádio do Marítimo, when he came on as a last-minute substitute in the 3–1 home win over F.C. Paços de Ferreira on 15 January 2017. He alternated between divisions two and three after leaving in the summer of 2018, representing in quick succession Leiria, C.D. Fátima, S.C. Beira-Mar and C.D. Mafra.

On 9 July 2021, aged 27, Daniel moved abroad for the only time, agreeing to a two-year contract at Wisła Puławy in the Polish II liga. He returned to Portugal in summer 2022, joining second-tier C.D. Nacional on a deal of the same duration.

On 18 July 2024, Daniel rejoined Marítimo by signing a three-year contract. In December 2025, he was voted second-division Player of the Month for November after scoring five goals in four games to help his team to as many wins; he repeated the feat in January 2026, totalling a goal and two assists.

Daniel and Marítimo eventually won the league. He left Portugal for the second time on 14 August 2026, moving to Saudi First Division League's Al-Jabalain Club.

== Honours ==
Marítimo

- Liga Portugal 2: 2025–26
