= Ricardo Schutte =

Portuguese footballer

Personal information
- Full name: André Ricardo Ferreira Schutte
- Date of birth: 31 January 1998 (age 28)
- Place of birth: Ribeira Brava, Portugal
- Height: 1.83 m (6 ft 0 in)
- Position: Forward

Team information
- Current team: Penafiel
- Number: 28

Youth career
- 2007–2008: Ribeira Brava
- 2008–2011: Porto
- 2011–2012: Dragon Force
- 2012–2017: Rio Ave

Senior career*
Years	Team	Apps	(Gls)
2017–2018	Rio Ave B	26	(11)
2018–2022	Rio Ave	1	(0)
2020–2021	→ Mirandés (loan)	12	(0)
2022	Estrela da Amadora	10	(0)
2022–2023	UD Logroñés	29	(1)
2023–2025	Oliveirense	23	(4)
2025–2026	Vizela	16	(1)
2026–	Penafiel	13	(0)
- * Club domestic league appearances and goals as of 20 June 2026

André Ricardo Ferreira Schutte (born 31 January 1998) is a Portuguese professional footballer who plays as a forward for Liga Portugal 2 club Penafiel.

== Club career ==
Born in Ribeira Brava, Madeira, Schutte represented CD Ribeira Brava, FC Porto, EF Dragon Force and Rio Ave FC as a youth. In 2017, after finishing his formation, he was promoted to the B-team, playing in the Porto Football Association's Elite Division.

After scoring 11 goals for the B's, Schutte was promoted to the first team in July 2018, and made his professional debut on 2 August, coming on as a late substitute for Leandrinho in a 4–4 UEFA Europa League home draw against Jagiellonia Białystok. He made his Primeira Liga debut on 2 December of the following year, replacing Bruno Moreira in a 0–2 loss at SC Braga.

On 24 August 2020, Schutte moved abroad and joined the Spanish Segunda División side CD Mirandés on a one-year loan.

On 21 July 2022, Schutte signed a two-year contract with UD Logroñés in the Spanish third-tier Primera Federación.

On 16 July 2023, Schutte returned to Portugal, signing for Liga Portugal 2 club Oliveirense. On 17 January 2025, Schutte signed a two-and-a-half-year contract with fellow Liga Portugal 2 side Vizela. One year later, he joined another Liga Portugal 2 club, this time Penafiel, signing a contract until June 2027.

== International career ==
Born in Portugal to a Portuguese mother and a South African father, Schutte can represent both nations internationally.
