= Tiago Gouveia =

Portuguese footballer (born 2001)

Personal information
- Full name: Tiago Maria Antunes Gouveia
- Date of birth: 18 June 2001 (age 25)
- Place of birth: Cascais, Portugal
- Height: 1.76 m (5 ft 9 in)
- Position: Right winger

Team information
- Current team: Gençlerbirliği (on loan from Benfica)
- Number: 7

Youth career
- 2009–2013: Tires
- 2013–2017: Sporting CP
- 2017–2020: Benfica

Senior career*
Years	Team	Apps	(Gls)
2019–	Benfica B	50	(12)
2022–	Benfica	19	(3)
2022–2023	→ Estoril (loan)	29	(5)
2025–2026	→ Nice (loan)	15	(0)
2026–	→ Gençlerbirliği (loan)	0	(0)

International career^{‡}
2016	Portugal U15	2	(1)
2016–2017	Portugal U16	8	(4)
2017–2018	Portugal U17	4	(0)
2018–2019	Portugal U18	6	(2)
2019	Portugal U19	9	(3)
2022	Portugal U21	2	(0)
- * Club domestic league appearances and goals as of 17 May 2026 ‡ National team caps and goals as of 4 July 2023

Tiago Maria Antunes Gouveia (born 18 June 2001) is a Portuguese professional footballer who plays as a right winger for Süper Lig club Gençlerbirliği, on loan from Primeira Liga club Benfica.

== Club career ==
Born in Cascais, Lisbon District, Gouveia played for Tires and Sporting CP at youth level, before joining Benfica's academy in 2017, aged 16.

On 10 November 2019, Gouveia made his professional debut for Benfica's B team, in the second division, coming off the bench to replace Tiago Dantas in the 72nd minute of a 1–1 draw away at Penafiel. On 26 April 2021, he scored his first goal for Benfica B, the opener in a 2–2 league draw at home to Penafiel.

On 30 April 2022, Gouveia made his debut for Benfica's main team, coming off the bench to replace João Mário on the 72nd minute of a 1–0 victory away at Marítimo, in the Primeira Liga.

On 27 July 2022, Benfica sent Gouveia on a season-long loan to fellow Primeira Liga club Estoril. He made his debut for the side on 6 August, starting in a 2–0 league victory at home to Famalicão, impressing by being involved in the first goal and assisting the second. Two weeks later, Gouveia scored his first Primeira Liga goal and first goal for Estoril, in a 2–2 draw at home to Rio Ave. In the 2022–23 season, Gouveia made 30 appearances in all competitions for the Canaries, scoring five goals and providing six assists.

After impressing on loan, Gouveia returned to Benfica and, on 3 July 2023, signed a new five-year contract with the club. At the end of the 2023–24 pre-season, Benfica manager Roger Schmidt selected him to be part of the Eagles squad for the 2023–24 campaign. On 20 September 2023, Gouveia made his UEFA Champions League debut, coming off the bench to replace Rafa Silva in the 83rd minute of a 2–0 group stage loss at home to Red Bull Salzburg. A month later, he scored his first goal for Benfica's main team, in a 4–1 victory away at Campeonato de Portugal (Portuguese 4th tier) side Lusitânia, in the third round of the Taça de Portugal.

== Career statistics ==
=== Club ===
As of match played 26 May 2026

Appearances and goals by club, season and competition
Club	Season	League			National cup		League cup		Continental		Other		Total	
Club	Season	Division	Apps	Goals	Apps	Goals	Apps	Goals	Apps	Goals	Apps	Goals	Apps	Goals
Benfica B	2019–20	LigaPro	1	0	—		—		—		—		1	0
Benfica B	2020–21	Liga Portugal 2	21	2	—		—		—		—		21	2
Benfica B	2021–22	Liga Portugal 2	25	10	—		—		—		—		25	10
Benfica B	2023–24	Liga Portugal 2	1	0	—		—		—		—		1	0
Benfica B	2024–25	Liga Portugal 2	2	0	—		—		—		—		2	0
Benfica B	Total		50	12	—		—		—		—		50	12
Benfica	2021–22	Primeira Liga	2	0	0	0	0	0	0	0	—		2	0
Benfica	2023–24	Primeira Liga	13	2	5	1	3	1	0	—		26	4	
Benfica	2024–25	Primeira Liga	4	1	2	0	0	0	0	0	—		6	1
Benfica	Total		19	3	7	1	3	1	5	0	—		34	5
Estoril (loan)	2022–23	Primeira Liga	29	5	1	0	0	0	—		—		30	5
Nice (loan)	2025–26	Ligue 1	15	0	2	0	—		7 (Note: Appearances in UEFA Europa League)	2	1 (Note: Appearance in Ligue 1 relegation/promotion play-offs)	0	25	2
Career total			113	20	10	1	5	1	10	2	1	0	139	24

== Honours ==
Benfica

- Supertaça Cândido de Oliveira: 2023, 2025

Nice

- Coupe de France runner-up: 2025–26
