= 2024–25 SK Beveren season =

S.K. Beveren
2024–25 season
- Manager: Marink Reedijk
- Stadium: Freethiel Stadion
- Challenger Pro League: 4th
- Promotion/relegation play-offs: Quarter-finals
- Belgian Cup: Seventh round
- Top goalscorer: League: Lennart Mertens (14); All: Lennart Mertens (14)

The 2024–25 season was the 89th season in the history of S.K. Beveren and the club's fourth consecutive campaign in the Challenger Pro League, the second tier of Belgian football. In addition to the league, Beveren entered the Belgian Cup. The team finished fourth in the Challenger Pro League and qualified for the promotion play-offs, where they were eliminated in the quarter-finals by Patro Eisden 5–3 on aggregate. In the Belgian Cup, Beveren reached the seventh round before being knocked out by Genk. The season was the first under head coach Marink Reedijk, who had been appointed prior to the start of the campaign.

== Friendlies ==
=== Pre-season ===
28 June 2024 Friendly	Beveren (Belgium)	0-6	(Belgium) Zulte Waregem	Beveren
19:00		Report	Siebe Van Keymolen 7'; Vossen 35'; Erenbjerg 37'; Nnadi 56'; Ndour 71' 88'	Stadium: Freethiel Stadion

== Competitions ==
=== Overall record ===
Competition	First match	Last match	Starting round	Final position	Record							
Competition	First match	Last match	Starting round	Final position	Pld	W	D	L	GF	GA	GD	Win %
Challenger Pro League	17 August 2024	18 April 2025	Matchday 1	4th	28	14	9	5	41	27	+14	50.00
Belgian Cup	7 September 2024	30 October 2024	Sixth round	Round of 32	2	1	0	1	3	4	−1	50.00
Total					30	15	9	6	44	31	+13	50.00

Source: Competitions

=== Challenger Pro League ===
==== League table ====
Pos	Team	Pld	W	D	L	GF	GA	GD	Pts	Qualification
2	La Louvière (P)	28	17	8	3	50	24	+26	59	Promoted to Pro League
3	RWD Molenbeek	28	17	6	5	42	21	+21	57	Qualification for promotion play-offs
4	Beveren	28	14	9	5	41	27	+14	51	Qualification for promotion play-offs
5	Patro Eisden Maasmechelen	28	13	10	5	51	28	+23	49	Qualification for promotion play-offs
6	Club NXT	28	14	5	9	46	35	+11	47	Ineligible for promotion, promotion play-offs and (from matchday 24 on) also relegation

Source: Challenger Pro League
Rules for classification: 1) Points; 2) Matches won; 3) Goal difference; 4) Goals scored; 5) Away matches won; 6) Away goal difference; 7) Away goals made.
(P) Promoted

==== Results summary ====
Overall								Home						Away					
Pld	W	D	L	GF	GA	GD	Pts	W	D	L	GF	GA	GD	W	D	L	GF	GA	GD
0	0	0	0	0	0	0	0	0	0	0	0	0	0	0	0	0	0	0	0

Last updated: August 2024.
Source: Worldfootball

==== Results by round ====
Round	1
Ground	
Result	
Position	

Updated to match(es) played on August 2024. Source: Worldfootball
A = Away; H = Home; W = Win; D = Draw; L = Loss

==== Matches ====
The match schedule was released on 11 June 2024.

17 August 2024 1	Beveren	2–1	Lommel

23 August 2024 2	Eupen	2–2	Beveren

31 August 2024 3	RFC Liège	0–0	Beveren

15 September 2024 4	Beveren	3–2	Jong Genk

20 September 2024 5	Beveren	0–0	RFC Seraing

28 September 2024 6	Club NXT	2–0	Beveren

5 October 2024 7	Beveren	0–1	Lokeren-Temse

18 October 2024 8	La Louvière	2–0	Beveren

26 October 2024 9	Beveren	1–1	RSCA Futures

3 November 2024 10	Deinze	3–1; Voided	Beveren

9 November 2024 11	Beveren	4–0	Royal Francs Borains

23 November 2024 12	RWD Molenbeek	0–2	Beveren

30 November 2024 13	Beveren	0–0	Patro Eisden Maasmechelen

7 December 2024 14	Zulte Waregem	4–0	Beveren

13 December 2024 15	Beveren	1–0	Lierse

22 December 2024 16	Lokeren-Temse	0–1	Beveren

12 January 2025 17	Beveren	0–0	La Louvière

18 January 2025 18	Royal Francs Borains	0–0	Beveren

19	Bye

2 February 2025 20	Jong Genk	3–3	Beveren

9 February 2025 21	RFC Seraing	0–2	Beveren

15 February 2025 22	Beveren	3–1	RFC Liège

22 February 2025 23	Lommel	1–2	Beveren

28 February 2025 24	Beveren	3–2	Zulte Waregem

9 March 2025 25	Patro Eisden Maasmechelen	1–2	Beveren

14 March 2025 26	Beveren	0–2	RWD Molenbeek

29 March 2025 27	Lierse	0–1	Beveren

4 April 2025 28	Beveren	3–0	Eupen

13 April 2025 29	Beveren	2–2	Club NXT

18 April 2025 30	RSCA Futures	0–4	Beveren

=== Belgian Cup ===
7 September 2024 Sixth round	Dessel	2–3 (a.e.t.)	Beveren
19:30

30 October 2024 Round of 32	Beveren	0–2	Genk
20:15
