= Carlinhos =

Carlinhos is a Portuguese nickname that is a diminutive form of Carlos. Notable people referred to by this name include the following:

== Nickname ==
- Carlinhos Pandeiro de Ouro (born 1940), born Carlos de Oliveira, Brazilian percussionist
- Carlinhos Brown (born 1962), born Antonio Carlos Santos de Freitas, Brazilian singer
- Carlos Gracie Jr., nicknamed "Carlinhos", (born 1956) Brazilian jiu-jitsu practitioner and instructor

=== Football ===
- Carlinhos (footballer, born 1937) (1937–2015), born Luís Carlos Nunes da Silva, Brazilian defensive midfielder
- Carlinhos (footballer, born 1956), born Carlos Eduardo Ribeiro, Brazilian leftback
- Carlinhos Maracanã (footballer), born Carlos Jorge Ferreira (1957–2023), Brazilian midfielder
- Carlinhos (footballer, born 1974), born Carlos Augusto Rodrigues, Brazilian centre-back
- Carlinhos Bala (born 1979), born José Carlos da Silva Brazilian striker
- Carlinhos (footballer, born 1980), born Carlos Alberto de Almeida Jr., Brazilian midfielder
- Carlinhos (footballer, born 1981), born Carlos Roberto da Silva Santos, Brazilian striker
- Carlinhos (footballer, born 1983), born Carlos Henrique Carneiro Marinho, Brazilian rightback
- Carlinhos Paraíba (born 1983), born Carlos Pereira Berto Júnior, Brazilian midfielder
- Carlinhos (footballer, born 1984), born Carlos César Matheus, Brazilian defensive midfielder
- Carlinhos (footballer, born January 1986), born Carlos Henrique de Oliveira, Brazilian centre-back
- Carlinhos (footballer, born November 1986), born Carlos Emiliano Pereira Brazilian leftback
- Carlos Leonel (born 1987), sometimes referred to as Carlinhos, Portuguese forward
- Carlinhos (footballer, born 1987), born Carlos Andrade Souza, Brazilian leftback
- Carlinhos (footballer, born 1990), born Carlos Alberto Rogger Dias, Brazilian wingback
- Carlinhos (footballer, born June 1994), born Carlos Vinícius Santos de Jesus, Brazilian midfielder
- Carlinhos (footballer, born August 1994), born Carlos Antonio de Souza Júnior, Brazilian forward
- Carlinhos (footballer, born March 1995), born Carlos Sténio Fernandes Guimarães do Carmo, Angolan midfielder
- Carlinhos (footballer, born June 1995), born Carlos Adalberto de Oliveira Junior, Brazilian defender
- Carlinhos (footballer, born 1997), born Carlos Moisés de Lima, Brazilian forward

== See also ==
- Carlinos
