= Carlinhos (footballer, born 1981) =

Brazilian footballer

Personal information
- Full name: Carlos Roberto da Silva Santos
- Date of birth: April 2, 1981 (age 45)
- Place of birth: Rio de Janeiro, Brazil
- Height: 1.70 m (5 ft 7 in)
- Position: Striker

Youth career
- Botafogo

Senior career*
Years	Team	Apps	(Gls)
1997–1998	Botafogo		
1999–2000	Bangu		
2001	Rádio		
2002	Velo Clube		
2003–2004	Renovo		
2003	→ Campo Grande (loan)		
2005	Lobos		
2006–2007	Pão de Açúcar-SP		
2007	→ Sorkhpooshan (loan)		
2008	Rio Preto		
2009	Shahin Bushehr		
2010	ABC		
2010–2011	Hamyari	21	(2)
2011–2013	Jacareí		
2014–2017	CRAC		
- * Club domestic league appearances and goals as of 7 March 2017 (UTC)

Carlos Roberto da Silva Santos (born April 2, 1981), known as Carlinhos, is a Brazilian footballer who plays as a striker for Hamyari Arak F.C. in the Azadegan League of Iran.

== Career ==
Santos came to Iran in 2006, after being loaned to Sorkhpooshan. In 2010, he joined Hamyari.

== Career statistics ==
Club performance			League		Cup		Continental		Total	
Season	Club	League	Apps	Goals	Apps	Goals	Apps	Goals	Apps	Goals
Iran			League		Hazfi Cup		Asia		Total	
2010–11	Hamyari	Azadegan League	21	2	0	0	-	-	21	2
Total	Iran		21	2	0	0	0	0	21	2
Career total			21	2	0	0	0	0	21	2

== External sources ==
- Profile at Persianleague
- Carlinhos at Sambafoot (archived)
