= Pedro Álvaro =

Portuguese footballer

Personal information
- Full name: Pedro Miguel da Costa Álvaro
- Date of birth: 2 March 2000 (age 26)
- Place of birth: Sandomil, Portugal
- Height: 1.87 m (6 ft 2 in)
- Position: Centre back

Team information
- Current team: Shandong Taishan
- Number: 23

Youth career
- 2009–2010: Seia FC
- 2010–2011: AD São Romão
- 2011–2020: Benfica

Senior career*
| Years | Team | Apps | (Gls) |
| 2017–2022 | Benfica B | 52 | (2) |
| 2020–2021 | → Belenenses SAD (loan) | 0 | (0) |
| 2022–2025 | Estoril | 81 | (2) |
| 2025–2026 | Aris | 15 | (1) |
| 2026– | Shandong Taishan | 22 | (0) |

International career^{‡}
| 2015 | Portugal U15 | 1 | (0) |
| 2015–2016 | Portugal U16 | 11 | (1) |
| 2016–2017 | Portugal U17 | 6 | (0) |
| 2018 | Portugal U18 | 7 | (2) |
| 2018–2019 | Portugal U19 | 12 | (0) |
| 2019 | Portugal U20 | 4 | (0) |
- * Club domestic league appearances and goals as of 8 November 2026 ‡ National team caps and goals as of 17 October 2019

Pedro Miguel da Costa Álvaro (born 2 March 2000) is a Portuguese professional footballer. He plays as a centre-back for Chinese Super League club Shandong Taishan.

== Career ==
Born in Sandomil, Seia, Guarda District, Álvaro started playing football at local club Seia FC at 9 years old . After being scouted and moving to Benfica's youth system in 2011, he made his professional debut with Benfica B in a goalless away draw to Leixões in LigaPro on 26 November 2017.

On 23 June 2025, Pedro moved abroad for the first time in his career, signing a four-year contract with Aris.

On 12 February of 2026, an official announcement from Aris FC stated that the club and Pedro Miguel Da Costa Alvaro had mutually terminated their cooperation. During his time in Thessaloniki Alvaro made 15 appearances in the Super League 1, scoring one goal.

On 15 February 2026, Pedro joined Chinese Super League club Shandong Taishan.

== Career statistics ==
As of match played 8 November 2026

Appearances and goals by club, season and competition
| Club | Season | League | | | National Cup | | League Cup | | Continental | | Other | | Total | |
| Club | Season | Division | Apps | Goals | Apps | Goals | Apps | Goals | Apps | Goals | Apps | Goals | Apps | Goals |
|---|---|---|---|---|---|---|---|---|---|---|---|---|---|---|
| Estoril | 2022–23 | Primeira Liga | 30 | 1 | 1 | 0 | 4 | 0 | — | | — | | 35 | 1 |
| Estoril | 2023–24 | Primeira Liga | 20 | 0 | 3 | 0 | 5 | 0 | — | | — | | 28 | 0 |
| Estoril | 2024–25 | Primeira Liga | 31 | 1 | 1 | 0 | 0 | 0 | — | | — | | 32 | 1 |
| Estoril | Total | | 81 | 2 | 5 | 0 | 9 | 0 | — | | — | | 95 | 2 |
| Estoril | 2025–26 | Super League Greece | 15 | 1 | 2 | 0 | — | | 1 | 0 | — | | 18 | 1 |
| Shandong Taishan | 2026 | Chinese Super League | 22 | 0 | 1 | 0 | — | | — | | — | | 23 | 0 |
| Career total | | | 118 | 3 | 8 | 0 | 9 | 0 | 1 | 0 | 0 | 0 | 136 | 3 |

== Honours ==
Benfica

- UEFA Youth League runner-up: 2016–17
