= João Amorim (footballer, born July 1992) =

Portuguese footballer (born 1992)

Personal information
- Full name: João Filipe Amorim Gomes
- Date of birth: 26 July 1992 (age 34)
- Place of birth: Ribeirão, Portugal
- Height: 1.78 m (5 ft 10 in)
- Position: Right-back

Youth career
- 2002–2005: Ribeirão
- 2005–2011: Vitória Guimarães

Senior career*
Years	Team	Apps	(Gls)
2011–2015	Vitória Guimarães	11	(0)
2011–2012	→ Freamunde (loan)	15	(0)
2012–2015	Vitória Guimarães B	22	(0)
2015	Académico Viseu	22	(2)
2015–2016	Belenenses	8	(0)
2016–2017	Aves	18	(1)
2017–2019	Arouca	36	(0)
2019–2020	Varzim	24	(0)
2020–2021	Cova Piedade	19	(0)
2021–2025	Leixões	75	(1)
Total		250	(4)

International career
2008–2009	Portugal U17	16	(0)
2009–2010	Portugal U18	7	(0)
2009–2011	Portugal U19	22	(0)
2010–2012	Portugal U20	5	(0)
2012–2013	Portugal U21	7	(0)
- * Club domestic league appearances and goals

João Filipe Amorim Gomes (born 26 July 1992), known as Amorim, is a Portuguese former professional footballer who played as a right-back.

He played 19 games in the Primeira Liga for Vitória S.C. and Belenenses but spent most of his career in second division, making over 200 appearances in service of eight teams.

== Club career ==
Born in Ribeirão, Vila Nova de Famalicão, Amorim began his development at hometown club G.D. Ribeirão and concluded it at Vitória SC. In 2011, he was loaned to S.C. Freamunde of the Segunda Liga, where he made his professional debut.

Amorim made his first appearance in the Primeira Liga for Vitória on 28 April 2012 aged 19, playing the full 90 minutes in a 3–1 away loss against Gil Vicente FC; his defensive performance was considered subpar by website Mais Futebol.

In January 2015, Amorim cancelled his contract and signed with second tier side Académico de Viseu F.C. until the end of the season. He returned to the top flight on 10 June, on a deal of undisclosed length at C.F. Os Belenenses.

Amorim dropped back down a level in June 2016, joining C.D. Aves. He played just under half of their games as they won promotion as runners-up to Portimonense SC, and scored on the final day in a 3–0 home win over AD Fafe.

Amorim continued competing in division two the following years, representing F.C. Arouca, Varzim SC, C.D. Cova da Piedade and Leixões SC. On 7 July 2025, the 33-year-old announced his retirement.
