= Mor Ndiaye =

Senegalese footballer

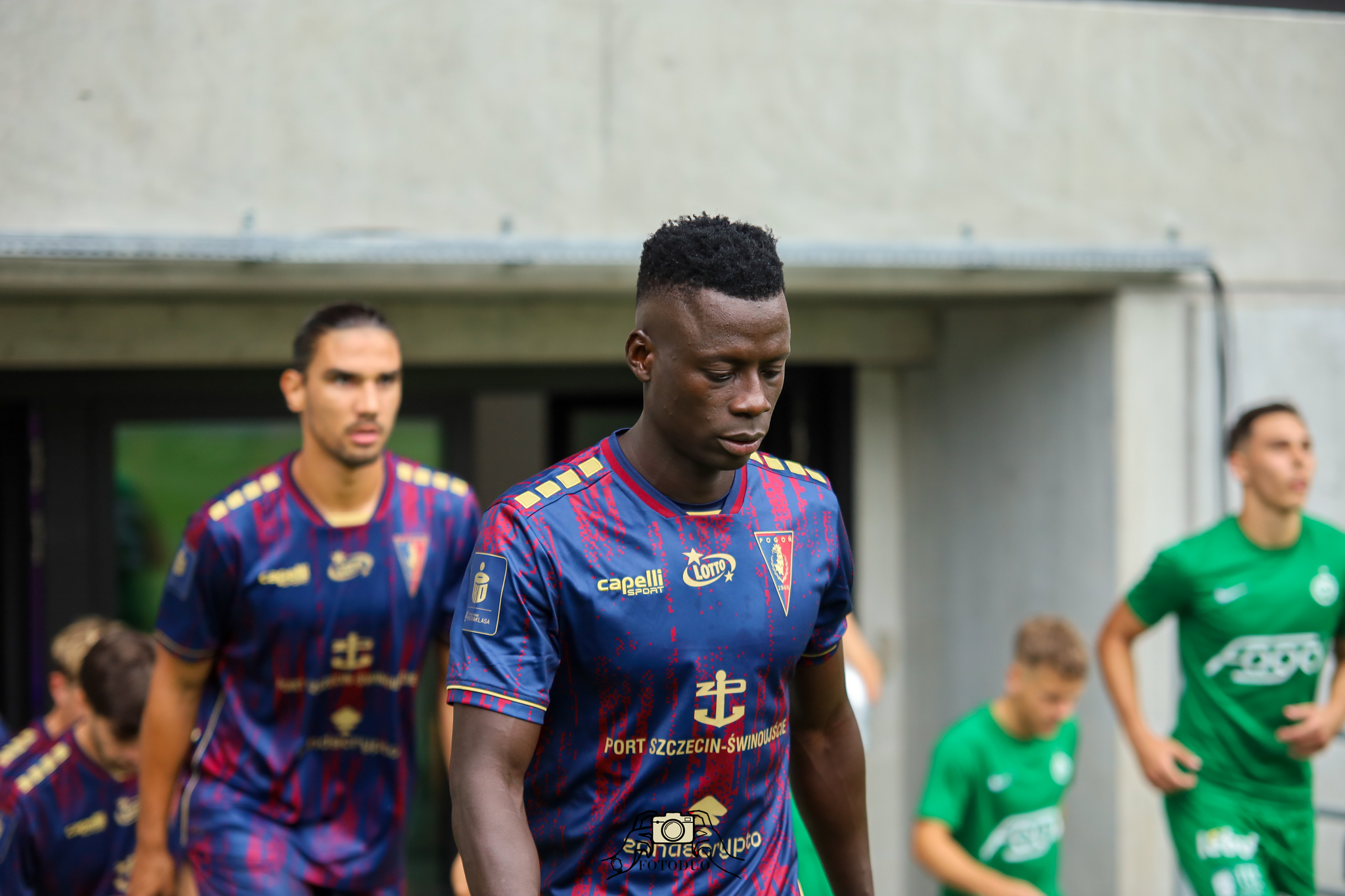
- Ndiaye with Pogoń Szczecin in 2025

Personal information
- Date of birth: 22 November 2000 (age 25)
- Place of birth: Thiès, Senegal
- Height: 1.85 m (6 ft 1 in)
- Position: Defensive midfielder

Team information
- Current team: Pogoń Szczecin
- Number: 19

Youth career
- –2018: Africa Promo Foot
- 2018–2019: Porto

Senior career*
Years	Team	Apps	(Gls)
2019–2022	Porto B	82	(8)
2022–2024	Estoril	34	(0)
2024–2025	Athens Kallithea	23	(1)
2025–	Pogoń Szczecin	17	(1)
2025–	Pogoń Szczecin II	4	(0)
- * Club domestic league appearances and goals as of 09:48, 30 May 2026 (UTC)

Mor Ndiaye (born 22 November 2000) is a Senegalese professional footballer who plays as a defensive midfielder for Ekstraklasa club Pogoń Szczecin.

== Career statistics ==
As of match played 25 April 2026

Appearances and goals by club, season and competition
Club	Season	League			National cup (Note: Includes Taça de Portugal, Greek Cup, Polish Cup)		League cup (Note: Includes Taça da Liga)		Total	
Club	Season	Division	Apps	Goals	Apps	Goals	Apps	Goals	Apps	Goals
Porto B	2019–20	Segunda Liga	22	1	—		—		22	1
Porto B	2020–21	Segunda Liga	28	4	—		—		28	4
Porto B	2021–22	Segunda Liga	32	3	—		—		32	3
Porto B	Total		82	8	—		—		82	8
Estoril	2022–23	Primeira Liga	26	0	2	0	4	0	32	0
Estoril	2023–24	Primeira Liga	8	0	0	0	2	0	10	0
Estoril	Total		34	0	2	0	6	0	42	0
Athens Kallithea	2024–25	Super League Greece	23	1	3	0	—		26	1
Pogoń Szczecin	2025–26	Ekstraklasa	17	1	2	0	—		19	1
Pogoń Szczecin II	2025–26	III liga, group II	4	0	—		—		4	0
Career total			160	10	7	0	6	0	173	10

== Honours ==
Porto Youth

- UEFA Youth League: 2018–19
