= Bernardo Vital =

Portuguese footballer

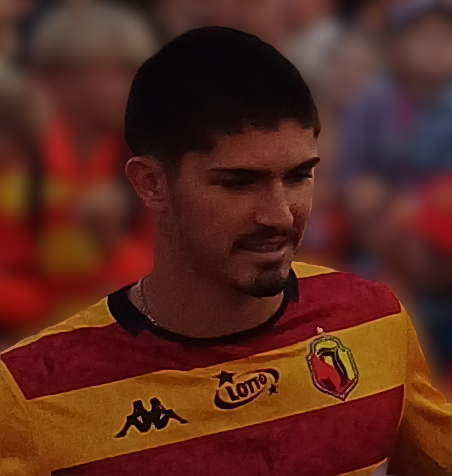
- Vital with Jagiellonia Białystok in 2025

Personal information
- Full name: Bernardo Maria Morais Cardoso Vital
- Date of birth: 29 December 2000 (age 25)
- Place of birth: Lisbon, Portugal
- Height: 1.87 m (6 ft 2 in)
- Position: Centre-back

Team information
- Current team: Jagiellonia Białystok
- Number: 5

Youth career
- 2009–2011: Futebol Benfica
- 2012–2015: AFD Torre
- 2015–2019: Estoril

Senior career*
Years	Team	Apps	(Gls)
2019–2024	Estoril	77	(2)
2024–2025	Zaragoza	33	(0)
2025–	Jagiellonia Białystok	37	(4)

International career
2022–2023	Portugal U21	3	(0)
- * Club domestic league appearances and goals as of 01:46, 1 November 2026 (UTC)

Bernardo Maria Morais Cardoso Vital (born 29 December 2000) is a Portuguese professional footballer who plays as a centre-back for Ekstraklasa club Jagiellonia Białystok.

== Club career ==
=== Estoril ===
Born in Lisbon, Vital joined G.D. Estoril Praia's academy at the age of 14. He made his senior debut with the club in the Liga Portugal 2 on 20 September 2020, coming on as a late substitute for André Vidigal in a 1–0 away loss against Académica de Coimbra. He added three more appearances until the end of the season, in an eventual promotion as champions.

Vital played his first match in the Primeira Liga on 7 August 2021, starting and finishing the 2–0 win at F.C. Arouca. In December, as his contract was due to expire, he renewed it until 2025.

Vital scored his first goal in the Portuguese top division on 27 February 2022, opening an eventual 2–3 home defeat to Boavista FC. He added two more until the end of his stint, in 94 competitive appearances.

=== Zaragoza ===
On 13 August 2024, Vital moved abroad and signed a two-year contract with Spanish Segunda División side Real Zaragoza. Having arrived as a free agent, he totalled 35 games during his spell in Aragon.

=== Jagiellonia Białystok ===
On 3 July 2025, Vital joined Jagiellonia Białystok in the Polish Ekstraklasa; he agreed to a two-year deal with an option for another two years.

== International career ==
On 24 September 2022, Vital won his first cap for Portugal at under-21 level, playing the second half of the 4–1 friendly win over Georgia.

== Career statistics ==
As of match played 20 September 2026

Appearances and goals by club, season and competition
Club	Season	League			National cup (Note: Includes Taça de Portugal, Copa del Rey, Polish Cup)		League cup (Note: Includes Taça da Liga)		Continental		Total	
Club	Season	Division	Apps	Goals	Apps	Goals	Apps	Goals	Apps	Goals	Apps	Goals
Estoril	2020–21	Liga Portugal 2	4	0	2	0	0	0	—		6	0
Estoril	2021–22	Primeira Liga	17	1	0	0	2	0	—		19	1
Estoril	2022–23	Primeira Liga	26	0	2	0	2	0	—		30	0
Estoril	2023–24	Primeira Liga	29	1	3	1	6	0	—		38	2
Estoril	2024–25	Primeira Liga	1	0	0	0	—		—		1	0
Estoril	Total		77	2	7	1	10	0	—		94	3
Zaragoza	2024–25	Segunda División	33	0	2	0	—		—		35	0
Jagiellonia Białystok	2025–26	Ekstraklasa	27	3	2	0	—		14 (Note: Appearances in UEFA Conference League)	1	43	4
Jagiellonia Białystok	2026–27	Ekstraklasa	7	0	0	0	—		4 (Note: Appearances in UEFA Europa League)	0	11	0
Jagiellonia Białystok	Total		34	3	2	0	—		18	1	54	4
Career total			144	5	11	1	10	0	18	1	183	7

== Honours ==
Estoril

- Liga Portugal 2: 2020–21
