= Tiago Araújo =

Portuguese footballer

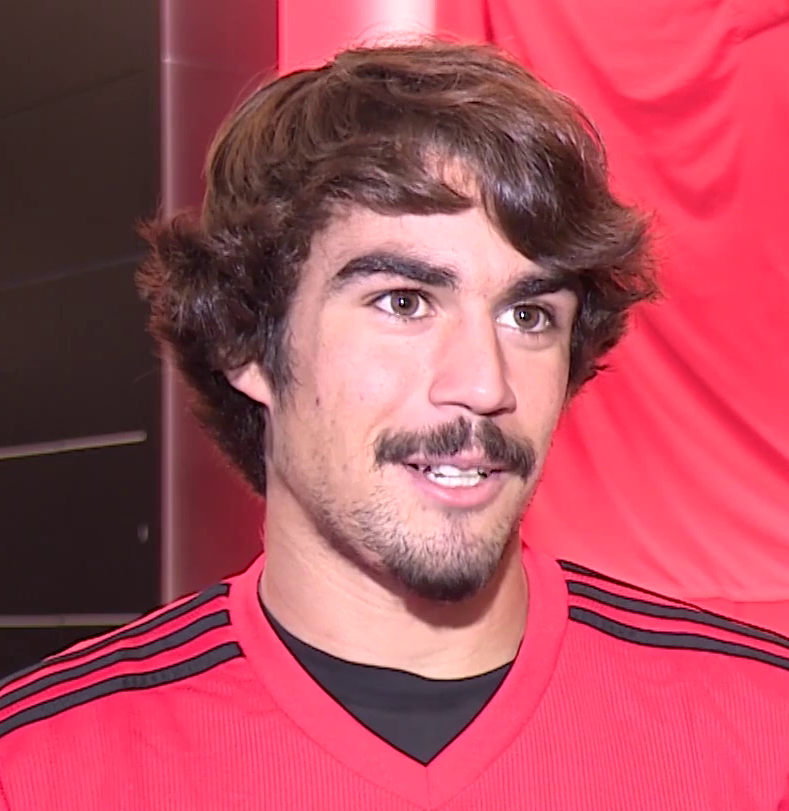
- Araújo in 2020

Personal information
- Full name: Tiago Filipe Alves Araújo
- Date of birth: 27 March 2001 (age 25)
- Place of birth: Póvoa de Varzim, Portugal
- Height: 1.83 m (6 ft 0 in)
- Position: Left back

Team information
- Current team: Gent
- Number: 20

Youth career
- 2010–2013: Póvoa Lanhoso
- 2013–2020: Benfica
- 2015–2016: → Vitória Guimarães (loan)

Senior career*
Years	Team	Apps	(Gls)
2020–2022	Benfica B	25	(2)
2020–2022	Benfica	0	(0)
2021–2022	→ Arouca (loan)	15	(0)
2022–2024	Estoril	54	(3)
2024–	Gent	69	(3)

International career
2017	Portugal U16	5	(0)
2017	Portugal U17	3	(0)
2019	Portugal U18	6	(0)
2019	Portugal U20	2	(0)
2021–2022	Portugal U21	2	(0)
- * Club domestic league appearances and goals as of 25 October 2026

Tiago Filipe Alves Araújo (born 27 March 2001) is a Portuguese professional footballer who plays as a full back for Belgian Pro League club Gent.

== Playing career ==
On 4 April 2019, Araújo signed a contract with S.L. Benfica. He made his professional debut with Benfica B in a 3–2 LigaPro win over U.D. Vilafranquense on 13 September 2020. On 21 November 2020, he made his first team debut in a 1–0 cup win over Paredes.

On 24 August 2024, Araújo signed a four-season contract with Gent in Belgium.

== Career statistics ==
As of match played 25 October 2026

Club statistics
Club	Season	League			National Cup		League Cup		Europe		Total	
Club	Season	Division	Apps	Goals	Apps	Goals	Apps	Goals	Apps	Goals	Apps	Goals
Benfica B	2020–21	Liga Portugal 2	23	2	—		—		—		23	2
Benfica B	2021–22	Liga Portugal 2	2	0	—		—		—		2	0
Benfica B	Total		25	2	0	0	0	0	—		25	2
Benfica	2020–21	Primeira Liga	0	0	1	0	—		0	0	1	0
Benfica	2021–22	Primeira Liga	0	0	0	0	—		0	0	0	0
Benfica	Total		0	0	0	0	0	0	0	0	0	0
Arouca (loan)	2021–22	Primeira Liga	15	0	1	0	—		—		16	0
Estoril Praia	2022–23	Primeira Liga	25	1	2	0	3	0	—		30	1
Estoril Praia	2023–24	Primeira Liga	29	2	3	0	6	0	—		38	2
Estoril Praia	2024–25	Primeira Liga	0	0	0	0	0	0	—		0	0
Estoril Praia	Total		54	3	5	0	9	0	—		68	3
Gent	2024–25	Belgian Pro League	26	0	2	0	—		8 (Note: Appearances in UEFA Conference League)	0	36	0
Gent	2025–26	Belgian Pro League	34	1	2	0	—		—		36	1
Gent	2026–27	Belgian Pro League	9	2	0	0	—		8	0	17	2
Gent	Total		69	3	4	0	—		16	0	89	3
Career totals			163	8	11	0	9	0	16	0	199	8
