= Luís Esteves (footballer) =

Portuguese footballer

Personal information
- Full name: Luís André Leite Esteves
- Date of birth: 9 April 1998 (age 28)
- Place of birth: Ovar, Portugal
- Height: 1.69 m (5 ft 7 in)
- Position: Midfielder

Team information
- Current team: Atlas
- Number: 10

Youth career
- 2006–2007: Arada
- 2007–2015: Sporting CP
- 2015–2016: Feirense
- 2016–2017: Braga

Senior career*
Years	Team	Apps	(Gls)
2017–2018	Sanjoanense	25	(1)
2018–2022	Vitória Guimarães B	62	(20)
2022	Vitória Guimarães	3	(0)
2022–2025	Nacional	96	(5)
2025–2026	Gil Vicente	33	(4)
2026–	Atlas	13	(5)
- * Club domestic league appearances and goals as of 21 October 2026

Luís André Leite Esteves (born 9 April 1998) is a Portuguese professional footballer who plays as a midfielder for Liga MX club Atlas.

== Professional career ==
Esteves is a youth product of Arada, Sporting CP, Feirense and Braga. He began his career with the semi-pro side Sanjoanense in 2017, before signing with the reserves of Vitória Guimarães. He signed a professional contract with Vitória Guimarães on 23 December 2020. He made his professional debut with Vitória Guimarães in a 3-2 Primeira Liga loss to Gil Vicente on 22 January 2022, coming on as a late sub in the 86th minute.

On 4 July 2022, Esteves signed a three-year contract with Liga Portugal 2 club Nacional.

== Honours ==
Individual

- Liga Portugal 2 Midfielder of the Month: December 2023
