= Alejandro Marqués =

Association football player (born 2000)

Personal information
- Full name: Alejandro José Marqués Méndez
- Date of birth: 4 August 2000 (age 26)
- Place of birth: Caracas, Venezuela
- Height: 1.89 m (6 ft 2 in)
- Position: Forward

Team information
- Current team: Granada
- Number: 9

Youth career
- 2013–2014: Espanyol
- 2014–2017: Jàbac Terrassa
- 2017–2019: Barcelona

Senior career*
Years	Team	Apps	(Gls)
2018–2020	Barcelona B	22	(1)
2020–2023	Juventus	0	(0)
2020–2021	Juventus U23	26	(7)
2021–2022	→ Mirandés (loan)	29	(7)
2022–2023	→ Estoril (loan)	15	(3)
2023–2026	Estoril	90	(24)
2026–	Granada	0	(0)

International career^{‡}
2019	Spain U19	9	(3)
2023–	Venezuela	5	(0)
Medal record
Men's football
Representing Venezuela
FIFA Series
Runner-up	2026 Uzbekistan
Representing Spain
UEFA European Under-19 Championship
Winner	2019 Armenia
- * Club domestic league appearances and goals as of 30 May 2026 ‡ National team caps and goals as of 19:13, 39 May 2026 (UTC)

Alejandro José Marqués Méndez (born 4 August 2000) is a professional footballer who plays as a forward for Segunda División club Granada and the Venezuela national team.

Born in Venezuela, he represented Spain at youth level since 2019, and was part of the team that won the 2019 UEFA European Under-19 Championship. He moved to Spain at an early age and holds dual-citizenship.

== Club career ==
=== Youth ===
Born in Caracas, Marqués moved to Spain aged 13 and joined RCD Espanyol's youth setup in 2013. He subsequently moved to UFB Jàbac Terrassa in the following year, before joining FC Barcelona's Juvenil squad on 14 June 2017.

=== Barcelona ===
Marqués made his senior debut with the reserves on 17 March 2018, coming on as a second-half substitute for Marcus McGuane in a 1–1 away draw against Lorca FC in the Segunda División championship. His side suffered relegation at the end of the season, and he remained a backup option in the following years.

=== Juventus ===
On 24 January 2020, Barcelona B sold Marqués to Juventus for €8.2 million, in exchange for Matheus Pereira on loan. He made his first appearance for Juventus U23 on 16 February, in a 2–1 Serie C away win over Monza. Marqués' first goal came on 13 July, in a 2–2 draw against Carrarese in the quarter-finals of the Serie C promotion play-offs.

==== Loan to Mirandés ====
On 27 August 2021, Marqués returned to Spain after agreeing to a one-year loan deal with Mirandés in the second division. Despite being mainly a backup option to Sergio Camello, he still finished the season with ten goals.

=== Estoril ===
On 28 July 2022, Marqués was loaned to Primeira Liga side Estoril. On 27 July 2023, Estoril announced the permanent signing of Marqués on a three-year deal.

=== Granada ===
On 24 July 2026, free agent Marqués returned to Spain and its second division, after signing for Granada CF.

== International career ==
While eligible to represent his native Venezuela, Marques was called-up to the Spain national under-19 team. He represented them at the 2019 UEFA European Under-19 Championship, scoring three goals in nine appearances, and helping his side win the title. On 25 May 2022, he was first called up by Venezuela.

== Career statistics ==
=== Club ===
As of match played 22 March 2026

Appearances and goals by club, season and competition
Club	Season	League			National cup (Note: Includes Copa del Rey, Taça de Portugal)		League cup (Note: Includes Taça da Liga)		Other		Total	
Club	Season	Division	Apps	Goals	Apps	Goals	Apps	Goals	Apps	Goals	Apps	Goals
Barcelona B	2017–18	Segunda División	5	0	—		—		—		5	0
Barcelona B	2018–19	Segunda División B	6	1	—		—		—		6	1
Barcelona B	2019–20	Segunda División B	11	0	—		—		—		11	0
Barcelona B	Total		22	1	0	0	0	0	0	0	22	1
Juventus U23	2019–20	Serie C	1	0	—		—		3 (Note: One appearance in Coppa Italia Serie C, two appearances and one goal in Serie C promotion play-offs)	1	4	1
Juventus U23	2020–21	Serie C	25	7	—		—		1 (Note: Appearance in Serie C promotion play-offs)	0	26	7
Juventus U23	Total		26	7	0	0	0	0	4	1	30	8
Mirandés (loan)	2021–22	Segunda División	29	7	3	3	—		—		32	10
Mirandés (loan)	Total		29	7	3	3	0	0	0	0	32	10
Estoril (loan)	2022–23	Primeira Liga	15	3	0	0	4	2	—		19	5
Estoril	2023–24	Primeira Liga	31	9	3	1	3	0	0	0	37	10
Estoril	2024–25	Primeira Liga	33	11	1	0	—		0	0	34	11
Estoril	2025–26	Primeira Liga	21	4	1	1	—		—		22	4
Estoril	Total		100	27	5	2	7	2	0	0	112	31
Career total			177	42	8	5	7	2	4	1	196	50

=== International ===
As of match played 27 March 2026

Appearances and goals by national team and year
National team	Year	Apps	Goals
Venezuela	2023	3	0
Venezuela	2025	1	0
Venezuela	2026	1	0
Total		5	0

== Honours ==
Barcelona

- UEFA Youth League: 2017–18

Juventus U23

- Coppa Italia Serie C: 2019–20

Spain U19

- UEFA European Under-19 Championship: 2019

Venezuela

- FIFA Series runner-up: 2026
