= Heriberto Tavares =

Cape Verdean footballer (born 1997)

Heri Tavares
Personal information
- Full name: Heriberto Moreno Borges Tavares
- Date of birth: 16 February 1997 (age 29)
- Place of birth: Amadora, Portugal
- Height: 1.81 m (5 ft 11 in)
- Positions: Winger; forward

Team information
- Current team: Universitatea Craiova
- Number: 19

Youth career
- 2006–2007: Estrela Amadora
- 2007–2015: Sporting CP
- 2015–2016: Belenenses

Senior career*
Years	Team	Apps	(Gls)
2016–2020	Benfica B	78	(25)
2018–2019	→ Moreirense (loan)	32	(6)
2019–2020	→ Boavista (loan)	28	(4)
2020–2021	Brest	4	(0)
2021	→ Famalicão (loan)	17	(2)
2021–2023	Famalicão	20	(1)
2022–2023	→ Ponferradina (loan)	19	(0)
2023–2024	Estoril	32	(2)
2024–2026	Maccabi Netanya	60	(8)
2026–	Universitatea Craiova	7	(0)

International career^{‡}
2012	Portugal U15	2	(0)
2012–2013	Portugal U16	4	(0)
2016–2017	Portugal U20	5	(1)
2017–2018	Portugal U21	9	(6)
2025–	Cape Verde	6	(1)
- * Club domestic league appearances and goals as of 1 November 2026 ‡ National team caps and goals as of 18 November 2025

Heriberto Moreno Borges Tavares (Portuguese: [e.ɾi.ˈbɛɾ.tu mu.ˈɾe.nu ˈbɔɾ.ʒɨʃ ta.ˈva.ɾɨʃ]; born 19 February 1997), also known as Heri Tavares, is a professional footballer who plays as a winger or forward for Liga I club Universitatea Craiova. Born in Portugal, he plays for the Cape Verde national team.

== Club career ==
=== Benfica ===
Born in Amadora, Lisbon metropolitan area of Cape Verdean descent, Tavares played youth football with three clubs in the country's capital, including Sporting CP from ages 10 to 18. He made his senior debut with S.L. Benfica's reserves on 6 August 2016, featuring 71 minutes in the 1–1 LigaPro home draw against C.D. Cova da Piedade.

Tavares scored a career-best 14 goals in the 2017–18 season, but the B team could only finish in 13th position. Highlights included braces in home victories over Varzim SC (2–1), Real Massamá (3–0) and C.F. União (2–1).

On 25 July 2018, Tavares was loaned to Moreirense FC. He played his first match in the Primeira Liga on 12 August, scoring in a 1–3 home loss to Sporting and also committing a penalty which resulted in the opposition's second goal. He repeated the feat the following round, helping to a 2–1 away defeat of C.D. Nacional.

For the 2019–20 campaign, Tavares signed with Boavista F.C. also on loan.

=== Brest ===
Tavares moved to the French Ligue 1 on 2 August 2020, signing a four-year contract with Stade Brestois 29 on a free transfer. He made his league debut 21 days later, playing 22 minutes in the 4–0 loss at Nîmes Olympique.

=== Famalicão ===
On 11 January 2021, Tavares was loaned to F.C. Famalicão until 30 June. He was bought outright in July, fracturing his left foot in December and being sidelined for three months.

On 31 August 2022, Tavares was loaned to Spanish side SD Ponferradina for one year.

=== Estoril ===
Tavares returned to Portugal and its top division in July 2023, on a three-year deal at G.D. Estoril Praia. He totalled 41 games and four goals in his only season, his first in the league coming on 10 December to close the 4–0 home win over G.D. Chaves.

=== Later career ===
On 6 July 2024, Tavares agreed to a contract at Israeli Premier League club Maccabi Netanya FC. Estoril remained entitled to a percentage on a future transfer.

== International career ==
=== Portugal ===
Across all youth levels, Tavares won 20 caps for Portugal and scored seven goals. He made his under-21 debut on 14 November 2017, coming on as a second-half substitute for Diogo Jota in a 2–1 home win against Switzerland for the 2019 UEFA European Championship qualifiers. The following 11 October, in the same stage, he netted four times in the 9–0 demolition of Liechtenstein.

=== Cape Verde ===
Tavares was called up to the Cape Verde national team for a set of friendlies on 20 May 2025. He made his debut nine days later, in a 1–1 draw with Malaysia. On 3 June, against the same opposition and also in Kuala Lumpur, he closed the 3–0 win.

== Career statistics ==
=== Club ===
As of match played 1 November 2026

Appearances and goals by club, season and competition
Club	Season	League			National Cup (Note: Includes Taça de Portugal, Copa del Rey, Israel State Cup, Cupa României)		League Cup (Note: Includes Taça da Liga, Toto Cup)		Europe		Other		Total	
Club	Season	Division	Apps	Goals	Apps	Goals	Apps	Goals	Apps	Goals	Apps	Goals	Apps	Goals
Benfica B	2016–17	LigaPro	41	11	—		—		—		—		41	11
Benfica B	2017–18	LigaPro	37	14	—		—		—		—		37	14
Benfica B	Total		78	25	—		—		—		—		78	25
Moreirense (loan)	2018–19	Primeira Liga	32	6	3	1	1	0	—		—		36	7
Boavista (loan)	2019–20	Primeira Liga	28	4	1	0	1	0	—		—		30	4
Brest	2020–21	Ligue 1	4	0	—		—		—		—		4	0
Famalicão (loan)	2020–21	Primeira Liga	17	2	—		—		—		—		17	2
Famalicão	2021–22	Primeira Liga	16	1	2	1	1	1	—		—		19	3
Famalicão	2022–23	Primeira Liga	4	0	—		—		—		—		4	0
Famalicão	Total		37	3	2	1	1	1	—		—		40	5
Ponferradina (loan)	2022–23	Segunda División	19	0	1	0	—		—		—		20	0
Estoril	2023–24	Primeira Liga	32	2	3	1	6	1	—		—		41	4
Maccabi Netanya	2024–25	Israeli Premier League	30	3	2	0	2	0	—		—		34	3
Maccabi Netanya	2025–26	Israeli Premier League	30	5	2	1	5	2	—		—		37	8
Maccabi Netanya	Total		60	8	4	1	7	2	—		—		71	11
Universitatea Craiova	2026–27	Liga I	7	0	2	0	—		6 (Note: Four appearances in UEFA Champions League, two appearances in UEFA Europa League)	0	1 (Note: Appearance in Supercupa României)	0	16	0
Career total			297	48	16	4	16	4	6	0	1	0	336	56

=== International ===
As of match played 17 November 2025.

Appearances and goals by national team and year
National team	Year	Apps	Goals
Cape Verde
Cape Verde	2025	6	1
Total		6	1

Scores and results list Cape Verde's goal tally first, score column indicates score after each Tavares goal.

List of international goals scored by Heriberto Tavares
No.	Date	Venue	Cap	Opponent	Score	Result	Competition
1	3 June 2025	Bukit Jalil National Stadium, Bukit Jalil, Malaysia	2	Malaysia	3–0	3–0	Friendly

== Honours ==
Estoril

- Taça da Liga runner-up: 2023–24

Universitatea Craiova

- Supercupa României: 2026
