= Rodrigo Martins =

Portuguese footballer

Personal information
- Full name: Rodrigo Miguel Forte Paes Martins
- Date of birth: 15 September 1998 (age 28)
- Place of birth: Faro, Portugal
- Height: 1.77 m (5 ft 10 in)
- Position: Winger

Team information
- Current team: Petrolul Ploiești
- Number: 7

Youth career
- 2007–2008: Oeiras
- 2008–2010: Belenenses
- 2010–2011: Foot-21
- 2011–2013: Oeiras
- 2013–2015: Linda-a-Velha
- 2015–2017: Estoril

Senior career*
Years	Team	Apps	(Gls)
2017–2018	Loures	30	(6)
2018–2020	Cova Piedade	25	(0)
2020	Covilhã	6	(0)
2020–2022	Mafra	61	(5)
2022–2024	Estoril	32	(3)
2024	Portimonense	9	(0)
2024–2025	Leixões	12	(1)
2025–2026	Lusitânia	17	(1)
2026–	Petrolul Ploiești	15	(4)
- * Club domestic league appearances and goals as of 6 November 2026

Rodrigo Miguel Forte Paes Martins (born 15 September 1998) is a Portuguese professional footballer who plays as a winger for Liga I club Petrolul Ploiești.

== Career ==
On 21 July 2018, Martins made his professional debut with Cova da Piedade in a 2018–19 Taça da Liga match against Varzim. In January 2020, Martins moved to Sporting da Covilhã where he made six appearances. He left the club on 16 July 2020 to join C.D. Mafra.

On 28 June 2022, Martins returned to his youth club Estoril, signing a three-year contract with the Primeira Liga side. On 29 January 2024, Estoril announced that Martins' contract had been terminated by mutual agreement.

The day after leaving Estoril, Martins signed a two-and-a-half-year contract with fellow Primeira Liga club Portimonense.

In October 2024, Martins joined Leixões.
