= Volnei Feltes =

Brazilian footballer (born 2000)

Volnei
Personal information
- Full name: Volnei Feltes
- Date of birth: 15 April 2000 (age 26)
- Place of birth: Bom Princípio, Brazil
- Height: 1.88 m (6 ft 2 in)
- Positions: Centre-back; right-back

Team information
- Current team: Torreense
- Number: 4

Youth career
- 2009–2015: Juventude
- 2015–2020: Internacional

Senior career*
Years	Team	Apps	(Gls)
2020–2025	Estoril	26	(0)
2022–2023	→ Oliveirense (loan)	28	(2)
2025–2026	Panserraikos	40	(2)
2026–	Torreense	4	(0)
- * Club domestic league appearances and goals as of 11 September 2026

Volnei Feltes (born 15 April 2000) is a Brazilian professional footballer who plays as a centre-back or a right-back for Liga Portugal 2 club Torreense.

== Career ==
Volnei began playing football with Juventude, before moving to the youth academy of Internacional in 2015. He moved to Portugal with Estoril on 23 July 2020. He helped their U23 side win the Liga Revelação Sub 23 for the 2020–21 season. He made his professional debut with Estoril in a 0–0 Primeira Liga tie with Paços de Ferreira on 31 January 2022.
