= Estádio António Coimbra da Mota =

Stadium in Estoril, Portugal

Coordinates: 38°42′57″N 9°24′23″W

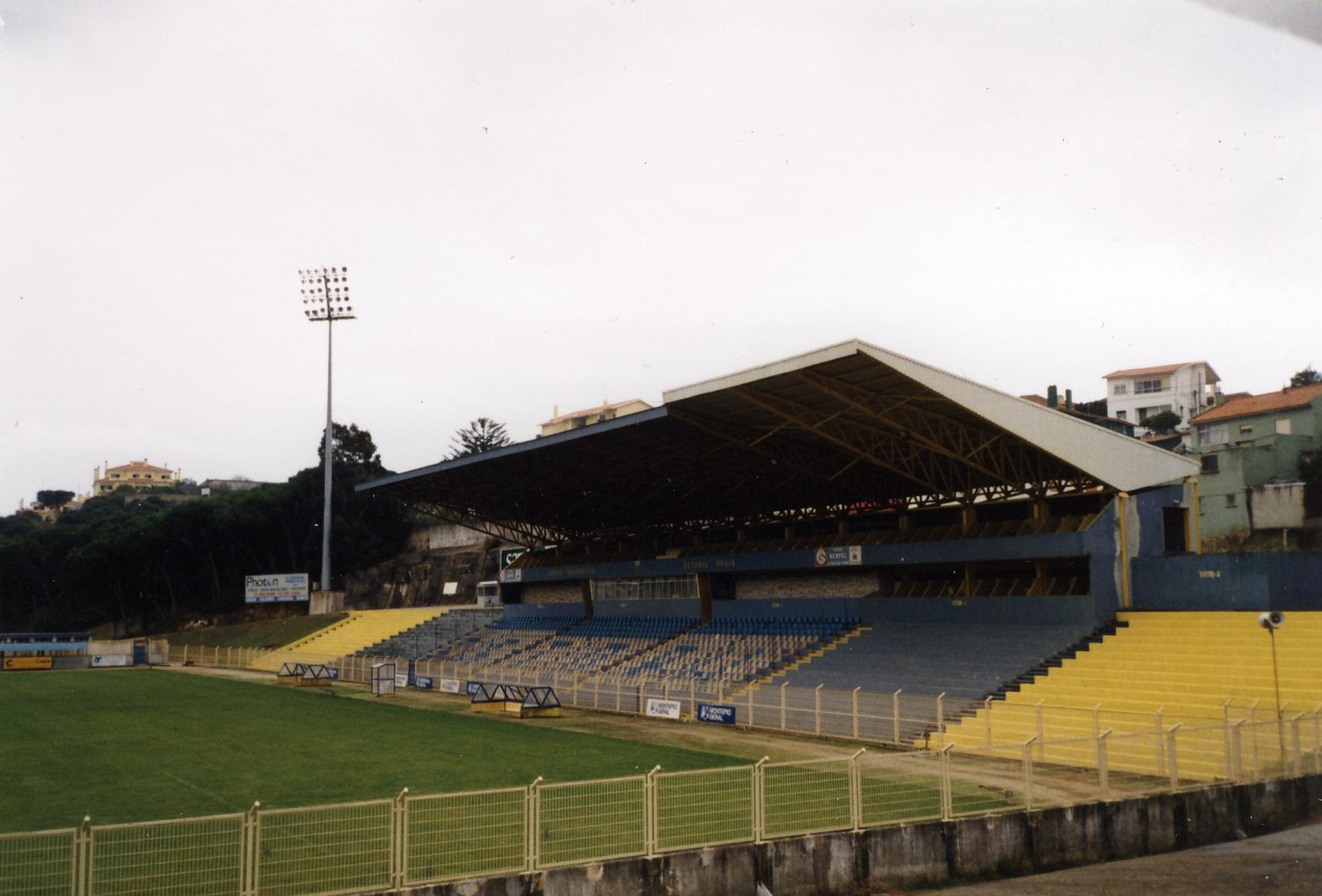
- Interactive map of Estádio António Coimbra da Mota
- Full name: Estádio António Coimbra da Mota
- Location: Alcabideche, Portugal
- Owner: Estoril Praia
- Capacity: 8,000; 5,094 (allowed)
- Surface: Grass
- Field size: 105 x 68 metres

Construction
- Built: 1938
- Opened: 1 January 1939
- Renovated: 2009–2010

Tenant
- Estoril Praia

The Estadio António Coimbra da Mota is a multi-use stadium in Estoril, Portugal. It is currently used mostly for football matches and is the home stadium of Primeira Liga side G.D. Estoril Praia.

The stadium has a capacity of 8,000, although current capacity is limited to just 5,094 seats, as the upper north stand is closed to the public due to structural defects in its foundations.

== Incidents ==
On 30 March 2011, the partial collapse of the Nascente Stand at the northern edge, in the area crossed at the bottom by the Ribeira da Amoreira canal, left a crater exposed due to ground subsidence in that area. According to statements by the former city councillor, "the training grounds to the north of the stadium have recurring problems, every four or five years."

On 15 January 2018, the same stand, which had been inaugurated in 2014, was at risk of collapsing, forcing the Special Forces of the National Republican Guard to evacuate the area, where FC Porto supporters were present. The FC Porto supporters eventually gathered on the pitch. The match was eventually halted at half-time, and the second half was played on 21 February 2018. Since then, the stand has been closed to the public, and the stadium has returned to its original capacity with only two stands available.

== Sports events ==
=== Football ===
The Swedish national football team used the stadium as a training ground in preparation for UEFA Euro 2004.

The stadium has also played host to matches of Portuguese youth team games most notably the Portugal national under-21 football team, the most recent match being on 9 September 2011 in a friendly match against the Slovakia national under-21 football team in a 1–1 draw.

On 31 March 2015, the Portugal national team played a match at this stadium, suffering a 0–2 defeat in a friendly against Cape Verde. Two years later, on 3 June 2017, the Portugal national team played another friendly match, this time against Cyprus, winning 4–0.

On 8 November 2018, the stadium hosted an international friendly between the United States and Portugal women's national teams.

=== Portugal national team matches ===
The following national team matches were held in the stadium.

#	Date	Score	Opponent	Competition
1.	31 March 2015	0–2	Cape Verde	Friendly
2.	3 June 2017	4–0	Cyprus	Friendly

=== Rugby ===
The stadium has also played host to games involving the Portuguese national rugby union team, most recently being against Ukraine in a 2006 European Nations Cup First Division match and against Uruguay in a 2007 Rugby World Cup repechage qualification match.
