= 2024–25 G.D. Estoril Praia season =

G.D. Estoril Praia
2024–25 season
- Head coach: Ian Cathro
- Stadium: Estádio António Coimbra da Mota
- Primeira Liga: 8th
- Taça de Portugal: Third round
- Top goalscorer: League: Alejandro Marqués (3); All: Alejandro Marqués (3)
- Average home league attendance: 2,723

The 2024–25 season was the 86th season in the history of Grupo Desportivo Estoril Praia, and the club's fourth consecutive season in Primeira Liga. In addition to the domestic league, the club participated in the Taça de Portugal.

== Transfers ==
=== In ===
| Pos. | Player | Transferred from | Fee | Date | Source |
|---|---|---|---|---|---|
| DF | (Austria) Felix Bacher | (Austria) WSG Tirol | Free | 25 July 2024 | |

=== Out ===
| Pos. | Player | Transferred to | Fee | Date | Source |
|---|---|---|---|---|---|
| GK | (Brazil) Marcelo Carné | (Saudi Arabia) Al-Jabalain | | 1 July 2024 | |
| DF | (Uruguay) Erick Cabaco | (Spain) Racing de Ferrol | End of contract | 1 July 2024 | |
| MF | (Portugal) Heriberto Tavares | (Israel) Maccabi Netanya | Undisclosed | 6 July 2024 | |
| FW | (Brazil) Cassiano | (Brazil) Avaí | €100,000 | 10 July 2024 | |
| FW | (Cape Verde) Benchimol | (Russia) FC Akron Tolyatti | Undisclosed | 22 July 2024 | |

== Friendlies ==
=== Pre-season ===
| 12 July 2024 Friendly | Sporting CP (Portugal) | 0–0 | (Portugal) Estoril | Alcochete |
| | | Report | | Stadium: Academia Cristiano Ronaldo |
Note: Two periods of 35 minutes

| 20 July 2024 Friendly | Estoril (Portugal) | 0–0 | (Portugal) Mafra |

| 24 July 2024 Friendly | Estrela da Amadora (Portugal) | 2–1 | (Portugal) Estoril |
| 10:30 UTC+1 | Rodrigo Pinho; Kikas | | Wagner Pina |

| 27 July 2024 Friendly | Estoril (Portugal) | 1–1 | (Portugal) União de Leiria |
| 10:30 |

| 31 July 2024 Friendly | FC Barreirense (Portugal) | v | (Portugal) Estoril |
| 17:00 UTC+1 |

== Competitions ==
=== Overall record ===
| Competition | First match | Last match | Starting round | Final position | Record | | | | | | | |
| Competition | First match | Last match | Starting round | Final position | Pld | W | D | L | GF | GA | GD | Win % |
|---|---|---|---|---|---|---|---|---|---|---|---|---|
| Primeira Liga | 9–12 August 2024 | May 2025 | Matchday 1 | | 15 | 3 | 5 | 7 | 12 | 24 | −12 | 20.00 |
| Taça de Portugal | 20 October 2024 | 20 October 2024 | Third round | Third round | 1 | 0 | 1 | 0 | 0 | 0 | +0 | 0.00 |
| Total | | | | | 16 | 3 | 6 | 7 | 12 | 24 | −12 | 18.75 |

Source: Soccerway

=== Primeira Liga ===
==== League table ====
| Pos | Team | Pld | W | D | L | GF | GA | GD | Pts |
|---|---|---|---|---|---|---|---|---|---|
| 6 | Vitória de Guimarães | 34 | 14 | 12 | 8 | 47 | 37 | +10 | 54 |
| 7 | Famalicão | 34 | 12 | 11 | 11 | 44 | 39 | +5 | 47 |
| 8 | Estoril | 34 | 12 | 10 | 12 | 48 | 53 | −5 | 46 |
| 9 | Casa Pia | 34 | 12 | 9 | 13 | 39 | 44 | −5 | 45 |
| 10 | Moreirense | 34 | 10 | 10 | 14 | 42 | 50 | −8 | 40 |

Source: Liga Portugal
Rules for classification: 1) Points; 2) Head-to-head points; 3) Head-to-head goal difference; 4) Goal difference; 5) Matches won; 6) Goals scored; 7) Play-off.

==== Matches ====
The match schedule was released on 7 July 2024.

| 11 August 2024 1 | Estoril | 1-4 | Santa Clara | Estoril |
| 15:30 | Marqués 19'; Pina (yellow card) 49'; Orellana (yellow card) 55'; Álvaro (yellow card) 79'; Mangala (yellow card) 80'; Lacximicant (yellow card) 81'; Zanocelo (yellow card) 87' | Report | Soares (yellow card) 34'; Lopes 44', (yellow card) 41'; Safira 70' (pen.), (yellow card) 80'; Ricardinho 74'; Costa 83' | Stadium: Estádio António Coimbra da Mota; Attendance: 1.968; Referee: João Pinheiro |

| 18 August 2024 2 | Vitória Guimarães | 1-0 | Estoril | Guimarães |
| 18:00 | Villanueva (yellow card) 10'; Borevković (yellow card) 26'; Ramírez 32' | Report | Begraoui (yellow card) 56' | Stadium: Estádio D. Afonso Henriques; Attendance: 17.331; Referee: André Narciso |

| 25 August 2024 3 | Estoril | 0-0 | Gil Vicente | Estoril |
| 18:00 | Costa (yellow card) 53'; Carvalho (yellow card) 73'; Zanocelo (yellow card) 87'; Mangala (yellow card) 89' | Report | Cruz (yellow card) 76' | Stadium: Estádio António Coimbra da Mota; Attendance: 2.010; Referee: Anzhony Rodrigues |

| 31 August 2024 4 | Boavista | 0-0 | Estoril | Porto |
| 18:00 | Ricardo Paiva (yellow card) 20'; Abascal (yellow card) 51'; Reisinho (yellow card) 90+3'; Cristiano Bacci (yellow card) 90+5' | Report | Carvalho (yellow card) 53'; Álvaro (yellow card) 77'; Xeka (yellow card) 82'; Joel Robles (yellow card) 90'; Mangala (yellow card) 90+2' | Stadium: Estádio do Bessa Século XXI; Attendance: 3.956; Referee: Gustavo Correia |

| 15 September 2024 5 | Estoril | 1-0 | Nacional | Estoril |
| 18:00 | Álvaro (yellow card) 5'; Carvalho 19'; Costa (yellow card) 52' | Report | Ulisses (red card) 65'; Zé Vítor (yellow card) 69' | Stadium: Estádio António Coimbra da Mota; Attendance: 2.128; Referee: Bruno Vieira |

| 21 September 2024 6 | Rio Ave | 2-2 | Estoril | Vila do Conde |
| 15:30 | Bondoso 9'; Clayton 59'; Pantalon (yellow card) 90'; Tıknaz (yellow card) 90+3' | Report | Zanocelo (yellow card) 27'; Marqués 64'; Pina 68'; Mangala (yellow card) 85' | Stadium: Estádio do Rio Ave FC; Attendance: 3.014; Referee: José Bessa |

| 27 September 2024 7 | Estoril | 0-3 | Sporting CP | Estoril |
| 20:15 | Garcia (yellow card) 50'; Álvaro (yellow card) 84' | Report | Catamo 24'; Morita 31'; Bragança 90+1' | Stadium: Estádio António Coimbra da Mota; Attendance: 4.658; Referee: João Gonçalves |

| 6 October 2024 8 | Farense | 1-0 | Estoril | Faro |
| 15:30 | Álex Bermejo (yellow card) 22'; Neto (yellow card) 42'; Raul Silva (yellow card) 77'; Artur Jorge (yellow card) 90'; Raul Silva 90+5' | Report | Kévin Boma (yellow card) 9'; Yanis Begraoui 15'; Michel (yellow card) 78'; Jandro Orellana (yellow card) 80' | Stadium: Estádio de São Luís; Attendance: 4,921; Referee: (Portugal) António Nobre |

| 26 October 2024 9 | Estoril | 4-1 | Arouca | Estoril |
| 15:30 | Garcia (yellow card) 21'; Marqués 30'; Amaral (yellow card) 40'; Pina 42'; Álvaro 64'; Robles (yellow card) 76'; Holsgrove 90'; Costa (yellow card) 90+4' | Report | Araújo 24'; Esgaio (yellow card) 36'; Loum (yellow card) 89' | Stadium: Estádio António Coimbra da Mota; Attendance: 1.686; Referee: Carlos Macedo |

| 3 November 2024 10 | Porto | 4-0 | Estoril | Porto |
| 20:30 | Loader 19'; Pepê 28'; Galeno 77', 87' | Report | Álvaro (yellow card) 36'; Carvalho (yellow card) 67' | Stadium: Estádio do Dragão; Attendance: 39,019; Referee: David Rafael Silva |

| 9 November 2024 11 | Estoril | 0-0 | AVS | Estoril |
| 15:30 | Holsgrove (yellow card) 83'; Zanocelo (yellow card) 87' | Report | | Stadium: Estádio António Coimbra da Mota; Attendance: 1.912; Referee: Gonçalo Neves |

| 1 December 2024 12 | Estoril | 2-1 | Famalicão | Estoril |
| 15:30 | Carvalho 5'; Zanocelo (yellow card) 8'; Marqués 30' (pen.); Pina (yellow card) 66' | Report | Gil Dias (yellow card) 33'; Aranda 45+1' (pen.), (yellow card) 90'; Soares (yellow card) 55'; Riccieli (yellow card) 90' | Stadium: Estádio António Coimbra da Mota; Attendance: 2.047; Referee: João Gonçalves |

| 6 December 2024 13 | Braga | 2-2 | Estoril | Braga |
| 20:15 | Bruma 16', 56' (pen.); Martínez (yellow card) 52'; Arrey-Mbi (yellow card) 68'; Fernández (yellow card) 90+8' | Report | Bacher (yellow card) 54'; Marqués 68' (pen.); Costa 82', (yellow card) 72'; Lacximicant (yellow card) 85'; Carvalho (yellow card) 90+8' | Stadium: Estádio Municipal de Braga; Attendance: 9.071; Referee: Bruno Vieira |

| 15 December 2024 14 | Estoril | 0-2 | Casa Pia | Estoril |
| 20:30 | Costa (yellow card) 38'; Garcia (yellow card) 40'; Boma (yellow card) 61' | Report | Segovia 56'; Livolant (yellow card) 61'; Cassiano 63'; Goulart (yellow card) 68' | Stadium: Estádio António Coimbra da Mota; Attendance: - Referee: Tiago Martins |

| 23 December 2024 15 | Benfica | 3-0 | Estoril | Lisbon |
| 20:45 | Pavlidis 28'; Kökçü (yellow card) 67'; Amdouni 73', 90+4' | Report | Boma (yellow card) 34' | Stadium: Estádio da Luz; Attendance: 60,572; Referee: António Nobre (Leiria) |

| 28 December 2024 16 | Estoril | 2-2 | Moreirense | Estoril |
| 18:00 | | Report | | Stadium: Estádio António Coimbra da Mota |

| 5 January 2025 17 | Estrela Amadora | 2-4 | Estoril | Amadora |

| 18 January 2025 18 | Santa Clara | 2-3 | Estoril | Ponta Delgada |

| 26 January 2025 19 | Estoril | 1-0 | Vitoria Guimaraes | Estoril |
| | | | | Stadium: Estádio António Coimbra da Mota |

=== Taça de Portugal ===
| 20 October 2024 Third round | Lusitano de Évora | 0–0 (4–3 p) | Estoril | Évora |
| 20:15 WEST (UTC+01:00) | Andrade (yellow card) 86' (yellow-red card) 86' | Report | Amaral (yellow card) 33'; Pina (yellow card) 90+2'; Sierra (yellow card) 117'; Boma (yellow card) 120' | Stadium: Campo da Estrela; Attendance: - Referee: Sérgio Guelho |
| | Penalties |
| | Santos (penalty scored); Alex Reis (penalty scored); Lopes (penalty scored); Pinto (penalty scored) | | (penalty scored) Zanocelo; (penalty scored) Begraoui; (penalty scored) Marqués |
