= Nuno Silva (football manager) =

Portuguese football manager (born 1987)

Personal information
- Full name: Nuno André Batalha da Silva
- Date of birth: 13 April 1987 (age 39)
- Place of birth: Ericeira, Portugal

Managerial career
- Years: Team
- 2025–2026: Vizela
- 2026–: Paços de Ferreira

Nuno André Batalha da Silva (born 13 April 1987) is a Portuguese football manager.

== Career ==
Born in Ericeira, Silva was assistant to Luís Freire for 14 years, at Mafra, Nacional, Estoril and Rio Ave. In July 2025 he presented Freire as the new manager of the Portugal national under-21 team, but did not join him.

On 15 December 2025, aged 38, Silva was hired in his first job as a head coach. He was appointed at Vizela for the remainder of the Liga Portugal 2 season, with the option of a second season. His debut five days later was a goalless draw at home to fellow promotion challenger Académico de Viseu. He won once and drew three of his eight games, and was dismissed on 15 February 2026 with the team in 8th after a home defeat to Marítimo.

Silva was appointed on 5 July 2026 as manager of Paços de Ferreira, newly relegated to Liga 3. After losing all three of his games, he left by mutual consent on 24 August.
