= Tiago Parente (footballer, born 2004) =

Portuguese footballer

Personal information
- Full name: Tiago Parreira Parente
- Date of birth: 14 January 2004 (age 22)
- Place of birth: Sintra, Portugal
- Height: 1.78 m (5 ft 10 in)
- Position: Left-back

Team information
- Current team: Estoril
- Number: 55

Youth career
- 2012: Casa Pia
- 2013–2017: Belenenses
- 2017–2025: Estoril
- 2022–2024: → Sporting CP (loan)

Senior career*
| Years | Team | Apps | (Gls) |
| 2025– | Estoril | 15 | (2) |
| 2026 | → Felgueiras (loan) | 12 | (0) |

International career^{‡}
| 2022 | Portugal U18 | 1 | (0) |
| 2023 | Portugal U20 | 3 | (0) |
| 2025– | Portugal U21 | 7 | (2) |
- * Club domestic league appearances and goals as of 20 June 2026 ‡ National team caps and goals as of 21:26, 13 August 2026 (UTC)

Tiago Parreira Parente (born 14 January 2004) is a Portuguese professional footballer who plays as a left-back for Primeira Liga club Estoril and the Portugal national under-21 team.

== Club career ==
Born in Sintra in the Lisbon District, Parente played as a youth for Casa Pia A.C. and C.F. Os Belenenses, both in the capital city, before joining G.D. Estoril Praia in 2017. On 25 July 2022, having already represented Estoril's under-23 team at age 18, he was loaned for two years to Sporting CP and their under-19 team.

On 17 May 2025, Parente made his professional debut on the last day of the Primeira Liga season, playing the last 18 minutes as a substitute in a 4–0 home win over C.F. Estrela da Amadora. He had spent the campaign in the under-23 team, scoring once and assisting twice in 20 games, while training with the first team under manager Ian Cathro.

Parente signed a new contract on 10 July 2025, linking him to the Canarinho until 2029. On 11 August, the new season began with Estrela again the visitors to the Estádio António Coimbra da Mota; Parente played the full game and scored the first goal of a 1–1 draw, assisted by right-back Pedro Carvalho. After 15 games and two goals, he was loaned to F.C. Felgueiras in Liga Portugal 2 on 2 February 2026. He played 12 more games, without scoring, as his team finished 11th.

== International career ==
Parente was part of the Portugal under-18 team that competed at the 2022 Mediterranean Games in Oran, Algeria. After playing three times for the under-20 team in late 2023, he had his first call-up to the under-21 team in August 2025, in new manager Luís Freire's first squad. He made his debut on 5 September by playing the entirety of a 5–0 home win over Azerbaijan in Barcelos in 2027 UEFA European Under-21 Championship qualification; on 10 October he scored his first goal for the team in another qualifier, a 3–0 win over Bulgaria in Portimão.
