= Fort of Paimogo =

17th Century fort in Portugal

- Forte de Paimogo
- Lisbon District; Near Lourinhã in Portugal
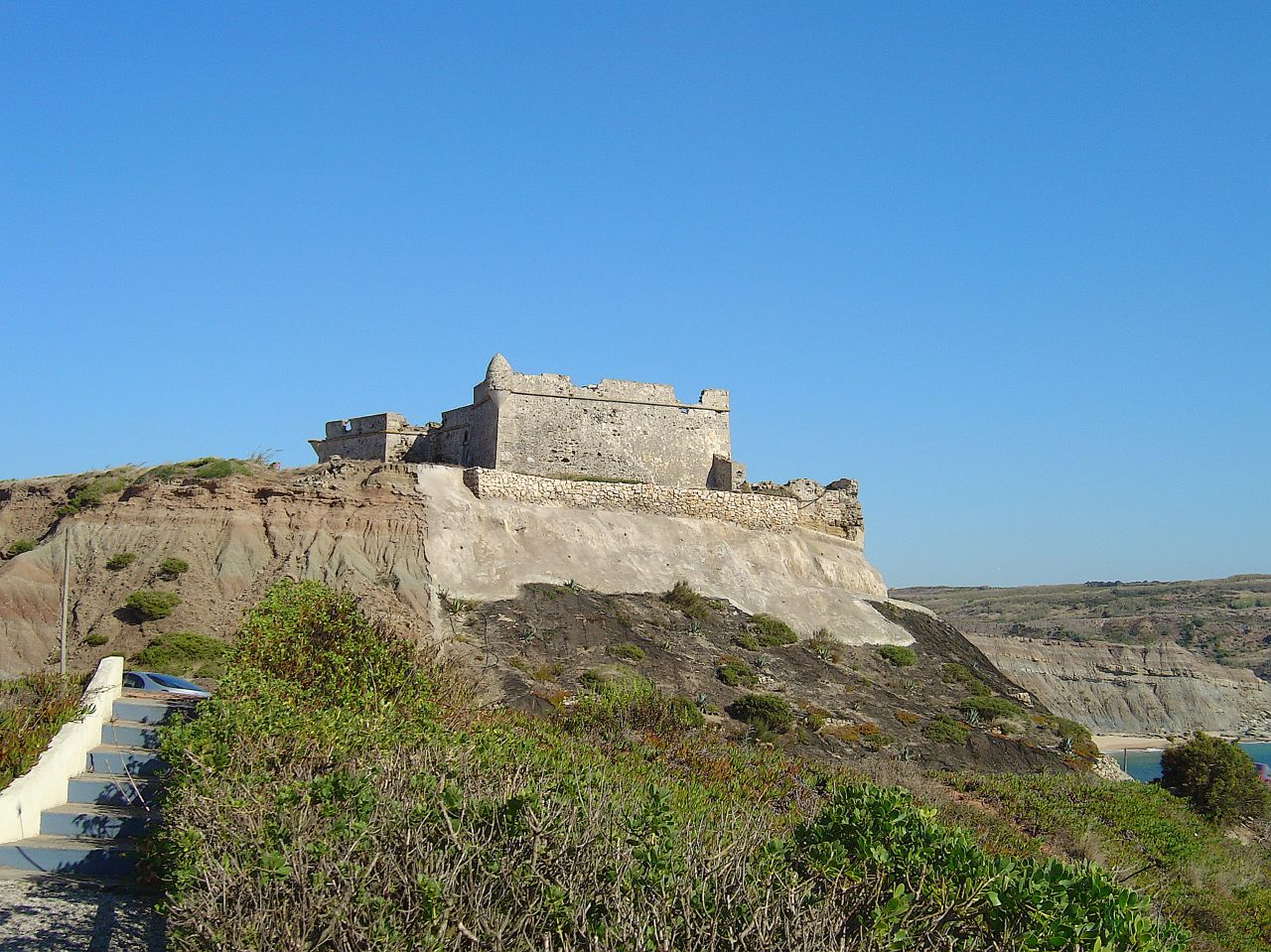
- View of the fort from the west

Site information
- Type: Bastion fort
- Open to the public: yes
- Condition: Good, but potential for erosion

Location
- Coordinates: 39°17′14″N 9°20′26″W

Site history
- Built: 1674
- Battles/wars: Portuguese Restoration War

The Fort of Paimogo, also known as the Fort of Our Lady of the Angels of Paimogo (Portuguese: Forte de Nossa Senhora dos Anjos de Paimogo), stands in a dominant position on Paimogo beach near the town of Lourinhã, Lisbon District in Portugal Constructed in 1674, it ceased to serve a military function in 1834 and is now under threat from coastal erosion. The fort presents an almost unique example of a fort from that period that has not undergone subsequent modification.

== History ==
The fort was one of those built on the instructions of António Luís de Meneses, 1st Marquis of Marialva and hero of the Portuguese Restoration War, with the intention of defending the Portuguese coastline from Peniche to the estuary of the river Tagus at Cascais to the south in order to offer protection from the constant maritime threat presented by Spanish troops and Barbary pirates. It was located on the Paimogo Beach, which provided easy access for invaders.

Paimogo fort is rectangular, reinforced at the corners by towers topped by a conical vault. In design it is similar to the Fort of Milreu in Ericeira to the south, which was built at the same time. After construction it was manned in 1675 by six gunners and six other soldiers, with six artillery pieces. By 1735 the number of weapons had increased to eight. In 1796 an inspection revealed that its general state of conservation was poor and by 1804 its garrison consisted of just five gunners and five marines. In 1808 during the Peninsular War the fort provided covering fire for British forces landing at Paimogo who reinforced the Anglo-Portuguese troops of the Duke of Wellington and took part in the Battle of Roliça and Battle of Vimeiro. During the Portuguese Civil War (1828-1834) the fort was manned by just five soldiers. After that conflict it ceased to have a military function and was abandoned and used by a local farmer.

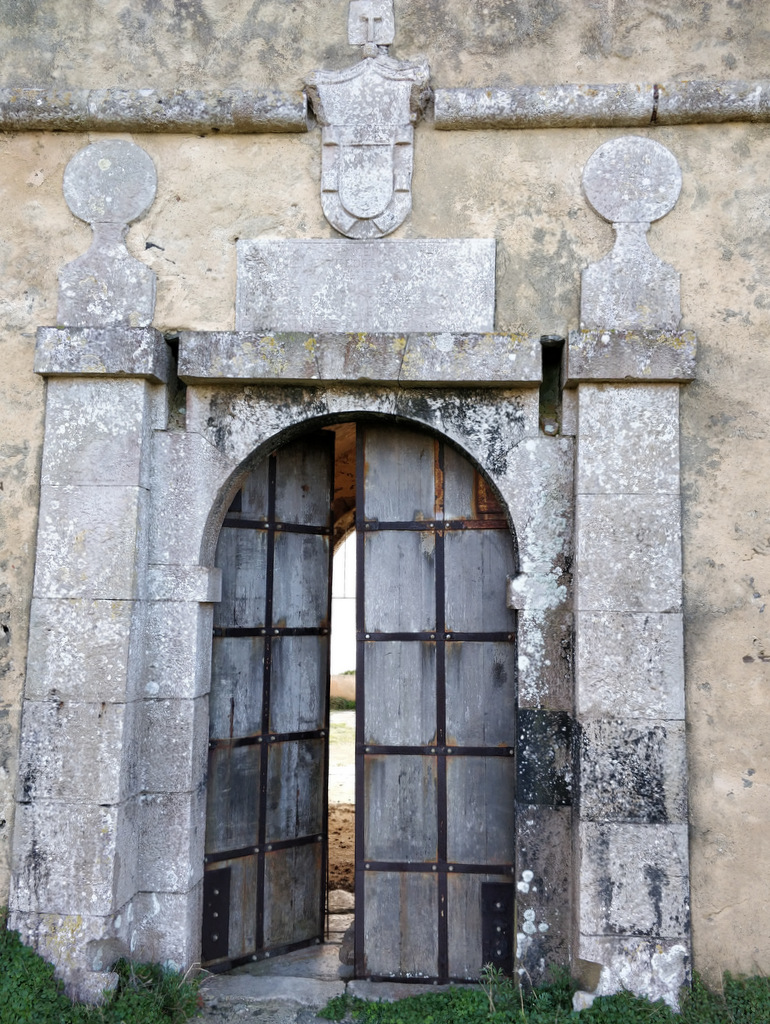
Entrance to the Fort of Paimogo

== Geological Heritage ==
The location of Paimogo fort is close to areas of cliffs where dinosaur nesting took place. Several fossilized eggs and remains of theropod embryos, sauropod Zby atlanticus and other animals of the Upper Jurassic period have been found there, some of which can be seen in the Lourinhã museum.

In 1980 there were plans for the fort to be used as a centre for tourists interested in the dinosaur fossils but the plan was not advanced. Some repairs were carried out in the late 1990s and early 2000s, including erosion protection. In the second half of 2004 ownership was signed over to the Lourinhã Council, which planned to incorporate the fort in a proposed “Dinosaur Route” planned by the Institute for Nature Conservation and Forests. However, there has been little visible progress and erosion continues to be a potential problem.
