= Pedro Carvalho =

Pedro Carvalho may refer to:

- Pedro Carvalho (rugby union) (born 1984), Portuguese rugby union player
- Pedro Carvalho (actor) (born 1985), Portuguese actor
- Pedro Carvalho (fighter) (born 1995), Portuguese mixed martial artist
- Pedro Carvalho (footballer) (born 2003), Portuguese footballer
