= Tiago Brito (footballer) =

Portuguese footballer

Personal information
- Full name: Tiago Araújo Brito
- Date of birth: 16 April 2004 (age 22)
- Place of birth: Viana do Castelo, Portugal
- Height: 1.90 m (6 ft 3 in)
- Position: Defensive midfielder

Team information
- Current team: Estoril

Youth career
- 2011–2015: Vianense
- 2015–2016: Póvoa Lanhoso
- 2016: Vianense
- 2017–2018: Benfica
- 2018–2020: Braga
- 2019–2020: → Palmeiras Braga (loan)
- 2020–2021: Famalicão
- 2021–2024: Vizela
- 2024–2025: Estoril

Senior career*
Years	Team	Apps	(Gls)
2025–	Estoril	8	(0)
2026	→ Oliveirense (loan)	13	(0)
- * Club domestic league appearances and goals as of 20 June 2026

Tiago Araújo Brito (born 16 April 2004) is a Portuguese professional footballer who plays as a defensive midfielder for Primeira Liga club Estoril.

== Career ==
Born in Viana do Castelo, Brito played for several clubs in youth football. Following three years at F.C. Vizela, he arrived at G.D. Estoril Praia at under-23 level in 2024.

After playing 24 games in 2024–25, Brito was called up to Estoril's first team by manager Ian Cathro. He made his professional debut in the Primeira Liga on 19 April, as a half-time substitute for Yanis Begraoui in a 2–0 home loss to S.C. Braga; he was praised by his manager. Having added three more appearances for the rest of the campaign, he was given a new contract lasting until 2029.

On 28 January 2026, Brito was sent on loan to Liga Portugal 2 side Oliveirense until the end of the 2025–26 season.

== Personal life ==
Brito's father Rogério played in the Primeira Liga for C.F. Os Belenenses and Spain's Segunda División for U.D. Salamanca, while older brother Diogo played in Liga Portugal 2 for F.C. Penafiel.
