= Tiago Parente =

Tiago Parente may refer to:

- Tiago Parente (footballer, born 2004), Portuguese football left-back (Estoril, Felgueiras)
- Tiago Parente (footballer, born 2006), Portuguese football left-back (Benfica, Swansea City)
