= Wagner Pina =

Cape Verdean footballer (born 2002)

- Pina with Trabzonspor in 2025

Personal information
- Full name: Wagner Fabrício Cardoso de Pina
- Date of birth: 3 November 2002 (age 24)
- Place of birth: Lisbon, Portugal
- Height: 1.80 m (5 ft 11 in)
- Position: Right-back

Team information
- Current team: Trabzonspor
- Number: 20

Youth career
- 2011–2015: Povoense
- 2015–2020: Sacavenense
- 2020–2021: Tondela

Senior career*
Years	Team	Apps	(Gls)
2021–2022	CD Gouveia	23	(1)
2022–2023	Belenenses	18	(1)
2023–2025	Estoril	52	(2)
2025–	Trabzonspor	36	(0)

International career^{‡}
2024–	Cape Verde	16	(0)
- * Club domestic league appearances and goals as of 20 September 2026 ‡ National team caps and goals as of 29 September 2026

Wagner Fabrício Cardoso de Pina (Portuguese: [ˈvag.nɛɾ fɐ.ˈbɾi.si.u kɐɾ.ˈdo.zu dɨ ˈpi.nɐ]; born 3 November 2002) is a professional footballer who plays as a right-back for Süper Lig club Trabzonspor. Born in Portugal, he plays for the Cape Verde national team.

== Club career ==
In 2021, Pina started his professional career with CD Gouveia in the Campeonato de Portugal and the following year he moved to Belenenses in Liga 3, joining in July 2022. The following season he joined Estoril and predominantly played initially with their U23 side, but made his senior debut in the Taça da Liga in a victory against Paços de Ferreira in July 2023. He made his debut in the Primeira Liga on 28 October 2023 against Portimonense and began playing regularly at right-back from the team that autumn. On 24 November 2023, he renewed his contract until 2027.

On 21 June 2025, Süper Lig club Trabzonspor announced the signing of Pina on a four-year contract, for a fee of €3 million.

== International career ==
Pina made his debut for the Cape Verde national team on 21 March 2024, in a 1–0 win against Guyana. In May 2024, he was called up for his first competitive fixtures in 2026 World Cup Qualifying matches against Cameroon and Libya.

On 18 May 2026, he was called up by Cape Verde's head coach Bubista for the 2026 FIFA World Cup.

== Career statistics ==
=== Club ===
As of match played 20 September 2026

Appearances and goals by club, season and competition
Club	Season	League			National cup		League cup		Europe		Other		Total	
Club	Season	Division	Apps	Goals	Apps	Goals	Apps	Goals	Apps	Goals	Apps	Goals	Apps	Goals
CD Gouveia	2021–22	Campeonato de Portugal	23	1	—		—		—		—		23	1
Belenenses	2022–23	Liga 3	18	1	2	0	—		—		—		20	1
Estoril	2023–24	Primeira Liga	22	0	3	0	4	0	—		—		29	0
Estoril	2024–25	Primeira Liga	30	2	1	0	0	0	—		—		31	2
Estoril	Total		52	2	4	0	4	0	—		—		60	2
Trabzonspor	2025–26	Süper Lig	31	0	8	0	—		—		1 (Note: Appearance in Turkish Super Cup)	0	40	0
Trabzonspor	2026–27	Süper Lig	5	0	0	0	—		2 (Note: Appearances in UEFA Europa League)	0	—		7	0
Trabzonspor	Total		36	0	0	0	—		2	0	—		38	0
Career total			129	4	14	0	4	0	2	0	1	0	150	4

=== International ===
As of match played 29 September 2026

Appearances and goals by national team and year
National team	Year	Apps	Goals
Cape Verde	2024	6	0
Cape Verde	2025	4	0
Cape Verde	2026	6	0
Total		16	0

== Honours ==
Trabzonspor

- Turkish Cup: 2025–26
