= Matheus Nunes =

Portugal international footballer (born 1998)

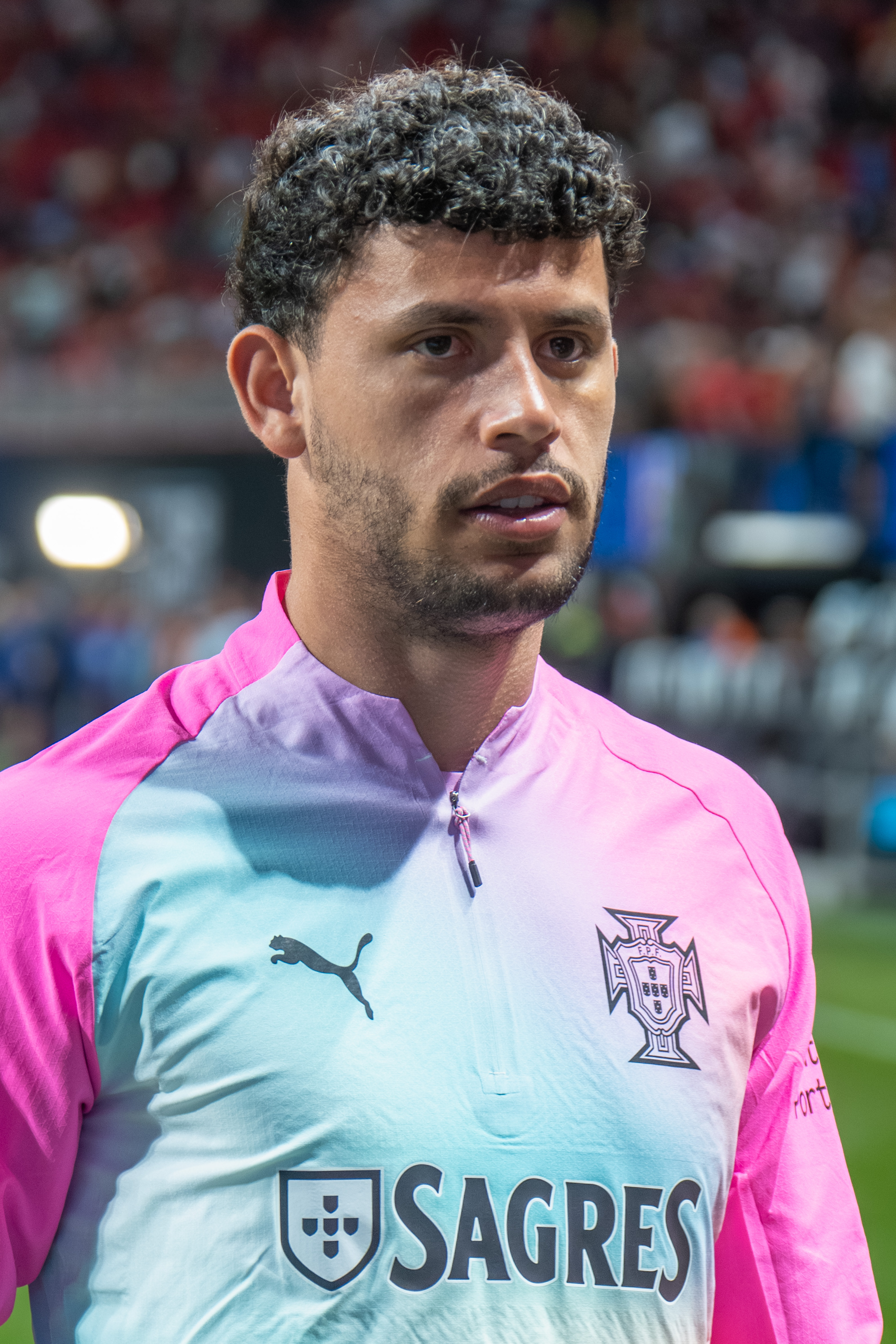
- Nunes with Portugal in 2026

Personal information
- Full name: Matheus Luiz Nunes
- Date of birth: 27 August 1998 (age 28)
- Place of birth: Rio de Janeiro, Brazil
- Height: 1.84 m (6 ft 0 in)
- Positions: Right-back; midfielder

Team information
- Current team: Manchester City
- Number: 27

Youth career
- 2012–2016: Ericeirense

Senior career*
| Years | Team | Apps | (Gls) |
| 2016–2018 | Ericeirense | 13 | (2) |
| 2018–2019 | Estoril | 6 | (0) |
| 2019–2022 | Sporting CP | 76 | (7) |
| 2022–2023 | Wolverhampton Wanderers | 36 | (1) |
| 2023– | Manchester City | 80 | (2) |

International career^{‡}
| 2021– | Portugal | 21 | (2) |
- * Club domestic league appearances and goals as of 23:56, 20 September 2026 (UTC) ‡ National team caps and goals as of 13:00, 28 June 2026 (UTC)

Matheus Luiz Nunes (born 27 August 1998) is a professional footballer who plays as a right-back or midfielder for Premier League club Manchester City and the Portugal national team. Predominantly a midfielder earlier in his career, Nunes has since also been deployed as a right-back and winger later in his career.

Nunes started his career with Ericeirense, before moving to LigaPro side Estoril. During his time with the club, Nunes played mostly in the reserve team, before moving to Primeira Liga side Sporting CP in January 2019. With Sporting, Nunes won a Primeira Liga title and back-to-back Taças da Liga in 2021 and 2022, while being part of the squad that won a double in 2021. In August, Nunes signed with Premier League side Wolverhampton Wanderers for a club-record transfer worth €45 million (£38 million), before moving to fellow Premier League side Manchester City the following season.

Born in Brazil, Nunes moved to Portugal at 12 years old. He opted to play for the Portugal national team, and made his senior international debut in 2021, representing the side at the FIFA World Cup in 2022 and 2026 and the UEFA European Championship in 2024.

== Club career ==
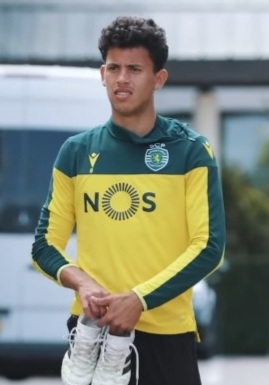
Nunes training with Sporting CP in 2021

=== Early career ===
Nunes was born in Rio de Janeiro. After his father left his family, Nunes moved to Ericeira, Lisbon District at the age of 12 with his mother and his English stepfather. He started playing football with local side Ericeirense in the 6th division, and to help his family he also worked at his godfather's bakery for a short period while playing.

Nunes made his senior debut for Ericeirense during the 2015–16 season, in the Lisbon Football Association. He started the 2017 pre-season on trial at Oriental, but was not signed due to a thigh injury, and subsequently returned to his first club.

=== Estoril ===
Nunes signed with Estoril in the summer of 2018. He made his debut in the LigaPro on 14 October in a 2–2 draw against Varzim, starting but leaving injured shortly before the end of the first half. During most of his spell, he was associated to the reserve team.

=== Sporting CP ===
On 29 January 2019, Nunes joined Sporting CP of the Primeira Liga on a five-and-a-half-year contract for a €500,000 fee for half of his economic rights, and a €45 million buyout clause. His performances against Sporting for Estoril in the Taça da Liga group stage in the 2018–19 season was noted by Sporting scouting team, who decided to sign him.

After playing for the club's under-23 team, Nunes received his first call-up to the first team by manager Ruben Amorim on 4 June 2020, coming on as a second-half substitute in the 2–2 draw at Vitória de Guimarães in the Primeira Liga. On 23 October, he agreed to a contract extension by a further year, increasing his buyout clause from €45 million to €60 million, with the club deciding to pay Estoril €450,000 for the other half of his economic rights.

Nunes scored his first goal in the Portuguese top division on 2 January 2021, closing the 2–0 home victory over Braga. His second came the following 1 February, in injury time to help the hosts defeat Benfica 1–0 in the Lisbon derby, being named man of the match. Following the departure of João Mário, he earned a permanent place in the starting eleven, and on 15 September, on in his UEFA Champions League debut, he provided an assist for Paulinho in a 5–1 away defeat to Ajax. After helping Sporting on a run of six consecutive league wins, including the Lisbon derby against Benfica, where provided an assist and scored a goal in a 3–1 away victory, Nunes was named the league's Midfielder of the Month for the months of October and November.

On 15 February 2022, in the first leg of the round of 16 tie of the Champions League, despite his team 5–0 home loss to Manchester City, Pep Guardiola, who was impressed by the calibre of Nunes' performances, praised him as "one of the best players in the world".

=== Wolverhampton Wanderers ===
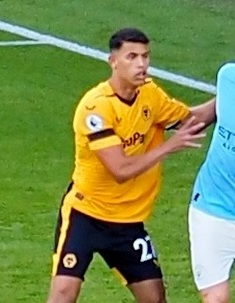
Nunes playing for Wolverhampton Wanderers in 2022

On 17 August 2022, Nunes signed a five-year contract with English Premier League club Wolverhampton Wanderers for a club-record transfer worth €45 million (£38 million), surpassing the former record signing compatriot Fábio Silva.

Nunes made his Wolves debut three days later, as a starter in a 1–0 defeat against Tottenham Hotspur at the Tottenham Hotspur Stadium in the Premier League on 20 August 2022. Nunes made his home Premier League debut in a 1–1 draw with Newcastle United at Molineux on 28 August 2022. Nunes scored his first goal for Wolves in their 1–0 home win against Chelsea on 8 April 2023.

During the early stages of the 2023–24 season, Nunes began a dispute with Wolves over his desire to leave the club after they had rejected a transfer bid for him worth £47 million from Manchester City. Nunes failed to turn up for training with the club, without the permission of manager Gary O'Neil for two consecutive days in a bid to secure a move away from the club, and was subsequently fined.

=== Manchester City ===
On 30 August 2023, it was reported that a £53 million bid from Manchester City with no additional add-ons had been agreed. The transfer was confirmed on 1 September 2023. The Portuguese international signed a five-year deal with the reigning European and English champions.

Nunes made his Manchester City debut on 16 September, coming off the bench to replace Phil Foden on the 67th minute of a 3–1 league victory away at West Ham United. Three days later, he made his first start for the Citizens, playing the full 90 minutes in a 3–1 home win over Red Star Belgrade in the UEFA Champions League. Four days later, Nunes made his first Premier League start for City, playing the full match in a 2–0 home victory over Nottingham Forest, where he assisted Erling Haaland for the second goal. Nunes won his first trophy at City on 22 December, as the team beat Fluminense 4–0, with Nunes assisting Julian Álvarez's winning goal in the 2023 FIFA Club World Cup final.

Nunes scored his first City goal on 24 September 2024 in the EFL Cup, scoring the decisive goal in a 2–1 home win over Watford in the third round. He scored his first Champions League goal on 23 October against Sparta Prague with a penalty, while also recording two assists in a 5–0 home win. On 22 April 2025, Nunes scored his first Premier League goal, a 94th minute winner, in a 2–1 home victory over Aston Villa.

On 27 September 2025, Nunes scored his first goal of the 2025–26 season in a 5–1 home victory over Burnley in the league.

== International career ==
On 8 August 2021, after living in the country for ten years, Nunes received his Portuguese passport. Later that month, on his 23rd birthday, he was called up by Brazil national team manager Tite as one of nine replacements for the players based in the United Kingdom, for three 2022 FIFA World Cup qualifiers against Chile, Argentina and Peru; He refused the call, as he would have had to quarantine on return due not having the complete COVID-19 vaccination. Ultimately, Nunes decided not to represent his country of birth, after he was contacted by Portugal's national team manager Fernando Santos, who convinced him to represent Portugal.

Nunes was called by Santos on 30 September 2021 for World Cup qualifiers against Luxembourg and a friendly with Qatar. He won his first cap on 9 October, starting the 3–0 friendly win over Qatar in the Algarve. He scored his first international goal the following 22 March in a 3–1 home win over Turkey in the semi-finals of the qualification play-offs.

In October, he was named in Portugal's preliminary 55-man squad for the 2022 FIFA World Cup in Qatar, being included in the final 26-man squad for the tournament.

On 3 June 2024, he was named in the squad for the UEFA Euro 2024, as a replacement to the injured Otávio, where Portugal was eliminated from the tournament by France in the quarter-finals, after losing 5–3 in a penalty shootout.

On 19 May 2026, Nunes was selected in the 26-man squad for the 2026 FIFA World Cup.

== Style of play ==
Nunes is usually deployed in double pivot in 3–4–3 formation, operating as a number 8 looking to get forward and contribute to the attack and also has a good passing range, as he can make different types of passes whether he is looking to switch the play or try and break lines with penetrative passes, or passes that split the opposition backline, which he is highly effective at. He also has the ability to carry the ball and make progressive runs, using a combination of speed and strength to make these runs, while also displaying good technique on the ball. Nunes also possesses good anticipation and reading of the game, which allows him to make effective interceptions and challenges.

== Career statistics ==
=== Club ===
As of match played 20 September 2026

Appearances and goals by club, season and competition
| Club | Season | League | | | National cup (Note: Includes Taça de Portugal, FA Cup) | | League cup (Note: Includes Taça da Liga, EFL Cup) | | Europe | | Other | | Total | |
| Club | Season | Division | Apps | Goals | Apps | Goals | Apps | Goals | Apps | Goals | Apps | Goals | Apps | Goals |
|---|---|---|---|---|---|---|---|---|---|---|---|---|---|---|
| Ericeirense | 2015–16 | Lisbon FA | 8 | 1 | — | | — | | — | | — | | 8 | 1 |
| Ericeirense | 2016–17 | Lisbon FA | 5 | 1 | — | | — | | — | | — | | 5 | 1 |
| Ericeirense | Total | | 13 | 2 | — | | — | | — | | — | | 13 | 2 |
| Estoril | 2018–19 | LigaPro | 6 | 0 | 0 | 0 | 2 | 0 | — | | — | | 8 | 0 |
| Sporting CP | 2019–20 | Primeira Liga | 10 | 0 | 0 | 0 | 0 | 0 | — | | — | | 10 | 0 |
| Sporting CP | 2020–21 | Primeira Liga | 31 | 3 | 3 | 0 | 3 | 0 | 2 (Note: Appearances in UEFA Europa League) | 0 | — | | 39 | 3 |
| Sporting CP | 2021–22 | Primeira Liga | 33 | 3 | 6 | 1 | 4 | 0 | 6 (Note: Appearances in UEFA Champions League) | 0 | 1 (Note: Appearance in Supertaça Cândido de Oliveira) | 0 | 50 | 4 |
| Sporting CP | 2022–23 | Primeira Liga | 2 | 1 | — | | — | | — | | — | | 2 | 1 |
| Sporting CP | Total | | 76 | 7 | 9 | 1 | 7 | 0 | 8 | 0 | 1 | 0 | 109 | 8 |
| Wolverhampton Wanderers | 2022–23 | Premier League | 34 | 1 | 2 | 0 | 3 | 0 | — | | — | | 39 | 1 |
| Wolverhampton Wanderers | 2023–24 | Premier League | 2 | 0 | — | | — | | — | | — | | 2 | 0 |
| Wolverhampton Wanderers | Total | | 36 | 1 | 2 | 0 | 3 | 0 | — | | — | | 41 | 1 |
| Manchester City | 2023–24 | Premier League | 17 | 0 | 2 | 0 | 1 | 0 | 7 | 0 | 2 (Note: Appearance in FIFA Club World Cup) | 0 | 29 | 0 |
| Manchester City | 2024–25 | Premier League | 26 | 1 | 3 | 0 | 2 | 2 | 7 | 1 | 5 (Note: One appearance in FA Community Shield, four appearances in FIFA Club World Cup) | 0 | 43 | 4 |
| Manchester City | 2025–26 | Premier League | 34 | 1 | 4 | 0 | 5 | 0 | 6 | 0 | — | | 49 | 1 |
| Manchester City | 2026–27 | Premier League | 3 | 0 | 0 | 0 | 0 | 0 | 1 | 0 | 0 | 0 | 4 | 0 |
| Manchester City | Total | | 80 | 2 | 9 | 0 | 8 | 2 | 21 | 1 | 7 | 0 | 125 | 5 |
| Career total | | | 211 | 12 | 20 | 1 | 18 | 2 | 29 | 1 | 8 | 0 | 288 | 16 |

=== International ===
As of match played 27 June 2026

Appearances and goals by national team and year
| National team | Year | Apps | Goals |
|---|---|---|---|
| Portugal | 2021 | 3 | 0 |
| Portugal | 2022 | 8 | 1 |
| Portugal | 2023 | 0 | 0 |
| Portugal | 2024 | 5 | 1 |
| Portugal | 2025 | 1 | 0 |
| Portugal | 2026 | 4 | 0 |
| Total | | 21 | 2 |

As of match played 27 June 2026
Scores and results list Portugal's goal tally first, score column indicates score after each Nunes goal

List of international goals scored by Matheus Nunes
| No. | Date | Venue | Opponent | Score | Result | Competition |
|---|---|---|---|---|---|---|
| 1 | 24 March 2022 | Estádio do Dragão, Porto, Portugal | Turkey | 3–1 | 3–1 | 2022 FIFA World Cup qualification |
| 2 | 21 March 2024 | Estádio D. Afonso Henriques, Guimarães, Portugal | Sweden | 2–0 | 5–2 | Friendly |

== Honours ==
Sporting CP

- Primeira Liga: 2020–21
- Taça da Liga: 2020–21, 2021–22
- Supertaça Cândido de Oliveira: 2021

Manchester City

- Premier League: 2023–24
- FA Cup: 2025–26
- EFL Cup: 2025–26
- FA Community Shield: 2024
- FIFA Club World Cup: 2023

Individual

- Primeira Liga Midfielder of the Month: October/November 2021
- Primeira Liga Team of the Year: 2021–22
- Premier League Goal of the Month: April 2023
