= Ismael Sierra =

Spanish footballer (born 2003)

Personal information
- Full name: Ismael Sierra Arnal
- Date of birth: 17 March 2003 (age 23)
- Place of birth: Huesca, Spain
- Height: 1.92 m (6 ft 4 in)
- Position: Centre back

Team information
- Current team: Estoril
- Number: 15

Youth career
- Huesca
- 2019–2022: Betis
- 2020–2021: → Calavera (loan)

Senior career*
Years	Team	Apps	(Gls)
2022–2024	Betis B	21	(0)
2023–2024	→ Teruel (loan)	23	(1)
2024–	Estoril	7	(0)
2025	→ Osasuna B (loan)	17	(0)
2025	→ Osasuna (loan)	0	(0)
2025–2026	→ Villarreal B (loan)	26	(2)
2025–2026	→ Villarreal (loan)	0	(0)
- * Club domestic league appearances and goals as of 20:00, 13 October 2026 (UTC)

Ismael Sierra Arnal (born 17 March 2003) is a Spanish professional footballer who plays as a centre back for Portuguese club Estoril.

== Career ==
=== Early career ===
Born in Huesca, Sierra was a youth player at his hometown club SD Huesca. In 2020, he joined Real Betis, and in August 2022 his contract was extended to 2024. He began playing for the reserve team in the fourth-tier Segunda Federación in 2022–23 before being loaned to CD Teruel in his native Aragon and in the Primera Federación.

=== Estoril ===
On 14 August 2024, with one year remaining on his Betis contract, Sierra joined G.D. Estoril Praia in Portugal's Primeira Liga on a three-year deal, with the club buying 45% of his economic rights. Due to manager Ian Cathro preferring the central defensive partnership of Pedro Álvaro and Kévin Boma, his only appearance of the season was on 20 October in the third round of the Taça de Portugal, a penalty shootout loss to Lusitano Évora; he also played with the under-23 team in the Liga Revelação and scored on his debut in a 4–3 home win over S.L. Benfica, but added only two more appearances for that side.

Sierra returned to Spain on 14 January 2025, signing for CA Osasuna for the rest of the season and being assigned to the B-team in the third tier. He was an unused substitute on 30 March for the first team in La Liga, in a goalless draw away to rivals Athletic Bilbao.

On 31 July 2025, Sierra was loaned to Villarreal CF and again placed in its reserve team in the Primera Federación. The deal included the option to purchase, which Osasuna also had but did not execute. He was an unused substitute for the first team in the top flight on 23 September, a 2–1 win away to Sevilla FC; the B-team made the playoffs and were eliminated by Zamora CF.

After returning to Estoril, Sierra gained space in the team due to the departures of Boma and Felix Bacher. He made his debut in the top division on 7 August 2026 as the season began with a 1–1 draw at home to F.C. Famalicão. Under manager Vasco Matos, he played every second of the first seven matches of the season.
