= Litos (footballer, born 1967) =

Portuguese footballer

Personal information
- Full name: Luís Filipe Vieira Carvalha
- Date of birth: 6 January 1967 (age 59)
- Place of birth: São João da Madeira, Portugal
- Height: 1.74 m (5 ft 9 in)
- Position: Midfielder

Youth career
- 1980–1982: Sanjoanense
- 1982–1984: Sporting CP

Senior career*
Years	Team	Apps	(Gls)
1984–1992	Sporting CP	151	(11)
1992–1994	Boavista	14	(0)
1994–1995	Braga	12	(1)
1995–1996	Estoril	27	(2)
1996–1998	Lusitanos Saint-Maur		
1998–1999	Atlético	10	(0)
Total		214	(14)

International career
1984–1986	Portugal U21	5	(0)
1985	Portugal	2	(0)

Managerial career
- 2004–2007: Estoril
- 2009: Maxaquene
- 2009–2010: Portimonense
- 2011–2012: Leixões
- 2012–2015: Liga Desportiva
- 2016: Oriental
- 2018: Amora
- * Club domestic league appearances and goals

Luís Filipe Vieira Carvalha (born 6 January 1967), known as Litos, is a Portuguese former professional footballer who played as a midfielder. He was also a manager.

== Playing career ==
Litos was born in São João da Madeira, Aveiro District. As Sporting CP was coached by John Toshack, he made his first-team debut at the age of 17. His best individual season would be precisely his first – 28 matches, six goals, even reaching the Portugal national team– and he remained an important member of the main squad the following years.

Litos left the Lions in 1992, and represented, without much success at least in his country's Primeira Liga, Boavista FC, S.C. Braga, G.D. Estoril Praia, US Lusitanos Saint-Maur (third division, in France) and Atlético Clube de Portugal. He retired from the game in 1999, aged 32.

== Coaching career ==
Litos began working as a manager in 2004, starting with former club Estoril and not being able to prevent relegation from the top flight. In the 2009–10 campaign, he led Portimonense S.C. back to the same league after a two-decade absence.

Litos was fired by Portimonense in late December 2010, as the Algarve side ranked second-bottom. Shortly after, he signed for Leixões S.C. of the second tier, leaving the club on 14 February 2012.

Starting in 2012, Litos went on to spend several seasons in the Moçambola with Liga Desportiva de Maputo. In February 2016, he returned to his country and its second division, leaving Clube Oriental de Lisboa's bench after less than one month alleging personal reasons.
