= Grégory Arnolin =

Footballer (born 1980)

Grégory
Personal information
- Date of birth: 10 November 1980 (age 46)
- Place of birth: Livry-Gargan, France
- Height: 1.87 m (6 ft 2 in)
- Position: Centre-back

Youth career
- US Montfermeil
- 1997–1999: Paris Saint-Germain

Senior career*
| Years | Team | Apps | (Gls) |
| 1999–2001 | Paris Saint-Germain B | 21 | (0) |
| 1999–2000 | → Red Star (loan) | 14 | (0) |
| 2001–2002 | Villemomble | | |
| 2003–2004 | Pedras Rubras | 46 | (7) |
| 2004–2006 | Gil Vicente | 53 | (10) |
| 2006–2008 | Marítimo | 44 | (3) |
| 2008–2009 | Vitória Guimarães | 26 | (2) |
| 2009–2013 | Sporting Gijón | 93 | (3) |
| 2013 | Paços Ferreira | 6 | (0) |
| 2014 | Goa | 15 | (2) |
| 2014–2015 | Atlético | 24 | (1) |
| 2015–2016 | Goa | 24 | (1) |
| Total | | 366 | (29) |

International career
| 2013 | Martinique | 3 | (0) |
- * Club domestic league appearances and goals

Grégory Arnolin (born 10 November 1980), known simply as Grégory, is a former professional footballer who played as a central defender. Born in metropolitan France, he played for the Martinique national team.

== Club career ==
Arnolin was born in Livry-Gargan, Seine-Saint-Denis. At the age of 16 he signed a semi-professional contract with Paris Saint-Germain F.C. but, during his spell at the club, he never played for the first team.

In the summer of 2001, after a loan to Red Star FC, Arnolin's contract with PSG ran out and he became a free agent. He was quickly acquired by semi-professionals Villemomble Sports (also in Paris, competing in the fourth division) but, however, never appeared in a league match for the side, and in the summer of 2002 was released.

Arnolin then moved to Portugal, to play for F.C. Pedras Rubras in the third level. After solid performances he attracted attention from bigger clubs in the country, and eventually signed his first professional contract with Gil Vicente FC, in the Primeira Liga. In his second season he scored an impressive seven league goals for the Barcelos team, catching the eye of Madeira-based C.S. Marítimo and signing a two-year deal in late May 2006; after only missing one league game in his debut campaign, he played second-fiddle in the second (15 appearances).

On 12 June 2007, British sports channel Sky Sports reported that Arnolin was preparing to sign for West Bromwich Albion of the Football League Championship, after manager Tony Mowbray made it clear that the player was one of his summer transfer targets. The player's agent, former footballer Rudi Vata, said to the Birmingham Mail:

"There is a good possibility that Grégory will join West Bromwich but there are still issues to be resolved. We should know more at the end of this month when people are back from holiday and all focus switches towards pre-season. I think there is a big chance he will be a West Bromwich player next season. He is well aware of how close they were to playing in the Premiership and the club's ambitions match his own. What we don't know yet is whether it would be a transfer for about £400,000 or a loan move – that is one of the issues we have to discuss".

However, nothing came of it and Arnolin remained in Marítimo. On 7 June 2008, he signed for another Portuguese team, Vitória de Guimarães, as he was also applying for Portuguese citizenship – during his spell in the country, he began being addressed by his first name.

On 24 June 2009, Grégory moved to Sporting de Gijón, on a three-year link. In only his third game for the Asturians he netted through a header, as 10-men Sporting levelled 2–2 at Valencia CF with just four minutes to go.

Grégory's importance at the club became gradually less important, and he only appeared in 14 league games in 2012–13, in division two. On 24 August 2014, after brief spells in Portugal with F.C. Paços de Ferreira and Atlético Clube de Portugal, he was drafted by FC Goa to play in the inaugural edition of the Indian Super League; he retired at the age of 36, and later worked for Portuguese sports agency ProEleven.

== International career ==
In June 2013, aged nearly 33, Grégory was called up by Martinique for the 2013 CONCACAF Gold Cup. He made his debut in the tournament's opener, playing the full 90 minutes in a 1–0 win against Canada.

== Personal life ==
Arnolin's son, Jordan Arnolin is also a professional footballer.

== Career statistics ==
=== Club ===
Appearances and goals by club, season and competition
| Club | Season | League | | | Cup | | Continental | | Total | |
| Club | Season | Division | Apps | Goals | Apps | Goals | Apps | Goals | Apps | Goals |
|---|---|---|---|---|---|---|---|---|---|---|
| Pedras Rubras | 2002–03 | Segunda Divisão B | 15 | 0 | 0 | 0 | — | | 15 | 0 |
| Pedras Rubras | 2003–04 | Segunda Divisão B | 31 | 7 | 1 | 0 | — | | 32 | 7 |
| Pedras Rubras | Total | | 46 | 7 | 1 | 0 | — | | 47 | 7 |
| Gil Vicente | 2004–05 | Primeira Liga | 23 | 3 | 1 | 0 | — | | 24 | 3 |
| Gil Vicente | 2005–06 | Primeira Liga | 30 | 7 | 0 | 0 | — | | 30 | 7 |
| Gil Vicente | Total | | 53 | 10 | 1 | 0 | — | | 54 | 10 |
| Marítimo | 2006–07 | Primeira Liga | 29 | 2 | 1 | 0 | — | | 30 | 2 |
| Marítimo | 2007–08 | Primeira Liga | 15 | 1 | 1 | 0 | — | | 16 | 1 |
| Marítimo | Total | | 44 | 3 | 2 | 0 | — | | 46 | 3 |
| Vitória Guimarães | 2008–09 | Primeira Liga | 26 | 2 | 8 | 1 | 4 (Note: Appearances in UEFA Champions League and UEFA Cup) | 0 | 38 | 3 |
| Sporting Gijón | 2009–10 | La Liga | 35 | 2 | 0 | 0 | — | | 35 | 2 |
| Sporting Gijón | 2010–11 | La Liga | 23 | 1 | 1 | 0 | — | | 24 | 1 |
| Sporting Gijón | 2011–12 | La Liga | 21 | 0 | 0 | 0 | — | | 21 | 0 |
| Sporting Gijón | 2012–13 | Segunda División | 14 | 0 | 4 | 0 | — | | 18 | 0 |
| Sporting Gijón | Total | | 93 | 3 | 5 | 0 | — | | 98 | 3 |
| Paços Ferreira | 2013–14 | Primeira Liga | 6 | 0 | 1 | 0 | 2 (Note: Appearances in UEFA Champions League and UEFA Europa League) | 0 | 9 | 0 |
| Goa | 2014 | Indian Super League | 15 | 2 | — | | — | | 15 | 2 |
| Atlético | 2014–15 | Segunda Liga | 24 | 1 | 3 | 0 | — | | 27 | 1 |
| Goa | 2015 | Indian Super League | 4 | 0 | — | | — | | 4 | 0 |
| Career total | | | 311 | 28 | 21 | 0 | 6 | 0 | 338 | 28 |
