= G.D.U. Ericeirense =

Portuguese association football club

Ericeirense
- Full name: Grupo Desportivo União Ericeirense
- Nickname(s): GDUE; Guerreiros do Mar (Warriors of the sea)
- Founded: 1 December 1921; 103 years ago
- Ground: Campo Henrique Tomás Frade
- Capacity: 400
- Chairman: Mário Jorge Henrique Claro
- Manager: Ivo Café
- League: Lisbon FA 2nd Division
- 2020–21: Lisbon FA 1st Division, 14th of 20 (relegated)
- Website: http://www.gdue.pt/
Home colours	Away colours

Grupo Desportivo União Ericeirense is a Portuguese association football club, founded in Ericeira, a small parish within Mafra, on 1 December 1921. The club plays in the second division of the Lisbon Football Association league, holding their home matches at the Campo Henrique Tomás Frade.

== History ==
Founded on 1 December 1921 as Grémio União Ericeirense, the club changed name to Sociedade União Ericeirense in 1939. The current name was established in 1941, after the merger of SU Ericeirense and Grupo Desportivo Ericeirense.

Ericeirense reached the top tier of the Lisbon Football Association in the 1960–61 season, also playing in the Terceira Divisão during that season. It was the only season that the club featured in a national league, aside from two participations in the Taça de Portugal (2004–05 and 2020–21).

In the 2015–16 and 2016–17 seasons, Ericeirense had Portuguese international footballer Matheus Nunes in their squad.

== Notable players ==
- (Angola) Inácio Miguel (youth)
- (Portugal) Filipe Ramos (youth)
- (Portugal) Matheus Nunes
- (Portugal) Pedro Bonifácio (youth)
- (Colombia) Bryan Zuluaga

== Notable managers ==
- (Portugal) Luís Freire
