= Kévin Boma =

Togolese footballer (born 2002)

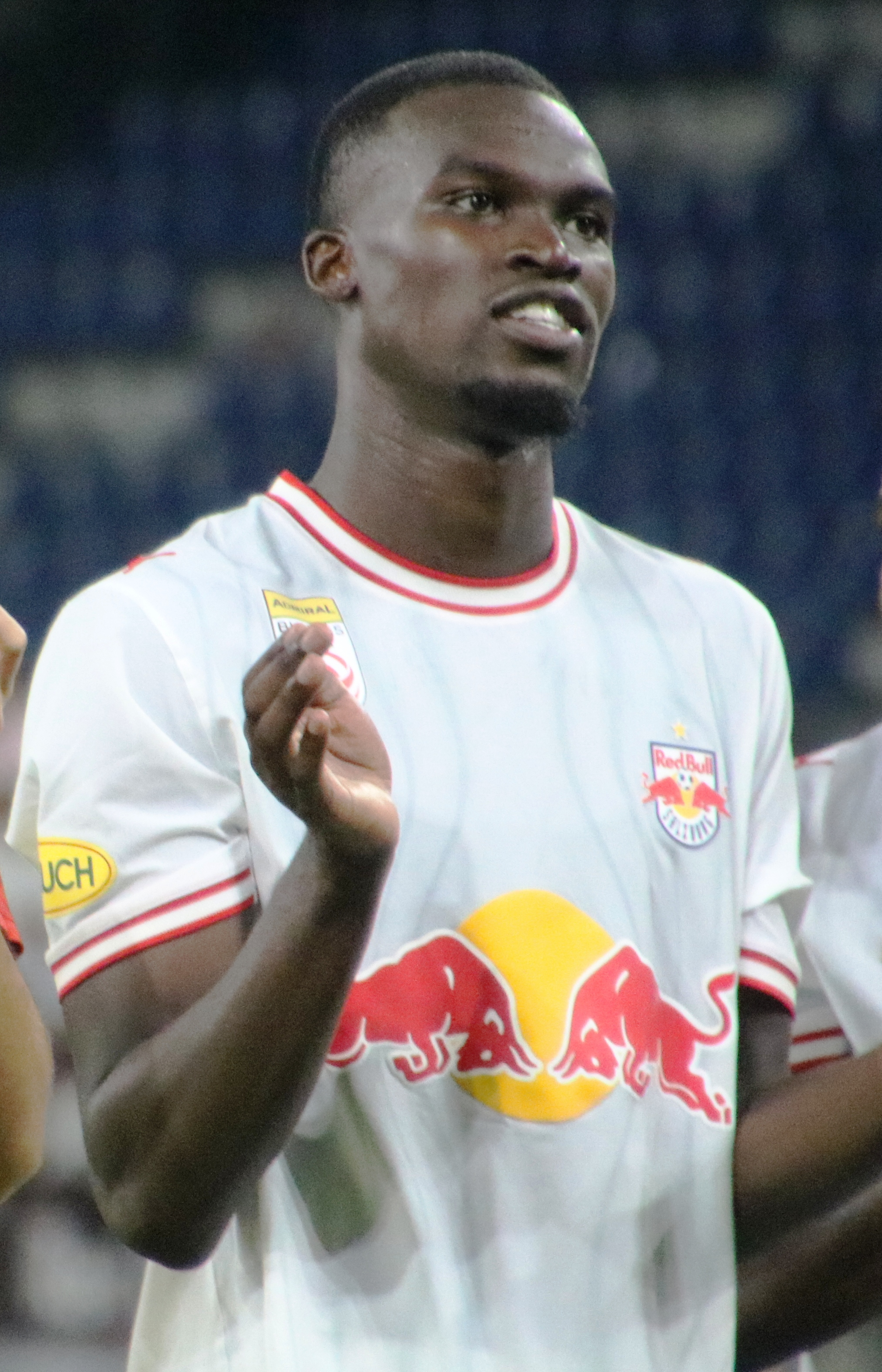
- Kevin Boma in 2026

Personal information
- Date of birth: 20 November 2002 (age 23)
- Place of birth: Poitiers, France
- Height: 1.87 m (6 ft 2 in)
- Position: Centre-back

Team information
- Current team: Red Bull Salzburg
- Number: 44

Youth career
- 2009–2012: Trois Cités Poitiers
- 2012–2017: Stade Poitevin
- 2017–2018: Guingamp

Senior career*
Years	Team	Apps	(Gls)
2019	Tours II	2	(0)
2019–2022	Angers II	37	(2)
2021–2022	Angers	0	(0)
2022–2024	Rodez	20	(1)
2024–2026	Estoril	50	(2)
2026–	Red Bull Salzburg	9	(1)

International career^{‡}
2020	France U18	1	(0)
2022	Togo U23	1	(0)
2024–	Togo	12	(0)
- * Club domestic league appearances and goals as of 25 October 2026 ‡ National team caps and goals as of 22:14, 29 September 2026 (UTC)

Kévin Boma (born 20 November 2002) is a professional footballer who plays as a centre-back for Austrian Bundesliga club Red Bull Salzburg. Born in France, he represents the Togo national team.

== Club career ==
=== Early years ===
Boma was born in Poitiers, Nouvelle-Aquitaine, and progressed through the youth teams of local Trois Cités Poitiers and Stade Poitevin before joining the Guingamp academy at age 14.

He signed with the reserve team of Tours after a successful trial in January 2019. He made his senior debut for the team on 18 May 2019 in a Championnat National 3 match against Montargis.

=== Angers ===
Boma signed with Angers in 2019, initially becoming a part of the reserves.

On 7 March 2021, Boma made his professional debut for Angers in the Coupe de France, coming on as a substitute in the 78th minute for Ibrahim Amadou as his team knocked out Club Franciscain with a 5–0 win.

=== Rodez ===
On 9 August 2022, Boma signed a three-year contract with Rodez.

=== Estoril ===
On 2 July 2024, Boma moved to Estoril in Portugal on a four-year contract.

=== Red Bull Salzburg ===
On 23 June 2026, Boma moved to Austrian club Salzburg.

== International career ==
On 24 March 2022, Boma made his international debut for Togo U23. It resulted in a 1–0 win over the Tajikistan U23. In June 2024, he was called up to the senior Togo national team.

== Career statistics ==
=== Club ===
As of match played 25 October 2026

Appearances and goals by club, season and competition
Club	Season	League			National cup (Note: Includes Coupe de France, Taça de Portugal)		Europe		Other		Total	
Club	Season	Division	Apps	Goals	Apps	Goals	Apps	Goals	Apps	Goals	Apps	Goals
Tours II	2018–19	CFA 2	2	0	—		—		—		2	0
Angers II	2019–20	CFA	9	0	—		—		—		9	0
Angers II	2020–21	CFA	5	0	—		—		—		5	0
Angers II	2021–22	CFA	23	2	—		—		—		23	2
Angers II	Total		37	2	—		—		—		37	2
Angers	2020–21	Ligue 1	0	0	1	0	—		—		1	0
Rodez II	2022–23	CFA 2	4	1	—		—		—		4	1
Rodez	2022–23	Ligue 2	5	0	4	0	—		—		9	0
Rodez	2023–24	Ligue 2	15	1	2	0	—		0	0	17	1
Rodez	Total		20	1	6	0	—		0	0	26	1
Estoril	2024–25	Primeira Liga	29	1	1	0	—		—		30	1
Estoril	2025–26	Primeira Liga	21	1	2	0	—		—		23	1
Estoril	Total		50	2	3	0	—		—		53	2
Red Bull Salzburg	2026–27	Austrian Bundesliga	9	1	1	0	7 (Note: Appearances in UEFA Europa League)	0	—		17	1
Career total			120	7	11	0	7	0	0	0	139	7

=== International ===
As of match played 29 September 2026

Appearances and goals by national team and year
National team	Year	Apps	Goals
Togo	2024	4	0
Togo	2025	6	0
Togo	2026	2	0
Total		12	0
