= Filipe Ramos =

Portuguese football manager and former player

Filipe
Personal information
- Full name: Filipe Manuel Esteves Ramos
- Date of birth: 21 April 1970 (age 56)
- Place of birth: Luanda, Angola
- Height: 1.71 m (5 ft 7 1/2 in)
- Position: Midfielder

Team information
- Current team: Portugal (youth)

Youth career
- 1984–1985: Ericeirense
- 1985–1987: Torreense

Senior career*
Years	Team	Apps	(Gls)
1987–1989	Torreense	38	(2)
1989–1996	Sporting CP	119	(2)
1996–1997	Marítimo	19	(0)
1997–1998	Vitória Guimarães	4	(0)
1998–1999	Chaves	20	(1)
1999–2000	Naval	4	(0)
2000–2001	Atlético	32	(0)
2002–2005	Mafra	54	(0)
Total		290	(5)

International career
1989	Portugal U20	5	(0)
1990–1992	Portugal U21	14	(2)
1992	Portugal	3	(0)

Managerial career
- 2005–2009: Mafra
- 2009–2010: Real Massamá
- 2010–: Portugal (youth)
Medal record
Men's football
Representing Portugal
FIFA U-20 World Cup
Winner	1989 Saudi Arabia
- * Club domestic league appearances and goals

Filipe Manuel Esteves Ramos CvIH (born 21 April 1970), known simply as Filipe, is a Portuguese former professional footballer who played as a midfielder. He is currently a manager.

== Honours ==
Sporting CP

- Taça de Portugal: 1994–95

Portugal

- FIFA U-20 World Cup: 1989
