= Jordan Arnolin =

Portuguese footballer (born 2008)

Personal information
- Full name: Jordan Miguel Silva Arnolin
- Date of birth: 29 April 2008 (age 18)
- Place of birth: Lisbon, Portugal
- Height: 1.83 m (6 ft 0 in)
- Positions: Centre-back; defensive midfielder; fullback

Team information
- Current team: Estoril
- Number: 42

Youth career
- Sintrense
- 2020–2025: Estoril

Senior career*
Years	Team	Apps	(Gls)
2025–	Estoril	5	(0)

International career^{‡}
2026	Portugal U18	5	(0)
2026–	Portugal U19	5	(1)
- * Club domestic league appearances and goals as of 6 November 2026 ‡ National team caps and goals as of 6 November 2026

Jordan Miguel Silva Arnolin (born 29 April 2008) is a Portuguese professional footballer who plays as a midfielder or centre-back for Estoril.

== Club career ==
Born in Lisbon, Arnolin is the son of Martinique international Grégory Arnolin, who made most of his career in the Portuguese first tier.

Arnolin is a youth product of Sintrense and Estoril Praia, where he started playing with the under-23 team in March 2025, and with whom he became a regular by the 2025–26 season.

In July 2026, he signed his first professional contract with Estoril.

Arnolin made his professional debut with Estoril on 22 August 2026, replacing midfielder Antef Tsoungui in the last 15 minutes of a 2–0 Primeira Liga home loss to Rio Ave.

On 31 October 2026, he made his first start for the team, during a 4–0 loss to FC Porto. Playing as a defensive midfielder, and impressing despite the collective struggle, this game confirmed his growing importance with the first team, where despite not playing in his natural centre-back position he already attracted reported scouts from teams like Barcelona, Lille and Brighton.

== International career ==
Born in Portugal, Arnolin is also eligible for France and Martinique through his father. He is a youth international for Portugal, having played for the under-18 and under-19. By the autumn 2026, he had become a key piece with the youth teams from the 2008 generation that had just won the under-17 European and World trophies in 2025.

== Style of play ==
Arnolin raose though the youth ranks of Estoril Praia as a centre-back, but his first team breakthrough was as a defensive midfielder, while he is also able to play as a fullback.
