= Fort of Milreu =

17th Century fortress in Portugal

- Forte de São Pedro de Milreu
- Lisbon District, Near Ericeira in Portugal
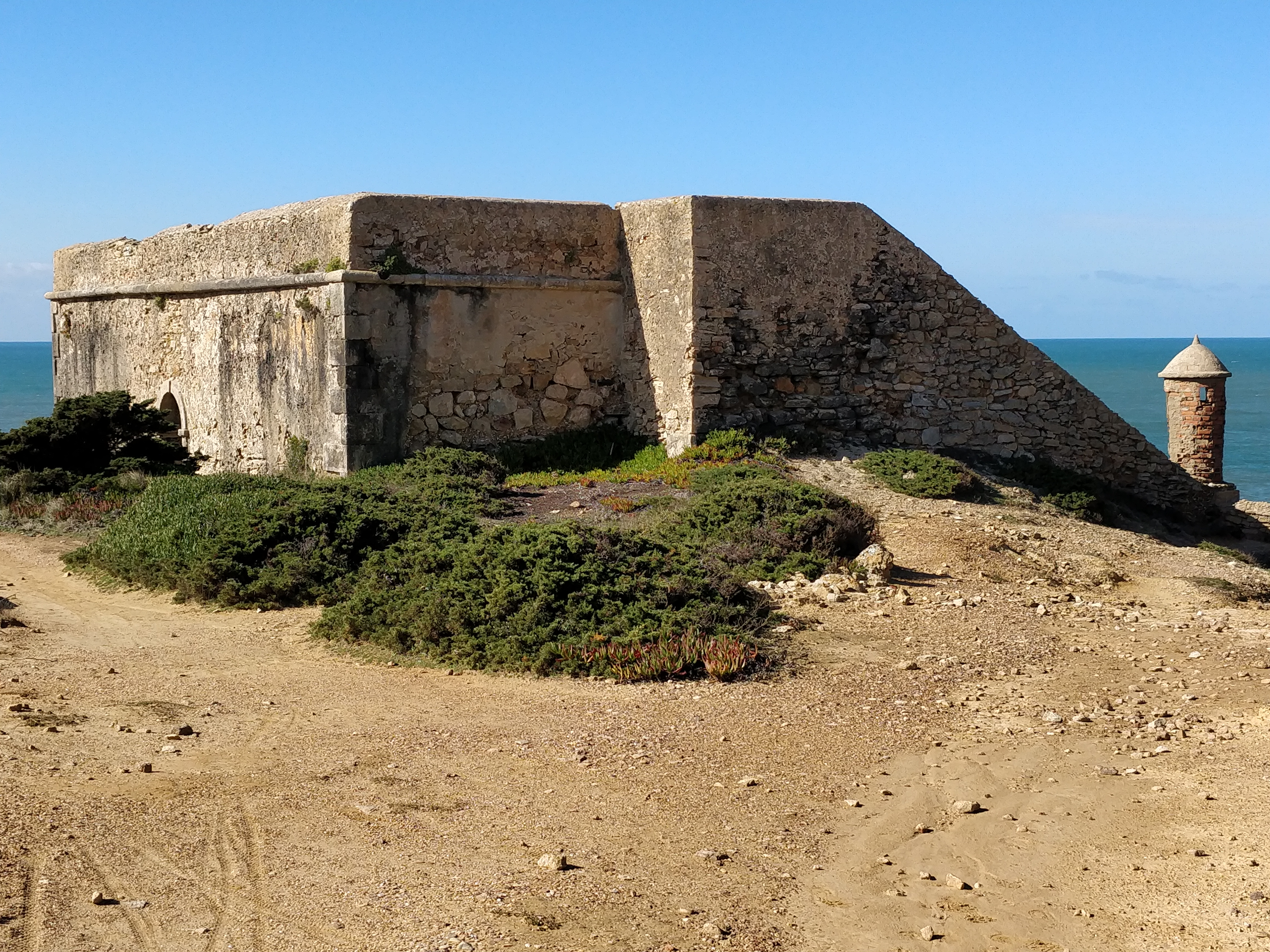
- View of the Milreu fort

Site information
- Type: Fort
- Owner: Portuguese Republic
- Operator: Unoccupied
- Open to the public: Yes

Location
- Coordinates: 38°59′01″N 9°25′14″W

Site history
- Built: 1670-75
- Materials: Limestone masonry
- Fate: Degraded

The Fort of Milreu, also known as the Fort of St. Peter of Milreu (Portuguese: Forte de São Pedro de Milreu), is situated on the Atlantic coast 3km north of the town of Ericeira in Lisbon District of Portugal. Part of a programme to extend Portugal's coastal defences, it was built between 1670 and 1675.

== History ==
The Fort of Milreu, was built after the Portuguese Restoration War between Portugal and Spain. Lessons learned from this war, which ended with the Treaty of Lisbon (1668), convinced the Portuguese of the need to reorganise their coastal defences by building numerous fortresses and forts along the entire coastline of the country. The choice of Milreu as a location to erect a fort was because this was the ideal place to both defend against maritime access to Ericeira from the north and protect against landings on the Beach of Ribeira de Ilhas, immediately to the north of the fort.

By 1680 the fort was already garrisoned, supplied with artillery and in full operation. Rectangular in shape and in a Mannerist style, it consisted of a battery with cannons, two circular bartizans with a conical cover, three barracks and a guardhouse. A side staircase, led to a terrace protected by a parapet. However, by 1751 it was reported to be in a poor condition as a result of a harsh winter and this was aggravated by the earthquake on 1 November 1755. By 1796 the garrison consisted of 7 soldiers and 5 gunners, and the artillery one bronze cannon and five iron cannon. The fort was abandoned in 1806 and by 1821 it was reported to be in an advanced state of ruin. Significant repairs were made in 1831-32 during the Portuguese Civil War and in 1832 it was garrisoned by Miguelist forces and artillery. However, by 1853 it was again abandoned and in a degraded state.

In 1871, parts of the fort were used in the rebuilding of the Church of São Pedro da Ericeira. With no remaining military function its bronze cannon were sent to Lisbon in 1880 and it was occupied by the Portuguese Fiscal Guard in 1891. Some repair work was carried out between 1908 and 1910 but this ceased with the dissolution of the monarchy in 1910. In 1940, work finally began to restore the fort but the following year it officially ceased to be considered a military fortification and responsibility for its management was handed over to the Ministry of Finance. Between 1946 and 1992 there were many ideas for the use of the building, such as a café or restaurant, but none materialised. The Fort of Milreu was classified as a Property of Public Interest in 1977 and the Directorate General of National Buildings and Monuments (DGEMN) rebuilt the wall and made other repairs in 1984 and in 2001. Nevertheless in 2019 it remained in a degraded condition.
