= Fabrício Garcia =

Cape Verdean footballer (born 2001)

Personal information
- Full name: Fabrício Garcia Andrade
- Date of birth: 4 May 2001 (age 25)
- Place of birth: Praia, Cape Verde
- Height: 1.72 m (5 ft 8 in)
- Position: Winger

Team information
- Current team: Estoril

Youth career
- AD Bairro

Senior career*
Years	Team	Apps	(Gls)
2020–2021	AD Bairro		
2021–2023	Fabril	36	(14)
2023–	Estoril	41	(2)
2026	→ Alverca (loan)	6	(1)

International career^{‡}
2024–	Cape Verde	6	(0)
- * Club domestic league appearances and goals as of 25 May 2026 ‡ National team caps and goals as of 17:28, 27 January 2026 (UTC)

Fabrício Garcia Andrade (Portuguese: [fɐ.ˈbɾi.si.u ɡɐɾ.ˈsi.ɐ ɐ̃.ˈdɾa.dɨ]; born 4 May 2001) is a Cape Verdean professional footballer who plays as a winger for Primeira Liga club Estoril and the Cape Verde national team.

== Career ==
Garcia began his career with the Cape Verdean club AD Bairro in 2020. In 2021, he moved to Portugal with Fabril. On 4 August 2023, Garcia joined the Primeira Liga club Estoril, and was originally assigned to their U23s. On 8 April 2024, he extended his contract with the first team of Estoril with until 2028.

On 27 January 2026, Garcia joined fellow Primeira Liga club Alverca on loan until the end of the 2025–26 season.

== International career ==
Garcia was called up to the Cape Verde national team for a set of 2026 FIFA World Cup qualification matches in June 2024.
