= Luís Freire =

Portuguese footballer and manager

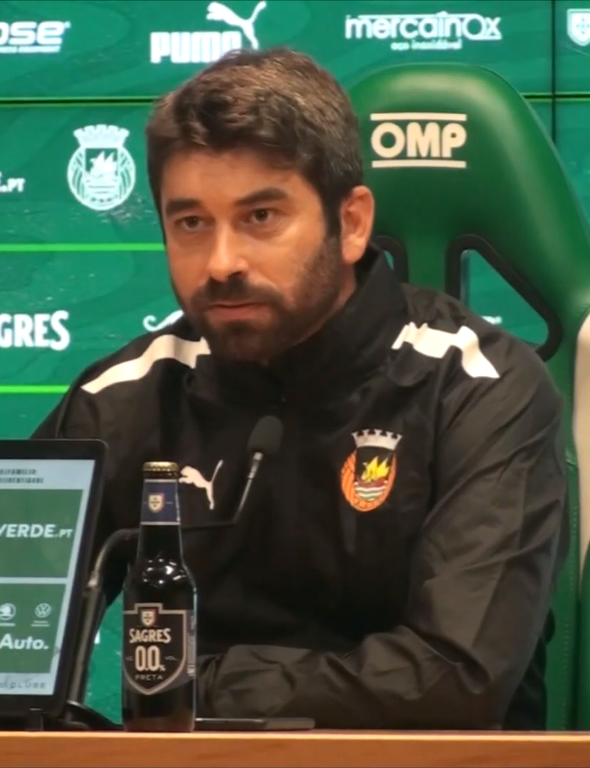
- Freire as manager of Rio Ave in 2022

Personal information
- Full name: Luís Carlos Batalha Freire
- Date of birth: 3 November 1985 (age 41)
- Place of birth: Ericeira, Portugal

Team information
- Current team: Portugal U21 (manager)

Managerial career
- Years: Team
- 2012–2015: Ericeirense
- 2015–2017: Pêro Pinheiro
- 2017–2018: Mafra
- 2018–2019: Estoril Praia
- 2019–2021: Nacional
- 2021–2024: Rio Ave
- 2025: Vitória de Guimarães
- 2025–: Portugal U21

Luís Carlos Batalha Freire (born 3 November 1985) is a Portuguese professional football manager who is currently in charge of the Portugal national under-21 team.

Beginning as a manager in amateur football in his 20s, he won six promotions in his first eight seasons, including as champions of the Campeonato de Portugal with Mafra in 2018. In 2020, he reached the Primeira Liga with Nacional, and did the same with Rio Ave two years later as champions of Liga Portugal 2, as well as leading Vitória de Guimarães in the top flight in 2025.

== Managerial career ==
=== Early career ===
Freire was born in Ericeira, Mafra, Lisbon District. He played as a defender in the youth academy of G.D.U. Ericeirense and C.D. Mafra, but quit football when he began studying at the University of Évora in 2005. While studying, Freire started training local athletes at Juventude Sport Clube. To gain visibility, he started scouting at Mafra, C.D. Tondela, and then Clube Oriental de Lisboa, taking on assistant duties as well. Freire returned to university to study his Master's degree and started training his local side Ericeirense, as well as teaching on the side. When he received an offer to scout at S.C. Covilhã, Ericeirense offered him a managerial position for the first time in his career. He managed to achieve promotion, and joined C.A. Pêro Pinheiro where he was promoted again.

Freire's record of four promotions in his first five seasons of senior management earned him the nicknames of "The Poor Man's Vítor Oliveira" (after a specialist in promotion to Primeira Liga) and "The Mourinho of Promotions". In 2017, he managed for the first time in the third-tier Campeonato de Portugal, winning promotion as champions with Mafra with a 2–1 final win over S.C. Farense on 10 June 2018.

=== Estoril ===
The day after getting Mafra into LigaPro, Freire left for G.D. Estoril Praia of that league, with the aim of reaching the top flight. On 29 July 2018, in his first match in professional football, his side beat Farense 2–0 away to reach the group stage of the Taça da Liga; on his league debut on 11 August the team won 4–0 at home to FC Porto B. He left on 21 January 2019 after a run of three losses and a draw.

=== Nacional ===
On 27 May 2019, Freire signed a one-year deal with C.D. Nacional, recently relegated to the second tier. The team were in first place when the season was abandoned prematurely due to the COVID-19 pandemic, meaning Freire had a record of 6 promotions in his first 8 seasons as a manager. In 2020–21, 34-year-old Freire was the youngest manager in that season of the Primeira Liga.

Freire made his top-flight debut on 20 September in a 3–3 home draw with Boavista FC. He left the club on 21 March 2021 after six consecutive defeats left them one point above the relegation zone.

=== Rio Ave ===
Freire returned to work on 29 June 2021, signing for newly relegated Rio Ave F.C. on a one-year deal. In his first season, he helped them bounce back as champions.

In June 2022, Freire signed for two more years with the club from Vila do Conde. On 28 August, his team won 3–1 at home to reigning champions FC Porto for a first league victory, though on 16 October they were knocked out of the third round of the Taça de Portugal 3–2 at third-tier F.C. Oliveira do Hospital.

Freire extended his contract with Rio Ave until 2025 in June 2023, but on 25 December, sporting director Nuno de Almeida announced that Freire would leave the club at the end of the 2023–24 season. He would still remain in charge of the club ahead of the 2024–25 campaign, but was sacked on 5 November, with the club 14th after 10 games.

=== Vitoria Guimarães ===
Freire signed for Vitória de Guimarães on 15 January 2025, on an 18-month deal. He was their third manager of the season, after Rui Borges and Daniel Sousa. In March, his team were eliminated 6–2 on aggregate by Spain's Real Betis in the last 16 of the UEFA Conference League. Having finished the domestic league season in sixth and missed out on a return to European competition, he left the Estádio D. Afonso Henriques in May.

=== Portugal under-21 ===
On 16 July 2025, Freire was appointed manager of the Portugal national under-21 team. He succeeded Rui Jorge, who had held the role for nearly 15 years. His debut was the biggest win for a new manager of the team, a 5–0 victory over Azerbaijan on 5 September in 2027 UEFA European Under-21 Championship qualification.

== Managerial statistics ==
As of 18 November 2025

Managerial record by team and tenure
Team	From	To	Record							
Team	From	To	G	W	D	L	GF	GA	GD	Win %
Ericeirense	1 July 2012	30 June 2015	94	48	16	30	145	108	+37	51.06
Pêro Pinheiro	1 July 2015	23 May 2017	65	43	15	7	116	40	+76	66.15
Mafra	23 May 2017	11 June 2018	40	27	9	4	76	29	+47	67.50
Estoril Praia	11 June 2018	21 January 2019	24	13	4	7	36	23	+13	54.17
Nacional	27 May 2019	21 March 2021	53	21	15	17	68	61	+7	39.62
Rio Ave	29 June 2021	5 November 2024	129	47	42	40	160	156	+4	36.43
Vitória de Guimarães	15 January 2025	20 May 2025	19	8	6	5	23	21	+2	42.11
Portugal U21	16 July 2025	Present	5	4	1	0	21	0	+21	80.00
Career totals			429	211	108	110	645	438	+207	49.18

== Honours ==
Mafra

- Campeonato de Portugal: 2017–18

Rio Ave

- Liga Portugal 2: 2021–22
