= Ericeira =

- Civil parish
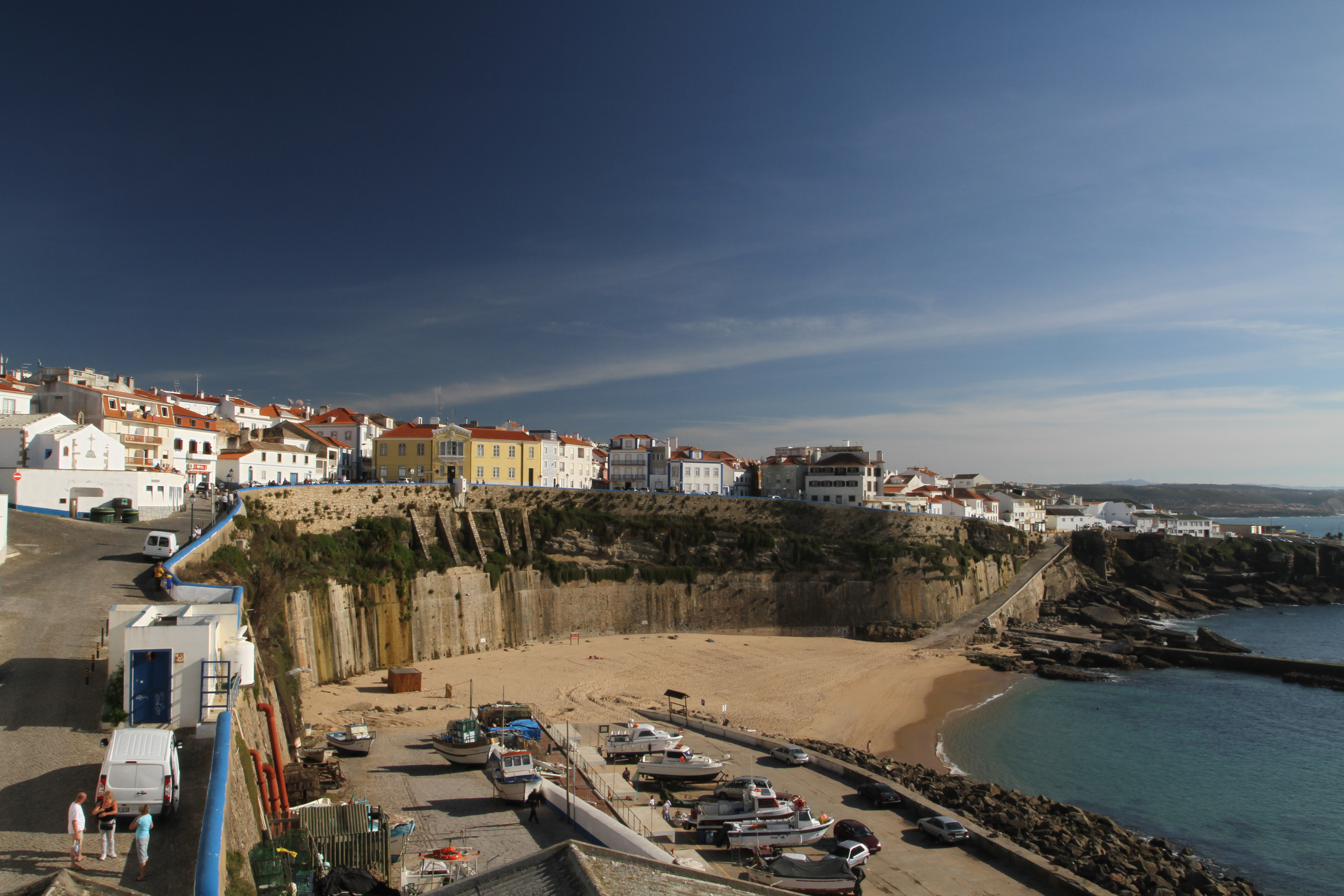
- The coastal view of the skyline of Ericeira

- Location in Portugal
- Coordinates: 38.962°N 9.418°W
- Country: Portugal
- Region: Lisbon
- Metropolitan area: Lisbon
- District: Lisbon
- Municipality: Mafra

Area
  - Total: 12 km^{2} (4.6 sq mi)

Population (2011)
  - Total: 10,260
  - Density: 860/km^{2} (2,200/sq mi)
- Time zone: UTC+00:00 (WET)
  - Summer (DST): UTC+01:00 (WEST)
- Postal code: 2655
- Area code: 261

Ericeira (Portuguese pronunciation: [eɾiˈsɐjɾɐ]) is a civil parish and seaside community on the western coast of Portugal (in Mafra municipality, located 35km northwest of the center of Lisbon, about 45km by road) considered the surfing capital of Europe. It is also one of only two European spots among the World Surfing Reserves because of its exceptional coastline conditions. Ericeira's population in 2011 was estimated in 10,260, covering an area of 12 km^{2}.

Ericeira was a popular summer retreat for many of Lisbon's families in the 1940s and 1950s. Today, it is a popular destination for local and visiting tourists, as well as surfers from around the world (owing to the forty beaches with good conditions in the area).

== History ==
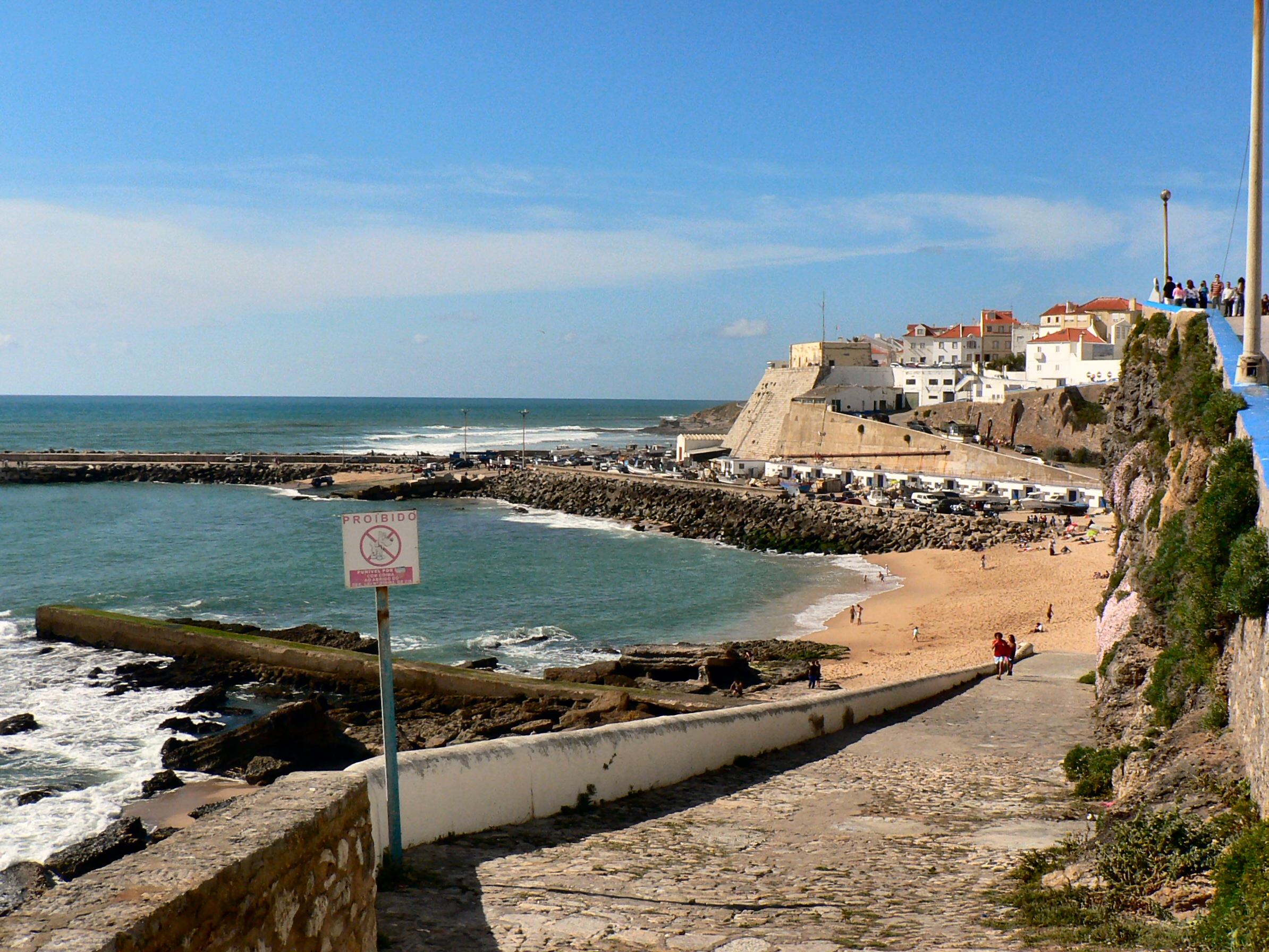
The Praia dos Pescadores (Fisherman's Beach), location of the departure of King Manuel II after the 5 October 1910 revolution

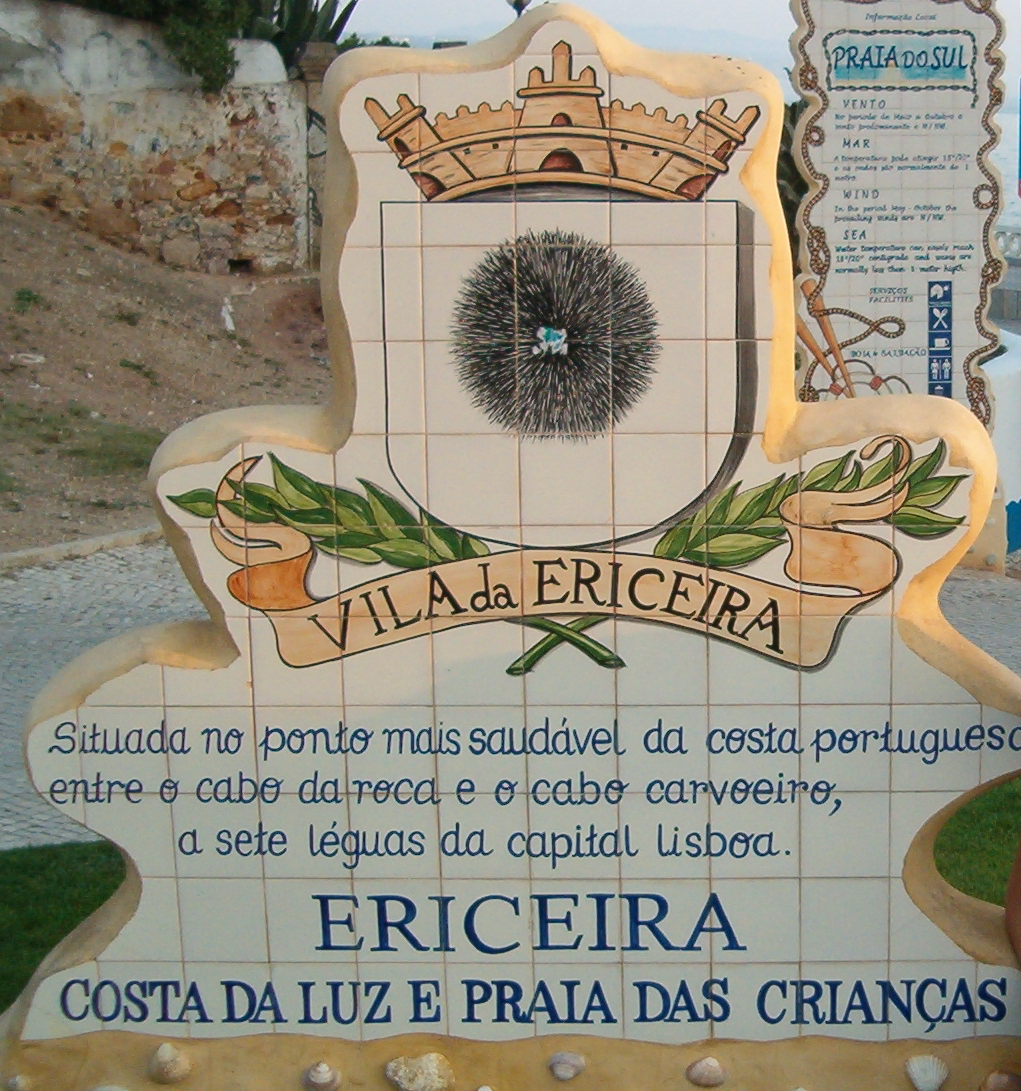
A azulejo plaque on the entrance to Ericeria

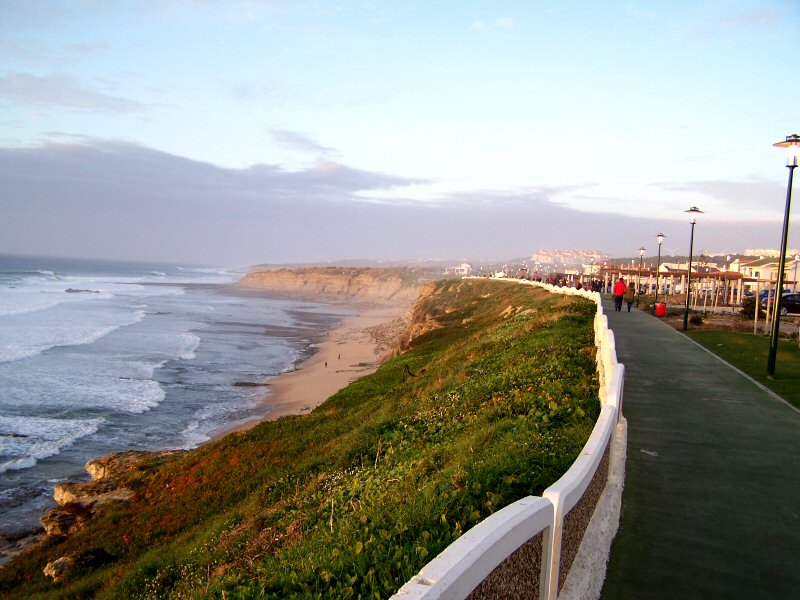
The beach of Praia de São Sebastião

The region's taxonomic name has a convoluted history. Ericeira is believed to have originated from Ouriceira, itself a derivative of Ouriço, referring to the name for sea urchins (used in the parish's coat-of-arms). One legend suggested that Ericeira was the terra de ouriços (land of ouriços), owing to what was assumed to be an abundance of sea-urchins along the beaches. However, recent investigations, archived in the Museum of the Misericórdia, confirm that the animal mentioned was not an "ouriço", but an "ouriço-caixeiro" (hedgehog), a species associated with the Phoenician goddess Astarte. The ancient settlement presumably dates from the passage and colonization of the Phoenicians.

The region's first foral (charter) dates to 1229, when it was issued by friar D. Fernão Rodrigues Monteiro, Master of the Cavalry and the Military Order of São Bento de Avis, which was later reformed by King Manuel, in 1513.

After the disappearance of King Sebastian of Portugal, during the Battle of Alcácer Quibir, there arose several pretenders to the throne. One of these was the King of Ericeira, a young hermit based in the Chapel of São Julião, south of the village of Ericeira, who passed himself off as Dom Sebastian. He crowned a Queen, distributed handouts and punished his detractors, conceding several noble titles. In the end, he was taken to the guillotine, and his supporters too ended-up on the gallows.

Ericeira was an area much frequented for its climatic and seaside comforts. In fact, Charles Lepierre, a chemical engineer referred to Ericeira's beaches as "a focus of the major concentration of iodine in all of the northern Portuguese coast". In 1803, the Bishop of Coimbra took regular baths in Ericeira, and the Royal Family including Queen Maria Pia of Savoy in 1864 also frequented its waters. At the end of the 19th century, beginning of the 20th century, many of Lisbon's local aristocracy began to build homes in the parish, including the Burnays, Ulriches and Rivottis.

The development of the commercial port made Ericeira a fundamental pole of the region's economy. Reports dating from 1834 noted the anchoring of 175 boats transporting products to the village, principally cereals (which were then distributed into the interior) while exports, especially wines and spirits, were sent to the Algarve, the islands and other locations. The customshouse in Ericeira supported an area extending from Cascais to Figueira da Foz, and the port was the fourth most important in the country, after Lisbon, Porto and Setúbal. With the construction of the western railway and the development of land transport, the port of Ericeira lost much of its importance. At the end of the 19th century, several warehouses and supply shops for sardine fishers were built, employing 500 men but altering the old fishing characteristics of the site. Ericeira's golden age of prosperity during the 19th century, when the port was the busiest in Estremadura.

During the Second World War, the region became a refuge for several foreign communities, including pockets of Poles, Germans, French, Belgians and Dutch expatriates fleeing Nazi persecution in their homelands.

Ericeira is more famously known for the day that King Manuel II of Portugal went into exile, from the Praia dos Pescadores, after the outbreak of the 5 October 1910 revolution. It was about 3:00 in the afternoon of 5 October 1910, when the 20-year-old monarch, accompanied by Queen Amélie of Orleans and Queen Mother Maria Pia, arrived from Mafra. Arriving by car, escaping from the recent Republican revolution in Lisbon, the king was bound for the royal yacht D. Amélia offshore. The details were later immortalized in 1928 by Júlio Ivo, then president of the municipal council of Mafra (during the presidency of Sidónio Pais, who explained: "...the automobiles stopped and the Royal Family got out, they followed the Rua do Norte to the Rua de Baixo, to the narrow lane that connects the two roads, almost in front of the Travessa da Estrela...On arrival at the Rua de Baixo, the Royal Family went in the following order: at the front, King Manuel; followed by Maria Pia, then Amélia... the King...climbed aboard the boat using crates and baskets of fish...the flagman signalled with his hat, and the first boat, the Bomfim, carrying the blue and white flag on the stern, followed by the rowers, taking the King...the crowds along the coast were immense. Everyone silent, but many with tears running from their eyes...The King was very pallid, Amélia animated, Maria Pia was overwhelmed...The boats had hardly come alongside the yacht when in the village there appeared, coming from Sintra, an automobile with civil revolutionaries, armed with carbines and bearing bombs, which they later indicated they were prepared to throw at the beach if they had reached it at the time of the departure...".

Its location, near Lisbon, and the development of the roadway network permitted, after the 1950s, a greater migration of summer sun-seekers, which helped to modify the character of the area. Initially a commercial fishing port, Ericeira was transformed into an urban agglomeration dependent on seasonal tourism. The devotion to the Blessed Virgin Mary under her title of Our Lady of Good Voyage began in Ericeira.

== Geography ==
Along its northern border is Coxos Break point, known as one of the best professional surfing areas in Europe, and not an area for beginners. The parish consists of the settlements Bairro Arsénio Amadeu, Calçadinha Preta, Ericeira, Fonte Boa, Fonte Boa dos Nabos, Lapa da Serra, Pinhal de Frades and Seixal.

== Economy ==
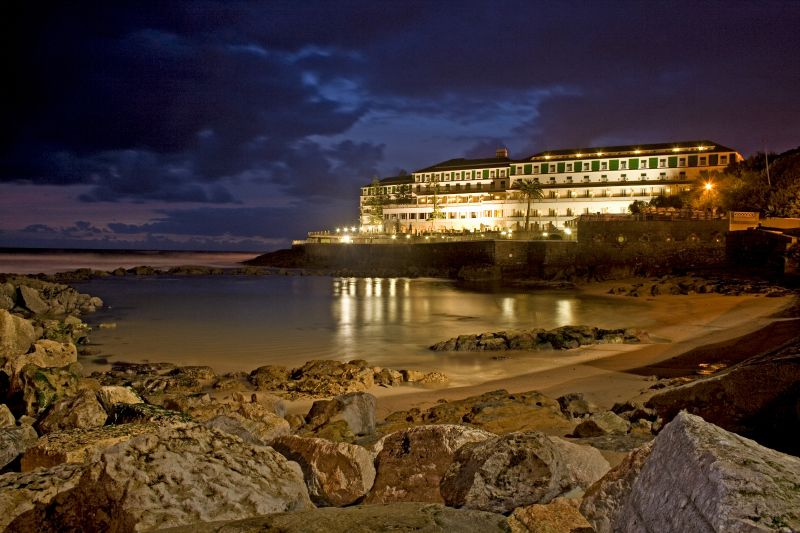
Ericeira Hotel

Ericeira is a seaside town surrounded by many beaches and many surf spots recognized in Europe and the world as world class. Tourism-related businesses ranging from foodservice to hospitality, as well as commerce and fishing, are the main activities in the town.

Ericeira is the home to Portugal's first/largest surfing association/club, the Ericeira Surf Clube. Founded in 1993, it developed from the surfing unit of the Ericeira Naval Club, which organized local, regional and national competitions in surf, bodyboard, kneeboard and longboard throughout the years. In addition, the Surf Club began a school to train local athletes and visiting tourists who wanted to learn how to surf.

In the 2020s especially after the global pandemic, the town has become popular with internationally mobile freelancers - so called digital nomads - who are increasingly engaging with the local population, with co-working spaces, online community groups and meetups such as Open Coffee Ericeira becoming increasingly popular.

== Architecture ==
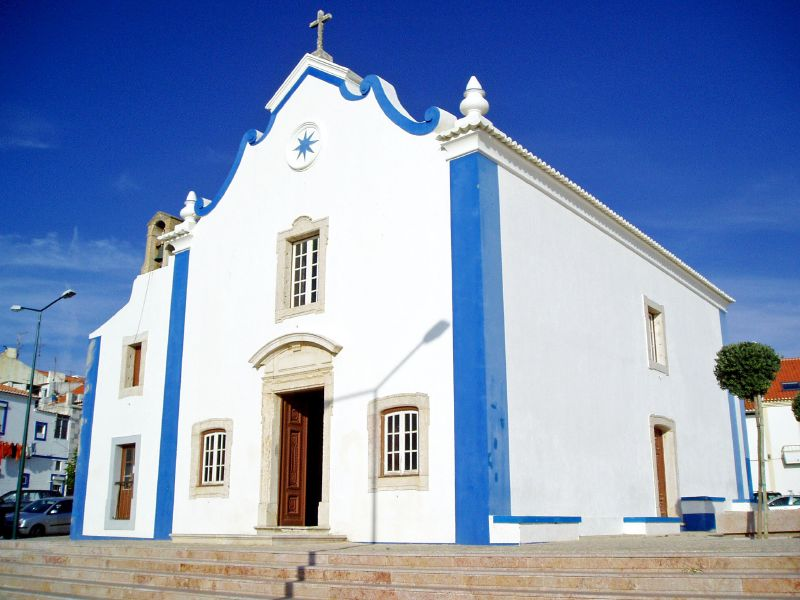
The late 15th century Chapel of Santa Marta Ericeira

=== Civic ===
- Café Arcada (Portuguese: Edifício na Praça da República/Café Arcadas/Sede da Junta de Turismo)
- Casa da Avó Lúcia
- Ericeira Casino (Portuguese: Casino da Ericeira/Auditório Jaime Lobo)
- Estate of the Leitões (Portuguese: Quinta dos Leitões/Casal do Morgado dos Leitões)
- Estate of Serrão Francão (Portuguese: Quinta de Serrão Franco)
- Fountain of Cabo (Portuguese: Fonte do Cabo)
- Fountain of Dolphins (Portuguese: Fonte dos Golfinhos)
- Fountain of São Pedro (Portuguese: Fonte de Milreu/Fonte de São Pedro)
- Fountain of Triton (Portuguese: Fonte do Casino/Fonte do Tritão)
- Park of Santa Marta (Portuguese: Parque de Santa Marta)
- Pillory of Ericeira (Portuguese: Pelourinho de Ericeira)
- Hospital of the Misericórdia (Portuguese: Hospital da Santa Casa da Misericórdia da Ericeira)
- Postal, Telegraph and Telephone (CTT) of Ericeira (Portuguese: Edifício dos Correios, Telégrafos e Telefones, CTT, da Ericeira)
- Primary School of Ericeira (Portuguese: Escola Primária da Ericeira/Escola Básica do 1.º Ciclo e Jardim de Infância da Ericeira)

=== Military ===
- Fort of Milreu (Portuguese: Zona Envolvente do Forte de Milreu)
- Fort of Nossa Senhora da Piedade (Portuguese: Forte de Nossa Senhora da Piedade/Forte de Nossa Senhora da Natividade/Posto da Guarda Fiscal, GF, da Ericeira)

=== Religious ===
- Chapel of Santa Mara (Portuguese: Capela de Santa Marta)
- Chapel of Santo António (Portuguese: Capela de Santo António/Capela de Nossa Senhora da Boa Viagem dos Homens do Mar)
- Chapel of São Sebastião (Portuguese: Capela de São Sebastião)
- Church of the Misericórdia (Portuguese: Igreja da Santa Casa da Misericórdia da Ericeira)
- Church of São Pedro (Portuguese: Igreja Paroquial da Ericeira/Igreja de São Pedro)

== Culture ==
The local philharmonic orchestra, currently named Filarmónica Cultural Ericeira, has existed since 1849.

== Sport ==
The beach of Ribeira d'Ilhas, which routinely hosts a round of the ASP World Tour Surf Championship and is widely regarded as one of the best beaches in Europe for this sport, is located 2 kilometres (1.2 mi) to the north of the town. In 2011, Ericeira was chosen by the WSR to be one of the World Surfing Reserves, together with Malibu and Santa Cruz in California, Manly Beach in Australia, and Huanchaco in Peru. The local council have redeveloped the Ribeira d'Ilhas foreshore to commemorate and show their support for the importance of surfing to the local culture and economy.

The Grupo Desportivo União Ericeirense, widely referred to as Ericeirense (which means “from Ericeira”), has a football team and was founded on 1 December 1921. Matheus Nunes, as a footballer, and Luís Freire, as a coach, are among the most successful persons in the sport who once were part of the team.

== See also ==
- Count of Ericeira
