= Ian Cathro =

Scottish footballer and coach

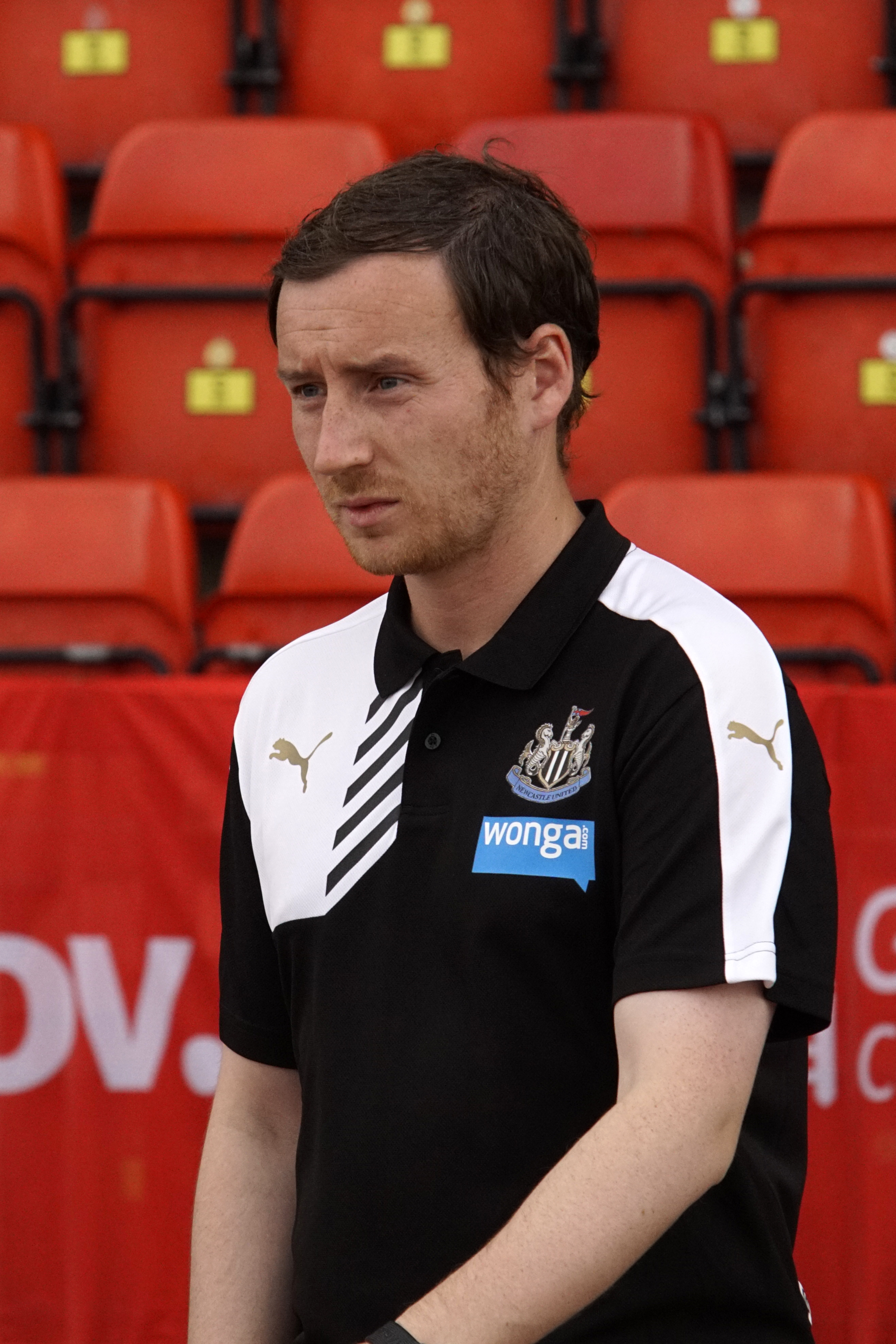
- Cathro with Newcastle United in 2015

Personal information
- Date of birth: 11 July 1986 (age 40)
- Place of birth: Dundee, Scotland

Team information
- Current team: Saint-Étienne (manager)

Youth career
- Years: Team
- Forfar Athletic
- Brechin City

Managerial career
- 2016–2017: Heart of Midlothian
- 2024–2026: Estoril
- 2026–: Saint-Étienne

Ian Cathro (born 11 July 1986) is a Scottish football coach and former player who is the head coach of French Ligue 2 club Saint-Étienne.

Cathro was previously an assistant coach at Rio Ave, Valencia, Newcastle United and Tottenham Hotspur, and was briefly the head coach at Scottish Premiership club Hearts. He then spent two years as the head coach at Primeira Liga club Estoril.

== Playing career ==
Cathro played youth football for Forfar Athletic and Brechin City.

== Coaching career ==
=== Youth coach ===
After working as a local youth coach in Dundee, Cathro became the head of Dundee United's youth academy at the age of 22. During his time with Dundee United, he also worked for the Scottish Football Association's local youth programme. Ryan Gauld has cited Cathro as one of the biggest influences on his career.

=== Assistant manager ===
In 2012, he became the assistant manager of Portuguese club Rio Ave. In 2014, he followed Nuno, his manager at Rio Ave, to Spanish club Valencia, where he also became assistant manager. The two had first met at an SFA coaching course in Scotland in 2009. He resigned his Valencia post on 11 June 2015.

A fortnight later, he agreed to join Premier League side Newcastle United as assistant to Steve McClaren, the recently appointed manager. When McClaren was sacked by Newcastle United in March 2016 and replaced by Rafa Benítez, Cathro was thought highly enough of to be retained as assistant manager.

=== Heart of Midlothian ===
Cathro was appointed head coach of Scottish Premiership club Heart of Midlothian on 5 December 2016. The appointment caused some debate within Scottish football. Kilmarnock player Kris Boyd questioned whether such a young manager, with limited playing experience, could command the respect of the squad. Hearts performed poorly in the second half of the 2016–17 season, winning 5 of 22 league games after Cathro was appointed. They fell to fifth place in the league and were knocked out of the 2016–17 Scottish Cup by their Edinburgh derby rivals Hibernian. After Hearts failed to qualify from the 2017–18 Scottish League Cup group stage, Cathro was sacked. Celtic manager Brendan Rodgers said that there appeared to be a "confused" approach at Hearts, with a mismatch between the style of play Cathro wanted to implement and the type of players signed by the club. After Cathro left, Hearts interim manager Jon Daly and player Cole Stockton claimed that the physical training under Cathro had lacked intensity.

=== Assistant to Nuno ===
After almost a year out of football, Cathro was appointed first-team coach at Wolverhampton Wanderers in June 2018, linking up again with Nuno, who Cathro worked with in Portugal and Spain.

On 3 July 2021, Cathro followed former-Wolves manager Nuno to Tottenham Hotspur, becoming assistant head coach.

Cathro again followed Nuno when in the summer of 2022 the later was appointed as manager of Saudi club Al-Ittihad, with Cathro becoming First Team coach.

=== Estoril ===
In July 2024 he was appointed head coach of Portuguese club Estoril. After a "difficult initial three months in charge", he won the league's Manager of the Month award in February 2025. He coached Estoril to an 8th placed finish in the 2024-2025 season, and 10th the following year.

=== Saint-Étienne ===
On 9 June 2026 he was appointed head coach of French club Saint-Étienne.

== Managerial statistics ==
As of match played 21 November 2026

Team	From	To	Record					Ref
Team	From	To	P	W	D	L	Win %	Ref
Heart of Midlothian	5 December 2016	1 August 2017	30	8	7	15	26.67	
Estoril	1 July 2024	9 June 2026	71	23	20	28	32.39	
Saint-Étienne	9 June 2026	Present	14	11	1	2	78.57	
Total			115	42	28	45	36.52	—

== Honours ==
Individual

- Primeira Liga Manager of the Month: January 2025, January 2026
