= Pedro Carvalho (footballer) =

Portuguese footballer (born 2003)

Personal information
- Full name: Pedro Maria Salgueiro Costa Pessoa Carvalho
- Date of birth: 14 February 2003 (age 23)
- Place of birth: Caldas da Rainha, Portugal
- Height: 1.76 m (5 ft 9 in)
- Position: Right-back

Team information
- Current team: Estoril
- Number: 22

Youth career
- 2010–2011: ACR Nadadouro
- 2011–2019: Sporting CP
- 2019–2022: Os Belenenses

Senior career*
Years	Team	Apps	(Gls)
2022–2024	Os Belenenses	28	(3)
2024–	Estoril	45	(0)
- * Club domestic league appearances and goals as of 25 May 2026

Pedro Maria Salgueiro Costa Pessoa Carvalho (born 14 February 2003) is a Portuguese professional footballer who plays as a right-back for the Primeira Liga club Estoril.

== Career ==
Carvalho is a youth product of ACR Nadadouro, Sporting CP and Os Belenenses. On 30 July 2022, he was promoted to the senior Os Belenenses side. In his debut season, he helped them earn promotion from the Liga 3 to the Liga Portugal 2, and he signed a one-year extension with the club on 29 June 2023 for the season. On 26 January 2024, he again extended his contract with Os Belenenses until 2025. On 26 July 2024, he transferred to Estoril in Primeira Liga until 2028.
