= G.D. Estoril Praia =

Portuguese professional sports club

Estoril
- Full name: Grupo Desportivo Estoril Praia
- Nicknames: Canarinhos (Canaries); Equipa da Linha; Estorilistas; Mágico Estoril
- Founded: 17 May 1939; 87 years ago
- Stadium: Estádio António Coimbra da Mota
- Capacity: 5,094
- Owner: Global Football Holdings
- President: Rui Costa
- Head coach: Leandro Pires (caretaker)
- League: Primeira Liga
- 2025–26: Primeira Liga, 10th of 18
- Website: www.estorilpraia.pt
Home colours	Away colours

Grupo Desportivo Estoril Praia (Portuguese pronunciation: [ɨʃtuˈɾil ˈpɾajɐ]), commonly known as Estoril, is a Portuguese professional sports club from Estoril, Cascais, Lisbon. Founded on 17 May 1939, its football team currently plays in Primeira Liga and hold home games at the Estádio António Coimbra da Mota, with a seating capacity of 5,094. As a sports club, Estoril has departments for football, futsal and basketball.

Since the club's establishment, the senior football team has won nine secondary trophies, with the most recent being the 2011–12 Liga de Honra. As a result, some personnel of the club received awards in relation to their performances in the 2011–12 season, of which include Licá, who won the LPFP Liga de Honra Player of the Year, Vagner, who won the LPFP Liga de Honra Goalkeeper of the Year, and Marco Silva, who won the LPFP Liga de Honra Coach of the Year.

== History ==
=== Early beginnings ===
The club was founded on 17 May 1939 as Grupo Desportivo Estoril Plage by, among others, Joaquim Cardim, José Ereia, João Rebelo, Armando Vilar, Ernesto Tomás, and Joaquim Nunes. The club's principal promoter was Fausto Cardoso de Figueiredo, the wealthy owner of the Lisbon-Cascais railway, the English hotels of the city, Paris and the Palace, the bath building, and the Estoril Casino. The team's badge and kit colours were inspired by Estoril's many beaches, considered the best in all of Portugal. The yellow symbolizes the colour of the sun, while the blue symbolizes the colour of the neighbouring Atlantic Ocean.

When the club was initially established it began to play in the Campeonato de Lisboa which was a league competition contested by teams from Lisbon. It also began to compete in the Taça de Portugal. Four years after its establishment, the club has reached the Taça de Portugal final in the 1943–44 season in which they lost to Benfica 8–0 at the Campo das Salésias in Lisbon.

Following that season the club reached for the Primeira Liga in the 1944–45 season where they finished seventh in their very first season in Portugal's top flight division. The next season saw the club play in the 1945–46 Segunda Divisão and the 1945–46 Campeonato de Lisboa. The club remained in the top flight until the 1952–53 Primeira Divisão season where they finished last and were relegated to the Portuguese Second Division.

=== Decline and revival ===
The next season saw them begin their football life in the Segunda Divisão. Estoril played in the division for 22 years before gaining promotion to the top flight again. Following the appointment of experienced English manager Jimmy Hagan in 1973 who prior to being appointed as manager of Estoril had managed Benfica to three consecutive league titles in 1970–71, 1971–72 and 1972–73 as well as a Taça de Portugal in the 1971–72 season he helped the club achieve promotion to Primeira Liga. The club's return saw them finish an impressive eighth place in the league as well as a quarter-finalist in the cup competition. The next ten years saw the club remain in a stable position finishing in mid-table positions up until the mid-1980s.

In the late 1980s, the club appointed Fernando Santos as manager. A young coach who had played for the club during his professional career in the 1970s who had retired due to several injuries. He helped the club rebuild itself and improve its players and after three years in charge he helped them gain promotion once again to the top flight at the age of 36. During his time he helped the club establish themselves as a Primeira Liga club up until the 1993–94 season, when he left the club for Estrela da Amadora, and Estoril in that very season were relegated to the second tier.

After the departure of Fernando Santos as manager in 1994, the club was stuck around the Liga de Honra (D2). Since after the Liga de Honra's establishment the club participated in fourteen seasons in that division. In the 1998–99 Liga de Honra season, the club suffered relegation to the third tier of Portuguese football for the first time in their history. Then the club suffered several promotions and relegations.

=== 21st century ===
At the beginning of the new millennium, the club was playing in the Portuguese Second Division. Ulisses Morais took over in 2002 and led the club to back to back promotions leading the club to the top flight. Litos took over for the 2004–05 Primeira Liga season where the club finished seventeenth and were relegated after one season.

In the 2011–12 season, the club was promoted to first division by winning the Liga de Honra five points ahead of second place Moreirense. With new owners and under the management of Marco Silva who halfway through the season took over from Vinícius Eutrópio, the team claimed the second Liga de Honra title in the club's history. The main players on the title roster were João Coimbra, Licá, Steven Vitória and Vagner. The 2012–13 season marked the return of the club to the Primeira Liga and saw them finish in an impressive fifth place in the league, from the position of newly promoted, and also qualify for the third qualifying round of Europa League, marking its first presence in the European competitions. Estoril reached Europa League group stages after defeating Hapoel Ramat Gan and Pasching. They finished fourth place in a group against Sevilla, Freiburg and Slovan Liberec, with only three points in three draws against Sevilla and Freiburg (twice). In the 2013–14 season, Estoril finished in fourth place, marking its best performance ever in the Portuguese first division, qualifying directly to Europa League's Group Stage.

American investor David Blitzer, through his company Global Football Holdings, purchased a majority stake in the club in May 2019.

== Stadium ==
Estoril currently play at the Estádio António Coimbra da Mota which holds a seating capacity of 8,000. The stadium also plays host to Estoril's reserve team home games.

The Sweden national team used the stadium as a training ground in preparation for UEFA Euro 2004. The stadium has also played host to matches of Portuguese youth team games most notably the Portuguese national under-21 football team.

The stadium has also played host to games involving the Portuguese national rugby union team, most recently being against Ukraine in a 2006 European Nations Cup First Division match and against Uruguay in a 2007 Rugby World Cup repechage qualification match.

== European cup history ==
Season	Competition	Round	Opponent	Home	Away	Aggregate
2013–14	UEFA Europa League	3Q	(Israel) Hapoel Ramat Gan	0–0	1–0	1–0
2013–14	UEFA Europa League	Play-off	(Austria) Pasching	2–0	2–1	4–1
2013–14	UEFA Europa League	Group H	(Spain) Sevilla	1–2	1–1	4th place
2013–14	UEFA Europa League	Group H	(Czech Republic) Slovan Liberec	1–2	1–2	4th place
2013–14	UEFA Europa League	Group H	(Germany) Freiburg	0–0	1–1	4th place
2014–15	UEFA Europa League	Group E	(Netherlands) PSV Eindhoven	3–3	0–1	3rd place
2014–15	UEFA Europa League	Group E	(Greece) Panathinaikos	2–0	1–1	3rd place
2014–15	UEFA Europa League	Group E	(Russia) Dynamo Moscow	1–2	0–1	3rd place

== Players ==
=== Current squad ===
As of 10 September 2026

Note: Flags indicate national team as defined under FIFA eligibility rules; some limited exceptions apply. Players may hold more than one non-FIFA nationality.

No.	Pos.	Nation	Player
1	GK	ESP	Joel Robles
2	DF	ESP	Ricard Sánchez
3	DF	ESP	Fernando Medrano
4	DF	POR	Ferro
5	DF	BEL	Antef Tsoungui
6	DF	ESP	Xavi Sintes
7	FW	POR	André Lacximicant
8	MF	POR	Xeka
9	FW	FRA	Axel Camblan
10	MF	SCO	Jordan Holsgrove
11	FW	BIH	Nail Omerović
12	MF	POR	João Carvalho (captain)
14	FW	MAR	Yanis Begraoui
15	DF	ESP	Ismael Sierra
16	GK	SLO	Martin Turk
17	FW	POR	Peixinho

No.	Pos.	Nation	Player
19	DF	POR	Tiago Parente
21	DF	CRO	Roko Jurišić
22	DF	POR	Pedro Carvalho
23	GK	POR	Diogo Dias
25	DF	CYP	Stelios Andreou (on loan from Widzew Łódź)
35	DF	ENG	Samuel Amissah (on loan from Fulham U21)
38	FW	ESP	Israel Salazar
42	DF	POR	Jordan Arnolin
43	GK	RSA	Fletcher Smythe-Lowe
44	MF	FRA	Milan Robin
80	MF	POR	Luís Gomes
90	MF	POR	Tiago Brito
98	DF	CPV	Fabrício Garcia
99	FW	ALG	Rafik Guitane
—	FW	ENG	Khayon Edwards

=== Out on loan ===
Note: Flags indicate national team as defined under FIFA eligibility rules; some limited exceptions apply. Players may hold more than one non-FIFA nationality.

No.	Pos.	Nation	Player
18	DF	POR	Gonçalo Costa (at Gorica until 30 June 2027)

== Honours ==
=== Domestic honours ===
- Taça de Portugal
  - Runners-up (1): 1943–44
- Taça da Liga
  - Runners-up (1): 2023–24
- Liga Portugal 2
  - Winners (3): 2003–04, 2011–12, 2020–21
- Portuguese Second Division
  - Winners (5): 1941–42, 1943–44, 1945–46, 1974–75, 2002–03
- Liga Intercalar
  - Winners (1): 2009–10
- "FPF" Cup (First Division)
  - Runners-up (1): 1976–77
- AF Lisbon First Division
  - Winners (1): 1968–69

=== Personnel honours ===
- LPFP Liga Portugal 2 Player of the Year
  - 2011–12 : Licá
  - 2020–21 : Miguel Crespo
- LPFP Liga Portugal 2 Breakthrough Player of the Year
  - 2020–21 : André Vidigal
- LPFP Liga Portugal 2 Goalkeeper of the Year
  - 2011–12 : Vagner
  - 2020–21 : Dani Figueira
- LPFP Liga Portugal 2 Coach of the Year
  - 2011–12 : Marco Silva

== Coaching staff ==
As of 1 July 2026

Position	Staff
Head coach	Vacant
Assistant head coach	(Portugal) Paulo Mateus
First-team coach	(Portugal) Marco Pimenta
Goalkeeping coach	(Portugal) Pedro Miranda
Video Analyst	(Portugal) Marco Pedroso

== Coaching history ==
- (Portugal) Augusto Silva (1942–45)
- (Hungary) Lippo Hertzka (1946–47)
- (Hungary) János Biri (1947–49)
- (England) Jimmy Hagan (1973–75)
- (Portugal) António Medeiros (1975–77)
- (Portugal) José Torres (1979–81)
- (England) Jimmy Hagan (1981–82)
- (Mozambique) Mário Wilson (1983–84)
- (Portugal) António Medeiros (1984)
- (Mozambique) Mário Wilson (1984–86)
- (Portugal) António Fidalgo (1986–87)
- (Portugal) Fernando Santos (1987–94)
- (Portugal) Carlos Manuel (1994–96)
- (Portugal) Isidro Beato (1996–98)
- (Portugal) Rui Águas (1998–99)
- (Portugal) Minervino Pietra (1999–00)
- (Portugal) José Rachão (2000–01)
- (Portugal) José Morais (2001–02)
- (Portugal) Ulisses Morais (1 Nov 2002 – 23 August 2004)
- (Portugal) Litos (24 Aug 2004 – 30 June 2005)
- (Mozambique) Daúto Faquirá (1 July 2005 – 5 January 2006)
- (Portugal) Marco Paulo (6 Jan 2006 – 27 January 2006)
- (Portugal) Litos (28 Jan 2006 – 24 May 2007)
- (Portugal) Tulipa (28 May 2007 – 24 September 2008)
- (Portugal) Manuel Pinho (interim) (25 September 2008 – 29 September 2008)
- (Portugal) João Carlos Pereira (30 September 2008 – 25 May 2009)
- (Portugal) Hélder Cristóvão (1 July 2009 – 28 September 2009)
- (Portugal) Professor Neca (29 September 2009 – 10 May 2010)
- (Brazil) Vinícius Eutrópio (14 May 2010 – 27 September 2011)
- (Portugal) Marco Silva (28 September 2011 – 12 May 2014)
- (Portugal) José Couceiro (24 May 2014 – 3 March 2015)
- (Brazil) Fabiano Soares (5 March 2015 – 10 December 2016)
- (Spain) Pedro Gómez Carmona (13 December 2016 – 8 March 2017)
- (Portugal) Pedro Emanuel (8 March 2017 – 21 October 2017)
- (Portugal) Filipe Pedro (interim) (22 October 2017 – 12 November 2017)
- (Portugal) Ivo Vieira (13 November 2017 – 30 June 2018)
- (Portugal) Luís Freire (1 July 2018 – 21 January 2019)
- (Portugal) Bruno Baltazar (22 January 2019 – 30 June 2019)
- (Portugal) Tiago Fernandes (1 July 2019 – 6 January 2020)
- (Portugal) Pedro Duarte (8 January 2020 – 30 June 2020)
- (Portugal) Bruno Pinheiro (1 July 2020 – 30 June 2022)
- (Portugal) Nélson Veríssimo (1 July 2022 – 24 February 2023)
- (Portugal) Ricardo Soares (28 February 2023 – 8 June 2023)
- (Portugal) Álvaro Pacheco (1 July 2023 – 24 September 2023)
- (Portugal) Vasco Seabra (25 September 2023 – 30 June 2024)
- (Scotland) Ian Cathro (1 July 2024 – 9 June 2026)
- (Portugal) Vasco Matos (8 July 2026 - 15 October 2026)

== League and cup history ==
Season	Div.	Pos.	Pl.	W	D	L	GS	GA	P	Cup	League Cup	Notes
1944–45	1D	7	18	6	4	8	44	34	16	Round 1		^{[A]}
1945–46	2D	–	–	–	–	–	–	–	–	Round 1		^{[A]}
1946–47	1D	5	26	16	1	9	96	55	33	not held		^{[C]}
1947–48	1D	4	26	16	4	6	91	49	36	Quarter-final		^{[D]}
1948–49	1D	5	26	12	5	9	76	54	29	Round 1		
1949–50	1D	12	26	7	7	12	50	59	21	not held		^{[E]}
1950–51	1D	11	26	10	1	15	53	58	21	Quarter-final		
1951–52	1D	9	26	8	5	13	49	61	21	Round 1		
1952–53	1D	14	26	5	4	17	28	64	14	Round 1		Relegated
1975–76	1D	8	30	10	8	12	31	45	28	Quarter-final		
1976–77	1D	11	30	6	13	11	26	36	25	Round 4		
1977–78	1D	11	30	8	9	13	25	36	25	Round 4		
1978–79	1D	11	30	8	10	12	24	42	26	Round 5		
1979–80	1D	14	30	5	11	14	18	37	21	Round 4		Relegated
1980–81	2D.S	1	30	17	9	4	48	20	43	Round 4		Promoted
1981–82	1D	12	30	7	10	13	30	41	24	Round 5		
1982–83	1D	11	30	9	8	13	26	39	26	Round 6		
1983–84	1D	14	30	6	9	15	22	51	21	Quarter-final		
1990–91	2H	2	38	17	12	9	48	28	46	Round 4		Promoted
1991–92	1D	10	34	10	10	14	34	54	30	Round 4		
1992–93	1D	13	34	9	12	13	29	41	30	Round 4		
1993–94	1D	18	34	5	8	21	22	57	18	Round 4		Relegated
1994–95	2H	5	34	16	9	9	39	20	41	Round 4		
1995–96	2H	12	34	12	8	14	52	42	44	Round 5		
1996–97	2H	7	34	13	8	13	34	35	47	Quarter-final		
1997–98	2H	7	34	11	13	10	40	39	46	Round 6		
1998–99	2H	18	34	6	10	18	23	50	28	Round 3		Relegated
1999–00	2DS	4	38	18	3	7	67	40	67	Round 4		
2000–01	2DS	12	38	14	11	13	45	46	53	Round 6		
2001–02	2DS	5	38	17	8	13	46	44	59	Round 2		
2002–03	2DS	1	38	25	8	5	74	29	83	Round 3		Promoted
2003–04	2H	1	34	20	7	7	63	40	67	Quarter-final		Promoted
2004–05	1D	17	34	8	6	20	38	55	30	Round 5		Relegated
2005–06	2H	9	34	11	12	11	44	43	45	Round 5		
2006–07	2H	10	30	10	7	13	30	35	37	Round 4		
2007–08	2H	7	30	11	8	11	41	38	41	Round 3	Round 2	
2008–09	2H	4	30	12	8	10	41	37	44	Round 3	Round 2	
2009–10	2H	11	30	7	14	9	26	29	35	Round 2	Second Group Stage	
2010–11	2H	10	30	9	11	10	36	31	38	Round 3	Second Group Stage	
2011–12	2H	1	30	16	9	5	40	20	57	Round 5	Second Group Stage	Promoted
2012–13	1D	5	30	13	6	11	47	37	45	Round 3	Second Group Stage	Qualified to Europa League
2013–14	1D	4	30	15	9	6	42	26	54	Quarter-final	Second Group Stage	Qualified to Europa League
2014–15	1D	12	34	9	13	12	38	56	40	Round 3	Second Group Stage	
2015–16	1D	8	34	13	8	13	40	41	47	Quarter-final	Round 2	
2016–17	1D	10	34	10	8	16	34	42	38	Semi-final	Round 2	
2017–18	1D	18	34	8	6	20	29	61	30	Round 3	Round 2	Relegated
2018–19	2H	3	34	16	6	12	49	42	54	Round 3	Second Group Stage	
2019–20	2H	4	24	11	3	9	35	26	39	Round 3	Round 2	^{[F]}
2020–21	2H	1	34	20	10	4	55	26	70	Semi-final	Quarter-final	Promoted
2021–22	1D	9	34	9	12	13	36	43	39	Round 5	Round 2	
2022–23	1D	14	34	10	5	19	33	49	35	Round 4	Group stage	
2023–24	1D	13	34	9	6	19	49	58	33	Round 5	Final	
2024–25	1D									Round 3	-	

A. ^A Also participated in the Campeonato de Lisboa.
C. ^C The Taça de Portugal was not held due to the end of the regional championships. As a result of this, a new format and scheduling scheme was introduced for the competition.
D. ^D Best league classification finish in the club's history.
E. ^E The Taça de Portugal was not held due to the Latin Cup being held at the Estádio Nacional.
E. ^F Due to COVID-19 pandemic in Portugal, LigaPro was cancelled with 10 matches to play.

Last updated: 18 July 2014
Div. = Division; 1D = Portuguese League; 2H = Liga de Honra; 2DS/2D = Portuguese Second Division
Pos. = Position; Pl = Match played; W = Win; D = Draw; L = Lost; GS = Goal scored; GA = Goal against; P = Points
