= 2025–26 C.D. Nacional season =

C.D. Nacional
2025–26 season
- President: Rui Alves
- Head coach: Tiago Margarido
- Stadium: Estádio da Madeira
- Primeira Liga: 14th
- Taça de Portugal: Fourth round
- Top goalscorer: League: Jesús Ramírez (9); All: Jesús Ramírez (10)
Home colours	Away colours	Third colours

The 2025–26 season is the 115th season in the history of Nacional and their consecutive season back in the first division of Portuguese football. The club is participating in the Primeira Liga, the Taça de Portugal, and the Taça da Liga.

== Players ==
=== Current squad ===
As of 27 August 2025

Note: Flags indicate national team as defined under FIFA eligibility rules; some limited exceptions apply. Players may hold more than one non-FIFA nationality.

No.	Pos.	Nation	Player
1	GK	BRA	Kaique Pereira (on loan from Palmeiras)
2	DF	POR	João Aurélio (captain)
4	DF	BRA	Ulisses
5	DF	POR	José Gomes
6	MF	BRA	Matheus Dias
7	FW	MOZ	Witi
8	MF	ESP	Miguel Baeza
9	FW	VEN	Jesús Ramírez
10	MF	BRA	Daniel Júnior
11	FW	BRA	Paulinho Bóia
12	GK	BRA	César Augusto
14	DF	CPV	Ivanildo Fernandes
15	MF	TUN	Chiheb Labidi
16	DF	PAR	Alan Núñez (on loan from Cerro Porteño)
17	FW	TUN	Motez Nourani
18	MF	POR	André Sousa

No.	Pos.	Nation	Player
19	FW	ANG	Lucas João
20	MF	POR	Jota
21	MF	CRO	Festim Shatri
22	MF	POR	Filipe Soares
24	DF	FRA	Lenny Vallier
26	MF	POR	Joel Silva
28	MF	BRA	Igor Liziero
30	MF	POR	Martim Gustavo
33	DF	POR	Francisco Gonçalves
34	DF	BRA	Léo Santos
37	GK	BRA	Lucas França
38	DF	BRA	Zé Vitor
48	MF	BRA	Josué Souza
50	GK	BRA	Kevyn Vinícius
88	MF	BRA	Deivison Souza
99	FW	BRA	Pablo Ruan

== Transfers ==
=== In ===
Date	Pos.	Player	From	Type	Ref.
30 June 2025	DF	(France) Lenny Vallier	(France) Guingamp	Transfer	
30 June 2025	MF	(Portugal) Martim Gustavo	(Portugal) Estoril	Transfer	
2 July 2025	MF	(Brazil) Douglas Nathan	(Brazil) São Caetano	Transfer	
2 July 2025	GK	(Brazil) Kevyn Vinícius	(Brazil) Fluminense	Transfer	
2 July 2025	FW	(Tunisia) Motez Nourani	(Turkey) Adana Demirspor	Transfer	
2 July 2025	FW	(Brazil) Pablo Ruan	(Brazil) Londrina	Transfer	
3 July 2025	MF	(Brazil) Deivison Souza	(Brazil) Hope Internacional	Transfer	
4 July 2025	DF	(Paraguay) Alan Núñez	(Paraguay) Cerro Porteño	Loan in	
5 July 2025	FW	(Venezuela) Jesús Ramírez	(Portugal) Vitória	Transfer	
10 July 2025	MF	(Brazil) Josué Souza	(Brazil) Grêmio	Transfer	
11 July 2025	MF	(Brazil) Matheus Dias	(Brazil) Internacional	Transfer	
14 July 2025	GK	(Brazil) Kaique Pereira	(Brazil) Palmeiras	Loan in	
21 July 2025	FW	(Angola) Lucas João	(Turkey) Ümraniyespor	Transfer	
22 July 2025	MF	(Portugal) Filipe Soares	(Greece) PAOK	Transfer	
25 July 2025	MF	(Brazil) Igor Liziero	(Brazil) São Paulo	Transfer	
25 July 2025	FW	(Mozambique) Witi	(United Arab Emirates) Dibba Al-Hisn	Transfer	
30 July 2025	MF	(Portugal) Joel Silva	(Portugal) Boavista	Transfer	
27 August 2025	MF	(Brazil) Daniel Júnior	(Brazil) Vitória	Transfer	
13 January 2026	FW	(Brazil) Gabriel Veron	(Portugal) Porto	Loan in	

=== Out ===
Date	Pos.	Player	To	Type	Ref.
1 June 2025	MF	(Senegal) Djibril Soumaré	(Portugal) Braga	End of loan	
17 June 2025	MF	(Japan) Fūki Yamada	(Japan) Kyoto Sanga	End of loan	
21 June 2025	MF	(Portugal) Luís Esteves	(Portugal) Gil Vicente	Transfer	
24 June 2025	MF	(Portugal) Bruno Costa	(South Korea) Gyeongnam	Transfer	
27 June 2025	FW	(Portugal) Rúben Macedo	(South Korea) Gyeongnam	Transfer	
30 June 2025	FW	(England) Arvin Appiah	(Spain) Almería	End of loan	
30 June 2025	MF	(Brazil) Daniel Penha	(Brazil) Atlético Mineiro	End of loan	
30 June 2025	FW	(Brazil) Isaac	(Brazil) Atlético Mineiro	End of loan	
30 June 2025	MF	(Brazil) Gustavo Garcia	(Brazil) Palmeiras	End of loan	
30 June 2025	MF	(Brazil) Matheus Dias	(Brazil) Internacional	End of loan	
30 June 2025	GK	(Portugal) Rui Encarnação	(Portugal) Machico	Released	
30 June 2025	FW	(Brazil) Dudu	(Mexico) Mazatlán	Released	
3 July 2025	FW	(Cameroon) Joel Tagueu	(Vietnam) Hải Phòng	Transfer	
22 August 2025	MF	(Brazil) Douglas Nathan	(Brazil) Araçatuba	Transfer	

=== Contract renewals ===
Date	Pos.	Player	Contract length	Contract ends	Ref.
30 June 2025	DF	(Portugal) João Aurélio	One year	2026	
30 June 2025	MF	(Portugal) André Sousa	One year	2026	

== Competitions ==
=== Overall record ===
Competition	First match	Last match	Starting round	Final position	Record							
Competition	First match	Last match	Starting round	Final position	Pld	W	D	L	GF	GA	GD	Win %
Primeira Liga	9 August 2025	16 May 2026	Matchday 7	TBD	7	2	1	4	6	10	−4	28.57
Taça de Portugal	17–20 October 2025	TBD	Third round	TBD	0	0	0	0	0	0	+0	—
Taça da Liga	28–30 October 2025	TBD	Quarter-finals	TBD	0	0	0	0	0	0	+0	—
Total					7	2	1	4	6	10	−4	28.57

Last updated: 1 October 2025
Source: Soccerway

=== Primeira Liga ===
==== League table ====
Pos	Team	Pld	W	D	L	GF	GA	GD	Pts	Qualification or relegation
12	Rio Ave	34	8	12	14	35	57	−22	36 (Note: Head-to-head points: Rio Ave 4, Santa Clara 1.)	
13	Santa Clara	34	9	9	16	32	41	−9	36	
14	Nacional	34	9	7	18	37	45	−8	34	
15	Estrela da Amadora	34	6	12	16	38	56	−18	30 (Note: Head-to-head points: Estrela da Amadora 6, Casa Pia 0.)	
16	Casa Pia (O)	34	6	12	16	31	57	−26	30	Qualification for the relegation play-offs

Source: Liga Portugal
Rules for classification: 1) Points; 2) Head-to-head points; 3) Head-to-head goal difference; 4) Goal difference; 5) Matches won; 6) Goals scored; 7) Play-off.
(O) Play-off winners

==== Results summary ====
Overall								Home						Away					
Pld	W	D	L	GF	GA	GD	Pts	W	D	L	GF	GA	GD	W	D	L	GF	GA	GD
7	2	1	4	6	10	−4	7	0	0	3	2	8	−6	2	1	1	4	2	+2

Last updated: 17 August 2025.
Source: Liga Portugal

==== Results by round ====
Round	1	2	3	4	5	6	7	8	9	10	11	12	13	14	15	16	17	18	19	20	21	22	23	24	25	26	27	28	29	30	31	32	33	34
Ground	H	A	H	A	A	H	A																											
Result	L	D	L	W	L	L	W																											
Position	15	14	16	9	14	15	13																											
Points	0	1	0	3	0	0	3																											

Source: Liga Portugal
A = Away; H = Home; W = Win; D = Draw; L = Loss; P = Postponed

==== Matches ====
9 August 2025 1	Nacional	0–2	Gil Vicente	Funchal
15:30 WEST (UTC+01:00)		Report	Pablo 35'; Esteves 45+2'	Stadium: Estádio da Madeira; Attendance: 1,663; Referee: David Rafael Silva

17 August 2025 2	Rio Ave	1–1	Nacional	Vila do Conde
15:30 WEST (UTC+01:00)	Clayton 13'	Report	Ulisses (yellow card) 36' (yellow-red card) 39'; Ramírez 83'	Stadium: Estádio do Rio Ave; Attendance: 2,452; Referee: Claudio Pereira

23 August 2025 3	Nacional	1–4	Sporting CP	Funchal
18:00 WEST (UTC+01:00)	Santos 3'	Report	Gonçalves 52', 76', 90+3'; Harder 83'	Stadium: Estádio da Madeira; Attendance: 4,394; Referee: Bruno Costa

30 August 2025 4	Casa Pia	0–2	Nacional	Rio Maior
15:30 WEST (UTC+01:00)		Report	Bóia 33'; Ramírez 42'	Stadium: Estádio Municipal de Rio Maior; Attendance: João Pinheiro; Referee: 1,351

13 September 2025 5	Porto	1–0	Nacional	Porto
18:00 WEST (UTC+01:00)	Aghehowa 31' (pen.)	Report		Stadium: Estádio do Dragão; Attendance: 47,285; Referee: Luís Godinho

20 September 2025 6	Nacional	1–2	Arouca	Funchal
15:30 WEST (UTC+01:00)	Popović 74'; Fontán (yellow card) 57' (yellow-red card) 85'; van Ee 89'	Report	Ramírez 66' (pen.); Dias (red card) 80'	Stadium: Estádio da Madeira; Attendance: 1,529; Referee: João Gonçalves

28 September 2025 7	Braga	0-1	Nacional	Braga
18:00 WEST (UTC+1)		Report	Ramírez 5'	Stadium: Estádio Municipal de Braga; Attendance: 13,502; Referee: Miguel Fonseca

4 October 2025 8	Nacional	v	Moreirense	Funchal
15:30 WEST (UTC+01:00)				Stadium: Estádio da Madeira

26 October 2025 9	Estoril	v	Nacional	Estoril
16:30 WEST (UTC+01:00)				Stadium: Estádio António Coimbra da Mota

1 November 2025 10	Nacional	v	Famalicão	Funchal
16:30 WEST (UTC+01:00)				Stadium: Estádio da Madeira

7 March 2026	Moreirense	v	Nacional	Moreira de Cónegos
—-:—- WEST (UTC+1)				Stadium: Parque Moreira de Cóngeos
