= 2024–25 C.D. Nacional season =

C.D. Nacional
2024–25 season
- President: Rui Alves
- Head coach: Tiago Margarido
- Stadium: Estádio da Madeira
- Primeira Liga: 14th
- Taça de Portugal: Third round
- Taça da Liga: Quarter-finals
- Top goalscorer: League: Zé Manuel (6); All: Zé Manuel (7)
- Average home league attendance: 2,396
- Biggest win: Nacional 4–0 Porto B
- Biggest defeat: Nacional 0–5 Braga
Home colours	Away colours

The 2024–25 season was the 114th season in the history of Nacional and their first season back in the first division of Portuguese football. The club participated in the Primeira Liga, the Taça de Portugal, and the Taça da Liga.

== Players ==
=== Current squad ===
As of 24 May 2025

Note: Flags indicate national team as defined under FIFA eligibility rules; some limited exceptions apply. Players may hold more than one non-FIFA nationality.

No.	Pos.	Nation	Player
1	GK	POR	Rui Encarnação
2	DF	POR	João Aurélio (captain)
4	DF	BRA	Ulisses (on loan from Vasco da Gama)
5	DF	POR	José Gomes
7	FW	POR	Rúben Macedo
8	MF	POR	Bruno Costa
10	MF	POR	Luís Esteves
12	GK	BRA	César Augusto
14	DF	CPV	Ivanildo Fernandes
15	MF	TUN	Chiheb Labidi
17	MF	BRA	Daniel Penha (on loan from Atlético Mineiro)
18	MF	POR	André Sousa
19	MF	ESP	Miguel Baeza
20	MF	POR	Jota

No.	Pos.	Nation	Player
22	MF	BRA	Gustavo Garcia (on loan from Palmeiras)
23	FW	BRA	Isaac (on loan from Atlético Mineiro)
27	MF	SEN	Djibril Soumaré (on loan from Braga)
33	DF	POR	Francisco Gonçalves
34	DF	BRA	Léo Santos
37	GK	BRA	Lucas França
38	DF	BRA	Zé Vitor
70	FW	ENG	Arvin Appiah (on loan from Almería)
71	MF	JPN	Fuki Yamada (on loan from Kyoto Sanga)
88	MF	BRA	Matheus Dias (on loan from Internacional)
89	FW	POR	Dyego Sousa
95	FW	CMR	Joel Tagueu
98	FW	BRA	Paulinho Bóia
99	FW	BRA	Dudu

== Transfers ==
Source: Soccerway

=== In ===
Pos.	Player	Transferred from	Fee	Date	Source
GK	(Brazil) César Augusto	(Brazil) Ceará	€80,000		
DF	(Brazil) Zé Vitor	(Brazil) Tombense			

== Competitions ==
=== Overall record ===
Competition	First match	Last match	Starting round	Final position	Record							
Competition	First match	Last match	Starting round	Final position	Pld	W	D	L	GF	GA	GD	Win %
Primeira Liga	10 August 2024	18 May 2025	Matchday 1	14th	34	9	7	18	32	50	−18	26.47
Taça de Portugal	20 October 2024	20 October 2024	Third round	Third round	1	0	0	1	1	2	−1	0.00
Taça da Liga	29 October 2024	29 October 2024	Quarter-finals	Quarter-finals	1	0	0	1	1	3	−2	0.00
Total					36	9	7	20	34	55	−21	25.00

Source: Soccerway

=== Primeira Liga ===
==== League table ====
Pos	Team	Pld	W	D	L	GF	GA	GD	Pts	Qualification or relegation
12	Arouca	34	9	11	14	35	49	−14	38	
13	Gil Vicente	34	8	10	16	34	47	−13	34	
14	Nacional	34	9	7	18	32	50	−18	34	
15	Estrela da Amadora	34	7	8	19	24	50	−26	29	
16	AVS (O)	34	5	12	17	25	60	−35	27 (Note: Head to head points: AVS 4, Farense 1.)	Qualification for the Relegation play-off

Source: Liga Portugal
Rules for classification: 1) Points; 2) Head-to-head points; 3) Head-to-head goal difference; 4) Goal difference; 5) Matches won; 6) Goals scored; 7) Play-off.
(O) Play-off winners

==== Results summary ====
Overall								Home						Away					
Pld	W	D	L	GF	GA	GD	Pts	W	D	L	GF	GA	GD	W	D	L	GF	GA	GD
34	9	7	18	32	50	−18	34	7	3	7	23	27	−4	2	4	11	9	23	−14

Source: Liga Portugal

=== Taça de Portugal ===
20 October 2024 Third round	Leiria	2–1	Nacional	Leiria
15:00 WEST (UTC+01:00)	Baixinho 33'; Daniel 40' (pen.)	Report	Dias 88' (pen.)	Stadium: Estádio Dr. Magalhães Pessoa; Referee: Gustavo Correia

=== Taça da Liga ===
29 October 2024 Quarter-finals	Sporting CP	3–1	Nacional	Lisbon
20:15 WET (UTC±0)	Hjulmand 53'; Gyökeres 65' (pen.), 70'	Report	Macedo 66'	Stadium: Estádio José Alvalade; Attendance: 32,622; Referee: Hélder Carvalho
