= 2022–23 C.D. Nacional season =

C.D. Nacional
2022–23 season
- President: Rui Alves
- Head coach: Filipe Cândido
- Stadium: Estádio da Madeira
- Liga Portugal 2: 13th
- Taça de Portugal: Semi-finals
- Taça da Liga: Group stage
- Top goalscorer: League: Zé Manuel (6); All: Zé Manuel (7)
- Biggest win: Nacional 4–0 Porto B
- Biggest defeat: Nacional 0–5 Braga

The 2022–23 season was the 112th season in the history of C.D. Nacional and their second consecutive season in the second division of Portuguese football. The club participated in the Liga Portugal 2, the Taça de Portugal, and the Taça da Liga. The season covered the period from 1 July 2022 to 30 June 2023.

== Players ==
As of 31 January 2023

Note: Flags indicate national team as defined under FIFA eligibility rules; some limited exceptions apply. Players may hold more than one non-FIFA nationality.

| No. | Pos. | Nation | Player |
|---|---|---|---|
| 1 | GK | POR | Rui Encarnação |
| 2 | DF | POR | João Aurélio |
| 3 | DF | POR | Rafa Vieira |
| 4 | DF | BRA | Paulo Vitor (on loan from Botafogo-PB) |
| 5 | DF | POR | José Gomes |
| 6 | MF | POR | Ismael (on loan from Moreirense) |
| 8 | MF | BIH | Vladan Danilović |
| 9 | FW | BRA | Bruno Gomes |
| 10 | MF | POR | Luís Esteves |
| 11 | FW | MOZ | Witi |
| 14 | DF | BRA | Lucas Oliveira |
| 15 | DF | BRA | Fábio Erins (on loan from Lusitânia) |
| 20 | MF | POR | Jota |
| 21 | MF | POR | Sérgio Marakis |

| No. | Pos. | Nation | Player |
|---|---|---|---|
| 22 | FW | COL | Pipe Gómez (on loan from Leones) |
| 25 | DF | POR | José Graça |
| 28 | FW | POR | Carlos Daniel |
| 29 | FW | POR | Zé Manuel (on loan from Rio Ave) |
| 30 | MF | POR | Martim Gustavo |
| 33 | DF | POR | Francisco Gonçalves |
| 37 | GK | BRA | Lucas França |
| 40 | DF | BRA | Clayton (on loan from EC São Bernardo) |
| 50 | GK | BRA | Vinicius Machado |
| 55 | DF | POR | André Sousa |
| 70 | MF | POR | Rúben Macedo |
| 77 | MF | BRA | Gustavo Silva (on loan from Comercial) |
| 99 | FW | BRA | Dudu |

== Pre-season and friendlies ==
Win Draw Loss Fixtures

| 16 July 2022 Friendly | Nacional (Portugal) | 0–1 | (Portugal) Marítimo | TBD |
| --:-- WEST (UTC+1) |

| 20 July 2022 Friendly | Boavista (Portugal) | 1–0 | (Portugal) Nacional | Porto |
| 16:00 WEST (UTC+1) | Njie 42' | | | Stadium: Campo de Treinos do Bessa; Attendance: 300 |

| 31 July 2022 Friendly | Nacional (Portugal) | 1–2 | (Portugal) Santa Clara | Funchal |
| 17:00 WEST (UTC+1) | Vieira 25' | | Costa 29' (pen.); Gabriel Silva 48' | Stadium: Estadio da Madeira |

| 21 September 2022 Friendly | Nacional (Portugal) | 4–3 | (Portugal) Marítimo B | Funchal |
| --:-- WEST (UTC+1) | | Report | | Stadium: Estadio da Madeira |

== Competitions ==
=== Overall record ===
| Competition | First match | Last match | Starting round | Final position | Record | | | | | | | |
| Competition | First match | Last match | Starting round | Final position | Pld | W | D | L | GF | GA | GD | Win % |
|---|---|---|---|---|---|---|---|---|---|---|---|---|
| Liga Portugal 2 | 6 August 2022 | 28 May 2023 | Matchday 1 | 13th | 34 | 10 | 9 | 15 | 35 | 46 | −11 | 29.41 |
| Taça de Portugal | 2 October 2022 | 25 April 2023 | Second round | Semi-finals | 7 | 5 | 1 | 1 | 14 | 10 | +4 | 71.43 |
| Taça da Liga | 19 November 2022 | 14 December 2022 | Group stage | Group stage | 3 | 2 | 0 | 1 | 4 | 3 | +1 | 66.67 |
| Total | | | | | 44 | 17 | 10 | 17 | 53 | 59 | −6 | 38.64 |

Source: Soccerway

=== Liga Portugal 2 ===
==== League table ====
| Pos | Team | Pld | W | D | L | GF | GA | GD | Pts |
|---|---|---|---|---|---|---|---|---|---|
| 11 | Tondela | 34 | 8 | 16 | 10 | 35 | 35 | 0 | 40 |
| 12 | Penafiel | 34 | 9 | 12 | 13 | 36 | 47 | −11 | 39 (Note: Penafiel are ahead of Nacional on head-to-head points: Penafiel 3–0 Nacional, Nacional 1–1 Pennafiel.) |
| 13 | Nacional | 34 | 10 | 9 | 15 | 35 | 46 | −11 | 39 |
| 14 | Benfica B (I) | 34 | 10 | 8 | 16 | 52 | 58 | −6 | 38 (Note: Benfica B are ahead of Leixões on head-to-head points: Benfica B 2–1 Leixões, Leixões 1–1 Benfica B. Leixões were deducted 1 point for financial irregularities.) |
| 15 | Leixões | 34 | 10 | 9 | 15 | 38 | 49 | −11 | 38 |

Updated to match(es) played on 28 May 2023. Source: Liga Portugal 2
Rules for classification: 1) Points; 2) Head-to-head points; 3) Head-to-head goal difference; 4) Head-to-head away goals scored; 5) Goal difference; 6) Matches won; 7) Goals scored; 8) Play-off.
(I) Ineligible for promotion

==== Results summary ====
| Overall | | | | | | | | Home | | | | | | Away | | | | | |
| Pld | W | D | L | GF | GA | GD | Pts | W | D | L | GF | GA | GD | W | D | L | GF | GA | GD |
|---|---|---|---|---|---|---|---|---|---|---|---|---|---|---|---|---|---|---|---|
| 34 | 10 | 9 | 15 | 35 | 46 | −11 | 39 | 5 | 3 | 9 | 18 | 21 | −3 | 5 | 6 | 6 | 17 | 25 | −8 |

Source: Liga Portugal

==== Results by round ====
| Round | 1 | 2 | 3 | 4 | 5 | 6 | 7 | 8 | 9 | 10 | 11 | 12 | 13 | 14 | 15 | 16 | 17 | 18 | 19 | 20 | 21 | 22 | 23 | 24 | 25 | 26 | 27 | 28 | 29 | 30 | 31 | 32 | 33 | 34 |
|---|---|---|---|---|---|---|---|---|---|---|---|---|---|---|---|---|---|---|---|---|---|---|---|---|---|---|---|---|---|---|---|---|---|---|
| Ground | H | A | H | A | H | A | H | A | H | A | H | A | H | H | A | H | A | A | H | A | H | A | H | A | H | A | H | A | H | A | A | H | A | H |
| Result | L | W | L | L | L | W | L | L | D | D | D | D | W | W | L | L | D | L | W | D | L | W | W | D | L | L | L | L | D | D | W | L | W | W |
| Position | | | | | | | | | | | | | | | | | | | | | | | | | | | | | | | | | | |

Source: Liga Portugal
A = Away; H = Home; W = Win; D = Draw; L = Loss

==== Matches ====
The league fixtures were announced on 5 July 2022.

| 6 August 2022 1 | Nacional | 0–1 | Tondela |

| 13 August 2022 2 | Torreense | 0–2 | Nacional |

| 21 August 2022 3 | Nacional | 0–2 | Mafra |

| 28 August 2022 4 | Leixões | 3–0 | Nacional |

| 4 September 2022 5 | Nacional | 1–3 | B-SAD |

| 11 September 2022 6 | Sporting da Covilhã | 1–2 | Nacional |

| 18 September 2022 7 | Nacional | 0–1 | Trofense |

| 9 October 2022 8 | Moreirense | 3–1 | Nacional |

| 19 October 2022 9 | Nacional | 1–1 | Vilafranquense |

| 23 October 2022 10 | Oliveirense | 0–0 | Nacional |

| 29 October 2022 11 | Nacional | 1–1 | Penafiel |

| 6 November 2022 12 | Feirense | 1–1 | Nacional |

| 12 November 2022 13 | Nacional | 4–0 | Porto B |

| 29 December 2022 14 | Nacional | 2–0 | Benfica B |
