= Lucas França (footballer) =

Brazilian footballer (born 1996)

Personal information
- Full name: Lucas Oliveira de França
- Date of birth: 19 January 1996 (age 30)
- Place of birth: Alhandra, Brazil
- Height: 1.94 m (6 ft 4 in)
- Position: Goalkeeper

Team information
- Current team: Santa Clara
- Number: 1

Youth career
- 2011–2016: Cruzeiro

Senior career*
Years	Team	Apps	(Gls)
2016–2022	Cruzeiro	8	(0)
2018–2019	→ Nacional (loan)	7	(0)
2019–2020	→ Ceará (loan)	1	(0)
2021	→ Guarani (loan)	0	(0)
2022–2026	Nacional	79	(0)
2026–	Santa Clara	7	(0)
- * Club domestic league appearances and goals as of 20 September 2026

Lucas Oliveira de França (born 19 January 1996), known as Lucas França, is a Brazilian professional footballer who plays as a goalkeeper for Portuguese Primeira Liga club Santa Clara.

== Professional career ==
França arrived at Cruzeiro in 2011. He had a standout career at Cruzeiro's youth teams. In 2016, he was the fourth goalkeeper at Cruzeiro; however, due to a series of events, he became the first goalkeeper, making his professional debut on August 8, 2016 in a match against Corinthians for the Campeonato Brasileiro.

On 22 July 2026, Lucas França signed a two-year contract with Santa Clara of Primeira Liga.

== Career statistics ==
As of match played 20 September 2026

Appearances and goals by club, season and competition
Club	Season	League			State league		National cup (Note: Includes Copa do Brasil and Taça de Portugal)		League cup		Continental		Other		Total	
Club	Season	Division	Apps	Goals	Apps	Goals	Apps	Goals	Apps	Goals	Apps	Goals	Apps	Goals	Apps	Goals
Cruzeiro	2016	Série A	3	0	1 (Note: Appearance(s) in Campeonato Mineiro)	0	0	0	—		—		0	0	4	0
Cruzeiro	2017	Série A	0	0	0	0	1	0	—		0	0	2 (Note: Appearance(s) in Primeira Liga)	0	3	0
Cruzeiro	2018	Série A	0	0	0	0	0	0	—		0	0	—		0	0
Cruzeiro	2020	Série B	2	0	0	0	0	0	—		—		—		2	0
Cruzeiro	2021	Série B	2	0	1	0	0	0	—		—		—		3	0
Cruzeiro	Total		7	0	2	0	1	0	—		0	0	2	0	12	0
Nacional (loan)	2018–19	Primeira Liga	7	0	—		0	0	—		—		0	0	7	0
Ceará (loan)	2019	Série A	1	0	—		—		—		—		—		1	0
Guarani (loan)	2021	Série B	0	0	—		—		—		—		—		0	0
Nacional	2022–23	Liga Portugal 2	7	0	—		2	0	0	0	—		—		9	0
Nacional	2023–24	Liga Portugal 2	33	0	—		1	0	4 (Note: Appearance(s) in Taça da Liga)	0	—		—		38	0
Nacional	2024–25	Primeira Liga	33	0	—		0	0	1	0	—		—		34	0
Nacional	2025–26	Primeira Liga	6	0	—		1	0	0	0	—		—		7	0
Nacional	Total		79	0	—		4	0	5	0	—		—		88	0
Santa Clara	2026–27	Primeira Liga	7	0	—		0	0	0	0	—		—		7	0
Career total			101	0	2	0	5	0	5	0	0	0	2	0	115	0

== Honours ==
Individual

- Liga Portugal 2 Goalkeeper of the Month: October/November 2023
