= Francisco Gonçalves =

Portuguese footballer

Personal information
- Full name: Francisco Adriano Baptista Gonçalves
- Date of birth: 5 March 2004 (age 22)
- Place of birth: Funchal, Madeira, Portugal
- Height: 1.88 m (6 ft 2 in)
- Position: Centre-back

Team information
- Current team: Nacional
- Number: 33

Youth career
- 2013–2022: Nacional

Senior career*
Years	Team	Apps	(Gls)
2022–	Nacional	16	(0)
- * Club domestic league appearances and goals as of 25 May 2026

Francisco Adriano Baptista Gonçalves (born 5 March 2004) is a Portuguese professional footballer who plays as a centre-back for Primeira Liga club Nacional.

== Club career ==
=== Nacional ===
Gonçalves joined Nacional in 2013 and played for the youth teams. Gonçalves signed his first senior professional contract in 2022, aged 18, after being promoted to the senior squad on 31 May 2022. He made his professional senior debut in a Liga Portugal 2 match against Torreense on 13 August 2022, which ended in a 2–0 victory to Nacional. In the 2023–24 season, Gonçalves made a total of 10 appearances, 4 in the league, 2 in the Taça de Portugal and 4 in the Taça da Liga. On 27 February 2025, it was announced that Gonçalves signed a four year deal that runs until 2029 at the end of the 2028–29 season. Nacional gained promotion to the Primeira Liga after finished second in the 2023–24 season.

Gonçalves sustained injuries at the start of the 2024–25 season. He finally made his top-flight debut on 17 May 2025, in a 3–0 defeat against Porto.

== Career statistics ==
=== Club ===
As of match played 2 July 2025

Appearances and goals by club, season and competition
Club	Season	League			National cup (Note: Includes Taça de Portugal)		League cup (Note: Includes Taça da Liga)		Europe		Other		Total	
Club	Season	Division	Apps	Goals	Apps	Goals	Apps	Goals	Apps	Goals	Apps	Goals	Apps	Goals
Nacional	2022–23	Liga Portugal 2	1	0	0	0	0	0	—		—		1	0
Nacional	2023–24	Liga Portugal 2	4	0	2	0	4	0	—		—		10	0
Nacional	2024–25	Primeira Liga	1	0	0	0	0	0	—		—		1	0
Nacional	2025–26	Primeira Liga	0	0	0	0	0	0	—		—		0	0
Nacional	Total		6	0	2	0	4	0	0	0	0	0	12	0
Career total			6	0	2	0	4	0	0	0	0	0	12	0
