= Jesús Ramírez (Venezuelan footballer) =

Venezuelan footballer (born 1998)

Personal information
- Full name: Jesús Andrés Ramírez Díaz
- Date of birth: 4 May 1998 (age 28)
- Place of birth: Tovar, Mérida, Venezuela
- Height: 1.84 m (6 ft 0 in)
- Position: Striker

Team information
- Current team: Çorum
- Number: 19

Senior career*
Years	Team	Apps	(Gls)
2015–2016	Estudiantes de Mérida	12	(0)
2016–2018	Veracruz Premier	28	(3)
2019–2022	Coquimbo Unido	18	(5)
2020–2021	→ Audax Italiano (loan)	22	(2)
2021–2022	→ Atlético Morelia (loan)	40	(11)
2022–2024	Atlético Morelia	6	(1)
2022–2023	→ Marítimo (loan)	24	(2)
2023–2024	→ Nacional (loan)	33	(17)
2024–2025	Vitória de Guimarães	25	(3)
2025–2026	Nacional	33	(18)
2026–	Çorum	10	(6)

International career^{‡}
2024–	Venezuela	8	(2)
Medal record
Representing Venezuela
Men's football
FIFA Series
Runner-up	2026 Uzbekistan
- * Club domestic league appearances and goals as of 19 September 2026 ‡ National team caps and goals as of 2 October 2026

Jesús Andrés Ramírez Díaz (born 4 May 1998) is a Venezuelan footballer who plays as a striker for Süper Lig club Çorum and the Venezuela national team.

== Club career ==
He came to Chile after playing two years for Veracruz Premier until 2018, but he couldn't join Coquimbo Unido U19 on first half 2019 due to his age. On second half 2019, he joined the Pirates on a deal for three years. On 2020 season, he was loaned to Audax Italiano for one year. On second half 2021, he was loaned to Mexican club Atlético Morelia in the Liga de Expansión MX.

On 5 July 2025, it was announced that Ramírez had signed for Primeira Liga club Nacional until 2027.

== Career statistics ==
=== Club ===
As of match played 19 September 2026

Appearances and goals by club, season and competition
Club	Season	League			National cup (Note: Includes Taça de Portugal)		League cup (Note: Includes Taça da Liga)		Continental		Other		Total	
Club	Season	Division	Apps	Goals	Apps	Goals	Apps	Goals	Apps	Goals	Apps	Goals	Apps	Goals
Estudiantes de Mérida	2015	Liga FUTVE	6	0	0	0	—		—		—		6	0
Estudiantes de Mérida	2016	Liga FUTVE	6	0	0	0	—		—		—		6	0
Estudiantes de Mérida	Total		12	0	0	0	—		—		—		12	0
Veracruz Premier	2016–17	Liga Premier A	15	3	0	0	—		—		—		15	3
Veracruz Premier	2017–18	Liga Premier A	13	0	0	0	—		—		—		13	0
Veracruz Premier	Total		28	3	0	0	—		—		—		28	3
Coquimbo Unido	2019	Liga de Primera	9	2	0	0	—		—		—		9	2
Coquimbo Unido	2021	Liga de Primera	9	3	0	0	—		—		—		9	3
Coquimbo Unido	Total		18	5	0	0	—		—		—		18	5
Audax Italiano (loan)	2020	Liga de Primera	22	2	—		—		2 (Note: Appearances in Copa Sudamericana)	1	—		24	3
Atlético Morelia (loan)	2021–22	Liga MX	40	11	—		—		—		—		40	11
Atlético Morelia	2022–23	Liga MX	4	1	—		—		—		—		4	1
Atlético Morelia	2023–24	Liga MX	2	0	—		—		—		—		2	0
Atlético Morelia	Total		6	1	—		—		—		6	1		
Marítimo (loan)	2022–23	Primeira Liga	22	1	1	0	1	0	—		2 (Note: Appearances in Primeira Liga relegation play-offs)	1	26	2
Nacional (loan)	2023–24	Liga Portugal 2	33	17	4	3	2	0	—		—		39	20
Vitória SC	2024–25	Primeira Liga	25	3	3	0	1	0	11 (Note: Appearances in UEFA Conference League)	1	—		40	4
Nacional	2025–26	Primeira Liga	33	18	1	1	—		—		—		34	19
Çorum	2026–27	Süper Lig	6	4	0	0	—		—		—		6	4
career total			245	65	9	4	4	0	13	2	2	1	273	72

=== International ===
As of match played 2 October 2026

Appearances and goals by national team and year
National team	Year	Apps	Goals
Venezuela	2024	1	0
Venezuela	2025	2	1
Venezuela	2026	5	1
Total		8	2

==== International goals ====
List of international goals scored by Jesús Ramírez
No.	Date	Venue	Opponent	Score	Result	Competition
1.	15 November 2025	Shell Energy Stadium, Houston, United States	Australia	1–0	1–0	Friendly
2.	9 June 2026	SeatGeek Stadium, Bridgeview, United States	Iraq	2–0	2–0	Friendly

== Honours ==
Venezuela

- FIFA Series runner-up: 2026
