= Martim Gustavo =

Portuguese footballer

Personal information
- Full name: Martim Gustavo Silva Watts Rodrigues
- Date of birth: 14 July 2005 (age 21)
- Place of birth: Funchal, Madeira, Portugal
- Height: 1.84 m (6 ft 0 in)
- Positions: Attacking midfielder; winger

Team information
- Current team: Nacional
- Number: 30

Youth career
- 2015–2019: Nacional
- 2019–2020: Porto
- 2020–2021: Padroense
- 2021–2022: Nacional

Senior career*
| Years | Team | Apps | (Gls) |
| 2022–2024 | Nacional | 3 | (0) |
| 2024–2025 | Estoril | 0 | (0) |
| 2025– | Nacional | 7 | (0) |
- * Club domestic league appearances and goals as of 25 May 2026

Martim Gustavo Silva Watts Rodrigues (born 14 July 2005), known as Martim Gustavo, is a Portuguese professional footballer who plays as an attacking midfielder or winger for Primeira Liga club Nacional.

== Club career ==
=== Early career ===
Martim Gustavo signed for Nacional from 2015 to 2019. He then made the switch to Porto's youth team from 2019 to 2020. He scored a total of five goals in eight matches. He then signed for Padroense from 2020 to 2021.

=== Nacional ===
Gustavo returned to Nacional in 2021. He made his professional senior debut in a Liga Portugal 2 match against Torreense on 13 August 2022, which ended in a 2–0 victory. In the 2023–24 season, he made a total of 5 appearances, 2 in the league, 1 in the Taça de Portugal and 2 in the Taça da Liga. Nacional gained promotion to the Primeira Liga after finishing second in the season.

On his 19th birthday in 2024, Gustavo signed a three-year contract extension.

=== Estoril ===
Martim Gustavo made the switch to Primeira Liga club Estoril for the 2024–25 season. He featured only for the under-23 side in the Liga Revelação, making a total of 19 appearances, scoring 3 goals.

=== Nacional ===
On 2 July 2025, Martim Gustavo signed a three-year contract with Nacional ahead of the 2025–26 season.

== International career ==
Gustavo was called up to the Portugal under-18 for the centralised training held in April 2023.

== Career statistics ==
=== Club ===
As of match played 2 July 2025

Appearances and goals by club, season and competition
| Club | Season | League | | | National cup (Note: Includes Taça de Portugal) | | League cup (Note: Includes Taça da Liga) | | Europe | | Other | | Total | |
| Club | Season | Division | Apps | Goals | Apps | Goals | Apps | Goals | Apps | Goals | Apps | Goals | Apps | Goals |
|---|---|---|---|---|---|---|---|---|---|---|---|---|---|---|
| Nacional | 2022–23 | Liga Portugal 2 | 1 | 0 | 0 | 0 | 0 | 0 | — | | — | | 1 | 0 |
| Nacional | 2023–24 | Liga Portugal 2 | 2 | 0 | 1 | 0 | 2 | 0 | — | | — | | 5 | 0 |
| Nacional | Total | | 3 | 0 | 1 | 0 | 2 | 0 | 0 | 0 | 0 | 0 | 6 | 0 |
| Estoril | 2024–25 | Primeira Liga | 0 | 0 | 0 | 0 | 0 | 0 | — | | — | | 0 | 0 |
| Nacional | 2025–26 | Primeira Liga | 0 | 0 | 0 | 0 | 0 | 0 | — | | — | | 0 | 0 |
| Career total | | | 3 | 0 | 1 | 0 | 2 | 0 | 0 | 0 | 0 | 0 | 6 | 0 |
