= Bruno Gomes (footballer, born 1996) =

Brazilian footballer

Personal information
- Full name: Bruno Gomes de Oliveira Conceição
- Date of birth: 19 July 1996 (age 30)
- Place of birth: São Paulo, Brazil
- Height: 1.82 m (6 ft 0 in)
- Position: Forward

Team information
- Current team: Valletta

Youth career
- Desportivo Brasil
- 2013–2015: Internacional

Senior career*
Years	Team	Apps	(Gls)
2015–2017	Internacional	0	(0)
2015–2016	→ Genoa (loan)	0	(0)
2016–2017	→ Estoril (loan)	23	(3)
2017–2019	Estoril	21	(1)
2018	→ Vitória (loan)	0	(0)
2018–2019	→ Aves (loan)	11	(0)
2019–2020	Modena	6	(0)
2020–2021	Paraná	28	(6)
2021–2023	Nacional	37	(5)
2023–2024	Vllaznia Shkodër	15	(0)
2025	Semen Padang	28	(10)
2026	Persis Solo	12	(4)
2026–	Valletta	0	(0)
- * Club domestic league appearances and goals as of 23 May 2026

Bruno Gomes de Oliveira Conceição (born 19 July 1996) is a Brazilian professional footballer who plays as a forward for Maltese Premier League club Valletta.

== Club career ==
=== Internacional ===
Following a string of impressive performances at youth level with Desportivo Brasil, during which time he scored more than 130 goals and won three consecutive age-group Golden Boot awards, Gomes was signed by Internacional in 2013. Prior to signing for the Brazilian Série A side he had previously undergone a trial at Premier League club Manchester United in 2012. In 2014, he was part of the Inter side which won the Campeonato Brasileiro Sub-20.

==== Loan to Genoa ====
In September 2015, Gomes underwent a medical Serie A side Genoa but his move from Internacional was denied by FIFA as the documentation required for the transfer to go through failed to arrive on time. Having trained with the club in the interim, Gomes' signing was finally confirmed on 5 January 2016 on a six-month loan deal, with Genoa reserving the option to buy.

In May 2016, having failed to make a single senior appearance for the club during his loan spell, Gomes returned to Brazil pending a decision by Genoa as to whether or not to sign him permanently.

=== Estoril ===
At the end of the Serie A season, Gomes returned to Internacional, having failed to feature for the first team during his loan spell at Genoa. Genoa subsequently opted against exercising their option to sign him permanently and on 22 July 2016, he was loaned to Portuguese Primeira Liga side Estoril for the 2016–17 season.

Gomes made his Primeira Liga debut on 11 September, coming on as a second-half substitute for Kléber in a 0–0 draw with Paços de Ferreira. On 23 September he scored the first professional goals of his career, coming off the bench to net a brace in a 4–2 loss to Sporting CP.

Gomes scored his first cup goal two months later on 19 November, netting in stoppage-time in a 2–0 Taça de Portugal victory over Cova da Piedade. He followed the goal up with braces against Sanjoanense and Benfica, though the latter was not enough to prevent Estoril from being knocked out of the tournament in the semi-finals. In total, he amassed 28 appearances for the season and scored eight goals.

In August 2017, Gomes terminated his contract with Internacional in order to sign with Estoril permanently. Internacional approached FIFA with an appeal following his move, claiming that they had rejected both a transfer offer from Estoril, and a request from the player for the rescision and that he was still contracted to the club. Despite Internacional's contestations, Estoril registered Gomes for the season on 31 August. He ultimately made 21 appearances for the season, scoring once.

==== Loan to Vitória and Aves ====
On 10 July 2018, Gomes returned to Brazil, where he joined Vitória on a season-long loan. He departed the following month, however, having not played a single match, to join Portuguese side Aves on loan instead.

=== Modena ===
On 22 November 2019, he returned to Italy, joining Serie C club Modena.

=== Nacional ===
On 1 July 2021, he signed a three-year contract with Liga Portugal 2 side Nacional.

=== Vllaznia Shkodër ===
On 28 August 2023, Albanian Kategoria Superiore club Vllaznia Shkodër announced the signing of Gomes on a one-year contract, with an option for a further year.

=== Semen Padang ===
On 5 January 2025, Gomes signed a contract with Liga 1 club Semen Padang until the end of the second round of the 2024–25 Liga 1.

== Style of play ==
Due to his pace and explosiveness, Gomes was dubbed "the new Pato" by Brazilian media during the early stages of his career in comparison to fellow Brazilian forward Alexandre Pato. He plays predominantly as a striker or secondary striker, but he is also adept at playing down the left wing.

== Career statistics ==
=== Club ===
As of match played 23 May 2026

Appearances and goals by club, season and competition
Club	Season	League			National cup (Note: Includes Taça de Portugal and Copa do Brasil)		League cup (Note: Includes Taça da Liga)		Total	
Club	Season	Division	Apps	Goals	Apps	Goals	Apps	Goals	Apps	Goals
Internacional	2015	Série A	0	0	0	0	—		0	0
Genoa (loan)	2015–16	Serie A	0	0	0	0	—		0	0
Estoril (loan)	2016–17	Primeira Liga	23	3	4	5	1	0	28	8
Estoril	2017–18	Primeira Liga	21	1	0	0	0	0	21	1
Estoril	Total		44	4	4	5	1	0	49	9
Vitória (loan)	2018	Série A	0	0	0	0	—		0	0
Aves (loan)	2018–19	Primeira Liga	11	0	1	0	1	0	13	0
Modena	2019–20	Serie C	6	0	0	0	—		6	0
Paraná	2020	Série B	28	6	1	0	—		29	6
Nacional	2021–22	Liga Portugal 2	16	3	0	0	1	0	17	3
Nacional	2022–23	Liga Portugal 2	21	2	4	2	3	1	28	5
Nacional	Total		37	5	4	2	4	1	45	8
Vllaznia Shkodër	2023–24	Kategoria Superiore	15	0	3	3	—		18	3
Semen Padang	2024–25	Liga 1	17	8	0	0	—		17	8
Semen Padang	2025–26	Liga 1	11	2	0	0	—		11	2
Persis Solo	2025–26	Super League	12	4	0	0	—		12	4
Career total			166	28	10	7	6	1	182	36
