= José Gomes (footballer, born 1996) =

Portuguese footballer

Personal information
- Full name: José Manuel Mendes Gomes
- Date of birth: 20 July 1996 (age 30)
- Place of birth: Arco De Baúlhe, Portugal
- Height: 1.85 m (6 ft 1 in)
- Position: Left back

Team information
- Current team: Nacional
- Number: 5

Youth career
- 2007–2009: Futsal
- 2009–2010: Cabeceirense
- 2010–2011: Futsal
- 2011–2014: Braga

Senior career*
Years	Team	Apps	(Gls)
2014–2017	Braga B	18	(0)
2017–2019	Penafiel	43	(0)
2019–2021	Chaves	30	(0)
2021–	Nacional	119	(8)

International career
2013	Portugal U17	3	(0)
2014	Portugal U18	2	(0)
2015	Portugal U19	1	(0)
2016	Portugal U20	2	(0)
- * Club domestic league appearances and goals as of 25 May 2026

José Manuel Mendes Gomes (born 20 June 1996) is a Portuguese professional footballer who plays as a left-back for Primeira Liga club Nacional.

== Club career ==
Born in Cabeceiras de Basto, Braga District, Gomes completed his development at local S.C. Braga. He made his professional debut for the reserve team on 24 August 2014 in a 2–1 loss at G.D. Chaves in the Segunda Liga, as a half-time substitute for Núrio Fortuna. On 5 October, he was sent off in a game of the same result at U.D. Oliveirense. He made his only first-team appearance the following 4 February in a dead rubber Taça da Liga group match, a 2–0 win away to Rio Ave F.C. as a late replacement.

In June 2017, Gomes moved to F.C. Penafiel also in the second division. He received two straight red cards in his first months at the club, both given out before half time.

Free agent Gomes left for Chaves, newly relegated from the Primeira Liga, in June 2019. Once his two-year deal had expired, he signed for three seasons at C.D. Nacional.

== Career statistics ==
=== Club ===
As of match played 29 November 2025

Club	Season	League			National cup		League cup		Other		Total	
Club	Season	Division	Apps	Goals	Apps	Goals	Apps	Goals	Apps	Goals	Apps	Goals
Braga B	2014–15	Segunda Liga	4	0	—		—		—		4	0
Braga B	2015–16	LigaPro	3	0	—		—		—		3	0
Braga B	2016–17	LigaPro	1	0	—		—		—		1	0
Braga B	Total		8	0	—		—		—		8	0
Braga	2014–15	Primeira Liga	0	0	0	0	1	0	—		1	0
Penafiel	2017–18	LigaPro	26	0	0	0	0	0	—		26	0
Penafiel	2018–19	LigaPro	17	0	0	0	0	0	—		17	0
Penafiel	Total		43	0	0	0	0	0	—		43	0
Chaves	2019–20	LigaPro	17	0	2	0	2	0	—		21	0
Chaves	2020–21	Liga Portugal 2	13	0	0	0	0	0	—		13	0
Chaves	Total		30	0	2	0	2	0	—		34	0
Nacional	2021–22	Liga Portugal 2	17	1	0	0	1	0	—		18	1
Nacional	2022–23	Liga Portugal 2	24	0	5	0	2	0	—		31	0
Nacional	2023–24	Liga Portugal 2	23	3	3	0	1	1	—		27	4
Nacional	2024–25	Primeira Liga	28	3	0	0	1	0	—		29	3
Nacional	2025–26	Primeira Liga	12	1	1	0	0	0	—		13	1
Nacional	Total		104	8	9	0	5	1	—		118	9
Career total			185	8	11	0	7	1	0	0	203	9
