= Josué (footballer, born 2005) =

Brazilian footballer

Personal information
- Full name: Josué Souza dos Santos
- Date of birth: 25 April 2005 (age 21)
- Place of birth: Nova Iguaçu, Brazil
- Height: 1.70 m (5 ft 7 in)
- Position: Defensive midfielder

Team information
- Current team: Nacional

Youth career
- 2021: Serrano-RJ
- 2021: America-RJ
- 2021–: Grêmio

Senior career*
Years	Team	Apps	(Gls)
2023–2025	Grêmio	4	(0)
2024	→ Houston Dynamo 2 (loan)	11	(0)
2025–	Nacional	0	(0)
2026	→ Democrata GV (loan)	5	(0)
- * Club domestic league appearances and goals as of 29 June 2026

Josué Souza dos Santos (born 25 April 2005), simply known as Josué, is a Brazilian professional footballer who plays as a defensive midfielder for Primeira Liga club Nacional.

== Career ==
=== First years ===
Born in Nova Iguaçu, Rio de Janeiro, Josué joined Grêmio's youth setup in 2021, after representing America-RJ and Serrano-RJ. On 24 August 2022, he signed his first professional contract with the club, agreeing to a deal until 2025.

Josué made his first team – and Série A – debut on 18 October 2023, coming on as a second-half substitute for Nathan in a 2–1 home loss to Athletico Paranaense.

=== Nacional ===
On 10 July 2025, it was announced that Josué had signed for Primeira Liga club Nacional until 2030.

==== Democrata GV (loan) ====
In January 2026, after struggling for game-time in Portugal under manager Tiago Margarido, Josué returned to Brazil, joining Democrata GV on loan until the end of the year.

== Career statistics ==
As of 28 October 2023

Appearances and goals by club, season and competition
Club	Season	League			State League		National Cup		Continental		Other		Total	
Club	Season	Division	Apps	Goals	Apps	Goals	Apps	Goals	Apps	Goals	Apps	Goals	Apps	Goals
Grêmio	2023	Série A	2	0	—		—		—		—		2	0
Career total			2	0	0	0	0	0	0	0	0	0	2	0
