= Daniel Júnior =

Brazilian footballer (born 2002)

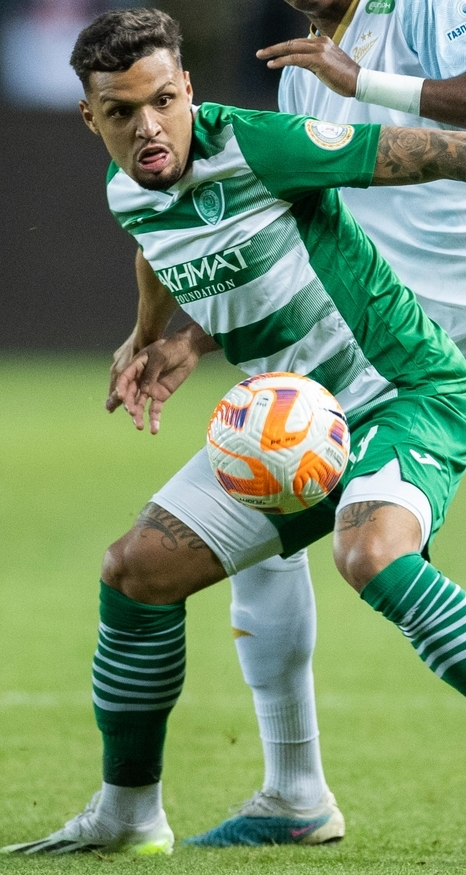
- Daniel Júnior playing for Akhmat Grozny in 2023

Personal information
- Full name: Daniel de Melo Araújo Júnior
- Date of birth: 9 May 2002 (age 24)
- Place of birth: Santo André, Brazil
- Height: 1.77 m (5 ft 9 1/2 in)
- Position: Attacking midfielder

Team information
- Current team: Nacional
- Number: 10

Youth career
- 2015–2021: Palmeiras
- 2021–2022: Cruzeiro

Senior career*
Years	Team	Apps	(Gls)
2022–2024	Cruzeiro	45	(5)
2023–2024	→ Akhmat Grozny (loan)	4	(0)
2024–2025	Vitória	8	(1)
2024	→ América Mineiro (loan)	9	(1)
2025	→ Portuguesa (loan)	5	(0)
2025–	Nacional	17	(0)
- * Club domestic league appearances and goals as of 25 May 2026

Daniel de Melo Araújo Júnior (born 9 May 2002), known as Daniel Júnior, is a Brazilian professional footballer who plays as an attacking midfielder for Primeira Liga club Nacional.

== Career ==
=== Early career ===
Born in Santo André, São Paulo, Daniel Júnior began his career with Palmeiras, signing his first professional contract with the club on 6 September 2019. On 20 March 2021, however, after failing to make his breakthrough in the under-20 team, he rescinded his link, and joined Cruzeiro on 11 May.

=== Cruzeiro ===
After impressing with the under-20s, Daniel Júnior made his first team debut with the Raposa on 5 February 2022, coming on as a late substitute for Matheus Bidu in a 2–1 Campeonato Mineiro away win over Caldense. He scored his first goal for the club seven days later, netting the opener in a 3–0 success at Tombense.

Daniel Júnior became a starter under head coach Paulo Pezzolano, but was sent back to the under-20 squad in May 2022, after failing to sign a new contract. On 26 May, he returned to the first team after signing a new deal until 2025.

After Pezzolano's departure, Daniel Júnior had limited playing time under new head coach Pepa.

==== Loan to Akhmat Grozny ====
On 11 September 2023, Daniel Júnior joined Russian Premier League club Akhmat Grozny on loan with an option to buy. He made his debut abroad twelve days later, replacing compatriot Camilo in a 1–0 away loss to Baltika Kaliningrad.

Daniel Júnior officially left Akhmat by mutual consent on 9 February 2024.

=== Vitória ===
In February 2024, Daniel Júnior signed a three-year deal with Vitória for a rumoured fee of US$ 500,000. However, he failed to establish himself as a regular unit at the club.

==== Loan to América Mineiro ====
On 7 August 2024, Daniel Júnior was announced at América Mineiro on loan until the end of the year. He left the club in December, after a loan extension was not agreed.

==== Loan to Portuguesa ====
On 3 January 2025, Portuguesa announced the signing of Daniel Júnior on loan.

=== Nacional ===
On 27 August 2025, it was announced that Daniel had signed for Primeira Liga club Nacional for five seasons.

== Career statistics ==
As of 30 January 2025

Appearances and goals by club, season and competition
Club	Season	League			State league (Note: Includes Campeonato Mineiro, Campeonato Baiano, Campeonato Paulista)		Cup (Note: Includes Copa do Brasil, Russian Cup)		Continental		Other		Total	
Club	Season	Division	Apps	Goals	Apps	Goals	Apps	Goals	Apps	Goals	Apps	Goals	Apps	Goals
Cruzeiro	2022	Série B	25	2	10	2	3	0	—		—		38	4
Cruzeiro	2023	Série A	4	0	6	1	1	0	—		—		11	1
Cruzeiro	Total		29	2	16	3	4	0	—		—		49	5
Akhmat Grozny (loan)	2023–24	Russian Premier League	4	0	—		3	0	—		—		7	0
Vitória	2024	Série A	5	0	3	1	1	1	—		3 (Note: Appearance(s) in Copa do Nordeste)	1	12	3
América Mineiro (loan)	2024	Série B	9	1	—		—		—		—		9	1
Portuguesa (loan)	2025	Série D	0	0	5	0	0	0	—		—		5	0
Nacional	2025–26	Primeira Liga	0	0	0	0	0	0	—		—		0	0
Career total			47	3	24	4	8	1	0	0	3	1	82	9

== Honours ==
Cruzeiro

- Campeonato Brasileiro Série B: 2022
