= Zé Vitor (footballer, born 2001) =

Brazilian footballer

Personal information
- Full name: José Vitor Lima Cardoso
- Date of birth: 9 February 2001 (age 25)
- Place of birth: Goiana, Brazil
- Height: 1.89 m (6 ft 2 in)
- Position: Centre back

Team information
- Current team: Nacional
- Number: 38

Youth career
- Betim
- 2019–2021: América Mineiro

Senior career*
Years	Team	Apps	(Gls)
2021–2022	América Mineiro	6	(0)
2022	Bahia	0	(0)
2023–2024	Tombense	25	(4)
2024–	Nacional	61	(6)
- * Club domestic league appearances and goals as of 25 May 2026

José Vitor Lima Cardoso (born 9 February 2001), commonly known as Zé Vitor, is a Brazilian professional footballer who plays as a central defender for Primeira Liga club Nacional.

== Club career ==
Born in Goiana, Pernambuco, Zé Vitor joined América Mineiro's youth setup in 2019, from Betim Futebol. He made his first team – and Série A – debut on 10 July 2021, starting in a 0–1 home loss against Atlético Mineiro.

== Career statistics ==
As of match played 7 December 2025

Club	Season	League			State league		National cup (Note: Includes Copa do Brasil and Taça de Portugal)		Other		Total	
Club	Season	Division	Apps	Goals	Apps	Goals	Apps	Goals	Apps	Goals	Apps	Goals
América Mineiro	2021	Série A	3	0	0	0	0	0	—		3	0
América Mineiro	2022	Série A	0	0	3 (Note: Appearance(s) in Campeonato Mineiro)	0	0	0	0	0	3	0
América Mineiro	Total		3	0	3	0	0	0	0	0	6	0
Bahia	2022	Série B	0	0	0	0	1	0	—		1	0
Tombense	2023	Série B	13	2	4	0	1	0	—		18	2
Tombense	2024	Série C	0	0	8	2	0	0	—		8	2
Tombense	Total		13	2	12	2	1	0	—		26	4
Nacional	2024–25	Primeira Liga	31	2	—		1	0	1 (Note: Appearance(s) in Taça da Liga)	0	33	2
Nacional	2025–26	Primeira Liga	11	1	—		2	0	0	0	13	1
Nacional	Total		42	3	—		3	0	1	0	46	3
Career total			58	5	15	2	5	0	1	0	79	7
