= Matheus Dias =

Brazilian footballer

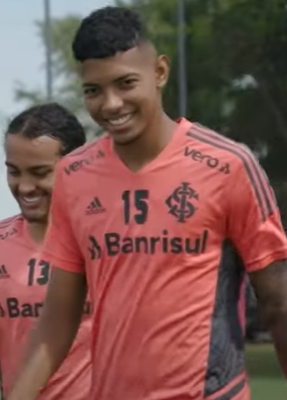

Personal information
- Full name: Matheus dos Santos Dias
- Date of birth: 9 May 2002 (age 24)
- Place of birth: São Paulo, Brazil
- Height: 1.87 m (6 ft 2 in)
- Position: Midfielder

Team information
- Current team: Nacional
- Number: 6

Youth career
- Tombense
- 2021–2022: → Internacional (loan)
- 2022: Internacional

Senior career*
Years	Team	Apps	(Gls)
2022	Tombense	0	(0)
2022	→ Internacional (loan)	1	(0)
2022–2025	Internacional	27	(0)
2024–2025	→ Nacional (loan)	26	(0)
2025–	Nacional	31	(0)

International career
2023	Brazil U23	4	(0)
Medal record
Men's football
Representing Brazil
Pan American Games
Winner	2023 Santiago
- * Club domestic league appearances and goals as of 25 May 2026

Matheus dos Santos Dias (born 9 May 2002), known as Matheus Dias, is a Brazilian professional footballer who plays as a midfielder for Primeira Liga club Nacional.

== Club career ==
Born in São Paulo, Matheus Dias joined Internacional's youth setup in 2021, on loan from Tombense. On 21 December of that year, he was promoted to the first team for the upcoming season.

Matheus Dias made his first team debut on 2 February 2022, coming on as a late substitute for Andrés D'Alessandro in a 0–0 Campeonato Gaúcho away draw against São Luiz. On 28 April, the club exercised his buyout clause, paying R$ 500,000 for 60% of his economic rights.

Matheus Dias made his Série A debut on 8 November 2022, replacing Johnny Cardoso in a 1–0 away win over São Paulo. The following 6 February, he renewed his contract until the end of 2027.

Dias joined Nacional on loan on 1 August 2024.

=== Nacional ===
On 11 July 2025, it was announced that Dias had signed a permanent deal with Nacional, with the contract lasting until 2030.

== Career statistics ==
=== Club ===
As of match played 7 December 2025

Appearances and goals by club, season and competition
Club	Season	League			State league		National cup (Note: Includes Copa do Brasil and Taça de Portugal)		Continental		Other		Total	
Club	Season	Division	Apps	Goals	Apps	Goals	Apps	Goals	Apps	Goals	Apps	Goals	Apps	Goals
Internacional	2022	Série A	2	0	1 (Note: Appearance(s) in Campeonato Gaúcho)	0	0	0	0	0	—		3	0
Internacional	2023	Série A	14	0	8	0	3	0	3 (Note: Appearance(s) in Copa Libertadores)	0	—		28	0
Internacional	2024	Série A	3	0	0	0	0	0	0	0	—		3	0
Internacional	2025	Série A	0	0	0	0	0	0	0	0	—		0	0
Internacional	Total		19	0	9	0	3	0	3	0	—		34	0
Nacional (loan)	2024–25	Primeira Liga	26	0	—		1	1	—		1 (Note: Appearance(s) in Taça da Liga)	0	28	1
Nacional	2025–26	Primeira Liga	12	0	—		1	0	—		0	0	13	0
Career total			57	0	9	0	5	1	3	0	1	0	75	1

== Honours ==
Brasil U23

- Pan American Games: 2023
