= Gustavo Garcia (footballer, born 2002) =

Brazilian footballer

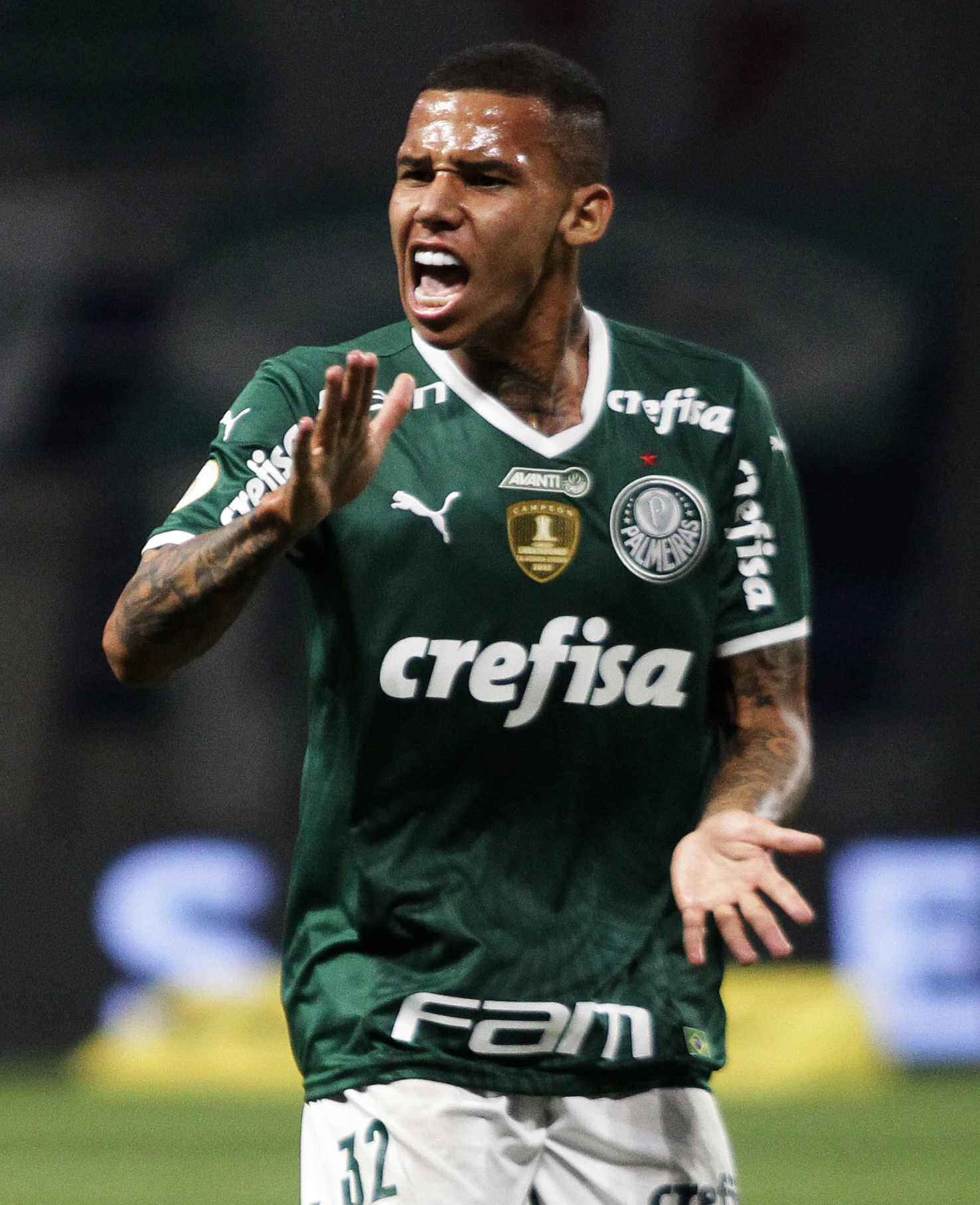
- Garcia playing for Palmeiras in 2022

Personal information
- Full name: Gustavo Garcia dos Santos
- Date of birth: 4 January 2002 (age 24)
- Place of birth: São Paulo, Brasil
- Height: 1.69 m (5 ft 7 in)
- Position: Right-back

Team information
- Current team: Famalicão
- Number: 2

Youth career
- –2013: Portuguesa
- 2013–2021: Palmeiras

Senior career*
Years	Team	Apps	(Gls)
2021–2025	Palmeiras	28	(0)
2024–2025	→ Nacional (loan)	33	(0)
2025–	Famalicão	12	(0)

International career^{‡}
2017–2018	Brazil U16	7	(1)
2018–2019	Brazil U17	13	(0)
- * Club domestic league appearances and goals as of 25 May 2026 ‡ National team caps and goals as of 03:39, 11 March 2021 (UTC)

Gustavo Garcia dos Santos (born 4 January 2002) is a Brazilian professional footballer who plays as a right-back for Primeira Liga club Famalicão.

== Club career ==
In July 2024, Garcia left Brazil for the first time in his career to join Primeira Liga side Nacional on loan until the end of the season.

On 6 July 2025, Garcia signed a four-year contract with Primeira Liga club Famalicão.

== Career statistics ==
=== Club ===
As of match played 18 October 2025

Appearances and goals by club, season and competition
Club	Season	League			State league		National cup (Note: Includes Taça de Portugal)		Continental		Other		Total	
Club	Season	Division	Apps	Goals	Apps	Goals	Apps	Goals	Apps	Goals	Apps	Goals	Apps	Goals
Palmeiras	2021	Série A	3	0	8 (Note: Appearance(s) in Campeonato Paulista)	0	0	0	0	0	0	0	11	0
Palmeiras	2022	Série A	4	0	1	0	0	0	0	0	—		5	0
Palmeiras	2023	Série A	5	0	3	0	0	0	3 (Note: Appearance(s) in Copa Libertadores)	0	0	0	11	0
Palmeiras	2024	Série A	2	0	2	0	0	0	1	0	0	0	5	0
Palmeiras	Total		14	0	14	0	0	0	4	0	0	0	32	0
Nacional (loan)	2024–25	Primeira Liga	33	0	—		0	0	—		0	0	33	0
Famalicão	2025–26	Primeira Liga	2	0	—		1	0	—		—		3	0
Career Total			49	0	14	0	1	0	4	0	0	0	68	0

== Honours ==
Palmeiras

- Copa Libertadores: 2021
- Campeonato Paulista: 2023
- Campeonato Brasileiro Série A: 2023
