= Serginho (footballer, born 1972) =

Brazilian footballer

Personal information
- Full name: Sérgio Eduardo Ferreira da Cunha
- Date of birth: 15 October 1972 (age 54)
- Place of birth: Rio de Janeiro, Brazil
- Height: 1.77 m (5 ft 10 in)
- Position: Striker

Senior career*
Years	Team	Apps	(Gls)
1989	Portuguesa-RJ		
1990	Olaria		
1991	América		
1991–1993	Vitória	3	(0)
1993–1994	Al-Shoalah		
1994–2005	Nacional	279	(115)
2004	→ Juventude (loan)	3	(0)
2004–2005	→ União Madeira (loan)	17	(10)
2005	União Madeira	9	(0)
2006	Santana		
2007	Estácio Sá		

International career
1991	Brazil U20	1	(0)
- * Club domestic league appearances and goals

Sérgio Eduardo Ferreira da Cunha (born 15 October 1972 in Rio de Janeiro), known as Serginho, is a Brazilian retired footballer who played as a striker.

== Club career ==
After playing in his country mostly for modest clubs – he represented Associação Atlética Portuguesa (RJ), Olaria Atlético Clube, América Football Club, Vitória Futebol Clube (ES) – Serginho moved at almost 22 to Portugal with C.D. Nacional, being an instrumental part in the Madeira side's rise from the third and second divisions, eventually consolidating in the Primeira Liga.

In 2003–04, already slowing down, Serginho still scored two goals in 19 games as Nacional qualified for the first time ever to the UEFA Cup. He then moved to the lower leagues both in his country (Esporte Clube Juventude, Universidade Estácio de Sá Futebol Clube) and Portugal (C.F. União and U.D. Santana), before retiring in 2007 at the age of 35; he was Nacional's all-time top scorer, having netted well over 100 times in competitive matches.

== International career ==
Serginho represented Brazil's under-20s at the 1991 FIFA World Youth Championship in Portugal, but appeared only once for the eventual losing finalists, featuring 15 minutes in the 5–1 quarter-final win against South Korea.
