= Rúben Macedo =

Portuguese footballer

Personal information
- Full name: Rúben Daniel Fonseca Macedo
- Date of birth: 9 March 1996 (age 30)
- Place of birth: Amarante, Portugal
- Height: 1.70 m (5 ft 7 in)
- Position: Winger

Team information
- Current team: Gimhae
- Number: 96

Youth career
- 2004–2007: Amarante
- 2007–2015: Porto
- 2011–2012: → Padroense (loan)

Senior career*
Years	Team	Apps	(Gls)
2015–2019	Porto B	86	(11)
2018	→ Varzim (loan)	19	(5)
2019	→ Chaves (loan)	12	(0)
2019–2020	Aves	21	(1)
2020	Marítimo B	2	(1)
2020–2022	Marítimo	24	(0)
2022–2025	Nacional	101	(4)
2025–2026	Gyeongnam	15	(0)
2026–	Gimhae	3	(0)

International career
2011	Portugal U15	2	(0)
2011–2012	Portugal U16	14	(3)
2012–2013	Portugal U17	12	(7)
2013–2014	Portugal U18	7	(1)
2015	Portugal U19	6	(0)
2016	Portugal U20	6	(0)
- * Club domestic league appearances and goals as of 02:02, 17 August 2026 (UTC)

Rúben Daniel Fonseca Macedo (born 9 March 1996) is a Portuguese professional footballer who plays as a winger for K League 2 club Gimhae.

== Club career ==
=== Porto ===
Born in Amarante, Porto District of Swiss descent, Macedo joined FC Porto's academy at the age of 11. On 1 February 2015, still a junior, he made his professional debut with the B side, coming on as a late substitute for Frédéric Maciel in a 4–0 home win against S.C. Covilhã in the Segunda Liga. On 3 October that year, the week after finding the net against Chelsea in the UEFA Youth League (3–3 group stage home draw), he scored his first league goal, helping the visitors defeat S.C. Olhanense 2–0.

Macedo contributed 34 matches (14 starts) and four goals in the 2015–16 season, as his team became the first reserve one to win the second division championship. On 3 January 2018, he was loaned to Varzim S.C. in the same league, reuniting with his former coach Capucho.

On 12 June 2018, Macedo renewed his contract with Porto until 2020. In December, he went on loan to G.D. Chaves of the Primeira Liga. His maiden appearance in the competition took place on 13 January 2019, when he started the 2–1 victory over C.D. Tondela.

=== Aves ===
Deemed surplus to requirements by manager Sérgio Conceição, Macedo left the Estádio do Dragão and signed a three-year contract with C.D. Aves on 4 July 2019. He scored his only goal for the bottom-placed team on 18 August, in the 3–1 home defeat of C.S. Marítimo.

=== Marítimo ===
On 18 August 2020, Macedo joined Marítimo on a two-year deal. The following 22 February, he gave away an injury-time penalty against his former club Porto – who won 2–1 as a result of that action, after Otávio converted it– being subsequently subjected to abuse on his social media.

=== Nacional ===
Macedo remained in the island of Madeira in the second half of the 2021–22 campaign, signing a contract with second-tier C.D. Nacional running until June 2024. In 2023–24, he scored twice from 33 appearances in a promotion as runners-up.

During his tenure, Macedo totalled 117 games, seven goals and seven assists.

== Career statistics ==
As of 19 May 2024

Club	Season	League			Cup		Other		Total	
Club	Season	Division	Apps	Goals	Apps	Goals	Apps	Goals	Apps	Goals
Porto B	2014–15	Liga Portugal 2	6	0	—		—		6	0
Porto B	2015–16	Liga Portugal 2	34	4	—		—		34	4
Porto B	2016–17	Liga Portugal 2	29	2	—		—		29	2
Porto B	2017–18	Liga Portugal 2	5	0	—		—		5	0
Porto B	2018–19	Liga Portugal 2	12	5	—		—		12	5
Porto B	Total		86	11	—		—		86	11
Varzim (loan)	2017–18	Liga Portugal 2	19	5	—		—		19	5
Chaves (loan)	2018–19	Primeira Liga	12	0	—		—		12	0
Aves	2019–20	Primeira Liga	21	1	—		1 (Note: Appearances in Taça da Liga)	0	22	1
Marítimo B	2020–21	Campeonato de Portugal	2	1	—		—		2	1
Marítimo	2020–21	Primeira Liga	18	0	2	0	—		20	0
Marítimo	2021–22	Primeira Liga	6	0	1	0	1	0	8	0
Marítimo	Total		24	0	3	0	1	0	28	0
Nacional	2021–22	Liga Portugal 2	10	0	—		—		10	0
Nacional	2022–23	Liga Portugal 2	31	1	6	0	2	0	39	1
Nacional	2023–24	Liga Portugal 2	33	2	4	0	2	0	39	2
Nacional	Total		74	3	10	0	4	0	88	3
Career Total			238	21	13	0	6	0	257	21
