= João Aurélio =

Portuguese footballer (born 1988)

Personal information
- Full name: João Miguel Coimbra Aurélio
- Date of birth: 17 August 1988 (age 38)
- Place of birth: Beja, Portugal
- Height: 1.82 m (6 ft 0 in)
- Positions: Right-back; midfielder

Youth career
- 1996–2002: Desportivo Beja
- 2002–2005: Despertar
- 2005–2007: Vitória Guimarães

Senior career*
Years	Team	Apps	(Gls)
2007–2008	Penalva	34	(5)
2008–2016	Nacional	186	(6)
2016–2018	Vitória Guimarães	47	(0)
2018–2020	Moreirense	50	(4)
2020–2022	Pafos	56	(1)
2022–2026	Nacional	91	(2)
Total		464	(18)

International career
2008	Portugal U20	6	(2)
2008–2010	Portugal U21	11	(1)
- * Club domestic league appearances and goals

João Miguel Coimbra Aurélio (born 17 August 1988) is a Portuguese former professional footballer who played as a right-back or a right midfielder.

He spent the vast majority of his career with Nacional, making 344 competitive appearances over 12 seasons (two spells). He also represented Vitória de Guimarães and Moreirense in his country, totalling 318 Primeira Liga games.

Aurélio earned caps for Portugal at youth level.

== Club career ==
=== Nacional ===
Born in Beja, Aurélio began his professional career with lower league club S.C. Penalva do Castelo. In the 2008–09 season, he moved straight into the Primeira Liga with Madeira's C.D. Nacional, managing ten league appearances in his first year and scoring in a 2–1 away win against C.F. Os Belenenses on 26 April 2009.

In the following campaign, Aurélio started impressively, netting twice against Sporting CP in the opener – once in his own net – and S.C. Olhanense, both 1–1 draws. Additionally, he scored in the UEFA Europa League 4–3 home defeat of FC Zenit Saint Petersburg (eventual 5–4 aggregate win).

Aurélio continued to be an important first-team element in the following six top-division seasons, appearing in 149 matches and scoring in a 3–0 victory at Rio Ave F.C. on 28 September 2013. He also featured regularly as a right-back.

=== Vitória Guimarães ===
On 9 June 2016, Aurélio signed a two-year contract with Vitória de Guimarães, where he had played youth football from ages 17 to 19. He totalled 62 games for the side, including four in their run to the final of the Taça de Portugal, but was unused in the decisive match that the team lost 2–1 to S.L. Benfica.

Aurélio started in a 3–1 defeat to the same opponent in the Supertaça Cândido de Oliveira on 5 August 2017.

=== Moreirense ===
Having turned down the chance to play in Croatia for HNK Hajduk Split, Aurélio moved to Vitória's neighbours Moreirense F.C. on a two-year deal on 20 June 2018. In his third appearance, on 27 August, he scored with the last touch of the game to seal a 1–1 home draw with B-SAD.

=== Pafos ===
On 25 August 2020, the 32-year-old Aurélio left Portugal for the first time, signed for a two-year contract at Pafos FC of the Cypriot First Division on a free transfer. He made 57 appearances during his tenure, scoring in the 2–1 home win over Karmiotissa FC on 1 March 2021.

=== Return to Nacional ===
Aurélio returned to Nacional on 11 June 2022, agreeing to a three-year deal. He helped them to promote from the Liga Portugal 2 in his second season.

Aurélio played his 300th official match with the club on 6 April 2024, in a 2–1 home defeat of AVS Futebol SAD. He reached the same figure in the Portuguese main division on 23 August 2025, but in a 1–4 loss against Sporting also at the Estádio da Madeira.

On 2 June 2026, Aurélio announced his retirement aged 37.

== International career ==
After good performances for Nacional, Aurélio was called up to the Portugal under-21 side by Oceano for 2011 UEFA European Championship qualifiers. In the 81st minute of the match against Lithuania, he came on as a substitute for S.L. Benfica's Fábio Coentrão and headed in the final 4–1 three minutes later.

== Personal life ==
Aurélio's twin brother, Luís, was also a footballer and a midfielder. They were teammates at Nacional.

== Career statistics ==
As of 7 June 2021

Club	Season	League		Cup		League Cup		Europe		Other (Note: Includes Supertaça Cândido de Oliveira)		Total	
Club	Season	Apps	Goals	Apps	Goals	Apps	Goals	Apps	Goals	Apps	Goals	Apps	Goals
Penalva	2007–08	34	5	2	0	—		—		—		36	5
Nacional	2008–09	10	1	1	0	2	0	—		—		13	1
Nacional	2009–10	27	4	3	0	3	0	8	1	—		41	5
Nacional	2010–11	19	0	2	0	3	0	—		—		24	0
Nacional	2011–12	16	0	1	0	1	0	4	0	—		22	0
Nacional	2012–13	24	0	2	0	2	0	—		—		28	0
Nacional	2013–14	26	1	1	0	3	1	—		—		30	2
Nacional	2014–15	33	0	6	1	1	0	2	0	—		42	1
Nacional	2015–16	31	0	4	0	4	0	—		—		39	0
Nacional	Total	186	6	20	1	19	1	14	1	—		239	9
Vitória Guimarães	2016–17	25	0	5	0	2	0	—		—		32	0
Vitória Guimarães	2017–18	22	0	2	0	3	0	4	0	1	0	32	0
Vitória Guimarães	Total	47	0	7	0	5	0	4	0	1	0	64	0
Moreirense	2018–19	21	2	0	0	0	0	—		—		21	2
Moreirense	2019–20	29	2	0	0	1	0	—		—		30	2
Moreirense	Total	50	4	0	0	1	0	—		—		51	4
Pafos	2020–21	36	1	1	0	—		—		—		37	1
Career Total		353	16	30	1	25	1	18	1	1	0	427	19
