= Ulisses (footballer, born 1999) =

Brazilian footballer

Personal information
- Full name: Ulisses Wilson Jeronymo Rocha
- Date of birth: 28 September 1999 (age 27)
- Place of birth: São Paulo, Brazil
- Height: 1.86 m (6 ft 1 in)
- Position: Centre-back

Team information
- Current team: Nacional
- Number: 4

Youth career
- 2016–2017: Clube Atlético Diadema
- 2017–2020: Vasco da Gama

Senior career*
Years	Team	Apps	(Gls)
2020–	Vasco da Gama	16	(0)
2023	→ Vila Nova (loan)	0	(0)
2023–2024	→ Nacional (loan)	31	(1)
2024–	Nacional	34	(2)
- * Club domestic league appearances and goals as of 18 February 2026

Ulisses Wilson Jeronymo Rocha (born 28 September 1999), commonly known as Ulisses, is a Brazilian footballer who plays as a centre back for Primeira Liga club Nacional.

== Career statistics ==
=== Club ===
As of 7 June 2020.

Club	Season	League			State league		Cup		Continental		Other		Total	
Club	Season	Division	Apps	Goals	Apps	Goals	Apps	Goals	Apps	Goals	Apps	Goals	Apps	Goals
Vasco da Gama	2020	Série A	0	0	2 (Note: Appearances in the Campeonato Carioca)	0	0	0	0	0	0	0	2	0
Career total			0	0	2	0	0	0	0	0	0	0	2	0
