= Tiago Margarido =

Portuguese football manager and former player (born 1989)

Personal information
- Full name: Tiago Miguel Carvalho Margarido
- Date of birth: 2 January 1989 (age 37)
- Place of birth: Porto, Portugal
- Height: 1.84 m (6 ft 0 in)
- Position: Midfielder

Team information
- Current team: Vitória Guimarães (manager)

Youth career
- 1998–2004: Boavista
- 2004–2008: Leixões

Senior career*
Years	Team	Apps	(Gls)
2008–2009	Vilanovense		
2010–2012	Gondim-Maia		

Managerial career
- 2010–2012: EAS Vila Nova de Gaia (youth)
- 2012–2015: Gondim-Maia (assistant)
- 2015–2017: Pedras Rubras (assistant)
- 2017–2018: Oliveira Douro (assistant)
- 2018–2019: União Leiria (assistant)
- 2019: Canelas 2010 (assistant)
- 2019–2022: Canelas 2010
- 2022–2023: Varzim
- 2023–2026: Nacional
- 2026–: Vitória Guimarães
- * Club domestic league appearances and goals

Tiago Miguel Carvalho Margarido (born 2 January 1989) is a Portuguese former footballer who played mainly as a midfielder, and is the manager of Vitória de Guimarães.

== Career ==
Born in Porto, Margarido represented Boavista and Leixões as a youth, before making his senior debut with Vilanovense FC in 2008. He retired in 2012, after a two-year spell at Gondim-Maia, and became the club's assistant manager shortly after.

Margarido was also an assistant at Pedras Rubras, Oliveira do Douro, União de Leiria and Canelas 2010 before being appointed manager of the latter on 22 June 2019. On 6 May 2022, after qualifying the club to the newly created Liga 3, he left the club.

On 11 June 2022, Margarido was named manager of fellow third division side Varzim. On 12 February 2023, following a 1–0 loss to São João de Ver, he was sacked.

On 2 June 2023, Margarido was appointed in charge of Nacional in the Liga Portugal 2. The following 19 May, after achieving promotion to Primeira Liga, he renewed his contract until 2026.

Margarido departed Nacional on 20 May 2026, and took over fellow top tier side Vitória de Guimarães on 24 June.

== Managerial statistics ==
As of 21 November 2026

Managerial record by team and tenure
Team	Nat	From	To	Record							
Team	Nat	From	To	G	W	D	L	GF	GA	GD	Win %
Canelas 2010	(Portugal)	22 June 2019	6 May 2022	91	38	30	23	116	77	+39	41.76
Varzim	(Portugal)	10 June 2022	12 February 2023	23	13	4	6	26	18	+8	56.52
Nacional	(Portugal)	2 June 2023	20 May 2026	115	42	26	47	159	154	+5	36.52
Vitória de Guimarães	(Portugal)	24 June 2026	Present	13	3	3	7	12	14	−2	23.08
Total				242	96	63	83	313	263	+50	39.67
