= Jota (footballer, born 1993) =

Portuguese footballer

Personal information
- Full name: João Tiago Serrão Garcês
- Date of birth: 7 March 1993 (age 33)
- Place of birth: Funchal, Portugal
- Height: 1.76 m (5 ft 9 in)
- Position: Midfielder

Team information
- Current team: Machico

Youth career
- 2003–2012: Nacional

Senior career*
Years	Team	Apps	(Gls)
2012–2020	Nacional	113	(2)
2014–2015	→ União Madeira (loan)	15	(0)
2015	→ Atlético (loan)	16	(1)
2020–2021	Leixões	17	(0)
2021–2026	Nacional	48	(1)
2026–	Machico	5	(1)

International career
2012	Portugal U19	3	(0)
2012–2013	Portugal U20	9	(0)
- * Club domestic league appearances and goals as of 15:00, 11 October 2026 (UTC)

João Tiago Serrão Garcês (born 7 March 1993), commonly known as Jota, is a Portuguese professional footballer who plays as a midfielder for Campeonato de Portugal club Machico.
