= 2023–24 Liga Portugal 2 =

34th season of second-tier football league in Portugal

Liga Portugal 2
- Season: 2023–24
- Dates: 12 August 2023 – May 2024
- Champions: Santa Clara
- Promoted: Santa Clara; Nacional; AVS
- Relegated: Länk Vilaverdense; Belenenses
- Matches: 306

The 2023–24 Liga Portugal 2 (also known as Liga Portugal SABSEG for sponsorship reasons) was the 34th season of Portuguese football's second-tier league and the fourth season under the current Liga Portugal 2 title. A total of 18 teams compete in this division, including reserve sides from top-flight Liga Portugal teams.

== Teams ==
A total of 18 teams contest the league. Marítimo, Paços de Ferreira and Santa Clara were relegated to 2023–24 Liga Portugal 2 after finishing in 16th, 17th and 18th placed teams in 2022–23 Primeira Liga.

União de Leiria, Belenenses (promoted after an eleven and ten years absence, respectively) and Länk Vilaverdense (promoted for the first time in history) were promoted from the 2022–23 Liga 3, replacing B-SAD, Trofense and Sp. Covilhã (were relegated after one, two and fifteen years in the second tier, respectively).

Vilafranquense SAD, due to disputes with the club, relocated its team to the stadium of Desportivo das Aves 1930. However, it is not a fusion, as Aves will have no participation in the SAD or in running the team. Vilafranquense's SAD will change its name to match the new location, and the club (U.D. Vilafranquense) will form a new team in Lisbon's regional divisions.

=== Changes ===
Relegated from 2022–23 Primeira Liga

- Marítimo
- Paços de Ferreira
- Santa Clara

Promoted from 2022–23 Liga 3

- União de Leiria
- Belenenses
- Länk Vilaverdense

Promoted to 2023–24 Primeira Liga

- Moreirense
- Farense
- Estrela da Amadora

Relegated to 2023–24 Liga 3

- Trofense
- Sp. Covilhã
- B-SAD

=== Stadiums and Locations ===
Location of teams in 2023–24 Liga Portugal 2 (Mainland)
Location of teams in 2023–24 Liga Portugal 2 (Madeira)
Location of teams in 2023–24 Liga Portugal 2 (Azores)

| Club | Location | Stadium | Capacity | Final league position in 2022-23 |
|---|---|---|---|---|
| Académico de Viseu | Viseu | Estádio do Fontelo | 6,912 | 4th |
| AVS | Vila das Aves | Estádio do CD Aves | 6,230 | 7th* |
| Belenenses | Lisbon | Estádio do Restelo | 19,856 | 2nd (L3) |
| Benfica B | Seixal | Benfica Campus | 2,644 | 14th |
| Feirense | Santa Maria da Feira | Estádio Marcolino de Castro | 5,401 | 8th |
| Länk Vilaverdense | Vila Verde | Campo Cruz do Reguengo | 1,000 | 3rd (L3) |
| Leixões | Matosinhos | Estádio do Mar | 9,821 | 15th |
| Mafra | Mafra | Estádio Municipal de Mafra | 1,257 | 6th |
| Marítimo | Funchal | Estádio do Marítimo | 10,600 | 16th (PL) |
| Nacional | Funchal | Estádio da Madeira | 5,200 | 13th |
| Oliveirense | Oliveira de Azeméis | Estádio Carlos Osório | 1,750 | 10th |
| Paços de Ferreira | Paços de Ferreira | Estádio Capital do Móvel | 9,076 | 17th (PL) |
| Penafiel | Penafiel | Estádio Municipal 25 de Abril | 5,230 | 12th |
| Porto B | Vila Nova de Gaia | Estádio Luís Filipe Menezes | 3,800 | 5th |
| Santa Clara | Ponta Delgada | Estádio de São Miguel | 12,500 | 18th (PL) |
| Tondela | Tondela | Estádio João Cardoso | 5,000 | 11th |
| Torreense | Torres Vedras | Estádio Manuel Marques | 2,431 | 9th |
| União de Leiria | Leiria | Estádio Dr. Magalhães Pessoa | 23,888 | 1st (L3) |

=== Personnel and sponsors ===
| Team | Manager | Captain | Kit Manufacturer | Main Sponsor |
|---|---|---|---|---|
| Académico de Viseu | (Portugal) Gil Oliveira | (Portugal) André Almeida | Joma | Palácio do Gelo |
| AVS | (Portugal) Jorge Costa | (Portugal) Luís Silva | Adidas | Mercainos |
| Belenenses | (Portugal) Vasco Faísca | (Portugal) Duarte Valente | Joma | Novaverde |
| Benfica B | (Portugal) Nélson Veríssimo | (Albania) Adrian Bajrami | Adidas | Emirates |
| Feirense | (Portugal) Ricardo Sousa | (Portugal) Cláudio Silva | Kelme | Esconline |
| Länk Vilaverdense | (Portugal) Sérgio Machado | (Portugal) André Soares | Lacatoni | Mebra |
| Leixões | (Portugal) Carlos Fangueiro | (Serbia) Igor Stefanovic | AM | Matosinhos |
| Mafra | (Portugal) Silas | (Portugal) Gui Ferreira | Lacatoni | Placard |
| Marítimo | (Portugal) Fábio Pereira | (Portugal) Edgar Costa | Puma | Coral Cerveja |
| Nacional | (Portugal) Tiago Margarido | (Portugal) João Aurélio | Hummel | Solverde |
| Oliveirense | (Portugal) Ricardo Chéu | (Brazil) Filipe Alves | Kelme | Onodera Group |
| Paços de Ferreira | (Portugal) Ricardo Silva | (Portugal) Antunes | Joma | Solverde |
| Penafiel | (Portugal) Hélder Cristóvão | (Portugal) João Miguel | Macron | EDIRCOP |
| Porto B | (Portugal) António Folha | (Portugal) Zé Pedro | New Balance | Betano |
| Santa Clara | (Portugal) Vasco Matos | (Portugal) Ricardinho | Kelme | Solverde |
| Tondela | (Portugal) Sérgio Gaminha | (Portugal) Ricardo Alves | CDT | Cabriz |
| Torreense | (Portugal) Tulipa | (Portugal) João Pereira | Kappa | Agriloja |
| União de Leiria | (Portugal) Vasco Botelho da Costa | (Portugal) Diogo Amado | CDT | Porta10 |

== Season summary ==
=== League table ===
| Pos | Team | Pld | W | D | L | GF | GA | GD | Pts | Promotion or relegation |
|---|---|---|---|---|---|---|---|---|---|---|
| 1 | Santa Clara (C, P) | 34 | 21 | 10 | 3 | 48 | 19 | +29 | 73 | Promotion to Liga Portugal |
| 2 | Nacional (P) | 34 | 21 | 8 | 5 | 66 | 35 | +31 | 71 | Promotion to Liga Portugal |
| 3 | AVS (O, P) | 34 | 20 | 4 | 10 | 47 | 31 | +16 | 64 (Note: Ranked on head-to-head: AVS 3–2 Marítimo, Marítimo 0–1 AVS) | Qualification for promotion play-offs |
| 4 | Marítimo | 34 | 18 | 10 | 6 | 52 | 29 | +23 | 64 | |
| 5 | Paços de Ferreira | 34 | 14 | 10 | 10 | 42 | 35 | +7 | 52 | |
| 6 | Tondela | 34 | 12 | 13 | 9 | 46 | 43 | +3 | 49 | |
| 7 | Torreense | 34 | 13 | 9 | 12 | 40 | 37 | +3 | 48 | |
| 8 | Benfica B (Note: Ineligible for promotion) | 34 | 12 | 9 | 13 | 48 | 48 | 0 | 45 | |
| 9 | Mafra | 34 | 11 | 11 | 12 | 37 | 39 | −2 | 44 (Note: Ranked on head-to-head: Mafra 2–1 Porto B, Porto B 1–1 Mafra) | |
| 10 | Porto B | 34 | 12 | 8 | 14 | 51 | 51 | 0 | 44 | |
| 11 | Académico de Viseu | 34 | 9 | 16 | 9 | 36 | 38 | −2 | 43 | |
| 12 | União de Leiria | 34 | 11 | 9 | 14 | 44 | 40 | +4 | 42 | |
| 13 | Penafiel | 34 | 11 | 6 | 17 | 31 | 39 | −8 | 39 | |
| 14 | Leixões | 34 | 7 | 16 | 11 | 29 | 38 | −9 | 37 | |
| 15 | Oliveirense | 34 | 8 | 10 | 16 | 37 | 54 | −17 | 34 | |
| 16 | Feirense (O) | 34 | 8 | 7 | 19 | 31 | 49 | −18 | 31 | Qualification for relegation play-offs |
| 17 | Länk Vilaverdense (Note: Länk Vilaverdense were deducted 1 point for financial irregularities.) (R) | 34 | 8 | 4 | 22 | 30 | 59 | −29 | 27 | Relegation to Liga 3 |
| 18 | Belenenses (R) | 34 | 6 | 8 | 20 | 28 | 59 | −31 | 26 | Relegation to Liga 3 |

Source: Liga Portugal 2
Rules for classification: 1) Points; 2) Head-to-head points; 3) Head-to-head goal difference; 4) Head-to-head away goals scored; 5) Goal difference; 6) Matches won; 7) Goals scored; 8) Play-off.
(C) Champions; (O) Play-off winners; (P) Promoted; (R) Relegated

== Relegation play-offs ==
The relegation play-offs took place on 26 May and 2 June 2024 between Feirense which finished 16th in the Liga 2 and Lusitânia Lourosa which finished 3rd in Liga 3.

All times are WEST (UTC+1).

| Team 1 | Agg. | Team 2 | 1st leg | 2nd leg |
|---|---|---|---|---|
| Feirense | 3–1 | Lusitânia Lourosa | 0–1 | 3–0 |

26 May 2024
11:00

| Lusitânia Lourosa | 1–0 | Feirense |
|---|---|---|
| Jefferson Nem 70' | Report |

Campo do Lusitânia, Lourosa
Referee: Artur Soares Dias (Porto)
2 June 2024
17:00

| Feirense | 3–0 | Lusitânia Lourosa |
|---|---|---|
| Sérgio Conceição 15', 82' (pen.); Henrique Martins 89' (o.g.) | Report |

Estádio Marcolino de Castro, Santa Maria da Feira
Referee: Nuno Almeida (Algarve)

== Results ==
| Home \ Away | ACV | AVS | BEL | BEN | FEI | LAN | LEX | MAF | MAR | NAC | OLI | PAC | PEN | POR | SAN | TON | TOR | UNI |
|---|---|---|---|---|---|---|---|---|---|---|---|---|---|---|---|---|---|---|
| Académico de Viseu | — | 0–1 | 3–1 | 1–0 | 2–0 | 1–1 | 1–1 | 0–1 | 2–2 | 1–1 | 2–2 | 1–1 | 1–0 | 0–2 | 1–1 | 1–1 | 0–0 | 1–0 |
| AVS | 2–0 | — | 1–0 | 1–0 | 1–0 | 2–0 | 1–3 | 3–3 | 3–2 | 0–1 | 0–1 | 2–0 | 1–0 | 0–2 | 1–2 | 0–1 | 0–0 | 2–1 |
| Belenenses | 1–0 | 1–3 | — | 2–3 | 3–1 | 0–2 | 1–2 | 1–1 | 1–2 | 1–3 | 1–0 | 0–1 | 2–0 | 1–1 | 0–0 | 0–0 | 0–2 | 0–5 |
| Benfica B | 1–1 | 0–1 | 2–1 | — | 2–3 | 2–0 | 1–1 | 3–2 | 0–1 | 2–1 | 1–1 | 2–2 | 1–0 | 5–2 | 0–1 | 1–1 | 0–2 | 0–1 |
| Feirense | 0–3 | 1–2 | 1–0 | 1–2 | — | 1–1 | 1–1 | 3–2 | 0–1 | 2–1 | 0–0 | 1–0 | 2–0 | 1–1 | 0–2 | 1–3 | 3–1 | 1–0 |
| Länk Vilaverdense | 0–2 | 2–3 | 1–1 | 1–4 | 2–1 | — | 1–0 | 2–1 | 0–2 | 1–2 | 1–2 | 0–1 | 2–1 | 0–5 | 1–1 | 1–2 | 0–1 | 1–0 |
| Leixões | 1–2 | 0–0 | 1–0 | 1–1 | 0–0 | 1–3 | — | 1–1 | 0–1 | 1–1 | 0–2 | 1–1 | 0–1 | 1–3 | 0–0 | 1–1 | 1–1 | 0–0 |
| Mafra | 1–1 | 0–2 | 1–1 | 1–2 | 0–0 | 1–0 | 0–1 | — | 0–0 | 0–0 | 3–3 | 2–1 | 0–1 | 2–1 | 0–2 | 1–3 | 2–1 | 3–0 |
| Marítimo | 1–1 | 0–1 | 1–1 | 3–1 | 3–2 | 4–0 | 0–0 | 1–2 | — | 3–1 | 2–1 | 2–0 | 0–0 | 1–0 | 0–0 | 2–2 | 1–2 | 2–0 |
| Nacional | 1–1 | 2–1 | 5–0 | 3–1 | 1–0 | 3–2 | 3–1 | 2–0 | 1–2 | — | 5–0 | 2–1 | 3–2 | 4–0 | 1–1 | 1–1 | 2–1 | 2–0 |
| Oliveirense | 2–2 | 1–1 | 1–2 | 3–1 | 3–1 | 0–1 | 1–3 | 1–3 | 1–1 | 0–1 | — | 0–0 | 3–1 | 1–3 | 1–1 | 2–1 | 1–2 | 1–4 |
| Paços de Ferreira | 1–0 | 0–4 | 2–1 | 2–2 | 1–0 | 2–0 | 1–2 | 0–1 | 1–2 | 1–1 | 2–0 | — | 2–1 | 3–0 | 0–2 | 5–1 | 2–0 | 0–0 |
| Penafiel | 0–0 | 0–1 | 3–0 | 0–1 | 2–1 | 2–1 | 3–0 | 1–0 | 0–1 | 1–4 | 1–1 | 1–1 | — | 3–2 | 1–2 | 0–2 | 1–1 | 1–0 |
| Porto B | 3–0 | 2–3 | 3–0 | 0–3 | 2–0 | 2–1 | 0–2 | 1–1 | 0–2 | 2–3 | 0–1 | 1–3 | 3–1 | — | 2–2 | 1–1 | 2–2 | 2–1 |
| Santa Clara | 2–0 | 2–1 | 2–0 | 1–1 | 2–1 | 2–0 | 2–0 | 0–1 | 2–1 | 0–1 | 3–0 | 0–1 | 0–0 | 2–1 | — | 1–0 | 2–0 | 2–0 |
| Tondela | 2–2 | 3–2 | 0–1 | 1–1 | 2–0 | 1–0 | 4–2 | 2–1 | 0–3 | 2–3 | 1–0 | 1–1 | 0–1 | 0–0 | 2–3 | — | 1–2 | 1–1 |
| Torreense | 1–2 | 2–1 | 2–2 | 3–1 | 2–1 | 3–1 | 0–0 | 0–0 | 0–0 | 3–0 | 3–1 | 1–2 | 1–0 | 0–1 | 1–2 | 0–1 | — | 0–3 |
| União de Leiria | 3–0 | 1–2 | 4–2 | 3–1 | 1–1 | 3–1 | 0–0 | 2–3 | 4–3 | 1–1 | 1–0 | 1–1 | 0–2 | 1–1 | 0–1 | 2–2 | 1–0 | — |

Updated to match(es) played on 19 May 2024. Source: Liga Portugal 2
Legend: Blue = home team win; Yellow = draw; Red = away team win.

=== Positions by round ===
The table lists the positions of teams after each week of matches. In order to preserve chronological evolvements, any postponed matches are not included to the round at which they were originally scheduled, but added to the full round they were played immediately afterwards.

| Team ╲ Round | 1 | 2 | 3 | 4 | 5 | 6 | 7 | 8 | 9 | 10 | 11 | 12 | 13 | 14 | 15 | 16 | 17 | 18 | 19 | 20 | 21 | 22 | 23 | 24 | 25 | 26 | 27 | 28 | 29 | 30 | 31 | 32 | 33 | 34 |
|---|---|---|---|---|---|---|---|---|---|---|---|---|---|---|---|---|---|---|---|---|---|---|---|---|---|---|---|---|---|---|---|---|---|---|
| Santa Clara | 3 | 4 | 2 | 1 | 3 | 2 | 3 | 3 | 3 | 3 | 2 | 2 | 1 | 1 | 2 | 3 | 1 | 1 | 1 | 1 | 1 | 1 | 1 | 1 | 1 | 1 | 1 | 1 | 1 | 1 | 1 | 1 | 1 | 1 |
| Nacional | 14 | 18 | 12 | 8 | 6 | 4 | 2 | 2 | 2 | 2 | 1 | 1 | 3 | 3 | 3 | 2 | 2 | 3 | 3 | 3 | 3 | 3 | 3 | 3 | 3 | 3 | 3 | 3 | 3 | 2 | 2 | 2 | 2 | 2 |
| AVS | 6 | 2 | 3 | 2 | 1 | 1 | 1 | 1 | 1 | 1 | 3 | 3 | 2 | 2 | 1 | 1 | 3 | 2 | 2 | 2 | 2 | 2 | 2 | 2 | 2 | 2 | 2 | 2 | 2 | 3 | 3 | 3 | 3 | 3 |
| Marítimo | 5 | 9 | 4 | 4 | 2 | 3 | 4 | 4 | 4 | 4 | 5 | 6 | 4 | 4 | 4 | 4 | 4 | 4 | 4 | 4 | 4 | 4 | 4 | 4 | 4 | 4 | 4 | 4 | 4 | 4 | 4 | 4 | 4 | 4 |
| Paços de Ferreira | 11 | 15 | 7 | 11 | 15 | 17 | 12 | 10 | 9 | 9 | 11 | 12 | 10 | 10 | 11 | 9 | 8 | 10 | 10 | 10 | 11 | 10 | 10 | 9 | 6 | 7 | 6 | 6 | 6 | 5 | 6 | 5 | 5 | 5 |
| Tondela | 7 | 11 | 16 | 16 | 12 | 13 | 9 | 11 | 13 | 11 | 8 | 7 | 7 | 8 | 6 | 6 | 6 | 5 | 5 | 7 | 7 | 7 | 6 | 6 | 7 | 6 | 5 | 5 | 5 | 6 | 5 | 6 | 7 | 6 |
| Torreense | 17 | 5 | 9 | 5 | 4 | 5 | 6 | 7 | 6 | 5 | 4 | 5 | 6 | 6 | 5 | 5 | 5 | 6 | 7 | 5 | 5 | 5 | 5 | 5 | 5 | 5 | 7 | 8 | 7 | 9 | 10 | 9 | 6 | 7 |
| Benfica B | 4 | 10 | 12 | 14 | 16 | 11 | 14 | 14 | 11 | 14 | 12 | 15 | 14 | 14 | 13 | 12 | 10 | 8 | 9 | 9 | 9 | 11 | 9 | 10 | 10 | 9 | 10 | 11 | 11 | 12 | 12 | 12 | 12 | 8 |
| Mafra | 13 | 7 | 10 | 6 | 9 | 7 | 5 | 5 | 10 | 10 | 7 | 8 | 8 | 5 | 7 | 7 | 7 | 9 | 6 | 8 | 8 | 8 | 8 | 8 | 9 | 10 | 9 | 10 | 9 | 8 | 8 | 7 | 8 | 9 |
| Porto B | 7 | 13 | 6 | 9 | 11 | 8 | 8 | 6 | 5 | 6 | 6 | 4 | 5 | 7 | 8 | 10 | 11 | 11 | 11 | 11 | 10 | 12 | 12 | 11 | 11 | 11 | 11 | 7 | 8 | 7 | 7 | 8 | 9 | 10 |
| Académico de Viseu | 7 | 11 | 5 | 7 | 8 | 10 | 13 | 13 | 15 | 13 | 15 | 13 | 13 | 11 | 10 | 8 | 9 | 7 | 8 | 6 | 6 | 6 | 7 | 7 | 8 | 8 | 8 | 9 | 10 | 11 | 9 | 10 | 11 | 11 |
| União de Leiria | 11 | 3 | 8 | 12 | 7 | 9 | 11 | 8 | 7 | 8 | 10 | 10 | 9 | 9 | 9 | 13 | 14 | 15 | 13 | 13 | 13 | 9 | 11 | 12 | 12 | 12 | 12 | 12 | 12 | 10 | 11 | 11 | 10 | 12 |
| Penafiel | 1 | 5 | 11 | 13 | 10 | 15 | 16 | 15 | 16 | 15 | 16 | 16 | 17 | 15 | 15 | 14 | 15 | 14 | 12 | 12 | 12 | 13 | 13 | 13 | 13 | 13 | 14 | 13 | 13 | 13 | 13 | 13 | 13 | 13 |
| Leixões | 18 | 17 | 18 | 17 | 13 | 16 | 17 | 16 | 12 | 16 | 14 | 14 | 15 | 16 | 16 | 15 | 16 | 16 | 16 | 16 | 16 | 16 | 16 | 14 | 14 | 14 | 13 | 14 | 14 | 14 | 14 | 15 | 15 | 14 |
| Oliveirense | 2 | 1 | 1 | 3 | 5 | 6 | 7 | 9 | 8 | 7 | 9 | 9 | 11 | 12 | 14 | 16 | 12 | 12 | 14 | 14 | 14 | 15 | 15 | 16 | 16 | 16 | 16 | 15 | 15 | 15 | 15 | 14 | 14 | 15 |
| Feirense | 16 | 8 | 14 | 15 | 17 | 12 | 10 | 12 | 14 | 12 | 13 | 11 | 12 | 13 | 12 | 11 | 13 | 13 | 15 | 15 | 15 | 14 | 14 | 15 | 15 | 15 | 15 | 16 | 16 | 16 | 16 | 16 | 16 | 16 |
| Länk Vilaverdense | 7 | 14 | 17 | 18 | 18 | 18 | 18 | 18 | 18 | 18 | 18 | 18 | 18 | 18 | 18 | 18 | 17 | 17 | 17 | 17 | 17 | 17 | 17 | 17 | 17 | 17 | 18 | 17 | 18 | 18 | 18 | 18 | 17 | 17 |
| Belenenses | 15 | 15 | 15 | 10 | 14 | 14 | 15 | 17 | 17 | 17 | 17 | 17 | 16 | 17 | 17 | 17 | 18 | 18 | 18 | 18 | 18 | 18 | 18 | 18 | 18 | 18 | 17 | 18 | 17 | 17 | 17 | 17 | 18 | 18 |

| Leader and promotion to Primeira Liga |
| Promotion to Primeira Liga |
| Qualification for promotion play-offs |
| Qualification for relegation play-offs |
| Relegation to Liga 3 |

Updated to match(es) played on 19 May 2024. Source: Liga Portugal 2

== Number of teams by district ==
| Rank | District Football Associations | Number | Teams |
|---|---|---|---|
| 1 | Porto | 5 | AVS, Leixões, Paços de Ferreira, Penafiel and Porto B |
| 2 | Lisbon | 4 | Belenenses, Benfica B, Mafra and Torreense |
| 3 | Aveiro | 2 | Feirense and Oliveirense |
| 3 | Funchal | 2 | Marítimo and Nacional |
| 3 | Viseu | 2 | Académico de Viseu and Tondela |
| 6 | Braga | 1 | Länk Vilaverdense |
| 6 | Leiria | 1 | União de Leiria |
| 6 | Ponta Delgada | 1 | Santa Clara |

== Attendances ==
| # | Club | Average |
|---|---|---|
| 1 | Marítimo | 7,320 |
| 2 | Leiria | 5,771 |
| 3 | Paços | 2,144 |
| 4 | Santa Clara | 2,131 |
| 5 | Nacional | 2,086 |
| 6 | Feirense | 1,817 |
| 7 | Os Belenenses | 1,799 |
| 8 | Leixões | 1,790 |
| 9 | Viseu | 1,449 |
| 10 | Tondela | 1,142 |
| 11 | Torreense | 942 |
| 12 | AVS | 934 |
| 13 | Penafiel | 791 |
| 14 | Mafra | 769 |
| 15 | Oliveirense | 607 |
| 16 | Porto B | 497 |
| 17 | Benfica B | 493 |
| 18 | Vilaverdense | 240 |
