= Estádio da Madeira =

Football stadium in Funchal, Madeira, Portugal

Coordinates: 32°40′14.25″N 16°53′00.69″W

- Choupana
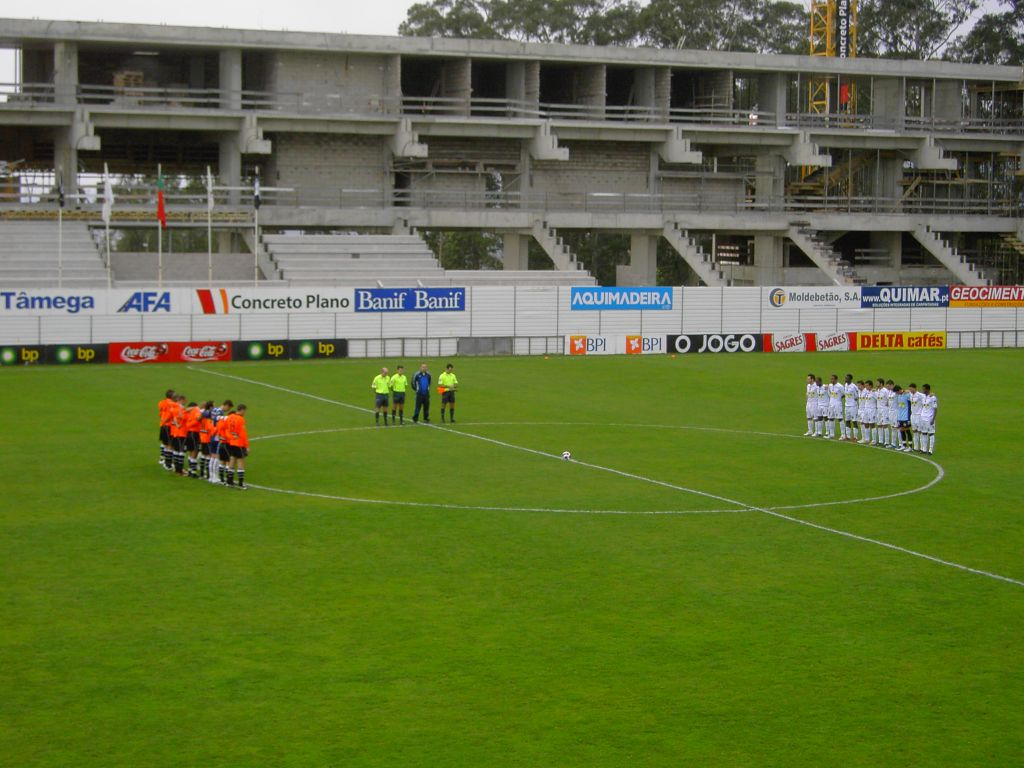
- The new stand which was built in 2007
- Interactive map of Estádio da Madeira
- Full name: Estádio da Madeira
- Former names: Estádio Eng.º Rui Alves
- Location: Funchal, Madeira, Portugal
- Owner: C.D. Nacional
- Capacity: 5,200
- Surface: Grass
- Field size: 105 x 68 m

Construction
- Built: 1999; 27 years ago
- Opened: 13 February 1999
- Expanded: 16 November 2007
- Cost: €23 million (complex)

Tenants
- C.D. Nacional; C.F. União (2012)

The Estádio da Madeira, previously named Estádio Eng.º Rui Alves and informally known as Choupana, is a football stadium located in the city of Funchal, Madeira, Portugal. The stadium currently has a capacity of 5,200 people and is owned by Nacional da Madeira.

The stadium is located in Cidade Desportiva do C.D. Nacional (English: C.D. Nacional Sport City), which also includes training pitches and a youth campus called Cristiano Ronaldo Campus Futebol, in honour of Cristiano Ronaldo. The Cidade Desportiva is located in the north of Funchal, high up in the mountains in the Choupana neighbourhood.

== History ==
For the majority of their history, Nacional played its home matches at Estádio dos Barreiros together with rival teams Marítimo and União.

However, with visionary President Rui Alves at the helm of the club, plans were announced in 1997 for a new stadium and sport complex in the Choupana, area of Funchal, with construction starting the following year. A site adjoining to the existing Campo do Pomar was selected for the new stadium. On 13 February 1999, the venue, then with only one stand for 2,500 seats and named as Estádio Eng.º Rui Alves, hosted Nacional's first official match at the Choupana Sports Complex. In that debut, Nacional beat Amora 3–0. The official inauguration of the first phase of the Complex took place on 8 December 1999. That year, the club moved permanently to Choupana ceasing to play at the municipal stadium, Estádio dos Barreiros, which was shared between the three largest clubs in the region.

Following Nacional's promotion to the Primeira Liga and appearance in the 2004–05 UEFA Cup, further development on the stadium was announced in 2005, with plans to increase the seating capacity and expand the surrounding sports complex, with the regional government committed to fund 80% of the budget. After a period of construction, the stadium re-opened in 2007 with its second expansion, increasing the seating capacity to 5,200 seats with a new fully covered west stand. Since then, the stadium has had two stands running the entire length of the pitch, with high fences at both ends of the pitch.

On 1 June 2007, the stadium was renamed Estádio da Madeira, after the club reached an agreement with the local government to promote the Madeira Region. The newly constructed west stand was opened for the home match against Benfica on 2 September 2007, whilst the full expansion of the C.D. Nacional Sports Complex, was inaugurated on 16 November 2007 with a friendly match, also against Benfica. The youth academy Football Campus was named in honour of former player Cristiano Ronaldo. The total cost for the stadium and sport complex expansions were reported to be around €23 million, funded by the regional government of Madeira.
