= C.D. Nacional =

Portuguese football club

Nacional da Madeira
- Full name: Clube Desportivo Nacional
- Nicknames: Alvinegros (White-and-Black); Nacionalistas (Nationalists)
- Founded: 8 December 1910; 115 years ago
- Stadium: Estádio da Madeira
- Capacity: 5,200
- President: Rui Alves
- Head coach: Alexandre Santos
- League: Primeira Liga
- 2025–26: Primeira Liga, 14th of 18
- Website: cdnacional.pt
Home colours	Away colours	Third colours

Clube Desportivo Nacional (Portuguese pronunciation: [nɐsjuˈnal dɐ mɐˈðɐjɾɐ]), commonly known as Nacional da Madeira and sometimes just Nacional, is a Portuguese football club based in Funchal, on the island of Madeira.

Founded on 8 December 1910, it currently plays in the Liga Portugal , Portugal's top-tier division of professional football. It plays its home games at Estádio da Madeira, also known as Estádio da Choupana. Built in 1998 and named at the time Estádio Eng. Rui Alves after the current club president Rui Alves, it seats approximately 5,200 people. The stadium is located in the north of Funchal, high in the mountains of the Choupana district. The club's home colours are black and white striped shirts with black shorts and socks. Nacional is also known for being one of the clubs that formed Portuguese international Cristiano Ronaldo and to honour the club's most famous player they named their youth training facilities Cristiano Ronaldo Câmpus Futebol.

The Alvinegros played in the Primeira Liga in 1988–91, 2002–17, 2018–19 and 2020–21. Their best top-tier league finish was fourth in the 2003–04 and 2008–09 seasons, with Brazilian striker Nenê winning the Bola da Prata for top scorer with 20 goals in the latter. They have played in the UEFA Europa League on five occasions between 2004 and 2014, beating Zenit St. Petersburg in the play-off round and taking third place in the group stage in 2009–10. The team has reached the Taça de Portugal semi-finals four times between 2009 and 2023, and the Taça da Liga semi-final in 2010–11. Notable managers include Manuel Machado, who led the team in five spells from 2005 to 2021. They currently play in Primera Liga, after they got promoted from the 2023–24 Liga Portugal 2.

Like many other Portuguese clubs, Nacional operates several sports teams outside the football team. Other sports groups within the organisation include beach soccer, boxing, artistic gymnastics, rhythmic gymnastics, tennis, triathlon, muay thai, padel, rallying, swimming and veterans' soccer.

== History ==
Nacional reached the first division for the first time ever with a three-season spell from 1988. Under manager José Peseiro, the team returned for 2002–03 after winning promotion in third place. The team finished comfortably in 11th, with results including a 1–0 home win over S.L. Benfica on 28 September 2002 and a 3–2 win at C.S. Marítimo in the Madeira derby the following 2 February. Peseiro's successor Casemiro Mior took the team to a joint-best 4th place in 2003–04, including another home win over Benfica, shortly after that team had knocked them out of the quarter-finals of the Taça de Portugal. Stars of this team included Brazilians Paulo Assunção (defensive midfielder) and forward Adriano (16 and 19 goals in respective seasons), both of whom later played for FC Porto.

Nacional's debut European season in the 2004–05 UEFA Cup ended in the first round with a 4–1 aggregate loss to Spain's Sevilla FC. In January 2005, Mior left for Club Athletico Paranaense in his homeland. Manuel Machado led the team to fifth in 2005–06, again reaching the UEFA Cup, but left due to his wife and children living in continental Portugal. The club's second run in European competition again ended at the first hurdle, 3–1 on aggregate to CS Rapid București of Romania.

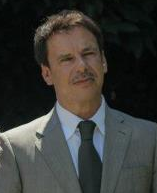
Manuel Machado managed Nacional in five spells between 2005 and 2021

Under the returning Machado in 2008–09, again edged S.C. Braga for fourth spot. Brazilian forward Nenê earned the Bola da Prata for top scorer with 20 goals, three more than Benfica's Óscar Cardozo and Sporting CP's Liédson. The side also reached the last-four in the Portuguese Cup, losing on aggregate 5–4 to F.C. Paços de Ferreira, with the decider coming at the Estádio da Madeira in the 90th minute.

Nacional started the 2009–10 season without Nenê, who was sold in June to Cagliari Calcio of the Italian Serie A for a fee potentially rising to €10 million. However, in August the club won a European tie for the first time, defeating 2008 champions FC Zenit Saint Petersburg 5–4 on aggregate in the playoffs of the renamed UEFA Europa League; the team were heading out on the away goals rule until a last-minute goal from youngster Rúben Micael earned a 1–1 draw in Russia. Nacional were eliminated in the group stage, third behind SV Werder Bremen and Athletic Bilbao but ahead of FK Austria Wien. In 2010–11, former club players Predrag Jokanović and Ivo Vieira led the team to 6th and a European return, as well as the semi-finals of the Taça da Liga for the first time (at Porto's expense), losing 4–3 to Paços de Ferreira. In the following season, following Europa League playoff elimination by Birmingham City, the team made the national cup semi-finals again, losing 5–3 on aggregate to Sporting.

In his fourth of five spells as Nacional manager, Machado led the team to 5th in 2013–14, making the Europa League playoffs and falling at the first hurdle 5–2 on aggregate to FC Dinamo Minsk of Belarus. In the 2014–15 Taça de Portugal they made a third semi-final in seven years, again losing to Sporting. The 2016–17 season, which included Jokanović's fourth spell as manager, ended with relegation in last place, a conclusion to 15 years in the top flight.

Former Portugal international Costinha was hired in 2017 and won promotion at the first attempt as champions of the 2017–18 LigaPro; Cape Verde international striker Ricardo Gomes was the league's top scorer with 22 goals in 36 games and left the club for FK Partizan in Serbia at the end of his contract. Costinha left after relegation from the 2018–19 Primeira Liga, in which results included a 10–0 loss to eventual winners Benfica.

The 2019–20 LigaPro was abandoned due to the COVID-19 pandemic in Portugal, resulting in promotion for first-placed Nacional; it was the sixth promotion in the career of 34-year-old manager Luís Freire. The team were immediately relegated in last place, with Freire sacked in March 2021 and Machado seeing out the season in his fifth spell. The team reached the semi-finals of the 2022–23 Taça de Portugal, losing 7–2 on aggregate to Braga, while the league season went to the final day; a 3–2 home win over Académico de Viseu F.C. after losing at half time saved the team in 14th place while B-SAD took the relegation playoff position.

After 13 seasons with Hummel, the team announced its new partnership with Kappa ahead of the 2025–26 season.

== Club presidents ==
- António Ascensão Figueira (1910–1926)
- Ernesto Pelágio dos Santos (1926–1932)
- António Caldeira (1932–1936)
- Dr. Consuelo Figueira (1936–1940)
- Luís Lopes Serrão (1940–1944)
- Dr. Daniel Brazão Machado (1944–1948)
- Dr. José Telentino Costa César Abreu (1954–1958)
- Dr. António Manuel Sales Caldeira (1958–1964)
- Fernando Pereira Rebelo (1964–1965)
- Luís Lopes Serrão (1966–1969)
- Antonio Manuel Sales Caldeira (1969–1973)
- Nélio Jorge Ferraz Mendonça (1973–1993)
- Dr. Fausto Pereira (1993–1994)
- Eng. Rui António Macedo Alves (1994–2014)
- João Gris Teixeira (2014–2015)
- Eng. Rui António Macedo Alves (2015–Present)

== Stadium ==
The Estádio da Madeira, better known as the Choupana, houses Nacional. The current stadium is located around nearby training pitches. The club also built an academy campus in the name of its most famous player, Cristiano Ronaldo. The stadium was renovated in 2007, with a new stand added and also capacity increased to 5,200 spectators. The total price of the renovations was €23 million.

In these new facilities, no stands were put behind the goals, with a tall fence used in its place. In mid-2007, the stadium name was changed to Estádio da Madeira, because of the excellent sports facilities.

== Rivalry ==
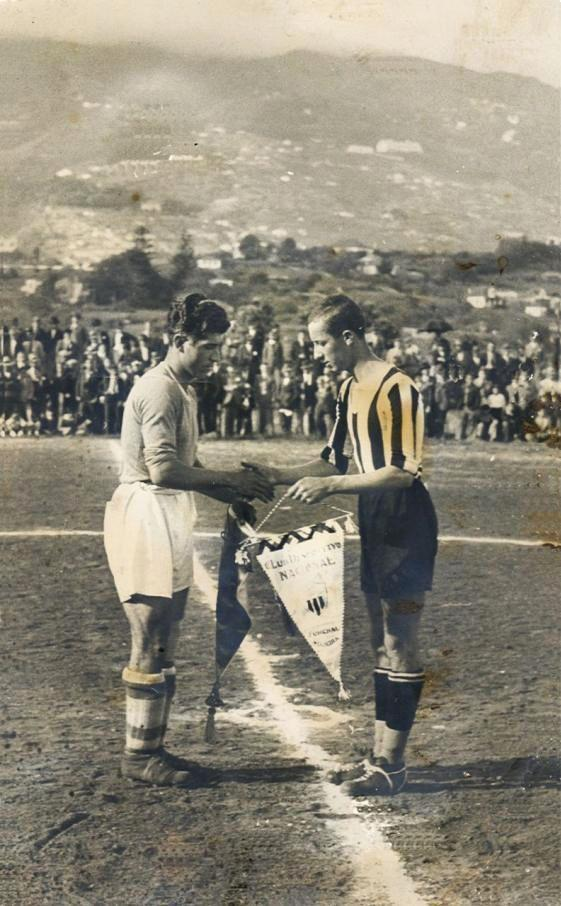
Nacional in 1925

Nacional has a big rivalry with Madeira-neighbours Marítimo. Historically, Marítimo dominated Nacional in the early years, being the first to reach European competition.

== Honours ==
=== National competitions ===
- Segunda Liga
  - Winners: 2017–18
- Segunda Divisão B / South Zone
  - Winners: 1999–2000

=== Regional competitions ===
- AF Madeira Championship
  - Winners (8): 1934–35, 1936–37, 1938–39, 1941–42, 1942–43, 1943–44, 1968–69, 1974–75
- AF Madeira Cup
  - Winners (6): 1943–44, 1944–45, 1973–74, 1974–75, 2001–02, 2007–08

=== Other ===
- Ramón de Carranza Trophy
  - Winners: 2012

== League and Cup history ==
Season	League									Cup	League Cup	Europe (UEFA)		Notes
Season	Div.	Pos.	Pld	W	D	L	GF	GA	Pts	Result	Result	Competition	Result	Notes
1988–89	1D	10th	38	12	12	14	43	49	36	R6	—N/a	–	–	
1989–90	1D	14th	34	7	14	13	34	46	28	R6	—N/a	–	–	
1990–91	1D	20th	38	8	11	19	33	60	27	R5	—N/a	–	–	^{[A]}
1991–92	2D	14th	34	6	13	15	26	42	25	R4	—N/a	–	–	
1992–93	2D	13th	34	10	10	14	32	42	30	R4	—N/a	–	–	
1993–94	2D	11th	34	10	11	13	32	33	31	R3	—N/a	–	–	
1994–95	2D	13th	34	11	10	13	39	42	32	R4	—N/a	–	–	
1995–96	2D	16th	34	11	6	17	39	43	39	R4	—N/a	–	–	^{[B]}
1996–97	2DS	1st	34	24	6	4	80	30	78	R4	—N/a	–	–	^{[C]}
1997–98	2D	18th	34	6	9	19	37	58	27	R4	—N/a	–	–	^{[B]}
1998–99	2DS	9th	34	15	4	15	42	39	49	R4	—N/a	–	–	
1999–2000	2DS	1st	38	25	8	5	66	32	83	R2	—N/a	–	–	^{[C]}
2000–01	2D	7th	34	14	9	11	55	52	51	R6	—N/a	–	–	
2001–02	2D	3rd	34	18	8	8	62	39	62	R3	—N/a	–	–	^{[D]}
2002–03	1D	11th	34	9	13	12	40	46	40	R5	—N/a	–	–	
2003–04	1D	4th	34	17	5	12	56	35	56	QF	—N/a	–	–	^{[E]}
2004–05	1D	12th	34	12	5	17	46	48	41	R6	—N/a	UEFA Cup	R1	^{[F]}
2005–06	1D	5th	34	14	10	10	40	32	52	R6	—N/a	–	–	
2006–07	1D	8th	30	11	6	13	41	38	39	R6	—N/a	UEFA Cup	R1	
2007–08	1D	10th	30	9	8	13	23	28	35	R5	R3	–	–	
2008–09	1D	4th	30	15	7	8	47	32	52	SF	R3	–	–	
2009–10	1D	7th	30	10	9	11	36	46	39	R5	R3	UEFA Europa League	GS	^{[G]}
2010–11	1D	6th	30	11	9	10	28	31	42	R4	SF	–	–	
2011–12	1D	7th	30	13	5	12	48	50	44	SF	R3	UEFA Europa League	PO	
2012–13	1D	8th	30	11	7	12	45	51	40	R4	R3	–	–	
2013–14	1D	5th	30	11	12	7	43	33	45	R3	R3	–	–	
2014–15	1D	7th	34	13	8	13	45	46	47	SF	R3	UEFA Europa League	PO	
2015–16	1D	11th	34	10	8	16	40	56	38	QF	R3	–	–	
2016–17	1D	18th	34	4	9	21	22	58	21	R4	R2	–	–	^{[A]}
2017–18	2D	1st	38	19	14	5	72	45	71	R4	R1	–	–	^{[D]}
2018–19	1D	17th	34	7	7	20	33	73	28	R3	R3	–	–	^{[A]}
2019–20	2D	1st	24	14	8	2	36	16	50	R2	R2	–	–	^{[H]}
2020–21	1D	18th	34	6	7	21	30	59	25	R5	–	–	–	^{[A]}
2021–22	2D	6th	34	14	9	11	52	44	51	R3	R1	–	–	
2022–23	2D	13th	34	10	9	15	35	46	39	SF	GS	–	–	
2023–24	2D	2nd	34	21	8	5	66	35	71	R5	R3	–	–	^{[D]}
2024–25	1D	14th	34	9	7	18	32	50	34	R3	QF	–	–	

A. Relegated to the Segunda Liga.
B. Relegated to the Segunda Divisão.
C. Promoted to the Segunda Liga.
D. Promoted to the Primeira Liga.
E. Best Primeira Liga finish.
F. First presence in european competitions.
G. Best finish in european competitions.
H. LigaPro suspended due to COVID-19 pandemic in Portugal

Last updated: 15 May 2021
Div. = Division; 1D = Primeira Liga; 2D = Segunda Liga; 2DS = Segunda Divisão – South Zone
Pos. = Position; Pl = Match played; W = Win; D = Draw; L = Lost; GS = Goal scored; GA = Goal against; Pts = Points
R = Round (Number); QF = Quarter-finals; SF = Semi-finals; PO = Play-off; GS = Group stage

= Champions; = Semi-finals or 3rd place; = Promoted; = Relegated

== European record ==
Season	Competition	Round	Club	Home	Away	Aggregate
2004–05	UEFA Cup	R1	(Spain) Sevilla	1–2	0–2	1–4
2006–07	UEFA Cup	R1	(Romania) Rapid București	1–2	0–1	1–3
2009–10	UEFA Europa League	PO	(Russia) Zenit Saint Petersburg	4–3	1–1	5–4
2009–10	UEFA Europa League	Group L	(Germany) Werder Bremen	2–3	1–4	—N/a
2009–10	UEFA Europa League	Group L	Austria Wien	5–1	1–1	—N/a
2009–10	UEFA Europa League	Group L	(Spain) Athletic Bilbao	1–1	1–2	—N/a
2011–12	UEFA Europa League	2Q	(Iceland) FH Hafnarfjördur	2–0	1–1	3–1
2011–12	UEFA Europa League	3Q	(Sweden) BK Häcken	3–0	1–2	4–2
2011–12	UEFA Europa League	PO	(England) Birmingham City	0–0	0–3	0–3
2014–15	UEFA Europa League	PO	(Belarus) Dinamo Minsk	2–3	0–2	2–5

Last updated: 28 August 2014
Q = Qualifying; PO = Play-off

== Players ==
=== Current squad ===
As of 6 September 2026

Note: Flags indicate national team as defined under FIFA eligibility rules; some limited exceptions apply. Players may hold more than one non-FIFA nationality.

No.	Pos.	Nation	Player
1	GK	ITA	Renato Marin (on loan from Paris Saint-Germain)
2	DF	ECU	Daniel de la Cruz (on loan from LDU Quito)
4	DF	BRA	Ulisses
5	DF	POR	José Gomes (vice-captain)
6	MF	BRA	Matheus Dias
7	MF	DEN	Markus Jensen
8	MF	ESP	Miguel Baeza
9	FW	ECU	Allen Obando (on loan from Inter Miami)
10	FW	BRA	Daniel Júnior
11	FW	CYP	Stavros Gavriil
12	FW	KOR	Song Min-kyu
13	GK	POR	João Gonçalves
14	DF	CPV	Ivanildo Fernandes
15	MF	TUN	Chiheb Labidi
17	FW	BOL	Fernando Nava
20	FW	POR	Matchoi Djaló

No.	Pos.	Nation	Player
21	MF	FRA	William Kokolo (on loan from Hannover 96)
22	MF	POR	Filipe Soares
23	MF	BRA	Mateus Iseppe
26	MF	POR	Joel Silva
28	MF	BRA	Igor Liziero
29	FW	CMR	Njoya Abdel
30	MF	POR	Martim Watts
31	MF	CMR	Danel Dongmo
33	DF	POR	Francisco Gonçalves
34	DF	BRA	Léo Santos (captain)
38	DF	BRA	Zé Vitor (3rd captain)
50	GK	BRA	Kevyn
52	DF	BRA	Wesley Gasolina
88	MF	BRA	Deivison
99	FW	BRA	Pablo Ruan
—	MF	BRA	Josué

== Statistics ==
=== Most appearances ===
As of 11 June 2026

Rank	Player	Appearances	Goals
1	(Portugal) João Aurélio	343	11
2	(Brazil) Serginho	286	116
3	(Portugal) António Vieira	278	20
4	(Portugal) Patacas	267	5
5	(Mozambique) Witi	266	28
6	(Brazil) Cléber	221	3
7	(Portugal) Jota	205	5
8	(Portugal) João Camacho	183	31
9	(Brazil) Felipe Lopes	177	9
10	(Angola) Mateus	153	38

=== Top goalscorers ===
As of 11 June 2026

Rank	Player	Appearances	Goals
1	(Brazil) Serginho	286	116
2	(Honduras) Bryan Róchez	135	49
3	(Brazil) Adriano	100	48
4	(Brazil) Roberto Carlos	127	43
5	(Venezuela) Jesús Ramírez	73	39
6	(Angola) Mateus	153	38
7	(Venezuela) Mario Rondón	135	37
8	(Brazil) Dino Furacão	104	33
9	(Portugal) João Camacho	183	31
10	(Mozambique) Witi	266	28

== Coaching staff ==
Position	Staff
Head coach	(Portugal) Alexandre Santos
Assistant coach	(Portugal) João Peixeiro (Portugal) Marco Sousa
Goalkeeper coach	(Portugal) Vítor Dimas
Match analyst	(Portugal) André Gonçalves
Head of medical	(Portugal) Fernando Jasmins
Physiotherapist	(Portugal) João Sousa
Team manager	(Portugal) Ludgero Castro

== Coaches ==
- (Brazil) Jair Picerni (1989–91)
- (Portugal) Eurico Gomes (1991–92)
- (Portugal) José Rachão (1993–95)
- (Portugal) Rodolfo Reis (1995–96)
- (Brazil) Jair Picerni (1996–98)
- (Portugal) José Alberto Torres (1998–99)
- (Portugal) José Peseiro (1999–03)
- (Brazil) Casemiro Mior (2003–05)
- (Portugal) João Carlos Pereira (2005)
- (Portugal) Manuel Machado (2005–06)
- (Portugal) Carlos Brito (2006–07)
- (Serbia) Predrag Jokanović (2007–08)
- (Portugal) Manuel Machado (2008–10)
- (Serbia) Predrag Jokanović (interim) (2009–10)
- (Serbia) Predrag Jokanović (2010–11)
- (Portugal) Ivo Vieira (2011)
- (Portugal) Pedro Caixinha (2011–12)
- (Portugal) Manuel Machado (2012–2016)
- (Serbia) Predrag Jokanović (2016–2017)
- (Portugal) Costinha (2017–2019)
- (Portugal) Luís Freire (2019–2021)
- (Portugal) Manuel Machado (2021)
- (Portugal) Costinha (2021)
- (Portugal) Rui Borges (2021–2022)
- (Portugal) Filipe Cândido (2022–2023)
- (Portugal) Tiago Margarido (3 July 2023 – 20 May 2026)
- (Portugal) João Gião (26 May 2026 – present)

== Presidents ==
- (Portugal) António Figueira (1910–26)
- (Portugal) Ernesto dos Santos (1926–32)
- (Portugal) António Caldeira (1932–36)
- (Portugal) Consuelo Figueira (1936–40)
- (Portugal) Luís Serrão (1940–44)
- (Portugal) Daniel Machado (1944–48)
- (Portugal) José Abreu (1954–58)
- (Portugal) António Manuel Caldeira (1958–64)
- (Portugal) Fernando Rebelo (1964–65)
- (Portugal) Luís Serrão (1965–69)
- (Portugal) António Manuel Caldeira (1969–73)
- (Portugal) Nélio Mendonça (1973–93)
- (Portugal) Fausto Pereira (1993–94)
- (Portugal) Rui Alves (1994–14)
- (Portugal) João Teixeira (2014–15)
- (Portugal) Rui Alves (2015–)

== Player records ==
=== Most appearances ===
Competitive matches only, includes appearances as used substitute.

Rank	Name	Nat.	Years	League	TP	TL	EL	Total	Ref
1	Serginho	(Brazil)	1994–2004	279	9	0	0	288	
2	Bruno Patacas	(Portugal)	2002–2011	229	21	11	9	270	
3	João Aurélio	(Portugal)	2008–2016	186	22	16	14	238	
4	Ivo Vieira	(Portugal)	1994–2004	205	14	0	0	219	
5	Cléber Monteiro	(Brazil)	2003–2010	183	20	7	4	214	
6	João Fidalgo	(Portugal)	1996–2005	171	11	0	0	182	
7	António Vieira	(Portugal)	1981–1994	162	0	0	0	162	
8	Mateus	(Angola)	2008–2013	117	15	9	12	153	
9	Fernando Ávalos	(Argentina)	2003–2008	132	15	1	3	151	
10	Pedro Paulo	(Brazil)	1996–2001	136	9	0	0	145	

=== Most goals ===
Competitive matches only, includes goals as used substitute.

Rank	Name	Nat.	Years	League	TP	TL	EL	Total	Ref
1	Serginho	(Brazil)	1994–2004	115	4	0	0	119	
2	Adriano	(Brazil)	2002–2005	43	4	0	1	48	
3	Bryan Róchez	(Honduras)	2017–2022	40	1	4	0	45	
4	Roberto Carlos	(Brazil)	1990–1994	40	0	0	0	40	
5	Mateus	(Angola)	2008–2013	28	7	0	3	38	
6	Rui Miguel	(Portugal)	1995–1997	36	1	0	0	37	
6	Mario Rondón	(Venezuela)	2011–2015	31	5	0	1	37	
7	Claudemir	(Brazil)	2010–2014	23	2	2	0	27	
8	Nenê	(Brazil)	2008–2009	20	4	1	0	25	
9	Edmilson	(Brazil)	1988–1991	23	0	0	0	23	
10	André Pinto	(Brazil)	2002–2006	21	0	0	0	21	
10	Diego Barcelos	(Brazil)	2009–2014	18	2	1	0	21	
10	Marco Matias	(Portugal)	2014–2015	17	3	0	1	21	
