= 2024–25 Casa Pia A.C. season =

Casa Pia A.C.
2024–25 season
- Head coach: João Pereira
- Stadium: Estádio Pina Manique
- Primeira Liga: 11th
- Taça de Portugal: Pre-season
- Top goalscorer: League: Cassiano (2); All: Cassiano (2)
- Average home league attendance: 2,043
Home colours	Away colours	Third colours

The 2024–25 season is the 125th season in the history of the Casa Pia A.C., and the club's third consecutive season in Primeira Liga. In addition to the domestic league, the team will participate in the Taça de Portugal.

== Transfers ==
=== In ===
Pos.	Player	Transferred from	Fee	Date	Source
MF	(Portugal) Miguel Sousa	(Portugal) Mafra	Free	1 July 2024	
DF	(Netherlands) Ruben Kluivert	(Netherlands) Dordrecht	€200,000	1 July 2024	
FW	(Portugal) Henrique Pereira	(Portugal) Benfica B	Loan	2 July 2024	
FW	(Guinea-Bissau) Clau Mendes	(Spain) UE Cornellà	Free	3 July 2024	
MF	(Spain) Raúl Blanco	(Spain) Celta Fortuna	Undisclosed	4 July 2024	
DF	(Portugal) João Goulart	(Portugal) Mafra	Free	5 July 2024	
DF	(Portugal) José Fonte	(Portugal) Braga	Free	10 July 2024	
MF	(Bulgaria) Andrian Kraev	(Bulgaria) Levski Sofia	Undisclosed	23 July 2024	
GK	(Costa Rica) Patrick Sequeira	(Spain) UD Ibiza	Undisclosed	25 July 2024	
FW	(Spain) Max Svensson	(Spain) RCD Espanyol		7 August 2024	
FW	(Ghana) Samuel Obeng	(Spain) Real Oviedo	Free	7 August 2024	

=== Out ===
Pos.	Player	Transferred to	Fee	Date	Source
MF	(Portugal) Samuel Justo	(Portugal) Sporting CP B	Loan return	30 June 2024	
MF	(Portugal) André Lacximicant	(Portugal) Braga B	Loan return	30 June 2024	
FW	(Japan) Yuki Soma	(Japan) Nagoya Grampus	Loan return	30 June 2024	
GK	(Brazil) Lucas Paes	(Portugal) Torreense	End of contract	1 July 2024	
DF	(Brazil) João Nunes	(Hungary) Újpest FC	End of contract	1 July 2024	
MF	(Brazil) Ângelo Neto	(Portugal) Farense	End of contract	1 July 2024	
DF	(Cape Verde) Fernando Varela	(Portugal) Alverca	End of contract	1 July 2024	
MF	(Norway) Kevin Martin Krygård	(Norway) Lillestrøm	€800,000	17 July 2024	
FW	(Brazil) Felippe Cardoso	(Russia) Akhmat Grozny	€1,500,000	25 July 2024	

== Friendlies ==
=== Pre-season ===
6 July 2024 Friendly	Casa Pia (Portugal)	0–0	(Portugal) Caldas

12 July 2024 Friendly	Casa Pia (Portugal)	4–1	(Portugal) 1º Dezembro

24 July 2024 Friendly	Boavista (Portugal)	v	(Portugal) Casa Pia

== Competitions ==
=== Overall record ===
Competition	First match	Last match	Starting round	Record							
Competition	First match	Last match	Starting round	Pld	W	D	L	GF	GA	GD	Win %
Primeira Liga	9–12 August 2024	May 2025	Matchday 1	15	5	5	5	16	18	−2	33.33
Taça de Portugal	19 October 2024		Third round	2	2	0	0	8	0	+8	100.00
Total				17	7	5	5	24	18	+6	41.18

Last updated: 28 December 2024
Source: Pia/1685/ Soccerway

=== Primeira Liga ===
==== League table ====
Pos	Team	Pld	W	D	L	GF	GA	GD	Pts
7	Famalicão	34	12	11	11	44	39	+5	47
8	Estoril	34	12	10	12	48	53	−5	46
9	Casa Pia	34	12	9	13	39	44	−5	45
10	Moreirense	34	10	10	14	42	50	−8	40
11	Rio Ave	34	9	11	14	39	55	−16	38

Source: Liga Portugal
Rules for classification: 1) Points; 2) Head-to-head points; 3) Head-to-head goal difference; 4) Goal difference; 5) Matches won; 6) Goals scored; 7) Play-off.

==== Matches ====
The match schedule was released on 7 July 2024.

10 August 2024 1	Casa Pia	0–1	Boavista	Rio Maior
18:00 WEST (UTC+1)	Zolotić (yellow card) 5'; Segovia (yellow card) 28'	Report	Bozenik (yellow card) 65'; Reisinho 77' (pen.)	Stadium: Estádio Municipal de Rio Maior; Attendance: 1.140; Referee: Pedro Ramalho

17 August 2024 2	Benfica	3–0	Casa Pia	Lisbon
20:30 WEST (UTC+1)	Pavlidis 70'; Gouveia 80'; Aursnes 90'	Report	Segovia (yellow card) 67'	Stadium: Estádio da Luz; Attendance: 58,926; Referee: Iancu Vasilica (Vila Real)

24 August 2024 3	Casa Pia	0–2	Santa Clara	Rio Maior
15:30 WEST (UTC+1)	Fonte (yellow card) 73'; Svensson (yellow card) 78'; M. Santos (yellow card) 83'; Larrazabal (yellow card) 84' (yellow-red card) 88'	Report	Rocha (yellow card) 28'; Silva 57'; Safira (yellow card) 61'; Ferreira (yellow card) 78'; Batista (yellow card) 79'; V. Matos (yellow card) 90+4'; Ricardinho 90+5'	Stadium: Estádio Municipal de Rio Maior; Attendance: 1.188; Referee: Ricardo Baixinho

31 August 2024 4	Estrela da Amadora	0–1	Casa Pia	Amadora
18:00	Lopes (yellow card) 90+2'	Report	Tchamba (yellow card) 49'; Pereira 61'; Marco Santos (red card) 71'	Stadium: Estádio José Gomes; Attendance: 3.471; Referee: Hélder Carvalho

14 September 2024 5	Casa Pia	3–1	Moreirense	Rio Maior
15:30 WEST (UTC+1)	Tchamba 58'; Blanco 70', (yellow card) 77'; Geraldes (yellow card) 76'; Kraev (yellow card) 77'; Moreira 81'; Kluivert (yellow card) 90+5'; Sequeira (yellow card) 90+5'	Report	Madson 35'; Ismael (yellow card) 51'; Frimpong (yellow card) 90+2'	Stadium: Estádio Municipal de Rio Maior; Attendance: 1.248; Referee: David Silva

27 September 2024 6	Gil Vicente	1–1	Casa Pia	Barcelos
15:30 WEST (UTC+1)	Fujimoto 43'; Cruz (yellow card) 82'; Touré (yellow card) 90+8'	Report	Tchamba (yellow card) 12'; Fonte (yellow card) 24'; Cassiano 85' (pen.), (yellow card) 90+5'; Sequeira (yellow card) 90+5'; Larrazabal (yellow card) 90+5'	Stadium: Estádio Cidade de Barcelos; Attendance: 3.825; Referee: Gustavo Correia

28 September 2024 7	Casa Pia	1–1	Vitória Guimarães	Rio Maior
18:00 WEST (UTC+1)	Cassiano 39' (pen.); Goulart (yellow card) 45'; Zolotić (yellow card) 51'	Report	Goulart 49' (o.g.); R. Borges (yellow card) 54'	Stadium: Estádio Municipal de Rio Maior; Attendance: 2.632; Referee: Carlos Macedo

5 October 2024 8	Sporting CP	2–0	Casa Pia	Lisbon
20:30 WEST (UTC+01:00)	Bragança 39', (yellow card) 82'; Gyökeres 80' (pen.)	Report	Zolotić (yellow card) 36'; J. Pereira (yellow card) 71'; Kluivert (yellow card) 78'	Stadium: Estádio José Alvalade; Attendance: 42,887; Referee: Miguel Nogueira

25 October 2024 9	Casa Pia	1–0	Nacional	Rio Maior
18:45	Kluivert 39'; Brito (yellow card) 48'; Batista (red card) 82'; Beni (yellow card) 89'; Zolotić (yellow card) 90+1'; J. Cardoso (red card) 90+9'	Report	Gomes (yellow card) 62'; Ulisses (yellow card) 77'; G. Rodrigues (red card) 83'; Thomas (yellow card) 86'	Stadium: Estádio Municipal de Rio Maior; Attendance: 1.004; Referee: David Silva

2 November 2024 10	Rio Ave	2–2	Casa Pia	Vila do Conde
15:30 WEST (UTC+1)	Clayton 16'; N. Silva (yellow card) 23'; Richards (yellow card) 35'; Neto 39'; Santos (yellow card) 69'; T. Lopes (red card) 75'; Vrousai (yellow card) 82'	Report	Moreira 3'; Cassiano 28'; Segovia (yellow card) 43'; Brito (yellow card) 85'; Kraev (yellow card) 90+5'	Stadium: Estádio do Rio Ave FC; Attendance: 2.323; Referee: António Nobre

9 November 2024 11	Casa Pia	1-1	Farense	Rio Maior
15.30 WET (UTC±0)	Cassiano 32' (pen.)	Report	Baldé 7'; Sandro (yellow card) 42'	Stadium: Estádio Municipal de Rio Maior; Attendance: 1.202; Referee: Carlos Macedo

2 December 2024 12	Porto	2–0	Casa Pia	Porto
20:45 WET (UTC±00:00)	Vieira 51'; Omorodion 55'; Borges (yellow card) 88'; Sousa (yellow card) 90+6'; Otávio (yellow card) 90+8'	Report		Stadium: Estádio do Dragão; Attendance: 32,810; Referee: Hélder Malheiro

8 December 2024 13	Casa Pia	1-1	AVS	Rio Maior
18:00	Goulart 12'	Report	Silva (yellow card) 34'; Devenish (yellow card) 49'; Rodríguez (yellow card) 53'; Assunção 72' (pen.), (yellow card) 84'	Stadium: Estádio Municipal de Rio Maior; Attendance: 1.147; Referee: Bruno José Costa

15 December 2024 14	Estoril	0-2	Casa Pia	Estoril
20:30	Costa (yellow card) 38'; Garcia (yellow card) 40'; Boma (yellow card) 61'	Report	Segovia 56'; Livolant (yellow card) 61'; Cassiano 63'; Goulart (yellow card) 68'	Stadium: Estádio António Coimbra da Mota; Attendance: - Referee: Tiago Martins

20 December 2024 15	Casa Pia	3–1	Arouca	Rio Maior
20:15 WEST (UTC+01:00)	Livolant 19'; Lelo 20'; Cassiano (yellow card) 61'; Obeng 88'; Beni (yellow card) 90+1'	Report	Sylla (yellow card) 18'; Weverson (yellow card) 58'; Trezza 63'; Simão (yellow card) 75'	Stadium: Estádio Municipal de Rio Maior; Attendance: 912; Referee: Anzhony Rodrigues

29 December 2014 16	Braga	–	Casa Pia	Braga
18:00 WEST (UTC+1)		Report		Stadium: Estádio Municipal de Braga; Attendance: - Referee: -

=== Taça de Portugal ===
19 October 2024 Third round	Amora	0–5	Casa Pia	Amora
16:00 WEST (UTC+01:00)	Antunes (yellow card) 18'; Batalha (yellow card) 36'; Duque (yellow card) 53'; Correia (yellow card) 62' (yellow-red card) 80'	Report	Goulart (yellow card) 13'; Benaissa-Yahia (yellow card) 30'; Cassiano (yellow card) 49'; Moreira 57', 75', 82'; Svensson 84', 90' (pen.)	Stadium: Estádio da Medideira; Attendance: - Referee: Ricardo Baixinho

23 November 2024 Fourth round	Casa Pia	3–0	Chaves	Rio Maior
21:15 WEST (UTC+01:00)	Cassiano 2'; Moreira 44' (pen.), (yellow card) 23'; Larrazabal (yellow card) 48'; Livolant 56'; Sousa (yellow card) 70'; Kluivert (yellow card) 79'	Report	Carraça (yellow card) 36'; Pius (yellow card) 42'; Batista 45'; Pinho (yellow card) 48'; Morim (red card) 70'; Kusso (yellow card) 85'; Platiny (yellow card) 90'	Stadium: Estádio Municipal de Rio Maior; Attendance: - Referee: Bruno Vieira

12 January 2025 Fifth round	Casa Pia	–	Rio Ave	Rio Maior
16:45 WEST (UTC+01:00)				Stadium: Estádio Municipal de Rio Maior; Attendance: - Referee: -
