= 2023–24 Casa Pia A.C. season =

Casa Pia A.C.
2023–24 season
- Chairman: Victor Franco
- Manager: Filipe Martins (until 13 November); Pedro Moreira (from 20 November to 15 February); Gonçalo Santos (from 16 February)
- Stadium: Estádio Pina Manique
- Primeira Liga: 9th
- Taça de Portugal: Fourth round
- Taça da Liga: Third round
- Top goalscorer: League: Clayton (8); All: Clayton (12)
- Biggest win: 0–4 v Vizela (Away); 31 March 2024 (Liga Portugal)
- Biggest defeat: 8–0 v Sporting CP (Away); 29 January 2024 (Liga Portugal)
Home colours	Away colours	Third colours

The 2023–24 season was Casa Pia A.C.'s 104th season in existence and second consecutive in the Primeira Liga, the top division of association football in Portugal. They also competed in the Taça de Portugal and the Taça da Liga.

== Players ==
=== First-team squad ===
As of 10 August 2023

Note: Flags indicate national team as defined under FIFA eligibility rules; some limited exceptions apply. Players may hold more than one non-FIFA nationality.

No.	Pos.	Nation	Player
1	GK	POR	Afonso Monteiro
2	DF	CMR	Duplexe Tchamba
3	DF	POR	João Nunes
5	DF	POR	Leonardo Lelo
6	DF	BRA	Derick Poloni
7	FW	NGR	Saviour Godwin
8	MF	BRA	Ângelo Neto
9	FW	BRA	Rafael Martins
10	MF	POR	Diogo Pinto
11	FW	JPN	Yuki Soma (on loan from Nagoya Grampus)
13	DF	POR	Vasco Fernandes (captain)
15	DF	CPV	Fernando Varela
16	MF	ANG	Beni Mukendi
17	MF	POR	Rafael Brito

No.	Pos.	Nation	Player
18	DF	POR	André Geraldes
19	MF	BIH	Nermin Zolotić
20	FW	POR	Kiki Silva
30	FW	BRA	Felippe Cardoso
33	GK	POR	Ricardo Batista
37	MF	POR	Samuel Ceita
38	FW	BRA	Fernando Andrade
44	DF	POR	Isaac Monteiro
68	GK	BRA	Lucas Paes
72	MF	ESP	Gaizka Larrazabal
77	DF	POR	Tiago Dias
79	FW	BRA	Jajá (on loan from Athletico Paranaense)
80	MF	BRA	Pablo Roberto
99	FW	BRA	Clayton

=== Out on loan ===
Note: Flags indicate national team as defined under FIFA eligibility rules; some limited exceptions apply. Players may hold more than one non-FIFA nationality.

No.	Pos.	Nation	Player
—	DF	VEN	Eduardo Fereira (at Academia Puerto Cabello until 30 June 2024)

== Transfers ==
=== In ===
Pos.	Player	Transferred from	Fee	Date	Source
FW	(Japan) Yuki Soma	(Japan) Nagoya Grampus	Loan	20 July 2023	
MF	(Brazil) Pablo Roberto	(Brazil) Vila Nova	€225,000	30 July 2023	
FW	(Brazil) Jajá	(Brazil) Athletico Paranaense	Loan	5 August 2023	

=== Out ===
Pos.	Player	Transferred to	Fee	Date	Source
FW	(Japan) Takahiro Kunimoto	(Malaysia) Johor Darul Ta'zim	Undisclosed	2 August 2023	
MF	(Cameroon) Yan Eteki	(Spain) Alcorcón	Free	8 August 2023	
MF	(Portugal) Diogo Pinto	(Slovenia) Olimpija Ljubljana	Undisclosed	18 August 2023	
MF	(Brazil) Derick Poloni	(Spain) Eldense	Undisclosed	20 August 2023	

== Pre-season and friendlies ==
Win Draw Loss Fixtures

15 July 2023 Friendly	Estrela da Amadora (Portugal)	1–1	(Portugal) Casa Pia	Amadora
10:00 UTC+1	Tavares 30'		Cardoso 65' (pen.)	Stadium: Estádio José Gomes

19 July 2023 Friendly	Moreirense (Portugal)	0–1	(Portugal) Casa Pia
10:00 UTC+1			Nunes 35'

== Competitions ==
=== Overall record ===
Competition	First match	Last match	Starting round	Final position	Record							
Competition	First match	Last match	Starting round	Final position	Pld	W	D	L	GF	GA	GD	Win %
Primeira Liga	12 August 2023	May 2024	Matchday 1		22	6	5	11	20	35	−15	27.27
Taça de Portugal	21 October 2023	25 November 2023	Fourth round	Fourth round	2	1	1	0	2	0	+2	50.00
Taça da Liga	23 July 2023	1 November 2023	First round	Third round	4	3	1	0	7	2	+5	75.00
Total					28	10	7	11	29	37	−8	35.71

Last updated: 18 February 2024
Source: Soccerway

=== Primeira Liga ===
==== League table ====
Pos	Team	Pld	W	D	L	GF	GA	GD	Pts
7	Arouca	34	13	7	14	54	50	+4	46
8	Famalicão	34	10	12	12	37	41	−4	42
9	Casa Pia	34	10	8	16	38	50	−12	38
10	Farense	34	10	7	17	46	51	−5	37 (Note: Head-to-head points: Farense 4, Rio Ave 1.)
11	Rio Ave	34	6	19	9	38	43	−5	37

Source: Liga Portugal
Rules for classification: 1) Points; 2) Head-to-head points; 3) Head-to-head goal difference; 4) Head-to-head away goals scored; 5) Goal difference; 6) Matches won; 7) Goals scored; 8) Play-off.

==== Results summary ====
Overall								Home						Away					
Pld	W	D	L	GF	GA	GD	Pts	W	D	L	GF	GA	GD	W	D	L	GF	GA	GD
34	10	8	16	38	50	−12	38	3	5	9	10	18	−8	7	3	7	28	32	−4

Last updated: 17 May 2024.
Source: Liga Portugal

==== Results by round ====
Round	1	2	3	4	5	6	7	8	9	10	11	12	13	14	15	16	17	18	19	20	21	22	23	24	25	26	27	28	29	30	31	32	33	34
Ground	A	H	A	H	A	H	A	H	A	H	A	H	A	A	H	A	H	H	A	H	A	H	A	H	A	H	A	H	A	H	H	A	H	A
Result	W	L	D	D	W	D	L	L	D	L	L	W	L	W	L	W	L	L	L	D	L	W	W	D	L	L	W	D	D	L	W	L	L	W
Position	2	8	8	9	6	8	10	10	13	13	15	11	13	10	12	8	10	12	13	14	16	12	11	10	11	12	9	9	9	9	9	9	9	9

Updated to match(es) played on 17 May 2024. Source: Liga Portugal
A = Away; H = Home; W = Win; D = Draw; L = Loss

==== Matches ====
The league fixtures were unveiled on 5 July 2023.

12 August 2023 1	Farense	0–3	Casa Pia	Faro
18:00 UTC+1		Report		Stadium: Estádio de São Luís; Attendance: 3,953; Referee: Bruno Vieira

18 August 2023 2	Casa Pia	1–2	Sporting CP	Rio Maior
20:15 UTC+1	Clayton 59'	Report	Paulinho 3', 61'	Stadium: Estádio Municipal de Rio Maior; Attendance: 6,981; Referee: Nuno Almeida

27 August 2023 3	Boavista	1–1	Casa Pia	Porto
15:30 WET	Pedro Malheiro (yellow card) 35' (goal) 48'	Report	Clayton 33'	Stadium: Estádio do Bessa; Attendance: 4,945; Referee: (Portugal) Bruno Pires Costa

2 September 2023 4	Casa Pia	1–1	Rio Ave	Rio Maior
15:30 WET	Pablo Roberto 13'; Clayton (yellow card) 75'	Report	Joca 52'; João Graça (yellow card) 77'; Pantalon (yellow card) 90+4'	Stadium: Estádio Municipal de Rio Maior; Attendance: 3,267; Referee: (Portugal) David Silva

17 September 2023 5	Arouca	0–1	Casa Pia	Arouca
15:30 WET	Cristo González (yellow card) 44'; Javi Montero (yellow card) 82'	Report	Vasco Fernandes (yellow card) 11'; Beni Mukendi (yellow card) 83'; Felippe Cardoso 90+1' (yellow card) 90+3'	Stadium: Estádio Municipal de Arouca; Attendance: 1,346; Referee: (Portugal) André Narciso

23 September 2023 6	Casa Pia	0–0	Vitória de Guimarães	Rio Maior
18:00 WET	Gaizka Larrazabal (yellow card) 57'; Vasco Fernandes (yellow card) 80'; Serobyan (yellow card) 90+4'	Report	João Mendes (yellow card) 36'; Manu Silva (yellow card) 63'	Stadium: Estádio Municipal de Rio Maior; Attendance: 3,830; Referee: (Portugal) João Pinheiro

2 October 2023 7	Gil Vicente	2–0	Casa Pia	Barcelos
20:15 WET	Gabriel Pereira (yellow card) 40'; Dominguez (yellow card) 52'; Zé Carlos 61'; Depú 78'; Pedro Tiba (yellow card) 90+4'	Report	Gaizka Larrazabal (yellow card) 13'; Soma (yellow card) 20'; Pablo Roberto (yellow card) 52' (red card) 57'	Stadium: Estádio Cidade de Barcelos; Attendance: 2,702; Referee: (Portugal) Hélder Carvalho

8 October 2023 8	Casa Pia	0–1	Estrela	Rio Maior
15:30 WET	Ângelo Neto (yellow card) 16'	Report	Ronaldo Tavares 90+3' (yellow card) 90+4'	Stadium: Estádio Municipal de Rio Maior; Attendance: 2,861; Referee: (Portugal) José Bessa

28 October 2023 9	Benfica	1–1	Casa Pia	Lisbon
18:00 WET	João Mário 44'; Florentino Luís (yellow card) 73'	Report	Gaizka Larrazabal (yellow card) 41' (goal) 81'; Pablo Roberto (yellow card) 72'	Stadium: Estádio da Luz; Attendance: 57,240; Referee: (Portugal) Claúdio Pereira

5 November 2023 10	Casa Pia	0–1	Vizela	Rio Maior
15:30 WET	Ângelo Neto (yellow card) 17'; Zolotić (yellow card) 67'; Pablo Roberto (yellow card) 77'	Report	Rodrigo Escoval (yellow card) 33'; Essende (yellow card) 52'; Lacava (yellow card) 57'; Alberto Soro 70'	Stadium: Estádio Municipal de Rio Maior; Attendance: 1,586; Referee: (Portugal) David Silva

10 November 2023 11	Estoril	4–0	Casa Pia	Estoril
20:15 WET	Marqués 1'; João Marques (yellow card) 14'; Guitane 24'; Holsgrove (yellow card) 64'; Rodrigo Gomes 69' (yellow card) 73'; Cassiano 90+5'	Report	Ângelo Neto (yellow card) 32'; Pablo Roberto (yellow card) 36'; Felippe Cardoso (yellow card) 82'; Beni Mukendi (yellow card) 90+3'	Stadium: Estádio António Coimbra da Mota; Attendance: 2,896; Referee: (Portugal) Fábio Melo

2 December 2023 12	Casa Pia	1–0	Portimonense	Rio Maior
20:30 WET	Samuel Justo (yellow card) 13' (goal) 55'; Tiago Dias (yellow card) 42'; André Geraldes (yellow card) 90+4'	Report	Pedrão (yellow card) 67'; Jasper (yellow card) 74'; Hélio Varela (yellow card) 90+3'; Midana Cassamá (red card) 90+5'	Stadium: Estádio Municipal de Rio Maior; Attendance: 1,187; Referee: (Portugal) Gustavo Correia

9 December 2023 13	Porto	3–1	Casa Pia	Porto
20:30 WET	Evanilson 12' (yellow card) 36'; Varela (yellow card) 39'; Zé Pedro 49'; Pepe 81'; Sánchez (yellow card) 88'	Report	Fernando Andrade 89' (pen.); Pablo Roberto (yellow card) 90+2'	Stadium: Estádio do Dragão; Attendance: 29,130; Referee: (Portugal) João Ferreira

17 December 2023 14	Chaves	1–3	Casa Pia	Chaves
15:30 WET	Bruno Langa (yellow card) 29'; Jô 45'	Report	Clayton 20' 82'; Tiago Dias 23'; Felippe Cardoso (yellow card) 52'	Stadium: Estádio Municipal Eng. Manuel Branco Teixeira; Attendance: 1,980; Referee: (Portugal) Iancu Vasilica

30 December 2023 15	Casa Pia	1–3	Braga	Rio Maior
18:00 WET	Clayton 74' (pen.); Beni Mukendi (yellow card) 90+6'	Report	João Moutinho 51'; Banza 77'; Zalazar 88'	Stadium: Estádio Municipal de Rio Maior; Attendance: 4,153; Referee: (Portugal) Tiago Martins

8 January 2024 16	Moreirense	1–4	Casa Pia	Moreira de Cónegos
20:15 WET	Matheus Aiás 14'; João Camacho (yellow card) 40'; Antonisse (yellow card) 90+5'	Report	Soma 18'; Felippe Cardoso 26' (yellow card) 35' (goal) 56'; João Nunes 39'; Segovia (yellow card) 90+5'	Stadium: Parque de Jogos Comendador Joaquim de Almeida Freitas; Attendance: 944; Referee: (Portugal) Ricardo Baixinho

13 January 2024 17	Casa Pia	0–2	Famalicão	Rio Maior
15:30	Clayton (yellow card) 25'; Ricardo Batista (red card) 86'	Report	Chiquinho 45+1'; Youssouf (yellow card) 61'; Cádiz 66'	Stadium: Estádio Municipal de Rio Maior; Attendance: 1,240; Referee: (Portugal) Fábio Melo

20 January 2024 18	Casa Pia	1–3	Farense	Rio Maior
18:00	Fernando Andrade 87'	Report	Marco Matias 24'; Muscat 40' (yellow card) 90+5'; Bruno Duarte 75'	Stadium: Estádio Municipal de Rio Maior; Attendance: 1,726; Referee: (Portugal) Carlos Macedo

29 January 2024 19	Sporting CP	8–0	Casa Pia	Lisbon
20:45	Coates 14', 81'; Gyökeres 23', 32' (pen.); Gonçalves 25'; Trincão 43', 90+4'; Catamo 64'			Stadium: Estádio José Alvalade; Referee: Hélder Carvalho

5 February 2024 20	Casa Pia	0–0	Boavista	Rio Maior
20:15	Nuno Moreira (yellow card) 45+1'; Ângelo Neto (yellow card) 60'; Felippe Cardoso (yellow card) 75'	Report	Sasso (yellow card) 59'	Stadium: Estádio Municipal de Rio Maior; Attendance: 1,261; Referee: (Portugal) Iancu Vasilica

11 February 2024 21	Rio Ave	1–0	Casa Pia	Vila do Conde
15:30	Yakubu 88'	Report		Stadium: Estádio dos Arcos; Attendance: 2,682; Referee: (Portugal) Carlos Macedo

18 February 2024 22	Casa Pia	1–0	Arouca	Rio Maior
15:30	Clayton 74'	Report	Javi Montero (yellow card) 64'; David Simão (yellow card) 71'	Stadium: Estádio Municipal de Rio Maior; Attendance: 1,244; Referee: (Portugal) José Bessa

25 February 2024 23	Vitória de Guimarães	0–2	Casa Pia	Guimarães
16:00	André André (yellow card) 51'	Report	Clayton 4' (yellow card) 71'; Pablo Roberto 35'; Tchamba (yellow card) 49'; Ângelo Neto (yellow card) 62'	Stadium: Estádio D. Afonso Henriques; Attendance: 13,689; Referee: (Portugal) Bruno Pires Costa

3 March 2024 24	Casa Pia	0–0	Gil Vicente	Rio Maior
15:30 WET	Ângelo Neto (yellow card) 45+2'	Report	Pedro Tiba (yellow card) 34'; Gabriel Pereira (yellow card) 90'	Stadium: Estádio Municipal de Rio Maior; Attendance: 1,253; Referee: (Portugal) Manuel Oliveira

8 March 2024 25	Estrela	3–1	Casa Pia	Amadora
20:45 WET	Kikas 57' 75'; André Luiz 90+1'	Report	Rúben Lameiras (yellow card) 77'; Soma 86'; Tchamba (yellow card) 90+4'	Stadium: Estádio José Gomes; Attendance: 1,972; Referee: (Portugal) António Nobre

17 March 2024 26	Casa Pia	0–1	Benfica	Rio Maior
18:00 WET		Report	Florentino Luís (yellow card) 45'; Arthur Cabral 74'; António Silva (yellow card) 77'	Stadium: Estádio Municipal de Rio Maior; Attendance: 6,925; Referee: (Portugal) Claúdio Pereira

31 March 2024 27	Vizela	0–4	Casa Pia	Vizela
18:00 WET	Diogo Nascimento (yellow card) 27'; Alberto Soro (yellow card) 54'	Report	Ângelo Neto (yellow card) 18' (goal) 25'; Segovia (yellow card) 40'; Ricardo Batista (yellow card) 41'; Felippe Cardoso 57' 70'; Fernando Varela (yellow card) 63'; Tchamba (yellow card) 65' (yellow-red card) 76'; Gaizka Larrazabal 90+1'	Stadium: Estádio do Futebol Clube de Vizela; Attendance: 2,235; Referee: (Portugal) Fábio Melo

8 April 2024 28	Casa Pia	0–0	Estoril	Rio Maior
20:15 WET		Report	João Basso (yellow card) 72'; Mateus Fernandes (yellow card) 83'	Stadium: Estádio Municipal de Rio Maior; Attendance: 1,391; Referee: (Portugal) Miguel Nogueira

14 April 2024 29	Portimonense	2–2	Casa Pia	Portimão
18:00 WET	Tamble 8'; Alemão 26'; Igor Formiga (yellow card) 58'; Nakamura (yellow card) 60'	Report	Tchamba (yellow card) 25'; Soma 34'; Nuno Moreira (yellow card) 47'; Zolotić 59'; Beni Mukendi (yellow card) 87' (yellow-red card) 90+4'	Stadium: Estádio Municipal de Portimão; Attendance: 1,683; Referee: (Portugal) Tiago Martins (referee)

21 April 2024 30	Casa Pia	1–2	Porto	Rio Maior
18:00 WET	Nuno Moreira 37'; Ângelo Neto (yellow card) 58'; Zolotić (yellow card) 66'; Gaizka Larrazabal (yellow card) 78'	Report	Galeno 31'; Nico González 56'; Wendell (yellow card) 90+7'	Stadium: Estádio Municipal de Rio Maior; Attendance: 3,387; Referee: (Portugal) Manuel Oliveira

27 April 2024 31	Casa Pia	3–1	Chaves	Rio Maior
15:30 WET	Tchamba 44'; Ângelo Neto (yellow card) 45+3'; Soma 67' (yellow card) 67'; Segovia (yellow card) 73'; André Lacximicant 90+6'	Report	Raphael Guzzo (yellow card) 45+3'; Vasco Fernandes (yellow card) 56'; Nwakali 65'; João Correia (yellow card) 69'; Leandro Sanca (yellow card) 89'	Stadium: Estádio Municipal de Rio Maior; Attendance: 1,044; Referee: (Portugal) João Ferreira

5 May 2024 32	Braga	4–3	Casa Pia	Braga
18:00 WET	Álvaro Djaló 12' (yellow card) 74' (yellow-red card) 75'; Paulo Oliveira (yellow card) 56'; Abel Ruiz 60' 88'; Zalazar 64'; Bruma (yellow card) 90+2'	Report	Soma 35' (yellow card) 36'; Leonardo Lelo 51'; Paulo Oliveira 72' (o.g.); Tchamba (yellow card) 83'; Felippe Cardoso (yellow card) 90+2'; Rúben Lameiras (yellow card) 90+2'	Stadium: Estádio Municipal de Braga; Attendance: 10,894; Referee: (Portugal) Tiago Martins (referee)

12 May 2024 33	Casa Pia	0–1	Moreirense	Rio Maior
18:00 WET	Beni Mukendi (yellow card) 29'; Pablo Roberto (yellow card) 60'	Report	Gonçalo Franco 33'; João Camacho (yellow card) 61'; Luis Nlavo (yellow card) 62'	Stadium: Estádio Municipal de Rio Maior; Attendance: 1,837; Referee: (Portugal) José Bessa

17 May 2024 34	Famalicão	1–2	Casa Pia	Vila Nova de Famalicão
18:45 WET	Youssouf 4'; Chiquinho (yellow card) 51'; Gustavo Sá (yellow card) 60'; Francisco Moura (yellow card) 60'; Nathan Santos (yellow card) 70'	Report	Felippe Cardoso 22' (yellow card) 27'; Beni Mukendi (yellow card) 45+3'; Nuno Moreira 56'; Segovia (yellow card) 60'; Ângelo Neto (yellow card) 85'; Lucas Paes (yellow card) 90+7'	Stadium: Estádio Municipal 22 de Junho; Attendance: 3,115; Referee: (Portugal) Bruno Vieira

=== Taça de Portugal ===
21 October 2023 Third round	Rabo de Peixe	0–2	Casa Pia	Rabo de Peixe
16:00 WET	Desailly (yellow card) 68'	Report	Serobyan 28'; Soma (yellow card) 41'; Pablo Roberto 52'	Stadium: Campo de Jogos Bom Jesus; Referee: (Portugal) Manuel Oliveira

25 November 2023 Fourth round	Nacional	0–0 (6–5 p)	Casa Pia	Funchal
15:00 WET	André Sousa (yellow card) 12'; Luís Esteves (yellow card) 19'; João Aurélio (yellow card) 42'; Jordi Pola (yellow card) 83'; Gustavo Silva (yellow card) 88'; Danilović (yellow card) 96'	Report	Leonardo Lelo (yellow card) 30'; Pablo Roberto (yellow card) 74'; Clayton (yellow card) 80'; Ricardo Batista (yellow card) 105+1'; Gaizka Larrazabal (yellow card) 105+2'	Stadium: Estádio da Madeira; Referee: (Portugal) Carlos Macedo

=== Taça da Liga ===
23 July 2023 First round	Länk Vilaverdense	0–2	Casa Pia	Paços de Ferreira
18:00 UTC+1		Report		Stadium: Estádio Capital do Móvel; Attendance: 390; Referee: João Gonçalves

30 July 2023 Second round	Torreense	0–2	Casa Pia	Torres Vedras
18:00 UTC+1		Report		Stadium: Estádio Manuel Marques; Attendance: 1,087; Referee: João Pedro Afonso

=== Group A ===
Pos	Team	Pld	W	D	L	GF	GA	GD	Pts	Qualification	BRA	CAS	NAC
1	Braga	2	1	1	0	4	2	+2	4	Advance to knockout phase	—	1–1	—
2	Casa Pia	2	1	1	0	3	2	+1	4		—	—	2–1
3	Nacional	2	0	0	2	2	5	−3	0		1–3	—	—

Source: Liga Portugal
Rules for classification: Tiebreakers

28 September 2023 Match 1	Casa Pia	2-1	Nacional	Rio Maior
20:15 WET	Felippe Cardoso (yellow card) 15' (goal) 55'; Isaac Monteiro (yellow card) 37'; Ângelo Neto (yellow card) 42'; Leonardo Lelo (yellow card) 72'; Clayton 90+4'	Report	Witi 3'; Carlos Daniel (yellow card) 48'	Stadium: Estádio Municipal de Rio Maior; Attendance: 1,314; Referee: (Portugal) Miguel Nogueira

1 November 2023 Match 2	Braga	1-1	Casa Pia	Braga
20:15 WET	Pizzi 62'; Paulo Oliveira (yellow card) 74'	Report	Lucas Paes (yellow card) 43'; Clayton 76' (pen.); Pablo Roberto (yellow card) 90+1'	Stadium: Estádio Municipal de Braga; Attendance: 6,005; Referee: (Portugal) André Narciso
