= 2022–23 Casa Pia A.C. season =

Casa Pia A.C.
2022–23 season
- Chairman: Victor Franco
- Manager: Filipe Martins
- Stadium: Estádio Dr. Magalhães Pessoa
- Primeira Liga: 10th
- Taça de Portugal: Quarter-finals
- Taça da Liga: Group stage
- Top goalscorer: League: Rafael Martins (6); All: Rafael Martins (9)
- Biggest win: 2–3 v Paços de Ferreira (Away); 11 September 2022 (Liga Portugal)
- Biggest defeat: 2–5 v Nacional (Away); 9 February 2023 (Taça de Portugal)
Home colours

The 2022–23 season is the 103rd in the history of Casa Pia A.C. and their first season back in the top flight since 1939. The club will participate in the Primeira Liga, the Taça de Portugal, and the Taça da Liga.

== Players ==
As of 23 July 2022

Note: Flags indicate national team as defined under FIFA eligibility rules; some limited exceptions apply. Players may hold more than one non-FIFA nationality.

No.	Pos.	Nation	Player
1	GK	BRA	João Victor
5	DF	POR	Leonardo Lelo
6	DF	BRA	Derick Poloni
8	MF	BRA	Ângelo Neto
10	MF	GBS	Zidane Banjaqui
11	FW	POR	Jota Silva
12	DF	BRA	Rodrigo Galo
13	DF	POR	Vasco Fernandes
14	FW	HAI	Carnejy Antoine
16	MF	CPV	Cuca
17	DF	NGR	Kelechi John
18	MF	POR	Víto

No.	Pos.	Nation	Player
19	MF	BIH	Nermin Zolotić
22	DF	MLT	Zach Muscat
27	MF	POR	Afonso Taira
29	FW	POR	João Vieira
33	GK	ANG	Ricardo Batista
55	MF	CPV	Nuno Borges
68	GK	BRA	Lucas Paes
74	MF	KOR	Kang-min Choi
91	DF	BRA	Hebert
97	FW	NGR	Saviour Godwin
—	DF	CPV	Fernando Varela
—	MF	POR	Diogo Pinto
—	MF	JPN	Takahiro Kunimoto

== Pre-season and friendlies ==
Win Draw Loss Fixtures

4 July 2022 Friendly	Sporting CP (Portugal)	1–1	(Portugal) Casa Pia	TBD
10:00 WEST (UTC+1)

8 July 2022 Friendly	Casa Pia (Portugal)	1–2	(England) Sheffield United	Lisbon
18:00 WEST (UTC+1)	Godwin 4'		Berge 32'; Jebbison 63'	Stadium: Estádio Pina Manique

20 July 2022 Friendly	Mafra (Portugal)	0–1	(Portugal) Casa Pia	TBD
10:30 WEST (UTC+1)

23 July 2022 Friendly	Casa Pia (Portugal)	0–0	(Portugal) Marítimo	Lousada
10:00 WEST (UTC+1)				Stadium: Complexo Desportivo de Lousada

27 July 2022 Friendly	Torreense (Portugal)	0–1	(Portugal) Casa Pia	TBD
10:00 WEST (UTC+1)			Godwin 79'

30 July 2022 Friendly	Estoril (Portugal)	3–2	(Portugal) Casa Pia	Estoril
10:30 WEST (UTC+1)	Léa Siliki 41'; Gouveia 44', 52'		Godwin 26', 70'	Stadium: Estádio António Coimbra da Mota

== Competitions ==
=== Overall record ===
Competition	First match	Last match	Starting round	Record							
Competition	First match	Last match	Starting round	Pld	W	D	L	GF	GA	GD	Win %
Primeira Liga	7 August 2022	May 2023	Matchday 1	13	7	2	4	13	10	+3	53.85
Taça de Portugal	16 October 2022		Third round	2	2	0	0	4	0	+4	100.00
Taça da Liga	20 November 2022		Group stage	2	0	1	1	1	2	−1	0.00
Total				17	9	3	5	18	12	+6	52.94

Last updated: 3 December 2022
Source: Soccerway

=== Primeira Liga ===
==== League table ====
Pos	Team	Pld	W	D	L	GF	GA	GD	Pts
8	Famalicão	34	13	5	16	39	47	−8	44
9	Boavista	34	12	8	14	43	54	−11	44
10	Casa Pia	34	11	8	15	31	40	−9	41
11	Vizela	34	11	7	16	34	38	−4	40 (Note: Vizela finished ahead of Rio Ave on head-to-head points: Rio Ave 0–1 Vizela, Vizela 3–1 Rio Ave.)
12	Rio Ave	34	10	10	14	36	43	−7	40

Source: Liga Portugal
Rules for classification: 1) Points; 2) Head-to-head points; 3) Head-to-head goal difference; 4) Goal difference; 5) Matches won; 6) Goals scored; 7) Play-off.

==== Results summary ====
Overall								Home						Away					
Pld	W	D	L	GF	GA	GD	Pts	W	D	L	GF	GA	GD	W	D	L	GF	GA	GD
34	11	8	15	31	40	−9	41	6	5	6	18	17	+1	5	3	9	13	23	−10

Last updated: 27 May 2023.
Source: Liga Portugal

==== Results by round ====
Round	1	2	3	4	5	6	7	8	9	10	11	12	13	14	15	16	17	18	19	20	21	22	23	24	25	26	27	28	29	30	31	32	33	34
Ground	A	H	H	A	H	A	H	A	H	A	H	A	H	A	H	A	H	H	A	A	H	A	H	A	H	A	H	A	H	A	H	A	H	A
Result	D	L	W	W	D	W	W	W	L	L	W	W	L	W	D	L	L	W	L	D	D	L	W	L	W	L	L	D	L	L	D	L	D	L
Position	11	14	11	7	7	6	6	4	4	5	4	4	5	5	5	5	5	5	5	6	6	7	6	7	6	7	8	9	9	10	10	10	10	10

Updated to match(es) played on 27 May 2023. Source: Liga Portugal
A = Away; H = Home; W = Win; D = Draw; L = Loss

==== Matches ====
The league fixtures were announced on 5 July 2022.

7 August 2022 1	Santa Clara	0–0	Casa Pia	Ponta Delgada
15:30 CEST (UTC+2)		Report		Stadium: Estádio de São Miguel; Referee: Bruno José Costa

13 August 2022 2	Casa Pia	0–1	Benfica	Leiria
18:00 CEST (UTC+2)	Neto (yellow card) 7'; Godwin (yellow card) 27'; Taira (yellow card) 31'; Kunimoto (yellow card) 51'; Fernandes (yellow card) 59'; Anderson (yellow card) 90+1'	Report	Otamendi (yellow card) 29' (yellow-red card) 90+2'; Florentino (yellow card) 30'; Ramos 58'; R. Silva (yellow card) 90+5'	Stadium: Estádio Dr. Magalhães Pessoa; Attendance: 22,253; Referee: Tiago Martins

21 August 2022 3	Casa Pia	2–0	Boavista	Leiria
15:30 CEST (UTC+2)	Rafael Martins 61'; Godwin 66'; Clayton (yellow card) 90'	Report	Filipe Ferreira (yellow card) 19'; Makouta (yellow card) 74'; Pérez (yellow card) 90+3'	Stadium: Estádio Dr. Magalhães Pessoa; Attendance: 1,136; Referee: (France) Pierre Gaillouste

29 August 2022 4	Vitória de Guimarães	0–1	Casa Pia	Guimarães
19:00 CEST (UTC+2)	Rúben Lameiras (yellow card) 41'; Bruno Varela (yellow card) 59'; André André (yellow card) 86'	Report	Kunimoto 7'; Zolotić (yellow card) 25'; Ricardo Batista (yellow card) 55'; Eteki (yellow card) 68'	Stadium: Estádio D. Afonso Henriques; Attendance: 14,231; Referee: (Portugal) Hélder Malheiro

4 September 2022 5	Casa Pia	0–0	Arouca	Oeiras, Portugal
15:30 CEST (UTC+2)	Romário Baró (yellow card) 64'; Vasco Fernandes (yellow card) 90+1'	Report		Stadium: Estádio Nacional; Attendance: 1,022; Referee: (Portugal) Carlos Macedo

11 September 2022 6	Paços de Ferreira	2–3	Casa Pia	Paços de Ferreira
15:30 CEST (UTC+2)	Adrián Butzke 17' 90+6'; Delgado (yellow card) 55'; Nuno Lima (yellow card) 66'	Report	Vasco Fernandes (yellow card) 44'; Léo Bolgado (yellow card) 52'; Godwin 58'; Neto 60' (yellow card) 65'; Clayton 74' (yellow card) 90'	Stadium: Estádio da Mata Real; Attendance: 4,112; Referee: (Portugal) Tiago Martins (referee)

18 September 2022 7	Casa Pia	1–0	Famalicão	Oeiras, Portugal
18:00 CEST (UTC+2)	Léo Bolgado 60'; Afonso Taira (yellow card) 76'	Report	Pelé (yellow card) 45+1'	Stadium: Estádio Nacional; Attendance: 917; Referee: (Portugal) Miguel Nogueira

3 October 2022 8	Marítimo	1–2	Casa Pia	Funchal
20:15 CEST (UTC+2)	Xadas 11'; Mosquera (yellow card) 13'; João Afonso (yellow card) 21'; Vítor Costa (red card) 67'; Edgar Costa (yellow card) 90+11'	Report	Clayton 18'; Zolotić (yellow card) 29' (yellow-red card) 45+3'; Leonardo Lelo 71' (pen.); João Nunes (yellow card) 83'; Rafael Martins (yellow card) 85'	Stadium: Estádio do Marítimo; Attendance: 4,484; Referee: (Portugal) Vitor Ferreira

9 October 2022 9	Casa Pia	0–1	Vizela	Oeiras, Portugal
18:00 CEST (UTC+2)	Afonso Taira (yellow card) 17'; Kunimoto (yellow card) 39'; João Nunes (yellow card) 79'	Report	Raphael Guzzo (yellow card) 23' (goal) 67'	Stadium: Estádio Nacional; Attendance: 2,912; Referee: (Portugal) João Pinheiro (referee)

22 October 2022 10	Sporting CP	3–1	Casa Pia	Lisbon
20:30 CEST (UTC+2)	Gonçalo Inácio (yellow card) 24'; Pedro Porro (yellow card) 45+3'; Paulinho 57'; Nuno Santos 59'; Pedro Gonçalves 65' (pen.)	Report	Godwin (yellow card) 23'; Clayton (yellow card) 37' (goal) 43'; Kunimoto (yellow card) 45'; Eteki (yellow card) 64'; Víto Ferreira (yellow card) 90+4'	Stadium: Estádio José Alvalade; Attendance: 26,679; Referee: (Portugal) Hélder Malheiro

30 October 2022 11	Casa Pia	1–0	Rio Ave	Oeiras, Portugal
18:00 CEST (UTC+2)	Afonso Taira (yellow card) 27'; Fernando Varela (yellow card) 57'; Godwin 66'	Report	Aderllan Santos (yellow card) 41'; Boateng (yellow card) 59'; João Graça (yellow card) 90+3'	Stadium: Estádio Nacional; Attendance: 1,859; Referee: (Portugal) Carlos Macedo

6 November 2022 12	Braga	0–1	Casa Pia	Braga
18:00 CEST (UTC+2)	Iuri Medeiros (yellow card) 45+8'; Vítor Tormena (yellow card) 83'	Report	Rafael Martins 23'; Eteki (yellow card) 59'; Léo Bolgado (yellow card) 72'; Cuca (yellow card) 90+3'	Stadium: Estádio Municipal de Braga; Attendance: 13,004; Referee: (Portugal) Luis Godinho

13 November 2022 13	Casa Pia	1–2	Chaves	Oeiras, Portugal
18:00 CEST (UTC+2)	João Nunes 28'; Godwin (yellow card) 37'; Leonardo Lelo (yellow card) 45+1'; Afonso Taira (yellow card) 87'; Léo Bolgado (yellow card) 90+4'	Report	João Teixeira (yellow card) 31'; Héctor Hernández 82'; Vitória 90+1' (pen.)	Stadium: Estádio Nacional; Attendance: 1,035; Referee: (Portugal) Hélder Carvalho

28 December 2022 14	Portimonense	1–2	Casa Pia	Portimão
19:00 CET (UTC+1)	Paulo Estrela (yellow card) 11'; Diaby (yellow card) 26'; Luquinha 35' (pen.); Klismahn (yellow card) 52'; Pedrão (yellow card) 83'	Report	Afonso Taira (yellow card) 17'; Neto 31'; Lucas Soares (yellow card) 33'; Clayton (yellow card) 79'; Antoine 90+4'	Stadium: Estádio Municipal de Portimão; Attendance: 1,002; Referee: (Portugal) Carlos Macedo

7 January 2023 15	Casa Pia	0–0	Porto	Oeiras, Portugal
20:30 CET (UTC+1)	Lucas Soares (yellow card) 33' (yellow-red card) 45+1'; Ricardo Batista (yellow card) 74'	Report		Stadium: Estádio Nacional; Attendance: 8,107; Referee: (Portugal) Nuno Miguel Serrano Almeida

16 January 2023 16	Estoril	2–0	Casa Pia	Estoril
19:00 CET (UTC+1)	Francisco Geraldes 32' (pen.); Mexer (yellow card) 46'; Tiago Gouveia 77'	Report	Fernando Varela (yellow card) 31'; Eteki (yellow card) 41'; Clayton (red card) 55'; Lucas Soares (yellow card) 64'; Cuca (yellow card) 72'; Rafael Martins (yellow card) 90+1'	Stadium: Estádio António Coimbra da Mota; Attendance: 1,290; Referee: (Portugal) Hélder Malheiro

22 January 2023 17	Casa Pia	1–3	Gil Vicente	Oeiras, Portugal
18:00 CET (UTC+1)	Romário Baró (yellow card) 44'; Rafael Martins 46' (yellow card) 81'	Report	Fran Navarro 50' 62'; Vitor Carvalho 54'; Kritsyuk (yellow card) 72'	Stadium: Estádio Nacional; Attendance: 772; Referee: (Portugal) Manuel Oliveira

29 January 2023 18	Casa Pia	2–1	Santa Clara	Oeiras, Portugal
15:30 CET (UTC+1)	Godwin (yellow card) 6'; Kunimoto (yellow card) 13'; Rafael Martins (yellow card) 35'; Lucas Soares (yellow card) 42'; Soma 75'; Romário Baró (yellow card) 78'; Clayton 90+4'	Report	Victor Bobsin (yellow card) 70'; Gabriel Silva 82' (pen.); Adriano (yellow card) 90+3'; Matheus Babi (yellow card) 90+5'; Paulo Henrique (yellow card) 90+8'	Stadium: Estádio Nacional; Attendance: 1,003; Referee: (Portugal) Gustavo Correia

4 February 2023 19	Benfica	3–0	Casa Pia	Lisbon
18:00 CET (UTC+1)	João Mário 35'; 43': Bah 71'	Report	Cuca (yellow card) 33'	Stadium: Estádio da Luz; Attendance: 58,763; Referee: (Portugal) André Narciso

13 February 2023 20	Boavista	0–0	Casa Pia	Porto
21:15 CET (UTC+1)	Pérez (yellow card) 30' (yellow-red card) 65'; Abascal (yellow card) 87'	Report	Diogo Pinto (yellow card) 29'; Afonso Taira (yellow card) 45+2'	Stadium: Estádio do Bessa; Attendance: 3,575; Referee: (Portugal) Manuel Mota

19 February 2023 21	Casa Pia	0–0	Vitória de Guimarães	Oeiras, Portugal
20:30 CET (UTC+1)	Vasco Fernandes (yellow card) 49'; Soma (yellow card) 61'; Beni Mukendi (yellow card) 84'	Report	Toukara (yellow card) 33'; Matheus Índio (yellow card) 78'	Stadium: Estádio Nacional; Attendance: 1,818; Referee: (Portugal) Cláudio Pereira

25 February 2023 22	Arouca	2–0	Casa Pia	Arouca
15:30 CET (UTC+1)	Quaresma (yellow card) 76'; Rafa Mújica 81' 90+3' (yellow card) 90+4'	Report	Ângelo Neto (yellow card) 36'; Beni Mukendi (yellow card) 71' (yellow-red card) 75'; Leonardo Lelo (yellow card) 90'	Stadium: Estádio Municipal de Arouca; Attendance: 1,071; Referee: (Portugal) Gustavo Correia

6 March 2023 23	Casa Pia	2–1	Paços de Ferreira	Oeiras, Portugal
20:15 CET (UTC+1)	Soma (yellow card) 34'; Zolotić (yellow card) 40'; Maracás 67' (o.g.); Fernando Varela 76'; Ricardo Batista (yellow card) 90+3'	Report	Paulo Bernardo 45+4' (yellow card) 55'; Holsgrove (yellow card) 68'	Stadium: Estádio Nacional; Attendance: 530; Referee: (Portugal) João Pinheiro

13 March 2023 24	Famalicão	1–0	Casa Pia	Vila Nova de Famalicão
20:15 CET (UTC+1)	Leandro Sanca (yellow card) 21'; Iván Jaime 36'; Alexandre Penetra (yellow card) 48'; Pablo (yellow card) 85'; Gustavo Assunção (yellow card) 90+6'	Report	Ângelo Neto (yellow card) 68'; Felippe Cardoso (yellow card) 70'; Soma (yellow card) 86'	Stadium: Estádio Municipal 22 de Junho; Attendance: 2,729; Referee: (Portugal) Bruno José Costa

19 March 2023 25	Casa Pia	2–0	Marítimo	Oeiras, Portugal
15:30 CET (UTC+1)	Felippe Cardoso 41' 50'; Ricardo Batista (yellow card) 90+1'; Clayton (yellow card) 90+2'	Report	Renê Santos (red card) 86'	Stadium: Estádio Nacional; Attendance: 2,432; Referee: (Portugal) António Nobre

1 April 2023 26	Vizela	3–1	Casa Pia	Vizela
15:30 CET (UTC+1)	Zolotić 37' (o.g.); Raphael Guzzo (yellow card) 60'; Osama Rashid (yellow card) 74'; João Nunes 81' (o.g.); Etim 87' (yellow card) 88'	Report	Rafael Martins 25'; Vasco Fernandes (yellow card) 35'; Godwin (yellow card) 61'	Stadium: Estádio do FC Vizela; Attendance: 3,008; Referee: (Portugal) Manuel Mota

9 April 2023 27	Casa Pia	3–4	Sporting CP	Oeiras, Portugal
18:00 CET (UTC+1)	Rafael Martins 7'; Soma 45+1'; Felippe Cardoso (yellow card) 59' (yellow-red card) 64' (goal) 62'; Cuca (yellow card) 74'	Report	Trincão 1' 39' 85'; Pote 48'	Stadium: Estádio Nacional; Attendance: 10,509; Referee: (Portugal) Fábio Veríssimo

16 April 2023 28	Rio Ave	1–1	Casa Pia	Vila do Conde
15:30 CET (UTC+1)	Patrick William (yellow card) 27'; Pantalon 52'	Report	Rafael Martins 17'; Ângelo Neto (yellow card) 29'; Fernando Varela (yellow card) 57'; Clayton (yellow card) 75'	Stadium: Estádio dos Arcos; Attendance: 2,752; Referee: (Portugal) Miguel Nogueira

21 April 2023 29	Casa Pia	0–1	Braga	Oeiras, Portugal
20:15 CET (UTC+1)	Ângelo Neto (yellow card) 19'; Rafael Martins (yellow card) 53'; Godwin (yellow card) 90+3'	Report	Ricardo Horta 54' (yellow card) 73'; Vítor Tormena (yellow card) 87'	Stadium: Estádio Nacional; Attendance: 1,016; Referee: (Portugal) Manuel Oliveira

29 April 2023 30	Chaves	1–0	Casa Pia	Chaves
18:00 CET (UTC+1)	Vitória (yellow card) 33' (goal) 42'; João Pedro (yellow card) 88'; Obiora (yellow card) 90+2'	Report	Beni Mukendi (yellow card) 21'; Godwin (yellow card) 50'; Soma (yellow card) 67'; Ângelo Neto (yellow card) 73'	Stadium: Estádio Municipal Eng. Manuel Branco Teixeira; Attendance: 2,451; Referee: (Portugal) Carlos Macedo

5 May 2023 31	Casa Pia	1–1	Portimonense	Oeiras, Portugal
20:15 CET (UTC+1)	Lucas Soares (yellow card) 43' (goal) 68'; Leonardo Lelo (yellow card) 90+7'	Report	Róchez 90+5'	Stadium: Estádio Nacional; Attendance: 556; Referee: (Portugal) Hélder Carvalho

14 May 2023 32	Porto	2–1	Casa Pia	Porto
20:30 CET (UTC+1)	Taremi 56'; Namaso 90+3' (yellow card) 90+9'	Report	Evanilson 45+5' (o.g.); Zolotić (yellow card) 49'; Felippe Cardoso (yellow card) 74'; Afonso Taira (yellow card) 90+7'	Stadium: Estádio do Dragão; Attendance: 35,203; Referee: (Portugal) Manuel Oliveira

21 May 2023 33	Casa Pia	2–2	Estoril	Leiria
18:00 CET (UTC+1)	Felippe Cardoso 85' (pen.); Godwin 90+6' (pen.) (yellow card) 90+7'	Report	Guitane (yellow card) 34'; João Carvalho (yellow card) 58'; Cassiano 74' (yellow card) 77'; Bernardo Vital (yellow card) 83'; Francisco Geraldes (yellow card) 86'; Joãozinho (yellow card) 90+1'; Pedro Álvaro 90+8'	Stadium: Estádio Dr. Magalhães Pessoa; Attendance: 302; Referee: (Portugal) Carlos Macedo

=== Taça de Portugal ===
16 October 2022 Third Round	AR São Martinho	0–2	Casa Pia	São Martinho do Campo - Santo Tirso
15:00	Nuno Moreira (yellow card) 61' (yellow-red card) 72'	Report	Neto (yellow card) 38'; Rafael Martins 51'; Anderson (yellow card) 85' (yellow-red card) 90+5'; Derick Poloni 90+3'	Stadium: Estádio Comendador Abílio Ferreira de Oliveira; Referee: (Portugal) Manuel Mota

9 November 2022 Round Of 32	Casa Pia	2–0	Valadares Gaia	Oeiras, Portugal
17:45	Rafael Martins 26'; Anderson 31'; Víto Ferreira (yellow card) 77'; Leonardo Lelo (yellow card) 84'	Report		Stadium: Estádio Nacional; Referee: (Portugal) André Narciso

12 January 2023 Round Of 16	Vitória de Setúbal	0–1	Casa Pia	Setúbal
19:45	José Semedo (yellow card) 35'; Pedro Pinto (yellow card) 55'; Malam Camará (yellow card) 55'; Rodrigo Pereira (yellow card) 61'	Report	Eteki 3'; Léo Bolgado (yellow card) 37'; Vasco Fernandes (yellow card) 58'; João Nunes (yellow card) 67'; Ricardo Batista (red card) 90+7'	Stadium: Estádio do Bonfim; Referee: (Portugal) António Nobre

9 February 2023 Quarter Finals	Casa Pia	2–5 (a.e.t.)	Nacional	Setúbal
17:30	João Nunes (yellow card) 6' (yellow-red card) 17'; Diogo Pinto 53'; Clayton (yellow card) 67'; Rafael Martins 80'; (yellow card) 118': Vasco Fernandes (yellow card) 90+5' (yellow-red card) 92'; Fernando Varela (yellow card) 115'	Report	Luís Esteves 44' 46'; Witi (yellow card) 76'; Rúben Ramos (yellow card) 77'; Rafael Vieira (yellow card) 86'; Danilović (yellow card) 90+8' (goal) 94' (pen.); Clayton (yellow card) 100'; Bruno Gomes 105+3' (pen.); Gustavo Silva 108'	Stadium: Estádio do Bonfim; Referee: (Portugal) Miguel Nogueira

=== Group D ===
Pos	Team	Pld	W	D	L	GF	GA	GD	Pts	
1	Braga	3	3	0	0	6	0	+6	9	Advance to the quarter-finals
2	Casa Pia	3	1	1	1	2	2	0	4	
3	Paços de Ferreira	3	0	2	1	2	4	−2	2	
4	Trofense	3	0	1	2	1	5	−4	1	

Source: Soccerway

20 November 2022 Match 1	Paços de Ferreira	1–1	Casa Pia	Paços de Ferreira
20:15	Luíz Carlos (yellow card) 33'; Antunes 40'; Koffi (yellow card) 89'	Report	Fernando Varela 47'	Stadium: Estádio da Mata Real; Referee: (Portugal) Cláudio Pereira

3 December 2022 Match 2	Casa Pia	0–1	Braga	Oeiras, Portugal
17:00	Lucas Soares (yellow card) 4'; Clayton (yellow card) 58'	Report	Vitinha 22'; Banza (yellow card) 47' (yellow-red card) 50'; Abel Ruiz (yellow card) 90'; Matheus (yellow card) 90+8'	Stadium: Estádio Nacional; Referee: (Portugal) Fábio Veríssimo

11 December 2022 Match 3	Casa Pia	1–0	Trofense	Oeiras, Portugal
19:00	Antoine 17'; Romário Baró (yellow card) 22'; Godwin (red card) 71'; Vasco Fernandes (yellow card) 84'; Clayton (yellow card) 84'	Report	Marcos Valente (yellow card) 18'; Rúben Pereira (yellow card) 35'	Stadium: Estádio Nacional; Referee: (Portugal) Luis Godinho
