= Duplexe Tchamba =

Cameroonian footballer

Personal information
- Full name: Duplexe Tchamba Bangou
- Date of birth: 10 July 1998 (age 28)
- Place of birth: Yaoundé, Cameroon
- Height: 1.91 m (6 ft 3 in)
- Position: Centre-back

Team information
- Current team: Remo
- Number: 18

Youth career
- 2014–2017: TAD Sport Academy
- 2017–2019: Strasbourg

Senior career*
| Years | Team | Apps | (Gls) |
| 2017–2021 | Strasbourg B | 24 | (0) |
| 2019–2021 | Strasbourg | 0 | (0) |
| 2019–2021 | → Strømsgodset (loan) | 30 | (4) |
| 2021–2023 | SønderjyskE | 26 | (2) |
| 2022–2023 | → Casa Pia (loan) | 5 | (0) |
| 2023–2026 | Casa Pia | 42 | (4) |
| 2026– | Remo | 23 | (1) |

International career^{‡}
| 2017 | Cameroon U20 | 3 | (0) |
| 2017 | Cameroon U23 | 2 | (0) |
| 2021– | Cameroon | 5 | (0) |
- * Club domestic league appearances and goals as of 19 September 2026 ‡ National team caps and goals as of 22:03, 29 September 2026 (UTC)

Duplexe Tchamba Bangou (born 10 July 1998) is a Cameroonian professional footballer who plays as a centre-back for Brasileirão Série A side Clube do Remo and the Cameroon national team.

== Club career ==
Tchamba was a product of the TAD Sport Academy in Cameroon, and moved to Strasbourg on 22 March 2017. He made his professional debut for Strasbourg in a 1–0 Coupe de France win over Grenoble on 16 January 2019.

After a two-year loan spell at Norwegian club Strømsgodset, Tchamba signed a four-year deal with Danish Superliga club SønderjyskE on 2 July 2021. After a season, which for SønderjyskE ended with relegation to the Danish 1st Division, the club confirmed on 1 September 2022, that Tchamba had joined Portuguese club Casa Pia on a season-long loan deal.

On 10 July 2023, SønderjyskE sold Tchamba to Casa Pia.

On 4 March 2026, Brazilian club Remo officially announced the signing of Tchamba from Casa Pia. Following his arrival, he quickly established himself in Remo's starting lineup, becoming one of the club's key players in the 2026 Brasileirão Série A season. His consistent performances for the Amazonian side drew praise from the local media, which highlighted him as one of the league's best defenders during the 2026 campaign, ultimately earning him a recall to the Cameroon national team in September 2026 after a five-year absence.

== International career ==
Tchamba represented Cameroon U20s at the 2017 Africa U-20 Cup of Nations, and the Cameroon U23s in a set of friendlies. He debuted with the senior Cameroon national team in a 1–0 friendly win over Nigeria on 4 June 2021. On 7 September 2026, Tchamba was recalled to the senior Cameroon national team following standout performances for Clube do Remo in the 2026 Brasileirão Série A season. He featured in the starting eleven for the Africa Cup of Nations qualification matches against the Comoros and Congo on 24 and 29 September, respectively. In doing so, he became the club's first player ever to play for a senior national team, and the first to play for any national team since Rosemiro featured for the Brazilian Olympic team that won the gold medal at the 1975 Pan American Games.

== Career statistics ==
=== Club ===
As of match played 19 September 2026

Appearances and goals by club, season and competition
| Club | Season | Division | League | | State League | | National cup | | League Cup | | Total | |
| Club | Season | Division | Apps | Goals | Apps | Goals | Apps | Goals | Apps | Goals | Apps | Goals |
|---|---|---|---|---|---|---|---|---|---|---|---|---|
| Strasbourg B | 2017–18 | CFA 2 | 10 | 1 | — | | — | | — | | 10 | 1 |
| Strasbourg B | 2018–19 | CFA 2 | 14 | 0 | — | | — | | — | | 14 | 0 |
| Strasbourg B | Total | | 24 | 1 | — | | — | | — | | 24 | 1 |
| Strasbourg | 2018–19 | Ligue 1 | 0 | 0 | — | | 1 | 0 | 0 | 0 | 1 | 0 |
| Strømsgodset (loan) | 2019 | Eliteserien | 15 | 2 | — | | — | | — | | 15 | 2 |
| Strømsgodset (loan) | 2020 | Eliteserien | 12 | 1 | — | | — | | — | | 12 | 1 |
| Strømsgodset (loan) | 2021 | Eliteserien | 3 | 1 | — | | — | | — | | 3 | 1 |
| Strømsgodset (loan) | Total | | 30 | 4 | — | | — | | — | | 30 | 4 |
| SønderjyskE | 2021–22 | Danish Superliga | 26 | 2 | — | | 4 | 1 | — | | 30 | 3 |
| Casa Pia (loan) | 2022–23 | Primeira Liga | 5 | 0 | — | | — | | — | | 5 | 0 |
| Casa Pia | 2023–24 | Primeira Liga | 16 | 1 | — | | 1 | 0 | 3 | 0 | 20 | 1 |
| Casa Pia | 2024–25 | Primeira Liga | 21 | 2 | — | | 2 | 0 | 0 | 0 | 23 | 2 |
| Casa Pia | 2025–26 | Primeira Liga | 5 | 1 | — | | 1 | 0 | 0 | 0 | 6 | 1 |
| Casa Pia | Total | | 42 | 4 | — | | 4 | 0 | 3 | 0 | 49 | 4 |
| Remo | 2026 | Série A | 20 | 0 | 1 | 0 | 2 | 1 | — | | 23 | 1 |
| Career total | | | 137 | 10 | 1 | 0 | 11 | 2 | 3 | 0 | 162 | 12 |

=== International ===
As of match played 29 September 2026

Appearances and goals by national team and year
| National team | Year | Apps | Goals |
|---|---|---|---|
| Cameroon | 2021 | 3 | 0 |
| Cameroon | 2026 | 2 | 0 |
| Total | | 5 | 0 |
