= Dong-jun =

- Hangul: 동준
- RR: Dongjun
- MR: Tongjun

Dong-jun, also spelled Dong-joon, is a Korean given name.

People with this name include:

- Lee Dong-june (born 1967), South Korean composer
- Lee Juck (born Lee Dong-jun, 1974), South Korean singer
- Lee Dong-jun (basketball) (born 1980), American-born South Korean basketball player
- Kim Dong-jun (born 1992), South Korean singer, member of boy band ZE:A
- Kim Dong-jun (footballer) (born 1994), South Korean football player
- Lee Dong-jun (footballer) (born 1997), South Korean football player

Fictional characters with this name include:

- Kang Dong-joon, in 1995 South Korean television series Asphalt Man

== See also ==
- List of Korean given names
