= 2022 EAFF E-1 Football Championship =

EAFF E-1 サッカー選手権 2022

Tournament details
- Host country: Japan
- Dates: 19–27 July
- Teams: 4 (from 1 sub-confederation)
- Venue: 2 (in 2 host cities)

Final positions
- Champions: Japan (2nd title)
- Runners-up: South Korea
- Third place: China
- Fourth place: Hong Kong

Tournament statistics
- Matches played: 6
- Goals scored: 16 (2.67 per match)
- Attendance: 38,378 (6,396 per match)
- Top scorer(s): (Japan) Shuto Machino (Japan) Yuki Soma (3 goals each)
- Best player: (Japan) Yuki Soma
- Best goalkeeper: (South Korea) Kim Dong-jun

The 2022 EAFF E-1 Football Championship was an association football tournament organized by the East Asian Football Federation. It was the 9th edition of the EAFF E-1 Football Championship, the football championship of East Asia. The finals were originally scheduled to be held in China. However, on 19 April 2022, it was announced that Japan would host the finals. It was the nation's fourth time hosting the tournament.

In this edition, preliminary rounds were not conducted. North Korea withdrew from the competition and the remaining slot of the participating teams for the final round was decided upon the FIFA rankings as of 31 March 2022.

== Teams ==
- Japan (host)
- China
- South Korea
- Hong Kong

== Table ==
Pos	Team	Pld	W	D	L	GF	GA	GD	Pts	Qualification or relegation
1	Japan (H, C)	3	2	1	0	9	0	+9	7	Winners
2	South Korea	3	2	0	1	6	3	+3	6	Runners-up
3	China	3	1	1	1	1	3	−2	4	Third place
4	Hong Kong	3	0	0	3	0	10	−10	0	Fourth place

Source: EAFF
(C) Champions; (H) Hosts

== Matches ==
19 July 2022
19:20

Japan	6–0	Hong Kong
Soma 2', 55'; Machino 20', 57'; Nishimura 22', 40'	Report (EAFF)

Kashima Stadium, Kashima
Attendance: 4,980
Referee: Hassan Akrami (Iran)
20 July 2022
19:00

China	0–3	South Korea
	Report (EAFF)	Zhu Chenjie 40' (o.g.); Kwon Chang-hoon 54'; Cho Gue-sung 80'

Toyota Stadium, Toyota
Attendance: 200
Referee: Akhrol Riskullaev (Uzbekistan)

24 July 2022
16:00

South Korea	3–0	Hong Kong
Kang Seong-jin 17', 86'; Hong Chul 74'	Report (EAFF)

Toyota Stadium, Toyota
Attendance: 4,335
Referee: Nazmi Nasaruddin (Malaysia)
24 July 2022
19:20

Japan	0–0	China
	Report (EAFF)

Toyota Stadium, Toyota
Attendance: 10,526
Referee: Nivon Robesh Gamini (Sri Lanka)

27 July 2022
16:00

China	1–0	Hong Kong
Tan Long 67'	Report (EAFF)

Toyota Stadium, Toyota
Attendance: 4,220
Referee: Mongkolchai Pechsri (Thailand)
27 July 2022
19:20

Japan	3–0	South Korea
Soma 49'; Sasaki 64'; Machino 72'	Report (EAFF)

Toyota Stadium, Toyota
Attendance: 14,117
Referee: Akhrol Riskullaev (Uzbekistan)

== Awards ==
Best goalkeeper	Best defender	Top scorer	Most valuable player
(South Korea) Kim Dong-jun	(Japan) Shogo Taniguchi	(Japan) Shuto Machino (Japan) Yuki Soma	(Japan) Yuki Soma

== Goalscorers ==
There were 16 goals scored in 6 matches, for an average of 2.67 goals per match.

3 goals

- (Japan) Shuto Machino
- (Japan) Yuki Soma

2 goals

- (Japan) Takuma Nishimura
- (South Korea) Kang Seong-jin

1 goal

- (China) Tan Long
- (Japan) Sho Sasaki
- (South Korea) Cho Gue-sung
- (South Korea) Hong Chul
- (South Korea) Kwon Chang-hoon

1 own goal

- (China) Zhu Chenjie (against South Korea)

== Broadcasting rights ==
- Japan – Fuji TV
- South Korea – SPOTV

== See also ==
- 2022 EAFF E-1 Football Championship (women)
- 2023 SAFF Championship
- 2023 WAFF Championship
- 2023 AFC Asian Cup
