= Henrique Pereira (footballer) =

Portuguese footballer

Personal information
- Full name: Henrique Martins Pereira
- Date of birth: 15 February 2002 (age 24)
- Place of birth: Lisbon, Portugal
- Height: 1.78 m (5 ft 10 in)
- Position: Winger

Team information
- Current team: Feirense (on loan from Santa Clara)
- Number: 25

Youth career
- 2010–2021: Benfica

Senior career*
Years	Team	Apps	(Gls)
2021–2025	Benfica B	81	(18)
2024–2025	→ Casa Pia (loan)	24	(1)
2025–	Santa Clara	0	(0)
2025–2026	→ Chaves (loan)	12	(0)
2026–	→ Feirense (loan)	7	(1)

International career
2017	Portugal U15	5	(0)
2017–2018	Portugal U16	6	(4)
2018–2019	Portugal U17	14	(1)
2019	Portugal U18	10	(4)
2021–2022	Portugal U20	9	(0)
- * Club domestic league appearances and goals as of 19:07, 22 November 2026 (UTC)

Henrique Martins Pereira (born 15 February 2002) is a Portuguese professional footballer who plays as a winger for Liga Portugal 2 club Feirense on loan from Santa Clara.

== Club career ==
Pereira was born in Lisbon, and he joined S.L. Benfica's academy aged 8. He made his professional debut with the reserve team on 25 January 2021, as a 60th-minute substitute in a 1–1 draw against FC Porto B in the Liga Portugal 2.

Pereira scored his first league goal on 13 February 2022, in a 2–1 away win over S.C. Covilhã. He netted a career-best nine times in the 2022–23 season, but his team could only finish 14th.

In July 2024, Pereira was loaned to Primeira Liga club Casa Pia AC. He made his debut in the competition on 24 August, featuring 24 minutes of the 0–2 home loss to C.D. Santa Clara. He scored his first goal the following weekend, the only in a victory at C.F. Estrela da Amadora.

On 2 July 2025, Pereira left Benfica and signed a three-year contract with Santa Clara. He returned to the second tier in September, however, on loan to G.D. Chaves.

For the 2026–27 campaign, also on loan, Pereira joined C.D. Feirense.

== International career ==
Pereira won caps for Portugal at youth level. He appeared in two editions of the UEFA European Under-17 Championship.

== Career statistics ==
As of match played 7 August 2025

Appearances and goals by club, season and competition
Club	Season	League			Cup		League cup		Europe		Other		Total	
Club	Season	Division	Apps	Goals	Apps	Goals	Apps	Goals	Apps	Goals	Apps	Goals	Apps	Goals
Benfica B	2020–21	Liga Portugal 2	1	0	—		—		—		—		1	0
Benfica B	2021–22	Liga Portugal 2	22	3	—		—		—		—		22	3
Benfica B	2022–23	Liga Portugal 2	34	9	—		—		—		—		34	9
Benfica B	2023–24	Liga Portugal 2	24	6	—		—		—		—		24	6
Benfica B	Total		81	18	—		—		—		—		81	18
Casa Pia	2024–25	Primeira Liga	24	1	2	1	—		—		—		26	2
Santa Clara	2025–26	Primeira Liga	0	0	0	0	0	0	2 (Note: Appearances in UEFA Conference League)	0	—		2	0
Career total			105	19	2	1	0	0	2	0	0	0	109	20

== Honours ==
Benfica

- Under-20 Intercontinental Cup: 2022
