= EAFF E-1 Football Championship =

East Asian association football tournament for men's national teams

- Organiser(s): EAFF
- Founded: 2003; 23 years ago
- Region: East Asia
- Teams: Preliminary: 5 Finals: 4
- Qualifier for: AFF–EAFF Champions Trophy
- Current champions: Japan (3rd title)
- Most championships: South Korea (5 titles)
- Website: eaff.com
- 2025 EAFF E-1 Football Championship

EAFF E-1 Football Championship, known as the East Asian Football Championship from 2003 to 2010, and the EAFF East Asian Cup for the 2013 and 2015 editions, is a men's international football competition in East Asia for member nations of the East Asian Football Federation (EAFF). Before the EAFF was founded in 2002, the Dynasty Cup was held between the East Asian top four teams, and was regarded as the East Asian Championship. There is a separate competition for men (first held in 2003) and women (first held in 2005).

The most recent edition was held in 2025 in Korea.

== History ==
The Dynasty Cup is a defunct international association football competition that is regarded as the predecessor to East Asian Football Championship. It was held four times from 1990 to 1998. The purpose of the competition was to improve the quality of football in the East Asia and the national teams in the area participated in the tournament. After the East Asian Football Federation was formed in 2002, the East Asian Football Championship replaced this tournament.

In the tournament, China, South Korea, and Japan have the right to automatically enter the competition, while other participants have to go through a qualifying round. Other participants that take part are Chinese Taipei, North Korea, Northern Mariana Islands, Guam, Hong Kong, Mongolia, and Macau. Australia, being a non-member of the EAFF, was invited to take part in the 2013 tournament.

In 2005 there was also a combined points competition in 2005, where the results of the men's and women's teams were added together (not including qualifiers). In April 2012, the competition was renamed to the "EAFF East Asian Cup". In December 2015, the new competition name "EAFF East Asian Championship" was approved, but later changed to "EAFF E-1 Football Championship".

== Results ==
Editions	Years	Hosts	Champions	Runners-up	Third place	Fourth place
East Asian Football Championship
1	2003	Japan	South Korea	Japan	China	Hong Kong
2	2005	South Korea	China	Japan	North Korea	South Korea
3	2008	China	South Korea	Japan	China	North Korea
4	2010	Japan	China	South Korea	Japan	Hong Kong
EAFF East Asian Cup
5	2013	South Korea	Japan	China	South Korea	Australia
6	2015	China	South Korea	China	North Korea	Japan
EAFF E-1 Football Championship
7	2017	Japan	South Korea	Japan	China	North Korea
8	2019	South Korea	South Korea	Japan	China	Hong Kong
9	2022	Japan	Japan	South Korea	China	Hong Kong
10	2025	South Korea	Japan	South Korea	China	Hong Kong
11	2028	China	TBD			
12	2030	Japan	TBD			

== Teams reaching the top four ==
Team	Titles	Runners-up	Third place	Fourth place	Total
South Korea	5 (2003, 2008, 2015, 2017, 2019)	3 (2010, 2022, 2025)	1 (2013)	1 (2005)	10
Japan	3 (2013, 2022, 2025)	5 (2003, 2005, 2008, 2017, 2019)	1 (2010)	1 (2015)	10
China	2 (2005, 2010)	2 (2013, 2015)	6 (2003, 2008, 2017, 2019, 2022, 2025)	–	10
North Korea	–	–	2 (2005, 2015)	2 (2008, 2017)	4
Hong Kong	–	–	–	5 (2003, 2010, 2019, 2022, 2025)	5
Australia	–	–	–	1 (2013)	1

== Overall team records ==
In this ranking 3 points are awarded for a win, 1 for a draw and 0 for a loss. As per statistical convention in football, matches decided in extra time are counted as wins and losses, while matches decided by penalty shoot-outs are counted as draws. Teams are ranked by total points, then by goal difference, then by goals scored.

As of 2025 EAFF E-1 Football Championship

=== Final ===
Rank	Team	Part	Pld	W	D	L	GF	GA	GD	Pts
1	Japan	10	30	16	9	5	53	26	+27	57
2	South Korea	10	30	15	10	5	44	21	+23	55
3	China	10	30	10	9	11	37	37	0	39
4	North Korea	4	12	2	5	5	7	13	–6	11
5	Australia	1	3	0	1	2	5	7	–2	1
6	Hong Kong	5	15	0	0	15	3	45	–42	0

=== Preliminary ===
Rank	Team	Part	Pld	W	D	L	GF	GA	GD	Pts
1	Hong Kong	9	30	20	4	6	114	21	+93	64
2	North Korea	7	23	19	4	0	91	9	+82	61
3	Chinese Taipei	9	32	13	4	15	73	57	+16	43
4	Guam	8	39	11	5	23	52	171	–119	38
5	Mongolia	8	28	9	4	15	50	70	–20	31
6	Macau	8	22	7	5	10	38	45	–7	26
7	Australia	1	4	3	1	0	19	1	+18	10
8	Northern Mariana Islands	6	16	1	1	14	12	75	–63	4

== Comprehensive team results by tournaments ==
Numbers refer to the final placing of each team at the respective games.

Nations	2003	2005	2008	2010	2013	2015	2017	2019	2022	2025	Years
China	3	1	3	1	2	2	3	3	3	3	10
Japan	2	2	2	3	1	4	2	2	1	1	10
South Korea	1	4	1	2	3	1	1	1	2	2	10
North Korea		3	4			3	4				4
Hong Kong	4			4				4	4	4	5
Australia					4						1
Total nations	4	4	4	4	4	4	4	4	4	4	

== Awards ==
Year	Most Valuable Player	Top goalscorer(s)	Goals	Best Goalkeeper	Best Defender
2003	(South Korea) Yoo Sang-chul	(Japan) Tatsuhiko Kubo	2	Not awarded	Not awarded
2005	(China) Ji Mingyi	Not awarded		(South Korea) Lee Woon-jae	(China) Zhang Yaokun
2008	(South Korea) Kim Nam-il	(South Korea) Yeom Ki-hun (South Korea) Park Chu-young (Japan) Koji Yamase (North Korea) Jong Tae-se	2	(North Korea) Ri Myong-guk	(Japan) Yuji Nakazawa
2010	(China) Du Wei	(China) Qu Bo (South Korea) Lee Dong-gook (South Korea) Lee Seung-yeoul (Japan) Keiji Tamada	2	(China) Yang Zhi	(South Korea) Cho Yong-hyung
2013	(Japan) Hotaru Yamaguchi	(Japan) Yoichiro Kakitani	3	Not awarded	Not awarded
2015	(South Korea) Jang Hyun-soo	(Japan) Yuki Muto	2	(North Korea) Ri Myong-guk	(South Korea) Kim Young-gwon
2017	(South Korea) Lee Jae-sung	(South Korea) Kim Shin-wook	3	(South Korea) Jo Hyeon-woo	(South Korea) Jang Hyun-soo
2019	(South Korea) Hwang In-beom	(Japan) Kōki Ogawa	3	(South Korea) Kim Seung-gyu	(South Korea) Kim Min-jae
2022	(Japan) Yūki Sōma	(Japan) Shūto Machino (Japan) Yūki Sōma	3	(South Korea) Kim Dong-jun	(Japan) Shōgo Taniguchi
2025	(Japan) Ryo Germain	(Japan) Ryo Germain	5	(Japan) Keisuke Ōsako	(South Korea) Kim Moon-hwan

Year	Winning coach	Fair Play Award	Best Referee
2003	(Portugal) Humberto Coelho	Not awarded	Not awarded
2005	(China) Zhu Guanghu	Japan	Not awarded
2008	(South Korea) Huh Jung-moo	South Korea	Not awarded
2010	(China) Gao Hongbo	Hong Kong	Not awarded
2013	(Italy) Alberto Zaccheroni	Not awarded	Not awarded
2015	(Germany) Uli Stielike	Not awarded	Not awarded
2017	(South Korea) Shin Tae-yong	Not awarded	Not awarded
2019	(Portugal) Paulo Bento	Not awarded	Not awarded
2022	(Japan) Hajime Moriyasu	Not awarded	(Uzbekistan) Akhrol Riskullaev
2025	(Japan) Hajime Moriyasu	Not awarded	Not awarded

== See also ==
- EAFF E-1 Football Championship (women)
- ASEAN Championship
- CAFA Championship
- SAFF Championship
- WAFF Championship
- AFC Asian Cup
- East Asian Football Federation
