= Max Svensson =

Max Svensson may refer to:

- Max Svensson (footballer, born 1998), Swedish football winger for Willem II
- Max Svensson (footballer, born 2001), Spanish football striker for Espanyol
