= João Goulart (footballer) =

Portuguese footballer (born 2000)

Personal information
- Full name: João Pedro Goulart Silva
- Date of birth: 27 January 2000 (age 26)
- Place of birth: Faial, Portugal
- Height: 1.91 m (6 ft 3 in)
- Position: Centre-back

Team information
- Current team: Casa Pia
- Number: 4

Youth career
- 2008–2012: Salão
- 2012–2014: Fayal
- 2014–2015: Outurela
- 2015–2020: Sporting CP

Senior career*
Years	Team	Apps	(Gls)
2020–2022	Sporting CP B	24	(2)
2021	Sporting CP	0	(0)
2022–2024	Mafra	55	(0)
2024–	Casa Pia	58	(2)
- * Club domestic league appearances and goals as of 18:57, 20 May 2026 (UTC)

João Pedro Goulart Silva (born 27 January 2000) is a Portuguese professional footballer who plays as a central defender for Primeira Liga club Casa Pia.

== Club career ==
=== Sporting CP ===
Born in the Faial Island in the Azores, Goulart joined Sporting CP's youth system in 2015. He began his senior career with their reserves in the third division.

Goulart made his official debut with the first team on 15 October 2021, as a 83rd–minute substitute for Gonçalo Inácio in a 4–0 away win against C.F. Os Belenenses in the third round of the Taça de Portugal.

=== Mafra ===
On 28 January 2022, Goulart signed a two-and-a-half-year contract with Liga Portugal 2 club C.D. Mafra. He played his first game in the professional leagues on 20 February, as a late replacement in the 3–1 victory at C.D. Trofense.

=== Casa Pia ===
On 5 July 2024, Goulart joined Casa Pia A.C. on a three-year deal. His first Primeira Liga appearance took place on 10 August, in a 0–1 home loss to Boavista F.C. where he featured 93 minutes.

Goulart scored his first goal in the competition on 8 December 2024, through a bicycle kick to open an eventual 1–1 draw at home to AVS Futebol SAD. His second came the following 5 January, in a 1–1 draw against F.C. Famalicão also at the borrowed ground of the Estádio Municipal de Rio Maior.

== International career ==
Goulart was called up to the Portugal under-18 team in February 2018.
