= Leonardo Lelo =

Portuguese footballer

Personal information
- Full name: Leonardo Filipe da Cruz Lelo
- Date of birth: 30 March 2000 (age 26)
- Place of birth: Olhão, Portugal
- Height: 1.75 m (5 ft 9 in)
- Position: Left-back

Team information
- Current team: Almería (on loan from Braga)
- Number: 15

Youth career
- 2011–2016: Olhanense
- 2016–2017: Vitória Setúbal
- 2017: Louletano
- 2017–2018: Olhanense

Senior career*
Years	Team	Apps	(Gls)
2018–2021	Olhanense	56	(0)
2020–2021	→ Portimonense (loan)	0	(0)
2021–2025	Casa Pia	126	(8)
2025–	Braga	29	(0)
2026–	→ Almería (loan)	8	(0)

International career
2019	Portugal U20	2	(0)
2022–2023	Portugal U21	5	(0)
- * Club domestic league appearances and goals as of 21:55, 15 November 2026 (UTC)

Leonardo Filipe da Cruz Lelo (born 30 March 2000) is a Portuguese professional footballer who plays as a left-back for Segunda División club Almería, on loan from Primeira Liga club Braga.

== Club career ==
=== Olhanense ===
Lelo was born in Olhão, Algarve, and finished his development in the academy of Olhanense. After starting his senior career with the club in the third division, he was loaned to Portimonense of Primeira Liga for the 2020–21 season, but only managed to appear for their under-23 side.

=== Casa Pia ===
On 16 June 2021, Lelo signed a contract with Casa Pia of unspecified duration. He made his professional debut on 24 July, scoring in a 4–1 away win against Académico de Viseu in the first round of the Taça da Liga. His first appearance in the Liga Portugal 2 took place on 7 August against the same opponents, now in a 2–1 loss. He netted five times from 34 games in his debut campaign, helping to a return to the top division for the first time in 83 years; for his displays, he was included in the Team of the Year.

Lelo made his top-flight debut on 7 August 2022, missing a penalty in the tenth minute of a 0–0 draw away to Santa Clara. He scored his first goal also from the eleven-meter spot, helping to a 2–1 victory at Marítimo on 3 October.

=== Braga ===
On 22 May 2025, Lelo joined Braga on a four-year deal with a €30 million buyout clause. He made 47 appearances in his first season while leading the team in assists, but was subsequently completely ostracised by manager Carlos Vicens.

On 1 September 2026, Lelo moved to Segunda División side Almería on a one-year loan.

== International career ==
Lelo represented Portugal at under-20 and under-21 levels. He earned his first cap for the latter on 24 September 2022, being booked as a second-half substitute in a 4–1 home friendly win over Georgia in Covilhã.

== Career statistics ==
As of match played 16 May 2026

Appearances and goals by club, season and competition
Club	Season	League			Taça de Portugal		Taça da Liga		Europe		Total	
Club	Season	Division	Apps	Goals	Apps	Goals	Apps	Goals	Apps	Goals	Apps	Goals
Olhanense	2018–19	Campeonato de Portugal	32	0	1	0	—		—		33	0
Olhanense	2019–20	Campeonato de Portugal	24	0	2	0	—		—		26	0
Olhanense	Total		56	0	3	0	—		—		59	0
Portimonense (loan)	2020–21	Primeira Liga	0	0	0	0	0	0	—		0	0
Casa Pia	2021–22	Liga Portugal 2	34	5	4	1	2	1	—		40	7
Casa Pia	2022–23	Primeira Liga	27	1	2	0	2	0	—		31	1
Casa Pia	2023–24	Primeira Liga	33	1	1	0	4	0	—		38	1
Casa Pia	2024–25	Primeira Liga	32	1	1	0	0	0	—		33	1
Casa Pia	Total		126	8	8	1	8	1	—		142	10
Braga	2025–26	Primeira Liga	29	0	4	0	2	1	12 (Note: Appearances in UEFA Europa League)	0	47	1
Career Total			211	8	15	1	10	2	12	0	248	11

== Honours ==
Individual

- Liga Portugal 2 Team of the Season: 2021–22
