= Tiago Dias =

Portuguese footballer (born 1998)

Personal information
- Full name: Tiago Daniel Rodrigues Dias
- Date of birth: 4 May 1998 (age 28)
- Place of birth: Lisbon, Portugal
- Height: 1.75 m (5 ft 9 in)
- Positions: Left-back; winger

Team information
- Current team: Tondela
- Number: 77

Youth career
- 2011–2013: Sporting CP
- 2013–2017: Benfica
- 2017–2018: AC Milan

Senior career*
Years	Team	Apps	(Gls)
2017	Benfica B	4	(1)
2018–2019	AC Milan	0	(0)
2018–2019	→ Braga B (loan)	12	(3)
2019–2020	Famalicão B	23	(4)
2020–2021	Olhanense	26	(3)
2021–2023	Feirense	59	(3)
2023–2025	Casa Pia	27	(1)
2025–2026	Lusitânia	29	(5)
2026–	Tondela	3	(0)

International career^{‡}
2014	Portugal U16	6	(3)
2014	Portugal U17	3	(0)
2015–2016	Portugal U18	5	(2)
2016–2017	Portugal U19	7	(1)
2017–2018	Portugal U20	5	(1)
- * Club domestic league appearances and goals as of 12 September 2026 ‡ National team caps and goals as of 11 August 2023

Tiago Daniel Rodrigues Dias (born 4 May 1998) is a Portuguese professional footballer who plays as a left-back or winger for Liga Portugal 2 club Tondela.

== Club career ==
=== AC Milan ===
Dias transferred to AC Milan's youth academy in August 2017 from Benfica. In his debut season for Primavera (the club's U-19 team), he made 35 appearances, scoring 7 goals and assisting 4 times.

He received his first ever call-up to the senior team ahead of a home Serie A game against Chievo Verona played on 18 March 2018; he, however, remained an unused substitute. In May, he was also among the substitutes for the team's last game of the season against Fiorentina but did not play.

=== Braga B ===
On 1 September 2018, Dias was sent out to LigaPro club Braga B on a season-long loan with option to buy.

=== Famalicão ===
On 28 August 2019, Dias joined Famalicão on a permanent deal. Dias was registered for the club's B-team.

=== Feirense ===
On 9 July 2021, he moved to Feirense.

=== Casa Pia ===
On 19 June 2023, Primeira Liga side Casa Pia announced the signing of Dias on a four-year contract.

=== Lusitânia ===
In June 2025, Dias joined recently-promoted Liga Portugal 2 club Lusitânia on a two-year contract.

== Style of play ==
Dias is a left-footed right winger, who can also play in a number 10 role. An agile, quick, and fast attacking player, he is known for his dribbling, ball control, and shooting from a long range.
