= Cuca (footballer, born 1991) =

Cape Verdean footballer

Personal information
- Full name: Carlos Miguel Pereira Fernandes
- Date of birth: 9 January 1991 (age 35)
- Place of birth: Lisbon, Portugal
- Height: 1.77 m (5 ft 10 in)
- Position: Defensive midfielder

Youth career
- 2004–2009: Oeiras

Senior career*
Years	Team	Apps	(Gls)
2009–2013	Oeiras	93	(2)
2013–2015	1º Dezembro	57	(1)
2015–2016	Omonia Aradippou	0	(0)
2016–2018	Felgueiras	63	(0)
2018–2021	Mafra	69	(0)
2021–2023	Casa Pia	31	(0)
2023–2024	União de Leiria	15	(1)
2024–2026	Belenenses	40	(1)

International career^{‡}
2021–	Cape Verde	6	(0)
- * Club domestic league appearances and goals as of 7 May 2026 ‡ National team caps and goals as of 26 August 2023

Carlos Miguel Pereira Fernandes (born 9 January 1991), better known as just Cuca, is a footballer who plays as a defensive midfielder. Born in Portugal, he plays for the Cape Verde national team.

== Professional career ==
A youth product of Oeiras, Cuca began his career with the club in 2009, and had stints thereafter with 1º Dezembro, Omonia Aradippou, and Felgueiras.

On 6 July 2018, he transferred to Mafra. Cuca made his professional debut with Mafra in a 4–1 Liga Portugal 2 win over Estoril on 23 September 2018.

On 18 June 2021, Cuca signed for Liga Portugal 2 side Casa Pia. On his first season, the club achieved promotion to the Primeira Liga for the first time in 83 years.

On 11 August 2023, Cuca returned to Liga Portugal 2, signing a one-year contract with recently promoted side União de Leiria.

== International career ==
Born in Portugal, Cuca is of Cape Verdean descent. He was called up to the Cape Verde national team for a pair of friendlies in June 2021. He debuted with the Cape Verde national team in a friendly 2–0 loss to Senegal on 8 June 2021.
