= Fahem Benaïssa-Yahia =

French footballer (born 2001)

Personal information
- Full name: Fahem Benssouna Ali Benaïssa-Yahia
- Date of birth: 29 April 2002 (age 24)
- Place of birth: Châlons-en-Champagne, France
- Height: 1.88 m (6 ft 2 in)
- Position: Left-back

Team information
- Current team: Mantova (on loan from Casa Pia)
- Number: 50

Youth career
- CO Châlons
- Reims

Senior career*
Years	Team	Apps	(Gls)
2020–2022	Reims II	25	(1)
2022–2023	Lyon-La Duchère	30	(2)
2023–2024	Villefranche	11	(1)
2024–	Casa Pia	19	(1)
2026–	→ Mantova (loan)	13	(1)
- * Club domestic league appearances and goals as of 13 May 2026

Fahem Benssouna Ali Benaïssa-Yahia (born 29 April 2002) is a professional footballer who plays as a left-back for Serie B club Mantova, on loan from Portuguese side Casa Pia, and the Algeria national team.

== Club career ==
A youth product of Reims, Benaïssa-Yahia began his senior career with their reserves in 2020. On 27 July 2022, he moved to Lyon-La Duchère for the 2022–23 season, where he made the team of the season. On 2 July 2023, he transferred to the Championnat National club Villefranche. On 26 January 2024, he transferred to Casa Pia on a contract to 2027. He made his senior and professional debut with Casa Pia as a substitute in a 4–0 Primeira Liga win over on 31 March 2024.

On 27 January 2026, Benaïssa-Yahia joined Mantova in Serie B on loan with an option to buy.

== International career ==
On November 9, 2026, Benaïssa-Yahia was called up to the Algeria national team for the first time.

== Personal life ==
Born in France, Benaïssa-Yahia is of Algerian descent.
