= Carlos Macedo =

Portuguese actor

Carlos Alberto Macedo (born 2 September 1965) is an actor.

== Career ==
He is a member of the professional Portuguese theater company KlássiKus. Macedo has appeared in a variety of media, from TV series, films, and animated movies to theatre productions. Most notably, he has lent his voice to many well-known animated characters in Portuguese translations of popular cartoons, including Diego Vega/Zorro in A Lenda de Zorro (The Legend of Zorro) and Kenshin Himura in Samurai X.

== Filmography ==
=== Animated television series ===
- Doug, as Doug
- Eu Sou o Weasel (I Am Weasel), as The Red Guy
- A Lenda de Zorro (The Legend of Zorro), as Diego Vega/Zorro
- Samurai X, as Rurouni Kenshin
- Tweenies - os amigos animais

=== Animated films ===
- Um porquinho chamado Babe (Babe)
- Toy Story – Os Rivais (Toy Story)
- Anastásia (Anastasia)
- Uma Vida de Insecto (A Bug's Life)
- Toy Story 2
- Shrek
- José, o Rei dos Sonhos (Joseph, King of the Dreams)
- A Floresta Mágica (The Magic Forest)
- A Dama e o Vagabundo (Lady and the Tramp)
- A Dama e o Vagabundo 2 (Lady and the Tramp II: Scamp's Adventure)
- 101 Dálmatas (One Hundred and One Dalmatians)
- 101 Dálmatas II (101 Dalmatians II: Patch's London Adventure)
- El Cid – A Lenda (The Legend of the Cid)
- Back to Gaya – Pequenos Heróis (Back to Gaya)
- Valiant – Os Bravos do Pombal (Valiant)
- O Franjinhas e o Carrossel Mágico (The Magic Roundabout)
- Bambi 2: o Grande Príncipe da Floresta (Bambi II)
