= Felippe Cardoso =

Brazilian footballer (born 1998)

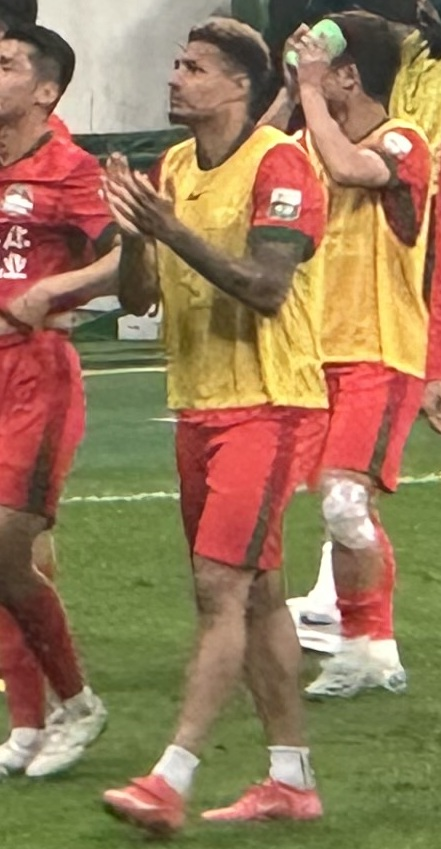
- Felippe Cardoso in April 2025

Personal information
- Full name: Wanderson Felippe Cardoso dos Santos
- Date of birth: 4 October 1998 (age 28)
- Place of birth: São Paulo, Brasil
- Height: 1.87 m (6 ft 2 in)
- Position: Forward

Team information
- Current team: Zhejiang FC
- Number: 27

Youth career
- 2016–2017: Osvaldo Cruz
- 2017: → Ponte Preta (loan)

Senior career*
Years	Team	Apps	(Gls)
2017–2018	Ponte Preta	16	(14)
2018–2022	Santos	10	(4)
2019–2020	→ Ceará (loan)	18	(23)
2020–2021	→ Fluminense (loan)	26	(22)
2021–2022	→ Vegalta Sendai (loan)	43	(34)
2023–2024	Casa Pia	40	(26)
2024–2026	Akhmat Grozny	12	(9)
2025	→ Henan FC (loan)	25	(26)
2026	Al-Najma	14	(12)
2026–	Zhejiang FC	8	(5)
- * Club domestic league appearances and goals as of 19 November 2026

Wanderson Felippe Cardoso dos Santos (born 4 October 1998), known as Felippe Cardoso or simply Felippe, is a Brazilian professional footballer who plays as a forward for Chinese Super League club Zhejiang FC.

== Club career ==
=== Osvaldo Cruz ===
Born in São Paulo, Felippe Cardoso joined Osvaldo Cruz's youth setup in 2016, and was promoted to the first-team ahead of the 2017 season. He made his senior debut on 8 April of that year, starting and scoring the opener in a 1–1 Campeonato Paulista Segunda Divisão home draw against Presidente Prudente.

On 17 June 2017, Felippe Cardoso scored a brace in a 2–1 away defeat of Grêmio Prudente.

=== Ponte Preta ===
On 13 September 2017, Felippe Cardoso joined Ponte Preta on loan, and was initially assigned to the under-20 squad. He impressed during the year's Copa RS, scoring three goals in five matches.

Promoted to the main squad by manager Eduardo Baptista, Felippe Cardoso made his debut for Ponte on 17 January 2018, starting and being sent off in a 1–0 away win against Corinthians. He scored his first goal for the club on 3 February, netting the opener in a 1–1 draw at Ituano.

On 17 February 2018, Felippe Cardoso signed a permanent four-year contract with the Macaca, with the club acquiring 60% of his federative rights.

=== Santos ===
On 4 September 2018, Felippe Cardoso joined Série A side Santos on loan until the end of the year. He made his debut for the club fourteen days later, replacing Derlis González in a 0–0 home draw against São Paulo.

On 8 October 2018, despite playing only one match since his arrival, Felippe Cardoso signed a permanent five-year contract with Peixe, after the club activated his buyout clause of R$ 3 million. He scored his first goal in the main category of Brazilian football on 24 November 2018, netting his team's second in a 3–2 home win against Atlético Mineiro.

On 5 July 2019, after losing space with new manager Jorge Sampaoli, Felippe Cardoso was loaned to fellow top tier side Ceará. The following 8 January, he moved to Fluminense on loan for the 2020 campaign.

On 1 April 2021, Felippe Cardoso moved abroad and agreed to a loan deal with Vegalta Sendai until the end of the year. On 29 December, his loan was extended for another season.

On 6 January 2023, Felippe Cardoso reached an agreement with Santos to terminate his contract, due to expire in September.

=== Akhmat Grozny ===
On 25 July 2024, Felipe Cardoso signed a four-year contract with Akhmat Grozny in Russian Premier League. On 30 January 2025, Cardoso was loaned to Henan FC until the end of 2025. On 12 January 2026, Henan FC announced his departure after the 2025 season.

=== Al-Najma ===
On 3 February 2026, Cardoso joined Saudi Pro League club Al-Najma.

=== Zhejiang FC ===
On 12 July 2026, Cardoso returned to China and joined Chinese Super League club Zhejiang FC.

== Career statistics ==
As of match played 6 December 2025

Appearances and goals by club, season and competition
Club	Season	League			State League		National Cup		League Cup		Continental		Other		Total	
Club	Season	Division	Apps	Goals	Apps	Goals	Apps	Goals	Apps	Goals	Apps	Goals	Apps	Goals	Apps	Goals
Osvaldo Cruz	2017	Paulista 2ª Divisão	—		15	7	—		—		—		—		15	7
Ponte Preta	2018	Série B	6	1	10	9	7	0	—		—		—		23	4
Santos	2018	Série A	4	1	—		—		—		—		—		4	1
Santos	2019	Série A	0	0	6	9	0	0	—		1 (Note: Appearance(s) in Copa Sudamericana)	0	—		7	0
Santos	Total		4	1	6	9	0	0	—		1	0	—		11	1
Ceará (loan)	2019	Série A	18	2	—		—		—		—		—		18	2
Fluminense (loan)	2020	Série A	20	2	6	1	1	0	—		0	0	—		27	3
Vegalta Sendai (loan)	2021	J1 League	23	1	—		1	0	0	0	—		—		24	1
Vegalta Sendai (loan)	2022	J2 League	20	3	—		0	0	—		—		—		20	3
Vegalta Sendai (loan)	Total		43	4	—		1	0	0	0	—		—		44	4
Casa Pia	2022–23	Primeira Liga	11	4	—		—		—		—		—		11	4
Casa Pia	2023–24	Primeira Liga	29	6	—		2	0	4	2	—		—		35	8
Casa Pia	Total		40	10	—		2	0	4	2	—		—		46	12
Akhmat Grozny	2024–25	Russian Premier League	12	2	—		5	0	—		—		—		17	2
Henan FC (loan)	2025	Chinese Super League	25	10	—		5	4	—		—		—		30	14
Career total			165	32	37	33	21	4	4	2	1	0	0	0	228	71

== Honours ==
Individual

- Primeira Liga Goal of the Month: March 2024,
