= Miguel Sousa =

Portuguese footballer

Personal information
- Full name: Miguel Ferreira de Sousa
- Date of birth: 19 September 1998 (age 28)
- Place of birth: Lisbon, Portugal
- Height: 1.76 m (5 ft 9 in)
- Position: Midfielder

Team information
- Current team: Leixões
- Number: 20

Youth career
- 2009–2014: Benfica
- 2014–2017: Cova da Piedade

Senior career*
Years	Team	Apps	(Gls)
2017–2018	Pinhalnovense	15	(0)
2018	Stumbras	0	(0)
2018–2022	Marítimo B	75	(8)
2021–2023	Marítimo	12	(0)
2023–2024	Mafra	42	(5)
2024–2026	Casa Pia	36	(0)
2026–	Leixões	12	(0)
- * Club domestic league appearances and goals as of 19 June 2026

Miguel Ferreira de Sousa (born 19 September 1998) is a Portuguese professional footballer who plays as a midfielder for Liga Portugal 2 club Leixões.

== Career ==
On 28 December 2021, Sousa made his Primeira Liga debut with Marítimo in a match against Vizela, coming on as a substitute in the 84th minute. Sousa made his first appearance in the starting line-up in a match against Gil Vicente on 20 March 2022.

On 5 January 2023, Sousa signed with Mafra until June 2024.

On 1 July 2024, after scoring 5 goals in 44 appearances for Mafra in Liga Portugal 2, Sousa joined Primeira Liga side Casa Pia.

On 1 February 2026, Sousa returned to Liga Portugal 2, joining the last-placed Leixões.
