= Kim Dong-jun (footballer) =

South Korean footballer (born 1994)

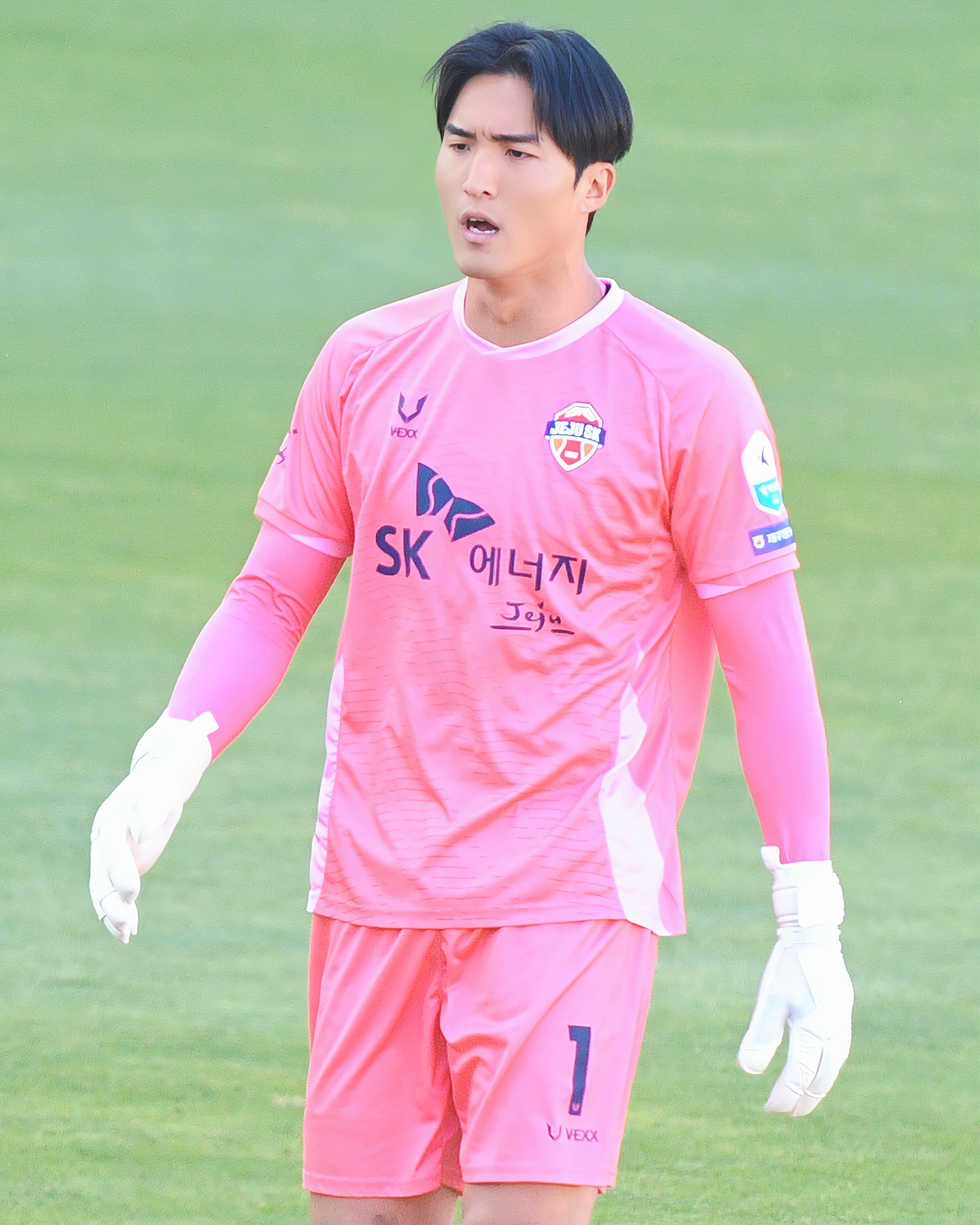
- Kim in 2026

Personal information
- Date of birth: 19 December 1994 (age 31)
- Place of birth: Suncheon, Jeonnam, South Korea
- Height: 1.90 m (6 ft 3 in)
- Position: Goalkeeper

Team information
- Current team: Jeju SK
- Number: 1

Youth career
- 2010–2012: Seongnam Ilhwa Chunma (Note: Played for Pungsaeng High School, which was an academy of Seongnam Ilhwa Chunma.)

College career
Years	Team	Apps	(Gls)
2013–2015	Yonsei University		

Senior career*
Years	Team	Apps	(Gls)
2016–2019	Seongnam FC	96	(0)
2020–2021	Daejeon Hana Citizen	32	(0)
2022–	Jeju SK	152	(0)

International career^{‡}
2013	South Korea U20	3	(0)
2014–2016	South Korea U23	20	(0)
2015	South Korea Universiade	5	(0)
2015–	South Korea	1	(0)
Medal record
Men's football
Representing South Korea
Summer Universiade
Silver medal – second place	2015 Gwangju
AFC U-23 Championship
Runner-up	2016 Qatar
EAFF Championship
Winner	2017 Japan
Runner-up	2022 Japan
- * Club domestic league appearances and goals as of 3 August 2026 ‡ National team caps and goals as of 20 July 2022

- Kim Dong-jun
- Hangul: 김동준
- Hanja: 金東俊
- RR: Gim Dongjun
- MR: Kim Tongjun

Kim Dong-jun (Korean: 김동준; Hanja: 金東俊, born 19 December 1994) is a South Korean footballer who plays as a goalkeeper for K League 1 club Jeju SK and the South Korea national team.

== International career ==
Kim represented South Korea at the 2015 Summer Universiade and the 2016 Summer Olympics before joining the senior national team. He won a silver medal at the Summer Universiade.

Kim was called up to the senior national team for the first time by manager Uli Stielike prior to 2018 FIFA World Cup qualifiers against Laos and Lebanon in September 2015. He made his senior international debut against China at the 2022 EAFF E-1 Football Championship. After keeping a clean sheet against China, he was selected as the tournament's best goalkeeper.

== Career statistics ==
As of match played 16 October 2024

Appearances and goals by club, season and competition
Club	Season	League			National Cup		Continental		Other		Total	
Club	Season	Division	Apps	Goals	Apps	Goals	Apps	Goals	Apps	Goals	Apps	Goals
Seongnam FC	2016	K League 1	26	0	1	0	—		1	0	28	0
Seongnam FC	2017	K League 2	35	0	3	0	—		1	0	39	0
Seongnam FC	2018	K League 2	6	0	0	0	—		—		6	0
Seongnam FC	2019	K League 1	28	0	0	0	—		—		28	0
Seongnam FC	Total		95	0	4	0	—		2	0	101	0
Daejeon Hana Citizen	2020	K League 2	5	0	1	0	—		—		6	0
Daejeon Hana Citizen	2021	K League 2	25	0	0	0	—		4	0	29	0
Daejeon Hana Citizen	Total		30	0	1	0	—		4	0	35	0
Jeju SK	2022	K League 1	32	0	2	0	—		—		34	0
Jeju SK	2023	K League 1	37	0	1	0	—		—		38	0
Jeju SK	2024	K League 1	31	0	3	0	—		—		34	0
Jeju SK	Total		100	0	6	0	—		—		106	0
Career total			225	0	11	0	0	0	6	0	242	0

== Honours ==
South Korea U23

- AFC U-23 Championship runner-up: 2016

South Korea Universiade

- Summer Universiade silver medal: 2015

South Korea

- EAFF Championship: 2017

Individual

- EAFF Championship Best Goalkeeper: 2022
