= Lucas Soares =

Brazilian footballer

Personal information
- Full name: Lucas Soares de Almeida
- Date of birth: 4 May 1998 (age 28)
- Place of birth: Goiânia, Brazil
- Height: 1.74 m (5 ft 9 in)
- Position: Right-back

Team information
- Current team: Santa Clara
- Number: 42

Youth career
- 2017–2018: Cruzeiro

Senior career*
Years	Team	Apps	(Gls)
2018–2023	Alverca	11	(1)
2019	→ Vitória SC (loan)	0	(0)
2019–2021	→ Vitória SC B (loan)	33	(12)
2021–2023	→ Casa Pia (loan)	56	(3)
2023–	Santa Clara	93	(0)
- * Club domestic league appearances and goals as of 20 September 2026

Lucas Soares de Almeida (born 4 May 1998) is a Brazilian professional footballer who plays as a right-back for Portuguese Primeira Liga club Santa Clara.

== Professional career ==
A youth product of the Brazilian club Cruzeiro, Soares moved to the Portuguese club Alverca for the 2018–19 season. On 6 July 2019, he was sent on loan to Vitória SC. Soares made his professional debut with Vitória in a 1–0 Taça da Liga win over C.D. Feirense on 5 August 2019. He spent the 2021–22 and 2022–23 seasons on loan with Casa Pia. In June 2023, Casa Pia chose not to trigger Soares' buy-option clause, with the right-back returning to Alverca.

On 6 July 2023, Soares signed a four-year contract with Liga Portugal 2 club Santa Clara.

== Career statistics ==
As of match played 20 September 2026

Appearances and goals by club, season and competition
Club	Season	League			National cup		League cup		Europe		Total	
Club	Season	Division	Apps	Goals	Apps	Goals	Apps	Goals	Apps	Goals	Apps	Goals
Alverca	2018–19	Campeonato de Portugal	11	1	—		—		—		11	1
Vitória SC (loan)	2019–20	Primeira Liga	0	0	0	0	1	0	1 (Note: Appearance in UEFA Europa League)	0	2	0
Vitória SC B (loan)	2019–20	Campeonato de Portugal	16	3	—		—		—		16	3
Vitória SC B (loan)	2020–21	Campeonato de Portugal	17	9	—		—		—		17	9
Vitória SC B (loan)	Total		33	12	—		—		—		33	12
Casa Pia (loan)	2021–22	Liga Portugal 2	29	2	2	0	2	0	—		33	2
Casa Pia (loan)	2022–23	Primeira Liga	27	1	2	0	3	0	—		32	1
Casa Pia (loan)	Total		56	3	4	0	5	0	—		65	3
Santa Clara	2023–24	Liga Portugal 2	32	0	3	0	0	0	—		35	0
Santa Clara	2024–25	Primeira Liga	30	0	3	0	1	0	—		34	0
Santa Clara	2025–26	Primeira Liga	27	0	2	1	1	0	3 (Note: Appearances in UEFA Conference League)	0	33	1
Santa Clara	2026–27	Primeira Liga	4	0	0	0	0	0	—		4	0
Santa Clara	Total		93	0	8	1	2	0	3	0	106	1
Career total			194	16	12	1	8	0	4	0	217	17
