= Clayton (footballer, born 1999) =

Brazilian footballer

Clayton Silva
Personal information
- Full name: Clayton Fernandes Silva
- Date of birth: 11 January 1999 (age 27)
- Place of birth: Belo Horizonte, Brazil
- Height: 1.84 m (6 ft 0 in)
- Position: Forward

Team information
- Current team: Olympiacos
- Number: 90

Youth career
- 2019: Lajeadense

Senior career*
| Years | Team | Apps | (Gls) |
| 2019 | Lajeadense | 2 | (0) |
| 2020 | Juventude | 3 | (0) |
| 2020 | Guarany de Sobral | 13 | (3) |
| 2021 | Globo | 16 | (10) |
| 2021–2022 | Vila Nova | 32 | (10) |
| 2022 | → Coritiba (loan) | 15 | (0) |
| 2022–2024 | Casa Pia | 53 | (12) |
| 2024–2025 | Vasco da Gama | 8 | (0) |
| 2024–2025 | → Rio Ave (loan) | 31 | (14) |
| 2025–2026 | Rio Ave | 19 | (10) |
| 2026– | Olympiacos | 6 | (0) |
- * Club domestic league appearances and goals as of 5 April 2026

Clayton Fernandes Silva (born 11 January 1999), simply known as Clayton Silva or Clayton, is a Brazilian footballer who plays as a forward for Super League Greece club Olympiacos.

== Club career ==
Born in Belo Horizonte, Minas Gerais, Clayton played amateur football before initially joining Serranense in January 2019. In March, however, after never signing a deal with the club, he moved to Lajeadense, and initially played for the under-20 side before making his first team debut later in the year.

On 19 December 2019, Clayton was presented at Juventude, after a partnership with Lajeadense was established. He appeared rarely before moving to Série D side Guarany de Sobral the following September, where he was a regular starter.

Ahead of the 2021 season, Clayton signed for Globo, and helped his side to win the Campeonato Potiguar by scoring ten goals. On 29 June of that year, he joined Vila Nova in the Série B.

Clayton featured regularly for Vila, and renewed his contract until 2024 on 18 February 2022. Just hours later, Série A side Coritiba announced his signing on a loan deal until December.

On 26 July 2022, Clayton moved abroad for the first time in his career, after signing a one-year loan deal with Primeira Liga newcomers Casa Pia.

On March 7, 2024, he was signed by Vasco da Gama to play in Série A, with the contract valid until December 2028. Clayton had few opportunities in the regular team and months later was loaned to Rio Ave in the Primeira Liga.

After impressing on loan, scoring 18 goals in 37 matches for the Vila do Conde-based side, Clayton joined the club on a permanent deal, signing a contract until the summer of 2029 for a reported transfer fee of €3 million.

Later, Clayton joined Olympiacos.

== Career statistics ==
As of match played 8 November 2025

| Club | Season | League | | | State league | | National cup (Note: Includes Copa do Brasil, Taça de Portugal) | | League cup (Note: Includes Taça da Liga) | | Other | | Total | |
| Club | Season | Division | Apps | Goals | Apps | Goals | Apps | Goals | Apps | Goals | Apps | Goals | Apps | Goals |
|---|---|---|---|---|---|---|---|---|---|---|---|---|---|---|
| Lajeadense | 2019 | — | | | 2 (Note: Appearances in Campeonato Gaúcho Série A2) | 0 | — | | — | | 4 (Note: Appearances in Copa FGF) | 0 | 6 | 0 |
| Juventude | 2020 | Série B | 0 | 0 | 3 (Note: Appearances in Campeonato Gaúcho) | 0 | 0 | 0 | — | | — | | 3 | 0 |
| Guarany de Sobral | 2020 | Série D | 13 | 3 | 0 | 0 | — | | — | | — | | 13 | 3 |
| Globo | 2021 | — | | | 16 (Note: Appearances in Campeonato Potiguar) | 10 | — | | — | | — | | 16 | 10 |
| Vila Nova | 2021 | Série B | 25 | 7 | 0 | 0 | 0 | 0 | — | | 4 (Note: Appearances in Copa Verde) | 0 | 29 | 7 |
| Vila Nova | 2022 | Série B | 0 | 0 | 7 (Note: Appearances in Campeonato Goiano) | 3 | 0 | 0 | — | | 0 | 0 | 7 | 3 |
| Vila Nova | Total | | 25 | 7 | 7 | 3 | 0 | 0 | — | | 4 | 0 | 36 | 10 |
| Coritiba (loan) | 2022 | Série A | 9 | 0 | 6 (Note: Appearances in Campeonato Paranaense) | 0 | 4 | 2 | — | | — | | 19 | 2 |
| Casa Pia | 2022–23 | Primeira Liga | 29 | 4 | — | | 2 | 0 | 3 | 0 | — | | 34 | 4 |
| Casa Pia | 2023–24 | Primeira Liga | 24 | 8 | — | | 2 | 0 | 4 | 4 | — | | 30 | 12 |
| Casa Pia | Total | | 53 | 12 | — | | 4 | 0 | 7 | 4 | — | | 64 | 16 |
| Vasco da Gama | 2024 | Série A | 6 | 0 | 2 (Note: Appearances in Campeonato Carioca) | 0 | 0 | 0 | — | | — | | 8 | 0 |
| Rio Ave (loan) | 2024–25 | Primeira Liga | 31 | 14 | — | | 6 | 4 | — | | — | | 37 | 18 |
| Rio Ave | 2025–26 | Primeira Liga | 11 | 7 | — | | 0 | 0 | — | | — | | 11 | 7 |
| Career total | | | 148 | 43 | 36 | 13 | 14 | 6 | 7 | 4 | 8 | 0 | 213 | 66 |

== Honours ==
Globo

- Campeonato Potiguar: 2021

Individual

- Primeira Liga Forward of the Month: January 2025, August 2025,
