= Saviour Godwin =

Nigerian footballer

Personal information
- Full name: Saviour Amunde Godwin
- Date of birth: 22 August 1996 (age 30)
- Place of birth: Jos, Nigeria
- Height: 1.73 m (5 ft 8 in)
- Position: Winger

Team information
- Current team: Baniyas
- Number: 77

Youth career
- FC Sports Jos

Senior career*
Years	Team	Apps	(Gls)
2015–2016	KV Oostende	6	(1)
2016–2020	Roeselare	84	(14)
2020–2023	Casa Pia	90	(22)
2023–2025	Al-Okhdood	58	(13)
2025–	Baniyas	0	(0)

International career^{‡}
2013	Nigeria U17	6	(0)
2015	Nigeria U20	4	(2)
2022–	Nigeria	1	(0)
- * Club domestic league appearances and goals as of 22 May 2025 ‡ National team caps and goals as of 27 September 2022

Saviour Amunde Godwin (born 22 August 1996) is a Nigerian professional footballer who plays as a winger for UAE club Baniyas.

== Career ==
On 7 September 2023, Godwin joined Saudi Pro League club Al-Okhdood, for a reported fee of €2.5 million.

On 6 July 2025, Godwin joined UAE Pro League club Baniyas.

== International career ==
He was selected by Nigeria for their 35-man provisional squad for the 2016 Summer Olympics.

Godwin made his debut for the Nigeria national football team on 27 September 2022 in a friendly game against Algeria.

== Honours ==
Nigeria U17

- FIFA U-17 World Cup: 2013

Individual

- Liga Portugal 2 Team of the Season: 2021–22
- Liga Portugal 2 Forward of the Month: August 2021
