= Yūki Sōma =

Japanese footballer

Yūki Sōma 相馬 勇紀
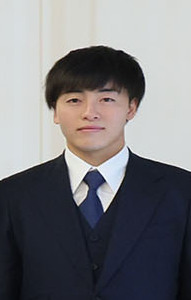
- Sōma in 2022

Personal information
- Full name: Yūki Sōma
- Date of birth: 25 February 1997 (age 29)
- Place of birth: Chōfu, Tokyo, Japan
- Height: 1.66 m (5 ft 5 in)
- Position: Winger

Team information
- Current team: Machida Zelvia
- Number: 7

Youth career
- Fuda SC
- –2014: Mitsubishi Yowa

College career
Years	Team	Apps	(Gls)
2015–2018	Waseda University		

Senior career*
Years	Team	Apps	(Gls)
2018–2024	Nagoya Grampus	123	(8)
2019	→ Kashima Antlers (loan)	5	(1)
2022–2024	→ Casa Pia (loan)	56	(7)
2024–	Machida Zelvia	58	(15)

International career^{‡}
2019–2021	Japan U23	17	(3)
2019–	Japan	22	(5)
Medal record
Men's football
Representing Japan
EAFF Championship
Winner	2022 Japan	Team
Winner	2025 Japan	Team
- * Club domestic league appearances and goals as of 9 August 2026 ‡ National team caps and goals as of 1 October 2026

Yūki Sōma (相馬 勇紀, Sōma Yūki; born 25 February 1997) is a Japanese professional footballer who plays as a winger for J1 League club Machida Zelvia, and the Japan national team.

== Career ==
On 10 December 2019, Sōma made his international debut in a 2–1 win against China in the 2019 EAFF E-1 Football Championship. On 22 July 2022, Sōma scored his first 2 international goals in a 6–0 win over Hong Kong in the 2022 EAFF E-1 Football Championship.

On 1 November 2022, Sōma was included in Japan's 26-man squad for the 2022 FIFA World Cup in Qatar.

On 11 July 2024, Sōma officially returned to Nagoya Grampus.

On 22 November 2025, he scored the second goal to help Machida Zelvia lead 2-0 in an ultimately 3–1 victory against Vissel Kobe in the final of the 2025 Emperor's Cup.

== Style of play ==
Sōma is an attack-minded wide player known for his explosive acceleration, dribbling ability and effectiveness in one-on-one situations. He primarily operates as a winger or wing-back and is capable of playing on either flank. He has identified speed-based dribbling and individual duels as among his main strengths, while his ability to use his pace and acceleration to beat defenders was developed during his time in the Mitsubishi Yowa youth system.

A direct and aggressive attacker, Sōma frequently attempts to beat his marker through changes of pace and dribbling rather than relying solely on passing combinations. On the left flank, he is comfortable cutting inside as well as driving towards the byline, while on the right he can deliver crosses and use his positioning to create opportunities to cut inside. His versatility on both sides allows him to adapt to different attacking systems. During Japan's 2019 EAFF E-1 Football Championship match against Hong Kong, he attempted seven dribbles and completed all seven, while also recording 14 crosses. Although only two of those crosses were directly successful, his wide play generated considerable attacking momentum and created opportunities for his teammates.

In addition to his attacking qualities, Sōma has experience playing as a full-back and wing-back. He has demonstrated an understanding of defensive one-on-one situations and has explained how his experience defending against opponents' forward runs influenced his own approach to attacking play. His willingness to repeatedly challenge defenders and make forward runs makes him particularly effective when given space to exploit on the flanks.

== Personal life ==
Sōma was born in Tokyo, Japan, on 25 February 1997. He began playing football at the age of six after being invited by a friend. His parents were both involved in tennis: his father played the sport, while his mother won championships at both the Inter-High School Championships and the National Sports Festival. Sōma has described himself as highly competitive when playing football but generally mild-mannered in his everyday life.

In FC Machida Zelvia's 2026 player profile, Sōma listed childcare as one of his current interests and identified the birth of his son as a recent personal highlight.

== Career statistics ==
=== Club ===
As of match played 4 October 2025.

Appearances and goals by club, season and competition
Club	Season	League			National Cup		League Cup		Continental		Other		Total	
Club	Season	Division	Apps	Goals	Apps	Goals	Apps	Goals	Apps	Goals	Apps	Goals	Apps	Goals
Nagoya Grampus	2018	J1 League	9	1	0	0	0	0	—		—		9	1
Nagoya Grampus	2019	J1 League	16	1	1	0	7	3	—		—		24	4
Nagoya Grampus	2020	J1 League	31	2	—		4	1	—		—		35	3
Nagoya Grampus	2021	J1 League	33	2	2	0	4	0	8 (Note: Appearances at the AFC Champions League)	0	—		47	2
Nagoya Grampus	2022	J1 League	34	2	1	0	10	1	—		—		45	3
Nagoya Grampus	Total		123	8	4	0	25	5	8	0	0	0	16	13
Kashima Antlers (loan)	2019	J1 League	5	1	0	0	0	0	1	0	—		6	1
Kashima Antlers (loan)	Total		5	1	0	0	0	0	1	0	—		6	1
Casa Pia (loan)	2022–23	Primeira Liga	11	2	—		1	0	—		—		12	2
Casa Pia (loan)	2023–24	Primeira Liga	30	5	2	0	3	0	—		—		35	5
Casa Pia (loan)	Total		41	7	2	0	3	0	1	0	—		47	7
Machida Zelvia	2024	J1 League	10	1	0	0	0	0	—		—		10	1
Machida Zelvia	2024	J1 League	29	9	2	1	0	0	—		—		31	10
Machida Zelvia	Total		39	10	2	1	0	0	0	0	—		41	11
Career total			198	26	8	1	29	5	9	0	0	0	254	32

=== International ===
As of match played 1 October 2026

National team	Year	Apps	Goals
Japan	2019	3	0
Japan	2020	0	0
Japan	2021	0	0
Japan	2022	6	4
Japan	2023	3	0
Japan	2024	2	1
Japan	2025	5	0
Japan	2026	3	0
Total		22	5

International goals

Scores and results list Japan's goal tally first.

No	Date	Venue	Opponent	Score	Result	Competition
1.	19 July 2022	Kashima Soccer Stadium, Ibaraki, Japan	Hong Kong	1–0	6–0	2022 EAFF E-1 Football Championship
2.	19 July 2022	Kashima Soccer Stadium, Ibaraki, Japan	Hong Kong	5–0	6–0	2022 EAFF E-1 Football Championship
3.	27 July 2022	Toyota Stadium, Toyota, Japan	South Korea	1–0	3–0	2022 EAFF E-1 Football Championship
4.	17 November 2022	Al-Maktoum Stadium, Dubai, United Arab Emirates	Canada	1–0	1–2	Friendly
5.	11 June 2024	Edion Peace Wing Hiroshima, Hiroshima, Japan	Syria	4–0	5–0	2026 FIFA World Cup qualification

== Honours ==
Nagoya Grampus

- J.League Cup: 2021

Machida Zelvia

- Emperor's Cup: 2025

Japan

- EAFF Championship: 2022, 2025

Individual

- Toulon Tournament Best XI: 2019
- EAFF Championship Top goalscorer: 2022
- EAFF Championship Most Valuable Player: 2022
- J.League Best XI: 2025
