= Estádio Municipal de Rio Maior =

Stadium in Rio Maior, Portugal

Coordinates: 39°20′40″N 8°56′07″W

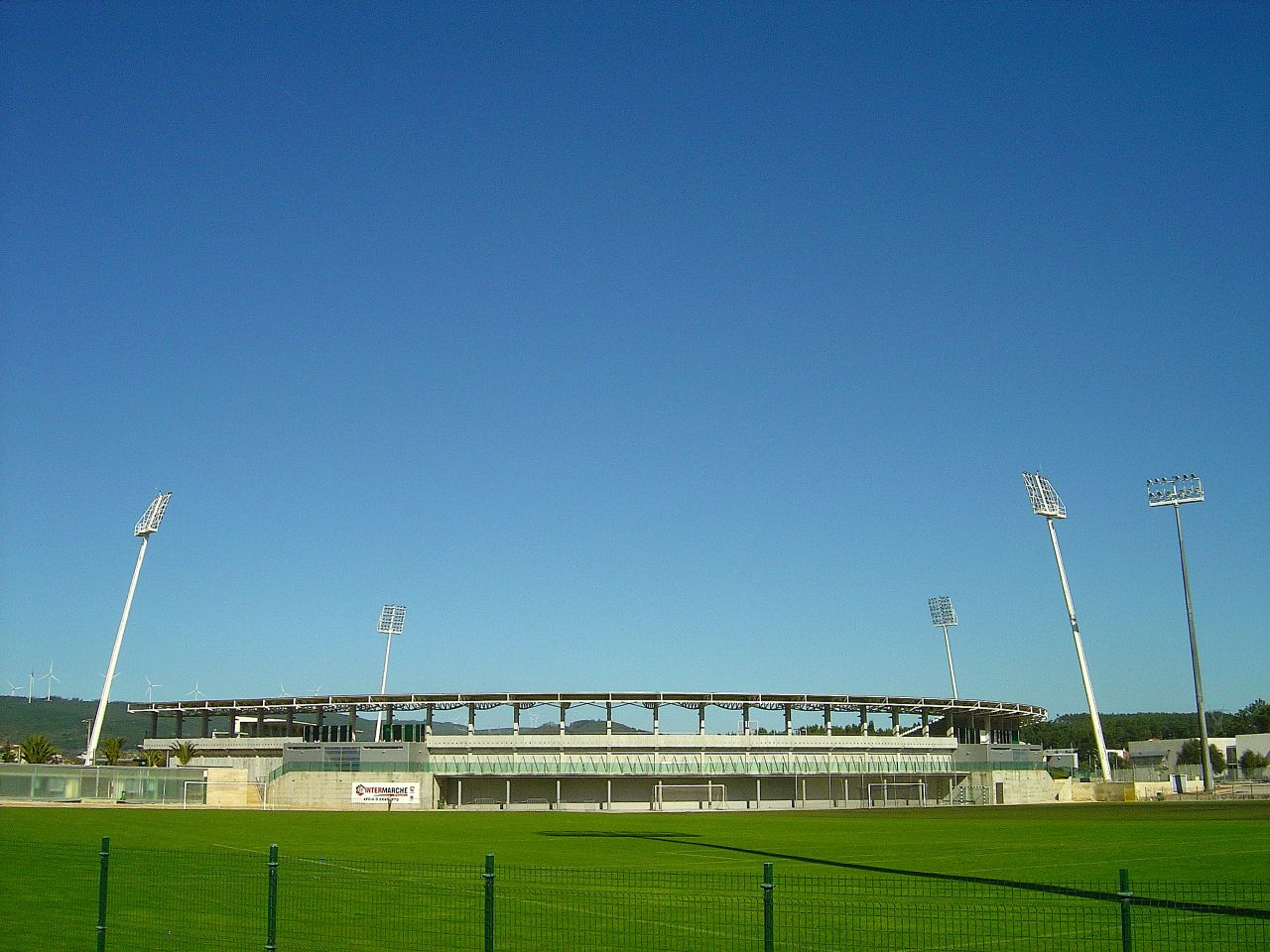
- Interactive map of Estádio Municipal de Rio Maior
- Location: Rio Maior, Portugal
- Owner: Desmor, EM, SA
- Capacity: 7,000
- Surface: Grass
- Record attendance: 7,051 (25 January 2025) Casa Pia A.C. 3 x 1 S.L. Benfica
- Field size: 104 x 68 metres

Construction
- Built: 2002
- Opened: 2003
- Architect: Antonio Domingues

Tenants
- U.D. Rio Maior; U.D. Vilafranquense (2019–2023); Sporting B (2012–2013); Portugal U21 (regularly); Casa Pia (2023–)

The Estádio Municipal de Rio Maior is a multi-use stadium in Rio Maior, Portugal.It is currently used mainly for football matches and is the home of Rio Maior Sport Clube, the municipality's new football club and successor to UD Rio Maior. The stadium has a capacity for 7,000 people and opened in 2003.

The Rio Maior Sports Complex, in addition to the municipal stadium, contains several training football pitches, which the Portuguese youth teams use. It also has an Olympic swimming pool and pavilions for indoor sports. In fact, in 2024, it hosted 7 training camp games for the Portugal national futsal team.

== Resident teams ==
It has been the venue of Casa Pia AC since 2023/24 in its second season in the Primeira Liga. This is due to the fact that the club does not have adequate infrastructure for the football spectacle.

UD Vilafranquense hosted games at this stadium in their debut season in the Segunda Liga in 2019/20, due to inadequate facilities at their own ground.

In 2012/13, it was home to Sporting CP B in its first season, before moving to Alcochete.
